= 1982 NBL Finals =

- League: National Basketball League
- Sport: Basketball
- Duration: 16–18 July
- Teams: 4
- TV partner: ABC

Grand Final
- Champions: West Adelaide Bearcats
- Runners-up: Geelong Cats
- Finals MVP: Not awarded

Seasons
- ← 1981 1983 →

The 1982 NBL Finals was the postseason tournament of the National Basketball League's 1982 season, which began in February. The finals began on 16 July. The tournament concluded with the West Adelaide Bearcats defeating the Geelong Cats in the NBL Grand Final on 18 July.

== Format ==
The NBL finals series in 1982 consisted of two semi-final games, and one championship-deciding grand final. The finals were contested between the top four teams of the regular season, with the finals weekend hosted at the neutral Newcastle Sports Entertainment Centre in Newcastle, New South Wales.

== Qualification ==
=== Qualified teams ===
Team	Finals appearance	Previous appearance	Previous best performance
West Adelaide Bearcats	3rd	1981	Runner-up (1980)
Geelong Cats	1st	N/A	N/A
Nunawading Spectres	3rd	1981	Runner-up (1981)
Coburg Giants	1st	N/A	N/A

=== Ladder ===
Pos	1982 NBL season											
Pos	Team	Pld	W	L	PCT	Last 5	Streak	Home	Away	PF	PA	PP
1	West Adelaide Bearcats	26	21	5	80.77%	4–1	W2	12–1	9–4	2525	2177	115.99%
2	Geelong Cats	26	20	6	76.92%	3–2	L2	11–2	9–4	2310	2183	105.82%
3	Nunawading Spectres	26	19	7	73.08%	3–2	W1	13–0	6–7	2209	1993	110.84%
4	Coburg Giants	26	18	8	69.23%	3–2	W3	11–2	7–6	2260	2067	109.34%
5	Newcastle Falcons^{1}	26	17	9	65.38%	5–0	W5	11–2	6–7	2395	2258	106.07%
6	St. Kilda Saints^{1}	26	17	9	65.38%	4–1	W4	10–3	7–6	2185	2090	104.55%
7	Adelaide City Eagles	26	15	11	57.69%	1–4	W1	10–3	5–8	2457	2356	104.29%
8	Brisbane Bullets	26	12	14	46.15%	2–3	W1	7–6	5–8	2059	2119	97.17%
9	Illawarra Hawks	26	11	15	42.31%	1–4	L2	8–5	3–10	2382	2444	97.46%
10	Westate Wildcats	26	10	16	38.46%	1–4	L1	7–6	3–10	2260	2431	92.97%
11	Canberra Cannons	26	8	18	30.77%	2–3	W1	7–6	1–12	2132	2221	95.99%
12	Sydney Supersonics	26	7	19	26.92%	0–5	L6	5–8	2–11	2022	2232	90.59%
13	Launceston Casino City	26	5	21	19.23%	3–2	L1	4–9	1–12	2231	2483	89.85%
14	Bankstown Bruins	26	2	24	07.69%	1–4	L2	2–11	0–13	1948	2321	83.93%

Updated to match(es) played on 11 July 1982. Source: NBL.com.au

The NBL tie-breaker system as outlined in the NBL Rules and Regulations states that in the case of an identical win–loss record, the results in games played between the teams will determine order of seeding.

== Playoff bracket ==
Semifinals
1	West Adelaide Bearcats	94
4	Coburg Giants	74
2	Geelong Cats	71
3	Nunawading Spectres	59

Grand Final
1	West Adelaide Bearcats	80
2	Geelong Cats	74

== Semifinals ==
=== (2) Geelong Cats vs (3) Nunawading Spectres ===
ABC

16 July

boxscore

Geelong Cats 71, Nunawading Spectres 59
Pts: James Crawford 29; Rebs: James Crawford 13; Asts: Multiple 3	Pts: Chuck Harmison 16; Rebs: Chuck Harmison 11; Asts: Multiple 3

Newcastle Sports Entertainment Centre
Referees: John Holden, Ray Hunt

=== (1) West Adelaide Bearcats vs (4) Coburg Giants ===
ABC

16 July

boxscore

West Adelaide Bearcats 94, Coburg Giants 74
Pts: Ken Richardson 25; Rebs: Tied 13; Asts: Ken Richardson 4	Pts: Benny Lewis 25; Rebs: Ray Borner 7 Asts: Multiple 1

Newcastle Sport2 Entertainment Centre
Referees: Eddie Crouch, Trevor Dallas

== Grand Final ==
=== (1) West Adelaide Bearcats vs (2) Geelong Cats ===
ABC
Highlights

18 July

boxscore

West Adelaide Bearcats 80, Geelong Cats 74
Pts: Leroy Loggins 32; Rebs: Ken Richardson 11; Asts: Ray Wood 4	Pts: James Crawford 21; Rebs: Craig Herbert 7 Asts: Cal Bruton 3
West Adelaide wins the NBL Championship

Newcastle Sports Entertainment Centre
Referees: Eddie Crouch, John Holden

== See also ==
- 1982 NBL season
