= 1981 NBL Finals =

- League: National Basketball League
- Sport: Basketball
- Duration: 27–28 June
- Teams: 4
- TV partner: ABC

Grand Final
- Champions: Launceston Casino City
- Runners-up: Nunawading Spectres
- Finals MVP: Not awarded

Seasons
- ← 1980 1982 →

The 1981 NBL Finals was the postseason tournament of the National Basketball League's 1981 season, which began in February. The finals began on 27 June. The tournament concluded with the Launceston Casino City defeating the Nunawading Spectres in the NBL Grand Final on 28 June.

== Format ==
The NBL finals series in 1981 consisted of two semifinal games, and one championship-deciding grand final. The finals were contested between the top four teams of the regular season, with the finals weekend hosted at the neutral Apollo Entertainment Centre in Adelaide.

== Qualification ==
=== Qualified teams ===
Team	Finals appearance	Previous appearance	Previous best performance
Launceston Casino City	1st	-	-
West Adelaide Bearcats	2nd	1980	Runner-up (1980)
Nunawading Spectres	2nd	1980	Semi-finalist (1980)
Brisbane Bullets	2nd	1980	Semi-finalist (1980)

=== Ladder ===
Pos	1981 NBL season											
Pos	Team	Pld	W	L	PCT	Last 5	Streak	Home	Away	PF	PA	PP
1	St. Kilda Saints^{1}	22	17	5	77.27%	5–0	W6	10–1	7–4	2134	1927	110.74%
2	Launceston Casino City	22	14	8	63.64%	4–1	W3	7–4	7–4	1895	1810	104.70%
3	West Adelaide Bearcats^{2}	22	13	9	59.09%	3–2	W1	10–1	3–8	1848	1823	101.37%
4	Nunawading Spectres^{2}	22	13	9	59.09%	3–2	L1	8–3	5–6	1706	1566	108.94%
5	Brisbane Bullets^{1 2 3}	22	13	9	59.09%	3–2	W1	6–5	7–4	1712	1592	107.54%
6	Newcastle Falcons^{2 3}	22	13	9	59.09%	0–5	L6	9–2	4–7	1779	1714	103.79%
7	Canberra Cannons	22	12	10	54.55%	3–2	W3	10–1	2–9	1700	1719	98.89%
8	Illawarra Hawks	22	9	13	40.91%	3–2	L1	8–3	1–10	1889	1949	96.92%
9	City of Sydney Astronauts	22	8	14	36.36%	4–1	W2	5–6	3–8	1711	1898	90.15%
10	Coburg Giants^{4}	22	7	15	31.82%	0–5	L5	6–5	1–10	1690	1746	96.79%
11	Bankstown Bruins^{4}	22	7	15	31.82%	1–4	L1	5–6	2–9	1746	1897	92.04%
12	Forestville Eagles	22	6	16	27.27%	1–4	L3	5–6	1–10	1719	1888	91.05%

Updated to match(es) played on 21 June 1981. Source: NBL.com.au

The NBL tie-breaker system as outlined in the NBL Rules and Regulations states that in the case of an identical win–loss record, the results in games played between the teams will determine order of seeding.

^{1}St. Kilda Saints chose to participate in the 1981 FIBA Club World Cup in Brazil, instead of the 1981 NBL Finals. They were replaced by the Brisbane Bullets.

^{2}4-way Head-to-Head between West Adelaide Bearcats (5-1), Nunawading Spectres (3-3), Brisbane Bullets (2-4) and Newcastle Falcons (2-4).

^{3}Head-to-Head between Brisbane Bullets and Newcastle Falcons (1-1). Brisbane Bullets won For and Against (+15).

^{4}Head-to-Head between Coburg Giants and Bankstown Bruins (1-1). Coburg Giants won For and Against (+24).

== Playoff bracket ==
Semifinals
1	Launceston Casino City	71
4	Brisbane Bullets	69
2	West Adelaide Bearcats	71
3	Nunawading Spectres	74

Grand Final
1	Launceston Casino City	75
2	Nunawading Spectres	54

== Semifinals ==
Date	Home	Score	Away	Box Score		
27 June 1981	Launceston Casino City	71–69	Brisbane Bullets	{{{venue}}}	{{{crowd}}}	boxscore
27 June 1981	West Adelaide Bearcats	71–74	Nunawading Spectres	{{{venue}}}	{{{crowd}}}	boxscore

== Grand Final ==
Date	Home	Score	Away	Box Score		
28 June 1981	Launceston Casino City	75–54	Nunawading Spectres	{{{venue}}}	{{{crowd}}}	boxscore

== See also ==
- 1981 NBL season
