= 1980 NBL Finals =

- League: National Basketball League
- Sport: Basketball
- Duration: 14–15 June
- Teams: 4
- TV partner: ABC

Grand Final
- Champions: St Kilda Saints
- Runners-up: West Adelaide Bearcats
- Grand Final MVP: Rocky Smith

Seasons
- ← 1979 1981 →

The 1980 NBL Finals was the postseason tournament of the National Basketball League's 1980 season, which began in February. The finals began on 14 June. The tournament concluded with the minor premiers St Kilda Saints defeating the second-seeded West Adelaide Bearcats in the NBL Grand Final on 15 June. Rocky Smith was named NBL Grand Final MVP.

== Format ==
The NBL finals series in 1980 consisted of two semifinal games, and one championship-deciding grand final. The finals were contested between the top four teams of the regular season, with the finals weekend hosted at the neutral Dowling Street Stadium in Launceston, Tasmania.

== Qualification ==
Team	Finals appearance	Previous appearance	Previous best performance
St Kilda Saints	2nd	1979	Champions (1979)
West Adelaide Bearcats	1st	-	-
Brisbane Bullets	1st	-	-
Nunawading Spectres	1st	-	-

== Ladder ==
Pos	1980 NBL season											
Pos	Team	Pld	W	L	PCT	Last 5	Streak	Home	Away	PF	PA	PP
1	St. Kilda Saints^{1}	22	17	5	77.27%	4–1	L1	9–2	8–3	2109	1886	111.82%
2	West Adelaide Bearcats^{1}	22	17	5	77.27%	4–1	W3	10–1	7–4	1941	1773	109.48%
3	Brisbane Bullets	22	15	7	68.18%	5–0	W5	9–2	6–5	1928	1780	108.31%
4	Nunawading Spectres	22	14	8	63.64%	2–3	W2	8–3	6–5	1660	1580	105.06%
5	Illawarra Hawks^{2}	22	13	9	59.09%	2–3	L3	5–6	8–3	1798	1790	100.45%
6	Newcastle Falcons^{2}	22	13	9	59.09%	5–0	W5	6–5	7–4	1828	1794	101.90%
7	Canberra Cannons	22	11	11	50.00%	0–5	L5	8–3	3–8	1661	1631	101.84%
8	Launceston Casino City	22	9	13	40.91%	3–2	W1	6–5	3–8	1863	1889	98.62%
9	Coburg Giants^{3}	22	7	15	31.82%	1-4	L2	5–6	2–9	1727	1740	99.25%
10	City of Sydney Astronauts^{3}	22	7	15	31.82%	1–4	W1	5–6	2–9	1717	1908	89.99%
11	West Torrens Eagles	22	6	16	27.27%	1–4	L2	6–5	0–11	1707	1940	87.99%
12	Bankstown Bruins	22	3	19	13.64%	0–5	L13	2–9	1–10	1721	1949	88.30%

Updated to match(es) played on 8 June 1980. Source: NBL.com.au

== Playoff bracket ==
Semifinals
1	St. Kilda Saints	101
4	Nunawading Spectres	77
2	West Adelaide Bearcats	101
3	Brisbane Bullets	94

Grand Final
1	St. Kilda Saints	113
2	West Adelaide Bearcats	88

== Semifinals ==
Date	Home	Score	Away	Box Score		
14/06/1980	St. Kilda Saints	101–77	Nunawading Spectres	{{{venue}}}	{{{crowd}}}	boxscore
14/06/1980	West Adelaide Bearcats	101–94	Brisbane Bullets	{{{venue}}}	{{{crowd}}}	boxscore

== Grand Final ==
Date	Home	Score	Away	Box Score		
15/06/1980	St. Kilda Saints	113–88	West Adelaide Bearcats	{{{venue}}}	{{{crowd}}}	boxscore

== See also ==
- 1980 NBL season
