= 1981 NBL season =

- League: National Basketball League
- Sport: Basketball
- Duration: 14 February – 21 June 1981 (Regular season); 27–28 June 1981 (Finals)
- Games: 22
- Teams: 12
- TV partner: ABC

Regular season
- Season champions: St. Kilda Saints
- Season MVP: Mike Jones (Illawarra)
- Top scorer: Mike Jones (Illawarra)

Finals
- Champions: Launceston Casino City (1st title)
- Runners-up: Nunawading Spectres

NBL seasons
- ← 1980 1982 →

The 1981 NBL season was the third season of the National Basketball League (NBL).

== Regular season ==
The regular season took place over 18 rounds between 14 February 1981 and 21 June 1981. Each team played 22 games, against every opponent twice.

=== Round 1 ===
Date	Home	Score	Away	Venue	Crowd	Box Score
14/02/1981	Forestville Eagles	94–74	West Adelaide Bearcats	Apollo Entertainment Centre	N/A	boxscore
21/02/1981	Newcastle Falcons	93–73	Illawarra Hawks	Newcastle Sports Entertainment Centre	N/A	boxscore
21/02/1981	Forestville Eagles	77–78	Bankstown Bruins	Apollo Entertainment Centre	N/A	boxscore
21/02/1981	Canberra Cannons	78–71	Nunawading Spectres	AIS Arena	N/A	boxscore
21/02/1981	Launceston Casino City	90–88	St. Kilda Saints	Dowling Street Stadium	N/A	boxscore
22/02/1981	City of Sydney Astronauts	80–92	Illawarra Hawks	Alexandria Stadium	N/A	boxscore
22/02/1981	West Adelaide Bearcats	91–74	Bankstown Bruins	Apollo Entertainment Centre	N/A	boxscore
22/02/1981	Brisbane Bullets	56–60	Nunawading Spectres	Auchenflower Stadium	N/A	boxscore
22/02/1981	Coburg Giants	88–93	St. Kilda Saints	Ken Watson Stadium	N/A	boxscore

=== Round 2 ===
Date	Home	Score	Away	Venue	Crowd	Box Score
28/02/1981	Illawarra Hawks	91–71	Canberra Cannons	Beaton Park Stadium	N/A	boxscore
28/02/1981	Launceston Casino City	79–85	Brisbane Bullets	Dowling Street Stadium	N/A	boxscore
28/02/1981	Nunawading Spectres	83–62	City of Sydney Astronauts	Burwood Stadium	N/A	boxscore
28/02/1981	West Adelaide Bearcats	85–73	Newcastle Falcons	Apollo Entertainment Centre	N/A	boxscore
1/03/1981	Bankstown Bruins	64–66	Canberra Cannons	Bankstown Basketball Stadium	N/A	boxscore
1/03/1981	Coburg Giants	61–78	Brisbane Bullets	Ken Watson Stadium	N/A	boxscore
1/03/1981	St. Kilda Saints	104–72	City of Sydney Astronauts	Albert Park Basketball Stadium	N/A	boxscore
1/03/1981	Forestville Eagles	54–74	Newcastle Falcons	Apollo Entertainment Centre	N/A	boxscore

=== Round 3 ===
Date	Home	Score	Away	Venue	Crowd	Box Score
7/03/1981	St. Kilda Saints	114–100	Illawarra Hawks	Albert Park Basketball Stadium	N/A	boxscore
7/03/1981	Newcastle Falcons	73–50	Canberra Cannons	Newcastle Sports Entertainment Centre	N/A	boxscore
7/03/1981	Forestville Eagles	66–59	Coburg Giants	Apollo Entertainment Centre	N/A	boxscore
8/03/1981	Nunawading Spectres	95–74	Illawarra Hawks	Kilsyth Stadium	N/A	boxscore
8/03/1981	City of Sydney Astronauts	69–74	Canberra Cannons	Alexandria Stadium	N/A	boxscore
8/03/1981	West Adelaide Bearcats	82–74	Coburg Giants	Apollo Entertainment Centre	N/A	boxscore

=== Round 4 ===
Date	Home	Score	Away	Venue	Crowd	Box Score
14/03/1981	Bankstown Bruins	77–88	Launceston Casino City	Bankstown Basketball Stadium	N/A	boxscore
14/03/1981	Canberra Cannons	82–71	Forestville Eagles	AIS Arena	N/A	boxscore
14/03/1981	Newcastle Falcons	80–75	Coburg Giants	Newcastle Sports Entertainment Centre	N/A	boxscore
14/03/1981	St. Kilda Saints	94–90	West Adelaide Bearcats	Albert Park Basketball Stadium	N/A	boxscore
15/03/1981	Illawarra Hawks	91–104	Launceston Casino City	Beaton Park Stadium	N/A	boxscore
15/03/1981	Brisbane Bullets	84–71	Forestville Eagles	Auchenflower Stadium	N/A	boxscore
15/03/1981	City of Sydney Astronauts	87–79	Coburg Giants	Alexandria Stadium	N/A	boxscore
15/03/1981	Nunawading Spectres	86–61	West Adelaide Bearcats	Burwood Stadium	N/A	boxscore

=== Round 5 ===
Date	Home	Score	Away	Venue	Crowd	Box Score
21/03/1981	West Adelaide Bearcats	104–66	Illawarra Hawks	Apollo Entertainment Centre	N/A	boxscore
21/03/1981	Canberra Cannons	88–89	Bankstown Bruins	AIS Arena	N/A	boxscore
21/03/1981	Coburg Giants	64–66	Nunawading Spectres	Ken Watson Stadium	N/A	boxscore
21/03/1981	Newcastle Falcons	85–83	St. Kilda Saints	Newcastle Sports Entertainment Centre	N/A	boxscore
22/03/1981	Forestville Eagles	94–88	Illawarra Hawks	Apollo Entertainment Centre	N/A	boxscore
22/03/1981	Brisbane Bullets	100–72	Bankstown Bruins	Auchenflower Stadium	N/A	boxscore
22/03/1981	Launceston Casino City	80–83	Nunawading Spectres	Dowling Street Stadium	N/A	boxscore
22/03/1981	City of Sydney Astronauts	85–99	St. Kilda Saints	Alexandria Stadium	N/A	boxscore

=== Round 6 ===
Date	Home	Score	Away	Venue	Crowd	Box Score
28/03/1981	Illawarra Hawks	85–91	Newcastle Falcons	Beaton Park Stadium	N/A	boxscore
28/03/1981	Coburg Giants	78–76	Canberra Cannons	Ken Watson Stadium	N/A	boxscore
28/03/1981	St. Kilda Saints	66–73	Brisbane Bullets	Albert Park Basketball Stadium	N/A	boxscore
28/03/1981	Forestville Eagles	65–67	City of Sydney Astronauts	Apollo Entertainment Centre	N/A	boxscore
28/03/1981	Bankstown Bruins	77–86	Newcastle Falcons	Bankstown Basketball Stadium	N/A	boxscore
29/03/1981	Launceston Casino City	88–76	Canberra Cannons	Dowling Street Stadium	N/A	boxscore
29/03/1981	Nunawading Spectres	63–67	Brisbane Bullets	Burwood Stadium	N/A	boxscore
29/03/1981	West Adelaide Bearcats	89–107	City of Sydney Astronauts	Apollo Entertainment Centre	N/A	boxscore

=== Round 7 ===
Date	Home	Score	Away	Venue	Crowd	Box Score
4/04/1981	Nunawading Spectres	79–61	Bankstown Bruins	Burwood Stadium	N/A	boxscore
4/04/1981	Newcastle Falcons	79–78	Brisbane Bullets	Newcastle Sports Entertainment Centre	N/A	boxscore
4/04/1981	Forestville Eagles	80–77	Launceston Casino City	Apollo Entertainment Centre	N/A	boxscore
5/04/1981	City of Sydney Astronauts	65–95	Brisbane Bullets	Alexandria Stadium	N/A	boxscore
5/04/1981	St. Kilda Saints	98–97	Bankstown Bruins	Albert Park Basketball Stadium	N/A	boxscore
5/04/1981	West Adelaide Bearcats	91–90	Launceston Casino City	Apollo Entertainment Centre	N/A	boxscore

=== Round 8 ===
Date	Home	Score	Away	Venue	Crowd	Box Score
11/04/1981	Canberra Cannons	98–82	West Adelaide Bearcats	AIS Arena	N/A	boxscore
11/04/1981	St. Kilda Saints	101–91	Coburg Giants	Albert Park Basketball Stadium	N/A	boxscore
11/04/1981	Newcastle Falcons	70–73	Launceston Casino City	Perry Lakes Basketball Stadium	N/A	boxscore
11/04/1981	Illawarra Hawks	97–76	Forestville Eagles	Beaton Park Stadium	N/A	boxscore
12/04/1981	Bankstown Bruins	90–98	Forestville Eagles	Bankstown Basketball Stadium	N/A	boxscore
12/04/1918	Brisbane Bullets	62–71	West Adelaide Bearcats	Ballarat Stadium	N/A	boxscore
12/04/1981	Nunawading Spectres	78–65	Coburg Giants	Kilsyth Stadium	N/A	boxscore
12/04/1981	City of Sydney Astronauts	83–98	Launceston Casino City	Alexandria Stadium	N/A	boxscore

=== Round 9 ===
Date	Home	Score	Away	Venue	Crowd	Box Score
15/04/1981	Bankstown Bruins	91–78	Illawarra Hawks	Bankstown Basketball Stadium	N/A	boxscore
16/04/1981	St. Kilda Saints	79–76	Nunawading Spectres	Albert Park Basketball Stadium	N/A	boxscore
18/04/1981	Newcastle Falcons	83–60	City of Sydney Astronauts	Newcastle Sports Entertainment Centre	N/A	boxscore
19/04/1981	Brisbane Bullets	80–63	Canberra Cannons	Auchenflower Stadium	N/A	boxscore

=== Round 10 ===
Date	Home	Score	Away	Venue	Crowd	Box Score
25/04/1981	Canberra Cannons	76–69	Illawarra Hawks	AIS Arena	N/A	boxscore
25/04/1981	Launceston Casino City	92–81	Bankstown Bruins	Dowling Street Stadium	N/A	boxscore
25/04/1981	Newcastle Falcons	75–70	Nunawading Spectres	Newcastle Sports Entertainment Centre	N/A	boxscore
26/04/1981	West Adelaide Bearcats	81–80	St. Kilda Saints	Apollo Entertainment Centre	N/A	boxscore
26/04/1981	Coburg Giants	92–64	Bankstown Bruins	Ken Watson Stadium	N/A	boxscore
26/04/1981	City of Sydney Astronauts	71–95	Nunawading Spectres	Alexandria Stadium	N/A	boxscore
26/04/1981	Forestville Eagles	88–115	St. Kilda Saints	Apollo Entertainment Centre	N/A	boxscore

=== Round 11 ===
Date	Home	Score	Away	Venue	Crowd	Box Score
2/05/1981	Illawarra Hawks	98–81	City of Sydney Astronauts	Beaton Park Stadium	N/A	boxscore
2/05/1981	Nunawading Spectres	73–68	Canberra Cannons	Burwood Stadium	N/A	boxscore
2/05/1981	Launceston Casino City	79–80	Newcastle Falcons	Dowling Street Stadium	N/A	boxscore
2/05/1981	West Adelaide Bearcats	85–79	Brisbane Bullets	Apollo Entertainment Centre	N/A	boxscore
3/05/1981	Bankstown Bruins	96–78	City of Sydney Astronauts	Bankstown Basketball Stadium	N/A	boxscore
3/05/1981	St. Kilda Saints	99–88	Canberra Cannons	Albert Park Basketball Stadium	N/A	boxscore
3/05/1981	Coburg Giants	85–78	Newcastle Falcons	Ken Watson Stadium	N/A	boxscore
3/05/1981	Forestville Eagles	76–95	Brisbane Bullets	Apollo Entertainment Centre	N/A	boxscore

=== Round 12 ===
Date	Home	Score	Away	Venue	Crowd	Box Score
9/05/1981	Illawarra Hawks	108–91	West Adelaide Bearcats	Beaton Park Stadium	N/A	boxscore
9/05/1981	Canberra Cannons	81–71	Coburg Giants	AIS Arena	N/A	boxscore
9/05/1981	Nunawading Spectres	70–73	Launceston Casino City	Burwood Stadium	N/A	boxscore
9/05/1981	Newcastle Falcons	107–96	Forestville Eagles	Newcastle Sports Entertainment Centre	N/A	boxscore
10/05/1981	Bankstown Bruins	77–68	West Adelaide Bearcats	Bankstown Basketball Stadium	N/A	boxscore
10/05/1981	Brisbane Bullets	71–77	Coburg Giants	Auchenflower Stadium	N/A	boxscore
10/05/1981	St. Kilda Saints	120–95	Launceston Casino City	Albert Park Basketball Stadium	N/A	boxscore
10/05/1981	City of Sydney Astronauts	79–76	Forestville Eagles	Alexandria Stadium	N/A	boxscore

=== Round 13 ===
Date	Home	Score	Away	Venue	Crowd	Box Score
16/05/1981	Illawarra Hawks	76–74	Nunawading Spectres	Beaton Park Stadium	N/A	boxscore
16/05/1981	Canberra Cannons	88–71	City of Sydney Astronauts	AIS Arena	N/A	boxscore
16/05/1981	Coburg Giants	72–65	Forestville Eagles	Ken Watson Stadium	N/A	boxscore
17/05/1981	Bankstown Bruins	76–69	Nunawading Spectres	Bankstown Basketball Stadium	N/A	boxscore
17/05/1981	Brisbane Bullets	73–63	City of Sydney Astronauts	Auchenflower Stadium	N/A	boxscore
17/05/1981	Launceston Casino City	114–90	Forestville Eagles	Dowling Street Stadium	N/A	boxscore

=== Round 14 ===
Date	Home	Score	Away	Venue	Crowd	Box Score
23/05/1981	Newcastle Falcons	87–73	Bankstown Bruins	Newcastle Sports Entertainment Centre	N/A	boxscore
23/05/1981	Launceston Casino City	95–78	Illawarra Hawks	Dowling Street Stadium	N/A	boxscore
23/05/1981	Canberra Cannons	99–95	St. Kilda Saints	AIS Arena	N/A	boxscore
23/05/1981	Forestville Eagles	74–96	Nunawading Spectres	Apollo Entertainment Centre	N/A	boxscore
24/05/1981	Coburg Giants	84–81	Illawarra Hawks	Ken Watson Stadium	N/A	boxscore
24/05/1981	City of Sydney Astronauts	92–79	Bankstown Bruins	Alexandria Stadium	N/A	boxscore
24/05/1981	Brisbane Bullets	68–90	St. Kilda Saints	Auchenflower Stadium	N/A	boxscore
24/05/1981	West Adelaide Bearcats	98–77	Nunawading Spectres	Apollo Entertainment Centre	N/A	boxscore

=== Round 15 ===
Date	Home	Score	Away	Venue	Crowd	Box Score
30/05/1981	Illawarra Hawks	90–80	Brisbane Bullets	Beaton Park Stadium	N/A	boxscore
30/05/1981	Forestville Eagles	75–73	Canberra Cannons	Apollo Entertainment Centre	N/A	boxscore
30/05/1981	Launceston Casino City	72–76	City of Sydney Astronauts	Dowling Street Stadium	N/A	boxscore
30/05/1981	Nunawading Spectres	82–61	Newcastle Falcons	Burwood Stadium	N/A	boxscore
31/05/1981	Bankstown Bruins	65–66	Brisbane Bullets	Bankstown Basketball Stadium	N/A	boxscore
31/05/1981	West Adelaide Bearcats	113–82	Canberra Cannons	Apollo Entertainment Centre	N/A	boxscore
31/05/1981	Coburg Giants	84–80	City of Sydney Astronauts	Ken Watson Stadium	N/A	boxscore
31/05/1981	St. Kilda Saints	96–93	Newcastle Falcons	Albert Park Basketball Stadium	N/A	boxscore

=== Round 16 ===
Date	Home	Score	Away	Venue	Crowd	Box Score
6/06/1981	Illawarra Hawks	100–102	St. Kilda Saints	Beaton Park Stadium	N/A	boxscore
6/06/1981	Canberra Cannons	76–65	Newcastle Falcons	AIS Arena	N/A	boxscore
6/06/1981	Coburg Giants	66–72	West Adelaide Bearcats	Ken Watson Stadium	N/A	boxscore
7/06/1981	Bankstown Bruins	87–118	St. Kilda Saints	Bankstown Basketball Stadium	N/A	boxscore
7/06/1981	Brisbane Bullets	90–74	Newcastle Falcons	Auchenflower Stadium	N/A	boxscore
7/06/1981	Launceston Casino City	95–82	West Adelaide Bearcats	Dowling Street Stadium	N/A	boxscore

=== Round 17 ===
Date	Home	Score	Away	Venue	Crowd	Box Score
13/06/1981	Canberra Cannons	76–63	Launceston Casino City	AIS Arena	N/A	boxscore
13/06/1981	Illawarra Hawks	87–85	Coburg Giants	Beaton Park Stadium	N/A	boxscore
13/06/1981	Nunawading Spectres	77–62	Forestville Eagles	Burwood Stadium	N/A	boxscore
13/06/1981	Newcastle Falcons	79–80	West Adelaide Bearcats	Newcastle Sports Entertainment Centre	N/A	boxscore
14/06/1981	Bankstown Bruins	92–88	Coburg Giants	Bankstown Basketball Stadium	N/A	boxscore
14/06/1981	Brisbane Bullets	81–82	Launceston Casino City	Auchenflower Stadium	N/A	boxscore
14/06/1981	St. Kilda Saints	115–98	Forestville Eagles	Albert Park Basketball Stadium	N/A	boxscore
14/06/1981	City of Sydney Astronauts	89–83	West Adelaide Bearcats	Alexandria Stadium	N/A	boxscore

=== Round 18 ===
Date	Home	Score	Away	Venue	Crowd	Box Score
18/06/1981	Nunawading Spectres	83–85	St. Kilda Saints	Kilsyth Stadium	N/A	boxscore
20/06/1981	Illawarra Hawks	98–86	Bankstown Bruins	Beaton Park Stadium	N/A	boxscore
20/06/1981	Canberra Cannons	71–69	Brisbane Bullets	AIS Arena	N/A	boxscore
20/06/1981	Launceston Casino City	90–81	Coburg Giants	Dowling Street Stadium	N/A	boxscore
20/06/1981	West Adelaide Bearcats	75–73	Forestville Eagles	Apollo Entertainment Centre	N/A	boxscore
21/06/1981	Brisbane Bullets	82–69	Illawarra Hawks	Auchenflower Stadium	N/A	boxscore
21/06/1981	Coburg Giants	71–78	Launceston Casino City	Ken Watson Stadium	N/A	boxscore
21/06/1981	City of Sydney Astronauts	94–93	Newcastle Falcons	Alexandria Stadium	N/A	boxscore

== Ladder ==
Pos	1981 NBL season											
Pos	Team	Pld	W	L	PCT	Last 5	Streak	Home	Away	PF	PA	PP
1	St. Kilda Saints^{1}	22	17	5	77.27%	5–0	W6	10–1	7–4	2134	1927	110.74%
2	Launceston Casino City	22	14	8	63.64%	4–1	W3	7–4	7–4	1895	1810	104.70%
3	West Adelaide Bearcats^{2}	22	13	9	59.09%	3–2	W1	10–1	3–8	1848	1823	101.37%
4	Nunawading Spectres^{2}	22	13	9	59.09%	3–2	L1	8–3	5–6	1706	1566	108.94%
5	Brisbane Bullets^{1 2 3}	22	13	9	59.09%	3–2	W1	6–5	7–4	1712	1592	107.54%
6	Newcastle Falcons^{2 3}	22	13	9	59.09%	0–5	L6	9–2	4–7	1779	1714	103.79%
7	Canberra Cannons	22	12	10	54.55%	3–2	W3	10–1	2–9	1700	1719	98.89%
8	Illawarra Hawks	22	9	13	40.91%	3–2	L1	8–3	1–10	1889	1949	96.92%
9	City of Sydney Astronauts	22	8	14	36.36%	4–1	W2	5–6	3–8	1711	1898	90.15%
10	Coburg Giants^{4}	22	7	15	31.82%	0–5	L5	6–5	1–10	1690	1746	96.79%
11	Bankstown Bruins^{4}	22	7	15	31.82%	1–4	L1	5–6	2–9	1746	1897	92.04%
12	Forestville Eagles	22	6	16	27.27%	1–4	L3	5–6	1–10	1719	1888	91.05%

Updated to match(es) played on 21 June 1981. Source: NBL.com.au

The NBL tie-breaker system as outlined in the NBL Rules and Regulations states that in the case of an identical win–loss record, the results in games played between the teams will determine order of seeding.

^{1}St. Kilda Saints chose to participate in the 1981 FIBA Club World Cup in Brazil, instead of the 1981 NBL Finals. They were replaced by the Brisbane Bullets.

^{2}4-way Head-to-Head between West Adelaide Bearcats (5-1), Nunawading Spectres (3-3), Brisbane Bullets (2-4) and Newcastle Falcons (2-4).

^{3}Head-to-Head between Brisbane Bullets and Newcastle Falcons (1-1). Brisbane Bullets won For and Against (+15).

^{4}Head-to-Head between Coburg Giants and Bankstown Bruins (1-1). Coburg Giants won For and Against (+24).

== Finals ==
The NBL finals series in 1981 consisted of two semifinal games, and one championship-deciding grand final. All three of these finals games were sudden death.

=== Playoff bracket ===
Semifinals
1	Launceston Casino City	71
4	Brisbane Bullets	69
2	West Adelaide Bearcats	71
3	Nunawading Spectres	74

Grand Final
1	Launceston Casino City	75
2	Nunawading Spectres	54

=== Semifinals ===
Date	Home	Score	Away	Venue	Crowd	Box Score
27/06/1981	Launceston Casino City	71–69	Brisbane Bullets	Apollo Entertainment Centre	N/A	boxscore
27/06/1981	West Adelaide Bearcats	71–74	Nunawading Spectres	Apollo Entertainment Centre	N/A	boxscore

=== Grand Final ===
Date	Home	Score	Away	Venue	Crowd	Box Score
28/06/1981	Launceston Casino City	75–54	Nunawading Spectres	Apollo Entertainment Centre	N/A	boxscore

== Awards ==
=== Statistics leaders ===
Category	Player	Team	Stat
Points	Mike Jones	Illawarra Hawks	671 pts / 22 games
Free throw percentage	Mike Jones	Illawarra Hawks	87.6% (113/129)

=== Regular season ===
- Most Valuable Player: Mike Jones (Illawarra Hawks)
- Best Defensive Player: Ray Wood (West Adelaide Bearcats)
- Coach of the Year: Bob Turner (Newcastle Falcons)
- All-NBL Team:
  - Rocky Smith (St Kilda Saints)
  - Danny Morseu (St Kilda Saints)
  - Al Green (West Adelaide Bearcats)
  - Dave Nelson (Canberra Cannons)
  - Owen Wells (Newcastle Falcons)
