= List of National Basketball League (Australia) awards =

The National Basketball League (NBL) presents 8 annual awards to recognize its teams, players, and coaches for their accomplishments. This does not include the NBL championship trophy, which is given to the winning team of the NBL Championship Series.

As of the 2023–24 season, coaches and captains from each team, and a panel of experts, vote for the MVP, while the head coach, assistant coach and captain of each team vote for the Coach of the Year, Sixth Man of the Year, Defensive Player of the Year, Most Improved Player, Next Generation Award and All-NBL Teams.

== Team trophies ==
Award	Created	Description	Most recent winner
NBL Championship Trophy (Dr John Raschke Trophy)	1979	The NBL's championship trophy; awarded to the winning team of the NBL Grand Final / Championship Series.	Sydney Kings

== Honours ==
Honor	Created	Description
All-NBL Team	1980	Two five-player teams (a first and second team) composed of the best players in the league following every NBL season as chosen via a voting system involving the head coach, one assistant coach and the team captain of each team.

== Individual awards ==
Award	Created	Description	Most recent winner(s)
Most Valuable Player (Andrew Gaze Trophy)	1979	Awarded to the best performing player of the NBL regular season.	Bryce Cotton (Adelaide 36ers)
Championship Series Most Valuable Player (Larry Sengstock Medal)	1979	Awarded to the best performing player of the NBL Grand Final / Championship Series.	Kendric Davis (Sydney Kings)
Fans MVP	2016	Awarded to the best performing player of the NBL regular season, as voted on by fans.	Bryce Cotton (Adelaide 36ers)
Best Defensive Player	1980	Awarded to the best defensive player of the NBL regular season.	John Brown (South East Melbourne Phoenix)
Best Sixth Man	1996	Awarded to the best performing reserve player (or sixth man) of the NBL regular season.	Angus Glover (South East Melbourne Phoenix)
Most Improved Player	1988	Awarded to the most improved player of the NBL regular season.	Flynn Cameron (Adelaide 36ers)
Next Generation	2023	Awarded to the best under-25 prospect of the NBL regular season.	Sam Mennenga (New Zealand Breakers)
Coach of the Year (Lindsay Gaze Trophy)	1980	Awarded to the best coach of the NBL regular season.	Brian Goorjian (Sydney Kings)

== See also ==
- List of WNBL awards
- NBL1 Awards
- List of National Basketball League (New Zealand) awards
