= Ken Richardson (basketball) =

American basketball player (1950–2013)

Personal information
- Born: May 24, 1950 Zanesville, Ohio, U.S.
- Died: October 22, 2013 (aged 63) Darwin, Northern Territory, Australia
- Listed height: 198 cm (6 ft 6 in)

Career information
- College: Ohio Dominican (1970–1973)
- Playing career: 1974–1982
- Position: Forward
- Coaching career: 1978–1987

Career history

Playing
- 1974–1975: West Adelaide Bearcats
- 1976–1977: St Kilda Saints
- 1978–1982: West Adelaide Bearcats

Coaching
- 1978–1982: West Adelaide Bearcats
- 1986–1987: Geelong Cats

Career highlights
- NBL champion (1982); NBL Most Valuable Player (1979); All-NBL Team (1980); 6× SA State League champion (1975, 1978–1982); Woollacott Medalist (1975); NAIA All-District 22 Honorable Mention (1973); First-team All-MOC (1971)

Ken Richardson (May 24, 1950 – October 22, 2013) was an American basketball player who played his entire professional career in Australia. He became a South Australian basketball icon playing for the West Adelaide Bearcats in the SA State League and the National Basketball League (NBL). Richardson, who played his college basketball at Ohio Dominican University and was a Mid Ohio Conference First Team selection in 1970–71, joined West Adelaide in 1974, winning the 1975 Woollacott Medal en route to his first SA state championship. He went on to win the NBL's inaugural Most Valuable Player award in 1979 and led the Bearcats to the NBL championship in 1982 as player-coach.

== Early life ==
Richardson was born in Zanesville, Ohio. From junior college in Florida, he attended university in Ohio and was invited to attend a Houston Rockets' camp, albeit at his own expense. In 1970–71 and 1972–73, Richardson played for Ohio Dominican University's men's basketball team. In 1970–71, he earned first-team All-MOC honors, and in 1972–73, he was named NAIA All-District 22 Honorable Mention. Richardson scored 1,207 points in two seasons at Ohio Dominican, earning him a place in the school's 1,000-point club.

Growing up in Ohio, Richardson was an expert tracker. It made him invaluable in Vietnam as a soldier leading men into battle.

== Professional career ==
Richardson arrived wide-eyed in Adelaide in 1974 after having turned his back on an NBA career. At 6'6", he was considered a wiry forward who could play center. He joined the West Adelaide Bearcats and led them to the 1974 grand final. A year later, he won the 1975 Woollacott Medal en route to his first South Australian (SA) state championship. He became the first American to claim the Woollacott Medal, an honor bestowed on the Fairest and Most Brilliant player in the SA State League.

For the next two years he dominated in Victoria playing with national powerhouse St Kilda, helping them win the 1977 Australian Club Championship title. He returned to the Bearcats in 1978 and helped them win five straight SA championship titles as player-coach from 1978–82. During this time, in 1979, the National Basketball League (NBL) was established. Richardson was crowned the NBL's inaugural Most Valuable Player before earning All-NBL Team honors the following year.

As West's playing coach for four years of NBL, Richardson steered them to fourth, second, third and first. After losing the 1980 grand final significantly to his former team St Kilda and its superstar import guard Rocky Smith, Richardson said he needed a player to counter him. That brought Al Green to the Bearcats in 1981 and a year later, Richardson recruited Leroy Loggins. The trio went on to lead the Bearcats to their first and only NBL championship in 1982. West's 1982 NBL championship team is the only one to include three league MVPs, with Green winning in 1982 and Loggins collecting three outstanding individual player awards in 1984, 1986 and 1987.

Richardson retired from playing following the 1982 season. He is considered one of the league's three greatest imports, alongside Leroy Loggins and Rocky Smith. In 71 NBL games, he averaged 20.2 points per game. In November 2012, West Adelaide inducted Richardson into the club's Hall of Fame.

In 1986, Richardson coached the Geelong Cats in the NBL to a 14–12 record, missing the playoffs on percentage. That year, the team won the VBA championship. He coached the team again in 1987.

== Personal life ==
In the late 1970s, Richardson considered taking out Australian citizenship. On the assumption he would, then Boomers coach Lindsay Gaze suited him up for Australia to play against a visiting US college team, making Richardson the only American who was solely an American to officially play for Australia.

Post-basketball, Richardson worked on oil rigs and on the MS Princess of Tasmania, having a love of the ocean and the open sea. He was also a supporter of the Maritime Workers' Union.

=== Death ===
Richardson died peacefully in a Darwin hospital on October 22, 2013, losing his battle with cancer. He was 63 years old.
