= Slacke =

Slacke is a surname. Notable people with the surname include:

- Francis Slacke (1853–1940), senior officer in the Indian Civil Service
- Jim Slacke (born 1953), American basketball player
