= 1980 NBL season =

- League: National Basketball League
- Sport: Basketball
- Duration: 2 February–8 June 1980 (Regular season); 14–15 June 1980 (Finals)
- Games: 22
- Teams: 12
- TV partner: ABC

Regular season
- Season champions: St. Kilda Saints
- Season MVP: Rocky Smith (St. Kilda)
- Top scorer: Rocky Smith (St. Kilda)

Finals
- Champions: St. Kilda Saints (2nd title)
- Runners-up: West Adelaide Bearcats
- Grand Final MVP: Rocky Smith (St. Kilda)

NBL seasons
- ← 1979 1981 →

The 1980 NBL season was the 2nd season of the National Basketball League (NBL).

== Off-Season Changes ==
- Glenelg Tigers withdrew from the league.
- Coburg Giants, West Torrens Eagles and Launceston Casino City Tigers joined.
- David Claxton replaced Robert Young as Head Coach of Brisbane Bullets.
- Adrian Hurley replaced Joe Farrugia as Head Coach of Illawarra Hawks.
- Dean Donnollon replaced Bob Turner as Head Coach of Newcastle Falcons.

== Regular season ==
The 1980 regular season took place over 18 rounds between 2 February 1980 and 8 June 1980. Each team played 22 games, against every opponent twice.

=== Round 1 ===
Date	Home	Score	Away	Venue	Crowd	Box Score
2/02/1980	West Torrens Eagles	78–64	Nunawading Spectres	Apollo Entertainment Centre	N/A	boxscore
2/02/1980	Canberra Cannons	77–69	Launceston Casino City	Canberra Showgrounds	N/A	boxscore
2/02/1980	Coburg Giants	76–73	Illawarra Hawks	Ken Watson Stadium	N/A	boxscore
2/02/1980	Newcastle Falcons	73–69	Bankstown Bruins	Newcastle Sports Entertainment Centre	N/A	boxscore
3/02/1980	West Adelaide Bearcats	78–71	Nunawading Spectres	Apollo Entertainment Centre	N/A	boxscore
3/02/1980	Brisbane Bullets	83–71	Launceston Casino City	Auchenflower Stadium	N/A	boxscore
3/02/1980	St. Kilda Saints	68–74	Illawarra Hawks	Albert Park Basketball Stadium	N/A	boxscore
3/02/1980	City of Sydney Astronauts	74–86	Bankstown Bruins	Alexandria Stadium	N/A	boxscore

=== Round 2 ===
Date	Home	Score	Away	Venue	Crowd	Box Score
8/02/1980	St. Kilda Saints	109–70	Canberra Cannons	Albert Park Basketball Stadium	N/A	boxscore
9/02/1980	Nunawading Spectres	54–51	Coburg Giants	Burwood Stadium	N/A	boxscore
9/02/1980	Newcastle Falcons	86–88	St. Kilda Saints	Newcastle Sports Entertainment Centre	N/A	boxscore
9/02/1980	Bankstown Bruins	95–74	West Torrens Eagles	Bankstown Basketball Stadium	N/A	boxscore
9/02/1980	Canberra Cannons	78–68	West Adelaide Bearcats	Canberra Showgrounds	N/A	boxscore
10/02/1980	Launceston Casino City	83–80	Coburg Giants	Dowling Street Stadium	N/A	boxscore
10/02/1980	City of Sydney Astronauts	71–84	St. Kilda Saints	Alexandria Stadium	N/A	boxscore
10/02/1980	Illawarra Hawks	101–77	West Torrens Eagles	Beaton Park Stadium	N/A	boxscore
10/02/1980	Brisbane Bullets	91–86	West Adelaide Bearcats	Auchenflower Stadium	N/A	boxscore

=== Round 3 ===
Date	Home	Score	Away	Venue	Crowd	Box Score
16/02/1980	West Adelaide Bearcats	91–89	Newcastle Falcons	Apollo Entertainment Centre	N/A	boxscore
16/02/1980	Nunawading Spectres	85–66	City of Sydney Astronauts	Burwood Stadium	N/A	boxscore
16/02/1980	St. Kilda Saints	94–74	Brisbane Bullets	Albert Park Basketball Stadium	N/A	boxscore
16/02/1980	Canberra Cannons	56–78	Illawarra Hawks	Canberra Showgrounds	N/A	boxscore
17/02/1980	West Torrens Eagles	86–88	Newcastle Falcons	Apollo Entertainment Centre	N/A	boxscore
17/02/1980	Launceston Casino City	101–77	City of Sydney Astronauts	Dowling Street Stadium	N/A	boxscore
17/02/1980	Coburg Giants	71–83	Brisbane Bullets	Ken Watson Stadium	N/A	boxscore
17/02/1980	Bankstown Bruins	66–69	Canberra Cannons	Bankstown Basketball Stadium	N/A	boxscore

=== Round 4 ===
Date	Home	Score	Away	Venue	Crowd	Box Score
23/02/1980	Brisbane Bullets	83–77	Nunawading Spectres	Auchenflower Stadium	N/A	boxscore
23/02/1980	Coburg Giants	85–80	Launceston Casino City	Ken Watson Stadium	N/A	boxscore
23/02/1980	Newcastle Falcons	71–73	Illawarra Hawks	Newcastle Sports Entertainment Centre	N/A	boxscore
23/02/1980	West Torrens Eagles	79–73	Bankstown Bruins	Apollo Entertainment Centre	N/A	boxscore
24/02/1980	City of Sydney Astronauts	75–97	Nunawading Spectres	Alexandria Stadium	N/A	boxscore
24/02/1980	St. Kilda Saints	90–74	Launceston Casino City	Albert Park Basketball Stadium	N/A	boxscore
24/02/1980	Illawarra Hawks	72–65	Canberra Cannons	Beaton Park Stadium	N/A	boxscore
24/02/1980	West Adelaide Bearcats	84–82	Bankstown Bruins	Apollo Entertainment Centre	N/A	boxscore

=== Round 5 ===
Date	Home	Score	Away	Venue	Crowd	Box Score
27/02/1980	Bankstown Bruins	82–83	Illawarra Hawks	Bankstown Basketball Stadium	N/A	boxscore
1/03/1980	Newcastle Falcons	71–68	Coburg Giants	Newcastle Sports Entertainment Centre	N/A	boxscore
1/03/1980	Bankstown Bruins	84–100	St. Kilda Saints	Bankstown Basketball Stadium	N/A	boxscore
1/03/1980	Canberra Cannons	81–65	West Torrens Eagles	Canberra Showgrounds	N/A	boxscore
1/03/1980	Nunawading Spectres	83–73	West Adelaide Bearcats	Burwood Stadium	N/A	boxscore
2/03/1980	City of Sydney Astronauts	73–70	Coburg Giants	Alexandria Stadium	N/A	boxscore
2/03/1980	Illawarra Hawks	83–101	St. Kilda Saints	Beaton Park Stadium	N/A	boxscore
2/03/1980	Brisbane Bullets	84–80	West Torrens Eagles	Auchenflower Stadium	N/A	boxscore
2/03/1980	Launceston Casino City	65–84	West Adelaide Bearcats	Dowling Street Stadium	N/A	boxscore

=== Round 6 ===
Date	Home	Score	Away	Venue	Crowd	Box Score
8/03/1980	Illawarra Hawks	101–98	Newcastle Falcons	Beaton Park Stadium	N/A	boxscore
8/03/1980	West Adelaide Bearcats	93–70	City of Sydney Astronauts	Apollo Entertainment Centre	N/A	boxscore
8/03/1980	Launceston Casino City	81–99	Brisbane Bullets	Dowling Street Stadium	N/A	boxscore
9/03/1980	Bankstown Bruins	105–95	Newcastle Falcons	Bankstown Basketball Stadium	N/A	boxscore
9/03/1980	West Torrens Eagles	70–72	City of Sydney Astronauts	Apollo Entertainment Centre	N/A	boxscore
9/03/1980	Nunawading Spectres	58–56	Brisbane Bullets	Burwood Stadium	N/A	boxscore
9/03/1980	Coburg Giants	58–73	Canberra Cannons	Ken Watson Stadium	N/A	boxscore

=== Round 7 ===
Date	Home	Score	Away	Venue	Crowd	Box Score
15/03/1980	Coburg Giants	47–69	Nunawading Spectres	Ken Watson Stadium	N/A	boxscore
15/03/1980	Newcastle Falcons	86–87	Launceston Casino City	Newcastle Sports Entertainment Centre	N/A	boxscore
15/03/1980	West Torrens Eagles	66–83	Illawarra Hawks	Apollo Entertainment Centre	N/A	boxscore
15/03/1980	Canberra Cannons	69–68	Bankstown Bruins	Canberra Showgrounds	N/A	boxscore
16/03/1980	St. Kilda Saints	94–84	Nunawading Spectres	Albert Park Basketball Stadium	N/A	boxscore
16/03/1980	City of Sydney Astronauts	87–86	Launceston Casino City	Alexandria Stadium	N/A	boxscore
16/03/1980	West Adelaide Bearcats	104–68	Illawarra Hawks	Apollo Entertainment Centre	N/A	boxscore
16/03/1980	Brisbane Bullets	104–53	Bankstown Bruins	Auchenflower Stadium	N/A	boxscore

=== Round 8 ===
Date	Home	Score	Away	Venue	Crowd	Box Score
19/03/1980	Bankstown Bruins	73–82	City of Sydney Astronauts	Bankstown Basketball Stadium	N/A	boxscore
22/03/1980	Bankstown Bruins	65–94	Coburg Giants	Bankstown Basketball Stadium	N/A	boxscore
22/03/1980	Canberra Cannons	95–69	St. Kilda Saints	Canberra Showgrounds	N/A	boxscore
22/03/1980	Launceston Casino City	96–71	West Torrens Eagles	Dowling Street Stadium	N/A	boxscore
22/03/1980	Newcastle Falcons	81–77	West Adelaide Bearcats	Newcastle Sports Entertainment Centre	N/A	boxscore
23/03/1980	Illawarra Hawks	70–74	Coburg Giants	Beaton Park Stadium	N/A	boxscore
23/03/1980	Brisbane Bullets	94–75	St. Kilda Saints	Auchenflower Stadium	N/A	boxscore
23/03/1980	Nunawading Spectres	83–71	West Torrens Eagles	Burwood Stadium	N/A	boxscore
23/03/1980	City of Sydney Astronauts	85–86	West Adelaide Bearcats	Alexandria Stadium	N/A	boxscore

=== Round 9 ===
Date	Home	Score	Away	Venue	Crowd	Box Score
29/03/1980	St. Kilda Saints	112–92	Newcastle Falcons	Albert Park Basketball Stadium	N/A	boxscore
29/03/1980	Illawarra Hawks	89–82	City of Sydney Astronauts	Beaton Park Stadium	N/A	boxscore
29/03/1980	West Adelaide Bearcats	92–70	Brisbane Bullets	Apollo Entertainment Centre	N/A	boxscore
29/03/1980	Launceston Casino City	59–81	Canberra Cannons	Dowling Street Stadium	N/A	boxscore
30/03/1980	Coburg Giants	75–76	Newcastle Falcons	Ken Watson Stadium	N/A	boxscore
30/03/1980	West Torrens Eagles	91–88	Brisbane Bullets	Apollo Entertainment Centre	N/A	boxscore
30/03/1980	Nunawading Spectres	73–59	Canberra Cannons	Burwood Stadium	N/A	boxscore

=== Round 10 ===
Date	Home	Score	Away	Venue	Crowd	Box Score
12/04/1980	Bankstown Bruins	63–76	Nunawading Spectres	Bankstown Basketball Stadium	N/A	boxscore
12/04/1980	West Torrens Eagles	77–61	Coburg Giants	Apollo Entertainment Centre	N/A	boxscore
12/04/1980	Brisbane Bullets	89–99	Newcastle Falcons	Auchenflower Stadium	N/A	boxscore
13/04/1980	Illawarra Hawks	88–89	Nunawading Spectres	Beaton Park Stadium	N/A	boxscore
13/04/1980	West Adelaide Bearcats	93–81	Coburg Giants	Apollo Entertainment Centre	N/A	boxscore
13/04/1980	Canberra Cannons	74–78	Newcastle Falcons	Canberra Showgrounds	N/A	boxscore

=== Round 11 ===
Date	Home	Score	Away	Venue	Crowd	Box Score
19/04/1980	Brisbane Bullets	95–78	Canberra Cannons	Auchenflower Stadium	N/A	boxscore
19/04/1980	Newcastle Falcons	88–65	City of Sydney Astronauts	Newcastle Sports Entertainment Centre	N/A	boxscore
19/04/1980	Illawarra Hawks	84–81	Bankstown Bruins	Beaton Park Stadium	N/A	boxscore
19/04/1980	Nunawading Spectres	69–68	Launceston Casino City	Burwood Stadium	N/A	boxscore
19/04/1980	Coburg Giants	84–91	St. Kilda Saints	Ken Watson Stadium	N/A	boxscore
19/04/1980	West Adelaide Bearcats	109–76	West Torrens Eagles	Apollo Entertainment Centre	N/A	boxscore

=== Round 12 ===
Date	Home	Score	Away	Venue	Crowd	Box Score
25/04/1980	Canberra Cannons	82–60	City of Sydney Astronauts	Canberra Showgrounds	N/A	boxscore
25/04/1980	Coburg Giants	98–71	West Torrens Eagles	Ken Watson Stadium	N/A	boxscore
26/04/1980	Nunawading Spectres	83–85	Illawarra Hawks	Burwood Stadium	N/A	boxscore
26/04/1980	Newcastle Falcons	85–86	Brisbane Bullets	Newcastle Sports Entertainment Centre	N/A	boxscore
27/04/1980	Launceston Casino City	95–83	Illawarra Hawks	Dowling Street Stadium	N/A	boxscore
27/04/1980	St. Kilda Saints	117–88	West Torrens Eagles	Albert Park Basketball Stadium	N/A	boxscore
27/04/1980	City of Sydney Astronauts	75–74	Brisbane Bullets	Alexandria Stadium	N/A	boxscore

=== Round 13 ===
Date	Home	Score	Away	Venue	Crowd	Box Score
3/05/1980	Newcastle Falcons	71–79	Nunawading Spectres	Newcastle Sports Entertainment Centre	N/A	boxscore
3/05/1980	West Adelaide Bearcats	102–93	Launceston Casino City	Apollo Entertainment Centre	N/A	boxscore
3/05/1980	Brisbane Bullets	81–84	Illawarra Hawks	Auchenflower Stadium	N/A	boxscore
3/05/1980	St. Kilda Saints	115–78	Bankstown Bruins	Albert Park Basketball Stadium	N/A	boxscore
4/05/1980	Canberra Cannons	84–56	Nunawading Spectres	Canberra Showgrounds	N/A	boxscore
4/05/1980	West Torrens Eagles	92–89	Launceston Casino City	Apollo Entertainment Centre	N/A	boxscore
4/05/1980	City of Sydney Astronauts	79–82	Illawarra Hawks	Alexandria Stadium	N/A	boxscore
4/05/1980	Coburg Giants	93–71	Bankstown Bruins	Ken Watson Stadium	N/A	boxscore

=== Round 14 ===
Date	Home	Score	Away	Venue	Crowd	Box Score
10/05/1980	Brisbane Bullets	98–95	Coburg Giants	Auchenflower Stadium	N/A	boxscore
10/05/1980	Nunawading Spectres	77–99	St. Kilda Saints	Burwood Stadium	N/A	boxscore
10/05/1980	Newcastle Falcons	84–72	West Torrens Eagles	Newcastle Sports Entertainment Centre	N/A	boxscore
10/05/1980	Bankstown Bruins	80–81	West Adelaide Bearcats	Bankstown Basketball Stadium	N/A	boxscore
11/05/1980	Canberra Cannons	96–87	Coburg Giants	Canberra Showgrounds	N/A	boxscore
11/05/1980	Launceston Casino City	106–92	St. Kilda Saints	Dowling Street Stadium	N/A	boxscore
11/05/1980	City of Sydney Astronauts	101–77	West Torrens Eagles	Alexandria Stadium	N/A	boxscore
11/05/1980	Illawarra Hawks	85–95	West Adelaide Bearcats	Beaton Park Stadium	N/A	boxscore

=== Round 15 ===
Date	Home	Score	Away	Venue	Crowd	Box Score
17/05/1980	Coburg Giants	101–76	City of Sydney Astronauts	Ken Watson Stadium	N/A	boxscore
17/05/1980	Bankstown Bruins	96–108	Brisbane Bullets	Bankstown Basketball Stadium	N/A	boxscore
17/05/1980	West Torrens Eagles	75–71	Canberra Cannons	Apollo Entertainment Centre	N/A	boxscore
17/05/1980	Launceston Casino City	95–104	Newcastle Falcons	Dowling Street Stadium	N/A	boxscore
18/05/1980	Nunawading Spectres	54–56	Newcastle Falcons	Burwood Stadium	N/A	boxscore
18/05/1980	St. Kilda Saints	113–105	City of Sydney Astronauts	Albert Park Basketball Stadium	N/A	boxscore
18/05/1980	Illawarra Hawks	80–87	Brisbane Bullets	Beaton Park Stadium	N/A	boxscore
18/05/1980	West Adelaide Bearcats	68–67	Canberra Cannons	Apollo Entertainment Centre	N/A	boxscore

=== Round 16 ===
Date	Home	Score	Away	Venue	Crowd	Box Score
24/05/1980	West Adelaide Bearcats	94–104	St. Kilda Saints	Apollo Entertainment Centre	N/A	boxscore
24/05/1980	Illawarra Hawks	79–80	Launceston Casino City	Beaton Park Stadium	N/A	boxscore
24/05/1980	Brisbane Bullets	103–72	City of Sydney Astronauts	Auchenflower Stadium	N/A	boxscore
25/05/1980	West Torrens Eagles	94–101	St. Kilda Saints	Apollo Entertainment Centre	N/A	boxscore
25/05/1980	Bankstown Bruins	84–96	Launceston Casino City	Bankstown Basketball Stadium	N/A	boxscore

=== Round 17 ===
Date	Home	Score	Away	Venue	Crowd	Box Score
31/05/1980	West Torrens Eagles	77–101	West Adelaide Bearcats	Apollo Entertainment Centre	N/A	boxscore
31/05/1980	St. Kilda Saints	105–89	Coburg Giants	Albert Park Basketball Stadium	N/A	boxscore
1/06/1980	City of Sydney Astronauts	80-87	Newcastle Falcons	Alexandria Stadium	N/A	boxscore
1/06/1980	Canberra Cannons	87–98	Brisbane Bullets	Canberra Showgrounds	N/A	boxscore
1/06/1980	Launceston Casino City	71–81	Nunawading Spectres	Dowling Street Stadium	N/A	boxscore

=== Round 18 ===
Date	Home	Score	Away	Venue	Crowd	Box Score
7/06/1980	St. Kilda Saints	88–90	West Adelaide Bearcats	Albert Park Basketball Stadium	N/A	boxscore
7/06/1980	Newcastle Falcons	70–68	Canberra Cannons	Newcastle Sports Entertainment Centre	N/A	boxscore
7/06/1980	Launceston Casino City	118-103	Bankstown Bruins	Dowling Street Stadium	N/A	boxscore
8/06/1980	Nunawading Spectres	98–64	Bankstown Bruins	Burwood Stadium	N/A	boxscore
8/06/1980	Coburg Giants	89–92	West Adelaide Bearcats	Ken Watson Stadium	N/A	boxscore
8/06/1980	City of Sydney Astronauts	90–81	Canberra Cannons	Alexandria Stadium	N/A	boxscore

== Ladder ==
Pos	1980 NBL season											
Pos	Team	Pld	W	L	PCT	Last 5	Streak	Home	Away	PF	PA	PP
1	St. Kilda Saints^{1}	22	17	5	77.27%	4–1	L1	9–2	8–3	2109	1886	111.82%
2	West Adelaide Bearcats^{1}	22	17	5	77.27%	4–1	W3	10–1	7–4	1941	1773	109.48%
3	Brisbane Bullets	22	15	7	68.18%	5–0	W5	9–2	6–5	1928	1780	108.31%
4	Nunawading Spectres	22	14	8	63.64%	2–3	W2	8–3	6–5	1660	1580	105.06%
5	Illawarra Hawks^{2}	22	13	9	59.09%	2–3	L3	5–6	8–3	1798	1790	100.45%
6	Newcastle Falcons^{2}	22	13	9	59.09%	5–0	W5	6–5	7–4	1828	1794	101.90%
7	Canberra Cannons	22	11	11	50.00%	0–5	L5	8–3	3–8	1661	1631	101.84%
8	Launceston Casino City	22	9	13	40.91%	3–2	W1	6–5	3–8	1863	1889	98.62%
9	Coburg Giants^{3}	22	7	15	31.82%	1-4	L2	5–6	2–9	1727	1740	99.25%
10	City of Sydney Astronauts^{3}	22	7	15	31.82%	1–4	W1	5–6	2–9	1717	1908	89.99%
11	West Torrens Eagles	22	6	16	27.27%	1–4	L2	6–5	0–11	1707	1940	87.99%
12	Bankstown Bruins	22	3	19	13.64%	0–5	L13	2–9	1–10	1721	1949	88.30%

Updated to match(es) played on 8 June 1980. Source: NBL.com.au

The NBL tie-breaker system as outlined in the NBL Rules and Regulations states that in the case of an identical win–loss record, the results in games played between the teams will determine order of seeding.

^{1}Head-to-Head between St. Kilda Saints and West Adelaide Bearcats (1-1). St. Kilda Saints won For and Against (+8).

^{2}Illawarra Hawks won Head-to-Head (2-0).

^{3}Head-to-Head between Coburg Giants and City of Sydney Astronauts (1-1). Coburg Giants won For and Against (+22).

== Finals ==
The NBL finals series in 1980 consisted of two semifinal games, and one championship-deciding grand final. All three of these finals games were sudden death.

=== Playoff bracket ===
Semifinals
1	St. Kilda Saints	101
4	Nunawading Spectres	77
2	West Adelaide Bearcats	101
3	Brisbane Bullets	94

Grand Final
1	St. Kilda Saints	113
2	West Adelaide Bearcats	88

=== Semifinals ===
Date	Home	Score	Away	Venue	Crowd	Box Score
14/06/1980	St. Kilda Saints	101–77	Nunawading Spectres	Dowling Street Stadium	N/A	boxscore
14/06/1980	West Adelaide Bearcats	101–94	Brisbane Bullets	Dowling Street Stadium	N/A	boxscore

=== Grand Final ===
Date	Home	Score	Away	Venue	Crowd	Box Score
15/06/1980	St. Kilda Saints	113–88	West Adelaide Bearcats	Dowling Street Stadium	N/A	boxscore

== Awards ==
=== Statistics leaders ===
Category	Player	Team	Stat
Points	Rocky Smith	St Kilda Saints	737 pts / 22 games
Free throw percentage	Jim Slacke	Illawarra Hawks	87.2% (68/78)

=== Regular season ===
- Most Valuable Player: Rocky Smith (St Kilda Saints)
- Best Defensive Player: Ray Wood (West Adelaide Bearcats)
- Coach of the Year: Barry Barnes (Nunawading Spectres)
- All-NBL Team:
  - Cal Stamp (Canberra Cannons)
  - Danny Morseu (St Kilda Saints)
  - Brian Banks (Brisbane Bullets)
  - Herb McEachin (Canberra Cannons)
  - Ian Davies (Launceston Casino City)
  - Ken Richardson (West Adelaide Bearcats)

=== Finals ===
- Grand Final MVP: Rocky Smith (St Kilda Saints)
