= 1979 NBL season =

- League: National Basketball League
- Sport: Basketball
- Duration: 24 February – 3 June 1979 (Regular season); 10 June 1979 (Grand Final)
- Games: 90 (Regular season); 1 (Grand Final)
- Teams: 10
- TV partner: ABC

Regular season
- Season champions: St. Kilda Saints
- Season MVP: Ken Richardson (West Adelaide)
- Top scorer: Cal Bruton (Brisbane)

Grand Final
- Champions: St. Kilda Saints (1st title)
- Runners-up: Canberra Cannons
- Grand Final MVP: Larry Sengstock (St. Kilda)

NBL seasons
- 1980 →

The 1979 NBL season was the inaugural season of the National Basketball League (NBL). The championship was decided by a sudden death Grand Final between first (St. Kilda Saints) and second (Canberra Cannons).

== Teams ==
Ten teams competed in the 1979 Season.

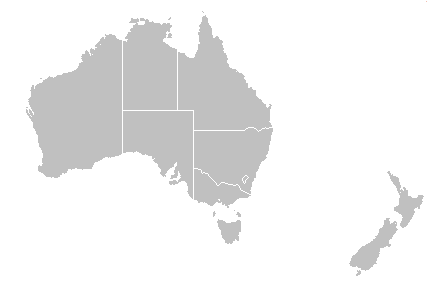

Club	Location	Stadium	Capacity	Founded	Head Coach
Bankstown Bruins	Sydney	Bankstown Basketball Stadium	2,500	1979	Shaun O'Connell
Brisbane Bullets	Brisbane	Auchenflower Stadium	2,000	1979	(Australia) Robert Young
Canberra Cannons	Canberra	Canberra Showgrounds	Unknown	1979	(United States) Cal Stamp
City of Sydney Astronauts	Sydney	Alexandria Stadium	Unknown	1979	(Australia) Charlie Ammit
Glenelg Tigers	Glenelg	Apollo Entertainment Centre	3,000	1979	(Australia) Alan Dawe
Illawarra Hawks	Wollongong	Beaton Park Stadium	2,000	1979	(Australia) Joe Farrugia
Newcastle Falcons	Newcastle	Newcastle Sports Entertainment Centre	2,200	1979	(United States) Bob Turner
Nunawading Spectres	Melbourne	Burwood Stadium	2,000	1979	(Australia) Barry Barnes
St. Kilda Saints	Melbourne	Albert Park Basketball Stadium	2,000	1979	(Australia) Brian Kerle
West Adelaide Bearcats	Port Adelaide	Apollo Entertainment Centre	3,000	1979	(Australia) Ken Richardson

== Regular season ==
The 1979 regular season took place over 15 rounds between 24 February 1979 and 3 June 1979.

Every team played 18 games, against each opponent twice.

=== Round 1 ===
Date	Home	Score	Away	Venue	Crowd	Box Score
24/02/1979	Nunawading Spectres	78–62	Newcastle Falcons	Burwood Stadium	N/A	boxscore
24/02/1979	Glenelg Tigers	68–65	City of Sydney Astronauts	Apollo Entertainment Centre	N/A	boxscore
24/02/1979	Brisbane Bullets	70–77	Canberra Cannons	Auchenflower Stadium	N/A	boxscore
25/02/1979	Bankstown Bruins	79–82	Canberra Cannons	Bankstown Basketball Stadium	N/A	boxscore
25/02/1979	St. Kilda Saints	107–81	Newcastle Falcons	Albert Park Basketball Stadium	N/A	boxscore
25/02/1979	West Adelaide Bearcats	101–77	City of Sydney Astronauts	Apollo Entertainment Centre	N/A	boxscore

=== Round 2 ===
Date	Home	Score	Away	Venue	Crowd	Box Score
3/03/1979	City of Sydney Astronauts	86–91	Canberra Cannons	Alexandria Stadium	N/A	boxscore
3/03/1979	Illawarra Hawks	91–88	St. Kilda Saints	Beaton Park Stadium	N/A	boxscore
3/03/1979	Newcastle Falcons	97–69	Brisbane Bullets	Newcastle Sports Entertainment Centre	N/A	boxscore
3/03/1979	West Adelaide Bearcats	73–66	Nunawading Spectres	Apollo Entertainment Centre	N/A	boxscore
4/03/1979	Bankstown Bruins	74–101	St. Kilda Saints	Bankstown Basketball Stadium	N/A	boxscore
4/03/1979	Newcastle Falcons	83-81	City of Sydney Astronauts	Newcastle Sports Entertainment Centre	N/A	boxscore
4/03/1979	Illawarra Hawks	74–78	Canberra Cannons	Beaton Park Stadium	N/A	boxscore
4/03/1979	Glenelg Tigers	68–74	Nunawading Spectres	Apollo Entertainment Centre	N/A	boxscore

=== Round 3 ===
Date	Home	Score	Away	Venue	Crowd	Box Score
10/03/1979	Canberra Cannons	75–65	West Adelaide Bearcats	Canberra Showgrounds	N/A	boxscore
10/03/1979	Illawarra Hawks	74–71	Bankstown Bruins	Beaton Park Stadium	N/A	boxscore
10/03/1979	Newcastle Falcons	99–87	Glenelg Tigers	Newcastle Sports Entertainment Centre	N/A	boxscore
11/03/1979	Nunawading Spectres	75–72	St. Kilda Saints	Burwood Stadium	N/A	boxscore
11/03/1979	City of Sydney Astronauts	81–80	Glenelg Tigers	Alexandria Stadium	N/A	boxscore
11/03/1979	Brisbane Bullets	68–78	West Adelaide Bearcats	Auchenflower Stadium	N/A	boxscore

=== Round 4 ===
Date	Home	Score	Away	Venue	Crowd	Box Score
17/03/1979	Bankstown Bruins	62–78	Brisbane Bullets	Bankstown Basketball Stadium	N/A	boxscore
17/03/1979	West Adelaide Bearcats	68–65	St. Kilda Saints	Apollo Entertainment Centre	N/A	boxscore
17/03/1979	Canberra Cannons	70–77	Illawarra Hawks	Canberra Showgrounds	N/A	boxscore
17/03/1979	Newcastle Falcons	79–82	Nunawading Spectres	Newcastle Sports Entertainment Centre	N/A	boxscore
18/03/1979	City of Sydney Astronauts	107–81	Nunawading Spectres	Alexandria Stadium	N/A	boxscore
18/03/1979	Illawarra Hawks	101–77	Brisbane Bullets	Beaton Park Stadium	N/A	boxscore
18/03/1979	Glenelg Tigers	73–87	St. Kilda Saints	Apollo Entertainment Centre	N/A	boxscore

=== Round 5 ===
Date	Home	Score	Away	Venue	Crowd	Box Score
24/03/1979	Glenelg Tigers	64–73	Bankstown Bruins	Apollo Entertainment Centre	N/A	boxscore
24/03/1979	St. Kilda Saints	88–70	Canberra Cannons	Albert Park Basketball Stadium	N/A	boxscore
24/03/1979	Newcastle Falcons	79–77	Illawarra Hawks	Newcastle Sports Entertainment Centre	N/A	boxscore
25/03/1979	City of Sydney Astronauts	92–82	Illawarra Hawks	Alexandria Stadium	N/A	boxscore
25/03/1979	Nunawading Spectres	71–59	Canberra Cannons	Burwood Stadium	N/A	boxscore
25/03/1979	West Adelaide Bearcats	91–88	Bankstown Bruins	Apollo Entertainment Centre	N/A	boxscore
31/03/1979	Illawarra Hawks	72–91	West Adelaide Bearcats	Beaton Park Stadium	N/A	boxscore

=== Round 6 ===
Date	Home	Score	Away	Venue	Crowd	Box Score
31/03/1979	Canberra Cannons	86–80	Brisbane Bullets	Canberra Showgrounds	N/A	boxscore
31/03/1979	City of Sydney Astronauts	90–76	Bankstown Bruins	Albert Park Basketball Stadium	N/A	boxscore
31/03/1979	St. Kilda Saints	86–54	Glenelg Tigers	Albert Park Basketball Stadium	N/A	boxscore
1/04/1979	Nunawading Spectres	77–53	Glenelg Tigers	Burwood Stadium	N/A	boxscore
1/04/1979	City of Sydney Astronauts	107–95	Brisbane Bullets	Alexandria Stadium	N/A	boxscore
1/04/1979	Bankstown Bruins	70–92	West Adelaide Bearcats	Bankstown Basketball Stadium	N/A	boxscore

=== Round 7 ===
Date	Home	Score	Away	Venue	Crowd	Box Score
7/04/1979	Glenelg Tigers	75–77	West Adelaide Bearcats	Apollo Entertainment Centre	N/A	boxscore
7/04/1979	Brisbane Bullets	101–86	Bankstown Bruins	Auchenflower Stadium	N/A	boxscore
7/04/1979	Canberra Cannons	76–83	City of Sydney Astronauts	Canberra Showgrounds	N/A	boxscore
7/04/1979	Nunawading Spectres	77–47	Illawarra Hawks	Burwood Stadium	N/A	boxscore
8/04/1979	St. Kilda Saints	89–81	Illawarra Hawks	Albert Park Basketball Stadium	N/A	boxscore
8/04/1979	Brisbane Bullets	99–80	Newcastle Falcons	Auchenflower Stadium	N/A	boxscore

=== Round 8 ===
Date	Home	Score	Away	Venue	Crowd	Box Score
19/04/1979	Glenelg Tigers	71–80	Canberra Cannons	Apollo Entertainment Centre	N/A	boxscore

=== Round 9 ===
Date	Home	Score	Away	Venue	Crowd	Box Score
21/04/1979	St. Kilda Saints	107–86	Bankstown Bruins	Albert Park Basketball Stadium	N/A	boxscore
22/04/1979	Nunawading Spectres	93–81	Bankstown Bruins	Burwood Stadium	N/A	boxscore
22/04/1979	West Adelaide Bearcats	64–65	Canberra Cannons	Apollo Entertainment Centre	N/A	boxscore

=== Round 10 ===
Date	Home	Score	Away	Venue	Crowd	Box Score
28/04/1979	Newcastle Falcons	94–89	West Adelaide Bearcats	Newcastle Sports Entertainment Centre	N/A	boxscore
28/04/1979	Bankstown Bruins	91–86	Illawarra Hawks	Bankstown Basketball Stadium	N/A	boxscore
28/04/1979	St. Kilda Saints	95–76	Nunawading Spectres	Albert Park Basketball Stadium	N/A	boxscore
28/04/1979	Brisbane Bullets	91–74	Glenelg Tigers	Auchenflower Stadium	N/A	boxscore
29/04/1979	Illawarra Hawks	90–100	City of Sydney Astronauts	Beaton Park Stadium	N/A	boxscore
29/04/1979	City of Sydney Astronauts	86–84	West Adelaide Bearcats	Alexandria Stadium	N/A	boxscore
29/04/1979	Canberra Cannons	80–75	Glenelg Tigers	Canberra Showgrounds	N/A	boxscore

=== Round 11 ===
Date	Home	Score	Away	Venue	Crowd	Box Score
5/05/1979	Newcastle Falcons	96–103	Bankstown Bruins	Newcastle Sports Entertainment Centre	N/A	boxscore
5/05/1979	St. Kilda Saints	117–92	Brisbane Bullets	Albert Park Basketball Stadium	N/A	boxscore
6/05/1979	Canberra Cannons	94–85	Newcastle Falcons	Canberra Showgrounds	N/A	boxscore
6/05/1979	Nunawading Spectres	84–97	Brisbane Bullets	Burwood Stadium	N/A	boxscore

=== Round 12 ===
Date	Home	Score	Away	Venue	Crowd	Box Score
12/05/1979	Illawarra Hawks	110–83	Glenelg Tigers	Beaton Park Stadium	N/A	boxscore
12/05/1979	Nunawading Spectres	72–58	West Adelaide Bearcats	Burwood Stadium	N/A	boxscore
12/05/1979	Newcastle Falcons	84–77	Canberra Cannons	Newcastle Sports Entertainment Centre	N/A	boxscore
13/05/1979	City of Sydney Astronauts	99–119	Newcastle Falcons	Alexandria Stadium	N/A	boxscore
13/05/1979	Bankstown Bruins	84–100	Glenelg Tigers	Bankstown Basketball Stadium	N/A	boxscore
13/05/1979	St. Kilda Saints	92–85	West Adelaide Bearcats	Albert Park Basketball Stadium	N/A	boxscore
13/05/1979	Brisbane Bullets	91–85	Illawarra Hawks	Auchenflower Stadium	N/A	boxscore

=== Round 13 ===
Date	Home	Score	Away	Venue	Crowd	Box Score
19/05/1979	West Adelaide Bearcats	108–85	Newcastle Falcons	Apollo Entertainment Centre	N/A	boxscore
19/05/1979	Glenelg Tigers	68–74	Illawarra Hawks	Apollo Entertainment Centre	N/A	boxscore
19/05/1979	City of Sydney Astronauts	78–103	St. Kilda Saints	Alexandria Stadium	N/A	boxscore
19/05/1979	Brisbane Bullets	105–85	Nunawading Spectres	Auchenflower Stadium	N/A	boxscore
20/05/1979	Brisbane Bullets	81–98	St. Kilda Saints	Auchenflower Stadium	N/A	boxscore
20/05/1979	Canberra Cannons	84–70	Nunawading Spectres	Canberra Showgrounds	N/A	boxscore
20/05/1979	Bankstown Bruins	83–87	City of Sydney Astronauts	Bankstown Basketball Stadium	N/A	boxscore
20/05/1979	West Adelaide Bearcats	74–71	Illawarra Hawks	Apollo Entertainment Centre	N/A	boxscore
20/05/1979	Glenelg Tigers	79–77	Newcastle Falcons	Apollo Entertainment Centre	N/A	boxscore

=== Round 14 ===
Date	Home	Score	Away	Venue	Crowd	Box Score
26/05/1979	Newcastle Falcons	79–92	St. Kilda Saints	Newcastle Sports Entertainment Centre	N/A	boxscore
26/05/1979	Bankstown Bruins	92–93	Nunawading Spectres	Bankstown Basketball Stadium	N/A	boxscore
26/05/1979	West Adelaide Bearcats	97–76	Glenelg Tigers	Apollo Entertainment Centre	N/A	boxscore
26/05/1979	Brisbane Bullets	104–88	City of Sydney Astronauts	Auchenflower Stadium	N/A	boxscore
27/05/1979	Illawarra Hawks	84–93	Nunawading Spectres	Beaton Park Stadium	N/A	boxscore
27/05/1979	Canberra Cannons	93–98	St. Kilda Saints	Canberra Showgrounds	N/A	boxscore

=== Round 15 ===
Date	Home	Score	Away	Venue	Crowd	Box Score
2/06/1979	Illawarra Hawks	81–80	Newcastle Falcons	Beaton Park Stadium	N/A	boxscore
2/06/1979	Canberra Cannons	101–86	Bankstown Bruins	Canberra Showgrounds	N/A	boxscore
2/06/1979	Nunawading Spectres	81–61	City of Sydney Astronauts	Burwood Stadium	N/A	boxscore
2/06/1979	West Adelaide Bearcats	120–93	Brisbane Bullets	Apollo Entertainment Centre	N/A	boxscore
3/06/1979	St. Kilda Saints	97–86	City of Sydney Astronauts	Albert Park Basketball Stadium	N/A	boxscore
3/06/1979	Bankstown Bruins	84–93	Newcastle Falcons	Bankstown Basketball Stadium	N/A	boxscore
3/06/1979	Glenelg Tigers	92–112	Brisbane Bullets	Apollo Entertainment Centre	N/A	boxscore

== Ladder ==
Pos	1979 NBL season											
Pos	Team	Pld	W	L	PCT	Last 5	Streak	Home	Away	PF	PA	PP
1	St. Kilda Saints	18	15	3	83.33%	5–0	W13	9–0	6–3	1689	1431	118.03%
2	Canberra Cannons^{1}	18	13	5	72.22%	3–2	W1	7–2	6–3	1448	1398	103.58%
3	Nunawading Spectres^{1}	18	13	5	72.22%	3–2	W3	8–1	5–4	1439	1349	106.67%
4	West Adelaide Bearcats	18	12	6	66.67%	4–1	W4	8–1	4–5	1523	1397	109.02%
5	Brisbane Bullets	18	10	8	55.56%	3–2	W1	6–3	4–5	1628	1625	100.18%
6	Newcastle Falcons^{2}	18	8	10	44.44%	1-4	W1	6–3	2–7	1550	1582	97.98%
7	City of Sydney Astronauts^{2}	18	8	10	44.44%	1–4	L3	5–4	3–6	1528	1609	94.97%
8	Illawarra Hawks	18	5	13	27.78%	2–3	W1	4–5	1–8	1442	1521	94.81%
9	Glenelg Tigers^{3}	18	3	15	16.67%	2–3	L2	2–7	1–8	1340	1524	87.93%
10	Bankstown Bruins^{3}	18	3	15	16.67%	0–5	L5	1–8	2–7	1484	1635	90.76%

Updated to match(es) played on 3 June 1979. Source: NBL.com.au

The NBL tie-breaker system as outlined in the NBL Rules and Regulations states that in the case of an identical win–loss record, the results in games played between the teams will determine order of seeding.

^{1}Head-to-Head between Canberra Cannons and Nunawading Spectres (1-1). Canberra Cannons won For and Against (+2).

^{2}Newcastle Falcons won Head-to-Head (2-0).

^{3}Head-to-Head between Glenelg Tigers and Bankstown Bruins (1-1). Glenelg Tigers won For and Against (+7).

== Grand Final ==
Date	Home	Score	Away	Venue	Crowd	Box Score
10/06/1979	St. Kilda Saints	94–93	Canberra Cannons	Albert Park Basketball Stadium	N/A	boxscore

== Coaches ==
Coach	Team	Games Coached	Won	Lost	Win%	Comments
Brian Kerle	St. Kilda Saints	19	16	3	84.21%	1979 Championship Coach (1st title)
Cal Stamp	Canberra Cannons	19	13	6	68.42%	
Barry Barnes	Nunawading Spectres	18	13	5	72.22%	
Ken Richardson	West Adelaide Bearcats	18	12	6	66.67%	
Robert Young	Brisbane Bullets	18	10	8	55.56%	
Bob Turner	Newcastle Falcons	18	8	10	44.44%	
Charlie Ammit	City of Sydney Astronauts	18	8	10	44.44%	
Joe Farrugia	Illawarra Hawks	18	5	13	27.78%	
Alan Dawe	Glenelg Tigers	18	3	15	16.67%	
Shaun O'Connell	Bankstown Bruins	18	3	15	16.67%	

== Awards ==
=== Statistics leaders ===
Category	Player	Team	Stat
Points	Cal Bruton	Brisbane Bullets	597 pts / 18 games
Free throw percentage	Robbie Cadee	St. Kilda Saints	89.7% (35/39)

=== Regular season ===
- Most Valuable Player: Ken Richardson (West Adelaide Bearcats)

=== Grand Final ===
- Grand Final MVP: Larry Sengstock (St. Kilda Saints)
