= Jim Slacke =

American basketball player

Personal information
- Born: 1953 (age 72–73)
- Listed height: 198 cm (6 ft 6 in)

Career information
- College: Chico State (1972–1973)
- Playing career: 1979–1985
- Position: Forward
- Number: 12

Career history
- 1979–1985: Illawarra Hawks

Career highlights
- NBL Free Throw Percentage leader (1980)

Jim Slacke (born c. 1953) is an American former professional basketball player who played seven seasons in the Australian National Basketball League (NBL) for the Illawarra Hawks.

After playing college basketball for the Chico State Wildcats in 1972–73, Slacke moved to Australia where he joined the Illawarra Hawks and played in the New South Wales Men's Division 1 basketball competition. The Hawks were preseason favourites for the 1977 Championship behind Slacke and Gordie McLeod.

In 1979, the Hawks were founding members of the Australian NBL. Slacke was part of the inaugural team and averaged a career-best 23.8 points per game in his first season. In seven seasons with the Hawks, he played 143 games and averaged 17.5 points per game. Slacke was one of the NBL's all-time best free throw shooters with an 86 per cent clip for his career. He led the NBL in Free Throw Percentage in 1980 with 87.2% (68/78).

In January 2018, Slacke was named one of the 12 Greatest Hawks of All Time by the Illawarra Mercury.
