= Ray Wood (basketball) =

Australian basketball player

Personal information
- Listed height: 178 cm (5 ft 10 in)

Career information
- Playing career: 1979–1987
- Position: Guard

Career history

Playing
- 1979–1984: West Adelaide Bearcats
- 1985–1987: Adelaide 36ers

Coaching
- 1991: Woodville Warriors

Career highlights
- 2× NBL champion (1982, 1986); 2× NBL Best Defensive Player (1980, 1981); 6× SA State League champion

Ray Wood is an Australian former professional basketball player and coach. He played in the National Basketball League (NBL) for the West Adelaide Bearcats and Adelaide 36ers. Wood won two NBL championships in 1982 and 1986 and was a two-time NBL Best Defensive Player.

== Basketball career ==
Wood was a product of the West Adelaide Bearcats' junior program. He was chosen as the NBL Best Defensive Player in 1980 and 1981. Wood was the starting point guard for the Bearcats when they won the NBL championship in 1982. Wood was acquired by the Adelaide 36ers in 1985 when they merged with the Bearcats in the NBL. He won a second championship with the 36ers in 1986.

Wood also played for the Bearcats at the state level and won six SA State League championships during his 500-game career. He was inducted in the West Adelaide Bearcats Hall of Fame.

Wood was head coach for the Woodville Warriors of the South East Australian Basketball League in 1991.

Wood lives in Adelaide.
