= Ray Borner =

Australian basketball player

Ballarat Miners
- Title: Head coach
- League: NBL1 South

Personal information
- Born: 27 May 1962 (age 64) Ballarat, Victoria, Australia
- Listed height: 208 cm (6 ft 10 in)
- Listed weight: 115 kg (254 lb)

Career information
- College: LSU (1981–1982)
- Playing career: 1980–2003
- Position: Centre
- Coaching career: 2001–2003; 2026–

Career history

Playing
- 1980–1985: Coburg Giants
- 1986–1988: Illawarra Hawks
- 1989–1992: North Melbourne Giants
- 1993–1994: Geelong Supercats
- 1995–2000: Canberra Cannons
- 2001: Wollongong Hawks
- 2001–2003: Ballarat Miners

Coaching
- 2001–2003: Ballarat Miners
- 2026–present: Ballarat Miners

Career highlights
- NBL champion (1989); NBL Most Valuable Player (1985); All-NBL First Team (1985); All-NBL Third Team (1995); NBL Hall of Fame member

Raymond Helmut Borner OAM (born 27 May 1962) is an Australian basketball coach and former player who is currently the head coach of the Ballarat Miners of the NBL1 South. He played 22 seasons in the National Basketball League (NBL), earning the NBL Most Valuable Player Award in 1985 and winning an NBL championship in 1989, both as a member of the Coburg / North Melbourne Giants. He also played for the Illawarra/Wollongong Hawks, Geelong Supercats and Canberra Cannons.

== Playing career ==
=== NBL ===
Borner debuted in the NBL in 1980 for the Coburg Giants. In 1985, he was named the NBL Most Valuable Player, becoming the first Australian-born league MVP. After six seasons for Coburg, he joined the Illawarra Hawks in 1986. After three seasons for the Hawks, he joined the North Melbourne Giants in 1989 and won his first and only NBL championship that year. He played four seasons for North Melbourne before joining the Geelong Supercats in 1993. After two seasons for the Supercats, he joined the Canberra Cannons, where he spent six seasons between 1995 and 1999–2000. He had one final stint during the 2000–01 NBL season, playing two games for the Wollongong Hawks in January 2001. He played in the NBL All-Star Game every year between 1991 and 1995.

Borner finished his NBL career with 518 games over 22 seasons. He was inducted into the NBL Hall of Fame in 2006.

The Ray Borner Medal is a medal awarded during the NBL's annual Pre-season Blitz tournament. In 2013, the award was reinstated for the first time since 2004. It had previously been awarded for the best player in the Blitz final, but with its reinstatement in 2013, it became the Blitz tournament MVP award. The award remains active as of 2025.

=== College ===
Following the 1981 NBL season, Borner moved to the United States to play a season of college basketball for the LSU Tigers. In 25 games during the 1981–82 season, he made 10 starts and averaged 2.0 points and 1.9 rebounds in 9.6 minutes per game.

=== National team ===
Borner competed for the Australian national team in four Summer Olympic Games: 1984 in Los Angeles, 1988 in Seoul, 1992 in Barcelona, and 1996 in Atlanta. He also played for the Boomers at the 1982, 1986, 1990 and 1994 FIBA World Championships. He played 242 international senior games for Australia.

=== SEABL ===
Between 2001 and 2003, Borner served as player-coach of the Ballarat Miners in the South East Australian Basketball League (SEABL). He helped the Miners win the SEABL South Conference championship in 2001.

== Coaching career ==
In January 2026, Borner returned to the Ballarat Miners, now in the NBL1 South, to serve as men's head coach for the 2026 NBL1 season.

== Personal life ==
Borner was awarded the Order of Australia medal as part of the 2009 Australia Day Honours.
