= Al Green (basketball) =

American-Australian basketball player

Personal information
- Born: 3 September 1953 (age 73) New York City, New York, U.S.
- Listed height: 6 ft 2 in (1.88 m)
- Listed weight: 172 lb (78 kg)

Career information
- High school: Maine Central Institute (Pittsfield, Maine)
- College: Arizona Western (1974–1975); NC State (1975–1977); LSU (1978–1979)
- NBA draft: 1979: 3rd round, 64th overall pick
- Drafted by: Phoenix Suns
- Playing career: 1979–1993
- Position: Point guard / shooting guard
- Number: 15, 10
- Coaching career: 2011–present

Career history

Playing
- 1979–1980: Utica Olympics
- 1980–1981: Atlantic City Hi-Rollers
- 1981–1984: West Adelaide Bearcats
- 1981: Crispa Redmanizers
- 1985: North Adelaide Rockets
- 1985–1990: Adelaide 36ers
- 1991–1993: Newcastle Falcons

Coaching
- 2011–2014: Woodville Warriors
- 2014: Forestville Eagles (assistant)
- 2016–2017: South Adelaide Panthers

Career highlights
- 2× NBL champion (1982, 1986); NBL Most Valuable Player (1982); 2× All-NBL First Team (1981, 1985); NBL scoring champion (1984); No. 15 retired by Adelaide 36ers; PBA Reinforced champion (1981); AP Honorable Mention All-American (1979); Third-team Parade All-American (1974)
- Stats at Basketball Reference

Alan Carwell Green (born 3 September 1953) is an American-Australian former professional basketball player. He played college basketball for three different colleges and was drafted by the Phoenix Suns in 1979. He arrived in Australia in 1981 and had a successful career in the National Basketball League (NBL) until his retirement in 1993. He won two NBL championships in 1982 and 1986, and was the NBL Most Valuable Player in 1982.

== Early life and college ==
Green was born in New York City and grew up in South Bronx. He attended Maine Central Institute in Pittsfield, Maine, where he was a third-team Parade All-American selection in 1974.

Green began his college basketball career at Arizona Western College before playing two seasons for the NC State Wolfpack between 1975 and 1977. After redshirting the 1977–78 season, he played his final college season in 1978–79 for the LSU Tigers.

== Professional career ==
=== NFL and NBA drafts ===
Coming out of college, Green was selected by the San Diego Chargers in May 1979 in the NFL draft as pick #269 as a defensive back despite never having played organised football. The choice was made primarily on Green's size, speed and jumping ability. Green and his agent spoke to the Chargers but despite the money he was being offered to change sports, he decided that he wanted to continue playing basketball.

The following month, Green was selected by the Phoenix Suns in the third round of the 1979 NBA draft with the 64th overall pick. He spent the 1979 preseason with the Suns but never debuted in the NBA.

=== CBA (1979–1981) ===
Green's first professional stint came during the 1979–80 season with the Utica Olympics of the Continental Basketball Association (CBA). He continued in the CBA with the Atlantic City Hi-Rollers for the 1980–81 season.

=== NBL (1981–1993) ===
In early 1981, Green moved to Australia to play for the West Adelaide Bearcats in the National Basketball League (NBL). He earned All-NBL First Team in his first season. Following the NBL season, he moved to the Philippines where he helped the Crispa Redmanizers win the 1981 PBA Reinforced Filipino Conference.

Green returned to the Bearcats in 1982 and won the NBL Most Valuable Player Award. He helped the Bearcats reach the 1982 NBL Grand Final, where they defeated the Geelong Supercats to win the NBL championship.

Green continued on with the Bearcats in 1983 and 1984. In 1984, he scored 50 or more points four times, including a 71-point game. He subsequently earned the 1984 scoring title. The all-time NBL individual scoring record as of December 2024 remains Green's 71 for West Adelaide against Frankston – during a month in which he averaged 51 points, and in a season where he averaged 39.5 points per game.

Green played for the North Adelaide Rockets of the SA State League in 1985, the same year he joined the Adelaide 36ers for the 1985 NBL season. He helped the 36ers reach the NBL Grand Final, where they lost to the Brisbane Bullets. He earned All-NBL First Team honours. In 1986, he helped the 36ers return to the grand final and won his second NBL championship, with the 36ers this time defeating the Bullets. He parted ways with the 36ers after the 1990 NBL season.

Between 1991 and 1993, Green played for the Newcastle Falcons. He retired from the NBL in 1993 having played 340 games. He finished with career averages of 22.1 points, 4.2 rebounds, 3.0 assists and 1.0 steals per game.

== Coaching career ==
In 2011, Green was appointed head coach of the Woodville Warriors men's team in the Central ABL. He served in that role until being sacked early in the 2014 season. He immediately joined the Forestville Eagles as an assistant coach.

In 2016 and 2017, Green served as coach of the South Adelaide Panthers.

== Athletics ==
Green was also a professional runner who won Adelaide's famous Bay Sheffield sprint race held over 120 metres in both 1983 and 1984. During 1985, after he became a naturalised Australian, Green announced his retirement from professional running with the intention of running for Australia at the 1986 Commonwealth Games although he did not end up making the team.

== Personal life ==
As of 2016, Green lives in Adelaide and works as a U.S. basketball tour guide.

== NBL career stats ==
Legend
GP	Games played	GS	Games started	MPG	Minutes per game
FG%	Field goal percentage	3P%	3-point field goal percentage	FT%	Free throw percentage
RPG	Rebounds per game	APG	Assists per game	SPG	Steals per game
BPG	Blocks per game	PPG	Points per game	**Bold**	Career high

†	Denotes season(s) in which Green won an NBL championship

Year	Team	GP	GS	MPG	FG%	3P%	FT%	RPG	APG	SPG	BPG	PPG
1981	West Adelaide Bearcats	23	23	NA	.500	NA	.733	NA	NA	NA	NA	26.0
1982†	West Adelaide Bearcats	28	28	NA	.587	NA	.743	4.7	2.4	NA	0.0	26.5
1983	West Adelaide Bearcats	26	26	NA	.567	NA	.763	3.7	2.3	1.0	0.2	29.6
1984	West Adelaide Bearcats	21	21	NA	.523	.349	.760	**6.4**	5.0	**1.9**	0.3	**39.5**
1985	Adelaide 36ers	28	28	NA	.541	.366	.793	6.0	**5.1**	1.3	0.3	31.0
1986†	Adelaide 36ers	**30**	**30**	NA	.505	.389	.689	4.5	3.5	1.1	0.5	19.4
1987	Adelaide 36ers	29	29	41.0	.537	.368	.720	5.0	3.2	0.8	0.4	23.1
1988	Adelaide 36ers	26	26	36.3	.542	.325	.728	3.9	3.9	1.4	**0.6**	20.0
1989	Adelaide 36ers	25	25	37.7	.528	.366	.783	3.5	3.8	1.2	0.2	14.7
1990	Adelaide 36ers	26	NA	22.5	.505	.400	.750	2.1	2.2	0.9	0.3	9.8
1991	Newcastle Falcons	26	26	**41.1**	.533	.383	.702	5.1	2.1	1.0	0.2	22.2
1992	Newcastle Falcons	24	24	34.4	**.548**	**.414**	**.805**	5.8	3.0	1.1	0.4	18.9
1993	Newcastle Falcons	28	28	32.0	.413	.310	.683	4.3	2.7	1.1	0.2	10.3
**Career**		340	NA	NA	.531	.364	.748	4.2	3.0	1.0	0.3	22.1
