= Rocky Smith =

American basketball player

Personal information
- Born: 24 October 1954 (age 72) Oroville, California, U.S.
- Listed height: 6 ft 2 in (1.88 m)
- Listed weight: 180 lb (82 kg)

Career information
- High school: Oroville (Oroville, California)
- College: Butte (1973–1975); Oregon State (1975–1977)
- NBA draft: 1977: 4th round, 84th overall pick
- Drafted by: Houston Rockets
- Playing career: 1977–1991
- Position: Shooting guard

Career history
- 1980–1981: St. Kilda Saints
- 1981–1982: C.A. Monte Líbano
- 1982–1983: Wyoming Wildcatters
- 1983–1987: S.C. Corinthians Paulista
- 1987–1988: Limeira
- 1988–1990: Flamengo
- 1990–1991: Franca

Career highlights
- NBL champion (1980); NBL Grand Final MVP (1980); NBL Most Valuable Player (1980); All-NBL Team (1981); NBL scoring champion (1980); 2× Brazilian Championship champion (1990, 1991); First-team All-Pac-8 (1977)
- Stats at Basketball Reference

Rocky Smith (born October 24, 1954) is an American retired professional basketball player.

== High school ==
Born in Oroville, California, Smith graduated from Oroville High School, where he played basketball, in 1973. He was an All-Star, all four years that he played for the Tigers.

== College career ==
Smith started his college basketball career at Butte Community College, where he played from 1973 to 1975. He then played college basketball at Oregon State University, with the Beavers, where he was named first-team All-Pac-8 Conference in 1977. Smith led the Beavers in scoring in his final two seasons.

== Professional career ==
After his college career, Smith was selected in the 4th round, number 84 overall, by the Houston Rockets, in the 1977 NBA draft. Smith went on to play professional basketball in Australia, where he played with the St. Kilda Saints in the National Basketball League. In 1980, he filled one of two import spots for St. Kilda alongside Mike Slusher. He was voted the NBL Most Valuable Player in 1980, and was also named the NBL Grand Final MVP in that same year. The following season, he was named to the All-NBL Team.

He also played one season in the Continental Basketball Association (CBA), with the Wyoming Wildcatters, in the 1982–83 season. During that season, he averaged 7.3 points per game.

Smith also played in Brazil, being the country's highest paid basketball player in the 80's. In Brazil, he played with some of the most traditional Brazilian basketball teams, such as: C.A. Monte Líbano, in the 1981–82 season, S.C. Corinthians Paulista, from 1983 until 1987, Limeira, in 1987–88, Flamengo, in 1988–90, and Franca, in 1990–91.
