= NBL Most Valuable Player Award =

Annual National Basketball League award

The National Basketball League Most Valuable Player (MVP) Award is an annual National Basketball League (NBL) award given since the league's inaugural season to the best performing player of the regular season. Since the 2005–06 season, winners receive the Andrew Gaze Trophy, named after the seven-time MVP.

As of the 2025–26 season, the MVP voting system sees the head coach and captain of each club, as well as a panel of experts, vote on a 5-4-3-2-1 basis. The votes are weighted equally between the combined head coaches, combined captains and the panel of experts. Coaches and captains cannot vote for players from their own clubs.

== Winners ==
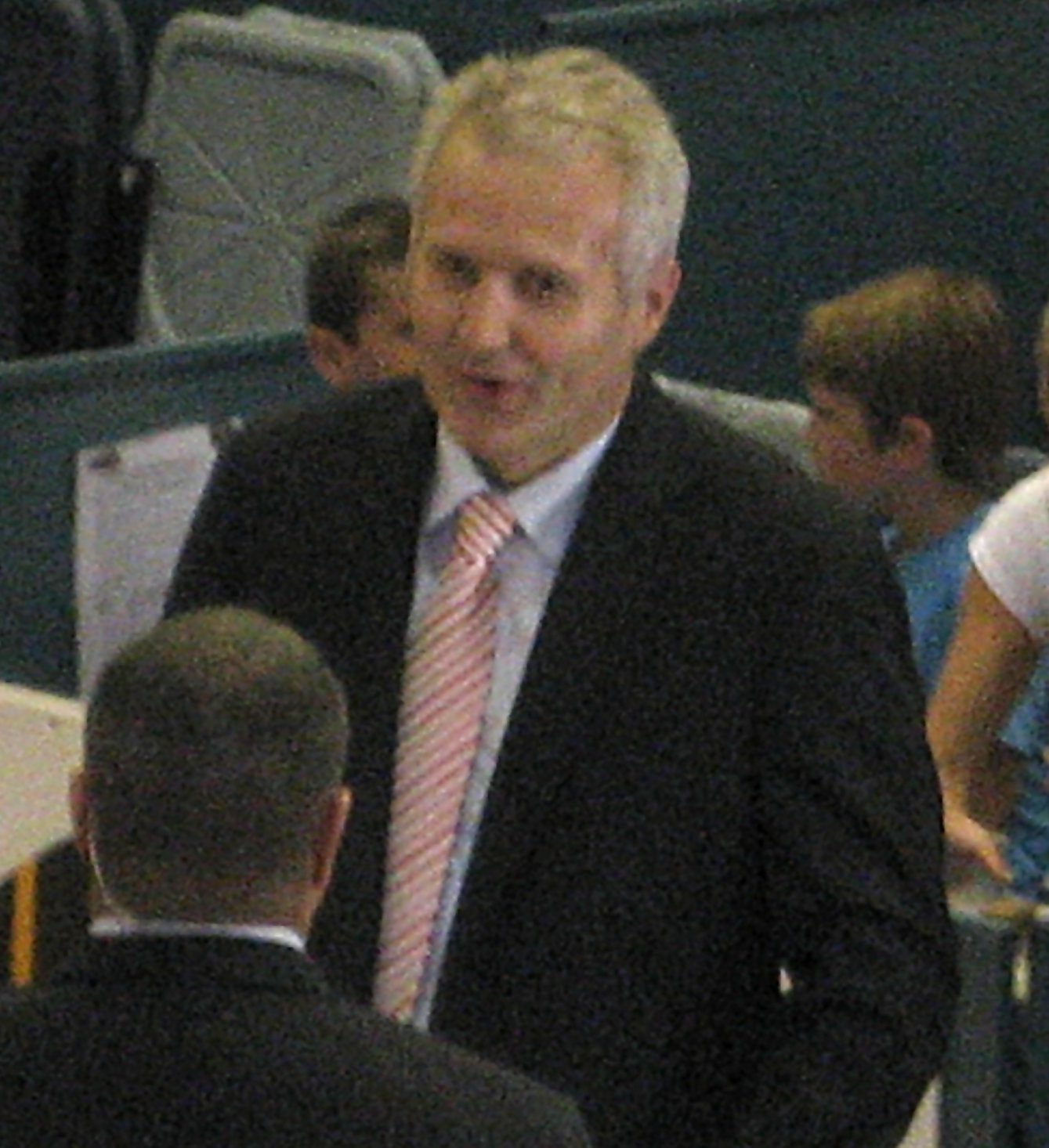
Andrew Gaze won the award seven times

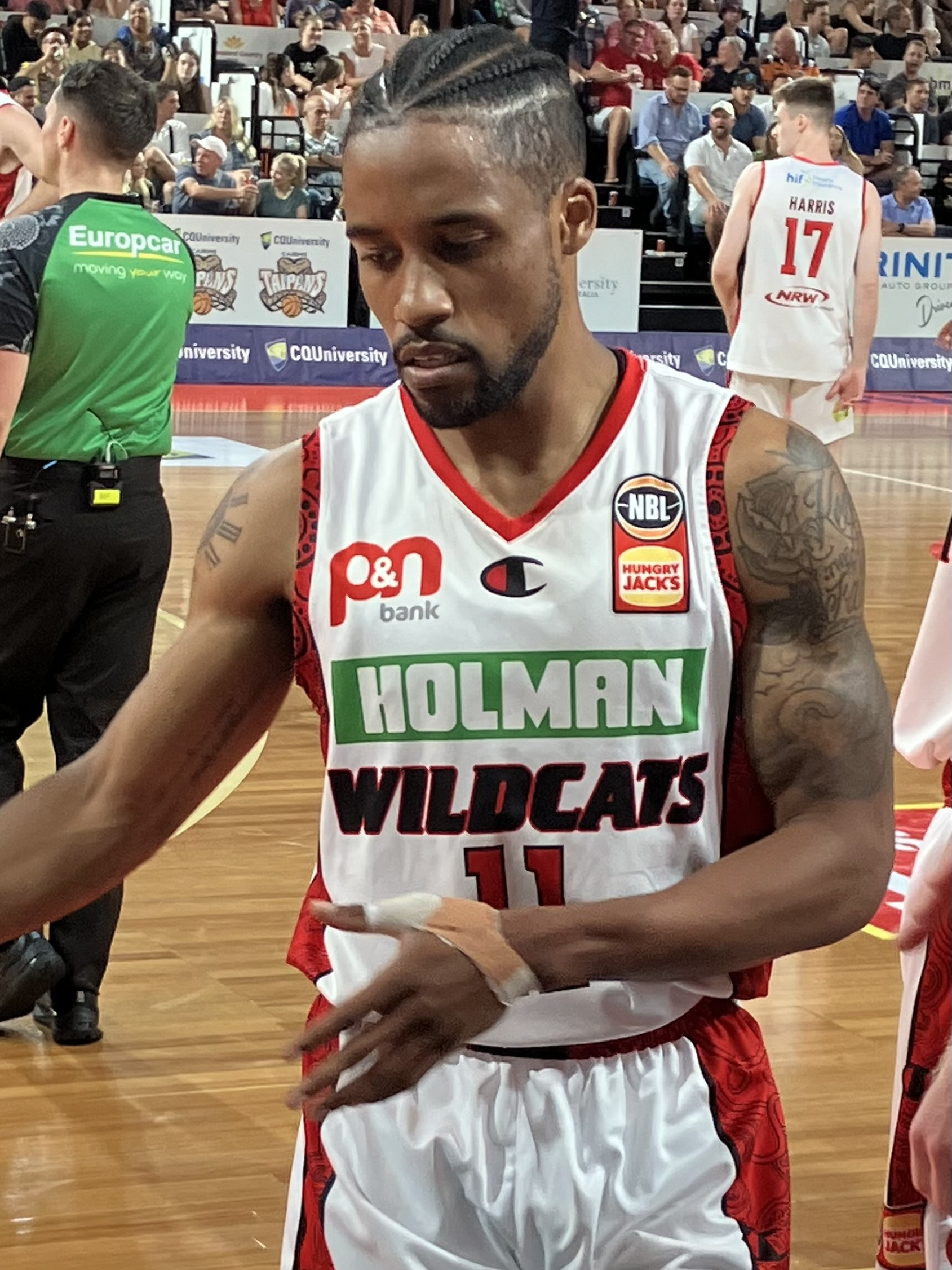
Bryce Cotton is a six-time winner of the award

Season	Player	Nationality	Team
1979	Ken Richardson	United States	West Adelaide Bearcats (1)
1980	Rocky Smith	United States	St. Kilda Saints (1)
1981	Mike Jones	United States	Illawarra Hawks (1)
1982	Al Green	United States	West Adelaide Bearcats (2)
1983	Owen Wells	United States	Sydney Supersonics (1)
1984	Leroy Loggins	United States	Brisbane Bullets (1)
1985	Ray Borner	Australia	Coburg Giants (1)
1986	Leroy Loggins (2)	United States	Brisbane Bullets (2)
1987	Mark Davis; Leroy Loggins (3)	United States; United States	Adelaide 36ers (1); Brisbane Bullets (3)
1988	Joe Hurst	United States	Hobart Devils (1)
1989	Scott Fisher	United States	North Melbourne Giants (1)
1990	Derek Rucker	United States	Brisbane Bullets (4)
1991	Andrew Gaze	Australia	Melbourne Tigers (1)
1992	Scott Fisher (2); Andrew Gaze (2)	United States; Australia	North Melbourne Giants (2); Melbourne Tigers (2)
1993	Robert Rose	United States	South East Melbourne Magic (1)
1994	Andrew Gaze (3)	Australia	Melbourne Tigers (3)
1995	Andrew Gaze (4)	Australia	Melbourne Tigers (4)
1996	Andrew Gaze (5)	Australia	Melbourne Tigers (5)
1997	Andrew Gaze (6)	Australia	Melbourne Tigers (6)
1998	Andrew Gaze (7)	Australia	Melbourne Tigers (7)
1998–99	Steve Woodberry	United States	Brisbane Bullets (5)
1999–2000	Paul Rodgers	Australia	Perth Wildcats (1)
2000–01	Robert Rose (2)	United States	Townsville Crocodiles (1)
2001–02	Mark Bradtke	Australia	Melbourne Tigers (8)
2002–03	Chris Williams	United States	Sydney Kings (1)
2003–04	Matthew Nielsen	Australia	Sydney Kings (2)
2004–05	Brian Wethers	United States	Hunter Pirates (1)
2005–06	Chris Anstey	Australia	Melbourne Tigers (9)
2006–07	Sam Mackinnon	Australia	Brisbane Bullets (6)
2007–08	Chris Anstey (2)	Australia	Melbourne Tigers (10)
2008–09	Kirk Penney	New Zealand	New Zealand Breakers (1)
2009–10	Corey Williams	United States	Townsville Crocodiles (2)
2010–11	Gary Ervin	United States	Wollongong Hawks (2)
2011–12	Kevin Lisch	United States	Perth Wildcats (2)
2012–13	Cedric Jackson	United States	New Zealand Breakers (2)
2013–14	Rotnei Clarke	United States	Wollongong Hawks (3)
2014–15	Brian Conklin	United States	Townsville Crocodiles (3)
2015–16	Kevin Lisch (2)	United States	Illawarra Hawks (4)
2016–17	Jerome Randle	United States	Adelaide 36ers (2)
2017–18	Bryce Cotton	United States	Perth Wildcats (3)
2018–19	Andrew Bogut	Australia	Sydney Kings (3)
2019–20	Bryce Cotton (2)	United States	Perth Wildcats (4)
2020–21	Bryce Cotton (3)	United States	Perth Wildcats (5)
2021–22	Jaylen Adams	United States	Sydney Kings (4)
2022–23	Xavier Cooks	Australia	Sydney Kings (5)
2023–24	Bryce Cotton (4)	United States	Perth Wildcats (6)
2024–25	Bryce Cotton (5)	United States	Perth Wildcats (7)
2025–26	Bryce Cotton (6)	Australia (Note: Cotton became an Australian citizen prior to the 2025–26 season.)	Adelaide 36ers (3)

== Multi-time winners ==
Rank	Player	Team(s)	Awards	Years
1	Andrew Gaze	Melbourne Tigers	7	1991, 1992, 1994, 1995, 1996, 1997, 1998
2	Bryce Cotton	Perth Wildcats, Adelaide 36ers	6	2018, 2020, 2021, 2024, 2025, 2026
3	Leroy Loggins	Brisbane Bullets	3	1984, 1986, 1987
4	Scott Fisher	North Melbourne Giants	2	1989, 1992
4	Robert Rose	South East Melbourne Magic, Townsville Crocodiles	2	1993, 2001
4	Chris Anstey	Melbourne Tigers	2	2006, 2008
4	Kevin Lisch	Perth Wildcats, Illawarra Hawks	2	2012, 2016

== See also ==
- List of National Basketball League (Australia) awards
