= Apollo Stadium =

Former multi-purpose hall in Richmond, Australia

Apollo Entertainment Centre
- Interactive map of Apollo Entertainment Centre
- Former names: Apollo Stadium (1969-84)
- Location: 41 Kingston Avenue, Richmond, South Australia
- Coordinates: 34°56′21″S 138°33′54″E
- Capacity: 1969-84: 4,000; 1985-92: 3,500; Basketball / Netball: 3,000

Construction
- Groundbreaking: 1968
- Opened: 1969
- Closed: 1991 (sports & entertainment)
- Demolished: 1997

Tenants
- Adelaide 36ers (NBL) (1982–1991); West Adelaide Bearcats (NBL) (1979–1984); Glenelg Tigers (NBL) (1979); West Torrens / Forestville Eagles (NBL) (1980–1981)

Apollo Stadium (officially called the Apollo Entertainment Centre) was a multi-purpose indoor arena located at 41 Kingston Avenue, Richmond, South Australia, just 5 minutes from the Adelaide city centre. The stadium had an original seating capacity of 4,000 until the early 1980s when the bench seats were replaced by individual plastic seats giving a reduced seating capacity of 3,000 and an overall capacity of just 3,500.

Opened in 1969, the stadium was named for the Apollo Moon landing of the same year.

During the mid-late 1980s, an increasing number of international music acts began to bypass Adelaide as Apollo was seen as too small. This led to the building of the new 12,000 capacity Adelaide Entertainment Centre which opened in 1991, and in 1992 the venue was superseded as the home of basketball and netball by the new 8,000 seat Clipsal Powerhouse. The building then became a church for a few years but was eventually sold and demolished, with the site subsequently being redeveloped for housing.

== Sports arena ==
Apollo Stadium was Adelaide's major basketball arena from 1969 until 1991, being the home court of National Basketball League teams the West Adelaide Bearcats (1979–84), Glenelg Tigers (1979), West Torrens / Forestville Eagles (1980–81) and Adelaide 36ers, who were the Adelaide City Eagles in their first year (1982–91).

The first ever NBL game was played at a half full Apollo Stadium on 24 February 1979 when the Glenelg Tigers defeated the City of Sydney Astronauts 68-65. Top scorer for the league's inaugural game was Sydney's David Leslie who went for 25 points on 11/22 shooting. For the Tigers, Rick Hodges led the way with 16 points on 7/14 shooting.

The Bearcats and 36ers were almost unbeatable at the venue, with the Bearcats winning the 1982 NBL championship during their time in the league (the Grand Final win over the Geelong Supercats was played in Newcastle). During the 1986 regular season, the 36ers were undefeated at home going 13-0. The only game they lost at Apollo all season was Game 2 of the Grand Final series when they suffered a shock 104-83 loss to the Brisbane Bullets. The 36ers won their first NBL Championship at Apollo two days after their Game 2 loss when they accounted for the Bullets 113-91 in Game 3 in what was coach Ken Cole's last game in charge of the club.

As of the 2016-17 NBL season, no team has equalled Adelaide's 1986 NBL record of being undefeated at home during the regular season.

The stadium hosted the 1981 NBL Grand Final when the Launceston Casino City defeated the Nunawading Spectres as well as the 1982 NBL All-Star Game with the East team defeating the West 153-148 in a high scoring game.

Despite its low spectator capacity Apollo Stadium was known as one of the loudest venues in the NBL during its use from 1979 until 1991. With a capacity crowd of 3,000 sitting very close to the action it was an intimidating task for opposition teams with 36ers players often referring to Apollo as the teams "6th Man". Award winning Adelaide based basketball journalist Boti Nagy, who also often doubled as a sideline television commentator during 36ers games, often described the seating at Apollo as being so close to the action that you could literally get hit with sweat from the players as they ran past.

The final NBL game at Apollo was the first game of the 1991 Semi-final series between the 36ers and the defending champion Perth Wildcats. In front of yet another sellout crowd, the Wildcats defeated Adelaide 102-99. Playing for the 36ers in that game were Mark Davis, Darryl Pearce, Mark Bradtke, Butch Hays, Brett Wheeler and Mike McKay. For the Wildcats there was James Crawford, Kendall "Tiny" Pinder, Mike Ellis, Ricky Grace and Andrew Vlahov.

During the 1970s and 1980s, Apollo also hosted numerous international basketball games with touring teams such as Croatia and the powerful Soviet Union playing local sides as well as the Australian Boomers, as well as hosting games by various college basketball teams that toured Australia. The stadium also hosted a number of games featuring the Australian Opals.

Apollo Stadium was the home of the State League Netball grand final (usually televised locally by Channel 9) as well as being host to international and national state netball games until the Powerhouse opened in 1992.

Apollo Stadium also hosted other indoor sports such as volleyball and badminton and the venue was generally seen as the indoor home of South Australian teams in national competitions or tournaments.

== Music venue ==
Apollo Stadium was a significant music venue in South Australia. Among the rock bands and musicians who performed at the stadium were:

Artist(s)	Date(s)	Notes
Louis Armstrong		
The Kinks	4 Jun 1971	
Jerry Lee Lewis	Oct 1971	
Creedence Clearwater Revival	18 Feb 1972	
Jethro Tull	8 Jul 1972	
Black Sabbath	19 Jan 1973	
The Jackson 5	30 Jun 1973	
Santana	28 July 1973	
Santana	29 July 1973	
Status Quo	4 Sep 1973	In total, Status Quo played at Apollo 6 times.
Status Quo	14 Nov 1974	
Status Quo	15 Oct 1975	
Status Quo	6 Aug 1978 to 8th	
Little Richard	16 Jan 1974	
Paul McCartney & Wings	4 Nov 1975- 5 Nov 1975	
Queen	14 Apr 1976-15 Apr 1976	with Cold Chisel and The Ray Burton Band
AC/DC	4 Dec 1976	
AC/DC	12 Feb 1977	
10CC	20 Sep 1977-21 Sep 1977	
Elvis Costello and The Attractions	12 Dec 1978	
Talking Heads	13 June 1979	
Bob Marley and the Wailers	20 Apr 1979-21 Apr 1979	
Thin Lizzy	16 Oct 1980	
Cold Chisel	27 Feb 1981	
Cold Chisel	20 Oct 1983-23 Oct 1983	
U2	20 Sep 1984-21 Sept 1984	
The Easybeats	1986	
Midnight Oil	6 Oct 1987-8 Oct 1987	
Joe Cocker		
Bob Dylan		
The Police	17 Mar 1980	
Ike and Tina Turner		
B.B. King		
Yes	21 Mar 1973	
Deep Purple	8 May 1971	with Free and Manfred Mann
Supertramp		
Cat Stevens	8 Sep 1972 and 9th	
Adam and the Ants		
The Jackson 5	30 Jun 1973	
Bob Marley and the Wailers	20 Apr 1979-21 Apr 1979	
INXS	29 Sep 1986 and 30th	
The Stranglers	15 May 1985	
Boomtown Rats	6 Jun 1980 and 7th	
Blondie	30 Nov 1977	
Lou Reed	5 Nov 1977	
Frank Zappa	4 Jul 1973	
Frank Zappa	24 Jan 1976 and 25th	
T. Rex	6 Nov 1973	
The Beach Boys	25 Apr 1970	
