= Launceston Casino City =

Defunct Australian basketball team

- Nickname: Tigers
- Leagues: NBL
- Founded: 1980
- Dissolved: 1982
- History: Launceston Casino City; 1980–1982
- Arena: Dowling Street Stadium
- Location: Launceston, Tasmania
- Team colors: Yellow, red, dark green
- Championships: 1 (1981)

Launceston Casino City was an Australian professional basketball team that competed in the National Basketball League (NBL). Formed in 1980, the club was based in Launceston, Tasmania. It lasted only three seasons before folding, but won the NBL championship in 1981.

== History ==
Launceston Casino City entered the NBL in the 1980 season with a grant from the Tasmanian Government and the support of the developers of the state's second casino. Their inaugural team included Olympian Ian Davies and club president was Gary Carr. In its first season, the team finished ninth in the 12-team competition with nine wins.

In the 1981 NBL season, the team improved to 14 wins and finished second in the regular season. The top-seeded St. Kilda Saints decided to forgo the NBL finals to compete in the 1981 FIBA Club World Cup. This meant the Saints' finals spot went to the fifth-placed Brisbane Bullets, and Launceston entered the post-season as the competition's top seed. In the semi-final, Launceston defeated the Bullets 71–69. They then met the Nunawading Spectres in the grand final at Apollo Stadium in Adelaide, where they won 75–54 to claim the NBL championship.

In its third and final NBL season in 1982, the team won five games and finished 12th. The team was coached by Curtis Coleman. During the season, the club directors decided on a majority vote to replace Coleman with Max Pike, who helped Jim Ericksen coach the team previously. The players however would not agree to the change and would only play under Coleman.

In 2009, a public plea was made by the Northern Tasmanian Basketball Association to help locate Launceston Casino City's lost premiership silverware including the championship cup and banner. The banner was found in a Hobart shed in 2019 and was later unveiled at the Silverdome by the Tasmania JackJumpers in 2023.

== Honour roll ==
NBL Championships:	1 (1981)
NBL Finals Appearances:	1 (1981)
NBL Grand Final Appearances:	1 (1981)
NBL Most Valuable Players:	None
NBL Grand Final MVPs:	None
All-NBL First Team:	Ian Davies (1980)
NBL Coach of the Year:	None
NBL Rookie of the Year:	None
NBL Most Improved Player:	None
NBL Best Defensive Player:	None
NBL Best Sixth Man:	None

== Season by season ==
NBL champions	League champions	Runners-up	Finals berth

Season	Tier	League	Regular season					Post-season	Head coach
Season	Tier	League	Finish	Played	Wins	Losses	Win %	Post-season	Head coach
Launceston Casino City
1980	1	NBL	8th	22	9	13	.409	Did not qualify	Rex Johnstone; Phil Thomas
1981	1	NBL	2nd	22	14	8	.636	Won semifinal (Brisbane) 71–69; Won NBL final (Nunawading) 75–54	Jim Ericksen
1982	1	NBL	13th	26	5	21	.192	Did not qualify	Curtis Coleman
Regular season record				70	28	42	.400	0 regular season champions	
Finals record				2	2	0	1.000	1 NBL championships	

As of the end of the 1982 season
