= Bankstown Basketball Stadium =

Australian basketball stadium

- Address: 1 Third Avenue, Condell Park; Bankstown, New South Wales; Australia
- Facilities: 7 basketball courts; 3 netball courts; 3 volleyball courts; 2 badminton courts

Tenant
- Bankstown Bruins

Website
- bankstownbasketball.com.au

Bankstown Basketball Stadium is an indoor sports centre in Bankstown in the state of New South Wales, Australia. The arena is home to the Bankstown Bruins basketball club.

The stadium features seven basketball courts, three netball courts, three volleyball courts, two badminton courts, and a restaurant.
