= Newcastle Basketball Stadium =

Stadium in New South Wales, Australia

- Broadmeadow Basketball Stadium
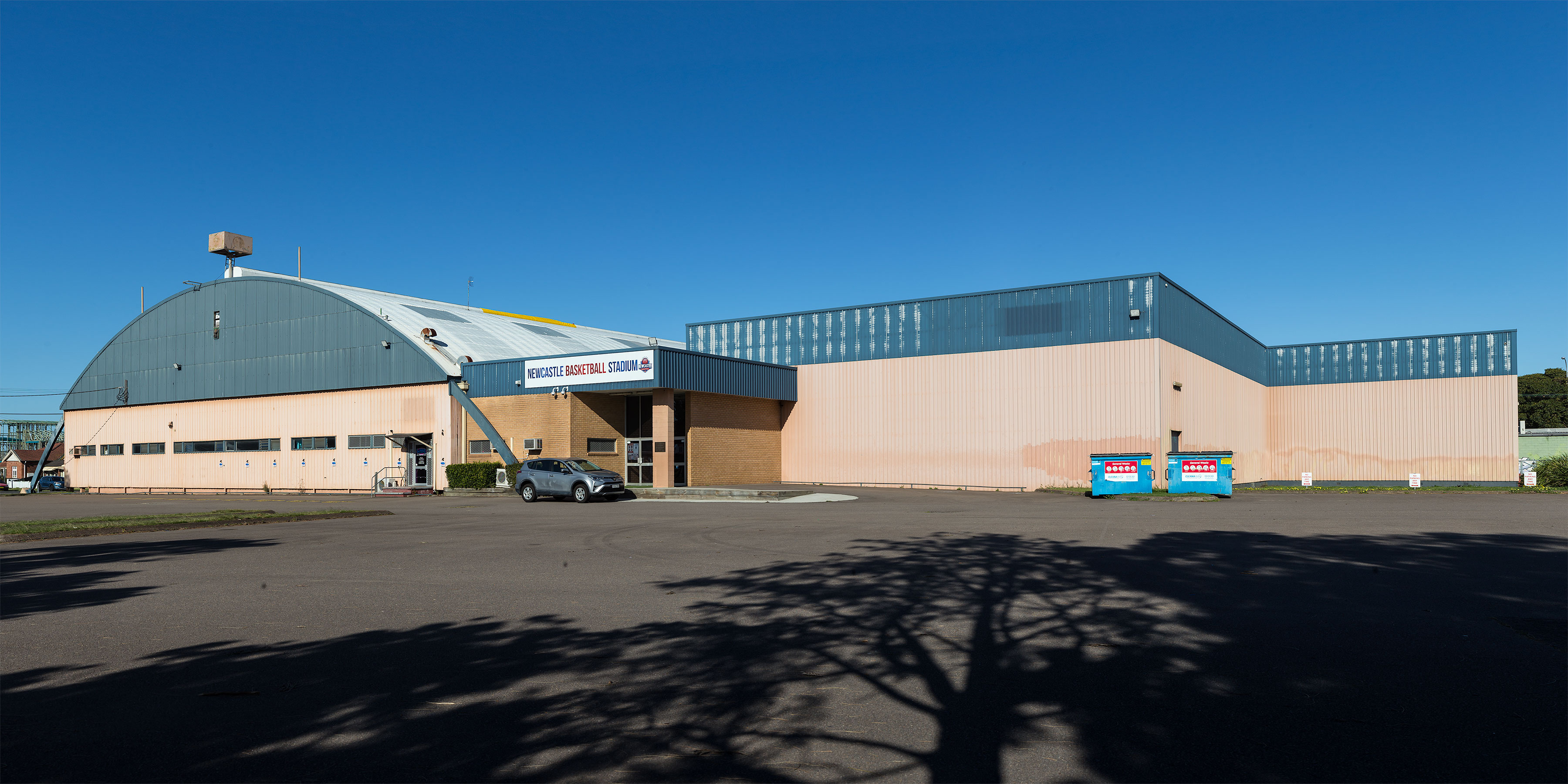
- Stadium exterior, 2021
- Interactive map of Newcastle Basketball Stadium
- Former names: Newcastle Sports Entertainment Centre
- Location: Corner of Young & Curley Roads, Broadmeadow, New South Wales
- Coordinates: 32°55′23″S 151°43′56″E
- Operator: Newcastle Basketball Association
- Capacity: Basketball / Netball: 2,200

Construction
- Opened: 1969

Tenants
- Newcastle Falcons (NBL) (1979–1991); Newcastle Falcons (NBL1 East) (1983–present)

The Newcastle Basketball Stadium, also known as the Broadmeadow Basketball Stadium and formerly known as the Newcastle Sports Entertainment Centre, is an indoor basketball stadium located in Newcastle, New South Wales, Australia and was the original home of the Newcastle Falcons of the National Basketball League from the origin of the league in 1979 until they moved to the newly built Newcastle Entertainment Centre in 1992. The stadium is currently the home of the Newcastle Basketball Association and can hold approximately 2,200 spectators.

Newcastle Basketball Association moved into the stadium in 1969.

The stadium hosted the finals of the 1982 NBL season, with two semi-finals and the grand final. In the grand final, the West Adelaide Bearcats defeated the Geelong Supercats 80–74.

The stadium hosted the 2006 ABA National Finals.

On 15 August 2015, the stadium hosted an exhibition game between the LSU Tigers college basketball team and the Newcastle All-Stars, which LSU won 89–75. Newcastle junior and future NBA player Ben Simmons competed in the game for LSU. The game drew a capacity crowd of almost 2,000, the biggest for a game at the venue in more than 25 years.
