= Bankstown Bruins =

Sydney-based basketball club

- Leagues: NBL1 East
- Founded: 1979
- History: NBL: Bankstown Bruins; 1979–1985; West Sydney Westars; 1986–1987; Waratah League / NBL1 East: Bankstown Bruins; 1991–present
- Arena: Bankstown Basketball Stadium
- Capacity: 2,500
- Location: Sydney, New South Wales
- Team colors: Navy blue & white
- CEO: Christian Gobolos
- President: Tracey Lopez
- Vice-president: Alan Morris
- Championships: 4 (1993, 1996, 1997, 2016) (M); 11 (1997, 1998, 1999, 2003, 2004, 2005, 2006, 2010, 2012, 2015, 2026) (W)
- Website: NBL1.com.au

Bankstown Bruins is a NBL1 East club based in Sydney, New South Wales. The club fields a team in both the Men's and Women's NBL1 East. The club is a division of Bankstown Basketball Association (BBA), the major administrative basketball organisation in the region. The Bruins play their home games at Bankstown Basketball Stadium.

== Club history ==
=== Background ===
In 1979, a Bankstown Bruins men's team entered the National Basketball League (NBL) for the league's inaugural season. In 1983, Robbie Cadee was named the recipient of the NBL Coach of the Year Award after helping the Bruins improve from a 2–24 record in 1982 to a 12–10 record in 1983. The team was renamed the West Sydney Westars for the 1986 NBL season. That year, the Westars finished in fifth place with a 15–12 record. Following the 1987 season, the Westars merged with the Sydney Supersonics to become the Sydney Kings.

=== Waratah League / NBL1 East ===
The Bankstown Bruins re-emerged in the early 1990s with the introduction of the Waratah League. In 1993, the men won their first title, before winning two more in 1996 and 1997. The women won a three-peat of championships between 1997 and 1999. Success continued for the club throughout the 2000s and 2010s, with the women winning six championships between 2003 and 2012. The women won their seventh title in 2015 while the men won their fourth title in 2016.

The Waratah League was rebranded as NBL1 East in 2022. The Bruins women's team did not enter the 2022 NBL1 East season but returned for the 2023 season. In the 2026 NBL1 East season, the Bruins women won their 11th championship. At the 2026 NBL1 National Finals, the Bruins women reached the championship game, where they lost 86–73 to the Knox Raiders.

== Season by season ==
NBL champions	League champions	Runners-up	Finals berth

Season	Tier	League	Regular season					Post-season	Head coach
Season	Tier	League	Finish	Played	Wins	Losses	Win %	Post-season	Head coach
Bankstown Bruins
1979	1	NBL	9th	18	3	15	.167	Did not qualify	Shaun O'Connell
1980	1	NBL	12th	22	3	19	.136	Did not qualify	Steve Fairnham; Shaun O'Connell
1981	1	NBL	11th	22	7	15	.318	Did not qualify	Steve Fairnham
1982	1	NBL	14th	26	2	24	.077	Did not qualify	Robbie Cadee
1983	1	NBL	5th	22	12	10	.545	Did not qualify	Robbie Cadee
1984	1	NBL	7th	24	10	14	.417	Did not qualify	Robbie Cadee
1985	1	NBL	12th	26	6	20	.231	Did not qualify	Robbie Cadee; Claude William
West Sydney Westars
1986	1	NBL	4th	26	15	11	.577	Lost elimination final (Illawarra) 86–105	Robbie Cadee
1987	1	NBL	11th	26	8	18	.308	Did not qualify	Mike Osbourne
Regular season record				212	66	146	.311	0 regular season champions	
Finals record				1	0	1	.000	0 NBL championships	

As of the end of the 1987 season

*Note: In 1983 and 1984, the NBL was split into Eastern and Western divisions during the regular season.

Source: West Sydney Westars Year by Year

== Honour Roll ==
NBL Championships:	None
NBL Finals Appearances:	1 (1986)
NBL Grand Final appearances:	None
NBL Most Valuable Players:	None
NBL Grand Final MVPs:	None
All-NBL First Team:	None
All-NBL Second Team:	None
NBL Coach of the Year:	Robbie Cadee (1983)
NBL Rookie of the Year:	None
NBL Most Improved Player:	None
NBL Best Defensive Player:	None
