= Sydney SuperSonics =

Defunct basketball team from Sydney, Australia

- Leagues: NBL
- Founded: 1979
- Dissolved: 1987
- History: City of Sydney Astronauts; 1979–1981; Sydney SuperSonics; 1982–1987
- Arena: Alexandria Stadium (1979–1985); State Sports Centre (1986–1987)
- Location: Sydney, New South Wales
- Team colors: Dark Green, Yellow, White
- Championships: 0

The Sydney SuperSonics are a defunct basketball team that competed in Australia's National Basketball League (NBL). The team joined the NBL in 1979 as the City of Sydney Astronauts, becoming the Sydney SuperSonics in 1982 as a result of a merger with state league team Eastern Suburbs. The SuperSonics merged with the West Sydney Westars to form the Sydney Kings in 1988.

== Honour Roll ==
NBL Championships:	None
NBL Finals Appearances:	2 (1983, 1986)
NBL Grand Final appearances:	None
NBL Most Valuable Players:	Owen Wells (1983)
NBL Grand Final MVPs:	None
All-NBL First Team:	Tiny Pinder (1985)
NBL Coach of the Year:	None
NBL Rookie of the Year:	None
NBL Most Improved Player:	None
NBL Best Defensive Player:	None

== Season by season ==
NBL champions	League champions	Runners-up	Finals berth

Season	Tier	League	Regular season					Post-season	Head coach
Season	Tier	League	Finish	Played	Wins	Losses	Win %	Post-season	Head coach
City of Sydney Astronauts
1979	1	NBL	7th	18	8	10	.444	Did not qualify	Charlie Ammit
1980	1	NBL	10th	22	7	15	.318	Did not qualify	Charlie Ammit
1981	1	NBL	9th	22	8	14	.364	Did not qualify	Charlie Ammit
Sydney Supersonics
1982	1	NBL	12th	26	7	19	.269	Did not qualify	Charlie Ammit
1983	1	NBL	1st	22	19	3	.864	Eliminated round robin 1–2	Owen Wells
1984	1	NBL	9th	24	3	21	.125	Did not qualify	Owen Wells
1985	1	NBL	11th	26	9	17	.346	Did not qualify	Paul Coughter
1986	1	NBL	6th	26	14	12	.538	Lost elimination final (Brisbane) 82–100	Owen Wells
1987	1	NBL	10th	26	9	17	.346	Did not qualify	Ken Cole
Regular season record				212	84	128	.396	1 regular season champions	
Finals record				4	1	3	.250	0 NBL championships	

As of the end of the 1987 season

*Note: In 1983 and 1984, the NBL was split into Eastern and Western divisions during the regular season.

Source: Sydney Supersonics Year by Year
