= West Adelaide Bearcats =

- League: NBL1 Central
- Established: 1946
- History: SA State League / NBL1 Central: West Adelaide Bearcats; 1957–present NBL: West Adelaide Bearcats; 1979–1984; WNBL: West Adelaide Bearcats; 1981–1992
- Arena: Port Adelaide Recreation Centre
- Location: Port Adelaide, South Australia
- Team colours: Black, Red
- Head coaches: M: Dean Nyberg W: Matthew Clarke
- Assistants: M: Blake Soares, Cain Ness W: James Alexander, Scott Herriman
- Team captain: M: Hamish Staude W: Chloe Hodges
- Championships: Pre - State League: 4 (1948, 1949, 1951, 1952) (M); SA State League / NBL1 Central: 17 (1967, 1968, 1970, 1971, 1972, 1975, 1978, 1979, 1980, 1981, 1982, 1988, 1994, 1996, 2017, 2023, 2025) (M); 8 (1968, 1980, 1983, 1987, 1992, 1993, 2007, 2022) (W); NBL: 1 (1982)
- Website: https://www.westbearcats.net

West Adelaide Bearcats is a NBL1 Central club based in Adelaide, South Australia. The club fields both a men's and women's team. The club is a division of the overarching West Adelaide Basketball Club (WABC), the major administrative basketball organisation in Adelaide's western suburbs. The Bearcats play their home games at Port Adelaide Recreation Centre.

== Club history ==
=== Background ===
The West Adelaide Basketball Club commenced in name in 1951 as a progression of the Kingston Basketball Club, which was established in 1946. The 'Bearcat' name was taken because of a close association with the University of Cincinnati in the United States. The club won four pre-state league men's premierships in 1948, 1949, 1951 and 1952.

=== SA State League / NBL1 Central ===
West Adelaide entered both a men's and women's team into the first official SA State League season in 1957, with the men's team playing in the inaugural grand final.

Between 1967 and 1996, the Bearcats men contested 23 grand finals and won 14 titles. Then between 2001 and 2014, they were grand finalists four more times but failed to claim a 15th title in that time. The Bearcats women on the other hand contested 14 grand finals between 1968 and 1993 and won six titles. The women went on to contest grand finals in 2007 and 2010 as well, collecting their seventh title in 2007. In 2017, the Bearcats men won their first title since 1996.

In 2022, the women's team won the NBL1 Central Grand Final to claim their first championship since 2007. In 2023, the men's team won the NBL1 Central Grand Final to claim their 16th championship. In 2025, the men's team returned to the NBL1 Central Grand Final, where they defeated the Central Districts Lions 83–73 to win their 17th championship. In 2026, the women's team reached the NBL1 Central Grand Final, where they lost 76–70 to the Sturt Sabres.

=== NBL and WNBL ===
1982 West Adelaide Bearcats NBL championship banner at Adelaide Entertainment Centre, January 2026

In 1979, the Bearcats entered the National Basketball League (NBL) for the competition's inaugural season. The team enjoyed success during the early days of the NBL which included Grand Finals in 1980 and 1983, and an NBL championship victory against the Geelong Cats in 1982. Bearcats championship coach Ken Richardson was the inaugural MVP of the NBL in 1979. During the 1982 regular season, West Adelaide finished first with a 21–5 record behind the play of Americans Leroy Loggins and NBL MVP Al Green. The team merged with the Adelaide 36ers at the end of the 1984 season to form one 'Adelaide' team in the NBL, with the Bearcats providing six players to the roster including Peter Ali, Ray Wood, David Spear and Mike McKay along with coach Ken Cole and team manager Keith Woods.

In 1981, the women's team was a founding member of the Women's National Basketball League (WNBL). The West Adelaide "Lady" Bearcats competed in the WNBL for 12 seasons (1981–1992). The 1984 season was the highlight of their tenure as they claimed the minor premiership and contested the 1984 WNBL Grand Final, where they lost 78–65 to the Nunawading Spectres. In 1985, the Bearcats had a team in both the WNBL and the second-tier Women's Basketball Conference (WBC).

== NBL honour roll ==
NBL Championships:	1 (1982)
NBL Finals Appearances:	4 (1980, 1981, 1982, 1983)
NBL Grand Final Appearances:	3 (1980, 1982, 1983)
NBL Most Valuable Players:	Ken Richardson (1979), Al Green (1982)
All-NBL First Team:	Ken Richardson (1980), Al Green (1981), Leroy Loggins (1982, 1983)
NBL Best Defensive Players:	Ray Wood (1980, 1981)

== NBL Season by season ==
NBL champions	League champions	Runners-up	Finals berth

Season	Tier	League	Regular season					Post-season	Head coach
Season	Tier	League	Finish	Played	Wins	Losses	Win %	Post-season	Head coach
West Adelaide Bearcats
1979	1	NBL	4th	18	12	6	.667	Did not qualify	Ken Richardson
1980	1	NBL	2nd	22	17	5	.773	Won semifinal (Brisbane) 101–94; Lost NBL final (St. Kilda) 88–113	Ken Richardson
1981	1	NBL	3rd	22	13	9	.591	Lost semifinal (Nunawading) 71–74	Ken Richardson
1982	1	NBL	1st	26	21	5	.808	Won semifinal (Coburg 94–74; Won NBL final (Geelong) 80–74	Ken Richardson
1983	1	NBL	2nd	22	17	5	.773	Qualified round robin 2–1; Won semifinal (Nunawading) 84–77; Lost NBL final (Canberra, 73–75)	Ken Cole
1984	1	NBL	6th	24	11	13	.458	Did not qualify	Ken Cole
Regular season record				134	91	43	.679	1 regular season champions	
Finals record				10	6	4	.600	1 NBL championships	

As of the end of the 1984 season

*Note: In 1983 and 1984, the NBL was split into Eastern and Western divisions during the regular season.

== 1982 NBL Championship team ==
- Coach: Ken Richardson
- Assistant: Mike Degaris
- Manager/Trainer: Keith Woods

Pos.	Starter	Bench	Bench
C	Brad Dalton	Ken Richardson
PF	Peter Ali	Peter Dawe
SF	Leroy Loggins	Trevor Maddiford
SG	Al Green	Joe Theil	Gary Thompson
PG	Ray Wood	Greg Mules

== NBL1 Central Season by Season ==
Season	League Name	Team	Regular Season					Post-Season	Head Coach
Season	League Name	Team	Finish	Played	Wins	Losses	Win%	Post-Season	Head Coach
2026	NBL1 Central	Women	1st	18	17	1	0.944	Won Semi Final (Sturt Sabres) 83-64; Lost Grand Final (Sturt Sabres) 70-76	Matt Clarke
2026	NBL1 Central	Men	7th	18	6	12	0.333	Did not qualify	Dean Nyberg
2025	NBL1 Central	Women	3rd	18	14	4	0.778	Lost Qualifying Final (Sturt Sabres) 59-62; Lost Semi Final (Woodville Warriors) 66-80	Mark Billington
2025	NBL1 Central	Men	5th	18	10	8	0.556	Won Elimination Final (South Adelaide) 81-80; Won Semi Final (Woodville Warriors) 81-68; Won Preliminary Final (Forestville Eagles) 97-95; Won Grand Final (Centrals District Lions) 83-73	Dean Nyberg
2024	NBL1 Central	Women	8th	18	7	11	0.389	Did not qualify	Mark Billington
2024	NBL1 Central	Men	4th	18	11	7	0.611	Won Elimination Final (Central District Lions) 110-98; Lost Semi Final (Sturt Sabres) 81-100	Dean Nyberg
2023	NBL1 Central	Women	6th	18	10	8	0.556	Did not qualify	Kaye-Lee Stuart
2023	NBL1 Central	Men	1st	18	15	3	0.833	Lost Semi Final (Forestville Eagles) 81-83; Won Preliminary Final (Sturt Sabres) 96-73; Won Grand Final (Forestville Eagles) 106-95	Dean Nyberg
2022	NBL1 Central	Women	1st	18	15	3	0.833	Won Semi Final (Sturt Sabres) 94-82; Won Grand Final (Sturt Sabres) 82-75	Kaye-Lee Stuart
2022	NBL1 Central	Men	7th	18	7	11	0.389	Did not qualify	Corey Maclean/ Paul Robinson
2021	NBL1 Central	Women	7th	18	8	10	0.444	Did not qualify	Corey Maclean
2021	NBL1 Central	Men	8th	18	8	10	0.444	Did not qualify	Joe Noone
2020	No season - Covid								

== State League and Club Awards ==
=== State League Awards ===
==== Lorraine Eiler (Halls) Medal ====
- Jackie Aston (nee Tedmanson) - 1965, 1967
- Cass Pujals (nee Dalton) - 1987, 1988, 1989
- Rachael Sporn - 1989, 1993
- Suzy Batkovic - 2002
- Sam Woosnam - 2006
- Olivia Levicki - 2025

==== Woollacott Medal ====
- Keith Miller - 1947
- Alan Branstrom - 1949
- Ginger Pearce - 1954
- Alan Dawe - 1958, 1959
- Werner Linder - 1966, 1969, 1971
- Ken Richardson - 1975
- Al Green - 1982
- Leroy Loggins - 1983
- Mike McKay - 1987
- Daniel Johnson - 2013
- Keanu Rasmussen - 2025

==== MVP ====
- Darrius Oldham - 2017 (M)
- Keanu Rasmussen - 2025 (M)

==== Grand Final MVP ====
- Darius Oldham - 2017 (M)
- Madelynn Utti - 2022 (W)
- Lachlan Olbrich - 2023 (M)
- Cameron Huefner - 2025 (M)

==== Merv Harris Medalist ====
- Tahlia Fejo - 2016
- Jasmin Fejo - 2019

==== Frank Angrove Medalist ====
- Daniel Cioffi - 2000, 2001
- Lachlan Olbrich - 2023
- Akoldah Gak - 2024
- Keanu Rasmussen - 2025

==== All Star 5 ====
Women

- Sam Woosnam - 1998, 1999, 2006,
- Suzy Batkovic - 2002
- Kerrin Truslove - 2003
- Lauren King - 2007
- Nikita-Lee Martin - 2009
- Tahlia Fejo - 2016
- Jasmin Fejo - 2019, 2022
- Olivia Levicki - 2025
- Chloe Hodges - 2026
- Morgan Yaeger - 2026

Men

- Daniel Cioffi - 2000, 2001
- Blake Truslove - 2000, 2001, 2002, 2003, 2014
- Brad Davidson - 2010
- Daniel Johnson - 2013
- David Sturner - 2015
- Darius Oldham - 2017
- James Legan - 2018
- Anthony Drmic - 2023
- Lachlan Olbrich - 2023
- Keanu Rasmussen - 2025

==== Coach of the Year ====
- Phil Smyth - 2003 (W)
- Sam Woosnam - 2009 (W)
- Paul Bell - 2010 (M)
- Tim Brenton - 2016 (W)
- Corey Maclean - 2018 (M)
- Mark Billington - 2025 (W)
- Matt Clarke - 2026 (W)

==== Defensive Player of the Year ====
- Erin Seward - 2005 (W)
- Ashlea Vordermaier - 2016 (W)
- Jasmine Simmons - 2022 (W)
- Chloe Hodges - 2026 (W)

=== Bearcat Medal and MVP ===
The Bearcat Medal is the top award provided to a player in an NBL1 team and is voted by two coaches and a spectator after each game on a 3, 2, 1 basis.

Most Valuable Player is selected by the most Woollacott Medal and Lorraine Eiler votes given to a West Adelaide Player. The votes are cast by referees' post-game on a 3, 2, 1 basis.

*Also won the Lorraine Eiler Medal (Previously Hall Medal) or Woollacott Medal

Year	MVP		Bearcat Medal	
Year	Women	Men	Women	Men
2026	Chloe Hodges Morgan Yaeger	Braelen Bridges	Chloe Hodges	Braelen Bridges
2025	*Olivia Levicki	*Keanu Rasmussen	Olivia Levicki	Keanu Rasmussen
2024	Sienna Grieger Elin Gustavsson	Fabijan Krslovic	Sienna Grieger Molly Coleman (2)	Fabijan Krslovic
2023	Jasmin Fejo (2)	Lachlan Olbrich	Molly Coleman	Anthony Drmic
2022	Jennie Rintala (2)	Nik De Santis	Jasmin Fejo (3)	Nik De Santis
2021	Jennie Rintala	Earnest Ross Jr	Jennie Rintala	Earnest Ross Jr
2020	No season - Covid			
2019	Jasmin Fejo	Bryan Jefferson	Jasmin Fejo (2)	Patrick Thomas (2)
2018	Ivea Nagy (2)	Patrick Thomas	Jasmin Fejo	Patrick Thomas
2017	Ivea Nagy	Darrius Oldham	Ieva Nagy	Darrius Oldham
2016	Tahlia Fejo	Demetrius Perkin	Stana Zecevic	Demetrius Perkin
2015	Anna Carbo (2)	David Sturner	Anna Carbo	David Sturner
2014	Anna Carbo	Blake Truslove (3)	Sky Langenbrinck	Jason Dawson
2013	Alana Nairn	*Daniel Johnson	Taya Crockford	Daniel Johnson
2012	Narelle Van Leuven	Junior Salters	Narelle Van Leuven	Junior Salters
2011	Nikita Lee-Martin (3)	Jeff Dowdell	Kerrin Webber (2)	Jeff Dowdell
2010	Nikita Lee-Martin (2)	Chris Molitor	Nikita Lee-Martin (3)	Brad Davidson
2009	Sam Woosnam (2)	Ryan Kersten	Nikita Lee-Martin (2)	Ryan Kersten
2008	Nikita Lee-Martin	Shane Crothers	Nikita Lee-Martin	Anthony Spadavecchia (2)
2007	Jess Mahoney	Brendan Mann	Lauren King	Anthony Spadavecchia Chris Molitor
2006	*Sam Woosnam	Danny Phillips (2)	Sam Woosnam	Danny Phillips (2)
2005	Erin Seaward	Danny Phillips	Erin Seaward	Danny Phillips
2004	Kerrin Truslove (2)	Paul Bell (2)	Kerrin Truslove	Paul Bell
2003	Melissa Hill Kerrin Truslove	Paul Bell	Melissa Hill	Blake Truslove (3)
2002	*Suzie Batkovic	Blake Truslove (2)	Suzie Batkovic	Blake Truslove (2)
2001	Nicole Ullianch	Daniel Cioffi	Nicole Ullianch	Blake Truslove

Bearcat Medal was introduced in 2001.

Year	MVP	
Year	Women	Men
2000		Daniel Cioffi
1999		Blake Truslove
1998		
1997		
1996		Willie Simmons (2)
1995	Marina Moffa	Chris Blakemore (2)
1994	Debbie Miller	Willie Simmons
1993	*Rachael Sporn (2)	Chris Blakemore
1992	Katrina Balter	Romanus Brazdauskis
1991	Merryn Jennkinson	Michael McKay (4)
1990	Jo Moyle	Michael McKay (3)
1989	*Rachael Sporn *Cass Pujals (11)	David Spear
1988	*Cass Pujals (10)	Michael McKay (2)
1987	*Cass Pujals (9)	*Michael McKay
1986	Cass Pujals (8)	Peter Ali (2)
1985	Cass Pujals (7)	Mark Leader
1984	Cass Pujals (6)	Peter Ali
1983	Cass Pujals (5)	*Leroy Loggins
1982	Jo Watts (2)	*Al Green (2)
1981	Cass Dalton (4)	Al Green
1980	Cass Dalton (3)	Ken Richardson (5)
1979	Cass Dalton (2)	Ken Richardson (4)
1978	Jo Watts	Ken Richardson (3)
1977	Cass Dalton	Ray Wood
1976	Julie Ballie	Werner Linde (6)
1975	Lyn Murtach	*Ken Richardson (2)
1974	Jacki Aston (8)	Ken Richardson
1973	Jacki Aston (7)	Alan Hughes
1972	J Barratt	Glen Marsland (2)
1971	Jacki Aston (6)	*Werner Linde (5)
1970	Jacki Aston (5)	Glenn Marsland
1969	Jacki Aston (4)	*Werner Linde (4)
1968	Jacki Aston (3)	Werner Linde (3)
1967	*Jackie Aston (2)	Bill Stuart (2)
1966	L Campbell (3)	*Werner Linde (2)
1965	*Jackie Tedmanson	Bill Stuart
1964	L Campbell (2)	Werner Linde
1963	L Campbell	Alan Dawe (7)

Year	MVP
Year	Men
1962	Alan Dawe (6)
1961	Mario Giglio
1960	Alan Dawe (5)
1959	*Alan Dawe (4)
1958	*Alan Dawe (3)
1957	Alan Dawe (2)
1956	Alan Dawe
1955	William Spear
1954	Lloyd Bain
1953	*Gordon Pearce
1952	Jack Miller
1951	
1950	
1949	*Alan Branstrom
1948	
1947	*Keith Miller

== Legends & Hall of Fame ==
=== Legends ===
- Peter Ali
- Alan Dawe
- Werner Linde
- Keith Miller
- Ted Powell
- Ken Richardson
- Rachael Sporn

==== Retired Singlets ====
- Werner Linde #7
- Rachael Sporn #14

=== Hall of Fame ===
- Jackie Aston (nee Tedmanson)
- Gordon Clamp
- Deb Clarke
- Alan Branstrom
- Jo Gilbertson (nee Watts)
- Al Green
- Leroy Loggins
- Gordon Pearce
- Glenn Marsland
- Mike McKay
- Pat Mickan
- Cass Pujals (nee Dalton)
- David Spear
- Blake Truslove
- Ray Wood
- Sam Woosnam
- Julie Wright (nee Baillie)

=== Honour Roll ===
- Terry Aston
- Lloyd Bain
- Trina Balter
- Suzy Batkovic
- Dick Bruning
- Brad Dalton
- Dion Grieger
- Alan Hughes
- Bob Hunnerup
- Denis Jones
- Shayne Kaesler
- Roger King
- Fred Maddiford
- Trevor Maddiford
- Debbie Miller
- Jack Miller
- Heather McKinnon
- Dora Mudge
- Vic Robinson
- Tracey Scrutton
- Anthony Spadavecchia
- Fred Specht
- Kaye-Lee Stuart
- Russell Terrett
- Brian Williamson
- Margaret Williamson
- Jack Wood
- John Wright
