= 1986 NBL season =

- League: National Basketball League
- Sport: Basketball
- Duration: 25 April – 28 September 1986; 1 – 4 October 1986 (semi-finals); 11 – 19 October 1986 (Grand Final)
- Teams: 14
- TV partner(s): ABC, SAS-10, TV0, STW9

Regular season
- Season champions: Adelaide 36ers
- Season MVP: Leroy Loggins (Brisbane)
- Top scorer: Andrew Gaze (Melbourne)

Finals
- Champions: Adelaide 36ers (1st title)
- Runners-up: Brisbane Bullets
- Finals MVP: Mark Davis (Adelaide)

NBL seasons
- ← 1985 1987 →

The 1986 NBL season was the eighth season of competition since its establishment in 1979. A total of 14 teams contested the league.

== Clubs ==
The NBL had 14 clubs spread across all Australian states and territories with the exception of the Northern Territory.

Club	Location	Home Venue	Capacity	Founded	Head coach
Adelaide 36ers	Adelaide, South Australia	Apollo Stadium	3,000	1982	(Australia) Ken Cole
Brisbane Bullets	Brisbane, Queensland	Sleeman Sports Centre; Brisbane Entertainment Centre	2,700; 13,500	1979	(Australia) Brian Kerle
Canberra Cannons	Canberra, Australian Capital Territory	AIS Arena	5,200	1979	(United States) Bob Turner
Coburg Giants	(Victoria (state)) Melbourne, Victoria	The Glass House	7,200	1980	(Australia) Les Riddle
Geelong Supercats	(Victoria (state)) Geelong, Victoria	Geelong Arena	2,000	1982	(United States) Ken Richardson
Hobart Devils	Hobart, Tasmania	Kingborough Sports Centre	1,800	1983	(United States) David Adkins
Illawarra Hawks	Wollongong, New South Wales	Illawarra Basketball Stadium	2,000	1979	(Australia) Dave Lindstrom
Melbourne Tigers	(Victoria (state)) Melbourne, Victoria	Albert Park Basketball Stadium	2,000	1931	(Australia) Lindsay Gaze
Newcastle Falcons	Newcastle, New South Wales	Broadmeadow Basketball Stadium	2,200	1979	(Australia) Steve Johansen
Nunawading Spectres	(Victoria (state)) Melbourne, Victoria	Burwood Stadium	2,000	1979	(Australia) Barry Barnes
Perth Wildcats	Perth, Western Australia	Perry Lakes Basketball Stadium	1,500	1982	(Australia) Jay Brehmer
St. Kilda Saints	(Victoria (state)) Melbourne, Victoria	The Glass House	7,200	1979	(Australia) Andris Blicavs
Sydney Supersonics	Sydney, New South Wales	State Sports Centre	5,006	1982	(Australia) Owen Wells
West Sydney Westars	Sydney, New South Wales	State Sports Centre	5,006	1982	(Australia) Robbie Cadee

== Regular season ==
The home and away season took place over 21 rounds between 25 April 1986 and 28 September 1986.

The Adelaide 36ers had a near perfect regular season recording a 24–2 win–loss record which included an undefeated 13-0 home record at the Apollo Stadium, a feat not matched before or since in the NBL. Adelaide's only two losses of the year came away in Round 6 when they lost 89–87 to the West Sydney Westars in Sydney, and in Round 11 against the Coburg Giants in Melbourne when they went down 116–114. Both the Westars and Giants won the games on last second baskets. The 36ers were easily the best offensive team in the league, averaging 116 points per game (11.5 points more per game than the next best team, the Brisbane Bullets), while they had the 5th best defence in the NBL only giving up 96.5 points per game.

6'5" (196 cm) Brisbane Bullets swingman Leroy Loggins was selected as the NBL's Most Valuable Player. Loggins averaged 29.8 points, 8.9 rebounds, 3.1 assists, 3.3 steals and 1.3 blocks per game in 1986. It was Loggins' 2nd NBL MVP award having also won in 1984.

=== Round 1 ===
Date	Home	Score	Away	Venue	Crowd	Box Score
25/04/1986	Perth Wildcats	91–99	Sydney SuperSonics	Perry Lakes Basketball Stadium	N/A	boxscore
25/04/1986	Brisbane Bullets	115–83	Hobart Devils	Sleeman Sports Centre	N/A	boxscore
26/04/1986	Adelaide 36ers	107–96	Sydney SuperSonics	Apollo Entertainment Centre	N/A	boxscore
26/04/1986	Canberra Cannons	98–95	Hobart Devils	AIS Arena	N/A	boxscore
26/04/1986	Geelong Cats	121–112	Illawarra Hawks	Geelong Arena	N/A	boxscore
26/04/1986	St. Kilda Saints	116–110	Melbourne Tigers	Albert Park Basketball Stadium	N/A	boxscore
26/04/1986	Newcastle Falcons	86–92	West Sydney Westars	Newcastle Sports Entertainment Centre	N/A	boxscore
27/04/1986	Nunawading Spectres	103–98	St. Kilda Saints	Burwood Stadium	N/A	boxscore
27/04/1986	Coburg Giants	104–103	Illawarra Hawks	Ken Watson Stadium	N/A	boxscore

=== Round 2 ===
Date	Home	Score	Away	Venue	Crowd	Box Score
2/05/1986	Perth Wildcats	103–89	Hobart Devils	Perry Lakes Basketball Stadium	N/A	boxscore
2/05/1986	Newcastle Falcons	88–93	Brisbane Bullets	Newcastle Sports Entertainment Centre	N/A	boxscore
2/05/1986	Sydney SuperSonics	94–82	St. Kilda Saints	State Sports Centre	N/A	boxscore
3/05/1986	Adelaide 36ers	108–72	Hobart Devils	Apollo Entertainment Centre	N/A	boxscore
3/05/1986	Nunawading Spectres	94–117	Canberra Cannons	Burwood Stadium	N/A	boxscore
3/05/1986	Geelong Cats	123–105	Coburg Giants	Geelong Arena	N/A	boxscore
3/05/1986	West Sydney Westars	63–93	Brisbane Bullets	State Sports Centre	N/A	boxscore
3/05/1986	Illawarra Hawks	118–86	St. Kilda Saints	Beaton Park Stadium	N/A	boxscore
4/05/1986	Melbourne Tigers	89–106	Canberra Cannons	Albert Park Basketball Stadium	N/A	boxscore

=== Round 3 ===
Date	Home	Score	Away	Venue	Crowd	Box Score
9/05/1986	Perth Wildcats	85–97	Illawarra Hawks	Perry Lakes Basketball Stadium	N/A	boxscore
9/05/1986	Brisbane Bullets	95–89	Sydney SuperSonics	Sleeman Sports Centre	N/A	boxscore
9/05/1986	Hobart Devils	95–88	Nunawading Spectres	Kingsborough Sports Centre	N/A	boxscore
10/05/1986	Adelaide 36ers	114–110	Illawarra Hawks	Apollo Entertainment Centre	N/A	boxscore
10/05/1986	Canberra Cannons	87–77	Sydney SuperSonics	AIS Arena	N/A	boxscore
10/05/1986	St. Kilda Saints	105–116	Nunawading Spectres	Albert Park Basketball Stadium	N/A	boxscore
10/05/1986	West Sydney Westars	115–106	Coburg Giants	State Sports Centre	N/A	boxscore
11/05/1986	Coburg Giants	102–105	Melbourne Tigers	Ken Watson Stadium	N/A	boxscore

=== Round 4 ===
Date	Home	Score	Away	Venue	Crowd	Box Score
16/05/1986	Hobart Devils	69–97	Adelaide 36ers	Kingsborough Sports Centre	N/A	boxscore
16/05/1986	West Sydney Westars	88–96	Canberra Cannons	State Sports Centre	N/A	boxscore
16/05/1986	Illawarra Hawks	107–82	Newcastle Falcons	Beaton Park Stadium	N/A	boxscore
17/05/1986	Canberra Cannons	104–80	Illawarra Hawks	AIS Arena	N/A	boxscore
17/05/1986	Brisbane Bullets	77–71	West Sydney Westars	Sleeman Sports Centre	N/A	boxscore
17/05/1986	Geelong Cats	109–97	Perth Wildcats	Geelong Arena	N/A	boxscore
17/05/1986	Sydney SuperSonics	80–91	Newcastle Falcons	State Sports Centre	N/A	boxscore
17/05/1986	St. Kilda Saints	97–125	Adelaide 36ers	Albert Park Basketball Stadium	N/A	boxscore
18/05/1986	Geelong Cats	112–108	Melbourne Tigers	Geelong Arena	N/A	boxscore
18/05/1986	Coburg Giants	116–84	Perth Wildcats	Ken Watson Stadium	N/A	boxscore
18/05/1986	Nunawading Spectres	100–79	Sydney SuperSonics	Burwood Stadium	N/A	boxscore

=== Round 5 ===
Date	Home	Score	Away	Venue	Crowd	Box Score
23/05/1986	Perth Wildcats	93–91	Canberra Cannons	Perry Lakes Basketball Stadium	N/A	boxscore
23/05/1986	Hobart Devils	129–96	Melbourne Tigers	Kingsborough Sports Centre	N/A	boxscore
23/05/1986	Newcastle Falcons	152–126	Geelong Cats	Newcastle Sports Entertainment Centre	N/A	boxscore
23/05/1986	Sydney SuperSonics	84–85	Brisbane Bullets	State Sports Centre	N/A	boxscore
24/05/1986	Adelaide 36ers	124–91	Canberra Cannons	Apollo Entertainment Centre	N/A	boxscore
24/05/1986	Nunawading Spectres	99–118	Coburg Giants	Burwood Stadium	N/A	boxscore
24/05/1986	West Sydney Westars	83–93	Geelong Cats	State Sports Centre	N/A	boxscore
24/05/1986	Illawarra Hawks	94–90	Brisbane Bullets	Beaton Park Stadium	N/A	boxscore
25/05/1986	Melbourne Tigers	120–111	St. Kilda Saints	Albert Park Basketball Stadium	N/A	boxscore

=== Round 6 ===
Date	Home	Score	Away	Venue	Crowd	Box Score
30/05/1986	Brisbane Bullets	99–85	Nunawading Spectres	Brisbane Entertainment Centre	N/A	boxscore
30/05/1986	Hobart Devils	94–99	Perth Wildcats	Kingsborough Sports Centre	N/A	boxscore
30/05/1986	Newcastle Falcons	96–98	Adelaide 36ers	Newcastle Sports Entertainment Centre	N/A	boxscore
30/05/1986	Sydney SuperSonics	99–100	Geelong Cats	State Sports Centre	N/A	boxscore
31/05/1986	Melbourne Tigers	111–121	Coburg Giants	Albert Park Basketball Stadium	N/A	boxscore
31/05/1986	Canberra Cannons	111–88	Nunawading Spectres	AIS Arena	N/A	boxscore
31/05/1986	West Sydney Westars	89–87	Adelaide 36ers	State Sports Centre	N/A	boxscore
31/05/1986	Illawarra Hawks	122–91	Geelong Cats	Beaton Park Stadium	N/A	boxscore
1/06/1986	St. Kilda Saints	108–109	Perth Wildcats	Albert Park Basketball Stadium	N/A	boxscore

=== Round 7 ===
Date	Home	Score	Away	Venue	Crowd	Box Score
6/06/1986	Perth Wildcats	96–105	Newcastle Falcons	Perry Lakes Basketball Stadium	N/A	boxscore
6/06/1986	Sydney SuperSonics	91–94	Canberra Cannons	State Sports Centre	N/A	boxscore
7/06/1986	St. Kilda Saints	86–119	Brisbane Bullets	Albert Park Basketball Stadium	N/A	boxscore
7/06/1986	Adelaide 36ers	119–92	Newcastle Falcons	Apollo Entertainment Centre	N/A	boxscore
7/06/1986	Geelong Cats	140–124	Hobart Devils	Geelong Arena	N/A	boxscore
7/06/1986	West Sydney Westars	76–82	Nunawading Spectres	State Sports Centre	N/A	boxscore
7/06/1986	Illawarra Hawks	90–93	Canberra Cannons	Beaton Park Stadium	N/A	boxscore
8/06/1986	Melbourne Tigers	108–124	West Sydney Westars	Albert Park Basketball Stadium	N/A	boxscore
8/06/1986	Coburg Giants	115–86	Nunawading Spectres	Melbourne Sports and Entertainment Centre	N/A	boxscore

=== Round 8 ===
Date	Home	Score	Away	Venue	Crowd	Box Score
13/06/1986	Brisbane Bullets	132–134	Coburg Giants	Brisbane Entertainment Centre	N/A	boxscore
13/06/1986	Hobart Devils	99–107	Illawarra Hawks	Kingsborough Sports Centre	N/A	boxscore
14/06/1986	Perth Wildcats	85–117	Adelaide 36ers	Perry Lakes Basketball Stadium	N/A	boxscore
14/06/1986	Nunawading Spectres	89–103	Geelong Cats	Burwood Stadium	N/A	boxscore
14/06/1986	Canberra Cannons	120–104	Coburg Giants	AIS Arena	N/A	boxscore
14/06/1986	St. Kilda Saints	82–90	Illawarra Hawks	Albert Park Basketball Stadium	N/A	boxscore
14/06/1986	Newcastle Falcons	95–107	Sydney SuperSonics	Newcastle Sports Entertainment Centre	N/A	boxscore
15/06/1986	Melbourne Tigers	107–123	Geelong Cats	Albert Park Basketball Stadium	N/A	boxscore

=== Round 9 ===
Date	Home	Score	Away	Venue	Crowd	Box Score
20/06/1986	Perth Wildcats	97–92	Nunawading Spectres	Perry Lakes Basketball Stadium	N/A	boxscore
20/06/1986	Hobart Devils	100–104	Newcastle Falcons	Kingsborough Sports Centre	N/A	boxscore
20/06/1986	Sydney SuperSonics	99–83	Melbourne Tigers	State Sports Centre	N/A	boxscore
21/06/1986	Adelaide 36ers	124–104	Nunawading Spectres	Apollo Entertainment Centre	N/A	boxscore
21/06/1986	Brisbane Bullets	113–94	Canberra Cannons	Brisbane Entertainment Centre	N/A	boxscore
21/06/1986	Geelong Cats	107–106	West Sydney Westars	Geelong Arena	N/A	boxscore
21/06/1986	Illawarra Hawks	101–96	Melbourne Tigers	Beaton Park Stadium	N/A	boxscore
22/06/1986	St. Kilda Saints	128–140	Newcastle Falcons	Albert Park Basketball Stadium	N/A	boxscore
22/06/1986	Coburg Giants	99–103	West Sydney Westars	Melbourne Sports and Entertainment Centre	N/A	boxscore

=== Round 10 ===
Date	Home	Score	Away	Venue	Crowd	Box Score
11/07/1986	Nunawading Spectres	76–94	West Sydney Westars	Burwood Stadium	N/A	boxscore
11/07/1986	Canberra Cannons	90–93	Brisbane Bullets	AIS Arena	N/A	boxscore
11/07/1986	Illawarra Hawks	87–73	Perth Wildcats	Beaton Park Stadium	N/A	boxscore
12/07/1986	Adelaide 36ers	124–83	Perth Wildcats	Apollo Entertainment Centre	N/A	boxscore
12/07/1986	Melbourne Tigers	109–130	Hobart Devils	Albert Park Basketball Stadium	N/A	boxscore
12/07/1986	Brisbane Bullets	94–100	Illawarra Hawks	Brisbane Entertainment Centre	N/A	boxscore
12/07/1986	Geelong Cats	112–117	Sydney SuperSonics	Geelong Arena	N/A	boxscore
12/07/1986	Newcastle Falcons	100–98	Nunawading Spectres	Newcastle Sports Entertainment Centre	N/A	boxscore
13/07/1986	St. Kilda Saints	116–110	Hobart Devils	Albert Park Basketball Stadium	N/A	boxscore
13/07/1986	Coburg Giants	85–88	Sydney SuperSonics	Melbourne Sports and Entertainment Centre	N/A	boxscore

=== Round 11 ===
Date	Home	Score	Away	Venue	Crowd	Box Score
18/07/1986	Hobart Devils	125–90	St. Kilda Saints	Kingsborough Sports Centre	N/A	boxscore
19/07/1986	Nunawading Spectres	95–92	Brisbane Bullets	Burwood Stadium	N/A	boxscore
19/07/1986	Geelong Cats	107–109	Adelaide 36ers	Geelong Arena	N/A	boxscore
19/07/1986	Newcastle Falcons	94–116	Canberra Cannons	Newcastle Sports Entertainment Centre	N/A	boxscore
20/07/1986	Melbourne Tigers	111–109	Brisbane Bullets	Albert Park Basketball Stadium	N/A	boxscore
20/07/1986	Coburg Giants	116–114	Adelaide 36ers	Melbourne Sports and Entertainment Centre	N/A	boxscore

=== Round 12 ===
Date	Home	Score	Away	Venue	Crowd	Box Score
25/07/1986	Perth Wildcats	125–104	Melbourne Tigers	Perry Lakes Basketball Stadium	N/A	boxscore
25/07/1986	Canberra Cannons	116–104	Geelong Cats	AIS Arena	N/A	boxscore
25/07/1986	West Sydney Westars	107–98	Newcastle Falcons	State Sports Centre	N/A	boxscore
25/07/1986	Illawarra Hawks	78–68	Nunawading Spectres	Beaton Park Stadium	N/A	boxscore
26/07/1986	Adelaide 36ers	140–101	Melbourne Tigers	Apollo Entertainment Centre	N/A	boxscore
26/07/1986	Brisbane Bullets	106–97	Geelong Cats	Sleeman Sports Centre	N/A	boxscore
26/07/1986	Sydney SuperSonics	97–80	Nunawading Spectres	State Sports Centre	N/A	boxscore
27/07/1986	St. Kilda Saints	117–120	Coburg Giants	Albert Park Basketball Stadium	N/A	boxscore

=== Round 13 ===
Date	Home	Score	Away	Venue	Crowd	Box Score
1/08/1986	Perth Wildcats	91–99	Brisbane Bullets	Perry Lakes Basketball Stadium	N/A	boxscore
1/08/1986	West Sydney Westars	108–98	Melbourne Tigers	State Sports Centre	N/A	boxscore
2/08/1986	Adelaide 36ers	120–92	Brisbane Bullets	Apollo Entertainment Centre	N/A	boxscore
2/08/1986	Nunawading Spectres	117–105	Hobart Devils	Burwood Stadium	N/A	boxscore
2/08/1986	Geelong Cats	104–115	Canberra Cannons	Geelong Arena	N/A	boxscore
2/08/1986	Newcastle Falcons	156–133	Melbourne Tigers	Newcastle Sports Entertainment Centre	N/A	boxscore
2/08/1986	Sydney SuperSonics	89–86	Illawarra Hawks	State Sports Centre	N/A	boxscore
3/08/1986	Coburg Giants	99–93	Canberra Cannons	Melbourne Sports and Entertainment Centre	N/A	boxscore

=== Round 14 ===
Date	Home	Score	Away	Venue	Crowd	Box Score
8/08/1986	Perth Wildcats	117–103	Coburg Giants	Perry Lakes Basketball Stadium	N/A	boxscore
8/08/1986	Canberra Cannons	111–93	Newcastle Falcons	AIS Arena	N/A	boxscore
8/08/1986	Hobart Devils	109–117	Geelong Cats	Kingsborough Sports Centre	N/A	boxscore
8/08/1986	West Sydney Westars	109–110	Sydney SuperSonics	State Sports Centre	N/A	boxscore
9/08/1986	Adelaide 36ers	137–111	Coburg Giants	Apollo Entertainment Centre	N/A	boxscore
9/08/1986	Melbourne Tigers	114–130	Nunawading Spectres	Albert Park Basketball Stadium	N/A	boxscore
9/08/1986	Brisbane Bullets	113–99	Newcastle Falcons	Sleeman Sports Centre	N/A	boxscore
10/08/1986	St. Kilda Saints	121–118	Geelong Cats	Albert Park Basketball Stadium	N/A	boxscore

=== Round 15 ===
Date	Home	Score	Away	Venue	Crowd	Box Score
15/08/1986	Hobart Devils	91–90	Brisbane Bullets	Kingsborough Sports Centre	N/A	boxscore
15/08/1986	West Sydney Westars	123–111	St. Kilda Saints	State Sports Centre	N/A	boxscore
15/08/1986	Illawarra Hawks	79–100	Adelaide 36ers	Beaton Park Stadium	N/A	boxscore
16/08/1986	Melbourne Tigers	112–96	Perth Wildcats	Albert Park Basketball Stadium	N/A	boxscore
16/08/1986	Canberra Cannons	99–87	West Sydney Westars	AIS Arena	N/A	boxscore
16/08/1986	Newcastle Falcons	138–140	St. Kilda Saints	Newcastle Sports Entertainment Centre	N/A	boxscore
16/08/1986	Sydney SuperSonics	75–100	Adelaide 36ers	State Sports Centre	N/A	boxscore
17/08/1986	Nunawading Spectres	99–95	Perth Wildcats	Burwood Stadium	N/A	boxscore
17/08/1986	Coburg Giants	116–104	Hobart Devils	Ken Watson Stadium	N/A	boxscore

=== Round 16 ===
Date	Home	Score	Away	Venue	Crowd	Box Score
22/08/1986	Hobart Devils	90–76	Canberra Cannons	Kingsborough Sports Centre	N/A	boxscore
22/08/1986	West Sydney Westars	102–93	Illawarra Hawks	State Sports Centre	N/A	boxscore
23/08/1986	Geelong Cats	86–88	Brisbane Bullets	Geelong Arena	N/A	boxscore
23/08/1986	St. Kilda Saints	121–133	Canberra Cannons	Albert Park Basketball Stadium	N/A	boxscore
23/08/1986	Newcastle Falcons	89–88	Illawarra Hawks	Newcastle Sports Entertainment Centre	N/A	boxscore
23/08/1986	Sydney SuperSonics	117–80	Perth Wildcats	State Sports Centre	N/A	boxscore
24/08/1986	Melbourne Tigers	121–109	Sydney SuperSonics	Albert Park Basketball Stadium	N/A	boxscore
24/08/1986	Coburg Giants	104–99	Brisbane Bullets	Ken Watson Stadium	N/A	boxscore

=== Round 17 ===
Date	Home	Score	Away	Venue	Crowd	Box Score
29/08/1986	Hobart Devils	101–86	Coburg Giants	Kingsborough Sports Centre	N/A	boxscore
29/08/1986	Perth Wildcats	92–100	Geelong Cats	Perry Lakes Basketball Stadium	N/A	boxscore
29/08/1986	Canberra Cannons	118–100	St. Kilda Saints	AIS Arena	N/A	boxscore
29/08/1986	Sydney SuperSonics	97–82	West Sydney Westars	State Sports Centre	N/A	boxscore
30/08/1986	Adelaide 36ers	120–119	Geelong Cats	Apollo Entertainment Centre	N/A	boxscore
30/08/1986	Melbourne Tigers	99–100	Illawarra Hawks	Albert Park Basketball Stadium	N/A	boxscore
30/08/1986	Brisbane Bullets	119–100	St. Kilda Saints	Brisbane Entertainment Centre	N/A	boxscore
30/08/1986	Newcastle Falcons	121–127	Coburg Giants	Newcastle Sports Entertainment Centre	N/A	boxscore
31/08/1986	Nunawading Spectres	110–90	Illawarra Hawks	Burwood Stadium	N/A	boxscore

=== Round 18 ===
Date	Home	Score	Away	Venue	Crowd	Box Score
5/09/1986	Perth Wildcats	120–103	St. Kilda Saints	Perry Lakes Basketball Stadium	N/A	boxscore
5/09/1986	Brisbane Bullets	118–105	Melbourne Tigers	Brisbane Entertainment Centre	N/A	boxscore
5/09/1986	West Sydney Westars	103–84	Hobart Devils	State Sports Centre	N/A	boxscore
5/09/1986	Illawarra Hawks	128–109	Coburg Giants	Beaton Park Stadium	N/A	boxscore
6/09/1986	Adelaide 36ers	138–98	St. Kilda Saints	Apollo Entertainment Centre	N/A	boxscore
6/09/1986	Canberra Cannons	131–113	Melbourne Tigers	AIS Arena	N/A	boxscore
6/09/1986	Geelong Cats	115–128	Nunawading Spectres	Geelong Arena	N/A	boxscore
6/09/1986	Newcastle Falcons	102–101	Hobart Devils	Newcastle Sports Entertainment Centre	N/A	boxscore
6/09/1986	Sydney SuperSonics	114–95	Coburg Giants	State Sports Centre	N/A	boxscore

=== Round 19 ===
Date	Home	Score	Away	Venue	Crowd	Box Score
12/09/1986	West Sydney Westars	104–89	Perth Wildcats	State Sports Centre	N/A	boxscore
12/09/1986	Illawarra Hawks	103–113	Hobart Devils	Beaton Park Stadium	N/A	boxscore
12/09/1986	Geelong Cats	126–118	St. Kilda Saints	Geelong Arena	N/A	boxscore
13/09/1986	Nunawading Spectres	142–120	Melbourne Tigers	Burwood Stadium	N/A	boxscore
13/09/1986	Canberra Cannons	104–118	Adelaide 36ers	AIS Arena	N/A	boxscore
13/09/1986	Newcastle Falcons	109–98	Perth Wildcats	Newcastle Sports Entertainment Centre	N/A	boxscore
13/09/1986	Sydney SuperSonics	125–94	Hobart Devils	State Sports Centre	N/A	boxscore
14/09/1986	Brisbane Bullets	115–124	Adelaide 36ers	Brisbane Entertainment Centre	N/A	boxscore
14/09/1986	Coburg Giants	110–114	St. Kilda Saints	Ken Watson Stadium	N/A	boxscore

=== Round 20 ===
Date	Home	Score	Away	Venue	Crowd	Box Score
17/09/1986	Illawarra Hawks	98–97	West Sydney Westars	Beaton Park Stadium	N/A	boxscore
19/09/1986	Perth Wildcats	81–89	West Sydney Westars	Perry Lakes Basketball Stadium	N/A	boxscore
19/09/1986	Hobart Devils	96–93	Sydney SuperSonics	Kingsborough Sports Centre	N/A	boxscore
20/09/1986	Adelaide 36ers	124–98	West Sydney Westars	Apollo Entertainment Centre	N/A	boxscore
20/09/1986	Melbourne Tigers	132–121	Newcastle Falcons	Albert Park Basketball Stadium	N/A	boxscore
21/09/1986	Nunawading Spectres	129–107	Newcastle Falcons	Burwood Stadium	N/A	boxscore
21/09/1986	St. Kilda Saints	98–111	Sydney SuperSonics	Albert Park Basketball Stadium	N/A	boxscore
21/09/1986	Coburg Giants	126–93	Geelong Cats	Melbourne Sports and Entertainment Centre	N/A	boxscore

=== Round 21 ===
Date	Home	Score	Away	Venue	Crowd	Box Score
26/09/1986	Brisbane Bullets	112–101	Perth Wildcats	Brisbane Entertainment Centre	N/A	boxscore
26/09/1986	Hobart Devils	104–106	West Sydney Westars	Kingsborough Sports Centre	N/A	boxscore
27/09/1986	Nunawading Spectres	94–98	Adelaide 36ers	Burwood Stadium	N/A	boxscore
27/09/1986	Canberra Cannons	114–78	Perth Wildcats	AIS Arena	N/A	boxscore
27/09/1986	Geelong Cats	129–120	Newcastle Falcons	Geelong Arena	N/A	boxscore
27/09/1986	Illawarra Hawks	90–82	Sydney SuperSonics	Beaton Park Stadium	N/A	boxscore
27/09/1986	St. Kilda Saints	96–100	West Sydney Westars	Albert Park Basketball Stadium	N/A	boxscore
28/09/1986	Melbourne Tigers	117–130	Adelaide 36ers	Albert Park Basketball Stadium	N/A	boxscore
28/09/1986	Coburg Giants	110–104	Newcastle Falcons	Melbourne Sports and Entertainment Centre	N/A	boxscore

== Ladder ==
Pos	1986 NBL season											
Pos	Team	Pld	W	L	PCT	Last 5	Streak	Home	Away	PF	PA	PP
1	Adelaide 36ers	26	24	2	92.31%	5–0	W12	13–0	11–2	3016	2510	120.16%
2	Canberra Cannons	26	19	7	73.11%	4–1	W1	11–2	8–5	2718	2520	107.86%
3	Brisbane Bullets	26	17	9	65.38%	3–2	W1	10–3	7–6	2650	2485	106.64%
4	West Sydney Westars^{1}	26	15	11	57.69%	3–2	W2	8–5	7–6	2519	2492	101.08%
5	Illawarra Hawks^{1}	26	15	11	57.69%	3–2	W2	10–3	5–8	2551	2472	103.20%
6	Sydney Supersonics^{2}	26	14	12	53.85%	3–2	W2	8–5	7–6	2518	2438	103.28%
7	Geelong Cats^{2}	26	14	12	53.85%	2–3	W1	8–5	6–7	2875	2889	99.52%
8	Coburg Giants^{2}	26	14	12	53.85%	2–3	W2	9–4	5–8	2841	2825	100.57%
9	Nunawading Spectres	26	12	14	46.15%	4–1	L1	8–5	4–9	2592	2642	98.11%
10	Newcastle Falcons	26	10	16	38.46%	1–4	L4	6–7	4–9	2782	2878	96.66%
11	Hobart Devils	26	9	17	34.62%	2–3	L1	7–6	2–11	2606	2704	96.38%
12	Perth Wildcats	26	8	18	30.77%	0–5	L5	6–7	2–11	2458	2693	91.27%
13	Melbourne Tigers	26	6	20	23.08%	1–4	L1	5–8	1–12	2822	3089	91.36%
14	St. Kilda Saints	26	5	21	19.23%	1–4	L2	3–10	2–11	2742	3053	89.81%

Updated to match(es) played on 28 September 1986. Source: NBL.com.au

The NBL tie-breaker system as outlined in the NBL Rules and Regulations states that in the case of an identical win–loss record, the results in games played between the teams will determine order of seeding.

^{1}Head-to-Head between West Sydney Westars and Illawarra Hawks (1-1). West Sydney Westars won For and Against (+8).

^{2}3-way Head-to-Head between Sydney Supersonics (3-1), Geelong Cats (2-2) and Coburg Giants (1-3).

== Finals ==
=== Playoff bracket ===
Elimination Finals
4	West Sydney Westars	86
5	Illawarra Hawks	105
3	Brisbane Bullets	100
6	Sydney SuperSonics	82

Semifinals
1	Adelaide 36ers	116
5	Illawarra Hawks	92
2	Canberra Cannons	100
3	Brisbane Bullets	120

Grand Final
1	Adelaide 36ers	122	83	113
3	Brisbane Bullets	119	104	91

There were two Elimination Finals, two Semifinals, and then best of three Grand Final series. All of the Elimination Finals and Semifinals were sudden death. As the top two teams in the regular season the Adelaide 36ers and Canberra Cannons automatically qualified to host a home Semifinal.

=== Elimination Finals ===
Date	Home	Score	Away	Venue	Crowd	Box Score
1/10/1986	West Sydney Westars	86–105	Illawarra Hawks	State Sports Centre	N/A	boxscore
1/10/1986	Brisbane Bullets	100–82	Sydney SuperSonics	Brisbane Entertainment Centre	N/A	boxscore

=== Semifinals ===
Date	Home	Score	Away	Venue	Crowd	Box Score
4/10/1986	Canberra Cannons	100–120	Brisbane Bullets	AIS Arena	N/A	boxscore
4/10/1986	Adelaide 36ers	116–92	Illawarra Hawks	Apollo Entertainment Centre	N/A	boxscore

=== Grand Final ===
After being a single game from 1979-1985, 1986 saw the establishment of the best of three Grand Final series. Game 1 in Brisbane saw a then NBL record attendance of over 11,000. The game went into overtime with the 36ers coming out on top with a 122-119 win. Game 2 saw Adelaide lose its only game at home for the season when the Bullets kept the series alive with a 104-83 win. Adelaide wrapped up its first NBL Championship with a 113-91 win in Game 3 at the Apollo Stadium.

Regular season MVP winner, Brisbane's Leroy Loggins, fouled out of both Games 1 and 3. Adelaide import Power forward Mark Davis was selected as the Grand Final MVP. Davis averaged 25.0 points, 19.3 rebounds and 1.6 assists over the series.

Date	Home	Score	Away	Venue	Crowd	Box Score
11/10/1986	Brisbane Bullets	119–122	Adelaide 36ers	Brisbane Entertainment Centre	N/A	boxscore
17/10/1986	Adelaide 36ers	83–104	Brisbane Bullets	Apollo Entertainment Centre	N/A	boxscore
19/10/1986	Adelaide 36ers	113–91	Brisbane Bullets	Apollo Entertainment Centre	N/A	boxscore

== 1986 NBL statistics leaders ==
Category	Player	Team	Stat
Points per game	Andrew Gaze	Melbourne Tigers	922 pts
Rebounds per game	Mark Davis	Adelaide 36ers	16.1
Assists per game	Damian Keogh	West Sydney Westars	8.1
Steals per game	Leroy Loggins	Brisbane Bullets	90 stls
Blocks per game	Willie Simmons	Coburg Giants	98 blks
Field goal percentage	Murray Shiels	Hobart Devils	57.3%
Three-point percentage	Wayne Burden	Sydney Supersonics	47.8%
Free throw percentage	Dane Suttle	Geelong Supercats	89.3%

== NBL awards ==
- Most Valuable Player: Leroy Loggins, Brisbane Bullets
- Most Valuable Player Grand Final: Mark Davis, Adelaide 36ers
- Rookie of the Year: Steve Lunardon, Nunawading Spectres
- Coach of the Year: Ken Cole, Adelaide 36ers

== All NBL Team ==
#	Player	Team
PG	Steve Carfino	Hobart Devils
SG	Andrew Gaze	Melbourne Tigers
SF	Leroy Loggins	Brisbane Bullets
PF	Jim Foster	Coburg Giants
C	Mark Davis	Adelaide 36ers
