= 1985 NBL season =

- League: National Basketball League
- Sport: Basketball
- Duration: 12 April – 24 August 1985; 31 August 1985 (semi-finals); 7 September 1985 (Grand Final)
- Teams: 14
- TV partner: ABC

Regular season
- Season champions: Brisbane Bullets
- Season MVP: Ray Borner (Coburg)
- Top scorer: Kendal Pinder (Sydney)

Finals
- Champions: Brisbane Bullets (1st title)
- Runners-up: Adelaide 36ers

NBL seasons
- ← 1984 1986 →

The 1985 NBL season was the seventh season of competition since its establishment in 1979. A total of 14 teams contested the league.

== Regular season ==
The 1985 regular season took place over 18 rounds between 12 April 1985 and 18 August 1985.

=== Round 1 ===
Date	Home	Score	Away	Venue	Crowd	Box Score
12/04/1985	Perth Wildcats	100–93	Brisbane Bullets	Perry Lakes Basketball Stadium	N/A	boxscore
12/04/1985	Sydney SuperSonics	88–108	Canberra Cannons	State Sports Centre	N/A	boxscore
13/04/1985	Adelaide 36ers	90–88	Brisbane Bullets	Apollo Entertainment Centre	N/A	boxscore
13/04/1985	Hobart Devils	96–109	Coburg Giants	Kingsborough Sports Centre	N/A	boxscore
13/04/1985	Geelong Cats	128–91	Melbourne Tigers	Corio Leisure Centre	N/A	boxscore
13/04/1985	Nunawading Spectres	109–96	Bankstown Bruins	Burwood Stadium	N/A	boxscore
13/04/1985	Canberra Cannons	93–94	St. Kilda Saints	AIS Arena	N/A	boxscore
13/04/1985	Newcastle Falcons	121–102	Sydney SuperSonics	Newcastle Sports Entertainment Centre	N/A	boxscore
14/04/1985	Melbourne Tigers	87–89	Brisbane Bullets	Albert Park Basketball Stadium	N/A	boxscore
14/04/1985	St. Kilda Saints	95–120	Coburg Giants	Albert Park Basketball Stadium	N/A	boxscore
14/04/1985	Illawarra Hawks	112–116	Sydney SuperSonics	Beaton Park Stadium	N/A	boxscore

=== Round 2 ===
Date	Home	Score	Away	Venue	Crowd	Box Score
19/04/1985	Perth Wildcats	117–94	Melbourne Tigers	Perry Lakes Basketball Stadium	N/A	boxscore
19/04/1985	Geelong Cats	109–125	Adelaide 36ers	Corio Leisure Centre	N/A	boxscore
19/04/1985	Illawarra Hawks	111–110	Brisbane Bullets	Beaton Park Stadium	N/A	boxscore
19/04/1985	Bankstown Bruins	89–92	Canberra Cannons	State Sports Centre	N/A	boxscore
20/04/1985	Hobart Devils	106–139	Geelong Cats	Kingsborough Sports Centre	N/A	boxscore
20/04/1985	Canberra Cannons	92–93	Nunawading Spectres	AIS Arena	N/A	boxscore
20/04/1985	Sydney SuperSonics	116–106	Coburg Giants	State Sports Centre	N/A	boxscore
20/04/1985	Newcastle Falcons	74–104	Brisbane Bullets	Newcastle Sports Entertainment Centre	N/A	boxscore
21/04/1985	Adelaide 36ers	116–82	Melbourne Tigers	Apollo Entertainment Centre	N/A	boxscore
21/04/1985	Coburg Giants	89–86	Nunawading Spectres	Melbourne Sports and Entertainment Centre	N/A	boxscore
21/04/1985	St. Kilda Saints	96–107	Geelong Cats	Melbourne Sports and Entertainment Centre	N/A	boxscore

=== Round 3 ===
Date	Home	Score	Away	Venue	Crowd	Box Score
26/04/1985	Illawarra Hawks	96–100	Perth Wildcats	Beaton Park Stadium	N/A	boxscore
26/04/1985	Hobart Devils	94–91	St. Kilda Saints	Kingsborough Sports Centre	N/A	boxscore
26/04/1985	Sydney SuperSonics	114–113	Adelaide 36ers	State Sports Centre	N/A	boxscore
27/04/1985	Canberra Cannons	119–73	Illawarra Hawks	AIS Arena	N/A	boxscore
27/04/1985	Melbourne Tigers	88–118	Coburg Giants	Albert Park Basketball Stadium	N/A	boxscore
27/04/1985	Brisbane Bullets	118–97	Adelaide 36ers	Auchenflower Stadium	N/A	boxscore
27/04/1985	Nunawading Spectres	85–79	St. Kilda Saints	Burwood Stadium	N/A	boxscore
27/04/1985	Newcastle Falcons	115–107	Perth Wildcats	Newcastle Sports Entertainment Centre	N/A	boxscore
27/04/1985	Bankstown Bruins	107–103	Geelong Cats	State Sports Centre	N/A	boxscore
28/04/1985	Coburg Giants	124–108	Adelaide 36ers	Ken Watson Stadium	N/A	boxscore

=== Round 4 ===
Date	Home	Score	Away	Venue	Crowd	Box Score
3/05/1985	Perth Wildcats	112–94	Bankstown Bruins	Perry Lakes Basketball Stadium	N/A	boxscore
3/05/1985	Hobart Devils	89–93	Newcastle Falcons	Kingsborough Sports Centre	N/A	boxscore
3/05/1985	Coburg Giants	106–114	Canberra Cannons	Ken Watson Stadium	N/A	boxscore
3/05/1985	Sydney SuperSonics	97–125	Brisbane Bullets	State Sports Centre	N/A	boxscore
4/05/1985	Adelaide 36ers	117–110	Bankstown Bruins	Apollo Entertainment Centre	N/A	boxscore
4/05/1985	Geelong Cats	87–89	Canberra Cannons	Corio Leisure Centre	N/A	boxscore
4/05/1985	Nunawading Spectres	89–107	Newcastle Falcons	Albert Park Basketball Stadium	N/A	boxscore
4/05/1985	Brisbane Bullets	117–71	Melbourne Tigers	Auchenflower Stadium	N/A	boxscore
5/05/1985	Melbourne Tigers	68–76	Canberra Cannons	Albert Park Basketball Stadium	N/A	boxscore
5/05/1985	St. Kilda Saints	130–129	Newcastle Falcons	Swan Hill Stadium	N/A	boxscore

=== Round 5 ===
Date	Home	Score	Away	Venue	Crowd	Box Score
10/05/1985	Melbourne Tigers	63–111	Sydney SuperSonics	Albert Park Basketball Stadium	N/A	boxscore
10/05/1985	Illawarra Hawks	93–94	Canberra Cannons	Beaton Park Stadium	N/A	boxscore
11/05/1985	Adelaide 36ers	114–96	Perth Wildcats	Apollo Entertainment Centre	N/A	boxscore
11/05/1985	Geelong Cats	116–91	Coburg Giants	Corio Leisure Centre	N/A	boxscore
11/05/1985	Nunawading Spectres	122–105	Sydney SuperSonics	Burwood Stadium	N/A	boxscore
11/05/1985	Newcastle Falcons	119–102	Hobart Devils	Newcastle Sports Entertainment Centre	N/A	boxscore
11/05/1985	Brisbane Bullets	72–82	Canberra Cannons	Sleeman Sports Centre	N/A	boxscore
12/05/1985	St. Kilda Saints	112–106	Sydney SuperSonics	Ballarat Stadium	N/A	boxscore
12/05/1985	Coburg Giants	123–110	Perth Wildcats	Ken Watson Stadium	N/A	boxscore

=== Round 6 ===
Date	Home	Score	Away	Venue	Crowd	Box Score
17/05/1985	Perth Wildcats	81–87	Nunawading Spectres	Perry Lakes Basketball Stadium	N/A	boxscore
17/05/1985	Hobart Devils	93–127	Brisbane Bullets	Kingsborough Sports Centre	N/A	boxscore
17/05/1985	Sydney SuperSonics	100–118	Geelong Cats	State Sports Centre	N/A	boxscore
17/05/1985	Illawarra Hawks	103–95	Bankstown Bruins	Beaton Park Stadium	N/A	boxscore
17/05/1985	Newcastle Falcons	114–105	Coburg Giants	Newcastle Sports Entertainment Centre	N/A	boxscore
18/05/1985	Adelaide 36ers	111–93	Nunawading Spectres	Apollo Entertainment Centre	N/A	boxscore
18/05/1985	Geelong Cats	107–91	Bankstown Bruins	Ballarat Stadium	N/A	boxscore
18/05/1985	Melbourne Tigers	97–88	Hobart Devils	Albert Park Basketball Stadium	N/A	boxscore
18/05/1985	Canberra Cannons	99–104	Coburg Giants	AIS Arena	N/A	boxscore
19/05/1985	St. Kilda Saints	96–124	Brisbane Bullets	Albert Park Basketball Stadium	N/A	boxscore

=== Round 7 ===
Date	Home	Score	Away	Venue	Crowd	Box Score
24/05/1985	St. Kilda Saints	105–102	Perth Wildcats	Albert Park Basketball Stadium	N/A	boxscore
24/05/1985	Canberra Cannons	92–109	Adelaide 36ers	AIS Arena	N/A	boxscore
24/05/1985	Sydney SuperSonics	89–91	Nunawading Spectres	State Sports Centre	N/A	boxscore
24/05/1985	Newcastle Falcons	107–99	Bankstown Bruins	Newcastle Sports Entertainment Centre	N/A	boxscore
25/05/1985	Hobart Devils	104–116	Perth Wildcats	Kingsborough Sports Centre	N/A	boxscore
25/05/1985	Bankstown Bruins	88–105	Adelaide 36ers	State Sports Centre	N/A	boxscore
25/05/1985	Brisbane Bullets	91–77	Nunawading Spectres	Sleeman Sports Centre	N/A	boxscore
25/05/1985	Geelong Cats	123–92	Illawarra Hawks	Corio Leisure Centre	N/A	boxscore
26/05/1985	Coburg Giants	134–96	Illawarra Hawks	Ken Watson Stadium	N/A	boxscore
26/05/1985	Melbourne Tigers	102–123	Perth Wildcats	Albert Park Basketball Stadium	N/A	boxscore

=== Round 8 ===
Date	Home	Score	Away	Venue	Crowd	Box Score
31/05/1985	Perth Wildcats	106–99	Geelong Cats	Perry Lakes Basketball Stadium	N/A	boxscore
31/05/1985	Sydney SuperSonics	97–91	St. Kilda Saints	State Sports Centre	N/A	boxscore
31/05/1985	Illawarra Hawks	106–103	Coburg Giants	Beaton Park Stadium	N/A	boxscore
1/06/1985	Adelaide 36ers	88–92	Geelong Cats	Apollo Entertainment Centre	N/A	boxscore
1/06/1985	Nunawading Spectres	114–79	Hobart Devils	Burwood Stadium	N/A	boxscore
1/06/1985	Canberra Cannons	125–75	Melbourne Tigers	AIS Arena	N/A	boxscore
1/06/1985	Newcastle Falcons	138–101	St. Kilda Saints	Newcastle Sports Entertainment Centre	N/A	boxscore
1/06/1985	Bankstown Bruins	95–101	Illawarra Hawks	State Sports Centre	N/A	boxscore
1/06/1985	Brisbane Bullets	112–89	Coburg Giants	Sleeman Sports Centre	N/A	boxscore
2/06/1985	Geelong Cats	108–91	Hobart Devils	Corio Leisure Centre	N/A	boxscore
2/06/1985	Coburg Giants	125–76	Melbourne Tigers	Ken Watson Stadium	N/A	boxscore

=== Round 9 ===
Date	Home	Score	Away	Venue	Crowd	Box Score
7/06/1985	Perth Wildcats	133–113	Hobart Devils	Perry Lakes Basketball Stadium	N/A	boxscore
7/06/1985	Sydney SuperSonics	91–113	Newcastle Falcons	State Sports Centre	N/A	boxscore
8/06/1985	Adelaide 36ers	116–73	Hobart Devils	Apollo Entertainment Centre	N/A	boxscore
8/06/1985	Geelong Cats	95–138	Brisbane Bullets	Corio Leisure Centre	N/A	boxscore
8/06/1985	Canberra Cannons	98–95	Bankstown Bruins	AIS Arena	N/A	boxscore
8/06/1985	Illawarra Hawks	124–139	Newcastle Falcons	Beaton Park Stadium	N/A	boxscore
9/06/1985	Melbourne Tigers	104–97	Newcastle Falcons	Albert Park Basketball Stadium	N/A	boxscore
9/06/1985	Coburg Giants	144–115	Bankstown Bruins	Ken Watson Stadium	N/A	boxscore
9/06/1985	St. Kilda Saints	132–106	Hobart Devils	Albert Park Basketball Stadium	N/A	boxscore
9/06/1985	Nunawading Spectres	86–81	Brisbane Bullets	Burwood Stadium	N/A	boxscore

=== Round 10 ===
Date	Home	Score	Away	Venue	Crowd	Box Score
14/06/1985	Perth Wildcats	109–120	Coburg Giants	Perry Lakes Basketball Stadium	N/A	boxscore
14/06/1985	Illawarra Hawks	109–86	Melbourne Tigers	Beaton Park Stadium	N/A	boxscore
14/06/1985	Bankstown Bruins	105–99	Sydney SuperSonics	State Sports Centre	N/A	boxscore
15/06/1985	Adelaide 36ers	116–120	Coburg Giants	Apollo Entertainment Centre	N/A	boxscore
15/06/1985	Hobart Devils	98–117	Canberra Cannons	Kingsborough Sports Centre	N/A	boxscore
15/06/1985	Nunawading Spectres	113–94	Perth Wildcats	Burwood Stadium	N/A	boxscore
15/06/1985	Newcastle Falcons	119–89	Melbourne Tigers	Newcastle Sports Entertainment Centre	N/A	boxscore
15/06/1985	Brisbane Bullets	111–102	Sydney SuperSonics	Sleeman Sports Centre	N/A	boxscore
16/06/1985	Geelong Cats	144–122	Perth Wildcats	Corio Leisure Centre	N/A	boxscore
16/06/1985	St. Kilda Saints	99–114	Canberra Cannons	Albert Park Basketball Stadium	N/A	boxscore

=== Round 11 ===
Date	Home	Score	Away	Venue	Crowd	Box Score
18/06/1985	Canberra Cannons	112–94	Hobart Devils	AIS Arena	N/A	boxscore
21/06/1985	Perth Wildcats	90–91	Canberra Cannons	Perry Lakes Basketball Stadium	N/A	boxscore
21/06/1985	Illawarra Hawks	90–121	Geelong Cats	Beaton Park Stadium	N/A	boxscore
21/06/1985	Bankstown Bruins	108–113	Newcastle Falcons	State Sports Centre	N/A	boxscore
22/06/1985	Adelaide 36ers	123–105	Canberra Cannons	Apollo Entertainment Centre	N/A	boxscore
22/06/1985	Sydney SuperSonics	136–102	Hobart Devils	State Sports Centre	N/A	boxscore
22/06/1985	Newcastle Falcons	115–99	Geelong Cats	Newcastle Sports Entertainment Centre	N/A	boxscore
22/06/1985	Brisbane Bullets	141–79	Illawarra Hawks	Sleeman Sports Centre	N/A	boxscore
22/06/1985	Melbourne Tigers	73–107	Nunawading Spectres	Albert Park Basketball Stadium	N/A	boxscore
23/06/1985	Coburg Giants	121–117	Hobart Devils	Ken Watson Stadium	N/A	boxscore
23/06/1985	St. Kilda Saints	114–99	Nunawading Spectres	Albert Park Basketball Stadium	N/A	boxscore

=== Round 12 ===
Date	Home	Score	Away	Venue	Crowd	Box Score
5/07/1985	Perth Wildcats	107–120	Newcastle Falcons	Perry Lakes Basketball Stadium	N/A	boxscore
5/07/1985	Geelong Cats	134–82	Sydney SuperSonics	Corio Leisure Centre	N/A	boxscore
6/07/1985	Adelaide 36ers	143–106	Newcastle Falcons	Apollo Entertainment Centre	N/A	boxscore
6/07/1985	Hobart Devils	106–105	Sydney SuperSonics	Kingsborough Sports Centre	N/A	boxscore
6/07/1985	Nunawading Spectres	106–82	Coburg Giants	Burwood Stadium	N/A	boxscore
6/07/1985	Melbourne Tigers	105–116	Bankstown Bruins	Albert Park Basketball Stadium	N/A	boxscore
6/07/1985	Canberra Cannons	109–100	Geelong Cats	AIS Arena	N/A	boxscore
6/07/1985	Brisbane Bullets	97–95	St. Kilda Saints	Auchenflower Stadium	N/A	boxscore
7/07/1985	Coburg Giants	144–102	Sydney SuperSonics	Ken Watson Stadium	N/A	boxscore
14/07/1985	Illawarra Hawks	108–96	St. Kilda Saints	Beaton Park Stadium	N/A	boxscore
17/07/1985	Bankstown Bruins	94–96	St. Kilda Saints	State Sports Centre	N/A	boxscore

=== Round 13 ===
Date	Home	Score	Away	Venue	Crowd	Box Score
10/07/1985	Nunawading Spectres	88–89	Canberra Cannons	Melbourne Sports and Entertainment Centre	N/A	boxscore
10/07/1985	Coburg Giants	112–118	Geelong Cats	Melbourne Sports and Entertainment Centre	N/A	boxscore
12/07/1985	St. Kilda Saints	112–144	Adelaide 36ers	Albert Park Basketball Stadium	N/A	boxscore
12/07/1985	Bankstown Bruins	91–98	Perth Wildcats	State Sports Centre	N/A	boxscore
13/07/1985	Hobart Devils	86–151	Adelaide 36ers	Kingsborough Sports Centre	N/A	boxscore
13/07/1985	Sydney SuperSonics	106–125	Illawarra Hawks	State Sports Centre	N/A	boxscore
13/07/1985	Newcastle Falcons	96–99	Canberra Cannons	Newcastle Sports Entertainment Centre	N/A	boxscore
13/07/1985	Brisbane Bullets	135–85	Perth Wildcats	Sleeman Sports Centre	N/A	boxscore
14/07/1985	Melbourne Tigers	88–109	Adelaide 36ers	Albert Park Basketball Stadium	N/A	boxscore

=== Round 14 ===
Date	Home	Score	Away	Venue	Crowd	Box Score
17/07/1985	Nunawading Spectres	91–86	Geelong Cats	Melbourne Sports and Entertainment Centre	N/A	boxscore
17/07/1985	Coburg Giants	113–107	Newcastle Falcons	Melbourne Sports and Entertainment Centre	N/A	boxscore
19/07/1985	Perth Wildcats	128–113	Illawarra Hawks	Perry Lakes Basketball Stadium	N/A	boxscore
19/07/1985	Canberra Cannons	114–102	Newcastle Falcons	AIS Arena	N/A	boxscore
19/07/1985	Bankstown Bruins	94–95	Melbourne Tigers	State Sports Centre	N/A	boxscore
20/07/1985	Adelaide 36ers	156–81	Illawarra Hawks	Apollo Entertainment Centre	N/A	boxscore
20/07/1985	Hobart Devils	71–96	Nunawading Spectres	Kingsborough Sports Centre	N/A	boxscore
20/07/1985	Sydney SuperSonics	145–106	Melbourne Tigers	State Sports Centre	N/A	boxscore
20/07/1985	Brisbane Bullets	110–96	Geelong Cats	Sleeman Sports Centre	N/A	boxscore
21/07/1985	St. Kilda Saints	92–93	Illawarra Hawks	Albert Park Basketball Stadium	N/A	boxscore

=== Round 15 ===
Date	Home	Score	Away	Venue	Crowd	Box Score
26/07/1985	Hobart Devils	106–113	Melbourne Tigers	Kingsborough Sports Centre	N/A	boxscore
26/07/1985	Sydney SuperSonics	138–112	Perth Wildcats	State Sports Centre	N/A	boxscore
26/07/1985	Illawarra Hawks	113–128	Adelaide 36ers	Beaton Park Stadium	N/A	boxscore
27/07/1985	Geelong Cats	115–106	St. Kilda Saints	Corio Leisure Centre	N/A	boxscore
27/07/1985	Nunawading Spectres	104–83	Melbourne Tigers	Burwood Stadium	N/A	boxscore
27/07/1985	Canberra Cannons	112–90	Perth Wildcats	AIS Arena	N/A	boxscore
27/07/1985	Newcastle Falcons	121–139	Adelaide 36ers	Newcastle Sports Entertainment Centre	N/A	boxscore
27/07/1985	Brisbane Bullets	90–63	Bankstown Bruins	Sleeman Sports Centre	N/A	boxscore
28/07/1985	St. Kilda Saints	109–92	Melbourne Tigers	Albert Park Basketball Stadium	N/A	boxscore
28/07/1985	Bankstown Bruins	89–96	Nunawading Spectres	State Sports Centre	N/A	boxscore

=== Round 16 ===
Date	Home	Score	Away	Venue	Crowd	Box Score
2/08/1985	Perth Wildcats	110–95	St. Kilda Saints	Perry Lakes Basketball Stadium	N/A	boxscore
2/08/1985	Illawarra Hawks	130–104	Hobart Devils	Beaton Park Stadium	N/A	boxscore
2/08/1985	Bankstown Bruins	97–113	Coburg Giants	State Sports Centre	N/A	boxscore
3/08/1985	Adelaide 36ers	144–109	St. Kilda Saints	Apollo Entertainment Centre	N/A	boxscore
3/08/1985	Geelong Cats	98–99	Nunawading Spectres	Corio Leisure Centre	N/A	boxscore
3/08/1985	Canberra Cannons	107–110	Sydney SuperSonics	AIS Arena	N/A	boxscore
3/08/1985	Newcastle Falcons	112–110	Illawarra Hawks	Newcastle Sports Entertainment Centre	N/A	boxscore
3/08/1985	Brisbane Bullets	132–96	Hobart Devils	Sleeman Sports Centre	N/A	boxscore
4/08/1985	Melbourne Tigers	122–107	Illawarra Hawks	Albert Park Basketball Stadium	N/A	boxscore
4/08/1985	Nunawading Spectres	111–127	Adelaide 36ers	Burwood Stadium	N/A	boxscore
4/08/1985	Bankstown Bruins	125–87	Hobart Devils	State Sports Centre	N/A	boxscore

=== Round 17 ===
Date	Home	Score	Away	Venue	Crowd	Box Score
9/08/1985	Perth Wildcats	142–122	Sydney SuperSonics	Perry Lakes Basketball Stadium	N/A	boxscore
9/08/1985	Illawarra Hawks	109–111	Nunawading Spectres	Beaton Park Stadium	N/A	boxscore
9/08/1985	Bankstown Bruins	86–95	Brisbane Bullets	State Sports Centre	N/A	boxscore
10/08/1985	Adelaide 36ers	155–136	Sydney SuperSonics	Apollo Entertainment Centre	N/A	boxscore
10/08/1985	Hobart Devils	101–108	Bankstown Bruins	Kingsborough Sports Centre	N/A	boxscore
10/08/1985	Melbourne Tigers	111–118	Geelong Cats	Albert Park Basketball Stadium	N/A	boxscore
10/08/1985	Newcastle Falcons	76–94	Nunawading Spectres	Newcastle Sports Entertainment Centre	N/A	boxscore
11/08/1985	Coburg Giants	121–106	Brisbane Bullets	Ken Watson Stadium	N/A	boxscore
11/08/1985	St. Kilda Saints	119–87	Bankstown Bruins	Albert Park Basketball Stadium	N/A	boxscore

=== Round 18 ===
Date	Home	Score	Away	Venue	Crowd	Box Score
16/08/1985	Perth Wildcats	126–111	Adelaide 36ers	Perry Lakes Basketball Stadium	N/A	boxscore
16/08/1985	Geelong Cats	111–116	Newcastle Falcons	Corio Leisure Centre	N/A	boxscore
16/08/1985	Sydney SuperSonics	89–90	Bankstown Bruins	State Sports Centre	N/A	boxscore
16/08/1985	Canberra Cannons	65–103	Brisbane Bullets	AIS Arena	N/A	boxscore
17/08/1985	Hobart Devils	117–119	Illawarra Hawks	Kingsborough Sports Centre	N/A	boxscore
17/08/1985	Melbourne Tigers	101–130	St. Kilda Saints	Albert Park Basketball Stadium	N/A	boxscore
17/08/1985	Brisbane Bullets	123–95	Newcastle Falcons	Sleeman Sports Centre	N/A	boxscore
18/08/1985	Nunawading Spectres	127–97	Illawarra Hawks	Burwood Stadium	N/A	boxscore
18/08/1985	Coburg Giants	111–105	St. Kilda Saints	Ken Watson Stadium	N/A	boxscore

== Ladder ==
Pos	1985 NBL season											
Pos	Team	Pld	W	L	PCT	Last 5	Streak	Home	Away	PF	PA	PP
1	Brisbane Bullets^{1}	26	20	6	76.92%	4–1	W2	12–1	8–5	2832	2328	121.65%
2	Adelaide 36ers^{1}	26	20	6	76.92%	4–1	L1	11–2	9–4	3155	2693	117.16%
3	Nunawading Spectres^{2}	26	19	7	73.08%	4–1	W3	10–3	9–4	2574	2388	107.79%
4	Canberra Cannons^{2}	26	19	7	73.08%	3–2	L2	7–6	12–1	2607	2439	106.89%
5	Coburg Giants	26	18	8	69.23%	4–1	W4	11–2	7–6	2947	2730	107.95%
6	Newcastle Falcons	26	16	10	61.54%	2–3	L1	9–4	7–6	2864	2796	102.43%
7	Geelong Cats	26	15	11	57.69%	2–3	L1	8–5	7–6	2871	2674	107.37%
8	Perth Wildcats	26	13	13	50.00%	3–2	W3	9–4	4–9	2816	2844	99.02%
9	Illawarra Hawks^{3}	26	10	16	38.46%	1–4	L1	6–7	4–9	2690	2975	90.42%
10	St. Kilda Saints^{3}	26	10	16	38.46%	2–3	L1	7–6	3–10	2699	2810	96.05%
11	Sydney Supersonics	26	9	17	34.62%	2–3	L3	6–7	3–10	2804	2934	95.57%
12	Bankstown Bruins	26	6	20	23.08%	3–2	W1	3–10	3–10	2527	2694	93.80%
13	Melbourne Tigers	26	5	21	19.23%	1–4	L2	3–10	2–11	2362	2903	81.36%
14	Hobart Devils	26	2	24	07.69%	0–5	L8	2–11	0–13	2519	3059	82.35%

Updated to match(es) played on 18 August 1985. Source: NBL.com.au

The NBL tie-breaker system as outlined in the NBL Rules and Regulations states that in the case of an identical win–loss record, the results in games played between the teams will determine order of seeding.

^{1}Head-to-Head between Brisbane Bullets and Adelaide 36ers (1-1). Brisbane Bullets won For and Against (+19).

^{2}Head-to-Head between Nunawading Spectres and Canberra Cannons (1-1) & For and Against (0). Nunawading Spectres won Overall Points Percentage (+0.90%).

^{3}Illawarra Hawks won Head-to-Head (2-0).

== Finals ==
=== Playoff bracket ===
Elimination Finals
4	Canberra Cannons	110
5	Coburg Giants	87
3	Nunawading Spectres	97
6	Newcastle Falcons	103

Semifinals
1	Brisbane Bullets	93
4	Canberra Cannons	76
2	Adelaide 36ers	151
6	Newcastle Falcons	103

Grand Final
1	Brisbane Bullets	121
2	Adelaide 36ers	95

There were two Elimination Finals, two Semifinals, and then one Grand Final. All three of these finals were sudden death. The top two teams of the regular season, the Brisbane Bullets and Adelaide 36ers, automatically qualified to host their respective Semifinals.

=== Elimination Finals ===
Date	Home	Score	Away	Venue	Crowd	Box Score
24/08/1985	Canberra Cannons	110–87	Coburg Giants	AIS Arena	N/A	boxscore
24/08/1985	Nunawading Spectres	97–103	Newcastle Falcons	Melbourne Sports and Entertainment Centre	N/A	boxscore

=== Semifinals ===
Date	Home	Score	Away	Venue	Crowd	Box Score
31/08/1985	Brisbane Bullets	93–76	Canberra Cannons	Sleeman Sports Centre	N/A	boxscore
31/08/1985	Adelaide 36ers	151–103	Newcastle Falcons	Apollo Entertainment Centre	N/A	boxscore

=== Grand Final ===
Date	Home	Score	Away	Venue	Crowd	Box Score
7/09/1985	Brisbane Bullets	121–95	Adelaide 36ers	Sleeman Sports Centre	N/A	boxscore

== 1985 NBL statistics leaders ==
Category	Player	Team	Stat
Points per game	Kendal Pinder	Sydney Supersonics	33.5
Rebounds per game	Kendal Pinder	Sydney Supersonics	17.8
Assists per game	Gordie McLeod	Illawarra Hawks	10.2
Steals per game	Leroy Loggins	Brisbane Bullets	3.7
Blocks per game	Andy Campbell	Canberra Cannons	3.5
Free throw percentage	Jim Slacke	Illawarra Hawks	87.2%

== NBL awards ==
- Most Valuable Player: Ray Borner, Coburg Giants
- Rookie of the Year: Mike McKay, Adelaide 36ers
- Coach of the Year: Bob Turner, Canberra Cannons

== All NBL Team ==
#	Player	Team
PG	Phil Smyth	Canberra Cannons
SG	Al Green	Adelaide 36ers
SF	Leroy Loggins	Brisbane Bullets
PF	Kendal Pinder	Sydney Supersonics
C	Ray Borner	Coburg Giants
