= 1983 NBL season =

- League: National Basketball League
- Sport: Basketball
- Duration: 10 February – 18 June 1983 (Regular season); 23 June – 4 July 1983 (Finals)
- Games: 22
- Teams: 16
- TV partner: ABC

Regular season
- Season champions: Sydney Supersonics (Eastern); Geelong Cats (Western)
- Season MVP: Owen Wells (Sydney)
- Top scorer: Mike Jones (Illawarra)

Finals
- Champions: Canberra Cannons (1st title)
- Runners-up: West Adelaide Bearcats

NBL seasons
- ← 1982 1984 →

The 1983 NBL season was the fifth season of the National Basketball League (NBL). The regular season began on 10 February and ended on 18 June. The finals began on 23 June with the divisional finals before concluding on 4 July with the NBL Grand Final.

== Regular season ==
The 1983 regular season took place over 18 rounds between 10 February 1983 and 18 June 1983. Each team played 22 games, against every opponent in their own division twice and against every opponent in the other division once.

=== Round 1 ===
| Date | Home | Score | Away | Venue | Crowd | Box Score |
|---|---|---|---|---|---|---|
| 10/02/1983 | St. Kilda Saints | 84–75 | Frankston Bears | Albert Park Basketball Stadium | N/A | boxscore |
| 12/02/1983 | Westate Wildcats | 76–93 | Frankston Bears | Perry Lakes Basketball Stadium | N/A | boxscore |
| 12/02/1983 | Hobart Devils | 85–40 | Devonport Warriors | Kingsborough Sports Centre | N/A | boxscore |
| 12/02/1983 | Canberra Cannons | 107–86 | Adelaide 36ers | AIS Arena | N/A | boxscore |
| 12/02/1983 | Newcastle Falcons | 113–95 | Illawarra Hawks | Newcastle Sports Entertainment Centre | N/A | boxscore |
| 12/02/1983 | West Adelaide Bearcats | 107–75 | Brisbane Bullets | Apollo Entertainment Centre | N/A | boxscore |
| 13/02/1983 | Nunawading Spectres | 114–52 | Devonport Warriors | Burwood Stadium | N/A | boxscore |
| 13/02/1983 | Bankstown Bruins | 90–81 | Adelaide 36ers | State Sports Centre | N/A | boxscore |
| 13/02/1983 | Sydney SuperSonics | 89–71 | Illawarra Hawks | Alexandria Stadium | N/A | boxscore |
| 13/02/1983 | Coburg Giants | 73–70 | Brisbane Bullets | Ken Watson Stadium | N/A | boxscore |

=== Round 2 ===
| Date | Home | Score | Away | Venue | Crowd | Box Score |
|---|---|---|---|---|---|---|
| 18/02/1983 | Westate Wildcats | 76–79 | Bankstown Bruins | Perry Lakes Basketball Stadium | N/A | boxscore |
| 19/02/1983 | Brisbane Bullets | 59–57 | Adelaide 36ers | Auchenflower Stadium | N/A | boxscore |
| 19/02/1983 | Coburg Giants | 81–78 | Sydney SuperSonics | Ken Watson Stadium | N/A | boxscore |
| 19/02/1983 | Devonport Warriors | 82–83 | Geelong Cats | Devonport Stadium | N/A | boxscore |
| 19/02/1983 | Hobart Devils | 87–105 | Canberra Cannons | Kingsborough Sports Centre | N/A | boxscore |
| 20/02/1983 | Nunawading Spectres | 72–66 | Canberra Cannons | Burwood Stadium | N/A | boxscore |
| 20/02/1983 | Illawarra Hawks | 87–90 | Adelaide 36ers | Beaton Park Stadium | N/A | boxscore |
| 20/02/1983 | West Adelaide Bearcats | 78–71 | Sydney SuperSonics | Apollo Entertainment Centre | N/A | boxscore |
| 20/02/1983 | Frankston Bears | 82–86 | Geelong Cats | Frankston Stadium | N/A | boxscore |
| 20/02/1983 | St. Kilda Saints | 79–70 | Bankstown Bruins | Albert Park Basketball Stadium | N/A | boxscore |

=== Round 3 ===
| Date | Home | Score | Away | Venue | Crowd | Box Score |
|---|---|---|---|---|---|---|
| 25/02/1983 | Westate Wildcats | 104–94 | Hobart Devils | Perry Lakes Basketball Stadium | N/A | boxscore |
| 26/02/1983 | Devonport Warriors | 71–88 | Newcastle Falcons | Devonport Stadium | N/A | boxscore |
| 26/02/1983 | Adelaide 36ers | 99–103 | Coburg Giants | Apollo Entertainment Centre | N/A | boxscore |
| 26/02/1983 | Canberra Cannons | 103–82 | West Adelaide Bearcats | AIS Arena | N/A | boxscore |
| 27/02/1983 | St. Kilda Saints | 84–83 | Hobart Devils | Albert Park Basketball Stadium | N/A | boxscore |
| 27/02/1983 | Brisbane Bullets | 53–54 | Sydney SuperSonics | Auchenflower Stadium | N/A | boxscore |
| 27/02/1983 | Frankston Bears | 95–92 | Newcastle Falcons | Frankston Stadium | N/A | boxscore |
| 27/02/1983 | Geelong Cats | 77–70 | Coburg Giants | Corio Leisure Centre | N/A | boxscore |
| 27/02/1983 | Bankstown Bruins | 80–95 | West Adelaide Bearcats | Bankstown Basketball Stadium | N/A | boxscore |

=== Round 4 ===
| Date | Home | Score | Away | Venue | Crowd | Box Score |
|---|---|---|---|---|---|---|
| 5/03/1983 | Illawarra Hawks | 71–91 | Sydney SuperSonics | Beaton Park Stadium | N/A | boxscore |
| 5/03/1983 | Newcastle Falcons | 113–75 | Hobart Devils | Newcastle Sports Entertainment Centre | N/A | boxscore |
| 5/03/1983 | Devonport Warriors | 71–95 | Brisbane Bullets | Devonport Stadium | N/A | boxscore |
| 5/03/1983 | West Adelaide Bearcats | 82–83 | Nunawading Spectres | Apollo Entertainment Centre | N/A | boxscore |
| 5/03/1983 | Geelong Cats | 80–74 | Westate Wildcats | Corio Leisure Centre | N/A | boxscore |
| 5/03/1983 | Canberra Cannons | 111–103 | St. Kilda Saints | AIS Arena | N/A | boxscore |
| 6/03/1983 | Sydney SuperSonics | 84–74 | Hobart Devils | Alexandria Stadium | N/A | boxscore |
| 6/03/1983 | Frankston Bears | 73–69 | Brisbane Bullets | Frankston Stadium | N/A | boxscore |
| 6/03/1983 | Coburg Giants | 76–77 | Nunawading Spectres | Ken Watson Stadium | N/A | boxscore |
| 6/03/1983 | Adelaide 36ers | 102–91 | Westate Wildcats | Forestville Stadium | N/A | boxscore |
| 6/03/1983 | Bankstown Bruins | 82–79 | St. Kilda Saints | Bankstown Basketball Stadium | N/A | boxscore |

=== Round 5 ===
| Date | Home | Score | Away | Venue | Crowd | Box Score |
|---|---|---|---|---|---|---|
| 11/03/1983 | Westate Wildcats | 85–84 | Illawarra Hawks | Perry Lakes Basketball Stadium | N/A | boxscore |
| 12/03/1983 | Hobart Devils | 70–71 | Brisbane Bullets | Kingsborough Sports Centre | N/A | boxscore |
| 12/03/1983 | Newcastle Falcons | 89–86 | Frankston Bears | Newcastle Sports Entertainment Centre | N/A | boxscore |
| 12/03/1983 | Coburg Giants | 102–76 | Devonport Warriors | Ken Watson Stadium | N/A | boxscore |
| 12/03/1983 | Adelaide 36ers | 93–92 | Canberra Cannons | Apollo Entertainment Centre | N/A | boxscore |
| 13/03/1983 | Nunawading Spectres | 87–72 | Brisbane Bullets | Burwood Stadium | N/A | boxscore |
| 13/03/1983 | St. Kilda Saints | 99–81 | Illawarra Hawks | Albert Park Basketball Stadium | N/A | boxscore |
| 13/03/1983 | Sydney SuperSonics | 93–83 | Frankston Bears | Alexandria Stadium | N/A | boxscore |
| 13/03/1983 | West Adelaide Bearcats | 101–53 | Devonport Warriors | Apollo Entertainment Centre | N/A | boxscore |
| 13/03/1983 | Geelong Cats | 68–67 | Canberra Cannons | Corio Leisure Centre | N/A | boxscore |

=== Round 6 ===
| Date | Home | Score | Away | Venue | Crowd | Box Score |
|---|---|---|---|---|---|---|
| 18/03/1983 | Westate Wildcats | 83–88 | Geelong Cats | Perry Lakes Basketball Stadium | N/A | boxscore |
| 19/03/1983 | Newcastle Falcons | 94–98 | West Adelaide Bearcats | Newcastle Sports Entertainment Centre | N/A | boxscore |
| 19/03/1983 | Nunawading Spectres | 111–68 | Adelaide 36ers | Burwood Stadium | N/A | boxscore |
| 19/03/1983 | Devonport Warriors | 80–93 | Canberra Cannons | Devonport Stadium | N/A | boxscore |
| 19/03/1983 | Illawarra Hawks | 71–82 | Bankstown Bruins | Beaton Park Stadium | N/A | boxscore |
| 20/03/1983 | Hobart Devils | 85–103 | Adelaide 36ers | Kingsborough Sports Centre | N/A | boxscore |
| 20/03/1983 | Sydney SuperSonics | 97–73 | West Adelaide Bearcats | Alexandria Stadium | N/A | boxscore |
| 20/03/1983 | St. Kilda Saints | 79–98 | Geelong Cats | Albert Park Basketball Stadium | N/A | boxscore |
| 20/03/1983 | Frankston Bears | 69–89 | Canberra Cannons | Frankston Stadium | N/A | boxscore |
| 20/03/1983 | Brisbane Bullets | 70–66 | Bankstown Bruins | Auchenflower Stadium | N/A | boxscore |

=== Round 7 ===
| Date | Home | Score | Away | Venue | Crowd | Box Score |
|---|---|---|---|---|---|---|
| 25/03/1983 | Bankstown Bruins | 70–77 | Sydney SuperSonics | Bankstown Basketball Stadium | N/A | boxscore |
| 26/03/1983 | Hobart Devils | 84–107 | St. Kilda Saints | Kingsborough Sports Centre | N/A | boxscore |
| 26/03/1983 | Canberra Cannons | 64–88 | Sydney SuperSonics | AIS Arena | N/A | boxscore |
| 26/03/1983 | Adelaide 36ers | 114–95 | Newcastle Falcons | Apollo Entertainment Centre | N/A | boxscore |
| 26/03/1983 | Devonport Warriors | 71–88 | Coburg Giants | Devonport Stadium | N/A | boxscore |
| 26/03/1983 | Illawarra Hawks | 109–126 | West Adelaide Bearcats | Beaton Park Stadium | N/A | boxscore |
| 27/03/1983 | Nunawading Spectres | 80–81 | St. Kilda Saints | Burwood Stadium | N/A | boxscore |
| 27/03/1983 | Geelong Cats | 83–86 | Newcastle Falcons | Corio Leisure Centre | N/A | boxscore |
| 27/03/1983 | Frankston Bears | 72–84 | Coburg Giants | Frankston Stadium | N/A | boxscore |
| 27/03/1983 | Brisbane Bullets | 79–81 | West Adelaide Bearcats | Auchenflower Stadium | N/A | boxscore |

=== Round 8 ===
| Date | Home | Score | Away | Venue | Crowd | Box Score |
|---|---|---|---|---|---|---|
| 8/04/1983 | Adelaide 36ers | 95–93 | Nunawading Spectres | Apollo Entertainment Centre | N/A | boxscore |
| 9/04/1983 | Canberra Cannons | 107–71 | Hobart Devils | AIS Arena | N/A | boxscore |
| 9/04/1983 | Illawarra Hawks | 102–100 | Devonport Warriors | Beaton Park Stadium | N/A | boxscore |
| 9/04/1983 | Geelong Cats | 84–68 | Nunawading Spectres | Corio Leisure Centre | N/A | boxscore |
| 9/04/1983 | Coburg Giants | 115–98 | Westate Wildcats | Ken Watson Stadium | N/A | boxscore |
| 9/04/1983 | Newcastle Falcons | 113–95 | St. Kilda Saints | Newcastle Sports Entertainment Centre | N/A | boxscore |
| 10/04/1983 | Bankstown Bruins | 86–73 | Hobart Devils | Bankstown Basketball Stadium | N/A | boxscore |
| 10/04/1983 | Brisbane Bullets | 104–75 | Devonport Warriors | Auchenflower Stadium | N/A | boxscore |
| 10/04/1983 | West Adelaide Bearcats | 115–94 | Westate Wildcats | Apollo Entertainment Centre | N/A | boxscore |
| 10/04/1983 | Sydney SuperSonics | 93–82 | St. Kilda Saints | Alexandria Stadium | N/A | boxscore |

=== Round 9 ===
| Date | Home | Score | Away | Venue | Crowd | Box Score |
|---|---|---|---|---|---|---|
| 16/04/1983 | Newcastle Falcons | 88–100 | Sydney SuperSonics | Newcastle Sports Entertainment Centre | N/A | boxscore |
| 16/04/1983 | West Adelaide Bearcats | 100–91 | Coburg Giants | Apollo Entertainment Centre | N/A | boxscore |
| 16/04/1983 | Devonport Warriors | 75–92 | Frankston Bears | Devonport Stadium | N/A | boxscore |
| 16/04/1983 | Geelong Cats | 95–88 | Adelaide 36ers | Corio Leisure Centre | N/A | boxscore |
| 16/04/1983 | Hobart Devils | 81–73 | Nunawading Spectres | Kingsborough Sports Centre | N/A | boxscore |
| 16/04/1983 | Bankstown Bruins | 81–87 | Canberra Cannons | Bankstown Basketball Stadium | N/A | boxscore |
| 17/04/1983 | Brisbane Bullets | 87–86 | Illawarra Hawks | Auchenflower Stadium | N/A | boxscore |
| 17/04/1983 | St. Kilda Saints | 96–91 | Adelaide 36ers | Albert Park Basketball Stadium | N/A | boxscore |

=== Round 10 ===
| Date | Home | Score | Away | Venue | Crowd | Box Score |
|---|---|---|---|---|---|---|
| 22/04/1983 | Westate Wildcats | 105–87 | Devonport Warriors | Perry Lakes Basketball Stadium | N/A | boxscore |
| 23/04/1983 | Newcastle Falcons | 92–90 | Brisbane Bullets | Newcastle Sports Entertainment Centre | N/A | boxscore |
| 23/04/1983 | West Adelaide Bearcats | 116–102 | Illawarra Hawks | Apollo Entertainment Centre | N/A | boxscore |
| 23/04/1983 | Nunawading Spectres | 85–62 | Frankston Bears | Burwood Stadium | N/A | boxscore |
| 23/04/1983 | Canberra Cannons | 102–91 | Geelong Cats | AIS Arena | N/A | boxscore |
| 24/04/1983 | Hobart Devils | 80–88 | Frankston Bears | Kingsborough Sports Centre | N/A | boxscore |
| 24/04/1983 | Sydney SuperSonics | 98–74 | Brisbane Bullets | Alexandria Stadium | N/A | boxscore |
| 24/04/1983 | Coburg Giants | 109–92 | Illawarra Hawks | Ken Watson Stadium | N/A | boxscore |
| 24/04/1983 | St. Kilda Saints | 97–86 | Devonport Warriors | Albert Park Basketball Stadium | N/A | boxscore |
| 24/04/1983 | Bankstown Bruins | 74–69 | Geelong Cats | Bankstown Basketball Stadium | N/A | boxscore |

=== Round 11 ===
| Date | Home | Score | Away | Venue | Crowd | Box Score |
|---|---|---|---|---|---|---|
| 29/04/1983 | Westate Wildcats | 65–102 | Canberra Cannons | Perry Lakes Basketball Stadium | N/A | boxscore |
| 30/04/1983 | Hobart Devils | 72–73 | Bankstown Bruins | Kingsborough Sports Centre | N/A | boxscore |
| 30/04/1983 | West Adelaide Bearcats | 113–99 | Newcastle Falcons | Apollo Entertainment Centre | N/A | boxscore |
| 30/04/1983 | Illawarra Hawks | 95–115 | Geelong Cats | Beaton Park Stadium | N/A | boxscore |
| 30/04/1983 | Devonport Warriors | 85–99 | Adelaide 36ers | Devonport Stadium | N/A | boxscore |
| 1/05/1983 | Nunawading Spectres | 93–73 | Bankstown Bruins | Burwood Stadium | N/A | boxscore |
| 1/05/1983 | St. Kilda Saints | 69–67 | Canberra Cannons | Albert Park Basketball Stadium | N/A | boxscore |
| 1/05/1983 | Coburg Giants | 116–100 | Newcastle Falcons | Ken Watson Stadium | N/A | boxscore |
| 1/05/1983 | Brisbane Bullets | 58–79 | Geelong Cats | Auchenflower Stadium | N/A | boxscore |
| 1/05/1983 | Frankston Bears | 82–83 | Adelaide 36ers | Frankston Stadium | N/A | boxscore |

=== Round 12 ===
| Date | Home | Score | Away | Venue | Crowd | Box Score |
|---|---|---|---|---|---|---|
| 6/05/1983 | Westate Wildcats | 91–99 | Nunawading Spectres | Perry Lakes Basketball Stadium | N/A | boxscore |
| 7/05/1983 | Illawarra Hawks | 101–106 | Newcastle Falcons | Beaton Park Stadium | N/A | boxscore |
| 7/05/1983 | Canberra Cannons | 105–85 | Coburg Giants | AIS Arena | N/A | boxscore |
| 7/05/1983 | West Adelaide Bearcats | 98–94 | Frankston Bears | Apollo Entertainment Centre | N/A | boxscore |
| 7/05/1983 | Devonport Warriors | 71–86 | Sydney SuperSonics | Devonport Stadium | N/A | boxscore |
| 8/05/1983 | Frankston Bears | 79–89 | Sydney SuperSonics | Frankston Stadium | N/A | boxscore |
| 8/05/1983 | Brisbane Bullets | 86–95 | Newcastle Falcons | Auchenflower Stadium | N/A | boxscore |
| 8/05/1983 | Bankstown Bruins | 73–74 | Coburg Giants | Bankstown Basketball Stadium | N/A | boxscore |
| 8/05/1983 | Geelong Cats | 100–81 | West Adelaide Bearcats | Corio Leisure Centre | N/A | boxscore |
| 8/05/1983 | St. Kilda Saints | 84–91 | Nunawading Spectres | Albert Park Basketball Stadium | N/A | boxscore |

=== Round 13 ===
| Date | Home | Score | Away | Venue | Crowd | Box Score |
|---|---|---|---|---|---|---|
| 15/04/1983 | Devonport Warriors | 79–76 | Illawarra Hawks | Devonport Stadium | N/A | boxscore |
| 14/05/1983 | Frankston Bears | 108–78 | Illawarra Hawks | Frankston Stadium | N/A | boxscore |
| 14/05/1983 | Coburg Giants | 103–81 | Hobart Devils | Ken Watson Stadium | N/A | boxscore |
| 14/05/1983 | Newcastle Falcons | 89–90 | Nunawading Spectres | Newcastle Sports Entertainment Centre | N/A | boxscore |
| 14/05/1983 | Canberra Cannons | 117–84 | Westate Wildcats | AIS Arena | N/A | boxscore |
| 14/05/1983 | Adelaide 36ers | 94–93 | St. Kilda Saints | Apollo Entertainment Centre | N/A | boxscore |
| 15/05/1983 | West Adelaide Bearcats | 121–62 | Hobart Devils | Apollo Entertainment Centre | N/A | boxscore |
| 15/05/1983 | Sydney SuperSonics | 89–74 | Nunawading Spectres | Alexandria Stadium | N/A | boxscore |
| 15/05/1983 | Bankstown Bruins | 97–85 | Westate Wildcats | Bankstown Basketball Stadium | N/A | boxscore |
| 15/05/1983 | Geelong Cats | 77–79 | St. Kilda Saints | Corio Leisure Centre | N/A | boxscore |

=== Round 14 ===
| Date | Home | Score | Away | Venue | Crowd | Box Score |
|---|---|---|---|---|---|---|
| 20/05/1983 | Westate Wildcats | 83–82 | Brisbane Bullets | Perry Lakes Basketball Stadium | N/A | boxscore |
| 21/05/1983 | Nunawading Spectres | 85–81 | Illawarra Hawks | Burwood Stadium | N/A | boxscore |
| 21/05/1983 | Newcastle Falcons | 97–94 | Devonport Warriors | Newcastle Sports Entertainment Centre | N/A | boxscore |
| 21/05/1983 | Geelong Cats | 78–68 | Bankstown Bruins | Corio Leisure Centre | N/A | boxscore |
| 22/05/1983 | Hobart Devils | 79–89 | Illawarra Hawks | Kingsborough Sports Centre | N/A | boxscore |
| 22/05/1983 | St. Kilda Saints | 80–83 | Brisbane Bullets | Albert Park Basketball Stadium | N/A | boxscore |
| 22/05/1983 | Sydney SuperSonics | 101–86 | Devonport Warriors | Alexandria Stadium | N/A | boxscore |
| 22/05/1983 | Coburg Giants | 84–78 | Frankston Bears | Ken Watson Stadium | N/A | boxscore |
| 22/05/1983 | Adelaide 36ers | 79–80 | Bankstown Bruins | Apollo Entertainment Centre | N/A | boxscore |

=== Round 15 ===
| Date | Home | Score | Away | Venue | Crowd | Box Score |
|---|---|---|---|---|---|---|
| 27/05/1983 | Westate Wildcats | 107–83 | Adelaide 36ers | Perry Lakes Basketball Stadium | N/A | boxscore |
| 28/05/1983 | Newcastle Falcons | 103–93 | Coburg Giants | Newcastle Sports Entertainment Centre | N/A | boxscore |
| 28/05/1983 | Hobart Devils | 72–85 | Geelong Cats | Kingsborough Sports Centre | N/A | boxscore |
| 28/05/1983 | Illawarra Hawks | 87–93 | Canberra Cannons | Beaton Park Stadium | N/A | boxscore |
| 28/05/1983 | Frankston Bears | 70–81 | Bankstown Bruins | Frankston Stadium | N/A | boxscore |
| 29/05/1983 | Nunawading Spectres | 91–100 | Geelong Cats | Burwood Stadium | N/A | boxscore |
| 29/05/1983 | Sydney SuperSonics | 93–84 | Coburg Giants | Alexandria Stadium | N/A | boxscore |
| 29/05/1983 | Adelaide 36ers | 96–93 | West Adelaide Bearcats | Apollo Entertainment Centre | N/A | boxscore |
| 29/05/1983 | Brisbane Bullets | 71–92 | Canberra Cannons | Auchenflower Stadium | N/A | boxscore |
| 29/05/1983 | Devonport Warriors | 58–78 | Bankstown Bruins | Devonport Stadium | N/A | boxscore |

=== Round 16 ===
| Date | Home | Score | Away | Venue | Crowd | Box Score |
|---|---|---|---|---|---|---|
| 3/06/1983 | Hobart Devils | 96–102 | Westate Wildcats | Kingsborough Sports Centre | N/A | boxscore |
| 4/06/1983 | Adelaide 36ers | 83–101 | Sydney SuperSonics | Apollo Entertainment Centre | N/A | boxscore |
| 4/06/1983 | Canberra Cannons | 107–87 | Newcastle Falcons | AIS Arena | N/A | boxscore |
| 4/06/1983 | Illawarra Hawks | 89–88 | Coburg Giants | Beaton Park Stadium | N/A | boxscore |
| 4/06/1983 | Frankston Bears | 85–92 | West Adelaide Bearcats | Frankston Stadium | N/A | boxscore |
| 4/06/1983 | Nunawading Spectres | 103–74 | Westate Wildcats | Burwood Stadium | N/A | boxscore |
| 5/06/1983 | Geelong Cats | 101–73 | Sydney SuperSonics | Corio Leisure Centre | N/A | boxscore |
| 5/06/1983 | Bankstown Bruins | 90–91 | Newcastle Falcons | Bankstown Basketball Stadium | N/A | boxscore |
| 5/06/1983 | Brisbane Bullets | 100–75 | Coburg Giants | Auchenflower Stadium | N/A | boxscore |
| 5/06/1983 | Devonport Warriors | 106–108 | West Adelaide Bearcats | Devonport Stadium | N/A | boxscore |
| 5/06/1983 | St. Kilda Saints | 104–84 | Westate Wildcats | Albert Park Basketball Stadium | N/A | boxscore |

=== Round 17 ===
| Date | Home | Score | Away | Venue | Crowd | Box Score |
|---|---|---|---|---|---|---|
| 11/06/1983 | Illawarra Hawks | 92–90 | Frankston Bears | Beaton Park Stadium | N/A | boxscore |
| 11/06/1983 | Geelong Cats | 110–74 | Hobart Devils | Corio Leisure Centre | N/A | boxscore |
| 11/06/1983 | Canberra Cannons | 85–86 | Nunawading Spectres | AIS Arena | N/A | boxscore |
| 11/06/1983 | Newcastle Falcons | 132–92 | Westate Wildcats | Newcastle Sports Entertainment Centre | N/A | boxscore |
| 11/06/1983 | West Adelaide Bearcats | 117–112 | St. Kilda Saints | Apollo Entertainment Centre | N/A | boxscore |
| 12/06/1983 | Brisbane Bullets | 88–79 | Frankston Bears | Auchenflower Stadium | N/A | boxscore |
| 12/06/1983 | Adelaide 36ers | 128–96 | Hobart Devils | Apollo Entertainment Centre | N/A | boxscore |
| 12/06/1983 | Bankstown Bruins | 92–83 | Nunawading Spectres | Bankstown Basketball Stadium | N/A | boxscore |
| 12/06/1983 | Sydney SuperSonics | 119–89 | Westate Wildcats | Alexandria Stadium | N/A | boxscore |
| 12/06/1983 | Coburg Giants | 95–85 | St. Kilda Saints | Ken Watson Stadium | N/A | boxscore |

=== Round 18 ===
| Date | Home | Score | Away | Venue | Crowd | Box Score |
|---|---|---|---|---|---|---|
| 18/06/1983 | Illawarra Hawks | 90–98 | Brisbane Bullets | Beaton Park Stadium | N/A | boxscore |
| 18/06/1983 | Sydney SuperSonics | 92–81 | Newcastle Falcons | Alexandria Stadium | N/A | boxscore |
| 18/06/1983 | Coburg Giants | 87–103 | West Adelaide Bearcats | Ken Watson Stadium | N/A | boxscore |
| 18/06/1983 | Frankston Bears | 74–76 | Devonport Warriors | Frankston Stadium | N/A | boxscore |
| 18/06/1983 | Adelaide 36ers | 90–106 | Geelong Cats | Apollo Entertainment Centre | N/A | boxscore |
| 18/06/1983 | Westate Wildcats | 87–100 | St. Kilda Saints | Perry Lakes Basketball Stadium | N/A | boxscore |
| 18/06/1983 | Canberra Cannons | 88–72 | Bankstown Bruins | AIS Arena | N/A | boxscore |
| 18/06/1983 | Nunawading Spectres | 126–83 | Hobart Devils | Burwood Stadium | N/A | boxscore |

== Ladder ==
Eastern Division

| Pos | 1983 NBL season | | | | | | | | | | | |
| Pos | Team | Pld | W | L | PCT | Last 5 | Streak | Home | Away | PF | PA | PP |
|---|---|---|---|---|---|---|---|---|---|---|---|---|
| 1 | Sydney Supersonics | 22 | 19 | 3 | 86.36% | 4–1 | W2 | 11–0 | 8–3 | 1956 | 1710 | 114.39% |
| 2 | West Adelaide Bearcats | 22 | 17 | 5 | 77.27% | 4–1 | W4 | 10–1 | 7–4 | 2180 | 1972 | 110.55% |
| 3 | Coburg Giants^{1} | 22 | 13 | 9 | 59.09% | 1–4 | L1 | 9–2 | 4–7 | 1976 | 1920 | 102.92% |
| 4 | Newcastle Falcons^{1} | 22 | 13 | 9 | 59.09% | 3–2 | L1 | 8–3 | 5–6 | 2143 | 2076 | 103.23% |
| 5 | Brisbane Bullets | 22 | 10 | 12 | 45.45% | 4–1 | W3 | 6–5 | 4–7 | 1734 | 1763 | 98.36% |
| 6 | Frankston Bears | 22 | 6 | 16 | 27.27% | 0–5 | L6 | 3–8 | 3–8 | 1809 | 1863 | 97.10% |
| 7 | Illawarra Hawks | 22 | 4 | 18 | 18.18% | 3–2 | L1 | 3–8 | 1–10 | 1929 | 2128 | 90.65% |
| 8 | Devonport Warriors | 22 | 2 | 20 | 09.09% | 1–4 | W1 | 1–10 | 1–10 | 1674 | 2068 | 80.95% |

Western Division

| Pos | 1983 NBL season | | | | | | | | | | | |
| Pos | Team | Pld | W | L | PCT | Last 5 | Streak | Home | Away | PF | PA | PP |
|---|---|---|---|---|---|---|---|---|---|---|---|---|
| 1 | Geelong Cats | 22 | 18 | 4 | 81.82% | 5–0 | W6 | 9–2 | 9–2 | 1953 | 1736 | 112.50% |
| 2 | Canberra Cannons | 22 | 16 | 6 | 72.73% | 4–1 | W1 | 9–2 | 7–4 | 2049 | 1777 | 115.31% |
| 3 | Nunawading Spectres | 22 | 15 | 7 | 68.18% | 3–2 | W1 | 9–2 | 6–5 | 1964 | 1760 | 111.59% |
| 4 | St. Kilda Saints^{2} | 22 | 12 | 10 | 54.55% | 2–3 | W1 | 8–3 | 4–7 | 1971 | 1942 | 101.49% |
| 5 | Bankstown Bruins^{2} | 22 | 12 | 10 | 54.55% | 3–2 | L1 | 6–5 | 6–5 | 1737 | 1728 | 100.52% |
| 6 | Adelaide 36ers | 22 | 11 | 11 | 50.00% | 2–3 | L1 | 7–4 | 4–7 | 2002 | 2047 | 97.80% |
| 7 | Westate Wildcats | 22 | 6 | 16 | 27.27% | 0–5 | L5 | 5–6 | 1–10 | 1929 | 2171 | 88.85% |
| 8 | Hobart Devils | 22 | 2 | 20 | 09.09% | 0–5 | L10 | 2–9 | 0–11 | 1757 | 2102 | 83.59% |

Updated to match(es) played on 18 June 1983. Source: NBL.com.au

The NBL tie-breaker system as outlined in the NBL Rules and Regulations states that in the case of an identical win–loss record, the results in games played between the teams will determine order of seeding.

^{1}Head-to-Head between Coburg Giants and Newcastle Falcons (1-1). Coburg Giants won For and Against (+6).

^{2}Head-to-Head between St. Kilda Saints and Bankstown Bruins (1-1). St. Kilda Saints won For and Against (+6).

== Finals ==
The NBL finals series in 1983 consisted of the divisional finals (which was a round-robin fixture for the top eight teams), two semifinal games, and one championship-deciding grand final.

=== Round Robin (East) ===
| Date | Home | Score | Away | Venue | Crowd | Box Score |
|---|---|---|---|---|---|---|
| 23/06/1983 | Coburg Giants | 79–80 | Sydney SuperSonics | Ken Watson Stadium | N/A | boxscore |
| 24/06/1983 | West Adelaide Bearcats | 93–86 | Newcastle Falcons | Apollo Entertainment Centre | N/A | boxscore |
| 25/06/1983 | Newcastle Falcons | 87–101 | Coburg Giants | Newcastle Sports Entertainment Centre | N/A | boxscore |
| 25/06/1983 | Sydney SuperSonics | 78–91 | West Adelaide Bearcats | Liverpool Stadium | N/A | boxscore |
| 26/06/1983 | Sydney SuperSonics | 101–94 | Newcastle Falcons | Liverpool Stadium | N/A | boxscore |
| 26/06/1983 | Coburg Giants | 105–104 | West Adelaide Bearcats | Liverpool Stadium | N/A | boxscore |

| Pos | Team | Pld | W | L | PF | PA | PD | Qualification |
|---|---|---|---|---|---|---|---|---|
| 1 | West Adelaide Bearcats | 3 | 2 | 1 | 288 | 269 | +19 | Qualification to Semifinals |
| 2 | Coburg Giants | 3 | 2 | 1 | 285 | 271 | +14 | Qualification to Semifinals |
| 3 | Sydney Supersonics | 3 | 2 | 1 | 259 | 264 | −5 | Eliminated |
| 4 | Newcastle Falcons | 3 | 0 | 3 | 267 | 295 | −28 | Eliminated |

Source: websites.sportstg.com/

=== Round Robin (West) ===
| Date | Home | Score | Away | Venue | Crowd | Box Score |
|---|---|---|---|---|---|---|
| 24/06/1983 | St. Kilda Saints | 94–95 | Geelong Cats | Albert Park Basketball Stadium | N/A | boxscore |
| 24/06/1983 | Canberra Cannons | 89–81 | Nunawading Spectres | AIS Arena | N/A | boxscore |
| 25/06/1983 | Geelong Cats | 81–86 | Canberra Cannons | Corio Leisure Centre | N/A | boxscore |
| 25/06/1983 | Nunawading Spectres | 109–75 | St. Kilda Saints | Burwood Stadium | N/A | boxscore |
| 26/06/1983 | Nunawading Spectres | 107–74 | Geelong Cats | Kilsyth Stadium | N/A | boxscore |
| 26/06/1983 | Canberra Cannons | 104–85 | St. Kilda Saints | Kilsyth Stadium | N/A | boxscore |

| Pos | Team | Pld | W | L | PF | PA | PD | Qualification |
|---|---|---|---|---|---|---|---|---|
| 1 | Canberra Cannons | 3 | 3 | 0 | 279 | 247 | +32 | Qualification to Semifinals |
| 2 | Nunawading Spectres | 3 | 2 | 1 | 297 | 238 | +59 | Qualification to Semifinals |
| 3 | Geelong Cats | 3 | 1 | 2 | 250 | 287 | −37 | Eliminated |
| 4 | St. Kilda Saints | 3 | 0 | 3 | 254 | 308 | −54 | Eliminated |

Source: websites.sportstg.com/

=== Round Robin results ===
Each of the top eight teams played in a three-game round robin fixture between 23 June and 26 June. The result were as follows:

==== Results ====
| Team | Record | Points differential | Semi-finals seed |
|---|---|---|---|
| Canberra Cannons | 3–0 | +32 | #1 |
| Nunawading Spectres | 2–1 | +59 | #2 |
| West Adelaide Bearcats | 2–1 | +19 | #3 |
| Coburg Giants | 2–1 | +14 | #4 |
| Sydney Supersonics | 2–1 | -5 | Eliminated |
| Geelong Cats | 1–2 | -37 | Eliminated |
| Newcastle Falcons | 0–3 | -28 | Eliminated |
| St. Kilda Saints | 0–3 | -54 | Eliminated |

=== Playoff bracket ===
Semifinals
1 | Canberra Cannons | 80
4 | Coburg Giants | 75
2 | Nunawading Spectres | 77
3 | West Adelaide Bearcats | 84

Grand Final
1 | Canberra Cannons | 75
2 | West Adelaide Bearcats | 73

=== Semifinals ===
| Date | Home | Score | Away | Venue | Crowd | Box Score |
|---|---|---|---|---|---|---|
| 1/07/1983 | Nunawading Spectres | 77–84 | West Adelaide Bearcats | Burwood Stadium | N/A | boxscore |
| 1/07/1983 | Canberra Cannons | 80–75 | Coburg Giants | Kilsyth Stadium Stadium | N/A | boxscore |

=== Grand Final ===
| Date | Home | Score | Away | Venue | Crowd | Box Score |
|---|---|---|---|---|---|---|
| 4/07/1983 | Canberra Cannons | 75–73 | West Adelaide Bearcats | Kilsyth Stadium | N/A | boxscore |

== Awards ==
=== Statistics leaders ===
| Category | Player | Team | Stat |
|---|---|---|---|
| Points | Mike Jones | Illawarra Hawks | 679 pts / 22 games |
| Rebounds per game | George Morrow | Newcastle Falcons | 15.6 rpg / 25 games |
| Steals | Phil Smyth | Canberra Cannons | 67 / 22 games |
| Blocks | James Crawford | Geelong Cats | 69 / 22 games |
| Field goal percentage | Mike Slusher | St Kilda Saints | 64.8% (96/148) |
| Free throw percentage | Michael Johnson | Newcastle Falcons | 91.8% (34/37) |

=== Regular season ===
- Most Valuable Player: Owen Wells (Sydney Supersonics)
- Rookie of the Year: Jaime Kennedy (Canberra Cannons)
- Best Defensive Player: Phil Smyth (Canberra Cannons)
- Coach of the Year: Robbie Cadee (Bankstown Bruins)
- All-NBL Team:
  - Leroy Loggins (West Adelaide Bearcats)
  - James Crawford (Geelong Cats)
  - George Morrow (Newcastle Falcons)
  - Phil Smyth (Canberra Cannons)
  - Cal Bruton (Geelong Cats)
