= Wayne Burden =

American basketball player

John Wayne Burden (born November 12 1955) is a retired American basketball player. He graduated in 1974 from William G. Enloe High School in Raleigh, North Carolina, and played one year of Division II college basketball at California State University, Chico, where he averaged 21.1 points per game. Between 1983 and 1990, he played seven seasons in the Australian NBL with the Frankston Bears (1983–84), Sydney Supersonics (1985–86), and Hobart Devils (1987–88; 1990). He led the NBL in 3-point percentage (47.8%; 34/71) during the 1986 season. After retiring from basketball he worked as a security agent.
