= 1984 NBL season =

- League: National Basketball League
- Sport: Basketball
- Duration: 3 February – 17 June 1984 (Regular season); 22 June – 1 July 1984 (Finals)
- Games: 23 (Western Division); 24 (Eastern Division)
- Teams: 17
- TV partner: ABC

Regular season
- Season champions: Brisbane Bullets (Eastern); Geelong Cats (Western)
- Season MVP: Leroy Loggins (Brisbane)
- Top scorer: Al Green (West Adelaide)

Finals
- Champions: Canberra Cannons (2nd title)
- Runners-up: Brisbane Bullets

NBL seasons
- ← 1983 1985 →

The 1984 NBL season was the sixth season of the National Basketball League (NBL). With the Melbourne Tigers joining the competition, the league's number of teams increased to 17, with nine teams in the Eastern Division and eight teams in the Western Division. The regular season began on 3 February and ended on 17 June. The finals began on 22 June with the divisional finals before concluding on 1 July with the NBL Grand Final.

== Regular season ==
=== Round 1 ===
| Date | Home | Score | Away | Venue | Crowd | Box Score |
|---|---|---|---|---|---|---|
| 3/02/1984 | Perth Wildcats | 100–120 | Adelaide 36ers | Perry Lakes Basketball Stadium | N/A | boxscore |
| 3/02/1984 | Frankston Bears | 82–102 | Brisbane Bullets | Frankston Stadium | N/A | boxscore |
| 4/02/1984 | Nunawading Spectres | 101–94 | Sydney SuperSonics | Burwood Stadium | N/A | boxscore |
| 4/02/1984 | West Adelaide Bearcats | 91–112 | Canberra Cannons | State Sports Centre | N/A | boxscore |
| 4/02/1984 | Melbourne Tigers | 70–94 | Brisbane Bullets | Albert Park Basketball Stadium | N/A | boxscore |
| 5/02/1984 | Devonport Warriors | 75–78 | Hobart Devils | Devonport Stadium | N/A | boxscore |
| 5/02/1984 | St. Kilda Saints | 93–107 | Sydney SuperSonics | Albert Park Basketball Stadium | N/A | boxscore |
| 5/02/1984 | Geelong Cats | 106–87 | Frankston Bears | Corio Leisure Centre | N/A | boxscore |
| 5/02/1984 | Coburg Giants | 110–101 | Canberra Cannons | Ken Watson Stadium | N/A | boxscore |

=== Round 2 ===
| Date | Home | Score | Away | Venue | Crowd | Box Score |
|---|---|---|---|---|---|---|
| 10/02/1984 | Frankston Bears | 91–86 | Melbourne Tigers | Frankston Stadium | N/A | boxscore |
| 10/02/1984 | Perth Wildcats | 93–103 | West Adelaide Bearcats | Perry Lakes Basketball Stadium | N/A | boxscore |
| 10/02/1984 | Canberra Cannons | 148–105 | Devonport Warriors | AIS Arena | N/A | boxscore |
| 11/02/1984 | Hobart Devils | 92–103 | Frankston Bears | Kingsborough Sports Centre | N/A | boxscore |
| 11/02/1984 | Brisbane Bullets | 115–89 | Sydney SuperSonics | Auchenflower Stadium | N/A | boxscore |
| 11/02/1984 | Bankstown Bruins | 81–91 | Newcastle Falcons | Bankstown Basketball Stadium | N/A | boxscore |
| 11/02/1984 | Geelong Cats | 117–102 | Devonport Warriors | Corio Leisure Centre | N/A | boxscore |
| 11/02/1984 | St. Kilda Saints | 115–152 | Coburg Giants | Albert Park Basketball Stadium | N/A | boxscore |
| 12/02/1984 | Nunawading Spectres | 89–119 | Coburg Giants | Burwood Stadium | N/A | boxscore |
| 12/02/1984 | Adelaide 36ers | 126–131 | West Adelaide Bearcats | Apollo Entertainment Centre | N/A | boxscore |
| 12/02/1984 | Melbourne Tigers | 88–114 | Newcastle Falcons | Albert Park Basketball Stadium | N/A | boxscore |
| 12/02/1984 | Illawarra Hawks | 119–93 | Sydney SuperSonics | Beaton Park Stadium | N/A | boxscore |
| 15/02/1984 | Newcastle Falcons | 116–82 | Sydney SuperSonics | Newcastle Sports Entertainment Centre | N/A | boxscore |

=== Round 3 ===
| Date | Home | Score | Away | Venue | Crowd | Box Score |
|---|---|---|---|---|---|---|
| 17/02/1984 | Sydney SuperSonics | 117–101 | Devonport Warriors | Alexandria Stadium | N/A | boxscore |
| 17/02/1984 | Perth Wildcats | 84–97 | Canberra Cannons | Perry Lakes Basketball Stadium | N/A | boxscore |
| 17/02/1984 | Newcastle Falcons | 107–87 | Devonport Warriors | Newcastle Sports Entertainment Centre | N/A | boxscore |
| 18/02/1984 | Illawarra Hawks | 91–104 | Brisbane Bullets | Beaton Park Stadium | N/A | boxscore |
| 18/02/1984 | Coburg Giants | 143–104 | Hobart Devils | Ken Watson Stadium | N/A | boxscore |
| 18/02/1984 | Adelaide 36ers | 101–112 | Canberra Cannons | Apollo Entertainment Centre | N/A | boxscore |
| 18/02/1984 | Nunawading Spectres | 104–116 | Geelong Cats | Burwood Stadium | N/A | boxscore |
| 18/02/1984 | Melbourne Tigers | 125–105 | Frankston Bears | Albert Park Basketball Stadium | N/A | boxscore |
| 19/02/1984 | Bankstown Bruins | 89–117 | Brisbane Bullets | Bankstown Basketball Stadium | N/A | boxscore |
| 19/02/1984 | West Adelaide Bearcats | 107–97 | Hobart Devils | State Sports Centre | N/A | boxscore |
| 19/02/1984 | St. Kilda Saints | 93–109 | Geelong Cats | Albert Park Basketball Stadium | N/A | boxscore |

=== Round 4 ===
| Date | Home | Score | Away | Venue | Crowd | Box Score |
|---|---|---|---|---|---|---|
| 24/02/1984 | Sydney SuperSonics | 92–120 | Brisbane Bullets | Alexandria Stadium | N/A | boxscore |
| 24/02/1984 | Frankston Bears | 80–78 | Bankstown Bruins | Frankston Stadium | N/A | boxscore |
| 24/02/1984 | Perth Wildcats | 87–94 | St. Kilda Saints | Perry Lakes Basketball Stadium | N/A | boxscore |
| 25/02/1984 | West Adelaide Bearcats | 144–111 | Illawarra Hawks | Apollo Entertainment Centre | N/A | boxscore |
| 25/02/1984 | Adelaide 36ers | 140–112 | St. Kilda Saints | Apollo Entertainment Centre | N/A | boxscore |
| 25/02/1984 | Newcastle Falcons | 91–80 | Brisbane Bullets | Newcastle Sports Entertainment Centre | N/A | boxscore |
| 25/02/1984 | Hobart Devils | 95–118 | Bankstown Bruins | Kingsborough Sports Centre | N/A | boxscore |
| 25/02/1984 | Canberra Cannons | 107–101 | Melbourne Tigers | AIS Arena | N/A | boxscore |
| 26/02/1984 | Coburg Giants | 137–98 | Illawarra Hawks | Ken Watson Stadium | N/A | boxscore |
| 26/02/1984 | Geelong Cats | 124–119 | Melbourne Tigers | Corio Leisure Centre | N/A | boxscore |
| 26/02/1984 | Devonport Warriors | 96–104 | Bankstown Bruins | Devonport Stadium | N/A | boxscore |

=== Round 5 ===
| Date | Home | Score | Away | Venue | Crowd | Box Score |
|---|---|---|---|---|---|---|
| 2/03/1984 | Sydney SuperSonics | 102–114 | Bankstown Bruins | Alexandria Stadium | N/A | boxscore |
| 2/03/1984 | Illawarra Hawks | 97–84 | St. Kilda Saints | Beaton Park Stadium | N/A | boxscore |
| 2/03/1984 | Frankston Bears | 100–115 | Nunawading Spectres | Frankston Stadium | N/A | boxscore |
| 2/03/1984 | Devonport Warriors | 104–128 | Adelaide 36ers | Devonport Stadium | N/A | boxscore |
| 3/03/1984 | West Adelaide Bearcats | 93–104 | Newcastle Falcons | State Sports Centre | N/A | boxscore |
| 3/03/1984 | Brisbane Bullets | 88–85 | St. Kilda Saints | Auchenflower Stadium | N/A | boxscore |
| 3/03/1984 | Bankstown Bruins | 83–106 | Nunawading Spectres | Bankstown Basketball Stadium | N/A | boxscore |
| 3/03/1984 | Canberra Cannons | 115–82 | Perth Wildcats | AIS Arena | N/A | boxscore |
| 3/03/1984 | Hobart Devils | 98–138 | Adelaide 36ers | Kingsborough Sports Centre | N/A | boxscore |
| 4/03/1984 | Coburg Giants | 129–122 | Newcastle Falcons | Ken Watson Stadium | N/A | boxscore |
| 4/03/1984 | Melbourne Tigers | 96–109 | Nunawading Spectres | Albert Park Basketball Stadium | N/A | boxscore |
| 4/03/1984 | Geelong Cats | 127–75 | Perth Wildcats | Corio Leisure Centre | N/A | boxscore |

=== Round 6 ===
| Date | Home | Score | Away | Venue | Crowd | Box Score |
|---|---|---|---|---|---|---|
| 9/03/1984 | Perth Wildcats | 92–72 | Sydney SuperSonics | Perry Lakes Basketball Stadium | N/A | boxscore |
| 9/03/1984 | Frankston Bears | 104–97 | Newcastle Falcons | Frankston Stadium | N/A | boxscore |
| 9/03/1984 | Canberra Cannons | 99–124 | Geelong Cats | AIS Arena | N/A | boxscore |
| 10/03/1984 | Adelaide 36ers | 133–123 | Sydney SuperSonics | Apollo Entertainment Centre | N/A | boxscore |
| 10/03/1984 | Nunawading Spectres | 102–105 | Newcastle Falcons | Burwood Stadium | N/A | boxscore |
| 10/03/1984 | Bankstown Bruins | 100–94 | Coburg Giants | Bankstown Basketball Stadium | N/A | boxscore |
| 10/03/1984 | Brisbane Bullets | 119–70 | West Adelaide Bearcats | Auchenflower Stadium | N/A | boxscore |
| 10/03/1984 | Hobart Devils | 115–124 | Geelong Cats | Kingsborough Sports Centre | N/A | boxscore |
| 11/03/1984 | St. Kilda Saints | 121–130 | Newcastle Falcons | Albert Park Basketball Stadium | N/A | boxscore |
| 11/03/1984 | Coburg Giants | 129–120 | Melbourne Tigers | Ken Watson Stadium | N/A | boxscore |
| 11/03/1984 | Illawarra Hawks | 113–92 | West Adelaide Bearcats | Beaton Park Stadium | N/A | boxscore |
| 11/03/1984 | Devonport Warriors | 102–123 | Geelong Cats | Devonport Stadium | N/A | boxscore |

=== Round 7 ===
| Date | Home | Score | Away | Venue | Crowd | Box Score |
|---|---|---|---|---|---|---|
| 16/03/1984 | Brisbane Bullets | 104–84 | Melbourne Tigers | Auchenflower Stadium | N/A | boxscore |
| 16/03/1984 | Perth Wildcats | 81–88 | Hobart Devils | Perry Lakes Basketball Stadium | N/A | boxscore |
| 16/03/1984 | Sydney SuperSonics | 92–120 | Canberra Cannons | Alexandria Stadium | N/A | boxscore |
| 16/03/1984 | West Adelaide Bearcats | 82–124 | Geelong Cats | Apollo Entertainment Centre | N/A | boxscore |
| 17/03/1984 | Illawarra Hawks | 102–103 | Melbourne Tigers | Beaton Park Stadium | N/A | boxscore |
| 17/03/1984 | Nunawading Spectres | 134–83 | Devonport Warriors | Burwood Stadium | N/A | boxscore |
| 17/03/1984 | Coburg Giants | 160–118 | Frankston Bears | Ken Watson Stadium | N/A | boxscore |
| 17/03/1984 | Newcastle Falcons | 117–107 | Canberra Cannons | Newcastle Sports Entertainment Centre | N/A | boxscore |
| 18/03/1984 | Bankstown Bruins | 102–97 | Melbourne Tigers | Bankstown Basketball Stadium | N/A | boxscore |
| 18/03/1984 | Adelaide 36ers | 160–127 | Hobart Devils | Apollo Entertainment Centre | N/A | boxscore |
| 18/03/1984 | St. Kilda Saints | 121–96 | Devonport Warriors | Albert Park Basketball Stadium | N/A | boxscore |

=== Round 8 ===
| Date | Home | Score | Away | Venue | Crowd | Box Score |
|---|---|---|---|---|---|---|
| 23/03/1984 | Frankston Bears | 104–98 | Illawarra Hawks | Frankston Stadium | N/A | boxscore |
| 23/03/1984 | Sydney SuperSonics | 79–128 | Melbourne Tigers | Alexandria Stadium | N/A | boxscore |
| 23/03/1984 | Adelaide 36ers | 126–103 | Perth Wildcats | Apollo Entertainment Centre | N/A | boxscore |
| 24/03/1984 | Devonport Warriors | 74–81 | Illawarra Hawks | Devonport Stadium | N/A | boxscore |
| 24/03/1984 | Canberra Cannons | 76–79 | Brisbane Bullets | AIS Arena | N/A | boxscore |
| 24/03/1984 | Newcastle Falcons | 113–94 | Melbourne Tigers | Newcastle Sports Entertainment Centre | N/A | boxscore |
| 24/03/1984 | West Adelaide Bearcats | 88–79 | Bankstown Bruins | Apollo Entertainment Centre | N/A | boxscore |
| 24/03/1984 | Nunawading Spectres | 129–88 | Perth Wildcats | Kilsyth Stadium | N/A | boxscore |
| 24/03/1984 | Hobart Devils | 85–89 | Illawarra Hawks | Kingsborough Sports Centre | N/A | boxscore |
| 24/03/1984 | Geelong Cats | 114–109 | Brisbane Bullets | Corio Leisure Centre | N/A | boxscore |
| 25/03/1984 | Coburg Giants | 147–112 | Bankstown Bruins | Ken Watson Stadium | N/A | boxscore |
| 25/03/1984 | St. Kilda Saints | 109–93 | Perth Wildcats | Albert Park Basketball Stadium | N/A | boxscore |

=== Round 9 ===
| Date | Home | Score | Away | Venue | Crowd | Box Score |
|---|---|---|---|---|---|---|
| 30/03/1984 | Sydney SuperSonics | 98–139 | Coburg Giants | Alexandria Stadium | N/A | boxscore |
| 30/03/1984 | Frankston Bears | 121–114 | Adelaide 36ers | Frankston Stadium | N/A | boxscore |
| 30/03/1984 | Illawarra Hawks | 107–103 | Perth Wildcats | Beaton Park Stadium | N/A | boxscore |
| 30/03/1984 | Newcastle Falcons | 114–111 | Coburg Giants | Newcastle Sports Entertainment Centre | N/A | boxscore |
| 31/03/1984 | Bankstown Bruins | 92–94 | Adelaide 36ers | Bankstown Basketball Stadium | N/A | boxscore |
| 31/03/1984 | Canberra Cannons | 107–105 | St. Kilda Saints | AIS Arena | N/A | boxscore |
| 31/03/1984 | Hobart Devils | 92–126 | Nunawading Spectres | Kingsborough Sports Centre | N/A | boxscore |
| 31/03/1984 | Brisbane Bullets | 123–67 | Perth Wildcats | Auchenflower Stadium | N/A | boxscore |
| 1/04/1984 | West Adelaide Bearcats | 122–107 | Coburg Giants | Apollo Entertainment Centre | N/A | boxscore |
| 1/04/1984 | Melbourne Tigers | 128–100 | Adelaide 36ers | Albert Park Basketball Stadium | N/A | boxscore |
| 1/04/1984 | Geelong Cats | 133–98 | St. Kilda Saints | Corio Leisure Centre | N/A | boxscore |
| 1/04/1984 | Devonport Warriors | 98–107 | Nunawading Spectres | Devonport Stadium | N/A | boxscore |
| 4/04/1984 | Nunawading Spectres | 80–96 | St. Kilda Saints | Melbourne Sports and Entertainment Centre | N/A | boxscore |
| 4/04/1984 | Coburg Giants | 100–113 | Geelong Cats | Melbourne Sports and Entertainment Centre | N/A | boxscore |

=== Round 10 ===
| Date | Home | Score | Away | Venue | Crowd | Box Score |
|---|---|---|---|---|---|---|
| 6/04/1984 | Perth Wildcats | 94–114 | Coburg Giants | Perry Lakes Basketball Stadium | N/A | boxscore |
| 6/04/1984 | Illawarra Hawks | 119–121 | Newcastle Falcons | Beaton Park Stadium | N/A | boxscore |
| 7/04/1984 | Frankston Bears | 109–78 | Sydney SuperSonics | Frankston Stadium | N/A | boxscore |
| 7/04/1984 | Brisbane Bullets | 115–89 | Newcastle Falcons | Auchenflower Stadium | N/A | boxscore |
| 7/04/1984 | Bankstown Bruins | 88–100 | Illawarra Hawks | Bankstown Basketball Stadium | N/A | boxscore |
| 7/04/1984 | Adelaide 36ers | 117–111 | Coburg Giants | Apollo Entertainment Centre | N/A | boxscore |
| 7/04/1984 | St. Kilda Saints | 95–93 | West Adelaide Bearcats | Albert Park Basketball Stadium | N/A | boxscore |
| 7/04/1984 | Canberra Cannons | 142–113 | Hobart Devils | AIS Arena | N/A | boxscore |
| 8/04/1984 | Nunawading Spectres | 98–91 | West Adelaide Bearcats | Burwood Stadium | N/A | boxscore |
| 8/04/1984 | Geelong Cats | 159–89 | Hobart Devils | Corio Leisure Centre | N/A | boxscore |
| 8/04/1984 | Melbourne Tigers | 140–84 | Sydney SuperSonics | Preston Stadium | N/A | boxscore |

=== Round 11 ===
| Date | Home | Score | Away | Venue | Crowd | Box Score |
|---|---|---|---|---|---|---|
| 13/04/1984 | Brisbane Bullets | 128–80 | Frankston Bears | Auchenflower Stadium | N/A | boxscore |
| 13/04/1984 | Perth Wildcats | 73–136 | Geelong Cats | Perry Lakes Basketball Stadium | N/A | boxscore |
| 14/04/1984 | Bankstown Bruins | 99–84 | Frankston Bears | Bankstown Basketball Stadium | N/A | boxscore |
| 14/04/1984 | Newcastle Falcons | 108–112 | Hobart Devils | Newcastle Sports Entertainment Centre | N/A | boxscore |
| 14/04/1984 | West Adelaide Bearcats | 110–104 | Devonport Warriors | Apollo Entertainment Centre | N/A | boxscore |
| 14/04/1984 | Nunawading Spectres | 83–84 | Canberra Cannons | Burwood Stadium | N/A | boxscore |
| 14/04/1984 | Melbourne Tigers | 107–114 | Illawarra Hawks | Albert Park Basketball Stadium | N/A | boxscore |
| 15/04/1984 | Sydney SuperSonics | 97–94 | Hobart Devils | Alexandria Stadium | N/A | boxscore |
| 15/04/1984 | Coburg Giants | 138–107 | Devonport Warriors | Ken Watson Stadium | N/A | boxscore |
| 15/04/1984 | St. Kilda Saints | 100–95 | Canberra Cannons | Albert Park Basketball Stadium | N/A | boxscore |
| 15/04/1984 | Adelaide 36ers | 116–102 | Geelong Cats | Apollo Entertainment Centre | N/A | boxscore |

=== Round 12 ===
| Date | Home | Score | Away | Venue | Crowd | Box Score |
|---|---|---|---|---|---|---|
| 27/04/1984 | Sydney SuperSonics | 84–119 | Newcastle Falcons | Alexandria Stadium | N/A | boxscore |
| 27/04/1984 | Brisbane Bullets | 115–91 | Illawarra Hawks | Auchenflower Stadium | N/A | boxscore |
| 27/04/1984 | Perth Wildcats | 90–91 | Nunawading Spectres | Perry Lakes Basketball Stadium | N/A | boxscore |
| 28/04/1984 | Newcastle Falcons | 122–109 | Illawarra Hawks | Newcastle Sports Entertainment Centre | N/A | boxscore |
| 28/04/1984 | West Adelaide Bearcats | 83–97 | Brisbane Bullets | Apollo Entertainment Centre | N/A | boxscore |
| 28/04/1984 | Devonport Warriors | 98–96 | Melbourne Tigers | Devonport Stadium | N/A | boxscore |
| 28/04/1984 | Canberra Cannons | 97–76 | Bankstown Bruins | AIS Arena | N/A | boxscore |
| 28/04/1984 | Frankston Bears | 95–102 | St. Kilda Saints | Frankston Stadium | N/A | boxscore |
| 28/04/1984 | Adelaide 36ers | 109–99 | Nunawading Spectres | Apollo Entertainment Centre | N/A | boxscore |
| 29/04/1984 | Coburg Giants | 116–104 | Brisbane Bullets | Ken Watson Stadium | N/A | boxscore |
| 29/04/1984 | Hobart Devils | 110–120 | Melbourne Tigers | Moonah Stadium | N/A | boxscore |
| 29/04/1984 | Geelong Cats | 103–96 | Bankstown Bruins | Corio Leisure Centre | N/A | boxscore |

=== Round 13 ===
| Date | Home | Score | Away | Venue | Crowd | Box Score |
|---|---|---|---|---|---|---|
| 4/05/1984 | Sydney SuperSonics | 88–125 | Frankston Bears | Alexandria Stadium | N/A | boxscore |
| 4/05/1984 | Brisbane Bullets | 90–111 | Nunawading Spectres | Auchenflower Stadium | N/A | boxscore |
| 5/05/1984 | Newcastle Falcons | 126–108 | Frankston Bears | Newcastle Sports Entertainment Centre | N/A | boxscore |
| 5/05/1984 | West Adelaide Bearcats | 154–90 | Sydney SuperSonics | Apollo Entertainment Centre | N/A | boxscore |
| 5/05/1984 | Bankstown Bruins | 76–74 | St. Kilda Saints | Bankstown Basketball Stadium | N/A | boxscore |
| 5/05/1984 | Illawarra Hawks | 88–89 | Nunawading Spectres | Beaton Park Stadium | N/A | boxscore |
| 5/05/1984 | Hobart Devils | 118–107 | Perth Wildcats | Moonah Stadium | N/A | boxscore |
| 5/05/1984 | Canberra Cannons | 118–122 | Adelaide 36ers | AIS Arena | N/A | boxscore |
| 6/05/1984 | Coburg Giants | 154–66 | Sydney SuperSonics | Ken Watson Stadium | N/A | boxscore |
| 6/05/1984 | Melbourne Tigers | 126–99 | St. Kilda Saints | Albert Park Basketball Stadium | N/A | boxscore |
| 6/05/1984 | Devonport Warriors | 119–100 | Perth Wildcats | Devonport Stadium | N/A | boxscore |
| 6/05/1984 | Geelong Cats | 125–101 | Adelaide 36ers | Corio Leisure Centre | N/A | boxscore |
| 12/05/1984 | Hobart Devils | 102–104 | Devonport Warriors | Moonah Stadium | N/A | boxscore |
| 12/05/1984 | Illawarra Hawks | 110–93 | Bankstown Bruins | Beaton Park Stadium | N/A | boxscore |

=== Round 14 ===
| Date | Home | Score | Away | Venue | Crowd | Box Score |
|---|---|---|---|---|---|---|
| 18/05/1984 | Illawarra Hawks | 113–110 | Frankston Bears | Beaton Park Stadium | N/A | boxscore |
| 18/05/1984 | Perth Wildcats | 128–126 | Devonport Warriors | Perry Lakes Basketball Stadium | N/A | boxscore |
| 18/05/1984 | Sydney SuperSonics | 75–122 | Geelong Cats | Alexandria Stadium | N/A | boxscore |
| 19/05/1984 | Brisbane Bullets | 113–74 | Bankstown Bruins | Auchenflower Stadium | N/A | boxscore |
| 19/05/1984 | Canberra Cannons | 118–107 | Frankston Bears | AIS Arena | N/A | boxscore |
| 19/05/1984 | Coburg Giants | 148–127 | West Adelaide Bearcats | Ken Watson Stadium | N/A | boxscore |
| 19/05/1984 | Adelaide 36ers | 125–112 | Devonport Warriors | Apollo Entertainment Centre | N/A | boxscore |
| 19/05/1984 | Newcastle Falcons | 104–128 | Geelong Cats | Newcastle Sports Entertainment Centre | N/A | boxscore |
| 19/05/1984 | St. Kilda Saints | 107–95 | Hobart Devils | Albert Park Basketball Stadium | N/A | boxscore |
| 20/05/1984 | West Adelaide Bearcats | 114–105 | Frankston Bears | Apollo Entertainment Centre | N/A | boxscore |
| 20/05/1984 | Melbourne Tigers | 128–124 | Coburg Giants | Albert Park Basketball Stadium | N/A | boxscore |
| 20/05/1984 | Bankstown Bruins | 130–85 | Sydney SuperSonics | Bankstown Basketball Stadium | N/A | boxscore |
| 20/05/1984 | Nunawading Spectres | 130–115 | Hobart Devils | Burwood Stadium | N/A | boxscore |

=== Round 15 ===
| Date | Home | Score | Away | Venue | Crowd | Box Score |
|---|---|---|---|---|---|---|
| 25/05/1984 | Perth Wildcats | 105–111 | Newcastle Falcons | Perry Lakes Basketball Stadium | N/A | boxscore |
| 25/05/1984 | Frankston Bears | 153–125 | West Adelaide Bearcats | Frankston Stadium | N/A | boxscore |
| 25/05/1984 | Canberra Cannons | 101–108 | Geelong Cats | AIS Arena | N/A | boxscore |
| 25/05/1984 | Sydney SuperSonics | 85–122 | Illawarra Hawks | Alexandria Stadium | N/A | boxscore |
| 26/05/1984 | Adelaide 36ers | 129–117 | Newcastle Falcons | Apollo Entertainment Centre | N/A | boxscore |
| 26/05/1984 | Brisbane Bullets | 92–109 | Coburg Giants | Auchenflower Stadium | N/A | boxscore |
| 26/05/1984 | Bankstown Bruins | 108–89 | West Adelaide Bearcats | Bankstown Basketball Stadium | N/A | boxscore |
| 26/05/1984 | Hobart Devils | 113–128 | Canberra Cannons | Moonah Stadium | N/A | boxscore |
| 26/05/1984 | St. Kilda Saints | 96–118 | Nunawading Spectres | Albert Park Basketball Stadium | N/A | boxscore |
| 27/05/1984 | Illawarra Hawks | 121–128 | Coburg Giants | Beaton Park Stadium | N/A | boxscore |
| 27/05/1984 | Melbourne Tigers | 127–111 | West Adelaide Bearcats | Albert Park Basketball Stadium | N/A | boxscore |
| 27/05/1984 | Devonport Warriors | 103–121 | Canberra Cannons | Devonport Stadium | N/A | boxscore |

=== Round 16 ===
| Date | Home | Score | Away | Venue | Crowd | Box Score |
|---|---|---|---|---|---|---|
| 1/06/1984 | Perth Wildcats | 106–97 | Frankston Bears | Perry Lakes Basketball Stadium | N/A | boxscore |
| 2/06/1984 | Canberra Cannons | 97–93 | Illawarra Hawks | AIS Arena | N/A | boxscore |
| 2/06/1984 | Hobart Devils | 102–111 | Brisbane Bullets | Kingsborough Sports Centre | N/A | boxscore |
| 2/06/1984 | West Adelaide Bearcats | 125–118 | Melbourne Tigers | Apollo Entertainment Centre | N/A | boxscore |
| 2/06/1984 | Newcastle Falcons | 102–91 | Bankstown Bruins | Newcastle Sports Entertainment Centre | N/A | boxscore |
| 2/06/1984 | Nunawading Spectres | 113–145 | Adelaide 36ers | Burwood Stadium | N/A | boxscore |
| 3/06/1984 | Geelong Cats | 109–114 | Illawarra Hawks | Corio Leisure Centre | N/A | boxscore |
| 3/06/1984 | Devonport Warriors | 66–128 | Brisbane Bullets | Devonport Stadium | N/A | boxscore |
| 3/06/1984 | Melbourne Tigers | 121–116 | Bankstown Bruins | Albert Park Basketball Stadium | N/A | boxscore |
| 3/06/1984 | Frankston Bears | 97–113 | Coburg Giants | Frankston Stadium | N/A | boxscore |
| 3/06/1984 | St. Kilda Saints | 104–121 | Adelaide 36ers | Albert Park Basketball Stadium | N/A | boxscore |

=== Round 17 ===
| Date | Home | Score | Away | Venue | Crowd | Box Score |
|---|---|---|---|---|---|---|
| 10/06/1984 | Canberra Cannons | 112–94 | Nunawading Spectres | AIS Arena | N/A | boxscore |
| 15/06/1984 | Sydney SuperSonics | 98–128 | West Adelaide Bearcats | Alexandria Stadium | N/A | boxscore |
| 15/06/1984 | Brisbane Bullets | 99–96 | Adelaide 36ers | Auchenflower Stadium | N/A | boxscore |
| 16/06/1984 | Newcastle Falcons | 134–107 | West Adelaide Bearcats | Newcastle Sports Entertainment Centre | N/A | boxscore |
| 16/06/1984 | Frankston Bears | 110–93 | Devonport Warriors | Frankston Stadium | N/A | boxscore |
| 16/06/1984 | Hobart Devils | 106–112 | St. Kilda Saints | Moonah Stadium | N/A | boxscore |
| 16/06/1984 | Bankstown Bruins | 104–95 | Perth Wildcats | Bankstown Basketball Stadium | N/A | boxscore |
| 16/06/1984 | Illawarra Hawks | 139–101 | Adelaide 36ers | Beaton Park Stadium | N/A | boxscore |
| 17/06/1984 | Devonport Warriors | 102–100 | St. Kilda Saints | Devonport Stadium | N/A | boxscore |
| 17/06/1984 | Geelong Cats | 89–82 | Nunawading Spectres | Corio Leisure Centre | N/A | boxscore |
| 17/06/1984 | Melbourne Tigers | 147–130 | Perth Wildcats | Albert Park Basketball Stadium | N/A | boxscore |

== Ladder ==
The home-and-away regular season took place over 17 rounds between 3 February and 17 June, with nine teams in the Eastern Division and eight teams in the Western Division. Each team would play the other teams in their division twice and the teams in the opposing division once. This meant that Western Division teams played 23 games and Eastern Division teams played 24.

Eastern Division

| Pos | 1984 NBL season | | | | | | | | | | | |
| Pos | Team | Pld | W | L | PCT | Last 5 | Streak | Home | Away | PF | PA | PP |
|---|---|---|---|---|---|---|---|---|---|---|---|---|
| 1 | Brisbane Bullets | 24 | 19 | 5 | 79.17% | 4–1 | W3 | 10–2 | 9–3 | 2546 | 2117 | 120.26% |
| 2 | Coburg Giants^{1} | 24 | 18 | 6 | 75.00% | 4–1 | W3 | 11–1 | 7–5 | 3032 | 2579 | 117.56% |
| 3 | Newcastle Falcons^{1} | 24 | 18 | 6 | 75.00% | 3–2 | W2 | 10–2 | 8–4 | 2674 | 2486 | 107.56% |
| 4 | Illawarra Hawks | 24 | 13 | 11 | 54.17% | 3–2 | W2 | 7–5 | 6–6 | 2539 | 2488 | 102.05% |
| 5 | Melbourne Tigers ^{2} | 24 | 11 | 13 | 45.83% | 4–1 | W2 | 8–4 | 3–9 | 2669 | 2584 | 103.29% |
| 6 | West Adelaide Bearcats ^{2} | 24 | 11 | 13 | 45.83% | 2–3 | L1 | 8–4 | 3–9 | 2580 | 2660 | 96.99% |
| 7 | Bankstown Bruins ^{3} | 24 | 10 | 14 | 41.67% | 3–2 | W1 | 7–5 | 3–9 | 2303 | 2380 | 96.76% |
| 8 | Frankston Bears ^{3} | 24 | 10 | 14 | 41.67% | 2–3 | W1 | 8–4 | 2–10 | 2475 | 2576 | 96.08% |
| 9 | Sydney Supersonics | 24 | 3 | 21 | 12.50% | 0–5 | L8 | 2–10 | 1–11 | 2170 | 2888 | 75.14% |

Western Division

| Pos | 1984 NBL season | | | | | | | | | | | |
| Pos | Team | Pld | W | L | PCT | Last 5 | Streak | Home | Away | PF | PA | PP |
|---|---|---|---|---|---|---|---|---|---|---|---|---|
| 1 | Geelong Cats | 23 | 21 | 2 | 91.30% | 4–1 | W1 | 10–1 | 11–1 | 2735 | 2236 | 122.32% |
| 2 | Canberra Cannons^{4} | 23 | 16 | 7 | 69.57% | 4–1 | W4 | 9–4 | 7–3 | 2514 | 2303 | 109.16% |
| 3 | Adelaide 36ers^{4} | 23 | 16 | 7 | 69.57% | 3–2 | L2 | 9–2 | 7–5 | 2762 | 2590 | 106.64% |
| 4 | Nunawading Spectres | 23 | 14 | 9 | 60.87% | 2–3 | L3 | 5–6 | 9–3 | 2410 | 2279 | 105.75% |
| 5 | St. Kilda Saints | 23 | 9 | 14 | 39.13% | 2–3 | L1 | 5–6 | 4–8 | 2315 | 2446 | 94.64% |
| 6 | Hobart Devils^{5} | 23 | 4 | 19 | 17.39% | 0–5 | L6 | 1–11 | 3–8 | 2340 | 2689 | 87.02% |
| 7 | Devonport Warriors^{5} | 23 | 4 | 19 | 17.39% | 1–4 | W1 | 3–8 | 1–11 | 2257 | 2623 | 86.05% |
| 8 | Perth Wildcats | 23 | 3 | 20 | 13.04% | 2–3 | L2 | 3–9 | 0–11 | 2176 | 2573 | 84.57% |

Updated to match(es) played on 17 June 1984. Source: NBL.com.au

The NBL tie-breaker system as outlined in the NBL Rules and Regulations states that in the case of an identical win–loss record, the results in games played between the teams will determine order of seeding.

^{1}Head-to-Head between Coburg Giants and Newcastle Falcons (1-1). Coburg Giants won For and Against (+4).

^{2}Head-to-Head between Melbourne Tigers and West Adelaide Bearcats (1-1). Melbourne Tigers won For and Against (+9).

^{3}Head-to-Head between Bankstown Bruins and Frankston Bears (1-1). Bankstown Bruins won For and Against (+13).

^{4}Head-to-Head between Canberra Cannons and Adelaide 36ers (1-1). Canberra Cannons won For and Against (+7).

^{5}Head-to-Head between Hobart Devils and Devonport Warriors (1-1). Hobart Devils won For and Against (+1).

== Finals ==
=== Playoff bracket ===
Preliminary / Elimination Finals
E1 | Brisbane Bullets | 105
E2 | Coburg Giants | 104
E3 | Newcastle Falcons | 108
E4 | Illawarra Hawks | 104
W3 | Adelaide 36ers | 101
W4 | Nunawading Spectres | 108
W1 | Geelong Cats | 81
W2 | Canberra Cannons | 87

Qualifying Finals
E2 | Coburg Giants | 132
E3 | Newcastle Falcons | 109
W1 | Geelong Cats | 115
W4 | Nunawading Spectres | 91

Semifinals
E1 | Brisbane Bullets | 107
W1 | Geelong Cats | 103
W2 | Canberra Cannons | 108
E2 | Coburg Giants | 107

Grand Final
E1 | Brisbane Bullets | 82
W2 | Canberra Cannons | 84

The NBL finals series in 1984 consisted of the elimination-style divisional finals, two semifinal games, and one championship-deciding grand final.

=== Divisional Elimination Finals ===
The top four teams in each division competed in a 1v2/3v4 elimination finals fixture, with the loser of 1v2 playing the winner of 3v4 for a spot in the Semi-finals, while the winner of 1v2 qualified through to the Semi-finals as well.

==== Western Division ====
| Date | Home | Score | Away | Venue | Crowd | Box Score |
|---|---|---|---|---|---|---|
| 22/06/1984 | Canberra Cannons | 87–81 | Geelong Cats | AIS Arena | N/A | boxscore |
| 22/06/1984 | Nunawading Spectres | 108–101 | Adelaide 36ers | Melbourne Sports and Entertainment Centre | N/A | boxscore |

| Date | Home | Score | Away | Venue | Crowd | Box Score |
|---|---|---|---|---|---|---|
| 23/06/1984 | Geelong Cats | 115–91 | Nunawading Spectres | AIS Arena | N/A | boxscore |

==== Eastern Division ====
| Date | Home | Score | Away | Venue | Crowd | Box Score |
|---|---|---|---|---|---|---|
| 22/06/1984 | Brisbane Bullets | 105–104 | Coburg Giants | Melbourne Sports and Entertainment Centre | N/A | boxscore |
| 22/06/1984 | Newcastle Falcons | 108–101 | Illawarra Hawks | Melbourne Sports and Entertainment Centre | N/A | boxscore |

| Date | Home | Score | Away | Venue | Crowd | Box Score |
|---|---|---|---|---|---|---|
| 23/06/1984 | Newcastle Falcons | 109–132 | Coburg Giants | AIS Arena | N/A | boxscore |

=== Semi-finals ===
| Date | Home | Score | Away | Venue | Crowd | Box Score |
|---|---|---|---|---|---|---|
| 29/06/1984 | Canberra Cannons | 108–107 | Coburg Giants | AIS Arena | N/A | boxscore |
| 29/06/1984 | Geelong Cats | 103–107 | Brisbane Bullets | Melbourne Sports and Entertainment Centre | N/A | boxscore |

=== Grand Final ===
| Date | Home | Score | Away | Venue | Crowd | Box Score |
|---|---|---|---|---|---|---|
| 1/07/1984 | Brisbane Bullets | 82–84 | Canberra Cannons | Melbourne Sports and Entertainment Centre | N/A | boxscore |

== Awards ==
=== Statistics leaders ===
| Category | Player | Team | Stat |
|---|---|---|---|
| Points | Al Green | West Adelaide Bearcats | 829 pts / 21 games |
| Rebounds per game | Dean Uthoff | Nunawading Spectres | 18.4 rpg / 20 games |
| Steals | Leroy Loggins | Brisbane Bullets | 82 / 24 games |
| Blocks | Dan Clausen | Adelaide 36ers | 76 / 23 games |
| Field goal percentage | Donny Gipson | West Adelaide Bearcats | 63.8% (175/274) |
| 3-point field goal percentage | Ray Wood | West Adelaide Bearcats | 45.1% (42/93) |
| Free throw percentage | Ron Radliff | Brisbane Bullets | 91.1% (41/45) |

=== Regular season ===
- Most Valuable Player: Leroy Loggins (Brisbane Bullets)
- Rookie of the Year: Andrew Gaze (Melbourne Tigers)
- Coach of the Year: Brian Kerle (Brisbane Bullets)
- All-NBL Team:
  - Phil Smyth (Canberra Cannons)
  - Leroy Loggins (Brisbane Bullets)
  - Dan Clausen (Adelaide 36ers)
  - James Crawford (Geelong Cats)
  - Cal Bruton (Geelong Cats)
