= Andy Campbell (basketball) =

Australian basketball player

Andrew Campbell
Personal information
- Born: 21 July 1956 (age 70) Melbourne, Australia
- Listed height: 218 cm (7 ft 2 in)
- Listed weight: 93 kg (205 lb)

Career information
- College: LSU (1977–1981)
- Position: Center

Career history

Playing
- 1983: West Adelaide Bearcats
- 1984–1986: Canberra Cannons

Coaching
- 1988–1991: Canberra Cannons (assistant)

Career highlights
- As player: NBL champion (1984); NBL blocks leader (1985); As assistant coach: NBL champion (1988)

Career NBL statistics
- Points: 891 (8.7 ppg)
- Rebounds: 617 (6.0 rpg)
- Blocks: 249 (2.4 bpg)

Andrew Campbell (born 21 July 1956) is an Australian basketball player. He competed in the men's tournament at the 1976 Summer Olympics and the 1984 Summer Olympics with the Australia national team. He played college basketball with Lake City Community College in Florida (now Florida Gateway College) from 1976 to 1977 and Louisiana State University from 1977 to 1981. Following his college career, he played professionally in the National Basketball League where he won the NBL championship in 1984.

== Professional career ==
In 1983, he joined the West Adelaide Bearcats in the Australian National Basketball League and helped them to the NBL finals where the team lost to the Canberra Cannons. The following season, he joined the Cannons and helped the club win the 1984 NBL championship. In 1985, he led the NBL in blocked shots. In September 1986 he suffered a season ending knee injury that ultimately led to his retirement before the start of the 1987 season.

== Coaching career ==
In 1988, Campbell was hired as an assistant coach to the Canberra Cannons. In October 1989, he took over as interim head coach, following Steve Breheny's 20-game suspension.

== Personal life ==
In 1991, Campbell had an open heart surgery to repair an aortic aneurysm and have a valve replaced.
