= Les Riddle =

Australian basketball player

Personal information
- Nationality: Australian
- Born: 28 December 1953 (age 71)

Sport
- Sport: Basketball

Les Riddle (born 28 December 1953) is an Australian basketball player. He competed in the men's tournament at the 1980 Summer Olympics.
