= Hobart Devils =

Defunct basketball team from Hobart, Tasmania, Australia

- Nickname: Tassie Devils
- Leagues: NBL
- Founded: 1983
- Dissolved: 1996
- History: Hobart Devils; 1983–1986; 1996; Hobart Tassie Devils; 1987–1995
- Arena: Kingborough Sports Centre (1983–88); Derwent Entertainment Centre (1989–96)
- Capacity: 1,800 (Kingborough); 5,400 (DEC)
- Location: Hobart, Tasmania
- Team colors: Green, Red, Yellow, White
- Championships: 0
Home	Away

The Hobart Devils (also known as Hobart Tassie Devils) are a defunct professional basketball team that competed in the Australian National Basketball League (NBL).

== History ==
The Hobart Devils debuted in the National Basketball League (NBL) in the 1983 season. The team played their home games at Kingborough Sports Centre from 1983 to 1988 before moving to the Derwent Entertainment Centre in 1989, where they stayed until folding in 1996.

During Devils home games, the home court arena was often referred to as the "Devils Den" by local TV commentators. They club was known as Hobart Tassie Devils from 1987 to 1995, but reverted to Hobart Devils in its final season. The Devils' most successful season was in 1987 when they recorded 14 wins.

== Honour roll ==
NBL Championships:	None
NBL Finals Appearances:	None
NBL Grand Final Appearances:	None
NBL Most Valuable Players:	Joe Hurst (1988)
NBL Grand Final MVPs:	None
All-NBL First Team:	Steve Carfino (1986, 1987)
All-NBL Second Team:	Paul Stanley (1987), Joe Hurst (1988)
NBL Rookie of the Year:	Justin Cass (1990)
NBL Most Improved Player:	Andrew Svaldenis (1992)
NBL Best Defensive Player:	None
NBL Top Point Scorer:	Paul Stanley (920 pts; 1987)
NBL Coach of the Year:	None

== Season by season ==
NBL champions	League champions	Runners-up	Finals berth

Season	Tier	League	Regular season					Post-season	Head coach
Season	Tier	League	Finish	Played	Wins	Losses	Win %	Post-season	Head coach
Hobart Devils
1983	1	NBL	8th	22	2	20	.091	Did not qualify	Keith Scott
1984	1	NBL	6th	23	4	19	.174	Did not qualify	Danny Adamson
1985	1	NBL	14th	26	2	24	.077	Did not qualify	Charlie Ammit
1986	1	NBL	11th	26	9	17	.346	Did not qualify	Dave Adkins
Hobart Tassie Devils
1987	1	NBL	7th	26	14	12	.538	Did not qualify	Dave Adkins
1988	1	NBL	9th	24	10	14	.417	Did not qualify	Dave Adkins
1989	1	NBL	10th	24	8	16	.333	Did not qualify	Dave Adkins; Gordie McLeod; Tom Maher
1990	1	NBL	12th	26	8	18	.308	Did not qualify	Tom Maher
1991	1	NBL	12th	26	8	18	.308	Did not qualify	Tom Maher
1992	1	NBL	11th	24	9	15	.375	Did not qualify	Cal Bruton
1993	1	NBL	13th	26	6	20	.231	Did not qualify	Cal Bruton; Bill Tomlinson
1994	1	NBL	14th	26	2	24	.077	Did not qualify	Bill Tomlinson
1995	1	NBL	14th	26	4	22	.154	Did not qualify	Bill Tomlinson
Hobart Devils
1996	1	NBL	12th	26	8	18	.308	Did not qualify	Bill Tomlinson
Regular season record				351	94	257	.268	0 regular season champions	
Finals record				0	0	0	.000	0 NBL championships	

As of the end of the 1996 season

*Note: In 1983 and 1984, the NBL was split into Eastern and Western divisions during the regular season.
