= Albert Park Basketball Stadium =

Sports venue in Melbourne, Australia

- Interactive map of Albert Park Basketball Stadium
- Location: Albert Park, Victoria
- Coordinates: 37.8503°S 144.9705°E
- Capacity: 2,000

Construction
- Groundbreaking: 1956
- Opened: 1958
- Closed: 10 July 1997
- Demolished: 1997

Tenants
- St. Kilda Saints (NBL) (1979–1983); Melbourne Tigers (NBL) (1984–1987)

Albert Park Basketball Stadium was an Australian basketball centre in Albert Park, Victoria. The nine-court arena was the home of NBL side St. Kilda Saints and Melbourne United (formerly Melbourne Tigers).

On 10 June 1979, Albert Park hosted the inaugural NBL Grand Final, which saw the St Kilda Saints defeat the Canberra Cannons 94–93. Larry Sengstock, with 33 points scored for St Kilda, won the first NBL Grand Final Most Valuable Player Award.

The stadium was closed and demolished in 1997, and was replaced with basketball facilities incorporated into the Melbourne Sports and Aquatic Centre that was built on the nearby within Albert Park.

For a number of years, attached to the back of the stadium was a house that was the official residence of the general manager of the Victorian Basketball Association. The long time VBA general manager was former Australian and long time Melbourne Tigers coach Lindsay Gaze and the manager's residence was the home of the Gaze family, which included Lindsay's son Andrew and nephew Mark, who both played for Australia as Lindsay had done in the 1950s and 1960s. Andrew Gaze later told that his father and he would spend many nights by themselves either in their back yard (on one of the 7 outdoor courts) or in the 2,000-seat stadium working on his game, though Lindsay just said that to him it was father and son spending time together.
