= Perry Lakes Basketball Stadium =

Purpose-built basketball stadium located in Perth, Western Australia

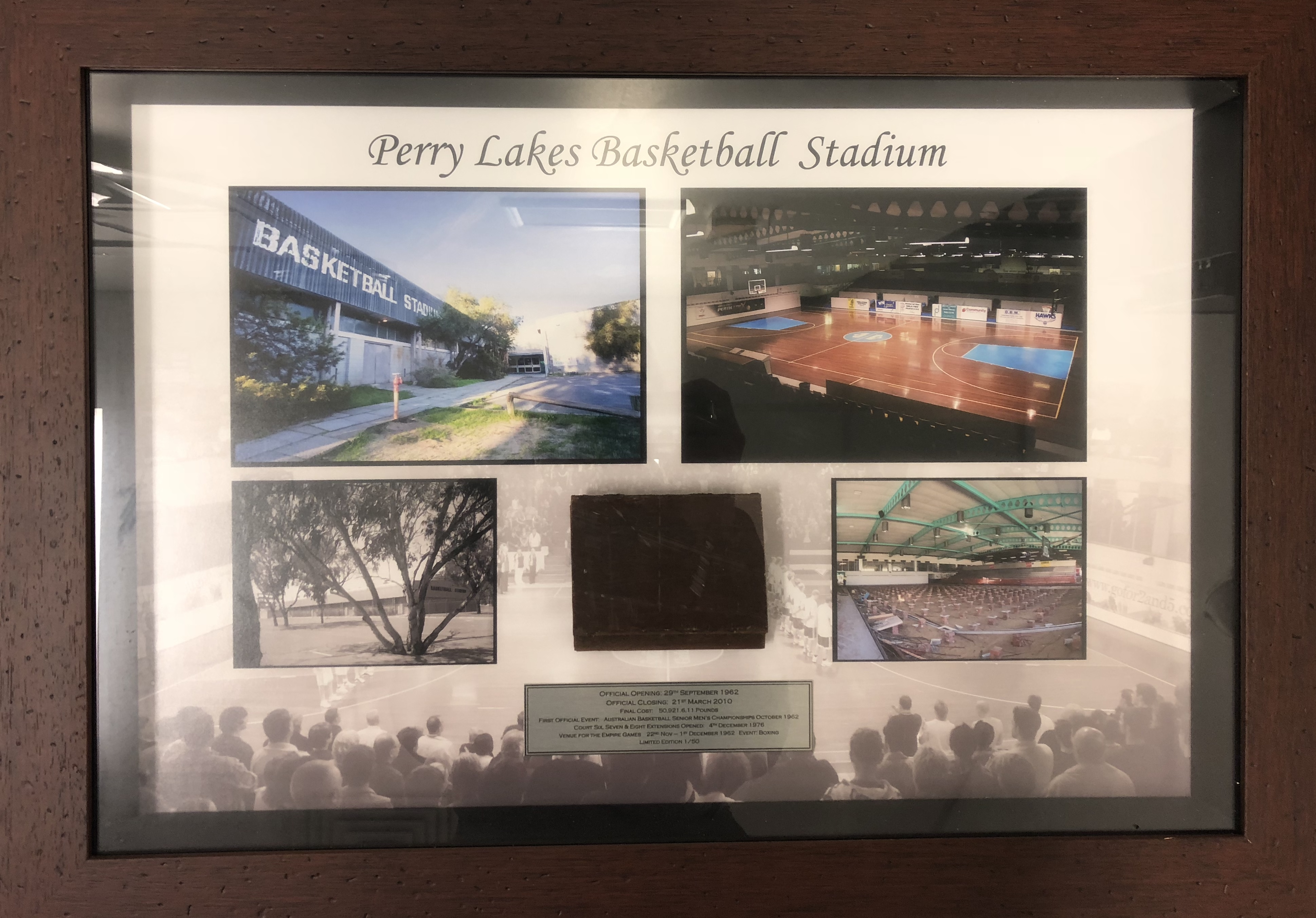
- Interactive map of Perry Lakes Basketball Stadium
- Location: Meagher Drive, Floreat, Western Australia
- Coordinates: 31°56′47″S 115°47′16″E
- Capacity: 1,500 (main court)
- Surface: Hardwood

Construction
- Opened: 29 September 1962
- Closed: 21 March 2010
- Demolished: 2011

Tenants
- Perry Lakes Basketball Association; Basketball Western Australia; Perth Wildcats (NBL) (1982–1986); Perth Lynx (WNBL) (1990–1992, 2000s); 1962 British Empire and Commonwealth Games

Perry Lakes Basketball Stadium was a purpose-built basketball stadium located in Perth, Western Australia. The stadium was built as part of the city's new building constructions for the 1962 British Empire and Commonwealth Games, with the intention to host the boxing events and then be used permanently as a basketball venue.

Before the Games started in November 1962, the venue hosted the Australian Basketball Senior men's championships held in October, and was Western Australia's home of basketball until 2010.

At the time of construction, the stadium featured three courts and had no second stand facing Court 1. Courts 2 and 3 had bitumen surfaces and ran parallel to the other courts. Later Courts 4 and 5 were added, followed by the corridor along with Courts 6, 7 and 8. Court 1 at Perry Lakes was considered by many to be second only to Apollo Stadium in Adelaide as the finest in Australia.

The stadium housed the headquarters of Basketball Western Australia and Perry Lakes Basketball Association. The Perth Wildcats played their home games at Perry Lakes between 1982 and 1986, while the Perth Lynx also hosted games at Perry Lakes during the 1990s and 2000s.

The stadium was closed in March 2010 and later demolished to make way for housing developments. The stadium's successor was the WA Basketball Centre, located just metres down the road.
