= List of NBL seasons =

Australian Basketball seasons

The National Basketball League (NBL) is the pre-eminent men's professional basketball league in Australia and New Zealand. The league was founded in 1979.

== List of NBL champions ==
| Year^{[a]} | Season champions | Record | Year^{[b]} | Champions | No. of teams^{[c]} | Notes^{[d]} |
| Regular season | | | Finals | | No. of teams^{[c]} | Notes^{[d]} |
|---|---|---|---|---|---|---|
| 1979 | St. Kilda Saints | 15–3 | 1979 | St. Kilda Saints | 10 | Inaugural season. |
| 1980 | St. Kilda Saints | 17–5 | 1980 | St. Kilda Saints | 12 | 3 new teams joined and 1 team folded. |
| 1981 | St. Kilda Saints | 17–5 | 1981 | Launceston Casino City | 12 | 1 team renamed. |
| 1982 | West Adelaide Bearcats | 21–5 | 1982 | West Adelaide Bearcats | 14 | 1 team left, 3 new teams joined and 1 team renamed. |
| 1983 | Sydney Supersonics (Eastern); Geelong Cats (Western) | 19–3; 18–4 | 1983 | Canberra Cannons | 16 | 1 team left, 3 new teams joined and 1 team renamed. |
| 1984 | Brisbane Bullets (Eastern); Geelong Cats (Western) | 19–5; 21–2 | 1984 | Canberra Cannons | 17 | All-time highest number of teams competed in a single season. 1 new team joined and 1 team renamed. |
| 1985 | Brisbane Bullets | 20–6 | 1985 | Brisbane Bullets | 14 | 2 teams folded and 1 team left. |
| 1986 | Adelaide 36ers | 24–2 | 1986 | Adelaide 36ers | 14 | Grand Final series introduced. 2 teams renamed. |
| 1987 | Adelaide 36ers | 21–5 | 1987 | Brisbane Bullets | 14 | 3 Melbourne teams renamed. |
| 1988 | Adelaide 36ers | 19–5 | 1988 | Canberra Cannons | 13 | 2 Sydney teams merged and 1 team renamed. |
| 1989 | Canberra Cannons | 18–6 | 1989 | North Melbourne Giants | 13 | First time in the league history that the same teams from the previous season competed in the next season. |
| 1990 | North Melbourne Giants | 20–6 | 1990 | Perth Wildcats | 14 | 1 new team joined. |
| 1991 | Perth Wildcats | 22–4 | 1991 | Perth Wildcats | 14 | 2 teams renamed. |
| 1992 | South East Melbourne Magic | 20–4 | 1992 | South East Melbourne Magic | 13 | 2 Melbourne teams merged. |
| 1993 | Perth Wildcats | 21–5 | 1993 | Melbourne Tigers | 14 | 1 new team joined. |
| 1994 | Melbourne Tigers | 19–7 | 1994 | North Melbourne Giants | 14 | |
| 1995 | Perth Wildcats | 19–7 | 1995 | Perth Wildcats | 14 | |
| 1996 | Melbourne Tigers | 21–5 | 1996 | South East Melbourne Magic | 14 | 1 team renamed. |
| 1997 | South East Melbourne Magic | 22–8 | 1997 | Melbourne Tigers | 11 | 3 teams folded. |
| 1998 | South East Melbourne Magic | 26–4 | 1998 | Adelaide 36ers | 11 | 1 team renamed. |
| 1998–99 | Adelaide 36ers | 18–8 | 1999 | Adelaide 36ers | 11 | 2 Melbourne teams merged, 1 new team joined and 1 team renamed. |
| 1999–00 | Adelaide 36ers | 22–6 | 2000 | Perth Wildcats | 11 | 1 team folded and 1 new team joined. |
| 2000–01 | Victoria Titans | 22–6 | 2001 | Wollongong Hawks | 11 | |
| 2001–02 | Victoria Titans | 21–9 | 2002 | Adelaide 36ers | 11 | |
| 2002–03 | Sydney Kings | 22–8 | 2003 | Sydney Kings | 11 | 1 team renamed. |
| 2003–04 | Sydney Kings | 26–7 | 2004 | Sydney Kings | 12 | 1 New Zealand team joined and 1 team relocated and renamed. |
| 2004–05 | Sydney Kings | 21–11 | 2005 | Sydney Kings | 11 | 1 team folded. |
| 2005–06 | Sydney Kings | 26–6 | 2006 | Melbourne Tigers | 11 | |
| 2006–07 | Brisbane Bullets | 28–5 | 2007 | Brisbane Bullets | 12 | 1 new team joined and 1 team relocated to Singapore and renamed. |
| 2007–08 | Sydney Kings | 27–3 | 2008 | Melbourne Tigers | 13 | 1 team joined. |
| 2008–09 | South Dragons | 22–8 | 2009 | South Dragons | 10 | 2 teams folded, 1 team left and 1 team renamed. |
| 2009–10 | Perth Wildcats | 17–11 | 2010 | Perth Wildcats | 8 | 1 team folded and 1 team quit. |
| 2010–11 | New Zealand Breakers | 22–6 | 2011 | New Zealand Breakers | 9 | 1 team returned. |
| 2011–12 | New Zealand Breakers | 21–7 | 2012 | New Zealand Breakers | 9 | |
| 2012–13 | New Zealand Breakers | 24–4 | 2013 | New Zealand Breakers | 8 | 1 team folded. |
| 2013–14 | Perth Wildcats | 24–4 | 2014 | Perth Wildcats | 8 | |
| 2014–15 | Cairns Taipans | 21–7 | 2015 | New Zealand Breakers | 8 | 1 team left and 1 new team joined. |
| 2015–16 | Melbourne United | 18–10 | 2016 | Perth Wildcats | 8 | 1 team renamed. |
| 2016–17 | Adelaide 36ers | 17–11 | 2017 | Perth Wildcats | 8 | 1 team folded and 1 team returned. |
| 2017–18 | Melbourne United | 20–8 | 2018 | Melbourne United | 8 | |
| 2018–19 | Perth Wildcats | 18–10 | 2019 | Perth Wildcats | 8 | |
| 2019–20 | Sydney Kings | 20–8 | 2020 | Perth Wildcats | 9 | 1 team joined. Finals were shortened due to the COVID-19 pandemic. |
| 2020–21 | Melbourne United | 28–8 | 2021 | Melbourne United | 9 | |
| 2021–22 | Melbourne United | 20–8 | 2022 | Sydney Kings | 10 | 1 new team joined. |
| 2022–23 | Sydney Kings | 19–9 | 2023 | Sydney Kings | 10 | |
| 2023–24 | Melbourne United | 20–8 | 2024 | Tasmania JackJumpers | 10 | |
| 2024–25 | Illawarra Hawks | 20–9 | 2025 | Illawarra Hawks | 10 | |

== List of NBL standings ==
=== 2025–26 ===
| Pos | Team | Pld | W | L | GF | GA | PP | PCT | Qualification |
|---|---|---|---|---|---|---|---|---|---|
| 1 | Sydney Kings | 33 | 24 | 9 | 3276 | 2879 | 113.8 | 72.73 | Semifinals |
| 2 | Adelaide 36ers | 33 | 23 | 10 | 3042 | 2890 | 105.3 | 69.70 | Semifinals |
| 3 | South East Melbourne Phoenix | 33 | 22 | 11 | 3324 | 3061 | 108.6 | 66.67 | Play-in |
| 4 | Perth Wildcats | 33 | 21 | 12 | 2996 | 2840 | 105.5 | 63.64 | Play-in |
| 5 | Melbourne United | 33 | 20 | 13 | 3041 | 2905 | 104.7 | 60.61 | Play-in |
| 6 | Tasmania JackJumpers | 33 | 14 | 19 | 2873 | 2884 | 99.6 | 42.42 | Play-in |
| 7 | New Zealand Breakers | 33 | 13 | 20 | 3022 | 3058 | 98.8 | 39.39 | |
| 8 | Illawarra Hawks | 33 | 13 | 20 | 3074 | 3205 | 95.9 | 39.39 | |
| 9 | Cairns Taipans | 33 | 9 | 24 | 2754 | 3194 | 86.2 | 27.27 | |
| 10 | Brisbane Bullets | 33 | 6 | 27 | 2710 | 3196 | 84.8 | 18.18 | |

Updated to match(es) played on 20 February 2026. Source: NBL.com.au

Play-in / Seeding qualifier
5 | Melbourne United
6 | Tasmania JackJumpers
3 | S.E. Melbourne Phoenix
4 | Perth Wildcats

Play-in game

Semifinals
1 | Sydney Kings
2 | Adelaide 36ers

Grand Final

=== 2025–26 Ignite Cup ===
| Pos | Team | Pld | W | L | PF | PA | PP | BP | Pts | Qualification |
|---|---|---|---|---|---|---|---|---|---|---|
| 1 | Adelaide 36ers | 4 | 3 | 1 | 390 | 329 | 118.5 | 12 | 21 | Ignite Cup final |
| 2 | New Zealand Breakers | 4 | 3 | 1 | 441 | 385 | 114.5 | 11 | 20 | Ignite Cup final |
| 3 | Perth Wildcats | 4 | 3 | 1 | 399 | 365 | 109.3 | 9.5 | 18.5 | |
| 4 | Melbourne United | 4 | 2 | 2 | 390 | 359 | 108.6 | 9.5 | 15.5 | |
| 5 | Tasmania JackJumpers | 4 | 2 | 2 | 349 | 338 | 103.3 | 8.5 | 14.5 | |
| 6 | S.E. Melbourne Phoenix | 4 | 2 | 2 | 408 | 402 | 101.5 | 8 | 14 | |
| 7 | Illawarra Hawks | 4 | 2 | 2 | 372 | 397 | 93.7 | 7 | 13 | |
| 8 | Brisbane Bullets | 4 | 1 | 3 | 334 | 411 | 81.3 | 6 | 9 | |
| 9 | Sydney Kings | 4 | 1 | 3 | 350 | 381 | 91.9 | 5 | 8 | |
| 10 | Cairns Taipans | 4 | 1 | 3 | 340 | 406 | 83.7 | 3.5 | 6.5 | |

Updated to match(es) played on 28 January 2026. Source: Ignitecup.com.au

=== 2024–25 ===
| Pos | Team | Pld | W | L | GF | GA | PP | PCT | Qualification |
|---|---|---|---|---|---|---|---|---|---|
| 1 | Illawarra Hawks | 29 | 20 | 9 | 2941 | 2645 | 111.2 | 68.97 | Semifinals |
| 2 | Melbourne United | 29 | 19 | 10 | 2771 | 2652 | 104.5 | 65.52 | Semifinals |
| 3 | Perth Wildcats | 29 | 18 | 11 | 2903 | 2811 | 103.3 | 62.07 | Play-in |
| 4 | South East Melbourne Phoenix | 29 | 16 | 13 | 2787 | 2656 | 104.9 | 55.17 | Play-in |
| 5 | Sydney Kings | 29 | 16 | 13 | 2630 | 2557 | 102.9 | 55.17 | Play-in |
| 6 | Adelaide 36ers | 29 | 13 | 16 | 2736 | 2796 | 97.9 | 44.83 | Play-in |
| 7 | Tasmania JackJumpers | 29 | 13 | 16 | 2435 | 2553 | 95.4 | 44.83 | |
| 8 | Brisbane Bullets | 29 | 12 | 17 | 2678 | 2838 | 94.4 | 41.38 | |
| 9 | New Zealand Breakers | 29 | 10 | 19 | 2485 | 2650 | 93.8 | 34.48 | |
| 10 | Cairns Taipans | 29 | 8 | 21 | 2561 | 2769 | 92.5 | 27.59 | |

Updated to match(es) played on 8 February 2025. Source: NBL.com.au

Play-in / Seeding qualifier
5 | Sydney Kings | 88
6 | Adelaide 36ers | 95
3 | Perth Wildcats | 122
4 | S.E. Melbourne Phoenix | 105

Play-in game
4 | S.E. Melbourne Phoenix | 85
6 | Adelaide 36ers | 75

Semifinals
1 | Illawarra Hawks | 101 | 94 | 126
4 | S.E. Melbourne Phoenix | 94 | 101 | 96
2 | Melbourne United | 105 | 89 | 113
3 | Perth Wildcats | 93 | 96 | 112

Grand Final
1 | Illawarra Hawks | 88 | 102 | 77 | 80 | 114
2 | Melbourne United | 96 | 100 | 83 | 71 | 104

=== 2023–24 ===
| Pos | Team | Pld | W | L | GF | GA | PP | PCT | Qualification |
|---|---|---|---|---|---|---|---|---|---|
| 1 | Melbourne United | 28 | 20 | 8 | 2615 | 2454 | 106.6 | 71.43 | Semifinals |
| 2 | Perth Wildcats | 28 | 17 | 11 | 2630 | 2563 | 102.6 | 60.71 | Semifinals |
| 3 | Tasmania JackJumpers | 28 | 16 | 12 | 2564 | 2378 | 107.8 | 57.14 | Play-in |
| 4 | Illawarra Hawks | 28 | 14 | 14 | 2547 | 2518 | 101.2 | 50.00 | Play-in |
| 5 | Sydney Kings | 28 | 13 | 15 | 2672 | 2602 | 102.7 | 46.43 | Play-in |
| 6 | New Zealand Breakers | 28 | 13 | 15 | 2498 | 2480 | 100.7 | 46.43 | Play-in |
| 7 | Brisbane Bullets | 28 | 13 | 15 | 2458 | 2534 | 97.0 | 46.43 | |
| 8 | Cairns Taipans | 28 | 12 | 16 | 2506 | 2589 | 96.8 | 42.86 | |
| 9 | Adelaide 36ers | 28 | 12 | 16 | 2457 | 2563 | 95.9 | 42.86 | |
| 10 | South East Melbourne Phoenix | 28 | 10 | 18 | 2425 | 2691 | 90.1 | 35.71 | |

Updated to match(es) played on 18 February 2024. Source: NBL.com.au

Play-in / Seeding qualifier
5 | Sydney Kings | 76
6 | New Zealand Breakers | 83
3 | Tasmania JackJumpers | 92
4 | Illawarra Hawks | 76

Play-in game
4 | Illawarra Hawks | 88
6 | New Zealand Breakers | 85

Semifinals
1 | Melbourne United | 115 | 108 | 100
4 | Illawarra Hawks | 106 | 113 | 94
2 | Perth Wildcats | 89 | 94 | 84
3 | Tasmania JackJumpers | 81 | 102 | 100

Grand Final
1 | Melbourne United | 104 | 77 | 91 | 88 | 81
3 | Tasmania JackJumpers | 81 | 82 | 93 | 86 | 83

=== 2022–23 ===
| Pos | Team | Pld | W | L | GF | GA | PP | PCT | Qualification |
|---|---|---|---|---|---|---|---|---|---|
| 1 | Sydney Kings | 28 | 19 | 9 | 2679 | 2468 | 108.5 | 67.86 | Semifinals |
| 2 | New Zealand Breakers | 28 | 18 | 10 | 2423 | 2246 | 107.9 | 64.29 | Semifinals |
| 3 | Cairns Taipans | 28 | 18 | 10 | 2455 | 2376 | 103.3 | 64.29 | Play-in |
| 4 | Tasmania JackJumpers | 28 | 16 | 12 | 2385 | 2305 | 103.5 | 57.14 | Play-in |
| 5 | South East Melbourne Phoenix | 28 | 15 | 13 | 2553 | 2512 | 101.6 | 53.57 | Play-in |
| 6 | Perth Wildcats | 28 | 15 | 13 | 2580 | 2568 | 100.5 | 53.57 | Play-in |
| 7 | Melbourne United | 28 | 15 | 13 | 2434 | 2424 | 100.4 | 53.57 | |
| 8 | Adelaide 36ers | 28 | 13 | 15 | 2546 | 2597 | 98.0 | 46.43 | |
| 9 | Brisbane Bullets | 28 | 8 | 20 | 2365 | 2600 | 91.0 | 28.57 | |
| 10 | Illawarra Hawks | 28 | 3 | 25 | 2261 | 2585 | 87.5 | 10.71 | |

Updated to match(es) played on 5 February 2023. Source: NBL.com.au

Play-in / Seeding qualifier
5 | S.E. Melbourne Phoenix | 99
6 | Perth Wildcats | 106
3 | Cairns Taipans | 79
4 | Tasmania JackJumpers | 87

Play-in game
3 | Cairns Taipans | 91
6 | Perth Wildcats | 78

Semifinals
1 | Sydney Kings | 95 | 82 | 79
3 | Cairns Taipans | 87 | 93 | 64
2 | New Zealand Breakers | 88 | 78 | 92
4 | Tasmania JackJumpers | 68 | 89 | 77

Grand Final
1 | Sydney Kings | 87 | 81 | 91 | 70 | 77
2 | New Zealand Breakers | 95 | 74 | 68 | 80 | 69

=== 2021–22 ===
| Pos | Team | Pld | W | L | GF | GA | PP | PCT | Qualification |
|---|---|---|---|---|---|---|---|---|---|
| 1 | Melbourne United | 28 | 20 | 8 | 2455 | 2244 | 109.4 | 71.43 | Semifinals |
| 2 | Illawarra Hawks | 28 | 19 | 9 | 2498 | 2345 | 106.5 | 67.86 | Semifinals |
| 3 | Sydney Kings | 28 | 19 | 9 | 2397 | 2313 | 103.6 | 67.86 | Semifinals |
| 4 | Tasmania JackJumpers | 28 | 17 | 11 | 2230 | 2220 | 100.5 | 60.71 | Semifinals |
| 5 | Perth Wildcats | 28 | 16 | 12 | 2495 | 2377 | 105.0 | 57.14 | |
| 6 | South East Melbourne Phoenix | 28 | 15 | 13 | 2456 | 2424 | 101.3 | 53.57 | |
| 7 | Adelaide 36ers | 28 | 10 | 18 | 2283 | 2346 | 97.3 | 35.71 | |
| 8 | Brisbane Bullets | 28 | 10 | 18 | 2379 | 2500 | 95.2 | 35.71 | |
| 9 | Cairns Taipans | 28 | 9 | 19 | 2228 | 2408 | 92.5 | 32.14 | |
| 10 | New Zealand Breakers | 28 | 5 | 23 | 2234 | 2478 | 90.2 | 17.86 | |

Updated to match(es) played on 24 April 2022. Source: NBL.com.au

Semifinals
1 | Melbourne United | 74 | 72 | 73
4 | Tasmania JackJumpers | 63 | 79 | 76
2 | Illawarra Hawks | 79 | 87 | X
3 | Sydney Kings | 89 | 99 | X

Grand Final
3 | Sydney Kings | 95 | 90 | 97 | X | X
4 | Tasmania JackJumpers | 78 | 86 | 88 | X | X

=== 2020–21 ===
| Pos | Team | Pld | W | L | GF | GA | PP | PCT | Qualification |
|---|---|---|---|---|---|---|---|---|---|
| 1 | Melbourne United | 36 | 28 | 8 | 3189 | 2956 | 107.9 | 77.78 | Semifinals |
| 2 | Perth Wildcats | 36 | 25 | 11 | 3133 | 2900 | 108.0 | 69.44 | Semifinals |
| 3 | Illawarra Hawks | 36 | 20 | 16 | 2962 | 2954 | 100.3 | 55.56 | Semifinals |
| 4 | South East Melbourne Phoenix | 36 | 19 | 17 | 3217 | 3124 | 103.0 | 52.78 | Semifinals |
| 5 | Sydney Kings | 36 | 19 | 17 | 3112 | 3087 | 100.8 | 52.78 | |
| 6 | Brisbane Bullets | 36 | 18 | 18 | 3204 | 3274 | 97.9 | 50.00 | |
| 7 | Adelaide 36ers | 36 | 13 | 23 | 2985 | 3156 | 94.6 | 36.11 | |
| 8 | New Zealand Breakers | 36 | 12 | 24 | 2937 | 3021 | 97.2 | 33.33 | |
| 9 | Cairns Taipans | 36 | 8 | 28 | 2940 | 3207 | 91.7 | 22.22 | |

Updated to match(es) played on 8 June 2021. Source: NBL.com.au

Semifinals
1 | Melbourne United | 96 | 79 | 84
4 | S.E. Melbourne Phoenix | 78 | 90 | 74
2 | Perth Wildcats | 72 | 75 | 79
3 | Illawarra Hawks | 74 | 71 | 71

Grand Final
1 | Melbourne United | 73 | 83 | 81 | X | X
2 | Perth Wildcats | 70 | 74 | 76 | X | X

=== 2021 Cup ===
| Pos | Team | Pld | W | L | PF | PA | PP | BP | Pts | Qualification |
|---|---|---|---|---|---|---|---|---|---|---|
| 1 | Perth Wildcats | 8 | 7 | 1 | 745 | 680 | 109.6 | 18.5 | 39.5 | Champions |
| 2 | South East Melbourne Phoenix | 8 | 5 | 3 | 748 | 704 | 106.3 | 18.5 | 33.5 | Second Place |
| 3 | Brisbane Bullets | 8 | 5 | 3 | 795 | 785 | 101.3 | 17.5 | 32.5 | Third Place |
| 4 | Melbourne United | 8 | 4 | 4 | 674 | 677 | 99.6 | 17 | 29 | |
| 5 | Sydney Kings | 8 | 4 | 4 | 747 | 729 | 102.5 | 16.5 | 28.5 | |
| 6 | Illawarra Hawks | 8 | 4 | 4 | 698 | 693 | 100.7 | 16.5 | 28.5 | |
| 7 | New Zealand Breakers | 8 | 3 | 5 | 703 | 710 | 99.0 | 13 | 22 | |
| 8 | Adelaide 36ers | 8 | 2 | 6 | 673 | 751 | 89.6 | 14 | 20 | |
| 9 | Cairns Taipans | 8 | 2 | 6 | 677 | 731 | 92.6 | 12.5 | 18.5 | |

Updated to match(es) played on 14 March 2021. Source: NBL.com.au

=== 2019–20 ===
| Pos | Team | Pld | W | L | GF | GA | PP | PCT | Qualification |
|---|---|---|---|---|---|---|---|---|---|
| 1 | Sydney Kings | 28 | 20 | 8 | 2642 | 2472 | 106.9 | 71.43 | Semifinals |
| 2 | Perth Wildcats | 28 | 19 | 9 | 2529 | 2409 | 105.0 | 67.86 | Semifinals |
| 3 | Cairns Taipans | 28 | 16 | 12 | 2587 | 2547 | 101.6 | 57.14 | Semifinals |
| 4 | Melbourne United | 28 | 15 | 13 | 2638 | 2560 | 103.0 | 53.57 | Semifinals |
| 5 | Brisbane Bullets | 28 | 15 | 13 | 2607 | 2557 | 102.0 | 53.57 | |
| 6 | New Zealand Breakers | 28 | 15 | 13 | 2514 | 2468 | 101.9 | 53.57 | |
| 7 | Adelaide 36ers | 28 | 12 | 16 | 2654 | 2768 | 95.9 | 42.86 | |
| 8 | South East Melbourne Phoenix | 28 | 9 | 19 | 2671 | 2761 | 96.7 | 32.14 | |
| 9 | Illawarra Hawks | 28 | 5 | 23 | 2354 | 2654 | 88.7 | 17.86 | |

Updated to match(es) played on 16 February 2020. Source: NBL.com.au

Semifinals
1 | Sydney Kings | 86 | 80 | 89
4 | Melbourne United | 80 | 125 | 87
2 | Perth Wildcats | 108 | 74 | 93
3 | Cairns Taipans | 107 | 85 | 82

Grand Final
1 | Sydney Kings | 86 | 97 | 96
2 | Perth Wildcats | 88 | 83 | 111

=== 2018–19 ===
| Pos | Team | Pld | W | L | GF | GA | PP | PCT | Qualification |
|---|---|---|---|---|---|---|---|---|---|
| 1 | Perth Wildcats | 28 | 18 | 10 | 2499 | 2355 | 106.1 | 64.29 | Semifinals |
| 2 | Melbourne United | 28 | 18 | 10 | 2586 | 2478 | 104.4 | 64.29 | Semifinals |
| 3 | Sydney Kings | 28 | 18 | 10 | 2438 | 2380 | 102.4 | 64.29 | Semifinals |
| 4 | Brisbane Bullets | 28 | 14 | 14 | 2503 | 2480 | 100.9 | 50.00 | Semifinals |
| 5 | Adelaide 36ers | 28 | 14 | 14 | 2687 | 2681 | 100.2 | 50.00 | |
| 6 | New Zealand Breakers | 28 | 12 | 16 | 2649 | 2641 | 100.3 | 42.86 | |
| 7 | Illawarra Hawks | 28 | 12 | 16 | 2493 | 2664 | 93.6 | 42.86 | |
| 8 | Cairns Taipans | 28 | 6 | 22 | 2400 | 2576 | 93.2 | 21.43 | |

Updated to match(es) played on 17 February 2019. Source: NBL.com.au

Semifinals
1 | Perth Wildcats | 89 | 84 | X
4 | Brisbane Bullets | 59 | 79 | X
2 | Melbourne United | 95 | 90 | X
3 | Sydney Kings | 73 | 76 | X

Grand Final
1 | Perth Wildcats | 81 | 74 | 96 | 97 | X
2 | Melbourne United | 71 | 92 | 67 | 82 | X

=== 2017–18 ===
| Pos | Team | Pld | W | L | GF | GA | PP | PCT | Qualification |
|---|---|---|---|---|---|---|---|---|---|
| 1 | Melbourne United | 28 | 20 | 8 | 2434 | 2298 | 105.9 | 71.43 | Semifinals |
| 2 | Adelaide 36ers | 28 | 18 | 10 | 2654 | 2527 | 105.0 | 64.29 | Semifinals |
| 3 | Perth Wildcats | 28 | 16 | 12 | 2388 | 2271 | 105.2 | 57.14 | Semifinals |
| 4 | New Zealand Breakers | 28 | 15 | 13 | 2364 | 2387 | 99.0 | 53.57 | Semifinals |
| 5 | Illawarra Hawks | 28 | 12 | 16 | 2474 | 2539 | 97.4 | 42.86 | |
| 6 | Cairns Taipans | 28 | 11 | 17 | 2215 | 2281 | 97.1 | 39.29 | |
| 7 | Sydney Kings | 28 | 11 | 17 | 2418 | 2504 | 96.6 | 39.29 | |
| 8 | Brisbane Bullets | 28 | 9 | 19 | 2347 | 2487 | 94.4 | 32.14 | |

Updated to match(es) played on 18 February 2018. Source: NBL.com.au

Semifinals
1 | Melbourne United | 88 | 88 | X
4 | New Zealand Breakers | 77 | 86 | X
2 | Adelaide 36ers | 109 | 89 | X
3 | Perth Wildcats | 74 | 88 | X

Grand Final
1 | Melbourne United | 107 | 95 | 101 | 81 | 100
2 | Adelaide 36ers | 96 | 110 | 98 | 90 | 82

=== 2016–17 ===
| Pos | Team | Pld | W | L | GF | GA | PP | PCT | Qualification |
|---|---|---|---|---|---|---|---|---|---|
| 1 | Adelaide 36ers | 28 | 17 | 11 | 2582 | 2505 | 103.1 | 60.71 | Semifinals |
| 2 | Cairns Taipans | 28 | 15 | 13 | 2305 | 2301 | 100.2 | 53.57 | Semifinals |
| 3 | Perth Wildcats | 28 | 15 | 13 | 2294 | 2257 | 101.6 | 53.57 | Semifinals |
| 4 | Illawarra Hawks | 28 | 15 | 13 | 2486 | 2444 | 101.7 | 53.57 | Semifinals |
| 5 | New Zealand Breakers | 28 | 14 | 14 | 2353 | 2387 | 98.6 | 50.00 | |
| 6 | Melbourne United | 28 | 13 | 15 | 2351 | 2337 | 100.6 | 46.43 | |
| 7 | Sydney Kings | 28 | 13 | 15 | 2295 | 2311 | 99.3 | 46.43 | |
| 8 | Brisbane Bullets | 28 | 10 | 18 | 2268 | 2392 | 94.8 | 35.71 | |

Updated to match(es) played on 12 February 2017. Source: NBL.com.au

Semifinals
1 | Adelaide 36ers | 93 | 94 | 98
4 | Illawarra Hawks | 78 | 100 | 106
2 | Cairns Taipans | 69 | 66 | X
3 | Perth Wildcats | 91 | 74 | X

Grand Final
3 | Perth Wildcats | 89 | 89 | 95 | X | X
4 | Illawarra Hawks | 77 | 77 | 86 | X | X

=== 2015–16 ===
| Pos | Team | Pld | W | L | GF | GA | PP | PCT | Qualification |
|---|---|---|---|---|---|---|---|---|---|
| 1 | Melbourne United | 28 | 18 | 10 | 2384 | 2342 | 101.8 | 64.29 | Semifinals |
| 2 | Perth Wildcats | 28 | 18 | 10 | 2391 | 2266 | 105.5 | 64.29 | Semifinals |
| 3 | Illawarra Hawks | 28 | 17 | 11 | 2637 | 2486 | 106.1 | 60.71 | Semifinals |
| 4 | New Zealand Breakers | 28 | 16 | 12 | 2357 | 2282 | 103.3 | 57.14 | Semifinals |
| 5 | Adelaide 36ers | 28 | 14 | 14 | 2495 | 2500 | 99.8 | 50.00 | |
| 6 | Cairns Taipans | 28 | 12 | 16 | 2238 | 2354 | 95.1 | 42.86 | |
| 7 | Townsville Crocodiles | 28 | 11 | 17 | 2271 | 2390 | 95.0 | 39.29 | |
| 8 | Sydney Kings | 28 | 6 | 22 | 2416 | 2569 | 94.0 | 21.43 | |

Updated to match(es) played on 14 February 2016. Source: NBL.com.au

Semifinals
1 | Melbourne United | 82 | 78 | X
4 | New Zealand Breakers | 91 | 91 | X
2 | Perth Wildcats | 80 | 87 | 89
3 | Illawarra Hawks | 68 | 104 | 74

Grand Final
2 | Perth Wildcats | 82 | 68 | 75
4 | New Zealand Breakers | 76 | 72 | 52

=== 2014–15 ===
| Pos | Team | Pld | W | L | GF | GA | PP | PCT | Qualification |
|---|---|---|---|---|---|---|---|---|---|
| 1 | Cairns Taipans | 28 | 21 | 7 | 2275 | 2117 | 107.5 | 75.00 | Semifinals |
| 2 | New Zealand Breakers | 28 | 19 | 9 | 2343 | 2275 | 103.0 | 67.86 | Semifinals |
| 3 | Adelaide 36ers | 28 | 17 | 11 | 2501 | 2478 | 100.9 | 60.71 | Semifinals |
| 4 | Perth Wildcats | 28 | 16 | 12 | 2260 | 2171 | 104.1 | 57.14 | Semifinals |
| 5 | Melbourne United | 28 | 13 | 15 | 2333 | 2379 | 98.1 | 46.43 | |
| 6 | Townsville Crocodiles | 28 | 11 | 17 | 2343 | 2341 | 100.1 | 39.29 | |
| 7 | Sydney Kings | 28 | 9 | 19 | 2320 | 2408 | 96.3 | 32.14 | |
| 8 | Wollongong Hawks | 28 | 6 | 22 | 2154 | 2360 | 91.3 | 21.43 | |

Updated to match(es) played on 22 February 2015. Source: NBL.com.au

Semifinals
1 | Cairns Taipans | 71 | 80 | X
4 | Perth Wildcats | 64 | 66 | X
2 | New Zealand Breakers | 111 | 94 | X
3 | Adelaide 36ers | 82 | 83 | X

Grand Final
1 | Cairns Taipans | 71 | 81 | X
2 | New Zealand Breakers | 86 | 83 | X

=== 2013–14 ===
| Pos | Team | Pld | W | L | GF | GA | PP | PCT | Qualification |
|---|---|---|---|---|---|---|---|---|---|
| 1 | Perth Wildcats | 28 | 21 | 7 | 2419 | 2177 | 111.1 | 75.00 | Semifinals |
| 2 | Adelaide 36ers | 28 | 18 | 10 | 2527 | 2469 | 102.3 | 64.29 | Semifinals |
| 3 | Melbourne Tigers | 28 | 15 | 13 | 2299 | 2292 | 100.3 | 53.57 | Semifinals |
| 4 | Wollongong Hawks | 28 | 13 | 15 | 2295 | 2333 | 98.4 | 46.43 | Semifinals |
| 5 | Sydney Kings | 28 | 12 | 16 | 2312 | 2414 | 95.8 | 42.86 | |
| 6 | Cairns Taipans | 28 | 12 | 16 | 2304 | 2349 | 98.1 | 42.86 | |
| 7 | New Zealand Breakers | 28 | 11 | 17 | 2474 | 2493 | 99.2 | 39.29 | |
| 8 | Townsville Crocodiles | 28 | 10 | 18 | 2369 | 2472 | 95.8 | 35.71 | |

Updated to match(es) played on 23 March 2014. Source: NBL.com.au

Semifinals
1 | Perth Wildcats | 91 | 80 | X
4 | Wollongong Hawks | 79 | 61 | X
2 | Adelaide 36ers | 101 | 87 | 102
3 | Melbourne Tigers | 85 | 98 | 63

Grand Final
1 | Perth Wildcats | 92 | 84 | 93
2 | Adelaide 36ers | 85 | 89 | 59

=== 2012–13 ===
| Pos | Team | Pld | W | L | GF | GA | PP | PCT | Qualification |
|---|---|---|---|---|---|---|---|---|---|
| 1 | New Zealand Breakers | 28 | 24 | 4 | 2296 | 2070 | 110.9 | 85.71 | Semifinals |
| 2 | Perth Wildcats | 28 | 22 | 6 | 2195 | 1885 | 116.4 | 78.57 | Semifinals |
| 3 | Wollongong Hawks | 28 | 13 | 15 | 2104 | 2087 | 100.8 | 46.43 | Semifinals |
| 4 | Sydney Kings | 28 | 12 | 16 | 2102 | 2222 | 94.6 | 42.86 | Semifinals |
| 5 | Melbourne Tigers | 28 | 12 | 16 | 2092 | 2163 | 96.7 | 42.86 | |
| 6 | Cairns Taipans | 28 | 11 | 17 | 2074 | 2137 | 97.1 | 39.29 | |
| 7 | Townsville Crocodiles | 28 | 10 | 18 | 2063 | 2242 | 92.0 | 35.71 | |
| 8 | Adelaide 36ers | 28 | 8 | 20 | 2091 | 2211 | 94.6 | 28.57 | |

Updated to match(es) played on 24 March 2013. Source: NBL.com.au

Semifinals
1 | New Zealand Breakers | 81 | 99 | X
4 | Sydney Kings | 64 | 88 | X
2 | Perth Wildcats | 93 | 85 | X
3 | Wollongong Hawks | 65 | 81 | X

Grand Final
1 | New Zealand Breakers | 79 | 70 | X
2 | Perth Wildcats | 67 | 66 | X

=== 2011–12 ===
| Pos | Team | Pld | W | L | GF | GA | PP | PCT | Qualification |
|---|---|---|---|---|---|---|---|---|---|
| 1 | New Zealand Breakers | 28 | 21 | 7 | 2382 | 2177 | 109.4 | 75.00 | Semifinals |
| 2 | Perth Wildcats | 28 | 19 | 9 | 2434 | 2171 | 112.1 | 67.86 | Semifinals |
| 3 | Gold Coast Blaze | 28 | 17 | 11 | 2387 | 2253 | 105.9 | 60.71 | Semifinals |
| 4 | Townsville Crocodiles | 28 | 15 | 13 | 2213 | 2210 | 100.1 | 53.57 | Semifinals |
| 5 | Cairns Taipans | 28 | 15 | 13 | 2025 | 2107 | 96.1 | 53.57 | |
| 6 | Melbourne Tigers | 28 | 11 | 17 | 2156 | 2239 | 96.3 | 39.29 | |
| 7 | Sydney Kings | 28 | 11 | 17 | 2279 | 2423 | 94.1 | 39.29 | |
| 8 | Wollongong Hawks | 28 | 9 | 19 | 2093 | 2232 | 93.8 | 32.14 | |
| 9 | Adelaide 36ers | 28 | 8 | 20 | 2297 | 2454 | 93.6 | 28.57 | |

Updated to match(es) played on 25 March 2012. Source: NBL.com.au

Semifinals
1 | New Zealand Breakers | 82 | 94 | 97
4 | Townsville Crocodiles | 99 | 83 | 80
2 | Perth Wildcats | 85 | 70 | 88
3 | Gold Coast Blaze | 70 | 72 | 67

Grand Final
1 | New Zealand Breakers | 104 | 86 | 79
2 | Perth Wildcats | 98 | 87 | 73

=== 2010–11 ===
| Pos | Team | Pld | W | L | GF | GA | PP | PCT | Qualification |
|---|---|---|---|---|---|---|---|---|---|
| 1 | New Zealand Breakers | 28 | 22 | 6 | 2463 | 2367 | 104.1 | 78.57 | Semifinals |
| 2 | Townsville Crocodiles | 28 | 17 | 11 | 2225 | 2163 | 102.9 | 60.71 | Semifinals |
| 3 | Cairns Taipans | 28 | 16 | 12 | 2186 | 2107 | 103.7 | 57.14 | Semifinals |
| 4 | Perth Wildcats | 28 | 16 | 12 | 2380 | 2192 | 108.6 | 57.14 | Semifinals |
| 5 | Wollongong Hawks | 28 | 15 | 13 | 2272 | 2209 | 102.9 | 53.57 | |
| 6 | Gold Coast Blaze | 28 | 13 | 15 | 2396 | 2440 | 98.2 | 46.43 | |
| 7 | Melbourne Tigers | 28 | 10 | 18 | 2209 | 2357 | 93.7 | 35.71 | |
| 8 | Adelaide 36ers | 28 | 9 | 19 | 2212 | 2362 | 93.6 | 32.14 | |
| 9 | Sydney Kings | 28 | 8 | 20 | 2171 | 2317 | 93.7 | 28.57 | |

Updated to match(es) played on 2 April 2011. Source: NBL.com.au

Semifinals
1 | New Zealand Breakers | 78 | 93 | 99
4 | Perth Wildcats | 101 | 89 | 83
2 | Townsville Crocodiles | 76 | 57 | 83
3 | Cairns Taipans | 73 | 74 | 93

Grand Final
1 | New Zealand Breakers | 85 | 81 | 71
3 | Cairns Taipans | 67 | 85 | 53

=== 2009–10 ===
| Pos | Team | Pld | W | L | GF | GA | PP | PCT | Qualification |
|---|---|---|---|---|---|---|---|---|---|
| 1 | Perth Wildcats | 28 | 17 | 11 | 2401 | 2285 | 105.1 | 60.71 | Semifinals |
| 2 | Wollongong Hawks | 28 | 16 | 12 | 2299 | 2270 | 101.3 | 57.14 | Semifinals |
| 3 | Townsville Crocodiles | 28 | 16 | 12 | 2418 | 2369 | 102.1 | 57.14 | Semifinals |
| 4 | Gold Coast Blaze | 28 | 16 | 12 | 2410 | 2376 | 101.4 | 57.14 | Semifinals |
| 5 | New Zealand Breakers | 28 | 15 | 13 | 2415 | 2340 | 103.2 | 53.57 | |
| 6 | Melbourne Tigers | 28 | 11 | 17 | 2338 | 2423 | 96.5 | 39.29 | |
| 7 | Cairns Taipans | 28 | 11 | 17 | 2092 | 2239 | 93.4 | 39.29 | |
| 8 | Adelaide 36ers | 28 | 10 | 18 | 2353 | 2424 | 97.1 | 35.71 | |

Updated to match(es) played on 14 February 2010. Source: NBL.com.au

Semifinals
1 | Perth Wildcats | 81 | 82 | X
4 | Gold Coast Blaze | 68 | 78 | X
2 | Wollongong Hawks | 87 | 53 | 88
3 | Townsville Crocodiles | 68 | 82 | 76

Grand Final
1 | Perth Wildcats | 75 | 63 | 96
2 | Wollongong Hawks | 64 | 75 | 72

=== 2008–09 ===
| Pos | Team | Pld | W | L | GF | GA | PP | PCT | Qualification |
|---|---|---|---|---|---|---|---|---|---|
| 1 | South Dragons | 30 | 22 | 8 | 2968 | 2692 | 110.3 | 73.33 | Semifinals |
| 2 | Melbourne Tigers | 30 | 20 | 10 | 3030 | 2846 | 106.5 | 66.67 | Semifinals |
| 3 | New Zealand Breakers | 30 | 18 | 12 | 3087 | 2910 | 106.1 | 60.00 | Elimination Finals |
| 4 | Perth Wildcats | 30 | 17 | 13 | 2880 | 2822 | 102.1 | 56.67 | Elimination Finals |
| 5 | Townsville Crocodiles | 30 | 17 | 13 | 2956 | 2978 | 99.3 | 56.67 | Elimination Finals |
| 6 | Adelaide 36ers | 30 | 15 | 15 | 2956 | 2929 | 100.9 | 50.00 | Elimination Finals |
| 7 | Wollongong Hawks | 30 | 11 | 19 | 2924 | 3077 | 95.0 | 36.67 | |
| 8 | Sydney Spirit | 30 | 11 | 19 | 2823 | 2987 | 94.5 | 36.67 | |
| 9 | Cairns Taipans | 30 | 11 | 19 | 2589 | 2767 | 93.6 | 36.67 | |
| 10 | Gold Coast Blaze | 30 | 8 | 22 | 2927 | 3132 | 93.5 | 26.67 | |

Updated to match(es) played on 14 February 2009. Source: NBL.com.au

Elimination Finals
4 | Perth Wildcats | 96
5 | Townsville Crocodiles | 103
3 | New Zealand Breakers | 131
6 | Adelaide 36ers | 101

Semifinals
1 | South Dragons | 94 | 77 | 101
5 | Townsville Crocodiles | 81 | 82 | 78
2 | Melbourne Tigers | 117 | 103 | X
3 | New Zealand Breakers | 99 | 97 | X

Grand Final
1 | South Dragons | 93 | 83 | 84 | 95 | 102
2 | Melbourne Tigers | 81 | 88 | 67 | 108 | 81

=== 2007–08 ===
| Pos | Team | Pld | W | L | GF | GA | PP | PCT | Qualification |
|---|---|---|---|---|---|---|---|---|---|
| 1 | Sydney Kings | 30 | 27 | 3 | 3058 | 2721 | 112.4 | 90.00 | Semifinals |
| 2 | Melbourne Tigers | 30 | 22 | 8 | 3093 | 2904 | 106.5 | 73.33 | Semifinals |
| 3 | Brisbane Bullets | 30 | 20 | 10 | 3407 | 3145 | 108.3 | 66.67 | Elimination Finals |
| 4 | Perth Wildcats | 30 | 18 | 12 | 2908 | 2731 | 106.5 | 60.00 | Elimination Finals |
| 5 | Townsville Crocodiles | 30 | 17 | 13 | 2961 | 2927 | 101.2 | 56.67 | Elimination Finals |
| 6 | Cairns Taipans | 30 | 16 | 14 | 2927 | 2849 | 102.7 | 53.33 | Elimination Finals |
| 7 | New Zealand Breakers | 30 | 16 | 14 | 3026 | 3059 | 98.9 | 53.33 | Elimination Finals |
| 8 | Gold Coast Blaze | 30 | 15 | 15 | 2865 | 2892 | 99.1 | 50.00 | Elimination Finals |
| 9 | Adelaide 36ers | 30 | 14 | 16 | 3130 | 3124 | 100.2 | 46.67 | |
| 10 | West Sydney Razorbacks | 30 | 10 | 20 | 3097 | 3248 | 95.4 | 33.33 | |
| 11 | Wollongong Hawks | 30 | 9 | 21 | 2928 | 3128 | 93.6 | 30.00 | |
| 12 | Singapore Slingers | 30 | 6 | 24 | 2829 | 3207 | 88.2 | 20.00 | |
| 13 | South Dragons | 30 | 5 | 25 | 2904 | 3198 | 90.8 | 16.67 | |

Updated to match(es) played on 16 February 2008. Source: NBL.com.au

Elimination Finals
5 | Townsville Crocodiles | 97
8 | Gold Coast Blaze | 89
6 | Cairns Taipans | 78
7 | New Zealand Breakers | 100

Quarterfinals
4 | Perth Wildcats | 96
5 | Townsville Crocodiles | 78
3 | Brisbane Bullets | 106
7 | New Zealand Breakers | 89

Semifinals
1 | Sydney Kings | 101 | 85 | 109
4 | Perth Wildcats | 98 | 94 | 77
2 | Melbourne Tigers | 116 | 115 | X
3 | Brisbane Bullets | 98 | 112 | X

Grand Final
1 | Sydney Kings | 95 | 93 | 87 | 90 | 73
2 | Melbourne Tigers | 74 | 104 | 89 | 87 | 85

=== 2006–07 ===
| Pos | Team | Pld | W | L | GF | GA | PP | PCT | Qualification |
|---|---|---|---|---|---|---|---|---|---|
| 1 | Brisbane Bullets | 33 | 28 | 5 | 3804 | 3326 | 114.4 | 84.85 | Semifinals |
| 2 | Melbourne Tigers | 33 | 25 | 8 | 3453 | 3228 | 107.0 | 75.76 | Semifinals |
| 3 | Perth Wildcats | 33 | 23 | 10 | 3331 | 3113 | 107.0 | 69.70 | Elimination Finals |
| 4 | Sydney Kings | 33 | 20 | 13 | 3236 | 3119 | 103.8 | 60.61 | Elimination Finals |
| 5 | Townsville Crocodiles | 33 | 19 | 14 | 3626 | 3516 | 103.1 | 57.58 | Elimination Finals |
| 6 | Cairns Taipans | 33 | 17 | 16 | 3292 | 3284 | 100.2 | 51.52 | Elimination Finals |
| 7 | South Dragons | 33 | 15 | 18 | 3418 | 3514 | 97.3 | 45.45 | Elimination Finals |
| 8 | Singapore Slingers | 33 | 13 | 20 | 3297 | 3435 | 96.0 | 39.39 | Elimination Finals |
| 9 | Wollongong Hawks | 33 | 11 | 22 | 3237 | 3395 | 95.3 | 33.33 | |
| 10 | New Zealand Breakers | 33 | 11 | 22 | 3382 | 3538 | 95.6 | 33.33 | |
| 11 | Adelaide 36ers | 33 | 11 | 22 | 3326 | 3555 | 93.6 | 33.33 | |
| 12 | West Sydney Razorbacks | 33 | 5 | 28 | 3221 | 3600 | 89.5 | 15.15 | |

Updated to match(es) played on 11 February 2007. Source: NBL.com.au

Elimination Finals
5 | Townsville Crocodiles | 106
8 | Singapore Slingers | 93
6 | Cairns Taipans | 118
7 | South Dragons | 97

Quarterfinals
4 | Sydney Kings | 122
5 | Townsville Crocodiles | 89
3 | Perth Wildcats | 78
6 | Cairns Taipans | 82

Semifinals
1 | Brisbane Bullets | 91 | 93 | X
4 | Sydney Kings | 84 | 86 | X
2 | Melbourne Tigers | 100 | 95 | X
6 | Cairns Taipans | 87 | 87 | X

Grand Final
1 | Brisbane Bullets | 98 | 91 | 113 | 103 | X
2 | Melbourne Tigers | 95 | 105 | 93 | 94 | X

=== 2005–06 ===
| Pos | Team | Pld | W | L | GF | GA | PP | PCT | Qualification |
|---|---|---|---|---|---|---|---|---|---|
| 1 | Sydney Kings | 32 | 26 | 6 | 3472 | 3094 | 112.2 | 81.25 | Semifinals |
| 2 | Melbourne Tigers | 32 | 25 | 7 | 3305 | 2984 | 110.8 | 78.13 | Semifinals |
| 3 | Wollongong Hawks | 32 | 19 | 13 | 3231 | 3101 | 104.2 | 59.38 | Elimination Finals |
| 4 | Adelaide 36ers | 32 | 19 | 13 | 3222 | 3277 | 98.3 | 59.38 | Elimination Finals |
| 5 | Cairns Taipans | 32 | 18 | 14 | 3200 | 3107 | 103.0 | 56.25 | Elimination Finals |
| 6 | Brisbane Bullets | 32 | 17 | 15 | 3373 | 3280 | 102.8 | 53.13 | Elimination Finals |
| 7 | Perth Wildcats | 32 | 16 | 16 | 3219 | 3168 | 101.6 | 50.00 | Elimination Finals |
| 8 | Hunter Pirates | 32 | 13 | 19 | 3126 | 3315 | 94.3 | 40.63 | Elimination Finals |
| 9 | New Zealand Breakers | 32 | 9 | 23 | 3179 | 3471 | 91.6 | 28.13 | |
| 10 | Townsville Crocodiles | 32 | 9 | 23 | 3283 | 3483 | 94.3 | 28.13 | |
| 11 | West Sydney Razorbacks | 32 | 5 | 27 | 2994 | 3324 | 90.1 | 15.63 | |

Updated to match(es) played on 5 February 2006. Source: NBL.com.au

Elimination Finals
5 | Cairns Taipans | 88
8 | Hunter Pirates | 80
6 | Brisbane Bullets | 91
7 | Perth Wildcats | 96

Quarterfinals
4 | Adelaide 36ers | 103
5 | Cairns Taipans | 106
3 | Wollongong Hawks | 101
7 | Perth Wildcats | 121

Semifinals
1 | Sydney Kings | 112 | 84 | X
5 | Cairns Taipans | 87 | 82 | X
2 | Melbourne Tigers | 94 | 106 | X
7 | Perth Wildcats | 78 | 101 | X

Grand Final
1 | Sydney Kings | 93 | 99 | 83 | X | X
2 | Melbourne Tigers | 100 | 103 | 88 | X | X

=== 2004–05 ===
| Pos | Team | Pld | W | L | GF | GA | PP | PCT | Qualification |
|---|---|---|---|---|---|---|---|---|---|
| 1 | Sydney Kings | 32 | 21 | 11 | 3234 | 3073 | 105.2 | 65.63 | Semifinals |
| 2 | Wollongong Hawks | 32 | 20 | 12 | 3164 | 2994 | 105.7 | 62.50 | Semifinals |
| 3 | Townsville Crocodiles | 32 | 19 | 13 | 3512 | 3398 | 103.4 | 59.38 | Elimination Finals |
| 4 | Adelaide 36ers | 32 | 19 | 13 | 3291 | 3185 | 103.3 | 59.38 | Elimination Finals |
| 5 | Brisbane Bullets | 32 | 17 | 15 | 3366 | 3314 | 101.6 | 53.13 | Elimination Finals |
| 6 | Melbourne Tigers | 32 | 17 | 15 | 3226 | 3205 | 100.7 | 53.13 | Elimination Finals |
| 7 | Perth Wildcats | 32 | 17 | 15 | 3211 | 3158 | 101.7 | 53.13 | Elimination Finals |
| 8 | Hunter Pirates | 32 | 15 | 17 | 3269 | 3319 | 98.5 | 46.88 | Elimination Finals |
| 9 | West Sydney Razorbacks | 32 | 11 | 21 | 3027 | 3203 | 94.5 | 34.38 | |
| 10 | Cairns Taipans | 32 | 11 | 21 | 3033 | 3213 | 94.4 | 34.38 | |
| 11 | New Zealand Breakers | 32 | 9 | 23 | 3098 | 3369 | 92.0 | 28.13 | |

Updated to match(es) played on 20 February 2005. Source: NBL.com.au

Elimination Finals
5 | Brisbane Bullets | 113
8 | Hunter Pirates | 99
6 | Melbourne Tigers | 108
7 | Perth Wildcats | 88

Quarterfinals
4 | Adelaide 36ers | 110
5 | Brisbane Bullets | 125
3 | Townsville Crocodiles | 112
6 | Melbourne Tigers | 100

Semifinals
1 | Sydney Kings | 113 | 111 | X
5 | Brisbane Bullets | 79 | 105 | X
2 | Wollongong Hawks | 100 | 109 | X
3 | Townsville Crocodiles | 84 | 105 | X

Grand Final
1 | Sydney Kings | 96 | 105 | 112 | X | X
2 | Wollongong Hawks | 73 | 80 | 85 | X | X

=== 2003–04 ===
| Pos | Team | Pld | W | L | GF | GA | PP | PCT | Qualification |
|---|---|---|---|---|---|---|---|---|---|
| 1 | Sydney Kings | 33 | 26 | 7 | 3425 | 3029 | 113.1 | 78.79 | Semifinals |
| 2 | Wollongong Hawks | 33 | 25 | 8 | 3391 | 3045 | 111.4 | 75.76 | Semifinals |
| 3 | West Sydney Razorbacks | 33 | 22 | 11 | 3330 | 3172 | 105.0 | 66.67 | Elimination Finals |
| 4 | Brisbane Bullets | 33 | 22 | 11 | 3463 | 3222 | 107.5 | 66.67 | Elimination Finals |
| 5 | Melbourne Tigers | 33 | 20 | 13 | 3296 | 3239 | 101.8 | 60.61 | Elimination Finals |
| 6 | Cairns Taipans | 33 | 16 | 17 | 3090 | 3025 | 102.1 | 48.48 | Elimination Finals |
| 7 | Perth Wildcats | 33 | 15 | 18 | 3296 | 3342 | 98.6 | 45.45 | Elimination Finals |
| 8 | Adelaide 36ers | 33 | 14 | 19 | 3359 | 3450 | 97.4 | 42.42 | Elimination Finals |
| 9 | Townsville Crocodiles | 33 | 13 | 20 | 3365 | 3455 | 97.4 | 39.39 | |
| 10 | New Zealand Breakers | 33 | 12 | 21 | 3016 | 3198 | 94.3 | 36.36 | |
| 11 | Victoria Giants | 33 | 11 | 22 | 3113 | 3388 | 91.9 | 33.33 | |
| 12 | Hunter Pirates | 33 | 2 | 31 | 3065 | 3644 | 84.1 | 6.06 | |

Updated to match(es) played on 29 February 2004. Source: NBL.com.au

Elimination Finals
5 | Melbourne Tigers | 111
8 | Adelaide 36ers | 107
6 | Cairns Taipans | 103
7 | Perth Wildcats | 96

Quarterfinals
4 | Brisbane Bullets | 112
5 | Melbourne Tigers | 101
3 | West Sydney Razorbacks | 110
6 | Cairns Taipans | 88

Semifinals
1 | Sydney Kings | 104 | 101 | X
4 | Brisbane Bullets | 100 | 96 | X
2 | Wollongong Hawks | 91 | 95 | X
3 | West Sydney Razorbacks | 107 | 110 | X

Grand Final
1 | Sydney Kings | 96 | 72 | 80 | 82 | 90
3 | West Sydney Razorbacks | 76 | 87 | 82 | 77 | 79

=== 2002–03 ===
| Pos | Team | Pld | W | L | GF | GA | PP | PCT | Qualification |
|---|---|---|---|---|---|---|---|---|---|
| 1 | Sydney Kings | 30 | 22 | 8 | 3166 | 2780 | 113.9 | 73.33 | Qualifying Finals |
| 2 | Perth Wildcats | 30 | 22 | 8 | 3175 | 2960 | 107.3 | 73.33 | Qualifying Finals |
| 3 | Townsville Crocodiles | 30 | 19 | 11 | 3068 | 3004 | 102.1 | 63.33 | Qualifying Finals |
| 4 | Wollongong Hawks | 30 | 18 | 12 | 3053 | 2897 | 105.4 | 60.00 | Qualifying Finals |
| 5 | Adelaide 36ers | 30 | 16 | 14 | 3198 | 3162 | 101.1 | 53.33 | Qualifying Finals |
| 6 | Melbourne Tigers | 30 | 15 | 15 | 2953 | 2908 | 101.5 | 50.00 | Qualifying Finals |
| 7 | West Sydney Razorbacks | 30 | 14 | 16 | 3020 | 3072 | 98.3 | 46.67 | |
| 8 | Cairns Taipans | 30 | 13 | 17 | 2897 | 2913 | 99.5 | 43.33 | |
| 9 | Canberra Cannons | 30 | 11 | 19 | 2832 | 3049 | 92.9 | 36.67 | |
| 10 | Victoria Giants | 30 | 9 | 21 | 2945 | 3225 | 91.3 | 30.00 | |
| 11 | Brisbane Bullets | 30 | 6 | 24 | 2797 | 3134 | 89.2 | 20.00 | |

Updated to match(es) played on 1 March 2003. Source: NBL.com.au

Qualifying Finals
1 | Sydney Kings | 101 | 104 | 114
6 | Melbourne Tigers | 89 | 108 | 89
2 | Perth Wildcats | 119 | 91 | 94
5 | Adelaide 36ers | 116 | 99 | 86
3 | Townsville Crocodiles | 87 | 101 | X
4 | Wollongong Hawks | 97 | 102 | X

Semifinals
1 | Sydney Kings | 124 | 91 | 114
3 | Townsville Crocodiles | 107 | 113 | 99
2 | Perth Wildcats | 121 | 113 | X
4 | Wollongong Hawks | 90 | 84 | X

Grand Final
1 | Sydney Kings | 98 | 117 | X
2 | Perth Wildcats | 94 | 101 | X

=== 2001–02 ===
| Pos | Team | Pld | W | L | GF | GA | PP | PCT | Qualification |
|---|---|---|---|---|---|---|---|---|---|
| 1 | Victoria Titans | 30 | 21 | 9 | 3127 | 2896 | 108.0 | 70.00 | Qualifying Finals |
| 2 | Perth Wildcats | 30 | 17 | 13 | 2947 | 2923 | 100.8 | 56.67 | Qualifying Finals |
| 3 | Adelaide 36ers | 30 | 17 | 13 | 3049 | 3064 | 99.5 | 56.67 | Qualifying Finals |
| 4 | Wollongong Hawks | 30 | 16 | 14 | 2903 | 2957 | 98.2 | 53.33 | Qualifying Finals |
| 5 | West Sydney Razorbacks | 30 | 16 | 14 | 3100 | 2963 | 104.6 | 53.33 | Qualifying Finals |
| 6 | Melbourne Tigers | 30 | 16 | 14 | 3072 | 3053 | 100.6 | 53.33 | Qualifying Finals |
| 7 | Brisbane Bullets | 30 | 14 | 16 | 3006 | 3047 | 98.7 | 46.67 | |
| 8 | Sydney Kings | 30 | 14 | 16 | 3244 | 3228 | 100.5 | 46.67 | |
| 9 | Townsville Crocodiles | 30 | 13 | 17 | 3225 | 3187 | 101.2 | 43.33 | |
| 10 | Canberra Cannons | 30 | 12 | 18 | 2863 | 2980 | 96.1 | 40.00 | |
| 11 | Cairns Taipans | 30 | 9 | 21 | 2706 | 2944 | 91.9 | 30.00 | |

Updated to match(es) played on 23 March 2002. Source: NBL.com.au

Qualifying Finals
1 | Victoria Titans | 113 | 105 | 97
6 | Melbourne Tigers | 107 | 107 | 103
2 | Perth Wildcats | 85 | 98 | X
5 | West Sydney Razorbacks | 106 | 109 | X
3 | Adelaide 36ers | 107 | 101 | X
4 | Wollongong Hawks | 90 | 95 | X

Semifinals
3 | Adelaide 36ers | 99 | 81 | 103
1 | Victoria Titans | 92 | 86 | 92
5 | West Sydney Razorbacks | 93 | 125 | 115
6 | Melbourne Tigers | 114 | 109 | 103

Grand Final
3 | Adelaide 36ers | 106 | 100 | 125
5 | West Sydney Razorbacks | 97 | 103 | 107

=== 2000–01 ===
| Pos | Team | Pld | W | L | GF | GA | PP | PCT | Qualification |
|---|---|---|---|---|---|---|---|---|---|
| 1 | Victoria Titans | 28 | 22 | 6 | 2962 | 2613 | 113.4 | 78.57 | Qualifying Finals |
| 2 | Townsville Crocodiles | 28 | 22 | 6 | 3039 | 2783 | 109.2 | 78.57 | Qualifying Finals |
| 3 | Perth Wildcats | 28 | 21 | 7 | 2968 | 2738 | 108.4 | 75.00 | Qualifying Finals |
| 4 | Wollongong Hawks | 28 | 21 | 7 | 2962 | 2801 | 105.7 | 75.00 | Qualifying Finals |
| 5 | Sydney Kings | 28 | 17 | 11 | 3008 | 2919 | 103.0 | 60.71 | Qualifying Finals |
| 6 | Adelaide 36ers | 28 | 16 | 12 | 2874 | 2701 | 106.4 | 57.14 | Qualifying Finals |
| 7 | Melbourne Tigers | 28 | 13 | 15 | 3052 | 3067 | 99.5 | 46.43 | |
| 8 | West Sydney Razorbacks | 28 | 9 | 19 | 2791 | 2942 | 94.9 | 32.14 | |
| 9 | Cairns Taipans | 28 | 6 | 22 | 2604 | 2861 | 91.0 | 21.43 | |
| 10 | Brisbane Bullets | 28 | 4 | 24 | 2554 | 2870 | 89.0 | 14.29 | |
| 11 | Canberra Cannons | 28 | 3 | 25 | 2507 | 3026 | 82.8 | 10.71 | |

Updated to match(es) played on 31 March 2001. Source: NBL.com.au

Qualifying Finals
1 | Victoria Titans | 101 | 83 | 103
6 | Adelaide 36ers | 96 | 96 | 115
2 | Townsville Crocodiles | 109 | 121 | 122
5 | Sydney Kings | 127 | 113 | 114
3 | Perth Wildcats | 90 | 106 | 88
4 | Wollongong Hawks | 97 | 95 | 98

Semifinals
2 | Townsville Crocodiles | 97 | 98 | 101
1 | Victoria Titans | 106 | 82 | 97
4 | Wollongong Hawks | 84 | 100 | 109
6 | Adelaide 36ers | 83 | 111 | 108

Grand Final
2 | Townsville Crocodiles | 101 | 114 | 94
4 | Wollongong Hawks | 104 | 97 | 97

=== 1999–2000 ===
| Pos | Team | Pld | W | L | GF | GA | PP | PCT | Qualification |
|---|---|---|---|---|---|---|---|---|---|
| 1 | Adelaide 36ers | 28 | 22 | 6 | 2822 | 2470 | 114.3 | 78.57 | Semifinals |
| 2 | Townsville Crocodiles | 28 | 22 | 6 | 2960 | 2606 | 113.6 | 78.57 | Semifinals |
| 3 | Perth Wildcats | 28 | 22 | 6 | 2677 | 2500 | 107.1 | 78.57 | Elimination Finals |
| 4 | Victoria Titans | 28 | 20 | 8 | 2523 | 2360 | 106.9 | 71.43 | Elimination Finals |
| 5 | Melbourne Tigers | 28 | 14 | 14 | 2767 | 2698 | 102.6 | 50.00 | Elimination Finals |
| 6 | West Sydney Razorbacks | 28 | 12 | 16 | 2708 | 2754 | 98.3 | 42.86 | Elimination Finals |
| 7 | Wollongong Hawks | 28 | 11 | 17 | 2581 | 2665 | 96.8 | 39.29 | |
| 8 | Canberra Cannons | 28 | 11 | 17 | 2552 | 2738 | 93.2 | 39.29 | |
| 9 | Sydney Kings | 28 | 11 | 17 | 2642 | 2702 | 97.8 | 39.29 | |
| 10 | Brisbane Bullets | 28 | 7 | 21 | 2343 | 2648 | 88.5 | 25.00 | |
| 11 | Cairns Taipans | 28 | 2 | 26 | 2191 | 2625 | 83.5 | 7.14 | |

Updated to match(es) played on 11 March 2000. Source: NBL.com.au

Elimination Finals
4 | Victoria Titans | 94 | 78 | 105
5 | Melbourne Tigers | 101 | 70 | 96
3 | Perth Wildcats | 80 | 99 | 82
6 | West Sydney Razorbacks | 91 | 88 | 74

Semifinals
1 | Adelaide 36ers | 86 | 95 | 89
4 | Victoria Titans | 101 | 72 | 93
2 | Townsville Crocodiles | 101 | 101 | 84
3 | Perth Wildcats | 104 | 78 | 104

Grand Final
3 | Perth Wildcats | 84 | 83 | X
4 | Victoria Titans | 78 | 76 | X

=== 1998–99 ===
| Pos | Team | Pld | W | L | GF | GA | PP | PCT | Qualification |
|---|---|---|---|---|---|---|---|---|---|
| 1 | Adelaide 36ers | 26 | 18 | 8 | 2572 | 2379 | 108.1 | 69.23 | Qualifying Finals |
| 2 | Melbourne Tigers | 26 | 17 | 9 | 2573 | 2472 | 104.1 | 65.38 | Qualifying Finals |
| 3 | Wollongong Hawks | 26 | 16 | 10 | 2332 | 2328 | 100.2 | 61.54 | Qualifying Finals |
| 4 | Victoria Titans | 26 | 16 | 10 | 2339 | 2245 | 104.2 | 61.54 | Qualifying Finals |
| 5 | Brisbane Bullets | 26 | 13 | 13 | 2476 | 2462 | 100.6 | 50.00 | Qualifying Finals |
| 6 | Perth Wildcats | 26 | 13 | 13 | 2463 | 2424 | 101.6 | 50.00 | Qualifying Finals |
| 7 | Townsville Crocodiles | 26 | 12 | 14 | 2429 | 2397 | 101.3 | 46.15 | |
| 8 | West Sydney Razorbacks | 26 | 12 | 14 | 2375 | 2446 | 97.1 | 46.15 | |
| 9 | Sydney Kings | 26 | 9 | 17 | 2411 | 2559 | 94.2 | 34.62 | |
| 10 | Newcastle Falcons | 26 | 9 | 17 | 2421 | 2544 | 95.2 | 34.62 | |
| 11 | Canberra Cannons | 26 | 8 | 18 | 2462 | 2597 | 94.8 | 30.77 | |

Updated to match(es) played on 14 March 1999. Source: NBL.com.au

Qualifying Finals
1 | Adelaide 36ers | 99 | 97 | X
6 | Perth Wildcats | 87 | 80 | X
2 | Melbourne Tigers | 100 | 98 | X
5 | Brisbane Bullets | 85 | 92 | X
3 | Wollongong Hawks | 65 | 82 | X
4 | Victoria Titans | 96 | 91 | X

Semifinals
1 | Adelaide 36ers | 93 | 99 | X
3 | Wollongong Hawks | 81 | 98 | X
2 | Melbourne Tigers | 77 | 87 | X
4 | Victoria Titans | 80 | 94 | X

Grand Final
1 | Adelaide 36ers | 104 | 82 | 80
4 | Victoria Titans | 94 | 88 | 69

=== 1998 ===
| Pos | Team | Pld | W | L | GF | GA | PP | PCT | Qualification |
|---|---|---|---|---|---|---|---|---|---|
| 1 | South East Melbourne Magic | 30 | 26 | 4 | 3016 | 2661 | 113.3 | 86.67 | Semifinals |
| 2 | Adelaide 36ers | 30 | 19 | 11 | 3114 | 2932 | 106.2 | 63.33 | Semifinals |
| 3 | Perth Wildcats | 30 | 17 | 13 | 3029 | 2911 | 104.1 | 56.67 | Elimination Finals |
| 4 | Brisbane Bullets | 30 | 16 | 14 | 2876 | 2835 | 101.4 | 53.33 | Elimination Finals |
| 5 | Melbourne Tigers | 30 | 16 | 14 | 3103 | 3048 | 101.8 | 53.33 | Elimination Finals |
| 6 | Wollongong Hawks | 30 | 14 | 16 | 2875 | 2995 | 96.0 | 46.67 | Elimination Finals |
| 7 | Canberra Cannons | 30 | 14 | 16 | 2874 | 2966 | 96.9 | 46.67 | |
| 8 | Sydney Kings | 30 | 13 | 17 | 3089 | 3228 | 95.7 | 43.33 | |
| 9 | Townsville Suns | 30 | 12 | 18 | 3008 | 3077 | 97.8 | 40.00 | |
| 10 | North Melbourne Giants | 30 | 9 | 21 | 2916 | 3089 | 94.4 | 30.00 | |
| 11 | Newcastle Falcons | 30 | 9 | 21 | 2790 | 2948 | 94.6 | 30.00 | |

Updated to match(es) played on 9 June 1998. Source: NBL.com.au

Elimination Finals
4 | Brisbane Bullets | 93 | 114 | X
5 | Melbourne Tigers | 80 | 81 | X
3 | Perth Wildcats | 95 | 120 | X
6 | Wollongong Hawks | 85 | 97 | X

Semifinals
1 | S.E. Melbourne Magic | 106 | 90 | X
4 | Brisbane Bullets | 98 | 84 | X
2 | Adelaide 36ers | 114 | 117 | X
3 | Perth Wildcats | 97 | 110 | X

Grand Final
1 | S.E. Melbourne Magic | 93 | 62 | X
2 | Adelaide 36ers | 100 | 90 | X

=== 1997 ===
| Pos | Team | Pld | W | L | GF | GA | PP | PCT | Qualification |
|---|---|---|---|---|---|---|---|---|---|
| 1 | South East Melbourne Magic | 30 | 22 | 8 | 2850 | 2662 | 107.1 | 73.33 | Semifinals |
| 2 | Melbourne Tigers | 30 | 19 | 11 | 3092 | 3028 | 102.1 | 63.33 | Semifinals |
| 3 | North Melbourne Giants | 30 | 18 | 12 | 2943 | 2881 | 102.2 | 60.00 | Elimination Finals |
| 4 | Perth Wildcats | 30 | 17 | 13 | 2933 | 2825 | 103.8 | 56.67 | Elimination Finals |
| 5 | Brisbane Bullets | 30 | 15 | 15 | 2731 | 2786 | 98.0 | 50.00 | Elimination Finals |
| 6 | Canberra Cannons | 30 | 15 | 15 | 2789 | 2773 | 100.6 | 50.00 | Elimination Finals |
| 7 | Adelaide 36ers | 30 | 14 | 16 | 2973 | 2922 | 101.7 | 46.67 | |
| 8 | Townsville Suns | 30 | 14 | 16 | 3084 | 3015 | 102.3 | 46.67 | |
| 9 | Newcastle Falcons | 30 | 12 | 18 | 2995 | 3173 | 94.4 | 40.00 | |
| 10 | Sydney Kings | 30 | 12 | 18 | 2938 | 2991 | 98.2 | 40.00 | |
| 11 | Illawarra Hawks | 30 | 7 | 23 | 2906 | 3178 | 91.4 | 23.33 | |

Updated to match(es) played on 29 September 1997. Source: NBL.com.au

Elimination Finals
4 | Perth Wildcats | 81 | 88 | X
5 | Brisbane Bullets | 79 | 71 | X
3 | North Melbourne Giants | 93 | 108 | 102
6 | Canberra Cannons | 104 | 98 | 75

Semifinals
1 | S.E. Melbourne Magic | 92 | 96 | X
4 | Perth Wildcats | 82 | 69 | X
2 | Melbourne Tigers | 107 | 112 | X
3 | North Melbourne Giants | 99 | 105 | X

Grand Final
1 | S.E. Melbourne Magic | 74 | 84 | 83
2 | Melbourne Tigers | 111 | 78 | 93

=== 1996 ===
| Pos | Team | Pld | W | L | GF | GA | PP | PCT | Qualification |
|---|---|---|---|---|---|---|---|---|---|
| 1 | Melbourne Tigers | 26 | 21 | 5 | 2834 | 2647 | 107.1 | 80.77 | Quarterfinals |
| 2 | South East Melbourne Magic | 26 | 19 | 7 | 2623 | 2338 | 112.2 | 73.08 | Quarterfinals |
| 3 | Perth Wildcats | 26 | 16 | 10 | 2565 | 2472 | 103.8 | 61.54 | Quarterfinals |
| 4 | Canberra Cannons | 26 | 16 | 10 | 2606 | 2415 | 107.9 | 61.54 | Quarterfinals |
| 5 | Sydney Kings | 26 | 16 | 10 | 2830 | 2775 | 102.0 | 61.54 | Quarterfinals |
| 6 | Adelaide 36ers | 26 | 16 | 10 | 2623 | 2530 | 103.7 | 61.54 | Quarterfinals |
| 7 | North Melbourne Giants | 26 | 15 | 11 | 2647 | 2580 | 102.6 | 57.69 | Quarterfinals |
| 8 | Brisbane Bullets | 26 | 14 | 12 | 2527 | 2369 | 106.7 | 53.85 | Quarterfinals |
| 9 | Newcastle Falcons | 26 | 11 | 15 | 2546 | 2633 | 96.7 | 42.31 | |
| 10 | Illawarra Hawks | 26 | 9 | 17 | 2647 | 2704 | 97.9 | 34.62 | |
| 11 | Townsville Suns | 26 | 9 | 17 | 2554 | 2797 | 91.3 | 34.62 | |
| 12 | Hobart Devils | 26 | 8 | 18 | 2356 | 2541 | 92.7 | 30.77 | |
| 13 | Geelong Supercats | 26 | 6 | 20 | 2536 | 2783 | 91.1 | 23.08 | |
| 14 | Gold Coast Rollers | 26 | 6 | 20 | 2538 | 2848 | 89.1 | 23.08 | |

Updated to match(es) played on 28 September 1996. Source: NBL.com.au

Quarterfinals
1 | Melbourne Tigers | 97 | 96 | 111
8 | Brisbane Bullets | 118 | 87 | 93
4 | Canberra Cannons | 89 | 146 | 101
5 | Sydney Kings | 113 | 99 | 89
3 | Perth Wildcats | 93 | 115 | 104
6 | Adelaide 36ers | 103 | 92 | 114
2 | S.E. Melbourne Magic | 96 | 87 | X
7 | North Melbourne Giants | 82 | 77 | X

Semifinals
1 | Melbourne Tigers | 87 | 100 | 91
4 | Canberra Cannons | 98 | 82 | 87
2 | S.E. Melbourne Magic | 87 | 112 | X
6 | Adelaide 36ers | 86 | 81 | X

Grand Final
1 | Melbourne Tigers | 100 | 84 | 70
2 | S.E. Melbourne Magic | 89 | 88 | 107

=== 1995 ===
| Pos | Team | Pld | W | L | GF | GA | PP | PCT | Qualification |
|---|---|---|---|---|---|---|---|---|---|
| 1 | Perth Wildcats | 26 | 19 | 7 | 2721 | 2617 | 104.0 | 73.08 | Quarterfinals |
| 2 | South East Melbourne Magic | 26 | 18 | 8 | 2742 | 2547 | 107.7 | 69.23 | Quarterfinals |
| 3 | North Melbourne Giants | 26 | 18 | 8 | 2886 | 2694 | 107.1 | 69.23 | Quarterfinals |
| 4 | Adelaide 36ers | 26 | 17 | 9 | 2651 | 2590 | 102.4 | 65.38 | Quarterfinals |
| 5 | Newcastle Falcons | 26 | 17 | 9 | 2616 | 2611 | 100.2 | 65.38 | Quarterfinals |
| 6 | Brisbane Bullets | 26 | 16 | 10 | 2818 | 2719 | 103.6 | 61.54 | Quarterfinals |
| 7 | Illawarra Hawks | 26 | 14 | 12 | 2635 | 2584 | 102.0 | 53.85 | Quarterfinals |
| 8 | Melbourne Tigers | 26 | 14 | 12 | 2891 | 2762 | 104.7 | 53.85 | Quarterfinals |
| 9 | Canberra Cannons | 26 | 12 | 14 | 2768 | 2778 | 99.6 | 46.15 | |
| 10 | Sydney Kings | 26 | 10 | 16 | 2578 | 2692 | 95.8 | 38.46 | |
| 11 | Geelong Supercats | 26 | 9 | 17 | 2672 | 2836 | 94.2 | 34.62 | |
| 12 | Townsville Suns | 26 | 9 | 17 | 2677 | 2730 | 98.1 | 34.62 | |
| 13 | Gold Coast Rollers | 26 | 5 | 21 | 2700 | 2921 | 92.4 | 19.23 | |
| 14 | Hobart Tassie Devils | 26 | 4 | 22 | 2386 | 2660 | 89.7 | 15.38 | |

Updated to match(es) played on 16 September 1995. Source: NBL.com.au

Quarterfinals
1 | Perth Wildcats | 91 | 108 | 96
8 | Melbourne Tigers | 103 | 99 | 92
4 | Adelaide 36ers | 93 | 94 | 99
5 | Newcastle Falcons | 101 | 84 | 92
3 | North Melbourne Giants | 115 | 130 | X
6 | Brisbane Bullets | 105 | 99 | X
2 | S.E. Melbourne Magic | 108 | 92 | 93
7 | Illawarra Hawks | 113 | 89 | 75

Semifinals
1 | Perth Wildcats | 94 | 85 | X
4 | Adelaide 36ers | 78 | 76 | X
2 | S.E. Melbourne Magic | 77 | 98 | 92
3 | North Melbourne Giants | 98 | 79 | 107

Grand Final
1 | Perth Wildcats | 97 | 97 | 108
3 | North Melbourne Giants | 104 | 88 | 88

=== 1994 ===
| Pos | Team | Pld | W | L | GF | GA | PP | PCT | Qualification |
|---|---|---|---|---|---|---|---|---|---|
| 1 | Melbourne Tigers | 26 | 19 | 7 | 2925 | 2811 | 104.1 | 73.08 | Quarterfinals |
| 2 | North Melbourne Giants | 26 | 19 | 7 | 2814 | 2530 | 111.2 | 73.08 | Quarterfinals |
| 3 | South East Melbourne Magic | 26 | 18 | 8 | 2897 | 2591 | 111.8 | 69.23 | Quarterfinals |
| 4 | Adelaide 36ers | 26 | 18 | 8 | 2696 | 2412 | 111.8 | 69.23 | Quarterfinals |
| 5 | Brisbane Bullets | 26 | 18 | 8 | 3001 | 2837 | 105.8 | 69.23 | Quarterfinals |
| 6 | Perth Wildcats | 26 | 16 | 10 | 2654 | 2561 | 103.6 | 61.54 | Quarterfinals |
| 7 | Sydney Kings | 26 | 16 | 10 | 2652 | 2564 | 103.4 | 61.54 | Quarterfinals |
| 8 | Illawarra Hawks | 26 | 13 | 13 | 2473 | 2571 | 96.2 | 50.00 | Quarterfinals |
| 9 | Newcastle Falcons | 26 | 13 | 13 | 2643 | 2634 | 100.3 | 50.00 | |
| 10 | Gold Coast Rollers | 26 | 10 | 16 | 2467 | 2501 | 98.6 | 38.46 | |
| 11 | Canberra Cannons | 26 | 7 | 19 | 2507 | 2777 | 90.3 | 26.92 | |
| 12 | Geelong Supercats | 26 | 7 | 19 | 2752 | 2895 | 95.1 | 26.92 | |
| 13 | Townsville Suns | 26 | 6 | 20 | 2505 | 2949 | 84.9 | 23.08 | |
| 14 | Hobart Tassie Devils | 26 | 2 | 24 | 2470 | 2823 | 87.5 | 7.69 | |

Updated to match(es) played on 24 September 1994. Source: NBL.com.au

Quarterfinals
1 | Melbourne Tigers | 107 | 119 | X
8 | Illawarra Hawks | 85 | 83 | X
4 | Adelaide 36ers | 105 | 99 | 101
5 | Brisbane Bullets | 116 | 91 | 84
3 | S.E. Melbourne Magic | 113 | 100 | X
6 | Perth Wildcats | 82 | 86 | X
2 | North Melbourne Giants | 109 | 112 | 104
7 | Sydney Kings | 131 | 91 | 95

Semifinals
1 | Melbourne Tigers | 88 | 101 | X
4 | Adelaide 36ers | 101 | 110 | X
2 | North Melbourne Giants | 108 | 79 | X
3 | S.E. Melbourne Magic | 87 | 76 | X

Grand Final
2 | North Melbourne Giants | 95 | 117 | X
4 | Adelaide 36ers | 93 | 97 | X

=== 1993 ===
| Pos | Team | Pld | W | L | GF | GA | PP | PCT | Qualification |
|---|---|---|---|---|---|---|---|---|---|
| 1 | Perth Wildcats | 26 | 21 | 5 | 2709 | 2499 | 108.4 | 80.77 | Quarterfinals |
| 2 | South East Melbourne Magic | 26 | 20 | 6 | 2687 | 2365 | 113.6 | 76.92 | Quarterfinals |
| 3 | Melbourne Tigers | 26 | 16 | 10 | 2782 | 2668 | 104.3 | 61.54 | Quarterfinals |
| 4 | Brisbane Bullets | 26 | 16 | 10 | 2684 | 2571 | 104.4 | 61.54 | Quarterfinals |
| 5 | Newcastle Falcons | 26 | 15 | 11 | 2502 | 2508 | 99.8 | 57.69 | Quarterfinals |
| 6 | Illawarra Hawks | 26 | 15 | 11 | 2452 | 2462 | 99.6 | 57.69 | Quarterfinals |
| 7 | Adelaide 36ers | 26 | 14 | 12 | 2516 | 2449 | 102.7 | 53.85 | Quarterfinals |
| 8 | North Melbourne Giants | 26 | 13 | 13 | 2653 | 2527 | 105.0 | 50.00 | Quarterfinals |
| 9 | Canberra Cannons | 26 | 12 | 14 | 2604 | 2608 | 99.8 | 46.15 | |
| 10 | Gold Coast Rollers | 26 | 12 | 14 | 2525 | 2559 | 98.7 | 46.15 | |
| 11 | Sydney Kings | 26 | 11 | 15 | 2523 | 2656 | 95.0 | 42.31 | |
| 12 | Geelong Supercats | 26 | 7 | 19 | 2692 | 2918 | 92.3 | 26.92 | |
| 13 | Hobart Tassie Devils | 26 | 6 | 20 | 2507 | 2736 | 91.6 | 23.08 | |
| 14 | Townsville Suns | 26 | 4 | 22 | 2623 | 2933 | 89.4 | 15.38 | |

Updated to match(es) played on 25 September 1993. Source: NBL.com.au

Quarterfinals
1 | Perth Wildcats | 101 | 108 | 117
8 | North Melbourne Giants | 105 | 98 | 104
4 | Brisbane Bullets | 125 | 122 | X
5 | Newcastle Falcons | 99 | 118 | X
3 | Melbourne Tigers | 107 | 108 | X
6 | Illawarra Hawks | 95 | 98 | X
2 | S.E. Melbourne Magic | 99 | 102 | X
7 | Adelaide 36ers | 93 | 87 | X

Semifinals
1 | Perth Wildcats | 97 | 120 | 119
4 | Brisbane Bullets | 101 | 107 | 80
2 | S.E. Melbourne Magic | 106 | 72 | X
3 | Melbourne Tigers | 108 | 89 | X

Grand Final
1 | Perth Wildcats | 113 | 112 | 102
3 | Melbourne Tigers | 117 | 105 | 104

=== 1992 ===
| Pos | Team | Pld | W | L | GF | GA | PP | PCT | Qualification |
|---|---|---|---|---|---|---|---|---|---|
| 1 | South East Melbourne Magic | 24 | 20 | 4 | 2511 | 2289 | 109.7 | 83.33 | Quarterfinals |
| 2 | Sydney Kings | 24 | 17 | 7 | 2540 | 2434 | 104.4 | 70.83 | Quarterfinals |
| 3 | Melbourne Tigers | 24 | 15 | 9 | 2745 | 2638 | 104.1 | 62.50 | Quarterfinals |
| 4 | North Melbourne Giants | 24 | 14 | 10 | 2709 | 2621 | 103.4 | 58.33 | Quarterfinals |
| 5 | Illawarra Hawks | 24 | 13 | 11 | 2451 | 2423 | 101.2 | 54.17 | Quarterfinals |
| 6 | Perth Wildcats | 24 | 12 | 12 | 2468 | 2429 | 101.6 | 50.00 | Quarterfinals |
| 7 | Brisbane Bullets | 24 | 12 | 12 | 2645 | 2722 | 97.2 | 50.00 | Quarterfinals |
| 8 | Canberra Cannons | 24 | 11 | 13 | 2525 | 2474 | 102.1 | 45.83 | Quarterfinals |
| 9 | Adelaide 36ers | 24 | 11 | 13 | 2468 | 2388 | 103.4 | 45.83 | |
| 10 | Gold Coast Rollers | 24 | 11 | 13 | 2353 | 2444 | 96.3 | 45.83 | |
| 11 | Hobart Tassie Devils | 24 | 9 | 15 | 2463 | 2535 | 97.2 | 37.50 | |
| 12 | Newcastle Falcons | 24 | 9 | 15 | 2652 | 2759 | 96.1 | 37.50 | |
| 13 | Geelong Supercats | 24 | 2 | 22 | 2525 | 2899 | 87.1 | 8.33 | |

Updated to match(es) played on 26 September 1992. Source: NBL.com.au

Quarterfinals
1 | S.E. Melbourne Magic | 91 | 101 | X
8 | Canberra Cannons | 89 | 96 | X
4 | North Melbourne Giants | 118 | 123 | X
5 | Illawarra Hawks | 98 | 104 | X
3 | Melbourne Tigers | 103 | 95 | 116
6 | Perth Wildcats | 111 | 94 | 100
2 | Sydney Kings | 100 | 130 | X
7 | Brisbane Bullets | 91 | 123 | X

Semifinals
1 | S.E. Melbourne Magic | 112 | 127 | X
4 | North Melbourne Giants | 86 | 106 | X
2 | Sydney Kings | 112 | 124 | 95
3 | Melbourne Tigers | 122 | 118 | 101

Grand Final
1 | S.E. Melbourne Magic | 98 | 115 | 95
3 | Melbourne Tigers | 116 | 93 | 88

=== 1991 ===
| Pos | Team | Pld | W | L | GF | GA | PP | PCT | Qualification |
|---|---|---|---|---|---|---|---|---|---|
| 1 | Perth Wildcats | 26 | 22 | 4 | 2750 | 2508 | 109.6 | 84.62 | Semifinals |
| 2 | Eastside Spectres | 26 | 17 | 9 | 2932 | 2792 | 105.0 | 65.38 | Semifinals |
| 3 | Geelong Supercats | 26 | 17 | 9 | 3143 | 2980 | 105.5 | 65.38 | Elimination Finals |
| 4 | Adelaide 36ers | 26 | 16 | 10 | 3028 | 2876 | 105.3 | 61.54 | Elimination Finals |
| 5 | Melbourne Tigers | 26 | 16 | 10 | 3104 | 3044 | 102.0 | 61.54 | Elimination Finals |
| 6 | North Melbourne Giants | 26 | 16 | 10 | 3047 | 2840 | 107.3 | 61.54 | Elimination Finals |
| 7 | Sydney Kings | 26 | 14 | 12 | 2821 | 2775 | 101.7 | 53.85 | |
| 8 | Gold Coast Rollers | 26 | 14 | 12 | 2781 | 2805 | 99.1 | 53.85 | |
| 9 | Brisbane Bullets | 26 | 13 | 13 | 2912 | 2968 | 98.1 | 50.00 | |
| 10 | Canberra Cannons | 26 | 9 | 17 | 2741 | 2781 | 98.6 | 34.62 | |
| 11 | Southern Melbourne Saints | 26 | 9 | 17 | 2872 | 3094 | 92.8 | 34.62 | |
| 12 | Hobart Tassie Devils | 26 | 8 | 18 | 2811 | 3047 | 92.3 | 30.77 | |
| 13 | Illawarra Hawks | 26 | 6 | 20 | 3032 | 3196 | 94.9 | 23.08 | |
| 14 | Newcastle Falcons | 26 | 5 | 21 | 2803 | 3071 | 91.3 | 19.23 | |

Updated to match(es) played on 22 September 1991. Source: NBL.com.au

Elimination Finals
4 | Adelaide 36ers | 129 | 132 | X
5 | Melbourne Tigers | 115 | 96 | X
3 | Geelong Supercats | 139 | 116 | 113
6 | North Melbourne Giants | 119 | 136 | 125

Semifinals
1 | Perth Wildcats | 102 | 105 | X
4 | Adelaide 36ers | 99 | 104 | X
2 | Eastside Spectres | 99 | 115 | X
6 | North Melbourne Giants | 93 | 104 | X

Grand Final
1 | Perth Wildcats | 109 | 81 | 90
2 | Eastside Spectres | 83 | 86 | 80

=== 1990 ===
| Pos | Team | Pld | W | L | GF | GA | PP | PCT | Qualification |
|---|---|---|---|---|---|---|---|---|---|
| 1 | North Melbourne Giants | 26 | 20 | 6 | 3111 | 2889 | 107.7 | 76.92 | Semifinals |
| 2 | Eastside Spectres | 26 | 18 | 8 | 3028 | 2858 | 105.9 | 69.23 | Semifinals |
| 3 | Brisbane Bullets | 26 | 18 | 8 | 3053 | 2902 | 105.2 | 69.23 | Elimination Finals |
| 4 | Melbourne Tigers | 26 | 17 | 9 | 3226 | 3018 | 106.9 | 65.38 | Elimination Finals |
| 5 | Perth Wildcats | 26 | 17 | 9 | 2926 | 2791 | 104.8 | 65.38 | Elimination Finals |
| 6 | Sydney Kings | 26 | 16 | 10 | 2819 | 2710 | 104.0 | 61.54 | Elimination Finals |
| 7 | Canberra Cannons | 26 | 16 | 10 | 2918 | 2843 | 102.6 | 61.54 | |
| 8 | Illawarra Hawks | 26 | 13 | 13 | 3056 | 3094 | 98.8 | 50.00 | |
| 9 | Adelaide 36ers | 26 | 12 | 14 | 3042 | 2997 | 101.5 | 46.15 | |
| 10 | Geelong Supercats | 26 | 11 | 15 | 3002 | 2997 | 100.2 | 42.31 | |
| 11 | Gold Coast Cougars | 26 | 9 | 17 | 2880 | 2978 | 96.7 | 34.62 | |
| 12 | Hobart Tassie Devils | 26 | 8 | 18 | 2926 | 3149 | 92.9 | 30.77 | |
| 13 | Newcastle Falcons | 26 | 4 | 22 | 2796 | 3135 | 89.2 | 15.38 | |
| 14 | Westside Saints | 26 | 3 | 23 | 2713 | 3135 | 86.5 | 11.54 | |

Updated to match(es) played on 22 September 1990. Source: NBL.com.au

Elimination Finals
4 | Melbourne Tigers | 100 | 113 | X
5 | Perth Wildcats | 122 | 123 | X
3 | Brisbane Bullets | 87 | 124 | 107
6 | Sydney Kings | 98 | 96 | 104

Semifinals
1 | North Melbourne Giants | 111 | 131 | 110
5 | Perth Wildcats | 121 | 110 | 112
2 | Eastside Spectres | 111 | 119 | X
3 | Brisbane Bullets | 121 | 120 | X

Grand Final
3 | Brisbane Bullets | 106 | 106 | 86
5 | Perth Wildcats | 112 | 90 | 109

=== 1989 ===
| Pos | Team | Pld | W | L | GF | GA | PP | PCT | Qualification |
|---|---|---|---|---|---|---|---|---|---|
| 1 | Canberra Cannons | 24 | 18 | 6 | 2736 | 2580 | 106.0 | 75.00 | Semifinals |
| 2 | North Melbourne Giants | 24 | 17 | 7 | 2993 | 2701 | 110.8 | 70.83 | Semifinals |
| 3 | Perth Wildcats | 24 | 16 | 8 | 2681 | 2660 | 100.8 | 66.67 | Elimination Finals |
| 4 | Melbourne Tigers | 24 | 16 | 8 | 2802 | 2660 | 105.3 | 66.67 | Elimination Finals |
| 5 | Sydney Kings | 24 | 15 | 9 | 2471 | 2489 | 99.3 | 62.50 | Elimination Finals |
| 6 | Adelaide 36ers | 24 | 15 | 9 | 2778 | 2668 | 104.1 | 62.50 | Elimination Finals |
| 7 | Eastside Spectres | 24 | 14 | 10 | 2527 | 2454 | 103.0 | 58.33 | |
| 8 | Brisbane Bullets | 24 | 11 | 13 | 2563 | 2492 | 102.8 | 45.83 | |
| 9 | Westside Saints | 24 | 8 | 16 | 2522 | 2648 | 95.2 | 33.33 | |
| 10 | Hobart Tassie Devils | 24 | 8 | 16 | 2566 | 2757 | 93.1 | 33.33 | |
| 11 | Illawarra Hawks | 24 | 7 | 17 | 2826 | 2929 | 96.5 | 29.17 | |
| 12 | Newcastle Falcons | 24 | 6 | 18 | 2649 | 2799 | 94.6 | 25.00 | |
| 13 | Geelong Supercats | 24 | 5 | 19 | 2445 | 2722 | 89.8 | 20.83 | |

Updated to match(es) played on 16 September 1989. Source: NBL.com.au

Elimination Finals
4 | Melbourne Tigers | 105 | 112 | 83
5 | Sydney Kings | 117 | 89 | 85
3 | Perth Wildcats | 122 | 114 | 112
6 | Adelaide 36ers | 124 | 94 | 108

Semifinals
1 | Canberra Cannons | 108 | 92 | 142
5 | Sydney Kings | 98 | 100 | 82
2 | North Melbourne Giants | 129 | 108 | 165
3 | Perth Wildcats | 108 | 111 | 110

Grand Final
1 | Canberra Cannons | 105 | 97 | X
2 | North Melbourne Giants | 111 | 111 | X

=== 1988 ===
| Pos | Team | Pld | W | L | GF | GA | PP | PCT | Qualification |
|---|---|---|---|---|---|---|---|---|---|
| 1 | Adelaide 36ers | 24 | 19 | 5 | 2744 | 2400 | 114.3 | 79.17 | Semifinals |
| 2 | North Melbourne Giants | 24 | 18 | 6 | 2903 | 2697 | 107.6 | 75.00 | Semifinals |
| 3 | Brisbane Bullets | 24 | 18 | 6 | 2603 | 2423 | 107.4 | 75.00 | Elimination Finals |
| 4 | Canberra Cannons | 24 | 16 | 8 | 2691 | 2515 | 107.0 | 66.67 | Elimination Finals |
| 5 | Newcastle Falcons | 24 | 13 | 11 | 2850 | 2832 | 100.6 | 54.17 | Elimination Finals |
| 6 | Perth Wildcats | 24 | 13 | 11 | 2653 | 2573 | 103.1 | 54.17 | Elimination Finals |
| 7 | Illawarra Hawks | 24 | 11 | 13 | 2455 | 2410 | 101.9 | 45.83 | |
| 8 | Eastside Spectres | 24 | 11 | 13 | 2495 | 2500 | 99.8 | 45.83 | |
| 9 | Hobart Tassie Devils | 24 | 10 | 14 | 2298 | 2414 | 95.2 | 41.67 | |
| 10 | Sydney Kings | 24 | 10 | 14 | 2460 | 2554 | 96.3 | 41.67 | |
| 11 | Westside Saints | 24 | 9 | 15 | 2534 | 2589 | 97.9 | 37.50 | |
| 12 | Melbourne Tigers | 24 | 8 | 16 | 2562 | 2681 | 95.6 | 33.33 | |
| 13 | Geelong Supercats | 24 | 0 | 24 | 2298 | 2958 | 77.7 | 0.00 | |

Updated to match(es) played on 9 July 1988. Source: NBL.com.au

Elimination Finals
4 | Canberra Cannons | 107
5 | Newcastle Falcons | 92
3 | Brisbane Bullets | 98
6 | Perth Wildcats | 113

Semifinals
1 | Adelaide 36ers | 91 | 95 | X
4 | Canberra Cannons | 100 | 100 | X
2 | North Melbourne Giants | 105 | 137 | 134
6 | Perth Wildcats | 108 | 113 | 111

Grand Final
2 | North Melbourne Giants | 95 | 117 | 101
4 | Canberra Cannons | 120 | 101 | 108

=== 1987 ===
| Pos | Team | Pld | W | L | GF | GA | PP | PCT | Qualification |
|---|---|---|---|---|---|---|---|---|---|
| 1 | Adelaide 36ers | 26 | 21 | 5 | 3046 | 2677 | 113.8 | 80.77 | Semifinals |
| 2 | Brisbane Bullets | 26 | 20 | 6 | 2711 | 2497 | 108.6 | 76.92 | Semifinals |
| 3 | Illawarra Hawks | 26 | 20 | 6 | 2680 | 2528 | 106.0 | 76.92 | Elimination Finals |
| 4 | Perth Wildcats | 26 | 19 | 7 | 3005 | 2756 | 109.0 | 73.08 | Elimination Finals |
| 5 | Canberra Cannons | 26 | 17 | 9 | 2848 | 2770 | 102.8 | 65.38 | Elimination Finals |
| 6 | North Melbourne Giants | 26 | 15 | 11 | 3060 | 2807 | 109.0 | 57.69 | Elimination Finals |
| 7 | Hobart Tassie Devils | 26 | 14 | 12 | 2599 | 2568 | 101.2 | 53.85 | |
| 8 | Eastside Spectres | 26 | 13 | 13 | 2607 | 2596 | 100.4 | 50.00 | |
| 9 | Geelong Cats | 26 | 13 | 13 | 2644 | 2707 | 97.7 | 50.00 | |
| 10 | Sydney Supersonics | 26 | 9 | 17 | 2744 | 2861 | 95.9 | 34.62 | |
| 11 | West Sydney Westars | 26 | 8 | 18 | 2564 | 2695 | 95.1 | 30.77 | |
| 12 | Newcastle Falcons | 26 | 6 | 20 | 2948 | 3176 | 92.8 | 23.08 | |
| 13 | Westside Saints | 26 | 4 | 22 | 2673 | 2980 | 89.7 | 15.38 | |
| 14 | Melbourne Tigers | 26 | 3 | 23 | 2635 | 3146 | 83.8 | 11.54 | |

Updated to match(es) played on 20 September 1987. Source: NBL.com.au

Elimination Finals
4 | Perth Wildcats | 101
5 | Canberra Cannons | 96
3 | Illawarra Hawks | 105
6 | North Melbourne Giants | 97

Semifinals
1 | Adelaide 36ers | 99 | 99 | 93
4 | Perth Wildcats | 98 | 101 | 103
2 | Brisbane Bullets | 109 | 77 | 100
3 | Illawarra Hawks | 87 | 78 | 82

Grand Final
2 | Brisbane Bullets | 80 | 106 | X
4 | Perth Wildcats | 79 | 87 | X

=== 1986 ===
| Pos | Team | Pld | W | L | GF | GA | PP | PCT | Qualification |
|---|---|---|---|---|---|---|---|---|---|
| 1 | Adelaide 36ers | 26 | 24 | 2 | 3016 | 2510 | 120.2 | 92.31 | Semifinals |
| 2 | Canberra Cannons | 26 | 19 | 7 | 2718 | 2520 | 107.9 | 73.08 | Semifinals |
| 3 | Brisbane Bullets | 26 | 17 | 9 | 2650 | 2485 | 106.6 | 65.38 | Elimination Finals |
| 4 | West Sydney Westars | 26 | 15 | 11 | 2519 | 2492 | 101.1 | 57.69 | Elimination Finals |
| 5 | Illawarra Hawks | 26 | 15 | 11 | 2551 | 2472 | 103.2 | 57.69 | Elimination Finals |
| 6 | Sydney Supersonics | 26 | 14 | 12 | 2518 | 2438 | 103.3 | 53.85 | Elimination Finals |
| 7 | Geelong Cats | 26 | 14 | 12 | 2875 | 2889 | 99.5 | 53.85 | |
| 8 | Coburg Giants | 26 | 14 | 12 | 2841 | 2825 | 100.6 | 53.85 | |
| 9 | Nunawading Spectres | 26 | 12 | 14 | 2592 | 2642 | 98.1 | 46.15 | |
| 10 | Newcastle Falcons | 26 | 10 | 16 | 2782 | 2878 | 96.7 | 38.46 | |
| 11 | Hobart Devils | 26 | 9 | 17 | 2606 | 2704 | 96.4 | 34.62 | |
| 12 | Perth Wildcats | 26 | 8 | 18 | 2458 | 2693 | 91.3 | 30.77 | |
| 13 | Melbourne Tigers | 26 | 6 | 20 | 2822 | 3089 | 91.4 | 23.08 | |
| 14 | St. Kilda Saints | 26 | 5 | 21 | 2742 | 3053 | 89.8 | 19.23 | |

Updated to match(es) played on 28 September 1986. Source: NBL.com.au

Elimination Finals
4 | West Sydney Westars | 86
5 | Illawarra Hawks | 105
3 | Brisbane Bullets | 100
6 | Sydney SuperSonics | 82

Semifinals
1 | Adelaide 36ers | 116
5 | Illawarra Hawks | 92
2 | Canberra Cannons | 100
3 | Brisbane Bullets | 120

Grand Final
1 | Adelaide 36ers | 122 | 83 | 113
3 | Brisbane Bullets | 119 | 104 | 91

=== 1985 ===
| Pos | Team | Pld | W | L | GF | GA | PP | PCT | Qualification |
|---|---|---|---|---|---|---|---|---|---|
| 1 | Brisbane Bullets | 26 | 20 | 6 | 2832 | 2328 | 121.6 | 76.92 | Semifinals |
| 2 | Adelaide 36ers | 26 | 20 | 6 | 3155 | 2693 | 117.2 | 76.92 | Semifinals |
| 3 | Nunawading Spectres | 26 | 19 | 7 | 2574 | 2388 | 107.8 | 73.08 | Elimination Finals |
| 4 | Canberra Cannons | 26 | 19 | 7 | 2607 | 2439 | 106.9 | 73.08 | Elimination Finals |
| 5 | Coburg Giants | 26 | 18 | 8 | 2947 | 2730 | 107.9 | 69.23 | Elimination Finals |
| 6 | Newcastle Falcons | 26 | 16 | 10 | 2864 | 2796 | 102.4 | 61.54 | Elimination Finals |
| 7 | Geelong Cats | 26 | 15 | 11 | 2871 | 2674 | 107.4 | 57.69 | |
| 8 | Perth Wildcats | 26 | 13 | 13 | 2816 | 2844 | 99.0 | 50.00 | |
| 9 | Illawarra Hawks | 26 | 10 | 16 | 2690 | 2975 | 90.4 | 38.46 | |
| 10 | St. Kilda Saints | 26 | 10 | 16 | 2699 | 2810 | 96.0 | 38.46 | |
| 11 | Sydney Supersonics | 26 | 9 | 17 | 2804 | 2934 | 95.6 | 34.62 | |
| 12 | Bankstown Bruins | 26 | 6 | 20 | 2527 | 2694 | 93.8 | 23.08 | |
| 13 | Melbourne Tigers | 26 | 5 | 21 | 2362 | 2903 | 81.4 | 19.23 | |
| 14 | Hobart Devils | 26 | 2 | 24 | 2519 | 3059 | 82.3 | 7.69 | |

Updated to match(es) played on 18 August 1985. Source: NBL.com.au

Elimination Finals
4 | Canberra Cannons | 110
5 | Coburg Giants | 87
3 | Nunawading Spectres | 97
6 | Newcastle Falcons | 103

Semifinals
1 | Brisbane Bullets | 93
4 | Canberra Cannons | 76
2 | Adelaide 36ers | 151
6 | Newcastle Falcons | 103

Grand Final
1 | Brisbane Bullets | 121
2 | Adelaide 36ers | 95

=== 1984 ===
| Pos | Team | Pld | W | L | GF | GA | PP | PCT | Qualification |
|---|---|---|---|---|---|---|---|---|---|
| 1 | Geelong Cats | 23 | 21 | 2 | 2735 | 2236 | 122.3 | 91.30 | Preliminary Finals |
| 2 | Brisbane Bullets | 24 | 19 | 5 | 2546 | 2117 | 120.3 | 79.17 | Preliminary Finals |
| 3 | Coburg Giants | 24 | 18 | 6 | 3032 | 2579 | 117.6 | 75.00 | Preliminary Finals |
| 4 | Newcastle Falcons | 24 | 18 | 6 | 2674 | 2486 | 107.6 | 75.00 | Elimination Finals |
| 5 | Canberra Cannons | 23 | 16 | 7 | 2514 | 2303 | 109.2 | 69.57 | Preliminary Finals |
| 6 | Adelaide 36ers | 23 | 16 | 7 | 2762 | 2590 | 106.6 | 69.57 | Elimination Finals |
| 7 | Nunawading Spectres | 23 | 14 | 9 | 2410 | 2279 | 105.7 | 60.87 | Elimination Finals |
| 8 | Illawarra Hawks | 24 | 13 | 11 | 2539 | 2488 | 102.0 | 54.17 | Elimination Finals |
| 9 | Melbourne Tigers | 24 | 11 | 13 | 2669 | 2584 | 103.3 | 45.83 | |
| 10 | West Adelaide Bearcats | 24 | 11 | 13 | 2580 | 2660 | 97.0 | 45.83 | |
| 11 | Bankstown Bruins | 24 | 10 | 14 | 2303 | 2380 | 96.8 | 41.67 | |
| 12 | Frankston Bears | 24 | 10 | 14 | 2475 | 2576 | 96.1 | 41.67 | |
| 13 | St. Kilda Saints | 23 | 9 | 14 | 2315 | 2446 | 94.6 | 39.13 | |
| 14 | Hobart Devils | 23 | 4 | 19 | 2340 | 2689 | 87.0 | 17.39 | |
| 15 | Devonport Warriors | 23 | 4 | 19 | 2257 | 2623 | 86.0 | 17.39 | |
| 16 | Perth Wildcats | 23 | 3 | 20 | 2176 | 2573 | 84.6 | 13.04 | |
| 17 | Sydney Supersonics | 24 | 3 | 21 | 2170 | 2888 | 75.1 | 12.50 | |

Updated to match(es) played on 17 June 1984. Source: NBL.com.au

Preliminary / Elimination Finals
E1 | Brisbane Bullets | 105
E2 | Coburg Giants | 104
E3 | Newcastle Falcons | 108
E4 | Illawarra Hawks | 104
W3 | Adelaide 36ers | 101
W4 | Nunawading Spectres | 108
W1 | Geelong Cats | 81
W2 | Canberra Cannons | 87

Qualifying Finals
E2 | Coburg Giants | 132
E3 | Newcastle Falcons | 109
W1 | Geelong Cats | 115
W4 | Nunawading Spectres | 91

Semifinals
E1 | Brisbane Bullets | 107
W1 | Geelong Cats | 103
W2 | Canberra Cannons | 108
E2 | Coburg Giants | 107

Grand Final
E1 | Brisbane Bullets | 82
W2 | Canberra Cannons | 84

=== 1983 ===
| Pos | Team | Pld | W | L | GF | GA | PP | PCT | Qualification |
|---|---|---|---|---|---|---|---|---|---|
| 1 | Sydney Supersonics | 22 | 19 | 3 | 1956 | 1710 | 114.4 | 86.36 | Divisional Finals |
| 2 | Geelong Cats | 22 | 18 | 4 | 1953 | 1736 | 112.5 | 81.82 | Divisional Finals |
| 3 | West Adelaide Bearcats | 22 | 17 | 5 | 2180 | 1972 | 110.5 | 77.27 | Divisional Finals |
| 4 | Canberra Cannons | 22 | 16 | 6 | 2049 | 1777 | 115.3 | 72.73 | Divisional Finals |
| 5 | Nunawading Spectres | 22 | 15 | 7 | 1964 | 1760 | 111.6 | 68.18 | Divisional Finals |
| 6 | Coburg Giants | 22 | 13 | 9 | 1976 | 1920 | 102.9 | 59.09 | Divisional Finals |
| 7 | Newcastle Falcons | 22 | 13 | 9 | 2143 | 2076 | 103.2 | 59.09 | Divisional Finals |
| 8 | St. Kilda Saints | 22 | 12 | 10 | 1971 | 1942 | 101.5 | 54.55 | Divisional Finals |
| 9 | Bankstown Bruins | 22 | 12 | 10 | 1737 | 1728 | 100.5 | 54.55 | |
| 10 | Adelaide 36ers | 22 | 11 | 11 | 2002 | 2047 | 97.8 | 50.00 | |
| 11 | Brisbane Bullets | 22 | 10 | 12 | 1734 | 1763 | 98.4 | 45.45 | |
| 12 | Frankston Bears | 22 | 6 | 16 | 1809 | 1863 | 97.1 | 27.27 | |
| 13 | Westate Wildcats | 22 | 6 | 16 | 1929 | 2171 | 88.9 | 27.27 | |
| 14 | Illawarra Hawks | 22 | 4 | 18 | 1929 | 2128 | 90.6 | 18.18 | |
| 15 | Hobart Devils | 22 | 2 | 20 | 1757 | 2102 | 83.6 | 9.09 | |
| 16 | Devonport Warriors | 22 | 2 | 20 | 1674 | 2068 | 80.9 | 9.09 | |

Updated to match(es) played on 18 June 1983. Source: NBL.com.au

Semifinals
1 | Canberra Cannons | 80
4 | Coburg Giants | 75
2 | Nunawading Spectres | 77
3 | West Adelaide Bearcats | 84

Grand Final
1 | Canberra Cannons | 75
2 | West Adelaide Bearcats | 73

=== 1982 ===
| Pos | Team | Pld | W | L | GF | GA | PP | PCT | Qualification |
|---|---|---|---|---|---|---|---|---|---|
| 1 | West Adelaide Bearcats | 26 | 21 | 5 | 2525 | 2177 | 116.0 | 80.77 | Semifinals |
| 2 | Geelong Cats | 26 | 20 | 6 | 2310 | 2183 | 105.8 | 76.92 | Semifinals |
| 3 | Nunawading Spectres | 26 | 19 | 7 | 2209 | 1993 | 110.8 | 73.08 | Semifinals |
| 4 | Coburg Giants | 26 | 18 | 8 | 2260 | 2067 | 109.3 | 69.23 | Semifinals |
| 5 | Newcastle Falcons | 26 | 17 | 9 | 2395 | 2258 | 106.1 | 65.38 | |
| 6 | St. Kilda Saints | 26 | 17 | 9 | 2185 | 2090 | 104.5 | 65.38 | |
| 7 | Adelaide City Eagles | 26 | 15 | 11 | 2457 | 2356 | 104.3 | 57.69 | |
| 8 | Brisbane Bullets | 26 | 12 | 14 | 2059 | 2119 | 97.2 | 46.15 | |
| 9 | Illawarra Hawks | 26 | 11 | 15 | 2382 | 2444 | 97.5 | 42.31 | |
| 10 | Westate Wildcats | 26 | 10 | 16 | 2260 | 2431 | 93.0 | 38.46 | |
| 11 | Canberra Cannons | 26 | 8 | 18 | 2132 | 2221 | 96.0 | 30.77 | |
| 12 | Sydney Supersonics | 26 | 7 | 19 | 2022 | 2232 | 90.6 | 26.92 | |
| 13 | Launceston Casino City | 26 | 5 | 21 | 2231 | 2483 | 89.9 | 19.23 | |
| 14 | Bankstown Bruins | 26 | 2 | 24 | 1948 | 2321 | 83.9 | 7.69 | |

Updated to match(es) played on 11 July 1982. Source: NBL.com.au

Semifinals
1 | West Adelaide Bearcats | 94
4 | Coburg Giants | 74
2 | Geelong Cats | 71
3 | Nunawading Spectres | 59

Grand Final
1 | West Adelaide Bearcats | 80
2 | Geelong Cats | 74

=== 1981 ===
| Pos | Team | Pld | W | L | GF | GA | PP | PCT | Qualification |
|---|---|---|---|---|---|---|---|---|---|
| 1 | St. Kilda Saints | 22 | 17 | 5 | 2134 | 1927 | 110.7 | 77.27 | FIBA Club World Cup |
| 2 | Launceston Casino City | 22 | 14 | 8 | 1895 | 1810 | 104.7 | 63.64 | Semifinals |
| 3 | West Adelaide Bearcats | 22 | 13 | 9 | 1848 | 1823 | 101.4 | 59.09 | Semifinals |
| 4 | Nunawading Spectres | 22 | 13 | 9 | 1706 | 1566 | 108.9 | 59.09 | Semifinals |
| 5 | Brisbane Bullets | 22 | 13 | 9 | 1712 | 1592 | 107.5 | 59.09 | Semifinals |
| 6 | Newcastle Falcons | 22 | 13 | 9 | 1779 | 1714 | 103.8 | 59.09 | |
| 7 | Canberra Cannons | 22 | 12 | 10 | 1700 | 1719 | 98.9 | 54.55 | |
| 8 | Illawarra Hawks | 22 | 9 | 13 | 1889 | 1949 | 96.9 | 40.91 | |
| 9 | City of Sydney Astronauts | 22 | 8 | 14 | 1711 | 1898 | 90.1 | 36.36 | |
| 10 | Coburg Giants | 22 | 7 | 15 | 1690 | 1746 | 96.8 | 31.82 | |
| 11 | Bankstown Bruins | 22 | 7 | 15 | 1746 | 1897 | 92.0 | 31.82 | |
| 12 | Forestville Eagles | 22 | 6 | 16 | 1719 | 1888 | 91.0 | 27.27 | |

Updated to match(es) played on 21 June 1981. Source: NBL.com.au

Semifinals
1 | Launceston Casino City | 71
4 | Brisbane Bullets | 69
2 | West Adelaide Bearcats | 71
3 | Nunawading Spectres | 74

Grand Final
1 | Launceston Casino City | 75
2 | Nunawading Spectres | 54

=== 1980 ===
| Pos | Team | Pld | W | L | GF | GA | PP | PCT | Qualification |
|---|---|---|---|---|---|---|---|---|---|
| 1 | St. Kilda Saints | 22 | 17 | 5 | 2109 | 1886 | 111.8 | 77.27 | Semifinals |
| 2 | West Adelaide Bearcats | 22 | 17 | 5 | 1941 | 1773 | 109.5 | 77.27 | Semifinals |
| 3 | Brisbane Bullets | 22 | 15 | 7 | 1928 | 1780 | 108.3 | 68.18 | Semifinals |
| 4 | Nunawading Spectres | 22 | 14 | 8 | 1660 | 1580 | 105.1 | 63.64 | Semifinals |
| 5 | Illawarra Hawks | 22 | 13 | 9 | 1798 | 1790 | 100.4 | 59.09 | |
| 6 | Newcastle Falcons | 22 | 13 | 9 | 1828 | 1794 | 101.9 | 59.09 | |
| 7 | Canberra Cannons | 22 | 11 | 11 | 1661 | 1631 | 101.8 | 50.00 | |
| 8 | Launceston Casino City | 22 | 9 | 13 | 1863 | 1889 | 98.6 | 40.91 | |
| 9 | Coburg Giants | 22 | 7 | 15 | 1727 | 1740 | 99.3 | 31.82 | |
| 10 | City of Sydney Astronauts | 22 | 7 | 15 | 1717 | 1908 | 90.0 | 31.82 | |
| 11 | West Torrens Eagles | 22 | 6 | 16 | 1707 | 1940 | 88.0 | 27.27 | |
| 12 | Bankstown Bruins | 22 | 3 | 19 | 1721 | 1949 | 88.3 | 13.64 | |

Updated to match(es) played on 8 June 1980. Source: NBL.com.au

Semifinals
1 | St. Kilda Saints | 101
4 | Nunawading Spectres | 77
2 | West Adelaide Bearcats | 101
3 | Brisbane Bullets | 94

Grand Final
1 | St. Kilda Saints | 113
2 | West Adelaide Bearcats | 88

=== 1979 ===
| Pos | Team | Pld | W | L | GF | GA | PP | PCT | Qualification |
|---|---|---|---|---|---|---|---|---|---|
| 1 | St. Kilda Saints | 18 | 15 | 3 | 1689 | 1431 | 118.0 | 83.33 | Grand Final |
| 2 | Canberra Cannons | 18 | 13 | 5 | 1448 | 1398 | 103.6 | 72.22 | Grand Final |
| 3 | Nunawading Spectres | 18 | 13 | 5 | 1439 | 1349 | 106.7 | 72.22 | |
| 4 | West Adelaide Bearcats | 18 | 12 | 6 | 1523 | 1397 | 109.0 | 66.67 | |
| 5 | Brisbane Bullets | 18 | 10 | 8 | 1628 | 1625 | 100.2 | 55.56 | |
| 6 | Newcastle Falcons | 18 | 8 | 10 | 1550 | 1582 | 98.0 | 44.44 | |
| 7 | City of Sydney Astronauts | 18 | 8 | 10 | 1528 | 1609 | 95.0 | 44.44 | |
| 8 | Illawarra Hawks | 18 | 5 | 13 | 1442 | 1521 | 94.8 | 27.78 | |
| 9 | Glenelg Tigers | 18 | 3 | 15 | 1340 | 1524 | 87.9 | 16.67 | |
| 10 | Bankstown Bruins | 18 | 3 | 15 | 1484 | 1635 | 90.8 | 16.67 | |

Updated to match(es) played on 3 June 1979. Source: NBL.com.au

Grand Final

- 10 July: St. Kilda 94, Canberra 93

== See also ==
- NBL Finals
- List of WNBL seasons
