= 1985 NBL Finals =

- League: National Basketball League
- Sport: Basketball
- Duration: 24 August - 7 September 1985
- Teams: 6
- TV partner(s): ABC; SAS (Adelaide); TV0 (Brisbane)

NBL Finals
- Champions: Brisbane Bullets
- Runners-up: Adelaide 36ers
- Finals MVP: Not awarded

Seasons
- ← 1984 1985 →

The 1985 NBL Finals was the championship series of the 1985 season of Australia's National Basketball League (NBL). The Brisbane Bullets defeated the Adelaide 36ers to win their first NBL championship.

== Format ==
The 1985 National Basketball League Finals was played between 24 August and 7 September between the top six teams of the regular season, consisting of two Elimination Finals, two Semifinals and the Grand Final. All Finals games were sudden death and for the first time the higher placed teams were given home court advantage. The top two teams of the regular season, the Brisbane Bullets and Adelaide 36ers, automatically qualified to host their respective Semifinals.

== Qualification ==
=== Qualified teams ===
Team	Finals appearance	Previous appearance	Previous best performance
Brisbane Bullets	4th	1984	Runner up (1984)
Adelaide 36ers	2nd	1984	6th in 1984
Canberra Cannons	4th	1984	Champions (1983, 1984)
Nunawading Spectres	5th	1984	Runner up (1981)
Coburg Giants	4th	1984	4th (1983, 1984)
Newcastle Falcons	3rd	1984	5th in 1984

=== Ladder ===
Pos	1985 NBL season											
Pos	Team	Pld	W	L	PCT	Last 5	Streak	Home	Away	PF	PA	PP
1	Brisbane Bullets^{1}	26	20	6	76.92%	4–1	W2	12–1	8–5	2832	2328	121.65%
2	Adelaide 36ers^{1}	26	20	6	76.92%	4–1	L1	11–2	9–4	3155	2693	117.16%
3	Nunawading Spectres^{2}	26	19	7	73.08%	4–1	W3	10–3	9–4	2574	2388	107.79%
4	Canberra Cannons^{2}	26	19	7	73.08%	3–2	L2	7–6	12–1	2607	2439	106.89%
5	Coburg Giants	26	18	8	69.23%	4–1	W4	11–2	7–6	2947	2730	107.95%
6	Newcastle Falcons	26	16	10	61.54%	2–3	L1	9–4	7–6	2864	2796	102.43%
7	Geelong Cats	26	15	11	57.69%	2–3	L1	8–5	7–6	2871	2674	107.37%
8	Perth Wildcats	26	13	13	50.00%	3–2	W3	9–4	4–9	2816	2844	99.02%
9	Illawarra Hawks^{3}	26	10	16	38.46%	1–4	L1	6–7	4–9	2690	2975	90.42%
10	St. Kilda Saints^{3}	26	10	16	38.46%	2–3	L1	7–6	3–10	2699	2810	96.05%
11	Sydney Supersonics	26	9	17	34.62%	2–3	L3	6–7	3–10	2804	2934	95.57%
12	Bankstown Bruins	26	6	20	23.08%	3–2	W1	3–10	3–10	2527	2694	93.80%
13	Melbourne Tigers	26	5	21	19.23%	1–4	L2	3–10	2–11	2362	2903	81.36%
14	Hobart Devils	26	2	24	07.69%	0–5	L8	2–11	0–13	2519	3059	82.35%

Updated to match(es) played on 18 August 1985. Source: NBL.com.au

== Playoff bracket ==
Elimination Finals
4	Canberra Cannons	110
5	Coburg Giants	87
3	Nunawading Spectres	97
6	Newcastle Falcons	103

Semifinals
1	Brisbane Bullets	93
4	Canberra Cannons	76
2	Adelaide 36ers	151
6	Newcastle Falcons	103

Grand Final
1	Brisbane Bullets	121
2	Adelaide 36ers	95

== Elimination Finals ==
=== (3) Canberra Cannons vs (5) Coburg Giants ===
ABC

24 August

boxscore

Canberra Cannons 110, Coburg Giants 87
Scoring by quarter: 19-22, 27-22, 24-19, 40-24
Pts: Herb McEachin 29; Rebs: Dave Nelson 11; Asts: Phil Smyth 7	Pts: Ray Borner 27; Rebs: Ray Borner 18; Asts: Borner, Carroll 4 each

AIS Arena, Canberra
Attendance: 5,200
Referees: Eddie Crouch, Trevor Dallas

=== (4) Nunawading Spectres vs (6) Newcastle Falcons ===
ABC

24 August

boxscore

Nunawading Spectres 97, Newcastle Falcons 103
Scoring by quarter: 20-26, 28-24, 18-22, 31-31
Pts: Ron Lemons 38; Rebs: Lemons, Cottrell 12 each Asts: Brendan Joyce 12	Pts: Ian Davies 26; Rebs: Jim Bateman 12; Asts: Ian Robilliard 4

The Glass House, Melbourne
Referees: Ray Hunt, Bill Mildenhall

== Semifinals ==
=== (2) Adelaide 36ers vs (6) Newcastle Falcons ===
SAS

31 August

boxscore

Adelaide 36ers 151, Newcastle Falcons 103
Scoring by quarter: 28-34, 42-27, 35-23, 46-19
Pts: Al Green 45; Rebs: Mark Davis 14; Asts: Darryl Pearce 6	Pts: Michael Johnson 37; Rebs: Jim Bateman 13; Asts: Ian Davies 2

Apollo Stadium, Adelaide
Attendance: 3,000
Referees: Eddie Crouch, Bill Mildenhall

=== (1) Brisbane Bullets vs (6) Canberra Cannons ===
TV0

31 August

boxscore

Brisbane Bullets 93, Canberra Cannons 76
Scoring by quarter: 26-20, 24-15, 18-22, 25-19
Pts: Leroy Loggins 28; Rebs: Leroy Loggins 12; Asts: Cal Bruton 7	Pts: Dave Nelson 17; Rebs: Phil Smyth 9 Asts: Jamie Kennedy 4

Sleeman Sports Centre, Brisbane
Attendance: 2,700
Referees: Ray Hunt, Geoff Weeks

== Grand Final ==
=== (1) Brisbane Bullets vs (2) Adelaide 36ers ===
TV0

7 September

boxscore

Brisbane Bullets 121, Adelaide 36ers 95
Scoring by quarter: 26-27, 29-18, 23-29, 43-21
Pts: Leroy Loggins 41; Rebs: Chris Mcgraw 10; Asts: Larry Sengstock 6	Pts: Mark Davis 28; Rebs: Mark Davis 18; Asts: Darryl Pearce 8
Brisbane wins the NBL Championship

Sleeman Sports Centre, Brisbane
Attendance: 2,700
Referees: Ray Hunt, Eddie Crouch

== See also ==
- 1985 NBL season
