= Dave Nelson (basketball) =

American basketball player and coach

Personal information
- Born: 1956 (age 69–70)
- Listed height: 204 cm (6 ft 8 in)
- Listed weight: 98 kg (216 lb)

Career information
- College: Fort Lewis (1977–1979)
- NBA draft: 1979: undrafted
- Playing career: 1981–1995
- Position: Power forward / center
- Coaching career: 1986–1988

Career history

Playing
- 1981–1985: Canberra Cannons
- 1986: Brisbane Bullets
- 1986–1987: Brisbane Brewers
- 1988: Canberra Cannons
- 1989–1994: Toowoomba Mountaineers
- 1995: Canberra Cannons

Coaching
- 1986: Brisbane Bullets (assistant/caretaker)
- 1987: Brisbane Lady Bullets
- 1988: Canberra Capitals

Career highlights
- 3× NBL champion (1983, 1984, 1988); 2× QBL champion (1990, 1991); All-NBL Team (1981); First-team All-RMAC (1979); Second-team All-RMAC (1978)

David Nelson (born c. 1956) is an American former professional basketball player and coach. He played two years of college basketball for the Fort Lewis Skyhawks before playing eight seasons in the Australian National Basketball League (NBL) between 1981 and 1995. He won three NBL championships with the Canberra Cannons in 1983, 1984 and 1988. He became a naturalised Australian during his playing career. He also served as a head coach in the Women's National Basketball League (WNBL) in 1987 and 1988.

== Early life ==
Nelson hails from Boulder, Colorado.

== College career ==
Nelson played two years of college basketball for the Fort Lewis Skyhawks between 1977 and 1979. He was named second-team All-RMAC as a junior in 1977–78 and first-team All-RMAC as a senior in 1978–79. He averaged 16.8 points as a junior and 19.0 points as a senior. As of 2022, his 1,058 career points ranked 28th all time in school history while his 455 career rebounds ranked 24th all time.

== Professional career ==
In 1979, Nelson moved to Australia to play in the Australian-American Amateur Basketball League. He was named the most valuable player in the league.

In 1981, Nelson debuted in the Australian National Basketball League (NBL) for the Canberra Cannons. He was named in the All-NBL Team in his first season after averaging a career-high 24.3 points per game. He played in the 1982 NBL All-Star Game and helped the Cannons win back-to-back NBL championships in 1983 and 1984. He was team captain in 1983 and reached 100 NBL games and 2,000 points in 1984. In 1985, he scored more than 500 points for the Cannons but was out of action at different times for an operation on his foot and two broken ribs. Following the 1985 season, coach Bob Turner announced that Nelson would not be retained.

In February 1986, Nelson was appointed assistant coach of the Brisbane Bullets under head coach Brian Kerle while also being appointed administrator of the Brisbane Basketball Association (BBA). He worked in a full-time capacity for BBA and played for their state league team, the Brisbane Brewers, averaging 33 points and 14 rebounds per game. He also joined the Bullets' playing group for the 1986 NBL season and served in a dual player-assistant role. In July 1986, he took over head coaching duties while Kerle was away with the Australian national team at the 1986 FIBA World Championship. Nelson served as caretaker player-coach for two games and recorded one win and one loss. He helped the Bullets reach the NBL grand final series, where they lost to the Adelaide 36ers. In 20 games for the Bullets in the 1986 NBL season, he averaged 9.0 points, 3.1 rebounds and 1.3 assists per game.

Nelson sat out the 1987 NBL season and instead played club basketball in Brisbane, where he "notched up his usual high tally of points with a constant flurry of three-pointers."

In October 1987, Nelson signed to return to the Cannons as a player for the 1988 NBL season as well as filling the promotions, public relations and marketing position. He helped the Cannons win 11 straight victories at the end of the season and then won 100–91 in Canberra against the Adelaide 36ers in game one of the best-of-three semi-final series. In game two, he made three successive three-pointers to put the Cannons on the way to a 100–95 victory and a grand-final berth against the North Melbourne Giants. After winning a third championship in 1988, he retired from the NBL with 166 games and over 3000 points.

Nelson had a five-year stint with the Toowoomba Mountaineers, where he won back-to-back Queensland Basketball League (QBL) championships in 1990 and 1991.

Nelson returned to the Cannons in 1995 as a 39-year-old and had a seven-game stint in the 1995 NBL season. In 173 career games in the NBL, he averaged 17.4 points, 4.5 rebounds and 1.2 assists per game.

== Player profile ==
Nelson was considered a dynamic power forward with a "line dry jumpshot". He was renowned for his hard-working game and his outside shots. At six foot eight, he was also listed as a center in the NBL.

== Coaching career ==
Nelson served as head coach of the Brisbane Lady Bullets of the Women's National Basketball League (WNBL) during the 1987 season.

After returning to Canberra, Nelson joined the Canberra Capitals as head coach for the 1988 WNBL season. The team missed the playoffs with a fifth-place finish and a 13–9 record.

== Personal life ==
In 1984, Nelson became eligible for Australian naturalisation. By 1986, he was a naturalised Australian.

Nelson's retirement from the NBL coincided with him starting a barbecue spare rib business in Canberra. He has been the owner and chef of two Mexican restaurants in Canberra, where he had a cult following for his ribs and wings.
