= List of NBL champions =

The National Basketball League (NBL) Championship Series (formerly Grand Final series) is the championship series at the conclusion of the NBL to determine the NBL champion. From 1986 to 2003, the league used a best-of-three series format. The 2004 series was changed to a to best-of-five format. In 2010, the series reverted to a best-of-three format again until 2017 when it switched back to best-of-five. The Perth Wildcats hold the record for the most championships, having won 10 grand finals.

== Champions ==
=== Legend ===
Bold	Winning team of the NBL Championship

=== NBL champions ===
Year	Home team	Result	Away team
1979	**St. Kilda Saints**	94–93	Canberra Cannons
1980	West Adelaide Bearcats	88–113	**St. Kilda Saints**
1981	**Launceston Casino City**	75–54	Nunawading Spectres
1982	**West Adelaide Bearcats**	80–74	Geelong Cats
1983	**Canberra Cannons**	75–73	West Adelaide Bearcats
1984	Brisbane Bullets	82–84	**Canberra Cannons**
1985	**Brisbane Bullets**	121–95	Adelaide 36ers
1986	**Adelaide 36ers**	2–1	Brisbane Bullets
1987	**Brisbane Bullets**	2–0	Perth Wildcats
1988	North Melbourne Giants	1–2	**Canberra Cannons**
1989	**North Melbourne Giants**	2–0	Canberra Cannons
1990	Brisbane Bullets	1–2	**Perth Wildcats**
1991	**Perth Wildcats**	2–1	Eastside Spectres
1992	**South East Melbourne Magic**	2–1	Melbourne Tigers
1993	Perth Wildcats	1–2	**Melbourne Tigers**
1994	**North Melbourne Giants**	2–0	Adelaide 36ers
1995	**Perth Wildcats**	2–1	North Melbourne Giants
1996	**South East Melbourne Magic**	2–1	Melbourne Tigers
1997	South East Melbourne Magic	1–2	**Melbourne Tigers**
1998	**Adelaide 36ers**	2–0	South East Melbourne Magic
1999	**Adelaide 36ers**	2–1	Victoria Titans
2000	**Perth Wildcats**	2–0	Victoria Titans
2001	**Wollongong Hawks**	2–1	Townsville Crocodiles
2002	**Adelaide 36ers**	2–1	West Sydney Razorbacks
2003	**Sydney Kings**	2–0	Perth Wildcats
2004	**Sydney Kings**	3–2	West Sydney Razorbacks
2005	**Sydney Kings**	3–0	Wollongong Hawks
2006	Sydney Kings	0–3	**Melbourne Tigers**
2007	**Brisbane Bullets**	3–1	Melbourne Tigers
2008	Sydney Kings	2–3	**Melbourne Tigers**
2009	**South Dragons**	3–2	Melbourne Tigers
2010	**Perth Wildcats**	2–1	Wollongong Hawks
2011	**New Zealand Breakers**	2–1	Cairns Taipans
2012	**New Zealand Breakers**	2–1	Perth Wildcats
2013	**New Zealand Breakers**	2–0	Perth Wildcats
2014	**Perth Wildcats**	2–1	Adelaide 36ers
2015	Cairns Taipans	0–2	**New Zealand Breakers**
2016	**Perth Wildcats**	2–1	New Zealand Breakers
2017	**Perth Wildcats**	3–0	Illawarra Hawks
2018	**Melbourne United**	3–2	Adelaide 36ers
2019	**Perth Wildcats**	3–1	Melbourne United
2020	Sydney Kings	1–2	**Perth Wildcats**
2021	**Melbourne United**	3–0	Perth Wildcats
2022	**Sydney Kings**	3–0	Tasmania JackJumpers
2023	**Sydney Kings**	3–2	New Zealand Breakers
2024	Melbourne United	2–3	**Tasmania JackJumpers**
2025	**Illawarra Hawks**	3–2	Melbourne United
2026	**Sydney Kings**	3–2	Adelaide 36ers

== Results by teams ==
Team	Win	Loss	Total	Win %	Year(s) won	Year(s) lost
Perth Wildcats	10	6	16	.625	1990, 1991, 1995, 2000, 2010, 2014, 2016, 2017, 2019, 2020	1987, 1993, 2003, 2012, 2013, 2021
Melbourne United (Note: Four championships won as the Melbourne Tigers. Rebranded as Melbourne United in 2014.)	6	7	13	.462	1993, 1997, 2006, 2008, 2018, 2021	1992, 1996, 2007, 2009, 2019, 2024, 2025
Sydney Kings	6	3	9	.667	2003, 2004, 2005, 2022, 2023, 2026	2006, 2008, 2020
Adelaide 36ers	4	5	9	.444	1986, 1998, 1999, 2002	1985, 1994, 2014, 2018, 2026
New Zealand Breakers	4	2	6	.667	2011, 2012, 2013, 2015	2016, 2023
Brisbane Bullets	3	3	6	.500	1985, 1987, 2007	1984, 1986, 1990
Canberra Cannons†	3	2	5	.600	1983, 1984, 1988	1979, 1989
Illawarra Hawks	2	3	5	.400	2001, 2025	2005, 2010, 2017
North Melbourne Giants†	2	2	4	.500	1989, 1994	1988, 1995
S.E. Melbourne Magic†	2	2	4	.500	1992, 1996	1997, 1998
Southern Melbourne Saints†	2	0	2	1.000	1979, 1980	—
West Adelaide Bearcats†	1	2	3	.333	1982	1980, 1983
Tasmania JackJumpers	1	1	2	.500	2024	2022
Launceston Casino City†	1	0	1	1.000	1981	—
South Dragons†	1	0	1	1.000	2009	—
Eastside Spectres†	0	2	2	.000	—	1981, 1991
Victoria Titans†	0	2	2	.000	—	1999, 2000
West Sydney Razorbacks†	0	2	2	.000	—	2002, 2004
Cairns Taipans	0	2	2	.000	—	2011, 2015
Geelong Supercats†	0	1	1	.000	—	1982
Townsville Crocodiles†	0	1	1	.000	—	2001

† indicates club is not a current member of the NBL.

=== Championships by city ===
City	State	Championships	Clubs
Melbourne	VIC	13	Melbourne United (6), North Melbourne Giants (2), South East Melbourne Magic (2), Southern Melbourne Saints (2), South Dragons (1)
Perth	WA	10	Perth Wildcats (10)
Sydney	NSW	6	Sydney Kings (6)
Adelaide	SA	5	Adelaide 36ers (4), West Adelaide Bearcats (1)
Auckland	NZ	4	New Zealand Breakers (4)
Brisbane	QLD	3	Brisbane Bullets (3)
Canberra	ACT	3	Canberra Cannons (3)
Wollongong	NSW	2	Illawarra Hawks (2)
Hobart	TAS	1	Tasmania JackJumpers (1)
Launceston	TAS	1	Launceston Casino City (1)

== See also ==
- NBL Finals
- NBL Championship
