= 1984 NBL Finals =

- League: National Basketball League
- Sport: Basketball
- Duration: 22 June – 1 July
- Number of teams: 8
- TV partner(s): ABC

Grand Final
- Champions: Canberra Cannons
- Runners-up: Brisbane Bullets
- Finals MVP: Not awarded

Seasons
- ← 1983 1985 →

The 1984 NBL Finals was the postseason tournament of the National Basketball League's 1984 season, which began in February. The finals began on 22 June. The tournament concluded with the Canberra Cannons defeating the Brisbane Bullets in the NBL Grand Final on 1 July.

== Format ==
The NBL finals series in 1984 consisted of the divisional finals, two semi-final games, and one championship-deciding grand final. The finals were contested between the top four teams of the regular season in each division, with the final four weekend split between the AIS Arena and The Glass House.

== Qualification ==
=== Qualified teams ===
Team	Division	Finals appearance	Previous appearance	Previous best performance
Geelong Cats	Western	3rd	1983	Runner-up (1982)
Canberra Cannons	Western	2nd	1983	Champions (1983)
Adelaide 36ers	Western	1st	N/A	N/A
Nunawading Spectres	Western	5th	1983	Runner-up (1981)
Brisbane Bullets	Eastern	3rd	1981	Semi-finalist (1980, 1981)
Coburg Giants	Eastern	3rd	1983	Semi-finalist (1982, 1983)
Newcastle Falcons	Eastern	2nd	1983	Divisional-Finalist (1983)
Illawarra Hawks	Eastern	1st	N/A	N/A

=== Ladder ===
Eastern Division

Pos	1984 NBL season											
Pos	Team	Pld	W	L	PCT	Last 5	Streak	Home	Away	PF	PA	PP
1	Brisbane Bullets	24	19	5	79.17%	4–1	W3	10–2	9–3	2546	2117	120.26%
2	Coburg Giants^{1}	24	18	6	75.00%	4–1	W3	11–1	7–5	3032	2579	117.56%
3	Newcastle Falcons^{1}	24	18	6	75.00%	3–2	W2	10–2	8–4	2674	2486	107.56%
4	Illawarra Hawks	24	13	11	54.17%	3–2	W2	7–5	6–6	2539	2488	102.05%
5	Melbourne Tigers ^{2}	24	11	13	45.83%	4–1	W2	8–4	3–9	2669	2584	103.29%
6	West Adelaide Bearcats ^{2}	24	11	13	45.83%	2–3	L1	8–4	3–9	2580	2660	96.99%
7	Bankstown Bruins ^{3}	24	10	14	41.67%	3–2	W1	7–5	3–9	2303	2380	96.76%
8	Frankston Bears ^{3}	24	10	14	41.67%	2–3	W1	8–4	2–10	2475	2576	96.08%
9	Sydney Supersonics	24	3	21	12.50%	0–5	L8	2–10	1–11	2170	2888	75.14%

Western Division

Pos	1984 NBL season											
Pos	Team	Pld	W	L	PCT	Last 5	Streak	Home	Away	PF	PA	PP
1	Geelong Cats	23	21	2	91.30%	4–1	W1	10–1	11–1	2735	2236	122.32%
2	Canberra Cannons^{4}	23	16	7	69.57%	4–1	W4	9–4	7–3	2514	2303	109.16%
3	Adelaide 36ers^{4}	23	16	7	69.57%	3–2	L2	9–2	7–5	2762	2590	106.64%
4	Nunawading Spectres	23	14	9	60.87%	2–3	L3	5–6	9–3	2410	2279	105.75%
5	St. Kilda Saints	23	9	14	39.13%	2–3	L1	5–6	4–8	2315	2446	94.64%
6	Hobart Devils^{5}	23	4	19	17.39%	0–5	L6	1–11	3–8	2340	2689	87.02%
7	Devonport Warriors^{5}	23	4	19	17.39%	1–4	W1	3–8	1–11	2257	2623	86.05%
8	Perth Wildcats	23	3	20	13.04%	2–3	L2	3–9	0–11	2176	2573	84.57%

Updated to match(es) played on 17 June 1984. Source: NBL.com.au

The NBL tie-breaker system as outlined in the NBL Rules and Regulations states that in the case of an identical win–loss record, the results in games played between the teams will determine order of seeding.

== Playoffs bracket ==
Preliminary / Elimination Finals
E1	Brisbane Bullets	105
E2	Coburg Giants	104
E3	Newcastle Falcons	108
E4	Illawarra Hawks	104
W3	Adelaide 36ers	101
W4	Nunawading Spectres	108
W1	Geelong Cats	81
W2	Canberra Cannons	87

Qualifying Finals
E2	Coburg Giants	132
E3	Newcastle Falcons	109
W1	Geelong Cats	115
W4	Nunawading Spectres	91

Semifinals
E1	Brisbane Bullets	107
W1	Geelong Cats	103
W2	Canberra Cannons	108
E2	Coburg Giants	107

Grand Final
E1	Brisbane Bullets	82
W2	Canberra Cannons	84

The top four teams in each division competed in a 1v2/3v4 elimination finals fixture between 22 June and 23 June, with the loser of 1v2 playing the winner of 3v4 for a spot in the Semifinals, while the winner of 1v2 qualified through to the Semifinals as well. The result2 were as follows:

== Divisional Finals ==
=== Western ===
==== (2) Canberra Cannons vs (1) Geelong Cats ====
22 June

Canberra Cannons 87, Geelong Cats 81

AIS Arena

==== (4) Nunawading Spectres vs (3) Adelaide 36ers ====
22 June

Nunawading Spectres 108, Adelaide 36ers 101

The Glass House

==== (1) Geelong Cats vs (4) Nunawading Spectres ====
23 June

Geelong Cats 115, Nunawading Spectres 91

AIS Arena

=== Eastern ===
==== (1) Brisbane Bullets vs (2) Coburg Giants ====
22 June

Brisbane Bullets 105, Coburg Giants 104

The Glass House

==== (3) Newcastle Falcons vs (4) Illawarra Hawks ====
22 June

Newcastle Falcons 108, Illawarra Hawks 101

Newcastle Sports Entertainment Centre

==== (3) Newcastle Falcons vs (2) Coburg Giants ====
23 June

Newcastle Falcons 109, Coburg Giants 132

AIS Arena

== Semifinals ==
=== (2) Canberra Cannons vs (2) Coburg Giants ===
ABC

29 June

boxscore

Canberra Cannons 108, Coburg Giants 107
Pts: Herb McEachin 30; Rebs: Mark Dalton 14; Asts: Phil Smyth 12	Pts: Benny Lewis 27; Rebs: Ray Borner 16; Asts: Mark Wright 2

AIS Arena, Canberra
Referees: Eddie Crouch, Ray Hunt

=== (1) Geelong Cats vs (1) Brisbane Bullets ===
ABC

29 June

boxscore

Geelong Cats 103, Brisbane Bullets 107
Pts: Cal Bruton 31; Rebs: James Crawford 12; Asts: Tied 2	Pts: Leroy Loggins 32; Rebs: Tied 8 Asts: Ron Radliff 3

The Glass House, Melbourne
Referees: John Holden, Bill Mildenhall

== Grand Final ==
=== (1) Brisbane Bullets vs (2) Canberra Cannons ===
ABC

1 July

boxscore

Brisbane Bullets 82, Canberra Cannons 84
Pts: Leroy Loggins 28; Rebs: Leroy Loggins 10; Asts: Multiple 2	Pts: Phil Smyth 20; Rebs: Herb McEachin 9 Asts: Phil Smyth 7
Canberra wins the NBL Championship

The Glass House, Melbourne
Referees: John Holden, Eddie Crouch

== See also ==
- 1984 NBL season
