= Herb McEachin =

American-Australian basketball player

Personal information
- Born: 29 November 1954 (age 71) Hamlet, North Carolina, U.S.
- Listed height: 195 cm (6 ft 5 in)
- Listed weight: 83 kg (183 lb)

Career information
- High school: Vallejo (Vallejo, California)
- College: Oregon Tech (1973–1977)
- NBA draft: 1977: undrafted
- Playing career: 1979–1992
- Position: Guard / forward

Career history
- 1979–1992: Canberra Cannons

Career highlights
- 3× NBL champion (1983, 1984, 1988); All-NBL Team (1980); NBL 20th Anniversary Team (1998); No. 15 retired by Canberra Cannons; 4× All-Evergreen (1974–1977)

Herbert McEachin (born 29 November 1954) is an American-Australian former professional basketball player. He played college basketball for the Oregon Tech Hustlin' Owls from 1973 to 1977 and set program records in scoring and rebounds. McEachin played his entire professional career in Australia with the Canberra Cannons of the National Basketball League (NBL). He was named to the inaugural All-NBL Team in 1980 and won three NBL championships in 1983, 1984 and 1988.

== Early life ==
McEachin was born in Hamlet, North Carolina. He played basketball at Vallejo High School in Vallejo, California, and averaged 17 points per game during his senior season.

== College career ==
McEachin played college basketball for the Oregon Tech Hustlin' Owls from 1973 to 1977. He was named to the All-Evergreen Conference team every season he played. McEachin's 1,087 career rebounds are the highest in program history while his 1,676 career points were the highest for 30 years.

McEachin was inducted into the Oregon Tech Athletics Hall of Fame in 2023.

== Professional career ==
McEachin was recommended to play in Australia by Willie Anderson, a fellow basketball player from Vallejo who was a player and coach there. He spent his first season playing for Ryde in Sydney and was named as most valuable player after leading the team to the New South Wales second division title. The following year, the professional National Basketball League (NBL) was formed and McEachin joined the Canberra Cannons.

McEachin played 14 seasons in the NBL for the Cannons. Standing at 195 cm (6 ft 5 in), he played as a guard and forward. McEachin was named to the inaugural All-NBL Team in 1980. He won NBL championships with the Cannons in 1983, 1984 and 1988. McEachin was the first player in the NBL to surpass 2,000 career points, and the first to play in 300 games. He retired in 1993 after appearing in 341 games with an average of 17.2 points per game. McEachin's number 15 was retired by the Cannons.

McEachin was inducted into the Australian Basketball Hall of Fame in 1998. He was named to the NBL 20th Anniversary Team in 1998.

== Personal life ==
McEachin acquired Australian citizenship in 1989. His son, Shawn, worked as a coach for the Canberra Gunners.
