= 1983 NBL Finals =

- League: National Basketball League
- Sport: Basketball
- Duration: 23 June – 4 July
- Number of teams: 8
- TV partner(s): ABC

Grand Final
- Champions: Canberra Cannons
- Runners-up: West Adelaide Bearcats
- Finals MVP: Not awarded

Seasons
- ← 1982 1984 →

The 1983 NBL Finals was the postseason tournament of the National Basketball League's 1983 season, which began in February. The finals began on 23 June. The tournament concluded with the Canberra Cannons defeating the West Adelaide Bearcats in the NBL Grand Final on 4 July.

== Format ==
The NBL finals series in 1983 consisted of the divisional finals (which was a round-robin fixture for the top eight teams), two semifinal games, and one championship-deciding grand final. The finals were contested between the top eight teams of the regular season, with the final four weekend split between two Melbourne venues – Burwood Stadium and Kilsyth Stadium.

== Qualification ==
=== Qualified teams ===
Team	Division	Finals appearance	Previous appearance	Previous best performance
Sydney Supersonics	Eastern	1st	N/A	N/A
Geelong Cats	Western	2nd	1982	Runner-up (1982)
West Adelaide Bearcats	Eastern	4th	1982	Champions (1982)
Canberra Cannons	Western	1st	N/A	N/A (1979 Grand Finalist)
Nunawading Spectres	Western	4th	1982	Runner-up (1981)
Coburg Giants	Eastern	2nd	1982	Semi-finalist (1982)
Newcastle Falcons	Eastern	1st	N/A	N/A
St Kilda Saints	Western	2nd	1980	Champions (1980)

=== Ladder ===
Eastern Division

Pos	1983 NBL season											
Pos	Team	Pld	W	L	PCT	Last 5	Streak	Home	Away	PF	PA	PP
1	Sydney Supersonics	22	19	3	86.36%	4–1	W2	11–0	8–3	1956	1710	114.39%
2	West Adelaide Bearcats	22	17	5	77.27%	4–1	W4	10–1	7–4	2180	1972	110.55%
3	Coburg Giants^{1}	22	13	9	59.09%	1–4	L1	9–2	4–7	1976	1920	102.92%
4	Newcastle Falcons^{1}	22	13	9	59.09%	3–2	L1	8–3	5–6	2143	2076	103.23%
5	Brisbane Bullets	22	10	12	45.45%	4–1	W3	6–5	4–7	1734	1763	98.36%
6	Frankston Bears	22	6	16	27.27%	0–5	L6	3–8	3–8	1809	1863	97.10%
7	Illawarra Hawks	22	4	18	18.18%	3–2	L1	3–8	1–10	1929	2128	90.65%
8	Devonport Warriors	22	2	20	09.09%	1–4	W1	1–10	1–10	1674	2068	80.95%

Western Division

Pos	1983 NBL season											
Pos	Team	Pld	W	L	PCT	Last 5	Streak	Home	Away	PF	PA	PP
1	Geelong Cats	22	18	4	81.82%	5–0	W6	9–2	9–2	1953	1736	112.50%
2	Canberra Cannons	22	16	6	72.73%	4–1	W1	9–2	7–4	2049	1777	115.31%
3	Nunawading Spectres	22	15	7	68.18%	3–2	W1	9–2	6–5	1964	1760	111.59%
4	St. Kilda Saints^{2}	22	12	10	54.55%	2–3	W1	8–3	4–7	1971	1942	101.49%
5	Bankstown Bruins^{2}	22	12	10	54.55%	3–2	L1	6–5	6–5	1737	1728	100.52%
6	Adelaide 36ers	22	11	11	50.00%	2–3	L1	7–4	4–7	2002	2047	97.80%
7	Westate Wildcats	22	6	16	27.27%	0–5	L5	5–6	1–10	1929	2171	88.85%
8	Hobart Devils	22	2	20	09.09%	0–5	L10	2–9	0–11	1757	2102	83.59%

Updated to match(es) played on 18 June 1983. Source: NBL.com.au

The NBL tie-breaker system as outlined in the NBL Rules and Regulations states that in the case of an identical win–loss record, the results in games played between the teams will determine order of seeding.

=== Divisional Finals ===
Date	Home	Score	Away	Box Score		
23/06/1983	Coburg Giants	79–80	Sydney Supersonics	{{{venue}}}	{{{crowd}}}	boxscore
24/06/1983	St. Kilda Saints	94–95	Geelong Cats	{{{venue}}}	{{{crowd}}}	boxscore
24/06/1983	West Adelaide Bearcats	93–86	Newcastle Falcons	{{{venue}}}	{{{crowd}}}	boxscore
24/06/1983	Canberra Cannons	89–81	Nunawading Spectres	{{{venue}}}	{{{crowd}}}	boxscore
25/06/1983	Geelong Cats	81–86	Canberra Cannons	{{{venue}}}	{{{crowd}}}	boxscore
25/06/1983	Nunawading Spectres	109–75	St. Kilda Saints	{{{venue}}}	{{{crowd}}}	boxscore
25/06/1983	Newcastle Falcons	87–101	Coburg Giants	{{{venue}}}	{{{crowd}}}	boxscore
25/06/1983	Sydney Supersonics	78–91	West Adelaide Bearcats	{{{venue}}}	{{{crowd}}}	boxscore
26/06/1983	Nunawading Spectres	107–74	Geelong Cats	{{{venue}}}	{{{crowd}}}	boxscore
26/06/1983	Sydney Supersonics	101–94	Newcastle Falcons	{{{venue}}}	{{{crowd}}}	boxscore
26/06/1983	Canberra Cannons	104–85	St. Kilda Saints	{{{venue}}}	{{{crowd}}}	boxscore
26/06/1983	Coburg Giants	105–104	West Adelaide Bearcats	{{{venue}}}	{{{crowd}}}	boxscore

=== Round Robin (East) ===
Pos	Team	Pld	W	L	PF	PA	PD	Qualification
1	West Adelaide Bearcats	3	2	1	288	269	+19	Qualification to semifinals
2	Coburg Giants	3	2	1	285	271	+14	Qualification to semifinals
3	Sydney Supersonics	3	2	1	259	264	−5	
4	Newcastle Falcons	3	0	3	267	295	−28	

Source: websites.sportstg.com/

=== Round Robin (West) ===
Pos	Team	Pld	W	L	PF	PA	PD	Qualification
1	Canberra Cannons	3	3	0	279	247	+32	Qualification to semifinals
2	Nunawading Spectres	3	2	1	297	238	+59	Qualification to semifinals
3	Geelong Cats	3	1	2	250	287	−37	
4	St. Kilda Saints	3	0	3	254	308	−54	

Source: websites.sportstg.com/

=== Results ===
Team	Record	Points differential	Semi-finals seed
Sydney Supersonics	2–1	-5	N/A
Geelong Cats	1–2	-37	N/A
West Adelaide Bearcats	2–1	+19	#3
Canberra Cannons	3–0	+32	#1
Nunawading Spectres	2–1	+59	#2
Coburg Giants	2–1	+14	#4
Newcastle Falcons	0–3	-28	N/A
St. Kilda Saints	0–3	-54	N/A

== Playoff bracket ==
Semifinals
1	Canberra Cannons	80
4	Coburg Giants	75
2	Nunawading Spectres	77
3	West Adelaide Bearcats	84

Grand Final
1	Canberra Cannons	75
2	West Adelaide Bearcats	73

=== Semifinals ===
Date	Home	Score	Away	Box Score		
1/07/1983	Nunawading Spectres	77–84	West Adelaide Bearcats	{{{venue}}}	{{{crowd}}}	boxscore
1/07/1983	Canberra Cannons	80–75	Coburg Giants	{{{venue}}}	{{{crowd}}}	boxscore

=== Grand Final ===
Date	Home	Score	Away	Box Score		
4/07/1983	Canberra Cannons	75–73	West Adelaide Bearcats	{{{venue}}}	{{{crowd}}}	boxscore

== See also ==
- 1983 NBL season
