= NBL Championship Series Most Valuable Player Award =

Annual National Basketball League award

The National Basketball League Championship Series Most Valuable Player, formerly known as the Grand Final MVP, is an annual National Basketball League (NBL) award given since the league's inaugural season to the best performing player of the Championship Series. The winner receives the Larry Sengstock Medal, which is named in honour of Larry Sengstock, the winner of the league's first Grand Final MVP award. The league named the award after Sengstock in 1999.

Between 1979 and 2022, the single game or series was known as the NBL Grand Final. With the league's change in finals format in 2023, the grand final name was replaced by Championship Series. Derrick Walton of the Sydney Kings won the first Championship Series MVP in 2023. In 2025, Matthew Dellavedova of Melbourne United became just the second player after Ricky Grace in 1993 to win the Championship Series MVP from the losing side.

== Winners ==
Denotes players that won the award on the losing team.

Year	Player	Nationality	Team
1979	Larry Sengstock	Australia	St. Kilda Saints
1980	Rocky Smith	United States	St. Kilda Saints
1981	Cliff Martin	United States	Launceston Casino City
1982	Leroy Loggins	United States	West Adelaide Bearcats
1983	Phil Smyth	Australia	Canberra Cannons
1984	N/A	N/A	N/A
1985	N/A	N/A	N/A
1986	Mark Davis	United States	Adelaide 36ers
1987	Leroy Loggins (2)	United States	Brisbane Bullets
1988	Phil Smyth (2)	Australia	Canberra Cannons
1989	Scott Fisher	United States	North Melbourne Giants
1990	Ricky Grace	United States	Perth Wildcats
1991	Peter Hansen	United States	Perth Wildcats
1992	Bruce Bolden	Australia	South East Melbourne Magic
1993	Ricky Grace (2)	United States	Perth Wildcats
1994	Paul Rees	Australia	North Melbourne Giants
1995	Andrew Vlahov	Australia	Perth Wildcats
1996	Mike Kelly	Australia	South East Melbourne Magic
1997	Lanard Copeland	United States	Melbourne Tigers
1998	Kevin Brooks	United States	Adelaide 36ers
1999	Brett Maher	Australia	Adelaide 36ers
2000	Marcus Timmons	United States	Perth Wildcats
2001	Glen Saville	Australia	Wollongong Hawks
2002	Brett Maher (2)	Australia	Adelaide 36ers
2003	Chris Williams	United States	Sydney Kings
2004	Matthew Nielsen	Australia	Sydney Kings
2005	Jason Smith	Australia	Sydney Kings
2006	Chris Anstey	Australia	Melbourne Tigers
2007	Sam Mackinnon	Australia	Brisbane Bullets
2008	Chris Anstey (2)	Australia	Melbourne Tigers
2009	Donta Smith	United States	South Dragons
2010	Kevin Lisch	United States	Perth Wildcats
2011	Thomas Abercrombie	New Zealand	New Zealand Breakers
2012	C. J. Bruton	Australia	New Zealand Breakers
2013	Cedric Jackson	United States	New Zealand Breakers
2014	Jermaine Beal	United States	Perth Wildcats
2015	Cedric Jackson (2)	United States	New Zealand Breakers
2016	Damian Martin	Australia	Perth Wildcats
2017	Bryce Cotton	United States	Perth Wildcats
2018	Chris Goulding	Australia	Melbourne United
2019	Terrico White	United States	Perth Wildcats
2020	Bryce Cotton (2)	United States	Perth Wildcats
2021	Jock Landale	Australia	Melbourne United
2022	Xavier Cooks	Australia	Sydney Kings
2023	Derrick Walton	United States	Sydney Kings
2024	Jack McVeigh	Australia	Tasmania JackJumpers
2025	Matthew Dellavedova	Australia	Melbourne United
2026	Kendric Davis	United States	Sydney Kings

== See also ==
- WNBL Grand Final Most Valuable Player Award
