= 2015 NBL Finals =

- League: National Basketball League
- Sport: Basketball
- Duration: February 2015–March 2015
- Teams: 4
- TV partner: Network Ten (Australia) One (Australia) Sky Sport (New Zealand) NBL.TV (online) LiveBasketball.TV (online)

NBL Finals
- Champions: New Zealand Breakers
- Runners-up: Cairns Taipans
- Finals MVP: Cedric Jackson

Seasons
- ← 2014 2016 →

The 2015 NBL Finals was the championship series of the 2014–15 NBL season and the conclusion of the season's playoffs. The New Zealand Breakers defeated the Cairns Taipans in two games (2–0) to claim their fourth NBL championship.

== Format ==
The 2014–15 National Basketball League Finals will be played in February and March 2015 between the top four teams of the regular season, consisting of two best-of-three semi-final and final series, where the higher seed hosts the first and third games.

== Qualification ==
=== Qualified teams ===
Team	Date of qualification	Round of qualification	Finals appearance	Previous appearance	Previous best performance
New Zealand Breakers	25 January 2015	16	6th	2013	Champions (2011, 2012, 2013)
Cairns Taipans	30 January 2015	17	5th	2011	Runners-up (2011)
Perth Wildcats	7 February 2015	18	29th	2014	Champions (1990, 1991, 1995, 2000, 2010, 2014)
Adelaide 36ers	13 February 2015	19	23rd	2014	Champions (1986, 1998, 1999, 2002)

=== Ladder ===
Pos	2014–15 NBL season											
Pos	Team	Pld	W	L	PCT	Last 5	Streak	Home	Away	PF	PA	PP
1	Cairns Taipans	28	21	7	75.00%	4–1	W3	12–2	9–5	2275	2117	107.46%
2	New Zealand Breakers	28	19	9	67.86%	2–3	L1	10–4	9–5	2343	2275	102.99%
3	Adelaide 36ers	28	17	11	60.71%	5–0	W10	9–5	8–6	2501	2478	100.93%
4	Perth Wildcats	28	16	12	57.14%	3–2	W1	10–4	6–8	2260	2171	104.10%
5	Melbourne United	28	13	15	46.43%	2–3	W2	8–6	5–9	2333	2379	98.07%
6	Townsville Crocodiles	28	11	17	39.29%	3–2	L1	8–6	3–11	2343	2341	100.09%
7	Sydney Kings	28	9	19	32.14%	0–5	L7	5–9	4–10	2320	2408	96.35%
8	Wollongong Hawks	28	6	22	21.43%	2–3	L2	4–10	2–12	2154	2360	91.27%

Updated to match(es) played on 22 February 2015. Source: NBL.com.au

=== Ladder Progression ===
- Numbers highlighted in green indicate that the team finished the round inside the top four.
- Numbers highlighted in blue indicates the team finished first on the ladder in that round.
- Numbers highlighted in red indicates the team finished last place on the ladder in that round.

2014–15 NBL season
Team	1	2	3	4	5	6	7	8	9	10	11	12	13	14	15	16	17	18	19	20
Adelaide 36ers	5	5	4	3	4	6	7	7	7	7	7	6	6	5	5	4	4	4	4	3
Cairns Taipans	1	1	1	1	1	2	3	3	3	3	2	2	3	2	2	1	1	1	1	1
Melbourne United	8	7	7	6	7	4	4	4	4	4	4	4	4	4	4	5	5	5	5	5
New Zealand Breakers	2	2	3	4	3	3	1	1	2	1	1	1	1	1	1	2	2	2	2	2
Perth Wildcats	7	3	2	2	2	1	2	2	1	2	3	3	2	3	3	3	3	3	3	4
Sydney Kings	3	4	6	7	5	5	5	5	5	5	5	5	5	6	6	6	6	7	7	7
Townsville Crocodiles	6	6	5	5	6	7	6	6	6	6	6	7	7	7	7	7	7	6	6	6
Wollongong Hawks	4	8	8	8	8	8	8	8	8	8	8	8	8	8	8	8	8	8	8	8

=== Seedings ===
1. Cairns Taipans
2. New Zealand Breakers
3. Adelaide 36ers
4. Perth Wildcats

The NBL tie-breaker system as outlined in the NBL Rules and Regulations states that in the case of an identical win–loss record, the results in games played between the teams will determine order of seeding.

== Bracket ==
Semifinals
1	Cairns Taipans	71	80	X
4	Perth Wildcats	64	66	X
2	New Zealand Breakers	111	94	X
3	Adelaide 36ers	82	83	X

Grand Final
1	Cairns Taipans	71	81	X
2	New Zealand Breakers	86	83	X

== Semi-finals series ==
=== (1) Cairns Taipans vs (4) Perth Wildcats ===
27 February 2015	Cairns Taipans	71–64 (Series: Cairns leads series, 1–0)	Perth Wildcats	Cairns Convention Centre, Cairns
7:30pm EST	Scoring by quarter: 15-18, 28-12, 2-18, 26-16
One	Pts: Scottie Wilbekin 28; Rebs: Scottie Wilbekin 10; Asts: Scottie Wilbekin 4	boxscore	Pts: Jermaine Beal 20; Rebs: Matthew Knight 9 Asts: Damian Martin 5	Attendance: TBA; Referees: Raoul Kirsten, Scott Beker, Matt Beattie

1 March 2015	Perth Wildcats	68–80 (Series: Cairns wins series, 2–0)	Cairns Taipans	Perth Arena, Perth
6:30pm WST	Scoring by quarter: 11-14, 15-22, 18-16, 24-28
One	Pts: Jermaine Beal 21; Rebs: Knight, Wagstaff 10; Asts: Jermaine Beal 4	boxscore	Pts: Wilbekin, Weigh 16; Rebs: Scottie Wilbekin 11; Asts: Scottie Wilbekin 6	Attendance: 15,235; Referees: Michael Aylen, Matt Townsend, Brad Giersch Emergency Referee: David Bull

Regular season series

Tied 2–2 in the regular season series; 303-291 points differential to Cairns:

28 November 2014	Perth Wildcats	84–66	Cairns Taipans	Perth Arena, Perth

9 January 2015	Cairns Taipans	91–76	Perth Wildcats	Cairns Convention Centre, Cairns

24 January 2015	Cairns Taipans	92–66	Perth Wildcats	Cairns Convention Centre, Cairns

6 February 2015	Perth Wildcats	65–54	Cairns Taipans	Perth Arena, Perth

=== (2) New Zealand Breakers vs (3) Adelaide 36ers ===
26 February 2015	New Zealand Breakers	111–82 (Series: New Zealand leads series, 1–0)	Adelaide 36ers	Vector Arena, Auckland
7:30pm NZDT	Scoring by quarter: 31-25, 25-16, 33-15, 22-26
One	Pts: Corey Webster 24; Rebs: Mika Vukona 10; Asts: Cedric Jackson 10	boxscore	Pts: Jamar Wilson 21; Rebs: Daniel Johnson 8 Asts: Adam Gibson 7	Attendance: 3,833; Referees: Vaughan Mayberry, Brett Hogan, Tim Boswell

28 February 2015	Adelaide 36ers	83–94 (Series: New Zealand wins series, 2–0)	New Zealand Breakers	Adelaide Arena, Adelaide
7:30pm CDT	Scoring by quarter: 25-28, 14-21, 14-21, 30-24
One	Pts: Jackson, Ibekwe 18; Rebs: Cedric Jackson 10; Asts: Cedric Jackson 6	boxscore	Pts: Jamar Wilson 23; Rebs: Brock Motum 8 Asts: Jamar Wilson 4	Attendance: 4,807; Referees: Chris Reid, Tim Mills, ?

Tied 2–2 in the regular season series; 356-340 points differential to New Zealand:

17 October 2014	New Zealand Breakers	101–80	Adelaide 36ers	Vector Arena, Auckland

2 November 2014	Adelaide 36ers	93–86	New Zealand Breakers	Adelaide Arena, Adelaide

4 January 2015	Adelaide 36ers	74–81	New Zealand Breakers	Adelaide Arena, Adelaide

12 February 2015	New Zealand Breakers	88–93	Adelaide 36ers	Vector Arena, Auckland

== Grand Final series ==
=== (1) Cairns Taipans vs (2) New Zealand Breakers ===
6 March 2015	Cairns Taipans	71–86 (Series: New Zealand leads series, 1–0)	New Zealand Breakers	Cairns Convention Centre, Cairns
7:30pm EST	Scoring by quarter: 17-28, 17-22, 26-11, 11-25
One	Pts: Scottie Wilbekin 16; Rebs: Cameron Gliddon 9 Asts: Stephen Weigh 4	boxscore	Pts: Cedric Jackson 22; Rebs: Ekene Ibekwe 8 Asts: Jackson, Webster 3	Attendance: TBA; Referees: Vaughan Mayberry, Chris Reid, Matt Beattie

8 March 2015	New Zealand Breakers	83–81 (Series: New Zealand wins series, 2–0)	Cairns Taipans	North Shore Events Centre, Auckland
3:00pm NZDT	Scoring by quarter: 23-17, 21-22, 14-20, 25-22
Network Ten	Pts: Thomas Abercrombie 19; Rebs: Mika Vukona 8 Asts: Cedric Jackson 6	boxscore	Pts: Cameron Tragardh 17; Rebs: Loughton, Young 6 Asts: Scottie Wilbekin 4	Attendance: TBA; Referees: Michael Aylen, Scott Beker, Brad Giersch

Regular season series

Cairns won 3–1 in the regular season series:

23 October 2014	New Zealand Breakers	76–85	Cairns Taipans	North Shore Events Centre, Auckland

7 November 2014	Cairns Taipans	71–79	New Zealand Breakers	Cairns Convention Centre, Cairns

21 December 2014	Cairns Taipans	83–59	New Zealand Breakers	Cairns Convention Centre, Cairns

22 February 2015	New Zealand Breakers	77–81	Cairns Taipans	Vector Arena, Auckland

== See also ==
- 2014–15 NBL season
