= NBL Finals =

Basketball tournament

- Current season, competition or edition: 2026 NBL Finals
- Logo of the finals sponsored by Hungry Jack's
- Sport: Basketball
- Founded: 1979
- No. of teams: 6
- Most recent champions: Sydney Kings (6th title)
- Most titles: Perth Wildcats (10 titles)
- Broadcasters: Australia: ESPN; Nine Network; 9Go!; New Zealand: Sky Sport
- Streaming partners: Kayo Sports; Disney+; 9Now; NBL TV
- Website: NBL.com.au

The National Basketball League (NBL) Finals is a tournament held at the end of each NBL season to determine the league champions.

The top six teams qualify for the finals based on their regular season performance. The current Finals format consists of four rounds: two sudden-death play-in games, followed by the best-of-three Semifinals and the best-of-five NBL Championship series.

== Format ==
=== 1980–1983 ===
Semifinals
1
4
2
3

Grand Final

=== 1984 ===
Preliminary / Elimination finals
1
4
5
8
6
7
2
3

Qualifying finals

Semifinals

Grand final

=== 1985 ===
Elimination Finals
4
5
3
6

Semifinals
1
2

Grand Final

=== 1986 ===
Elimination Finals
4
5
3
6

Semifinals
1
2

Grand Final

=== 1987–1988 ===
Elimination Finals
4
5
3
6

Semifinals
1
2

Grand Final

=== 1989–1991 ===
Elimination Finals
4
5
3
6

Semifinals
1
2

Grand Final

=== 1992–1996 ===
Quarterfinals
1
8
4
5
3
6
2
7

Semifinals

Grand Final

=== 1997–1998 ===
Elimination Finals
4
5
3
6

Semifinals
1
2

Grand Final

=== 1999; 2001–2003 ===
Qualifying Finals
1	Seed 1
6	Seed 6
2	Seed 2
5	Seed 5
3	Seed 3
4	Seed 4

Semifinals
1
2

Grand Final

The top six teams at the end of the regular season advance to the finals under this playoff system:

- The first round of the postseason sees the team that finishes in first place at the end of the regular season against the team that finishes sixth; second plays fifth, and third plays fourth.
- The three teams that win their respective best-of-three first-round series advances, and is joined in the semifinals by the highest-placed losing team from the first round.
- Teams are then seeded again for the best-of-three semifinal series. The three winning teams from the first round are seeded in order of their regular-season finishing positions, and the first-round loser automatically becomes the No. 4 seed.
- The two winning teams from the semifinals meet in a best-of-three Grand Final series to determine the champion.

=== 2000 ===
Elimination Finals
4
5
3
6

Semifinals
1
2

Grand Final

=== 2004–2008 ===
Elimination Finals
5
8
6
7

Quarterfinals
4
3

Semifinals
1
2

Grand Final

=== 2009 ===
Elimination Finals
4
5
3
6

Semifinals
1
2

Grand Final

=== 2010–2016 ===
Semifinals
1
4
2
3

Grand Final

=== 2017–2022 ===
Semifinals
1
4
2
3

Grand Final

The top four teams at the end of the regular season advance to the finals under this playoff system:

- The semifinals of the postseason sees the team that finishes in first place at the end of the regular season against the team that finishes fourth; and second plays third. All four teams play a best-of-three semifinal series.
- The two winning teams from the semifinals meet in a best-of-five Grand Final series to determine the champion.

=== 2023–present ===
Play-in / Seeding qualifier
5
6
3
4

Play-in game

Semifinals
1
2

Championship

== List of finals ==
This is a complete listing of National Basketball League (NBL) Finals series, grouped by franchise. Series featuring relocated and/or renamed teams are kept with their ultimate relocation franchises. Bolded years indicate wins. Years in italics indicate series in progress. Tables are sorted first by the number of series, then the number of wins, and then by year of first occurrence.

=== Adelaide 36ers ===
Opponent	S	Occurrences	GP	Rec	%
Brisbane Bullets	4	1985, **1986**, **1994**, 2005	8	4–4	.500
Cairns Taipans	1	2006	1	0–1	.000
Canberra Cannons	1	1988	2	0–2	.000
Eastside Spectres	1	1984	1	0–1	.000
Illawarra Hawks	5	**1986**, **1999**, 2001, **2002**, 2017	11	7–4	.636
Melbourne United	5	**1991**, **1994**, 2004, **2014**, 2018	13	8–5	.615
Newcastle Falcons	2	**1985**, **1995**	4	3–1	.750
New Zealand Breakers	2	2009, 2015	3	0–3	.000
North Melbourne Giants	1	1994	2	0–2	.000
Perth Wildcats	10	1987, 1989, 1991, 1995, **1996**, **1998**, **1999**, 2003, 2014, **2018**	25	12–13	.480
S.E. Melbourne Magic	3	1992, 1996, **1998**	6	2–4	.333
S.E. Melbourne Phoenix	1	2025	1	0–1	.000
Sydney Kings	1	**2025**	1	1–0	1.000
Victoria Titans	4	**1999**, 2000, **2001**, **2002**	12	7–5	.583
West Sydney Razorbacks	1	**2002**	3	2–1	.667
Totals	42		93	46–47	.495

As of the end of the 2025 season

=== Brisbane Bullets ===
Opponent	S	Occurrences	GP	Rec	%
Adelaide 36ers	4	**1985**, 1986, 1994, **2005**	8	4–4	.500
Canberra Cannons	3	1984, **1985**, **1986**	3	2–1	.667
Eastside Spectres	1	**1990**	2	2–0	1.000
Geelong Cats	1	**1984**	1	1–0	1.000
Hunter Pirates	1	**2005**	1	1–0	1.000
Illawarra Hawks	1	**1987**	3	2–1	.667
Launceston Casino City	1	1981	1	0–1	.000
Melbourne United	6	1996, **1998**, 1999, **2004**, **2007**, 2008	14	7–7	.500
Newcastle Falcons	1	**1993**	2	2–0	1.000
New Zealand Breakers	1	**2008**	1	1–0	1.000
North Melbourne Giants	2	**1984**, 1995	3	1–2	.333
Perth Wildcats	7	**1987**, 1988, 1990, 1993, 1997, 2006, 2019	14	4–10	.286
S.E. Melbourne Magic	1	1998	2	0–2	.000
Sydney Kings	6	**1986**, **1990**, 1992, 2004, 2005, **2007**	12	5–7	.417
West Adelaide Bearcats	1	1980	1	0–1	.000
Totals	37		68	32–36	.471

As of the end of the 2019 season

=== Cairns Taipans ===
Opponent	S	Occurrences	GP	Rec	%
Adelaide 36ers	1	**2006**	1	1–0	1.000
Hunter Pirates	1	**2006**	1	1–0	1.000
Melbourne United	1	2007	2	0–2	.000
New Zealand Breakers	3	2008, 2011, 2015	6	1–5	.167
Perth Wildcats	6	**2004**, **2007**, **2015**, 2017, 2020, **2023**	10	6–4	.600
South Dragons	1	**2007**	1	1–0	1.000
Sydney Kings	2	2006, 2023	5	1–4	.200
Tasmania JackJumpers	1	2023	1	0–1	.000
Townsville Crocodiles	1	**2011**	3	2–1	.667
West Sydney Razorbacks	1	2004	1	0–1	.000
Totals	18		31	13–18	.419

As of the end of the 2023 season

=== Illawarra Hawks ===
Opponent	S	Occurrences	GP	Rec	%
Adelaide 36ers	5	1986, 1999, **2001**, 2002, **2017**	11	4–7	.364
Brisbane Bullets	1	1987	3	1–2	.333
Melbourne United	4	1993, 1994, 2024, **2025**	12	4–8	.333
Newcastle Falcons	1	1984	1	0–1	.000
New Zealand Breakers	1	**2024**	1	1–0	1.000
North Melbourne Giants	2	**1987**, 1992	3	1–2	.333
Perth Wildcats	10	1998, **2001**, 2003, 2006, 2010, 2013, 2014, 2016, 2017, 2021	24	5–19	.208
S.E. Melbourne Magic	1	1995	3	1–2	.333
S.E. Melbourne Phoenix	1	**2025**	3	2–1	.667
Sydney Kings	2	2005, 2022	5	0–5	.000
Tasmania JackJumpers	1	2024	1	0–1	.000
Townsville Crocodiles	4	**2001**, **2003**, **2005**, **2010**	10	8–2	.800
Victoria Titans	1	1999	2	0–2	.000
West Sydney Razorbacks	2	**1986**, 2004	3	1–2	.333
Totals	36		82	28–54	.341

As of the end of the 2025 season

=== Melbourne United ===
Opponent	S	Occurrences	GP	Rec	%
Adelaide 36ers	5	1991, 1994, **2004**, 2014, **2018**	13	5–8	.385
Brisbane Bullets	6	**1996**, 1998, **1999**, 2004, 2007, **2008**	14	7–7	.500
Cairns Taipans	1	**2007**	2	2–0	1.000
Canberra Cannons	1	**1996**	3	2–1	.667
Illawarra Hawks	4	**1993**, **1994**, **2024**, 2025	12	8–4	.667
New Zealand Breakers	3	**2009**, 2016, **2018**	6	4–2	.667
North Melbourne Giants	1	**1997**	2	2–0	1.000
Perth Wildcats	9	1990, **1992**, **1993**, 1995, **2005**, **2006**, 2019, **2021**, **2025**	24	14–10	.583
South Dragons	1	2009	5	2–3	.400
S.E. Melbourne Magic	4	1992, **1993**, 1996, **1997**	11	6–5	.545
S.E. Melbourne Phoenix	1	**2021**	3	2–1	.667
Sydney Kings	7	1989, **1992**, 2003, **2006**, **2008**, **2019**, 2020	22	13–9	.591
Tasmania JackJumpers	2	2022, 2024	8	3–5	.375
Townsville Crocodiles	1	2004	1	0–1	.000
Victoria Titans	3	1999, 2000, **2002**	8	3–5	.375
West Sydney Razorbacks	1	2002	3	1–2	.333
Totals	50		137	74–63	.540

As of the end of the 2025 season

=== New Zealand Breakers ===
Opponent	S	Occurrences	GP	Rec	%
Adelaide 36ers	2	**2009**, **2015**	3	3–0	1.000
Brisbane Bullets	1	2008	1	0–1	.000
Cairns Taipans	3	**2008**, **2011**, **2015**	6	5–1	.833
Illawarra Hawks	1	2024	1	0–1	.000
Melbourne United	3	2009, **2016**, 2018	6	2–4	.333
Perth Wildcats	4	**2011**, **2012**, **2013**, 2016	11	7–4	.636
Sydney Kings	3	**2013**, 2023, **2024**	8	5–3	.625
Townsville Crocodiles	1	**2012**	3	2–1	.667
Tasmania JackJumpers	1	**2023**	3	2–1	.667
Totals			42	26–16	.619

As of the end of the 2024 season

=== Perth Wildcats ===
Opponent	S	Occurrences	GP	Rec	%
Adelaide 36ers	10	**1987**, **1989**, **1991**, **1995**, 1996, 1998, 1999, **2003**, **2014**, 2018	25	13–12	.520
Brisbane Bullets	7	1987, **1988**, **1990**, **1993**, **1997**, **2006**, **2019**	14	10–4	.714
Cairns Taipans	6	2004, 2007, 2015, **2017**, **2020**, 2023	10	4–6	.400
Canberra Cannons	1	**1987**	1	1–0	1.000
Eastside Spectres	1	**1991**	3	2–1	.667
Gold Coast Blaze	2	**2010**, **2012**	5	4–1	.800
Illawarra Hawks	10	**1998**, 2001, **2003**, **2006**, **2010**, **2013**, **2014**, **2016**, **2017**, **2021**	24	19–5	.792
Melbourne United	9	**1990**, 1992, 1993, **1995**, 2005, 2006, **2019**, 2021, 2025	24	10–14	.417
New Zealand Breakers	4	2011, 2012, 2013, **2016**	11	4–7	.364
North Melbourne Giants	5	1988, 1989, **1990**, **1993**, **1995**	15	8–7	.533
S.E. Melbourne Magic	2	1994, 1997	4	0–4	.000
S.E. Melbourne Phoenix	2	**2023**, **2025**	2	2–0	1.000
Sydney Kings	3	2003, 2008, **2020**	8	3–5	.375
Tasmania JackJumpers	1	2024	3	1–2	.333
Townsville Crocodiles	3	**2000**, **2008**, 2009	5	3–2	.600
Victoria Titans	1	**2000**	2	2–0	1.000
West Sydney Razorbacks	2	**2000**, 2002	5	2–3	.400
Totals	69		161	88–73	.547

As of the end of the 2025 season

=== S.E. Melbourne Phoenix ===
Opponent	S	Occurrences	GP	Rec	%
Adelaide 36ers	1	**2025**	1	1–0	1.000
Illawarra Hawks	1	2025	3	1–2	.333
Melbourne United	1	2021	3	1–2	.333
Perth Wildcats	2	2023, 2025	2	0–2	.000
Totals	5		9	3–6	.333

As of the end of the 2025 season

=== Sydney Kings ===
Opponent	S	Occurrences	GP	Rec	%
Adelaide 36ers	1	2025	1	0–1	.000
Brisbane Bullets	6	1986, 1990, **1992**, **2004**, **2005**, 2007	12	7–5	.583
Cairns Taipans	2	**2006**, **2023**	5	4–1	.800
Canberra Cannons	2	1989, 1996	6	2–4	.333
Illawarra Hawks	2	**2004**, **2022**	5	5–0	1.000
Melbourne United	7	**1989**, 1992, **2003**, 2006, 2008, 2019, **2020**	22	9–13	.409
Newcastle Falcons	1	**1983**	1	1–0	1.000
New Zealand Breakers	3	2013, **2023**, 2024	8	3–5	.375
North Melbourne Giants	2	**1983**, 1994	4	2–2	.500
Perth Wildcats	3	**2003**, **2008**, 2020	8	5–3	.625
Tasmania JackJumpers	1	**2022**	3	3–0	1.000
Townsville Crocodiles	3	2001, **2003**, **2007**	7	4–3	.571
West Adelaide Bearcats	1	1983	1	0–1	.000
West Sydney Razorbacks	1	**2004**	5	3–2	.600
Totals	35		88	48–40	.545

As of the end of the 2025 season

=== Tasmania JackJumpers ===
Opponent	S	Occurrences	GP	Rec	%
Cairns Taipans	1	**2023**	1	1–0	1.000
Illawarra Hawks	1	**2024**	1	1–0	1.000
Melbourne United	2	**2022**, **2024**	8	5–3	.625
New Zealand Breakers	1	2023	3	1–2	.333
Perth Wildcats	1	**2024**	3	2–1	.667
Sydney Kings	1	2022	3	0–3	.000
Totals	7		19	10–9	.526

As of the end of the 2024 season

== Finals appearances ==
Team	Appearances	Notes
Perth Wildcats	39	35 straight Finals appearances from 1987 to 2021.
Melbourne United	30	Rebranded as Melbourne United in 2014, and represents the whole of Melbourne.
Adelaide 36ers	27	Formerly the Adelaide City Eagles (1982 only).
Illawarra Hawks	24	Only team to play all seasons since 1979.
Brisbane Bullets	22	Foundation club since 1979.
Sydney Kings	20	Formerly the Sydney Supersonics and the West Sydney Westars.
North Melbourne Giants	15	Last season in 1998. Formed the Victoria Titans in 1998.
Canberra Cannons	11	Last season in 2003. Became the Hunter Pirates in 2003.
New Zealand Breakers	10	Joined the NBL in 2003. First club outside of Australia.
Townsville Crocodiles	10	Competed in the league for 24 seasons. Last season in 2016.
Cairns Taipans	9	Joined the NBL in 1999.
Eastside Spectres	8	Last season in 1991. Formed the South East Melbourne Magic in 1992.
S.E. Melbourne Magic	7	Last season in 1998. Formed the Victoria Titans in 1998.
Newcastle Falcons	6	Competed in the league for 21 seasons. Last season in 1999.
Geelong Supercats	4	Last season in 1996. Now in NBL1 South.
S.E. Melbourne Phoenix	4	Joined the NBL in 2019.
Tasmania JackJumpers	4	Joined the NBL in 2021.
Victoria Titans	4	Became the Victoria Giants in 2002.
West Adelaide Bearcats	4	Last season in 1984. Now in NBL1 Central.
Gold Coast Blaze	3	Last season in 2012.
St. Kilda Saints	3	Last season in 1991. Formed the South East Melbourne Magic in 1992.
West Sydney Razorbacks	3	Became Sydney Spirit in 2008.
Hunter Pirates	2	Last season in 2006. Became the Singapore Slingers in 2006.
South Dragons	2	Left the NBL in 2009.
Sydney SuperSonics	2	Formed the Sydney Kings in 1988.
Launceston Casino City	1	Last season in 1982.
Singapore Slingers	1	Left the NBL in 2008. Joined the ABL in 2009.
West Sydney Westars	1	Formed the Sydney Kings in 1988.

== See also ==
- NBL Championship
- NBL Cup
- WNBL Finals
- Basketball
- Basketball in Australia
- Australia men's national basketball team
- List of NBA playoff series
- List of WNBA playoff series
