= 2014 NBL Finals =

- League: National Basketball League
- Sport: Basketball
- Duration: March 2014–April 2014
- Teams: 4
- TV partner: Network Ten (Australia) One (Australia) Sky Sport (New Zealand) NBL.TV (online) LiveBasketball.TV (online)

NBL Finals
- Champions: Perth Wildcats
- Runners-up: Adelaide 36ers
- Finals MVP: Jermaine Beal

Seasons
- ← 2013 2015 →

The 2014 NBL Finals was the championship series of the 2013–14 NBL season and the conclusion of the season's playoffs. The Perth Wildcats defeated the Adelaide 36ers in three games (2–1) to claim their sixth NBL championship.

== Format ==
The 2013–14 National Basketball League Finals was played in March and April 2014 between the top four teams of the regular season, consisting of two best-of-three semi-final and final series, where the higher seed hosted the first and third games.

== Qualification ==
=== Qualified teams ===
Team	Date of qualification	Round of qualification	Finals appearance	Previous appearance	Previous best performance
Perth Wildcats	8 February 2014	17	28th	2013	Champions (1990, 1991, 1995, 2000, 2010)
Adelaide 36ers	8 March 2014	21	22nd	2009	Champions (1986, 1998, 1999, 2002)
Melbourne Tigers	9 March 2014	21	21st	2009	Champions (1993, 1997, 2006, 2008)
Wollongong Hawks	21 March 2014	23	18th	2013	Champions (2001)

=== Ladder ===
Pos	2013–14 NBL season											
Pos	Team	Pld	W	L	PCT	Last 5	Streak	Home	Away	PF	PA	PP
1	Perth Wildcats	28	21	7	75.00%	4–1	W1	12–2	9–5	2419	2177	111.12%
2	Adelaide 36ers	28	18	10	64.29%	3–2	W1	13–1	5–9	2527	2469	102.35%
3	Melbourne Tigers	28	15	13	53.57%	3–2	L1	7–7	8–6	2299	2292	100.31%
4	Wollongong Hawks	28	13	15	46.43%	3–2	L1	8–6	5–9	2295	2333	98.37%
5	Sydney Kings^{1}	28	12	16	42.86%	1–4	L2	7–7	5–9	2312	2414	95.78%
6	Cairns Taipans^{1}	28	12	16	42.86%	3–2	W1	5–9	7–7	2304	2349	98.08%
7	New Zealand Breakers	28	11	17	39.29%	2–3	L1	8–6	3–11	2474	2493	99.24%
8	Townsville Crocodiles	28	10	18	35.71%	2–3	W1	6–8	4–10	2369	2472	95.83%

Updated to match(es) played on 23 March 2014. Source: NBL.com.au

=== Ladder Progression ===
- Numbers highlighted in green indicate that the team finished the round inside the top four.
- Numbers highlighted in blue indicates the team finished first on the ladder in that round.
- Numbers highlighted in red indicates the team finished last place on the ladder in that round.

2013–14 NBL season
Team	1	2	3	4	5	6	7	8	9	10	11	12	13	14	15	16	17	18	19	20	21	22	23
Adelaide 36ers	5	3	3	2	2	2	2	2	2	2	2	2	2	2	2	2	2	2	2	2	2	2	2
Cairns Taipans	2	2	2	4	6	6	7	7	7	7	5	4	7	5	5	5	5	7	7	7	6	7	5
Melbourne Tigers	6	7	4	3	3	3	3	5	4	3	3	3	3	3	3	3	3	3	3	3	3	3	3
New Zealand Breakers	1	6	8	6	7	7	6	4	6	8	6	7	6	7	6	6	6	5	6	6	7	6	7
Perth Wildcats	4	1	1	1	1	1	1	1	1	1	1	1	1	1	1	1	1	1	1	1	1	1	1
Sydney Kings	3	5	6	5	4	4	4	3	3	4	4	5	4	4	4	4	4	4	4	4	4	5	6
Townsville Crocodiles	7	4	5	7	5	5	5	6	5	5	7	8	8	8	8	8	7	8	8	8	8	8	8
Wollongong Hawks	8	8	7	8	8	8	8	8	8	6	8	6	5	6	7	7	8	6	5	5	5	4	4

=== Seedings ===
1. Perth Wildcats
2. Adelaide 36ers
3. Melbourne Tigers
4. Wollongong Hawks

The NBL tie-breaker system as outlined in the NBL Rules and Regulations states that in the case of an identical win–loss record, the results in games played between the teams will determine order of seeding.

== Bracket ==
Semifinals
1	Perth Wildcats	91	80	X
4	Wollongong Hawks	79	61	X
2	Adelaide 36ers	101	87	102
3	Melbourne Tigers	85	98	63

Grand Final
1	Perth Wildcats	92	84	93
2	Adelaide 36ers	85	89	59

== Semi-finals series ==
=== (1) Perth Wildcats vs (4) Wollongong Hawks ===
28 March	Perth Wildcats	91–79 (Series: Perth leads series, 1–0)	Wollongong Hawks	Perth Arena, Perth
6:30 p.m. WST	Scoring by quarter: 27-26, 22-12, 22-25, 20-16
One	Pts: James Ennis 25; Rebs: Jesse Wagstaff 7 Asts: Jermaine Beal 6	boxscore	Pts: Rotnei Clarke 23; Rebs: Coenraad, Forman 5 each Asts: Rotnei Clarke 4	Attendance: 10,907; Referees: Vaughan Mayberry, Raoul Kirsten, Matt Beattie

30 March	Wollongong Hawks	61–80 (Series: Perth wins series, 2–0)	Perth Wildcats	WIN Entertainment Centre, Wollongong
3:00 p.m. EDT	Scoring by quarter: 16-13, 17-26, 11-26, 17-15
One	Pts: Tim Coenraad 15; Rebs: David Gruber 10; Asts: Martin, Tiggs 3 each	boxscore	Pts: Shawn Redhage 26; Rebs: James Ennis 8 Asts: Jermaine Beal 4	Attendance: 2,721; Referees: Michael Aylen, Scott Beker, Matt Townsend

Regular season series

Perth won 3–1 in the regular season series:

1 November 2013	Perth Wildcats	87–47	Wollongong Hawks	Perth Arena, Perth

17 November 2013	Wollongong Hawks	76–89	Perth Wildcats	WIN Entertainment Centre, Wollongong

4 January 2014	Wollongong Hawks	96–91 (OT)	Perth Wildcats	WIN Entertainment Centre, Wollongong

23 March 2014	Perth Wildcats	86–65	Wollongong Hawks	Perth Arena, Perth

=== (2) Adelaide 36ers vs (3) Melbourne Tigers ===
27 March	Adelaide 36ers	101–85 (Series: Adelaide leads series, 1–0)	Melbourne Tigers	Adelaide Arena, Adelaide
7:00 p.m. CDT	Scoring by quarter: 31-26, 22-20, 24-19, 24-20
One	Pts: Gary Ervin 27; Rebs: Schenscher, Johnson 7 each Asts: Gary Ervin 7	boxscore	Pts: Chris Goulding 20; Rebs: Nate Tomlinson 14; Asts: Nate Tomlison 12	Attendance: 3,865; Referees: Michael Aylen, Brett Hogan, Chris Reid

30 March	Melbourne Tigers	98–87 (Series: Series tied, 1–1)	Adelaide 36ers	Hisense Arena, Melbourne
1:00 p.m. EDT	Scoring by quarter: 21-30, 27-16, 28-19, 22-22
Network Ten	Pts: Chris Goulding 37; Rebs: Lucas Walker 12; Asts: Nate Tomlison 5	boxscore	Pts: Petrie, Teys 17 each Rebs: Daniel Johnson 12; Asts: Adam Gibson 3	Attendance: 4,044; Referees: Vaughan Mayberry, Brad Geirsch, Chris Reid

1 April	Adelaide 36ers	102–63 (Series: Adelaide wins series, 2–1)	Melbourne Tigers	Adelaide Arena, Adelaide
7:00 p.m. CDT	Scoring by quarter: 23-14, 26-13, 30-20, 23-16
One	Pts: Daniel Johnson 23; Rebs: Adam Gibson 8 Asts: Cadee, Carter 4 each	boxscore	Pts: Lucas Walker 11; Rebs: Adam Ballinger 6 Asts: Farrakhan, Worthington 3 each	Attendance: 4,024; Referees: Michael Aylen, Scott Beker, Brett Hogan

Regular season series

Tied 2–2 in the regular season series; 367-356 points differential to Adelaide:

27 October 2013	Melbourne Tigers	93–79	Adelaide 36ers	State Netball and Hockey Centre, Melbourne

8 November 2013	Adelaide 36ers	90–87	Melbourne Tigers	Adelaide Arena, Adelaide

16 February 2014	Melbourne Tigers	82–99	Adelaide 36ers	Hisense Arena, Melbourne

23 March 2014	Adelaide 36ers	99–94	Melbourne Tigers	Adelaide Arena, Adelaide

== Grand Final series ==
=== (1) Perth Wildcats vs (2) Adelaide 36ers ===
7 April	Perth Wildcats	92–85 (Series: Perth leads series, 1–0)	Adelaide 36ers	Perth Arena, Perth
7:30 p.m. WST	Scoring by quarter: 29-24, 22-16, 18-17, 23-28
One	Pts: James Ennis 30; Rebs: James Ennis 10; Asts: Ennis, Martin, Redhage 4 each	boxscore	Pts: Daniel Johnson 18; Rebs: Daniel Johnson 8 Asts: Adam Gibson 9	Attendance: 13,291; Referees: Michael Aylen, Vaughan Mayberry, Chris Reid

11 April	Adelaide 36ers	89–84 (Series: Series tied, 1–1)	Perth Wildcats	Adelaide Arena, Adelaide
7:00 p.m. CST	Scoring by quarter: 29-26, 22-15, 21-22, 17-21
One	Pts: Gary Ervin 23; Rebs: Adam Gibson 9 Asts: Adam Gibson 7	boxscore	Pts: Jermaine Beal 19; Rebs: James Ennis 9 Asts: Damian Martin 4	Attendance: 8,127; Referees: Michael Aylen, Vaughan Mayberry, Chris Reid

13 April	Perth Wildcats	93–59 (Series: Perth wins series, 2–1)	Adelaide 36ers	Perth Arena, Perth
11:00 a.m. WST	Scoring by quarter: 18-15, 29-14, 23-19, 23-11
Network Ten	Pts: Shawn Redhage 16; Rebs: Greg Hire 9 Asts: Greg Hire 5	boxscore	Pts: Anthony Petrie 20; Rebs: Luke Schenscher 7 Asts: Jason Cadee 3	Attendance: 13,498; Referees: Michael Aylen, Vaughan Mayberry, Chris Reid

Regular season series

Tied 2–2 in the regular season series; 334-333 points differential to Adelaide:

11 October 2013	Perth Wildcats	83–80	Adelaide 36ers	Perth Arena, Perth

22 November 2013	Adelaide 36ers	91–86	Perth Wildcats	Adelaide Arena, Adelaide

14 February 2014	Perth Wildcats	85–61	Adelaide 36ers	Perth Arena, Perth

14 March 2014	Adelaide 36ers	102–79	Perth Wildcats	Adelaide Arena, Adelaide

== See also ==
- 2013–14 NBL season
- 2013–14 Adelaide 36ers season
