= 2016 NBL Finals =

Tournament details
- Countries: Australia; New Zealand
- Dates: 16 February – 6 March 2016
- Season: 2015–16
- Teams: 4

Final positions
- Champions: Perth Wildcats (7th title)
- Runner-up: New Zealand Breakers
- Semifinalists: Melbourne United; Illawarra Hawks

The 2016 NBL Finals was the championship series of the 2015–16 NBL season and the conclusion of the season's playoffs. The Perth Wildcats defeated the New Zealand Breakers in three games (2–1) to claim their seventh NBL championship.

== Format ==
The 2015–16 National Basketball League Finals were played in February and March 2016 between the top four teams of the regular season, consisting of two best-of-three semi-final and final series, where the higher seed hosts the first and third games.

== Qualification ==
=== Qualified teams ===
Team	Date of qualification	Round of qualification	Finals appearance	Previous appearance	Previous best performance
Melbourne United	29 January 2016	17	22nd	2014	Champions (1993, 1997, 2006, 2008)
Perth Wildcats	5 February 2016	18	30th	2015	Champions (1990, 1991, 1995, 2000, 2010, 2014)
Illawarra Hawks	6 February 2016	18	19th	2014	Champions (2001)
New Zealand Breakers	12 February 2016	19	7th	2015	Champions (2011, 2012, 2013, 2015)

=== Ladder ===
Pos	2015–16 NBL season											
Pos	Team	Pld	W	L	PCT	Last 5	Streak	Home	Away	PF	PA	PP
1	Melbourne United^{1}	28	18	10	64.29%	2–3	L2	11–3	7–7	2384	2342	101.79%
2	Perth Wildcats^{1}	28	18	10	64.29%	3–2	W1	12–2	6–8	2391	2266	105.52%
3	Illawarra Hawks	28	17	11	60.71%	3–2	W2	11–3	6–8	2637	2486	106.07%
4	New Zealand Breakers	28	16	12	57.14%	5–0	W5	11–3	5–9	2357	2282	103.29%
5	Adelaide 36ers	28	14	14	50.00%	1–4	L4	10–4	4–10	2495	2500	99.80%
6	Cairns Taipans	28	12	16	42.86%	2–3	L2	11–3	1–13	2238	2354	95.07%
7	Townsville Crocodiles	28	11	17	39.29%	3–2	W2	8–6	3–11	2271	2390	95.02%
8	Sydney Kings	28	6	22	21.43%	1–4	L1	5–9	1–13	2416	2569	94.04%

Updated to match(es) played on 14 February 2016. Source: NBL.com.au

=== Ladder Progression ===
- Numbers highlighted in green indicate that the team finished the round inside the top four.
- Numbers highlighted in blue indicates the team finished first on the ladder in that round.
- Numbers highlighted in red indicates the team finished last place on the ladder in that round.

2015–16 NBL season
Team	1	2	3	4	5	6	7	8	9	10	11	12	13	14	15	16	17	18	19
Adelaide 36ers	4	6	3	3	4	4	4	4	5	5	5	5	5	5	4	4	4	5	5
Cairns Taipans	6	3	6	6	6	6	6	6	6	6	6	6	6	6	6	6	6	6	6
Illawarra Hawks	7	4	4	5	5	5	5	5	4	4	4	4	3	3	2	3	3	3	3
Melbourne United	3	1	1	1	1	1	1	1	1	2	2	3	2	1	1	1	1	1	1
New Zealand Breakers	5	8	5	4	3	3	3	3	3	3	3	2	4	4	5	5	5	4	4
Perth Wildcats	2	2	2	2	2	2	2	2	2	1	1	1	1	2	3	2	2	2	2
Sydney Kings	1	5	8	7	8	7	8	8	8	8	8	8	8	8	8	8	8	8	8
Townsville Crocodiles	8	7	7	8	7	8	7	7	7	7	7	7	7	7	7	7	7	7	7

=== Seedings ===
1. Melbourne United
2. Perth Wildcats
3. Illawarra Hawks
4. New Zealand Breakers

The NBL tie-breaker system as outlined in the NBL Rules and Regulations states that in the case of an identical win–loss record, the results in games played between the teams will determine order of seeding.

== Bracket ==
Semifinals
1	Melbourne United	82	78	X
4	New Zealand Breakers	91	91	X
2	Perth Wildcats	80	87	89
3	Illawarra Hawks	68	104	74

Grand Final
2	Perth Wildcats	82	68	75
4	New Zealand Breakers	76	72	52

== Semi-finals series ==
=== (1) Melbourne United vs (4) New Zealand Breakers ===
18 February 2016	Melbourne United	82–91 (Series: New Zealand leads series, 1–0)	New Zealand Breakers	Hisense Arena, Melbourne
7:30pm EDT	Scoring by quarter: 16-27, 25-11, 17-24, 24-29
Fox Sports	Pts: Hakim Warrick 24; Rebs: Hakim Warrick 13; Asts: Stephen Holt 4	boxscore report	Pts: Cedric Jackson 20; Rebs: Mika Vukona 13; Asts: Mika Vukona 5	Attendance: 5,532; Referees: Michael Aylen, Brad Giersch, Matt Townsend

20 February 2016	New Zealand Breakers	91–78 (Series: New Zealand win series, 2–0)	Melbourne United	Vector Arena, Auckland
7:30pm NZDT	Scoring by quarter: 23-17, 18-29, 17-11, 33-21
Sky Sport	Pts: Thomas Abercrombie 23; Rebs: Mika Vukona 9 Asts: Cedric Jackson 5	boxscore report	Pts: Chris Goulding 23; Rebs: Todd Blanchfield 8 Asts: Nate Tomlinson 5	Attendance: TBA; Referees: Michael Aylen, Brad Giersch, Matt Townsend

Regular season series

New Zealand won 3–1 in the regular season series:

8 November 2015	Melbourne United	87–86	New Zealand Breakers	Hisense Arena, Melbourne

22 November 2015	New Zealand Breakers	80–69	Melbourne United	Vector Arena, Auckland

12 February 2016	New Zealand Breakers	100–63	Melbourne United	North Shore Events Centre, Auckland

14 February 2016	Melbourne United	68–70	New Zealand Breakers	Hisense Arena, Melbourne

=== (2) Perth Wildcats vs (3) Illawarra Hawks ===
19 February 2016	Perth Wildcats	80–68 (Series: Perth leads series, 1-0)	Illawarra Hawks	Perth Arena, Perth
6:30pm WST	Scoring by quarter: 15-18, 24-18, 21-15, 20-17
Fox Sports	Pts: Casey Prather 19; Rebs: Tom Jervis 8 Asts: Damian Martin 6	boxscore report	Pts: Tim Coenraad 23; Rebs: Andrew Ogilvy 11; Asts: Rhys Martin 4	Attendance: 8,700; Referees: Vaughan Mayberry, Matt Beattie, Chris Reid

21 February 2016	Illawarra Hawks	104–87 (Series: Series tied, 1–1)	Perth Wildcats	WIN Entertainment Centre, Wollongong
3:00pm EDT	Scoring by quarter: 24-26, 28-24, 27-16, 21-16
Fox Sports	Pts: Oscar Forman 21; Rebs: Andrew Ogilvy 7 Asts: Kirk Penney 7	boxscore report	Pts: Casey Prather 21; Rebs: Nathan Jawai 8 Asts: Damian Martin 7	Attendance: TBA; Referees: Vaughan Mayberry, Matt Beattie, Chris Reid

26 February 2016	Perth Wildcats	89–74 (Series: Perth wins series, 2-1)	Illawarra Hawks	Perth Arena, Perth
6:30pm WST	Scoring by quarter: 22-20, 27-22, 21-14, 19-18
Fox Sports	Pts: Jermaine Beal 17; Rebs: Matthew Knight 9 Asts: Casey Prather 4	boxscore report	Pts: Kirk Penney 18; Rebs: Andrew Ogilvy 11; Asts: Andrew Ogilvy 5	Attendance: TBA; Referees: Vaughan Mayberry, Matt Beattie, Chris Reid

Regular season series

Perth won 4-0 in the regular season series:

25 October 2015	Illawarra Hawks	99–106	Perth Wildcats	WIN Entertainment Centre, Wollongong

31 October 2015	Perth Wildcats	91–62	Illawarra Hawks	Perth Arena, Perth

11 November 2015	Illawarra Hawks	96–99	Perth Wildcats	WIN Entertainment Centre, Wollongong

21 January 2016	Perth Wildcats	95–72	Illawarra Hawks	Perth Arena, Perth

== Grand Final series ==
=== (2) Perth Wildcats vs (4) New Zealand Breakers ===
2 March 2016	Perth Wildcats	82–76 (Series: Perth leads series, 1-0)	New Zealand Breakers	Perth Arena, Perth
6:30pm WST	Scoring by quarter: 24-14, 21-24, 18-23, 19-15
Fox Sports	Pts: Nathan Jawai 15; Rebs: Damian Martin 10; Asts: Damian Martin 5	boxscore report	Pts: Corey Webster 19; Rebs: Charles Jackson 10; Asts: Cedric Jackson 2	Attendance: TBA; Referees: Vaughan Mayberry, Michael Aylen, Matt Beattie

4 March 2016	New Zealand Breakers	72–68 (Series: Series tied, 1-1)	Perth Wildcats	North Shore Events Centre, Auckland
7:30pm NZDT	Scoring by quarter: 16-17, 21-14, 19-19, 16-18
Sky Sport	Pts: Cedric Jackson 13; Rebs: Cedric Jackson 9 Asts: Cedric Jackson 8	boxscore report	Pts: Jermaine Beal 20; Rebs: Matthew Knight 6 Asts: Jermaine Beal 4	Attendance: TBA; Referees: Vaughan Mayberry, Michael Aylen, Chris Reid

6 March 2016	Perth Wildcats	75–52 (Series: Perth wins series, 2–1)	New Zealand Breakers	Perth Arena, Perth
2:30pm WST	Scoring by quarter: 22-18, 20-12, 15-8, 18-14
Fox Sports	Pts: Casey Prather 19; Rebs: Matthew Knight 11; Asts: Jesse Wagstaff 5	boxscore report	Pts: Thomas Abercrombie 21; Rebs: Charles Jackson 12; Asts: Corey Webster 4	Attendance: 13,090; Referees: Vaughan Mayberry, Michael Aylen, Brad Giersch

Regular season series

Tied 2–2 in the regular season series; 347-327 points differential to New Zealand:

16 October 2015	Perth Wildcats	83–80	New Zealand Breakers	Perth Arena, Perth

13 November 2015	New Zealand Breakers	88–80	Perth Wildcats	Vector Arena, Auckland

27 November 2015	Perth Wildcats	86–80	New Zealand Breakers	Perth Arena, Perth

2 December 2015	New Zealand Breakers	99–78	Perth Wildcats	North Shore Events Centre, Auckland

== See also ==
- 2015–16 NBL season
