= 2017 NBL Finals =

Tournament details
- Country: Australia
- Dates: 16 February – 5 March 2017
- Season: 2016–17
- Teams: 4

Final positions
- Champions: Perth Wildcats (8th title)
- Runner-up: Illawarra Hawks
- Semifinalists: Adelaide 36ers; Cairns Taipans

The 2017 NBL Finals was the championship series of the 2016–17 NBL season and the conclusion of the season. Perth Wildcats defeated Illawarra Hawks in three games (3-0) to claim their eighth NBL championship.

== Format ==
The 2016–17 National Basketball League Finals were played in February and March 2017 between the top four teams of the regular season, consisting of two best-of-three semi-final and one best-of-five final series, where the higher seed hosted the first, third and fifth games.

== Qualification ==
=== Qualified teams ===
Team	Date of qualification	Round of qualification	Finals appearance	Previous appearance	Previous best performance
Adelaide 36ers	21 January 2017	16	24th	2015	Champions (1986, 1998, 1999, 2002)
Illawarra Hawks	11 February 2017	19	20th	2016	Champions (2001)
Cairns Taipans	11 February 2017	19	6th	2015	Runners-up (2011, 2015)
Perth Wildcats	12 February 2017	19	31st	2016	Champions (1990, 1991, 1995, 2000, 2010, 2014, 2016)

=== Ladder ===
Pos	2016–17 NBL season											
Pos	Team	Pld	W	L	PCT	Last 5	Streak	Home	Away	PF	PA	PP
1	Adelaide 36ers	28	17	11	60.71%	1–4	L4	9–5	8–6	2582	2505	103.07%
2	Cairns Taipans^{1}	28	15	13	53.57%	4–1	W3	10–4	5–9	2305	2301	100.17%
3	Perth Wildcats^{1}	28	15	13	53.57%	4–1	W2	10–4	5–9	2294	2257	101.64%
4	Illawarra Hawks^{1}	28	15	13	53.57%	3–2	W1	9–5	6–8	2486	2444	101.72%
5	New Zealand Breakers	28	14	14	50.00%	3–2	W2	9–5	5–9	2353	2387	98.58%
6	Melbourne United^{2}	28	13	15	46.43%	2–3	L2	9–5	4–10	2351	2337	100.60%
7	Sydney Kings^{2}	28	13	15	46.43%	2–3	L2	7–7	6–8	2295	2311	99.31%
8	Brisbane Bullets	28	10	18	35.71%	1–4	L4	6–8	4–10	2268	2392	94.82%

Updated to match(es) played on 12 February 2017. Source: NBL.com.au

=== Ladder progression ===
- Numbers highlighted in green indicate that the team finished the round inside the top four.
- Numbers highlighted in blue indicates the team finished first on the ladder in that round.
- Numbers highlighted in red indicates the team finished last place on the ladder in that round.

2016–17 NBL season
Team	1	2	3	4	5	6	7	8	9	10	11	12	13	14	15	16	17	18	19
Adelaide 36ers	5	6	4	4	6	7	8	7	5	2	1	1	1	1	1	1	1	1	1
Brisbane Bullets	2	2	3	3	5	4	2	3	2	6	4	7	5	6	8	8	8	8	8
Cairns Taipans	8	8	8	7	4	6	6	6	4	8	6	6	8	7	7	7	4	5	2
Illawarra Hawks	1	7	7	8	7	5	5	4	3	3	2	2	3	3	2	2	2	2	4
Melbourne United	7	4	5	5	8	8	7	8	6	5	8	4	2	4	3	4	7	3	6
New Zealand Breakers	3	5	6	6	3	3	4	5	8	7	5	5	7	8	6	3	6	7	5
Perth Wildcats	4	3	2	2	2	2	3	2	7	4	7	8	6	2	5	5	5	4	3
Sydney Kings	6	1	1	1	1	1	1	1	1	1	3	3	4	5	4	6	3	6	7

=== Seedings ===
1. Adelaide 36ers
2. Cairns Taipans
3. Perth Wildcats
4. Illawarra Hawks

The NBL tie-breaker system as outlined in the NBL Rules and Regulations states that in the case of an identical win–loss record, the results in games played between the teams will determine order of seeding.

== Bracket ==
Semifinals
1	Adelaide 36ers	93	94	98
4	Illawarra Hawks	78	100	106
2	Cairns Taipans	69	66	X
3	Perth Wildcats	91	74	X

Grand Final
3	Perth Wildcats	89	89	95	X	X
4	Illawarra Hawks	77	77	86	X	X

== Semi-finals series ==
=== (1) Adelaide 36ers vs (4) Illawarra Hawks ===
16 February 2017	Adelaide 36ers	93–78 (Series: Adelaide leads series, 1–0)	Illawarra Hawks	Titanium Security Arena, Adelaide
7:00pm CDT	Scoring by quarter: 24-27, 28-15, 21-23, 20-13
Fox Sports	Pts: Jerome Randle 26; Rebs: Matt Hodgson 11; Asts: Jerome Randle 4	boxscore report	Pts: Tim Coenraad 26; Rebs: Andrew Ogilvy 9 Asts: Nick Kay 4	Attendance: 5,056; Referees: Michael Aylen, Matt Townsend, Matt Beattie

19 February 2017	Illawarra Hawks	100–94 (Series: Series tied, 1–1)	Adelaide 36ers	WIN Entertainment Centre, Wollongong
3:00pm EDT	Scoring by quarter: 28-22, 26-27, 25-29, 21-16
Fox Sports	Pts: Mitch Norton 17; Rebs: Andrew Ogilvy 11; Asts: Nick Kay 5	boxscore report	Pts: Jerome Randle 20; Rebs: Matt Hodgson 8 Asts: Jerome Randle 7	Attendance: 3,500; Referees: Michael Aylen, Vaughan Mayberry, Matt Beattie

23 February 2017	Adelaide 36ers	98–106 (Series: Illawarra wins series, 2–1)	Illawarra Hawks	Titanium Security Arena, Adelaide
7:00pm CDT	Scoring by quarter: 18-27, 24-29, 22-26, 34-24
Fox Sports	Pts: Jerome Randle 26; Rebs: Brendan Teys 8 Asts: Jerome Randle 6	boxscore report	Pts: Rotnei Clarke 20; Rebs: Oscar Forman 6 Asts: Rhys Martin 4	Attendance: TBA; Referees: Michael Aylen, Vaughan Mayberry, Chris Reid

Regular season series

Illawarra won 3–1 in the regular season series:

7 October 2016	Illawarra Hawks	122–88	Adelaide 36ers	WIN Entertainment Centre, Wollongong

12 November 2016	Adelaide 36ers	74–85	Illawarra Hawks	Titanium Security Arena, Adelaide

5 January 2017	Adelaide 36ers	117–85	Illawarra Hawks	Titanium Security Arena, Adelaide

28 January 2017	Illawarra Hawks	95–92	Adelaide 36ers	WIN Entertainment Centre, Wollongong

=== (2) Cairns Taipans vs (3) Perth Wildcats ===
17 February 2017	Cairns Taipans	69–91 (Series: Perth leads series, 1–0)	Perth Wildcats	Cairns Convention Centre, Cairns
6:30pm EST	Scoring by quarter: 21-31, 16-17, 20-22, 12-21
Fox Sports	Pts: Travis Trice 15; Rebs: Mitch McCarron 7 Asts: Cameron Gliddon 5	boxscore report	Pts: Bryce Cotton 34; Rebs: Matthew Knight 6 Asts: Bryce Cotton 5	Attendance: 5,200; Referees: Vaughan Mayberry, Chris Reid, Brett Hogan

20 February 2017	Perth Wildcats	74–66 (Series: Perth wins series, 2–0)	Cairns Taipans	Perth Arena, Perth
6:30pm WST	Scoring by quarter: 16-8, 21-14, 15-22, 22-22
Fox Sports	Pts: Casey Prather 24; Rebs: Casey Prather 10; Asts: Bryce Cotton 4	boxscore report	Pts: Travis Trice 22; Rebs: Cameron Gliddon 8 Asts: Travis Trice 5	Attendance: 10,993; Referees: Michael Aylen, Vaughan Mayberry, Chris Reid

Regular season series

Tied 2–2 in the regular season series; 323-317 points differential to Perth:

8 October 2016	Perth Wildcats	84–74 (OT)	Cairns Taipans	Perth Arena, Perth

16 January 2017	Cairns Taipans	80–78	Perth Wildcats	Cairns Convention Centre, Cairns

20 January 2017	Perth Wildcats	84–78 (OT)	Cairns Taipans	Perth Arena, Perth

5 February 2017	Cairns Taipans	85–77	Perth Wildcats	Cairns Convention Centre, Cairns

== Grand Final series ==
=== (3) Perth Wildcats vs (4) Illawarra Hawks ===
26 February 2017	Perth Wildcats	89–77 (Series: Perth leads series, 1–0)	Illawarra Hawks	Perth Arena, Perth
4:00pm WST	Scoring by quarter: 21-26, 21-16, 26-20, 21-15
Fox Sports	Pts: Casey Prather 22; Rebs: Matthew Knight 11; Asts: Martin, Prather 5	boxscore report	Pts: Cody Ellis 12; Rebs: Andrew Ogilvy 6 Asts: Rotnei Clarke 6	Attendance: 10,828; Referees: Michael Aylen, Vaughan Mayberry, Matt Beattie

1 March 2017	Illawarra Hawks	77–89 (Series: Perth leads series, 2–0)	Perth Wildcats	WIN Entertainment Centre, Wollongong
7:30pm EDT	Scoring by quarter: 24-18, 21-22, 14-23, 18-26
Fox Sports	Pts: Clarke, Ogilvy 21; Rebs: Andrew Ogilvy 10; Asts: Nick Kay 5	boxscore report	Pts: Bryce Cotton 20; Rebs: Angus Brandt 11; Asts: Martin, Prather 6	Attendance: TBA; Referees: Michael Aylen, Vaughan Mayberry, Chris Reid

5 March 2017	Perth Wildcats	95–86 (Series: Perth wins series, 3-0)	Illawarra Hawks	Perth Arena, Perth
12:00pm WST	Scoring by quarter: 26-17, 20-24, 25-22, 24-23
Fox Sports	Pts: Bryce Cotton 45; Rebs: Brandt, McKay 7 Asts: Brandt, Prather 4		Pts: Rotnei Clarke 30; Rebs: Andrew Ogilvy 7 Asts: Kay, Norton 3	Attendance: 13,611; Referees: Michael Aylen, Vaughan Mayberry, Chris Reid

Regular season series

Tied 2–2 in the regular season series; 336-330 points differential to Perth:

21 October 2016	Perth Wildcats	80–73	Illawarra Hawks	Perth Arena, Perth

28 October 2016	Illawarra Hawks	81–76	Perth Wildcats	WIN Entertainment Centre, Wollongong

27 November 2016	Perth Wildcats	85–89	Illawarra Hawks	Perth Arena, Perth

31 December 2016	Illawarra Hawks	87–95	Perth Wildcats	WIN Entertainment Centre, Wollongong

== See also ==
- 2016–17 NBL season
