= 1990 NBL Finals =

- League: National Basketball League
- Sport: Basketball
- Duration: 26 September - 28 October 1990
- Number of teams: 6
- TV partner: Seven Network

NBL Finals
- Champions: Perth Wildcats
- Runners-up: Brisbane Bullets
- Finals MVP: Ricky Grace

Seasons
- ← 1989 1991 →

The 1990 NBL Finals was the championship series of the 1990 season of Australia's National Basketball League (NBL) and the conclusion of the season's playoffs. The Perth Wildcats defeated the Brisbane Bullets in three games (2-1) for their first NBL championship.

== Format ==
The 1990 National Basketball League Finals started on 26 September and concluded on 28 October. The playoffs consisted of two best of three Elimination Finals, two best of three Semifinals and the best of three game Grand Final series. As the two top teams at the end of the regular season, the North Melbourne Giants and Eastside Spectres both qualified for home court advantage during the Semifinals.

== Qualification ==
=== Qualified teams ===
Team	Finals appearance	Previous appearance	Previous best performance
North Melbourne Giants	3rd	1989	Champions (1989)
Eastside Spectres	6th	1985	Runner up (1981)
Brisbane Bullets	8th	1988	Champions (1985, 1987)
Perth Wildcats	4th	1989	Runner up (1987)
Melbourne Tigers	2nd	1989	5th in 1989
Sydney Kings	2nd	1989	4th in 1989

=== Ladder ===
Pos	1990 NBL season											
Pos	Team	Pld	W	L	PCT	Last 5	Streak	Home	Away	PF	PA	PP
1	North Melbourne Giants	26	20	6	76.92%	3–2	W3	10–3	10–3	3111	2889	107.68%
2	Eastside Spectres^{1}	26	18	8	69.23%	3–2	W1	10–3	8–5	3028	2858	105.95%
3	Brisbane Bullets^{1}	26	18	8	69.23%	3–2	W1	9–4	9–4	3053	2902	105.20%
4	Melbourne Tigers^{2}	26	17	9	65.38%	4–1	L1	11–2	6–7	3226	3018	106.89%
5	Perth Wildcats^{2}	26	17	9	65.38%	3–2	W2	11–2	6–7	2926	2791	104.84%
6	Sydney Kings^{3}	26	16	10	61.54%	3–2	W2	9–4	7–6	2819	2710	104.02%
7	Canberra Cannons^{3}	26	16	10	61.54%	4–1	L1	10–3	6–7	2918	2843	102.64%
8	Illawarra Hawks	26	13	13	50.00%	1–4	L2	9–4	4–9	3056	3094	98.77%
9	Adelaide 36ers	26	12	14	46.15%	3–2	L1	9–4	3–10	3042	2997	101.50%
10	Geelong Supercats	26	11	15	42.31%	3–2	W1	8–5	3–10	3002	2997	100.17%
11	Gold Coast Cougars	26	9	17	34.62%	1–4	L3	6–7	3–10	2880	2978	96.71%
12	Hobart Tassie Devils	26	8	18	30.77%	1–4	L1	5–8	3–10	2926	3149	92.92%
13	Newcastle Falcons	26	4	22	15.38%	3–2	W1	4–9	0–13	2796	3135	89.19%
14	Westside Saints	26	3	23	11.54%	0–5	L7	2–11	1–12	2713	3135	86.54%

Updated to match(es) played on 22 September 1990. Source: NBL.com.au

The NBL tie-breaker system as outlined in the NBL Rules and Regulations states that in the case of an identical win–loss record, the results in games played between the teams will determine order of seeding.

^{1}Head-to-Head between Eastside Spectres and Brisbane Bullets (1-1). Eastside Spectres won For and Against (+7).

^{2}Head-to-Head between Melbourne Tigers and Perth Wildcats (1-1). Melbourne Tigers won For and Against (+11).

^{3}Sydney Kings won Head-to-Head (2-0).

== Playoff bracket ==
Elimination Finals
4	Melbourne Tigers	100	113	X
5	Perth Wildcats	122	123	X
3	Brisbane Bullets	87	124	107
6	Sydney Kings	98	96	104

Semifinals
1	North Melbourne Giants	111	131	110
5	Perth Wildcats	121	110	112
2	Eastside Spectres	111	119	X
3	Brisbane Bullets	121	120	X

Grand Final
3	Brisbane Bullets	106	106	86
5	Perth Wildcats	112	90	109

== Elimination Finals ==
=== (4) Perth Wildcats vs (5) Melbourne Tigers ===
==== Game 1 ====
Seven Network

26 September

boxscore

Perth Wildcats 122, Melbourne Tigers 100
Scoring by quarter: 26-24, 29-29, 28-22, 39-25
Pts: Ricky Grace 30; Rebs: Kendal Pinder 11; Asts: Ricky Grace 7	Pts: Dave Colbert 52; Rebs: Dave Colbert 9 Asts: Nigel Purchase 4
Perth lead the series 1-0

Perth Entertainment Centre
Attendance: 8,200
Referees: Bill Mildenhall, Geoff Weeks

==== Game 2 ====
Seven Network

28 September

boxscore

Melbourne Tigers 113, Perth Wildcats 123
Scoring by quarter: 24-21, 32-32, 28-31, 29-39
Pts: Dave Colbert 42; Rebs: Colbert, Simmons 9 each Asts: Nigel Purchase 7	Pts: Kendal Pinder 29; Rebs: James Crawford 9 Asts: Mike Ellis 10
Perth win the series 2-0

The Glass House, Melbourne
Attendance: 7,200
Referees: Bill Mildenhall, Geoff Weeks

=== (3) Brisbane Bullets vs (6) Sydney Kings ===
==== Game 1 ====
Seven Network

26 September

boxscore

Sydney Kings 98, Brisbane Bullets 87
Scoring by quarter: 25-19, 24-24, 21-26, 28-18
Pts: Damian Keogh 26; Rebs: Mark Ridlen 13; Asts: Damian Keogh 5	Pts: Andre Moore 28; Rebs: Leroy Loggins 11; Asts: Derek Rucker 6
Sydney lead the series 1-0

State Sports Centre, Sydney
Attendance: 5,006
Referees: Eddie Crouch, Ray Hunt

==== Game 2 ====
Seven Network

28 September

boxscore

Brisbane Bullets 124, Sydney Kings 96
Scoring by quarter: 30-30, 28-20, 38-21, 28-25
Pts: Derek Rucker 37; Rebs: Loggins, Moore 10 each Asts: Derek Rucker 5	Pts: Steve Carfino 30; Rebs: Ridlen, Svaldenis 6 each Asts: Carfino, Robilliard, Dalton 5 each
Series tied at 1-1

Brisbane Entertainment Centre
Referees: Eddie Crouch, Ray Hunt

==== Game 3 ====
Seven Network

30 September

boxscore

Brisbane Bullets 107, Sydney Kings 104
Scoring by quarter: 33-25, 28-23, 25-26, 21-30
Pts: Derek Rucker 46; Rebs: Andre Moore 9 Asts: Rucker, Fox 6 each	Pts: Mark Ridlen 35; Rebs: Mark Dalton 9 Asts: Steve Carfino 4
Brisbane wins the series 2-1

Brisbane Entertainment Centre
Referees: Eddie Crouch, Ray Hunt

== Semifinals ==
=== (2) Eastside Spectres vs (3) Brisbane Bullets ===
==== Game 1 ====
Seven Network

6 October

boxscore

Brisbane Bullets 121, Eastside Spectres 111
Scoring by quarter: 38-30, 23-22, 26-26, 34-33
Pts: Andre Moore 36; Rebs: Andre Moore 13; Asts: Greg Fox 9	Pts: Darren Perry 22; Rebs: Dean Uthoff 12; Asts: Darren Perry 12
Brisbane lead the series 1-0

Brisbane Entertainment Centre
Referees: Bill Mildenhall, Ray Hunt

==== Game 2 ====
Seven Network

13 October

boxscore

Eastside Spectres 119, Brisbane Bullets 120
Scoring by quarter: 26-32, 31-28, 27-35, 29-18
Pts: Bruce Bolden 35; Rebs: Dean Uthoff 12; Asts: Bruce Bolden 8	Pts: Andre Moore 35; Rebs: Andre Moore 10; Asts: Greg Fox 10
Brisbane wins the series 2-0

The Glass House, Melbourne
Attendance: 7,200
Referees: Bill Mildenhall, Ray Hunt

=== (1) North Melbourne Giants vs (4) Perth Wildcats ===
==== Game 1 ====
Seven Network

6 October

boxscore

Perth Wildcats 121, North Melbourne Giants 111
Scoring by quarter: 29-28, 28-30, 35-29, 29-24
Pts: Ricky Grace 39; Rebs: Kendal Pinder 14; Asts: Mike Ellis 12	Pts: Scott Fisher 27; Rebs: Scott Fisher 12; Asts: Joe Hillman 7
Perth lead the series 1-0

Perth Entertainment Centre
Attendance: 8,200
Referees: Eddie Crouch, Geoff Weeks

==== Game 2 ====
Seven Network

12 October

boxscore

North Melbourne Giants 131, Perth Wildcats 110
Scoring by quarter: 31-23, 31-37, 35-23, 34-27
Pts: Scott Fisher 35; Rebs: Scott Fisher 14; Asts: Joe Hillman 4	Pts: Ricky Grace 25; Rebs: James Crawford 15; Asts: Mike Ellis 7
Series tied at 1-1

The Glass House, Melbourne
Attendance: 7,200
Referees: Eddie Crouch, Geoff Weeks

==== Game 3 ====
Seven Network

14 October

boxscore

North Melbourne Giants 110, Perth Wildcats 112 (OT)
Scoring by quarter: 20-25, 34-23, 26-30, 20-22, Overtime: 10-12
Pts: Scott Fisher 32; Rebs: Scott Fisher 21; Asts: Hillman, Fisher 4 each	Pts: Kendal Pinder 28; Rebs: Kendal Pinder 13; Asts: Ricky Grace 11
Perth win the series 2-1

The Glass House, Melbourne
Attendance: 7,200
Referees: Eddie Crouch, Geoff Weeks

== Grand Final series ==
The 1990 Grand Final series between the Brisbane Bullets and Perth Wildcats saw a then record aggregate attendance for an NBL Grand Final series with 34,580 attending the 3 games. Game 2 at the Brisbane Entertainment Centre attracted a then record Australian indoor sporting attendance (and NBL record crowd) of 13,221.

=== (3) Brisbane Bullets vs (4) Perth Wildcats ===
==== Game 1 ====
Seven Network

19 October

boxscore

Perth Wildcats 112, Brisbane Bullets 106
Scoring by quarter: 32-20, 20-32, 32-23, 28-31
Pts: Ricky Grace 32; Rebs: James Crawford 14; Asts: Mike Ellis 9	Pts: Derek Rucker 27; Rebs: Andre Moore 14; Asts: Derek Rucker 10
Perth leads series 1-0

Perth Entertainment Centre
Attendance: 8,200
Referees: Bill Mildenhall, Eddie Crouch

==== Game 2 ====
Seven Network

26 October

boxscore

Brisbane Bullets 106, Perth Wildcats 90
Scoring by quarter: 28-20, 23-17, 34-27, 21-26
Pts: Derek Rucker 27; Rebs: Andre Moore 13; Asts: Derek Rucker 7	Pts: James Crawford 22; Rebs: James Crawford 14; Asts: Ricky Grace 7
Series tied at 1-1

Brisbane Entertainment Centre
Attendance: 13,221
Referees: Bill Mildenhall, Eddie Crouch

==== Game 3 ====
Seven Network

28 October

boxscore

Brisbane Bullets 86, Perth Wildcats 109
Scoring by quarter: 22-27, 25-31, 13-22, 26-29
Pts: Derek Rucker 21; Rebs: Andre Moore 9 Asts: Derek Rucker 5	Pts: Ricky Grace 25; Rebs: Kendal Pinder 8 Asts: Grace, Ellis 7 each
Perth wins series and NBL Championship 2–1; Grand Final MVP: Ricky Grace (Perth)

Brisbane Entertainment Centre
Attendance: 13,159
Referees: Eddie Crouch, Bill Mildenhall

== See also ==
- 1990 NBL season
