= 2019 NBL Finals =

Tournament details
- Country: Australia
- Dates: 28 February – 17 March
- Season: 2018–19
- Teams: 4
- Defending champions: Melbourne United

Final positions
- Champions: Perth Wildcats (9th title)
- Runners-up: Melbourne United
- Semifinalists: Sydney Kings; Brisbane Bullets

Tournament statistics
- Matches played: 8
- Attendance: 84,212 (10,527 per match)
- Scoring leader(s): Terrico White

Awards
- MVP: Terrico White (Perth)

The 2019 NBL Finals were the championship series of the 2018–19 NBL season and the conclusion of the season. The semi-finals started on 28 February and ended 3 March 2019, making way for the Grand Final series to commence on 8 March and end on 17 March 2018. The Perth Wildcats were 3-1 victors over Melbourne United in the best of 5 series, winning their ninth NBL championship title.

== Format ==
The finals were played in February and March 2020 between the top four teams of the regular season, consisting of two best-of-three semi-final and one best-of-five final series, where the higher seed hosts the first, third and fifth games.

== Qualification ==
=== Qualified teams ===
Team	Date of qualification	Round of qualification	Finals appearance	Previous appearance	Previous best performance	Ref.
Perth Wildcats	1 February 2019	16	33rd	2018	Champions (1990, 1991, 1995, 2000, 2010, 2014, 2016, 2017)	
Melbourne United	3 February 2020	16	24th	2018	Champions (1993, 1997, 2006, 2008, 2018)	
Sydney Kings	3 February 2019	16	14th	2013	Champions (2003, 2004, 2005)	
Brisbane Bullets	17 February 2019	18	21st	2008	Champions (1985, 1987, 2007)	

=== Ladder ===
Pos	2018–19 NBL season											
Pos	Team	Pld	W	L	PCT	Last 5	Streak	Home	Away	PF	PA	PP
1	Perth Wildcats^{1}	28	18	10	64.29%	4–1	L1	12–2	6–8	2499	2355	106.11%
2	Melbourne United^{1}	28	18	10	64.29%	3–2	W1	10–4	8–6	2586	2478	104.36%
3	Sydney Kings^{1}	28	18	10	64.29%	4–1	W1	9–5	9–5	2438	2380	102.44%
4	Brisbane Bullets^{2}	28	14	14	50.00%	2–3	W1	9–5	5–9	2503	2480	100.93%
5	Adelaide 36ers^{2}	28	14	14	50.00%	2–3	L2	6–8	8–6	2687	2681	100.22%
6	New Zealand Breakers^{3}	28	12	16	42.86%	2–3	L1	7–7	5–9	2649	2641	100.30%
7	Illawarra Hawks^{3}	28	12	16	42.86%	1–4	L3	8–6	4–10	2493	2664	93.58%
8	Cairns Taipans	28	6	22	21.43%	2–3	L1	3–11	3–11	2400	2576	93.17%

Updated to match(es) played on 17 February 2019. Source: NBL.com.au

=== Ladder progression ===
- Numbers highlighted in green indicate that the team finished the round inside the top four.
- Numbers highlighted in blue indicates the team finished first on the ladder in that round.
- Numbers highlighted in red indicates the team finished last place on the ladder in that round.

2018–19 NBL season
Team	1	2	3	4	5	6	7	8	9	10	11	12	13	14	15	16	17	18
Adelaide 36ers	3	4	4	6	7	5	5	6	5	5	5	5	5	5	5	4	4	5
Brisbane Bullets	5	6	6	3	5	6	4	4	4	4	4	4	4	4	4	5	5	4
Cairns Taipans	2	3	8	8	8	8	8	8	8	8	8	8	8	8	8	8	8	8
Illawarra Hawks	8	7	7	7	6	7	7	5	6	6	6	7	6	6	6	6	6	7
Melbourne United	4	2	2	2	2	2	2	2	3	1	3	3	2	2	1	1	2	2
New Zealand Breakers	6	8	5	5	4	4	6	7	7	7	7	6	7	7	7	7	7	6
Perth Wildcats	1	1	1	1	1	1	1	1	1	3	2	2	3	3	2	2	1	1
Sydney Kings	7	5	3	4	3	3	3	3	2	2	1	1	1	1	3	3	3	3

=== Seedings ===
1. Perth Wildcats
2. Melbourne United
3. Sydney Kings
4. Brisbane Bullets

The NBL tie-breaker system as outlined in the NBL Rules and Regulations states that in the case of an identical win–loss record, the overall points percentage will determine order of seeding.

==== Playoff bracket ====
Semifinals
1	Perth Wildcats	89	84	X
4	Brisbane Bullets	59	79	X
2	Melbourne United	95	90	X
3	Sydney Kings	73	76	X

Grand Final
1	Perth Wildcats	81	74	96	97	X
2	Melbourne United	71	92	67	82	X

== Semi-Finals Series ==
=== (2) Melbourne United vs. (3) Sydney Kings ===
28 February 2019	Melbourne United	95–73 (Series: Melbourne leads series, 1–0)	Sydney Kings	Melbourne Arena, Melbourne
19:50	Scoring by quarter: 24–24, 28–11, 19–18, 24–20
Fox Sports	Pts: Ware 22; Rebs: Boone 7 Asts: Ware 7	boxscore	Pts: Newley 17; Rebs: Bogut 7 Asts: Bowen, Lisch, Newley 3	Attendance: 7,566

3 March 2019	Sydney Kings	76–90 (Series: Melbourne wins series, 2–0)	Melbourne United	Qudos Bank Arena, Sydney
14:20	Scoring by quarter: 24–22, 16–20, 18–25, 18–23
Fox Sports	Pts: Adnam, Lisch 13; Rebs: Bogut 12; Asts: Bogut, Randle 5	boxscore	Pts: Ware 30; Rebs: Boone 8 Asts: McCarron 5	Attendance: 14,569

=== (1) Perth Wildcats vs. (4) Brisbane Bullets ===
28 February 2019	Perth Wildcats	89–59 (Series: Perth leads series, 1–0)	Brisbane Bullets	RAC Arena, Perth
19:20	Scoring by quarter: 23–16, 18–24, 30–15, 18–4
Fox Sports	Pts: Cotton 22; Rebs: Kay 10; Asts: Cotton 6	boxscore	Pts: Gliddon 18; Rebs: Hodgson 7 Asts: Patterson 6	Attendance: 10,587

2 March 2019	Brisbane Bullets	79–84 (Series: Perth wins series, 2–0)	Perth Wildcats	Brisbane Entertainment Centre, Brisbane
13:50	Scoring by quarter: 20–25, 21–24, 21–20, 17–15
Fox Sports	Pts: Patterson 19; Rebs: Bairstow 7 Asts: Gibson 5	boxscore	Pts: White 24; Rebs: Kay 15; Asts: Cotton 10	Attendance: 5,519

== Grand Final Series ==
=== (1) Perth Wildcats vs. (2) Melbourne United ===
8 March 2019	Perth Wildcats	81–71 (Series: Perth leads series, 1–0)	Melbourne United	RAC Arena, Perth
19:20	Scoring by quarter: 14–13, 15–20, 31–14, 21–24
Fox Sports	Pts: White 19; Rebs: Cotton, White 8 Asts: Cotton 8	boxscore	Pts: Ware 19; Rebs: Boone 12; Asts: Ware 4	Attendance: 12,490

10 March 2019	Melbourne United	92–74 (Series: Series tied, 1–1)	Perth Wildcats	Melbourne Arena, Melbourne
14:50	Scoring by quarter: 20–20, 22–21, 26–16, 24–17
Fox Sports	Pts: Goulding, Ware 14; Rebs: Kennedy 14; Asts: Kennedy, McCarron 4	boxscore	Pts: Cotton 19; Rebs: Kay 8 Asts: Cotton, White 4	Attendance: 10,062

15 March 2019	Perth Wildcats	96–67 (Series: Perth leads series, 2–1)	Melbourne United	RAC Arena, Perth
19:35	Scoring by quarter: 21–16, 21–20, 28–15, 26–16
Fox Sports	Pts: White 31; Rebs: Kay, White 7 Asts: Cotton 10	boxscore	Pts: Barlow, Kennedy 13; Rebs: Kennedy 10; Asts: Kennedy 6	Attendance: 13,412

17 March 2019	Melbourne United	84–97 (Series: Perth wins series, 3–1)	Perth Wildcats	Melbourne Arena, Melbourne
14:20	Scoring by quarter: 28–26, 17–27, 12–15, 27–29
Fox Sports	Pts: Ware 18; Rebs: Boone 7 Asts: Goulding, Ware 4	boxscore	Pts: Cotton 28; Rebs: Kay 10; Asts: Martin 6	Attendance: 10,007
