= 1991 NBL Finals =

- League: National Basketball League
- Sport: Basketball
- Duration: 25 September - 27 October 1991
- Number of teams: 6
- TV partner: Seven Network

NBL Finals
- Champions: Perth Wildcats
- Runners-up: Eastside Spectres
- Finals MVP: Pete Hansen

Seasons
- ← 1990 1992 →

The 1991 NBL Finals was the championship series of the 1991 season of Australia's National Basketball League (NBL) and the conclusion of the season's playoffs. The Perth Wildcats defeated the Eastside Spectres in three games (2-1) for their second NBL championship.

== Format ==
The 1991 National Basketball League Finals started on 25 September and concluded on 27 October. The playoffs consisted of two best of three Elimination Finals, two best of three Semifinals and the best of three game Grand Final series. As the two top teams at the end of the regular season, Perth and Eastside both qualified for home court advantage during the Semifinals.

== Qualification ==
=== Qualified teams ===
Team	Finals appearance	Previous appearance	Previous best performance
Perth Wildcats	5th	1990	Champions (1990)
Eastside Spectres	7th	1990	Runner up (1981)
Geelong Supercats	4th	1984	Runner up (1982)
Adelaide 36ers	7th	1989	Champions (1986)
North Melbourne Giants	4th	1990	Champions (1989)
Melbourne Tigers	3rd	1990	5th (1989, 1990)

== Ladder ==
This is the ladder at the end of season, before the finals. The top 6 teams qualified for the finals series.

Pos	1991 NBL season											
Pos	Team	Pld	W	L	PCT	Last 5	Streak	Home	Away	PF	PA	PP
1	Perth Wildcats	26	22	4	84.62%	5–0	W8	12–1	10–3	2750	2508	109.65%
2	Eastside Spectres^{1}	26	17	9	65.38%	5–0	W5	10–3	7–6	2932	2792	105.01%
3	Geelong Supercats^{1}	26	17	9	65.38%	3–2	W2	11–2	6–7	3143	2980	105.47%
4	Adelaide 36ers^{2}	26	16	10	61.54%	4–1	L1	11–2	5–8	3028	2876	105.29%
5	Melbourne Tigers^{2}	26	16	10	61.54%	3–2	L2	10–3	6–7	3104	3044	101.97%
6	North Melbourne Giants^{2}	26	16	10	61.54%	3–2	W1	8–5	8–5	3047	2840	107.29%
7	Sydney Kings^{3}	26	14	12	53.85%	4–1	W4	9–4	5–8	2821	2775	101.66%
8	Gold Coast Cougars^{3}	26	14	12	53.85%	0–5	L6	8–5	6–7	2781	2805	99.14%
9	Brisbane Bullets	26	13	13	50.00%	2–3	W1	8–5	5–8	2912	2968	98.11%
10	Canberra Cannons^{4}	26	9	17	34.62%	1–4	L1	7–6	2–11	2741	2781	98.56%
11	Southern Melbourne Saints^{4}	26	9	17	34.62%	1–4	L2	6–7	3–10	2872	3094	92.82%
12	Hobart Tassie Devils	26	8	18	30.77%	1–4	L2	6–7	2–11	2811	3047	92.25%
13	Illawarra Hawks	26	6	20	23.08%	2–3	L1	4–9	2–11	3032	3196	94.87%
14	Newcastle Falcons	26	5	21	19.23%	2–3	W1	4–9	1–12	2803	3071	91.27%

Updated to match(es) played on 22 September 1991. Source: NBL.com.au

The NBL tie-breaker system as outlined in the NBL Rules and Regulations states that in the case of an identical win–loss record, the results in games played between the teams will determine order of seeding.

^{1}Head-to-Head between Eastside Spectres and Geelong Supercats (1-1). Eastside Spectres won For and Against(+1).

^{2}3-way Head-to-Head between Adelaide 36ers (3-1), Melbourne Tigers (2-2) and North Melbourne Giants (1-3).

^{3}Head-to-Head between Sydney Kings and Gold Coast Rollers (1-1). Sydney Kings won For and Against (+8).

^{4}Head-to-Head between Canberra Cannons and Southern Melbourne Saints (1-1). Canberra Cannons won For and Against (+44).

== Playoff bracket ==
Elimination Finals
4	Adelaide 36ers	129	132	X
5	Melbourne Tigers	115	96	X
3	Geelong Supercats	139	116	113
6	North Melbourne Giants	119	136	125

Semifinals
1	Perth Wildcats	102	105	X
4	Adelaide 36ers	99	104	X
2	Eastside Spectres	99	115	X
6	North Melbourne Giants	93	104	X

Grand Final
1	Perth Wildcats	109	81	90
2	Eastside Spectres	83	86	80

== Elimination Finals ==
=== (4) Adelaide 36ers vs (5) Melbourne Tigers ===
==== Game 1 ====
Seven Network

25 September

boxscore

Melbourne Tigers 115, Adelaide 36ers 129
Scoring by quarter: 40-34, 27-23, 28-30, 20-42
Pts: Andrew Gaze 39; Rebs: Gaze, Simmons 8 each Asts: Andrew Gaze 8	Pts: Darryl Pearce 29; Rebs: Mark Davis 14; Asts: Butch Hays 11
Adelaide leads series, 1-0

The Glass House, Melbourne
Attendance: 7,200
Referees: Bill Mildenhall, Geoff Weeks

==== Game 2 ====
Seven Network

27 September

boxscore

Adelaide 36ers 132, Melbourne Tigers 96
Scoring by quarter: 37-27, 32-22, 34-24, 29-23
Pts: Mark Davis 31; Rebs: Mark Davis 15; Asts: Butch Hays 17	Pts: Andrew Gaze 40; Rebs: Dave Simmons 13; Asts: Colbert, Giddey 3 each
Adelaide wins series, 2-0

Apollo Stadium, Adelaide
Attendance: 3,000
Referees: Bill Mildenhall, Geoff Weeks

=== (3) Geelong Supercats vs (6) North Melbourne Giants ===
==== Game 1 ====
Seven Network

25 September

boxscore

Geelong Supercats 139, North Melbourne Giants 119
Scoring by quarter: 36-30, 38-31, 31-30, 34-88
Pts: Shane Heal 36; Rebs: Terry Dozier 13; Asts: Shane Heal 11	Pts: Scott Fisher 44; Rebs: Scott Fisher 10; Asts: Marty Clarke 6
Geelong leads series, 1-0

Geelong Arena
Attendance: 2,000
Referees: Eddie Crouch, Robert Barnett

==== Game 2 ====
Seven Network

27 September

boxscore

North Melbourne Giants 136, Geelong Supercats 116
Scoring by quarter: 38-31, 37-25, 31-25, 30-35
Pts: Paul Maley 42; Rebs: Maley, Fisher 13 each Asts: Scott Fisher 6	Pts: Vince Hinchen 27; Rebs: John Dorge 9 Asts: Shane Heal 7
Series tied, 1-1

The Glass House, Melbourne
Attendance: 7,000
Referees: Eddie Crouch, Robert Barnett

==== Game 3 ====
Seven Network

29 September

boxscore

Geelong Supercats 113, North Melbourne Giants 125
Scoring by quarter: 29-35, 31-28, 30-30, 23-32
Pts: Bobby Locke 31; Rebs: Dorge, Dozier 11 each Asts: Shane Heal 7	Pts: Pat Reidy 32; Rebs: Scott Fisher 14; Asts: Fisher, Leader 6 each
North Melbourne wins series, 2-1

Geelong Arena
Attendance: 2,000
Referees: Eddie Crouch, Robert Barnett

== Semifinals ==
=== (2) Eastside Spectres vs (6) North Melbourne Giants ===
==== Game 1 ====
Seven Network

4 October

boxscore

North Melbourne Giants 93, Eastside Spectres 99
Scoring by quarter: 22-25, 18-26, 28-23, 25-25
Pts: Paul Maley 32; Rebs: Paul Maley 12; Asts: Scott Fisher 4	Pts: Bruce Bolden 29; Rebs: Bruce Bolden 13; Asts: Bruce Bolden 5
Eastside leads series, 1-0

The Glass House, Melbourne
Attendance: 7,200
Referees: Eddie Crouch, Geoff Weeks

==== Game 2 ====
Seven Network

11 October

boxscore

Eastside Spectres 115, North Melbourne Giants 104
Scoring by quarter: 24-24, 29-21, 34-24, 28-35
Pts: Bruce Bolden 27; Rebs: Bruce Bolden 18; Asts: Perry, Lockhart 7 each	Pts: Paul Maley 25; Rebs: Paul Maley 18; Asts: Mark Leader8
Eastside wins series, 2-0

The Glass House, Melbourne
Attendance: 7,200
Referees: Eddie Crouch, Geoff Weeks

=== (1) Perth Wildcats vs (4) Adelaide 36ers ===
==== Game 1 ====
Seven Network

5 October

boxscore

Adelaide 36ers 99, Perth Wildcats 102
Scoring by quarter: 28-22, 20-25, 31-34, 20-21
Pts: Mike McKay 23; Rebs: Mark Bradtke 11; Asts: Butch Hays 9	Pts: Ricky Grace 24; Rebs: Pinder, Crawford 10 each Asts: Ricky Grace 8
Perth leads series, 1-0

Apollo Stadium, Adelaide
Attendance: 3,000
Referees: Bill Mildenhall, Robert Barnett

==== Game 2 ====
Seven Network

10 October

boxscore

Perth Wildcats 105, Adelaide 36ers 104
Scoring by quarter: 27-24, 29-25, 28-25, 21-30
Pts: Ricky Grace 27; Rebs: James Crawford 10; Asts: Ricky Grace 9	Pts: Butch Hays 23; Rebs: Bradtke, Davis 9 each Asts: Butch Hays 8
Perth wins series, 2-0

Perth Entertainment Centre
Attendance: 8,200
Referees: Bill Mildenhall, Robert Barnett

== Grand Final series ==
=== (1) Perth Wildcats vs (2) Eastside Spectres ===
==== Game 1 ====
Seven Network

19 October

boxscore

Eastside Spectres 83, Perth Wildcats 109
Scoring by quarter: 19-34, 22-21, 22-23, 20-31
Pts: Bruce Bolden 22; Rebs: Dean Uthoff 13; Asts: Darren Perry 8	Pts: Ricky Grace 21; Rebs: Andrew Vlahov 11; Asts: Ricky Grace 7
Perth leads series, 1-0

The Glass House, Melbourne
Attendance: 7,200
Referees: Eddie Crouch, Bill Mildenhall

==== Game 2 ====
Seven Network

25 October

boxscore

Perth Wildcats 81, Eastside Spectres 86
Scoring by quarter: 22-21, 25-22, 15-26, 19-17
Pts: Ricky Grace 17; Rebs: Andrew Vlahov 11; Asts: Ricky Grace 7	Pts: Bruce Bolden 25; Rebs: Kent Lockhart 12; Asts: Perry, Uthoff 4 each
Series tied, 1-1

Perth Entertainment Centre
Attendance: 8,200
Referees: Bill Mildenhall, Eddie Crouch

==== Game 3 ====
Seven Network

27 October

boxscore

Perth Wildcats 90, Eastside Spectres 80
Scoring by quarter: 22-27, 25-31, 13-22, 26-29
Pts: Pinder, Crawford 19 each Rebs: James Crawford 14; Asts: Mike Ellis 7	Pts: Bruce Bolden 29; Rebs: Bruce Bolden 15; Asts: Kent Lockhart 4
Perth wins series, 2–1; Grand Final MVP: Pete Hansen (Perth)

Perth Entertainment Centre
Attendance: 8,200
Referees: Eddie Crouch, Bill Mildenhall

== See also ==
- 1991 NBL season
