= 2021 NBL Finals =

Tournament details
- Country: Australia
- Dates: 10 – 25 June
- Season: 2020–21
- Teams: 4
- Defending champions: Perth Wildcats

Final positions
- Champions: Melbourne United (6th title)
- Runner-up: Perth Wildcats
- Semifinalists: Illawarra Hawks; S.E. Melbourne Phoenix

Tournament statistics
- Matches played: 9
- Attendance: 48,420 (5,380 per match)
- Scoring leader(s): Chris Goulding (Melbourne)

Awards
- MVP: Jock Landale (Melbourne)

The 2021 NBL Finals was the championship series of the 2020–21 NBL season and the conclusion of the season.

== Format ==
The finals are being played in June 2021 between the top four teams of the regular season, consisting of two best-of-three semi-final and one best-of-five final series, where the higher seed hosts the first, third and fifth games.

== Qualification ==
=== Qualified teams ===
| Team | Date of qualification | Round of qualification | Finals appearance | Previous appearance | Previous best performance | Ref. |
|---|---|---|---|---|---|---|
| Melbourne United | 13 May 2021 | 18 | 26th | 2020 | Champions (1993, 1997, 2006, 2008, 2018) | |
| Perth Wildcats | 15 May 2021 | 18 | 35th | 2020 | Champions (1990, 1991, 1995, 2000, 2010, 2014, 2016, 2017, 2019, 2020) | |
| Illawarra Hawks | 1 June 2021 | 21 | 21st | 2017 | Champions (2001) | |
| S.E. Melbourne Phoenix | 8 June 2021 | 21 | 1st | N/A | | |

=== Ladder ===
| Pos | 2020–21 NBL season | | | | | | | | | | | |
| Pos | Team | Pld | W | L | PCT | Last 5 | Streak | Home | Away | PF | PA | PP |
|---|---|---|---|---|---|---|---|---|---|---|---|---|
| 1 | Melbourne United | 36 | 28 | 8 | 77.78% | 4–1 | W3 | 14–4 | 14–4 | 3189 | 2956 | 107.88% |
| 2 | Perth Wildcats | 36 | 25 | 11 | 69.44% | 3–2 | L2 | 13–5 | 12–6 | 3133 | 2900 | 108.03% |
| 3 | Illawarra Hawks | 36 | 20 | 16 | 55.56% | 4–1 | L1 | 11–7 | 9–9 | 2962 | 2954 | 100.27% |
| 4 | S.E. Melbourne Phoenix | 36 | 19 | 17 | 52.78% | 2–3 | L1 | 9–9 | 10–8 | 3217 | 3124 | 102.98% |
| 5 | Sydney Kings | 36 | 19 | 17 | 52.78% | 4–1 | W3 | 11–7 | 8–10 | 3112 | 3087 | 100.81% |
| 6 | Brisbane Bullets | 36 | 18 | 18 | 50.00% | 4–1 | W1 | 9–9 | 9–9 | 3204 | 3274 | 97.86% |
| 7 | Adelaide 36ers | 36 | 13 | 23 | 36.11% | 0–5 | L7 | 10–8 | 3–15 | 2985 | 3156 | 94.58% |
| 8 | New Zealand Breakers | 36 | 12 | 24 | 33.33% | 2–3 | L1 | 8–10 | 4–14 | 2937 | 3021 | 97.22% |
| 9 | Cairns Taipans | 36 | 8 | 28 | 22.22% | 1–4 | L2 | 6–12 | 2–16 | 2940 | 3207 | 91.67% |

Updated to match(es) played on 9 June 2021. Source: NBL.com.au

=== Ladder progression ===
- Numbers highlighted in green indicate that the team finished the round inside the top four.
- Numbers highlighted in blue indicates the team finished first on the ladder in that round.
- Numbers highlighted in red indicates the team finished last place on the ladder in that round.

2020–21 NBL season
| Team | 1 | 2 | 3 | 4 | 5 | NBL Cup | | | | 10 | 11 | 12 | 13 | 14 | 15 | 16 | 17 | 18 | 19 | 20 | 21 |
| Team | 1 | 2 | 3 | 4 | 5 | 6 | 7 | 8 | 9 | 10 | 11 | 12 | 13 | 14 | 15 | 16 | 17 | 18 | 19 | 20 | 21 |
|---|---|---|---|---|---|---|---|---|---|---|---|---|---|---|---|---|---|---|---|---|---|
| Adelaide 36ers | 3 | 5 | 3 | 3 | 3 | 4 | 6 | 5 | 7 | 7 | 7 | 7 | 7 | 7 | 7 | 7 | 7 | 7 | 7 | 7 | 7 |
| Brisbane Bullets | 6 | 9 | 5 | 6 | 6 | 7 | 5 | 4 | 5 | 5 | 6 | 6 | 5 | 6 | 6 | 6 | 6 | 6 | 6 | 6 | 6 |
| Cairns Taipans | 4 | 7 | 8 | 8 | 8 | 8 | 9 | 9 | 9 | 9 | 9 | 9 | 9 | 9 | 9 | 9 | 9 | 9 | 9 | 9 | 9 |
| Illawarra Hawks | 2 | 3 | 1 | 2 | 2 | 2 | 4 | 3 | 3 | 4 | 3 | 5 | 4 | 5 | 5 | 5 | 5 | 4 | 4 | 3 | 3 |
| Melbourne United | 1 | 1 | 2 | 1 | 1 | 1 | 1 | 1 | 1 | 2 | 2 | 2 | 1 | 1 | 1 | 1 | 1 | 1 | 1 | 1 | 1 |
| New Zealand Breakers | – | 8 | 9 | 9 | 9 | 9 | 8 | 8 | 8 | 8 | 8 | 8 | 8 | 8 | 8 | 8 | 8 | 8 | 8 | 8 | 8 |
| Perth Wildcats | – | 2 | 4 | 7 | 7 | 3 | 2 | 2 | 2 | 1 | 1 | 1 | 2 | 2 | 2 | 2 | 2 | 2 | 2 | 2 | 2 |
| S.E. Melbourne Phoenix | 7 | 6 | 6 | 4 | 4 | 5 | 3 | 7 | 4 | 3 | 4 | 3 | 3 | 3 | 4 | 4 | 4 | 3 | 3 | 4 | 4 |
| Sydney Kings | 5 | 4 | 7 | 5 | 5 | 6 | 7 | 6 | 6 | 6 | 5 | 4 | 6 | 4 | 3 | 3 | 3 | 5 | 5 | 5 | 5 |

=== Seedings ===
1. Melbourne United
2. Perth Wildcats
3. Illawarra Hawks
4. South East Melbourne Phoenix

The NBL tie-breaker system as outlined in the NBL Rules and Regulations states that in the case of an identical win–loss record, the overall points percentage will determine order of seeding.

==== Playoff Bracket ====
Semifinals
1 | Melbourne United | 96 | 79 | 84
4 | S.E. Melbourne Phoenix | 78 | 90 | 74
2 | Perth Wildcats | 72 | 75 | 79
3 | Illawarra Hawks | 74 | 71 | 71

Grand Final
1 | Melbourne United | 73 | 83 | 81 | X | X
2 | Perth Wildcats | 70 | 74 | 76 | X | X

== Semi-finals series ==
=== (2) Perth Wildcats vs. (3) Illawarra Hawks ===
| 10 June 2021 | Perth Wildcats | 72–74 (Series: Illawarra leads series, 1–0) | Illawarra Hawks | RAC Arena, Perth |
| 19:30 | Scoring by quarter: 22–16, 17–17, 17–19, 16–22 |
| ESPN, SBS Viceland | Pts: Blanchfield 24; Rebs: Mooney 16; Asts: Bairstow, Norton 3 | boxscore report | Pts: Jessup 17; Rebs: Simon 9 Asts: Naar 5 | Attendance: 7,662; Referees: Michael Aylen, Mitch Hare, Ruben Woolcock |

| 12 June 2021 | Illawarra Hawks | 71–79 (Series: Series tied, 1–1) | Perth Wildcats | WIN Entertainment Centre, Wollongong |
| 17:30 | Scoring by quarter: 13–16, 18–12, 22–32, 18–19 |
| ESPN, SBS Viceland | Pts: Harvey 24; Rebs: Froling 6 Asts: Simon 5 | boxscore report | Pts: Mooney 18; Rebs: Travers 10; Asts: White 6 | Attendance: 5,217; Referees: Vaughan Mayberry, Damian Lyons, Mitch Hare |

| 14 June 2021 | Perth Wildcats | 79–71 (Series: Perth wins series, 2–1) | Illawarra Hawks | RAC Arena, Perth |
| 19:30 | Scoring by quarter: 23–15, 23–17, 9–19, 24–20 |
| ESPN, SBS Viceland | Pts: Blanchfield 24; Rebs: Mooney 14; Asts: Travers 4 | boxscore report | Pts: Froling 14; Rebs: Simon 11; Asts: Simon 4 | Attendance: 8,986; Referees: Vaughan Mayberry, Mitch Hare, James Griguol |

Regular season series
Perth won 3–1 in the regular season series

7 March 2021

boxscore

Illawarra Hawks 70, Perth Wildcats 87

John Cain Arena, Melbourne

26 March 2021

boxscore

Perth Wildcats 81, Illawarra Hawks 70

RAC Arena, Perth

16 April 2021

boxscore

Perth Wildcats 83, Illawarra Hawks 69

RAC Arena, Perth

1 June 2021

boxscore

Illawarra Hawks 81, Perth Wildcats 79

WIN Entertainment Centre, Wollongong

=== (1) Melbourne United vs. (4) South East Melbourne Phoenix ===
| 11 June 2021 | Melbourne United | 96–78 (Series: Melbourne leads series, 1–0) | South East Melbourne Phoenix | Qudos Bank Arena, Sydney |
| 19:30 | Scoring by quarter: 26–20, 32–18, 27–16, 11–24 |
| ESPN, SBS Viceland | Pts: Landale 26; Rebs: Peatling 6 Asts: McCarron 5 | boxscore report | Pts: Moore 17; Rebs: Broekhoff, Wetzell 7 Asts: Creek 6 | Attendance: 500; Referees: Chris Reid, Daniel Battye, James Griguol |

| 13 June 2021 | South East Melbourne Phoenix | 90–79 (Series: Series tied, 1–1) | Melbourne United | Qudos Bank Arena, Sydney |
| 15:00 | Scoring by quarter: 26–28, 20–22, 20–20, 24–9 |
| ESPN, SBS Viceland | Pts: Creek, Sykes 26; Rebs: Wetzell 8 Asts: Sykes 4 | boxscore report | Pts: Hopson 19; Rebs: Lual-Acuil, Peatling 7 Asts: McCarron 5 | Attendance: 500; Referees: Chris Reid, Damian Lyons, Ruben Woolcock |

| 15 June 2021 | Melbourne United | 84–74 (Series: Melbourne wins series, 2–1) | South East Melbourne Phoenix | Qudos Bank Arena, Sydney |
| 19:30 | Scoring by quarter: 14–24, 26–21, 18–12, 26–17 |
| ESPN, SBS Viceland | Pts: Landale 27; Rebs: Landale, McCarron 8 Asts: McCarron 6 | boxscore report | Pts: Te Rangi 22; Rebs: Creek 9 Asts: Sykes 4 | Attendance: 500; Referees: Chris Reid, Damian Lyons, Daniel Battye |

Regular season series
Melbourne won 3–2 in the regular season series

31 January 2021

boxscore

Melbourne United 96, South East Melbourne Phoenix 90

Bendigo Stadium, Bendigo

10 March 2021

boxscore

South East Melbourne Phoenix 97, Melbourne United 92 (OT)

John Cain Arena, Melbourne

27 March 2021

boxscore

South East Melbourne Phoenix 60, Melbourne United 80

John Cain Arena, Melbourne

8 May 2021

boxscore

South East Melbourne Phoenix 82, Melbourne United 93

John Cain Arena, Melbourne

16 May 2021

boxscore

Melbourne United 83, South East Melbourne Phoenix 94

John Cain Arena, Melbourne

== Grand Final series ==
=== (1) Melbourne United vs. (2) Perth Wildcats ===
| 18 June 2021 | Perth Wildcats | 70–73 (Series: Melbourne leads series, 1–0) | Melbourne United | RAC Arena, Perth |
| 18:30 | Scoring by quarter: 19–18, 16–13, 18–29, 17–13 |
| ESPN, SBS Viceland | Pts: Blanchfield 27; Rebs: Blanchfield, Mooney 7 Asts: Mooney 4 | boxscore report | Pts: Goulding 23; Rebs: McCarron 11; Asts: McCarron 6 | Attendance: 9,951; Referees: Chris Reid, Vaughan Mayberry, Michael Aylen |

| 20 June 2021 | Perth Wildcats | 74–83 (Series: Melbourne leads series, 2–0) | Melbourne United | RAC Arena, Perth |
| 15:00 | Scoring by quarter: 28–18, 14–24, 15–20, 17–21 |
| ESPN, SBS Viceland | Pts: Mooney 17; Rebs: Mooney 9 Asts: Mooney, Shervill 3 | boxscore report | Pts: Goulding 21; Rebs: Landale 17; Asts: McCarron 7 | Attendance: 11,097; Referees: Vaughan Mayberry, Chris Reid, Michael Aylen |

| 25 June 2021 | Melbourne United | 81–76 (Series: Melbourne wins series and the Championship, 3–0) | Perth Wildcats | John Cain Arena, Melbourne |
| 19:30 | Scoring by quarter: 30–19, 12–18, 16–13, 23–24 |
| ESPN, SBS Viceland | Pts: Landale 15; Rebs: Landale 9 Asts: McCarron 5 | boxscore report | Pts: Mooney, White 14; Rebs: Mooney 13; Asts: Norton 3 | Attendance: 4,507; Referees: Chris Reid, Vaughan Mayberry, Michael Aylen |

Regular season series
Melbourne won 3–2 in the regular season series

7 February 2021

boxscore

Melbourne United 75, Perth Wildcats 71

Bendigo Stadium, Bendigo

20 February 2021

boxscore

Melbourne United 85, Perth Wildcats 89

John Cain Arena, Melbourne

5 May 2021

boxscore

Melbourne United 69, Perth Wildcats 82

John Cain Arena, Melbourne

13 May 2021

boxscore

Perth Wildcats 91, Melbourne United 99

RAC Arena, Perth

4 June 2021

boxscore

Perth Wildcats 64, Melbourne United 78

RAC Arena, Perth

== See also ==
- 2020–21 NBL season
