= Matthew Knight (basketball) =

Australian basketball player (born 1985)

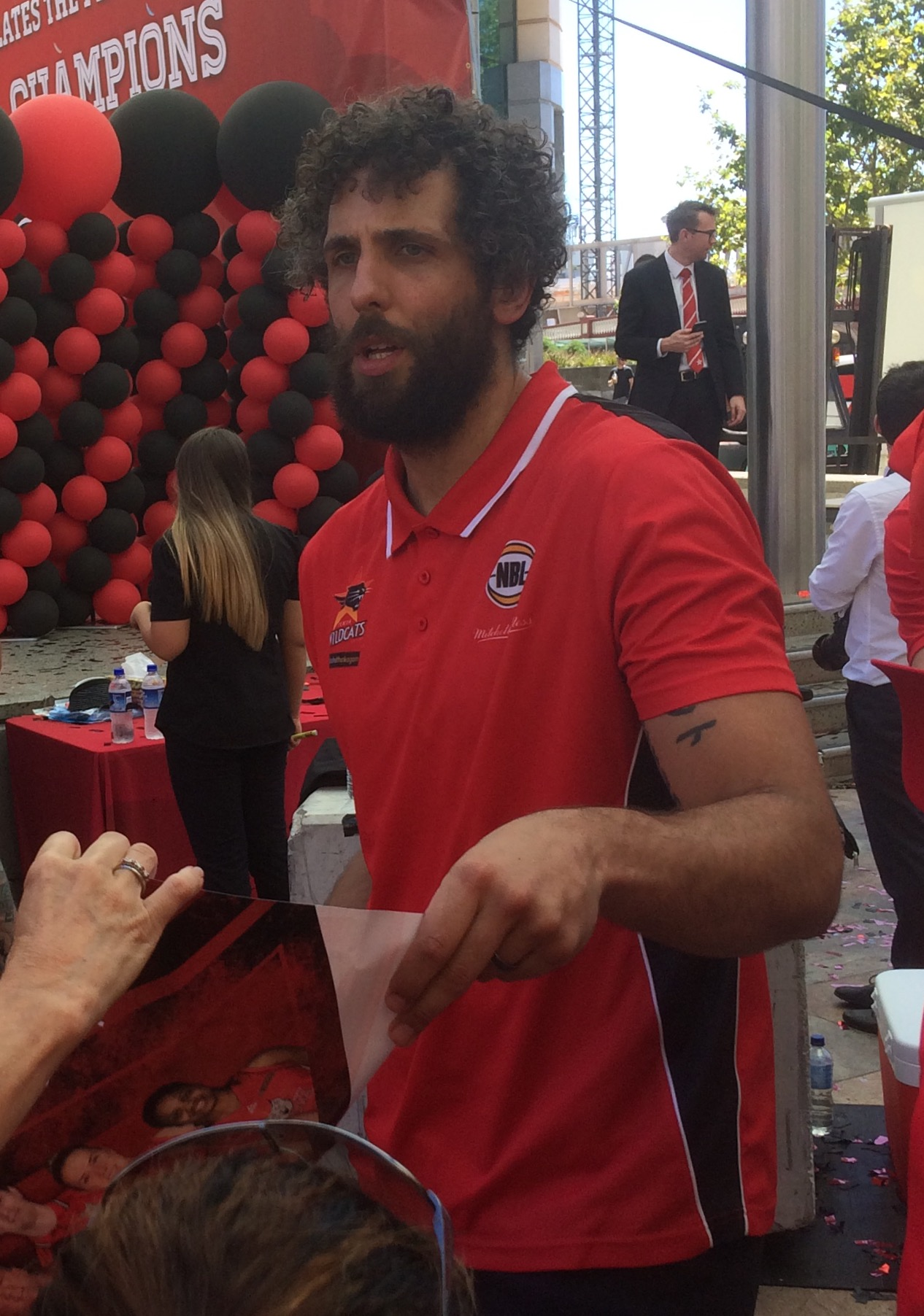
- Knight in March 2017

Personal information
- Born: 31 May 1985 (age 41) Burnie, Tasmania, Australia
- Listed height: 204 cm (6 ft 8 in)
- Listed weight: 109 kg (240 lb)

Career information
- High school: Smithton (Smithton, Tasmania)
- College: Loyola Marymount (2003–2007)
- NBA draft: 2007: undrafted
- Playing career: 2002–2017
- Position: Centre / power forward

Career history
- 2002: North-West Tasmania Brewers
- 2003: Australian Institute of Sport
- 2007–2009: West Sydney Razorbacks / Sydney Spirit
- 2009: Kecskeméti KSE
- 2009–2010: Soproni KC
- 2010: Rockingham Flames
- 2010–2017: Perth Wildcats
- 2011: Willetton Tigers

Career highlights
- 3× NBL champion (2014, 2016, 2017); All-NBL First Team (2013); 2× All-NBL Second Team (2015, 2016); All-NBL Third Team (2009); NBL Most Improved Player (2009); Hungarian League All-Star (2010); 2× First-team All-WCC (2006, 2007)

Matthew James Knight (born 31 May 1985) is an Australian former professional basketball player. He played four years of college basketball in the United States for the Loyola Marymount Lions before debuting in the National Basketball League (NBL) in 2007. After two seasons with the West Sydney Razorbacks / Sydney Spirit, he had a season in Hungary before playing eight seasons with the Perth Wildcats and winning three NBL championships. Knight endured a long list of injuries during his tenure with the Wildcats, having struggled with calf, shoulder, ankle and toe complaints, as well as suffering a number of concussion-related incidents. Three head knocks in 2017 led to Knight announcing his retirement from the NBL midway through the 2017–18 season.

== Early life ==
Born in Burnie, Tasmania, Knight played both basketball and Australian rules football as a junior. He was a talented footballer growing up, following in the steps of his father, Scott, who played five games for Collingwood in the VFL in 1984 before carving out an accomplished career in Tasmania. Knight went to watch his father play every Saturday, and during the week, he'd go with him to training. He played football right up until the end of secondary school. At that stage, he had to make a decision, and he'd heard there was more opportunity to go overseas with basketball, so he chose to commit to basketball. He also wanted to get away from the shadow of his father.

Knight attended Smithton High School in 1997 and 1998 before linking up with the Tasmanian Institute of Sport (TIS) and joining the TIS Basketball Elite Development Squad. He played for the Tasmania under-16 team in 1999 and 2000, the under-18 team in 2001 and 2002, and the under-20 team in 2003.

In 2002, Knight played in the South East Australian Basketball League (SEABL) for the North-West Tasmania Brewers and earned SEABL South Australian Youth Player of the Year honours. He moved to Canberra to attend the Australian Institute of Sport (AIS) in 2003 and played for AIS men's basketball team in the SEABL. He subsequently went on to play for the Australian junior national team at the 2003 FIBA Under-19 World Championship, where he won a gold medal.

== College career ==
=== Freshman year ===
On 10 June 2003, Knight and future Perth Wildcats teammate Damian Martin signed National Letters of Intent to join the Loyola Marymount University men's basketball program.

Knight was slowed by ankle surgery following the 2003 FIBA World Championship and subsequently missed the first six games of the 2003–04 season. He played 18 games for the Lions as a freshman, with his 3.5-rebounds-per-game average ranking 11th all-time among freshmen at LMU. He also averaged 4.9 points per game.

=== Sophomore year ===
As a sophomore in 2004–05, Knight proved to be the go-to-guy for the Lions all season, and for his efforts, he earned All-West Coast Conference honorable mention honours. He finished the regular season averaging a team-best 15.4 points and 5.9 rebounds per game while starting all 28 games. He led the team in minutes played (28.9 per game), and led the team in scoring in 18 contests. His 10.5-point turn around on the season was the best in the WCC as he scored in double figures in all but four games. He ranked sixth in the league in shooting percentage (51.2) and was second in the league in offensive rebounds (2.82). On 18 December 2004, Knight exploded for the Lions in win over San Diego State to become the first Lion to score 30 points in a regular season game since January 1998. Knight finished with 30 points on 13-of-21 shooting, going 4-of-4 from the free throw line while adding a then career-high nine rebounds.

=== Junior year ===
As a junior in 2005–06, Knight was a Player of the Year candidate in the West Coast Conference and earned first-team All-WCC honours. He ranked seventh in the WCC at 16.2 points per game and led the WCC in rebounds at 10.0 per game. During the season, he became just the 11th player in LMU history to record 1,000 career points and 500 career rebounds. He scored in double figures in every WCC game and had a career-best 32 points and 18 rebounds against Long Beach State on 30 November 2006.

=== Senior year ===
Prior to the 2006–07 season, the Lions were picked by many to challenge for the WCC title, but their season was filled with near misses (losing to Long Beach State on a half court shot at the buzzer and three other WCC games on shots at the buzzer), critical injuries (Brandon Worthy out with ACL), uphill battles (starting 1–6 in the WCC) and bad luck (drawing host team in first round) that proved too much for the sixth-seeded Lions as they finish 13–18 on the year. Their season ended with a loss to the University of Portland at the Chiles Center in the first round of the West Coast Conference Championships. In his final game for LMU, Knight recorded 15 points and seven rebounds. He finished his career with 1,466 points and 743 rebounds, ranking 10th and sixth, respectively. He became the fifth player in LMU history to rank in the top-10 in career points and rebounds. Over 28 games as a senior in 2006–07, Knight averaged 16.5 points, 7.7 rebounds, 1.1 assists and 1.1 steals per game. He subsequently earned first-team All-WCC honours for the second straight year.

Knight's four-year career at LMU was defined by the double-double. He earned his 25th double-double with 20 points and 10 rebounds against Santa Clara on 27 January 2007. Overall, he had two as a sophomore in 2004–05, broke out for 17 in 2005–06, and then six as a senior for 25 total, replacing Ime Oduok for fifth all-time in LMU history. His 17 as a junior was the most since Hank Gathers had 26 in the 1988–89 season and ranked him seventh all-time for single season double-doubles.

== Professional career ==
=== West Sydney Razorbacks / Sydney Spirit (2007–2009) ===
Knight joined the West Sydney Razorbacks of the National Basketball League (NBL) for the 2007–08 season. In his rookie season, Knight appeared in 25 of the team's 30 games and averaged 12.0 points, 8.6 rebounds and 1.1 assists per game. He also recorded six double-doubles. The Razorbacks finished the regular season in tenth place with a 10–20 record.

For the 2008–09 season, the Razorbacks were renamed the Sydney Spirit in a bid to broaden their supporter base after the collapse of the Sydney Kings. Knight continued on with the Spirit, but financial difficulties soon besieged the club mid-season. After team owner Greg Evans was served a default notice, all players were asked to take a 50 per cent pay cut. This led to the league having to step in and provide assistance in order for the club to play out the season. The Spirit missed the playoffs while Knight finished with averages of 16.6 points, 8.4 rebounds and 1.2 assists per game. He was subsequently named NBL Most Improved Player and was named in the All-NBL Third Team. He also finished second in MVP voting.

=== Hungary (2009–2010) ===
Following the conclusion of the 2008–09 NBL season, Knight joined Hungarian club Kecskeméti KSE. In six games across March and April, Knight averaged 16.2 points, 7.0 rebounds, 1.2 assists and 1.7 steals per game.

In August 2009, Knight signed a one-year deal with Soproni KC, returning to Hungary for a second stint. In March 2010, he was named an International All-Star and played in the league's all-star game against the national team of Hungary. He went on to lead Soproni to a playoff berth, but they were knocked out in the first round by Körmend, losing the series 3–0. In 27 games (24 regular season, three playoff) for the club in 2009–10, Knight averaged 15.9 points, 7.9 rebounds and 1.7 steals per game.

=== Perth Wildcats (2010–2017) ===
On 7 April 2010, Knight signed a three-year deal with the Perth Wildcats, returning to the NBL after one season in Hungary. He was lured to the club by his Sydney Spirit comrades, Damian Martin and Rob Beveridge, with the pair coming off an NBL championship with the Wildcats in 2009–10.

Upon moving to Perth, Knight joined the Rockingham Flames of the State Basketball League (SBL) and had a three-game stint with the club in mid-July.

==== 2010–11 season ====
Knight's debut season for the Wildcats began positively before a left calf injury suffered on 12 December 2010 against the Melbourne Tigers ruled him out for two months. Further injuries to Jesse Wagstaff and Shawn Redhage threw the Wildcats' season into disarray as they stumbled through the regular season with inadequate injury replacements. Knight returned to action on 11 February 2011 and helped the team reach the playoffs with a fourth-place finish and a 16–12 record. In their semi-final series against the first-seeded New Zealand Breakers, the Wildcats took Game 1 in Auckland, but then lost Games 2 and 3 to bow out of the playoffs with a 2–1 defeat. In 18 games for the Wildcats in 2010–11, Knight averaged 12.4 points, 6.7 rebounds and 1.2 assists per game.

Following the 2010–11 NBL season, Knight returned to the SBL and joined the Willetton Tigers. He was a dominant force for the Tigers over his first seven games, but in his eighth appearance for the club on 17 June, he suffered a slight calf strain to the same calf he tore on 12 December 2010. The strain ruled him out for a month of action, as he returned to the line-up on 16 July for a four-minute stint. In nine games for the Tigers in 2011, Knight averaged 18.9 points, 7.7 rebounds, 1.4 assists and 1.1 steals per game.

==== 2011–12 season ====
Knight was relatively injury free in 2011–12 and was able to lead the Wildcats to a second-place finish with a 19–9 record. After defeating the Gold Coast Blaze 2–1 in the semi-finals, the Wildcats moved on to the Grand Final series where they faced the New Zealand Breakers. They lost Game 1 in Auckland but were able to tie the series at 1–1 with a Game 2 victory in Perth, leaving the series to a Game 3 decider in Auckland. In a tightly fought game, the Wildcats went down to the Breakers 79–73, finishing runners-up with a 2–1 defeat. In 29 games for the Wildcats in 2011–12, Knight averaged 10.8 points, 5.4 rebounds and 1.3 assists per game.

==== 2012–13 season: All-NBL First Team ====
After undergoing off-season shoulder surgery, Knight entered the 2012–13 season with the mindset of wanting to be the dominant big guy in the NBL and was set to be the team's go-to guy in the paint. Knight embraced the responsibility that came with being the team's primary focus under the basket, and excelled in the Wildcats' season-opening win over the New Zealand Breakers, earning the NBL's Player of the Week award for a 20-point, nine-rebound effort. He went on to lead the Wildcats to a 22–6 record, good for second behind their arch rivals the Breakers, who amassed just three losses on the season. After sweeping the Wollongong Hawks in the semi-finals, the Wildcats returned to the Grand Final series where they again faced the Breakers – their third time facing the Breakers in a playoff series in as many years. However, with the team missing Damian Martin through injury, the Wildcats stumbled to a 2–0 defeat, as the Breakers claimed their third championship in a row, winning Game 2 in Perth at Perth Arena. Despite another disappointing end to a good overall season, Knight picked up numerous accolades for the 2012–13 season, including finishing runner-up for the Wildcats MVP, being named in the All-NBL first team and voted as the starting centre in the All-Star game, reaffirming his status as the league's premier big man. In 27 games for the Wildcats in 2012–13, he averaged 13.7 points and 7.2 rebounds per game.

==== 2013–14 season: First Championship ====
On 5 May 2013, Knight re-signed with the Wildcats on a three-year deal. He missed much of the 2013–14 NBL season through injury. The Wildcats returned to the Grand Final in 2014 and defeated the Adelaide 36ers 2–1 to win the NBL championship as Knight claimed his first title. In 18 games for the Wildcats in 2013–14, he averaged 10.1 points, 5.5 rebounds and 1.3 assists per game.

==== 2014–15 season ====
On 16 November 2014, Knight played his 100th game for the Wildcats in an 85–66 win over the Sydney Kings. In 30 minutes of action, he recorded 16 points and eight rebounds. On 9 January 2015, he was ruled out for six weeks with a toe injury. After missing six games, he returned to action earlier than expected, suiting up on 1 February against Sydney. The 2014–15 season turned out to be a near carbon copy of the 2010–11 season for the Wildcats as they finished fourth on the ladder with a 16–12 record and were knocked out in the semi-finals by the Cairns Taipans, failing to defend their 2013–14 title in a season that was plagued with injuries. In 24 games for the Wildcats in 2014–15, Knight averaged 10.5 points, 7.0 rebounds and 1.7 assists per game. He subsequently earned All-NBL second team honours.

==== 2015–16 season: Second Championship ====
For the first time in his Wildcats career, Knight had an injury-free season in 2015–16. With the team's acquisition of Nathan Jawai, Knight was able to move to his natural position of power forward. The Wildcats returned to the grand final and beat the New Zealand Breakers 2–1 to win the championship. Knight appeared in 33 of the team's 34 games in 2015–16, averaging 11.6 points, 7.9 rebounds and 1.4 assists per game. He earned All-NBL second team honours for the second straight year.

==== 2016–17 season: Third Championship ====
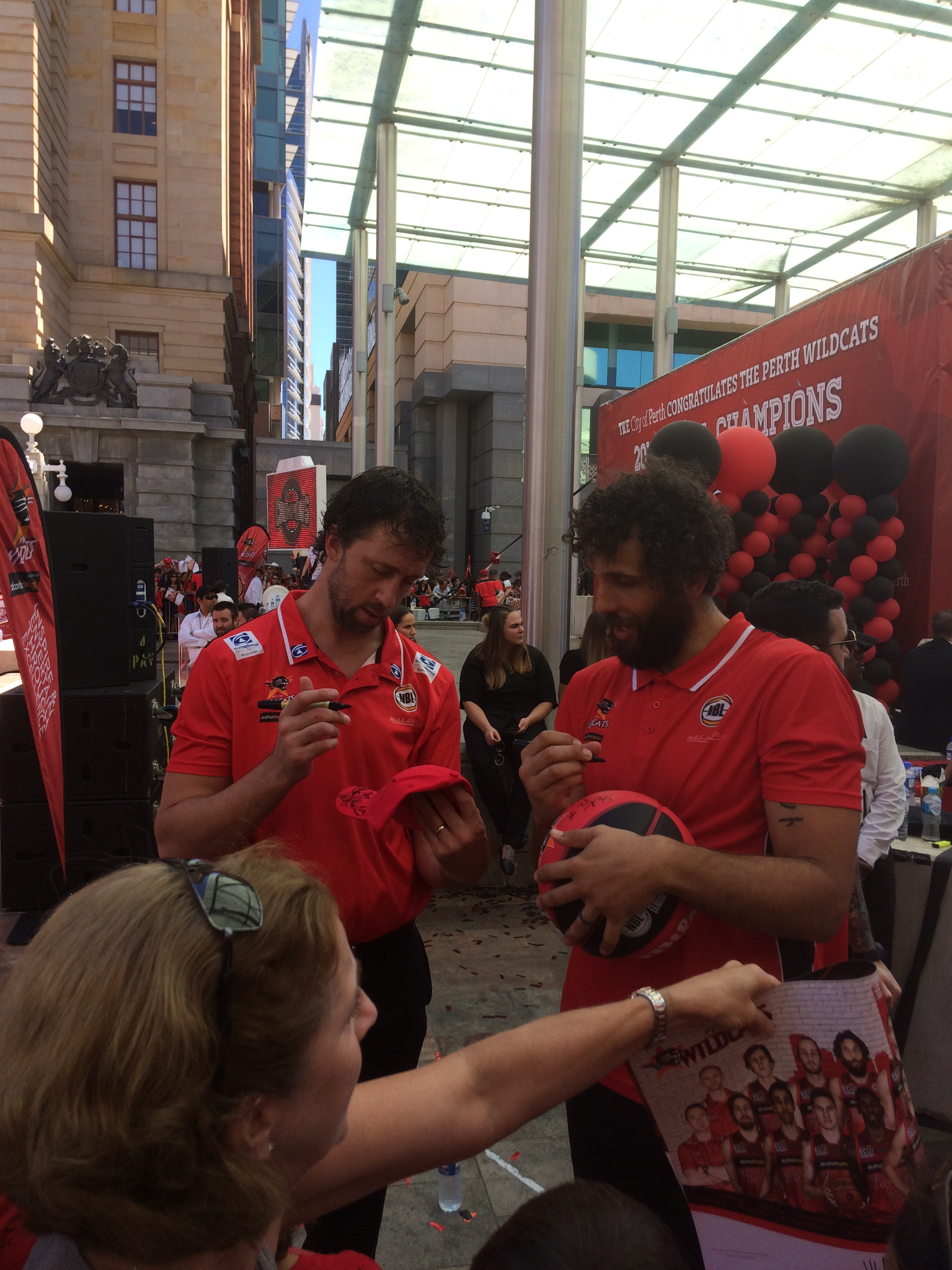
Knight (right) signing autographs alongside Matthew Nielsen at the 2017 Perth Wildcats championship ceremony

On 19 April 2016, Knight re-signed with the Wildcats on a two-year deal, a month after undergoing shoulder stabilisation surgery on his left arm. Unfortunately, injury struck down Knight again during the 2016 off-season. On 12 September 2016, he was ruled out for two months after suffering a subluxation of his right shoulder during training a week earlier. However, the joint responded well to rehab and after a week of full training with the team, Wildcats medical staff gave him the all-clear on 20 October 2016. He made his season debut the following day, recording 12 points and eight rebounds in an 80–73 win over the Illawarra Hawks. On 13 November, he had a season-best game with 24 points and 13 rebounds in an 87–86 overtime loss to the New Zealand Breakers. After averaging 13 points per game over his first eight games, Knight's form began to decline in December as he scored in double figures just three times over the next 14 games. He also had only one double-digit rebounding game during that stretch. In the Wildcats' regular season finale on 12 February 2017, Knight had his best game since late November with a double-double of 15 points and 10 rebounds to help lead the Wildcats to a 96–94 win over Melbourne United in Melbourne. The win propelled the Wildcats into their 31st consecutive NBL Finals appearance, as they finished the regular season in third place with a 15–13 record. Knight helped the Wildcats win through to another NBL Grand Final after sweeping the second-seeded Cairns Taipans in the semi-finals. In Game 1 of the best-of-five grand final series, Knight scored 18 points to help lift the Wildcats to an 89–77 win over the Illawarra Hawks. In Game 2 of the series, Knight had to be helped off the court after seemingly innocuous contact from teammate Casey Prather early in the third quarter. He was subsequently ruled out of Game 3. Despite being without Knight, the Wildcats successfully defended their title with a 3–0 series sweep. It marked the Wildcats' eighth championship and Knight's third. Knight appeared in 27 of the team's 33 games, averaging 9.4 points, 6.0 rebounds and 1.6 assists per game.

Knight sustained two head knocks over the last month of the 2016–17 NBL season, both of which resulted in him being unable to complete the game and missing a subsequent contest. Wildcats managing director Nick Marvin acknowledged that the club would consult with Knight during the 2017 off-season, with six concussion-related incidents in six years raising concerns over his long-term health.

==== 2017–18 season: Retirement brought forward ====
On 1 July 2017, Knight revealed that the 2017–18 NBL season would be his last. After battling shoulder problems and concussion in 2016–17, Knight had hoped to avoid more injuries in his final season. However, on 13 September 2017, he was ruled out for the remainder of the club's pre-season games with a thumb injury. The injury occurred in the Wildcats' opening game of the NBL Blitz. Scans revealed a small fracture and ligament damage in his right thumb, with Wildcats medical staff opting to take a non-surgical approach to repairing the injury. The injury-prone Knight suffered head knocks against Brisbane and Cairns early in the season, but concerns for his future were only fully taken into account following another head knock that came accidentally at training on 30 October. As a result, Knight brought forward his retirement plans, calling time on his 236-game NBL career on 6 November 2017. He finished his career with 2,800 points and 1,646 rebounds.

== Personal ==
On 2 December 2013, Knight and his partner Sherelle had their first child, a daughter named Mia Rose. He later married Sherelle in September 2014.

In 2013, Knight considered a switch to Australian Rules football in order to follow in his father's footsteps after attracting interest from WAFL club West Perth.
