= Jermaine Beal =

American basketball player (born 1987)

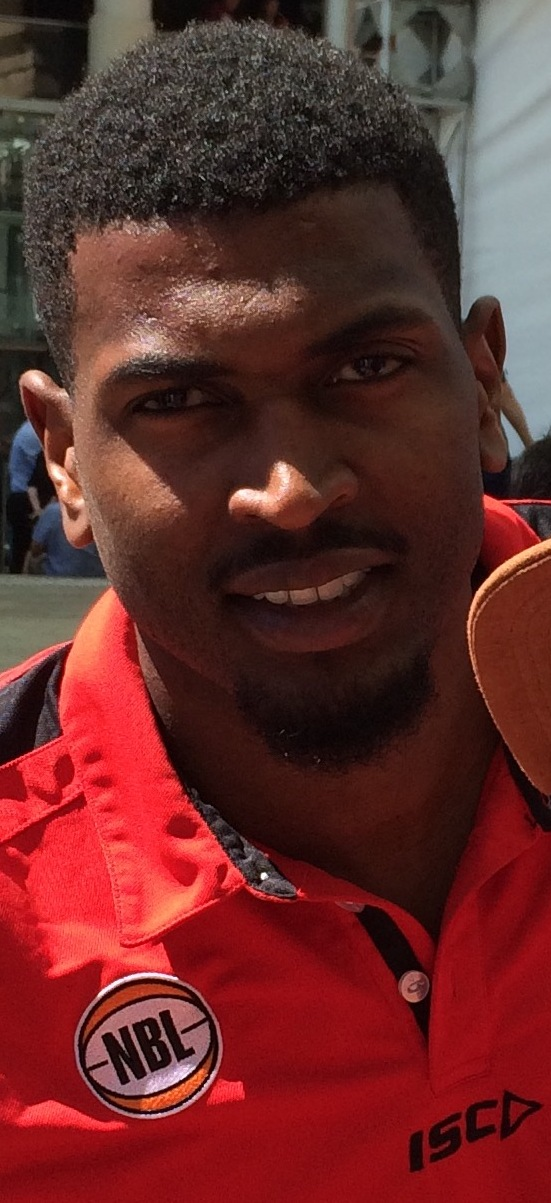
- Beal with the Perth Wildcats in 2016

Personal information
- Born: November 4, 1987 (age 39) Dallas, Texas, U.S.
- Listed height: 190 cm (6 ft 3 in)
- Listed weight: 95 kg (209 lb)

Career information
- High school: DeSoto (DeSoto, Texas)
- College: Vanderbilt (2006–2010)
- NBA draft: 2010: undrafted
- Playing career: 2010–2017
- Position: Shooting guard / point guard
- Coaching career: 2018–present

Career history

Playing
- 2010: Trefl Sopot
- 2010–2011: Austin Toros
- 2011: Erie BayHawks
- 2011–2012: VOO Verviers-Pepinster
- 2012–2013: Minas
- 2013–2016: Perth Wildcats
- 2014: Piratas de Quebradillas
- 2015: Al-Ittihad Jeddah
- 2016: Telenet Oostende
- 2016–2017: Brisbane Bullets
- 2017: Ironi Nes Ziona

Coaching
- 2018: Pittsburgh Panthers (AVO)

Career highlights
- Israeli National League champion (2017); Belgian League champion (2016); 2× NBL champion (2014, 2016); NBL Grand Final MVP (2014); All-NBL Second Team (2014); First-team All-SEC (2010)

Jermaine Darnell Beal (born November 4, 1987) is an American former professional basketball player. He had a four-year college basketball career with Vanderbilt, where between 2006 and 2010 he became the winningest four-year player in school history and earned first-team All-SEC honors as a senior. He began his professional career in Poland, before having stints in the NBA Development League, Belgium, and Brazil. In 2013, he joined the Perth Wildcats of the National Basketball League (NBL) in Australia and helped them win a championship in his first season behind his Grand Final MVP performance. After winning Club MVP honors in 2015, Beal helped the Wildcats win another title in 2016. After parting ways with the Wildcats, he won a championship in Belgium, had a short stint with the Brisbane Bullets, then won another championship, this time in Israel. His professional career ended in 2017.

== High school career ==
Beal was born in Dallas, Texas. He attended DeSoto High School in nearby DeSoto, where he was a two-time All-State honoree and helped the Eagles to a 5-A state title as a freshman and a state runner-up finish as a junior. After earning District 7-5A Sophomore of the Year honors in 2003–04, he went on to average 25 points, eight assists and five rebounds per game as a junior in 2004–05, leading the Eagles to a 37–4 mark and a runner-up finish in the Texas 4A state championship game.

On November 10, 2005, Beal signed a National Letter of Intent to play college basketball for Vanderbilt University.

As a senior in 2005–06, Beal averaged 21.5 points, six assists and five rebounds per game, becoming the school's all-time leading scorer.

== College career ==
As a freshman at Vanderbilt in 2006–07, Beal finished among the Southeastern Conference's (SEC) freshmen leaders in steals (fourth with 1.06 per game), free throw shooting (fifth at 80.0 percent) and assists (sixth with 1.79). He appeared in 34 games for the Commodores and made two starts, while averaging 3.8 points and 1.8 rebounds in 16.8 minutes per game.

As a sophomore in 2007–08, Beal totalled 158 assists, the most ever by a Vanderbilt sophomore. He was also named to the South Padre Invitational All-Tournament team for his play against Utah State and Bradley. In 34 games (33 starts), he averaged 7.6 points, 2.1 rebounds and 4.6 assists in 27.5 minutes per game.

As a junior in 2008–09, Beal was named to the Cancun Challenge All-Tournament team after averaging 14.0 points, 5.0 rebounds and 5.5 assists per game in the final two games. In 31 games (all starts) during the season, he averaged 12.5 points, 3.5 rebounds, 3.2 assists and 1.1 steals in 33.1 minutes per game.

In August 2009, the Commodores travelled to Australia for a five-game tour in which they finished with a record of 3–2. In the final game against the Townsville Crocodiles, Beal scored a tour-high 31 points. His performance against the Crocodiles caught the attention of Townsville coach Trevor Gleeson, Beal's future coach at the Perth Wildcats.

As a senior in 2009–10, Beal earned first-team All-SEC honors. He was also named to the NABC Division I All-District 21 second team, and the USBWA All-District IV team. In 33 games (32 starts), he averaged 14.6 points, 2.5 rebounds, 3.1 assists and 1.0 steals in 32.5 minutes per game, leading the team in scoring and assists, the latter for the third straight season. He finished as the winningest four-year player in school history, to go alongside 1,255 career points.

=== College statistics ===
Year	Team	GP	GS	MPG	FG%	3P%	FT%	RPG	APG	SPG	BPG	PPG
2006–07	Vanderbilt	34	2	16.8	.337	.263	.800	1.8	1.8	1.1	.1	3.8
2007–08	Vanderbilt	34	33	27.5	.384	.313	.757	2.1	4.6	.7	.0	7.6
2008–09	Vanderbilt	31	31	33.1	.421	.403	.823	3.5	3.2	1.1	.2	12.5
2009–10	Vanderbilt	33	32	32.5	.442	.379	.802	2.5	3.1	1.0	.1	14.6
Career		132	98	27.3	.413	.363	.795	2.4	3.2	1.0	.1	9.5

== Professional career ==
=== NBA Summer League (2010) ===
After going undrafted in the 2010 NBA draft, Beal joined the Miami Heat's Summer League team. In four games for the Heat in Las Vegas, he averaged 5.8 points, 1.8 assists and 1.3 steals per game. Beal was unable to secure a roster spot with the Heat, so his agent worked out deals abroad.

=== Trefl Sopot (2010) ===
Beal signed his first professional contract on August 3, 2010, with Polish team Trefl Sopot. He played in both of Sopot's EuroChallenge games against Dexia Mons-Hainaut, scoring two points on debut before going scoreless with three rebounds and three assists in the next game. In his lone appearance in the Polish League, he recorded four points, four assists, three rebounds and two steals. He went 0-of-8 from three-point range over the three contests. He was released by Sopot on October 20.

=== NBA Development League (2010–2011) ===
After returning home to Texas, Beal joined the Austin Toros of the NBA Development League in early December via the available player pool. In his debut for Austin on December 5, he played 20 minutes and had three points and three assists. On January 11, 2011, he scored 15 points in a 119–97 win over the Dakota Wizards.

On February 28, 2011, Beal was acquired by the Erie BayHawks in a three-team trade. On March 8, 2011, he scored a career-high 19 points in a 101–92 win over the Springfield Armor. The BayHawks finished the regular season with a 32–18 record and earned the fifth seed in the playoffs, where they lost 2–1 to the Reno Bighorns in the first round. In Erie's 114–111 win in game two, Beal recorded 13 points, five assists, three rebounds and a game-high three steals in 20 minutes off the bench.

In 29 games for the Toros, Beal averaged 6.9 points, 1.6 rebounds and 2.2 assists per game; and in 18 games for the BayHawks, he averaged 9.7 points, 2.2 rebounds and 3.1 assists per game.

=== VOO Verviers-Pepinster (2011–2012) ===
On August 9, 2011, Beal signed a one-year contract with Belgian team VOO Verviers-Pepinster. The team finished the 2011–12 season on the bottom of the league table with a 5–27 record. Beal appeared in 31 games and averaged 11.2 points, 2.1 rebounds and 1.6 assists per game.

=== Minas (2012–2013) ===
On September 21, 2012, after a successful trial period, Beal signed with Brazilian team Minas. He scored a season-best 28 points against Suzano on February 14, 2013. Minas finished the regular season in ninth place with a 16–18 record and lost in the first round of the playoffs. Beal appeared in 37 games and averaged 16.7 points, 2.6 rebounds, 2.4 assists and 1.1 steals per game.

=== Perth Wildcats (2013–2016) ===
==== 2013–14 season ====
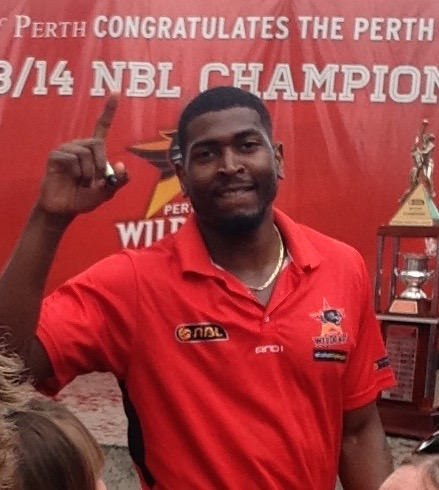
Beal in April 2014, at the Wildcats' championship ceremony

On September 2, 2013, Beal signed with the Perth Wildcats in Australia for the 2013–14 NBL season. Over his first three games, he made just six shots from 34 field goal attempts. He found his shot in round three in back-to-back road games, scoring 19 points against the New Zealand Breakers on October 24 to go with 24 points against the Sydney Kings on October 27. On November 1, he hit five three-pointers in the first quarter and finished with a game-high 21 points in an 87–47 win over the Wollongong Hawks, thus helping the Wildcats equal their best start to an NBL campaign at 6–0. On November 17, he scored a game-high 24 points with six three-pointers in an 89–76 win over the Hawks. The win took the Wildcats to an 8–0 start to the season, an all-time best for the club. On December 6, he scored a season-high 30 points and equaled a club record with eight three-pointers in a 95–91 win over the Breakers. On March 2, he scored 24 points with six three-pointers in an 85–81 win over the Kings. The Wildcats finished the regular season with a league-best 21–7 record and advanced through to the NBL Grand Final, where they faced the Adelaide 36ers. In the grand final series, Beal scored 19 points in a game one win, led a Perth fightback in game two with another 19 points, and had 15 points and four assists in a 24-point win in game three to lead the Wildcats to the NBL championship. He was subsequently named the Grand Final MVP.

In 33 games, Beal averaged 15.6 points and made 101 three-pointers. His 101 three-pointers set the record for most three-pointers made by a player in a season in the NBL's 40-minute era (since 2009), a record that stood until 2018. He also averaged 3.4 assists and 2.4 rebounds per game. For the season, he earned All-NBL Second Team honors.

In June 2014, Beal had a six-game stint in Puerto Rico with Piratas de Quebradillas of the Baloncesto Superior Nacional.

==== 2014–15 season ====
On July 17, 2014, Beal re-signed with the Wildcats on a one-year deal with a second year option. He was subsequently compared with former Wildcat Ricky Grace and became Perth's main offensive weapon in the 2014–15 NBL season.

On October 31, Beal scored a game-high 25 points—his second-biggest tally in 37 NBL appearances—to go with four assists and four steals in an 83–64 win over the Wollongong Hawks. In round six, he had his best two performances of the season, scoring 29 points against the Townsville Crocodiles on November 14, to go with 27 points against the Sydney Kings on November 16. He was subsequently named Player of the Week. On February 15, he scored 24 points in an 89–87 double-overtime loss to the Breakers. Beal was crucial in helping send the game into both overtime periods, and then put the Wildcats ahead 87–86 with two clutch free-throws in the dying moments of second overtime. The Breakers won the game with a buzzer-beating half-court shot from Cedric Jackson. He was one of the league's top five scorers through the regular season, finishing with 450 points. After finishing in fourth place with a 16–12 record, the Wildcats faced the first-seeded Cairns Taipans in the semi-finals, where they were swept 2–0 in the best-of-three series despite Beal scoring 20 points in game one and 21 points in game two.

In 30 games, Beal averaged a team-high 16.4 points and made a league-leading 69 three-pointers. He was subsequently named the club's most valuable player for the 2014–15 season.

Following the NBL season, Beal had a short stint in Saudi Arabia with Al-Ittihad Jeddah.

==== 2015–16 season ====
While contracted with the Wildcats for the 2015–16 NBL season, Beal was open to talks if rival clubs wanted to activate a buy-out clause in his deal.

On October 25, Beal had a game-high 25 points and seven assists in a 106–99 win over the Illawarra Hawks in Wollongong. Back in Wollongong on November 11, Beal helped the Wildcats defeat the Hawks 99–96 behind a comeback effort capped off by a 31–13 fourth quarter run. He scored 14 of his then season-high 26 points in the final term, including 11 after being crossed-over and having his "ankles broken" by Hawks guard Kevin Lisch with just under seven minutes to play. He finished with six three-pointers. On November 18, he recorded a career-high nine assists in a 94–88 win over the Adelaide 36ers. On December 10, Beal scored 33 of his 40 points in the second and third quarters of the Wildcats' 113–83 win over Melbourne United. He was held scoreless in the opening term before hitting nine three-pointers over the next two quarters, finishing with 10-of-19 three-pointers for the game along with seven assists. His 10 three-pointers eclipsed the previous club record of eight set by himself, Ricky Grace, Anthony Stewart and Mike Ellis. He also became just the second player in NBL history to score 40 points in a game after going scoreless in the first quarter, and became the first Wildcat to score 40 points since teammate Shawn Redhage in 2007. In the Wildcats' following game three days later, Beal recorded 23 points and a career high-tying nine assists in an 87–69 win over the Sydney Kings. His round 10 performances saw him enter NBL MVP discussions.

Beal struggled to hit top form during the second half of the season, with his hot hand often deserting him. His late-season inconsistency culminated in him going scoreless from just one attempt in 12 minutes against the Kings on February 5. Due to suffering from back tightness, Beal was rested for the final road game of the season on February 10. On February 14, he returned from his first missed game in his NBL career to score 15 points in the Wildcats' regular-season finale against the 36ers. The Wildcats finished in second place with an 18–10 record and advanced through to the best-of-three NBL Grand Final series, where they faced the New Zealand Breakers. After scoring seven points in an 82–76 win in game one, Beal had a game-high 20 points in game two but made a crucial late-game turnover in the dying seconds of the match, in what was a 72–68 loss. He went on to score 14 points in a 75–52 game three win, as he claimed his second NBL championship in helping the Wildcats win their seventh title. In 33 games during the 2015–16 season, Beal averaged 15.6 points, 2.4 rebounds and 3.6 assists per game.

During the off-season, initial reports indicated Beal was keen to return to Perth for a fourth season. However, the Wildcats were anxious to add more youth to its roster in the import positions, conscious of an ageing core of local players. Additionally, Beal was said to have "priced himself out of Perth". As a result, the Wildcats parted ways with Beal and signed Jaron Johnson in his place. Beloved in the city of Perth for his long-range shooting, Beal scored more points (1,521) than any other player in the NBL across the previous three seasons, with New Zealand's Corey Webster the next best with 1,277 points.

=== Telenet Oostende (2016) ===
Soon after winning his second championship with the Wildcats, Beal made a return to Belgium to play for Telenet Oostende, joining the team as injury cover for Niels Marnegrave. Oostende finished the 2015–16 season in first place with a 23–5 record. They made it through to the finals series with a 2–0 victory over Liège Basket in the quarter-finals, and a 3–2 victory over Limburg United in the semi-finals. In game three of Oostende's semi-finals series against Limburg, Beal scored a season-high nine points in a 78–64 win. In June 2016, Oostende defeated Okapi Aalstar 3–1 in the finals series to claim the Belgian League championship. In 18 games for Oostende, he averaged 3.6 points, 1.9 rebounds and 1.9 assists in 17.5 minutes per game.

=== Brisbane Bullets (2016–2017) ===
On August 12, 2016, Beal signed with the Brisbane Bullets on a one-year deal with an option for a second season. He joined Brisbane with a weight of expectation, and he was one of the team's standouts in the pre-season. In the Bullets' season opener on October 6, Beal scored 14 points in a 72–65 win over the Perth Wildcats in Brisbane. He had just two points at half time before scoring 12 third-quarter points. On October 16, he scored a season-high 21 points in a 96–93 overtime loss to the Adelaide 36ers. On November 19, he scored 20 points in a 105–87 win over the 36ers. On December 1, in his first game back in Perth, Beal scored 17 points in a 90–75 win over the Wildcats. He received a warm reception when he was introduced to the Perth Arena crowd before the match and scored 11 points in the opening term to help spark the onslaught. On December 17, he had 20 points and seven assists in a 100–90 win over Melbourne United.

By January, Beal's form was on the decline, culminating in him finishing with no points and no assists in the Bullets' heavy loss to the 36ers on January 19. As a result, the Bullets released Beal from his contract two days later. Bullets coach Andrej Lemanis said parting ways with Beal was "in the best interests of the team, both in terms of winning games this season and building for the future". He was touted as the big-game gunner that would lift the Bullets in key moments, but instead had disappearing acts in Brisbane losses. In nine wins, he averaged 13.7 points, while in 14 losses, he averaged 9.6 points per game. In total, Beal averaged 11.2 points, 2.5 rebounds and 2.1 assists while shooting just 31% from three-point range.

=== Ironi Nes Ziona (2017) ===
On February 17, 2017, Beal signed with Ironi Nes Ziona of the Israeli National League for the rest of the 2016–17 season. Ironi finished the regular season in fourth place with a 16–10 record. They made it through to the finals series with a 2–0 victory over Hapoel Ramat Gan Givatayim in the quarter-finals, and a 3–1 victory over Maccabi Hod HaSharon in the semi-finals. In May 2017, Ironi Nes Ziona defeated Hapoel Be'er Sheva with a 3–0 sweep in the finals series to claim the National League championship, with Beal scoring a season-high 25 points in game one of the series. He scored five points in the title-clinching 72–68 win in game three. In 16 games, he averaged 14.4 points, 3.8 rebounds and 3.5 assists per game.

On September 18, 2017, Beal signed a one-month contract with Ironi Nes Ziona, now in the Israeli Premier League, as injury cover for Daequan Cook. Beal appeared in the first two games of the season before leaving the team in mid-October following Cook's return.

== Post-playing career ==
In January 2018, Beal was a midseason addition to the staff of the Pittsburgh Panthers men's basketball team. He was hired by coach Kevin Stallings as an assistant video coordinator. Beal played for Stallings in all four years of his college career at Vanderbilt. Pitt finished the 2017–18 season 8–24 overall and 0–18 in ACC play, which led to the firing of Stallings in March 2018.

In June 2022, Beal joined the Waxahachie High School athletics staff as head junior varsity coach and a varsity assistant coach with the Runnin' Indians. During his time at Waxahachie, he was a geography teacher.

== Personal life ==
Beal is the son of James and Rubye Beal, and has an older brother James Jr, and a younger brother Jared. He is commonly referred to by the nickname "Dolla", and traditionally wore the number zero jersey.
