= 1988 NBL season =

- League: National Basketball League
- Sport: Basketball
- Duration: 12 February – 9 July 1988 (Regular Season); 14 – 24 July 1988 (Elimination/Semi-finals); 30 July – 7 August 1988 (Grand Finals)
- Teams: 13
- TV partner: Seven Network

Regular season
- Season champions: Adelaide 36ers
- Season MVP: Joe Hurst (Hobart)
- Top scorer: Andrew Gaze (Melbourne)

Finals
- Champions: Canberra Cannons (3rd title)
- Runners-up: North Melbourne Giants
- Finals MVP: Phil Smyth (Canberra)

NBL seasons
- ← 1987 1989 →

The 1988 NBL season was the tenth season of competition since its establishment in 1979. A total of 13 teams contested the league.

== Clubs ==
Following the merger of the Sydney Supersonics and West Sydney Westars to form the Sydney Kings, the NBL had 13 clubs spread across all Australian states and territories with the exception of the Northern Territory.

Club	Location	Home Venue	Capacity	Founded	Head coach
Adelaide 36ers	Adelaide, South Australia	Apollo Stadium	3,000	1982	(United States) Gary Fox
Brisbane Bullets	Brisbane, Queensland	Brisbane Entertainment Centre	13,500	1979	(Australia) Brian Kerle
Canberra Cannons	Canberra, Australian Capital Territory	AIS Arena	5,200	1979	(Australia) Jerry Lee
Eastside Spectres	(Victoria (state)) Melbourne, Victoria	Burwood Stadium	2,000	1979	(United States) Brian Goorjian
Geelong Supercats	(Victoria (state)) Geelong, Victoria	Geelong Arena	2,000	1982	(United States) Pete Mathieson
Hobart Tassie Devils	Hobart, Tasmania	Kingborough Sports Centre	1,800	1983	
Illawarra Hawks	Wollongong, New South Wales	Illawarra Basketball Stadium	2,000	1979	(Australia) Dave Lindstrom
Melbourne Tigers	(Victoria (state)) Melbourne, Victoria	The Glass House	7,200	1931	(Australia) Lindsay Gaze
Newcastle Falcons	Newcastle, New South Wales	Broadmeadow Basketball Stadium	2,200	1979	(Australia) Ken Cole
North Melbourne Giants	(Victoria (state)) Melbourne, Victoria	The Glass House	7,200	1980	(United States) Bruce Palmer
Perth Wildcats	Perth, Western Australia	Perth Superdome	4,500	1982	(United States) Cal Bruton
Sydney Kings	Sydney, New South Wales	State Sports Centre	5,006	1988	(United States) Claude Williams
Westside Saints	(Victoria (state)) Melbourne, Victoria	Keilor Stadium	2,000	1979	(Australia) Andris Blicavs

== Regular season ==
The 1988 regular season took place over 21 rounds between 12 February 1988 and 9 July 1988.

=== Round 1 ===
Date	Home	Score	Away	Venue	Crowd	Box Score
12/02/1988	Illawarra Hawks	97–98	North Melbourne Giants	Beaton Park Stadium	N/A	boxscore
12/02/1988	Sydney Kings	110–106	Geelong Supercats	State Sports Centre	N/A	boxscore
12/02/1988	Hobart Tassie Devils	98–94	Melbourne Tigers	Kingsborough Sports Centre	N/A	boxscore
13/02/1988	Perth Wildcats	101–98	Adelaide 36ers	Challenge Stadium	N/A	boxscore
13/02/1988	Canberra Cannons	120–109	North Melbourne Giants	AIS Arena	N/A	boxscore
13/02/1988	Newcastle Falcons	127–107	Eastside Spectres	Newcastle Sports Entertainment Centre	N/A	boxscore
13/02/1988	Brisbane Bullets	149–85	Geelong Supercats	Brisbane Entertainment Centre	N/A	boxscore
13/02/1988	Westside Saints	106–102	Melbourne Tigers	Keilor Stadium	N/A	boxscore

=== Round 2 ===
Date	Home	Score	Away	Venue	Crowd	Box Score
19/02/1988	Sydney Kings	103–95	Illawarra Hawks	State Sports Centre	N/A	boxscore
19/02/1988	Hobart Tassie Devils	99–97	Eastside Spectres	Kingsborough Sports Centre	N/A	boxscore
20/02/1988	Newcastle Falcons	118–148	Adelaide 36ers	Newcastle Sports Entertainment Centre	N/A	boxscore
20/02/1988	Brisbane Bullets	91–79	Illawarra Hawks	Brisbane Entertainment Centre	N/A	boxscore
20/02/1988	Westside Saints	118–129	Perth Wildcats	Keilor Stadium	N/A	boxscore
20/02/1988	Geelong Supercats	117–144	North Melbourne Giants	Geelong Arena	N/A	boxscore
21/02/1988	Melbourne Tigers	96–118	Perth Wildcats	Albert Park Basketball Stadium	N/A	boxscore

=== Round 3 ===
Date	Home	Score	Away	Venue	Crowd	Box Score
26/02/1988	Adelaide 36ers	109–98	Sydney Kings	Apollo Entertainment Centre	N/A	boxscore
26/02/1988	Hobart Tassie Devils	102–95	Canberra Cannons	Kingsborough Sports Centre	N/A	boxscore
26/02/1988	North Melbourne Giants	131–121	Newcastle Falcons	Melbourne Sports and Entertainment Centre	N/A	boxscore
27/02/1988	Perth Wildcats	104–100	Sydney Kings	Challenge Stadium	N/A	boxscore
27/02/1988	Westside Saints	116–93	Brisbane Bullets	Keilor Stadium	N/A	boxscore
27/02/1988	Eastside Spectres	105–113	Canberra Cannons	Melbourne Sports and Entertainment Centre	N/A	boxscore
27/02/1988	Geelong Supercats	114–135	Newcastle Falcons	Geelong Arena	N/A	boxscore
28/02/1988	Melbourne Tigers	97–91	Brisbane Bullets	Melbourne Sports and Entertainment Centre	N/A	boxscore

=== Round 4 ===
Date	Home	Score	Away	Venue	Crowd	Box Score
4/03/1988	Illawarra Hawks	100–98	Westside Saints	Beaton Park Stadium	N/A	boxscore
4/03/1988	Sydney Kings	98–94	Eastside Spectres	State Sports Centre	N/A	boxscore
4/03/1988	North Melbourne Giants	121–96	Perth Wildcats	Melbourne Sports and Entertainment Centre	N/A	boxscore
5/03/1988	Newcastle Falcons	146–123	Canberra Cannons	Newcastle Sports Entertainment Centre	N/A	boxscore
5/03/1988	Westside Saints	104–88	Hobart Tassie Devils	Keilor Stadium	N/A	boxscore
5/03/1988	Geelong Supercats	97–125	Perth Wildcats	Geelong Arena	N/A	boxscore
6/03/1988	Melbourne Tigers	84–97	Hobart Tassie Devils	Melbourne Sports and Entertainment Centre	N/A	boxscore

=== Round 5 ===
Date	Home	Score	Away	Venue	Crowd	Box Score
11/03/1988	Adelaide 36ers	118–85	Eastside Spectres	Apollo Entertainment Centre	N/A	boxscore
11/03/1988	Canberra Cannons	147–85	Geelong Supercats	AIS Arena	N/A	boxscore
11/03/1988	Hobart Tassie Devils	77–82	Brisbane Bullets	Kingsborough Sports Centre	N/A	boxscore
12/03/1988	Perth Wildcats	109–92	Eastside Spectres	Challenge Stadium	N/A	boxscore
12/03/1988	Illawarra Hawks	110–84	Geelong Supercats	Beaton Park Stadium	N/A	boxscore
12/03/1988	Newcastle Falcons	118–127	Sydney Kings	Newcastle Sports Entertainment Centre	N/A	boxscore
12/03/1988	Westside Saints	98–114	North Melbourne Giants	Keilor Stadium	N/A	boxscore
13/03/1988	Melbourne Tigers	119–121	North Melbourne Giants	Melbourne Sports and Entertainment Centre	N/A	boxscore

=== Round 6 ===
Date	Home	Score	Away	Venue	Crowd	Box Score
18/03/1988	Perth Wildcats	97–89	Illawarra Hawks	Challenge Stadium	N/A	boxscore
18/03/1988	Canberra Cannons	108–100	Westside Saints	AIS Arena	N/A	boxscore
18/03/1988	Sydney Kings	95–111	Melbourne Tigers	State Sports Centre	N/A	boxscore
18/03/1988	North Melbourne Giants	132–137	Brisbane Bullets	Melbourne Sports and Entertainment Centre	N/A	boxscore
19/03/1988	Adelaide 36ers	112–81	Illawarra Hawks	Apollo Entertainment Centre	N/A	boxscore
19/03/1988	Newcastle Falcons	130–117	Melbourne Tigers	Newcastle Sports Entertainment Centre	N/A	boxscore
19/03/1988	Eastside Spectres	111–96	Westside Saints	Melbourne Sports and Entertainment Centre	N/A	boxscore
19/03/1988	Geelong Supercats	91–99	Brisbane Bullets	Geelong Arena	N/A	boxscore

=== Round 7 ===
Date	Home	Score	Away	Venue	Crowd	Box Score
24/03/1988	Eastside Spectres	122–99	Geelong Supercats	Melbourne Sports and Entertainment Centre	N/A	boxscore
25/03/1988	Newcastle Falcons	119–117	Perth Wildcats	Newcastle Sports Entertainment Centre	N/A	boxscore
25/03/1988	Hobart Tassie Devils	107–85	Geelong Supercats	Kingsborough Sports Centre	N/A	boxscore
25/03/1988	North Melbourne Giants	141–106	Melbourne Tigers	Melbourne Sports and Entertainment Centre	N/A	boxscore
26/03/1988	Illawarra Hawks	116–125	Canberra Cannons	Beaton Park Stadium	N/A	boxscore
26/03/1988	Sydney Kings	120–105	Newcastle Falcons	State Sports Centre	N/A	boxscore
26/03/1988	Brisbane Bullets	101–91	Perth Wildcats	Brisbane Entertainment Centre	N/A	boxscore
26/03/1988	Westside Saints	111–128	Adelaide 36ers	Keilor Stadium	N/A	boxscore
27/03/1988	Melbourne Tigers	109–106	Adelaide 36ers	Albert Park Basketball Stadium	N/A	boxscore

=== Round 8 ===
Date	Home	Score	Away	Venue	Crowd	Box Score
8/04/1988	Perth Wildcats	134–131	North Melbourne Giants	Challenge Stadium	N/A	boxscore
8/04/1988	Canberra Cannons	131–100	Sydney Kings	AIS Arena	N/A	boxscore
8/04/1988	Brisbane Bullets	124–107	Newcastle Falcons	Brisbane Entertainment Centre	N/A	boxscore
8/04/1988	Hobart Tassie Devils	94–80	Westside Saints	Kingsborough Sports Centre	N/A	boxscore
9/04/1988	Adelaide 36ers	103–114	North Melbourne Giants	Apollo Entertainment Centre	N/A	boxscore
9/04/1988	Eastside Spectres	82–88	Brisbane Bullets	Melbourne Sports and Entertainment Centre	N/A	boxscore
9/04/1988	Geelong Supercats	84–105	Illawarra Hawks	Geelong Arena	N/A	boxscore

=== Round 9 ===
Date	Home	Score	Away	Venue	Crowd	Box Score
15/04/1988	Adelaide 36ers	110–85	Canberra Cannons	Apollo Entertainment Centre	N/A	boxscore
15/04/1988	Brisbane Bullets	111–100	Hobart Tassie Devils	Brisbane Entertainment Centre	N/A	boxscore
15/04/1988	North Melbourne Giants	127–128	Eastside Spectres	Melbourne Sports and Entertainment Centre	N/A	boxscore
16/04/1988	Perth Wildcats	136–130	Canberra Cannons	Challenge Stadium	N/A	boxscore
16/04/1988	Newcastle Falcons	106–131	Illawarra Hawks	Newcastle Sports Entertainment Centre	N/A	boxscore
16/04/1988	Sydney Kings	103–97	Hobart Tassie Devils	State Sports Centre	N/A	boxscore
16/04/1988	Westside Saints	115–95	Eastside Spectres	Keilor Stadium	N/A	boxscore
16/04/1988	Geelong Supercats	100–125	Melbourne Tigers	Geelong Arena	N/A	boxscore

=== Round 11 ===
Date	Home	Score	Away	Venue	Crowd	Box Score
29/04/1988	Perth Wildcats	113–125	Brisbane Bullets	Challenge Stadium	N/A	boxscore
29/04/1988	Illawarra Hawks	116–79	Hobart Tassie Devils	Beaton Park Stadium	N/A	boxscore
30/04/1988	Adelaide 36ers	108–97	Brisbane Bullets	Apollo Entertainment Centre	N/A	boxscore
30/04/1988	Canberra Cannons	120–102	Hobart Tassie Devils	AIS Arena	N/A	boxscore
30/04/1988	Newcastle Falcons	138–118	Westside Saints	Newcastle Sports Entertainment Centre	N/A	boxscore
30/04/1988	Sydney Kings	124–125	North Melbourne Giants	State Sports Centre	N/A	boxscore
30/04/1988	Geelong Supercats	77–121	Eastside Spectres	Geelong Arena	N/A	boxscore
1/05/1988	Melbourne Tigers	89–99	Eastside Spectres	Albert Park Basketball Stadium	N/A	boxscore

=== Round 12 ===
Date	Home	Score	Away	Venue	Crowd	Box Score
6/05/1988	Newcastle Falcons	141–130	North Melbourne Giants	Newcastle Sports Entertainment Centre	N/A	boxscore
6/05/1988	Hobart Tassie Devils	80–94	Adelaide 36ers	Kingsborough Sports Centre	N/A	boxscore
7/05/1988	Canberra Cannons	84–88	Illawarra Hawks	AIS Arena	N/A	boxscore
7/05/1988	Sydney Kings	98–112	Adelaide 36ers	State Sports Centre	N/A	boxscore
7/05/1988	Brisbane Bullets	114–128	North Melbourne Giants	Brisbane Entertainment Centre	N/A	boxscore
7/05/1988	Westside Saints	130–93	Geelong Supercats	Keilor Stadium	N/A	boxscore
7/05/1988	Eastside Spectres	112–101	Perth Wildcats	Melbourne Sports and Entertainment Centre	N/A	boxscore
8/05/1988	Melbourne Tigers	114–110	Geelong Supercats	Melbourne Sports and Entertainment Centre	N/A	boxscore

=== Round 13 ===
Date	Home	Score	Away	Venue	Crowd	Box Score
13/05/1988	Adelaide 36ers	122–101	Newcastle Falcons	Apollo Entertainment Centre	N/A	boxscore
13/05/1988	North Melbourne Giants	114–98	Hobart Tassie Devils	Melbourne Sports and Entertainment Centre	N/A	boxscore
14/05/1988	Perth Wildcats	114–121	Newcastle Falcons	Challenge Stadium	N/A	boxscore
14/05/1988	Illawarra Hawks	102–100	Sydney Kings	Beaton Park Stadium	N/A	boxscore
14/05/1988	Brisbane Bullets	112–105	Eastside Spectres	Brisbane Entertainment Centre	N/A	boxscore
14/05/1988	Westside Saints	118–125	Canberra Cannons	Keilor Stadium	N/A	boxscore
14/05/1988	Geelong Supercats	89–91	Hobart Tassie Devils	Geelong Arena	N/A	boxscore
15/05/1988	Melbourne Tigers	114–117	Canberra Cannons	Melbourne Sports and Entertainment Centre	N/A	boxscore

=== Round 14 ===
Date	Home	Score	Away	Venue	Crowd	Box Score
20/05/1988	Perth Wildcats	133–103	Melbourne Tigers	Challenge Stadium	N/A	boxscore
20/05/1988	Illawarra Hawks	97–99	Brisbane Bullets	Beaton Park Stadium	N/A	boxscore
20/05/1988	North Melbourne Giants	121–106	Sydney Kings	Melbourne Sports and Entertainment Centre	N/A	boxscore
20/05/1988	Hobart Tassie Devils	103–110	Newcastle Falcons	Kingsborough Sports Centre	N/A	boxscore
21/05/1988	Adelaide 36ers	115–101	Melbourne Tigers	Apollo Entertainment Centre	N/A	boxscore
21/05/1988	Canberra Cannons	97–113	Brisbane Bullets	AIS Arena	N/A	boxscore
21/05/1988	Eastside Spectres	95–97	Hobart Tassie Devils	Melbourne Sports and Entertainment Centre	N/A	boxscore
21/05/1988	Geelong Supercats	92–106	Sydney Kings	Geelong Arena	N/A	boxscore

=== Round 15 ===
Date	Home	Score	Away	Venue	Crowd	Box Score
27/05/1988	Adelaide 36ers	135–113	Westside Saints	Apollo Entertainment Centre	N/A	boxscore
27/05/1988	Canberra Cannons	105–107	Eastside Spectres	AIS Arena	N/A	boxscore
27/05/1988	Sydney Kings	93–125	Brisbane Bullets	State Sports Centre	N/A	boxscore
27/05/1988	Hobart Tassie Devils	100–102	North Melbourne Giants	Kingsborough Sports Centre	N/A	boxscore
28/05/1988	Perth Wildcats	105–120	Westside Saints	Challenge Stadium	N/A	boxscore
28/05/1988	Illawarra Hawks	93–82	Eastside Spectres	Beaton Park Stadium	N/A	boxscore
28/05/1988	Newcastle Falcons	151–106	Geelong Supercats	Newcastle Sports Entertainment Centre	N/A	boxscore
28/05/1988	Brisbane Bullets	112–108	Melbourne Tigers	Brisbane Entertainment Centre	N/A	boxscore

=== Round 16 ===
Date	Home	Score	Away	Venue	Crowd	Box Score
3/06/1988	Brisbane Bullets	89–90	Adelaide 36ers	Brisbane Entertainment Centre	N/A	boxscore
3/06/1988	Hobart Tassie Devils	95–87	Perth Wildcats	Kingsborough Sports Centre	N/A	boxscore
3/06/1988	North Melbourne Giants	113–112	Canberra Cannons	Melbourne Sports and Entertainment Centre	N/A	boxscore
4/06/1988	Sydney Kings	106–88	Perth Wildcats	State Sports Centre	N/A	boxscore
4/06/1988	Westside Saints	108–122	Illawarra Hawks	Keilor Stadium	N/A	boxscore
4/06/1988	Eastside Spectres	107–100	Adelaide 36ers	Melbourne Sports and Entertainment Centre	N/A	boxscore
4/06/1988	Geelong Supercats	88–107	Canberra Cannons	Geelong Arena	N/A	boxscore
5/06/1988	Melbourne Tigers	110–107	Illawarra Hawks	Melbourne Sports and Entertainment Centre	N/A	boxscore

=== Round 17 ===
Date	Home	Score	Away	Venue	Crowd	Box Score
10/06/1988	Adelaide 36ers	145–113	Geelong Supercats	Apollo Entertainment Centre	N/A	boxscore
10/06/1988	Canberra Cannons	110–95	Newcastle Falcons	AIS Arena	N/A	boxscore
10/06/1988	Hobart Tassie Devils	117–99	Sydney Kings	Kingsborough Sports Centre	N/A	boxscore
10/06/1988	North Melbourne Giants	125–109	Illawarra Hawks	Melbourne Sports and Entertainment Centre	N/A	boxscore
11/06/1988	Perth Wildcats	139–75	Geelong Supercats	Challenge Stadium	N/A	boxscore
11/06/1988	Illawarra Hawks	116–101	Newcastle Falcons	Beaton Park Stadium	N/A	boxscore
11/06/1988	Eastside Spectres	101–92	Sydney Kings	Melbourne Sports and Entertainment Centre	N/A	boxscore
13/06/1988	Melbourne Tigers	96–99	Westside Saints	Albert Park Basketball Stadium	N/A	boxscore

=== Round 18 ===
Date	Home	Score	Away	Venue	Crowd	Box Score
17/06/1988	Illawarra Hawks	100–117	Perth Wildcats	Beaton Park Stadium	N/A	boxscore
17/06/1988	North Melbourne Giants	103–117	Adelaide 36ers	Melbourne Sports and Entertainment Centre	N/A	boxscore
18/06/1988	Canberra Cannons	103–86	Perth Wildcats	AIS Arena	N/A	boxscore
18/06/1988	Newcastle Falcons	100–113	Brisbane Bullets	Newcastle Sports Entertainment Centre	N/A	boxscore
18/06/1988	Westside Saints	102–88	Sydney Kings	Keilor Stadium	N/A	boxscore
18/06/1988	Eastside Spectres	118–121	Melbourne Tigers	Melbourne Sports and Entertainment Centre	N/A	boxscore
18/06/1988	Geelong Supercats	105–126	Adelaide 36ers	Geelong Arena	N/A	boxscore

=== Round 19 ===
Date	Home	Score	Away	Venue	Crowd	Box Score
24/06/1988	Illawarra Hawks	93–100	Adelaide 36ers	Beaton Park Stadium	N/A	boxscore
24/06/1988	Sydney Kings	89–82	Westside Saints	State Sports Centre	N/A	boxscore
25/06/1988	Canberra Cannons	99–84	Adelaide 36ers	AIS Arena	N/A	boxscore
25/06/1988	Newcastle Falcons	99–95	Hobart Tassie Devils	Newcastle Sports Entertainment Centre	N/A	boxscore
25/06/1988	Brisbane Bullets	106–100	Westside Saints	Brisbane Entertainment Centre	N/A	boxscore
25/06/1988	Eastside Spectres	108–117	North Melbourne Giants	Melbourne Sports and Entertainment Centre	N/A	boxscore
26/06/1988	Melbourne Tigers	90–94	Sydney Kings	Melbourne Sports and Entertainment Centre	N/A	boxscore

=== Round 20 ===
Date	Home	Score	Away	Venue	Crowd	Box Score
1/07/1988	Sydney Kings	89–92	Canberra Cannons	State Sports Centre	N/A	boxscore
1/07/1988	Hobart Tassie Devils	83–98	Illawarra Hawks	Kingsborough Sports Centre	N/A	boxscore
1/07/1988	North Melbourne Giants	140–104	Geelong Supercats	Melbourne Sports and Entertainment Centre	N/A	boxscore
2/07/1988	Adelaide 36ers	122–99	Perth Wildcats	Apollo Entertainment Centre	N/A	boxscore
2/07/1988	Brisbane Bullets	97–105	Canberra Cannons	Brisbane Entertainment Centre	N/A	boxscore
2/07/1988	Westside Saints	104–129	Newcastle Falcons	Keilor Stadium	N/A	boxscore
2/07/1988	Eastside Spectres	101–99	Illawarra Hawks	Melbourne Sports and Entertainment Centre	N/A	boxscore
3/07/1988	Melbourne Tigers	121–124	Newcastle Falcons	Albert Park Basketball Stadium	N/A	boxscore

=== Round 21 ===
Date	Home	Score	Away	Venue	Crowd	Box Score
8/07/1988	Perth Wildcats	114–99	Hobart Tassie Devils	Challenge Stadium	N/A	boxscore
8/07/1988	Illawarra Hawks	112–123	Melbourne Tigers	Beaton Park Stadium	N/A	boxscore
8/07/1988	North Melbourne Giants	102–88	Westside Saints	Melbourne Sports and Entertainment Centre	N/A	boxscore
9/07/1988	Adelaide 36ers	142–100	Hobart Tassie Devils	Apollo Entertainment Centre	N/A	boxscore
9/07/1988	Canberra Cannons	138–112	Melbourne Tigers	AIS Arena	N/A	boxscore
9/07/1988	Brisbane Bullets	135–122	Sydney Kings	Brisbane Entertainment Centre	N/A	boxscore
9/07/1988	Eastside Spectres	121–108	Newcastle Falcons	Melbourne Sports and Entertainment Centre	N/A	boxscore
9/07/1988	Geelong Supercats	99–110	Westside Saints	Geelong Arena	N/A	boxscore

== Ladder ==
This is the ladder at the end of season, before the finals. The top 6 teams qualified for the finals series.

Pos	1988 NBL season											
Pos	Team	Pld	W	L	PCT	Last 5	Streak	Home	Away	PF	PA	PP
1	Adelaide 36ers	24	19	5	79.17%	4–1	W2	11–1	8–4	2744	2400	114.33%
2	North Melbourne Giants^{1}	24	18	6	75.00%	4–1	W3	9–3	9–3	2903	2697	107.64%
3	Brisbane Bullets^{1}	24	18	6	75.00%	3–2	W1	9–3	9–3	2603	2423	107.43%
4	Canberra Cannons	24	16	8	66.67%	5–0	W7	9–3	7–5	2691	2515	107.00%
5	Newcastle Falcons^{2}	24	13	11	54.17%	3–2	L1	8–4	5–7	2850	2832	100.64%
6	Perth Wildcats^{2}	24	13	11	54.17%	3–2	W1	9–3	4–8	2653	2573	103.11%
7	Illawarra Hawks^{3}	24	11	13	45.83%	1–4	L2	6–6	5–7	2455	2410	101.87%
8	Eastside Spectres^{3}	24	11	13	45.83%	3–2	W2	7–5	4–8	2495	2500	99.80%
9	Hobart Tassie Devils^{4}	24	10	14	41.67%	1–4	L4	7–5	3–9	2298	2414	95.19%
10	Sydney Kings^{4}	24	10	14	41.67%	2–3	L2	7–5	3–9	2460	2554	96.32%
11	Westside Saints	24	9	15	37.50%	1–4	W1	6–6	3–9	2534	2589	97.88%
12	Melbourne Tigers	24	8	16	33.33%	2–3	L1	4–8	4–8	2562	2681	95.56%
13	Geelong Supercats	24	0	24	00.00%	0–5	L24	0–12	0–12	2298	2958	77.69%

Updated to match(es) played on 9 July 1988. Source: NBL.com.au

The NBL tie-breaker system as outlined in the NBL Rules and Regulations states that in the case of an identical win–loss record, the results in games played between the teams will determine order of seeding.

^{1}Head-to-Head between North Melbourne Giants and Brisbane Bullets (1-1). North Melbourne Giants won For and Against (+9).

^{2}Newcastle Falcons won Head-to-Head (2-0).

^{3}Head-to-Head between Illawarra Hawks and Eastside Spectres (1-1). Illawarra Hawks won For and Against (+9).

^{4}Head-to-Head between Hobart Tassie Devils and Sydney Kings (1-1). Hobart Tassie Devils won For and Against (+12).

== Finals ==
=== Playoff bracket ===
Elimination Finals
4	Canberra Cannons	107
5	Newcastle Falcons	92
3	Brisbane Bullets	98
6	Perth Wildcats	113

Semifinals
1	Adelaide 36ers	91	95	X
4	Canberra Cannons	100	100	X
2	North Melbourne Giants	105	137	134
6	Perth Wildcats	108	113	111

Grand Final
2	North Melbourne Giants	95	117	101
4	Canberra Cannons	120	101	108

=== Elimination Finals ===
Both matches were single game elimination contests. The team that qualified 3rd at the end of the regular season would host the team that finished 6th, with the team finishing 4th hosting the team placed 5th. The teams that finished the regular season 1st and 2nd had a bye into the semi-final stage.

Date	Home	Score	Away	Venue	Crowd	Box Score
14/07/1988	Canberra Cannons	107–92	Newcastle Falcons	AIS Arena	N/A	boxscore
16/07/1988	Brisbane Bullets	98–113	Perth Wildcats	Brisbane Entertainment Centre	N/A	boxscore

=== Semifinals ===
Each were played as a best of 3-game series

Date	Home	Score	Away	Venue	Crowd	Box Score
19/07/1988	Canberra Cannons	100–91	Adelaide 36ers	AIS Arena	N/A	boxscore
20/07/1988	Perth Wildcats	108–105	North Melbourne Giants	Challenge Stadium	N/A	boxscore
22/07/1988	Adelaide 36ers	95–100	Canberra Cannons	Apollo Entertainment Centre	N/A	boxscore
22/07/1988	North Melbourne Giants	137–113	Perth Wildcats	Melbourne Sports and Entertainment Centre	N/A	boxscore
24/07/1988	North Melbourne Giants	134–111	Perth Wildcats	Melbourne Sports and Entertainment Centre	N/A	boxscore

=== Grand Final ===
Date	Home	Score	Away	Venue	Crowd	Box Score
30/07/1988	Canberra Cannons	120–95	North Melbourne Giants	AIS Arena	N/A	boxscore
5/08/1988	North Melbourne Giants	117–101	Canberra Cannons	Melbourne Sports and Entertainment Centre	N/A	boxscore
7/08/1988	North Melbourne Giants	101–108	Canberra Cannons	Melbourne Sports and Entertainment Centre	N/A	boxscore

== 1988 NBL statistics leaders ==
Category	Player	Team	Stat
Points per game	Andrew Gaze	Melbourne Tigers	36.9
Rebounds per game	Dean Uthoff	Eastside Melbourne Spectres	17.2
Assists per game	Brendan Joyce	Westside Melbourne Saints	7.9
Steals per game	Jerry Dennard	Hobart Tassie Devils	2.8
Blocks per game	Willie Simmons	Canberra Cannons	3.6
Free throw percentage	Leroy Loggins	Brisbane Bullets	85.6%

== NBL awards ==
- Most Valuable Player: Joe Hurst, Hobart Tassie Devils
- Most Valuable Player Grand Final: Phil Smyth, Canberra Cannons
- Rookie of the Year: Shane Heal, Brisbane Bullets
- Coach of the Year: Bruce Palmer, North Melbourne Giants

== All NBL Team ==
#	Player	Team
PG	Phil Smyth	Canberra Cannons
SG	Andrew Gaze	Melbourne Tigers
SF	Leroy Loggins	Brisbane Bullets
PF	Mark Davis	Adelaide 36ers
C	Tim Dillon	North Melbourne Giants
