= 1987 NBL season =

- League: National Basketball League
- Sport: Basketball
- Duration: 24 April – 27 September 1987; 30 September – 4 October 1987 (Semi-finals); 10 – 16 October 1987 (Grand Finals)
- Teams: 14
- TV partner(s): ABC, ATN7, BTQ7, STW9, SAS10

Regular season
- Season champions: Adelaide 36ers
- Season MVP: Mark Davis (Adelaide); Leroy Loggins (Brisbane)
- Top scorer: Paul Stanley (Hobart)

Finals
- Champions: Brisbane Bullets (2nd title)
- Runners-up: Perth Wildcats
- Finals MVP: Leroy Loggins (Brisbane)

NBL seasons
- ← 1986 1988 →

The 1987 NBL season was the ninth season of competition since its establishment in 1979. A total of 14 teams contested the league. Three of the Melbourne-based clubs rebranded themselves in the off season, with the Nundawading Spectres renaming themselves to Eastside Spectres, Coburg Giants became North Melbourne Giants and the St. Kilda Saints became Westside Saints.

== Clubs ==
The NBL had 14 clubs spread across all Australian states and territories with the exception of the Northern Territory.

Club	Location	Home Venue	Capacity	Founded	Head coach
Adelaide 36ers	Adelaide, South Australia	Apollo Stadium	3,000	1982	(United States) Gary Fox
Brisbane Bullets	Brisbane, Queensland	Brisbane Entertainment Centre	13,500	1979	(Australia) Brian Kerle
Canberra Cannons	Canberra, Australian Capital Territory	AIS Arena	5,200	1979	(Australia) Jerry Lee
Eastside Spectres	(Victoria (state)) Melbourne, Victoria	Burwood Stadium	2,000	1979	(Australia) Barry Barnes
Geelong Cats	(Victoria (state)) Geelong, Victoria	Geelong Arena	2,000	1982	(Australia) Ken Richardson
Hobart Tassie Devils	Hobart, Tasmania	Kingborough Sports Centre	1,800	1983	(United States) David Adkins
Illawarra Hawks	Wollongong, New South Wales	Illawarra Basketball Stadium	2,000	1979	(Australia) Dave Lindstrom
Melbourne Tigers	(Victoria (state)) Melbourne, Victoria	Albert Park Basketball Stadium	2,000	1931	(Australia) Lindsay Gaze
Newcastle Falcons	Newcastle, New South Wales	Broadmeadow Basketball Stadium	2,200	1979	(Australia) Steve Johansen
North Melbourne Giants	(Victoria (state)) Melbourne, Victoria	The Glass House	7,200	1980	(United States) Bruce Palmer
Perth Wildcats	Perth, Western Australia	Perth Superdome	4,500	1982	(United States) Cal Bruton
Sydney Supersonics	Sydney, New South Wales	State Sports Centre	5,006	1982	(Australia) Ken Cole
Westside Saints	(Victoria (state)) Melbourne, Victoria	Keilor Stadium	2,000	1979	(Australia) Andris Blicavs
West Sydney Westars	Sydney, New South Wales	State Sports Centre	5,006	1982	(Australia) Mike Osbourne

== Regular season ==
The 1987 regular season took place over 22 rounds between 24 April 1987 and 20 September 1987.

=== Round 1 ===
Date	Home	Score	Away	Venue	Crowd	Box Score
24/04/1987	Adelaide 36ers	131–105	Westside Saints	Apollo Entertainment Centre	N/A	boxscore
24/04/1987	Canberra Cannons	123–111	Melbourne Tigers	AIS Arena	N/A	boxscore
24/04/1987	West Sydney Westars	83–97	Brisbane Bullets	State Sports Centre	N/A	boxscore
24/04/1987	Newcastle Falcons	96–117	Eastside Spectres	Newcastle Sports Entertainment Centre	N/A	boxscore
24/04/1987	North Melbourne Giants	116–110	Hobart Tassie Devils	Ken Watson Stadium	N/A	boxscore
25/04/1987	Perth Wildcats	133–111	Westside Saints	Perry Lakes Basketball Stadium	N/A	boxscore
25/04/1987	Illawarra Hawks	122–101	Melbourne Tigers	Beaton Park Stadium	N/A	boxscore
25/04/1987	Sydney SuperSonics	76–98	Eastside Spectres	State Sports Centre	N/A	boxscore
25/04/1987	Geelong Cats	129–118	Hobart Tassie Devils	Geelong Arena	N/A	boxscore

=== Round 2 ===
Date	Home	Score	Away	Venue	Crowd	Box Score
1/05/1987	Adelaide 36ers	103–106	North Melbourne Giants	Apollo Entertainment Centre	N/A	boxscore
1/05/1987	Sydney SuperSonics	104–124	West Sydney Westars	State Sports Centre	N/A	boxscore
1/05/1987	Hobart Tassie Devils	104–87	Geelong Cats	Kingsborough Sports Centre	N/A	boxscore
2/05/1987	Perth Wildcats	134–111	North Melbourne Giants	Challenge Stadium	N/A	boxscore
2/05/1987	Canberra Cannons	78–81	Illawarra Hawks	AIS Arena	N/A	boxscore
2/05/1987	Newcastle Falcons	107–104	West Sydney Westars	Newcastle Sports Entertainment Centre	N/A	boxscore
2/05/1987	Westside Saints	125–87	Geelong Cats	Keilor Stadium	N/A	boxscore
2/05/1987	Eastside Spectres	87–118	Brisbane Bullets	Kilsyth Stadium	N/A	boxscore
3/05/1987	Melbourne Tigers	118–123	Brisbane Bullets	Albert Park Basketball Stadium	N/A	boxscore

=== Round 3 ===
Date	Home	Score	Away	Venue	Crowd	Box Score
8/05/1987	Sydney SuperSonics	116–105	Hobart Tassie Devils	State Sports Centre	N/A	boxscore
8/05/1987	North Melbourne Giants	120–122	Canberra Cannons	Melbourne Sports and Entertainment Centre	N/A	boxscore
9/05/1987	Perth Wildcats	97–101	Adelaide 36ers	Challenge Stadium	N/A	boxscore
9/05/1987	West Sydney Westars	106–111	Illawarra Hawks	State Sports Centre	N/A	boxscore
9/05/1987	Newcastle Falcons	101–104	Hobart Tassie Devils	Newcastle Sports Entertainment Centre	N/A	boxscore
9/05/1987	Geelong Cats	105–107	Canberra Cannons	Geelong Arena	N/A	boxscore
9/05/1987	Eastside Spectres	98–95	Westside Saints	Kilsyth Stadium	N/A	boxscore
10/05/1987	Melbourne Tigers	127–107	Westside Saints	Albert Park Basketball Stadium	N/A	boxscore

=== Round 4 ===
Date	Home	Score	Away	Venue	Crowd	Box Score
15/05/1987	Illawarra Hawks	96–88	Sydney SuperSonics	Beaton Park Stadium	N/A	boxscore
15/05/1987	Hobart Tassie Devils	80–86	Brisbane Bullets	Kingsborough Sports Centre	N/A	boxscore
16/05/1987	Canberra Cannons	113–111	Sydney SuperSonics	AIS Arena	N/A	boxscore
16/05/1987	Geelong Cats	94–89	North Melbourne Giants	Geelong Arena	N/A	boxscore
16/05/1987	Westside Saints	83–121	Brisbane Bullets	Keilor Stadium	N/A	boxscore
16/05/1987	Melbourne Tigers	93–112	West Sydney Westars	Albert Park Basketball Stadium	N/A	boxscore
16/05/1987	Adelaide 36ers	104–106	Perth Wildcats	Apollo Entertainment Centre	N/A	boxscore
17/05/1987	Eastside Spectres	119–101	West Sydney Westars	Keilor Stadium	N/A	boxscore

=== Round 5 ===
Date	Home	Score	Away	Venue	Crowd	Box Score
22/05/1987	West Sydney Westars	92–68	Geelong Cats	State Sports Centre	N/A	boxscore
22/05/1987	Newcastle Falcons	108–116	North Melbourne Giants	Newcastle Sports Entertainment Centre	N/A	boxscore
22/05/1987	Hobart Tassie Devils	113–97	Melbourne Tigers	Kingsborough Sports Centre	N/A	boxscore
23/05/1987	Brisbane Bullets	98–91	Geelong Cats	Brisbane Entertainment Centre	N/A	boxscore
23/05/1987	Sydney SuperSonics	105–98	North Melbourne Giants	State Sports Centre	N/A	boxscore
23/05/1987	Westside Saints	111–107	Melbourne Tigers	Keilor Stadium	N/A	boxscore

=== Round 6 ===
Date	Home	Score	Away	Venue	Crowd	Box Score
29/05/1987	Perth Wildcats	92–82	Brisbane Bullets	Challenge Stadium	N/A	boxscore
29/05/1987	Canberra Cannons	117–100	Newcastle Falcons	AIS Arena	N/A	boxscore
29/05/1987	West Sydney Westars	81–86	Sydney SuperSonics	State Sports Centre	N/A	boxscore
29/05/1987	Hobart Tassie Devils	81–77	North Melbourne Giants	Kingsborough Sports Centre	N/A	boxscore
30/05/1987	Adelaide 36ers	127–111	Brisbane Bullets	Apollo Entertainment Centre	N/A	boxscore
30/05/1987	Illawarra Hawks	106–100	Newcastle Falcons	Beaton Park Stadium	N/A	boxscore
30/05/1987	Westside Saints	105–127	North Melbourne Giants	Keilor Stadium	N/A	boxscore
30/05/1987	Eastside Spectres	88–91	Geelong Cats	Kilsyth Stadium	N/A	boxscore
31/05/1987	Melbourne Tigers	114–101	Geelong Cats	Albert Park Basketball Stadium	N/A	boxscore

=== Round 7 ===
Date	Home	Score	Away	Venue	Crowd	Box Score
5/06/1987	West Sydney Westars	83–91	Hobart Tassie Devils	State Sports Centre	N/A	boxscore
5/06/1987	Brisbane Bullets	92–78	Sydney SuperSonics	Brisbane Entertainment Centre	N/A	boxscore
5/06/1987	Adelaide 36ers	148–122	Newcastle Falcons	Apollo Entertainment Centre	N/A	boxscore
5/06/1987	Illawarra Hawks	92–83	Eastside Spectres	Beaton Park Stadium	N/A	boxscore
5/06/1987	North Melbourne Giants	135–107	Melbourne Tigers	Melbourne Sports and Entertainment Centre	N/A	boxscore
6/06/1987	Perth Wildcats	151–116	Newcastle Falcons	Challenge Stadium	N/A	boxscore
6/06/1987	Canberra Cannons	103–94	Eastside Spectres	AIS Arena	N/A	boxscore
6/06/1987	Westside Saints	82–106	Hobart Tassie Devils	Keilor Stadium	N/A	boxscore
6/06/1987	Sydney SuperSonics	91–114	Geelong Cats	State Sports Centre	N/A	boxscore

=== Round 8 ===
Date	Home	Score	Away	Venue	Crowd	Box Score
12/06/1987	West Sydney Westars	112–119	Perth Wildcats	State Sports Centre	N/A	boxscore
12/06/1987	Newcastle Falcons	82–133	Illawarra Hawks	Newcastle Sports Entertainment Centre	N/A	boxscore
12/06/1987	North Melbourne Giants	120–128	Adelaide 36ers	Melbourne Sports and Entertainment Centre	N/A	boxscore
12/06/1987	Hobart Tassie Devils	86–93	Canberra Cannons	Kingsborough Sports Centre	N/A	boxscore
13/06/1987	Brisbane Bullets	96–95	Perth Wildcats	Brisbane Entertainment Centre	N/A	boxscore
13/06/1987	Sydney SuperSonics	104–90	Illawarra Hawks	State Sports Centre	N/A	boxscore
13/06/1987	Geelong Cats	101–126	Adelaide 36ers	Geelong Arena	N/A	boxscore
13/06/1987	Westside Saints	113–114	Canberra Cannons	Keilor Stadium	N/A	boxscore
13/06/1987	Eastside Spectres	128–110	Melbourne Tigers	Kilsyth Stadium	N/A	boxscore

=== Round 9 ===
Date	Home	Score	Away	Venue	Crowd	Box Score
19/06/1987	Illawarra Hawks	91–79	Brisbane Bullets	Beaton Park Stadium	N/A	boxscore
19/06/1987	North Melbourne Giants	137–101	West Sydney Westars	Melbourne Sports and Entertainment Centre	N/A	boxscore
19/06/1987	Hobart Tassie Devils	109–91	Newcastle Falcons	Kingsborough Sports Centre	N/A	boxscore
19/06/1987	Perth Wildcats	123–93	Eastside Spectres	Challenge Stadium	N/A	boxscore
20/06/1987	Adelaide 36ers	98–87	Eastside Spectres	Apollo Entertainment Centre	N/A	boxscore
20/06/1987	Canberra Cannons	81–72	Brisbane Bullets	AIS Arena	N/A	boxscore
20/06/1987	Geelong Cats	77–83	West Sydney Westars	Geelong Arena	N/A	boxscore
20/06/1987	Westside Saints	117–116	Newcastle Falcons	Keilor Stadium	N/A	boxscore

=== Round 10 ===
Date	Home	Score	Away	Venue	Crowd	Box Score
25/06/1987	Illawarra Hawks	108–90	Adelaide 36ers	Beaton Park Stadium	N/A	boxscore
25/06/1987	West Sydney Westars	100–85	Newcastle Falcons	State Sports Centre	N/A	boxscore
25/06/1987	North Melbourne Giants	146–118	Perth Wildcats	Melbourne Sports and Entertainment Centre	N/A	boxscore
27/06/1987	Canberra Cannons	115–118	Adelaide 36ers	AIS Arena	N/A	boxscore
27/06/1987	Brisbane Bullets	140–117	Newcastle Falcons	Brisbane Entertainment Centre	N/A	boxscore
27/06/1987	Geelong Cats	110–103	Perth Wildcats	Geelong Arena	N/A	boxscore
27/06/1987	Eastside Spectres	95–91	Sydney SuperSonics	Kilsyth Stadium	N/A	boxscore
28/06/1987	Melbourne Tigers	104–121	Sydney SuperSonics	Albert Park Basketball Stadium	N/A	boxscore

=== Round 11 ===
Date	Home	Score	Away	Venue	Crowd	Box Score
3/07/1987	Perth Wildcats	111–100	Illawarra Hawks	Challenge Stadium	N/A	boxscore
3/07/1987	Brisbane Bullets	97–87	Eastside Spectres	Brisbane Entertainment Centre	N/A	boxscore
3/07/1987	Sydney SuperSonics	117–142	Canberra Cannons	State Sports Centre	N/A	boxscore
3/07/1987	Hobart Tassie Devils	102–92	Westside Saints	Kingsborough Sports Centre	N/A	boxscore
4/07/1987	Adelaide 36ers	112–95	Illawarra Hawks	Apollo Entertainment Centre	N/A	boxscore
4/07/1987	West Sydney Westars	73–77	Eastside Spectres	State Sports Centre	N/A	boxscore
4/07/1987	Newcastle Falcons	124–128	Canberra Cannons	Newcastle Sports Entertainment Centre	N/A	boxscore
4/07/1987	Geelong Cats	132–106	Melbourne Tigers	Geelong Arena	N/A	boxscore

=== Round 12 ===
Date	Home	Score	Away	Venue	Crowd	Box Score
10/07/1987	North Melbourne Giants	138–104	Sydney SuperSonics	Melbourne Sports and Entertainment Centre	N/A	boxscore
10/07/1987	Hobart Tassie Devils	85–82	West Sydney Westars	Kingsborough Sports Centre	N/A	boxscore
11/07/1987	Brisbane Bullets	108–85	Illawarra Hawks	Brisbane Entertainment Centre	N/A	boxscore
11/07/1987	Geelong Cats	102–98	Sydney SuperSonics	Geelong Arena	N/A	boxscore
11/07/1987	Westside Saints	87–90	West Sydney Westars	Keilor Stadium	N/A	boxscore
11/07/1987	Melbourne Tigers	127–137	Newcastle Falcons	Albert Park Basketball Stadium	N/A	boxscore
12/07/1987	Eastside Spectres	125–118	Newcastle Falcons	Kilsyth Stadium	N/A	boxscore

=== Round 13 ===
Date	Home	Score	Away	Venue	Crowd	Box Score
17/07/1987	Adelaide 36ers	147–99	West Sydney Westars	Apollo Entertainment Centre	N/A	boxscore
17/07/1987	Canberra Cannons	118–101	Westside Saints	AIS Arena	N/A	boxscore
17/07/1987	Sydney SuperSonics	137–140	Newcastle Falcons	State Sports Centre	N/A	boxscore
17/07/1987	North Melbourne Giants	109–108	Brisbane Bullets	Melbourne Sports and Entertainment Centre	N/A	boxscore
18/07/1987	Perth Wildcats	118–109	West Sydney Westars	Challenge Stadium	N/A	boxscore
18/07/1987	Illawarra Hawks	118–98	Westside Saints	Beaton Park Stadium	N/A	boxscore
18/07/1987	Geelong Cats	101–91	Brisbane Bullets	Geelong Arena	N/A	boxscore
18/07/1987	Eastside Spectres	87–90	Hobart Tassie Devils	Kilsyth Stadium	N/A	boxscore
19/07/1987	Melbourne Tigers	83–110	Hobart Tassie Devils	Albert Park Basketball Stadium	N/A	boxscore

=== Round 14 ===
Date	Home	Score	Away	Venue	Crowd	Box Score
23/07/1987	North Melbourne Giants	130–116	Westside Saints	Melbourne Sports and Entertainment Centre	N/A	boxscore
24/07/1987	Perth Wildcats	103–101	Canberra Cannons	Challenge Stadium	N/A	boxscore
24/07/1987	Brisbane Bullets	103–96	Hobart Tassie Devils	Brisbane Entertainment Centre	N/A	boxscore
25/07/1987	Adelaide 36ers	123–116	Canberra Cannons	Apollo Entertainment Centre	N/A	boxscore
25/07/1987	Newcastle Falcons	99–116	Geelong Cats	Newcastle Sports Entertainment Centre	N/A	boxscore
25/07/1987	Eastside Spectres	89–93	Illawarra Hawks	Kilsyth Stadium	N/A	boxscore
26/07/1987	Melbourne Tigers	98–101	Illawarra Hawks	Albert Park Basketball Stadium	N/A	boxscore

=== Round 15 ===
Date	Home	Score	Away	Venue	Crowd	Box Score
31/07/1987	Perth Wildcats	118–103	Melbourne Tigers	Challenge Stadium	N/A	boxscore
31/07/1987	Canberra Cannons	111–95	West Sydney Westars	AIS Arena	N/A	boxscore
31/07/1987	Sydney SuperSonics	102–104	Brisbane Bullets	State Sports Centre	N/A	boxscore
31/07/1987	North Melbourne Giants	123–99	Geelong Cats	Melbourne Sports and Entertainment Centre	N/A	boxscore
31/07/1987	Hobart Tassie Devils	97–117	Eastside Spectres	Kingsborough Sports Centre	N/A	boxscore
1/08/1987	Adelaide 36ers	133–108	Melbourne Tigers	Apollo Entertainment Centre	N/A	boxscore
1/08/1987	Illawarra Hawks	99–92	West Sydney Westars	Beaton Park Stadium	N/A	boxscore
1/08/1987	Newcastle Falcons	112–121	Brisbane Bullets	Newcastle Sports Entertainment Centre	N/A	boxscore
1/08/1987	Westside Saints	105–123	Eastside Spectres	Keilor Stadium	N/A	boxscore

=== Round 16 ===
Date	Home	Score	Away	Venue	Crowd	Box Score
7/08/1987	Illawarra Hawks	109–105	Geelong Cats	Beaton Park Stadium	N/A	boxscore
7/08/1987	West Sydney Westars	102–141	North Melbourne Giants	State Sports Centre	N/A	boxscore
7/08/1987	Hobart Tassie Devils	95–97	Perth Wildcats	Kingsborough Sports Centre	N/A	boxscore
8/08/1987	Canberra Cannons	96–94	Geelong Cats	AIS Arena	N/A	boxscore
8/08/1987	Brisbane Bullets	105–103	North Melbourne Giants	Brisbane Entertainment Centre	N/A	boxscore
8/08/1987	Newcastle Falcons	119–125	Sydney SuperSonics	Newcastle Sports Entertainment Centre	N/A	boxscore
8/08/1987	Westside Saints	106–123	Perth Wildcats	Keilor Stadium	N/A	boxscore
8/08/1987	Eastside Spectres	94–115	Adelaide 36ers	Kilsyth Stadium	N/A	boxscore
9/08/1987	Melbourne Tigers	99–122	Adelaide 36ers	Albert Park Basketball Stadium	N/A	boxscore

=== Round 17 ===
Date	Home	Score	Away	Venue	Crowd	Box Score
14/08/1987	Illawarra Hawks	106–102	Perth Wildcats	Beaton Park Stadium	N/A	boxscore
14/08/1987	West Sydney Westars	109–86	Melbourne Tigers	State Sports Centre	N/A	boxscore
14/08/1987	Newcastle Falcons	108–126	Adelaide 36ers	Newcastle Sports Entertainment Centre	N/A	boxscore
15/08/1987	Canberra Cannons	91–126	Perth Wildcats	AIS Arena	N/A	boxscore
15/08/1987	Brisbane Bullets	113–62	Melbourne Tigers	Brisbane Entertainment Centre	N/A	boxscore
15/08/1987	Sydney SuperSonics	103–108	Adelaide 36ers	State Sports Centre	N/A	boxscore
15/08/1987	Geelong Cats	98–77	Westside Saints	Geelong Arena	N/A	boxscore

=== Round 18 ===
Date	Home	Score	Away	Venue	Crowd	Box Score
21/08/1987	Perth Wildcats	99–108	Hobart Tassie Devils	Challenge Stadium	N/A	boxscore
21/08/1987	West Sydney Westars	105–110	Westside Saints	State Sports Centre	N/A	boxscore
21/08/1987	Newcastle Falcons	115–81	Melbourne Tigers	Newcastle Sports Entertainment Centre	N/A	boxscore
21/08/1987	North Melbourne Giants	94–95	Eastside Spectres	Melbourne Sports and Entertainment Centre	N/A	boxscore
22/08/1987	Adelaide 36ers	103–87	Hobart Tassie Devils	Apollo Entertainment Centre	N/A	boxscore
22/08/1987	Brisbane Bullets	113–98	Westside Saints	Brisbane Entertainment Centre	N/A	boxscore
22/08/1987	Sydney SuperSonics	129–76	Melbourne Tigers	State Sports Centre	N/A	boxscore
22/08/1987	Geelong Cats	101–91	Eastside Spectres	Geelong Arena	N/A	boxscore
22/08/1987	Illawarra Hawks	109–95	Canberra Cannons	Beaton Park Stadium	N/A	boxscore

=== Round 19 ===
Date	Home	Score	Away	Venue	Crowd	Box Score
28/08/1987	Brisbane Bullets	110–107	Canberra Cannons	Brisbane Entertainment Centre	N/A	boxscore
28/08/1987	Sydney SuperSonics	109–121	Perth Wildcats	State Sports Centre	N/A	boxscore
28/08/1987	North Melbourne Giants	115–111	Illawarra Hawks	Melbourne Sports and Entertainment Centre	N/A	boxscore
28/08/1987	Hobart Tassie Devils	100–93	Adelaide 36ers	Kingsborough Sports Centre	N/A	boxscore
29/08/1987	West Sydney Westars	112–94	Canberra Cannons	State Sports Centre	N/A	boxscore
29/08/1987	Newcastle Falcons	131–112	Perth Wildcats	Newcastle Sports Entertainment Centre	N/A	boxscore
29/08/1987	Geelong Cats	113–109	Illawarra Hawks	Geelong Arena	N/A	boxscore
29/08/1987	Westside Saints	101–104	Adelaide 36ers	Keilor Stadium	N/A	boxscore
29/08/1987	Melbourne Tigers	70–130	Eastside Spectres	Albert Park Basketball Stadium	N/A	boxscore

=== Round 20 ===
Date	Home	Score	Away	Venue	Crowd	Box Score
4/09/1987	Canberra Cannons	118–114	North Melbourne Giants	AIS Arena	N/A	boxscore
4/09/1987	Hobart Tassie Devils	132–106	Sydney SuperSonics	Kingsborough Sports Centre	N/A	boxscore
5/09/1987	Illawarra Hawks	93–89	North Melbourne Giants	Beaton Park Stadium	N/A	boxscore
5/09/1987	West Sydney Westars	96–120	Adelaide 36ers	State Sports Centre	N/A	boxscore
5/09/1987	Westside Saints	109–122	Sydney SuperSonics	Keilor Stadium	N/A	boxscore
5/09/1987	Eastside Spectres	87–114	Perth Wildcats	Kilsyth Stadium	N/A	boxscore
6/09/1987	Brisbane Bullets	97–94	Adelaide 36ers	Brisbane Entertainment Centre	N/A	boxscore
6/09/1987	Melbourne Tigers	119–153	Perth Wildcats	Albert Park Basketball Stadium	N/A	boxscore

=== Round 21 ===
Date	Home	Score	Away	Venue	Crowd	Box Score
11/09/1987	Perth Wildcats	118–104	Sydney SuperSonics	Challenge Stadium	N/A	boxscore
11/09/1987	North Melbourne Giants	164–130	Newcastle Falcons	Melbourne Sports and Entertainment Centre	N/A	boxscore
11/09/1987	Hobart Tassie Devils	86–100	Illawarra Hawks	Kingsborough Sports Centre	N/A	boxscore
12/09/1987	Adelaide 36ers	144–99	Sydney SuperSonics	Apollo Entertainment Centre	N/A	boxscore
12/09/1987	Geelong Cats	126–123	Newcastle Falcons	Geelong Arena	N/A	boxscore
12/09/1987	Westside Saints	95–98	Illawarra Hawks	Keilor Stadium	N/A	boxscore
12/09/1987	Melbourne Tigers	114–136	Canberra Cannons	Albert Park Basketball Stadium	N/A	boxscore
13/09/1987	Eastside Spectres	122–105	Canberra Cannons	Melbourne Sports and Entertainment Centre	N/A	boxscore

=== Round 22 ===
Date	Home	Score	Away	Venue	Crowd	Box Score
18/09/1987	Adelaide 36ers	128–97	Geelong Cats	Apollo Entertainment Centre	N/A	boxscore
18/09/1987	Illawarra Hawks	124–109	Hobart Tassie Devils	Beaton Park Stadium	N/A	boxscore
18/09/1987	Sydney SuperSonics	118–98	Westside Saints	State Sports Centre	N/A	boxscore
19/09/1987	Perth Wildcats	119–105	Geelong Cats	Challenge Stadium	N/A	boxscore
19/09/1987	Canberra Cannons	124–95	Hobart Tassie Devils	AIS Arena	N/A	boxscore
19/09/1987	Brisbane Bullets	126–118	West Sydney Westars	Brisbane Entertainment Centre	N/A	boxscore
19/09/1987	Newcastle Falcons	151–126	Westside Saints	Newcastle Sports Entertainment Centre	N/A	boxscore
19/09/1987	Melbourne Tigers	114–112	North Melbourne Giants	Albert Park Basketball Stadium	N/A	boxscore
20/09/1987	Eastside Spectres	96–130	North Melbourne Giants	Melbourne Sports and Entertainment Centre	N/A	boxscore

== Ladder ==
Pos	1987 NBL season											
Pos	Team	Pld	W	L	PCT	Last 5	Streak	Home	Away	PF	PA	PP
1	Adelaide 36ers	26	21	5	80.77%	4–1	W2	11–2	10–3	3046	2677	113.78%
2	Brisbane Bullets^{1}	26	20	6	76.92%	5–0	W9	13–0	7–6	2711	2497	108.57%
3	Illawarra Hawks^{1}	26	20	6	76.92%	4–1	W4	13–0	7–6	2680	2528	106.01%
4	Perth Wildcats	26	19	7	73.08%	4–1	W4	11–2	8–5	3005	2756	109.03%
5	Canberra Cannons	26	17	9	65.38%	3–2	W1	10–3	7–6	2848	2770	102.82%
6	North Melbourne Giants	26	15	11	57.69%	2–3	W1	10–3	5–8	3060	2807	109.01%
7	Hobart Tassie Devils	26	14	12	53.85%	2–3	L3	8–5	6–7	2599	2568	101.21%
8	Eastside Spectres^{2}	26	13	13	50.00%	2–3	L1	6–7	7–6	2607	2596	100.42%
9	Geelong Cats^{2}	26	13	13	50.00%	3–2	L2	10–3	3–10	2644	2707	97.67%
10	Sydney Supersonics	26	9	17	34.62%	2–3	W1	5–8	4–9	2744	2861	95.91%
11	West Sydney Westars	26	8	18	30.77%	2–3	L2	4–9	4–9	2564	2695	95.14%
12	Newcastle Falcons	26	6	20	23.08%	3–2	W1	4–9	2–11	2948	3176	92.82%
13	Westside Saints	26	4	22	15.38%	0–5	L6	3–10	1–12	2673	2980	89.70%
14	Melbourne Tigers	26	3	23	11.54%	1–4	W1	3–10	0–13	2635	3146	83.76%

Updated to match(es) played on 20 September 1987. Source: NBL.com.au

The NBL tie-breaker system as outlined in the NBL Rules and Regulations states that in the case of an identical win–loss record, the results in games played between the teams will determine order of seeding.

^{1}Head-to-Head between Brisbane Bullets and Illawarra Hawks (1-1). Brisbane Bullets won For and Against (+11).

^{2}Head-to-Head between Eastside Spectres and Geelong Cats (1-1). Eastside Spectres won For and Against (+7).

== Finals ==
=== Playoff bracket ===
Elimination Finals
4	Perth Wildcats	101
5	Canberra Cannons	96
3	Illawarra Hawks	105
6	North Melbourne Giants	97

Semifinals
1	Adelaide 36ers	99	99	93
4	Perth Wildcats	98	101	103
2	Brisbane Bullets	109	77	100
3	Illawarra Hawks	87	78	82

Grand Final
2	Brisbane Bullets	80	106	X
4	Perth Wildcats	79	87	X

=== Elimination Finals ===
Date	Home	Score	Away	Venue	Crowd	Box Score
26/09/1987	Illawarra Hawks	105–97	North Melbourne Giants	Beaton Park Stadium	N/A	boxscore
27/09/1987	Perth Wildcats	101–96	Canberra Cannons	Challenge Stadium	N/A	boxscore

=== Semifinals ===
Date	Home	Score	Away	Venue	Crowd	Box Score
30/09/1987	Perth Wildcats	98–99	Adelaide 36ers	Challenge Stadium	N/A	boxscore
30/09/1987	Illawarra Hawks	87–109	Brisbane Bullets	Beaton Park Stadium	N/A	boxscore
2/10/1987	Adelaide 36ers	99–101	Perth Wildcats	Apollo Entertainment Centre	N/A	boxscore
2/10/1987	Brisbane Bullets	77–78	Illawarra Hawks	Brisbane Entertainment Centre	N/A	boxscore
4/10/1987	Adelaide 36ers	93–103	Perth Wildcats	Apollo Entertainment Centre	N/A	boxscore
4/10/1987	Brisbane Bullets	100–82	Illawarra Hawks	Brisbane Entertainment Centre	N/A	boxscore

=== Grand Final ===
Date	Home	Score	Away	Venue	Crowd	Box Score
10/10/1987	Perth Wildcats	79–80	Brisbane Bullets	Challenge Stadium	N/A	boxscore
16/10/1987	Brisbane Bullets	106–87	Perth Wildcats	Brisbane Entertainment Centre	N/A	boxscore

== 1987 NBL statistics leaders ==
Category	Player	Team	Stat
Points per game	Paul Stanley	Hobart Tassie Devils	920 pts
Rebounds per game	Mark Davis	Adelaide 36ers	17.1
Assists per game	Gordie McLeod	Illawarra Hawks	8.5
Steals per game	Steve Carfino	Hobart Tassie Devils	88 stls
Blocks per game	Willie Simmons	North Melbourne Giants	114 blks
Field goal percentage	James Crawford	Perth Wildcats	62.6%
Three-point percentage	Alan Black	Perth Wildcats	53.8%
Free throw percentage	Scott Fenton	Sydney Supersonics	92.5%

== NBL awards ==
- Most Valuable Player: Mark Davis, Adelaide 36ers & Leroy Loggins, Brisbane Bullets
- Most Valuable Player Grand Final: Leroy Loggins, Brisbane Bullets
- Rookie of the Year: Greg Hubbard, Illawarra Hawks
- Coach of the Year: David Lindstrom, Illawarra Hawks

== All NBL Team ==
#	Player	Team
PG	Steve Carfino	Hobart Tassie Devils
SG	Andrew Gaze	Melbourne Tigers
SF	Leroy Loggins	Brisbane Bullets
PF	Mark Davis	Adelaide 36ers
C	James Crawford	Perth Wildcats
