= Paul Stanley (basketball) =

American basketball player

Personal information
- Born: 1963 (age 62–63)
- Listed height: 6 ft 5 in (1.96 m)

Career information
- High school: Butler Area (Butler, Pennsylvania)
- College: Waynesburg (1981–1985)
- NBA draft: 1985: undrafted
- Playing career: 1986–1990
- Position: Forward

Career history
- 1986: Melbourne Tigers
- 1987: Hobart Devils
- 1988: Youngstown Pride
- 1989–1990: Hobart Devils

Career highlights
- All-NBL Second Team (1987); NBL scoring champion (1987)

Paul Stanley (born 1963) is an American former professional basketball player. He played college basketball for Waynesburg University and had a four-year career in the Australian National Basketball League (NBL), where he was the league's scoring champion in 1987.

== High school career ==
Stanley attended Butler Area Senior High School in Butler, Pennsylvania, where he was named an All District player. He was later named to the Butler County Sports Hall of Fame.

== College career ==
Between 1981 and 1985, Stanley played four seasons of college basketball for the Waynesburg University Yellow Jackets. He graduated as the school's all-time leader in totals points, finishing with 1,916 points in 111 career games. He led the team in scoring as a sophomore (16.4 ppg) and senior (21.7 ppg), and during his senior season, he had a 38-point effort against Westminster.

== Professional career ==
In 1986, Stanley made his debut in the Australian NBL with the Melbourne Tigers. He scored 40 points or more five times, including a 50-point game. In 25 games, he averaged 33.8 points, 5.8 rebounds, 2.8 assists and 1.3 steals per game. For the 1987 NBL season, Stanley joined the Hobart Devils. In May 1987, he became the fastest player in NBL history to reach 1,000 career points. He led the league in scoring in 1987, finishing with 920 points in 26 games. He averaged 35.4 points, 5.6 rebounds, 2.2 assists and 2.3 steals per game. His 35.4 points per game is the seventh-best mark in league history for a single year. He was subsequently named to the All-NBL Second Team.

In 1988, Stanley played for the Youngstown Pride in the World Basketball League.

In 1989, Stanley returned to Australia and re-joined the Hobart Devils for the back-end of the season, where in 11 games, he averaged 28.5 points, 6.4 rebounds, 2.5 assists and 1.0 steals per game. In August 1989, he became the fastest player in NBL history to reach 2,000 career points. He began the 1990 season with the Devils, but only played in the first seven games. In his final professional stint, he averaged 24.1 points, 5.7 rebounds and 3.1 assists per game.

Over 69 games in the NBL, Stanley averaged 32.6 points, which ranks first all time in league history for career points per game with a minimum of 60 games. He also shot 124-for-271 (45.76%) from 3-point range, which as of 2017 ranks second all time in league history for 3-point percentage with a minimum of 100 makes.
