= List of National Basketball League (Australia) annual scoring leaders =

In basketball, points are accumulated through free throws or field goals. The National Basketball League's (NBL) scoring title is awarded to the player with the highest points per game average in a given season. The scoring title was originally determined by total points scored through the 1996 season, after which points per game was used to determine the leader instead. Players who earned scoring titles before the 1984 season did not record any three-point field goals because the three-point line had just been implemented in the NBL at the start of that season.

Andrew Gaze has won the most scoring titles, with 14. He also holds the all-time records for total points scored (1,007; 1991) and points per game (44.1; 1987) in a season. Between 1986 and 2001, Gaze was the leader in either total points or points per game every season. While he led the NBL in points per game in 1987 (44.1) and 1990 (37.6), he was not the leader in total points scored. His 882 total points in 1987 were third best behind Paul Stanley (920) and James Crawford (903), while his 828 points in 1990 were also third best behind Derek Rucker (865) and Wayne McDaniel (848).

== Key ==
†		Denotes player who won the Most Valuable Player award that year			
Player (X)		Denotes the number of times the player had been the scoring leader up to and including that season			
G	Guard	F	Forward	C	Center

== Scoring leaders ==
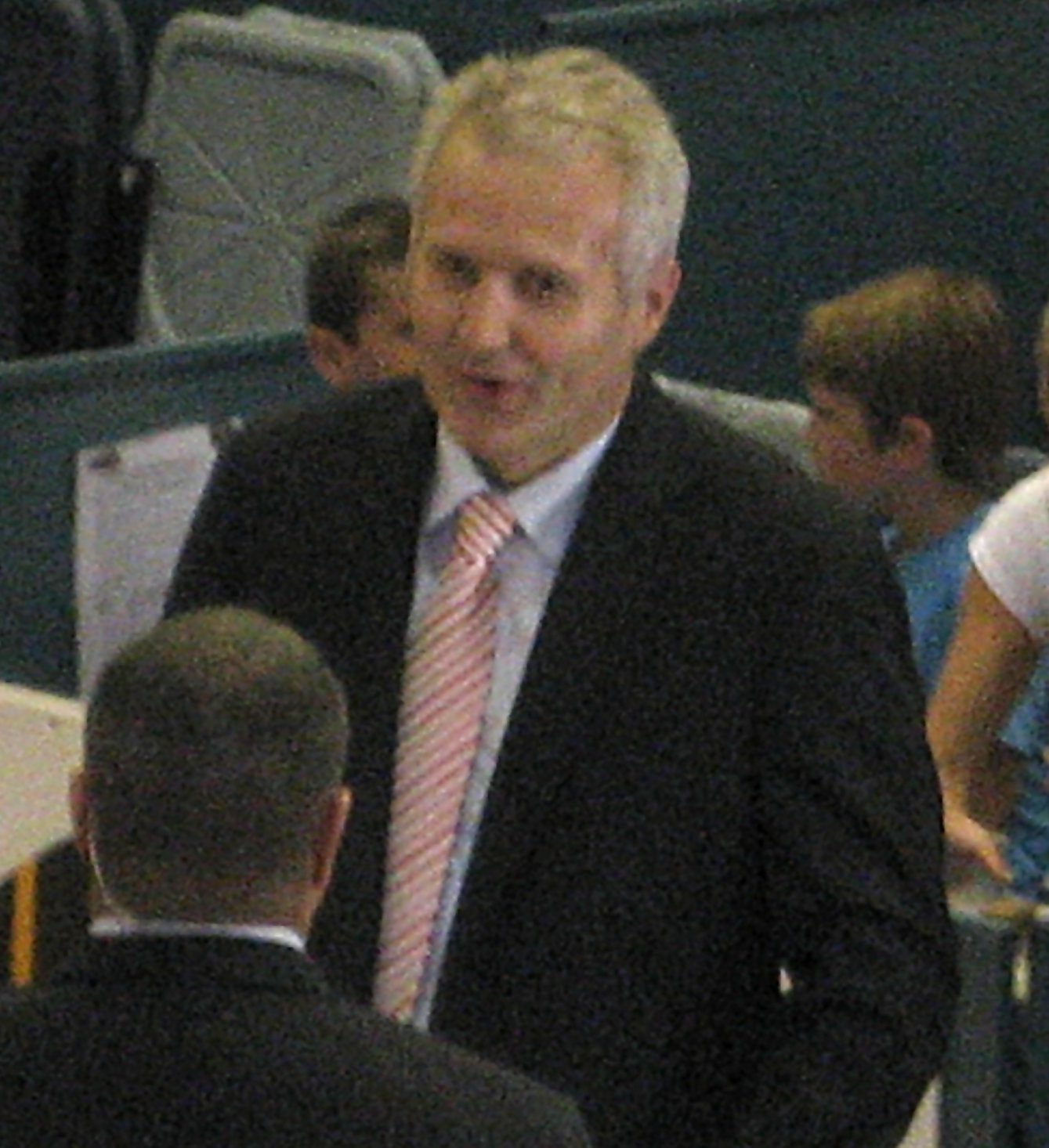
Andrew Gaze recorded 14 scoring titles in his career, the most in NBL history

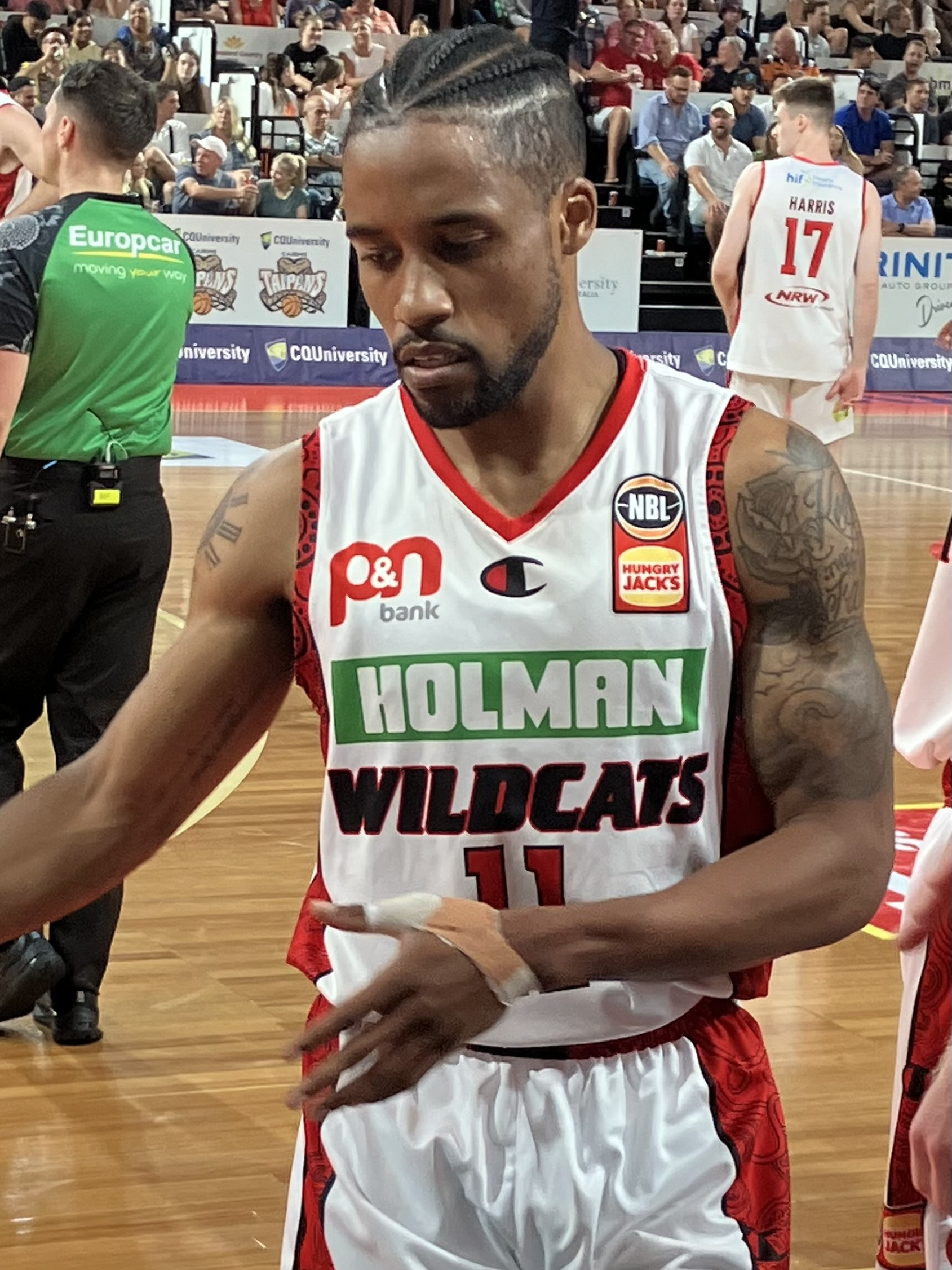
Bryce Cotton is an eight-time scoring champion

Season	Player	Pos	Nationality	Team	Games played	Total points	Ref
1979	Cal Bruton	G	United States	Brisbane Bullets	18	597	
1980 †	Rocky Smith	G	United States	St. Kilda Saints	22	737	
1981 †	Mike Jones	F/C	United States	Illawarra Hawks	22	671	
1982	Reg Biddings	F	United States	Adelaide City Eagles	26	782	
1983	Mike Jones (2)	F/C	United States	Illawarra Hawks	22	719	
1984	Al Green	G	United States	West Adelaide Bearcats	21	829	
1985	Kendal Pinder	F/C	Bahamas	Sydney Supersonics	26	871	
1986	Andrew Gaze	G	Australia	Melbourne Tigers	25	922	
1987	Paul Stanley (Note: In the 1987 season, Andrew Gaze had the highest scoring average (44.1) but was third in total points (882).)	F	United States	Hobart Devils	26	920	
1988	Andrew Gaze (2)	G	Australia	Melbourne Tigers	24	886	
1989	Andrew Gaze (3)	G	Australia	Melbourne Tigers	24	831	
1990 †	Derek Rucker (Note: In the 1990 season, Andrew Gaze had the highest scoring average (37.6) but was third in total points (828).)	G	United States	Brisbane Bullets	25	865	
1991 †	Andrew Gaze (4)	G	Australia	Melbourne Tigers	26	1,007	
1992 †	Andrew Gaze (5)	G	Australia	Melbourne Tigers	23	811	
1993	Andrew Gaze (6)	G	Australia	Melbourne Tigers	26	858	
1994 †	Andrew Gaze (7)	G	Australia	Melbourne Tigers	26	890	
1995 †	Andrew Gaze (8)	G	Australia	Melbourne Tigers	26	900	
1996 †	Andrew Gaze (9)	G	Australia	Melbourne Tigers	26	843	

Season	Player	Pos	Nationality	Team	Games played	Points per game	Ref
1997 †	Andrew Gaze (10)	G	Australia	Melbourne Tigers	30	31.5	
1998 †	Andrew Gaze (11)	G	Australia	Melbourne Tigers	30	31.8	
1998–99	Andrew Gaze (12)	G	Australia	Melbourne Tigers	17	33.5	
1999–00	Andrew Gaze (13)	G	Australia	Melbourne Tigers	28	28.9	
2000–01	Andrew Gaze (14)	G	Australia	Melbourne Tigers	27	29.1	
2001–02	Randy Rutherford	G	United States	Brisbane Bullets	30	25.0	
2002–03	John Rillie	G	Australia	West Sydney Razorbacks	16	23.6	
2003–04 †	Matthew Nielsen	F	Australia	Sydney Kings	33	23.5	
2004–05 †	Brian Wethers	G/F	United States	Hunter Pirates	32	24.3	
2005–06	Cortez Groves	G	United States	Wollongong Hawks	32	24.1	
2006–07	Carlos Powell	F	United States	New Zealand Breakers	33	28.2	
2007–08	Ebi Ere	G/F	Nigeria	Brisbane Bullets	29	27.1	
2008–09 †	Kirk Penney	G/F	New Zealand	New Zealand Breakers	28	24.2	
2009–10	Kirk Penney (2)	G/F	New Zealand	New Zealand Breakers	19	23.2	
2010–11	Kirk Penney (3) (Note: In the 2010–11 season, both Kirk Penney and Gary Ervin averaged 20.1 points per game during the regular season when rounded to one decimal place. When rounded to two decimal places, Penney averaged 20.13 ppg (463 points / 23 games) while Ervin averaged 20.07 ppg (542 points / 27 games).)	G/F	New Zealand	New Zealand Breakers	23	20.1	
2011–12 †	Kevin Lisch	G	United States	Perth Wildcats	28	17.6	
2012–13	Ben Madgen	G/F	Australia	Sydney Kings	28	17.9	
2013–14	Chris Goulding	G	Australia	Melbourne Tigers	27	23.0	
2014–15	Josh Childress	F	United States	Sydney Kings	18	21.1	
2015–16	Jerome Randle	G	United States	Adelaide 36ers	23	23.0	
2016–17	Bryce Cotton (Note: In the 2016–17 season, both Bryce Cotton and Casper Ware averaged 22.1 points per game during the regular season when rounded to one decimal place. When rounded to three decimal places, Cotton averaged 22.090 ppg while Ware averaged 22.055.)	G	United States	Perth Wildcats	11	22.1	
2017–18	Jerome Randle (2) (Note: In the 2017–18 season, Bryce Cotton had the highest point total (544) but was third in scoring average (19.4).)	G	United States	Sydney Kings	19	19.8	
2018–19	Bryce Cotton (2) (Note: In the 2018–19 season, both Bryce Cotton and Melo Trimble averaged 22.5 points per game during the regular season when rounded to one decimal place. When rounded to two decimal places, Cotton averaged 22.52 ppg (563 points / 25 games) while Trimble averaged 22.50 ppg (630 points / 28 games).)	G	United States	Perth Wildcats	25	22.5	
2019–20 †	Bryce Cotton (3)	G	United States	Perth Wildcats	27	22.6	
2020–21 †	Bryce Cotton (4) (Note: In the 2020–21 season, Nathan Sobey had the highest point total (758) but was second in scoring average (21.1).)	G	United States	Perth Wildcats	32	23.5	
2021–22	Bryce Cotton (5)	G	United States	Perth Wildcats	28	22.7	
2022–23	Bryce Cotton (6)	G	United States	Perth Wildcats	28	23.5	
2023–24 †	Bryce Cotton (7)	G	United States	Perth Wildcats	27	23.1	
2024–25 †	Bryce Cotton (8)	G	United States	Perth Wildcats	24	28.6	
2025–26 †	Bryce Cotton (9)	G	Australia (Note: Cotton became an Australian citizen prior to the 2025–26 season.)	Adelaide 36ers	32	25.7	

=== Multiple-time leaders ===
Ranking	Player	Team	Times leader	Years
1	Andrew Gaze	Melbourne Tigers	14	1986, 1988, 1989, 1991, 1992, 1993, 1994, 1995, 1996, 1997, 1998, 1999, 2000, 2001
2	Bryce Cotton	Perth Wildcats (8) / Adelaide 36ers (1)	9	2017, 2019, 2020, 2021, 2022, 2023, 2024, 2025, 2026
3	Kirk Penney	New Zealand Breakers	3	2009, 2010, 2011
4	Mike Jones	Illawarra Hawks	2	1981, 1983
4	Jerome Randle	Adelaide 36ers (1) / Sydney Kings (1)	2	2016, 2018
