= Phil Smyth =

Australian basketball player (born 1958)

Personal information
- Born: 11 May 1958 (age 68) Adelaide, South Australia, Australia
- Listed height: 183 cm (6 ft 0 in)
- Listed weight: 76 kg (168 lb)

Career information
- High school: Marion (Adelaide, South Australia)
- Playing career: 1978–1995
- Position: Point guard

Career history

Playing
- 1978–1982: Sturt Sabres
- 1982: St. Kilda Saints
- 1983–1992: Canberra Cannons
- 1993–1994: Adelaide 36ers
- 1995: Sydney Kings

Coaching
- 1998–2008: Adelaide 36ers

Career highlights
- As a player: 3× NBL champion (1983, 1984, 1988); 2× NBL Grand Final MVP (1983, 1988); 6× All-NBL First Team (1982–1985, 1988, 1989); 4× NBL Defensive Player of the Year (1982, 1983, 1988, 1989); Gaze Medal winner (1988); NBL's 20th Anniversary Team; NBL's 25th Anniversary Team; As a coach: 3× NBL champion (1998, 1999, 2002)

Philip John Smyth AM (born 11 May 1958) is an Australian former professional basketball player and coach. He won three National Basketball League (NBL) championships with the Canberra Cannons before going on to be a three-time championship-winning head coach of the NBL's Adelaide 36ers. Smyth was a four-time Olympian with the Australian national basketball team.

== Early life ==
Smyth started playing basketball when he was aged six with his local church team in Adelaide. He played football until he was a teenager and played for the South Australian state team at the under-14 level. Smyth decided to give up football when his club was taken over by a coach who he described as a "ranter and yeller" and he subsequently focused on basketball. Smyth attended Marion High School.

== Professional career ==
Smyth was already seen as one of Australia's best point guards when the National Basketball League first started in 1979, yet it took him until 1982 to actually play in the league, despite having represented Australia at the 1978 FIBA World Championship in the Philippines and at the 1980 Summer Olympics in Moscow. Smyth played for the Sturt Sabres in the SA State League from 1978 to 1982.

For personal reasons, Smyth chose not to play in the NBL until 1982 and even then, while still living in Adelaide, he signed to play with the St Kilda Saints, commuting between his home in Adelaide and Melbourne where the Saints were based. He only played for St Kilda for the 1982 NBL season, winning the NBL's Defensive Player of the Year award and selection in the All-NBL First Team in the process before signing with the Canberra Cannons from 1983. At this time he also moved from Adelaide to Canberra for what would prove to be 10 seasons in Australia's capital city. During that time he enhanced his reputation as one of the best ever Australian basketball players and helped transform the Cannons into a championship winning team.

Canberra won their first NBL Championship in 1983, Smyth's first season with the club. The Cannons defeated the defending champion West Adelaide Bearcats 75–73 in the grand final. They would go on to win the championship again in 1984, this time defeating the emerging Brisbane Bullets 84–82 in another closely fought grand final win. Smyth's play during this time was a major contributor to Canberra's success. He won his second consecutive Defensive Player of the Year award in 1983 and was also a member of the ALL-NBL First Team in 1983, 1984, 1985, 1988 and 1989.

Smyth would win his 3rd NBL Championship when the Cannons defeated the North Melbourne Giants in the 1988 grand final series two games to one. He would also be named as the Grand Final MVP in 1988. He narrowly missed out on a fourth NBL crown in 1989 when the Giants reversed the 1988 result by defeating Canberra two games to one.

He would play on with the Cannons until the end of the 1992 NBL season when he was lured back home to Adelaide to play for the Adelaide 36ers. Despite being in the twilight of his playing career, Smyth would again be a major contributor helping the generally under-performing 36ers get back into the playoffs. Smyth played two seasons for the 36ers and would lose his second and last NBL grand final series in 1994, again to the North Melbourne Giants who defeated Adelaide 2–0 in the championship series.

After two season back home in Adelaide, Smyth had a falling out with 36ers coach Mike Dunlap who had a reputation for favouring the younger players. During 1994 Dunlap had even begun to start 3rd year player Brett Maher as the 36ers point guard and playing Smyth from the bench despite Smyth still being the starting point guard for the Australian Boomers (when Smyth questioned Dunlap on why he was benched, Dunlap told him that it was simply because he was old). This saw Smyth sign for the NBL's highest profile club, the Sydney Kings for the 1995 season where he linked with his former Canberra championship winning coach Bob Turner. In an injury interrupted season, Smyth played just 16 games for the Kings, who didn't make the playoffs. He retired from playing professional basketball after his season with the Kings.

Phil Smyth played 356 games in his NBL career, 25 with St Kilda, 282 with Canberra, 33 for Adelaide and 16 for Sydney. He averaged 13.6 points per game at 44.8%, 4.2 rebounds, 4.8 assists and 2.3 steals.

== National team career ==
Smyth represented Australia at four Summer Olympic Games (1980, 1984, 1988 and 1992), achieving a best result of 4th at the 1988 Games in Seoul where he was the team captain. He was also a member of the Boomers at the FIBA World Championships in 1978, 1982, 1986, 1990 and 1994 with a best result of 5th place in both 1982 and 1994. At the 1984 Los Angeles Olympic Games, Smyth and his wife, Jenny Cheesman, would become the first husband and wife to captain Australian teams at the same Olympics.

== Coaching career ==
After Adelaide 36ers coach Dave Claxton failed to take the team to the playoffs in 1997, the club hired the recently retired Smyth as head coach of the team from the 1998 NBL season, the club banking on his years of experience as a player despite his only previous coaching experience being as a specialist coach at the Australian Institute of Sport (AIS) during his playing days with Canberra as well as coaching South Adelaide women's teams in the early 1980s.

Smyth's impact on the club was immediate, with the 36ers winning both the 1998 and 1998–99 NBL Championships in his first two seasons coaching in the league (according to Smyth, the 36ers coaching job in 1998 came down to himself and former North Melbourne and Brisbane coach Bruce Palmer, but the 36ers ultimately wanted someone local). The team was beaten semi finalists for the next two seasons before winning their 4th championship, and 3rd under Smyth, in 2001–02. Under his coaching the team would reach the elimination finals in 2002–03 and 2003–04 and improve to the quarters in 2004–05 and 2005–06 before failing to reach the playoffs twice which resulted in Smyth being replaced as head coach by former player and assistant Scott Ninnis.

In all, Phil Smyth coached the 36ers in the NBL for 365 games over 11 seasons, winning 205 games and losing 160.

Following his stellar international career as a player and his championship success coaching the 36ers, Smyth was appointed head coach of the Boomers in January 2001. Unfortunately his international coaching career only lasted eight months. After losing the 2001 FIBA Oceania Championship to the New Zealand Tall Blacks 1-2 the team failed to qualify for the 2002 FIBA World Championship in Indianapolis as a result. It was the first time Australia had missed out on the FIBA World Championship since making their championship debut in 1970. Smyth resigned from the job on 27 September 2001 and was ultimately replaced by the man who he defeated to win both the 1998 and 1998–99 NBL Championships, Brian Goorjian.

In 2019 Smyth was appointed to the position of Coaching Mentor & Leadership Consultant at the Brisbane Lions in the AFL.

I’m 2026 Smyth was also a member of the selection panel for the new Senior Coach at the Brisbane Lions in the AFL.

== Media work ==
In March 2009 Smyth joined radio presenter and former cricketer K. G. Cunningham to host an internet sports show KG and the General, streaming live from 3-6pm weekdays and podcast.

== Honours ==
Smyth was made a Member of the Order of Australia in 1988, inducted into the Sport Australia Hall of Fame in 1997, and received an Australian Sports Medal in 2000.

== Honour roll ==
NBL career:	1982–1995
Games:	356 (StK 25, Can 282, Adl 33, Syd 16)
All-NBL First Team:	6 (1982, 1983, 1984, 1985, 1988, 1989)
NBL best Defensive Player:	4 (1982, 1983, 1988, 1989)
NBL Grand Final appearances (player):	5 (1983, 1984, 1988, 1989, 1994)
NBL Championships (player):	3 (1983, 1984, 1988)
NBL Grand Final MVP:	1988
NBL Grand Final appearances (coach):	3 (1998, 1998/99, 2001/02)
NBL Championships (coach):	3 (1998, 1998/99, 2001/02)
NBL 20th Anniversary Team:	1998
NBL 25th Anniversary Team:	2003

== NBL career stats ==
Legend
GP	Games played	GS	Games started	MPG	Minutes per game
FG%	Field goal percentage	3P%	3-point field goal percentage	FT%	Free throw percentage
RPG	Rebounds per game	APG	Assists per game	SPG	Steals per game
BPG	Blocks per game	PPG	Points per game	**Bold**	Career high

†	Denotes season(s) in which Smyth won an NBL championship

Year	Team	GP	GS	MPG	FG%	3P%	FT%	RPG	APG	SPG	BPG	PPG
1982	St. Kilda Saints	25	25	NA	.491	NA	.846	5.2	2.7	NA	NA	18.6
1983†	Canberra Cannons	27	27	NA	.498	NA	.875	3.1	5.1	2.6	0.4	14.6
1984†	Canberra Cannons	22	22	NA	.450	.461	.873	3.8	6.1	2.0	0.2	14.4
1985	Canberra Cannons	28	28	NA	.457	.372	.767	**5.6**	5.3	**3.4**	0.2	13.3
1986	Canberra Cannons	25	25	NA	.407	.341	**.888**	5.3	5.0	3.0	0.4	12.2
1987	Canberra Cannons	22	22	42.8	.452	.472	.847	5.3	5.5	**3.4**	**0.5**	18.4
1988†	Canberra Cannons	30	**30**	42.3	.476	.456	.813	5.3	5.5	2.8	0.2	**22.3**
1989	Canberra Cannons	28	28	**44.3**	.420	.408	.855	**5.6**	4.9	3.3	0.1	17.4
1990	Canberra Cannons	22	22	36.7	.372	.367	.861	3.7	4.4	2.4	0.1	9.7
1991	Canberra Cannons	24	24	40.9	.390	.373	.852	3.6	4.7	2.1	0.2	15.4
1992	Canberra Cannons	26	26	40.0	**.536**	**.534**	.822	1.1	**7.0**	2.5	0.2	12.9
1993	Adelaide 36ers	28	28	37.7	.412	.398	.786	2.6	4.8	1.6	0.3	11.6
1994	Adelaide 36ers	**33**	1	21.8	.442	.431	.818	1.9	2.8	1.2	0.1	6.6
1995	Sydney Kings	16	16	36.9	.365	.296	.852	3.3	3.4	1.4	0.3	6.8
**Career**		356	324	NA	.448	.416	.839	4.2	4.8	2.3	0.2	13.9

== Coaching record ==
=== NBL ===
Legend
Regular season	G	Games coached	W	Games won	L	Games lost	W–L %	Win–loss %
Playoffs	PG	Playoff games	PW	Playoff wins	PL	Playoff losses	PW–L %	Playoff win–loss %

Team	Year	G	W	L	W–L%	Finish	PG	PW	PL	PW–L%	Result
Adelaide 36ers	1998	30	19	11	.633	2nd	4	4	0	1.000	Champions
Adelaide 36ers	1998–99	26	18	8	.692	1st	7	6	1	.857	Champions
Adelaide 36ers	1999–00	28	22	6	.786	1st	3	1	2	.333	Semi-finalists
Adelaide 36ers	2000–01	28	16	12	.571	6th	6	3	3	.500	Semi-finalists
Adelaide 36ers	2001–02	30	17	13	.567	3rd	8	6	2	.750	Champions
Adelaide 36ers	2002–03	30	16	14	.533	5th	3	1	2	.333	Elimination-Finalists
Adelaide 36ers	2003–04	33	14	19	.424	8th	1	0	1	.000	Elimination-Finalists
Adelaide 36ers	2004–05	32	19	13	.594	5th	1	0	1	.000	Quarter-finalists
Adelaide 36ers	2005–06	31	18	13	.594	4th	1	0	1	.000	Quarter-finalists
Adelaide 36ers	2006–07	33	11	22	.333	11th	—	—	—	—	Missed playoffs
Adelaide 36ers	2007–08	30	14	16	.533	9th	—	—	—	—	Missed playoffs
Career		331	184	147	.556		34	21	13	.618	
