= 1989 NBL season =

- League: National Basketball League
- Sport: Basketball
- Duration: 20 April – 24 September 1989; 29 September – 8 October 1989 (Semi-finals); 14 – 20 October 1989 (Grand Finals)
- Teams: 13
- TV partner: Seven Network

Regular season
- Season champions: Canberra Cannons
- Season MVP: Scott Fisher (North Melbourne)
- Top scorer: Andrew Gaze (Melbourne)

Finals
- Champions: North Melbourne Giants (1st title)
- Runners-up: Canberra Cannons
- Finals MVP: Scott Fisher (North Melbourne)

NBL seasons
- ← 1988 1990 →

The 1989 NBL season was the 11th season of competition since its establishment in 1979. A total of 13 teams contest the league.

== Clubs ==
Club	Location	Home Venue	Capacity	Founded	Head coach
Adelaide 36ers	Adelaide, South Australia	Apollo Stadium	3,000	1982	(United States) Gary Fox
Brisbane Bullets	Brisbane, Queensland	Brisbane Entertainment Centre	13,500	1979	(Australia) Brian Kerle
Canberra Cannons	Canberra, Australian Capital Territory	AIS Arena	5,200	1979	(Australia) Steve Breheny*
Eastside Spectres	(Victoria (state)) Melbourne, Victoria	Burwood Stadium	2,000	1979	(United States) Brian Goorjian
Geelong Supercats	(Victoria (state)) Geelong, Victoria	Geelong Arena	2,000	1982	(Australia) Barry Barnes
Hobart Tassie Devils	Hobart, Tasmania	Derwent Entertainment Centre	5,400	1983	(Australia) Tom Maher
Illawarra Hawks	Wollongong, New South Wales	Illawarra Basketball Stadium	2,000	1979	(Australia) Dave Lindstrom
Melbourne Tigers	(Victoria (state)) Melbourne, Victoria	The Glass House	7,200	1931	(Australia) Lindsay Gaze
Newcastle Falcons	Newcastle, New South Wales	Broadmeadow Basketball Stadium	2,200	1979	(Australia) Ken Cole
North Melbourne Giants	(Victoria (state)) Melbourne, Victoria	The Glass House	7,200	1980	(United States) Bruce Palmer
Perth Wildcats	Perth, Western Australia	Perth Superdome	4,500	1982	(Australia) Alan Black
Sydney Kings	Sydney, New South Wales	State Sports Centre	5,006	1988	(United States) Bob Turner
Westside Saints	(Victoria (state)) Melbourne, Victoria	Keilor Stadium	2,000	1979	(Australia) Colin Cadee

=== NOTES ===
- Steve Breheny was suspended by the league following the semi-finals series between Canberra and Sydney for allegedly headbutting Kings player Damian Keogh. Assistant Coach Andy Campbell was in charge of the team for the Grand Final Series.

== Regular season ==
The 1989 regular season took place over 22 rounds between 20 April 1989 and 16 September 1989.

=== Round 1 ===
Date	Home	Score	Away	Venue	Crowd	Box Score
20/04/1989	Westside Saints	102–112	Canberra Cannons	Melbourne Sports and Entertainment Centre	N/A	boxscore
21/04/1989	Illawarra Hawks	99–106	Geelong Supercats	Beaton Park Stadium	N/A	boxscore
21/04/1989	Newcastle Falcons	93–109	Brisbane Bullets	Newcastle Sports Entertainment Centre	N/A	boxscore
21/04/1989	Hobart Tassie Devils	98–115	Melbourne Tigers	Derwent Entertainment Centre	N/A	boxscore
21/04/1989	North Melbourne Giants	131–118	Westside Saints	Melbourne Sports and Entertainment Centre	N/A	boxscore
22/04/1989	Adelaide 36ers	132–93	Perth Wildcats	Apollo Entertainment Centre	N/A	boxscore
22/04/1989	Canberra Cannons	114–105	Geelong Supercats	AIS Arena	N/A	boxscore
22/04/1989	Sydney Kings	82–79	Brisbane Bullets	State Sports Centre	N/A	boxscore
22/04/1989	Eastside Spectres	109–111	Melbourne Tigers	Melbourne Sports and Entertainment Centre	N/A	boxscore

=== Round 2 ===
Date	Home	Score	Away	Venue	Crowd	Box Score
28/04/1989	Perth Wildcats	117–97	Sydney Kings	Challenge Stadium	N/A	boxscore
28/04/1989	Canberra Cannons	105–96	Brisbane Bullets	AIS Arena	N/A	boxscore
28/04/1989	Geelong Supercats	125–121	Newcastle Falcons	Geelong Arena	N/A	boxscore
28/04/1989	Westside Saints	111–105	Eastside Spectres	Melbourne Sports and Entertainment Centre	N/A	boxscore
29/04/1989	Adelaide 36ers	104–113	Sydney Kings	Apollo Entertainment Centre	N/A	boxscore
29/04/1989	Illawarra Hawks	102–109	Brisbane Bullets	Beaton Park Stadium	N/A	boxscore
29/04/1989	Melbourne Tigers	122–116	Newcastle Falcons	Melbourne Sports and Entertainment Centre	N/A	boxscore
29/04/1989	Hobart Tassie Devils	97–131	North Melbourne Giants	Derwent Entertainment Centre	N/A	boxscore

=== Round 3 ===
Date	Home	Score	Away	Venue	Crowd	Box Score
5/05/1989	Perth Wildcats	100–97	Geelong Supercats	Challenge Stadium	N/A	boxscore
5/05/1989	Sydney Kings	67–92	Eastside Spectres	State Sports Centre	N/A	boxscore
5/05/1989	Illawarra Hawks	129–132	Melbourne Tigers	Beaton Park Stadium	N/A	boxscore
6/05/1989	Adelaide 36ers	125–116	Geelong Supercats	Apollo Entertainment Centre	N/A	boxscore
6/05/1989	Canberra Cannons	104–101	Westside Saints	AIS Arena	N/A	boxscore
6/05/1989	Newcastle Falcons	76–81	Eastside Spectres	Newcastle Sports Entertainment Centre	N/A	boxscore
6/05/1989	Hobart Tassie Devils	82–112	Brisbane Bullets	Derwent Entertainment Centre	N/A	boxscore

=== Round 4 ===
Date	Home	Score	Away	Venue	Crowd	Box Score
11/05/1989	Westside Saints	102–124	Adelaide 36ers	Melbourne Sports and Entertainment Centre	N/A	boxscore
12/05/1989	North Melbourne Giants	136–124	Adelaide 36ers	Melbourne Sports and Entertainment Centre	N/A	boxscore
12/05/1989	Hobart Tassie Devils	91–96	Canberra Cannons	Derwent Entertainment Centre	N/A	boxscore
13/05/1989	Eastside Spectres	112–97	Canberra Cannons	Melbourne Sports and Entertainment Centre	N/A	boxscore
13/05/1989	Geelong Supercats	95–107	Perth Wildcats	Geelong Arena	N/A	boxscore
13/05/1989	Sydney Kings	115–112	Newcastle Falcons	State Sports Centre	N/A	boxscore
13/05/1989	Brisbane Bullets	170–127	Illawarra Hawks	Brisbane Entertainment Centre	N/A	boxscore
14/05/1989	Melbourne Tigers	118–138	Perth Wildcats	Melbourne Sports and Entertainment Centre	N/A	boxscore

=== Round 5 ===
Date	Home	Score	Away	Venue	Crowd	Box Score
19/05/1989	Perth Wildcats	113–100	Eastside Spectres	Challenge Stadium	N/A	boxscore
19/05/1989	Sydney Kings	82–77	Hobart Tassie Devils	State Sports Centre	N/A	boxscore
19/05/1989	North Melbourne Giants	135–119	Melbourne Tigers	Melbourne Sports and Entertainment Centre	N/A	boxscore
20/05/1989	Adelaide 36ers	100–99	Eastside Spectres	Apollo Entertainment Centre	N/A	boxscore
20/05/1989	Canberra Cannons	125–110	Illawarra Hawks	AIS Arena	N/A	boxscore
20/05/1989	Newcastle Falcons	128–111	Hobart Tassie Devils	Newcastle Sports Entertainment Centre	N/A	boxscore
20/05/1989	Brisbane Bullets	115–116	Geelong Supercats	Brisbane Entertainment Centre	N/A	boxscore

=== Round 6 ===
Date	Home	Score	Away	Venue	Crowd	Box Score
26/05/1989	Perth Wildcats	134–129	Newcastle Falcons	Challenge Stadium	N/A	boxscore
26/05/1989	Illawarra Hawks	124–123	North Melbourne Giants	Beaton Park Stadium	N/A	boxscore
26/05/1989	Melbourne Tigers	125–128	Sydney Kings	Melbourne Sports and Entertainment Centre	N/A	boxscore
27/05/1989	Adelaide 36ers	148–123	Newcastle Falcons	Apollo Entertainment Centre	N/A	boxscore
27/05/1989	Canberra Cannons	109–108	North Melbourne Giants	AIS Arena	N/A	boxscore
27/05/1989	Geelong Supercats	90–95	Sydney Kings	Geelong Arena	N/A	boxscore
27/05/1989	Eastside Spectres	100–99	Hobart Tassie Devils	Melbourne Sports and Entertainment Centre	N/A	boxscore

=== Round 7 ===
Date	Home	Score	Away	Venue	Crowd	Box Score
2/06/1989	Canberra Cannons	128–113	Adelaide 36ers	AIS Arena	N/A	boxscore
2/06/1989	Hobart Tassie Devils	95–108	Westside Saints	Derwent Entertainment Centre	N/A	boxscore
2/06/1989	Newcastle Falcons	125–120	North Melbourne Giants	Newcastle Sports Entertainment Centre	N/A	boxscore
3/06/1989	Sydney Kings	110–107	North Melbourne Giants	State Sports Centre	N/A	boxscore
3/06/1989	Eastside Spectres	112–89	Westside Saints	Melbourne Sports and Entertainment Centre	N/A	boxscore
3/06/1989	Geelong Supercats	86–106	Melbourne Tigers	Geelong Arena	N/A	boxscore
3/06/1989	Brisbane Bullets	110–103	Perth Wildcats	Brisbane Entertainment Centre	N/A	boxscore
3/06/1989	Illawarra Hawks	104–117	Adelaide 36ers	Beaton Park Stadium	N/A	boxscore

=== Round 8 ===
Date	Home	Score	Away	Venue	Crowd	Box Score
8/06/1989	Westside Saints	102–103	Sydney Kings	Melbourne Sports and Entertainment Centre	N/A	boxscore
9/06/1989	North Melbourne Giants	130–109	Geelong Supercats	Melbourne Sports and Entertainment Centre	N/A	boxscore
9/06/1989	Hobart Tassie Devils	123–120	Illawarra Hawks	Derwent Entertainment Centre	N/A	boxscore
10/06/1989	Brisbane Bullets	108–137	Melbourne Tigers	Brisbane Entertainment Centre	N/A	boxscore
10/06/1989	Eastside Spectres	116–113	Illawarra Hawks	Melbourne Sports and Entertainment Centre	N/A	boxscore
10/06/1989	Adelaide 36ers	126–124	Canberra Cannons	Apollo Entertainment Centre	N/A	boxscore

=== Round 9 ===
Date	Home	Score	Away	Venue	Crowd	Box Score
15/06/1989	Westside Saints	110–114	Melbourne Tigers	Melbourne Sports and Entertainment Centre	N/A	boxscore
16/06/1989	Newcastle Falcons	105–114	Canberra Cannons	Newcastle Sports Entertainment Centre	N/A	boxscore
16/06/1989	Adelaide 36ers	121–102	Brisbane Bullets	Apollo Entertainment Centre	N/A	boxscore
16/06/1989	North Melbourne Giants	142–112	Eastside Spectres	Melbourne Sports and Entertainment Centre	N/A	boxscore
17/06/1989	Perth Wildcats	105–104	Brisbane Bullets	Challenge Stadium	N/A	boxscore
17/06/1989	Illawarra Hawks	141–125	Westside Saints	Beaton Park Stadium	N/A	boxscore
17/06/1989	Sydney Kings	119–108	Canberra Cannons	State Sports Centre	N/A	boxscore
17/06/1989	Geelong Supercats	112–121	Hobart Tassie Devils	Geelong Arena	N/A	boxscore
17/06/1989	Melbourne Tigers	115–105	Hobart Tassie Devils	Melbourne Sports and Entertainment Centre	N/A	boxscore

=== Round 10 ===
Date	Home	Score	Away	Venue	Crowd	Box Score
22/06/1989	Westside Saints	98–93	Perth Wildcats	Melbourne Sports and Entertainment Centre	N/A	boxscore
23/06/1989	Brisbane Bullets	92–79	Eastside Spectres	Brisbane Entertainment Centre	N/A	boxscore
23/06/1989	North Melbourne Giants	104–116	Perth Wildcats	Melbourne Sports and Entertainment Centre	N/A	boxscore
24/06/1989	Sydney Kings	110–106	Illawarra Hawks	State Sports Centre	N/A	boxscore
24/06/1989	Canberra Cannons	91–94	Eastside Spectres	AIS Arena	N/A	boxscore
24/06/1989	Hobart Tassie Devils	113–105	Newcastle Falcons	Derwent Entertainment Centre	N/A	boxscore
24/06/1989	Geelong Supercats	91–114	Adelaide 36ers	Geelong Arena	N/A	boxscore
25/06/1989	Melbourne Tigers	113–112	Adelaide 36ers	Melbourne Sports and Entertainment Centre	N/A	boxscore

=== Round 11 ===
Date	Home	Score	Away	Venue	Crowd	Box Score
29/06/1989	Westside Saints	93–118	North Melbourne Giants	Melbourne Sports and Entertainment Centre	N/A	boxscore
30/06/1989	North Melbourne Giants	128–113	Sydney Kings	Melbourne Sports and Entertainment Centre	N/A	boxscore
1/07/1989	Brisbane Bullets	77–78	Westside Saints	Brisbane Entertainment Centre	N/A	boxscore
1/07/1989	Perth Wildcats	116–106	Adelaide 36ers	Challenge Stadium	N/A	boxscore
1/07/1989	Hobart Tassie Devils	95–98	Sydney Kings	Derwent Entertainment Centre	N/A	boxscore
1/07/1989	Newcastle Falcons	132–141	Illawarra Hawks	Newcastle Sports Entertainment Centre	N/A	boxscore
1/07/1989	Geelong Supercats	112–131	Canberra Cannons	Geelong Arena	N/A	boxscore
2/07/1989	Melbourne Tigers	105–114	Canberra Cannons	Melbourne Sports and Entertainment Centre	N/A	boxscore

=== Round 13 ===
Date	Home	Score	Away	Venue	Crowd	Box Score
14/07/1989	Illawarra Hawks	130–115	Perth Wildcats	Beaton Park Stadium	N/A	boxscore
14/07/1989	Sydney Kings	112–115	Melbourne Tigers	State Sports Centre	N/A	boxscore
14/07/1989	North Melbourne Giants	139–117	Hobart Tassie Devils	Melbourne Sports and Entertainment Centre	N/A	boxscore
15/07/1989	Canberra Cannons	123–125	Perth Wildcats	AIS Arena	N/A	boxscore
15/07/1989	Newcastle Falcons	109–135	Melbourne Tigers	Newcastle Sports Entertainment Centre	N/A	boxscore
15/07/1989	Eastside Spectres	104–124	Adelaide 36ers	Melbourne Sports and Entertainment Centre	N/A	boxscore
16/07/1989	Westside Saints	102–107	Brisbane Bullets	Melbourne Sports and Entertainment Centre	N/A	boxscore

=== Round 14 ===
Date	Home	Score	Away	Venue	Crowd	Box Score
21/07/1989	Perth Wildcats	109–114	Canberra Cannons	Challenge Stadium	N/A	boxscore
22/07/1989	Brisbane Bullets	98–89	Newcastle Falcons	Brisbane Entertainment Centre	N/A	boxscore
22/07/1989	Illawarra Hawks	152–131	Hobart Tassie Devils	Beaton Park Stadium	N/A	boxscore
22/07/1989	Eastside Spectres	103–86	North Melbourne Giants	Melbourne Sports and Entertainment Centre	N/A	boxscore
22/07/1989	Geelong Supercats	125–111	Westside Saints	Geelong Arena	N/A	boxscore
22/07/1989	Sydney Kings	94–96	Adelaide 36ers	State Sports Centre	N/A	boxscore
23/07/1989	Melbourne Tigers	121–99	Westside Saints	Melbourne Sports and Entertainment Centre	N/A	boxscore

=== Round 15 ===
Date	Home	Score	Away	Venue	Crowd	Box Score
28/07/1989	Illawarra Hawks	110–111	Eastside Spectres	Beaton Park Stadium	N/A	boxscore
28/07/1989	Sydney Kings	109–92	Geelong Supercats	State Sports Centre	N/A	boxscore
29/07/1989	Canberra Cannons	109–98	Newcastle Falcons	AIS Arena	N/A	boxscore
29/07/1989	Brisbane Bullets	127–100	Adelaide 36ers	Brisbane Entertainment Centre	N/A	boxscore

=== Round 16 ===
Date	Home	Score	Away	Venue	Crowd	Box Score
3/08/1989	Westside Saints	98–106	Hobart Tassie Devils	Melbourne Sports and Entertainment Centre	N/A	boxscore
4/08/1989	Canberra Cannons	94–89	Sydney Kings	AIS Arena	N/A	boxscore
4/08/1989	Adelaide 36ers	115–136	North Melbourne Giants	Apollo Entertainment Centre	N/A	boxscore
4/08/1989	Melbourne Tigers	122–109	Illawarra Hawks	Melbourne Sports and Entertainment Centre	N/A	boxscore
5/08/1989	Perth Wildcats	102–100	North Melbourne Giants	Challenge Stadium	N/A	boxscore
5/08/1989	Newcastle Falcons	100–105	Westside Saints	Newcastle Sports Entertainment Centre	N/A	boxscore
5/08/1989	Brisbane Bullets	110–97	Hobart Tassie Devils	Brisbane Entertainment Centre	N/A	boxscore
5/08/1989	Eastside Spectres	97–100	Sydney Kings	Melbourne Sports and Entertainment Centre	N/A	boxscore
5/08/1989	Geelong Supercats	97–115	Illawarra Hawks	Geelong Arena	N/A	boxscore

=== Round 17 ===
Date	Home	Score	Away	Venue	Crowd	Box Score
11/08/1989	Adelaide 36ers	116–111	Melbourne Tigers	Apollo Entertainment Centre	N/A	boxscore
12/08/1989	Perth Wildcats	107–103	Melbourne Tigers	Challenge Stadium	N/A	boxscore
12/08/1989	Illawarra Hawks	131–120	Sydney Kings	Beaton Park Stadium	N/A	boxscore
12/08/1989	Newcastle Falcons	98–91	Geelong Supercats	Newcastle Sports Entertainment Centre	N/A	boxscore
12/08/1989	Brisbane Bullets	104–119	North Melbourne Giants	Brisbane Entertainment Centre	N/A	boxscore
12/08/1989	Hobart Tassie Devils	105–103	Eastside Spectres	Derwent Entertainment Centre	N/A	boxscore

=== Round 18 ===
Date	Home	Score	Away	Venue	Crowd	Box Score
18/08/1989	Adelaide 36ers	120–105	Hobart Tassie Devils	Apollo Entertainment Centre	N/A	boxscore
18/08/1989	Illawarra Hawks	100–102	Newcastle Falcons	Beaton Park Stadium	N/A	boxscore
18/08/1989	North Melbourne Giants	124–120	Canberra Cannons	Melbourne Sports and Entertainment Centre	N/A	boxscore
19/08/1989	Sydney Kings	104–96	Westside Saints	State Sports Centre	N/A	boxscore
19/08/1989	Eastside Spectres	130–127	Newcastle Falcons	Melbourne Sports and Entertainment Centre	N/A	boxscore
19/08/1989	Perth Wildcats	133–113	Hobart Tassie Devils	Challenge Stadium	N/A	boxscore
19/08/1989	Geelong Supercats	91–87	Brisbane Bullets	Geelong Arena	N/A	boxscore
20/08/1989	Melbourne Tigers	116–103	Brisbane Bullets	Melbourne Sports and Entertainment Centre	N/A	boxscore

=== Round 19 ===
Date	Home	Score	Away	Venue	Crowd	Box Score
25/08/1989	Sydney Kings	111–108	Perth Wildcats	State Sports Centre	N/A	boxscore
25/08/1989	North Melbourne Giants	134–116	Illawarra Hawks	Melbourne Sports and Entertainment Centre	N/A	boxscore
26/08/1989	Newcastle Falcons	96–100	Perth Wildcats	Newcastle Sports Entertainment Centre	N/A	boxscore
26/08/1989	Brisbane Bullets	103–105	Canberra Cannons	Brisbane Entertainment Centre	N/A	boxscore
26/08/1989	Hobart Tassie Devils	107–100	Adelaide 36ers	Derwent Entertainment Centre	N/A	boxscore
26/08/1989	Melbourne Tigers	112–95	Eastside Spectres	Melbourne Sports and Entertainment Centre	N/A	boxscore
27/08/1989	Westside Saints	128–108	Illawarra Hawks	Melbourne Sports and Entertainment Centre	N/A	boxscore

=== Round 20 ===
Date	Home	Score	Away	Venue	Crowd	Box Score
31/08/1989	Westside Saints	110–89	Geelong Supercats	Melbourne Sports and Entertainment Centre	N/A	boxscore
1/09/1989	North Melbourne Giants	127–118	Brisbane Bullets	Melbourne Sports and Entertainment Centre	N/A	boxscore
1/09/1989	Hobart Tassie Devils	134–123	Perth Wildcats	Derwent Entertainment Centre	N/A	boxscore
2/09/1989	Illawarra Hawks	115–145	Canberra Cannons	Beaton Park Stadium	N/A	boxscore
2/09/1989	Newcastle Falcons	121–116	Adelaide 36ers	Newcastle Sports Entertainment Centre	N/A	boxscore
2/09/1989	Eastside Spectres	120–81	Perth Wildcats	Melbourne Sports and Entertainment Centre	N/A	boxscore
3/09/1989	Melbourne Tigers	112–87	Geelong Supercats	Melbourne Sports and Entertainment Centre	N/A	boxscore

=== Round 21 ===
Date	Home	Score	Away	Venue	Crowd	Box Score
6/09/1989	Geelong Supercats	104–112	Eastside Spectres	Geelong Arena	N/A	boxscore
8/09/1989	Perth Wildcats	120–107	Westside Saints	Challenge Stadium	N/A	boxscore
8/09/1989	Canberra Cannons	148–114	Hobart Tassie Devils	AIS Arena	N/A	boxscore
8/09/1989	Melbourne Tigers	119–129	North Melbourne Giants	Melbourne Sports and Entertainment Centre	N/A	boxscore
9/09/1989	Adelaide 36ers	112–98	Westside Saints	Apollo Entertainment Centre	N/A	boxscore
9/09/1989	Newcastle Falcons	102–97	Sydney Kings	Newcastle Sports Entertainment Centre	N/A	boxscore
9/09/1989	Eastside Spectres	113–107	Brisbane Bullets	Melbourne Sports and Entertainment Centre	N/A	boxscore
9/09/1989	Geelong Supercats	103–132	North Melbourne Giants	Geelong Arena	N/A	boxscore

=== Round 22 ===
Date	Home	Score	Away	Venue	Crowd	Box Score
14/09/1989	Westside Saints	131–127	Newcastle Falcons	Melbourne Sports and Entertainment Centre	N/A	boxscore
15/09/1989	Adelaide 36ers	113–105	Illawarra Hawks	Apollo Entertainment Centre	N/A	boxscore
15/09/1989	North Melbourne Giants	154–115	Newcastle Falcons	Melbourne Sports and Entertainment Centre	N/A	boxscore
15/09/1989	Hobart Tassie Devils	130–109	Geelong Supercats	Derwent Entertainment Centre	N/A	boxscore
16/09/1989	Perth Wildcats	123–119	Illawarra Hawks	Challenge Stadium	N/A	boxscore
16/09/1989	Canberra Cannons	106–104	Melbourne Tigers	AIS Arena	N/A	boxscore
16/09/1989	Brisbane Bullets	116–103	Sydney Kings	Brisbane Entertainment Centre	N/A	boxscore
16/09/1989	Eastside Spectres	128–97	Geelong Supercats	Melbourne Sports and Entertainment Centre	N/A	boxscore

== Ladder ==
This is the ladder at the end of season, before the finals. The top 6 teams qualified for the finals series.

Pos	1989 NBL season											
Pos	Team	Pld	W	L	PCT	Last 5	Streak	Home	Away	PF	PA	PP
1	Canberra Cannons	24	18	6	75.00%	4–1	W4	10–2	8–4	2736	2580	106.05%
2	North Melbourne Giants	24	17	7	70.33%	5–0	W7	11–1	6–6	2993	2701	110.81%
3	Perth Wildcats^{1}	24	16	8	66.67%	3–2	W2	11–1	5–7	2681	2660	100.79%
4	Melbourne Tigers^{1}	24	16	8	66.67%	3–2	L2	8–4	8–4	2802	2660	105.34%
5	Sydney Kings^{2}	24	15	9	62.50%	2–3	L2	9–3	6–6	2471	2489	99.28%
6	Adelaide 36ers^{2}	24	15	9	62.50%	3–2	W2	10–2	5–7	2778	2668	104.12%
7	Eastside Spectres	24	14	10	53.85%	4–1	W4	9–3	5–7	2527	2454	102.97%
8	Brisbane Bullets	24	11	13	45.83%	1–4	W1	7–5	4–8	2563	2492	102.85%
9	Westside Saints^{3}	24	8	16	33.33%	3–2	W1	5–7	3–9	2522	2648	95.24%
10	Hobart Tassie Devils^{3}	24	8	16	33.33%	3–2	W1	6–6	2–10	2566	2757	93.07%
11	Illawarra Hawks	24	7	17	29.17%	0–5	L6	5–7	2–10	2826	2929	96.48%
12	Newcastle Falcons	24	6	18	25.00%	2–3	L2	5–7	1–11	2649	2799	94.64%
13	Geelong Supercats	24	5	19	20.83%	0–5	L6	3–9	2–10	2445	2722	89.82%

Updated to match(es) played on 16 September 1989. Source: NBL.com.au

The NBL tie-breaker system as outlined in the NBL Rules and Regulations states that in the case of an identical win–loss record, the results in games played between the teams will determine order of seeding.

^{1}Perth Wildcats won Head-to-Head (2-0).

^{2}Head-to-Head between Sydney Kings and Adelaide 36ers (1-1). Sydney Kings won For and Against (+7).

^{3}Head-to-Head between Westside Saints and Hobart Tassie Devils (1-1). Westside Saints won For and Against (+5).

== Finals ==
=== Playoff bracket ===
Elimination Finals
4	Melbourne Tigers	105	112	83
5	Sydney Kings	117	89	85
3	Perth Wildcats	122	114	112
6	Adelaide 36ers	124	94	108

Semifinals
1	Canberra Cannons	108	92	142
5	Sydney Kings	98	100	82
2	North Melbourne Giants	129	108	165
3	Perth Wildcats	108	111	110

Grand Final
1	Canberra Cannons	105	97	X
2	North Melbourne Giants	111	111	X

There were two best of three Elimination finals, four best of three Semifinals, and then best of three grand final series.

=== Elimination Finals ===
Date	Home	Score	Away	Venue	Crowd	Box Score
20/09/1989	Sydney Kings	117–105	Melbourne Tigers	State Sports Centre	5,006	boxscore
20/09/1989	Adelaide 36ers	124–122	Perth Wildcats	Apollo Entertainment Centre	3,000	boxscore
22/09/1989	Melbourne Tigers	112–89	Sydney Kings	Melbourne Sports and Entertainment Centre	7,200	boxscore
22/09/1989	Perth Wildcats	114–94	Adelaide 36ers	Challenge Stadium	4,500	boxscore
24/09/1989	Melbourne Tigers	83–85	Sydney Kings	Melbourne Sports and Entertainment Centre	7,200	boxscore
24/09/1989	Perth Wildcats	112–108	Adelaide 36ers	Challenge Stadium	4,500	boxscore

=== Semifinals ===
Date	Home	Score	Away	Venue	Crowd	Box Score
29/09/1989	Sydney Kings	98–108	Canberra Cannons	State Sports Centre	5,006	boxscore
30/09/1989	Perth Wildcats	108–129	North Melbourne Giants	Challenge Stadium	4,500	boxscore
6/10/1989	Canberra Cannons	92–100	Sydney Kings	AIS Arena	5,200	boxscore
6/10/1989	North Melbourne Giants	108–111	Perth Wildcats	Melbourne Sports and Entertainment Centre	7,200	boxscore
8/10/1989	Canberra Cannons	142–82	Sydney Kings	AIS Arena	5,200	boxscore
8/10/1989	North Melbourne Giants	165–110	Perth Wildcats	Melbourne Sports and Entertainment Centre	7,200	boxscore

=== Grand Final ===
Date	Home	Score	Away	Venue	Crowd	Box Score
14/10/1989	Canberra Cannons	105–111	North Melbourne Giants	AIS Arena	5,200	boxscore
20/10/1989	North Melbourne Giants	111–97	Canberra Cannons	Melbourne Sports and Entertainment Centre	7,200	boxscore

== 1989 NBL statistics leaders ==
Category	Player	Team	Stat
Points per game	Andrew Gaze	Melbourne Tigers	34.5
Rebounds per game	Dean Uthoff	Eastside Spectres	17.0
Assists per game	Andrew Gaze	Melbourne Tigers	7.2
Steals per game	Phil Smyth	Canberra Cannons	3.3
Blocks per game	Willie Simmons	Canberra Cannons	3.2
Free throw percentage	Scott Fisher	North Melbourne Giants	87.5%

== NBL awards ==
- Most Valuable Player: Scott Fisher, North Melbourne Giants
- Most Valuable Player Grand Final: Scott Fisher, North Melbourne Giants
- Best Defensive Player: Phil Smyth, Canberra Cannons
- Most Improved Player: Mark Bradtke, Adelaide 36ers
- Rookie of the Year: Justin Withers, Illawarra Hawks
- Coach of the Year: Lindsay Gaze, Melbourne Tigers

== All NBL Team ==
#	Player	Team
PG	Phil Smyth	Canberra Cannons
SG	Kent Lockhart	Eastside Spectres
SF	Andrew Gaze	Melbourne Tigers
PF	Scott Fisher	North Melbourne Giants
C	Mark Davis	Adelaide 36ers
