= Kingborough Sports Centre =

Indoor sports venue in Kingston, Tasmania

- KSC
- Location within Hobart
- Location: Kingston View Drive via Summerleas Road, Kingston, Hobart, Tasmania 7010
- Coordinates: 42°58′18″S 147°17′11″E
- Owner: Kingborough Council
- Operator: Kingborough Council
- Capacity: 1,800 (seated)
- Surface: Hardwood indoor courts, synthetic multi-use flooring

Construction
- Groundbreaking: 1978
- Opened: 1979
- Cost: $1.3 million AUD

Tenants
- Tasmania JackJumpers (Training; 2021–2026); Hobart Devils (NBL) (1983–1988); Hobart Islanders (WNBL) (1986–1996); Hobart Chargers (SEABL / NBL1 South) (1981–2016, 2021); Hobart Huskies (NBL1 South) (2019); Tasmania Wild (Super Netball Reserves) (2023–present)

The Kingborough Sports Centre (KSC) is a multi-purpose indoor sports venue located in Kingston, a southern suburb of Hobart, Tasmania. Owned and operated by the Kingborough Council, the complex serves as a primary hub for regional and state basketball, netball, volleyball, gymnastics, and martial arts.

== History ==
Work began in 1978 on a four-level sports complex that was finished in 1979 at a cost of $1.3 million. Built to accommodate both grassroots and high-performance sport, the centre has undergone multiple refurbishments to remain a pivotal fixture in Tasmanian sporting history.

The venue was first utilised by the National Basketball League (NBL) during the 1983 NBL season, when the Hobart Devils defeated the Devonport Warriors 85–40 in their NBL debut on 12 February 1983. The Devils played their home fixtures at KSC between 1983 and 1988, establishing the venue as the primary southern Tasmania basketball hub, before eventually shifting high-capacity fixtures to the purpose-built Derwent Entertainment Centre in 1989.

From 1986 to 1996, KSC was home to the Hobart Islanders in the Women's National Basketball League (WNBL). On 14 September 1991, KSC was the site of Tasmania's only WNBL championship victory to date, when the Islanders defeated the Melbourne East Spectres 67–64 in front of a packed home crowd.

The Hobart Chargers in the South East Australian Basketball League (SEABL) initially played at KSC, winning three South Conference titles in 1997, 1998, and 2000 before shifting closer to the city centre. The Hobart Huskies played their home matches in NBL1 at KSC during 2019, and the Chargers returned to host regular season games at KSC in 2021.

Following their entry into the NBL in 2021, the Tasmania JackJumpers utilised KSC as their administrative and training hub. The franchise trained at the centre until July 2026, when they transitioned across the road to a purpose-built $20 million high-performance facility on Kingston View Drive.

== Other events ==
In addition to basketball, the centre hosts regular fixtures for the Tasmania Wild in the Super Netball Reserves, state martial arts championships, gymnastics exhibitions, regional trade expos, and community events hosted by the Kingborough Council.

== Highest-attended events ==
External videos
- ABC (Hobart)
- WNBL 1991 Grand Final: Hobart Islanders vs Melbourne East Spectres (14 September 1991)

Notable High-Attendance Events at Kingborough Sports Centre
Event / Match	Date / Year	Sport / Type	Est. Attendance	Notes
1991 WNBL Grand Final (Islanders vs. Spectres)	14 September 1991	Basketball	~2,000	Sold-out venue record crowd for Tasmania's sole WNBL title victory (67–64).
NBL Regular Season (Devils vs. Perth Wildcats)	7 August 1987	Basketball	~2,000	Standing-room overflow crowd during the peak Devils era at KSC.
SEABL South Conference Grand Final (Chargers vs. Knox)	September 1998	Basketball	~1,850	Capacity sellout crowd for the Chargers' SEABL conference championship win.
