= Canberra Cannons =

Defunct basketball team from Canberra, Australia

- Leagues: NBL
- Founded: 1979; 47 years ago
- Dissolved: 2003
- History: Canberra Cannons; 1979–2003; Hunter Pirates; 2003–2006; Singapore Slingers; 2006–present
- Arena: AIS Arena
- Capacity: 5,200
- Location: Canberra, Australian Capital Territory
- Team colors: Navy, red, white
- Championships: 3 (1983, 1984, 1988)
Home	Away

The Canberra Cannons were a professional men's basketball team that competed in Australia's National Basketball League (NBL). They went into financial administration in 2003 and were relocated to Newcastle, where they became the Hunter Pirates. After this venture also folded the team was relocated to Singapore and played as the Singapore Slingers for the 2006–07 season.

The Cannons were runners-up in the inaugural 1979 competition and then won three championships in 1983, 1984 and 1988. They were also runners-up in 1989.

== History ==
The Cannons were one of the original ten NBL clubs, competing in the league's very first season in 1979. They reached the championship game with a 13–5 record, but fell at the final hurdle, losing to the St Kilda Saints 94–93 in the final.

Canberra failed to make the playoffs over the next few seasons, but in 1983 they won their first NBL championship, downing the defending champions the West Adelaide Bearcats 75–73 in the Grand Final. Adelaide born Guard Phil Smyth joined the team in 1983 and led the NBL in steals and assists as well as being selected at Point guard in the All-NBL Team.

In 1983, the Cannons' trio of Wade Kirchmeyer, Dave Nelson and Garry Ball were dubbed the "Bruise Brothers". Following the league's import reduction from three to two, Kirchmeyer was not re-signed for 1984.

The Cannons repeated as champions in 1984, this time beating the Brisbane Bullets 84–82 in the big game. Smyth again had a big season, being named to the All-NBL Team.

Canberra made the playoffs for the next three seasons but would fall to the Bullets in the semi-finals each time. Championship glory eluded the Cannons until 1988, when swept the minor premiers the Adelaide 36ers in the semi-finals then beat the North Melbourne Giants 2–1 in a best-of-three championship series. Smyth again was named to the All-NBL Team after leading the league in three-point percentage, free-throw percentage and steals, and was also named Best Defensive Player. Smyth also won the Grand Final MVP after averaging 23.3 points, 3.6 rebounds and 5.6 assists over the series. 7 ft 0 in (213 cm) import centre Willie Simmons also led the league in blocks, averaging 3.6 per game.

North Melbourne exacted their revenge in 1989, beating the Cannons 2–0 in the championship series. It would prove to be the last time the Cannons played in the NBL Grand Final.

The Cannons failed to make the playoffs again until 1992, when they were eliminated in the first round by the eventual champions, the South East Melbourne Magic. They reached the playoffs in 1996 making the semi-finals before being eliminated by the Melbourne Tigers 2–1. They again made the finals in 1997 but were eliminated in the first round 2–1 by North Melbourne.

Financial problems dogged the club in the late 1990s, and the team finally succumbed to its money woes in December 2002. The club managed to play all its remaining games from the 2002–03 NBL season, but were unable to hold on to their star players, including C. J. Bruton, the son of then-coach Cal Bruton, or any imports. Canberra finished with an 11–19 record, and the team was bought by a consortium that moved the team to Newcastle.

During the 2002 off-season, the Cannons embarked on a short tour of the United States playing various college teams. On one occasion they played against the Michigan State Spartans at the Breslin Center in Lansing. For that game, the Cannons featured former Michigan State player, NBA legend with the Los Angeles Lakers and one of the most decorated players in basketball history, Earvin "Magic" Johnson. The game, a celebration of Johnson's induction into the Hall of Fame in 2002, saw the Cannons defeat the Spartans (who featured future NBL player Adam Ballinger) 104–85 with Magic contributing 12 points, 10 assists and 10 rebounds.

In April 2022, NBL owner Larry Kestelman flagged Canberra as a potential 11th team. Kestelman says "Canberra could be next in line for a league license, following the same model as the Tasmania JackJumpers".

== Honour Roll ==
NBL Championships:	3 (1983, 1984, 1988)
NBL Finals Appearances:	11 (1979, 1983, 1984, 1985, 1986, 1987, 1988, 1989, 1992, 1996, 1997)
NBL Grand Final appearances:	5 (1979, 1983, 1984, 1988, 1989)
NBL Most Valuable Players:	None
NBL Grand Final MVPs:	Phil Smyth (1988)
All-NBL First Team:	Herb McEachin (1980), Cal Stamp (1980), Dave Nelson (1981), Phil Smyth (1983, 1984, 1988, 1989), Robert Rose (1996, 1997)
All-NBL Second Team:	Phil Smyth (1985), Emery Atkinson (1989), Simon Dwight (1997)
All-NBL Third Team:	Rodney Monroe (1993), Ray Borner (1995), Jervaughn Scales (1995)
NBL Coach of the Year:	Bob Turner (1985), Brett Flanigan (1996)
NBL Rookie of the Year:	Jamie Kennedy (1983), Lachlan Armfield (1992), Damien Ryan (1999)
NBL Most Improved Player:	None
NBL Best Defensive Player:	Phil Smyth (1983, 1988, 1989)

== Season by season ==
NBL champions	League champions	Runners-up	Finals berth

Season	Tier	League	Regular season					Post-season	Head coach	Captain
Season	Tier	League	Finish	Played	Wins	Losses	Win %	Post-season	Head coach	Captain
Canberra Cannons
1979	1	NBL	2nd	18	13	5	.722	Lost NBL final (St. Kilda) 93–94	Cal Stamp	Ian Ellis
1980	1	NBL	7th	22	11	11	.500	Did not qualify	Cal Stamp	Ian Ellis
1981	1	NBL	7th	22	12	10	.545	Did not qualify	Patrick Hunt	Ian Ellis
1982	1	NBL	11th	26	8	18	.308	Did not qualify	Ian Ellis	Herb McEachin
1983	1	NBL	2nd	22	16	6	.727	Qualified round robin 3–0; Won semifinal (Coburg) 80–75; Won NBL final (West Adelaide) 75–73	Bob Turner	Dave Nelson
1984	1	NBL	2nd	23	16	7	.696	Won preliminary final (Geelong) 87–81; Won semifinal (Coburg) 108–107; Won NBL final (Brisbane) 84–82	Bob Turner	Dave Nelson
1985	1	NBL	4th	26	19	7	.731	Won elimination final (Coburg) 110–87; Lost semifinal (Brisbane) 76–93	Bob Turner	Dave Nelson
1986	1	NBL	2nd	26	19	7	.731	Lost semifinal (Brisbane) 100–120	Bob Turner	Herb McEachin; Phil Smyth
1987	1	NBL	5th	26	17	9	.654	Lost elimination final (Perth) 96–101	Jerry Lee	Phil Smyth
1988	1	NBL	4th	24	16	8	.667	Won elimination final (Newcastle) 107–92; Won semifinals (Adelaide) 2–0; Won NBL finals (North Melbourne) 2–1	Jerry Lee	Phil Smyth
1989	1	NBL	1st	24	18	6	.750	Won semifinals (Sydney) 2–1; Lost NBL finals (North Melbourne) 0–2	Steve Breheny	Phil Smyth
1990	1	NBL	7th	26	16	10	.615	Did not qualify	Steve Breheny	Phil Smyth
1991	1	NBL	10th	26	9	17	.346	Did not qualify	Mel Dalgleish	Phil Smyth
1992	1	NBL	8th	24	11	13	.458	Lost quarterfinals (S.E. Melbourne) 0–2	Barry Barnes	Phil Smyth
1993	1	NBL	9th	26	12	14	.462	Did not qualify	Barry Barnes	Simon Cottrell
1994	1	NBL	11th	26	7	19	.269	Did not qualify	Barry Barnes	Simon Cottrell; Justin Withers
1995	1	NBL	9th	26	12	14	.462	Did not qualify	Brett Flanigan	Fred Cofield
1996	1	NBL	4th	26	16	10	.615	Won quarterfinals (Sydney) 2–1; Lost semifinals (Melbourne) 1–2	Brett Flanigan	Robert Rose
1997	1	NBL	6th	30	15	15	.500	Lost quarterfinals (North Melbourne) 1–2	Brett Flanigan	Robert Rose
1998	1	NBL	7th	30	14	16	.467	Did not qualify	Brett Flanigan	Robert Rose
1998–99	1	NBL	11th	26	8	18	.308	Did not qualify	Brett Flanigan	Jamie Pearlman
1999–2000	1	NBL	8th	28	11	17	.393	Did not qualify	Brett Flanigan; Cal Bruton	Jamie Pearlman
2000–01	1	NBL	11th	28	3	25	.107	Did not qualify	Cal Bruton	Jayson Wells
2001–02	1	NBL	10th	30	12	18	.400	Did not qualify	Cal Bruton	C. J. Bruton; Brad Williams
2002–03	1	NBL	8th	30	11	19	.367	Did not qualify	Cal Bruton; Lloyd Klaman	C. J. Bruton; Brad Williams
Regular season record				641	322	319	.502	1 regular season champions		
Finals record				35	20	15	.571	3 NBL championships		

As of the end of the 2002–03 season

*Note: In 1983 and 1984, the NBL was split into Eastern and Western divisions during the regular season.
