= Melbourne Sports and Entertainment Centre =

Sports administration and training facility

Coordinates: 37°49′27″S 144°58′47″E

KGM Centre
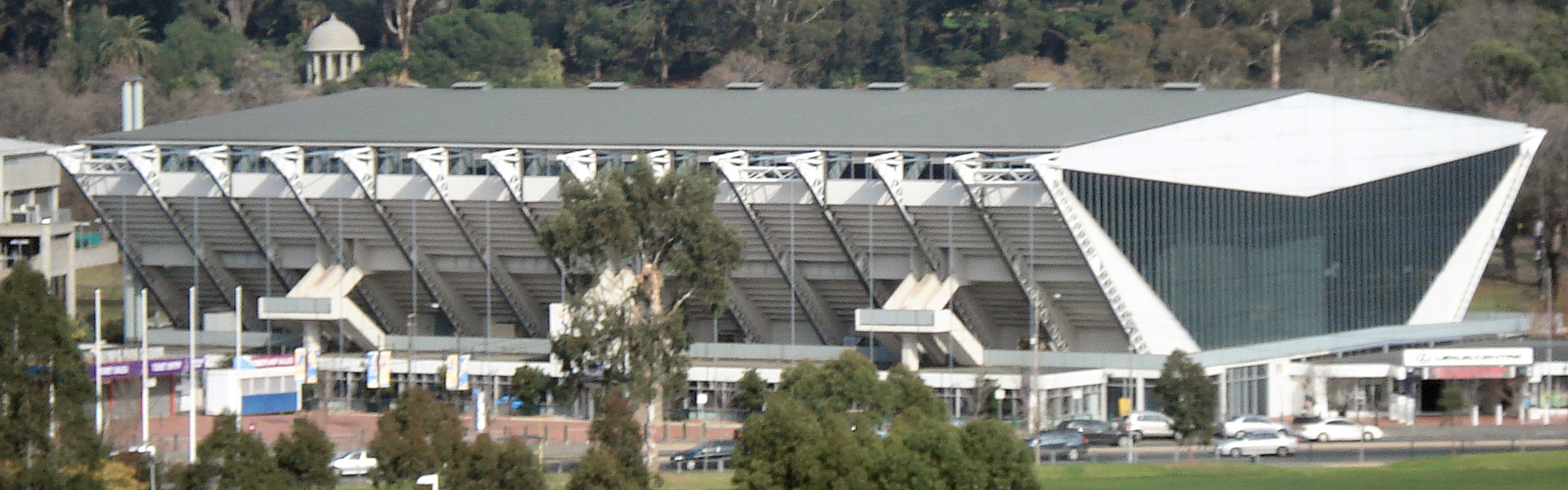
- Interactive map of KGM Centre
- Former names: Swimming and Diving Stadium (1956); Olympic Swimming Stadium (1957–1983); Melbourne Sports and Entertainment Centre (1983–1998); Lexus Centre (2004–2010); Westpac Centre (2010–2015); Holden Centre (2015–2022); AIA Vitality Centre (2022–2025)
- Location: Olympic Blvd and Batman Ave; Olympic Park; Melbourne, VIC 3000; Australia
- Owner: Melbourne & Olympic Parks Trust
- Capacity: 7,200 (1983–1998); 5,500 (Original)

Construction
- Groundbreaking: October 1954
- Opened: 22 November 1956
- Renovated: 1983, 2003, 2013
- Cost: £350,000 $10.5 million (1983 renovation) $20 million (2003 renovation)
- Architects: Kevin Borland, Peter McIntyre and John and Phyllis Murphy
- Structural engineer: Bill Irwin
- General contractors: McDougall & Ireland

Tenants
- 1956 Olympic Games; North Melbourne Giants (NBL) (1984-98); Melbourne Tigers (NBL) (1984-91); Eastside Spectres (NBL) (1987-91); Southern Melbourne Saints (NBL) (1987-91); Collingwood Football Club (Administration & Training facility) (2004-present); Victorian Institute of Sport (Administration & Training facility) (2003-present)

Website
- Venue Website

The Melbourne Sports and Entertainment Centre (originally known as the Swimming and Diving Stadium and now known commercially as the KGM Centre) is a sports administration and training facility located in the Melbourne Sports and Entertainment Precinct in Melbourne, Australia. The facility opened in 1956 as an aquatic centre for the 1956 Olympic Games. In 1983, the Olympic-sized pool was replaced with a parquetry floor and the facility became Melbourne's home of numerous basketball events until 1998, most notably as the home venue for several National Basketball League teams including the North Melbourne Giants and Melbourne Tigers. The venue served as Melbourne's primary indoor concert arena from 1984 to 1988, until completion of the Rod Laver Arena.

The centre is the administrative and training headquarters of the Collingwood Football Club, who also train on the adjacent Olympic Park Oval.

== History ==
=== 1956 Olympic Games ===
Known originally as the Swimming and Diving Stadium, it was built as an indoor aquatic centre for diving, swimming, water polo, and the swimming part of the modern pentathlon events for the 1956 Summer Olympics. It was the first fully indoor Olympic swimming venue in an Olympic Games and is the only major stadium structure from the 1956 Olympic Games with the facade intact. It is listed on the Victorian Heritage Register. The design of this building was the winner of one of three international competitions held in 1952 to provide stadia for the 1956 Olympic Games. Architects Kevin Borland, Peter McIntyre, John and Phyllis Murphy and their engineer Bill Irwin won the only one of these competitions to be consummated. Construction by McDougall & Ireland, one of Melbourne's then-largest construction companies, began in October 1954 and was completed in 1956, just prior to the commencement of the Melbourne Olympic Games.

Artist Arthur Boyd created Totem Pole, the ceramic pylon sculptural work outside the complex, at his AMB Pottery in Murrumbeena.

=== Basketball ===
After redevelopment in the 1980s, the venue became the Melbourne Sports and Entertainment Centre. It hosted home games for the National Basketball League's North Melbourne Giants, as well as the Melbourne Tigers, Eastside Spectres and Westside Melbourne Saints, as well as hosting international games between the Australian Boomers and various visiting international teams including the Soviet Union who played there in 1987. The Giants remained at The Glass House until their final season in 1998. The Tigers moved to the 15,400 capacity (for basketball) National Tennis Centre at Flinders Park in 1992,

From 1984 until 1986, The Glass house with its 7,200 capacity was the largest venue used in the NBL. Its position was taken when the Brisbane Bullets moved into the 13,500 seat Brisbane Entertainment Centre in mid-1986. By the time of the venue's last NBL game on Friday 5 June 1998 which saw the Giants defeat the Perth Wildcats 109–103, The Glass House was still the 4th largest venue in use, though having opened in 1956 it was also the oldest.

The North Melbourne Giants won the NBL Championship at The Glass House in 1989 when they defeated the Canberra Cannons 2–0 in the Grand Final series, reversing the result of the 1988 NBL Grand Final when they had lost to the Cannons. They won their second and last title in 1994 when they defeated the Adelaide 36ers, again 2–0 in the best of three series.

The Glass House also hosted the NBL All-Star Game in 1988, 1989, 1991.

=== Collingwood Football Club ===
Collingwood Football Club moved its administrative and training facilities from Victoria Park to the Melbourne Sports and Entertainment Centre in 2004. The Collingwood Football Club also used Olympic Park Stadium being adjacent to the centre as its outdoor training facility from 2004 until 2012, when it was demolished. After this occurred, Collingwood Football Club moved its outdoor training ground to the newly developed Olympic Park Oval that replaced the space of the stadium after demolition.

== Sponsorship and naming rights arrangements ==
The luxury vehicle manufacturer Lexus bought the naming rights to the venue in 2004; as the Lexus Centre, it no longer served as a public stadium, instead being used by the Victorian Institute of Sport and the Collingwood Football Club as a sports administration and training facility. The Lexus Centre was listed as part of the Melbourne Sports and Entertainment Precinct. On 21 November 2009, Collingwood Football Club announced publicly on the official AFL website that Lexus would no longer continue to maintain the rights of naming the centre. Lexus announced in a statement that "the branding exercise had achieved its marketing objectives and was no longer a priority in its marketing strategy", hence ending a six-year naming rights deal between Lexus and Collingwood. In March, 2010, Collingwood announced that Westpac bank was the new naming rights sponsor of the centre.

On 19 August 2015, Holden signed a multimillion-dollar three-year deal to become a Premier Partner of Collingwood and holder of the naming rights to the club's headquarters at Olympic Park, now known as the Holden Centre.

In March 2022, American International Assurance Company (Australia) (known as AIA) was announced as the new naming rights partner. The centre was thus renamed the AIA Centre. The arrangement lasted until October 2025, when the venue was renamed the KGM Centre in recognition of the club's new sponsorship agreement with Korean automaker KG Mobility.

== Awards and recognition ==
The Swimming and Diving Stadium received an Engineering Heritage International Marker from Engineers Australia as part of its Engineering Heritage Recognition Program. In 2021 the Australian Institute of Architects gave the project the Victoria Chapter's Maggie Edmond Enduring Architecture Award and later awarded the National Award for Enduring Architecture in the same year.
