= Southern Melbourne Saints =

Defunct basketball team in Melbourne, Australia

- Leagues: NBL
- Founded: 1979
- Dissolved: 1991
- History: St. Kilda Saints; 1979–1986; Westside Saints; 1987–1990; Southern Melbourne Saints; 1991
- Arena: Albert Park Basketball Stadium (1979–83); The Glass House (1984–86, 1991); Keilor Stadium (1987–90)
- Capacity: APBS - 2,000; TGH - 7,200; Keilor - 2,000
- Location: Melbourne, Victoria
- Team colors: Black, white, red
- Championships: 2 (1979, 1980)

The Southern Melbourne Saints, previously known as the St. Kilda Saints and Westside Saints, were an Australian professional basketball team based in Melbourne. The Saints competed in the National Basketball League (NBL) between 1979 and 1991.

== History ==
St. Kilda was one of the ten inaugural, foundation teams of the NBL that competed in the league's first season in 1979, operating out of Albert Park Basketball Stadium at the time. Historically known as the St. Kilda Saints during this time, the team was referred to as St. Kilda Pumas by the media in 1979, 1980 and 1981.

St. Kilda was the powerhouse team over the league's first three seasons behind coach Brian Kerle, winning three straight minor premierships and claiming the first two NBL championships. In 1981, after finishing the regular season in first place, St. Kilda decided to compete in the FIBA Club World Cup in Brazil rather than contest the NBL finals. The team never regained this level of success, as they failed to qualify for the semi-finals for the rest of their tenure in the NBL.

In 1987, the team changed their name to incorporate a wider area of Melbourne rather than just the suburb of St Kilda, rebranding as the Westside Saints and moving to Keilor Stadium. In 1991, the team changed their name again, this time to the Southern Melbourne Saints.

Prior to the 1992 season, the Saints merged with the Eastside Spectres to become the South East Melbourne Magic.

== Honour roll ==
NBL Championships:	2 (1979, 1980)
NBL finals appearances:	2 (1980, 1983)
NBL Grand Final appearances:	2 (1979, 1980)
NBL Most Valuable Player:	Rocky Smith (1980)
NBL Grand Final MVP:	Larry Sengstock (1979), Rocky Smith (1980)
All-NBL First Team:	Danny Morseu (1980, 1981), Rocky Smith (1981), Phil Smyth (1982)
NBL Coach of the Year:	None
NBL Rookie of the Year:	None
NBL Most Improved Player:	Andrew Parkinson (1991)
NBL Best Defensive Player:	Phil Smyth (1982)
NBL Best Sixth Man:	None

== Season by season ==
NBL champions	League champions	Runners-up	Finals berth

Season	Tier	League	Regular season					Post-season	Head coach
Season	Tier	League	Finish	Played	Wins	Losses	Win %	Post-season	Head coach
St. Kilda Saints
1979	1	NBL	1st	18	15	3	.833	Won NBL final (Canberra) 94–93	Brian Kerle
1980	1	NBL	1st	22	17	5	.773	Won semifinal (Nunawading) 101–77; Won NBL final (West Adelaide) 113–88	Brian Kerle
1981	1	NBL	1st	22	17	5	.773	1981 FIBA Club World Cup*	Brian Kerle
1982	1	NBL	6th	26	17	9	.654	Did not qualify	Brian Kerle
1983	1	NBL	4th	22	12	10	.545	Eliminated round robin 0–3	Brian Kerle
1984	1	NBL	5th	23	9	14	.391	Did not qualify	Andris Blicavs
1985	1	NBL	10th	26	10	16	.385	Did not qualify	Andris Blicavs
1986	1	NBL	14th	26	5	21	.192	Did not qualify	Andris Blicavs
Westside Saints
1987	1	NBL	13th	26	4	22	.154	Did not qualify	Andris Blicavs
1988	1	NBL	11th	24	9	15	.375	Did not qualify	Andris Blicavs
1989	1	NBL	9th	24	8	16	.333	Did not qualify	Colin Cadee
1990	1	NBL	14th	26	3	23	.115	Did not qualify	Dean Templeton
Southern Melbourne Saints
1991	1	NBL	11th	26	9	17	.346	Did not qualify	Gary Fox
Regular season record				311	135	176	.434	3 regular season champions	
Finals record				6	3	3	.500	2 NBL championships	

As of the end of the 1991 season

*Note: In 1981, the St. Kilda Saints did not compete in the playoffs, choosing to compete at the World Club Championships in Brazil.

*Note: In 1983 and 1984, the NBL was split into Eastern and Western divisions during the regular season.

Source: Southern Melbourne Saints Year by Year
