= Keilor Stadium =

Indoor arena in Melbourne, Victoria

- Interactive map of Keilor Stadium
- Location: Stadium Drive, Keilor Park, Melbourne, Victoria
- Coordinates: 37°42′48″S 144°50′54″E
- Capacity: 2,000+

Construction
- Groundbreaking: 1986
- Opened: 1986
- Cost: 6.5 million

Tenants
- Westside Saints (NBL) (1987–1990); Keilor Basketball Association; St Albans Caroline Springs Netball Association

Keilor Stadium is an Australian indoor arena that caters to both basketball and netball. It is located in Keilor Park, a north-western suburb of Melbourne, Victoria.

From 1987 until 1990, the stadium was the home of National Basketball League team the Westside Melbourne Saints.

In 2015, a AU$6.5 million refurbishment of the almost 30 year old stadium was completed with 3 extra courts being built. The new courts were officially opened on 7 December.
