= Beaton Park Stadium =

Basketball centre in Gwynneville, New South Wales

- Snakepit Stadium
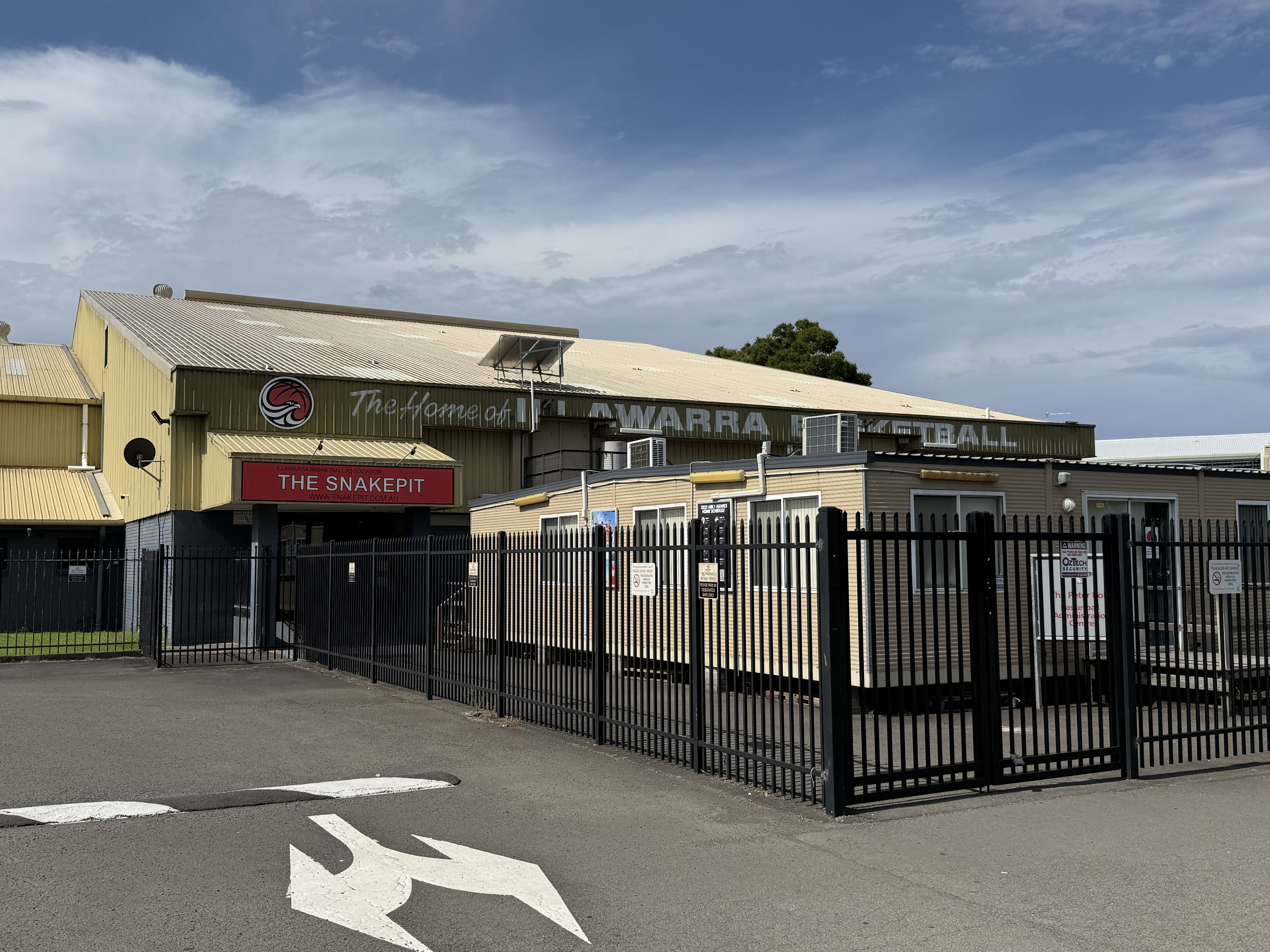
- The Snakepit Stadium, December 2025
- Location: Gwynneville, New South Wales
- Capacity: 1,500

Construction
- Opened: 1965

Tenant
- Illawarra Hawks (NBL) (1979–1998)

Beaton Park Stadium, also known as Snakepit Stadium, is an Australian basketball stadium in Gwynneville, New South Wales. It was the home of National Basketball League side Illawarra Hawks between 1979 and 1998, and is the home of Basketball Illawarra.

== History ==
After the stadium's construction in 1965, a game between Illawarra and the Sydney Paratels opened the stadium.

In 1979 the stadium was used as the Illawarra Hawks home stadium during the inaugural season of the National Basketball League. The Hawks remained at the venue until the opening of the 6,000 seat Wollongong Entertainment Centre in 1998, though they continue to train at the stadium and use it for pre-season games.

The stadium has hosted multiple Australia Boomers and Opals exhibition games, as well as the Harlem Globetrotters, the United States women's national basketball team and multiple NCAA college teams.
