= 1991 NBL season =

- League: National Basketball League
- Sport: Basketball
- Duration: 6 April – 22 September 1991; 25 September – 11 October 1991 (Finals); 19 – 27 October 1991 (Grand Finals)
- Teams: 14
- TV partner: Seven Network

Regular season
- Season champions: Perth Wildcats
- Season MVP: Andrew Gaze (Melbourne)
- Top scorer: Andrew Gaze (Melbourne)

Finals
- Champions: Perth Wildcats (2nd title)
- Runners-up: Eastside Spectres
- Finals MVP: Peter Hansen (Perth)

NBL seasons
- ← 1990 1992 →

The 1991 NBL season was the 13th season of competition since its establishment in 1979. A total of 14 teams contested the league.

== Clubs ==
Club	Location	Home Venue	Capacity	Founded	Head coach
Adelaide 36ers	Adelaide, South Australia	Apollo Stadium	3,000	1982	(Australia) Don Shipway
Brisbane Bullets	Brisbane, Queensland	Brisbane Entertainment Centre	13,500	1979	(Australia) Brian Kerle
Canberra Cannons	Canberra, Australian Capital Territory	AIS Arena	5,200	1979	(Australia) Mel Dalgleish
Eastside Spectres	(Victoria (state)) Melbourne, Victoria	Burwood Stadium	2,000	1979	(United States) Brian Goorjian
Geelong Supercats	(Victoria (state)) Geelong, Victoria	Geelong Arena	2,000	1982	(Australia) Barry Barnes
Gold Coast Rollers	Gold Coast, Queensland	Carrara Indoor Stadium	2,992	1990	(Australia) Dave Claxton
Hobart Tassie Devils	Hobart, Tasmania	Derwent Entertainment Centre	5,400	1983	
Illawarra Hawks	Wollongong, New South Wales	Illawarra Basketball Stadium	2,000	1979	(Australia) Dave Lindstrom
Melbourne Tigers	(Victoria (state)) Melbourne, Victoria	The Glass House	7,200	1931	(Australia) Lindsay Gaze
Newcastle Falcons	Newcastle, New South Wales	Broadmeadow Basketball Stadium	2,200	1979	
North Melbourne Giants	(Victoria (state)) Melbourne, Victoria	The Glass House	7,200	1980	(United States) Bruce Palmer
Perth Wildcats	Perth, Western Australia	Perth Entertainment Centre	8,200	1982	(United States) Murray Arnold
Southern Melbourne Saints	(Victoria (state)) Melbourne, Victoria	The Glass House	7,200	1979	(United States) Gary Fox
Sydney Kings	Sydney, New South Wales	Sydney Entertainment Centre	12,500	1988	(United States) Bob Turner

On 5 March 1991, the NBL board revoked the Gold Coast Cougars' licence due to liquidity issues faced by the club's then-owner, John Minuzzo. A new consortium acquired the franchise on 24 March, but Minuzzo retained the rights to the Cougars name and identity. With the season imminent and unable to secure the original branding, the new ownership adopted the name "Gold Coast Rollers" and selected green, blue, and white as the team's colours in the week leading up to the season's commencement.

== Regular season ==
The 1991 regular season took place over 24 rounds between 6 April 1991 and 22 September 1991.

1991 saw Melbourne Tigers superstar Andrew Gaze became the first player to score 1,000 points in an NBL regular season. He scored 1,007 points in 26 games at 38.7 points per game. For his efforts he was awarded the first of what would eventually become a league record seven NBL Most Valuable Player awards as well as his 6th straight selection to the All NBL team.

=== Round 1 ===
Date	Home	Score	Away	Venue	Crowd	Boxscore
6/04/1991	Brisbane Bullets	126–119	North Melbourne Giants	Brisbane Entertainment Centre	N/A	boxscore
6/04/1991	Southern Melbourne Saints	108–106	Newcastle Falcons	Melbourne Sports and Entertainment Centre	N/A	boxscore
6/04/1991	Illawarra Hawks	93–97	Canberra Cannons	Beaton Park Stadium	N/A	boxscore
7/04/1991	Melbourne Tigers	122–111	Eastside Spectres	Melbourne Sports and Entertainment Centre	N/A	boxscore

=== Round 2 ===
Date	Home	Score	Away	Venue	Crowd	Boxscore
12/04/1991	Adelaide 36ers	130–118	Illawarra Hawks	Apollo Entertainment Centre	N/A	boxscore
12/04/1991	Sydney Kings	97–116	Melbourne Tigers	Sydney Entertainment Centre	N/A	boxscore
12/04/1991	Newcastle Falcons	104–102	Hobart Tassie Devils	Newcastle Sports Entertainment Centre	N/A	boxscore
12/04/1991	North Melbourne Giants	112–109	Geelong Supercats	Melbourne Sports and Entertainment Centre	N/A	boxscore
13/04/1991	Perth Wildcats	120–91	Illawarra Hawks	Perth Entertainment Centre	N/A	boxscore
13/04/1991	Canberra Cannons	105–97	Hobart Tassie Devils	AIS Arena	N/A	boxscore
13/04/1991	Eastside Spectres	119–110	Geelong Supercats	Melbourne Sports and Entertainment Centre	N/A	boxscore
13/04/1991	Gold Coast Rollers	120–109	Melbourne Tigers	Carrara Indoor Stadium	N/A	boxscore
14/04/1991	Southern Melbourne Saints	133–102	Brisbane Bullets	Melbourne Sports and Entertainment Centre	N/A	boxscore

=== Round 3 ===
Date	Home	Score	Away	Venue	Crowd	Boxscore
19/04/1991	Southern Melbourne Saints	110–107	Perth Wildcats	Melbourne Sports and Entertainment Centre	N/A	boxscore
20/04/1991	Brisbane Bullets	149–143	Adelaide 36ers	Brisbane Entertainment Centre	N/A	boxscore
20/04/1991	Sydney Kings	95–100	North Melbourne Giants	Sydney Entertainment Centre	N/A	boxscore
20/04/1991	Newcastle Falcons	121–105	Canberra Cannons	Newcastle Sports Entertainment Centre	N/A	boxscore
20/04/1991	Melbourne Tigers	113–102	Hobart Tassie Devils	Melbourne Sports and Entertainment Centre	N/A	boxscore
21/04/1991	Geelong Supercats	105–110	Perth Wildcats	Geelong Arena	N/A	boxscore

=== Round 4 ===
Date	Home	Score	Away	Venue	Crowd	Boxscore
26/04/1991	Perth Wildcats	114–80	Newcastle Falcons	Perth Entertainment Centre	N/A	boxscore
26/04/1991	Canberra Cannons	115–92	Gold Coast Rollers	AIS Arena	N/A	boxscore
26/04/1991	North Melbourne Giants	141–103	Southern Melbourne Saints	Melbourne Sports and Entertainment Centre	N/A	boxscore
26/04/1991	Hobart Tassie Devils	116–99	Sydney Kings	Derwent Entertainment Centre	N/A	boxscore
27/04/1991	Adelaide 36ers	126–119	Newcastle Falcons	Apollo Entertainment Centre	N/A	boxscore
27/04/1991	Brisbane Bullets	106–126	Geelong Supercats	Brisbane Entertainment Centre	N/A	boxscore
27/04/1991	Illawarra Hawks	117–131	Gold Coast Rollers	Beaton Park Stadium	N/A	boxscore
27/04/1991	Eastside Spectres	148–103	Southern Melbourne Saints	Melbourne Sports and Entertainment Centre	N/A	boxscore
28/04/1991	Melbourne Tigers	102–90	Sydney Kings	Melbourne Sports and Entertainment Centre	N/A	boxscore

=== Round 5 ===
Date	Home	Score	Away	Venue	Crowd	Boxscore
2/05/1991	Southern Melbourne Saints	122–116	Illawarra Hawks	Melbourne Sports and Entertainment Centre	N/A	boxscore
3/05/1991	Adelaide 36ers	99–98	Hobart Tassie Devils	Apollo Entertainment Centre	N/A	boxscore
3/05/1991	Canberra Cannons	117–118	Melbourne Tigers	AIS Arena	N/A	boxscore
3/05/1991	North Melbourne Giants	104–109	Brisbane Bullets	Melbourne Sports and Entertainment Centre	N/A	boxscore
3/05/1991	Geelong Supercats	145–104	Illawarra Hawks	Geelong Arena	N/A	boxscore
4/05/1991	Perth Wildcats	105–90	Hobart Tassie Devils	Perth Entertainment Centre	N/A	boxscore
4/05/1991	Newcastle Falcons	127–132	Melbourne Tigers	Newcastle Sports Entertainment Centre	N/A	boxscore
4/05/1991	Eastside Spectres	117–134	Brisbane Bullets	Melbourne Sports and Entertainment Centre	N/A	boxscore
4/05/1991	Gold Coast Rollers	108–127	Sydney Kings	Carrara Indoor Stadium	N/A	boxscore

=== Round 6 ===
Date	Home	Score	Away	Venue	Crowd	Boxscore
10/05/1991	Sydney Kings	110–99	Adelaide 36ers	Sydney Entertainment Centre	N/A	boxscore
10/05/1991	Newcastle Falcons	93–126	Eastside Spectres	Newcastle Sports Entertainment Centre	N/A	boxscore
10/05/1991	Melbourne Tigers	118–134	North Melbourne Giants	Melbourne Sports and Entertainment Centre	N/A	boxscore
10/05/1991	Geelong Supercats	124–120	Canberra Cannons	Geelong Arena	N/A	boxscore
11/05/1991	Brisbane Bullets	99–100	Perth Wildcats	Brisbane Entertainment Centre	N/A	boxscore
11/05/1991	Illawarra Hawks	123–108	Eastside Spectres	Beaton Park Stadium	N/A	boxscore
11/05/1991	Hobart Tassie Devils	130–157	North Melbourne Giants	Derwent Entertainment Centre	N/A	boxscore
11/05/1991	Southern Melbourne Saints	100–93	Canberra Cannons	Melbourne Sports and Entertainment Centre	N/A	boxscore
11/05/1991	Gold Coast Rollers	114–105	Adelaide 36ers	Carrara Indoor Stadium	N/A	boxscore

=== Round 7 ===
Date	Home	Score	Away	Venue	Crowd	Boxscore
17/05/1991	Perth Wildcats	103–105	Geelong Supercats	Perth Entertainment Centre	N/A	boxscore
17/05/1991	Hobart Tassie Devils	90–103	Gold Coast Rollers	Derwent Entertainment Centre	N/A	boxscore
17/05/1991	North Melbourne Giants	117–104	Sydney Kings	Melbourne Sports and Entertainment Centre	N/A	boxscore
18/05/1991	Adelaide 36ers	121–116	Geelong Supercats	Apollo Entertainment Centre	N/A	boxscore
18/05/1991	Brisbane Bullets	121–118	Southern Melbourne Saints	Brisbane Entertainment Centre	N/A	boxscore
18/05/1991	Illawarra Hawks	139–105	Newcastle Falcons	Beaton Park Stadium	N/A	boxscore
18/05/1991	Eastside Spectres	117–127	Sydney Kings	Melbourne Sports and Entertainment Centre	N/A	boxscore
19/05/1991	Melbourne Tigers	120–115	Gold Coast Rollers	Melbourne Sports and Entertainment Centre	N/A	boxscore

=== Round 8 ===
Date	Home	Score	Away	Venue	Crowd	Boxscore
24/05/1991	Perth Wildcats	98–80	Eastside Spectres	Perth Entertainment Centre	N/A	boxscore
24/05/1991	Hobart Tassie Devils	118–111	Melbourne Tigers	Derwent Entertainment Centre	N/A	boxscore
24/05/1991	Gold Coast Rollers	108–95	Geelong Supercats	Carrara Indoor Stadium	N/A	boxscore
25/05/1991	Brisbane Bullets	125–123	Illawarra Hawks	Brisbane Entertainment Centre	N/A	boxscore
25/05/1991	Canberra Cannons	88–114	North Melbourne Giants	AIS Arena	N/A	boxscore
25/05/1991	Newcastle Falcons	106–108	Southern Melbourne Saints	Newcastle Sports Entertainment Centre	N/A	boxscore
25/05/1991	Adelaide 36ers	115–116	Eastside Spectres	Apollo Entertainment Centre	N/A	boxscore
25/05/1991	Sydney Kings	103–91	Geelong Supercats	Sydney Entertainment Centre	N/A	boxscore

=== Round 9 ===
Date	Home	Score	Away	Venue	Crowd	Boxscore
31/05/1991	Perth Wildcats	115–104	Melbourne Tigers	Perth Entertainment Centre	N/A	boxscore
31/05/1991	Sydney Kings	111–109	Brisbane Bullets	Sydney Entertainment Centre	N/A	boxscore
31/05/1991	North Melbourne Giants	119–98	Illawarra Hawks	Melbourne Sports and Entertainment Centre	N/A	boxscore
31/05/1991	Geelong Supercats	157–128	Hobart Tassie Devils	Geelong Arena	N/A	boxscore
1/06/1991	Adelaide 36ers	121–108	Melbourne Tigers	Apollo Entertainment Centre	N/A	boxscore
1/06/1991	Gold Coast Rollers	110–104	Brisbane Bullets	Carrara Indoor Stadium	N/A	boxscore
1/06/1991	Eastside Spectres	116–106	Illawarra Hawks	Melbourne Sports and Entertainment Centre	N/A	boxscore
1/06/1991	Canberra Cannons	109–90	Newcastle Falcons	AIS Arena	N/A	boxscore
2/06/1991	Southern Melbourne Saints	108–112	Hobart Tassie Devils	Melbourne Sports and Entertainment Centre	N/A	boxscore

=== Round 10 ===
Date	Home	Score	Away	Venue	Crowd	Boxscore
7/06/1991	Gold Coast Rollers	99–97	Newcastle Falcons	Carrara Indoor Stadium	N/A	boxscore
7/06/1991	Melbourne Tigers	126–113	Illawarra Hawks	Melbourne Sports and Entertainment Centre	N/A	boxscore
7/06/1991	Canberra Cannons	116–90	Perth Wildcats	AIS Arena	N/A	boxscore
7/06/1991	Geelong Supercats	136–118	Southern Melbourne Saints	Geelong Arena	N/A	boxscore
8/06/1991	Sydney Kings	120–107	Newcastle Falcons	Sydney Entertainment Centre	N/A	boxscore
8/06/1991	Hobart Tassie Devils	106–107	Illawarra Hawks	Derwent Entertainment Centre	N/A	boxscore
8/06/1991	Eastside Spectres	104–99	Adelaide 36ers	Melbourne Sports and Entertainment Centre	N/A	boxscore
9/06/1991	North Melbourne Giants	94–107	Perth Wildcats	Melbourne Sports and Entertainment Centre	N/A	boxscore

=== Round 11 ===
Date	Home	Score	Away	Venue	Crowd	Boxscore
14/06/1991	North Melbourne Giants	106–107	Adelaide 36ers	Melbourne Sports and Entertainment Centre	N/A	boxscore
15/06/1991	Newcastle Falcons	118–130	Geelong Supercats	Newcastle Sports Entertainment Centre	N/A	boxscore
15/06/1991	Illawarra Hawks	99–102	Brisbane Bullets	Beaton Park Stadium	N/A	boxscore
15/06/1991	Eastside Spectres	121–106	Canberra Cannons	Melbourne Sports and Entertainment Centre	N/A	boxscore
16/06/1991	Southern Melbourne Saints	116–123	Melbourne Tigers	Melbourne Sports and Entertainment Centre	N/A	boxscore

=== Round 12 ===
Date	Home	Score	Away	Venue	Crowd	Boxscore
21/06/1991	Sydney Kings	107–116	Perth Wildcats	Sydney Entertainment Centre	N/A	boxscore
21/06/1991	Melbourne Tigers	114–108	Adelaide 36ers	Melbourne Sports and Entertainment Centre	N/A	boxscore
22/06/1991	Canberra Cannons	136–85	Southern Melbourne Saints	AIS Arena	N/A	boxscore
22/06/1991	Hobart Tassie Devils	114–112	Adelaide 36ers	Derwent Entertainment Centre	N/A	boxscore
22/06/1991	Eastside Spectres	104–114	North Melbourne Giants	Melbourne Sports and Entertainment Centre	N/A	boxscore
22/06/1991	Gold Coast Rollers	89–95	Perth Wildcats	Carrara Indoor Stadium	N/A	boxscore

=== Round 13 ===
Date	Home	Score	Away	Venue	Crowd	Boxscore
28/06/1991	Southern Melbourne Saints	103–106	Eastside Spectres	Melbourne Sports and Entertainment Centre	N/A	boxscore
28/06/1991	Geelong Supercats	119–112	Brisbane Bullets	Geelong Arena	N/A	boxscore
29/06/1991	Perth Wildcats	93–90	Adelaide 36ers	Perth Entertainment Centre	N/A	boxscore
29/06/1991	Newcastle Falcons	103–111	Sydney Kings	Newcastle Sports Entertainment Centre	N/A	boxscore
29/06/1991	Illawarra Hawks	145–119	Hobart Tassie Devils	Beaton Park Stadium	N/A	boxscore
29/06/1991	Melbourne Tigers	122–120	Canberra Cannons	Melbourne Sports and Entertainment Centre	N/A	boxscore
29/06/1991	Gold Coast Rollers	105–93	North Melbourne Giants	Carrara Indoor Stadium	N/A	boxscore

=== Round 14 ===
Date	Home	Score	Away	Venue	Crowd	Boxscore
5/07/1991	Adelaide 36ers	121–85	Canberra Cannons	Apollo Entertainment Centre	N/A	boxscore
5/07/1991	Gold Coast Rollers	90–83	Southern Melbourne Saints	Carrara Indoor Stadium	N/A	boxscore
5/07/1991	Newcastle Falcons	107–118	North Melbourne Giants	Newcastle Sports Entertainment Centre	N/A	boxscore
5/07/1991	Geelong Supercats	116–108	Eastside Spectres	Geelong Arena	N/A	boxscore
6/07/1991	Perth Wildcats	92–79	Canberra Cannons	Perth Entertainment Centre	N/A	boxscore
6/07/1991	Brisbane Bullets	128–117	Melbourne Tigers	Brisbane Entertainment Centre	N/A	boxscore
6/07/1991	Sydney Kings	106–91	Southern Melbourne Saints	Sydney Entertainment Centre	N/A	boxscore
6/07/1991	Illawarra Hawks	107–119	North Melbourne Giants	Beaton Park Stadium	N/A	boxscore
6/07/1991	Hobart Tassie Devils	107–150	Eastside Spectres	Derwent Entertainment Centre	N/A	boxscore

=== Round 15 ===
Date	Home	Score	Away	Venue	Crowd	Boxscore
19/07/1991	Hobart Tassie Devils	111–107	Geelong Supercats	Derwent Entertainment Centre	N/A	boxscore
19/07/1991	North Melbourne Giants	120–112	Canberra Cannons	Melbourne Sports and Entertainment Centre	N/A	boxscore
20/07/1991	Perth Wildcats	99–94	Sydney Kings	Perth Entertainment Centre	N/A	boxscore
20/07/1991	Brisbane Bullets	107–109	Gold Coast Rollers	Brisbane Entertainment Centre	N/A	boxscore
20/07/1991	Illawarra Hawks	127–131	Southern Melbourne Saints	Beaton Park Stadium	N/A	boxscore
20/07/1991	Eastside Spectres	142–111	Newcastle Falcons	Melbourne Sports and Entertainment Centre	N/A	boxscore
21/07/1991	Melbourne Tigers	111–133	Geelong Supercats	Melbourne Sports and Entertainment Centre	N/A	boxscore

=== Round 16 ===
Date	Home	Score	Away	Venue	Crowd	Boxscore
25/07/1991	Southern Melbourne Saints	100–110	Gold Coast Rollers	Melbourne Sports and Entertainment Centre	N/A	boxscore
26/07/1991	Hobart Tassie Devils	94–115	Perth Wildcats	Derwent Entertainment Centre	N/A	boxscore
26/07/1991	North Melbourne Giants	114–101	Newcastle Falcons	Melbourne Sports and Entertainment Centre	N/A	boxscore
26/07/1991	Geelong Supercats	109–102	Gold Coast Rollers	Geelong Arena	N/A	boxscore
27/07/1991	Adelaide 36ers	133–111	Sydney Kings	Apollo Entertainment Centre	N/A	boxscore
27/07/1991	Brisbane Bullets	90–94	Canberra Cannons	Brisbane Entertainment Centre	N/A	boxscore
27/07/1991	Illawarra Hawks	158–186	Melbourne Tigers	Beaton Park Stadium	N/A	boxscore
27/07/1991	Eastside Spectres	103–100	Perth Wildcats	Melbourne Sports and Entertainment Centre	N/A	boxscore

=== Round 17 ===
Date	Home	Score	Away	Venue	Crowd	Boxscore
2/08/1991	Perth Wildcats	109–101	North Melbourne Giants	Perth Entertainment Centre	N/A	boxscore
2/08/1991	Hobart Tassie Devils	101–118	Brisbane Bullets	Derwent Entertainment Centre	N/A	boxscore
2/08/1991	Southern Melbourne Saints	107–106	Sydney Kings	Melbourne Sports and Entertainment Centre	N/A	boxscore
3/08/1991	Adelaide 36ers	118–109	North Melbourne Giants	Apollo Entertainment Centre	N/A	boxscore
3/08/1991	Canberra Cannons	107–84	Eastside Spectres	AIS Arena	N/A	boxscore
3/08/1991	Newcastle Falcons	96–112	Gold Coast Rollers	Newcastle Sports Entertainment Centre	N/A	boxscore
3/08/1991	Melbourne Tigers	128–101	Brisbane Bullets	Melbourne Sports and Entertainment Centre	N/A	boxscore
3/08/1991	Geelong Supercats	126–117	Sydney Kings	Geelong Arena	N/A	boxscore

=== Round 18 ===
Date	Home	Score	Away	Venue	Crowd	Boxscore
9/08/1991	Gold Coast Rollers	96–108	Eastside Spectres	Carrara Indoor Stadium	N/A	boxscore
10/08/1991	Sydney Kings	92–87	Eastside Spectres	Sydney Entertainment Centre	N/A	boxscore
10/08/1991	Canberra Cannons	85–120	Adelaide 36ers	AIS Arena	N/A	boxscore
10/08/1991	Newcastle Falcons	117–116	Illawarra Hawks	Newcastle Sports Entertainment Centre	N/A	boxscore
10/08/1991	Brisbane Bullets	116–107	Hobart Tassie Devils	Brisbane Entertainment Centre	N/A	boxscore
11/08/1991	Geelong Supercats	121–113	North Melbourne Giants	Geelong Arena	N/A	boxscore

=== Round 19 ===
Date	Home	Score	Away	Venue	Crowd	Boxscore
16/08/1991	Southern Melbourne Saints	125–151	North Melbourne Giants	Melbourne Sports and Entertainment Centre	N/A	boxscore
16/08/1991	Newcastle Falcons	107–123	Adelaide 36ers	Newcastle Sports Entertainment Centre	N/A	boxscore
17/08/1991	Hobart Tassie Devils	118–106	Canberra Cannons	Derwent Entertainment Centre	N/A	boxscore
17/08/1991	Brisbane Bullets	83–99	Eastside Spectres	Brisbane Entertainment Centre	N/A	boxscore
17/08/1991	Sydney Kings	102–113	Gold Coast Rollers	Sydney Entertainment Centre	N/A	boxscore
17/08/1991	Illawarra Hawks	131–135	Adelaide 36ers	Beaton Park Stadium	N/A	boxscore
17/08/1991	Melbourne Tigers	103–104	Perth Wildcats	Melbourne Sports and Entertainment Centre	N/A	boxscore

=== Round 20 ===
Date	Home	Score	Away	Venue	Crowd	Boxscore
23/08/1991	Gold Coast Rollers	114–111	Canberra Cannons	Carrara Indoor Stadium	N/A	boxscore
23/08/1991	Illawarra Hawks	115–116	Perth Wildcats	Beaton Park Stadium	N/A	boxscore
23/08/1991	North Melbourne Giants	109–111	Melbourne Tigers	Melbourne Sports and Entertainment Centre	N/A	boxscore
23/08/1991	Geelong Supercats	110–101	Adelaide 36ers	Geelong Arena	N/A	boxscore
24/08/1991	Sydney Kings	96–85	Canberra Cannons	Sydney Entertainment Centre	N/A	boxscore
24/08/1991	Southern Melbourne Saints	114–128	Adelaide 36ers	Melbourne Sports and Entertainment Centre	N/A	boxscore
24/08/1991	Newcastle Falcons	99–108	Perth Wildcats	Newcastle Sports Entertainment Centre	N/A	boxscore

=== Round 21 ===
Date	Home	Score	Away	Venue	Crowd	Boxscore
30/08/1991	Perth Wildcats	108–78	Southern Melbourne Saints	Perth Entertainment Centre	N/A	boxscore
30/08/1991	Illawarra Hawks	132–117	Geelong Supercats	Beaton Park Stadium	N/A	boxscore
30/08/1991	Hobart Tassie Devils	133–117	Newcastle Falcons	Derwent Entertainment Centre	N/A	boxscore
30/08/1991	North Melbourne Giants	136–107	Gold Coast Rollers	Melbourne Sports and Entertainment Centre	N/A	boxscore
31/08/1991	Adelaide 36ers	120–119	Southern Melbourne Saints	Apollo Entertainment Centre	N/A	boxscore
31/08/1991	Brisbane Bullets	106–101	Sydney Kings	Brisbane Entertainment Centre	N/A	boxscore
31/08/1991	Canberra Cannons	113–117	Geelong Supercats	AIS Arena	N/A	boxscore
31/08/1991	Eastside Spectres	106–102	Gold Coast Rollers	Melbourne Sports and Entertainment Centre	N/A	boxscore
1/09/1991	Melbourne Tigers	130–114	Newcastle Falcons	Melbourne Sports and Entertainment Centre	N/A	boxscore

=== Round 22 ===
Date	Home	Score	Away	Venue	Crowd	Boxscore
6/09/1991	Perth Wildcats	117–86	Gold Coast Rollers	Perth Entertainment Centre	N/A	boxscore
6/09/1991	Canberra Cannons	105–114	Sydney Kings	AIS Arena	N/A	boxscore
6/09/1991	Hobart Tassie Devils	113–131	Southern Melbourne Saints	Derwent Entertainment Centre	N/A	boxscore
6/09/1991	Geelong Supercats	126–129	Newcastle Falcons	Geelong Arena	N/A	boxscore
7/09/1991	Adelaide 36ers	123–111	Gold Coast Rollers	Apollo Entertainment Centre	N/A	boxscore
7/09/1991	Brisbane Bullets	110–109	Newcastle Falcons	Brisbane Entertainment Centre	N/A	boxscore
7/09/1991	Illawarra Hawks	106–125	Sydney Kings	Beaton Park Stadium	N/A	boxscore
7/09/1991	Melbourne Tigers	131–119	Southern Melbourne Saints	Melbourne Sports and Entertainment Centre	N/A	boxscore
8/09/1991	North Melbourne Giants	116–121	Eastside Spectres	Melbourne Sports and Entertainment Centre	N/A	boxscore

=== Round 23 ===
Date	Home	Score	Away	Venue	Crowd	Boxscore
13/09/1991	Adelaide 36ers	133–116	Brisbane Bullets	Apollo Entertainment Centre	N/A	boxscore
13/09/1991	Sydney Kings	124–102	Hobart Tassie Devils	Sydney Entertainment Centre	N/A	boxscore
13/09/1991	Southern Melbourne Saints	139–151	Geelong Supercats	Melbourne Sports and Entertainment Centre	N/A	boxscore
14/09/1991	Perth Wildcats	110–98	Brisbane Bullets	Perth Entertainment Centre	N/A	boxscore
14/09/1991	Eastside Spectres	112–107	Melbourne Tigers	Melbourne Sports and Entertainment Centre	N/A	boxscore
14/09/1991	Canberra Cannons	114–97	Illawarra Hawks	AIS Arena	N/A	boxscore
14/09/1991	Gold Coast Rollers	102–103	Hobart Tassie Devils	Carrara Indoor Stadium	N/A	boxscore

=== Round 24 ===
Date	Home	Score	Away	Venue	Crowd	Boxscore
20/09/1991	Gold Coast Rollers	133–137	Illawarra Hawks	Carrara Indoor Stadium	N/A	boxscore
20/09/1991	Newcastle Falcons	120–110	Brisbane Bullets	Newcastle Sports Entertainment Centre	N/A	boxscore
20/09/1991	North Melbourne Giants	117–98	Hobart Tassie Devils	Melbourne Sports and Entertainment Centre	N/A	boxscore
21/09/1991	Adelaide 36ers	98–99	Perth Wildcats	Apollo Entertainment Centre	N/A	boxscore
21/09/1991	Sydney Kings	132–114	Illawarra Hawks	Sydney Entertainment Centre	N/A	boxscore
21/09/1991	Canberra Cannons	118–131	Brisbane Bullets	AIS Arena	N/A	boxscore
21/09/1991	Eastside Spectres	119–102	Hobart Tassie Devils	Melbourne Sports and Entertainment Centre	N/A	boxscore
22/09/1991	Geelong Supercats	142–122	Melbourne Tigers	Geelong Arena	N/A	boxscore

== Ladder ==
Pos	1991 NBL season											
Pos	Team	Pld	W	L	PCT	Last 5	Streak	Home	Away	PF	PA	PP
1	Perth Wildcats	26	22	4	84.62%	5–0	W8	12–1	10–3	2750	2508	109.65%
2	Eastside Spectres^{1}	26	17	9	65.38%	5–0	W5	10–3	7–6	2932	2792	105.01%
3	Geelong Supercats^{1}	26	17	9	65.38%	3–2	W2	11–2	6–7	3143	2980	105.47%
4	Adelaide 36ers^{2}	26	16	10	61.54%	4–1	L1	11–2	5–8	3028	2876	105.29%
5	Melbourne Tigers^{2}	26	16	10	61.54%	3–2	L2	10–3	6–7	3104	3044	101.97%
6	North Melbourne Giants^{2}	26	16	10	61.54%	3–2	W1	8–5	8–5	3047	2840	107.29%
7	Sydney Kings^{3}	26	14	12	53.85%	4–1	W4	9–4	5–8	2821	2775	101.66%
8	Gold Coast Rollers^{3}	26	14	12	53.85%	0–5	L6	8–5	6–7	2781	2805	99.14%
9	Brisbane Bullets	26	13	13	50.00%	2–3	W1	8–5	5–8	2912	2968	98.11%
10	Canberra Cannons^{4}	26	9	17	34.62%	1–4	L1	7–6	2–11	2741	2781	98.56%
11	Southern Melbourne Saints^{4}	26	9	17	34.62%	1–4	L2	6–7	3–10	2872	3094	92.82%
12	Hobart Tassie Devils	26	8	18	30.77%	1–4	L2	6–7	2–11	2811	3047	92.25%
13	Illawarra Hawks	26	6	20	23.08%	2–3	L1	4–9	2–11	3032	3196	94.87%
14	Newcastle Falcons	26	5	21	19.23%	2–3	W1	4–9	1–12	2803	3071	91.27%

Updated to match(es) played on 22 September 1991. Source: NBL.com.au

The NBL tie-breaker system as outlined in the NBL Rules and Regulations states that in the case of an identical win–loss record, the results in games played between the teams will determine order of seeding.

^{1}Head-to-Head between Eastside Spectres and Geelong Supercats (1-1). Eastside Spectres won For and Against(+1).

^{2}3-way Head-to-Head between Adelaide 36ers (3-1), Melbourne Tigers (2-2) and North Melbourne Giants (1-3).

^{3}Head-to-Head between Sydney Kings and Gold Coast Rollers (1-1). Sydney Kings won For and Against (+8).

^{4}Head-to-Head between Canberra Cannons and Southern Melbourne Saints (1-1). Canberra Cannons won For and Against (+44).

== Finals ==
=== Playoff bracket ===
Elimination Finals
4	Adelaide 36ers	129	132	X
5	Melbourne Tigers	115	96	X
3	Geelong Supercats	139	116	113
6	North Melbourne Giants	119	136	125

Semifinals
1	Perth Wildcats	102	105	X
4	Adelaide 36ers	99	104	X
2	Eastside Spectres	99	115	X
6	North Melbourne Giants	93	104	X

Grand Final
1	Perth Wildcats	109	81	90
2	Eastside Spectres	83	86	80

There were two best of three Elimination finals, two best of three semifinals, and then best of three grand final series. All three of these finals were sudden death.

=== Elimination Finals ===
Date	Home	Score	Away	Venue	Crowd	Boxscore
25/09/1991	Geelong Supercats	139–119	North Melbourne Giants	{{{venue}}}	{{{crowd}}}	boxscore
25/09/1991	Melbourne Tigers	115–129	Adelaide 36ers	{{{venue}}}	{{{crowd}}}	boxscore
27/09/1991	North Melbourne Giants	136–116	Geelong Supercats	{{{venue}}}	{{{crowd}}}	boxscore
27/09/1991	Adelaide 36ers	132–96	Melbourne Tigers	{{{venue}}}	{{{crowd}}}	boxscore
29/09/1991	Geelong Supercats	113–125	North Melbourne Giants	{{{venue}}}	{{{crowd}}}	boxscore

=== Semifinals ===
Date	Home	Score	Away	Venue	Crowd	Boxscore
4/10/1991	North Melbourne Giants	93–99	Eastside Spectres	{{{venue}}}	{{{crowd}}}	boxscore
5/10/1991	Adelaide 36ers	99–102	Perth Wildcats	{{{venue}}}	{{{crowd}}}	boxscore
10/10/1991	Perth Wildcats	105–104	Adelaide 36ers	{{{venue}}}	{{{crowd}}}	boxscore
11/10/1991	Eastside Spectres	115–104	North Melbourne Giants	{{{venue}}}	{{{crowd}}}	boxscore

=== Grand Final ===
Date	Home	Score	Away	Venue	Crowd	Boxscore
19/10/1991	Eastside Spectres	83–109	Perth Wildcats	{{{venue}}}	{{{crowd}}}	boxscore
25/10/1991	Perth Wildcats	81–86	Eastside Spectres	{{{venue}}}	{{{crowd}}}	boxscore
27/10/1991	Perth Wildcats	90–80	Eastside Spectres	{{{venue}}}	{{{crowd}}}	boxscore

== 1991 NBL statistics leaders ==
Category	Player	Team	Stat
Points per game	Andrew Gaze	Melbourne Tigers	38.7
Rebounds per game	James Bullock	Newcastle Falcons	16.0
Assists per game	Butch Hays	Adelaide 36ers	9.0
Steals per game	Bobby Locke	Geelong Supercats	3.0
Blocks per game	John Dorge	Geelong Supercats	4.3
Free throw percentage	Leroy Loggins	Brisbane Bullets	91.1%

== NBL awards ==
- Most Valuable Player: Andrew Gaze, Melbourne Tigers
- Most Valuable Player Grand Final: Peter Hansen, Perth Wildcats
- Best Defensive Player: Terry Dozier, Geelong Supercats
- Most Improved Player: Andrew Parkinson, Southern Melbourne Saints
- Rookie of the Year: Andrew Vlahov, Perth Wildcats
- Coach of the Year: Murray Arnold, Perth Wildcats

== All NBL Team ==
#	Player	Team
PG	Ricky Grace	Perth Wildcats
SG	Andrew Gaze	Melbourne Tigers
SF	Scott Fisher	North Melbourne Giants
PF	Mark Davis	Adelaide 36ers
C	Mike Mitchell	Gold Coast Rollers
