= 1990 NBL season =

- League: National Basketball League
- Sport: Basketball
- Duration: 30 March – 22 September 1990; 26 September – 14 October 1990 (Finals); 19 – 28 October 1990 (Grand Finals)
- Teams: 14
- TV partner: Seven Network

Regular season
- Season champions: North Melbourne Giants
- Season MVP: Derek Rucker (Brisbane)
- Top scorer: Derek Rucker (Brisbane)

Finals
- Champions: Perth Wildcats (1st title)
- Runners-up: Brisbane Bullets
- Finals MVP: Ricky Grace (Perth)

NBL seasons
- ← 1989 1991 →

The 1990 NBL season was the 12th season of competition since its establishment in 1979. With the addition of the Gold Coast Cougars a total of 14 teams contested the league.

== Clubs ==
Club	Location	Home Venue	Capacity	Founded	Head coach
Adelaide 36ers	Adelaide, South Australia	Apollo Stadium	3,000	1982	(Australia) Don Shipway
Brisbane Bullets	Brisbane, Queensland	Brisbane Entertainment Centre	13,500	1979	(Australia) Brian Kerle
Canberra Cannons	Canberra, Australian Capital Territory	AIS Arena	5,200	1979	(Australia) Steve Breheny
Eastside Spectres	(Victoria (state)) Melbourne, Victoria	Burwood Stadium	2,000	1979	(United States) Brian Goorjian
Geelong Supercats	(Victoria (state)) Geelong, Victoria	Geelong Arena	2,000	1982	(Australia) Barry Barnes
Gold Coast Cougars	Gold Coast, Queensland	Carrara Indoor Stadium	2,992	1990	(Australia) Dave Claxton
Hobart Tassie Devils	Hobart, Tasmania	Derwent Entertainment Centre	5,400	1983	(Australia) Tom Maher
Illawarra Hawks	Wollongong, New South Wales	Illawarra Basketball Stadium	2,000	1979	(Australia) Dave Lindstrom
Melbourne Tigers	(Victoria (state)) Melbourne, Victoria	The Glass House	7,200	1931	(Australia) Lindsay Gaze
Newcastle Falcons	Newcastle, New South Wales	Broadmeadow Basketball Stadium	2,200	1979	(Australia) Ken Cole
North Melbourne Giants	(Victoria (state)) Melbourne, Victoria	The Glass House	7,200	1980	(United States) Bruce Palmer
Perth Wildcats	Perth, Western Australia	Perth Entertainment Centre	8,200	1982	(Australia) Alan Black (United States) Cal Bruton
Sydney Kings	Sydney, New South Wales	Sydney Entertainment Centre	10,500	1988	(United States) Bob Turner
Westside Saints	(Victoria (state)) Melbourne, Victoria	Keilor Stadium	2,000	1979	(Australia) Dean Templeton

== Regular season ==
The 1990 regular season took place over 23 rounds between 30 March 1990 and 22 September 1990.

=== Round 1 ===
Date	Home	Score	Away	Venue	Crowd	Box Score
30/03/1990	Gold Coast Cougars	112–132	Melbourne Tigers	Carrara Indoor Stadium	N/A	boxscore
30/03/1990	North Melbourne Giants	124–100	Hobart Tassie Devils	Melbourne Sports and Entertainment Centre	N/A	boxscore
30/03/1990	Geelong Supercats	96–100	Perth Wildcats	Geelong Arena	N/A	boxscore
30/03/1990	Brisbane Bullets	122–119	Adelaide 36ers	Brisbane Entertainment Centre	N/A	boxscore
31/03/1990	Sydney Kings	91–114	Melbourne Tigers	Sydney Entertainment Centre	N/A	boxscore
31/03/1990	Newcastle Falcons	99–116	Eastside Spectres	Newcastle Sports Entertainment Centre	N/A	boxscore
31/03/1990	Westside Saints	140–121	Perth Wildcats	Melbourne Sports and Entertainment Centre	N/A	boxscore
31/03/1990	Illawarra Hawks	124–108	Hobart Tassie Devils	Beaton Park Stadium	N/A	boxscore

=== Round 2 ===
Date	Home	Score	Away	Venue	Crowd	Box Score
6/04/1990	Perth Wildcats	125–118	Illawarra Hawks	Perth Entertainment Centre	N/A	boxscore
6/04/1990	Sydney Kings	101–106	North Melbourne Giants	Sydney Entertainment Centre	N/A	boxscore
6/04/1990	Newcastle Falcons	119–118	Canberra Cannons	Newcastle Sports Entertainment Centre	N/A	boxscore
6/04/1990	Melbourne Tigers	150–119	Westside Saints	Melbourne Sports and Entertainment Centre	N/A	boxscore
7/04/1990	Adelaide 36ers	111–112	Illawarra Hawks	Apollo Entertainment Centre	N/A	boxscore
7/04/1990	Brisbane Bullets	115–96	Geelong Supercats	Brisbane Entertainment Centre	N/A	boxscore
7/04/1990	Gold Coast Cougars	104–107	North Melbourne Giants	Carrara Indoor Stadium	N/A	boxscore
7/04/1990	Eastside Spectres	100–90	Canberra Cannons	Melbourne Sports and Entertainment Centre	N/A	boxscore
7/04/1990	Hobart Tassie Devils	116–113	Westside Saints	Derwent Entertainment Centre	N/A	boxscore

=== Round 3 ===
Date	Home	Score	Away	Venue	Crowd	Box Score
12/04/1990	Westside Saints	111–123	Brisbane Bullets	Melbourne Sports and Entertainment Centre	N/A	boxscore
14/04/1990	Canberra Cannons	120–105	Hobart Tassie Devils	AIS Arena	N/A	boxscore
14/04/1990	Geelong Supercats	84–91	Sydney Kings	Geelong Arena	N/A	boxscore
14/04/1990	Gold Coast Cougars	112–121	Perth Wildcats	Carrara Indoor Stadium	N/A	boxscore
14/04/1990	Melbourne Tigers	126–107	Illawarra Hawks	Melbourne Sports and Entertainment Centre	N/A	boxscore

=== Round 4 ===
Date	Home	Score	Away	Venue	Crowd	Box Score
20/04/1990	Adelaide 36ers	132–99	Newcastle Falcons	Apollo Entertainment Centre	N/A	boxscore
20/04/1990	Illawarra Hawks	128–118	Gold Coast Cougars	Beaton Park Stadium	N/A	boxscore
20/04/1990	North Melbourne Giants	148–119	Sydney Kings	Melbourne Sports and Entertainment Centre	N/A	boxscore
20/04/1990	Geelong Supercats	97–101	Brisbane Bullets	Geelong Arena	N/A	boxscore
21/04/1990	Hobart Tassie Devils	107–102	Melbourne Tigers	Derwent Entertainment Centre	N/A	boxscore
21/04/1990	Perth Wildcats	116–94	Newcastle Falcons	Perth Entertainment Centre	N/A	boxscore
21/04/1990	Eastside Spectres	117–98	Gold Coast Cougars	Melbourne Sports and Entertainment Centre	N/A	boxscore
21/04/1990	Canberra Cannons	100–126	Sydney Kings	AIS Arena	N/A	boxscore

=== Round 5 ===
Date	Home	Score	Away	Venue	Crowd	Box Score
26/04/1990	Westside Saints	115–137	Illawarra Hawks	Melbourne Sports and Entertainment Centre	N/A	boxscore
27/04/1990	Perth Wildcats	111–116	Canberra Cannons	Perth Entertainment Centre	N/A	boxscore
27/04/1990	Sydney Kings	99–101	Gold Coast Cougars	Sydney Entertainment Centre	N/A	boxscore
27/04/1990	Newcastle Falcons	100–121	North Melbourne Giants	Newcastle Sports Entertainment Centre	N/A	boxscore
27/04/1990	Melbourne Tigers	116–113	Brisbane Bullets	Melbourne Sports and Entertainment Centre	N/A	boxscore
27/04/1990	Geelong Supercats	123–128	Illawarra Hawks	Geelong Arena	N/A	boxscore
28/04/1990	Adelaide 36ers	119–101	Canberra Cannons	Apollo Entertainment Centre	N/A	boxscore
28/04/1990	Eastside Spectres	89–98	North Melbourne Giants	Melbourne Sports and Entertainment Centre	N/A	boxscore
28/04/1990	Hobart Tassie Devils	109–117	Brisbane Bullets	Derwent Entertainment Centre	N/A	boxscore

=== Round 6 ===
Date	Home	Score	Away	Venue	Crowd	Box Score
4/05/1990	Gold Coast Cougars	138–139	Adelaide 36ers	Carrara Indoor Stadium	N/A	boxscore
4/05/1990	Canberra Cannons	114–107	Melbourne Tigers	AIS Arena	N/A	boxscore
5/05/1990	Sydney Kings	117–93	Adelaide 36ers	Sydney Entertainment Centre	N/A	boxscore
5/05/1990	Newcastle Falcons	109–110	Hobart Tassie Devils	Newcastle Sports Entertainment Centre	N/A	boxscore
5/05/1990	Illawarra Hawks	136–142	North Melbourne Giants	Beaton Park Stadium	N/A	boxscore
5/05/1990	Geelong Supercats	105–117	Eastside Spectres	Geelong Arena	N/A	boxscore

=== Round 7 ===
Date	Home	Score	Away	Venue	Crowd	Box Score
10/05/1990	Westside Saints	107–93	Newcastle Falcons	Melbourne Sports and Entertainment Centre	N/A	boxscore
11/05/1990	North Melbourne Giants	126–116	Adelaide 36ers	Melbourne Sports and Entertainment Centre	N/A	boxscore
11/05/1990	Hobart Tassie Devils	91–102	Perth Wildcats	Derwent Entertainment Centre	N/A	boxscore
12/05/1990	Sydney Kings	109–79	Newcastle Falcons	Sydney Entertainment Centre	N/A	boxscore
12/05/1990	Brisbane Bullets	121–100	Gold Coast Cougars	Brisbane Entertainment Centre	N/A	boxscore
12/05/1990	Eastside Spectres	115–110	Adelaide 36ers	Melbourne Sports and Entertainment Centre	N/A	boxscore
12/05/1990	Canberra Cannons	114–90	Geelong Supercats	AIS Arena	N/A	boxscore
13/05/1990	Melbourne Tigers	133–107	Perth Wildcats	Melbourne Sports and Entertainment Centre	N/A	boxscore

=== Round 8 ===
Date	Home	Score	Away	Venue	Crowd	Box Score
18/05/1990	Adelaide 36ers	107–131	Geelong Supercats	Apollo Entertainment Centre	N/A	boxscore
18/05/1990	Brisbane Bullets	129–112	Westside Saints	Brisbane Entertainment Centre	N/A	boxscore
18/05/1990	Hobart Tassie Devils	107–143	Sydney Kings	Derwent Entertainment Centre	N/A	boxscore
18/05/1990	Illawarra Hawks	122–117	Eastside Spectres	Beaton Park Stadium	N/A	boxscore
19/05/1990	Perth Wildcats	119–102	Geelong Supercats	Perth Entertainment Centre	N/A	boxscore
19/05/1990	Newcastle Falcons	124–142	Melbourne Tigers	Newcastle Sports Entertainment Centre	N/A	boxscore
19/05/1990	Canberra Cannons	95–89	Gold Coast Cougars	AIS Arena	N/A	boxscore

=== Round 9 ===
Date	Home	Score	Away	Venue	Crowd	Box Score
24/05/1990	Westside Saints	103–116	Canberra Cannons	Melbourne Sports and Entertainment Centre	N/A	boxscore
25/05/1990	Sydney Kings	92–95	Brisbane Bullets	Sydney Entertainment Centre	N/A	boxscore
25/05/1990	Adelaide 36ers	120–106	North Melbourne Giants	Apollo Entertainment Centre	N/A	boxscore
25/05/1990	Geelong Supercats	129–116	Canberra Cannons	Geelong Arena	N/A	boxscore
25/05/1990	Melbourne Tigers	110–111	Eastside Spectres	Melbourne Sports and Entertainment Centre	N/A	boxscore
26/05/1990	Perth Wildcats	94–108	North Melbourne Giants	Perth Entertainment Centre	N/A	boxscore
26/05/1990	Illawarra Hawks	125–104	Newcastle Falcons	Beaton Park Stadium	N/A	boxscore
26/05/1990	Eastside Spectres	131–116	Hobart Tassie Devils	Melbourne Sports and Entertainment Centre	N/A	boxscore
27/05/1990	Gold Coast Cougars	109–113	Brisbane Bullets	Carrara Indoor Stadium	N/A	boxscore

=== Round 10 ===
Date	Home	Score	Away	Venue	Crowd	Box Score
1/06/1990	North Melbourne Giants	117–115	Brisbane Bullets	Melbourne Sports and Entertainment Centre	N/A	boxscore
1/06/1990	Geelong Supercats	126–111	Newcastle Falcons	Geelong Arena	N/A	boxscore
2/06/1990	Westside Saints	112–114	Geelong Supercats	Melbourne Sports and Entertainment Centre	N/A	boxscore
2/06/1990	Gold Coast Cougars	105–103	Newcastle Falcons	Carrara Indoor Stadium	N/A	boxscore
2/06/1990	Illawarra Hawks	139–134	Melbourne Tigers	Beaton Park Stadium	N/A	boxscore

=== Round 11 ===
Date	Home	Score	Away	Venue	Crowd	Box Score
8/06/1990	Brisbane Bullets	112–101	Perth Wildcats	Brisbane Entertainment Centre	N/A	boxscore
8/06/1990	Gold Coast Cougars	106–95	Westside Saints	Carrara Indoor Stadium	N/A	boxscore
8/06/1990	North Melbourne Giants	148–122	Illawarra Hawks	Melbourne Sports and Entertainment Centre	N/A	boxscore
8/06/1990	Hobart Tassie Devils	118–126	Adelaide 36ers	Derwent Entertainment Centre	N/A	boxscore
9/06/1990	Sydney Kings	125–114	Westside Saints	Sydney Entertainment Centre	N/A	boxscore
9/06/1990	Newcastle Falcons	120–129	Geelong Supercats	Newcastle Sports Entertainment Centre	N/A	boxscore
9/06/1990	Eastside Spectres	104–114	Perth Wildcats	Melbourne Sports and Entertainment Centre	N/A	boxscore
9/06/1990	Canberra Cannons	118–111	Illawarra Hawks	AIS Arena	N/A	boxscore
10/06/1990	Melbourne Tigers	113–111	Adelaide 36ers	Melbourne Sports and Entertainment Centre	N/A	boxscore

=== Round 12 ===
Date	Home	Score	Away	Venue	Crowd	Box Score
14/06/1990	Westside Saints	88–115	Hobart Tassie Devils	Melbourne Sports and Entertainment Centre	N/A	boxscore
15/06/1990	Brisbane Bullets	125–117	Eastside Spectres	Brisbane Entertainment Centre	N/A	boxscore
15/06/1990	North Melbourne Giants	112–125	Melbourne Tigers	Melbourne Sports and Entertainment Centre	N/A	boxscore
15/06/1990	Geelong Supercats	118–110	Hobart Tassie Devils	Geelong Arena	N/A	boxscore
16/06/1990	Canberra Cannons	126–116	Adelaide 36ers	AIS Arena	N/A	boxscore
16/06/1990	Sydney Kings	114–98	Perth Wildcats	Sydney Entertainment Centre	N/A	boxscore
16/06/1990	Newcastle Falcons	101–104	Gold Coast Cougars	Newcastle Sports Entertainment Centre	N/A	boxscore

=== Round 13 ===
Date	Home	Score	Away	Venue	Crowd	Box Score
21/06/1990	Westside Saints	95–123	Eastside Spectres	Melbourne Sports and Entertainment Centre	N/A	boxscore
22/06/1990	Gold Coast Cougars	108–103	Sydney Kings	Carrara Indoor Stadium	N/A	boxscore
22/06/1990	Illawarra Hawks	107–127	Brisbane Bullets	Beaton Park Stadium	N/A	boxscore
22/06/1990	Melbourne Tigers	144–126	Hobart Tassie Devils	Melbourne Sports and Entertainment Centre	N/A	boxscore
23/06/1990	Perth Wildcats	114–105	Adelaide 36ers	Perth Entertainment Centre	N/A	boxscore
23/06/1990	Canberra Cannons	102–105	North Melbourne Giants	AIS Arena	N/A	boxscore
23/06/1990	Newcastle Falcons	94–104	Sydney Kings	Newcastle Sports Entertainment Centre	N/A	boxscore
23/06/1990	Eastside Spectres	127–125	Melbourne Tigers	Melbourne Sports and Entertainment Centre	N/A	boxscore

=== Round 14 ===
Date	Home	Score	Away	Venue	Crowd	Box Score
29/06/1990	Perth Wildcats	115–99	Sydney Kings	Perth Entertainment Centre	N/A	boxscore
29/06/1990	Illawarra Hawks	106–97	Westside Saints	Beaton Park Stadium	N/A	boxscore
29/06/1990	North Melbourne Giants	112–109	Geelong Supercats	Melbourne Sports and Entertainment Centre	N/A	boxscore
29/06/1990	Hobart Tassie Devils	132–111	Newcastle Falcons	Derwent Entertainment Centre	N/A	boxscore
30/06/1990	Adelaide 36ers	114–103	Sydney Kings	Apollo Entertainment Centre	N/A	boxscore
30/06/1990	Eastside Spectres	120–117	Westside Saints	Melbourne Sports and Entertainment Centre	N/A	boxscore
30/06/1990	Canberra Cannons	124–131	Brisbane Bullets	AIS Arena	N/A	boxscore
1/07/1990	Melbourne Tigers	143–130	Newcastle Falcons	Melbourne Sports and Entertainment Centre	N/A	boxscore

=== Round 15 ===
Date	Home	Score	Away	Venue	Crowd	Box Score
6/07/1990	Illawarra Hawks	126–119	Geelong Supercats	Beaton Park Stadium	N/A	boxscore
6/07/1990	Perth Wildcats	125–95	Hobart Tassie Devils	Perth Entertainment Centre	N/A	boxscore
6/07/1990	North Melbourne Giants	97–95	Gold Coast Cougars	Melbourne Sports and Entertainment Centre	N/A	boxscore
7/07/1990	Adelaide 36ers	147–110	Hobart Tassie Devils	Apollo Entertainment Centre	N/A	boxscore
7/07/1990	Brisbane Bullets	94–110	Canberra Cannons	Brisbane Entertainment Centre	N/A	boxscore
7/07/1990	Sydney Kings	88–86	Geelong Supercats	Sydney Entertainment Centre	N/A	boxscore
7/07/1990	Eastside Spectres	145–115	Newcastle Falcons	Melbourne Sports and Entertainment Centre	N/A	boxscore
8/07/1990	Westside Saints	99–129	Gold Coast Cougars	Melbourne Sports and Entertainment Centre	N/A	boxscore

=== Round 16 ===
Date	Home	Score	Away	Venue	Crowd	Box Score
13/07/1990	Adelaide 36ers	108–94	Westside Saints	Apollo Entertainment Centre	N/A	boxscore
13/07/1990	North Melbourne Giants	133–112	Newcastle Falcons	Melbourne Sports and Entertainment Centre	N/A	boxscore
13/07/1990	Hobart Tassie Devils	114–105	Gold Coast Cougars	Derwent Entertainment Centre	N/A	boxscore
14/07/1990	Perth Wildcats	123–89	Westside Saints	Perth Entertainment Centre	N/A	boxscore
14/07/1990	Brisbane Bullets	111–115	Sydney Kings	Brisbane Entertainment Centre	N/A	boxscore
14/07/1990	Eastside Spectres	123–113	Geelong Supercats	Melbourne Sports and Entertainment Centre	N/A	boxscore
14/07/1990	Canberra Cannons	112–98	Newcastle Falcons	AIS Arena	N/A	boxscore
15/07/1990	Melbourne Tigers	134–104	Gold Coast Cougars	Melbourne Sports and Entertainment Centre	N/A	boxscore

=== Round 17 ===
Date	Home	Score	Away	Venue	Crowd	Box Score
20/07/1990	Gold Coast Cougars	134–119	Geelong Supercats	Carrara Indoor Stadium	N/A	boxscore
20/07/1990	Perth Wildcats	118–116	Eastside Spectres	Perth Entertainment Centre	N/A	boxscore
20/07/1990	North Melbourne Giants	134–119	Canberra Cannons	Melbourne Sports and Entertainment Centre	N/A	boxscore
21/07/1990	Adelaide 36ers	98–124	Eastside Spectres	Apollo Entertainment Centre	N/A	boxscore
21/07/1990	Brisbane Bullets	140–109	Illawarra Hawks	Brisbane Entertainment Centre	N/A	boxscore
21/07/1990	Newcastle Falcons	95–102	Westside Saints	Newcastle Sports Entertainment Centre	N/A	boxscore
21/07/1990	Hobart Tassie Devils	121–128	Canberra Cannons	Derwent Entertainment Centre	N/A	boxscore

=== Round 18 ===
Date	Home	Score	Away	Venue	Crowd	Box Score
27/07/1990	Adelaide 36ers	123–106	Melbourne Tigers	Apollo Entertainment Centre	N/A	boxscore
27/07/1990	Sydney Kings	106–98	Illawarra Hawks	Sydney Entertainment Centre	N/A	boxscore
27/07/1990	Newcastle Falcons	106–108	Brisbane Bullets	Newcastle Sports Entertainment Centre	N/A	boxscore
27/07/1990	Westside Saints	94–130	North Melbourne Giants	Melbourne Sports and Entertainment Centre	N/A	boxscore
28/07/1990	Perth Wildcats	122–107	Melbourne Tigers	Perth Entertainment Centre	N/A	boxscore
28/07/1990	Gold Coast Cougars	132–116	Illawarra Hawks	Carrara Indoor Stadium	N/A	boxscore
28/07/1990	Eastside Spectres	137–122	Brisbane Bullets	Melbourne Sports and Entertainment Centre	N/A	boxscore
28/07/1990	Geelong Supercats	131–123	North Melbourne Giants	Geelong Arena	N/A	boxscore

=== Round 19 ===
Date	Home	Score	Away	Venue	Crowd	Box Score
17/08/1990	Hobart Tassie Devils	104–115	Illawarra Hawks	Derwent Entertainment Centre	N/A	boxscore
24/08/1990	Sydney Kings	110–99	Eastside Spectres	Sydney Entertainment Centre	N/A	boxscore
24/08/1990	Illawarra Hawks	119–116	Adelaide 36ers	Beaton Park Stadium	N/A	boxscore
24/08/1990	North Melbourne Giants	96–117	Perth Wildcats	Melbourne Sports and Entertainment Centre	N/A	boxscore
24/08/1990	Geelong Supercats	123–115	Melbourne Tigers	Geelong Arena	N/A	boxscore
25/08/1990	Brisbane Bullets	107–116	Hobart Tassie Devils	Brisbane Entertainment Centre	N/A	boxscore
25/08/1990	Gold Coast Cougars	106–125	Eastside Spectres	Carrara Indoor Stadium	N/A	boxscore
25/08/1990	Newcastle Falcons	125–116	Adelaide 36ers	Newcastle Sports Entertainment Centre	N/A	boxscore
25/08/1990	Canberra Cannons	114–113	Perth Wildcats	AIS Arena	N/A	boxscore
25/08/1990	Westside Saints	99–121	Melbourne Tigers	Melbourne Sports and Entertainment Centre	N/A	boxscore

=== Round 20 ===
Date	Home	Score	Away	Venue	Crowd	Box Score
31/08/1990	Hobart Tassie Devils	121–138	Eastside Spectres	Derwent Entertainment Centre	N/A	boxscore
31/08/1990	Melbourne Tigers	113–109	Canberra Cannons	Melbourne Sports and Entertainment Centre	N/A	boxscore
31/08/1990	Geelong Supercats	129–119	Gold Coast Cougars	Geelong Arena	N/A	boxscore
1/09/1990	Adelaide 36ers	112–99	Perth Wildcats	Apollo Entertainment Centre	N/A	boxscore
1/09/1990	Brisbane Bullets	110–102	North Melbourne Giants	Brisbane Entertainment Centre	N/A	boxscore
1/09/1990	Illawarra Hawks	96–102	Canberra Cannons	Beaton Park Stadium	N/A	boxscore
1/09/1990	Westside Saints	99–106	Sydney Kings	Melbourne Sports and Entertainment Centre	N/A	boxscore
2/09/1990	Melbourne Tigers	128–127	Sydney Kings	Melbourne Sports and Entertainment Centre	N/A	boxscore

=== Round 21 ===
Date	Home	Score	Away	Venue	Crowd	Box Score
7/09/1990	Gold Coast Cougars	126–117	Hobart Tassie Devils	Carrara Indoor Stadium	N/A	boxscore
7/09/1990	North Melbourne Giants	111–118	Eastside Spectres	Melbourne Sports and Entertainment Centre	N/A	boxscore
7/09/1990	Geelong Supercats	150–118	Adelaide 36ers	Geelong Arena	N/A	boxscore
7/09/1990	Illawarra Hawks	108–115	Perth Wildcats	Beaton Park Stadium	N/A	boxscore
8/09/1990	Brisbane Bullets	132–133	Melbourne Tigers	Brisbane Entertainment Centre	N/A	boxscore
8/09/1990	Sydney Kings	114–105	Hobart Tassie Devils	Sydney Entertainment Centre	N/A	boxscore
8/09/1990	Newcastle Falcons	120–119	Perth Wildcats	Newcastle Sports Entertainment Centre	N/A	boxscore
8/09/1990	Canberra Cannons	115–99	Eastside Spectres	AIS Arena	N/A	boxscore
8/09/1990	Westside Saints	92–119	Adelaide 36ers	Melbourne Sports and Entertainment Centre	N/A	boxscore

=== Round 22 ===
Date	Home	Score	Away	Venue	Crowd	Box Score
14/09/1990	Adelaide 36ers	135–116	Gold Coast Cougars	Apollo Entertainment Centre	N/A	boxscore
14/09/1990	Illawarra Hawks	136–111	Sydney Kings	Beaton Park Stadium	N/A	boxscore
14/09/1990	North Melbourne Giants	135–100	Westside Saints	Melbourne Sports and Entertainment Centre	N/A	boxscore
14/09/1990	Hobart Tassie Devils	121–112	Geelong Supercats	Derwent Entertainment Centre	N/A	boxscore
15/09/1990	Perth Wildcats	98–94	Gold Coast Cougars	Perth Entertainment Centre	N/A	boxscore
15/09/1990	Brisbane Bullets	153–116	Newcastle Falcons	Brisbane Entertainment Centre	N/A	boxscore
15/09/1990	Eastside Spectres	83–102	Sydney Kings	Melbourne Sports and Entertainment Centre	N/A	boxscore
15/09/1990	Canberra Cannons	123–94	Westside Saints	AIS Arena	N/A	boxscore
16/09/1990	Melbourne Tigers	144–119	Geelong Supercats	Melbourne Sports and Entertainment Centre	N/A	boxscore

=== Round 23 ===
Date	Home	Score	Away	Venue	Crowd	Box Score
21/09/1990	Perth Wildcats	119–96	Brisbane Bullets	Perth Entertainment Centre	N/A	boxscore
21/09/1990	Gold Coast Cougars	116–121	Canberra Cannons	Carrara Indoor Stadium	N/A	boxscore
21/09/1990	Newcastle Falcons	119–108	Illawarra Hawks	Newcastle Sports Entertainment Centre	N/A	boxscore
21/09/1990	Melbourne Tigers	109–110	North Melbourne Giants	Melbourne Sports and Entertainment Centre	N/A	boxscore
21/09/1990	Geelong Supercats	152–113	Westside Saints	Geelong Arena	N/A	boxscore
22/09/1990	Adelaide 36ers	112–121	Brisbane Bullets	Apollo Entertainment Centre	N/A	boxscore
22/09/1990	Sydney Kings	104–95	Canberra Cannons	Sydney Entertainment Centre	N/A	boxscore
22/09/1990	Eastside Spectres	117–103	Illawarra Hawks	Melbourne Sports and Entertainment Centre	N/A	boxscore
22/09/1990	Hobart Tassie Devils	132–160	North Melbourne Giants	Derwent Entertainment Centre	N/A	boxscore

== Ladder ==
Pos	1990 NBL season											
Pos	Team	Pld	W	L	PCT	Last 5	Streak	Home	Away	PF	PA	PP
1	North Melbourne Giants	26	20	6	76.92%	3–2	W3	10–3	10–3	3111	2889	107.68%
2	Eastside Spectres^{1}	26	18	8	69.23%	3–2	W1	10–3	8–5	3028	2858	105.95%
3	Brisbane Bullets^{1}	26	18	8	69.23%	3–2	W1	9–4	9–4	3053	2902	105.20%
4	Melbourne Tigers^{2}	26	17	9	65.38%	4–1	L1	11–2	6–7	3226	3018	106.89%
5	Perth Wildcats^{2}	26	17	9	65.38%	3–2	W2	11–2	6–7	2926	2791	104.84%
6	Sydney Kings^{3}	26	16	10	61.54%	3–2	W2	9–4	7–6	2819	2710	104.02%
7	Canberra Cannons^{3}	26	16	10	61.54%	4–1	L1	10–3	6–7	2918	2843	102.64%
8	Illawarra Hawks	26	13	13	50.00%	1–4	L2	9–4	4–9	3056	3094	98.77%
9	Adelaide 36ers	26	12	14	46.15%	3–2	L1	9–4	3–10	3042	2997	101.50%
10	Geelong Supercats	26	11	15	42.31%	3–2	W1	8–5	3–10	3002	2997	100.17%
11	Gold Coast Cougars	26	9	17	34.62%	1–4	L3	6–7	3–10	2880	2978	96.71%
12	Hobart Tassie Devils	26	8	18	30.77%	1–4	L1	5–8	3–10	2926	3149	92.92%
13	Newcastle Falcons	26	4	22	15.38%	3–2	W1	4–9	0–13	2796	3135	89.19%
14	Westside Saints	26	3	23	11.54%	0–5	L7	2–11	1–12	2713	3135	86.54%

Updated to match(es) played on 22 September 1990. Source: NBL.com.au

The NBL tie-breaker system as outlined in the NBL Rules and Regulations states that in the case of an identical win–loss record, the results in games played between the teams will determine order of seeding.

^{1}Head-to-Head between Eastside Spectres and Brisbane Bullets (1-1). Eastside Spectres won For and Against (+7).

^{2}Head-to-Head between Melbourne Tigers and Perth Wildcats (1-1). Melbourne Tigers won For and Against (+11).

^{3}Sydney Kings won Head-to-Head (2-0).

== Finals ==
=== Playoff bracket ===
Elimination Finals
4	Melbourne Tigers	100	113	X
5	Perth Wildcats	122	123	X
3	Brisbane Bullets	87	124	107
6	Sydney Kings	98	96	104

Semifinals
1	North Melbourne Giants	111	131	110
5	Perth Wildcats	121	110	112
2	Eastside Spectres	111	119	X
3	Brisbane Bullets	121	120	X

Grand Final
3	Brisbane Bullets	106	106	86
5	Perth Wildcats	112	90	109

There were two best of three Elimination finals, two best of three semifinals, and then best of three grand final series. All three of these finals were sudden death.

=== Elimination Finals ===
Date	Home	Score	Away	Venue	Crowd	Box Score
26/09/1990	Sydney Kings	98–87	Brisbane Bullets	State Sports Centre	5,006	boxscore
26/09/1990	Perth Wildcats	122–100	Melbourne Tigers	Perth Entertainment Centre	8,200	boxscore
28/09/1990	Brisbane Bullets	124–96	Sydney Kings	Brisbane Entertainment Centre	N/A	boxscore
28/09/1990	Melbourne Tigers	113–123	Perth Wildcats	Melbourne Sports and Entertainment Centre	7,200	boxscore
30/09/1990	Brisbane Bullets	107–104	Sydney Kings	Brisbane Entertainment Centre	N/A	boxscore

=== Semifinals ===
Date	Home	Score	Away	Venue	Crowd	Box Score
6/10/1990	Perth Wildcats	121–111	North Melbourne Giants	Perth Entertainment Centre	8,200	boxscore
6/10/1990	Brisbane Bullets	121–111	Eastside Spectres	Brisbane Entertainment Centre	N/A	boxscore
12/10/1990	North Melbourne Giants	131–110	Perth Wildcats	Melbourne Sports and Entertainment Centre	7,200	boxscore
13/10/1990	Eastside Spectres	119–120	Brisbane Bullets	Melbourne Sports and Entertainment Centre	N/A	boxscore
14/10/1990	North Melbourne Giants	110–112	Perth Wildcats	Melbourne Sports and Entertainment Centre	7,200	boxscore

=== Grand Final ===
Date	Home	Score	Away	Venue	Crowd	Box Score
19/10/1990	Perth Wildcats	112–106	Brisbane Bullets	Perth Entertainment Centre	8,200	boxscore
26/10/1990	Brisbane Bullets	106–90	Perth Wildcats	Brisbane Entertainment Centre	13,221	boxscore
28/10/1990	Brisbane Bullets	86–109	Perth Wildcats	Brisbane Entertainment Centre	13,159	boxscore

== 1990 NBL statistics leaders ==
Category	Player	Team	Stat
Points per game	Derek Rucker	Brisbane Bullets	865 pts
Rebounds per game	James Bullock	Newcastle Falcons	16.2
Assists per game	Shane Heal	Geelong Supercats	8.3
Steals per game	Leroy Loggins	Brisbane Bullets	76 stls
Blocks per game	Daren Rowe	Geelong Supercats	84 blks
Field goal percentage	Norman Taylor	Wollongong Hawks	66.9%
Three-point percentage	Greg Hubbard	Wollongong Hawks	48.1%
Free throw percentage	Mike Ellis	Perth Wildcats	88.6%

== NBL awards ==
- Most Valuable Player: Derek Rucker, Brisbane Bullets
- Most Valuable Player Grand Final: Ricky Grace, Perth Wildcats
- Best Defensive Player: Leroy Loggins, Brisbane Bullets
- Most Improved Player: Shane Heal, Geelong Supercats
- Rookie of the Year: Justin Cass, Hobart Tassie Devils
- Coach of the Year: Brian Kerle, Brisbane Bullets

== All NBL Team ==
#	Player	Team
PG	Derek Rucker	Brisbane Bullets
SG	Andrew Gaze	Melbourne Tigers
SF	Leroy Loggins	Brisbane Bullets
PF	Scott Fisher	North Melbourne Giants
C	Andre Moore	Brisbane Bullets
