= 1994 NBL season =

- League: National Basketball League
- Sport: Basketball
- Duration: 7 April – 24 September 1994; 26 September – 15 October 1994 (Finals); 22 – 28 October 1994 (Grand Finals)
- Teams: 14
- TV partner: Network Ten

Regular season
- Season champions: Melbourne Tigers
- Season MVP: Andrew Gaze (Melbourne)
- Top scorer: Andrew Gaze (Melbourne)

Finals
- Champions: North Melbourne Giants (2nd title)
- Runners-up: Adelaide 36ers
- Finals MVP: Paul Rees (North Melbourne)

NBL seasons
- ← 1993 1995 →

The 1994 NBL season was the 16th season of competition since its establishment in 1979. A total of 14 teams contest the league.

== Clubs ==
Club	Location	Home Venue	Capacity	Founded	Head coach
Adelaide 36ers	Adelaide, South Australia	Clipsal Powerhouse	8,000	1982	(United States) Mike Dunlap
Brisbane Bullets	Brisbane, Queensland	Brisbane Entertainment Centre	13,500	1979	(United States) Bruce Palmer
Canberra Cannons	Canberra, Australian Capital Territory	AIS Arena	5,200	1979	(Australia) Barry Barnes
Geelong Supercats	(Victoria (state)) Geelong, Victoria	Geelong Arena	2,000	1982	(United States) Jim Calvin
Gold Coast Rollers	Gold Coast, Queensland	Carrara Indoor Stadium	2,992	1990	(Australia) Dave Claxton
Hobart Tassie Devils	Hobart, Tasmania	Derwent Entertainment Centre	5,400	1983	(Australia) Bill Tomlinson
Illawarra Hawks	Wollongong, New South Wales	Illawarra Basketball Stadium	2,000	1979	(Australia) Alan Black
Melbourne Tigers	(Victoria (state)) Melbourne, Victoria	National Tennis Centre at Flinders Park	15,400	1931	(Australia) Lindsay Gaze
Newcastle Falcons	Newcastle, New South Wales	Newcastle Entertainment Centre	4,658	1979	(Australia) Tom Wiseman
North Melbourne Giants	(Victoria (state)) Melbourne, Victoria	The Glass House	7,200	1980	(United States) Brett Brown
Perth Wildcats	Perth, Western Australia	Perth Entertainment Centre	8,200	1982	(Australia) Adrian Hurley
South East Melbourne Magic	(Victoria (state)) Melbourne, Victoria	National Tennis Centre at Flinders Park	15,400	1992	(United States) Brian Goorjian
Sydney Kings	Sydney, New South Wales	Sydney Entertainment Centre	12,500	1988	(United States) Bob Turner
Townsville Suns	Townsville, Queensland	Townsville Entertainment Centre	5,257	1993	(Australia) Mark Bragg

== Regular season ==
The 1994 regular season took place over 22 rounds between 7 April 1994 and 24 September 1994.

=== Round 1 ===
Date	Home	Score	Away	Venue	Crowd	Boxscore
7/04/1994	North Melbourne Giants	95–112	Perth Wildcats	Melbourne Sports and Entertainment Centre	N/A	boxscore
8/04/1994	Illawarra Hawks	91–123	South East Melbourne Magic	Beaton Park Stadium	N/A	boxscore
8/04/1994	Brisbane Bullets	116–103	Hobart Tassie Devils	Brisbane Entertainment Centre	N/A	boxscore
8/04/1994	Gold Coast Rollers	95–92	Adelaide 36ers	Carrara Indoor Stadium	N/A	boxscore
9/04/1994	Sydney Kings	110–100	South East Melbourne Magic	Sydney Entertainment Centre	N/A	boxscore
9/04/1994	Townsville Suns	97–83	Hobart Tassie Devils	Townsville Entertainment Centre	N/A	boxscore
9/04/1994	Melbourne Tigers	112–100	Geelong Supercats	Melbourne Park	N/A	boxscore
9/04/1994	Newcastle Falcons	93–95	Adelaide 36ers	Newcastle Entertainment Centre	N/A	boxscore
9/04/1994	Canberra Cannons	87–105	Perth Wildcats	AIS Arena	N/A	boxscore

=== Round 2 ===
Date	Home	Score	Away	Venue	Crowd	Boxscore
12/04/1994	Melbourne Tigers	107–103	Newcastle Falcons	Melbourne Park	N/A	boxscore
13/04/1994	South East Melbourne Magic	106–131	Brisbane Bullets	Melbourne Park	N/A	boxscore
15/04/1994	Sydney Kings	90–86	Gold Coast Rollers	Sydney Entertainment Centre	N/A	boxscore
15/04/1994	Canberra Cannons	126–101	Townsville Suns	AIS Arena	N/A	boxscore
16/04/1994	Hobart Tassie Devils	105–119	Brisbane Bullets	Derwent Entertainment Centre	N/A	boxscore
16/04/1994	Illawarra Hawks	96–82	Gold Coast Rollers	Beaton Park Stadium	N/A	boxscore
16/04/1994	Perth Wildcats	97–95	Adelaide 36ers	Perth Entertainment Centre	N/A	boxscore
16/04/1994	Geelong Supercats	110–102	Newcastle Falcons	Geelong Arena	N/A	boxscore
16/04/1994	North Melbourne Giants	122–86	Townsville Suns	Melbourne Sports and Entertainment Centre	N/A	boxscore

=== Round 3 ===
Date	Home	Score	Away	Venue	Crowd	Boxscore
21/04/1994	Perth Wildcats	90–121	North Melbourne Giants	Perth Entertainment Centre	N/A	boxscore
22/04/1994	Hobart Tassie Devils	102–109	Geelong Supercats	Derwent Entertainment Centre	N/A	boxscore
22/04/1994	Illawarra Hawks	112–97	Melbourne Tigers	Beaton Park Stadium	N/A	boxscore
23/04/1994	South East Melbourne Magic	120–99	Geelong Supercats	Melbourne Park	N/A	boxscore
23/04/1994	Sydney Kings	123–102	Melbourne Tigers	Sydney Entertainment Centre	N/A	boxscore
23/04/1994	Adelaide 36ers	83–84	North Melbourne Giants	Adelaide Arena	N/A	boxscore
23/04/1994	Townsville Suns	73–94	Gold Coast Rollers	Townsville Entertainment Centre	N/A	boxscore

=== Round 4 ===
Date	Home	Score	Away	Venue	Crowd	Boxscore
29/04/1994	South East Melbourne Magic	112–97	Hobart Tassie Devils	Melbourne Park	N/A	boxscore
29/04/1994	Perth Wildcats	93–89	Sydney Kings	Perth Entertainment Centre	N/A	boxscore
29/04/1994	Townsville Suns	89–94	Illawarra Hawks	Townsville Entertainment Centre	N/A	boxscore
29/04/1994	Gold Coast Rollers	111–89	Geelong Supercats	Carrara Indoor Stadium	N/A	boxscore
30/04/1994	Canberra Cannons	116–130	Melbourne Tigers	AIS Arena	N/A	boxscore
30/04/1994	Brisbane Bullets	126–112	Illawarra Hawks	Brisbane Entertainment Centre	N/A	boxscore
30/04/1994	Newcastle Falcons	130–106	Geelong Supercats	Newcastle Entertainment Centre	N/A	boxscore
1/05/1994	Adelaide 36ers	101–90	Sydney Kings	Adelaide Arena	N/A	boxscore

=== Round 5 ===
Date	Home	Score	Away	Venue	Crowd	Boxscore
6/05/1994	Illawarra Hawks	109–90	Hobart Tassie Devils	Beaton Park Stadium	N/A	boxscore
6/05/1994	Geelong Supercats	109–120	Brisbane Bullets	Geelong Arena	N/A	boxscore
6/05/1994	Newcastle Falcons	115–105	Townsville Suns	Newcastle Entertainment Centre	N/A	boxscore
6/05/1994	North Melbourne Giants	107–76	Canberra Cannons	Melbourne Sports and Entertainment Centre	N/A	boxscore
7/05/1994	Sydney Kings	106–91	Hobart Tassie Devils	Sydney Entertainment Centre	N/A	boxscore
7/05/1994	Adelaide 36ers	101–111	South East Melbourne Magic	Adelaide Arena	N/A	boxscore
7/05/1994	Melbourne Tigers	128–99	Brisbane Bullets	Melbourne Park	N/A	boxscore
7/05/1994	Gold Coast Rollers	80–87	Perth Wildcats	Carrara Indoor Stadium	N/A	boxscore

=== Round 6 ===
Date	Home	Score	Away	Venue	Crowd	Boxscore
13/05/1994	North Melbourne Giants	128–99	Newcastle Falcons	Melbourne Sports and Entertainment Centre	N/A	boxscore
13/05/1994	Townsville Suns	91–116	Adelaide 36ers	Townsville Entertainment Centre	N/A	boxscore
13/05/1994	Geelong Supercats	108–119	Perth Wildcats	Geelong Arena	N/A	boxscore
14/05/1994	Sydney Kings	120–102	Illawarra Hawks	Sydney Entertainment Centre	N/A	boxscore
14/05/1994	Brisbane Bullets	105–124	Adelaide 36ers	Brisbane Entertainment Centre	N/A	boxscore
14/05/1994	Melbourne Tigers	97–96	Perth Wildcats	Melbourne Park	N/A	boxscore
14/05/1994	Canberra Cannons	74–81	Newcastle Falcons	AIS Arena	N/A	boxscore
15/05/1994	Hobart Tassie Devils	90–88	Gold Coast Rollers	Derwent Entertainment Centre	N/A	boxscore
17/05/1994	South East Melbourne Magic	116–94	Gold Coast Rollers	Melbourne Park	N/A	boxscore

=== Round 7 ===
Date	Home	Score	Away	Venue	Crowd	Boxscore
20/05/1994	South East Melbourne Magic	93–102	North Melbourne Giants	Melbourne Park	N/A	boxscore
20/05/1994	Sydney Kings	99–88	Canberra Cannons	Sydney Entertainment Centre	N/A	boxscore
20/05/1994	Adelaide 36ers	97–102	Melbourne Tigers	Adelaide Arena	N/A	boxscore
21/05/1994	Illawarra Hawks	118–102	Canberra Cannons	Beaton Park Stadium	N/A	boxscore
21/05/1994	Geelong Supercats	113–114	North Melbourne Giants	Geelong Arena	N/A	boxscore
21/05/1994	Brisbane Bullets	99–88	Townsville Suns	Brisbane Entertainment Centre	N/A	boxscore
21/05/1994	Newcastle Falcons	97–100	Gold Coast Rollers	Newcastle Entertainment Centre	N/A	boxscore
21/05/1994	Perth Wildcats	110–99	Hobart Tassie Devils	Perth Entertainment Centre	N/A	boxscore

=== Round 8 ===
Date	Home	Score	Away	Venue	Crowd	Boxscore
27/05/1994	Townsville Suns	95–115	Sydney Kings	Townsville Entertainment Centre	N/A	boxscore
27/05/1994	Gold Coast Rollers	108–98	Melbourne Tigers	Carrara Indoor Stadium	N/A	boxscore
27/05/1994	North Melbourne Giants	131–105	Geelong Supercats	Melbourne Sports and Entertainment Centre	N/A	boxscore
28/05/1994	Adelaide 36ers	112–83	Hobart Tassie Devils	Adelaide Arena	N/A	boxscore
28/05/1994	Newcastle Falcons	110–127	Melbourne Tigers	Newcastle Entertainment Centre	N/A	boxscore
28/05/1994	Canberra Cannons	114–105	Geelong Supercats	AIS Arena	N/A	boxscore
28/05/1994	Perth Wildcats	106–113	South East Melbourne Magic	Perth Entertainment Centre	N/A	boxscore
28/05/1994	Brisbane Bullets	99–97	Sydney Kings	Brisbane Entertainment Centre	N/A	boxscore

=== Round 9 ===
Date	Home	Score	Away	Venue	Crowd	Boxscore
3/06/1994	Townsville Suns	91–131	Perth Wildcats	Townsville Entertainment Centre	N/A	boxscore
3/06/1994	Geelong Supercats	89–105	Illawarra Hawks	Geelong Arena	N/A	boxscore
3/06/1994	Newcastle Falcons	105–103	South East Melbourne Magic	Newcastle Entertainment Centre	N/A	boxscore
4/06/1994	Brisbane Bullets	127–126	Perth Wildcats	Brisbane Entertainment Centre	N/A	boxscore
4/06/1994	Melbourne Tigers	115–105	Illawarra Hawks	Melbourne Park	N/A	boxscore
4/06/1994	Gold Coast Rollers	100–96	South East Melbourne Magic	Carrara Indoor Stadium	N/A	boxscore
4/06/1994	Canberra Cannons	90–97	North Melbourne Giants	AIS Arena	N/A	boxscore
7/07/1994	Hobart Tassie Devils	82–101	Sydney Kings	Derwent Entertainment Centre	N/A	boxscore

=== Round 10 ===
Date	Home	Score	Away	Venue	Crowd	Boxscore
10/06/1994	Hobart Tassie Devils	115–131	Melbourne Tigers	Derwent Entertainment Centre	N/A	boxscore
10/06/1994	Adelaide 36ers	95–94	Geelong Supercats	Adelaide Arena	N/A	boxscore
10/06/1994	Gold Coast Rollers	110–85	Townsville Suns	Carrara Indoor Stadium	N/A	boxscore
10/06/1994	North Melbourne Giants	114–115	Brisbane Bullets	Melbourne Sports and Entertainment Centre	N/A	boxscore
11/06/1994	South East Melbourne Magic	110–103	Melbourne Tigers	Melbourne Park	N/A	boxscore
11/06/1994	Illawarra Hawks	87–98	Brisbane Bullets	Beaton Park Stadium	N/A	boxscore
11/06/1994	Perth Wildcats	101–75	Canberra Cannons	Perth Entertainment Centre	N/A	boxscore
11/06/1994	Newcastle Falcons	108–97	Sydney Kings	Newcastle Entertainment Centre	N/A	boxscore

=== Round 11 ===
Date	Home	Score	Away	Venue	Crowd	Boxscore
17/06/1994	Hobart Tassie Devils	93–92	Perth Wildcats	Derwent Entertainment Centre	N/A	boxscore
17/06/1994	Townsville Suns	87–92	Newcastle Falcons	Townsville Entertainment Centre	N/A	boxscore
17/06/1994	Melbourne Tigers	107–99	Adelaide 36ers	Melbourne Park	N/A	boxscore
18/06/1994	Illawarra Hawks	98–119	Geelong Supercats	Beaton Park Stadium	N/A	boxscore
18/06/1994	South East Melbourne Magic	112–94	Perth Wildcats	Melbourne Park	N/A	boxscore
18/06/1994	Sydney Kings	98–118	North Melbourne Giants	Sydney Entertainment Centre	N/A	boxscore
18/06/1994	Brisbane Bullets	100–119	Newcastle Falcons	Brisbane Entertainment Centre	N/A	boxscore
18/06/1994	Canberra Cannons	92–107	Adelaide 36ers	AIS Arena	N/A	boxscore

=== Round 12 ===
Date	Home	Score	Away	Venue	Crowd	Boxscore
24/06/1994	Adelaide 36ers	110–74	Illawarra Hawks	Adelaide Arena	N/A	boxscore
24/06/1994	Melbourne Tigers	127–105	Hobart Tassie Devils	Melbourne Park	N/A	boxscore
25/06/1994	South East Melbourne Magic	116–88	Newcastle Falcons	Melbourne Park	N/A	boxscore
25/06/1994	Sydney Kings	117–106	Brisbane Bullets	Sydney Entertainment Centre	N/A	boxscore
25/06/1994	Perth Wildcats	93–86	Illawarra Hawks	Perth Entertainment Centre	N/A	boxscore
25/06/1994	Geelong Supercats	111–98	Hobart Tassie Devils	Geelong Arena	N/A	boxscore
25/06/1994	Canberra Cannons	100–98	Gold Coast Rollers	AIS Arena	N/A	boxscore
26/06/1994	North Melbourne Giants	106–89	Gold Coast Rollers	Melbourne Sports and Entertainment Centre	N/A	boxscore

=== Round 13 ===
Date	Home	Score	Away	Venue	Crowd	Boxscore
1/07/1994	Adelaide 36ers	112–83	Townsville Suns	Adelaide Arena	N/A	boxscore
1/07/1994	Melbourne Tigers	97–95	Gold Coast Rollers	Melbourne Park	N/A	boxscore
2/07/1994	Illawarra Hawks	87–86	North Melbourne Giants	Beaton Park Stadium	N/A	boxscore
2/07/1994	Hobart Tassie Devils	97–114	Newcastle Falcons	Derwent Entertainment Centre	N/A	boxscore
2/07/1994	South East Melbourne Magic	128–97	Sydney Kings	Melbourne Park	N/A	boxscore
2/07/1994	Perth Wildcats	112–83	Townsville Suns	Perth Entertainment Centre	N/A	boxscore
2/07/1994	Geelong Supercats	94–95	Gold Coast Rollers	Geelong Arena	N/A	boxscore
2/07/1994	Canberra Cannons	113–125	Brisbane Bullets	AIS Arena	N/A	boxscore

=== Round 14 ===
Date	Home	Score	Away	Venue	Crowd	Boxscore
8/07/1994	Townsville Suns	114–90	Canberra Cannons	Townsville Entertainment Centre	N/A	boxscore
8/07/1994	Geelong Supercats	101–110	Adelaide 36ers	Geelong Arena	N/A	boxscore
8/07/1994	Newcastle Falcons	111–80	Perth Wildcats	Newcastle Entertainment Centre	N/A	boxscore
8/07/1994	Gold Coast Rollers	91–107	North Melbourne Giants	Carrara Indoor Stadium	N/A	boxscore
9/07/1994	Illawarra Hawks	79–88	Sydney Kings	Beaton Park Stadium	N/A	boxscore
9/07/1994	Brisbane Bullets	137–93	Canberra Cannons	Brisbane Entertainment Centre	N/A	boxscore
11/07/1994	Melbourne Tigers	104–90	South East Melbourne Magic	Melbourne Park	15,149	boxscore

=== Round 15 ===
Date	Home	Score	Away	Venue	Crowd	Boxscore
15/07/1994	Perth Wildcats	118–110	Geelong Supercats	Perth Entertainment Centre	N/A	boxscore
15/07/1994	Hobart Tassie Devils	97–100	Canberra Cannons	Derwent Entertainment Centre	N/A	boxscore
15/07/1994	Brisbane Bullets	119–125	Melbourne Tigers	Brisbane Entertainment Centre	N/A	boxscore
15/07/1994	North Melbourne Giants	92–115	Adelaide 36ers	Melbourne Sports and Entertainment Centre	N/A	boxscore
16/07/1994	Gold Coast Rollers	95–91	Sydney Kings	Carrara Indoor Stadium	N/A	boxscore
16/07/1994	South East Melbourne Magic	129–83	Canberra Cannons	Melbourne Park	N/A	boxscore
16/07/1994	Townsville Suns	114–117	Melbourne Tigers	Townsville Entertainment Centre	N/A	boxscore
16/07/1994	Newcastle Falcons	85–87	Illawarra Hawks	Newcastle Entertainment Centre	N/A	boxscore

=== Round 16 ===
Date	Home	Score	Away	Venue	Crowd	Boxscore
22/07/1994	Hobart Tassie Devils	92–93	Townsville Suns	Derwent Entertainment Centre	N/A	boxscore
22/07/1994	Geelong Supercats	92–95	Sydney Kings	Geelong Arena	N/A	boxscore
22/07/1994	Newcastle Falcons	96–126	Brisbane Bullets	Newcastle Entertainment Centre	N/A	boxscore
22/07/1994	North Melbourne Giants	101–80	Illawarra Hawks	Melbourne Sports and Entertainment Centre	N/A	boxscore
23/07/1994	Melbourne Tigers	102–126	Sydney Kings	Melbourne Park	15,099	boxscore
23/07/1994	Adelaide 36ers	111–74	Perth Wildcats	Adelaide Arena	N/A	boxscore
23/07/1994	Gold Coast Rollers	87–95	Brisbane Bullets	Carrara Indoor Stadium	N/A	boxscore
23/07/1994	Canberra Cannons	103–88	Illawarra Hawks	AIS Arena	N/A	boxscore
24/07/1994	South East Melbourne Magic	160–106	Townsville Suns	Melbourne Park	N/A	boxscore

=== Round 17 ===
Date	Home	Score	Away	Venue	Crowd	Boxscore
19/08/1994	Hobart Tassie Devils	87–101	North Melbourne Giants	Derwent Entertainment Centre	N/A	boxscore
19/08/1994	Illawarra Hawks	93–95	Townsville Suns	Beaton Park Stadium	N/A	boxscore
19/08/1994	Perth Wildcats	118–108	Brisbane Bullets	Perth Entertainment Centre	N/A	boxscore
19/08/1994	Geelong Supercats	100–112	South East Melbourne Magic	Geelong Arena	N/A	boxscore
19/08/1994	Newcastle Falcons	100–88	Canberra Cannons	Newcastle Entertainment Centre	N/A	boxscore
20/08/1994	Sydney Kings	115–107	Townsville Suns	Sydney Entertainment Centre	N/A	boxscore
20/08/1994	Adelaide 36ers	113–102	Brisbane Bullets	Adelaide Arena	N/A	boxscore
20/08/1994	North Melbourne Giants	108–115	Melbourne Tigers	Melbourne Sports and Entertainment Centre	N/A	boxscore
20/08/1994	Gold Coast Rollers	88–95	Canberra Cannons	Carrara Indoor Stadium	N/A	boxscore

=== Round 18 ===
Date	Home	Score	Away	Venue	Crowd	Boxscore
26/08/1994	Illawarra Hawks	108–98	Adelaide 36ers	Beaton Park Stadium	N/A	boxscore
26/08/1994	Townsville Suns	111–140	Geelong Supercats	Townsville Entertainment Centre	N/A	boxscore
26/08/1994	Gold Coast Rollers	112–91	Hobart Tassie Devils	Carrara Indoor Stadium	N/A	boxscore
26/08/1994	North Melbourne Giants	86–84	South East Melbourne Magic	Melbourne Sports and Entertainment Centre	N/A	boxscore
27/08/1994	Sydney Kings	83–96	Adelaide 36ers	Sydney Entertainment Centre	N/A	boxscore
27/08/1994	Perth Wildcats	131–108	Melbourne Tigers	Perth Entertainment Centre	N/A	boxscore
27/08/1994	Newcastle Falcons	124–114	Hobart Tassie Devils	Newcastle Entertainment Centre	N/A	boxscore
27/08/1994	Brisbane Bullets	153–106	Geelong Supercats	Brisbane Entertainment Centre	N/A	boxscore
30/08/1994	Canberra Cannons	118–121	South East Melbourne Magic	AIS Arena	N/A	boxscore

=== Round 19 ===
Date	Home	Score	Away	Venue	Crowd	Boxscore
2/09/1994	Hobart Tassie Devils	81–87	Illawarra Hawks	Derwent Entertainment Centre	N/A	boxscore
2/09/1994	Adelaide 36ers	90–85	Newcastle Falcons	Adelaide Arena	N/A	boxscore
2/09/1994	Geelong Supercats	112–114	Townsville Suns	Geelong Arena	N/A	boxscore
2/09/1994	North Melbourne Giants	108–93	Sydney Kings	Melbourne Sports and Entertainment Centre	N/A	boxscore
3/09/1994	South East Melbourne Magic	103–90	Illawarra Hawks	Melbourne Park	N/A	boxscore
3/09/1994	Perth Wildcats	83–92	Newcastle Falcons	Perth Entertainment Centre	N/A	boxscore
3/09/1994	Brisbane Bullets	113–105	Gold Coast Rollers	Brisbane Entertainment Centre	N/A	boxscore
3/09/1994	Canberra Cannons	96–98	Sydney Kings	AIS Arena	N/A	boxscore
4/09/1994	Melbourne Tigers	129–88	Townsville Suns	Melbourne Park	N/A	boxscore

=== Round 20 ===
Date	Home	Score	Away	Venue	Crowd	Boxscore
9/09/1994	Hobart Tassie Devils	96–114	Adelaide 36ers	Derwent Entertainment Centre	N/A	boxscore
9/09/1994	Illawarra Hawks	98–97	Perth Wildcats	Beaton Park Stadium	N/A	boxscore
9/09/1994	Townsville Suns	96–132	North Melbourne Giants	Townsville Entertainment Centre	N/A	boxscore
9/09/1994	Geelong Supercats	103–99	Canberra Cannons	Geelong Arena	N/A	boxscore
10/09/1994	South East Melbourne Magic	104–101	Adelaide 36ers	Melbourne Park	N/A	boxscore
10/09/1994	Sydney Kings	96–99	Perth Wildcats	Sydney Entertainment Centre	N/A	boxscore
10/09/1994	Brisbane Bullets	135–125	North Melbourne Giants	Brisbane Entertainment Centre	N/A	boxscore
10/09/1994	Gold Coast Rollers	104–113	Newcastle Falcons	Carrara Indoor Stadium	N/A	boxscore
11/09/1994	Melbourne Tigers	120–106	Canberra Cannons	Melbourne Park	N/A	boxscore

=== Round 21 ===
Date	Home	Score	Away	Venue	Crowd	Boxscore
16/09/1994	Sydney Kings	116–94	Newcastle Falcons	Sydney Entertainment Centre	N/A	boxscore
16/09/1994	Adelaide 36ers	102–90	Gold Coast Rollers	Adelaide Arena	N/A	boxscore
16/09/1994	Townsville Suns	108–107	South East Melbourne Magic	Townsville Entertainment Centre	N/A	boxscore
16/09/1994	Geelong Supercats	131–115	Melbourne Tigers	Geelong Arena	N/A	boxscore
16/09/1994	Canberra Cannons	107–101	Hobart Tassie Devils	AIS Arena	N/A	boxscore
17/09/1994	Illawarra Hawks	89–87	Newcastle Falcons	Beaton Park Stadium	N/A	boxscore
17/09/1994	Perth Wildcats	90–76	Gold Coast Rollers	Perth Entertainment Centre	N/A	boxscore
17/09/1994	Brisbane Bullets	87–116	South East Melbourne Magic	Brisbane Entertainment Centre	N/A	boxscore
18/09/1994	North Melbourne Giants	119–88	Hobart Tassie Devils	Melbourne Sports and Entertainment Centre	N/A	boxscore

=== Round 22 ===
Date	Home	Score	Away	Venue	Crowd	Boxscore
23/09/1994	Hobart Tassie Devils	90–112	South East Melbourne Magic	Derwent Entertainment Centre	N/A	boxscore
23/09/1994	Melbourne Tigers	110–105	North Melbourne Giants	Melbourne Park	15,122	boxscore
23/09/1994	Townsville Suns	105–141	Brisbane Bullets	Townsville Entertainment Centre	N/A	boxscore
24/09/1994	Sydney Kings	102–97	Geelong Supercats	Sydney Entertainment Centre	N/A	boxscore
24/09/1994	Adelaide 36ers	107–76	Canberra Cannons	Adelaide Arena	N/A	boxscore
24/09/1994	Gold Coast Rollers	94–98	Illawarra Hawks	Carrara Indoor Stadium	N/A	boxscore
24/09/1994	Newcastle Falcons	100–105	North Melbourne Giants	Newcastle Entertainment Centre	N/A	boxscore

== Ladder ==
Pos	1994 NBL season											
Pos	Team	Pld	W	L	PCT	Last 5	Streak	Home	Away	PF	PA	PP
1	Melbourne Tigers^{1}	26	19	7	73.08%	3–2	W1	12–1	7–6	2925	2811	104.06%
2	North Melbourne Giants^{1}	26	19	7	73.08%	3–2	W1	9–4	10–3	2814	2530	111.23%
3	S.E. Melbourne Magic^{2}	26	18	8	69.23%	4–1	W2	11–2	7–6	2897	2591	111.81%
4	Adelaide 36ers^{2}	26	18	8	69.23%	4–1	W2	10–3	8–5	2696	2412	111.77%
5	Brisbane Bullets^{2}	26	18	8	69.23%	4–1	W1	9–4	9–4	3001	2837	105.78%
6	Perth Wildcats^{3}	26	16	10	61.54%	3–2	W2	10–3	6–7	2654	2561	103.63%
7	Sydney Kings^{3}	26	16	10	61.54%	3–2	W2	10–3	6–7	2652	2564	103.43%
8	Illawarra Hawks^{4}	26	13	13	50.00%	4–1	W3	8–5	5–8	2473	2571	96.19%
9	Newcastle Falcons^{4}	26	13	13	50.00%	2–3	L3	7–6	6–7	2643	2634	100.34%
10	Gold Coast Rollers	26	10	16	38.46%	0–5	L5	7–6	3–10	2467	2501	98.64%
11	Canberra Cannons^{5}	26	7	19	26.92%	1–4	L1	5–8	2–11	2507	2777	90.28%
12	Geelong Supercats^{5}	26	7	19	26.92%	2–3	L1	4–9	3–10	2752	2895	95.06%
13	Townsville Suns	26	6	20	23.08%	2–3	L1	3–10	3–10	2505	2949	84.94%
14	Hobart Tassie Devils	26	2	24	07.69%	0–5	L13	2–11	0–13	2470	2823	87.50%

Updated to match(es) played on 24 September 1994. Source: NBL.com.au

The NBL tie-breaker system as outlined in the NBL Rules and Regulations states that in the case of an identical win–loss record, the results in games played between the teams will determine order of seeding.

^{1}Melbourne Tigers won Head-to-Head (2-0).

^{2}3-way Head-to-Head between South East Melbourne Magic (3-1), Adelaide 36ers (2-2) and Brisbane Bullets (1-3).

^{3}Perth Wildcats won Head-to-Head (2-0).

^{4}Illawarra Hawks won Head-to-Head (2-0).

^{5}Head-to-Head between Canberra Cannons and Geelong Supercats (1-1). Canberra Cannons won For and Against (+5).

== Finals ==
=== Playoff bracket ===
Quarterfinals
1	Melbourne Tigers	107	119	X
8	Illawarra Hawks	85	83	X
4	Adelaide 36ers	105	99	101
5	Brisbane Bullets	116	91	84
3	S.E. Melbourne Magic	113	100	X
6	Perth Wildcats	82	86	X
2	North Melbourne Giants	109	112	104
7	Sydney Kings	131	91	95

Semifinals
1	Melbourne Tigers	88	101	X
4	Adelaide 36ers	101	110	X
2	North Melbourne Giants	108	79	X
3	S.E. Melbourne Magic	87	76	X

Grand Final
2	North Melbourne Giants	95	117	X
4	Adelaide 36ers	93	97	X

=== Quarter-finals ===
Date	Home	Score	Away	Venue	Crowd	Boxscore
26/09/1994	Sydney Kings	131–109	North Melbourne Giants	Sydney Entertainment Centre	N/A	boxscore
28/09/1994	Illawarra Hawks	85–107	Melbourne Tigers	Beaton Park Stadium	N/A	boxscore
28/09/1994	Perth Wildcats	82–113	South East Melbourne Magic	Burswood Dome	N/A	boxscore
28/09/1994	Brisbane Bullets	116–105	Adelaide 36ers	Brisbane Entertainment Centre	N/A	boxscore
30/09/1994	Melbourne Tigers	119–83	Illawarra Hawks	Melbourne Park	N/A	boxscore
30/09/1994	North Melbourne Giants	112–91	Sydney Kings	Melbourne Sports and Entertainment Centre	N/A	boxscore
30/09/1994	Adelaide 36ers	99–91	Brisbane Bullets	Adelaide Arena	N/A	boxscore
2/10/1994	South East Melbourne Magic	100–86	Perth Wildcats	Melbourne Park	N/A	boxscore
2/10/1994	Adelaide 36ers	101–84	Brisbane Bullets	Adelaide Arena	N/A	boxscore
2/10/1994	North Melbourne Giants	104–95	Sydney Kings	Melbourne Sports and Entertainment Centre	N/A	boxscore

=== Semi-finals ===
Date	Home	Score	Away	Venue	Crowd	Boxscore
8/10/1994	South East Melbourne Magic	87–108	North Melbourne Giants	Melbourne Park	N/A	boxscore
8/10/1994	Adelaide 36ers	101–88	Melbourne Tigers	Adelaide Arena	N/A	boxscore
14/10/1994	Melbourne Tigers	101–110	Adelaide 36ers	Melbourne Park	N/A	boxscore
15/10/1994	North Melbourne Giants	79–76	South East Melbourne Magic	Melbourne Sports and Entertainment Centre	N/A	boxscore

=== Grand Final ===
Date	Home	Score	Away	Venue	Crowd	Boxscore
22/10/1994	Adelaide 36ers	93–95	North Melbourne Giants	Adelaide Arena	N/A	boxscore
28/10/1994	North Melbourne Giants	117–97	Adelaide 36ers	Melbourne Sports and Entertainment Centre	N/A	boxscore

== 1994 NBL statistics leaders ==
Category	Player	Team	Stat
Points per game	Andrew Gaze	Melbourne Tigers	33.4
Rebounds per game	Mark Bradtke	Melbourne Tigers	12.9
Assists per game	Derek Rucker	Newcastle Falcons	10.6
Steals per game	Darryl McDonald	North Melbourne Giants	4.5
Blocks per game	Keith Nelson	Hobart Tassie Devils	2.9
Free throw percentage	Andrew Gaze	Melbourne Tigers	90.5%

== NBL awards ==
- Most Valuable Player: Andrew Gaze, Melbourne Tigers
- Most Valuable Player Grand Final: Paul Rees, North Melbourne Giants
- Best Defensive Player: Darren Lucas, South East Melbourne Magic
- Most Improved Player: Chris Blakemore, Adelaide 36ers
- Rookie of the Year: Sam Mackinnon, South East Melbourne Magic
- Coach of the Year: Brett Brown, North Melbourne Giants

== All NBL Team ==
#	Player	Team
PG	Darryl McDonald	North Melbourne Giants
SG	Andrew Gaze	Melbourne Tigers
SF	Leroy Loggins	Brisbane Bullets
PF	Leon Trimmingham	Sydney Kings
C	Mark Bradtke	Melbourne Tigers
