= 1992 NBL season =

- League: National Basketball League
- Sport: Basketball
- Duration: 3 April – 26 September 1992; 28 September – 18 October 1992 (Finals); 24 October – 1 November 1992 (Grand Finals)
- Teams: 13
- TV partner: Network Ten

Regular season
- Season champions: South East Melbourne Magic
- Season MVP: Scott Fisher (North Melbourne); Andrew Gaze (Melbourne)
- Top scorer: Andrew Gaze (Melbourne)

Finals
- Champions: South East Melbourne Magic (1st title)
- Runners-up: Melbourne Tigers
- Finals MVP: Bruce Bolden (South East Melbourne)

NBL seasons
- ← 1991 1993 →

The 1992 NBL season was the 14th season of competition since its establishment in 1979. A total of 13 teams contested the league, Southern Melbourne having merged with Eastside Melbourne to form the South-East Melbourne Magic during the off season.

== Clubs ==
Club	Location	Home Venue	Capacity	Founded	Head coach
Adelaide 36ers	Adelaide, South Australia	Clipsal Powerhouse	8,000	1982	(Australia) Don Shipway
Brisbane Bullets	Brisbane, Queensland	Brisbane Entertainment Centre	13,500	1979	(Australia) Brian Kerle
Canberra Cannons	Canberra, Australian Capital Territory	AIS Arena	5,200	1979	(Australia) Barry Barnes
Geelong Supercats	(Victoria (state)) Geelong, Victoria	Geelong Arena	2,000	1982	(Australia) Steve Breheny
Gold Coast Rollers	Gold Coast, Queensland	Carrara Indoor Stadium	2,992	1990	(Australia) Dave Claxton
Hobart Tassie Devils	Hobart, Tasmania	Derwent Entertainment Centre	5,400	1983	(United States) Cal Bruton
Illawarra Hawks	Wollongong, New South Wales	Illawarra Basketball Stadium	2,000	1979	(Australia) Dave Lindstrom
Melbourne Tigers	(Victoria (state)) Melbourne, Victoria	National Tennis Centre at Flinders Park	15,400	1931	(Australia) Lindsay Gaze
Newcastle Falcons	Newcastle, New South Wales	Newcastle Entertainment Centre	4,658	1979	(Australia) Tom Wisman
North Melbourne Giants	(Victoria (state)) Melbourne, Victoria	The Glass House	7,200	1980	(United States) Bruce Palmer
Perth Wildcats	Perth, Western Australia	Perth Entertainment Centre	8,200	1982	(United States) Murray Arnold
South East Melbourne Magic	(Victoria (state)) Melbourne, Victoria	National Tennis Centre at Flinders Park	15,400	1992	(United States) Brian Goorjian
Sydney Kings	Sydney, New South Wales	Sydney Entertainment Centre	12,500	1988	(United States) Bob Turner

== Regular season ==
The 1992 regular season took place over 22 rounds between 3 April 1992 and 26 September 1992.

=== Round 1 ===
Date	Home	Score	Away	Venue	Crowd	Boxscore
3/04/1992	Melbourne Tigers	112–104	Canberra Cannons	Melbourne Park	N/A	boxscore
3/04/1992	Gold Coast Rollers	125–110	Newcastle Falcons	Carrara Indoor Stadium	N/A	boxscore
4/04/1992	Adelaide 36ers	106–84	North Melbourne Giants	Adelaide Arena	N/A	boxscore
4/04/1992	Perth Wildcats	95–89	Geelong Supercats	Perth Entertainment Centre	N/A	boxscore
4/04/1992	Brisbane Bullets	138–116	Hobart Tassie Devils	Brisbane Entertainment Centre	N/A	boxscore
4/04/1992	Sydney Kings	95–86	Canberra Cannons	Sydney Entertainment Centre	N/A	boxscore
4/04/1992	South East Melbourne Magic	83–82	Illawarra Hawks	Melbourne Park	N/A	boxscore

=== Round 2 ===
Date	Home	Score	Away	Venue	Crowd	Boxscore
10/04/1992	Newcastle Falcons	110–108	North Melbourne Giants	Newcastle Entertainment Centre	N/A	boxscore
10/04/1992	Brisbane Bullets	135–127	Geelong Supercats	Brisbane Entertainment Centre	N/A	boxscore
10/04/1992	Hobart Tassie Devils	102–118	Perth Wildcats	Derwent Entertainment Centre	N/A	boxscore
11/04/1992	Gold Coast Rollers	103–102	North Melbourne Giants	Carrara Indoor Stadium	N/A	boxscore
11/04/1992	Sydney Kings	126–116	Geelong Supercats	Sydney Entertainment Centre	N/A	boxscore
11/04/1992	Illawarra Hawks	108–91	Canberra Cannons	Beaton Park Stadium	N/A	boxscore
11/04/1992	Melbourne Tigers	85–76	Perth Wildcats	Melbourne Park	N/A	boxscore
12/04/1992	South East Melbourne Magic	93–89	Adelaide 36ers	Melbourne Park	N/A	boxscore

=== Round 3 ===
Date	Home	Score	Away	Venue	Crowd	Boxscore
15/04/1992	North Melbourne Giants	121–110	Illawarra Hawks	Melbourne Sports and Entertainment Centre	N/A	boxscore
18/04/1992	Perth Wildcats	82–109	Sydney Kings	Perth Entertainment Centre	N/A	boxscore
18/04/1992	Adelaide 36ers	109–126	Melbourne Tigers	Adelaide Arena	N/A	boxscore
18/04/1992	Geelong Supercats	117–106	Hobart Tassie Devils	Geelong Arena	N/A	boxscore

=== Round 4 ===
Date	Home	Score	Away	Venue	Crowd	Boxscore
24/04/1992	Gold Coast Rollers	118–110	Melbourne Tigers	Carrara Indoor Stadium	N/A	boxscore
24/04/1992	Newcastle Falcons	118–113	Adelaide 36ers	Newcastle Entertainment Centre	N/A	boxscore
24/04/1992	Geelong Supercats	120–124	Canberra Cannons	Geelong Arena	N/A	boxscore
25/04/1992	Perth Wildcats	116–90	Illawarra Hawks	Perth Entertainment Centre	N/A	boxscore
25/04/1992	Brisbane Bullets	123–125	Melbourne Tigers	Brisbane Entertainment Centre	N/A	boxscore
25/04/1992	Sydney Kings	100–99	Adelaide 36ers	Sydney Entertainment Centre	N/A	boxscore
25/04/1992	Hobart Tassie Devils	119–99	Canberra Cannons	Derwent Entertainment Centre	N/A	boxscore
25/04/1992	North Melbourne Giants	123–93	South East Melbourne Magic	Melbourne Sports and Entertainment Centre	N/A	boxscore

=== Round 5 ===
Date	Home	Score	Away	Venue	Crowd	Boxscore
1/05/1992	Illawarra Hawks	113–100	Brisbane Bullets	Beaton Park Stadium	N/A	boxscore
1/05/1992	North Melbourne Giants	92–90	Hobart Tassie Devils	Melbourne Sports and Entertainment Centre	N/A	boxscore
2/05/1992	Adelaide 36ers	84–88	Perth Wildcats	Adelaide Arena	N/A	boxscore
2/05/1992	Sydney Kings	91–83	Gold Coast Rollers	Sydney Entertainment Centre	N/A	boxscore
2/05/1992	Canberra Cannons	114–100	Brisbane Bullets	AIS Arena	N/A	boxscore
2/05/1992	Geelong Supercats	120–145	Melbourne Tigers	Geelong Arena	N/A	boxscore
5/05/1992	South East Melbourne Magic	123–91	Hobart Tassie Devils	Melbourne Park	N/A	boxscore

=== Round 6 ===
Date	Home	Score	Away	Venue	Crowd	Boxscore
8/05/1992	Illawarra Hawks	91–108	Newcastle Falcons	Beaton Park Stadium	N/A	boxscore
9/05/1992	Perth Wildcats	84–102	South East Melbourne Magic	Perth Entertainment Centre	N/A	boxscore
9/05/1992	Brisbane Bullets	104–111	Gold Coast Rollers	Brisbane Entertainment Centre	N/A	boxscore
9/05/1992	Canberra Cannons	139–135	Newcastle Falcons	AIS Arena	N/A	boxscore
9/05/1992	Hobart Tassie Devils	112–106	Adelaide 36ers	Derwent Entertainment Centre	N/A	boxscore
9/05/1992	Geelong Supercats	112–121	North Melbourne Giants	Geelong Arena	N/A	boxscore
10/05/1992	Melbourne Tigers	112–87	Sydney Kings	Melbourne Park	N/A	boxscore

=== Round 7 ===
Date	Home	Score	Away	Venue	Crowd	Boxscore
15/05/1992	Hobart Tassie Devils	102–96	Illawarra Hawks	Derwent Entertainment Centre	N/A	boxscore
15/05/1992	Gold Coast Rollers	109–102	Geelong Supercats	Carrara Indoor Stadium	N/A	boxscore
16/05/1992	North Melbourne Giants	111–107	Canberra Cannons	Melbourne Sports and Entertainment Centre	N/A	boxscore
16/05/1992	Adelaide 36ers	102–116	South East Melbourne Magic	Adelaide Arena	N/A	boxscore
16/05/1992	Sydney Kings	94–89	Perth Wildcats	Sydney Entertainment Centre	N/A	boxscore
16/05/1992	Brisbane Bullets	121–113	Newcastle Falcons	Brisbane Entertainment Centre	N/A	boxscore
17/05/1992	Melbourne Tigers	113–106	Illawarra Hawks	Melbourne Park	N/A	boxscore

=== Round 8 ===
Date	Home	Score	Away	Venue	Crowd	Boxscore
22/05/1992	Adelaide 36ers	103–87	Illawarra Hawks	Adelaide Arena	N/A	boxscore
23/05/1992	Newcastle Falcons	111–113	Gold Coast Rollers	Newcastle Entertainment Centre	N/A	boxscore
23/05/1992	Sydney Kings	116–117	Brisbane Bullets	Sydney Entertainment Centre	N/A	boxscore
23/05/1992	Geelong Supercats	93–113	Illawarra Hawks	Geelong Arena	N/A	boxscore
23/05/1992	North Melbourne Giants	129–121	Melbourne Tigers	Melbourne Sports and Entertainment Centre	N/A	boxscore
23/05/1992	Canberra Cannons	109–98	Hobart Tassie Devils	AIS Arena	N/A	boxscore
24/05/1992	South East Melbourne Magic	116–99	Melbourne Tigers	Melbourne Park	N/A	boxscore

=== Round 9 ===
Date	Home	Score	Away	Venue	Crowd	Boxscore
29/05/1992	Canberra Cannons	101–76	Gold Coast Rollers	AIS Arena	N/A	boxscore
29/05/1992	Adelaide 36ers	98–100	Brisbane Bullets	Adelaide Arena	N/A	boxscore
30/05/1992	Perth Wildcats	93–96	North Melbourne Giants	Perth Entertainment Centre	N/A	boxscore
30/05/1992	Sydney Kings	96–82	South East Melbourne Magic	Sydney Entertainment Centre	N/A	boxscore
30/05/1992	Illawarra Hawks	105–99	Gold Coast Rollers	Beaton Park Stadium	N/A	boxscore
30/05/1992	Hobart Tassie Devils	103–110	Melbourne Tigers	Derwent Entertainment Centre	N/A	boxscore
30/05/1992	Newcastle Falcons	127–109	Geelong Supercats	Newcastle Entertainment Centre	N/A	boxscore

=== Round 10 ===
Date	Home	Score	Away	Venue	Crowd	Boxscore
5/06/1992	Illawarra Hawks	104–95	Perth Wildcats	Beaton Park Stadium	N/A	boxscore
5/06/1992	Hobart Tassie Devils	115–103	Brisbane Bullets	Derwent Entertainment Centre	N/A	boxscore
6/06/1992	Adelaide 36ers	106–94	Gold Coast Rollers	Adelaide Arena	N/A	boxscore
6/06/1992	Newcastle Falcons	99–113	South East Melbourne Magic	Newcastle Entertainment Centre	N/A	boxscore
6/06/1992	Canberra Cannons	99–101	Sydney Kings	AIS Arena	N/A	boxscore
6/06/1992	Melbourne Tigers	124–102	Brisbane Bullets	Melbourne Park	N/A	boxscore

=== Round 11 ===
Date	Home	Score	Away	Venue	Crowd	Boxscore
12/06/1992	Gold Coast Rollers	96–114	South East Melbourne Magic	Carrara Indoor Stadium	N/A	boxscore
12/06/1992	Melbourne Tigers	118–103	North Melbourne Giants	Melbourne Park	N/A	boxscore
13/06/1992	Perth Wildcats	92–95	Adelaide 36ers	Perth Entertainment Centre	N/A	boxscore
13/06/1992	Brisbane Bullets	104–125	South East Melbourne Magic	Brisbane Entertainment Centre	N/A	boxscore
13/06/1992	Sydney Kings	134–102	Newcastle Falcons	Sydney Entertainment Centre	N/A	boxscore
13/06/1992	Canberra Cannons	137–79	Geelong Supercats	AIS Arena	N/A	boxscore
13/06/1992	Hobart Tassie Devils	98–122	North Melbourne Giants	Derwent Entertainment Centre	N/A	boxscore

=== Round 12 ===
Date	Home	Score	Away	Venue	Crowd	Boxscore
19/06/1992	Newcastle Falcons	107–116	Brisbane Bullets	Newcastle Entertainment Centre	N/A	boxscore
19/06/1992	North Melbourne Giants	122–124	Sydney Kings	Melbourne Sports and Entertainment Centre	N/A	boxscore
19/06/1992	Illawarra Hawks	119–93	Geelong Supercats	Beaton Park Stadium	N/A	boxscore
20/06/1992	Gold Coast Rollers	93–107	Brisbane Bullets	Carrara Indoor Stadium	N/A	boxscore
20/06/1992	Canberra Cannons	102–95	Perth Wildcats	AIS Arena	N/A	boxscore
20/06/1992	South East Melbourne Magic	98–90	Sydney Kings	Melbourne Park	N/A	boxscore
21/06/1992	Melbourne Tigers	106–109	Adelaide 36ers	Melbourne Park	N/A	boxscore

=== Round 13 ===
Date	Home	Score	Away	Venue	Crowd	Boxscore
26/06/1992	Illawarra Hawks	95–88	Hobart Tassie Devils	Beaton Park Stadium	N/A	boxscore
26/06/1992	North Melbourne Giants	121–110	Brisbane Bullets	Melbourne Sports and Entertainment Centre	N/A	boxscore
27/06/1992	Perth Wildcats	114–106	Melbourne Tigers	Perth Entertainment Centre	N/A	boxscore
27/06/1992	Gold Coast Rollers	92–91	Adelaide 36ers	Carrara Indoor Stadium	N/A	boxscore
27/06/1992	Newcastle Falcons	107–118	Hobart Tassie Devils	Newcastle Entertainment Centre	N/A	boxscore
27/06/1992	South East Melbourne Magic	106–91	Brisbane Bullets	Melbourne Park	N/A	boxscore
27/06/1992	Geelong Supercats	103–105	Sydney Kings	Geelong Arena	N/A	boxscore
30/06/1992	South East Melbourne Magic	99–92	Canberra Cannons	Melbourne Park	N/A	boxscore

=== Round 14 ===
Date	Home	Score	Away	Venue	Crowd	Boxscore
10/07/1992	Canberra Cannons	114–92	Adelaide 36ers	AIS Arena	N/A	boxscore
10/07/1992	North Melbourne Giants	119–111	Newcastle Falcons	Melbourne Sports and Entertainment Centre	N/A	boxscore
11/07/1992	Brisbane Bullets	86–122	Adelaide 36ers	Brisbane Entertainment Centre	N/A	boxscore
11/07/1992	Sydney Kings	85–91	Illawarra Hawks	Sydney Entertainment Centre	N/A	boxscore
11/07/1992	Hobart Tassie Devils	106–81	Gold Coast Rollers	Derwent Entertainment Centre	N/A	boxscore
11/07/1992	Geelong Supercats	96–132	Perth Wildcats	Geelong Arena	N/A	boxscore
12/07/1992	Melbourne Tigers	107–115	Gold Coast Rollers	Melbourne Park	N/A	boxscore
14/07/1992	South East Melbourne Magic	111–93	Newcastle Falcons	Melbourne Park	N/A	boxscore

=== Round 15 ===
Date	Home	Score	Away	Venue	Crowd	Boxscore
17/07/1992	Adelaide 36ers	125–111	Geelong Supercats	Adelaide Arena	N/A	boxscore
17/07/1992	Melbourne Tigers	113–118	Newcastle Falcons	Melbourne Park	N/A	boxscore
18/07/1992	Perth Wildcats	101–97	Gold Coast Rollers	Perth Entertainment Centre	N/A	boxscore
18/07/1992	Brisbane Bullets	97–95	Canberra Cannons	Brisbane Entertainment Centre	N/A	boxscore
18/07/1992	Illawarra Hawks	103–125	Sydney Kings	Beaton Park Stadium	N/A	boxscore
18/07/1992	Hobart Tassie Devils	110–89	Newcastle Falcons	Derwent Entertainment Centre	N/A	boxscore
18/07/1992	South East Melbourne Magic	93–85	North Melbourne Giants	Melbourne Park	N/A	boxscore

=== Round 16 ===
Date	Home	Score	Away	Venue	Crowd	Boxscore
14/08/1992	Newcastle Falcons	119–124	Perth Wildcats	Newcastle Entertainment Centre	N/A	boxscore
14/08/1992	Illawarra Hawks	106–113	Melbourne Tigers	Beaton Park Stadium	N/A	boxscore
15/08/1992	Adelaide 36ers	96–98	Sydney Kings	Adelaide Arena	N/A	boxscore
15/08/1992	Gold Coast Rollers	91–77	Perth Wildcats	Carrara Indoor Stadium	N/A	boxscore
15/08/1992	Canberra Cannons	120–130	North Melbourne Giants	AIS Arena	N/A	boxscore
15/08/1992	Hobart Tassie Devils	103–108	South East Melbourne Magic	Derwent Entertainment Centre	N/A	boxscore
15/08/1992	Geelong Supercats	113–128	Brisbane Bullets	Geelong Arena	N/A	boxscore

=== Round 17 ===
Date	Home	Score	Away	Venue	Crowd	Boxscore
21/08/1992	Illawarra Hawks	98–96	Adelaide 36ers	Beaton Park Stadium	N/A	boxscore
21/08/1992	North Melbourne Giants	114–94	Gold Coast Rollers	Melbourne Sports and Entertainment Centre	N/A	boxscore
21/08/1992	Geelong Supercats	118–125	Newcastle Falcons	Geelong Arena	N/A	boxscore
22/08/1992	Brisbane Bullets	110–121	Perth Wildcats	Brisbane Entertainment Centre	N/A	boxscore
22/08/1992	Canberra Cannons	109–112	Melbourne Tigers	AIS Arena	N/A	boxscore
22/08/1992	South East Melbourne Magic	93–76	Gold Coast Rollers	Melbourne Park	N/A	boxscore
22/08/1992	Hobart Tassie Devils	97–111	Sydney Kings	Derwent Entertainment Centre	N/A	boxscore

=== Round 18 ===
Date	Home	Score	Away	Venue	Crowd	Boxscore
28/08/1992	Adelaide 36ers	89–73	Hobart Tassie Devils	Adelaide Arena	N/A	boxscore
28/08/1992	Newcastle Falcons	96–109	Canberra Cannons	Newcastle Entertainment Centre	N/A	boxscore
28/08/1992	Illawarra Hawks	113–95	North Melbourne Giants	Beaton Park Stadium	N/A	boxscore
28/08/1992	Geelong Supercats	98–139	South East Melbourne Magic	Geelong Arena	N/A	boxscore
29/08/1992	Perth Wildcats	120–104	Hobart Tassie Devils	Perth Entertainment Centre	N/A	boxscore
29/08/1992	Gold Coast Rollers	92–95	Canberra Cannons	Carrara Indoor Stadium	N/A	boxscore
29/08/1992	Sydney Kings	114–113	North Melbourne Giants	Sydney Entertainment Centre	N/A	boxscore
31/08/1992	Melbourne Tigers	108–99	South East Melbourne Magic	Melbourne Park	N/A	boxscore

=== Round 19 ===
Date	Home	Score	Away	Venue	Crowd	Boxscore
4/09/1992	Adelaide 36ers	81–82	Canberra Cannons	Adelaide Arena	N/A	boxscore
4/09/1992	Gold Coast Rollers	94–88	Illawarra Hawks	Carrara Indoor Stadium	N/A	boxscore
4/09/1992	South East Melbourne Magic	97–91	Geelong Supercats	Melbourne Park	N/A	boxscore
5/09/1992	Perth Wildcats	116–102	Canberra Cannons	Perth Entertainment Centre	N/A	boxscore
5/09/1992	Newcastle Falcons	106–96	Illawarra Hawks	Newcastle Entertainment Centre	N/A	boxscore
5/09/1992	Brisbane Bullets	113–110	Sydney Kings	Brisbane Entertainment Centre	N/A	boxscore
5/09/1992	North Melbourne Giants	137–113	Geelong Supercats	Melbourne Sports and Entertainment Centre	N/A	boxscore
6/09/1992	Melbourne Tigers	117–107	Hobart Tassie Devils	Melbourne Park	N/A	boxscore

=== Round 20 ===
Date	Home	Score	Away	Venue	Crowd	Boxscore
11/09/1992	Newcastle Falcons	138–124	Melbourne Tigers	Newcastle Entertainment Centre	N/A	boxscore
11/09/1992	North Melbourne Giants	119–109	Perth Wildcats	Melbourne Sports and Entertainment Centre	N/A	boxscore
12/09/1992	Brisbane Bullets	100–117	Illawarra Hawks	Brisbane Entertainment Centre	N/A	boxscore
12/09/1992	Sydney Kings	124–120	Melbourne Tigers	Sydney Entertainment Centre	N/A	boxscore
12/09/1992	South East Melbourne Magic	112–100	Perth Wildcats	Melbourne Park	N/A	boxscore
12/09/1992	Geelong Supercats	99–115	Adelaide 36ers	Geelong Arena	N/A	boxscore
12/09/1992	Gold Coast Rollers	90–100	Hobart Tassie Devils	Carrara Indoor Stadium	N/A	boxscore

=== Round 21 ===
Date	Home	Score	Away	Venue	Crowd	Boxscore
18/09/1992	Adelaide 36ers	108–89	Newcastle Falcons	Adelaide Arena	N/A	boxscore
18/09/1992	Geelong Supercats	106–104	Gold Coast Rollers	Geelong Arena	N/A	boxscore
19/09/1992	Perth Wildcats	123–106	Newcastle Falcons	Perth Entertainment Centre	N/A	boxscore
19/09/1992	Brisbane Bullets	125–112	North Melbourne Giants	Brisbane Entertainment Centre	N/A	boxscore
19/09/1992	Sydney Kings	98–89	Hobart Tassie Devils	Sydney Entertainment Centre	N/A	boxscore
19/09/1992	Canberra Cannons	106–112	Illawarra Hawks	AIS Arena	N/A	boxscore

=== Round 22 ===
Date	Home	Score	Away	Venue	Crowd	Boxscore
23/09/1992	Melbourne Tigers	119–103	Geelong Supercats	Melbourne Park	N/A	boxscore
25/09/1992	Gold Coast Rollers	107–103	Sydney Kings	Carrara Indoor Stadium	N/A	boxscore
25/09/1992	Illawarra Hawks	108–98	South East Melbourne Magic	Beaton Park Stadium	N/A	boxscore
25/09/1992	North Melbourne Giants	130–134	Adelaide 36ers	Melbourne Sports and Entertainment Centre	N/A	boxscore
26/09/1992	Perth Wildcats	108–115	Brisbane Bullets	Perth Entertainment Centre	N/A	boxscore
26/09/1992	Newcastle Falcons	115–104	Sydney Kings	Newcastle Entertainment Centre	N/A	boxscore
26/09/1992	Canberra Cannons	89–98	South East Melbourne Magic	AIS Arena	N/A	boxscore
26/09/1992	Hobart Tassie Devils	116–97	Geelong Supercats	Derwent Entertainment Centre	N/A	boxscore

== Ladder ==
This is the ladder at the end of season, before the finals. The top 8 teams qualified for the finals series.

Pos	1992 NBL season											
Pos	Team	Pld	W	L	PCT	Last 5	Streak	Home	Away	PF	PA	PP
1	S.E. Melbourne Magic	24	20	4	83.33%	3–2	W1	12–0	8–4	2511	2289	109.70%
2	Sydney Kings	24	17	7	70.83%	2–3	L2	10–2	7–5	2540	2434	104.35%
3	Melbourne Tigers	24	15	9	62.50%	3–2	W1	9–3	6–6	2745	2638	104.06%
4	North Melbourne Giants	24	14	10	58.33%	2–3	L2	10–2	4–8	2709	2621	103.36%
5	Illawarra Hawks	24	13	11	54.17%	3–2	W3	9–3	4–8	2451	2423	101.16%
6	Perth Wildcats^{1}	24	12	12	50.00%	2–3	L1	7–5	5–7	2468	2429	101.61%
7	Brisbane Bullets^{1}	24	12	12	50.00%	3–2	W2	6–6	6–6	2645	2722	97.17%
8	Canberra Cannons^{2}	24	11	13	45.83%	2–3	L3	7–5	4–8	2525	2474	102.06%
9	Adelaide 36ers^{2}	24	11	13	45.83%	4–1	W3	6–6	5–7	2468	2388	103.35%
10	Gold Coast Rollers^{2}	24	11	13	45.83%	2–3	W1	8–4	3–9	2353	2444	96.28%
11	Hobart Tassie Devils^{3}	24	9	15	37.50%	2–3	W1	7–5	2–10	2463	2535	97.16%
12	Newcastle Falcons^{3}	24	9	15	37.50%	3–2	W1	6–6	3–9	2652	2759	96.12%
13	Geelong Supercats	24	2	22	8.33%	1–4	L2	2–10	0–12	2525	2899	87.10%

Updated to match(es) played on 26 September 1992. Source: NBL.com.au

The NBL tie-breaker system as outlined in the NBL Rules and Regulations states that in the case of an identical win–loss record, the results in games played between the teams will determine order of seeding.

^{1}Head-to-Head between Perth Wildcats and Brisbane Bullets (1-1). Perth Wildcats won For and Against (+4).

^{2}3-way Head-to-Head between Canberra Cannons (4-0), Adelaide 36ers (1-3) and Gold Coast Rollers (1-3).

^{3}Head-to-Head between Adelaide 36ers and Gold Coast Rollers (1-1). Adelaide 36ers won For and Against (+11).

^{4}Hobart Tassie Devils won Head-to-Head (2-0).

== Finals ==
There were four quarterfinals, two semifinals, and then best of three grand final series.

=== Playoff bracket ===
Quarterfinals
1	S.E. Melbourne Magic	91	101	X
8	Canberra Cannons	89	96	X
4	North Melbourne Giants	118	123	X
5	Illawarra Hawks	98	104	X
3	Melbourne Tigers	103	95	116
6	Perth Wildcats	111	94	100
2	Sydney Kings	100	130	X
7	Brisbane Bullets	91	123	X

Semifinals
1	S.E. Melbourne Magic	112	127	X
4	North Melbourne Giants	86	106	X
2	Sydney Kings	112	124	95
3	Melbourne Tigers	122	118	101

Grand Final
1	S.E. Melbourne Magic	98	115	95
3	Melbourne Tigers	116	93	88

=== Quarter-finals ===
Date	Home	Score	Away	Venue	Crowd	Boxscore
28/09/1992	Sydney Kings	100–91	Brisbane Bullets	Sydney Entertainment Centre	N/A	boxscore
29/09/1992	Illawarra Hawks	98–118	North Melbourne Giants	Beaton Park Stadium	N/A	boxscore
30/09/1992	Canberra Cannons	89–91	South East Melbourne Magic	AIS Arena	N/A	boxscore
2/10/1992	Perth Wildcats	111–103	Melbourne Tigers	Perth Entertainment Centre	N/A	boxscore
2/10/1992	South East Melbourne Magic	101–96	Canberra Cannons	Melbourne Park	N/A	boxscore
3/10/1992	North Melbourne Giants	123–104	Illawarra Hawks	Melbourne Sports and Entertainment Centre	N/A	boxscore
3/10/1992	Brisbane Bullets	123–130	Sydney Kings	Brisbane Entertainment Centre	N/A	boxscore
5/10/1992	Melbourne Tigers	95–94	Perth Wildcats	Melbourne Park	N/A	boxscore
7/10/1992	Melbourne Tigers	116–100	Perth Wildcats	Melbourne Park	N/A	boxscore

=== Semi-finals ===
Date	Home	Score	Away	Venue	Crowd	Boxscore
9/10/1992	North Melbourne Giants	86–112	South East Melbourne Magic	Melbourne Park	N/A	boxscore
10/10/1992	Melbourne Tigers	122–112	Sydney Kings	Melbourne Park	N/A	boxscore
16/10/1992	Sydney Kings	124–118	Melbourne Tigers	Sydney Entertainment Centre	N/A	boxscore
17/10/1992	South East Melbourne Magic	127–106	North Melbourne Giants	Melbourne Park	N/A	boxscore
18/10/1992	Sydney Kings	95–101	Melbourne Tigers	Sydney Entertainment Centre	N/A	boxscore

=== Grand Final ===
Date	Home	Score	Away	Venue	Crowd	Boxscore
24/10/1992	Melbourne Tigers	116–98	South East Melbourne Magic	Melbourne Park	15,049	boxscore
30/10/1992	South East Melbourne Magic	115–93	Melbourne Tigers	Melbourne Park	15,034	boxscore
1/11/1992	South East Melbourne Magic	95–88	Melbourne Tigers	Melbourne Park	N/A	boxscore

== 1992 NBL statistics leaders ==
Category	Player	Team	Stat
Points per game	Andrew Gaze	Melbourne Tigers	33.8
Rebounds per game	Mark Bradtke	Adelaide 36ers	14.8
Assists per game	Andre Lafleur	Gold Coast Rollers	9.6
Steals per game	Chris Harris	Geelong Supercats	3.3
Blocks per game	John Dorge	South East Melbourne Magic	2.9
Free throw percentage	Andrew Gaze	Melbourne Tigers	86.5%

== NBL awards ==
- Most Valuable Player: Scott Fisher, North Melbourne Giants & Andrew Gaze, Melbourne Tigers
- Most Valuable Player Grand Final: Bruce Bolden, South East Melbourne Magic
- Best Defensive Player: Terry Dozier, Newcastle Falcons
- Most Improved Player: Andrew Svaldenis, Hobart Tassie Devils
- Rookie of the Year: Lachlan Armfield, Canberra Cannons
- Coach of the Year: Brian Goorjian, South East Melbourne Magic

== All NBL Team ==
#	Player	Team
PG	Doug Overton	Illawarra Hawks
SG	Dwayne McClain	Sydney Kings
SF	Andrew Gaze	Melbourne Tigers
PF	Andrew Vlahov	Perth Wildcats
C	Scott Fisher	North Melbourne Giants
