= South East Melbourne Magic =

Defunct basketball team from Melbourne, Australia

S.E. Melbourne Magic
- Leagues: NBL
- Founded: 1992
- Dissolved: 1998
- History: South East Melbourne Magic; 1992–1998
- Arena: Rod Laver Arena
- Capacity: 15,400
- Location: Melbourne, Victoria
- Team colors: Black, White, Red, and Blue
- Championships: 2 (1992, 1996)

The South East Melbourne Magic was an Australian basketball team based in Melbourne. The Magic competed in the National Basketball League (NBL) between 1992 and 1998, and played their home games at Rod Laver Arena.

The Magic were established in 1992 following the amalgamation of the Eastside Spectres and Southern Melbourne Saints. In their seven seasons, the Magic contested four NBL Grand Finals and won two championships, their first coming in their debut season and their second coming in 1996. Following their loss in the 1998 Grand Final to the Adelaide 36ers, the Magic merged with the North Melbourne Giants to become the Victoria Titans for the 1998–99 NBL season.

== Honour roll ==
NBL Championships:	2 (1992, 1996)
NBL finals appearances:	7 (1992, 1993, 1994, 1995, 1996, 1997, 1998)
NBL Grand Final appearances:	4 (1992, 1996, 1997, 1998)
NBL Most Valuable Player:	Robert Rose (1993)
NBL Grand Final MVP:	Bruce Bolden (1992), Mike Kelly (1996)
NBL All-Star Game MVP:	Tony Ronaldson (1994)
All-NBL First Team:	Robert Rose (1993), John Dorge (1995)
All-NBL Second Team:	Bruce Bolden (1992, 1993), Tony Ronaldson (1994, 1996)
All-NBL Third Team:	Robert Rose (1992), Adonis Jordan (1995)
NBL Coach of the Year:	Brian Goorjian (1992, 1997, 1998)
NBL Rookie of the Year:	Sam Mackinnon (1994)
NBL Most Improved Player:	Chris Anstey (1996)
NBL Best Defensive Player:	Darren Lucas (1994, 1995), Mike Kelly (1997, 1998)
NBL Best Sixth Man:	Jason Smith (1998)

== Season by season ==
NBL champions	League champions	Runners-up	Finals berth

Season	Tier	League	Regular season					Post-season	Head coach
Season	Tier	League	Finish	Played	Wins	Losses	Win %	Post-season	Head coach
S.E. Melbourne Magic
1992	1	NBL	1st	24	20	4	.833	Won quarterfinals (Canberra) 2–0; Won semifinals (North Melbourne) 2–0; Won NBL finals (Melbourne) 2–1	Brian Goorjian
1993	1	NBL	2nd	26	20	6	.769	Won quarterfinals (Adelaide) 2–0; Lost semifinals (Melbourne) 0–2	Brian Goorjian
1994	1	NBL	3rd	26	18	8	.692	Won quarterfinals (Perth) 2–0; Lost semifinals (North Melbourne) 0–2	Brian Goorjian
1995	1	NBL	2nd	26	18	8	.692	Won quarterfinals (Illawarra) 2–1; Lost semifinals (North Melbourne) 1–2	Brian Goorjian
1996	1	NBL	2nd	26	19	7	.731	Won quarterfinals (North Melbourne) 2–0; Won semifinals (Adelaide) 2–0; Won NBL finals (Melbourne) 2–1	Brian Goorjian
1997	1	NBL	1st	30	22	8	.733	Won semifinals (Perth) 2–0; Lost NBL finals (Melbourne) 1–2	Brian Goorjian
1998	1	NBL	1st	30	26	4	.867	Won semifinals (Brisbane) 2–0; Lost NBL finals (Adelaide) 0–2	Brian Goorjian
Regular season record				188	143	45	.761	3 regular season champions	
Finals record				37	24	13	.649	2 NBL championships	

As of the end of the 1998 season

Source: South East Melbourne Magic Year by Year
