= Gold Coast Rollers (NBL) =

Defunct basketball team from Gold Coast, Australia

- Leagues: NBL
- Founded: 1990
- Dissolved: 1996
- History: Gold Coast Cougars; 1990; Gold Coast Rollers; 1991–1996
- Arena: Carrara Indoor Stadium
- Capacity: 2,992
- Location: Gold Coast, Queensland
- Team colors: Green, blue, white
- Championships: 0
| Home | Away |

The Gold Coast Rollers are a defunct basketball team from Gold Coast, Queensland, that competed in the National Basketball League (NBL).

== History ==
=== Entering the NBL ===
The Gold Coast Cougars entered the NBL in 1990 following strong performances in the Queensland State League, having won the 1987 and 1988 titles. A syndicate led by John Mizzulo successfully secured the NBL licence and undertook redevelopment of a new stadium for the team. The club appointed Australian Institute of Sport Deputy Chairman Ron Harvey as General Manager. Construction of the temporary 4,000-seat stadium was delayed by weather and financial issues, and was completed less than two weeks before the season began. The inaugural squad featured five former Brisbane Bullets players, including Larry Sengstock and Ron Radliff as well as former NBA player Leroy Combs. In their first NBL season, Gold Coast finished 11th with a 9–17 record.

=== 1991 New Ownership and Name change ===
At the start of 1991, Gold Coast Cougars owner John Minuzzo faced significant financial difficulties, reportedly carrying debts of around $1 billion. Due to these liquidity problems, the NBL board terminated the Cougars' licence on 5 March. Despite the termination, the team was permitted to compete in the pre-season K-Mart Classic while efforts to secure new ownership continued. NBL officials Bill Palmer and Terry Ryan led the search for buyers, and on the eve of the 23 March deadline, a consortium of 13 individuals representing Gold Coast basketball and business interests submitted a successful bid. However, Minuzzo retained the rights to the names "Gold Coast Cougars" and "Gold Coast Breakers", necessitating a new club identity. With the season imminent and branding unresolved, the new ownership adopted the name "Gold Coast Rollers" and selected green, blue, and white as the team's colours in the final week before the season commenced.

=== 1996 removal ===
The Rollers had their NBL licence revoked following the 1996 season due to financial difficulties.

== Honour roll ==
| NBL Championships: | None |
| NBL Finals Appearances: | None |
| NBL Grand Final Appearances: | None |
| NBL Most Valuable Players: | None |
| NBL Grand Final MVPs: | None |
| All-NBL First Team: | Mike Mitchell (1991) |
| All-NBL Second Team: | Andre Lafleur (1992, 1993) |
| NBL Coach of the Year: | None |
| NBL Rookie of the Year: | None |
| NBL Most Improved Player: | None |
| NBL Best Defensive Player: | None |
| NBL Best Sixth Man: | None |
| NBL Good Hands Award: | Andre LaFleur (1991, 1992, 1993) |

== Season by season ==
| NBL champions | League champions | Runners-up | Finals berth |

| Season | Tier | League | Regular season | | | | | Post-season | Head coach | Captain | Club MVP |
| Season | Tier | League | Finish | Played | Wins | Losses | Win % | Post-season | Head coach | Captain | Club MVP |
|---|---|---|---|---|---|---|---|---|---|---|---|
Gold Coast Cougars
| 1990 | 1 | NBL | 11th | 26 | 9 | 17 | .346 | Did not qualify | Thomas Wisman; Brian Lester | Larry Sengstock | Leroy Combs |
Gold Coast Rollers
| 1991 | 1 | NBL | 8th | 26 | 14 | 12 | .538 | Did not qualify | David Claxton | Larry Sengstock | Mike Mitchell |
| 1992 | 1 | NBL | 10th | 24 | 11 | 13 | .458 | Did not qualify | David Claxton | Larry Sengstock | Andre Lafleur |
| 1993 | 1 | NBL | 10th | 26 | 12 | 14 | .462 | Did not qualify | David Claxton | Mike Mitchell | Andre Lafleur |
| 1994 | 1 | NBL | 10th | 26 | 10 | 16 | .385 | Did not qualify | David Claxton | Mike Mitchell | Mike Mitchell |
| 1995 | 1 | NBL | 13th | 26 | 5 | 21 | .417 | Did not qualify | David Claxton | Peter Harvey | Steve Woodberry |
| 1996 | 1 | NBL | 14th | 26 | 6 | 20 | .231 | Did not qualify | David Claxton | Peter Harvey | Tony De Ambrosis |
| Regular season record | | | | | 180 | 67 | 113 | .372 | 0 regular season champions | | |
| Finals record | | | | | 0 | 0 | 0 | .000 | 0 NBL championships | | |

As of the end of the 1996 season
