= North Melbourne Giants =

Defunct basketball team from Melbourne, Australia

- Leagues: NBL
- Founded: 1980
- Dissolved: 1998
- History: Coburg Giants; 1980–1986; North Melbourne Giants; 1987–1998
- Arena: The Glass House
- Capacity: 7,200
- Location: Melbourne, Victoria
- Team colors: Teal and White; originally Maroon, Gold, Silver and White
- Championships: 2 (1989, 1994)
Home	Away

The North Melbourne Giants, previously known as the Coburg Giants, were an Australian professional basketball team based in Melbourne. The Giants competed in the National Basketball League (NBL) between 1980 and 1998, and played their home games at The Glass House.

The Coburg Giants entered the league in its second season (1980) and would change their name to the North Melbourne Giants in 1987. Under their new name, the Giants had much success, winning two championships, only to dissolve in 1998 to ultimately become a domestic association.

== Honour roll ==
NBL Championships:	2 (1989, 1994)
NBL finals appearances:	9 (1982, 1983, 1984, 1987, 1988, 1989, 1990, 1994, 1995)
NBL Grand Final appearances:	4 (1988, 1989, 1994, 1995)
NBL Most Valuable Player:	Ray Borner (1985), Scott Fisher (1989, 1992)
NBL Grand Final MVP:	Scott Fisher (1989), Paul Rees (1994)
NBL All-Star Game MVP:	Darryl McDonald (1996)
All-NBL First Team:	Ray Borner (1985), Jim Foster (1986), Tim Dillon (1988), Scott Fisher (1989, 1990, 1991, 1992), Darryl McDonald (1994, 1995, 1996)
All-NBL Second Team:	Scott Fisher (1987, 1988), Joe Hillman (1990), Darryl McDonald (1997)
All-NBL Third Team:	Pat Reidy (1994, 1995), Chris Jent (1995)
NBL Coach of the Year:	Bruce Palmer (1988), Brett Brown (1994)
NBL Rookie of the Year:	David Smith (1998)
NBL Most Improved Player:	None
NBL Best Defensive Player:	None
NBL Best Sixth Man:	None
NBL Good Hands Award:	Darryl McDonald (1994, 1995, 1996, 1997)

== Season by season ==
NBL champions	League champions	Runners-up	Finals berth

Season	Tier	League	Regular season					Post-season	Head coach
Season	Tier	League	Finish	Played	Wins	Losses	Win %	Post-season	Head coach
Coburg Giants
1980	1	NBL	9th	22	7	15	.318	Did not qualify	Ray Tomlinson
1981	1	NBL	10th	22	7	15	.318	Did not qualify	Ray Tomlinson
1982	1	NBL	4th	26	18	8	.692	Lost semifinal (West Adelaide) 74–94	Bruce Palmer
1983	1	NBL	3rd	22	13	9	.591	Qualified round robin 2–1; Lost semifinal (Canberra) 75–80	Ray Tomlinson
1984	1	NBL	2nd	24	18	6	.750	Lost preliminary final (Brisbane) 104–105; Won qualifying final (Newcastle) 132–109; Lost semifinal (Canberra) 107–108	Owen Hughan
1985	1	NBL	5th	26	18	8	.692	Lost elimination final (Canberra) 87–110	Owen Hughan
1986	1	NBL	8th	26	14	12	.538	Did not qualify	Les Riddle
North Melbourne Giants
1987	1	NBL	6th	26	15	11	.577	Lost elimination final (Illawarra) 97–105	Bruce Palmer
1988	1	NBL	2nd	24	18	6	.750	Won semifinals (Perth) 2–1; Lost NBL finals (Canberra) 1–2	Bruce Palmer
1989	1	NBL	2nd	24	17	7	.708	Won semifinals (Perth) 2–1; Won NBL finals (Canberra) 2–0	Bruce Palmer
1990	1	NBL	1st	26	20	6	.769	Lost semifinals (Perth) 1–2	Bruce Palmer
1991	1	NBL	6th	26	16	10	.615	Won elimination finals (Geelong) 2–1; Lost semifinals (Eastside) 0–2	Bruce Palmer
1992	1	NBL	4th	24	14	10	.583	Won quarterfinals (Illawarra) 2–0; Lost semifinals (S.E. Melbourne) 0–2	Bruce Palmer
1993	1	NBL	8th	26	13	13	.500	Lost quarterfinals (Perth) 1–2	Brett Brown
1994	1	NBL	2nd	26	19	7	.731	Won quarterfinals (Sydney) 2–1; Won semifinals (S.E. Melbourne) 2–0; Won NBL finals (Adelaide) 2–0	Brett Brown
1995	1	NBL	3rd	26	18	8	.643	Won quarterfinals (Brisbane) 2–0; Won semifinals (S.E. Melbourne) 2–1; Lost NBL finals (Perth) 1–2	Brett Brown
1996	1	NBL	7th	26	15	11	.577	Lost quarterfinals (S.E. Melbourne) 0–2	Brett Brown
1997	1	NBL	3rd	30	18	12	.600	Won elimination finals (Canberra) 2–1; Lost semifinals (Melbourne) 0–2	Brett Brown
1998	1	NBL	10th	30	9	21	.300	Did not qualify	Brett Brown
Regular season record				482	287	195	.595	1 regular season champions	
Finals record				58	29	29	.500	2 NBL championships	

As of the end of the 1998 season

*Note: In 1983 and 1984, the NBL was split into Eastern and Western divisions during the regular season.

Source: North Melbourne Giants Year by Year
