= Keith Nelson (basketball) =

American former basketball player (born 1969)

Personal information
- Born: December 12, 1969 (age 56)
- Listed height: 200 cm (6 ft 7 in)
- Listed weight: 100 kg (220 lb)

Career information
- High school: Waggener (Louisville, Kentucky)
- College: Sullivan College (1988–1990); Chattanooga (1990–1992)
- NBA draft: 1992: undrafted
- Position: Forward / center
- Number: 8, 13

Career history
- 1993: KR
- 1994: Hobart Devils

Career highlights
- NBL blocks leader (1994); Icelandic All-Star game (1993); SoCon co-Player of the Year (1992); 2× First Team All-SoCon (1991, 1992)

Keith Nelson (born December 12, 1969) is an American former basketball player. He played for the Hobart Devils of the Australian NBL in 1994.

== College ==
After spending his first two seasons playing at a junior college, Nelson took his game to the University of Tennessee at Chattanooga (Chattanooga) in the fall of 1990. He spent two seasons playing at the Southern Conference school, an NCAA Division I institution. In just two seasons he scored 1,047 points, led the Mocs in scoring and rebounding both seasons, and was named the conference co-player of the year as a senior. Nelson, a center, was also a two-time First Team All-SoCon performer who guided Chattanooga to back-to-back co-SoCon regular season championships. His career 9.2 rebounds per game average is top all-time in school history. In 2004, the university inducted him into their athletics hall of fame.

== Professional career ==
In January 1993, Nelson signed with KR of the Icelandic Úrvalsdeild karla. Nicknamed the "Januaryman" by the press due to him being the fourth foreign player in four months for KR, he performed better than his predecessors and was named as a starter for the 1993 All-Star game. For the season, Nelson averaged 26.6 points and 15.7 rebounds in 11 games for the club.

He played for the Hobart Devils of the Australian NBL in 1994. For the season he averaged 21.6 games, 10.0 rebounds, and league leading 2.9 blocks per game.
