= Carrara Indoor Stadium =

Arena in Queensland, Australia

- Interactive map of Carrara Indoor Stadium
- Former names: Carrara Indoor Sports Centre
- Location: Broadbeach-Nerang Road, Carrara, Queensland
- Coordinates: 28°0′20″S 153°21′55″E
- Owner: Gold Coast City Council
- Operator: Gold Coast City Council
- Capacity: Basketball: 2,992
- Surface: Sprung wooden floor

Tenants
- Gold Coast Rollers (NBL) (1990–1996); Squash Australia (Headquarters) (2018–)

Carrara Indoor Stadium is a multi-purpose arena located at Carrara on Queensland's Gold Coast and can accommodate 1,600 fans, with additional seating provided if required, which can push the total capacity for events such as basketball up to 2,962. The stadium stands adjacent to the 25,000-seat Metricon Stadium and forms part of the Carrara Sports Complex. The stadium has the nickname The Greenhouse, as even during winter it would get "hot and steamy as Hades at times", although that changed with $800,000 worth of improvements in 1996, including new air conditioning.

The stadium was the home of the former National Basketball League team, the Gold Coast Rollers, who played there from 1990 until 1996, after which their licence was revoked due to financial struggles. The stadium later became the training venue for the NBL's Gold Coast Blaze, who played at the larger 5,269-seat Gold Coast Convention and Exhibition Centre until the team folded after the 2011–12 NBL season.

Carrara Indoor Stadium's flexible design means it is regularly used for sporting activities ranging from soccer and basketball to figure skating. The stadium has also been used to hold expos as well as special dinners and functions.

With the Gold Coast winning the right to host the 2018 Commonwealth Games, plans were put in place to develop a new indoor venue at Carrara under the name of Carrara Sport and Leisure Centre, which will replace the Carrara Indoor Stadium and is slated to host the badminton competition.

Squash Australia moved their headquarters to the Carrara Indoor Stadium in 2018.

== See also ==
- Gold Coast Sports Precinct
- Sports on the Gold Coast, Queensland
- Venues of the 2018 Commonwealth Games
