= Bruce Palmer (basketball) =

American-born Australian basketball coach

Personal information
- Born: November 12, 1955 (age 71) Los Angeles, California, U.S.
- Listed height: 6 ft 4 in (1.93 m)

Career information
- College: Pacific (1973–1977)
- NBA draft: 1977: undrafted
- Position: Guard

Career history

Playing
- 1982: Coburg Giants

Coaching
- 1982: Coburg Giants
- 1987–1992: North Melbourne Giants
- 1993–1995: Brisbane Bullets
- 2003: Hunter Pirates

Career highlights
- As coach: NBL champion (1989); NBL Coach of the Year (1988)

Bruce Allen Palmer (born November 12, 1955) is an American-born Australian professional basketball coach who coached primarily in the Australian National Basketball League (NBL).

Palmer began coaching in the NBL in 1987 with the North Melbourne Giants, after coaching the Dandenong Rangers in the VBA. In 1988 he was awarded NBL Coach of the Year though the Giants would lose the NBL Grand Final series to the Canberra Cannons. The following year, the Giants won the championship over the Cannons.

Palmer moved to the Brisbane Bullets in 1993, although he was unsuccessful in bringing the team the level of success he saw with the Giants. He left the team after three seasons and took a break from coaching in the NBL, during which he coached representative youth basketball. In 1998 he worked as an assistant coach with the Brisbane Bullets under head coach Brian Kerle.

Between 2000 and 2003, Palmer coached in Asia and the Middle East before returning to the NBL as head coach of the Hunter Pirates. Palmer was fired part way through the season in a controversial management decision.

He is the seventh winningest coach in NBL history, with a win–loss record of 184–104.

Since 2004, Palmer coached representative youth basketball as both head coach and assistant coach, including the Australian Under 20 men's team.

He was the head coach for the Brisbane Capitals in the Australian Basketball Association League.

== Head coaching record ==
Legend
Regular season	G	Games coached	W	Games won	L	Games lost	W–L %	Win–loss %
Playoffs	PG	Playoff games	PW	Playoff wins	PL	Playoff losses	PW–L %	Playoff win–loss %

Team	Year	G	W	L	W–L%	Finish	PG	PW	PL	PW–L%	Result
Link Tochigi Brex	2010-11	16	7	9	.438	6th in JBL	-	-	-	–	-
Link Tochigi Brex	2011-12	38	17	21	.447	Fired	-	-	-	–	-
