= 1986 Adelaide 36ers season =

- Head coach: Ken Cole
- Captain: Bill Jones
- Arena: Apollo Stadium

NBL results
- Record: 24–2 (92.3%)
- Ladder: 1st
- Finals finish: Champions
- Stats at NBL.com.au

The 1986 NBL season was the 5th season for the Adelaide 36ers in the Australian-based National Basketball League. The club won its first NBL Championship after defeating the Brisbane Bullets 2–1 in the NBL's first ever multiple game Grand Final series. In 1985, the 36ers just missed out on their first NBL championship when they had gone down 121–95 to the Brian Kerle coached, Leroy Loggins inspired Brisbane Bullets in the Grand Final that had been played on the Bullets home court, the Sleeman Sports Centre.

The Adelaide 36ers played their home games at the 3,000 seat Apollo Stadium. Built in 1969, the Apollo was (at the time) Adelaide's largest indoor arena. Coaching the 36ers as he had done in 1985 was former Australian Boomers Olympic Games representative (1964) Ken Cole. Captaining the team would be 6'9" (207 cm) American import centre, 27 year old Bill Jones.

The 1986 Adelaide 36ers compiled a league leading 24–2 record in the regular season before going 3–1 in the playoffs to claim their first title.

== Off-season ==
=== Additions ===
(From the squad at the end of the 1985 NBL season)

Player	Signed	Former Team
Dwayne Nelson		
Scott Ninnis		
Peter Sexton		
Mark Sykes		

=== Subtractions ===
(From the squad at the end of the 1985 NBL season)

Player	Reason Left	New Team
Andy Amberg		
Craig Clatworthy		
Karl Luke		

== Roster ==
Adelaide 36ers roster
Players
Coaches

Pos.	No.	Nat.	Name	Ht.	Wt.
SG	4	(Australia)	Pearce, Darryl	1.90 m (6 ft 3 in)	87 kg (192 lb)
SG	6	(Australia)	Ninnis, Scott	1.91 m (6 ft 3 in)	80 kg (176 lb)
SF	8	(Australia)	Ali, Peter	1.97 m (6 ft 6 in)	91 kg (201 lb)
PG	9	(Australia)	Wood, Ray	1.83 m (6 ft 0 in)	75 kg (165 lb)
G/F	10	(Australia)	McKay, Mike	1.95 m (6 ft 5 in)	92 kg (203 lb)
G/F	12	(Australia)	Sexton, Peter	1.98 m (6 ft 6 in)	94 kg (207 lb)
F	13	(Australia)	Sykes, Mark (DP)
C	14	(United States)	Jones, Bill (I/C)	2.09 m (6 ft 10 in)	90 kg (198 lb)
G	15	(Australia)	Green, Al	1.88 m (6 ft 2 in)	78 kg (172 lb)
F	20	(Australia)	Nelson, Dwayne	2.00 m (6 ft 7 in)	97 kg (214 lb)
G	32	(Australia)	Spear, David	1.87 m (6 ft 2 in)	81 kg (179 lb)
F/C	33	(United States)	Davis, Mark (I)	2.02 m (6 ft 8 in)	95 kg (209 lb)

Head coach

- (Australia) Ken Cole

Assistant coach(es)

- (Australia) Don Shipway

Legend

- (C) Team captain
- (I) Import player
- Injured

- Roster
Updated: 24 December 2016

=== Depth chart ===
Pos.	Starting 5	Bench 1	Bench 2
C	Bill Jones
PF	Mark Davis	Dwayne Nelson
SF	Peter Ali	Peter Sexton	Damien Fidge
SG	Darryl Pearce	Mike McKay	Scott Ninnis
PG	Al Green	Ray Wood	David Spear

== 1986 NBL clubs ==
Club	Location	Home Venue	Capacity	Founded	Head coach
Adelaide 36ers	Adelaide, South Australia	Apollo Stadium	3,000	1982	(Australia) Ken Cole
Brisbane Bullets	Brisbane, Queensland	Sleeman Sports Centre; Brisbane Entertainment Centre	2,700; 13,500	1979	(Australia) Brian Kerle
Canberra Cannons	Canberra, Australian Capital Territory	AIS Arena	5,200	1979	(United States) Bob Turner
Coburg Giants	(Victoria (state)) Melbourne, Victoria	The Glass House	7,200	1980	(United States) Bruce Palmer
Geelong Cats	(Victoria (state)) Geelong, Victoria	Geelong Arena	2,000	1982	(United States) Ken Richardson
Hobart Devils	Hobart, Tasmania	Kingborough Sports Centre	1,800	1983	(United States) David Adkins
Illawarra Hawks	Wollongong, New South Wales	Illawarra Basketball Stadium	2,000	1979	(Australia) Dave Lindstrom
Melbourne Tigers	(Victoria (state)) Melbourne, Victoria	Albert Park Basketball Stadium	2,000	1931	(Australia) Lindsay Gaze
Newcastle Falcons	Newcastle, New South Wales	Broadmeadow Basketball Stadium	2,200	1979	(Australia) Steve Johansen
Nunawading Spectres	(Victoria (state)) Melbourne, Victoria	Burwood Stadium	2,000	1979	(Australia) Barry Barnes
Perth Wildcats	Perth, Western Australia	Perry Lakes Basketball Stadium	1,500	1982	(Australia) Jay Brehmer
St Kilda Saints	(Victoria (state)) Melbourne, Victoria	The Glass House	7,200	1979	(Australia) Andris Blicavs
Sydney Supersonics	Sydney, New South Wales	State Sports Centre	5,006	1982	(Australia) Owen Wells
West Sydney Westars	Sydney, New South Wales	State Sports Centre	5,006	1982	(Australia) Robbie Cadee

== Regular season ==
=== Ladder ===
Pos	1986 NBL season											
Pos	Team	Pld	W	L	PCT	Last 5	Streak	Home	Away	PF	PA	PP
1	Adelaide 36ers	26	24	2	92.31%	5–0	W12	13–0	11–2	3016	2510	120.16%
2	Canberra Cannons	26	19	7	73.11%	4–1	W1	11–2	8–5	2718	2520	107.86%
3	Brisbane Bullets	26	17	9	65.38%	3–2	W1	10–3	7–6	2650	2485	106.64%
4	West Sydney Westars^{1}	26	15	11	57.69%	3–2	W2	8–5	7–6	2519	2492	101.08%
5	Illawarra Hawks^{1}	26	15	11	57.69%	3–2	W2	10–3	5–8	2551	2472	103.20%
6	Sydney Supersonics^{2}	26	14	12	53.85%	3–2	W2	8–5	7–6	2518	2438	103.28%
7	Geelong Cats^{2}	26	14	12	53.85%	2–3	W1	8–5	6–7	2875	2889	99.52%
8	Coburg Giants^{2}	26	14	12	53.85%	2–3	W2	9–4	5–8	2841	2825	100.57%
9	Nunawading Spectres	26	12	14	46.15%	4–1	L1	8–5	4–9	2592	2642	98.11%
10	Newcastle Falcons	26	10	16	38.46%	1–4	L4	6–7	4–9	2782	2878	96.66%
11	Hobart Devils	26	9	17	34.62%	2–3	L1	7–6	2–11	2606	2704	96.38%
12	Perth Wildcats	26	8	18	30.77%	0–5	L5	6–7	2–11	2458	2693	91.27%
13	Melbourne Tigers	26	6	20	23.08%	1–4	L1	5–8	1–12	2822	3089	91.36%
14	St. Kilda Saints	26	5	21	19.23%	1–4	L2	3–10	2–11	2742	3053	89.81%

Updated to match(es) played on 28 September 1986. Source: NBL.com.au

=== Game log ===
==== Regular season ====
- All home games were broadcast on Channel 10

1985–86 game log
Total: 24–2 (Home: 13–0; Road: 11–2)
April: 1–0 (Home: 1–0; Road: 0–0)

Game	Date	Team	Score	High points	High rebounds	High assists	Location Attendance	Record
1	26 April	Supersonics	W 107–96	Bill Jones (30)	Mark Davis (10)	Mark Davis (3)	Apollo Stadium; 3,000	1–0

May : 6–1 (Home: 3–0; Road: 3–1)

Game	Date	Team	Score	High points	High rebounds	High assists	Location Attendance	Record
2	3 May	Devils	W 108–72	Mark Davis (20)	Bill Jones (14)	Al Green (4)	Apollo Stadium; 3,000	2–0
3	10 May	Hawks	W 114–110	Bill Jones (27)	Mark Davis (19)	Al Green (2)	Apollo Stadium; 3,000	3–0
4	16 May	@ Devils	W 97–69	Mark Davis (33)	Mark Davis (18)	Peter Ali & Al Green (6)	Kingborough Sports Centre; 1,800	4–0
5	17 May	@ Saints	W 125–97	Mark Davis (35)	Bill Jones (18)	Darryl Pearce (7)	Albert Park Basketball Stadium; 2,000	5–0
6	24 May	Cannons	W 124–91	Mark Davis (30)	Mark Davis (23)	Bill Jones, Peter Ali & Mark Davis (4)	Apollo Stadium; 3,000	6–0
7	30 May	@ Falcons	W 98–96	Mark Davis (26)	Mark Davis & Bill Jones (18)	Al Green & Darryl Pearce (3)	Broadmeadow Basketball Stadium; 2,200	7–0
8	31 May	@ Westars	L 87–89	Mark Davis (26)	Mark Davis (23)	Al Green (4)	State Sports Centre; 5,006	7–1

June : 3–0 (Home: 2–0; Road: 1–0)

Game	Date	Team	Score	High points	High rebounds	High assists	Location Attendance	Record
9	7 June	Falcons	W 119–92	Al Green & Bill Jones (28)	Mark Davis & Bill Jones (14)	Mark Davis (6)	Apollo Stadium; 3,000	8–1
10	14 June	@ Wildcats	W 117–85	Darryl Pearce (23)	Mark Davis (16)	Mark Davis (8)	Perry Lakes Basketball Stadium; 1,500	9–1
11	21 June	Spectres	W 124–104	Mark Davis (42)	Mark Davis (18)	Darryl Pearce (6)	Apollo Stadium; 3,000	10–1

July : 3–1 (Home: 2–0; Road: 1–1)

Game	Date	Team	Score	High points	High rebounds	High assists	Location Attendance	Record
12	12 July	Wildcats	W 124–83	Al Green (35)	Mark Davis (18)	Al Green (7)	Apollo Stadium; 3,000	11–1
13	19 July	@ Cats	W 109–107	Mark Davis (25)	Mark Davis (21)	Al Green & Mark Davis (3)	Geelong Arena; 2,000	12–1
14	20 July	@ Giants	L 114–116	Darryl Pearce (30)	Bill Jones (14)	Al Green (8)	The Glass House; 7,200	12–2
15	26 July	Tigers	W 140–101	Al Green (33)	Mark Davis (16)	Darryl Pearce (5)	Apollo Stadium; 3,000	13–2

August : 5–0 (Home: 3–0; Road: 2–0)

Game	Date	Team	Score	High points	High rebounds	High assists	Location Attendance	Record
16	2 August	Bullets	W 120–92	Mark Davis (32)	Dwayne Nelson (16)	Al Green (5)	Apollo Stadium; 3,000	14–2
17	9 August	Giants	W 137–111	Dwayne Nelson (24)	Bill Jones (17)	Al Green (9)	Apollo Stadium; 3,000	15–2
18	15 August	@ Hawks	W 100–79	Darryl Pearce (24)	Mark Davis (15)	Darryl Pearce (4)	Illawarra Basketball Stadium; 2,000	16–2
19	16 August	@ Supersonics	W 100–75	Bill Jones (23)	Bill Jones (24)	Al Green (3)	State Sports Centre; 5,006	17–2
20	30 August	Cats	W 120–119	Bill Jones & Mark Davis (24)	Bill Jones (20)	Al Green (6)	Apollo Stadium; 3,000	18–2

September: 6–0 (Home: 2–0; Road: 4–0)

Game	Date	Team	Score	High points	High rebounds	High assists	Location Attendance	Record
21	6 September	Saints	W 138–98	Darryl Pearce (29)	Mark Davis (24)	Darryl Pearce (4)	Apollo Stadium; 3,000	19–2
22	13 September	@ Cannons	W 118–104	Mark Davis (35)	Mark Davis (17)	Al Green (5)	AIS Arena; 5,200	20–2
23	14 September	@ Bullets	W 124–115	Mark Davis (38)	Mark Davis (18)	Darryl Pearce (6)	Brisbane Entertainment Centre; 8,000	21–2
24	20 September	Westars	W 124–98	Mark Davis (31)	Bill Jones (15)	Al Green & Darryl Pearce (3)	Apollo Stadium; 3,000	22–2
25	27 September	@ Spectres	W 98–94	Bill Jones (28)	Mark Davis (17)	Darryl Pearce (8)	Burwood Stadium; 2,000	23–2
26	28 September	@ Tigers	W 130–117	Mark Davis (34)	Mark Davis (14)	Darryl Pearce (8)	Albert Park Basketball Stadium; 2,000	24–2

==== Finals ====
One Game Semi-final, 3 Game Grand Final

1985–86 game log
Semi-finals: 1–0 (Home: 1–0; Road: 0–0)

Game	Date	Team	Score	High points	High rebounds	High assists	Location Attendance	Record
SF	4 October	Hawks	W 116–92	Darryl Pearce (28)	Mark Davis (14)	Darryl Pearce (7)	Apollo Stadium; 3,000	1–0

1985–86 game log
Grand Final: 2–1 (Home: 1–1; Road: 1–0)

Game	Date	Team	Score	High points	High rebounds	High assists	Location Attendance	Record
GF1	11 October	@ Bullets	W 122–119 (OT)	Mark Davis (38)	Mark Davis (23)	Mark Davis (5)	Brisbane Entertainment Centre; 11,000	1–0
GF2	17 October	Bullets	L 83–104	Darryl Pearce (29)	Bill Jones (17)	Darryl Pearce (6)	Apollo Stadium; 3,000	1–1
GF3	19 October	Bullets	W 113–91	Darryl Pearce (27)	Mark Davis (25)	Darryl Pearce (2)	Apollo Stadium; 3,000	2–1

== Player statistics ==
=== Regular season ===
Legend
GP	Games played	GS	Games started	MPG	Minutes per game
FG%	Field-goal percentage	3P%	3-point field-goal percentage	FT%	Free-throw percentage
RPG	Rebounds per game	APG	Assists per game	SPG	Steals per game
BPG	Blocks per game	PPG	Points per game

No.	Player	GP	GS	MPG	FG%	3FG%	FT%	RPG	APG	SPG	BPG	PPG
4	Darryl Pearce	25	25	NA	.407	.375	.880	3.0	3.7	1.1	0.2	18.4
6	Scott Ninnis	10	0	NA	.375	1.000	.333	0.2	0.0	0.0	0.0	0.8
8	Peter Ali	26	26	NA	.511	.333	.769	2.2	1.0	0.7	0.1	4.0
9	Ray Wood	26	0	NA	.439	.388	.866	1.8	0.8	0.9	0.1	2.1
10	Mike McKay	26	1	NA	.477	.453	.755	2.5	1.2	0.5	0.4	13.9
12	Peter Sexton	12	0	NA	.571	.000	.000	0.2	0.1	0.0	0.0	0.6
14	Bill Jones (C)	26	26	NA	.564	.000	.602	13.2	0.9	1.2	2.1	19.0
15	Al Green	26	26	NA	.502	.382	.690	4.6	3.7	1.1	0.4	20.1
20	Dwayne Nelson	26	0	NA	.566	.000	.702	5.2	0.3	0.5	0.5	7.5
32	David Spear	24	0	NA	.536	.500	.833	0.1	0.3	0.0	0.0	1.3
33	Mark Davis	26	26	NA	.571	.159	.736	15.8	2.2	1.1	0.7	25.7

=== Team Leaders ===
- Points per game: 25.7 - Mark Davis
- Rebounds per game: 15.8 - Mark Davis
- Assists per game: 3.7 - Al Green and Darryl Pearce
- Steals per game: 1.2 - Bill Jones
- Blocks per game: 2.1 - Bill Jones

=== Finals ===
Legend
GP	Games played	GS	Games started	MPG	Minutes per game
FG%	Field-goal percentage	3P%	3-point field-goal percentage	FT%	Free-throw percentage
RPG	Rebounds per game	APG	Assists per game	SPG	Steals per game
BPG	Blocks per game	PPG	Points per game

No.	Player	GP	GS	MPG	FG%	3FG%	FT%	RPG	APG	SPG	BPG	PPG
4	Darryl Pearce	4	4	NA	.379	.375	.500	3.5	4.6	0.5	0.0	24.3
6	Scott Ninnis	1	0	NA	.000	.000	.000	0.0	0.0	0.0	0.0	0.0
8	Peter Ali	4	4	NA	.519	.000	.714	4.0	0.5	1.8	0.0	3.5
9	Ray Wood	4	0	NA	.375	.250	.333	0.7	1.5	0.9	0.1	2.1
10	Mike McKay	4	0	NA	.388	.333	.714	1.0	1.0	1.5	0.5	11.8
12	Peter Sexton	1	0	NA	.500	.000	.000	0.0	0.0	0.0	0.0	2.0
14	Bill Jones (C)	4	4	NA	.526	.000	.579	10.0	0.7	1.0	2.5	17.8
15	Al Green	4	4	NA	.531	.375	.666	4.3	2.0	0.7	0.7	15.3
20	Dwayne Nelson	4	0	NA	.368	.000	.875	3.5	0.5	0.0	0.5	5.3
32	David Spear	1	0	NA	.000	.000	.000	0.0	0.0	0.0	0.0	0.0
33	Mark Davis	4	4	NA	.500	.000	.733	18.0	2.0	1.2	0.5	22.5

=== Team Leaders ===
- Points per game: 24.3 - Darryl Pearce
- Rebounds per game: 18.0 - Mark Davis
- Assists per game: 4.6 - Darryl Pearce
- Steals per game: 1.8 - Peter Ali
- Blocks per game: 2.5 - Bill Jones

== Awards ==
=== NBL Award Winners ===
All-NBL First team – Mark Davis (Centre)
Grand Final MVP – Mark Davis
NBL Coach of the Year – Ken Cole
NBL Leading Rebounder – Mark Davis (482 @ 16.1 pg)
Adelaide 36ers Club MVP – Mark Davis

== Season summary ==
=== Regular season ===
The 1986 Adelaide 36ers were determined to go one better and avenge their Grand Final loss to the Brisbane Bullets in 1985. Former import player in 1984 and now Australian citizen Dwayne Nelson rejoined the club who were on the lookout for a player who could handle Brisbane's star import Leroy Loggins. Nelson, who had averaged 25.9 points and 10.1 rebounds in 24 games in 1984, adjusted well to his new role as a bench player backing up both Mark Davis and Peter Ali.

The 36ers enjoyed their best ever year when they went through the regular season with a league leading 24–2 record which included winning all 13 games played at the Apollo Stadium, the first time in NBL history that a team had gone through a regular season undefeated on their home court. As expected, the team was led by its Twin Towers import front court combination of centre Bill Jones and Power forward Mark Davis and along with the tough defence of 1980 Olympic Games forward Peter Ali and Dwayne Nelson, plus the scoring ability of guards Al Green, Darryl Pearce and Mike McKay, the 36ers emerged as the league's dominant team.

Adelaide only lost two games for the season, both away from home and both came from last second shots against the West Sydney Westars and Coburg Giants respectively. Those two losses ultimately denied Adelaide a perfect season by no more than a couple of seconds, but earned the team the nickname "The Invincibles", given to them by Adelaide's multi-award-winning basketball journalist Boti Nagy. The team generally dominated on his home court at the Apollo Stadium which was regularly sold-out for games. The closest any team came to beating Adelaide at home was on 30 August against the Geelong Cats. With 13 seconds remaining, a 3-pointer from Cats veteran Boomers forward Ian Davies gave the visitors a 119–118 lead and it appeared might Adelaide would lose at home for the first time. Following a quick inbound pass, Mike McKay brought the ball down court and managed to get a pass through double team defence to an open Darryl Pearce who put up a 3-point shot with only 2 seconds remaining that missed. Captain Bill Jones flew high to grab the rebound and in one motion tip-dunked the ball to give the 36ers a 120–119 win on the buzzer.

On their home court, the 36ers had an average score of 123–92 while their average away score was 109–96. This gave the team an average score of 116–94 for the regular season.

Despite the on court success, there was controversy at the club late in the season with coach Ken Cole suspended by the club board over his smoking of marijuana joint during a road trip to Brisbane, a situation that Cole was open about and never denied, stating publicly that he was recommended it by his family doctor as a way of dealing with health problems and physical pain. After the story was broken in one of Adelaide's daily newspaper's at the time, The Advertiser, Cole was suspended by the club for the last two games and the team was coached by his assistant Don Shipway. The story was broken by journalist Andrew Both who was in Shipway's hotel room following their win over the Bullets when Cole asked those present if they minded him smoking the joint since he didn't drink. Also in the room were Shipway and players Peter Ali, Darryl Pearce and Scott Ninnis who were only drinking alcohol. Before the playoffs, the players (who to this day believe that Both was made to write the story) got together and went to the club board demanding Cole's return, going so far as to tell the board that they would refuse to play unless Cole was coaching them. Under immense pressure from not only the players but the general public of Adelaide who supported Cole despite his admitted use of the drug, the club board relented and Cole returned for the 1986 playoffs, though it was known that he would be sacked over the incident at the end of the season regardless of a championship win or not. During the year there had been rumours that the club board had not been happy with Cole despite the team's success, with Cole called before the club board after the tight home win over Geelong (2 weeks before the marijuana incident) to explain why the team wasn't dominating like they had hoped (the 36ers had an 18–2 record following the win over Geelong).

== NBL Finals ==
=== Semi-finals ===
Along with the 2nd placed Canberra Cannons, the 36ers were given a bye in the Quarter-finals. In their single game Semi-final against the 4th placed Illawarra Hawks, and with Ken Cole back as coach (when he was introduced to the crowd they gave Cole a 3-minute standing ovation showing their support), the 36ers as expected never gave the Hawks a look-in despite a heroic 28 points and 14 rebounds from their 6'10" (208 cm) Australian Boomers centre Ray Borner, with the 36ers leading 28–14 at the end of the first 12-minute period. Led by Darryl Pearce with 28 points and 7 assists, Al Green with 27 points and 8 rebounds, and with strong contributions from Mark Davis (17 points and 14 rebounds) and Bill Jones with 12 points and 13 rebounds, Adelaide ran out easy 116–92 winners to book their place in the club's second straight Grand Final.

== NBL Grand Final ==
The 36ers opponents in the 1986 NBL Grand Final would again be the Brisbane Bullets who had come from behind to win their semi-final 120–100 over the Cannons at the AIS Arena in Canberra. After 7 years with the Grand Final being a single game, in 1986 the NBL decided to follow the NBA's model of a playoff series to determine the championship. The Grand Final became a 3-game series with the first game to be held at the Bullets new 1986 home, the 13,500 capacity Brisbane Entertainment Centre (by far the largest and most modern venue in the NBL in 1986, able to hold some 6,300 more than the next largest venue, the 7,200 seat Glass House in Melbourne) with Games 2 and 3 (if required) at the Apollo Stadium.

To the NBL's delight, the series went the full 3 games with the opening game in Brisbane attracting an Australian record indoor sporting attendance of 11,000.

Game 1 in Brisbane was hailed as one of the best games of basketball ever seen in Australia. The Bullets led early, but a 28–15 second period with Davis leading the scoring and rebounding saw Adelaide shoot to a 52–41 half time lead. After sitting out most of the 2nd with foul trouble, Leroy Loggins lit up in the 3rd to drag Brisbane back into the game and Adelaide's lead was cut to 76–73 with one period remaining. Late in the last, Bill Jones pulled off the play of the series when he stepped in front of Loggins to take a charge which saw Brisbane's leading man foul out of the game, though Brisbane rallied and the score was tied at 111–111 at the end of regulation time. In overtime the 36ers finally overcame the Bullets to win 122–119 and take a 1–0 series lead. Mark Davis led the way for the 36ers with 38 points, 23 rebounds and 5 assists. He was well supported by Bill Jones (30 pts, 17 rebounds and 3 blocks), Mike McKay with 16 points and Darryl Pearce with 13 points, 4 rebounds and 4 assists. For the Bullets, Loggins had 38 points, 6 blocks and 4 assists.

Adelaide were expected to wrap up the series in Game 2 at the Apollo where they had not lost all season. However, Cal Bruton refused to let the defending champions be swept. The Black Pearl scored 38 points and with Mark Davis restricted due to an elbow injury suffered early in the game, the Bullets ran out shock 104–83 winners and handing Adelaide their first loss at home since 15 June 1985 ending a streak of 20 straight home wins.

Game 3, played on 19 October, saw a 43-point turn around with the Adelaide 36ers winning their first NBL Championship with a hard-fought 113–91 win, though the scoreline didn't tell how close the game was for the first three periods with Adelaide only leading 80–76 going into the final period of play. Leading the way for the 36ers was Darryl Pearce with 27 points, 4 rebounds and 2 assists. Mark Davis scored 22 points but dominated the boards, grabbing 25 rebounds, while Al Green finally put together a good Grand Final performance after relatively poor games (by his standards) for West Adelaide in 1982, 1983 (where he fouled out), and again for the 36ers in 1985 where he again fouled out of the game, scoring only 15 points (well below his 1985 season average of 31.0 ppg). Green scored 22 points and grabbed 3 rebounds. The pivotal moment of the game came when Leroy Loggins fouled out in just the 3rd period. To that point of the game he had been closely checked by Peter Ali, Dwayne Nelson and Mike McKay in a great defensive performance which restricted a frustrated Loggins (who in 1986 averaged 29.8 points per game which won him his second straight NBL MVP award) to just 6 points.

Mark Davis with an average of 24.3 points, 19.3 rebounds and 1.6 assists over the 3 games was named the Most Valuable Player for the Grand Final series. Davis, who averaged 25.3 points and a league leading 16.1 rebounds for the year, was also named as the 36ers Club MVP winner for the second straight year and was also named at centre in the All-NBL First team.

=== Game 1 ===
TV 0

11 October
7:30 p.m. EST

boxscore

Brisbane Bullets 119, Adelaide 36ers 122 (OT)
Scoring by quarter: 26-24, 15-28, 32-24, 38-35, Overtime: 8-11
Pts: Leroy Loggins 38; Rebs: Larry Sengstock 8 Asts: Ron Radliff 6	Pts: Mark Davis 38; Rebs: Mark Davis 23; Asts: Mark Davis 5
Adelaide leads series, 1–0

Brisbane Entertainment Centre
Attendance: 11,000
Referees: Ray Hunt, Steve Bignell

=== Game 2 ===
SAS 10

17 October
7:30 p.m. CST

boxscore

Adelaide 36ers 83, Brisbane Bullets 104
Scoring by quarter: 20-31, 33-23, 18-31, 12-19
Pts: Darryl Pearce 29; Rebs: Bill Jones 17; Asts: Darryl Pearce 6	Pts: Cal Bruton 38; Rebs: Leroy Loggins 11; Asts: Ron Radliff 5
Series tied, 1–1

Apollo Stadium, Adelaide
Attendance: 3,000
Referees: Ray Hunt, Eddie Crouch

=== Game 3 ===
SAS 10

19 October
2:00 p.m. CST

boxscore

Adelaide 36ers 113, Brisbane Bullets 91
Scoring by quarter: 35-25, 19-27, 26-24, 33-15
Pts: Darryl Pearce 27; Rebs: Mark Davis 25; Asts: Darryl Pearce 2	Pts: Cal Bruton 31; Rebs: Larry Sengstock 14; Asts: Leroy Loggins 5
Adelaide wins series and NBL Championship, 2–1; Grand Final MVP: Mark Davis (Adelaide)

Apollo Stadium, Adelaide
Attendance: 3,000
Referees: Ray Hunt, Eddie Crouch

== Accolades ==
Although debate still rages among fans of the National Basketball League, in 2012 the 1986 Adelaide 36ers were named by the NBL as the greatest single season team in league history.

In 2016, the 1986 NBL champion 36ers had their 30th anniversary in an official function held by the club in the Scouts Deck restaurant located in the 36ers home venue (since 1992), the Titanium Security Arena.

== See also ==
- Adelaide 36ers
- Brisbane Bullets
- National Basketball League (Australia)
- 1986 NBL season
- 1986 NBL Finals
