= Scott Ninnis =

Australian basketball player and coach (born 1965)

Personal information
- Born: 28 December 1965 (age 60) Adelaide, South Australia, Australia
- Listed height: 188 cm (6 ft 2 in)
- Listed weight: 84 kg (185 lb)

Career information
- Playing career: 1986–1998
- Position: Shooting guard / point guard
- Number: 6, 9, 21
- Coaching career: 1998–2010, 2022–present

Career history

Playing
- 1986–1990: South Adelaide Panthers
- 1986–1990: Adelaide 36ers
- 1987: Adelaide Buffaloes
- 1991: Eastside Melbourne Spectres
- 1992: South East Melbourne Magic
- 1993–1995: Adelaide 36ers
- 1993–1995: South Adelaide Panthers
- 1996: Newcastle Falcons
- 1997–1998: Adelaide 36ers
- 1997–1998: South Adelaide Panthers

Coaching
- 1998–2003: Adelaide 36ers (assistant)
- 2001–2002, 2004: Sturt Sabres
- 2004–2005: Townsville Crocodiles (assistant)
- 2006–2007: South Dragons (assistant)
- 2008–2010: Adelaide 36ers
- 2022–2023: South Adelaide Panthers
- 2023: Adelaide 36ers (assistant)
- 2023–2024: Adelaide 36ers (interim)
- 2024–2025: Adelaide Lightning

Career highlights
- As player: 3× NBL champion (1986, 1992, 1998); All-NBL Third Team (1993); SEABL champion (1987); 4× SA State League champion (1987, 1989, 1995, 1997); NBL Most Improved Player (1993); Woollacott Medalist (1995); As head coach: NBL1 Central champion (2022); CABL Central Conference champion (2001, 2002); CABL Coach of the Year (2001, 2002); As assistant coach: 2× NBL champion (1999, 2002)

Scott Ninnis (born 28 December 1965) is an Australian basketball coach and former professional player. He won three National Basketball League (NBL) championships during his career: in 1986 and 1998 with the Adelaide 36ers and 1992 with the South East Melbourne Magic. Ninnis was an assistant coach with the club when they won the 1998–99 and 2001–02 NBL championships. He was appointed as the 36ers' head coach in 2008 and coached them for two seasons. After a coaching hiatus, he returned to the 36ers' staff in 2023 as an assistant and was appointed as interim head coach midway through the 2023–24 season. Despite re-signing with the 36ers to remain as head coach, he was sacked during the following offseason. Ninnis served as head coach for the Adelaide Lightning of the Women's National Basketball League during the 2024–25 season.

== Professional career ==
After producing a 40-point game against the West Adelaide Bearcats in the local Adelaide competition in early 1985, Ninnis was invited to train with National Basketball League team the Adelaide 36ers by 36ers coach Ken Cole in 1985, training against NBL stars such as Al Green, Darryl Pearce, Mike McKay, Ray Wood, Bill Jones, Peter Ali and Mark Davis.

Ninnis made his NBL debut on 12 July 1986 during Round 10 of the 1986 NBL season against the Perth Wildcats at the home of the 36ers, the Apollo Stadium. He would go on to play 13 more regular season games for the team which compiled a league best 24–2 record during the regular season, earning the team the nickname "The Invincibles". The 1986 Adelaide 36ers would go on to win their first NBL Grand Final in 1986, defeating the defending champions the Brisbane Bullets 2–1 in the Grand Final series. Ninnis only got to play in the final 30 seconds of Game 3 during the series which the 36ers won 113–91.

36ers coach Ken Cole was sacked after a marijuana smoking controversy in 1986 and was replaced by former NBL import guard Gary Fox. Unfortunately for Ninnis, Fox sent him down to play with the Adelaide Buffaloes in the SEABL in 1987 and he only played 2 NBL games during the 1987 NBL season (for a total of just 5 minutes and 18 seconds). However, it was not a total loss for Ninnis as the Buffaloes would go on to win the SEABL championship that year after defeating the Ballarat Miners in the Grand Final.

Ninnis was recalled back into the 36ers squad by Fox full-time from 1988. He would remain with the club until the end of the 1990 NBL season before making the decision that if he wanted to further his game he would need a change of scenery. He then signed with the Brian Goorjian coached Eastside Melbourne Spectres in 1991 NBL season and played in his second NBL Grand Final that year, though the Spectres went down to the defending champion Perth Wildcats.

While playing for the 36ers, Ninnis continued to play for the South Adelaide Panthers in the SA State League, winning the championship in 1987 and again in 1989.

The Spectres and the Southern Melbourne Saints merged prior to the 1992 NBL season to become the South East Melbourne Magic with Ninnis signing with the new team who would be coached by Brian Goorjian. Alongside teammates including Tony Ronaldson, Bruce Bolden, Robert Rose, John Dorge and Australian Boomers head coach Andrej Lemanis, Ninnis won his second NBL Championship after the Magic defeated cross-town rivals the Melbourne Tigers 2–1 in the Grand Final series. During Game 1 of the series, Magic point guard Darren Perry went down with an injury. Ninnis, normally a shooting guard, stepped in and played the point for the remainder of the series.

Ninnis returned home to play for the 36ers in 1993 and would go on to win that season's NBL Most Improved Player award. Statistically, 1993 would be Ninnis's best year in the NBL, averaging 19.4 points, 3.1 rebounds and 4.7 assists for the season.

In 1994 under the coaching of Mike Dunlap, the 36ers reached their first NBL Grand Final since 1986, but the team would be swept 2–0 in the series by the North Melbourne Giants. At the end of the 1995 NBL season where the 36ers were beaten by the eventual champion Perth Wildcats in the semi-finals, Ninnis was cut from the team by Dunlap who as a former NCAA college basketball coach, had gained a reputation for favouring the younger players at the expense of the team veterans (during this period the 36ers also cut veterans Phil Smyth (1994), Robert Rose and Mike McKay (1996).

Upon returning to Adelaide in 1993, Ninnis rejoined South Adelaide in the local State League and won the championship for the third time in 1995. That year he also won the Woollacott Medal as the State League's fairest and most brilliant player.

After being cut by the 36ers, Ninnis signed for the struggling Newcastle Falcons for the 1996 NBL season. Ninnis would only spend one year with the Falcons before again returning to the 36ers in 1997 after Dunlap left the club and was replaced with Dave Claxton.

Phil Smyth returned to the 36ers in 1998 as a rookie head coach and immediately turned the 36ers into a championship winning team. Alongside team captain Brett Maher, Mark Davis (the only other survivor of the 1986 championship team), Martin Cattalini, Paul Rees and former Denver Nuggets players Darnell Mee and Kevin Brooks, the 36ers would win their second and Ninnis's third NBL championship in 1998 after sweeping the Magic, whose own record that year had almost rivaled that of the 1986 36ers, 2–0 in the Grand Final.

Ninnis won his fourth SA State League championship with South Adelaide in 1997.

Ninnis retired from playing following the 1998 NBL season, having played 318 games and averaging 9.2 points, 1.7 rebounds and 2.2 assists per game.

== Coaching career ==
Following the 36ers 1998 championship win, coach Phil Smyth offered Ninnis the chance of a one-year playing contract or a position as the team's assistant coach alongside former NBL player Steve Breheny. Ninnis accepted the offer to become the 36ers assistant coach and in that position would go on to win two more NBL championships in 1998–99 and 2001–02. Ninnis would continue as the club's assistant coach until the end of the 2002–03 NBL season.

In 2001–02 while still the assistant coach with the 36ers, Ninnis coached the Sturt Sabres in the CABL. During that time the Sabres were the CABL Central Conference Champions with Ninnis named as the CABL Coach of the Year in 2002.

After not coaching Sturt in 2003, Ninnis returned in 2004 before accepting an offer to become assistant coach of the NBL's Townsville Crocodiles for the 2004–05 NBL season. He then became the assistant coach to former NBA All-Star Mark Price (later replaced by Shane Heal) at the club South Dragons from 2006 to 2007.

With Smyth not retained by the 36ers after missing the playoffs two seasons in a row, Ninnis became an NBL head coach in 2008–09, leading the 36ers to that year's quarter-finals where they were beaten in a single-game playoff by the New Zealand Breakers, coached by his former Magic teammate Andrej Lemanis. After the 36ers finished with its first wooden spoon in 2009–10, Ninnis was sacked by the 36ers.

On 25 October 2021, Ninnis was announced as head coach of the South Adelaide Panthers for the 2022 NBL1 Central season. He led the Panthers to a championship in 2022.

In April 2023, Ninnis re-joined the 36ers as an assistant coach for the 2023–24 NBL season. On 6 December 2023, he was elevated to interim head coach for the rest of the season after the team parted ways with C. J. Bruton. He coached 15 games and led Adelaide to an 8–7 record. Immediately following the conclusion of the 36ers' season, Ninnis signed a two-year contract to continue as head coach. However, on 12 August 2024, the 36ers sacked Ninnis and replaced him with their new assistant, Mike Wells.

On 17 December 2024, Ninnis was appointed head coach of the Adelaide Lightning of the Women's National Basketball League (WNBL) for the rest of the 2024–25 season. He replaced Natalie Hurst who had led the Lightning to a 2–6 start. The Lightning finished the season with a 7–14 record. He was not retained as head coach.

Ninnis stated in a July 2025 interview that he would never coach professionally again.

Ninnis runs a basketball training program, MaherNinnis Basketball, alongside Brett Maher.

== Accolades ==
Ninnis appeared in 9 NBL finals series, 5 NBL Grand Finals and won 3 NBL championships as a player. He also won the SEABL Championship with the Adelaide Buffaloes in 1987 and won the SA State League Championship with South Adelaide in 1987, 1989, 1995 and 1997. In 1995, Ninnis won the Woollacott Medal as the fairest and most brilliant player in South Australian basketball.

In 1993, Ninnis was named as the NBL's Most Improved Player.

In March 2015, Ninnis had his #9 singlet retired by the South Adelaide Basketball Club. The Panthers also retired the #8 of Australian Basketball Hall of Fame members Michael Ah Matt (#8) who had played alongside Bruce Ninnis at the Panthers during the 1960s, as well as the #33 of Ninnis's long-time Adelaide 36ers teammate Mark Davis.

Ninnis is the only person as either a player or coach who has been a member of all four Adelaide 36ers NBL championship-winning teams.

== Personal life ==
Ninnis is married and has a son and daughter. He operates a wine tour business, Premium Wine Tours, which is based in the Barossa Valley and McLaren Vale.

== SA State League Honour roll ==
Team:	South Adelaide Panthers
Career:	1985–1990, 1993–1995, 1997–1998
Grand Final appearances:	4 (1987, 1989, 1995, 1997)
Championships:	4 (1987, 1989, 1995, 1997)
Woollacott Medalist:	1995

== NBL Honour roll ==
NBL career:	1986–1998
NBL Grand Final appearances:	5 (1986, 1991, 1992, 1994, 1998)
NBL Championships:	3 (1986, 1992, 1998)
NBL Finals appearances:	9 (1986, 1988, 1989, 1991, 1992, 1993, 1994, 1995, 1998)
NBL Most Improved Player:	1993

== NBL career stats ==
=== Player ===
Legend
GP	Games played	GS	Games started	MPG	Minutes per game
FG%	Field goal percentage	3P%	3-point field goal percentage	FT%	Free throw percentage
RPG	Rebounds per game	APG	Assists per game	SPG	Steals per game
BPG	Blocks per game	PPG	Points per game	**Bold**	Career high

†	Denotes season(s) in which Ninnis won an NBL championship

Year	Team	GP	GS	MPG	FG%	3P%	FT%	RPG	APG	SPG	BPG	PPG
1986†	Adelaide 36ers	14	0	NA	.375	**1.000**	.333	0.1	0.0	0.0	0.0	0.6
1987	Adelaide 36ers	2	0	2.5	**.667**	.000	.000	0.0	0.5	0.0	0.0	2.0
1988	Adelaide 36ers	18	0	12.3	.519	.389	.706	1.4	1.1	0.3	0.1	5.5
1989	Adelaide 36ers	24	0	15.8	.548	.370	.683	1.7	1.5	0.4	0.2	8.3
1990	Adelaide 36ers	26	0	22.0	.465	.355	.629	2.4	3.8	0.6	0.2	10.2
1991	Eastside Melbourne Spectres	**31**	0	12.4	.474	.254	.693	1.5	2.1	0.7	0.2	9.3
1992†	South East Melbourne Magic	30	0	23.9	.489	.280	.680	1.8	2.5	1.2	0.0	11.7
1993	Adelaide 36ers	28	**28**	**40.5**	.465	.390	.726	**3.1**	**4.7**	1.3	0.2	**19.4**
1994	Adelaide 36ers	33	NA	25.6	.465	.390	.726	2.0	3.0	**1.4**	0.1	12.6
1995	Adelaide 36ers	31	0	15.0	.411	.407	**.733**	1.7	1.4	0.8	0.0	5.6
1996	Newcastle Falcons	24	NA	27.9	.411	.407	.658	2.5	3.0	1.0	**0.3**	13.1
1997	Adelaide 36ers	27	0	10.8	.516	.273	.600	0.9	1.0	0.5	0.0	4.2
1998†	Adelaide 36ers	30	0	11.9	.451	.314	.653	1.0	1.1	0.4	0.0	5.4
**Career**		318	NA	NA	.474	.342	.683	1.7	2.2	0.8	0.1	9.2

=== Coaching ===
Legend
Regular season	G	Games coached	W	Games won	L	Games lost	W–L %	Win–loss %
Playoffs	PG	Playoff games	PW	Playoff wins	PL	Playoff losses	PW–L %	Playoff win–loss %

Team	Year	G	W	L	W–L%	Finish	PG	PW	PL	PW–L%	Result
Adelaide 36ers	2008–09	30	15	15	.500	6th	1	0	1	.000	Elimination-Finalists
Adelaide 36ers	2009–10	28	10	18	.357	8th	—	—	—	—	Missed Playoffs
Adelaide 36ers	2023–24	15	8	7	.533	9th	—	—	—	—	Missed Playoffs
**Career**		73	33	40	.452		1	0	1	.000	
