= John Dorge =

Australian basketball player (born 1962)

Personal information
- Born: 17 October 1962 (age 64) Toowoomba, Queensland
- Listed height: 209 cm (6 ft 10 in)
- Listed weight: 118 kg (260 lb)

Career information
- Playing career: 1985–1998
- Position: Centre

Career history
- 1985–1989: Brisbane Bullets
- 1990–1991: Geelong Supercats
- 1992–1998: South East Melbourne Magic

Career highlights
- 4× NBL champion (1985, 1987, 1992, 1996); All-NBL First Team (1995); All-NBL Second Team (1991)

John Dorge (born 17 October 1962 in Toowoomba, Queensland) is a former basketball player from Australia. Dorge played in Australia's National Basketball League (NBL) from 1985 to 1998, playing for the Brisbane Bullets, Geelong Supercats and the South East Melbourne Magic, winning four NBL championships as well as representing Australia in international competition.

== NBL career ==
John Dorge also known as the "towering chicken farmer", a 6-foot-10-inch (208 cm) tall centre, started his NBL career in 1985 playing for the Brian Kerle coached Brisbane Bullets. The Bullets, beaten Grand Finalists in 1984, would go one better in Dorge's rookie season when they defeated the Adelaide 36ers 121–95 to win the clubs first NBL championship. Among Dorge's teammates were the likes of Olympians Larry Sengstock and Danny Morseu, Leroy Loggins who would go on to be regarded as the best import player in NBL history, Cal Bruton, Ronnie "The Rat" Radliff and Robert Sibley.

The Bullets again made the NBL Grand Final in 1986, this time played over a 3-game series for the first time and again they would face the 36ers who had gone through the 1986 NBL season with a 24–2 record, including a 13–0 home record. In 1986 the Bullets had moved from the 2,700 capacity Sleeman Sports Centre into the 13,500 seat Brisbane Entertainment Centre and a then NBL record crowd of 11,000 saw the first game of the series go into overtime with the 36ers eventually running out winners 122–119. The Bullets then surprised in Game 2 at the Apollo Stadium in Adelaide, winning 104–83 before the 36ers wrapped up the series and their first championship with a 113–91 win in the deciding Game 3. Matched up against 6 ft 9 in (206 cm) 36ers centre and team captain Bill Jones (who averaged 19.6 points, 15.6 rebounds and 3 blocks), Dorge averaged 4.6 points, 5.6 rebounds and 1.6 blocks per game in the series.

Brisbane continued their successful run in 1987 and played in their fourth and Dorge's third Grand Final in succession. It was the first and only time in NBL history that a player had played in the Grand Final in his first three seasons in the league. The Bullets would sweep the Cal Bruton coached Perth Wildcats in two games giving John Dorge his second NBL championship. Dorge averaged 6 points, 5 rebounds and 1 block in the series.

The Bullets run finally ended in 1988 when they lost their Elimination final to the Wildcats. They then missed the playoffs altogether in 1989 in what would turn out to be Dorge's last season with the club. From 1990 he would join the Geelong Supercats for two seasons. The Supercats missed the playoffs in 1990, but in 1991 returned for their first post season play since 1984 but they were defeated in the Elimination final by the North Melbourne Giants. In the opening game of the 1991 season against North Melbourne, Dorge set the still standing (as of 2016–17) NBL record for blocks in a single game with 14.

After signing with new team the South East Melbourne Magic from 1992, John Dorge started to play to the potential many thought he had but had only shown glimpses of and he became one of the dominant big men in the NBL. The Brian Goorjian coached Magic, who boasted players such as Robert Rose, Tony Ronaldson, Bruce Bolden, Andrew Parkinson, Scott Ninnis and Andrej Lemanis, defeated the Melbourne Tigers in three games to win their first and Dorge's third NBL championship. Dorge averaged 11.3 points, 8.6 rebounds and 2.3 blocks in the series.

Dorge would play another 6 NBL seasons with the Magic, including winning the 1996 NBL Grand Final over the Tigers, and being selected to the All-NBL First Team in 1995 when he averaged a career best 16.1 points, 12.3 rebounds and 3.0 blocks for the season. He retired from the NBL following the Magic's two game loss to the Adelaide 36ers in the 1998 NBL Grand Final having played in 363 NBL games.

== International ==
Dorge made his Australian Boomers debut in 1987 in a home test series against the Soviet Union where he was matched up against Russia's giant 7 ft 3 in (221 cm) Vladimir Tkachenko. Although he would ultimately miss selection for the 1988 Olympics in Seoul (largely due to the emergence of 7 ft 2 in (218 cm) centre Luc Longley), he was part of the squad that finished 6th at the 1992 Barcelona and an improved 4th in Atlanta at the 1996 Olympic Games. In both tournaments Dorge played as the back up to Longley who by 1996 was the starting centre for the NBA champion Chicago Bulls.

Dorge played for the Boomers in their 5-game 'exhibition' series against the Magic Johnson All-Stars in March 1995 and counts hitting a skyhook over Magic himself in Game 2 at the Brisbane Entertainment Centre as one of his career highlights. Due to the absence of Longley who was playing for the Chicago Bulls, and Australia's other big men in 6 ft 10 in (208 cm) players Mark Bradtke and Ray Borner (who did play in Game 5 in Perth), Dorge (along with North Melbourne's 6 ft 9 in (206 cm) centre Paul Rees), was the Australian starting centre through the series.

== Coaching ==
After his playing career, John Dorge took up coaching basketball in New Zealand, winning the New Zealand NBL Coach of the Year Award while coaching the Harbour Heat in the 2007 NZNBL season.

== Honour roll ==
NBL career:	1985–1998
NBL Grand Final appearances:	7 (1985, 1986, 1987, 1992, 1996, 1997, 1998)
NBL Championships:	4 (1985, 1987, 1992, 1996)
NBL Finals appearances:	11 (1985, 1986, 1987, 1988, 1992, 1993, 1994, 1995, 1996, 1997, 1998)

== NBL career stats ==
Games:	363 (139 Bris, 53 Geel, 171 Magic)
Rebounds:	8.0 pg
Points:	3,709 (10.2 pg)
Free Throws:	695 / 1,082 (64.2%)
Field goals:	1,507 / 2,690 (56.0%)
3 Points:	–
Steals:	0.6 pg
Assists:	0.7 pg
Blocks:	0.6 pg
