= 1986 NBL Finals =

- League: National Basketball League
- Sport: Basketball
- Duration: 1–19 October 1986
- Number of teams: 6
- TV partner(s): ABC; SAS-10 (Adelaide); TV0 (Brisbane)

NBL Finals
- Champions: Adelaide 36ers
- Runners-up: Brisbane Bullets
- Finals MVP: Mark Davis

Seasons
- ← 1985 1987 →

The 1986 NBL Finals was the championship series of the 1986 season of Australia's National Basketball League (NBL) and the conclusion of the season's playoffs. The Adelaide 36ers defeated the Brisbane Bullets in three games (2-1) for the first NBL championship.

== Format ==
The 1986 National Basketball League Finals was played in October 1986 between the top six teams of the regular season, consisting of knockout Elimination Finals and Semifinals followed by the league's first ever three-game Grand Final series.

== Qualification ==
=== Qualified teams ===
Team	Finals appearance	Previous appearance	Previous best performance
Adelaide 36ers	3rd	1985	Runner-up (1985)
Canberra Cannons	5th	1985	Champions (1983, 1984)
Brisbane Bullets	5th	1985	Champions (1985)
Sydney Supersonics	2nd	1983	1983 minor premiers
Illawarra Hawks	2nd	1984	8th in 1984
West Sydney Westars	1st	-	First season in NBL

The Ken Cole coached Adelaide 36ers had stormed through the regular season with a 24–2 record, including a 13–0 record on their home court at the Apollo Stadium, to finish 5 games clear of the Canberra Cannons and 7 clear of the defending champion Brisbane Bullets. They were also the only team in the league to score over 3,000 points during the season (3,016) and went into the Finals on a 12-game winning streak. The 36ers only losses for the regular season had come away from home on last second buzzer beaters from the West Sydney Westars and Coburg Giants respectively.

=== Ladder ===
This is the ladder at the end of season, before the finals. The top 6 teams qualified for the finals series.

Pos	1986 NBL season											
Pos	Team	Pld	W	L	PCT	Last 5	Streak	Home	Away	PF	PA	PP
1	Adelaide 36ers	26	24	2	92.31%	5–0	W12	13–0	11–2	3016	2510	120.16%
2	Canberra Cannons	26	19	7	73.11%	4–1	W1	11–2	8–5	2718	2520	107.86%
3	Brisbane Bullets	26	17	9	65.38%	3–2	W1	10–3	7–6	2650	2485	106.64%
4	West Sydney Westars^{1}	26	15	11	57.69%	3–2	W2	8–5	7–6	2519	2492	101.08%
5	Illawarra Hawks^{1}	26	15	11	57.69%	3–2	W2	10–3	5–8	2551	2472	103.20%
6	Sydney Supersonics^{2}	26	14	12	53.85%	3–2	W2	8–5	7–6	2518	2438	103.28%
7	Geelong Cats^{2}	26	14	12	53.85%	2–3	W1	8–5	6–7	2875	2889	99.52%
8	Coburg Giants^{2}	26	14	12	53.85%	2–3	W2	9–4	5–8	2841	2825	100.57%
9	Nunawading Spectres	26	12	14	46.15%	4–1	L1	8–5	4–9	2592	2642	98.11%
10	Newcastle Falcons	26	10	16	38.46%	1–4	L4	6–7	4–9	2782	2878	96.66%
11	Hobart Devils	26	9	17	34.62%	2–3	L1	7–6	2–11	2606	2704	96.38%
12	Perth Wildcats	26	8	18	30.77%	0–5	L5	6–7	2–11	2458	2693	91.27%
13	Melbourne Tigers	26	6	20	23.08%	1–4	L1	5–8	1–12	2822	3089	91.36%
14	St. Kilda Saints	26	5	21	19.23%	1–4	L2	3–10	2–11	2742	3053	89.81%

Updated to match(es) played on 28 September 1986. Source: NBL.com.au

The NBL tie-breaker system as outlined in the NBL Rules and Regulations states that in the case of an identical win–loss record, the results in games played between the teams will determine order of seeding.

== Playoff bracket ==
Elimination Finals
4	West Sydney Westars	86
5	Illawarra Hawks	105
3	Brisbane Bullets	100
6	Sydney Supersonics	82

Semifinals
1	Adelaide 36ers	116
5	Illawarra Hawks	92
2	Canberra Cannons	100
3	Brisbane Bullets	120

Grand Final
1	Adelaide 36ers	122	83	113
3	Brisbane Bullets	119	104	91

== Elimination Finals ==
=== (3) Brisbane Bullets vs (6) Sydney Supersonics ===
TV 0

1 October

boxscore

Brisbane Bullets 100, Sydney Supersonics 82
Scoring by quarter: 20-20, 14-6, 41-23, 22-33
Pts: Leroy Loggins 28; Rebs: Leroy Loggins 10; Asts: Cal Bruton 6	Pts: Kendal Pinder 27; Rebs: Kendal Pinder 14; Asts: Wayne Burden 4

Brisbane Entertainment Centre
Referees: Eddie Crouch, Steve Bignell

=== (4) West Sydney Westars vs (5) Illawarra Hawks ===
ABC

1 October

boxscore

West Sydney Westars 86, Illawarra Hawks 105
Scoring by quarter: 12-31, 24-24, 20-23, 30-27
Pts: Harmison, Kelley 20 each Rebs: Vince Kelley 21; Asts: Damian Keogh 6	Pts: Borner, Hammond 20 each Rebs: Don Bickett 11; Asts: Alphonse Hammond 6

State Sports Centre, Sydney
Attendance: 5,006
Referees: Ray Hunt, Bob Barnett

== Semifinals ==
=== (2) Canberra Cannons vs (3) Brisbane Bullets ===
ABC

4 October

boxscore

Canberra Cannons 100, Brisbane Bullets 120
Scoring by quarter: 30-19, 23-29, 27-36, 20-36
Pts: Simon Cottrell 25; Rebs: James Crawford 14; Asts: Phil Smyth 4	Pts: Leroy Loggins 43; Rebs: Leroy Loggins 9 Asts: Ron Radliff 3

AIS Arena, Canberra
Attendance: 5,200
Referees: Eddie Crouch, Geoff Weeks

=== (1) Adelaide 36ers vs (5) Illawarra Hawks ===
SAS 10

4 October

boxscore

Adelaide 36ers 116, Illawarra Hawks 92
Scoring by quarter: 28-14, 27-24, 36-23, 25-31
Pts: Darryl Pearce 28; Rebs: Mark Davis 14; Asts: Darryl Pearce 7	Pts: Ray Borner 28; Rebs: Ray Borner 14; Asts: McLeod, Kubank 4 each

Apollo Stadium, Adelaide
Attendance: 3,000
Referees: Ray Hunt, Bill Mildenhall

== Grand Final series ==
After the Grand Final had been the traditional single game since the league began in 1979, the NBL introduced a three-game Grand Final series for 1986. They were rewarded when not only did the series go for all three games, but in Game 1 at the Brisbane Entertainment Centre a then Australian indoor sports attendance record of 11,000 saw the game go into overtime.

=== Teams ===
==== Adelaide 36ers (1) ====
- Head coach: Ken Cole
- Assistant coach: Don Shipway

Pos.	Starter	Bench	Bench	Reserves
C	Bill Jones (c)
PF	Mark Davis	Dwayne Nelson
SF	Peter Ali		Peter Sexton	Mark Sykes
SG	Darryl Pearce	Mike McKay	Scott Ninnis
PG	Al Green	Ray Wood	David Spear

==== Brisbane Bullets (3) ====
- Head coach: Brian Kerle

Pos.	Starter	Bench	Bench	Reserves
C	John Dorge	Dave Nelson
PF	Robert Sibley	Chris McGraw
SF	Larry Sengstock (c)	Danny Morseu
SG	Leroy Loggins	Tom Gerhardt
PG	Ron Radliff	Cal Bruton

=== (1) Adelaide 36ers vs (3) Brisbane Bullets ===
==== Game 1 ====
TV 0

11 October
7:30 p.m. EST

boxscore

Brisbane Bullets 119, Adelaide 36ers 122 (OT)
Scoring by quarter: 26-24, 15-28, 32-24, 38-35, Overtime: 8-11
Pts: Leroy Loggins 38; Rebs: Larry Sengstock 8 Asts: Ron Radliff 6	Pts: Mark Davis 38; Rebs: Mark Davis 23; Asts: Mark Davis 5
Adelaide leads series, 1–0

Brisbane Entertainment Centre
Attendance: 11,000
Referees: Ray Hunt, Steve Bignell

Adelaide led early, but a series of silly turnovers saw the Bullets take a 26–24 lead at the end of the first. Leroy Loggins then struck foul trouble in the second and led by their 'Twin Towers' Mark Davis and Bill Jones, Adelaide raced out to a 52–41 half time lead. With Loggins back in the third hitting his first 6 shots, Brisbane outscored the 36ers 32–24 and the lead was cut to just 3 points. The teams went toe to toe in the last but the turning point was Bill Jones stepping in front of Loggins who was called for the charge and was out of the game with 5 fouls. However, the score was locked at 111–111 at the end of time and the game was in overtime. Cooler heads prevailed for the series favourites and after Ray Wood stole an inbound pass that killed the Bullets chances, Adelaide won 122–119. For Adelaide, Davis scored 38 points and pulled in 23 rebounds while Loggins scored 38 for the Bullets.

==== Game 2 ====
SAS 10

17 October
7:30 p.m. CST

boxscore

Adelaide 36ers 83, Brisbane Bullets 104
Scoring by quarter: 20-31, 33-23, 18-31, 12-19
Pts: Darryl Pearce 29; Rebs: Bill Jones 17; Asts: Darryl Pearce 6	Pts: Cal Bruton 38; Rebs: Leroy Loggins 11; Asts: Ron Radliff 5
Series tied, 1–1

Apollo Stadium, Adelaide
Attendance: 3,000
Referees: Ray Hunt, Eddie Crouch

Game 2 in Adelaide was expected to see the 36ers, who had gone 14–0 at home to that point of the season, warp up their first NBL title. However, the defending champions, led by 38 points from Cal Bruton, would not go quietly. An early elbow injury to Mark Davis limited his effectiveness in the game and it was left to Darryl Pearce to keep the Adelaide scoreboard ticking over. Pearce scored 29 for Adelaide including hitting six 3-pointers during the second period. However it wasn't enough as Brian Kearle's Bullets stunned the 3,000 in attendance and won the game 104–83 to not only tie the series, but to end Adelaide's 20 game winning streak at home dating back to June 1985.

==== Game 3 ====
SAS 10

19 October
2:00 p.m. CST

boxscore

Adelaide 36ers 113, Brisbane Bullets 91
Scoring by quarter: 35-25, 19-27, 26-24, 33-15
Pts: Darryl Pearce 27; Rebs: Mark Davis 25; Asts: Darryl Pearce 2	Pts: Cal Bruton 31; Rebs: Larry Sengstock 14; Asts: Leroy Loggins 5
Adelaide wins series and NBL Championship, 2–1; Grand Final MVP: Mark Davis (Adelaide)

Apollo Stadium, Adelaide
Attendance: 3,000
Referees: Ray Hunt, Eddie Crouch

Game 3 at the Apollo Stadium was a back and forth affair. The 36ers jumped out early and led 35–25 at the end of the first, while Brisbane hit back in the second and, coming from 16 points down to actually lead at one point, and were only down by 2 at the half. The third period saw Leroy Loggins, frustrated by the close, physical defence of Peter Ali, Dwayne Nelson and Mike McKay, foul out for the second time in the series. Despite 31 points from Cal Bruton, 22 from Ron Radliff and 14 rebounds from captain Larry Sengstock, Adelaide, led by Pearce with 27 points, Davis and Al Green with 22 points, and Davis and Jones with 25 and 13 rebounds respectively, had all the answers in the last to run away with the game 113–91 to win their first NBL Championship.

36ers Power forward Mark Davis, who averaged 24.3 points, 19.3 rebounds and 1.6 assists over the 3 games was named the Most Valuable Player for the Grand Final series.

== See also ==
- 1986 NBL season
