= Mark Davis (basketball, born 1960) =

American-Australian basketball player

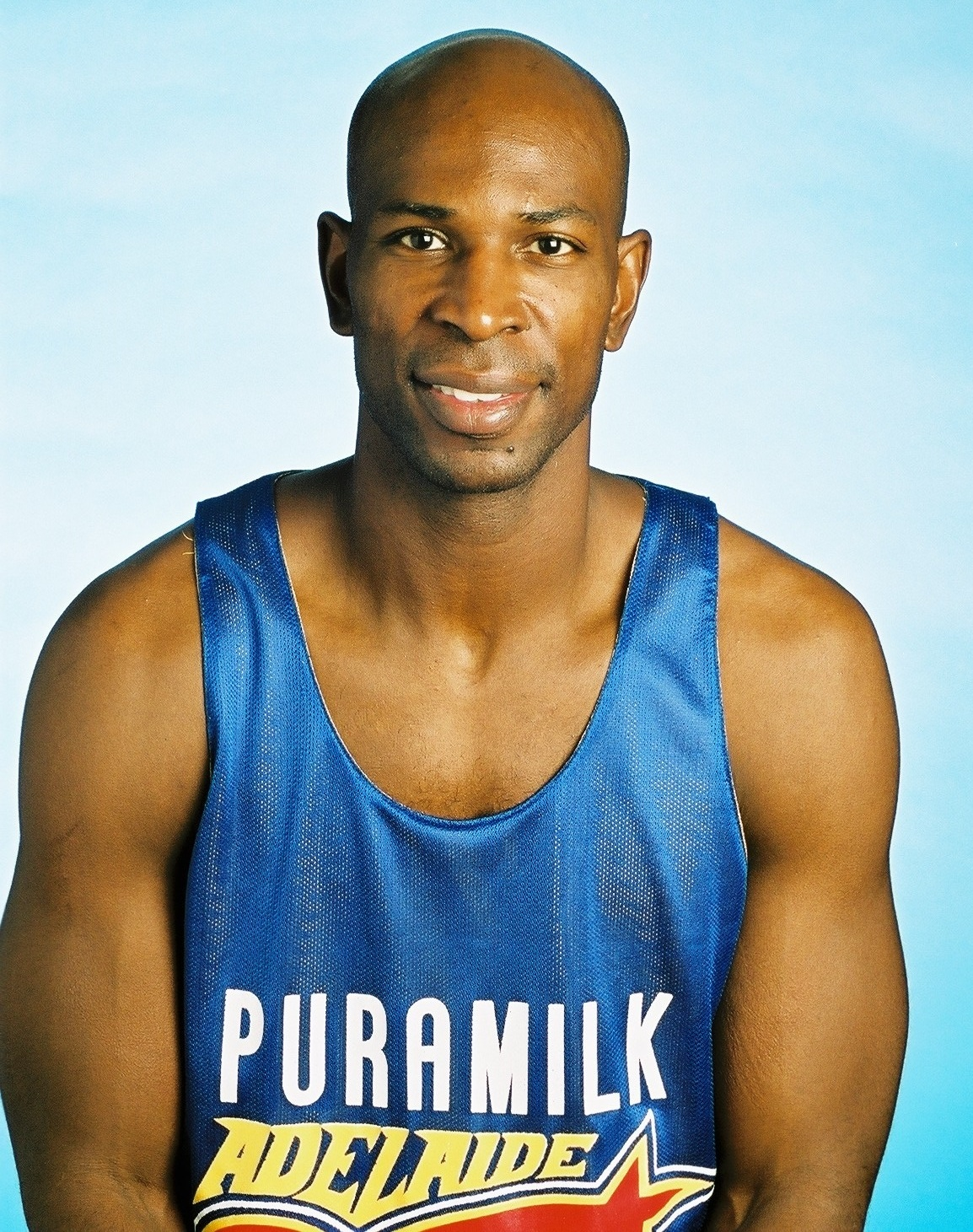

Personal information
- Born: 23 December 1960 (age 65) Philadelphia, Pennsylvania, U.S.
- Listed height: 202 cm (6 ft 8 in)
- Listed weight: 95 kg (209 lb)

Career information
- College: St. Augustine's (1981–1983)
- NBA draft: 1983: undrafted
- Playing career: 1984–2002
- Position: Power forward

Career history
- 1984: Hamilton
- 1984–1985: Dorados de Chihuahua
- 1985–2002: South Adelaide Panthers
- 1985–2001: Adelaide 36ers
- 1987: Long Island Knights

Career highlights
- 3× NBL champion (1986, 1998, 1999); NBL Grand Final MVP (1986); NBL Most Valuable Player (1987); 8× NBL All-Star (1988–1995); NBL All-Star Game MVP (1991); 5× All-NBL First Team (1986–1989, 1991); 4× NBL rebounding champion (1985–1987, 1993); No. 33 retired by Adelaide 36ers; 5× SA State League champion (1987, 1989, 1991, 1995, 1997); 5× Woollacott Medalist (1986–1989, 1992); CIMEBA champion (1985); NZNBL rebounding champion (1984)

Mark Anthony Davis (born 23 December 1960) is an American-Australian former professional basketball player. He most notably played in the National Basketball League for the Adelaide 36ers between 1985 and 2001, gaining the nickname of "The Chairman of the Boards" for his record-breaking rebounding achievements.

Born in Philadelphia, Pennsylvania, Davis became an Australian citizen in 1992.

== College career ==
Davis spent two seasons with the St. Augustine's Falcons. In his senior season in 1982–83, he averaged 20.5 points per game.

== Professional career ==
Davis' first professional gig came in 1984, playing for Hamilton in the New Zealand NBL. There, he was named rebounding champion. He then spent the 1984–85 season playing in Mexico for Dorados de Chihuahua where he helped the team win the championship.

In 1985, Davis moved to Adelaide where he joined both the South Adelaide Panthers of the SA State League. According to long time 36ers and Panthers teammate Scott Ninnis, Davis was actually the Panthers 2nd choice and was only recruited to the club after 6 ft 9 in (206 cm) American centre Bill Coon left after just 4 days in Adelaide.

Davis then came to the attention of 36ers' coach Ken Cole after dominating performances for the Panthers. Davis was signed by the 36ers five games into the 1985 NBL season and made an immediate impact, forming the league's leading front-court combination with Peter Ali and fellow import Bill Jones. Davis made his NBL debut for Adelaide on 4 May 1985 in a Round 4 clash with the Bankstown Bruins at the Apollo Stadium in Adelaide. He showed he would be a player to be reckoned with by top scoring for the home side with 32 points while grabbing 14 rebounds in a 117–110 Adelaide win. Davis won the club's MVP award after averaging 27.9 points, 17.6 rebounds, 1.2 assists and 1.3 steals per game. He scored a season-high 42 points (which would remain the 36ers single game record until beaten by Darryl Pearce with a 48-point game in 1988) in Adelaide's 144–112 win over St Kilda in Melbourne, while his season-high rebound game was again at home against the Canberra Cannons when he pulled down 29 boards, just two shy of the 36ers record of 31 held by Dan Clausen. The 36ers, including guards Al Green, Darryl Pearce and Mike McKay, made its first Grand Final appearance that season against the Brisbane Bullets but did not win.

By the start of the 1986 NBL season, Davis was already regarded as the premier power forward in the country, and with a team leading 25.3 points and 16.1 rebounds per game, led the 36ers to their second straight Grand Final in 1986 on a back of a 24–2 record (including going 13–0 at the Apollo Stadium). Davis went on to lead the 36ers to the championship in three games over the Bullets in the NBL's inaugural Grand Final series, winning the NBL's inaugural Grand Final MVP award in the process. Although he was a power forward, Davis was named at centre in the All-NBL First Team for 1986 – the first of 5 times he was named to the All NBL team.

Following the 36ers championship win over Brisbane, Davis spent the off-season playing for the Long Island Knights in the United States Basketball League (USBL) before returning to Adelaide for the start of the 1987 NBL season. Davis' great form continued in 1987 and he was rewarded when he was named joint NBL Most Valuable Player with Brisbane's Leroy Loggins, while also gaining All-NBL First Team honours. Davis averaged 26.1 points and 17.5 rebounds in his MVP season and 1987 saw the 36ers finish the regular season in first place, but the defending champions were upset in a three-game semi-final series against the emerging Perth Wildcats. The season was also the first year that Davis led the league in total rebounding – an achievement he would repeat in 1992 and would lead to his nickname "Chairman of the Boards".

In 1990, Davis was named captain of the 36ers by new coach (and long time 36ers assistant coach) Don Shipway. 1990 would also be the first time since 1983 that the 36ers would miss the NBL Finals. With Davis leading the way, along with new point guard Butch Hays, 6 ft 10 in (208 cm) centres Mark Bradtke and Brett Wheeler and guards Darryl Pearce and Mike McKay, the 36ers returned to the playoffs in 1991 but were bundled out in the Semi-finals by the Perth Wildcats.

The 36ers won a place in the 1994 Grand Final series against the North Melbourne Giants, though Davis' impact was limited after suffering a dislocated shoulder in Game 1 of Adelaide's Semi-finals series sweep of the reigning NBL champion Melbourne Tigers. In the 3rd period of the game, Davis had grabbed a defensive rebound and as he prepared to throw a long pass for a fast break, Tigers forward Dave Simmons attempted to swat the ball away but collected his right arm instead, instantly dislocating his shoulder. With the team missing his scoring and rebounding (he averaged 21.7 points and 12.9 rebounds in the regular season and had averaged 16.5 points and 11.3 rebounds in the playoffs), the 36ers produced a hard-fought win in Game 2 in Melbourne. Davis underwent intense physio treatment in order to be ready for the Grand Final series against the Giants and did return to the side for the series, but ultimately the 36ers were swept in two games. 1994 would also be the first time that the name Mark Davis would not appear on the club's MVP award as new recruit (and the reigning NBL MVP from 1993) Robert Rose won the award. To that point Davis had won every 36ers Club MVP award since 1985.

Davis remained captain of the 36ers until the end of 1996 when he was replaced by Australian Boomers representative Brett Maher. He went on to win two more NBL championships (now as a sixth man) in 1998 and 1998–99. On 13 December 1999, in a 90–74 win over the Brisbane Bullets, Davis grabbed his 5,000th NBL rebound, becoming the first NBL player to reach the mark. Davis' rebounding record of 5,200 was broken by former 36ers teammate Mark Bradtke on 21 November 2003 in Adelaide, with Davis on hand to present Bradtke with the match ball.

Davis is the 36ers' all-time leader in free throws made (2,037), free throws attempted (2,888), rebounds (5,200), and blocked shots (301).

Davis also continued to play for the South Adelaide Panthers during his time with the 36ers. He won five championships with the Panthers and a record five Woollacott Medals.

== National team career ==
After becoming an Australian citizen in 1992 and serving the FIBA required 3-year residency period, Davis was selected to play for the Australian Boomers in 1995, playing in the opening three games of a five-game series against the Magic Johnson All-Stars. Davis made his Boomers debut at home in Adelaide against the All-Stars on 7 March 1995.

== Retirement and basketball camp ==
Davis continues to call Adelaide home following his retirement and started up the "Mark Davis Basketball Camp" in 2004. Davis himself gives expert coaching with help from various past and present NBL/NBA players including Willie Simmons and Butch Hays, as well as personnel from the Adelaide Lightning and various Paralympians.

== Honours and Accolades ==
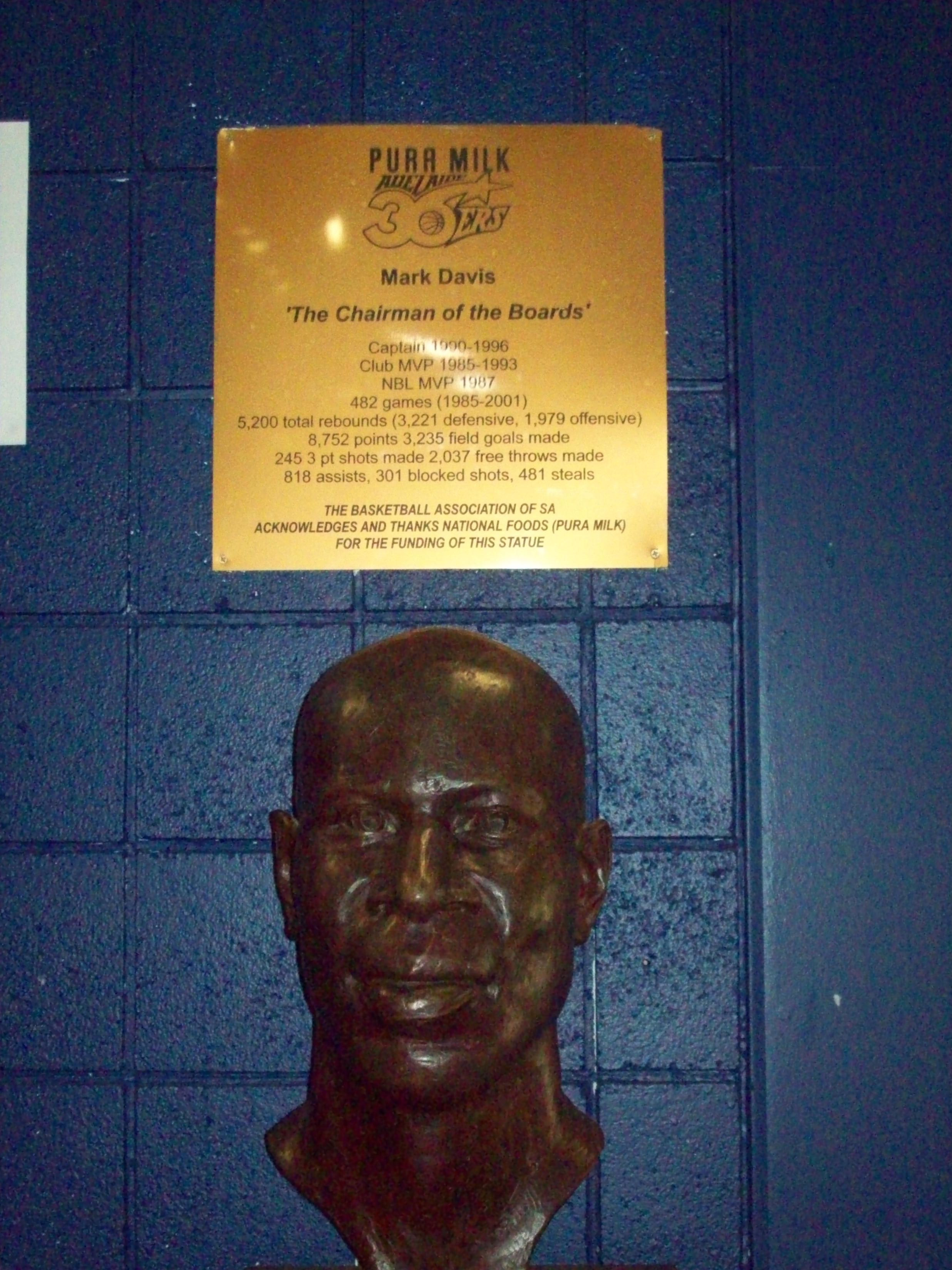
Bronze bust of Mark Davis on display at the Titanium Security Arena, home of the Adelaide 36ers.

Davis is honoured as one of only five players to have their number retired by the Adelaide 36ers. His #33 jersey hangs in the rafters of the Adelaide Entertainment Centre, alongside #4 Darryl Pearce, #5 Brett Maher #15 Al Green, and #21 Daniel Johnson. Maher, who replaced Davis as 36ers captain in 1997 when Davis' career was winding down and his role changed from being a starter to the team's sixth man, also played his entire NBL career with the Adelaide 36ers. Just inside the main entrance to the Adelaide Arena, a bronze bust of Davis sits in place underneath a plaque giving a bio of Davis' achievements with the 36ers (pictured right).

The Adelaide 36ers club MVP award is named the Mark Davis Trophy in his honour. Davis was the first winner of the award in 1985 and won the award nine times conclusively up to and including 1993. Davis is also the only 36ers player to have won the NBL's MVP award. Davis (1986, 1998 and 1999), Brett Maher, Paul Rees, Rupert Sapwell and Jason Williams (all 1998, 1999 and 2002) are the only players to have won three or more NBL championships with the 36ers, while Davis (1986), Kevin Brooks (1998) and Brett Maher (1999 and 2002) are the only 36ers to win the Grand Final MVP award. Davis was also named in the NBL's 20th Anniversary Team in 1998 and its 25th Anniversary Team in 2003.

Davis was inducted into the Australian Basketball Hall of Fame in 2006 for his services to the NBL.

The chairman of the boards! I just marvelled at him and his offensive abilities off the glass. Throughout his time with the Adelaide 36ers, sometimes their best offence was the second shot, because they could just throw it up there and they had Mark Davis to go and get it. The thing about it, is that he was a big guy and a really good athlete, but he wasn't tall for someone who was so prolific on the boards. Just another one who came in a generation where he was setting the tone for others, and he was just an incredible competitor who did some tremendous things.

— Australian basketball legend Andrew Gaze talking about Mark Davis in 2015.

In March 2015, Davis' #33 was also retired by his local Adelaide club, the South Adelaide Panthers who he joined in 1985 and with whom he won the SA State League championship in 1987, 1989, 1991, 1995 and 1997 as winning a record 5 Woollacott Medals as the fairest and most brilliant player in South Australia. His number was retired along with the #8 of fellow Australian Basketball Hall of Fame member Michael Ah Matt, and the #9 of long time 36ers and Panthers championship winning teammate Scott Ninnis.

In November 2015 in an online poll conducted by Adelaide's daily newspaper The Advertiser, Davis was selected at Power forward in the fans choice for the Adelaide 36ers best ever team. Davis polled the most votes from the fans (83.28%) for any position. The fans choice team was Mark Bradtke (centre), Davis (PF), Robert Rose (Small forward), Brett Maher (shooting guard) and Darnell Mee (Point guard), Phil Smyth (coach).

== NBL career stats ==
Games:	482
Rebounds:	5,200 (3,221 def; 1,979 off – 10.8 pg – All-time 2nd)
Points:	8,752 (18.2 pg)
Free Throws:	2,037 / 2,888 (70.5%)
Field goals:	3,235 / 6,664 (48.5%)
3 Points:	245 / 791 (31.0%)
Steals:	481 (1.0 pg)
Assists:	818 (1.7 pg)
Blocked Shots:	301 (0.6 pg)
