= Darryl Pearce =

Australian basketball player (1960–2025)

Personal information
- Born: 15 October 1960 Adelaide, South Australia, Australia
- Died: 12 January 2025 (aged 64) Melbourne, Victoria, Australia
- Listed height: 191 cm (6 ft 3 in)
- Listed weight: 87 kg (192 lb)

Career information
- Playing career: 1982–1995
- Position: Shooting guard
- Number: 6, 4

Career history
- 1982–1991: Adelaide City Eagles / 36ers
- 1992–1995: North Melbourne Giants

Career highlights
- 2× NBL champion (1986, 1994); NBL All Star (1990); No. 4 retired by Adelaide 36ers

Darryl John Pearce (15 October 1960 – 12 January 2025) was an Australian professional basketball player. Nicknamed "The Iceman", Pearce played in the National Basketball League (NBL) for the Adelaide 36ers from 1982 to 1991 before playing four seasons (1992–1995) with the North Melbourne Giants. He was a renowned three-point field goal shooter, having shot at 41.9% from beyond the arc during his 374-game NBL career.

== Career ==
=== Adelaide 36ers ===
Pearce was born in Adelaide, South Australia, and was a member of junior South Australian teams in the late 1970s and early 1980s. The Adelaide 36ers were formed for the 1982 NBL season (as the Adelaide City Eagles) with Pearce one of the first guards signed by the club. He made his NBL debut on 6 February 1982 in Adelaide's 87–84 loss to the Coburg Giants at Adelaide's Apollo Stadium. Pearce scored 14 points and collected 4 rebounds on debut for the new club. He would go on to average 15.9 points, 2.7 rebounds and 2.0 assists in his first season.

The club changed its name to the Adelaide 36ers from the 1983 NBL season, though the club failed to make the playoffs until 1984 where they were defeated in the Elimination Finals by the Nunawading Spectres. By this time "The Iceman" had cemented his place as one of the premier shooting guards in the league.

Following the 1984 season, Adelaide's "other" team, the 1982 champion West Adelaide Bearcats, pulled out of the NBL and a number of their star players including 1982 season MVP Al Green, Australian boomers representatives Peter Ali and Ray Wood, and young gun Mike McKay, moved across to play for the 36ers.

Former Australian Boomer and 1964 Olympic representative Ken Cole was signed as coach of the Adelaide 36ers for the 1985 NBL season. Under Cole, the 36ers became one of the league's premier teams. Also joining the 36ers was 6 ft 9 in (206 cm) centre Bill Jones, and 6 ft 7 in (201 cm) rebounding Power forward Mark Davis. Adelaide went on to a 20–6 record and second on the regular season ladder behind the Brisbane Bullets. The team had a bye going into the semi-final where they easily defeated the Newcastle Falcons 151–103 at home in what is still a record semi-final win in the NBL. In the last single game NBL grand final ever played, Adelaide were up against the Brisbane Bullets on the Bullets' home court (Sleeman Sports Centre). Going into the final period the game the Bullets' were leading 78–74 but a 42–21 last period in favour of the home team saw Adelaide fail to win their first grand final going down 95–120.

Statistically Pearce enjoyed his best ever NBL season in 1985, averaging 22.8 points, 2.9 rebounds and 4.6 assists. With Green and Pearce, the 36ers had what many believed to be the league's best guard combination despite both being natural shooting guards. Cole successfully chose to leave Pearce at SG (primarily due to his better outside shooting) and move Green to play Point guard. Green jokingly later told that he "hated" Pearce for being forced to play the point, but added seriously that he would play alongside him any day because he is "a true winner".

Pearce and the 36ers won their first NBL championship in 1986, defeating the Brisbane Bullets 2–1 in the NBL's first ever three game Grand Final series. The Iceman averaged 19.3 points, 3.1 rebounds and 3.9 assists for the season while averaging 23.0 points, 4.0 rebounds and 4.0 assists in the GF series.

While Adelaide, now under the coaching of Gary Fox, was still at the top of the league in 1987 and 1988, they were unable to progress past the Semi-finals in both seasons. Pearce averaged 20.6 points in both seasons. In Round 2 of the 1988 season against the Ken Cole coached Newcastle Falcons in Newcastle, Pearce set two Adelaide 36ers records that still stand as of the 2014–15 NBL season. He set the 36ers single game scoring record with 48 points and also set the record for most three-pointers made when he hit 11/14 from outside the arc with only Brett Maher able to match his 3-point record when he hit 11/12 in a game against Brisbane in 1996.

The team slipped to 6th place in 1989 in Fox's last year as coach before missing the playoffs for the first time in seven years by finishing 9th in 1990 under new coach and long time team assistant Don Shipway. Despite Adelaide missing the playoffs in 1990, Pearce was selected to his only NBL All Star Game played at the Perth Entertainment Centre.

The club was back in the Semi-finals in 1991, but once again fell short, losing the Semis to defending champions the Perth Wildcats. 1991 would prove to be Pearce's last as a 36ers player and before the 1992 NBL season he was released by the club and would join the North Melbourne Giants.

Pearce played 258 NBL games for the Adelaide 36ers.

=== North Melbourne Giants ===
Pearce joined North Melbourne for the 1992 season, with his first game for the club being against Adelaide at the 36ers new home, the 8,000 seat Clipsal Powerhouse. He scored 8 points, 4 rebounds and 4 assists for the Giants, though they were beaten 106–84. Despite their poor start, the Giants would make the Semi-finals in 1992 where they were defeated in two games by the South East Melbourne Magic.

After being eliminated in the 1993 Quarter finals by the Perth Wildcats, the Giants bounced back in 1994 to win their second NBL championship after defeating Pearce's former club Adelaide 2–0 in the Grand Final series.

Pearce's last season in the NBL came in 1995. He announced his retirement after the Giants lost the Grand Final series to the Wildcats.

== National team ==
Pearce played numerous games for the Australian Boomers throughout his career. He represented Australia in the 1986 FIBA World Championship in Spain, as well as at the 1988 Summer Olympics in Seoul, South Korea.

== Personal life and death ==
As of 2016, Pearce worked as a financial planner and lived in Melbourne. He died there on 12 January 2025, at the age of 64.

== Accolades ==
Pearce was inducted into the Australian Basketball Hall of Fame in 2002. In his 14 seasons playing in the NBL, Pearce only missed playing the Finals on three occasions - 1982, 1983 and 1990. He played in 4 Grand Finals (1985, 1986, 1994, 1995) including the last single game Grand Final (1985) and the first Championship Series (1986), winning the title in 1986 with Adelaide and 1994 with North Melbourne.

On 14 November 2015, the Adelaide 36ers formally retired the No. 4 worn by Pearce as well as the No. 15 of his long time guard partner Al Green. The numbers joined the No. 5 of Brett Maher and the No. 33 of their 1986 championship teammate Mark Davis hanging from the rafters of the Adelaide Entertainment Centre.

== NBL career stats ==
Legend
GP	Games played	GS	Games started	MPG	Minutes per game
FG%	Field goal percentage	3P%	3-point field goal percentage	FT%	Free throw percentage
RPG	Rebounds per game	APG	Assists per game	SPG	Steals per game
BPG	Blocks per game	PPG	Points per game	**Bold**	Career high

†	Denotes season(s) in which Pearce won an NBL championship

Year	Team	GP	GS	MPG	FG%	3P%	FT%	RPG	APG	SPG	BPG	PPG
1982*	Adelaide City Eagles	26	26	NA	.514	NA	.761	2.7	2.0	NA	NA	15.6
1983*	Adelaide 36ers	22	22	NA	**.516**	NA	.750	1.7	2.1	1.0	0.0	15.8
1984	Adelaide 36ers	24	24	NA	.469	.440	.809	**3.1**	3.5	0.8	0.4	**26.0**
1985	Adelaide 36ers	28	28	NA	.443	**.454**	.761	2.9	4.6	1.2	**0.5**	22.8
1986†	Adelaide 36ers	29	**29**	NA	.410	.388	.828	3.1	3.9	1.0	0.2	19.3
1987	Adelaide 36ers	21	21	33.3	.485	.444	.757	2.1	2.4	0.9	**0.5**	20.6
1988	Adelaide 36ers	26	26	**37.4**	.457	.411	.833	2.5	4.9	1.1	0.2	20.6
1989	Adelaide 36ers	27	27	35.8	.409	.344	**.893**	2.5	4.2	**1.2**	0.2	15.2
1990	Adelaide 36ers	26	26	33.9	.434	.447	.841	2.5	**5.4**	**1.2**	**0.5**	16.9
1991	Adelaide 36ers	29	**29**	24.8	.455	.446	.836	1.5	2.8	0.8	0.1	16.0
1992	North Melbourne Giants	28	NA	20.3	.437	.366	.852	1.3	1.3	0.9	0.0	8.6
1993	North Melbourne Giants	29	NA	30.6	.412	.402	.655	2.1	3.7	**1.2**	0.3	11.6
1994†	North Melbourne Giants	**30**	NA	15.4	.464	.441	.692	1.3	1.5	0.7	0.0	8.0
1995	North Melbourne Giants	29	NA	12.3	.435	.433	.667	0.8	1.2	0.6	0.2	5.7
**Career**		374	NA	NA	.453	.419	.797	2.1	3.2	0.9	0.2	15.6

* The NBL only introduced the 3-point line in 1984 thus there is no 3-point field goal percentage for 1982 and 1983.
