= Mike Wells (basketball) =

American basketball coach

Ohio State Buckeyes
- Position: Assistant coach
- League: Big Ten Conference

Career information
- High school: Mount Vernon (Mount Vernon, Ohio)
- College: Mount Vernon Nazarene (1991–1993)
- Coaching career: 1993–present

Career history

Coaching
- 1993–1994: Mount Vernon Nazarene (assistant)
- 1999–2004: Houston Rockets (assistant)
- 2004–2005: Los Angeles Lakers (assistant)
- 2005–2009: San Antonio Spurs (assistant)
- 2009–2011: Washington Wizards (assistant)
- 2011–2013: George Mason (assistant)
- 2013–2014: South Florida (assistant)
- 2014–2022: Utah Jazz (assistant)
- 2023–2024: Charlotte Hornets (assistant)
- 2024–2026: Adelaide 36ers
- 2026–present: Ohio State (assistant)

Mike Wells is an American professional basketball coach who is an assistant coach for the Ohio State Buckeyes of the Big Ten Conference. He was involved in the National Basketball Association (NBA) system as an assistant coach from 1994 to 2024 with the Houston Rockets, Los Angeles Lakers, San Antonio Spurs, Washington Wizards, Utah Jazz and Charlotte Hornets. Wells was the head coach for the Adelaide 36ers of the Australian National Basketball League (NBL) from 2024 to 2026.

== Early life ==
Wells was raised in Mount Vernon, Ohio, and attended Mount Vernon High School.

== College career ==
Wells played two seasons of college basketball for Mount Vernon Nazarene University, graduating in 1993. During that time, he earned a degree in sports management. His basketball coach, Scott Flemming, encouraged Wells to pursue a career in coaching.

== Coaching career ==
After graduating, Wells continued with the Mount Vernon Nazarene Cougars as an assistant coach while at the same time attending the United States Sports Academy. During this time, he earned his master's degree in sports science. He wrote letters to all of the teams in the National Basketball Association (NBA) and National Football League (NFL) which led to an internship offer from the Houston Rockets.

Wells' career began with the Rockets in 1994, where he started as an intern and assistant video coordinator. He was a member of the coaching staff when the Rockets won the NBA championship in 1995. He was promoted to video coordinator in 1996. He became a full-time assistant coach during the summer of 1999 and overall his stint with the Rockets spanned 10 seasons. He also worked as the head scout for Team USA from 1998 to 2003.

After a season as an assistant with the Los Angeles Lakers in 2004–05, Wells served as an assistant for the San Antonio Spurs between 2005 and 2009. The Spurs won an NBA championship in 2007. Between 2009 and 2011, he served as an assistant for the Washington Wizards.

Wells had three years at the college level between 2011 and 2014, serving as an assistant coach for George Mason (2011–13) and South Florida (2013–14).

In April 2014, Wells was hired as an assistant coach for the Toledo Rockets. However, in June 2014, he joined the Utah Jazz as an assistant coach under head coach Quin Snyder.

Wells spent eight seasons with the Jazz, the last coming in 2021–22. His final three seasons with the Jazz saw him serve in a dual role of Director of Basketball Operations.

Wells served as an assistant coach with USA Basketball in three of the six qualifying windows for the 2023 FIBA Basketball World Cup.

For the 2023–24 NBA season, Wells joined the Charlotte Hornets as an assistant coach.

In June 2024, Wells joined the Adelaide 36ers of the Australian National Basketball League (NBL) as lead assistant coach for the 2024–25 season. On August 12, 2024, the 36ers elevated Wells to the position of head coach after sacking Scott Ninnis. He led Adelaide back into the finals for the first time in seven years.

In the 2025–26 NBL season, Wells guided the 36ers to 27 wins from 41 games, the club's best regular season since 1986. The team reached the final of the inaugural Ignite Cup and he led the 36ers to the NBL Championship Series, where they finished runners-up following a 3–2 series loss to the Sydney Kings. On May 6, 2026, he stepped down as head coach of the 36ers.

On May 13, 2026, Wells was hired as an assistant coach for the Ohio State Buckeyes under head coach Jake Diebler.

== Personal life ==
Wells' wife, Kerri Cronk, worked as a television anchor in Utah for 30 years. They each have two sons from previous relationships.
