= Bill Jones (basketball, born 1958) =

American-Australian basketball player

Personal information
- Born: 26 September 1958 (age 68) Joliet, Illinois, U.S.
- Listed height: 209 cm (6 ft 10 in)
- Listed weight: 92 kg (203 lb)

Career information
- High school: Joliet Central (Joliet, Illinois)
- College: Northern Iowa (1977–1981)
- NBA draft: 1981: undrafted
- Playing career: 1985–1992
- Position: Centre
- Number: 14

Career history
- 1985–1988: Adelaide 36ers
- 1989: Newcastle Falcons
- 1992: Geelong Supercats
- 1992: Bayside Blues
- 1993–1994: Gippsland Lakers

Career highlights
- NBL champion (1986)

William Lawrence Jones (born September 26, 1958) is an American-Australian former professional basketball player. He played the majority of his professional career in Australia's National Basketball League (NBL) from 1985 until 1992.

== Early life ==
Bill Jones, a 6-foot-10-inch (208 cm) centre, was born and raised in Joliet, Illinois and attended Joliet Central High School where he was named to the All-Conference team and received an All-State honorable mention. After graduating in 1976, Jones attended the University of Northern Iowa from 1977 to 1981. Jones entered into the 1981 NBA Draft, but went undrafted.

== Professional career ==
In 1985, Jones was signed by the Adelaide 36ers in Australia's National Basketball League where he played as an import player (from 1979 to 2015, NBL teams, with the exception of the New Zealand Breakers, were restricted to no more than 2 non-Australian players at a time). Quickly becoming the starting centre for the team (and easily its tallest player), Jones formed part of the league's best front court with former St. Augustine's Falcons Power forward, 6 ft 7 in (201 cm) Mark Davis. Along with other stars including guards Al Green (a naturalised Australian born in The Bronx) and Darryl Pearce, 1980 Australian Olympics representative Peter Ali (the team captain), and the NBL's 1985 Rookie of the Year Mike McKay, the Ken Cole coached team made it through to the single game NBL Grand Final that year, but went down 121–95 to the Brisbane Bullets. During the year Jones averaged 13.3 points, 10.6 rebounds and 2.6 blocks in 28 games.

For 1986, Ken Cole made Jones the captain of the 36ers. In 1985 Jones had fouled out in a number of games and Cole's motivation behind making him the captain was that hopefully he would cut the cheap fouls out of his game. The ploy worked and Jones went on to have his best season in Australia, averaging 19.1 points, 13.4 rebounds and 2.2 blocks per game over 30 games, shooting an NBL career high 31 points in the final regular season game against the Melbourne Tigers. The 36ers themselves enjoyed a golden year with the team going through the season with a 24–2 record, including going 13–0 on their home court, the 3,000 seat Apollo Stadium, earning them the nickname "The Invincibles". The two losses for the 36ers literally came from last second shots meaning that they were only seconds away from a perfect season, while against Geelong late in the season Jones saved Adelaide from a home loss when in the last second of the game he tip-dunked a missed 3 point attempt from Darryl Pearce to give Adelaide a 120–119 win. Going into the playoffs, the 36ers were overwhelming favourites to win their maiden championship having finished 5 games clear of the second placed Canberra Cannons. The team easily overcame the Illawarra Hawks 116–92 in their single game home Semi-final before again facing the Brisbane Bullets (who had come from behind to beat Canberra in their semi-final clash) in the now best of 3 game Grand Final series.

In the opening game at the Brisbane Entertainment Centre in front of a then record indoor sports attendance in Australia of 11,000 fans, Jones led from the front for the 36ers with 30 points, 17 rebounds and 3 blocks as the 36ers won 122–119 in overtime (eventual series MVP Mark Davis had 38 pts, 23 boards and 5 assists). In a pivotal moment late in regulation time, Jones had pulled off the play of the game for his team when he stepped in front of Bullet's kingpin Leroy Loggins (the 1986 league MVP) and took a charge for what was Loggins' 5th foul (in the NBL at the time players were only allowed 5 fouls). A week later back in Adelaide where the 36ers had been the first team to go through a regular season undefeated at home, the 36ers were expected to wrap up the series, but were stunned by the Bullets who refused to go quietly and pulled off a 104–89 win. Jones and the 36ers would not be denied though, winning Game 3 and the series 113–91 at home. Over the series, Jones averaged 19.6 points, 15.6 rebounds and 3 blocks per game.

During his time with the 36ers (which at the time was a semi-professional league with most players still having day jobs), Jones and Mark Davis worked as security at the Adelaide Casino, with Davis later joking that because of their height, their uniforms were too short making them look like Urkel, but that they had very little trouble from casino patrons as they "towered over everybody back then". While in Adelaide, Jones also formed a close bond with the 'Brothers' (as they called themselves) in the 36ers squad. The Brothers being African-American players Jones, Davis and naturalised Australian's Al Green and Dwayne Nelson.

With Ken Cole having been controversially sacked at the end of 1986, Adelaide had a new coach in Gary Fox. Although the team (which was largely intact from 1986) still finished 2nd on the ladder and were still the title favourites in 1987. However, they were upset 2–1 in their semi-final series against the Perth Wildcats and failed to make their 3rd straight Grand Final. 1988 would be more of the same for the 36ers, but Jones wouldn't be the team captain as Fox had taken that from him and given it to Darryl Pearce and Peter Ali. They again finished on top of the ladder at the end of the regular season but again faltered in the semi-finals, this time being swept by the eventual champion Canberra Cannons.

1988 had seen the emergence of 6 ft 10 in (208 cm) centre Mark Bradtke with the 36ers and at the end of the season coach Fox told the then 30 year old Jones that he would not be required in 1989. Jones then linked with former coach Ken Cole at the Newcastle Falcons for the year, playing 24 games for the club.

When Cole left the Falcons at the end of 1989, Jones left as well and played for two years in Central and South America before returning to Australia in 1992 where he played 2 games for the Geelong Supercats in the NBL as well as playing for the Bayside Blues in Melbourne as well as the Gippsland Lakers before retiring from playing in 1994.

Bill Jones played 139 NBL games from 1985 to 1992, averaging 16.0 points, 11.5 rebounds and 2.0 blocked shots per game. Although at only 6'9" he wasn't the tallest centre (many centre opponents in the NBL were around 1-3 inches taller), Jones' jumping ability and 7 ft 0 in (213 cm) wingspan made him a noted shot blocker.

== Current ==
Bill Jones currently lives in Melbourne, Australia where he is the Project Manager for Australian Unity. Since his retirement from basketball, Jones has also taken up Roller hockey and he counts the 1986 NBL Championship win with the Adelaide 36ers as his career highlight.

== Honour roll ==
NBL career:	1985–1989, 1992
NBL Grand Final appearances:	2 (1985, 1986)
NBL Championships:	1 (1986)
NBL Finals appearances:	4 (1985, 1986, 1987, 1988)

== NBL career stats ==
Legend
GP	Games played	GS	Games started	MPG	Minutes per game
FG%	Field goal percentage	3P%	3-point field goal percentage	FT%	Free throw percentage
RPG	Rebounds per game	APG	Assists per game	SPG	Steals per game
BPG	Blocks per game	PPG	Points per game	**Bold**	Career high

†	Denotes season(s) in which Jones won an NBL championship

Year	Team	GP	GS	MPG	FG%	3P%	FT%	RPG	APG	SPG	BPG	PPG
1985	Adelaide 36ers	28	28	NA	.548	.000	.625	10.6	1.2	1.1	**2.6**	13.3
1986†	Adelaide 36ers	**30**	**30**	NA	**.560**	.000	.598	**13.4**	0.9	1.2	2.2	**19.1**
1987	Adelaide 36ers	29	29	34.5	.469	.000	.674	10.4	**1.6**	1.1	2.2	14.3
1988	Adelaide 36ers	26	26	34.9	.548	.000	.609	10.2	1.3	1.1	1.6	15.7
1989	Newcastle Falcons	24	24	39.3	.499	.000	.730	13.3	**1.6**	**1.6**	1.5	18.3
1992	Geelong Supercats	2	2	29.7	.412	.000	**1.000**	8.5	1.5	0.5	0.5	7.5
**Career**		139	139	NA	.524	.000	.649	11.5	1.3	1.2	2.0	16.0
