= Ron Radliff =

Australian basketball player

Personal information
- Born: 1958 (age 67–68) Enumclaw, Washington
- Listed height: 184 cm (6 ft 0 in)
- Listed weight: 75 kg (165 lb)

Career information
- High school: Enumclaw (Enumclaw, Washington)
- College: Western Washington (1976–1980)
- NBA draft: 1980: undrafted
- Playing career: 1983–1992
- Position: Point guard
- Number: 22

Career history
- 1983–1989: Brisbane Bullets
- 1990–1992: Gold Coast Cougars/Rollers

Career highlights
- 2x NBL champion (1985, 1987)

Ron Radliff (born 1958) is a former professional basketball player who played in the Australian National Basketball League between 1983 and 1992. He won the NBL Championship with the Brisbane Bullets in 1985 and 1987 before finishing his career as part of the Gold Coast Rollers. Radliff is a naturalised Australian citizen.

Radliff, more commonly known as The Rat, was born and raised in Enumclaw, Washington. He graduated from Enumclaw Senior High School in Washington State in 1976. He then attended and graduated from Western Washington University.

== Career ==
Ronnie The Rat landed in Australia in 1983 as an import point guard for NBL team the Brisbane Bullets. Standing 6 ft 0 in (183 cm), Radliff was known for his long curly hair and his brilliant outside shooting, though he was also a tenacious defender who never gave opponents an inch. Radliff spent six seasons with the Bullets under the successful coaching of Brian Kerle. As teammate to future NBL Hall of Famers Larry Sengstock, Cal Bruton, Leroy Loggins and Danny Morseu, The Rat helped the team to win its first NBL Championship in 1985 against the Adelaide 36ers, and again in 1987 against the Perth Wildcats. During his time in Brisbane Radliff also helped the team to the 1984 Grand Final against the Canberra Cannons and the 1986 GF against the 36ers. 1986 was the first time the NBL used a 3-game series instead of a single championship game.

Radliff left Brisbane after they failed to make the playoffs in 1989 and joined the newly formed Gold Coast Cougars in 1990 (ironically Brisbane would make the NBL Grand Final in 1990, going down to Perth in three games). After three seasons on the Gold Coast, Radliff retired after the 1992 NBL season.

Ron Radliff currently sits equal 4th on the NBL All-time 3pt% list having hit 43.5% from outside the arc during his NBL career.

== Coaching ==
Radliff was an assistant coach of the Gold Coast Blaze who played in the NBL from its inception in 2007 until the club pulled out of the league at the end of the 2011-12 season.

== Honour roll ==
NBL career:	1983–1992
NBL Grand Final appearances:	4 (1984, 1985, 1986, 1987)
NBL Championships:	2 (1985, 1987)
NBL Finals appearances:	5 (1984, 1985, 1986, 1987, 1988)

== NBL career stats ==
Games:	263 (188 Bri, 75 GC)
Rebounds:	2.4 pg
Points:	5,037 (14.3 pg)
Free Throws:	366 / 440 (83.2%)
Field goals:	1,377 / 3,143 (43.8%)
3 Points:	639 / 1,468 (43.5%)
Steals:	478 (1.8 pg)
Assists:	1,045 (3.9 pg)
