= 1995 NBL season =

- League: National Basketball League
- Sport: Basketball
- Duration: 21 April – 16 September 1995; 20 September – 5 October 1995 (Finals); 7 – 15 October 1995 (Grand Finals)
- Teams: 14
- TV partner(s): Network Ten; Fox Sports

Regular season
- Season champions: Perth Wildcats
- Season MVP: Andrew Gaze (Melbourne)
- Top scorer: Andrew Gaze (Melbourne)

Finals
- Champions: Perth Wildcats (3rd title)
- Runners-up: North Melbourne Giants
- Finals MVP: Andrew Vlahov (Perth)

NBL seasons
- ← 1994 1996 →

The 1995 NBL season was the 17th season of competition since its establishment in 1979. A total of 14 teams contested the league.

== Clubs ==
Club	Location	Home Venue	Capacity	Founded	Head coach
Adelaide 36ers	Adelaide, South Australia	Clipsal Powerhouse	8,000	1982	(United States) Mike Dunlap
Brisbane Bullets	Brisbane, Queensland	Brisbane Entertainment Centre	13,500	1979	(United States) Bruce Palmer
Canberra Cannons	Canberra, Australian Capital Territory	AIS Arena	5,200	1979	(Australia) Brett Flannigan
Geelong Supercats	(Victoria (state)) Geelong, Victoria	Geelong Arena	2,000	1982	(United States) Jim Calvin
Gold Coast Rollers	Gold Coast, Queensland	Carrara Indoor Stadium	2,992	1990	(Australia) Dave Claxton
Hobart Tassie Devils	Hobart, Tasmania	Derwent Entertainment Centre	5,400	1983	(Australia) Bill Tomlinson
Illawarra Hawks	Wollongong, New South Wales	Illawarra Basketball Stadium	2,000	1979	(Australia) Alan Black
Melbourne Tigers	(Victoria (state)) Melbourne, Victoria	National Tennis Centre at Flinders Park	15,400	1931	(Australia) Lindsay Gaze
Newcastle Falcons	Newcastle, New South Wales	Newcastle Entertainment Centre	4,658	1979	(Australia) Tom Wiseman
North Melbourne Giants	(Victoria (state)) Melbourne, Victoria	The Glass House	7,200	1980	(United States) Brett Brown
Perth Wildcats	Perth, Western Australia	Perth Entertainment Centre	8,200	1982	(Australia) Adrian Hurley
South East Melbourne Magic	(Victoria (state)) Melbourne, Victoria	National Tennis Centre at Flinders Park	15,400	1992	(United States) Brian Goorjian
Sydney Kings	Sydney, New South Wales	Sydney Entertainment Centre	10,500	1988	(United States) Bob Turner
Townsville Suns	Townsville, Queensland	Townsville Entertainment Centre	5,257	1993	(Australia) Mark Bragg

== Regular season ==
The 1995 regular season took place over 21 rounds between 21 April 1995 and 16 September 1995.

=== Round 1 ===
Date	Home	Score	Away	Venue	Crowd	Boxscore
21/04/1995	Perth Wildcats	120–99	Newcastle Falcons	Perth Entertainment Centre	N/A	boxscore
21/04/1995	Melbourne Tigers	93–94	Illawarra Hawks	Melbourne Park	N/A	boxscore
21/04/1995	Townsville Suns	106–116	Brisbane Bullets	Townsville Entertainment Centre	N/A	boxscore
22/04/1995	North Melbourne Giants	118–97	Gold Coast Rollers	Melbourne Sports and Entertainment Centre	N/A	boxscore
22/04/1995	Adelaide 36ers	91–98	Newcastle Falcons	Adelaide Arena	N/A	boxscore
22/04/1995	Hobart Tassie Devils	86–84	Illawarra Hawks	Derwent Entertainment Centre	N/A	boxscore
22/04/1995	Geelong Supercats	102–112	Canberra Cannons	Geelong Arena	N/A	boxscore
22/04/1995	Sydney Kings	85–86	South East Melbourne Magic	Sydney Entertainment Centre	N/A	boxscore
25/04/1995	Gold Coast Rollers	129–139	Brisbane Bullets	Carrara Indoor Stadium	N/A	boxscore

=== Round 2 ===
Date	Home	Score	Away	Venue	Crowd	Boxscore
28/04/1995	Illawarra Hawks	115–114	Melbourne Tigers	Beaton Park Stadium	N/A	boxscore
28/04/1995	Hobart Tassie Devils	97–111	Perth Wildcats	Derwent Entertainment Centre	N/A	boxscore
28/04/1995	North Melbourne Giants	91–104	Sydney Kings	Melbourne Sports and Entertainment Centre	N/A	boxscore
29/04/1995	Newcastle Falcons	98–92	Melbourne Tigers	Newcastle Entertainment Centre	N/A	boxscore
29/04/1995	Canberra Cannons	103–96	Sydney Kings	AIS Arena	N/A	boxscore
29/04/1995	Geelong Supercats	117–93	Adelaide 36ers	Geelong Arena	N/A	boxscore
29/04/1995	South East Melbourne Magic	89–81	Townsville Suns	Melbourne Park	N/A	boxscore

=== Round 3 ===
Date	Home	Score	Away	Venue	Crowd	Boxscore
5/05/1995	Hobart Tassie Devils	89–129	North Melbourne Giants	Derwent Entertainment Centre	N/A	boxscore
5/05/1995	Melbourne Tigers	113–104	Adelaide 36ers	Melbourne Park	N/A	boxscore
5/05/1995	Townsville Suns	85–87	Geelong Supercats	Townsville Entertainment Centre	N/A	boxscore
5/05/1995	Canberra Cannons	117–102	Newcastle Falcons	AIS Arena	N/A	boxscore
6/05/1995	Newcastle Falcons	102–90	Illawarra Hawks	Newcastle Entertainment Centre	N/A	boxscore
6/05/1995	South East Melbourne Magic	94–96	North Melbourne Giants	Melbourne Park	N/A	boxscore
6/05/1995	Gold Coast Rollers	106–116	Geelong Supercats	Carrara Indoor Stadium	N/A	boxscore
6/05/1995	Sydney Kings	81–87	Adelaide 36ers	Sydney Entertainment Centre	N/A	boxscore
6/05/1995	Brisbane Bullets	119–113	Perth Wildcats	Brisbane Entertainment Centre	N/A	boxscore
9/05/1995	Perth Wildcats	100–114	Sydney Kings	Perth Entertainment Centre	N/A	boxscore

=== Round 4 ===
Date	Home	Score	Away	Venue	Crowd	Boxscore
11/05/1995	South East Melbourne Magic	106–87	Hobart Tassie Devils	Melbourne Park	N/A	boxscore
12/05/1995	Canberra Cannons	111–112	Melbourne Tigers	AIS Arena	N/A	boxscore
12/05/1995	Adelaide 36ers	91–81	Geelong Supercats	Adelaide Arena	N/A	boxscore
12/05/1995	North Melbourne Giants	104–109	Newcastle Falcons	Melbourne Sports and Entertainment Centre	N/A	boxscore
13/05/1995	Illawarra Hawks	111–95	Gold Coast Rollers	Beaton Park Stadium	N/A	boxscore
13/05/1995	Perth Wildcats	117–98	Geelong Supercats	Perth Entertainment Centre	N/A	boxscore
13/05/1995	Sydney Kings	114–107	Townsville Suns	Sydney Entertainment Centre	N/A	boxscore
13/05/1995	Brisbane Bullets	120–109	Melbourne Tigers	Brisbane Entertainment Centre	N/A	boxscore

=== Round 5 ===
Date	Home	Score	Away	Venue	Crowd	Boxscore
19/05/1995	Newcastle Falcons	107–112	Perth Wildcats	Newcastle Entertainment Centre	N/A	boxscore
19/05/1995	Melbourne Tigers	108–93	Hobart Tassie Devils	Melbourne Park	N/A	boxscore
19/05/1995	Gold Coast Rollers	115–119	South East Melbourne Magic	Carrara Indoor Stadium	N/A	boxscore
19/05/1995	Sydney Kings	97–100	Canberra Cannons	Sydney Entertainment Centre	N/A	boxscore
20/05/1995	Illawarra Hawks	96–103	Perth Wildcats	Beaton Park Stadium	N/A	boxscore
20/05/1995	Geelong Supercats	108–97	Hobart Tassie Devils	Geelong Arena	N/A	boxscore
20/05/1995	Townsville Suns	102–107	South East Melbourne Magic	Townsville Entertainment Centre	N/A	boxscore
20/05/1995	Brisbane Bullets	97–84	Canberra Cannons	Brisbane Entertainment Centre	N/A	boxscore
21/05/1995	Adelaide 36ers	85–112	North Melbourne Giants	Adelaide Arena	N/A	boxscore

=== Round 6 ===
Date	Home	Score	Away	Venue	Crowd	Boxscore
26/05/1995	Townsville Suns	105–104	Sydney Kings	Townsville Entertainment Centre	N/A	boxscore
26/05/1995	Illawarra Hawks	109–75	Hobart Tassie Devils	Beaton Park Stadium	N/A	boxscore
26/05/1995	North Melbourne Giants	96–110	South East Melbourne Magic	Melbourne Sports and Entertainment Centre	N/A	boxscore
26/05/1995	Adelaide 36ers	113–105	Melbourne Tigers	Adelaide Arena	N/A	boxscore
27/05/1995	Newcastle Falcons	90–83	Hobart Tassie Devils	Newcastle Entertainment Centre	N/A	boxscore
27/05/1995	Perth Wildcats	93–111	Melbourne Tigers	Perth Entertainment Centre	N/A	boxscore
27/05/1995	Gold Coast Rollers	121–85	Sydney Kings	Carrara Indoor Stadium	N/A	boxscore
27/05/1995	Geelong Supercats	112–106	Brisbane Bullets	Geelong Arena	N/A	boxscore

=== Round 7 ===
Date	Home	Score	Away	Venue	Crowd	Boxscore
2/06/1995	Newcastle Falcons	109–122	Gold Coast Rollers	Newcastle Entertainment Centre	N/A	boxscore
2/06/1995	Canberra Cannons	94–99	Illawarra Hawks	AIS Arena	N/A	boxscore
2/06/1995	South East Melbourne Magic	81–83	Perth Wildcats	Melbourne Park	N/A	boxscore
2/06/1995	Adelaide 36ers	105–96	Sydney Kings	Adelaide Arena	N/A	boxscore
3/06/1995	Melbourne Tigers	112–106	Geelong Supercats	Melbourne Park	N/A	boxscore
3/06/1995	Hobart Tassie Devils	116–100	Adelaide 36ers	Derwent Entertainment Centre	N/A	boxscore
3/06/1995	Sydney Kings	124–108	Gold Coast Rollers	Sydney Entertainment Centre	N/A	boxscore
3/06/1995	Brisbane Bullets	150–133	Townsville Suns	Brisbane Entertainment Centre	N/A	boxscore
3/06/1995	North Melbourne Giants	98–93	Illawarra Hawks	Melbourne Sports and Entertainment Centre	N/A	boxscore

=== Round 8 ===
Date	Home	Score	Away	Venue	Crowd	Boxscore
9/06/1995	Perth Wildcats	103–102	Adelaide 36ers	Perth Entertainment Centre	N/A	boxscore
9/06/1995	Gold Coast Rollers	116–113	North Melbourne Giants	Carrara Indoor Stadium	N/A	boxscore
10/06/1995	Canberra Cannons	101–103	South East Melbourne Magic	AIS Arena	N/A	boxscore
10/06/1995	Townsville Suns	115–119	North Melbourne Giants	Townsville Entertainment Centre	N/A	boxscore
10/06/1995	Sydney Kings	108–106	Geelong Supercats	Sydney Entertainment Centre	N/A	boxscore
10/06/1995	Brisbane Bullets	101–94	Hobart Tassie Devils	Brisbane Entertainment Centre	N/A	boxscore
10/06/1995	Illawarra Hawks	84–96	Newcastle Falcons	Beaton Park Stadium	N/A	boxscore
12/06/1995	Melbourne Tigers	117–135	South East Melbourne Magic	Melbourne Park	N/A	boxscore

=== Round 9 ===
Date	Home	Score	Away	Venue	Crowd	Boxscore
16/06/1995	Melbourne Tigers	128–104	Newcastle Falcons	Melbourne Park	N/A	boxscore
16/06/1995	Perth Wildcats	94–111	North Melbourne Giants	Perth Entertainment Centre	N/A	boxscore
16/06/1995	Townsville Suns	92–104	Illawarra Hawks	Townsville Entertainment Centre	N/A	boxscore
16/06/1995	Hobart Tassie Devils	81–95	South East Melbourne Magic	Derwent Entertainment Centre	N/A	boxscore
17/06/1995	Adelaide 36ers	129–120	Canberra Cannons	Adelaide Arena	N/A	boxscore
17/06/1995	Geelong Supercats	92–103	Newcastle Falcons	Geelong Arena	N/A	boxscore
17/06/1995	Gold Coast Rollers	106–102	Illawarra Hawks	Carrara Indoor Stadium	N/A	boxscore
17/06/1995	Sydney Kings	84–80	Hobart Tassie Devils	Sydney Entertainment Centre	N/A	boxscore
17/06/1995	South East Melbourne Magic	97–109	Brisbane Bullets	Melbourne Park	N/A	boxscore

=== Round 10 ===
Date	Home	Score	Away	Venue	Crowd	Boxscore
22/06/1995	South East Melbourne Magic	130–82	Gold Coast Rollers	Melbourne Park	N/A	boxscore
23/06/1995	Sydney Kings	92–79	Brisbane Bullets	Sydney Entertainment Centre	N/A	boxscore
23/06/1995	Illawarra Hawks	121–122	Canberra Cannons	Beaton Park Stadium	N/A	boxscore
23/06/1995	Perth Wildcats	74–70	Townsville Suns	Perth Entertainment Centre	N/A	boxscore
24/06/1995	Newcastle Falcons	111–106	Canberra Cannons	Newcastle Entertainment Centre	N/A	boxscore
24/06/1995	North Melbourne Giants	97–99	Brisbane Bullets	Melbourne Sports and Entertainment Centre	N/A	boxscore
24/06/1995	Hobart Tassie Devils	97–94	Gold Coast Rollers	Derwent Entertainment Centre	N/A	boxscore
24/06/1995	Geelong Supercats	116–100	Melbourne Tigers	Geelong Arena	N/A	boxscore
25/06/1995	Adelaide 36ers	106–90	Townsville Suns	Adelaide Arena	N/A	boxscore

=== Round 11 ===
Date	Home	Score	Away	Venue	Crowd	Boxscore
30/06/1995	Newcastle Falcons	81–66	Sydney Kings	Newcastle Entertainment Centre	N/A	boxscore
30/06/1995	Melbourne Tigers	111–97	Brisbane Bullets	Melbourne Park	N/A	boxscore
1/07/1995	Canberra Cannons	131–113	Perth Wildcats	AIS Arena	N/A	boxscore
1/07/1995	South East Melbourne Magic	113–97	Adelaide 36ers	Melbourne Park	N/A	boxscore
1/07/1995	Hobart Tassie Devils	105–107	Brisbane Bullets	Derwent Entertainment Centre	N/A	boxscore
1/07/1995	Townsville Suns	108–97	Gold Coast Rollers	Townsville Entertainment Centre	N/A	boxscore
1/07/1995	Geelong Supercats	118–125	Illawarra Hawks	Geelong Arena	N/A	boxscore
2/07/1995	North Melbourne Giants	109–100	Perth Wildcats	Melbourne Sports and Entertainment Centre	N/A	boxscore

=== Round 12 ===
Date	Home	Score	Away	Venue	Crowd	Boxscore
7/07/1995	Brisbane Bullets	104–87	Geelong Supercats	Brisbane Entertainment Centre	N/A	boxscore
7/07/1995	Adelaide 36ers	88–92	South East Melbourne Magic	Adelaide Arena	N/A	boxscore
7/07/1995	Townsville Suns	94–86	Newcastle Falcons	Townsville Entertainment Centre	N/A	boxscore
7/07/1995	North Melbourne Giants	102–86	Hobart Tassie Devils	Melbourne Sports and Entertainment Centre	N/A	boxscore
8/07/1995	Canberra Cannons	112–90	Hobart Tassie Devils	AIS Arena	N/A	boxscore
8/07/1995	Perth Wildcats	113–98	South East Melbourne Magic	Perth Entertainment Centre	N/A	boxscore
8/07/1995	Illawarra Hawks	122–102	Geelong Supercats	Beaton Park Stadium	N/A	boxscore
8/07/1995	Gold Coast Rollers	88–97	Newcastle Falcons	Carrara Indoor Stadium	N/A	boxscore
10/07/1995	Melbourne Tigers	109–89	Sydney Kings	Melbourne Park	N/A	boxscore

=== Round 13 ===
Date	Home	Score	Away	Venue	Crowd	Boxscore
21/07/1995	Canberra Cannons	113–111	Brisbane Bullets	AIS Arena	N/A	boxscore
21/07/1995	Newcastle Falcons	121–112	North Melbourne Giants	Newcastle Entertainment Centre	N/A	boxscore
21/07/1995	Perth Wildcats	127–94	Gold Coast Rollers	Perth Entertainment Centre	N/A	boxscore
21/07/1995	South East Melbourne Magic	116–96	Geelong Supercats	Melbourne Park	N/A	boxscore
22/07/1995	Illawarra Hawks	102–107	North Melbourne Giants	Beaton Park Stadium	N/A	boxscore
22/07/1995	Adelaide 36ers	107–95	Gold Coast Rollers	Adelaide Arena	N/A	boxscore
22/07/1995	Hobart Tassie Devils	74–99	Townsville Suns	Derwent Entertainment Centre	N/A	boxscore
22/07/1995	Melbourne Tigers	130–98	Canberra Cannons	Melbourne Park	N/A	boxscore
22/07/1995	Brisbane Bullets	115–118	Sydney Kings	Brisbane Entertainment Centre	N/A	boxscore

=== Round 14 ===
Date	Home	Score	Away	Venue	Crowd	Boxscore
28/07/1995	North Melbourne Giants	112–103	Townsville Suns	Melbourne Sports and Entertainment Centre	N/A	boxscore
28/07/1995	Perth Wildcats	95–93	Hobart Tassie Devils	Perth Entertainment Centre	N/A	boxscore
28/07/1995	Geelong Supercats	104–94	Gold Coast Rollers	Geelong Arena	N/A	boxscore
28/07/1995	South East Melbourne Magic	95–101	Illawarra Hawks	Melbourne Park	N/A	boxscore
29/07/1995	Canberra Cannons	90–93	Townsville Suns	AIS Arena	N/A	boxscore
29/07/1995	Adelaide 36ers	94–83	Hobart Tassie Devils	Adelaide Arena	N/A	boxscore
29/07/1995	Melbourne Tigers	108–98	Gold Coast Rollers	Melbourne Park	N/A	boxscore
29/07/1995	Brisbane Bullets	110–99	Newcastle Falcons	Brisbane Entertainment Centre	N/A	boxscore
29/07/1995	Illawarra Hawks	110–88	Sydney Kings	Beaton Park Stadium	N/A	boxscore

=== Round 15 ===
Date	Home	Score	Away	Venue	Crowd	Boxscore
3/08/1995	North Melbourne Giants	112–110	Melbourne Tigers	Melbourne Sports and Entertainment Centre	N/A	boxscore
4/08/1995	Illawarra Hawks	111–91	South East Melbourne Magic	Beaton Park Stadium	N/A	boxscore
4/08/1995	Gold Coast Rollers	107–97	Townsville Suns	Carrara Indoor Stadium	N/A	boxscore
4/08/1995	Hobart Tassie Devils	86–90	Geelong Supercats	Derwent Entertainment Centre	N/A	boxscore
5/08/1995	Newcastle Falcons	121–119	South East Melbourne Magic	Newcastle Entertainment Centre	N/A	boxscore
5/08/1995	Canberra Cannons	95–96	North Melbourne Giants	AIS Arena	N/A	boxscore
5/08/1995	Townsville Suns	116–115	Melbourne Tigers	Townsville Entertainment Centre	N/A	boxscore
5/08/1995	Sydney Kings	117–119	Perth Wildcats	Sydney Entertainment Centre	N/A	boxscore
5/08/1995	Brisbane Bullets	110–87	Adelaide 36ers	Brisbane Entertainment Centre	N/A	boxscore

=== Round 16 ===
Date	Home	Score	Away	Venue	Crowd	Boxscore
11/08/1995	Illawarra Hawks	103–99	Brisbane Bullets	Beaton Park Stadium	N/A	boxscore
11/08/1995	North Melbourne Giants	122–124	Adelaide 36ers	Melbourne Sports and Entertainment Centre	N/A	boxscore
11/08/1995	Hobart Tassie Devils	104–118	Melbourne Tigers	Derwent Entertainment Centre	N/A	boxscore
11/08/1995	Townsville Suns	100–109	Perth Wildcats	Townsville Entertainment Centre	N/A	boxscore
12/08/1995	Newcastle Falcons	93–113	Brisbane Bullets	Newcastle Entertainment Centre	N/A	boxscore
12/08/1995	Canberra Cannons	104–122	Adelaide 36ers	AIS Arena	N/A	boxscore
12/08/1995	South East Melbourne Magic	107–101	Melbourne Tigers	Melbourne Park	N/A	boxscore
12/08/1995	Geelong Supercats	105–107	Sydney Kings	Geelong Arena	N/A	boxscore
12/08/1995	Gold Coast Rollers	98–101	Perth Wildcats	Carrara Indoor Stadium	N/A	boxscore

=== Round 17 ===
Date	Home	Score	Away	Venue	Crowd	Boxscore
18/08/1995	Adelaide 36ers	102–91	Brisbane Bullets	Adelaide Arena	N/A	boxscore
18/08/1995	Hobart Tassie Devils	74–82	Newcastle Falcons	Derwent Entertainment Centre	N/A	boxscore
18/08/1995	Melbourne Tigers	123–108	North Melbourne Giants	Melbourne Park	N/A	boxscore
18/08/1995	Townsville Suns	124–115	Canberra Cannons	Townsville Entertainment Centre	N/A	boxscore
19/08/1995	Perth Wildcats	116–113	Brisbane Bullets	Perth Entertainment Centre	N/A	boxscore
19/08/1995	South East Melbourne Magic	104–106	Newcastle Falcons	Melbourne Park	N/A	boxscore
19/08/1995	Geelong Supercats	105–118	North Melbourne Giants	Geelong Arena	N/A	boxscore
19/08/1995	Gold Coast Rollers	116–120	Canberra Cannons	Carrara Indoor Stadium	N/A	boxscore
19/08/1995	Sydney Kings	93–105	Illawarra Hawks	Sydney Entertainment Centre	N/A	boxscore

=== Round 18 ===
Date	Home	Score	Away	Venue	Crowd	Boxscore
25/08/1995	Illawarra Hawks	106–103	Townsville Suns	Beaton Park Stadium	N/A	boxscore
25/08/1995	North Melbourne Giants	150–118	Geelong Supercats	Melbourne Sports and Entertainment Centre	N/A	boxscore
26/08/1995	Newcastle Falcons	93–92	Townsville Suns	Newcastle Entertainment Centre	N/A	boxscore
26/08/1995	Adelaide 36ers	91–81	Perth Wildcats	Adelaide Arena	N/A	boxscore
26/08/1995	Sydney Kings	106–129	Melbourne Tigers	Sydney Entertainment Centre	N/A	boxscore
26/08/1995	Brisbane Bullets	91–112	South East Melbourne Magic	Brisbane Entertainment Centre	N/A	boxscore
26/08/1995	Canberra Cannons	124–90	Geelong Supercats	AIS Arena	N/A	boxscore
26/08/1995	Gold Coast Rollers	106–112	Hobart Tassie Devils	Carrara Indoor Stadium	N/A	boxscore

=== Round 19 ===
Date	Home	Score	Away	Venue	Crowd	Boxscore
1/09/1995	Newcastle Falcons	91–100	Adelaide 36ers	Newcastle Entertainment Centre	N/A	boxscore
1/09/1995	South East Melbourne Magic	99–87	Sydney Kings	Melbourne Park	N/A	boxscore
1/09/1995	Geelong Supercats	127–113	Townsville Suns	Geelong Arena	N/A	boxscore
2/09/1995	Illawarra Hawks	89–110	Adelaide 36ers	Beaton Park Stadium	N/A	boxscore
2/09/1995	North Melbourne Giants	113–92	Canberra Cannons	Melbourne Sports and Entertainment Centre	N/A	boxscore
2/09/1995	Hobart Tassie Devils	109–111	Sydney Kings	Derwent Entertainment Centre	N/A	boxscore
2/09/1995	Brisbane Bullets	104–93	Gold Coast Rollers	Brisbane Entertainment Centre	N/A	boxscore
2/09/1995	Melbourne Tigers	104–117	Townsville Suns	Melbourne Park	N/A	boxscore
4/09/1995	Perth Wildcats	104–89	Canberra Cannons	Perth Entertainment Centre	N/A	boxscore

=== Round 20 ===
Date	Home	Score	Away	Venue	Crowd	Boxscore
8/09/1995	Hobart Tassie Devils	88–98	Canberra Cannons	Derwent Entertainment Centre	N/A	boxscore
8/09/1995	Geelong Supercats	99–114	Perth Wildcats	Geelong Arena	N/A	boxscore
8/09/1995	Gold Coast Rollers	108–121	Adelaide 36ers	Carrara Indoor Stadium	N/A	boxscore
9/09/1995	Melbourne Tigers	87–97	Perth Wildcats	Melbourne Park	N/A	boxscore
9/09/1995	Townsville Suns	105–118	Adelaide 36ers	Townsville Entertainment Centre	N/A	boxscore
9/09/1995	Sydney Kings	101–119	North Melbourne Giants	Sydney Entertainment Centre	N/A	boxscore
9/09/1995	Brisbane Bullets	109–92	Illawarra Hawks	Brisbane Entertainment Centre	N/A	boxscore
9/09/1995	Newcastle Falcons	104–87	Geelong Supercats	Newcastle Entertainment Centre	N/A	boxscore
10/09/1995	South East Melbourne Magic	115–97	Canberra Cannons	Melbourne Park	N/A	boxscore

=== Round 21 ===
Date	Home	Score	Away	Venue	Crowd	Boxscore
15/09/1995	Adelaide 36ers	84–74	Illawarra Hawks	Adelaide Arena	N/A	boxscore
15/09/1995	Gold Coast Rollers	111–132	Melbourne Tigers	Carrara Indoor Stadium	N/A	boxscore
16/09/1995	Perth Wildcats	109–93	Illawarra Hawks	Perth Entertainment Centre	N/A	boxscore
16/09/1995	Geelong Supercats	103–129	South East Melbourne Magic	Geelong Arena	N/A	boxscore
16/09/1995	Townsville Suns	127–107	Hobart Tassie Devils	Townsville Entertainment Centre	N/A	boxscore
16/09/1995	Sydney Kings	111–114	Newcastle Falcons	Sydney Entertainment Centre	N/A	boxscore
16/09/1995	Brisbane Bullets	109–122	North Melbourne Giants	Brisbane Entertainment Centre	N/A	boxscore
16/09/1995	Canberra Cannons	120–104	Gold Coast Rollers	AIS Arena	N/A	boxscore

== Ladder ==
Pos	1995 NBL season											
Pos	Team	Pld	W	L	PCT	Last 5	Streak	Home	Away	PF	PA	PP
1	Perth Wildcats	26	19	7	73.08%	4–1	W4	10–3	9–4	2721	2617	103.97%
2	S.E. Melbourne Magic^{1}	26	18	8	69.23%	4–1	W4	8–5	10–3	2742	2547	107.66%
3	North Melbourne Giants^{1}	26	18	8	69.23%	5–0	W5	8–5	10–3	2886	2694	107.13%
4	Adelaide 36ers^{2}	26	17	9	65.38%	5–0	W9	10–3	7–6	2651	2590	102.36%
5	Newcastle Falcons^{2}	26	17	9	65.38%	4–1	W2	9–4	8–5	2616	2611	100.19%
6	Brisbane Bullets	26	16	10	61.54%	2–3	L1	10–3	6–7	2818	2719	103.64%
7	Illawarra Hawks^{3}	26	14	12	53.85%	1–4	L4	8–5	6–7	2635	2584	101.97%
8	Melbourne Tigers^{3}	26	14	12	53.85%	3–2	W1	9–4	5–8	2891	2762	104.67%
9	Canberra Cannons	26	12	14	46.15%	2–3	W1	7–6	5–8	2768	2778	99.64%
10	Sydney Kings	26	10	16	38.46%	1–4	L2	5–8	5–8	2578	2692	95.77%
11	Geelong Supercats^{4}	26	9	17	34.62%	1–4	L3	6–7	3–10	2672	2836	94.22%
12	Townsville Suns^{4}	26	9	17	34.62%	2–3	W1	6–7	3–10	2677	2730	98.06%
13	Gold Coast Rollers	26	5	21	19.23%	0–5	L7	4–9	1–12	2700	2921	92.43%
14	Hobart Tassie Devils	26	4	22	15.38%	1–4	L3	3–10	1–12	2386	2660	89.70%

Updated to match(es) played on 16 September 1995. Source: NBL.com.au

The NBL tie-breaker system as outlined in the NBL Rules and Regulations states that in the case of an identical win–loss record, the results in games played between the teams will determine order of seeding.

^{1}Head-to-Head between South East Melbourne Magic and North Melbourne Giants (1-1). South East Melbourne Magic won For and Against (+12).

^{2}Head-to-Head between Adelaide 36ers and Newcastle Falcons (1-1). Adelaide 36ers won For and Against (+2).

^{3}Illawarra Hawks won Head-to-Head (2-0).

^{4}Geelong Supercats won Head-to-Head (2-0).

== Finals ==
=== Playoff bracket ===
Quarterfinals
1	Perth Wildcats	91	108	96
8	Melbourne Tigers	103	99	92
4	Adelaide 36ers	93	94	99
5	Newcastle Falcons	101	84	92
3	North Melbourne Giants	115	130	X
6	Brisbane Bullets	105	99	X
2	S.E. Melbourne Magic	108	92	93
7	Illawarra Hawks	113	89	75

Semifinals
1	Perth Wildcats	94	85	X
4	Adelaide 36ers	78	76	X
2	S.E. Melbourne Magic	77	98	92
3	North Melbourne Giants	98	79	107

Grand Final
1	Perth Wildcats	97	97	108
3	North Melbourne Giants	104	88	88

=== Quarter-finals ===
Date	Home	Score	Away	Venue	Crowd	Boxscore
20/09/1995	Brisbane Bullets	105–115	North Melbourne Giants	Brisbane Entertainment Centre	N/A	boxscore
20/09/1995	Newcastle Falcons	101–93	Adelaide 36ers	Newcastle Entertainment Centre	N/A	boxscore
22/09/1995	Perth Wildcats	91–103	Melbourne Tigers	Perth Entertainment Centre	N/A	boxscore
22/09/1995	Illawarra Hawks	113–108	South East Melbourne Magic	Beaton Park Stadium	N/A	boxscore
22/09/1995	Adelaide 36ers	94–84	Newcastle Falcons	Adelaide Arena	N/A	boxscore
24/09/1995	Adelaide 36ers	99–92	Newcastle Falcons	Adelaide Arena	N/A	boxscore
25/09/1995	Melbourne Tigers	99–108	Perth Wildcats	Melbourne Park	N/A	boxscore
26/09/1995	North Melbourne Giants	130–99	Brisbane Bullets	Melbourne Sports and Entertainment Centre	N/A	boxscore
27/09/1995	South East Melbourne Magic	92–89	Illawarra Hawks	Melbourne Park	N/A	boxscore
27/09/1995	Perth Wildcats	96–92	Melbourne Tigers	Perth Entertainment Centre	N/A	boxscore
29/09/1995	South East Melbourne Magic	93–75	Illawarra Hawks	Melbourne Park	N/A	boxscore

=== Semi-finals ===
Date	Home	Score	Away	Venue	Crowd	Boxscore
30/09/1995	Adelaide 36ers	78–94	Perth Wildcats	Adelaide Arena	N/A	boxscore
1/10/1995	North Melbourne Giants	98–77	South East Melbourne Magic	Melbourne Sports and Entertainment Centre	N/A	boxscore
3/10/1995	Perth Wildcats	85–76	Adelaide 36ers	Perth Entertainment Centre	N/A	boxscore
3/10/1995	South East Melbourne Magic	98–79	North Melbourne Giants	Melbourne Park	N/A	boxscore
5/10/1995	South East Melbourne Magic	92–107	North Melbourne Giants	Melbourne Park	N/A	boxscore

=== Grand Final ===
Date	Home	Score	Away	Venue	Crowd	Boxscore
7/10/1995	Perth Wildcats	97–104	North Melbourne Giants	Perth Entertainment Centre	N/A	boxscore
13/10/1995	North Melbourne Giants	88–97	Perth Wildcats	Melbourne Sports and Entertainment Centre	N/A	boxscore
15/10/1995	Perth Wildcats	108–88	North Melbourne Giants	Perth Entertainment Centre	N/A	boxscore

== 1995 NBL statistics leaders ==
Category	Player	Team	Stat
Points per game	Andrew Gaze	Melbourne Tigers	33.9
Rebounds per game	Reggie Smith	Newcastle Falcons	15.4
Assists per game	Darryl McDonald	North Melbourne Giants	10.4
Steals per game	Darryl McDonald	North Melbourne Giants	3.8
Blocks per game	John Dorge	South East Melbourne Magic	2.9
Free throw percentage	Andrew Gaze	Melbourne Tigers	89.8%

== NBL awards ==
- Most Valuable Player: Andrew Gaze, Melbourne Tigers
- Most Valuable Player Grand Final: Andrew Vlahov, Perth Wildcats
- Best Defensive Player: Darren Lucas, South East Melbourne Magic
- Most Improved Player: Tonny Jensen, Newcastle Falcons
- Rookie of the Year: John Rillie, Brisbane Bullets
- Coach of the Year: Alan Black, Illawarra Hawks & Tom Wiseman, Newcastle Falcons

== All NBL Team ==
#	Player	Team
1	Andrew Gaze	Melbourne Tigers
2	Darryl McDonald	North Melbourne Giants
3	Robert Rose	Adelaide 36ers
4	Andrew Vlahov	Perth Wildcats
5	Reggie Smith	Newcastle Falcons
6	John Dorge	South East Melbourne Magic

* Six players selected in 1995
