= Leroy Loggins =

American basketball player (born 1957)

Personal information
- Born: 20 December 1957 (age 68) New Brunswick, New Jersey, U.S.
- Listed height: 198 cm (6 ft 6 in)
- Listed weight: 80 kg (176 lb)

Career information
- High school: Forest Park (Baltimore, Maryland)
- College: Baltimore City CC (1976–1978); Fairmont State (1978–1980)
- NBA draft: 1980: 8th round, 161st overall pick
- Drafted by: Detroit Pistons
- Playing career: 1981–2001
- Position: Shooting guard / small forward

Career history
- 1981: Brisbane Bullets
- 1982–1983: West Adelaide Bearcats
- 1984–2001: Brisbane Bullets

Career highlights
- 3× NBL champion (1982, 1985, 1987); 2× NBL Grand Final MVP (1982, 1987); 3× NBL Most Valuable Player (1984, 1986, 1987); 9× All-NBL First Team (1982–1988, 1990, 1993, 1994); 9× NBL All-Star (1982, 1988-1995, 1997); 2× NBL All-Star MVP (1982, 1988); 2× NBL Defensive Player of the Year (1987, 1990); NBL's 20th Anniversary Team (1998); NBL's 25th Anniversary Team (2003); WVIAC Player of the Year (1980); 2× First-team All-WVIAC (1979, 1980)
- Stats at Basketball Reference

Leroy Jay Loggins (born 20 December 1957) is an Australian-American former professional basketball player who played in the National Basketball League (NBL) from 1981 until 2001.

== College career ==
Born in New Brunswick, New Jersey, Loggins attended Fairmont State University in Fairmont, West Virginia, and was drafted by the Detroit Pistons in the 8th round of the 1980 NBA draft.

== Professional career ==
In 1981 Leroy Loggins joined the Brisbane Bullets for his first NBL season helping the team to their second straight NBL Semi-final.

He signed to play for the West Adelaide Bearcats in the 1982 NBL season joining such players as captain-coach and the league's first ever Most Valuable Player Ken Richardson, Australian Boomers veterans Peter Ali and Ray Wood, and South Bronx-born guard and 1982 NBL MVP Al Green. The Bearcats won their only NBL Championship defeating the Geelong Supercats 80–74 in the Grand Final in Newcastle. Although there was no NBL Grand Final MVP named in 1982, Loggins was named player of the match being the game's top scorer with 32. He was also selected to his first All-NBL First team.

Following the 1983 season when West Adelaide lost the Grand Final to the Canberra Cannons, Loggins returned to the Brisbane Bullets where he would play for the remainder of his career. In 1984, Loggins continued great form saw him selected to the All NBL First team. He was also awarded the ultimate individual accolade when he was voted the NBL's Most Valuable Player for the 1984 NBL season averaging 29.3 points, 3.4 steals and 1.9 blocked shots per game.

1985 would see Loggins win his second and the Bullets win their first NBL championship when they defeated the Adelaide 36ers 121–95 in the Grand Final played on their home court at the Sleeman Sports Centre in Brisbane. Again there was no Grand Final MVP awarded that year, but Loggins was in top form again and was voted player of the game with a game high score of 41 points. Loggins form saw him selected to his fourth straight All NBL First team.

The Bullets moved from the 2,700-seat Chandler Arena into the larger, 13,500-capacity Brisbane Entertainment Centre in 1986 and Leroy Loggins won his second NBL MVP award that year, leading the Bullets to a second-place finish on the regular season ladder behind 36ers. They would again face Adelaide in the Grand Final with the NBL extending the final from a one-game playoff to a three-game series from 1986. Game 1 of the series was at the Entertainment Centre where a then Australian indoor attendance record crowd of over 11,000 was set, including celebrities such as international cricketers Greg Chappell and Ian Botham. After getting into foul trouble in the second period and having to sit most of it on the bench, Loggins helped fire a Bullets comeback in the 3rd period when he hit his (and Brisbane's) first 6 shots to help his team draw level at one point after being 14 down at halftime (during his half time talk to his team, Adelaide coach Ken Cole had predicted that Loggins would fire up in the 3rd period). The 36ers steadied though and helped by both Loggins (who scored 38 points) and Larry Sengstock fouling out in the 4th quarter, ran out winners in overtime. Game 2 was at the Apollo Stadium in Adelaide where the 36ers had gone 14–0 during the season. The Bullets shocked the home side with an easy 104–83 win to send the series to a 3rd and deciding game, also in Adelaide. Unfortunately for Loggins and the Bullets, the 36ers reversed the 1985 result winning in the final game 113–91. Ironically, Loggins fouled out of both games 1 and 3, including fouling out only midway through the 3rd period of game 3, and became increasingly frustrated at his lack of opportunities because of the close defence of former Bearcats teammate Peter Ali. Loggins MVP form saw him selected to his fifth straight All NBL First team in 1986.

In 1987, Loggins, the wirey 6-foot-5-inch (196 cm) swingman, became the first player to win back to back NBL Most Valuable Player awards, sharing the award with 1986 Grand Final MVP, Mark Davis of the Adelaide 36ers. Brisbane finished the regular season in second place behind Adelaide and made it to their fourth grand final in a row, this time playing the Perth Wildcats who had upset the defending champion 36ers in their three-game Semi-final series. Loggins MVP form continued in the grand final series as the Bullets swept the Wildcats 2–0, averaging 26.5 points over the two games. Loggins was named the Grand Final MVP and was also voted as the league's Best Defensive Player as well as being named to a record sixth straight All NBL First team.

Loggins was selected in 1988 to his seventh straight All NBL First team. Unfortunately, the Bullets would be beaten semi-finalists and in 1989 they dropped to 8th on in the standings and missed the playoffs for the first time since 1983. 1989 also saw Loggins' name missing from the All NBL First team for the first time since 1981.

1990 would see Loggins named as captain of the Bullets. It also saw him return to the All First team and he would also win his second Best Defensive Player award. Brisbane returned to form in 1990, fighting their way into the NBL Grand Final series against the Perth Wildcats, but couldn't overcome the talented Cats who included such players as James Crawford, Ricky Grace, Mike Ellis and former Harlem Globetrotter Kendal "Tiny" Pinder, as well as being coached by his former Bullets championship winning teammate Cal Bruton. Perth would gain a hard-fought 2–1 series victory for their first ever NBL championship. Game 2 of the series saw the highest ever NBL crowd in Brisbane when 13,221 fans flocked to the Brisbane Entertainment Centre to see the Bullets produce a 106–90 victory. Loggins averaged 16.3 points per game over the GF series.

Loggins would continue to captain the Bullets until his retirement following the 2000–01 NBL season. Between 1991 and his retirement, Loggins continued to be one of the best players in the NBL, leading the Bullets to the playoffs every season from 1992 to 1999. He would also be selected to the All NBL First team in 1993 and 1994.

During his career, Loggins was also selected to numerous NBL All-Star Games, winning the first two-game MVP awards in 1982 at the Apollo Stadium in Adelaide and again in 1988 at The Glass House in Melbourne. Although these games were 6 years apart, as there was no All-Star Game played from 1983 to 1987 this gave Loggins the distinction of being the only player to win consecutive NBL All-Star Game MVP awards. He is one of only three players (along with Andrew Gaze and Darryl McDonald) to win the award twice.

Loggins would eventually retire after 21 seasons in the NBL despite still being an integral part of the Bullets line-up at 43 years of age. The number 30 jersey worn by Loggins throughout his career was retired by the Bullets in his honour.

Loggins retired with a then record 567 NBL games, later surpassed by both Andrew Gaze and Tony Ronaldson. He also scored 13,106 points during his career, at 23.1 points per game, grabbed 3,897 rebounds at 6.8 per game, another Top 10 in the league achievement and is second in all time steals with 1,221 at 2.1 per game.

Leroy Loggins was inducted into the Australian Basketball Hall of Fame in 2006.

== International career ==
After becoming a naturalised Australian citizen, Loggins was selected to the Australian Boomers team for the 1992 Olympic Games in Barcelona where he joined others such as Luc Longley, Andrew Gaze, Phil Smyth, Larry Sengstock and Mark Bradtke in helping Australia to 6th-place finish with a 4–4 record. Loggins' best game for the Boomers in Barcelona came against Puerto Rico in Australia's final group game when he scored 19 points, had 7 rebounds and 4 steals. He averaged 12.2 points, 2.7 rebounds, 1.1 assists and 2.2 steals per game at the Olympics.

== Awards ==
- NBL Most Valuable Player – 3 (1984, 1986, 1987)
- All NBL First team – 10 (1982, 1983, 1984, 1985, 1986, 1987, 1988, 1990, 1993, 1994)
- NBL Grand Final MVP – 1 (1987)*
- NBL All-Star Game MVP – 2 (1982, 1988)
- NBL Best Defensive Player – 2 (1987, 1990)
- NBL's 20th Anniversary Team – (1998)
- NBL's 25th Anniversary Team – (2003)
- No official Grand Final MVP awarded in 1982 or 1985 but Loggins was named player of the match on both occasions

=== Brisbane Bullets records ===
- First in games played (539)
- First in points (11,777)
- First in assists (1,463)
- First in steals (1,194)
- First in blocked shots (463)
- First in offensive rebounds (1,147)
- First in defensive rebounds (2,286)
- First in total rebounds (3,433)
- First in turnovers (1,344)
- Fifth in free-throw percentage (1,769 from 2,114 for 83.2%)
- Tenth in three-point percentage (652 from 1,655 for 39.4%)

=== NBL records ===
- 23 40+ point games
