= Chandler Arena =

Indoor sports venue in Brisbane, Australia

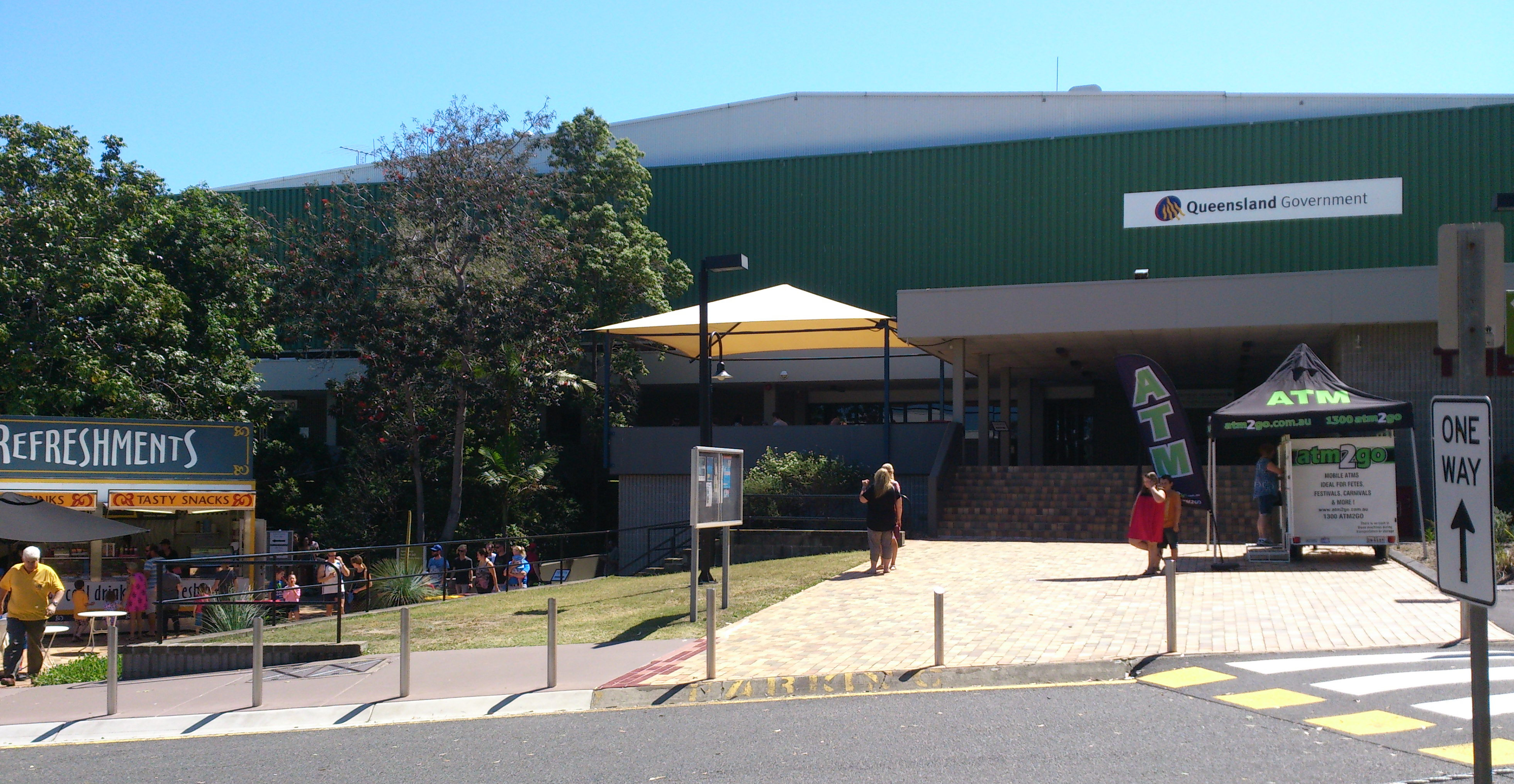
- Interactive map of Chandler Arena
- Former names: Sleeman Sports Centre
- Location: Chandler, Queensland
- Coordinates: 27°30′44″S 153°8′44″E
- Capacity: 2,700

Construction
- Opened: 1982

Tenants
- Queensland Firebirds (CBT) (1997-2008); Brisbane Bullets (NBL) (1984-1986)

The Chandler Arena (formerly the Sleeman Sports Centre) is an indoor sports venue, located in the suburb of Chandler in Brisbane, Queensland. It has a seating capacity of 2,700, and hosts netball, basketball, indoor soccer, badminton and volleyball.

The Sleeman Sports Complex, of which the Chandler Arena is a part, was purpose-built for the 1982 Commonwealth Games which were staged in Brisbane. Since then the centre has hosted a range of sporting events including the 1994 World Masters Games and the 2001 Goodwill Games swimming, diving and cycling events.

The Sleeman Complex, which includes the Chandler Arena, the Chandler Aquatic Centre, and the Chandler Velodrome, was named after the past Brisbane Lord Mayors, Sir John Beals Chandler and Frank Sleeman.

Chandler arena was also the one time home of the Brisbane Bullets of the National Basketball League between 1984 and 1986 before the team moved into the 13,500 capacity, state of the art Brisbane Entertainment Centre early in the 1986 NBL season. The Bullets won their first NBL Championship at Chandler Arena defeating the Adelaide 36ers 121–95 on 7 September 1985 in the last NBL Grand Final to be played as a single game. This turned out to be the only one of the Bullets three NBL championships that was won in Brisbane and the only one won at the Chandler Arena.

Chandler Arena was also the home of the Queensland Firebirds in the Commonwealth Bank Trophy netball series between 1997 and 2008 before the series became the ANZ Championship and the team moved to the larger Brisbane Convention & Exhibition Centre.
