= Peter Ali =

Australian basketball player

Personal information
- Born: 22 May 1956 Adelaide, Australia
- Listed height: 193 cm (6 ft 4 in)
- Listed weight: 95 kg (209 lb)

Career information
- Playing career: 1979–1992
- Position: Forward

Career history
- 1979–1984: West Adelaide Bearcats
- 1985–1990: Adelaide 36ers
- 1992: West Adelaide Bearcats

Career highlights
- 2× NBL champion (1982, 1986)

Peter Ali (born 22 May 1956) is an Australian basketball player who played for the Adelaide 36ers in the National Basketball League (NBL). He competed in the men's tournament at the 1980 Summer Olympics.

== Biography ==
Ali was born in Adelaide in 1956, playing his first game when he was six years old. He played his first match in the National Basketball League for the West Adelaide Bearcats in February 1979. In 1980, Ali was selected by the Australia men's national basketball team to take part in the men's basketball tournament at the 1980 Summer Olympics in Moscow.

Ali played for the Adelaide 36ers when they won the 1986 NBL season, when Adelaide put together the best season record in the history of the NBL. Ali's role for the team has been described as key to their title win. In the game that decided the season, Ali scored eleven points.

Ali played in a total of 259 NBL matches, across eleven seasons, for the West Adelaide Bearcats and the Adelaide 36ers. This included two NBL titles, in 1982 and 1986. He also played in more than 500 games at State League level.

Following his playing career, Ali coached the 36ers and the West Adelaide teams, and was inducted into the BSA Hall of Fame. He also became the chief executive of the McLaren Vale Grape Wine and Tourism Association. In 2001, Ali became the new Chief Executive of the National Basketball League. Prior to his appointment, Ali had been the General Manager of Netball South Australia for two years.

Since 2016, Ali was still living in Adelaide, and was working as the CEO of Legacy SA.
