= 1989 NBL Finals =

- League: National Basketball League
- Sport: Basketball
- Duration: 20 September - 20 October 1989
- Number of teams: 6
- TV partner: Seven Network

NBL Finals
- Champions: North Melbourne Giants
- Runners-up: Canberra Cannons
- Finals MVP: Scott Fisher

Seasons
- ← 1988 1990 →

The 1989 NBL Finals was the championship series of the 1989 season of Australia's National Basketball League (NBL) and the conclusion of the season's playoffs. The North Melbourne Giants defeated the Canberra Cannons in two games (2-0) for their first NBL championship.

== Format ==
The 1989 National Basketball League Finals started on 20 September and concluded on 20 October. The playoffs consisted of two best of three Elimination finals, two best of three Semi-finals and the best of three game Grand Final series. As the two top teams at the end of the regular season, the North Melbourne Giants and Canberra Cannons both qualified for home court advantage during the Semi-finals.

== Qualification ==
=== Qualified teams ===
Team	Finals appearance	Previous appearance	Previous best performance
North Melbourne Giants	2nd	1988	Runner up in 1988
Canberra Cannons	8th	1988	Champions (1983, 1984, 1988)
Perth Wildcats	2nd	1988	Runner up (1987)
Melbourne Tigers	1st	-	9th in 1984
Sydney Kings	1st	-	9th in 1988
Adelaide 36ers	6th	1988	Champions (1986)

=== Ladder ===
Pos	1989 NBL season											
Pos	Team	Pld	W	L	PCT	Last 5	Streak	Home	Away	PF	PA	PP
1	Canberra Cannons	24	18	6	75.00%	4–1	W4	10–2	8–4	2736	2580	106.05%
2	North Melbourne Giants	24	17	7	70.33%	5–0	W7	11–1	6–6	2993	2701	110.81%
3	Perth Wildcats^{1}	24	16	8	66.67%	3–2	W2	11–1	5–7	2681	2660	100.79%
4	Melbourne Tigers^{1}	24	16	8	66.67%	3–2	L2	8–4	8–4	2802	2660	105.34%
5	Sydney Kings^{2}	24	15	9	62.50%	2–3	L2	9–3	6–6	2471	2489	99.28%
6	Adelaide 36ers^{2}	24	15	9	62.50%	3–2	W2	10–2	5–7	2778	2668	104.12%
7	Eastside Spectres	24	14	10	53.85%	4–1	W4	9–3	5–7	2527	2454	102.97%
8	Brisbane Bullets	24	11	13	45.83%	1–4	W1	7–5	4–8	2563	2492	102.85%
9	Westside Saints^{3}	24	8	16	33.33%	3–2	W1	5–7	3–9	2522	2648	95.24%
10	Hobart Tassie Devils^{3}	24	8	16	33.33%	3–2	W1	6–6	2–10	2566	2757	93.07%
11	Illawarra Hawks	24	7	17	29.17%	0–5	L6	5–7	2–10	2826	2929	96.48%
12	Newcastle Falcons	24	6	18	25.00%	2–3	L2	5–7	1–11	2649	2799	94.64%
13	Geelong Supercats	24	5	19	20.83%	0–5	L6	3–9	2–10	2445	2722	89.82%

Updated to match(es) played on 16 September 1989. Source: NBL.com.au

== Playoff bracket ==
Elimination Finals
4	Melbourne Tigers	105	112	83
5	Sydney Kings	117	89	85
3	Perth Wildcats	122	114	112
6	Adelaide 36ers	124	94	108

Semifinals
1	Canberra Cannons	108	92	142
5	Sydney Kings	98	100	82
2	North Melbourne Giants	129	108	165
3	Perth Wildcats	108	111	110

Grand Final
1	Canberra Cannons	105	97	X
2	North Melbourne Giants	111	111	X

== Elimination Finals ==
=== (3) Perth Wildcats vs (6) Adelaide 36ers ===
==== Game 1 ====
Seven Network

20 September

boxscore

Adelaide 36ers 124, Perth Wildcats 122
Scoring by quarter: 33-31, 27-37, 33-35, 31-19
Pts: Pearce, Davis 25 each Rebs: Mark Davis 13; Asts: Mark Bradtke 5	Pts: Cal Bruton 35; Rebs: Crawford, Pinder 9 each Asts: Mike Ellis 11
Adelaide lead the series 1-0

Apollo Stadium, Adelaide
Attendance: 3,000
Referees: Eddie Crouch, Bill Mildenhall

==== Game 2 ====
Seven Network

22 September

boxscore

Perth Wildcats 114, Adelaide 36ers 94
Scoring by quarter: 27-31, 32-23, 28-18, 27-22
Pts: Kendal Pinder 25; Rebs: Kendal Pinder 14; Asts: Eric Watterson 7	Pts: Mark Davis 22; Rebs: Mark Davis 20; Asts: Green, Pearce 3 each
Series tied at 1-1

Perth Superdrome
Attendance: 4,500
Referees: Eddie Crouch, Ray Hunt

==== Game 3 ====
Seven Network

24 September

boxscore

Perth Wildcats 112, Adelaide 36ers 108
Scoring by quarter: 29-35, 34-26, 28-23, 21-24
Pts: Cal Bruton 29; Rebs: Kendal Pinder 14; Asts: Mike Ellis 8	Pts: Mark Davis 34; Rebs: Orlando Phillips 13; Asts: Darryl Pearce 5
Perth win the series 2-1

Perth Superdrome
Attendance: 4,500
Referees: Ray Hunt, Eddie Crouch

=== (4) Melbourne Tigers vs (5) Sydney Kings ===
==== Game 1 ====
Seven Network

20 September

boxscore

Sydney Kings 117, Melbourne Tigers 105
Scoring by quarter: 25-23, 30-29, 29-31, 33-22
Pts: Ian Davies 30; Rebs: Mark Ridlen 9 Asts: Steve Carfino 8	Pts: Andrew Gaze 38; Rebs: Gaze, Colbert 8 each Asts: Andrew Gaze
Sydney lead the series 1-0

State Sports Centre, Sydney
Attendance: 5,006
Referees: Ray Hunt, Roger Shiels

==== Game 2 ====
Seven Network

22 September

boxscore

Melbourne Tigers 112, Sydney Kings 89
Scoring by quarter: 32-26, 35-29, 24-19, 21-15
Pts: Dave Simmons 33; Rebs: Dave Simmons 15; Asts: Gaze, Giddey 5 each	Pts: Mark Ridlen 25; Rebs: Brad Dalton 12; Asts: Carfino, Keogh 4 each
Series tied at 1-1

The Glass House, Melbourne
Attendance: 7,200
Referees: Geoff Weeks, Bill Mildenhall

==== Game 3 ====
Seven Network

24 September

boxscore

Melbourne Tigers 83, Sydney Kings 85
Scoring by quarter: 20-30, 29-21, 16-19, 18-15
Pts: Andrew Gaze 30; Rebs: Warrick Giddey 15; Asts: Ray Gordon 4	Pts: Mark Ridlen 28; Rebs: Mark Ridlen 18; Asts: Mark Ridlen 4
Sydney wins the series 2-1

The Glass House, Melbourne
Attendance: 7,200
Referees: Geoff Weeks, Bill Mildenhall

== Semifinals ==
=== (1) Canberra Cannons vs (5) Sydney Kings ===
==== Game 1 ====
Seven Network

29 September

boxscore

Sydney Kings 98, Canberra Cannons 108
Scoring by quarter: 23-33, 30-30, 25-19, 20-26
Pts: Tim Morrissey 20; Rebs: Morrissey, Ridlen 14 each Asts: Ian Robilliard 6	Pts: Emery Atkinson 22; Rebs: Emery Atkinson 13; Asts: Emery Atkinson 7
Canberra lead the series 1-0

State Sports Centre, Sydney
Attendance: 5,006
Referees: Ray Hunt, Paul Beale

=== Game 2 ===
Seven Network

6 October

boxscore

Canberra Cannons 92, Sydney Kings 100
Scoring by quarter: 18-32, 23-17, 18-25, 33-26
Pts: Emery Atkinson 30; Rebs: Willie Simmons 12; Asts: Emery Atkinson 5	Pts: Mark Ridlen 29; Rebs: Mark Ridlen 19; Asts: Steve Carfino 5
Series tied at 1-1

AIS Arena, Canberra
Attendance: 5,200
Referees: Eddie Crouch, Bill Mildenhall

=== Game 3 ===
Seven Network

8 October

boxscore

Canberra Cannons 142, Sydney Kings 82
Scoring by quarter: 33-14, 45-20, 31-17, 33-31
Pts: Simon Cottrell 34; Rebs: Emery Atkinson 15; Asts: Phil Smyth 10	Pts: Tim Morrissey 26; Rebs: Brad Dalton 12; Asts: Keogh, Robilliard 4 each
Canberra wins the series 2-1

AIS Arena, Canberra
Attendance: 5,200
Referees: Eddie Crouch, Bill Mildenhall

=== Game 1 ===
Seven Network

30 September

boxscore

Perth Wildcats 108, North Melbourne Giants 129
Scoring by quarter: 26-35, 30-23, 18-37, 34-34
Pts: Cal Bruton 34; Rebs: Kendal Pinder 15; Asts: Eric Watterson 8	Pts: Scott Fisher 27; Rebs: Scott Fisher 13; Asts: Mark Leader 6
North Melbourne lead the series 1-0

Perth Superdrome
Attendance: 4,500
Referees: Eddie Crouch, Geoff Weeks

=== Game 2 ===
Seven Network

6 October

boxscore

North Melbourne Giants 108, Perth Wildcats 111
Scoring by quarter: 39-23, 22-29, 28-34, 19-25
Pts: Ray Borner 24; Rebs: Tim Dillon 14; Asts: Mark Leader 5	Pts: James Crawford 42; Rebs: Kendal Pinder 21; Asts: Cal Bruton 13
Series tied at 1-1

The Glass House, Melbourne
Attendance: 7,200
Referees: Ray Hunt, Geoff Weeks

=== Game 3 ===
Seven Network

8 October

boxscore

North Melbourne Giants 165, Perth Wildcats 110
Scoring by quarter: 37-29, 34-21, 47-24, 47-36
Pts: Scott Fisher 32; Rebs: Scott Fisher 14; Asts: Graham, Leader 5 each	Pts: Mike Ellis 18; Rebs: Steve Davis 11; Asts: Davis, Ellis, Bruton, Watterson 2 each
North Melbourne win the series 2-1

The Glass House, Melbourne
Attendance: 7,200
Referees: Ray Hunt, Geoff Weeks

North Melbourne's 55 point win over Perth in game 3 of their semi-final series would have been the record winning margin for an NBL Semi-final breaking the previous record of 48 held by Adelaide for their 151–103 win over Newcastle in 1985, except that on the same day Canberra beat Sydney by 60 points in the other semi final series. The Giants’ score of 165 also remains (as of the 2016 NBL Finals) the highest score in an NBL Finals game.

== Grand Final series ==
=== (1) Canberra Cannons vs (2) North Melbourne Giants ===
==== Game 1 ====
Seven Network

14 October

boxscore

Canberra Cannons 105, North Melbourne Giants 111
Scoring by quarter: 22-24, 33-24, 24-27, 26-36
Pts: Phil Smyth 23; Rebs: Emery Atkinson 11; Asts: Dufelmeier, Atkinson 5 each	Pts: Scott Fisher 37; Rebs: Tim Dillon 11; Asts: Carroll, Leader 4 each
North Melbourne leads series 1-0

AIS Arena, Canberra
Attendance: 5,200
Referees: Bill Mildenhall, Eddie Crouch

==== Game 2 ====
Seven Network

20 October

boxscore

North Melbourne Giants 111, Canberra Cannons 97
Scoring by quarter: 25-36, 31-20, 21-20, 34-21
Pts: Scott Fisher 33; Rebs: Tim Dillon 15; Asts: David Graham 5	Pts: Simmons, Mceachin 20 each Rebs: Willie Simmons 14; Asts: Emery Atkinson 3
North Melbourne wins series and NBL Championship, 2–0; Grand Final MVP: Scott Fisher (North Melbourne)

The Glass House, Melbourne
Attendance: 7,200
Referees: Eddie Crouch, Bill Mildenhall

== See also ==
- 1989 NBL season
