= List of Perth Wildcats coaches =

The Perth Wildcats are a basketball team from Perth, Western Australia. It was founded in 1982, and had its first season in the National Basketball League (NBL) that year. Since entering the NBL, the Perth Wildcats have had 15 senior coaches. As of the end of the 2024/25 season, John Rillie is the coach, making him the 15th coach in the club's history.

Trevor Gleeson is the most successful coach in Wildcats history, winning 5 championships as coach as well as 270 wins.

To qualify for this list, a coach must have coached the club in any regular season match or finals match. Pre-season matches, exhibition matches and other types of matches are not included.

== NBL Coaches ==
Note: statistics correct to the completion of the 2024/25 NBL season

#	Coach	Seasons	Total games				Finals games				Results		Achievements
#	Coach	Seasons	G	W	L	Win%	G	W	L	Win%	GF	CHP	Achievements
1	Henry Daigle	1982	26	10	16	38.5	—	—	—	—	—	—	
2	Gordan Ellis	1983	22	6	16	27.3	—	—	—	—	—	—	
3	Lynn Massey	1984	23	3	20	13.0	—	—	—	—	—	—	
4	Jay Brehmer	1985-1986	52	21	31	40.4	—	—	—	—	—	—	
5	Cal Bruton	1987-1988 1990	91	57	34	62.6	18	11	7	61.1	2	1	1987 runners up; 1990 champions
6	Alan Black	1989 1998-2002/03	214	128	86	59.8	31	16	15	51.6	2	1	1999/00 champions; 2002/03 runners up
7	Murray Arnold	1991-1992	58	39	19	67.2	8	5	3	62.5	1	1	1991 minor premiers; 1991 champions
8	Adrian Hurley	1993-1997	160	103	57	64.4	26	14	12	53.8	2	1	1993 minor premiers; 1993 runners up; 1995 minor premiers; 1995 champions
9	Mike Ellis	2003/04	34	15	19	44.1	1	0	1	0.0	0	0	
10	Scott Fisher	2004/05-2007/08	137	78	59	56.9	10	4	6	40.0	0	0	
11	Conner Henry	2008/09	31	17	14	54.8	1	0	1	0.0	0	0	
12	Rob Beveridge	2009/10-2012/13	130	84	46	64.6	18	10	8	55.6	3	1	2009/10 minor premiers; 2009/10 champions; 2011/12 runners up; 2012/13 runners up
13	Trevor Gleeson	2013/14-2020/21	270	172	98	63.7	38	24	14	63.2	6	5	2013/14 minor premiers; 2013/14 champions; 2015/16 champions; 2016/17 champions; 2018/19 minor premiers; 2018/19 champions; 2019/20 champions; 2020/21 runners up
14	Scott Morrison	2021/22	28	16	12	57.1	—	—	—	—	—	—	
15	John Rillie	2022/23-current	94	54	40	57.4	9	4	5	44.4	0	0	

=== Key ===
G	Games Coached
W	Won
L	Lost
Win%	Win Percentage
GF	Grand Finals
CHP	Championships

== See also ==
- Perth Wildcats
- National Basketball League
