= Mark Arena =

Australian businessman

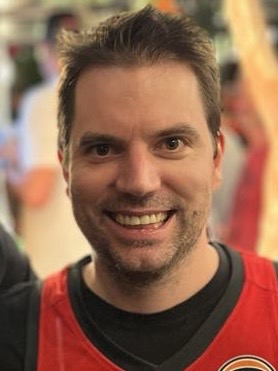
- Arena in February 2025
- Born: 28 September 1984 (age 41); Perth, Western Australia, Australia
- Education: Sacred Heart College, Edith Cowan University
- Occupations: Businessman; Cyber security entrepreneur
- Known for: Co-founder of Intel 471; Owner of the Perth Wildcats

Mark Arena (born 28 September 1984) is an Australian businessman and cyber security entrepreneur. He co-founded Intel 471 in 2014 and became majority owner of the Perth Wildcats basketball team in 2024.

== Early life ==
Arena was born in Perth, Western Australia. He grew up in Greenwood, went to school at Sacred Heart College and then studied software engineering at Edith Cowan University.

== Career ==
Arena started his career as a technical specialist for the Australian Federal Police in Canberra, where he tracked cyber criminals. He later moved to the Netherlands.

In 2014, Arena co-founded Intel 471, a company that tracked criminals and sold intelligence on cyber threats. He moved back to Perth after selling his company in 2023.

In May 2024, MT Arena Capital Investment Property Limited (MTACI) made a non-binding indicative offer for National Basketball League (NBL) club, the Perth Wildcats. In July 2024, Sports Entertainment Group agreed to sell 90% of their 95% shareholder ownership of the Wildcats to Arena at an estimated value of $40 million. On 14 August 2024, Arena officially became the majority owner of the Wildcats after purchasing 52.5 per cent of the club for $21 million. He was set at the time to provide another payment of $15 million in 2026 to receive an extra 37.5 per cent and then buy the entire club in 2028. In January 2026, Arena completed the remaining tranches of his ownership transaction, becoming full owner of the Wildcats. As of January 2026, he was the youngest owner in the league and also the only owner also filling the club's chief executive officer role.
