= Stephen Black =

Australian basketball player

Personal information
- Born: 5 April 1980 (age 46) Melbourne, Victoria, Australia
- Listed height: 186 cm (6 ft 1 in)
- Listed weight: 80 kg (176 lb)

Career information
- Playing career: 1998–2009
- Position: Guard

Career history

Playing
- 1998–2003: Perth Wildcats
- 2003–2007: Brisbane Bullets
- 2007–2009: Cairns Taipans

Coaching
- 2010: South West Metro Pirates
- 2016–2020: Willetton Tigers
- 2021–2025: Bendigo Braves

Career highlights
- 2× NBL champion (2000, 2007); All-NBL First Team (2004); All-NBL Third Team (2005); NBL Best Sixth Man (2003)

Stephen Black (born 5 April 1980) is an Australian former professional basketball player who played 11 seasons in the National Basketball League (NBL). He is the son of Alan Black.

Born in Melbourne, Victoria, Black attended the Australian Institute of Sport (AIS) in Canberra in 1998 and 1999. He made his debut in the NBL in October 1998, playing his first five seasons with the Perth Wildcats. He joined the Brisbane Bullets in 2003 and then the Cairns Taipans in 2007. He retired in 2009 having played 298 NBL games. His final season in the NBL was cut short by a back injury.

In 2010, Black coached the South West Metro Pirates in the Queensland Basketball League.

In April 2016, Black replaced his father as head coach of the Willetton Tigers in the State Basketball League. He parted ways with the Tigers in September 2020.

On 27 November 2021, Black was appointed head coach of the Men's NBL1 Bendigo Braves. He served in this position for four seasons until parting ways in 2025.
