= Jack Bendat =

Australian businessman (1925–2022)

Jack Bendat AM
- Born: 6 May 1925; United States
- Died: 17 February 2022 (aged 96)
- Occupations: Businessman; Property developer; Philanthropist
- Known for: Owner of the Perth Wildcats and Perth Lynx

Jack Bendat AM (6 May 1925 – 17 February 2022) was an American-born Australian businessman most known for his ownership of the Perth Wildcats basketball team between 2007 and 2021. Previously involved in construction and media businesses with longtime business partner Kerry Stokes, Bendat was involved in philanthropic and sporting interests.

== Early life ==
Bendat was born in the United States to a Polish-born father. He served as a private in the United States Army during World War II, including in Papua New Guinea. He migrated with his family from California to Perth, Western Australia, in 1966.

== Career ==
Bendat, along with business partners, Kerry Stokes and Kevin Merifield, were involved in the development of shopping centres in Perth and regional Western Australia. His business accomplishments include building Bunbury Plaza, one of the first country shopping centres in Western Australia, and went on to work on development of 11 shopping centres around the state. He also established country media service GWN. In December 1989, Bendat purchased radio station 6KY from Wesgo.

One of Bendat's major contributions has been the Bendat Family Comprehensive Cancer Centre at the St John of God Subiaco Hospital. Bendat's contribution to the community was recognised as WA Citizen of the Year in 2002. In 2006, he was awarded an honorary doctorate from the University of Western Australia, and in 2009 was appointed a Member of the Order of Australia.

Bendat bought the Perth Wildcats basketball club in 2007. In his time as owner, the club won six NBL championships: 2009–10, 2013–14, 2015–16, 2016–17, 2018–19 and 2019–20, and expanded significantly, drawing larger crowds to their new home court at Perth Arena. In April 2015, Bendat purchased the licence for the Perth WNBL team, the West Coast Waves and renamed them the Perth Lynx, and the following month, on his 90th Birthday, the WA Basketball Centre was renamed the Bendat Basketball Centre in his honour. He sold the Wildcats in July 2021.

== Personal life and death ==
Bendat's father died in 2005 at 101 years old.

Bendat was married to Eleanor until her death in 2018, at the age of 92. They had two children. Their son, Paul, died of cancer in 2017. Bendat died on 17 February 2022, at the age of 96.

== Net worth ==
Year	Financial Review Rich List		Forbes Australia's 50 Richest	
Year	Rank	Net worth (A$)	Rank	Net worth (US$)
2014	70			
2015				
2016				
2017				
2018	111 ▲	$704 million ▲		
2019	139 ▼	$679 million ▼		
2020	170 ▼	$634 million ▼		
2021	182 ▼	$639 million ▲		

Legend
Icon	Description
Steady	Has not changed from the previous year
▲	Has increased from the previous year
▼	Has decreased from the previous year
