= Eric Watterson =

Australian basketball player

Personal information
- Born: 30 June 1964 (age 62)
- Listed height: 185 cm (6 ft 1 in)
- Listed weight: 85 kg (187 lb)

Career information
- Playing career: 1984–1994
- Position: Guard

Career history
- 1984–1994: Perth Wildcats

Career highlights
- 2× NBL champion (1990, 1991)

Eric Watterson (born 30 June 1964) is an Australian former professional basketball player who played 11 seasons in the National Basketball League (NBL) for the Perth Wildcats.

== Career ==
In 1982 and 1983, Watterson attended the Australian Institute of Sport (AIS) in Canberra.

Watterson began his career with the Perth Wildcats in 1984 and was a member of their 1990 and 1991 championship winning teams.

He retired in 1994, having played 306 games for the Wildcats, the second Wildcats player after Mike Ellis to play 300 games for the club. The Eric Watterson Medal is awarded annually by the Wildcat players to the teammate who best embodies the team's values.
