= Lower Peach Tree, Alabama =

Unincorporated community in Alabama, United States

- Unincorporated community
- Location within the state of Alabama Lower Peach Tree, Alabama (the United States)
- Coordinates: 31°50′26.55″N 87°32′42.99″W
- Country: United States
- State: Alabama
- County: Wilcox
- Elevation: 190 ft (58 m)
- Time zone: UTC-6 (Central (CST))
  - Summer (DST): UTC-5 (CDT)
- ZIP code: 36751
- Area code: 334

Lower Peach Tree is an unincorporated community in Wilcox County, Alabama, United States.

The community was named for a peach tree which stood near the original town site (the town's name was prefixed with "Lower" to avoid repetition with another place called "Peach Tree" in the state). This town was devastated by an F4 Tornado on March 21, 1913, killing 27 people.

== Geography ==
Lower Peach Tree is located at 31.84070°N 87.54527°W and has an elevation of 190 feet (58 m).

== Notable people ==
- James Crawford, former professional basketball player who played in the Australian National Basketball League
- Brenda Lee Eager, soul singer and musical theatre performer. Grew up in Lower Peach Tree.

== In popular culture ==
Lower Peach Tree is featured as the setting of "Poachers", the titular story of Tom Franklin's short story collection.
