= Tim Dillon (basketball) =

American basketball player

Personal information
- Born: March 21, 1963 (age 63) Franklin Grove, Illinois, U.S.
- Listed height: 6 ft 9 in (2.06 m)
- Listed weight: 210 lb (95 kg)

Career information
- High school: Franklin Grove (Franklin Grove, Illinois)
- College: Northern Illinois (1980–1984)
- NBA draft: 1984: 3rd round, 49th overall pick
- Drafted by: Chicago Bulls
- Playing career: 1984–1992
- Position: Power forward

Career history
- 1984–1985: Pallacanestro Trieste
- 1985–1986: Círcol Catòlic
- 1987–1988: Athletes in Action
- 1988–1989: North Melbourne Giants
- 1989–1990, 1991–1992: Rockford Lightning

Career highlights
- NBL champion (1989); All-NBL First Team (1988); 2× First-team All-MAC (1983, 1984)
- Stats at Basketball Reference

Timothy Dillon (born March 21, 1963) is an American former professional basketball player. He played college basketball for the Northern Illinois Huskies. Dillon played professionally in the Continental Basketball Association (CBA), and overseas in Italy, Spain and Australia.

== Early life ==
Dillon is a native of Franklin Grove, Illinois. He attended Franklin Grove High School where his father, Ben, was the principal.

Dillon played college basketball for the Northern Illinois Huskies from 1980 to 1984. Dillon was selected to the All-Mid-American Conference (MAC) first-team in 1983 and 1984. He led the MAC in scoring during his senior season with 21.2 points per game. Dillon's 1,559 career points were the third-highest in Huskies program history.

Dillon was inducted into the NIU Athletics Hall of Fame in 1989.

== Professional career ==
Dillon was selected by the Chicago Bulls in the third round of the 1984 NBA draft. He declined to attend training camp with the Bulls because he thought that it was unlikely he would make the team. Dillon instead tried out for European scouts and signed with Pallacanestro Trieste in Italy. He averaged 19 points per game during the 1984–85 season.

Dillon attended preseason camp with the Bulls in 1985, but was released and became a free agent. He intended to return to Italy but his team picked another American player over him. Dillon instead signed with a team in Spain where he averaged almost 23 points per game.

In May 1986, Dillon injured his knee during a pick-up game. His knee had to be reconstructed and he was in rehabilitation for 14 months.

Dillon attended free agent camp with the Phoenix Suns in 1987. He played for Athletes in Action during the 1987–88 season and averaged 10.7 points per game.

In December 1987, Dillon was recruited by Bruce Palmer to play for the North Melbourne Giants of the Australian National Basketball League (NBL) for the 1988 season. He scored 995 points during the season which was an NBL record and he finished fifth in NBL Most Valuable Player Award voting. Dillon won an NBL championship with the Giants in 1989.

Dillon decided to return to the United States after the 1989 NBL season so he could live with his wife in a home they purchased in Dixon, Illinois. He joined the Rockford Lightning of the Continental Basketball Association (CBA) and averaged 12.5 points per game during the 1989–90 season.

Dillon played for Croatian team KK Slobodna Dalmacija at the 1991 McDonald's Open. He was asked to join the team permanently but declined because of the war happening in Croatia. Dillon returned to the Lightning where he averaged 10.9 points per game during the 1991–92 season. He left the Lightning in February 1992 so he could join a team in Spain. Dillon retired at the end of the season.

After his playing career, Dillon worked as a mortgage lender for Alpine Bank and lived in Cherry Valley, Illinois.
