= Scott Fenton =

Australian basketball player (1964-1989)

Personal information
- Born: 5 November 1964 Sydney, New South Wales
- Died: 21 August 1989 (aged 24) Perth, Western Australia
- Listed height: 193 cm (6 ft 4 in)
- Listed weight: 82 kg (181 lb)

Career information
- Playing career: 1982–1989
- Position: Shooting guard
- Number: 14

Career history
- 1982: Bankstown Bruins
- 1983: Australian Institute of Sport
- 1984: Bankstown Bruins
- 1985–1987: Sydney Supersonics
- 1988–1989: Perth Wildcats

Career highlights
- No. 14 retired by Perth Wildcats

Scott Fenton (5 November 1964 – 21 August 1989) was an Australian professional basketball player who played 140 games in the National Basketball League (NBL) from 1982 until his death in 1989.

Fenton was born in Sydney, New South Wales, and grew up in the suburb of Lugarno. He made his debut in the NBL in 1982 with the Bankstown Bruins. In 1983, he attended the Australian Institute of Sport (AIS) and played for the AIS men's team in the South East Australian Basketball League (SEABL). In 1984, he returned to the Bankstown Bruins. Between 1985 and 1987, he played for the Sydney Supersonics. In 1988, he moved to Western Australia to join the Perth Wildcats.

Midway through the 1989 NBL season, in the early hours of 21 August, Fenton and his fiancée Tina Christie (a fellow national basketball player in the WNBL with Perth's WAIS Breakers) were the innocent victims in a horrific car crash on Marmion Avenue in the Perth suburb of Hillarys. They were killed instantly when a V8 Holden Commodore, which police said had been travelling at up to 200 km/h while drag racing, ploughed into the driver's side of their Honda sedan near Flinders Avenue just after midnight. Fenton's father Keith – who was sitting in the back seat, survived life-threatening injuries.

In his honour, Fenton's #14 jersey became the first jersey to be retired by the Perth Wildcats. In honour of Christie, the WAIS Breakers (now Perth Lynx) retired her #4 jersey.

== See also ==
- List of basketball players who died during their careers
