= Alan Black (basketball) =

Australian basketball player and coach

Personal information
- Listed height: 188 cm (6 ft 2 in)
- Listed weight: 90 kg (198 lb)

Career information
- Playing career: 1979–1992
- Position: Guard
- Coaching career: 1989–2016

Career history

Playing
- 1979–1985: Nunawading Spectres
- 1986–1988: Perth Wildcats
- 1990: Willetton Tigers
- 1991–1992: Souwest Slammers

Coaching
- 1989–1990: Perth Wildcats
- 1991: Souwest Slammers
- 1993–1995: Illawarra Hawks
- 1996–1997: Sydney Kings
- 1998–2003: Perth Wildcats
- 2005–2008: Cairns Taipans
- 2015–2016: Willetton Tigers

Career highlights
- As coach: NBL champion (2000); 2× NBL Coach of the Year (1993, 1995); SBL Coach of the Year (1991)

Alan Black is an Australian former professional basketball player and coach in the National Basketball League (NBL). He played in the NBL between 1979 and 1988, before entering the coaching ranks in 1989. He led the Perth Wildcats to the 2000 NBL championship and earned NBL Coach of the Year honours in 1993 and 1995.

== Playing career ==
Black started his NBL playing career in the league's inaugural year, 1979, playing for the Nunawading Spectres. In 1981, he was a member of the Nunawading side that lost to Launceston Casino City in the Grand Final that season. After seven seasons with the Spectres, Black made the move west in 1986 to play for the Perth Wildcats. In 1987, Black was once again a member of a losing Grand Final side when the Wildcats were defeated by the Brisbane Bullets. His final playing season in the NBL came in 1988.

Black retired from the NBL with 243 career games.

== Coaching career ==
Black was named head coach of the Perth Wildcats for the 1989 NBL season, replacing Cal Bruton. He led the Wildcats to third on the NBL ladder (with 16 wins and 8 losses) and through to the semi-finals. He returned as Wildcats head coach for the 1990 season, but after only two games, he was controversially fired by the club in favour of Cal Bruton returning to the helm. That season saw the Wildcats win their very first championship.

In 1990, Black played 22 games for the Willetton Tigers in the State Basketball League (SBL). In 1991, he joined the Souwest Slammers, serving as player-coach. He played 31 games for the Slammers in 1991 and won the SBL Coach of the Year. In 1992, he played 28 games for the Slammers. The Slammers reached the SBL Grand Final in 1991 and 1992, where they finished runners-up both years.

In 1993, Black became the head coach for the Illawarra Hawks and led the club into the quarter finals each year until he left the club at the end of the 1995 season. During his time with the Hawks, Black was named the NBL Coach of the Year in both 1993 and 1995.

In 1996 and 1997, Black served as head coach of the Sydney Kings.

In 1998, Black returned to the Perth Wildcats as head coach, this time replacing Adrian Hurley. In the 1999–2000 season, Black led the Wildcats to the NBL championship. His son, Stephen, played a key role on the championship squad. Following a grand final series loss to the Sydney Kings in 2002–03, Black was not offered a head coach contract extension.

Black returned to the NBL as a head coach in 2005, this time for the Cairns Taipans. In his first season with the Taipans, he coached the team to their highest finish on the NBL ladder (5th) and to their first semi-final appearance. In December 2008, the Taipans were placed into voluntary administration. As a result, Black was sacked.

Black was appointed head coach of the Willetton Tigers for the 2015 State Basketball League season. Midway through the 2016 season, Black resigned from the role to take up a consulting position in Malaysia.

In March 2017, Black travelled with the Malaysia women's national basketball team to play in the SBL Blitz during the 2017 SBL pre-season. Later that year, he served as head coach of the Malaysian Institute of Sport, helping the women's team win the South East Asian games for only the second time in Malaysian history.

In July 2026, Black was inducted into the Basketball WA Hall of Fame.

== National team ==
Black played three games for the Australian Boomers in 1978.

Black served as an assistant coach for the Boomers between 1994 and 2000, including at the 1996 Atlanta Olympics, 1998 FIBA World Championship, and 2000 Sydney Olympics.
