= Perth Wildcats =

Basketball team based in Perth, Western Australia

- 2026–27 Perth Wildcats season
- League: NBL
- Founded: 1982; 44 years ago
- History: Westate Wildcats; 1982–1983; Perth Wildcats; 1984–present
- Arena: RAC Arena
- Location: Perth, Western Australia
- Team colours: Red, black
- CEO: Mark Arena
- General manager: Danny Mills
- Head coach: John Rillie
- Team captain: Jesse Wagstaff
- Ownership: Mark Arena
- Championships: 10 (1990, 1991, 1995, 2000, 2010, 2014, 2016, 2017, 2019, 2020)
- NBL Cup titles: 1 (2021)
- Retired numbers: 8 (6, 7, 14, 15, 21, 30, 42, 53)
- Website: Wildcats.com.au
Home	Away

The Perth Wildcats are an Australian professional basketball team based in Perth, Western Australia. The Wildcats compete in the National Basketball League (NBL) and play their home games at RAC Arena, known colloquially as "The Jungle".

After three years of strong lobbying to the NBL, the creation of a national basketball team in Perth finally occurred in 1982. The Westate Wildcats were established and played out of the 800-seat Perry Lakes Basketball Stadium. Interest in basketball steadily grew throughout the community and in 1984 the Westate Wildcats became the Perth Wildcats. The Wildcats have gone on to become the highest-drawing and most successful team in the league, having won NBL championships in 1990, 1991, 1995, 2000, 2010, 2014, 2016, 2017, 2019 and 2020, placing the team four ahead of Melbourne United and the Sydney Kings, who have six championships each. They are also the only team in NBL history to win championships in four different decades. Between 1987 and 2021, the Wildcats made the post-season 35 straight years, an accomplishment matched by no other professional sports team in Australia.

== The Wildcats in Perth ==
The Wildcats are the city's only major professional basketball team and are one of Western Australia's major summer sport teams, along with the Perth Scorchers (cricket, Big Bash League), Western Warriors (cricket, Sheffield Shield), and Perth Glory (soccer, A-League). The public support for the Wildcats has been deemed remarkable, particularly the way fans have bought into the brand to create the "Red Army". The Wildcats' sturdy culture has long been built on a history of winning. In 2009, after being on the brink of bankruptcy, owner Jack Bendat and managing director Nick Marvin transformed the franchise, focusing on being family-friendly and engaging with children in Western Australia. Instead of doing 20 school visits per year, the Wildcats started doing 100. This increased to 200 school visits in 2010, and the year after it rose again to 220. As of 2019, the players had a 350-hour community engagement obligation, 200 hours above what the collective bargaining agreement requires. The pair introduced a zero-tolerance swearing policy and instructed players to always make eye contact and acknowledge supporters, with the philosophy being: the more engaged the Wildcats were with the West Australian community, the more fans they accumulated. As a result, they are the most successful franchise in NBL history during the 2010s. Marvin departed the club in 2017 while Bendat sold the club in 2021.

Since moving to Perth Arena in 2012, the Wildcats have consistently drawn some of the NBL's largest home crowds. They surpassed 10,000 members for the first time in 2017, and have repeatedly hit or exceeded the arena's 13,000-plus capacity. Notable attendance milestones include:

- 13,559 fans vs Adelaide in January 2015
- 13,611 on multiple occasions in 2017 and 2018, including Game 3 of the 2017 Grand Final
- A league-record 183,689 total home attendance during the 2017–18 regular season
- New capacity records of 13,615 in December 2021 and 13,661 in December 2025

Between 2012 and 2019, the team was forced on extended road trips for much of December due to Perth's annual hosting of the Hopman Cup at Perth Arena in early January. This tradition continued with the United Cup's introduction in 2022. As of the 2025–26 season, the arena is unavailable for Wildcats games between the middle of December and the middle of January.

When the Wildcats have won the NBL title, the team's victory celebration and ceremony has been held in the City of Perth at Forrest Place.

== Franchise history ==
=== 1982–1986: Early struggles ===
Westate Wildcats logo (1982–1983)

In 1979, the National Basketball League (NBL) in Australia was formed. It took another three years of lobbying by the Perth basketball community before a team in Western Australia became a reality. Formed in 1982 as the Westate Wildcats, the Wildcats became the first, and so far only, Western Australian team to compete in the NBL. The team's inaugural coach was Henry Daigle and the majority of the inaugural squad was made up of players from the East Perth Eagles, Stirling Senators and Perth Redbacks, led by captain Mike Ellis. They played out of Perry Lakes Basketball Stadium and finished the 1982 season in tenth place with a 10–16 win–loss record. Gordon Ellis took over as coach in 1983, as the team finished 13th with a 6–16 record.

In 1984, the team was renamed the Perth Wildcats, but success did not ensue under coach Lynn Massey as the team finished at the bottom of the ladder (16th) with only three wins. A fourth coach Jay Brehmer joined the team for the 1985 season. Brehmer along with imports Dan Clausen and Roland Brooks aimed to lead the Wildcats to a finals berth for the first time. However, they narrowly missed out on the post-season with a 13–13 record and an eighth-place finish. The Wildcats suffered a major setback in 1986 with the loss of Brooks, after he suffered a season-ending injury just 10 games into the season. Without their star import, the Wildcats struggled to remain competitive as they finished the season in 12th place with an 8–18 record.

In 1986, Perth businessman Bob Williams bought the Wildcats and began to reshape the team's destiny.

=== 1987: First finals and grand final ===
Many changes occurred in 1987. Most significantly, the team moved from the small confines of Perry Lakes Stadium to the Superdrome. The Superdrome was capable of housing 5,000 people, compared to the 800-seat Perry Lakes Stadium. Also in 1987, still captained by Mike Ellis, the Perth Wildcats introduced players to the roster that would become household names such as Kendal Pinder, James Crawford, Cal Bruton (player/coach), Alan Black, Eric Watterson and Trevor Torrance.

The new talent paid off immediately for the Wildcats as the team made the finals for the first time. In the first two stages of the finals, the Wildcats defeated the Canberra Cannons and minor premier Adelaide 36ers to suddenly find themselves in the Grand Final series against the Brisbane Bullets. The Wildcats were repeatedly referred to as the 'Cinderella' story as they entered the season having finished in third-last position in 1986, only to go on to make the Grand Final after finishing the 1987 regular season in fourth position with a 19–7 record. The 'run, stun and have some fun' style of play that had been implemented that season had worked wonders until the Grand Final series. The series was a promoter's dream: East Coast versus West; solid fundamentals versus "run and gun"; future Hall of Fame members on both sides on the floor; and two coaches who couldn't stand each other (Brian Kerle versus Cal Bruton). The Bullets defeated the Wildcats by just one point in front of a sell-out Perth crowd in Game 1 of the three-match series, before claiming the Championship in Brisbane in Game 2 a few days later.

=== 1990–2000: First Championship era ===
==== 1990: First Championship ====
1988 and 1989 both resulted in losses to the North Melbourne Giants in the Semi-finals. In 1990 West Australian businessman Kerry Stokes became co-owner of the franchise and decided to move the home court to the 8,000-seat Perth Entertainment Centre.

After retiring as a player following the 1989 season, Cal Bruton became the Wildcats' general manager in 1990. Eager for the team to win its first NBL Championship, Bruton embarked on an active recruiting campaign during the off-season; a recruiting campaign that saw the introduction of a player that is regularly referred to as the Wildcats' greatest: Ricky 'Amazing' Grace. Grace teamed-up with Mike Ellis to create a dominating backcourt. The 1990 season began with turmoil as coach Alan Black was controversially fired after only two games, and was replaced by Cal Bruton. Despite the shaky start to the season, the Wildcats recovered to finish in fifth place with a 17–9 record. Entering the finals as underdogs, the Wildcats swept the Melbourne Tigers in the Elimination Finals and got their revenge over the North Melbourne Giants with a 2–1 victory in the Semi-finals to again face the Brisbane Bullets in their second Grand Final appearance.

Tens of thousands of people across Western Australia tuned into the live coverage to watch the Wildcats triumph 112–106 in Game 1 of the Grand Final series in front of a sold-out Perth Entertainment Centre. Brisbane tied the series at 1–1 after winning Game 2 in convincing fashion at home, 106–90. In the deciding game also in Brisbane a few days later, the Wildcats blew the game wide open in the third quarter and were up by 20 points before the final term. They cruised to a 109–86 victory to claim their first NBL Championship. For his superb series, Grace was recognised as grand final MVP. Over the three games, Grace averaged 24.7 points per game.

==== 1991: Back-to-back championships ====
In controversial circumstances, Cal Bruton was not retained as coach despite leading the Wildcats to a championship in 1990. He was replaced by Murray Arnold, a former assistant coach with the Chicago Bulls. Arnold's style of game was focused on defence which was a significant change from the high scoring and entertaining style previously implemented under Bruton. In pursuit of back-to-back championships, the Wildcats strengthened their roster considerably in the off-season with the addition of future WA basketball legend Andrew Vlahov and Peter Hansen, an American who arrived via Venezuela, Spain and the Perry Lakes Hawks.

Arnold's Wildcats were a highly successful team, as they finished the regular season as minor premiers with a 22–4 record. After another successful regular season, the Wildcats entered the finals brimming with confidence. The Wildcats easily accounted for long-term rivals the Adelaide 36ers in the Semi-finals to then find themselves against the highly rated Eastside Spectres in the Grand Final. The Wildcats had a unique opportunity to win back-to-back titles, a feat only achieved by two other teams to that point in the history of the NBL. Everything looked on track when the Wildcats were able to defeat the Spectres in Game 1 in Melbourne by 26 points (109–83). Perth had hit fever pitch and another sold-out crowd awaited the Wildcats for Game 2 back at home. However, with their backs against the wall, the Spectres performed with a never-say-die attitude and upset the favourites at home by five points (86–81). Game 2 was played on a Friday night and Game 3 was scheduled for Sunday, leaving the Wildcats little time to formulate a new strategy. However, in front of an electric Perth crowd, the Wildcats were victorious in the deciding third game by 10 points (90–80) and became the third team in history to win back-to-back NBL Championships. Hansen was named MVP of the Grand Final series after averaging 17.3 points per game over the three games.

Just as Mike Ellis had hoped, he and the likes of Pinder, Crawford, Grace and Vlahov found themselves in the midst of a Perth Wildcats dynasty.

==== 1993: Fourth Grand Final in seven years ====
After a down year in 1992 produced a quarter-final loss, three major personnel changes occurred heading into the 1993 season. Club legend and captain Mike Ellis retired after 12 seasons, Dr Adrian Hurley was appointed as the new head coach replacing Murray Arnold, and finally the Wildcats enticed two-time league MVP Scott Fisher to the team.

With new captain Andrew Vlahov at the helm, the Wildcats continued their on-court success to finish as minor premiers and make it through to another Grand Final series, this time against a Melbourne Tigers team led by Andrew Gaze, Lanard Copeland and Mark Bradtke. The impending series is often described as the best Grand Final series in the history of the NBL. After splitting the first two games of the series, the championship came down to the final few seconds of Game 3 when Vlahov missed a three-point shot to tie the game with only seconds remaining. Despite being on the losing team, Ricky Grace was named the MVP of the series after averaging 22.3 points per game over the three games.

==== 1995: Third Championship ====
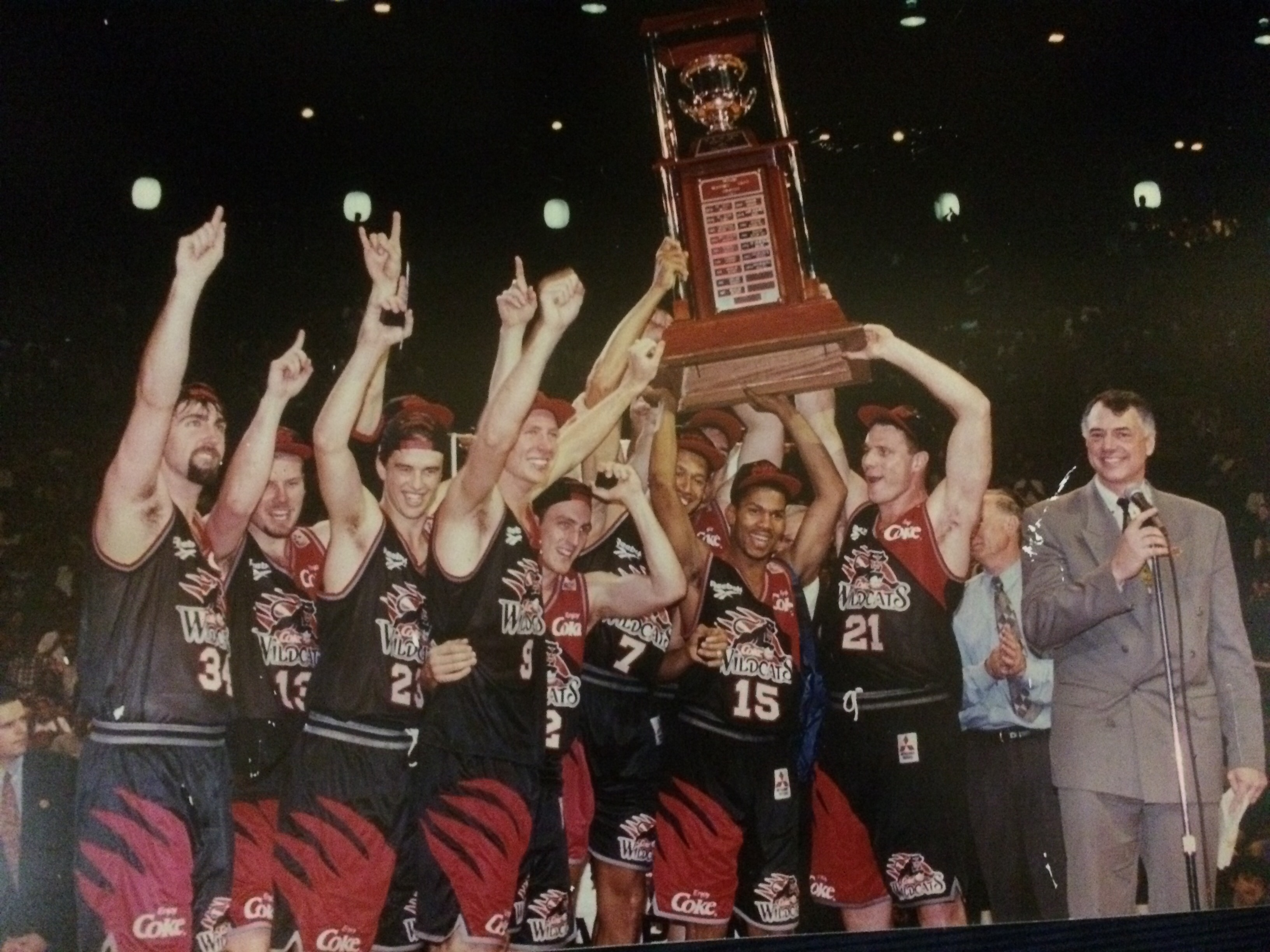
The 1995 Championship-winning Wildcats

Following a disappointing 1994 season, the Wildcats looked to recruit a pure sharp shooter to stretch opposing defenses and free up more room in the low post for the likes of Scott Fisher, James Crawford and Andrew Vlahov to operate in. Anthony Stewart was signed from the Hobart Tassie Devils to fill this role. Joining Stewart in the backcourt was Ricky Grace and Aaron Trahair, while Martin Cattalini rounded out the eight-man rotation used by coach Adrian Hurley.

The Wildcats were highly successful in 1995, as coach Hurley guided the team to what was referred to as the 'Triple Crown'—winning the pre-season competition, finishing minor premiers and then winning the NBL Championship. After defeating the Melbourne Tigers in the quarter-finals and the Adelaide 36ers in the Semi-finals, the Wildcats won through to their fifth Grand Final in nine years. In a rollercoaster Grand Final series against the North Melbourne Giants, both teams won away contests to be level coming into the deciding Game 3. The Wildcats went on to overpower the Giants in Game 3 and recorded a comfortable 108–88 victory in claiming their third NBL title. Captain Andrew Vlahov was named MVP of the Grand Final series after averaging 24 points per game over the three games.

The Wildcats' championship win booked themselves a trip to London to play in the McDonald's Championship, an international tournament featuring the best clubs in the world. The Wildcats lost to the Houston Rockets 116–72 in their first game of the tournament, but managed to defeat Real Madrid 93–86 in their second game.

==== 1999–2000: Fourth Championship ====
Following four straight injury-plagued seasons that all resulted in early finals exists, the Wildcats geared up for a big season in 1999–2000 behind coach Alan Black and stalwarts Andrew Vlahov, Ricky Grace, Scott Fisher and Anthony Stewart, as well as the up-and-coming James Harvey and two-year centre Paul Rogers. In a boost for the Wildcats mid-season, the team signed import Marcus Timmons for their run to the finals.

Prior to the season, Perth Wildcats owner Kerry Stokes decided to pass on the reins of the franchise to basketball great Luc Longley, fresh off being a three-time NBA championship winner with the Chicago Bulls, and Andrew Vlahov. The new ownership duo proved to be an instant success with the Wildcats securing an unprecedented fourth championship, defeating the Victoria Titans in front of a capacity crowd of 8,000 at the Perth Entertainment Centre. The Wildcats swept the Grand Final series 2–0, winning Game 1 in Melbourne 84–78 before returning home to clinch the series with an 83–76 Game 2 win. After scoring a game-high 27 points in Game 2, Marcus Timmons was named MVP of the series. To top off the season, Paul Rogers became the first Wildcat to be honoured as the regular-season MVP.

=== 2000–2009: Championship drought ===
Perth Wildcats logo (2002–2025)

The 2000s saw the Wildcats go on a championship drought. Following the closure of the Perth Entertainment Centre, the Wildcats moved back to the Superdrome, now known as Challenge Stadium, for the 2002–03 season. The 2002–03 season saw the Wildcats play in their seventh Grand Final series behind Ricky Grace and coach Alan Black. In the championship series, the Wildcats were outclassed by the Sydney Kings, as they lost Game 1 in Sydney 98–94 before returning home and losing 117–101 in Game 2. In addition to Grace, Alan Black's son, Stephen Black, was also an important member of the Wildcats' 2003 grand final team, as was Tony Ronaldson, Rob Feaster, Matthew Burston, Brett Wheeler and James Harvey.

In the days following their grand final loss to the Kings, the Wildcats decided not to renew Black's contract and parted ways with him for a second time. Club legend Mike Ellis was appointed head coach for the 2003–04 season, but in his lone season as coach of the Wildcats, Ellis guided the team to their first losing season since 1986, as they finished in seventh spot with a 15–18 record and earned a quarter-final defeat. Ellis was replaced for the 2004–05 season by another former player, Scott Fisher. In addition, co-owner Luc Longley relinquished his majority share of the Wildcats in April 2004, leaving Andrew Vlahov as the sole owner of the franchise. The 2004–05 season saw the end of an era as captain Ricky Grace retired as a four-time NBL champion and a 15-year member of the Wildcats.

With Grace retired, the 2005–06 season saw the introduction of future club legend Shawn Redhage while West Australian businessman Jack Bendat became the chairman and majority shareholder of the franchise. Although no longer the majority shareholder, Andrew Vlahov remained in control of the team as managing director. Bendat assumed full control in 2007.

The Wildcats celebrated their 25th anniversary in 2006–07 and recorded 23 wins. The Wildcats fell short in the finals in both 2007 and 2008, with Connor Henry replacing Scott Fisher for the 2008–09 season. Another early finals exist led to Henry's tenure lasting only one season.

=== 2009–2021: Second Championship era ===
==== 2009–10: Fifth Championship ====
Following the 2008–09 season, the Wildcats came within weeks of folding unless they raised a million dollars in sponsorship. The NBL itself was also in strife; with the competition falling on tough times, there was a real possibility at the time that there would be no league in 2009–10. Collaborating with other clubs, the Wildcats helped reform the league. Of all the teams in the NBL, the Wildcats underwent the greatest transformation. Under the guidance of managing director Nick Marvin, the club slashed $1.5 million worth of staff and hired a new coach, Rob Beveridge. The Wildcats also partnered with the WA Government to promote its 'Alcohol: Think again' initiative. Meanwhile, the NBL made significant changes to the competition. One of Basketball Australia's moves for the 2009–10 season was to return the NBL game to a 40-minute format from the 48-minutes it adopted in 1984, ostensibly to accommodate the international game. This was done to bring Australia back in step with the rest of the world (outside the NBA) and to be more attractive to television as a package because a 40-minute game slots well into a two-hour timeslot.

Beveridge was instrumental in compiling a new-look team where Shawn Redhage, Stephen Weigh and Brad Robbins were surrounded by proven NBL players Damian Martin, Drew Williamson, Luke Schenscher and Martin Cattalini, and rising stars Kevin Lisch and Jesse Wagstaff. Paul Rogers relinquished the captaincy heading into the 2009–10 season, handing over the reins to Redhage. Import Galen Young was acquired mid season to replace Rogers, who succumbed to a career-ending injury. After claiming the minor premiership and beating the Gold Coast Blaze in the Semi-finals, the Wildcats came up against the Wollongong Hawks in their first Grand Final series since 2003. After Games 1 and 2 proved to be comfortable victories for each home team, the Wildcats found themselves down by as many as 11 points in the second quarter of Game 3, before Lisch exploded offensively to finish with 29 points in lifting the team to a record fifth NBL Championship with a 96–72 win. Lisch was subsequently named MVP of the series.

==== 2011–2013: Back-to-back Grand Final defeats ====
Following what was a season crippled by serious injuries to Jesse Wagstaff, Matthew Knight and Shawn Redhage in 2010–11, the Wildcats looked to get back on top in 2011–12 with the addition of 7'2" centre Luke Nevill. In a pleasing move, Redhage returned to action in 2011–12 after it was initially feared he'd possibly never play again following his injury in 2010–11. Perth had its heart and soul torn out in January 2011 when, for the first time in his career, co-captain Shawn Redhage was injured. The six-time club MVP lunged for a contested ball in a way that punched the head of his femur through his pelvis, breaking the bone and dislocating the joint.

The 2011–12 season saw the Wildcats jostle over top spot for the majority of the season with the New Zealand Breakers. The two teams went on to meet in the Grand Final, where the Breakers defeated the Wildcats in three games. Game 2 of the series saw Redhage force a third and deciding game with a final-second block on Breakers guard C. J. Bruton. Lisch was named league MVP for the 2011–12 season, making him just the second Wildcat to achieve the honour.

The Wildcats had a new home venue for the 2012–13 season, moving into the 13,000-seat Perth Arena. With an injury to Matthew Knight early in the season, Michael Dunigan was brought in as a short-term replacement. Co-captain Brad Robbins abruptly retired just eight games into the season, sighting he had lost motivation and passion for the game, while Cameron Tovey announced in March that the 2012–13 season would be his last in the NBL. The Wildcats finished second in 2012–13 and made their way through to yet another Grand Final series, where they had a re-match against the New Zealand Breakers. However, the Wildcats were dealt a major blow when Damian Martin was ruled out of the grand final series with an Achilles injury. Brad Robbins was subsequently rushed back into the team to take Martin's place. The Wildcats lost 2–0 to a Breakers side that won their third consecutive championship in 2013.

==== 2013–14: Sixth Championship ====
The 2013 off-season saw the departure of Rob Beveridge, Kevin Lisch and Cameron Tovey, with Trevor Gleeson, James Ennis, and Jermaine Beal replacing them. With Damian Martin, Shawn Redhage, Jesse Wagstaff, Matthew Knight and Greg Hire all returning, they were joined alongside Tom Jervis, Drake U'u and Erik Burdon. Knight missed much of the regular season through injury, leading to the Wildcats signing Jarrad Prue and Jeremiah Trueman as short-term replacement players.

In the season opener against the Adelaide 36ers, Ennis scored 25 points to set the most points scored by a Wildcat making their NBL debut. The Wildcats started the season with eight straight wins before finishing with a league-best 21–7 record.

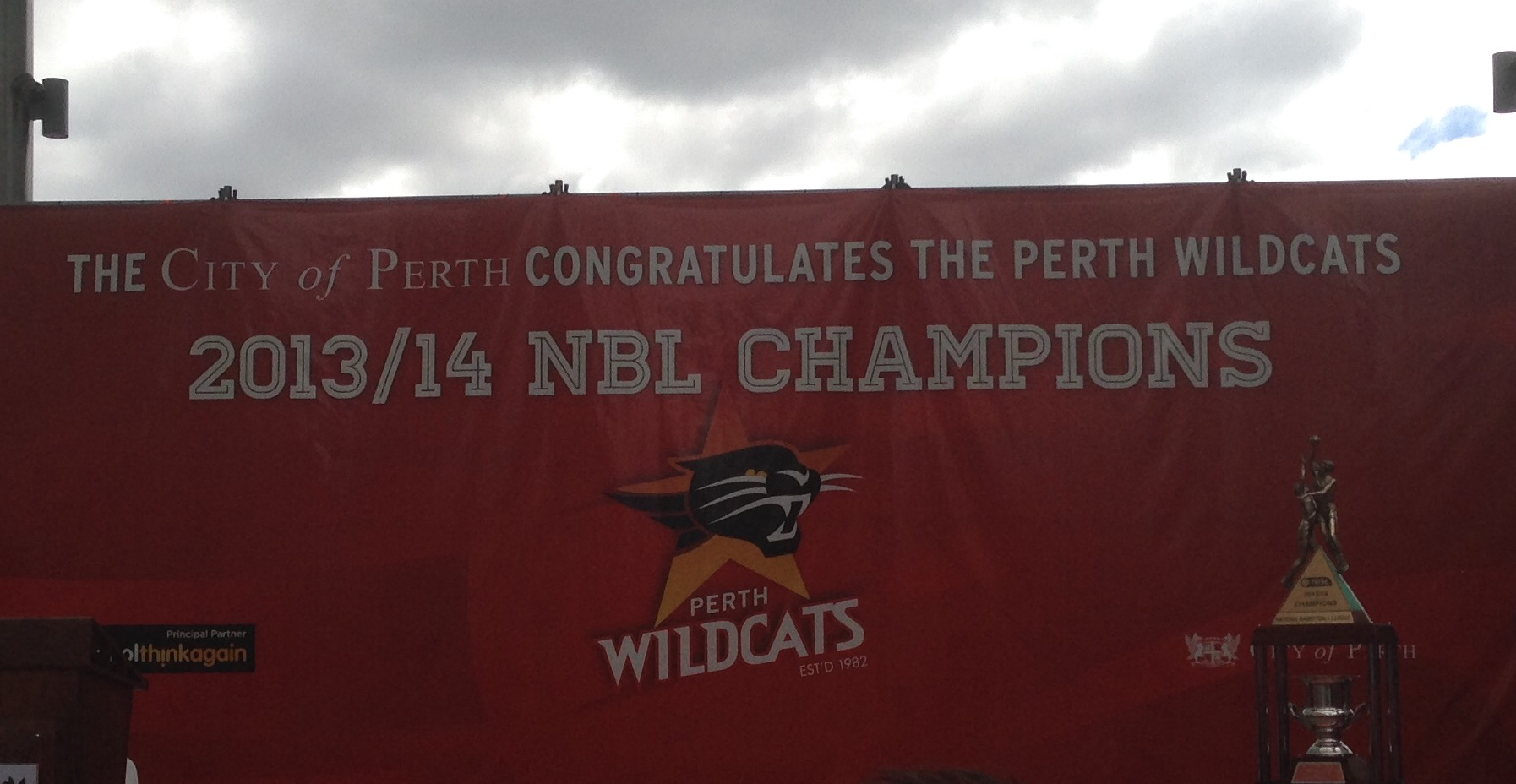
The Wildcats' 2014 championship celebration

The Wildcats reached their 11th Grand Final appearance with a 2–0 semi-final series win over the Wollongong Hawks. In the grand final, they faced the 36ers. After winning Game 1 in Perth on the back of a 30-point effort from Ennis, the 36ers forced a deciding third game with an 89–84 win in Game 2. In Game 3 less than 48 hours later, the Wildcats beat the 36ers 93–59 to win the series 2–1 and claim their sixth NBL Championship. Beal was subsequently named the series MVP after Ennis struggled to make an impact in Games 2 and 3. Beal averaged 17.6 points per game during the Grand Final series, hitting 11 three-pointers at an efficient 48%.

==== 2015–16: Seventh Championship ====
After an injury-riddled season in 2014–15 saw the Wildcats earn a Semi-final defeat, coach Trevor Gleeson was confident heading into the 2015–16 season that he had assembled the right blend of players, after conceding his side struggled with chemistry issues in 2014–15. A banged-up Perth was swept out of the playoffs in 2015 following a fourth-place finish which marked an underwhelming follow-up to its title-winning campaign in 2014. Gleeson made a conscious effort during the 2015 off-season to make sure that first and foremost, the chemistry is right. Following a large player turnover, the Wildcats were confident high-profile recruits Casey Prather and Nate Jawai – as well as back-up guard Jarrod Kenny – would be strong fits among the group dynamic.

The Wildcats were relatively injury-free in 2015–16 and finished the regular season in second place with an 18–10 record. By qualifying for the finals in 2016, the Wildcats set a record with their 30th straight season of playing finals basketball. With Jawai's presence inside, Prather's athleticism, tough defence and ability to finish at the rim and Kenny being able support captain Damian Martin admirably, they provided improvement in crucial areas. Alongside the core of Martin, Redhage, Wagstaff, Knight, Hire, Beal and Jervis, the Wildcats were successful in reaching the Grand Final, where they defeated the New Zealand Breakers in three games led by captain and Grand Final MVP Damian Martin.

==== 2016–17: Back-to-back championships ====
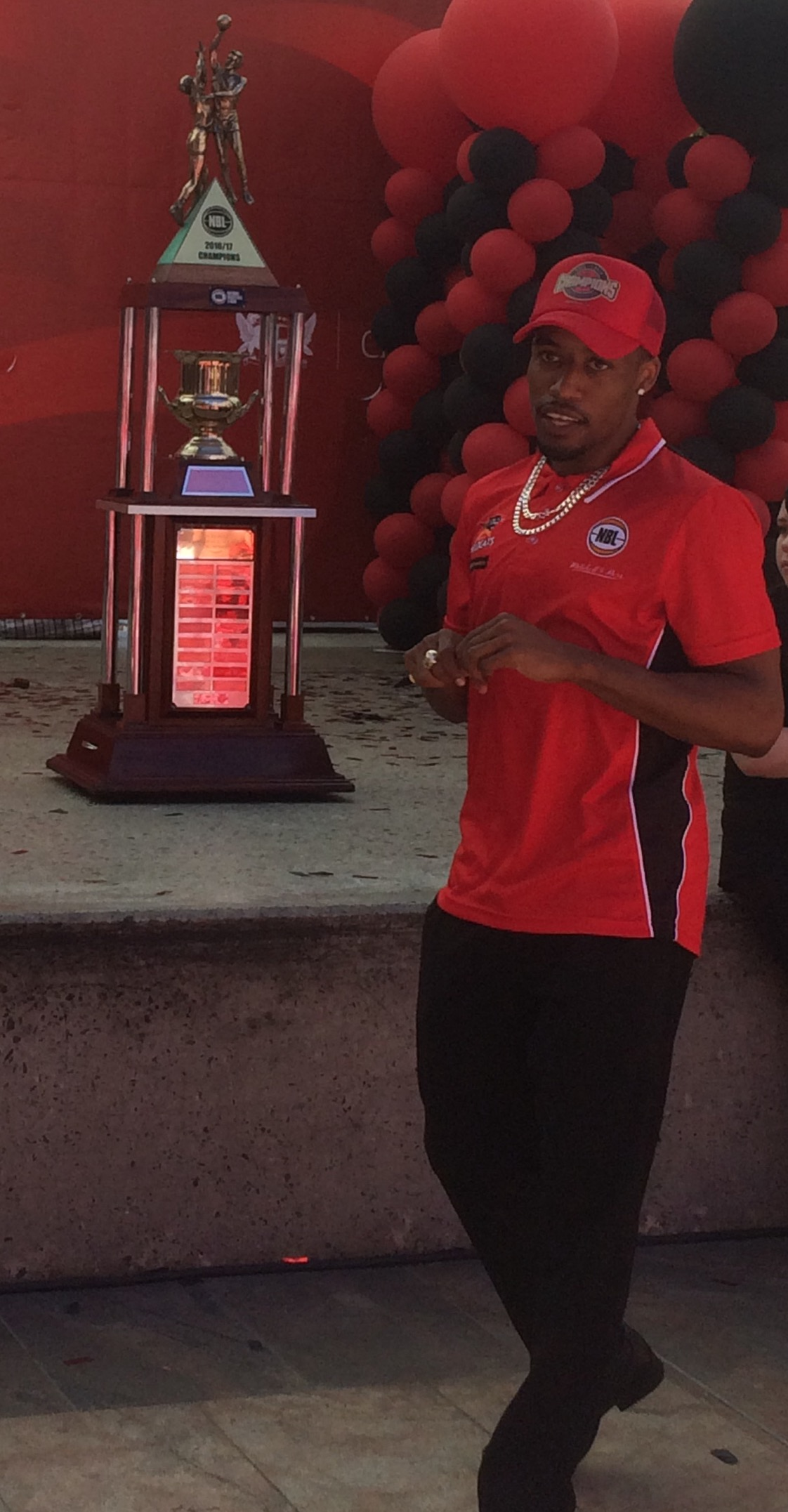
Bryce Cotton was instrumental in leading the Wildcats to their eighth championship in 2017.

The 2016 off-season saw the departure of Nate Jawai, Tom Jervis and Jermaine Beal, and the addition of Angus Brandt, Jameel McKay and Jaron Johnson. The Wildcats started the season with a 4–1 record but then slumped to last place on the ladder in December with a 7–9 record. Alongside injuries to Damian Martin, Jarrod Kenny and Matthew Knight, imports Jaron Johnson and Andre Ingram did not work out. The Wildcats were under siege at Christmas, but a win on New Year's Eve against the Illawarra Hawks and the signing of Bryce Cotton in January turned the season around. They won eight of their remaining twelve regular season games, including two must-win encounters in the final week to squeeze into the finals. From there, the Wildcats rolled through the Finals undefeated. The finals streak extended to a record 31st straight season and the 3–0 Grand Final sweep of the Illawarra Hawks saw them claim their eighth NBL Championship. The Wildcats went back-to-back for the first time since 1990/1991, while Gleeson became the first coach to guide the Wildcats to back-to-back championships. In addition, series MVP Bryce Cotton broke a 29-year-old record in Game 3 with 45 points, the most ever scored in an NBL Grand Final game. His 27.7 points per game over the Grand Final series also marked the most from any player in 20 years. Club legend Shawn Redhage retired following the season as a four-time championship player.

==== 2017–18 ====
The Wildcats reacquired the services of Grand Final MVP Bryce Cotton for the 2017–18 season, but lost two-time Club MVP Casey Prather to Melbourne United. The team's initial replacement for Prather was Devondrick Walker, but after Walker sustained a foot injury in August, the Wildcats replaced him with J. P. Tokoto. Other changes to the roster included Derek Cooke Jr. coming in to replace the outgoing Jameel McKay, and Lucas Walker stepping up from a training player role to a full-time squad member in place of the retired Shawn Redhage. The rest of the local contingent remained the same, including Matt Knight, who announced that the 2017–18 season would be his last. However, following three early-season head knocks, Knight brought forth his retirement in early November. Clint Steindl was subsequently signed as Knight's replacement.

The Wildcats started the season with a 10–3 record, before dropping to 13–9 in mid-January. They finished the regular season in third place with a 16–12 record. On the eve of their finals campaign, Cotton was named league MVP, becoming just the third Wildcat to win the award after Paul Rogers (2000) and Kevin Lisch (2012). In addition, Cotton earned All-NBL First Team honours, Tokoto earned All-NBL Second Team honours, and Martin was named the NBL's Best Defensive Player—earning the honour for a record-breaking sixth time. In Game 1 of their semi-finals series against the second-seeded Adelaide 36ers, the Wildcats were defeated 109–74, thus recording their second biggest finals loss in club history, behind only a 55-point loss in 1989 against the North Melbourne Giants. The Wildcats went on to lose 89–88 to the 36ers in Game 2 to bow out of the finals.

==== 2018–19: Ninth Championship ====
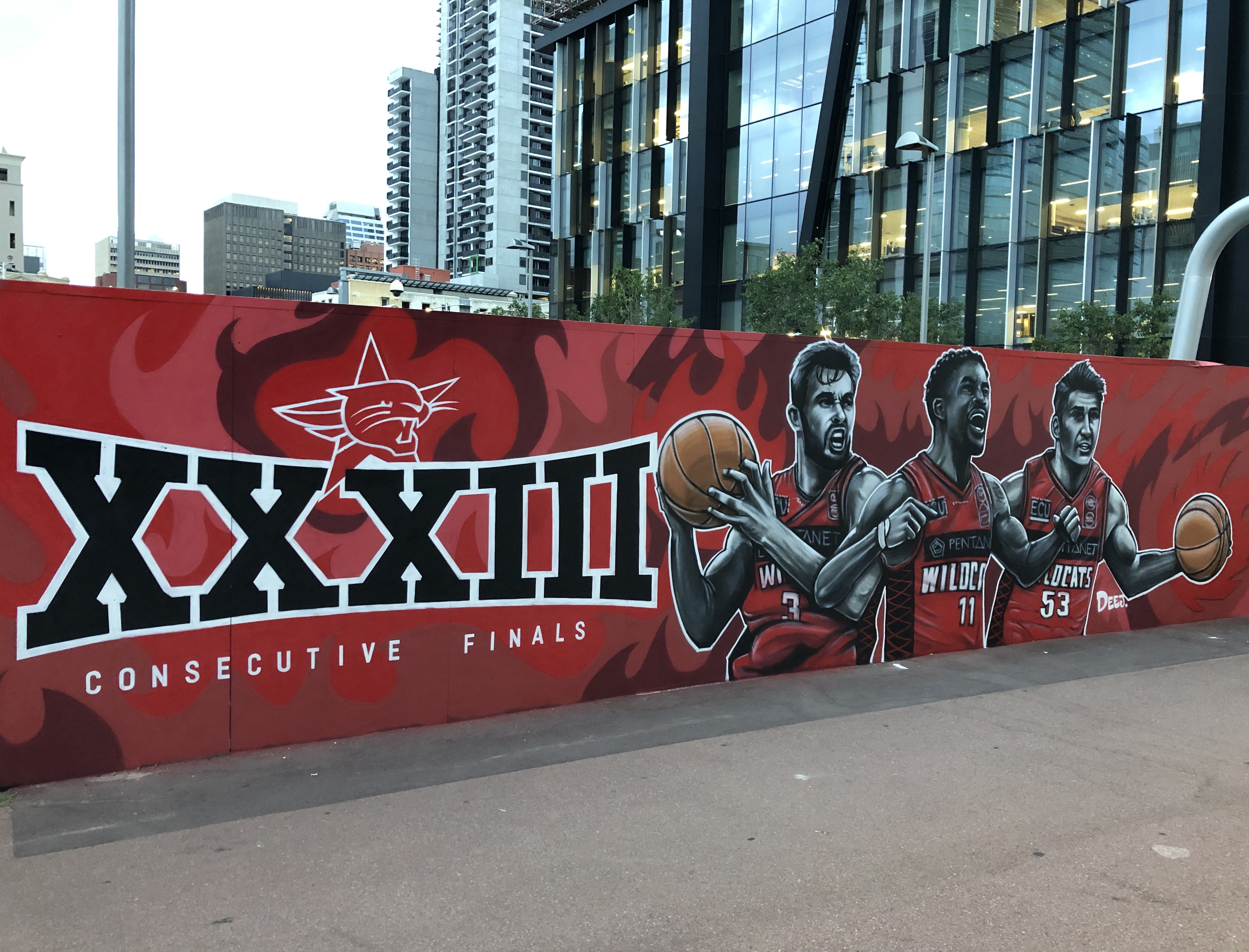
Mural in the City of Perth, commemorating the Wildcats' 33rd consecutive finals appearance

The 2018 off-season saw the Wildcats secure Bryce Cotton to a three-year deal, while acquiring the services of Nick Kay and Mitch Norton from the Illawarra Hawks. While losing championship trio Lucas Walker, Jarrod Kenny and Dexter Kernich-Drew to the Cairns Taipans, former two-time championship Wildcat Tom Jervis returned to Perth after spending the previous two seasons with the Brisbane Bullets. They also signed import Terrico White and elevated four-year development player Rhys Vague to the full-time roster. The team travelled to the United States for two pre-season games against NBA teams Utah Jazz and Denver Nuggets. where they were handed a 130–72 loss to the Jazz in their first match. This loss was cited by coach Trevor Gleeson as the catalyst to the season's success. The Wildcats started the season with a 10–1 record despite Martin, Brandt, White and Cotton being out for various periods of time with injuries. By mid-January however, the Wildcats had fallen to 12–9 after losing eight out of 10 games, leading to increasing external pressure urging them to make changes to their roster and bring in a third import. The organisation and coaches instead backed the playing group to return to form and enjoy success in the latter part of the season. In response, the team bounced back with three straight wins over Melbourne, Adelaide and Sydney, seeing them move to 15–9 and atop the ladder by late January. They won the next three as well, and despite a regular-season finale loss to Melbourne and being without Norton since 25 January with a calf injury, the Wildcats finished as minor premiers with an 18–10 record. They went on to defeat the Bullets 2–0 in the semi-finals to advance through to their 14th NBL Grand Final series, where behind Grand Final MVP Terrico White, the Wildcats defeated Melbourne United 3–1 to claim their ninth NBL championship, hoisting the trophy on the back of 11 wins from their final 13 games. Having only secured the title interstate once before—in 1990—the Wildcats' win in Melbourne was only the fourth grand final road win for any NBL team since 2009.

==== 2019–20: Tenth Championship ====
The first move of the 2019 off-season was the re-signing of four-time championship-winning coach Trevor Gleeson, who was retained by the Wildcats on a three-year deal. Next saw the re-signing of five-time championship-winning duo Damian Martin and Jesse Wagstaff, which was followed by the retention of six others from the championship-winning roster, including the return of import Terrico White. Wagstaff took on the role of vice captain for the 2019–20 season following the retirement of Greg Hire, who was replaced on the roster by Wani Swaka Lo Buluk, who was elevated to the full-time squad after spending the 2018–19 season as a development player. To replace the outgoing Angus Brandt and Tom Jervis, the Wildcats signed two new centres in import Dario Hunt and West Australian Majok Majok. The team also had a change in both assistant coaching positions with Paul Woolpert and Jacob Chance replacing the outgoing Matthew Nielsen and Adam Forde.

During pre-season, the Wildcats lost Swaka Lo Buluk to an ankle injury that saw him miss the first 17 games of the season. He was temporarily replaced in the squad by development player Nic Pozoglou. Early in the season, assistant coach Paul Woolpert, who had previously served under Gleeson during the 2014–15 season, was forced to return to the United States due to personal issues, which led to former NBA player and long-time coach Scott Roth stepping in to fill the void of lead assistant.

The team started the season with a 5–1 record, before slipping to 8–5 by the end of round 10 following back-to-back losses. The team responded with four straight wins and closed out December with a 13–6 record. However, they lost Martin for the entire month of January after he suffered a left heel injury in the final game of 2019. After losing back-to-back games to start the new year, Hunt was released and replaced with seven-year NBA veteran Miles Plumlee. With seven games remaining in the season, Plumlee had to play all seven games to qualify for the finals. Due to the demanding schedule, the Wildcats had played 12 of their first 21 games away from Perth. Plumlee's debut game also came on the road, before the team closed out the season with five of their final six games being at home. Following the addition of Plumlee, the Wildcats won six of seven games to secure a 34th consecutive finals appearance with a second-place finish and a 19–9 record.

In the semi-finals, the Wildcats defeated the Cairns Taipans 2–1 to advance through to their 15th NBL Grand Final. In the grand final series, the Wildcats took Game 1 in Sydney before the Kings levelled the series with a win in Perth. The Wildcats went on to take a 2–1 series lead with a win in Game 3 in Sydney. Due to the coronavirus outbreak, it was decided that Games 2–5 would take place behind closed doors. Following Game 3 however, the Kings refused to take part in the final two games of the series, withdrawing citing health and safety concerns. As a result of a series cancellation and with Perth up 2–1, the NBL declared the Wildcats the champions for the 2019–20 season, thus claiming their 10th NBL championship. After averaging 30.0 points, 6.0 rebounds and 4.7 assists over the three games, Cotton was named Grand Final MVP for the second time in four years, becoming the first player in Wildcats history to be named league MVP, Grand Final MVP and win a championship all in the same season.

==== 2020–21: 16th Grand Final ====
Heading into an uncertain off-season due to the COVID-19 pandemic, the NBL decided to reduce a roster spot and an import position for all teams while also introducing pay cuts on player contracts for the 2020–21 season.

While the Wildcats retained the services of Bryce Cotton on a three-year deal, they lost six-time champion and seven-year captain Damian Martin to retirement. With the departure of Nick Kay and Terrico White, the Wildcats acquired NBL veteran Todd Blanchfield and rookie import John Mooney. They also picked up Jarred Bairstow to replace Rhys Vague, and signed Kevin White to fill the empty guard position left by Martin. A preseason injury to centre Majok Majok also saw the club bring back former champion Wildcat Tom Jervis. A major off-season development was the pending Australian citizenship of Cotton and the potential of not having him classed as an import player; the Wildcats reportedly had Miles Plumlee locked in to return, but this did not eventuate due to the citizenship not being approved. Additionally, Jesse Wagstaff was named Martin's replacement as captain.

Preseason games commenced in December 2020, with the regular season scheduled for a January 2021 start. Following a trip to Brisbane to play preseason games against the Bullets, the Wildcats were forced into 14-day quarantine upon returning to Perth due to Brisbane's COVID cluster that led to state border closures. They were subsequently forced to sit out Round 1 of the regular season, with their season opener on 24 January in Round 2 seeing them defeat the South East Melbourne Phoenix at home 88–86. COVID forced home games three and four to be postponed, which was followed by the Wildcats relocating out of Western Australia until the completion of the NBL Cup. They went on to win the inaugural NBL Cup with a 7–1 record over the eight Cup games, having been away from Perth for six weeks. On 8 April, the Wildcats extended their winning streak to nine games with a 73–69 victory over the Sydney Kings. It marked the first nine-game win streak in a season for the Wildcats since January 2001. To finish the regular season, the Wildcats signed former Brisbane Bullets centre Will Magnay, but lost Cotton for the rest of the campaign with a leg injury. They finished second with a 25–11 record and qualified for their 35th consecutive finals series. In game one of the semi-final series against the Illawarra Hawks, the Wildcats lost 74–72 despite a game-high 24 points from Blanchfield. They won game two 79–71 and then game three also by a 79–71 margin to advance to their 16th NBL Grand Final. In game one of the grand final series against Melbourne United, the Wildcats lost 73–70 despite a game-high 27 points from Blanchfield. They went on to lose game two 83–74 and game three 81–76 to fall 3–0 in the series, with Melbourne winning the championship. The series saw the Wildcats hampered by injuries to Luke Travers, Clint Steindl and Mitch Norton.

=== 2021–present: New ownership ===
==== 2021–22: Finals streak ended ====
The 2021 off-season saw Sports Entertainment Group take over from Jack Bendat as owner of the Wildcats, while five-time championship-winning coach Trevor Gleeson departed for the NBA. Canadian Scott Morrison took over from Gleeson as head coach. The 2021–22 roster saw the return of Bryce Cotton and Majok Majok from injury, while Jesse Wagstaff, Mitch Norton, Todd Blanchfield, Kevin White and Luke Travers also continued on. New additions included imports Vic Law and Michael Frazier II, alongside Jack Purchase and Matt Hodgson. John Mooney departed for Japan, while Jarred Bairstow, Will Magnay and Clint Steindl all joined new NBL franchise the Tasmania JackJumpers.

The pre-season saw major knee injuries to both Blanchfield and Norton. Despite further injuries to Frazier and Hodgson, the Wildcats won their season opener 85–73 over the Adelaide 36ers. Law's 37 points set the highest score ever by a player in their Perth Wildcats debut, surpassing James Crawford's previous record of 33 points in 1987. The Wildcats went 4–1 over their first five games, which were all at home, before leaving Western Australia permanently and playing exclusively on the road for over two months due to the state's border restrictions. They moved to 7–2 by late January before dropping to 8–6 by late February. They won their next five games to conclude their away matches for the regular season as they entered a nine-game home stretch. After going 3–6 over their final nine games, which included Law missing the final two due to a season-ending ankle injury, the Wildcats' 35-year finals streak came to end as they finished fifth with a 16–12 record.

==== 2022–23: Return to finals ====
Wildcats' open-air game against the Adelaide 36ers at RAC Arena on 14 January 2023

Following the departure of Scott Morrison after one season due to family reasons, the Wildcats hired former NBL player John Rillie as head coach. New import big man duo TaShawn Thomas and Brady Manek were accompanied by former New Zealand Breakers guard Corey Webster, while 2022 NBA draft pick Luke Travers returned to the Wildcats for another season. Bryce Cotton, Majok Majok, Jesse Wagstaff, Mitch Norton and Todd Blanchfield all returned, while Kyle Zunic and Corey Shervill were elevated from development players to the main roster. The front office also experienced turnover of long-time staff while game day changes caused a stir amongst fans early in the season.

After starting the season with three straight wins, the Wildcats lost their next five. It marked the first time since 2005 that the Wildcats recorded five consecutive losses. Over the next eight games, the Wildcats went 6–2. Following a New Year's Eve win, the Wildcats released Shervill in order to sign Corey Webster's brother, Tai Webster. Tai's addition led to the reduced minutes of Blanchfield and Norton. On 14 January 2023, the Wildcats played the Adelaide 36ers in the first ever open-air game at RAC Arena, with Perth winning 112–97. Going into the regular-season finale on 5 February, the Wildcats required an 11-point victory to clinch a finals spot. They subsequently defeated the Sydney Kings 96–84 to earn sixth place with a 15–13 record.

In the play-in qualifier against the South East Melbourne Phoenix, the Wildcats won 106–99 behind Cotton's game-high 26 points and a 41-point fourth quarter. In the play-in game three days later, the Wildcats bowed out of the finals with a 91–78 loss to the Cairns Taipans.

==== 2023–24 ====
With coach John Rillie returning for a second season, the Wildcats looked for off-season stability for the first time since before the pandemic. Following the departures of veterans Todd Blanchfield and Mitch Norton, the club recruited their first Next Star in French centre Alex Sarr alongside WA youth in Ben Henshall and David Okwera. They also acquired Keanu Pinder from the Cairns Taipans, new import Jordan Usher, and Kiwi forward Hyrum Harris. Bryce Cotton, Tai Webster, Corey Webster and captain Jesse Wagstaff all returned. The team subsequently travelled to the United States in the pre-season to play two games against the NBA G League Ignite in Las Vegas. In the days leading up to the season opener, the Wildcats signed a third import in Kristian Doolittle.

The Wildcats opened the season with a 101–95 win over the Tasmania JackJumpers, with Usher scoring 35 points to set the highest score ever by a Wildcats player on NBL debut. They went on to win just two of their first seven games, with a form slump from Cotton cited as a major factor. The 2–5 record marked the club's worst start to a season since 2005–06. They broke a four-game losing streak on 4 November with a 99–88 win over the Adelaide 36ers. It was the first of six straight wins for the Wildcats, with their sixth victory coming on 1 December against the Sydney Kings behind Cotton's 41 points. The six-game win streak was ended on 8 December with an 18-point loss to the last-placed Illawarra Hawks. The Wildcats ended the calendar year in second place with an 11–7 record after going 2–1 in their week-long Christmas road trip. They had their second six-game winning streak once again ended by the Hawks in a 95–77 loss on 25 January. With a 117–88 win over the Taipans on 10 February, the Wildcats locked in second place. After losing both games in the last round, the Wildcats finished with a 17–11 record. Cotton averaged 26.6 points on 43 per cent shooting during the 13–2 run between rounds six and sixteen that set up the Wildcats for a top-two finish on the ladder. He was subsequently named league MVP for the fourth time.

In game one of the semi-finals series against the Tasmania JackJumpers, the Wildcats won 89–81 behind Pinder's game-high 25 points. They went on to lose game two 102–94 despite Cotton's game-high 26 points. In game three, the Wildcats bowed out of the finals with a 100–84 loss at home.

==== 2024–25 ====
In July 2024, Sports Entertainment Group agreed to sell 90% of their 95% shareholder ownership of the Wildcats to MT Arena Capital Investment at an estimated value of $40 million. On 14 August 2024, WA businessman Mark Arena officially became the majority owner of the Wildcats after purchasing 52.5 per cent of the club for $21 million from Sports Entertainment Group. He was set at the time to provide another payment of $15 million in 2026 to receive an extra 37.5 per cent and then buy the entire club in 2028. Arena's full purchase ended up taking place in January 2026.

The 2024 off-season saw the departure of Jordan Usher, Corey Webster, Alex Sarr and Kyle Zunic, while development player Michael Harris was upgraded to the main roster, Elijah Pepper became a new acquisition, and Spanish centre Izan Almansa replaced Sarr as the team's new Next Star. Former NBA player Dylan Windler joined the team as the third import late in the pre-season which coincided with the Wildcats entering the regular season with no injuries following a pre-season where they were undefeated across eight matches. In the season opener on 20 September, the Wildcats won 106–98 over the South East Melbourne Phoenix behind Keanu Pinder's 29 points and Bryce Cotton's 26 points. The Wildcats started the season with a 2–4 record and entered their round six match-up against the Sydney Kings without Cotton, who had been ruled out for a month with a rib injury. Behind Pinder's equal career-high 34 points, the team defeated the Kings 87–84. A week later, the Wildcats defeated the Illawarra Hawks 113–105 in a game where Jesse Wagstaff tied the club's games played record of 482. Wagstaff broke Ricky Grace's record on 3 November, playing his 483rd game in a 100–76 loss to the Phoenix in Melbourne. After missing five games, Cotton returned to the line-up on 15 November, where he scored a game-high 33 points in a 97–84 win over the Phoenix. The Wildcats entered the FIBA break with a 6–7 record. On 1 December, the Wildcats moved to 8–7 with a 123–112 win over the Breakers. In the game, Cotton scored 59 points to set the most points scored by any player since the league reverted to 40-minute games in 2009–10 and he surpassed James Crawford's all-time Wildcats scoring record of 57 in 1987. Over the next two games, Cotton had two more 40-plus point games, becoming the first NBL player since Andrew Gaze in 1991 to have three consecutive 40-point games. On 14 December, the Wildcats defeated the Cairns Taipans 128–92 to produce its largest ever score in a 40-minute game. Cotton had 44 points against the Taipans to become the third ever player after Gaze and Al Green to have four consecutive 40-point games.

Between mid December and mid January, the Wildcats had seven consecutive games on the road and won six of them. The team finished the regular season with three straight wins, including a 112–104 victory over the Adelaide 36ers in the finale behind Cotton's 49 points. It saw the Wildcats enter the post-season in third place with an 18–11 record. Cotton was named NBL MVP for the fifth time after averaging a career-high 28.6 points per game.

The Wildcats faced the fourth-placed Phoenix in the NBL Seeding Qualifier, with the game taking place at Perth High Performance Centre due to the unavailability of Perth Arena. It marked the Wildcats' first game at Perth HPC since 2012. In the game, the Wildcats won 122–105 behind Pinder's career-high 35 points, advancing them to the semi-finals. In the semi-finals against Melbourne United, the Wildcats lost game one 105–93, won game two 96–89, and lost game three 113–112.

==== 2025–26 ====
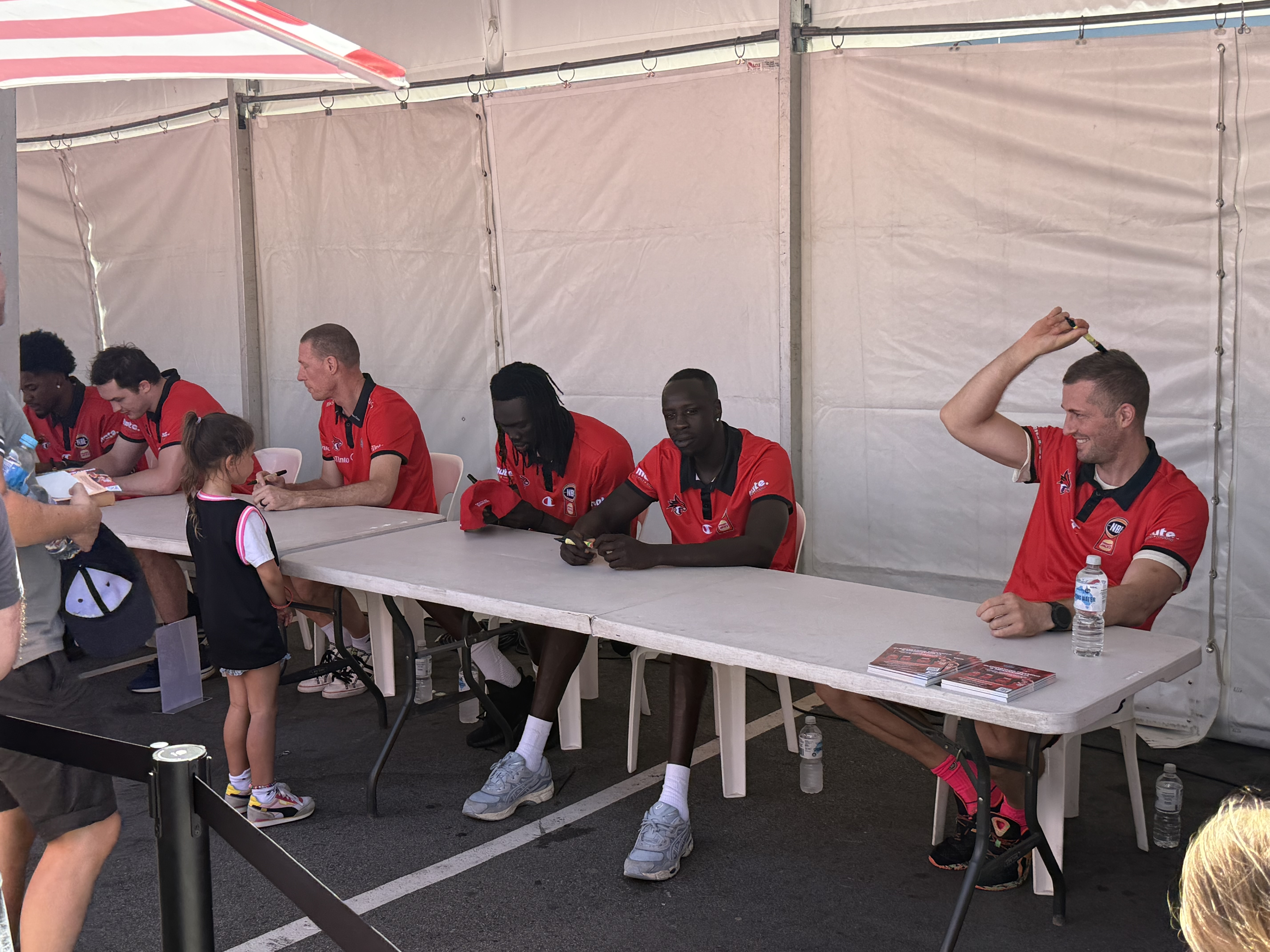
2026 Perth Wildcats Fan Day at Karrinyup Shopping Centre, featuring from left to right: David Duke Jr., Elijah Pepper, John Rillie, David Okwera, Lat Mayen and Jesse Wagstaff

The 2025 off-season saw the departure of five-time NBL MVP Bryce Cotton, with the eight-year Wildcat signing with the Adelaide 36ers. The off-season also saw the club undertake a rebrand by introducing a new logo and a new uniform colour and font.

The Wildcats re-signed import pair Kristian Doolittle and Dylan Windler, while Ben Henshall returned to the club alongside new additions in Jo Lual-Acuil, Sunday Dech and Lat Mayen. The trio's addition, alongside David Okwera, saw the roster include four players with South Sudanese heritage. Import Mason Jones joined the team late in the pre-season, but after starting the season with a 3–2 record, the Wildcats parted ways with Jones. Replacement import David Duke Jr. helped the team reach a 9–6 record. On 7 December 2025, in Bryce Cotton's first appearance in Perth as a 36er, the Wildcats lost 95–94 to Adelaide after giving up a 21-point lead. The game drew a regular-season record crowd of 13,661. On 28 December against the 36ers in Adelaide, Duke suffered a serious elbow injury that saw the club look to recruit an injury replacement. By early January, the Wildcats had accumulated a 2–7 record against top four teams and a 11–3 record against the bottom five teams. With a replacement not eventuating, the club backed in the roster with the belief that Duke would be able to return sooner than expected. With Duke sidelined, guards Henshall, Dech, Dontae Russo-Nance and Elijah Pepper all received increased playing time. The Wildcats finished the regular season in fourth place with a 21–12 record. In the Seeding Qualifier, the Wildcats lost 111–94 to the South East Melbourne Phoenix. They went on to defeat Melbourne United 95–77 in the Play-In Game to advance to the semi-finals. In game one of the semi-finals series against the Sydney Kings, the Wildcats lost 105–104. They went on to bow out of the playoffs with an 89–75 loss in game two.

==== 2026–27 ====
The 2026 off-season saw the delayed signing of a third import to complement returning imports Kristian Doolittle and Dylan Windler, with Elijah Pepper and new recruit Anthony Dell'Orso subsequently handed point guard duties during the pre-season. Less than a week from the regular-season opener, the Wildcats signed former NBA player Brandon Knight as the third import. Knight's delayed arrival to Perth left the Wildcats without a genuine point guard over their first three games; despite this, the team recorded a 2–1 record. After reaching a 4–1 record with four straight wins, the Wildcats fell to a 5–5 record following a three-game losing streak. A fourth straight defeat on 8 November to the Cairns Taipans at home saw the Wildcats drop to a 5–6 record.

== Season by season ==
NBL champions	League champions	Runners-up	Finals berth

Season	Tier	League	Regular season					Post-season	Head coach	Captain	Club MVP
Season	Tier	League	Finish	Played	Wins	Losses	Win %	Post-season	Head coach	Captain	Club MVP
Westate Wildcats
1982	1	NBL	10th	26	10	16	.385	Did not qualify	Henry Daigle	Mike Ellis	Tim Evans
1983	1	NBL	7th	22	6	16	.273	Did not qualify	Gordon Ellis	Mike Ellis	Mike Ellis
Perth Wildcats
1984	1	NBL	8th	23	3	20	.130	Did not qualify	Lynn Massey	Mike Ellis	Mike Ellis
1985	1	NBL	8th	26	13	13	.500	Did not qualify	Jay Brehmer	Mike Ellis	Dan Clausen
1986	1	NBL	12th	26	8	18	.308	Did not qualify	Jay Brehmer	Mike Ellis	Mike Ellis
1987	1	NBL	4th	26	19	7	.731	Won elimination final (Canberra) 101–96; Won semifinals (Adelaide) 2–1; Lost NBL finals (Brisbane) 0–2	Cal Bruton	Mike Ellis	James Crawford
1988	1	NBL	6th	24	13	11	.542	Won elimination final (Brisbane) 113–98; Lost semifinals (North Melbourne) 1–2	Cal Bruton	Mike Ellis	James Crawford
1989	1	NBL	3rd	24	16	8	.667	Won elimination finals (Adelaide) 2–1; Lost semifinals (North Melbourne) 1–2	Alan Black	Mike Ellis	Kendal Pinder
1990	1	NBL	5th	26	17	9	.654	Won elimination finals (Melbourne) 2–0; Won semifinals (North Melbourne) 2–1; Won NBL finals (Brisbane) 2–1	Alan Black; Cal Bruton	Mike Ellis	James Crawford
1991	1	NBL	1st	26	22	4	.846	Won semifinals (Adelaide) 2–0; Won NBL finals (Eastside) 2–1	Murray Arnold	Mike Ellis	Ricky Grace
1992	1	NBL	6th	24	12	12	.500	Lost quarterfinals (Melbourne) 1–2	Murray Arnold	Mike Ellis	James Crawford
1993	1	NBL	1st	26	21	5	.808	Won quarterfinals (North Melbourne) 2–1; Won semifinals (Brisbane) 2–1; Lost NBL finals (Melbourne) 1–2	Adrian Hurley	Andrew Vlahov	Scott Fisher
1994	1	NBL	6th	26	16	10	.615	Lost quarterfinals (S.E. Melbourne) 0–2	Adrian Hurley	Andrew Vlahov	Scott Fisher
1995	1	NBL	1st	26	19	7	.731	Won quarterfinals (Melbourne) 2–1; Won semifinals (Adelaide) 2–0; Won NBL finals (North Melbourne) 2–1	Adrian Hurley	Andrew Vlahov	Andrew Vlahov
1996	1	NBL	3rd	26	16	10	.615	Lost quarterfinals (Adelaide) 1–2	Adrian Hurley	Andrew Vlahov	Andrew Vlahov
1997	1	NBL	4th	30	17	13	.567	Won elimination finals (Brisbane) 2–0; Lost semifinals (S.E. Melbourne) 0–2	Adrian Hurley	Andrew Vlahov	Ricky Grace
1998	1	NBL	3rd	30	17	13	.567	Won elimination finals (Wollongong) 2–0; Lost semifinals (Adelaide) 0–2	Alan Black	Andrew Vlahov	Ricky Grace
1998–99	1	NBL	6th	26	13	13	.500	Lost qualifying finals (Adelaide) 0–2	Alan Black	Andrew Vlahov	Ricky Grace
1999–2000	1	NBL	3rd	28	22	6	.786	Won elimination finals (West Sydney) 2–1; Won semifinals (Townsville) 2–1; Won NBL finals (Victoria) 2–0	Alan Black	Andrew Vlahov	Paul Rogers
2000–01	1	NBL	3rd	28	21	7	.750	Lost qualifying finals (Wollongong) 1–2	Alan Black	Andrew Vlahov	Ricky Grace
2001–02	1	NBL	2nd	30	17	13	.567	Lost qualifying finals (West Sydney) 0–2	Alan Black	Andrew Vlahov	Ricky Grace
2002–03	1	NBL	2nd	30	22	8	.733	Won qualifying finals (Adelaide) 2–1; Won semifinals (Wollongong) 2–0; Lost NBL finals (Sydney) 0–2	Alan Black	Ricky Grace	Rob Feaster
2003–04	1	NBL	7th	33	15	18	.455	Lost elimination final (Cairns) 96–103	Mike Ellis	Ricky Grace	Rashad Tucker
2004–05	1	NBL	7th	32	17	15	.531	Lost elimination final (Melbourne) 88–108	Scott Fisher	Ricky Grace	Rosell Ellis
2005–06	1	NBL	7th	32	16	16	.500	Won elimination final (Brisbane) 96–91; Won quarterfinal (Wollongong) 121–101; Lost semifinals (Melbourne) 0–2	Scott Fisher	Tony Ronaldson	Shawn Redhage
2006–07	1	NBL	3rd	33	23	10	.697	Lost quarterfinal (Cairns) 78–82	Scott Fisher	Paul Rogers	Shawn Redhage
2007–08	1	NBL	4th	30	18	12	.600	Won quarterfinal (Townsville) 96–78; Lost semifinals (Sydney) 1–2	Scott Fisher	Paul Rogers	Shawn Redhage
2008–09	1	NBL	4th	30	17	13	.567	Lost elimination final (Townsville) 96–103	Conner Henry	Paul Rogers	Shawn Redhage
2009–10	1	NBL	1st	28	17	11	.607	Won semifinals (Gold Coast) 2–0; Won NBL finals (Wollongong) 2–1	Rob Beveridge	Shawn Redhage	Shawn Redhage
2010–11	1	NBL	4th	28	16	12	.571	Lost semifinals (New Zealand) 1–2	Rob Beveridge	Shawn Redhage; Brad Robbins	Shawn Redhage; Kevin Lisch
2011–12	1	NBL	2nd	28	19	9	.679	Won semifinals (Gold Coast) 2–1; Lost NBL finals (New Zealand) 1–2	Rob Beveridge	Shawn Redhage; Brad Robbins	Kevin Lisch
2012–13	1	NBL	2nd	28	22	6	.786	Won semifinals (Wollongong) 2–0; Lost NBL finals (New Zealand) 0–2	Rob Beveridge	Shawn Redhage; Damian Martin	Kevin Lisch
2013–14	1	NBL	1st	28	21	7	.750	Won semifinals (Wollongong) 2–0; Won NBL finals (Adelaide) 2–1	Trevor Gleeson	Damian Martin	James Ennis
2014–15	1	NBL	4th	28	16	12	.571	Lost semifinals (Cairns) 0–2	Trevor Gleeson	Damian Martin	Jermaine Beal
2015–16	1	NBL	2nd	28	18	10	.643	Won semifinals (Illawarra) 2–1; Won NBL finals (New Zealand) 2–1	Trevor Gleeson	Damian Martin	Casey Prather
2016–17	1	NBL	3rd	28	15	13	.536	Won semifinals (Cairns) 2–0; Won NBL finals (Illawarra) 3–0	Trevor Gleeson	Damian Martin	Casey Prather
2017–18	1	NBL	3rd	28	16	12	.571	Lost semifinals (Adelaide) 0–2	Trevor Gleeson	Damian Martin	Bryce Cotton
2018–19	1	NBL	1st	28	18	10	.643	Won semifinals (Brisbane) 2–0; Won NBL finals (Melbourne) 3–1	Trevor Gleeson	Damian Martin	Bryce Cotton
2019–20	1	NBL	2nd	28	19	9	.679	Won semifinals (Cairns) 2–1; Won NBL finals (Sydney) 2–1	Trevor Gleeson	Damian Martin	Bryce Cotton
2020–21	1	NBL	2nd	36	25	11	.694	Won semifinals (Illawarra) 2–1; Lost NBL finals (Melbourne) 0–3	Trevor Gleeson	Jesse Wagstaff	John Mooney
2021–22	1	NBL	5th	28	16	12	.571	Did not qualify	Scott Morrison	Jesse Wagstaff	Bryce Cotton
2022–23	1	NBL	6th	28	15	13	.536	Won play-in qualifier (S.E. Melbourne) 106–99; Lost play-in game (Cairns) 78–91	John Rillie	Jesse Wagstaff	Bryce Cotton
2023–24	1	NBL	2nd	28	17	11	.607	Lost semifinals (Tasmania) 1–2	John Rillie	Jesse Wagstaff	Bryce Cotton
2024–25	1	NBL	3rd	29	18	11	.621	Won seeding qualifier (S.E. Melbourne) 122–105; Lost semifinals (Melbourne) 1–2	John Rillie	Jesse Wagstaff	Bryce Cotton
2025–26	1	NBL	4th	33	21	12	.636	Lost seeding qualifier (S.E. Melbourne) 94–111; Won play-in game (Melbourne) 95–77; Lost semifinals (Sydney) 0–2	John Rillie	Jesse Wagstaff	Kristian Doolittle
Regular season record				1259	755	504	.600	6 regular season champions			
Finals record				165	89	76	.539	10 NBL championships			

As of the end of the 2025–26 season

*Note: In 1983 and 1984, the NBL was split into Eastern and Western divisions during the regular season.

Source: Perth Wildcats Year by Year

=== Summary ===
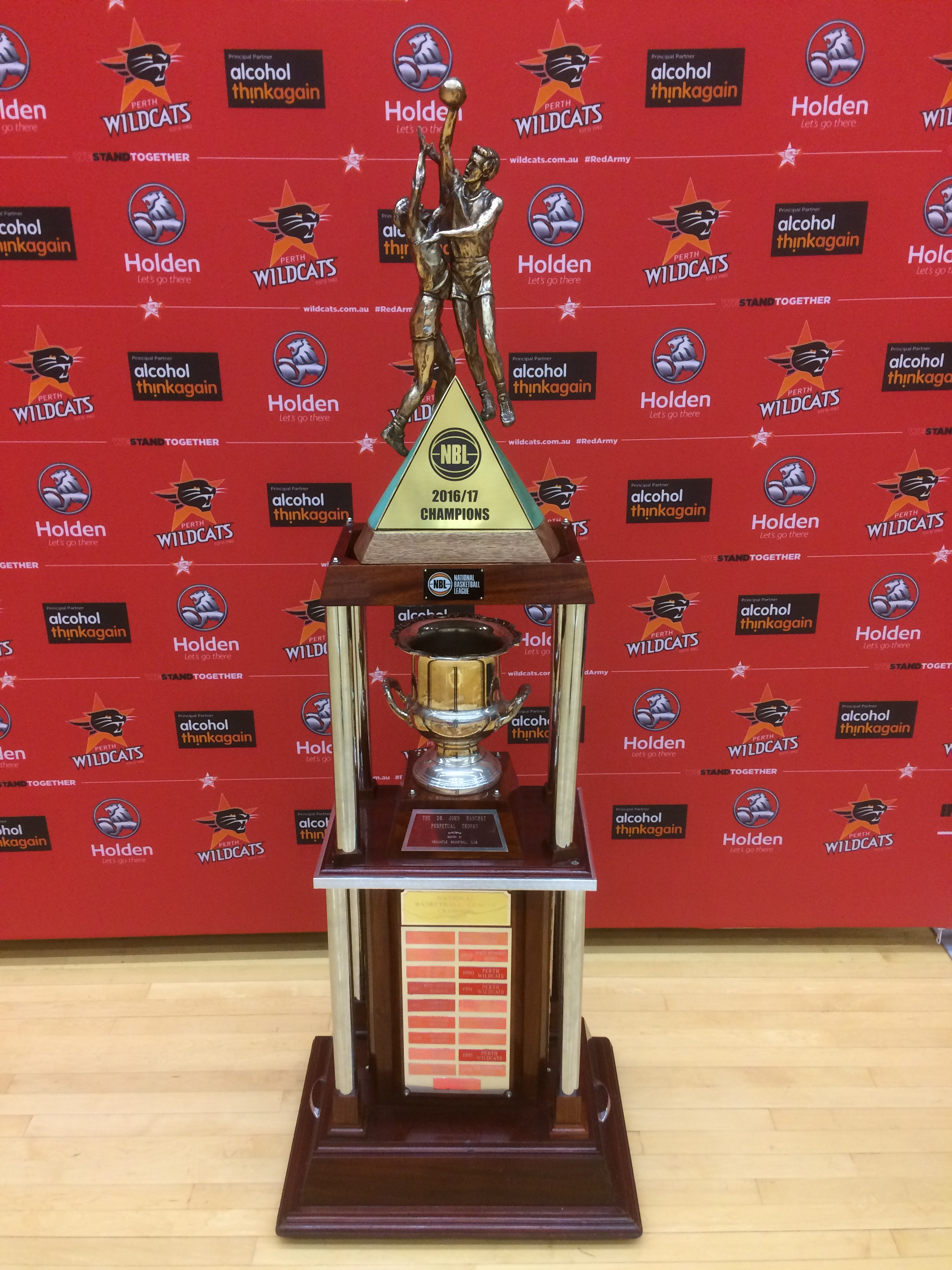
The 2016/17 championship trophy

After three years of finals action that included a losing grand final series in 1987, the team won back-to-back titles in 1990 and 1991 behind the likes of Ricky Grace, James Crawford and Mike Ellis, and coaches Cal Bruton and Murray Arnold. It took four more years for the team's third NBL title in 1995, with coach Adrian Hurley and captain Andrew Vlahov leading the way. Five more years elapsed before the next championship came in the 1999/2000 season. Behind coach Alan Black and centre Paul Rogers, and veterans Vlahov, Grace and Scott Fisher still around, the Wildcats won their fourth title.

A large championship drought occurred between 2000/01 and 2008/09, but the Wildcats still made the finals each season.

In 2009/10, the Wildcats won their league-best fifth championship behind coach Rob Beveridge and players Kevin Lisch, Shawn Redhage and Damian Martin. Their sixth championship came in 2013/14 behind coach Trevor Gleeson and imports Jermaine Beal and James Ennis. Their seventh championship came in 2015/16, as Gleeson became the first Wildcats coach to win multiple championships. With their eighth title coming in 2016/17, the Wildcats won back-to-back championships for the first time since 1990/1991. Gleeson became the first coach to guide the Wildcats to consecutive championships while trio Damian Martin, Shawn Redhage and Jesse Wagstaff equaled Ricky Grace's franchise record of winning four championships. In 2018/19, Martin and Wagstaff became the only players in NBL history to win five championships at the one club. In 2019/20, Martin and Wagstaff joined C. J. Bruton and David Stiff as the NBL's only six-time champions and the only players to be able to do that at one club. Additionally, Gleeson attained his fifth NBL championship, making him the second-most successful coach in league history behind six-time winner Brian Goorjian.

=== Finals appearance record (1987–2021) ===
The Perth Wildcats' run of 35 straight NBL finals appearances between 1987 and 2021 is unmatched in major Australian professional sports. The most consecutive finals reached in VFL/AFL football is 13 by the Hawthorn Football Club between 1982 and 1994, while the NRL's St. George Illawarra Dragons made 23 consecutive finals appearances between 1951 and 1973.

In the major North American sports, the Edmonton Eskimos of the Canadian Football League qualified for the playoffs for 34 consecutive years between 1972 and 2005. In American sport, the Boston Bruins of the National Hockey League made 29 consecutive playoff appearances between 1967/68 and 1995/96, while the Philadelphia 76ers (as the Syracuse Nationals) and San Antonio Spurs both made the NBA playoffs 22 straight seasons.

Israeli professional basketball club Maccabi Tel Aviv is believed to be the world record holder for most consecutive post-season appearances, with their 44th appearance coming in 2024/25.

== Arena history ==
- Perry Lakes Basketball Stadium (1982–1986)
- Superdrome / Challenge Stadium / Perth HPC (1987–1989; 2002–2012; 2025)
- Perth Entertainment Centre (1990–2002)
- Burswood Dome (1994; 2004)
- Goldfields Basketball Stadium (2004)
- RAC Arena (2012–present)

== Players ==
See also: Perth Wildcats Complete Player List

=== Current roster ===
Note: Flags indicate national team eligibility at FIBA-sanctioned events. Players may hold other non-FIBA nationalities not displayed.

Perth Wildcats roster
Players
Coaches

Pos.	No.	Nat.	Name	Ht.	Wt.
C	0	(South Sudan)	Lual-Acuil, Jo (injured)	2.11 m (6 ft 11 in)	103 kg (227 lb)
G/F	1	(Australia)	Nielsen, Blake (injured) (DP)	2.00 m (6 ft 7 in)
G	2	(Australia)	Dell'Orso, Anthony	1.98 m (6 ft 6 in)	93 kg (205 lb)
G/F	3	(United States)	Windler, Dylan (I)	1.98 m (6 ft 6 in)	85 kg (187 lb)
F	5	(United States)	Doolittle, Kristian (I)	2.01 m (6 ft 7 in)	105 kg (231 lb)
G	8	(Australia)	Kopa, Tana (DP)	1.98 m (6 ft 6 in)
G	9	(Australia)	Rillie, Jaron	1.91 m (6 ft 3 in)	84 kg (185 lb)
G	13	(Australia)	Sam, Marley (DP)	1.80 m (5 ft 11 in)
G	17	(United States)	Knight, Brandon (I)	1.88 m (6 ft 2 in)	83 kg (183 lb)
F	24	(Australia)	Wagstaff, Jesse (C)	2.03 m (6 ft 8 in)	103 kg (227 lb)
F	25	(Australia)	Huefner, Cameron	2.03 m (6 ft 8 in)	104 kg (229 lb)
C	26	(Australia)	Brandt, Angus	2.08 m (6 ft 10 in)	116 kg (256 lb)
F	27	(Australia)	Higgins-Titsha, Alex	2.01 m (6 ft 7 in)	81 kg (179 lb)
G	33	(United States)	Whitt, Jimmy (IN)	1.90 m (6 ft 3 in)	79 kg (174 lb)
G	40	(Australia)	Pepper, Elijah	1.93 m (6 ft 4 in)	91 kg (201 lb)

Head coach

- (Australia) John Rillie

Assistant coach(es)

- (United States) Derrick Alston
- (United States) Ben Peterson
- (New Zealand) Aaron Young

Strength & conditioning coach(es)

- (Australia) Josh Cavanagh

Legend

- (C) Team captain
- (DP) Development player
- (I) Import player
- (SRP) Special restricted player
- (NS) Next Star player
- Injured

- Roster
Updated: 21 October 2026

=== Notable players ===
- (Spain) Izan Almansa
- (United States) Jermaine Beal
- (Australia) Angus Brandt
- (Australia) C. J. Bruton
- (United States) Cal Bruton
- (Australia) Martin Cattalini
- (United States) Bryce Cotton
- (United States) James Crawford
- (Australia) / (South Sudan) Sunday Dech
- (United States) Kristian Doolittle
- (Australia) Mike Ellis
- (United States) James Ennis III
- (Australia) Scott Fenton
- (Australia) Scott Fisher
- (United States) Michael Frazier II
- (Australia) Chris Goulding
- (Australia) Ricky Grace
- (Australia) Greg Hire
- (United States) Andre Ingram
- (Australia) Nathan Jawai
- (Australia) Tom Jervis
- (United States) Jaron Johnson
- (United States) Mason Jones
- (Australia) Nick Kay
- (New Zealand) Jarrod Kenny
- (Australia) Matt Knight
- (United States) Vic Law
- (United States) Kevin Lisch
- (Australia) Luc Longley
- (Australia) / (South Sudan) Majok Majok
- (Australia) Damian Martin
- (United States) Jameel McKay
- (United States) John Mooney
- (Australia) Mitch Norton
- (Australia) Keanu Pinder
- (The Bahamas) Kendal Pinder
- (United States) Miles Plumlee
- (United States) Casey Prather
- (Australia) Shawn Redhage
- (Australia) Brad Robbins
- (Australia) Paul Rogers
- (Australia) Tony Ronaldson
- (Australia) Liam Rush
- (France) Alex Sarr
- (Australia) Clint Steindl
- (Australia) Anthony Stewart
- (Australia) Wani Swaka Lo Buluk
- (Australia) Luke Travers
- (United States) / (Australia) Drake U'u
- (Australia) Andrew Vlahov
- (Australia) Jesse Wagstaff
- (Australia) Lucas Walker
- (Australia) Eric Watterson
- (United States) Terrico White
- (United States) Dylan Windler

=== Retired numbers ===
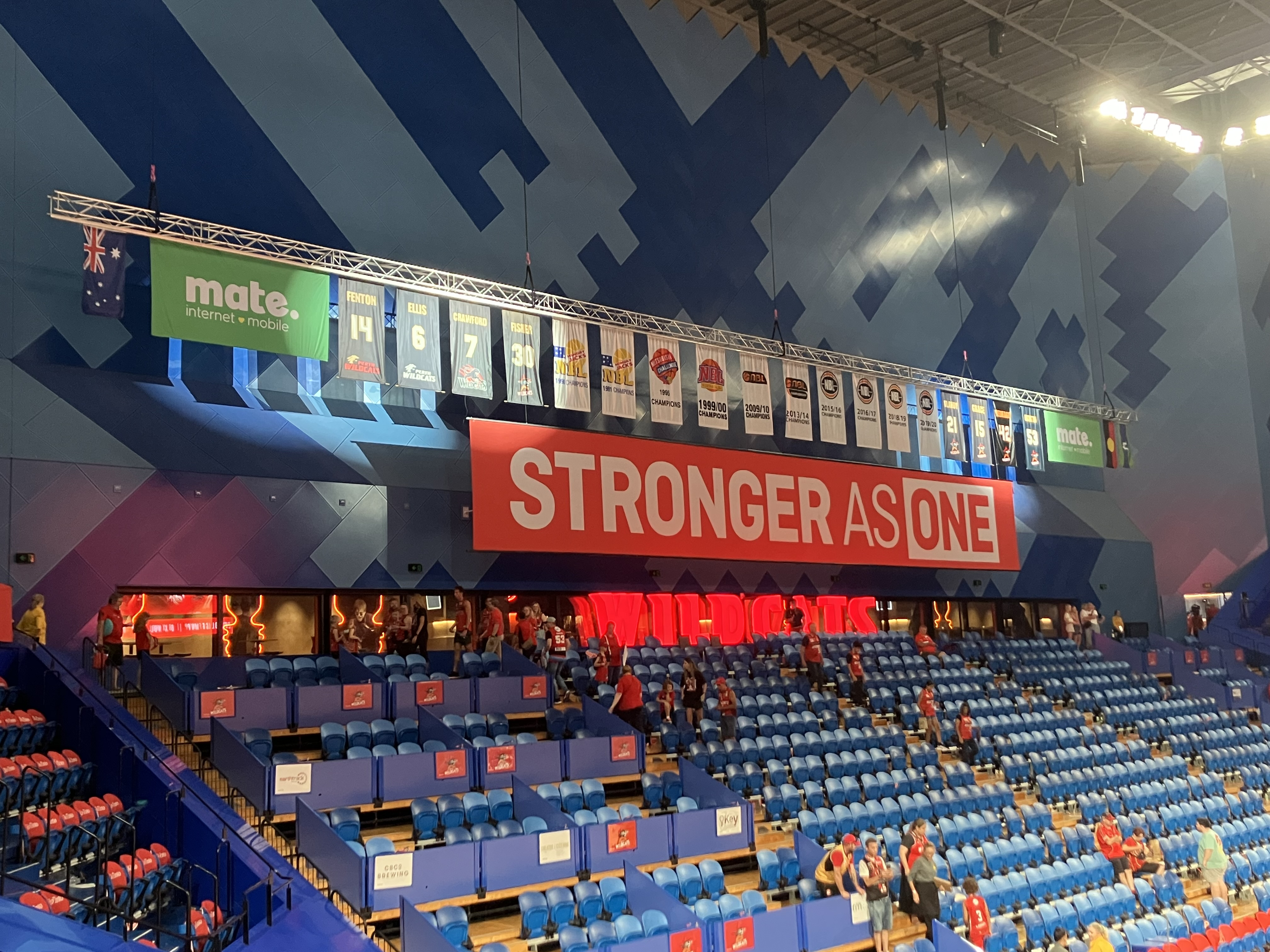
The Wildcats' championship banners and retired numbers hanging at RAC Arena in February 2024

As of February 2024, a player must have played 200 games for the club and won two championships in order to be considered for jersey retirement.

Perth Wildcats retired numbers
No.	Player	Position	Tenure
6	Mike Ellis	G	1982–1992
7	James Crawford	F/C	1987–1999
14 ^{1}	Scott Fenton	G	1988–1989
15	Ricky Grace	G	1990–2005
21	Andrew Vlahov	F	1991–2002
30	Scott Fisher	F	1993–2002
42	Shawn Redhage	F	2005–2017
53	Damian Martin	G	2009–2020

Notes:

- ^{1} Scott Fenton's No. 14 singlet was retired following his death in a car crash on 21 August 1989

=== 30th Anniversary All-Star Team ===
On 4 February 2013, the Wildcats announced their 30th Anniversary All-Star Team.

- Coach: Adrian Hurley
- General Manager: Cal Bruton

Pos.	Starter	Bench
C	James Crawford	Paul Rogers
PF	Scott Fisher	Kendal Pinder
SF	Andrew Vlahov (c)	Shawn Redhage
SG	Kevin Lisch	James Harvey
PG	Ricky Grace	Mike Ellis (c)

=== 40th Anniversary Team ===
In February 2022, the Wildcats announced their 40th Anniversary Team.

- Coach: Trevor Gleeson

Pos.	Starter	Bench
C	James Crawford	Paul Rogers
PF	Andrew Vlahov	Nick Kay
SF	Shawn Redhage	Scott Fisher
SG	Bryce Cotton	Kevin Lisch
PG	Ricky Grace	Damian Martin (c)

=== Hall of Fame ===
In March 2023, the Wildcats introduced a Club Hall of Fame to recognise past players, coaches and support staff. All players with retired numbers were automatically inducted alongside players Paul Rogers and Eric Watterson and former owner Bob Williams.

In February 2024, former owner Kerry Stokes, championship-winning head coach Adrian Hurley and long-time game-night producer Raquel Muia became the second group of Wildcats Hall of Fame inductees.

In February 2025, former owner Jack Bendat and four-time NBL champion and former vice-captain Greg Hire were added to the Hall of Fame.

In February 2026, Martin Cattalini was added to the Hall of Fame.

Perth Wildcats Hall of Fame
Name	Status	Year Inducted
Jack Bendat	Executive	2025
Martin Cattalini	Player	2026
James Crawford	Player	2023
Mike Ellis	Player	2023
Scott Fenton	Player	2023
Scott Fisher	Player	2023
Ricky Grace	Player	2023
Greg Hire	Player	2025
Adrian Hurley	Coach	2024
Raquel Muia	Staff	2024
Shawn Redhage	Player	2023
Kerry Stokes	Executive	2024
Paul Rogers	Player	2023
Andrew Vlahov	Player	2023
Eric Watterson	Player	2023
Bob Williams	Executive	2023

== Honour roll ==
NBL Championships:	10 (1990, 1991, 1995, 2000, 2010, 2014, 2016, 2017, 2019, 2020)
Regular Season Champions:	6 (1991, 1993, 1995, 2010, 2014, 2019)
NBL Finals appearances:	39 (1987–2021, 2023, 2024, 2025, 2026)
NBL Grand Final appearances:	16 (1987, 1990, 1991, 1993, 1995, 2000, 2003, 2010, 2012, 2013, 2014, 2016, 2017, 2019, 2020, 2021)
NBL Cup winners:	1 (2021)
NBL Most Valuable Players:	Paul Rogers (2000), Kevin Lisch (2012), Bryce Cotton (2018, 2020, 2021, 2024, 2025)
NBL Grand Final MVPs:	Ricky Grace (1990, 1993), Pete Hansen (1991), Andrew Vlahov (1995), Marcus Timmons (2000), Kevin Lisch (2010), Jermaine Beal (2014), Damian Martin (2016), Bryce Cotton (2017, 2020), Terrico White (2019)
All-NBL First Team:	James Crawford (1987), Ricky Grace (1991, 2001, 2002, 2003), Andrew Vlahov (1992, 1995), Paul Rogers (2000, 2002), Shawn Redhage (2008, 2010), Damian Martin (2011), Kevin Lisch (2012, 2013), Matthew Knight (2013), James Ennis (2014), Casey Prather (2017), Bryce Cotton (2018, 2019, 2020, 2021, 2022, 2023, 2024, 2025), Nick Kay (2019, 2020), John Mooney (2021), Vic Law (2022)
All-NBL Second Team:	Scott Fisher (1993), Ricky Grace (1993), Andrew Vlahov (1996), Paul Rogers (2001, 2007), Rob Feaster (2003), Shawn Redhage (2006, 2007, 2009), Damian Martin (2013, 2014), Jermaine Beal (2014), Matthew Knight (2015, 2016), J. P. Tokoto (2018)
All-NBL Third Team:	Andrew Vlahov (1993, 1994), James Crawford (1994), Ricky Grace (1995, 1998), Rashad Tucker (2004), Rosell Ellis (2005), Paul Rogers (2008), Shawn Redhage (2011, 2013), Damian Martin (2012), Jesse Wagstaff (2012)
NBL Coach of the Year:	Murray Arnold (1991), Trevor Gleeson (2021)
NBL Rookie of the Year:	Andrew Vlahov (1991), Jesse Wagstaff (2010), Tom Jervis (2014)
NBL Best Defensive Player:	Damian Martin (2011, 2012, 2013, 2014, 2015, 2018)
NBL Most Improved Player:	James Harvey (2001), Matt Burston (2003), Peter Crawford (2005)
NBL Best Sixth Man:	Stephen Black (2003), Jesse Wagstaff (2012)
Fans MVP:	Bryce Cotton (2019, 2021, 2024, 2025)

Source: Perth Wildcats Achievements

== Games against NBA teams ==
Network Ten

20 October 1995

boxscore

Perth Wildcats (Australia)	72–116	(United States) Houston Rockets

London Arena, London, England
Attendance: not available
Referees: not available

ESPN2

29 September 2018
19:00

boxscore

Perth Wildcats (Australia)	72–130	(United States) Utah Jazz
Scoring by quarter: 13–44, 21–31, 11–25, 27–30
Pts: Cotton 14; Rebs: Vague 7 Asts: Kay 3		Pts: Allen 19; Rebs: Bradley, Gobert 9 Asts: Exum 6

Vivint Smart Home Arena, Salt Lake City, United States
Attendance: 17,685
Referees: Rodney Mott, Tre Maddox, Brett Nansel

ESPN2

5 October 2018
19:00

boxscore

Perth Wildcats (Australia)	88–96	(United States) Denver Nuggets
Scoring by quarter: 16–27, 25–24, 29–24, 18–21
Pts: Cotton 33; Rebs: Kay 8 Asts: Norton 4		Pts: Morris 15; Rebs: Millsap 9 Asts: Morris 9

Pepsi Center, Denver, United States
Attendance: 9,812
Referees: Josh Tiven, Jason Goldenberg, Nick Buchert
