= Cal Bruton =

American-born Australian basketball player and coach

Goldfields Giants
- Title: Head coach
- League: NBL1 West

Personal information
- Born: 29 September 1954 (age 72) New York City, New York, U.S.
- Listed height: 175 cm (5 ft 9 in)
- Listed weight: 80 kg (176 lb)

Career information
- High school: Springfield Gardens (Queens, New York)
- College: Wichita State (1972–1976)
- NBA draft: 1976: undrafted
- Playing career: 1979–1992
- Position: Guard
- Coaching career: 1982–2007

Career history

Playing
- 1979: Brisbane Bullets
- 1980–1984: Geelong Supercats
- 1985–1986: Brisbane Bullets
- 1987–1989: Perth Wildcats
- 1992: Hobart Devils

Coaching
- 1982–1984: Geelong Supercats
- 1987–1988; 1990: Perth Wildcats
- 1996: Hobart Devils
- 1999–2003: Canberra Cannons
- 2007: West Sydney Razorbacks
- 2027–: Goldfields Giants

Career highlights
- As player: NBL champion (1985); 2× All-NBL Team (1983, 1984); NBL scoring champion (1979); NBL's 20th Anniversary Team (1998); NBL's 25th Anniversary Team (2003); SEABL champion (1981); First-team All-MVC (1976); As coach: NBL champion (1990); NBL Coach of the Year (1982)

Calvin Thomas Bruton, OAM (born 29 September 1954) is an American-born Australian former professional basketball player and current coach who is the head coach of the Goldfields Giants men's team in the NBL1 West. He has been an integral part of the National Basketball League (NBL) since its inception. Bruton won an NBL championship with the Brisbane Bullets in 1985, was a two-time member of the All-NBL First Team while playing for the Geelong Supercats and was named NBL Coach of the Year while he was a player-coach for the Supercats in 1982. He also won a second NBL championship while coaching the Perth Wildcats in 1990. As a result, Bruton became one of the first inductees into the NBL Hall of Fame when it opened in 1998. He acquired Australian citizenship and played for the Australian national basketball team.

== Playing career ==
=== High school and college career ===
Bruton was a basketball playground legend from Jamaica, Queens in New York City. He played his high school basketball at Springfield Gardens. Bruton played college basketball for the Wichita State Shockers. On 20 November 1975, he pled no contest to a theft charge in relation to his possession of a stolen vehicle and was placed on a two-year probation. Bruton believed that the incident "put a damper" on his professional career as he had been viewed "as one of the best little men in the country" prior to his case. He averaged 12.9 points per game during his senior season and was selected to the All-Missouri Valley Conference (MVC) first-team in 1976.

Bruton returned to his native New York City after his collegiate career ended in 1976 and played in local tournaments including at Rucker Park. He also helped to coach the basketball team at his alma mater, Springfield Gardens. Off the court, Bruton started drinking alcohol and using drugs which resulted in him being hospitalised. His childhood friend, professional basketball player Ricky Marsh, helped Bruton recover and gave him money to help him move back to Wichita, where he returned in June 1977.

In July 1977, Bruton was invited to a free agent camp held by the San Antonio Spurs of the National Basketball Association (NBA). His performance saw him return to their veterans' camp. On 4 August 1977, Bruton signed a one-year deal with the Spurs. On 15 October, he was the last player waived by the Spurs before the start of the 1977–78 NBA season; the decision was between him and recent draft pick Scott Sims. Bruton instead found a job as a hauler on a garbage truck and worked 12-hour days. He tried out for the Kansas City Kings in 1978.

=== Australia ===
Bruton was recruited to play in Australia for the Brisbane Bullets of the National Invitational Basketball League (now National Basketball League) by David Adkins, the director of coaching for Queensland Basketball, Inc. Adkins had seen Bruton during his tryout with the Kings and asked Shockers coach Gene Smithson to arrange a meeting. Bruton agreed and joined the Bullets in 1979. He set a single game league-record 53 points during his first season. Bruton did not return to the Bullets in 1980, instead playing for the Geelong Supercats in the Victorian league. He stayed with them when they joined the South East Australian Basketball League (SEABL) and won the SEABL championship in 1981.

The Supercats were elevated to the NBL in 1982. Three games into the season, the team's head coach was fired and Bruton was selected to take over. The Bullets lost their first game with Bruton as head coach and then won 13 games in a row to reach the finals. He was selected as the 1982 NBL Coach of the Year. During his tenure with the Supercats, Bruton was also named to the All-NBL First Team in 1983 and 1984. As coach of Geelong, Bruton led the team to the 1982 NBL Grand Final where they were defeated 80–74 by the West Adelaide Bearcats at the Broadmeadow Basketball Stadium in Newcastle. In their 15 seasons of NBL competition from 1982 to 1996, this would prove to be Geelong's only NBL Grand Final appearance.

Bruton rejoined the Bullets in 1985 and helped them to their first NBL championship with a 121–95 win over the Adelaide 36ers. This success was followed in 1986 when the naturalised Bruton represented the Australian Boomers at the 1986 FIBA World Championship in Spain. After returning from Spain Bruton helped the Bullets into their fourth straight Grand Final where they would again face the Adelaide 36ers. For 1986 the NBL had extended the Grand Final to a best-of-three series. Game 1 was played in front of a record crowd of 11,000 at the Brisbane Entertainment Centre and saw a 122–119 win for Adelaide in overtime saw them overwhelming favourites (the 36ers had gone 24–2 during the season) to go home and wrap up the championship at the Apollo Stadium where they had an imposing 14–0 record up until that point of the season (and in fact had not lost since June 1985, a streak of 20 straight home wins). Brisbane, led by Bruton with 38 points, Ron Radliff and Larry Sengstock, stunned the 36ers with a 104–83 win to force a third and deciding game just two days later. Bruton's best friend off the court also happened to be Adelaide's point guard Al Green who was also a native of New York. The two, best friends off the court but the fiercest of rivals on it, had a running battle in Game 3 with Green eventually coming out on top leading Adelaide to a 113–91 victory for the 36ers' first NBL title. Bruton led all scorers, averaging 30.0 points, plus he had 3.3 assists per game over the Grand Final series.

Following the 1986 Grand Final series, Bruton had a public falling out with Bullets coach Brian Kerle and was sacked from the club under controversial circumstances. He was immediately snapped up as playing coach of perennial easy-beats the Perth Wildcats for the 1987 NBL season and immediately set about building a championship contending team. He recruited two players who would become stars with the Wildcats, 6 ft 8 in (2.03 m) centre/power forwards James Crawford (a teammate of Bruton's at Geelong in 1982 known as the "Alabama Slamma" for his dunking ability) and former Harlem Globetrotter Kendal "Tiny" Pinder. As playing coach of the Wildcats Bruton built a team to beat the reigning NBL champions, the Adelaide 36ers. His plan paid off when the Wildcats defeated Adelaide 2–1 in the semi-finals (both wins were on Adelaide's home court where the 36ers had only lost twice during the season). Perth were unable to overcome Bruton's old team Brisbane and went down 2–0 in the Grand Final series.

Bruton played three seasons in Perth (two of which he shared playing and coaching duties), before becoming the head coach in 1990 in somewhat controversial circumstances. Alan Black was the head coach for the Wildcats at the beginning of the 1990 season, but after only two matches he was replaced by Bruton. Despite this eventful start to the season Bruton guided the Wildcats to its first NBL championship when they defeated the Brisbane Bullets (still coached by Kerle) 2–1 in the Grand Final series. Bruton himself was replaced the following year by Murray Arnold.

Cal sat out the 1991 NBL season, but returned in 1992 with another of the NBL's perennial easy-beats, the Hobart Devils. This would again later result in Bruton becoming the head coach for the Devils in their final season in 1996.

== Coaching career ==
In the 1999–2000 NBL season, Bruton once again returned to coaching, this time for the Canberra Cannons. Like with the Hobart Devils, the Cannons were in financial difficulty at the time and their future was looking bleak. The 2002–03 season saw the financial difficulties of the Cannons reaching boiling point and it was announced their license would be sold. This series of events resulted in Bruton quitting the Cannons and not following the club in their move to Newcastle as the Hunter Pirates.

During the 2006–07 NBL season, Bruton was signed as interim head coach of the West Sydney Razorbacks, taking over in the middle of the season though he wasn't retained as coach for 2007–08.

On 6 October 2026, Bruton was announced as head coach of the Goldfields Giants men's team in the NBL1 West for the 2027 and 2028 seasons.

== Honour roll ==
NBL career:	1979–1989, 1992
NBL Grand Final appearances:	4 (1982, 1985, 1986, 1987)
NBL Championships:	1 (1985)
All-NBL First Team:	2 (1983, 1984)
NBL Coach of the Year:	1 (1982)
NBL Grand Finals (coach):	3 (1982, 1987, 1990)
NBL Championships (coach):	1 (1990)
NBL 20th Anniversary Team:	1998

== NBL career stats ==
Games:	250 (69 Bri, 79 Gee, 82 Per, 20 Hob)
Points:	5,574 (19.3 pg)
Free Throws:	727 / 871 (83.5%)
Field goals:	1,864 / 4,098 (45.5%)
3 Points:	373 / 958 (38.9%)
Steals:	1.2 pg
Assists:	3.9 pg
Blocked Shots:	0.1 pg

== Personal life ==
Originally an American import, Bruton became a naturalised Australian in 1983. He renounced his American citizenship to play for the Australia men's national basketball team in 1986.

Bruton appeared in a celebrity episode of 1980s gameshow It's a Knockout where he dressed in a horse suit alongside Big Sports Breakfast co-host and journalist Terry Kennedy.

Bruton has children by three women. His son, C. J., played in the NBL.

Bruton was awarded an Order of Australia Medal (OAM) in the 2021 Australia Day Honours, for "For service to basketball as a player and coach."
