= Scott Fisher (basketball) =

American-Australian basketball player and head coach

Personal information
- Born: July 20, 1963 (age 63) San Jose, California, U.S.
- Listed height: 6 ft 7 in (2.01 m)
- Listed weight: 235 lb (107 kg)

Career information
- High school: Mission San Jose (Fremont, California)
- College: UC Santa Barbara (1982–1986)
- NBA draft: 1986: undrafted
- Playing career: 1986–2002
- Position: Power forward
- Number: 30

Career history

Playing
- 1986–1987: Cincinnati Slammers
- 1987–1992: North Melbourne Giants
- 1989–1990: San Jose Jammers
- 1993–2002: Perth Wildcats

Coaching
- 2004–2008: Perth Wildcats
- 2011–2014: University of Hawaii (assistant)
- 2014–2018: Ohlone College

Career highlights
- 3× NBL champion (1989, 1995, 2000); 2× NBL Most Valuable Player (1989, 1992); NBL Grand Final MVP (1989); 4× All-NBL First Team (1989–1992); 3× All-NBL Second Team (1987, 1988, 1993); NBL's 20th Anniversary Team; NBL's 25th Anniversary Team; No. 30 retired by Perth Wildcats; Australian Basketball Hall of Fame inductee

Scott Fisher (born July 20, 1963) is an American-Australian former professional basketball player and coach, most known for his time spent with the Perth Wildcats of the National Basketball League (NBL) in both roles. As a player, he won the NBL MVP in 1989 and 1992 while playing for the North Melbourne Giants. He won a championship with the Giants in 1989 before winning two more with the Wildcats in 1995 and 2000. He also played for the Australian national team at the 1996 Olympic Games and the 1998 FIBA World Championship.

== Playing career ==
Born in San Jose, California, Fisher played at the University of California, Santa Barbara under head coach Jerry Pimm. He combined with Conner Henry to form an effective inside-outside scoring combination, with Fisher in the low post and Henry driving to the basket or hitting spot up jump shots. Fisher possessed an excellent drop step and had a soft shooting touch inside 15 feet. He earned 2nd team All Big West honors in his junior and senior years.

Fisher began his NBL career in 1987 with the North Melbourne Giants. While playing with the Giants Fisher was awarded the NBL's MVP, the Grand Final MVP, and won his first championship in 1989. Between 1989 and 1992 Fisher would also be named in the All-NBL First Team.

In 1993, Fisher suited up for the Perth Wildcats for the first time. With the Wildcats, Fisher would participate in another two NBL championships in 1995 and 2000. Fisher represented Australia from 1995–1998 and competed in the Atlanta Olympics (fourth place) in 1996. He also represented Australia at the Goodwill Games (winning Silver) and World Championships in 1998. Fisher was named in the NBL's 20th Anniversary Team in 1998 and then again in the 25th Anniversary Team in 2003 shortly after retiring. In 2007 Fisher was inducted into the NBL Hall of Fame.

Fisher played 247 games for the Perth Wildcats and a total of 417 games in his NBL career.

== Coaching career ==
In 2004, Fisher replaced Mike Ellis as head coach of the Wildcats.

In March 2008, Fisher decided to leave the Perth Wildcats, after they were beaten in the best of three NBL Semi Finals series by the Sydney Kings.

In June 2010, Fisher was appointed director of basketball operations for the University of Hawaii. In June 2011, Fisher was elevated to assistant coach at the University of Hawaii.

In May 2014, Fisher was appointed head coach at Ohlone College in Fremont, California.

== 2013 ==
On February 4, 2013, Fisher was named to the Perth Wildcats 30th Anniversary All-Star team.

== Personal life ==
In July 2016, Fisher married Dina Eastwood, ex-wife of Clint Eastwood.
