= James Crawford (basketball) =

American former professional basketball player

Personal information
- Born: April 13, 1960 (age 65) Lower Peach Tree, Alabama, U.S.
- Listed height: 6 ft 8 in (2.03 m)
- Listed weight: 214 lb (97 kg)

Career information
- High school: Pine Hill (Pine Hill, Alabama)
- College: West Alabama (1977–1979); Cumberlands (1979–1981)
- NBA draft: 1981: undrafted
- Playing career: 1982–2003
- Position: Power forward / Centre

Career history
- 1982–1985: Geelong Supercats
- 1986: Canberra Cannons
- 1987–1999: Perth Wildcats
- 2003: Canberra Cannons

Career highlights
- 3× NBL champion (1990, 1991, 1995); 10× NBL All-Star (1988–1997); 4× All-NBL First Team (1982–1984, 1987); All-NBL Third Team (1994); NBL's 20th Anniversary Team; NBL's 25th Anniversary Team; No. 7 retired by Perth Wildcats; Australian Basketball Hall of Fame inductee (2013)

James Crawford (born April 13, 1960) is an American former professional basketball player who played in the Australian National Basketball League from 1982 to 2003. He was well known for his thunderous two handed dunks.

== School ==
Crawford was born in Lower Peach Tree, Alabama, and attended Pine Hill High School in Pine Hill, Alabama. Prior to coming to Australia in 1981, Crawford attended Livingston University and Cumberland College in Kentucky.

== Professional career ==
Crawford debuted in the NBL in 1982 with the Geelong Supercats. After four seasons with Geelong, he played a season with the Canberra Cannons in 1986 and then joined the Perth Wildcats in 1987. He played 13 seasons for the Wildcats, with his final season coming in 1998–99. Despite retiring due to injury in 1999, Crawford suited up in one more NBL match for the Canberra Cannons in the 2002–03 NBL season.

With the Wildcats in 1987, Crawford had two 50-point games. On September 6, 1987, he set the Wildcats' scoring record of 57 points in a 34-point win over the Melbourne Tigers. He played all 48 minutes and hit 24 of 36 shots from the field. His record stood until December 1, 2024, when Bryce Cotton had a 59-point game. Crawford was an integral part of the Wildcats' three NBL championships in 1990, 1991 and 1995, and he was also selected to the NBL's All-First Team four times (1982, 1983, 1984 and 1987).

Crawford played in a total of 504 NBL games, 371 of them for the Wildcats. He finished with 11,121 points, scoring at an average of 22.1 per game. He also had 4,794 career rebounds (9.5 per game) and 788 career blocks (1.5 per game). He was selected to the NBL's 20th Anniversary Team in 1998 and the NBL's 25th Anniversary Team in 2004.

In 2013, Crawford was named in the Perth Wildcats 30th Anniversary All-Star team and was inducted into the Australian Basketball Hall of Fame.

As of 2024, Crawford (#7) is one of eight players to have their jersey number retired by the Perth Wildcats.

== Coaching career ==
Crawford served as head coach of the Perth Breakers during the 2000–01 WNBL season.

== Honour roll ==
NBL career:	1982–1999, 2003
Perth Wildcats MVP:	4 (1987, 1988, 1990, 1992)
NBL Grand Final appearances:	6 (1982, 1987, 1990, 1991, 1993, 1995)
NBL Championships:	3 (1990, 1991, 1995)
All-NBL First Team:	4 (1982, 1983, 1984, 1987)
NBL 20th Anniversary Team:	1998
NBL 25th Anniversary Team:	2003

== NBL career stats ==
Games:	504 (105 Gee, 28 Can, 371 Per)
Points:	11,121 (22.1 pg)
Field goals:	4,572 / 8,361 (54.7%)
3-Pointers:	18 / 83 (21.7%)
Free Throws:	1,959 / 2,856 (68.6%)
Rebounds:	4,794 (9.5 pg)
Assists:	1.8 pg
Steals:	1.1 pg
Blocked Shots:	788 (1.6 pg)
