= Mike Ellis (basketball) =

Australian basketball player (born 1958)

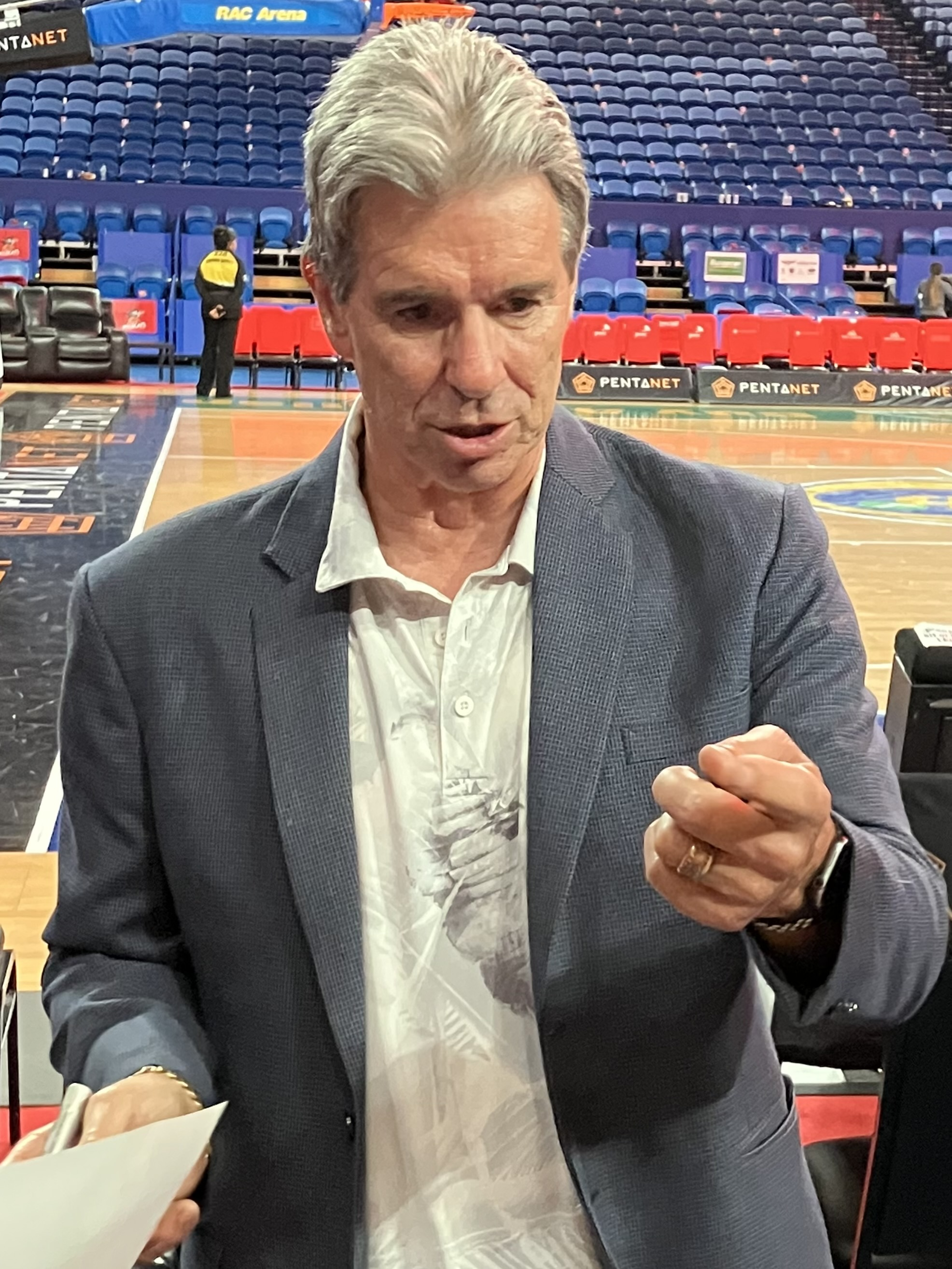
- Ellis in 2023

Personal information
- Born: 27 July 1958 (age 68) Perth, Western Australia, Australia
- Listed height: 183 cm (6 ft 0 in)
- Listed weight: 85 kg (187 lb)

Career information
- Playing career: 1982–1997
- Position: Point guard
- Number: 6
- Coaching career: 1998–present

Career history

Playing
- 1982–1992: Perth Wildcats
- 1993–1994: Swan City Mustangs
- 1995–1997: Stirling Senators

Coaching
- 1998–2003: Perth Wildcats (assistant)
- 1999–2001: Stirling Senators
- 2003–2004: Perth Wildcats
- 2016–2021: Stirling/Warwick Senators

Career highlights
- As player: 2× NBL champion (1990, 1991); No. 6 retired by Perth Wildcats; As coach: WCC champion (2020); NBL champion (2000); SBL Coach of the Year (2000)

Mike Ellis (born 27 July 1958) is an Australian former basketball player who captained the Perth Wildcats of the National Basketball League (NBL) for the club's first 11 seasons, and helped guide them to two championships in 1990 and 1991. Ellis' No. 6 jersey was retired by both the Wildcats and his junior association, the Warwick Senators.

== Career ==
=== Perth Wildcats ===
Ellis played his entire NBL career with the Perth Wildcats, beginning with the club in their inaugural season in 1982 and captained the side every year until his final season in 1992. He helped the team win championships in 1990 and 1991. In 302 career games, Ellis averaged 12.6 points, 2.2 rebounds, 5.3 assists and 1.6 steals per game.

Between 1998 and 2003, Ellis served as an assistant coach with the Wildcats. He was elevated to head coach for the 2003–04 season, but was sacked after one season.

Ellis was named in the Wildcats' 30th Anniversary All-Star team.

=== Stirling/Warwick Senators ===
Ellis began playing for the Stirling Basketball Association in 1974 in the pre State Basketball League (SBL) competition and was a member of the club's first premiership team the following year. In the early 1980s, Ellis averaged over 30 points per game for five consecutive seasons for the Senators. After a two-year stint with the Swan City Mustangs (1993–94), Ellis played a further three seasons with the Senators between 1995 and 1997.

Following his retirement, Ellis served as head coach of the Senators men's team between 1999 and 2001, earning SBL Coach of the Year honours in 2000.

Ellis returned to coach the Senators men's team between 2016 and 2021, winning the West Coast Classic in 2020.

In August 2021, Ellis was inducted into the Basketball WA Hall of Fame.

== Personal life ==
Ellis' father, Gordon, coached him at the Perth Wildcats in 1983. Gordon died four years later. Two of Ellis' brothers, Glenn and Brett, also played for the Perth Wildcats. Both of them also played in the SBL for the Swan City Mustangs and Stirling Senators. Ellis also has a third brother, Stephen, and has a wife named Robyn. Ellis and his wife have two sons, Cody and Skyler.
