= National Basketball League (Australia) Boxing Day games =

Games held by the National Basketball League (NBL) on Boxing Day, 26 December, have been an annual tradition since the league's 21st season in 1998.

== Results ==
Year	Winner	Score	Runner-up	Arena
1998–99	Sydney Kings	107–102	Newcastle Falcons	Sydney Entertainment Centre
1998–99	Adelaide 36ers	93–91	Victoria Titans	Rod Laver Arena
1999–00	Canberra Cannons	121–94	West Sydney Razorbacks	AIS Arena
1999–00	Adelaide 36ers	103–77	Victoria Titans	Rod Laver Arena
2000–01	Victoria Titans	100–82	Sydney Kings	Vodafone Arena
2001–02	N/A	N/A	N/A	N/A
2002–03	N/A	N/A	N/A	N/A
2003–04	N/A	N/A	N/A	N/A
2004–05	Wollongong Hawks	95–88	Hunter Pirates	Newcastle Entertainment Centre
2004–05	Melbourne Tigers	103–88	New Zealand Breakers	State Netball and Hockey Centre
2004–05	West Sydney Razorbacks	93–76	Sydney Kings	Sydney Super Dome
2004–05	Perth Wildcats	111–102	Townsville Crocodiles	Townsville Entertainment Centre
2005–06	N/A	N/A	N/A	N/A
2006–07	N/A	N/A	N/A	N/A
2007–08	Adelaide 36ers	119–114	South Dragons	Vodafone Arena
2008–09	South Dragons	117–87	Gold Coast Blaze	Hisense Arena
2009–10	Melbourne Tigers	90–88	Wollongong Hawks	State Netball and Hockey Centre
2010–11	N/A	N/A	N/A	N/A
2011–12	N/A	N/A	N/A	N/A
2012–13	N/A	N/A	N/A	N/A
2013–14	N/A	N/A	N/A	N/A
2014–15	Sydney Kings	85–97	New Zealand Breakers	Qantas Credit Union Arena
2015–16	N/A	N/A	N/A	N/A
2016–17	Melbourne United	97–59	Brisbane Bullets	Hisense Arena
2017–18	Melbourne United	69–68	Brisbane Bullets	Hisense Arena
2018–19	Melbourne United	101–103	Adelaide 36ers	Melbourne Arena
2019–20	Melbourne United	75–77	Cairns Taipans	Melbourne Arena
2020–21	N/A	N/A	N/A	N/A
2021–22	Tasmania JackJumpers	84–75	New Zealand Breakers	MyState Bank Arena
2021–22	Melbourne United	82–68	Sydney Kings	Qudos Bank Arena
2022–23	Tasmania JackJumpers	0–0	New Zealand Breakers	MyState Bank Arena

== Boxing Day standings ==
Team	Last Game	Wins	Losses	Defunct
Adelaide 36ers	2018–19	3	0	
Brisbane Bullets	2017–18	0	3	
Cairns Taipans	2019–20	1	0	
Canberra Cannons	1999–00	0	1	Now Defunct
Gold Coast Blaze	2008–09	0	1	Now Defunct
Hunter Pirates	2004–05	0	1	New Defunct
Melbourne United	2021–22	5	2	
New Zealand Breakers	2021–22	1	2	
Perth Wildcats	2004–05	1	0	
South Dragons	2008–09	1	0	Now Defunct
Sydney Kings	2021–22	1	4	
Townsville Crocodiles	2004–05	0	1	Now Defunct
Victoria Titans	2000–01	1	2	Now Defunct
West Sydney Razorbacks	2004–05	1	1	Now Defunct
Illawarra Hawks	2009–10	1	1	
Tasmania JackJumpers	2021–22	1	0	

== See also ==
- National Basketball League (Australia)
