= NBL Best Sixth Man Award =

Annual National Basketball League award

The National Basketball League Best Sixth Man is an annual National Basketball League (NBL) award given since the 1996 NBL season to the best performing reserve player of the regular season. As of the 2023–24 season, the head coach, assistant coach and captain of each team vote for the Sixth Man of the Year. Voters are not allowed to vote for players from their own team.

== Winners ==
Year	Player	Nationality	Team
1996	Mike McKay	Australia	Brisbane Bullets
1997	Ben Pepper	Australia	Newcastle Falcons
1998	Jason Smith	Australia	South East Melbourne Magic
1998–99	Bruce Bolden	United States	West Sydney Razorbacks
1999–2000	Ben Knight	Australia	Townsville Crocodiles
2000–01	Chris Anstey	Australia	Victoria Titans
2001–02	Jamahl Mosley	United States	Victoria Titans
2002–03	Stephen Black	Australia	Perth Wildcats
2003–04	Darryl McDonald	Australia	Melbourne Tigers
2004–05	Brad Newley	Australia	Townsville Crocodiles
2005–06	Stephen Hoare	Australia	Melbourne Tigers
2006–07	Stephen Hoare (2)	Australia	Melbourne Tigers
2007–08	Dontaye Draper	United States	Sydney Kings
2008–09	Phill Jones	New Zealand	New Zealand Breakers
2009–10	Erron Maxey	United States	Gold Coast Blaze
2010–11	Kevin Braswell	United States	New Zealand Breakers
2011–12	Jesse Wagstaff	Australia	Perth Wildcats
2012–13	Adris De León	Dominican Republic	Wollongong Hawks
2013–14	Kevin Tiggs	United States	Wollongong Hawks
2014–15	Cameron Tragardh	Australia	Cairns Taipans
2015–16	Hakim Warrick	United States	Melbourne United
2016–17	Rotnei Clarke	United States	Illawarra Hawks
2017–18	Ramone Moore	United States	Adelaide 36ers
2018–19	Reuben Te Rangi	New Zealand	Brisbane Bullets
2019–20	Jason Cadee	Australia	Brisbane Bullets
2020–21	Jo Lual-Acuil	South Sudan	Melbourne United
2021–22	Shea Ili	New Zealand	Melbourne United
2022–23	Barry Brown Jr.	United States	New Zealand Breakers
2023–24	Ian Clark	United States	Melbourne United
2024–25	Kouat Noi	South Sudan	Sydney Kings
2025–26	Angus Glover	Australia	South East Melbourne Phoenix
