= Tony Ronaldson =

Australian basketball player

Personal information
- Born: 25 May 1972 (age 54) Adelaide, South Australia, Australia
- Listed height: 203 cm (6 ft 8 in)
- Listed weight: 105 kg (231 lb)

Career information
- College: Arizona State (1991–1992)
- NBA draft: 1993: undrafted
- Playing career: 1989–2010
- Position: Power forward

Career history
- 1989: Australian Institute of Sport
- 1990–1991: Eastside Spectres
- 1990: Nunawading Spectres
- 1992–1998: South East Melbourne Magic
- 1998–2002: Victoria Titans
- 2002–2007: Perth Wildcats
- 2005–2006: Stirling Senators
- 2007–2010: New Zealand Breakers
- 2010: Waikato Pistons

Career highlights
- 2× NBL champion (1992, 1996); 2× All-NBL Second Team (1994, 1996); 2× All-NBL Third Team (1998, 2002)
Medals
Men's basketball
Representing Australia
| Gold medal – first place | 2006 Melbourne | Team competition |

Anthony Dean Ronaldson (born 25 May 1972) is an Australian former professional basketball player who played the majority of his career in the Australian National Basketball League (NBL). Known as "The Bear", Ronaldson played for the Eastside Spectres, South East Melbourne Magic, Victoria Titans, Perth Wildcats and New Zealand Breakers in the NBL. He played in seven NBL Grand Final series and won two championships, both with the Magic in 1992 and 1996. He also represented Australia at the 1996 Olympic Games in Atlanta and again in 2004 in Athens

== Early life ==
Ronaldson was born in Adelaide, South Australia, but grew up playing for Nunawading in Melbourne.

== Playing career ==
In 1989, Ronaldson attended the Australian Institute of Sport (AIS) and played for the AIS men's team in the South East Australian Basketball League (SEABL). Ronaldson made his NBL debut in 1990 with the Eastside Spectres under the coaching of Brian Goorjian, playing two seasons there. In July 1990, he also had a one-game stint with the Nunawading Spectres SEABL team. He missed the Eastside Spectres' Grand Final appearance in 1991 due to leaving for the United States to attend Arizona State University.

When the Spectres merged with the Southern Melbourne Saints in 1992, Ronaldson was one of the players to be signed to the newly created South East Melbourne Magic who played out of the NBL's then largest venue, the 15,300 capacity National Tennis Centre. During his time with the Magic, Ronaldson competed in four Grand Finals, winning two NBL championships in 1992 and 1996 (both times defeating cross-town rivals the Melbourne Tigers who also used the Tennis Centre as their home venue) and being runner up in 1997 to the Tigers and 1998 to the Adelaide 36ers.

When the Magic also merged with another club in 1998–99, this time with cross-town rivals the North Melbourne Giants, Ronaldson once again signed with the resulting team: the Victoria Titans. With the Titans, he played in back-to-back losing Grand Finals.

Ronaldson eventually left the Titans at the end of the 2001–02 NBL season, signing with the Perth Wildcats for 2002–03 season and helping them reach the Grand Final, where they lost 2–0 to the Sydney Kings. Following the retirement of Ricky Grace, Ronaldson captained the club in 2005–06, but was replaced by Paul Rogers the following season. In October 2006, Ronaldson played his 550th NBL game. In 2005 and 2006, he played in the State Basketball League for the Stirling Senators.

Ronaldson left the Wildcats after the 2006–07 season and signed with the New Zealand Breakers. Ronaldson ended his NBL career following the 2009–10 season, finishing with 665 games and averages of 15.3 points, 5.2 rebounds and 2.7 assists per game. Ronaldson has more wins than anyone else in NBL history with 430 victories from his 665-game career at a success rate of 64.66%.

=== NBL records ===
Ronaldson's 665 games leads the NBL for most games played all-time. He is also the fifth-highest scorer in the NBL with 10,154 points, and also holds the sixth-highest record for defensive rebounds with 2,642. He has also made the most appearances in the NBL Finals, playing in a league record 20 consecutive Finals series from 1990 to 2009. The only time in his NBL career that his team did not make the playoffs was his final season in 2009–10 when the Breakers finished one game short in 5th place (2009–10 was the first time the NBL used their current 4 team finals format).

== National team career ==
In addition to his NBL career, Ronaldson represented Australia at international level on numerous occasions, making his debut for the Boomers at the 1994 FIBA World Championship in Toronto, Canada. He was also a member of the Boomers for the 1996 Olympic Games (in which he made a spectacular four-point play in the dying seconds against Croatia to give the Boomers a 73–71 win and a berth in the bronze medal game against Lithuania where they lost 80–74), the 1998 FIBA World Championship in Greece, the 2004 Olympic Games and the 2006 Commonwealth Games in Melbourne where he won a gold medal with the Boomers after they easily defeated their Trans-Tasman rivals New Zealand 77–39 in the Final.

== Honour roll ==
| NBL career: | 1990–2010 (21 seasons - 1st All-time) |
| NBL Grand Final appearances: | 7 (1991, 1992, 1996, 1997, 1998/99, 1999/00, 2002/03 - 2nd All-time) |
| NBL Championships: | 2 (1992, 1996) |
| NBL Finals appearances: | 20 (1990–2009 - 1st All-time) |

== NBL career stats ==
| Games: | 665 (46 Eas, 194 SEM, 102 Vic, 170 Per, 79 NZB - 1st All-time) |
| Rebounds: | 5.2 pg |
| Points: | 10,154 (15.3 pg) |
| Free Throws: | 1,512 / 2,146 (70.5%) |
| Field goals: | 3,738 / 8,903 (42.0%) |
| 3 Points: | 1,166 / 3,371 (34.6%) |
| Steals: | 0.6 pg |
| Assists: | 2.7 pg |
| Blocks: | 0.3 pg |

Awards
| Preceded by Ricky Grace | Captain of the Perth Wildcats; 2005/06 | Succeeded by Paul Rogers |
