= Goorjian =

Goorjian is a surname. Notable people with the surname include:

- Brian Goorjian (born 1953), American basketball coach and player
- Ed Goorjian (1926–2022), American basketball coach
- Michael A. Goorjian (born 1971), American actor, filmmaker, and writer
