= Chris Anstey =

Australian basketball player (born 1975)

Personal information
- Born: 1 January 1975 (age 51) Melbourne, Victoria, Australia
- Listed height: 7 ft 0 in (2.13 m)
- Listed weight: 245 lb (111 kg)

Career information
- NBA draft: 1997: 1st round, 18th overall pick
- Drafted by: Portland Trail Blazers
- Playing career: 1994–2010
- Position: Center
- Number: 11, 13, 22
- Coaching career: 2012–2014

Career history

Playing
- 1994: Melbourne Tigers
- 1995–1997: South East Melbourne Magic
- 1997–1999: Dallas Mavericks
- 1999–2000: Chicago Bulls
- 2000–2002: Victoria Titans
- 2002–2003: Ural Great
- 2003–2005: UNICS Kazan
- 2005–2010: Melbourne Tigers

Coaching
- 2012–2014: Melbourne Tigers/United

Career highlights
- 3x NBL champion (1996, 2006, 2008); 2x NBL MVP (2006, 2008); 2x NBL Grand Final MVP (2006, 2008); 5x All-NBL First Team (2002, 2006-2009); All-NBL Second Team (2001); NBL Best Defensive Player (2008); 2x NBL Leading Rebounder (2008, 2009); 4x NBL Leading Shot Blocker (2006-2009); NBL's Most Improved Player (1996); NBL Best Sixth Man (2001); Gaze Medal winner (2002); FIBA 22 & Under World Championships MVP (1997)
- Stats at NBA.com
- Stats at Basketball Reference

Christopher John Anstey (born 1 January 1975) is an Australian former professional basketball player. His career included stints in the National Basketball Association (NBA), Russia and Spain. Anstey was selected by the Portland Trail Blazers in the first round (18th pick overall) of the 1997 NBA draft. He also played for the Melbourne Tigers, South East Melbourne Magic and Victoria Titans in the NBL. He retired at the end of the 2009–10 season while with the Tigers and later became the team's head coach in 2012.

== Professional career ==
=== Early NBL years ===
Anstey took up basketball at the relatively late age of 17. Before that he was a promising tennis player, peaking at rank number 2 amongst Australia's 15-year-old players and regularly playing doubles with Mark Philippoussis. In 1994, he joined the Melbourne Tigers and was teammates with some of the most recognisable names in Australian basketball, such as Andrew Gaze, Mark Bradtke, and Lanard Copeland, as well as head coach Lindsay Gaze. After one season with the Tigers, Anstey was signed by South East Melbourne Magic coach Brian Goorjian. He played for the Magic from 1995 to 1997, earning the NBL Most Improved Player Award in 1996 as well as the 1996 NBL Championship, before going to the NBA.

=== NBA ===
Anstey was the 18th overall selection of the 1997 NBA draft by the Portland Trail Blazers. His draft rights were traded by the Blazers with cash to the Dallas Mavericks for the draft rights to Kelvin Cato in June 1997. At his introductory press conference, then-GM, Don Nelson, said Anstey could become “the best running big man in the NBA” based on his tennis background. In Anstey’s rookie year, 1997–98, he averaged 5.9 PPG and 3.8 RPG in 16.6 MPG. He scored a career-high 26 points against the Boston Celtics on 17 March. The next year, his numbers dropped to 3.3 PPG and 2.4 RPG. He was traded by the Mavericks to the Chicago Bulls for a second-round draft pick in 2000 in September 1999. He averaged 6.0 PPG and 3.8 RPG on 44.2 FG% in his last NBA season with the Bulls. Anstey owns career NBA averages of 5.2 PPG, 3.4 RPG and 0.4 BPG in 155 games with 23 starts.

=== Europe and return to NBL ===
Anstey returned to the NBL with the Victoria Titans in 2000–01, winning Best Sixth Man. In 2003, Anstey led Russian club Ural Great Perm to runners up in the Russian Championship, and was named ULEB Cup MVP. In 2004, Anstey signed with UNICS Kazan, and had an All-Star season, leading the team to a EuroChallenge Championship, the first in Russian history. Anstey was a Euroleague All-Star again in 2005. Anstey returned to his native Australia with his original team, the Melbourne Tigers, in 2006. After returning, Anstey enjoyed plenty of success, leading the NBL in blocks in 2006, 2007, 2008 and 2009; and in rebounding in 2008 and 2009; earning the MVP in 2006 and 2008; Grand Finals MVP in 2006 and Best Defensive Player in 2008.

Chris Anstey retired from playing at the conclusion of the 2009–10 NBL season. In his final NBL game against the Gold Coast Blaze at the State Netball and Hockey Centre in Melbourne, Anstey scored 13 points, had 6 rebounds, 2 assists and 1 block though the Blaze defeated the Tigers 91–73.

=== Olympics and World championships ===
Anstey was a member of the Australian boomers, competing in the 2000 Sydney Olympics and the 2008 Beijing Olympics, though unfortunately he missed the 2004 Athens Olympics due to injury. He was also a member of the Boomers at the 1998 FIBA World Championship in Athens.

Anstey won Gold with the Australian Emus at the 1997 22 & Under World Championships played in his home town of Melbourne where was named as tournament MVP.

=== Coaching ===
Anstey was appointed head coach of Caulfield Grammar School's first boys' team in 2010 and still holds that position today. His team won 3 APS titles, 2 McDonald's Cups and 1 National Championship.

Anstey coached the Camberwell Dragons senior Men at Big V level in 2011 and 2012, guiding them to consecutive semi-finals appearances, representing the most successful period of time in club history.

Anstey was appointed head coach of the Melbourne Tigers for the 2012–13 NBL season. He was subsequently re-signed as the head coach for 2013–14 for his efforts during 2012–13. On 13 October 2014, he stepped down as head of Melbourne following United's 2014–15 season opening loss to Cairns.

=== Career highlights ===
- 1994 – Melbourne Tigers.
  - NBL Semi-finals.
- 1995 – 97 South East Melbourne Magic.
  - NBL Semi-finals (1995).
  - NBL Championship, Most Improved Player. (1996).
  - NBL Championship runners up (1997).
- 1997
  - Australian National (22&U) team.
    - Won world championships.
    - Named tournament MVP.
  - Selected 18th in the NBA draft.
- 1998
  - Dallas Mavericks
  - Represented Australia at the Goodwill Games.
- 1999
  - Traded to Chicago Bulls in the NBA's offseason.
- 2000
  - Boomers
    - Won Hong Kong Diamond Ball Classic.
    - 4th in the Sydney Olympics.
- 2001
  - Victoria Titans
- 2002
  - NBL All Star Five
  - Australian International Player of the Year
- 2003
  - Ural Great Perm
    - Runner-up to Russian Championship.
    - Russian Championship All Star Five.
    - Russian Championship All Import Team.
    - Russian Championship Best Centre.
- 2004
  - UNICS Kazan
    - FIBA EuropeLeague Champions.
    - FIBA EuropeLeague All Star.
    - Russian Championship Runner-up.
- 2005
  - UNICS Kazan.
    - FIBA EuropeLeague All Star
- 2006
  - Melbourne Tigers
    - NBL Pre-season MVP
    - NBL Regular Season MVP
    - NBL Champions
    - NBL Grand Final Series MVP
- 2008
  - Melbourne Tigers
    - NBL Regular Season MVP
    - NBL Champions
    - NBL Grand Final Series MVP
    - NBL Best Defensive Player
    - 1st place NBL rankings for defensive and total rebounds, and blocks

On 13 September 2000, Anstey was awarded the Australian Sports Medal.

== Corporate ==
In 2010, Anstey founded the TLC Group, which comprises TLC Mentoring, TLC Management and TLC Events.

As of September 2023, Anstey partnered with Media8 Sports, a sports media company based on the Gold Coast. The company acquired the Taranaki Airs of the New Zealand NBL, with Anstey becoming the leader of the team's basketball programme.

== Personal life ==
Anstey has three children, Isobel ("Izzy"), Ethan and Hunter. Isobel has been selected for the Australian women's under-17 and under-19 teams, and, since 2021, has played for the UCLA Bruins women's basketball team.

== Career statistics ==
=== Player ===
==== NBA ====
Legend
GP	Games played	GS	Games started	MPG	Minutes per game
FG%	Field goal percentage	3P%	3-point field goal percentage	FT%	Free throw percentage
RPG	Rebounds per game	APG	Assists per game	SPG	Steals per game
BPG	Blocks per game	PPG	Points per game	**Bold**	Career high

Year	Team	GP	GS	MPG	FG%	3P%	FT%	RPG	APG	SPG	BPG	PPG
1997–98	Dallas	41	8	**16.6**	.398	**.188**	.716	**3.8**	**0.9**	**0.8**	**0.7**	5.9
1998–99	Dallas	41	4	11.5	.360	.000	.708	2.4	0.7	0.4	0.3	3.3
1999–2000	Chicago	**73**	**11**	13.8	**.442**	.167	**.789**	**3.8**	**0.9**	0.4	0.3	**6.0**
**Career**		155	23	13.9	.413	.138	.789	3.4	0.8	0.5	0.4	5.2

==== NBL ====
Legend
GP	Games played	GS	Games started	MPG	Minutes per game
FG%	Field goal percentage	3P%	3-point field goal percentage	FT%	Free throw percentage
RPG	Rebounds per game	APG	Assists per game	SPG	Steals per game
BPG	Blocks per game	PPG	Points per game	**Bold**	Career high

†	Denotes season(s) in which Anstey won an NBL championship

Year	Team	GP	GS	MPG	FG%	3P%	FT%	RPG	APG	SPG	BPG	PPG
1994	Melbourne Tigers	20	NA	6.7	.490	.000	.737	2.6	0.4	0.2	0.2	3.1
1995	South East Melbourne Magic	26	NA	9.6	.493	.000	.607	3.3	0.3	0.2	0.3	3.3
1996†	South East Melbourne Magic	32	NA	21.9	**.607**	.000	.730	7.8	0.6	1.2	1.5	11.8
1997	South East Melbourne Magic	33	33	30.5	.479	.154	.675	9.8	0.8	**1.6**	1.8	13.8
2000–01	Victoria Titans	28	28	26.1	.499	.240	.718	9.4	0.9	0.8	2.0	16.4
2001–02	Victoria Titans	34	34	31.3	.480	.160	.751	10.5	1.3	1.4	1.3	16.8
2005–06†	Melbourne Tigers	37	37	**39.2**	.455	**.359**	.741	10.0	**3.8**	1.1	**2.1**	**22.5**
2006–07	Melbourne Tigers	**38**	**38**	34.8	.438	.229	**.808**	9.3	2.8	1.2	1.8	19.4
2007–08†	Melbourne Tigers	37	37	35.6	.480	.311	.771	**11.6**	2.6	1.5	2.0	21.8
2008–09	Melbourne Tigers	35	35	35.8	.433	.250	.743	10.5	2.1	**1.6**	1.6	18.6
2009–10	Melbourne Tigers	16	NA	23.5	.352	.268	.761	9.8	1.9	0.8	0.7	9.8
**Career**		336	NA	28.4	.468	.303	.744	8.8	1.7	1.1	1.5	15.5

=== Coach ===
==== NBL ====
Legend
Regular season	G	Games coached	W	Games won	L	Games lost	W–L %	Win–loss %
Playoffs	PG	Playoff games	PW	Playoff wins	PL	Playoff losses	PW–L %	Playoff win–loss %

Team	Year	G	W	L	W–L%	Finish	PG	PW	PL	PW–L%	Result
Melbourne Tigers	2012–13	28	12	16	.429	5th	—	—	—	—	Missed playoffs
Melbourne Tigers	2013–14	28	15	13	.536	3rd	3	1	2	.333	Semi-finalists
Melbourne United	2014–15	1	0	1	.000						
**Career**		57	27	30	.574		3	1	2	.333	
