= Jamahl Mosley =

American basketball player & coach (born 1978)

New Orleans Pelicans
- Title: Head coach
- League: NBA

Personal information
- Born: October 6, 1978 (age 48) Milwaukee, Wisconsin, U.S.
- Listed height: 6 ft 8 in (2.03 m)
- Listed weight: 225 lb (102 kg)

Career information
- High school: Rancho Buena Vista (Vista, California)
- College: Colorado (1997–2001)
- NBA draft: 2001: undrafted
- Playing career: 2001–2005
- Position: Forward
- Coaching career: 2005–present

Career history

Playing
- 2001: Petroleros de Salamanca
- 2001–2003: Victoria Titans / Giants
- 2003–2004: Baloncesto León
- 2004: Korihait
- 2005: Seoul Samsung Thunders

Coaching
- 2005–2007: Denver Nuggets (player development)
- 2007–2010: Denver Nuggets (assistant)
- 2010–2014: Cleveland Cavaliers (assistant)
- 2014–2021: Dallas Mavericks (assistant)
- 2021–2026: Orlando Magic
- 2026–present: New Orleans Pelicans

Career highlights
- As player: NBL Best Sixth Man (2002); Third-team All-Big 12 (2000)

Jamahl Malcolm Mosley (born October 6, 1978) is an American professional basketball coach and former player who is the head coach of the New Orleans Pelicans of the National Basketball Association (NBA). He played college basketball for the Colorado Buffaloes and professionally for four seasons overseas.

Mosley began his coaching career in 2005 as a player development coach for the Denver Nuggets. He was promoted to assistant coach in 2007 and served in the same capacity for the Cleveland Cavaliers and Dallas Mavericks. After seven years with the Mavericks, Mosley was hired as head coach for the Orlando Magic in 2021.

== Early life ==
Mosley was born on October 6, 1978, in Milwaukee as the second child to parents James and Deborah Mosley. His parents divorced when he was 6 and he moved to San Diego with his mother and brother when he was 13. Mosley attended Rancho Buena Vista High School, where he was named the California Interscholastic Federation Player of the Year in 1997.

== Playing career ==
Mosley played college basketball for the Colorado Buffaloes and was a third-team All-Big 12 selection in 2000. He began his career in Mexico with Petroleros de Salamanca in 2001 before he joined the Victoria Titans of the Australian National Basketball League (NBL) and was named the league's Best Sixth Man in 2002. Mosley signed with Baloncesto León in 2003 and played there for one season. He split the 2004–05 season with Korihait in Finland and the Seoul Samsung Thunders in South Korea where he finished his playing career.

== Coaching career ==
Mosley joined the Denver Nuggets of the NBA as a player development coach and scout in 2005. He was promoted to an assistant coach in 2007. Mosley worked as an assistant coach for the Cleveland Cavaliers from 2010 to 2014. He joined the Dallas Mavericks as an assistant coach in 2014. Mosley became the Mavericks' defensive coordinator in 2018. On April 2, 2021, he served as acting head coach after Rick Carlisle had a positive COVID-19 test and led the Mavericks to a 99–86 victory over the New York Knicks.

=== Orlando Magic (2021–2026) ===
On July 11, 2021, Mosley was named as head coach of the Orlando Magic. In his introductory press conference, Mosley said he wanted a pass-oriented offense that "play[s] with pace", and a "disruptive" defense with strong communication between the players.

On March 12, 2024, Mosley agreed to a four-year extension with the Magic. After the Magic blew a 3–1 series lead against the Detroit Pistons in the first round of the 2026 NBA playoffs, Mosley was fired on May 4, 2026.

=== New Orleans Pelicans (2026–present) ===
On May 18, 2026, after being fired by the Magic, the New Orleans Pelicans hired Mosley as head coach to replace interim head coach James Borrego.

== Head coaching record ==
Legend
Regular season	G	Games coached	W	Games won	L	Games lost	W–L %	Win–loss %
Playoffs	PG	Playoff games	PW	Playoff wins	PL	Playoff losses	PW–L %	Playoff win–loss %

Team	Year	G	W	L	W–L%	Finish	PG	PW	PL	PW–L%	Result
Orlando	2021–22	82	22	60	.268	5th in Southeast	—	—	—	—	Missed playoffs
Orlando	2022–23	82	34	48	.415	4th in Southeast	—	—	—	—	Missed playoffs
Orlando	2023–24	82	47	35	.573	1st in Southeast	7	3	4	.429	Lost in first round
Orlando	2024–25	82	41	41	.500	1st in Southeast	5	1	4	.200	Lost in first round
Orlando	2025–26	82	45	37	.549	2nd in Southeast	7	3	4	.429	Lost in first round
Career		410	189	221	.461		19	7	12	.368	

== Personal life ==
Mosley is married and has three children.
