= Australian International Player of the Year =

Australian basketball award

The Australian International Player of the Year (or Gaze Medal) is an award for the best player of the Australia men's national basketball team, given annually between 1988 and 2012 and then in World Cup and Olympic years from 2014 onwards. The voting for the award is done by the players after each international match and is named after father-son duo Lindsay Gaze and Andrew Gaze.

- 1988 Phil Smyth
- 1989 Luc Longley
- 1990 Andrew Gaze
- 1991 Andrew Vlahov
- 1992 Mark Bradtke
- 1993 Andrew Vlahov
- 1994 Andrew Gaze
- 1995 Andrew Gaze
- 1996 Andrew Gaze
- 1997 Shane Heal
- 1998 Andrew Gaze
- 1999 Mark Bradtke
- 2000 Andrew Gaze
- 2001 Brett Maher
- 2002 Chris Anstey
- 2003 Matthew Nielsen
- 2004 Shane Heal
- 2005 C. J. Bruton
- 2006 Sam Mackinnon
- 2007 Sam Mackinnon
- 2008 Patty Mills
- 2009 Joe Ingles
- 2010 Patty Mills
- 2011 Brad Newley
- 2012 Joe Ingles
- 2014 Matthew Dellavedova
- 2016 Andrew Bogut
- 2019 Nick Kay and Nathan Sobey
- 2021 Patty Mills
- 2023 Josh Giddey
