= Brian Goorjian =

American-Australian basketball coach and player

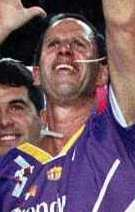
- Goorjian as head coach of the Sydney Kings in 2005

Sydney Kings
- Title: Head coach
- League: NBL

Personal information
- Born: 28 June 1953 (age 73) Glendale, California
- Listed height: 6 ft 3 in (1.91 m)

Career information
- High school: Crescenta Valley (La Crescenta, California)
- College: Pepperdine (1973–1976)
- NBA draft: 1976: undrafted
- Playing career: 1977–1985
- Position: Guard
- Coaching career: 1986–present

Career history

Playing
- 1977–1985: Melbourne Tigers

Coaching
- 1986–1987: Ballarat Miners
- 1988–1991: Eastside Spectres
- 1992–1998: South East Melbourne Magic
- 1998–2002: Victoria Titans
- 2002–2008: Sydney Kings
- 2008–2009: South Dragons
- 2009–2015: Dongguan Leopards
- 2015–2016: Guangdong Southern Tigers (assistant)
- 2016–2018: Shanghai Sharks (assistant)
- 2018: Xinjiang Flying Tigers
- 2018–2019: Xinjiang Flying Tigers (assistant)
- 2019–2020: Zhejiang Lions (assistant)
- 2020–2022: Illawarra Hawks
- 2022–2023: Bay Area Dragons
- 2024–present: Sydney Kings

Career highlights
- As coach: 7× NBL champion (1992, 1996, 2003–2005, 2009, 2026); 7× NBL Coach of the Year (1992, 1997, 1998, 2002, 2008, 2009, 2026); 1× CBA Coach of the Year (2014); 2× CBA All-Star Game Southern Division assistant coach (2012, 2014)

Brian Warwick Goorjian (born 28 June 1953) is an American-Australian professional basketball coach and former player who is the head coach of the Sydney Kings of the National Basketball League (NBL). In an NBL coaching career spanning over 20 years, Goorjian has won seven championships: two with the South East Melbourne Magic, four with the Sydney Kings and one with the South Dragons. He previously served as the head coach of the Australia men's national basketball team from 2001 to 2008 and again from 2020 to 2024.

In 2009, Goorjian became the head coach of the Dongguan Leopards of the Chinese Basketball Association (CBA) and stayed with the team for six seasons. He served as an assistant coach for the Guangdong Southern Tigers from 2015 to 2016 and as a special advisor to the Shanghai Sharks from 2016 to 2018. Goorjian returned to coaching duties when he joined the Xinjiang Flying Tigers in 2018 as an assistant coach for one season. After spending a decade in the CBA, he returned to the NBL in 2020 as the head coach of the Illawarra Hawks. In 2024, he returned to the Kings as head coach, returning to the team he last coached in 2008.

Goorjian was inducted into the Australian Basketball Hall of Fame in 2013.

== Early career ==
Goorjian was born in Glendale, California, and is of Armenian descent. He played on the basketball team at Crescenta Valley High School in La Crescenta, California, and was coached by his father, Ed. Goorjian's younger brothers, Kevin and Greg, also played basketball at Crescenta Valley. He played college basketball for the Pepperdine Waves.

Goorjian first arrived in Australia in 1977 to play for the Melbourne Tigers under head coach Lindsay Gaze. He served as the inaugural captain of the Tigers in their first National Basketball League (NBL) season in 1984.

== Coaching career ==
=== Ballarat Miners (1986–1987) ===
Goorjian served as the inaugural head coach of the Ballarat Miners in the South East Australian Basketball League (SEABL) in 1986. He went on to guide the Miners to the SEABL South Conference championship in 1987.

=== Eastside Spectres (1988–1991) ===
Goorjian's first NBL head coaching job came in 1988 when he coached the Eastside Spectres. The team missed the finals in Goorjian's first two seasons. In 1990, the Spectres bowed out in the semi-finals and the next year they went one better by making the Grand Final for only the second time in the club's history. They lost this final to the defending champion Perth Wildcats. The Spectres merged with the Southern Melbourne Saints during the 1992 offseason to form the South East Melbourne Magic with Goorjian named as the new Magic coach.

=== South East Melbourne Magic (1992–1998) ===
Goorjian won the first of his six championships in 1992 against the Melbourne Tigers and was named the Lindsay Gaze Coach of the Year. Three consecutive semi-final losses were followed by a second championship and another Coach of the Year award in 1996 when they again defeated the Tigers. Two Grand Final losses were to follow to the Tigers in 1997 and the Adelaide 36ers in 1998.

Following the loss to the 36ers, Goorjian had another change of team by merger when the Magic merged with cross-town rivals the North Melbourne Giants to form the Victoria Titans.

=== Victoria Titans (1998–2002) ===
Goorjian lost another two Grand Finals in his first two seasons as coach for the Titans. The Titans lost 2–1 to defending champions Adelaide in 1998–99 before being swept 2–0 by the Perth Wildcats in 1999–2000. At the end of the 2001–02 season, the financially struggling Victoria Titans went into administration and were sold to new owners associated with the former North Melbourne Giants, who controversially fired Goorjian.

=== Sydney Kings (2002–2008) ===
The Sydney Kings hired Goorjian after the 2001–02 season to replace Brett Brown. Goorjian led the Kings to three consecutive NBL championships from 2003 to 2005. Goorjian coached Sydney to five Grand Final series in six years, despite being forced to constantly re-build the team after each season. He won his fifth NBL Coach of the Year award as the Kings went 27–3 during the 2007–08 regular season. However, they were unable to turn this success into a fourth championship, going down narrowly to the Melbourne Tigers.

=== South Dragons (2008–2009) ===
On April 1, 2008, Goorjian signed a three-year contract with new Melbourne club South Dragons. Goorjian led the Dragons to the 2008–09 NBL title in his first season with them. He won his sixth Coach of the Year award with the Dragons in 2009. The Dragons folded at the end of the season despite their title win, prompting Goorjian to seek a position overseas.

=== Dongguan Leopards (2009–2015) ===
Goorjian served as the head coach of the Dongguan Leopards in the CBA from 2009 to 2015.

=== Guangdong Tigers (2015–2016) ===
Goorjian became associate coach of the Guangdong Southern Tigers in 2015.

=== Shanghai Sharks (2016–2018) ===
Goorjian served as an assistant coach with the Shanghai Sharks between 2016 and 2018.

=== Xinjiang Flying Tigers (2018–2019) ===
On May 6, 2018, Goorjian signed with the Xinjiang Flying Tigers as head coach. He later transitioned to an assistant coaching role in December during the 2018–19 CBA season.

=== Zhejiang Lions (2019–2020) ===
Goorijan served as an assistant coach with Zhejiang Lions in the 2019–20 CBA season.

=== Illawarra Hawks (2020–2022) ===
On 23 June 2020, returned to Australia and signed with Illawarra Hawks of the NBL as their new head coach. He elected to not take up his third-year option with the Hawks in May 2022, instead moving to the role of special advisor for basketball operations.

=== Bay Area Dragons (2022–2023) ===
Goorijan served as head coach of the Bay Area Dragons during the 2022–23 PBA Commissioner's Cup.

=== Return to Sydney (2024–present) ===
On 6 March 2024, Goorijan signed a three-year deal to return as head coach of the Sydney Kings. He coached his 850th NBL game in January 2025.

In the 2025–26 NBL season, Goorijan guided his Kings to a league-best 24–9 record and subsequently won his seventh NBL Coach of the Year Award. He went on to guide the Kings to the championship, collecting his seventh NBL title.

== National team career ==
In late 2001, Goorjian was appointed head coach of the Australia men's national basketball team, becoming the first foreign-born coach in the team's history. He guided the Boomers to Olympic campaigns in Athens in 2004 and Beijing in 2008, a World Cup in 2006 and a gold Commonwealth Games medal in Melbourne in the same year. He stepped down in 2008.

In November 2020, Goorjian returned as Boomers head coach. In 2021, at the 2020 Summer Olympics, the team won the bronze medal which was Australia's first ever medal in Olympic men's basketball. He stepped down as head coach following the 2024 Summer Olympics.

== Coaching profile ==
Having won 511 games at a winning percentage of 70% Goorjian's record exceeds that of Australian coaching legends in the other major professional leagues including Kevin Sheedy (AFL – 365), Allan Jeans (AFL – 358), Tom Hafey (AFL – 336), David Parkin (AFL – 306), Wayne Bennett (NRL – 294 wins) and Tim Sheens (NRL – 235). In 2003 the NBL Hall of Fame selection committee voted Goorjian the best coach of the first 25 years of the National Basketball League. In one of the notable statistics in sport, Goorjian-coached teams finished no worse than the semi-finals every year from 1990 to 2009. He has also coached teams to a record 12 grand finals and won 'Coach of the Year' on six occasions.

Goorjian is also known for his intense coaching style (contrasting the laid back style of his early mentor Lindsay Gaze). His former assistant coach Bill Tomlinson says the detail he paid to defence was notable, as was the emphasis on strength and conditioning which often made Goorjian coached teams the fittest in the league. He said he sat down for his first six games in 1988, which he lost, and has stood during games ever since.

On October 10, 2013, Goorjian was named the coach of the Sydney Kings 25th Anniversary Team.

== Coaching record ==
=== NBL ===
Legend
Regular season	G	Games coached	W	Games won	L	Games lost	W–L %	Win–loss %
Playoffs	PG	Playoff games	PW	Playoff wins	PL	Playoff losses	PW–L %	Playoff win–loss %

Team	Year	G	W	L	W–L%	Finish	PG	PW	PL	PW–L%	Result
Eastside Spectres	1988	24	11	13	.458	8th	—	—	—	—	Missed playoffs
Eastside Spectres	1989	24	14	10	.583	7th	—	—	—	—	Missed playoffs
Eastside Spectres	1990	26	18	8	.692	2nd	2	0	2	.000	Semi-finalists
Eastside Spectres	1991	26	17	9	.654	2nd	5	3	2	.600	Grand Finalists
South East Melbourne Magic	1992	24	20	4	.833	1st	7	6	1	.857	Champions
South East Melbourne Magic	1993	26	20	6	.769	2nd	4	2	2	.500	Semi-finalists
South East Melbourne Magic	1994	26	19	7	.731	3rd	3	1	2	.333	Semi-finalists
South East Melbourne Magic	1995	26	18	8	.692	3rd	6	3	3	.500	Semi-finalists
South East Melbourne Magic	1996	26	19	7	.731	1st	7	6	1	.857	Champions
South East Melbourne Magic	1997	30	22	8	.733	1st	5	3	2	.600	Grand Finalists
South East Melbourne Magic	1998	30	26	4	.867	1st	4	2	2	.500	Grand Finalists
Victoria Titans	1998–99	26	17	9	.654	2nd	7	4	3	.571	Grand Finalists
Victoria Titans	1999–2000	28	20	8	.714	4th	8	4	4	.500	Grand Finalists
Victoria Titans	2000–01	28	21	7	.750	4th	6	3	3	.500	Semi-finalists
Victoria Titans	2001–02	30	20	10	.667	1st	6	3	3	.500	Semi-finalists
Sydney Kings	2002–03	30	22	8	.733	1st	8	6	2	.750	Champions
Sydney Kings	2003–04	35	27	8	.771	1st	5	4	1	.667	Champions
Sydney Kings	2004–05	29	20	9	.690	1st	8	6	2	.750	Champions
Sydney Kings	2005–06	32	25	7	.781	2nd	5	3	2	.600	Grand Finalists
Sydney Kings	2006–07	33	20	13	.606	4th	3	1	2	.333	Semi-finalists
Sydney Kings	2007–08	30	27	3	.900	1st	8	4	4	.500	Grand Finalists
South Dragons	2008–09	30	22	8	.733	1st	8	5	3	.625	Champions
Illawarra Hawks	2020–21	36	20	16	.556	3rd	3	1	2	.333	Semi-finalists
Illawarra Hawks	2021–22	28	18	9	.667	2nd	2	0	2	.000	Semi-finalists
Sydney Kings	2024–25	29	16	13	.552	5th	1	0	1	.000	Semi-finalists
Sydney Kings	2025–26	33	24	9	.727	1st	7	5	2	.714	Champions
Career		745	524	221	.709		128	75	53	.586	

== Personal life ==
Goorjian is an Australian citizen. He has a daughter with his wife, Amanda.
