= Mark Bradtke =

Australian basketball player (born 1969)

Personal information
- Born: 27 September 1969 (age 57) Adelaide, South Australia, Australia
- Listed height: 6 ft 11 in (2.11 m)
- Listed weight: 265 lb (120 kg)

Career information
- High school: Redcliffe State (Redcliffe, Queensland)
- NBA draft: 1991: undrafted
- Playing career: 1988–2007
- Position: Centre / power forward
- Number: 7, 50, 12

Career history
- 1988–1992: Adelaide 36ers
- 1992: Juver Murcia
- 1993–2005: Melbourne Tigers
- 1996–1997: Philadelphia 76ers
- 2002: Olympiacos
- 2005–2007: Brisbane Bullets

Career highlights
- 3× NBL champion (1993, 1997, 2007); NBL Most Valuable Player (2002); 6× NBL All-Star (1992-1994, 1996, 1997, 2005); 10× All-NBL First Team (1994, 1996, 1997, 1999–2005); 2× All-NBL Third Team (1992, 1998); NBL Most Improved Player (1989); NBL 20th Anniversary Team (1998); NBL 25th Anniversary Team (2003); No. 50 retired by Melbourne Tigers; 2× Gaze Medal winner (1992, 1999); Australian Basketball Hall of Fame (2013)
- Stats at NBA.com
- Stats at Basketball Reference

Mark Robert Bradtke (born 27 September 1969) is an Australian former professional basketball player who played mainly in Australia's National Basketball League, but also had a single stint in the National Basketball Association (NBA) with the Philadelphia 76ers in 1996–97. As well as his outstanding play, Bradtke was known in the early part of his NBL career for his mullet haircut.

In 2013 Bradtke was inducted into the Australian Basketball Hall of Fame for his contributions to basketball both in the NBL and for Basketball Australia.

== Australian career ==
=== Adelaide 36ers ===
Bradtke was born in the southern Adelaide suburb of Noarlunga and began playing basketball in 1984 while attending Redcliffe State High School north of Brisbane in Queensland (by that stage he was already 6 ft 8 in (203 cm)). Spotted by Adelaide 36ers coach Ken Cole who signed him to the 36ers as a 16-year-old, Bradtke was tipped to make his NBL debut in 1986, but he decided to attend the Australian Institute of Sport where he attended on a scholarship in 1986 and 1987.

Bradtke started his NBL career with the Adelaide 36ers in 1988, though by that time the team was being coached by Gary Fox. That same year saw the now 6 ft 10 in (208 cm) Bradtke was a member of the Australian Boomers team at the 1988 Summer Olympics in Seoul, South Korea, helping the team to an Olympic best ever finish of fourth place with a 4–4 record, losing the bronze medal game to the United States team which included future NBA players Dan Majerle and David Robinson. At the time, 18-year-old Bradtke was the youngest player ever having represented Australia in Basketball at the Summer Olympics (he would turn 19 during the preliminary rounds).

Bradtke's star continued to rise in the NBL and in 1989 was named the NBL's Most Improved Player. After playing back up centre to 6 ft 9 in (206 cm) 36ers team captain Bill Jones in 1988 (and playing some games at power forward), with Jones departing the team for the Ken Cole-coached Newcastle Falcons, Bradtke made the centre position his own in 1989 and 1990, averaging 17.4 points and 9.3 rebounds per game over 24 games in 1990.

Bradtke would spend another two seasons with the 36ers before taking up a short contract with Spanish club Juver Murcia following the 1992 Olympics in Barcelona, Spain. Before he left he signed an agreement with the 36ers stating that he would finish his one-year contract with the club should he return within a certain time. Upon his return to Australia, Bradtke stated his intention not to return to the 36ers with the Melbourne Tigers rumoured to be actively chasing him. After protracted negotiations with 36ers management that led to the Tigers being prepared to buy out his remaining contract, the NBL stepped in and vetoed the buy out, effectively letting Bradtke leave for Melbourne without the 36ers receiving any compensation for the remainder of his contract with the club. For Bradtke personally, the move to Melbourne allowed him to be closer to his then girlfriend and later wife, internationally ranked tennis player Nicole Provis. Despite playing only 17 games in 1992 in what would prove to be his last season in Adelaide, Bradtke was second in total rebounds for the 36ers to Mark Davis and in his final game for the club against the Geelong Supercats at the Clipsal Powerhouse he scored a career high 43 points and grabbed 25 boards in a dominating performance. In all, Bradtke played 118 games for the Adelaide 36ers, including 9 finals games, averaging 15.4 points, 9.6 rebounds and 1.6 blocks per game.

Despite his less than harmonious split from the 36ers in 1992 which resulted in the Adelaide crowd regularly booing Bradtke for the rest of his career, in November 2015 Adelaide fans finally recognised his contribution not only to the 36ers but also the NBL when they voted him the best centre to ever play for the 36ers in an online poll conducted by Adelaide's daily newspaper The Advertiser. Bradtke received 35.71% of the votes to beat out former teammate Bill Jones (25.17%) and 36ers triple championship winning centre Paul Rees (23.81%).

=== Melbourne Tigers ===
After spending the NBL off-season with Spanish League team Juver Murcia, Bradtke started with the Tigers in 1993, and after a slow start came on strong from mid-season helping the team to their fifth NBL playoffs in a row and their second grand final series in succession. Melbourne won their first ever NBL Championship with a 2–1 series win over the Perth Wildcats which included their first ever win at the Perth Entertainment Centre in the third and deciding game. He averaged 17 points, 12.7 rebounds and 1.5 blocks per game in 33 games played in 1993. Combining with star players Andrew Gaze (a fellow Boomer) and American imports Lanard Copeland and Dave Simmons, Bradtke's arrival helped transform the Tigers from a pretenders to a genuine championship team. The team would win their second NBL title in 1997 when they defeated cross-Melbourne rivals the South East Melbourne Magic 2–1 in the Grand Final, reversing the result from the 1996 series.

While with the 36ers, Bradtke established himself as one of the premier centres in the NBL and following the Tigers 1993 championship, the then twice Olympic representative was regarded as the best centre in the league. Bradtke's form with the Tigers continued over the next nine seasons before finally receiving the ultimate individual accolade by being crowned the 2001–02 NBL Most Valuable Player. He was also voted to the All NBL First Team in 1994, 1996, 1997 and consecutively from 1999 to 2005 and was also selected to the NBL 20th Anniversary Team in 1998 and the NBL 25th Anniversary Team in 2003.

=== Brisbane Bullets ===
After 377 NBL games with the Melbourne Tigers, Bradtke played his last season with them in 2004–05. For the 2005–06 season he signed with the Brisbane Bullets, winning his third NBL title when the Bullets defeated his former team the Melbourne Tigers 3–1 in the 2006–07 NBL Grand Final series. After the grand final, and 59 games in two seasons with the Bullets, the 38-year-old Bradtke retired from playing professional basketball having played in four NBL Grand Finals (winning three)

Bradtke retired as the NBL's all-time leading rebounder pulling down 6,283 rebounds (4,279 def, 2,004 off) at 11.3 per game. This record still stands as of the 2016–17 NBL season. On 21 November 2003, Bradtke broke the previous NBL rebounds record of 5,200 held by his former Adelaide 36ers teammate Mark Davis at the Distinctive Homes Dome in Adelaide (now known as the Titanium Security Arena). Davis, who still makes Adelaide his home, was on hand to present Bradtke with the game ball in recognition of his achievement. Bradtke led the NBL in rebounding in 1992 (14.8), 1994 (14.5), 1998–99 (13.3), 1999–00 (14.8), 2000–01 (14.1), 2001–02 (13.1), 2002–03 (12.9) and 2003–04 (10.9).

Bradtke is also third on the all-time list of NBL blocked shots with 763 at 1.3 per game

== International career ==
Bradtke was a prominent player for the Australian Boomers, making his debut in 1987 at the age of 17 in a home test series against the visiting Soviet Union. At the time the Boomers team was drawn from the NBL with Bradtke still attending the AIS. For the series, Bradtke was the 3rd big man in the squad behind veteran 6 ft 10 in (208 cm) centre Ray Borner and Brisbane Bullet's 6 ft 10 in (208 cm) centre John Dorge who was also making his Boomers debut in the series.

Bradtke would go on to play in the 1988, 1992, 1996 and 2000 Summer Olympic Games, helping the Boomers to the bronze medal game in 1988, 1996, and at home in Sydney in 2000. He also represented Australia at the 1990 and 1994 FIBA World Championship. At the 1988 Olympics in Seoul, Bradtke became the youngest player to ever represent Australia in basketball at the Summer Olympic Games at age 18 (he turned 19 during the 1988 Olympics).

No matter what sport you play, you want to be at your best, playing against the best and that's what the Olympic Games were all about. You can go in there thinking you're ready, but then it hits you that you're playing against the best players in the world, who are more athletic, can jump higher and run faster, you have to find a way to perform and that's what I loved about Olympic competition.

— Mark Bradtke in 2013 on competing at the Olympics.

Despite playing nearly all of his NBL career as a centre owing to his 6 ft 11 in (211 cm) height, Bradtke played most of his international career for the Boomers as a starting power forward, as the preferred starting centre was 7 ft 2 in (218 cm) Chicago Bulls NBA championship player Luc Longley.

Overall, Bradtke played in 179 games for the Boomers and was a two-time winner of the "Gaze Medal" as the Australian Boomers International Player of the Year (1992, 1999).

== NBA ==
At the age of 28, Bradtke signed with the Philadelphia 76ers in the NBA during the 1996–97 NBA season for a reported $247,500. He played 36 games for Philadelphia, averaging 1.6 points, 1.9 rebounds, 0.1 blocks and 7 minutes court time per game.

== Europe ==
Following the end of the 1992 NBL season with the 36ers Bradtke played the 1992–93 Spanish League season with Juver Murcia. The team finished 22nd and were relegated the next season. He also spent part of 2002 playing with Greek League club Olympiacos.

== Coaching career ==
Bradtke was appointed head coach of the Gold Coast Rollers women's team in the NBL1 North for the 2025 season.

== Personal life ==
Bradtke has been married to the Australian former professional tennis player Nicole Provis since 1994. Together they have two boys, Austin (born 2000) and Jensen (born 2004). Austin was selected by the Melbourne Football Club as a category B rookie and will join the club from 2019.

== Honour roll ==
NBL career:	1988–2007
NBL Grand Final appearances:	4 (1993, 1996, 1997, 2006–07)
NBL Championships:	3 (1993, 1997, 2006–07)
NBL Most Valuable Player:	2002
All-NBL First Team:	10 (1994, 1996, 1997, 1999–2005)
NBL Most Improved Player:	1989
NBL 20th Anniversary Team:	1998
NBL 25th Anniversary Team:	2003
NBL Leading Rebounder	8 (1992, 1994, 1999–2004)
Gaze Medal	2 (1992, 1999)
Australian Basketball Hall of Fame	2013

== NBL career stats ==
Games:	554 (Adl 118, Melb 377, Bris 59)
Rebounds:	6,283 (4,279 def, 2,004 off - 1st All-time - 11.3pg)
Points:	9,621 (17.3pg)
Free Throws:	1,665 / 2,508 (66.4%)
Field goals:	3,959 / 7,419 (53.4%)
3 Points:	38 / 148 (25.7%)
Blocked Shots:	763 (3rd All-time, 1.3pg)
