= Jason Smith (basketball, born 1974) =

Australian basketball player

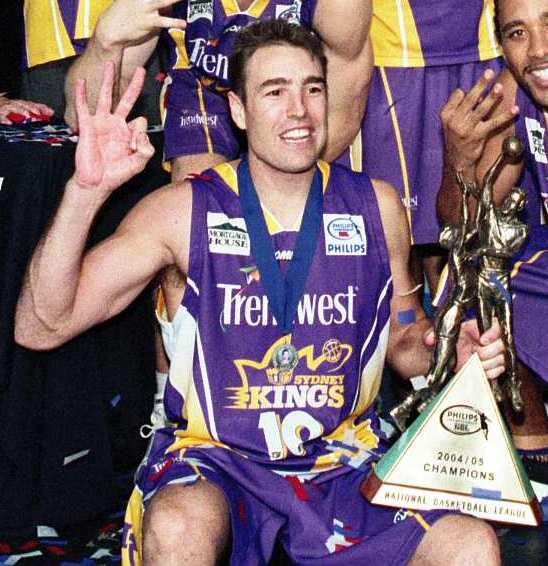
- Smith with the Sydney Kings in 2005

Personal information
- Born: 20 October 1974 (age 52) Melbourne, Victoria, Australia
- Listed height: 6 ft 5 in (1.96 m)
- Listed weight: 207 lb (94 kg)

Career information
- High school: Vermont Secondary College
- College: Cal Lutheran (1993–1994)
- Playing career: 1995–2009
- Position: Shooting guard / small forward

Career history
- 1995–1998: South East Melbourne Magic
- 1999–2002: Victoria Titans
- 2002–2003: Rida Scafati
- 2003: Scavolini Pesaro
- 2003–2007: Sydney Kings
- 2005: KK Cibona
- 2008–2009: Sydney Spirit

Career highlights
- 3× NBL champion (1996, 2004, 2005); NBL Grand Final MVP (2005); 2× All-NBL First Team (2001, 2005); 2× All-NBL Second Team (2000, 2006); NBL Best Sixth Man (1998)
Medals
Men's basketball
Representing Australia
Gold medal – first place	2006 Melbourne

Jason Mathew Smith (born 20 October 1974) is an Australian former professional basketball player. On 10 October 2013, Smith was named in the Sydney Kings 25th Anniversary Team.

== Professional career ==
Smith's career began with the South East Melbourne Magic and was just starting to find his feet when the club folded. Smith then signed with new franchise Victoria Titans who elected to keep his contract. Smith contributed to the success of the Titans that saw them reach consecutive Grand Finals, in 1999 and 2000, of which they did not win. Victoria soon folded and Smith signed a contract with the Sydney Kings. Although Smith struggled during his first season with Sydney, he excelled during the playoff series, leading Sydney Kings to an NBL championship and Smith was named Grand Final MVP. Outside of the NBL, Smith has had a few short stints in Europe where he played on Croatian team Cibona Zagreb and two Italian teams; Rida Scafati and Scavolini Pesaro. On 18 June 2009, Smith announced his retirement from basketball.

== National team career ==
From 1999 to 2009, Smith played for the Australia men's national basketball team, the Boomers. He represented Australia at the 2000 Sydney and 2004 Athens Olympic Games as well as the 2006 Commonwealth Games and Captained the Boomers at the 2006 FIBA World Championship in Japan

== Personal ==
Smith is a Christian.
