= Ed Goorjian =

American basketball coach (1926–2022)

Biographical details
- Born: September 26, 1926; Los Angeles, California, U.S.
- Died: December 11, 2022 (aged 96); Los Angeles, California, U.S.
- Education: Los Angeles CC

Coaching career (HC unless noted)
- 1960–1978: Crescenta Valley HS
- 1978–1979: Glendale CC
- 1979–1980: Loyola Marymount (assistant)
- 1980–1985: Loyola Marymount
- 1992: UNLV (assistant)

Head coaching record
- Overall: 44–92

Edward Goorjian (September 26, 1926 – December 11, 2022) was an American college basketball coach. He served as the head coach of the Loyola Marymount Lions men's team from 1980 to 1985.

== Early life ==
Goorjian was born in Los Angeles, California, on September 26, 1926 to Armenian parents who had survived the Armenian genocide. He played basketball as a guard at Los Angeles High School and was selected to the All-Los Angeles City High School Third Team by the Helms Athletic Foundation in 1945. He played college basketball for Los Angeles City College.

== Coaching career ==
Goorjian became the inaugural head coach of the boys' basketball team at Crescenta Valley High School in 1960. He served as coach for eighteen seasons and won seven league championships. Goorjian accumulated a 328–103 record from 1962 to 1978. His three sons – Brian, Kevin and Greg – played for him on the team. His 1970–71 team that accumulated a 29–1 record is considered the greatest basketball team in the school's history and was inducted into the Crescenta Valley Hall of Fame in 2013.

Goorjian left Crescenta Valley to coach at Glendale Community College for one season. He served as an assistant coach for the Loyola Marymount Lions during the 1979–80 season before he was appointed head coach in 1980. He coached his son Greg on the team during the 1982–83 season when he transferred from the UNLV Runnin' Rebels. Goorjian's teams struggled and he was dismissed as the Lions' head coach in 1985.

Goorjian served as an assistant coach for George McQuarn with the Cal State Fullerton Titans and was then hired by the Saudi Arabian royal family to coach the country's top club team. He served as an assistant coach for the UNLV Runnin' Rebels in 1992. Goorjian retired from coaching in 1993.

Goorjian was inducted into the CIF Southern Section Hall of Fame in 2015.

== Death ==
Goorjian died in Los Angeles on December 11, 2022, at the age of 96.
