= 2000–01 NBL season =

Professional basketball season

- League: National Basketball League
- Season: 2000–01
- Dates: 20 October 2000 – 29 April 2001
- Teams: 11
- TV partners: Australia: ABC; Fox Sports

Regular season
- Season champions: Victoria Titans
- Season MVP: (United States) Robert Rose (Townsville)

Finals
- Champions: Wollongong Hawks (1st title)
- Runners-up: Townsville Crocodiles
- Semifinalists: Victoria Titans; Adelaide 36ers
- Finals MVP: (Australia) Glen Saville (Wollongong)

Statistical leaders
Points	(Australia) Andrew Gaze (Melbourne)	29.1
Rebounds	(Australia) Mark Bradtke (Melbourne)	14.1
Assists	(Australia) Darryl McDonald (Victoria)	7.9

NBL seasons
- ← 1999–2000 2001–02 →

The 2000–01 NBL season was the 23rd season of competition since its establishment in 1979. A total of 11 teams contested the league.

== Regular season ==
The 2000–01 regular season took place over 24 rounds between 20 October 2000 and 31 March 2001.

=== Round 1 ===
Date	Home	Score	Away	Venue	Crowd	Boxscore
20/10/2000	Brisbane Bullets	80–95	Victoria Titans	Brisbane Convention & Exhibition Centre	N/A	boxscore
20/10/2000	Wollongong Hawks	97–115	West Sydney Razorbacks	WIN Entertainment Centre	N/A	boxscore
21/10/2000	Melbourne Tigers	122–103	Canberra Cannons	Hisense Arena	N/A	boxscore
21/10/2000	Perth Wildcats	84–92	Adelaide 36ers	Perth Entertainment Centre	N/A	boxscore
21/10/2000	Townsville Crocodiles	120–85	Cairns Taipans	Townsville Entertainment Centre	N/A	boxscore
22/10/2000	Victoria Titans	110–93	West Sydney Razorbacks	Hisense Arena	N/A	boxscore
23/10/2000	Canberra Cannons	98–104	Sydney Kings	AIS Arena	N/A	boxscore

=== Round 2 ===
Date	Home	Score	Away	Venue	Crowd	Boxscore
27/10/2000	Victoria Titans	81–88	Wollongong Hawks	Hisense Arena	N/A	boxscore
28/10/2000	Adelaide 36ers	92–81	Sydney Kings	Adelaide Arena	N/A	boxscore
28/10/2000	Brisbane Bullets	93–115	Townsville Crocodiles	Brisbane Convention & Exhibition Centre	N/A	boxscore
28/10/2000	Canberra Cannons	88–86	Cairns Taipans	AIS Arena	N/A	boxscore
29/10/2000	Victoria Titans	106–98	Cairns Taipans	Hisense Arena	N/A	boxscore
29/10/2000	Melbourne Tigers	111–118	Wollongong Hawks	Hisense Arena	N/A	boxscore
30/10/2000	Perth Wildcats	119–100	Sydney Kings	Perth Entertainment Centre	N/A	boxscore
30/10/2000	West Sydney Razorbacks	94–114	Adelaide 36ers	Penrith Sports Stadium	N/A	boxscore

=== Round 3 ===
Date	Home	Score	Away	Venue	Crowd	Boxscore
3/11/2000	Adelaide 36ers	112–83	Canberra Cannons	Adelaide Arena	N/A	boxscore
3/11/2000	Sydney Kings	110–84	Perth Wildcats	Sydney Entertainment Centre	N/A	boxscore
3/11/2000	Townsville Crocodiles	112–96	West Sydney Razorbacks	Townsville Entertainment Centre	N/A	boxscore
4/11/2000	Cairns Taipans	99–103	West Sydney Razorbacks	Cairns Convention Centre	N/A	boxscore
4/11/2000	Victoria Titans	108–113	Melbourne Tigers	Hisense Arena	N/A	boxscore
4/11/2000	Wollongong Hawks	106–79	Brisbane Bullets	WIN Entertainment Centre	3,767	boxscore
5/11/2000	Perth Wildcats	99–71	Canberra Cannons	Perth Entertainment Centre	N/A	boxscore

=== Round 4 ===
Date	Home	Score	Away	Venue	Crowd	Boxscore
10/11/2000	Cairns Taipans	87–96	Perth Wildcats	Cairns Convention Centre	N/A	boxscore
11/11/2000	Townsville Crocodiles	106–98	Perth Wildcats	Townsville Entertainment Centre	N/A	boxscore
11/11/2000	Canberra Cannons	91–124	Adelaide 36ers	AIS Arena	N/A	boxscore
11/11/2000	Sydney Kings	113–101	West Sydney Razorbacks	Sydney Super Dome	N/A	boxscore
11/11/2000	Victoria Titans	112–92	Brisbane Bullets	Hisense Arena	N/A	boxscore
12/11/2000	Melbourne Tigers	111–93	Brisbane Bullets	Hisense Arena	N/A	boxscore
13/11/2000	Wollongong Hawks	120–117	Adelaide 36ers	WIN Entertainment Centre	3,547	boxscore

=== Round 5 ===
Date	Home	Score	Away	Venue	Crowd	Boxscore
17/11/2000	West Sydney Razorbacks	101–112	Victoria Titans	State Sports Centre	N/A	boxscore
17/11/2000	Adelaide 36ers	121–105	Townsville Crocodiles	Adelaide Arena	N/A	boxscore
18/11/2000	Brisbane Bullets	97–88	Cairns Taipans	Brisbane Convention & Exhibition Centre	N/A	boxscore
18/11/2000	Canberra Cannons	88–102	Wollongong Hawks	AIS Arena	N/A	boxscore
18/11/2000	Melbourne Tigers	119–129	Sydney Kings	Hisense Arena	N/A	boxscore
18/11/2000	Perth Wildcats	121–108	Townsville Crocodiles	Perth Entertainment Centre	N/A	boxscore

=== Round 6 ===
Date	Home	Score	Away	Venue	Crowd	Boxscore
24/11/2000	Brisbane Bullets	94–91	Sydney Kings	Brisbane Convention & Exhibition Centre	N/A	boxscore
24/11/2000	West Sydney Razorbacks	91–92	Perth Wildcats	State Sports Centre	N/A	boxscore
25/11/2000	Cairns Taipans	86–97	Melbourne Tigers	Cairns Convention Centre	N/A	boxscore
25/11/2000	Adelaide 36ers	102–81	Canberra Cannons	Adelaide Arena	N/A	boxscore
25/11/2000	Wollongong Hawks	99–104	Perth Wildcats	WIN Entertainment Centre	4,012	boxscore
26/11/2000	Townsville Crocodiles	120–106	Melbourne Tigers	Townsville Entertainment Centre	N/A	boxscore

=== Round 7 ===
Date	Home	Score	Away	Venue	Crowd	Boxscore
1/12/2000	Wollongong Hawks	111–98	Brisbane Bullets	Shoalhaven Basketball Stadium	600	boxscore
1/12/2000	Adelaide 36ers	113–90	West Sydney Razorbacks	Adelaide Arena	N/A	boxscore
1/12/2000	Townsville Crocodiles	94–111	Victoria Titans	Townsville Entertainment Centre	N/A	boxscore
2/12/2000	Cairns Taipans	81–98	Victoria Titans	Cairns Convention Centre	N/A	boxscore
2/12/2000	Melbourne Tigers	121–115	Adelaide 36ers	Hisense Arena	N/A	boxscore
2/12/2000	Perth Wildcats	124–105	West Sydney Razorbacks	Perth Entertainment Centre	N/A	boxscore
3/12/2000	Canberra Cannons	92–78	Brisbane Bullets	AIS Arena	N/A	boxscore

=== Round 8 ===
Date	Home	Score	Away	Venue	Crowd	Boxscore
8/12/2000	West Sydney Razorbacks	93–101	Cairns Taipans	State Sports Centre	N/A	boxscore
8/12/2000	Perth Wildcats	116–98	Brisbane Bullets	Perth Entertainment Centre	N/A	boxscore
9/12/2000	Adelaide 36ers	90–74	Brisbane Bullets	Adelaide Arena	N/A	boxscore
9/12/2000	Sydney Kings	129–113	Melbourne Tigers	Sydney Super Dome	N/A	boxscore
9/12/2000	Wollongong Hawks	105–97	Cairns Taipans	WIN Entertainment Centre	3,245	boxscore
11/12/2000	Victoria Titans	104–90	Townsville Crocodiles	Hisense Arena	N/A	boxscore

=== Round 9 ===
Date	Home	Score	Away	Venue	Crowd	Boxscore
14/12/2000	Sydney Kings	96–90	Adelaide 36ers	Sydney Super Dome	N/A	boxscore
15/12/2000	Canberra Cannons	92–101	Melbourne Tigers	AIS Arena	N/A	boxscore
15/12/2000	Brisbane Bullets	90–95	Adelaide 36ers	Brisbane Convention & Exhibition Centre	N/A	boxscore
15/12/2000	Wollongong Hawks	90–116	Townsville Crocodiles	WIN Entertainment Centre	N/A	boxscore
16/12/2000	West Sydney Razorbacks	112–118	Townsville Crocodiles	State Sports Centre	N/A	boxscore
16/12/2000	Perth Wildcats	103–95	Victoria Titans	Perth Entertainment Centre	N/A	boxscore

=== Round 10 ===
Date	Home	Score	Away	Venue	Crowd	Boxscore
21/12/2000	Canberra Cannons	97–112	Perth Wildcats	Albury Stadium	N/A	boxscore
22/12/2000	Sydney Kings	93–86	Cairns Taipans	Sydney Super Dome	N/A	boxscore
23/12/2000	Adelaide 36ers	109–93	Cairns Taipans	Adelaide Arena	N/A	boxscore
23/12/2000	Melbourne Tigers	116–126	Perth Wildcats	Hisense Arena	N/A	boxscore
23/12/2000	West Sydney Razorbacks	114–92	Brisbane Bullets	State Sports Centre	N/A	boxscore
23/12/2000	Wollongong Hawks	111–109	Canberra Cannons	WIN Entertainment Centre	N/A	boxscore
26/12/2000	Victoria Titans	100–82	Sydney Kings	Hisense Arena	N/A	boxscore

=== Round 11 ===
Date	Home	Score	Away	Venue	Crowd	Boxscore
29/12/2000	West Sydney Razorbacks	107–109	Melbourne Tigers	State Sports Centre	N/A	boxscore
30/12/2000	Cairns Taipans	98–89	Brisbane Bullets	Cairns Convention Centre	N/A	boxscore
30/12/2000	Victoria Titans	138–99	Canberra Cannons	Hisense Arena	N/A	boxscore
30/12/2000	Wollongong Hawks	116–103	Sydney Kings	WIN Entertainment Centre	5,550	boxscore
31/12/2000	Adelaide 36ers	91–104	Perth Wildcats	Adelaide Arena	N/A	boxscore
31/12/2000	Townsville Crocodiles	92–90	West Sydney Razorbacks	Townsville Entertainment Centre	N/A	boxscore

=== Round 12 ===
Date	Home	Score	Away	Venue	Crowd	Boxscore
5/01/2001	Adelaide 36ers	116–75	Cairns Taipans	Adelaide Arena	N/A	boxscore
5/01/2001	Brisbane Bullets	102–96	Sydney Kings	Brisbane Convention & Exhibition Centre	N/A	boxscore
5/01/2001	Victoria Titans	107–95	West Sydney Razorbacks	Hisense Arena	N/A	boxscore
6/01/2001	Canberra Cannons	88–86	Brisbane Bullets	AIS Arena	N/A	boxscore
6/01/2001	Melbourne Tigers	104–116	Adelaide 36ers	Hisense Arena	N/A	boxscore
6/01/2001	Perth Wildcats	109–83	Cairns Taipans	Perth Entertainment Centre	N/A	boxscore
6/01/2001	Townsville Crocodiles	100–105	Wollongong Hawks	Townsville Entertainment Centre	5,257	boxscore

=== Round 13 ===
Date	Home	Score	Away	Venue	Crowd	Boxscore
12/01/2001	Cairns Taipans	109–112	Wollongong Hawks	Cairns Convention Centre	4,242	boxscore
13/01/2001	Brisbane Bullets	80–83	Wollongong Hawks	Brisbane Convention & Exhibition Centre	N/A	boxscore
13/01/2001	Canberra Cannons	92–107	Townsville Crocodiles	AIS Arena	N/A	boxscore
13/01/2001	Perth Wildcats	132–112	Melbourne Tigers	Perth Entertainment Centre	N/A	boxscore
13/01/2001	Sydney Kings	92–128	Victoria Titans	Sydney Super Dome	N/A	boxscore

=== Round 14 ===
Date	Home	Score	Away	Venue	Crowd	Boxscore
17/01/2001	Victoria Titans	119–96	Brisbane Bullets	Ballarat Stadium	N/A	boxscore
19/01/2001	Wollongong Hawks	130–99	Melbourne Tigers	WIN Entertainment Centre	5,390	boxscore
19/01/2001	Townsville Crocodiles	109–105	Sydney Kings	Townsville Entertainment Centre	N/A	boxscore
20/01/2001	Cairns Taipans	91–94	Townsville Crocodiles	Cairns Convention Centre	N/A	boxscore
20/01/2001	Perth Wildcats	107–100	Victoria Titans	Perth Entertainment Centre	N/A	boxscore
20/01/2001	West Sydney Razorbacks	107–101	Adelaide 36ers	State Sports Centre	N/A	boxscore

=== Round 15 ===
Date	Home	Score	Away	Venue	Crowd	Boxscore
23/01/2001	Melbourne Tigers	125–96	Townsville Crocodiles	Bendigo Stadium	N/A	boxscore
25/01/2001	Cairns Taipans	86–115	Adelaide 36ers	Cairns Convention Centre	N/A	boxscore
26/01/2001	Sydney Kings	108–88	Perth Wildcats	Sydney Super Dome	N/A	boxscore
26/01/2001	Canberra Cannons	85–116	Victoria Titans	AIS Arena	N/A	boxscore
27/01/2001	Wollongong Hawks	79–92	Victoria Titans	WIN Entertainment Centre	5,050	boxscore
27/01/2001	Brisbane Bullets	88–106	Perth Wildcats	Brisbane Convention & Exhibition Centre	N/A	boxscore
27/01/2001	Townsville Crocodiles	111–94	Adelaide 36ers	Townsville Entertainment Centre	N/A	boxscore
27/01/2001	West Sydney Razorbacks	121–93	Melbourne Tigers	State Sports Centre	N/A	boxscore

=== Round 16 ===
Date	Home	Score	Away	Venue	Crowd	Boxscore
2/02/2001	Cairns Taipans	97–113	West Sydney Razorbacks	Cairns Convention Centre	N/A	boxscore
2/02/2001	Brisbane Bullets	104–109	Townsville Crocodiles	Brisbane Convention & Exhibition Centre	N/A	boxscore
3/02/2001	Melbourne Tigers	84–86	Victoria Titans	Hisense Arena	N/A	boxscore
3/02/2001	Adelaide 36ers	104–98	Wollongong Hawks	Adelaide Arena	7,575	boxscore
4/02/2001	Sydney Kings	116–93	Canberra Cannons	Sydney Super Dome	N/A	boxscore

=== Round 17 ===
Date	Home	Score	Away	Venue	Crowd	Boxscore
9/02/2001	Wollongong Hawks	96–93	Adelaide 36ers	WIN Entertainment Centre	4,319	boxscore
9/02/2001	West Sydney Razorbacks	97–81	Canberra Cannons	State Sports Centre	N/A	boxscore
10/02/2001	Adelaide 36ers	82–89	Victoria Titans	Adelaide Arena	N/A	boxscore
10/02/2001	Cairns Taipans	116–107	Perth Wildcats	Cairns Convention Centre	N/A	boxscore
10/02/2001	Sydney Kings	132–104	Wollongong Hawks	Sydney Super Dome	4,785	boxscore
10/02/2001	Townsville Crocodiles	112–92	Canberra Cannons	Townsville Entertainment Centre	N/A	boxscore
11/02/2001	Melbourne Tigers	117–103	Brisbane Bullets	Hisense Arena	N/A	boxscore

=== Round 18 ===
Date	Home	Score	Away	Venue	Crowd	Boxscore
16/02/2001	Victoria Titans	100–87	Perth Wildcats	Hisense Arena	N/A	boxscore
16/02/2001	West Sydney Razorbacks	84–112	Wollongong Hawks	State Sports Centre	N/A	boxscore
17/02/2001	Canberra Cannons	84–100	Victoria Titans	AIS Arena	N/A	boxscore
17/02/2001	Sydney Kings	112–106	Brisbane Bullets	Sydney Super Dome	N/A	boxscore
17/02/2001	Townsville Crocodiles	107–98	Cairns Taipans	Townsville Entertainment Centre	N/A	boxscore
18/02/2001	Melbourne Tigers	117–120	Wollongong Hawks	Geelong Arena	N/A	boxscore

=== Round 19 ===
Date	Home	Score	Away	Venue	Crowd	Boxscore
21/02/2001	Melbourne Tigers	99–90	Cairns Taipans	Hisense Arena	N/A	boxscore
23/02/2001	Cairns Taipans	109–92	Canberra Cannons	Cairns Convention Centre	N/A	boxscore
24/02/2001	Adelaide 36ers	99–92	Victoria Titans	Adelaide Arena	N/A	boxscore
24/02/2001	Brisbane Bullets	114–80	Canberra Cannons	Brisbane Convention & Exhibition Centre	N/A	boxscore
24/02/2001	Perth Wildcats	104–106	Wollongong Hawks	Perth Entertainment Centre	7,153	boxscore
24/02/2001	West Sydney Razorbacks	90–99	Sydney Kings	State Sports Centre	N/A	boxscore
25/02/2001	Melbourne Tigers	96–102	Townsville Crocodiles	Hisense Arena	N/A	boxscore

=== Round 20 ===
Date	Home	Score	Away	Venue	Crowd	Boxscore
2/03/2001	Victoria Titans	96–115	Sydney Kings	Hisense Arena	N/A	boxscore
2/03/2001	West Sydney Razorbacks	103–122	Wollongong Hawks	State Sports Centre	2,412	boxscore
3/03/2001	Adelaide 36ers	85–91	Townsville Crocodiles	Adelaide Arena	N/A	boxscore
3/03/2001	Brisbane Bullets	110–115	Perth Wildcats	Brisbane Convention & Exhibition Centre	N/A	boxscore
3/03/2001	Canberra Cannons	74–89	Cairns Taipans	AIS Arena	N/A	boxscore
3/03/2001	Sydney Kings	100–97	Melbourne Tigers	Sydney Super Dome	N/A	boxscore

=== Round 21 ===
Date	Home	Score	Away	Venue	Crowd	Boxscore
9/03/2001	Cairns Taipans	113–118	Sydney Kings	Cairns Convention Centre	N/A	boxscore
10/03/2001	Brisbane Bullets	75–92	West Sydney Razorbacks	Brisbane Convention & Exhibition Centre	N/A	boxscore
10/03/2001	Perth Wildcats	120–85	Adelaide 36ers	Perth Entertainment Centre	N/A	boxscore
10/03/2001	Sydney Kings	86–119	Wollongong Hawks	Sydney Super Dome	6,940	boxscore
10/03/2001	Townsville Crocodiles	122–88	Canberra Cannons	Townsville Entertainment Centre	N/A	boxscore
10/03/2001	Victoria Titans	133–124	Melbourne Tigers	Hisense Arena	N/A	boxscore
12/03/2001	Melbourne Tigers	106–108	Perth Wildcats	Hisense Arena	N/A	boxscore

=== Round 22 ===
Date	Home	Score	Away	Venue	Crowd	Boxscore
16/03/2001	Townsville Crocodiles	126–63	Brisbane Bullets	Townsville Entertainment Centre	N/A	boxscore
17/03/2001	Cairns Taipans	90–86	Brisbane Bullets	Cairns Convention Centre	N/A	boxscore
17/03/2001	Adelaide 36ers	109–112	Melbourne Tigers	Adelaide Arena	N/A	boxscore
17/03/2001	West Sydney Razorbacks	101–122	Sydney Kings	State Sports Centre	N/A	boxscore
17/03/2001	Wollongong Hawks	121–86	Canberra Cannons	WIN Entertainment Centre	N/A	boxscore

=== Round 23 ===
Date	Home	Score	Away	Venue	Crowd	Boxscore
23/03/2001	Perth Wildcats	110–75	West Sydney Razorbacks	Perth Entertainment Centre	N/A	boxscore
23/03/2001	Sydney Kings	123–126	Townsville Crocodiles	Sydney Super Dome	N/A	boxscore
24/03/2001	Victoria Titans	121–72	Cairns Taipans	Hisense Arena	N/A	boxscore
24/03/2001	Wollongong Hawks	88–93	Townsville Crocodiles	WIN Entertainment Centre	5,676	boxscore
25/03/2001	Canberra Cannons	100–107	West Sydney Razorbacks	AIS Arena	N/A	boxscore

=== Round 24 ===
Date	Home	Score	Away	Venue	Crowd	Boxscore
29/03/2001	Melbourne Tigers	125–101	West Sydney Razorbacks	Hisense Arena	N/A	boxscore
30/03/2001	Canberra Cannons	83–93	Perth Wildcats	AIS Arena	N/A	boxscore
30/03/2001	Townsville Crocodiles	138–107	Sydney Kings	Townsville Entertainment Centre	N/A	boxscore
31/03/2001	Brisbane Bullets	94–103	Melbourne Tigers	Brisbane Convention & Exhibition Centre	N/A	boxscore
31/03/2001	Cairns Taipans	101–104	Wollongong Hawks	Cairns Convention Centre	5,300	boxscore
31/03/2001	Sydney Kings	146–97	Canberra Cannons	Sydney Super Dome	N/A	boxscore
31/03/2001	Victoria Titans	113–98	Adelaide 36ers	Hisense Arena	N/A	boxscore

== Ladder ==
Pos	2000–01 NBL season											
Pos	Team	Pld	W	L	PCT	Last 5	Streak	Home	Away	PF	PA	PP
1	Victoria Titans^{1}	28	22	6	78.57%	3–2	W3	12–3	10–3	2962	2613	113.36%
2	Townsville Crocodiles^{1}	28	22	6	78.57%	5–0	W11	12–2	10–4	3039	2783	109.20%
3	Perth Wildcats^{2}	28	21	7	75.00%	5–0	W5	11–2	10–5	2968	2738	108.40%
4	Wollongong Hawks^{2}	28	21	7	75.00%	4–1	W1	9–5	12–2	2962	2801	105.75%
5	Sydney Kings	28	17	11	60.71%	2–3	W1	11–3	6–8	3008	2919	103.05%
6	Adelaide 36ers	28	16	12	57.14%	1–4	L4	10–4	6–8	2874	2701	106.41%
7	Melbourne Tigers	28	13	15	46.43%	3–2	W3	7–8	6–7	3052	3067	99.51%
8	West Sydney Razorbacks	28	9	19	32.14%	2–3	L1	4–10	5–9	2791	2942	94.87%
9	Cairns Taipans	28	6	22	21.43%	2–3	L2	4–10	2–12	2604	2861	91.02%
10	Brisbane Bullets	28	4	24	14.29%	0–5	L5	4–9	0–15	2554	2870	88.99%
11	Canberra Cannons	28	3	25	10.71%	0–5	L14	3–11	0–14	2507	3026	82.85%

Updated to match(es) played on 31 March 2001. Source: NBL.com.au

^{1}Victoria Titans won Head-to-Head (2-0).

^{2}Head-to-Head between Perth Wildcats and Wollongong Hawks (1-1). Perth Wildcats won For and Against (+3).

== Finals ==
=== Playoff bracket ===
Qualifying Finals
1	Victoria Titans	101	83	103
6	Adelaide 36ers	96	96	115
2	Townsville Crocodiles	109	121	122
5	Sydney Kings	127	113	114
3	Perth Wildcats	90	106	88
4	Wollongong Hawks	97	95	98

Semifinals
2	Townsville Crocodiles	97	98	101
1	Victoria Titans	106	82	97
4	Wollongong Hawks	84	100	109
6	Adelaide 36ers	83	111	108

Grand Final
2	Townsville Crocodiles	101	114	94
4	Wollongong Hawks	104	97	97

=== Qualifying Finals ===
Date	Home	Score	Away	Venue	Crowd	Boxscore
4/04/2001	Sydney Kings	127–109	Townsville Crocodiles	Sydney Super Dome	N/A	boxscore
4/04/2001	Wollongong Hawks	97–90	Perth Wildcats	WIN Entertainment Centre	4,261	boxscore
5/04/2001	Adelaide 36ers	96–101	Victoria Titans	Adelaide Arena	N/A	boxscore
6/04/2001	Townsville Crocodiles	121–113	Sydney Kings	Townsville Entertainment Centre	N/A	boxscore
7/04/2001	Victoria Titans	83–96	Adelaide 36ers	Hisense Arena	N/A	boxscore
7/04/2001	Perth Wildcats	106–95	Wollongong Hawks	Perth Entertainment Centre	N/A	boxscore
8/04/2001	Townsville Crocodiles	122–114	Sydney Kings	Townsville Entertainment Centre	N/A	boxscore
9/04/2001	Victoria Titans	103–115	Adelaide 36ers	Hisense Arena	N/A	boxscore
10/04/2001	Perth Wildcats	88–98	Wollongong Hawks	Perth Entertainment Centre	5,502	boxscore

=== Semi-finals ===
Date	Home	Score	Away	Venue	Crowd	Boxscore
12/04/2001	Adelaide 36ers	83–84	Wollongong Hawks	Adelaide Arena	N/A	boxscore
13/04/2001	Victoria Titans	106–97	Townsville Crocodiles	Hisense Arena	N/A	boxscore
14/04/2001	Wollongong Hawks	100–111	Adelaide 36ers	WIN Entertainment Centre	5,706	boxscore
15/04/2001	Townsville Crocodiles	98–82	Victoria Titans	Townsville Entertainment Centre	N/A	boxscore
16/04/2001	Wollongong Hawks	109–108	Adelaide 36ers	WIN Entertainment Centre	4,512	boxscore
17/04/2001	Townsville Crocodiles	101–97	Victoria Titans	Townsville Entertainment Centre	N/A	boxscore

=== Grand Final ===
Date	Home	Score	Away	Venue	Crowd	Boxscore
22/04/2001	Wollongong Hawks	104–101	Townsville Crocodiles	WIN Entertainment Centre	5,837	boxscore
28/04/2001	Townsville Crocodiles	114–97	Wollongong Hawks	Townsville Entertainment Centre	5,257	boxscore
29/04/2001	Townsville Crocodiles	94–97	Wollongong Hawks	Townsville Entertainment Centre	5,257	boxscore

== 2000–01 NBL statistics leaders ==
Category	Player	Team	Stat
Points per game	Andrew Gaze	Melbourne Tigers	29.1
Rebounds per game	Mark Bradtke	Melbourne Tigers	14.1
Assists per game	Darryl McDonald	Victoria Titans	7.9
Steals per game	Darryl McDonald	Victoria Titans	2.7
Blocks per game	Simon Dwight	West Sydney Razorbacks	3.1
Free throw percentage	Andrew Gaze	Melbourne Tigers	91.4%
Three-point field goal percentage	Jason Smith	Victoria Titans	47.4%

== NBL awards ==
- Most Valuable Player: Robert Rose, Townsville Crocodiles
- Rookie of the Year: Axel Dench, Wollongong Hawks
- Best Defensive Player: Darnell Mee, Adelaide 36ers
- Best Sixth Man: Chris Anstey Victoria Titans
- Most Improved Player: James Harvey, Perth Wildcats
- Coach of the Year: Brendan Joyce, Wollongong Hawks

== All NBL Team ==
#	Player	Team
PG	Ricky Grace	Perth Wildcats
SG	Robert Rose	Townsville Crocodiles
SF	Jason Smith	Victoria Titans
PF	Darnell Mee	Adelaide 36ers
C	Mark Bradtke	Melbourne Tigers
