= Victoria Titans =

Defunct NBL club based in Melbourne

- Leagues: NBL
- Founded: 1998
- Dissolved: 2004
- History: Victoria Titans; 1998–2002; Victoria Giants; 2002–2004
- Arena: Melbourne Park (1998–2000); Vodafone Arena (2000–2002); MSAC (2002–2004)
- Capacity: MP – 15,000; VA – 10,500; MSAC – 2,000
- Location: Melbourne, Victoria
- Team colors: Titans – Black, teal, white Giants – Carolina blue, orange, white, black
- Main sponsor: Liberty
- Championships: 0
- Website: www.giants.com.au
| Home | Away |

The Victoria Titans (known in its final two seasons as the Victoria Giants) were an Australian professional basketball team that competed in the National Basketball League (NBL). The club was based in Melbourne, Victoria.

== History ==
The Titans were founded as a merger between the South East Melbourne Magic and North Melbourne Giants and competed in the National Basketball League (NBL) between the 1998–99 season and the 2003–04 season, and played their home games at Melbourne Park (1998–2000) and Vodafone Arena (2000–2002) when branded as the Titans. As the Giants the team played their games at the Melbourne Sports and Aquatic Centre (2002–2004).

Under the Titans name, the team competed in back-to-back NBL Grand Finals in 1999 and 2000, losing to the Adelaide 36ers and Perth Wildcats respectively. After the Titans folded in mid-2002, a group fronted by businessman Peter Fiddes was granted a licence in their place and called the new team the Giants. The club struggled financially for one season before being propped up by Gerry Ryan for the 2003–04 season. Ryan and co-owner Sandy Constantine pulled the team out of the league in 2004, but retained the licence despite the NBL's attempts to take it back.

== Season by season ==
| NBL champions | League champions | Runners-up | Finals berth |

| Season | Tier | League | Regular season | | | | | Post-season | Head coach | Captain | Club MVP |
| Season | Tier | League | Finish | Played | Wins | Losses | Win % | Post-season | Head coach | Captain | Club MVP |
|---|---|---|---|---|---|---|---|---|---|---|---|
Victoria Titans
| 1998–99 | 1 | NBL | 4th | 26 | 16 | 10 | .615 | Won qualifying finals (Wollongong) 2–0; Won semifinals (Melbourne) 2–0; Lost NBL finals (Adelaide) 1–2 | Brian Goorjian | Tony Ronaldson | Tony Ronaldson |
| 1999–2000 | 1 | NBL | 4th | 28 | 20 | 8 | .714 | Won elimination finals (Melbourne 2–1; Won semifinals (Adelaide) 2–1; Lost NBL finals (Perth) 0–2 | Brian Goorjian | Tony Ronaldson | Jason Smith |
| 2000–01 | 1 | NBL | 1st | 28 | 22 | 6 | .786 | Lost qualifying finals (Adelaide) 1–2; Lost semifinals (Townsville) 1–2 | Brian Goorjian | Tony Ronaldson | Chris Anstey |
| 2001–02 | 1 | NBL | 1st | 30 | 21 | 9 | .700 | Lost qualifying finals (Melbourne) 1–2; Lost semifinals (Adelaide) 1–2 | Brian Goorjian | Tony Ronaldson | Chris Anstey |
Victoria Giants
| 2002–03 | 1 | NBL | 10th | 30 | 9 | 21 | .300 | Did not qualify | Mark Wright | Darryl McDonald | Jamahl Mosley |
| 2003–04 | 1 | NBL | 11th | 33 | 11 | 22 | .333 | Did not qualify | Mark Wright | Rob Feaster | Ben Pepper |
| Regular season record | | | | 175 | 99 | 76 | .566 | 2 regular season champions | | | |
| Finals record | | | | 27 | 13 | 14 | .481 | 0 NBL championships | | | |

As of the end of the 2003–04 season

Source: Victoria Giants Year by Year

== Honour roll ==
The logo used by the Victoria Giants from 2002 to 2004.

| NBL Championships: | None |
| NBL Regular Season Champions: | 2 (2001, 2002) |
| NBL finals appearances: | 4 (1999, 2000, 2001, 2002) |
| NBL Grand Final appearances: | 2 (1999, 2000) |
| NBL Most Valuable Player: | None |
| NBL Grand Final MVP: | None |
| All-NBL First Team: | Jason Smith (2001), Chris Anstey (2002) |
| All-NBL Second Team: | Jason Smith (2000), Chris Anstey (2001) |
| All-NBL Third Team: | Darryl McDonald (2000, 2001, 2002), Tony Ronaldson (2002) |
| NBL Coach of the Year: | Brian Goorjian (2002) |
| NBL Rookie of the Year: | None |
| NBL Most Improved Player: | None |
| NBL Best Defensive Player: | None |
| NBL Best Sixth Man: | Chris Anstey (2001), Jamahl Mosley (2002) |
