= 2001–02 NBL season =

Professional basketball season

- League: National Basketball League
- Season: 2001–02
- Dates: 11 October 2001 – 19 April 2002
- Teams: 11
- TV partner: Australia: Fox Sports

Regular season
- Season champions: Victoria Titans
- Season MVP: (Australia) Mark Bradtke (Melbourne)

Finals
- Champions: Adelaide 36ers (4th title)
- Runners-up: West Sydney Razorbacks
- Semifinalists: Victoria Titans; Melbourne Tigers
- Finals MVP: (Australia) Brett Maher (Adelaide)

Statistical leaders
Points	(United States) Randy Rutherford (Brisbane)	25.0
Rebounds	(Australia) Mark Bradtke (Melbourne)	13.1
Assists	(Australia) Shane Heal (Sydney)	7.5

NBL seasons
- ← 2000–01 2002–03 →

The 2001–02 NBL season was the 24th season of competition since its establishment in 1979. A total of 11 teams contested the league, The free-to-air television network ABC did not return this season only showing on Fox Sports on Foxtel.

== Regular season ==
The 2001–02 regular season took place over 24 rounds between 11 October 2001 and 23 March 2002.

=== Round 1 ===
Date	Home	Score	Away	Venue	Crowd	Boxscore
11/10/2001	Sydney Kings	117–99	West Sydney Razorbacks	Sydney Super Dome	N/A	boxscore
12/10/2001	Wollongong Hawks	108–97	Canberra Cannons	WIN Entertainment Centre	N/A	boxscore
13/10/2001	Canberra Cannons	87–75	Brisbane Bullets	AIS Arena	N/A	boxscore
13/10/2001	Townsville Crocodiles	100–92	Cairns Taipans	Townsville Entertainment Centre	N/A	boxscore
13/10/2001	Adelaide 36ers	94–77	Perth Wildcats	Adelaide Arena	N/A	boxscore
13/10/2001	Melbourne Tigers	109–103	Victoria Titans	Hisense Arena	N/A	boxscore
14/10/2001	West Sydney Razorbacks	107–81	Wollongong Hawks	State Sports Centre	N/A	boxscore

=== Round 2 ===
Date	Home	Score	Away	Venue	Crowd	Boxscore
19/10/2001	Brisbane Bullets	91–98	Melbourne Tigers	Brisbane Convention & Exhibition Centre	N/A	boxscore
19/10/2001	Canberra Cannons	81–80	Perth Wildcats	AIS Arena	N/A	boxscore
19/10/2001	Townsville Crocodiles	105–111	Adelaide 36ers	Townsville Entertainment Centre	N/A	boxscore
20/10/2001	Victoria Titans	103–85	Perth Wildcats	Hisense Arena	N/A	boxscore
20/10/2001	Wollongong Hawks	106–119	Sydney Kings	WIN Entertainment Centre	N/A	boxscore
20/10/2001	Cairns Taipans	97–79	Adelaide 36ers	Cairns Convention Centre	N/A	boxscore
21/10/2001	West Sydney Razorbacks	110–89	Melbourne Tigers	State Sports Centre	N/A	boxscore

=== Round 3 ===
Date	Home	Score	Away	Venue	Crowd	Boxscore
26/10/2001	Brisbane Bullets	78–81	Perth Wildcats	Brisbane Convention & Exhibition Centre	N/A	boxscore
26/10/2001	Canberra Cannons	108–98	Sydney Kings	AIS Arena	N/A	boxscore
26/10/2001	Cairns Taipans	91–74	Victoria Titans	Cairns Convention Centre	N/A	boxscore
27/10/2001	West Sydney Razorbacks	119–98	Perth Wildcats	State Sports Centre	N/A	boxscore
27/10/2001	Melbourne Tigers	122–95	Canberra Cannons	Hisense Arena	N/A	boxscore
27/10/2001	Townsville Crocodiles	91–94	Victoria Titans	Townsville Entertainment Centre	N/A	boxscore
27/10/2001	Adelaide 36ers	102–93	Wollongong Hawks	Adelaide Arena	N/A	boxscore
27/10/2001	Sydney Kings	122–95	Brisbane Bullets	Sydney Super Dome	N/A	boxscore

=== Round 4 ===
Date	Home	Score	Away	Venue	Crowd	Boxscore
1/11/2001	Canberra Cannons	83–112	Victoria Titans	AIS Arena	N/A	boxscore
2/11/2001	Sydney Kings	138–88	Cairns Taipans	Sydney Super Dome	N/A	boxscore
2/11/2001	Adelaide 36ers	127–97	Townsville Crocodiles	Adelaide Arena	N/A	boxscore
3/11/2001	Perth Wildcats	82–99	Townsville Crocodiles	Perth Entertainment Centre	N/A	boxscore
3/11/2001	Victoria Titans	93–102	Wollongong Hawks	Hisense Arena	N/A	boxscore
3/11/2001	Brisbane Bullets	108–104	West Sydney Razorbacks	Brisbane Convention & Exhibition Centre	N/A	boxscore
4/11/2001	Melbourne Tigers	115–121	Sydney Kings	Hisense Arena	N/A	boxscore

=== Round 5 ===
Date	Home	Score	Away	Venue	Crowd	Boxscore
9/11/2001	Victoria Titans	91–98	Cairns Taipans	Hisense Arena	N/A	boxscore
10/11/2001	Townsville Crocodiles	112–125	Brisbane Bullets	Townsville Entertainment Centre	N/A	boxscore
10/11/2001	West Sydney Razorbacks	130–80	Cairns Taipans	State Sports Centre	N/A	boxscore
10/11/2001	Melbourne Tigers	102–98	Perth Wildcats	Hisense Arena	N/A	boxscore
10/11/2001	Adelaide 36ers	112–104	Sydney Kings	Adelaide Arena	N/A	boxscore
10/11/2001	Canberra Cannons	98–76	Wollongong Hawks	AIS Arena	N/A	boxscore

=== Round 6 ===
Date	Home	Score	Away	Venue	Crowd	Boxscore
16/11/2001	West Sydney Razorbacks	98–114	Brisbane Bullets	State Sports Centre	N/A	boxscore
16/11/2001	Wollongong Hawks	91–96	Adelaide 36ers	WIN Entertainment Centre	N/A	boxscore
17/11/2001	Victoria Titans	86–84	Adelaide 36ers	Hisense Arena	N/A	boxscore
18/11/2001	Melbourne Tigers	85–105	Brisbane Bullets	Hisense Arena	N/A	boxscore
18/11/2001	Cairns Taipans	84–91	Wollongong Hawks	Cairns Convention Centre	N/A	boxscore

=== Round 7 ===
Date	Home	Score	Away	Venue	Crowd	Boxscore
20/11/2001	Townsville Crocodiles	122–112	Victoria Titans	Townsville Entertainment Centre	N/A	boxscore
20/11/2001	Sydney Kings	114–96	Perth Wildcats	Sydney Super Dome	N/A	boxscore
23/11/2001	Wollongong Hawks	97–90	Brisbane Bullets	WIN Entertainment Centre	N/A	boxscore
23/11/2001	Adelaide 36ers	95–98	Melbourne Tigers	Adelaide Arena	N/A	boxscore
23/11/2001	Canberra Cannons	97–105	Sydney Kings	AIS Arena	N/A	boxscore
23/11/2001	Cairns Taipans	90–100	West Sydney Razorbacks	Cairns Convention Centre	N/A	boxscore
24/11/2001	Townsville Crocodiles	97–94	West Sydney Razorbacks	Townsville Entertainment Centre	N/A	boxscore
24/11/2001	Perth Wildcats	106–99	Melbourne Tigers	Perth Entertainment Centre	N/A	boxscore

=== Round 8 ===
Date	Home	Score	Away	Venue	Crowd	Boxscore
28/11/2001	Perth Wildcats	88–83	Victoria Titans	Perth Entertainment Centre	N/A	boxscore
29/11/2001	Cairns Taipans	80–90	Melbourne Tigers	Cairns Convention Centre	N/A	boxscore
30/11/2001	Canberra Cannons	109–106	Townsville Crocodiles	AIS Arena	N/A	boxscore
30/11/2001	Wollongong Hawks	98–90	West Sydney Razorbacks	WIN Entertainment Centre	N/A	boxscore
1/12/2001	Sydney Kings	129–110	Cairns Taipans	Sydney Super Dome	N/A	boxscore
1/12/2001	Brisbane Bullets	101–112	Townsville Crocodiles	Brisbane Convention & Exhibition Centre	N/A	boxscore
1/12/2001	Adelaide 36ers	91–111	Victoria Titans	Adelaide Arena	N/A	boxscore
2/12/2001	Melbourne Tigers	92–95	Wollongong Hawks	Hisense Arena	N/A	boxscore
2/12/2001	West Sydney Razorbacks	106–99	Perth Wildcats	State Sports Centre	N/A	boxscore
3/12/2001	Victoria Titans	119–107	Brisbane Bullets	Hisense Arena	N/A	boxscore

=== Round 9 ===
Date	Home	Score	Away	Venue	Crowd	Boxscore
7/12/2001	Brisbane Bullets	99–96	Canberra Cannons	Brisbane Convention & Exhibition Centre	N/A	boxscore
8/12/2001	Adelaide 36ers	109–95	Sydney Kings	Adelaide Arena	N/A	boxscore
8/12/2001	Wollongong Hawks	120–105	Townsville Crocodiles	WIN Entertainment Centre	N/A	boxscore
8/12/2001	West Sydney Razorbacks	81–79	Victoria Titans	State Sports Centre	N/A	boxscore

=== Round 10 ===
Date	Home	Score	Away	Venue	Crowd	Boxscore
14/12/2001	Victoria Titans	99–86	West Sydney Razorbacks	Hisense Arena	N/A	boxscore
15/12/2001	Townsville Crocodiles	132–102	Canberra Cannons	Townsville Entertainment Centre	N/A	boxscore
15/12/2001	Melbourne Tigers	104–85	West Sydney Razorbacks	Hisense Arena	N/A	boxscore
15/12/2001	Perth Wildcats	116–93	Adelaide 36ers	Perth Entertainment Centre	N/A	boxscore
15/12/2001	Wollongong Hawks	101–96	Brisbane Bullets	Shoalhaven Stadium	N/A	boxscore

=== Round 11 ===
Date	Home	Score	Away	Venue	Crowd	Boxscore
18/12/2001	Brisbane Bullets	98–104	Wollongong Hawks	Brisbane Entertainment Centre	N/A	boxscore
21/12/2001	Sydney Kings	111–100	Townsville Crocodiles	Sydney Super Dome	N/A	boxscore
22/12/2001	West Sydney Razorbacks	117–85	Adelaide 36ers	State Sports Centre	N/A	boxscore
22/12/2001	Cairns Taipans	85–97	Brisbane Bullets	Cairns Convention Centre	N/A	boxscore
22/12/2001	Victoria Titans	118–93	Perth Wildcats	Hisense Arena	N/A	boxscore
22/12/2001	Canberra Cannons	70–80	Wollongong Hawks	AIS Arena	N/A	boxscore
23/12/2001	Melbourne Tigers	107–99	Townsville Crocodiles	Hisense Arena	N/A	boxscore

=== Round 12 ===
Date	Home	Score	Away	Venue	Crowd	Boxscore
26/12/2001	Victoria Titans	100–89	Sydney Kings	Hisense Arena	N/A	boxscore
28/12/2001	Perth Wildcats	95–102	Brisbane Bullets	Perth Entertainment Centre	N/A	boxscore
28/12/2001	Cairns Taipans	90–105	Townsville Crocodiles	Cairns Convention Centre	N/A	boxscore
29/12/2001	Wollongong Hawks	122–112	Sydney Kings	WIN Entertainment Centre	N/A	boxscore
31/12/2001	Adelaide 36ers	128–99	Canberra Cannons	Adelaide Arena	N/A	boxscore
31/12/2001	Townsville Crocodiles	95–98	Wollongong Hawks	Townsville Entertainment Centre	N/A	boxscore

=== Round 13 ===
Date	Home	Score	Away	Venue	Crowd	Boxscore
1/01/2002	Victoria Titans	104–93	West Sydney Razorbacks	Hisense Arena	N/A	boxscore
4/01/2002	Cairns Taipans	101–105	Adelaide 36ers	Cairns Convention Centre	N/A	boxscore
5/01/2002	Sydney Kings	105–130	Melbourne Tigers	Sydney Super Dome	N/A	boxscore
5/01/2002	Canberra Cannons	112–105	Townsville Crocodiles	AIS Arena	N/A	boxscore
5/01/2002	Perth Wildcats	93–87	Wollongong Hawks	Perth Entertainment Centre	N/A	boxscore
5/01/2002	Brisbane Bullets	110–96	Adelaide 36ers	Brisbane Convention & Exhibition Centre	N/A	boxscore
6/01/2002	West Sydney Razorbacks	98–93	Cairns Taipans	State Sports Centre	N/A	boxscore

=== Round 14 ===
Date	Home	Score	Away	Venue	Crowd	Boxscore
9/01/2002	Cairns Taipans	98–73	Canberra Cannons	Cairns Convention Centre	N/A	boxscore
11/01/2002	Brisbane Bullets	84–90	Cairns Taipans	Brisbane Convention & Exhibition Centre	N/A	boxscore
11/01/2002	Canberra Cannons	97–98	Melbourne Tigers	AIS Arena	N/A	boxscore
11/01/2002	Adelaide 36ers	98–95	West Sydney Razorbacks	Adelaide Arena	N/A	boxscore
12/01/2002	Townsville Crocodiles	108–88	Brisbane Bullets	Townsville Entertainment Centre	N/A	boxscore
12/01/2002	Wollongong Hawks	89–102	Melbourne Tigers	WIN Entertainment Centre	N/A	boxscore
12/01/2002	Sydney Kings	80–101	Victoria Titans	Sydney Super Dome	N/A	boxscore
12/01/2002	Perth Wildcats	118–95	West Sydney Razorbacks	Perth Entertainment Centre	N/A	boxscore

=== Round 15 ===
Date	Home	Score	Away	Venue	Crowd	Boxscore
16/01/2002	Victoria Titans	102–89	Canberra Cannons	Ballarat Stadium	N/A	boxscore
18/01/2002	West Sydney Razorbacks	97–92	Canberra Cannons	State Sports Centre	N/A	boxscore
18/01/2002	Townsville Crocodiles	100–98	Melbourne Tigers	Townsville Entertainment Centre	N/A	boxscore
19/01/2002	Sydney Kings	109–98	Adelaide 36ers	Sydney Super Dome	N/A	boxscore
19/01/2002	Wollongong Hawks	101–96	West Sydney Razorbacks	WIN Entertainment Centre	N/A	boxscore
19/01/2002	Perth Wildcats	103–73	Cairns Taipans	Perth Entertainment Centre	N/A	boxscore
19/01/2002	Brisbane Bullets	100–90	Melbourne Tigers	Brisbane Convention & Exhibition Centre	N/A	boxscore

=== Round 16 ===
Date	Home	Score	Away	Venue	Crowd	Boxscore
22/01/2002	Perth Wildcats	89–86	Cairns Taipans	Bunbury Stadium	N/A	boxscore
25/01/2002	Townsville Crocodiles	123–108	Sydney Kings	Townsville Entertainment Centre	N/A	boxscore
25/01/2002	Wollongong Hawks	93–80	Perth Wildcats	WIN Entertainment Centre	N/A	boxscore
26/01/2002	Adelaide 36ers	126–105	Brisbane Bullets	Adelaide Arena	N/A	boxscore
26/01/2002	Canberra Cannons	85–81	Melbourne Tigers	AIS Arena	N/A	boxscore
26/01/2002	Cairns Taipans	84–96	Sydney Kings	Cairns Convention Centre	N/A	boxscore

=== Round 17 ===
Date	Home	Score	Away	Venue	Crowd	Boxscore
31/01/2002	Perth Wildcats	108–102	Melbourne Tigers	Perth Entertainment Centre	N/A	boxscore
1/02/2002	West Sydney Razorbacks	123–107	Townsville Crocodiles	State Sports Centre	N/A	boxscore
1/02/2002	Brisbane Bullets	84–93	Victoria Titans	Brisbane Convention & Exhibition Centre	N/A	boxscore
1/02/2002	Sydney Kings	78–100	Wollongong Hawks	Sydney Super Dome	N/A	boxscore
2/02/2002	Melbourne Tigers	114–111	Townsville Crocodiles	Hisense Arena	N/A	boxscore
2/02/2002	Cairns Taipans	86–96	Victoria Titans	Cairns Convention Centre	N/A	boxscore
2/02/2002	Canberra Cannons	91–95	Adelaide 36ers	AIS Arena	N/A	boxscore
3/02/2002	Perth Wildcats	112–105	Sydney Kings	Perth Entertainment Centre	N/A	boxscore

=== Round 18 ===
Date	Home	Score	Away	Venue	Crowd	Boxscore
8/02/2002	Victoria Titans	123–98	Melbourne Tigers	Hisense Arena	N/A	boxscore
8/02/2002	Cairns Taipans	104–96	Townsville Crocodiles	Cairns Convention Centre	N/A	boxscore
8/02/2002	Adelaide 36ers	104–94	Wollongong Hawks	Adelaide Arena	N/A	boxscore
9/02/2002	Sydney Kings	95–124	West Sydney Razorbacks	Sydney Super Dome	N/A	boxscore
9/02/2002	Perth Wildcats	97–85	Canberra Cannons	Perth Entertainment Centre	N/A	boxscore
10/02/2002	Townsville Crocodiles	136–87	Wollongong Hawks	Townsville Entertainment Centre	N/A	boxscore
10/02/2002	Melbourne Tigers	111–114	Adelaide 36ers	Hisense Arena	N/A	boxscore

=== Round 19 ===
Date	Home	Score	Away	Venue	Crowd	Boxscore
13/02/2002	Adelaide 36ers	120–101	Brisbane Bullets	Adelaide Arena	N/A	boxscore
15/02/2002	Wollongong Hawks	80–85	Cairns Taipans	WIN Entertainment Centre	N/A	boxscore
15/02/2002	West Sydney Razorbacks	112–106	Townsville Crocodiles	State Sports Centre	N/A	boxscore
15/02/2002	Victoria Titans	121–103	Adelaide 36ers	Hisense Arena	N/A	boxscore
16/02/2002	Canberra Cannons	105–74	Cairns Taipans	AIS Arena	N/A	boxscore
16/02/2002	Perth Wildcats	109–96	Brisbane Bullets	Perth Entertainment Centre	N/A	boxscore
16/02/2002	Sydney Kings	102–110	Victoria Titans	Sydney Super Dome	N/A	boxscore
17/02/2002	Melbourne Tigers	96–108	West Sydney Razorbacks	Hisense Arena	N/A	boxscore

=== Round 20 ===
Date	Home	Score	Away	Venue	Crowd	Boxscore
22/02/2002	Townsville Crocodiles	118–110	Sydney Kings	Townsville Entertainment Centre	N/A	boxscore
22/02/2002	Canberra Cannons	102–98	West Sydney Razorbacks	AIS Arena	N/A	boxscore
23/02/2002	Cairns Taipans	94–100	Melbourne Tigers	Cairns Convention Centre	N/A	boxscore
23/02/2002	Adelaide 36ers	90–98	Perth Wildcats	Adelaide Arena	N/A	boxscore
23/02/2002	Brisbane Bullets	116–108	Sydney Kings	Brisbane Convention & Exhibition Centre	N/A	boxscore
23/02/2002	Wollongong Hawks	87–116	Victoria Titans	WIN Entertainment Centre	N/A	boxscore

=== Round 21 ===
Date	Home	Score	Away	Venue	Crowd	Boxscore
28/02/2002	Melbourne Tigers	99–112	Sydney Kings	Hisense Arena	N/A	boxscore
1/03/2002	Cairns Taipans	85–95	Perth Wildcats	Cairns Convention Centre	N/A	boxscore
1/03/2002	Victoria Titans	126–108	Canberra Cannons	Hisense Arena	N/A	boxscore
2/03/2002	Sydney Kings	106–93	Canberra Cannons	Sydney Super Dome	N/A	boxscore
2/03/2002	Adelaide 36ers	102–120	Melbourne Tigers	Adelaide Arena	N/A	boxscore
2/03/2002	Townsville Crocodiles	106–120	Perth Wildcats	Townsville Entertainment Centre	N/A	boxscore
2/03/2002	Brisbane Bullets	101–99	West Sydney Razorbacks	Brisbane Convention & Exhibition Centre	N/A	boxscore
3/03/2002	Wollongong Hawks	110–113	Cairns Taipans	WIN Entertainment Centre	N/A	boxscore

=== Round 22 ===
Date	Home	Score	Away	Venue	Crowd	Boxscore
8/03/2002	Sydney Kings	110–113	Brisbane Bullets	Sydney Super Dome	N/A	boxscore
8/03/2002	Cairns Taipans	103–80	Canberra Cannons	Cairns Convention Centre	N/A	boxscore
8/03/2002	Wollongong Hawks	106–114	Perth Wildcats	WIN Entertainment Centre	N/A	boxscore
9/03/2002	Brisbane Bullets	92–112	Canberra Cannons	Brisbane Convention & Exhibition Centre	N/A	boxscore
9/03/2002	Melbourne Tigers	127–121	Victoria Titans	Hisense Arena	N/A	boxscore
9/03/2002	Townsville Crocodiles	107–114	Adelaide 36ers	Townsville Entertainment Centre	N/A	boxscore
9/03/2002	West Sydney Razorbacks	128–122	Sydney Kings	State Sports Centre	N/A	boxscore

=== Round 23 ===
Date	Home	Score	Away	Venue	Crowd	Boxscore
14/03/2002	Melbourne Tigers	103–90	Cairns Taipans	Keilor Stadium	N/A	boxscore
15/03/2002	Victoria Titans	125–120	Townsville Crocodiles	Hisense Arena	N/A	boxscore
15/03/2002	Canberra Cannons	121–94	Adelaide 36ers	AIS Arena	N/A	boxscore
16/03/2002	Brisbane Bullets	111–81	Cairns Taipans	Brisbane Convention & Exhibition Centre	N/A	boxscore
16/03/2002	Sydney Kings	124–122	Perth Wildcats	Sydney Super Dome	N/A	boxscore
16/03/2002	West Sydney Razorbacks	113–88	Adelaide 36ers	State Sports Centre	N/A	boxscore

=== Round 24 ===
Date	Home	Score	Away	Venue	Crowd	Boxscore
20/03/2002	Perth Wildcats	98–94	Canberra Cannons	Perth Entertainment Centre	N/A	boxscore
22/03/2002	Victoria Titans	103–95	Wollongong Hawks	Hisense Arena	N/A	boxscore
23/03/2002	Brisbane Bullets	124–109	Victoria Titans	Brisbane Convention & Exhibition Centre	N/A	boxscore
23/03/2002	Adelaide 36ers	96–81	Cairns Taipans	Adelaide Arena	N/A	boxscore
23/03/2002	Perth Wildcats	97–105	Townsville Crocodiles	Perth Entertainment Centre	N/A	boxscore
23/03/2002	Melbourne Tigers	93–111	Wollongong Hawks	Hisense Arena	N/A	boxscore
23/03/2002	West Sydney Razorbacks	95–102	Canberra Cannons	State Sports Centre	N/A	boxscore

== Ladder ==
Pos	2001–02 NBL season											
Pos	Team	Pld	W	L	PCT	Last 5	Streak	Home	Away	PF	PA	PP
1	Victoria Titans	30	21	9	70.00%	3–2	L1	13–2	8–7	3127	2896	107.98%
2	Perth Wildcats^{1}	30	17	13	56.67%	3–2	L1	12–3	5–10	2947	2923	100.82%
3	Adelaide 36ers^{1}	30	17	13	56.67%	2–3	W1	11–4	6–9	3049	3064	99.51%
4	Wollongong Hawks^{2}	30	16	14	53.33%	1–4	W1	8–7	8–7	2903	2957	98.17%
5	West Sydney Razorbacks^{2}	30	16	14	53.33%	2–3	L1	13–2	3–12	3100	2963	105.03%
6	Melbourne Tigers^{2}	30	16	14	53.33%	3–2	L1	8–7	8–7	3072	3053	100.82%
7	Brisbane Bullets^{3}	30	14	16	46.67%	4–1	W2	8–7	6–9	3006	3047	98.65%
8	Sydney Kings^{3}	30	14	16	46.67%	3–2	W1	9–6	5–10	3244	3228	100.50%
9	Townsville Crocodiles	30	13	17	43.33%	2–3	W1	9–6	4–11	3225	3187	101.19%
10	Canberra Cannons	30	12	18	40.00%	3–2	W1	10–5	2–13	2863	2980	96.07%
11	Cairns Taipans	30	9	21	30.00%	2–3	L3	5–10	4–11	2706	2944	91.92%

Updated to match(es) played on 23 March 2002. Source: NBL.com.au

The NBL tie-breaker system as outlined in the NBL Rules and Regulations states that in the case of an identical win–loss record, the results in games played between the teams will determine order of seeding.

^{1}Perth Wildcats won Head-to-Head (2-1).

^{2}3-way Head-to-Head between Wollongong Hawks (4-2), West Sydney Razorbacks (3-3) and Melbourne Tigers (2-4).

^{3}Brisbane Bullets won Head-to-Head (2-1).

== Finals ==
=== Playoff bracket ===
Qualifying Finals
1	Victoria Titans	113	105	97
6	Melbourne Tigers	107	107	103
2	Perth Wildcats	85	98	X
5	West Sydney Razorbacks	106	109	X
3	Adelaide 36ers	107	101	X
4	Wollongong Hawks	90	95	X

Semifinals
3	Adelaide 36ers	99	81	103
1	Victoria Titans	92	86	92
5	West Sydney Razorbacks	93	125	115
6	Melbourne Tigers	114	109	103

Grand Final
3	Adelaide 36ers	106	100	125
5	West Sydney Razorbacks	97	103	107

=== Qualifying Finals ===
Date	Home	Score	Away	Venue	Crowd	Boxscore
27/03/2002	West Sydney Razorbacks	106–85	Perth Wildcats	State Sports Centre	N/A	boxscore
27/03/2002	Melbourne Tigers	107–113	Victoria Titans	Hisense Arena	N/A	boxscore
28/03/2002	Wollongong Hawks	90–107	Adelaide 36ers	WIN Entertainment Centre	N/A	boxscore
29/03/2002	Victoria Titans	105–107	Melbourne Tigers	Hisense Arena	N/A	boxscore
30/03/2002	Perth Wildcats	98–109	West Sydney Razorbacks	Perth Entertainment Centre	N/A	boxscore
31/03/2002	Adelaide 36ers	101–95	Wollongong Hawks	Adelaide Arena	N/A	boxscore
31/03/2002	Victoria Titans	97–103	Melbourne Tigers	Hisense Arena	N/A	boxscore

=== Semi-finals ===
Date	Home	Score	Away	Venue	Crowd	Boxscore
3/04/2002	Victoria Titans	92–99	Adelaide 36ers	Hisense Arena	N/A	boxscore
4/04/2002	Melbourne Tigers	114–93	West Sydney Razorbacks	Hisense Arena	N/A	boxscore
5/04/2002	Adelaide 36ers	81–86	Victoria Titans	Adelaide Arena	N/A	boxscore
6/04/2002	West Sydney Razorbacks	125–109	Melbourne Tigers	State Sports Centre	N/A	boxscore
7/04/2002	Adelaide 36ers	103–92	Victoria Titans	Adelaide Arena	N/A	boxscore
8/04/2002	West Sydney Razorbacks	115–103	Melbourne Tigers	State Sports Centre	N/A	boxscore

=== Grand Final ===
Date	Home	Score	Away	Venue	Crowd	Boxscore
12/04/2002	Adelaide 36ers	106–97	West Sydney Razorbacks	Adelaide Arena	7,800	boxscore
14/04/2002	West Sydney Razorbacks	103–100	Adelaide 36ers	State Sports Centre	4,500	boxscore
19/04/2002	Adelaide 36ers	125–107	West Sydney Razorbacks	Adelaide Arena	7,800	boxscore

== 2001–02 NBL statistics leaders ==
Category	Player	Team	Stat
Points per game	Willie Farley	Adelaide 36ers	25.5
Rebounds per game	Mark Bradtke	Melbourne Tigers	13.1
Assists per game	Shane Heal	Sydney Kings	7.5
Steals per game	Darryl McDonald	Victoria Titans	2.3
Blocks per game	Simon Dwight	West Sydney Razorbacks	3.7
Free throw percentage	Andrew Gaze	Melbourne Tigers	88.4%
Three-point field goal percentage	John Rillie	West Sydney Razorbacks	47.4%

== NBL awards ==
- Most Valuable Player: Mark Bradtke, Melbourne Tigers
- Rookie of the Year: Travis Lane, Sydney Kings
- Best Defensive Player: Simon Dwight, West Sydney Razorbacks
- Best Sixth Man: Jamahl Mosley, Victoria Titans
- Most Improved Player: Wade Helliwell, Brisbane Bullets
- Coach of the Year: Brian Goorjian, Victoria Titans

== All NBL Team ==
#	Player	Team
PG	Ricky Grace	Perth Wildcats
SG	Lanard Copeland	Melbourne Tigers
SF	Mark Bradtke	Melbourne Tigers
PF	Chris Anstey	Victoria Titans
C	Paul Rogers	Adelaide 36ers
