= 2002–03 NBL season =

Professional basketball season

- League: National Basketball League
- Season: 2002–03
- Dates: 2 October 2002 – 6 April 2003
- Teams: 11
- TV partner: Australia: Fox Sports

Regular season
- Season champions: Sydney Kings
- Season MVP: (United States) Chris Williams (Sydney)

Finals
- Champions: Sydney Kings (1st title)
- Runners-up: Perth Wildcats
- Semifinalists: Townsville Crocodiles; Wollongong Hawks
- Finals MVP: (United States) Chris Williams (Sydney)

Statistical leaders
Points	(Australia) John Rillie (West Sydney)	23.6
Rebounds	(Australia) Mark Bradtke (Melbourne)	12.9
Assists	(Australia) Ricky Grace (Perth)	8.0

NBL seasons
- ← 2001–02 2003–04 →

The 2002–03 NBL season was the 25th season of competition since its establishment in 1979. A total of 11 teams contested the league.

== Regular season ==
The 2002–03 regular season took place over 22 rounds between 2 October 2002 and 1 March 2003.

=== Round 1 ===
Date	Home	Score	Away	Venue	Crowd	Boxscore
2/10/2002	West Sydney Razorbacks	104–92	Adelaide 36ers	State Sports Centre	N/A	boxscore
2/10/2002	Canberra Cannons	94–88	Townsville Crocodiles	AIS Arena	N/A	boxscore
4/10/2002	Cairns Taipans	109–98	Brisbane Bullets	Cairns Convention Centre	N/A	boxscore
4/10/2002	Melbourne Tigers	105–111	Perth Wildcats	State Netball and Hockey Centre	N/A	boxscore
5/10/2002	Wollongong Hawks	116–104	Townsville Crocodiles	WIN Entertainment Centre	N/A	boxscore
6/10/2002	Perth Wildcats	95–85	Victoria Giants	Challenge Stadium	N/A	boxscore

=== Round 2 ===
Date	Home	Score	Away	Venue	Crowd	Boxscore
9/10/2002	Adelaide 36ers	93–110	Wollongong Hawks	Adelaide Arena	N/A	boxscore
9/10/2002	Canberra Cannons	90–77	Brisbane Bullets	AIS Arena	N/A	boxscore
11/10/2002	Townsville Crocodiles	88–96	Sydney Kings	Townsville Entertainment Centre	N/A	boxscore
11/10/2002	West Sydney Razorbacks	122–106	Brisbane Bullets	State Sports Centre	N/A	boxscore
12/10/2002	Cairns Taipans	88–110	Sydney Kings	Cairns Convention Centre	N/A	boxscore
12/10/2002	Victoria Giants	105–95	West Sydney Razorbacks	Hisense Arena	N/A	boxscore
12/10/2002	Wollongong Hawks	108–100	Perth Wildcats	WIN Entertainment Centre	N/A	boxscore

=== Round 3 ===
Date	Home	Score	Away	Venue	Crowd	Boxscore
16/10/2002	Victoria Giants	130–102	Melbourne Tigers	Hisense Arena	N/A	boxscore
16/10/2002	Perth Wildcats	106–101	Adelaide 36ers	Challenge Stadium	N/A	boxscore
18/10/2002	Sydney Kings	119–102	Wollongong Hawks	Sydney Entertainment Centre	N/A	boxscore
18/10/2002	Melbourne Tigers	103–92	Canberra Cannons	State Netball and Hockey Centre	N/A	boxscore
18/10/2002	Brisbane Bullets	92–101	Cairns Taipans	Brisbane Convention & Exhibition Centre	N/A	boxscore
19/10/2002	Adelaide 36ers	92–105	Canberra Cannons	Adelaide Arena	N/A	boxscore
19/10/2002	Townsville Crocodiles	108–117	Cairns Taipans	Townsville Entertainment Centre	N/A	boxscore
20/10/2002	West Sydney Razorbacks	94–122	Sydney Kings	State Sports Centre	N/A	boxscore

=== Round 4 ===
Date	Home	Score	Away	Venue	Crowd	Boxscore
23/10/2002	Perth Wildcats	90–87	Wollongong Hawks	Challenge Stadium	N/A	boxscore
23/10/2002	Sydney Kings	120–75	Townsville Crocodiles	Sydney Entertainment Centre	N/A	boxscore
25/10/2002	Townsville Crocodiles	96–93	Melbourne Tigers	Townsville Entertainment Centre	N/A	boxscore
26/10/2002	Canberra Cannons	117–91	West Sydney Razorbacks	AIS Arena	N/A	boxscore
26/10/2002	Victoria Giants	97–104	Wollongong Hawks	Hisense Arena	N/A	boxscore
26/10/2002	Brisbane Bullets	92–116	Adelaide 36ers	Brisbane Convention & Exhibition Centre	N/A	boxscore
27/10/2002	Cairns Taipans	92–103	Melbourne Tigers	Cairns Convention Centre	N/A	boxscore

=== Round 5 ===
Date	Home	Score	Away	Venue	Crowd	Boxscore
30/10/2002	Victoria Giants	135–129	Brisbane Bullets	Hisense Arena	N/A	boxscore
1/11/2002	West Sydney Razorbacks	97–103	Melbourne Tigers	State Sports Centre	N/A	boxscore
1/11/2002	Cairns Taipans	83–90	Wollongong Hawks	Cairns Convention Centre	N/A	boxscore
1/11/2002	Perth Wildcats	104–96	Townsville Crocodiles	Challenge Stadium	N/A	boxscore
2/11/2002	Sydney Kings	95–87	Melbourne Tigers	Sydney Entertainment Centre	N/A	boxscore
2/11/2002	Adelaide 36ers	115–111	Townsville Crocodiles	Adelaide Arena	N/A	boxscore

=== Round 6 ===
Date	Home	Score	Away	Venue	Crowd	Boxscore
6/11/2002	Adelaide 36ers	91–105	Sydney Kings	Adelaide Arena	N/A	boxscore
8/11/2002	Wollongong Hawks	111–104	Victoria Giants	WIN Entertainment Centre	N/A	boxscore
8/11/2002	Perth Wildcats	130–127	Sydney Kings	Challenge Stadium	N/A	boxscore
8/11/2002	Melbourne Tigers	108–102	Adelaide 36ers	State Netball and Hockey Centre	N/A	boxscore
9/11/2002	Canberra Cannons	118–99	Victoria Giants	AIS Arena	N/A	boxscore
9/11/2002	Cairns Taipans	118–104	Townsville Crocodiles	Cairns Convention Centre	N/A	boxscore
10/11/2002	West Sydney Razorbacks	111–85	Brisbane Bullets	State Sports Centre	N/A	boxscore

=== Round 7 ===
Date	Home	Score	Away	Venue	Crowd	Boxscore
13/11/2002	Wollongong Hawks	119–93	West Sydney Razorbacks	WIN Entertainment Centre	N/A	boxscore
15/11/2002	West Sydney Razorbacks	92–78	Canberra Cannons	State Sports Centre	N/A	boxscore
15/11/2002	Melbourne Tigers	113–90	Brisbane Bullets	State Netball and Hockey Centre	N/A	boxscore
16/11/2002	Adelaide 36ers	123–111	Victoria Giants	Adelaide Arena	N/A	boxscore
16/11/2002	Townsville Crocodiles	103–95	Perth Wildcats	Townsville Entertainment Centre	N/A	boxscore
17/11/2002	Cairns Taipans	91–95	Perth Wildcats	Cairns Convention Centre	N/A	boxscore
17/11/2002	Sydney Kings	98–100	Canberra Cannons	Sydney Entertainment Centre	N/A	boxscore

=== Round 8 ===
Date	Home	Score	Away	Venue	Crowd	Boxscore
20/11/2002	Victoria Giants	112–106	Brisbane Bullets	Geelong Arena	N/A	boxscore
22/11/2002	Perth Wildcats	103–87	Cairns Taipans	Challenge Stadium	N/A	boxscore
22/11/2002	Victoria Giants	96–100	Townsville Crocodiles	Hisense Arena	N/A	boxscore
23/11/2002	Melbourne Tigers	107–97	Wollongong Hawks	State Netball and Hockey Centre	N/A	boxscore
23/11/2002	Canberra Cannons	123–107	Brisbane Bullets	AIS Arena	N/A	boxscore
23/11/2002	Adelaide 36ers	106–107	Cairns Taipans	Adelaide Arena	N/A	boxscore
23/11/2002	West Sydney Razorbacks	104–87	Townsville Crocodiles	State Sports Centre	N/A	boxscore

=== Round 9 ===
Date	Home	Score	Away	Venue	Crowd	Boxscore
27/11/2002	Cairns Taipans	71–86	Brisbane Bullets	Cairns Convention Centre	N/A	boxscore
27/11/2002	Sydney Kings	102–74	Perth Wildcats	Sydney Entertainment Centre	N/A	boxscore
27/11/2002	Townsville Crocodiles	101–106	Adelaide 36ers	Townsville Entertainment Centre	N/A	boxscore
29/11/2002	Victoria Giants	74–114	Sydney Kings	Hisense Arena	N/A	boxscore
29/11/2002	Wollongong Hawks	94–84	Cairns Taipans	Shoalhaven Stadium	N/A	boxscore
29/11/2002	Canberra Cannons	98–99	Perth Wildcats	AIS Arena	N/A	boxscore
30/11/2002	Melbourne Tigers	100–85	Canberra Cannons	State Netball and Hockey Centre	N/A	boxscore
30/11/2002	West Sydney Razorbacks	116–105	Cairns Taipans	State Sports Centre	N/A	boxscore
30/11/2002	Brisbane Bullets	91–96	Adelaide 36ers	Brisbane Convention & Exhibition Centre	N/A	boxscore

=== Round 10 ===
Date	Home	Score	Away	Venue	Crowd	Boxscore
4/12/2002	Brisbane Bullets	103–96	Sydney Kings	Brisbane Convention & Exhibition Centre	N/A	boxscore
4/12/2002	Wollongong Hawks	101–113	Adelaide 36ers	WIN Entertainment Centre	N/A	boxscore
7/12/2002	Melbourne Tigers	95–96	West Sydney Razorbacks	State Netball and Hockey Centre	N/A	boxscore
7/12/2002	Brisbane Bullets	93–91	Townsville Crocodiles	Brisbane Convention & Exhibition Centre	N/A	boxscore
7/12/2002	Canberra Cannons	109–114	Adelaide 36ers	AIS Arena	N/A	boxscore
7/12/2002	Victoria Giants	102–133	Perth Wildcats	Hisense Arena	N/A	boxscore

=== Round 11 ===
Date	Home	Score	Away	Venue	Crowd	Boxscore
10/12/2002	Brisbane Bullets	94–111	Wollongong Hawks	Brisbane Convention & Exhibition Centre	N/A	boxscore
11/12/2002	Adelaide 36ers	107–106	Melbourne Tigers	Adelaide Arena	N/A	boxscore
13/12/2002	Brisbane Bullets	88–77	Victoria Giants	Brisbane Convention & Exhibition Centre	N/A	boxscore
13/12/2002	Cairns Taipans	103–91	West Sydney Razorbacks	Cairns Convention Centre	N/A	boxscore
14/12/2002	Perth Wildcats	106–91	Melbourne Tigers	Challenge Stadium	N/A	boxscore
14/12/2002	Townsville Crocodiles	115–101	West Sydney Razorbacks	Townsville Entertainment Centre	N/A	boxscore
14/12/2002	Sydney Kings	87–92	Wollongong Hawks	Sydney Entertainment Centre	N/A	boxscore
15/12/2002	Wollongong Hawks	117–91	Victoria Giants	WIN Entertainment Centre	N/A	boxscore

=== Round 12 ===
Date	Home	Score	Away	Venue	Crowd	Boxscore
18/12/2002	West Sydney Razorbacks	101–99	Wollongong Hawks	State Sports Centre	N/A	boxscore
19/12/2002	Sydney Kings	92–94	Townsville Crocodiles	Sydney Entertainment Centre	N/A	boxscore
20/12/2002	Cairns Taipans	115–91	Victoria Giants	Cairns Convention Centre	N/A	boxscore
20/12/2002	Adelaide 36ers	111–107	West Sydney Razorbacks	Adelaide Arena	N/A	boxscore
21/12/2002	Perth Wildcats	122–114	Adelaide 36ers	Challenge Stadium	N/A	boxscore
21/12/2002	Melbourne Tigers	79–92	Brisbane Bullets	State Netball and Hockey Centre	N/A	boxscore
21/12/2002	Townsville Crocodiles	101–83	Victoria Giants	Townsville Entertainment Centre	N/A	boxscore

=== Round 13 ===
Date	Home	Score	Away	Venue	Crowd	Boxscore
26/12/2002	Victoria Giants	91–98	Sydney Kings	Hisense Arena	N/A	boxscore
27/12/2002	Sydney Kings	114–95	Adelaide 36ers	Sydney Entertainment Centre	N/A	boxscore
27/12/2002	Melbourne Tigers	88–94	Townsville Crocodiles	State Netball and Hockey Centre	N/A	boxscore
27/12/2002	Brisbane Bullets	90–115	Perth Wildcats	Brisbane Convention & Exhibition Centre	N/A	boxscore
28/12/2002	Wollongong Hawks	94–89	Melbourne Tigers	WIN Entertainment Centre	N/A	boxscore
28/12/2002	Adelaide 36ers	112–114	Townsville Crocodiles	Adelaide Arena	N/A	boxscore
28/12/2002	West Sydney Razorbacks	97–105	Perth Wildcats	State Sports Centre	N/A	boxscore

=== Round 14 ===
Date	Home	Score	Away	Venue	Crowd	Boxscore
31/12/2002	Brisbane Bullets	78–87	Melbourne Tigers	Brisbane Convention & Exhibition Centre	N/A	boxscore
31/12/2002	Townsville Crocodiles	121–110	Wollongong Hawks	Townsville Entertainment Centre	N/A	boxscore
31/12/2002	Adelaide 36ers	103–91	Cairns Taipans	Adelaide Arena	N/A	boxscore
3/01/2003	Cairns Taipans	75–86	West Sydney Razorbacks	Cairns Convention Centre	4,520	boxscore
3/01/2003	Sydney Kings	112–96	Melbourne Tigers	Sydney Entertainment Centre	5,975	boxscore
4/01/2003	Townsville Crocodiles	104–99	West Sydney Razorbacks	Townsville Entertainment Centre	5,257	boxscore
4/01/2003	Perth Wildcats	109–89	Wollongong Hawks	Challenge Stadium	4,400	boxscore
4/01/2003	Brisbane Bullets	105–121	Sydney Kings	Brisbane Convention & Exhibition Centre	N/A	boxscore
4/01/2003	Victoria Giants	99–107	Adelaide 36ers	Hisense Arena	3,000	boxscore

=== Round 15 ===
Date	Home	Score	Away	Venue	Crowd	Boxscore
8/01/2003	Victoria Giants	114–100	Canberra Cannons	Geelong Arena	1,050	boxscore
8/01/2003	Brisbane Bullets	101–82	Wollongong Hawks	Brisbane Convention & Exhibition Centre	3,215	boxscore
10/01/2003	Cairns Taipans	98–96	Perth Wildcats	Cairns Convention Centre	4,183	boxscore
10/01/2003	Sydney Kings	111–83	Canberra Cannons	Sydney Entertainment Centre	5,163	boxscore
11/01/2003	Melbourne Tigers	115–86	Victoria Giants	State Netball and Hockey Centre	3,500	boxscore
11/01/2003	Adelaide 36ers	100–82	Canberra Cannons	Adelaide Arena	7,750	boxscore
11/01/2003	Townsville Crocodiles	122–109	Perth Wildcats	Townsville Entertainment Centre	5,257	boxscore
12/01/2003	Wollongong Hawks	87–79	Sydney Kings	WIN Entertainment Centre	5,566	boxscore

=== Round 16 ===
Date	Home	Score	Away	Venue	Crowd	Boxscore
15/01/2003	Melbourne Tigers	94–86	Cairns Taipans	State Netball and Hockey Centre	2,455	boxscore
15/01/2003	West Sydney Razorbacks	112–77	Victoria Giants	State Sports Centre	3,086	boxscore
17/01/2003	Victoria Giants	112–107	Cairns Taipans	Bendigo Stadium	1,095	boxscore
17/01/2003	Wollongong Hawks	89–98	Townsville Crocodiles	WIN Entertainment Centre	4,271	boxscore
18/01/2003	Canberra Cannons	100–96	Melbourne Tigers	AIS Arena	3,131	boxscore
18/01/2003	Sydney Kings	122–108	West Sydney Razorbacks	Sydney Entertainment Centre	7,124	boxscore
18/01/2003	Brisbane Bullets	107–115	Townsville Crocodiles	Brisbane Convention & Exhibition Centre	3,861	boxscore
18/01/2003	Perth Wildcats	119–97	Canberra Cannons	Challenge Stadium	4,306	boxscore

=== Round 17 ===
Date	Home	Score	Away	Venue	Crowd	Boxscore
22/01/2003	Sydney Kings	103–111	Victoria Giants	Sydney Entertainment Centre	4,635	boxscore
22/01/2003	Wollongong Hawks	87–76	Canberra Cannons	WIN Entertainment Centre	3,569	boxscore
22/01/2003	Townsville Crocodiles	97–81	Cairns Taipans	Townsville Entertainment Centre	5,257	boxscore
24/01/2003	Adelaide 36ers	115–108	Brisbane Bullets	Adelaide Arena	7,418	boxscore
25/01/2003	West Sydney Razorbacks	87–106	Wollongong Hawks	State Sports Centre	3,048	boxscore
25/01/2003	Perth Wildcats	106–88	Brisbane Bullets	Challenge Stadium	3,500	boxscore
25/01/2003	Cairns Taipans	71–95	Sydney Kings	Cairns Convention Centre	4,475	boxscore

=== Round 18 ===
Date	Home	Score	Away	Venue	Crowd	Boxscore
29/01/2003	Canberra Cannons	80–108	Sydney Kings	AIS Arena	2,651	boxscore
29/01/2003	Brisbane Bullets	96–111	Perth Wildcats	Brisbane Convention & Exhibition Centre	2,980	boxscore
29/01/2003	Adelaide 36ers	128–105	West Sydney Razorbacks	Adelaide Arena	6,667	boxscore
1/02/2003	Melbourne Tigers	91–87	Perth Wildcats	State Netball and Hockey Centre	2,956	boxscore
1/02/2003	Wollongong Hawks	111–85	Brisbane Bullets	WIN Entertainment Centre	4,000	boxscore
1/02/2003	West Sydney Razorbacks	104–101	Sydney Kings	State Sports Centre	4,112	boxscore
1/02/2003	Victoria Giants	106–109	Townsville Crocodiles	Dandenong Stadium	2,154	boxscore
1/02/2003	Cairns Taipans	123–88	Canberra Cannons	Cairns Convention Centre	4,300	boxscore

=== Round 19 ===
Date	Home	Score	Away	Venue	Crowd	Boxscore
5/02/2003	Canberra Cannons	99–91	Victoria Giants	AIS Arena	2,349	boxscore
5/02/2003	Perth Wildcats	97–99	Sydney Kings	Challenge Stadium	3,868	boxscore
7/02/2003	Adelaide 36ers	122–104	Perth Wildcats	Adelaide Arena	7,593	boxscore
8/02/2003	Townsville Crocodiles	103–88	Canberra Cannons	Townsville Entertainment Centre	5,257	boxscore
8/02/2003	West Sydney Razorbacks	101–104	Victoria Giants	State Sports Centre	3,413	boxscore
8/02/2003	Cairns Taipans	93–87	Wollongong Hawks	Cairns Convention Centre	4,382	boxscore
8/02/2003	Melbourne Tigers	108–103	Adelaide 36ers	State Netball and Hockey Centre	3,410	boxscore

=== Round 20 ===
Date	Home	Score	Away	Venue	Crowd	Boxscore
12/02/2003	Canberra Cannons	84–81	Cairns Taipans	AIS Arena	1,956	boxscore
12/02/2003	Melbourne Tigers	90–95	Sydney Kings	State Netball and Hockey Centre	2,669	boxscore
14/02/2003	Wollongong Hawks	100–116	Adelaide 36ers	WIN Entertainment Centre	4,000	boxscore
14/02/2003	Victoria Giants	98–106	Melbourne Tigers	Hisense Arena	4,765	boxscore
15/02/2003	Perth Wildcats	124–101	West Sydney Razorbacks	Challenge Stadium	3,596	boxscore
15/02/2003	Townsville Crocodiles	103–93	Canberra Cannons	Townsville Entertainment Centre	5,257	boxscore
15/02/2003	Sydney Kings	111–84	Brisbane Bullets	Sydney Entertainment Centre	5,540	boxscore
18/02/2003	Perth Wildcats	106–91	West Sydney Razorbacks	Bunbury Stadium	1,500	boxscore

=== Round 21 ===
Date	Home	Score	Away	Venue	Crowd	Boxscore
19/02/2003	Canberra Cannons	90–104	Cairns Taipans	AIS Arena	1,564	boxscore
20/02/2003	Townsville Crocodiles	120–75	Brisbane Bullets	Townsville Entertainment Centre	5,257	boxscore
21/02/2003	Brisbane Bullets	66–79	Canberra Cannons	Brisbane Convention & Exhibition Centre	3,890	boxscore
21/02/2003	Victoria Giants	77–102	Cairns Taipans	Dandenong Stadium	1,979	boxscore
22/02/2003	Canberra Cannons	94–106	Perth Wildcats	State Sports Centre	1,450	boxscore
22/02/2003	Adelaide 36ers	97–99	Victoria Giants	Adelaide Arena	7,597	boxscore
22/02/2003	Wollongong Hawks	89–96	Melbourne Tigers	WIN Entertainment Centre	4,305	boxscore
23/02/2003	West Sydney Razorbacks	93–90	Melbourne Tigers	State Sports Centre	3,246	boxscore
23/02/2003	Sydney Kings	100–87	Cairns Taipans	Sydney Entertainment Centre	5,087	boxscore

=== Round 22 ===
Date	Home	Score	Away	Venue	Crowd	Boxscore
26/02/2003	Canberra Cannons	93–140	Wollongong Hawks	Southern Cross Stadium	1,350	boxscore
26/02/2003	Melbourne Tigers	108–99	Cairns Taipans	State Netball and Hockey Centre	2,430	boxscore
26/02/2003	Sydney Kings	114–99	Adelaide 36ers	Sydney Entertainment Centre	5,105	boxscore
27/02/2003	Wollongong Hawks	124–94	Canberra Cannons	WIN Entertainment Centre	3,265	boxscore
28/02/2003	Brisbane Bullets	85–108	West Sydney Razorbacks	Brisbane Convention & Exhibition Centre	3,300	boxscore
1/03/2003	Townsville Crocodiles	106–104	Melbourne Tigers	Townsville Entertainment Centre	5,257	boxscore
1/03/2003	Perth Wildcats	118–88	Victoria Giants	Challenge Stadium	3,667	boxscore
1/03/2003	Canberra Cannons	103–113	West Sydney Razorbacks	Southern Cross Stadium	1,979	boxscore
1/03/2003	Cairns Taipans	128–109	Adelaide 36ers	Cairns Convention Centre	5,159	boxscore

== Ladder ==
Pos	2002–03 NBL season											
Pos	Team	Pld	W	L	PCT	Last 5	Streak	Home	Away	PF	PA	PP
1	Sydney Kings^{1}	30	22	8	73.33%	4–1	W4	11–4	11–4	3166	2780	113.88%
2	Perth Wildcats^{1}	30	22	8	73.33%	4–1	W4	14–1	8–7	3175	2960	106.72%
3	Townsville Crocodiles	30	19	11	63.33%	5–0	W16	12–3	7–8	3068	3004	102.13%
4	Wollongong Hawks	30	18	12	60.00%	2–3	W2	11–4	7–8	3053	2897	105.38%
5	Adelaide 36ers	30	16	14	53.33%	2–3	L3	9–6	7–8	3198	3162	101.14%
6	Melbourne Tigers	30	15	15	50.00%	4–1	W1	10–5	5–10	2953	2908	101.55%
7	West Sydney Razorbacks	30	14	16	46.67%	3–2	W3	10–5	4–11	3020	3072	98.31%
8	Cairns Taipans	30	13	17	43.33%	3–2	W1	8–7	5–10	2897	2913	99.45%
9	Canberra Cannons	30	11	19	36.67%	1–4	L4	8–7	3–12	2832	3049	92.88%
10	Victoria Giants	30	9	21	30.00%	2–3	L1	6–9	3–12	2945	3225	91.32%
11	Brisbane Bullets	30	6	24	20.00%	0–5	L9	4–11	2–13	2797	3134	89.25%

Updated to match(es) played on 1 March 2003. Source: NBL.com.au

^{1}Sydney Kings won Head-to-Head (2-1).

== Finals ==
=== Playoff bracket ===
Qualifying Finals
1	Sydney Kings	101	104	114
6	Melbourne Tigers	89	108	89
2	Perth Wildcats	119	91	94
5	Adelaide 36ers	116	99	86
3	Townsville Crocodiles	87	101	X
4	Wollongong Hawks	97	102	X

Semifinals
1	Sydney Kings	124	91	114
3	Townsville Crocodiles	107	113	99
2	Perth Wildcats	121	113	X
4	Wollongong Hawks	90	84	X

Grand Final
1	Sydney Kings	98	117	X
2	Perth Wildcats	94	101	X

=== Qualifying Finals ===
Date	Home	Score	Away	Venue	Crowd	Boxscore
8/03/2003	Melbourne Tigers	89–101	Sydney Kings	State Netball and Hockey Centre	3,500	boxscore
8/03/2003	Adelaide 36ers	116–119	Perth Wildcats	Adelaide Arena	6,563	boxscore
8/03/2003	Wollongong Hawks	97–87	Townsville Crocodiles	WIN Entertainment Centre	4,391	boxscore
10/03/2003	Sydney Kings	104–108	Melbourne Tigers	Sydney Entertainment Centre	6,501	boxscore
12/03/2003	Perth Wildcats	91–99	Adelaide 36ers	Challenge Stadium	3,611	boxscore
12/03/2003	Townsville Crocodiles	101–102	Wollongong Hawks	Townsville Entertainment Centre	5,257	boxscore
15/03/2003	Sydney Kings	114–89	Melbourne Tigers	Sydney Entertainment Centre	6,395	boxscore
16/03/2003	Perth Wildcats	94–86	Adelaide 36ers	Challenge Stadium	3,082	boxscore

=== Semi-finals ===
Date	Home	Score	Away	Venue	Crowd	Boxscore
20/03/2003	Townsville Crocodiles	107–124	Sydney Kings	Townsville Entertainment Centre	5,257	boxscore
21/03/2003	Wollongong Hawks	90–121	Perth Wildcats	WIN Entertainment Centre	5,479	boxscore
26/03/2003	Perth Wildcats	113–84	Wollongong Hawks	Challenge Stadium	3,421	boxscore
26/03/2003	Sydney Kings	91–113	Townsville Crocodiles	Sydney Entertainment Centre	7,284	boxscore
29/03/2003	Sydney Kings	114–99	Townsville Crocodiles	Sydney Entertainment Centre	6,025	boxscore

=== Grand Final ===
Date	Home	Score	Away	Venue	Crowd	Boxscore
3/04/2003	Sydney Kings	98–94	Perth Wildcats	Sydney Entertainment Centre	10,439	boxscore
6/04/2003	Perth Wildcats	101–117	Sydney Kings	Challenge Stadium	4,700	boxscore

== 2002–03 NBL statistics leaders ==
Category	Player	Team	Stat
Points per game	Chris Williams	Sydney Kings	23.6
Rebounds per game	Mark Bradtke	Melbourne Tigers	12.9
Assists per game	Ricky Grace	Perth Wildcats	8.0
Steals per game	Darryl McDonald	Victoria Titans	2.4
Blocks per game	Reginald Poole	Canberra Cannons	2.2
Free throw percentage	Andrew Gaze	Melbourne Tigers	89.3%
Three-point field goal percentage	James Harvey	Perth Wildcats	43.8%

== NBL awards ==
- Most Valuable Player: Chris Williams, Sydney Kings
- Rookie of the Year: Gary Boodnikoff, Sydney Kings
- Best Defensive Player: Glen Saville, Wollongong Hawks
- Best Sixth Man: Stephen Black, Perth Wildcats
- Most Improved Player: Matt Burston, Perth Wildcats
- Coach of the Year: Ian Stacker, Townsville Crocodiles

== All NBL Team ==
#	Player	Team
PG	Ricky Grace	Perth Wildcats
SG	Shane Heal	Sydney Kings
SF	Brett Maher	Adelaide 36ers
PF	Chris Williams	Sydney Kings
C	Mark Bradtke	Melbourne Tigers
