= Townsville Entertainment and Convention Centre =

Indoor sports arena in Queensland, Australia

- The Swamp
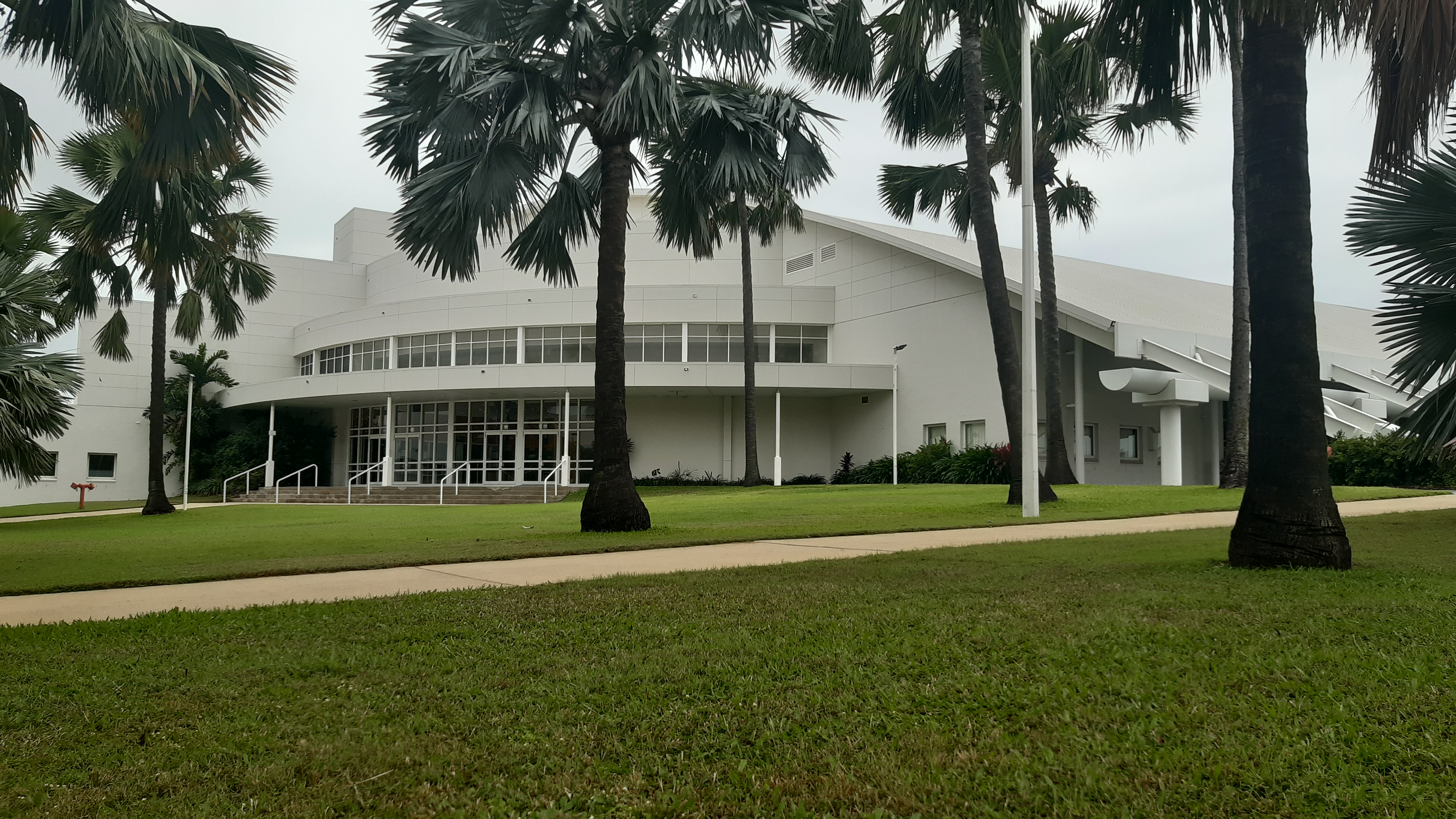
- The centre in June 2025
- Interactive map of Townsville Entertainment and Convention Centre
- Former names: Townsville Entertainment Centre
- Location: Entertainment Drive, Breakwater Island, Townsville, Queensland
- Coordinates: 19°15′2″S 146°49′39″E
- Capacity: 5,257

Construction
- Groundbreaking: 1990
- Opened: 1993

Tenants
- Townsville Crocodiles (NBL) (1993–2014, 2015–2016); 2018 Commonwealth Games; Townsville Fire (WNBL) (2021–present)

Townsville Entertainment and Convention Centre is an indoor sports arena located in Townsville, Queensland, Australia. The capacity of the arena is 5,257 and was built in 1993.

== Tenants ==
From 1993 until the end of the 2013–14 NBL season, the centre was the home arena of the Townsville Crocodiles basketball team. During Crocodiles games, the venue was commonly referred to as "The Swamp". Due to a downturn in attendance figures, the Crocs played at the Townsville RSL Stadium during the 2014–15 NBL season. In May 2015, the Crocodiles announced they would be returning to "The Swamp" for the 2015–16 season.

In 2021, the centre is set to become the new home arena for the Townsville Fire women's basketball team, ahead of the 2021–22 WNBL season. This move will see the centre now commonly referred to as "The Fire Pit".

== See also ==
- List of indoor arenas in Australia
