= Bronzewing-class harbour tug =

Tugboats in the Royal Australian Navy

Class overview
- Operators: Royal Australian Navy
- Completed: 4

General characteristics
- Type: Harbour tug
- Displacement: 47.5 long tons (48 t)
- Length: 15.2 m (49 ft 10 in) o/a
- Beam: 4.6 m (15 ft 1 in)
- Speed: 9.5 knots (17.6 km/h; 10.9 mph)
- Complement: 3

The Bronzewing-class harbour tug was a class of four tugs constructed for the Royal Australian Navy.

- Bronzewing (HTS 501)
- Currawong (HTS 502)
- HTS 503
- Mollymawk (HTS 504)

HTS 503 was given to Papua New Guinea in 1974. They were constructed by Stannard Bros, Sydney, except for HTS Mollymawk (504), that was constructed by Perris Engineering, Brisbane.

Bronzewing and Currawong are currently on loan to the Sydney Heritage Fleet, where they are often used in support of the James Craig and other heritage ships in the Fleet.
