= SS John Oxley =

Pilot boat, built 1927

- John Oxley in July 2018, undergoing restoration at the Sydney Heritage Fleet shipyard in Rozelle Bay

History

Australia
- Name: SS John Oxley
- Owner: Queensland Harbours and Marine Department (1927–1968); Sydney Heritage Fleet (1997–present)
- Operator: Royal Australian Navy (World War II)
- Builder: Bow, McLachlan & Co, Paisley, Scotland
- Yard number: 464
- Launched: 20 July 1927
- In service: 1927
- Out of service: 1968
- Home port: Moreton Bay (active service); Sydney (preservation)
- Identification: IMO number: 5174234
- Status: Undergoing restoration

General characteristics
- Type: Pilot boat
- Tonnage: 544 GRT; 760 DWT; 212 NRT
- Length: 168 ft (51 m)
- Beam: 32 ft (9.8 m)
- Draught: 11 ft (3.4 m)
- Installed power: 1,400 IHP
- Propulsion: triple expansion steam engine supplied by two Scotch boilers
- Speed: 14 knots (26 km/h; 16 mph)
- Capacity: 14 pilots
- Crew: 15 crew
- Armament: One Oerlikon 20 mm cannon (naval service)

SS John Oxley is a steamship that was previously a pilot boat, lighthouse and buoy tender. The ship was built in Scotland in 1927 for the Queensland Government. The vessel was requisitioned by the Royal Australian Navy during World War II and returned to her duties after the war. John Oxley remained active until 1968 when her deteriorating condition made her unusable. In 1970, the ship was donated by the Queensland Government to the Lady Hopetoun and Port Jackson Marine Steam Museum (now the Sydney Heritage Fleet) for preservation, but due to other projects, work was sidelined until 2004. For the past 20 years the ship has undergone restoration on a floating dock at Rozelle Bay. In April 2022 she was towed to dry dock at Garden Island, successfully refloated and returned to Rozelle Bay for further restoration work afloat.

== Design and construction ==
Bow, McLachlan and Company of Paisley in Renfrewshire, Scotland built John Oxley in 1927, under yard number 464. She was launched on 20 July 1927, and completed later that year. The vessel is 168 feet (51 m) long, with a beam of 32 feet (9.8 m), and a draught of 11 feet (3.4 m). Tonnage values are 544 Gross register tonnage, 760 Deadweight tonnage, and 212 Net Register Tonnage Propulsion is provided by two Scotch marine boilers supplying a triple expansion steam engine, which delivers 1,400 IHP to the propeller, for a maximum speed of 14 knots (26 km/h; 16 mph). The vessel had a crew of 15, and in her role as a pilot boat, could carry 14 harbour pilots.

== Service career ==
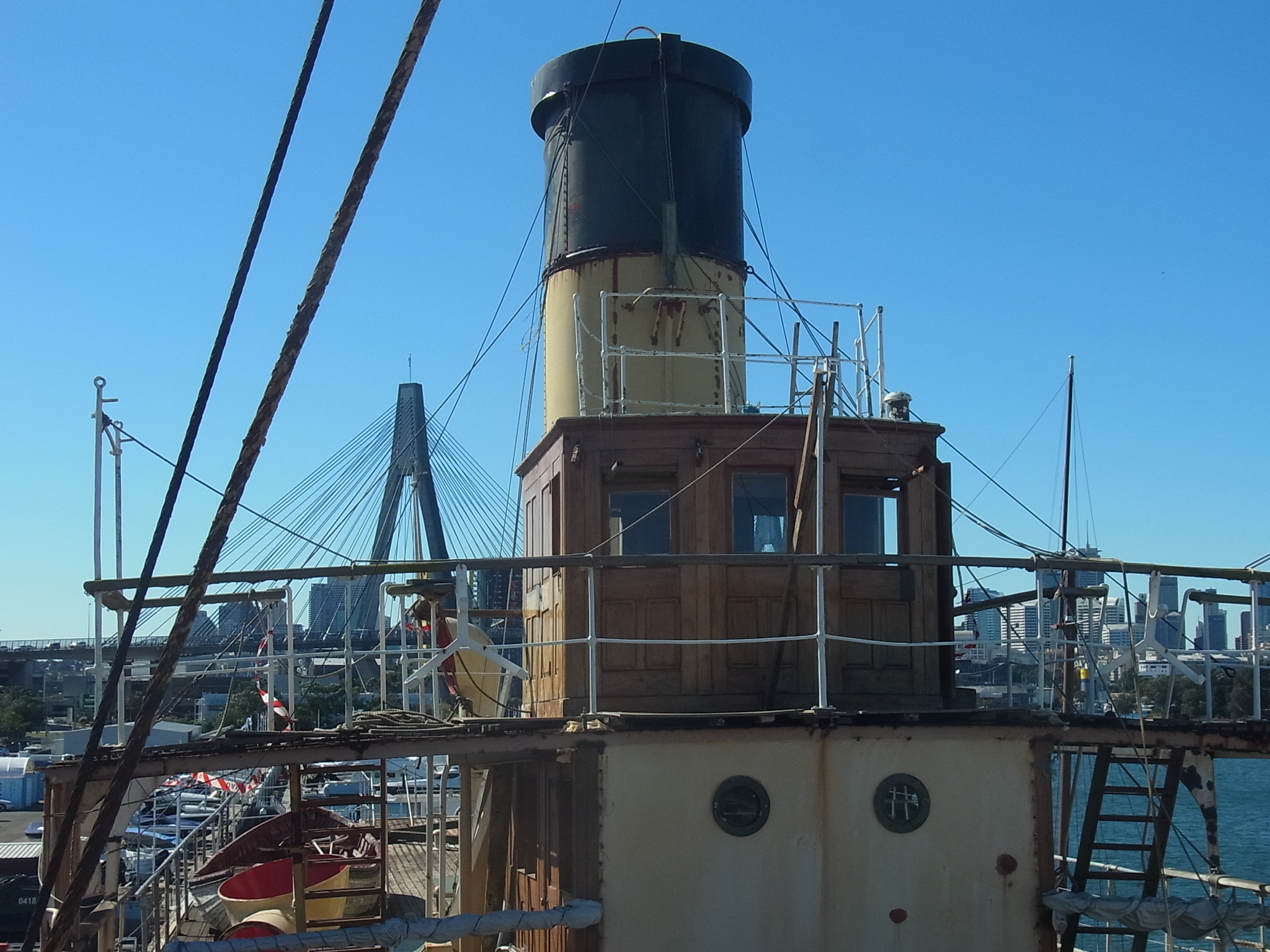
Wheelhouse with chartroom below, Sept 2013

In early October 1927, John Oxley left Greenock, Scotland bound for Brisbane via the Red Sea and Indian Ocean. While en route in the Mediterranean Sea, she responded to a distress signal by the tugboat Jackstay and towed it to Malta. It arrived in Brisbane on 9 December 1927.

She was delivered to the Government of Queensland Harbours and Marine Department, whom she served as a pilot boat in Moreton Bay and buoy tender and lighthouse tender along the Queensland coast.

During World War II, John Oxley was requisitioned by the Royal Australian Navy and a 20mm Oerlikon anti-aircraft gun was mounted on the stern. She returned to her former duties in 1946, and was converted from coal to oil fuel that same year.

John Oxley continued to serve as a pilot tender, lighthouse and buoy tender until 1968 when she was decommissioned. In her later years she had become increasingly decrepit, such that in 1964 the Seamen's Union of Australia's journal called her a "rust heap" with "the worst living conditions of any ship on the entire Australian coast".

== Preservation ==
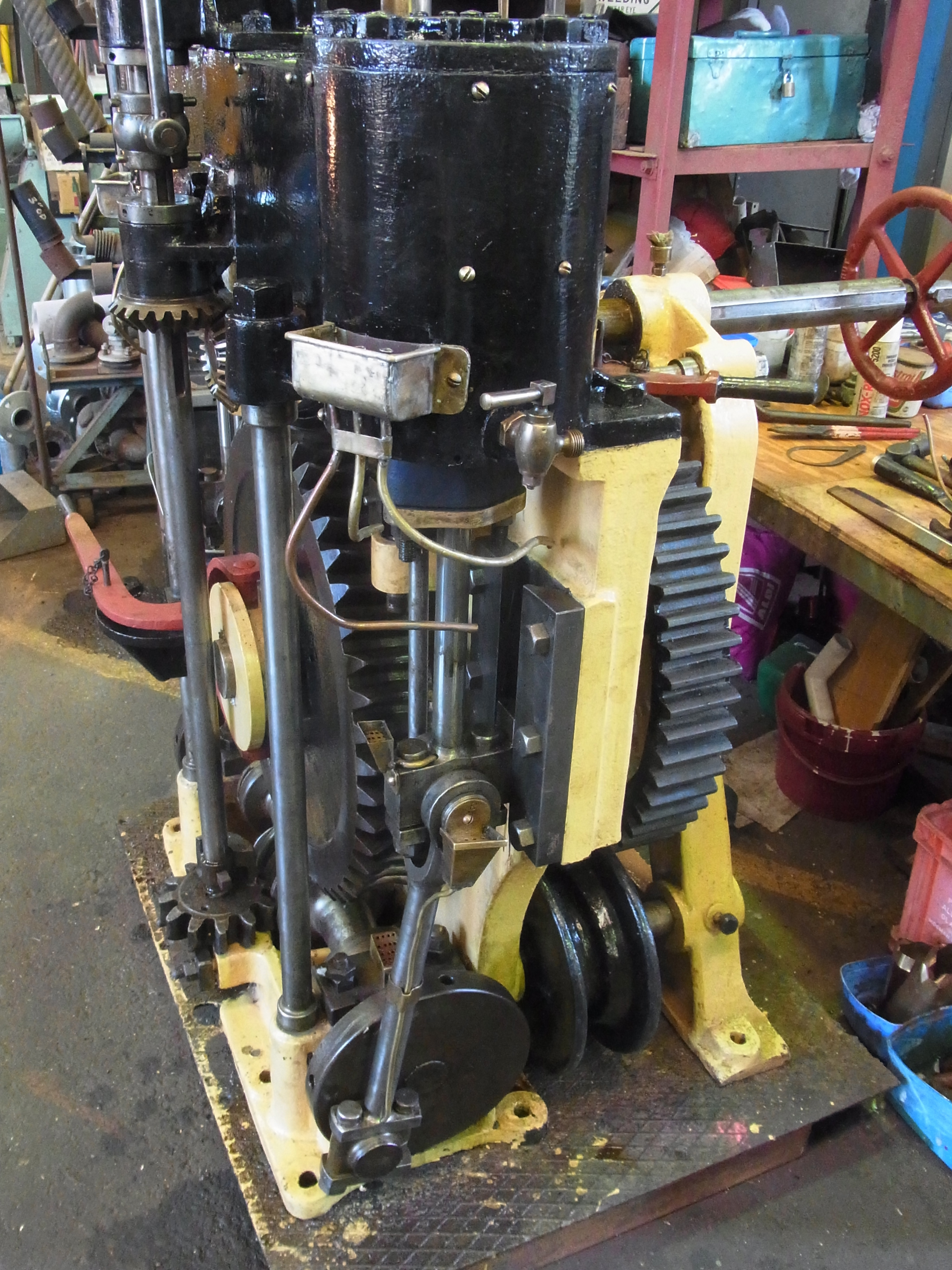
Restored steering engine in March 2014

John Oxley was donated to the Lady Hopetoun and Port Jackson Marine Steam Museum (now the Sydney Heritage Fleet), arriving in Sydney in August 1970 and initially moored at Birkenhead Point. She saw very little repair work until 1997, when restoration on another ship, the barque James Craig, was at a stage where she could be taken off the floating dock. Until then, her hull had gradually deteriorated and she was badly in need of repairs when put on the floating dock in place of the James Craig.

Since 2002 the John Oxley has been under continuous restoration at the shipyard of the Sydney Heritage Fleet in Rozelle Bay. During eighty years on the water, the ship had incurred substantial corrosion to the hull, decks and superstructure. The majority of the plates of the ship's riveted hull have required complete replication using the same hot riveted method as when the ship was built.

The restoration work also entails the repair and reconditioning of all machinery, masts and rigging, timber work, internal fitout and generally making the ship seaworthy. The ship will satisfy the survey requirements for safe operation and make coastal voyages.

== Re-float ==
After 20 years of restoration work on the Sea Heritage Dock, John Oxley was re-floated in the Captain Cook Graving Dock at Garden Island on 2 April 2022, and officially re-launched in a ceremony at Glebe Island the following day. She returned to the Sydney Heritage Fleet base at Rozelle Bay on 14 April 2022 to be moored alongside Kanangra, which has taken her place on the Sea Heritage Dock. John Oxley will now undergo further work towards being fully commissioned, in a time-frame dependent on availability of funding and volunteer labour. It is hoped she'll be steaming the Australian coast once more by around 2026–2027, in time to celebrate the centenary of her launch.

== Gallery ==
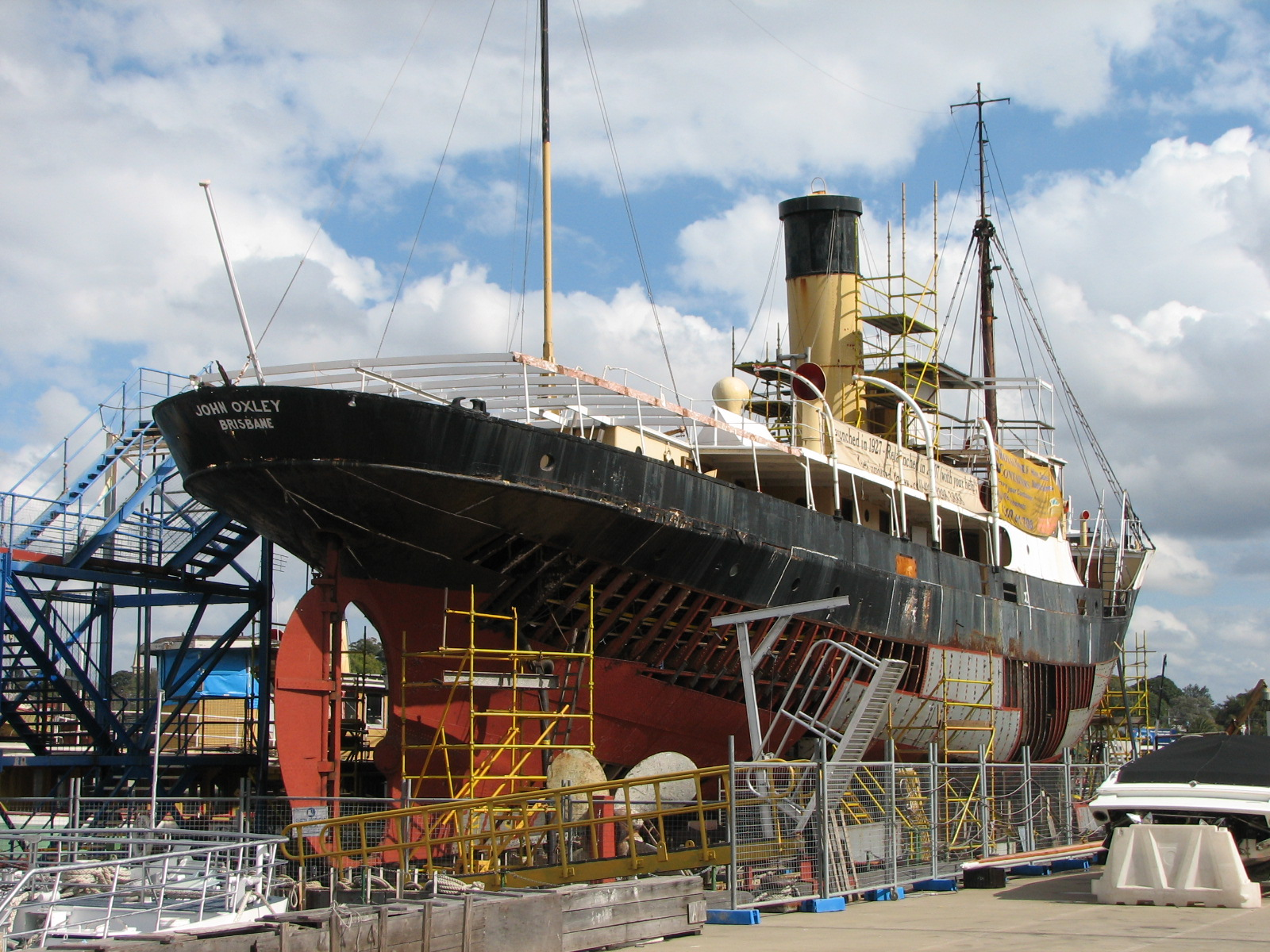
John Oxley on floating dock in 2005

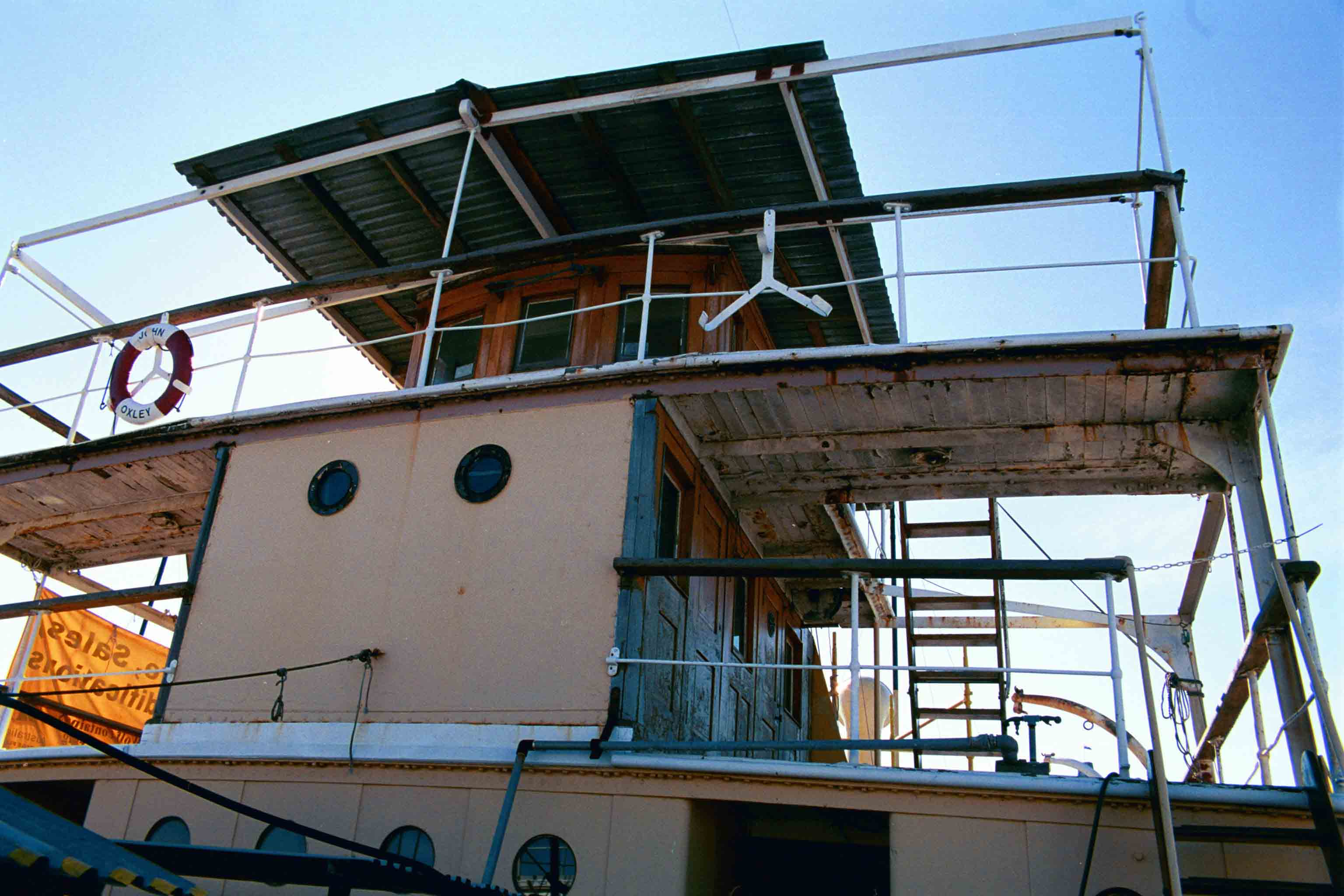
Wheelhouse and bridge superstructure in 2005

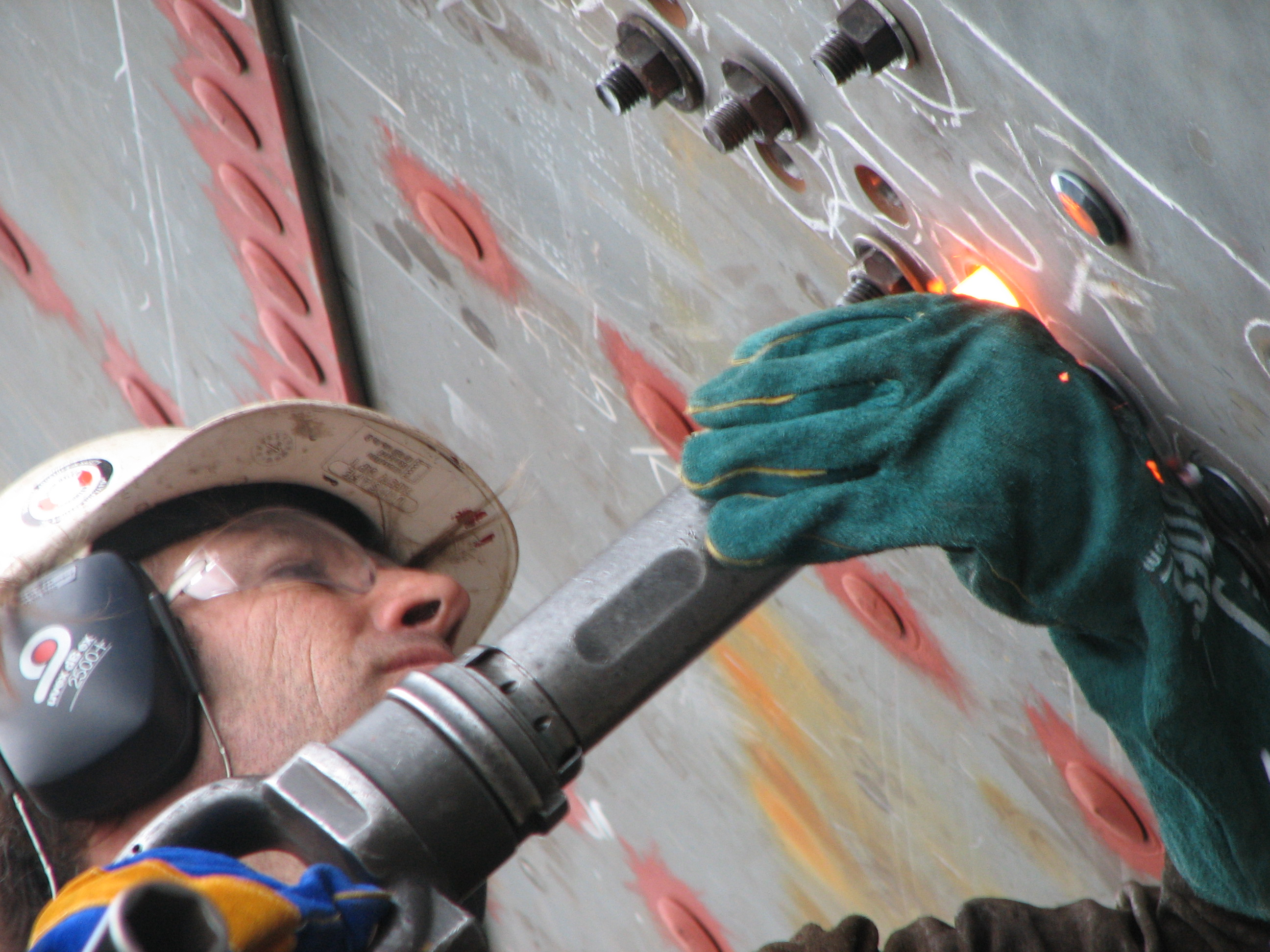
Hot riveting hull plates in 2006

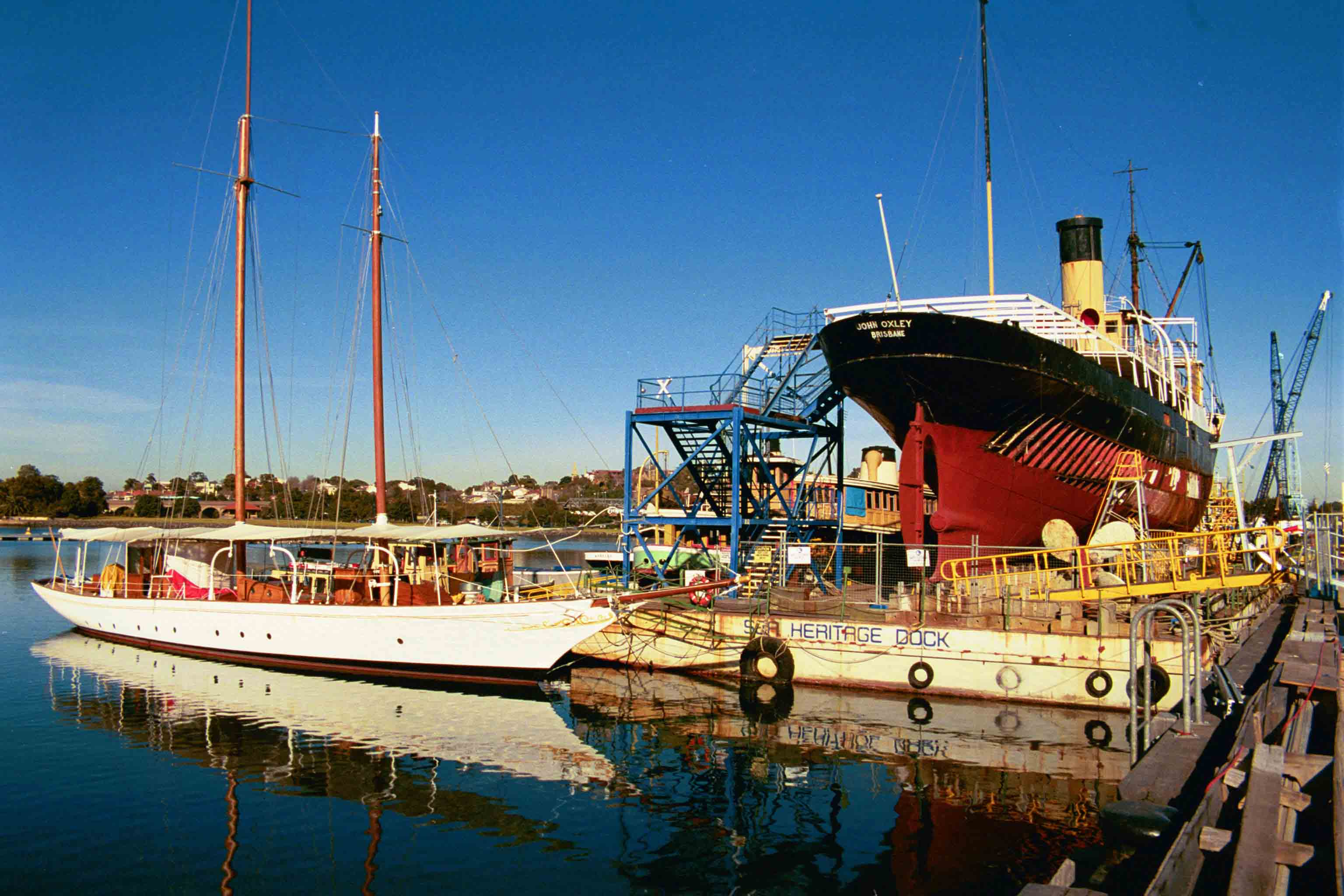
John Oxley and the schooner Boomerang in 2005

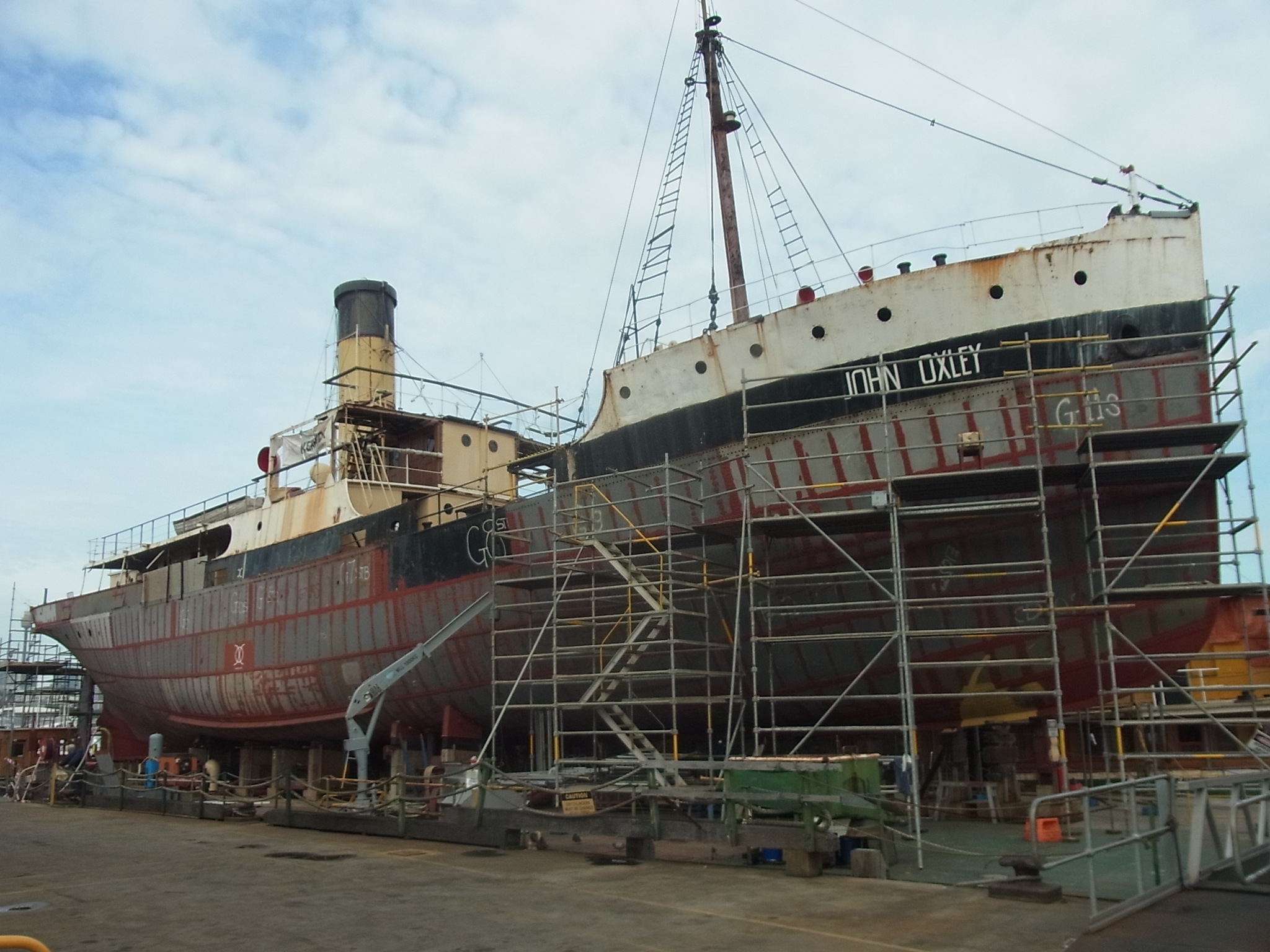
SS John Oxley on floating dock in 2013

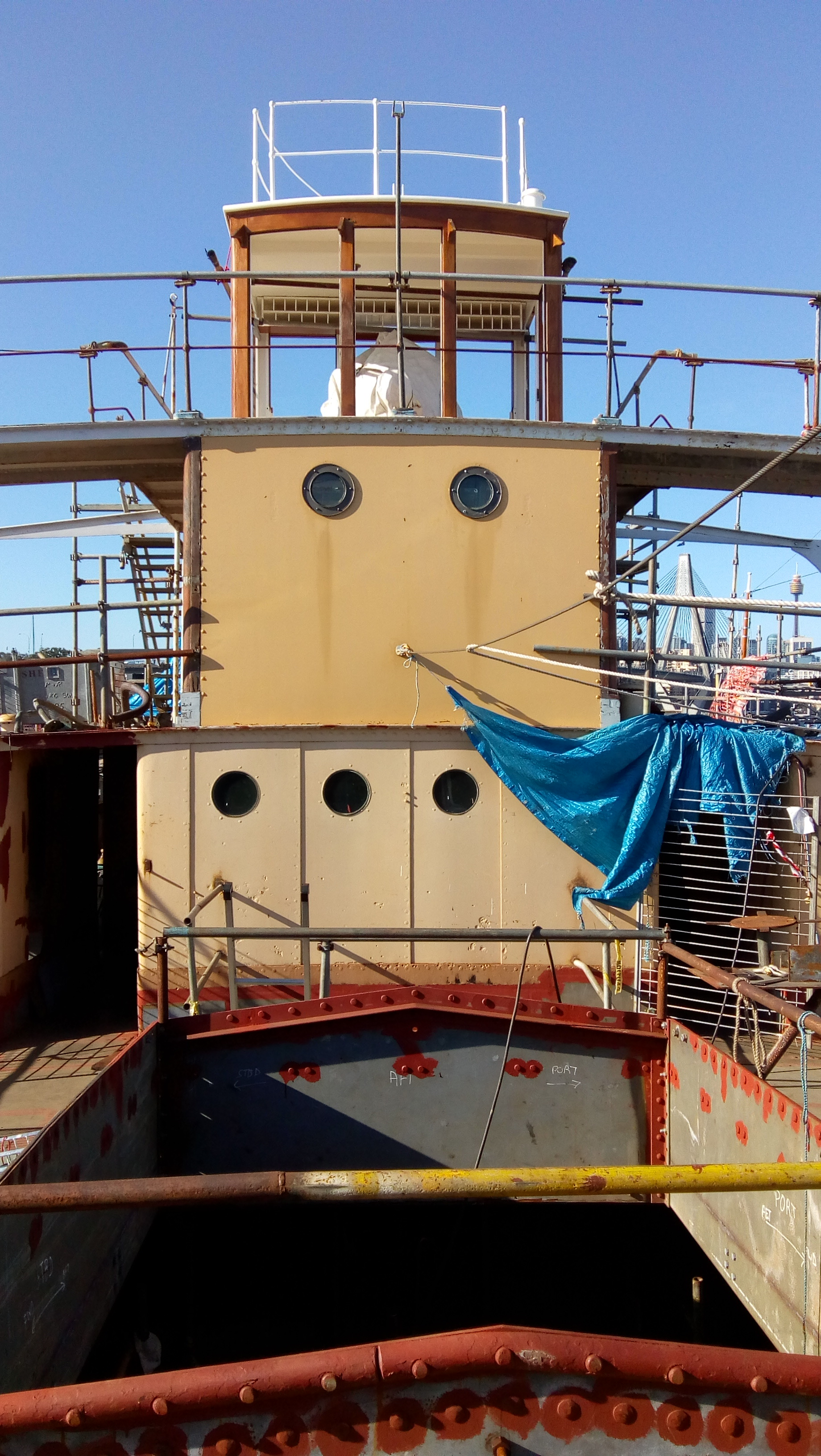
After being removed from the ship for restoration the teak wheelhouse was refitted on July 10, 2018

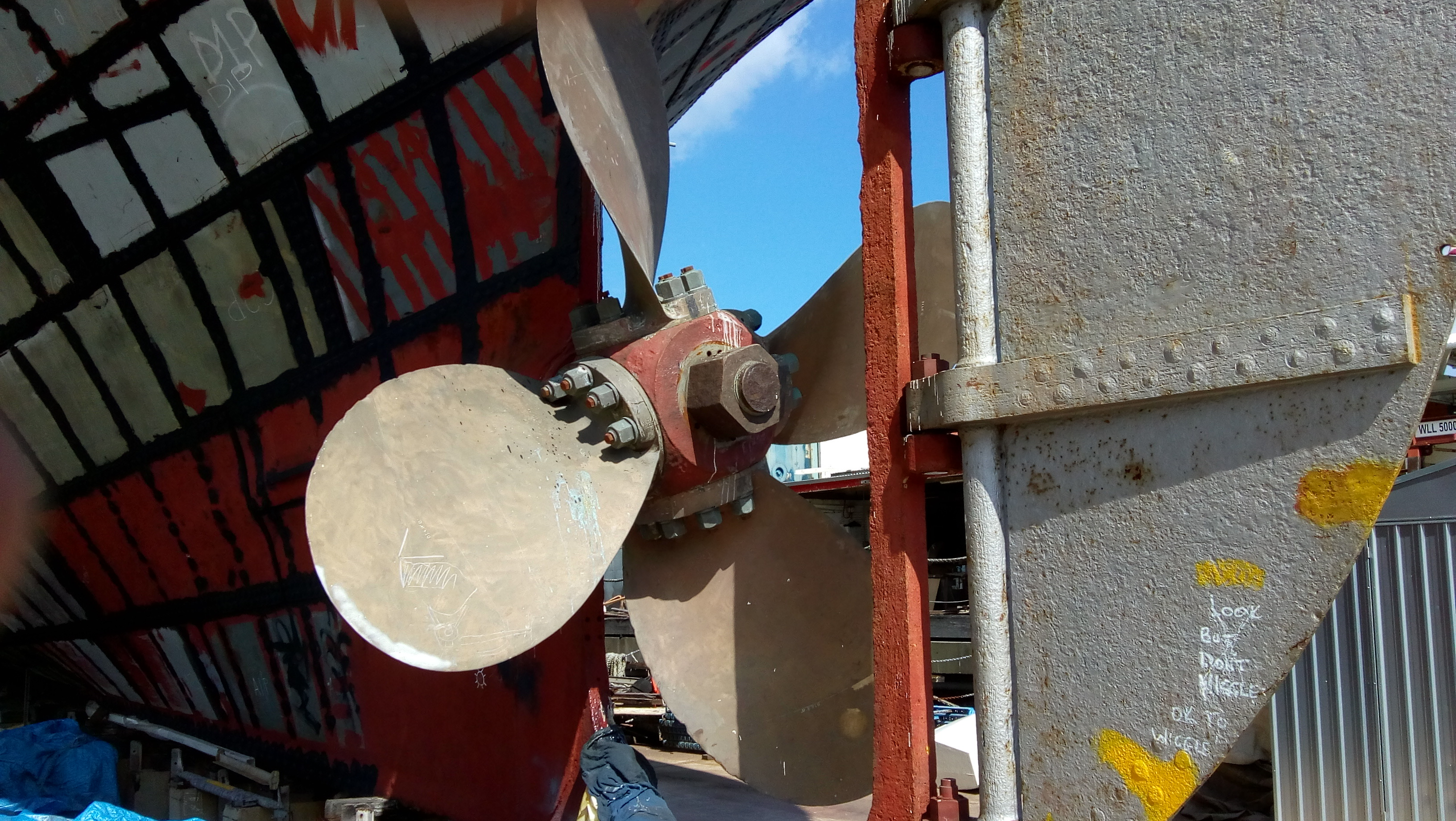
Refitted propeller in 2018

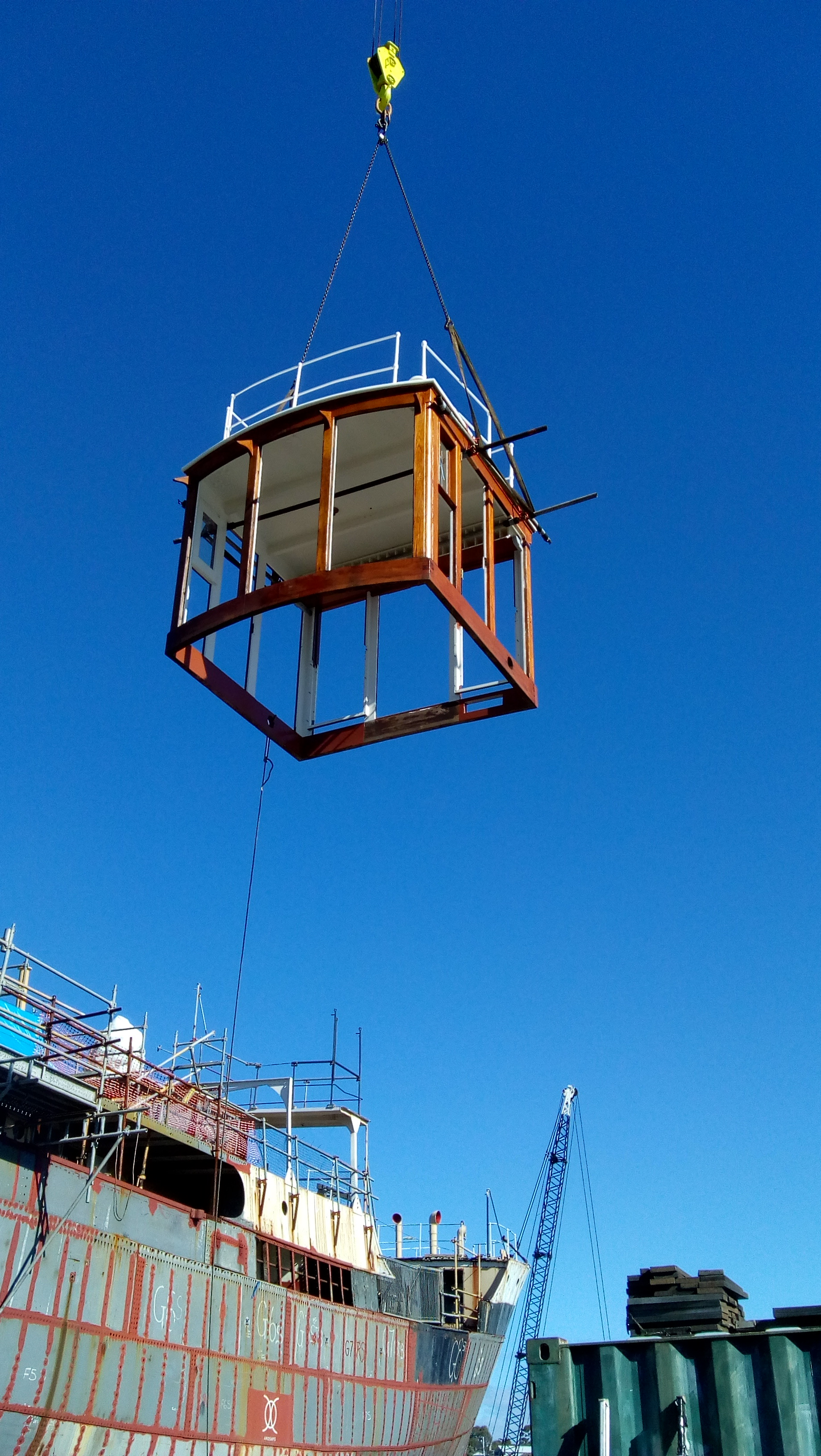
Returning wheelhouse to ship in 2018

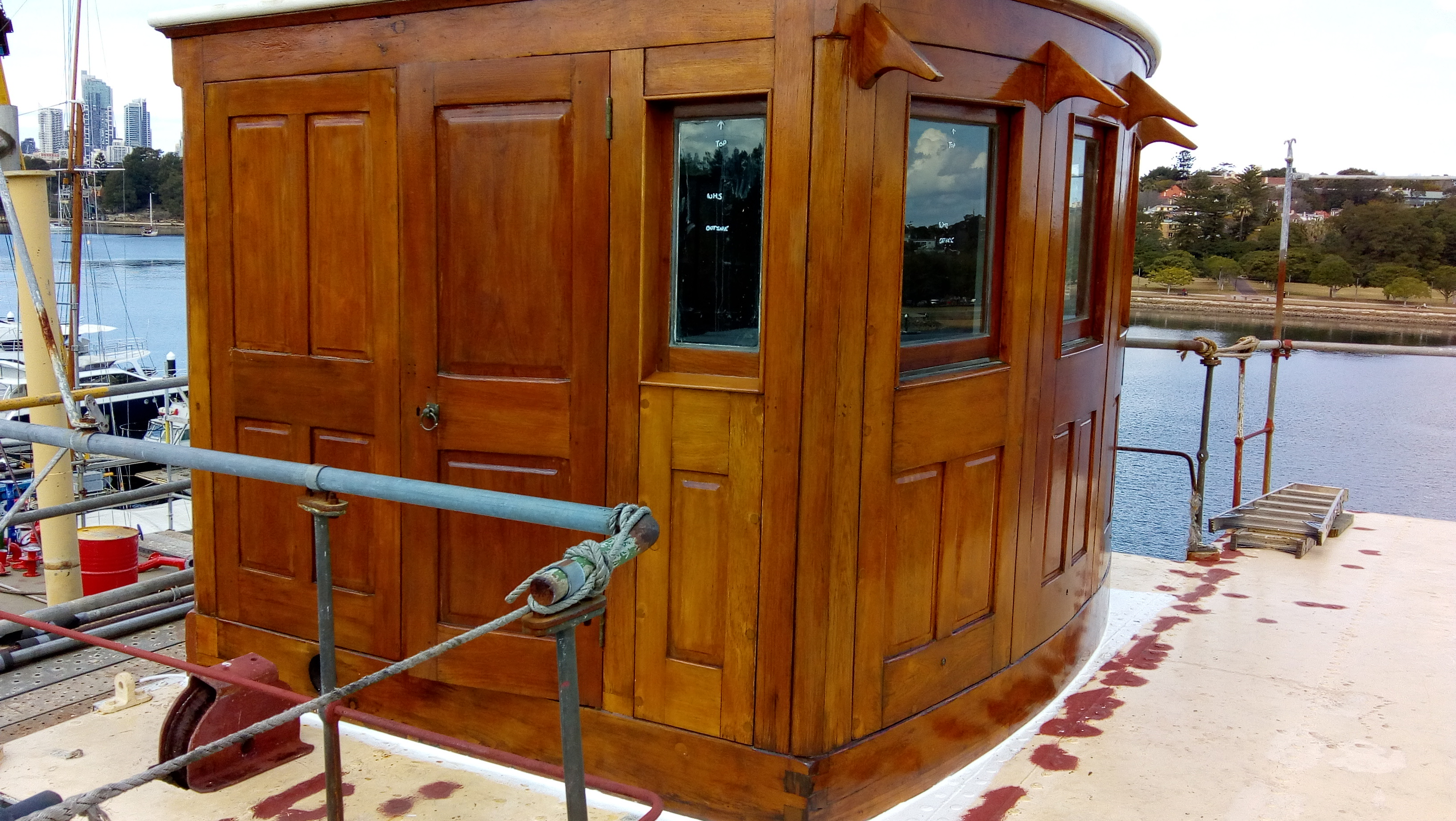
Restored wheelhouse in 2018

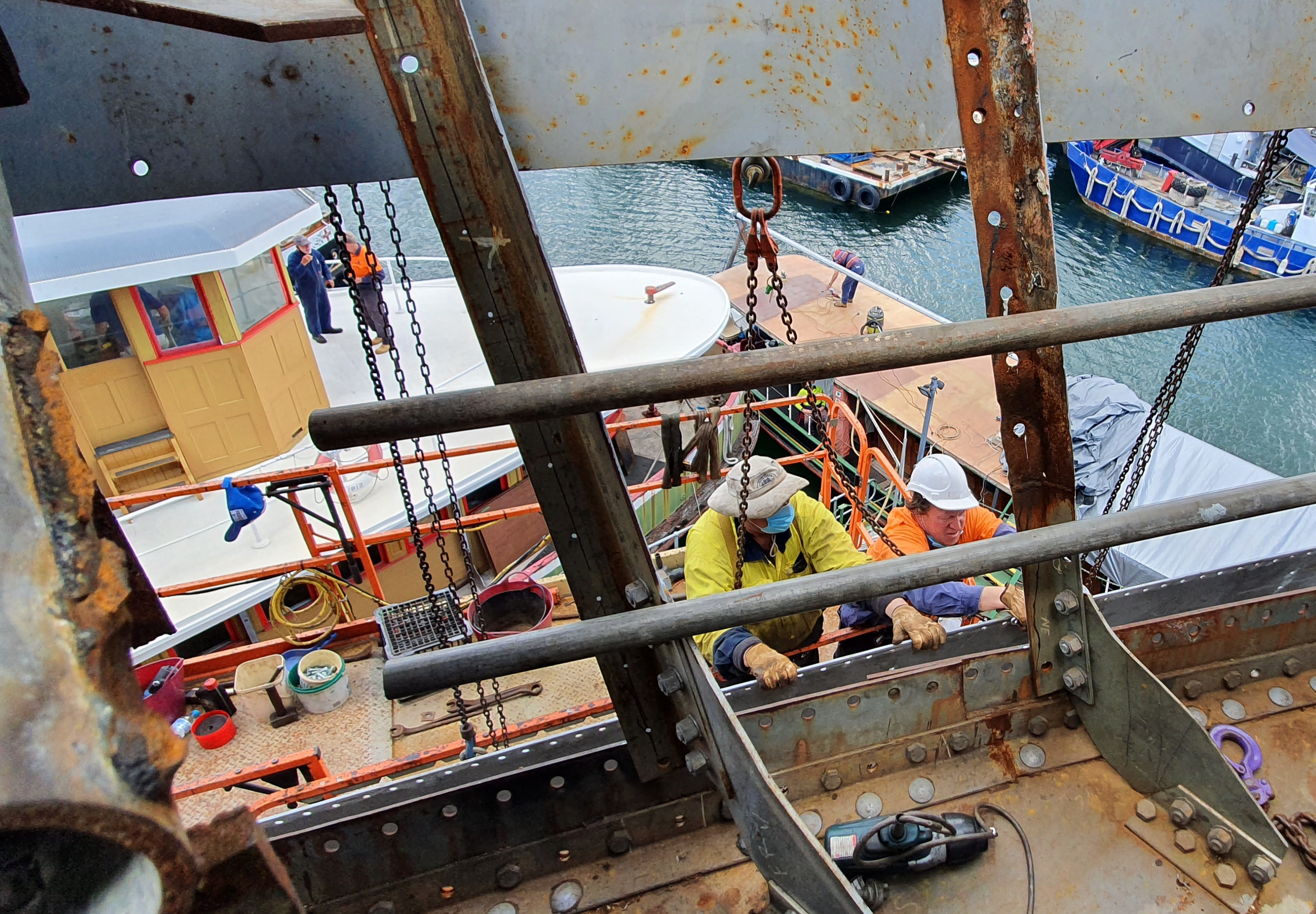
Fitting the last hull plate on the John Oxley, 21 October 2021

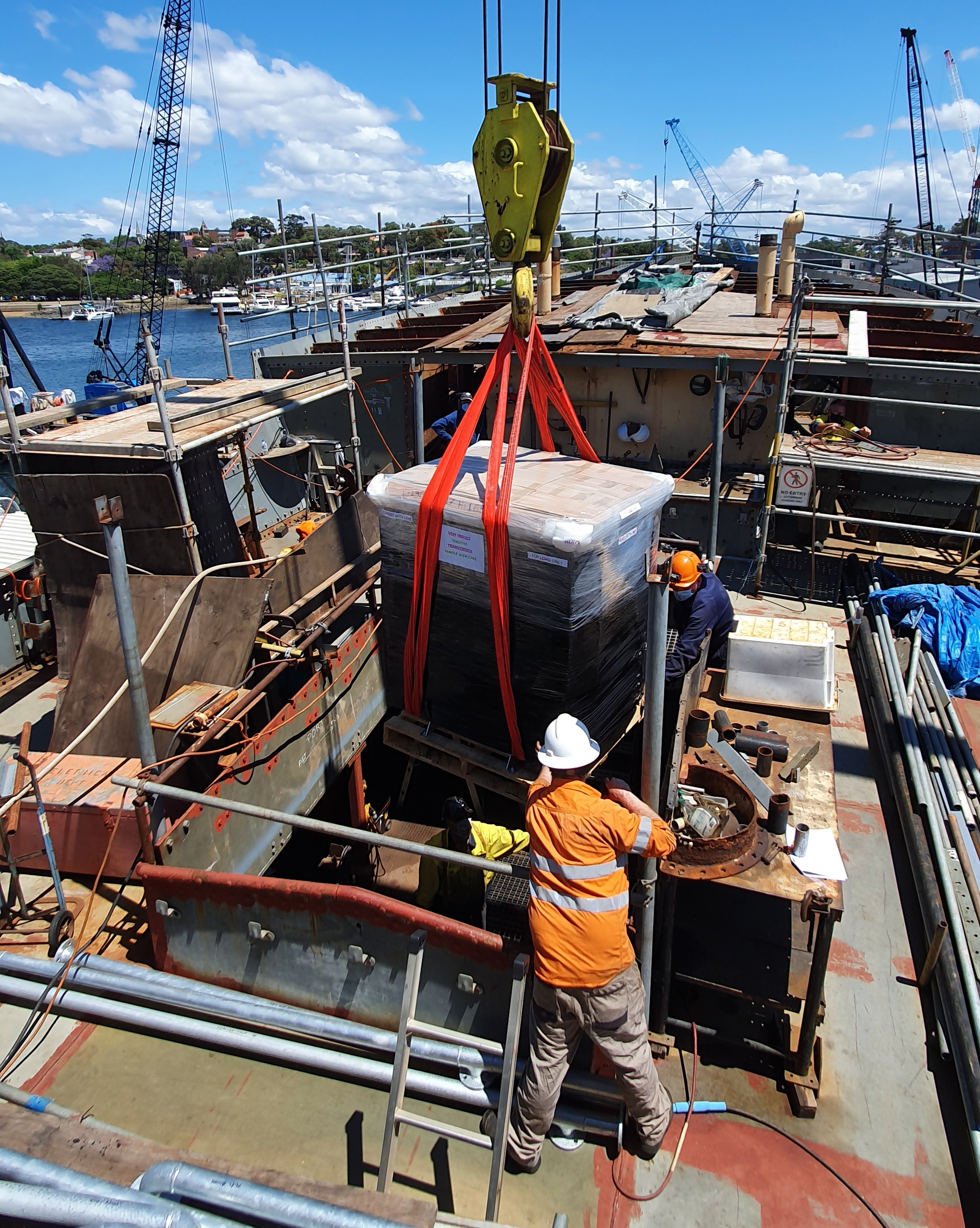
Isolation Transformer being craned aboard Nov 2021

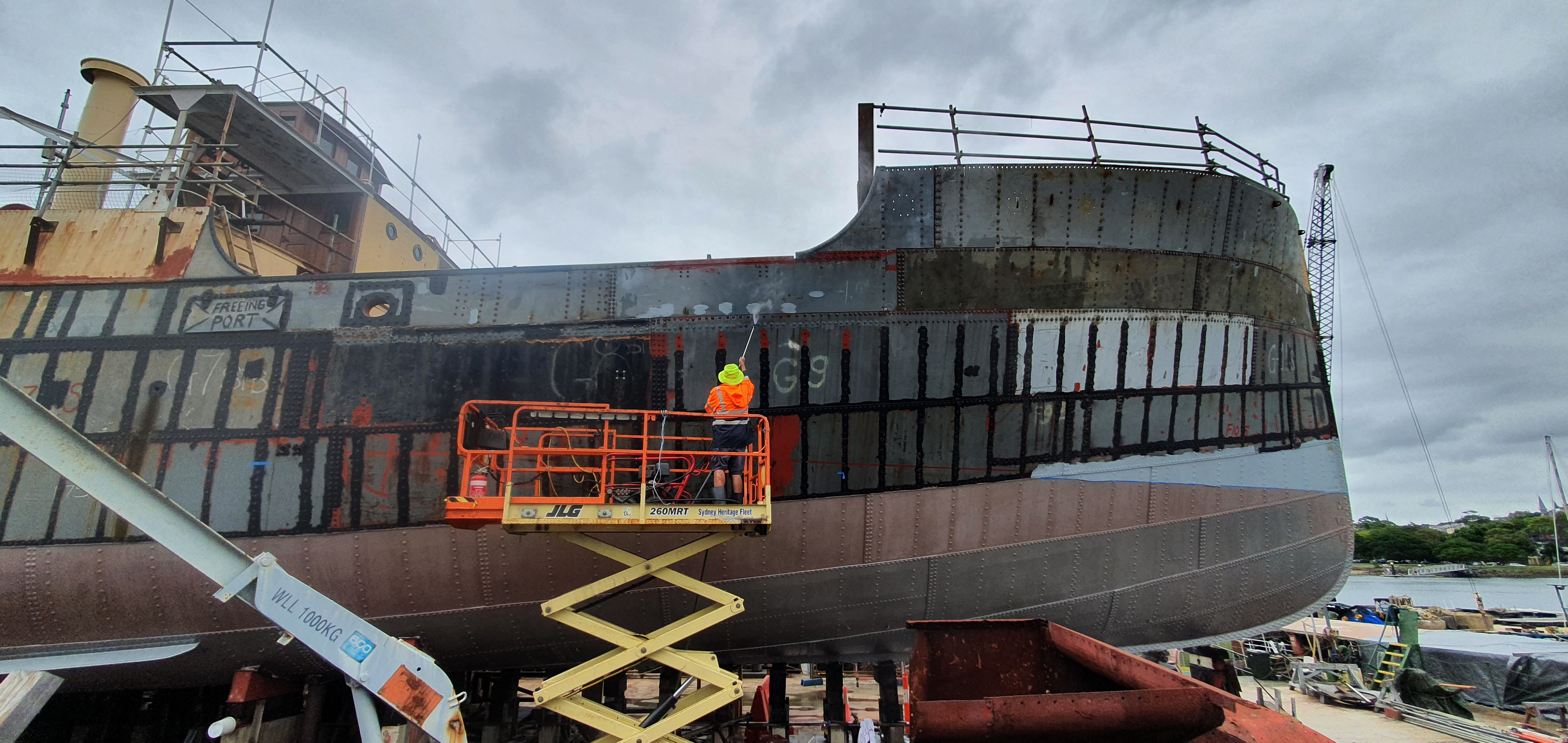
Painting & preparation Feb 2022
