= Brisbane Convention & Exhibition Centre =

Convention centre in Brisbane, Australia

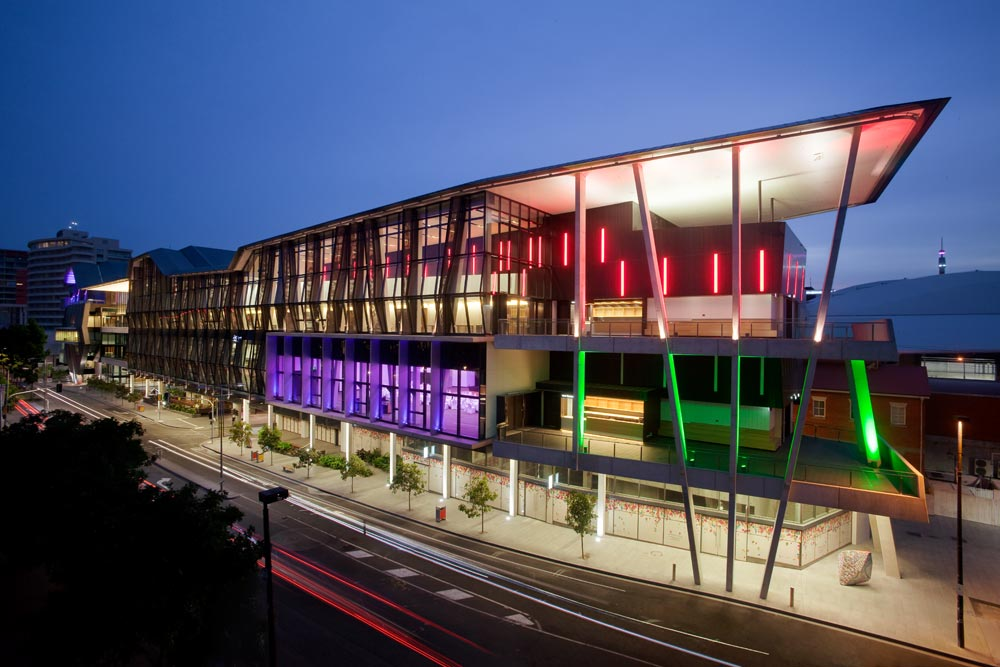
- Grey Street view of the Centre (2012)
- Interactive map of Brisbane Convention & Exhibition Centre
- Address: Cnr Merivale & Grey Streets, South Brisbane, Queensland, Australia
- Location: South Bank
- Coordinates: 27°28′35″S 153°1′6″E
- Owner: South Bank Corporation
- Operator: ASM Global
- Public transit: South Brisbane railway station

Construction
- Opened: 6 June 1995
- Expanded: 2012
- Cost: $170 million $140 million (2012 expansion)

Tenants
- Brisbane Bullets (NBL) (1998–2008, 2016–2019); Queensland Firebirds (ANZ/NNL) (2008–2017)

Website
- bcec.com.au

Brisbane Convention & Exhibition Centre (BCEC) is a convention centre in South Brisbane, Australia. It occupies most of the block bounded by Grey, Melbourne, Merivale and Glenelg streets. The centre is owned by South Bank Corporation and managed by Legends Global.

== History ==
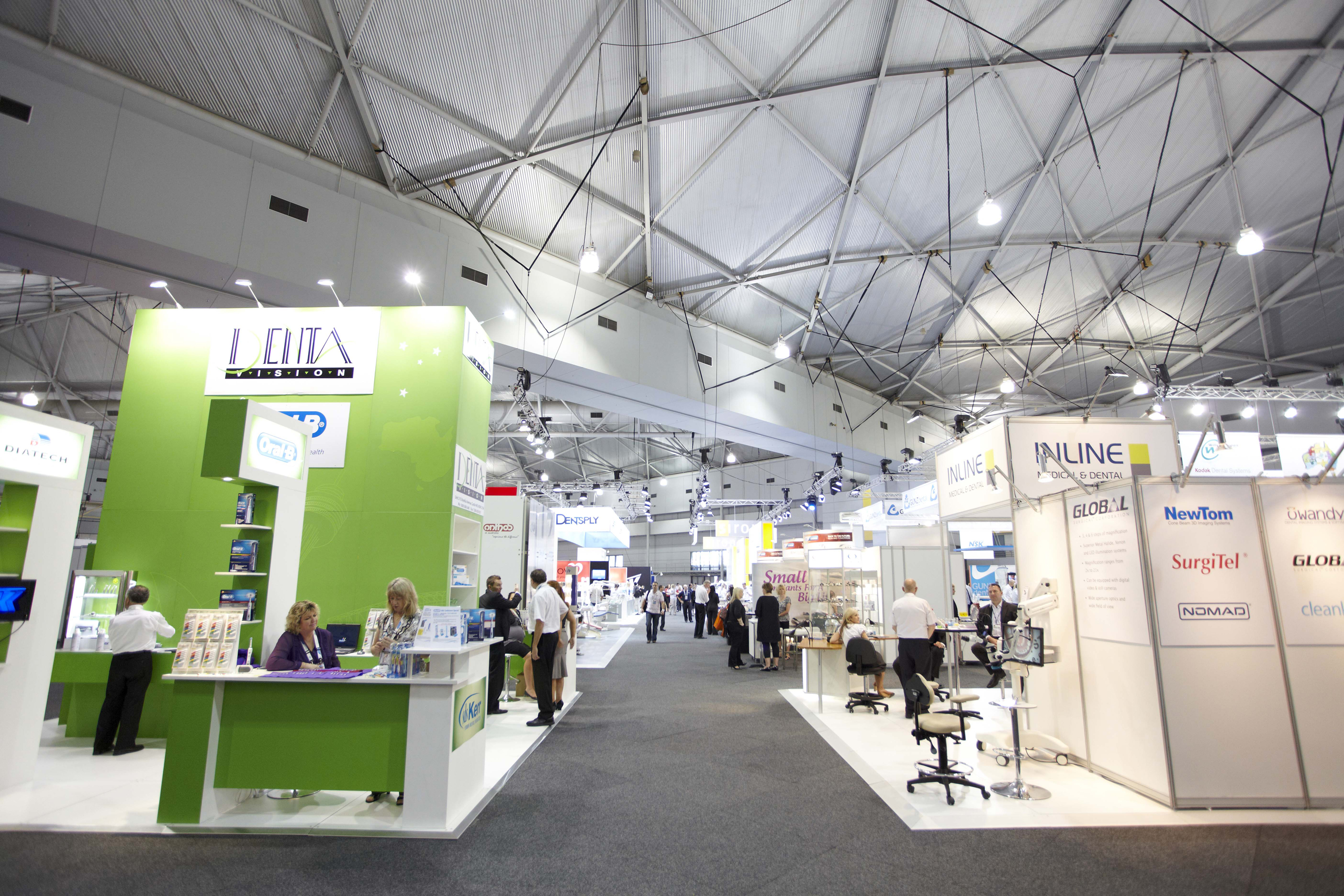
Exhibition Halls in 2012

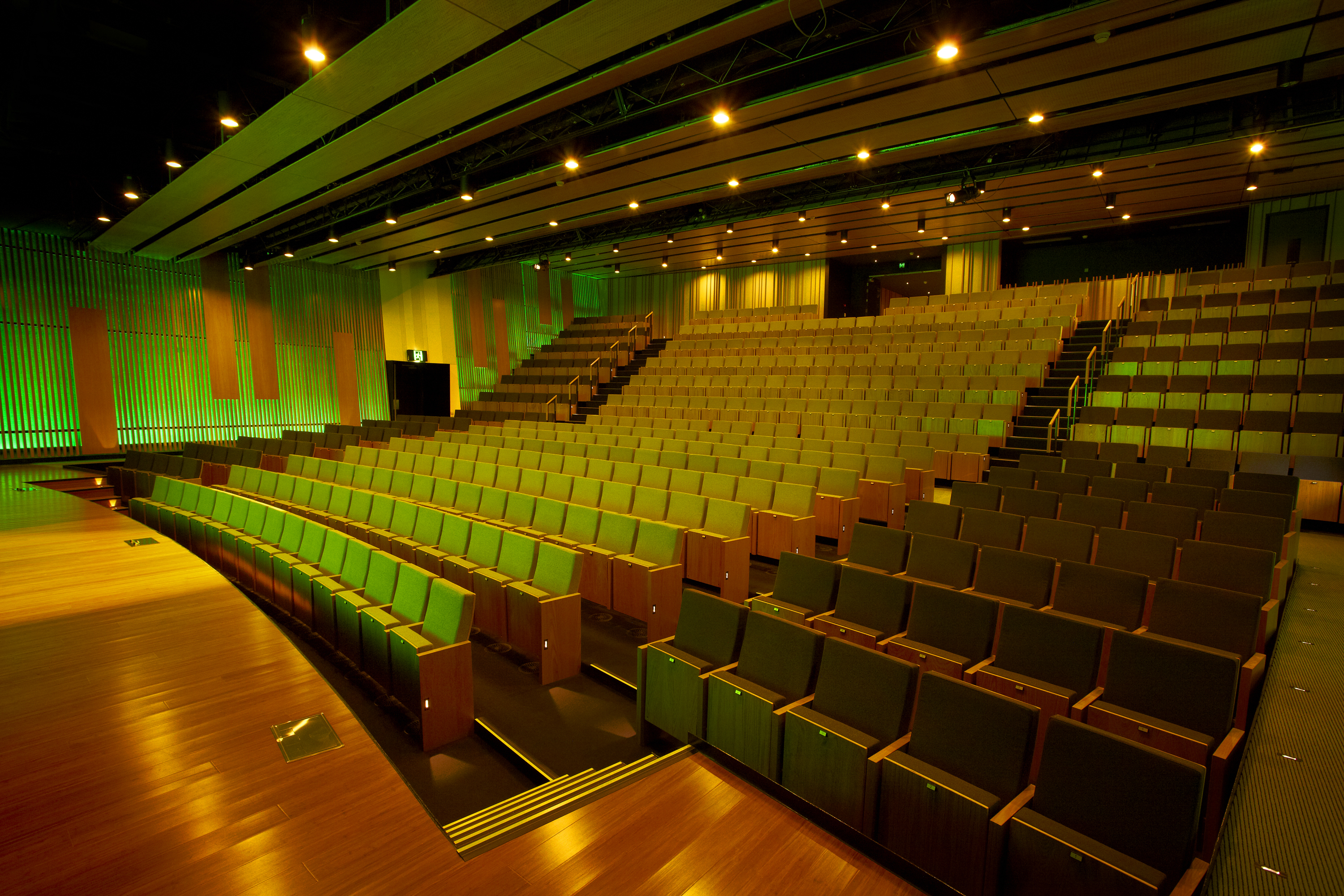
Boulevard Auditorium in 2012

Designed by Cox Architecture, the BCEC was constructed by Leighton Contractors, beginning in March 1993 with the demolition of World Expo Park. Prior to Expo 88, the site was home to South Brisbane railway station's interstate platforms. The building cost $170 million and was mostly funded by the Queensland Government's sale of a casino license, with the remainder funded directly by the government. The centre was completed in May 1995, and opened on 6 June that same year by Premier of Queensland Wayne Goss.

During the 2014 G20 Brisbane summit, The BCEC hosted the event including the International Media Centre. It was the largest media operation in the country's history with capacity for more than 2,500 journalists.

On 1 June 2021, around 150 protesters converged on the centre to protest the Land Forces convention. Fake blood was spread over the stairs and pavement outside the centre. Seven arrests were made.

During the COVID-19 pandemic the centre was used as mass vaccination hub. It was the largest hub set up in Queensland.

=== Expansion ===
The design of an expansion to BCEC on Grey Street was approved in 2007. Laing O'Rourke was appointed as the project's builder in June 2009 after a delay caused by budget issues, and construction began in 2010. The project was completed in early 2012, and opened on 25 January. It cost $140 million and was funded by the Queensland Government. The five-level expansion has 25,000 m^{2} of floorspace and includes two auditoria for 400 and 600 with accompanying foyer space, speakers’ facilities, and private boardrooms. The expansion saw the commission of an integrated artwork sited within the foyers and along Grey Street titled 'Pamphlet' 2012 by artist Bruce Reynolds, curated by Jacqueline Armitstead of Armitstead ART Consulting, and funded by Art + Place, Queensland Government's public art fund.

== Design ==
The building is 450 m (1,480 ft) in length, 120 m (390 ft) wide, and 24 m (79 ft) high. The complex roof design is based on five hyperbolic paraboloids. The building is stabilised by concrete shear walls and clad in steel. A car park is located on the ground floor.

== Events ==
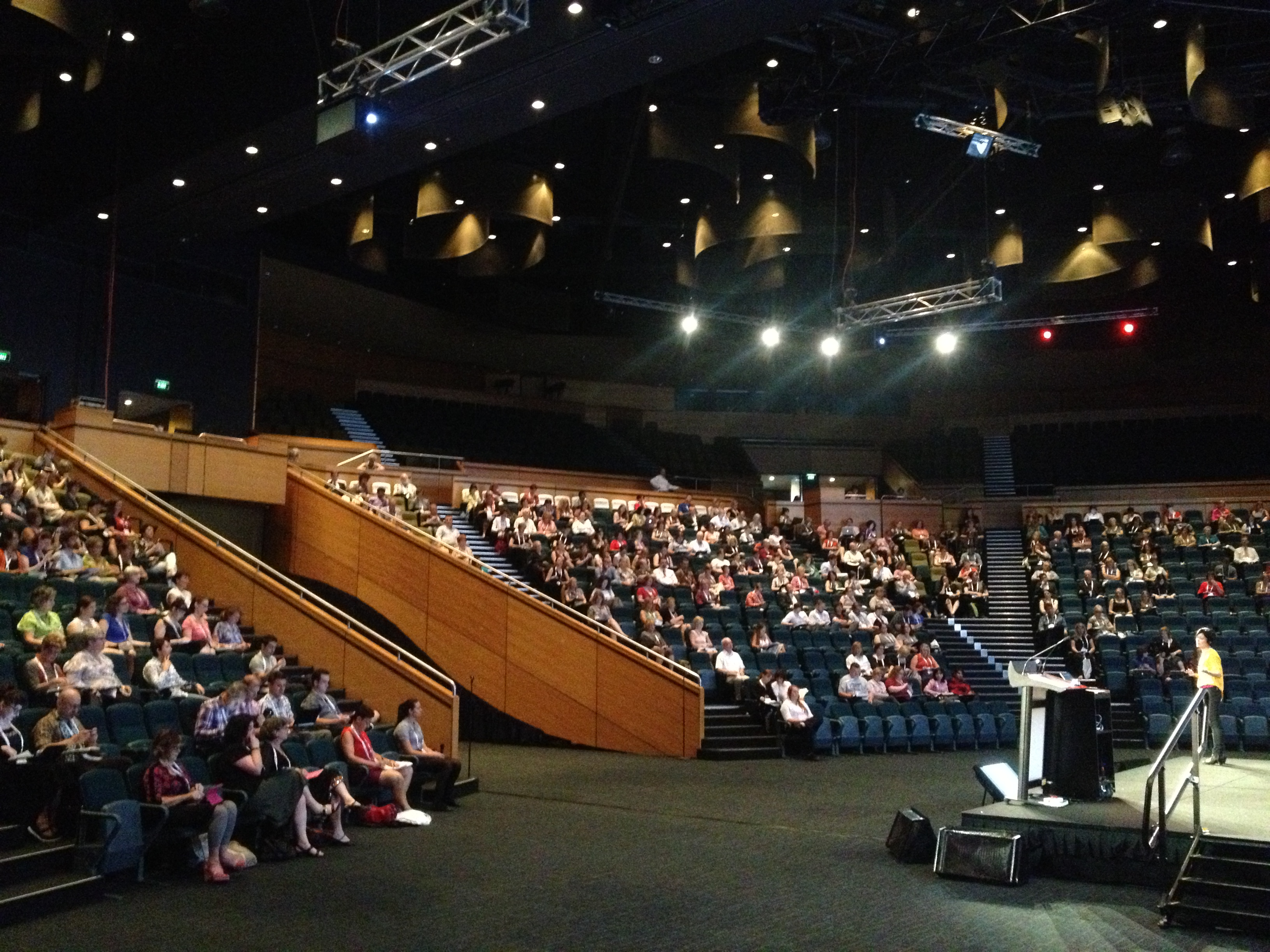
A speaker delivers a keynote address at the Australian Libraries Information Association conference, 2013

BCEC hosts events such as the Brisbane International Boat Show, Home Show, Lifeline's Bookfest, Brides Wedding & Honeymoon Expo, World Travel Expo, graduation ceremonies for Griffith University and Southbank Institute of Technology, art shows and charity events. The centre hosts musical performances as well. It is the venue for a Kraftwerk concert in 2023.

The centre was selected as the hosting venue for the 2014 G-20 Australia summit.

The world’s largest and most influential HIV sciences conference was held at the centre from 23 to 26 July 2023.

=== Sports ===
Tenants
Brisbane Bullets	NBL	1998–2008, 2016–19
Queensland Firebirds	ANZ/NNL	2008–17
Gold Coast Blaze	NBL	2011–12

From 1998 until 2008, the BCEC Great Hall was the home of three times National Basketball League (NBL) champions the Brisbane Bullets. The Bullets moved from the previous home, the 13,500 seat Brisbane Entertainment Centre, due in part to dwindling crowds and the cost of playing out of the Boondall based stadium. During the 2011-12 NBL season the Gold Coast Blaze played two home games at the centre.

The Convention Centre was also the home to the Brisbane-based netball side the Queensland Firebirds from 2008 to 2017. The Firebirds were a foundation club of the Commonwealth Bank Trophy (CBT) in 1997 and played at the 2,700 seat Chandler Arena. When the CBT was retired in 2007 and the ANZ Championship took its place the Firebirds moved to the new championship and also moved into the larger Convention Centre, becoming the venue's second major tenant alongside the Bullets. The team moved home games to the Brisbane Entertainment Centre after the 2017 season.

== Awards ==
The Brisbane Convention and Exhibition Centre was recognized as the World's Best Convention Centre by the International Association of Congress Centres (AIPC) from 2016 to 2018.

== See also ==
- Queensland Cultural Centre
