= Sydney Heritage Fleet =

Maritime museum in New South Wales, Australia

- Location within Sydney
- Established: 1965; 61 years ago
- Location: Wharf 7, Darling Harbour, Pyrmont, Sydney, New South Wales, Australia. Heritage shipyard located at James Craig Road, Rozelle Bay.
- Coordinates: 33.8675°S 151.1985°E
- Type: Historic ship collection
- President: John Winning AM
- Owner: Sydney Maritime Museum Ltd.
- Public transit access: Pyrmont Bay light rail stop; Bus route 389
- Website: shf.org.au

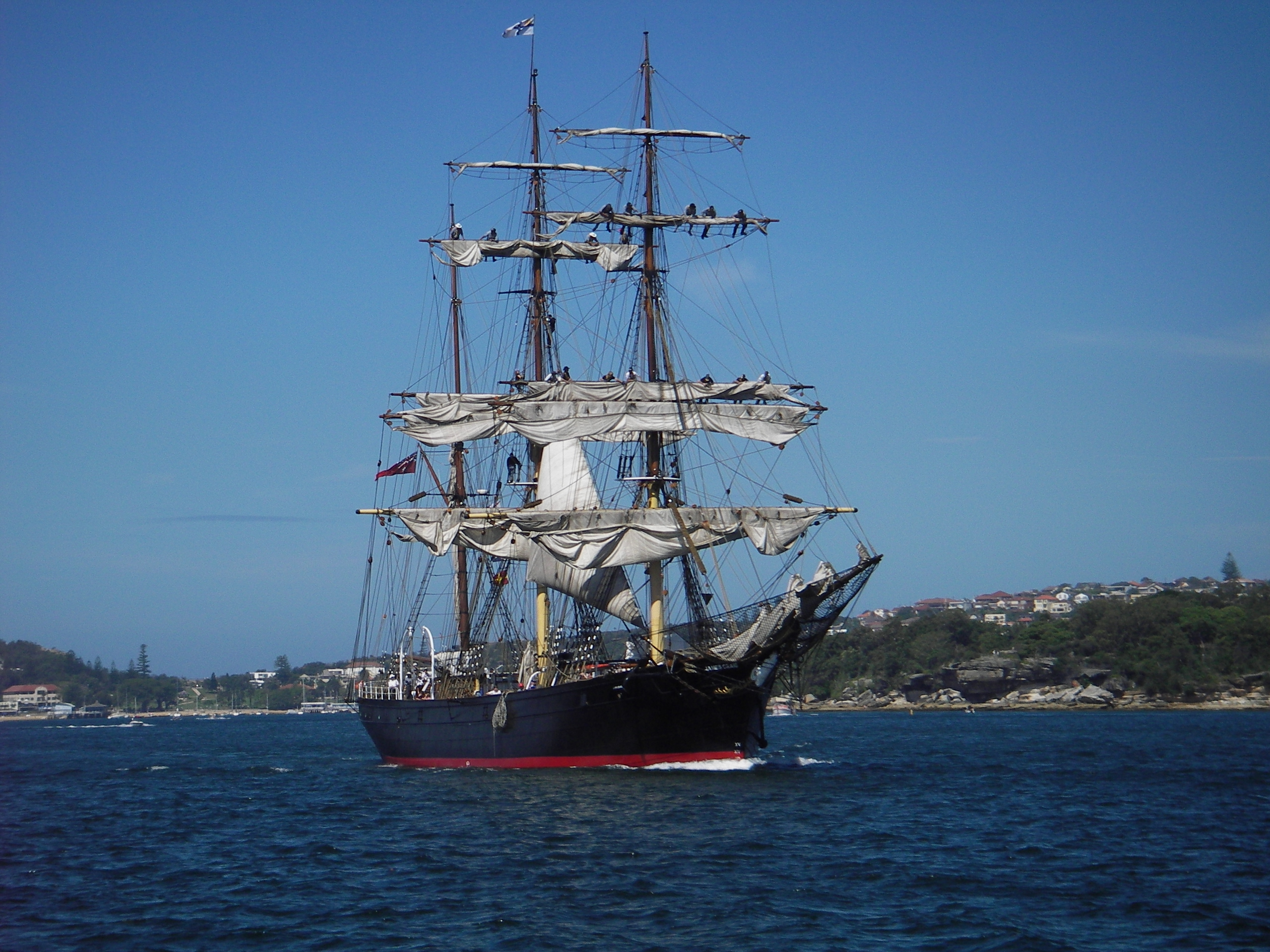
James Craig on Sydney Harbour

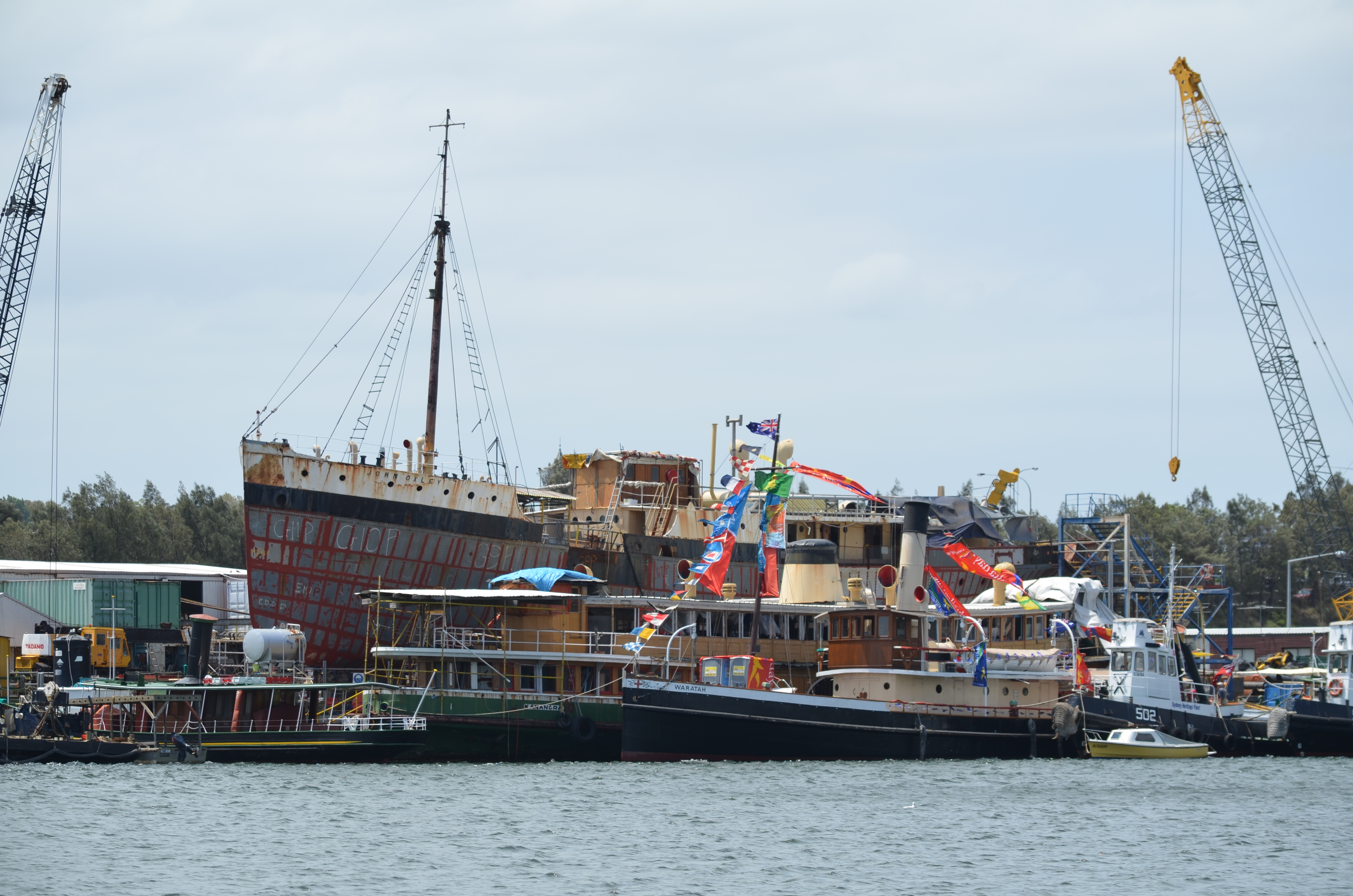
The Sydney Heritage Fleet restoration shipyard at Rozelle Bay, New South Wales. The vessels in the image include the steam tug Waratah, the harbour ferry Kanangra, and the pilot vessel John Oxley.

Sydney Heritage Fleet, is the trading name of Sydney Maritime Museum Ltd., a public company in Sydney, New South Wales, Australia.

The Fleet restores and operates a number of historic vessels including the barque James Craig. In 2003 the World Ship Trust awarded the James Craig its prestigious Maritime Heritage Award.

The offices, model workshop, some displayed boats, and the library are on Wharf 7 located in Darling Harbour. The James Craig is alongside the wharf. The fleet's shipyard is in Rozelle Bay.

== History ==
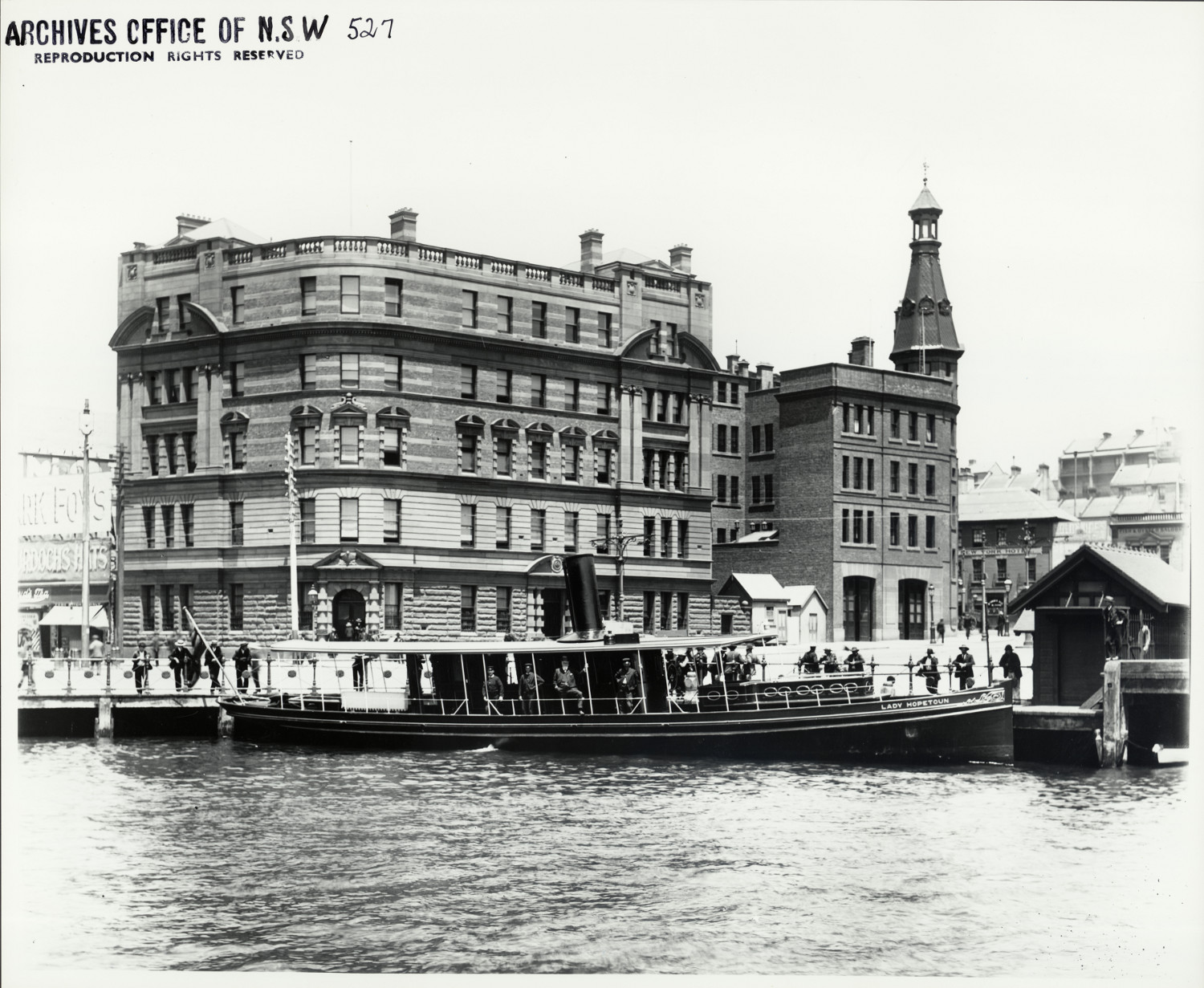
The Lady Hopetoun at Circular Quay c.1910

The Lady Hopetoun and Port Jackson Marine Steam Museum was the forerunner of the Sydney Heritage Fleet. In 1965 a group of enthusiasts under Warwick Turner formed the museum to preserve Sydney's 1902 VIP steam yacht Lady Hopetoun. The organisation later became known as the Sydney Maritime Museum Ltd. In 1998 the museum adopted the trading name Sydney Heritage Fleet, except for two years (2003/4) when 'Australian Heritage Fleet' was used. The Fleet now comprises 10 historic vessels which is amongst the largest collections of its type in the world.

On Sunday 18th February 2024 James Craig celebrated 150 years since launch, escorted by a flotilla of historic vessels from the Sydney Heritage Fleet including the flagship, Lady Hopetoun.

== Organisation ==
The Sydney Heritage Fleet is supported by a membership of 1,200 and 450 active volunteers who restore, operate and maintain the fleet and preserve traditional maritime methods and skills. In addition to the 10 primary vessels being operated or restored, the Fleet also has 55 small heritage boats and a significant collection of marine engines under restoration, as well as a collection of over fifty model ships. A comprehensive research library and archive which includes photographs, ships' plans, diaries, logs and journals is also maintained. Funding is through donations, membership subscriptions and income from vessel charters and tours.

== Operational vessels ==
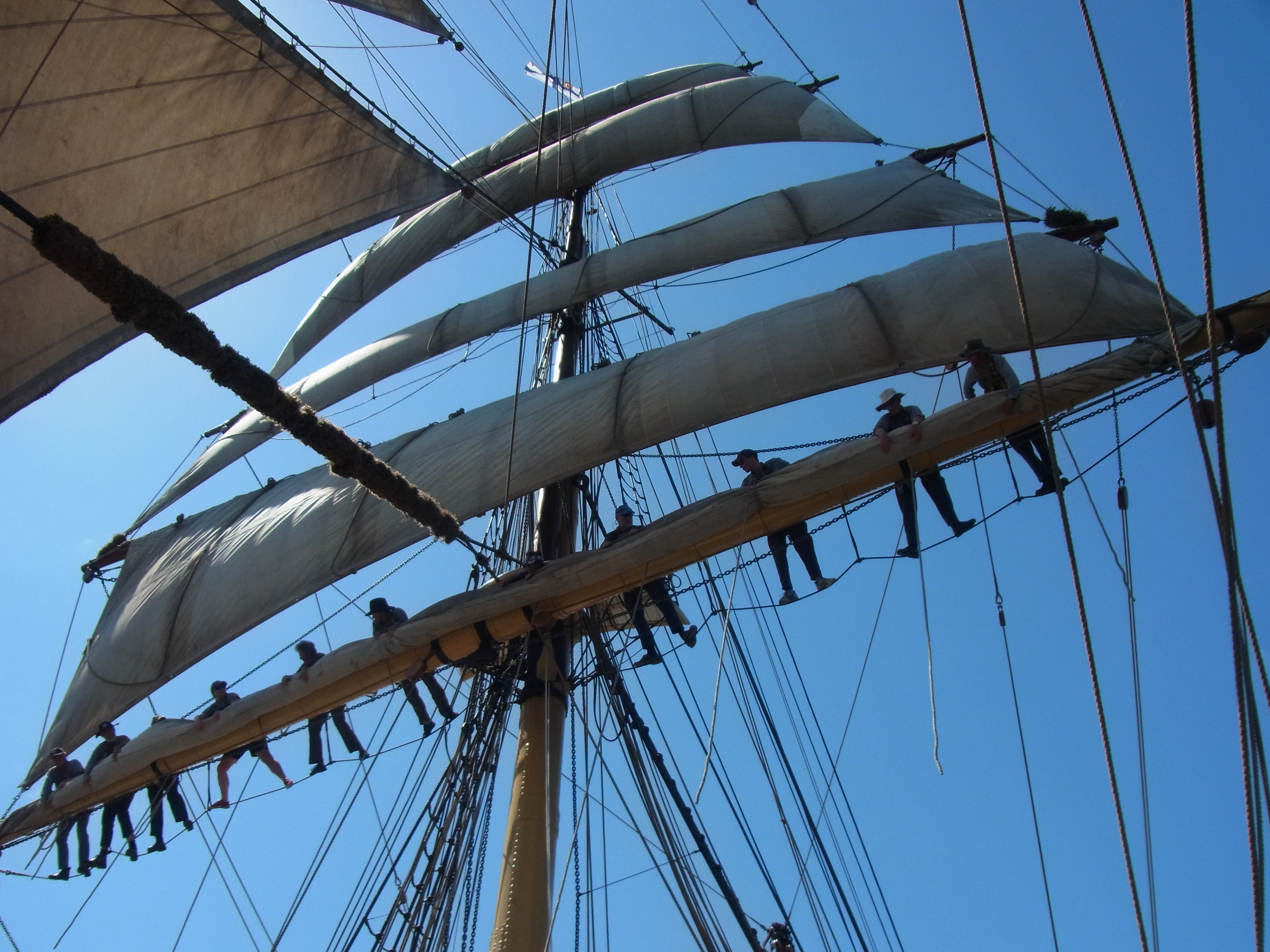
James Craig at sea under sail in May 2012

=== James Craig ===
James Craig is a three-masted, iron-hulled barque. Built in 1874 in Sunderland, England, by Bartram, Haswell, & Co., she was originally named Clan Macleod. She was employed carrying cargo around the world, and rounded Cape Horn 23 times in 26 years. In 1900 she was acquired by Mr J J Craig, renamed James Craig in 1905, and operated between New Zealand and Australia until 1911.

=== Waratah ===
Waratah is a coal fired tug and was launched at Cockatoo Island Dockyard, Sydney on 22 May 1902. Originally named Burunda, she was used to tow dredges and barges between the various ports along the NSW coast.

=== Lady Hopetoun ===
Lady Hopetoun is a 1902 VIP steam launch named after the Governor General of Australia's wife - the then Lady Hopetoun. She was built in the W. M. Ford yard at Berrys Bay, Sydney and launched on the tenth of April.

=== Boomerang ===
The 1903 schooner Boomerang was launched as the Bona on 24 September; it was designed by the noted Sydney naval architect Walter Reeks

=== Other vessels ===
- Protex, a 1908 inner-harbour motor launch
- Harman, a 1947 ex-Royal Australian Navy harbour workboat/passenger motor boat
- Berrima, a 1954 Botany Bay workboat/passenger motor boat
- Bronzewing, 1968 and Currawong, 1969, are Bronzewing-class harbour tugs (on loan from the Royal Australian Navy). They are used to berth and un-berth James Craig or to relocate the steam ships when not under steam.

== Vessels under restoration ==
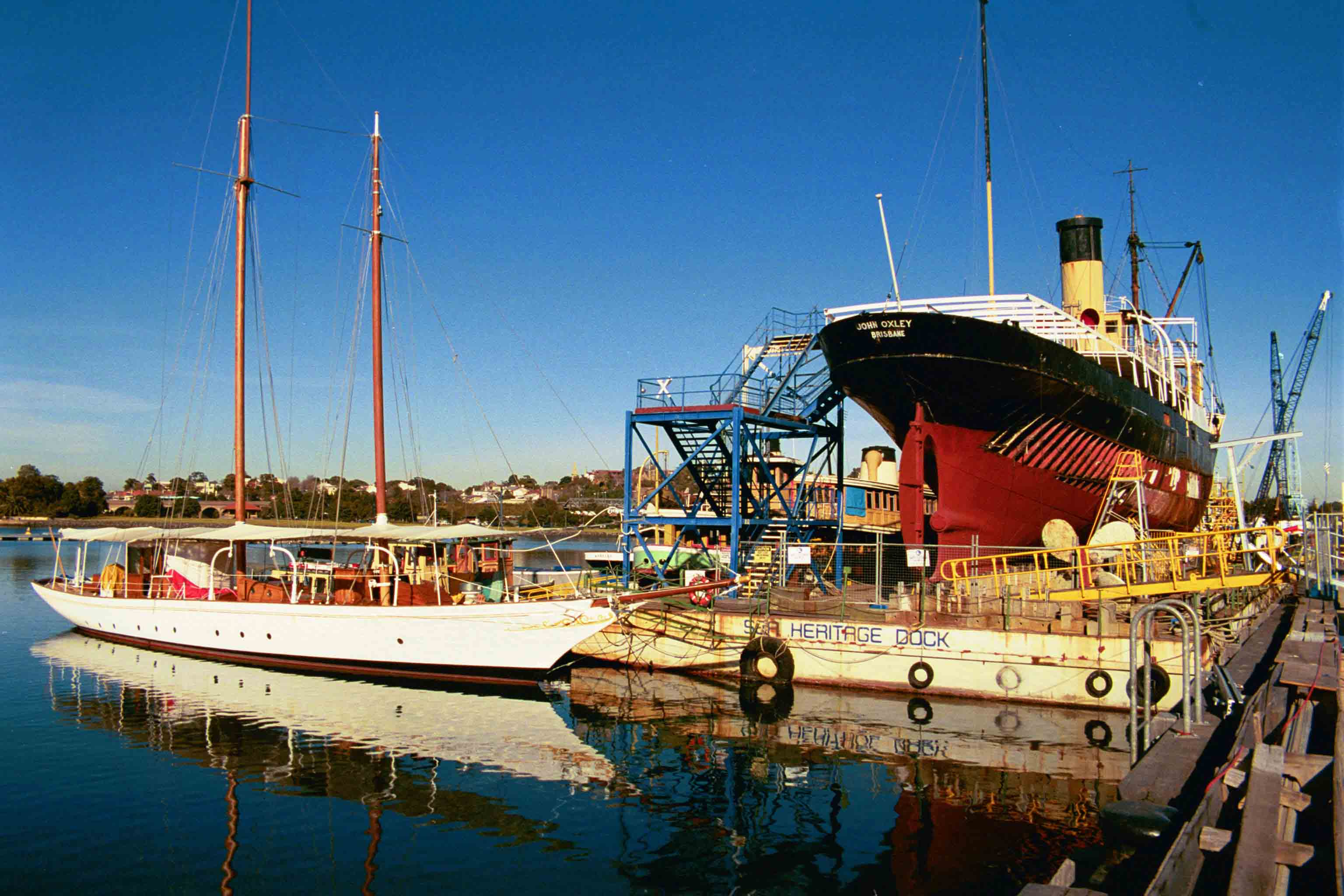
John Oxley with Boomerang in 2005

=== John Oxley ===
John Oxley is a steamship that previously served as a pilot boat and buoy tender. The ship was built in Scotland in 1927 for the Queensland state government.

John Oxley underwent extensive work in re-plating the hull whilst atop the floating dock that had been previously used to restore James Craig. In April 2022 she was refloated and Sydney Ferry Kanangra took her place on the floating dock.

=== Kanangra ===
Kanangra is a 1912 Sydney ferry, with a steel hull and wooden superstructure. She is currently undergoing restoration at the SHF shipyard in Rozelle.

=== Kookaburra II ===
A 1950s wooden speed boat.
