= Brisbane International Boat Show =

The Brisbane International Boat Show, the largest indoor only boat show in the Southern Hemisphere, is the flagship event of Marine Queensland.

The first show was held in 1961. The show was last held at Brisbane Convention & Exhibition Centre, Southbank, Brisbane from 25 to 28 August 2011, where attractions included a fashion show.

== See also ==
- List of festivals in Australia
- Australian Wooden Boat Festival
