= Australian Wooden Boat Festival =

Regular event in Tasmania, Australia

Coordinates: 42°53′07″S 147°20′04″E

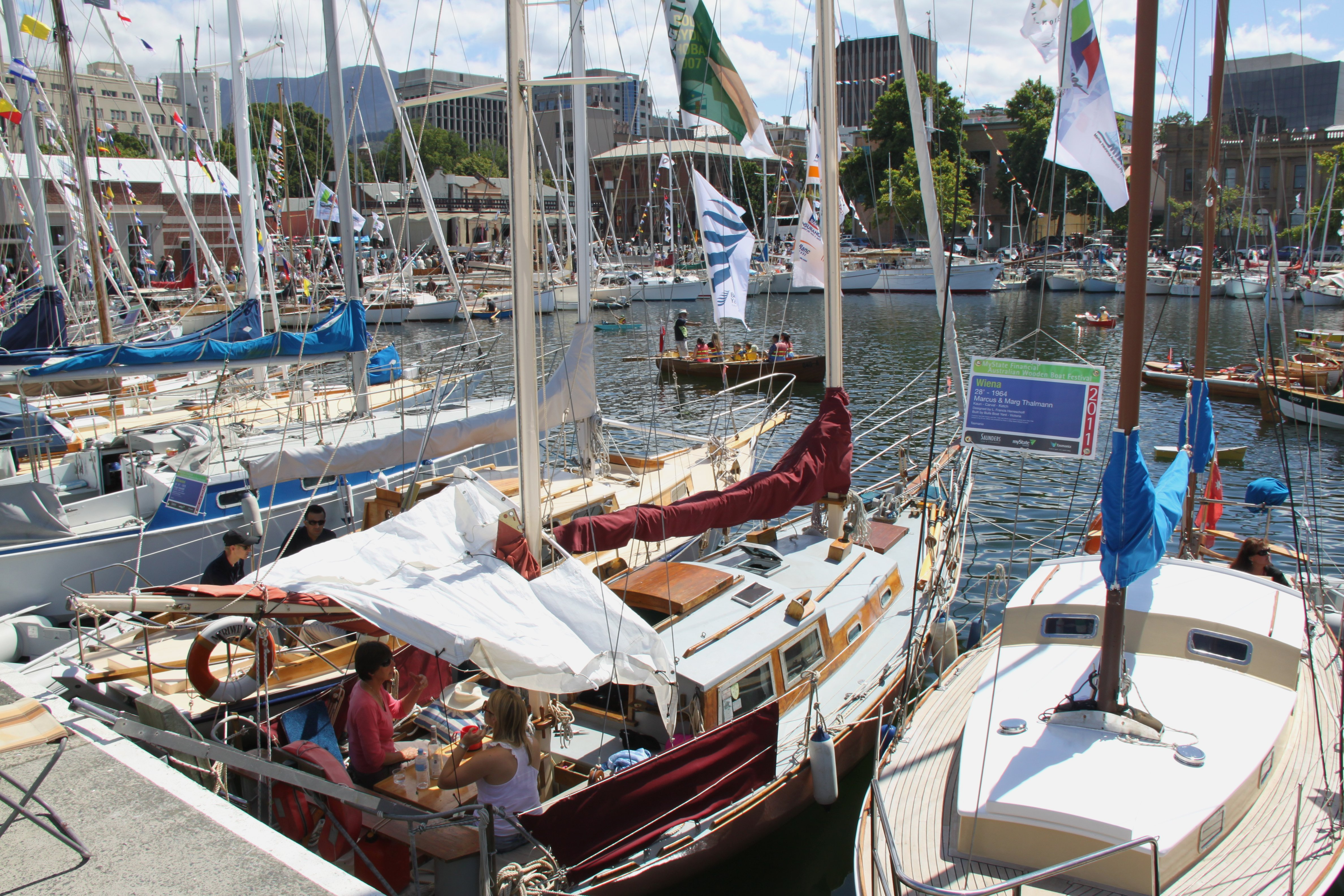
- Harbour scene from the 2011 Festival, Hobart, Tasmania
- Status: Active
- Genre: Festivals
- Frequency: Biennial
- Founded: 1994
- Website: australianwoodenboatfestival.com.au

The Australian Wooden Boat Festival (AWBF) is a biennial event held in Hobart, Tasmania, celebrating wooden boats. AWBF is held concurrently with the Royal Hobart Regatta. The festival welcomes wooden boats of all sizes including wooden canoes, kayaks and dinghies as well as yachts and tall ships.

== About ==
The festival is a celebration of Australia's maritime heritage and also showcases Tasmania's rich history of food and wines. It has a major economic benefit to the island state of Tasmania, with accommodation fully booked during the event.

AWBF is open only to boats constructed from timber*, and is widely regarded as the largest event of its type in the southern hemisphere. Indeed, it may be the world's largest boat festival open to wooden boats only.

== History ==
The first Australian Wooden Boat Festival was held in 1994 (180 boats).

- 2005 – 40,000 visitors (450 boats)
- 2011 – 160,000 visitors (550 boats)
- 2013 – 200,000 visitors (550 boats)
- 2015 – 200,000+ visitors (550 boats)
- 2017 – 200,000+ visitors (550 boats)

The 2021 festival was cancelled due to the COVID-19 pandemic in Australia and was deferred to 2023.

== Notes ==
* An exception is tall ships, as some large tall ships that visit during the festival have steel or iron hulls.

== 2017 ships ==
The Sail Training Vessel Tenacious was scheduled to be a feature vessel at AWBF 2017.

HM Bark Endeavour Replica is a major feature of each festival, though it did not attend in 2017. Other vessels that attend include the Julie Burgess, the last blue-gum fishing ketch, the HMS Lady Nelson replica, Windeward Bound and the James Craig.

== See also ==
- List of events in Tasmania
- List of festivals in Australia
- Brisbane International Boat Show
