= James Craig (barque) =

1874 iron-hulled barque

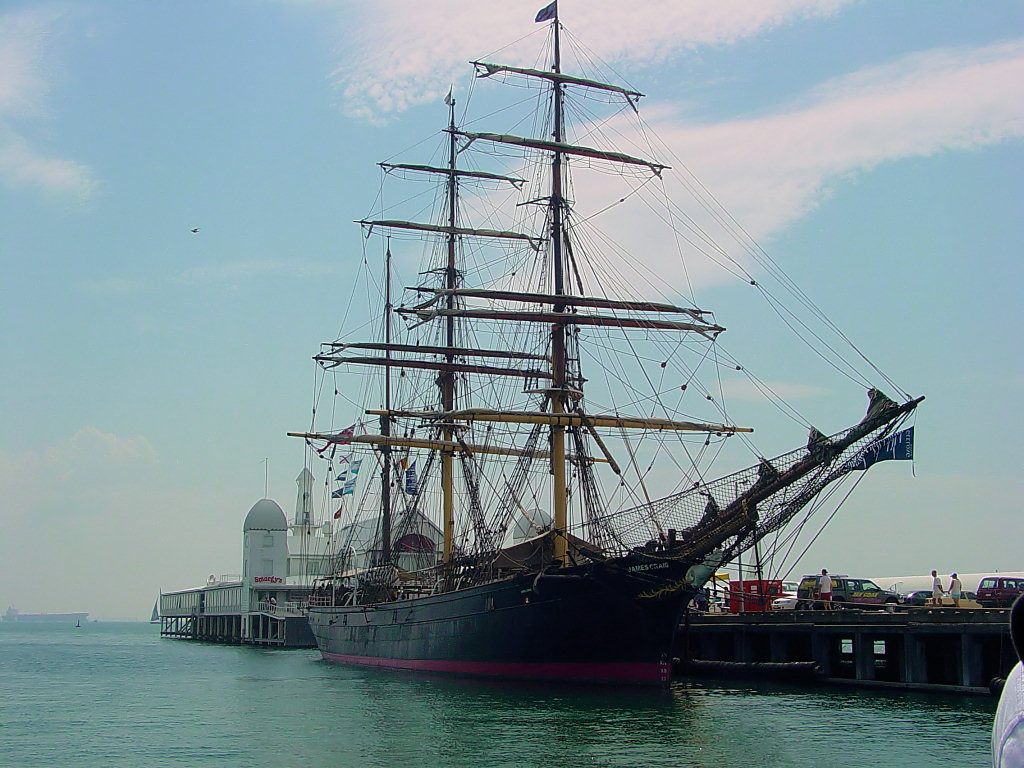
- James Craig in Geelong in 2006

History
- Name: Clan Macleod (1874-1905), James Craig (1905-)
- Owner: Mr. T. Dunlop, Glasgow, Scotland (1874-1883); Sir Roderick Cameron, Glasgow, Scotland (1883-1899); Mr. J. J. Craig, Auckland, New Zealand (1899-1911); British New Guinea Development Company (1911-1918); Henry Jones & Company(1918-1925); Catamaran Coal Mining Company (1925-1932 ); Lady Hopetoun and Port Jackson Marine Steam Museum (Sydney Maritime Museum) (1972-1998); Sydney Heritage Fleet (1998–2002); Australian Heritage Fleet (2002-2004); Sydney Heritage Fleet (2004-current)
- Builder: Bartram, Haswell & Co, Sunderland, England
- Cost: £11,375
- Yard number: 75
- Launched: 18 February 1874
- Maiden voyage: England to Peru
- In service: April,1874
- Renamed: James Craig, 1905
- Reclassified: Storage hulk 1911-1918; Coal lighter 1925-1932
- Reinstated: February 2001
- Home port: (United Kingdom of Great Britain and Ireland) Glasgow, United Kingdom (1874-1900), Auckland, New Zealand (1900-1911), (Australia) Hobart, Tasmania (1918-1925, 1972-1981); Sydney, Australia (since 1981)
- Identification: IMO number: 8676788; MMSI number: 503493000; Callsign: VJMR
- Status: Museum ship since 1972

General characteristics
- Type: Iron-hulled barque
- Tonnage: 671 gross tons
- Length: Hull:179.8 ft (54.8 m); LOA:229.6 ft (70.0 m)
- Beam: 31.3 ft (9.5 m)
- Height: 108.2 ft (33.0 m) at mainmast
- Draught: 12.3 ft (3.7 m)
- Depth of hold: 18 ft (5.5 m)
- Sail plan: Barque rig, 21 sails
- Speed: 14 knots (26 km/h; 16 mph)
- Capacity: 1,100 tons
- Complement: 16

James Craig is a three-masted, 19th-century iron-hulled barque restored and sailed by the Sydney Heritage Fleet, Sydney, Australia. She is one of only four pre-20th century barques in the world that still go regularly to sea. It was built as the Clan Macleod in 1874, and operated into the early 20th century. It was eventually left derelict in Tasmania for many decades before being restored by turn of the century, and in the 2000s operates as a Tall Ship.

== History ==
Built in 1874 in Sunderland, England, by Bartram, Haswell, & Co., she was originally named Clan Macleod. Characterized by her biographer Jeff Toghill as a typical "workhorse barque," she was intended to be operated as economically as possible while carrying general cargo worldwide - coal, salt, grain and cotton goods. In her world travels she rounded Cape Horn twenty-three times in the twenty-six years to 1900. In 1900 she was acquired by Mr J J Craig, renamed James Craig in 1905 and began to operate between ports in New Zealand and Australia. She made thirty-five voyages on the trans-Tasman run, to 1911.

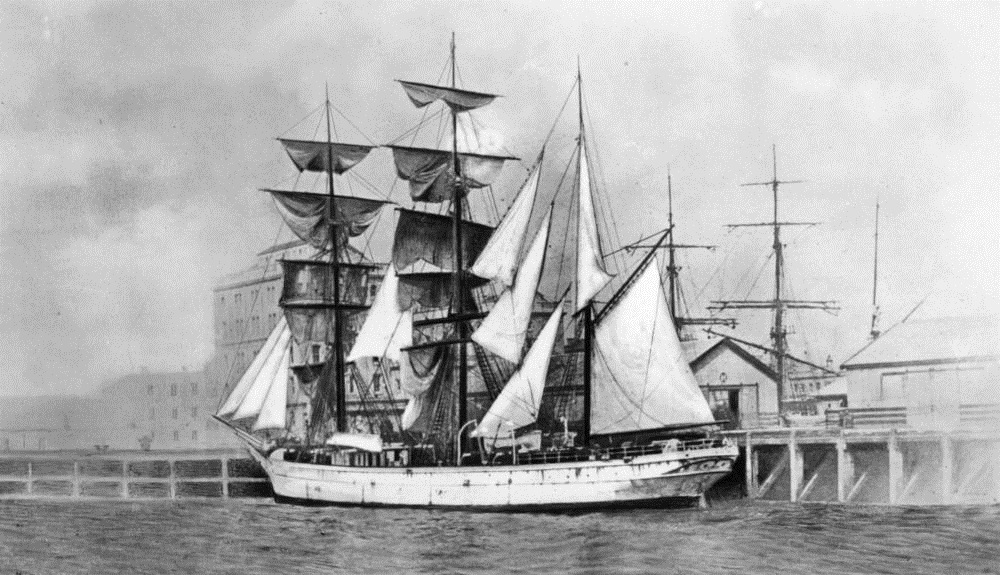
As Clan Macleod

Like many other sailing ships of her modest size, she fell victim to the advance of steamships in the first decade of the twentieth century and in 1911 she was converted to a storage hulk in Port Moresby. However, with the world-wide shortage of shipping caused by the First World War, she was re-rigged and refitted for trade in the Pacific in 1918. The reprieve for sailing ships was short-lived. With the exception of the grain trade, sailing ships were soon unable to compete with cargo-carrying steamships. In 1925 she was laid up again, then used as a hulk, until eventually being abandoned at Recherche Bay in Tasmania. To avoid her drifting and becoming a navigational hazard, a large hole was blown in her stern.

== Restoration ==
Part of the inspiration for preserving James Craig has been credited to Karl Kortum, then director of the San Francisco Maritime Museum who had also been involved in encouraging Australians to preserve the similar-sized barque Polly Woodside in Melbourne in 1962. Restoration of James Craig began in 1972, when volunteers from the Lady Hopetoun and Port Jackson Marine Steam Museum (now the Sydney Heritage Fleet) refloated her and towed her to Hobart for initial repairs. Brought back to Sydney under tow in 1981, her hull was placed on a submersible pontoon to allow work on the hull restoration to proceed. Over the next twenty-five years, the vessel was restored. Most of the hull was replaced, being repaired by both paid craftspeople and volunteers. The ship was relaunched in 1997, and restoration work was completed in 2001.

== Current situation ==
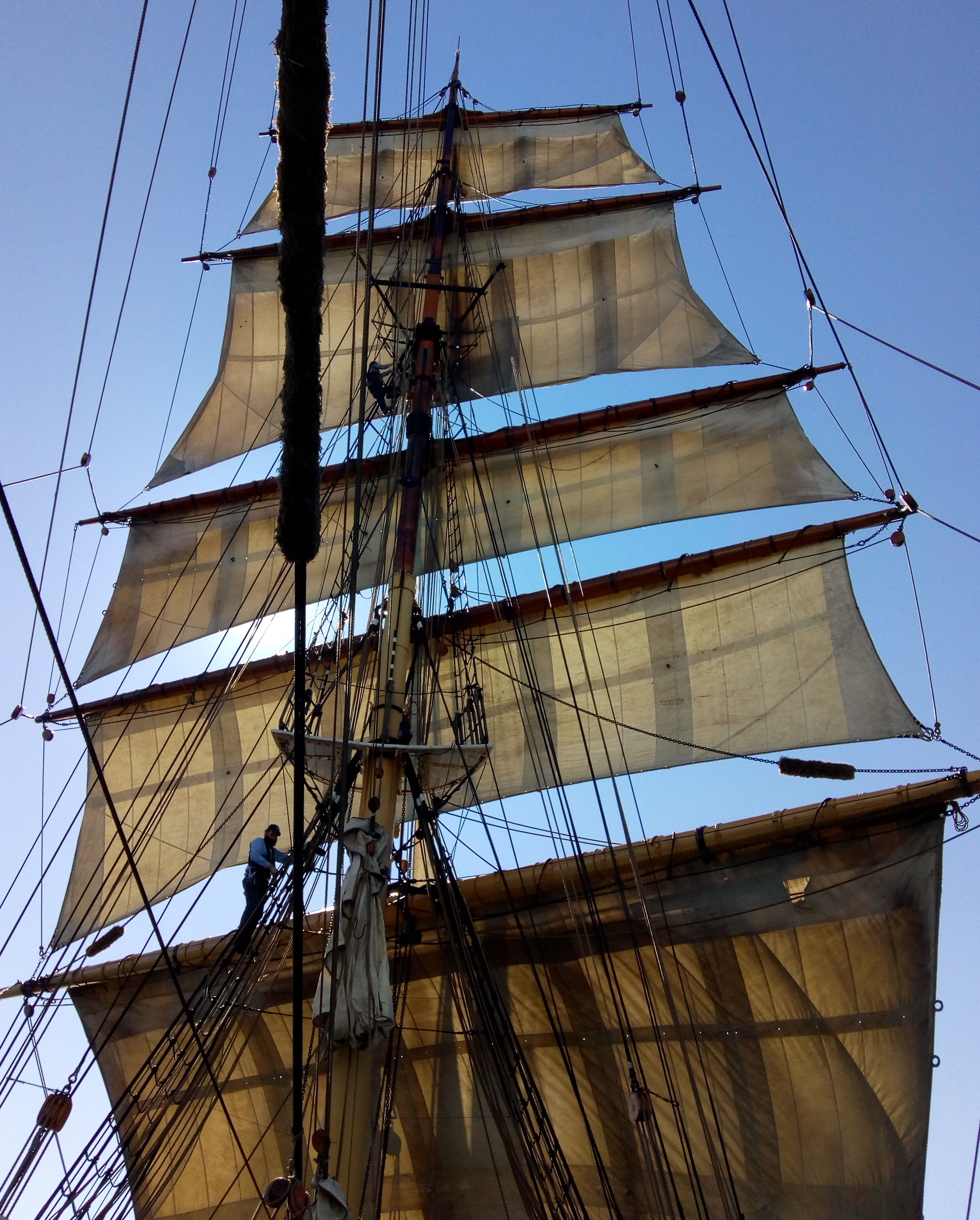
James Craig with sails set off Sydney Heads in July 2019

James Craig is currently berthed at Wharf 7 in Darling Harbour, near the Australian National Maritime Museum. She is open to the public, and takes passengers out sailing on Sydney Harbour and beyond. She is crewed by volunteers from the Sydney Heritage Fleet. Maintenance is by paid staff, contractors and volunteers. The cost of maintaining her is over $1 million a year; the ship relies on income generated from visitors, charters, events and regular day sails with up to 80 passengers.

The ship has made historic return voyages to Hobart (2005, 2009, 2011, 2013, 2017, 2019, 2023 and 2025) and to Port Philip (Melbourne and Williamstown) in 2006, 2008 and 2020. The voyages to Hobart coincide with the Wooden Boat Festival, one of the largest in the world.

In October 2013 James Craig participated in the International Fleet Review 2013 in Sydney, Australia.

== Historical value ==
James Craig is of exceptional historical value in that she is one of only four 19th-century barques in the world that still go regularly to sea. In 2003 the World Ship Trust awarded the James Craig a Maritime Heritage Award for authentic restoration. She is a working link to a time when such ships carried the bulk of global commerce in their holds. Thousands of similar ships plied the oceans in the 19th and early 20th centuries linking the old world, the new world, Asia and Oceania. She is sailed in the traditional 19th Century manner, mostly by volunteers. Her running rigging consists of 140 lines secured to belaying pins and spider bands. She achieved 11.3 knots on a return voyage from Melbourne on 9 February 2006.

== Engineering heritage award ==
James Craig received an Engineering Heritage National Marker from Engineers Australia as part of its Engineering Heritage Recognition Program.

== Gallery ==
James Craig during restoration at Darling Harbour in the 1980s

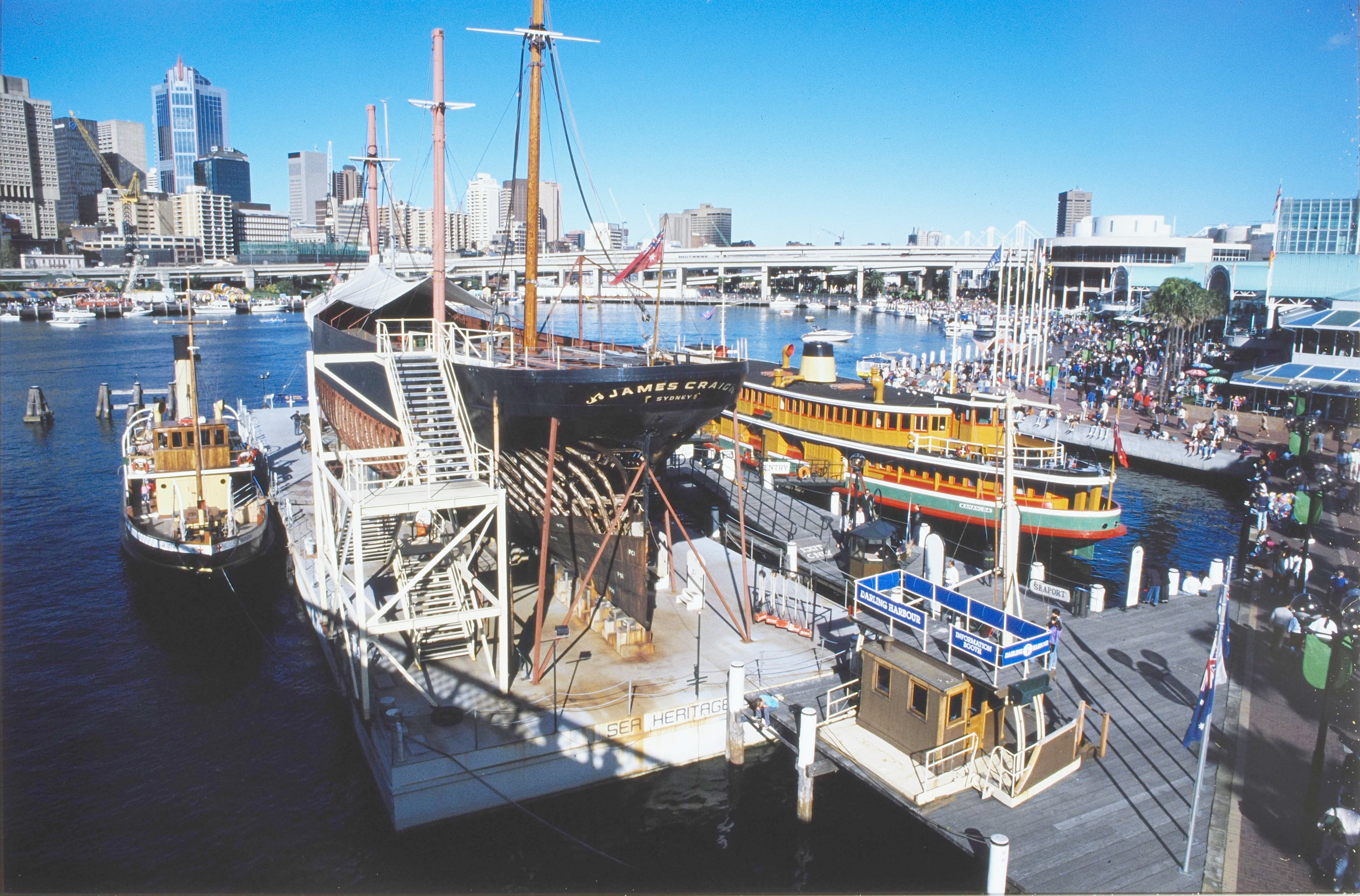
James Craig under restoration, 1990

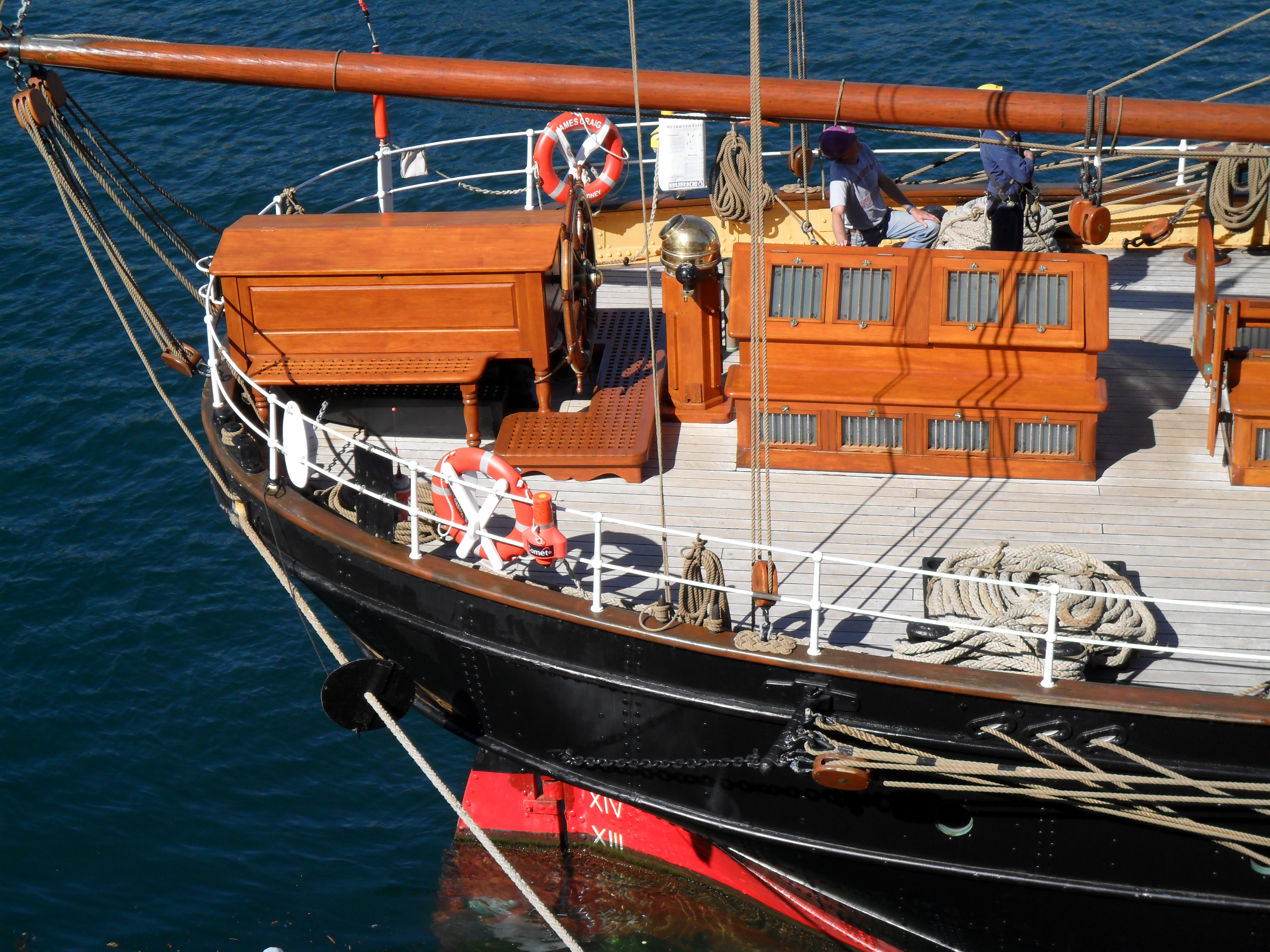

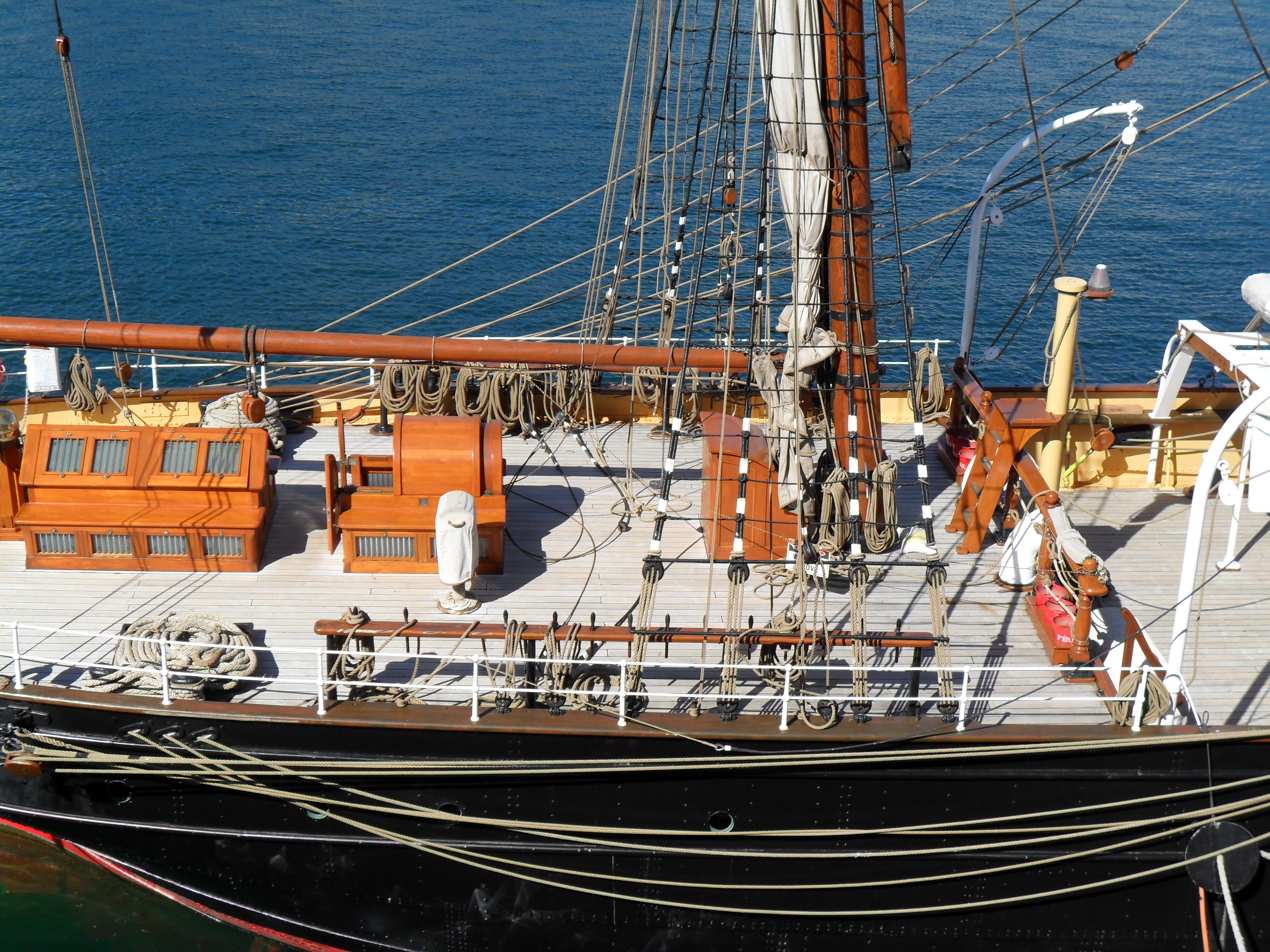

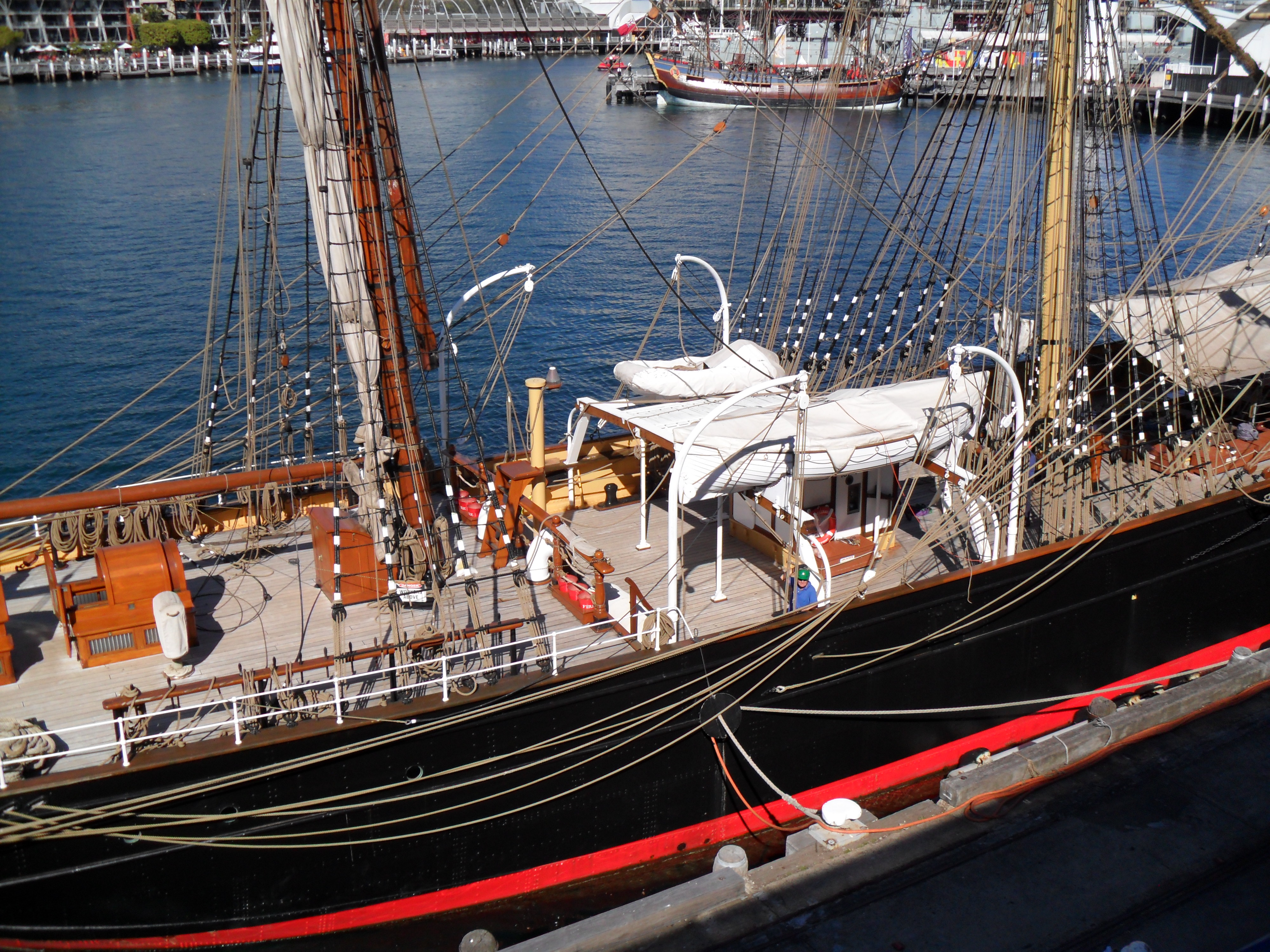

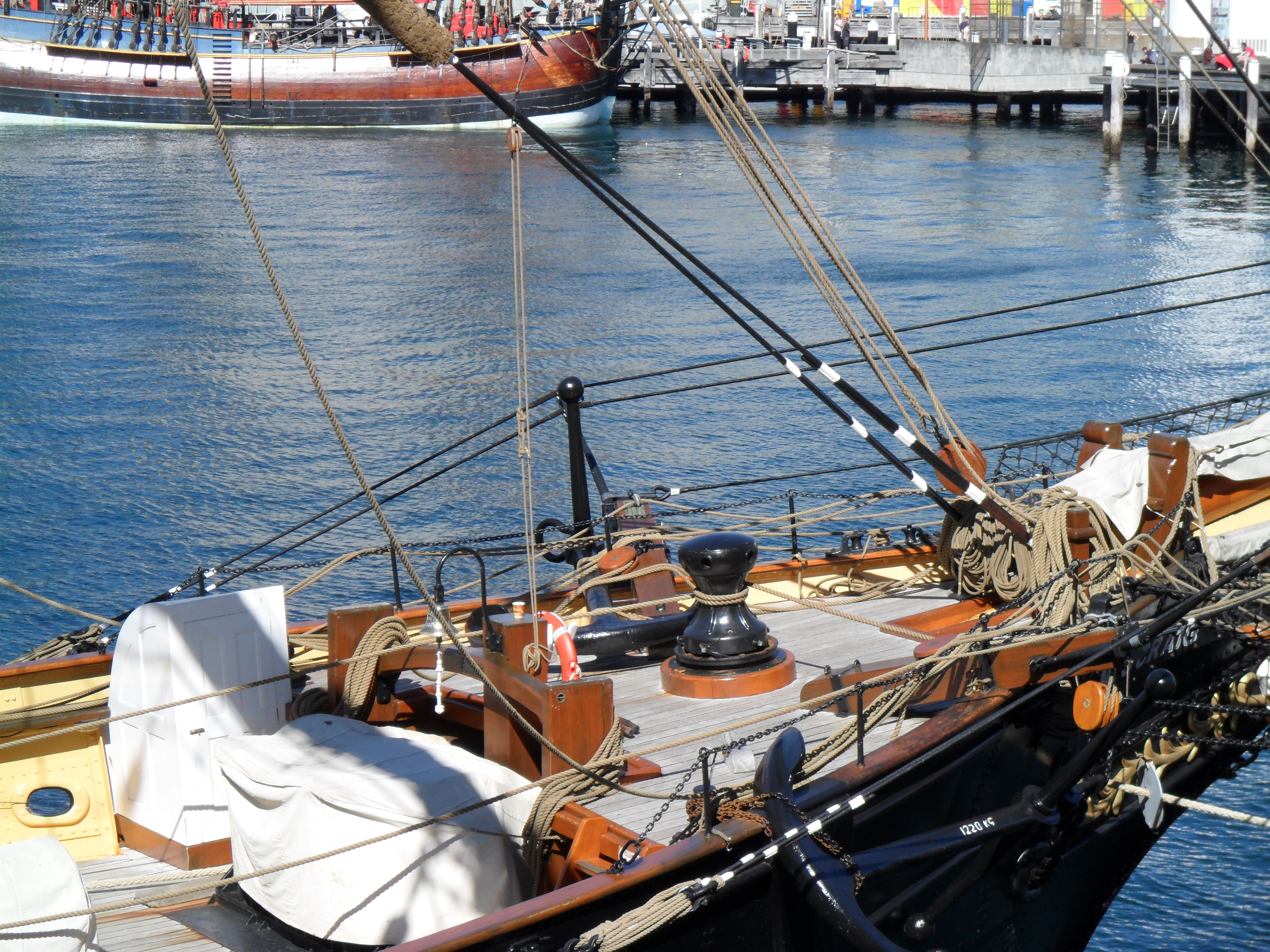

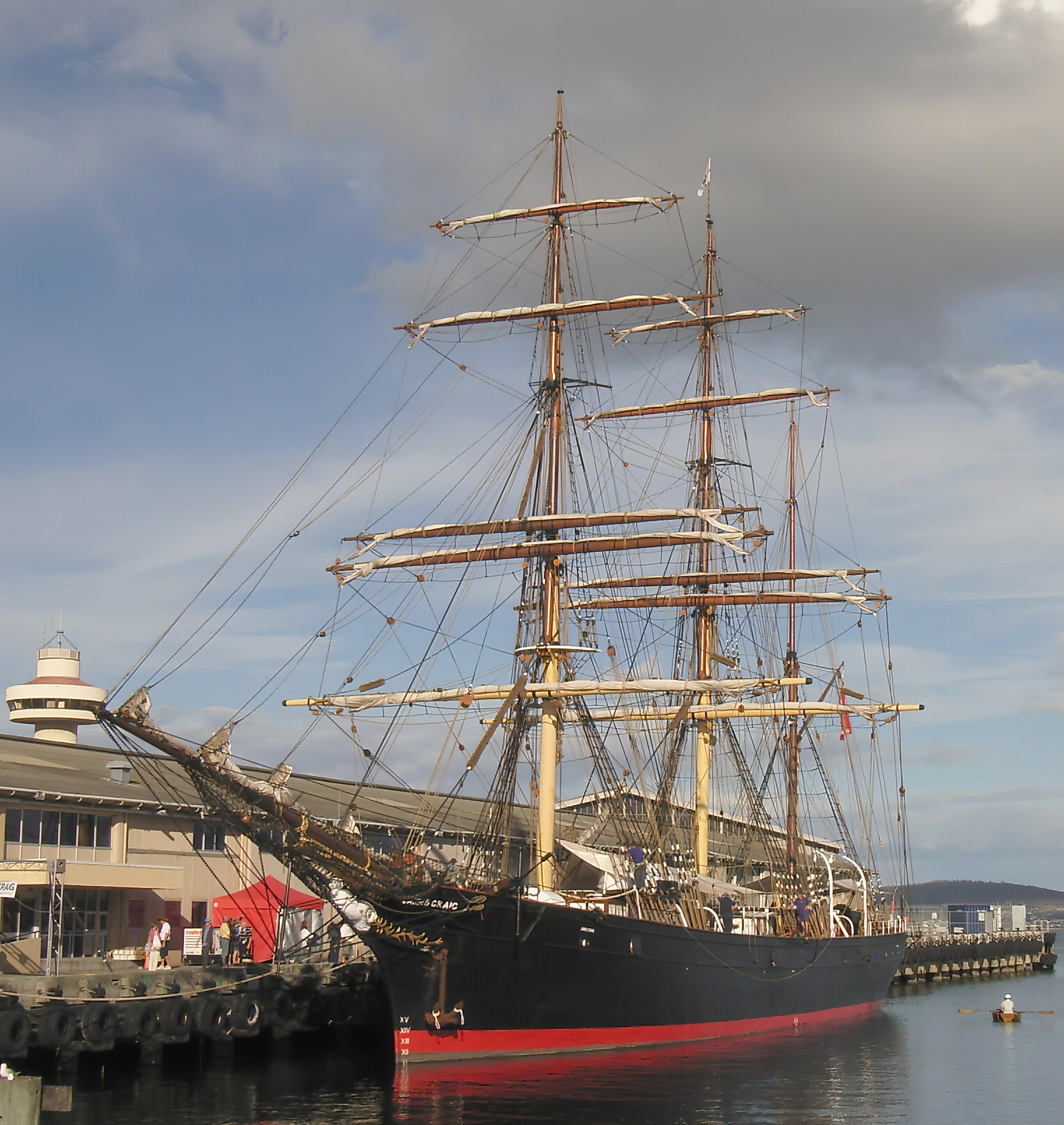
James Craig in Hobart, 2009

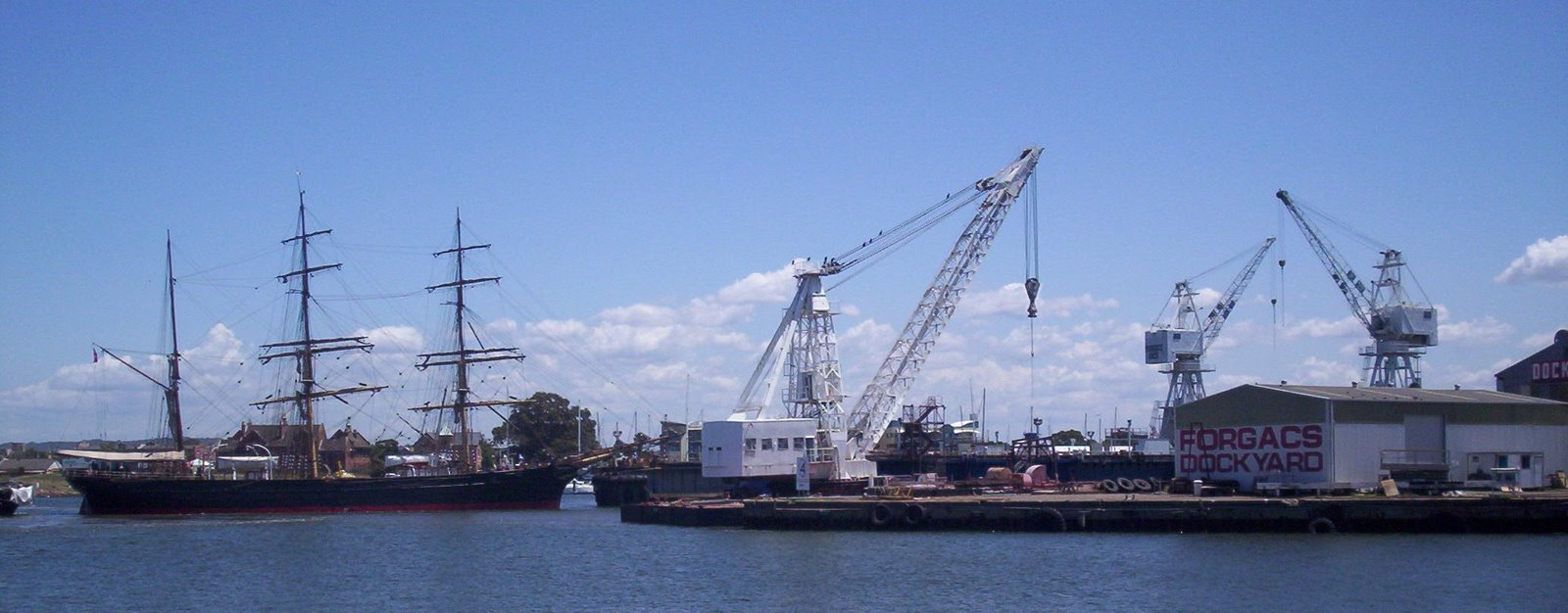
James Craig leaving Forgacs Dockyard, 2007

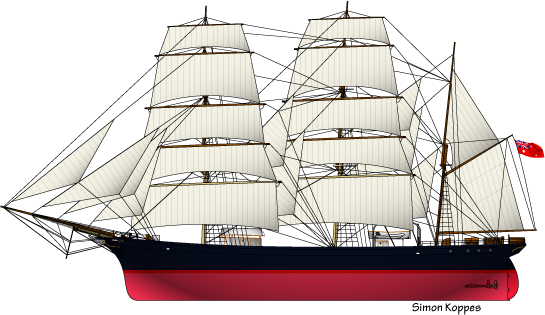
Line art of James Craig

== See also ==
- List of large sailing vessels
