= Brett Wheeler =

Australian basketball player (born 1971)

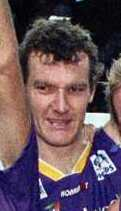
- Wheeler with the Sydney Kings in 2005

Personal information
- Born: 21 November 1971 (age 54) Adelaide, South Australia, Australia
- Listed height: 208 cm (6 ft 10 in)
- Listed weight: 102 kg (225 lb)

Career information
- Playing career: 1991–2007
- Position: Centre / power forward

Career history
- 1991–1997: Adelaide 36ers
- 1998: South East Melbourne Magic
- 1999–2002: Victoria Titans
- 2002–2003: Perth Wildcats
- 2003–2006: Sydney Kings
- 2006–2007: Adelaide 36ers

Career highlights
- 2× NBL champion (2004, 2005)

Brett Wheeler (born 21 November 1971) is an Australian former professional basketball player in the National Basketball League. A 6-foot-10-inch (208 cm) tall Centre or Power forward, Wheeler played for the Adelaide 36ers, South East Melbourne Magic, Victoria Titans, Perth Wildcats and the Sydney Kings during his 17-year career, appearing in a record 8 NBL Grand Finals (at least once with each team) and won the 2003–04 and 2004–05 NBL championship with the Kings. He also represented Australia at international level during his career.

== Career ==
Wheeler played his junior basketball with the Noarlunga Tigers in southern Adelaide, began his NBL career as a lanky 19 year old with the Adelaide 36ers in 1991 as backup to the team's Boomers centre Mark Bradtke. He made his NBL debut for Adelaide, playing 7:46 and scoring 1 point in a 93–90 loss to the Perth Wildcats at the Perth Entertainment Centre on 29 June 1991. His first season saw the 36ers reach the Semi-Finals where they were defeated by Perth Wildcats who would go on to win their first NBL title that season. 1991 was also the 36ers final season at the 3,000 seat Apollo Stadium before moving into the 8,000 seat Clipsal Powerhouse in 1992. Wheeler became the first choice centre for the 36ers in 1993 when Bradtke moved to the Melbourne Tigers.

Brett Wheeler played in his only Grand Final series for the 36ers under the coaching of Mike Dunlap in 1994. Unfortunately though in what would be a pattern through his career, the 1994 36ers, including players such as Mark Davis, Robert Rose, Phil Smyth, Mike McKay, Scott Ninnis and Brett Maher, went down 2–0 in the GF to the North Melbourne Giants.

After moving to a bench role in 1994, Wheeler again became the 36ers starting centre in 1995 and remained there until the end of 1997. He actually became the starting centre almost by accident. In 1995 he was set to play centre and power forward off the bench with 6'11" Willie Simmons to be the starting centre. However, only a couple of games into the season Mike McKay took a charge and when falling back, fell on Simmons' leg which forced him out for the season after needing a knee reconstruction. Wheeler then moved into the starting role and began to play some of the best basketball of his career to that point.

He stayed with the 36ers until moving to the Brian Goorjian coached South East Melbourne Magic in 1998 to replace 7 ft 0 in (213 cm) tall centre Chris Anstey who had left to join the Dallas Mavericks in the NBA. Unfortunately for Wheeler who never won a championship in his time with Adelaide (losing the 1994 GF and two semi-final series in 1991 and 1995), while the Magic made it to the 1998 Grand Final series, they were defeated 2–0 in the best of three series by none other than the Adelaide 36ers.

Following the merger of the Magic and their cross-Melbourne rivals the North Melbourne Giants at the end of the 1998 season, the Victoria Titans were born and due to the presence of 7 ft 0 in (213 cm) tall centre Ben Pepper who came from the Giants, Wheeler often started at power forward giving the Titans arguably the largest front court in the league at the time. He would stay with the Titans until the end of 2002, helping the club to the NBL grand final series in both the 1998–99 and 1999–2000 seasons. The 1998–99 title loss was again to the 36ers while in the 1999–2000 season, the Titans lost to the Perth Wildcats.

As a measure of his development as a player at the time, Wheeler (now a 10-year veteran of the league) kept his starting spot for the Titans in 2000–01 despite the team signing Chris Anstey upon his return to the NBL after three seasons in the NBA with the Dallas Mavericks and Chicago Bulls.

Following the 2001–02 season, Wheeler was on the move again, this time joining the Perth Wildcats for the 2002–03 season where he would play in his 4th losing grand final series, this time going down to the Sydney Kings. He would finally get to win the NBL championship after moving to the defending champion Kings the next season, winning both the 2003–04 and 2004–05 championships with the Kings under the coaching of his former Magic and Titans coach Brian Goorjian.

After losing his 5th grand final series to the Melbourne Tigers in 2005–06, Wheeler moved back to Adelaide for the 2006–07 season before retiring from the NBL at age 36 having played 448 games over 17 seasons.

Brett Wheeler holds the record for most points in an NBL game without scoring a field goal. He scored 9 points on 9-of-10 free throws for the Magic against Townsville on 27 February 1998. He also holds the record for the most appearances in the NBL Grand Final with 8.

== International ==
Wheeler's play in the NBL also saw him selected to play for the Australian Boomers 19 times. He made his Australian team debut at the Clipsal Powerhouse in Adelaide on 7 March 1995 in Game 1 of a 5 games series between the Boomers and the visiting Magic Johnson All-Stars.

== Honour roll ==
NBL career:	1991–2007
NBL Championships:	2 (2003/04, 2004/05)
NBL Grand Final appearances:	8 (1994, 1998, 1998/99, 1999/2000, 2002/03, 2003/04, 2004/05, 2005/06)
NBL Finals appearances:	14 (1991, 1993, 1994, 1995, 1996, 1998, 1998/99, 1999/2000, 2000/01, 2001/02, 2002/03, 2003/04, 2004/05, 2005/06)

== NBL career stats ==
Games:	448 (154 Ade, 34 SEM, 126 Vic, 34 Per, 100 Syd)
Rebounds:	6.0 pg
Points:	3,809 (8.5 pg)
Free Throws:	998 / 1,536 (65.0%)
Field goals:	1,404 / 2,591 (54.2%)
3 Points:	1 / 5 (20.0%)
Steals:	0.5 pg
Assists:	0.6 pg
Blocks:	0.6 pg
