= Robert Rose (basketball) =

American-Australian basketball player

Personal information
- Born: 27 December 1964 (age 61) Rochester, New York, U.S.
- Listed height: 196 cm (6 ft 5 in)
- Listed weight: 96 kg (212 lb)

Career information
- High school: Cardinal Mooney (Greece, New York)
- College: George Mason (1982–1986)
- NBA draft: 1986: undrafted
- Playing career: 1986–2006
- Position: Shooting guard
- Number: 42, 21

Career history
- 1986–1987: Mississippi Jets
- 1987: Rhode Island Gulls
- 1988–1989: Wichita Falls Texans
- 1989: Los Angeles Clippers
- 1990: Purefoods TJ Hotdogs
- 1990–1991: Wichita Falls Texans
- 1991–1992: Quad City Thunder
- 1992–1993: South East Melbourne Magic
- 1994–1995: Adelaide 36ers
- 1995–1996: Maccabi Ramat Gan
- 1996–1998: Canberra Cannons
- 1998–2006: Townsville Crocodiles
- 2006: Cairns Taipans

Career highlights
- NBL champion (1992); 2× NBL Most Valuable Player (1993, 2001); NBL All-Star Game MVP (1995); 5× All-NBL First Team (1993, 1995–1997, 2001); 3× All-NBL Second Team (1994, 1999, 2002); 3× All-NBL Third Team (1992, 2000, 2003); No. 21 retired by Townsville Crocodiles; NBL's 25th Anniversary Team; First-team All-CAA (1986); Second-team All-ECAC South (1985)
- Stats at NBA.com
- Stats at Basketball Reference

Robert Paul Rose (born 27 December 1964) is an American-Australian retired professional basketball player. He played the majority of his career in the Australian National Basketball League (NBL), where he won a championship with the South East Melbourne Magic in 1992 and was a two-time NBL Most Valuable Player in 1993 and 2001. Rose was nicknamed "Australia's Michael Jordan" due to his clutch shooting and defensive abilities.

== Early life ==
Rose was born in Rochester, New York, as the youngest of nine children. He grew up as a fan of the Cincinnati Reds and dreamt of becoming a professional baseball player as a child. Rose attended Cardinal Mooney High School where he led the Cardinals basketball team to the Section V Class AAA title as a senior.

Rose had planned to attend an NCAA Division III school to play basketball when he was noticed by Bob Ward, a volunteer assistant with the George Mason Patriots who was at home for Christmas break in December 1981. Ward convinced Patriots head coach Rick Barnes to watch Rose during the sectional finals; Ward said that Barnes "really liked him."

== College career ==
Rose played collegiately for the George Mason Patriots from 1982 to 1986. He was destined to redshirt his freshman season but he earned a starting spot on the team before the season began. During his senior season, he led the Patriots to their first National Invitational Tournament (NIT). Rose was a second-team All-ECAC South selection in 1985 and a first-team All-CAA selection in 1986. He ranks in the top 10 of points (9th), rebounds (9th), steals (3rd), blocks (6th), field goal percentage (4th), free throw percentage (8th) and free throws made (9th) in Patriots program history.

== Professional career ==
Rose played 2 games in the NBA for the Los Angeles Clippers in the 1988-89 season after signing a 10-day contract. He was invited to join the team by general manager Elgin Baylor to replace Reggie Williams after an injury. Rose played a total of three minutes and had two rebounds.

Rose later played in the Philippine Basketball Association for the Purefoods Hotdogs in the 1990 Reinforced Conference and helped the team win their first ever championship despite getting injured in the final game. He had a brief stint in Belgium during the 1991–92 season. He began his NBL career in 1992 with the South-East Melbourne Magic, leading his team to the championship - which would prove to be his only one. The next year Rose would average 18.6 points, 7.5 rebounds and 8.5 assists per game on his way to the National Basketball League MVP.

Rose signed to play with the Adelaide 36ers for the 1994 NBL season under a new 36ers coach, former NCAA coach Mike Dunlap. Rose combined with Mark Davis, Mike McKay, Phil Smyth and Brett Maher to lead the team to the 1994 NBL Grand Final Series where they were defeated by the North Melbourne Giants in two games (Rose averaged 32 points for the series), as well as the 1995 Semi-Finals against the Perth Wildcats. During his time in Adelaide Rose won the club's 1994 and 1995 MVP awards and was selected to the 1995 NBL All-Star Game played at Adelaide's Clipsal Powerhouse, where he won the game MVP award.

Rose played for Maccabi Ramat Gan of the Israeli Basketball Premier League during the 1995–96 season.

Rose then signed for a three-year stint with the Canberra Cannons where he was selected to the All NBL First Team in both 1996 and 1997. He led the Cannons to the Semi Finals in 1996 and Elimination Finals in 1997 before just missing out on a play-off berth in 1998. He then signed with the struggling North Queensland team of the Townsville Crocodiles. Rose would turn the franchise around captaining them to the semi-finals and grand final in the 1999–2000 and 2000–01 seasons. Rose capped off his team's performance by winning his second league MVP award. However the Crocodiles would be defeated by the Wollongong Hawks in the deciding game three of the grand final series.

After the 2005–06 season, at age 42, the Crocodiles decided not to renew Rose's contract. He then signed with North Queensland rivals the Cairns Taipans for the 2006–07 season before retiring in December 2006 having played in 472 NBL games.

== Personal life ==
Rose owned a sports card shop in Melbourne and had a collection of 50,000 cards in 1996.

== Career statistics ==
Legend
GP	Games played	GS	Games started	MPG	Minutes per game
FG%	Field goal percentage	3P%	3-point field goal percentage	FT%	Free throw percentage
RPG	Rebounds per game	APG	Assists per game	SPG	Steals per game
BPG	Blocks per game	PPG	Points per game	**Bold**	Career high

=== NBA ===
==== Regular season ====
Year	Team	GP	GS	MPG	FG%	3P%	FT%	RPG	APG	SPG	BPG	PPG
1988–89	L.A. Clippers	2	0	1.5	.000	–	–	1.0	.0	.0	.0	.0

=== NBL ===
Games:	472
Points:	9,080 (19.2 pg)
Assists:	2,454 (5.1 pg)
Steals:	817 (1.7 pg)
Turnovers:	1,409 (2.9 pg)
