= Mark Nash =

Mark Nash may refer to:

- Mark Nash (announcer) (born 1977), Canadian wrestling announcer
- Mark Nash (basketball) (born 1976), Australian basketball player
- Mark Nash (murderer) (born c. 1972), Irish serial killer
- Mark Nash (musician) (fl. 1980s–2020s), drummer for Christian rock band PFR
