= Brett Maher =

Brett Maher may refer to:

- Brett Maher (basketball) (born 1973), Australian basketball player
- Brett Maher (gridiron football) (born 1989), American football placekicker
