= Adelaide 36ers =

Australian professional basketball team

- 2026–27 Adelaide 36ers season
- League: NBL
- Founded: 1982; 44 years ago
- History: Adelaide City Eagles; 1982; Adelaide 36ers 1983–present
- Arena: Adelaide Entertainment Centre
- Capacity: 10,000
- Location: Hindmarsh, South Australia
- Team colors: Navy, red, gold, white
- CEO: Nic Barbato
- General manager: Matt Weston
- Head coach: Trevor Gleeson
- Team captain: Bryce Cotton
- Ownership: Grant Kelley
- Championships: 4 (1986, 1998, 1999, 2002)
- Retired numbers: 4 (4, 5, 15, 33)
- Website: 36ers.com
Home	Away	City

The Adelaide 36ers are an Australian professional men's basketball team in the National Basketball League (NBL). The 36ers are the only team in the league representing the state of South Australia and are based in the state's capital of Adelaide. The club was originally called the Adelaide City Eagles when they joined the NBL in 1982, but changed their name to the 36ers the following year. The 36ers nickname comes from the fact that the Colony of South Australia was officially proclaimed on 28 December 1836. Since 2019, the 36ers play their home games at the Adelaide Entertainment Centre.

The 36ers' tally of four championships is equal with the New Zealand Breakers, and fourth only behind the Sydney Kings (five), Melbourne United (six) and Perth Wildcats (ten) as the most by any club in the NBL's history.

As of 2024, the 36ers are the only NBL team to defeat a team from the National Basketball Association (NBA), having beaten the Phoenix Suns 134–124 in a preseason game on 2 October 2022.

== History ==
=== 1980s: The Golden Era ===
The demise of the Forestville Eagles at the end of the 1981 NBL season had left the West Adelaide Bearcats as Adelaide's only representative in the NBL, and so the Basketball Association of South Australia formed a composite team representing all the state league teams (not the Bearcats). This team was known as the Adelaide City Eagles when they joined the NBL in 1982. Mike Osborne was appointed as team coach, Chris Stirling was captain and the team, like West Adelaide, played out of the 3,000 seat Apollo Stadium. The Eagles performed well in their first season but missed the playoffs finishing in 7th place on the ladder with a 15–11 record. The championship was won that year by the West Adelaide Bearcats who featured future 36ers' in 1982 NBL MVP Al Green, Moscow Olympian Peter Ali and veteran guard Ray Wood.

The Adelaide City Eagles changed their name after the 1982 season to the Adelaide 36ers to reflect on the history of South Australia's proclamation in 1836. Mike Osborne continued as head coach while David Winslow was named team captain. The 36ers once again missed the NBL playoffs in 1983 finishing 6th on the ladder with an 11–11 record.

The 1984 NBL season saw the 36ers reach the NBL finals for the first time, finishing the regular season in 3rd place in the Western Division with a 16–7 record. The team lost their Elimination Final to the Nunawading Spectres 108–101. Mike Osborne was subsequently released as head coach.

Following the 1984 season, the West Adelaide Bearcats merged with the 36ers to form one 'Adelaide' team in the NBL, with the Bearcats providing six players to the roster.

Former Australian Boomer and 1964 Olympic representative Ken Cole was signed as coach of the Adelaide 36ers for the 1985 NBL season. Under Cole (who had previously coached in South Australia in the 1970s), the 36ers became one of the league's premier teams. Import players including 6 ft 9 in (206 cm) centre Bill Jones, New York-born combo guard Al Green (who had been drafted by the San Diego Chargers as a Defensive back in the 1979 NFL draft despite not playing football) and an NBL rookie in 24-year-old Power forward from Philadelphia, Mark Davis who joined the team 5 games into the season after dominating the local league with South Adelaide, combined with local players Darryl Pearce, team captain Peter Ali, young gun Mike McKay, and veteran Ray Wood to help Adelaide to a 20–6 record and second on the regular season ladder behind the Brian Kerle coached Brisbane Bullets who featured Australian Olympian Larry Sengstock, arguably the league's best player and former West Adelaide championship player Leroy Loggins, Ronnie "The Rat" Radliff, and the "Black Pearl" Cal Bruton. The team had a bye going into the semi-final where they easily defeated for the Newcastle Falcons 151–103 at home in what the then record semi-final win in the NBL, something Ken Cole had publicly predicted would happen. Leading 105–84 going into the last period, Cole told his team that he wanted a record score for a Semi-final and the team responded, producing a 46–19 last period to blow the Falcons away and get the record. In the last single game NBL grand final ever played, Adelaide were up against the Brisbane Bullets on the Bullets' home court (Sleeman Sports Centre). Going into the final period the game the Bullets' were leading 78–74 but a 42–21 last period in favour of the home team with Loggins leading the way saw Adelaide fail to win their first grand final going down 95–120.

1985 would see Al Green set a single season points per game record for the 36ers when he scored 31.0 ppg in 28 games played (the record still stands as of 2016–17). Green, who Ken Cole chose to move to Point guard and leave Darryl Pearce at off guard, adjusted to his new role running the team's offense and also led the team in assists for the first time averaging 5.1 per game. His form saw him selected to his second All-NBL First Team after also winning selection in 1981 while with West Adelaide (amazingly, despite being the 1982 league MVP he had been overlooked for a place in the All NBL First Team that year). For his efforts during the season, 19-year-old guard Mike McKay was awarded the NBL's Rookie of the Year award (despite having already played 38 games with West Adelaide in 1983 and 1984 as a bench player). McKay played all 28 games, averaging 12.9 points, 3.4 rebounds and 1.3 assists per game.

1986 would see the Adelaide 36ers win the first of their four NBL championships. 27-year-old import centre Bill Jones replaced Peter Ali as captain and 6 ft 6 in (198 cm) former import forward (now a naturalised Australian citizen) Dwayne Nelson returned to the team after a year away, while Ken Cole would win the NBL Coach of the Year award after guiding the team to a 24–2 record, 5 more wins than the second placed Canberra Cannons (as of 2016–17 this is the only time a 36ers coach has won the award). The 36ers were undefeated at home during the regular season going 13–0, the first time a club had gone unbeaten at home in league history. The two games the 36ers lost in the regular season were both last second shots against the West Sydney Westars and Coburg Giants respectively. Those two losses ultimately denied Adelaide a perfect season but earned the team the nickname "The Invincibles" (the nickname was given by Adelaide's multi-award-winning basketball journalist Boti Nagy). Again earning a bye into the semi-finals, Adelaide this time accounted for the Illawarra Hawks 116–92 before moving onto their second grand final in a row, this time to be played over three games instead of the single game that had been in place previously. Once again facing the Brisbane Bullets, the 36ers won the first game of the series 122–119 in overtime in front of a then NBL record crowd of over 11,000 at the Brisbane Entertainment Centre. Back home in Adelaide the 36ers would lose only their third game of the year (and first at home, ending a 20-game home winning streak dating back to June 1985) when they lost Game 2 83–104 at Apollo. The final game played at home in front of a packed Apollo Stadium saw the Adelaide 36ers win their first championship with a 113–91 victory. Mark Davis finished second in the NBL in total rebounds (15.8 per game), won the NBL Grand Final MVP award and also won selection in the All NBL First Team. The 36ers average winning margin in 1986 was 17.8 points and 25 years later during the 2011–12 NBL season, the 1986 36ers were named the league's greatest ever team on the NBL's official website.

Despite the on court success there was controversy at the club during the 1986 season with coach Ken Cole suspended towards the end of the regular season by the club board over his smoking of marijuana joint during a road trip to Brisbane, a situation that Cole was open about and never denied. Indeed, in a television interview he stated that he was recommended it by his family doctor as a way of dealing with health problems (diabetes) and physical pain. After the story was broken in one of Adelaide's daily newspaper's at the time, The Advertiser, Cole was suspended by the club for the last two games and the team was coached by his assistant Don Shipway. Before the playoffs, the players got together and went to the club board demanding Cole's return, going so far as to tell the board that they would refuse to play unless Cole was coaching them. Under immense pressure from not only the players but the general public of Adelaide who supported Cole despite his admitted use of the drug, the club board relented and Cole returned for the 1986 playoffs, though it was known that he would be sacked over the incident at the end of the season regardless of a championship win or not.

Ken Cole, the 1986 NBL Coach of the Year and the 1986 championship winning coach was replaced for the 1987 NBL season by former Nunawading Spectres import guard Gary Fox, who would continue the work started by Cole by coaching Adelaide to their second minor premiership in a row with a 21–5 record, though their coaching styles were vastly different. While Cole was a coach who was high on motivating his players, Fox ran a much more stringent operation and the free-flowing 36ers of 1985 and 1986 became far more structured, much to the dismay of Al Green and Mike McKay who preferred a more free flowing offence. However, despite the change, for the third season running the team had earned a bye to the semi-finals where this time they would face the Perth Wildcats who were in their first ever playoffs. In a major upset the defending NBL champions lost the series 2–1 to the Wildcats. They won 99–98 in Perth but then lost games two and three 99–101 and 93–103 at Apollo. Perth had emerged from the doldrums of previous years and were the emerging power team in the NBL. The Wildcats and new coach Cal Bruton, who had left Brisbane after a public falling out with Bullets coach Brian Kerle following the 1986 season, built a team with the aim of beating the champion 36ers. Bruton recruited James Crawford to counter Mark Davis, former Harlem Globetrotter Kendall "Tiny" Pinder to counter Bill Jones, they had team captain Mike Ellis to counter Darryl Pearce and Bruton himself to oppose his best friend off the court, Al Green. The ploy worked with the Wildcats defeating the 36ers in what was considered an upset, though the Wildcats would be swept in the Grand Final by the Bullets.

After winning the Grand Final MVP award in 1986, Mark Davis would continue to have a major impact on the NBL when he jointly won the league's MVP award with Brisbane's Leroy Loggins. Davis also led the league in rebounding for the third straight season, averaging 17.8 for the year.

Adelaide finished with their third minor premiership in a row and the second under Gary Fox after finishing with a 19–5 record in 1988 but would again be beaten Semi-finalists. Bill Jones was replaced as team captain by Fox who appointed Australian Boomers representative Darryl Pearce as the new captain. Against the Ken Cole coached Falcons in Newcastle in Round 2, Darryl Pearce would set a still standing single game scoring record for the 36ers when he scored 48 points including 11 of 14 three-point attempts. 1988 also saw 6 ft 10 in (208 cm), Adelaide born centre and Australian Institute of Sport (AIS) attendee Mark Bradtke make his NBL debut for the 36ers. Bradtke had been signed by Ken Cole in 1986 as a 6 ft 8 in (203 cm) 16 year with more growing to come. Bradtke however, living in Brisbane at the time, committed to the AIS for two years before joining Adelaide. Playing mostly as a backup centre to the more experienced Bill Jones (and often playing as backup Power forward to Mark Davis), Bradtke played in 23 games, averaging 7.4 points and 5.4 rebounds and 1.4 blocks per game.

Both Darryl Pearce and Mark Bradtke won selection for Australia at the 1988 Summer Olympic Games in Seoul, helping the team to finish 4th after being defeated 49–78 in the bronze medal playoff game by a United States team that included future Hall of Fame players David Robinson and Mitch Richmond as well as NBA players Dan Majerle, Danny Manning and Hersey Hawkins. Bradtke's selection at age 18 making him the youngest player at the time to ever represent Australia in Basketball at the Summer Olympics (Bradtke turned 19 during the games).

1989 was to be Gary Fox's last season with the Adelaide 36ers and it saw the team drop to 6th on the regular season ladder with a 15–9 record. Bill Jones left the team to join former coach Ken Cole in Newcastle and was replaced as an import player by 1983 NCAA West Coast Conference Men's Basketball Player of the Year and former Los Angeles Lakers draft pick, 6 ft 7 in (201 cm) Orlando Phillips. The team had a down year by its recent standards and Adelaide was eliminated in the Elimination Final by their playoff nemesis, the Perth Wildcats. With Jones now gone from the team, Mark Bradtke became the starting centre for the 36ers and his star continued to rise with the Olympic representative winning the NBL's Most Improved Player award. Bradtke averaged 15.0 points, 7.6 rebounds and 1.3 blocks per game over the 24-game season.

=== 1990s ===
36ers long time assistant coach Don Shipway was appointed coach of the team for the 1990 NBL season which saw the team miss the playoffs for the first time since 1983 when they finished 9th with an 11–15 record, the club's first ever losing season. Mark Davis replaced Darryl Pearce captain of the team in 1990, a position he would hold until the end of the 1996 season. 1990 also saw the final year for former captain and local favourite Peter Ali who retired from playing at the end of the season after 279 games, 141 of them with the 36ers since 1985.

Shipway was retained as coach for the 1991 NBL season despite the team's worst ever performance in 1990. With the recruitment of import point guard Butch Hays to replace Al Green who had been pushed out and would join Newcastle, as well as a skinny 6 ft 10 in (208 cm), 19 year old, Noarlunga Tigers player Brett Wheeler joining the team to give extra size that the team lacked outside Bradtke, the team turned their form around finishing the regular season in 4th place with a 16–10 record. They lost their semi-final series to their nemesis, defending and eventual league champion the Perth Wildcats, missing out on their third grand final appearance in 5 years. 1991 was the last season that local favourite and former captain Darryl Pearce would play for the club, signing with the North Melbourne Giants from 1992. The season was also the team's last playing out of the 3,000 seat Apollo Stadium which had opened in 1969 as a new venue was due to be opened for the 1992 season.

Adelaide had played at the Apollo Stadium since the team's inception in 1982. However ticket demand was more than double that of what Apollo could hold (often tickets for games would be sold out in less than an hour), so in conjunction with the Basketball Association of South Australia (BASA), a new home for basketball in South Australia was opened in 1992 in the western suburb of Findon. Built on the site of a former rubbish dump, he AU$16m, 8,000 seat Clipsal Powerhouse quickly became a fortress for the 36ers with every game played in front of a sell-out crowd (at an open day for the new arena staged a week before the opening round, the 36ers sold over 6,000 season tickets for the 1992 season). However their road form wasn't so good and they dropped to 9th on the table with an 11–13 record. Mark Bradtke and Mike McKay would go on to represent Australia at the 1992 Summer Olympic Games in Barcelona. 1992 was also the rookie NBL season for Brett Maher who would go on to play a record 525 games for the club and captain the team to three NBL championships.

After their second losing season, the 36ers replaced Don Shipway as coach with American Don Monson for the 1993 season. The team had lost centre Mark Bradtke to the Melbourne Tigers in acrimonious circumstances during the off-season, but gained experience in NBL championship winners, Adelaide born Aussie Boomers captain Phil Smyth and veteran 6 ft 11 in (211 cm) centre Willie Simmons, both from the Canberra Cannons. Adelaide improved to a 14–12 record under Monson and made the playoffs finishing in 7th place but were beaten in the quarter-finals by the defending NBL champion South East Melbourne Magic. Whyalla junior and AIS attendee, barrel chested 6 ft 5 in (196 cm) forward Chris Blakemore was named the 1993 NBL Rookie of the Year, while 8th year guard (and future team coach) Scott Ninnis was voted as the NBL's Most Improved Player, scoring a career best 20.1 points and 4.4 assists per game after returning from two seasons in Melbourne with the Eastside Spectres and the Magic respectively. Ninnis, who made his NBL debut in 1985, had been part of the 1986 championship squad.

The Adelaide 36ers pulled off a major signing between the 1993 and 1994 seasons when they enticed the league's 1993 MVP Robert Rose away from the Magic. The undersized 36ers also acquired 6 ft 8 in (203 cm) forward Andrew Svaldenis from the Hobart Devils. They also had a new head coach in former NCAA coach Mike Dunlap. Finishing in 4th place with a 19–8 record, the 36ers won their semi-final series against the defending champion Melbourne Tigers to win their way into the 1994 NBL Grand Final series against the North Melbourne Giants. The win over the Tigers came at a cost though as team captain Mark Davis's court time was limited in the Grand Final after dislocating his right shoulder during the first game of the semi-finals. Adelaide went down to the Giants 0–2, losing game one at the Powerhouse 93–95 in overtime and game two at The Glass House in Melbourne 117–97. Robert Rose averaged 32 points for the 36ers over the two grand final games, scoring 33 in game one and 31 in game two. He played a major role in game one as Adelaide came back from 63 to 77 down in the last period down to level the game at 84–84 at the end of regulation time and most felt that had Adelaide won the series he would have been the leading candidate for the Grand Final MVP award. The award was deservedly won by Giants centre and future three time 36ers championship player Paul Rees.

Despite the departure of Phil Smyth to the Sydney Kings, Adelaide's good form continued into 1995 with the team reaching the semi-finals where they were eliminated by their playoff nemesis Perth who had also eliminated them in the 1987 and 1991 semi-finals, and the 1989 elimination final. After the 1995 season and twice winning the club's MVP award in his two seasons in Adelaide, Robert Rose was let go by the club who claimed that his asking price was too high. Privately the talk was that at 31 years of age, the club felt his best years were behind him. However, rumours had been circulating around Adelaide that former NCAA college coach Dunlap preferred to coach younger players who still could be taught and didn't get along very well with the team's older players, which led to the departures of Mike McKay (Brisbane), Phil Smyth (Sydney) and Robert Rose (Canberra). Dunlap had also been in hot water over an incident in the 1995 Semi-finals against Perth. During a time out of Game 1 at the Powerhouse, Dunlap had instructed Chris Blakemore to basically belt the next Perth player who went through the key. Minutes later, Blackmore backhanded Martin Cattalini as he cut through the key, giving him a cut on his mouth that required 15 stitches, an incident which almost led to a brawl (Cattalini later told that not retaliating was self-preservation as Blakemore, who looked more like a professional wrestler than a basketball player, had gained a reputation of one player not to mess with). Although Blakemore was suspended for Game 2 of the series in Perth, the club had not been happy with Dunlap's handling of the situation.

The team had recruited well going into the 1996 NBL season, obtaining forwards Martin Cattalini from the championship winning Perth Wildcats, and serial slam dunking forward Leon Trimmingham from the Sydney Kings, as well as 2nd year guard John Rillie from the Brisbane Bullets, while Chris Blakemore was released to join Canberra. Despite continued good form which saw the 36ers again make the playoffs under Dunlap in 1996, the 36ers were again eliminated in the semi-finals. Following the sudden death of his father after the 1996 season, coach Dunlap return home to the United States and decided to stay there to be closer to his family. However, it was not as simple as it looked. Since joining the 36ers, Dunlap had been systematically removing the older players from the squad, but when he wanted to release captain and club legend Mark Davis, the club board stood by Davis and after his father's passing it was mutually agreed that Dunlap would not return as coach.

During the 1996 season, 36ers guard Brett Maher was selected to play for the Australian Boomers at the 1996 Olympic Games in Atlanta. Maher, Mark Davis (who had become an Australian citizen in 1992), Brett Wheeler and Chris Blakemore had all made their debut for the Boomers in March 1995 at the Clipsal Powerhouse in the first of a 5-game series with the touring Magic Johnson All-Stars.

The club hired Dunlap's assistant and former Gold Coast Rollers coach Dave Claxton as his replacement for the 1997 NBL season. This season also saw Brett Maher take over the team captaincy from Mark Davis, something he would hold until his retirement in 2009, a record total of 381 games. Adelaide finished with a 14–16 record in 1997, finishing in 7th place and missing the playoffs for the first time since 1992.

=== 1998–2008: Phil Smyth Era ===
Claxton, who was only signed by the club at the last moment due to unexpectedly losing Mike Dunlap, was only signed for one season as head coach and following the 1997 season was replaced by rookie coach and former player Phil Smyth (it was incorrectly believed that Claxton had been sacked). Smyth was hired despite his only previous coaching experience being as a specialist coach at the Australian Institute of Sport during his playing days in Canberra. The club was banking on his years of NBL and international experience to translate into coaching. The gamble worked and the 36ers turned their fortunes around under Smyth and finished the regular season in 2nd place with a 19–11 record. The club head recruited 6 ft 9 in (206 cm) centre Paul Rees from North Melbourne as well as former Denver Nuggets guard, 6 ft 5 in (196 cm) Darnell Mee (who joined the team from the Canberra Cannons) and his former Nuggets teammate, 6 ft 6 in (198 cm) forward Kevin Brooks. They won through to the 1998 NBL Grand Final series by finally disposing their finals nemesis the Perth Wildcats in just 2 games. In the Grand Final they would be up against the South East Melbourne Magic where they would win the club's first championship since 1986 defeating the Magic 2–0, winning Game 1 100–93 at home and Game 2 90–62 at Melbourne Park. Kevin Brooks was named the Grand Final MVP in what was the last ever winter season for the National Basketball League. The 36ers had not been expected to defeat the Brian Goorjian coached Magic who had a 26–4 regular season record and had easily swept the Brisbane Bullets in the semi-finals. Amazingly, Game 1 of the Grand Final was only the second time the 36ers had defeated the Magic since the Eastside Melbourne Spectres and Southern Melbourne Saints had merged to form the Magic in 1992. The 36ers only other win against the Magic had been in 1997 at the Powerhouse.

Following the 1998 season, the NBL moved from being a winter league to playing during Australia's summer, meaning that seasons would start in October and finish in March rather than go from April to November (in preparation for the change, the 1998 season had started in January and ran to July rather than the usual April to October/November). The change in time slot didn't stop the defending NBL champion 36ers though as they finished the 1998–99 regular season with their first minor premiership since 1988 with an 18–8 record. Again winning their way into the Grand Final series, they became three time NBL champions and the first team to win back to back titles since Perth in 1990 and 1991 by defeating the Victoria Titans two games to one. Captain Brett Maher was voted the Grand Final MVP and coach Phil Smyth had his second championship in two years of coaching.

At the conclusion of the 1999 NBL championship season, the 36ers were invited to take part in the McDonald's Championship, held at the 12,000 seat Fila Forum in Milan, Italy. The 36ers finished 5th out of 6 in the tournament with a 1–1 record. After losing their first game 90–79 to Brazilian side CR Vasco da Gama, the team won the 5–6 place playoff 91–84 over Lebanese team Hekmeh BC. The 1999 McDonald's Championship was won by NBA champions the San Antonio Spurs who defeated Vasco da Gama 103–68 in the final. To date this was the last McDonald's Championship held.

The 36ers form would continue in both the 1999–2000 and 2000–01 seasons, despite losing star import forward Kevin Brooks to the Sydney Kings for the 1999–00 season after the NBL ruled that the 36ers could not keep him and remain under the salary cap, though he would return in 2000–01. They were again minor premiers in 1999–2000 with a 22–6 record but missed out on becoming the first team to win three NBL championships in a row when they lost in the semi-finals to the Titans. Following the 1999–00 season, Brett Maher and Martin Cattalini were selected to represent the Australian Boomers at the 2000 Olympics in Sydney.

After falling to 6th on the ladder at the end of 2000–01 and just scraping into the playoffs, the 36ers would again only advance as far as the semi-finals before losing to the eventual champions, the Wollongong Hawks. Import Darnell Mee, in his fourth year with the club would win his third consecutive NBL Best Defensive Player award but would be lost to the club at the end of the season due to salary cap restraints.

The 2000–01 season was also the last for longtime Adelaide favourite and former club captain Mark Davis who retired from playing after 482 NBL games, all with the Adelaide 36ers. At the time of his retirement, Mark Davis was the NBL's all-time leading rebounder having grabbed 5,200 in his career, averaging 10.7 per game. He was also the 36ers all-time leading scorer with 8,752 points (18.2 pg) and the team's leading shot blocker with 301 (0.6 pg). Davis was an integral member of the 1986, 1998 and 1998–99 championship teams.

2001–02 would see the Adelaide 36ers win a then record fourth NBL title and the third for coach Phil Smyth. The team would finish the regular season in 3rd place with a 17–13 record before winning their way into their sixth NBL Grand Final. Facing the West Sydney Razorbacks, Adelaide were victorious two games to one. Adelaide's 125 points in game 3 is the highest ever score in an NBL Grand Final game while they also hit a Grand Final record 19 three-pointers in the game. Adelaide captain Brett Maher became only the second player in NBL history along with Perth's Ricky Grace to win two Grand Final MVP awards. Joining the club that year was import shooting guard Willie Farley as well as local juniors Oscar Forman and Jacob Holmes.

Under Phil Smyth, Adelaide were beaten Elimination-Finalists in both 2002–03 and 2003–04. They were beaten quarter-finalists in both the 2004–05 and 2005–06 seasons. The 2006–07 NBL season saw the 36ers miss the playoffs for the first time since Smyth took over as coach, finishing a club record worst-place of 11th with an 11–13 record. They would again miss the playoffs in 2007–08 finishing in 9th place with a 14–16 record. Following his second losing season, the team decided to replace Phil Smyth as head coach with former player and Smyth assistant Scott Ninnis.

=== 2008–present ===
Ninnis would coach the team for two seasons of a 3-season contract, leading the team to the Elimination Finals in 2008–09. The team, which included local junior and former NBA player, 7 ft 1 in (216 cm) centre Luke Schenscher, finished the regular season in 6th place with a 15–15 record before losing their quarter-final 131–101 to the New Zealand Breakers in Auckland. 2009 was also the last season for the club games record holder Brett Maher who was retiring after 526 NBL games and three championships with the 36ers. The 2009–10 season was a disaster however and the Adelaide 36ers finished on the bottom of the NBL ladder for the first time in their history with a 10–18 record. Former Michigan State Spartans NCAA Final Four championship winner and now naturalised Australian, 6 ft 9 in (206 cm) forward/centre Adam Ballinger, in his third season with the club became team captain in 2009–10 following the retirement of Maher.

Long serving club captain Brett Maher, who made his 36ers debut on the night they opened the Clipsal Powerhouse, retired from the NBL having played in 525 games for the club, captaining the club to 3 NBL championships (1998, 1998/99, 2001/02), and twice winning the NBL's Grand Final MVP award in 1998/99 and 2001/02. On the occasion of his last home game against the New Zealand Breakers in front of an overflow crowd of more than 8,000 fans, the main court at The Dome was renamed the Brett Maher Court. Maher also played over 100 games for the Australian Boomers and had the honour of captaining the Boomers at the 2001 Goodwill Games held in Brisbane, becoming the first 36ers player to captain his country.

Following the club's worst ever season, Scott Ninnis was sacked as coach and replaced by former AIS coach Marty Clarke for the 2010–11 NBL season. Clarke, a former guard who had won the NBL Grand Final with the North Melbourne Giants in 1989, had experience coaching at the AIS, though he had never before coached an NBL team nor had he any experience coaching a senior team in any competition.

Adelaide and Clarke endured a difficult season in 2010–11. They lost guard Nathan Herbert before the season with an Anterior cruciate ligament injury. Further injuries to import guards Troy DeVries and Craig Winder ultimately saw them replaced in the squad. For the first time in their history, the Adelaide 36ers failed to win at least 10 games in a season, finishing with a 9–19 record. They did avoid their second straight last place finish only because the returning Sydney Kings finished with an 8–20 record. Captain Adam Ballinger was again the club's leading player as he won his fourth straight club MVP award, finished third in the NBL's MVP voting and was selected to the NBL's All Third team.

Things didn't get any better for the 36ers or Clarke in the 2011–12 and 2012–13 seasons. The club finished with the wooden spoon in both seasons and ended each with an 8–20 record, including a club record losing streak of 8 straight games during each season. The club was also plagued by a string of failed imports, though most were lost through injury, others either under-performed or were misused by the coaching staff, with one of the only shining lights being power forward Diamon Simpson who posted 12 double-doubles in 27 games. At the end of the 2012–13 NBL season coach Clarke and his assistant coach Mark Radford were let go by the club. There were bright spots though. The emergence of 6 ft 11 in (211 cm) centre Daniel Johnson as a scoring and rebounding threat (he led the club in scoring for both seasons and led the NBL with 8 rebounds per game in 2012–13), the signing of former Gold Coast Blaze players Adam Gibson, Anthony Petrie and Jason Cadee, and the emergence of exciting young Victorian Swingman and crowd favourite Mitch Creek (who suffered a season ending Achilles tendon injury in mid-2012–13), gave fans hope for the future.

For the 2013–14 NBL season, the Adelaide 36ers signed the 2007 NBL championship winning coach Joey Wright as their new head coach and added former 36ers championship player Kevin Brooks as his assistant. In desperate need of on-court direction, the club also signed the 2011 NBL MVP, point guard Gary Ervin. After Round 7 of the season the 36ers, led by Ervin and Johnson, were sitting in 2nd place on the NBL ladder with a 7–2 record which included a 5–0 run. This also saw the team sweep both of their games against the Breakers in Auckland, their first wins over the triple defending champions since 2009. During Rd.7 the 36ers underlined their championship credentials when they defeated the previously undefeated Perth Wildcats 91–86 in front of 6,585 fans at the Adelaide Arena, the largest 36ers home crowd since Brett Maher's last home game in 2009.

The 36ers run in 2013–14 which saw them finish the regular season in second place with an 18–10 record. They then defeated the Melbourne Tigers 2–1 in their semi-final series before going down 2–1 in the Grand Final series to their long time nemesis Perth who won their record 6th NBL championship. Daniel Johnson won his third straight club MVP award and was also named to the All NBL First Team. Game 2 of the Grand Final series also saw the club's record home attendance of 8,127 at the Adelaide Arena with the 36ers keeping the series alive with an 89–84 win. The 8,127 attendance was more than 300 over capacity.

The 2015–16 season saw the 36ers sign import point guard Jerome Randle to replace Kenyon McNeail, who sustained an injury and left after three games, while the team also acquired young guard Nathan Sobey from the Cairns Taipans. Randle led the league in scoring and earned the inaugural NBL Australia Post Fan's MVP. Despite Randle's great individual season, the 36ers failed to make the playoffs with a 14–14 record.

In the 2016 NBL off-season, the 36ers managed to retain superstar Jerome Randle as well as signing promising young prospects Anthony Drmic, the younger brother of former NBL player Frank Drmic, Sudanese born local Majok Deng and import forward/centre Eric Jacobsen. Also joining the club was NBA draft prospect, 18-year-old high school star from Tulsa, Oklahoma named Terrance Ferguson, a 6 ft 7 in (201 cm) shooting guard who joined Adelaide rather than commit to playing college basketball.

While most experts predicted the young and relatively inexperienced 36ers to finish last, the 2016–17 NBL season saw the 36ers emerge as the team to beat. After a slow start which saw the team with a 3–6 record by Round 7 where they took a 105–87 mauling at home by the Brisbane Bullets (who returned to the NBL for the first time since 2008), plus early season injuries to captain Mitch Creek (ankle) and Daniel Johnson (hamstring), the 36ers turned their season around from Round 8 with a 101–83 away win over Brisbane, highlighted by a monster Terrance Ferguson dunk. With Creek and Johnson back on deck as well as the MVP form of Randle and Nathan Sobey looking a strong candidate for the NBL's Most Improved Player award, the team went on a charge, winning 14 of their next 15 games and by the end of Round 16 of the 19 round season had been confirmed as minor premiers for the first time since the 1999–2000, being an incredible 5 games ahead of the chasing pack. Despite being so far in front, Adelaide lost their final four games of the regular season and still finished two games ahead of the top. Their loss of momentum proved costly in the NBL Final Series, with the 36ers bundled out in a three-game series against the Illawarra Hawks.

With the 36ers' list proving it had what it takes to contend the championship, Joey Wright locked in all eight Australians players (Mitch Creek, Nathan Sobey, Daniel Johnson, Matthew Hodgson, Brendan Teys, Majok Deng, Anthony Drmic and Adam Doyle) from the 2016–17 roster for the 2017–18 season. One notable absence from the roster was star US import, Jerome Randle, who was replaced by experienced guard, Shannon Shorter. Philadelphian shooting guard, Ramone Moore, and athletic forward Ronald Roberts took the other two import spots to complete the list. In mid-September 2017, the 36ers travelled to Singapore in the pre-season to compete in the Merlion Cup. The team remained undefeated throughout the tournament and defeated the Shanghai Sharks in the final to be crowned the 2017 Merlion Cup Champions.

The Sixers impressed on the road early, but struggled to string consistent performances together, winning half of their first 16 games. A disappointing 19-point loss against the Cairns Taipans at home on Christmas Eve was the turning point for the Sixers, who went on to win 10 of their last 12 games, including seven-in-a-row, and booking themselves second spot on the ladder at the end of the regular season.

The 36ers defeated the Perth Wildcats in a straight sweep of the semi-final Series, to secure their spot in the Grand Final Series against Melbourne United. The series was a hard-fought battle, with both teams winning on their home court to level the series at one-all. In the deciding game in Melbourne, United were too strong for the Sixers defeating them to take the 2017–18 championship, 100–82.

In the 2025–26 NBL season, the 36ers reached the inaugural NBL Ignite Cup Final, where they lost 111–107 to the New Zealand Breakers despite a game-high 34 points from Bryce Cotton. They went on to reach the NBL Championship Series with a 2–1 victory over the South East Melbourne Phoenix in the semi-finals. In game one of the Championship Series against the Sydney Kings, the 36ers were defeated 112–68. The 36ers went on to finish runners-up with a 3–2 series loss. Following the season, Mike Wells unexpectedly departed the 36ers and was subsequently replaced by former Perth Wildcats head coach Trevor Gleeson.

The Adelaide 36ers have reached the playoffs 24 times in 34 full seasons, and on top of their four championships in 1986, 1998, 1998–99 and 2001–02, they reached the Grand Final in 1985, 1994, 2013–14 and 2017–18. They have also finished as minor premier on six occasions (1986, 1987, 1988, 1998–99, 1999–2000, 2016–17), and reached the NBL semi-finals in 1987, 1988, 1991, 1995, 1996, 1999–2000, 2000–01, 2014–15, 2016–17 and 2017–18.

== Sponsorship ==
The Adelaide 36ers were previously sponsored by Pura Milk and with the naming rights of Pura Milk 36ers. Before this they were the West End 36ers (as in West End Brewery) during their first title year (1986) while also taking various names from West End products including being known for a time during the 1990s as the Eagle Super 6ers. In 2009 the team was sponsored by Hood Sweeney, an Adelaide-based consulting firm and were known as the Hood Sweeney Adelaide 36ers. Other major sponsors include Kia Motors and Sprint Auto Parts. In 2017–18 the Adelaide 36ers' major partners were Pathion, Scouts, Ananda, Goodlife and Villi's.

== Coaches ==
The first head coach of the Adelaide City Eagles in 1982 was Mike Osborne, who would coach the team (renamed the Adelaide 36ers in 1983) until the end of the 1984 season.

As of the 2025-26 season, the Adelaide 36ers have had fifteen head coaches, including Ken Cole who coached the team to two NBL Grand Finals in his two seasons with the club (1985 and 1986) and led the team to their first ever championship in 1986, the first time the NBL Grand Final was a best of 3 series instead of a single championship game. Cole is also the only 36ers coach to be named as the NBL's Coach of the Year having won the award in 1986. Upon his death in 2026, the 36ers held a minute of silence and left his number one ticket holder seat empty.

Former St Kilda import guard Gary Fox took over as coach in 1987 after Cole's sensational sacking from the club and led the team to the 1987 and 1988 minor premiership, but the team was defeated in the semi-finals each season by the Perth Wildcats and Canberra Cannons respectively. Fox's last season with Adelaide was 1989 where the team finished as beaten Elimination finalists.

Fox was replaced by the club's long-time assistant coach Don Shipway who coached the team from 1990 to 1992. Unfortunately, Shipway will more be remembered for slapping a fan during a time-out of an away game against the Hobart Devils in 1992. The NBL suspended Shipway for 4 games (later reduced to 2 on appeal). Shipway was replaced for the 1993 season by veteran American coach Don Monson.

American Mike Dunlap who led the team to the 1994 NBL Grand Final series against the North Melbourne Giants, and the 1995 NBL Semi-finals, went on to become head coach of the Charlotte Bobcats of the NBA for one season in 2012–13, becoming the first person to be a head coach in both the NBL and the NBA.

The 36ers longest serving coach was Adelaide born Australian basketball legend Phil Smyth. "The General" coached the team for 11 seasons from 1998 to 2007–08, leading the club to the 1998, 1998–99 and 2001–02 NBL championships. In 1998 Smyth became the first rookie coach since Brian Kerle in the league's inaugural season (1979) to win an NBL championship, though unlike Kerle, Smyth had limited previous senior coaching experience. He had coached the South Adelaide Panthers senior women's team in the early 1980s and later was a part-time specialist coach at the Canberra based Australian Institute of Sport (AIS) during his playing days with the Canberra Cannons from 1983 to 1992.

From 2013-2020, the Adelaide 36ers were coached by the 2006–07 NBL championship (Brisbane Bullets) winning coach Joey Wright, with former dual 36ers championship player Kevin Brooks as the assistant coach.

=== List of 36ers coaches ===
- Mike Osborne: 1982–1984
- Ken Cole: 1985–1986
- Gary Fox: 1987–1989
- Don Shipway: 1990–1992
- Don Monson: 1993
- Mike Dunlap: 1994–1996
- Dave Claxton: 1997
- Phil Smyth: 1998–2008
- Scott Ninnis: 2008–2010
- Marty Clarke: 2010–2013
- Joey Wright: 2013–2020
- Conner Henry: 2020–2021
- C. J. Bruton: 2021–2023
- Scott Ninnis: 2023–2024
- Mike Wells: 2024–2026
- Trevor Gleeson: 2026–present

== Ownership ==
In April 2006 the 36ers, the Adelaide Lightning WNBL team and the team's home venue, the Distinctive Homes Dome (now the Adelaide Arena), went up for sale due to mishandling of debt owed to the government by the then owner BASA. On 25 July 2006, a consortium of NBL chairman Mal Hemmerling, and Eddy Groves of ABC Learning bought the Adelaide 36ers and the Distinctive Homes Dome for $3.95 million – with Hemmerling in place as owner of the 36ers and Groves as the owner of the stadium. The money for the sale went to the government to wipe out the debt owed by BASA. BASA is now defunct and replaced by Basketball SA – focused solely on all Basketball in SA and no one competition.

In June 2009, Hemmerling sold the team to a group of eight individuals led by new club chairman Mark Lewis and new club CEO Ben Fitzsimons called the Save Our Sixers Consortium.

In June 2015, a new group acquired the Adelaide 36ers' licence from the NBL which included management of Titanium Security Arena, the former Adelaide Arena.

In 2016, Grant Kelley became the major shareholder of the 36ers as well as chairman. In September 2023, Kelley became sole owner of the 36ers after increasing his shareholding in the club to 100 per cent.

== Home arena ==
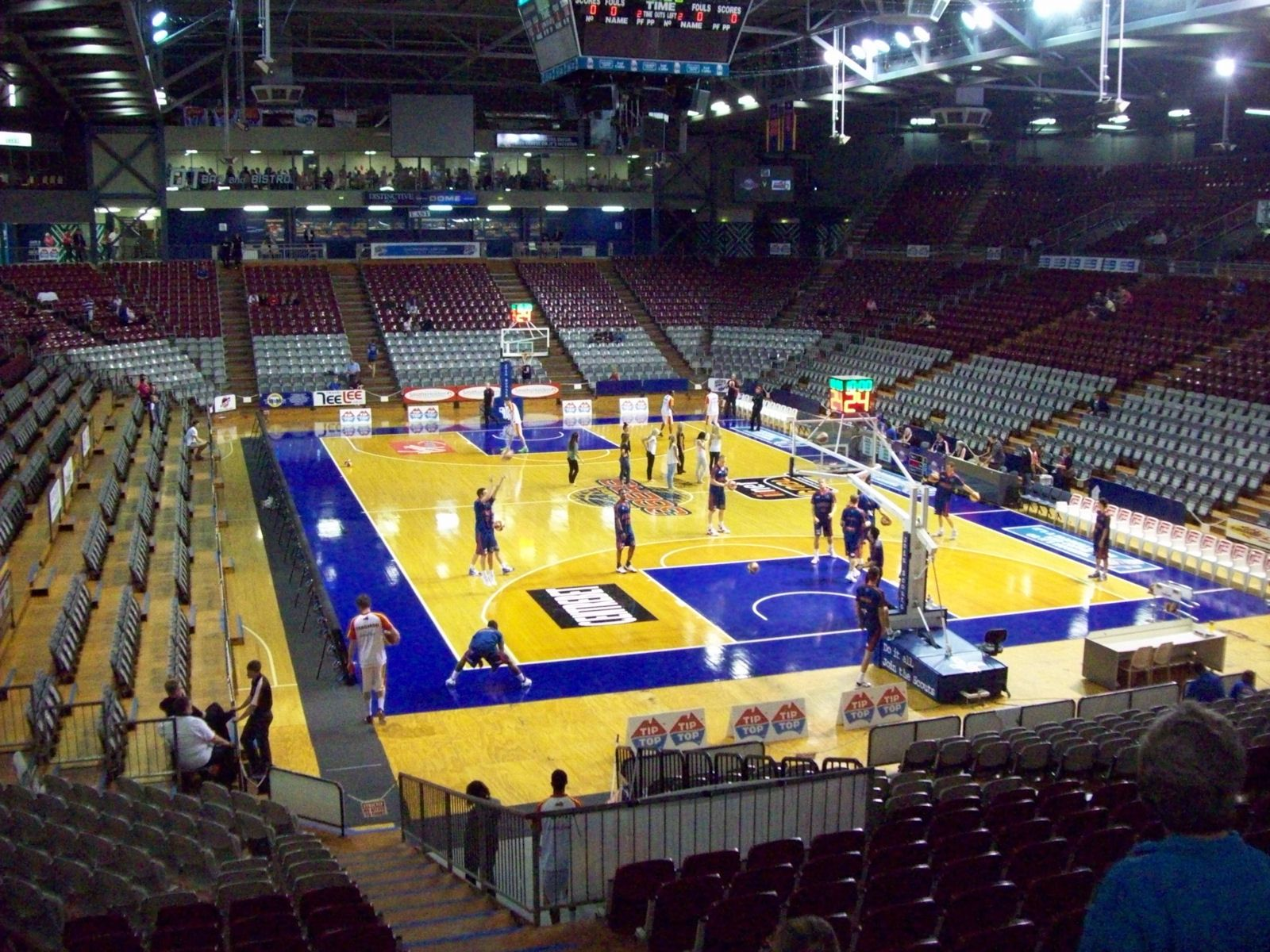
The Brett Maher Court at the Adelaide Arena in 2011

Between 1982 and 1991, the home court of the Eagles/36ers was the old 3,000 seated Apollo Stadium which had been built in 1969. From 1985 onward, home games were usually in front of sell-out crowds, but going into the 1990s demand for 36ers tickets was greater than what Apollo Stadium could hold. Additionally, the NBL as a whole was also experiencing a boom with the Brisbane Bullets, Perth Wildcats, and Sydney Kings all enjoying record attendances in their respective cities' new entertainment centre's, the smallest of those being Perth which held almost three times what Apollo could. During their time at Apollo, the Adelaide 36ers reached the 1985 Grand Final (played in Brisbane) and hosted two games of the successful 1986 Grand Final series win over Brisbane. The 36ers final game at their original home was a 102–99 semi-final loss to the Perth Wildcats in 1991.

By the end of the 1991 NBL season, Adelaide was one of only 5 teams in the league (there were 14) who did not have a home venue that could hold at least 5,000 fans, and it was the only state capital based team (other than the unrepresented Darwin) not to have a home venue that could hold at least 5,200 fans.

The 36ers and the BASA built a new home arena in the western suburb of Findon, which opened in 1992. Initially it was thought that the 36ers would move into the 10,500 seat, South Australian Government owned Adelaide Entertainment Centre, which opened in 1991. The Entertainment Centre had been built as the replacement for Apollo Stadium as Adelaide's major indoor concert venue as Apollo was continually being overlooked by international music acts due to its smaller size. However, rather than just be a tenant where they would pay a fee to use the facility and be subject to possible date changes due to pre-booked events, both the Adelaide 36ers and BASA wished for their own venue of operations and play that would serve as the home of basketball in South Australia.

The then-named Clipsal Powerhouse, which has an official capacity of 8,000, was and still is the largest purpose-built basketball stadium in all of Australia. Clipsal would sponsor the venue until the end of the 2001–02 season, after which it became known as the Distinctive Homes Dome in recognition of the sponsorship from Distinctive Homes.

The Dome had been without a naming rights sponsor since mid-2009. However, on 7 February of that same year, before a crowd of 7,800 fans, the main court was named the Brett Maher Court. This was due in honour of retiring long time club captain Brett Maher who had made his 36ers and NBL debut on the night the Powerhouse opened in 1992. He had played all 526 career NBL games for the club on that same court. That day, the 36ers, led by Maher, who scored 17 points in his last ever home game, defeated the New Zealand Breakers by a final score of 102–91. The venue is now (as of 2015) officially known as the Titanium Security Arena due to sponsorship from Adelaide-based company Titanium Security Australia.

During 2012 and 2013, the Adelaide Arena was in the hands of the Commonwealth Bank after former owner Eddy Groves defaulted on his loan. After much speculation that the venue would be sold and turned into a venue for other purposes, including rumours of the building being turned it into a church (effectively leaving the 36ers without a home venue and the unwanted possibility of playing at the Entertainment Centre or even the 3,000 seat Netball SA Stadium), it was announced on 3 April 2013 that SA Church Basketball and Scouts SA had become joint owners of the Adelaide Arena, ensuring it remains the home of basketball in South Australia and for both of Adelaide's national basketball teams, the 36ers and the Adelaide Lightning (Women's National Basketball League).

The renamed Titanium Security Arena is currently the sixth-largest venue used in the National Basketball League behind the 18,200 seat Qudos Bank Arena in Sydney, the 14,856 seat Perth Arena, the 14,500 capacity Brisbane Entertainment Centre, the 10,500 seat Hisense Arena in Melbourne, and the 9,300 seat Vector Arena in Auckland. It is also the only venue in the NBL that is basketball specific (though it does host other events such as netball) with all other venues either being entertainment/convention centres, tennis stadiums or general sports venues.

The 36ers highest ever home attendance was set on 11 April 2014 during Game 2 of the 2014 NBL Grand Final series against the Perth Wildcats at the Adelaide Arena. Although Perth would go on to win the 3-game series 2–1, a 36ers and South Australian basketball record 8,127 fans saw the 36ers win Game 2 89–84.

- Apollo Stadium (1982–1991)
- Titanium Security Arena (1992–2019)
- Adelaide Entertainment Centre (2019–present)

== Mascot ==
The Adelaide 36ers team mascot is Murray the Magpie. The magpie was chosen as the bird is found throughout Adelaide, while Murray's first name comes from the Murray River, one of South Australia's best known landmarks. Murray wears the team's No. 36 jersey.

== Honour roll ==
NBL Championships:	4 (1986, 1998, 1998/99, 2001/02)
Regular Season Champions:	6 (1986, 1987, 1988, 1999, 2000, 2017)
NBL Finals Appearances:	27 (1984, 1985, 1986, 1987, 1988, 1989, 1991, 1993, 1994, 1995, 1996, 1998, 1999, 2000, 2001, 2002, 2003, 2004, 2005, 2006, 2009, 2014, 2015, 2017, 2018, 2025, 2026)
NBL Grand Final / Championship Series Appearances:	9 (1985, 1986, 1994, 1998, 1999, 2002, 2014, 2018, 2026)
NBL Most Valuable Players:	Mark Davis (1987), Jerome Randle (2016/17)
NBL Grand Final MVPs:	Mark Davis (1986), Kevin Brooks (1998), Brett Maher (1998/99, 2001/02)
NBL All-Star Game MVPs:	Mark Davis (1991), Robert Rose (1995)
All-NBL First Team:	Dan Clausen (1984), Al Green (1985), Mark Davis (1986, 1987, 1988, 1989, 1991), Robert Rose (1995), Kevin Brooks (1998/99), Brett Maher (1999/2000, 2002/03, 2005/06), Darnell Mee (2000/01), Daniel Johnson (2013/14, 2016/17, 2017/18), Brock Motum (2014/15), Jerome Randle (2015/16, 2016/17)
All-NBL Second Team:	Butch Hays (1991), Mark Davis (1994), Robert Rose (1994), Kevin Brooks (1998), Darnell Mee (1998/99), Willie Farley (2001/02), Martin Cattalini (2003/04), Brett Maher (2004/05), Dusty Rychart (2004/05), Adam Ballinger (2007/08, 2008/09, 2009/10), Daniel Johnson (2012/13, 2015/16), Jamar Wilson (2014/15), Nathan Sobey (2016/17), Mitch Creek (2017/18)
All-NBL Third Team:	Mark Bradtke (1992), Mark Davis (1992), Butch Hays (1992), Scott Ninnis (1993), Brett Maher (1998/99, 2001/02), Martin Cattalini (2002/03), Willie Farley (2004/05), Dusty Rychart (2005/06), Julius Hodge (2007/08), John Gilchrist (2009/10), Adam Ballinger (2010/11), Daniel Johnson (2011/12), Adam Gibson (2012/13)
NBL Coach of the Year:	Ken Cole (1986), Joey Wright (2016/17)
NBL Rookie of the Year:	Mike McKay (1985), Chris Blakemore (1993), Aaron Bruce (2008/09), Anthony Drmic (2016/17), Harry Froling (2018/19), Josh Giddey (2020/21)
NBL Most Improved Player:	Mark Bradtke (1989), Scott Ninnis (1993), Chris Blakemore (1994), Daniel Johnson (2011/12), Nathan Sobey (2016/17)
NBL Best Defensive Player:	Darnell Mee (1998/99, 1999/2000, 2000/01), Antonius Cleveland (2022/23)
NBL Best Sixth Man:	Ramone Moore (2017/18)
Fans MVP:	Kai Sotto (2021/22, 2022/23)
GameTime by Kmart:	Sunday Dech (2023/24)

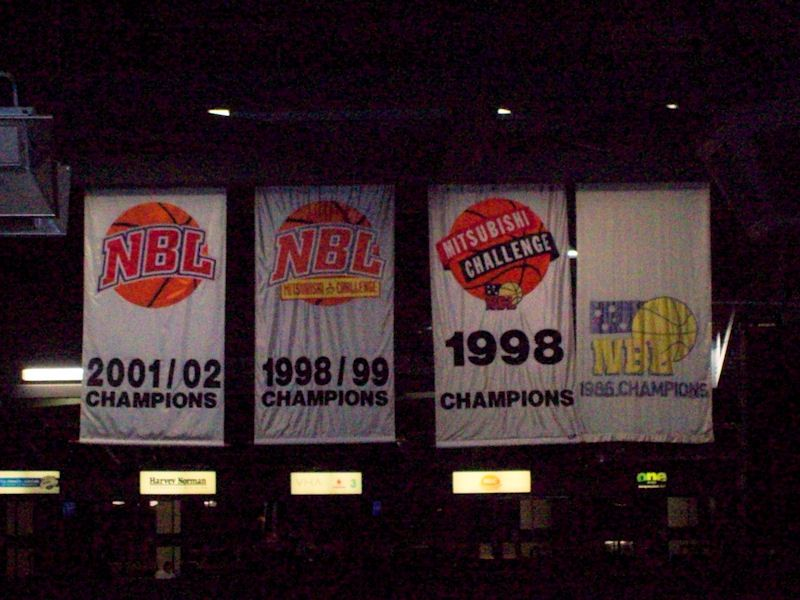
Adelaide 36ers NBL Championship banners

== Season by season ==
NBL champions	League champions	Runners-up	Finals berth

Season	Tier	League	Regular season					Post-season	Head coach	Captain	Club MVP
Season	Tier	League	Finish	Played	Wins	Losses	Win %	Post-season	Head coach	Captain	Club MVP
Adelaide City Eagles
1982	1	NBL	7th	26	15	11	.577	Did not qualify	Mike Osborne	Chris Stirling	not awarded
Adelaide 36ers
1983	1	NBL	6th	22	11	11	.500	Did not qualify	Mike Osborne	David Winslow	not awarded
1984	1	NBL	3rd	23	16	7	.696	Lost elimination final (Nunawading) 101–108	Mike Osborne	Dean Kinsman	not awarded
1985	1	NBL	2nd	26	20	6	.769	Won semifinal (Newcastle) 151–103; Lost NBL final (Brisbane) 95–121	Ken Cole	Peter Ali	Mark Davis
1986	1	NBL	1st	26	24	2	.923	Won semifinal (Illawarra) 116–92; Won NBL finals (Brisbane) 2–1	Ken Cole	Bill Jones	Mark Davis**
1987	1	NBL	1st	26	21	5	.808	Lost semifinals (Perth) 1–2	Gary Fox	Bill Jones	Mark Davis*
1988	1	NBL	1st	24	19	5	.792	Lost semifinals (Canberra) 0–2	Gary Fox	Darryl Pearce; Peter Ali	Mark Davis
1989	1	NBL	6th	24	15	9	.625	Lost elimination finals (Perth) 1–2	Gary Fox	Darryl Pearce	Mark Davis
1990	1	NBL	9th	26	11	15	.423	Did not qualify	Don Shipway	Mark Davis	Mark Davis
1991	1	NBL	4th	26	16	10	.615	Won elimination finals (Melbourne), 2–0; Lost semifinals (Perth) 0–2	Don Shipway	Mark Davis	Mark Davis
1992	1	NBL	9th	24	11	13	.458	Did not qualify	Don Shipway	Mark Davis	Mark Davis
1993	1	NBL	7th	26	14	12	.538	Lost quarterfinals (S.E. Melbourne) 0–2	Don Monson	Mark Davis	Mark Davis
1994	1	NBL	4th	26	18	8	.692	Won quarterfinals (Brisbane) 2–1; Won semifinals (Melbourne) 2–0; Lost NBL finals (North Melbourne) 0–2	Mike Dunlap	Mark Davis	Robert Rose
1995	1	NBL	4th	26	17	9	.654	Won quarterfinals (Newcastle) 2–1; Lost semifinals (Perth) 0–2	Mike Dunlap	Mark Davis	Robert Rose
1996	1	NBL	6th	26	16	10	.615	Won quarterfinals (Perth) 2–1; Lost semifinals (S.E. Melbourne) 0–2	Mike Dunlap	Mark Davis	Rick Brunson
1997	1	NBL	7th	30	14	16	.467	Did not qualify	Dave Claxton	Brett Maher	Brett Maher
1998	1	NBL	2nd	30	19	11	.633	Won semifinals (Perth) 2–0; Won NBL finals (S.E. Melbourne) 2–0	Phil Smyth	Brett Maher	Brett Maher; Darnell Mee
1998–99	1	NBL	1st	26	18	8	.692	Won qualifying finals (Perth) 2–0; Won semifinals (Wollongong) 2–0; Won NBL finals (Victoria) 2–1	Phil Smyth	Brett Maher	Kevin Brooks
1999–2000	1	NBL	1st	28	22	6	.786	Lost semifinals (Victoria) 1–2	Phil Smyth	Brett Maher	Martin Cattalini
2000–01	1	NBL	6th	28	16	12	.571	Won qualifying finals (Victoria) 2–1; Lost semifinals (Wollongong) 1–2	Phil Smyth	Brett Maher	Darnell Mee
2001–02	1	NBL	3rd	30	17	13	.567	Won qualifying finals (Wollongong) 2–0; Won semifinals (Victoria) 2–1; Won NBL finals (West Sydney) 2–1	Phil Smyth	Brett Maher	Brett Maher**
2002–03	1	NBL	5th	30	16	14	.533	Lost qualifying finals (Perth) 1–2	Phil Smyth	Brett Maher	Brett Maher
2003–04	1	NBL	8th	33	14	19	.424	Lost elimination final (Melbourne) 107–111	Phil Smyth	Brett Maher	Martin Cattalini
2004–05	1	NBL	4th	32	19	13	.594	Lost quarterfinal (Brisbane) 110–125	Phil Smyth	Brett Maher	Willie Farley
2005–06	1	NBL	4th	32	19	13	.594	Lost quarterfinal (Cairns) 103–106	Phil Smyth	Brett Maher	Brett Maher
2006–07	1	NBL	11th	33	11	22	.333	Did not qualify	Phil Smyth	Brett Maher	Brett Maher
2007–08	1	NBL	9th	30	14	16	.467	Did not qualify	Phil Smyth	Brett Maher	Adam Ballinger
2008–09	1	NBL	6th	30	15	15	.500	Lost elimination final (New Zealand) 101–131	Scott Ninnis	Brett Maher	Adam Ballinger
2009–10	1	NBL	8th	28	10	18	.357	Did not qualify	Scott Ninnis	Adam Ballinger	Adam Ballinger
2010–11	1	NBL	8th	28	9	19	.321	Did not qualify	Marty Clarke	Adam Ballinger	Adam Ballinger
2011–12	1	NBL	9th	28	8	20	.286	Did not qualify	Marty Clarke	Adam Ballinger	Daniel Johnson
2012–13	1	NBL	8th	28	8	20	.286	Did not qualify	Marty Clarke	Adam Gibson; Nathan Crosswell	Daniel Johnson
2013–14	1	NBL	2nd	28	18	10	.643	Won semifinals (Melbourne) 2–1; Lost NBL finals (Perth) 1–2	Joey Wright	Adam Gibson	Daniel Johnson
2014–15	1	NBL	3rd	28	17	11	.607	Lost semifinals (New Zealand) 0–2	Joey Wright	Adam Gibson	Jamar Wilson
2015–16	1	NBL	5th	28	14	14	.500	Did not qualify	Joey Wright	Adam Gibson	Jerome Randle
2016–17	1	NBL	1st	28	17	11	.607	Lost semifinals (Illawarra) 1–2	Joey Wright	Mitch Creek	Jerome Randle*
2017–18	1	NBL	2nd	28	18	10	.643	Won semifinals (Perth) 2–0; Lost NBL finals (Melbourne) 2–3	Joey Wright	Brendan Teys	Mitch Creek
2018–19	1	NBL	5th	28	14	14	.500	Did not qualify	Joey Wright	Daniel Johnson	Daniel Johnson
2019–20	1	NBL	7th	28	12	16	.429	Did not qualify	Joey Wright	Brendan Teys; Kevin White	Daniel Johnson
2020–21	1	NBL	7th	36	13	23	.361	Did not qualify	Conner Henry	Daniel Dillon; Daniel Johnson; Brendan Teys	Josh Giddey; Daniel Johnson
2021–22	1	NBL	7th	28	10	18	.357	Did not qualify	C. J. Bruton	Mitch McCarron	Daniel Johnson
2022–23	1	NBL	8th	28	13	15	.464	Did not qualify	C. J. Bruton	Mitch McCarron	Antonius Cleveland
2023–24	1	NBL	9th	28	12	16	.429	Did not qualify	C. J. Bruton; Scott Ninnis	Mitch McCarron	Isaac Humphries
2024–25	1	NBL	6th	29	13	16	.448	Won play-in qualifier (Sydney) 95–88; Lost play-in game (S.E. Melbourne) 75–85	Mike Wells	Dejan Vasiljevic	Kendric Davis
2025–26	1	NBL	2nd	33	23	10	.697	Won semifinals (S.E. Melbourne) 2–1; Lost NBL finals (Sydney) 2–3	Mike Wells	Bryce Cotton; Isaac Humphries; Dejan Vasiljevic	Bryce Cotton*
Regular season record				1259	687	572	.542	6 regular season champions			
Finals record				101	50	51	.495	4 NBL championships			

As of the end of the 2025–26 season

* Club and League MVP
** Club and League Grand Final MVP

*Note: In 1983 and 1984, the NBL was split into Eastern and Western divisions during the regular season.

Source: Club Records

== Club and player records ==
=== Players ===
- Most points in a game: 48 – Darryl Pearce vs Newcastle Falcons at the Newcastle Sports Entertainment Centre, 20 February 1988
- Most 3 pointers in a game: 11 – Darryl Pearce vs Newcastle Falcons at the Newcastle Sports Entertainment Centre, 20 February 1988, and Brett Maher vs Brisbane Bullets at the Clipsal Powerhouse, 14 September 1996
- Most assists in a game: 17 – Butch Hays vs Melbourne Tigers at the Apollo Stadium, 27 September 1991
- Most blocks in a game: 9 – Darnell Mee vs Canberra Cannons at the Clipsal Powerhouse, 25 November 2000
- Most steals in a game: 7 – Robert Rose vs Newcastle Falcons at the Clipsal Powerhouse, 22 April 1995
- Most rebounds in a game: 31 – Dan Clausen vs Canberra Cannons at the AIS Arena, 5 May 1984

=== Team ===
- Biggest win: 75 – Adelaide def. Illawarra Hawks 156–81 at the Apollo Stadium, 20 July 1985
- Biggest loss: 48 – Brisbane Bullets def. Adelaide 155–107 at the Brisbane Convention Centre, 19 January 2008
- Biggest home loss: 39 – Melbourne United def. Adelaide 118–79 at the Adelaide Arena, 15 November 2014
- Longest winning streak: 14 – 22 June – 10 August 1985, and 26 July – 11 October 1986
- Longest losing streak: 8 – 4 February – 18 March 2011, and 30 November 2012 – 5 January 2013
- Most team points: 160 vs Hobart Devils (127) at the Apollo Stadium, 20 March 1984

==== All-time NBL Finals records ====
- Most points scored in an NBL Grand Final game: 125 – Adelaide def. West Sydney Razorbacks 107, Game 3 at the Clipsal Powerhouse, 19 April 2002

=== All-time leaders ===
- Games played: 525 – Brett Maher (1992–2009)
- Most points: 8,941 – Brett Maher
- Most field goals: 3,140 – Brett Maher
- Most field goals attempted: 7,072 – Brett Maher
- Most three-pointers: 1,162 – Brett Maher
- Most three's attempted: 2,835 – Brett Maher
- Most free throws: 2,037 – Mark Davis
- Most free throws attempted: 2,888 – Mark Davis
- Most rebounds: 5,200 (3,221 def; 1,979 off) – Mark Davis
- Most assists: 2,267 – Brett Maher
- Most steals: 703 – Brett Maher
- Most blocks: 301 – Mark Davis
- Most games coached: 365 – Phil Smyth (1998–2007/08)
- Most wins as coach: 205 – Phil Smyth
- Most losses as coach: 160 – Phil Smyth
- Most championships as a player: 3 – Mark Davis, Brett Maher, Paul Rees, Rupert Sapwell and Jason Williams
- Most Grand Finals as a player: 5 – Mark Davis (1985, 1986, 1994, 1998, 1998–99)
- Most championships as a coach: 3 – Phil Smyth
- Most Grand Finals as a coach: 3 – Phil Smyth
- Highest winning percentage as a coach: 82.8% – Ken Cole (1985–1986, 58 games, 48 wins, 10 losses)

=== Attendances ===
- Largest home attendance (1982–1991): 3,000 (numerous) at the Apollo Stadium.
- Largest home attendance (1992–2019): 8,127 vs Perth Wildcats at the Adelaide Arena, 11 April 2014, NBL Grand Final Game 2.
- Largest home attendance (2019–): 10,029 vs Perth Wildcats at the Adelaide Entertainment Centre, 9 November 2025, Round 8, 2025–26 NBL season.
- Largest away attendance: 13,611 vs Perth Wildcats at the Perth Arena, 14 January 2017, Round 15, 2016–17 NBL season.
- Largest all-time attendance: 18,306 vs Utah Jazz at the Vivint Smart Home Arena (Salt Lake City, Utah, USA), 5 October 2019, NBA vs NBL, 2019 NBL pre-season.

== Current roster ==
Note: Flags indicate national team eligibility at FIBA-sanctioned events. Players may hold other non-FIBA nationalities not displayed.

Adelaide 36ers roster
Players
Coaches

Pos.	No.	Nat.	Name	Ht.	Wt.
G	0	(Australia)	Kenyon, Matt	1.96 m (6 ft 5 in)	91 kg (201 lb)
G	1	(New Zealand)	Cameron, Flynn	1.96 m (6 ft 5 in)	90 kg (198 lb)
G	2	(Australia)	White, Isaac	1.88 m (6 ft 2 in)	85 kg (187 lb)
F/C	7	(South Sudan)	Mathiang, Mangok	2.08 m (6 ft 10 in)	102 kg (225 lb)
G	11	(Australia)	Cotton, Bryce (C)	1.82 m (6 ft 0 in)	76 kg (168 lb)
G	12	(United States)	Jenkins, John (I)	1.93 m (6 ft 4 in)	98 kg (216 lb)
C	14	(Australia)	Griscti, Ben	2.11 m (6 ft 11 in)	110 kg (243 lb)
G	22	(New Zealand)	Rasmussen, Keanu	1.88 m (6 ft 2 in)	86 kg (190 lb)
G	23	(Australia)	Williams, Deonte (DP)	1.98 m (6 ft 6 in)
F	25	(Australia)	Rigoni, Jacob (NRP)	1.97 m (6 ft 6 in)	95 kg (209 lb)
F	31	(Serbia)	Rakocevic, Nick (I)	2.11 m (6 ft 11 in)	102 kg (225 lb)
F	42	(South Sudan)	Kuol, Bul (injured)	2.01 m (6 ft 7 in)	94 kg (207 lb)
G	43	(Australia)	White, Harvey (DP)	1.86 m (6 ft 1 in)	84 kg (185 lb)
G	44	(Australia)	Brown Jr., Raheim (DP)	1.96 m (6 ft 5 in)
F	45	(United States)	Cheatham, Zylan (I)	2.03 m (6 ft 8 in)	105 kg (231 lb)

Head coach

- (Australia) Trevor Gleeson

Assistant coach(es)

- (Australia) Jakob Dorricott
- (Serbia) Marko Marinović
- (Australia) Kerry Williams

Legend

- (C) Team captain
- (DP) Development player
- (IN) Inactive
- (I) Import player
- (NRP) Nominated replacement player
- (NS) Next Star player
- Injured

- Roster
Updated: 20 November 2026

== Retired numbers ==
The five retired numbers of the Adelaide 36ers at Adelaide Entertainment Centre, January 2026

- 4 Darryl Pearce (258 games – 1982–1991)
- 5 Brett Maher (526 games – 1992–2009)
- 15 Al Green (164 games – 1985–1990)
- 21 Daniel Johnson (366 games – 2010–2023)
- 33 Mark Davis (482 games – 1985–2001)

In November 2015, the 36ers retired Darryl Pearce's No. 4 jersey and Al Green's No. 15 jersey alongside the already retired No. 5 of Brett Maher and No. 33 of Mark Davis. In January 2025, the 36ers retired Daniel Johnson's No. 21 jersey.

== Notable players ==
Note: Flags indicate national team eligibility at FIBA-sanctioned events. Players may hold other non-FIBA nationalities not displayed.

Criteria

To appear in this section a player must have either:

- Set a club record or won an individual award while at the club
- Played at least one official international match for their national team at any time
- Played at least one official NBA match at any time.

- (Australia) Peter Ali
- (New Zealand) B. J. Anthony
- (Australia) Cameron Bairstow
- (Australia) Adam Ballinger
- (New Zealand) Everard Bartlett
- (Australia) Chris Blakemore
- (Australia) Mark Bradtke
- (United States) Kevin Brooks
- (United States) Troy Brown Jr.
- (Australia) Aaron Bruce
- (United States) Rick Brunson
- (Australia) Jason Cadee
- (New Zealand) Flynn Cameron
- (Australia) Rhys Carter
- (Australia) Martin Cattalini
- (United States) Zylan Cheatham
- (United States) Josh Childress
- (United States) Ian Clark
- (United States) Antonius Cleveland
- (United States) / (Australia) Lanard Copeland
- (United States) / (Australia) Bryce Cotton
- (Australia) Mitch Creek
- (Australia) Tom Daly
- (United States) Kendric Davis
- (United States) / (Australia) Mark Davis
- (South Sudan) / (Australia) Sunday Dech
- (Australia) Anthony Drmic
- (United States) Jo Jo English
- (United States) / (Nigeria) Ebi Ere
- (United States) Terrance Ferguson
- (United States) Trentyn Flowers
- (Australia) Oscar Forman
- (United States) Robert Franks
- (Australia) Harry Froling
- (Australia) Adam Gibson
- (Australia) Josh Giddey
- (United States) / (Australia) Al Green
- (United States) Dusty Hannahs
- (United States) Montrezl Harrell
- (New Zealand) Hyrum Harris
- (United States) / (Antigua and Barbuda) Julius Hodge
- (Australia) Matt Hodgson
- (Australia) Jacob Holmes
- (New Zealand) Nick Horvath
- (Australia) Isaac Humphries
- (United States) John Jenkins
- (Australia) Daniel Johnson
- (United States) / (Syria) Trey Kell
- (Australia) Brett Maher
- (United States) Jarell Martin
- (South Sudan) / (Australia) Mangok Mathiang
- (South Sudan) / (Australia) Lat Mayen
- (Australia) Mitch McCarron
- (Australia) Mike McKay
- (Australia) Jack McVeigh
- (United States) / (Australia) Darnell Mee
- (United States) Ramone Moore
- (Australia) Brock Motum
- (Australia) Mark Nash
- (Australia) Scott Ninnis
- (Australia) Lachlan Olbrich
- (United States) Brandon Paul
- (Australia) Darryl Pearce
- (Australia) Anthony Petrie
- (United States) / (Ukraine) Jerome Randle
- (Australia) Paul Rees
- (Australia) Paul Rogers
- (United States) / (Australia) Robert Rose
- (United States) / (Australia) Dusty Rychart
- (Australia) Luke Schenscher
- (United States) Donald Sloan
- (New Zealand) Tohi Smith-Milner
- (Australia) Phil Smyth
- (Australia) Nathan Sobey
- (United States) Charles Thomas
- (United States Virgin Islands) Leon Trimmingham
- (Australia) Dejan Vasiljevic
- (New Zealand) Corey Webster
- (Australia) Brett Wheeler
- (Australia) Isaac White
- (United States) / (North Macedonia) Jacob Wiley
- (United States) / (Finland) Jamar Wilson
- (New Zealand) Pāora Winitana

=== All-time team ===
In November 2015, Adelaide's daily newspaper The Advertiser ran an online poll to find the fans favourite / best ever team. The results were as follows:

Pos.	Starter	Bench	Bench	Reserves
C	Mark Bradtke (35.71%)	Bill Jones (25.17%)	Paul Rees (23.81%)	Daniel Johnson (11.22%)
PF	Mark Davis (83.28%)	Kevin Brooks (11.15%)	Adam Ballinger (2.79%)	Anthony Petrie (1.74%)
SF	Robert Rose (62.15%)	Martin Cattalini (26.74%)	Peter Ali (4.86%)	Dwayne Nelson (3.47%)
SG	Brett Maher (72.64%)	Darryl Pearce (19.59%)	Willie Farley (5.74%)	Mike McKay (1.35%)
PG	Darnell Mee (42.81%)	Al Green (37.58%)	Phil Smyth (16.99%)	Jerome Randle (2.61%)

- Coach – Phil Smyth

== Championship Teams ==
The Adelaide 36ers have hosted 8 NBL Grand Final games, 2 at the Apollo Stadium and 6 at the Clipsal Powerhouse (Titanium Security Arena). The 36ers have won 5 of those 8 games with their only home losses being Game 2 of the 1986 series against Brisbane, Game 1 of 1994 against North Melbourne, and Game 2 of 1998–99 against Victoria.

=== 1986 NBL championship team ===
The Adelaide 36ers won their first NBL championship in 1986. The team, known as the West End 36ers after sponsorship from the South Australian Brewing Company, had a 24–2 regular season record which included becoming the first team to go through the regular season unbeaten at home with a 13–0 record at the Apollo Stadium, earning them the nickname "Invincibles" given by leading basketball journalist Boti Nagy. The 36ers defeated the Illawarra Hawks in a one-sided Semi-final before gaining revenge for the 1985 Grand Final loss to the Brisbane Bullets by defeating them in the NBL's first ever three game Grand Final series 2–1.

In 2012 the NBL announced that the 1986 Adelaide 36ers were voted as the greatest single season team in league history.

Game 1 – 36ers 122 def. Bullets 119 (OT) @ Brisbane Entertainment Centre
Game 2 – Bullets 104 def. 36ers 83 @ Apollo Stadium
Game 3 – 36ers 113 def. Bullets 91 @ Apollo Stadium

- Head coach: Ken Cole
- Assistant coach: Don Shipway

Pos.	Starter	Bench	Bench	Reserves
C	Bill Jones (c)
PF	Mark Davis	Dwayne Nelson
SF	Peter Ali		Peter Sexton	Mark Sykes
SG	Darryl Pearce	Mike McKay	Scott Ninnis
PG	Al Green	Ray Wood	David Spear

=== 1998 NBL championship team ===
Adelaide def. South East Melbourne Magic 2–0.
Game 1 – 36ers 100 def. Magic 93 @ Clipsal Powerhouse
Game 2 – 36ers 90 def. Magic 62 @ National Tennis Centre

- Head coach: Phil Smyth
- Assistant coach: Steve Breheny

Pos.	Starter	Bench	Bench	Reserves
C	Paul Rees
PF	Martin Cattalini	Mark Davis	Dean Brogan
SF	Kevin Brooks	Rupert Sapwell
SG	Brett Maher (c)	Scott Ninnis		Jason Williams
PG	Darnell Mee	John Rillie		Paul Bauer

=== 1998–99 NBL championship team ===
Adelaide def. Victoria Titans 2–1.
Game 1 – 36ers 104 def. Titans 94 @ National Tennis Centre
Game 2 – Titans 88 def. 36ers 82 @ Clipsal Powerhouse
Game 3 – 36ers 80 def. Titans 69 @ Clipsal Powerhouse

- Head coach: Phil Smyth
- Assistant coach: Steve Breheny
- Assistant coach: Scott Ninnis

Pos.	Starter	Bench	Bench	Reserves
C	Paul Rees	David Stiff
PF	Martin Cattalini	Mark Davis
SF	Kevin Brooks	Rupert Sapwell
SG	Brett Maher (c)		Jason Williams
PG	Darnell Mee		Paul Bauer

=== 2001–02 NBL championship team ===
In Game 3 of the 2001–02 NBL Grand Final series at the Clipsal Powerhouse, the 36ers broke their own NBL record for the most points scored in an NBL Grand Final game of 122 (set in Game 1 of 1986) when they scored 125 points to defeat the West Sydney Razorbacks by 18 points. This record still stands as of the 2016 NBL Grand Final.

Adelaide def. West Sydney Razorbacks 2–1.
Game 1 – 36ers 106 def. Razorbacks 97 @ Clipsal Powerhouse
Game 2 – Razorbacks 103 def. 36ers 100 @ State Sports Centre
Game 3 – 36ers 125 def. Razorbacks 107 @ Clipsal Powerhouse

- Head coach: Phil Smyth
- Assistant coach: Steve Breheny
- Assistant coach: Scott Ninnis

Pos.	Starter	Bench	Bench	Reserves
C	Paul Rees
PF	David Stiff	Matt Garrison	Jacob Holmes
SF	Mark Nash	Rupert Sapwell	Oscar Forman
SG	Willie Farley	Jason Williams
PG	Brett Maher (c)

== Preseason games against NBA teams ==
The 36ers have played several preseason games in the United States against National Basketball Association (NBA) teams. The first game against an NBA team was played on 5 October 2018, when Adelaide lost to Utah Jazz.

On 2 October 2022, the 36ers became the first NBL team to beat an NBA team when they defeated the Phoenix Suns.

9Go!

5 October 2018
19:00

boxscore

Adelaide 36ers (Australia)	99–129	(United States) Utah Jazz
Scoring by quarter: 31–28, 23–38, 32–28, 13–35
Pts: Sobey 23; Rebs: Drmic 9 Asts: three players 4		Pts: Mitchell 18; Rebs: Udoh 10; Asts: Ingles 7

Vivint Smart Home Arena, Salt Lake City, United States
Attendance: 18,074
Referees: Mark Ayotte, Gary Zielinski, CJ Washington

SBS on Demand

5 October 2019
19:00

boxscore

Adelaide 36ers (Australia)	81–133	(United States) Utah Jazz
Scoring by quarter: 18–28, 21–32, 24–44, 18–29
Pts: Randle 18; Rebs: Froling 11; Asts: Dillon 4		Pts: Bradley 18; Rebs: Bradley 10; Asts: Ingles, O'Neale 6

Vivint Smart Home Arena, Salt Lake City, United States
Attendance: 18,306
Referees: Derek Richardson, Ken Mauer, Phenizee Ransom

Kayo Freebies

2 October 2022
19:00

Boxscore

Adelaide 36ers (Australia)	134–124	(United States) Phoenix Suns
Scoring by quarter: 33–28, 38–31, 25–31, 38–34
Pts: Randall 35; Rebs: Franks 7 Asts: McCarron 16		Pts: Payne 23; Rebs: Bridges 7 Asts: Paul 12

Footprint Center, Phoenix, Arizona
Attendance: 15,152
Referees: Bill Kennedy, Justin Van Duyne, Dannica Mosher

6 October 2022

Boxscore

Adelaide 36ers (Australia)	98–131	(United States) Oklahoma City Thunder
Scoring by quarter: 16–35, 27–38, 27–35, 28–23
Pts: Randall 27; Rebs: Franks 7 Asts: Randall 8		Pts: Mann 23; Rebs: Williams 11; Asts: Giddey 6

Paycom Center, Oklahoma City, OK
Referees: Derrick Collins, Pat Fraher, Jenna Schroeder
