= Australia Live TV =

Australia Live TV is an Australia-based online television network run from Chapel Lane Studios in Hindmarsh, South Australia, Adelaide

The company started with one sports Internet television show KG and the General but now hosts several shows

== Programming ==
List of programs broadcast by Australia Live TV:

- Two Up Front – Soccer show. Hosted by John Kosmina and Ross Aloisi. Time: Thursdays 6-7 p.m.
- KG and The General – Australia's first live internet sports show covering national and international sports. Time: Monday – Friday 3-5 p.m.
- Inside the Game – All things basketball NBL Hosted by 'KB' Kevin Brooks (basketball) & Brett Maher Time: Friday 6-7 p.m.
- Amateur Footy – SA Amateur Footy show. Hosted by K. G. Cunningham and 'The General' Phil Smyth. Time: Friday 5-6 p.m.
- Mobile Rolling – Harness racing show. Hosted by David Aldred. Time: Thursdays 5-6 p.m.
- Open House – Real Estate show sponsored by Brock Harcourts. Hosted by Greg Moulton. Time: Fridays 12-1 p.m.
- Qwoff TV – Australian wine show. Hosted by Justin 'JD' and Andre Eikmeier.
- Rural Live TV – Rural news, weather, technology and market updates. Hosted by Rob Kerin and Will Goodings. Time: Mondays and Thursdays 1-2 p.m.
- Xtreme Sports Hour – Extreme sports show. Hosted by Nathan Strempel. Time: Wednesdays 6-7 p.m.

Launched in March 2009. Finished production in December 2010.

== See also ==
- Subscription television in Australia
- Internet television in Australia
