= Kevin Brooks (basketball) =

American basketball player (born 1969)

Personal information
- Born: October 12, 1969 (age 57) Beaufort, South Carolina, U.S.
- Listed height: 6 ft 6 in (1.98 m)
- Listed weight: 200 lb (91 kg)

Career information
- High school: White Castle (White Castle, Louisiana)
- College: Louisiana (1987–1991)
- NBA draft: 1991: 1st round, 18th overall pick
- Drafted by: Milwaukee Bucks
- Playing career: 1991–2004
- Position: Small forward
- Number: 43
- Coaching career: 2005–present

Career history

Playing
- 1991–1994: Denver Nuggets
- 1994–1995: Rapid City Thrillers
- 1995: Shreveport Crawdads
- 1995–1996: San Diego Wildcards
- 1997–1998: AA Guaru
- 1998: Atenas de Córdoba
- 1998–1999: Adelaide 36ers
- 1999: Atenas de Córdoba
- 1999–2000: Sydney Kings
- 2000–2001: Adelaide 36ers
- 2001–2002: Södertälje BBK
- 2002: Wellington Saints
- 2003–2004: Hunter Pirates

Coaching
- 2005: Woodville Warriors
- 2005: Adelaide 36ers (assistant)
- 2006: Wollongong Hawks (assistant)
- 2007: Wellington Saints
- 2013–2020: Adelaide 36ers (assistant)

Career highlights
- 2x NBL champion (1998, 1999); NBL Grand Final MVP (1998); All–NBL First Team (1999); All-NBL Second Team (1998); 3× First-team All-American South (1989–1991); Second-team All-American South (1988); American South Newcomer of the Year (1988)
- Stats at NBA.com
- Stats at Basketball Reference

Kevin Brooks (born October 12, 1969) is an American professional basketball coach and former player. Born in Beaufort, South Carolina, Brooks is a graduate of White Castle High School in White Castle, Louisiana and graduated from the University of Louisiana at Lafayette, then named the University of Southwestern Louisiana.

== Career ==
=== NBA ===
Brooks was drafted by the Milwaukee Bucks in the first round as the 18th pick of the 1991 NBA draft. Traded to the Denver Nuggets, he played 126 games in three seasons from 1991 to 1994, averaging 3.3 points, 1.1 rebounds and 0.4 assists per game.

=== NBL ===
With the Adelaide 36ers looking for a second import player for the 1998 NBL season, Brooks' friend and former Nuggets teammate Darnell Mee recommended him to the 36ers and they signed the former Nuggets forward to play for two seasons. After his first training session with the team, Brooks' teammates thought he would not last a week in the NBL with his shooting style that saw him release the ball almost from behind his head. However, they soon found Brooks was for real when he scored 20 points in his debut NBL game against the Townsville Suns before going on to average 19.1 points, 6.7 rebounds and 1.3 assists in 31 games. Under the rookie coaching of Australian basketball legend Phil Smyth, and with others such as Darnell Mee, team captain and 1996 Olympian Brett Maher, former Perth Wildcats championship forward Martin Cattalini, centre Paul Rees and veteran forward Mark Davis, Brooks went on to win back-to-back championships in 1998 and 1999. Brooks was named the NBL Grand Final MVP in 1998 during the 36ers 2–0 sweep of the South East Melbourne Magic, averaging 22.5 points, 7 rebounds, 1.5 blocks and 1.5 assists over the series.

With largely the same team as in 1998, Brooks and the 36ers became back to back champions by winning the 1998–99 Grand Final series 2–1 over the Victoria Titans (the NBL changed from a winter to summer season at the conclusion of the 1998 season). In his second season in Australia, Brooks continued his good form averaging 17.3 points, 6.4 rebounds and 1.7 assists in 33 games and was named in the All-NBL First Team. In 98 games for the 36ers (1998–99 and 2000–01) Brooks averaged 18.8 points, 6.6 rebounds and 1.6 assists in 98 games with the 36ers.

In 1999–2000, the NBL refused to let Adelaide register Brooks as it was believed doing so would put the 36ers over the leagues salary cap. Instead Brooks played for the Sydney Kings. While he impressed for the Kings under the coaching of Brett Brown, Brooks never seemed settled and at the end of the season returned to the 36ers for 2000–01. After the team reached the Semi-finals, Brooks was off to Södertälje BBK in Sweden for a season before returning down under, this time to New Zealand when he joined the Wellington Saints for 2002.

Brooks then moved to back to the NBL and the Newcastle based Hunter Pirates in 2003–04. In his international career, Brooks has competed in France, Argentina, Brazil, Australia, Sweden & New Zealand.

== Coaching ==
Brooks started his managerial career as head coach of the Australian Basketball Association Woodville Warriors in Adelaide where in his inaugural year, led the Warriors to the 2005 ABA championship. In June 2005 he joined the Stamford Grand Basketball Academy in Adelaide, South Australia as first an assistant coach and then head coach the following season, training a future player-base for the 36ers.

Shortly thereafter, Brooks accepted the position of 2nd assistant coach with his former team, the Adelaide 36ers in the NBL. The following season, he became the 1st assistant coach with the Wollongong Hawks for the next two years. He was also the head coach of his former New Zealand NBL team the Wellington Saints in 2007.

Brooks is currently the Executive Producer and Analyst of a weekly live, internet basketball show on Australia Live TV entitled, Inside the Game, as well as assistant coach for the Pembroke School and head coach at St Paul's College (based in Adelaide) basketball teams. In 2017, Brooks became the head coach of the Nazareth Catholic College basketball program.

On 21 May 2013, Brooks signed with the Adelaide 36ers as one of the 2013–14 assistant coaches to new head coach Joey Wright, returning for his second assistant coaching stint with the club. Under Wright, the 36ers went from the bottom of the league in 2012–13, to Grand Finalists in 2013–14. He served as Wright's assistant coach with the 36ers until Wright's departure in 2020. Brooks had been backed by Wright as his successor but lost the role to Conner Henry after an unsuccessful attempt at the role.

== Career stats ==
=== NBA ===
Legend
GP	Games played	GS	Games started	MPG	Minutes per game
FG%	Field goal percentage	3P%	3-point field goal percentage	FT%	Free throw percentage
RPG	Rebounds per game	APG	Assists per game	SPG	Steals per game
BPG	Blocks per game	PPG	Points per game	**Bold**	Career high

==== Regular season ====
Year	Team	GP	GS	MPG	FG%	3P%	FT%	RPG	APG	SPG	BPG	PPG
1991–92	Denver	37	0	7.3	**.443**	.182	.810	1.1	0.3	**0.2**	**0.1**	2.8
1992–93	Denver	**55**	**2**	**10.4**	.399	**.231**	.875	**1.5**	**0.6**	**0.2**	0.0	**4.1**
1993–94	Denver	34	0	5.6	.364	.174	**.900**	0.6	0.1	0.0	**0.1**	2.5
**Career**		126	2	8.2	.401	.200	.859	1.1	0.4	0.1	0.0	3.3

==== Playoffs ====
Year	Team	GP	GS	MPG	FG%	3P%	FT%	RPG	APG	SPG	BPG	PPG
1993–94	Denver	2	0	2.5	.286	.000	.500	1.0	.0	.0	.0	2.5

=== NBL ===
Legend
GP	Games played	GS	Games started	MPG	Minutes per game
FG%	Field goal percentage	3P%	3-point field goal percentage	FT%	Free throw percentage
RPG	Rebounds per game	APG	Assists per game	SPG	Steals per game
BPG	Blocks per game	PPG	Points per game	**Bold**	Career high

†	Denotes season(s) in which Brooks won an NBA championship

Year	Team	GP	GS	MPG	FG%	3P%	FT%	RPG	APG	SPG	BPG	PPG
1998†	Adelaide 36ers	31	31	38.9	**.496**	**.445**	.798	6.7	1.3	**0.7**	**0.6**	19.4
1998–99†	Adelaide 36ers	33	33	**41.6**	.417	.374	.777	6.1	1.5	0.6	0.4	17.3
1999–2000	Sydney Kings	27	27	41.2	.457	.422	.833	6.2	1.5	0.6	**0.6**	16.8
2000–01	Adelaide 36ers	**34**	**34**	39.2	.420	.390	.847	**7.1**	**2.1**	0.4	0.5	**19.6**
2003–04	Hunter Pirates	33	33	37.7	.414	.335	**.898**	5.7	1.8	0.6	0.5	16.8
**Career**		158	158	39.7	.439	.389	.831	6.4	1.7	0.6	0.5	18.0
