= Paul Rees (basketball) =

Australian basketball player (born 1969)

Personal information
- Born: 6 January 1969 (age 57)
- Listed height: 205 cm (6 ft 9 in)
- Listed weight: 115 kg (254 lb)

Career information
- Playing career: 1990–2006
- Position: Centre
- Number: 53

Career history
- 1990–1991: Brisbane Bullets
- 1992–1997: North Melbourne Giants
- 1998–2003: Adelaide 36ers
- 2003–2004: Brisbane Bullets
- 2005–2006: Adelaide 36ers

Career highlights
- 4x NBL champion (1994, 1998, 1999, 2002); NBL Grand Final MVP (1994)

Paul Rees (born 6 January 1969) is a former Australian professional basketball player who played his entire career in the Australian National Basketball League. Rees was known for his presence under the basket and while not blessed with a great jumping ability he was able to use his physical size to his advantage and was considered to be a strong rebounder.

== Professional career ==
Rees, a 6-foot-9-inch (206 cm) tall Centre, made his NBL debut in the 1990 season for the Brisbane Bullets. The Bullets made the NBL Grand Final that season but went down two games to one to the Perth Wildcats. After the club failed to make the playoffs in 1991, Rees signed with the North Melbourne Giants.

Rees quickly established himself as the starting centre for the Giants who hadn't made the playoffs since their 1989 championship win over the Canberra Cannons. The team failed to make the post-season in 1992 and only just missed out in 1993 under new American head coach Brett Brown. The 1994 NBL season would see Paul Rees win the first of his four NBL championships when the Giants defeated the Adelaide 36ers by two games to nil in the three-game series. Rees was the NBL Grand Final MVP in 1994, averaging 18.5 points in the two games.

The Giants made it back to back grand final appearances in 1995, this time playing against the Perth Wildcats. Rees series wasn't as successful as the previous year as he averaged only 8.7 points over the three games and the Giants lost the series 1–2 to the Wildcats. 1995 was also the last year that the North Melbourne Giants ever made it to the NBL Grand Final.

Paul Rees played another two seasons in Melbourne before signing with the Adelaide 36ers for the 1998 season. There under new coach Phil Smyth, Rees and the 36ers would both go on to win their second NBL championship when they defeated the South East Melbourne Magic two games to nil in the Grand Final. Rees averaged 7.4 points per game in his first year with the 36ers.

Adelaide would finish the 1998–99 regular season in first place with an 18–8 record with Rees averaging 6.6 points and 4.3 rebounds per game. Both Rees and the 36ers would win their third NBL championship when they defeated the Victoria Titans two games to one in the Grand Final series.

Following Semi-finals appearances in both the 1999–2000 and 2000–01 NBL seasons, the Adelaide 36ers, with Paul Rees maintaining his form but sharing the centre spot with teammate David Stiff (who also played at Power forward), made it back to the NBL grand final in 2001–02 where they faced the West Sydney Razorbacks who were led by Rees's former (1998) 36ers teammate John Rillie. Rees won his fourth NBL championship as the 36ers defeated the Razorbacks two games to one.

The 36ers only reached the elimination finals in 2002–03, following which, after 3 championships and 201 games for Adelaide, he was not offered a new contract. He then decided to move back to his original club, the Brisbane Bullets for the 2003–04 NBL season. The Bullets and Paul Rees made it as far as the Semi-finals before bowing out of a successful season.

Rees moved again after the 2003–04 season, this time moving back to Adelaide and the 36ers. He would spend another two seasons with the club helping them to reach the Quarter-finals in both 2004–05 and 2005–06 before finally retiring from basketball at the age of 37. He played a total of 508 games during his NBL career.

On the "TITLE TOWN: The Adelaide 36ers in the 1990s" documentary, Rees' teammates Rupert Sapwell, Kevin Brooks and Mark Davis told of a number of quirks that he had. These included pulling a muesli bar out of his sock after practice and eating it during warm down stretches, and a ritual of rushing back to the change room during the warm up for a game to check his cards and money in his wallet.

== International career ==
Paul Rees form in winning the 1994 NBL Grand Final MVP award was rewarded when was selected as a member of the Australian Boomers team that finished in 5th place at the 1994 FIBA World Championship. Playing as the 3rd centre behind team stalwarts Mark Bradtke and Ray Borner, Rees only played 2 games in the tournament averaging 4 points, 1 rebound and 1 assist per game in just 10 minutes of court time.

In March 1995, Rees played 3 games for the Boomers in the 5-game series against the touring Magic Johnson All-Stars.

== Honour roll ==
NBL career:	1990–2006
NBL Grand Final appearances:	6 (1990, 1994, 1995, 1998, 1998/99, 2001/02)
NBL Championships:	4 (1994, 1998, 1998/99, 2001/02)
NBL Finals appearances:	16 (1990, 1992–2006)

== NBL career stats ==
Games:	508 (88 Bris, 158 NMG, 262 Adl)
Rebounds:	4.7 pg
Points:	4,013 (7.8 pg)
Free Throws:	746 / 1,125 (66.3%)
Field goals:	1,605 / 2,939 (54.6%)
3 Points:	19 / 61 (31.1%)
Steals:	0.4 pg
Assists:	1.1 pg
Blocks:	0.7 pg
