= Steve Breheny =

Australian basketball player

Personal information
- Born: 21 June 1954 (age 72)
- Listed height: 192 cm (6 ft 4 in)

Career history

Playing
- 1979–1984: St. Kilda Saints
- 1985: Geelong Cats
- 1986: Coburg Giants

Coaching
- 1987–1988: Coburg Cougars
- 1989–1991: Canberra Cannons
- 1992–1993: Geelong Supercats
- 2010–2011: Adelaide Lightning

Career highlights
- As player: 2x NBL champion (1979, 1980)

Steve Breheny (born 21 June 1954) is an Australian basketball player and coach. He played eight years in the National Basketball League (NBL) for the Coburg Giants, the Geelong Cats and the St. Kilda Saints. At international level, he played for Australia at the 1980 Summer Olympics and the 1982 FIBA World Championship. After retiring, Breheny coached at NBL level for the Canberra Cannons and the Geelong Supercats. He also led Women's National Basketball League (WNBL) teams Coburg Cougars and Adelaide Lightning.

== Playing career ==
=== Club career ===
Breheny played for the St. Kilda Saints between 1979 and 1984. In 1985, he joined the Geelong Cats for one season, before finishing his NBL career in 1987 for the Coburg Giants.

=== International career ===
He competed in the men's tournament at the 1980 Summer Olympics.

== Coaching career ==
After retiring from playing, Breheny took on the head coach role at Women's National Basketball League (WNBL) team Coburg Cougars. He led the Cougars in 1986 and 1987, finishing runners-up in the 1987 WNBL season.

In 1989, Breheny was appointed coach of the Canberra Cannons. Coaching in a semifinal against the Sydney Kings in September 1989, Breheny was charged with headbutting Kings player Damian Keogh. The NBL judiciary suspended Breheny until May 1990.

Breheny took charge of his former team Geelong Supercats (formerly Geelong Cats) in 1992. The team had experienced a high level of turnover and was not expected to do well. In 1993, Breheny resigned as coach of the Supercats after a dispute over his handling of import player Adrian Branch.

During the 2010–11 WNBL season, Breheny led the Adelaide Lightning.
