= David Stiff (basketball) =

Australian basketball player

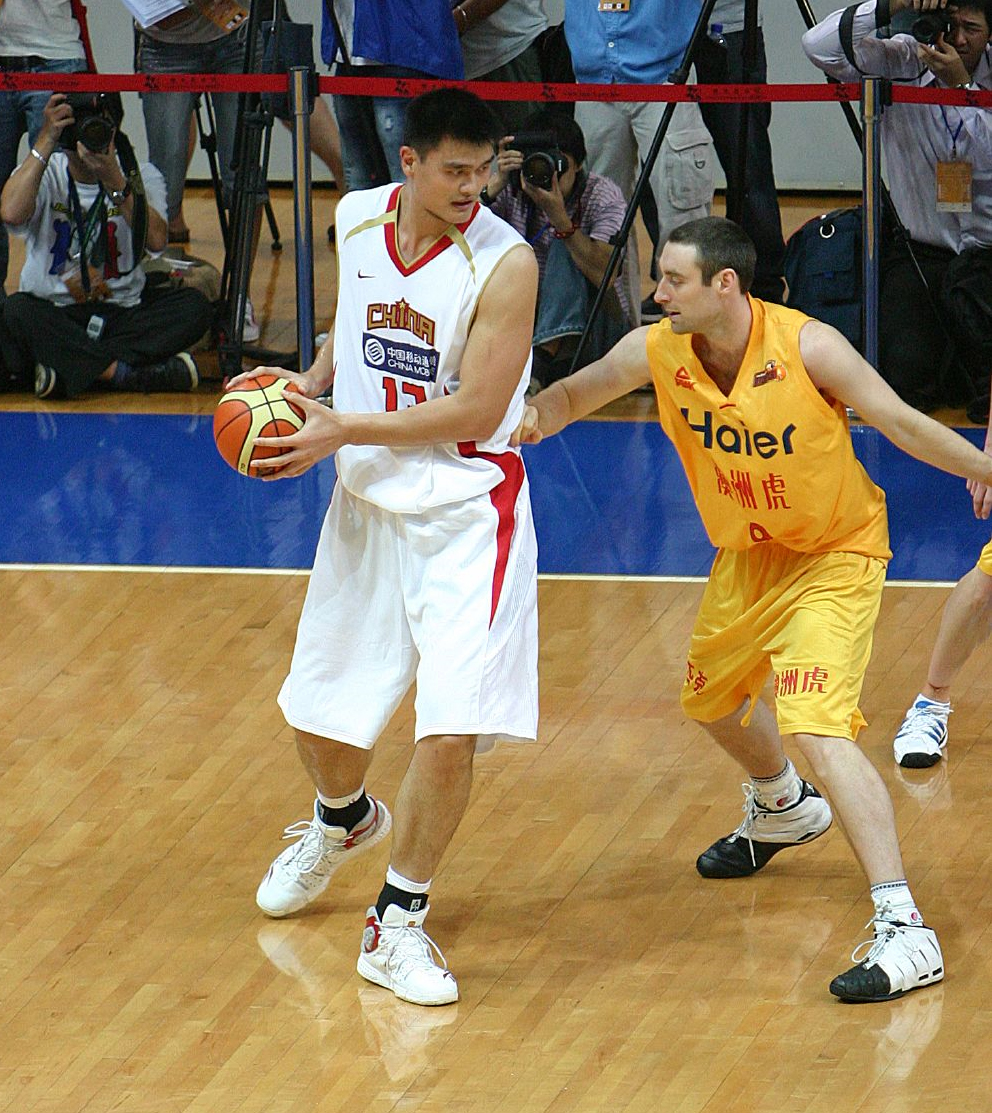
- Stiff (right) in September 2007, defending Yao Ming in an exhibition game

Personal information
- Born: 8 February 1972 (age 54) Melbourne, Victoria, Australia
- Listed height: 205 cm (6 ft 9 in)
- Listed weight: 102 kg (225 lb)

Career information
- College: Boston (1992–1995)
- Playing career: 1992–2008
- Position: Power forward

Career history
- 1992; 1995–1996: Hobart Devils
- 1997–1998: North Melbourne Giants
- 1998–2002: Adelaide 36ers
- 1999; 2002: Petronas
- 2002–2004: Sydney Kings
- 2004–2008: Melbourne Tigers

Career highlights
- 6× NBL champion (1999, 2002–2004, 2006, 2008)

David Stiff (born 8 February 1972) is an Australian former professional basketball player who played 15 seasons in the National Basketball League (NBL). He won six championships with three teams to sit equal first for most individual championships in league history.

== Career life ==
Stiff debuted in the NBL in 1992 with the Hobart Devils. He then had a three-year college basketball stint in the United States with the Boston Terriers. Upon returning to Australia, he re-joined the Devils and played a further two seasons. After playing for the North Melbourne Giants in 1997 and 1998, he joined the Adelaide 36ers for the 1998–99 season and won his first championship.

He continued on with Adelaide for another three seasons, where in 2002 he won his second championship. Over the next two seasons, Stiff earned a personal three-peat as a member of the Sydney Kings' back-to-back championship teams. In 2004, he joined the Melbourne Tigers and won his fifth championship in his second season. In 2007–08, in what was his 15th and final season, Stiff won his sixth championship as a member of the Tigers. His six NBL championships are equal first for most individual championships in league history alongside C. J. Bruton, Damian Martin and Jesse Wagstaff. In 453 career games, he averaged 9.6 points and 6.1 rebounds per game.
