= Mark Nash (basketball) =

Australian basketball player

Personal information
- Born: 25 February 1976 (age 49); Launceston, Australia
- Listed height: 198 cm (6 ft 6 in)
- Listed weight: 99 kg (218 lb)

Career information
- Playing career: 1994–2012
- Position: Power forward

Career history
- 1994: Hobart Chargers
- 1994–1996: Hobart Devils
- 1997: Hobart Chargers
- 1998–2000: Brisbane Bullets
- 2000–2007: Adelaide 36ers
- 2005; 2007–2012: Hobart Chargers

Career highlights
- All-ABA Game (1996); ABA Youth Player of the Year (1997); NBL Champion (2002)

Mark Jonathan Nash (born 25 February 1976) is an Australian basketball player. The junior club that he played for was Kingborough District, in Tasmania. A well-known player in the Australian Basketball Association born in Launceston, Australia, he played for the Australia Under-20 team in 1995 at the Junior World Championships. He continued to play well in the Association, and was given a chance to play in the All-ABA team that year, and then won the ABA Youth Player of the Year in 1996. He was recruited by the Hobart Devils at the start on the 1996 season.

He then had a year back in the ABA, before being signed for the Brisbane Bullets in 1998. He was then signed by the Adelaide 36ers. He competed for the Australian Boomers at the East Asian and Goodwill Games in 2001. He won an NBL Championship with the Adelaide 36ers in the 2002 season. After playing his 300th NBL game in 2006 he moved back home to Tasmania in 2007 to play for the Hobart Chargers before retiring after the 2009 season.
