= Ken Cole (basketball) =

Australian basketball player and coach (1943–2026)

Personal information
- Born: 15 October 1943 Sydney, New South Wales, Australia
- Died: 15 March 2026 (aged 82)
- Listed height: 204 cm (6 ft 8 in)
- Listed weight: 88 kg (194 lb)
- Positions: Small forward, shooting guard

Career history

Coaching
- 1983–1984: West Adelaide Bearcats
- 1985–1986: Adelaide 36ers
- 1987: Sydney Supersonics
- 1988–1991: Newcastle Falcons

Career highlights
- As head coach: NBL champion (1986); NBL Coach of the Year (1986)

Kenneth Frank Cole (15 October 1943 – 15 March 2026) was an Australian professional basketball coach and player. He represented the Australian national team as a player at the 1964 Summer Olympics. Cole was a head coach in the National Basketball League (NBL) for the West Adelaide Bearcats, Adelaide 36ers, Sydney Supersonics and Newcastle Falcons. He won an NBL championship and was selected as the NBL Coach of the Year with the 36ers in 1986.

== Playing career ==
Cole competed in the men's tournament at the 1964 Summer Olympics with the Australian national basketball team. He was selected for the Australian team in preparation for the 1968 Summer Olympics but the team lost during the qualifying tournament.

Cole was the player-coach for the St. Kilda Saints for five seasons in the early 1970s. At the state level, Cole represented New South Wales from 1961 to 1964, Tasmania in 1965, Victoria from 1966 to 1971, and South Australia in 1972. He toured the United States with the New York Nationals but he was deemed as a professional when he returned to Australia and lost his amateur status.

Cole played the forward and guard positions.

== Coaching career ==
Cole began his National Basketball League (NBL) coaching career with the West Adelaide Bearcats in 1983. The Bearcats merged with the Adelaide 36ers at the end of the 1984 season and Cole was retained as head coach. He led the 36ers to the 1985 NBL Finals during his first season. The 36ers set a 24–2 record during the 1986 season and were nicknamed "The Invincibles." On 14 September 1986, Cole smoked half a joint of marijuana after a victory over the Brisbane Bullets and was sacked by the club committee. On 18 September, he was reinstated for the 1986 NBL Finals after his players lobbied the committee but was suspended for three matches and told he would not be retained for the following season. Cole led the 36ers to the league championship and was selected as the NBL Coach of the Year.

Cole also coached for the Sydney Supersonics and Newcastle Falcons before he retired from coaching.

== Legacy ==
Cole was nicknamed "Old King Cole" and was known for his "vitriolic attacks" on referees. He regularly wore full-length fur coats and cowboy hats as his sideline attire.

In 2012, Cole was selected to become a member of the Australian Basketball Hall of Fame.

Cole returned to the 36ers in 2018 when he was appointed as team president. He was inducted into the Adelaide 36ers Hall of Fame in 2021.

== Personal life ==
Cole was married to Pauline and had three children.

Cole died on 15 March 2026, at the age of 82, after a decade-long battle with cancer. The 36ers wore black tape with "Ken" written on them on their jerseys during the 2026 NBL Finals in his honour.
