= Mike McKay (basketball) =

Australian basketball player

Personal information
- Born: 15 October 1965 (age 60) Adelaide, South Australia, Australia
- Listed height: 193 cm (6 ft 4 in)
- Listed weight: 92 kg (203 lb)

Career information
- Playing career: 1983–2000
- Position: Shooting guard / small forward

Career history
- 1983–1984: West Adelaide Bearcats
- 1985–1995: Adelaide 36ers
- 1996–1997: Brisbane Bullets
- 1998–1999: Canberra Cannons
- 1999–2000: Wollongong Hawks

Career highlights
- NBL champion (1986); NBL Rookie of the Year (1985); NBL Best Sixth Man (1996)
- Stats at Basketball Reference

Michael George McKay (born 15 October 1965) is an Australian former professional basketball player. He played most of his career with the Adelaide 36ers of the National Basketball League (NBL), winning the 1986 championship with the team. McKay also played in the NBL for the West Adelaide Bearcats (with whom he started his NBL career in 1983), Brisbane Bullets, Canberra Cannons and the Wollongong Hawks. He was a frequent member of the Australia men's national basketball team during the late 1980s and early 1990s, including being part of the national team at the 1992 Summer Olympics in Barcelona.

== Professional career ==
Mike McKay started his professional career with the West Adelaide Bearcats in 1983. Along with fellow Bearcat players Al Green, Peter Ali and veteran guard Ray Wood, the then 19-year-old joined the Adelaide 36ers in 1985 after the Bearcats pulled out of the NBL at the end of 1984. Under the coaching of his former Bearcats coach Ken Cole, McKay helped the 36ers to its first Grand Final appearance where they lost to the Brisbane Bullets. McKay played in all 28 games in 1985, averaging 12.9 points, 3.4 rebounds and 1.3 assists. McKay won the NBL's Rookie of the Year award despite already having played in the NBL for two previous seasons.

The 36ers would win their first NBL championship in 1986. After compiling a 24–2 record during the regular season, including going 13–0 at Apollo Stadium (the first NBL side to go through a regular season unbeaten at home), the 36ers would reverse the 1985 GF result with a three-game series win over the Bullets. Game 2 of the series saw Adelaide's only defeat of the season at home with the Bullets pulling off an upset 104–83 win. McKay suffered a serious knee injury during the year and was forced to miss about 10 weeks.

Early on, McKay earned the nickname "Mad Max" for sometimes not being able to control his emotions on the basketball court (he was labelled a 'hot head' by some commentators, most notably by Brisbane based television commentator Gary Fleet after his clashes with Leroy Loggins during the 1986 Grand Final series).

McKay would continue to be a star performer for the 36ers until the end of the 1995 NBL season, playing in losing semi-finals in 1987 (Perth Wildcats), 1988 (Canberra Cannons), 1989 (Perth) as well as 1991 and 1995 (Perth), as well as the losing 1994 GF Series against the North Melbourne Giants. With two years still left on his contract, McKay was released by the 36ers at the end of 1995 and he joined the Brisbane Bullets in 1996 where he would win the NBL's inaugural Best Sixth Man award in his first year away from Adelaide. He played two seasons with the Bullets before moving on to two years with the Canberra Cannons (1998–99). After the 1999–2000 NBL season with the Wollongong Hawks, McKay retired from the NBL having played 448 games and averaging 12.7 points during his career.

== International career ==
Mike McKay first won selection for the Australian Boomers in 1989 and went on to represent his country at the 1992 Summer Olympics in Barcelona, Spain. He was also a member of the Boomers who reached the quarter-finals at both the 1990 and 1994 FIBA Basketball World Cup, finishing 7th in 1990 in Argentina and 5th in 1994 in Canada.

== Media ==
Starting in the 2012-13 NBL season, Mike McKay is an expert commentator for the NBL's online game streaming subscription service NBL.TV at Adelaide 36ers home games at the Adelaide Arena.

== Personal life ==
As of 2016 Mike McKay still lives in Adelaide where he is the Accounts Manager for the Workwear Group.

== NBL career stats ==
Legend
GP	Games played	GS	Games started	MPG	Minutes per game
FG%	Field goal percentage	3P%	3-point field goal percentage	FT%	Free throw percentage
RPG	Rebounds per game	APG	Assists per game	SPG	Steals per game
BPG	Blocks per game	PPG	Points per game	**Bold**	Career high

†	Denotes season(s) in which McKay won an NBL championship

Year	Team	GP	GS	MPG	FG%	3P%	FT%	RPG	APG	SPG	BPG	PPG
1983	West Adelaide Bearcats	20	0	NA	.390	NA	.600	0.6	0.1	0.1	0.0	1.9
1984	West Adelaide Bearcats	18	0	NA	.391	.188	.733	2.7	1.2	0.3	0.3	6.8
1985	Adelaide 36ers	28	0	NA	.492	.472	.590	3.4	1.3	0.9	0.1	12.9
1986†	Adelaide 36ers	30	1	NA	.465	.447	.750	2.3	1.2	0.6	0.4	13.6
1987	Adelaide 36ers	26	NA	27.3	.422	.363	.709	3.1	1.6	1.0	0.2	14.9
1988	Adelaide 36ers	20	NA	16.8	.398	.356	.838	1.9	1.4	0.8	0.1	9.4
1989	Adelaide 36ers	26	NA	28.4	.396	.321	.753	2.9	2.9	1.2	0.4	13.5
1990	Adelaide 36ers	24	NA	NA	.457	.470	.686	2.5	3.2	0.0	0.0	13.7
1991	Adelaide 36ers	28	NA	31.8	**.498**	.457	.840	3.0	3.4	**1.3**	0.2	**19.6**
1992	Adelaide 36ers	24	24	38.1	.390	.373	.800	4.3	3.0	**1.3**	0.1	18.5
1993	Adelaide 36ers	28	28	41.0	.397	.389	.789	**6.0**	**3.5**	**1.3**	0.1	13.8
1994	Adelaide 36ers	**31**	NA	23.8	.398	.356	.742	3.5	2.4	0.9	0.1	8.2
1995	Adelaide 36ers	25	0	23.2	.373	.347	.762	2.0	1.8	0.6	0.1	7.1
1996	Brisbane Bullets	29	NA	36.0	.433	.379	.821	4.1	2.8	0.9	0.1	17.6
1997	Brisbane Bullets	7	NA	35.2	.439	.281	**1.000**	5.0	2.7	0.9	**0.9**	18.6
1998	Canberra Cannons	30	**30**	38.9	.458	**.476**	.904	3.7	2.4	0.9	0.1	15.0
1998–99	Canberra Cannons	26	26	**41.9**	.414	.373	.803	4.3	3.3	0.8	0.2	17.2
1999–2000	Wollongong Hawks	28	NA	20.4	.346	.317	.955	1.9	1.5	0.4	0.0	5.5
**Career**		448	NA	NA	.428	.389	.788	3.2	2.2	0.9	0.2	12.7
