= Adelaide Arena =

Sports venue in Adelaide, Australia

Adelaide 36ers Arena
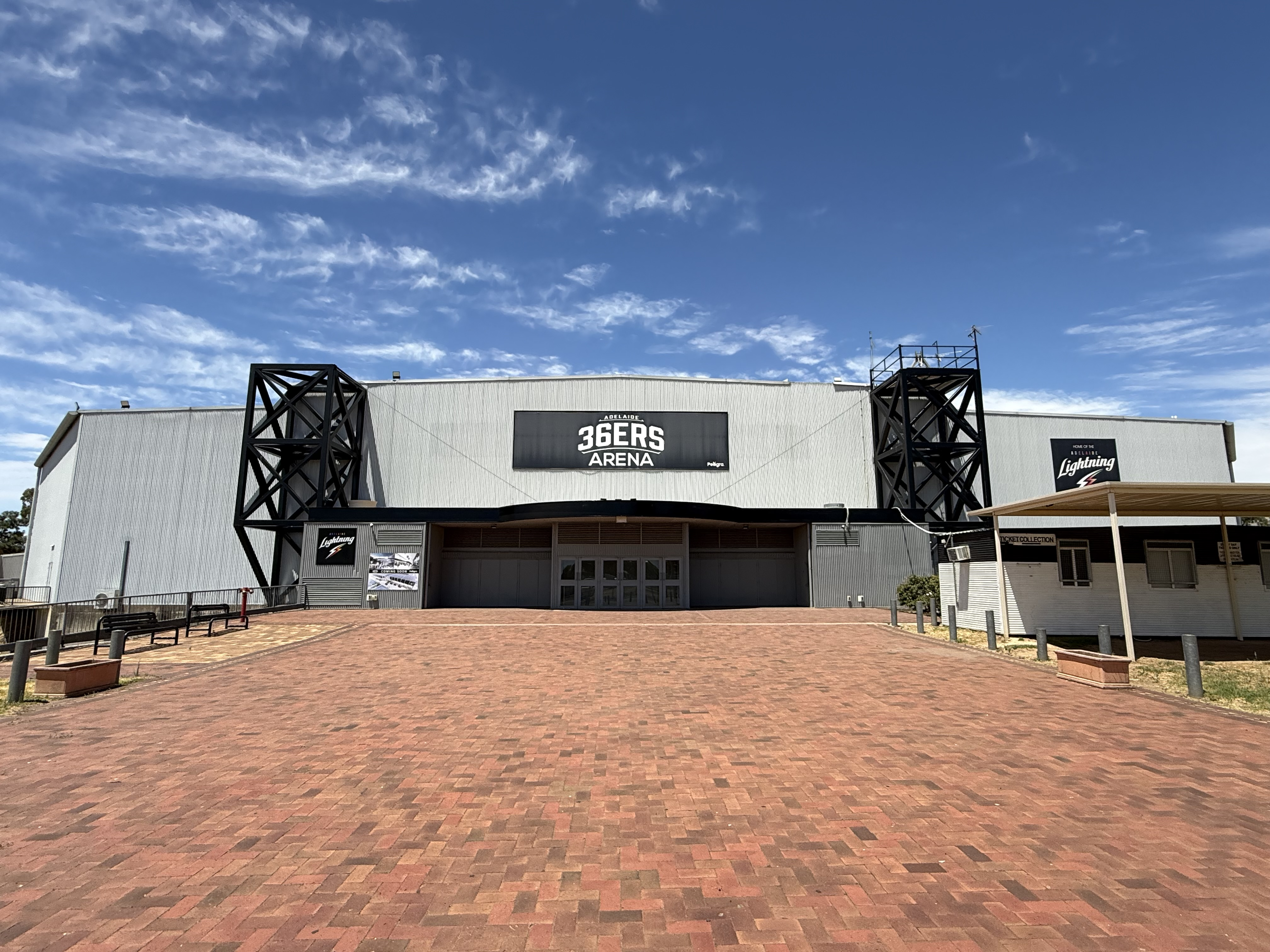
- Adelaide 36ers Arena main entrance, January 2026
- Interactive map of Adelaide 36ers Arena
- Former names: Clipsal Powerhouse (1992–2002); Distinctive Homes Dome (2003–2009); Adelaide Dome (2009–2010); Adelaide Arena (2010–2015)
- Location: 44A Crittenden Road, Findon, Adelaide, South Australia, Australia
- Coordinates: 34°54′1″S 138°32′46″E
- Owner: Beverley Leisure Park
- Operator: BLP
- Capacity: 8,000
- Surface: Canadian Maple
- Record attendance: 8,127 (2014 NBL Grand Final Game 2, Adelaide 36ers vs. Perth Wildcats)

Construction
- Groundbreaking: 1991
- Opened: 4 April 1992
- Cost: AU$16 million ($37.32 million in 2025 dollars)

Tenants
- Adelaide 36ers (NBL) (1992–2019); Adelaide Lightning (WNBL) (1993–2005, 2008–present); Adelaide Thunderbirds (CBT) (1997–2000), (ANZ/NNL) (2016–2017); Adelaide Ravens (CBT) (1997–2000)

Adelaide Arena (known commercially as Adelaide 36ers Arena) is a multipurpose indoor sports stadium located in Findon, an inner western suburb of Adelaide, South Australia.

It is the former home arena for the Adelaide 36ers of the NBL and the current home arena of the Adelaide Lightning of the Women's National Basketball League (WNBL). In the past, it has served as an alternate venue for Adelaide's Suncorp Super Netball team, the Adelaide Thunderbirds.

== History ==
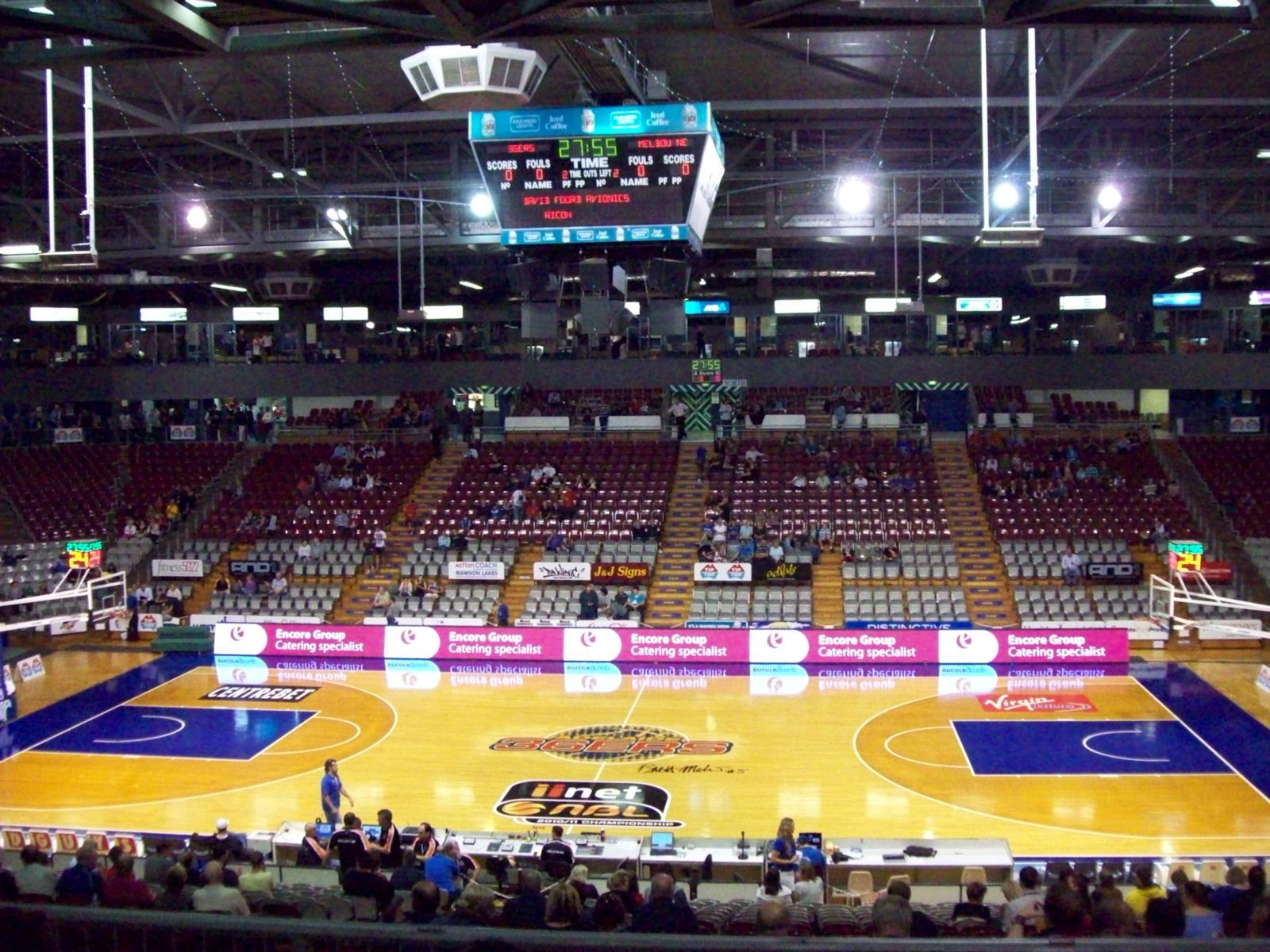
The Brett Maher Court, pictured in February 2011 with the old analog scoreboard in place

Adelaide Arena has been the Adelaide 36ers' home venue since 1992 and the Adelaide Lightning's home for most years since 1993. The arena was built to replace the 36ers former and now-demolished home, Apollo Stadium, which only seated 3,000 people in cramped conditions.

Despite the arena's ability to host more than just sporting events such as basketball and netball, the Government of South Australia placed restrictions on the venue's use when it opened in 1992. Due to the government owning the Adelaide Entertainment Centre, the arena could not be used for such events as concerts, with most major international musical acts performing at the centre or Adelaide's outdoor venues such as the now-demolished Football Park, Memorial Drive or the Adelaide Oval.

The arena was purchased by businessmen Eddy Groves and Mal Hemmerling in 2006 for A$3.95 million. However, in 2012, the Commonwealth Bank took possession of the arena after Eddy Groves had defaulted on the loan. On 3 April 2013, it was announced that Scouts SA and SA Church Basketball had become joint owners of the arena.

The event restrictions were lifted in December 2014 allowing the arena to host non-sporting events, including music concerts. The set-up for concerts at the arena involves retracting the northern bowl seats to allow for a stage with general floor seating covering the Brett Maher Court. With this setup in place, capacity at the arena stays at 8,000 for concerts.

The arena's attendance record of 8,127 was set on 11 April 2014 to see Game 2 of the 2013–14 Grand Final series when the 36ers defeated the Perth Wildcats 89–84.

In 2015, the arena underwent close to $1 million in upgrades, with new lighting, a new score-cube, and a new public address system. The original score-cube, lighting and PA were in the venue since it opened in 1992.

== Sporting events ==
=== Basketball ===
Since its opening Adelaide Arena has played host to 7 NBL Grand Final games in 1994 (1 game), 1998 (1 game), 1999 (games 2 and 3), 2002 (games 2 and 3) and 2014 (1 game), with the 36ers winning all games except the opening game of the 1994 series against the North Melbourne Giants and Game 2 of the 1999 series against the Victoria Titans.

The Adelaide Arena has also played host to Boomers and Opals games against various visiting nations and other touring teams, including the opening game of a five-game series between the Boomers and Magic Johnson's All-Stars, who included former NBA players such as captain/coach Johnson and three-time NBA All-Star Mark Aguirre who top scored with 32 points, on 7 March 1995. In front of almost 8,000 fans, the All-Stars defeated the Boomers (who included 36ers players Mark Davis, Brett Maher, Mike McKay, Chris Blakemore and Brett Wheeler) 113–98.

The Harlem Globetrotters have also played at the arena, the most recent occasion being on 1 November 2013.

The NBL returned to the Arena when the New Zealand Breakers hosted a game against the Adelaide 36ers at the Venue on 12 March 2022.

=== Netball ===
The arena was the home of major netball games played in South Australia, with the state league grand final being played there until 2000. The Australian Netball Diamonds have used the arena for test matches, and from 1997 until 2001 it was the home of the Adelaide Thunderbirds and Adelaide Ravens who played the Commonwealth Bank Trophy.

== See also ==
- List of indoor arenas in Australia
