= NBL All-Time Coaching Records =

As of the end of the 2025–26 NBL season, there has been 157 NBL Coaches.

Bold type indicates current Head/Interim Coaches.

Note: Coaching records and rankings are updated at the conclusion of each season. However some records may be updated during the season if a coach parts ways with their assigned club.

Source as of 2010

Rank	Previous Rank	Coach	# of Championships	Championship Seasons	Games	Wins	Losses	Win %	Comments
**1**	**1**	**Brian Goorjian**	**7**	1992, 1996, 2002-03, 2003-04, 2004-05, 2008-09, 2025-26	**873**	**598**	**275**	**68.50%**	Head Coach of Sydney Kings
2	2	Lindsay Gaze	**2**	1993, 1997	651	339	312	52.07%	NBL Coach of the Year Award is named after Lindsay Gaze
3	3	Joey Wright	**1**	2006-07	500	284	216	56.80%	
4	4	Brian Kerle	**4**	1979, 1980, 1985, 1987	456	282	174	61.84%	
5	5	Alan Black	**1**	1999-00	497	279	218	56.14%	
6	6	Trevor Gleeson	**5**	2013-14, 2015-16, 2016-17, 2018-19, 2019-20	460	274	186	59.57%	
**7**	**7**	**Dean Vickerman**	**3**	2014-15, 2017-18, 2020-21	**399**	**250**	**149**	**62.66%**	Head Coach of Melbourne United
8	8	Bob Turner	**2**	1983, 1984	369	224	145	60.70%	
9	9	Brendan Joyce	**1**	2000-01	433	217	216	50.12%	
10	10	Andrej Lemanis	**3**	2010-11, 2011-12, 2012-13	408	216	192	52.94%	
11	11	Phil Smyth	**3**	1998, 1998-99, 2001-02	365	205	160	56.16%	
12	12	Barry Barnes	0		347	191	156	55.04%	
13	13	Gordie McLeod	0		438	190	248	43.38%	
14	14	Bruce Palmer	**1**	1989	297	184	113	61.95%	
15	15	Cal Bruton	**1**	1990	330	171	159	51.82%	
16	16	Rob Beveridge	**1**	2009-10	310	164	146	52.90%	
17	17	Brett Brown	**1**	1994	278	149	129	53.60%	
18	18	Adrian Hurley	**1**	1995	247	143	104	57.89%	
19	19	Ian Stacker	0		285	143	142	50.18%	
20	20	Al Westover	**2**	2005-06, 2007-08	208	134	74	64.42%	
21	21	Aaron Fearne	0		264	129	135	48.86%	
22	22	Ken Cole	**1**	1986	210	106	104	50.48%	
23	23	David Claxton	0		230	100	130	43.48%	
24	24	Ken Richardson	**1**	1982	156	98	58	62.82%	
25	25	David Lindstrom	0		184	88	96	47.83%	
**26**	**29**	**Scott Roth**	**1**	2023-24	**166**	**86**	**80**	**51.81%**	Head Coach of Tasmania JackJumpers
27	26	Scott Fisher	0		137	78	59	56.93%	
28	27	Tom Wisman	0		165	77	88	46.67%	
29	28	Brett Flanigan	0		181	77	104	42.54%	
**30**	**36**	**John Rillie**	**0**		**131**	**76**	**55**	**58.02%**	Head Coach of Perth Wildcats
**31**	**30**	**Adam Forde**	**0**		**186**	**76**	**110**	**40.86%**	Head Coach of Cairns Taipans
32	31	Gary Fox	0		108	66	42	61.11%	
33	32	Shawn Dennis	0		170	62	108	36.47%	
34	33	Mike Dunlap	0		95	59	36	62.11%	
35	34	Simon Mitchell	0		121	58	63	47.93%	
36	35	Guy Molloy	0		160	57	103	35.63%	
37	37	Mark Bragg	0		164	54	110	32.93%	
**38**	**48**	**Justin Tatum**	**1**	2024-25	**93**	**51**	**42**	**54.84%**	Head Coach of Illawarra Hawks
39	38	Mike Osborne	0		98	50	48	51.02%	
40	39	Charlie Ammit	0		161	49	112	30.43%	
41	40	Chase Buford	**2**	2021-22, 2022-23	68	47	21	69.12%	
42	41	Shane Heal	0		118	46	72	38.98%	
43	42	Owen Wells	0		88	45	43	51.14%	
44	43	Robbie Cadee	0		125	45	80	36.00%	
45	44	Don Shipway	0		81	43	38	53.09%	
46	45	Andrew Gaze	0		86	42	44	48.84%	
47	89	Mike Wells	0		71	41	30	57.75%	Head Coach of Adelaide 36ers
48	56	Mike Kelly	0		128	41	87	32.03%	
49	82	Josh King	0		63	40	23	63.49%	Head Coach of South East Melbourne Phoenix
50	47	Murray Arnold	**1**	1991	58	39	19	67.24%	
51	49	Bill Tomlinson	0		144	39	105	27.08%	
52	50	Jerry Lee	**1**	1988	57	38	19	66.67%	
53	51	Owen Hughan	0		54	37	17	68.52%	
54	52	Steve Breheny	0		75	37	38	49.33%	
55	53	Andris Blicavs	0		125	37	88	29.60%	
56	54	Dave Ankeney	0		54	36	18	66.67%	
57	55	Mody Maor	0		67	36	31	53.73%	
58	56	Scott Ninnis	0		74	33	41	44.59%	
59	57	David Adkins	0		78	33	45	42.31%	
60	58	Dan Shamir	0		91	32	59	35.16%	
61	59	Dean Demopoulos	0		58	31	27	53.45%	
62	60	Paul Henare	0		59	30	29	50.85%	
63	61	David Ingham	0		61	30	31	49.18%	
64	52	Conner Henry	0		67	30	37	44.78%	
65	53	Ray Tomlinson	0		70	29	41	41.43%	
66	64	Chris Anstey	0		60	28	32	46.67%	
67	65	C.J. Bruton	0		67	27	40	40.30%	
68	66	Paul Woolpert	0		59	26	33	44.07%	
69	67	Justin Schueller	0		57	25	32	43.86%	
70	68	Marty Clarke	0		84	25	59	29.76%	
71	69	Cal Stamp	0		41	24	17	58.54%	
72	70	Will Weaver	0		34	23	11	67.65%	Incoming Head Coach of Brisbane Bullets
73	105	Petteri Koponen	0		62	23	39	37.10%	Resigned as Head Coach of New Zealand Breakers
74	71	Eric Cooks	0		76	23	53	30.26%	
75	72	Rick Harden	0		48	22	26	45.83%	
76	73	Jay Brehmer	0		53	21	32	39.62%	
77	74	Jim Calvin	0		70	21	49	30.00%	
78	75	Mark Wright	0		63	20	43	31.75%	
79	76	Frank Arsego	0		56	19	37	33.93%	
80	77	Richard Orlick	0		68	19	49	27.94%	
81	79	Darryl McDonald	0		52	18	34	34.62%	
82	78	Mark Watkins	0		74	18	56	24.32%	
83	80	Tom Maher	0		54	17	37	31.48%	
84	81	Jim Ericksen	**1**	1981	24	16	8	66.67%	
85	83	Scott Morrison	0		28	16	12	57.14%	
86	84	Tony Gaze	0		46	16	30	34.78%	
87	85	Ian Robilliard	0		49	16	33	32.65%	
88	86	Mike Ellis	0		34	15	19	44.12%	
89	87	Les Riddle	0		26	14	12	53.85%	
90	88	Don Monson	0		28	14	14	50.00%	
91	90	Joe Farrugia	0		40	14	26	35.00%	
92	91	Dean Donnollon	0		22	13	8	59.09%	
93	92	Denis Kibble	0		25	13	12	52.00%	
94	93	Mahmoud Abdelfattah	0		29	13	16	44.83%	
95	94	Claude Williams	0		35	13	22	37.14%	
96	95	James Duncan	0		37	13	24	35.14%	
97	96	Patrick Hunt	0		22	12	10	54.55%	
98	97	Kevin Braswell	0		28	12	16	42.86%	
99	98	Damian Cotter	0		40	12	28	30.00%	
100	99	Tom Pottenger	0		26	11	15	42.31%	
101	100	Stephen Johansen	0		35	11	24	31.43%	
102	101	Casey Jones	0		15	10	5	66.67%	
103	102	Robert Young	0		18	10	8	55.56%	
104	103	Ted Weston	0		26	10	16	38.46%	
105	104	Henry Daigle	0		26	10	16	38.46%	
106	106	Colin Cadee	0		31	10	21	32.26%	
107	107	Mel Dalgleish	0		26	9	17	34.62%	
108	108	Ian Ellis	0		26	8	18	30.77%	
109	109	Rex Johnstone	0		17	7	10	41.18%	
110	110	Steve Fairnham	0		22	7	15	31.82%	
111	111	Paul Coughter	0		16	6	10	37.50%	
112	112	Gordon Ellis	0		21	6	16	28.57%	
113	113	Alan Hughes	0		22	6	16	27.27%	
114	114	Jacob Jackomas	0		29	6	32	15.79%	
115	115	Shaun O'Connell	0		40	6	34	15.00%	
116	NEW	Stu Lash	0		18	5	13	27.78%	
117	116	Curtis Coleman	0		26	5	21	19.23%	
118	117	Matt Flinn	0		28	5	23	17.86%	
119	118	Albert Leslie	0		10	4	6	40.00%	
120	119	Mark Beecroft	0		11	4	7	36.36%	
121	120	Andy Campbell	0		11	4	7	36.36%	
122	121	Lloyd Klaman	0		15	4	11	26.67%	
123	122	Greg Vanderjagt	0		15	4	11	26.67%	
124	123	Danny Adamson	0		23	4	19	17.39%	
125	124	Mark Leader	0		23	4	19	17.39%	
126	125	Phil Thomas	0		27	4	23	14.81%	
127	126	Sam MacKinnon	0		7	3	4	42.86%	
128	127	Reg Biddings	0		14	3	11	21.43%	
129	128	Joe Connelly	0		16	3	13	18.75%	
130	129	Alan Dawe	0		18	3	15	16.67%	
131	130	Lynn Massey	0		23	3	20	13.04%	
132	131	Dean Templeton	0		26	3	23	11.54%	
133	132	Tim Kaiser	0		4	2	2	50.00%	
134	133	Jeff Green	0		9	2	7	22.22%	
135	134	Keith Scott	0		22	2	20	9.09%	
136	135	Rod Popp	0		28	2	26	7.14%	
137	136	Peter Ali	0		1	1	0	100.00%	
138	137	David Hancock	0		1	1	0	100.00%	
139	138	Andy Stewart	0		1	1	0	100.00%	
140	139	Kevin Lisch	0		1	1	0	100.00%	
141	140	Kerry Williams	0		1	1	0	100.00%	
142	141	Dave Nelson	0		2	1	1	50.00%	
143	142	Glen Bines	0		2	1	1	50.00%	
144	NEW	Rhys Carter	0		2	1	1	50.00%	
145	143	Judd Flavell	0		3	1	2	33.33%	
146	144	Brian Lester	0		5	1	4	20.00%	
147	145	Terry Kealey	0		6	1	5	16.67%	
148	146	Tony Cox	0		13	1	12	7.69%	
149	147	David Simmons	0		22	1	21	4.55%	
150	148	Tim Mallon	0		1	0	1	0.00%	
151	149	Tim Hudson	0		1	0	1	0.00%	
152	150	Paul Mellett	0		2	0	2	0.00%	
153	151	John Wright	0		2	0	2	0.00%	
154	152	Jamie Pearlman	0		2	0	2	0.00%	
155	153	John Gardiner	0		4	0	4	0.00%	
156	154	Mark Price	0		5	0	5	0.00%	
157	155	Pete Mathieson	0		24	0	24	0.00%	
