= Paul Rogers (basketball) =

Australian retired basketball player (born 1973)

- Rogers with the Warwick Senators in 2026

Warwick Senators
- Title: Assistant coach
- League: NBL1 West

Personal information
- Born: 29 September 1973 (age 53) Adelaide, South Australia, Australia
- Listed height: 213 cm (7 ft 0 in)
- Listed weight: 118 kg (260 lb)

Career information
- College: North Idaho (1993–1994); Gonzaga (1994–1997)
- NBA draft: 1997: 2nd round, 53rd overall pick
- Drafted by: Los Angeles Lakers
- Playing career: 1992–2010
- Position: Centre
- Coaching career: 2024–present

Career history

Playing
- 1992–1994: Adelaide Buffalos
- 1992–1993: Adelaide 36ers
- 1997–1998: Real Madrid
- 1998–2002: Perth Wildcats
- 2002–2003: Adelaide 36ers
- 2003–2005: Casademont Girona
- 2005–2010: Perth Wildcats
- 2006: Willetton Tigers
- 2010: East Perth Eagles

Coaching
- 2024–present: Warwick Senators (assistant)

Career highlights
- As player: 2× NBL champion (2000, 2010); NBL Most Valuable Player (2000); 2× All-NBL First Team (2000, 2002); 3× All-NBL Second Team (1999, 2001, 2007); All-NBL Third Team (2008); SBL All-Star Five (2006); First-team All-WCC (1996); As coach: NBL1 West champion (2026)
- Stats at Basketball Reference
Medals
Men's basketball
Representing Australia
Gold medal – first place	2006 Melbourne	Team competition

Paul Andrew Rogers (born 29 September 1973) is an Australian basketball coach and former player. After playing college basketball in the United States for Gonzaga, he was drafted in the 1997 NBA draft by the Los Angeles Lakers but never played an NBA game. He played 12 seasons in the Australian National Basketball League (NBL). In 2000, he was named NBL Most Valuable Player and helped the Perth Wildcats win the NBL championship. He won his second NBL championship, also with the Wildcats, in 2010.

== Early life ==
Rogers was born in Adelaide, South Australia.

== Basketball career ==
Rogers debuted in the National Basketball League (NBL) for the Adelaide 36ers in 1992. He played 10 games over two seasons with the 36ers. Between 1992 and 1994, he also played in the Continental Basketball Association (CBA) for the Adelaide Buffalos.

In 1993, Rogers moved to the United States to play college basketball for North Idaho College. In 1994, he transferred to Gonzaga. He was a first-team All-West Coast Conference selection as a junior in 1995–96 and a leading pre-season candidate for WCC Player of the Year in 1996–97 before breaking his foot early in the season. He was drafted in the 1997 NBA draft by the Los Angeles Lakers. He never played for the Lakers, with the team renouncing his rights in January 1999.

For the 1997–98 season, Rogers played in Spain for Real Madrid.

Rogers returned to Australia for the 1998–99 NBL season, joining the Perth Wildcats. In February 1999, he signed with the Toronto Raptors. He did not make his NBA debut due to a broken leg and fractured right ankle. He returned to Perth for the 1999–2000 NBL season, going on to be named league MVP and helping the Wildcats win the NBL championship. After four seasons, he returned to the Adelaide 36ers on a five-year contract in 2002.

Rogers returned to Spain in 2003, playing the next two seasons for Casademont Girona.

Rogers returned to the Perth Wildcats in 2005. He was named captain of the Wildcats for the 2006–07 NBL season. Rogers was restricted to two matches in the 2008–09 NBL season due to a knee injury and a ruptured disc in his back that required surgery. In October 2009, he suffered a torn triceps and then an infected elbow, which ruled him out for the rest of the 2009–10 NBL season. In March 2010, he retired from the NBL after the Wildcats won the championship. He had stints in the State Basketball League (SBL) with the Willetton Tigers (2006) and East Perth Eagles (2010).

Rogers was named in the Perth Wildcats 30th and 40th Anniversary teams.

In July 2023, Rogers was inducted into the Basketball WA Hall of Fame.

=== National team ===
Rogers represented Australia at the 1998 FIBA World Championship in Athens, the 2000 Summer Olympic Games in Sydney, and again at the 2004 Olympics in Athens.

== Coaching career ==
Rogers joined the Warwick Senators women's team as an assistant coach for the 2024 NBL1 West season. He returned as Senators women's assistant in 2025 and again in 2026. The Senators reached their second straight NBL1 West Grand Final in 2026, where they defeated the Cockburn Cougars 102–76 to win the championship. The team's head coach, Brad Robbins, missed the grand final due to his Australian Emus international duties; Rogers subsequently took over as acting head coach for the game.

== Personal life ==
Rogers has dual Australian-British nationality.

Rogers and his wife Rennae have four children. Up until 2022, he and his family lived in Denmark, Western Australia.

As of July 2024, Rogers was teaching at John Septimus Roe Anglican Community School in Perth.
