= NBL Coach of the Year Award =

The National Basketball League Coach of the Year is an annual National Basketball League (NBL) award given since the 1980 NBL season to the best head coach of the regular season. As of the 2023–24 season, the head coach, assistant coach and captain of each team vote for the Coach of the Year. Voters are not allowed to vote for the coach of their own team. The winner receives the Lindsay Gaze Trophy, which is named in honour of legendary NBL coach and Basketball Hall of Famer Lindsay Gaze.

In 2015–16, Townsville Crocodiles head coach Shawn Dennis became the first coach in NBL history to be named Coach of the Year with the combination of a losing record and without qualifying for the Finals. Adrian Hurley (2005) is the only other recipient with a losing record – honoured after leading the Hunter Pirates to the Finals with a 15–17 record – while Robbie Cadee (1983) is the only other recipient to have missed the Finals – honoured after leading the Bankstown Bruins to a seventh-placed finish with a 12–10 record.

== Winners ==
Year	Player	Nationality	Team
1980	Barry Barnes	Australia	Nunawading Spectres
1981	Bob Turner	Australia	Newcastle Falcons
1982	Cal Bruton	United States	Geelong Cats
1983	Robbie Cadee	Australia	Bankstown Bruins
1984	Brian Kerle	Australia	Brisbane Bullets
1985	Bob Turner (2)	Australia	Canberra Cannons
1986	Ken Cole	Australia	Adelaide 36ers
1987	David Lindstrom	Australia	Illawarra Hawks
1988	Bruce Palmer	United States	North Melbourne Giants
1989	Lindsay Gaze	Australia	Melbourne Tigers
1990	Brian Kerle (2)	Australia	Brisbane Bullets
1991	Murray Arnold	Australia	Perth Wildcats
1992	Brian Goorjian	United States	South East Melbourne Magic
1993	Alan Black	Australia	Illawarra Hawks
1994	Brett Brown	United States	North Melbourne Giants
1995	Alan Black (2); Thomas Wisman	Australia; Australia	Illawarra Hawks; Newcastle Falcons
1996	Brett Flanigan	Australia	Canberra Cannons
1997	Lindsay Gaze (2); Brian Goorjian (2)	Australia; United States	Melbourne Tigers; South East Melbourne Magic
1998	Brian Goorjian (3)	United States	South East Melbourne Magic
1998–99	Lindsay Gaze (3); Brendan Joyce	Australia; Australia	Melbourne Tigers; Wollongong Hawks
1999–2000	Ian Stacker	Australia	Townsville Crocodiles
2000–01	Brendan Joyce (2)	Australia	Wollongong Hawks
2001–02	Brian Goorjian (4)	United States	Victoria Titans
2002–03	Ian Stacker (2)	Australia	Townsville Crocodiles
2003–04	Joey Wright	United States	Brisbane Bullets
2004–05	Adrian Hurley	Australia	Hunter Pirates
2005–06	Al Westover	United States	Melbourne Tigers
2006–07	Joey Wright (2)	United States	Brisbane Bullets
2007–08	Brian Goorjian (5)	United States	Sydney Kings
2008–09	Brian Goorjian (6)	United States	South Dragons
2009–10	Gordie McLeod	Australia	Wollongong Hawks
2010–11	Trevor Gleeson	Australia	Townsville Crocodiles
2011–12	Andrej Lemanis	Australia	New Zealand Breakers
2012–13	Andrej Lemanis (2)	Australia	New Zealand Breakers
2013–14	Gordie McLeod (2)	Australia	Wollongong Hawks
2014–15	Aaron Fearne	Australia	Cairns Taipans
2015–16	Shawn Dennis	Australia	Townsville Crocodiles
2016–17	Joey Wright (3)	United States	Adelaide 36ers
2017–18	Dean Vickerman	Australia	Melbourne United
2018–19	Dean Vickerman (2)	Australia	Melbourne United
2019–20	Mike Kelly	United States	Cairns Taipans
2020–21	Trevor Gleeson (2)	Australia	Perth Wildcats
2021–22	Scott Roth	United States	Tasmania JackJumpers
2022–23	Adam Forde	Australia	Cairns Taipans
2023–24	Dean Vickerman (3)	Australia	Melbourne United
2024–25	Justin Tatum	United States	Illawarra Hawks
2025–26	Brian Goorjian (7)	United States	Sydney Kings
