= Sydney Model Railway Exhibition =

- Date: October long weekend
- Venue: Sydney Olympic Park
- Coordinates: 33°55′32″S 150°54′53″E
- Inaugurated: 1962

The Sydney Model Railway Exhibition is an annual railway modelling exhibition, which is held on the Labour Day long weekend in October in Sydney. It is organised by the New South Wales Branch of the Australian Model Railway Association (AMRA).

The Exhibition was first held in 1962 in Burwood, and since then, the Exhibition has been held annually: first at Burwood at the Police-Citizens Boys Club, and then at the Lower Sydney Town Hall. In 1977 the Exhibition moved to the Ford and Mazda pavilions at the Sydney Showground (Moore Park), before moving to the Whitlam Centre in Liverpool in 1984. The Exhibition was held at the Hurstville Leisure and Aquatic Centre in 2005, when the Whitlam Centre at Liverpool was being renovated. The 2019 Exhibition is to be held, for the first time, at the Southee Pavilion at Sydney Olympic Park.

It includes various layouts and commercial stands of the following gauges:

- G scale
- O scale
- On30 scale
- 00 scale
- HO Scale
- HOn3 1/2 scale
- HOn 2 1/2 scaleAustr
- N scale
- Z scale

The programme sponsors a vote of favourite layout, for which the winner receives a prize (usually, but not always, a train set). In the past, "The Train Shed" has operated a ride-on Thomas the Tank Engine for children at the show. Ride-on train rides are now operated by the North-West Model Engineers. There is also a "U-Drive" display that allows visitors to operate working scale models of Thomas the Tank Engine and Australian prototype trains.

In 2005, the Association moved the exhibition to the Hurstville leisure centre for 2005 and 2006 before returning to the Whitlam Centre from 2007 onwards. This model railway exhibition is one of the oldest and largest model railway exhibitions in Australia. In 2012 the Australian Model Railway Association celebrated the 50th anniversary of the Sydney Model Railway Exhibition.

In September 2023, the AMRA NSW Branch announced on Facebook that the 2019 exhibition ran at a loss, and COVID had prevented exhibitions in 2020 - 2022. AMRA NSW stated that it "is not currently in the position to host the Sydney Model Railway Exhibition, not in 2023, not in 2024, and not for the foreseeable future."
