= NBL Good Hands Award =

The National Basketball League Good Hands honour was awarded annually to a player in the National Basketball League (NBL) between 1990 and 1999. The award was determined by adding assists and steals and subtracting the player's turnover count. After 1999, the award was discontinued.

== Winners ==
Year	Player	Nationality	Team	Ref
1990	Shane Heal	Australia	Geelong Supercats	
1991	Andre LaFleur	United States	Gold Coast Cougars	
1992	Andre LaFleur	United States	Gold Coast Rollers	
1993	Andre LaFleur	United States	Gold Coast Rollers	
1994	Darryl McDonald	United States	North Melbourne Giants	
1995	Darryl McDonald	United States	North Melbourne Giants	
1996	Darryl McDonald	United States	North Melbourne Giants	
1997	Darryl McDonald	United States	North Melbourne Giants	
1998	Derek Rucker	United States	Townsville Suns	
1998–99	Derek Rucker	United States	West Sydney Razorbacks	
