= Liberty Central School District =

School district in the U.S. state of New York

Location
- Liberty, New York, 12754; United States

District information
- Type: Public
- Grades: PreK-12
- Established: 1925; 100 years ago
- Superintendent: Dr. Patrick Sullivan

Students and staff
- District mascot: Redhawks
- Colors: Red and white

Other information
- Website: www.libertyk12.org

The Liberty Central School District is located in Sullivan County, New York. The school consists of a High School and a Middle School, which are part of the same complex but are administered as two separate schools, and an elementary school which is a separate building less than a mile away from the High School and Middle School.

== General information ==
The Liberty Elementary School was built in 1925 as a centralized location for education in the Liberty Area. Overcrowding was a major problem, as too many students were going there (there were at one point tents on the front lawn to accommodate classes). Overcrowding is still a problem after the district's pre-kindergarten and kindergarten school closed, so now the grades taught go from pre-kindergarten to 4th.

In 1963, the current High School was built to accommodate the influx of students, and the upper-level students were moved there from the original school, while those in lower grades remained. There are approximately 600 students attending it from 9th to 12th grade making it Class B for sports. In addition to normal courses Liberty High School offers advanced placement and distance learning classes.

Due to more crowding, the Liberty Middle School was built through efforts by then Superintendent Richard Beruk and opened in 1991 to hold students from grades 5 to 8.

Beginning in 2009 major renovations began to all three schools in the district. Some renovations include a new media center and science labs in the high school as well as a complete overhaul to the entire elementary school. The middle school also received a new roof during these renovations.

Continuing these renovations, on May 19, 2015, a scaled-down version of the second phase of these renovations were approved after the full renovations were rejected on October 21, 2014.

== Team sports hosted at Liberty Central ==
The Liberty Central school districts hosts various team sports which compete against other schools in the area and is a member district of the NYSPHAA, part of Section 9 in the association's eleven geographical areas.

Each season of the school year hosts different sports, these team seasons are fall, winter and spring sports.

There are three groupings of sports based on the ages of the players. Modified, which will be referred to as "Mod." Junior Varsity, referred to as "JV". Varsity, referred to as "V".

Modified is grades seven and eight, junior varsity is grades nine(freshman) and ten(sophomore), and Varsity is grades eleven(Junior) and twelve(senior).

Certain sports are only accessible to girls or boys, this will be depicted by: B for just boys, G for just girls, and B/G for boys and girls.

=== Fall sports ===
- Soccer Mod., JV, V—B/G
- Football Mod., JV, V—B
- Tennis JV, V—G (Boys play in the Spring)
- Cross Country—Mod., V—B/G (Cross Country includes all grades in those two groupings)
- Volleyball—Mod., JV—G (Includes all grades in the two groupings)
- Cheerleading—All grades --

=== Winter sports ===
- Basketball Mod., JV, V—B/G
- Alpine Skiing V (Lower grades can prove worthy to do this sport through various tests) -- B/G
- Indoor Track(and field) -- All grades—B/G
- Cheerleading—All grades --
- Wrestling Mod., V (All grades are included in these groupings) -- B

=== Spring sports ===
- Baseball—Mod., JV, V—B
- Softball—Mod., JV, V—G
- Track and Field—Mod, V—B/G (All grades are included in this grouping.)
- Tennis—V (All grades included) -- B (Girls play in the Fall)
- Various events grouped under Track and Field

== School campuses ==
Liberty High School 125 Buckley St. Liberty, NY 12754

Liberty Middle School 145 Buckley St. Liberty, NY 12754

Liberty Elementary School 201 North Main St. Liberty, NY 12754
