= 1982 NBL season =

- League: National Basketball League
- Sport: Basketball
- Duration: 6 February – 11 July 1982 (Regular season); 16–18 July 1982 (Finals)
- Games: 26
- Teams: 14
- TV partner: ABC

Regular season
- Season champions: West Adelaide Bearcats
- Season MVP: Al Green (West Adelaide)
- Top scorer: Reg Biddings (Adelaide)

Finals
- Champions: West Adelaide Bearcats (1st title)
- Runners-up: Geelong Cats

NBL seasons
- ← 1981 1983 →

The 1982 NBL season was the fourth season of the National Basketball League (NBL).

== Regular season ==
The 1982 regular season took place over 22 rounds between 6 February 1982 and 11 July 1982. Each team played 26 games, against every opponent twice.

=== Round 1 ===
Date	Home	Score	Away	Venue	Crowd	Box Score
6/02/1982	Canberra Cannons	93–82	St. Kilda Saints	AIS Arena	N/A	boxscore
6/02/1982	Bankstown Bruins	95–105	Newcastle Falcons	Bankstown Basketball Stadium	N/A	boxscore
6/02/1982	Westate Wildcats	74–105	Geelong Cats	Perry Lakes Basketball Stadium	N/A	boxscore
6/02/1982	Illawarra Hawks	98–91	Launceston Casino City	Beaton Park Stadium	N/A	boxscore
6/02/1982	Adelaide City Eagles	84–87	Coburg Giants	Apollo Entertainment Centre	N/A	boxscore
7/02/1982	Sydney SuperSonics	77–78	St. Kilda Saints	Alexandria Stadium	N/A	boxscore
7/02/1982	West Adelaide Bearcats	68–62	Coburg Giants	Apollo Entertainment Centre	N/A	boxscore
7/02/1982	Brisbane Bullets	104–91	Launceston Casino City	Auchenflower Stadium	N/A	boxscore

=== Round 2 ===
Date	Home	Score	Away	Venue	Crowd	Box Score
13/02/1982	Canberra Cannons	95–88	Westate Wildcats	AIS Arena	N/A	boxscore
13/02/1982	Geelong Cats	88–101	Coburg Giants	Corio Leisure Centre	N/A	boxscore
13/02/1982	Bankstown Bruins	78–82	Sydney SuperSonics	Bankstown Basketball Stadium	N/A	boxscore
13/02/1982	Illawarra Hawks	87–88	Adelaide City Eagles	Beaton Park Stadium	N/A	boxscore
13/02/1982	St. Kilda Saints	79–92	West Adelaide Bearcats	Albert Park Basketball Stadium	N/A	boxscore
13/02/1982	Bankstown Bruins	66–94	Nunawading Spectres	Bankstown Basketball Stadium	N/A	boxscore
14/02/1982	Nunawading Spectres	92–90	West Adelaide Bearcats	Burwood Stadium	N/A	boxscore
14/02/1982	Sydney SuperSonics	101–88	Westate Wildcats	Alexandria Stadium	N/A	boxscore
14/02/1982	Brisbane Bullets	79–74	Adelaide City Eagles	Auchenflower Stadium	N/A	boxscore
14/02/1982	Launceston Casino City	95–112	Coburg Giants	Dowling Street Stadium	N/A	boxscore

=== Round 3 ===
Date	Home	Score	Away	Venue	Crowd	Box Score
18/02/1982	Sydney SuperSonics	91–76	Launceston Casino City	Alexandria Stadium	N/A	boxscore
19/02/1982	Westate Wildcats	83–69	Canberra Cannons	Perry Lakes Basketball Stadium	N/A	boxscore
20/02/1982	West Adelaide Bearcats	114–77	St. Kilda Saints	Apollo Entertainment Centre	N/A	boxscore
20/02/1982	Illawarra Hawks	91–99	Brisbane Bullets	Beaton Park Stadium	N/A	boxscore
20/02/1982	Launceston Casino City	99–101	Newcastle Falcons	Devonport Stadium	N/A	boxscore
21/02/1982	Coburg Giants	60–57	Canberra Cannons	Ken Watson Stadium	N/A	boxscore
21/02/1982	Geelong Cats	94–91	Newcastle Falcons	Corio Leisure Centre	N/A	boxscore
21/02/1982	Adelaide City Eagles	79–86	St. Kilda Saints	Apollo Entertainment Centre	N/A	boxscore

=== Round 4 ===
Date	Home	Score	Away	Venue	Crowd	Box Score
26/02/1982	Westate Wildcats	92–82	Bankstown Bruins	Perry Lakes Basketball Stadium	N/A	boxscore
27/02/1982	Nunawading Spectres	81–62	Canberra Cannons	Burwood Stadium	N/A	boxscore
27/02/1982	Illawarra Hawks	94–83	Sydney SuperSonics	Beaton Park Stadium	N/A	boxscore
27/02/1982	Launceston Casino City	81–92	Brisbane Bullets	Bankstown Basketball Stadium	N/A	boxscore
27/02/1982	Adelaide City Eagles	103–101	Newcastle Falcons	Apollo Entertainment Centre	N/A	boxscore
28/02/1982	Coburg Giants	98–74	Bankstown Bruins	Ken Watson Stadium	N/A	boxscore
28/02/1982	Geelong Cats	88–98	Brisbane Bullets	Corio Leisure Centre	N/A	boxscore
28/02/1982	West Adelaide Bearcats	115–100	Newcastle Falcons	Apollo Entertainment Centre	N/A	boxscore
28/02/1982	St. Kilda Saints	70–67	Canberra Cannons	Albert Park Basketball Stadium	N/A	boxscore

=== Round 5 ===
Date	Home	Score	Away	Venue	Crowd	Box Score
5/03/1982	Canberra Cannons	106–83	Sydney SuperSonics	AIS Arena	N/A	boxscore
6/03/1982	Newcastle Falcons	77–65	Canberra Cannons	Newcastle Sports Entertainment Centre	N/A	boxscore
6/03/1982	Nunawading Spectres	96–72	Geelong Cats	Burwood Stadium	N/A	boxscore
6/03/1982	Westate Wildcats	87–82	Coburg Giants	Perry Lakes Basketball Stadium	N/A	boxscore
6/03/1982	Launceston Casino City	86–91	St. Kilda Saints	Dowling Street Stadium	N/A	boxscore
6/03/1982	Adelaide City Eagles	83–74	West Adelaide Bearcats	Apollo Entertainment Centre	N/A	boxscore
7/03/1982	Sydney SuperSonics	90–74	Bankstown Bruins	Alexandria Stadium	N/A	boxscore
7/03/1982	St. Kilda Saints	79–81	Nunawading Spectres	Albert Park Basketball Stadium	N/A	boxscore
7/03/1982	Brisbane Bullets	91–84	Illawarra Hawks	Auchenflower Stadium	N/A	boxscore
7/03/1982	Geelong Cats	82–75	Launceston Casino City	Corio Leisure Centre	N/A	boxscore

=== Round 6 ===
Date	Home	Score	Away	Venue	Crowd	Box Score
13/03/1982	Illawarra Hawks	94–103	West Adelaide Bearcats	Beaton Park Stadium	N/A	boxscore
13/03/1982	Westate Wildcats	62–68	St. Kilda Saints	Perry Lakes Basketball Stadium	N/A	boxscore
13/03/1982	Newcastle Falcons	77–75	Nunawading Spectres	Newcastle Sports Entertainment Centre	N/A	boxscore
14/03/1982	Brisbane Bullets	89–97	West Adelaide Bearcats	Auchenflower Stadium	N/A	boxscore

=== Round 7 ===
Date	Home	Score	Away	Venue	Crowd	Box Score
20/03/1982	Bankstown Bruins	76–92	Adelaide City Eagles	Bankstown Basketball Stadium	N/A	boxscore
20/03/1982	Canberra Cannons	87–98	West Adelaide Bearcats	AIS Arena	N/A	boxscore
20/03/1982	Westate Wildcats	82–94	Nunawading Spectres	Perry Lakes Basketball Stadium	N/A	boxscore
20/03/1982	Illawarra Hawks	73–82	St. Kilda Saints	Beaton Park Stadium	N/A	boxscore
21/03/1982	Newcastle Falcons	99–105	Adelaide City Eagles	Newcastle Sports Entertainment Centre	N/A	boxscore
21/03/1982	Sydney SuperSonics	76–78	West Adelaide Bearcats	Alexandria Stadium	N/A	boxscore
21/03/1982	Brisbane Bullets	66–83	St. Kilda Saints	Auchenflower Stadium	N/A	boxscore
21/03/1982	Launceston Casino City	91–101	Geelong Cats	Dowling Street Stadium	N/A	boxscore

=== Round 8 ===
Date	Home	Score	Away	Venue	Crowd	Box Score
26/03/1982	Westate Wildcats	93–86	Newcastle Falcons	Perry Lakes Basketball Stadium	N/A	boxscore
26/03/1982	West Adelaide Bearcats	109–89	Brisbane Bullets	Apollo Entertainment Centre	N/A	boxscore
26/03/1982	Launceston Casino City	81–80	Bankstown Bruins	Dowling Street Stadium	N/A	boxscore
28/03/1982	Adelaide City Eagles	76–82	Brisbane Bullets	Apollo Entertainment Centre	N/A	boxscore
28/03/1982	Geelong Cats	90–65	Bankstown Bruins	Corio Leisure Centre	N/A	boxscore
28/03/1982	Coburg Giants	81–92	Newcastle Falcons	Ken Watson Stadium	N/A	boxscore
28/03/1982	Nunawading Spectres	85–77	St. Kilda Saints	Burwood Stadium	N/A	boxscore

=== Round 9 ===
Date	Home	Score	Away	Venue	Crowd	Box Score
2/04/1982	Launceston Casino City	84–92	Westate Wildcats	Dowling Street Stadium	N/A	boxscore
3/04/1982	Adelaide City Eagles	121–103	Westate Wildcats	Apollo Entertainment Centre	N/A	boxscore
3/04/1982	Nunawading Spectres	76–65	Brisbane Bullets	Burwood Stadium	N/A	boxscore
3/04/1982	Geelong Cats	96–85	Illawarra Hawks	Corio Leisure Centre	N/A	boxscore
3/04/1982	Sydney SuperSonics	78–72	Canberra Cannons	Alexandria Stadium	N/A	boxscore
3/04/1982	Newcastle Falcons	97–88	Coburg Giants	Newcastle Sports Entertainment Centre	N/A	boxscore
3/04/1982	St. Kilda Saints	83–73	Brisbane Bullets	Albert Park Basketball Stadium	N/A	boxscore
4/04/1982	West Adelaide Bearcats	129–100	Westate Wildcats	Apollo Entertainment Centre	N/A	boxscore
4/04/1982	Launceston Casino City	82–90	Illawarra Hawks	Dowling Street Stadium	N/A	boxscore
4/04/1982	Bankstown Bruins	68–81	Coburg Giants	Bankstown Basketball Stadium	N/A	boxscore

=== Round 10 ===
Date	Home	Score	Away	Venue	Crowd	Box Score
17/04/1982	Coburg Giants	87–73	St. Kilda Saints	Albert Park Basketball Stadium	N/A	boxscore
17/04/1982	Illawarra Hawks	104–90	Newcastle Falcons	Beaton Park Stadium	N/A	boxscore
17/04/1982	Canberra Cannons	112–79	Launceston Casino City	AIS Arena	N/A	boxscore
18/04/1982	Bankstown Bruins	76–82	Canberra Cannons	Bankstown Basketball Stadium	N/A	boxscore

=== Round 11 ===
Date	Home	Score	Away	Venue	Crowd	Box Score
23/04/1982	Canberra Cannons	78–91	Nunawading Spectres	AIS Arena	N/A	boxscore
24/04/1982	Sydney SuperSonics	74–81	Nunawading Spectres	Alexandria Stadium	N/A	boxscore
24/04/1982	Illawarra Hawks	125–103	Westate Wildcats	Beaton Park Stadium	N/A	boxscore
24/04/1982	Newcastle Falcons	85–77	St. Kilda Saints	Newcastle Sports Entertainment Centre	N/A	boxscore
24/04/1982	West Adelaide Bearcats	96–70	Launceston Casino City	Apollo Entertainment Centre	N/A	boxscore
25/04/1982	Brisbane Bullets	79–86	Westate Wildcats	Auchenflower Stadium	N/A	boxscore
25/04/1982	Bankstown Bruins	66–67	St. Kilda Saints	Bankstown Basketball Stadium	N/A	boxscore
25/04/1982	Adelaide City Eagles	110–83	Launceston Casino City	Apollo Entertainment Centre	N/A	boxscore

=== Round 12 ===
Date	Home	Score	Away	Venue	Crowd	Box Score
1/05/1982	Canberra Cannons	85–90	Coburg Giants	AIS Arena	N/A	boxscore
1/05/1982	Newcastle Falcons	93–73	Launceston Casino City	Newcastle Sports Entertainment Centre	N/A	boxscore
1/05/1982	Illawarra Hawks	106–83	Nunawading Spectres	Beaton Park Stadium	N/A	boxscore
1/05/1982	Geelong Cats	94–75	Westate Wildcats	Corio Leisure Centre	N/A	boxscore
2/05/1982	Bankstown Bruins	88–84	Launceston Casino City	Bankstown Basketball Stadium	N/A	boxscore
2/05/1982	Sydney SuperSonics	73–102	Coburg Giants	Alexandria Stadium	N/A	boxscore
2/05/1982	West Adelaide Bearcats	96–94	Adelaide City Eagles	Apollo Entertainment Centre	N/A	boxscore
2/05/1982	Brisbane Bullets	74–73	Nunawading Spectres	Auchenflower Stadium	N/A	boxscore

=== Round 13 ===
Date	Home	Score	Away	Venue	Crowd	Box Score
8/05/1982	St. Kilda Saints	75–61	Sydney SuperSonics	Albert Park Basketball Stadium	N/A	boxscore
8/05/1982	Coburg Giants	77–90	West Adelaide Bearcats	Ken Watson Stadium	N/A	boxscore
8/05/1982	Adelaide City Eagles	86–84	Bankstown Bruins	Apollo Entertainment Centre	N/A	boxscore
8/05/1982	Illawarra Hawks	103–105	Geelong Cats	Beaton Park Stadium	N/A	boxscore
8/05/1982	Canberra Cannons	92–109	Newcastle Falcons	AIS Arena	N/A	boxscore
9/05/1982	Nunawading Spectres	78–60	Sydney SuperSonics	Burwood Stadium	N/A	boxscore
9/05/1982	West Adelaide Bearcats	118–82	Bankstown Bruins	Apollo Entertainment Centre	N/A	boxscore
9/05/1982	Brisbane Bullets	72–74	Geelong Cats	Auchenflower Stadium	N/A	boxscore

=== Round 14 ===
Date	Home	Score	Away	Venue	Crowd	Box Score
14/05/1982	Bankstown Bruins	77–94	Westate Wildcats	Bankstown Basketball Stadium	N/A	boxscore
15/05/1982	Newcastle Falcons	100–85	Westate Wildcats	Newcastle Sports Entertainment Centre	N/A	boxscore
15/05/1982	Illawarra Hawks	98–93	Coburg Giants	Beaton Park Stadium	N/A	boxscore
15/05/1982	Launceston Casino City	110–91	Canberra Cannons	Dowling Street Stadium	N/A	boxscore
15/05/1982	West Adelaide Bearcats	84–85	Nunawading Spectres	Apollo Entertainment Centre	N/A	boxscore
16/05/1982	Sydney SuperSonics	73–84	Newcastle Falcons	Alexandria Stadium	N/A	boxscore
16/05/1982	Brisbane Bullets	76–82	Coburg Giants	Auchenflower Stadium	N/A	boxscore
16/05/1982	Geelong Cats	93–64	Canberra Cannons	Corio Leisure Centre	N/A	boxscore
16/05/1982	Adelaide City Eagles	104–79	Nunawading Spectres	Apollo Entertainment Centre	N/A	boxscore
19/05/1982	Coburg Giants	78–77	Nunawading Spectres	Albert Park Basketball Stadium	N/A	boxscore
19/05/1982	St. Kilda Saints	73–74	Geelong Cats	Albert Park Basketball Stadium	N/A	boxscore

=== Round 15 ===
Date	Home	Score	Away	Venue	Crowd	Box Score
21/05/1982	Westate Wildcats	86–75	Brisbane Bullets	Perry Lakes Basketball Stadium	N/A	boxscore
22/05/1982	Nunawading Spectres	95–82	Launceston Casino City	Burwood Stadium	N/A	boxscore
22/05/1982	West Adelaide Bearcats	101–83	Sydney SuperSonics	Apollo Entertainment Centre	N/A	boxscore
22/05/1982	Newcastle Falcons	83–86	Geelong Cats	Newcastle Sports Entertainment Centre	N/A	boxscore
22/05/1982	Canberra Cannons	91–89	Illawarra Hawks	AIS Arena	N/A	boxscore
23/05/1982	Coburg Giants	66–58	Brisbane Bullets	Albert Park Basketball Stadium	N/A	boxscore
23/05/1982	St. Kilda Saints	101–90	Launceston Casino City	Albert Park Basketball Stadium	N/A	boxscore
23/05/1982	Adelaide City Eagles	96–71	Sydney SuperSonics	Apollo Entertainment Centre	N/A	boxscore
23/05/1982	Bankstown Bruins	84–99	Geelong Cats	Bankstown Basketball Stadium	N/A	boxscore
25/05/1982	Westate Wildcats	104–97	Illawarra Hawks	Perry Lakes Basketball Stadium	N/A	boxscore

=== Round 16 ===
Date	Home	Score	Away	Venue	Crowd	Box Score
28/05/1982	St. Kilda Saints	96–85	Westate Wildcats	Albert Park Basketball Stadium	N/A	boxscore
29/05/1982	Nunawading Spectres	101–54	Westate Wildcats	Burwood Stadium	N/A	boxscore
29/05/1982	Illawarra Hawks	94–80	Bankstown Bruins	Beaton Park Stadium	N/A	boxscore
29/05/1982	Canberra Cannons	87–88	Adelaide City Eagles	AIS Arena	N/A	boxscore
29/05/1982	Geelong Cats	74–73	West Adelaide Bearcats	Corio Leisure Centre	N/A	boxscore
30/05/1982	Coburg Giants	110–90	Westate Wildcats	Ken Watson Stadium	N/A	boxscore
30/05/1982	Brisbane Bullets	81–63	Bankstown Bruins	Auchenflower Stadium	N/A	boxscore
30/05/1982	Sydney SuperSonics	85–83	Adelaide City Eagles	Alexandria Stadium	N/A	boxscore
30/06/1982	Launceston Casino City	78–86	West Adelaide Bearcats	Dowling Street Stadium	N/A	boxscore

=== Round 17 ===
Date	Home	Score	Away	Venue	Crowd	Box Score
5/06/1982	Geelong Cats	83–72	Sydney SuperSonics	Corio Leisure Centre	N/A	boxscore
5/06/1982	St. Kilda Saints	92–59	Bankstown Bruins	Albert Park Basketball Stadium	N/A	boxscore
6/06/1982	West Adelaide Bearcats	96–85	Illawarra Hawks	Apollo Entertainment Centre	N/A	boxscore
6/06/1982	Adelaide City Eagles	120–96	Illawarra Hawks	Apollo Entertainment Centre	N/A	boxscore
6/06/1982	Coburg Giants	85–76	Geelong Cats	Ken Watson Stadium	N/A	boxscore
6/06/1982	Launceston Casino City	87–80	Sydney SuperSonics	Dowling Street Stadium	N/A	boxscore
6/06/1982	Nunawading Spectres	81–61	Bankstown Bruins	Burwood Stadium	N/A	boxscore
6/06/1982	Brisbane Bullets	77–78	Newcastle Falcons	Auchenflower Stadium	N/A	boxscore

=== Round 18 ===
Date	Home	Score	Away	Venue	Crowd	Box Score
11/06/1982	Westate Wildcats	70–80	Sydney SuperSonics	Perry Lakes Basketball Stadium	N/A	boxscore
12/06/1982	Geelong Cats	90–77	St. Kilda Saints	Corio Leisure Centre	N/A	boxscore
12/06/1982	Nunawading Spectres	88–78	Newcastle Falcons	Burwood Stadium	N/A	boxscore
12/06/1982	Adelaide City Eagles	103–87	Canberra Cannons	Apollo Entertainment Centre	N/A	boxscore
13/06/1982	St. Kilda Saints	98–92	Newcastle Falcons	Albert Park Basketball Stadium	N/A	boxscore
13/06/1982	West Adelaide Bearcats	107–71	Canberra Cannons	Apollo Entertainment Centre	N/A	boxscore
13/06/1982	Coburg Giants	109–51	Sydney SuperSonics	Ken Watson Stadium	N/A	boxscore
13/06/1982	Bankstown Bruins	81–85	Illawarra Hawks	Bankstown Basketball Stadium	N/A	boxscore

=== Round 19 ===
Date	Home	Score	Away	Venue	Crowd	Box Score
18/06/1982	Sydney SuperSonics	85–93	Illawarra Hawks	Alexandria Stadium	N/A	boxscore
19/06/1982	Launceston Casino City	106–119	Adelaide City Eagles	Dowling Street Stadium	N/A	boxscore
19/06/1982	St. Kilda Saints	86–71	Coburg Giants	Albert Park Basketball Stadium	N/A	boxscore
19/06/1982	Westate Wildcats	89–97	West Adelaide Bearcats	Perry Lakes Basketball Stadium	N/A	boxscore
19/06/1982	Canberra Cannons	87–60	Bankstown Bruins	AIS Arena	N/A	boxscore
19/06/1982	Newcastle Falcons	95–81	Illawarra Hawks	Newcastle Sports Entertainment Centre	N/A	boxscore
20/06/1982	Geelong Cats	98–83	Adelaide City Eagles	Corio Leisure Centre	N/A	boxscore
20/06/1982	Brisbane Bullets	77–63	Sydney SuperSonics	Auchenflower Stadium	N/A	boxscore
20/06/1982	Nunawading Spectres	75–64	Coburg Giants	Burwood Stadium	N/A	boxscore

=== Round 20 ===
Date	Home	Score	Away	Venue	Crowd	Box Score
26/06/1982	Canberra Cannons	88–89	Geelong Cats	AIS Arena	N/A	boxscore
26/06/1982	Nunawading Spectres	90–86	Adelaide City Eagles	Burwood Stadium	N/A	boxscore
26/06/1982	Newcastle Falcons	101–73	Brisbane Bullets	Newcastle Sports Entertainment Centre	N/A	boxscore
27/06/1982	Sydney SuperSonics	87–91	Geelong Cats	Alexandria Stadium	N/A	boxscore
27/06/1982	St. Kilda Saints	116–95	Adelaide City Eagles	Albert Park Basketball Stadium	N/A	boxscore
27/06/1982	Bankstown Bruins	77–60	Brisbane Bullets	Bankstown Basketball Stadium	N/A	boxscore
27/06/1982	Coburg Giants	91–78	Illawarra Hawks	Albert Park Basketball Stadium	N/A	boxscore

=== Round 21 ===
Date	Home	Score	Away	Venue	Crowd	Box Score
2/07/1982	Westate Wildcats	110–95	Adelaide City Eagles	Perry Lakes Basketball Stadium	N/A	boxscore
3/07/1982	Illawarra Hawks	92–90	Canberra Cannons	Beaton Park Stadium	N/A	boxscore
3/07/1982	Newcastle Falcons	99–87	West Adelaide Bearcats	Newcastle Sports Entertainment Centre	N/A	boxscore
3/07/1982	Geelong Cats	84–74	Nunawading Spectres	Corio Leisure Centre	N/A	boxscore
3/07/1982	Launceston Casino City	83–81	Nunawading Spectres	Dowling Street Stadium	N/A	boxscore
4/07/1982	Brisbane Bullets	70–69	Canberra Cannons	Auchenflower Stadium	N/A	boxscore
4/07/1982	Coburg Giants	91–86	Adelaide City Eagles	Ken Watson Stadium	N/A	boxscore
4/07/1982	Bankstown Bruins	81–117	West Adelaide Bearcats	Bankstown Basketball Stadium	N/A	boxscore
4/07/1982	Newcastle Falcons	93–80	Sydney SuperSonics	Newcastle Sports Entertainment Centre	N/A	boxscore

=== Round 22 ===
Date	Home	Score	Away	Venue	Crowd	Box Score
9/07/1982	Westate Wildcats	85–89	Launceston Casino City	Perry Lakes Basketball Stadium	N/A	boxscore
10/07/1982	Adelaide City Eagles	104–103	Geelong Cats	Apollo Entertainment Centre	N/A	boxscore
10/07/1982	Canberra Cannons	85–75	Brisbane Bullets	AIS Arena	N/A	boxscore
10/07/1982	St. Kilda Saints	119–87	Illawarra Hawks	Albert Park Basketball Stadium	N/A	boxscore
10/07/1982	Newcastle Falcons	89–71	Bankstown Bruins	Newcastle Sports Entertainment Centre	N/A	boxscore
11/07/1982	Coburg Giants	112–85	Launceston Casino City	Ken Watson Stadium	N/A	boxscore
11/07/1982	West Adelaide Bearcats	110–81	Geelong Cats	Apollo Entertainment Centre	N/A	boxscore
11/07/1982	Sydney SuperSonics	83–85	Brisbane Bullets	Alexandria Stadium	N/A	boxscore
11/07/1982	Nunawading Spectres	103–73	Illawarra Hawks	Burwood Stadium	N/A	boxscore

== Ladder ==
Pos	1982 NBL season											
Pos	Team	Pld	W	L	PCT	Last 5	Streak	Home	Away	PF	PA	PP
1	West Adelaide Bearcats	26	21	5	80.77%	4–1	W2	12–1	9–4	2525	2177	115.99%
2	Geelong Cats	26	20	6	76.92%	3–2	L2	11–2	9–4	2310	2183	105.82%
3	Nunawading Spectres	26	19	7	73.08%	3–2	W1	13–0	6–7	2209	1993	110.84%
4	Coburg Giants	26	18	8	69.23%	3–2	W3	11–2	7–6	2260	2067	109.34%
5	Newcastle Falcons^{1}	26	17	9	65.38%	5–0	W5	11–2	6–7	2395	2258	106.07%
6	St. Kilda Saints^{1}	26	17	9	65.38%	4–1	W4	10–3	7–6	2185	2090	104.55%
7	Adelaide City Eagles	26	15	11	57.69%	1–4	W1	10–3	5–8	2457	2356	104.29%
8	Brisbane Bullets	26	12	14	46.15%	2–3	W1	7–6	5–8	2059	2119	97.17%
9	Illawarra Hawks	26	11	15	42.31%	1–4	L2	8–5	3–10	2382	2444	97.46%
10	Westate Wildcats	26	10	16	38.46%	1–4	L1	7–6	3–10	2260	2431	92.97%
11	Canberra Cannons	26	8	18	30.77%	2–3	W1	7–6	1–12	2132	2221	95.99%
12	Sydney Supersonics	26	7	19	26.92%	0–5	L6	5–8	2–11	2022	2232	90.59%
13	Launceston Casino City	26	5	21	19.23%	3–2	L1	4–9	1–12	2231	2483	89.85%
14	Bankstown Bruins	26	2	24	07.69%	1–4	L2	2–11	0–13	1948	2321	83.93%

Updated to match(es) played on 11 July 1982. Source: NBL.com.au

The NBL tie-breaker system as outlined in the NBL Rules and Regulations states that in the case of an identical win–loss record, the results in games played between the teams will determine order of seeding.

^{1}Head-to-Head between Newcastle Falcons and St. Kilda Saints (1-1). Newcastle Falcons won For and Against (+2).

== Finals ==
The NBL finals series in 1982 consisted of two semifinal games, and one championship-deciding grand final. All three of these finals games were sudden death.

=== Playoff bracket ===
Semifinals
1	West Adelaide Bearcats	94
4	Coburg Giants	74
2	Geelong Cats	71
3	Nunawading Spectres	59

Grand Final
1	West Adelaide Bearcats	80
2	Geelong Cats	74

=== Semifinals ===
Date	Home	Score	Away	Venue	Crowd	Box Score
16/07/1982	Geelong Cats	71–59	Nunawading Spectres	Newcastle Sports Entertainment Centre	N/A	boxscore
16/07/1982	West Adelaide Bearcats	94–74	Coburg Giants	Newcastle Sports Entertainment Centre	N/A	boxscore

=== Grand Final ===
Date	Home	Score	Away	Venue	Crowd	Box Score
18/07/1982	West Adelaide Bearcats	80–74	Geelong Cats	Newcastle Sports Entertainment Centre	N/A	boxscore

== Awards ==
=== Statistics leaders ===
Category	Player	Team	Stat
Points	Reg Biddings	Adelaide City Eagles	782 pts / 26 games
Rebounds per game	George Morrow	Newcastle Falcons	15.0 rpg / 26 games
Field goal percentage	Ian Manson	Geelong Cats	64.3% (56/87)
Free throw percentage	Reg Biddings	Adelaide City Eagles	88.3% (182/206)

=== Regular season ===
- Most Valuable Player: Al Green (West Adelaide Bearcats)
- Best Defensive Player: Phil Smyth (St Kilda Saints)
- Coach of the Year: Cal Bruton (Geelong Cats)
- All-NBL Team:
  - George Morrow (Newcastle Falcons)
  - James Crawford (Geelong Cats)
  - Leroy Loggins (West Adelaide Bearcats)
  - Phil Smyth (St Kilda Saints)
  - Larry Sengstock (Brisbane Bullets)
