= 1999–2000 NBL season =

Professional basketball season

- League: National Basketball League
- Season: 1999–2000
- Dates: 2 October 1999 – 12 April 2000
- Teams: 11
- TV partners: Australia: ABC; Fox Sports

Regular season
- Season champions: Adelaide 36ers
- Season MVP: (Australia) Paul Rogers (Perth)

Finals
- Champions: Perth Wildcats (4th title)
- Runners-up: Victoria Titans
- Semifinalists: Adelaide 36ers Townsville Crocodiles
- Finals MVP: (United States) Marcus Timmons (Perth)

Statistical leaders
Points	(Australia) Andrew Gaze (Melbourne)	28.9
Rebounds	(Australia) Mark Bradtke (Melbourne)	14.8
Assists	(Australia) Darryl McDonald (Victoria)	7.8

NBL seasons
- ← 1998–99 2000–01 →

The 1999–2000 NBL season was the 22nd season of competition since its establishment in 1979. A total of 11 teams contested the league. The Newcastle Falcons folded and were replaced by the Cairns Taipans.

== Regular season ==
The 1999-2000 regular season took place over 24 rounds between 2 October 1999 and 11 March 2000.

=== Round 1 ===
Date	Home	Score	Away	Venue	Crowd	Boxscore
2/10/1999	Adelaide 36ers	109–89	Perth Wildcats	Adelaide Arena	N/A	boxscore
2/10/1999	West Sydney Razorbacks	98–82	Brisbane Bullets	Sydney Super Dome	17,143	boxscore
2/10/1999	Sydney Kings	98–76	Canberra Cannons	Sydney Super Dome	17,143	boxscore
2/10/1999	Melbourne Tigers	98–71	Cairns Taipans	Melbourne Park	N/A	boxscore
2/10/1999	Victoria Titans	106–95	Townsville Crocodiles	Melbourne Park	N/A	boxscore

=== Round 2 ===
Date	Home	Score	Away	Venue	Crowd	Boxscore
8/10/1999	West Sydney Razorbacks	104–78	Victoria Titans	Whitlam Centre	N/A	boxscore
9/10/1999	Brisbane Bullets	85–113	Melbourne Tigers	Brisbane Convention & Exhibition Centre	N/A	boxscore
9/10/1999	Townsville Crocodiles	99–88	Wollongong Hawks	Townsville Entertainment Centre	4,520	boxscore
12/10/1999	Cairns Taipans	78–104	Sydney Kings	Cairns Convention Centre	4,963	boxscore
12/10/1999	Townsville Crocodiles	123–81	Perth Wildcats	Cairns Convention Centre	4,963	boxscore

=== Round 3 ===
Date	Home	Score	Away	Venue	Crowd	Boxscore
15/10/1999	West Sydney Razorbacks	95–85	Perth Wildcats	Whitlam Centre	N/A	boxscore
15/10/1999	Victoria Titans	97–82	Canberra Cannons	Melbourne Park	N/A	boxscore
16/10/1999	Melbourne Tigers	77–112	Victoria Titans	Melbourne Park	N/A	boxscore
16/10/1999	Canberra Cannons	84–108	Perth Wildcats	AIS Arena	N/A	boxscore
16/10/1999	Brisbane Bullets	77–76	Sydney Kings	Brisbane Convention & Exhibition Centre	N/A	boxscore
17/10/1999	Wollongong Hawks	99–77	Sydney Kings	WIN Entertainment Centre	N/A	boxscore

=== Round 4 ===
Date	Home	Score	Away	Venue	Crowd	Boxscore
20/10/1999	Wollongong Hawks	73–86	Victoria Titans	Ballarat Stadium	1,100	boxscore
22/10/1999	Perth Wildcats	77–69	Cairns Taipans	Perth Entertainment Centre	N/A	boxscore
23/10/1999	Adelaide 36ers	91–84	Cairns Taipans	Adelaide Arena	N/A	boxscore
23/10/1999	Wollongong Hawks	86–78	Canberra Cannons	WIN Entertainment Centre	3,516	boxscore
23/10/1999	Brisbane Bullets	101–86	West Sydney Razorbacks	Brisbane Convention & Exhibition Centre	N/A	boxscore
23/10/1999	Sydney Kings	88–98	Townsville Crocodiles	Sydney Super Dome	4,496	boxscore

=== Round 5 ===
Date	Home	Score	Away	Venue	Crowd	Boxscore
27/10/1999	Canberra Cannons	89–102	Melbourne Tigers	Bendigo Stadium	N/A	boxscore
29/10/1999	Melbourne Tigers	91–103	Sydney Kings	Melbourne Park	N/A	boxscore
29/10/1999	Adelaide 36ers	105–80	Wollongong Hawks	Adelaide Arena	N/A	boxscore
30/10/1999	Canberra Cannons	85–96	Adelaide 36ers	AIS Arena	N/A	boxscore
30/10/1999	Perth Wildcats	89–86	Wollongong Hawks	Perth Entertainment Centre	N/A	boxscore
30/10/1999	Cairns Taipans	75–103	Townsville Crocodiles	Cairns Convention Centre	N/A	boxscore
30/10/1999	West Sydney Razorbacks	94–80	Brisbane Bullets	Whitlam Centre	N/A	boxscore
1/11/1999	Victoria Titans	75–74	Perth Wildcats	Melbourne Park	N/A	boxscore

=== Round 6 ===
Date	Home	Score	Away	Venue	Crowd	Boxscore
5/11/1999	Melbourne Tigers	78–71	Cairns Taipans	Melbourne Park	N/A	boxscore
5/11/1999	Wollongong Hawks	90–92	Perth Wildcats	WIN Entertainment Centre	N/A	boxscore
5/11/1999	Sydney Kings	96–86	Brisbane Bullets	Sydney Super Dome	N/A	boxscore
6/11/1999	Townsville Crocodiles	131–127	Adelaide 36ers	Townsville Entertainment Centre	N/A	boxscore
6/11/1999	Victoria Titans	101–75	Brisbane Bullets	Melbourne Park	N/A	boxscore
6/11/1999	Canberra Cannons	98–79	Cairns Taipans	AIS Arena	N/A	boxscore

=== Round 7 ===
Date	Home	Score	Away	Venue	Crowd	Boxscore
12/11/1999	Melbourne Tigers	84–104	Adelaide 36ers	Melbourne Park	N/A	boxscore
12/11/1999	Canberra Cannons	85–87	Victoria Titans	AIS Arena	N/A	boxscore
12/11/1999	Townsville Crocodiles	101–115	Sydney Kings	Townsville Entertainment Centre	N/A	boxscore
12/11/1999	Wollongong Hawks	96–87	Brisbane Bullets	WIN Entertainment Centre	N/A	boxscore
12/11/1999	Perth Wildcats	113–102	West Sydney Razorbacks	Perth Entertainment Centre	N/A	boxscore
13/11/1999	Brisbane Bullets	77–87	Adelaide 36ers	Brisbane Convention & Exhibition Centre	N/A	boxscore
13/11/1999	Cairns Taipans	99–86	Sydney Kings	Cairns Convention Centre	3,800	boxscore

=== Round 8 ===
Date	Home	Score	Away	Venue	Crowd	Boxscore
19/11/1999	Adelaide 36ers	113–106	Townsville Crocodiles	Adelaide Arena	N/A	boxscore
20/11/1999	Victoria Titans	113–112	Melbourne Tigers	Melbourne Park	N/A	boxscore
20/11/1999	Perth Wildcats	109–98	Townsville Crocodiles	Perth Entertainment Centre	N/A	boxscore
20/11/1999	West Sydney Razorbacks	99–111	Wollongong Hawks	Whitlam Centre	N/A	boxscore
21/11/1999	Sydney Kings	77–75	Cairns Taipans	Sydney Super Dome	N/A	boxscore

=== Round 9 ===
Date	Home	Score	Away	Venue	Crowd	Boxscore
26/11/1999	Melbourne Tigers	103–97	West Sydney Razorbacks	Melbourne Park	N/A	boxscore
27/11/1999	Perth Wildcats	109–82	Brisbane Bullets	Perth Entertainment Centre	N/A	boxscore
27/11/1999	Victoria Titans	89–80	Sydney Kings	Melbourne Park	N/A	boxscore
27/11/1999	Townsville Crocodiles	116–82	Cairns Taipans	Townsville Entertainment Centre	N/A	boxscore
27/11/1999	West Sydney Razorbacks	103–90	Canberra Cannons	Whitlam Centre	N/A	boxscore
27/11/1999	Adelaide 36ers	90–100	Melbourne Tigers	Adelaide Arena	N/A	boxscore
30/11/1999	Cairns Taipans	82–83	Wollongong Hawks	Cairns Convention Centre	N/A	boxscore
30/11/1999	Adelaide 36ers	97–100	Sydney Kings	Derwent Entertainment Centre	N/A	boxscore

=== Round 10 ===
Date	Home	Score	Away	Venue	Crowd	Boxscore
3/12/1999	Adelaide 36ers	111–86	Canberra Cannons	Adelaide Arena	N/A	boxscore
3/12/1999	Cairns Taipans	78–79	Brisbane Bullets	Cairns Convention Centre	N/A	boxscore
3/12/1999	Townsville Crocodiles	108–90	Wollongong Hawks	Townsville Entertainment Centre	4,368	boxscore
3/12/1999	West Sydney Razorbacks	121–107	Melbourne Tigers	Whitlam Centre	N/A	boxscore
4/12/1999	Perth Wildcats	99–85	Canberra Cannons	Perth Entertainment Centre	N/A	boxscore
4/12/1999	Brisbane Bullets	75–86	Victoria Titans	Brisbane Convention & Exhibition Centre	N/A	boxscore
4/12/1999	Sydney Kings	72–99	Adelaide 36ers	Sydney Super Dome	N/A	boxscore

=== Round 11 ===
Date	Home	Score	Away	Venue	Crowd	Boxscore
10/12/1999	Brisbane Bullets	93–101	Perth Wildcats	Brisbane Convention & Exhibition Centre	N/A	boxscore
10/12/1999	Cairns Taipans	63–76	Canberra Cannons	Cairns Convention Centre	N/A	boxscore
10/12/1999	Victoria Titans	100–81	West Sydney Razorbacks	Melbourne Park	N/A	boxscore
10/12/1999	Wollongong Hawks	103–111	Adelaide 36ers	WIN Entertainment Centre	3,565	boxscore
11/12/1999	Melbourne Tigers	102–107	Perth Wildcats	Melbourne Park	N/A	boxscore
11/12/1999	Townsville Crocodiles	117–88	Canberra Cannons	Townsville Entertainment Centre	N/A	boxscore
11/12/1999	Sydney Kings	81–88	West Sydney Razorbacks	Sydney SuperDome	17,803	boxscore
12/12/1999	Adelaide 36ers	94–70	Brisbane Bullets	Adelaide Arena	N/A	boxscore

=== Round 12 ===
Date	Home	Score	Away	Venue	Crowd	Boxscore
17/12/1999	Wollongong Hawks	97–120	Sydney Kings	WIN Entertainment Centre	3,348	boxscore
17/12/1999	Victoria Titans	90–98	Perth Wildcats	Melbourne Park	N/A	boxscore
17/12/1999	West Sydney Razorbacks	110–118	Townsville Crocodiles	Whitlam Centre	N/A	boxscore
18/12/1999	Canberra Cannons	101–128	Townsville Crocodiles	AIS Arena	N/A	boxscore
18/12/1999	Melbourne Tigers	122–95	Brisbane Bullets	Melbourne Park	N/A	boxscore
18/12/1999	Cairns Taipans	89–98	Adelaide 36ers	Cairns Convention Centre	N/A	boxscore
18/12/1999	Sydney Kings	84–115	Perth Wildcats	Sydney Super Dome	N/A	boxscore

=== Round 13 ===
Date	Home	Score	Away	Venue	Crowd	Boxscore
23/12/1999	Wollongong Hawks	84–93	West Sydney Razorbacks	WIN Entertainment Centre	N/A	boxscore
26/12/1999	Victoria Titans	77–103	Adelaide 36ers	Melbourne Park	N/A	boxscore
26/12/1999	Canberra Cannons	121–94	West Sydney Razorbacks	AIS Arena	N/A	boxscore
27/12/1999	Melbourne Tigers	85–98	Wollongong Hawks	Melbourne Park	N/A	boxscore
27/12/1999	Brisbane Bullets	79–84	Cairns Taipans	Brisbane Convention & Exhibition Centre	N/A	boxscore

=== Round 14 ===
Date	Home	Score	Away	Venue	Crowd	Boxscore
30/12/1999	Wollongong Hawks	86–88	Victoria Titans	WIN Entertainment Centre	N/A	boxscore
30/12/1999	West Sydney Razorbacks	87–123	Sydney Kings	Whitlam Centre	N/A	boxscore
30/12/1999	Townsville Crocodiles	103–78	Brisbane Bullets	Townsville Entertainment Centre	N/A	boxscore
2/01/2000	Adelaide 36ers	101–89	Perth Wildcats	Adelaide Arena	N/A	boxscore
2/01/2000	Cairns Taipans	64–82	Canberra Cannons	Cairns Convention Centre	N/A	boxscore

=== Round 15 ===
Date	Home	Score	Away	Venue	Crowd	Boxscore
7/01/2000	Perth Wildcats	78–72	Victoria Titans	Perth Entertainment Centre	N/A	boxscore
7/01/2000	Cairns Taipans	67–94	West Sydney Razorbacks	Cairns Convention Centre	N/A	boxscore
7/01/2000	Wollongong Hawks	94–112	Melbourne Tigers	WIN Entertainment Centre	N/A	boxscore
8/01/2000	Brisbane Bullets	85–83	Melbourne Tigers	Brisbane Convention & Exhibition Centre	N/A	boxscore
8/01/2000	Adelaide 36ers	94–75	Victoria Titans	Adelaide Arena	N/A	boxscore
8/01/2000	Canberra Cannons	108–105	Sydney Kings	AIS Arena	N/A	boxscore
8/01/2000	Townsville Crocodiles	101–104	West Sydney Razorbacks	Townsville Entertainment Centre	N/A	boxscore

=== Round 16 ===
Date	Home	Score	Away	Venue	Crowd	Boxscore
14/01/2000	Adelaide 36ers	124–99	Sydney Kings	Adelaide Arena	N/A	boxscore
14/01/2000	Brisbane Bullets	99–90	Wollongong Hawks	Brisbane Convention & Exhibition Centre	N/A	boxscore
14/01/2000	Townsville Crocodiles	102–97	Melbourne Tigers	Townsville Entertainment Centre	N/A	boxscore
15/01/2000	Perth Wildcats	106–91	Sydney Kings	Perth Entertainment Centre	N/A	boxscore
15/01/2000	Cairns Taipans	82–109	Melbourne Tigers	Cairns Convention Centre	N/A	boxscore
16/01/2000	West Sydney Razorbacks	95–102	Townsville Crocodiles	Whitlam Centre	N/A	boxscore

=== Round 17 ===
Date	Home	Score	Away	Venue	Crowd	Boxscore
21/01/2000	Wollongong Hawks	94–86	Cairns Taipans	WIN Entertainment Centre	N/A	boxscore
21/01/2000	West Sydney Razorbacks	84–101	Adelaide 36ers	Whitlam Centre	N/A	boxscore
22/01/2000	Canberra Cannons	98–121	Townsville Crocodiles	AIS Arena	N/A	boxscore
22/01/2000	Sydney Kings	75–106	Victoria Titans	Sydney Super Dome	N/A	boxscore
22/01/2000	Perth Wildcats	86–104	Melbourne Tigers	Perth Entertainment Centre	N/A	boxscore

=== Round 18 ===
Date	Home	Score	Away	Venue	Crowd	Boxscore
26/01/2000	West Sydney Razorbacks	93–98	Canberra Cannons	WIN Entertainment Centre	N/A	boxscore
26/01/2000	Wollongong Hawks	88–93	Perth Wildcats	WIN Entertainment Centre	N/A	boxscore
28/01/2000	Brisbane Bullets	99–73	Canberra Cannons	Brisbane Convention & Exhibition Centre	N/A	boxscore
28/01/2000	Townsville Crocodiles	88–80	Victoria Titans	Townsville Entertainment Centre	N/A	boxscore
29/01/2000	Adelaide 36ers	106–102	Melbourne Tigers	Adelaide Arena	N/A	boxscore
29/01/2000	Cairns Taipans	57–84	Victoria Titans	Cairns Convention Centre	N/A	boxscore
29/01/2000	Sydney Kings	114–100	West Sydney Razorbacks	Sydney Super Dome	N/A	boxscore

=== Round 19 ===
Date	Home	Score	Away	Venue	Crowd	Boxscore
4/02/2000	Melbourne Tigers	106–88	Sydney Kings	Melbourne Park	N/A	boxscore
4/02/2000	Townsville Crocodiles	78–94	Perth Wildcats	Townsville Entertainment Centre	N/A	boxscore
4/02/2000	Canberra Cannons	94–89	Brisbane Bullets	AIS Arena	N/A	boxscore
5/02/2000	Wollongong Hawks	109–104	West Sydney Razorbacks	WIN Entertainment Centre	2,999	boxscore
5/02/2000	Victoria Titans	83–75	Adelaide 36ers	Melbourne Park	N/A	boxscore
5/02/2000	Cairns Taipans	72–87	Perth Wildcats	Cairns Convention Centre	N/A	boxscore
5/02/2000	Sydney Kings	110–93	Brisbane Bullets	Sydney Super Dome	N/A	boxscore

=== Round 20 ===
Date	Home	Score	Away	Venue	Crowd	Boxscore
10/02/2000	West Sydney Razorbacks	92–69	Victoria Titans	Whitlam Centre	N/A	boxscore
11/02/2000	Adelaide 36ers	95–92	Wollongong Hawks	Adelaide Arena	N/A	boxscore
12/02/2000	Melbourne Tigers	88–99	Victoria Titans	Melbourne Park	N/A	boxscore
12/02/2000	Perth Wildcats	120–93	Cairns Taipans	Perth Entertainment Centre	N/A	boxscore
12/02/2000	Canberra Cannons	109–95	Wollongong Hawks	AIS Arena	N/A	boxscore
12/02/2000	Townsville Crocodiles	122–73	Brisbane Bullets	Townsville Entertainment Centre	N/A	boxscore

=== Round 21 ===
Date	Home	Score	Away	Venue	Crowd	Boxscore
17/02/2000	Wollongong Hawks	90–75	Cairns Taipans	WIN Entertainment Centre	N/A	boxscore
18/02/2000	Victoria Titans	103–87	Cairns Taipans	Melbourne Park	N/A	boxscore
18/02/2000	Adelaide 36ers	101–77	Brisbane Bullets	Adelaide Arena	N/A	boxscore
18/02/2000	Sydney Kings	100–115	Melbourne Tigers	Sydney Super Dome	N/A	boxscore
19/02/2000	Melbourne Tigers	97–123	Townsville Crocodiles	Melbourne Park	N/A	boxscore
19/02/2000	Brisbane Bullets	88–90	Canberra Cannons	Brisbane Convention & Exhibition Centre	N/A	boxscore
19/02/2000	West Sydney Razorbacks	98–109	Perth Wildcats	Whitlam Centre	N/A	boxscore

=== Round 22 ===
Date	Home	Score	Away	Venue	Crowd	Boxscore
25/02/2000	Melbourne Tigers	94–89	Canberra Cannons	Melbourne Park	N/A	boxscore
25/02/2000	Wollongong Hawks	98–114	Townsville Crocodiles	WIN Entertainment Centre	N/A	boxscore
25/02/2000	West Sydney Razorbacks	106–96	Cairns Taipans	Whitlam Centre	N/A	boxscore
26/02/2000	Victoria Titans	74–81	Townsville Crocodiles	Melbourne Park	N/A	boxscore
26/02/2000	Perth Wildcats	88–86	Adelaide 36ers	Perth Entertainment Centre	N/A	boxscore
26/02/2000	Canberra Cannons	107–103	Sydney Kings	AIS Arena	N/A	boxscore
26/02/2000	Brisbane Bullets	85–71	Cairns Taipans	Brisbane Convention & Exhibition Centre	N/A	boxscore

=== Round 23 ===
Date	Home	Score	Away	Venue	Crowd	Boxscore
3/03/2000	Canberra Cannons	99–96	Melbourne Tigers	AIS Arena	N/A	boxscore
3/03/2000	Cairns Taipans	75–129	Adelaide 36ers	Cairns Convention Centre	N/A	boxscore
3/03/2000	Victoria Titans	88–78	Wollongong Hawks	Melbourne Park	N/A	boxscore
4/03/2000	Melbourne Tigers	118–101	West Sydney Razorbacks	Melbourne Park	N/A	boxscore
4/03/2000	Perth Wildcats	93–78	Brisbane Bullets	Perth Entertainment Centre	N/A	boxscore
4/03/2000	Townsville Crocodiles	88–82	Adelaide 36ers	Townsville Entertainment Centre	N/A	boxscore
4/03/2000	Sydney Kings	97–98	Wollongong Hawks	Sydney Super Dome	N/A	boxscore

=== Round 24 ===
Date	Home	Score	Away	Venue	Crowd	Boxscore
10/03/2000	Victoria Titans	118–87	Canberra Cannons	Melbourne Park	N/A	boxscore
10/03/2000	Cairns Taipans	87–99	Townsville Crocodiles	Cairns Convention Centre	N/A	boxscore
11/03/2000	Perth Wildcats	88–72	Melbourne Tigers	Perth Entertainment Centre	N/A	boxscore
11/03/2000	Brisbane Bullets	76–97	Townsville Crocodiles	Brisbane Convention & Exhibition Centre	N/A	boxscore
11/03/2000	Sydney Kings	80–87	Victoria Titans	Sydney Super Dome	N/A	boxscore
11/03/2000	Canberra Cannons	94–105	Wollongong Hawks	AIS Arena	N/A	boxscore
11/03/2000	Adelaide 36ers	93–85	West Sydney Razorbacks	Adelaide Arena	N/A	boxscore

== Ladder ==
Pos	1999–2000 NBL season											
Pos	Team	Pld	W	L	PCT	Last 5	Streak	Home	Away	PF	PA	PP
1	Adelaide 36ers^{1}	28	22	6	78.57%	3–2	W1	13–2	9–4	2822	2470	114.25%
2	Townsville Crocodiles^{1}	28	22	6	78.57%	5–0	W7	11–3	11–3	2960	2606	113.58%
3	Perth Wildcats^{1}	28	22	6	78.57%	5–0	W8	12–1	10–5	2677	2500	107.08%
4	Victoria Titans	28	20	8	71.43%	4–1	W3	11–3	9–5	2523	2360	106.91%
5	Melbourne Tigers	28	14	14	50.00%	2–3	L1	7–7	7–7	2767	2698	102.56%
6	West Sydney Razorbacks	28	12	16	42.86%	2–3	L2	8–7	4–9	2708	2754	98.33%
7	Wollongong Hawks^{2}	28	11	17	39.29%	3–2	W2	6–9	5–8	2581	2665	96.85%
8	Canberra Cannons^{2}	28	11	17	39.29%	2–3	L2	7–7	4–10	2552	2738	93.21%
9	Sydney Kings^{2}	28	11	17	39.29%	1–4	L4	5–8	6–9	2642	2702	97.78%
10	Brisbane Bullets	28	7	21	25.00%	1–4	L2	6–7	1–14	2343	2648	88.48%
11	Cairns Taipans	28	2	26	07.14%	0–5	L13	1–13	1–13	2191	2625	83.47%

Updated to match(es) played on 11 March 2000. Source: NBL.com.au

The NBL tie-breaker system as outlined in the NBL Rules and Regulations states that in the case of an identical win–loss record, the results in games played between the teams will determine order of seeding.

^{1}3-way Head-to-Head between Adelaide 36ers (3-3), Townsville Crocodiles (3-3) and Perth Wildcats (3-3). Adelaide 36ers won For and Against (+27), Townsville Crocodiles (+18), Perth Wildcats(-45).

^{2}3-way Head-to-Head between Wollongong Hawks (4-2), Canberra Cannons (3-3) and Sydney Kings (2-4).

== Finals ==
=== Playoff bracket ===
Elimination Finals
4	Victoria Titans	94	78	105
5	Melbourne Tigers	101	70	96
3	Perth Wildcats	80	99	82
6	West Sydney Razorbacks	91	88	74

Semifinals
1	Adelaide 36ers	86	95	89
4	Victoria Titans	101	72	93
2	Townsville Crocodiles	101	101	84
3	Perth Wildcats	104	78	104

Grand Final
3	Perth Wildcats	84	83	X
4	Victoria Titans	78	76	X

=== Elimination Finals ===
Date	Home	Score	Away	Venue	Crowd	Boxscore
15/03/2000	Melbourne Tigers	101–94	Victoria Titans	Melbourne Park	N/A	boxscore
15/03/2000	West Sydney Razorbacks	91–80	Perth Wildcats	Whitlam Centre	N/A	boxscore
17/03/2000	Perth Wildcats	99–88	West Sydney Razorbacks	Perth Entertainment Centre	N/A	boxscore
18/03/2000	Victoria Titans	78–70	Melbourne Tigers	Melbourne Park	N/A	boxscore
19/03/2000	Perth Wildcats	82–74	West Sydney Razorbacks	Perth Entertainment Centre	N/A	boxscore
20/03/2000	Victoria Titans	105–96	Melbourne Tigers	Melbourne Park	N/A	boxscore

=== Semi-finals ===
Date	Home	Score	Away	Venue	Crowd	Boxscore
24/03/2000	Perth Wildcats	104–101	Townsville Crocodiles	Perth Entertainment Centre	N/A	boxscore
25/03/2000	Victoria Titans	101–86	Adelaide 36ers	Melbourne Park	N/A	boxscore
31/03/2000	Townsville Crocodiles	101–78	Perth Wildcats	Townsville Entertainment Centre	N/A	boxscore
1/04/2000	Adelaide 36ers	95–72	Victoria Titans	Adelaide Arena	N/A	boxscore
2/04/2000	Townsville Crocodiles	84–104	Perth Wildcats	Townsville Entertainment Centre	N/A	boxscore
3/04/2000	Adelaide 36ers	89–93	Victoria Titans	Adelaide Arena	N/A	boxscore

=== Grand Final ===
Date	Home	Score	Away	Venue	Crowd	Boxscore
7/04/2000	Victoria Titans	78–84	Perth Wildcats	Melbourne Park	N/A	boxscore
12/04/2000	Perth Wildcats	83–76	Victoria Titans	Perth Entertainment Centre	N/A	boxscore

== 1999–00 NBL statistics leaders ==
Category	Player	Team	Stat
Points per game	Andrew Gaze	Melbourne Tigers	29.2
Rebounds per game	Mark Bradtke	Melbourne Tigers	14.8
Assists per game	Darryl McDonald	Victoria Titans	7.8
Steals per game	Darryl McDonald	Victoria Titans	2.5
Blocks per game	Simon Dwight	West Sydney Razorbacks	3.0
Free throw percentage	Derek Rucker	West Sydney Razorbacks	91.8%
Three-point field goal percentage	Mike Kelly	Townsville Crocodiles	43.9%

== NBL awards ==
- Most Valuable Player: Paul Rogers, Perth Wildcats
- Rookie of the Year: Derek Moore, Sydney Kings
- Best Defensive Player: Darnell Mee, Adelaide 36ers
- Best Sixth Man: Ben Knight, Townsville Crocodiles
- Most Improved Player: Andrew Goodwin, Townsville Crocodiles
- Coach of the Year: Ian Stacker, Townsville Crocodiles

== All NBL Team ==
#	Player	Team
PG	Brett Maher	Adelaide 36ers
SG	Andrew Gaze	Melbourne Tigers
SF	Sam Mackinnon	Townsville Crocodiles
PF	Mark Bradtke	Melbourne Tigers
C	Paul Rogers	Perth Wildcats
