= Ian Stacker =

Australian basketball player and coach

Personal information
- Born: 1957 (age 68–69) (Note: A 1992 Official NBL Basketball Card listed Stacker with birth details of 26 May 1947 in Oldham, England. The legitimacy of this is brought into question due to the NBL noting him as 61 years old in February 2019.)
- Listed height: 181 cm (5 ft 11 in)

Career information
- Playing career: 1979–1987
- Position: Guard
- Coaching career: 1988–2020

Career history

Playing
- 1979–1980: Melbourne Tigers
- 1981–1983: Frankston Bears
- 1984–1986: Nunawading Spectres
- 1987: Dandenong Rangers

Coaching
- 1988–1991: Eastside Spectres (assistant)
- 1992–1995: South East Melbourne Magic (assistant)
- 1996: Geelong Supercats
- 1998: North Melbourne Giants (assistant)
- 1998–2006: Townsville Crocodiles
- 2008–2010: Melbourne Tigers (assistant)
- 2019–2020: South East Melbourne Phoenix (assistant)

Career highlights
- As player: SEABL champion (1982); As coach: NBL champion (1992); 2× NBL Coach of the Year (2000, 2003)

Ian Stacker (born c. 1957) is an Australian former professional basketball player and coach. Listed by the NBL in 1983 as 181 cm and a guard, he had an eight-year playing career before becoming a successful coach in the National Basketball League (NBL), winning the NBL Coach of the Year in 2000 and 2003 with the Townsville Crocodiles.

== Early life ==
Stacker grew up in the Melbourne suburb of Nunawading. He represented the Nunawading Spectres and Melbourne Tigers in the Victorian Basketball Association as a junior, winning one Under 14 and two Under 20 state titles. He also played for Victorian state teams at Under 12, Under 14 and Under 16 levels.

== Playing career ==
After playing for the Melbourne Tigers in the pre-SEABL competition in 1979 and 1980, Stacker joined the Frankston Bears for the SEABL's inaugural season in 1981. The Bears won the SEABL championship in 1982, which saw them promoted to the National Basketball League (NBL) for the 1983 season. Stacker made his NBL debut with the Bears in 1983 and then joined the Nunawading Spectres for the 1984 NBL season. He continued with the Spectres in the NBL in 1985 and 1986 before returning to the SEABL in 1987 to play for the Dandenong Rangers.

== Coaching career ==
In 1988, Stacker returned to the NBL and the Nunawading Spectres, now known as the Eastside Spectres, as an assistant coach. After four years as an assistant with the Spectres, he joined the South East Melbourne Magic as an assistant in 1992. The Magic won the NBL championship in 1992. He continued on as a Magic assistant until 1995, when in 1996 he served as head coach of the Geelong Supercats.

After a season as an assistant coach with the North Melbourne Giants in 1998, Stacker was appointed head coach of the Townsville Crocodiles for the 1998–99 NBL season. He was named NBL Coach of the Year in 2000 and 2003 and guided the Crocodiles to the NBL Grand Final in 2001. He parted ways with the Crocodiles following the 2005–06 season after eight seasons as head coach.

Stacker served as an assistant coach in 2008–09 and 2009–10 with the Melbourne Tigers.

In July 2010, Stacker was appointed head coach of the Australian Institute of Sport (AIS) men's basketball program. He led the program until 2013.

In February 2019, Stacker was appointed an assistant coach of the South East Melbourne Phoenix for their inaugural season in the NBL in 2019–20. He parted ways with the Phoenix in March 2020.

== National team career ==
In 1997, Stacker was head coach of the Australian Under 23 team that won a gold medal at the World Championships. The gold medal was the first won by an Australian men's team in international competition, and included consecutive victories over United states (quarter final), Argentina (semi final), and the previously undefeated Puerto Rico (gold medal game). In 2001, he coached Australia at the FIBA Under-21 World Championship.

Stacker was set to coach Australia at the 2013 Summer Universiade in Russia, but he stepped down from the role for personal reasons.

== Personal life ==
Stacker and his wife had three sons before their divorce. His eldest son, Jackson, died in 2021. As of September 2022, the death remained a mystery.
