= Lindsay Gaze =

Australian basketball player & coach, born 1936

Personal information
- Born: 16 August 1936 (age 90) Adelaide, South Australia, Australia
- Listed height: 184 cm (6 ft 0 in)
- Listed weight: 76 kg (168 lb)

Career information
- Playing career: 1958–1970
- Position: Shooting guard
- Coaching career: 1970–2005

Career highlights
- As head coach: 2× NBL champion (1993, 1997); 3× NBL Coach of the Year (1989, 1997, 1999); Australian Basketball Hall of Fame (2004)
- Basketball Hall of Fame
- FIBA Hall of Fame

Lindsay John Casson Gaze OAM (born 16 August 1936) is an Australian former basketball player and coach.

He played for Australia in three Summer Olympics qualification tournaments, between 1960 and 1968, and was the head coach of the senior Australian basketball team at four Summer Olympics, between 1972 and 1984. Gaze also coached the Melbourne Tigers for 35 years, including 22 seasons in the National Basketball League (NBL), winning two league championships, in 1993 and 1997.

Gaze was the NBL Coach of the Year in 1989, 1997 and 1999, and is second all-time in the number of coaching wins in that league. Gaze is a member of the Australian Basketball Hall of Fame, as both a player and coach, and is an associate member of the Sport Australia Hall of Fame. He has also been inducted into both the FIBA Hall of Fame and the Naismith Memorial Basketball Hall of Fame, as a coach.

== Personal life ==
Gaze is the son of Albert J. Gaze and Avis M. Gaze. He has two older brothers, Barry and Tony, who is a former coach of the Australian national women's basketball team, the Opals. He married Margaret in 1962, with the couple having a daughter, Janet Gaze-Daniels (born 8 July 1964), who works in recreation management, and a son, Australian basketball player Andrew Gaze (born 24 July 1965). As the GM of the Victorian Basketball Association (until his retirement), the Gaze family lived in the official GM's residence, which was attached to the back of the Albert Park Basketball Stadium. Gaze's nephew, Mark Gaze (Tony's son), played for Australia, under Lindsay's coaching, at the 1982 FIBA World Championship and went on to play in 182 NBL, games from 1983 to 1991. He is also the great-uncle of Mark Gaze's daughter, Kate Gaze, who played for the Canberra Capitals, in Australia's Women's National Basketball League.

Lindsay Gaze and his brothers were raised by his mother, after his parents separated soon after moving from Adelaide to Melbourne, in the early 1940s. As a youth, he played tennis, basketball and Australian rules football and was his school captain in tennis and football. Lindsay and Barry Gaze played in the Victorian Football Association for Prahran, and they were both selected as members of an Australian rules team that played an exhibition match during the 1956 Melbourne Summer Olympics, although Lindsay didn't take the field.

== Olympic career ==
It was in basketball that Gaze would make his mark in the Summer Olympic Games. In 1958, he chose to pursue a career in basketball, rather than football (and a promising engineering career) and although still playing, became the first full-time basketball administrator of the Victorian Basketball Association, accepting the position of General Manager. Lindsay Gaze held the position until his retirement in 2005, during which time the number of registered players in Victoria rose from around 2,000 in 1958 to over 200,000.

He was selected for the senior Australian basketball team for the 1960 Bologna Pre-Olympic Tournament, which was the first Australian basketball team to travel overseas to compete for a place at the Summer Olympics. Gaze soon established himself as one of Australia's leading basketball players, establishing an international reputation, when he was selected as a member of the All-Star Five at the 1962 Philippines Invitational Basketball Tournament.

Gaze represented Australia during the 1960 Bologna, 1964 Yokohama, and 1968 Monterrey Summer Olympics world qualification tournaments, but Australia only qualified to compete at the 1964 Games. He developed a reputation as a fanatical trainer, training two or three times a week with his club and at home. Gaze also coached the Australian national under-16 and under-18 squads, during his playing career.

His reputation for training led to his appointment as a coach of the Melbourne Tigers (MBA) in 1970, and also of the senior men's Australian basketball side in 1971, which he went on to coach at four Summer Olympic Games, in 1972, 1976, 1980 and 1984. His son, Andrew, was a part of the team that he coached in 1984. Lindsay Gaze would write his first book, Better Basketball, in 1977.

Lindsay was a part of every Australian Boomers' Olympics team as a player or coach, from 1960 to 1984. He covered each of the campaigns, year by year, on the Aussie Hoopla podcast.

== NBL coaching career 1983–2005 ==
Gaze was the inaugural head coach of the Melbourne Tigers, at the start of the NBL, in 1984. He retired in May 2005, after coaching the team for 22 seasons. He coached in a total of 651 games, and recorded 339 victories. The Melbourne Tigers won two NBL championships, in 1993 and 1997, with Gaze as the club's head coach. He was a widely respected coach in the NBL, winning the league's Coach of the Year award three times during his career. He announced his retirement from coaching basketball, on the same day that his son, Andrew Gaze, announced his retirement from playing basketball, after having played in 612 NBL games. Lindsay Gaze had coached Andrew Gaze during his son's entire career as an NBL player, with the pair forming the longest standing father-son partnership in the history of world sport. The pair would also author a book titled, Winning Basketball, in 1992.

Lindsay Gaze was also a member of the NBL Board. In 2004, he became a part owner of the Melbourne Tigers, along with Andrew Gaze. At his retirement, journalist Stephen Howell of the Melbourne Age, wrote that history would judge him as, the most influential figure in Australian basketball.

== CBA coaching career ==
Gaze was announced as the head coach of the Tianjin Ronggang, of the Chinese CBA, for the 2008–09 season.

== Awards and accolades ==
- Played at the 1960, 1964 and 1968 editions of the FIBA World Olympic Qualifying Tournament.
- Played at the 1964 Summer Olympics and the 1970 FIBA World Championship.
- Head Coach of the Australian national team at the 1972, 1976, 1980 and 1984 editions of the Summer Olympic Games.
- Head Coach of the Australian national team at the 1974, 1978, 1982 and 1994 editions of the FIBA World Cup.
- Coached in 689 NBL games, with 363 victories (52.6%).
- NBL champion (head coach) – 1993 and 1997.
- NBL Coach of the Year – 1989, 1997, 1999.
- Australian Basketball Hall of Fame inductee, as player and coach – 2004.
- Associate member of the Sport Australia Hall of Fame (SAHOF), for role as a coach and member of the SAHOF board.
- Victorian Father of the Year 1992 (his son, Andrew Gaze, would also win the award in 2004).
- FIBA Hall of Fame inductee as a coach – 2010.
- Naismith Memorial Basketball Hall of Fame inductee as a coach – 2015 (formal induction on 11 September).
- Medal of the Order of Australia (OAM), in the 1985 Australia Day Honours, for "service to the sport of basketball".
- Lindsay and his son, Andrew, are the only Australians that are currently in the FIBA Hall of Fame. Andrew was inducted as a player in 2013.

== See also ==
- Australian football at the 1956 Summer Olympics

== Sources ==
- Who's Who in Australia 2005, Crown Content North Melbourne 2005, page 789
- NBL Lindsay Gaze page
- "Memorable Gaze into the past". The Age. 13 May 2005.
- Sportal article on retirement of Lindsay and Andrew Gaze
- Basketball Highway article on history of Australian basketball
- 1996 ABC Australia page featuring Lindsay and Andrew Gaze
