= Brian Kerle =

Australian basketball coach and former player

Personal information
- Born: 29 August 1945 (age 81) Auchenflower, Queensland, Australia
- Listed height: 6 ft 7 in (2.01 m)

Career history

Playing
- 1967–1978: St. Kilda

Coaching
- 1977–1983: St. Kilda
- 1984–1992: Brisbane Bullets
- 1998–2000: Brisbane Bullets

Career highlights
- As player: 2× Australian Club Champion (1972, 1975); As coach: 4x NBL champion (1979, 1980, 1985, 1987); 2x NBL Coach of the Year (1984, 1990); NBL Hall of Fame (2006)

Brian Edward Kerle (born 29 August 1945) is an Australian former basketball player and coach. He competed in the men's tournament at the 1972 Summer Olympics. As a coach, he led St. Kilda and the Brisbane Bullets to two championships each in the National Basketball League (NBL). In 2006, Kerle was inducted into the NBL Hall of Fame (now part of the Australian Basketball Hall of Fame).

== Playing career ==
=== Club career ===
A relatively late starter to basketball, Kerle began playing with Oxley in the lower levels of Brisbane basketball in 1965. He later moved to Lang Park in the A grade.

Kerle was recruited to the St. Kilda Basketball Club from Brisbane in 1967.

=== International career ===
His first tournament for Australia was the 1970 FIBA World Championship in Yugoslavia.

Kerle was selected for the 1972 Summer Olympics.

Kerle played in the 1974 FIBA World Championship in Puerto Rico.

== Coaching career ==
Kerle took charge of St. Kilda in 1977 while they were still in the Victorian league. He continued as coach as the team entered the NBL. He led St. Kilda to back-to-back championships in 1979 and 1980. In 1981, despite finishing top of the table during the regular season, St. Kilda was forced to withdraw from the NBL finals after accepting an invitation to play at the 1981 FIBA Club World Cup. In São Paulo, St. Kilda finished eighth out of nine teams.

Kerle was sacked by St. Kilda in 1983, having been involved with the club for 16 years.

In 1984, Kerle joined the Brisbane Bullets. Kerle was sacked after the 1992 season. He returned to the Bullets in 1998.

He is a four-time championship-winning coach in the National Basketball League (NBL).

== Honours ==
National

- Two-time Australian Club Champion – 1972, 1975

NBL

- Four-time NBL champion – 1979, 1980, 1985, 1987
- Two-time NBL Coach of the Year – 1984, 1990

Halls of fame

- Basketball Victoria Wall of Fame – 1990
- NBL Hall of Fame – 2006
- QSport Hall of Fame – 2009
- Queensland Basketball Hall of Fame – 2018

Personal

- Australian Sports Medal: 2000
