= Liberty High School (Liberty, New York) =

Location
- 125 Buckley Street; Liberty, New York; United States; 41°48′24″N 74°45′12″W

Information
- Type: Public
- School district: Liberty Central School District
- NCES School ID: 361722001539
- Principal: Stephen Matuszak
- Teaching staff: 46.22 (on FTE basis)
- Grades: 9–12
- Enrollment: 588 (2023–2024)
- Student to teacher ratio: 12.72
- Colors: red, white
- Mascot: Redhawk
- Website: LHS homepage

Liberty High School is a public high school based in Liberty, New York.

Its school gymnasium is most famous for hosting an episode of WWF Monday Night Raw in 1994.

In October of 2023, Liberty Central School District revealed the new logos and new school mascot of "Redhawks". The school was once the "Indians" but they changed it in compliance with New York State Law.
