= Reg Biddings =

American basketball player

Personal information
- Born: c. 1958 U.S.
- Died: July 18, 2017 (aged 59) Queensland, Australia
- Listed height: 6 ft 7 in (2.01 m)

Career information
- High school: Liberty (Liberty, New York)
- College: SUNY Oneonta (1976–1977); SUNY Orange (1977–1978); USAO (1979–1981)
- Playing career: 1981–1985
- Position: Forward
- Coaching career: 1981–1981

Career history

Playing
- 1981: Forestville Eagles
- 1982: Adelaide City Eagles
- 1983: St. Kilda Saints
- 1984–1985: Broadmeadows Broncos

Coaching
- 1981: Forestville Eagles

Career highlights
- NBL scoring champion (1982)

Reginald Leonardo Biddings (c. 1958 – July 18, 2017) was an American professional basketball player who spent his career in the Australian National Basketball League (NBL) and South East Basketball League (SEBL). Biddings holds the NBL record for most points scored in a 40-minute game with 63 points.

== Early life and college career ==
Biddings grew up in the Catskill Mountains in New York. He attended Liberty High School in Liberty, New York, and scored 1,134 points while playing for its basketball team.

Biddings played college basketball for SUNY Oneonta during the 1976–77 season. He was selected to the NJCAA All-American Second Team while playing at SUNY Orange during the 1977–78 season. Biddings played for the University of Science and Arts of Oklahoma (USAO) during the 1979–80 season.

== Professional career ==
Biddings toured Australia with the USAO in 1980. He dropped out of university in 1981 and returned to Australia, where he settled in Adelaide, South Australia, and soon signed with the Forestville Eagles of the NBL. Biddings scored 63 points in a 98–90 win against the Bankstown Bruins in 1981 that still remains as the most points scored by an NBL player during a 40-minute game. (Note: Al Green of the West Adelaide Bearcats holds the record for most points in a 48-minute NBL game with 71.) He was appointed as the team's player-coach during the season. Biddings finished third in voting for the NBL Most Valuable Player Award in 1981.

He moved to the Adelaide City Eagles for their inaugural NBL season in 1982 and led the league in scoring with 30.1 points per game. Biddings joined the St. Kilda Saints during the 1983 season but his defensive liabilities led to him not being resigned. He moved to the SEBL to join the Broadmeadows Broncos and averaged 43 points per game during the 1984 season. Biddings was recruited by the Perth Wildcats to return to the NBL in 1985 but the arrangement failed and he stayed in the SEBL.

== Post-playing career ==
Biddings moved to Mackay, Queensland, after his playing career and became known throughout the region for his CarBq – a car converted into a portable barbeque that was used to help raise funds for his charitable causes. He owned clothing shops, marketing firms and nightclubs. Biddings unsuccessfully applied to introduce a new team, the Gold Coast Honeys, into the Women's National Basketball League in 2008.

== Personal life ==
Biddings' daughter, Carla Dziwoki, played netball in the ANZ Championship. He married Alison Mitchell in 2015.

=== Death ===
Biddings died of colon cancer on July 18, 2017, aged 59. He lived in Moranbah, Queensland, with his wife at the time of his death. Biddings' farewell service was held at the Carrara Stadium basketball courts.
