= Darryl McDonald =

American-Australian basketball player

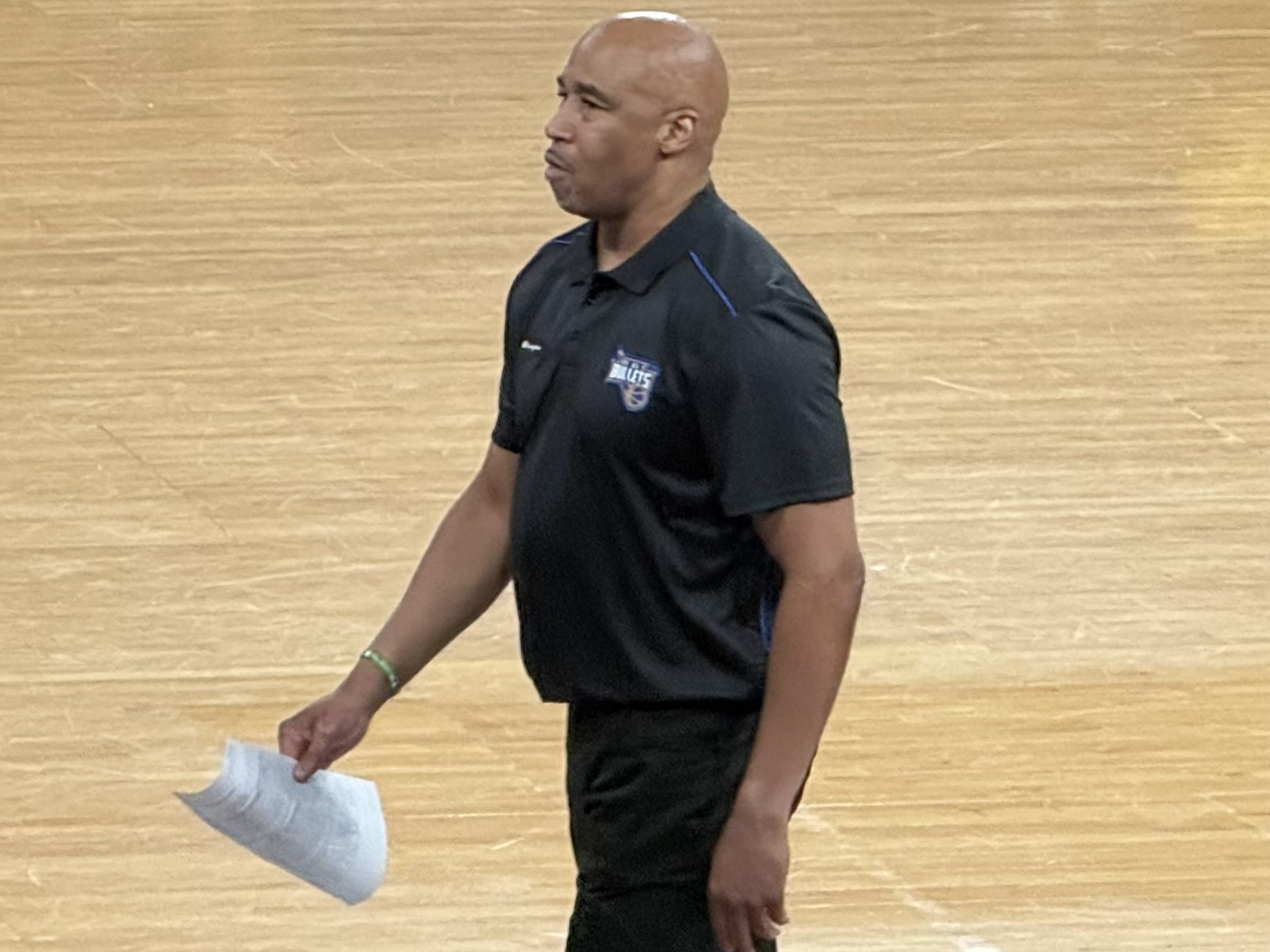
- McDonald with the Brisbane Bullets in 2026

Personal information
- Born: 17 June 1964 (age 62) Harlem, New York, U.S.
- Listed height: 192 cm (6 ft 4 in)
- Listed weight: 89 kg (196 lb)

Career information
- College: Westchester CC (1984–1986); Texas A&M (1986–1988)
- NBA draft: 1988: undrafted
- Playing career: 1990–2008
- Position: Point guard
- Coaching career: 2007–present

Career history

Playing
- 1990–1991: Oklahoma City Cavalry
- 1991–1994: Sioux Falls Skyforce
- 1994–1998: North Melbourne Giants
- 1999–2003: Victoria Titans / Giants
- 2003–2008: Melbourne Tigers

Coaching
- 2008–2009: Melbourne Tigers (assistant)
- 2010–2011: Melbourne Tigers (interim)
- 2012–2014: Melbourne Tigers / United (assistant)
- 2014–2015: Melbourne United (interim)
- 2020–2023: Melbourne United (assistant)
- 2023–2025: Brisbane Bullets (assistant)
- 2024–2026: Northside Wizards
- 2025–2026: Brisbane Bullets (interim)

Career highlights
- As player: 3× NBL champion (1994, 2006, 2008); 2× NBL All-Star Game MVP (1996, 2006); 3× All-NBL First Team (1994–1996); All-NBL Second Team (2006); 4× All-NBL Third Team (2000–2002, 2007); NBL Best Sixth Man (2004); 3× NBL Good Hands Award (1994–1997); 8× NBL leader in steals (1994–1997, 1999–2001, 2003); CBA All-Defensive Team (1992); As assistant coach: NBL champion (2021)

Darryl Keith McDonald (born 17 June 1964) is an American-Australian professional basketball coach and former player who most recent served as the interim head coach of the Brisbane Bullets of the Australian National Basketball League (NBL). Nicknamed "D-Mac", he played college basketball for the Texas A&M Aggies. He played in the NBL for the North Melbourne Giants, Victoria Titans / Giants and the Melbourne Tigers.

McDonald was a three-time NBL champion: winning with the Giants in 1994, and twice with the Tigers in 2006 and 2008. He was selected as the Most Valuable Player (MVP) of the NBL All-Star Game in 1996 and 2006. McDonald served as the interim coach for the Melbourne Tigers during the 2011–12 season and returned in the same capacity with the renamed Melbourne United for the 2014–15 season.

== Early life ==
Born in New York City and growing up on the streets of Harlem, Manhattan, McDonald learned to play basketball on the tough New York playground courts such as the famous Rucker Park. Known as "Mr. Excitement" and "D-Mac: The Playground King.", he battled against New York playground legends such as The Terminator, Master Rob and Pookie Wilson as well as future NBA stars Rod Strickland and Mario 'The Jedi' Elie.

== College career ==
McDonald played basketball for Westchester Community College after his graduation from high school. After hearing about the young point guard, Texas A&M coach Shelby Metcalf travelled to Harlem in 1985 to see McDonald play on the playgrounds. Thoroughly impressed, Metcalf began recruiting McDonald to come to Texas and play for the Aggies. Fortunately for Metcalf, McDonald had already decided to leave New York. His neighbourhood in Harlem was very dangerous, and McDonald's brother had in fact been shot and killed by robbers in early 1985. After agreeing to attend Texas A&M, McDonald spent the first few days of his stay in College Station in his dorm room, convinced that the number of gun racks he saw on pick-up trucks throughout town meant the area was as dangerous as the place he had left.

His early years in Texas were frustrating as Metcalf tried to change's McDonald's style of play. McDonald was a "creative and flashy" player who liked playing to the crowd. With superb instincts, McDonald had a knack for stealing the ball but had difficulty playing straight-up defence. Metcalf finally agreed to allow McDonald to play as he saw fit, with good results. In 1987, McDonald led the Aggies to the Southwest Conference Tournament Championship, despite the fact that the Aggies entered the tournament as the No. 8 seed after losing nine of their last eleven conference games. For his performance, McDonald was named the tournament MVP. Their victory earned the team an automatic bid to the 1987 NCAA Tournament, Metcalf's final tournament appearance, and the last for the Aggies until 2006. The Aggies played a tough game against Duke but ultimately lost their first-round game, exiting the tournament.

== Professional playing career ==
After graduating from Texas A&M, McDonald spent several years playing in the relative obscurity of the Canadian NBL, where he was named an All-Star in 1993 while playing to Cape Breton, and the Continental Basketball Association (CBA) where he played for the Oklahoma City Cavalry and the Sioux Falls Skyforce. He was selected to the CBA All-Defensive Team in 1992.

In McDonald's first year in the league in 1994, he led the Giants to the NBL championship with a 2–0 Grand Final series win over the Adelaide 36ers, including hitting the game winning shot in overtime in Game 1 of the series at the Clipsal Powerhouse in Adelaide to give the Giants a 95–93 win. D-Mac was also named the runner-up in the NBL Most Valuable Player voting and the runner-up for the NBL's Best Defensive Player Award. For each of his first three years (1994–1997), McDonald led the league in assists and steals, winning the NBL Good Hands Award each year, and was again named runner-up NBL Most Value Player in 1997. From 1995 to 1997 he played in the NBL All Star-Game, becoming the MVP of the 1996 game. McDonald was named to the All-NBL First Team from 1994 to 1996 and to the All-NBL Second team in 1997.

McDonald continued to remain with his team when they merged into the Victoria Titans in 1998–99 under coach Brian Goorjian, and then becoming a member of the Victoria Giants after the Titans folded following the 2001–02 NBL season. Despite finishing second in the NBL in assists in 2001–02 and 2002–03, and being the NBL leader in steals in 2000–01 and 2002–03, McDonald was sacked by the Giants after the 2003 season as they decided to move in a younger direction.

The Melbourne Tigers quickly picked him up, and he served as a backup to Andrew Gaze and Lanard Copeland for two seasons, earning NBL Best Sixth Man honours in 2004. The 2005–06 season saw McDonald return to the starting line-up, and his play saw many sporting commentators wonder how his 42-year-old body was able to sustain his elite level of play and athleticism. McDonald helped lead the Tigers to the 2006 championship, outclassing many of his younger opponents along the way including starting Australian Boomers point guard CJ Bruton. He was named among the finalist for the NBL's 25th Anniversary Team, finishing 17th in the final voting, and was named to the 2006 NBL Aussie All-Star Team, where he was named the MVP.

McDonald signed a contract extension to lead the Tigers past his 44th birthday. His contract also gives him the opportunity to coach a Melbourne Tigers developmental team in the off-season. Despite his age, he was still one of the quickest and most explosive players in the NBL, but rarely played a full game due to his age and limited stamina. He retired after Game 5 of the 2007–08 Grand Final series win over the Brian Goorjian coached Sydney Kings.

== Coaching career ==
From 2007 onwards McDonald has served as the coach of the Wesley College Firsts boys' basketball team.

McDonald served as the head coach of the Melbourne Tigers during the 2010–11 season when Al Westover was sacked. After starting the 2014–15 season as an assistant coach with the renamed Melbourne United, he was again elevated to the role of head coach when Chris Anstey stood down following the team's first game.

On 23 December 2020, McDonald joined Melbourne United as an assistant coach for the 2020–21 NBL season.

On 23 February 2023, after three seasons at United, McDonald joined the Brisbane Bullets as an assistant coach for the 2023–24 NBL season. Following the NBL season, he joined the Northside Wizards of the NBL1 North as head coach of the men's team for the 2024 NBL1 season. Following the 2024–25 NBL season, McDonald was retained as assistant coach of the Bullets to accompany new head coach, Stu Lash, re-signing for another two seasons on 5 June 2025. On December 18, 2025, McDonald was elevated to interim head coach of the Bullets after Lash stepped down. An injury-riddled second half of the season saw the Bullets finish with a 12-game losing streak. McDonald parted ways with the Bullets following the 2025–26 season. Following the 2026 NBL1 North season, McDonald parted ways with the Northside Wizards after three seasons as head coach.

== Personal life ==
McDonald has dual American/Australian citizenship. He has seven children. His second oldest son, Derrick, joined the Tigers' roster as a development player in the 2006–07 season.

McDonald once appeared on Judge Judy to debate a custody hearing for one of his children. The case was held shortly after his season finished in Australia, with McDonald just making it to the trial.
