= Whitlam Leisure Centre =

Indoor arena in Sydney, New South Wales

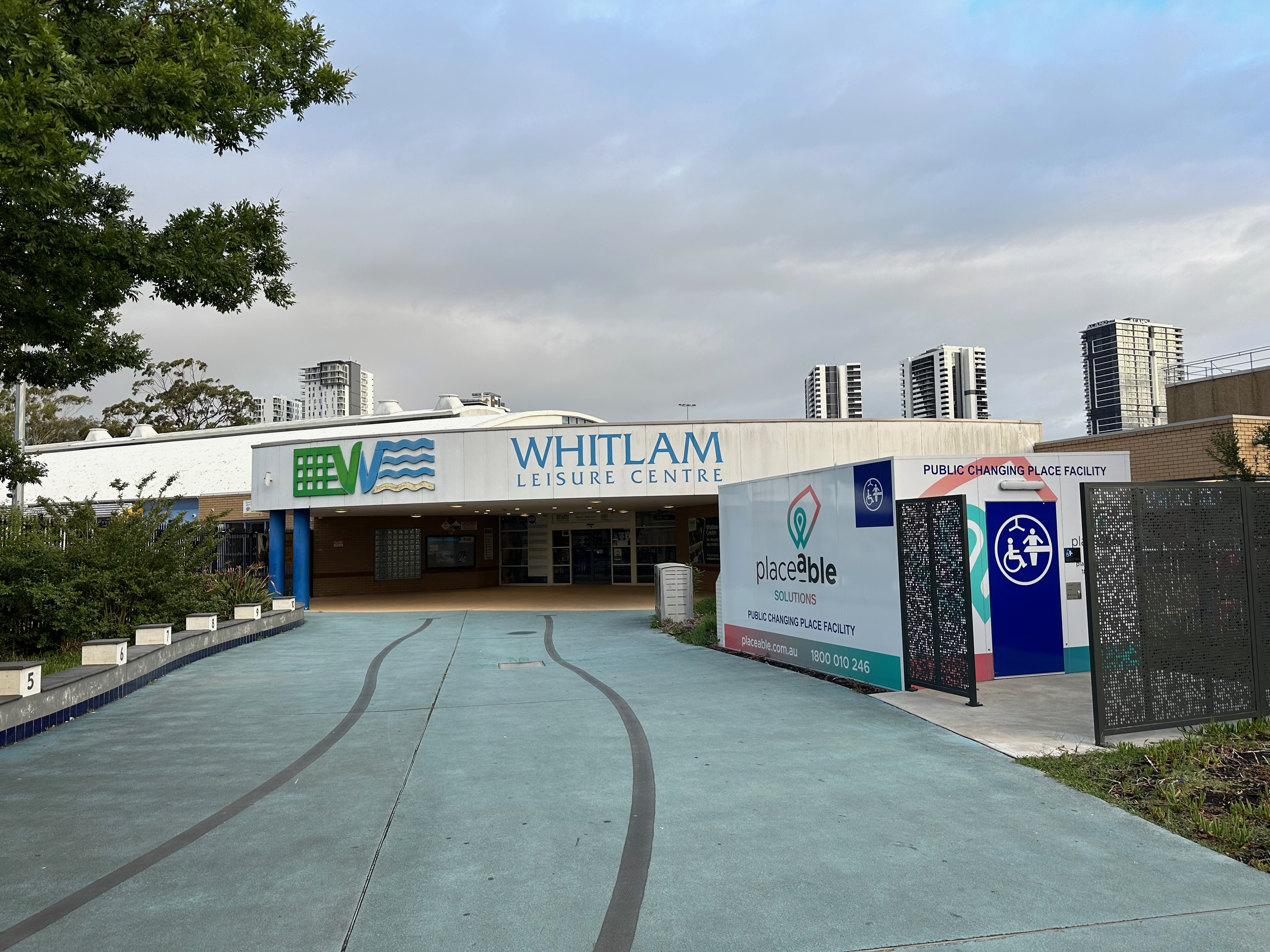
- Interactive map of Whitlam Leisure Centre
- Location: Liverpool, New South Wales, Australia
- Coordinates: 33°55′31″S 150°54′54″E
- Capacity: 2,500

Construction
- Opened: 1994

Tenant
- West Sydney Razorbacks (NBL) (1998–2000)

Website
- Whitlam Leisure Centre

The Whitlam Leisure Centre is a multi-use indoor arena in western Sydney, New South Wales, Australia. It was the first home of the former NBL team West Sydney Razorbacks.

== Facilities ==
The site includes a full sized 50 metre swimming pool, a heated indoor 25 metre pool and several small wading and family pools. There is a full sized gym facility, the indoor stadium facility with a basketball court floor, and a variety of classes and programs. Short term child care is provided for a fee.

== Wheelchair rugby league ==
In November 2008, it was the venue for the semi-finals of the 2008 Wheelchair Rugby League World Cup. In 2019, it hosted the first match in the Ashes Test series between Australia and England. The centre has also been used for interstate matches between Queensland and New South Wales. In January 2022, it was the venue for the postponed 2021 State of Origin match and it hosted the State Challenge matches in 2023 and 2025.

=== International results ===
Date		Result		Event	Refs
12 November 2008	England	66–0	Barbarians	2008 World Cup	
12 November 2008	France	20–22	Australia	2008 World Cup	
21 October 2019	Australia	28–84	England	Ashes Test series	
