= 1998–99 NBL season =

Professional basketball season

- League: National Basketball League
- Season: 1998–99
- Dates: 9 October 1998 – 23 April 1999
- Teams: 11
- TV partners: Australia: ABC; Fox Sports

Regular season
- Season champions: Adelaide 36ers
- Season MVP: (United States) Steve Woodberry (Brisbane)

Finals
- Champions: Adelaide 36ers (3rd title)
- Runners-up: Victoria Titans
- Semifinalists: Melbourne Tigers; Wollongong Hawks
- Finals MVP: (Australia) Brett Maher (Adelaide)

Statistical leaders
Points	(Australia) Andrew Gaze (Melbourne)	31.8
Rebounds	(Australia) Mark Bradtke (Melbourne)	13.3
Assists	(Australia) Darryl McDonald (Victoria)	8.2

NBL seasons
- ← 1998 1999–2000 →

The 1998–99 NBL season was the 21st season of competition since its establishment in 1979. A total of 11 teams contested the league. This season marked the first summer season for the NBL. The Townsville Suns were renamed the Townsville Crocodiles.

== Regular season ==
The 1998–99 regular season took place over 23 rounds between 9 October 1998 and 14 March 1999.

=== Round 1 ===
Date	Home	Score	Away	Venue	Crowd	Boxscore
9/10/1998	Wollongong Hawks	76–100	Newcastle Falcons	WIN Entertainment Centre	N/A	boxscore
9/10/1998	Brisbane Bullets	110–78	Canberra Cannons	Brisbane Convention & Exhibition Centre	N/A	boxscore
10/10/1998	Melbourne Tigers	99–80	Victoria Titans	Melbourne Park	N/A	boxscore
10/10/1998	Perth Wildcats	106–96	Adelaide 36ers	Perth Entertainment Centre	N/A	boxscore
10/10/1998	Townsville Crocodiles	91–84	Brisbane Bullets	Townsville Entertainment Centre	N/A	boxscore
10/10/1998	Sydney Kings	97–103	West Sydney Razorbacks	Sydney Entertainment Centre	N/A	boxscore

=== Round 2 ===
Date	Home	Score	Away	Venue	Crowd	Boxscore
16/10/1998	Perth Wildcats	70–75	Sydney Kings	Perth Entertainment Centre	N/A	boxscore
16/10/1998	Melbourne Tigers	109–101	Brisbane Bullets	Melbourne Park	N/A	boxscore
16/10/1998	Canberra Cannons	89–104	West Sydney Razorbacks	AIS Arena	N/A	boxscore
17/10/1998	Victoria Titans	110–94	Canberra Cannons	Melbourne Park	N/A	boxscore
17/10/1998	Townsville Crocodiles	86–99	Wollongong Hawks	Townsville Entertainment Centre	N/A	boxscore
17/10/1998	Newcastle Falcons	89–87	West Sydney Razorbacks	Newcastle Entertainment Centre	N/A	boxscore

=== Round 3 ===
Date	Home	Score	Away	Venue	Crowd	Boxscore
23/10/1998	Canberra Cannons	98–109	Melbourne Tigers	AIS Arena	N/A	boxscore
24/10/1998	Adelaide 36ers	94–89	Townsville Crocodiles	Adelaide Arena	N/A	boxscore
24/10/1998	Wollongong Hawks	83–80	Perth Wildcats	WIN Entertainment Centre	N/A	boxscore
24/10/1998	Newcastle Falcons	100–84	Sydney Kings	Newcastle Entertainment Centre	N/A	boxscore

=== Round 4 ===
Date	Home	Score	Away	Venue	Crowd	Boxscore
30/10/1998	Perth Wildcats	96–111	Melbourne Tigers	Perth Entertainment Centre	N/A	boxscore
30/10/1998	Newcastle Falcons	95–98	Canberra Cannons	Newcastle Entertainment Centre	N/A	boxscore
31/10/1998	Adelaide 36ers	109–72	Wollongong Hawks	Adelaide Arena	N/A	boxscore
31/10/1998	Brisbane Bullets	95–80	West Sydney Razorbacks	Brisbane Convention & Exhibition Centre	N/A	boxscore
31/10/1998	Sydney Kings	92–101	Victoria Titans	Sydney Entertainment Centre	N/A	boxscore

=== Round 5 ===
Date	Home	Score	Away	Venue	Crowd	Boxscore
6/11/1998	Adelaide 36ers	95–112	West Sydney Razorbacks	Adelaide Arena	N/A	boxscore
6/11/1998	Brisbane Bullets	84–101	Newcastle Falcons	Brisbane Convention & Exhibition Centre	N/A	boxscore
7/11/1998	Victoria Titans	100–111	Wollongong Hawks	Melbourne Park	N/A	boxscore
7/11/1998	Perth Wildcats	95–98	West Sydney Razorbacks	Perth Entertainment Centre	N/A	boxscore
7/11/1998	Canberra Cannons	111–88	Sydney Kings	AIS Arena	N/A	boxscore
7/11/1998	Townsville Crocodiles	96–102	Newcastle Falcons	Townsville Entertainment Centre	N/A	boxscore
8/11/1998	Melbourne Tigers	112–105	Adelaide 36ers	Melbourne Park	N/A	boxscore

=== Round 6 ===
Date	Home	Score	Away	Venue	Crowd	Boxscore
13/11/1998	Victoria Titans	97–83	Newcastle Falcons	Melbourne Park	N/A	boxscore
13/11/1998	Wollongong Hawks	100–91	West Sydney Razorbacks	WIN Entertainment Centre	N/A	boxscore
14/11/1998	Canberra Cannons	99–94	Townsville Crocodiles	AIS Arena	N/A	boxscore
14/11/1998	Sydney Kings	102–107	Melbourne Tigers	Sydney Entertainment Centre	N/A	boxscore
15/11/1998	Perth Wildcats	77–97	Brisbane Bullets	Perth Entertainment Centre	N/A	boxscore

=== Round 7 ===
Date	Home	Score	Away	Venue	Crowd	Boxscore
20/11/1998	Melbourne Tigers	102–87	Townsville Crocodiles	Melbourne Park	N/A	boxscore
20/11/1998	West Sydney Razorbacks	81–92	Victoria Titans	Whitlam Centre	N/A	boxscore
20/11/1998	Canberra Cannons	122–106	Newcastle Falcons	AIS Arena	N/A	boxscore
21/11/1998	Adelaide 36ers	96–112	Brisbane Bullets	Adelaide Arena	N/A	boxscore
21/11/1998	Wollongong Hawks	88–86	Townsville Crocodiles	WIN Entertainment Centre	N/A	boxscore
21/11/1998	Newcastle Falcons	96–97	Melbourne Tigers	Newcastle Entertainment Centre	N/A	boxscore

=== Round 8 ===
Date	Home	Score	Away	Venue	Crowd	Boxscore
27/11/1998	Melbourne Tigers	102–97	Sydney Kings	Melbourne Park	N/A	boxscore
27/11/1998	Canberra Cannons	99–101	Perth Wildcats	AIS Arena	N/A	boxscore
27/11/1998	Townsville Crocodiles	93–80	Wollongong Hawks	Townsville Entertainment Centre	N/A	boxscore
28/11/1998	Victoria Titans	86–83	Perth Wildcats	Melbourne Park	N/A	boxscore
28/11/1998	Newcastle Falcons	84–94	Adelaide 36ers	Newcastle Entertainment Centre	N/A	boxscore

=== Round 9 ===
Date	Home	Score	Away	Venue	Crowd	Boxscore
4/12/1998	Victoria Titans	101–73	West Sydney Razorbacks	Melbourne Park	N/A	boxscore
4/12/1998	Adelaide 36ers	101–90	Sydney Kings	Adelaide Arena	N/A	boxscore
4/12/1998	Townsville Crocodiles	120–107	Canberra Cannons	Townsville Entertainment Centre	N/A	boxscore
4/12/1998	Wollongong Hawks	83–86	Brisbane Bullets	WIN Entertainment Centre	N/A	boxscore
5/12/1998	Melbourne Tigers	109–90	West Sydney Razorbacks	Melbourne Park	N/A	boxscore
5/12/1998	Perth Wildcats	93–90	Adelaide 36ers	Perth Entertainment Centre	N/A	boxscore
5/12/1998	Newcastle Falcons	87–78	Victoria Titans	Newcastle Entertainment Centre	N/A	boxscore
5/12/1998	Sydney Kings	93–72	Wollongong Hawks	Sydney Entertainment Centre	N/A	boxscore
5/12/1998	Brisbane Bullets	105–97	Townsville Crocodiles	Brisbane Convention & Exhibition Centre	N/A	boxscore

=== Round 10 ===
Date	Home	Score	Away	Venue	Crowd	Boxscore
11/12/1998	Wollongong Hawks	97–108	Sydney Kings	WIN Entertainment Centre	N/A	boxscore
11/12/1998	West Sydney Razorbacks	107–87	Canberra Cannons	Whitlam Centre	N/A	boxscore
12/12/1998	Victoria Titans	92–80	Melbourne Tigers	Melbourne Park	N/A	boxscore
12/12/1998	Adelaide 36ers	111–98	Newcastle Falcons	Adelaide Arena	N/A	boxscore
12/12/1998	Brisbane Bullets	95–103	Sydney Kings	Brisbane Convention & Exhibition Centre	N/A	boxscore
12/12/1998	Townsville Crocodiles	96–110	Perth Wildcats	Townsville Entertainment Centre	N/A	boxscore

=== Round 11 ===
Date	Home	Score	Away	Venue	Crowd	Boxscore
16/12/1998	Sydney Kings	82–115	Adelaide 36ers	Sydney Entertainment Centre	N/A	boxscore
18/12/1998	Adelaide 36ers	105–92	Perth Wildcats	Adelaide Arena	N/A	boxscore
18/12/1998	Wollongong Hawks	86–60	West Sydney Razorbacks	WIN Entertainment Centre	N/A	boxscore
19/12/1998	Melbourne Tigers	99–110	Canberra Cannons	Melbourne Park	N/A	boxscore
19/12/1998	Brisbane Bullets	106–93	Perth Wildcats	Brisbane Convention & Exhibition Centre	N/A	boxscore
19/12/1998	West Sydney Razorbacks	91–107	Newcastle Falcons	Whitlam Centre	N/A	boxscore
20/12/1998	Victoria Titans	72–87	Townsville Crocodiles	Melbourne Park	N/A	boxscore

=== Round 12 ===
Date	Home	Score	Away	Venue	Crowd	Boxscore
26/12/1998	Victoria Titans	91–93	Adelaide 36ers	Melbourne Park	N/A	boxscore
26/12/1998	Sydney Kings	107–102	Newcastle Falcons	Sydney Entertainment Centre	N/A	boxscore
27/12/1998	Melbourne Tigers	102–91	Brisbane Bullets	Melbourne Park	N/A	boxscore
27/12/1998	Perth Wildcats	96–91	Townsville Crocodiles	Perth Entertainment Centre	N/A	boxscore
27/12/1998	Newcastle Falcons	83–93	Wollongong Hawks	Newcastle Entertainment Centre	N/A	boxscore
27/12/1998	West Sydney Razorbacks	101–94	Adelaide 36ers	Whitlam Centre	N/A	boxscore

=== Round 13 ===
Date	Home	Score	Away	Venue	Crowd	Boxscore
31/12/1998	Adelaide 36ers	104–90	Brisbane Bullets	Adelaide Arena	N/A	boxscore
31/12/1998	Wollongong Hawks	110–94	Melbourne Tigers	WIN Entertainment Centre	N/A	boxscore
31/12/1998	Townsville Crocodiles	74–65	Victoria Titans	Townsville Entertainment Centre	N/A	boxscore
1/01/1999	West Sydney Razorbacks	92–87	Melbourne Tigers	Whitlam Centre	N/A	boxscore
2/01/1999	Canberra Cannons	113–90	Sydney Kings	AIS Arena	N/A	boxscore
2/01/1999	Brisbane Bullets	82–99	Victoria Titans	Brisbane Convention & Exhibition Centre	N/A	boxscore
2/01/1999	Newcastle Falcons	77–105	Perth Wildcats	Newcastle Entertainment Centre	N/A	boxscore

=== Round 14 ===
Date	Home	Score	Away	Venue	Crowd	Boxscore
8/01/1999	Canberra Cannons	94–109	Perth Wildcats	AIS Arena	N/A	boxscore
8/01/1999	Townsville Crocodiles	116–68	Sydney Kings	Townsville Entertainment Centre	N/A	boxscore
9/01/1999	Wollongong Hawks	96–89	Adelaide 36ers	WIN Entertainment Centre	N/A	boxscore
9/01/1999	Newcastle Falcons	82–98	Brisbane Bullets	Newcastle Entertainment Centre	N/A	boxscore
9/01/1999	West Sydney Razorbacks	77–89	Victoria Titans	Whitlam Centre	N/A	boxscore

=== Round 15 ===
Date	Home	Score	Away	Venue	Crowd	Boxscore
15/01/1999	Wollongong Hawks	110–94	Newcastle Falcons	WIN Entertainment Centre	N/A	boxscore
15/01/1999	Townsville Crocodiles	90–89	Melbourne Tigers	Townsville Entertainment Centre	N/A	boxscore
15/01/1999	Sydney Kings	108–73	Canberra Cannons	Sydney Entertainment Centre	N/A	boxscore
16/01/1999	Perth Wildcats	84–85	Victoria Titans	Perth Entertainment Centre	N/A	boxscore
16/01/1999	Adelaide 36ers	105–87	Canberra Cannons	Adelaide Arena	N/A	boxscore
16/01/1999	Brisbane Bullets	104–118	Melbourne Tigers	Brisbane Convention & Exhibition Centre	N/A	boxscore
16/01/1999	West Sydney Razorbacks	78–72	Sydney Kings	Whitlam Centre	N/A	boxscore

=== Round 16 ===
Date	Home	Score	Away	Venue	Crowd	Boxscore
22/01/1999	West Sydney Razorbacks	79–92	Townsville Crocodiles	Whitlam Centre	N/A	boxscore
22/01/1999	Canberra Cannons	84–89	Wollongong Hawks	AIS Arena	N/A	boxscore
23/01/1999	Perth Wildcats	101–93	Melbourne Tigers	Perth Entertainment Centre	N/A	boxscore
23/01/1999	Adelaide 36ers	87–72	Wollongong Hawks	Adelaide Arena	N/A	boxscore
23/01/1999	Sydney Kings	98–109	Brisbane Bullets	Sydney Entertainment Centre	N/A	boxscore

=== Round 17 ===
Date	Home	Score	Away	Venue	Crowd	Boxscore
29/01/1999	Newcastle Falcons	77–97	Adelaide 36ers	Newcastle Entertainment Centre	N/A	boxscore
29/01/1999	Brisbane Bullets	86–85	Victoria Titans	Brisbane Convention & Exhibition Centre	N/A	boxscore
29/01/1999	West Sydney Razorbacks	102–97	Perth Wildcats	Whitlam Centre	N/A	boxscore
30/01/1999	Wollongong Hawks	84–77	Canberra Cannons	WIN Entertainment Centre	N/A	boxscore
30/01/1999	Townsville Crocodiles	96–71	Victoria Titans	Townsville Entertainment Centre	N/A	boxscore
30/01/1999	Sydney Kings	98–105	Melbourne Tigers	Sydney Entertainment Centre	N/A	boxscore

=== Round 18 ===
Date	Home	Score	Away	Venue	Crowd	Boxscore
5/02/1999	Canberra Cannons	88–99	Victoria Titans	AIS Arena	N/A	boxscore
5/02/1999	Newcastle Falcons	95–93	Brisbane Bullets	Newcastle Entertainment Centre	N/A	boxscore
5/02/1999	West Sydney Razorbacks	89–86	Townsville Crocodiles	Whitlam Centre	N/A	boxscore
6/02/1999	Melbourne Tigers	96–84	Wollongong Hawks	Melbourne Park	N/A	boxscore
6/02/1999	Sydney Kings	89–108	Perth Wildcats	Sydney Entertainment Centre	N/A	boxscore
6/02/1999	Adelaide 36ers	96–84	Townsville Crocodiles	Adelaide Arena	N/A	boxscore
7/02/1999	Victoria Titans	94–74	Perth Wildcats	Melbourne Park	N/A	boxscore

=== Round 19 ===
Date	Home	Score	Away	Venue	Crowd	Boxscore
12/02/1999	Perth Wildcats	116–93	Wollongong Hawks	Perth Entertainment Centre	N/A	boxscore
12/02/1999	Newcastle Falcons	100–109	Sydney Kings	Newcastle Entertainment Centre	N/A	boxscore
13/02/1999	Adelaide 36ers	89–70	Victoria Titans	Adelaide Arena	N/A	boxscore
13/02/1999	Canberra Cannons	106–93	Newcastle Falcons	AIS Arena	N/A	boxscore
13/02/1999	West Sydney Razorbacks	86–100	Brisbane Bullets	Whitlam Centre	N/A	boxscore

=== Round 20 ===
Date	Home	Score	Away	Venue	Crowd	Boxscore
19/02/1999	Melbourne Tigers	101–89	Newcastle Falcons	Melbourne Park	N/A	boxscore
19/02/1999	Wollongong Hawks	86–85	Victoria Titans	WIN Entertainment Centre	N/A	boxscore
19/02/1999	Brisbane Bullets	87–84	Townsville Crocodiles	Brisbane Convention & Exhibition Centre	N/A	boxscore
19/02/1999	Adelaide 36ers	96–89	Sydney Kings	Adelaide Arena	N/A	boxscore
20/02/1999	Victoria Titans	101–95	Brisbane Bullets	Melbourne Park	N/A	boxscore
20/02/1999	Townsville Crocodiles	85–83	Canberra Cannons	Townsville Entertainment Centre	N/A	boxscore
20/02/1999	West Sydney Razorbacks	104–88	Perth Wildcats	Whitlam Centre	N/A	boxscore
21/02/1999	Sydney Kings	68–95	Wollongong Hawks	Sydney Entertainment Centre	N/A	boxscore

=== Round 21 ===
Date	Home	Score	Away	Venue	Crowd	Boxscore
26/02/1999	Melbourne Tigers	106–94	West Sydney Razorbacks	Melbourne Park	N/A	boxscore
27/02/1999	Victoria Titans	98–87	Sydney Kings	Melbourne Park	N/A	boxscore
27/02/1999	Perth Wildcats	84–82	Canberra Cannons	Perth Entertainment Centre	N/A	boxscore
27/02/1999	Adelaide 36ers	87–90	Melbourne Tigers	Adelaide Arena	N/A	boxscore
27/02/1999	Brisbane Bullets	92–100	Wollongong Hawks	Brisbane Convention & Exhibition Centre	N/A	boxscore
27/02/1999	Newcastle Falcons	93–98	Townsville Crocodiles	Newcastle Entertainment Centre	N/A	boxscore

=== Round 22 ===
Date	Home	Score	Away	Venue	Crowd	Boxscore
4/03/1999	Townsville Crocodiles	118–113	West Sydney Razorbacks	Townsville Entertainment Centre	N/A	boxscore
5/03/1999	Victoria Titans	101–75	Newcastle Falcons	Melbourne Park	N/A	boxscore
5/03/1999	Perth Wildcats	105–84	Brisbane Bullets	Perth Entertainment Centre	N/A	boxscore
5/03/1999	Canberra Cannons	115–119	Adelaide 36ers	AIS Arena	N/A	boxscore
6/03/1999	Melbourne Tigers	86–92	Canberra Cannons	Melbourne Park	N/A	boxscore
6/03/1999	Sydney Kings	119–101	Townsville Crocodiles	Sydney Entertainment Centre	N/A	boxscore
6/03/1999	West Sydney Razorbacks	92–77	Wollongong Hawks	Whitlam Centre	N/A	boxscore

=== Round 23 ===
Date	Home	Score	Away	Venue	Crowd	Boxscore
12/03/1999	Melbourne Tigers	81–89	Perth Wildcats	Melbourne Park	N/A	boxscore
12/03/1999	Wollongong Hawks	96–79	Canberra Cannons	WIN Entertainment Centre	N/A	boxscore
12/03/1999	Brisbane Bullets	83–98	Adelaide 36ers	Brisbane Convention & Exhibition Centre	N/A	boxscore
12/03/1999	Sydney Kings	98–91	West Sydney Razorbacks	Sydney Entertainment Centre	N/A	boxscore
13/03/1999	Victoria Titans	97–89	Melbourne Tigers	Melbourne Park	N/A	boxscore
13/03/1999	Canberra Cannons	97–107	Brisbane Bullets	AIS Arena	N/A	boxscore
13/03/1999	Townsville Crocodiles	92–107	Adelaide 36ers	Townsville Entertainment Centre	N/A	boxscore
14/03/1999	Perth Wildcats	111–113	Newcastle Falcons	Perth Entertainment Centre	N/A	boxscore

== Ladder ==
Pos	1998–99 NBL season											
Pos	Team	Pld	W	L	PCT	Last 5	Streak	Home	Away	PF	PA	PP
1	Adelaide 36ers	26	18	8	69.23%	4–1	W3	11–3	7–5	2572	2379	108.11%
2	Melbourne Tigers	26	17	9	65.38%	2–3	L3	10–3	7–6	2573	2472	104.09%
3	Wollongong Hawks^{1}	26	16	10	61.54%	4–1	W1	10–3	6–7	2332	2328	100.17%
4	Victoria Titans^{1}	26	16	10	61.54%	4–1	W4	10–3	6–7	2339	2245	104.19%
5	Brisbane Bullets^{2}	26	13	13	50.00%	1–4	W1	6–6	7–7	2476	2462	100.57%
6	Perth Wildcats^{2}	26	13	13	50.00%	3–2	L1	7–6	6–7	2463	2424	101.61%
7	Townsville Crocodiles^{3}	26	12	14	46.15%	3–2	L2	9–4	3–10	2429	2397	101.33%
8	West Sydney Razorbacks^{3}	26	12	14	46.15%	2–3	L1	8–5	4–9	2375	2446	97.10%
9	Sydney Kings^{4}	26	9	17	34.62%	2–3	W2	5–8	4–9	2411	2559	94.22%
10	Newcastle Falcons^{4}	26	9	17	34.62%	1–4	W1	4–9	5–8	2421	2544	95.17%
11	Canberra Cannons	26	8	18	30.77%	1–4	L2	5–8	3–10	2462	2597	94.80%

Updated to match(es) played on 14 March 1999. Source: NBL.com.au

The NBL tie-breaker system as outlined in the NBL Rules and Regulations states that in the case of an identical win–loss record, the results in games played between the teams will determine order of seeding.

^{1}Wollongong Hawks won Head-to-Head (2-0).

^{2}Brisbane Bullets won Head-to-Head (2-1).

^{3}Townsville Crocodiles won Head-to-Head (2-1).

^{4}Sydney Kings won Head-to-Head (2-1).

== Finals ==
=== Playoff bracket ===
Qualifying Finals
1	Adelaide 36ers	99	97	X
6	Perth Wildcats	87	80	X
2	Melbourne Tigers	100	98	X
5	Brisbane Bullets	85	92	X
3	Wollongong Hawks	65	82	X
4	Victoria Titans	96	91	X

Semifinals
1	Adelaide 36ers	93	99	X
3	Wollongong Hawks	81	98	X
2	Melbourne Tigers	77	87	X
4	Victoria Titans	80	94	X

Grand Final
1	Adelaide 36ers	104	82	80
4	Victoria Titans	94	88	69

=== Qualifying Finals ===
Date	Home	Score	Away	Venue	Crowd	Boxscore
19/03/1999	Victoria Titans	96–65	Wollongong Hawks	Melbourne Park	N/A	boxscore
19/03/1999	Perth Wildcats	87–99	Adelaide 36ers	Challenge Stadium	N/A	boxscore
20/03/1999	Brisbane Bullets	85–100	Melbourne Tigers	Brisbane Convention & Exhibition Centre	N/A	boxscore
26/03/1999	Melbourne Tigers	98–92	Brisbane Bullets	Melbourne Park	N/A	boxscore
26/03/1999	Adelaide 36ers	97–80	Perth Wildcats	Adelaide Arena	N/A	boxscore
27/03/1999	Wollongong Hawks	82–91	Victoria Titans	WIN Entertainment Centre	N/A	boxscore

=== Semi-finals ===
Date	Home	Score	Away	Venue	Crowd	Boxscore
2/04/1999	Wollongong Hawks	81–93	Adelaide 36ers	WIN Entertainment Centre	N/A	boxscore
3/04/1999	Victoria Titans	80–77	Melbourne Tigers	Melbourne Park	N/A	boxscore
9/04/1999	Melbourne Tigers	87–94	Victoria Titans	Melbourne Park	N/A	boxscore
10/04/1999	Adelaide 36ers	99–98	Wollongong Hawks	Adelaide Arena	N/A	boxscore

=== Grand Final ===
Date	Home	Score	Away	Venue	Crowd	Boxscore
16/04/1999	Victoria Titans	94–104	Adelaide 36ers	Melbourne Park	N/A	boxscore
21/04/1999	Adelaide 36ers	82–88	Victoria Titans	Adelaide Arena	N/A	boxscore
23/04/1999	Adelaide 36ers	80–69	Victoria Titans	Adelaide Arena	N/A	boxscore

== 1998–99 NBL statistics leaders ==
Category	Player	Team	Stat
Points per game	Andrew Gaze	Melbourne Tigers	33.5
Rebounds per game	Mark Bradtke	Melbourne Tigers	12.0
Assists per game	Darryl McDonald	Victoria Titans	8.2
Steals per game	Darryl McDonald	Victoria Titans	8.2
Blocks per game	Simon Dwight	West Sydney Razorbacks	3.0
Free throw percentage	Andrew Gaze	Melbourne Tigers	89.4%
Three-point field goal percentage	John Rillie	West Sydney Razorbacks	47.5%

== NBL awards ==
- Most Valuable Player: Steve Woodberry, Brisbane Bullets
- Most Valuable Player Grand Final: Brett Maher, Adelaide 36ers
- Rookie of the Year: Damien Ryan, Canberra Cannons
- Best Defensive Player: Darnell Mee, Adelaide 36ers
- Best Sixth Man: Bruce Bolden, West Sydney Razorbacks
- Most Improved Player: C.J. Bruton, Wollongong Hawks
- Coach of the Year: Lindsay Gaze, Melbourne Tigers & Brendan Joyce, Wollongong Hawks

== All NBL Team ==
#	Player	Team
PG	Steve Woodberry	Brisbane Bullets
SG	Andrew Gaze	Melbourne Tigers
SF	Lanard Copeland	Melbourne Tigers
PF	Kevin Brooks	Adelaide 36ers
C	Mark Bradtke	Melbourne Tigers
