= NBL Championship =

Finals series of the Australian National Basketball League

- NBL Championship logo
- Status: Active
- Genre: Sporting event
- Date: March – April
- Frequency: Annual
- Countries: Australia; New Zealand
- Inaugurated: 1979
- Organiser: National Basketball League
- Sponsor: Hungry Jack's (2018–present)
- Most titles: Perth Wildcats (10 titles)
- Website: NBL.com.au
- 2026 NBL Finals

The NBL Championship is the annual championship series of the National Basketball League (NBL). The entrants are determined by the victors of the two Semifinals series, who engage in a best-of-five game series to determine the league champion. The winners of the Championship series are awarded the Dr John Raschke Trophy.

== History ==
Prior to 1986, the NBL Grand Final was decided by a single game. From 2004 until 2009, the series was expanded to a best-of-five games.

Dr John Raschke Trophy

The first NBL Grand Final was played on 10 June 1979 at the Albert Park Basketball Stadium in Melbourne. The St. Kilda Saints defeated the Canberra Cannons 94-93 to become the inaugural NBL Champions.

The Perth Wildcats hold the record for most Grand Final appearances with 15 between 1987 and 2019/20. They have also won a record 10 NBL Championships. The Wildcats have not missed the NBL Finals since 1987, a record of 35 consecutive years.

No Grand Final MVP was awarded between 1981 and 1985. The NBL Grand Final Most Valuable Player Award winner receives the Larry Sengstock Medal, which is named in honour of Larry Sengstock, the winner of the league's first Grand Final MVP award in 1979.

Rocky Smith (1980), Leroy Loggins (1987), Scott Fisher (1989), Chris Williams (2002/03), Chris Anstey (2005/06) and Cedric Jackson (2012/13) all won the Grand Final MVP and the regular season MVP awards in the same season.

During 2022–23 NBL season, NBL Grand Final has renamed as NBL Championship Series following a finals format change which saw the introduction of a play-in tournament.

== Results ==
| Year | Date | Home | Score | Away | MVP | Arena |
|---|---|---|---|---|---|---|
| 1979 | 10 June | St. Kilda Saints | 94–93 | Canberra Cannons | Larry Sengstock | Albert Park Basketball Stadium |
| 1980 | 15 June | West Adelaide Bearcats | 88–113 | St. Kilda Saints | Rocky Smith | Dowling Street Stadium |
| 1981 | 28 June | Launceston Casino City | 75–54 | Nunawading Spectres | N/A | Apollo Stadium |
| 1982 | 18 July | West Adelaide Bearcats | 80–74 | Geelong Cats | N/A | Newcastle Sports Entertainment Centre |
| 1983 | 4 July | Canberra Cannons | 75–73 | West Adelaide Bearcats | N/A | Kilsyth Stadium |
| 1984 | 1 July | Brisbane Bullets | 82–84 | Canberra Cannons | N/A | The Glass House |
| 1985 | 7 September | Brisbane Bullets | 121–95 | Adelaide 36ers | N/A | Sleeman Sports Centre |
| 1986 | 11 October | Brisbane Bullets | 119–122 | Adelaide 36ers | Mark Davis | Brisbane Entertainment Centre |
| 1986 | 17 October | Adelaide 36ers | 83–104 | Brisbane Bullets | Mark Davis | Apollo Stadium |
| 1986 | 19 October | Adelaide 36ers | 113–91 | Brisbane Bullets | Mark Davis | Apollo Stadium |
| 1987 | 10 October | Perth Wildcats | 79–80 | Brisbane Bullets | Leroy Loggins | Challenge Stadium |
| 1987 | 16 October | Brisbane Bullets | 106–87 | Perth Wildcats | Leroy Loggins | Brisbane Entertainment Centre |
| 1988 | 30 July | Canberra Cannons | 120–95 | North Melbourne Giants | Phil Smyth | AIS Arena |
| 1988 | 5 August | North Melbourne Giants | 117–101 | Canberra Cannons | Phil Smyth | The Glass House |
| 1988 | 7 August | North Melbourne Giants | 102–108 | Canberra Cannons | Phil Smyth | The Glass House |
| 1989 | 14 October | Canberra Cannons | 105–111 | North Melbourne Giants | Scott Fisher | AIS Arena |
| 1989 | 20 October | North Melbourne Giants | 111–97 | Canberra Cannons | Scott Fisher | The Glass House |
| 1990 | 19 October | Perth Wildcats | 112–106 | Brisbane Bullets | Ricky Grace | Perth Entertainment Centre |
| 1990 | 26 October | Brisbane Bullets | 106–90 | Perth Wildcats | Ricky Grace | Brisbane Entertainment Centre |
| 1990 | 28 October | Brisbane Bullets | 86–109 | Perth Wildcats | Ricky Grace | Brisbane Entertainment Centre |
| 1991 | 19 October | Eastside Spectres | 83–109 | Perth Wildcats | Pete Hansen | The Glass House |
| 1991 | 25 October | Perth Wildcats | 81–86 | Eastside Spectres | Pete Hansen | Perth Entertainment Centre |
| 1991 | 27 October | Perth Wildcats | 90–80 | Eastside Spectres | Pete Hansen | Perth Entertainment Centre |
| 1992 | 24 October | Melbourne Tigers | 116–98 | S.E. Melbourne Magic | Bruce Bolden | Melbourne Park |
| 1992 | 30 October | S.E. Melbourne Magic | 115–93 | Melbourne Tigers | Bruce Bolden | Melbourne Park |
| 1992 | 1 November | S.E. Melbourne Magic | 95–88 | Melbourne Tigers | Bruce Bolden | Melbourne Park |
| 1993 | 23 October | Melbourne Tigers | 117–113 | Perth Wildcats | Ricky Grace | Melbourne Park |
| 1993 | 29 October | Perth Wildcats | 112–105 | Melbourne Tigers | Ricky Grace | Perth Entertainment Centre |
| 1993 | 31 October | Perth Wildcats | 102–104 | Melbourne Tigers | Ricky Grace | Perth Entertainment Centre |
| 1994 | 22 October | Adelaide 36ers | 93–95 | North Melbourne Giants | Paul Rees | Clipsal Powerhouse |
| 1994 | 28 October | North Melbourne Giants | 117–97 | Adelaide 36ers | Paul Rees | The Glass House |
| 1995 | 7 October | Perth Wildcats | 97–104 | North Melbourne Giants | Andrew Vlahov | Perth Entertainment Centre |
| 1995 | 13 October | North Melbourne Giants | 88–97 | Perth Wildcats | Andrew Vlahov | The Glass House |
| 1995 | 15 October | Perth Wildcats | 108–88 | North Melbourne Giants | Andrew Vlahov | Perth Entertainment Centre |
| 1996 | 25 October | S.E. Melbourne Magic | 89–100 | Melbourne Tigers | Mike Kelly | Melbourne Park |
| 1996 | 1 November | Melbourne Tigers | 84–88 | S.E. Melbourne Magic | Mike Kelly | Melbourne Park |
| 1996 | 3 November | Melbourne Tigers | 70–107 | S.E. Melbourne Magic | Mike Kelly | Melbourne Park |
| 1997 | 25 October | Melbourne Tigers | 111–74 | S.E. Melbourne Magic | Lanard Copeland | Melbourne Park |
| 1997 | 29 October | S.E. Melbourne Magic | 84–78 | Melbourne Tigers | Lanard Copeland | Melbourne Park |
| 1997 | 1 November | S.E. Melbourne Magic | 83–93 | Melbourne Tigers | Lanard Copeland | Melbourne Park |
| 1998 | 28 June | Adelaide 36ers | 100–93 | S.E. Melbourne Magic | Kevin Brooks | Adelaide Arena |
| 1998 | 1 July | S.E. Melbourne Magic | 62–90 | Adelaide 36ers | Kevin Brooks | Melbourne Park |
| 1999 | 16 April | Victoria Titans | 94–104 | Adelaide 36ers | Brett Maher | Melbourne Park |
| 1999 | 21 April | Adelaide 36ers | 82–88 | Victoria Titans | Brett Maher | Adelaide Arena |
| 1999 | 23 April | Adelaide 36ers | 80–63 | Victoria Titans | Brett Maher | Adelaide Arena |
| 2000 | 7 April | Victoria Titans | 78–84 | Perth Wildcats | Marcus Timmons | Melbourne Park |
| 2000 | 12 April | Perth Wildcats | 83–76 | Victoria Titans | Marcus Timmons | Perth Entertainment Centre |
| 2001 | 22 April | Wollongong Hawks | 104–101 | Townsville Crocodiles | Glen Saville | Wollongong Entertainment Centre |
| 2001 | 28 April | Townsville Crocodiles | 114–97 | Wollongong Hawks | Glen Saville | Townsville Entertainment Centre |
| 2001 | 29 April | Townsville Crocodiles | 94–97 | Wollongong Hawks | Glen Saville | Wollongong Entertainment Centre |
| 2002 | 12 April | Adelaide 36ers | 106–97 | West Sydney Razorbacks | Brett Maher | Adelaide Arena |
| 2002 | 14 April | West Sydney Razorbacks | 103–100 | Adelaide 36ers | Brett Maher | State Sports Centre |
| 2002 | 19 April | Adelaide 36ers | 125–107 | West Sydney Razorbacks | Brett Maher | Adelaide Arena |
| 2003 | 3 April | Sydney Kings | 98–94 | Perth Wildcats | Chris Williams | Sydney Entertainment Centre |
| 2003 | 6 April | Perth Wildcats | 101–117 | Sydney Kings | Chris Williams | Challenge Stadium |
| 2004 | 24 March | Sydney Kings | 96–76 | West Sydney Razorbacks | Matthew Nielsen | Sydney Entertainment Centre |
| 2004 | 26 March | West Sydney Razorbacks | 87–72 | Sydney Kings | Matthew Nielsen | State Sports Centre |
| 2004 | 31 March | Sydney Kings | 80–82 | West Sydney Razorbacks | Matthew Nielsen | Sydney Entertainment Centre |
| 2004 | 4 April | West Sydney Razorbacks | 77–82 | Sydney Kings | Matthew Nielsen | State Sports Centre |
| 2004 | 6 April | Sydney Kings | 90–79 | West Sydney Razorbacks | Matthew Nielsen | Sydney Entertainment Centre |
| 2005 | 11 March | Sydney Kings | 96–73 | Wollongong Hawks | Jason Smith | Sydney Entertainment Centre |
| 2005 | 13 March | Wollongong Hawks | 80–105 | Sydney Kings | Jason Smith | Wollongong Entertainment Centre |
| 2005 | 19 March | Sydney Kings | 112–85 | Wollongong Hawks | Jason Smith | Sydney Entertainment Centre |
| 2006 | 24 February | Sydney Kings | 93–100 | Melbourne Tigers | Chris Anstey | Sydney Entertainment Centre |
| 2006 | 26 February | Melbourne Tigers | 103–99 | Sydney Kings | Chris Anstey | State Netball Hockey Centre |
| 2006 | 28 February | Sydney Kings | 83–88 | Melbourne Tigers | Chris Anstey | Sydney Entertainment Centre |
| 2007 | 2 March | Brisbane Bullets | 98–95 | Melbourne Tigers | Sam Mackinnon | Brisbane Entertainment Centre |
| 2007 | 4 March | Melbourne Tigers | 105–91 | Brisbane Bullets | Sam Mackinnon | State Netball Hockey Centre |
| 2007 | 7 March | Brisbane Bullets | 113–93 | Melbourne Tigers | Sam Mackinnon | Brisbane Entertainment Centre |
| 2007 | 9 March | Melbourne Tigers | 94–103 | Brisbane Bullets | Sam Mackinnon | State Netball Hockey Centre |
| 2008 | 5 March | Sydney Kings | 95–74 | Melbourne Tigers | Chris Anstey | Sydney Entertainment Centre |
| 2008 | 7 March | Melbourne Tigers | 104–93 | Sydney Kings | Chris Anstey | State Netball Hockey Centre |
| 2008 | 9 March | Sydney Kings | 87–89 | Melbourne Tigers | Chris Anstey | Sydney Entertainment Centre |
| 2008 | 12 March | Melbourne Tigers | 87–90 | Sydney Kings | Chris Anstey | State Netball Hockey Centre |
| 2008 | 14 March | Sydney Kings | 73–85 | Melbourne Tigers | Chris Anstey | Sydney Entertainment Centre |
| 2009 | 4 March | South Dragons | 93–81 | Melbourne Tigers | Donta Smith | Hisense Arena |
| 2009 | 6 March | Melbourne Tigers | 88–83 | South Dragons | Donta Smith | State Netball Hockey Centre |
| 2009 | 8 March | South Dragons | 84–67 | Melbourne Tigers | Donta Smith | Hisense Arena |
| 2009 | 11 March | Melbourne Tigers | 108–95 | South Dragons | Donta Smith | State Netball Hockey Centre |
| 2009 | 13 March | South Dragons | 102–91 | Melbourne Tigers | Donta Smith | Hisense Arena |
| 2010 | 5 March | Perth Wildcats | 75–64 | Wollongong Hawks | Kevin Lisch | Challenge Stadium |
| 2010 | 9 March | Wollongong Hawks | 75–63 | Perth Wildcats | Kevin Lisch | WIN Entertainment Centre |
| 2010 | 12 March | Perth Wildcats | 96–72 | Wollongong Hawks | Kevin Lisch | Challenge Stadium |
| 2011 | 20 April | New Zealand Breakers | 85–67 | Cairns Taipans | Thomas Abercrombie | North Shore Events Centre |
| 2011 | 24 April | Cairns Taipans | 85–81 | New Zealand Breakers | Thomas Abercrombie | Cairns Convention Centre |
| 2011 | 29 April | New Zealand Breakers | 71–53 | Cairns Taipans | Thomas Abercrombie | North Shore Events Centre |
| 2012 | 12 April | New Zealand Breakers | 104–98 | Perth Wildcats | C.J. Bruton | Vector Arena |
| 2012 | 20 April | Perth Wildcats | 87–86 | New Zealand Breakers | C.J. Bruton | Challenge Stadium |
| 2012 | 24 April | New Zealand Breakers | 79–73 | Perth Wildcats | C.J. Bruton | Vector Arena |
| 2013 | 7 April | New Zealand Breakers | 79–67 | Perth Wildcats | Cedric Jackson | Vector Arena |
| 2013 | 12 April | Perth Wildcats | 66–70 | New Zealand Breakers | Cedric Jackson | Perth Arena |
| 2014 | 7 April | Perth Wildcats | 92–85 | Adelaide 36ers | Jermaine Beal | Perth Arena |
| 2014 | 11 April | Adelaide 36ers | 89–84 | Perth Wildcats | Jermaine Beal | Adelaide Arena |
| 2014 | 13 April | Perth Wildcats | 93–59 | Adelaide 36ers | Jermaine Beal | Perth Arena |
| 2015 | 6 March | Cairns Taipans | 71–86 | New Zealand Breakers | Cedric Jackson | Cairns Convention Centre |
| 2015 | 8 March | New Zealand Breakers | 83–81 | Cairns Taipans | Cedric Jackson | North Shore Events Centre |
| 2016 | 2 March | Perth Wildcats | 82–76 | New Zealand Breakers | Damian Martin | Perth Arena |
| 2016 | 4 March | New Zealand Breakers | 72–68 | Perth Wildcats | Damian Martin | North Shore Events Centre |
| 2016 | 6 March | Perth Wildcats | 75–52 | New Zealand Breakers | Damian Martin | Perth Arena |
| 2017 | 26 February | Perth Wildcats | 89–77 | Illawarra Hawks | Bryce Cotton | Perth Arena |
| 2017 | 1 March | Illawarra Hawks | 77–89 | Perth Wildcats | Bryce Cotton | Wollongong Entertainment Centre |
| 2017 | 5 March | Perth Wildcats | 95–86 | Illawarra Hawks | Bryce Cotton | Perth Arena |
| 2018 | 16 March | Melbourne United | 107–96 | Adelaide 36ers | Chris Goulding | Hisense Arena |
| 2018 | 18 March | Adelaide 36ers | 110–95 | Melbourne United | Chris Goulding | Adelaide Arena |
| 2018 | 23 March | Melbourne United | 101–98 | Adelaide 36ers | Chris Goulding | Hisense Arena |
| 2018 | 25 March | Adelaide 36ers | 90–81 | Melbourne United | Chris Goulding | Adelaide Arena |
| 2018 | 31 March | Melbourne United | 100–82 | Adelaide 36ers | Chris Goulding | Hisense Arena |
| 2019 | 8 March | Perth Wildcats | 81–71 | Melbourne United | Terrico White | Perth Arena |
| 2019 | 10 March | Melbourne United | 92–74 | Perth Wildcats | Terrico White | Melbourne Arena |
| 2019 | 15 March | Perth Wildcats | 96–67 | Melbourne United | Terrico White | Perth Arena |
| 2019 | 17 March | Melbourne United | 84–97 | Perth Wildcats | Terrico White | Melbourne Arena |
| 2020 | 8 March | Sydney Kings | 86–88 | Perth Wildcats | Bryce Cotton | Sydney SuperDome |
| 2020 | 13 March | Perth Wildcats | 83–97 | Sydney Kings | Bryce Cotton | Perth Arena |
| 2020 | 15 March | Sydney Kings | 96–111 | Perth Wildcats | Bryce Cotton | Sydney SuperDome |
| 2021 | 18 June | Perth Wildcats | 70–73 | Melbourne United | Jock Landale | Perth Arena |
| 2021 | 20 June | Perth Wildcats | 74–83 | Melbourne United | Jock Landale | Perth Arena |
| 2021 | 25 June | Melbourne United | 81–76 | Perth Wildcats | Jock Landale | John Cain Arena |
| 2022 | 6 May | Sydney Kings | 95–78 | Tasmania JackJumpers | Xavier Cooks | Sydney SuperDome |
| 2022 | 8 May | Tasmania JackJumpers | 86–90 | Sydney Kings | Xavier Cooks | Derwent Entertainment Centre |
| 2022 | 11 May | Sydney Kings | 97–88 | Tasmania JackJumpers | Xavier Cooks | Sydney SuperDome |
| 2023 | 3 March | Sydney Kings | 87–95 | New Zealand Breakers | Derrick Walton | Sydney SuperDome |
| 2023 | 5 March | New Zealand Breakers | 74–81 | Sydney Kings | Derrick Walton | Spark Arena |
| 2023 | 10 March | Sydney Kings | 91–68 | New Zealand Breakers | Derrick Walton | Sydney SuperDome |
| 2023 | 12 March | New Zealand Breakers | 80–70 | Sydney Kings | Derrick Walton | Spark Arena |
| 2023 | 15 March | Sydney Kings | 77–69 | New Zealand Breakers | Derrick Walton | Sydney SuperDome |
| 2024 | 17 March | Melbourne United | 104–81 | Tasmania JackJumpers | Jack McVeigh | John Cain Arena |
| 2024 | 22 March | Tasmania JackJumpers | 82–77 | Melbourne United | Jack McVeigh | Derwent Entertainment Centre |
| 2024 | 24 March | Melbourne United | 91–93 | Tasmania JackJumpers | Jack McVeigh | John Cain Arena |
| 2024 | 28 March | Tasmania JackJumpers | 86–88 | Melbourne United | Jack McVeigh | Derwent Entertainment Centre |
| 2024 | 31 March | Melbourne United | 81–83 | Tasmania JackJumpers | Jack McVeigh | John Cain Arena |
| 2025 | 8 March | Illawarra Hawks | 88–96 | Melbourne United | Matthew Dellavedova | Wollongong Entertainment Centre |
| 2025 | 12 March | Melbourne United | 100–102 | Illawarra Hawks | Matthew Dellavedova | John Cain Arena |
| 2025 | 16 March | Illawarra Hawks | 77–83 | Melbourne United | Matthew Dellavedova | Wollongong Entertainment Centre |
| 2025 | 19 March | Melbourne United | 71–80 | Illawarra Hawks | Matthew Dellavedova | John Cain Arena |
| 2025 | 23 March | Illawarra Hawks | 114–104 | Melbourne United | Matthew Dellavedova | Wollongong Entertainment Centre |
| 2026 | 21 March | Sydney Kings | 112–68 | Adelaide 36ers | Kendric Davis | Sydney SuperDome |
| 2026 | 27 March | Adelaide 36ers | 91–89 | Sydney Kings | Kendric Davis | Adelaide Entertainment Centre |
| 2026 | 29 March | Sydney Kings | 106–93 | Adelaide 36ers | Kendric Davis | Sydney SuperDome |
| 2026 | 1 April | Adelaide 36ers | 92–91 | Sydney Kings | Kendric Davis | Adelaide Entertainment Centre |
| 2026 | 5 April | Sydney Kings | 113–101 | Adelaide 36ers | Kendric Davis | Sydney SuperDome |

== Championship record ==
| Finals | Team | Win | Loss | % | Note |
|---|---|---|---|---|---|
| 16 | **Perth Wildcats** | 10 | 6 | .625 | Have made every playoffs since 1986 to 2021. |
| 13 | **Melbourne United** | 6 | 7 | .462 | Four championships won as the Tigers. Rebranded as Melbourne United in 2014. |
| 9 | **Sydney Kings** | 6 | 3 | .667 | Team folded in 2008, returned in 2010. |
| 8 | **Adelaide 36ers** | 4 | 4 | .500 | Won the first 3-game Grand Final series in 1986. |
| 6 | **New Zealand Breakers** | 4 | 2 | .667 | Became the first non-Australian NBL champions in 2011. |
| 6 | **Brisbane Bullets** | 3 | 3 | .500 | Team folded in 2008, won the last stand alone GF in 1985, returned in 2016–17. |
| 5 | Canberra Cannons | 3 | 2 | .600 | Became the Hunter Pirates in 2003. |
| 5 | **Illawarra Hawks** | 2 | 3 | .400 | Won title as **Wollongong Hawks** in 2001. |
| 4 | North Melbourne Giants | 2 | 2 | .500 | Merged to form the Victoria Titans in 1998–99. |
| 4 | S.E. Melbourne Magic | 2 | 2 | .500 | Merged to form the Victoria Titans in 1998–99. |
| 2 | St. Kilda Saints | 2 | 0 | 1.000 | Inaugural NBL champions in 1979. Became the Westside Saints in 1987. |
| 3 | West Adelaide Bearcats | 1 | 2 | .333 | Left the NBL in 1984, now in the NBL1 Central. |
| 2 | **Tasmania JackJumpers** | 1 | 1 | .500 | Runners-up in 2022. Champions 2024. |
| 1 | Launceston Casino City | 1 | 0 | 1.000 | Played only 3 NBL seasons, team folded in 1983. |
| 1 | South Dragons | 1 | 0 | 1.000 | Quit the NBL after their 2009 title win. |
| 2 | **Cairns Taipans** | 0 | 2 | .000 | Runners-up in 2011, 2015. |
| 2 | Victoria Titans | 0 | 2 | .000 | Became the Victoria Giants in 2002. |
| 2 | West Sydney Razorbacks | 0 | 2 | .000 | Became the Sydney Spirit in 2008, folded in 2009. |
| 1 | Eastside Spectres | 0 | 1 | .000 | Merged to form the S.E. Melbourne Magic in 1991. |
| 1 | Geelong Cats | 0 | 1 | .000 | Became the Geelong Supercats in 1988, now in NBL1 South. |
| 1 | Nunawading Spectres | 0 | 1 | .000 | Became the Eastside Spectres in 1987, now in NBL1 South. |
| 1 | Townsville Crocodiles | 0 | 1 | .000 | Runners-up in 2001. |

* Teams in bold are currently in the NBL.

== See also ==
- NBL Finals
- List of NBL champions
- WNBL Grand Final
