= Dave Simmons (basketball, born 1963) =

American-Australian basketball player

Personal information
- Born: April 13, 1963 (age 63)
- Listed height: 205 cm (6 ft 9 in)
- Listed weight: 112 kg (247 lb)

Career information
- High school: South Bronx (Bronx, New York)
- College: Oklahoma Baptist (1981–1982); Redlands CC (1983–1984); Oklahoma Baptist (1984–1985); Oklahoma City (1986–1987)
- NBA draft: 1987: undrafted
- Playing career: 1989–2001
- Position: Power forward / center
- Number: 25
- Coaching career: 2003–2005

Career history

Playing
- 1989–1996: Melbourne Tigers
- 1994: Westchester Stallions
- 1997: Newcastle Falcons
- 1998: Sydney Kings
- 1998–1999: Newcastle Falcons
- 1999–2001: Canberra Cannons

Coaching
- 2003: Hunter Pirates (assistant)
- 2003–2004: Hunter Pirates (interim)
- 2004–2005: Hunter Pirates (assistant)

Career highlights
- NBL champion (1993); All-NBL Second Team (1990); NBL All-Star (1990); No. 25 retired by Melbourne Tigers

David Simmons (born April 13, 1963) is an American-Australian former professional basketball player who played 13 seasons in the Australian National Basketball League (NBL). He was named an NBL All-Star and won an NBL championship with the Melbourne Tigers, who retired his No. 25. He also had a two-year coaching stint with the Hunter Pirates. Simmons is the father of National Basketball Association (NBA) player Ben Simmons.

== High school and college ==
A New York City native, Simmons attended South Bronx High School in The Bronx before playing college basketball in the state of Oklahoma. He first joined Oklahoma Baptist in 1981, but left after one season after struggling academically. He resurfaced at El Reno Junior College (now called Redlands) the next season and averaged 20 points a game, before returning to Oklahoma Baptist for the 1984–85 season.

Simmons transferred to Oklahoma City in 1985 and sat out the season. He went on to average 12 points per game during the 1986–87 season.

== Professional career ==
After graduating from Oklahoma City and moving around Central and South America for a short while, Simmons signed with the Melbourne Tigers of the Australian National Basketball League in 1989. He and fellow American Dave Colbert were fan favorites in Melbourne as they brought immediate success to a booming franchise. In his first NBL game, Simmons scored 28 points against the Hobart Devils. He backed this up with a 25-point, 15-rebound effort against the Eastside Melbourne Spectres the next night. He went on to score 30 or more points seven times in his debut season, including a 40-point performance against the Brisbane Bullets on August 20. To conclude a successful season, Simmons, Colbert and Australian basketball legend Andrew Gaze helped the Tigers reach the NBL post-season for the first time in club history. Simmons continued to play with the Tigers through the early 1990s, earning All-Star honors in his second season and helped the Tigers win the NBL championship in 1993.

In the spring of 1994, Simmons joined the Westchester Stallions of the United States Basketball League before returning to the Melbourne Tigers for the 1994 NBL season. Simmons was considered the ultimate team man as he adjusted his play to suit his role every season. However, following the conclusion of the 1996 season, the Tigers parted ways with Simmons as they wanted change with an import who could provide more offence than what they felt Simmons could give the team. Simmons subsequently joined the Newcastle Falcons in 1997 but managed just one season with the club. He joined the Sydney Kings a month into the 1998 season, but his stint did not last long, as he left the club after appearing in just six games.

In December 1998, Simmons returned to the Newcastle Falcons, signing with the club for the rest of the 1998–99 NBL season as a replacement for sacked import Todd Mundt. Following the conclusion of the NBL season, he joined the Rockhampton Rockets for the 1999 QBL season.

In September 1999, Simmons signed with the Canberra Cannons as a naturalized Australian to replace injured import Clayton Ritter. He played two seasons for the Cannons but finished his career on a sour note when he was released by the club with six games to go in the 2000–01 season due to off court issues that were not disclosed to the public.

== Coaching career ==
Simmons joined the Hunter Pirates as an assistant coach for the 2003–04 NBL season. He was appointed interim head coach in December 2003 after Bruce Palmer was sacked. Following the appointment of Adrian Hurley as Pirates head coach for the 2004–05 season, Simmons remained with the club as assistant coach.

== Personal life ==
Simmons is an African American who became a naturalized Australian citizen. He and his wife Julie, a white Australian, have two children: daughter Olivia and son Ben. He also has four step-children: Melissa, Emily, Liam and Sean; Emily is the wife of NFL player Michael Bush. His long-time friend, David Patrick, is the godfather of his son Ben. Patrick was an assistant coach at Louisiana State University (LSU) during Ben's lone season there. Ben Simmons was selected by the Philadelphia 76ers with the first overall pick in the 2016 NBA draft.
