= 2004–05 NBL season =

Professional basketball season

- Logo of the league sponsored by Philips
- League: National Basketball League
- Season: 2004–05
- Dates: 29 September 2004 – 19 March 2005
- Teams: 11
- TV partners: Australia: Fox Sports; New Zealand: Sky Sport

Regular season
- Season champions: Sydney Kings
- Season MVP: (United States) Brian Wethers (Hunter)

Finals
- Champions: Sydney Kings (3rd title)
- Runners-up: Wollongong Hawks
- Semifinalists: Townsville Crocodiles; Brisbane Bullets
- Finals MVP: (Australia) Jason Smith (Sydney)

Statistical leaders
Points	(United States) Brian Wethers (Hunter)	24.3
Rebounds	(United States) Chris Burgess (Cairns)	13.6
Assists	(United States) Darnell Mee (Wollongong)	7.7

NBL seasons
- ← 2003–04 2005–06 →

The 2004–05 NBL season was the 27th season of competition since its establishment in 1979. A total of 11 teams contested the league, the Victoria Giants has been folded.

== Regular season ==
The 2004-05 regular season took place over 21 rounds between 29 September 2004 and 20 February 2005.

=== Round 1 ===
Date	Home	Score	Away	Venue	Crowd	Boxscore
29/09/2004	New Zealand Breakers	94–106	Adelaide 36ers	Trusts Stadium	4,300	boxscore
30/09/2004	Hunter Pirates	97–105	Brisbane Bullets	Newcastle Entertainment Centre	1,819	boxscore
1/10/2004	Wollongong Hawks	96–88	Melbourne Tigers	WIN Entertainment Centre	4,000	boxscore
2/10/2004	Perth Wildcats	120–97	West Sydney Razorbacks	Challenge Stadium	4,337	boxscore
2/10/2004	Townsville Crocodiles	114–111	Adelaide 36ers	Townsville Entertainment Centre	5,257	boxscore
2/10/2004	Melbourne Tigers	99–96	Cairns Taipans	State Netball and Hockey Centre	2,680	boxscore

=== Round 2 ===
Date	Home	Score	Away	Venue	Crowd	Boxscore
6/10/2004	Adelaide 36ers	111–91	Townsville Crocodiles	Adelaide Arena	4,398	boxscore
8/10/2004	Hunter Pirates	95–88	Melbourne Tigers	Newcastle Entertainment Centre	2,410	boxscore
9/10/2004	Melbourne Tigers	112–95	Townsville Crocodiles	State Netball and Hockey Centre	2,653	boxscore
9/10/2004	Wollongong Hawks	108–100	Brisbane Bullets	WIN Entertainment Centre	4,000	boxscore
10/10/2004	New Zealand Breakers	96–94	Sydney Kings	Trusts Stadium	2,500	boxscore
10/10/2004	Perth Wildcats	110–93	Cairns Taipans	Challenge Stadium	4,482	boxscore
10/10/2004	West Sydney Razorbacks	106–75	Brisbane Bullets	State Sports Centre	2,500	boxscore

=== Round 3 ===
Date	Home	Score	Away	Venue	Crowd	Boxscore
13/10/2004	Hunter Pirates	72–85	Perth Wildcats	Newcastle Entertainment Centre	2,001	boxscore
13/10/2004	Sydney Kings	90–89	Melbourne Tigers	Sydney Entertainment Centre	3,908	boxscore
15/10/2004	Townsville Crocodiles	101–108	Perth Wildcats	Townsville Entertainment Centre	5,041	boxscore
15/10/2004	New Zealand Breakers	92–111	Wollongong Hawks	North Shore Events Centre	2,250	boxscore
16/10/2004	Melbourne Tigers	109–112	Sydney Kings	State Netball and Hockey Centre	3,070	boxscore
16/10/2004	Cairns Taipans	108–100	Perth Wildcats	Cairns Convention Centre	4,816	boxscore
16/10/2004	Adelaide 36ers	103–101	Hunter Pirates	Adelaide Arena	4,638	boxscore
16/10/2004	Brisbane Bullets	111–113	West Sydney Razorbacks	Brisbane Convention Centre	3,008	boxscore
17/10/2004	Sydney Kings	120–99	Brisbane Bullets	Sydney Entertainment Centre	3,959	boxscore

=== Round 4 ===
Date	Home	Score	Away	Venue	Crowd	Boxscore
20/10/2004	Wollongong Hawks	95–83	Townsville Crocodiles	WIN Entertainment Centre	3,572	boxscore
22/10/2004	Brisbane Bullets	111–105	Sydney Kings	Brisbane Convention Centre	2,809	boxscore
23/10/2004	Cairns Taipans	98–87	Wollongong Hawks	Cairns Convention Centre	4,205	boxscore
23/10/2004	Adelaide 36ers	104–78	New Zealand Breakers	Adelaide Arena	4,642	boxscore
23/10/2004	West Sydney Razorbacks	97–105	Melbourne Tigers	State Sports Centre	2,500	boxscore
24/10/2004	Sydney Kings	107–94	Hunter Pirates	Sydney Entertainment Centre	4,018	boxscore
24/10/2004	Townsville Crocodiles	129–108	Brisbane Bullets	Townsville Entertainment Centre	4,876	boxscore

=== Round 5 ===
Date	Home	Score	Away	Venue	Crowd	Boxscore
27/10/2004	Perth Wildcats	99–117	Wollongong Hawks	Challenge Stadium	4,020	boxscore
27/10/2004	West Sydney Razorbacks	87–84	Cairns Taipans	State Sports Centre	2,000	boxscore
29/10/2004	Sydney Kings	98–82	Cairns Taipans	Sydney Entertainment Centre	4,143	boxscore
29/10/2004	Melbourne Tigers	97–108	Brisbane Bullets	State Netball and Hockey Centre	2,537	boxscore
29/10/2004	New Zealand Breakers	90–83	West Sydney Razorbacks	North Shore Events Centre	1,600	boxscore
30/10/2004	New Zealand Breakers	106–97	West Sydney Razorbacks	Trusts Stadium	2,700	boxscore
30/10/2004	Hunter Pirates	127–115	Brisbane Bullets	Newcastle Entertainment Centre	2,240	boxscore
30/10/2004	Adelaide 36ers	110–75	Cairns Taipans	Adelaide Arena	5,035	boxscore

=== Round 6 ===
Date	Home	Score	Away	Venue	Crowd	Boxscore
1/11/2004	Perth Wildcats	117–111	Townsville Crocodiles	Challenge Stadium	3,110	boxscore
3/11/2004	Sydney Kings	122–106	Adelaide 36ers	Sydney Entertainment Centre	3,469	boxscore
5/11/2004	Wollongong Hawks	99–84	Cairns Taipans	WIN Entertainment Centre	4,543	boxscore
5/11/2004	West Sydney Razorbacks	88–93	Brisbane Bullets	State Sports Centre	2,500	boxscore
6/11/2004	Hunter Pirates	90–81	Wollongong Hawks	Newcastle Entertainment Centre	2,454	boxscore
6/11/2004	Perth Wildcats	108–101	Adelaide 36ers	Challenge Stadium	4,482	boxscore
6/11/2004	Townsville Crocodiles	125–102	Melbourne Tigers	Townsville Entertainment Centre	4,902	boxscore
6/11/2004	Brisbane Bullets	96–105	Cairns Taipans	Brisbane Convention Centre	2,557	boxscore
6/11/2004	New Zealand Breakers	94–108	Sydney Kings	Trusts Stadium	2,615	boxscore

=== Round 7 ===
Date	Home	Score	Away	Venue	Crowd	Boxscore
8/11/2004	Cairns Taipans	91–107	Sydney Kings	Cairns Convention Centre	3,248	boxscore
10/11/2004	Wollongong Hawks	109–83	New Zealand Breakers	WIN Entertainment Centre	3,467	boxscore
13/11/2004	New Zealand Breakers	95–98	Brisbane Bullets	North Shore Events Centre	2,784	boxscore
13/11/2004	Melbourne Tigers	98–84	Cairns Taipans	State Netball and Hockey Centre	2,729	boxscore
13/11/2004	Adelaide 36ers	102–85	West Sydney Razorbacks	Adelaide Arena	5,200	boxscore
13/11/2004	Townsville Crocodiles	125–104	Hunter Pirates	Townsville Entertainment Centre	4,929	boxscore
13/11/2004	Sydney Kings	83–90	Perth Wildcats	Sydney Entertainment Centre	4,879	boxscore
14/11/2004	West Sydney Razorbacks	90–101	Perth Wildcats	Whitlam Centre	1,900	boxscore

=== Round 8 ===
Date	Home	Score	Away	Venue	Crowd	Boxscore
17/11/2004	Cairns Taipans	104–87	Melbourne Tigers	Cairns Convention Centre	3,207	boxscore
17/11/2004	Sydney Kings	91–109	Townsville Crocodiles	Sydney Entertainment Centre	3,600	boxscore
19/11/2004	New Zealand Breakers	98–108	Cairns Taipans	Trusts Stadium	3,100	boxscore
19/11/2004	Wollongong Hawks	106–105	Townsville Crocodiles	WIN Entertainment Centre	4,235	boxscore
19/11/2004	Perth Wildcats	77–83	Hunter Pirates	Challenge Stadium	4,500	boxscore
19/11/2004	Melbourne Tigers	111–94	Adelaide 36ers	State Netball and Hockey Centre	2,052	boxscore
20/11/2004	West Sydney Razorbacks	96–82	Wollongong Hawks	State Sports Centre	2,000	boxscore
21/11/2004	Hunter Pirates	100–94	Townsville Crocodiles	Newcastle Entertainment Centre	3,245	boxscore
21/11/2004	Cairns Taipans	105–108	Brisbane Bullets	Cairns Convention Centre	4,032	boxscore
21/11/2004	Sydney Kings	123–89	West Sydney Razorbacks	Sydney Entertainment Centre	4,101	boxscore
21/11/2004	Adelaide 36ers	95–93	Perth Wildcats	Adelaide Arena	4,666	boxscore

=== Round 9 ===
Date	Home	Score	Away	Venue	Crowd	Boxscore
24/11/2004	Brisbane Bullets	107–98	Perth Wildcats	Brisbane Convention Centre	2,212	boxscore
26/11/2004	Hunter Pirates	88–95	Wollongong Hawks	Newcastle Entertainment Centre	2,900	boxscore
26/11/2004	Melbourne Tigers	103–88	New Zealand Breakers	State Netball and Hockey Centre	2,395	boxscore
26/11/2004	Townsville Crocodiles	102–111	Perth Wildcats	Townsville Entertainment Centre	4,844	boxscore
26/11/2004	West Sydney Razorbacks	93–76	Sydney Kings	Sydney Super Dome	14,805	boxscore
27/11/2004	Cairns Taipans	82–90	Perth Wildcats	Cairns Convention Centre	3,500	boxscore
27/11/2004	Adelaide 36ers	119–107	Melbourne Tigers	Adelaide Arena	4,964	boxscore
27/11/2004	Brisbane Bullets	118–90	Hunter Pirates	Brisbane Convention Centre	2,262	boxscore
28/11/2004	New Zealand Breakers	117–108	Townsville Crocodiles	Trusts Stadium	1,800	boxscore

=== Round 10 ===
Date	Home	Score	Away	Venue	Crowd	Boxscore
1/12/2004	West Sydney Razorbacks	85–82	Townsville Crocodiles	Whitlam Centre	2,112	boxscore
3/12/2004	Wollongong Hawks	127–94	New Zealand Breakers	WIN Entertainment Centre	4,035	boxscore
4/12/2004	Adelaide 36ers	108–84	West Sydney Razorbacks	Adelaide Arena	4,500	boxscore
4/12/2004	Sydney Kings	86–76	Wollongong Hawks	Sydney Entertainment Centre	4,026	boxscore
4/12/2004	Hunter Pirates	112–94	Melbourne Tigers	Newcastle Entertainment Centre	2,809	boxscore
4/12/2004	Brisbane Bullets	86–94	New Zealand Breakers	Brisbane Convention Centre	2,370	boxscore
5/12/2004	Perth Wildcats	90–97	Townsville Crocodiles	Challenge Stadium	3,500	boxscore

=== Round 11 ===
Date	Home	Score	Away	Venue	Crowd	Boxscore
8/12/2004	Hunter Pirates	115–103	Cairns Taipans	Newcastle Entertainment Centre	2,850	boxscore
10/12/2004	Townsville Crocodiles	97–88	Cairns Taipans	Townsville Entertainment Centre	4,904	boxscore
10/12/2004	Wollongong Hawks	89–92	Perth Wildcats	WIN Entertainment Centre	4,341	boxscore
10/12/2004	New Zealand Breakers	106–94	Hunter Pirates	North Shore Events Centre	2,500	boxscore
10/12/2004	West Sydney Razorbacks	114–98	Adelaide 36ers	State Sports Centre	1,947	boxscore
11/12/2004	Melbourne Tigers	119–100	Perth Wildcats	State Netball and Hockey Centre	3,500	boxscore
12/12/2004	Brisbane Bullets	111–93	Wollongong Hawks	Brisbane Convention Centre	2,566	boxscore
12/12/2004	Adelaide 36ers	104–93	Hunter Pirates	Adelaide Arena	4,053	boxscore
12/12/2004	Cairns Taipans	100–86	New Zealand Breakers	Cairns Convention Centre	3,322	boxscore

=== Round 12 ===
Date	Home	Score	Away	Venue	Crowd	Boxscore
15/12/2004	West Sydney Razorbacks	106–96	Perth Wildcats	State Sports Centre	1,963	boxscore
16/12/2004	Sydney Kings	97–96	Hunter Pirates	Sydney Entertainment Centre	3,357	boxscore
17/12/2004	Townsville Crocodiles	97–105	Wollongong Hawks	Townsville Entertainment Centre	4,833	boxscore
17/12/2004	New Zealand Breakers	88–89	Adelaide 36ers	Trusts Stadium	2,750	boxscore
18/12/2004	Perth Wildcats	96–82	West Sydney Razorbacks	Challenge Stadium	4,000	boxscore
18/12/2004	Melbourne Tigers	112–103	Hunter Pirates	State Netball and Hockey Centre	2,341	boxscore
18/12/2004	Cairns Taipans	80–78	Wollongong Hawks	Cairns Convention Centre	3,206	boxscore
18/12/2004	Brisbane Bullets	105–106	Sydney Kings	Brisbane Convention Centre	2,989	boxscore
19/12/2004	Adelaide 36ers	107–110	Townsville Crocodiles	Adelaide Arena	4,187	boxscore

=== Round 13 ===
Date	Home	Score	Away	Venue	Crowd	Boxscore
22/12/2004	Wollongong Hawks	105–81	Adelaide 36ers	WIN Entertainment Centre	4,397	boxscore
22/12/2004	Brisbane Bullets	134–128	Townsville Crocodiles	Brisbane Convention Centre	2,863	boxscore
26/12/2004	West Sydney Razorbacks	98–101	Melbourne Tigers	State Sports Centre	3,147	boxscore

=== Round 14 ===
Date	Home	Score	Away	Venue	Crowd	Boxscore
29/12/2004	Sydney Kings	102–97	New Zealand Breakers	Sydney Entertainment Centre	4,220	boxscore
29/12/2004	Perth Wildcats	88–110	Adelaide 36ers	Challenge Stadium	4,400	boxscore
31/12/2004	Adelaide 36ers	102–94	Sydney Kings	Adelaide Arena	4,187	boxscore
31/12/2004	Townsville Crocodiles	114–103	New Zealand Breakers	Townsville Entertainment Centre	5,257	boxscore
31/12/2004	Melbourne Tigers	96–118	Wollongong Hawks	State Netball and Hockey Centre	2,433	boxscore
31/12/2004	Cairns Taipans	90–99	West Sydney Razorbacks	Cairns Convention Centre	4,728	boxscore
31/12/2004	Brisbane Bullets	108–102	Perth Wildcats	Brisbane Convention Centre	2,309	boxscore
2/01/2005	New Zealand Breakers	110–109	Perth Wildcats	Trusts Stadium	2,079	boxscore
2/01/2005	Hunter Pirates	118–117	Cairns Taipans	Newcastle Entertainment Centre	2,900	boxscore
2/01/2005	Wollongong Hawks	90–61	West Sydney Razorbacks	WIN Entertainment Centre	4,858	boxscore
2/01/2005	Sydney Kings	109–108	Townsville Crocodiles	Sydney Entertainment Centre	4,154	boxscore

=== Round 15 ===
Date	Home	Score	Away	Venue	Crowd	Boxscore
5/01/2005	Brisbane Bullets	98–101	Adelaide 36ers	Brisbane Convention Centre	3,001	boxscore
6/01/2005	Melbourne Tigers	102–83	Hunter Pirates	State Netball and Hockey Centre	2,828	boxscore
7/01/2005	Townsville Crocodiles	123–116	Sydney Kings	Townsville Entertainment Centre	5,122	boxscore
7/01/2005	Wollongong Hawks	100–83	Brisbane Bullets	WIN Entertainment Centre	4,803	boxscore
7/01/2005	New Zealand Breakers	105–106	Cairns Taipans	Trusts Stadium	2,922	boxscore
8/01/2005	Hunter Pirates	113–110	Adelaide 36ers	Newcastle Entertainment Centre	2,922	boxscore
8/01/2005	Perth Wildcats	86–102	Melbourne Tigers	Challenge Stadium	4,482	boxscore
8/01/2005	Brisbane Bullets	123–105	Wollongong Hawks	Brisbane Convention Centre	2,859	boxscore
9/01/2005	Cairns Taipans	76–105	Sydney Kings	Cairns Convention Centre	3,364	boxscore
9/01/2005	West Sydney Razorbacks	113–118	Townsville Crocodiles	Whitlam Centre	2,125	boxscore

=== Round 16 ===
Date	Home	Score	Away	Venue	Crowd	Boxscore
12/01/2005	Melbourne Tigers	112–95	Adelaide 36ers	State Netball and Hockey Centre	3,500	boxscore
12/01/2005	Wollongong Hawks	101–73	Cairns Taipans	WIN Entertainment Centre	4,782	boxscore
14/01/2005	Hunter Pirates	105–96	West Sydney Razorbacks	Newcastle Entertainment Centre	2,938	boxscore
14/01/2005	New Zealand Breakers	105–111	Melbourne Tigers	North Shore Events Centre	2,530	boxscore
14/01/2005	Adelaide 36ers	116–105	Sydney Kings	Adelaide Arena	4,400	boxscore
15/01/2005	Brisbane Bullets	112–95	Hunter Pirates	Brisbane Convention Centre	3,018	boxscore
15/01/2005	Cairns Taipans	98–100	Townsville Crocodiles	Cairns Convention Centre	3,701	boxscore
15/01/2005	Sydney Kings	100–86	West Sydney Razorbacks	Sydney Entertainment Centre	5,127	boxscore
16/01/2005	Perth Wildcats	95–104	Wollongong Hawks	Challenge Stadium	4,000	boxscore
16/01/2005	Townsville Crocodiles	109–101	Melbourne Tigers	Townsville Entertainment Centre	5,142	boxscore

=== Round 17 ===
Date	Home	Score	Away	Venue	Crowd	Boxscore
21/01/2005	New Zealand Breakers	89–103	Hunter Pirates	Trusts Stadium	3,485	boxscore
21/01/2005	Sydney Kings	100–93	Adelaide 36ers	Sydney Entertainment Centre	5,553	boxscore
21/01/2005	Townsville Crocodiles	119–96	West Sydney Razorbacks	Townsville Entertainment Centre	4,790	boxscore
22/01/2005	Wollongong Hawks	80–99	Melbourne Tigers	WIN Entertainment Centre	5,013	boxscore
22/01/2005	Cairns Taipans	107–96	West Sydney Razorbacks	Cairns Convention Centre	3,398	boxscore
22/01/2005	Brisbane Bullets	92–91	Adelaide 36ers	Brisbane Convention Centre	3,500	boxscore
23/01/2005	Melbourne Tigers	98–97	New Zealand Breakers	State Netball and Hockey Centre	2,580	boxscore
23/01/2005	Perth Wildcats	103–88	Sydney Kings	Marrara Indoor Stadium	1,500	boxscore

=== Round 18 ===
Date	Home	Score	Away	Venue	Crowd	Boxscore
26/01/2005	Brisbane Bullets	117–77	New Zealand Breakers	Brisbane Convention Centre	2,719	boxscore
26/01/2005	Adelaide 36ers	121–107	Melbourne Tigers	Adelaide Arena	4,500	boxscore
28/01/2005	Townsville Crocodiles	122–120	Brisbane Bullets	Townsville Entertainment Centre	5,201	boxscore
28/01/2005	Hunter Pirates	107–96	New Zealand Breakers	Newcastle Entertainment Centre	3,049	boxscore
28/01/2005	Perth Wildcats	88–94	Sydney Kings	Singapore Indoor Stadium	7,200	boxscore
29/01/2005	Adelaide 36ers	72–85	Wollongong Hawks	Adelaide Arena	4,500	boxscore
29/01/2005	Cairns Taipans	96–110	Brisbane Bullets	Cairns Convention Centre	3,508	boxscore
29/01/2005	West Sydney Razorbacks	92–106	New Zealand Breakers	Whitlam Centre	2,023	boxscore

=== Round 19 ===
Date	Home	Score	Away	Venue	Crowd	Boxscore
2/02/2005	West Sydney Razorbacks	103–76	Hunter Pirates	State Sports Centre	3,500	boxscore
4/02/2005	Wollongong Hawks	112–118	Adelaide 36ers	WIN Entertainment Centre	4,843	boxscore
4/02/2005	Cairns Taipans	98–96	Hunter Pirates	Cairns Convention Centre	3,092	boxscore
4/02/2005	Perth Wildcats	119–106	Brisbane Bullets	Challenge Stadium	3,783	boxscore
5/02/2005	Melbourne Tigers	109–93	West Sydney Razorbacks	State Netball and Hockey Centre	3,520	boxscore
5/02/2005	Townsville Crocodiles	133–127	Hunter Pirates	Townsville Entertainment Centre	5,146	boxscore
6/02/2005	Adelaide 36ers	105–100	Cairns Taipans	Adelaide Arena	4,573	boxscore

=== Round 20 ===
Date	Home	Score	Away	Venue	Crowd	Boxscore
9/02/2005	New Zealand Breakers	108–109	Townsville Crocodiles	Trusts Stadium	3,634	boxscore
9/02/2005	Sydney Kings	93–95	Wollongong Hawks	Sydney Entertainment Centre	4,380	boxscore
9/02/2005	Hunter Pirates	112–101	Perth Wildcats	Newcastle Entertainment Centre	2,010	boxscore
11/02/2005	Melbourne Tigers	102–100	Brisbane Bullets	State Netball and Hockey Centre	3,052	boxscore
11/02/2005	Hunter Pirates	113–118	Sydney Kings	Newcastle Entertainment Centre	4,008	boxscore
11/02/2005	West Sydney Razorbacks	117–95	Wollongong Hawks	State Sports Centre	2,332	boxscore
12/02/2005	Townsville Crocodiles	133–110	New Zealand Breakers	Townsville Entertainment Centre	5,214	boxscore
12/02/2005	Adelaide 36ers	109–105	Brisbane Bullets	Adelaide Arena	5,842	boxscore
12/02/2005	Sydney Kings	96–74	Melbourne Tigers	Sydney Entertainment Centre	6,606	boxscore
13/02/2005	Wollongong Hawks	135–140	Hunter Pirates	WIN Entertainment Centre	4,781	boxscore
13/02/2005	Cairns Taipans	106–108	New Zealand Breakers	Cairns Convention Centre	3,240	boxscore

=== Round 21 ===
Date	Home	Score	Away	Venue	Crowd	Boxscore
16/02/2005	Melbourne Tigers	101–102	Perth Wildcats	State Netball and Hockey Centre	2,495	boxscore
18/02/2005	Wollongong Hawks	85–77	Sydney Kings	WIN Entertainment Centre	5,839	boxscore
18/02/2005	Hunter Pirates	127–100	West Sydney Razorbacks	Newcastle Entertainment Centre	4,010	boxscore
18/02/2005	Perth Wildcats	129–91	New Zealand Breakers	Challenge Stadium	4,655	boxscore
18/02/2005	Brisbane Bullets	104–91	Melbourne Tigers	Brisbane Convention Centre	3,820	boxscore
19/02/2005	Townsville Crocodiles	121–95	Cairns Taipans	Townsville Entertainment Centre	5,257	boxscore
19/02/2005	West Sydney Razorbacks	85–112	Sydney Kings	State Sports Centre	3,749	boxscore
20/02/2005	Perth Wildcats	108–97	New Zealand Breakers	Challenge Stadium	4,500	boxscore
20/02/2005	Cairns Taipans	101–99	Adelaide 36ers	Cairns Convention Centre	3,475	boxscore

== Ladder ==
Pos	2004–05 NBL season											
Pos	Team	Pld	W	L	PCT	Last 5	Streak	Home	Away	PF	PA	PP
1	Sydney Kings	32	21	11	65.63%	3–2	W1	13–3	8–8	3234	3073	105.24%
2	Wollongong Hawks	32	20	12	62.50%	2–3	W1	12–4	8–8	3164	2994	105.68%
3	Townsville Crocodiles^{1}	32	19	13	59.38%	5–0	W10	13–3	6–10	3512	3398	103.35%
4	Adelaide 36ers^{1}	32	19	13	59.38%	3–2	L1	14–2	5–11	3291	3185	103.33%
5	Brisbane Bullets^{2}	32	17	15	53.13%	2–3	W1	11–5	6–10	3366	3314	101.57%
6	Melbourne Tigers^{2}	32	17	15	53.13%	2–3	L3	12–4	5–11	3226	3205	100.66%
7	Perth Wildcats^{2}	32	17	15	53.13%	4–1	W3	9–7	8–8	3211	3158	101.68%
8	Hunter Pirates	32	15	17	46.88%	3–2	W2	12–4	3–13	3269	3319	98.49%
9	West Sydney Razorbacks^{3}	32	11	21	34.38%	2–3	L2	9–7	2–14	3027	3203	94.51%
10	Cairns Taipans^{3}	32	11	21	34.38%	2–3	W1	8–8	3–13	3033	3213	94.40%
11	New Zealand Breakers	32	9	23	28.13%	1–4	L2	6–10	3–13	3098	3369	91.96%

Updated to match(es) played on 20 February 2005. Source: NBL.com.au

The NBL tie-breaker system as outlined in the NBL Rules and Regulations states that in the case of an identical win–loss record, the results in games played between the teams will determine order of seeding.

^{1}Townsville Crocodiles won Head-to-Head (2-1).

^{2}3-way Head-to-Head between Brisbane Bullets (4-2), Melbourne Tigers (3-3) and Perth Wildcats (2-4).

^{3}West Sydney Razorbacks won Head-to-Head (2-1).

== Finals ==
=== Playoff bracket ===
Elimination Finals
5	Brisbane Bullets	113
8	Hunter Pirates	99
6	Melbourne Tigers	108
7	Perth Wildcats	88

Quarterfinals
4	Adelaide 36ers	110
5	Brisbane Bullets	125
3	Townsville Crocodiles	112
6	Melbourne Tigers	100

Semifinals
1	Sydney Kings	113	111	X
5	Brisbane Bullets	79	105	X
2	Wollongong Hawks	100	109	X
3	Townsville Crocodiles	84	105	X

Grand Final
1	Sydney Kings	96	105	112	X	X
2	Wollongong Hawks	73	80	85	X	X

=== Elimination Finals ===
Date	Home	Score	Away	Venue	Crowd	Boxscore
23/02/2005	Brisbane Bullets	113–99	Hunter Pirates	Brisbane Convention Centre	2,628	boxscore
24/02/2005	Melbourne Tigers	108–88	Perth Wildcats	State Netball and Hockey Centre	2,352	boxscore
25/02/2005	Adelaide 36ers	110–125	Brisbane Bullets	Adelaide Arena	N/A	boxscore
26/02/2005	Townsville Crocodiles	112–100	Melbourne Tigers	Townsville Entertainment Centre	5,257	boxscore

=== Semi-finals ===
Date	Home	Score	Away	Venue	Crowd	Boxscore
1/03/2005	Sydney Kings	113–79	Brisbane Bullets	Sydney Entertainment Centre	4,350	boxscore
2/03/2005	Wollongong Hawks	100–84	Townsville Crocodiles	WIN Entertainment Centre	4,078	boxscore
4/03/2005	Brisbane Bullets	105–111	Sydney Kings	Brisbane Convention Centre	4,000	boxscore
5/03/2005	Townsville Crocodiles	105–109	Wollongong Hawks	Townsville Entertainment Centre	5,257	boxscore

=== Grand Final ===
Date	Home	Score	Away	Venue	Crowd	Boxscore
11/03/2005	Sydney Kings	96–73	Wollongong Hawks	Sydney Entertainment Centre	6,247	boxscore
13/03/2005	Wollongong Hawks	80–105	Sydney Kings	WIN Entertainment Centre	5,820	boxscore
19/03/2005	Sydney Kings	112–85	Wollongong Hawks	Sydney Entertainment Centre	8,878	boxscore

== All Star Game ==
Fox Sports

19 January 2005
18:30

boxscore
report

Aussie All Stars	156–140	World All Stars
Scoring by quarter: 39–41, 37–31, 43–41, 37–27
Pts: Newley 35; Rebs: Rillie 9 Asts: Rillie 10		Pts: Brown 31; Rebs: Farley 12; Asts: Brown 6
Aussie All Stars win, 156–140

Townsville Entertainment Centre, Townsville
Attendance: 5,078

=== Most Valuable Player ===
- Brad Newley (Townsville Crocodiles)

== Awards ==
- NBL Most Valuable Player: Brian Wethers (Hunter Pirates)
- Larry Sengstock Medal (GF MVP): Jason Smith (Sydney Kings)
- NBL Coach of the Year: Adrian Hurley (Hunter Pirates)
- NBL Best Defensive Player: Darnell Mee (Wollongong Hawks)
- NBL Rookie of the Year: Brad Newley (Townsville Crocodiles)
- NBL Most Improved Player: Peter Crawford (Perth Wildcats)
- NBL Best Sixth Man: Brad Newley (Townsville Crocodiles)

== All NBL Team ==
#	Player	Team
PG	Darnell Mee	Wollongong Hawks
SG	Jason Smith	Sydney Kings
SF	Brian Wethers	Hunter Pirates
PF	Chris Burgess	Cairns Taipans
C	Mark Bradtke	Melbourne Tigers

=== Player of the month ===
- October: Jason Smith (Sydney Kings)
- November: John Rillie (Townsville Crocodiles)
- December: Darnell Mee (Wollongong Hawks)
- January: John Rillie (Townsville Crocodiles)
- February: Kavossy Franklin (Sydney Kings)

=== Coach of the month ===
- October: Scott Fisher (Perth Wildcats)
- November: Joey Wright (Brisbane Bullets)
- December: Brian Goorjian (Sydney Kings)
- January: Ian Stacker (Townsville Crocodiles)
- February: Ian Stacker (Townsville Crocodiles)
