= Adrian Hurley =

Australian basketball player and coach

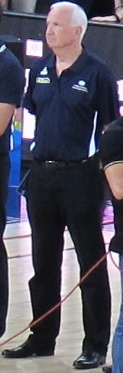
Adrian Hurley

Adrian Rex Hurley OAM (born 21 April 1944) is an Australian former basketball player and coach. His major achievements include establishing the Australian Institute of Sport (AIS) basketball program and leading the Perth Wildcats to the NBL title in 1995. He coached the Australian Boomers at the 1988 and 1992 Olympics and at the 1986 and 1990 FIBA world championships.

== Playing career ==
Hurley began his basketball career in Wollongong in the early 1960s. He won a number of State junior titles and played on the NSW Open team that won the Australian Championships in 1967. He played for NSW for 5 years and captained the 1970 NSW team.

In the early 1970s he moved to the USA where he coached basketball in Eugene, Oregon. At this time he completed his PhD in Education.

== Coaching career ==
On returning to Australia he lectured at Wollongong Institute of Education and commenced coaching the Illawarra Hawks in State and Australian Championships. He coached Illawarra to a number of State titles during this period.

Hurley began his National Basketball League coaching career with the Illawarra Hawks in 1980.

In 1981 he moved to Canberra as the foundation basketball coach of the Australian Institute of Sport. He served as Head Coach at the AIS from 1981 to 1992. From 1983 to 1992 he was a Vice-President of the World Coaches Association and President of the Oceania Region Coaching.

During his time at the AIS he was assistant coach of the Australia national basketball team to Lindsay Gaze at the 1982 FIBA World Championships and the 1984 Olympic Games.

He was appointed as the head coach of the Australian Men's team in 1985 and coached the Boomers at the 1988 and 1992 Summer Olympics and the 1986 and 1990 FIBA World Championships.

In 1987 he coached the AIS women's team to the title at the Australian Women's Club Championships.

At the 1988 Olympics he was the first Australian Men's team coach to take Australia to the medal round where Australia finished in 4th place. In 1992 he coached the Boomers to 6th place at the Barcelona Olympics the second highest finish for the Boomers at that stage. Hurley was a national men's team (Boomers) selector from 1976 to 1992 and a member of the Australian Coaching Council 1985–90.

During this period he conducted and gave lectures at many basketball coaching clinics throughout Australia, the South Pacific and in Europe.

He left the AIS in 1993 and was appointed Perth Wildcats head coach where he coached from 1993 until 1997. As a result, he also gave up coaching the Boomers and was replaced by Barry Barnes. Hurley led the Wildcats to Grand Finals in 1993 and 1995, winning the latter. In 1995 his Perth Wildcats won the "triple crown" when they won the pre-season championship, the minor premiership and the title. This was the first time in NBL history that this feat had been achieved. In the same year he coached the Wildcats at the World Club Championship in London where the Wildcats played the NBA champions the Houston Rockets. The Wildcats finished third in the championship, the highest ever performance by an Australian team.

In 1997 he resigned from the Wildcats.

In March 2004, he was appointed the head coach of the Hunter Pirates. In 2004–05 NBL season, he took the Pirates from last place the previous year (where they had 2 wins) to 15 wins and the playoffs. He was subsequently named the NBL Coach of the Year. He coached the Pirates in 2005–06 and once again they made the playoffs. The Pirates were sold to Singapore for the next season and Hurley retired.

In 2007 he was elected President of Basketball NSW, a position he held until the end of 2010.

== Honours ==
Hurley was named as the NSW Coach of the Year for basketball in 1975, NSW Waratah League Coach of the Year in 2002 and 2003and was named the Newcastle and Hunter region Coach of the Year in 2003. In 1991 he was awarded an Award of Merit by Prime Minister Hawke for his contributions to the Australian Institute of Sport. He was awarded a Basketball Australia Merit Award. In 2000 he received the Australian Sports Medal. He was a Torch Bearer for the 2000 Olympics. In the 2004–05 NBL season he won the NBL Coach of the Year. Hurley is a Life Member of the Australian Basketball Coaches Association. He was awarded the Sports Australia Eunice Gill Sports Educator of the Year in 1990. He is a Life Member of the Illawarra Basketball Association and Basketball Australia. He was inducted into the Basketball Australia Hall of Fame as a coach in 2004. In 1991 he was awarded the Order of Australia Medal.

In 2022, Hurley was inducted into the Sport Australia Hall of Fame.
