= West Sydney Razorbacks =

Defunct NBL club based in Western Sydney

- Nickname: The Pigs
- Leagues: NBL
- Founded: 1998
- Dissolved: 2009
- History: West Sydney Razorbacks; 1998–2008; Sydney Spirit; 2008–2009
- Arena: Whitlam Leisure Centre (1998-2000); State Sports Centre (2001-2009)
- Capacity: 5,006
- Location: Sydney, New South Wales
- Team colors: Navy, red, gold, grey
- Championships: 0
- Retired numbers: 2 (32, 45)

The West Sydney Razorbacks (known in its final season as the Sydney Spirit) were an Australian professional basketball team that competed in the National Basketball League (NBL). The club was based in Sydney, New South Wales.

They were the second team to represent Sydney's west in the NBL, several years after the Fosters (West Sydney) Westars were largely absorbed in a merger with the Sydney Supersonics to form the Sydney Kings. After the demise of the Sydney Kings in 2008, the Razorbacks rebranded themselves as Sydney Spirit to appeal to the greater Sydney community, as they were the sole remaining Sydney-based NBL team prior to the rebirth of the Kings in 2010. The experiment failed and the Spirit folded in 2009.

== History ==
=== As the West Sydney Razorbacks ===
The Razorbacks were formed in 1992 as the West Sydney Slammers in the Continental Basketball Association, and were granted a National Basketball League licence in 1997. The licence was held by the Canterbury-Bankstown Bulldogs Rugby League Club which participated in the National Rugby League (NRL). Canterbury-Bankstown had plans to develop land in the south-west Sydney suburb of Liverpool to create a multi purpose venue, called "The Oasis" which included a licensed club, Rugby League stadium as well as Basketball stadium to house the Razorbacks. Initially though, the club would play home games out of the EG Whitlam Centre in Liverpool.

The club was headed up by basketball Olympian Robbie Cadee as General Manager, who launched the franchise in 1998–99. The club had recruited strongly for their inaugural season led by former league MVP Derek Rucker, veteran Bruce Bolden and young stars Simon Dwight and John Rillie. They were also coach by former Olympian Gordie McLeod. The Razorbacks, played their first game in the NBL on 10 October 1998 defeating the Sydney Kings 103–97. The team also become the first club to win the "Doomsday Double" against the Adelaide 36ers and Perth Wildcats on consecutive nights, however, beyond that initial success, they struggled away from home and ultimately failed the reach the play-offs.

They qualified for the NBL play-offs in their second season - 1999–2000, losing to eventual champions, the Perth Wildcats 2–1 in the first round. During Round 11 of the 1999–00 season, the Razorbacks defeated the Kings 88–81 in an away game at the Sydney SuperDome. This game attracted the still standing (as of 2016–17) NBL attendance record of 17,803. Following their first two seasons in Liverpool the club moved their home games to the 5,006 seat State Sports Centre in Homebush Bay for the 2000–01 season. They failed to build on the success of their previous seasons and finished outside of the play-offs.

General Manager Cadee responded by recruiting Sam Mackinnon from the Townsville Crocodiles and Scott McGregor from rivals Sydney Kings. Despite MacKinnon not playing a single game as result of a knee injury sustained whilst playing for Townsville, the Razorbacks made history in season 2001–02 becoming the first Sydney team in the NBL's 24-year history to contest the Grand Final series. The Adelaide 36ers went on to win the championship with a 2–1 result in the best-of-three series.

For the 2002–03 season the Razorbacks added Willie Farley from Adelaide who replaced foundation player John Rillie, who had taken up an offer to play for AEK Athens in Greece. They also added another former Sydney Kings player Aaron Trahair to their line-up. Rillie would return to the club later in the season.

Late in 2002 it was revealed that "The Oasis" development was riddled with misappropriation of funds and the planned development would not proceed The Razorbacks owners, the Canterbury-Bankstown Bulldogs Rugby League Club had also been found guilty of serious and systematic breaches of the NRL salary cap regulations and were fined the maximum of $500,000 and deducted all 37 premiership points received during the season.

Despite the crisis engulfing its parent, the Razorbacks flourished; breaking club records for most wins in a season, most wins on the road and most wins at home in 2003-04, the Razorbacks made it to their second Grand Final series, this time against the Sydney Kings. In the new best-of-five format, the Razorbacks, who at one stage were up 2–1 in the series, lost 2–3.

Following the loss in the Grand Final to the Sydney Kings the Razorbacks underwent wholesale changes. After coaching the team for their first six seasons, Gordie McLeod was dumped. A new coach was appointed in 2004–05 – Mark Watkins who previously had been the team's long-term assistant coach. High-profile players John Rillie and Sam Mackinnon would also leave for Townsville and Brisbane respectively.

The Razorbacks had two shocking years in a row. The first of these years started off with Dwight's forced retirement with a chronic knee injury and promising youngster Steve Markovic walking out on the club to play in Europe just a few weeks before the start of season. This left Scott McGregor as the sole remaining player from the Grand Final loss to Sydney. The 2005–06 season started off with import Nick Horvath sustaining a knee injury in the first game, which sidelined him for the season, whilst fellow import Jermaine Blackburn was sacked midway through the season.

Cadee axed Watkins and hired Cal Bruton as coach in late 2006 amid a long Razorbacks losing streak. During the 2006-07 season the Razorbacks finally broke a 20-game losing streak against the Wollongong Hawks. Six games after that, the Razorbacks thumped the Kings 106–75 at the Pig Pen, spoiling Brian Goorjian's record of games coached.

Among this turmoil, with "The Oasis" development now dead and buried, the original team owner, Canterbury-Bankstown Rugby League Club, withdrew its support. Tri Media Group later took over the running of the club, which had almost folded.

As a result of their financial troubles, the Razorbacks squad for season 2007–08 was composed mainly of young NBL rookies, headed by first time NBL coach Rob Beveridge. This period was most notable for the emergence of Damian Martin and Matthew Knight who would establish themselves as future stars of the league.

During the 2003–04 season, Bruce Bolden became the first Razorback to have his singlet (No. 32) retired. In 2005-06 Simon Dwight, the NBL's all-time top shot-blocker, had his No. 45 honored as well.

=== As the Sydney Spirit ===
In July 2008, following the Sydney Kings' withdrawal from the NBL, the Razorbacks re-branded as the Sydney Spirit for the 2008–09 season in an attempt to capitalise as the sole basketball side in Sydney. The opening match of the Spirit's season attracted a lacklustre crowd of 1,500 fans.

In late November 2008, the club's owner, Greg Evans, informed the league that he intended to put the club into administration. The league stepped in with a rescue package to allow the Spirit to complete the remainder of the season, with the players and coaching staff agreeing to accept the league's minimum salary. The club also established a special financial account to allow interested parties to make contributions to supplement the league's rescue package; the first contribution was A$30,000 by Australian NBA player Andrew Bogut.

As a result of the agreement to take significant pay cuts, Julian Khazzouh, Liam Rush and import Derrick Low all left the Spirit for overseas clubs.

== Honour roll ==
NBL Championships:	None
NBL Finals appearances:	3 (1999/2000, 2001/02, 2003/04)
NBL Grand Final appearances:	2 (2001/02, 2003/04)
All-NBL First Team:	John Rillie (2003/04), Sam Mackinnon (2003/04)
All-NBL Second Team:	Simon Dwight (2001/02, 2003/04), John Rillie (2001/02, 2002/03)
All-NBL Third Team:	Darnell Hinson (2007/08), Matthew Knight (2008/09)
NBL Rookie of the Year:	Steven Marković (2003/04)
NBL Best Defensive Player:	Simon Dwight (2001/02)
NBL Best Sixth Man:	Bruce Bolden (1998/99)
NBL Most Improved Player:	Liam Rush (2006/07), Matthew Knight (2008/09)
NBL Scoring Champion:	John Rillie (2002/03)
NBL Good Hands Award:	Derek Rucker (1998/99)

Source: NBL.com.au

== Season by season ==
NBL champions	League champions	Runners-up	Finals berth

Season	Tier	League	Regular season					Post-season	Head coach	Captain	Club MVP
Season	Tier	League	Finish	Played	Wins	Losses	Win %	Post-season	Head coach	Captain	Club MVP
West Sydney Razorbacks
1998–99	1	NBL	8th	26	12	14	.462	Did not qualify	Gordie McLeod	Derek Rucker	John Rillie
1999–2000	1	NBL	6th	28	12	16	.429	Lost elimination finals (Perth) 1–2	Gordie McLeod	Derek Rucker	Cheikh Ya Ya Dia
2000–01	1	NBL	8th	28	9	19	.321	Did not qualify	Gordie McLeod	Derek Rucker	John Rillie
2001–02	1	NBL	5th	30	16	14	.533	Won qualifying finals (Perth) 2–0; Won semifinals (Melbourne) 2–1; Lost NBL finals (Adelaide) 1–2	Gordie McLeod	Derek Rucker	John Rillie
2002–03	1	NBL	7th	30	14	16	.467	Did not qualify	Gordie McLeod	Derek Rucker	Sam Mackinnon
2003–04	1	NBL	3rd	33	22	11	.667	Won elimination final (Cairns) 110–88; Won semifinals (Wollongong) 2–0; Lost NBL finals (Sydney) 2–3	Gordie McLeod	Sam Mackinnon	Sam Mackinnon
2004–05	1	NBL	9th	32	11	21	.344	Did not qualify	Mark Watkins	Sam Mackinnon	Sam Mackinnon
2005–06	1	NBL	11th	32	5	27	.156	Did not qualify	Mark Watkins	Scott McGregor	Clint Reed
2006–07	1	NBL	12th	33	5	28	.152	Did not qualify	Mark Watkins; Cal Bruton	Scott McGregor	James Harvey
2007–08	1	NBL	10th	30	10	20	.333	Did not qualify	Rob Beveridge	Liam Rush	Darnell Hinson
Sydney Spirit
2008–09	1	NBL	8th	30	11	19	.367	Did not qualify	Rob Beveridge	Jason Smith	Matthew Knight
Regular season record				332	127	205	.383	0 regular season champions			
Finals record				19	11	8	.579	0 NBL championships			

As of the end of the 2008–09 season

Source: West Sydney Razorbacks Year by Year
