= 2005–06 NBL season =

Professional basketball season

- League: National Basketball League
- Season: 2005–06
- Dates: 2 September 2005 – 28 February 2006
- Teams: 11
- TV partners: Australia: Fox Sports; New Zealand: Sky Sport

Regular season
- Season champions: Sydney Kings
- Season MVP: (Australia) Chris Anstey (Melbourne)

Finals
- Champions: Melbourne Tigers (3rd title)
- Runners-up: Sydney Kings
- Semifinalists: Cairns Taipans; Perth Wildcats
- Finals MVP: (Australia) Chris Anstey (Melbourne)

Statistical leaders
Points	(United States) Cortez Groves (Wollongong)	24.0
Rebounds	(United States) Larry Abney (Townsville)	11.3
Assists	(Australia) Darryl McDonald (Melbourne)	7.0

NBL seasons
- ← 2004–05 2006–07 →

The 2005–06 NBL season was the 28th season of competition since its establishment in 1979. A total of 11 teams contested the league.

== Regular season ==
The 2005–06 regular season took place over 23 rounds between 2 September 2005 to 5 February 2006.

=== Round 1 ===
Date	Home	Score	Away	Venue	Crowd	Boxscore
2/09/2005	West Sydney Razorbacks	97–111	Townsville Crocodiles	State Sports Centre	3,246	boxscore
2/09/2005	Adelaide 36ers	102–93	Perth Wildcats	Adelaide Arena	4,392	boxscore
3/09/2005	Melbourne Tigers	102–61	Wollongong Hawks	State Netball and Hockey Centre	2,636	boxscore
4/09/2005	New Zealand Breakers	104–126	Cairns Taipans	Trusts Stadium	2,315	boxscore

=== Round 2 ===
Date	Home	Score	Away	Venue	Crowd	Boxscore
8/09/2005	Wollongong Hawks	99–85	New Zealand Breakers	WIN Entertainment Centre	N/A	boxscore
10/09/2005	Sydney Kings	85–83	Wollongong Hawks	Sydney Entertainment Centre	3,889	boxscore
10/09/2005	Melbourne Tigers	115–105	Perth Wildcats	State Netball and Hockey Centre	2,753	boxscore
10/09/2005	West Sydney Razorbacks	124–104	New Zealand Breakers	State Sports Centre	N/A	boxscore
11/09/2005	Cairns Taipans	105–90	Townsville Crocodiles	Cairns Convention Centre	4,190	boxscore

=== Round 3 ===
Date	Home	Score	Away	Venue	Crowd	Boxscore
14/09/2005	Brisbane Bullets	108–97	New Zealand Breakers	Brisbane Convention Centre	3,061	boxscore
14/09/2005	Hunter Pirates	98–86	Sydney Kings	Newcastle Entertainment Centre	1,837	boxscore
16/09/2005	Townsville Crocodiles	108–100	Adelaide 36ers	Townsville Entertainment Centre	5,257	boxscore
16/09/2005	West Sydney Razorbacks	78–104	Perth Wildcats	State Sports Centre	N/A	boxscore
17/09/2005	Sydney Kings	112–101	Brisbane Bullets	Sydney Entertainment Centre	3,533	boxscore
17/09/2005	Wollongong Hawks	101–105	West Sydney Razorbacks	WIN Entertainment Centre	2,769	boxscore
18/09/2005	New Zealand Breakers	112–94	Hunter Pirates	Trusts Stadium	1,790	boxscore
18/09/2005	Cairns Taipans	90–92	Adelaide 36ers	Cairns Convention Centre	N/A	boxscore
18/09/2005	Perth Wildcats	108–124	Townsville Crocodiles	Challenge Stadium	4,037	boxscore
18/09/2005	Brisbane Bullets	83–85	Melbourne Tigers	Brisbane Convention Centre	N/A	boxscore

=== Round 4 ===
Date	Home	Score	Away	Venue	Crowd	Boxscore
21/09/2005	Sydney Kings	118–85	Hunter Pirates	Sydney Entertainment Centre	3,188	boxscore
23/09/2005	Townsville Crocodiles	122–113	New Zealand Breakers	Townsville Entertainment Centre	5,057	boxscore
23/09/2005	Wollongong Hawks	100–93	Brisbane Bullets	WIN Entertainment Centre	3,584	boxscore
23/09/2005	Adelaide 36ers	99–94	Sydney Kings	Adelaide Arena	5,122	boxscore
25/09/2005	Cairns Taipans	117–95	New Zealand Breakers	Cairns Convention Centre	N/A	boxscore
25/09/2005	Perth Wildcats	73–91	Melbourne Tigers	Challenge Stadium	4,178	boxscore

=== Round 5 ===
Date	Home	Score	Away	Venue	Crowd	Boxscore
28/09/2005	Townsville Crocodiles	107–116	Brisbane Bullets	Townsville Entertainment Centre	4,913	boxscore
30/09/2005	Hunter Pirates	104–115	Perth Wildcats	Newcastle Entertainment Centre	1,836	boxscore
1/10/2005	Melbourne Tigers	88–95	Sydney Kings	State Netball and Hockey Centre	3,500	boxscore
1/10/2005	Adelaide 36ers	109–108	Cairns Taipans	Adelaide Arena	4,850	boxscore
1/10/2005	Wollongong Hawks	105–91	Perth Wildcats	WIN Entertainment Centre	3,375	boxscore
2/10/2005	New Zealand Breakers	109–102	West Sydney Razorbacks	Trusts Stadium	2,340	boxscore
3/10/2005	Sydney Kings	128–94	Townsville Crocodiles	Sydney Entertainment Centre	3,688	boxscore

=== Round 6 ===
Date	Home	Score	Away	Venue	Crowd	Boxscore
5/10/2005	Adelaide 36ers	94–92	Melbourne Tigers	Adelaide Arena	N/A	boxscore
5/10/2005	Hunter Pirates	104–99	Townsville Crocodiles	Newcastle Entertainment Centre	1,693	boxscore
7/10/2005	Perth Wildcats	87–95	Cairns Taipans	Challenge Stadium	N/A	boxscore
8/10/2005	Brisbane Bullets	116–87	Hunter Pirates	Brisbane Convention Centre	N/A	boxscore
8/10/2005	West Sydney Razorbacks	106–107	Adelaide 36ers	State Sports Centre	2,381	boxscore
8/10/2005	Melbourne Tigers	97–72	Townsville Crocodiles	State Netball and Hockey Centre	2,847	boxscore
9/10/2005	New Zealand Breakers	86–77	Wollongong Hawks	Trusts Stadium	2,346	boxscore
9/10/2005	Cairns Taipans	104–83	Hunter Pirates	Cairns Convention Centre	N/A	boxscore

=== Round 7 ===
Date	Home	Score	Away	Venue	Crowd	Boxscore
12/10/2005	West Sydney Razorbacks	112–101	Cairns Taipans	State Sports Centre	1,876	boxscore
14/10/2005	Adelaide 36ers	113–103	Wollongong Hawks	Adelaide Arena	5,375	boxscore
15/10/2005	Perth Wildcats	92–75	Hunter Pirates	Challenge Stadium	4,107	boxscore
15/10/2005	Sydney Kings	116–104	Melbourne Tigers	Sydney Entertainment Centre	4,301	boxscore
15/10/2005	Brisbane Bullets	105–94	Townsville Crocodiles	Brisbane Convention & Exhibition Centre	3,427	boxscore
16/10/2005	West Sydney Razorbacks	86–112	Melbourne Tigers	State Sports Centre	N/A	boxscore

=== Round 8 ===
Date	Home	Score	Away	Venue	Crowd	Boxscore
19/10/2005	Townsville Crocodiles	93–119	Hunter Pirates	Townsville Entertainment Centre	4,667	boxscore
19/10/2005	Perth Wildcats	100–93	Melbourne Tigers	Challenge Stadium	3,900	boxscore
19/10/2005	New Zealand Breakers	94–121	Adelaide 36ers	Trusts Stadium	2,712	boxscore
22/10/2005	Melbourne Tigers	94–85	Brisbane Bullets	State Netball and Hockey Centre	N/A	boxscore
22/10/2005	Wollongong Hawks	96–99	Sydney Kings	WIN Entertainment Centre	4,537	boxscore
23/10/2005	Perth Wildcats	113–92	West Sydney Razorbacks	Challenge Stadium	3,552	boxscore
23/10/2005	Sydney Kings	106–88	New Zealand Breakers	Sydney Entertainment Centre	3,274	boxscore
23/10/2005	Cairns Taipans	85–101	Hunter Pirates	Cairns Convention Centre	N/A	boxscore
23/10/2005	Adelaide 36ers	90–89	Brisbane Bullets	Adelaide Arena	N/A	boxscore

=== Round 9 ===
Date	Home	Score	Away	Venue	Crowd	Boxscore
26/10/2005	West Sydney Razorbacks	77–106	Melbourne Tigers	State Sports Centre	1,875	boxscore
28/10/2005	Perth Wildcats	121–100	Adelaide 36ers	Challenge Stadium	N/A	boxscore
28/10/2005	Cairns Taipans	86–94	Wollongong Hawks	Cairns Convention Centre	N/A	boxscore
28/10/2005	Hunter Pirates	85–83	Brisbane Bullets	Newcastle Entertainment Centre	2,242	boxscore
29/10/2005	Sydney Kings	106–74	West Sydney Razorbacks	Sydney Entertainment Centre	4,357	boxscore
29/10/2005	Townsville Crocodiles	97–101	Wollongong Hawks	Townsville Entertainment Centre	4,943	boxscore
30/10/2005	Melbourne Tigers	109–91	Hunter Pirates	State Netball and Hockey Centre	2,689	boxscore
30/10/2005	Brisbane Bullets	93–104	Perth Wildcats	Brisbane Convention Centre	3,391	boxscore
30/10/2005	Adelaide 36ers	122–101	New Zealand Breakers	Adelaide Arena	N/A	boxscore

=== Round 10 ===
Date	Home	Score	Away	Venue	Crowd	Boxscore
2/11/2005	Sydney Kings	124–91	Perth Wildcats	Sydney Entertainment Centre	3,068	boxscore
4/11/2005	Brisbane Bullets	115–129	Cairns Taipans	Brisbane Convention Centre	N/A	boxscore
4/11/2005	West Sydney Razorbacks	123–73	New Zealand Breakers	State Sports Centre	3,108	boxscore
5/11/2005	Adelaide 36ers	100–92	West Sydney Razorbacks	Adelaide Arena	N/A	boxscore
5/11/2005	Hunter Pirates	90–98	Cairns Taipans	Newcastle Entertainment Centre	2,136	boxscore
5/11/2005	Townsville Crocodiles	95–99	Melbourne Tigers	Townsville Entertainment Centre	5,039	boxscore
5/11/2005	Perth Wildcats	92–119	Wollongong Hawks	Challenge Stadium	N/A	boxscore
6/11/2005	New Zealand Breakers	97–103	Brisbane Bullets	Trusts Stadium	2,700	boxscore

=== Round 11 ===
Date	Home	Score	Away	Venue	Crowd	Boxscore
9/11/2005	Wollongong Hawks	112–95	Adelaide 36ers	WIN Entertainment Centre	3,500	boxscore
11/11/2005	Townsville Crocodiles	115–99	Cairns Taipans	Townsville Entertainment Centre	5,257	boxscore
11/11/2005	West Sydney Razorbacks	105–114	Hunter Pirates	State Sports Centre	2,886	boxscore
12/11/2005	Perth Wildcats	103–96	Brisbane Bullets	Singapore Indoor Stadium	8,000	boxscore
12/11/2005	Melbourne Tigers	115–103	Adelaide 36ers	State Netball and Hockey Centre	3,500	boxscore
12/11/2005	Hunter Pirates	96–116	Wollongong Hawks	Newcastle Entertainment Centre	2,056	boxscore
12/11/2005	New Zealand Breakers	113–130	Sydney Kings	TelstraClear Pacific Events Centre	1,867	boxscore
13/11/2005	Cairns Taipans	92–78	West Sydney Razorbacks	Cairns Convention Centre	3,057	boxscore

=== Round 12 ===
Date	Home	Score	Away	Venue	Crowd	Boxscore
16/11/2005	Adelaide 36ers	102–95	Townsville Crocodiles	Adelaide Arena	N/A	boxscore
17/11/2005	Sydney Kings	94–90	Townsville Crocodiles	Sydney Entertainment Centre	N/A	boxscore
18/11/2005	New Zealand Breakers	93–109	Perth Wildcats	Trusts Stadium	1,356	boxscore
19/11/2005	West Sydney Razorbacks	90–94	Sydney Kings	Sydney Super Dome	4,509	boxscore
19/11/2005	Melbourne Tigers	97–88	Cairns Taipans	State Netball and Hockey Centre	N/A	boxscore
20/11/2005	Brisbane Bullets	129–84	West Sydney Razorbacks	Brisbane Convention Centre	N/A	boxscore
20/11/2005	Wollongong Hawks	105–99	Townsville Crocodiles	WIN Entertainment Centre	3,398	boxscore
20/11/2005	New Zealand Breakers	74–95	Perth Wildcats	TelstraClear Pacific Events Centre	1,264	boxscore
20/11/2005	Hunter Pirates	102–104	Adelaide 36ers	Newcastle Entertainment Centre	1,698	boxscore

=== Round 13 ===
Date	Home	Score	Away	Venue	Crowd	Boxscore
23/11/2005	Cairns Taipans	94–87	Brisbane Bullets	Cairns Convention Centre	N/A	boxscore
23/11/2005	Melbourne Tigers	103–88	New Zealand Breakers	State Netball and Hockey Centre	N/A	boxscore
25/11/2005	Perth Wildcats	82–93	Sydney Kings	Challenge Stadium	N/A	boxscore
26/11/2005	West Sydney Razorbacks	91–115	Wollongong Hawks	State Sports Centre	2,622	boxscore
26/11/2005	Townsville Crocodiles	119–115	Brisbane Bullets	Townsville Entertainment Centre	N/A	boxscore
26/11/2005	Adelaide 36ers	109–92	Melbourne Tigers	Adelaide Arena	5,487	boxscore
27/11/2005	Hunter Pirates	117–102	New Zealand Breakers	Newcastle Entertainment Centre	1,788	boxscore
27/11/2005	Wollongong Hawks	93–94	Cairns Taipans	WIN Entertainment Centre	3,000	boxscore

=== Round 14 ===
Date	Home	Score	Away	Venue	Crowd	Boxscore
30/11/2005	Brisbane Bullets	130–109	Adelaide 36ers	Brisbane Convention Centre	N/A	boxscore
2/12/2005	Cairns Taipans	98–121	Sydney Kings	Cairns Convention Centre	N/A	boxscore
2/12/2005	Hunter Pirates	101–91	West Sydney Razorbacks	Newcastle Entertainment Centre	N/A	boxscore
2/12/2005	Adelaide 36ers	104–98	Perth Wildcats	Adelaide Arena	4,783	boxscore
3/12/2005	Melbourne Tigers	117–106	Perth Wildcats	State Netball and Hockey Centre	2,720	boxscore
3/12/2005	Wollongong Hawks	103–85	Hunter Pirates	WIN Entertainment Centre	3,464	boxscore
3/12/2005	Townsville Crocodiles	128–131	Sydney Kings	Townsville Entertainment Centre	4,909	boxscore
3/12/2005	West Sydney Razorbacks	103–107	Brisbane Bullets	State Sports Centre	1,100	boxscore

=== Round 15 ===
Date	Home	Score	Away	Venue	Crowd	Boxscore
7/12/2005	Brisbane Bullets	110–107	Cairns Taipans	Brisbane Convention Centre	N/A	boxscore
9/12/2005	Hunter Pirates	108–90	Cairns Taipans	Newcastle Entertainment Centre	1,557	boxscore
9/12/2005	Sydney Kings	122–95	Perth Wildcats	Sydney Entertainment Centre	4,385	boxscore
10/12/2005	Adelaide 36ers	96–109	Sydney Kings	Adelaide Arena	5,756	boxscore
10/12/2005	Townsville Crocodiles	118–128	Wollongong Hawks	Townsville Entertainment Centre	4,984	boxscore
10/12/2005	Melbourne Tigers	106–99	Hunter Pirates	State Netball and Hockey Centre	2,643	boxscore
10/12/2005	West Sydney Razorbacks	94–103	Perth Wildcats	State Sports Centre	2,249	boxscore
11/12/2005	New Zealand Breakers	107–117	Brisbane Bullets	TelstraClear Pacific Events Centre	1,124	boxscore
11/12/2005	Cairns Taipans	120–104	Wollongong Hawks	Cairns Convention Centre	N/A	boxscore

=== Round 16 ===
Date	Home	Score	Away	Venue	Crowd	Boxscore
14/12/2005	Hunter Pirates	102–121	Melbourne Tigers	Newcastle Entertainment Centre	2,001	boxscore
16/12/2005	Townsville Crocodiles	122–100	West Sydney Razorbacks	Townsville Entertainment Centre	4,843	boxscore
16/12/2005	Wollongong Hawks	96–93	Adelaide 36ers	WIN Entertainment Centre	3,622	boxscore
17/12/2005	Cairns Taipans	97–84	West Sydney Razorbacks	Cairns Convention Centre	N/A	boxscore
17/12/2005	Adelaide 36ers	102–114	Hunter Pirates	Adelaide Arena	N/A	boxscore
17/12/2005	Melbourne Tigers	108–99	Sydney Kings	State Netball and Hockey Centre	3,500	boxscore
17/12/2005	Perth Wildcats	115–93	Brisbane Bullets	Challenge Stadium	N/A	boxscore
18/12/2005	New Zealand Breakers	109–98	Wollongong Hawks	Trusts Stadium	2,039	boxscore

=== Round 17 ===
Date	Home	Score	Away	Venue	Crowd	Boxscore
21/12/2005	Melbourne Tigers	111–104	Adelaide 36ers	Derwent Entertainment Centre	N/A	boxscore
21/12/2005	Hunter Pirates	96–85	West Sydney Razorbacks	Newcastle Entertainment Centre	1,622	boxscore
23/12/2005	Melbourne Tigers	102–89	Wollongong Hawks	State Netball and Hockey Centre	2,650	boxscore
23/12/2005	Sydney Kings	133–89	Adelaide 36ers	Sydney Entertainment Centre	3,869	boxscore
23/12/2005	New Zealand Breakers	118–103	Cairns Taipans	North Shore Events Centre	1,842	boxscore
23/12/2005	Brisbane Bullets	128–90	Townsville Crocodiles	Brisbane Convention Centre	3,350	boxscore

=== Round 18 ===
Date	Home	Score	Away	Venue	Crowd	Boxscore
30/12/2005	Cairns Taipans	93–88	Perth Wildcats	Cairns Convention Centre	N/A	boxscore
30/12/2005	Wollongong Hawks	136–97	Brisbane Bullets	WIN Entertainment Centre	3,727	boxscore
30/12/2005	Sydney Kings	109–92	West Sydney Razorbacks	Sydney Entertainment Centre	3,842	boxscore
31/12/2005	New Zealand Breakers	82–105	Hunter Pirates	Trusts Stadium	N/A	boxscore
31/12/2005	Adelaide 36ers	87–73	West Sydney Razorbacks	Adelaide Arena	N/A	boxscore
31/12/2005	Townsville Crocodiles	106–105	Perth Wildcats	Townsville Entertainment Centre	N/A	boxscore

=== Round 19 ===
Date	Home	Score	Away	Venue	Crowd	Boxscore
4/01/2006	Wollongong Hawks	116–113	Perth Wildcats	WIN Entertainment Centre	3,802	boxscore
4/01/2006	Brisbane Bullets	121–108	Sydney Kings	Brisbane Convention Centre	3,500	boxscore
6/01/2006	Townsville Crocodiles	106–120	New Zealand Breakers	Townsville Entertainment Centre	5,026	boxscore
6/01/2006	Brisbane Bullets	93–118	Melbourne Tigers	Brisbane Convention & Exhibition Centre	N/A	boxscore
7/01/2006	Hunter Pirates	95–107	Brisbane Bullets	Newcastle Entertainment Centre	3,539	boxscore
7/01/2006	Sydney Kings	114–103	Wollongong Hawks	Sydney Entertainment Centre	4,414	boxscore
7/01/2006	Melbourne Tigers	118–92	West Sydney Razorbacks	State Netball and Hockey Centre	3,500	boxscore
7/01/2006	Cairns Taipans	102–96	Townsville Crocodiles	Cairns Convention Centre	4,055	boxscore
8/01/2006	Perth Wildcats	98–87	New Zealand Breakers	Challenge Stadium	N/A	boxscore

=== Round 20 ===
Date	Home	Score	Away	Venue	Crowd	Boxscore
11/01/2006	Adelaide 36ers	100–91	New Zealand Breakers	Adelaide Arena	N/A	boxscore
13/01/2006	Sydney Kings	123–96	Brisbane Bullets	Sydney Entertainment Centre	4,331	boxscore
13/01/2006	Wollongong Hawks	111–93	Hunter Pirates	WIN Entertainment Centre	3,769	boxscore
13/01/2006	Townsville Crocodiles	100–103	Melbourne Tigers	Townsville Entertainment Centre	5,138	boxscore
14/01/2006	Cairns Taipans	110–104	Melbourne Tigers	Cairns Convention Centre	3,886	boxscore
14/01/2006	Perth Wildcats	100–116	Adelaide 36ers	Challenge Stadium	3,700	boxscore
14/01/2006	Brisbane Bullets	115–103	New Zealand Breakers	Brisbane Convention Centre	N/A	boxscore
15/01/2006	Hunter Pirates	96–134	Sydney Kings	Newcastle Entertainment Centre	3,058	boxscore
15/01/2006	West Sydney Razorbacks	59–80	Wollongong Hawks	State Sports Centre	2,572	boxscore

=== Round 21 ===
Date	Home	Score	Away	Venue	Crowd	Boxscore
18/01/2006	West Sydney Razorbacks	117–102	Townsville Crocodiles	State Sports Centre	N/A	boxscore
20/01/2006	Sydney Kings	93–83	Cairns Taipans	Sydney Entertainment Centre	3,758	boxscore
21/01/2006	Adelaide 36ers	111–91	Hunter Pirates	Adelaide Arena	6,149	boxscore
21/01/2006	New Zealand Breakers	116–112	Townsville Crocodiles	Trusts Stadium	N/A	boxscore
21/01/2006	Wollongong Hawks	92–98	Sydney Kings	WIN Entertainment Centre	5,837	boxscore
21/01/2006	Brisbane Bullets	111–100	West Sydney Razorbacks	Brisbane Convention Centre	3,043	boxscore
22/01/2006	Perth Wildcats	91–81	Cairns Taipans	Challenge Stadium	N/A	boxscore

=== Round 22 ===
Date	Home	Score	Away	Venue	Crowd	Boxscore
25/01/2006	Melbourne Tigers	95–88	Cairns Taipans	State Netball and Hockey Centre	3,500	boxscore
27/01/2006	Townsville Crocodiles	101–93	Adelaide 36ers	Townsville Entertainment Centre	4,823	boxscore
27/01/2006	Brisbane Bullets	111–108	Wollongong Hawks	Brisbane Convention & Exhibition Centre	N/A	boxscore
27/01/2006	Hunter Pirates	98–116	New Zealand Breakers	Newcastle Entertainment Centre	2,322	boxscore
28/01/2006	Cairns Taipans	103–79	Adelaide 36ers	Cairns Convention Centre	4,220	boxscore
28/01/2006	Wollongong Hawks	94–91	Melbourne Tigers	WIN Entertainment Centre	3,676	boxscore
28/01/2006	West Sydney Razorbacks	99–110	Sydney Kings	Sydney Super Dome	3,623	boxscore
29/01/2006	Perth Wildcats	117–84	Townsville Crocodiles	Marrara Indoor Stadium	1,481	boxscore
29/01/2006	Sydney Kings	104–115	New Zealand Breakers	Sydney Entertainment Centre	3,575	boxscore

=== Round 23 ===
Date	Home	Score	Away	Venue	Crowd	Boxscore
1/02/2006	New Zealand Breakers	93–109	Melbourne Tigers	Trusts Stadium	N/A	boxscore
1/02/2006	Hunter Pirates	109–104	Townsville Crocodiles	Newcastle Entertainment Centre	2,078	boxscore
3/02/2006	Townsville Crocodiles	90–107	Cairns Taipans	Townsville Entertainment Centre	5,047	boxscore
4/02/2006	New Zealand Breakers	94–108	Melbourne Tigers	Trusts Stadium	N/A	boxscore
4/02/2006	Cairns Taipans	107–84	Sydney Kings	Cairns Convention Centre	N/A	boxscore
4/02/2006	Wollongong Hawks	90–89	West Sydney Razorbacks	WIN Entertainment Centre	3,917	boxscore
4/02/2006	Brisbane Bullets	120–77	Adelaide 36ers	Brisbane Convention Centre	N/A	boxscore
5/02/2006	Perth Wildcats	112–89	Hunter Pirates	Challenge Stadium	3,800	boxscore

== Ladder ==
Pos	2005–06 NBL season											
Pos	Team	Pld	W	L	PCT	Last 5	Streak	Home	Away	PF	PA	PP
1	Sydney Kings	32	26	6	81.25%	3–2	L2	15–1	11–5	3472	3094	112.22%
2	Melbourne Tigers	32	25	7	78.13%	3–2	W2	15–1	10–6	3305	2984	110.76%
3	Wollongong Hawks^{1}	32	19	13	59.38%	3–2	W2	12–4	7–9	3231	3101	104.19%
4	Adelaide 36ers^{1}	32	19	13	59.38%	2–3	L3	14–2	5–11	3222	3277	98.32%
5	Cairns Taipans	32	18	14	56.25%	3–2	W3	12–4	6–10	3200	3107	102.99%
6	Brisbane Bullets	32	17	15	53.13%	4–1	W4	12–4	5–11	3373	3280	102.84%
7	Perth Wildcats	32	16	16	50.00%	4–1	W3	10–5	5–10	3219	3168	101.61%
8	Hunter Pirates	32	13	19	40.63%	1–4	L1	8–8	5–11	3126	3315	94.30%
9	New Zealand Breakers^{2}	32	9	23	28.13%	3–2	L2	6–10	3–13	3179	3471	91.59%
10	Townsville Crocodiles^{2}	32	9	23	28.13%	1–4	L3	7–9	2–14	3283	3483	94.26%
11	West Sydney Razorbacks	32	5	27	15.63%	1–4	L3	4–12	1–15	2994	3324	90.07%

Updated to match(es) played on 5 February 2006. Source: NBL.com.au

The NBL tie-breaker system as outlined in the NBL Rules and Regulations states that in the case of an identical win–loss record, the results in games played between the teams will determine order of seeding.

^{1}Wollongong Hawks won Head-to-Head (2-1).

^{2}New Zealand Breakers won Head-to-Head (2-1).

== Finals ==
=== Playoff bracket ===
Elimination Finals
5	Cairns Taipans	88
8	Hunter Pirates	80
6	Brisbane Bullets	91
7	Perth Wildcats	96

Quarterfinals
4	Adelaide 36ers	103
5	Cairns Taipans	106
3	Wollongong Hawks	101
7	Perth Wildcats	121

Semifinals
1	Sydney Kings	112	84	X
5	Cairns Taipans	87	82	X
2	Melbourne Tigers	94	106	X
7	Perth Wildcats	78	101	X

Grand Final
1	Sydney Kings	93	99	83	X	X
2	Melbourne Tigers	100	103	88	X	X

=== Elimination Finals ===
Date	Home	Score	Away	Venue	Crowd	Boxscore
8/02/2006	Brisbane Bullets	91–96	Perth Wildcats	Brisbane Convention Centre	3,996	boxscore
9/02/2006	Cairns Taipans	88–80	Hunter Pirates	Cairns Convention Centre	4,726	boxscore
10/02/2006	Wollongong Hawks	101–121	Perth Wildcats	WIN Entertainment Centre	3,345	boxscore
11/02/2006	Adelaide 36ers	103–106 (OT)	Cairns Taipans	Adelaide Arena	5,492	boxscore

=== Semi-finals ===
Date	Home	Score	Away	Venue	Crowd	Boxscore
14/02/2006	Melbourne Tigers	94–78	Perth Wildcats	State Netball and Hockey Centre	3,107	boxscore
15/02/2006	Sydney Kings	112–87	Cairns Taipans	Sydney Entertainment Centre	3,192	boxscore
16/02/2006	Perth Wildcats	101–106	Melbourne Tigers	Challenge Stadium	4,400	boxscore
17/02/2006	Cairns Taipans	82–84	Sydney Kings	Cairns Convention Centre	4,852	boxscore

=== Grand Final ===
Date	Home	Score	Away	Venue	Crowd	Boxscore
24/02/2006	Sydney Kings	93–100	Melbourne Tigers	Sydney Entertainment Centre	5,890	boxscore
26/02/2006	Melbourne Tigers	103–99	Sydney Kings	State Netball and Hockey Centre	3,500	boxscore
28/02/2006	Sydney Kings	83–88	Melbourne Tigers	Sydney Entertainment Centre	5,561	boxscore

== All Star Game ==
Fox Sports

23 December 2005
18:30

boxscore
report

Aussie All Stars	151–116	World All Stars
Scoring by quarter: 44–23, 28–27, 40–33, 39–33
Pts: Anstey 23; Rebs: Bradtke 14; Asts: McDonald 10		Pts: Groves 19; Rebs: Redhage, Rychart 13; Asts: Redhage, Rychart 5
Aussie All Stars win, 151–116

Sydney Entertainment Centre, Sydney
Attendance: 4,783

=== Most Valuable Player ===
- Darryl McDonald (Melbourne Tigers)

== Awards ==
The MVP was awarded to Chris Anstey of the Melbourne Tigers.

The Grand Final MVP was also awarded to Chris Anstey.

The Coach of the Year went to Alan Westover of the Melbourne Tigers who coached the team to the title.

The Rookie of the Year went to Mark Worthington of the Sydney Kings.

== All NBL Team ==
#	Player	Team
PG	Brett Maher	Adelaide 36ers
SG	C. J. Bruton	Sydney Kings
SF	Cortez Groves	Wollongong Hawks
PF	Larry Abney	Townsville Crocodiles
C	Chris Anstey	Melbourne Tigers
