= Bruce Bolden =

American-Australian basketball player (born 1963)

Personal information
- Born: November 30, 1963 (age 62) Jackson, Mississippi, U.S.
- Listed height: 6 ft 7 in (2.01 m)
- Listed weight: 231 lb (105 kg)

Career information
- High school: Flint Northwestern (Flint, Michigan)
- College: Boise State (1981–1985)
- NBA draft: 1985: undrafted
- Playing career: 1985–2004
- Position: Forward

Career history
- 1985: Ulriken Elite
- 1986: Gippsland Lakers
- 1987: Eastside Spectres
- 1988–1989: Westside Saints
- 1990–1991: Eastside Spectres
- 1992–1994: South East Melbourne Magic
- 1995–1998: Sydney Kings
- 1998–2003: West Sydney Razorbacks
- 2003–2004: Albury Wodonga Bandits

Career highlights
- NBL champion (1992); NBL Grand Final MVP (1992); 4× All-NBL Second Team (1990–1993); NBL Best Sixth Man (1999); No. 32 retired by the West Sydney Razorbacks

Bruce Anthony Bolden (born November 30, 1963) is an American-Australian former professional basketball player. He played 17 years in the National Basketball League (NBL) in Australia. He won an NBL championship with the South East Melbourne Magic in 1992, when he was named the NBL Grand Final Most Valuable Player (MVP). He led the league in rebounding in 1993, and he was also named the NBL Best Sixth Man in 1999. His final season was played in the Australian Basketball Association with the Albury Wodonga Bandits in 2003–04. His No. 32 was the first jersey to ever be retired by the West Sydney Razorbacks.

After retiring as a player, Bolden started MyHoops, a basketball coaching service in Australia for young players from 7 to 18 years old.

Bruce often appears as a guest on the Aussie Hoopla podcast where he provides his thoughts on how players can make it to an elite level and his views on basketball in Australia.

== Personal life ==
Bolden’s ex wife was Marie Yacoub. Their son, Jonah Bolden, played college basketball with the UCLA Bruins, played professionally in Serbia and in Israel for Maccabi Tel Aviv. Jonah was drafted in the second round as the 36th pick in the 2017 NBA draft by the Philadelphia 76ers.
