= Hunter Pirates =

Defunct basketball team from Newcastle, Australia

- Leagues: NBL
- Founded: 2003
- Dissolved: 2006
- History: Canberra Cannons; 1979–2003; Hunter Pirates; 2003–2006; Singapore Slingers; 2006–present
- Arena: Newcastle Entertainment Centre
- Location: Newcastle, New South Wales
- Team colors: Red, black, gold, white
- Championships: 0
Home	Away

The Hunter Pirates are a defunct Australian professional men's basketball team that competed in the National Basketball League (NBL). It was based in the city of Newcastle, New South Wales.

== Team history ==
The franchise began as the Canberra Cannons, one of the foundation members of the NBL. At the end of the 2002–03 season, new owners moved the team to Newcastle and renamed the franchise the Hunter Pirates. The Pirates played at the 4,658-seat Newcastle Entertainment Centre.

In its first season, 2003–04, the team came last, winning only two games. Initial coach Bruce Palmer was fired partway into the season and was replaced by assistant coach David Simmons.

In 2004–05, former Perth Wildcats, Australian Boomers and Australian Institute of Sport coach Dr. Adrian Hurley was appointed as the head coach and led the team to eighth place with a 15–17 record. In the playoffs, the Pirates were eliminated by the Brisbane Bullets in the opening round.

In 2005–06, the Pirates made the playoffs where they were beaten by the Cairns Taipans. Following their third season, the Pirates withdrew from the NBL due to financial difficulties and being unable to find a major sponsor.

In March 2006, the Singapore Slingers took over the Pirates' licence.

== Honour Roll ==
NBL Championships:	0
NBL Finals Appearances:	2 (2004/05, 2005/06)
NBL Grand Final appearances:	0
NBL Most Valuable Players:	Brian Wethers (2004/05)
All-NBL First Team:	Brian Wethers (2004/05)
All-NBL Third Team:	Kavossy Franklin (2004/05)
NBL Coach of the Year:	Adrian Hurley (2004/05)
NBL Most Improved Player:	Geordie Cullen (2003/04)
NBL Scoring Champion:	Brian Wethers (2004/05)

Source: www.nbl.com.au

== Season by season ==
NBL champions	League champions	Runners-up	Finals berth

Season	Tier	League	Regular season					Post-season	Head coach	Captain	Club MVP
Season	Tier	League	Finish	Played	Wins	Losses	Win %	Post-season	Head coach	Captain	Club MVP
Hunter Pirates
2003–04	1	NBL	12th	33	2	31	.061	Did not qualify	Bruce Palmer; Dave Simmons	Brendan Mann	Geordie Cullen
2004–05	1	NBL	8th	32	15	17	.469	Lost elimination final (Brisbane) 99–113	Adrian Hurley	Brendan Mann	Brian Wethers
2005–06	1	NBL	8th	32	13	19	.406	Lost elimination final (Cairns) 80–88	Adrian Hurley	Aaron Trahair	Mike Helms
Regular season record				97	30	67	.309	0 regular season champions			
Finals record				0	0	2	.000	0 NBL championships			

As of the end of the 2005–06 season

Source: Hunter Pirates Year by Year
