= Brian Wethers =

American basketball player (b.1980)

Personal information
- Born: December 17, 1980 (age 45) Carson, California, U.S.
- Listed height: 6 ft 5 in (1.96 m)
- Listed weight: 215 lb (98 kg)

Career information
- High school: Murrieta Valley (Murrieta, California)
- College: California (1999–2003)
- NBA draft: 2003: undrafted
- Playing career: 2003–2010
- Position: Shooting guard / small forward

Career history
- 2003: Energy Braunschweig
- 2003–2004: Shandong Lions
- 2004: St. Louis Skyhawks
- 2004–2005: Hunter Pirates
- 2005–2006: Hyères-Toulon
- 2006–2007: New Zealand Breakers
- 2007: Bakersfield Jam
- 2007: Zhejiang Golden Bulls
- 2008: Waikato Pistons
- 2008–2009: Budivelnyk
- 2009: Antranik
- 2009–2010: Club Malvín
- 2010: Khimik Yuzhny
- 2010: Namika Lahti

Career highlights
- NZNBL champion (2008); NZNBL All-Star Five (2008); NZNBL scoring champion (2008); NBL Most Valuable Player (2005); All-NBL First Team (2005); NBL scoring champion (2005)

Brian Augustus Wethers (born December 17, 1980) is an American former professional basketball player. Wethers primarily played the small forward or shooting guard position. This career ended with a foot injury.

== Basketball career ==
=== High school ===
Wethers graduated from Murrieta Valley High School in 1999.

=== College basketball ===
Wethers attended college at the University of California, Berkeley.

=== Professional career ===
After college, Wethers tore an Achilles tendon during a tryout for the Golden State Warriors.

Wethers played for Phantoms Braunschweig in Germany and Shandong in China in the 2003–2004 season.

He moved in 2004 to the Hunter Pirates in the Australian National Basketball League. Wethers was a standout for the Pirates during the 2004–2005 NBL season leading the league in scoring with 24.3 points a game and being named the NBL MVP. Wethers' strong play took the Pirates to the playoffs, after they had previously only won 2 matches the season before.

After the end of the NBL season Wethers moved to Hyères-Toulon in France where he played 24 matches during the 2005–2006 season.

He returned to the NBL in 2006 signing for the New Zealand Breakers, who had struggled in the league since their inception in 2003–2004.

Wethers was a fourth round selection in the 2007 NBA Development League Draft by the Bakersfield Jam, however he only played two matches before being released.

He moved to Ukraine in 2008, signing with BC Budivelnyk Kyiv.

In 2008 Wethers spent time at the Waikato Pistons in the New Zealand National Basketball League.

In 2009, he played for Antranik SC in Lebanon before in late 2009 moving to Uruguay to play for Club Malvín.

Wethers was signed in March 2010 to Khimik Yuzhny.

=== Post basketball career ===
Wethers is now the owner of Wethers' Elite Training. The company provides private training, camps, clinics, and travel team opportunities for boys and girls.
