= 2003–04 NBL season =

Professional basketball season

- League: National Basketball League
- Season: 2003–04
- Dates: 1 October 2003 – 6 April 2004
- Teams: 12
- TV partners: Australia: Fox Sports; New Zealand: Sky Sport

Regular season
- Season champions: Sydney Kings
- Season MVP: (Australia) Matthew Nielsen (Sydney)

Finals
- Champions: Sydney Kings (2nd title)
- Runners-up: West Sydney Razorbacks
- Semi-finalists: Wollongong Hawks; Brisbane Bullets
- Finals MVP: (Australia) Matthew Nielsen (Sydney)

Statistical leaders
Points	(Australia) Matthew Nielsen (Sydney)	23.5
Rebounds	(Australia) Mark Bradtke (Melbourne)	10.9
Assists	(Australia) Ricky Grace (Perth)	7.3

NBL seasons
- ← 2002–03 2004–05 →

The 2003–04 NBL season was the 26th season of competition since its establishment in 1979. A total of 12 teams contested the league. This season marked the first NBL season that featured the New Zealand Breakers, the first New Zealand team in the Australian competition. Also, the Canberra Cannons were replaced by the Hunter Pirates.

== Regular season ==
The 2003–04 regular season took place over 22 rounds between 1 October 2003 and 29 February 2004.

=== Round 1 ===
Date	Home	Score	Away	Venue	Crowd	Boxscore
1/10/2003	New Zealand Breakers	111–110	Adelaide 36ers	North Shore Events Centre	3,650	boxscore
1/10/2003	Townsville Crocodiles	114–118	Cairns Taipans	Townsville Entertainment Centre	5,257	boxscore
1/10/2003	Hunter Pirates	77–105	Melbourne Tigers	Newcastle Entertainment Centre	3,882	boxscore
3/10/2003	Melbourne Tigers	97–88	Brisbane Bullets	State Netball and Hockey Centre	2,772	boxscore
3/10/2003	Cairns Taipans	84–73	New Zealand Breakers	Cairns Convention Centre	5,332	boxscore
4/10/2003	Victoria Giants	96–106	Brisbane Bullets	Melbourne Sports & Aquatic Centre	1,600	boxscore
4/10/2003	West Sydney Razorbacks	119–103	Hunter Pirates	State Sports Centre	2,735	boxscore
4/10/2003	Perth Wildcats	95–114	Sydney Kings	Challenge Stadium	4,087	boxscore

=== Round 2 ===
Date	Home	Score	Away	Venue	Crowd	Boxscore
6/10/2003	Wollongong Hawks	131–108	Hunter Pirates	WIN Entertainment Centre	4,286	boxscore
8/10/2003	Adelaide 36ers	86–101	Cairns Taipans	Adelaide Arena	5,589	boxscore
8/10/2003	Perth Wildcats	99–116	Melbourne Tigers	Challenge Stadium	3,261	boxscore
8/10/2003	Brisbane Bullets	105–97	West Sydney Razorbacks	Brisbane Convention & Exhibition Centre	2,008	boxscore
10/10/2003	Townsville Crocodiles	100–107	West Sydney Razorbacks	Townsville Entertainment Centre	5,112	boxscore
11/10/2003	Victoria Giants	100–94	Cairns Taipans	Melbourne Sports & Aquatic Centre	1,002	boxscore
11/10/2003	Wollongong Hawks	108–78	New Zealand Breakers	WIN Entertainment Centre	3,669	boxscore

=== Round 3 ===
Date	Home	Score	Away	Venue	Crowd	Boxscore
15/10/2003	Townsville Crocodiles	98–94	Adelaide 36ers	Townsville Entertainment Centre	5,011	boxscore
15/10/2003	West Sydney Razorbacks	101–90	Melbourne Tigers	State Sports Centre	2,289	boxscore
18/10/2003	Sydney Kings	107–97	Perth Wildcats	Sydney Entertainment Centre	6,068	boxscore
18/10/2003	Brisbane Bullets	97–98	Adelaide 36ers	Brisbane Convention & Exhibition Centre	2,616	boxscore
18/10/2003	Victoria Giants	118–102	Hunter Pirates	Melbourne Sports & Aquatic Centre	1,363	boxscore
18/10/2003	Cairns Taipans	81–103	Wollongong Hawks	Cairns Convention Centre	4,480	boxscore
19/10/2003	New Zealand Breakers	97–108	Melbourne Tigers	North Shore Events Centre	2,100	boxscore

=== Round 4 ===
Date	Home	Score	Away	Venue	Crowd	Boxscore
22/10/2003	Sydney Kings	97–83	West Sydney Razorbacks	Sydney Entertainment Centre	3,935	boxscore
24/10/2003	Adelaide 36ers	134–105	New Zealand Breakers	Adelaide Arena	6,942	boxscore
24/10/2003	Hunter Pirates	80–118	Perth Wildcats	Newcastle Entertainment Centre	1,834	boxscore
24/10/2003	Brisbane Bullets	111–92	Townsville Crocodiles	Brisbane Convention & Exhibition Centre	2,600	boxscore
24/10/2003	Melbourne Tigers	76–105	Wollongong Hawks	State Netball and Hockey Centre	2,480	boxscore
25/10/2003	Victoria Giants	90–78	New Zealand Breakers	Melbourne Sports & Aquatic Centre	1,743	boxscore
26/10/2003	Wollongong Hawks	80–95	Sydney Kings	WIN Entertainment Centre	5,015	boxscore

=== Round 5 ===
Date	Home	Score	Away	Venue	Crowd	Boxscore
29/10/2003	Hunter Pirates	103–99	Adelaide 36ers	Newcastle Entertainment Centre	1,935	boxscore
29/10/2003	Townsville Crocodiles	108–81	Victoria Giants	Townsville Entertainment Centre	4,984	boxscore
31/10/2003	New Zealand Breakers	68–81	Cairns Taipans	Queens Wharf Events Centre	2,034	boxscore
31/10/2003	Sydney Kings	113–86	Townsville Crocodiles	Sydney Entertainment Centre	4,500	boxscore
31/10/2003	West Sydney Razorbacks	81–90	Wollongong Hawks	State Sports Centre	2,905	boxscore
1/11/2003	Perth Wildcats	118–105	Adelaide 36ers	Challenge Stadium	3,390	boxscore
1/11/2003	New Zealand Breakers	93–91	Cairns Taipans	North Shore Events Centre	1,466	boxscore
1/11/2003	Melbourne Tigers	117–96	Hunter Pirates	State Netball and Hockey Centre	2,556	boxscore
1/11/2003	Brisbane Bullets	118–78	Victoria Giants	Brisbane Convention & Exhibition Centre	2,425	boxscore

=== Round 6 ===
Date	Home	Score	Away	Venue	Crowd	Boxscore
5/11/2003	Sydney Kings	113–98	Adelaide 36ers	Sydney Entertainment Centre	3,517	boxscore
6/11/2003	West Sydney Razorbacks	95–99	Victoria Giants	Whitlam Centre	1,585	boxscore
7/11/2003	Hunter Pirates	90–121	Brisbane Bullets	Newcastle Entertainment Centre	2,200	boxscore
8/11/2003	Melbourne Tigers	111–99	Adelaide 36ers	State Netball and Hockey Centre	2,350	boxscore
8/11/2003	Wollongong Hawks	84–99	Brisbane Bullets	WIN Entertainment Centre	3,600	boxscore
8/11/2003	Cairns Taipans	68–83	Sydney Kings	Cairns Convention Centre	4,604	boxscore
8/11/2003	Victoria Giants	101–106	West Sydney Razorbacks	Melbourne Sports & Aquatic Centre	1,120	boxscore
9/11/2003	Townsville Crocodiles	106–118	Sydney Kings	Townsville Entertainment Centre	5,023	boxscore

=== Round 7 ===
Date	Home	Score	Away	Venue	Crowd	Boxscore
12/11/2003	Sydney Kings	90–69	Cairns Taipans	Sydney Entertainment Centre	3,673	boxscore
12/11/2003	New Zealand Breakers	84–90	Brisbane Bullets	Westpac Trust Centre	1,700	boxscore
12/11/2003	Adelaide 36ers	91–101	West Sydney Razorbacks	Adelaide Arena	4,648	boxscore
14/11/2003	Cairns Taipans	88–91	Townsville Crocodiles	Cairns Convention Centre	4,317	boxscore
14/11/2003	Victoria Giants	91–109	Wollongong Hawks	Melbourne Sports & Aquatic Centre	1,352	boxscore
15/11/2003	Brisbane Bullets	106–91	Perth Wildcats	Brisbane Convention & Exhibition Centre	2,573	boxscore
15/11/2003	Townsville Crocodiles	94–106	Sydney Kings	Townsville Entertainment Centre	5,257	boxscore
15/11/2003	Adelaide 36ers	103–93	Victoria Giants	Adelaide Arena	4,431	boxscore
15/11/2003	Hunter Pirates	95–102	West Sydney Razorbacks	Newcastle Entertainment Centre	1,950	boxscore
15/11/2003	Melbourne Tigers	78–84	Wollongong Hawks	State Netball and Hockey Centre	2,357	boxscore

=== Round 8 ===
Date	Home	Score	Away	Venue	Crowd	Boxscore
19/11/2003	Sydney Kings	86–88	Wollongong Hawks	Sydney Entertainment Centre	4,012	boxscore
21/11/2003	Adelaide 36ers	118–89	Melbourne Tigers	Adelaide Arena	5,095	boxscore
21/11/2003	Perth Wildcats	101–97	Cairns Taipans	Challenge Stadium	3,046	boxscore
21/11/2003	Victoria Giants	121–115	Townsville Crocodiles	Melbourne Sports & Aquatic Centre	1,180	boxscore
22/11/2003	New Zealand Breakers	95–103	West Sydney Razorbacks	North Shore Events Centre	1,721	boxscore
22/11/2003	Melbourne Tigers	95–90	Victoria Giants	State Netball and Hockey Centre	2,830	boxscore
22/11/2003	Wollongong Hawks	105–91	Townsville Crocodiles	WIN Entertainment Centre	2,500	boxscore
23/11/2003	Brisbane Bullets	77–95	Cairns Taipans	Southport Stadium	1,000	boxscore

=== Round 9 ===
Date	Home	Score	Away	Venue	Crowd	Boxscore
26/11/2003	New Zealand Breakers	96–137	Brisbane Bullets	Mystery Creek Events Centre	1,523	boxscore
26/11/2003	Hunter Pirates	71–101	Sydney Kings	Newcastle Entertainment Centre	1,890	boxscore
26/11/2003	Perth Wildcats	118–113	West Sydney Razorbacks	Challenge Stadium	2,970	boxscore
28/11/2003	Cairns Taipans	99–62	Hunter Pirates	Cairns Convention Centre	3,644	boxscore
28/11/2003	New Zealand Breakers	89–93	Wollongong Hawks	North Shore Events Centre	1,322	boxscore
29/11/2003	Adelaide 36ers	123–97	Perth Wildcats	Adelaide Arena	5,083	boxscore
29/11/2003	Melbourne Tigers	83–92	Sydney Kings	State Netball and Hockey Centre	2,805	boxscore
29/11/2003	West Sydney Razorbacks	124–104	Townsville Crocodiles	State Sports Centre	2,926	boxscore

=== Round 10 ===
Date	Home	Score	Away	Venue	Crowd	Boxscore
1/12/2003	Wollongong Hawks	121–103	Perth Wildcats	WIN Entertainment Centre	3,126	boxscore
3/12/2003	Brisbane Bullets	107–95	Victoria Giants	Brisbane Convention & Exhibition Centre	2,194	boxscore
3/12/2003	Adelaide 36ers	87–80	Wollongong Hawks	Adelaide Arena	5,500	boxscore
5/12/2003	Townsville Crocodiles	113–114	Adelaide 36ers	Townsville Entertainment Centre	5,025	boxscore
5/12/2003	Hunter Pirates	101–104	New Zealand Breakers	Newcastle Entertainment Centre	1,755	boxscore
5/12/2003	Melbourne Tigers	105–100	West Sydney Razorbacks	State Netball and Hockey Centre	2,120	boxscore
6/12/2003	Cairns Taipans	110–107	Adelaide 36ers	Cairns Convention Centre	3,631	boxscore
6/12/2003	West Sydney Razorbacks	80–82	New Zealand Breakers	Penrith Stadium	1,123	boxscore
6/12/2003	Wollongong Hawks	117–99	Sydney Kings	WIN Entertainment Centre	4,479	boxscore
6/12/2003	Perth Wildcats	90–104	Victoria Giants	Challenge Stadium	3,100	boxscore

=== Round 11 ===
Date	Home	Score	Away	Venue	Crowd	Boxscore
10/12/2003	Sydney Kings	87–97	West Sydney Razorbacks	Sydney Entertainment Centre	4,833	boxscore
10/12/2003	Townsville Crocodiles	117–100	Perth Wildcats	Townsville Entertainment Centre	4,975	boxscore
12/12/2003	Melbourne Tigers	78–75	New Zealand Breakers	State Netball and Hockey Centre	2,387	boxscore
12/12/2003	Cairns Taipans	100–72	Perth Wildcats	Cairns Convention Centre	3,953	boxscore
12/12/2003	Hunter Pirates	88–108	Sydney Kings	Newcastle Entertainment Centre	1,502	boxscore
12/12/2003	Brisbane Bullets	104–112	West Sydney Razorbacks	Brisbane Convention & Exhibition Centre	3,953	boxscore
13/12/2003	Victoria Giants	81–113	New Zealand Breakers	Melbourne Sports & Aquatic Centre	1,422	boxscore
13/12/2003	Adelaide 36ers	104–99	Townsville Crocodiles	Adelaide Arena	5,900	boxscore
14/12/2003	Wollongong Hawks	91–98	Cairns Taipans	WIN Entertainment Centre	3,425	boxscore

=== Round 12 ===
Date	Home	Score	Away	Venue	Crowd	Boxscore
17/12/2003	Brisbane Bullets	123–80	Hunter Pirates	Brisbane Convention & Exhibition Centre	2,007	boxscore
17/12/2003	New Zealand Breakers	98–83	Melbourne Tigers	North Shore Events Centre	2,426	boxscore
17/12/2003	Sydney Kings	115–82	Perth Wildcats	Sydney Entertainment Centre	4,183	boxscore
20/12/2003	Townsville Crocodiles	90–109	Brisbane Bullets	Townsville Entertainment Centre	5,096	boxscore
20/12/2003	West Sydney Razorbacks	99–84	Cairns Taipans	State Sports Centre	2,287	boxscore
20/12/2003	Perth Wildcats	98–86	New Zealand Breakers	Challenge Stadium	2,500	boxscore
20/12/2003	Adelaide 36ers	98–108	Sydney Kings	Adelaide Arena	6,352	boxscore
20/12/2003	Melbourne Tigers	100–72	Victoria Giants	State Netball and Hockey Centre	2,894	boxscore
20/12/2003	Hunter Pirates	88–100	Wollongong Hawks	Newcastle Entertainment Centre	1,675	boxscore

=== Round 13 ===
Date	Home	Score	Away	Venue	Crowd	Boxscore
27/12/2003	Perth Wildcats	104–97	Cairns Taipans	Challenge Stadium	2,300	boxscore
27/12/2003	Brisbane Bullets	124–107	Hunter Pirates	Brisbane Convention & Exhibition Centre	2,220	boxscore
27/12/2003	Wollongong Hawks	110–101	Melbourne Tigers	WIN Entertainment Centre	4,186	boxscore
27/12/2003	New Zealand Breakers	83–93	Sydney Kings	North Shore Events Centre	4,423	boxscore
27/12/2003	Victoria Giants	95–107	West Sydney Razorbacks	Melbourne Sports & Aquatic Centre	1,148	boxscore

=== Round 14 ===
Date	Home	Score	Away	Venue	Crowd	Boxscore
29/12/2003	Melbourne Tigers	85–113	Townsville Crocodiles	State Netball and Hockey Centre	2,170	boxscore
31/12/2003	Cairns Taipans	106–113	Brisbane Bullets	Cairns Convention Centre	5,352	boxscore
31/12/2003	Adelaide 36ers	93–86	Hunter Pirates	Adelaide Arena	6,465	boxscore
31/12/2003	Victoria Giants	116–111	Melbourne Tigers	Melbourne Sports & Aquatic Centre	1,807	boxscore
31/12/2003	Townsville Crocodiles	112–103	New Zealand Breakers	Townsville Entertainment Centre	5,257	boxscore
31/12/2003	West Sydney Razorbacks	100–87	Perth Wildcats	State Sports Centre	1,957	boxscore
2/01/2004	Wollongong Hawks	121–75	Adelaide 36ers	WIN Entertainment Centre	4,300	boxscore
2/01/2004	Brisbane Bullets	103–83	New Zealand Breakers	Brisbane Convention & Exhibition Centre	2,681	boxscore
3/01/2004	Victoria Giants	97–82	Adelaide 36ers	Melbourne Sports & Aquatic Centre	947	boxscore
3/01/2004	Hunter Pirates	109–103	Cairns Taipans	Newcastle Entertainment Centre	1,892	boxscore
3/01/2004	Sydney Kings	111–113	Melbourne Tigers	Sydney Entertainment Centre	5,318	boxscore
3/01/2004	Perth Wildcats	115–72	Townsville Crocodiles	Challenge Stadium	2,829	boxscore

=== Round 15 ===
Date	Home	Score	Away	Venue	Crowd	Boxscore
7/01/2004	Victoria Giants	108–115	Adelaide 36ers	Melbourne Sports & Aquatic Centre	2,200	boxscore
7/01/2004	Brisbane Bullets	108–101	Cairns Taipans	Brisbane Convention & Exhibition Centre	2,951	boxscore
9/01/2004	Townsville Crocodiles	126–101	Hunter Pirates	Townsville Entertainment Centre	5,098	boxscore
9/01/2004	Sydney Kings	109–99	New Zealand Breakers	Sydney Entertainment Centre	4,901	boxscore
9/01/2004	Wollongong Hawks	105–109	West Sydney Razorbacks	WIN Entertainment Centre	4,438	boxscore
10/01/2004	Adelaide 36ers	96–126	Brisbane Bullets	Adelaide Arena	5,680	boxscore
10/01/2004	Cairns Taipans	103–60	Hunter Pirates	Cairns Convention Centre	3,639	boxscore
10/01/2004	West Sydney Razorbacks	98–82	New Zealand Breakers	State Sports Centre	2,117	boxscore
10/01/2004	Melbourne Tigers	93–89	Sydney Kings	State Netball and Hockey Centre	3,423	boxscore
11/01/2004	Perth Wildcats	100–98	Wollongong Hawks	Challenge Stadium	2,981	boxscore

=== Round 16 ===
Date	Home	Score	Away	Venue	Crowd	Boxscore
14/01/2004	Wollongong Hawks	104–79	Cairns Taipans	WIN Entertainment Centre	3,580	boxscore
14/01/2004	Brisbane Bullets	105–98	Melbourne Tigers	Brisbane Convention & Exhibition Centre	3,060	boxscore
14/01/2004	New Zealand Breakers	93–79	Townsville Crocodiles	Westpac Trust Centre	2,017	boxscore
16/01/2004	Sydney Kings	118–101	Brisbane Bullets	Sydney Entertainment Centre	5,416	boxscore
16/01/2004	Cairns Taipans	100–87	Victoria Giants	Cairns Convention Centre	3,791	boxscore
17/01/2004	Hunter Pirates	110–115	Adelaide 36ers	Newcastle Entertainment Centre	2,180	boxscore
17/01/2004	West Sydney Razorbacks	94–82	Brisbane Bullets	State Sports Centre	3,123	boxscore
17/01/2004	Perth Wildcats	111–96	Melbourne Tigers	Burswood Dome	8,501	boxscore
17/01/2004	Victoria Giants	90–102	Sydney Kings	Melbourne Sports & Aquatic Centre	1,738	boxscore
17/01/2004	New Zealand Breakers	80–96	Townsville Crocodiles	North Shore Events Centre	2,055	boxscore

=== Round 17 ===
Date	Home	Score	Away	Venue	Crowd	Boxscore
21/01/2004	Cairns Taipans	103–107	Melbourne Tigers	Cairns Convention Centre	3,960	boxscore
21/01/2004	West Sydney Razorbacks	100–93	Perth Wildcats	State Sports Centre	2,157	boxscore
21/01/2004	Hunter Pirates	97–112	Townsville Crocodiles	Newcastle Entertainment Centre	2,205	boxscore
21/01/2004	Wollongong Hawks	109–79	Victoria Giants	WIN Entertainment Centre	3,610	boxscore
23/01/2004	Perth Wildcats	99–83	Brisbane Bullets	Challenge Stadium	3,308	boxscore
23/01/2004	Townsville Crocodiles	98–107	Wollongong Hawks	Townsville Entertainment Centre	N/A	boxscore
24/01/2004	Melbourne Tigers	97–89	Cairns Taipans	State Netball and Hockey Centre	2,959	boxscore
24/01/2004	New Zealand Breakers	110–100	Hunter Pirates	North Shore Events Centre	2,311	boxscore
24/01/2004	Adelaide 36ers	113–93	Sydney Kings	Adelaide Arena	6,432	boxscore
25/01/2004	Sydney Kings	117–96	Victoria Giants	Sydney Entertainment Centre	4,693	boxscore
25/01/2004	Brisbane Bullets	100–88	Wollongong Hawks	Brisbane Convention & Exhibition Centre	3,009	boxscore

=== Round 18 ===
Date	Home	Score	Away	Venue	Crowd	Boxscore
28/01/2004	Sydney Kings	125–94	Hunter Pirates	Sydney Entertainment Centre	3,269	boxscore
28/01/2004	Cairns Taipans	92–90	Melbourne Tigers	Cairns Convention Centre	3,680	boxscore
28/01/2004	New Zealand Breakers	104–97	Perth Wildcats	Westpac Trust Centre	1,830	boxscore
30/01/2004	Brisbane Bullets	107–116	Melbourne Tigers	Brisbane Convention & Exhibition Centre	3,600	boxscore
30/01/2004	New Zealand Breakers	98–89	Perth Wildcats	North Shore Events Centre	3,122	boxscore
30/01/2004	Victoria Giants	85–101	Wollongong Hawks	Melbourne Sports & Aquatic Centre	1,410	boxscore
31/01/2004	Adelaide 36ers	94–103	Brisbane Bullets	Adelaide Arena	5,823	boxscore
31/01/2004	West Sydney Razorbacks	118–103	Hunter Pirates	State Sports Centre	2,782	boxscore
31/01/2004	Townsville Crocodiles	117–126	Melbourne Tigers	Townsville Entertainment Centre	5,129	boxscore
1/02/2004	Hunter Pirates	108–130	Wollongong Hawks	Newcastle Entertainment Centre	1,832	boxscore

=== Round 19 ===
Date	Home	Score	Away	Venue	Crowd	Boxscore
4/02/2004	Cairns Taipans	105–86	Adelaide 36ers	Cairns Convention Centre	4,031	boxscore
4/02/2004	Sydney Kings	107–97	Brisbane Bullets	Sydney Entertainment Centre	4,550	boxscore
4/02/2004	New Zealand Breakers	87–69	Victoria Giants	North Shore Events Centre	2,140	boxscore
4/02/2004	Wollongong Hawks	110–99	West Sydney Razorbacks	WIN Entertainment Centre	4,134	boxscore
6/02/2004	Hunter Pirates	82–93	New Zealand Breakers	Newcastle Entertainment Centre	1,879	boxscore
6/02/2004	Victoria Giants	102–105	Perth Wildcats	Melbourne Sports & Aquatic Centre	1,044	boxscore
7/02/2004	Townsville Crocodiles	122–112	Brisbane Bullets	Townsville Entertainment Centre	5,257	boxscore
7/02/2004	West Sydney Razorbacks	99–85	Cairns Taipans	State Sports Centre	2,482	boxscore
7/02/2004	Melbourne Tigers	95–87	Perth Wildcats	State Netball and Hockey Centre	3,265	boxscore
7/02/2004	Adelaide 36ers	104–105	Wollongong Hawks	Adelaide Arena	5,046	boxscore

=== Round 20 ===
Date	Home	Score	Away	Venue	Crowd	Boxscore
11/02/2004	Sydney Kings	88–80	Cairns Taipans	Sydney Entertainment Centre	3,650	boxscore
11/02/2004	Perth Wildcats	120–98	Townsville Crocodiles	Challenge Stadium	2,904	boxscore
11/02/2004	Hunter Pirates	91–102	Victoria Giants	Newcastle Entertainment Centre	1,503	boxscore
13/02/2004	West Sydney Razorbacks	108–94	Adelaide 36ers	State Sports Centre	3,128	boxscore
14/02/2004	Victoria Giants	106–103	Hunter Pirates	Melbourne Sports & Aquatic Centre	1,054	boxscore
14/02/2004	Sydney Kings	120–104	New Zealand Breakers	Sydney Entertainment Centre	4,780	boxscore
14/02/2004	Adelaide 36ers	124–111	Perth Wildcats	Adelaide Arena	4,846	boxscore
14/02/2004	Melbourne Tigers	109–94	West Sydney Razorbacks	State Netball and Hockey Centre	3,056	boxscore
14/02/2004	Townsville Crocodiles	90–95	Wollongong Hawks	Townsville Entertainment Centre	5,120	boxscore
15/02/2004	Cairns Taipans	116–97	Townsville Crocodiles	Cairns Convention Centre	5,070	boxscore

=== Round 21 ===
Date	Home	Score	Away	Venue	Crowd	Boxscore
18/02/2004	West Sydney Razorbacks	119–96	Adelaide 36ers	State Sports Centre	2,128	boxscore
18/02/2004	Perth Wildcats	113–89	Brisbane Bullets	Marrara Indoor Stadium	1,408	boxscore
18/02/2004	Melbourne Tigers	98–102	Townsville Crocodiles	State Netball and Hockey Centre	2,237	boxscore
18/02/2004	Sydney Kings	124–94	Victoria Giants	Sydney Entertainment Centre	3,969	boxscore
18/02/2004	New Zealand Breakers	84–108	Wollongong Hawks	North Shore Events Centre	4,358	boxscore
20/02/2004	Townsville Crocodiles	113–94	Victoria Giants	Townsville Entertainment Centre	5,065	boxscore
21/02/2004	Wollongong Hawks	112–118	Brisbane Bullets	WIN Entertainment Centre	4,901	boxscore
21/02/2004	Perth Wildcats	97–90	Hunter Pirates	Challenge Stadium	4,126	boxscore
21/02/2004	Adelaide 36ers	111–123	Melbourne Tigers	Adelaide Arena	5,687	boxscore
21/02/2004	West Sydney Razorbacks	78–104	Sydney Kings	State Sports Centre	4,236	boxscore
22/02/2004	Cairns Taipans	87–83	Victoria Giants	Cairns Convention Centre	4,550	boxscore

=== Round 22 ===
Date	Home	Score	Away	Venue	Crowd	Boxscore
23/02/2004	Perth Wildcats	106–93	Hunter Pirates	Kalgoorlie Stadium	1,100	boxscore
25/02/2004	West Sydney Razorbacks	104–91	Townsville Crocodiles	State Sports Centre	2,738	boxscore
27/02/2004	Wollongong Hawks	99–88	Perth Wildcats	WIN Entertainment Centre	4,879	boxscore
27/02/2004	Hunter Pirates	96–109	Townsville Crocodiles	Newcastle Entertainment Centre	1,738	boxscore
28/02/2004	Adelaide 36ers	93–88	New Zealand Breakers	Adelaide Arena	6,129	boxscore
28/02/2004	Brisbane Bullets	94–93	Sydney Kings	Brisbane Convention & Exhibition Centre	4,000	boxscore
28/02/2004	Cairns Taipans	86–83	West Sydney Razorbacks	Cairns Convention Centre	5,356	boxscore
29/02/2004	Victoria Giants	100–95	Perth Wildcats	Dandenong Stadium	1,648	boxscore
29/02/2004	Hunter Pirates	91–107	Melbourne Tigers	Newcastle Entertainment Centre	2,308	boxscore

== Ladder ==
Pos	2003–04 NBL season											
Pos	Team	Pld	W	L	PCT	Last 5	Streak	Home	Away	PF	PA	PP
1	Sydney Kings	33	26	7	78.79%	4–1	L1	14–3	12–4	3425	3029	113.07%
2	Wollongong Hawks	33	25	8	75.76%	4–1	W1	11–5	14–3	3391	3045	111.36%
3	West Sydney Razorbacks^{1}	33	22	11	66.67%	2–3	L1	13–4	9–7	3330	3172	104.98%
4	Brisbane Bullets^{1}	33	22	11	66.67%	2–3	W2	12–4	10–7	3463	3222	107.48%
5	Melbourne Tigers	33	20	13	60.61%	4–1	W2	11–5	9–8	3296	3239	101.76%
6	Cairns Taipans	33	16	17	48.48%	3–2	W3	11–5	5–12	3090	3025	102.15%
7	Perth Wildcats	33	15	18	45.45%	2–3	L2	13–3	2–15	3296	3342	98.62%
8	Adelaide 36ers	33	14	19	42.42%	2–3	W1	10–7	4–12	3359	3450	97.36%
9	Townsville Crocodiles	33	13	20	39.39%	3–2	W1	7–9	6–11	3365	3455	97.40%
10	New Zealand Breakers	33	12	21	36.36%	2–3	L3	8–9	4–12	3016	3198	94.31%
11	Victoria Giants	33	11	22	33.33%	2–3	W1	8–9	3–13	3113	3388	91.88%
12	Hunter Pirates	33	2	31	06.06%	0–5	L15	2–15	0–16	3065	3644	84.11%

Updated to match(es) played on 29 February 2004. Source: NBL.com.au

The NBL tie-breaker system as outlined in the NBL Rules and Regulations states that in the case of an identical win–loss record, the results in games played between the teams will determine order of seeding.

^{1}West Sydney Razorbacks won Head-to-Head (2-1).

== Finals ==
=== Playoff bracket ===
Elimination Finals
5	Melbourne Tigers	111
8	Adelaide 36ers	107
6	Cairns Taipans	103
7	Perth Wildcats	96

Quarterfinals
4	Brisbane Bullets	112
5	Melbourne Tigers	101
3	West Sydney Razorbacks	110
6	Cairns Taipans	88

Semifinals
1	Sydney Kings	104	101	X
4	Brisbane Bullets	100	96	X
2	Wollongong Hawks	91	95	X
3	West Sydney Razorbacks	107	110	X

Grand Final
1	Sydney Kings	96	72	80	82	90
3	West Sydney Razorbacks	76	87	82	77	79

=== Elimination Finals ===
Date	Home	Score	Away	Venue	Crowd	Boxscore
3/03/2004	Cairns Taipans	103–96	Perth Wildcats	Cairns Convention Centre	5,500	boxscore
5/03/2004	Melbourne Tigers	111–107	Adelaide 36ers	State Netball and Hockey Centre	2,459	boxscore
6/03/2004	West Sydney Razorbacks	110–88	Cairns Taipans	State Sports Centre	1,572	boxscore
7/03/2004	Brisbane Bullets	112–101	Melbourne Tigers	Brisbane Entertainment Centre	3,424	boxscore

=== Semi-finals ===
Date	Home	Score	Away	Venue	Crowd	Boxscore
12/03/2004	Wollongong Hawks	91–107	West Sydney Razorbacks	WIN Entertainment Centre	5,127	boxscore
13/03/2004	Sydney Kings	104–100	Brisbane Bullets	Sydney Entertainment Centre	6,005	boxscore
14/03/2004	Brisbane Bullets	96–101	Sydney Kings	Brisbane Entertainment Centre	4,213	boxscore
15/03/2004	West Sydney Razorbacks	110–95	Wollongong Hawks	State Sports Centre	2,755	boxscore

=== Grand Final ===
Date	Home	Score	Away	Venue	Crowd	Boxscore
24/03/2004	Sydney Kings	96–76	West Sydney Razorbacks	Sydney Entertainment Centre	7,126	boxscore
26/03/2004	West Sydney Razorbacks	87–72	Sydney Kings	State Sports Centre	4,038	boxscore
31/03/2004	Sydney Kings	80–82	West Sydney Razorbacks	Sydney Entertainment Centre	8,073	boxscore
4/04/2004	West Sydney Razorbacks	77–82	Sydney Kings	State Sports Centre	4,053	boxscore
6/04/2004	Sydney Kings	90–79	West Sydney Razorbacks	Sydney Entertainment Centre	9,609	boxscore

== All Star Game ==
Fox Sports

4 April 2004
18:00

boxscore
report

Eastern All Stars	129–126	Western All Stars
Scoring by quarter: 29–32, 37 –31, 31–24, 32–39
Pts: Knight 19; Rebs: Saville 12; Asts: Rose 5		Pts: Cattalini 27; Rebs: Bradtke 10; Asts: Rillie 7
Eastern All Stars win, 129–126

State Netball and Hockey Centre, Melbourne
Attendance: 2,238

=== Most Valuable Player ===
- Ebi Ere (Sydney Kings)

== Awards ==
- NBL Most Valuable Player: Matthew Nielsen (Sydney Kings)
- Larry Sengstock Medal (GF MVP): Matthew Nielsen (Sydney Kings)
- NBL Coach of the Year: Joey Wright (Brisbane Bullets)
- NBL Best Defensive Player: Ben Castle (Brisbane Bullets)
- NBL Rookie of the Year: Steven Markovic (West Sydney Razorbacks)
- NBL Most Improved Player: Geordie Cullen (Hunter Pirates)
- NBL Best Sixth Man: Darryl McDonald (Melbourne Tigers)
- Referee of the Year: Michael Aylen
- All-NBL First Team:
  - Matthew Nielsen (Sydney Kings)
  - Mark Bradtke (Melbourne Tigers)
  - Stephen Black (Brisbane Bullets)
  - John Rillie (West Sydney Razorbacks)
  - Sam Mackinnon (West Sydney Razorbacks)

=== Player of the month ===
- October: Matthew Nielsen (Sydney Kings)
- November: Dusty Rychart (Adelaide 36ers)
- December: Kevin Freeman (Brisbane Bullets)
- January: Mike Chappell (New Zealand Breakers)
- February: Matthew Nielsen (Sydney Kings)

=== Coach of the month ===
- October: Brian Goorjian (Sydney Kings)
- November: Brendan Joyce (Wollongong Hawks)
- December: Joey Wright (Brisbane Bullets)
- January: Gordon McLeod (West Sydney Razorbacks)
- February: Brendan Joyce (Wollongong Hawks)

== All NBL Team ==
#	Player	Team
PG	Stephen Black	Brisbane Bullets
SG	John Rillie	West Sydney Razorbacks
SF	Sam Mackinnon	West Sydney Razorbacks
PF	Matthew Nielsen	Sydney Kings
C	Mark Bradtke	Melbourne Tigers
