= Newcastle Entertainment Centre =

Multi-purpose arena in NSW, Australia

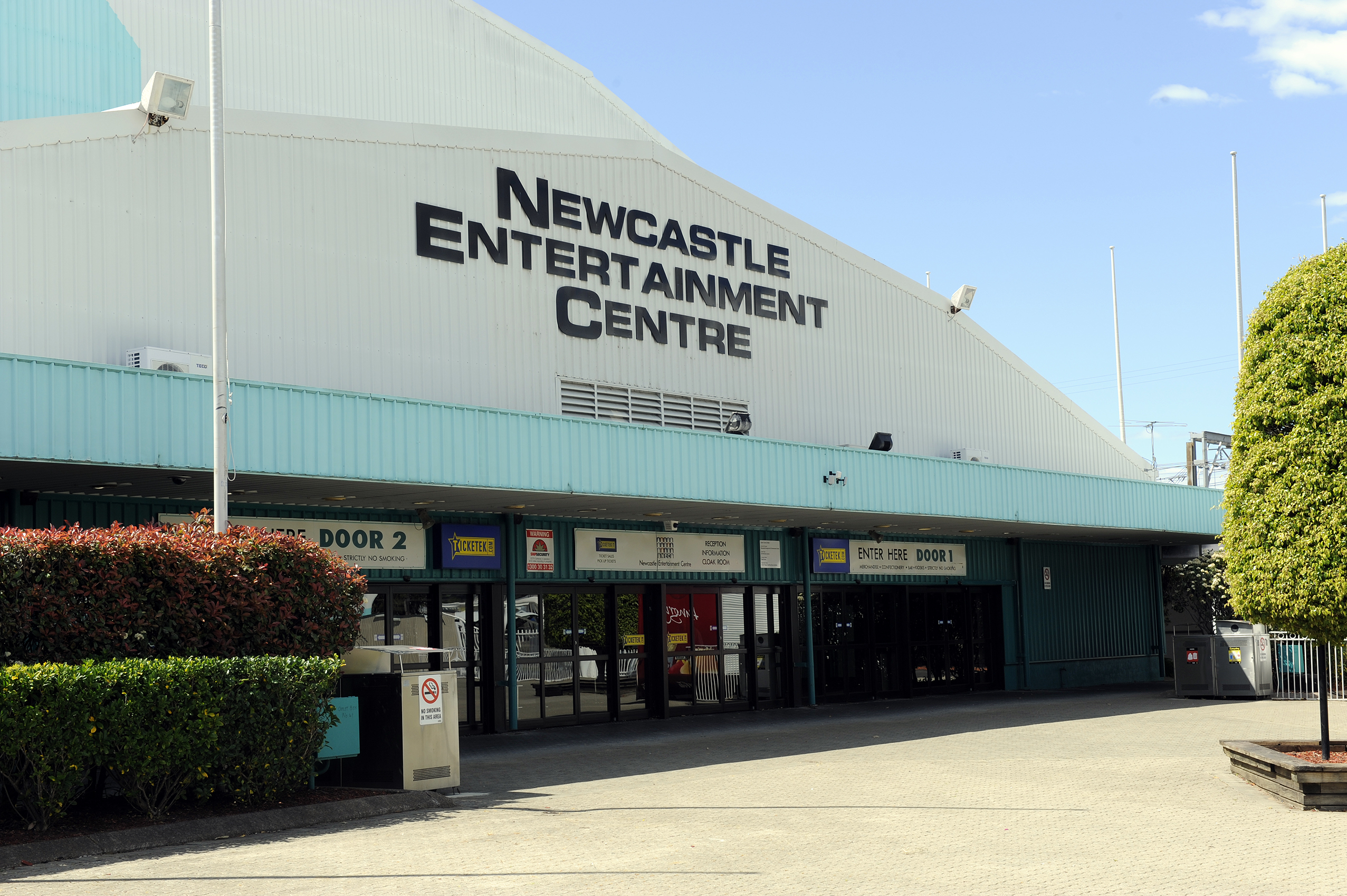
- Exterior of Newcastle Entertainment Centre
- Interactive map of Newcastle Entertainment Centre
- Location: Newcastle Showground, Brown Road, Broadmeadow, New South Wales, Australia
- Coordinates: 32°55′15″S 151°44′10.5″E
- Owner: Venues NSW
- Operator: ASM Global
- Capacity: 7,528
- Field size: 54.4 m × 79.3 m (178 ft × 260 ft)
- Public transit: Broadmeadow railway station

Construction
- Groundbreaking: 1991
- Opened: 21 June 1992
- Cost: $12 million

Tenants
- Newcastle Falcons (NBL) (1992–1999); Hunter Jaegers (National Netball League) (1997–2008); Hunter Pirates (NBL) (2003–2006); Singapore Slingers (NBL) (2006); NSW Swifts (ANZ Championship) (2008, 2010, 2012)

Website
- www.nec.net.au

Newcastle Entertainment Centre is a multi-purpose Australian arena within the Newcastle Showground. It was opened in 1992.

The venue has a seating capacity of 7,528. The centre is air-conditioned (installed as a requirement of the NBL when it moved to playing in the summer), equipped with top-grade lights, and also has scoreboards used for basketball and netball games. The venue is owned by Venues NSW and operated by ASM Global.

== Tenants ==
The centre's original tenant was the Newcastle Falcons NBL team who moved to the new venue in 1992 from their previous home at the Broadmeadow Basketball Stadium. After the Falcons folded at the end of the 1999 season its only tenant was the Hunter Jaegers netball team who played in the Commonwealth Bank Trophy. The Jaegers played in the centre from 1997 until 2008. From 2003 the NEC served as the home court for another NBL team, the Hunter Pirates (formerly the Canberra Cannons before the team was moved to Singapore to become the Singapore Slingers after the 2005-06 NBL season). However one more NBL game was played between The Singapore Slingers & The New Zealand Breakers on 29 December 2006.

The Newcastle Show uses the centre for various displays and the showbag area. The stadium has also played host to some of Kostya Tszyu's early fights as an Australian-based fighter.

== Modes ==
The Newcastle Entertainment Centre was built as a multi-purpose facility to host concerts, sporting events, exhibitions and functions.

=== Concert ===
The centre has the following capacities in its different concert modes:

- General Admission mode – up to 7,528 patrons
- End Stage mode – up to 6,193 patrons seated
- Reduced mode – variable between 2,500 and 7,528 patrons

Curtaining allows the adapting of the venues to suit more intimate modes for performers. The centre has played host to concerts by many nationally and internationally renowned performers.

=== Sports ===
The centre has hosted numerous basketball, netball, boxing, bull riding, ice staking, mixed martial arts, and tennis events. In sports mode, the centre can accommodate between 2,000 and 5,000 patrons.

=== Exhibition ===
The seating in the venue is fully retractable providing 4,100 square metres of clear span exhibition space.

=== Function ===
The centre is able to host functions catering up to 2,000 guests.

== See also ==
- List of indoor arenas in Australia
