= NBL Best Defensive Player Award =

The National Basketball League Best Defensive Player is an annual National Basketball League (NBL) award given since the 1980 NBL season to the best defensive player of the regular season. As of the 2023–24 season, the head coach, assistant coach and captain of each team vote for the Defensive Player of the Year. Voters are not allowed to vote for players from their own team. The winner receives the Damian Martin Trophy, which was named in honour of Damian Martin who won the award six times.

== Winners ==
Year	Player	Nationality	Team
1980	Ray Wood	Australia	West Adelaide Bearcats
1981	Ray Wood (2)	Australia	West Adelaide Bearcats
1982	Phil Smyth	Australia	St. Kilda Saints
1983	Phil Smyth (2)	Australia	Canberra Cannons
1984	N/A	N/A	N/A
1985	N/A	N/A	N/A
1986	N/A	N/A	N/A
1987	Leroy Loggins	United States	Brisbane Bullets
1988	Phil Smyth (3)	Australia	Canberra Cannons
1989	Phil Smyth (4)	Australia	Canberra Cannons
1990	Leroy Loggins (2)	United States	Brisbane Bullets
1991	Terry Dozier	United States	Geelong Supercats
1992	Terry Dozier (2)	United States	Newcastle Falcons
1993	Terry Dozier (3)	United States	Newcastle Falcons
1994	Darren Lucas	Australia	South East Melbourne Magic
1995	Darren Lucas (2)	Australia	South East Melbourne Magic
1996	Isaac Burton	United States	Sydney Kings
1997	Mike Kelly	United States	South East Melbourne Magic
1998	Mike Kelly (2)	United States	South East Melbourne Magic
1998–99	Darnell Mee	United States	Adelaide 36ers
1999–2000	Darnell Mee (2)	United States	Adelaide 36ers
2000–01	Darnell Mee (3)	United States	Adelaide 36ers
2001–02	Simon Dwight	Australia	West Sydney Razorbacks
2002–03	Glen Saville	Australia	Wollongong Hawks
2003–04	Ben Castle	Australia	Brisbane Bullets
2004–05	Darnell Mee (4)	United States	Wollongong Hawks
2005–06	Darnell Mee (5)	United States	Cairns Taipans
2006–07	Sam Mackinnon	Australia	Brisbane Bullets
2007–08	Chris Anstey	Australia	Melbourne Tigers
2008–09	Adam Gibson	Australia	South Dragons
2009–10	Dillon Boucher	New Zealand	New Zealand Breakers
2010–11	Damian Martin	Australia	Perth Wildcats
2011–12	Damian Martin (2)	Australia	Perth Wildcats
2012–13	Damian Martin (3)	Australia	Perth Wildcats
2013–14	Damian Martin (4)	Australia	Perth Wildcats
2014–15	Damian Martin (5)	Australia	Perth Wildcats
2015–16	Kevin Lisch	United States	Illawarra Hawks
2016–17	Torrey Craig	United States	Brisbane Bullets
2017–18	Damian Martin (6)	Australia	Perth Wildcats
2018–19	Andrew Bogut	Australia	Sydney Kings
2019–20	D. J. Newbill	United States	Cairns Taipans
2020–21	Justin Simon	United States	Illawarra Hawks
2021–22	Antonius Cleveland	United States	Illawarra Hawks
2022–23	Antonius Cleveland (2)	United States	Adelaide 36ers
2023–24	Shea Ili	New Zealand	Melbourne United
2024–25	Shea Ili (2)	New Zealand	Melbourne United
2025–26	John Brown	United States	South East Melbourne Phoenix
