= Foot Locker Elite Classic – High Stakes Hoops =

2010 basketball tournament in Adelaide, Australia

The Foot Locker Elite Classic – High Stakes Hoops was a basketball tournament held in Adelaide, South Australia from 6 to 11 April 2010. There were eight teams in the competition (Coasters, Cyclones, Fleet, Monarchs, Pythons, Rays, Reef and Rush) and players from across the globe participated. There was a total prize pool of $250,000, with the competition being broadcast on Australia's One HD channel.

The High Stakes Hoops competition was held outside of the normal NBL season and had a number of rules which were different from NBL and FIBA. These included using jump balls to settle tie-ups with no use of the possession arrow, only allowing one full timeout and one 20-second timeout in each half, and running 48-minute games.

A new concept used throughout the tournament was the 'Game Breaker' play. Twice during each game, the coach could elect to use a 'Game Breaker' play when for the next three minutes of clock time, the team in the 'Game Breaker' phase had each successful three-point shot counted as four points. The team's backboard was lit in green during this time.

The Rays, a team consisting of Adam Gibson, Tony Ronaldson, Peter Crawford, Damian Martin and Kevin Lisch, won the tournament.
