= Sam Mackinnon =

Australian basketball coach (born 1976)

Southside Melbourne Flyers
- Title: Head coach
- League: WNBL

Personal information
- Born: 25 August 1976 (age 50) Melbourne, Victoria, Australia
- Listed height: 197 cm (6 ft 6 in)
- Listed weight: 104 kg (229 lb)

Career information
- Playing career: 1993–2010
- Position: Shooting guard / small forward
- Coaching career: 2017–present

Career history

Playing
- 1993: North East Melbourne Arrows
- 1994–1998: S.E. Melbourne Magic
- 1998–2001: Townsville Crocodiles
- 2001–2005: West Sydney Razorbacks
- 2005–2008: Brisbane Bullets
- 2006: Basket Rimini Crabs
- 2007: Southern Districts Spartans
- 2008–2010: Melbourne Tigers

Coaching
- 2017–2020: Brisbane Bullets (assistant)
- 2022: Brisbane Bullets (interim)
- 2023–2025: South East Melbourne Phoenix (assistant)
- 2024: South East Melbourne Phoenix (interim)
- 2024–2025: Taranaki Airs
- 2026–present: Southside Melbourne Flyers

Career highlights
- 2× NBL champion (1996, 2007); NBL Grand Final MVP (2007); NBL Most Valuable Player (2007); 3× All-NBL First Team (2000, 2004, 2007); 2× All-NBL Second Team (1998, 2006); All-NBL Third Team (1999); NBL Best Defensive Player (2007); NBL Rookie of the Year (1994); ABA national champion (1993); 2× Gaze Medal winner (2006, 2007)
Medals
Men's basketball
Representing Australia
Gold medal – first place	2006 Melbourne	Team competition

Samuel Mackinnon (born 25 August 1976) is an Australian basketball coach and former player who is currently head coach of the Southside Melbourne Flyers of the Women's National Basketball League (WNBL). He played in the National Basketball League (NBL) between 1994 and 2010, where he won two NBL championships (1996 and 2007) and was named the NBL Most Valuable Player in 2007.

== Early life ==
Mackinnon was born in Melbourne, Victoria. His junior association was Diamond Valley.

== Professional career ==
In 1993, Mackinnon debuted in the South East Australian Basketball League (SEABL) for the North East Melbourne Arrows. The Arrows won the 1993 ABA national championship.

Mackinnon's NBL career began in the 1994 season with the South East Melbourne Magic, where he won NBL Rookie of the Year. He helped the Magic win the NBL championship in the 1996 season and played in NBL grand finals in 1997 and 1998.

After South East Melbourne folded, Mackinnon joined the Townsville Crocodiles for the 1998–99 NBL season. In the 1999–2000 NBL season, he was named All-NBL First Team. In the 2000–01 NBL season, the Crocodiles made the grand final, however Mackinnon missed the series due to injury.

For the 2001–02 NBL season, Mackinnon joined the West Sydney Razorbacks, but he missed the whole season and the Razorbacks' grand final appearance due to injury. He debuted for the Razorbacks in the 2002–03 NBL season. In the 2003–04 NBL season, he helped the Razorbacks return to the grand final, where they lost 3–2 to the Sydney Kings. That season, he was named All-NBL First Team for the second time and finished as runner-up for league MVP. Following the 2004–05 NBL season, he picked up his third consecutive Club MVP with the Razorbacks.

In March 2005, Mackinnon signed a three-year deal with the Brisbane Bullets. Following the 2005–06 NBL season, he had a four-game stint with Basket Rimini Crabs in Italy. In the 2006–07 NBL season, Mackinnon led the Bullets to the NBL championship while earning grand final MVP honours. He was named NBL MVP, All-NBL First Team, and NBL Best Defensive Player.

During the 2007 NBL off-season, Mackinnon attempted to enter the NBA after securing workouts with the San Antonio Spurs, Cleveland Cavaliers, Toronto Raptors and Miami Heat. That same off-season, he played four games for the Southern Districts Spartans in the SEABL.

Mackinnon returned to the Bullets for the 2007–08 season but a knee injury cut short his season. He also needed treatment for blood clots in his lungs.

In July 2008, Mackinnon signed a three-year deal with the Melbourne Tigers. He retired from the NBL following the 2009–10 season.

== National team career ==
Mackinnon was a regular member of the Australian Boomers between 1995 and 2007. He competed at the 1996 and 2000 Olympic Games, and helped Australia win a gold medal at the 2006 Commonwealth Games. He was named Boomers captain in 2007 but missed the 2008 Olympic Games because of a knee injury suffered during the 2007–08 NBL season.

== Coaching career ==
On 30 July 2017, Mackinnon returned to the Brisbane Bullets as an assistant coach. He remained as an assistant with the Bullets until 2020, when he moved into the front office. In November 2022, he took on the role of the Bullets' interim head coach after the team parted ways with James Duncan. He handed over the interim coach reins to Greg Vanderjagt on 13 December 2022. His tenure as General Manager of Basketball at the Bullets ended in February 2023.

In May 2023, Mackinnon was appointed assistant coach of the South East Melbourne Phoenix for two seasons.

In September 2023, Mackinnon was appointed head coach of the Taranaki Airs in the New Zealand NBL ahead of the 2024 season.

On 13 October 2024, Mackinnon was elevated to the Phoenix's interim head coach after the club fired Mike Kelly following a 0–5 start to the 2024–25 NBL season. He served as interim coach in three games and went 2–1. He returned to his role as an assistant following round six. On 24 March 2025, he parted ways with the Phoenix.

Mackinnon re-joined the Taranaki Airs as head coach for the 2025 season.

On 31 March 2026, Mackinnon was appointed head coach of the Southside Melbourne Flyers of the Women's National Basketball League (WNBL) for the 2026–27 season.
