= Darnell Mee =

American-Australian basketball player

Personal information
- Born: February 11, 1971 (age 55) Cleveland, Tennessee, U.S.
- Listed height: 6 ft 5 in (1.96 m)
- Listed weight: 175 lb (79 kg)

Career information
- High school: Cleveland (Cleveland, Tennessee)
- College: Western Kentucky (1990–1993)
- NBA draft: 1993: 2nd round, 34th overall pick
- Drafted by: Golden State Warriors
- Playing career: 1993–2009
- Position: Shooting guard
- Number: 4
- Coaching career: 2013–2016

Career history

Playing
- 1993: Daytona Beach Hooters
- 1993–1995: Denver Nuggets
- 1995: Tri-City Chinook
- 1995: Yakima Sun Kings
- 1996: Canberra Cannons
- 1996–1997: Gravelines
- 1998–2001: Adelaide 36ers
- 2000: Kinder Bologna
- 2001–2002: Bayer Giants Leverkusen
- 2002: BC Besancon
- 2002–2003: Cairns Taipans
- 2003–2005: Wollongong Hawks
- 2005–2009: Cairns Taipans

Coaching
- 2013–2014: Moberly Area CC (assistant)
- 2014: Bowling Green Bandits
- 2016: Woodville Warriors

Career highlights
- 2× NBL champion (1998, 1999); 2× All-NBL First Team (2001, 2005); 2× All-NBL Second Team (1999, 2000); 2× All-NBL Third Team (2004, 2006); 5× NBL Best Defensive Player (1999–2001, 2005, 2006)
- Stats at NBA.com
- Stats at Basketball Reference

LaFarrell Darnell Mee (born February 11, 1971) is an American-Australian former professional basketball player who played 12 seasons in the National Basketball League (NBL). He played college basketball for Western Kentucky before being selected by the Golden State Warriors with the 34th overall pick in the 1993 NBA draft. He played 40 games in the NBA for the Denver Nuggets. In his 12 seasons in Australia, Mee was named the NBL Best Defensive Player five times and won two NBL championships. He became an Australian citizen in 2006.

== College career ==
Coming out of Tennessee's Cleveland High School in 1989, Mee sat out his freshman season at Western Kentucky due to failing to qualify academically. Between 1990 and 1993, Mee played for the Hilltoppers and averaged 13.8 points, 5.2 rebounds, 3.0 assists, 2.8 steals and 1.2 blocks in 91 games.

== Professional career ==
Coming out of college, Mee played in the United States Basketball League for the Daytona Beach Hooters.

Mee was selected by the Golden State Warriors with the 34th overall pick in the 1993 NBA draft. He was subsequently traded to the Denver Nuggets, where he played 40 NBA games over two seasons.

In 1995, Mee had stints in the Continental Basketball Association for the Tri-City Chinook and Yakima Sun Kings.

In 1996, Mee moved to Australia to play for the Canberra Cannons of the National Basketball League.

For the 1996–97 season, Mee moved to France to play for Gravelines.

Mee returned to Australia in 1998 to play for the Adelaide 36ers. He continued on with the 36ers in 1998–99 and 1999–2000. After a stint in Italy with Kinder Bologna, he returned to the 36ers for a fourth season in 2000–01 season.

For the 2001–02 season, Mee moved to Germany to play for Bayer Giants Leverkusen.

Mee began the 2002–03 season in France with BC Besançon, before returning to Australia in November 2002 to play out the NBL season with the Cairns Taipans.

Between 2003 and 2005, Mee played for the Wollongong Hawks in the NBL. He returned to the Taipans in 2005 and played out his career in Cairns over the next four seasons. In February 2006, he was named the NBL's Best Defensive Player for a record fifth time.

== National team career ==
Mee represented the Australian national team in 2007 at the FIBA Oceania Championship.

== Coaching career ==
After the end of his playing career in 2009, Mee returned to the United States and finished his degree in recreation administration at Western Kentucky University. During that time, he was a voluntary assistant coach at the WKU men's basketball team. He then worked as a coach at the high school level and in 2013 became an assistant coach at Moberly Area Community College. Mee then held the head coaching position with the Bowling Green Bandits in the ABA. In the 2016 season, he served as head coach of the Woodville Warriors in Australia. After one season, he returned to the US, where he started working as a basketball coach in his hometown of Cleveland, Tennessee.

== Personal life ==
Mee's son, Micale, plays college basketball at Texas Wesleyan University.
