= Kevin Lisch =

American-Australian basketball player

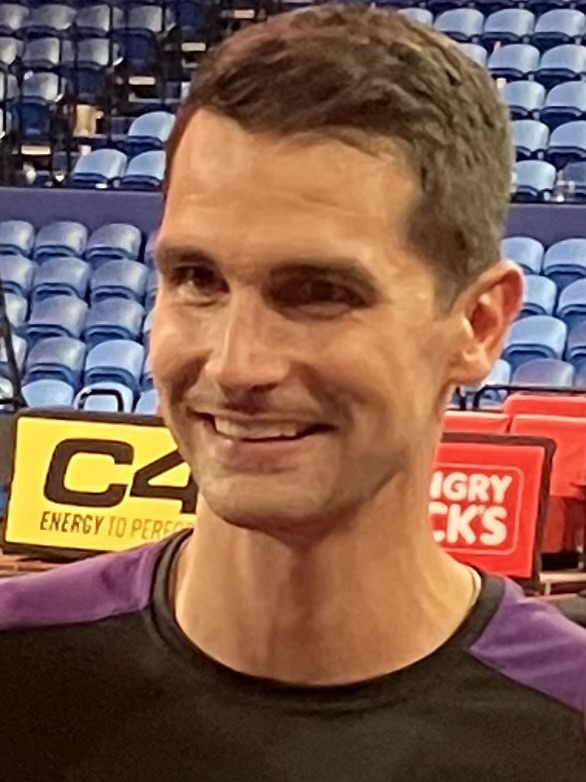
- Lisch with the Sydney Kings in 2023

Personal information
- Born: May 16, 1986 (age 40) Belleville, Illinois, U.S.
- Listed height: 188 cm (6 ft 2 in)
- Listed weight: 88 kg (194 lb)

Career information
- High school: Althoff Catholic (Belleville, Illinois)
- College: Saint Louis (2005–2009)
- NBA draft: 2009: undrafted
- Playing career: 2009–2020
- Position: Shooting guard / point guard
- Coaching career: 2020–2023

Career history

Playing
- 2009–2013: Perth Wildcats
- 2013: Piratas de Quebradillas
- 2013–2014: JSF Nanterre
- 2014–2015: CAI Zaragoza
- 2015–2016: Illawarra Hawks
- 2016: Piratas de Quebradillas
- 2016–2020: Sydney Kings

Coaching
- 2020–2023: Sydney Kings (assistant)

Career highlights
- As player: NBL champion (2010); NBL Grand Final MVP (2010); 2× NBL Most Valuable Player (2012, 2016); 3× All-NBL First Team (2012, 2013, 2016); All-NBL Second Team (2017); NBL Best Defensive Player (2016); NBL scoring champion (2012); French Cup champion (2014); BSN champion (2013); BSN Finals MVP (2013); 2× Third-team All-Atlantic 10 (2008, 2009); 2× Atlantic 10 All-Defensive Team (2007, 2008); Atlantic 10 All-Rookie Team (2006); As assistant coach: 2× NBL champion (2022, 2023)

Kevin John Lisch (born May 16, 1986) is an American former professional basketball player and coach, most known for his time spent in the Australian National Basketball League (NBL) as a player. He also holds an Italian passport and is an Australian citizen.

Lisch played college basketball for the Saint Louis Billikens between 2005 and 2009, where he finished as the sixth-highest scorer in school history. After college, he made a name for himself in the NBL in Australia. He won an NBL championship and grand final MVP with the Perth Wildcats in his first professional season before winning the league MVP in 2012 and leading the Wildcats to another two grand finals in 2012 and 2013. He returned to the NBL in 2015 after two seasons playing in Europe, joining the Illawarra Hawks and winning his second league MVP. In 2016, he joined the Sydney Kings and made his debut for the Australian national team at the Rio Olympics. He played four seasons with the Kings and retired in 2020. He subsequently moved into an assistant coach position and helped the Kings win championships in 2022 and 2023.

== Early life ==
Born and raised in Belleville, Illinois, Lisch grew up in a family of four kids. His faith was always important to him while attending Catholic schools as a youth, beginning with Blessed Sacrament for grade school and then Althoff Catholic High School.

Lisch played basketball for Althoff Catholic and was often triple-defended on the court. He was an all-state guard and was twice named Belleville News-Democrat Player of the Year. He finished his tenure as the school's all-time leading scorer with 2,000 points. Lisch was also a bright student, joining the student council and the National Honor Society.

== College career ==
Lisch continued on at a Catholic institute for college, joining Saint Louis University (SLU). At Saint Louis, Lisch played under coaches Brad Soderberg (2005–07) and Rick Majerus (2007–09) while earning a bachelor's degree in marketing and an MBA in four years.

As a freshman playing for the Billikens in 2005–06, Lisch was selected to the A-10 All-Rookie Team and was a three-time recipient of the A-10 Rookie of the Week award. He was the team's second-leading scorer at 11.1 points per game and top three-point shooter with 58 treys, which set the SLU freshman single-season record.

As a sophomore in 2006–07, Lisch was on the A-10 All-Defensive Team and earned honorable mention All-Conference selection. He was also named to the Shelby Classic All-Tournament team. He was second on the team and 13th in the A-10 with 14.9 points per game, and dealt a team-high 3.47 assists per game to rank eighth in the league. He led the team in assists in 19 games and was the top scorer 13 times—he scored in double figures in 26 games, including the last 14.

As a junior in 2007–08, Lisch was named third-team All-Conference and to the All-Defensive team. He was also voted to the Academic All-Conference squad and was selected to the Hispanic College Fund Challenge All-Tournament team. He led the team in scoring at 14.6 points per game, assists with 97 and steals with 38.

As a senior in 2008–09, Lisch was named ESPN The Magazine Academic All-American third team and was a first-team Academic All-District selection. He was chosen to the NABC All-District second team and voted the A-10 Men's Basketball Student-Athlete of the Year. He was also third-team All-Conference and was named to the Las Vegas Classic All-Tournament team. In 31 games as a senior, he averaged 14.1 points, 3.5 rebounds, 2.5 assists and 1.3 steals per game.

Lisch closed out his career in sixth place on SLU's scoring list with 1,687 points. His 325 assists rank ninth on the career chart and his 259 three-pointers are second only to the school-record 295 by Erwin Claggett. Lisch's 133 steals rank fifth at SLU also. As a result of his standout four-year tenure, Lisch was named to the Billikens' All-Century Team and was inducted into the SLU Hall of Fame.

== Professional career ==
=== Perth Wildcats (2009–2013) ===
==== 2009–10 season ====
In July 2009, Lisch signed with the Perth Wildcats of the Australian National Basketball League. He was swayed to come to Perth due to the close friendship between Billikens coach Rick Majerus and Wildcats coach Rob Beveridge. He struggled at the start of the 2009–10 season, and due to the high-profile imports traditionally signed by the Wildcats, some were calling for Lisch to be cut as early as the preseason tournament. Lisch debuted with a 12-point effort on September 25, 2009, against the Wollongong Hawks, and then had the game-winning, buzzer-beating 3-pointer the following game against the Townsville Crocodiles on October 2 to finish with 16 points. He scored in double figures in seven of his first eight games, including 21 points against the Melbourne Tigers on October 25, before registering 11 single-figure games throughout the rest of the season, including five straight games of under seven points between December 19 and January 8. To finish the regular season, he scored in double figures in four out of the final six games, including a 19-point effort in the regular-season finale on February 14 against the Crocodiles.

The Wildcats finished the regular season as minor premiers with a 17–11 record, and faced the Gold Coast Blaze in the semi-finals. Behind Lisch's 19 points in Game 1 and 18 points in Game 2, the Wildcats swept the Blaze to move on to the 2010 NBL Grand Final series, where they faced Wollongong. With the series tied at 1–1, Lisch took over in Game 3 to score a game-high and season-high 29 points with five 3-pointers in leading the Wildcats to the championship with a 96–72 victory over the Hawks. Lisch, who posted 15 points in Game 1 and 11 in Game 2, was named grand final MVP. Lisch appeared in all 33 games for the Wildcats in 2009–10, averaging 12.1 points, 2.7 rebounds and 2.3 assists per game.

==== 2010–11 season ====
In April 2010, Lisch re-signed with the Wildcats for the 2010–11 NBL season. He reportedly knocked back a two-year contract offer in favour of a one-year deal. He had contemplated a move to Europe and was on the radar of several other NBL clubs. He came into the 2010–11 season sporting a more muscular tone, having bulked up for his second season after spending countless hours running and working out in the weights room. Lisch scored in double figures in all but nine games during the regular season, registering over 20 points three times. The Wildcats finished the regular season in fourth place with a 16–12 record, and faced the first-placed New Zealand Breakers in the semi-finals. Behind a 29-point effort, Lisch helped the Wildcats take Game 1 of the series in Auckland, before the Breakers came back to win Games 2 and 3. Lisch appeared in all 31 games for the Wildcats in 2010–11, averaging 13.5 points, 3.2 rebounds and 2.5 assists per game. He was named the team's co-MVP alongside Shawn Redhage.

==== 2011–12 season ====
In May 2011, Lisch re-signed with the Wildcats on a two-year deal. He helped the Wildcats start the 2011–12 season with a 3–1 record and averaged 22.0 points per game during the month of October. He was subsequently named the NBL Player of the Month. Lisch spent time as a ball handler early in the season in the absence of the injured Damian Martin, sharing the ball carrying role largely with co-captain Brad Robbins.

Lisch scored in double figures in every game but three during the regular season, helping the Wildcats finish second on the ladder with a 19–9 record. He was subsequently named the NBL Most Valuable Player and to the All-NBL First Team. He joined Paul Rogers (2000) as the only Wildcats players to win league MVP. He helped the Wildcats defeat the Gold Coast Blaze 2–1 in the semi-finals to move on to the 2012 NBL Grand Final series. There the Wildcats faced the New Zealand Breakers, but despite Lisch averaging 19 points per game in the series, the Wildcats were defeated 2–1. He appeared in all 34 games for the Wildcats in 2011–12, averaging 17.3 points, 3.7 rebounds and 3.2 assists per game.

==== 2012–13 season ====
Following his MVP season, Lisch became a defensive target in the 2012–13 season, with the extra attention creating more scoring opportunities for teammate Matthew Knight. Over the first half of the season, Lisch was named Player of the Week for Round 8 and earned selection to the South All-Stars team as the starting shooting guard for the 2012 NBL All-Star Game. However, he was forced to withdraw after being diagnosed with a Grade 2 groin strain. Additionally, against the Townsville Crocodiles on October 14, Lisch played his 100th consecutive NBL game, becoming the first player since Darryl McDonald 15 years earlier to achieve 100 consecutive games. Over the second half of the season, he set a season high with 26 points against the Cairns Taipans on January 5, and on February 4, he was named to the Perth Wildcats 30th Anniversary All-Star team.

Lisch scored in double figures in every game but five during the regular season, helping the Wildcats finish second on the ladder with a 22–6 record. He was subsequently named in the All-NBL First Team for the second straight year. He helped the Wildcats sweep the Wollongong Hawks in the semi-finals to move on to the 2013 NBL Grand Final series. There the Wildcats once again faced the New Zealand Breakers, only to lose the series in straight sets. He appeared in all 32 games for the Wildcats in 2012–13, averaging 15.2 points, 2.8 rebounds and 3.0 assists per game. He was named the Wildcats' Club MVP for the third straight year.

In late May 2013, Lisch and coach Rob Beveridge parted ways with the Wildcats. In each of the Wildcats' 130 games since the beginning of the 2009–10 season, both Lisch and Beveridge took to the floor in every contest. In four seasons, Lisch averaged 14.6 points, 3.1 rebounds and 2.7 assists per game. He ended his tenure in Perth to pursue his European aspirations.

=== Puerto Rico (2013) ===
Following the conclusion of the 2012–13 NBL season, Lisch joined Piratas de Quebradillas of the Baloncesto Superior Nacional (BSN) alongside former Wildcats teammate Shawn Redhage. He went on to lead the team to their first championship in over 30 years, beating Ponce Lions in six games in the best-of-seven BSN finals series. Lisch was named MVP of the series after recording 20 points, nine rebounds and five assists in Game 6. In 35 games for Quebradillas, he averaged 16.6 points, 3.6 rebounds, 4.9 assists and 1.6 steals per game.

=== Europe (2013–2015) ===
On July 6, 2013, Lisch signed a one-year deal with French team JSF Nanterre. There he teamed-up with his brother-in-law, Trenton Meacham. However, due to a broken finger, he was unable to debut for Nanterre until January. He appeared in 11 league games for Nanterre in 2013–14, averaging 8.6 points, 2.6 rebounds, 1.7 assists and 1.3 steals per game. He also appeared in eight Eurocup games, averaging 7.1 points, 2.1 rebounds, 1.8 assists and 1.5 steals per game. In May 2014, he helped Nanterre win the French Cup, scoring four points in the 55–50 win over SLUC Nancy in the final.

In June 2014, Lisch parted ways with Nanterre and signed with Spanish team CAI Zaragoza. He appeared in 34 league games for Zaragoza in 2014–15, averaging 6.4 points, 1.5 rebounds and 2.6 assists per game. He also appeared in 15 Eurocup games, averaging 6.0 points, 1.1 rebounds and 3.4 assists per game.

Following the 2014–15 season, Zaragoza offered to renew Lisch's contract, but he declined in order to return to Australia.

=== Illawarra Hawks (2015–2016) ===
On July 6, 2015, Lisch signed with the Illawarra Hawks for the 2015–16 season, returning to the Australian National Basketball League for a second stint and re-joining his former Wildcats mentor, Rob Beveridge, at the Hawks. In his debut for the Hawks on October 8, 2015, Lisch contributed seven points before hobbling off the court during the third quarter of their game against the Cairns Taipans with a knee injury. He watched the remainder of the game from the bench with his right knee in a brace, and subsequently missed the Hawks' next three games. He returned to action on October 25 to face his former team, the Perth Wildcats, for the first time. Making his first appearance for the Hawks at home, Lisch recorded 15 points and seven assists in a 106–99 loss to the Wildcats.

On January 7, 2016, Lisch was named NBL Player of the Month for December after leading the Hawks to five wins in six games and averaging 22.7 points, 4.3 assists and 3.8 rebounds per game throughout the month. On January 17, he scored a career-high 40 points in a 103–96 double-overtime win over the New Zealand Breakers in Auckland. Four days later, he played his 150th NBL game in a loss to the Wildcats in Perth.

Lisch helped the Hawks finish the regular season in third place with a 17–11 record, which set them up to play the second-seeded Perth Wildcats in the semi-finals. Their chances of defeating the Wildcats were weakened when Lisch went down heavily on his left ankle late in the first quarter of Game 1 in Perth and did not return, only coming back to the team's bench in the second half in a moon boot on crutches. The Wildcats subsequently took Game 1. The injury ruled Lisch out of Game 2, but the Hawks managed to rally at home to even the series. He recovered in time to face the Wildcats in Game 3; however, despite Lisch's return, the Hawks were defeated 89–74, as they bowed out of the finals with a 2–1 series loss.

Prior to the start of the finals, Lisch was named the recipient of the Andrew Gaze Trophy as the NBL's most valuable player for the 2015–16 season. Lisch, who was also named NBL Best Defensive Player and All-NBL First Team, became just the second player in league history to win the award with two different teams. He also became the fourth Hawks player to win the award, joining Mike Jones (1981), Gary Ervin (2011) and Rotnei Clarke (2014), while becoming only the sixth player in NBL history to have been named MVP in multiple seasons, joining Andrew Gaze (7), Scott Fisher (2), Leroy Loggins (2), Robert Rose (2) and Chris Anstey (2). In 27 games for the Hawks in 2015–16, he averaged 19.4 points, 3.5 rebounds, 3.3 assists and 1.8 steals per game.

=== Second stint in Puerto Rico (2016) ===
In April 2016, Lisch re-joined Piratas de Quebradillas in Puerto Rico, returning to the team for a second stint. On May 2, he scored a season-high 32 points in a 99–95 double-overtime loss to Santeros de Aguada. In 20 games for Quebradillas in 2016, Lisch averaged 14.8 points, 3.9 rebounds, 5.4 assists and 1.3 steals per game.

=== Sydney Kings (2016–2020) ===
==== 2016–17 season ====
On April 2, 2016, after turning down a contract extension with the Illawarra Hawks, Lisch signed a three-year deal with the Sydney Kings. He joined the Kings as an unrestricted player after becoming an Australian citizen the previous month. He was later appointed team captain for the 2016–17 NBL season.

In his debut for the Kings in their season opener on October 8, 2016, Lisch scored a game-high 20 points in a 77–73 loss to the Brisbane Bullets. He missed a game on October 30 against Brisbane due to a minor leg injury. On November 12, 2016, he scored a season-high 30 points in an 87–71 win over Melbourne United. By mid-November, Lisch had led the Kings to atop the NBL ladder behind his 18 points per game. By Round 11, the Kings had slipped from the top spot, and by Round 14 they were no longer among the top four. The Kings missed the finals in 2016–17 after losing nine of their final twelve games, finishing seventh on the ladder with a 13–15 record. Lisch appeared in 27 out of the Kings' 28 games, averaging 16.5 points, 3.5 rebounds, 3.7 assists and 1.9 steals per game.

==== 2017–18 season ====
Lisch underwent minor knee surgery during the off-season to help resolve a nagging injury that curtailed his performance in 2016–17. After an off-season of rest and a training schedule refinement, Lisch entered the 2017–18 NBL season ready to redeem himself. During the pre-season, Lisch and the Kings travelled to the United States to face the Utah Jazz in a historic NBAxNBL pre-season game on October 2. Lisch scored 13 points in the 108–83 loss.

The Kings started the season with Lisch at point guard, with the experiment being heavily criticised. He soon suffered a right calf injury and was subsequently ruled out for eight weeks with a grade two tear. He re-injured his calf at training in mid-December. The Kings struggled defensively in Lisch's absence and sat at the bottom of the NBL ladder for much of the season. He returned to the active roster in mid-January after missing 17 games. In his return game on January 13, Lisch recorded seven points and four rebounds in 15 minutes off the bench before fouling out of the Kings' 104–101 loss to the Adelaide 36ers. On February 15, he scored a season-high 18 points in a 90–73 win over the Brisbane Bullets. He helped the Kings to six wins in their last seven games. Despite the late season surge, the Kings missed the finals with an 11–17 record. In 11 games, Lisch averaged 11.1 points, 3.2 rebounds, 2.4 assists and 1.5 steals per game.

==== 2018–19 season ====
Lisch spent another off-season concentrating on getting healthy. On October 28, 2018, he scored a season-high 22 points with five 3-pointers in a 98–90 overtime win over the Cairns Taipans. On November 2, in his 200th NBL game, Lisch had 12 points, five rebounds, three assists and two blocks in an 86–79 win over the Illawarra Hawks. After colliding with a teammate and sustaining an elbow to his jaw at training on November 17, Lisch missed the Kings' game the following day. Lisch helped the Kings finish the regular season in third place with an 18–10 record, before going on to lose 2–0 to Melbourne United in the semi-finals. In 29 games during the 2018–19 NBL season, he averaged 14.1 points, 2.5 rebounds, 3.2 assists and 1.4 steals per game.

==== 2019–20 season ====
On March 29, 2019, Lisch re-signed with the Kings on a multi-year deal. He had opportunities to join the South East Melbourne Phoenix and the Illawarra Hawks during the off-season but decided to take a pay cut and re-commit to the Kings. Lisch suffered a left ankle fracture in Round 2 of the 2019–20 season and was subsequently ruled out for two months. He returned to action in Round 10, but further ankle soreness saw him miss the next six rounds. He returned to the line-up once again on February 1 against the Perth Wildcats after two months on the sidelines. He played the final three games of the regular season to help the Kings win the minor premiership with a first-place finish and a 20–8 record. The Kings went on to defeat Melbourne United 2–1 in the semi-finals to reach the NBL Grand Final. In game one of the grand final series against the Wildcats, Lisch scored 17 points in an 88–86 loss. The best-of-five grand final series was called off by Sydney, with the Kings down 2–1, due to the coronavirus pandemic. The Kings were subsequently deemed runners-up for the season.

Lisch's ankle injury early in the season led to an exacerbation of a pre-existing ankle condition. He subsequently underwent surgery following the season, with the recommendation from multiple medical specialists being that he should avoid further impact activities following the surgery. As a result, on June 9, 2020, Lisch announced his retirement from basketball.

== National team career ==
In May 2016, Lisch was named in the Australian national team's 17-man squad for a selection camp in Melbourne in July ahead of the Rio Olympics. He was subsequently named in the final 12-man squad, joining former Perth Wildcats teammate Damian Martin as Olympic debutants. Lisch became the first Olympic basketball player from SLU since Pete McCaffrey (1964) and Dick Boushka (1956). Lisch was a key reserve for the Boomers during their Olympic campaign, helping Australia reach the bronze medal game. There the Boomers lost a closely contested game to Spain. Australia's fourth-place finish matched their best-ever finish in the Olympics. Lisch appeared in all eight games for Australia, averaging 2.6 points, 1.6 rebounds and 1.5 assists in 14 minutes per game. He scored seven points in Australia's opening game win against France, and had six rebounds in the bronze medal game against Spain.

In June 2017, Lisch was named in a 20-man Boomers training camp squad ahead of the 2017 FIBA Asia Cup. However, due to injury, he was not named in the final 12-man squad. Lisch returned to the Boomers squad in February 2018 for the FIBA World Cup qualifiers. He continued on with the Boomers for their final World Cup qualifying matches in June.

== Coaching career ==
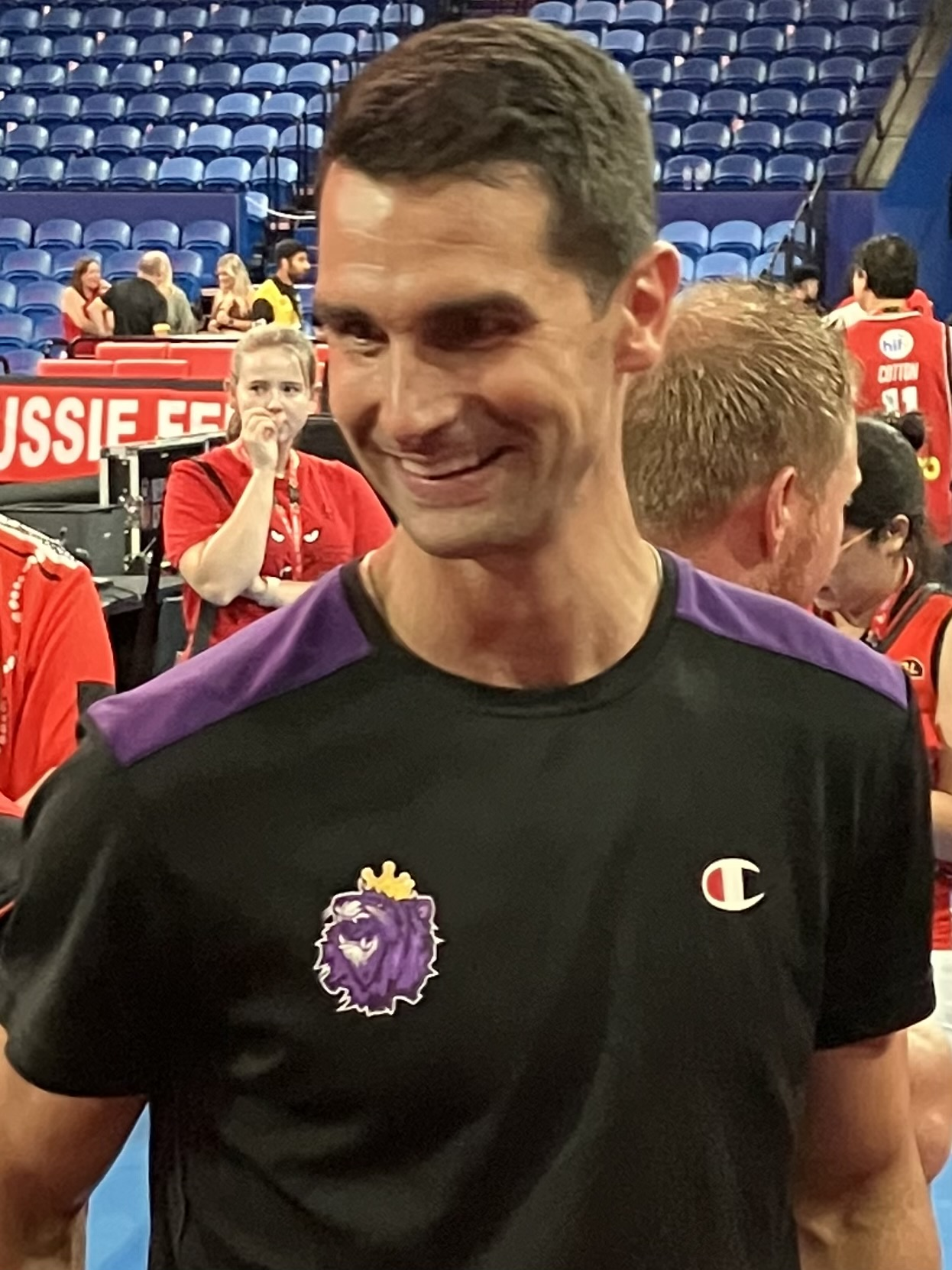
Lisch in January 2023 at RAC Arena following the Kings' loss to the Perth Wildcats

In December 2020, Lisch was appointed assistant coach and player welfare manager of the Sydney Kings for the 2020–21 NBL season under head coach Adam Forde. In July 2021, he was re-appointed assistant coach of the Kings for the 2021–22 NBL season under new coach Chase Buford. He helped the Kings win the championship in May 2022. In December 2022, he made his NBL head coaching debut, assuming the head coaching responsibilities for a round 13 game against the Tasmania JackJumpers after Buford was suspended for one game. The Kings went on to win the 2022–23 championship. He parted ways with the Kings on June 15, 2023, to pursue opportunities outside of basketball in the United States.

== Personal life ==
Lisch is the son of Rusty and Cathy Lisch. His father was a standout prep basketball player before choosing football and going on to play in the National Football League (NFL) as a quarterback. Lisch has an older sister Stephanie, a younger sister Theresa, and a younger brother Daniel.

Lisch holds an Italian passport thanks to his mother's Italian heritage. He first applied for an Italian passport in 2011. In March 2016, he became an Australian citizen.

Lisch and his Australian wife Rachel (née Watman) married in 2012. The couple met while Rachel was playing for the West Coast Waves in the Women's National Basketball League (WNBL). They have four children: Benjamin, Sofia, and twins Isabel and Isaac.

In June 2023, Lisch and his family moved to St. Louis, Missouri, where he began working for a wealth firm.
