= Mike Kelly (basketball) =

American-Australian professional basketball coach and former player

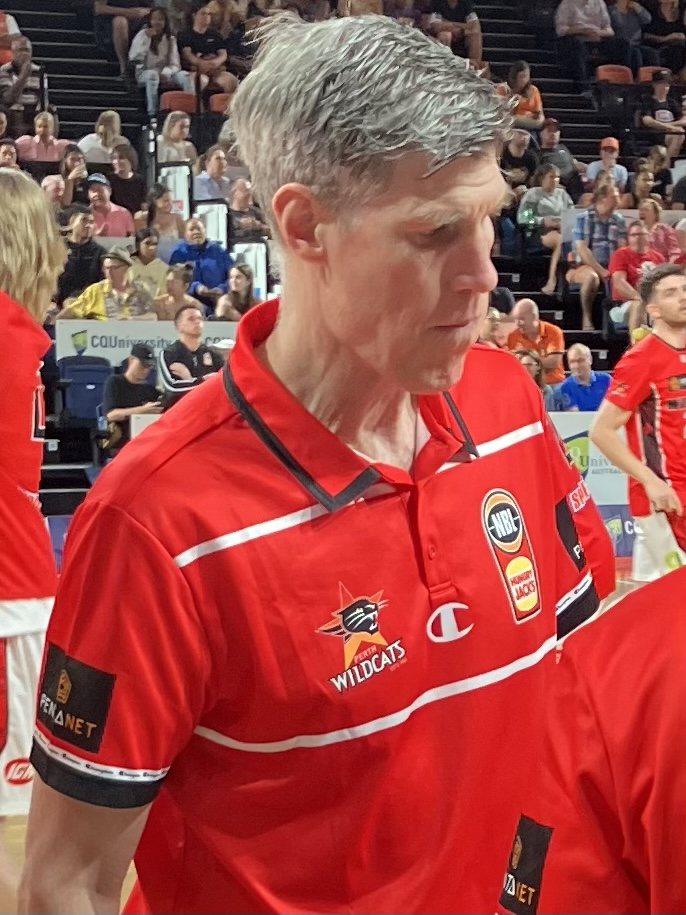
- Kelly with the Perth Wildcats in 2022

Personal information
- Born: 20 November 1967 (age 58) Orange County, California, U.S.
- Listed height: 196 cm (6 ft 5 in)
- Listed weight: 96 kg (212 lb)

Career information
- High school: Mater Dei (Santa Ana, California)
- College: Orange Coast (1985–1987); Westmont (1987–1989)
- NBA draft: 1989: undrafted
- Playing career: 1989–2006
- Position: Small forward / shooting guard
- Coaching career: 2005–present

Career history

Playing
- 1989: Lucky Cement Basketball Team
- 1990: Griffith Demons
- 1991–1993: North East Melbourne Arrows
- 1993: Hobart Devils
- 1994–1995: Nunawading Spectres
- 1994; 1996–1998: S.E. Melbourne Magic
- 1998–1999: Victoria Titans
- 1999–2004: Townsville Crocodiles
- 2004–2006: Wollongong Hawks

Coaching
- 2005–2006: Wollongong Hawks (assistant)
- 2006–2008: Vanguard (assistant)
- 2008–2013: Utah Valley (assistant)
- 2013–2015: Townsville Crocodiles (assistant)
- 2015–2018: Melbourne United (assistant)
- 2018–2021: Cairns Taipans
- 2021–2023: Perth Wildcats (associate HC)
- 2023–2024: South East Melbourne Phoenix
- 2025: Otago Nuggets
- 2025: Shenzhen Leopards
- 2025–2026: Shenzhen Leopards (assistant)

Career highlights
- As player: NBL champion (1996); NBL Grand Final MVP (1996); 2× NBL Best Defensive Player (1997, 1998); ABA national champion (1993); 2× All-GSAC Team (1988, 1989); As head coach: NBL Coach of the Year (2020); As assistant coach: NBL champion (2018)

Michael Clancy Kelly (born 20 November 1967) is an American-Australian professional basketball coach and former player. He played college basketball for Orange Coast College and Westmont College before playing professionally in Australia. He played 13 seasons in the National Basketball League (NBL) between 1993 and 2006, winning an NBL championship with the South East Melbourne Magic in 1996 while earning grand final MVP honours. In 1997 and 1998, he earned back-to-back NBL Best Defensive Player selection. He moved into coaching after retiring as a player, where he served as a college assistant for seven years before returning to the NBL in 2013. In 2018, he won an NBL championship as an assistant with Melbourne United. Two years later, he won NBL Coach of the Year as head coach of the Cairns Taipans. He was appointed head coach of the South East Melbourne Phoenix in 2023 but left in October 2024 after starting the 2024–25 NBL season with a 0–5 record.

== Early life ==
Kelly was born in Orange County, California. He grew up in Costa Mesa, California, and attended Mater Dei High School in Santa Ana. He helped the basketball team earn the 1985 CIF Championship with a 29–0 record.

== High school and college ==
Kelly began his collegiate career at Orange Coast College in Costa Mesa. Following a two-year tenure at OCC, he was recruited to play at Westmont College in the GSAC. Kelly served as team captain for the Warriors and was a two-time All-GSAC player. He helped Westmont win the 1988 NAIA District III Championship, with the team earning a trip to the NAIA National Tournament. In 50 games with the Warriors, he averaged 14.2 points per game, 17th on the Warriors all-time list. He also averaged 5.5 rebounds, 3.8 assists and 1.5 steals per game. He graduated from Westmont in 1989 with an economics and business degree.

== Professional career ==
Following his college career, Kelly spent one year in Taiwan playing for the Lucky Cement Basketball Team before moving to Australia. He first played for the Griffith Demons in New South Wales state league division two before playing in the South East Australian Basketball League (SEABL) for the North East Melbourne Arrows (1991–1993) and the Nunawading Spectres (1994–1995). The Arrows won the 1993 ABA national championship.

Kelly debuted in the National Basketball League (NBL) during the 1993 season with a two-game stint with the Hobart Devils. During the 1994 NBL season, he had a two-game stint with the South East Melbourne Magic. His first full season in the NBL came during the 1996 season, playing 33 games for the South East Melbourne Magic and helping the team win the NBL championship. In the 1996 grand final series, Kelly was a defensive linchpin and stopped Melbourne Tigers' star Andrew Gaze, subsequently earning grand final MVP honors. He continued with the Magic in the 1997 season and the 1998 season, where he won the NBL Best Defensive Player both years.

For the 1998–99 NBL season, Kelly joined the Victoria Titans.

For the 1999–2000 NBL season, Kelly joined the Townsville Crocodiles. He played five seasons for the Crocodiles.

For the 2004–05 NBL season, Kelly joined the Wollongong Hawks. He spent two seasons with the Hawks, playing 37 games in 2004–05 and four games in 2005–06. He also served as assistant coach with the Hawks in 2005–06.

== Coaching career ==
After his final NBL season, Kelly returned to the U.S. for seven years, where he served as an assistant coach in the college ranks. His first season was in 2006–07 with Vanguard University under head coach Fred Litzenberger. After two years at the NAIA level, Kelly joined Utah Valley University for the 2008–09 season. He spent five seasons with Utah Valley at the NCAA Division I level.

Kelly returned to Australia in 2013. He served as an assistant coach with the Townsville Crocodiles in 2013–14 and 2014–15.

For the 2015–16 NBL season, Kelly joined Melbourne United as an assistant coach. He served in the role for three seasons, helping United win the 2017–18 NBL championship.

In April 2018, Kelly was appointed head coach of the Cairns Taipans. The team endured a 14-game losing streak in the 2018–19 NBL season and finished last with a 6–22 record.

In his second year in Cairns, Kelly's team improved to third on the ladder with a 16–12 record. He was subsequently named NBL Coach of the Year for the 2019–20 season. The Taipans went on to lose 2–1 to the Perth Wildcats in the semi-finals. Days after being named Coach of the Year, he re-signed with the club on a two-year deal.

In the 2020–21 NBL season, the Taipans returned to the bottom of the ladder with an 8–28 record. Kelly parted ways with the club in May 2021.

On 26 July 2021, Kelly was announced as the associate head coach of the Perth Wildcats on a two-year contract.

On 30 March 2023, Kelly was appointed head coach of the South East Melbourne Phoenix. In the 2023–24 NBL season, the Phoenix finished 10th with a league-worst 10–18 record. On 13 October 2024, he parted ways with the Phoenix after starting the 2024–25 NBL season with a 0–5 record.

On 23 January 2025, Kelly was appointed head coach of the Otago Nuggets of the New Zealand National Basketball League (NZNBL) for the 2025 season. The Nuggets finished in last place with three wins from 20 games. Kelly was not retained for the 2026 season.

On 30 November 2025, Kelly was appointed head coach of the Shenzhen Leopards of the Chinese Basketball Association (CBA). Shenzhen failed to advance from the group stage of the CBA Club Cup, finishing with a record of two wins and three losses, ranking 12th in the standings. On 24 December, he was demoted to assistant coach, with Zheng Yonggang being promoted to head coach.

== Personal life ==
Kelly and his wife Annette have three children.
