= 2015–16 NBL season =

Professional basketball season

- League: National Basketball League
- Season: 2015–16
- Dates: 7 October 2015 – 6 March 2016
- Teams: 8
- TV partners: Australia: Fox Sports; Nine Network; New Zealand: Sky Sport; Online: NBL TV

Regular season
- Season champions: Melbourne United
- Season MVP: (Australia) Kevin Lisch (Illawarra)

Finals
- Champions: Perth Wildcats (7th title)
- Runners-up: New Zealand Breakers
- Semi-finalists: Melbourne United; Illawarra Hawks
- Finals MVP: (Australia) Damian Martin (Perth)

Statistical leaders
Points	(United States) Jerome Randle (Adelaide)	23.0
Rebounds	(Australia) Daniel Johnson (Adelaide)	9.3
Assists	(United States) Cedric Jackson (New Zealand)	6.6

NBL seasons
- ← 2014–15 2016–17 →

The 2015–16 NBL season was the 38th season of competition since its establishment in 1979. A total of eight teams contested the league. The regular season was played between 7 October 2015 and 14 February 2016, followed by a post-season featuring the top four in late February and March 2016.

During the off-season the Wollongong Hawks reverted to their original name Illawarra Hawks which was last used in 1998.

Australian broadcast rights to the season are held by Fox Sports, in the first year of a five-year deal, with one game per week simulcast on the Nine Network. In New Zealand Sky Sport are the official league broadcaster.

== Pre-season ==
=== 2015 NBL Pre-Season Blitz ===
A pre-season tournament featuring all eight teams was held on 24–27 September 2015 at Townsville RSL Stadium, Townsville. The winner will receive the third annual Loggins-Bruton Cup.

23 September 2015	Cairns Taipans	68–61	Perth Wildcats	Townsville RSL Stadium, Townsville

23 September 2015	Townsville Crocodiles	75–79	New Zealand Breakers	Townsville RSL Stadium, Townsville

24 September 2015	Melbourne United	106–99	Illawarra Hawks	Townsville RSL Stadium, Townsville

24 September 2015	Adelaide 36ers	95–84	Sydney Kings	Townsville RSL Stadium, Townsville

25 September 2015	New Zealand Breakers	80–86	Perth Wildcats	Townsville RSL Stadium, Townsville

25 September 2015	Townsville Crocodiles	67–82	Cairns Taipans	Townsville RSL Stadium, Townsville

26 September 2015	Illawarra Hawks	78–73	Sydney Kings	Townsville RSL Stadium, Townsville

26 September 2015	Melbourne United	89–85	Adelaide 36ers	Townsville RSL Stadium, Townsville

26 September 2015	Cairns Taipans	105–100	New Zealand Breakers	Townsville RSL Stadium, Townsville

26 September 2015	Perth Wildcats	84–47	Townsville Crocodiles	Townsville RSL Stadium, Townsville

27 September 2015	Sydney Kings	56–92	Melbourne United	Townsville RSL Stadium, Townsville

27 September 2015	Adelaide 36ers	86–70	Illawarra Hawks	Townsville RSL Stadium, Townsville

Melbourne United are pre-season champions.

== Regular season ==
=== Round 1 ===
7 October 2015	Adelaide 36ers	90–71	New Zealand Breakers	Titanium Security Arena, Adelaide
Fox Sports				Attendance: 4,520

8 October 2015	Cairns Taipans	79–74	Illawarra Hawks	Cairns Convention Centre, Cairns
Fox Sports				Attendance: 3,750

9 October 2015	Townsville Crocodiles	84–99	Melbourne United	Townsville Entertainment Centre, Townsville
Fox Sports				Attendance: TBA

10 October 2015	Sydney Kings	87–63	Cairns Taipans	Qantas Credit Union Arena, Sydney
Fox Sports				Attendance: 5,505

10 October 2015	Adelaide 36ers	66–79	Perth Wildcats	Titanium Security Arena, Adelaide
Fox Sports				Attendance: 4,612

11 October 2015	New Zealand Breakers	89–81	Townsville Crocodiles	Vector Arena, Auckland
Sky Sport				Attendance: 5,294

11 October 2015	Melbourne United	93–81	Illawarra Hawks	Hisense Arena, Melbourne
Fox Sports				Attendance: 7,009

=== Round 2 ===
14 October 2015	Illawarra Hawks	96–75	New Zealand Breakers	WIN Entertainment Centre, Wollongong
Fox Sports				Attendance: 2,524

15 October 2015	Sydney Kings	77–80	Townsville Crocodiles	Qantas Credit Union Arena, Sydney
Fox Sports				Attendance: 3,050

16 October 2015	Melbourne United	84–75	Adelaide 36ers	Hisense Arena, Melbourne
Fox Sports				Attendance: 5,243

16 October 2015	Perth Wildcats	83–80	New Zealand Breakers	Perth Arena, Perth
Fox Sports				Attendance: 11,645

17 October 2015	Sydney Kings	86–100	Illawarra Hawks	Qantas Credit Union Arena, Sydney
Fox Sports				Attendance: TBA

17 October 2015	Cairns Taipans	80–74	Townsville Crocodiles	Cairns Convention Centre, Cairns
Fox Sports				Attendance: 4,850

=== Round 3 ===
21 October 2015	New Zealand Breakers	74–64	Sydney Kings	North Shore Events Centre, Auckland
Sky Sport				Attendance: 3,357

21 October 2015	Melbourne United	93–62	Townsville Crocodiles	Hisense Arena, Melbourne
Fox Sports				Attendance: TBA

22 October 2015	Adelaide 36ers	88–79	Cairns Taipans	Titanium Security Arena, Adelaide
Fox Sports				Attendance: 3,895

23 October 2015	Sydney Kings	80–91	Adelaide 36ers	Qantas Credit Union Arena, Sydney
Fox Sports				Attendance: TBA

23 October 2015	Perth Wildcats	63–66	Townsville Crocodiles	Perth Arena, Perth
Fox Sports				Attendance: 10,423

24 October 2015	Melbourne United	89–80	Cairns Taipans	Hisense Arena, Melbourne
Fox Sports				Attendance: TBA

25 October 2015	Illawarra Hawks	99–106	Perth Wildcats	WIN Entertainment Centre, Wollongong
Fox Sports				Attendance: TBA

=== Round 4 ===
28 October 2015	New Zealand Breakers	90–67	Cairns Taipans	Vector Arena, Auckland
Sky Sport				Attendance: 4,347

28 October 2015	Townsville Crocodiles	88–96	Illawarra Hawks	Townsville Entertainment Centre, Townsville
Fox Sports				Attendance: TBA

29 October 2015	Melbourne United	75–73	Perth Wildcats	Hisense Arena, Melbourne
Fox Sports				Attendance: 4,822

30 October 2015	Sydney Kings	87–78	Townsville Crocodiles	Qantas Credit Union Arena, Sydney
Fox Sports				Attendance: TBA

31 October 2015	Adelaide 36ers	101–104	Cairns Taipans	Titanium Security Arena, Adelaide
Fox Sports				Attendance: TBA

31 October 2015	Perth Wildcats	91–62	Illawarra Hawks	Perth Arena, Perth
Fox Sports				Attendance: 10,432

1 November 2015	Melbourne United	96–82	Sydney Kings	Hisense Arena, Melbourne
Fox Sports				Attendance: 8,464

=== Round 5 ===
4 November 2015	Townsville Crocodiles	89–77	Perth Wildcats	Townsville Entertainment Centre, Townsville
Fox Sports				Attendance: TBA

5 November 2015	New Zealand Breakers	98–88	Adelaide 36ers	North Shore Events Centre, Auckland
Sky Sport				Attendance: 3,170

5 November 2015	Sydney Kings	94–105	Melbourne United	Qantas Credit Union Arena, Sydney
Fox Sports				Attendance: 3,001

6 November 2015	Illawarra Hawks	96–88	Cairns Taipans	WIN Entertainment Centre, Wollongong
Fox Sports				Attendance: TBA

6 November 2015	Perth Wildcats	85–77	Townsville Crocodiles	Perth Arena, Perth
Fox Sports				Attendance: 10,809

7 November 2015	Adelaide 36ers	99–98	Sydney Kings	Titanium Security Arena, Adelaide
Fox Sports				Attendance: 5,460

8 November 2015	Melbourne United	87–86	New Zealand Breakers	Hisense Arena, Melbourne
Fox Sports				Attendance: 9,020

=== Round 6 ===
11 November 2015	Illawarra Hawks	96–99	Perth Wildcats	WIN Entertainment Centre, Wollongong
Fox Sports				Attendance: TBA

12 November 2015	Sydney Kings	106–84	Adelaide 36ers	Qantas Credit Union Arena, Sydney
Fox Sports				Attendance: 2,932

13 November 2015	New Zealand Breakers	88–80	Perth Wildcats	Vector Arena, Auckland
Sky Sport				Attendance: TBA

13 November 2015	Cairns Taipans	82–70	Melbourne United	Cairns Convention Centre, Cairns
Fox Sports				Attendance: 4,584

14 November 2015	Adelaide 36ers	89–65	Townsville Crocodiles	Titanium Security Arena, Adelaide
Fox Sports				Attendance: 5,975

=== Round 7 ===
18 November 2015	Adelaide 36ers	88–94	Perth Wildcats	Titanium Security Arena, Adelaide
Fox Sports				Attendance: 4,590

19 November 2015	Sydney Kings	74–86	New Zealand Breakers	Qantas Credit Union Arena, Sydney
Fox Sports				Attendance: TBA

20 November 2015	Melbourne United	78–82	Townsville Crocodiles	Hisense Arena, Melbourne
Fox Sports				Attendance: 6,288

21 November 2015	Adelaide 36ers	89–77	Illawarra Hawks	Titanium Security Arena, Adelaide
Fox Sports				Attendance: 5,569

22 November 2015	New Zealand Breakers	80–69	Melbourne United	Vector Arena, Auckland
Sky Sport				Attendance: TBA

22 November 2015	Perth Wildcats	91–90	Cairns Taipans	Perth Arena, Perth
Fox Sports				Attendance: 10,301

=== Round 8 ===
25 November 2015	Illawarra Hawks	96–90	Sydney Kings	WIN Entertainment Centre, Wollongong
Fox Sports				Attendance: TBA

26 November 2015	Townsville Crocodiles	63–66	Melbourne United	Townsville Entertainment Centre, Townsville
Fox Sports				Attendance: 2,795

27 November 2015	Cairns Taipans	83–88	Adelaide 36ers	Cairns Convention Centre, Cairns
Fox Sports				Attendance: 4,082

27 November 2015	Perth Wildcats	86–80	New Zealand Breakers	Perth Arena, Perth
Fox Sports				Attendance: 10,827

28 November 2015	Illawarra Hawks	108–70	Townsville Crocodiles	WIN Entertainment Centre, Wollongong
Fox Sports				Attendance: TBA

=== Round 9 ===
2 December 2015	New Zealand Breakers	99–78	Perth Wildcats	North Shore Events Centre, Auckland
Sky Sport				Attendance: TBA

2 December 2015	Townsville Crocodiles	96–70	Cairns Taipans	Townsville Entertainment Centre, Townsville
Fox Sports				Attendance: TBA

3 December 2015	Illawarra Hawks	102–87	Melbourne United	WIN Entertainment Centre, Wollongong
Fox Sports				Attendance: TBA

4 December 2015	Cairns Taipans	101–83	Sydney Kings	Cairns Convention Centre, Cairns
Fox Sports				Attendance: 3,721

4 December 2015	Perth Wildcats	90–72	Adelaide 36ers	Perth Arena, Perth
Fox Sports				Attendance: 10,284

5 December 2015	Townsville Crocodiles	75–86	New Zealand Breakers	Townsville Entertainment Centre, Townsville
Fox Sports				Attendance: TBA

6 December 2015	Melbourne United	89–86	Adelaide 36ers	Hisense Arena, Melbourne
Fox Sports				Attendance: 9,399

=== Round 10 ===
9 December 2015	Illawarra Hawks	97–82	Cairns Taipans	WIN Entertainment Centre, Wollongong
Fox Sports				Attendance: TBA

10 December 2015	Townsville Crocodiles	101–100	Adelaide 36ers	Townsville Entertainment Centre, Townsville
Fox Sports				Attendance: TBA

10 December 2015	Perth Wildcats	113–83	Melbourne United	Perth Arena, Perth
Fox Sports				Attendance: 10,530

11 December 2015	New Zealand Breakers	96–84	Sydney Kings	Vector Arena, Auckland
Sky Sport				Attendance: TBA

11 December 2015	Cairns Taipans	103–101 (2OT)	Illawarra Hawks	Cairns Convention Centre, Cairns
Fox Sports				Attendance: TBA

12 December 2015	Adelaide 36ers	76–66	Townsville Crocodiles	Titanium Security Arena, Adelaide
Fox Sports				Attendance: 5,638

13 December 2015	Sydney Kings	69–87	Perth Wildcats	Qantas Credit Union Arena, Sydney
Fox Sports				Attendance: 8,832

=== Round 11 ===
16 December 2015	Melbourne United	81–96	Sydney Kings	Hisense Arena, Melbourne
Fox Sports				Attendance: 7,344

17 December 2015	Cairns Taipans	70–73	Perth Wildcats	Cairns Convention Centre, Cairns
Fox Sports				Attendance: TBA

18 December 2015	Illawarra Hawks	102–83	Sydney Kings	WIN Entertainment Centre, Wollongong
Fox Sports				Attendance: TBA

19 December 2015	Townsville Crocodiles	75–58	Perth Wildcats	Townsville Entertainment Centre, Townsville
Fox Sports				Attendance: TBA

20 December 2015	New Zealand Breakers	83–107	Illawarra Hawks	Vector Arena, Auckland
Sky Sport				Attendance: TBA

=== Round 12 ===
23 December 2015	Adelaide 36ers	91–81	Melbourne United	Titanium Security Arena, Adelaide
Fox Sports				Attendance: 7,641

27 December 2015	Sydney Kings	83–93	New Zealand Breakers	Sydney Olympic Park Sports Centre, Sydney
Fox Sports				Attendance: 3,561

27 December 2015	Melbourne United	92–87	Perth Wildcats	Hisense Arena, Melbourne
Fox Sports				Attendance: 10,200

=== Round 13 ===
30 December 2015	Sydney Kings	90–100	Melbourne United	Sydney Olympic Park Sports Centre, Sydney
Fox Sports				Attendance: 3,446

31 December 2015	Cairns Taipans	73–66	New Zealand Breakers	Cairns Convention Centre, Cairns
Fox Sports				Attendance: TBA

31 December 2015	Townsville Crocodiles	74–98	Illawarra Hawks	Townsville Entertainment Centre, Townsville
Fox Sports				Attendance: 3,234

2 January 2016	Sydney Kings	87–77	Cairns Taipans	Sydney Olympic Park Sports Centre, Sydney
Fox Sports				Attendance: TBA

=== Round 14 ===
6 January 2016	Cairns Taipans	71–61	Perth Wildcats	Cairns Convention Centre, Cairns
Fox Sports				Attendance: TBA

7 January 2016	Melbourne United	97–96	Illawarra Hawks	State Netball and Hockey Centre, Melbourne
Fox Sports				Attendance: TBA

8 January 2016	New Zealand Breakers	81–87	Adelaide 36ers	North Shore Events Centre, Auckland
Sky Sport				Attendance: 3,951

8 January 2016	Cairns Taipans	75–61	Townsville Crocodiles	Cairns Convention Centre, Cairns
Fox Sports				Attendance: TBA

9 January 2016	Sydney Kings	90–114	Illawarra Hawks	Sydney Olympic Park Sports Centre, Sydney
Fox Sports				Attendance: TBA

=== Round 15 ===
13 January 2016	Cairns Taipans	65–83	Melbourne United	Cairns Convention Centre, Cairns
Fox Sports				Attendance: TBA

14 January 2016	Illawarra Hawks	87–69	New Zealand Breakers	WIN Entertainment Centre, Wollongong
Fox Sports				Attendance: 3,308

15 January 2016	Melbourne United	98–68	Cairns Taipans	State Netball and Hockey Centre, Melbourne
Fox Sports				Attendance: TBA

15 January 2016	Perth Wildcats	95–68	Sydney Kings	Perth Arena, Perth
Fox Sports				Attendance: 11,370

16 January 2016	Townsville Crocodiles	103–108	Adelaide 36ers	Townsville Entertainment Centre, Townsville
Fox Sports				Attendance: TBA

17 January 2016	New Zealand Breakers	96–103 (2OT)	Illawarra Hawks	Vector Arena, Auckland
Sky Sport				Attendance: TBA

=== Round 16 ===
20 January 2016	Adelaide 36ers	96–89	Sydney Kings	Titanium Security Arena, Adelaide
Fox Sports				Attendance: 6,980

21 January 2016	Townsville Crocodiles	89–66	New Zealand Breakers	Townsville Entertainment Centre, Townsville
Fox Sports				Attendance: TBA

21 January 2016	Perth Wildcats	95–72	Illawarra Hawks	Perth Arena, Perth
Fox Sports				Attendance: 11,104

22 January 2016	Adelaide 36ers	90–81	Melbourne United	Titanium Security Arena, Adelaide
Fox Sports				Attendance: 6,950

23 January 2016	Cairns Taipans	90–87	New Zealand Breakers	Cairns Convention Centre, Cairns
Fox Sports				Attendance: TBA

=== Round 17 ===
25 January 2016	Perth Wildcats	84–74	Cairns Taipans	Perth Arena, Perth
Fox Sports				Attendance: 11,450

27 January 2016	Townsville Crocodiles	96–88	Sydney Kings	Townsville Entertainment Centre, Townsville
Fox Sports				Attendance: TBA

28 January 2016	Illawarra Hawks	104–97	Adelaide 36ers	WIN Entertainment Centre, Wollongong
Fox Sports				Attendance: TBA

29 January 2016	New Zealand Breakers	77–74	Townsville Crocodiles	Vector Arena, Auckland
Sky Sport				Attendance: 5,562

29 January 2016	Cairns Taipans	81–76	Sydney Kings	Cairns Convention Centre, Cairns
Fox Sports				Attendance: TBA

29 January 2016	Perth Wildcats	85–91 (OT)	Melbourne United	Perth Arena, Perth
Fox Sports				Attendance: 12,009

30 January 2016	Adelaide 36ers	104–90	Illawarra Hawks	Titanium Security Arena, Adelaide
Fox Sports				Attendance: 7,493

=== Round 18 ===
3 February 2016	Adelaide 36ers	84–106	New Zealand Breakers	Titanium Security Arena, Adelaide
Fox Sports				Attendance: 5,308

4 February 2016	Illawarra Hawks	73–80	Melbourne United	WIN Entertainment Centre, Wollongong
Fox Sports				Attendance: TBA

5 February 2016	Cairns Taipans	95–89	Adelaide 36ers	Cairns Convention Centre, Cairns
Fox Sports				Attendance: TBA

5 February 2016	Perth Wildcats	95–81	Sydney Kings	Perth Arena, Perth
Fox Sports				Attendance: 11,430

6 February 2016	Illawarra Hawks	104–97 (OT)	Townsville Crocodiles	WIN Entertainment Centre, Wollongong
Fox Sports				Attendance: TBA

7 February 2016	New Zealand Breakers	85–74	Cairns Taipans	North Shore Events Centre, Auckland
Sky Sport				Attendance: TBA

=== Round 19 ===
10 February 2016	Sydney Kings	103–77	Perth Wildcats	Sydney Olympic Park Sports Centre, Sydney
Fox Sports				Attendance: TBA

11 February 2016	Townsville Crocodiles	85–68	Cairns Taipans	Townsville Entertainment Centre, Townsville
Fox Sports				Attendance: TBA

12 February 2016	New Zealand Breakers	100–63	Melbourne United	North Shore Events Centre, Auckland
Sky Sport				Attendance: TBA

12 February 2016	Illawarra Hawks	106–95	Adelaide 36ers	WIN Entertainment Centre, Wollongong
Fox Sports				Attendance: TBA

13 February 2016	Townsville Crocodiles	126–123 (OT)	Sydney Kings	Townsville Entertainment Centre, Townsville
Fox Sports				Attendance: 2,500

14 February 2016	Melbourne United	68–70	New Zealand Breakers	Hisense Arena, Melbourne
Fox Sports				Attendance: 10,200

14 February 2016	Perth Wildcats	100–84	Adelaide 36ers	Perth Arena, Perth
Fox Sports				Attendance: 12,139

== Ladder ==
Pos	2015–16 NBL season											
Pos	Team	Pld	W	L	PCT	Last 5	Streak	Home	Away	PF	PA	PP
1	Melbourne United^{1}	28	18	10	64.29%	2–3	L2	11–3	7–7	2384	2342	101.79%
2	Perth Wildcats^{1}	28	18	10	64.29%	3–2	W1	12–2	6–8	2391	2266	105.52%
3	Illawarra Hawks	28	17	11	60.71%	3–2	W2	11–3	6–8	2637	2486	106.07%
4	New Zealand Breakers	28	16	12	57.14%	5–0	W5	11–3	5–9	2357	2282	103.29%
5	Adelaide 36ers	28	14	14	50.00%	1–4	L4	10–4	4–10	2495	2500	99.80%
6	Cairns Taipans	28	12	16	42.86%	2–3	L2	11–3	1–13	2238	2354	95.07%
7	Townsville Crocodiles	28	11	17	39.29%	3–2	W2	8–6	3–11	2271	2390	95.02%
8	Sydney Kings	28	6	22	21.43%	1–4	L1	5–9	1–13	2416	2569	94.04%

Updated to match(es) played on 14 February 2016. Source: NBL.com.au

The NBL tie-breaker system as outlined in the NBL Rules and Regulations states that in the case of an identical win–loss record, the results in games played between the teams will determine order of seeding.

^{1}Melbourne United won Head-to-Head (3-1).

=== Ladder Progression ===
- Numbers highlighted in green indicate that the team finished the round inside the top four.
- Numbers highlighted in blue indicates the team finished first on the ladder in that round.
- Numbers highlighted in red indicates the team finished last place on the ladder in that round.

2015–16 NBL season
Team	1	2	3	4	5	6	7	8	9	10	11	12	13	14	15	16	17	18	19
Adelaide 36ers	4	6	3	3	4	4	4	4	5	5	5	5	5	5	4	4	4	5	5
Cairns Taipans	6	3	6	6	6	6	6	6	6	6	6	6	6	6	6	6	6	6	6
Illawarra Hawks	7	4	4	5	5	5	5	5	4	4	4	4	3	3	2	3	3	3	3
Melbourne United	3	1	1	1	1	1	1	1	1	2	2	3	2	1	1	1	1	1	1
New Zealand Breakers	5	8	5	4	3	3	3	3	3	3	3	2	4	4	5	5	5	4	4
Perth Wildcats	2	2	2	2	2	2	2	2	2	1	1	1	1	2	3	2	2	2	2
Sydney Kings	1	5	8	7	8	7	8	8	8	8	8	8	8	8	8	8	8	8	8
Townsville Crocodiles	8	7	7	8	7	8	7	7	7	7	7	7	7	7	7	7	7	7	7

== Finals ==
The 2015–16 National Basketball League Finals were played in late February and March 2016, consisting of two best-of-three semi-final and final series, where the higher seed hosts the first and third games.

=== Playoff Seedings ===
1. Melbourne United
2. Perth Wildcats
3. Illawarra Hawks
4. New Zealand Breakers

The NBL tie-breaker system as outlined in the NBL Rules and Regulations states that in the case of an identical win–loss record, the results in games played between the teams will determine order of seeding.

=== Playoff bracket ===
Semifinals
1	Melbourne United	82	78	X
4	New Zealand Breakers	91	91	X
2	Perth Wildcats	80	87	89
3	Illawarra Hawks	68	104	74

Grand Final
2	Perth Wildcats	82	68	75
4	New Zealand Breakers	76	72	52

=== Semi-finals ===
18 February 2016	Melbourne United	82–91	New Zealand Breakers	Hisense Arena, Melbourne
Fox Sports				Attendance: 5,532

19 February 2016	Perth Wildcats	80–68	Illawarra Hawks	Perth Arena, Perth
Fox Sports				Attendance: 8,700

20 February 2016	New Zealand Breakers	91–78	Melbourne United	Vector Arena, Auckland
Sky Sport				Attendance: TBA

21 February 2016	Illawarra Hawks	104–87	Perth Wildcats	WIN Entertainment Centre, Wollongong
Fox Sports				Attendance: TBA

26 February 2016	Perth Wildcats	89–74	Illawarra Hawks	Perth Arena, Perth
Fox Sports				Attendance: TBA

=== Grand final ===
2 March 2016	Perth Wildcats	82–76	New Zealand Breakers	Perth Arena, Perth
Fox Sports				Attendance: TBA

4 March 2016	New Zealand Breakers	72–68	Perth Wildcats	North Shore Events Centre, Auckland
Sky Sport				Attendance: TBA

6 March 2016	Perth Wildcats	75–52	New Zealand Breakers	Perth Arena, Perth
Fox Sports				Attendance: 13,090

== Awards ==
=== Player of the Month ===
Month	Player	Team
October	Chris Goulding	Melbourne United
November	Corey Webster	New Zealand Breakers
December	Kevin Lisch	Illawarra Hawks
January	Jerome Randle	Adelaide 36ers
February	Cedric Jackson	New Zealand Breakers

=== Coach of the Month ===
Month	Player	Team
October	Dean Demopoulos	Melbourne United
November	Dean Vickerman	New Zealand Breakers
December	Rob Beveridge	Illawarra Hawks
January	Joey Wright	Adelaide 36ers
February	Dean Vickerman	New Zealand Breakers

=== Pre-season ===
- Most Valuable Player (Ray Borner Medal): Stephen Holt, Melbourne United & Markel Starks, Cairns Taipans

=== Season ===
- Most Valuable Player (Andrew Gaze Trophy): Kevin Lisch, Illawarra Hawks
- Rookie of the Year: Nick Kay, Townsville Crocodiles
- Best Defensive Player: Kevin Lisch, Illawarra Hawks
- Best Sixth Man: Hakim Warrick, Melbourne United
- Most Improved Player: Clint Steindl, Townsville Crocodiles
- Coach of the Year (Lindsay Gaze Trophy): Shawn Dennis, Townsville Crocodiles
- Referee of the Year: Vaughan Mayberry
- All-NBL First Team:
  - Jerome Randle – Adelaide 36ers
  - Kevin Lisch – Illawarra Hawks
  - Chris Goulding – Melbourne United
  - Daniel Kickert – Melbourne United
  - Andrew Ogilvy – Illawarra Hawks
- All-NBL Second Team:
  - Stephen Holt – Melbourne United
  - Corey Webster – New Zealand Breakers
  - Kirk Penney – Illawarra Hawks
  - Matthew Knight – Perth Wildcats
  - Daniel Johnson – Adelaide 36ers

=== Finals ===
- Grand Final Series MVP (Larry Sengstock Medal): Damian Martin, Perth Wildcats
