= Damian Martin =

Australian basketball player

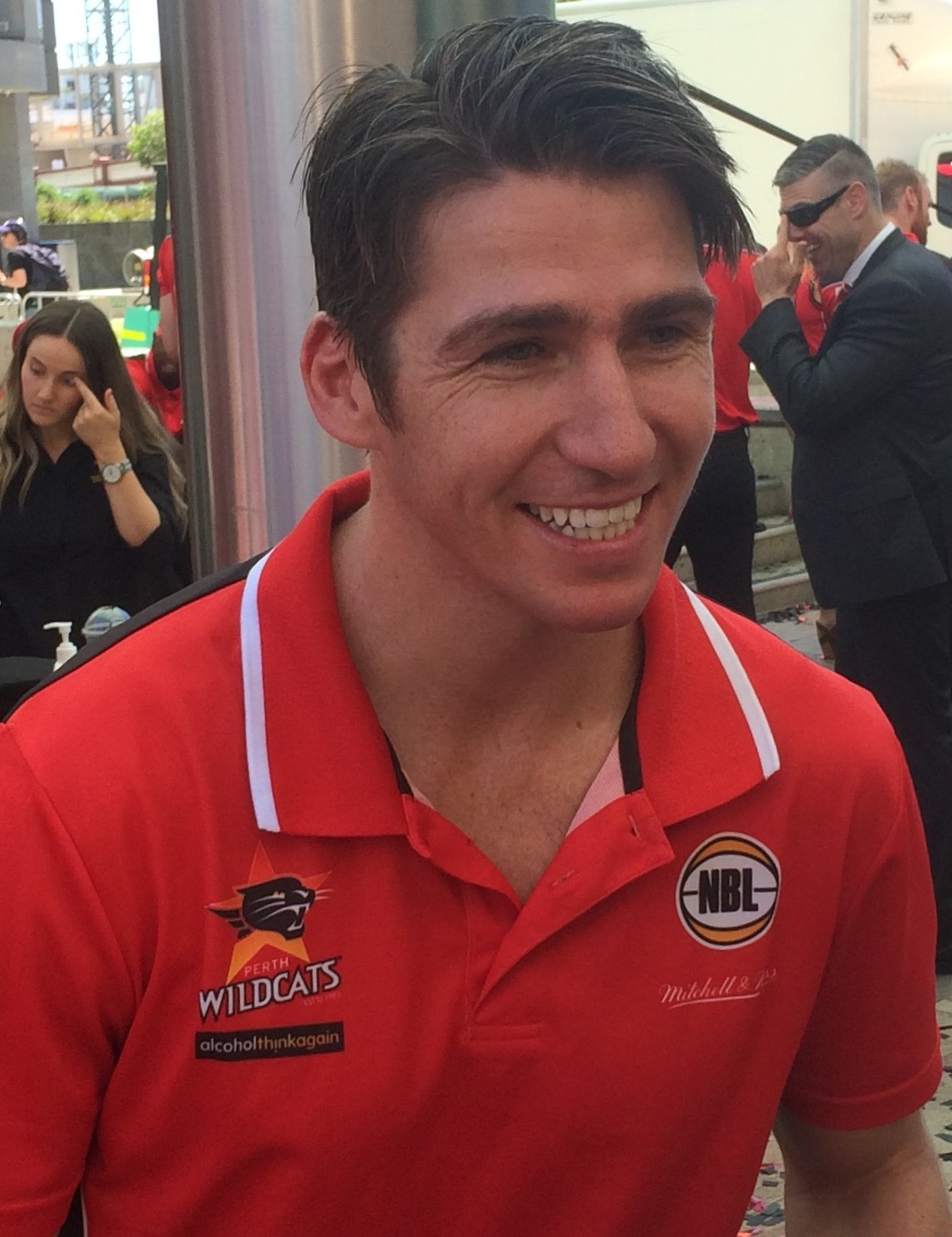
- Martin with the Perth Wildcats 2017

Personal information
- Born: 5 September 1984 (age 42) Gloucester, New South Wales, Australia
- Listed height: 186 cm (6 ft 1 in)
- Listed weight: 91 kg (201 lb)

Career information
- High school: Gloucester (Gloucester, New South Wales); Lake Ginninderra (Canberra, ACT)
- College: Loyola Marymount (2003–2007)
- NBA draft: 2008: undrafted
- Playing career: 2002–2020
- Position: Point guard

Career history
- 2002–2003: Australian Institute of Sport
- 2007–2009: West Sydney Razorbacks / Sydney Spirit
- 2009: Parramatta Wildcats
- 2009–2020: Perth Wildcats
- 2010: East Perth Eagles

Career highlights
- 6× NBL champion (2010, 2014, 2016, 2017, 2019, 2020); NBL Grand Final MVP (2016); 6× NBL Best Defensive Player (2011–2015, 2018); All-NBL First Team (2011); 2× All-NBL Second Team (2013, 2014); All-NBL Third Team (2012); WCC Defensive Player of the Year (2007); WCC All-Freshman Team (2004); No. 53 retired by Perth Wildcats
Medals
Men's basketball
Representing Australia
Commonwealth Games
Gold medal – first place	2018 Gold Coast	Team competition
FIBA U19 World Cup
Gold medal – first place	2003 Greece	Team

Damian Patrick Martin (born 5 September 1984) is an Australian former professional basketball player. He played four years of college basketball in the United States for the Loyola Marymount Lions before playing 13 years in the National Basketball League (NBL). After two seasons with the West Sydney Razorbacks / Sydney Spirit, he joined the Perth Wildcats in 2009 and won six NBL championships in 11 seasons. He also won the NBL Best Defensive Player Award six times, leading to the league naming the trophy after him upon his retirement.

== Early life and career ==
Martin was born in Gloucester, New South Wales. He attended Gloucester High School, where he initially played rugby league.

As a 15-year-old at the NSW Institute of Sport, Martin was encouraged by Rob Beveridge to concentrate on basketball. He later moved to Canberra to attend the Australian Institute of Sport (AIS) and Lake Ginninderra Secondary College.

In 2002 and 2003, Martin played for the AIS men's team in the South East Australian Basketball League (SEABL). He subsequently went on to play for the Australian national junior team at the 2003 FIBA Under-19 World Championship, where he won a gold medal.

== College career ==
Between 2003 and 2007, Martin played college basketball in the United States for the Loyola Marymount Lions. As a freshman in 2003–04, he was earned WCC All-Freshman Team honours. An Achilles tendon injury saw him miss the entire 2005–06 season. He returned to the team for the 2006–07 season and was the WCC Defensive Player of the Year. Martin was eligible for a fifth season in 2007–08 but elected to pursue a professional career. In three seasons, he played 88 games with 69 starts and averaged 4.6 points, 3.9 rebounds, 3.2 assists and 1.8 steals per game.

== Professional career ==
=== West Sydney Razorbacks / Sydney Spirit (2007–2009) ===
Martin began his professional career with the West Sydney Razorbacks of the National Basketball League, but suffered a season-ending knee injury ten games into the 2007–08 NBL season.

Following the Sydney Kings' withdrawal from the NBL, the Razorbacks re-branded as the Sydney Spirit for the 2008–09 season. Martin subsequently returned to the franchise for a second season. The Spirit quickly fell into financial difficulty and were saved from collapse mid season thanks to a rescue package from the NBL. The players and coaches all took significant pay cuts, with the entire team agreeing to live off just $150,000 between them to keep the franchise going—roughly $700 per week for Martin. Furthermore, Martin played much of the season with a broken wrist.

In the 2009 off-season, Martin played for the Parramatta Wildcats in the Waratah League.

=== Perth Wildcats (2009–2020) ===
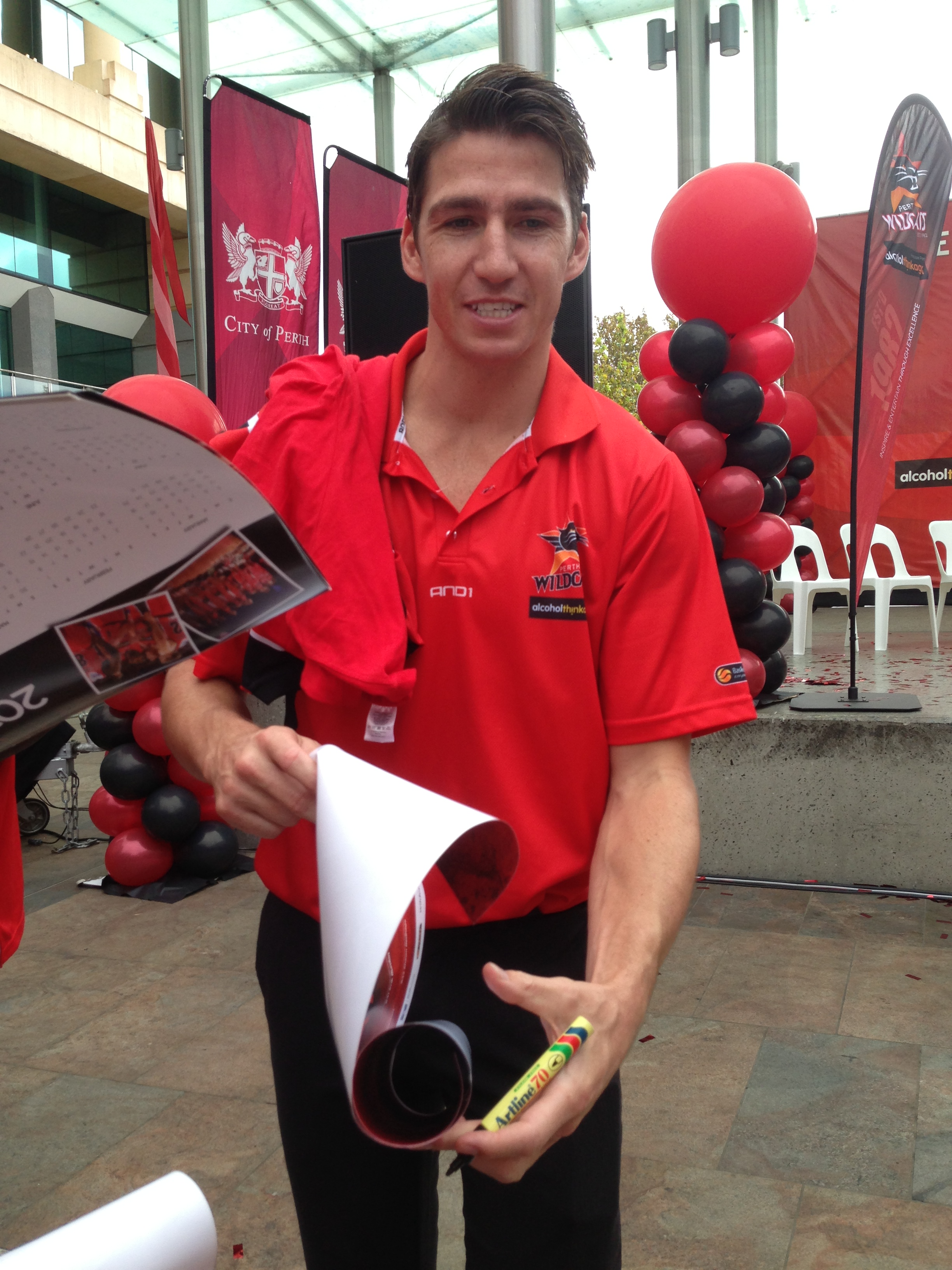
Martin in April 2014, at the Wildcats' championship ceremony

Martin joined the Perth Wildcats for the 2009–10 NBL season. In his first season, he helped the Wildcats finish the regular season in first place with a 17–11 record and reach the NBL Grand Final. In the grand final series, the Wildcats defeated the Wollongong Hawks 2–1 to win the championship.

In the 2010 off-season, Martin played for the East Perth Eagles in the State Basketball League.

In the 2010–11 season, Martin won the NBL Best Defensive Player Award and was named to the All-NBL First Team. The Wildcats finished fourth with a 16–12 record and lost 2–1 in the semi-finals to the New Zealand Breakers.

In the 2011–12 season, Martin won his second straight NBL Best Defensive Player Award. He helped the Wildcats reach the NBL Grand Final series, where they lost 2–1 to the New Zealand Breakers.

In the 2012–13 season, Martin won his third straight NBL Best Defensive Player Award. In January 2013, Martin was named co-captain of the Wildcats alongside Shawn Redhage. He missed the 2013 grand final series with a partial tear of his Achilles tendon.

For the 2013–14 season, Martin was named sole captain of the Wildcats. He won his fourth straight NBL Best Defensive Player Award. He helped the Wildcats reach a third straight grand final, where they defeated the Adelaide 36ers 2–1 to win the NBL championship.

On 14 May 2014, Martin re-signed with the Wildcats on a two-year deal (with the option of a third). In October 2014, he had a game with nine steals, the second most in club history behind Ricky Grace's 10 in 1990. He was subsequently named Player of the Week for round three. He played his 200th NBL game during the 2014–15 season and won his fifth straight NBL Best Defensive Player Award.

On 4 November 2015, Martin suffered a broken jaw and missing teeth following an errant elbow from Townsville Crocodiles forward Brian Conklin. He played his 200th game for the Wildcats during the 2015–16 NBL season. The team finished second with an 18–10 record and defeated the Illawarra Hawks 2–1 in the semi-finals. In the grand final series, the Wildcats defeated the New Zealand Breakers 2–1 to win the NBL championship. Martin was named Grand Final MVP.

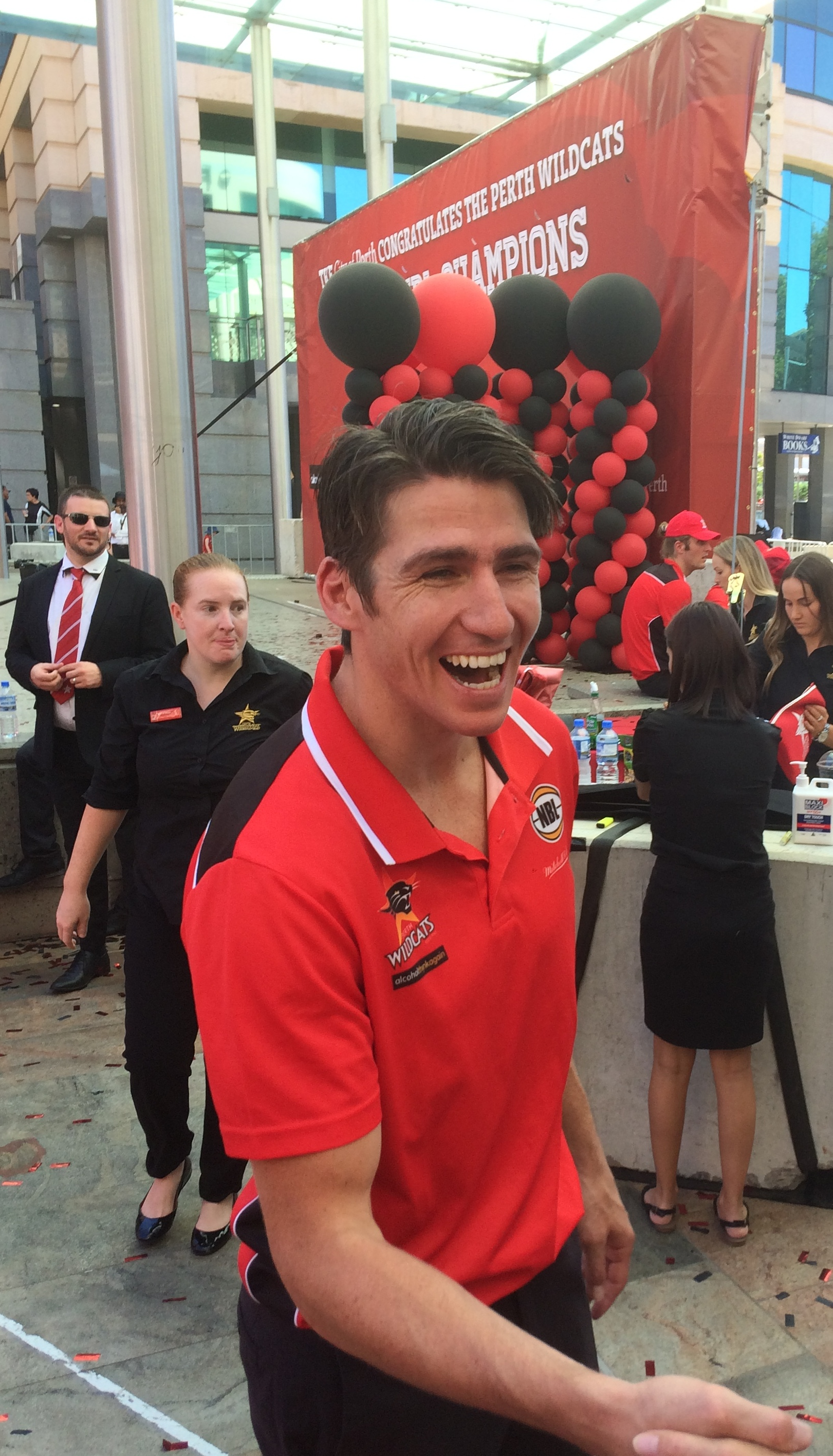
Martin in March 2017

On 2 June 2016, Martin signed a new three-year deal with the Wildcats. He was sidelined early in the 2016–17 NBL season with a head and knee injury. He played his 250th NBL game in January. The Wildcats finished the regular season in third place with a 15–13 record, and played the second-seeded Cairns Taipans in the semi-finals, a series the Wildcats swept 2–0. The series sweep advanced the Wildcats into the NBL Grand Final for the sixth time in eight years. In the best-of-five grand final series against the Illawarra Hawks, Martin helped the Wildcats win 3–0 to claim the championship.

Martin played his 250th game for the Wildcats during the 2017–18 NBL season and won the NBL Best Defensive Player Award for a record-breaking sixth time.

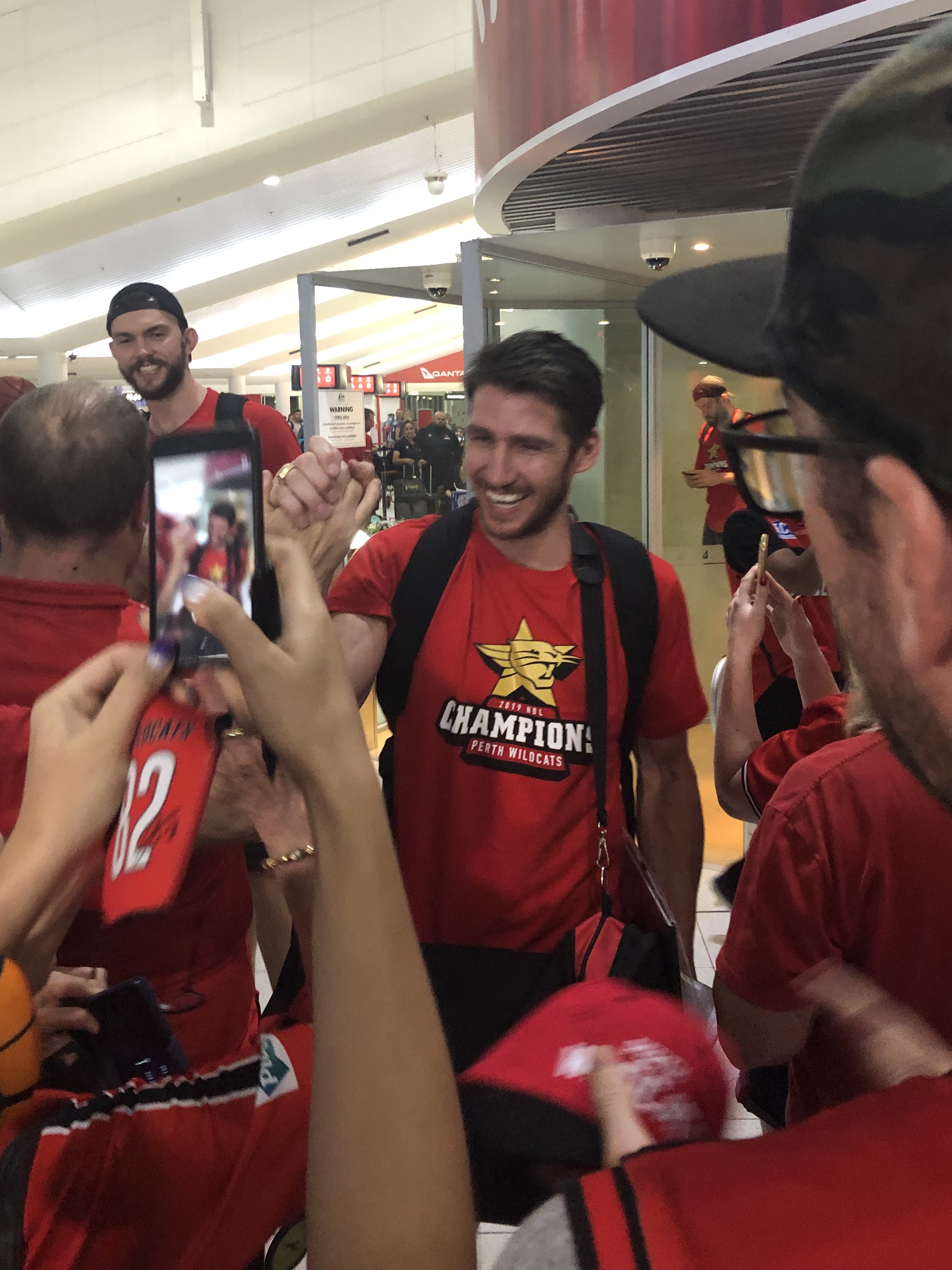
Martin in March 2019, arriving back in Perth after winning his fifth NBL championship

In the 2018–19 NBL season, Martin missed six games early with a low grade tear to his right calf muscle. Coach Trevor Gleeson credited Martin's late-season form as one of the key reasons for the Wildcats riding a wave of momentum towards the finals. The Wildcats finished with an 18–10 record to claim the minor premiership, before going on to reach the NBL Grand Final series, where they defeated Melbourne United 3–1 to win the championship. Martin and long-time teammate Jesse Wagstaff became the first players in NBL history to win five championships with just one club.

On 5 April 2019, Martin re-signed with the Wildcats for the 2019–20 season. In December 2019, he played his 300th game for the Wildcats. He missed the entire month of January with a left heel injury, returning for the final two regular season games. In March 2020, he was crowned an NBL champion for the sixth time, becoming one of just four players in NBL history to win six titles, with he and teammate Jesse Wagstaff the only to do it at one club. Following the season, it was revealed Martin had played through the year with an Achilles injury that required a post-season reconstruction.

On 21 July 2020, Martin announced his retirement from basketball after 13 seasons in the NBL and 342 games. Upon retiring, the league named its Best Defensive Player trophy in honour of Martin.

On 4 February 2024, the Wildcats retired Martin's number 53 jersey.

In July 2026, Martin was inducted into the Basketball WA Hall of Fame.

== National team career ==
Martin played for the Australian Boomers at the 2009 FIBA Oceania Championship, 2010 FIBA World Championship, 2011 London Invitational Tournament, 2011 FIBA Oceania Championship, 2016 Rio Olympics, and 2019 FIBA World Cup qualifiers.

== Career statistics ==
Season	Team	Games	Minutes per game	FG%	FT%	Rebounds	Assists	Blocks	Steals	Turnovers	Fouls	Points per game	Total points
2019-2020	Perth Wildcats	27	20.1	28	80	3.2	2.9	0.1	1.3	1.0	1.9	3.4	391
2018-2019	Perth Wildcats	28	25.2	37	67	3.4	3.9	0.1	1.6	0.9	2.1	5.4	561
2017-2018	Perth Wildcats	28	26.0	34	50	3.9	3.3	0.1	1.5	0.9	2.0	4.6	506
2016-2017	Perth Wildcats	22	28.6	39	42	4.8	3.3	0.2	1.7	1.3	2.6	4.8	431
2015-2016	Perth Wildcats	24	25.9	43	40	4.4	3.3	0.3	1.8	1.8	2.1	5.5	458
2014-2015	Perth Wildcats	30	32.4	37	67	5.8	4.1	0.2	2.7	1.8	2.4	6.2	756
2013-2014	Perth Wildcats	33	31.9	44	61	4.7	4.1	0.5	2.2	1.6	2.4	7.6	844
2012-2013	Perth Wildcats	29	27.1	38	67	4.9	3.2	0.6	1.9	1.4	1.9	6.5	644
2011-2012	Perth Wildcats	26	29.2	38	67	5.6	3.5	0.8	2.0	1.5	2.5	7.4	664
2010-2011	Perth Wildcats	31	26.7	40	68	5.5	3.2	0.5	2.4	1.7	2.6	8.8	825
2009-2010	Perth Wildcats	32	24.4	47	63	4.6	2.9	0.3	1.6	1.5	1.8	8.3	692
2008-2009	West Sydney Razorbacks	22	30.1	28	72	5.4	3.1	0.4	1.9	2.0	1.9	5.0	424
2007-2008	West Sydney Razorbacks	10	30.2	38	67	6.0	1.8	0.1	1.7	0.9	2.7	6.4	201

== Personal life ==
Martin is the son of Anne and Raymond Martin, and has three brothers, Daniel, John and Anthony, and one sister, Beth.

Martin and his wife, Brittany, have three daughters.

In October 2024, Martin was appointed by the Fremantle Football Club to oversee their AFL Leadership program.
