= South East Melbourne Phoenix =

Australian professional basketball team

S.E. Melbourne Phoenix
- 2026–27 S.E. Melbourne Phoenix season
- League: NBL
- Founded: 2018; 8 years ago
- History: South East Melbourne Phoenix; 2019–present
- Arena: John Cain Arena; State Basketball Centre; Gippsland Regional Indoor Sports Stadium
- Capacity: 10,500 (JC); 3,200 (SBC)
- Location: Wantirna South, Victoria
- Team colours: Black, Green, Grey
- CEO: Simon Derrick
- General manager: Simon Mitchell
- Head coach: Josh King
- Team captain: Jordan Hunter; Nathan Sobey
- Ownership: Romie Chaudhari
- Website: SEMPhoenix.com.au
Home	Away

The South East Melbourne Phoenix are an Australian professional basketball team based in the south–eastern Melbourne suburb of Wantirna South, Victoria. The Phoenix entered the National Basketball League (NBL) in the 2019–20 season. The team play the majority of their home games at John Cain Arena, which they share with fellow NBL team Melbourne United, with some games being played at the State Basketball Centre.

== Franchise history ==
With plans to expand the National Basketball League (NBL) beginning with the 2019–20 season, the league sold a franchise licence to Swansea City co-owner Romie Chaudhari in July 2018. It was later announced that the league's ninth franchise would be based in south-eastern Melbourne. On 17 November 2018, the team's name was announced as South East Melbourne Phoenix. The team logo and colours were also revealed. Former NBL player Tommy Greer was the inaugural general manager, Simon Mitchell was the inaugural head coach, and forward Mitch Creek was the first marquee player signing.

The Phoenix debuted in the 2019–20 NBL season, with their first game being on 3 October 2019 against cross-town rivals Melbourne United at Melbourne Arena. The Phoenix won 91–88. They started the season with a 3–0 record before reaching 6–6 after twelve games and then winning three of their final 16 games. They finished the season in eighth position with a 9–19 record. The Phoenix averaged the highest crowd figures ever for a first-year start-up club in Australian Basketball, with a total of 75,179 fans attending their fourteen home games at an average of 5,369 fans per game. Creek and American guard John Roberson were the standout players.

In the 2020–21 NBL season, the Phoenix qualified for their maiden finals berth after finishing in fourth position with a 19–17 record. The team won six out of seven games between rounds 9 and 12. In the semi-finals, the Phoenix lost 2–1 to Melbourne United. Alongside Creek, forward Yannick Wetzell and import Keifer Sykes were key players for the team.

In the 2024–25 NBL season, the Phoenix started by going winless over their first five games, which led to the club parting ways with head coach Mike Kelly. After going 2–1 under interim coach Sam Mackinnon, new coach Josh King took over from round seven. The Phoenix went on finish in fourth position and earn a finals spot, becoming the first team to make the finals after starting 0–5 in the 40-minute era and the second in league history. They ultimately lost 2–1 in the semi-finals series to the Illawarra Hawks.

== Home arena ==
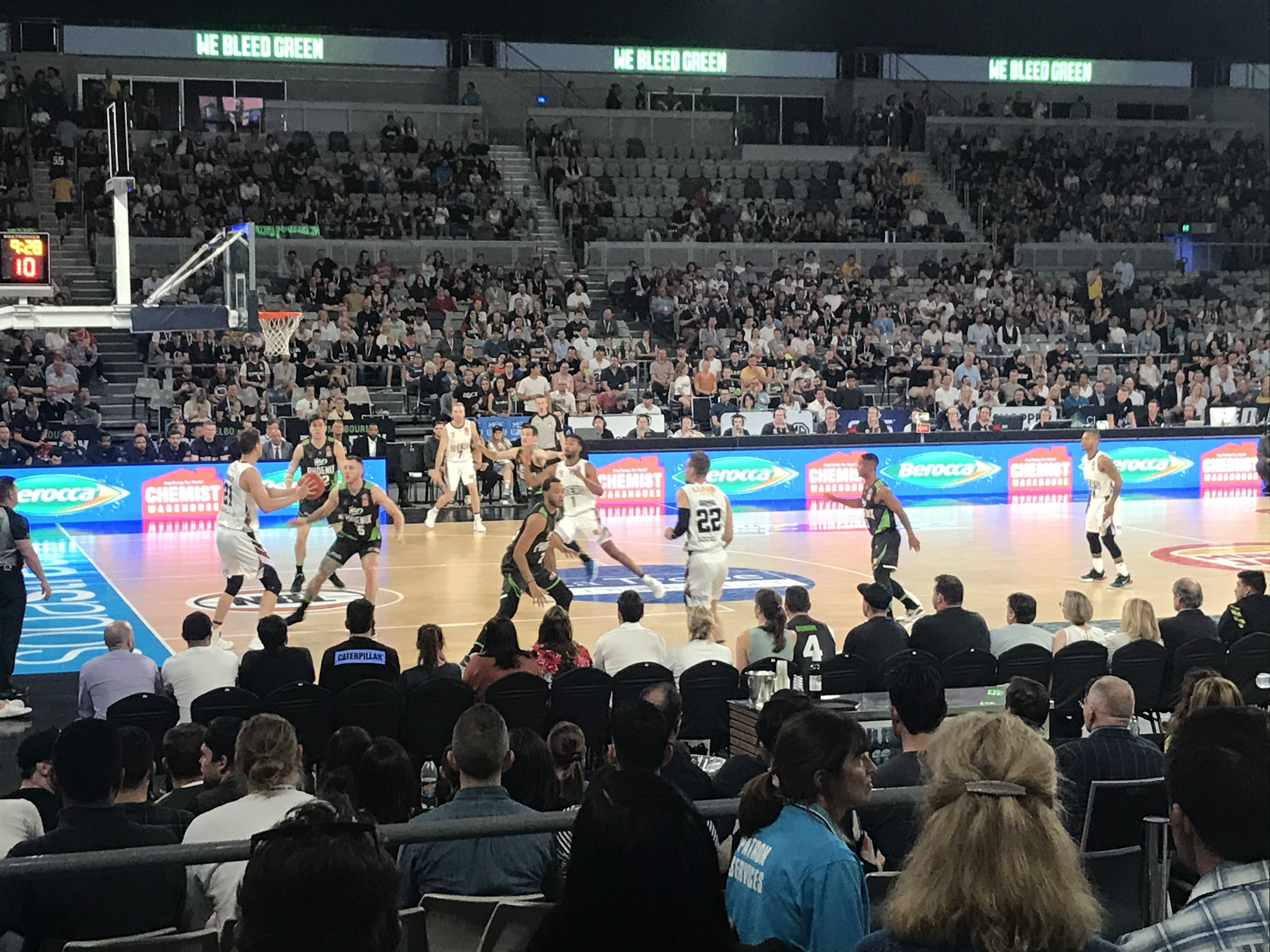
Home game of the Phoenix during their 2019–20 debut season at Melbourne Arena

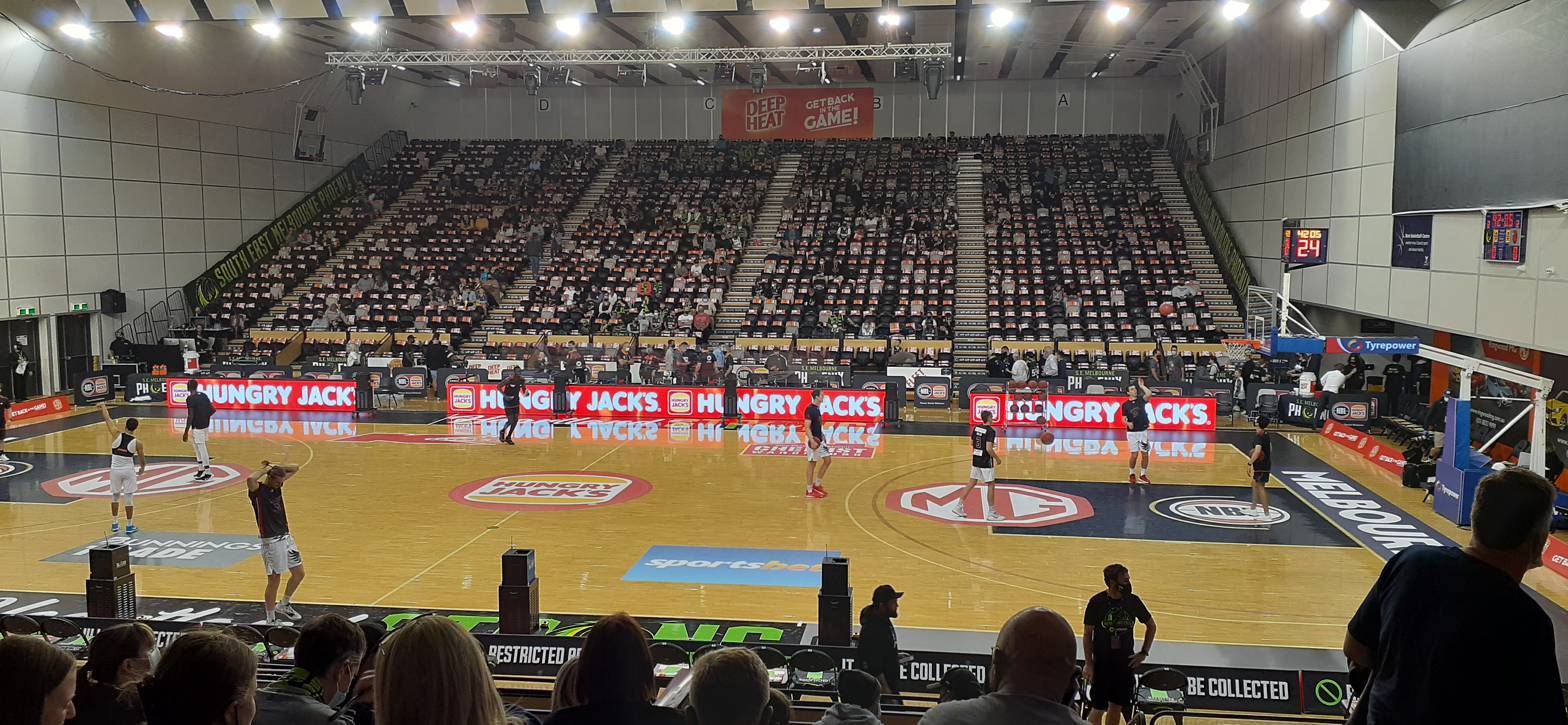
The State Basketball Centre before Phoenix vs Illawarra – 7 February 2021

The Phoenix are headquartered and train at the State Basketball Centre, located in Wantirna South, part of the South-Eastern City of Knox region that forms part of the club's strategic engagement area. The Phoenix play most of their home games at John Cain Arena, which is known as "The Fire Pit" during Phoenix Games. The Phoenix also play a select number of regular season games at the State Basketball Centre each season. During the 2020–21 NBL season, COVID-19 border closures meant that the Phoenix had to relocate their last two home games against the Cairns Taipans and Brisbane Bullets to Cairns Pop-Up Arena. They also hosted their semi-final home game at Qudos Bank Arena in Sydney.

On 25 January 2022, the Phoenix played a regular season game against the Cairns Taipans at the Gippsland Regional Indoor Sports Stadium (GRISS) in Traralgon. The Phoenix have played at least one game at the GRISS every season since, in a partnership with the Latrobe City Council and the Victoria State Government.

- John Cain Arena (2019–present)
- State Basketball Centre (2020–present)
- Cairns Pop-Up Arena (2021)
- Qudos Bank Arena (2021)
- Gippsland Regional Indoor Sports Stadium (2022–present)

== Current roster ==
Note: Flags indicate national team eligibility at FIBA-sanctioned events. Players may hold other non-FIBA nationalities not displayed.

S.E. Melbourne Phoenix roster
Players
Coaches

Pos.	No.	Nat.	Name	Ht.	Wt.
C	1	(Australia)	Hunter, Jordan (C)	2.13 m (7 ft 0 in)	109 kg (240 lb)
G	2	(Australia)	Ryan, Pat (DP)	1.98 m (6 ft 6 in)
G	3	(Australia)	Davidson, Sam	1.90 m (6 ft 3 in)	84 kg (185 lb)
G	4	(Australia)	Daniels, Dash (NS)	1.96 m (6 ft 5 in)	90 kg (198 lb)
G	5	(Australia)	Glover, Angus	1.94 m (6 ft 4 in)	90 kg (198 lb)
F	7	(Australia)	Aliir, Akech	2.04 m (6 ft 8 in)	102 kg (225 lb)
F	8	(Australia)	Biggar, Ellis (DP)	2.08 m (6 ft 10 in)
F	10	(Australia)	Goodrick, Hunter (injured)	2.01 m (6 ft 7 in)	102 kg (225 lb)
G	11	(Australia)	Foster, Daniel	1.97 m (6 ft 6 in)	98 kg (216 lb)
F/C	12	(France)	Morin, Yannis (I)	2.08 m (6 ft 10 in)	95 kg (209 lb)
G	13	(Australia)	Krebs, Tanner	1.98 m (6 ft 6 in)	95 kg (209 lb)
G	15	(Australia)	Box, Kingsley	1.96 m (6 ft 5 in)	82 kg (181 lb)
G	20	(Australia)	Sobey, Nathan (C)	1.90 m (6 ft 3 in)	82 kg (181 lb)
F	99	(United States)	Schwartz, D'Shawn (I)	2.01 m (6 ft 7 in)	105 kg (231 lb)

Head coach

- (United States) Josh King

Assistant coach(es)

- (Australia) Luke Brennan
- (Australia) Adam Gibson
- (United States) Dan Ryan

Legend

- (C) Team captain
- (DP) Development player
- (IN) Inactive
- (I) Import player
- (SRP) Special restricted player
- (NS) Next Star player
- Injured

- Roster
Updated: 14 November 2026

=== Notable players ===
Note: Flags indicate national team eligibility at FIBA-sanctioned events. Players may hold other non-FIBA nationalities not displayed.

Criteria

To appear in this section a player must have either:

- Set a club record or won an individual award while at the club
- Played at least one official international match for their national team at any time
- Played at least one official NBA match at any time.

- (South Sudan) / (Australia) Deng Acuoth
- (United States) Keith Benson
- (Australia) Ryan Broekhoff
- (Australia) Mitch Creek
- (Australia) Adam Gibson
- (Australia) Cameron Gliddon
- (Australia) Angus Glover
- (United States) Matthew Hurt
- (United States) / (Syria) Trey Kell
- (New Zealand) Izayah Le'afa
- (South Sudan) / (Australia) Junior Madut
- (United States) Ben Moore
- (United States) Xavier Munford
- (Egypt) Abdel Nader
- (New Zealand) Tohi Smith-Milner
- (Australia) Nathan Sobey
- (United States) Keifer Sykes
- (New Zealand) Reuben Te Rangi
- (New Zealand) Tom Vodanovich
- (United States) Derrick Walton
- (Guam) Tai Wesley
- (United States) Joe Wieskamp
- (United States) Alan Williams
- (China) Zhou Qi

== Honour roll ==
NBL Championships:	0
Regular Season Champions:	0
NBL Finals Appearances:	4 (2021, 2023, 2025, 2026)
NBL Grand Final appearances:	0
All-NBL First Team:	Mitch Creek (2023), Matthew Hurt (2025), John Brown III (2026), Nathan Sobey (2026)
All-NBL Second Team:	Mitch Creek (2021, 2022, 2024)
NBL Rookie of the Year:	N/A
NBL Most Improved Player:	N/A
NBL Coach of the Year:	N/A
NBL Best Sixth Man:	Angus Glover (2026)
NBL Best Defensive Player:	John Brown III (2026)
GameTime by Kmart:	Dane Pineau (2020), Kyle Adnam (2021), Reuben Te Rangi (2023)

== Season by season ==
NBL champions	League champions	Runners-up	Finals berth

Season	Tier	League	Regular season					Post-season	Head coach	Captain	Club MVP
Season	Tier	League	Finish	Played	Wins	Losses	Win %	Post-season	Head coach	Captain	Club MVP
S.E. Melbourne Phoenix
2019–20	1	NBL	8th	28	9	19	.321	Did not qualify	Simon Mitchell	Mitch Creek; Adam Gibson	Mitch Creek
2020–21	1	NBL	4th	36	19	17	.528	Lost semifinals (Melbourne) 1–2	Simon Mitchell	Kyle Adnam; Adam Gibson	Mitch Creek
2021–22	1	NBL	6th	28	15	13	.536	Did not qualify	Simon Mitchell	Kyle Adnam	Mitch Creek
2022–23	1	NBL	5th	28	15	13	.536	Lost play-in qualifier (Perth) 99–106	Simon Mitchell	Kyle Adnam; Ryan Broekhoff; Mitch Creek	Mitch Creek
2023–24	1	NBL	10th	28	10	18	.357	Did not qualify	Mike Kelly	Mitch Creek	Mitch Creek
2024–25	1	NBL	4th	29	16	13	.552	Lost seeding qualifier (Perth) 105–122; Won play-in game (Adelaide) 85–75; Lost semifinals (Illawarra) 1–2	Mike Kelly; Sam Mackinnon; Josh King	Jordan Hunter; Nathan Sobey	Matthew Hurt
2025–26	1	NBL	3rd	33	22	11	.667	Won seeding qualifier (Perth) 111–94; Lost semifinals (Adelaide) 1–2	Josh King	Jordan Hunter; Nathan Sobey	Nathan Sobey
Regular season record				210	106	104	.505	0 regular season champions			
Finals record				13	5	8	.385	0 NBL championships			

As of the end of the 2025–26 season

== See also ==
- Phoenix (sports team), a list of sports teams named after the mythological phoenix or Phoenix, Arizona
