= 1996 NBL season =

- League: National Basketball League
- Sport: Basketball
- Duration: 12 April – 28 September 1996; 3 – 20 October 1996 (Finals); 25 October – 3 November 1996 (Grand Finals)
- Teams: 14
- TV partner(s): Network Ten; Fox Sports

Regular season
- Season champions: Melbourne Tigers
- Season MVP: Andrew Gaze (Melbourne)
- Top scorer: Andrew Gaze (Melbourne)

Finals
- Champions: South East Melbourne Magic (2nd title)
- Runners-up: Melbourne Tigers
- Finals MVP: Mike Kelly (South East Melbourne)

NBL seasons
- ← 1995 1997 →

The 1996 NBL season was the 18th season of competition since its establishment in 1979. A total of 14 teams contest the league.

== Regular season ==
The 1996 regular season took place over 24 rounds between 12 April 1996 and 28 September 1996.

=== Round 1 ===
Date	Home	Score	Away	Venue	Crowd	Boxscore
12/04/1996	Sydney Kings	102–97	North Melbourne Giants	Sydney Entertainment Centre	N/A	boxscore
13/04/1996	Perth Wildcats	103–89	Townsville Suns	Perth Entertainment Centre	N/A	boxscore
13/04/1996	Gold Coast Rollers	98–120	South East Melbourne Magic	Carrara Indoor Stadium	N/A	boxscore
13/04/1996	Hobart Devils	89–102	Canberra Cannons	Derwent Entertainment Centre	N/A	boxscore
13/04/1996	Geelong Supercats	81–89	Newcastle Falcons	Geelong Arena	N/A	boxscore
13/04/1996	Illawarra Hawks	99–106	Brisbane Bullets	Beaton Park Stadium	N/A	boxscore
14/04/1996	Adelaide 36ers	117–77	Townsville Suns	Adelaide Arena	N/A	boxscore
16/04/1996	Melbourne Tigers	85–105	North Melbourne Giants	Melbourne Park	N/A	boxscore

=== Round 2 ===
Date	Home	Score	Away	Venue	Crowd	Boxscore
19/04/1996	South East Melbourne Magic	115–85	Canberra Cannons	Melbourne Park	N/A	boxscore
19/04/1996	Townsville Suns	123–94	Hobart Devils	Townsville Entertainment Centre	N/A	boxscore
19/04/1996	Adelaide 36ers	110–78	Newcastle Falcons	Adelaide Arena	N/A	boxscore
20/04/1996	Geelong Supercats	90–92	Illawarra Hawks	Geelong Arena	N/A	boxscore
20/04/1996	North Melbourne Giants	104–73	Canberra Cannons	Melbourne Sports and Entertainment Centre	N/A	boxscore
20/04/1996	Perth Wildcats	93–113	Newcastle Falcons	Perth Entertainment Centre	N/A	boxscore
20/04/1996	Sydney Kings	95–93	Hobart Devils	Sydney Entertainment Centre	N/A	boxscore
20/04/1996	Brisbane Bullets	94–88	South East Melbourne Magic	Brisbane Entertainment Centre	N/A	boxscore
21/04/1996	Melbourne Tigers	121–105	Illawarra Hawks	Melbourne Park	N/A	boxscore

=== Round 3 ===
Date	Home	Score	Away	Venue	Crowd	Boxscore
25/04/1996	North Melbourne Giants	111–95	Sydney Kings	Melbourne Sports and Entertainment Centre	N/A	boxscore
26/04/1996	Newcastle Falcons	69–83	Brisbane Bullets	Newcastle Entertainment Centre	N/A	boxscore
26/04/1996	South East Melbourne Magic	99–82	Adelaide 36ers	Melbourne Park	N/A	boxscore
26/04/1996	Townsville Suns	99–102	Gold Coast Rollers	Townsville Entertainment Centre	N/A	boxscore
27/04/1996	Hobart Devils	93–106	Adelaide 36ers	Derwent Entertainment Centre	N/A	boxscore
27/04/1996	Melbourne Tigers	127–132	Perth Wildcats	Melbourne Park	N/A	boxscore
27/04/1996	Canberra Cannons	97–89	Sydney Kings	AIS Arena	N/A	boxscore
28/04/1996	Geelong Supercats	101–107	Perth Wildcats	Geelong Arena	N/A	boxscore

=== Round 4 ===
Date	Home	Score	Away	Venue	Crowd	Boxscore
3/05/1996	South East Melbourne Magic	102–81	Gold Coast Rollers	Melbourne Park	N/A	boxscore
3/05/1996	North Melbourne Giants	102–95	Brisbane Bullets	Melbourne Sports and Entertainment Centre	N/A	boxscore
3/05/1996	Geelong Supercats	100–89	Hobart Devils	Geelong Arena	N/A	boxscore
4/05/1996	Melbourne Tigers	122–95	Townsville Suns	Melbourne Park	N/A	boxscore
4/05/1996	Illawarra Hawks	116–107	Newcastle Falcons	Beaton Park Stadium	N/A	boxscore
4/05/1996	Canberra Cannons	98–87	Brisbane Bullets	AIS Arena	N/A	boxscore
4/05/1996	Adelaide 36ers	87–91	Perth Wildcats	Adelaide Arena	N/A	boxscore

=== Round 5 ===
Date	Home	Score	Away	Venue	Crowd	Boxscore
10/05/1996	Hobart Devils	75–88	Brisbane Bullets	Derwent Entertainment Centre	N/A	boxscore
10/05/1996	Townsville Suns	79–110	Melbourne Tigers	Townsville Entertainment Centre	N/A	boxscore
10/05/1996	Newcastle Falcons	110–109	Sydney Kings	Newcastle Entertainment Centre	N/A	boxscore
10/05/1996	North Melbourne Giants	133–103	Geelong Supercats	Melbourne Sports and Entertainment Centre	N/A	boxscore
11/05/1996	Gold Coast Rollers	99–107	Melbourne Tigers	Carrara Indoor Stadium	N/A	boxscore
11/05/1996	Adelaide 36ers	108–76	Illawarra Hawks	Adelaide Arena	N/A	boxscore
11/05/1996	Sydney Kings	108–101	South East Melbourne Magic	Sydney Entertainment Centre	N/A	boxscore
11/05/1996	Perth Wildcats	83–66	Canberra Cannons	Perth Entertainment Centre	N/A	boxscore

=== Round 6 ===
Date	Home	Score	Away	Venue	Crowd	Boxscore
17/05/1996	Newcastle Falcons	93–95	Hobart Devils	Newcastle Entertainment Centre	N/A	boxscore
17/05/1996	Canberra Cannons	118–86	Adelaide 36ers	AIS Arena	N/A	boxscore
17/05/1996	Gold Coast Rollers	106–125	North Melbourne Giants	Carrara Indoor Stadium	N/A	boxscore
17/05/1996	Sydney Kings	137–119	Melbourne Tigers	Sydney Entertainment Centre	N/A	boxscore
18/05/1996	Geelong Supercats	96–129	Melbourne Tigers	Geelong Arena	N/A	boxscore
18/05/1996	Townsville Suns	97–95	North Melbourne Giants	Townsville Entertainment Centre	N/A	boxscore
18/05/1996	Perth Wildcats	69–106	South East Melbourne Magic	Perth Entertainment Centre	N/A	boxscore
18/05/1996	Brisbane Bullets	89–90	Adelaide 36ers	Brisbane Entertainment Centre	N/A	boxscore
18/05/1996	Illawarra Hawks	80–83	Hobart Devils	Beaton Park Stadium	N/A	boxscore

=== Round 7 ===
Date	Home	Score	Away	Venue	Crowd	Boxscore
24/05/1996	Hobart Devils	85–95	Newcastle Falcons	Derwent Entertainment Centre	N/A	boxscore
24/05/1996	Illawarra Hawks	109–112	Perth Wildcats	Beaton Park Stadium	N/A	boxscore
24/05/1996	North Melbourne Giants	90–89	Adelaide 36ers	Melbourne Sports and Entertainment Centre	N/A	boxscore
24/05/1996	Canberra Cannons	122–84	Geelong Supercats	AIS Arena	N/A	boxscore
25/05/1996	Brisbane Bullets	89–104	Townsville Suns	Brisbane Entertainment Centre	N/A	boxscore
25/05/1996	Geelong Supercats	93–103	South East Melbourne Magic	Geelong Arena	N/A	boxscore
25/05/1996	Sydney Kings	131–112	Gold Coast Rollers	Sydney Entertainment Centre	N/A	boxscore

=== Round 8 ===
Date	Home	Score	Away	Venue	Crowd	Boxscore
31/05/1996	Melbourne Tigers	111–97	Canberra Cannons	Melbourne Park	N/A	boxscore
31/05/1996	Illawarra Hawks	101–112	North Melbourne Giants	Beaton Park Stadium	N/A	boxscore
31/05/1996	Townsville Suns	109–117	Sydney Kings	Townsville Entertainment Centre	N/A	boxscore
31/05/1996	Perth Wildcats	87–76	Adelaide 36ers	Perth Entertainment Centre	N/A	boxscore
31/05/1996	Hobart Devils	116–99	Geelong Supercats	Derwent Entertainment Centre	N/A	boxscore
1/06/1996	South East Melbourne Magic	91–72	Brisbane Bullets	Melbourne Park	N/A	boxscore
1/06/1996	Newcastle Falcons	113–85	North Melbourne Giants	Newcastle Entertainment Centre	N/A	boxscore
1/06/1996	Gold Coast Rollers	108–122	Sydney Kings	Carrara Indoor Stadium	N/A	boxscore

=== Round 9 ===
Date	Home	Score	Away	Venue	Crowd	Boxscore
7/06/1996	South East Melbourne Magic	113–87	Geelong Supercats	Melbourne Park	N/A	boxscore
7/06/1996	Newcastle Falcons	91–100	Townsville Suns	Newcastle Entertainment Centre	N/A	boxscore
7/06/1996	North Melbourne Giants	114–98	Gold Coast Rollers	Melbourne Sports and Entertainment Centre	N/A	boxscore
7/06/1996	Adelaide 36ers	106–96	Canberra Cannons	Adelaide Arena	N/A	boxscore
7/06/1996	Brisbane Bullets	85–92	Perth Wildcats	Brisbane Entertainment Centre	N/A	boxscore
8/06/1996	Melbourne Tigers	98–85	South East Melbourne Magic	Melbourne Park	N/A	boxscore
8/06/1996	Illawarra Hawks	127–90	Townsville Suns	Beaton Park Stadium	N/A	boxscore
8/06/1996	Canberra Cannons	91–94	Gold Coast Rollers	AIS Arena	N/A	boxscore
8/06/1996	Sydney Kings	122–121	Perth Wildcats	Sydney Entertainment Centre	N/A	boxscore

=== Round 10 ===
Date	Home	Score	Away	Venue	Crowd	Boxscore
13/06/1996	North Melbourne Giants	95–92	Townsville Suns	Melbourne Sports and Entertainment Centre	N/A	boxscore
14/06/1996	South East Melbourne Magic	110–80	Newcastle Falcons	Melbourne Park	N/A	boxscore
14/06/1996	Brisbane Bullets	112–76	Geelong Supercats	Brisbane Entertainment Centre	N/A	boxscore
14/06/1996	Gold Coast Rollers	89–105	Hobart Devils	Carrara Indoor Stadium	N/A	boxscore
15/06/1996	Townsville Suns	94–99	Perth Wildcats	Townsville Entertainment Centre	N/A	boxscore
15/06/1996	Illawarra Hawks	104–105	Melbourne Tigers	Beaton Park Stadium	N/A	boxscore
15/06/1996	Canberra Cannons	99–79	North Melbourne Giants	AIS Arena	N/A	boxscore
15/06/1996	Adelaide 36ers	86–79	South East Melbourne Magic	Adelaide Arena	N/A	boxscore
15/06/1996	Sydney Kings	114–110	Newcastle Falcons	Sydney Entertainment Centre	N/A	boxscore
16/06/1996	Melbourne Tigers	100–85	Hobart Devils	Melbourne Park	N/A	boxscore

=== Round 11 ===
Date	Home	Score	Away	Venue	Crowd	Boxscore
21/06/1996	Adelaide 36ers	108–92	Gold Coast Rollers	Adelaide Arena	N/A	boxscore
21/06/1996	Newcastle Falcons	78–89	Illawarra Hawks	Newcastle Entertainment Centre	N/A	boxscore
22/06/1996	Hobart Devils	89–92	Townsville Suns	Derwent Entertainment Centre	N/A	boxscore
22/06/1996	South East Melbourne Magic	98–103	Melbourne Tigers	Melbourne Park	15,366	boxscore
22/06/1996	Geelong Supercats	114–113	North Melbourne Giants	Geelong Arena	N/A	boxscore
22/06/1996	Perth Wildcats	102–79	Gold Coast Rollers	Perth Entertainment Centre	N/A	boxscore
22/06/1996	Sydney Kings	128–106	Illawarra Hawks	Sydney Entertainment Centre	N/A	boxscore
22/06/1996	Brisbane Bullets	102–83	Canberra Cannons	Brisbane Entertainment Centre	N/A	boxscore

=== Round 12 ===
Date	Home	Score	Away	Venue	Crowd	Boxscore
28/06/1996	South East Melbourne Magic	95–79	Illawarra Hawks	Melbourne Park	N/A	boxscore
28/06/1996	Gold Coast Rollers	76–86	Perth Wildcats	Carrara Indoor Stadium	N/A	boxscore
28/06/1996	Geelong Supercats	101–96	Adelaide 36ers	Geelong Arena	N/A	boxscore
29/06/1996	Melbourne Tigers	103–113	Adelaide 36ers	Melbourne Park	N/A	boxscore
29/06/1996	Newcastle Falcons	96–91	Perth Wildcats	Newcastle Entertainment Centre	N/A	boxscore
29/06/1996	Canberra Cannons	132–95	Townsville Suns	AIS Arena	N/A	boxscore
29/06/1996	Brisbane Bullets	100–105	Sydney Kings	Brisbane Entertainment Centre	N/A	boxscore
29/06/1996	Hobart Devils	74–72	Illawarra Hawks	Derwent Entertainment Centre	N/A	boxscore

=== Round 13 ===
Date	Home	Score	Away	Venue	Crowd	Boxscore
5/07/1996	Perth Wildcats	100–105	Hobart Devils	Perth Entertainment Centre	N/A	boxscore
5/07/1996	North Melbourne Giants	97–100	Melbourne Tigers	Melbourne Sports and Entertainment Centre	N/A	boxscore
6/07/1996	Illawarra Hawks	145–121	Sydney Kings	Beaton Park Stadium	N/A	boxscore
6/07/1996	Newcastle Falcons	85–83	Geelong Supercats	Newcastle Entertainment Centre	N/A	boxscore
6/07/1996	Gold Coast Rollers	116–100	Brisbane Bullets	Carrara Indoor Stadium	N/A	boxscore
6/07/1996	Townsville Suns	85–104	South East Melbourne Magic	Townsville Entertainment Centre	N/A	boxscore
6/07/1996	Canberra Cannons	85–86	Melbourne Tigers	AIS Arena	N/A	boxscore
7/07/1996	Adelaide 36ers	114–110	Hobart Devils	Adelaide Arena	N/A	boxscore

=== Round 14 ===
Date	Home	Score	Away	Venue	Crowd	Boxscore
20/07/1996	Hobart Devils	98–91	Gold Coast Rollers	Derwent Entertainment Centre	N/A	boxscore
20/07/1996	Brisbane Bullets	92–82	Illawarra Hawks	Brisbane Entertainment Centre	N/A	boxscore

=== Round 15 ===
Date	Home	Score	Away	Venue	Crowd	Boxscore
27/07/1996	Illawarra Hawks	93–113	Geelong Supercats	Beaton Park Stadium	N/A	boxscore
27/07/1996	Gold Coast Rollers	94–95	Newcastle Falcons	Carrara Indoor Stadium	N/A	boxscore

=== Round 16 ===
Date	Home	Score	Away	Venue	Crowd	Boxscore
3/08/1996	Geelong Supercats	109–94	Townsville Suns	Geelong Arena	N/A	boxscore
3/08/1996	Brisbane Bullets	94–88	Hobart Devils	Brisbane Entertainment Centre	N/A	boxscore

=== Round 17 ===
Date	Home	Score	Away	Venue	Crowd	Boxscore
9/08/1996	Gold Coast Rollers	106–102	Adelaide 36ers	Carrara Indoor Stadium	N/A	boxscore
9/08/1996	Sydney Kings	97–121	Canberra Cannons	Sydney Entertainment Centre	N/A	boxscore
9/08/1996	Hobart Devils	77–105	Perth Wildcats	Derwent Entertainment Centre	N/A	boxscore
9/08/1996	Melbourne Tigers	98–93	Newcastle Falcons	Melbourne Park	N/A	boxscore
10/08/1996	Illawarra Hawks	135–113	Gold Coast Rollers	Beaton Park Stadium	N/A	boxscore
10/08/1996	Townsville Suns	99–103	Adelaide 36ers	Townsville Entertainment Centre	N/A	boxscore
10/08/1996	Brisbane Bullets	92–89	North Melbourne Giants	Brisbane Entertainment Centre	N/A	boxscore
10/08/1996	Geelong Supercats	89–96	Canberra Cannons	Geelong Arena	N/A	boxscore
10/08/1996	South East Melbourne Magic	96–91	Perth Wildcats	Melbourne Park	N/A	boxscore

=== Round 18 ===
Date	Home	Score	Away	Venue	Crowd	Boxscore
16/08/1996	Townsville Suns	69–112	Brisbane Bullets	Townsville Entertainment Centre	N/A	boxscore
16/08/1996	Hobart Devils	82–81	Sydney Kings	Derwent Entertainment Centre	N/A	boxscore
16/08/1996	Perth Wildcats	105–91	Geelong Supercats	Perth Entertainment Centre	N/A	boxscore
16/08/1996	North Melbourne Giants	117–107	Illawarra Hawks	Melbourne Sports and Entertainment Centre	N/A	boxscore
17/08/1996	South East Melbourne Magic	93–99	Sydney Kings	Melbourne Park	N/A	boxscore
17/08/1996	Newcastle Falcons	119–115	Gold Coast Rollers	Newcastle Entertainment Centre	N/A	boxscore
17/08/1996	Canberra Cannons	100–82	Illawarra Hawks	AIS Arena	N/A	boxscore
18/08/1996	Adelaide 36ers	122–112	Geelong Supercats	Adelaide Arena	N/A	boxscore
18/08/1996	Melbourne Tigers	120–89	Gold Coast Rollers	Melbourne Park	N/A	boxscore

=== Round 19 ===
Date	Home	Score	Away	Venue	Crowd	Boxscore
23/08/1996	Illawarra Hawks	87–76	South East Melbourne Magic	Beaton Park Stadium	N/A	boxscore
23/08/1996	Gold Coast Rollers	109–93	Geelong Supercats	Carrara Indoor Stadium	N/A	boxscore
23/08/1996	Perth Wildcats	96–99	Melbourne Tigers	Perth Entertainment Centre	N/A	boxscore
23/08/1996	Canberra Cannons	85–58	Hobart Devils	AIS Arena	N/A	boxscore
24/08/1996	Newcastle Falcons	109–112	South East Melbourne Magic	Newcastle Entertainment Centre	N/A	boxscore
24/08/1996	Townsville Suns	119–116	Geelong Supercats	Townsville Entertainment Centre	N/A	boxscore
24/08/1996	Adelaide 36ers	112–123	Melbourne Tigers	Adelaide Arena	N/A	boxscore
24/08/1996	Sydney Kings	99–102	Brisbane Bullets	Sydney Entertainment Centre	N/A	boxscore
24/08/1996	North Melbourne Giants	100–97	Hobart Devils	Melbourne Sports and Entertainment Centre	N/A	boxscore

=== Round 20 ===
Date	Home	Score	Away	Venue	Crowd	Boxscore
30/08/1996	Hobart Devils	106–112	North Melbourne Giants	Derwent Entertainment Centre	N/A	boxscore
30/08/1996	Melbourne Tigers	105–101	Brisbane Bullets	Melbourne Park	N/A	boxscore
30/08/1996	Illawarra Hawks	111–121	Canberra Cannons	Beaton Park Stadium	N/A	boxscore
30/08/1996	Adelaide 36ers	93–88	Sydney Kings	Adelaide Arena	N/A	boxscore
31/08/1996	South East Melbourne Magic	102–91	North Melbourne Giants	Melbourne Park	N/A	boxscore
31/08/1996	Geelong Supercats	71–119	Brisbane Bullets	Geelong Arena	N/A	boxscore
31/08/1996	Newcastle Falcons	100–110	Canberra Cannons	Newcastle Entertainment Centre	N/A	boxscore
31/08/1996	Gold Coast Rollers	123–113	Townsville Suns	Carrara Indoor Stadium	N/A	boxscore
31/08/1996	Perth Wildcats	101–87	Sydney Kings	Perth Entertainment Centre	N/A	boxscore

=== Round 21 ===
Date	Home	Score	Away	Venue	Crowd	Boxscore
6/09/1996	South East Melbourne Magic	117–95	Townsville Suns	Melbourne Park	N/A	boxscore
6/09/1996	Illawarra Hawks	120–101	Adelaide 36ers	Beaton Park Stadium	N/A	boxscore
6/09/1996	Canberra Cannons	101–94	Perth Wildcats	AIS Arena	N/A	boxscore
7/09/1996	Melbourne Tigers	114–96	Geelong Supercats	Melbourne Park	N/A	boxscore
7/09/1996	Newcastle Falcons	95–99	Adelaide 36ers	Newcastle Entertainment Centre	N/A	boxscore
7/09/1996	North Melbourne Giants	100–97	Perth Wildcats	Melbourne Sports and Entertainment Centre	N/A	boxscore
7/09/1996	Sydney Kings	109–98	Townsville Suns	Sydney Entertainment Centre	N/A	boxscore
7/09/1996	Brisbane Bullets	112–81	Gold Coast Rollers	Brisbane Entertainment Centre	N/A	boxscore

=== Round 22 ===
Date	Home	Score	Away	Venue	Crowd	Boxscore
13/09/1996	Geelong Supercats	113–120	Sydney Kings	Geelong Arena	N/A	boxscore
13/09/1996	North Melbourne Giants	107–118	Newcastle Falcons	Melbourne Sports and Entertainment Centre	N/A	boxscore
13/09/1996	Townsville Suns	130–122	Illawarra Hawks	Townsville Entertainment Centre	N/A	boxscore
13/09/1996	Perth Wildcats	98–93	Brisbane Bullets	Perth Entertainment Centre	N/A	boxscore
14/09/1996	Melbourne Tigers	119–115	Sydney Kings	Melbourne Park	N/A	boxscore
14/09/1996	Canberra Cannons	125–94	Newcastle Falcons	AIS Arena	N/A	boxscore
14/09/1996	Gold Coast Rollers	94–110	Illawarra Hawks	Carrara Indoor Stadium	N/A	boxscore
14/09/1996	Adelaide 36ers	105–98	Brisbane Bullets	Adelaide Arena	N/A	boxscore
15/09/1996	South East Melbourne Magic	106–87	Hobart Devils	Melbourne Park	N/A	boxscore

=== Round 23 ===
Date	Home	Score	Away	Venue	Crowd	Boxscore
20/09/1996	Canberra Cannons	95–97	South East Melbourne Magic	AIS Arena	N/A	boxscore
20/09/1996	Perth Wildcats	117–98	Illawarra Hawks	Perth Entertainment Centre	N/A	boxscore
20/09/1996	Townsville Suns	114–100	Newcastle Falcons	Townsville Entertainment Centre	N/A	boxscore
20/09/1996	Hobart Devils	104–118	Melbourne Tigers	Derwent Entertainment Centre	N/A	boxscore
21/09/1996	Geelong Supercats	131–93	Gold Coast Rollers	Geelong Arena	N/A	boxscore
21/09/1996	North Melbourne Giants	105–114	South East Melbourne Magic	Melbourne Sports and Entertainment Centre	N/A	boxscore
21/09/1996	Sydney Kings	140–120	Adelaide 36ers	Sydney Entertainment Centre	N/A	boxscore
21/09/1996	Brisbane Bullets	107–90	Newcastle Falcons	Brisbane Entertainment Centre	N/A	boxscore

=== Round 24 ===
Date	Home	Score	Away	Venue	Crowd	Boxscore
27/09/1996	Hobart Devils	79–101	South East Melbourne Magic	Derwent Entertainment Centre	N/A	boxscore
27/09/1996	Newcastle Falcons	126–108	Melbourne Tigers	Newcastle Entertainment Centre	N/A	boxscore
27/09/1996	Gold Coast Rollers	80–108	Canberra Cannons	Carrara Indoor Stadium	N/A	boxscore
27/09/1996	Adelaide 36ers	92–70	North Melbourne Giants	Adelaide Arena	N/A	boxscore
28/09/1996	Townsville Suns	103–100	Canberra Cannons	Townsville Entertainment Centre	N/A	boxscore
28/09/1996	Perth Wildcats	93–99	North Melbourne Giants	Perth Entertainment Centre	N/A	boxscore
28/09/1996	Sydney Kings	100–94	Geelong Supercats	Sydney Entertainment Centre	N/A	boxscore
28/09/1996	Brisbane Bullets	103–104	Melbourne Tigers	Brisbane Entertainment Centre	N/A	boxscore

== Ladder ==
Pos	1996 NBL season											
Pos	Team	Pld	W	L	PCT	Last 5	Streak	Home	Away	PF	PA	PP
1	Melbourne Tigers	26	21	5	80.77%	4–1	W1	10–3	11–2	2834	2647	107.06%
2	S.E. Melbourne Magic	26	19	7	73.08%	5–0	W7	11–2	8–5	2623	2338	112.19%
3	Perth Wildcats^{1 2}	26	16	10	61.54%	2–3	L1	8–5	8–5	2565	2472	103.76%
4	Canberra Cannons^{1 2}	26	16	10	61.54%	3–2	L1	10–3	6–7	2606	2415	107.91%
5	Sydney Kings^{1 3}	26	16	10	61.54%	4-1	W2	11–2	5–8	2830	2775	101.98%
6	Adelaide 36ers^{1 3}	26	16	10	61.54%	3–2	W1	11–2	5–8	2623	2530	103.68%
7	North Melbourne Giants	26	15	11	57.69%	2–3	W1	10–3	5–8	2647	2580	102.60%
8	Brisbane Bullets	26	14	12	53.85%	2–3	L1	8–5	6–7	2527	2369	106.67%
9	Newcastle Falcons	26	11	15	42.31%	2–3	W1	6–7	5–8	2546	2633	96.70%
10	Illawarra Hawks^{4}	26	9	17	34.62%	2–3	L1	6–7	3–10	2647	2704	97.89%
11	Townsville Suns^{4}	26	9	17	34.62%	3–2	W3	6–7	3–10	2554	2797	91.31%
12	Hobart Devils	26	8	18	30.77%	0–5	L6	4–9	4–9	2356	2541	92.72%
13	Geelong Supercats^{5}	26	6	20	23.08%	1–4	L1	5–8	1–12	2536	2783	91.12%
14	Gold Coast Rollers^{5}	26	6	20	23.08%	1–4	L4	4–9	2–11	2538	2848	89.12%

Updated to match(es) played on 28 September 1996. Source: NBL.com.au

The NBL tie-breaker system as outlined in the NBL Rules and Regulations states that in the case of an identical win–loss record, the results in games played between the teams will determine order of seeding.

^{1}4-way Head-to-Head between Perth Wildcats (4-2), Canberra Cannons (4-2), Sydney Kings (2-4) and Adelaide 36ers (2-4).

^{2}Head-to-Head between Perth Wildcats and Canberra Cannons (1-1). Perth Wildcats won For and Against (+10).

^{3}Head-to-Head between Sydney Kings and Adelaide 36ers (1-1). Sydney Kings won For and Against (+15).

^{4}Head-to-Head between Illawarra Hawks and Townsville Suns (1-1). Illawarra Hawks won For and Against (+29).

^{5}Head-to-Head between Geelong Supercats and Gold Coast Rollers (1-1). Geelong Supercats won For and Against (+22).

== Finals ==
=== Playoff bracket ===
Quarterfinals
1	Melbourne Tigers	97	96	111
8	Brisbane Bullets	118	87	93
4	Canberra Cannons	89	146	101
5	Sydney Kings	113	99	89
3	Perth Wildcats	93	115	104
6	Adelaide 36ers	103	92	114
2	S.E. Melbourne Magic	96	87	X
7	North Melbourne Giants	82	77	X

Semifinals
1	Melbourne Tigers	87	100	91
4	Canberra Cannons	98	82	87
2	S.E. Melbourne Magic	87	112	X
6	Adelaide 36ers	86	81	X

Grand Final
1	Melbourne Tigers	100	84	70
2	S.E. Melbourne Magic	89	88	107

=== Quarter-finals ===
Date	Home	Score	Away	Venue	Crowd	Boxscore
3/10/1996	Sydney Kings	113–89	Canberra Cannons	Sydney Entertainment Centre	N/A	boxscore
4/10/1996	North Melbourne Giants	82–96	South East Melbourne Magic	Melbourne Sports and Entertainment Centre	N/A	boxscore
4/10/1996	Adelaide 36ers	103–93	Perth Wildcats	Adelaide Arena	N/A	boxscore
5/10/1996	Brisbane Bullets	118–97	Melbourne Tigers	Brisbane Entertainment Centre	N/A	boxscore
5/10/1996	Canberra Cannons	146–99	Sydney Kings	AIS Arena	N/A	boxscore
6/10/1996	Perth Wildcats	115–92	Adelaide 36ers	Perth Entertainment Centre	N/A	boxscore
6/10/1996	South East Melbourne Magic	87–77	North Melbourne Giants	Melbourne Park	N/A	boxscore
7/10/1996	Melbourne Tigers	96–87	Brisbane Bullets	Melbourne Park	N/A	boxscore
7/10/1996	Canberra Cannons	101–89	Sydney Kings	AIS Arena	N/A	boxscore
8/10/1996	Perth Wildcats	104–114	Adelaide 36ers	Perth Entertainment Centre	N/A	boxscore
9/10/1996	Melbourne Tigers	111–93	Brisbane Bullets	Melbourne Park	N/A	boxscore

=== Semi-finals ===
Date	Home	Score	Away	Venue	Crowd	Boxscore
12/10/1996	Adelaide 36ers	86–87	South East Melbourne Magic	Adelaide Arena	N/A	boxscore
14/10/1996	Canberra Cannons	98–87	Melbourne Tigers	AIS Arena	N/A	boxscore
18/10/1996	Melbourne Tigers	100–82	Canberra Cannons	Melbourne Park	N/A	boxscore
19/10/1996	South East Melbourne Magic	112–81	Adelaide 36ers	Melbourne Park	N/A	boxscore
20/10/1996	Melbourne Tigers	91–87	Canberra Cannons	Melbourne Park	N/A	boxscore

=== Grand Final ===
The 1996 NBL Grand Final between the Magic and the Tigers drew an NBL Grand Final aggregate attendance record of 43,605 (average 14,535). Game 2 of the series at the National Tennis Centre at Flinders Park drew a single game Grand Final attendance record of 15,064. Both records still stand as of the 2016–17 NBL season

Date	Home	Score	Away	Venue	Crowd	Boxscore
25/10/1996	South East Melbourne Magic	89–100	Melbourne Tigers	Melbourne Park	N/A	boxscore
1/11/1996	Melbourne Tigers	84–88	South East Melbourne Magic	Melbourne Park	15,064	boxscore
3/11/1996	Melbourne Tigers	70–107	South East Melbourne Magic	Melbourne Park	N/A	boxscore

== 1996 NBL statistics leaders ==
Category	Player	Team	Stat
Points per game	Andrew Gaze	Melbourne Tigers	31.1
Rebounds per game	Clarence Tyson	Townsville Suns	14.1
Assists per game	Darryl McDonald	North Melbourne Giants	10.0
Steals per game	Ira Bowman	Gold Coast Rollers	4.0
Blocks per game	David Van Dyke	Newcastle Falcons	4.3
Free throw percentage	Andrew Gaze	Melbourne Tigers	90.5%

== NBL awards ==
This is a list of awards given for the season:

- Most Valuable Player: Andrew Gaze
- Most Valuable Player Grand Final: Mike Kelly
- Best Defensive Player: Isaac Burton
- Most Improved Player: Chris Anstey
- Rookie of the Year: Scott McGregor
- Coach of the Year: Brett Flanigan

== All NBL Team ==
#	Player	Team
PG	Darryl McDonald	North Melbourne Giants
SG	Robert Rose	Canberra Cannons
SF	Andrew Gaze	Melbourne Tigers
PF	Ray Owes	Geelong Supercats
C	Mark Bradtke	Melbourne Tigers
