= Butch Hays =

American-Australian basketball player

Personal information
- Born: 16 September 1962 (age 64) Playa del Rey, California, U.S.
- Listed height: 193 cm (6 ft 4 in)
- Listed weight: 89 kg (196 lb)

Career information
- High school: St. Bernard (Los Angeles, California)
- College: California (1980–1984)
- NBA draft: 1984: 7th round, 141st overall pick
- Drafted by: Chicago Bulls
- Playing career: 1984–2012
- Position: Point guard
- Number: 11

Career history
- 1985–1987: Birmingham Bullets
- 1987–1988: Dijon
- 1988–1989: Glasgow Rangers
- 1989–1990: San Jose Jammers
- 1991–1992: Adelaide 36ers
- 1993–1994: Illawarra Hawks
- 1995–1997: Newcastle Falcons
- 1998: North Melbourne Giants
- 1999–2000: Newcastle Falcons
- 2003: Canberra Cannons
- 2005–2015: Maitland Mustangs

Career highlights
- 3× All-NBL Second Team (1991, 1993, 1995); 3× All-NBL Third Team (1992, 1994, 1996); BBL All-Star (1988); Pac-10 Defensive Player of the Year (1984)
- Stats at Basketball Reference

William "Butch" Hays (born 16 September 1962) is an American-Australian former professional basketball player who played most of his career in Australia's National Basketball League (NBL) from 1991 to 2003.

== Early life ==
Born in Playa del Rey, California, Hays grew up in South Central L.A. on West 75th Street in an area known for its street gangs and where he was located was directly between two of the gangs, the Bloods and Crips. As a youth he played athletics, American football and baseball, but was introduced to basketball by a neighbour when he was 12 years old, but it wasn't until he was in high school that he started receiving some coaching.

== School / college career ==
Hays earned All-American honours while at St. Bernard High School and was awarded a scholarship with the University of California, Berkeley. After four years with the Golden Bears under the coaching of Dick Kuchen, Hays graduated as the Golden Bears' all-time leader in assists, though this record has since fallen to former teammate Kevin Johnson and, later, Jason Kidd.

== Professional career ==
=== 1984 NBA draft ===
After graduating from Cal Berkeley, Hays, a 193-centimetre (6 ft 4 in) point guard, nominated for the 1984 NBA draft and was a seventh round pick of the Chicago Bulls who that year also drafted a player from North Carolina named Michael Jordan. As draftees, Hays and Jordan roomed together and actually lived together before Hays was released from his contract.

=== CBA ===
Hays landed in the Continental Basketball Association where in 1988 he signed with new team, the San Jose Jammers.

=== NBL ===
After two years with the Jammers, Hays was then signed for two years as an import player by the Adelaide 36ers in Australia's National Basketball League as the teams replacement for long time point guard Al Green. Hays had an immediate impact with the 36ers in 1991 who in 1990 had missed the NBL playoffs for the first time since 1983. Showing his class and skill, Hays averaged 24.6 points, 4.5 rebounds and 9 assists as he helped the 36ers back to the playoffs where they would ultimately be beaten 2–0 in the Semi-finals by their nemesis, the defending and eventual champion Perth Wildcats. In his first NBL game for the 36ers against the Illawarra Hawks on 12 April at Adelaide's then home court, the 3,000 seat Apollo Stadium, Hays scored 36 points which as of 2020–21 remains the 36ers club record for points scored in a debut game. In that game he also had 8 rebounds, 11 assists and 6 steals making him an instant favourite among the 36ers fans. During his first year with the 36ers, Hays also set the still standing club record for assists in a single game in the second of the Quarter finals against the Melbourne Tigers, dishing out 17 to help Adelaide to a 132–96 win.

1992 saw the 36ers move into the 8,000-seat Clipsal Powerhouse, but also saw Hays' numbers dip slightly to 21.6 points, 4.6 rebounds and 6.6 assists and the 36ers missed the NBL playoffs. At the end of the year, the 36ers signed veteran Australian Boomers point guard and local Adelaide product Phil Smyth. This, combined with the continued development of local guard Brett Maher, saw the then-30-year-old Hays unwanted by the club and he signed with another NBL team, the perennially struggling Illawarra Hawks for two years.

Hays helped the Hawks to the quarter-finals in 1993 and 1994 before signing with his 3rd NBL team, the Newcastle Falcons from 1995. He would spend 3 seasons in Newcastle, helping the Falcons to the playoffs in 1995, but missing the finals in 1996 and 1997.

In 1998, Hays signed to play for the North Melbourne Giants, though his stint with his 4th NBL club only lasted 8 games before leaving the club. Unfortunately, due to the NBL's rules at the time he was unable to sign with another club and was forced to sit out the remainder of the season. He then returned to the Falcons for 1998–99 NBL season before retiring at the end of the year. He then began to play with the Maitland Mustangs in the New South Wales-based Waratah League.

During the 2002–03 NBL season, Hays suited up for four games for the NBL's Canberra Cannons before retiring (for the final time) from the NBL at the age of 41. He then returned to the Mustangs where he would play until calling time on his career at the age of 50 in 2012.

Hays played 232 NBL games, averaging 18.6 points, 4.5 rebounds and 6.0 assists per game.

== Personal life ==
Hays' son Griffin was killed in 2010 in an accident on a Newcastle rail line.

== NBL career stats ==
Legend
GP	Games played	GS	Games started	MPG	Minutes per game
FG%	Field goal percentage	3P%	3-point field goal percentage	FT%	Free throw percentage
RPG	Rebounds per game	APG	Assists per game	SPG	Steals per game
BPG	Blocks per game	PPG	Points per game	**Bold**	Career high

Year	Team	GP	GS	MPG	FG%	3P%	FT%	RPG	APG	SPG	BPG	PPG
1991	Adelaide 36ers	**30**	**30**	42.4	**.542**	**.551**	**.821**	4.5	**9.0**	2.0	0.3	**24.6**
1992	Adelaide 36ers	24	24	41.4	.506	.419	.773	4.6	6.6	2.2	**0.5**	21.6
1993	Illawarra Hawks	28	28	**45.6**	.483	.309	.774	4.5	6.2	**2.3**	0.0	18.3
1994	Illawarra Hawks	28	28	**45.6**	.519	.456	.770	5.3	5.4	2.1	0.2	21.0
1995	Newcastle Falcons	29	29	44.7	.472	.422	.778	**5.6**	7.1	1.5	**0.5**	20.2
1996	Newcastle Falcons	26	26	45.1	.456	.381	.839	5.5	6.0	1.3	0.6	18.7
1997	Newcastle Falcons	**30**	**30**	42.9	.473	.366	.781	4.2	5.1	1.4	0.1	17.8
1998	North Melbourne Giants	8	8	37.1	.466	.286	.688	2.9	3.4	0.9	0.1	8.9
1998–99	Newcastle Falcons	25	25	28.8	.459	.337	.758	2.3	3.3	0.7	0.2	10.8
2002–03	Canberra Cannons	4	0	11.4	.250	.200	.600	1.0	1.8	0.8	0.0	2.0
**Career**		232	228	41.6	.491	.392	.790	4.5	6.0	1.6	0.3	18.6
