= Jason Cameron (basketball) =

Australian basketball player

Personal information
- Born: 20 February 1974 (age 52) Mackay, Queensland
- Listed height: 200 cm (6 ft 7 in)

Career information
- Playing career: 1991–2000
- Position: Small forward
- Number: 11

Career history
- 1991: Brisbane Bullets
- 1993–1999: Townsville Suns/Crocodiles
- 1999–2000: Brisbane Bullets

Career highlights
- As player: ABA champion (2005); ABA Grand Final MVP (2005); 2× SEABL South champion (2005, 2007); SEABL South Grand Final MVP (2007); ABA Finals All-Star Five (2003); QBL champion (2003); As coach: QBL Coach of the Year (2008)

Jason Cameron (born 20 February 1974) is an Australian former professional basketball player who played nine seasons in the National Basketball League (NBL). The 200 cm small forward from Mackay also spent multiple years in the Queensland Basketball League and the South East Australian Basketball League where he won numerous awards during the 2000s.

== Early life ==
Cameron was born in Mackay, Queensland.

== NBL career ==
=== Brisbane Bullets (1991) ===
Cameron first played in the National Basketball League during the 1991 season as a development player for the Brisbane Bullets. He received limited opportunities in his first season, as the Bullets failed to make the playoffs with a win/loss record of 13–13 and a ninth-place finish. In two games for Brisbane, he played a total of 155 seconds and recorded one rebound while missing both field goals he attempted.

=== Townsville Suns (1993–1998) ===
After not being retained by the Bullets for the 1992 season, Cameron moved to Canberra where he attended the Australian Institute of Sport (AIS) and played for the AIS men's team in the South East Australian Basketball League. In 1993, Cameron returned to the NBL as he joined the Townsville Suns for the club's inaugural season. His first full season in the NBL proved to be very effective as he provided the Suns with good minutes off the bench for the first half of the season before earning a starting spot alongside Ricky Jones and David Blades for the majority of the second half of the season. In 22 games, he averaged 5.9 points, 2.9 rebounds, 2.3 assists and 1.1 steals per game as the Suns finished their first season with a dismal 4–22 win/loss record and a last place finish.

Cameron played in a career-low 18 games (not including his development player season) for the Suns in 1994 and subsequently averaged 4.3 points, 3.2 rebounds, 1.6 assists and 1.0 steals per game. In 1995, the Suns showed improvement with a 9–17 win/loss record on the season. Cameron's production increased as he averaged 7.4 points, 4.2 rebounds, 2.4 assists and 1.2 steals in 26 games. He was also selected to the Future Forces game held during the NBL All-Star Weekend in Adelaide. In the following season, Cameron's points numbers dropped to 5.8 per game despite starting in most of the Suns' games.

Cameron's best season in the NBL came in 1997 with career-highs of 12.3 points and 1.6 steals, in addition to 4.5 rebounds and 2.3 assists per game. On 8 August 1997, Cameron hit the 20-point mark for the first time in his career in a win over the Adelaide 36ers. Cameron's best NBL season corresponded with the Suns also having their best season in 1997 as they finished with a 14–16 win/loss record a seventh-place finish, one win off a playoff spot that Brisbane nabbed with 15 wins.

While his points averages did drop in 1998, Cameron still managed to average a career-high 4.7 rebounds and score a career-high 22 points on 27 March in a win over the Canberra Cannons. 1998 marked the end of the Suns brand as the club changed their name to the Crocodiles for the 1998–99 NBL season. With 151 games played out of the Suns' 164, Cameron was the only player to have played in all six Suns seasons.

=== Final years in NBL (1998–2000) ===
Cameron was one of six Suns players to stick with the club for the Crocodiles' inaugural season in 1998–99. But with the name change came a career-low season for Cameron as he averaged just 2.4 points, 1.4 rebounds and 1.2 assists in 26 games.

After parting ways with Townsville following a disappointing 1998–99 season, Cameron moved back to Brisbane and re-joined the Bullets for the 1999–2000 NBL season. In what was Cameron's final season in the NBL, he averaged 5.4 points, 2.6 rebounds and 1.4 assists in 28 games.

== Post-NBL career ==
=== South West Metro Pirates (2003) ===
Between 1999 and 2003, Cameron played in the Queensland Basketball League (QBL) for the Mackay Meteors and the South West Metro Pirates. Playing for the Pirates in 2003, Cameron guided them to a maiden QBL championship and a trip to the ABA National Finals. There, the Pirates faced off against the Canberra Gunners on 29 August for a spot in the semi-finals. Unfortunately, with a 102–83 loss, they were knocked out of the championship race, and the following day, they faced fellow eliminated quarter-finalist Forestville Eagles, also losing this encounter 118–102. Despite their two losses, Cameron was named to the ABA Finals All-Star Five alongside NBL players Daniel Egan and Chris Stauber.

=== Bendigo Braves (2004–2007) ===
In 2004, Cameron moved south to join the Bendigo Braves of the South East Australian Basketball League (SEABL). In just his second season with the Braves, he returned to the ABA National Finals playing alongside future Perth Wildcats legend Shawn Redhage. The Braves won all but five regular season games in 2005 and were successful in claiming the SEABL South championship with a 105–99 grand final win over the Kilsyth Cobras. The Braves went on to cap off a spectacular season with a 102–98 ABA Grand Final win over the Sydney City Comets, as Cameron earned Grand Final MVP honours. Two seasons later, the Braves repeated as SEABL South champions and booked themselves a place in the 2007 Australian Club Championships (ACC) with another South Grand Final defeat of the Kilsyth Cobras. In the 74–63 win, Cameron earned Grand Final MVP honours. Despite having the confidence of their 2005 win behind them, the Braves were convincingly beaten 100–70 by Big V champions the Dandenong Rangers in their quarter-final match-up. In what was Cameron's final game for the Braves, he scored 12 points in the disappointing loss. In 98 games for the Braves over four seasons (being co-captain for the last three alongside Ben Harvey), Cameron averaged 14.9 points, 5.0 rebounds and 3.1 assists per game.

=== Return to South West Metro (2008–2010) ===
In 2008, Cameron returned to Queensland where he re-joined the South West Metro Pirates as a player/coach. He made an immediate impact over the first three games, averaging 18 points and 8 rebounds while earning Player of the Week honours for Round 3. The Pirates held top position on the ladder for a long stretch of the 2008 season, and with an 8–0 record by mid-June, Cameron earned the Coach of the Month honours for the season's second month. They were competition front-runners from Rounds 7 through 11 and showed they were up to any challenge thrown at them. On 30 June, the Pirates played the UNLV Runnin' Rebels college basketball team in their fifth of six exhibition games on their tour of Australia. Hosting the Rebels at the Queensland Academy of Sport's Athletics Centre, the Pirates were easily defeated 97–55 despite a notable 14-point effort from Cameron. Cameron and teammate Brendan Teys were superb throughout the QBL season and helped the Pirates win their quarter-final match-up against the Logan Thunder. The Pirates unfortunately lost to the Townsville Heat in the semi-final despite having won the earlier season match-up with the Heat in Round 2. Cameron was subsequently named the QBL Coach of the Year.

Returning to the Pirates in 2009 as captain/coach, Cameron guided the club to a third straight semi-final, but again could not get them over the hump as they were beaten by the eventual champions Cairns Marlins in a 37-point thrashing. In what was his final game as coach of the Pirates, Cameron recorded 13 points and 10 rebounds in the 115–78 loss. In January 2010, Cameron was replaced as coach of the Pirates by former NBL player and Australian Boomer Stephen Black. Cameron did return as just a player for the Pirates in 2010, alongside fellow returnees Nate Niesler and Troy Thomson, and continued to captain the team. However, he managed just 13 games for the Pirates in 2010 due to injury and subsequently retired from basketball at the end of the season.

== NBL career statistics ==
Legend
GP	Games played	GS	Games started	MPG	Minutes per game
FG%	Field goal percentage	3P%	3-point field goal percentage	FT%	Free throw percentage
RPG	Rebounds per game	APG	Assists per game	SPG	Steals per game
BPG	Blocks per game	PPG	Points per game	**Bold**	Career high

Year	Team	GP	GS	MPG	FG%	3P%	FT%	RPG	APG	SPG	BPG	PPG
1991	Brisbane	2			.000	.000	.000	.5	.0	.0	.0	.0
1993	Townsville	22			.457	.286	.692	2.9	2.3	1.1	.4	5.9
1994	Townsville	18			**.484**	**.471**	.474	3.2	1.6	1.0	.5	4.3
1995	Townsville	26			.477	.351	.636	4.2	**2.4**	1.2	**.7**	7.4
1996	Townsville	25			.404	.366	.529	3.5	1.6	1.2	.4	5.8
1997	Townsville	**30**			.482	.419	.706	4.5	2.3	**1.6**	.5	**12.3**
1998	Townsville	**30**			.415	.366	**.778**	**4.7**	1.6	1.3	.3	7.5
1998–99	Townsville	26			.304	.275	.429	1.4	1.2	.5	.1	2.4
1999–2000	Brisbane	28			.390	.273	.448	2.6	1.4	.6	.2	5.4
**Career**		207			.434	.355	.623	3.4	1.8	1.1	.4	6.5
