= 1997 NBL season =

Professional basketball season

- League: National Basketball League
- Season: 1997
- Dates: 11 April – 1 November 1997
- Teams: 11
- TV partners: Australia: Network Ten; Fox Sports

Regular season
- Season champions: S.E. Melbourne Magic
- Season MVP: (Australia) Andrew Gaze (Melbourne)

Finals
- Champions: Melbourne Tigers (2nd title)
- Runners-up: S.E. Melbourne Magic
- Semifinalists: North Melbourne Giants; Perth Wildcats
- Finals MVP: (United States) Lanard Copeland (Melbourne)

Statistical leaders
Points	(Australia) Andrew Gaze (Melbourne)	31.5

NBL seasons
- ← 1996 1998 →

The 1997 NBL season was the 19th season of competition since its establishment in 1979. A total of 11 teams contest the league. The Hobart Devils, Geelong Supercats and Gold Coast Rollers did not return this season. The Melbourne Tigers were the champions.

== Regular season ==
The 1997 regular season took place over 24 rounds between 11 April 1997 and 29 September 1997.

=== Round 1 ===
Date	Home	Score	Away	Venue	Crowd	Boxscore
11/04/1997	North Melbourne Giants	85–81	Sydney Kings	Melbourne Sports and Entertainment Centre	N/A	boxscore
11/04/1997	Perth Wildcats	84–104	South East Melbourne Magic	Perth Entertainment Centre	N/A	boxscore
11/04/1997	Brisbane Bullets	111–105	Melbourne Tigers	Brisbane Convention & Exhibition Centre	N/A	boxscore
12/04/1997	Canberra Cannons	83–97	North Melbourne Giants	AIS Arena	N/A	boxscore
12/04/1997	Illawarra Hawks	96–112	Newcastle Falcons	Beaton Park Stadium	N/A	boxscore
12/04/1997	Townsville Suns	113–115	Melbourne Tigers	Townsville Entertainment Centre	N/A	boxscore
13/04/1997	Adelaide 36ers	83–85	South East Melbourne Magic	Adelaide Arena	N/A	boxscore

=== Round 2 ===
Date	Home	Score	Away	Venue	Crowd	Boxscore
18/04/1997	Newcastle Falcons	101–109	North Melbourne Giants	Newcastle Entertainment Centre	N/A	boxscore
19/04/1997	Sydney Kings	92–94	North Melbourne Giants	Sydney Entertainment Centre	N/A	boxscore
19/04/1997	Canberra Cannons	97–85	Adelaide 36ers	AIS Arena	N/A	boxscore
19/04/1997	Illawarra Hawks	101–108	Perth Wildcats	Beaton Park Stadium	N/A	boxscore
19/04/1997	Brisbane Bullets	77–99	South East Melbourne Magic	Brisbane Convention & Exhibition Centre	N/A	boxscore
20/04/1997	Townsville Suns	104–86	South East Melbourne Magic	Townsville Entertainment Centre	N/A	boxscore
21/04/1997	Melbourne Tigers	100–103	Perth Wildcats	Melbourne Park	N/A	boxscore

=== Round 3 ===
Date	Home	Score	Away	Venue	Crowd	Boxscore
25/04/1997	Melbourne Tigers	69–89	Adelaide 36ers	Melbourne Park	N/A	boxscore
25/04/1997	Sydney Kings	97–92	Perth Wildcats	Sydney Entertainment Centre	N/A	boxscore
25/04/1997	Brisbane Bullets	96–104	Townsville Suns	Brisbane Convention & Exhibition Centre	N/A	boxscore
26/04/1997	South East Melbourne Magic	96–97	Melbourne Tigers	Melbourne Park	N/A	boxscore
26/04/1997	Newcastle Falcons	101–122	Perth Wildcats	Newcastle Entertainment Centre	N/A	boxscore
26/04/1997	Townsville Suns	97–91	Sydney Kings	Townsville Entertainment Centre	N/A	boxscore
26/04/1997	Illawarra Hawks	98–117	Canberra Cannons	Beaton Park Stadium	N/A	boxscore

=== Round 4 ===
Date	Home	Score	Away	Venue	Crowd	Boxscore
2/05/1997	Sydney Kings	112–108	Townsville Suns	Sydney Entertainment Centre	N/A	boxscore
2/05/1997	Illawarra Hawks	121–103	Melbourne Tigers	Beaton Park Stadium	N/A	boxscore
2/05/1997	Canberra Cannons	98–81	Brisbane Bullets	AIS Arena	N/A	boxscore
3/05/1997	Adelaide 36ers	92–99	North Melbourne Giants	Adelaide Arena	N/A	boxscore
3/05/1997	South East Melbourne Magic	123–106	Illawarra Hawks	Whitlam Centre	N/A	boxscore
3/05/1997	Melbourne Tigers	85–108	Perth Wildcats	Melbourne Park	N/A	boxscore
3/05/1997	Brisbane Bullets	82–71	Sydney Kings	Brisbane Convention & Exhibition Centre	N/A	boxscore
4/05/1997	Newcastle Falcons	110–104	Townsville Suns	Newcastle Entertainment Centre	N/A	boxscore

=== Round 5 ===
Date	Home	Score	Away	Venue	Crowd	Boxscore
7/05/1997	South East Melbourne Magic	78–89	Canberra Cannons	Melbourne Park	N/A	boxscore
9/05/1997	Perth Wildcats	102–84	Adelaide 36ers	Perth Entertainment Centre	N/A	boxscore
9/05/1997	Townsville Suns	109–97	Illawarra Hawks	Townsville Entertainment Centre	N/A	boxscore
10/05/1997	North Melbourne Giants	77–88	South East Melbourne Magic	Melbourne Sports and Entertainment Centre	N/A	boxscore
10/05/1997	Adelaide 36ers	106–93	Canberra Cannons	Adelaide Arena	N/A	boxscore
11/05/1997	Melbourne Tigers	109–104	Sydney Kings	Melbourne Park	N/A	boxscore

=== Round 6 ===
Date	Home	Score	Away	Venue	Crowd	Boxscore
16/05/1997	Perth Wildcats	82–86	Brisbane Bullets	Perth Entertainment Centre	N/A	boxscore
16/05/1997	Canberra Cannons	105–88	Illawarra Hawks	AIS Arena	N/A	boxscore
16/05/1997	Townsville Suns	119–95	Melbourne Tigers	Townsville Entertainment Centre	N/A	boxscore
17/05/1997	South East Melbourne Magic	96–92	Perth Wildcats	Melbourne Park	N/A	boxscore
17/05/1997	North Melbourne Giants	111–98	Newcastle Falcons	Melbourne Sports and Entertainment Centre	N/A	boxscore
17/05/1997	Sydney Kings	104–78	Canberra Cannons	Sydney Entertainment Centre	N/A	boxscore
18/05/1997	Adelaide 36ers	85–78	Brisbane Bullets	Adelaide Arena	N/A	boxscore
18/05/1997	Newcastle Falcons	95–126	Illawarra Hawks	Newcastle Entertainment Centre	N/A	boxscore

=== Round 7 ===
Date	Home	Score	Away	Venue	Crowd	Boxscore
23/05/1997	North Melbourne Giants	122–114	Townsville Suns	Melbourne Sports and Entertainment Centre	N/A	boxscore
23/05/1997	Canberra Cannons	93–81	Newcastle Falcons	AIS Arena	N/A	boxscore
23/05/1997	Illawarra Hawks	107–119	Adelaide 36ers	Beaton Park Stadium	N/A	boxscore
24/05/1997	Sydney Kings	96–107	Adelaide 36ers	Sydney Entertainment Centre	N/A	boxscore
24/05/1997	Perth Wildcats	96–83	North Melbourne Giants	Perth Entertainment Centre	N/A	boxscore
24/05/1997	Newcastle Falcons	85–117	South East Melbourne Magic	Newcastle Entertainment Centre	N/A	boxscore
24/05/1997	Brisbane Bullets	110–92	Illawarra Hawks	Brisbane Convention & Exhibition Centre	N/A	boxscore
25/05/1997	Townsville Suns	100–89	Canberra Cannons	Townsville Entertainment Centre	N/A	boxscore

=== Round 8 ===
Date	Home	Score	Away	Venue	Crowd	Boxscore
29/05/1997	Canberra Cannons	113–99	Melbourne Tigers	AIS Arena	N/A	boxscore
30/05/1997	Brisbane Bullets	98–103	Sydney Kings	Brisbane Convention & Exhibition Centre	N/A	boxscore
31/05/1997	North Melbourne Giants	97–102	Brisbane Bullets	Melbourne Sports and Entertainment Centre	N/A	boxscore
31/05/1997	Sydney Kings	106–101	Canberra Cannons	Sydney Entertainment Centre	N/A	boxscore
31/05/1997	Illawarra Hawks	97–126	Townsville Suns	Beaton Park Stadium	N/A	boxscore
31/05/1997	Newcastle Falcons	108–100	Adelaide 36ers	Newcastle Entertainment Centre	N/A	boxscore

=== Round 9 ===
Date	Home	Score	Away	Venue	Crowd	Boxscore
5/06/1997	North Melbourne Giants	104–90	Illawarra Hawks	Melbourne Sports and Entertainment Centre	N/A	boxscore
5/06/1997	Canberra Cannons	78–82	Brisbane Bullets	AIS Arena	N/A	boxscore
6/06/1997	Townsville Suns	102–107	Adelaide 36ers	Townsville Entertainment Centre	N/A	boxscore
6/06/1997	Newcastle Falcons	106–98	Brisbane Bullets	Newcastle Entertainment Centre	N/A	boxscore
7/06/1997	Perth Wildcats	109–89	Illawarra Hawks	Perth Entertainment Centre	N/A	boxscore
7/06/1997	Sydney Kings	124–117	Melbourne Tigers	Sydney Entertainment Centre	N/A	boxscore

=== Round 10 ===
Date	Home	Score	Away	Venue	Crowd	Boxscore
11/06/1997	South East Melbourne Magic	80–55	Canberra Cannons	Melbourne Park	N/A	boxscore
13/06/1997	Melbourne Tigers	96–106	Sydney Kings	Melbourne Park	N/A	boxscore
14/06/1997	Illawarra Hawks	104–111	North Melbourne Giants	Beaton Park Stadium	N/A	boxscore
14/06/1997	Adelaide 36ers	99–114	Sydney Kings	Adelaide Arena	N/A	boxscore
14/06/1997	South East Melbourne Magic	87–83	Brisbane Bullets	Melbourne Park	N/A	boxscore
14/06/1997	Perth Wildcats	109–90	Townsville Suns	Perth Entertainment Centre	N/A	boxscore
14/06/1997	Canberra Cannons	104–91	Newcastle Falcons	AIS Arena	N/A	boxscore
15/06/1997	Brisbane Bullets	116–108	Newcastle Falcons	Brisbane Convention & Exhibition Centre	N/A	boxscore
16/06/1997	North Melbourne Giants	99–96	Townsville Suns	Melbourne Sports and Entertainment Centre	N/A	boxscore

=== Round 11 ===
Date	Home	Score	Away	Venue	Crowd	Boxscore
20/06/1997	Illawarra Hawks	107–123	Sydney Kings	Beaton Park Stadium	N/A	boxscore
20/06/1997	Brisbane Bullets	100–91	North Melbourne Giants	Brisbane Convention & Exhibition Centre	N/A	boxscore
21/06/1997	Melbourne Tigers	115–104	North Melbourne Giants	Melbourne Park	N/A	boxscore
21/06/1997	Sydney Kings	88–89	South East Melbourne Magic	Sydney Entertainment Centre	N/A	boxscore
21/06/1997	Perth Wildcats	90–102	Newcastle Falcons	Perth Entertainment Centre	N/A	boxscore
22/06/1997	Adelaide 36ers	141–99	Newcastle Falcons	Adelaide Arena	N/A	boxscore

=== Round 12 ===
Date	Home	Score	Away	Venue	Crowd	Boxscore
27/06/1997	North Melbourne Giants	99–114	Adelaide 36ers	Melbourne Sports and Entertainment Centre	N/A	boxscore
27/06/1997	Canberra Cannons	92–86	Perth Wildcats	AIS Arena	N/A	boxscore
28/06/1997	South East Melbourne Magic	127–100	Sydney Kings	Melbourne Park	N/A	boxscore
28/06/1997	Illawarra Hawks	105–92	Adelaide 36ers	Beaton Park Stadium	N/A	boxscore
28/06/1997	Newcastle Falcons	87–98	Melbourne Tigers	Newcastle Entertainment Centre	N/A	boxscore
29/06/1997	Melbourne Tigers	82–92	Canberra Cannons	Melbourne Park	N/A	boxscore
29/06/1997	Perth Wildcats	112–92	Sydney Kings	Perth Entertainment Centre	N/A	boxscore
29/06/1997	Townsville Suns	98–94	North Melbourne Giants	Townsville Entertainment Centre	N/A	boxscore

=== Round 13 ===
Date	Home	Score	Away	Venue	Crowd	Boxscore
4/07/1997	Townsville Suns	81–84	South East Melbourne Magic	Townsville Entertainment Centre	N/A	boxscore
5/07/1997	Perth Wildcats	97–71	Canberra Cannons	Perth Entertainment Centre	N/A	boxscore
5/07/1997	Adelaide 36ers	112–100	North Melbourne Giants	Adelaide Arena	N/A	boxscore
5/07/1997	Illawarra Hawks	93–102	Melbourne Tigers	Beaton Park Stadium	N/A	boxscore
5/07/1997	Newcastle Falcons	97–86	Sydney Kings	Newcastle Entertainment Centre	N/A	boxscore
6/07/1997	Brisbane Bullets	106–101	Newcastle Falcons	Brisbane Convention & Exhibition Centre	N/A	boxscore
7/07/1997	Melbourne Tigers	86–94	North Melbourne Giants	Melbourne Park	N/A	boxscore

=== Round 14 ===
Date	Home	Score	Away	Venue	Crowd	Boxscore
9/07/1997	South East Melbourne Magic	113–105	Adelaide 36ers	Melbourne Park	N/A	boxscore
11/07/1997	Adelaide 36ers	107–112	Perth Wildcats	Adelaide Arena	N/A	boxscore
11/07/1997	Newcastle Falcons	84–102	North Melbourne Giants	Newcastle Entertainment Centre	N/A	boxscore
12/07/1997	Melbourne Tigers	96–89	South East Melbourne Magic	Melbourne Park	N/A	boxscore
12/07/1997	Sydney Kings	109–85	Brisbane Bullets	Sydney Entertainment Centre	N/A	boxscore
12/07/1997	Perth Wildcats	106–86	Illawarra Hawks	Perth Entertainment Centre	N/A	boxscore
12/07/1997	Townsville Suns	97–95	Canberra Cannons	Townsville Entertainment Centre	N/A	boxscore
13/07/1997	Brisbane Bullets	87–62	Canberra Cannons	Brisbane Convention & Exhibition Centre	N/A	boxscore

=== Round 15 ===
Date	Home	Score	Away	Venue	Crowd	Boxscore
18/07/1997	Melbourne Tigers	94–93	Canberra Cannons	Melbourne Park	N/A	boxscore
18/07/1997	Sydney Kings	92–109	Newcastle Falcons	Sydney Entertainment Centre	N/A	boxscore
18/07/1997	Illawarra Hawks	97–105	South East Melbourne Magic	Beaton Park Stadium	N/A	boxscore
18/07/1997	Brisbane Bullets	91–88	Perth Wildcats	Brisbane Convention & Exhibition Centre	N/A	boxscore
19/07/1997	Adelaide 36ers	90–92	Newcastle Falcons	Adelaide Arena	N/A	boxscore
19/07/1997	South East Melbourne Magic	99–86	North Melbourne Giants	Melbourne Park	N/A	boxscore
19/07/1997	Townsville Suns	102–90	Perth Wildcats	Townsville Entertainment Centre	N/A	boxscore

=== Round 16 ===
Date	Home	Score	Away	Venue	Crowd	Boxscore
1/08/1997	Townsville Suns	101–104	Brisbane Bullets	Townsville Entertainment Centre	N/A	boxscore
2/08/1997	Adelaide 36ers	112–82	Illawarra Hawks	Adelaide Arena	N/A	boxscore

=== Round 17 ===
Date	Home	Score	Away	Venue	Crowd	Boxscore
8/08/1997	Adelaide 36ers	79–84	Townsville Suns	Adelaide Arena	N/A	boxscore
9/08/1997	Brisbane Bullets	91–94	Melbourne Tigers	Brisbane Convention & Exhibition Centre	N/A	boxscore

=== Round 18 ===
Date	Home	Score	Away	Venue	Crowd	Boxscore
15/08/1997	North Melbourne Giants	86–97	Melbourne Tigers	Melbourne Sports and Entertainment Centre	N/A	boxscore
15/08/1997	Newcastle Falcons	119–107	Canberra Cannons	Newcastle Entertainment Centre	N/A	boxscore
15/08/1997	Townsville Suns	124–103	Illawarra Hawks	Townsville Entertainment Centre	N/A	boxscore
16/08/1997	Perth Wildcats	97–92	Sydney Kings	Perth Entertainment Centre	N/A	boxscore
16/08/1997	Adelaide 36ers	97–93	South East Melbourne Magic	Adelaide Arena	N/A	boxscore
16/08/1997	Canberra Cannons	99–102	North Melbourne Giants	AIS Arena	N/A	boxscore
17/08/1997	Brisbane Bullets	80–81	Illawarra Hawks	Brisbane Convention & Exhibition Centre	N/A	boxscore

=== Round 19 ===
Date	Home	Score	Away	Venue	Crowd	Boxscore
20/08/1997	South East Melbourne Magic	120–90	Townsville Suns	Melbourne Park	N/A	boxscore
22/08/1997	Perth Wildcats	98–73	Brisbane Bullets	Perth Entertainment Centre	N/A	boxscore
23/08/1997	North Melbourne Giants	94–83	South East Melbourne Magic	Melbourne Sports and Entertainment Centre	N/A	boxscore
23/08/1997	Sydney Kings	100–112	Adelaide 36ers	Sydney Entertainment Centre	N/A	boxscore
23/08/1997	Newcastle Falcons	114–130	Townsville Suns	Newcastle Entertainment Centre	N/A	boxscore
23/08/1997	Canberra Cannons	93–96	Illawarra Hawks	AIS Arena	N/A	boxscore
25/08/1997	Melbourne Tigers	128–107	Newcastle Falcons	Melbourne Park	N/A	boxscore

=== Round 20 ===
Date	Home	Score	Away	Venue	Crowd	Boxscore
29/08/1997	North Melbourne Giants	103–86	Perth Wildcats	Melbourne Sports and Entertainment Centre	N/A	boxscore
29/08/1997	Adelaide 36ers	74–77	Brisbane Bullets	Adelaide Arena	N/A	boxscore
30/08/1997	Canberra Cannons	92–67	South East Melbourne Magic	AIS Arena	N/A	boxscore
30/08/1997	Illawarra Hawks	85–97	North Melbourne Giants	Beaton Park Stadium	N/A	boxscore
30/08/1997	Newcastle Falcons	98–95	Perth Wildcats	Newcastle Entertainment Centre	N/A	boxscore
30/08/1997	Sydney Kings	93–112	Townsville Suns	Sydney Entertainment Centre	N/A	boxscore
31/08/1997	Melbourne Tigers	128–98	Illawarra Hawks	Melbourne Park	N/A	boxscore
2/09/1997	South East Melbourne Magic	94–78	Newcastle Falcons	Melbourne Park	N/A	boxscore

=== Round 21 ===
Date	Home	Score	Away	Venue	Crowd	Boxscore
5/09/1997	Illawarra Hawks	71–82	South East Melbourne Magic	Beaton Park Stadium	N/A	boxscore
6/09/1997	South East Melbourne Magic	88–82	Brisbane Bullets	Melbourne Park	N/A	boxscore
6/09/1997	Sydney Kings	95–77	Illawarra Hawks	Sydney Entertainment Centre	N/A	boxscore
6/09/1997	Perth Wildcats	101–107	Adelaide 36ers	Perth Entertainment Centre	N/A	boxscore
6/09/1997	Newcastle Falcons	112–120	Melbourne Tigers	Newcastle Entertainment Centre	N/A	boxscore
6/09/1997	Canberra Cannons	101–98	Townsville Suns	AIS Arena	N/A	boxscore
7/09/1997	Melbourne Tigers	124–106	Townsville Suns	Melbourne Park	N/A	boxscore
7/09/1997	North Melbourne Giants	117–96	Sydney Kings	Melbourne Sports and Entertainment Centre	N/A	boxscore

=== Round 22 ===
Date	Home	Score	Away	Venue	Crowd	Boxscore
10/09/1997	South East Melbourne Magic	97–74	Perth Wildcats	Melbourne Park	N/A	boxscore
12/09/1997	Adelaide 36ers	99–96	Townsville Suns	Adelaide Arena	N/A	boxscore
13/09/1997	Perth Wildcats	88–87	Canberra Cannons	Perth Entertainment Centre	N/A	boxscore
13/09/1997	Newcastle Falcons	110–97	Illawarra Hawks	Newcastle Entertainment Centre	N/A	boxscore
13/09/1997	Brisbane Bullets	82–76	Townsville Suns	Brisbane Convention & Exhibition Centre	N/A	boxscore
13/09/1997	Melbourne Tigers	103–90	Adelaide 36ers	Melbourne Park	N/A	boxscore
15/09/1997	North Melbourne Giants	92–94	Canberra Cannons	Melbourne Sports and Entertainment Centre	N/A	boxscore
15/09/1997	Sydney Kings	90–85	Newcastle Falcons	Sydney Entertainment Centre	N/A	boxscore

=== Round 23 ===
Date	Home	Score	Away	Venue	Crowd	Boxscore
19/09/1997	Illawarra Hawks	101–88	Sydney Kings	Beaton Park Stadium	N/A	boxscore
19/09/1997	Brisbane Bullets	86–85	Adelaide 36ers	Brisbane Convention & Exhibition Centre	N/A	boxscore
20/09/1997	North Melbourne Giants	92–90	Brisbane Bullets	Melbourne Sports and Entertainment Centre	N/A	boxscore
20/09/1997	Sydney Kings	98–103	South East Melbourne Magic	Sydney Entertainment Centre	N/A	boxscore
20/09/1997	Perth Wildcats	98–107	Melbourne Tigers	Perth Entertainment Centre	N/A	boxscore
20/09/1997	Canberra Cannons	120–97	Adelaide 36ers	AIS Arena	N/A	boxscore
20/09/1997	Townsville Suns	103–106	Newcastle Falcons	Townsville Entertainment Centre	N/A	boxscore
22/09/1997	South East Melbourne Magic	70–102	Melbourne Tigers	Melbourne Park	N/A	boxscore

=== Round 24 ===
Date	Home	Score	Away	Venue	Crowd	Boxscore
24/09/1997	North Melbourne Giants	102–106	Perth Wildcats	Melbourne Sports and Entertainment Centre	N/A	boxscore
26/09/1997	Townsville Suns	100–102	Perth Wildcats	Townsville Entertainment Centre	N/A	boxscore
27/09/1997	Adelaide 36ers	104–110	Melbourne Tigers	Adelaide Arena	N/A	boxscore
27/09/1997	Illawarra Hawks	115–90	Brisbane Bullets	Beaton Park Stadium	N/A	boxscore
27/09/1997	Canberra Cannons	98–95	Sydney Kings	AIS Arena	N/A	boxscore
28/09/1997	South East Melbourne Magic	108–99	Newcastle Falcons	Dandenong Basketball Stadium	N/A	boxscore
29/09/1997	Melbourne Tigers	116–107	Brisbane Bullets	Melbourne Park	N/A	boxscore

== Ladder ==
This is the ladder at the end of season, before the finals. The top 6 teams qualified for the finals series.

Pos	1997 NBL season											
Pos	Team	Pld	W	L	PCT	Last 5	Streak	Home	Away	PF	PA	PP
1	S.E. Melbourne Magic	30	22	8	73.33%	4–1	W1	12–3	10–5	2850	2662	107.06%
2	Melbourne Tigers	30	19	11	63.33%	5–0	W13	9–6	10–5	3092	3028	102.11%
3	North Melbourne Giants	30	18	12	60.00%	3–2	L1	9–6	9–6	2943	2881	102.15%
4	Perth Wildcats	30	17	13	56.67%	3–2	W2	10–5	7–8	2933	2825	103.82%
5	Brisbane Bullets^{1}	30	15	15	50.00%	2–3	L3	10–5	5–10	2731	2786	98.03%
6	Canberra Cannons^{1}	30	15	15	50.00%	4–1	W3	11–4	4–11	2789	2773	100.58%
7	Adelaide 36ers^{2}	30	14	16	46.67%	1–4	L4	7–8	7–8	2973	2922	101.75%
8	Townsville Suns^{2}	30	14	16	46.67%	0–5	L6	9–6	5–10	3084	3015	102.29%
9	Newcastle Falcons^{3}	30	12	18	40.00%	2–3	L1	7–8	5–10	2995	3173	94.39%
10	Sydney Kings^{3}	30	12	18	40.00%	1–4	L3	8–7	4–11	2938	2991	98.23%
11	Illawarra Hawks	30	7	23	23.33%	2–3	W2	4–11	3–12	2906	3178	91.44%

Updated to match(es) played on 29 September 1997. Source: NBL.com.au

The NBL tie-breaker system as outlined in the NBL Rules and Regulations states that in the case of an identical win–loss record, the results in games played between the teams will determine order of seeding.

^{1}Brisbane Bullets won Head-to-Head (2-1).

^{2}Adelaide 36ers won Head-to-Head (2-1).

^{3}Newcastle Falcons won Head-to-Head (2-1).

== Finals ==
=== Playoff bracket ===
Elimination Finals
4	Perth Wildcats	81	88	X
5	Brisbane Bullets	79	71	X
3	North Melbourne Giants	93	108	102
6	Canberra Cannons	104	98	75

Semifinals
1	S.E. Melbourne Magic	92	96	X
4	Perth Wildcats	82	69	X
2	Melbourne Tigers	107	112	X
3	North Melbourne Giants	99	105	X

Grand Final
1	S.E. Melbourne Magic	74	84	83
2	Melbourne Tigers	111	78	93

=== Elimination Finals ===
Date	Home	Score	Away	Venue	Crowd	Boxscore
3/10/1997	Canberra Cannons	104–93	North Melbourne Giants	AIS Arena	N/A	boxscore
4/10/1997	Perth Wildcats	81–79	Brisbane Bullets	Perth Entertainment Centre	N/A	boxscore
5/10/1997	North Melbourne Giants	108–98	Canberra Cannons	Melbourne Sports and Entertainment Centre	N/A	boxscore
7/10/1997	Brisbane Bullets	71–88	Perth Wildcats	Brisbane Convention & Exhibition Centre	N/A	boxscore
7/10/1997	North Melbourne Giants	102–75	Canberra Cannons	Melbourne Sports and Entertainment Centre	N/A	boxscore

=== Semi-finals ===
Date	Home	Score	Away	Venue	Crowd	Boxscore
13/10/1997	Perth Wildcats	82–92	South East Melbourne Magic	Perth Entertainment Centre	N/A	boxscore
15/10/1997	North Melbourne Giants	99–107	Melbourne Tigers	Melbourne Sports and Entertainment Centre	N/A	boxscore
17/10/1997	South East Melbourne Magic	96–69	Perth Wildcats	Melbourne Park	N/A	boxscore
18/10/1997	Melbourne Tigers	112–105	North Melbourne Giants	Melbourne Park	N/A	boxscore

=== Grand Final ===
Date	Home	Score	Away	Venue	Crowd	Boxscore
25/10/1997	Melbourne Tigers	111–74	South East Melbourne Magic	Melbourne Park	N/A	boxscore
29/10/1997	South East Melbourne Magic	84–78	Melbourne Tigers	Melbourne Park	N/A	boxscore
1/11/1997	South East Melbourne Magic	83–93	Melbourne Tigers	Melbourne Park	N/A	boxscore

== 1997 NBL statistics leaders ==
Category	Player	Team	Stat
Points per game	Andrew Gaze	Melbourne Tigers	30.9
Rebounds per game	Clarence Tyson	Townsville Suns	13.7
Assists per game	Darryl McDonald	North Melbourne Giants	8.9
Steals per game	Darryl McDonald	North Melbourne Giants	3.3
Blocks per game	Simon Dwight	Canberra Cannons	4.3
Free throw percentage	Dylan Rigdon	Illawarra Hawks	88.2%

== NBL awards ==
- Most Valuable Player: Andrew Gaze, Melbourne Tigers
- Most Valuable Player Grand Final: Lanard Copeland, Melbourne Tigers
- Best Defensive Player: Mike Kelly, South East Melbourne Magic
- Most Improved Player: Ben Pepper, Newcastle Falcons
- Rookie of the Year: Matthew Nielsen, Sydney Kings
- Coach of the Year: Lindsay Gaze, Melbourne Tigers & Brian Goorjian, South East Melbourne Magic

== All NBL Team ==
#	Player	Team
PG	Derek Rucker	Townsville Suns
SG	Robert Rose	Canberra Cannons
SF	Andrew Gaze	Melbourne Tigers
PF	Clarence Tyson	Townsville Suns
C	Mark Bradtke	Melbourne Tigers
