= Russell Hinder =

Australian basketball player

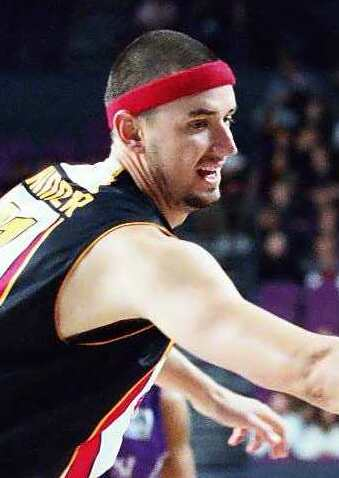
- Hinder with the Hunter Pirates during the 2004–05 season

Personal information
- Born: 10 July 1979 (age 47) Sydney
- Listed height: 208 cm (6 ft 10 in)
- Listed weight: 243 lb (110 kg)

Career information
- High school: St Patrick's Marist College (Sydney, New South Wales)
- College: San Francisco (1998–2000); Augusta (2000–2001)
- Playing career: 2001–2014
- Position: Power forward / Centre

Career history
- 2001–2004: West Sydney Razorbacks
- 2004–2006: Hunter Pirates
- 2005: Otago Nuggets
- 2006–2008: Sydney Kings
- 2008–2014: Townsville Crocodiles
Medals
Men's basketball
Representing Australia
Gold medal – first place	2006 Melbourne	Team competition

Russell Hinder (born 10 July 1979) is an Australian former professional basketball player who played 13 seasons in the NBL. In 1997, he attended the Australian Institute of Sport.

Hinder attended the University of San Francisco before transferring to Augusta State University in 2000.

He then came back to sign up with the West Sydney Razorbacks in which his last season with the club he not only lead the team to a NBL Grand Final, his season performance got him third in the Most Improved player award. He then went to play for the Hunter Pirates where he spent one year before they left the league.

He then joined the Sydney Kings where he earned himself a spot in the Australian Boomers team where the Boomers won the Gold Medal at the 2006 Commonwealth Games and also a spot at the FIBA World Championships that same year. He also led the Sydney Kings to two Grand Finals but was unsuccessful losing to the Melbourne Tigers on both occasions. Just like the Pirates, the Kings had to fold at the end of the 2007/08 NBL season.

Without a club, Russell was about to retire before he signed with the Townsville Crocodiles as just days before he signed the Crocodiles lost their star centre Ben Pepper who had "family issues". Once Hinder landed in Townsville, he announced that he wanted to help the Crocs win an NBL championship as the team had not won a championship and Hinder has been in three NBL finals but has never won a series.

Hinder won the 2008–09 Townsville Crocodiles' Players' Player Award. He was sidelined for the entire 2011–12 NBL season with a broken leg.

On 4 November 2013, Hinder announced he would be retiring following the conclusion of the 2013–14 season. On 22 March 2014, Hinder played his 350th and final NBL game in an 88–79 victory over the Sydney Kings. In 31 minutes of action, he recorded 13 points, 8 rebounds, 1 assist and 1 block.
