= Townsville Crocodiles =

Former Australian professional men's basketball team

- League: NBL
- Founded: 1993
- Folded: 2016
- History: Townsville Suns; 1993–1998; Townsville Crocodiles; 1998–2016
- Arena: Townsville Entertainment Centre (1993–2014, 2015–2016); Townsville RSL Stadium (2014–2015)
- Capacity: TEC – 5,257; RSL – 2,500
- Location: Townsville, Queensland
- Team colors: Green, yellow, blue, red
- Championships: 0
- Retired numbers: 2 (7, 21)
- Website: Crocodiles.com.au
Home	Away

The Townsville Crocodiles were an Australian professional men's basketball team based in the North Queensland city of Townsville. They competed in the National Basketball League (NBL) and played their home games at the Townsville Entertainment and Convention Centre. Between their inception in 1993 and their final season in 2015–16, the Crocodiles enjoyed financial stability and sustained community support, but on-court success eluded them.

== Team history ==
=== 1986–1992: Gaining admission into the NBL ===
Former Brisbane Bullets guard Mark Bragg, a Townsville resident, began campaigning to bring an NBL franchise to Townsville in the late 1980s. The franchise adopted the name of Townsville's State League team, becoming the Townsville Suns. The NBL was ready to admit the Suns, along with fellow Queenslanders the Gold Coast Cougars, in 1990, but financial backing for the Suns' venue fell through.

Local government then got behind Bragg's bid, and the Townsville Entertainment and Convention Centre was completed in time for the Suns' debut in February 1993.

=== 1993–1998: Early years ===
With Bragg at the helm as head coach, the Suns struggled during their debut season, but it only took five games before they recorded their first-ever NBL win, a victory over the Newcastle Falcons. Townsville broke the mould in 1993, becoming the first Australian team to hire an 'import' player from a country other than the United States; Lithuanian player Rimas Kurtinaitis was a crucial part of the team during their debut season. The Suns finished 4–22 and took the wooden spoon.

Townsville would not reach the playoffs in its first six seasons, although they came perilously close in the 1997 season; needing only one win from their final six games to ensure a historic playoff appearance, the Suns went 0–6 after centre Clarence Tyson suffered a season-ending knee injury in Canberra. After a disappointing 1998 campaign, Mark Bragg was sacked as head coach. With 151 games played out of the Suns' 164, Jason Cameron was the only player to have played in all six Suns seasons.

Throughout, Townsville fans stuck by the team, ensuring the club set an Australian record for attendances; the Suns sold out their first 69 games at the "Furnace" (capacity 4,141), a streak that was only broken after the venue was expanded for the 1998 season.

=== 1998–2001: Name change and finals basketball ===
It was a very different team that took the court in the 1998/99 season. The team had been involved in a dispute with the NBA's Phoenix Suns, who held the "Suns" trademark in Australia. Faced with the prospect of paying Phoenix royalties on merchandise sales, the team changed its name to the Townsville Crocodiles. New head coach Ian Stacker took the reins, and immediately attracted top-name talent like Australian Olympic player Sam Mackinnon, but it would take one more season before Townsville's long-suffering fans saw playoff basketball.

The Crocodiles finished second in the NBL in 1999/2000 with a 22–6 record, meaning they got a first-round bye in the NBL playoffs. But they faced a battle-hardened Perth Wildcats team in the semi-finals, and were defeated 2–1 in front of their disappointed home fans. Perth would go on to win the championship.

The Crocs again went 22–6 the following year and, under the league's new playoff system, eliminated both the Sydney Kings and the Victoria Titans. It came down to the grand final series, where the team lost 2 games to 1- 95–92 in the final game- after a thrilling fourth-quarter comeback by the Wollongong Hawks.

=== 2002–2006: Missed opportunities ===
Townsville missed the playoffs in 2002 and the 2003 season looked no better, but the Crocodiles strung together a 16-game winning streak to again finish second on the NBL ladder. (The streak equaled an NBL record.) Townsville lost the opening-round series 2–1 to Wollongong, but by virtue of NBL rules, got a second chance to advance; they were then finally eliminated by the eventual champion Sydney Kings.

After another disappointing season in 2005–06, Townsville head coach Ian Stacker's contract was not renewed. The Crocodiles again failed to make the playoffs.

Trevor Gleeson was appointed coach and the team improved on their failed 2005–06 season by making the play-offs. They won their first final against one of the newcomers in the Singapore Slingers but lost their second to the Sydney Kings.

=== 2006–2009: Return to finals ===
2007–08 saw the Crocs struggle in their first ten games, only winning three matches. Before the season, the team was struggling with injuries to both 7-foot centre's Ben Pepper (back) and Greg Vanderjagt (knee) along with swingman Bradley Sheridan (back). The team ended up losing newly signed import Rosell Ellis who suffered a freak of an injury when he tore his pectoral muscle during a weight session just after two matches. In those two matches saw Ellis get 27 points and 11 rebounds in both matches. The Crocs then brought in streetball legend Corey 'Homicide' Wiliams which saw the Crocs turn back into a strong team. With also help from the crocs bench saw them finish the season in fifth place with a record of 17–13. But just like the 2006–07 season, saw the crocs win their first game against another newcomer Gold Coast Blaze but were once again saw them smashed by the team who finished one win higher than the Crocs in the Perth Wildcats 96–78.

The crocs have now made a push to make it to the top four in the 2008–09 season when they re-signed imports Williams and Ellis and also signings Brad Williamson and Steven Broom from the Brisbane Bullets and former Boomer Russell Hinder.

The 2008/09 season saw them struggle to have a full roster with Bradley Sheridan (ankles), Ben Pepper (personal reasons) and Steven Broom (shoulder) leaving the club before the season had even began. The local fans were able to rally behind the club to finish 5th. The Crocs were unable to make the grand final series as they were knocked out by eventual champions South Dragons.

=== 2013–2016: Financial troubles and disbandment ===
On 8 April 2013, the Crocodiles announced that Barrier Reef Basketball Pty Ltd was relinquishing its National Basketball League license, putting the Crocodiles' 2013–14 season in doubt. In September 2013, the Crocodiles re-entered the league as a community owned club under head coach, Shawn Dennis.

In June 2014, the Crocodiles announced that the Townsville RSL Stadium would be their new home court for the 2014–15 season. Following the 2014–15 season, the Crocodiles decided to place themselves into Voluntary Administration. On 21 May 2015, they re-entered the league for a second time after regaining control of the Deed of Company Arrangement and subsequently received NBL approval to re-enter the competition. The Crocodiles also announced that they would be returning to the Townsville Entertainment and Convention Centre for the 2015–16 season. In February 2016, the Queensland Police seized a compressed air launcher use by the team for over ten years to launch folded T-shirts into the crowd, after the device was deemed to be a category B weapon.

On 14 April 2016, the Crocodiles pulled out of the 2016–17 season due to financial pressures.

== Retired Jerseys ==
- #7 David Blades
- #21 Robert Rose

== Honour roll ==
NBL Championships:	None
NBL Grand Final appearances:	1 (2001)
NBL Most Valuable Players:	Robert Rose (2001), Corey Williams (2010), Brian Conklin (2015)
All-NBL First Team:	(9) Clarence Tyson (1997), Derek Rucker (1997), Ray Owes (1998), Sam Mackinnon (2000), Robert Rose (2001), Larry Abney (2006), Corey Williams (2010), Brian Conklin (2015)
All-NBL Second Team:	(15) Derek Rucker (1995), Robert Rose (1999, 2002), Andrew Goodwin (2000), Pat Reidy (2003), John Rillie (2005), Larry Abney (2007), Brad Newley (2007), Corey Williams (2008, 2009), Luke Schenscher (2011), Peter Crawford (2012), Brian Conklin (2014), Todd Blanchfield (2015)
All-NBL Third Team:	(8) Clarence Tyson (1995), Sam Mackinnon (1999), Robert Rose (2000, 2003), Wayne Turner (2003), Casey Calvary (2005), Peter Crawford (2011), Eddie Gill (2012)
NBL Coach of the Year:	Ian Stacker (2000, 2003), Trevor Gleeson (2011), Shawn Dennis (2016)
NBL Rookie of the Year:	Brad Newley (2005), Nick Kay (2016)
NBL Most Improved Player:	Andrew Goodwin (2000), Todd Blanchfield (2015), Clint Steindl (2016)
NBL Best Sixth Man:	Ben Knight (2000), Brad Newley (2005)
NBL Good Hands Award:	Derek Rucker (1998)

== Season by season ==
NBL champions	League champions	Runners-up	Finals berth

Season	Tier	League	Regular season					Post-season	Head coach	Captain	Club MVP
Season	Tier	League	Finish	Played	Wins	Losses	Win %	Post-season	Head coach	Captain	Club MVP
Townsville Suns
1993	1	NBL	14th	26	4	22	.154	Did not qualify	Mark Bragg	Graham Kubank	Ricky Jones
1994	1	NBL	13th	26	6	20	.231	Did not qualify	Mark Bragg	Graham Kubank	Darryl Johnson
1995	1	NBL	11th	26	9	17	.346	Did not qualify	Mark Bragg	Derek Rucker	Derek Rucker
1996	1	NBL	11th	26	9	17	.346	Did not qualify	Mark Bragg	Derek Rucker	Clarence Tyson
1997	1	NBL	8th	30	14	16	.467	Did not qualify	Mark Bragg	Derek Rucker	Derek Rucker
1998	1	NBL	9th	30	12	18	.400	Did not qualify	Mark Bragg	Derek Rucker	Derek Rucker
Townsville Crocodiles
1998–99	1	NBL	7th	26	12	14	.462	Did not qualify	Ian Stacker	Robert Rose	Robert Rose
1999–2000	1	NBL	2nd	28	22	6	.786	Lost semifinals (Perth) 1–2	Ian Stacker	Robert Rose	Sam Mackinnon; Robert Rose
2000–01	1	NBL	2nd	28	22	6	.786	Won qualifying finals (Sydney) 2–1; Won semifinals (Victoria) 2–1; Lost NBL finals (Wollongong) 1–2	Ian Stacker	Robert Rose	Robert Rose
2001–02	1	NBL	9th	30	13	17	.433	Did not qualify	Ian Stacker	Robert Rose	Robert Rose
2002–03	1	NBL	3rd	30	19	11	.633	Lost qualifying finals (Wollongong) 0–2; Lost semifinals (Sydney) 1–2	Ian Stacker	Robert Rose	Pat Reidy; Wayne Turner
2003–04	1	NBL	9th	33	13	20	.394	Did not qualify	Ian Stacker	Robert Rose	Pat Reidy
2004–05	1	NBL	3rd	32	19	13	.594	Won quarterfinal (Melbourne) 112–100; Lost semifinals (Wollongong) 0–2	Ian Stacker	Robert Rose	John Rillie
2005–06	1	NBL	10th	32	9	23	.281	Did not qualify	Ian Stacker	John Rillie	Larry Abney
2006–07	1	NBL	5th	33	19	14	.576	Won elimination final (Singapore) 106–93; Lost quarterfinal (Sydney) 89–122	Trevor Gleeson	John Rillie	Larry Abney; John Rillie
2007–08	1	NBL	5th	30	17	13	.567	Won elimination final (Gold Coast) 97–89; Lost quarterfinal (Perth) 78–96	Trevor Gleeson	John Rillie	John Rillie
2008–09	1	NBL	5th	30	17	13	.567	Won elimination final (Perth) 103–96; Lost semifinals (South) 1–2	Trevor Gleeson	John Rillie	Corey Williams
2009–10	1	NBL	3rd	28	16	12	.571	Lost semifinals (Wollongong) 1–2	Trevor Gleeson	Russell Hinder	Corey Williams
2010–11	1	NBL	2nd	28	17	11	.607	Lost semifinals (Cairns) 1–2	Trevor Gleeson	Russell Hinder	Luke Schenscher
2011–12	1	NBL	4th	28	15	13	.536	Lost semifinals (New Zealand) 1–2	Paul Woolpert	Michael Cedar; Russell Hinder	Peter Crawford
2012–13	1	NBL	7th	28	10	18	.357	Did not qualify	Paul Woolpert	Russell Hinder	Gary Ervin
2013–14	1	NBL	8th	28	10	18	.357	Did not qualify	Shawn Dennis	Russell Hinder	Brian Conklin
2014–15	1	NBL	6th	28	11	17	.393	Did not qualify	Shawn Dennis	Brian Conklin	Brian Conklin
2015–16	1	NBL	7th	28	11	17	.393	Did not qualify	Shawn Dennis	Mitch Norton	Jordair Jett
Regular season record				692	326	366	.471	0 regular season champions			
Finals record				37	15	22	.405	0 NBL championships			

As of the end of the 2015–16 season

Source: Townsville Crocodiles Year by Year

== Kevin Sugars Medal (Club MVP) ==
- 1993 Ricky Jones
- 1994 Darryl Johnson
- 1995 Derek Rucker
- 1996 Clarence Tyson
- 1997 Derek Rucker
- 1998 Derek Rucker
- 1999 Robert Rose
- 2000 Sam Mackinnon & Robert Rose
- 2001 Robert Rose
- 2002 Robert Rose
- 2003 Pat Reidy & Wayne Turner
- 2004 Pat Reidy
- 2005 John Rillie
- 2006 Larry Abney
- 2007 Larry Abney & John Rillie
- 2008 John Rillie
- 2009 Corey Williams
- 2010 Corey Williams
- 2011 Luke Schenscher
- 2012 Peter Crawford
- 2013 Gary Ervin
- 2014 Brian Conklin
- 2015 Brian Conklin
- 2016 Jordair Jett

Source: Award Winners

== Notable players ==
- (United States) Larry Abney
- (United States) Will Blalock
- (Australia) Jason Cameron
- (Australia) Chris Cedar
- (United States) Brian Conklin
- (Australia) Peter Crawford
- (United States) Gary Ervin
- (Australia) Russell Hinder
- (Lithuania) Rimas Kurtinaitis
- (United States) / (Australia) Damon Lowery
- (Australia) Luke Nevill
- (United States) Josh Pace
- (Australia) / (Philippines) Mick Pennisi
- (United States) Robert Rose
- (United States) / (Australia) Derek Rucker
- (Australia) Luke Schenscher
- (United States) Wayne Turner
- (United States) / (Jamaica) Corey Williams
