= Shawn Dennis =

Australian basketball coach (born 1965)

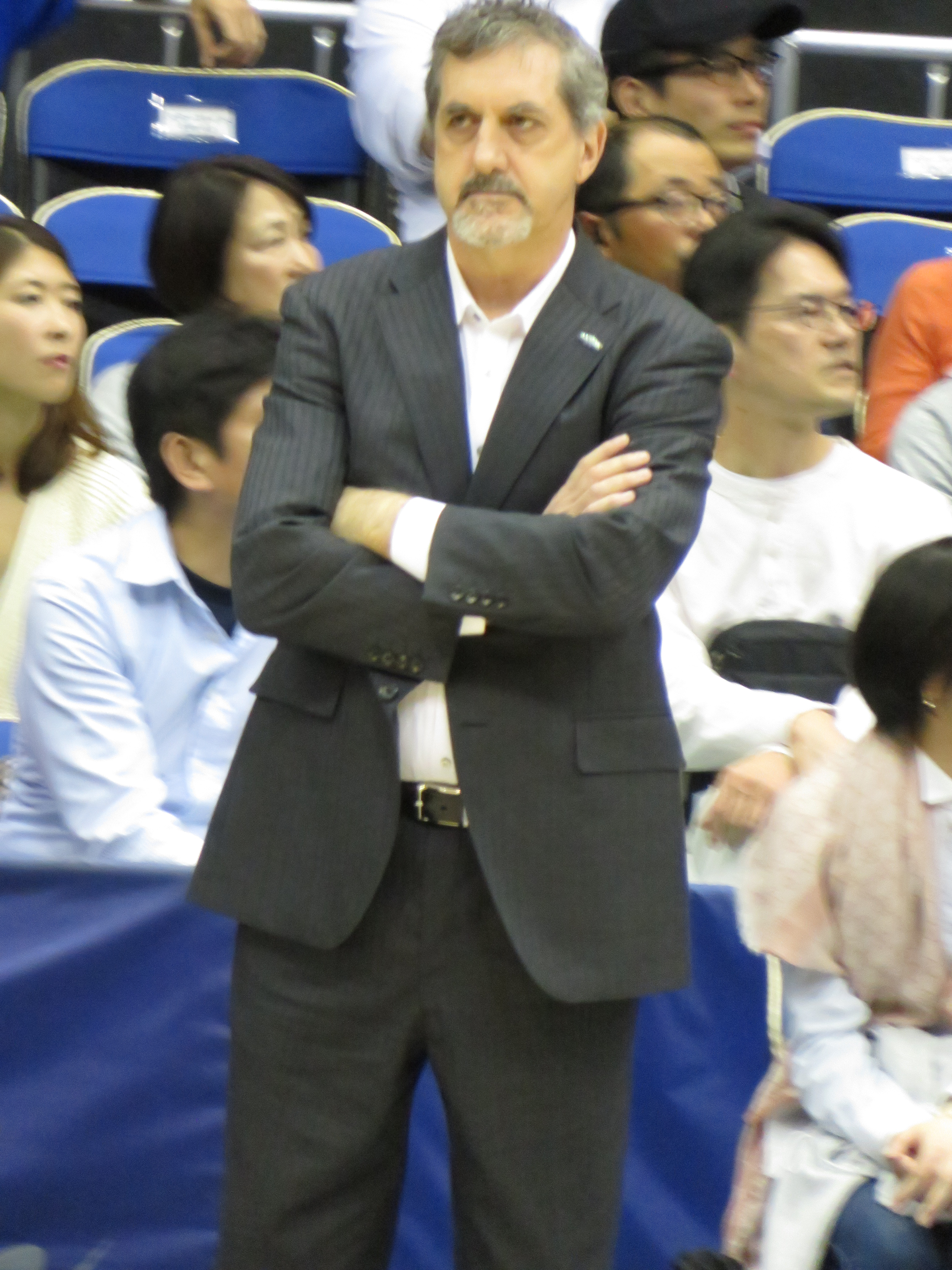
- Dennis in 2018

Tokyo Sunrockers
- Title: Head coach
- League: B.League

Personal information
- Born: 27 October 1965 (age 61) Melbourne, Victoria, Australia
- Listed height: 1.87 m (6 ft 2 in)
- Listed weight: 80 kg (176 lb)

Career information
- Playing career: 1986–1996
- Position: Guard
- Coaching career: 1993–present

Career history

Playing
- 1986–1989: Newcastle Falcons
- 1991: Hobart Tassie Devils
- 1992–1996: Newcastle Falcons

Coaching
- 1993–1996: Newcastle Falcons (assistant)
- 1997–1999: Newcastle Falcons
- 1999–2000: Wollongong Hawks (assistant)
- 2004–2010: Hawke's Bay Hawks
- 2007–2009: West Sydney Razorbacks (assistant)
- 2010–2013: Perth Wildcats (assistant)
- 2013–2016: Townsville Crocodiles
- 2016–2017: Link Tochigi Brex (assistant)
- 2017–2021: Shiga Lakestars
- 2021–2026: Nagoya Diamond Dolphins
- 2026–present: Tokyo Sunrockers

Career highlights
- As head coach: NBL Coach of the Year (2016); NZNBL Coach of the Year (2004)

Shawn Dennis (born 27 October 1965) is an Australian professional basketball coach and former player, who is the head coach for the Tokyo Sunrockers of the Japanese B.League. As a player, he played in the National Basketball League (NBL) for ten years, mainly with the Newcastle Falcons and a brief stint wit the Hobart Tassie Devils.

== Head coaching record ==
Legend
Regular season	G	Games coached	W	Games won	L	Games lost	W–L %	Win–loss %
Playoffs	PG	Playoff games	PW	Playoff wins	PL	Playoff losses	PW–L %	Playoff win–loss %

Team	Year	G	W	L	W–L%	Finish	PG	PW	PL	PW–L%	Result
Shiga Lakestars	2017-18	60	24	36	.400	3rd in Western	-	-	-	–	-
Shiga Lakestars	2018-19	60	18	42	.300	5th in Western	-	-	-	–	-
Shiga Lakestars	2019-20	41	21	20	.512	3rd in Western	-	-	-	–	-
