= Bradley Williamson =

Bradley or Brad Williamson may refer to:

- Brad Williamson (basketball) (born 1981), Australian basketball player
- Brad Williamson (ice hockey) (born 1977), Canadian ice hockey player
- Slim Williamson (Bradley L. Williamson, 1927–2013), owned several records labels
