= Bradley Sheridan =

Australian basketball player

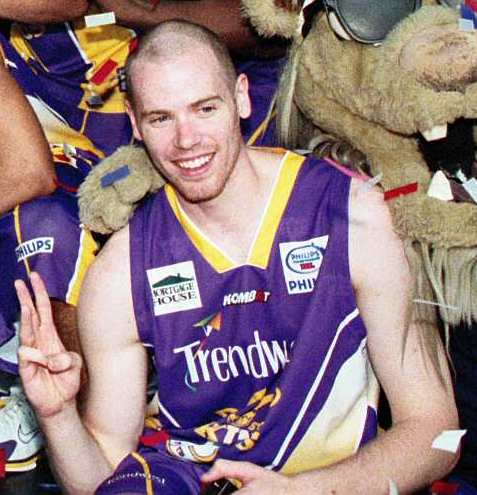
- Sheridan with the Sydney Kings in 2005

Personal information
- Born: 19 February 1980 (age 46) Melbourne, Victoria
- Listed height: 6 ft 6 in (1.98 m)
- Listed weight: 198 lb (90 kg)

Career information
- Playing career: 1999–2009
- Position: Guard / forward

Career history
- 1999–2002: Victoria Titans
- 2003–2007: Sydney Kings
- 2007–2008: Townsville Crocodiles

Career highlights
- 3x NBL champion (2003–2005)

Bradley Michael Sheridan (born 19 February 1980 in Melbourne, Victoria) is an Australian basketball player who used to play in the NBL.

Sheridan joined in Victoria Titans in 1999 after he travelled to the Australian Institute of Sport. At that time (and currently Australia national basketball team coach) Brian Goorjian was coaching the Titans. Sheridan was at the club when they reached the finals in 1999 and 2000. He remained at the club until the club had to be sold and rebranded the Victoria Giants.

He followed Goorjian to the Sydney Kings where he won three consecutive titles from 2003 to 2005. At that time he became the second ever player to have won three consecutive titles and is among 20 other players to have won three NBL championships. He stayed with the club until the 2006/07 NBL season to head north to play for the Townsville Crocodiles.

Sheridan was dropped for the start of the 2008–09 NBL Season and currently has no team.

Sheridan now works as a primary school teacher.
