= Newcastle Falcons (basketball) =

Defunct basketball team from Newcastle, Australia

- Leagues: NBL
- Founded: 1979
- Dissolved: 1999
- History: Newcastle Falcons; 1979–1999
- Arena: Broadmeadow Basketball Stadium (1979–1991); Newcastle Entertainment Centre (1992–1999)
- Capacity: BBS – 2,200; NEC – 4,658
- Location: Newcastle, New South Wales
- Team colors: Red, blue, white
- Championships: 0
Home	Away

The Newcastle Falcons are a defunct basketball team that competed in Australia's National Basketball League (NBL). Based in Newcastle, New South Wales, the team played in the NBL's inaugural season in 1979 but left the league in the late 1990s after new owners based in Albury couldn't resolve the club's ongoing financial problems.

== History ==
The Falcons hold a special place in the history of the NBL with the club largely responsible for the formation of the league which also saw them organise the first season in 1979. The other clubs had to pay a fee of around AU$300 to the Falcons to participate in that first season and the city of Newcastle is regarded as the birthplace of the NBL.

The club's original colours were green and white, being the city's colours, but the club soon changed to black and red, and to red and blue, after the Newcastle Knights' admission to the New South Wales Rugby League in 1988. All the national league clubs in Newcastle took on red and blue as their colours at some stage in their existence.

The club's downfall began in the mid-1990s when problems with sponsor, clothing and sports equipment company Topper befell them and the National Soccer League's Newcastle Breakers. Even with the support of new sponsor EnergyAustralia and new owners, the club couldn't get itself out of trouble, and left the league following the 1998–99 NBL season.

== Home Arenas ==
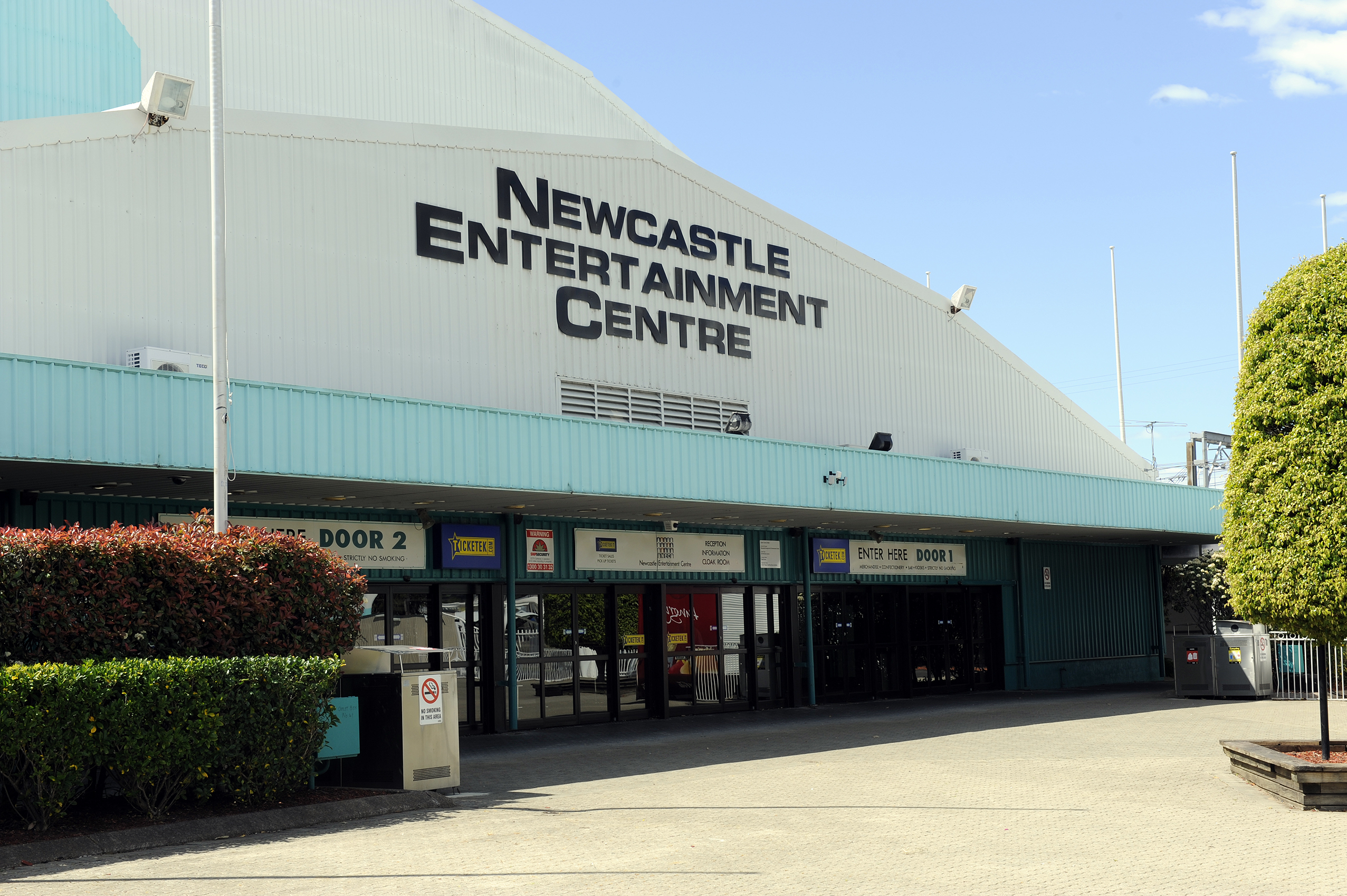
The Newcastle Entertainment Centre, Home of the Falcons from 1992 to 1999

After spending its first 13 seasons playing out of the 2,200 capacity Broadmeadow Basketball Stadium, the Falcons made the move to the new, 4,658 seat Newcastle Entertainment Centre located on the other side of the Newcastle Showgrounds in 1992 where they would remain until the club folded in 1999. Although the Falcons never appeared in an NBL Grand Final, the Broadmeadow Stadium hosted the 1982 NBL Grand Final between the West Adelaide Bearcats and the Geelong Supercats. West Adelaide won the Grand Final 80–74 in front of a capacity crowd.

== Post 1999 ==
The city of Newcastle had no NBL team until the new owners of the Canberra Cannons moved to Newcastle and established the Hunter Pirates in 2003. The Pirates in turn withdrew from the NBL at the end of the 2005–2006 season after their licence was sold to the Singapore Slingers.

In 2011, past Falcons players reunited for a charity exhibition game at the Broadmeadow Basketball Stadium to raise funds for the Cancer Council. Nathan Tinkler's Hunter Sports Group attempted to revive the Falcons NBL team around this time but was ultimately unsuccessful in doing so.

The Falcons name was revived in 2021 when the Newcastle Hunters Waratah League basketball team announced that they would be changing their name to the Newcastle Falcons upon their admission to the NBL1 East competition in 2022.

== Honour roll ==
NBL Championships:	None
NBL Finals Appearances:	6 (1983, 1984, 1985, 1988, 1993, 1995)
NBL Grand Final Appearances:	None
NBL Most Valuable Players:	None
NBL Grand Final MVPs:	None
All-NBL First Team:	Owen Wells (1981), George Morrow (1982,1983), Terry Dozier (1993), Reggie Smith (1995), Ben Melmeth (1998)
All-NBL Second Team:	Wayne McDaniel (1988), Jerry Everett (1989), Butch Hays (1995), David Van Dyke (1996)
All-NBL Third Team:	Terry Dozier (1992), Everette Stephens (1992), Derek Rucker (1994), Butch Hays (1996)
NBL Coach of the Year:	Bob Turner (1981), Tom Wisman (1995)
NBL Rookie of the Year:	Scott McGregor (1996)
NBL Most Improved Player:	Tonny Jensen (1995), Ben Pepper (1997), Ben Melmeth (1998)
NBL Best Defensive Player:	Terry Dozier (1992, 1993)
NBL Best Sixth Man:	Ben Pepper (1997)

== Season by season ==
NBL champions	League champions	Runners-up	Finals berth

Season	Tier	League	Regular season					Post-season	Head coach
Season	Tier	League	Finish	Played	Wins	Losses	Win %	Post-season	Head coach
Newcastle Falcons
1979	1	NBL	6th	18	8	10	.444	Did not qualify	Bob Turner
1980	1	NBL	5th	22	13	9	.591	Did not qualify	Dean Donnollon
1981	1	NBL	6th	22	13	9	.591	Did not qualify	Bob Turner
1982	1	NBL	5th	26	17	9	.654	Did not qualify	Bob Turner
1983	1	NBL	4th	22	13	9	.591	Eliminated round robin 0–3	Denis Kibble
1984	1	NBL	3rd	24	18	6	.750	Won elimination final (Illawarra) 108–101; Lost qualifying final (Coburg) 109–132	Dave Ankeney
1985	1	NBL	6th	26	16	10	.615	Won elimination final (Nunawading) 103–97; Lost semifinal (Adelaide) 103–151	Dave Ankeney
1986	1	NBL	10th	26	10	16	.385	Did not qualify	Stephen Johansen
1987	1	NBL	12th	26	6	20	.231	Did not qualify	Stephen Johansen; Owen Wells
1988	1	NBL	5th	24	13	11	.542	Lost elimination final (Canberra) 92–107	Ken Cole
1989	1	NBL	12th	24	6	18	.250	Did not qualify	Ken Cole
1990	1	NBL	13th	26	4	22	.154	Did not qualify	Ken Cole
1991	1	NBL	14th	26	5	21	.192	Did not qualify	Ken Cole; Thomas Wisman
1992	1	NBL	12th	24	9	15	.375	Did not qualify	Thomas Wisman
1993	1	NBL	5th	26	15	11	.577	Lost quarterfinals (Brisbane) 0–2	Thomas Wisman
1994	1	NBL	9th	26	13	13	.500	Did not qualify	Thomas Wisman
1995	1	NBL	5th	26	17	9	.654	Lost quarterfinals (Adelaide) 1–2	Thomas Wisman
1996	1	NBL	9th	26	11	15	.423	Did not qualify	Thomas Wisman
1997	1	NBL	9th	30	12	18	.400	Did not qualify	Shawn Dennis
1998	1	NBL	11th	30	9	21	.300	Did not qualify	Shawn Dennis
1998–99	1	NBL	10th	26	9	17	.346	Did not qualify	Shawn Dennis
Regular season record				526	237	289	.451	0 regular season champions	
Finals record				13	3	10	.231	0 NBL championships	

As of the end of the 1998–99 season

*Note: In 1983 and 1984, the NBL was split into Eastern and Western divisions during the regular season.
