= Terry Dozier =

American basketball player and coach (born 1966)

Personal information
- Born: June 29, 1966 (age 60) Baltimore, Maryland, U.S.
- Listed height: 6 ft 9 in (2.06 m)
- Listed weight: 210 lb (95 kg)

Career information
- High school: Dunbar (Baltimore, Maryland)
- College: South Carolina (1985–1989)
- NBA draft: 1989: undrafted
- Playing career: 1989–2001
- Position: Small forward
- Number: 23
- Coaching career: 2012–2016

Career history

Playing
- 1989: Charlotte Hornets
- 1989–1990: Quad City Thunder
- 1991: Geelong Supercats
- 1991–1992: Tri-City Chinook
- 1992–1994: Newcastle Falcons
- 1994–1995: Hapoel Galil Elyon
- 2001: Keravnos

Coaching
- 2012–2016: Westwood HS

Career highlights
- All-NBL Third Team (1992); 3× NBL Best Defensive Player (1991–1993); Parade All-American (1985); McDonald's All-American (1985)
- Stats at NBA.com
- Stats at Basketball Reference

Terry Linnard Dozier (born June 29, 1966) is an American former professional basketball player and coach. A McDonald's All-American at Dunbar High School in Baltimore, he played college basketball for the South Carolina Gamecocks from 1985 to 1989 and scored 1,445 career points. Undrafted in the 1989 NBA draft, he signed with the Charlotte Hornets and played nine games in the 1989–90 NBA season before he was waived. He later played in Australia's National Basketball League (NBL), where he was a three-time Best Defensive Player. After his playing career, he worked in the South Carolina athletics department and was the first boys' basketball coach at Westwood High School in Blythewood, South Carolina.

== Early life and high school ==
Dozier was born in Baltimore and played at Dunbar High School with his twin brother, Perry. The two were known as the "Twin Towers" and helped the Poets to a national championship; USA Today named Dunbar's 1984–85 team national champions. As a senior in 1985, Dozier was named a McDonald's All-American and a Parade All-American. Their first official recruiting visit was to South Carolina, arranged as a favor to their high school coach, Bob Wade.

== College career ==
Dozier played four seasons at South Carolina from 1985 to 1989, alongside Perry, in the Metro Conference. As a freshman in 1985–86, under coach Bill Foster, he appeared in 17 games and averaged 13.8 points and 4.9 rebounds. His best scoring season came as a sophomore in 1986–87, when he averaged 17.0 points and 5.4 rebounds in 29 games. Over 104 career games he scored 1,445 points (13.9 per game) and averaged 4.7 rebounds and 1.9 assists. Perry's college career ended after a knee injury in his junior year.

College statistics
Year	Team	GP	GS	MPG	FG%	3P%	FT%	RPG	APG	SPG	BPG	PPG
1985–86	South Carolina	17	16	34.2	.474		.781	4.9	1.3	0.6	0.4	13.8
1986–87	South Carolina	29	28	37.6	.485	.423	.814	5.4	1.7	0.9	0.3	17.0
1987–88	South Carolina	28		32.3	.498	.300	.663	4.3	2.4	0.7	0.1	13.4
1988–89	South Carolina	30		32.2	.447	.300	.759	4.3	2.2	0.8	0.2	11.5
Career		104		34.1	.477	.342	.759	4.7	1.9	0.8	0.3	13.9

== Professional career ==
=== Charlotte Hornets ===
Dozier went undrafted in the 1989 NBA draft. He signed with the Hornets as a free agent on September 28, 1989, made his NBA debut on November 3, and was waived on November 27 after nine games, in which he averaged 2.4 points and 1.7 rebounds in 10.2 minutes per game.

=== Continental Basketball Association ===
Dozier then joined the Quad City Thunder of the Continental Basketball Association (CBA). In 12 regular-season games in 1989–90, he averaged 15.2 points and 7.6 rebounds. In 1991–92 he played 17 games for the Tri-City Chinook of the CBA, averaging 6.6 points and 2.5 rebounds.

=== Australia ===
Dozier played four seasons in the NBL, first with the Geelong Supercats in 1991 and then with the Newcastle Falcons from 1992 to 1994. He was named the league's Best Defensive Player in 1991, 1992, and 1993, one of a small group of players to win the award three times, and earned All-NBL Third Team honors in 1992. In 103 NBL games he averaged 21.8 points, 10.3 rebounds, and 2.1 assists. In August 1993, while playing in Australia, he returned to the United States for the funeral of his cousin, Boston Celtics player Reggie Lewis.

=== Israel and later career ===
Dozier played the 1994–95 season in Israel with Hapoel Galil Elyon, averaging 13.0 points and 5.4 rebounds. He later said he also played in Japan, Italy, Cyprus, and England during a 12-year professional career. In 2001 he appeared in four FIBA Saporta Cup games for Keravnos in Cyprus, averaging 15.0 points and 5.3 rebounds.

== Coaching career ==
After retiring as a player, Dozier joined the South Carolina athletics department as a career-development coordinator for student-athletes. In 2012, when Westwood High School opened in Blythewood, he became the school's first boys' basketball coach. On December 4, 2012, his Redhawks lost 61–38 to Spring Valley High School, coached by his twin brother, Perry, in the brothers' first high school coaching matchup. In four seasons Dozier compiled a 46–46 record, with one playoff appearance in 2014–15 that ended with a first-round loss to James Island. Westwood went 11–11 and finished fifth in Region 4-4A in 2015–16. He was dismissed in March 2016; the school cited administrative paperwork mistakes, a reason Dozier disputed. He remained at the school as an administrative monitor.

== Personal life ==
Dozier is the older of twins, by four minutes, with his brother Perry. He is a cousin of Reggie Lewis and the uncle of professional basketball player PJ Dozier, Perry's son, who has played in the NBA. As of 2018, he was working as a trainer, mentor, and motivational speaker.

== Career statistics ==
Legend
GP	Games played	GS	Games started	MPG	Minutes per game
FG%	Field goal percentage	3P%	3-point field goal percentage	FT%	Free throw percentage
RPG	Rebounds per game	APG	Assists per game	SPG	Steals per game
BPG	Blocks per game	PPG	Points per game	**Bold**	Career high

=== NBA ===
==== Regular season ====
Year	Team	GP	GS	MPG	FG%	3P%	FT%	RPG	APG	SPG	BPG	PPG
1989–90	Charlotte	9	0	10.2	.333	.000	.500	1.7	.3	.7	.2	2.4
