= Clarence Tyson =

American basketball player

Personal information
- Born: March 21, 1970 (age 56) U.S.
- Listed height: 6 ft 7 in (2.01 m)
- Listed weight: 215 lb (98 kg)

Career information
- High school: Booker T. Washington (Shreveport, Louisiana)
- College: Kilgore (1990–1992); Washburn (1992–1994)
- NBA draft: 1994: undrafted
- Playing career: 1995–2001
- Position: Power forward

Career history
- 1995–1999: Townsville Suns / Crocodiles
- 1999: Chester Jets
- 1999–2000: Fargo–Moorhead Beez
- 2000–2001: Melbourne Tigers

Career highlights
- All-NBL First Team (1997); 2× All-NBL Third Team (1995, 1996); MIAA Player of the Year (1994); First-team All-MIAA (1994); Third-team All-TEC (1992)

Clarence Tyson (born March 21, 1970) is an American former professional basketball player. He played college basketball for the Kilgore Rangers and Washburn Ichabods. Tyson was chosen as the Mid-America Intercollegiate Athletics Association (MIAA) Player of the Year with the Ichabods in 1994. He played professionally in the Australian National Basketball League (NBL), the British Basketball League (BBL) and International Basketball Association (IBA). Tyson was a three-time All-NBL Team selection while playing for the Townsville Suns from 1995 to 1997.

== Early life ==
Tyson is from Shreveport, Louisiana, and played basketball at Booker T. Washington High School. He averaged 28.9 points per game during his senior season.

== College career ==
Tyson began his collegiate career at Kilgore College. He played as a reserve during his freshman season and averaged 10.3 points and 6.4 rebounds per game. Tyson missed part of his sophomore season in 1991–92 due to a knee injury. He returned to average 12.5 points and 7.7 rebounds per game which earned him a selection to the All-Texas Eastern Conference (TEC) third-team. Tyson led Kilgore in blocks both seasons he played.

On May 6, 1992, Tyson signed a National Letter of Intent to play for the Washburn Ichabods. He averaged 15.1 points and 8.7 rebounds per game during his two seasons at Washburn. Tyson was selected as the Mid-America Intercollegiate Athletics Association (MIAA) Player of the Year in 1994. He was inducted in the Washburn Athletic Hall of Fame in 2005.

== Professional career ==
Tyson played for the Townsville Suns in the Australian National Basketball League (NBL) and was a three-time All-NBL Team selection from 1995 to 1997. He was appointed as team captain in 1998 when the Suns changed their name to the Crocodiles, but he missed the season because of a knee injury. Tyson was ruled out for a second season because of a knee injury in 1998–99.

On September 8, 1999, Tyson was signed by the Fargo–Moorhead Beez of the International Basketball Association. On October 22, he was signed by the Chester Jets of the British Basketball League to replace Correy Childs. Tyson's debut for the Jets was delayed while he awaited a work permit. He appeared in only two games for the Jets before he was injured and replaced on the roster by James Hamilton in November. That same month, Tyson returned to the Beez and was named on their opening game roster. He was one of three players who spent the entire 1999–2000 season with the Beez.

Tyson played for the Melbourne Tigers of the NBL during the 2000–01 season.
