= 1993 NBL season =

- League: National Basketball League
- Sport: Basketball
- Duration: 16 April – 26 September 1993; 29 September – 17 October 1993 (Finals); 23 – 31 October 1993 (Grand Finals)
- Teams: 14
- TV partner: Network Ten

Regular season
- Season champions: Perth Wildcats
- Season MVP: Robert Rose (South East Melbourne)
- Top scorer: Andrew Gaze (Melbourne)

Finals
- Champions: Melbourne Tigers (1st title)
- Runners-up: Perth Wildcats
- Finals MVP: Ricky Grace (Perth)

NBL seasons
- ← 1992 1994 →

The 1993 NBL season was the 15th season of National Basketball League competition since its establishment in 1979. A total of 14 teams contested the league, It was broadcast on Network Ten at midnight due to low ratings of live coverage until 1997, Townsville Suns made their debut this season.

== Clubs ==
| Club | Location | Home Venue | Capacity | Founded | Head coach |
|---|---|---|---|---|---|
| Adelaide 36ers | Adelaide, South Australia | Clipsal Powerhouse | 8,000 | 1982 | (United States) Don Monson |
| Brisbane Bullets | Brisbane, Queensland | Brisbane Entertainment Centre | 13,500 | 1979 | (United States) Bruce Palmer |
| Canberra Cannons | Canberra, Australian Capital Territory | AIS Arena | 5,200 | 1979 | (Australia) Barry Barnes |
| Geelong Supercats | (Victoria (state)) Geelong, Victoria | Geelong Arena | 2,000 | 1982 | (Australia) Steve Breheny (United States) Jim Calvin |
| Gold Coast Rollers | Gold Coast, Queensland | Carrara Indoor Stadium | 2,992 | 1990 | (Australia) Dave Claxton |
| Hobart Tassie Devils | Hobart, Tasmania | Derwent Entertainment Centre | 5,400 | 1983 | [[Cal Bruton| (United States) Cal Bruton]] (Australia) Bill Tomlinson |
| Illawarra Hawks | Wollongong, New South Wales | Illawarra Basketball Stadium | 2,000 | 1979 | (Australia) Alan Black |
| Melbourne Tigers | (Victoria (state)) Melbourne, Victoria | National Tennis Centre at Flinders Park | 15,400 | 1931 | (Australia) Lindsay Gaze |
| Newcastle Falcons | Newcastle, New South Wales | Newcastle Entertainment Centre | 4,658 | 1979 | (Australia) Thomas Wisman |
| North Melbourne Giants | (Victoria (state)) Melbourne, Victoria | The Glass House | 7,200 | 1980 | (United States) Brett Brown |
| Perth Wildcats | Perth, Western Australia | Perth Entertainment Centre | 8,200 | 1982 | (Australia) Adrian Hurley |
| South East Melbourne Magic | (Victoria (state)) Melbourne, Victoria | National Tennis Centre at Flinders Park | 15,400 | 1992 | (United States) Brian Goorjian |
| Sydney Kings | Sydney, New South Wales | Sydney Entertainment Centre | 12,500 | 1988 | (United States) Bob Turner |
| Townsville Suns | Townsville, Queensland | Townsville Entertainment Centre | 5,257 | 1993 | (Australia) Mark Bragg |

== Regular season ==
The 1993 regular season took place over 23 rounds between 16 April 1993 and 26 September 1993.

=== Round 1 ===
| Date | Home | Score | Away | Venue | Crowd | Boxscore |
|---|---|---|---|---|---|---|
| 16/04/1993 | Melbourne Tigers | 93–97 | Sydney Kings | Melbourne Park | N/A | boxscore |
| 16/04/1993 | Gold Coast Rollers | 81–97 | Perth Wildcats | Carrara Indoor Stadium | N/A | boxscore |
| 17/04/1993 | South East Melbourne Magic | 106–86 | Canberra Cannons | Melbourne Park | N/A | boxscore |
| 17/04/1993 | Geelong Supercats | 113–131 | Hobart Tassie Devils | Geelong Arena | N/A | boxscore |
| 17/04/1993 | Newcastle Falcons | 110–106 | Townsville Suns | Newcastle Entertainment Centre | N/A | boxscore |
| 17/04/1993 | Brisbane Bullets | 96–97 | Illawarra Hawks | Brisbane Entertainment Centre | N/A | boxscore |
| 18/04/1993 | North Melbourne Giants | 105–118 | Adelaide 36ers | Melbourne Sports and Entertainment Centre | N/A | boxscore |

=== Round 2 ===
| Date | Home | Score | Away | Venue | Crowd | Boxscore |
|---|---|---|---|---|---|---|
| 23/04/1993 | Melbourne Tigers | 127–85 | Gold Coast Rollers | Melbourne Park | N/A | boxscore |
| 23/04/1993 | Adelaide 36ers | 77–79 | Perth Wildcats | Adelaide Arena | N/A | boxscore |
| 23/04/1993 | Newcastle Falcons | 103–89 | Hobart Tassie Devils | Newcastle Entertainment Centre | N/A | boxscore |
| 23/04/1993 | Townsville Suns | 95–97 | Canberra Cannons | Townsville Entertainment Centre | N/A | boxscore |
| 24/04/1993 | Sydney Kings | 91–94 | Gold Coast Rollers | Sydney Entertainment Centre | N/A | boxscore |
| 24/04/1993 | South East Melbourne Magic | 80–85 | Perth Wildcats | Melbourne Park | N/A | boxscore |
| 24/04/1993 | Illawarra Hawks | 102–83 | Hobart Tassie Devils | Beaton Park Stadium | N/A | boxscore |
| 24/04/1993 | Brisbane Bullets | 113–101 | Canberra Cannons | Brisbane Entertainment Centre | N/A | boxscore |
| 25/04/1993 | Geelong Supercats | 112–120 | North Melbourne Giants | Geelong Arena | N/A | boxscore |

=== Round 3 ===
| Date | Home | Score | Away | Venue | Crowd | Boxscore |
|---|---|---|---|---|---|---|
| 29/04/1993 | Adelaide 36ers | 86–76 | Newcastle Falcons | Adelaide Arena | N/A | boxscore |
| 30/04/1993 | Hobart Tassie Devils | 109–122 | Brisbane Bullets | Derwent Entertainment Centre | N/A | boxscore |
| 30/04/1993 | Illawarra Hawks | 90–89 | Melbourne Tigers | Beaton Park Stadium | N/A | boxscore |
| 30/04/1993 | Townsville Suns | 96–100 | North Melbourne Giants | Townsville Entertainment Centre | N/A | boxscore |
| 1/05/1993 | Perth Wildcats | 98–116 | Newcastle Falcons | Perth Entertainment Centre | N/A | boxscore |
| 1/05/1993 | South East Melbourne Magic | 107–83 | Brisbane Bullets | Melbourne Park | N/A | boxscore |
| 1/05/1993 | Gold Coast Rollers | 92–90 | North Melbourne Giants | Carrara Indoor Stadium | N/A | boxscore |
| 2/05/1993 | Canberra Cannons | 116–106 | Melbourne Tigers | AIS Arena | N/A | boxscore |

=== Round 4 ===
| Date | Home | Score | Away | Venue | Crowd | Boxscore |
|---|---|---|---|---|---|---|
| 7/05/1993 | Hobart Tassie Devils | 88–99 | Adelaide 36ers | Derwent Entertainment Centre | N/A | boxscore |
| 7/05/1993 | Gold Coast Rollers | 95–94 | Illawarra Hawks | Carrara Indoor Stadium | N/A | boxscore |
| 7/05/1993 | Canberra Cannons | 98–103 | South East Melbourne Magic | AIS Arena | N/A | boxscore |
| 7/05/1993 | North Melbourne Giants | 85–94 | Perth Wildcats | Melbourne Park | N/A | boxscore |
| 8/05/1993 | Newcastle Falcons | 100–75 | Illawarra Hawks | Newcastle Entertainment Centre | N/A | boxscore |
| 8/05/1993 | Brisbane Bullets | 118–103 | Townsville Suns | Brisbane Entertainment Centre | N/A | boxscore |
| 8/05/1993 | Melbourne Tigers | 103–121 | Geelong Supercats | Melbourne Park | N/A | boxscore |
| 9/05/1993 | Sydney Kings | 103–100 | South East Melbourne Magic | Sydney Entertainment Centre | N/A | boxscore |

=== Round 5 ===
| Date | Home | Score | Away | Venue | Crowd | Boxscore |
|---|---|---|---|---|---|---|
| 14/05/1993 | North Melbourne Giants | 117–94 | Hobart Tassie Devils | Melbourne Sports and Entertainment Centre | N/A | boxscore |
| 14/05/1993 | Townsville Suns | 98–89 | Newcastle Falcons | Townsville Entertainment Centre | N/A | boxscore |
| 15/05/1993 | Sydney Kings | 97–98 | Brisbane Bullets | Sydney Entertainment Centre | N/A | boxscore |
| 15/05/1993 | Perth Wildcats | 114–89 | Melbourne Tigers | Perth Entertainment Centre | N/A | boxscore |
| 15/05/1993 | South East Melbourne Magic | 92–75 | Hobart Tassie Devils | Melbourne Park | N/A | boxscore |
| 15/05/1993 | Illawarra Hawks | 109–108 | Geelong Supercats | Beaton Park Stadium | N/A | boxscore |
| 15/05/1993 | Gold Coast Rollers | 98–92 | Newcastle Falcons | Carrara Indoor Stadium | N/A | boxscore |
| 16/05/1993 | Canberra Cannons | 121–88 | Adelaide 36ers | AIS Arena | N/A | boxscore |

=== Round 6 ===
| Date | Home | Score | Away | Venue | Crowd | Boxscore |
|---|---|---|---|---|---|---|
| 21/05/1993 | Adelaide 36ers | 118–87 | Sydney Kings | Adelaide Arena | N/A | boxscore |
| 21/05/1993 | Hobart Tassie Devils | 100–98 | North Melbourne Giants | Derwent Entertainment Centre | N/A | boxscore |
| 21/05/1993 | Townsville Suns | 89–104 | Gold Coast Rollers | Townsville Entertainment Centre | N/A | boxscore |
| 22/05/1993 | Perth Wildcats | 109–94 | Sydney Kings | Perth Entertainment Centre | N/A | boxscore |
| 22/05/1993 | Geelong Supercats | 105–122 | Melbourne Tigers | Geelong Arena | N/A | boxscore |
| 22/05/1993 | Newcastle Falcons | 97–85 | Canberra Cannons | Newcastle Entertainment Centre | N/A | boxscore |
| 23/05/1993 | Brisbane Bullets | 131–108 | Gold Coast Rollers | Brisbane Entertainment Centre | N/A | boxscore |

=== Round 7 ===
| Date | Home | Score | Away | Venue | Crowd | Boxscore |
|---|---|---|---|---|---|---|
| 28/05/1993 | Perth Wildcats | 115–103 | Townsville Suns | Perth Entertainment Centre | N/A | boxscore |
| 28/05/1993 | North Melbourne Giants | 114–77 | Sydney Kings | Melbourne Sports and Entertainment Centre | N/A | boxscore |
| 28/05/1993 | Geelong Supercats | 112–109 | Adelaide 36ers | Geelong Arena | N/A | boxscore |
| 28/05/1993 | Gold Coast Rollers | 87–104 | South East Melbourne Magic | Carrara Indoor Stadium | N/A | boxscore |
| 29/05/1993 | Illawarra Hawks | 103–96 | Canberra Cannons | Beaton Park Stadium | N/A | boxscore |
| 29/05/1993 | Melbourne Tigers | 116–108 | Townsville Suns | Melbourne Park | N/A | boxscore |
| 30/05/1993 | Newcastle Falcons | 90–111 | South East Melbourne Magic | Newcastle Entertainment Centre | N/A | boxscore |

=== Round 8 ===
| Date | Home | Score | Away | Venue | Crowd | Boxscore |
|---|---|---|---|---|---|---|
| 4/06/1993 | Hobart Tassie Devils | 86–98 | Melbourne Tigers | Derwent Entertainment Centre | N/A | boxscore |
| 4/06/1993 | Illawarra Hawks | 84–105 | North Melbourne Giants | Beaton Park Stadium | N/A | boxscore |
| 4/06/1993 | Townsville Suns | 121–111 | Geelong Supercats | Townsville Entertainment Centre | N/A | boxscore |
| 5/06/1993 | Sydney Kings | 95–100 | Newcastle Falcons | Sydney Entertainment Centre | N/A | boxscore |
| 5/06/1993 | Adelaide 36ers | 85–97 | Brisbane Bullets | Adelaide Arena | N/A | boxscore |
| 5/06/1993 | Canberra Cannons | 94–81 | North Melbourne Giants | AIS Arena | N/A | boxscore |
| 5/06/1993 | Gold Coast Rollers | 111–85 | Geelong Supercats | Carrara Indoor Stadium | N/A | boxscore |
| 6/06/1993 | South East Melbourne Magic | 113–102 | Melbourne Tigers | Melbourne Park | N/A | boxscore |

=== Round 9 ===
| Date | Home | Score | Away | Venue | Crowd | Boxscore |
|---|---|---|---|---|---|---|
| 11/06/1993 | Melbourne Tigers | 101–96 | Canberra Cannons | Melbourne Park | N/A | boxscore |
| 11/06/1993 | Townsville Suns | 97–109 | Hobart Tassie Devils | Townsville Entertainment Centre | N/A | boxscore |
| 12/06/1993 | Brisbane Bullets | 110–81 | Hobart Tassie Devils | Brisbane Entertainment Centre | N/A | boxscore |
| 12/06/1993 | Sydney Kings | 95–99 | Canberra Cannons | Sydney Entertainment Centre | N/A | boxscore |
| 12/06/1993 | Adelaide 36ers | 98–83 | Gold Coast Rollers | Adelaide Arena | N/A | boxscore |
| 12/06/1993 | Geelong Supercats | 100–109 | Newcastle Falcons | Geelong Arena | N/A | boxscore |
| 13/06/1993 | Illawarra Hawks | 94–89 | Perth Wildcats | Beaton Park Stadium | N/A | boxscore |

=== Round 10 ===
| Date | Home | Score | Away | Venue | Crowd | Boxscore |
|---|---|---|---|---|---|---|
| 18/06/1993 | Melbourne Tigers | 114–92 | Adelaide 36ers | Melbourne Park | N/A | boxscore |
| 18/06/1993 | Hobart Tassie Devils | 91–107 | South East Melbourne Magic | Derwent Entertainment Centre | N/A | boxscore |
| 18/06/1993 | Geelong Supercats | 86–91 | Illawarra Hawks | Geelong Arena | N/A | boxscore |
| 19/06/1993 | North Melbourne Giants | 95–87 | South East Melbourne Magic | Melbourne Park | N/A | boxscore |
| 19/06/1993 | Canberra Cannons | 101–95 | Illawarra Hawks | AIS Arena | N/A | boxscore |
| 19/06/1993 | Brisbane Bullets | 94–87 | Sydney Kings | Brisbane Entertainment Centre | N/A | boxscore |
| 20/06/1993 | Perth Wildcats | 95–91 | Adelaide 36ers | Perth Entertainment Centre | N/A | boxscore |
| 20/06/1993 | Gold Coast Rollers | 127–105 | Townsville Suns | Carrara Indoor Stadium | N/A | boxscore |

=== Round 11 ===
| Date | Home | Score | Away | Venue | Crowd | Boxscore |
|---|---|---|---|---|---|---|
| 25/06/1993 | Adelaide 36ers | 103–105 | Townsville Suns | Adelaide Arena | N/A | boxscore |
| 25/06/1993 | North Melbourne Giants | 108–86 | Brisbane Bullets | Melbourne Park | N/A | boxscore |
| 25/06/1993 | Hobart Tassie Devils | 92–99 | Canberra Cannons | Derwent Entertainment Centre | N/A | boxscore |
| 25/06/1993 | Geelong Supercats | 112–129 | Perth Wildcats | Geelong Arena | N/A | boxscore |
| 26/06/1993 | Melbourne Tigers | 106–99 | Brisbane Bullets | Melbourne Park | N/A | boxscore |
| 26/06/1993 | Sydney Kings | 104–96 | Townsville Suns | Sydney Entertainment Centre | N/A | boxscore |
| 26/06/1993 | Newcastle Falcons | 91–114 | Perth Wildcats | Newcastle Entertainment Centre | N/A | boxscore |
| 27/06/1993 | South East Melbourne Magic | 111–90 | Illawarra Hawks | Melbourne Park | N/A | boxscore |

=== Round 12 ===
| Date | Home | Score | Away | Venue | Crowd | Boxscore |
|---|---|---|---|---|---|---|
| 2/07/1993 | North Melbourne Giants | 103–112 | Melbourne Tigers | Melbourne Park | N/A | boxscore |
| 3/07/1993 | South East Melbourne Magic | 115–87 | Sydney Kings | Melbourne Park | N/A | boxscore |
| 3/07/1993 | Canberra Cannons | 121–99 | Geelong Supercats | AIS Arena | N/A | boxscore |
| 3/07/1993 | Townsville Suns | 73–90 | Illawarra Hawks | Townsville Entertainment Centre | N/A | boxscore |
| 3/07/1993 | Brisbane Bullets | 89–93 | Newcastle Falcons | Brisbane Entertainment Centre | N/A | boxscore |
| 3/07/1993 | Perth Wildcats | 112–100 | Gold Coast Rollers | Perth Entertainment Centre | N/A | boxscore |
| 4/07/1993 | Adelaide 36ers | 109–94 | Melbourne Tigers | Adelaide Arena | N/A | boxscore |

=== Round 13 ===
| Date | Home | Score | Away | Venue | Crowd | Boxscore |
|---|---|---|---|---|---|---|
| 9/07/1993 | Hobart Tassie Devils | 102–103 | Sydney Kings | Derwent Entertainment Centre | N/A | boxscore |
| 9/07/1993 | Geelong Supercats | 106–138 | South East Melbourne Magic | Geelong Arena | N/A | boxscore |
| 9/07/1993 | North Melbourne Giants | 118–101 | Gold Coast Rollers | Melbourne Sports and Entertainment Centre | N/A | boxscore |
| 9/07/1993 | Newcastle Falcons | 101–125 | Melbourne Tigers | Newcastle Entertainment Centre | N/A | boxscore |
| 10/07/1993 | Canberra Cannons | 106–108 | Perth Wildcats | AIS Arena | N/A | boxscore |
| 10/07/1993 | Townsville Suns | 92–117 | Adelaide 36ers | Townsville Entertainment Centre | N/A | boxscore |
| 11/07/1993 | Illawarra Hawks | 98–102 | Sydney Kings | Beaton Park Stadium | N/A | boxscore |
| 13/07/1993 | South East Melbourne Magic | 112–92 | North Melbourne Giants | Melbourne Park | N/A | boxscore |

=== Round 14 ===
| Date | Home | Score | Away | Venue | Crowd | Boxscore |
|---|---|---|---|---|---|---|
| 23/07/1993 | Perth Wildcats | 103–100 | Hobart Tassie Devils | Perth Entertainment Centre | N/A | boxscore |
| 23/07/1993 | North Melbourne Giants | 129–94 | Geelong Supercats | Melbourne Sports and Entertainment Centre | N/A | boxscore |
| 23/07/1993 | Illawarra Hawks | 117–93 | Townsville Suns | Beaton Park Stadium | N/A | boxscore |
| 24/07/1993 | Sydney Kings | 92–95 | Geelong Supercats | Sydney Entertainment Centre | N/A | boxscore |
| 24/07/1993 | South East Melbourne Magic | 91–81 | Adelaide 36ers | Melbourne Park | N/A | boxscore |
| 24/07/1993 | Canberra Cannons | 98–92 | Gold Coast Rollers | AIS Arena | N/A | boxscore |
| 24/07/1993 | Newcastle Falcons | 79–101 | Brisbane Bullets | Newcastle Entertainment Centre | N/A | boxscore |
| 25/07/1993 | Melbourne Tigers | 114–93 | Hobart Tassie Devils | Melbourne Park | N/A | boxscore |

=== Round 15 ===
| Date | Home | Score | Away | Venue | Crowd | Boxscore |
|---|---|---|---|---|---|---|
| 30/07/1993 | Perth Wildcats | 111–99 | North Melbourne Giants | Perth Entertainment Centre | N/A | boxscore |
| 30/07/1993 | Hobart Tassie Devils | 106–101 | Geelong Supercats | Derwent Entertainment Centre | N/A | boxscore |
| 30/07/1993 | Townsville Suns | 103–107 | Brisbane Bullets | Townsville Entertainment Centre | N/A | boxscore |
| 31/07/1993 | Sydney Kings | 119–113 | Melbourne Tigers | Sydney Entertainment Centre | N/A | boxscore |
| 31/07/1993 | Adelaide 36ers | 106–105 | North Melbourne Giants | Adelaide Arena | N/A | boxscore |
| 31/07/1993 | South East Melbourne Magic | 95–82 | Geelong Supercats | Melbourne Park | N/A | boxscore |
| 31/07/1993 | Canberra Cannons | 118–115 | Newcastle Falcons | AIS Arena | N/A | boxscore |
| 1/08/1993 | Gold Coast Rollers | 95–97 | Brisbane Bullets | Carrara Indoor Stadium | N/A | boxscore |

=== Round 16 ===
| Date | Home | Score | Away | Venue | Crowd | Boxscore |
|---|---|---|---|---|---|---|
| 6/08/1993 | Townsville Suns | 94–106 | Perth Wildcats | Townsville Entertainment Centre | N/A | boxscore |
| 6/08/1993 | Newcastle Falcons | 118–93 | Geelong Supercats | Newcastle Entertainment Centre | N/A | boxscore |
| 6/08/1993 | Gold Coast Rollers | 87–82 | Canberra Cannons | Carrara Indoor Stadium | N/A | boxscore |
| 7/08/1993 | Sydney Kings | 123–109 | Hobart Tassie Devils | Sydney Entertainment Centre | N/A | boxscore |
| 7/08/1993 | Illawarra Hawks | 93–107 | South East Melbourne Magic | Beaton Park Stadium | N/A | boxscore |
| 7/08/1993 | Brisbane Bullets | 126–97 | Perth Wildcats | Brisbane Entertainment Centre | N/A | boxscore |
| 8/08/1993 | Adelaide 36ers | 102–97 | Canberra Cannons | Adelaide Arena | N/A | boxscore |

=== Round 17 ===
| Date | Home | Score | Away | Venue | Crowd | Boxscore |
|---|---|---|---|---|---|---|
| 13/08/1993 | Melbourne Tigers | 102–101 | South East Melbourne Magic | Melbourne Park | N/A | boxscore |
| 13/08/1993 | Hobart Tassie Devils | 83–102 | Illawarra Hawks | Derwent Entertainment Centre | N/A | boxscore |
| 13/08/1993 | Geelong Supercats | 124–125 | Townsville Suns | Geelong Arena | N/A | boxscore |
| 13/08/1993 | Gold Coast Rollers | 109–79 | Sydney Kings | Carrara Indoor Stadium | N/A | boxscore |
| 14/08/1993 | Perth Wildcats | 105–92 | South East Melbourne Magic | Perth Entertainment Centre | N/A | boxscore |
| 14/08/1993 | North Melbourne Giants | 86–87 | Illawarra Hawks | Melbourne Sports and Entertainment Centre | N/A | boxscore |
| 14/08/1993 | Canberra Cannons | 133–108 | Townsville Suns | AIS Arena | N/A | boxscore |
| 14/08/1993 | Brisbane Bullets | 109–93 | Adelaide 36ers | Brisbane Entertainment Centre | N/A | boxscore |
| 15/08/1993 | Newcastle Falcons | 113–102 | Sydney Kings | Newcastle Entertainment Centre | N/A | boxscore |

=== Round 18 ===
| Date | Home | Score | Away | Venue | Crowd | Boxscore |
|---|---|---|---|---|---|---|
| 20/08/1993 | Melbourne Tigers | 102–94 | Newcastle Falcons | Melbourne Park | N/A | boxscore |
| 20/08/1993 | Perth Wildcats | 93–77 | Canberra Cannons | Perth Entertainment Centre | N/A | boxscore |
| 20/08/1993 | Adelaide 36ers | 84–76 | Illawarra Hawks | Adelaide Arena | N/A | boxscore |
| 20/08/1993 | Hobart Tassie Devils | 78–95 | Gold Coast Rollers | Derwent Entertainment Centre | N/A | boxscore |
| 21/08/1993 | Sydney Kings | 79–78 | Illawarra Hawks | Sydney Entertainment Centre | N/A | boxscore |
| 21/08/1993 | South East Melbourne Magic | 98–70 | Gold Coast Rollers | Melbourne Park | N/A | boxscore |
| 21/08/1993 | Brisbane Bullets | 92–88 | Geelong Supercats | Brisbane Entertainment Centre | N/A | boxscore |
| 22/08/1993 | North Melbourne Giants | 79–94 | Newcastle Falcons | Melbourne Sports and Entertainment Centre | N/A | boxscore |

=== Round 19 ===
| Date | Home | Score | Away | Venue | Crowd | Boxscore |
|---|---|---|---|---|---|---|
| 27/08/1993 | Geelong Supercats | 98–92 | Canberra Cannons | Geelong Arena | N/A | boxscore |
| 27/08/1993 | Newcastle Falcons | 70–68 | Gold Coast Rollers | Newcastle Entertainment Centre | N/A | boxscore |
| 28/08/1993 | Adelaide 36ers | 92–75 | Hobart Tassie Devils | Adelaide Arena | N/A | boxscore |
| 28/08/1993 | Illawarra Hawks | 102–99 | Gold Coast Rollers | Beaton Park Stadium | N/A | boxscore |
| 28/08/1993 | Townsville Suns | 95–115 | South East Melbourne Magic | Townsville Entertainment Centre | N/A | boxscore |
| 28/08/1993 | Brisbane Bullets | 99–107 | North Melbourne Giants | Brisbane Entertainment Centre | N/A | boxscore |
| 29/08/1993 | Sydney Kings | 101–94 | Perth Wildcats | Sydney Entertainment Centre | N/A | boxscore |
| 30/08/1993 | Melbourne Tigers | 109–96 | Perth Wildcats | Melbourne Park | N/A | boxscore |

=== Round 20 ===
| Date | Home | Score | Away | Venue | Crowd | Boxscore |
|---|---|---|---|---|---|---|
| 3/09/1993 | Perth Wildcats | 114–98 | Geelong Supercats | Perth Entertainment Centre | N/A | boxscore |
| 3/09/1993 | Hobart Tassie Devils | 88–96 | Newcastle Falcons | Derwent Entertainment Centre | N/A | boxscore |
| 3/09/1993 | Illawarra Hawks | 102–94 | Brisbane Bullets | Beaton Park Stadium | N/A | boxscore |
| 3/09/1993 | Townsville Suns | 111–126 | Melbourne Tigers | Townsville Entertainment Centre | N/A | boxscore |
| 4/09/1993 | Sydney Kings | 105–92 | North Melbourne Giants | Sydney Entertainment Centre | N/A | boxscore |
| 4/09/1993 | Adelaide 36ers | 103–92 | Geelong Supercats | Adelaide Arena | N/A | boxscore |
| 4/09/1993 | Canberra Cannons | 106–109 | Brisbane Bullets | AIS Arena | N/A | boxscore |
| 4/09/1993 | Gold Coast Rollers | 110–107 | Melbourne Tigers | Carrara Indoor Stadium | N/A | boxscore |
| 5/09/1993 | South East Melbourne Magic | 114–92 | Newcastle Falcons | Melbourne Park | N/A | boxscore |

=== Round 21 ===
| Date | Home | Score | Away | Venue | Crowd | Boxscore |
|---|---|---|---|---|---|---|
| 10/09/1993 | Perth Wildcats | 120–83 | Illawarra Hawks | Perth Entertainment Centre | N/A | boxscore |
| 10/09/1993 | North Melbourne Giants | 128–92 | Townsville Suns | Melbourne Sports and Entertainment Centre | N/A | boxscore |
| 10/09/1993 | Gold Coast Rollers | 108–113 | Adelaide 36ers | Carrara Indoor Stadium | N/A | boxscore |
| 10/09/1993 | Canberra Cannons | 100–97 | Sydney Kings | AIS Arena | N/A | boxscore |
| 11/09/1993 | Melbourne Tigers | 107–105 | Illawarra Hawks | Melbourne Park | N/A | boxscore |
| 11/09/1993 | Hobart Tassie Devils | 145–112 | Townsville Suns | Derwent Entertainment Centre | N/A | boxscore |
| 11/09/1993 | Newcastle Falcons | 80–79 | Adelaide 36ers | Newcastle Entertainment Centre | N/A | boxscore |
| 11/09/1993 | Brisbane Bullets | 85–82 | South East Melbourne Magic | Brisbane Entertainment Centre | N/A | boxscore |
| 12/09/1993 | Geelong Supercats | 126–115 | Sydney Kings | Geelong Arena | N/A | boxscore |

=== Round 22 ===
| Date | Home | Score | Away | Venue | Crowd | Boxscore |
|---|---|---|---|---|---|---|
| 15/09/1993 | North Melbourne Giants | 113–92 | Canberra Cannons | Melbourne Sports and Entertainment Centre | N/A | boxscore |
| 17/09/1993 | Hobart Tassie Devils | 99–127 | Perth Wildcats | Derwent Entertainment Centre | N/A | boxscore |
| 17/09/1993 | Geelong Supercats | 113–108 | Gold Coast Rollers | Geelong Arena | N/A | boxscore |
| 18/09/1993 | Adelaide 36ers | 84–86 | South East Melbourne Magic | Adelaide Arena | N/A | boxscore |
| 18/09/1993 | Illawarra Hawks | 103–87 | Newcastle Falcons | Beaton Park Stadium | N/A | boxscore |
| 18/09/1993 | Townsville Suns | 97–102 | Sydney Kings | Townsville Entertainment Centre | N/A | boxscore |
| 19/09/1993 | Brisbane Bullets | 112–114 | Melbourne Tigers | Brisbane Entertainment Centre | N/A | boxscore |

=== Round 23 ===
| Date | Home | Score | Away | Venue | Crowd | Boxscore |
|---|---|---|---|---|---|---|
| 22/09/1993 | Melbourne Tigers | 91–92 | North Melbourne Giants | Melbourne Park | N/A | boxscore |
| 23/09/1993 | South East Melbourne Magic | 120–106 | Townsville Suns | Melbourne Park | N/A | boxscore |
| 24/09/1993 | Geelong Supercats | 118–115 | Brisbane Bullets | Geelong Arena | N/A | boxscore |
| 24/09/1993 | Canberra Cannons | 93–112 | Hobart Tassie Devils | AIS Arena | N/A | boxscore |
| 24/09/1993 | Illawarra Hawks | 92–89 | Adelaide 36ers | Beaton Park Stadium | N/A | boxscore |
| 25/09/1993 | Sydney Kings | 90–100 | Adelaide 36ers | Sydney Entertainment Centre | N/A | boxscore |
| 25/09/1993 | Perth Wildcats | 105–102 | Brisbane Bullets | Perth Entertainment Centre | N/A | boxscore |
| 25/09/1993 | Newcastle Falcons | 97–92 | North Melbourne Giants | Newcastle Entertainment Centre | N/A | boxscore |
| 25/09/1993 | Gold Coast Rollers | 118–89 | Hobart Tassie Devils | Carrara Indoor Stadium | N/A | boxscore |

== Ladder ==
| Pos | 1993 NBL season | | | | | | | | | | | |
| Pos | Team | Pld | W | L | PCT | Last 5 | Streak | Home | Away | PF | PA | PP |
|---|---|---|---|---|---|---|---|---|---|---|---|---|
| 1 | Perth Wildcats | 26 | 21 | 5 | 80.77% | 4–1 | W4 | 12–1 | 9–4 | 2709 | 2499 | 108.40% |
| 2 | S.E. Melbourne Magic | 26 | 20 | 6 | 76.92% | 4–1 | W2 | 12–1 | 8–5 | 2687 | 2365 | 113.62% |
| 3 | Melbourne Tigers^{1} | 26 | 16 | 10 | 61.54% | 3–2 | L1 | 10–3 | 6–7 | 2782 | 2668 | 104.27% |
| 4 | Brisbane Bullets^{1} | 26 | 16 | 10 | 61.54% | 2–3 | L3 | 9–4 | 7–6 | 2684 | 2571 | 104.40% |
| 5 | Newcastle Falcons^{2} | 26 | 15 | 11 | 57.69% | 3–2 | W1 | 9–4 | 6–7 | 2502 | 2508 | 99.76% |
| 6 | Illawarra Hawks^{2} | 26 | 15 | 11 | 57.69% | 3–2 | W2 | 10–3 | 5–8 | 2452 | 2462 | 99.59% |
| 7 | Adelaide 36ers | 26 | 14 | 12 | 53.85% | 2–3 | W1 | 9–4 | 5–8 | 2516 | 2449 | 102.74% |
| 8 | North Melbourne Giants | 26 | 13 | 13 | 50.00% | 3–2 | L1 | 8–5 | 5–8 | 2653 | 2527 | 104.99% |
| 9 | Canberra Cannons^{3} | 26 | 12 | 14 | 46.15% | 1–4 | L2 | 9–4 | 3–10 | 2604 | 2608 | 99.85% |
| 10 | Gold Coast Rollers^{3} | 26 | 12 | 14 | 46.15% | 2–3 | W1 | 9–4 | 3–10 | 2525 | 2559 | 98.67% |
| 11 | Sydney Kings | 26 | 11 | 15 | 42.31% | 2–3 | L1 | 7–6 | 4–9 | 2523 | 2656 | 94.99% |
| 12 | Geelong Supercats | 26 | 7 | 19 | 26.92% | 3–2 | W3 | 5–8 | 2–11 | 2692 | 2918 | 92.25% |
| 13 | Hobart Tassie Devils | 26 | 6 | 20 | 23.08% | 2–3 | L1 | 3–10 | 3–10 | 2507 | 2736 | 91.63% |
| 14 | Townsville Suns | 26 | 4 | 22 | 15.38% | 0–5 | L7 | 2–11 | 2–11 | 2623 | 2933 | 89.43% |

Updated to match(es) played on 25 September 1993. Source: NBL.com.au

The NBL tie-breaker system as outlined in the NBL Rules and Regulations states that in the case of an identical win–loss record, the results in games played between the teams will determine order of seeding.

^{1}Melbourne Tigers won Head-to-Head (2-0).

^{2}Head-to-Head between Illawarra Hawks and Newcastle Falcons (1-1). Illawarra Hawks won For and Against (+9).

^{3}Head-to-Head between Canberra Cannons and Gold Coast Rollers (1-1). Canberra Cannons won For and Against (+2).

== Finals ==
=== Playoff bracket ===
Quarterfinals
1 | Perth Wildcats | 101 | 108 | 117
8 | North Melbourne Giants | 105 | 98 | 104
4 | Brisbane Bullets | 125 | 122 | X
5 | Newcastle Falcons | 99 | 118 | X
3 | Melbourne Tigers | 107 | 108 | X
6 | Illawarra Hawks | 95 | 98 | X
2 | S.E. Melbourne Magic | 99 | 102 | X
7 | Adelaide 36ers | 93 | 87 | X

Semifinals
1 | Perth Wildcats | 97 | 120 | 119
4 | Brisbane Bullets | 101 | 107 | 80
2 | S.E. Melbourne Magic | 106 | 72 | X
3 | Melbourne Tigers | 108 | 89 | X

Grand Final
1 | Perth Wildcats | 113 | 112 | 102
3 | Melbourne Tigers | 117 | 105 | 104

=== Quarter-finals ===
| Date | Home | Score | Away | Venue | Crowd | Boxscore |
|---|---|---|---|---|---|---|
| 29/09/1993 | North Melbourne Giants | 105–101 | Perth Wildcats | Melbourne Sports and Entertainment Centre | N/A | boxscore |
| 29/09/1993 | Adelaide 36ers | 93–99 | South East Melbourne Magic | Adelaide Arena | N/A | boxscore |
| 29/09/1993 | Illawarra Hawks | 95–107 | Melbourne Tigers | Beaton Park Stadium | N/A | boxscore |
| 29/09/1993 | Newcastle Falcons | 99–125 | Brisbane Bullets | Newcastle Entertainment Centre | N/A | boxscore |
| 1/10/1993 | Perth Wildcats | 108–98 | North Melbourne Giants | Perth Entertainment Centre | N/A | boxscore |
| 1/10/1993 | South East Melbourne Magic | 102–87 | Adelaide 36ers | Melbourne Park | N/A | boxscore |
| 1/10/1993 | Brisbane Bullets | 122–118 | Newcastle Falcons | Brisbane Entertainment Centre | N/A | boxscore |
| 2/10/1993 | Melbourne Tigers | 108–98 | Illawarra Hawks | Melbourne Park | N/A | boxscore |
| 3/10/1993 | Perth Wildcats | 117–104 | North Melbourne Giants | Perth Entertainment Centre | N/A | boxscore |

=== Semi-finals ===
| Date | Home | Score | Away | Venue | Crowd | Boxscore |
|---|---|---|---|---|---|---|
| 10/10/1993 | Brisbane Bullets | 101–97 | Perth Wildcats | Brisbane Entertainment Centre | N/A | boxscore |
| 11/10/1993 | Melbourne Tigers | 108–106 | South East Melbourne Magic | Melbourne Park | N/A | boxscore |
| 15/10/1993 | Perth Wildcats | 120–107 | Brisbane Bullets | Perth Entertainment Centre | N/A | boxscore |
| 15/10/1993 | South East Melbourne Magic | 72–89 | Melbourne Tigers | Melbourne Park | N/A | boxscore |
| 17/10/1993 | Perth Wildcats | 119–80 | Brisbane Bullets | Perth Entertainment Centre | N/A | boxscore |

=== Grand Final ===
| Date | Home | Score | Away | Venue | Crowd | Boxscore |
|---|---|---|---|---|---|---|
| 23/10/1993 | Melbourne Tigers | 117–113 | Perth Wildcats | Melbourne Park | 15,028 | boxscore |
| 29/10/1993 | Perth Wildcats | 112–105 | Melbourne Tigers | Perth Entertainment Centre | N/A | boxscore |
| 31/10/1993 | Perth Wildcats | 102–104 | Melbourne Tigers | Perth Entertainment Centre | N/A | boxscore |

== 1993 NBL statistics leaders ==
| Category | Player | Team | Stat |
|---|---|---|---|
| Points per game | Andrew Gaze | Melbourne Tigers | 32.0 |
| Rebounds per game | Mark Davis | Adelaide 36ers | 12.9 |
| Assists per game | Andre Lafleur | Gold Coast Rollers | 9.1 |
| Steals per game | Robert Rose | South East Melbourne Magic | 3.0 |
| Blocks per game | Ricky Jones | Townsville Suns | 2.2 |
| Free throw percentage | David Colbert | Brisbane Bullets | 93.3% |

== NBL awards ==
- Most Valuable Player: Robert Rose, South East Melbourne Magic
- Most Valuable Player Grand Final: Ricky Grace, Perth Wildcats
- Best Defensive Player: Terry Dozier, Newcastle Falcons
- Most Improved Player: Scott Ninnis, Adelaide 36ers
- Rookie of the Year: Chris Blakemore, Adelaide 36ers
- Coach of the Year: Alan Black, Illawarra Hawks

== All NBL Team ==
| # | Player | Team |
|---|---|---|
| PG | Robert Rose | South East Melbourne Magic |
| SG | Andrew Gaze | Melbourne Tigers |
| SF | Leroy Loggins | Brisbane Bullets |
| PF | Melvin Thomas | Illawarra Hawks |
| C | Terry Dozier | Newcastle Falcons |
