= Perth Entertainment Centre =

Former indoor arena in Perth, Western Australia

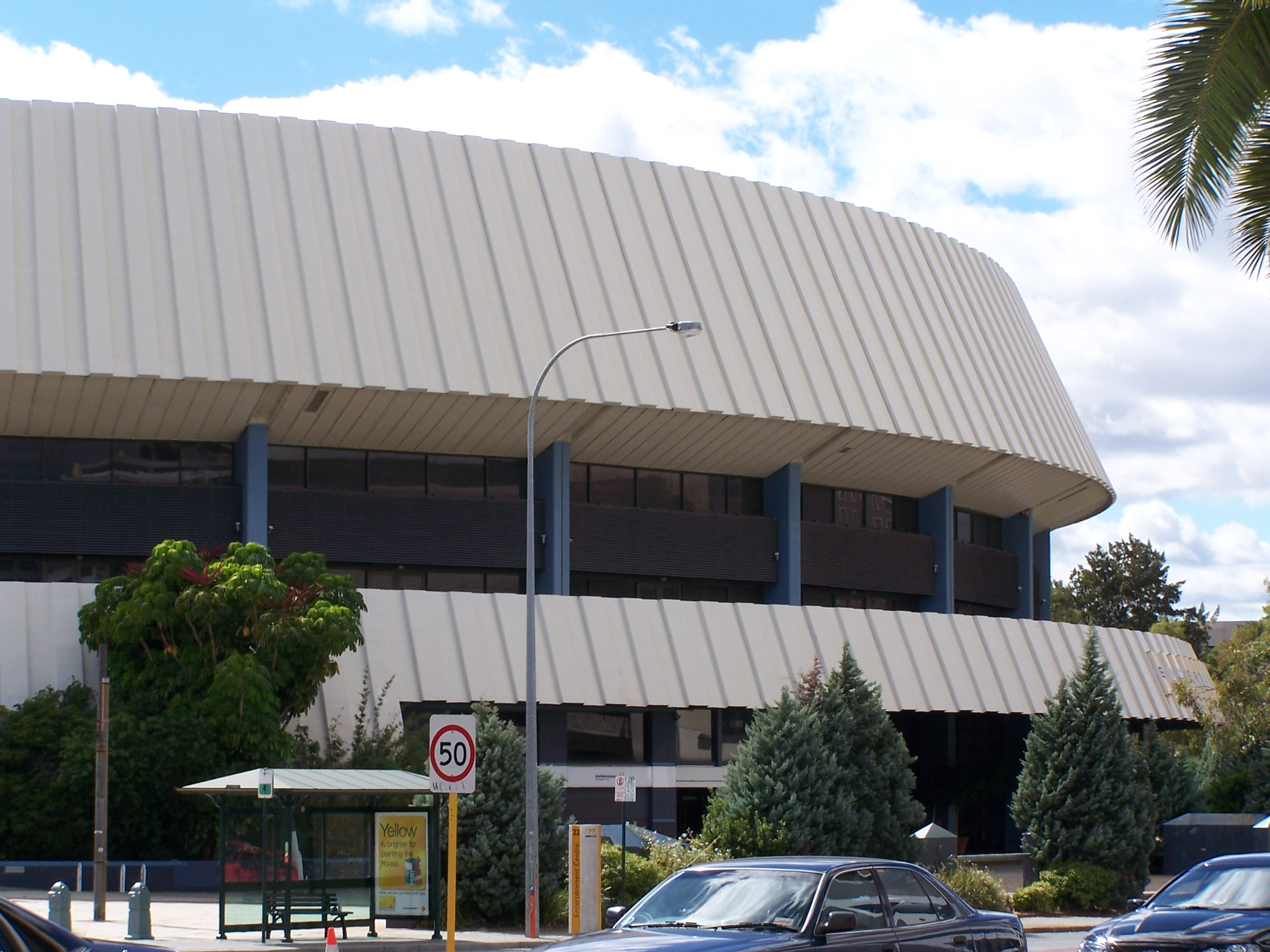
- Interactive map of Perth Entertainment Centre
- Former names: Channel 7 Edgley Entertainment Centre (1974–1975)
- Location: Perth, Western Australia
- Coordinates: 31°56′57″S 115°51′16″E
- Owner: TVW Channel 7
- Capacity: 8,200

Construction
- Opened: 27 December 1974
- Closed: August 2002
- Demolished: December 2011
- Cost: A$8.3M, equivalent to A$76.3M in 2022
- Architects: Hobbs, Winning and Leighton

Tenants
- Perth Wildcats (NBL) (1990–2002); Perth Breakers (WNBL) (1993)

The Perth Entertainment Centre was an indoor arena and cinema complex in Perth, Western Australia, located on Wellington Street at the northern edge of the Perth central business district. It was demolished as part of the Perth City Link project in late 2011, with its replacement, RAC Arena, opening the following year.

== History ==
The venue was conceived and championed by the late Brian Treasure, then General Manager at Perth television station TVW 7 and theatrical entrepreneur Michael Edgley. Their interest was principally that their two organisations had mounted large stage shows which toured the country in circus tents; a process that created major logistical challenges. The venue was designed by architects Hobbs, Winning and Leighton and was forecast to cost $5 million, but its construction coincided with a period of intense industrial action. Delays and interruptions, including strike action which was timed to coincide with concrete pours, led to a cost blow-out. The final cost was $8.3 million and interest charges put immediate financial pressure on the venture.

The venue opened on 27 December 1974 as the Channel 7 Edgley Entertainment Centre with the Australian debut of the second Disney on Parade show. In around 1975 the owners approached the State and Federal governments for assistance and the Government of Western Australia took ownership of the building, renaming it The Perth Entertainment Centre.

With a capacity of 8003 seats, the Entertainment Centre was Perth's primary large concert venue from 1974 until its closure in 2002. It was listed in the Guinness Book of World Records as the largest purpose built regular theatre (containing a proscenium arch) in the world. The venue also played host to a number of theatrical extravaganzas, as well as a range of other events including musicals, circuses, corporate functions and international beauty pageants (Miss Universe 1979).

The Entertainment Centre was home to NBL team Perth Wildcats from 1990 until 2002. It was also home to the Perth Breakers of the WNBL in 1993.

At the front of the Perth Entertainment Centre (west side) was "The Academy Twin Cinemas" which opened on 17 January 1975. The name changed to "Academy West End Alternative Cinemas" in June 1986. The name changed again to "Lumiere Cinema" in 1989. The "Lumiere Cinema" closed on 28 June 1996. The theatre remained empty, and was demolished along with the Perth Entertainment Centre.

=== Concerts ===
List of concerts
- Eric Clapton – 28 April 1975 and 28 November 1984
- The Sweet – 22 August 1975
- John Denver – 13–14 October 1975, 10 May 1983 and 1 December 1994
- Status Quo – 17 October 1975, with Snafu, 24 November 1976, 2–3 August 1978 and 16 November 2000
- Wings – 1 November 1975
- Queen – 11 April 1976, with Lucifer
- The Skyhooks – 21 August 1976 and 7 May 1983
- Rainbow – 4 November 1976, with Buffalo
- AC/DC – 2 December 1976, 15 February 1977, 13 February 1981, 1–2 February 1988 and 23–24 October 1991
- The Robin Trower Band – 31 January 1977
- Rod Stewart – February 8th - 9th (2 shows), 1977
- ABBA – 10th (2 shows)–11th–12th (2 shows) March 1977
- Alice Cooper – 14–15 March 1977, 5 September 1997, 23 February 2000 and 17 April 2001
- Jethro Tull – 4–5 September 1977 and 14 March 1994
- Tina Turner – 10 September 1977 with Magna Carta
- 10cc – 24 September 1977
- Lou Reed – 7 November 1977
- Electric Light Orchestra – 17 September 1978
- Fleetwood Mac – 18–19 November 1977, 21–22 February 1980, with John Paul Young and 8–9 April 1990
- Boz Scaggs – 9 March 1978, with Dragon, 17 September 1980
- The Beach Boys – 14–15 March 1978
- Bob Dylan – 25 and 27 March 1978, 16–17 February 1986, with Tom Petty and the Heartbreakers, 18 March 1992 and 18 March 2001, with Paul Kelly
- Billy Joel – 1 April 1978, 3–4 and 6 November 1987 and 13–14 December 1994
- Bette Midler – 4 November 1978
- Peter Frampton – 9–10 November 1978, with Cold Chisel
- Olivia Newton-John – 12 November 1978
- David Bowie – 14–15 November 1978, with The Angels and 4–6 November 1983
- Bob Marley and the Wailers – 23 April 1979
- Elton John – 7 December 1979, 21 December 1980, 7–8 April 1982, 6–7 March 1984, 25–26 November 1986, 27–29 January 1990 and 23–24 February 1993
- The Police – 19 March 1980 and 26 February 1981
- The Boomtown Rats – 10 June 1980
- Thin Lizzy – 18 October 1980
- Cold Chisel – 24 October 1980 and 15 October 1983
- KISS – 8–11 November 1980 and 4 February 1995
- Dire Straits – 22 March 1981, 24 March 1983 and 13–20 April 1986
- Johnny Cash – 16 June 1981 and 2–3 March 1994
- The Cure – 22 August 1981, 28 August 1992 and 10 October 2000
- The Kinks – 14 February 1982
- Devo – 17 February 1982
- Elvis Costello – 21 May 1982, with The Attractions, 15 December 1987, with The Confederates and 18 September 1991, with Rude 5
- Madness – 27 October 1982
- Joan Jett and the Blackhearts – 6 December 1982
- Barry Manilow – 14–15 May 1983 and 13 June 1996
- Duran Duran – 27 November 1983
- The Manhattan Transfer – 30 November 1983
- Robert Plant – 28 January 1984
- Split Enz – 12 February 1984, 8 October 1984
- INXS – 24 February and 27–28 September 1984, 4–5 September 1985, 6–7 and 9 November 1988, with Sting, 15–16 April 1991 and 20 March and 21 May 2000
- U2 – 23–24 September 1984, with Matt Finish and 21–23 September 1989, with B.B. King and Weddings Parties Anything
- Cliff Richard – 25–26 October 1984, 16–17 February 1988, 3–4 March 1990, 9–10 November 1991, 28 February and 1 March 1995 and 1–2 March 1998
- Deep Purple – 27 November 1984 and 5 March 2001
- Tina Turner – 23–24 December 1984, 23–24 December 1985, 23–24 February 1988, 11 October 1993, 29–30 October 1993 and 3–5 April 1997
- Neil Young – 1 March 1985, with Crazy Horse and The International Harvesters and 5 April 1989, with The Lost Dogs
- Phil Collins – 20 April 1985 and 4–5 April 1990
- The Stranglers – 18 May 1985
- Meat Loaf – 22 June 1985
- The Motels – 30 August 1985
- The Australian Crawl – 1 February 1986 (their last concert)
- The Thompson Twins – 14 February 1986
- Santana – 5 and 7 June 1986 and 7 May 1996, with Emmylou Harris
- Joe Cocker – 4 November 1986, 30 September 1988, 26 November 1992, 8 September 1995, 31 January 1998
- Jackson Browne – 2 December 1986
- Genesis – 5 and 6 December 1986
- ZZ Top – 9–10 March 1987 and 17 April 2000
- Crowded House – 15 July 1987 and 6 August 1988
- Simply Red – 29–30 August and 1 September 1987, with Sinéad O'Connor, 19 August 1989, with Sinéad O'Connor, 3 October 1992, with Sinéad O'Connor and 10 April 1996, with Sinéad O'Connor
- Midnight Oil – 10 October 1987 and 11 June 1993
- John Farnham – 11 November 1987
- George Michael – 8–9 March 1988
- John Mellencamp – 9–10 April 1988 and 1–2 May 1992
- Whitney Houston – 31 October 1988
- Bryan Ferry – 11 November 1988
- The Robert Cray Band – 3 December 1988
- Robert Palmer 27 February 1989
- Poison – 12 July 1989
- The Black Sorrows – 3 August 1989
- Johnny Diesel & The Injectors – 5 August 1989
- Jimmy Barnes – 12 December 1988, 27–28 October 1989 and 23 November 1990, with The Stray Cats
- Bon Jovi – 8 November 1989 and 4 October 1993, with Jimmy Barnes and Rough Justice
- Simple Minds – 18 November 1989
- Eurythmics – 28–29 November 1989
- Tracy Chapman – 13 February 1990
- Steve Earle – 18 August 1990, with The Dukes and Johnny Diesel and Nick Barker & the Reptiles
- The Angels – 4 September 1990, with Cheap Trick
- Aerosmith – 15 October 1990
- Kylie Minogue – 13 February 1991 and 28 and 30 April 2001
- Steve Winwood – 18 March 1991
- Diana Ross – 24 October 1991
- Paul Simon – 5–6 November 1991
- Amy Grant – 16 March 1992
- Rod Stewart – 22–23 March 1992
- George Thorogood & The Destroyers 21 April 1992
- Def Leppard – 11 July 1992
- The Cure – 28 August 1992 and 10 October 2000
- The Red Hot Chili Peppers – 17 October 1992, 10 May 1996 and 7 February 2000
- Hoodoo Gurus – 24 October 1992, with L7
- Richard Marx – 14 November 1992
- Hunters and Collectors – 18 December 1992
- Metallica – 7–8 April 1993 and 11–12 April 1998
- Bobby Brown – 26 April 1993
- Arrested Development – 29 April 1993
- Faith No More – 30 April 1993, with Storytime, 17 August 1995 and 1 November 1997
- Ugly Kid Joe – 19 October 1993
- Bryan Adams – 25 January 1994 and 13 March 2000
- Lenny Kravitz – 16 February 1994
- Peter Gabriel – 21 February 1994
- Depeche Mode – 5 March 1994
- East 17 – 27 March 1994
- B.B. King – 9 May 1994 and 10 May 1997
- Culture Beat – 22 May 1994, with Cut 'N' Move and Melodie MC
- Cypress Hill – 27 May 1994, with Ice Cube
- Garth Brooks – 5 September 1994
- The Pet Shop Boys – 1 November 1994
- Pantera – 18 November 1994, 24 September 1996 and 20 May 2001
- R.E.M. – 13–14 January 1995, with Died Pretty and Grant Lee Buffalo
- Roxette – 17–18 January 1995
- Janet Jackson – 23 February 1995
- Pearl Jam – 6 March 1995, with The Meanies and 19–20 March 1998, with Shudder to Think
- Foreigner – 22 April 1995
- Take That – 4 October 1995
- Tom Jones – 28 November 1995 and 29 May 2000
- Chris Isaak – 14 February 1996
- The Smashing Pumpkins – 4 March 1996
- Celine Dion – 18 March 1996, with Human Nature
- Everclear – 26 September 1996, with Silverchair and Jebediah
- Sting – 19 October 1996
- The Sex Pistols – 24 October 1996
- Bush – 6 November 1996, with The Superjesus
- The Corrs – 4 February 1997 and 4 February 1998
- Live – 12 May 1997 and 16 March 2000, with Sugar Ray and Rumanastone
- Tina Arena – 22 November 1997
- Silverchair – 20 December 1997 with Magic Dirt and Ammonia, and 8 August 1999 with Pre-Shrunk and Placebo
- Radiohead – 10 February 1998, with The Big Heavy Stuff
- Oasis – 26 February 1998, with You Am I
- Van Halen – 29 April 1998, with The Poor
- Plácido Domingo – 8 September 1998, with Julia Migenes
- The Beastie Boys – 11 February 1999, with Spiderbait and B(if)tek
- The Offspring – 21 June 1999, with Guttermouth and The Andy Callison Project and 17 March 2001, with 28 Days and H-Block 101
- Alanis Morissette – 5 October 1999, with Garbage and Stellar
- Macy Gray – 1 May 2000
- Ben Harper & The Innocent Criminals – 14 June 2000, with The Wicked Beat Sound System
- Matchbox 20 – 14 November 2000
- The Wiggles – 5–6 December 2000 and 4–5 December 2001
- Blink-182 – 9 April 2001
- Roxy Music – 19 August 2001
- Robbie Williams – 1 November 2001
- Tool – 4 May 2002, with The Melvins
- Youth Alive WA – August 2002 (the final show at the venue before closing.)

== Demolition ==
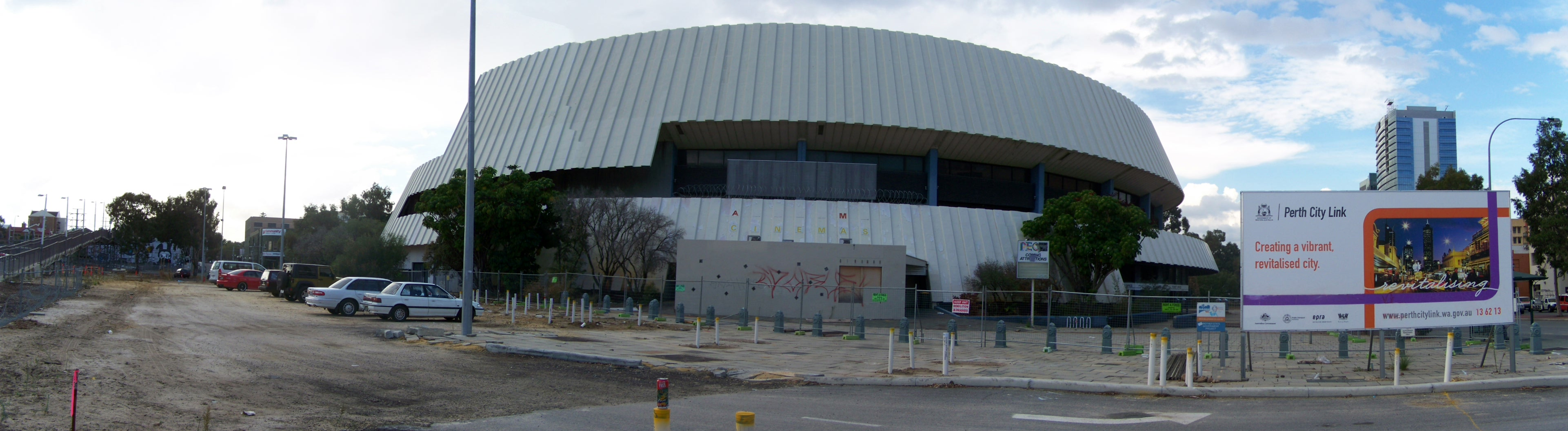
The disused venue in May 2011

The venue was owned by the Seven Network and was officially closed in August 2002. In 2005, the Government of Western Australia unveiled plans for a new entertainment centre to be built on the site of the carpark for the existing centre. In 2006, the new centre was officially given the name of Perth Arena. Demolition of the disused venue began on 11 May 2011 and was completed in December 2011, in preparation for the State Government's Perth City Link project and included tentative approvals for new residential and business towers on the site.

| Preceded by Acapulco Convention Center (Mexico) Acapulco | Miss Universe venue 1979 | Succeeded by Sejong Cultural Center (South Korea) Seoul |
