= Ben Pepper =

Australian basketball player

Personal information
- Born: 15 July 1975 (age 51) Geraldton, Western Australia, Australia
- Listed height: 213 cm (7 ft 0 in)
- Listed weight: 112 kg (247 lb)

Career information
- NBA draft: 1997: 2nd round, 55th overall pick
- Drafted by: Boston Celtics
- Playing career: 1996–2008
- Position: Centre

Career history
- 1996–1997: Newcastle Falcons
- 1998: North Melbourne Giants
- 1999–2001: Victoria Titans
- 2002–2003: Wollongong Hawks
- 2004: Victoria Giants
- 2005–2007: New Zealand Breakers
- 2007–2008: Townsville Crocodiles

Career highlights
- NBL Most Improved Player (1997); NBL Sixth Man of the Year (1997)
- Stats at Basketball Reference

Ben Pepper (born 15 July 1975) is an Australian former professional basketball player who played twelve seasons in the National Basketball League (NBL).

== Early life ==
Pepper was born and raised in Geraldton, Western Australia.

== Professional career ==
Pepper began his pro career in the NBL with the Newcastle Falcons in the 1996 NBL season. After an impressive debut season he would go on to win the NBL's Most Improved Player and the NBL's Sixth Man of the Year awards in 1997.

Pepper then decided to try his luck with the NBA and entered into the 1997 NBA draft. He was selected by the Boston Celtics with the 56th overall pick, one of four Australians drafted that year. Pepper was one of three 7-foot-tall Australian centres selected in the 1997 draft, the others being Chris Anstey and Paul Rogers. A fourth Australian, C. J. Bruton, was also selected in the draft.

The Celtics never signed Pepper and he came back to the NBL and played for the North Melbourne Giants in the 1998 season. After the season the Giants merged with cross-Melbourne rivals the South East Melbourne Magic to become the Victorian Titans where he became one of the most dominant centres in the competition. He narrowly missed out on an NBL championship when the Titans were defeated 2–1 in the 1998–99 NBL grand final series by the Adelaide 36ers.

Pepper signed with the Wollongong Hawks for the 2001–02 NBL season and spent two seasons there before switching back to Victoria to play for the Victoria Giants in 2003–04. When the Giants folded after the 2004 season, he was signed up by the New Zealand Breakers for the 2004–05 and 2005–06 NBL seasons and was named Breakers MVP for the 2005–06 season.

After two seasons in New Zealand, Pepper was signed by the Townsville Crocodiles. In his first year with the Crocs he had the fifth-best field goal percentage in the league, shooting at 58.2%. He retired from the NBL after the 2007–08 season.

Despite being a dominant player in the NBL for numerous years Ben Pepper rarely played for the Australian Boomers. In 1997, he was a member of the gold medal-winning Australian team at the FIBA Under-21 World Championship held in Melbourne.
