= List of basketball players with most career points =

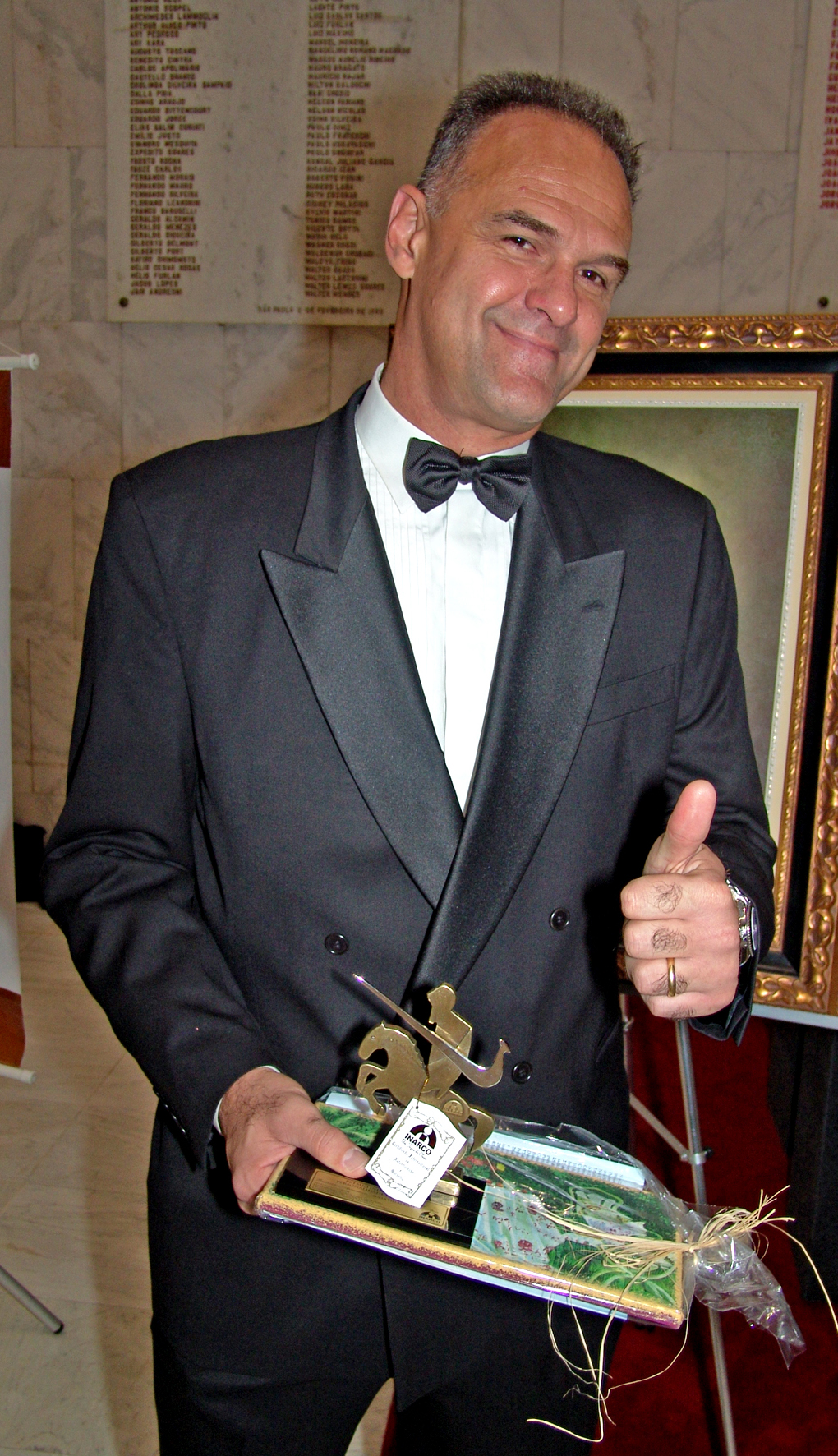
Oscar Schmidt, the previous record holder.

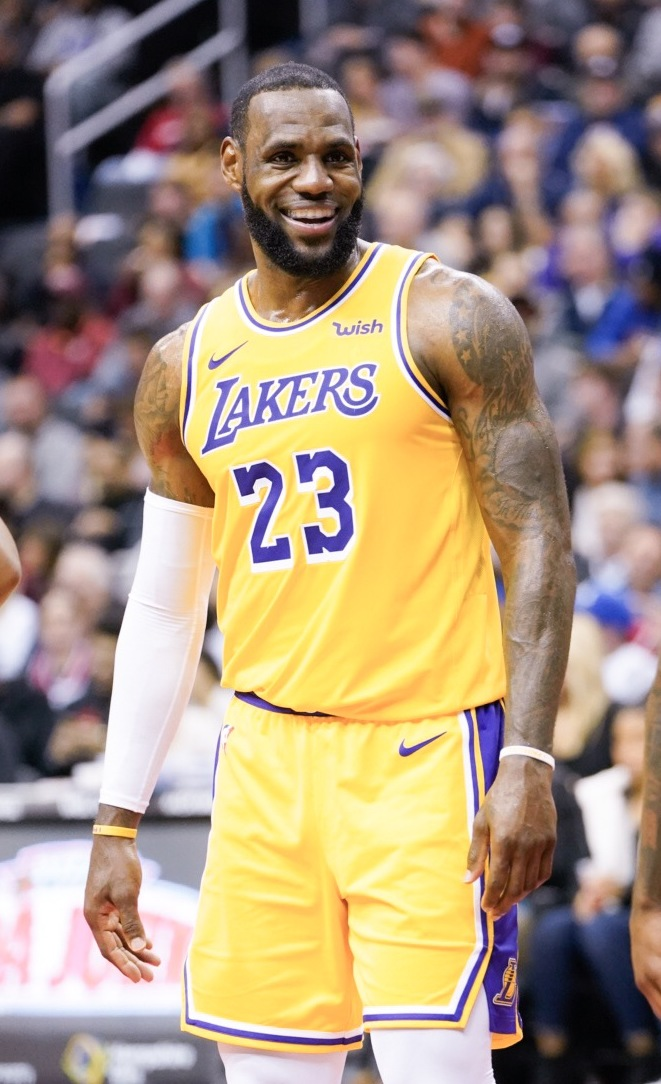
LeBron James, the current record holder.

The following is a list of basketball players by total professional career points scored. It includes points scored in national league and cup games, national team games, international club games, All-Star basketball games, and any other games played for professional or national teams. (High school/college games are not counted due to being amateur leagues).

American LeBron James is basketball's all-time top scorer with over 50,000 points scored over his 22-year active career. He is also the NBA's all-time leading scorer and the only player to have surpassed 40,000 regular-season points in the league. Oscar Schmidt held a record with 49,737 points. James broke Schmidt's record on April 2, 2024.

Other players who did not make the list but have achieved the highest all-time scoring records in domestic leagues - other than NBA - are: Hervé Dubuisson with 19,013 points in the French league, Andrew Gaze with 18,908 points in the NBL, Ramon Fernandez with 18,996 points in the PBA, Wilfredo Ruiz with 18,512 in the Uruguayan Championship, Héctor Campana with 17,359 points in Argentina's league, George Torres with 15,863 pts in Puerto Rico's league, Louie Dampier with 13,276 points in the ABA, Antonello Riva with 14,397 in the Serie A, Vinko Jelovac with 7,351 points in the Yugoslav First Federal League, Alberto Herreros with 9,759 points in the Liga ACB, Edward Jurkiewicz, with 23,726 points in the Polish Premier Championship (1947–present), Eugeniusz Kijewski with 10,185 points in the Polish Premier League (1976–present), Jiří Zídek Sr. with 10,838 points in the Czechoslovak Championship, Zhu Fangyu with 11,165 points in the Chinese Basketball Association, Willy Steveniers with 11,870 points in the Belgian league, Mike Jackel with 10,873 points in Germany's league, Doron Jamchi with 9,611 points in Israel's league, and Nick Galis with 12,864 points in the HBF Greek Championship (1963–1992).

== Players ==
^	Active player
*	Inducted into the Naismith Memorial Basketball Hall of Fame
†	Not yet eligible for Hall of Fame consideration (Note: A player is not eligible for induction into the Naismith Memorial Basketball Hall of Fame until he has been fully retired for three calendar years.)
§	1st time eligible for Hall of Fame in 2023

Rank	Player	Pos	Teams played for	Total points (Regular Season, Playoffs, National Team)	Regular season League points	Playoff League points	National team points	All-Star game points	International club games points	Other cups points	NBA draft	References
1	(United States) LeBron James^*	SF	Cleveland Cavaliers (2003–2010, 2014–2018); Miami Heat (2010–2014); Los Angeles Lakers (2018–2026)	53,746	43,440	8,521	1,137	502 (449 (Note: LeBron James has scored 449 points in the NBA All-Star Games and 53 in the Rising Challenge (2004 and 2005)); 53 (NBA Rising Stars Challenge))	47 (Note: LeBron James in international club games: scored 22 pts on 22 Oct. 2010 (Miami Heat -CSKA Moscow 96–85), 12 pts on 9 Oct. 2009 (Cleveland Cavaliers – Olympiacos 111–94), 13 pts on 17 Oct. 2006 (Cleveland Cavaliers – Maccabi Tel Aviv 93–67))	75 (NBA Play-In) ; 24 (NBA Cup Final 2023)	2003, round: 1 / pick: 1st overall. Selected by the Cleveland Cavaliers	
2	(Brazil) Oscar Schmidt*	SG / SF	Palmeiras (1974–1978, Sírio (1978–1982), América do Rio (1982), Caserta (1982–1990), Pavia (1990–1993), Forum Valladolid (1995–1997), Corinthians (1995–1997), Bandeirantes / Mackenzie (1997–1999), C.R. Flamengo (1999–2003)	49,737	42,044 (Note: Oscar Schmidt scored 13,957 pts in Italian Serie A (403 games), and 2,009 pts in Spanish ACB (71 games). During his Brazil pro career he scored: 2,033 pts for Palmeiras (82 games) 4,351 pts for Sirio (146 games), 4,613 pts for Barueri (120 games), 7,241 pts for Flamengo (219 games). Αnd 26,078 pts in Brazilian league (815 games), without including his 1982 season with America do Rio) (Combined Regular Season and Playoffs)		7,693 (Note: Oscar Schmidt scored 7,693 (326 games) for Brazil, 569 pts in 31 games for Amateur Brazil and 393 in 15 games for the São Paulo Selection.)	236 (Note: Oscar Schmidt scored 186 points in the Italian All-Star Games (1984, 1985, 1986, 1987, 1989, 1990, 1991), 46 pts in the ULEB All-Star Games (1992, 1993, 1994), 4 pts in the 2017 NBA All-Star Game (as a celebrity) and played in the 1991 FIBA All-Star Game)	(Note: Oscar Schmidt played in the 1979 FIBA Intercontinental Cup with Sirio: Scored 42 pts in the final game, plus 3 more appearances)	(Note: Oscar Schmidt: in domestic and other cups)	1984, round: 6 / pick: 131st overall. Selected by the New Jersey Nets	
3	(United States) Kareem Abdul-Jabbar*	C	Milwaukee Bucks (1969–1975), Los Angeles Lakers (1975–1989)	44,149	38,387	5,762	-	251	-	-	1969, round: 1 / pick: 1st overall. Selected by the Milwaukee Bucks	
4	(United States) Karl Malone*	PF	Utah Jazz (1985–2003), Los Angeles Lakers (2003–2004)	41,860	36,928	4,761	171	145	-	-	1985, round: 1 / pick: 13th overall. Selected by the Utah Jazz	
5	(United States) Kobe Bryant*	SG	Los Angeles Lakers (1996–2016)	39,787	33,643	5,640	504	321 (All-Star: 290; Rising Stars: 31) (Note: Kobe Bryant has scored 290 points in the NBA All-Star Games and 31 in the Rising Stars Challenge (1997))	64	-	1996, round: 1 / pick: 13th overall. Selected by the Charlotte Hornets	
6	(United States) Michael Jordan*	SG	North Carolina Tar Heels (1981–1984), Chicago Bulls (1984–1993, 1995–1998), Washington Wizards (2001–2003)	38,770	32,292	5,987	491	299 (NBA: 262; Liga ACB Presentation Games: 37) (Note: Michael Jordan scored 262 points in the NBA All-Star Games and 37 in the Liga ACB Presentation Games)	129 (Note: Michael Jordan in international club games: played on 20 Oct. 1983 (Berloni Torino – North Carolina Tar Heels 71–87), 34 pts on 21 Oct. 1983 (Greece – North Carolina Tar Heels 83–100), 26 pts on 21 Oct. 1983 (Red Star Belgrade – North Carolina Tar Heels 104–105, OT 85–85 & 92–92), scored 14 pts on 23 Oct. 1983 (Greece – North Carolina Tar Heels 71–79), 55 pts in 1997 McDonald's Open)	-	1984, round: 1 / pick: 3rd overall. Selected by the Chicago Bulls	
7	(Germany) Dirk Nowitzki*	PF/C	Dallas Mavericks (1998–2019)	36,357	31,560	3,663	1,134	122	8 (Note: Dirk Nowitzki in international club games: scored 8 pts on 6 Oct. 2012 (Alba Berlin – Dallas Mavericks 84–89))	133	1998, round: 1 / pick: 9th overall. Selected by the Dallas Mavericks	
8	(United States) Kevin Durant^	PF/SF	Seattle Supersonics (2007–08), Oklahoma City Thunder (2008-2016), Golden State Warriors (2016-2019), Brooklyn Nets (2020–23), Phoenix Suns (2023–present)	35,743	30,240	4,985	518	337 (All-Star: 268; Rising Stars Challenge: 69)	120 (57; International exhibitions: 63)	NBA Summer League: 51	2007, round: 1 / pick: 2nd Selected by the Seattle Supersonics	
9	(United States) Wilt Chamberlain*	C	Philadelphia/San Francisco Warriors (1959–1965), Philadelphia 76ers (1965–1968), Los Angeles Lakers (1968–1973)	35,026	31,419	3,607	-	191	-	-	1959, pick: Territorial. Selected by the Philadelphia Warriors	
10	(United States) Julius Erving*	SF	Virginia Squires (1971–1974), Brooklyn Nets (1973–1976), Philadelphia 76ers (1976–1988)	34,606	30,026 (ABA: 11,662; NBA: 18,364)	4,580 (ABA: 1,492; NBA; 3,088)	-	321 (ABA: 100; NBA: 221) (Note: Julius Erving has scored 221 points in the ABA All-Star Games and 100 in the NBA All-Star Games)	-	-	1972, round: 1 / pick: 12th overall. Selected by the Milwaukee Bucks	
11	(United States) Shaquille O'Neal*	C	Orlando Magic (1992–1996); Los Angeles Lakers (1996–2004); Miami Heat (2004–2008); Phoenix Suns (2008–2009); Cleveland Cavaliers (2009–2010); Boston Celtics (2010–2011)	34,064	28,596	5,250	218	202	12 (Note: Shaquille O'Neal in international club games: scored 12 pts on 9 Oct. 2009 (Cleveland Cavaliers – Olympiacos 111–94))	-	1992, round: 1 / pick: 1st overall. Selected by the Orlando Magic	
12	(United States) Carmelo Anthony*	SF	Denver Nuggets (2003–2011); New York Knicks (2011–2017); Oklahoma City Thunder (2017–2018); Houston Rockets (2018); Portland Trail Blazers (2019–2021); Los Angeles Lakers (2021–2022)	32,434	29,141 (Regular: 28,289; Preseason: 852)	1,914	1,068	233 (All-Star: 185; Rising Stars: 48) (Note: Anthony scored 185 points in the NBA All-Star Games and 48 in the Rising Stars Challenge (2004, 2005))	57 (Note: Carmelo Anthony in international club games: scored 17 pts on 3 Oct. 2009 (Denver Nuggets – Partizan Belgrade 102–70), 21 pts on 10 Oct. 2006 (Denver Nuggets – Efes Pilsen 118–102), scored pts 19 on 8 Oct. 2017 (Melbourne United – Oklahoma City Thunder) 85–86)		2003, round: 1 / pick: 3d overall. Selected by the Denver Nuggets	
13	(United States) Moses Malone*	C	Utah Stars (1974–1975), Spirits of St. Louis (1975–1976), Buffalo Braves (1976–1977), Houston Rockets (1976–1983), Philadelphia 76ers (1982–1987), Washington Bullets (1986–1989), Atlanta Hawks (1988–1992), Milwaukee Bucks (1991–1994), Philadelphia 76ers (1993–1995), San Antonio Spurs (1994–1995)	31,793	29,580 (ABA: 2,171; NBA: 27,409)	2,213 (ABA: 136; NBA: 2,077)	-	134 (ABA: 6; NBA: 128) (Note: Moses Malone scored 6 points in the ABA All-Star Games and 128 in the NBA All-Star Games)	-	-	1974, round: 3. Selected by the Utah Stars	
14	(United States) Tim Duncan*	PF/C	San Antonio Spurs (1997–2017)	31,771	26,496	5,172	103	140	-	-	1997, round: 1 / pick: 1st overall. Selected by the San Antonio Spurs	
15	(United States) James Harden^	SG	Oklahoma City Thunder (2009-2012), Houston Rockets (2012-2021), Brooklyn Nets (2020-2022), Philadelphia 76ers (2021-2023), Los Angeles Clippers (2023-present)	31,122	27,186	3,764	172	195 (All-Star: 143; Rising Stars: 52)	NBA International games: 78	NBA Summer League: 202	2009, round 1 / 3rd overall. Selected by the Oklahoma City Thunder	
16	(Nigeria) Hakeem Olajuwon*	C	Houston Rockets (1984–2001), Toronto Raptors (2001–2003)	30,736	26,946	3,755	35	117	-	-	1984, round: 1 / pick: 1st overall. Selected by the Houston Rockets	
17	(United States) Dan Issel*	PF/C	Kentucky Colonels (ABA), (1970-1975), Denver Nuggets (NBA) 1975-1985	30,416	27,482 (ABA: 12,823; NBA: 14,659)	2,934 (ABA: 1,029; NBA: 1,905)	-	103 (ABA: 103; NBA: 0)	-	-	1970: NBA, round 8, pick 3 / 122 overall (Detroit Pistons) + 1970: ABA: round 1 (Kentucky Colonels)	
18	(United States) John Havlicek*	SF/SG	Boston Celtics (1962-1978)	30,171	26,395	3,776	-	179			1962: NBA, round 1 / 9th overall (Boston Celtics) + 1962 NFL: round 7 / 95th overall (Cleveland Browns)	
19	(United States) Paul Pierce*	SF/SG	Boston Celtics (1998-2013), Brooklyn Nets (2013-2014), Washington Wizards (2014-2015), Los Angeles Clippers (2015-2017)	29,755	26,397	3,180	178	114 (All-Star: 96; Rising Stars: 18)			1998: round 1 / 10th overall. Selected by the Boston Celtics.	
20	(United States) Stephen Curry^	PG	Golden State Warriors (2009-present)	29,066	24,945	3,966	155	216		-	2009, round: 1 / pick: 7th overall. Selected by the Golden State Warriors	

== See also ==
- List of basketball players who have scored 100 points in a single game
- FIBA Basketball World Cup records
- List of games played between NBA and international teams
- EuroLeague career statistical leaders
- List of National Basketball Association career scoring leaders
