= NBL (Australia) All-time Records =

Basketball records

The National Basketball League (NBL) is the premier professional men's basketball league in Australia and New Zealand. It was established in 1979. Andrew Gaze is widely considered one of the league's greatest players and features heavily in these records. Since its inaugural season he has had seven of the top ten seasons for average points scored. Gaze is also the league's highest career point scorer with 18,908. Statistics have been kept for both individuals and teams since its inception.

Bold - Denotes active NBL player

== Individual Records ==
=== Points ===
==== Highest Scoring Averages – Season ====
Average	Player	Team	Games	Season
44.1	(Australia) Andrew Gaze	Melbourne Tigers	20	1987
39.5	(United States) / (Australia) Al Green	West Adelaide Bearcats	21	1984
38.8	(Australia) Andrew Gaze	Melbourne Tigers	28	1991
37.6	(Australia) Andrew Gaze	Melbourne Tigers	22	1990
36.9	(Australia) Andrew Gaze	Melbourne Tigers	24	1988
36.9	(Australia) Andrew Gaze	Melbourne Tigers	25	1986
35.4	(United States) Paul Stanley	Hobart Devils	26	1987
34.5	(Australia) Andrew Gaze	Melbourne Tigers	27	1989
33.9	(United States) Wayne McDaniel	Hobart Devils	25	1990
33.9	(Australia) Andrew Gaze	Melbourne Tigers	29	1995

==== Highest Scoring Averages – Career ====
Minimum of 60 games:

Average	Player	Team(s)	Games	Seasons
32.6	(United States) Paul Stanley	Melbourne Tigers, Hobart Devils	69	1986-1987, 1989-1990
30.9	(Australia) Andrew Gaze	Melbourne Tigers	612	1984-2005
29.3	(United States) Bobby Locke	Geelong Supercats	73	1990-1992
28.7	(United States) Mike Jones	Illawarra Hawks	70	1981-1983
28.7	(United States) Jerry Everett	Newcastle Falcons	85	1987-1991
28.2	(United States) Vince Kelley	Bankstown Bruins/West Sydney Westars	77	1985-1987
17.7	(United States) Norman Taylor	Illawarra Hawks	67	1989-1991
27.6	(United States) Ken Epperson	St. Kilda/Westside Saints	76	1986-1988
26.9	(United States) Jason Reese	Hobart Devils, Canberra Cannons, North Melbourne Giants	106	1991-1994
26.8	(United States) James Bullock	Melbourne Tigers, Newcastle Falcons	76	1988, 1990-1991

==== Most Individual Points – Career ====
Points	Player	Team(s)	Seasons
18,908	(Australia) Andrew Gaze	Melbourne Tigers	1984-2005
13,106	(United States) / (Australia) Leroy Loggins	Brisbane Bullets, West Adelaide Bearcats	1981-2001
11,121	(United States) James Crawford	Geelong Supercats, Canberra Cannons, Perth Wildcats	1982-1999, 2003
10,735	(United States) / (Australia) Lanard Copeland	Melbourne Tigers, Brisbane Bullets, Adelaide 36ers	1992-2008
10,154	(Australia) Tony Ronaldson	Eastside Spectres, South East Melbourne Magic, Victoria Titans, Perth Wildcats, New Zealand Breakers	1990-2010
9,621	(Australia) Mark Bradtke	Adelaide 36ers, Melbourne Tigers, Brisbane Bullets	1988-2007
9,379	(United States) / (Australia) Derek Rucker	Brisbane Bullets, Newcastle Falcons, Townsville Suns, West Sydney Razorbacks	1990-1991, 1994-2006
9,225	(United States) / (Australia) Scott Fisher	North Melbourne Giants, Perth Wildcats	1987-2002
9,080	(United States) / (Australia) Robert Rose	South East Melbourne Magic, Adelaide 36ers, Canberra Cannons, Townsville Crocodiles, Cairns Taipans	1992-2006
9,065	(Australia) Shane Heal	Brisbane Bullets, Geelong Supercats, Sydney Kings, South Dragons, Gold Coast Blaze	1988-1996, 1998, 2000-2003, 2006-2009

==== Most Points in a Game – Individual (all time) ====
Key
Denotes player's team lost the game

Points	Player	Team	Opponent	Score	Date	References
**71**^{[a]}	(United States) / (Australia) Al Green	West Adelaide Bearcats	Frankston Bears	125-153	25 May, 1984	
**63**^{[b]}	(United States) Reg Biddings	Forestville Eagles	Bankstown Bruins	98-90	12 April, 1981	
**61**	(Australia) Shane Heal	Brisbane Bullets	Townsville Suns	141-105	23 September, 1994	
**60**	(United States) / (Australia) Al Green	West Adelaide Bearcats	Sydney SuperSonics	154-90	5 May, 1984	
**60**	(Australia) Andrew Gaze	Melbourne Tigers	Newcastle Falcons	127-137	11 July, 1987	
**59**	(United States) / (Australia) Al Green	West Adelaide Bearcats	Coburg Giants	127-148	19 May, 1984	
**59**	(Australia) Andrew Gaze	Melbourne Tigers	Illawarra Hawks	186-158	27 July, 1991	
**59**	(United States) / (Australia) **Bryce Cotton**^{[c]}	Perth Wildcats	New Zealand Breakers	123-112	1 December, 2024	
**58**	(Australia) Andrew Gaze	Melbourne Tigers	Newcastle Falcons	132-121	20 September, 1986	
**57**	(United States) James Crawford	Perth Wildcats	Melbourne Tigers	153-119	6 September, 1987	
**57**	(United States) Wayne McDaniel	Hobart Tassie Devils	Melbourne Tigers	105-120	18 August, 1989	

^{a} 48-minute game era
^{b} first 40-minute game era
^{c} second 40-minute game era

==== Most Points in a Game – Individual (since 2009 - 40-minute game era) ====
Points	Player	Team	Opponent	Score	Date	References
59	(United States) / (Australia) **Bryce Cotton**	Perth Wildcats	New Zealand Breakers	123-112	1 December, 2024	
53	(United States) / (Australia) **Bryce Cotton**	Adelaide 36ers	Cairns Taipans	91-86	18 October, 2025	
51	(United States) James Batemon	Brisbane Bullets	Perth Wildcats	105-84	17 November, 2024	
50	(Australia) **Chris Goulding**	Melbourne Tigers	Sydney Kings	92-82	9 March, 2014	
49	(New Zealand) Kirk Penney	New Zealand Breakers	Adelaide 36ers	103-89	21 January, 2010	
49	(United States) / (Australia) **Bryce Cotton**	Perth Wildcats	Adelaide 36ers	115-105	8 December, 2024	
49	(United States) / (Australia) **Bryce Cotton**	Perth Wildcats	Adelaide 36ers	112-104	7 February, 2025	
47	(Australia) **Jack McVeigh**	Cairns Taipans	New Zealand Breakers	99-95	19 December, 2025	
46	(Australia) Mitch Creek	South East Melbourne Phoenix	Sydney Kings	113-112	18 December, 2022	
46	(Australia) **Chris Goulding**	Melbourne United	Perth Wildcats	106-97	9 November, 2024	
45	(United States) / (Australia) **Bryce Cotton**	Perth Wildcats	Illawarra Hawks	95-86	5 March, 2017	
45	(United States) Derrick Walton Jr.	Sydney Kings	South East Melbourne Phoenix	112-113	18 December, 2022	

==== 40+ Point Games – Career ====
Games	Player
101	(Australia) Andrew Gaze
23	(United States) / (Australia) Leroy Loggins
22	(United States) Wayne McDaniel
20	(United States) / (Australia) Derek Rucker
18	(United States) / (Australia) Al Green
16	(United States) / (Australia) Scott Fisher
14	(United States) / (Australia) **Bryce Cotton**
13	(United States) / (Australia) James Crawford
13	(United States) Paul Stanley
12	(Australia) Michael Johnson

==== 30+ Points Per Game – Seasons ====
Seasons	Player
15	(Australia) Andrew Gaze
4	(United States) Wayne McDaniel
3	(United States) Al Green
3	(United States) / (Australia) Scott Fisher
2	(United States) Mike Jones
2	(United States) Benny Lewis
2	(United States) Bobby Locke
2	(United States) / (Australia) Derek Rucker
2	(United States) Paul Stanley
2	(United States) Tim Dillon

=== Games ===
==== Most Games Played – Individual ====
Games	Player	Team(s)	Seasons
665	(Australia) Tony Ronaldson	Eastside Spectres, South East Melbourne Magic, Victoria Titans, Perth Wildcats, New Zealand Breakers	1990-2010
612	(Australia) Andrew Gaze	Melbourne Tigers	1984-2005
567	(United States) / (Australia) Leroy Loggins	Brisbane Bullets, West Adelaide Bearcats	1981-2001
563	(Australia) Glen Saville	Illawarra/Wollongong Hawks, Sydney Kings	1995-2013
554	(Australia) Mark Bradtke	Adelaide 36ers, Melbourne Tigers, Brisbane Bullets	1988-2007
550	(Australia) **Jesse Wagstaff**	Perth Wildcats	2009-
532	(United States) / (Australia) Lanard Copeland	Melbourne Tigers, Brisbane Bullets, Adelaide 36ers	1992-2008
525	(Australia) Brett Maher	Adelaide 36ers	1992-2009
524	(Australia) Mat Campbell	Illawarra/Wollongong Hawks	1996-2012
518	(Australia) Ray Borner	Coburg/North Melbourne Giants, Illawarra/Wollongong Hawks, Geelong Supercats, Canberra Cannons	1980-2001

=== Rebounds ===
==== Most Rebounds – Individual ====
Rebounds	Player	Team	Opponent	Year
34	(United States) / (Australia) Dean Uthoff	Nunawading Spectres	Hobart Devils	1984
34	(The Bahamas) Kendal Pinder	Sydney SuperSonics	Bankstown Bruins	1985
33	(United States) / (Australia) Dean Uthoff	Nunawading Spectres	Geelong Supercats	1984
33	(United States) / (Australia) Dean Uthoff	Nunawading Spectres	Adelaide 36ers	1984
33	(The Bahamas) Kendal Pinder	Sydney SuperSonics	Perth Wildcats	1985
32	(United States) / (Australia) Dean Uthoff	Nunawading Spectres	Coburg Giants	1984
31	(United States) Dan Clausen	Adelaide 36ers	Canberra Cannons	1984
31	(United States) Terry Dozier	Newcastle Falcons	Canberra Cannons	1992
30	(The Bahamas) Kendal Pinder	Sydney SuperSonics	Hobart Devils	1985
30	(United States) Marc Ridlen	Sydney SuperSonics	Newcastle Falcons	1988

=== Assists ===
==== Most Assists – Individual ====
Assists	Player	Team	Opponent	Year
24	(United States) / (Australia) Derek Rucker	Newcastle Falcons	Geelong Supercats	1994
20	(United States) Casey Jones	Geelong Supercats	Coburg Giants	1985
20	(Australia) Shane Heal	Geelong Supercats	Adelaide 36ers	1990
20	(United States) / (Australia) Robert Rose	South East Melbourne Magic	Illawarra Hawks	1993
20	(Australia) Peter Harvey	Gold Coast Rollers	Illawarra Hawks	1995
20	(Australia) Andrew Gaze	Melbourne Tigers	North Melbourne Giants	1995
20	(Australia) Peter Harvey	Gold Coast Rollers	Hobart Tassie Devils	1995
19	(Australia) Brendan Joyce	Nunawading Spectres	Sydney SuperSonics	1985
19	(Australia) Mark Wright	Coburg Giants	Newcastle Falcons	1985
19	(United States) Fred Cofield	Canberra Cannons	Gold Coast Rollers	1995

=== Steals ===
==== Most Steals – Individual ====
Steals	Player	Team	Opponent	Year
11	(Australia) Phil Smyth	Canberra Cannons	Sydney SuperSonics	1985
11	(Australia) Scott Fenton	Sydney SuperSonics	Melbourne Tigers	1985
11	(United States) / (Australia) Darryl McDonald	North Melbourne Giants	Newcastle Falcons	1994
11	(United States) Steve Woodberry	Brisbane Bullets	Illawarra Hawks	1996
10	(United States) Jerry Dennard	Hobart Tassie Devils	Perth Wildcats	1987
10	(United States) / (Australia) Ricky Grace	Perth Wildcats	Canberra Cannons	1990
10	(United States) Greg Stokes	Southern Melbourne Saints	Hobart Tassie Devils	1991
10	(Australia) Phil Smyth	Canberra Cannons	Sydney Kings	1992
9	(United States) Steve Lankton	Devonport Warriors	Canberra Cannons	1983
9	(Australia) Damian Martin	Perth Wildcats	Sydney Kings	2014

=== Blocks ===
==== Most Blocks – Individual ====
Blocks	Player	Team	Opponent	Year
14	(Australia) John Dorge	Geelong Supercats	North Melbourne Giants	1991
12	(United States) David Van Dyke	Newcastle Falcons	Illawarra Hawks	1996
12	(United States) David Van Dyke	Perth Wildcats	Adelaide 36ers	1997
11	(United States) Darren Rowe	Geelong Supercats	Eastside Spectres	1990
11	(United States) Darren Rowe	Geelong Supercats	North Melbourne Giants	1990
10	(United States) Derick Polk	Sydney SuperSonics	Melbourne Tigers	1986
10	(United States) Willie Simmons	North Melbourne Giants	Melbourne Tigers	1987
9	(United States) Dan Clausen	Perth Wildcats	Melbourne Tigers	1986
9	(United States) Willie Simmons	North Melbourne Giants	Canberra Cannons	1987
9	(United States) Simon Dwight	West Sydney Razorbacks	Townsville Crocodiles	2004

=== Field Goals ===
==== Most Field Goals Made – Individual ====
1. 26 Al Green vs Sydney 1984
2. 25 Reg Biddings vs Bankstown 1981
3. 25 Benny Lewis vs West Adelaide 1984
4. 25 Al Green vs Frankston 1984
5. 24 Owen Wells vs Devonport 1984
6. 24 Al Green vs Coburg 1984
7. 24 Andrew Gaze vs Newcastle 1987
8. 24 James Crawford vs Melbourne 1987
9. 24 Wayne McDaniel vs Adelaide 1989
10. 23 Peter Blight vs Frankston 1984

==== Most Field Goals Attempted – Individual ====
1. 50 Reg Biddings vs Bankstown 1981
2. 48 Benny Lewis vs West Adelaide 1984
3. 45 Al Green vs Coburg 1984
4. 44 Rocky Smith vs Forestville 1981
5. 44 Al Green vs Bankstown 1984
6. 42 Rocky Smith vs Illawarra 1980
7. 41 Owen Wells vs Devonport 1984
8. 41 Al Green vs Frankston 1984
9. 41 Benny Lewis vs Coburg 1986
10. 41 Jerry Everett vs Nth Melbourne 1988

=== 3 Point Field Goals ===
==== Most Three Pointers Made – Individual ====
1. 13 Ian Davies vs St. Kilda 1985
2. 12 Shane Heal vs Townsville 1994
3. 12 Shane Heal vs Wollongong 2001
4. 11 Darryl Pearce vs Newcastle 1988
5. 11 Brett Maher vs Brisbane 1996
6. 11 Derek Rucker vs Brisbane 1998
7. 10 Ebi Ere vs Adelaide 2008
8. 10 Jason Crowe vs South 2007
9. 10 Andrew Gaze vs Brisbane 1987
10. 10 Lanard Copeland vs SE Melbourne Magic 1995
11. 10 John Rillie vs Perth 2009
12. 10 Jermaine Beal vs Melbourne 2015
13. **10 Bryce Cotton** vs Cairns 2020
14. **10 Dejan Vasiljevic** vs SE Melbourne Phoenix 2023
15. **10 Chris Goulding** vs New Zealand 2025
16. **10 Dejan Vasiljevic** vs Cairns 2025
17. **10 Chris Goulding** vs Perth 2025

==== Most Three Pointers Attempted – Individual ====
1. 24 Ian Davies vs St. Kilda 1985
2. 21 Ian Davies vs Geelong 1985
3. 21 Lanard Copeland vs West Sydney 2002
4. **21 Chris Goulding** vs Perth 2024
5. **21 Dejan Vasiljevic** vs Cairns 2025
6. 19 Brian Goorjian vs West Adelaide 1984
7. 19 Michael Morrison vs Townsville 1993
8. 19 Shane Heal vs Perth 1994
9. 19 Shane Heal vs Townsville 1994
10. 19 Darren Perry vs Geelong 1995
11. 19 Shane Heal vs Townsville 1998
12. 19 Lanard Copeland vs Brisbane 1998
13. 19 Jermaine Beal vs Melbourne 2015
14. 19 **Chris Golding** vs New Zealand 2025

== Team Records ==
=== Most Points in a Game – Team ===
1. 186 Melbourne vs Wollongong 1991
2. 170 Brisbane vs Wollongong 1989
3. 165 Nth Melbourne vs Perth 1989
4. 164 Nth Melbourne vs Newcastle 1987
5. 160 Coburg vs Frankston 1984
6. 160 Adelaide vs Hobart 1984
7. 160 SE Melbourne vs Townsville 1994
8. 160 Nth Melbourne vs Hobart 1990
9. 159 Geelong vs Hobart 1984
10. 158 Wollongong vs Melbourne 1991

=== Fewest Points in a Game – Team ===
1. 40 Devonport vs Hobart 1983
2. 43 Cairns vs Townsville 2012
3. 47 Wollongong vs Perth 2013
4. 47 Sydney vs Melbourne 2021
5. 48 Sydney vs Cairns 2010
6. 49 Cairns vs Gold Coast 2012
7. 50 Wollongong vs Gold Coast 2012
8. 51 Townsville vs Cairns 2010
9. 52 Illawarra vs New Zealand 2020
10. 55 Canberra vs Sth East Melb 1997
11. 55 Townsville vs Perth 2012
12. 55 Sydney vs Perth 2014

=== Most Points (Grand Final) – Team ===
1. 125 Adelaide vs West Sydney 2002 – Game 3
2. 122 Adelaide vs Brisbane 1986 – Game 1 (OT)
3. 121 Brisbane vs Adelaide 1985
4. 120 Canberra vs North Melbourne 1988 – Game 1
5. 119 Brisbane vs Adelaide 1986 – Game 1 (OT)
6. 117 North Melbourne vs Canberra 1988 – Game 2
7. 117 Melbourne vs Perth 1993 – Game 1
8. 117 North Melbourne vs Adelaide 1994 – Game 2
9. 117 Sydney vs Perth 2003 – Game 2
10. 116 Melbourne vs SE Melbourne 1992 – Game 1

=== Fewest Points (Grand Final) – Team ===
1. 52 New Zealand vs Perth 2016 – Game 3
2. 53 Cairns vs New Zealand 2011 – Game 3
3. 54 Nunawading vs Launceston 1981
4. 59 Adelaide vs Perth 2014 – Game 3
5. 62 SE Melbourne vs Adelaide 1998 – Game 2
6. 63 Perth vs Wollongong 2010 – Game 2
7. 66 Perth vs New Zealand 2013 – Game 2
8. 67 Melbourne vs Souths 2009 – Game 3
9. 67 Perth vs New Zealand 2013 – Game 1
10. 67 Melbourne vs Perth 2019 - Game 3

=== Most Rebounds – Team ===
1. 84 Sydney vs Hobart 1985
2. 76 Hobart vs Illawarra 1984
3. 73 Canberra vs Newcastle 1987
4. 72 Sydney vs Geelong 1986
5. 71 Canberra vs Perth 1986
6. 70 Coburg vs Perth 1982
7. 69 Canberra vs Melbourne 1984
8. 69 Sydney vs Newcastle 1988
9. 69 SE Melbourne vs Newcastle 1992
10. 68 Adelaide vs St. Kilda 1986

=== Most Assists – Team ===
1. 51 Coburg vs Devonport 1984
2. 50 Coburg vs Sydney 1984
3. 49 Coburg vs West Adelaide 1984
4. 48 Coburg vs Bankstown 1985
5. 47 Nunawading vs Devonport 1984
6. 47 Nunawading vs Illawarra 1985
7. 46 Coburg vs Illawarra 1984
8. 45 Melbourne vs St. Kilda 1984
9. 45 Brisbane vs Melbourne 1990
10. 45 Illawarra vs Melbourne 1991

=== Most Steals – Team ===
1. 29 Coburg vs Sydney 1984
2. 28 Coburg vs Devonport 1984
3. 27 Sydney vs Melbourne 1985
4. 26 Nunawading vs Coburg 1985
5. 25 Perth vs Frankston 1984
6. 24 Hobart vs St. Kilda 1984
7. 23 Sydney vs Canberra 1985
8. 23 Sydney vs Hobart 1985
9. 23 Hobart vs Perth 1987
10. 23 Hobart vs Illawarra 1990

=== Most Blocks – Team ===
1. 18 Perth vs Adelaide 1997
2. 18 West Sydney vs Townsville 2004
3. 17 Canberra vs Illawarra 1989
4. 16 Canberra vs Geelong 1984
5. 15 Frankstown vs Geelong 1983
6. 15 Geelong vs Eastside 1990
7. 15 Geelong vs Hobart 1991
8. 15 Newcastle vs Adelaide 1995
9. 15 West Sydney vs Cairns 2004
10. 14 Geelong vs Nth Melbourne 1990

=== Highest Field Goal % – Team ===
1. 76% Illawarra vs Melbourne 1991
2. 72% Nunawading vs St. Kilda 1983
3. 71% West Adelaide vs St. Kilda 1982
4. 71% St. Kilda vs Frankston 1983
5. 70% Devonport vs Geelong 1983
6. 70% Melbourne vs St. Kilda 1984
7. 68% Sydney vs Adelaide 1996
8. 67% Illawarra vs Geelong 1983
9. 67% Perth vs SE Melbourne 1995
10. 66% Sydney vs West Adelaide 1983

=== Lowest Field Goal % – Team ===
1. 28% Perth vs Sydney 2006
2. 28% Sydney vs Illawarra 1998
3. 29% Hunter vs Cairns 2003
4. 29% Coburg vs Sydney 1982
5. 29% Nth Melbourne vs SE Melbourne 1994
6. 30% Devonport vs Brisbane 1984
7. 30% Perth vs Newcastle 1991
8. 30% SE Melbourne vs Adelaide 1998
9. 30% Brisbane vs Canberra 2000
10. 30% Cairns vs Victoria 2001

== Miscellaneous ==
=== Largest Margin ===
1. 88 North Melbourne (H) def Sydney 06/05/84
2. 75 Adelaide (H) def Wollongong 20/07/85
3. 65 Adelaide def Hobart (H) 13/07/85
4. 64 Brisbane (H) def Geelong 13/02/88
5. 64 Perth (H) def Geelong 11/06/88
6. 64 West Adelaide (H) def Sydney 05/05/84
7. 63 Geelong def Perth (H) 13/04/84
8. 63 Townsville (H) def Brisbane 16/03/01
9. 62 Brisbane def Devonport (H) 03/06/84
10. 62 Brisbane (H) def Wollongong 22/06/85

=== Longest Winning Streak ===
1. 21 Brisbane 2007
2. 16 Townsville 2003
3. 16 Melbourne 1997
4. 16 Sydney 1983
5. 16 New Zealand 2013
6. 15 Geelong 1984
7. 15 Sydney 2005
8. 14 Adelaide 1986
9. 14 St. Kilda 1979
10. 13 Victoria 2002
11. 13 Sydney 2022

=== Longest Losing Streak ===
1. 26 Geelong 1988
2. 21 Cairns 2000
3. 20 Newcastle 1990
4. 20 West Sydney 2007
5. 17 Melbourne 1987
6. 17 Geelong 1992
7. 16 West Sydney 2005
8. 15 Newcastle 1991
9. 15 Canberra 2001
10. 15 Hunter 2004
11. 15 Cairns 2024

=== Longest Game ===
1. 4OT Brisbane (H) def Perth 1994
2. 4OT Melbourne def Illawarra (H) 2018

=== Statistical Feats ===
==== Most Triple-doubles - Career ====
Triple-doubles	Player	Team(s)	Seasons
13	(United States) / (Australia) Robert Rose	South East Melbourne Magic, Adelaide 36ers, Canberra Cannons, Townsville Crocodiles, Cairns Taipans	1992-2006
7	(Australia) Sam Mackinnon	South East Melbourne Magic, Townsville Crocodiles, West Sydney Razorbacks, Brisbane Bullets, Melbourne Tigers	1994-2010
6	(United States) Rashad Tucker	Perth Wildcats, Melbourne Tigers, Cairns Taipans	2003-2008
5	(United States) Cedric Jackson	New Zealand Breakers, Melbourne United, Illawarra Hawks	2011-2013, 2014-2016, 2018-2019
4	(Australia) Andrew Gaze	Melbourne Tigers	1984-2005
4	(United States) / (Australia) Mark Leader	Devonport Warriors, Geelong Supercats, North Melbourne Giants	1983-1995
4	(United States) Steve Woodberry	Gold Coast Rollers, Brisbane Bullets, Sydney Kings	1995-1999
4	(United States) / (Australia) Ricky Grace	Perth Wildcats	1990-2005
4	(Australia) Glen Saville	Illawarra/Wollongong Hawks, Sydney Kings	1995-2013
3	(United States) Darren Rowe	Geelong Supercats	1989-1994
3	(United States) / (Australia) Scott Fisher	North Melbourne Giants, Perth Wildcats	1987-2002
3	(Australia) John Rillie	Brisbane Bullets, Adelaide 36ers, West Sydney Razorbacks, Townsville Crocodiles, New Zealand Breakers	1995-2010
3	(Australia) Josh Giddey	Adelaide 36ers	2020-2021

==== Quadruple-double ====
1. 25pts, 17rbs, 11ast, 11blk Daren Rowe (Geelong) vs North Melbourne 1990

== Attendances ==
=== All-time ===
1. 18,373 Sydney vs Adelaide 29/03/2026 Grand Final G3 @ Qudos Bank Arena
2. 18,124 Sydney vs New Zealand 15/03/2023 Grand Final G5 @ Qudos Bank Arena
3. 18,049 Sydney vs New Zealand 10/03/2023 Grand Final G3 @ Qudos Bank Arena
4. 17,514 Sydney vs Illawarra 17/11/2019 Round 7 @ Qudos Bank Arena
5. 17,143 Sydney vs Canberra 02/10/1999 Round 1 @ Sydney Superdome
6. 17,000 West Sydney vs Brisbane 02/10/1999 Round 1 @ Sydney Superdome
7. 16,846 Sydney vs Adelaide 25/01/2026 Round 18 @ Qudos Bank Arena
8. 16,705 Sydney vs Tasmania 19/01/2025 Round 17 @ Qudos Bank Arena
9. 16,149 Sydney vs Tasmania 11/05/2022 Grand Final G3 @ Qudos Bank Arena
10. 15,366 South East Melbourne vs Melbourne 22/06/1996 Round 11 @ Rod Laver Arena
11. 15,129 Melbourne vs South East Melbourne 11/07/1994 Round 14 @ Rod Laver Arena
12. 15,122 Melbourne vs North Melbourne 23/09/1994 Round 22 @ Rod Laver Arena
13. 15,099 Melbourne vs Sydney 23/07/1994 Round 16 @ Rod Laver Arena
14. 15,064 Melbourne vs South East Melbourne 01/11/1996 Grand Final G2 @ Rod Laver Arena
15. 15,049 Melbourne vs South East Melbourne 24/10/1992 Grand Final G1 @ Rod Laver Arena
16. 15,034 South East Melbourne vs Melbourne 30/10/1992 Grand Final G2 @ Rod Laver Arena
17. 15,028 Melbourne vs Perth 23/10/1993 Grand Final G1 @ Rod Laver Arena

=== Largest home attendances ===
Current (2025-26 NBL season) teams only. Note, Melbourne United also incorporates the Melbourne Tigers.

- Sydney Kings – 18,373, 29 March 2026 vs Adelaide 36ers @ Qudos Bank Arena
- Melbourne United – 15,129, 11 July 1994 vs South East Melbourne Magic @ National Tennis Centre
- Perth Wildcats – 13,661, 7 December 2025 vs Adelaide 36ers @ RAC Arena
- Brisbane Bullets – 13,221, 26 October 1990, NBL Grand Final game 2 vs Perth Wildcats @ Brisbane Entertainment Centre
- South East Melbourne Phoenix – 10,175, 21 December 2024 vs Melbourne United @ John Cain Arena
- Adelaide 36ers – 10,068, 1 April 2026 vs Sydney Kings @ Adelaide Entertainment Centre
- New Zealand Breakers – 9,330, 7 April 2012, NBL Grand Final game 1 vs Perth Wildcats @ Vector Arena
- Illawarra Hawks – 5,839, 18 February 2005 vs Sydney Kings at WIN Entertainment Centre
- Cairns Taipans – 5,500, 3 March 2004 vs Perth Wildcats @ Cairns Convention Centre
- Tasmania JackJumpers – 4,865, 23 April 2022 vs Melbourne United @ MyState Bank Arena

== See also ==
- List of National Basketball League (Australia) annual scoring leaders
