= Wayne McDaniel =

American former professional basketball player

Personal information
- Born: October 8, 1960 (age 65) San Francisco, California, U.S.
- Listed height: 6 ft 6 in (1.98 m)
- Listed weight: 229 lb (104 kg)

Career information
- College: CC of San Francisco; Cal State Bakersfield (1980–1982)
- NBA draft: 1982: undrafted
- Playing career: 1983–1994

Career history
- 1983: Adelaide 36ers
- 1984–1985: Geelong Supercats
- 1986–1988: Newcastle Falcons
- 1989–1994: Hobart Devils

Career highlights
- 4× NBL All-Star (1988–1991); 2× All-NBL Second Team (1988, 1989)

Wayne McDaniel (born October 8, 1960) is an American former professional basketball player. He spent much of his career in the Australian National Basketball League (NBL), playing 288 games from 1983 to 1994. He scored over 7,600 points in his career at an average of 26.5 points per game over twelve seasons with 4 teams. He was a four-time NBL All-Star.

Born in San Francisco, California, McDaniel played college basketball for the Cal State Bakersfield Roadrunners from 1980 to 1982. He played professionally for the Adelaide 36ers (1983), Geelong Supercats (1984–1985), Newcastle Falcons (1986–1988) and Hobart Devils (1989–1994) of the NBL. Setting many single-game and single-season records, he retired in 1995.

As of the 2013–14 NBL season, Wayne McDaniel sits 3rd on the NBL's highest career points average with 26.5 per game, 3rd in career 40+ point games (22), 2nd in career 30+ point season averages (4), 9th in field goals made in a single game (24 vs Adelaide 36ers in 1989), and 10th in most points in a single game with 57 vs Adelaide in 1989.

McDaniel has also appeared in films such as Son of the Mask (2005) and Superman Returns (2006) and The Sapphires (2012). In November, 2014, McDaniel appeared in the world premiere production of the rock musical, The Island of Doctor Moron, playing the role of Brother Bob.

In recent years, McDaniel has remained active in the basketball community, contributing to youth development and grassroots programs. He has regularly led school holiday basketball camps at The Rec Club in Miranda, New South Wales, where he shares his expertise and passion for the game with aspiring young athletes.

== Personal life ==
McDaniel's son, Sam McDaniel, is a professional basketball player.

== See also ==
- NBL (Australia) All-time Records
