= The Island of Doctor Moron =

Rock musical by Chris Dockrill and Lyn Dockrill

The Island of Doctor Moron is a rock musical written by Chris Dockrill, with music by his wife Lyn Dockrill.

== Production ==
The original version of the musical was performed at Kempsey High School, where Chris Dockrill had previously taught, in 1998, but a refined version of the show had its official world premiere at The New Olympia Theatre in Paddington, New South Wales on 4 November 2014. The theatre was previously the long-deserted Palace Academy Twin Cinema, which the Dockrills bought, refurbished, and renamed in deference to its original 1919 name. The season ran from 4 November to 6 December 2014, with the show's popularity growing to sell-out performances in the 250-seat theatre over the final two weeks.

=== Musicians ===
The musicians for the world premiere production of The Island of Doctor Moron were: Kelly Bryant - Backing Vocalist Jane Eller - Backing Vocalist Lyn Dockrill - Backing Vocalist Paul Robert Burton - Acoustic Bass, Guitarlele Michael Hawke - Soprano, Alto, Tenor Sax/flute, harmonica Andrew Toner - acoustic/electric guitars Andrew Byrnes - drums Craig Morrison – percussion

=== Production Team ===
The production team of the world premiere production of The Island of Doctor Moron were: Executive Producer – Chris Dockrill Executive Musical Director - Lyn Dockrill Musical Director - Paul Robert Burton Production manager - Luke Dockrill Art and Design Director - Chris Austin Audio Engineer - Phil "Kez" Kesby Choreographer - David Camm Lighting Designer – Billy Mawer

== Recordings ==
A CD live cast recording of all songs in the show was produced in October–November, 2014

The Band consisted of: Andrew Toner - acoustic/electric guitars Andrew Byrnes - drums Craig Morrison - percussion Paul Robert Burton – Acoustic Bass, guitarlele and harmonica Michael Hawke – Soprano, Alto, Tenor Sax/flute, harmonica Lead vocalists: Lyndell Arthur, James Berkley, Cramer Cain, Jess D’Souza, James Jonathon, Bree Langridge, Nana Matapule, Wayne McDaniel, Amanda Stella Webb Backing vocalists: Kelly Bryant, Lyn Dockrill, Jane Eller

Disc 1 (Songs from Act 1):

1. Overture

2. Stranded – Lyndell Arthur

3. Valma's Drums

4. Mission Statement – Lead Vocals: Wayne McDaniel

5. What'd I Do? – Lead Vocals: Bree Langridge

6. Voodoo Zydecoo – Lead Vocals: Cramer Cain

7. Jungle Fever – Lead Vocals: Bree Langridge

8. Slave Market Junkie – Lead Vocals: James Jonathon

9. Moron Rules OK – Lead Vocals: James Berkley Harrison III

10. It Ain’t Easy Bein’ a Voodoo Queen – Lead Vocals: Bree Langridge

11. Doctor's Orders – Lead Vocals: Lyndell Arthur

Disc 2 (Songs from Act 2)

1. Reprise

2. House of Pain – Lead Vocals: Jessica D’Souza

3. Gaol House Blues – Lead Vocals: Amanda Stella Webb

4. Genetic Mutation – Vocals: James Berkley Harrison III, Lyndell Arthur, Nick Jones, Nana Matapule, Amanda Stella Webb and Jessica D’Souza

5. Pull of the Tide – Lead Vocals: Amanda Stella Webb

6. Animal Nights – Lead Vocals: James Jonathon

7. Reversion Blues – Lead Vocals: Nana Matapule

8. The Way I Feel For You – Lead Vocals: Amanda Stella Webb

9. Swamp Boogie - Lead Vocals: Wayne McDaniel

10. You Bring Out The Beast in Me – Lead Vocals: Amanda Stella Webb, Wayne McDaniel, Jessica D’Souza, Bree Langridge, Steve Maresca and James Berkley Harrison III

== Synopsis ==
A raging storm at sea surrounds the audience, who follow the adventures of Edwyna and Douggie. The two are shipwrecked and befall multiple misfortunes, eventually ending up in the cave of Doctor Moron. There, they are mauled, cajoled, and played with by the doctor's strange experiments: mutated half-animal-half-human creatures. All narrative threads ultimately lead to Doctor Moron, his devoted woman, Mona, and his maniacal quest to unleash the beast in all humans.

== Cast ==
The cast of the world premiere production of The Island of Doctor Moron were :

- James Berkley Harrison III - Doctor Moron
- Bree Langridge - Voodoo Valma
- Cramer Cain - Balthasar
- Lyndell Arthur - Eddie
- Steve Maresca - Douggie
- Amanda Webb - Mona
- Andrew Mead - Schnapps
- Wayne McDaniels - Brother Bob
- James Johnathon - Rubber Gloves
- Jess D'Souza - Cheetah
- Nana Matapule - Kong
- Tim Victory - Fitter
- Jimmy Chapman - Turner
- Nick Jones - Steele/Testosterone
- David Camm - Three Dogs/Jekyll
- Jenna Kratzael - Two Dogs
- Katerine Munro - Humbug
- Dance Ensemble: Catherine Bolitho, Nicole Harring, Amy Gill, Rosemarie Romeo, Sophie Campbell, Tanika Layt, Chris Hains, Lukas Rose, Steve Williams

== Reception ==
An early review of a technical rehearsal, published three days prior to the opening of the show to the public was negative – "Not quite the next Rocky Horror", however subsequent media responses based on the actual performances before paying audiences were all positive. The script and playing time was reduced by 22 minutes prior to opening night and production was tightened in the first week of the season.

The show went on to receive positive responses from many sources, including from Alan Jones, Alternative Media Group of Australia, Australian Musician Magazine, Canterbury Torch, the Central Coast Express, Central Sydney Magazine, the Daily Telegraph, Macleay Argus, Time Out Australia, St George and Sutherland Shire Leader, and the Wentworth Courier.
