= List of NBA career scoring leaders =

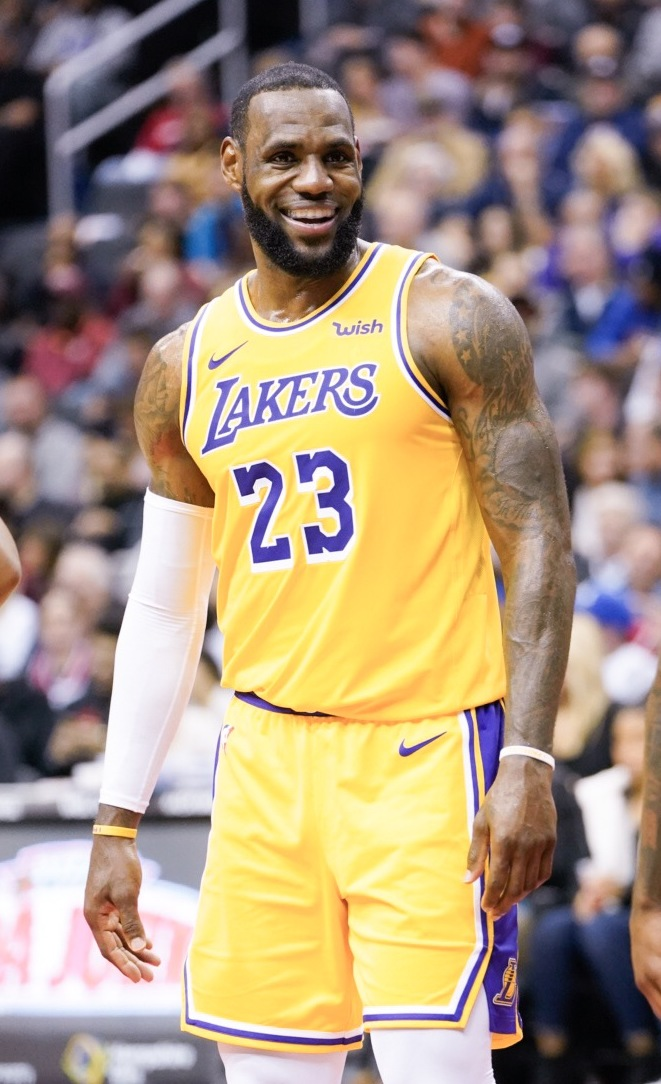
LeBron James has scored the most career regular season points in NBA history.

This article contains two charts:

The first chart is a list of the top 50 all-time scorers in the history of the National Basketball Association (NBA).

The second chart is a progressive list of the leading all-time NBA scorers.

The list includes only points scored in regular season games.

== Scoring leaders ==
The following is a list of the top 50 National Basketball Association players by total career regular season points scored.

Statistics accurate as of November 20, 2026.

^	Active NBA player
*	Inducted into the Naismith Memorial Basketball Hall of Fame
†	Not yet eligible for Hall of Fame consideration (Note: A player is not eligible for induction into the Naismith Memorial Basketball Hall of Fame until he has been fully retired for two calendar years.)

Rank	Player	Pos	Team(s) played for (years) (Note: American Basketball Association (ABA) teams other than those admitted into the NBA in 1976 are not included; each year is linked to an article about that particular NBA season.)	Total points	Games played	Points per game (Note: Rounded to the nearest tenth.)	Field goals made	Three-point field goals made (Note: First adopted in the 1979–80 NBA season.)	Free throws made
1	LeBron James^	SF	Cleveland Cavaliers (2003–2010, 2014–2018); Miami Heat (2010–2014); Los Angeles Lakers (2018–2026); Philadelphia 76ers (2026–present)	43,628	1,634	26.7	16,031	2,646	8,920
2	Kareem Abdul-Jabbar*	C	Milwaukee Bucks (1969–1975); Los Angeles Lakers (1975–1989)	38,387	1,560	24.6	15,837	1	6,712
3	Karl Malone*	PF	Utah Jazz (1985–2003); Los Angeles Lakers (2003–2004)	36,928	1,476	25.0	13,528	85	9,787
4	Kobe Bryant*	SG	Los Angeles Lakers (1996–2016)	33,643	1,346	25.0	11,719	1,827	8,378
5	Kevin Durant^	SF/PF	Seattle SuperSonics/Oklahoma City Thunder (2007–2016); Golden State Warriors (2016–2019); Brooklyn Nets (2019–2023); Phoenix Suns (2023–2025); Houston Rockets (2025–present)	32,954	1,218	27.1	11,370	2,403	7,811
6	Michael Jordan*	SG	Chicago Bulls (1984–1993, 1995–1998); Washington Wizards (2001–2003)	32,292	1,072	30.1	12,192	581	7,327
7	Dirk Nowitzki*	PF	Dallas Mavericks (1998–2019)	31,560	1,522	20.7	11,169	1,982	7,240
8	Wilt Chamberlain*	C	Philadelphia/San Francisco Warriors (1959–1965); Philadelphia 76ers (1965–1968); Los Angeles Lakers (1968–1973)	31,419	1,045	30.1	12,681	n/a	6,057
9	James Harden^	SG/PG	Oklahoma City Thunder (2009–2012); Houston Rockets (2012–2021); Brooklyn Nets (2021–2022); Philadelphia 76ers (2022–2023); Los Angeles Clippers (2023–2026); Cleveland Cavaliers (2026–present)	29,633	1,237	24.0	8,745	3,436	8,707
10	Shaquille O'Neal*	C	Orlando Magic (1992–1996); Los Angeles Lakers (1996–2004); Miami Heat (2004–2008); Phoenix Suns (2008–2009); Cleveland Cavaliers (2009–2010); Boston Celtics (2010–2011)	28,596	1,207	23.7	11,330	1	5,935
11	Carmelo Anthony*	SF	Denver Nuggets (2003–2011); New York Knicks (2011–2017); Oklahoma City Thunder (2017–2018); Houston Rockets (2018–2019); Portland Trail Blazers (2019–2021); Los Angeles Lakers (2021–2022)	28,289	1,260	22.5	10,119	1,731	6,320
12	Moses Malone*	C	Buffalo Braves (1976); Houston Rockets (1976–1982); Philadelphia 76ers (1982–1986, 1993–1994); Washington Bullets (1986–1988); Atlanta Hawks (1988–1991); Milwaukee Bucks (1991–1993); San Antonio Spurs (1994–1995)	27,409	1,329	20.6	9,435	8	8,531
13	Elvin Hayes*	PF/C	San Diego/Houston Rockets (1968–1972, 1981–1984); Baltimore/Capital/Washington Bullets (1972–1981)	27,313	1,303	21.0	10,976	5	5,356
14	Russell Westbrook^{†}	PG	Oklahoma City Thunder (2008–2019); Houston Rockets (2019–2020); Washington Wizards (2020–2021); Los Angeles Lakers (2021–2023); Los Angeles Clippers (2023–2024); Denver Nuggets (2024–2025); Sacramento Kings (2025–2026)	27,176	1,301	20.9	9,786	1,495	6,109
15	Hakeem Olajuwon*	C	Houston Rockets (1984–2001); Toronto Raptors (2001–2002)	26,946	1,238	21.8	10,749	25	5,423
16	DeMar DeRozan^	SG/SF	Toronto Raptors (2009–2018); San Antonio Spurs (2018–2021); Chicago Bulls (2021–2024); Sacramento Kings (2024–2026); Denver Nuggets (2026–present)	26,845	1,277	21.0	9,608	665	6,964
17	Stephen Curry^	PG	Golden State Warriors (2009–present)	26,806	1,079	24.8	9,102	4,291	4,311
18	Oscar Robertson*	PG	Cincinnati Royals (1960–1970); Milwaukee Bucks (1970–1974)	26,710	1,040	25.7	9,508	n/a	7,694
19	Dominique Wilkins*	SF	Atlanta Hawks (1982–1994); Los Angeles Clippers (1994); Boston Celtics (1994–1995); San Antonio Spurs (1996–1997); Orlando Magic (1999)	26,668	1,074	24.8	9,963	711	6,031
20	Tim Duncan*	PF/C	San Antonio Spurs (1997–2016)	26,496	1,392	19.0	10,285	30	5,896
21	Paul Pierce*	SF/SG	Boston Celtics (1998–2013); Brooklyn Nets (2013–2014); Washington Wizards (2014–2015); Los Angeles Clippers (2015–2017)	26,397	1,343	19.7	8,668	2,143	6,918
22	John Havlicek*	SF/SG	Boston Celtics (1962–1978)	26,395	1,270	20.8	10,513	n/a	5,369
23	Kevin Garnett*	PF	Minnesota Timberwolves (1995–2007, 2015–2016); Boston Celtics (2007–2013); Brooklyn Nets (2013–2015)	26,071	1,462	17.8	10,505	174	4,887
24	Vince Carter*	SG/SF	Toronto Raptors (1998–2004); New Jersey Nets (2004–2009); Orlando Magic (2009–2010); Phoenix Suns (2010–2011); Dallas Mavericks (2011–2014); Memphis Grizzlies (2014–2017); Sacramento Kings (2017–2018); Atlanta Hawks (2018–2020)	25,728	1,541	16.7	9,293	2,290	4,852
25	Alex English*	SF	Milwaukee Bucks (1976–1978); Indiana Pacers (1978–1980); Denver Nuggets (1980–1990); Dallas Mavericks (1990–1991)	25,613	1,193	21.5	10,659	18	4,277
26	Reggie Miller*	SG	Indiana Pacers (1987–2005)	25,279	1,389	18.2	8,241	2,560	6,237
27	Jerry West*	PG/SG	Los Angeles Lakers (1960–1974)	25,192	932	27.0	9,016	n/a	7,160
28	Patrick Ewing*	C	New York Knicks (1985–2000); Seattle SuperSonics (2000–2001); Orlando Magic (2001–2002)	24,815	1,183	21.0	9,702	19	5,392
29	Ray Allen*	SG	Milwaukee Bucks (1996–2003); Seattle SuperSonics (2003–2007); Boston Celtics (2007–2012); Miami Heat (2012–2014)	24,505	1,300	18.9	8,567	2,973	4,398
30	Allen Iverson*	SG/PG	Philadelphia 76ers (1996–2006, 2009–2010); Denver Nuggets (2006–2008); Detroit Pistons (2008–2009); Memphis Grizzlies (2009)	24,368	914	26.7	8,467	1,059	6,375
31	Charles Barkley*	PF	Philadelphia 76ers (1984–1992); Phoenix Suns (1992–1996); Houston Rockets (1996–2000)	23,757	1,073	22.1	8,435	538	6,349
32	Robert Parish*	C	Golden State Warriors (1976–1980); Boston Celtics (1980–1994); Charlotte Hornets (1994–1996); Chicago Bulls (1996–1997)	23,334	1,611	14.5	9,614	0	4,106
33	Adrian Dantley*	SF	Buffalo Braves (1976–1977); Indiana Pacers (1977); Los Angeles Lakers (1977–1979); Utah Jazz (1979–1986); Detroit Pistons (1986–1989); Dallas Mavericks (1989–1990); Milwaukee Bucks (1991)	23,177	955	24.3	8,169	7	6,832
34	Dwyane Wade*	SG	Miami Heat (2003–2016, 2018–2019); Chicago Bulls (2016–2017); Cleveland Cavaliers (2017–2018)	23,165	1,054	22.0	8,454	549	5,708
35	Elgin Baylor*	SF	Minneapolis/Los Angeles Lakers (1958–1971)	23,149	846	27.4	8,693	n/a	5,763
36	Chris Paul^{†}	PG	New Orleans Hornets (2005–2011); Los Angeles Clippers (2011–2017, 2025–2026); Houston Rockets (2017–2019); Oklahoma City Thunder (2019–2020); Phoenix Suns (2020–2023); Golden State Warriors (2023–2024); San Antonio Spurs (2024–2025)	23,058	1,370	16.8	8,165	1,870	4,858
37	Damian Lillard^	PG	Portland Trail Blazers (2012–2023, 2026–present); Milwaukee Bucks (2023–2025)	22,912	915	25.0	7,356	2,853	5,347
38	Clyde Drexler*	SG	Portland Trail Blazers (1983–1995); Houston Rockets (1995–1998)	22,195	1,086	20.4	8,335	827	4,698
39	Giannis Antetokounmpo^	PF	Milwaukee Bucks (2013–2026); Miami Heat (2026–present)	21,954	910	24.1	8,060	565	5,269
40	Gary Payton*	PG	Seattle SuperSonics (1990–2003); Milwaukee Bucks (2003); Los Angeles Lakers (2003–2004); Boston Celtics (2004–2005); Miami Heat (2005–2007)	21,813	1,335	16.3	8,708	1,132	3,265
41	Larry Bird*	SF/PF	Boston Celtics (1979–1992)	21,791	897	24.3	8,591	649	3,960
42	Hal Greer*	SG/PG	Syracuse Nationals/Philadelphia 76ers (1958–1973)	21,586	1,122	19.2	8,504	n/a	4,578
43	Walt Bellamy*	C	Chicago Packers/Zephyrs/Baltimore Bullets (1961–1965); New York Knicks (1965–1968); Detroit Pistons (1968–1970); Atlanta Hawks (1970–1974); New Orleans Jazz (1974)	20,941	1,043	20.1	7,914	n/a	5,113
44	Pau Gasol*	PF/C	Memphis Grizzlies (2001–2008); Los Angeles Lakers (2008–2014); Chicago Bulls (2014–2016); San Antonio Spurs (2016–2019); Milwaukee Bucks (2019)	20,894	1,226	17.0	7,980	179	4,755
45	Bob Pettit*	PF/C	Milwaukee/St. Louis Hawks (1954–1965)	20,880	792	26.4	7,349	n/a	6,182
46	David Robinson*	C	San Antonio Spurs (1989–2003)	20,790	987	21.1	7,365	25	6,035
47	George Gervin*	SG/SF	San Antonio Spurs (1976–1985); Chicago Bulls (1985–1986)	20,708	791	26.2	8,045	77	4,541
48	LaMarcus Aldridge	PF/C	Portland Trail Blazers (2006–2015); San Antonio Spurs (2015–2021); Brooklyn Nets (2021–2022)	20,558	1,076	19.1	8,311	227	3,709
49	Mitch Richmond*	SG	Golden State Warriors (1988–1991); Sacramento Kings (1991–1998); Washington Wizards (1998–2001); Los Angeles Lakers (2001–2002)	20,497	976	21.0	7,305	1,326	4,561
50	Joe Johnson	SG/SF	Boston Celtics (2001–2002, 2021–2022); Phoenix Suns (2002–2005); Atlanta Hawks (2005–2012); Brooklyn Nets (2012–2016); Miami Heat (2016); Utah Jazz (2016–2018); Houston Rockets (2018)	20,407	1,277	16.0	7,823	1,978	2,783

== Progressive list of scoring leaders ==
This is a progressive list of scoring leaders showing how the record increased through the years.

Progression of career scoring leaders

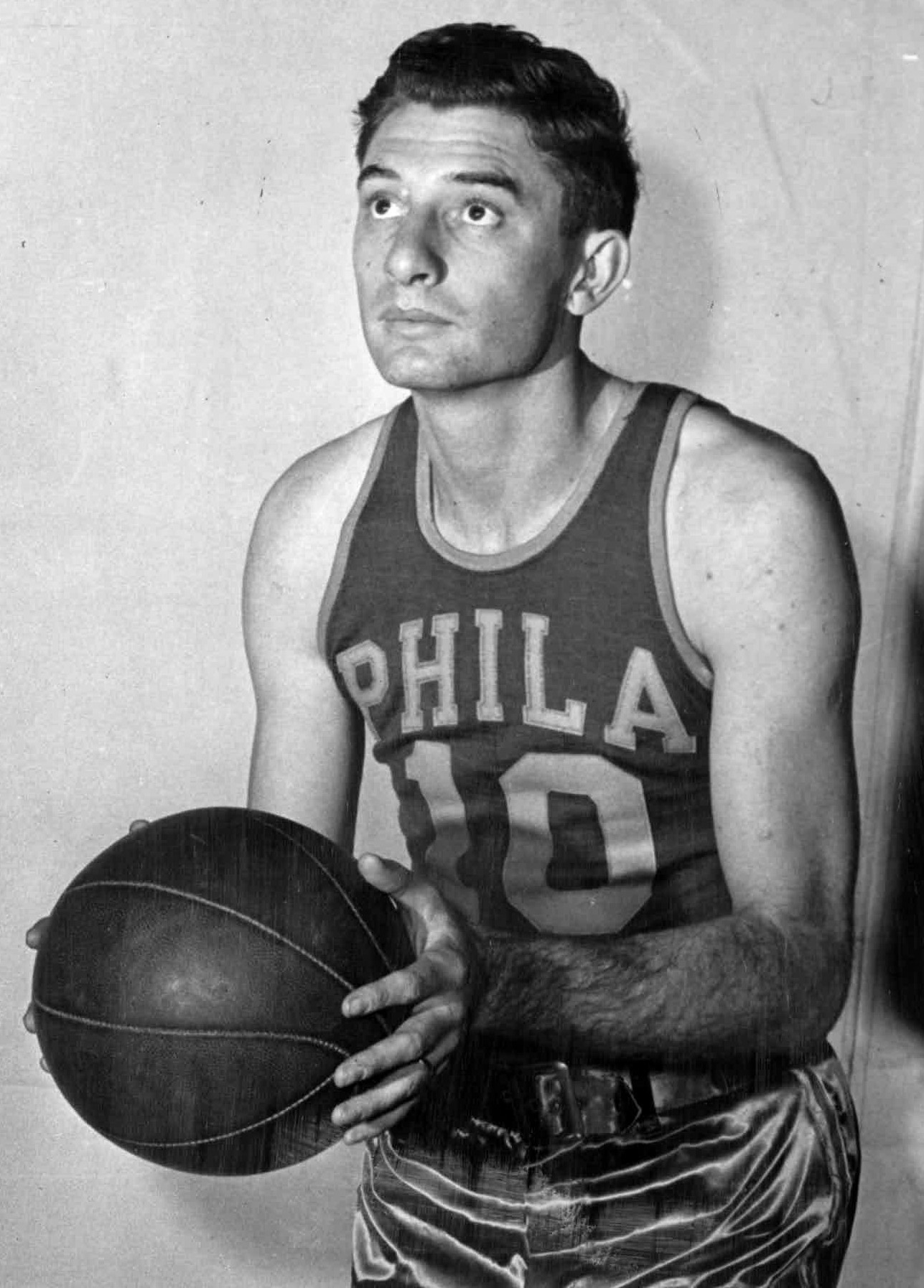
Joe Fulks held the career scoring record from the league's inaugural season in 1946 to 1952 and was the first player to eclipse 5,000 career points.

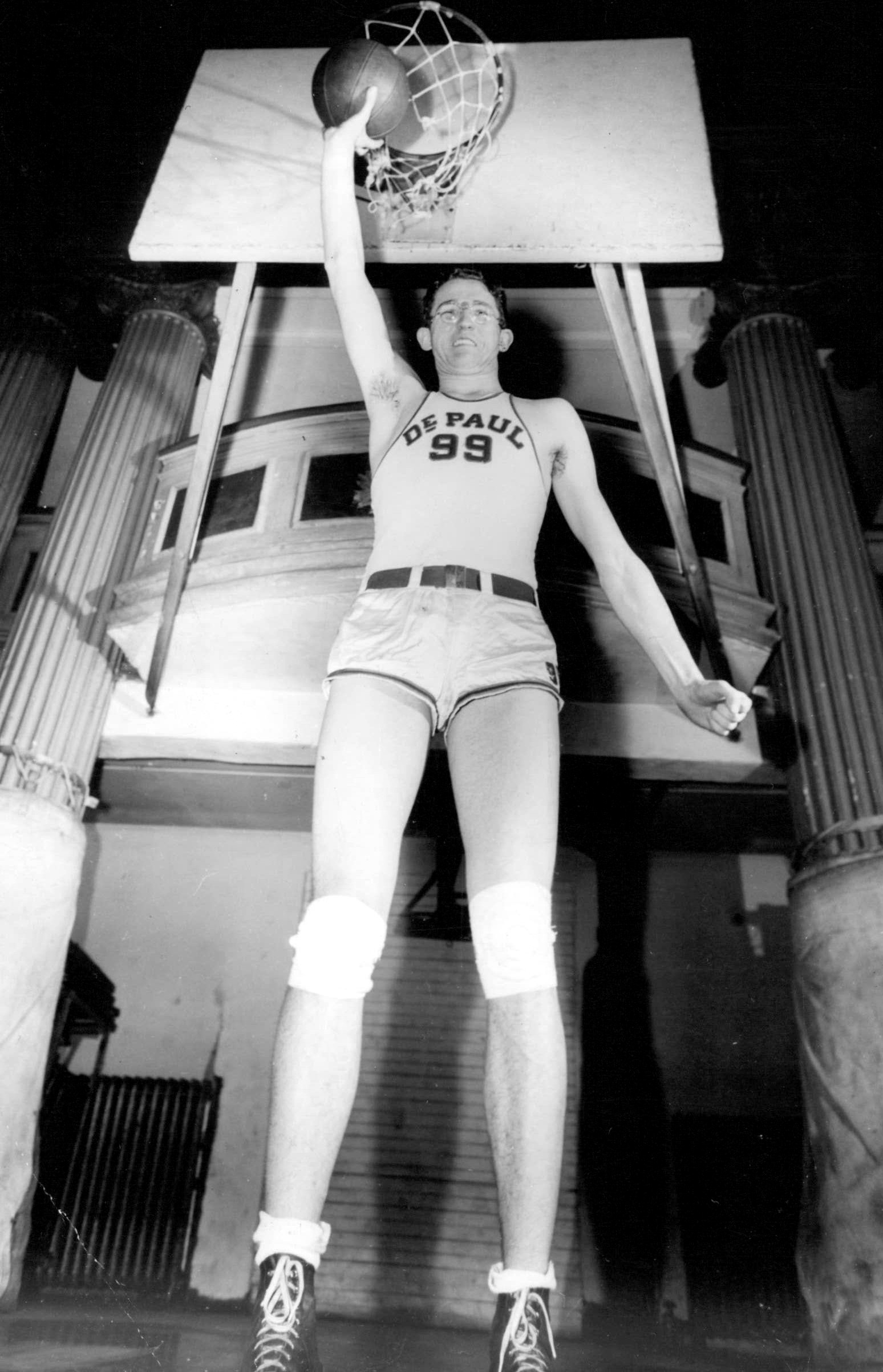
George Mikan held the record from 1952 to 1958 and was the first player to eclipse 10,000 career points.

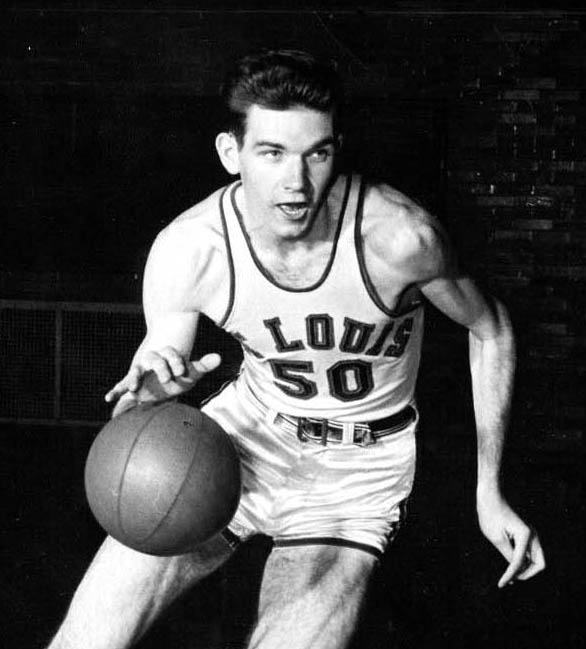
Ed Macauley held the record for 39 days in 1958, the shortest in NBA history.

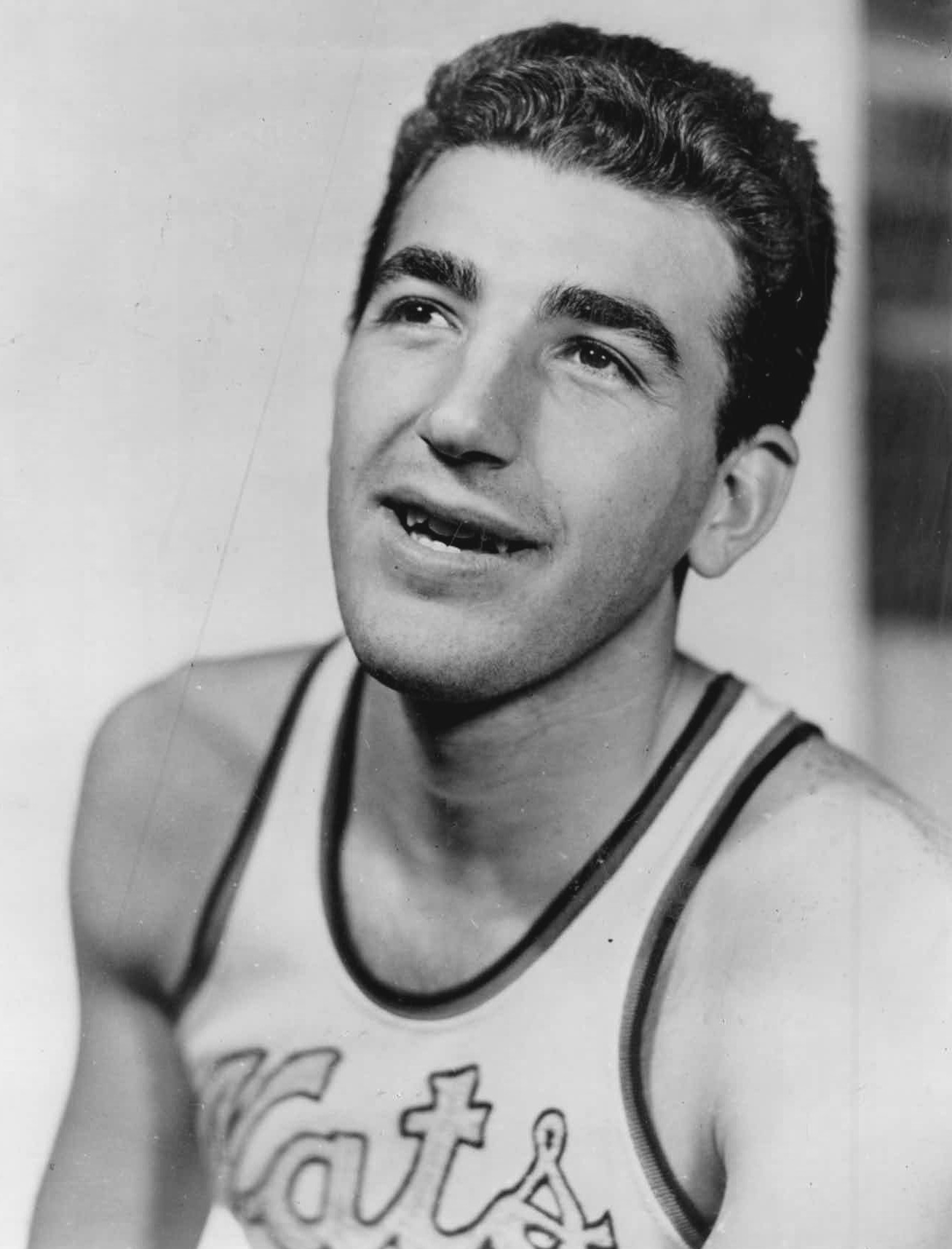
Dolph Schayes held the record from 1958 to 1964 and was the first player to eclipse 15,000 career points.

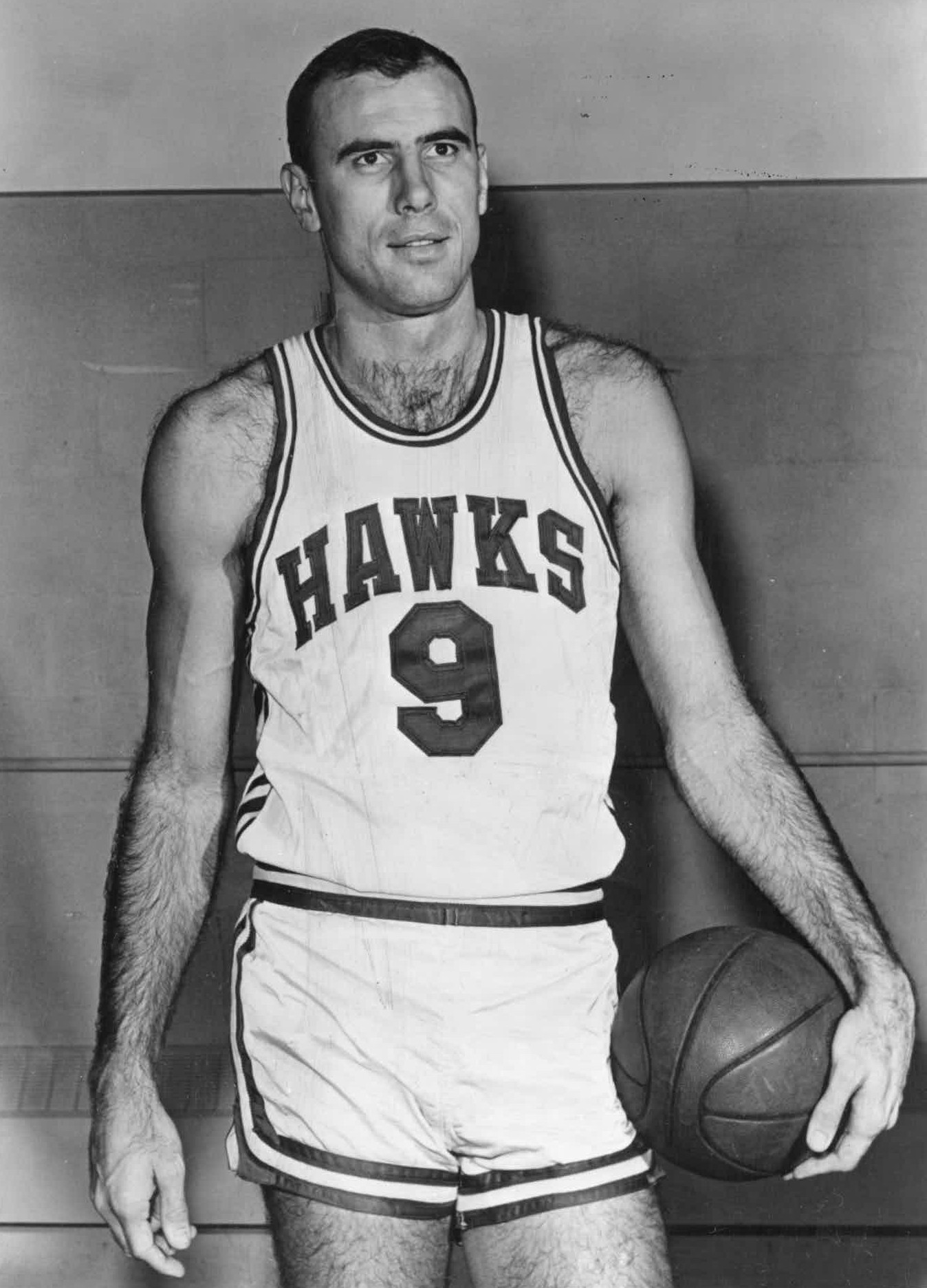
Bob Pettit held the record from 1964 to 1966 and is the first player to eclipse 20,000 career points.

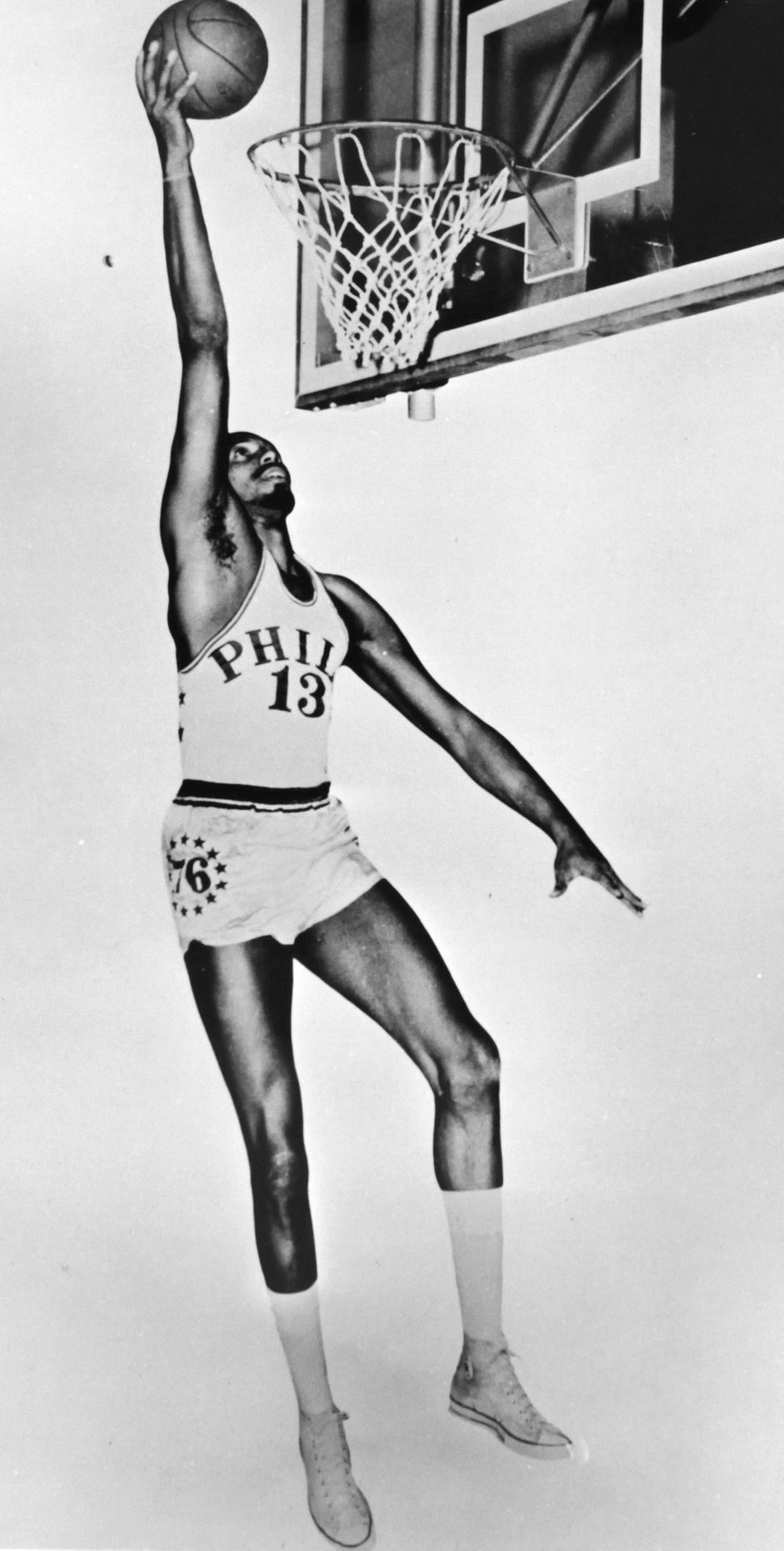
Wilt Chamberlain held the record from 1966 to 1984 and was the first player to eclipse 25,000 and 30,000 career points. He played the fewest games to reach every point milestone from 1,000 to 31,000 in NBA history.

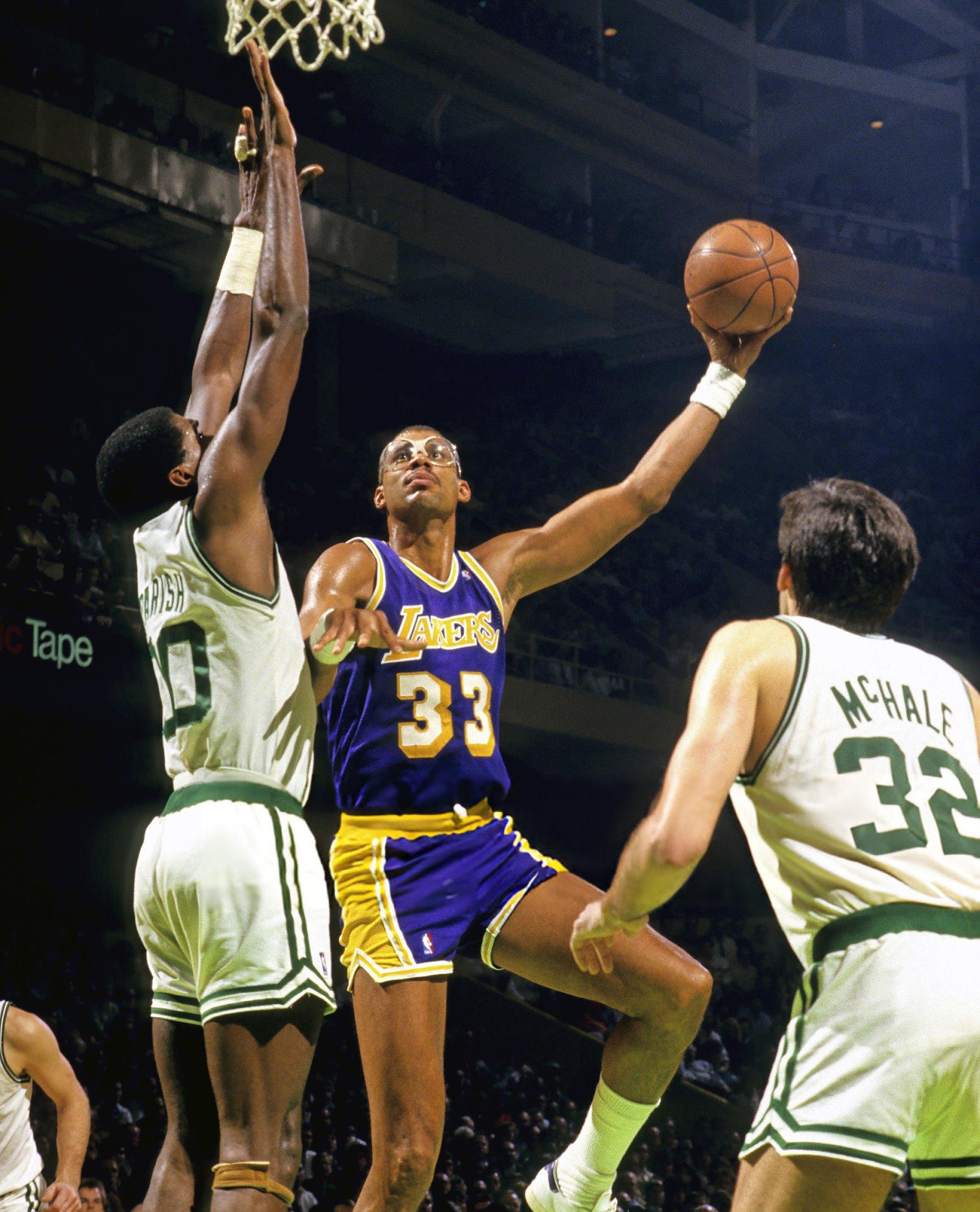
Kareem Abdul-Jabbar held the record for 38 years, 10 months, and 2 days (14,187 days) from 1984 to 2023, the longest in NBA history. He is the first player to eclipse 35,000 career points.

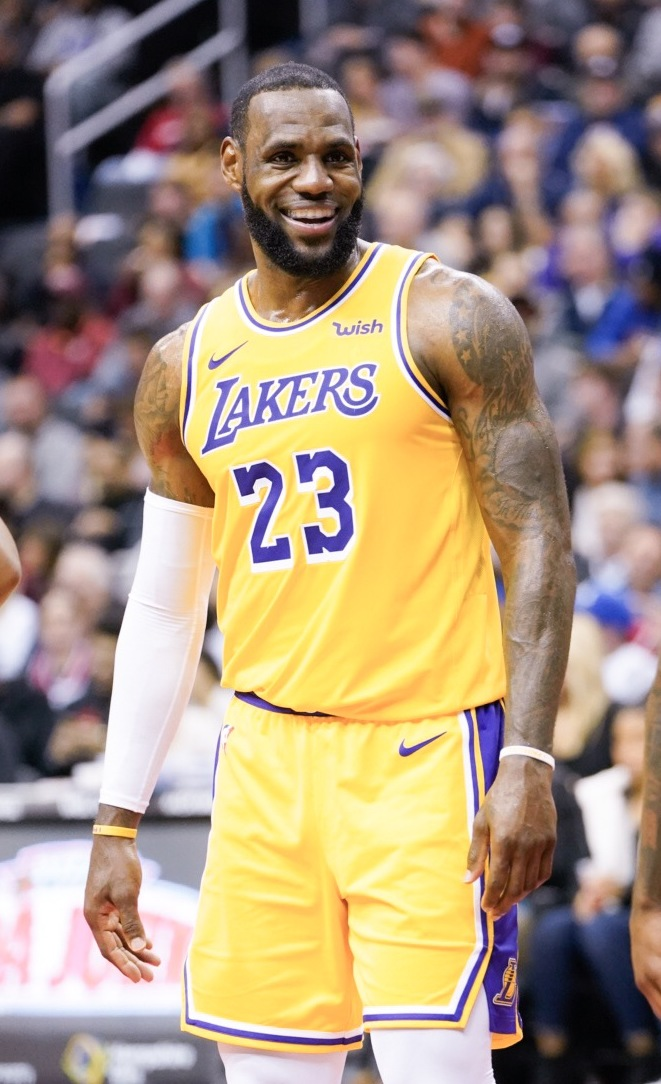
LeBron James has held the record since 2023. He is the first player to eclipse 40,000 career points.

Statistics accurate as of November 20, 2026.

^	Active NBA player
*	Inducted into the Naismith Memorial Basketball Hall of Fame
†	Not yet eligible for Hall of Fame consideration (Note: A player is not eligible for induction into the Naismith Memorial Basketball Hall of Fame until he has been fully retired for two calendar years.)

Team abbreviationsTeam(s) listed is the one player was on when he established the record.
ATL	Atlanta Hawks	DET	Detroit Pistons	MIL	Milwaukee Bucks	PHW	Philadelphia Warriors
BOS	Boston Celtics	FTW	Fort Wayne Pistons	MIN	Minnesota Timberwolves	PHX	Phoenix Suns
BUF	Buffalo Braves	GSW	Golden State Warriors	MNL	Minneapolis Lakers	SAS	San Antonio Spurs
CHI	Chicago Bulls	HOU	Houston Rockets	NOJ	New Orleans Jazz	SDR	San Diego Rockets
CHS	Chicago Stags	IND	Indiana Pacers	NOP	New Orleans Pelicans	SFW	San Francisco Warriors
CLE	Cleveland Cavaliers	KCO	Kansas City-Omaha Kings	OKC	Oklahoma City Thunder	STL	St. Louis Hawks
DAL	Dallas Mavericks	LAL	Los Angeles Lakers	ORL	Orlando Magic	SYR	Syracuse Nationals
DEN	Denver Nuggets	MIA	Miami Heat	PHI	Philadelphia 76ers	UTA	Utah Jazz

Scoring leader at the end of every season
Season	Year-by-year leader	Points	Active player leader	Total points	Career record	Total points	Single-season record	Points	Season
1946–47	Joe Fulks*PHW	1,389	Joe Fulks*PHW	1,389	Joe Fulks*PHW	1,389	Joe Fulks*PHW	1,389	1946–47
1947–48	Max ZaslofskyCHS	1,007	Joe Fulks*PHW	2,338	Joe Fulks*PHW	2,338	Joe Fulks*PHW	1,389	1947–48
1948–49	George Mikan*MNL	1,698	Joe Fulks*PHW	3,898	Joe Fulks*PHW	3,898	George Mikan*MNL	1,698	1948–49
1949–50	George Mikan*MNL	1,865	Joe Fulks*PHW	4,863	Joe Fulks*PHW	4,863	George Mikan*MNL	1,865	1949–50
1950–51	George Mikan*MNL	1,932	Joe Fulks*PHW	6,099	Joe Fulks*PHW	6,099	George Mikan*MNL	1,932	1950–51
1951–52	Paul Arizin*PHW	1,674	Joe Fulks*PHW	7,021	Joe Fulks*PHW	7,021	George Mikan*MNL	1,932	1951–52
1952–53	Neil Johnston*PHW	1,564	George Mikan*MNL	8,460	George Mikan*MNL	8,460	George Mikan*MNL	1,932	1952–53
1953–54	Neil Johnston*PHW	1,759	George Mikan*MNL	9,766	George Mikan*MNL	9,766	George Mikan*MNL	1,932	1953–54
1954–55	Neil Johnston*PHW	1,631	Max ZaslofskyFTW	7,902	George Mikan*MNL	9,766	George Mikan*MNL	1,932	1954–55
1955–56	Bob Pettit*STL	1,849	George Mikan*MNL	10,156	George Mikan*MNL	10,156	George Mikan*MNL	1,932	1955–56
1956–57	Paul Arizin*PHW	1,817	Ed Macauley*STL	10,150	George Mikan*MNL	10,156	George Mikan*MNL	1,932	1956–57
1957–58	George Yardley*DET	2,001	Dolph Schayes*SYR	11,764	Dolph Schayes*SYR	11,764	George Yardley*DET	2,001	1957–58
1958–59	Bob Pettit*STL	2,105	Dolph Schayes*SYR	13,298	Dolph Schayes*SYR	13,298	Bob Pettit*STL	2,105	1958–59
1959–60	Wilt Chamberlain*; PHW 1959–62; SFW 1962–65; PHI 1965–66	2,707	Dolph Schayes*SYR	14,987	Dolph Schayes*SYR	14,987	Wilt Chamberlain*PHW	2,707	1959–60
1960–61	Wilt Chamberlain*; PHW 1959–62; SFW 1962–65; PHI 1965–66	3,033	Dolph Schayes*SYR	16,855	Dolph Schayes*SYR	16,855	Wilt Chamberlain*PHW	3,033	1960–61
1961–62	Wilt Chamberlain*; PHW 1959–62; SFW 1962–65; PHI 1965–66	4,029	Dolph Schayes*SYR	17,677	Dolph Schayes*SYR	17,677	Wilt Chamberlain*PHW	4,029	1961–62
1962–63	Wilt Chamberlain*; PHW 1959–62; SFW 1962–65; PHI 1965–66	3,586	Dolph Schayes*SYR	18,304	Dolph Schayes*SYR	18,304	Wilt Chamberlain*PHW	4,029	1962–63
1963–64	Wilt Chamberlain*; PHW 1959–62; SFW 1962–65; PHI 1965–66	2,948	Bob Pettit*STL	19,756	Bob Pettit*STL	19,756	Wilt Chamberlain*PHW	4,029	1963–64
1964–65	Wilt Chamberlain*; PHW 1959–62; SFW 1962–65; PHI 1965–66	2,534	Bob Pettit*STL	20,880	Bob Pettit*STL	20,880	Wilt Chamberlain*PHW	4,029	1964–65
1965–66	Wilt Chamberlain*; PHW 1959–62; SFW 1962–65; PHI 1965–66	2,649	Wilt Chamberlain*; PHI 1965–68; LAL 1968–73	21,486	Wilt Chamberlain*; PHI 1965–68; LAL 1968–73	21,486	Wilt Chamberlain*PHW	4,029	1965–66
1966–67	Rick Barry*SFW	2,775	Wilt Chamberlain*; PHI 1965–68; LAL 1968–73	23,442	Wilt Chamberlain*; PHI 1965–68; LAL 1968–73	23,442	Wilt Chamberlain*PHW	4,029	1966–67
1967–68	Dave Bing*DET	2,142	Wilt Chamberlain*; PHI 1965–68; LAL 1968–73	25,434	Wilt Chamberlain*; PHI 1965–68; LAL 1968–73	25,434	Wilt Chamberlain*PHW	4,029	1967–68
1968–69	Elvin Hayes*SDR	2,327	Wilt Chamberlain*; PHI 1965–68; LAL 1968–73	27,098	Wilt Chamberlain*; PHI 1965–68; LAL 1968–73	27,098	Wilt Chamberlain*PHW	4,029	1968–69
1969–70	Kareem Abdul-Jabbar*MIL	2,361	Wilt Chamberlain*; PHI 1965–68; LAL 1968–73	27,426	Wilt Chamberlain*; PHI 1965–68; LAL 1968–73	27,426	Wilt Chamberlain*PHW	4,029	1969–70
1970–71	Kareem Abdul-Jabbar*MIL	2,596	Wilt Chamberlain*; PHI 1965–68; LAL 1968–73	29,122	Wilt Chamberlain*; PHI 1965–68; LAL 1968–73	29,122	Wilt Chamberlain*PHW	4,029	1970–71
1971–72	Kareem Abdul-Jabbar*MIL	2,822	Wilt Chamberlain*; PHI 1965–68; LAL 1968–73	30,335	Wilt Chamberlain*; PHI 1965–68; LAL 1968–73	30,335	Wilt Chamberlain*PHW	4,029	1971–72
1972–73	Nate Archibald*KCO	2,719	Wilt Chamberlain*; PHI 1965–68; LAL 1968–73	31,419	Wilt Chamberlain*; PHI 1965–68; LAL 1968–73	31,419	Wilt Chamberlain*PHW	4,029	1972–73
1973–74	Bob McAdoo*BUF	2,261	Oscar Robertson*MIL	26,710	Wilt Chamberlain*; PHI 1965–68; LAL 1968–73	31,419	Wilt Chamberlain*PHW	4,029	1973–74
1974–75	Bob McAdoo*BUF	2,831	John Havlicek*BOS	22,389	Wilt Chamberlain*; PHI 1965–68; LAL 1968–73	31,419	Wilt Chamberlain*PHW	4,029	1974–75
1975–76	Bob McAdoo*BUF	2,427	John Havlicek*BOS	23,678	Wilt Chamberlain*; PHI 1965–68; LAL 1968–73	31,419	Wilt Chamberlain*PHW	4,029	1975–76
1976–77	Pete Maravich*NOJ	2,273	John Havlicek*BOS	25,073	Wilt Chamberlain*; PHI 1965–68; LAL 1968–73	31,419	Wilt Chamberlain*PHW	4,029	1976–77
1977–78	George Gervin*SAS	2,232	John Havlicek*BOS	26,395	Wilt Chamberlain*; PHI 1965–68; LAL 1968–73	31,419	Wilt Chamberlain*PHW	4,029	1977–78
1978–79	George Gervin*SAS	2,365	Kareem Abdul-Jabbar*LAL	22,141	Wilt Chamberlain*; PHI 1965–68; LAL 1968–73	31,419	Wilt Chamberlain*PHW	4,029	1978–79
1979–80	George Gervin*SAS	2,585	Kareem Abdul-Jabbar*LAL	24,175	Wilt Chamberlain*; PHI 1965–68; LAL 1968–73	31,419	Wilt Chamberlain*PHW	4,029	1979–80
1980–81	Adrian Dantley*UTA	2,452	Kareem Abdul-Jabbar*LAL	26,270	Wilt Chamberlain*; PHI 1965–68; LAL 1968–73	31,419	Wilt Chamberlain*PHW	4,029	1980–81
1981–82	George Gervin*SAS	2,551	Kareem Abdul-Jabbar*LAL	28,088	Wilt Chamberlain*; PHI 1965–68; LAL 1968–73	31,419	Wilt Chamberlain*PHW	4,029	1981–82
1982–83	Alex English*DEN	2,326	Kareem Abdul-Jabbar*LAL	29,810	Wilt Chamberlain*; PHI 1965–68; LAL 1968–73	31,419	Wilt Chamberlain*PHW	4,029	1982–83
1983–84	Adrian Dantley*UTA	2,418	Kareem Abdul-Jabbar*LAL	31,527	Kareem Abdul-Jabbar*LAL	31,527	Wilt Chamberlain*PHW	4,029	1983–84
1984–85	Michael Jordan*CHI	2,313	Kareem Abdul-Jabbar*LAL	33,262	Kareem Abdul-Jabbar*LAL	33,262	Wilt Chamberlain*PHW	4,029	1984–85
1985–86	Alex English*DEN	2,414	Kareem Abdul-Jabbar*LAL	35,108	Kareem Abdul-Jabbar*LAL	35,108	Wilt Chamberlain*PHW	4,029	1985–86
1986–87	Michael Jordan*CHI	3,041	Kareem Abdul-Jabbar*LAL	36,474	Kareem Abdul-Jabbar*LAL	36,474	Wilt Chamberlain*PHW	4,029	1986–87
1987–88	Michael Jordan*CHI	2,868	Kareem Abdul-Jabbar*LAL	37,639	Kareem Abdul-Jabbar*LAL	37,639	Wilt Chamberlain*PHW	4,029	1987–88
1988–89	Michael Jordan*CHI	2,633	Kareem Abdul-Jabbar*LAL	38,387	Kareem Abdul-Jabbar*LAL	38,387	Wilt Chamberlain*PHW	4,029	1988–89
1989–90	Michael Jordan*CHI	2,753	Moses Malone*; ATL 1989–91; MIL 1991–93; PHI 1993–94; SAS 1994–95	24,868	Kareem Abdul-Jabbar*LAL	38,387	Wilt Chamberlain*PHW	4,029	1989–90
1990–91	Michael Jordan*CHI	2,580	Moses Malone*; ATL 1989–91; MIL 1991–93; PHI 1993–94; SAS 1994–95	25,737	Kareem Abdul-Jabbar*LAL	38,387	Wilt Chamberlain*PHW	4,029	1990–91
1991–92	Michael Jordan*CHI	2,404	Moses Malone*; ATL 1989–91; MIL 1991–93; PHI 1993–94; SAS 1994–95	27,016	Kareem Abdul-Jabbar*LAL	38,387	Wilt Chamberlain*PHW	4,029	1991–92
1992–93	Michael Jordan*CHI	2,541	Moses Malone*; ATL 1989–91; MIL 1991–93; PHI 1993–94; SAS 1994–95	27,066	Kareem Abdul-Jabbar*LAL	38,387	Wilt Chamberlain*PHW	4,029	1992–93
1993–94	David Robinson*SAS	2,383	Moses Malone*; ATL 1989–91; MIL 1991–93; PHI 1993–94; SAS 1994–95	27,360	Kareem Abdul-Jabbar*LAL	38,387	Wilt Chamberlain*PHW	4,029	1993–94
1994–95	Shaquille O'Neal*ORL	2,315	Moses Malone*; ATL 1989–91; MIL 1991–93; PHI 1993–94; SAS 1994–95	27,409	Kareem Abdul-Jabbar*LAL	38,387	Wilt Chamberlain*PHW	4,029	1994–95
1995–96	Michael Jordan*CHI	2,491	Michael Jordan*CHI	24,489	Kareem Abdul-Jabbar*LAL	38,387	Wilt Chamberlain*PHW	4,029	1995–96
1996–97	Michael Jordan*CHI	2,431	Michael Jordan*CHI	26,920	Kareem Abdul-Jabbar*LAL	38,387	Wilt Chamberlain*PHW	4,029	1996–97
1997–98	Michael Jordan*CHI	2,357	Michael Jordan*CHI	29,277	Kareem Abdul-Jabbar*LAL	38,387	Wilt Chamberlain*PHW	4,029	1997–98
1998–99	Shaquille O'Neal*LAL	1,289	Karl Malone*; UTA 1998–2003; LAL 2003–04	28,946	Kareem Abdul-Jabbar*LAL	38,387	Wilt Chamberlain*PHW	4,029	1998–99
1999–00	Shaquille O'Neal*LAL	2,344	Karl Malone*; UTA 1998–2003; LAL 2003–04	31,041	Kareem Abdul-Jabbar*LAL	38,387	Wilt Chamberlain*PHW	4,029	1999–00
2000–01	Jerry StackhouseDET	2,380	Karl Malone*; UTA 1998–2003; LAL 2003–04	32,919	Kareem Abdul-Jabbar*LAL	38,387	Wilt Chamberlain*PHW	4,029	2000–01
2001–02	Paul Pierce*BOS	2,144	Karl Malone*; UTA 1998–2003; LAL 2003–04	34,707	Kareem Abdul-Jabbar*LAL	38,387	Wilt Chamberlain*PHW	4,029	2001–02
2002–03	Kobe Bryant*LAL	2,461	Karl Malone*; UTA 1998–2003; LAL 2003–04	36,374	Kareem Abdul-Jabbar*LAL	38,387	Wilt Chamberlain*PHW	4,029	2002–03
2003–04	Kevin Garnett*MIN	1,987	Karl Malone*; UTA 1998–2003; LAL 2003–04	36,928	Kareem Abdul-Jabbar*LAL	38,387	Wilt Chamberlain*PHW	4,029	2003–04
2004–05	Allen Iverson*PHI	2,302	Reggie Miller*IND	25,279	Kareem Abdul-Jabbar*LAL	38,387	Wilt Chamberlain*PHW	4,029	2004–05
2005–06	Kobe Bryant*LAL	2,832	Shaquille O'Neal*; MIA 2005–08; PHX 2008–09; CLE 2009–10; BOS 2010–11	24,764	Kareem Abdul-Jabbar*LAL	38,387	Wilt Chamberlain*PHW	4,029	2005–06
2006–07	Kobe Bryant*LAL	2,430	Shaquille O'Neal*; MIA 2005–08; PHX 2008–09; CLE 2009–10; BOS 2010–11	25,454	Kareem Abdul-Jabbar*LAL	38,387	Wilt Chamberlain*PHW	4,029	2006–07
2007–08	Kobe Bryant*LAL	2,323	Shaquille O'Neal*; MIA 2005–08; PHX 2008–09; CLE 2009–10; BOS 2010–11	26,286	Kareem Abdul-Jabbar*LAL	38,387	Wilt Chamberlain*PHW	4,029	2007–08
2008–09	Dwyane Wade*MIA	2,386	Shaquille O'Neal*; MIA 2005–08; PHX 2008–09; CLE 2009–10; BOS 2010–11	27,619	Kareem Abdul-Jabbar*LAL	38,387	Wilt Chamberlain*PHW	4,029	2008–09
2009–10	Kevin Durant^OKC	2,472	Shaquille O'Neal*; MIA 2005–08; PHX 2008–09; CLE 2009–10; BOS 2010–11	28,255	Kareem Abdul-Jabbar*LAL	38,387	Wilt Chamberlain*PHW	4,029	2009–10
2010–11	Kevin Durant^OKC	2,161	Shaquille O'Neal*; MIA 2005–08; PHX 2008–09; CLE 2009–10; BOS 2010–11	28,596	Kareem Abdul-Jabbar*LAL	38,387	Wilt Chamberlain*PHW	4,029	2010–11
2011–12	Kevin Durant^OKC	1,850	Kobe Bryant*LAL	29,484	Kareem Abdul-Jabbar*LAL	38,387	Wilt Chamberlain*PHW	4,029	2011–12
2012–13	Kevin Durant^OKC	2,280	Kobe Bryant*LAL	31,617	Kareem Abdul-Jabbar*LAL	38,387	Wilt Chamberlain*PHW	4,029	2012–13
2013–14	Kevin Durant^OKC	2,593	Kobe Bryant*LAL	31,700	Kareem Abdul-Jabbar*LAL	38,387	Wilt Chamberlain*PHW	4,029	2013–14
2014–15	James Harden^HOU	2,217	Kobe Bryant*LAL	32,482	Kareem Abdul-Jabbar*LAL	38,387	Wilt Chamberlain*PHW	4,029	2014–15
2015–16	James Harden^HOU	2,376	Kobe Bryant*LAL	33,643	Kareem Abdul-Jabbar*LAL	38,387	Wilt Chamberlain*PHW	4,029	2015–16
2016–17	Russell Westbrook^{†}OKC	2,558	Dirk Nowitzki*DAL	30,260	Kareem Abdul-Jabbar*LAL	38,387	Wilt Chamberlain*PHW	4,029	2016–17
2017–18	LeBron James^CLE	2,251	Dirk Nowitzki*DAL	31,187	Kareem Abdul-Jabbar*LAL	38,387	Wilt Chamberlain*PHW	4,029	2017–18
2018–19	James Harden^HOU	2,818	LeBron James^ LAL 2018–26; PHI 2026–	32,543	Kareem Abdul-Jabbar*LAL	38,387	Wilt Chamberlain*PHW	4,029	2018–19
2019–20	James Harden^HOU	2,335	LeBron James^ LAL 2018–26; PHI 2026–	34,241	Kareem Abdul-Jabbar*LAL	38,387	Wilt Chamberlain*PHW	4,029	2019–20
2020–21	Stephen Curry^GSW	2,015	LeBron James^ LAL 2018–26; PHI 2026–	35,367	Kareem Abdul-Jabbar*LAL	38,387	Wilt Chamberlain*PHW	4,029	2020–21
2021–22	Trae Young^ATL	2,155	LeBron James^ LAL 2018–26; PHI 2026–	37,062	Kareem Abdul-Jabbar*LAL	38,387	Wilt Chamberlain*PHW	4,029	2021–22
2022–23	Jayson Tatum^BOS	2,225	LeBron James^ LAL 2018–26; PHI 2026–	38,652	LeBron James^ LAL 2022–26; PHI 2026–	38,652	Wilt Chamberlain*PHW	4,029	2022–23
2023–24	Luka Dončić^DAL	2,370	LeBron James^ LAL 2018–26; PHI 2026–	40,474	LeBron James^ LAL 2022–26; PHI 2026–	40,474	Wilt Chamberlain*PHW	4,029	2023–24
2024–25	Shai Gilgeous-Alexander^OKC	2,484	LeBron James^ LAL 2018–26; PHI 2026–	42,184	LeBron James^ LAL 2022–26; PHI 2026–	42,184	Wilt Chamberlain*PHW	4,029	2024–25
2025–26	Luka Dončić^LAL	2,143	LeBron James^ LAL 2018–26; PHI 2026–	43,440	LeBron James^ LAL 2022–26; PHI 2026–	43,440	Wilt Chamberlain*PHW	4,029	2025–26
2026–27	Luka Dončić^LAL	558	LeBron James^ LAL 2018–26; PHI 2026–	43,628	LeBron James^ LAL 2022–26; PHI 2026–	43,628	Wilt Chamberlain*PHW	4,029	2026–27
Season	Year-by-year leader	Points	Active player leader	Total points	Career record	Total points	Single-season record	Points	Season

== See also ==
- NBA records
- Point (basketball)
- List of NBA annual scoring leaders
- List of NBA career playoff scoring leaders
- List of NBA career 3-point scoring leaders
- List of National Basketball League (United States) scoring leaders
- List of NBA single-game scoring leaders
- List of NBA career minutes played leaders
- List of basketball players with most career points
