= Liga ACB Presentation Games =

- Status: Inactive
- Inaugurated: 1990
- Most recent: 1991
- Organizer: Liga ACB

The Liga ACB Presentation Games were exhibition matches at the start of a basketball season organised by the Spanish basketball league in the early 90s and they lasted for two seasons in 1990-91 and 1991-92. The games were both hosted in Palau Sant Jordi, in Barcelona, the home arena of Barcelona at the time. The main attraction of those exhibition games which could also be considered equivalent to the Spanish All-Star Game were the participations of NBA superstars: Michael Jordan in the 1990 edition and his teammate in the Chicago Bulls, Scottie Pippen and Philadelphia 76ers player Charles Barkley in the 1991 edition. David Robinson of San Antonio Spurs was also part of the 1991 edition but a hamstring injury kept him on the bench for the entire match.

== Concept ==
The game was a contest between the Orange (Narranja) and the Blues (Azul), teams which included the best players of the Liga ACB, a league considered the top in Europe, alongside the Italian. The NBA invitees would play for both teams, one half for each. Jordan had not won any NBA championship when he participated in the 1990 Liga ACB Presentation Game, but he would go on to win 6 rings in his career.

== List of games ==
Bold: Team that won the game.

Year	Date	Arena	City	Team	Score	Team
1990	August 30	Palau Sant Jordi	Barcelona	**Team Azul**	**100**-87	Team Narranja
1991	September 3	Palau Sant Jordi	Barcelona	**Team Azul**	**117**-110	Team Narranja

== 1990 ACB Presentation match ==
Palau Sant Jordi, att: 12,000, 30 August 1990: Team Azul - Team Orange 100-87.
Michael Jordan started with the Orange team and switched at the second half with the blue jersey. The end of the game found him on the winning side.

=== Rosters ===
**Team Azul**
Number	Player	Team
6	(Spain) José Miguel Antúnez	(Spain) Estudiantes Madrid
10	(Spain) Joan Creus	(Spain) CB Granollers
23	(United States) Michael Jordan	(United States) Chicago Bulls
31	(United States) (Spain) Mike Smith	(Spain) Unicaja Malaga
33	(United States) Mike Davis	(Spain) CB Granollers
40	(Spain) Jordi Villacampa	(Spain) Joventut Badalona
42	(United States) Dan Bingenheimer	(Spain) Caja San Fernando Sevilla
45	(United States) Rickie Winslow	(Spain) Estudiantes Madrid
51	(United States) Corny Thompson	(Spain) Joventut Badalona
54	(United States) Kevin Magee	(Spain) CAI Zaragoza
Coach		

**Team Narranja**
Number	Player	Team
0	(Spain) José Luis Llorente	(Spain) Real Madrid
11	(Spain) José Antonio Montero	(Spain) Barcelona
23	(United States) Michael Jordan	(United States) Chicago Bulls
30	(Venezuela) Carl Herrera	(Spain) Real Madrid
32	(Spain) Antonio Martín Espina	(Spain) Real Madrid
35	(United States) Walter Berry	(Spain) Atletico Madrid Villalba
41	(United States) Brian Jackson	(Spain) Peñas Huesca
44	(United States) Mark Simpson	(Spain) CB Caja Bilbao
52	(Puerto Rico) Ramon Rivas	(Spain) Taugres
55	(United States) Audie Norris	(Spain) Barcelona
Coach		

=== Michael Jordan's statistics ===
Player	First-half	Second-half	Points	3-points	Team Narranja Pts	Team Azul Pts
(United States) Michael Jordan	Orange	Blue	37	6/7	16	21

== 1991 ACB Presentation match ==
Palau Sant Jordi, att: 12,500, 3 September August 1991: Team Azul - Team Orange 117-110 (ht: 51-57).
Pippen and Barkley started with the Orange team and closed the first half with a six point advantage for their team. They switched at the second half to the blue jersey and they finally won the game. David Robinson stayed on bench due to an injury.

=== Rosters ===
**Team Azul**
Number	Player	Team
00	(United States) (Spain) Mike Smith	(Spain) Joventut Badalona
20	(Lithuania) Arvydas Sabonis	(Spain) Real Madrid
25	(Spain) José Luis Llorente	(Spain) Real Madrid
30	(United States) Clarence Kea	(Spain) Juver Murcia
31	(United States) Harold Pressley	(Spain) Joventut Badalona
33	(United States) Scottie Pippen	(United States) Chicago Bulls
34	(United States) Charles Barkley	(United States) Philadelphia 76ers
40	(United States) Joe Arlauckas	(Spain) Taugres
42	(United States) Michael Anderson	(United States) Rapid City Thrillers
44	(Spain) Ignacio Solozábal	(Spain) Barcelona
50	(Spain) Jordi Villacampa	(Spain) Joventut Badalona
Coach		
	(Spain) Lolo Sainz	

**Team Narranja**
Number	Player	Team
10	(Spain) Rafael Jofresa	(Spain) Joventut Badalona
21	(Spain) Juan Antonio Orenga	(Spain) Estudiantes Madrid
22	(Argentina) Marcelo Nicola	(Spain) Taugres
24	(Spain) Alberto Herreros	(Spain) Estudiantes Madrid
33	(United States) Scottie Pippen	(United States) Chicago Bulls
34	(United States) Charles Barkley	(United States) Philadelphia 76ers
41	(United States) Brian Jackson	(Spain) Peñas Huesca
43	(United States) Darryl Middleton	(Spain) Girona
45	(United States) Mark Simpson	(Spain) CB Caja Bilbao
50	(United States) David Robinson*	(United States) San Antonio Spurs
51	(Spain) José Miguel Antúnez	(Spain) Estudiantes Madrid
54	(Puerto Rico) Piculin Ortiz	(Spain) Barcelona
Coach		
	(Socialist Federal Republic of Yugoslavia) Božidar Maljković	

=== Pippen/Barkley's statistics ===
Player	First-half	Second-Half	Total Points	Rebounds	Assists	Blocks
(United States) Scottie Pippen	Orange	Blue	15	2	2	-
(United States) Charles Barkley	Orange	Blue	22	7	5	1

== Players with most appearances ==
Player	Participations	Editions
(United States) Mark Simpson	2	1990, 1991
(United States) Brian Jackson	2	1990, 1991
(Spain) José Luis Llorente	2	1990, 1991
(Spain) José Miguel Antúnez	2	1990, 1991
(United States) (Spain) Mike Smith	2	1990, 1991
(Spain) Jordi Villacampa	2	1990, 1991

== NBA/CBA Guest players ==
Player	Team	League	Edition
(United States) Michael Jordan	(United States) Chicago Bulls	NBA	1990
(United States) Scottie Pippen	(United States) Chicago Bulls	NBA	1991
(United States) Charles Barkley	(United States) Philadelphia 76ers	NBA	1991
(United States) David Robinson	(United States) San Antonio Spurs	NBA	1991
(United States) Michael Anderson	(United States) Rapid City Thrillers	CBA	1991

== Top Scorers ==
=== Per edition ===
Edition	Player	Points	Team
1990	(United States) Michael Jordan	37	(Spain) Team Narranja
1990	(United States) Charles Barkley	22	(Spain) Team Azul

== Distinctions ==
Including the ACB Selection for the ULEB All-Star Game.

=== FIBA Hall of Fame ===
- (Lithuania) Arvydas Sabonis
- (Puerto Rico) Piculin Ortiz
- (United States) Michael Jordan
- (United States) David Robinson

=== Basketball Hall of Fame ===
- (Lithuania) Arvydas Sabonis
- (United States) David Robinson
- (United States) Charles Barkley
- (United States) Scottie Pippen
- (United States) Michael Jordan

=== FIBA's 50 Greatest Players (1991) ===
- (Lithuania) Arvydas Sabonis

== See also ==
- ACB Contests
- Liga de Verano ACB
