= Mark Simpson (basketball) =

American basketball player (born 1961)

Personal information
- Born: February 4, 1961 (age 65) Fort Wayne, Indiana, U.S.
- Listed height: 6 ft 8 in (2.03 m)
- Listed weight: 215 lb (98 kg)

Career information
- High school: Wawasee (Syracuse, Indiana)
- College: Catawba College (1979–1984)
- NBA draft: 1984: 7th round, 149th overall pick
- Drafted by: Denver Nuggets
- Playing career: 1984–1993
- Position: Power forward
- Number: 14

Career history
- 1984–1985: Beitar Tel Aviv
- 1985–1986: PAOK Thessaloniki
- 1986–1987: Caen
- 1987–1988: Beitar Tel Aviv
- 1988–1989: Napoli
- 1989–1991: Cajabilbao
- 1991–1993: Real Madrid

Career highlights
- FIBA European Cup winner (1992); Spanish League champion (1993); Spanish Cup winner (1993); Spanish League All-Star (1991); Israeli Premier League Top Scorer (1988)
- Stats at Basketball Reference

Mark Allen Simpson (born February 4, 1961) is an American former professional basketball player. As a player, Simpson was known for being a great 3-point shooter.

== College career ==
At a height of 2.03 meters (6'8") tall, Simpson, who was born in Fort Wayne, Indiana, USA, played at the power forward position. He attended Catawba College, where he played college basketball, from 1979 to 1984.

== Professional career ==
Simpson was selected in the seventh round, with the 149th pick of the 1984 NBA draft, by the Denver Nuggets. However, he did not play in the NBA. Instead, he made his career in Europe. His first season as a professional was in the Israeli Ligat HaAl, where he played with Beitar Tel Aviv.

Simpson then played in the Greek A1 National Category with PAOK Thessaloniki, in the French Nationale 1 with Caen, and then once again in Israel with Beitar Tel Aviv. In the 1988–89 season, while playing with the Italian club Paini Napoli, he averaged 22.7 points and 7.3 rebounds per game. His last four seasons as a professional were spent playing in Spain's ACB League.

He first played with Cajabilbao for two seasons, and then later played with Real Madrid for two seasons. With Real Madrid, he averaged 17.9 points and 4.8 rebounds per game, in the 1991–92 Spanish ACB League season. When he was with Real Madrid, as one of the club's two foreigner players, along with American Rickey Brown, he won the championship of the FIBA European Cup's 1991–92 season, against his former team, PAOK.

In the following 1992–93 season, the Lithuanian player Arvydas Sabonis joined Real Madrid, as their third foreign player on the team, along with Simpson and Brown. Real won the Spanish Double that season, as they won both the 1993 Spanish ACB League championship and the 1993 Spanish King's Cup title. After that season's Spanish ACB League Finals, Simpson decided to retire from his active playing career, due to knee problems. However, prior to his retirement, he failed a drug test, by ingesting an American drug called Elixir DM, "without the consent of the club's medical services". Simpson was trying to treat a bad cold. If he had not retired, he would have been sanctioned with a two year long ban from playing.
