= Mike Jones (basketball, born 1956) =

American basketball player

Personal information
- Born: 1956 (age 69–70) Alabama, U.S.
- Listed height: 201 cm (6 ft 7 in)

Career information
- Playing career: 1981–1983
- Position: Center / forward

Career history
- 1981–1983: Illawarra Hawks

Career highlights
- NBL MVP (1981); 2× NBL scoring champion (1981, 1983)

Michael Jones (born 1956) is an American former professional basketball player. He played three seasons with the Illawarra Hawks in the Australian National Basketball League (NBL) between 1981 and 1983, where he was the league's MVP in 1981 and the league's scoring champion in 1981 and 1983. He was listed by the NBL in 1983 as 201 cm and a center/forward.

== Early life ==
Jones was born in the state of Alabama.

== Professional career ==
Jones moved to Australia in 1981 to play for the Illawarra Hawks in the National Basketball League (NBL). He was voted league MVP in his first season and was the league's scoring champion with 671 points in 22 games for an average of 30.5 per game. He was also the free throw percentage leader for 1981 with 87.6% (113/129).

In his second season with the Hawks in 1982, Jones averaged a career-low 23.9 points per game.

Jones was club captain in his third season with the Hawks in 1983. He went on to earn the NBL scoring title for the second time with 719 points in 22 games for a career-high average of 32.7 per game.

For his career, Jones averaged 28.7 points on 51 per cent field goal shooting in 70 NBL games. In January 2018, he was named one of the 12 Greatest Hawks of All Time by the Illawarra Mercury.

Upon leaving the NBL, Jones reportedly returned to the United States to play semi-professionally.
