= Gold Coast Rollers =

Gold Coast Rollers may refer to:

- Gold Coast Rollers (NBL), former National Basketball League team
- Gold Coast Rollers (NBL1 North), NBL1 North team
