= Chris Cedar =

Australian basketball player (born 1988)

Townsville Heat
- Position: Point guard
- League: NBL1 North

Personal information
- Born: 18 October 1988 (age 37) Townsville, Queensland, Australia
- Listed height: 188 cm (6 ft 2 in)
- Listed weight: 80 kg (176 lb)

Career information
- High school: Townsville State (Townsville, Queensland)
- Playing career: 2007–present

Career history
- 2007–2013: Townsville Crocodiles
- 2008–2013: Townsville Heat
- 2014: Rockhampton Rockets
- 2015–2019: Mackay Meteors
- 2016: Townsville Crocodiles
- 2020: Logan Thunder
- 2021: Mackay Meteors
- 2022: Southern Districts Spartans
- 2023: South West Metro Pirates
- 2024: Logan Thunder
- 2025–present: Townsville Heat

Career highlights
- 3× QBL / NBL1 North champion (2014, 2015, 2021)

Christopher Cedar (born 18 October 1988) is an Australian basketball player for the Townsville Heat of the NBL1 North. He played six seasons for the Townsville Crocodiles in the National Basketball League (NBL) between 2007 and 2013. He returned to the Crocodiles for a short stint in 2016. In the NBL1 North, he has played for the Townsville Heat, Rockhampton Rockets, Mackay Meteors, Southern Districts Spartans and Logan Thunder. He won NBL1 North championships in 2014, 2015 and 2021.

== Early life ==
Born and raised in Townsville, Queensland, Cedar began playing basketball as a youth for the Whirlwinds Basketball Club. He attended Townsville State High School, where he led the basketball team to the 2006 National Schools title and was regarded as one of the best young Australian guards at the time. The following year, he led the Queensland Under 20 side at the U20 National Championships in Ballarat, Victoria.

== Professional career ==
=== Townsville Crocodiles and Heat (2007–2013) ===
Cedar first joined his hometown NBL team, the Townsville Crocodiles, as a development player for the 2007–08 season. There, he teamed up with his brother, Michael, who first joined the Crocodiles in 2005. Cedar appeared in eight games in his first season, averaging 1.3 points per game. Following the conclusion of the NBL season, he joined the Crocodiles' QBL affiliate team, the Townsville Heat. In 21 games for the Heat in 2008, he averaged 17.0 points, 5.5 rebounds and 4.4 assists per game.

Cedar retained his development player role with the Crocodiles for the 2008–09 season but did not receive any game time during his second season. He returned to the Heat for the 2009 QBL season and averaged 12.3 points, 4.8 rebounds and 4.4 assists in 16 games.

As a development player in 2009–10, Cedar stepped up to cover the absence of injured guard Kelvin Robertson during the second half of the season. He subsequently played in 15 games for the Crocodiles and again averaged 1.3 points per game. With the Heat in 2010, he averaged a career-high 20.9 points, 4.4 rebounds and 2.4 assists in 17 games.

Cedar spent one final season as a development player in 2010–11, playing in a career-low six games for the Crocodiles while scoring just four total points. He had another solid season with the Heat in 2011, averaging 11.6 points, 3.4 rebounds, 4.1 assists and 1.1 steals in 17 games.

In 2011–12, Cedar played his first season with the Crocodiles as a full-time squad member and subsequently averaged 4.6 points, 1.3 rebounds and 1.3 assists in 31 games. With the Heat in 2012, he averaged 17.9 points, a career-high 6.7 rebounds, 3.9 assists and 1.4 steals in 14 games.

In 2012–13, Cedar averaged 1.8 points and 1.2 rebounds in 26 games with the Crocodiles. In 86 NBL games over six seasons, he averaged 2.6 points and 1.0 rebounds per game.

With the Heat in 2013, Cedar averaged 17.9 points, 4.4 rebounds and 2.7 assists in 15 games.

=== Rockhampton Rockets (2014) ===
On 14 February 2014, Cedar signed with the Rockhampton Rockets for the 2014 QBL season. He helped the Rockets finish the regular season with a 14–2 record and subsequently by-passed the quarter-finals and straight into the semi-finals due to finishing first on the ladder. After defeating the Ipswich Force 115–97 in their semi-final match-up, the Rockets moved on to the best-of-three grand final series where they faced a Mackay Meteors team that featured Cedar's brother, Michael, and their former Crocodiles teammate Todd Blanchfield. The Rockets ended up sweeping the Meteors 2–0 to win the championship. He appeared in all 19 games for the Rockets in 2014, averaging 13.2 points, 3.9 rebounds, 3.8 assists and 1.4 steals per game.

=== Mackay Meteors and short stint with the Crocodiles (2015–2019) ===
On 26 November 2014, Cedar signed with the Mackay Meteors for the 2015 QBL season and was named team captain. Much like with the Rockets in 2014, Cedar helped the Meteors finish in first place on the ladder at the conclusion of the 2015 regular season, earning a 15–2 record and moved straight into the semi-finals. There they faced a resurgent Toowoomba Mountaineers team, but with a 104–92 win, the Meteors moved on to the grand final series for the second straight year. They faced the Brisbane Capitals in the best-of-three decider, eventually winning the series 2–1, with Cedar scoring 16 points in the decisive Game 3. With the victory, Cedar won his second straight QBL title. He appeared in all 21 games for the Meteors in 2015, averaging 19.1 points, 5.1 rebounds, 4.6 assists and 1.2 steals per game.

On 31 December 2015, Cedar was contacted by Townsville Crocodiles' assistant coach Greg Vanderjagt, who asked Cedar if he was interested in joining the Crocodiles as an injury replacement for Corey Maynard. Cedar happily accepted the offer and joined the Crocodiles in the New Year, signing a two-game contract with his former club. On 8 January 2016, he made his first appearance in an NBL game since 24 March 2013, coming off the bench to back-up import Jordair Jett. In 13 minutes of action, he recorded three points, one rebound and one assist in a 75–61 loss to the Cairns Taipans. Eight days later, he made his second appearance for the Crocodiles, recording three personal fouls in just under nine minutes of action in the team's 108–103 loss to the Adelaide 36ers.

On 5 February 2016, Cedar re-signed with the Mackay Meteors for the 2016 QBL season and continued on as team captain. On 1 July 2016, he scored a season-high 34 points in a 100–83 win over the South West Metro Pirates. He helped the Meteors finish the regular season in sixth place on the ladder with an 11–6 record. They went on to lose to the Cairns Marlins in quarter-finals. Cedar appeared in all 18 games for the Meteors in 2016, averaging 17.2 points, 4.8 rebounds, 4.1 assists and 1.3 steals per game.

In January 2017, Cedar re-signed with the Meteors for the 2017 season and continued on as team captain for a third straight year. On 15 July 2017, he scored a season-high 29 points in a 96–81 loss to the Townsville Heat. He helped the Meteors finish the regular season in second place on the ladder with a 14–3 record. The Meteors went on to reach the 2017 QBL Grand Final series, where despite a 50-point effort from Cedar in Game 3, Mackay were defeat 2–1 by the Townsville Heat. In 19 games for the Meteors in 2017, he averaged 20.2 points, 4.5 rebounds, 3.5 assists and 1.9 steals per game.

On 22 November 2017, Cedar re-signed with the Meteors for the 2018 season. In 20 games, he averaged 16.2 points, 4.4 rebounds, 3.7 assists and 1.4 steals per game.

On 8 January 2019, Cedar re-signed with the Meteors for the 2019 season. In 19 games, he averaged 19.7 points, 6.5 rebounds, 5.3 assists and 1.4 steals per game.

=== COVID-affected year (2020) ===
Cedar had signed with the USC Rip City for the 2020 NBL1 North season, but the season was cancelled due to the COVID-19 pandemic. He later played in the 2020 Queensland State League (QSL) for the Logan Thunder. In 10 games, he averaged 20.1 points, 5.6 rebounds, 5.6 assists and 2.6 steals per game.

=== Return to Mackay Meteors (2021) ===
On 1 March 2021, Cedar signed with the Mackay Meteors of the NBL1 North for the 2021 season. He helped the Meteors reach the best-of-three grand final series, where they defeated the Cairns Marlins 2–0 to win the championship. Cedar won his third title, scoring 16 points in game one and 10 points in game two. In 18 games, he averaged 15.94 points, 6.11 rebounds and 4.55 assists per game.

=== Southern Districts Spartans (2022) ===
In December 2021, Cedar signed with the Southern Districts Spartans for the 2022 NBL1 North season. In 19 games, he averaged 15.11 points, 5.37 rebounds and 5.0 assists per game.

=== South West Metro Pirates (2023) ===
In December 2022, Cedar signed with the South West Metro Pirates for the 2023 NBL1 North season. In 20 games, he averaged 7.15 points, 4.95 rebounds and 3.15 assists per game.

=== Logan Thunder (2024) ===
On 1 March 2024, Cedar signed with the Logan Thunder for the 2024 NBL1 North season, returning to the team for a second stint. In 18 games, he averaged 9.22 points, 3.22 rebounds and 1.5 assists per game.

=== Townsville Heat (2025–present) ===
In April 2025, Cedar signed with the Townsville Heat for the 2025 NBL1 North season, returning to the team for the first time since 2013.

On 25 July 2025, Cedar announced his retirement from the NBL1.

== Personal life ==
Cedar's older brother, Michael, is also a professional basketball player who played eight seasons in the NBL for the Townsville Crocodiles between 2005 and 2013. Michael has also played in the QBL.

Cedar's wife, Naomi, played many years in the QBL women's competition.
