= Ray Willis (basketball) =

American basketball player (born 1989)

Personal information
- Born: September 13, 1989 (age 37) Tulsa, Oklahoma, U.S.
- Listed height: 6 ft 6 in (1.98 m)
- Listed weight: 164 lb (74 kg)

Career information
- High school: Dr. Phillips (Orlando, Florida); Westlake (Atlanta, Georgia)
- College: Oklahoma (2008–2010); North Carolina Central (2011–2013)
- NBA draft: 2013: undrafted
- Playing career: 2013–2018
- Position: Point guard / shooting guard

Career history
- 2013: Maccabi Be'er Ya'akov
- 2014: Kauhajoen Karhu
- 2014: Elitzur Yavne
- 2015–2017: Gladstone Port City Power
- 2015–2016: Sundsvall Dragons
- 2018: Rockhampton Rockets

Career highlights
- 2× QBL All-League Team (2016, 2017); QBL scoring champion (2017); 2× Second-team All-MEAC (2012, 2013)

Raymond Willis Jr. (born September 13, 1989) is an American former professional basketball player. He played college basketball for the University of Oklahoma and North Carolina Central University before playing professionally in Israel, Finland, Australia and Sweden.

== High school career ==
For the first three years of his high school career, Willis attended Dr. Phillips High School in Orlando, Florida, where he averaged 18 points and eight rebounds per game as a junior in 2006–07 while earning first-team All-Metro Conference and second-team All-Central Florida honors.

During the summer of 2007, Willis transferred to Westlake High School in Atlanta, Georgia, and later signed a National Letter of Intent to play college basketball for the University of Oklahoma in November 2007.

As a senior in 2007–08 playing for Westlake, Willis averaged 27.5 points, seven rebounds and five assists per game. He subsequently earned first-team Class AAAA all-state honors and was ranked No. 61 in the 2008 recruiting class by Scout.com and No. 109 by Rivals.com.

== College career ==
=== Oklahoma ===
On August 31, 2008, prior to the start of his freshman season at Oklahoma, Willis was admitted to hospital with multiple stab wounds he sustained in a nightclub altercation. Willis recovered in time for the start of the 2008–09 season and was able to play in his team's season opening win over American University, appearing in just six minutes off the bench. However, his freshman season was cut short after he was suspended from the team on February 8, 2009 after he was arrested the day before for driving under the influence of alcohol. He appeared in just two of the team's final 16 games of the season, both of which were NCAA Tournament games. In those 16 games, he averaged 3.3 points and 1.4 rebounds in 6.4 minutes per game.

Willis' sophomore season was also a dismal one as he appeared in just 13 games for head coach Jeff Capel, and was part of a Sooners team that finished the 2009–10 season with a 13–18 record, the program's first losing campaign since 1980–81. He managed two starts and averaged 2.2 points and 2.6 rebounds in 12.2 minutes per game, while shooting just 25% from the field. His disappointing tenure with the Sooners program came to an end on March 24, 2010 when coach Capel announced Willis' departure from Oklahoma.

=== NC Central ===
In August 2010, Willis transferred to North Carolina Central University but was forced to sit out the 2010–11 season due to NCAA transfer regulations. He joined the Eagles men's basketball team for his redshirted junior season in 2011–12 and was immediately introduced into the starting line-up where he featured for 31 of the team's 32 games. He had a break-through season and averaged career highs in all major statistical categories. He subsequently earned second-team All-MEAC honors and was named MEAC Player of the Week on two occasions (November 27 and February 6). In 32 games, he averaged 14.6 points, 5.6 rebounds, 2.7 assists and 1.3 steals in 32.4 minutes per game.

As a senior in 2012–13, Willis was again a prolific starter for the Eagles as he earned starting nods in all 31 games on the season. He was again named to the second-team All-MEAC and earned All-Tournament team honors in the 2012 Global Sports Hoops Showcase in Laramie, Wyoming, where he scored 20 points in back-to-back games for the Eagles. He was also named to the NABC Division I All-District 15 second team after his 84% free throw shooting was the highest free throw percentage in school history since the 2002–03 season when Shawn Ray shot 83.2%. In 31 games, he averaged 12.0 points, 4.5 rebounds, 1.5 assists and 1.0 steals in 31.2 minutes per game.

=== College statistics ===
Year	Team	GP	GS	MPG	FG%	3P%	FT%	RPG	APG	SPG	BPG	PPG
2008–09	Oklahoma	16	0	6.4	.327	.333	.778	1.4	.1	.3	.0	3.3
2009–10	Oklahoma	13	2	12.2	.250	.316	.750	2.2	.3	.3	.5	2.6
2011–12	NC Central	32	31	32.4	.432	.316	.794	5.6	2.7	1.3	.7	14.6
2012–13	NC Central	31	31	31.2	.429	.301	.840	4.5	1.5	1.0	.5	12.0
Career		92	64	24.6	.415	.312	.808	4.0	1.5	.9	.5	10.1

== Professional career ==
=== 2013–14 season ===
After going undrafted in the 2013 NBA draft, Willis signed with Slovak club BC Prievidza on August 14, 2013. However, less than two months later, he parted ways with Prievidza before appearing in a game for them and signed with Maccabi Be'er Ya'akov of the Israeli National League. He made his debut for Be'er Ya'akov on October 15 with a 27-point, 15-rebound performance. His final game for the club came on December 25 with an eight-point performance, and in 11 total games, he averaged 18.6 points and 9.5 rebounds per game.

In March 2014, Willis signed with Kauhajoen Karhu of the Finnish Korisliiga for the rest of the season. In 11 games for Karhu, he averaged 16.0 points, 6.8 rebounds and 2.9 assists per game.

=== 2014–15 season ===
Willis returned to Israel for the 2014–15 season and signed with Elitzur Yavne, also of the National League. He made his debut for Elitzur on October 21, 2014, but his stint with the club lasted just six games as he departed in late November. In those six games, he averaged 18.5 points, 9.0 rebounds, 3.3 assists and 1.8 steals per game.

In February 2015, Willis was approached by the Gladstone Port City Power of the Queensland Basketball League and was offered the opportunity to play in Australia. He teamed up with his good friend, Justin Baker, with whom he played alongside at both Maccabi Be'er Ya'akov and Kauhajoen Karhu during the 2013–14 season. On June 22, 2015, he was named Player of the Week for Round 8 after scoring 22 points against Bundaberg on June 20, and 33 points against Ipswich on June 21. A month later, he earned Player of the Week honors for a second time, this time for recording 38 points and 14 rebounds in a Round 12 victory over the Rockhampton Rockets on July 18. He helped lead the Power to a semi-final appearance where they lost to the Brisbane Capitals in the dying seconds of the game. In 19 games for the Power, Willis averaged 21.4 points, 11.3 rebounds, 4.9 assists and 1.8 steals per game.

=== 2015–16 season ===
On September 11, 2015, Willis signed a try-out contract with the Sundsvall Dragons of the Swedish Basketligan. He was successful during the try-out period and made the playing roster, suiting up for the team during pre-season action. He made his regular season debut for Sundsvall in the team's season opener on October 2 against Umeå. In just under 29 minutes of action, he recorded 16 points, 7 rebounds, 4 assists and 3 steals in an 88–73 win. On November 20, he scored a season-high 18 points in a 92–73 win over Malbas. He topped that mark on December 19, scoring 22 points against the Södertälje Kings. He bested his season high again on January 22, scoring 27 points against Uppsala Basket. Sundsvall finished the regular season in sixth position with a 15–15 record, and in the quarter-finals, they faced the Norrköping Dolphins where they lost the best-of-five series 3–1. Willis appeared in 32 of the team's 34 games in 2015–16, averaging 12.3 points, 6.3 rebounds, 2.1 assists and 1.3 steals per game.

Willis returned to the Gladstone Port City Power for the 2016 Queensland Basketball League season and was named team captain. He made his season debut for the Power in the team's second game of the season on May 7, playing the entire 40 minutes of the game and scoring 27 points in a 74–73 loss to the Gold Coast Rollers. The following night, he again played the entire 40 minutes of the match and recorded 33 points, 11 rebounds, 7 assists and 5 steals in a 91–84 win over the South West Metro Pirates. On May 14, he recorded 33 points, 12 rebounds and nine assists in a 105–90 win over the Toowoomba Mountaineers. He subsequently earned Player of the Week honors for Round 3. On June 11, he recorded 39 points and 14 rebounds in a 105–100 win over the Ipswich Force. On July 27, he was named Player of the Week for Round 13 after recording 32 points, 7 rebounds and 5 assists in a 103–100 win over the Rockhampton Rockets on July 23. In the Power's season finale on August 6, Willis scored 27 points in a 94–92 loss to the Sunshine Coast Phoenix Clippers. The Power missed a playoff spot in 2016 with a 7–10 record. In 15 games for the club in 2016, he averaged 24.7 points, 8.8 rebounds, 4.5 assists and 1.8 steals per game. He was subsequently named to the QBL All-League Team.

=== 2016–17 season ===
On November 9, 2016, Willis re-signed with the Gladstone Port City Power for the 2017 Queensland Basketball League season. In the Power's season opener on April 29, Willis played the entire 40 minutes of the game and scored a game-high 27 points in an 87–66 loss to the Mackay Meteors. On June 3, he scored a season-high 36 points to go with 12 rebounds in a 91–71 loss to the Brisbane Spartans. On June 24, he set a new season high with 39 points in a 100–93 loss to the Mackay Meteors. He was subsequently named Player of the Week for Round 9. On July 7, he had a 36-point effort in an 81–69 win over the Toowoomba Mountaineers. A day later, he scored a career-best 46 points, while playing the entire 40 minutes of the game, in a 100–94 win over the Ipswich Force. He was subsequently named Player of the Week for Round 11. On July 15, he had another 36-point effort in a 99–77 win over the Rockhampton Rockets. He was subsequently named Player of the Week for Round 12. On July 22, he had a 38-point effort in an 85–63 loss to the Cairns Marlins. In the Power's season finale on August 6, Willis had a 37-point effort in a 95–79 loss to Cairns. The Power finished the regular season in 12th place with a 5–12 record. For his efforts in 2017, Willis was named to his second straight QBL All-League Team and was bestowed the honor of the league's leading scorer. Willis appeared in all 17 games for the Power, averaging 29.5 points, 7.8 rebounds and 4.0 assists per game. He parted ways with Gladstone following the 2017 season and attended the Sydney Kings' Rookie Camp.

=== 2017–18 season ===
On December 8, 2017, Willis signed with the Rockhampton Rockets for the 2018 QBL season. In his debut for the Rockets in their season opener on April 27, 2018, Willis scored 21 points in a 107–94 win over the Logan Thunder. On May 25, he recorded 27 points and 12 rebounds in a 93–83 win over his former team, the Gladstone Port City Power. On June 8, he scored a game-high 34 points in a 121–114 overtime loss to the Sunshine Coast Phoenix. On June 30, he recorded 30 points and 14 rebounds in a 112–96 win over the Power. On July 7, he recorded 27 points and 16 rebounds in an 82–79 win over the Southern Districts Spartans. The Rockets finished the regular season in eighth place with a 9–9 record before losing 92–74 to the Mackay Meteors in the quarter-finals. In 17 games, he averaged 22.8 points, 8.6 rebounds, 3.6 assists and 1.5 steals per game.
