= 2009 Queensland Basketball League season =

- League: Queensland Basketball League
- Sport: Basketball
- Duration: 24 April – 15 August
- Games: 18
- Teams: 14

Regular season
- Minor premiers: Cairns Marlins
- Season MVP: Cameron Tragardh (Northside Wizards)
- Top scorer: Cameron Tragardh (Northside Wizards)

Finals
- Champions: Cairns Marlins
- Runners-up: Rockhampton Rockets
- Grand Final MVP: Kerry Williams

QBL seasons
- ← 2008 2010 →

The 2009 Men's Queensland Basketball League season was the 24th running of the competition. The Cairns Marlins won the championship in 2009 to claim their seventh league title.

The teams for this season were: Brisbane Capitals, Bundaberg Bulls, Caboolture Suns, Cairns Marlins, Gladstone Port City Power, Gold Coast Goannas, Ipswich Force, Mackay Meteors, Maroochydore Clippers, Northside Wizards, Rockhampton Rockets, South West Metro Pirates, Toowoomba Mountaineers and Townsville Heat.

== Team information ==
Team	Home stadium
Brisbane Capitals	Vince Hickey Basketball Stadium
Bundaberg Bulls	Century 21 Stadium
Caboolture Suns	Caloundra Indoor Sports Stadium
Cairns Marlins	Bendigo Bank Basketball Centre
Gladstone Port City Power	Kev Broome Stadium
Gold Coast Goannas	Tallebudgera Leisure Centre
Ipswich Force	Ipswich Basketball Stadium
Mackay Meteors	Mackay Basketball Stadium
Maroochydore Clippers	Maroochydore Basketball Stadium
Northside Wizards	The Sports Centre Boondall
Rockhampton Rockets	Hegvold Stadium
South West Metro Pirates	Hibiscus Sports Complex
Toowoomba Mountaineers	Toowoomba Basketball Stadium
Townsville Heat	NPA Stadium

== Finals ==
- QF 1: 1st in Pool A vs. 2nd in Pool A
- QF 2: 1st in Pool B vs. 2nd in Pool B
- QF 3: 1st in Pool C vs. 2nd in Pool C

Quarter-finals
QF3	Gold Coast Goannas	100
SW Metro Pirates	110
QF1	Rockhampton Rockets	93
Mackay Meteors	69
QF2	Brisbane Capitals	108
Northside Wizards	94

Semi-finals
1	Cairns Marlins*	115
SW Metro Pirates	78
Rockhampton Rockets	91
Brisbane Capitals	73

Grand Final
Cairns Marlins	113
Rockhampton Rockets	81

*The team that finishes 1st overall goes straight through to the semi-finals.

== Awards ==
=== Player of the Week ===
Round	Player	Team	Ref
1	Anthony Tribe	Toowoomba Mountaineers	
2	Cameron Tragardh	Northside Wizards	
3	Unknown		
4	Reggie Golson	Rockhampton Rockets	
5	Michael Kingma	Gladstone Port City Power	
6	Cameron Tragardh	Northside Wizards	
7	Unknown		
8	Cameron Tragardh	Northside Wizards	
9	Matthew Hanson	Bundaberg Bulls	
10	Scott McGregor	Gold Coast Goannas	
11	Reggie Golson	Rockhampton Rockets	
12	Aaron Grabau	Cairns Marlins	
13	Scott Cook	Mackay Meteors	
14	Verle Williams	South West Metro Pirates	
15	Anthony Esparza	Gladstone Port City Power	
QF	Ben Castle	Brisbane Capitals	

=== Coach of the Month ===
Month	Coach	Team	Ref
April/May	Leonard King	Mackay Meteors	
May/June	N/A		
June/July	Dale Ryan	Brisbane Capitals	
July/August	Aaron Fearne	Cairns Marlins	

=== Statistics leaders ===
Category	Player	Team	Stat
Points per game	Cameron Tragardh	Northside Wizards	42.3
Rebounds per game	Matthew Hanson	Bundaberg Bulls	16.6
Assists per game	James Cochran	Gladstone Port City Power	6.3
Steals per game	Michael O'Neill	Caboolture Suns	2.7
Blocks per game	Duncan Milne	Caboolture Suns	1.8
Field goal percentage	David Bartholomeaus	Brisbane Capitals	63.4%
3-pt field goal percentage	Aaron Grabau	Cairns Marlins	50.6%
Free throw percentage	David Gurney	Gold Coast Goannas	91.9%

=== Regular season ===
- Most Valuable Player: Cameron Tragardh (Northside Wizards)
- Coach of the Year: Leonard King (Mackay Meteors)
- U23 Youth Player of the Year: Jonothan Mines (South West Metro Pirates)
- All-League Team:
  - G: Rhys Martin (Rockhampton Rockets)
  - G: Scott Cook (Mackay Meteors)
  - F: Reggie Golson (Rockhampton Rockets)
  - F: Aaron Grabau (Cairns Marlins)
  - C: Cameron Tragardh (Northside Wizards)

=== Finals ===
- Grand Final MVP: Kerry Williams (Cairns Marlins)
