= Todd Blanchfield =

Australian basketball player (born 1991)

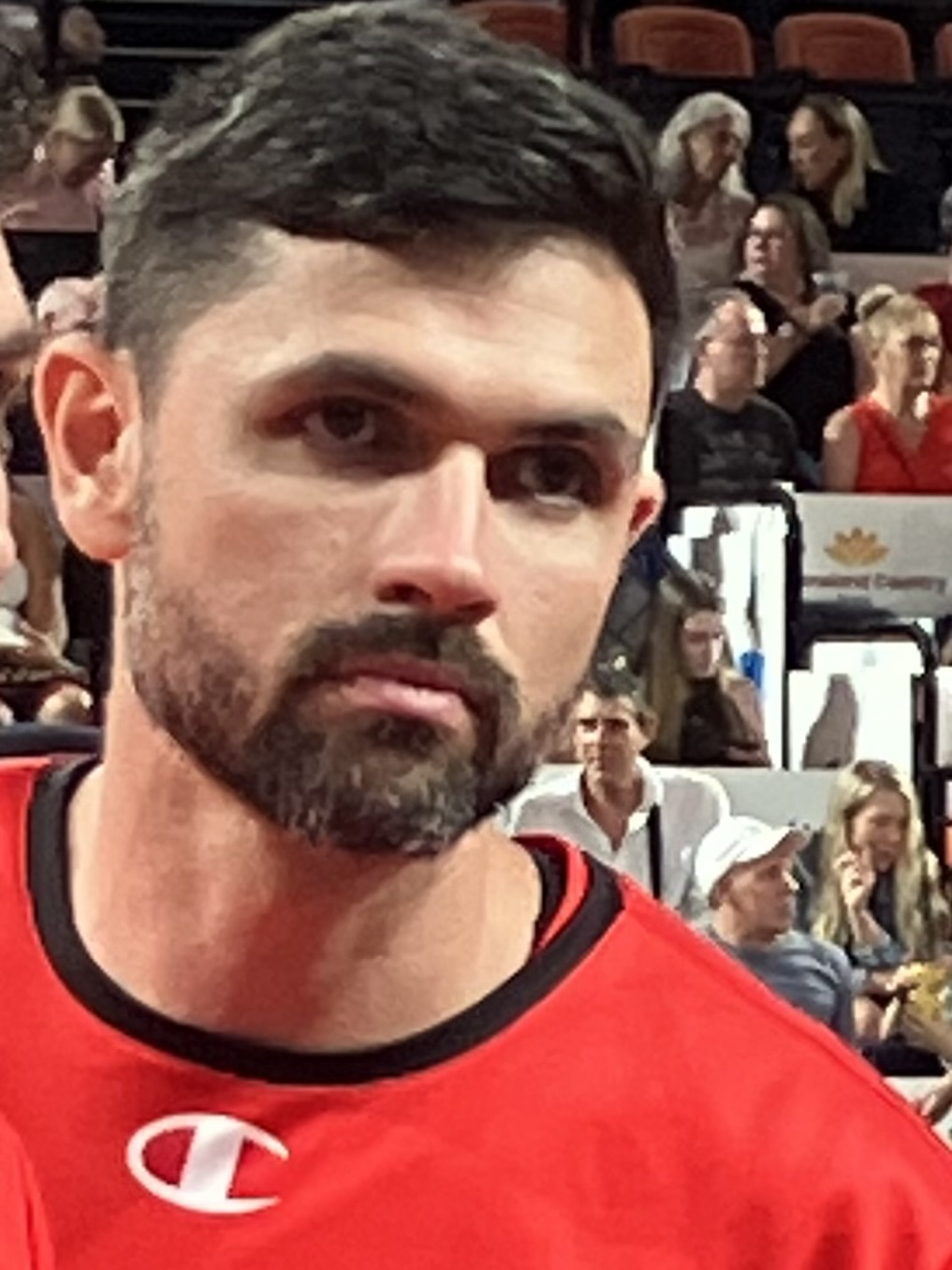
- Blanchfield with the Perth Wildcats in 2022

No. 21 – Illawarra Hawks
- Position: Small forward / shooting guard
- League: NBL

Personal information
- Born: 7 November 1991 (age 35) Mackay, Queensland, Australia
- Listed height: 198 cm (6 ft 6 in)
- Listed weight: 98 kg (216 lb)

Career information
- High school: Mackay State (Mackay, Queensland)
- Playing career: 2007–present

Career history
- 2007: Mackay Meteors
- 2008: Australian Institute of Sport
- 2009–2010: Mackay Meteors
- 2009–2015: Townsville Crocodiles
- 2011–2013: Townsville Heat
- 2014: Mackay Meteors
- 2015: Southland Sharks
- 2015–2017: Melbourne United
- 2017: Townsville Heat
- 2017–2018: Sydney Kings
- 2018: Mackay Meteors
- 2018–2020: Illawarra Hawks
- 2019: Southland Sharks
- 2020–2023: Perth Wildcats
- 2022: Rockhampton Rockets
- 2023: Gold Coast Rollers
- 2023–present: Illawarra Hawks
- 2024: Mackay Meteors
- 2025–2026: Illawarra Hawks (NBL1 East)

Career highlights
- NBL champion (2025); NBL Cup winner (2021); All-NBL Second Team (2015); NBL Most Improved Player (2015); NZNBL champion (2015); NZNBL All-Star Five (2015); 2× NBL1 East MVP (2025, 2026); 2× NBL1 East All-Star Five (2025, 2026); NBL1 North champion (2024); NBL1 North Finals MVP (2024); 2× All-NBL1 North First Team (2023, 2024); QBL MVP (2018); 4× QBL All-League Team (2011, 2012, 2014, 2018); 2× QBL U23 Youth Player of the Year (2011, 2012)
Medals
Men's basketball
Representing Australia
FIBA Asia Cup
| Gold medal – first place | 2017 Lebanon |

Todd Blanchfield (born 7 November 1991) is an Australian professional basketball player for the Illawarra Hawks of the National Basketball League (NBL). He began his NBL career in 2009 with the Townsville Crocodiles, where he played six seasons. Between 2015 and 2023, he played for Melbourne United (2015–17), Sydney Kings (2017–18), Illawarra Hawks (2018–20) and Perth Wildcats (2020–23). He joined the Illawarra Hawks in 2023 for a second stint and helped the team win the NBL championship in 2025.

In 2017, Blanchfield won a gold medal with Australia at the FIBA Asia Cup.

== Early life ==
Born and raised in Mackay, Queensland, Blanchfield attended Mackay State High School and played for representative teams of Mackay Basketball Association. In January 2008, he travelled to the United States on an Australian schoolboys tour of North Carolina.

== Professional career ==
=== NBL ===
==== Townsville Crocodiles (2009–2015) ====
In July 2009, Blanchfield signed with the Townsville Crocodiles of the National Basketball League. He appeared in 10 games during the 2009–10 season as a development player.

In June 2010, Blanchfield signed a three-year contract with the Crocodiles. In 27 games during the 2010–11 season, he averaged 2.6 points and 1.5 rebounds per game. In 31 games during the 2011–12 season, he averaged 7.2 points and 3.3 rebounds per game.

In May 2012, Blanchfield signed a two-year extension to remain under contract with the Crocodiles through the 2014–15 season.

In 2012–13, Blanchfield averaged 9.4 points and 4.1 rebounds in 28 games. He went on to average 11.0 points, 5.3 rebounds and 1.5 assists in 28 games during the 2013–14 season.

In 2014–15, Blanchfield earned NBL Player of the Week honours twice. He was named the NBL's Most Improved Player and earned All-NBL Second Team honours. In 28 games, he averaged 14.6 points, 6.0 rebounds and 1.7 assists per game.

==== Melbourne United (2015–2017) ====
On 22 May 2015, Blanchfield signed a two-year deal with Melbourne United. In his debut for United on 9 October 2015 in the team's season opener, Blanchfield scored a career-high 29 points with seven 3-pointers in a 99–84 win over the Crocodiles. He went on to help United earn the minor premiership after finishing the regular season in first place with an 18–10 record. However, in their semi-final series against the fourth-seeded New Zealand Breakers, United were swept 2–0 to bow out of the playoffs. Blanchfield appeared in all 30 games for United in 2015–16, averaging 9.6 points and 6.5 rebounds per game.

On 16 October 2016, in United's fourth game of the 2016–17 season, Blanchfield hit eight 3-pointers and scored 27 points on 9-of-11 shooting in a 95–83 win over the Illawarra Hawks. He later missed three weeks with a groin injury. For the season, he averaged 8.8 points, 3.9 rebounds and 1.0 steals in 22 games.

==== Sydney Kings (2017–2018) ====
On 24 March 2017, Blanchfield signed a two-year deal with the Sydney Kings. On 8 May 2018, he was released by the Kings per his request. In his lone season with Sydney, Blanchfield averaged 9.1 points and 4.0 rebounds per game on 33.3% shooting from beyond the arc.

==== Illawarra Hawks (2018–2020) ====
On 11 May 2018, Blanchfield signed a three-year deal with the Illawarra Hawks. On 6 January 2020, he scored a career-high 35 points in a 102–96 loss to the Adelaide 36ers. He won his second successive Hawks MVP award in 2019–20 while averaging 13 points and four rebounds per game.

Blanchfield became a free agent following the 2019–20 season following an ownership change at the Hawks.

==== Perth Wildcats (2020–2023) ====
On 20 July 2020, Blanchfield signed a two-year contract with the Perth Wildcats. In game one of the Wildcats' semi-final series against the Illawarra Hawks on 10 June 2021, they lost 74–72 despite a game-high 24 points from Blanchfield. After winning game two 79–71, Blanchfield scored 21 of his 24 points in the first half of the Wildcats' 79–71 win in game three to clinch the series 2–1. In game one of the grand final series against Melbourne United, the Wildcats lost 73–70 despite a game-high 27 points from Blanchfield. They went on to lose the series 3–0.

On 21 September 2021, Blanchfield was sidelined for three to four months after undergoing surgery to repair damaged cartilage in his left knee. He returned from injury in mid December, but in just his second game of the season, he re-injured his left knee. He was subsequently ruled out for a further three to four weeks. On 6 March 2022, he scored 17 of his season-high 22 points in the first quarter of the Wildcats' 92–73 win over the Adelaide 36ers.

On 27 May 2022, Blanchfield re-signed with the Wildcats on a three-year deal. He played his 350th NBL game in October 2022.

On 14 April 2023, Blanchfield parted ways with the Wildcats.

==== Return to Illawarra (2023–present) ====
On 28 June 2023, Blanchfield signed a two-year deal with the Illawarra Hawks, returning to the franchise for a second stint. In March 2024, he played his 400th NBL game.

Blanchfield started the 2024–25 NBL season averaging 8.5 minutes in the opening 20 games. Following an injury to import Darius Days, his minutes increased to 18.2 minutes over the next nine matches. In game one of the Hawks' semi-finals series against the South East Melbourne Phoenix, Blanchfield had 16 points with four 3-pointers along with six rebounds in a win. In game three, he scored 28 points and hit a career-high eight 3-pointers in a 126–96 win, helping the Hawks advance to the grand final. He helped the Hawks defeat Melbourne United 3–2 in the grand final series to win his first NBL championship. In 33 games for the season, he averaged 5.4 points and 2.1 rebounds per game.

On 7 April 2025, Blanchfield re-signed with the Hawks on a three-year deal. In November 2025, he played his 450th NBL game, becoming just the 32nd player in NBL history to play 450 games.

=== Australian state leagues and New Zealand NBL ===
In 2007, Blanchfield played his first season with the Mackay Meteors in QBL, where he was a valuable member of the team despite being just 15 years old. He moved to Canberra in 2008 to attend the Australian Institute of Sport (AIS) and played for the AIS men's team in the South East Australian Basketball League (SEABL), where he averaged five points and two rebounds in 12 games. He returned to the Meteors in 2009 and averaged 20.6 points, 7.7 rebounds and 2.1 assists per game. With the Meteors in 2010, he averaged 18.7 points, 6.4 rebounds and 1.5 assists in 21 games.

In 2011, Blanchfield played for the Townsville Heat. He averaged 18.4 points, 4.7 rebounds and 1.6 assists in 18 games, and was named in the QBL All-League Team. With the Heat in 2012, he earned QBL All-League Team honours for the second straight year after averaging 19.7 points, 7.4 rebounds, 1.8 assists and 1.8 steals in 13 games. With the Heat in 2013, he averaged 17.0 points, 8.0 rebounds and 1.5 assists in 13 games.

Blanchfield returned to the Meteors in 2014 and helped them reach the grand final. He earned QBL All-League Team honours for the third time in four years. In 18 games, he averaged 19.3 points, 8.9 rebounds, 2.8 assists and 1.1 steals per game.

On 9 January 2015, Blanchfield signed with the Southland Sharks as an import for the 2015 New Zealand NBL season. He scored a game-high 28 points in his debut for the Sharks. He later earned NBL Player of the Week honours for round eight and led the Sharks to victory in the grand final with a game-high 23 points and 14 rebounds in a 72–68 win over the Wellington Saints. For the season, he earned NBL All-Star Five honours. In 20 games, he averaged 21.1 points, 7.0 rebounds, 1.1 assists and 1.3 steals per game.

In 2017, Blanchfield played with the Townsville Heat as a short-term injury replacement for Jamell Anderson.

In 2018, Blanchfield returned to the Meteors and averaged 21 points, 10 rebounds and 4.3 assists on 47% shooting, which saw him voted league MVP and a member of the QBL All-League Team.

On 18 March 2019, Blanchfield signed with the Southland Sharks for the 2019 New Zealand NBL season, returning to the team for a second stint. In 19 games, he averaged 16.6 points, 6.0 rebounds, 1.8 assists and 1.3 steals per game.

Blanchfield was set to play for the Rockhampton Rockets of the NBL1 North in the 2020 NBL1 season, but the season was cancelled due to the COVID-19 pandemic. He re-joined Rockhampton for the 2022 NBL1 North season.

In April 2023, Blanchfield joined the Gold Coast Rollers of the NBL1 North for the 2023 season. He was named to the All-NBL1 North First Team and helped the team reach the grand final series.

Blanchfield joined the Mackay Meteors in the 2024 NBL1 North season. He was named to the NBL1 North First Team for the second straight year. He went on to help the Meteors win the NBL1 North championship while earning Finals MVP.

Blanchfield joined the Illawarra Hawks of the NBL1 East for the 2025 season. He was named the NBL1 East MVP and earned NBL1 East All-Star Five honours. He helped the Hawks reach the NBL1 East Grand Final, where they lost 99–91 to the Canberra Gunners despite Blanchfield's game-high 29 points and 14 rebounds. He re-joined the Hawks for the 2026 NBL1 East season, earning league MVP and All-Star Five honours for the second straight year. For the 2026 season, he had a 25-point triple-double (the first triple-double of his NBL1 career) and eleven 25-point double-doubles.

== National team career ==
In 2008, Blanchfield earned selection for the under 19 Australian Emus squad. He helped the Emus defeat the United States to claim bronze at the Albert Schweitzer Tournament in Germany. Later that year, helped the Emus claim bronze at the William Jones Cup in Taiwan.

In 2012, Blanchfield played for Australia at the Stanković Cup, where he won a silver medal. In 2013, he played for Australia at the Stanković Cup and the World University Games, where he won gold and silver respectively.

In 2017, Blanchfield won a gold medal with Australia at the FIBA Asia Cup.

In June 2022, Blanchfield was named in the Boomers' World Cup Qualifiers team. He re-joined the team for the next qualifying window in February 2023.

In April 2023, Blanchfield helped the Australia 3x3 team win silver at the FIBA 3x3 Asia Cup. Twelve months later, he helped Australia win gold at the 2024 FIBA 3x3 Asia Cup. He was named tournament MVP in 2024 after top scoring with 47 points in five games.

In April 2025, Blanchfield was named in the Boomers squad for a trans-Tasman series against New Zealand in May.

== Personal life ==
As of October 2023, Blanchfield and his wife Jess were expecting their first child in December 2023.
