= Michael Kingma =

Australian-Dutch basketball player (born 1979)

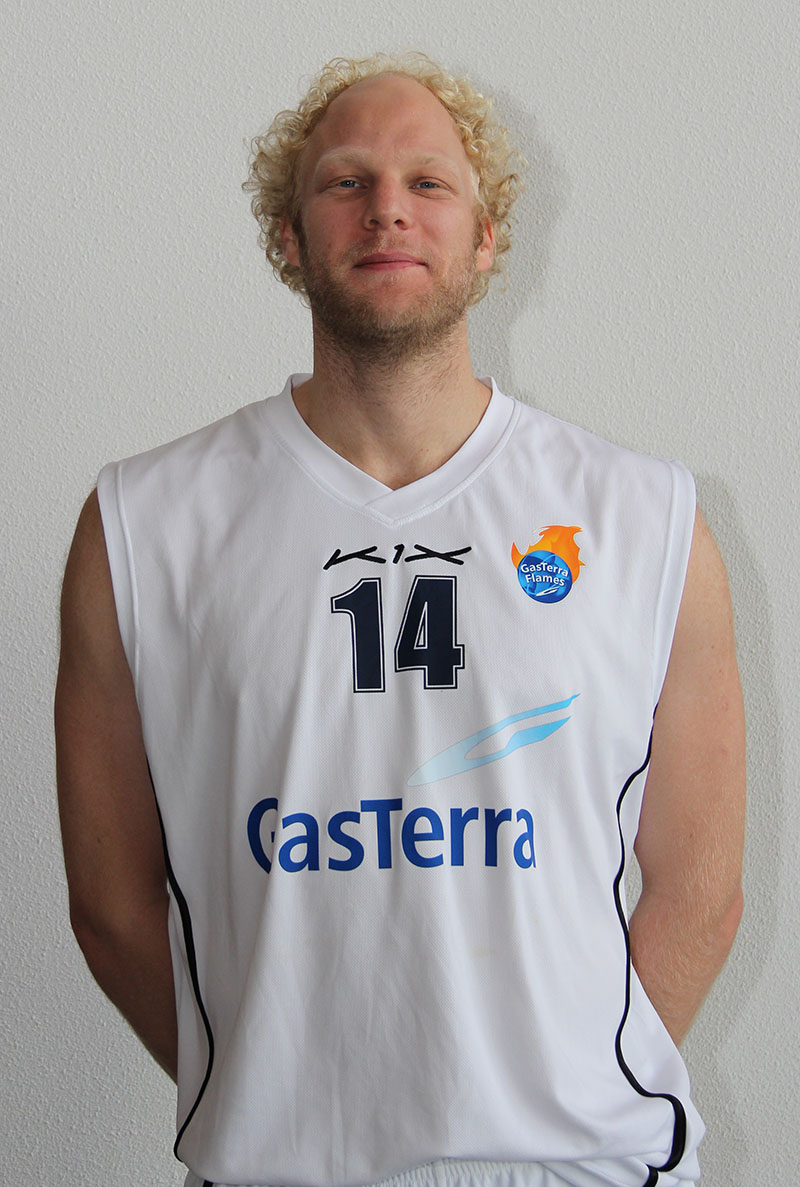
- Kingma in his Flames uniform in 2012

Personal information
- Born: 9 August 1979 (age 47) Manly, New South Wales
- Listed height: 207 cm (6 ft 9 in)
- Listed weight: 120 kg (265 lb)

Career information
- Playing career: 1997–2013
- Position: Center

Career history
- 1997–2003: Sydney Kings
- 2003–2004: Hunter Pirates
- 2004: Otago Nuggets
- 2004–2005: Scarlet Vilvoorde
- 2005–2006: Aris Leeuwarden
- 2006–2007: Sundsvall Dragons
- 2007–2009: Borås
- 2009–2010: Sundsvall Dragons
- 2010–2011: Glasgow Rocks
- 2012–2013: GasTerra Flames

Career highlights
- NBL champion (2003); 4× QBL champion (2010, 2011, 2013, 2014)

Michael John Kingma (born 9 August 1979) is an Australian-Dutch former professional basketball player.

== Professional career ==
Kingma was born in Manly, New South Wales, where he started his basketball playing as a junior. Kingma played seven seasons in Australia's National Basketball League, including six seasons with the Sydney Kings. He was a member of the Kings' 2003 NBL championship team, averaging 2.8 points and 1.8 rebounds that year.

For the 2003–04 season, Kingma joined the Hunter Pirates, before leaving Australia. He briefly played in Belgium and in Leeuwarden, Netherlands. In 2006 he moved to Sweden to play for Sundsvall Dragons. In 2007 and 2008 he played for Borås Basket, returning to Sundsvall for the 2009–10 season.

Kingma played in the Queensland Basketball League (QBL) for the Rockhampton Rockets and the Mackay Meteors winning championships in 2010 (Rockets) and 2011 (Meteors).

For the 2010–11 season, Kingma played for the British Basketball League team Glasgow Rocks.

For the 2012–13 season, Kingma played in the Netherlands for the GasTerra Flames (also known as Donar) in the Dutch Basketball League. He had already tried out for the team in 2004. In 2013 and 2014. He played for the Rockhampton Rockets, winning championships in both years. He returned to the Rockets for the 2015 season.

== National team career ==
Kingma played in 25 games for the Netherlands national team, after making his debut on 20 August 2004 against Ukraine.

== Acting career ==
Outside of basketball, Kingma, along with fellow Australian basketballers Axel Dench, David Stiff and Julian Khazzouh, played a part in Star Wars: Episode III – Revenge of the Sith. Kingma played a Wookiee named Tarfful. The players were chosen as Wookiees for their height.

== Personal ==
Kingma has Dutch ancestors, which is why he holds a Dutch passport.
