= 2011 Queensland Basketball League season =

- League: Queensland Basketball League
- Sport: Basketball
- Duration: 7 May – 20 August
- Games: 18
- Teams: 14

Regular season
- Minor premiers: Mackay Meteors
- Season MVP: Tom Garlepp (Brisbane Capitals)
- Top scorer: Chris Goulding (Northside Wizards)

Finals
- Champions: Mackay Meteors
- Runners-up: Rockhampton Rockets
- Grand Final MVP: Deba George

QBL seasons
- ← 2010 2012 →

The 2011 Men's Queensland Basketball League season was the 26th running of the competition. The Mackay Meteors won the championship in 2011 to claim their first league title.

The teams for this season were: Brisbane Capitals, Bundaberg Bulls, Caboolture Suns, Cairns Marlins, Gladstone Port City Power, Gold Coast Rollers, Ipswich Force, Mackay Meteors, Maroochydore Clippers, Northside Wizards, Rockhampton Rockets, South West Metro Pirates, Toowoomba Mountaineers and Townsville Heat.

== Team information ==
Team	Home stadium
Brisbane Capitals	Vince Hickey Basketball Stadium
Bundaberg Bulls	WIN Stadium
Caboolture Suns	Morayfield Park Leisure Centre
Cairns Marlins	Bendigo Bank Stadium
Gladstone Port City Power	Kev Broome Stadium
Gold Coast Rollers	Carrara Indoor Stadium
Ipswich Force	Ipswich Basketball Stadium
Mackay Meteors	Candlestick Park
Maroochydore Clippers	Maroochydore Basketball Stadium
Northside Wizards	The Sports Centre Boondall
Rockhampton Rockets	Hegvold Stadium
South West Metro Pirates	Hibiscus Sports Complex
Toowoomba Mountaineers	USQ, Clive Berghofer Recreation Centre
Townsville Heat	QN Stadium

== Standings ==
#	Regular Season Standings			
#	Team	W	L	PCT
1	Mackay Meteors	15	3	83
2	Gold Coast Rollers	15	3	83
3	Townsville Heat	14	4	78
4	Northside Wizards	12	6	67
5	Rockhampton Rockets	12	6	67
6	Brisbane Capitals	11	7	61
7	Cairns Marlins	10	8	56
8	Ipswich Force	9	9	50
9	Bundaberg Bulls	9	9	50
10	Gladstone Port City Power	5	13	28
11	South West Metro Pirates	5	13	28
12	Toowoomba Mountaineers	5	13	28
13	Maroochydore Clippers	2	16	11
14	Caboolture Suns	2	16	11

=== Finals ===
#	Pool A
#	Team
1	Mackay Meteors*
3	Townsville Heat**
5	Rockhampton Rockets**
7	Cairns Marlins
10	Gladstone Port City Power

#	Pool B
#	Team
4	Northside Wizards**
6	Brisbane Capitals**
9	Bundaberg Bulls
13	Maroochydore Clippers
14	Caboolture Suns

#	Pool C
#	Team
2	Gold Coast Rollers**
8	Ipswich Force**
11	South West Metro Pirates
12	Toowoomba Mountaineers

*The team that finishes 1st overall goes straight through to the semi-finals.

**The top two teams from each pool face-off in the quarter-finals.

- QF 1: 1st in Pool A vs. 2nd in Pool A
- QF 2: 1st in Pool B vs. 2nd in Pool C
- QF 3: 1st in Pool C vs. 2nd in Pool B

Quarter-finals
2	Gold Coast Rollers	86
6	Brisbane Capitals	87
3	Townsville Heat	73
5	Rockhampton Rockets	85
4	Northside Wizards	88
8	Ipswich Force	66

Semi-finals
1	Mackay Meteors
6	Brisbane Capitals
5	Rockhampton Rockets	89
4	Northside Wizards	63

Grand Final
Mackay Meteors	100
Rockhampton Rockets	82

== Awards ==
=== Player of the Week ===
Round	Player	Team	Ref
1	James Legan	Toowoomba Mountaineers	
2	Deba George	Mackay Meteors	
3	Willie Shackleford	Bundaberg Bulls	
4	Adam Gibson	Gold Coast Rollers	
5	Tom Garlepp	Brisbane Capitals	
6	Travis Reed	Rockhampton Rockets	
7	Willie Shackleford	Bundaberg Bulls	
8	Scott McGregor	Gold Coast Rollers	
9	Ryan Stolberg	Ipswich Force	
10	Tim Coenraad	Mackay Meteors	
11	Tom Garlepp	Brisbane Capitals	
12	James Legan	Toowoomba Mountaineers	
13	Tim Coenraad	Mackay Meteors	
14	Chris Goulding	Northside Wizards	

=== Coach of the Month ===
Month	Coach	Team	Ref
May	Mick Conlon	Gold Coast Rollers	
June	Neal Tweedy	Rockhampton Rockets	
July	Grant Kruger	Mackay Meteors	

=== Statistics leaders ===
Category	Player	Team	Stat
Points per game	Chris Goulding	Northside Wizards	30.5
Rebounds per game	Willie Shackleford	Bundaberg Bulls	17.67
Assists per game	Josh Black	Ipswich Force	5.88
Steals per game	Mitch Philp	Rockhampton Rockets	2.43
Blocks per game	James Cripe	Gladstone Port City Power	1.94
Field goal percentage	Tim Behrendorff	Ipswich Force	71.43%
3-pt field goal percentage	Deba George	Mackay Meteors	44.85%
Free throw percentage	David Gurney	Gold Coast Rollers	84.71%

=== Regular season ===
- Most Valuable Player: Tom Garlepp (Brisbane Capitals)
- Coach of the Year: Mick Conlon (Gold Coast Rollers)
- U23 Youth Player of the Year: Todd Blanchfield (Townsville Heat)
- All-League Team:
  - G: Rhys Martin (Mackay Meteors)
  - G: Shaun Gleeson (Ipswich Force)
  - F: Tom Garlepp (Brisbane Capitals)
  - F: Todd Blanchfield (Townsville Heat)
  - C: Willie Shackleford (Bundaberg Bulls)

=== Finals ===
- Grand Final MVP: Deba George (Mackay Meteors)
