= 2010 Queensland Basketball League season =

- League: Queensland Basketball League
- Sport: Basketball
- Duration: 24 April – 21 August
- Games: 18
- Teams: 14

Regular season
- Minor premiers: Rockhampton Rockets
- Season MVP: Daniel Egan (Townsville Heat)
- Top scorer: Matthew Hanson (Bundaberg Bulls)

Finals
- Champions: Rockhampton Rockets
- Runners-up: Mackay Meteors
- Grand Final MVP: Peni Nasalo

QBL seasons
- ← 2009 2011 →

The 2010 Men's Queensland Basketball League season was the 25th running of the competition. The Rockhampton Rockets won the championship in 2010 to claim their third league title.

The teams for this season were: Brisbane Capitals, Bundaberg Bulls, Caboolture Suns, Cairns Marlins, Gladstone Port City Power, Gold Coast Goannas, Ipswich Force, Mackay Meteors, Maroochydore Clippers, Northside Wizards, Rockhampton Rockets, South West Metro Pirates, Toowoomba Mountaineers and Townsville Heat.

== Team information ==
Team	Home stadium
Brisbane Capitals	Vince Hickey Basketball Stadium
Bundaberg Bulls	Century 21 Stadium
Caboolture Suns	Morayfield Park Leisure Centre
Cairns Marlins	Bendigo Bank Basketball Centre
Gladstone Port City Power	Kev Broome Stadium
Gold Coast Goannas	Tallebudgera Leisure Centre; Carrara Indoor Stadium
Ipswich Force	Ipswich Basketball Stadium
Mackay Meteors	Candlestick Park
Maroochydore Clippers	Maroochydore Basketball Stadium
Northside Wizards	The Sports Centre Boondall; South Pine Sports Complex
Rockhampton Rockets	Hegvold Stadium
South West Metro Pirates	Hibiscus Sports Complex
Toowoomba Mountaineers	Toowoomba Basketball Stadium
Townsville Heat	NPA Stadium

== Standings ==
#	Regular Season Standings			
#	Team	W	L	PCT
1	Rockhampton Rockets	16	2	89
2	Mackay Meteors	15	3	83
3	Townsville Heat	12	6	67
4	Cairns Marlins	12	6	67
5	Northside Wizards	12	6	67
6	South West Metro Pirates	11	7	61
7	Gold Coast Goannas	10	8	56
8	Maroochydore Clippers	9	9	50
9	Ipswich Force	8	10	44
10	Bundaberg Bulls	7	11	39
11	Caboolture Suns	5	13	28
12	Gladstone Port City Power	5	13	28
13	Brisbane Capitals	4	14	22
14	Toowoomba Mountaineers	0	18	0

=== Finals ===
#	Pool A
#	Team
1	Rockhampton Rockets*
2	Mackay Meteors**
3	Townsville Heat**
4	Cairns Marlins
12	Gladstone Port City Power

#	Pool B
#	Team
5	Northside Wizards**
8	Maroochydore Clippers**
10	Bundaberg Bulls
11	Caboolture Suns
13	Brisbane Capitals

#	Pool C
#	Team
6	South West Metro Pirates**
7	Gold Coast Goannas**
9	Ipswich Force
14	Toowoomba Mountaineers

*The team that finishes 1st overall goes straight through to the semi-finals.

**The top two teams from each pool face-off in the quarter-finals.

- QF 1: 1st in Pool A vs. 2nd in Pool A
- QF 2: 1st in Pool B vs. 2nd in Pool C
- QF 3: 1st in Pool C vs. 2nd in Pool B

Quarter-finals
5	Northside Wizards	81
7	Gold Coast Goannas	91
2	Mackay Meteors	83
3	Townsville Heat	78
6	SW Metro Pirates	126
8	Maroochydore Clippers	95

Semi-finals
1	Rockhampton Rockets	87
7	Gold Coast Goannas	48
2	Mackay Meteors	90
6	SW Metro Pirates	81

Grand Final
Rockhampton Rockets	74
Mackay Meteors	63

== Awards ==
=== Statistics leaders ===
Category	Player	Team	Stat
Points per game	Matthew Hanson	Bundaberg Bulls	29.89
Rebounds per game	Ryan McDade	Rockhampton Rockets	15.2
Assists per game	Todd Meyerding	Bundaberg Bulls	5.85
Steals per game	John Fitzgerald	Mackay Meteors	2.88
Blocks per game	Anthony Petrie	Northside Wizards	1.38
Field goal percentage	Keiren Bairstow	South West Metro Pirates	64.20%
3-pt field goal percentage	Shane Davis	Northside Wizards	44.74%
Free throw percentage	Zane Meehl	Maroochydore Clippers	91.46%

=== Regular season ===
- Most Valuable Player: Daniel Egan (Townsville Heat)
- Coach of the Year: Leonard King (Mackay Meteors)
- U23 Youth Player of the Year: Jeromie Hill (Cairns Marlins)
- All-League Team:
  - G: Rhys Martin (Mackay Meteors)
  - G: Chris Goulding (Northside Wizards)
  - F: Matthew Hanson (Bundaberg Bulls)
  - F: Daniel Egan (Townsville Heat)
  - C: Ryan McDade (Rockhampton Rockets)

=== Finals ===
- Grand Final MVP: Peni Nasalo (Rockhampton Rockets)
