= Matthew Adekponya =

Australian-Ghanaian basketball player (born 1990)

Personal information
- Born: 9 June 1990 (age 36)
- Listed height: 194 cm (6 ft 4 in)

Career information
- Playing career: 2009–2021
- Position: Guard

Career history
- 2009–2012: Cairns Marlins
- 2013–2015: Mackay Meteors
- 2013–2014: Barcelos Hotel Terco
- 2014: PAVI Depiro
- 2014–2015: Nidaros Jets
- 2016: Geraldton Buccaneers
- 2017: Team FOG Næstved
- 2017: Perry Lakes Hawks
- 2018: Gold Coast Rollers
- 2021: Mackay Meteors

Career highlights
- Danish Cup winner (2017); 2× QBL champion (2009, 2015); SBL All-Star Five (2016); BLNO All-Star (2015); BLNO scoring champion (2015)

Matthew Kwame Adekponya (born 9 June 1990) is an Australian-born Ghanaian filmmaker and former basketball player.

He played in the Queensland Basketball League (QBL) every year between 2009 and 2015, winning QBL championships with the Cairns Marlins (2009) and Mackay Meteors (2015). After two years in the State Basketball League (SBL) in Western Australia, he returned to the QBL in 2018 and then had a stint in the NBL1 North in 2021. Elsewhere, he played in Europe between 2013 and 2017.

== Early life ==
Adekponya was born in Australia and grew up in Cairns, Queensland. He attended Lindsey Wilson College in the United States in 2010–11 but did not play for the basketball team.

== Basketball career ==
=== Australia ===
Adekponya made his debut in the Queensland Basketball League (QBL) in 2009 with the Cairns Marlins. The team won the QBL championship in his first season. He played for the Marlins every year until 2012. During this time, he was a development player with the Cairns Taipans in the National Basketball League (NBL). He failed to make his NBL debut during his two-year stint in 2011–12 and 2012–13.

Between 2013 and 2015, Adekponya played for the Mackay Meteors. He helped the Meteors win the 2015 QBL championship.

Adekponya spent time with the Townsville Crocodiles during the 2014 and 2015 NBL pre-seasons.

In 2016, Adekponya played for the Geraldton Buccaneers in the State Basketball League (SBL) and earned All-Star Five honours. He continued in the SBL for the Perry Lakes Hawks in 2017.

Adekponya returned to the QBL in 2018 to play for the Gold Coast Rollers.

In May 2021, Adekponya had a two-game stint with the Mackay Meteors in the NBL1 North as a short-term replacement for an injured player.

=== Europe ===
Adekponya's first stint in Europe came in the 2013–14 season. After nearly two months trialling in Spain, he joined Barcelos Hotel Terco in Portugal in October 2013. He moved to Malta in January 2014 and helped PAVI Depiro win the regular season.

For the 2014–15 season, Adekponya played for Nidaros Jets in Norway, where he earned BLNO All-Star honours and was the league's top scorer with 30.2 points per game.

After attempting to crack the NBA D-League in 2016, Adekponya joined Team FOG Næstved in Denmark in January 2017 for the rest of the season.

== Digital career ==
Off the court, Adekponya is a filmmaker. In 2017, he released his first documentary.

During the 2019–20 NBL season, Adekponya worked with the Illawarra Hawks as digital content creator. The Hawks subsequently won the NBL's Best Digital/Social Media award.

Adekponya was the director of Building Titans, a film based on rugby league club the Gold Coast Titans.

As of March 2022, Adekponya was working on a documentary highlighting the bronze medal won by the Australian Boomers at the Tokyo Olympics. He is close with Australian Boomer Patty Mills.

== Personal life ==
Adekponya's sister, Rachel, is married to former NBA player Aron Baynes.
