= Dusty Rychart =

Australian-American basketball player

No. 45 – Brisbane Capitals
- Position: Power forward / center
- League: Queensland Basketball League

Personal information
- Born: 11 August 1978 (age 48) Grand Rapids, Minnesota
- Listed height: 6 ft 7 in (2.01 m)
- Listed weight: 220 lb (100 kg)

Career information
- High school: Grand Rapids (Grand Rapids, Minnesota)
- College: Minnesota (1998–2002)
- NBA draft: 2002: undrafted
- Playing career: 2002–present

Career history
- 2002: Victoria Giants
- 2003–2006: Adelaide 36ers
- 2005: Hawke's Bay Hawks
- 2006–2008: Brisbane Bullets
- 2007: North Adelaide Rockets
- 2008: Brisbane Capitals
- 2008–2009: Wollongong Hawks
- 2009–2013: Cairns Taipans
- 2012: Cairns Marlins
- 2013–present: Brisbane Capitals

Career highlights
- NBL champion (2007); All-NBL Second Team (2005); All-NBL Third Team (2006); 2× QBL All-League Team (2013, 2015); Central ABL champion (2007); Central ABL All-Star Five (2007); Woollacott Medal winner (2007); Third-team All-Big Ten (2002)

Dusty Mike Rychart (born 11 August 1978) is an Australian-American professional basketball player for the Brisbane Capitals of the Queensland Basketball League (QBL).

== College career ==
Rychart attended the University of Minnesota in Minneapolis where he walked on to the basketball team for the 1997–98 season. After redshirting his freshman year, Rychart became the backbone of the Minnesota Gophers for four seasons. While not considered flashy or high profile, Rychart was a workhorse, withstanding an academic scandal, a coaching change, sanctions, numerous players coming and going, but still managed to come out on top. As a senior in 2001–02, he earned third-team All-Big Ten honors. In 111 career games over four years, Rychart averaged 11.4 points, 6.6 rebounds and 1.5 assists per game.

== Professional career ==
After going undrafted in the 2002 NBA draft, Rychart joined the Minnesota Timberwolves NBA Summer League team. He later moved to Australia and joined the Victoria Giants for the 2002–03 NBL season. However, in December 2002, he parted ways the Giants and moved to the Adelaide 36ers the following month, signing for the rest of the season. He made his debut for the 36ers on 29 January 2003, and continued on with Adelaide for a further three seasons, recording his best season in 2004–05 with averages of 21.4 points and 10.8 rebounds per game. During the Australian NBL off-season in 2005, Rychart played for the Hawke's Bay Hawks of the New Zealand NBL.

In March 2006, Rychart signed a two-year deal with the Brisbane Bullets. In his first year as a Bullet, he became a championship player after Brisbane defeated the Melbourne Tigers in the grand final series. During the 2007 off-season, he played for the North Adelaide Rockets where he was awarded the Woollacott Medal and earned Central ABL All-Star Five honors, a season in which he helped the Rockets win the Central ABL championship.

Following the 2007–08 season, the Bullets disbanded, leaving Rychart without a team. After a stint in the QBL with the Brisbane Capitals, the Wollongong Hawks nabbed him in July 2008 and signed him up for one season.

After gaining Australia citizenship in June 2009, Rychart moved north and signed with the Cairns Taipans as a local. After two productive seasons in Cairns, injuries began to tarnish Rychart's decorative NBL career as he stumbled through the 2011–12 and 2012–13 seasons, managing just 29 games over his last two seasons. In 309 career NBL games, he averaged 15.1 points, 8.0 rebounds and 1.6 assists per game.

After returning to the QBL in 2012 with the Cairns Marlins, Rychart re-joined the Brisbane Capitals in 2013 and earned All-League honors for the first time. He returned to the Capitals in 2014 and averaged 16.8 points and a career-high 13.1 rebounds per game. His 2015 season saw his points production decrease as the Capitals made it back to the playoffs as the No. 2 seed. Rychart continued on with the Capitals in 2016 and 2017. Rychart was ruled out of the entire 2018 season with a knee injury.
