= Braydon Hobbs =

American basketball player

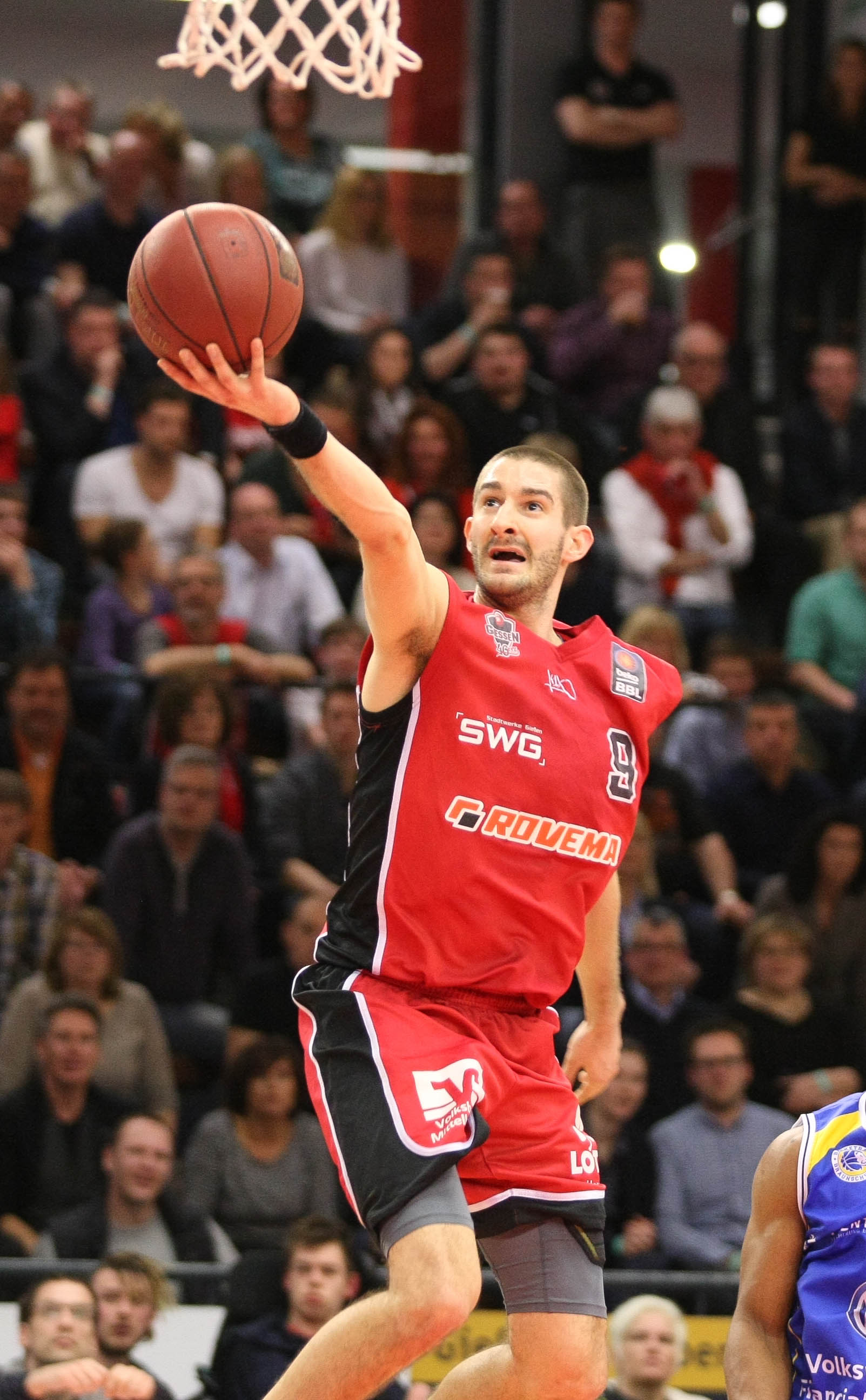
- Hobbs with Gießen 46ers in 2016

Personal information
- Born: May 17, 1989 (age 36) New Albany, Indiana, U.S.
- Listed height: 196 cm (6 ft 5 in)
- Listed weight: 84 kg (185 lb)

Career information
- High school: New Albany (New Albany, Indiana)
- College: Bellarmine (2008–2012)
- NBA draft: 2012: undrafted
- Playing career: 2012–2023
- Position: Point guard / shooting guard
- Number: 33

Career history
- 2012: Mackay Meteors
- 2012–2013: Cáceres Ciudad del Baloncesto
- 2013: Gladstone Port City Power
- 2013–2014: Alba Fehérvár
- 2014–2015: Nürnberger BC
- 2015: Mackay Meteors
- 2015–2016: Gießen 46ers
- 2016–2017: Ulm
- 2017–2019: Bayern Munich
- 2019–2021: Oldenburg
- 2021–2022: Monbus Obradoiro
- 2022–2023: Braunschweig

Career highlights
- 2× QBL champion (2012, 2015); QBL Grand Final MVP (2015); 2× QBL All-League Team (2013, 2015); ProA Player of the Year (2015); NCAA Division II champion (2011); NABC Division II Player of the Year (2012); GLVC Player of the Year (2012); GLVC All-Defensive Team (2012); 2× First-team All-GLVC (2011, 2012); 2× Third-team All-GLVC (2009, 2010); GLVC Freshman of the Year (2009)

Braydon Alexander Hobbs (born May 17, 1989) is a retired American professional basketball player. He played four seasons of college basketball for Bellarmine University where he was a key member of the Knights' 2011 championship winning team, helping the school claim their first NCAA Division II National Championship. He played professionally in Europe and Australia, winning two QBL championships with the Mackay Meteors in 2012 and 2015. Hobbs spent most of his professional career playing in Germany.

== High school career ==
Hobbs attended New Albany High School in New Albany, Indiana where he played for coach Jim Shannon and became New Albany's all-time assists leader. As a senior in 2007–08, he averaged 16 points, 5.2 rebounds and 6.4 assists per game, and became the first Bulldog to record a triple-double. He has earned Associated Press second-team All-State honors and was named the New Albany Tribune's Player of the Year.

== College career ==
As a freshman at Bellarmine in 2008–09, Hobbs earned Great Lakes Valley Conference Freshman of the Year and third-team All-GLVC honors after averaging 12.8 points per game. He started all 33 games in the backcourt, averaging 32.6 minutes per contest.

As a sophomore in 2009–10, Hobbs earned third-team All-GLVC honors for the second straight year. He started all 32 games during the season and finished third on the team in scoring with 11.6 points per game. He and running mate Jeremy Kendle formed a formidable backcourt in their first year together, going on to help the Knights win the 2010 GLVC Tournament.

As a junior in 2010–11, Hobbs earned first-team All-GLVC honors after averaging 12.5 points, 4.7 rebounds, and 6.5 assists per game. He also garnered Honorable Mention All-America honors by D-II Bulletin, and was named first-team All-Region by Daktronics and first-team All-District by the NABC. Hobbs helped lead Bellarmine to a 30–2 record and a trip to the NCAA Division II Elite 8 for the first time in school history. He went on to lead them even further as the Knights won their first NCAA Division II National Championship in 2010–11.

As a senior in 2011–12, Hobbs was named the Division II National Player of the Year by Basketball Times, becoming the first Bellarmine player to win the prestigious national player of the year award. He also joined teammate Jeremy Kendle on the All-America First Team. Hobbs once again led the Knights back to the NCAA Division II Final Four and earned first-team All-GLVC honors. In 33 games for the Knights in 2011–12, Hobbs averaged 12.2 points, 3.7 rebounds, 5.7 assists, 1.2 blocks and 1.9 steals per game.

In his four-year career at Bellarmine, Hobbs never missed a game, starting in all 133 contests, helping turn the Bellarmine program into a national collegiate powerhouse.

== Professional career ==
After leaving Bellarmine with a degree in criminal justice, Hobbs moved to Australia and joined the Mackay Meteors for the 2012 Queensland Basketball League season. He led the league in three-point percentage with 44.11%, and helped the Meteors win back-to-back championships for the first time in club history. In 17 games for Mackay, he averaged 13.9 points, 6.2 rebounds, 5.1 assists and 1.9 steals per game.

In August 2012, following the conclusion of the QBL season, Hobbs signed with Cáceres Ciudad del Baloncesto of Spain for the 2012–13 season. In 35 games for Cáceres, he averaged 7.1 points, 2.8 rebounds, 1.9 assists and 1.6 steals per game.

In May 2013, Hobbs returned to Queensland, signing with the Gladstone Port City Power for the 2013 QBL season. In 12 games for Gladstone, he averaged 22.3 points, 8.1 rebounds, 6.0 assists and 2.4 steals per game. He earned numerous accolades in 2013 as he won the three-point percentage title again (45.69%), led the league in assists, and was named to the All-League Team.

In August 2013, following the conclusion of the QBL season, Hobbs signed a one-year deal with Alba Fehérvár of Hungary. In 32 league games for Alba, Hobbs averaged 9.1 points, 4.2 rebounds and 3.4 assists per game.

On August 7, 2014, Hobbs signed with Nürnberger BC for the 2014–15 ProA season. In 38 games for NBC, he averaged 11.9 points, 4.1 rebounds, 5.9 assists and 1.9 steals per game, and subsequently earned league Player of the Year honors.

In April 2015, Hobbs signed with the Mackay Meteors for the 2015 QBL season, returning to the club for a second stint. His former college teammate, Jeremy Kendle, also ventured to Queensland and joined rival team the Toowoomba Mountaineers. Hobbs had another great season in the QBL, earning All-League Team honors for a second time and was named the Grand Final MVP after helping the Meteors reclaim the QBL championship. In 18 games for the Meteors in 2015, he averaged 14.7 points, 5.8 rebounds, 4.8 assists and 1.2 steals per game.

On June 9, 2015, Hobbs signed with the Gießen 46ers of the German Basketball Bundesliga. In 33 games for Gießen in 2015–16, he averaged 10.5 points, 5.2 rebounds, 4.8 assists and 1.7 steals per game, helping the team to a 17–17 record that year.

On June 17, 2016, Hobbs signed with Ratiopharm Ulm, returning to Germany for a second stint. He led the team in assists (5.4apg), while also averaging 7.1 points, 3 rebounds and 1.3 steals per game during the 2016–17 Basketball Bundesliga season, en route to the regular season crown and an appearance in the playoff semifinals. Hobbs also made 14 appearances during the 2015–16 EuroCup campaign, scoring 7.3 points, dishing out 4.7 assists and pulling down 2.8 rebounds per game.

On July 4, 2017, Hobbs signed a two-year deal with German club Bayern Munich.

On July 1, 2019, Hobbs signed a two-year contract with EWE Baskets Oldenburg of the German Bundesliga.

On July 2, 2021, he has signed with Monbus Obradoiro of the Spanish Liga ACB.

In August 2022, Hobbs returned to the German Bundesliga, penning a deal with Basketball Löwen Braunschweig. In March 2023, he had a shoulder surgery. Hobbs retired from professional basketball following the 2022–23 season.
