= 2012 Queensland Basketball League season =

- League: Queensland Basketball League
- Sport: Basketball
- Duration: 11 May – 1 September
- Games: 16
- Teams: 13

Regular season
- Minor premiers: Rockhampton Rockets
- Season MVP: Michael Cedar (Mackay Meteors)
- Top scorer: Shaun Gleeson (Ipswich Force)

Finals
- Champions: Mackay Meteors
- Runners-up: Rockhampton Rockets
- Grand Final MVP: Michael Cedar

QBL seasons
- ← 2011 2013 →

The 2012 Men's Queensland Basketball League season was the 27th running of the competition. The Mackay Meteors won the championship in 2012 to claim their second league title.

The teams for this season were: Brisbane Capitals, Bundaberg Bulls, Cairns Marlins, Gladstone Port City Power, Gold Coast Rollers, Ipswich Force, Mackay Meteors, Maroochydore Clippers, Northside Wizards, Rockhampton Rockets, South West Metro Pirates, Toowoomba Mountaineers and Townsville Heat.

== Team information ==
Team	Home stadium
Brisbane Capitals	NAB Stadium
Bundaberg Bulls	WIN Stadium
Cairns Marlins	Bendigo Bank Stadium
Gladstone Port City Power	Kev Broome Stadium
Gold Coast Rollers	The Southport School
Ipswich Force	Cotton On Foundation Stadium
Mackay Meteors	Candlestick Park
Maroochydore Clippers	Maroochydore Basketball Stadium
Northside Wizards	South Pine Sports Complex
Rockhampton Rockets	Hegvold Stadium
South West Metro Pirates	Hibiscus Sports Complex
Toowoomba Mountaineers	USQ, Clive Berghofer Recreation Centre
Townsville Heat	Townsville Basketball Stadium

== Standings ==
#	Regular Season Standings			
#	Team	W	L	PCT
1	Rockhampton Rockets	13	3	81
2	Mackay Meteors	12	4	75
3	Ipswich Force	12	4	75
4	Cairns Marlins	11	5	69
5	Townsville Heat	10	6	63
6	Gold Coast Rollers	9	7	56
7	Northside Wizards	9	7	56
8	South West Metro Pirates	8	8	50
9	Bundaberg Bulls	5	11	31
10	Brisbane Capitals	4	12	25
11	Gladstone Port City Power	4	12	25
12	Toowoomba Mountaineers	4	12	25
13	Maroochydore Clippers	3	13	19

=== Finals ===
#	Pool A
#	Team
1	Rockhampton Rockets*
2	Mackay Meteors**
4	Cairns Marlins**
5	Townsville Heat
11	Gladstone Port City Power

#	Pool B
#	Team
7	Northside Wizards**
9	Bundaberg Bulls**
10	Brisbane Capitals
13	Maroochydore Clippers

#	Pool C
#	Team
3	Ipswich Force**
6	Gold Coast Rollers**
8	South West Metro Pirates
12	Toowoomba Mountaineers

*The team that finishes 1st overall goes straight through to the semi-finals.

**The top two teams from each pool face-off in the quarter-finals.

- QF 1: 1st in Pool A vs. 2nd in Pool A
- QF 2: 1st in Pool B vs. 2nd in Pool C
- QF 3: 1st in Pool C vs. 2nd in Pool B

Quarter-finals
7	Northside Wizards	58
6	Gold Coast Rollers	72
2	Mackay Meteors	106
4	Cairns Marlins	75
3	Ipswich Force	100
9	Bundaberg Bulls	85

Semi-finals
1	Rockhampton Rockets	86
6	Gold Coast Rollers	67
2	Mackay Meteors	88
3	Ipswich Force	75

Grand Final
Rockhampton Rockets	58
Mackay Meteors	72

== Awards ==
=== Player of the Week ===
Round	Player	Team	Ref
1	Louis Hurd	Northside Wizards	
2	Zarryon Fereti	Ipswich Force	
3	Todd Blanchfield	Townsville Heat	
4	Ryan McDade	Rockhampton Rockets	
5	James Legan	Toowoomba Mountaineers	
6	David Gurney	Gold Coast Rollers	
7	Mitch Philp	Rockhampton Rockets	
8	James Legan	Toowoomba Mountaineers	
9	Shaun Gleeson	Ipswich Force	
10	Willie Shackleford	Bundaberg Bulls	
11	Todd Blanchfield	Townsville Heat	
12	Mitch Norton	Townsville Heat	
13	Ben Allen	Ipswich Force	
14	Robert Lippman	South West Metro Pirates	

=== Coach of the Month ===
Month	Coach	Team	Ref
May/June	Liam Flynn	Townsville Heat	
June/July	Grant Kruger	Mackay Meteors	
July/August	Darryn Roche	Bundaberg Bulls	

=== Statistics leaders ===
Category	Player	Team	Stat
Points per game	Shaun Gleeson	Ipswich Force	24.18
Rebounds per game	Willie Shackleford	Bundaberg Bulls	16.75
Assists per game	Mitch Philp	Rockhampton Rockets	7.19
Steals per game	Nathan Calder	Gladstone Port City Power	2.06
Blocks per game	Chad Wynn	Toowoomba Mountaineers	1.73
Field goal percentage	Travis Reed	Rockhampton Rockets	61.20%
3-pt field goal percentage	Braydon Hobbs	Mackay Meteors	44.11%
Free throw percentage	Todd Blanchfield	Townsville Heat	88.37%

=== Regular season ===
- Most Valuable Player: Michael Cedar (Mackay Meteors)
- Coach of the Year: Neal Tweedy (Rockhampton Rockets)
- U23 Youth Player of the Year: Todd Blanchfield (Townsville Heat)
- All-League Team:
  - G: Shaun Gleeson (Ipswich Force)
  - G: Mitch Philp (Rockhampton Rockets)
  - F: Todd Blanchfield (Townsville Heat)
  - F: Aaron Grabau (Cairns Marlins)
  - C: Travis Reed (Rockhampton Rockets)

=== Finals ===
- Grand Final MVP: Michael Cedar (Mackay Meteors)
