= 2014 Queensland Basketball League season =

- League: Queensland Basketball League
- Sport: Basketball
- Duration: 3 May – 30 August
- Games: 16
- Teams: 13

Regular season
- Minor premiers: Rockhampton Rockets
- Season MVP: Chehales Tapscott (Rockhampton Rockets)
- Top scorer: Chehales Tapscott (Rockhampton Rockets)

Finals
- Champions: Rockhampton Rockets
- Runners-up: Mackay Meteors

QBL seasons
- ← 2013 2015 →

The 2014 Men's Queensland Basketball League season was the 29th running of the competition. The Rockhampton Rockets won the championship in 2014 to claim their fifth league title.

The teams for this season were: Brisbane Capitals, Bundaberg Bulls, Cairns Marlins, Gladstone Port City Power, Gold Coast Rollers, Ipswich Force, Mackay Meteors, Northside Wizards, Rockhampton Rockets, South West Metro Pirates, Suncoast Clippers, Toowoomba Mountaineers and Townsville Heat.

== Team information ==
Team	Home stadium
Brisbane Capitals	NAB Stadium
Bundaberg Bulls	WIN Stadium
Cairns Marlins	Bendigo Bank Stadium
Gladstone Port City Power	Kev Broome Stadium
Gold Coast Rollers	The Southport School
Ipswich Force	Cotton On Foundation Stadium
Mackay Meteors	Candlestick Park
Northside Wizards	South Pine Sports Complex
Rockhampton Rockets	Hegvold Stadium
South West Metro Pirates	Hibiscus Sports Complex
Suncoast Clippers	Maroochydore Basketball Stadium
Toowoomba Mountaineers	USQ, Clive Berghofer Recreation Centre
Townsville Heat	Townsville Basketball Stadium

== Standings ==
#	Regular Season Standings			
#	Team	W	L	PCT
1	Rockhampton Rockets	14	2	88
2	Mackay Meteors	13	3	81
3	Cairns Marlins	13	3	81
4	Brisbane Capitals	10	6	63
5	Ipswich Force	10	6	63
6	Bundaberg Bulls	9	7	56
7	South West Metro Pirates	9	7	56
8	Northside Wizards	8	8	50
9	Townsville Heat	6	10	38
10	Suncoast Clippers	6	10	38
11	Gold Coast Rollers	4	12	25
12	Gladstone Port City Power	1	15	6
13	Toowoomba Mountaineers	1	15	6

=== Finals ===
#	Pool A
#	Team
1	Rockhampton Rockets*
2	Mackay Meteors**
3	Cairns Marlins**
9	Townsville Heat
12	Gladstone Port City Power

#	Pool B
#	Team
4	Brisbane Capitals**
6	Bundaberg Bulls**
8	Northside Wizards
10	Suncoast Clippers

#	Pool C
#	Team
5	Ipswich Force**
7	South West Metro Pirates**
11	Gold Coast Rollers
13	Toowoomba Mountaineers

*The team that finishes 1st overall goes straight through to the semi-finals.

**The top two teams from each pool face-off in the quarter-finals.

- QF 1: 1st in Pool A vs. 2nd in Pool A
- QF 2: 1st in Pool B vs. 2nd in Pool C
- QF 3: 1st in Pool C vs. 2nd in Pool B

Quarter-finals
5	Ipswich Force	88	X	X
6	Bundaberg Bulls	71	X	X
2	Mackay Meteors	83	X	X
3	Cairns Marlins	68	X	X
4	Brisbane Capitals	96	X	X
7	South West Metro Pirates	63	X	X

Semi-finals
1	Rockhampton Rockets	115	X	X
5	Ipswich Force	97	X	X
2	Mackay Meteors	97	X	X
4	Brisbane Capitals	87	X	X

Grand Final
Rockhampton Rockets	105	104	X
Mackay Meteors	91	94	X

== Awards ==
=== Player of the Week ===
Round	Player	Team	Ref
1	Chehales Tapscott	Rockhampton Rockets	
2	Chehales Tapscott	Rockhampton Rockets	
3	Mitchell Young	Cairns Marlins	
4	Damon Heuir	Mackay Meteors	
5	N/A (Note: Due to the Basketball Queensland Annual Conference and Awards events being held that weekend, Round 5 was a short round.)		
6	Mike Carlson	South West Metro Pirates	
7	Kyle Harvey	Ipswich Force	
8	Kahlil McDonald	Suncoast Clippers	
9	Ray Turner	Rockhampton Rockets	
10	Chehales Tapscott	Rockhampton Rockets	
11	Alex Herrera	South West Metro Pirates	
12	Mitch McCarron	Northside Wizards	
13	Mike Carlson	South West Metro Pirates	
14	Dusty Rychart	Brisbane Capitals	
15	Kyle Harvey	Ipswich Force	

=== Coach of the Month ===
Month	Coach	Team	Ref
May	Jamie Pearlman	Cairns Marlins	
June	Darryn Roche	Bundaberg Bulls	
July	N/A		

=== Statistics leaders ===
Category	Player	Team	Stat
Points per game	Chehales Tapscott	Rockhampton Rockets	30.25
Rebounds per game	Willie Shackleford	Bundaberg Bulls	19.18
Assists per game	Jason Ralph	Ipswich Force	7.06
Steals per game	Willie Farley	Toowoomba Mountaineers	2.84
Blocks per game	Alex Herrera	South West Metro Pirates	2
Field goal percentage	Matt Smith	Cairns Marlins	65.51%
3-pt field goal percentage	Glenn Scott	Rockhampton Rockets	47.91%
Free throw percentage	Zarryon Fereti	Ipswich Force	93.93%

=== Regular season ===
- Most Valuable Player: Chehales Tapscott (Rockhampton Rockets)
- Coach of the Year: Neal Tweedy (Rockhampton Rockets)
- U23 Youth Player of the Year: Mitch McCarron (Northside Wizards)
- All-League Team:
  - G: James Legan (Ipswich Force)
  - G: Shaun Bruce (Cairns Marlins)
  - F: Chehales Tapscott (Rockhampton Rockets)
  - F: Todd Blanchfield (Mackay Meteors)
  - C: Ray Turner (Rockhampton Rockets)

=== Finals ===
- Grand Final Game 2 MVP: Ray Turner (Rockhampton Rockets)
