= Bellarmine Knights men's basketball statistical leaders =

The Bellarmine Knights men's basketball statistical leaders are individual statistical leaders of the Bellarmine Knights men's basketball program in various categories, including points, rebounds, assists, steals, and blocks. Within those areas, the lists identify single-game, single-season, and career leaders. The Knights represent Bellarmine University in the NCAA Division I Atlantic Sun Conference.

Bellarmine began competing in intercollegiate basketball in 1950. The NCAA has recorded scoring statistics throughout the "modern era" of basketball, which it defines as starting with the 1937–38 season, the first after the center jump after each made field goal was abolished. Individual rebounding was first recorded in 1950–51, as were individual assists. While rebounding has been recorded in every subsequent season, the NCAA stopped recording individual assists after the 1951–52 season. Assists were not reinstated as an official statistic in Division I until the 1983–84 season. Blocks and steals were first recorded in D-I in 1988–89. Bellarmine's record books include players in all named statistics, regardless of whether they were officially recorded by the NCAA or any other national governing body.

These lists are updated through the end of the 2023–24 season.

== Scoring ==
Career
Rk	Player	Points	Seasons
1	Steve Mercer	1,969	1993–94 1994–95 1995–96 1996–97
2	Floyd Smith	1,932	1973–74 1974–75 1975–76 1976–77
3	Tom Schurfranz	1,868	1987–88 1988–89 1989–90 1990–91 1991–92
4	Adam Eberhard	1,860	2015–16 2016–17 2017–18 2018–19
5	Jeremy Kendle	1,792	2009–10 2010–11 2011–12
6	Chris Dowe	1,731	2009–10 2010–11 2011–12 2012–13
7	Rudy Montgomery	1,723	1955–56 1956–57 1957–58 1958–59 1959–60
8	Rusty Troutman	1,715	2013–14 2014–15 2015–16 2016–17
9	Braydon Hobbs	1,637	2008–09 2009–10 2010–11 2011–12
10	Clint Davis	1,602	1983–84 1984–85 1985–86 1986–87

Season
Rk	Player	Points	Season
1	Floyd Smith	701	1976–77
2	Jake Thelen	651	2014–15
3	Jack Karasinski	650	2025–26
4	Jeremy Kendle	635	2011–12
5	Tom Schurfranz	621	1990–91
6	Adam Eberhard	612	2016–17
7	Tom Schurfranz	610	1991–92
8	Buddy Cox	600	1981–82
9	Steve Mercer	598	1995–96
10	Jeremy Kendle	591	2010–11

Single game
Rk	Player	Points	Season	Opponent
1	Rudy Montgomery	43	1959–60	Marian
	Matt Otte	43	2006–07	Lewis
3	Floyd Smith	42	1975–76	Transylvania
4	Mike Holmes	41	1987–88	IUPU-Fort Wayne
	Reggie Burcy	41	1988–89	Northern Kentucky
6	Rudy Montgomery	40	1958–59	Saint Joseph's
	Joe Reibel	40	1958–59	Saint Joseph's
	Ron Belton	40	1968–69	UW-Milwaukee
	Tom Schurfranz	40	1991–92	Ashland

== Rebounds ==
Career
Rk	Player	Rebounds	Seasons
1	Rudy Montgomery	1,345	1955–56 1956–57 1957–58 1958–59 1959–60
2	Mike Holmes	1,134	1984–85 1985–86 1986–87 1987–88
3	Tom Schurfranz	903	1987–88 1988–89 1989–90 1990–91 1991–92
4	Steve Mercer	873	1993–94 1994–95 1995–96 1996–97
5	John Linneman	829	1967–68 1968–69 1969–70 1970–71
6	Chris Renfroe	810	1974–75 1975–76 1976–77 1977–78
7	Tom Hugenberg	808	1961–62 1962–63 1963–64 1964–65
8	George Duncan	787	1970–71 1971–72 1972–73 1973–74
9	Adam Eberhard	779	2015–16 2016–17 2017–18 2018–19
10	Jim Hall	768	1972–73 1973–74 1974–75 1975–76

Season
Rk	Player	Rebounds	Season
1	Rudy Montgomery	422	1958–59
2	Jake Thelen	375	2014–15
3	Rudy Montgomery	371	1959–60
4	Mike Holmes	333	1987–88
5	Mike Holmes	330	1987–88
6	Ron Belton	329	1968–69
7	Rudy Montgomery	312	1957–58
8	Jim Schurfranz	302	1966–67
9	Mike Holmes	299	1985–86
10	Tom Schurfranz	288	1990–91

Single game
Rk	Player	Rebounds	Season	Opponent
1	Rudy Montgomery	35	1958–59	Villa Madonna
2	Mike Clark	29	1965–66	Tennessee A&I
3	Mike Clark	27	1967–68	Centre
4	Rudy Montgomery	26	1959–60	Saint Joseph's
5	Rudy Montgomery	23	1959–60	Transylvania
	Ron Belton	23	1968–69	Corpus Christi
	John Linneman	23	1970–71	Campbellsville
8	Tom Hugenberg	22	1963–64	Georgetown
	Jim Schurfranz	22	1965–66	Ill. Teachers College
	Mike Holmes	22	1987–88	Southern Indiana

== Assists ==
Career
Rk	Player	Assists	Seasons
1	Braydon Hobbs	725	2008–09 2009–10 2010–11 2011–12
2	Brandy Monks	652	1987–88 1988–89 1989–90 1990–91
3	Adam Eberhard	493	2015–16 2016–17 2017–18 2018–19
4	John Ellington	442	1988–89 1989–90 1990–91 1991–92
5	Brad Bixler	401	1995–96 1996–97 1997–98 1998–99 1999–00
6	Chris Dowe	358	2009–10 2010–11 2011–12 2012–13
7	Jeremy Kendle	357	2009–10 2010–11 2011–12
8	Dylan Penn	346	2018–19 2019–20 2020–21 2021–22
9	Rusty Troutman	337	2013–14 2014–15 2015–16 2016–17
10	Zach Miller	322	2000–01 2001–02 2002–03 2003–04

Season
Rk	Player	Assists	Season
1	Braydon Hobbs	228	2010–11
2	Braydon Hobbs	189	2011–12
3	Brandy Monks	188	1988–89
4	Chartrael Hall	186	2008–09
	Chris Whitehead	186	2014–15
6	Braydon Hobbs	171	2009–10
7	Brandy Monks	167	1990–91
8	Brandy Monks	166	1989–90
9	Dylan Penn	165	2021–22
10	Adam Eberhard	150	2017–18
	Adam Eberhard	150	2018–19

Single game
Rk	Player	Assists	Season	Opponent
1	Chartrael Hall	15	2008–09	NKU
2	Brandy Monks	14	1989–90	Ashland
3	Matt Miller	13	2005–06	Delta State
	Braydon Hobbs	13	2008–09	Drury
5	Braydon Hobbs	12	2010–11	UI-Spring
	Chris Whitehead	12	2014–15	Fla. Southern

== Steals ==
Career
Rk	Player	Steals	Seasons
1	Braydon Hobbs	220	2008–09 2009–10 2010–11 2011–12
2	Steve Mercer	154	1993–94 1994–95 1995–96 1996–97
3	Jared McCurry	147	1999–00 2000–01 2001–02
4	Chris Dowe	133	2009–10 2010–11 2011–12 2012–13
5	CJ Fleming	132	2017–18 2018–19 2019–20 2020–21 2021–22
6	Juston Betz	125	2018–19 2019–20 2020–21 2021–22 2022–23
7	Shawn McGee	120	1992–93 1993–94 1994–95 1995–96 1996–97
	Rusty Troutman	118	2013–14 2014–15 2015–16 2016–17
9	Chip Sivori	118	1993–94 1994–95 1995–96 1996–97
	Brad Bixler	118	1995–96 1996–97 1997–98 1998–99 1999–00

Season
Rk	Player	Steals	Season
1	Chris Whitehead	79	2014–15
2	Al Davis	61	2016–17
3	Matt Gladieux	60	1997–98
	Braydon Hobbs	60	2010–11
5	Braydon Hobbs	59	2011–12
6	Chartrael Hall	58	2008–09
7	Frankie Moore	57	1995–96
8	Braydon Hobbs	50	2008–09
9	Jared McCurry	49	1999–00
10	John Ellington	48	1991–92

Single game
Rk	Player	Steals	Season	Opponent
1	Jim Hall	8	1974–75	
2	Braydon Hobbs	7	2011–12	Southern Indiana
	Juston Betz	7	2022–23	FGCU
4	Braydon Hobbs	6	2011–12	Kentucky Wesleyan
	Chip Sivori	6	1996–97	Saint Joseph's
	Frankie Moore	6	1995–96	Marymount
	Frankie Moore	6	1995–96	Bahamas
	Shawn McGee	6	1993–94	IUPU-Ft. Wayne
	Adam Brames	6	2007–08	Indianapolis
	Chris Whitehead	6	2014–15	Maryville
	CJ Fleming	6	2017–18	McKendree
	Billy Smith	6	2024–25	Queens

== Blocks ==
Career
Rk	Player	Blocks	Seasons
1	George Suggs	187	2012–13 2013–14 2014–15 2015–16
2	Steve Mercer	163	1993–94 1994–95 1995–96 1996–97
3	Braydon Hobbs	96	2008–09 2009–10 2010–11 2011–12
4	Caleb Halcomb	94	2003–04
5	Alex Cook	85	2016–17 2017–18 2018–19 2019–20
6	Chris Dowe	79	2009–10 2010–11 2011–12 2012–13
7	Adam Eberhard	78	2015–16 2016–17 2017–18 2018–19
8	Ben Weyer	70	2016–17 2017–18 2018–19 2019–20
9	Tom Schurfranz	67	1987–88 1988–89 1989–90 1990–91 1991–92
10	Keisten Jones	66	2010–11 2011–12 2012–13 2013–14

Season
Rk	Player	Blocks	Season
1	Caleb Halcomb	94	2003–04
2	Tom Schurfranz	67	1991–92
3	George Suggs	60	2013–14
4	George Suggs	57	2014–15
5	George Suggs	55	2015–16
6	Steve Mercer	46	1995–96
7	Steve Mercer	44	1994–95
8	Steve Mercer	42	1996–97
9	Chris Dowe	40	2011–12
10	Braydon Hobbs	39	2011–12

Single game
Rk	Player	Blocks	Season	Opponent
1	Tom Schurfranz	10	1990–91	
2	Caleb Halcomb	8	2003–04	Winston-Salem
3	Braydon Hobbs	7	2011–12	Ky. Wesleyan
	Caleb Halcomb	7	2003–04	UW-Parkside
5	3 times by Caleb Halcomb	6	2003–04	
	George Suggs	6	2013–14	IU Southeast
