= 2013 Queensland Basketball League season =

- League: Queensland Basketball League
- Sport: Basketball
- Duration: 10 May – 31 August
- Games: 16
- Teams: 13

Regular season
- Minor premiers: Rockhampton Rockets
- Season MVP: Winston Robinson (Suncoast Clippers)
- Top scorer: Winston Robinson (Suncoast Clippers)

Finals
- Champions: Rockhampton Rockets
- Runners-up: Brisbane Capitals
- Grand Final MVP: Mitch Philp

QBL seasons
- ← 2012 2014 →

The 2013 Men's Queensland Basketball League season was the 28th running of the competition. The Rockhampton Rockets won the championship in 2013 to claim their fourth league title.

The teams for this season were: Brisbane Capitals, Bundaberg Bulls, Cairns Marlins, Gladstone Port City Power, Gold Coast Rollers, Ipswich Force, Mackay Meteors, Northside Wizards, Rockhampton Rockets, South West Metro Pirates, Suncoast Clippers, Toowoomba Mountaineers and Townsville Heat.

== Team information ==
Team	Home stadium
Brisbane Capitals	NAB Stadium
Bundaberg Bulls	WIN Stadium
Cairns Marlins	Bendigo Bank Stadium
Gladstone Port City Power	Kev Broome Stadium
Gold Coast Rollers	The Southport School
Ipswich Force	Cotton On Foundation Stadium
Mackay Meteors	Candlestick Park
Northside Wizards	South Pine Sports Complex
Rockhampton Rockets	Hegvold Stadium
South West Metro Pirates	Hibiscus Sports Complex
Suncoast Clippers	Maroochydore Basketball Stadium
Toowoomba Mountaineers	USQ, Clive Berghofer Recreation Centre
Townsville Heat	Townsville Basketball Stadium

== Standings ==
#	Regular Season Standings			
#	Team	W	L	PCT
1	Rockhampton Rockets	14	2	88
2	Cairns Marlins	12	4	75
3	Townsville Heat	11	5	69
4	Brisbane Capitals	11	5	69
5	Northside Wizards	11	5	69
6	Mackay Meteors	10	6	63
7	Gladstone Port City Power	10	6	63
8	Suncoast Clippers	6	10	38
9	Gold Coast Rollers	6	10	38
10	Toowoomba Mountaineers	5	11	31
11	Bundaberg Bulls	4	12	25
12	Ipswich Force	3	15	19
13	South West Metro Pirates	1	15	6

=== Finals ===
#	Pool A
#	Team
1	Rockhampton Rockets*
2	Cairns Marlins**
3	Townsville Heat**
6	Mackay Meteors
7	Gladstone Port City Power

#	Pool B
#	Team
4	Brisbane Capitals**
5	Northside Wizards**
8	Suncoast Clippers
11	Bundaberg Bulls

#	Pool C
#	Team
9	Gold Coast Rollers**
10	Toowoomba Mountaineers**
12	Ipswich Force
13	South West Metro Pirates

*The team that finishes 1st overall goes straight through to the semi-finals.

**The top two teams from each pool face-off in the quarter-finals.

- QF 1: 1st in Pool A vs. 2nd in Pool A
- QF 2: 1st in Pool B vs. 2nd in Pool C
- QF 3: 1st in Pool C vs. 2nd in Pool B

Quarter-finals
9	Gold Coast Rollers	63
5	Northside Wizards	79
2	Cairns Marlins	86
3	Townsville Heat	99
4	Brisbane Capitals	102
10	Toowoomba M'taineers	79

Semi-finals
1	Rockhampton Rockets	91
5	Northside Wizards	80
3	Townsville Heat	95
4	Brisbane Capitals	101

Grand Final
Rockhampton Rockets	102
Brisbane Capitals	95

== Awards ==
=== Player of the Week ===
Round	Player	Team	Ref
1	Winston Robinson	Suncoast Clippers	
2	Chris Goulding	Gladstone Port City Power	
3	Ryan Jeffries	Brisbane Capitals	
4	Braydon Hobbs	Gladstone Port City Power	
5	Zarryon Fereti	Bundaberg Bulls	
6	Anthony Kopcikas	Brisbane Capitals	
7	N/A (Note: Due to the Basketball Queensland Annual Conference and Awards events being held that weekend, Round 7 was a short round.)		
8	Alex Desroches	Ipswich Force	
9	James Legan	Toowoomba Mountaineers	
10	Justin Baker	Gladstone Port City Power	
11	Chris Cedar	Townsville Heat	
12	Stephen Weigh	Rockhampton Rockets	
13	Winston Robinson	Suncoast Clippers	
14	Brad Williamson	Rockhampton Rockets	
15	Dusty Rychart	Brisbane Capitals	

=== Coach of the Month ===
Month	Coach	Team	Ref
May/June	Dale Iwanicki	Gladstone Port City Power	
June/July	Leonard King	Northside Wizards	
July/August	Neal Tweedy	Rockhampton Rockets	

=== Statistics leaders ===
Category	Player	Team	Stat
Points per game	Winston Robinson	Suncoast Clippers	30.9
Rebounds per game	Willie Shackleford	Bundaberg Bulls	18.2
Assists per game	Braydon Hobbs	Gladstone Port City Power	6
Steals per game	Marques Whippy	Northside Wizards	3.08
Blocks per game	Stephen Kluck	Toowoomba Mountaineers	2.5
Field goal percentage	Matthew Andronicos	Cairns Marlins	63.51%
3-pt field goal percentage	Braydon Hobbs	Gladstone Port City Power	45.69%
Free throw percentage	Willie Farley	Toowoomba Mountaineers	91.89%

=== Regular season ===
- Most Valuable Player: Winston Robinson (Suncoast Clippers)
- Coach of the Year: Jamie Pearlman (Cairns Marlins)
- U23 Youth Player of the Year: Mitch McCarron (Northside Wizards)
- All-League Team:
  - G: Braydon Hobbs (Gladstone Port City Power)
  - G: Shaun Gleeson (Gladstone Port City Power)
  - F: Winston Robinson (Suncoast Clippers)
  - F: Stephen Weigh (Rockhampton Rockets)
  - C: Dusty Rychart (Brisbane Capitals)

=== Finals ===
- Grand Final MVP: Mitch Philp (Rockhampton Rockets)
