= Jeremy Kendle =

American basketball player

Personal information
- Born: March 15, 1988 (age 38) Jeffersonville, Indiana, U.S.
- Listed height: 186 cm (6 ft 1 in)
- Listed weight: 93 kg (205 lb)

Career information
- High school: Jeffersonville (Jeffersonville, Indiana)
- College: Olney Central (2006–2007); Bellarmine (2009–2012)
- NBA draft: 2013: undrafted
- Playing career: 2013–present
- Position: Point guard / shooting guard
- Coaching career: 2020–present

Career history

Playing
- 2013: Wydad Casablanca
- 2013: SAM Massagno
- 2013–2014: Essaouira
- 2015: Toowoomba Mountaineers
- 2016: Bendigo Braves
- 2017: Brisbane Bullets
- 2017: Canterbury Rams
- 2017: South West Metro Pirates
- 2017: Sydney Kings
- 2018: Bendigo Braves
- 2018–2019: Brisbane Bullets
- 2019: Southland Sharks
- 2021: Adelaide 36ers
- 2021: New Zealand Breakers
- 2021: Auckland Huskies
- 2021–2022: Logan Thunder
- 2023: Southland Sharks
- 2024: Al-Ittihad SC Aleppo
- 2024: Southern Districts Spartans

Coaching
- 2020: South West Metro Pirates

Career highlights
- SEABL champion (2016); NZNBL All-Star Five (2023); NZNBL scoring champion (2023); NZNBL assist champion (2023); NBL1 North MVP (2021); 2× NBL1 North All-Star Five (2021, 2022); SEABL Grand Final MVP (2016); SEABL MVP (2016); All-SEABL Team (2016); All-SEABL Second Team (2018); SEABL scoring champion (2016); QBL MVP (2015); QBL All-League Team (2015); QBL scoring champion (2015); Morocco League champion (2013); NCAA Division II champion (2011); 2× Second-team Division II All-American – NABC (2011, 2012); GLVC Player of the Year (2011); 2× First-team All-GLVC (2011, 2012); Second-team All-GLVC (2010)

Jeremy Paul Kendle (born March 15, 1988) is an American professional basketball player who last played for the Southern Districts Spartans of the NBL1 North. He played three seasons of college basketball for Bellarmine University, becoming the only player in school history to be named to the NABC All-America Team two years in a row. He was also a key member of the Bellarmine Knights' 2011 championship-winning team, helping the school claim their first NCAA Division II National Championship.

Kendle moved to Australia in 2015 and earned the QBL Most Valuable Player award as a member of the Toowoomba Mountaineers. The following year, he joined the Bendigo Braves and helped them win the SEABL championship. He was also named league MVP and grand final MVP. He went on to have multiple stints in the Australian National Basketball League (NBL) and in 2020 he coached the South West Metro Pirates in the Queensland State League (QSL). In 2021, he was named NBL1 North MVP.

== Early life ==
Kendle was born and raised in Jeffersonville, Indiana, and grew up playing basketball. As a sophomore at Jeffersonville High School, Kendle was nearly cut from the basketball team due to his small stature; he was 5 feet 7 inches (1.70 m) tall and weighed 140 pounds (64 kg). He was told he wasn't good enough to make the varsity basketball team. The head coach on the senior varsity team wanted to cut him, but the junior varsity coach knew his father and they had a mutual respect. He kept Kendle on the team, but he rode the bench for the whole season. The next year, he hit a six-inch growth spurt and worked really hard physically. He subsequently started on the varsity team as a junior.

As a senior in 2005–06 playing for coach Jimmy Just, Kendle averaged 15.1 points and 4.4 rebounds per game. He helped lead the Red Devils to a 23–2 record and the Hoosier Hills Conference Championship, and subsequently earned first team All-District, All-Region and All-Area selection.

During his high school years, Kendle's mother battled ovarian cancer. Kendle has said of those tough times, "It all happened for a reason. It made my character stronger. Having that perseverance in you is a key to life in my opinion."

== College career ==
=== Injury troubles and second chance ===
As a freshman in 2006–07, Kendle attended Olney Central Community College but managed just two games for the Blue Knights after sustaining a severe foot injury that required surgery. He returned home to Jeffersonville for the 2007–08 season and fully recovered. After his left foot healed, he re-joined the Blue Knights for the 2008–09 season, but on the first day of practice, he broke his right foot. After three months out, he came back and broke his right foot again in two different places. Undeterred, Kendle subsequently changed his diet and went through a vigorous therapy program.

His comeback in 2009 saw him earn a try-out with Bellarmine University, despite his commitment to being a walk-on at the University of Southern Indiana, a rival school of Bellarmine. He played well in the trial at Bellarmine, and a few days later, he was given a full scholarship. Bellarmine was only a 20-minute drive from his family home which allowed him to spend time with his ill mother and gave his family the chance to watch him play regularly.

=== Bellarmine University ===
==== 2009–10 season ====
Kendle began playing for the Bellarmine Knights during the 2009–10 season. Stringing together his first full college season, Kendle led the Knights in scoring with 17.7 points per game and subsequently earned second-team All-GLVC honors. During the 2010 GLVC Tournament, he helped his team win the event while earning Tournament MVP and All-Tournament Team honors.

==== 2010–11 season ====
In his second season playing for the Knights, Kendle garnered numerous awards. The National Association of Basketball Coaches (NABC) named Kendle to their 2011 State Farm Division II All-America Team, and Daktronics (voted on by college sports information directors) named Kendle to their Third Team All-American squad. He also earned NABC Division II All-Midwest Region first team, All-GLVC first team and GLVC Player of the Year honors after averaging 17.3 points and 3.3 rebounds during the regular season. Kendle helped lead Bellarmine to a 30–2 record and a trip to the NCAA Division II Elite 8 for the first time in school history. He went on to lead them even further as the Knights won their first NCAA Division II National Championship in 2010–11. Kendle subsequently earned NCAA Division II All-Tournament Team honors.

==== 2011–12 season ====
In August 2011, the NCAA granted Kendle two more seasons of college eligibility after deeming his first two seasons at Olney Central did not count due to his injuries. As a junior in 2011–12, Kendle once again led the Knights back to the NCAA Division II Final Four and earned All-GLVC first team and NABC Division II All-America Team honors for a second straight year. In 33 games for the Knights in 2011–12, he averaged 19.2 points, 3.9 rebounds, 3.2 assists and 1.1 steals per game.

On September 28, 2012, it was announced that Kendle had signed with an agent to pursue professional basketball opportunities and would not return to Bellarmine for the 2012–13 season. Kendle left Bellarmine as the only player in school history to be named to the NABC All-America Team two years in a row, and was on track to become the all-time leading scorer. Kendle ended his career fourth on Bellarmine's all-time scoring list with 1,792 points.

==== College statistics ====
Year	Team	GP	GS	MPG	FG%	3P%	FT%	RPG	APG	SPG	BPG	PPG
2009–10	Bellarmine	32	29	33.2	.506	.377	.740	5.7	4.1	.5	.2	17.7
2010–11	Bellarmine	35	35	32.7	.427	.331	.839	4.3	3.5	.9	.2	16.9
2011–12	Bellarmine	33	33	33.4	.559	.379	.809	3.9	3.2	1.1	.2	19.2
Career		100	97	33.0	.511	.362	.801	4.6	3.6	.8	.2	17.9

== Professional career ==
=== Morocco and Switzerland (2013–2014) ===
On January 1, 2013, Kendle signed in Morocco with Wydad Athletic Club. He went on to help Wydad win the 2012–13 Morocco League championship.

For the 2013–14 season, Kendle moved to Switzerland to play for SAM Basket Massagno. He only managed two games before returning home due to injury. He later returned to Morocco to play for Amal Essaouira, where he helped the team reach the final of both the Throne Cup and the Morocco League, losing both times to AS Salé.

=== Toowoomba Mountaineers (2015) ===
On March 27, 2015, Kendle signed with the Toowoomba Mountaineers for the 2015 Queensland Basketball League season. He debuted in the second game of the season on May 9 and had 31 points, 10 rebounds and 11 assists in a 110–83 win over the Ipswich Force. On June 7, he scored 40 points in a 101–83 win over the Cairns Marlins. In round 10, he had 31 points against the Gold Coast Rollers and 44 points against the Logan Thunder. He was subsequently named Player of the Week. On July 18, he recorded his second triple-double with 29 points, 14 rebounds, 19 assists and seven steals in a 112–79 win over the Bundaberg Bulls. He helped the Mountaineers finish the regular season in fifth place with an 11–6 record. In the quarter-finals, he scored a season-high 46 points in a 108–96 overtime win over the Northside Wizards. In the semi-finals, he had 24 points and 12 rebounds in a 104–92 loss to the Mackay Meteors. He subsequently earned league MVP honors and was named to the All-League Team. In 18 games, he averaged 30.2 points, 7.3 rebounds, 6.5 assists and 1.9 steals per game. As a result of his season in Toowoomba, Kendle was touted as a possible injury replacement for the Cairns Taipans of the National Basketball League in December 2015.

=== Bendigo Braves (2016) ===
On December 22, 2015, Kendle signed with the Bendigo Braves for the 2016 SEABL season. He made his debut for the Braves in the team's season opener on April 1, 2016, scoring a team-high 24 points in a 93–68 win over the Ballarat Miners. On May 22, he scored 34 points in a 91–87 loss to the Dandenong Rangers. His form over the first half of the season saw him be considered as an MVP candidate. Between June 18 and July 24, Kendle scored 30 points or more in six out of seven games, including a season-high 43 points on July 16 against the NW Tasmania Thunder. During that stretch, he earned Player of the Week honors three times. Entering round 17 on a 10-game winning streak, Kendle scored 38 points on July 30 against the Sandringham Sabres to extend the streak to 11 games with a 96–74 win. In the Braves' regular-season finale on August 13, Kendle scored a game-high 34 points in a 108–105 overtime win over the Albury Wodonga Bandits, extending their winning streak to 13 games. The Braves finished first on the standings with a 21–3 record, while Kendle earned the league's scoring title with an average of 27.7 points per game. In the semi-finals, he scored a game-high 33 points in an 83–60 win over the Brisbane Spartans. In the East Conference final, he scored 17 points in a 76–64 win over the Nunawading Spectres. In the SEABL final, Kendle scored a game-high 34 points in a 79–61 win over the Mount Gambier Pioneers. He was subsequently named MVP of the match. For the season, Kendle was named the SEABL's Most Valuable Player and earned All-SEABL Team honors. He appeared in all 27 games for the Braves in 2016, averaging 27.7 points, 6.6 rebounds, 3.7 assists and 1.6 steals per game.

=== Brisbane Bullets (2017) ===
In late December 2016, Kendle joined the NBL's Brisbane Bullets at practice as an option to provide additional guard coverage within the roster. He was set to join the playing squad prior to the Bullets' New Year's Eve clash with the Cairns Taipans before being ruled out with a low grade calf strain. Despite not having fully recovered from the injury, Kendle officially signed with the Bullets for the rest of the 2016–17 season on January 11, 2017. He made his debut for the Bullets four days later, recording five points, one rebound and one steal in just under 12 minutes off the bench in an 84–82 loss to the New Zealand Breakers. In his second game for the Bullets on January 19, Kendle recorded five points, five rebounds and three assists in 19 minutes off the bench in a 101–68 loss to the Adelaide 36ers. Two days later, following the release of Jermaine Beal, Kendle made his first start in the NBL and subsequently scored 12 points on 5-of-9 shooting to go with six rebounds, four assists and one steal in just under 29 minutes in an 88–71 win over Melbourne United. He continued on as a starter in the following game on January 27 and scored a season-high 16 points in an 80–77 loss to the Sydney Kings. Two days later, he scored a team-high 24 points on 10-of-14 shooting in a 97–83 loss to the Cairns Taipans. In the Bullets' season finale on February 11, Kendle scored 11 points in a 106–79 loss to the Illawarra Hawks. In seven games for Brisbane, Kendle averaged 11.0 points, 2.9 rebounds and 2.4 assists per game.

=== Canterbury Rams (2017) ===
On January 27, 2017, Kendle signed with the Canterbury Rams for the 2017 New Zealand NBL season. He made his debut for the Rams in their season opener on March 18, 2017, recording a game-high 39 points, 10 rebounds and five assists in a 114–107 loss to the Super City Rangers. The following day, he scored 31 points in a 99–87 overtime win over the Hawke's Bay Hawks. Canterbury won the overtime period 16–4 with Kendle scoring 11 points. Kendle was named Player of the Week for Round 2 after tallying 24 points (10/15 FG, 4/7 3pt), nine assists, five rebounds and two steals in a 114–80 win over the Nelson Giants on March 25. On April 14, he had 13 assists in a 95–82 win over the Taranaki Mountainairs. In late May, coach Mark Dickel changed the makeup of his starting five by relegating Kendle to a bench role. Dickel's decision was defensive-minded as he looked to morph the team into a more balanced outfit ahead of the playoffs. The mid-season addition of McKenzie Moore also saw Kendle being able to take a step back from point guard duties. The Rams finished the regular season in fourth place with a 10–8 record, and lost to the first-seeded Wellington Saints 94–73 in their semi-final match-up. Kendle had a team-high 25 points and eight rebounds in the loss. He appeared in all 19 games for the Rams in 2017, averaging 20.5 points, 5.3 rebounds, 5.6 assists and 1.2 steals per game.

=== South West Metro Pirates (2017) ===
Following the conclusion of the New Zealand NBL season, Kendle returned to Australia and joined the South West Metro Pirates for the rest of the 2017 Queensland Basketball League season. He made his debut for the Pirates on July 1, scoring 22 points in a 90–87 loss to the Rockhampton Rockets. In his second game for the Pirates on July 15, Kendle scored 31 points in a 105–97 win over the Ipswich Force. To conclude the month, he had two 33-point games. The Pirates finished the regular season in sixth place with an 11–6 record, and faced the third-seeded Townsville Heat in the quarter-finals. Despite Kendle's game-high 31 points, 10 rebounds, four assists and seven steals, the Pirates were defeated 92–89. In seven games for the Pirates, he averaged 28.86 points per game.

=== Sydney Kings (2017) ===
On October 18, 2017, Kendle signed with the Sydney Kings as an injury replacement for Kevin Lisch, returning to the Australian NBL for a second stint. He made his debut for the Kings the following night, recording five points, two rebounds and two assists in a 90–73 loss to the New Zealand Breakers. He appeared in six games for the Kings up until November 9 before the team brought in import Jerome Randle. He averaged 6.8 points, 2.5 rebounds and 2.2 assists per game.

=== Return to Bendigo (2018) ===
On December 7, 2017, Kendle signed with the Bendigo Braves for the 2018 SEABL season, returning to the team for a second stint. In the Braves' season opener on April 6, 2018, Kendle scored 36 points in a 78–77 win over the Diamond Valley Eagles. He was subsequently named Player of the Week for Round 1. On May 4, he scored 36 points in a 91–87 loss to the BA Centre of Excellence. On July 7, he recorded 32 points and a season-high 11 rebounds in a 79–73 win over the North-West Tasmania Thunder. The Braves finished the regular season in seventh place with an 11–9 record. In their elimination final, Kendle scored 21 points in a 97–75 win over the Centre of Excellence. They went on to lose their semi-final against the Kilsyth Cobras 111–88, with Kendle scoring 16 points. He appeared in all 22 games for the Braves in 2018, averaging 23.1 points, 5.5 rebounds and 5.3 assists per game. He was named to the All-SEABL Second Team.

=== Return to the Bullets (2018–2019) ===
On December 4, 2018, Kendle was announced by the Brisbane Bullets as a short-term roster fill-in, following the release of Stephen Holt. Kendle had been training with the Bullets all season. In his first game back for the Bullets on December 8, Kendle played a crucial fourth-quarter role and finished with 15 points in a 97–94 win over Melbourne United. After scoring five points in a 90–74 win over United on December 10, Kendle's contract with the Bullets was extended for the rest of the season on December 13. On January 3, he scored 13 points in a 109–80 loss to the Cairns Taipans. On February 3, he scored 14 points in a 107–91 loss to the Sydney Kings. On February 9, he scored a team-high 17 points in a 79–68 loss to the Taipans. In 18 games, he averaged 6.0 points, 1.2 rebounds and 1.1 assists per game.

=== Southland Sharks (2019) ===
On May 3, 2019, Kendle signed with the Southland Sharks of the New Zealand NBL for a two-game stint. He scored 15 points in his first game and 21 in his second.

=== Adelaide 36ers and New Zealand Breakers (2021) ===
In November 2020, Kendle played for the Brisbane Bullets in their two NBL preseason games in Adelaide against the 36ers. On February 10, 2021, he signed with the 36ers to fill a vacant import position following the release of Donald Sloan. In his debut for the 36ers five days later, he recorded five points and three assists in 10 minutes off the bench in a 93–74 loss to the Bullets. On February 25, he scored 12 points in an 82–73 loss to Melbourne United. He was released from his short-term contract on March 12.

On March 13, 2021, Kendle signed with the New Zealand Breakers as an injury replacement for Lamar Patterson. In his debut for the Breakers seven days later, he scored seven points in 15 minutes off the bench in an 88–67 loss to the Bullets. On March 25, he scored 13 points in an 82–79 loss to Melbourne United. He played three games for the Breakers as they juggled roster alterations.

=== Auckland Huskies (2021) ===
On April 22, 2021, Kendle signed a three-game deal with the Auckland Huskies for the start of the 2021 New Zealand NBL season. In his debut for the Huskies three days later, he scored a game-high 32 points in a 99–96 win over the Franklin Bulls. In his third and final game on May 9, he scored 23 points and hit the game-winning 3-pointer in a 90–87 overtime win over the Nelson Giants.

=== Logan Thunder (2021–2022) ===
Kendle joined the Logan Thunder of the NBL1 North for the 2021 NBL1 season. In his debut for the Thunder in their season opener on May 15, he recorded 29 points, 12 rebounds and 10 assists in a 107–89 win over the RedCity Roar. On May 30, he had 15 points and 16 assists in a 93–74 win over the Northside Wizards. On June 26, he scored 31 points in a 107–99 win over the Gold Coast Rollers. On July 24, he recorded 21 points and 15 assists in a 132–99 win over the Southern Districts Spartans. He helped the Thunder finish on top of the ladder in the regular season with a 12–1 record, averaging 21.5 points, 9.2 assists and 6.1 rebounds. He was subsequently named NBL1 North MVP and NBL1 North All-Star Five. They defeated the Spartans in the quarter-final with Kendle scoring 29 points and then lost to the Cairns Marlins in the semi-final with Kendle scoring 18 points. In 15 games, he averaged 21.73 points, 6.2 rebounds, 8.66 assists and 1.46 steals per game.

On January 21, 2022, Kendle re-signed with the Thunder for the 2022 NBL1 North season. He scored 30 points or more eight times, including a season-high 39 points on August 6 against the South West Metro Pirates. He was named to the NBL1 North All-Star Five for the second straight year. In 18 games, he averaged 28.89 points, 4.89 rebounds, 6.11 assists and 1.28 steals per game.

=== Return to Southland Sharks (2023) ===
On February 27, 2023, Kendle signed with the Southland Sharks for the 2023 New Zealand NBL season, returning to the team for a second stint. On April 30, he scored 25 of his 30 points in the fourth quarter to go with 11 assists in a 97–89 win over the Hawke's Bay Hawks. On May 20, he had 20 points and 20 assists in a 105–89 win over the Manawatu Jets. On June 10, he scored a game-high 45 points in a 103–93 loss to the Taranaki Airs. In 18 games, he averaged 24.6 points, 3.8 rebounds and 8.9 assists per game. He was named NZNBL All-Star Five as well as scoring champion and assist champion.

=== Al-Ittihad SC Aleppo (2024) ===
In January 2024, Kendle signed with Al-Ittihad SC Aleppo of the Syrian Basketball League. He appeared in four games during the 2023–24 FIBA West Asia Super League, averaging 19.5 points, 2.5 rebounds and 5.8 assists per game.

=== Southern Districts Spartans (2024) ===
In June 2024, Kendle joined the Southern Districts Spartans of the NBL1 North. He appeared in two games for the Spartans during the 2024 season.

== 3x3 career ==
In 2018, Kendle made his 3-on-3 basketball debut in the NBL 3×3 Pro Hustle Tour, where his team won both tournaments. In 2019, he made his return to the Pro Hustle Tour in the hopes of qualifying to represent the United States in 3-on-3 at the 2020 Tokyo Olympics. He helped his team win two of the three stops. In May 2019, Kendle tore his ACL playing in a 3x3 tournament in Penang, Malaysia.

== Coaching career ==
In November 2019, Kendle was appointed player/coach of the South West Metro Pirates of the NBL1 North for the 2020 season. However, due to the COVID-19 pandemic, the 2020 NBL1 season was cancelled. He later coached the Pirates' Men's Division 1 team in the 2020 Queensland State League (QSL).

== Personal life ==
Kendle's wife Nadia is from Nelson, New Zealand. They met and married in Brisbane, Australia. The couple have twins that were born in 2019.
