= Northside Wizards =

Basketball club

- Leagues: NBL1 North
- History: Brisbane Wizards; 1993–2002; Northside Wizards; 2003–2015; 2020–
- Arena: Northside Indoor Sports Centre
- Location: Brisbane, Queensland
- Team colors: Navy, blue & white
- CEO: Mark Wrobel
- President: Cameron Meizer
- Vice-president: Greg Smith
- Championships: 0 (M); 1 (2023) (W)
- Website: northsidewizards.com
Home	Away	Third

Northside Wizards is a NBL1 North club based in Brisbane, Queensland. The club fields a team in both the Men's and Women's NBL1 North. The club is a division of Northside Basketball Inc., the major administrative basketball organisation in northern Brisbane. The Wizards play their home games at Northside Indoor Sports Centre.

== Club history ==
Northside Basketball's history stems back to 1935 when the Brisbane Women's Basketball Club was formed. In 1951 the name was changed to Brisbane Men's and Women's Basketball and in 1990 it became known as the Brisbane Community Basketball Association. In 1993, the club began trading as the Brisbane Wizards.

Competing in the Queensland Basketball League (QBL), the club became known as Northside Wizards in 2003. In 2010, the women's team reached the QBL grand final, where they lost to the Gladstone Port City Power. The Wizards left the QBL after the 2015 season.

The Wizards played in the Queensland State League (QSL) in 2020 and then joined the NBL1 North in 2021.

In 2023, the women's team reached the NBL1 North grand final series, where they defeated the Rockhampton Cyclones 2–0, with 87–52 in game one and 70–59 in game two. In 2024, the women's team returned to the NBL1 North grand final series, this time losing 2–1 to the Cyclones. The Wizards won game one 80–71 but then lost game two 81–76 and lost game three 80–59.
