= Willie Farley =

American basketball player (born 1975)

Personal information
- Born: August 22, 1975 (age 51) Chicago, Illinois, U.S.
- Listed height: 6 ft 4 in (1.93 m)
- Listed weight: 190 lb (86 kg)

Career information
- High school: Orr Academy (Chicago, Illinois); Farragut Academy (Chicago, Illinois)
- College: Chaffey (1995–1997); Fresno State (1997–1999)
- NBA draft: 1999: undrafted
- Playing career: 1999–present
- Position: Shooting guard / small forward

Career history
- 1999–2000: Rochester Skeeters
- 2000: Washington Ambassadors
- 2000: Golbey-Epinal
- 2001–2002: Adelaide 36ers
- 2002: Santa Lucia Realty
- 2002–2003: West Sydney Razorbacks
- 2003: Sioux Falls Skyforce
- 2003–2004: Anjou Basket Club Angers
- 2004–2007: Adelaide 36ers
- 2007: Fabriano Basket
- 2007: Wonju Dongbu Promy
- 2007–2008: Mutlu Akü Selçuk Üniversitesi
- 2008–2009: Libertad de Sunchales
- 2013–2014: Toowoomba Mountaineers

Career highlights
- NBL champion (2002); 2× NBL All-Star (2005, 2006); All-NBL Second Team (2002); All-NBL Third Team (2005); IBA All-Star (2000)

Willie Deshon Farley (born August 22, 1975) is an American former professional basketball player. He has played around the world, including stops in France, the Philippines and Australia.

== Early life ==
As a youngster, Farley played competitive table tennis before focusing on basketball.

Farley played high school basketball for Orr Academy before transferring to Farragut Academy.

== College career ==
Farley played college basketball for Chaffey College from 1995 to 1997. In 1997, Farley transferred to Fresno State where he had to sit out a semester before becoming eligible to play. In December 1997, he played just six games before walking out on the team, with the impending return of Chris Herren being cited as reason for his departure. In 1998, he returned to the team for the 1998–99 season.

== Professional career ==
=== 1999–2001 ===
Farley went undrafted in the 1999 NBA draft. In December 1999, he signed with the Rochester Skeeters for the rest of the 1999–2000 International Basketball Association season, playing 27 games. He later joined the Washington D.C. Ambassadors for the 2000 United States Basketball League season.

Later that year, he signed with Golbey-Epinal of France for the 2000–01 season. In December 2000, he left France.

=== 2001–2007 ===
In 2001, Farley signed with the Adelaide 36ers for the 2001–02 season. He finished second in the league in scoring averaging 24.9 points per game and led the 36ers to an unlikely championship.

In July 2002, he signed with Santa Lucia Realty of the Philippines for a short stint. Later that year, he signed with the West Sydney Razorbacks for the 2002–03 season.

In November 2003, he joined the Sioux Falls Skyforce for the 2003–04 CBA season. He later left after just two games. In December 2003, he joined Anjou Basket Club Angers of France for the rest of the season.

In 2004, he re-joined the Adelaide 36ers for the 2004–05 season. In his first season back with the 36ers, he averaged 23.5 point per game and won the club's Most Valuable Player award and finished second to Brian Wethers in the league MVP award.

Despite Farley's return, the 36ers were knocked out in the first round of the playoffs in 2005 and 2006 before failing to make the playoffs in 2007. He was runner-up in the 2006 NBL Dunk Competition behind New Zealand Breakers forward Carlos Powell. During his playing days in the NBL, Farley was seen as one of the most explosive scorers in the league, consistently putting up respected numbers while exciting fans with high flying dunks and a plethora of long range threes.

In March 2007, he joined Indesit Fabriano of Italy for the rest of the season.

=== 2007–2009 ===
In July 2007, Farley was selected by Wonju Dongbu Promy in the Korean Basketball League Foreign Player Draft. In November 2007, he joined Mutlu Aku Selcuk Universitesi Konya of Turkey for the 2007–08 season.

In December 2008, he signed a two-month contract with Libertad de Sunchales of Argentina. Following the expiry of his contract, he was released.

=== 2013–2014 ===
In May 2013, Farley signed with the Toowoomba Mountaineers for the rest of the 2013 QBL season. In December 2013, he signed with the Toowoomba Mountaineers as their player/coach for the 2014 season.
