= 2015 Queensland Basketball League season =

- League: Queensland Basketball League
- Sport: Basketball
- Duration: 1 May – 30 August
- Games: 17
- Teams: 14

Regular season
- Minor premiers: Mackay Meteors
- Season MVP: Jeremy Kendle (Toowoomba Mountaineers)
- Top scorer: Jeremy Kendle (Toowoomba Mountaineers)

Finals
- Champions: Mackay Meteors
- Runners-up: Brisbane Capitals
- Grand Final MVP: Braydon Hobbs

QBL seasons
- ← 2014 2016 →

The 2015 Men's Queensland Basketball League season was the 30th running of the competition. The Mackay Meteors won the championship in 2015 to claim their third league title.

The teams for this season were: Brisbane Capitals, Bundaberg Bulls, Cairns Marlins, Gladstone Port City Power, Gold Coast Rollers, Ipswich Force, Logan Thunder, Mackay Meteors, Northside Wizards, Rockhampton Rockets, South West Metro Pirates, Suncoast Clippers, Toowoomba Mountaineers and Townsville Heat.

== Team information ==
Team	Home stadium	Head coach	Import	Import
Brisbane Capitals	NAB Stadium	Geoff Tarrant	(United States) Aaron Anderson	
Bundaberg Bulls	WIN Stadium	Larry Daniels	(United States) Willie Shackleford	(United States) Ricky James
Cairns Marlins	Bendigo Bank Stadium	Jamie Pearlman		
Gladstone Port City Power	Kev Broome Stadium	Derek Rucker	(United States) Ray Willis	(United States) Justin Baker
Gold Coast Rollers	The Southport School	Doug Garvie	(United States) Devon Sullivan	
Ipswich Force	Cotton On Foundation Stadium	Mick Conlon	(United States) James Legan	(United States) Kyle Harvey
Logan Thunder	Cornubia Park Sports Centre	Ben Johnson		
Mackay Meteors	Candlestick Park	Joel Khalu	(United States) Braydon Hobbs	
Northside Wizards	South Pine Sports Complex	Andrew Latimer	(United States) Evan Coulter	(United States) Darren Moore
Rockhampton Rockets	Hegvold Stadium	Neal Tweedy	(United States) Chehales Tapscott	(United States) Dominic Cheek
South West Metro Pirates	Hibiscus Sports Complex	Luke Petersen	(United States) Ishmael Hollis	
Suncoast Clippers	Maroochydore Basketball Stadium	Bradley Melton	(United States) Michael Stone	(United States) Eren Moses
Toowoomba Mountaineers	USQ, Clive Berghofer Recreation Centre	Anthony Corcoran	(United States) Erron Maxey	(United States) Jeremy Kendle
Townsville Heat	Townsville Basketball Stadium	Rod Anderson		

== Standings ==
#	Regular Season Standings			
#	Team	W	L	PCT
1	Mackay Meteors	15	2	88
2	Brisbane Capitals	14	3	82
3	Rockhampton Rockets	12	5	71
4	Gladstone Port City Power	12	5	71
5	Toowoomba Mountaineers	11	6	65
6	Northside Wizards	11	6	65
7	Cairns Marlins	10	7	59
8	Townsville Heat*	8	8	50
9	Ipswich Force	7	10	41
10	Suncoast Clippers*	5	11	32
11	South West Metro Pirates	5	12	29
12	Logan Thunder	5	12	29
13	Bundaberg Bulls	2	15	12
14	Gold Coast Rollers	1	16	6

*Every team competed in 17 regular season games over 15 rounds except for the Townsville Heat and Suncoast Clippers. The Round 1 match-up between the two sides was abandoned after the referees couldn't make it to the game due to poor weather in the Maroochydore area.

=== Finals ===
#	Pool A
#	Team
1	Mackay Meteors*
3	Rockhampton Rockets**
4	Gladstone Port City Power**
7	Cairns Marlins
8	Townsville Heat

#	Pool B
#	Team
2	Brisbane Capitals**
6	Northside Wizards**
10	Suncoast Clippers
12	Logan Thunder
13	Bundaberg Bulls

#	Pool C
#	Team
5	Toowoomba Mountaineers**
9	Ipswich Force**
11	South West Metro Pirates
14	Gold Coast Rollers

*The team that finishes 1st overall goes straight through to the semi-finals.

**The top two teams from each pool face-off in the quarter-finals.

- QF 1: 1st in Pool A vs. 2nd in Pool A
- QF 2: 1st in Pool B vs. 2nd in Pool C
- QF 3: 1st in Pool C vs. 2nd in Pool B

Quarter-finals
5	Toowoomba M'taineers	108	X	X
6	Northside Wizards	96	X	X
2	Brisbane Capitals	90	X	X
9	Ipswich Force	85	X	X
3	Rockhampton Rockets	86	X	X
4	Gladstone PC Power	94	X	X

Semi-finals
1	Mackay Meteors	104	X	X
5	Toowoomba M'taineers	92	X	X
2	Brisbane Capitals	78	X	X
4	Gladstone PC Power	77	X	X

Grand Final
Mackay Meteors	82	73	88
Brisbane Capitals	76	85	86

== Awards ==
=== Player of the Week ===
Round	Player	Team	Ref
1	James Legan	Ipswich Force	
2	Chehales Tapscott	Rockhampton Rockets	
3	Chehales Tapscott	Rockhampton Rockets	
4	Drew Phillips	Brisbane Capitals	
5	N/A (Note: Due to the Basketball Queensland Annual Conference and Awards events being held that weekend, Round 5 was a short round.)		
6	Ishmael Hollis	South West Metro Pirates	
7	Matthew Adekponya	Mackay Meteors	
8	Ray Willis	Gladstone Port City Power	
9	Nicholas Kay	Northside Wizards	
10	Jeremy Kendle	Toowoomba Mountaineers	
11	Chehales Tapscott	Rockhampton Rockets	
12	Ray Willis	Gladstone Port City Power	
13	Ricky James	Bundaberg Bulls	
14	Ryan Jeffries	Brisbane Capitals	
15	Kyle Harvey	Ipswich Force	

=== Coach of the Month ===
Month	Coach	Team	Ref
May	Joel Khalu	Mackay Meteors	
June	Joel Khalu	Mackay Meteors	
July	Geoff Tarrant	Brisbane Capitals	

=== Statistics leaders ===
Category	Player	Team	Stat
Points per game	Jeremy Kendle	Toowoomba Mountaineers	30.5
Rebounds per game	Willie Shackleford	Bundaberg Bulls	17.2
Assists per game	Mitch Philp	Rockhampton Rockets	7.1
Steals per game	Aaron Anderson	Brisbane Capitals	2
Blocks per game	Nelson Kahler	Suncoast Clippers	2.3
Field goal percentage	Matthew Andronicos	Cairns Marlins	60.6%
3-pt field goal percentage	Kyle Keirnan	Logan Thunder	45.4%
Free throw percentage	James Legan	Ipswich Force	88.8%

=== Regular season ===
- Most Valuable Player: Jeremy Kendle (Toowoomba Mountaineers)
- Coach of the Year: Joel Khalu (Mackay Meteors)
- U23 Youth Player of the Year: Mitch Norton (Townsville Heat)
- All-League Team:
  - G: Jeremy Kendle (Toowoomba Mountaineers)
  - G: Braydon Hobbs (Mackay Meteors)
  - F: Chehales Tapscott (Rockhampton Rockets)
  - F: Erron Maxey (Toowoomba Mountaineers)
  - C: Dusty Rychart (Brisbane Capitals)

=== Finals ===
- Grand Final MVP: Braydon Hobbs (Mackay Meteors)
