= Rhys Martin =

Australian basketball player

Personal information
- Born: 13 February 1986 (age 40) Brisbane, Queensland, Australia
- Listed height: 185 cm (6 ft 1 in)
- Listed weight: 84 kg (185 lb)

Career information
- High school: John Paul College (Brisbane, Queensland)
- College: Nova Southeastern (2005–2007)
- Playing career: 2007–present
- Position: Point guard

Career history
- 2007: Caloundra Suns
- 2007–2008: Brisbane Bullets
- 2008–2009: Rockhampton Rockets
- 2008–2018: Wollongong / Illawarra Hawks
- 2010–2011: Mackay Meteors
- 2015: Mackay Meteors
- 2018–2019: Gold Coast Rollers

Career highlights
- ABA champion (2008); 2× QBL champion (2008, 2011); 4× QBL All-League Team (2008–2011); SSC All-Freshman Team (2006)

Rhys Martin (born 13 February 1986) is an Australian professional basketball player who last played for the Gold Coast Rollers of the Queensland Basketball League (QBL). He is most well known for his 10 seasons in the National Basketball League (NBL) with the Illawarra Hawks.

== Early life ==
Born and raised in Brisbane, Queensland, Martin grew up playing for the Southern Districts Spartans.

== College career ==
Martin played two college basketball seasons for Nova Southeastern University in the NCAA Division II between 2005 and 2007. His coach at NSU, Gary Tuell, considered him one of the best point guards the school ever had come through the program.

== Professional career ==
After a stint in the Queensland Basketball League (QBL) with the Caloundra Suns upon returning from college, Martin joined the Brisbane Bullets as a development player for the 2007–08 NBL season.

In 2008, Martin joined the Wollongong Hawks for the first of 10 seasons with the club. He also played for the Rockhampton Rockets in the QBL in 2008 and 2009. In 2010 and 2011, he played in the QBL for the Mackay Meteors. During this time, he won two QBL championships.

With the Hawks, Martin missed large chunks of the 2010–11 and 2012–13 seasons due to injury. On 28 February 2014, Martin scored a career-high 32 points in a 91–89 win over the Adelaide 36ers. Following the 2014–15 NBL season, Martin joined the Mackay Meteors for a five-game stint.

With the Hawks' name change from Wollongong to Illawarra, Martin re-signed with the club on 25 June 2015 for the 2015–16 season. He missed the first 12 games of the season due to a knee injury. On 21 January 2016, he played his 200th NBL game in a loss to the Perth Wildcats.

On 18 April 2016, Martin re-signed with the Hawks on a two-year deal. On 21 June 2018, the Hawks parted ways with Martin.

In 2018 and 2019, Martin played in the QBL with the Gold Coast Rollers.

== Personal ==
Martin is married to wife Danielle.
