= Scott McGregor (basketball) =

Australian basketball player

Personal information
- Born: 5 February 1976 (age 50) Newcastle, New South Wales
- Listed height: 6 ft 7 1/2 in (2.02 m)
- Listed weight: 236 lb (107 kg)

Career information
- Playing career: 1996–2010
- Position: Forward

Career history
- 1996–1997: Newcastle Falcons
- 1998–2000: Sydney Kings
- 2000–2007: West Sydney Razorbacks
- 2004: Hawke's Bay Hawks
- 2005: Otago Nuggets
- 2007–2009: Gold Coast Blaze
- 2009–2010: Maitland Mustangs

Career highlights
- NBL Rookie of the Year (1996)

Scott McGregor (born 5 February 1976) is an Australian former professional basketball player.

Born in Newcastle, New South Wales, McGregor attended the Australian Institute of Sport from 1994 to 1995.

He began his NBL career with the Newcastle Falcons, where he won the NBL Rookie of the Year award. In 1997, McGregor played in the Australian Under 22's team that won a gold medal in the FIBA World Championships in Melbourne. McGregor was one of many future NBL stars, including Chris Anstey, Sam Mackinnon and Frank Drmic, to suit up in the team. After the 1997 NBL season, McGregor moved to the Sydney Kings where he would play until 2000, making the switch to Sydney's cross-town rivals. On 5 April 2007, McGregor left the struggling Razorbacks to become the first player signed by the Gold Coast Blaze.

Since leaving the NBL in 2009, he has played in the Waratah League and the Queensland Basketball League. He retired in 2010.

In 2026, McGregor served as an assistant coach for the Gold Coast Rollers men's team in the NBL1 North. At the 2026 NBL1 National Finals, the Rollers reached the championship game, where they defeated the Forestville Eagles 70–67 in overtime to win the NBL1 National championship.
