= Ipswich Force =

- Leagues: NBL1 North
- Founded: 1986
- History: Ipswich Eagles; 1986–2006; Ipswich Force; 2007–present
- Arena: Ipswich Basketball Stadium
- Location: Ipswich, Queensland
- Team colors: Green, yellow & white
- President: Jo Day
- Vice-president: James Osborne
- Head coach: M: Colby Stefanovic; W: Dean Aspland
- Championships: 1 (2023) (M); 0 (W)
- Website: NBL1.com.au

Ipswich Force is a NBL1 North club based in Ipswich, Queensland. The club fields a team in both the Men's and Women's NBL1 North. The club is a division of Ipswich Basketball Association (IBA), the major administrative basketball organisation in the region. The Force play their home games at Llewellyn Stadium.

== Club history ==
Ipswich Basketball was founded in 1962. 1986 saw the formation of the Queensland Basketball League (QBL) with both a men's and women's competition. Ipswich, trading as the Eagles, entered a team into both the Men's QBL and Women's QBL. In the QBL's inaugural season, the Eagles men reached the final, where they faced the Townsville Suns. The Eagles and the Suns won seven matches in a row to start the year, until they met in July and the Suns prevailed. In 1987 and 1994, the Ipswich women's team reached the championship game, but fell short both times, losing to the Mackay Meteorettes in 1987 and the Cairns Dolphins in 1994.

In November 2006, Ipswich Basketball renamed their representative sides the Ipswich Force for the 2007 season, ending the Eagles moniker.

In 2013, the Force reached the QBL women's grand final, where they were beaten 76–59 by the Mackay Meteorettes.

For the 2020 season, the Force joined the newly established NBL1 North, which replaced the QBL.

In 2023, the Force men won the NBL1 North championship with a 2–1 grand final series victory over the Gold Coast Rollers. In 2026, the Force returned to the NBL1 North grand final series, where they lost 2–0 to the Rollers.
