= Gladstone Port City Power =

- Founded: 2004
- Dissolved: 2019
- History: Gladstone Port City Power; 2004–2019
- Arena: Kev Broome Stadium
- Location: Gladstone, Queensland
- Team colors: Navy blue, yellow & white
- Championships: 0 (M); 3 (2009, 2010, 2011) (W)

Gladstone Port City Power is a former Queensland Basketball League (QBL) club based in Gladstone, Queensland. The club was a division of Gladstone Amateur Basketball Association (GABA), the major administrative basketball organisation in the region. The Power played their home games at Kev Broome Stadium.

== Club history ==
The Power entered the Queensland Australian Basketball League (QABL) in 2004, fielding both a men's and women's team. They replaced the departing Tweed Coast Slammers in the Southern Cross Division.

In 2009, the Power women become champions for the first time in club history when they defeated the South West Metro Pirates 102–98 in overtime in the grand final. It was a remarkable turnaround for the team, who won just a handful of matches in their two previous seasons. The team was led by WNBL players Jessica Bibby, Natalie Hurst and Katie Rose and college player Diana Neves. The women went on to claim three QBL championships in a row behind player-coach Jessica Bibby, with titles also coming in 2010 and 2011. They reached the 2012 grand final but was denied the four-peat by the Mackay Meteorettes, who defeated the Power 78–71.

In 2015, the Power men qualified for the finals for the first time in club history, where in the semi-finals they lost 78–77 in overtime to the Brisbane Capitals. The women's team reached the 2015 grand final, where they were defeated 2–0 in the best-of-three series by the Rockhampton Cyclones.

Following the 2019 QBL season, the league was rebranded as NBL1 North. The Power subsequently did not enter the new competition for the 2020 season. The team joined the Queensland State League (QSL) in 2021.
