= Gold Coast Rollers (NBL1 North) =

- Leagues: NBL1 North
- Founded: 1986
- History: Gold Coast Cougars; 1986–1989; Gold Coast Warriors; 1990–2001; Gold Coast Goannas/Gliders; 2002–2010; Gold Coast Rollers; 2011–present
- Arena: Carrara Indoor Stadium
- Location: Gold Coast, Queensland
- Team colors: Blue and white
- President: Rebecca Morris
- General manager: Joel McInnes
- Head coach: M: Anthony Petrie; W: Pero Cameron
- Championships: 4 (1987, 1988, 2022, 2026) (M); 0 (W)
- Website: NBL1.com.au

Gold Coast Rollers is a NBL1 North club based in Gold Coast, Queensland. The club fields a team in both the Men's and Women's NBL1 North. The club is a division of Gold Coast City Regional Basketball Association, the major administrative basketball organisation in the region. The Rollers play their home games at Carrara Indoor Stadium.

== Club history ==
In 1959, the Gold Coast Amateur Basketball Association was established.

The Queensland State Basketball League (QSBL) began in 1986, and in 1987, the Cougars men won their first championship. They went on to win their second title a year later, defeating the Townsville Suns in back-to-back grand finals. Following a Gold Coast Cougars team entering the National Basketball League in 1990, the club changed their name to Gold Coast Warriors. In 1994, the QSBL joined the Continental Basketball Association (CBA) and became the association's North Conference; Gold Coast was one of 12 teams in the conference's inaugural season. In 1998, the Warriors hosted the CBA National Grand Finals, marking the first time the National Finals were held in Queensland.

In 2002, the club went through name changes, with the men's team being renamed the Goannas and the women's team being renamed the Gliders. In 2007, the Goannas reached the QABL Grand Final series, where they were defeated 2–0 by the Cairns Marlins.

In 2011, both teams were rebranded as Gold Coast Rollers.

In 2019, both teams made grand final appearances, with both finishing as runners-up.

For the 2020 season, the Rollers joined the newly-established NBL1 North, which replaced the QBL. In 2022, the Rollers men won the NBL1 North championship. In 2023, the men again reached the grand final series. In 2026, the men won the NBL1 North championship. At the 2026 NBL1 National Finals, the Rollers men reached the championship game, where they defeated the Forestville Eagles 70–67 in overtime to win the NBL1 National championship.
