= NBL1 North =

Australian basketball league

- Current season, competition or edition: 2026 NBL1 season
- Formerly: State Basketball League; 1986–1993; CBA North; 1994–1998; ABA North; 1999–2001; Queensland Australian Basketball League; 2002–2008; Queensland Basketball League; 2009–2019
- Sport: Basketball
- Founded: 1986
- First season: 1986
- No. of teams: M: 13; W: 13
- Country: Australia
- Continent: FIBA Oceania (Oceania)
- Most recent champions: M: Gold Coast Rollers (4th title); W: Mackay Meteorettes (5th title)
- Most titles: M: Cairns Marlins (9 titles); W: Southern Districts Spartans (12 titles)
- Website: NBL1.com.au/North

NBL1 North, formerly the Queensland Basketball League (QBL), is a semi-professional basketball league in Queensland, Australia, comprising both a men's and women's competition. In 2020, Basketball Queensland partnered with the National Basketball League (NBL) to bring NBL1 to Queensland. NBL1 replaced the former QBL to create more professional pathways and opportunities for men and women playing basketball in Queensland. As a result, the QBL became the north conference of NBL1.

In 2022, the league expanded into the Northern Territory with the addition of a club from Darwin.

== History ==
The league was formed in 1986 as the State Basketball League with eight inaugural clubs. In 1994, the Queensland league joined the Continental Basketball Association (CBA) to become the competition's North Conference. The CBA was restructured as the Australian Basketball Association (ABA) in 1999.

In 2002, the league became known as the Queensland Australian Basketball League (QABL). Around this time, the QABL set up a division system to separate the north and south teams within the state: the Sunstate (North Queensland) and Southern Cross (South Queensland) divisions. Following the 2006 season, the QABL restructured the competition, which saw the two divisions combining to have a statewide league of only one division for the 2007 season. The ABA was abandoned following the 2008 season, resulting in the QABL becoming an independent league again. The QABL was rebranded as the QBL for the 2009 season.

In October 2019, Basketball Queensland and the National Basketball League (NBL) announced a new partnership to bring NBL1 to Queensland in 2020, with NBL1 replacing the QBL. On 15 January 2020, the QBL was officially renamed NBL1 North and became the north conference of NBL1. However, due to the COVID-19 pandemic, the 2020 season was cancelled.

For the 2022 season, the NBL1 North had a club from Darwin – the Darwin Salties – represented for the first time under the joint management of Darwin Basketball Association (DBA) and Basketball Northern Territory (BNT). It saw the NBL1 become the first Australian sport league to have clubs based in and playing out of every state and territory in Australia. Following the 2024 season, the Salties withdrew from the NBL1 North after three seasons due to financial difficulties.

== Current clubs ==
Colours	Club	City	State	Arena	Joined NBL1 North
	Brisbane Capitals	Brisbane	Queensland	Auchenflower Stadium	2020
(Dolphins) (Marlins)	Cairns Dolphins/Cairns Marlins	Cairns	Queensland	Trinity Ford Stadium	2020
	Gold Coast Rollers	Gold Coast	Queensland	Carrara Indoor Stadium	2020
	Ipswich Force	Ipswich	Queensland	Ipswich Basketball Stadium	2020
	Logan Thunder	Logan	Queensland	Cornubia Park Sports Centre	2020
	Mackay Meteorettes/Mackay Meteors	Mackay	Queensland	Mackay Basketball Stadium	2020
	North Gold Coast Seahawks	Gold Coast	Queensland	Runaway Bay Indoor Stadium	2022
	Northside Wizards	Brisbane	Queensland	Northside Indoor Sports Centre	2021
	Rockhampton Cyclones/Rockhampton Rockets	Rockhampton	Queensland	Bravus Arena	2020
	South West Metro Pirates	Brisbane	Queensland	Hibiscus Stadium	2020
	Southern Districts Spartans	Brisbane	Queensland	Rowland Cowan Stadium	2020
	Sunshine Coast Phoenix	Sunshine Coast	Queensland	Maroochydore Stadium	2020
	Townsville Flames/Townsville Heat	Townsville	Queensland	Carmichael Ford Stadium	2020

== List of Champions ==
Team	Total Titles	Men's		Women's		Notes
Team	Total Titles	Titles	Winning seasons	Titles	Winning seasons	Notes
Brisbane Spartans/Southern Districts Spartans	18	6	1992, 1995, 1999, 2005, 2006, 2025	12	1995, 1996, 1998, 1999, 2000, 2003, 2004, 2005, 2006, 2017, 2018, 2019	
Brisbane Brewers/Brisbane Capitals	10	2	2002, 2019	8	1986, 1988, 1989, 1990, 1991, 1992, 2001, 2002	Won the women's inaugural title in 1986.
Cairns Dolphins/Cairns Marlins	10	9	1993, 1994, 1997, 1998, 2001, 2004, 2007, 2009, 2016	1	1994	
Townsville Flames/Townsville Heat/Townsville Sunbirds/Townsville Suns	10	5	1986, 1989, 2000, 2017, 2018	5	1993, 1997, 2007, 2008, 2022	Won the men's inaugural title in 1986.
Mackay Meteorettes/Mackay Meteors	10	5	2011, 2012, 2015, 2021, 2024	5	1987, 2012, 2013, 2014, 2026	
Rockhampton Cyclones/Rockhampton Rockets	8	5	1996, 2008, 2010, 2013, 2014	3	2015, 2016, 2024	
Gold Coast Cougars/Gold Coast Rollers	4	4	1987, 1988, 2022, 2026	0		
Gladstone Port City Power	3	0		3	2009, 2010, 2011	
Toowoomba Mountaineers	2	2	1990, 1991	0		
Logan Thunder	2	0		2	2021, 2025	
South West Metro Pirates	1	1	2003	0		
Northside Wizards	1	0		1	2023	
Ipswich Force	1	1	2023	0		
