= Dean Brogan =

Australian rules footballer

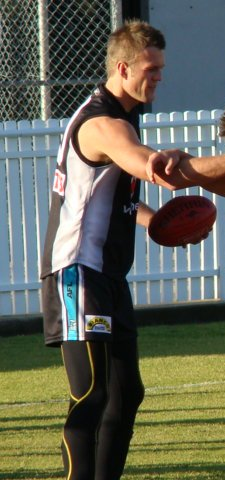
- Brogan in 2007

Personal information
- Full name: Dean Scott Brogan
- Nickname: Brogs
- Born: 14 December 1978 (age 47); Adelaide, South Australia
- Original teams: Christies Beach (SFL); South Adelaide (SANFL)
- Draft: No. 26, 2000 Rookie Draft, Port Adelaide
- Height: 201 cm (6 ft 7 in)
- Weight: 100 kg (220 lb)
- Position: Ruckman

Playing career^{1}
Years	Club	Games (Goals)
2000–2011	Port Adelaide	174 (50)
2012–2013	Greater Western Sydney	19 (3)
Total		193 (53)
- ^{1} Playing statistics correct to the end of 2013.

Career highlights
- Port Adelaide premiership player 2004; Showdown Medal Rd.6 2009 (Showdown XX); SFL "Greatest Exports Team" - Ruck

Dean Brogan
Personal information
- Listed height: 201 cm (6 ft 7 in)
- Listed weight: 100 kg (220 lb)

Career information
- Playing career: 1998–1999
- Position: Power forward
- Number: 42

Career history
- 1998: Adelaide 36ers
- 1998–1999: Newcastle Falcons

Career highlights
- NBL champion (1998)

Dean Scott Brogan (born 14 December 1978) is a former professional Australian rules footballer who played for the Port Adelaide Football Club and Greater Western Sydney Giants in the Australian Football League (AFL). He also played basketball professionally in the National Basketball League (NBL) and won an NBL championship with his hometown Adelaide 36ers in 1998. He is widely regarded as the only person in the world to have achieved the remarkable feat of winning both an NBL Championship and an AFL Premiership.

== NBL career ==
=== Adelaide 36ers ===
Dean Brogan attended the Australian Institute of Sport (AIS) from 1996 to 1997, before returning to Adelaide with the Adelaide 36ers in the National Basketball League (NBL) under the rookie coaching of Australian and Adelaide basketball legend Phil Smyth. He made his NBL debut on 31 January 1998 with what would be a career high 7 points in the 36ers 125–86 home win over the Townsville Crocodiles at the Clipsal Powerhouse. At 6 ft 7 in (201 cm) tall, Brogan was a Power forward when he played basketball.

By Brogan's own admission, he was a "bit of a punk back then" and he thought that coming out of the AIS he would walk into the 36ers starting line up. However, Adelaide had both Perth Wildcats 1995 championship player Martin Cattalini as well as club legend Mark Davis in front of him for the Power forward position. That and, again by his own admission, that he was a poor shooter of the ball, meant he was used as a bench / development player by Phil Smyth in his rookie NBL season.

Brogan was part of the 36ers team that won the 1998 NBL championship over the South East Melbourne Magic with a 2–0 clean sweep of the Grand Final series. Brogan didn't get on the court in Adelaide's 100–93 home win at the Powerhouse, and was only subbed on late in Game 2 at the National Tennis Centre with the 36ers holding an unbeatable lead. Within moments of coming on, Brogan was fouled and described his two free throws as "almost air balled" (teammate Rupert Sapwell later jokingly asked "what differentiates that from any other game?"). However, after missing his second shot, he then hustled back on defence and took a charge from the Magic's Frank Drmic causing a turnover and giving the ball straight back to the 36ers. Adelaide won the game over the Magic (who were the minor premiers with an imposing 28–6 record) 90-62 for their second NBL title.

=== Newcastle Falcons ===
With Cattalini and Davis still with the 36ers for the 1998–99 NBL season, plus the addition of centre/forward David Stiff to the squad, Brogan felt his chances of breaking into the Adelaide starting line up were limited and he moved to play for the struggling Newcastle Falcons after the 36ers 1998 championship win. Ironically by leaving Adelaide he missed out on the 36ers back-to-back championships as his former team also won the 1998–99 NBL championship..

Following his season with the Falcons, at the age of 20, Brogan decided to give up basketball to focus on Australian rules football. His former 36ers teammates jokingly claimed that Brogan made the correct decision to concentrate on football with Martin Cattalini saying on the 1990s club DVD entitled "Title Town" that "He made the absolute right decision to play football. As a basketball player he made a very good footballer but as a footballer he made a shit basketball player.".

Dean Brogan played 43 NBL games, 17 with Adelaide and 26 with Newcastle.

== AFL career ==
=== Port Adelaide (2000–2011) ===
Following his season with the Newcastle Falcons, Brogan was introduced to Port Adelaide Football Club head coach Mark Williams by his former 36ers coach Phil Smyth who happened to live on the same street as Williams in Adelaide. From there, Brogan trained with Port Adelaide and impressed Williams enough to be rookie drafted by the club in 1999. He spent the 2000 season playing for South Adelaide in the SANFL, attempting to transition his skills from basketball to football and a year later made his AFL debut in 2001. Under coach Mark Williams the Power became just that in the AFL and qualified for their first ever AFL Grand Final in 2004 where they defeated three-time defending champions the Brisbane Lions to win the 2004 Premiership in front of 77,671 at the Melbourne Cricket Ground. As the team's starting ruckman Brogan became the first sportsman to win national titles in both the NBL and AFL.

With the recurrent injuries and subsequent retirement of Matthew Primus between 2003 and 2005, Brogan's fine work in tandem with fellow Power and 2006 and 2007 All-Australian ruckman Brendon Lade continued to form an integral part of Port's hopes in the 2009 season before Lade's retirement at season's end. Brogan went on to win the Showdown medal in Round 6, 2009 for his best on ground effort against the Adelaide Crows in Showdown XXVI. He was named as vice-captain of the club in the lead up to the 2010 season.

=== Greater Western Sydney (2012) ===
In June 2011, at the age of 32, Brogan announced his retirement from AFL football at the conclusion of the 2011 season. However, he later decided against retirement and was traded to the new expansion Greater Western Sydney Giants.

== Off field controversies ==
In 2006, Brogan was involved in an incident at Adelaide airport in which he punched Adelaide Crows fan Dale Mortimer after being insulted, breaking Mortimer's nose. He pleaded guilty and was fined $750.

In July 2007, Brogan pleaded guilty to assaulting an Adelaide surgeon in October 2005, and was fined $1000.

== Career statistics ==
=== National Basketball League ===
Legend
GP	Games played	GS	Games started	MPG	Minutes per game
FG%	Field goal percentage	3P%	3-point field goal percentage	FT%	Free throw percentage
RPG	Rebounds per game	APG	Assists per game	SPG	Steals per game
BPG	Blocks per game	PPG	Points per game	**Bold**	Career high

†	Denotes season(s) in which Brogan won an NBL championship

Year	Team	GP	GS	MPG	FG%	3P%	FT%	RPG	APG	SPG	BPG	PPG
1998†	Adelaide 36ers	17	0	7.3	**.613**	.000	.200	1.5	1.0	0.1	**0.1**	**2.4**
1998–99	Newcastle Falcons	**26**	0	**11.7**	.381	.000	**.333**	**1.9**	**1.1**	**0.3**	0.0	2.1
Career		43	0	10.0	.457	.000	.278	1.7	1.0	0.2	0.0	2.2

=== Australian Football League ===
Legend
G	Goals	K	Kicks	D	Disposals	T	Tackles
B	Behinds	H	Handballs	M	Marks	H/O	Hit-outs

Season	Team	No.	Games	Totals								Averages (per game)							
Season	Team	No.	Games	G	B	K	H	D	M	T	H/O	G	B	K	H	D	M	T	H/O
2001	Port Adelaide	42	7	3	1	11	25	36	14	11	51	0.4	0.1	1.6	3.6	5.1	2.0	1.6	7.3
2002	Port Adelaide	20	1	0	0	2	0	2	0	0	0	0.0	0.0	2.0	0.0	2.0	0.0	0.0	0.0
2003	Port Adelaide	20	23	5	2	97	149	246	95	28	396	0.2	0.1	4.2	6.5	10.7	4.1	1.2	17.2
2004	Port Adelaide	20	23	14	3	120	153	273	111	44	328	0.6	0.1	5.2	6.7	11.9	4.8	1.9	14.3
2005	Port Adelaide	20	14	7	3	71	66	137	51	27	136	0.5	0.2	5.1	4.7	9.8	3.6	1.9	9.7
2006	Port Adelaide	20	15	2	5	70	93	163	63	32	162	0.1	0.3	4.7	6.2	10.9	4.2	2.1	10.8
2007	Port Adelaide	20	18	0	4	70	146	216	89	41	222	0.0	0.2	3.9	8.1	12.0	4.9	2.3	12.3
2008	Port Adelaide	20	21	7	4	101	174	275	98	53	397	0.3	0.2	4.8	8.3	13.1	4.7	2.5	18.9
2009	Port Adelaide	20	20	9	1	98	144	242	73	51	432	0.5	0.1	4.9	7.2	12.1	3.7	2.6	21.6
2010	Port Adelaide	20	20	1	2	133	134	267	68	62	475	0.1	0.1	6.7	6.7	13.4	3.4	3.1	23.8
2011	Port Adelaide	20	12	2	1	84	83	167	27	38	249	0.2	0.1	7.0	6.9	13.9	2.3	3.2	20.8
2012	Greater Western Sydney	10	9	0	0	58	42	100	35	12	142	0.0	0.0	6.4	4.7	11.1	3.9	1.3	15.8
2013	Greater Western Sydney	50	10	3	3	55	50	105	31	23	179	0.3	0.3	5.5	5.0	10.5	3.1	2.3	17.9
Career			193	53	29	968	1261	2229	755	422	3169	0.3	0.2	5.0	6.5	11.5	3.9	2.2	16.4

== Personal life ==
Brogan is the brother of former Australian Opals basketball player Michelle Brogan.

Brogan's nephew, Che, joined the Adelaide 36ers of the NBL as a development player in 2025. Che chose to wear the number 42 jersey, the same number Brogan wore with the 36ers in the 1998 Championship win.
