= All-NBL Team =

Basketball award

The All-NBL Team is an annual National Basketball League (NBL) honour bestowed on the best players in the league following every NBL season. The team has been selected in every season since the league's second year in 1980.

The All-NBL Team has previously been chosen with three 'outside' players and two 'inside' players for each team. For the 2023–24 season, the league introduced position-less teams, meaning any five players can be selected regardless of what position they play (i.e. guard, forward, centre).

As of the 2025–26 season, the All-NBL First Team and All-NBL Second Team are voted on by head coaches, assistant coaches and captains. If two players are tied in the voting for an All-NBL team spot, a countback will first be conducted, with the position awarded to the player who received the most First-Team votes. Only if the tie still cannot be separated will a panel of experts step in to determine which player receives the award.

Between 1980 and 1983, the Most Valuable Player (MVP) did not feature in the All-NBL Team.

== Selections ==
Player (X)	Denotes the number of times the player has been selected
**Player** **(in bold text)**	Indicates the player who won the NBL Most Valuable Player in the same year

=== 1980 to 1986 ===
From the 1980 season to 1986 season, the All-NBL Team was composed of one team.

Season	First team	
Season	Players	Teams
1980	Brian Banks	Brisbane Bullets
1980	Ian Davies	Launceston Casino City
1980	Herb McEachin	Canberra Cannons
1980	Danny Morseu	St Kilda Saints
1980	Ken Richardson	West Adelaide Bearcats
1980	Cal Stamp	Canberra Cannons
1981	Al Green	West Adelaide Bearcats
1981	Danny Morseu (2)	St Kilda Saints
1981	David Nelson	Canberra Cannons
1981	Rocky Smith	St Kilda Saints
1981	Owen Wells	Newcastle Falcons
1982	James Crawford	Geelong Supercats
1982	Leroy Loggins	West Adelaide Bearcats
1982	George Morrow	Newcastle Falcons
1982	Larry Sengstock	Brisbane Bullets
1982	Phil Smyth	St Kilda Saints
1983	Cal Bruton	Geelong Supercats
1983	James Crawford (2)	Geelong Supercats
1983	Leroy Loggins (2)	West Adelaide Bearcats
1983	George Morrow (2)	Newcastle Falcons
1983	Phil Smyth (2)	Canberra Cannons
1984	Cal Bruton (2)	Geelong Supercats
1984	Dan Clausen	Adelaide 36ers
1984	James Crawford (3)	Geelong Supercats
1984	**Leroy Loggins** (3)	Brisbane Bullets
1984	Phil Smyth (3)	Canberra Cannons
1985	**Ray Borner**	Coburg Giants
1985	Al Green (2)	Adelaide 36ers
1985	Leroy Loggins (4)	Brisbane Bullets
1985	Kendal Pinder	Sydney Supersonics
1985	Phil Smyth (4)	Canberra Cannons
1986	Steve Carfino	Hobart Devils
1986	Mark Davis	Adelaide 36ers
1986	Andrew Gaze	Melbourne Tigers
1986	Jim Foster	Coburg Giants
1986	**Leroy Loggins** (5)	Brisbane Bullets

=== 1987 to 1991 ===
From the 1987 season to 1991 season, the All-NBL Team was composed of two teams.

Season	First team		Second team	
Season	Players	Teams	Players	Teams
1987	Steve Carfino (2)	Hobart Devils	Scott Fisher	North Melbourne Giants
1987	James Crawford (4)	Perth Wildcats	Vince Hinchen	Eastside Spectres
1987	**Mark Davis** (2)	Adelaide 36ers	Marc Ridlen	Sydney Supersonics
1987	Andrew Gaze (2)	Melbourne Tigers	Phil Smyth (5)	Canberra Cannons
1987	**Leroy Loggins** (6)	Brisbane Bullets	Paul Stanley	Hobart Devils
1988	Mark Davis (3)	Adelaide 36ers	Steve Carfino (3)	Sydney Kings
1988	Tim Dillon	North Melbourne Giants	Scott Fisher (2)	North Melbourne Giants
1988	Andrew Gaze (3)	Melbourne Tigers	**Joe Hurst**	Hobart Devils
1988	Leroy Loggins (7)	Brisbane Bullets	Wayne McDaniel	Newcastle Falcons
1988	Phil Smyth (6)	Canberra Cannons	Dean Uthoff	Eastside Spectres
1989	Mark Davis (4)	Adelaide 36ers	Emery Atkinson	Canberra Cannons
1989	Andrew Gaze (4)	Melbourne Tigers	Steve Carfino (4)	Sydney Kings
1989	**Scott Fisher** (3)	North Melbourne Giants	Jerry Everett	Newcastle Falcons
1989	Kent Lockhart	Eastside Spectres	Wayne McDaniel (2)	Hobart Devils
1989	Phil Smyth (7)	Canberra Cannons	Dean Uthoff (2)	Eastside Spectres
1990	Andrew Gaze (5)	Melbourne Tigers	Bruce Bolden	Eastside Spectres
1990	Scott Fisher (4)	North Melbourne Giants	Joe Hillman	North Melbourne Giants
1990	Leroy Loggins (8)	Brisbane Bullets	Damian Keogh	Sydney Kings
1990	Andre Moore	Brisbane Bullets	Kent Lockhart (2)	Eastside Spectres
1990	**Derek Rucker**	Brisbane Bullets	Dave Simmons	Melbourne Tigers
1991	Mark Davis (5)	Adelaide 36ers	Bruce Bolden (2)	Eastside Spectres
1991	**Andrew Gaze** (6)	Melbourne Tigers	John Dorge	Geelong Supercats
1991	Ricky Grace	Perth Wildcats	Butch Hays	Adelaide 36ers
1991	Scott Fisher (5)	North Melbourne Giants	Leroy Loggins (9)	Brisbane Bullets
1991	Mike Mitchell	Gold Coast Rollers	Dwayne McClain	Sydney Kings

=== 1992 to 2012–13 ===
From the 1992 season to 2012–13 season, the All-NBL Team was composed of three teams (except in 1997 when only two teams were named).

Season	First team		Second team		Third team	
Season	Players	Teams	Players	Teams	Players	Teams
1992	**Andrew Gaze** (7)	Melbourne Tigers	Bruce Bolden (3)	South East Melbourne Magic	Mark Bradtke	Adelaide 36ers
1992	**Scott Fisher** (6)	North Melbourne Giants	Lanard Copeland	Melbourne Tigers	Mark Davis (6)	Adelaide 36ers
1992	Dwayne McClain (2)	Sydney Kings	Andre LaFleur	Gold Coast Rollers	Terry Dozier	Newcastle Falcons
1992	Doug Overton	Illawarra Hawks	Leroy Loggins (10)	Brisbane Bullets	Butch Hays (2)	Adelaide 36ers
1992	Andrew Vlahov	Perth Wildcats	Jason Reese	Canberra Cannons	Robert Rose	South East Melbourne Magic
1992					Everette Stephens	Newcastle Falcons
1992					Melvin Thomas	Illawarra Hawks
1993	Terry Dozier (2)	Newcastle Falcons	Bruce Bolden (4)	South East Melbourne Magic	Dwayne McClain (3)	Sydney Kings
1993	Andrew Gaze (8)	Melbourne Tigers	Scott Fisher (7)	Perth Wildcats	Rodney Monroe	Canberra Cannons
1993	Leroy Loggins (11)	Brisbane Bullets	Ricky Grace (2)	Perth Wildcats	Andre Moore (2)	Brisbane Bullets
1993	**Robert Rose** (2)	South East Melbourne Magic	Butch Hays (3)	Illawarra Hawks	Scott Ninnis	Adelaide 36ers
1993	Melvin Thomas (2)	Illawarra Hawks	Andre LaFleur (2)	Gold Coast Rollers	Andrew Vlahov (2)	Perth Wildcats
1994	Mark Bradtke (2)	Melbourne Tigers	Mark Davis (7)	Adelaide 36ers	James Crawford (5)	Perth Wildcats
1994	**Andrew Gaze** (9)	Melbourne Tigers	Shane Heal	Brisbane Bullets	Butch Hays (4)	Illawarra Hawks
1994	Leroy Loggins (12)	Brisbane Bullets	Tony Ronaldson	South East Melbourne Magic	Pat Reidy	North Melbourne Giants
1994	Darryl McDonald	North Melbourne Giants	Robert Rose (3)	Adelaide 36ers	Derek Rucker (2)	Newcastle Falcons
1994	Leon Trimmingham	Sydney Kings	Melvin Thomas (3)	Illawarra Hawks	Andrew Vlahov (3)	Perth Wildcats
1995	John Dorge (2)	South East Melbourne Magic	Butch Hays (5)	Newcastle Falcons	Ray Borner (2)	Canberra Cannons
1995	**Andrew Gaze** (10)	Melbourne Tigers	Leroy Loggins (13)	Brisbane Bullets	Ricky Grace (3)	Perth Wildcats
1995	Darryl McDonald (2)	North Melbourne Giants	Derek Rucker (3)	Townsville Suns	Chris Jent	North Melbourne Giants
1995	Robert Rose (4)	Adelaide 36ers	Melvin Thomas (4)	Illawarra Hawks	Adonis Jordan	South East Melbourne Magic
1995	Reggie Smith	Newcastle Falcons	Leon Trimmingham (2)	Sydney Kings	Pat Reidy (2)	North Melbourne Giants
1995	Andrew Vlahov (4)	Perth Wildcats			Jervaughn Scales	Canberra Cannons
1995					Clarence Tyson	Townsville Suns
1996	Mark Bradtke (3)	Melbourne Tigers	Isaac Burton	Sydney Kings	Lanard Copeland (2)	Melbourne Tigers
1996	**Andrew Gaze** (11)	Melbourne Tigers	Shane Heal (2)	Sydney Kings	Butch Hays (6)	Newcastle Falcons
1996	Darryl McDonald (3)	North Melbourne Giants	Tony Ronaldson (2)	South East Melbourne Magic	Mike Mitchell (2)	Brisbane Bullets
1996	Ray Owes	Geelong Supercats	David Van Dyke	Newcastle Falcons	Pat Reidy (3)	North Melbourne Giants
1996	Robert Rose (5)	Canberra Cannons	Andrew Vlahov (5)	Perth Wildcats	Melvin Thomas (5)	Sydney Kings
1996					Clarence Tyson (2)	Townsville Suns
1996					Steve Woodberry	Brisbane Bullets
1997	Mark Bradtke (4)	Melbourne Tigers	Simon Dwight	Canberra Cannons		
1997	**Andrew Gaze** (12)	Melbourne Tigers	Leroy Loggins (14)	Brisbane Bullets		
1997	Robert Rose (6)	Canberra Cannons	Brett Maher	Adelaide 36ers		
1997	Derek Rucker (4)	Townsville Suns	Darryl McDonald (4)	North Melbourne Giants		
1997	Clarence Tyson (3)	Townsville Suns	Steve Woodberry (2)	Brisbane Bullets		
1998	**Andrew Gaze** (13)	Melbourne Tigers	Kevin Brooks	Adelaide 36ers	Mark Bradtke (5)	Melbourne Tigers
1998	Ben Melmeth	Newcastle Falcons	Chuck Kornegay	Brisbane Bullets	Frank Drmic	South East Melbourne Magic
1998	Derek Rucker (5)	Townsville Suns	Sam Mackinnon	South East Melbourne Magic	Ricky Grace (4)	Perth Wildcats
1998	Ray Owes (2)	Townsville Suns	Brett Maher (2)	Adelaide 36ers	Clint McDaniel	South East Melbourne Magic
1998	Steve Woodberry (3)	Brisbane Bullets	Clayton Ritter	Illawarra Hawks	Tony Ronaldson (3)	South East Melbourne Magic
1998–99	Mark Bradtke (6)	Melbourne Tigers	C. J. Bruton	Wollongong Hawks	Acie Earl	Sydney Kings
1998–99	Kevin Brooks (2)	Adelaide 36ers	Darnell Mee	Adelaide 36ers	Sam Mackinnon (2)	Townsville Crocodiles
1998–99	Lanard Copeland (3)	Melbourne Tigers	Paul Rogers	Perth Wildcats	Brett Maher (3)	Adelaide 36ers
1998–99	Andrew Gaze (14)	Melbourne Tigers	Robert Rose (7)	Townsville Crocodiles	Ben Melmeth (2)	Newcastle Falcons
1998–99	**Steve Woodberry** (4)	Brisbane Bullets	Marcus Timmons	Melbourne Tigers	Melvin Thomas (6)	Canberra Cannons
1999–2000	Mark Bradtke (7)	Melbourne Tigers	Martin Cattalini	Adelaide 36ers	Lanard Copeland (4)	Melbourne Tigers
1999–2000	Andrew Gaze (15)	Melbourne Tigers	Andrew Goodwin	Townsville Crocodiles	Bennett Davison	Melbourne Tigers
1999–2000	Sam Mackinnon (3)	Townsville Crocodiles	Darnell Mee (2)	Adelaide 36ers	Ricky Grace (5)	Perth Wildcats
1999–2000	Brett Maher (4)	Adelaide 36ers	Jason Smith	Victoria Titans	Darryl McDonald (5)	Victoria Titans
1999–2000	**Paul Rogers** (2)	Perth Wildcats	Andrew Vlahov (6)	Perth Wildcats	Robert Rose (8)	Townsville Crocodiles
2000–01	Mark Bradtke (8)	Melbourne Tigers	Chris Anstey	Victoria Titans	Ben Knight	Cairns Taipans
2000–01	Ricky Grace (6)	Perth Wildcats	Andrew Gaze (16)	Melbourne Tigers	Darryl McDonald (6)	Victoria Titans
2000–01	Darnell Mee (3)	Adelaide 36ers	Shane Heal (3)	Sydney Kings	Glen Saville	Wollongong Hawks
2000–01	Jason Smith (2)	Victoria Titans	Matthew Nielsen	Sydney Kings	Melvin Thomas (7)	Wollongong Hawks
2000–01	**Robert Rose** (9)	Townsville Crocodiles	Paul Rogers (3)	Perth Wildcats	Jayson Wells	Canberra Cannons
2001–02	Chris Anstey (2)	Victoria Titans	Simon Dwight (2)	West Sydney Razorbacks	George Banks	Canberra Cannons
2001–02	**Mark Bradtke** (9)	Melbourne Tigers	Willie Farley	Adelaide 36ers	Shane Heal (4)	Sydney Kings
2001–02	Lanard Copeland (5)	Melbourne Tigers	John Rillie	West Sydney Razorbacks	Brett Maher (5)	Adelaide 36ers
2001–02	Ricky Grace (7)	Perth Wildcats	Robert Rose (10)	Townsville Crocodiles	Darryl McDonald (7)	Victoria Titans
2001–02	Paul Rogers (4)	Perth Wildcats	Randy Rutherford	Brisbane Bullets	Tony Ronaldson (4)	Victoria Titans
2002–03	Mark Bradtke (10)	Melbourne Tigers	Rob Feaster	Perth Wildcats	Martin Cattalini (2)	Adelaide 36ers
2002–03	Ricky Grace (8)	Perth Wildcats	Matthew Nielsen (2)	Sydney Kings	Cortez Groves	Wollongong Hawks
2002–03	Shane Heal (5)	Sydney Kings	Pat Reidy (4)	Townsville Crocodiles	Kavossy Franklin	Sydney Kings
2002–03	Brett Maher (6)	Adelaide 36ers	John Rillie (2)	West Sydney Razorbacks	Robert Rose (11)	Townsville Crocodiles
2002–03	**Chris Williams**	Sydney Kings	Glen Saville (2)	Wollongong Hawks	Wayne Turner	Townsville Crocodiles
2003–04	Stephen Black	Brisbane Bullets	Bobby Brannen	Brisbane Bullets	C. J. Bruton (2)	Sydney Kings
2003–04	Mark Bradtke (11)	Melbourne Tigers	Martin Cattalini (3)	Adelaide 36ers	Mike Chappell	New Zealand Breakers
2003–04	Sam Mackinnon (4)	West Sydney Razorbacks	Simon Dwight (3)	West Sydney Razorbacks	Kevin Freeman	Brisbane Bullets
2003–04	**Matthew Nielsen** (3)	Sydney Kings	Ebi Ere	Sydney Kings	Darnell Mee (4)	Wollongong Hawks
2003–04	John Rillie (3)	West Sydney Razorbacks	Glen Saville (3)	Wollongong Hawks	Rashad Tucker	Perth Wildcats
2004–05	Mark Bradtke (12)	Melbourne Tigers	Bobby Brannen (2)	Brisbane Bullets	Stephen Black (2)	Brisbane Bullets
2004–05	Chris Burgess	Cairns Taipans	Brett Maher (7)	Adelaide 36ers	Casey Calvary	Townsville Crocodiles
2004–05	Darnell Mee (5)	Wollongong Hawks	John Rillie (4)	Townsville Crocodiles	Rosell Ellis	Perth Wildcats
2004–05	Jason Smith (3)	Sydney Kings	Dusty Rychart	Adelaide 36ers	Willie Farley (2)	Adelaide 36ers
2004–05	**Brian Wethers**	Hunter Pirates	Glen Saville (4)	Wollongong Hawks	Kavossy Franklin (2)	Hunter Pirates
2005–06	Larry Abney	Townsville Crocodiles	Sam Mackinnon (5)	Brisbane Bullets	Chris Burgess (2)	Cairns Taipans
2005–06	**Chris Anstey** (3)	Melbourne Tigers	Darryl McDonald (8)	Melbourne Tigers	Martin Cattalini (4)	Cairns Taipans
2005–06	C. J. Bruton (3)	Sydney Kings	Shawn Redhage	Perth Wildcats	Darnell Mee (6)	Cairns Taipans
2005–06	Cortez Groves (2)	Wollongong Hawks	Jason Smith (4)	Sydney Kings	Dusty Rychart (2)	Adelaide 36ers
2005–06	Brett Maher (8)	Adelaide 36ers	Dave Thomas	Melbourne Tigers	Glen Saville (5)	Wollongong Hawks
2006–07	Chris Anstey (4)	Melbourne Tigers	Larry Abney (2)	Townsville Crocodiles	Adam Ballinger	Wollongong Hawks
2006–07	Martin Cattalini (5)	Cairns Taipans	Cortez Groves (3)	Wollongong Hawks	C. J. Bruton (4)	Brisbane Bullets
2006–07	**Sam Mackinnon** (6)	Brisbane Bullets	Brad Newley	Townsville Crocodiles	Kavossy Franklin (3)	South Dragons
2006–07	Carlos Powell	New Zealand Breakers	Shawn Redhage (2)	Perth Wildcats	Mike Helms	Singapore Slingers
2006–07	Dave Thomas (2)	Melbourne Tigers	Paul Rogers (5)	Perth Wildcats	Darryl McDonald (9)	Melbourne Tigers
2007–08	**Chris Anstey** (5)	Melbourne Tigers	Adam Ballinger (2)	Adelaide 36ers	Dontaye Draper	Sydney Kings
2007–08	Ebi Ere (2)	Brisbane Bullets	C. J. Bruton (5)	Brisbane Bullets	Kavossy Franklin (4)	Wollongong Hawks
2007–08	Kirk Penney	New Zealand Breakers	James Harvey	Gold Coast Blaze	Darnell Hinson	West Sydney Razorbacks
2007–08	Shawn Redhage (3)	Perth Wildcats	Nathan Jawai	Cairns Taipans	Julius Hodge	Adelaide 36ers
2007–08	Mark Worthington	Sydney Kings	Corey Williams	Townsville Crocodiles	Paul Rogers (6)	Perth Wildcats
2008–09	Chris Anstey (6)	Melbourne Tigers	Adam Ballinger (3)	Adelaide 36ers	Adam Gibson	South Dragons
2008–09	C. J. Bruton (6)	New Zealand Breakers	Shawn Redhage (4)	Perth Wildcats	David Barlow	Melbourne Tigers
2008–09	Ebi Ere (3)	Melbourne Tigers	Glen Saville (6)	Wollongong Hawks	James Harvey (2)	Gold Coast Blaze
2008–09	**Kirk Penney** (2)	New Zealand Breakers	Luke Schenscher	Adelaide 36ers	Joe Ingles	South Dragons
2008–09	Mark Worthington (2)	South Dragons	Corey Williams (2)	Townsville Crocodiles	Matthew Knight	Sydney Spirit
2009–10	Tywain McKee	Wollongong Hawks	Adam Ballinger (4)	Adelaide 36ers	Larry Davidson	Wollongong Hawks
2009–10	Kirk Penney (3)	New Zealand Breakers	C. J. Bruton (7)	New Zealand Breakers	John Gilchrist	Adelaide 36ers
2009–10	Shawn Redhage (5)	Perth Wildcats	Adam Gibson (2)	Gold Coast Blaze	Julius Hodge (2)	Melbourne Tigers
2009–10	Mark Worthington (3)	Melbourne Tigers	Anthony Petrie	Gold Coast Blaze	Glen Saville (7)	Wollongong Hawks
2009–10	**Corey Williams** (3)	Townsville Crocodiles	Ayinde Ubaka	Gold Coast Blaze	Cameron Tragardh	Wollongong Hawks
2010–11	**Gary Ervin**	Wollongong Hawks	Ira Clark	Gold Coast Blaze	Adam Ballinger (5)	Adelaide 36ers
2010–11	Julian Khazzouh	Sydney Kings	Adam Gibson (3)	Gold Coast Blaze	Peter Crawford	Townsville Crocodiles
2010–11	Damian Martin	Perth Wildcats	Glen Saville (8)	Wollongong Hawks	Alex Loughton	Cairns Taipans
2010–11	Kirk Penney (4)	New Zealand Breakers	Luke Schenscher (2)	Townsville Crocodiles	Shawn Redhage (6)	Perth Wildcats
2010–11	Gary Wilkinson	New Zealand Breakers	Corey Williams (4)	Melbourne Tigers	Ayinde Ubaka (2)	Cairns Taipans
2011–12	Thomas Abercrombie	New Zealand Breakers	Peter Crawford (2)	Townsville Crocodiles	Adris De León	Gold Coast Blaze
2011–12	Cedric Jackson	New Zealand Breakers	Adam Gibson (4)	Gold Coast Blaze	Eddie Gill	Townsville Crocodiles
2011–12	Julian Khazzouh (2)	Sydney Kings	Cameron Tragardh (2)	Melbourne Tigers	Daniel Johnson	Adelaide 36ers
2011–12	**Kevin Lisch**	Perth Wildcats	Gary Wilkinson (2)	New Zealand Breakers	Damian Martin (2)	Perth Wildcats
2011–12	Mark Worthington (4)	Gold Coast Blaze	Jamar Wilson	Cairns Taipans	Jesse Wagstaff	Perth Wildcats
2012–13	**Cedric Jackson** (2)	New Zealand Breakers	Gary Ervin (2)	Townsville Crocodiles	Thomas Abercrombie (2)	New Zealand Breakers
2012–13	Matthew Knight (2)	Perth Wildcats	Jonny Flynn	Melbourne Tigers	Ian Crosswhite	Sydney Kings
2012–13	Kevin Lisch (2)	Perth Wildcats	Daniel Johnson (2)	Adelaide 36ers	Adam Gibson (5)	Adelaide 36ers
2012–13	Ben Madgen	Sydney Kings	Damian Martin (3)	Perth Wildcats	Shawn Redhage (7)	Perth Wildcats
2012–13	Seth Scott	Melbourne Tigers	Mika Vukona (2)	New Zealand Breakers	Jamar Wilson (2)	Cairns Taipans

=== 2013–14 to present ===
Since the 2013–14 season, the All-NBL Team has been composed of two teams.

Season	First team		Second team	
Season	Players	Teams	Players	Teams
2013–14	**Rotnei Clarke**	Wollongong Hawks	Jermaine Beal	Perth Wildcats
2013–14	James Ennis	Perth Wildcats	Brian Conklin	Townsville Crocodiles
2013–14	Chris Goulding	Melbourne Tigers	Damian Martin (4)	Perth Wildcats
2013–14	Daniel Johnson (3)	Adelaide 36ers	Mika Vukona	New Zealand Breakers
2013–14	Andrew Ogilvy	Sydney Kings	Sam Young	Sydney Kings
2014–15	Josh Childress	Sydney Kings	Todd Blanchfield	Townsville Crocodiles
2014–15	**Brian Conklin** (2)	Townsville Crocodiles	Ekene Ibekwe	New Zealand Breakers
2014–15	Cedric Jackson (3)	New Zealand Breakers	Matthew Knight (3)	Perth Wildcats
2014–15	Brock Motum	Adelaide 36ers	Jordan McRae	Melbourne United
2014–15	Scottie Wilbekin	Cairns Taipans	Jamar Wilson (3)	Adelaide 36ers
2015–16	Chris Goulding (2)	Melbourne United	Stephen Holt	Melbourne United
2015–16	Daniel Kickert	Melbourne United	Daniel Johnson (4)	Adelaide 36ers
2015–16	**Kevin Lisch** (3)	Illawarra Hawks	Matthew Knight (4)	Perth Wildcats
2015–16	Andrew Ogilvy (2)	Illawarra Hawks	Kirk Penney (5)	Illawarra Hawks
2015–16	Jerome Randle	Adelaide 36ers	Corey Webster	New Zealand Breakers
2016–17	Daniel Johnson (5)	Adelaide 36ers	Torrey Craig	Brisbane Bullets
2016–17	Andrew Ogilvy (3)	Illawarra Hawks	Daniel Kickert (2)	Brisbane Bullets
2016–17	Casey Prather	Perth Wildcats	Kevin Lisch (4)	Sydney Kings
2016–17	**Jerome Randle** (2)	Adelaide 36ers	Brad Newley (2)	Sydney Kings
2016–17	Casper Ware	Melbourne United	Nathan Sobey	Adelaide 36ers
2017–18	Josh Boone	Melbourne United	Mitch Creek	Adelaide 36ers
2017–18	**Bryce Cotton**	Perth Wildcats	Jerome Randle (3)	Sydney Kings
2017–18	Demitrius Conger	Illawarra Hawks	Édgar Sosa	New Zealand Breakers
2017–18	Daniel Johnson (6)	Adelaide 36ers	J. P. Tokoto	Perth Wildcats
2017–18	Casper Ware (2)	Melbourne United	Tai Wesley	Melbourne United
2018–19	**Andrew Bogut**	Sydney Kings	Daniel Johnson (7)	Adelaide 36ers
2018–19	Bryce Cotton (2)	Perth Wildcats	Shawn Long	New Zealand Breakers
2018–19	Nick Kay	Perth Wildcats	Jerome Randle (4)	Sydney Kings
2018–19	Lamar Patterson	Brisbane Bullets	Nathan Sobey (2)	Adelaide 36ers
2018–19	Casper Ware (3)	Melbourne United	Melo Trimble	Cairns Taipans
2019–20	**Bryce Cotton** (3)	Perth Wildcats	Andrew Bogut (2)	Sydney Kings
2019–20	Nick Kay (2)	Perth Wildcats	Scotty Hopson	New Zealand Breakers
2019–20	Scott Machado	Cairns Taipans	D. J. Newbill	Cairns Taipans
2019–20	Lamar Patterson (2)	Brisbane Bullets	Cameron Oliver	Cairns Taipans
2019–20	Jae'Sean Tate	Sydney Kings	Casper Ware (4)	Sydney Kings
2020–21	**Bryce Cotton** (4)	Perth Wildcats	Mitch Creek (2)	South East Melbourne Phoenix
2020–21	Tyler Harvey	Illawarra Hawks	Finn Delany	New Zealand Breakers
2020–21	Jock Landale	Melbourne United	Chris Goulding (3)	Melbourne United
2020–21	John Mooney	Perth Wildcats	Mitch McCarron	Melbourne United
2020–21	Nathan Sobey (3)	Brisbane Bullets	Casper Ware (5)	Sydney Kings
2021–22	**Jaylen Adams**	Sydney Kings	Josh Adams	Tasmania JackJumpers
2021–22	Antonius Cleveland	Illawarra Hawks	Xavier Cooks	Sydney Kings
2021–22	Bryce Cotton (5)	Perth Wildcats	Mitch Creek (3)	South East Melbourne Phoenix
2021–22	Vic Law	Perth Wildcats	Matthew Dellavedova	Melbourne United
2021–22	Jo Lual-Acuil	Melbourne United	Chris Goulding (4)	Melbourne United
2022–23	**Xavier Cooks** (2)	Sydney Kings	Barry Brown Jr.	New Zealand Breakers
2022–23	Bryce Cotton (6)	Perth Wildcats	Chris Goulding (5)	Melbourne United
2022–23	Mitch Creek (4)	South East Melbourne Phoenix	D. J. Hogg	Cairns Taipans
2022–23	Milton Doyle	Tasmania JackJumpers	Dererk Pardon	New Zealand Breakers
2022–23	Derrick Walton	Sydney Kings	Keanu Pinder	Cairns Taipans
2023–24	Gary Clark	Illawarra Hawks	Mitch Creek (5)	South East Melbourne Phoenix
2023–24	**Bryce Cotton** (7)	Perth Wildcats	Milton Doyle (2)	Tasmania JackJumpers
2023–24	Chris Goulding (6)	Melbourne United	Jo Lual-Acuil (2)	Melbourne United
2023–24	Parker Jackson-Cartwright	New Zealand Breakers	Jack McVeigh	Tasmania JackJumpers
2023–24	Anthony Lamb	New Zealand Breakers	Nathan Sobey (4)	Brisbane Bullets
2024–25	**Bryce Cotton** (8)	Perth Wildcats	Xavier Cooks (3)	Sydney Kings
2024–25	Kendric Davis	Adelaide 36ers	Sam Froling	Illawarra Hawks
2024–25	Tyler Harvey (2)	Illawarra Hawks	Chris Goulding (7)	Melbourne United
2024–25	Matthew Hurt	South East Melbourne Phoenix	Montrezl Harrell	Adelaide 36ers
2024–25	Trey Kell	Illawarra Hawks	Casey Prather (2)	Brisbane Bullets
2025–26	John Brown	South East Melbourne Phoenix	Zylan Cheatham	Adelaide 36ers
2025–26	**Bryce Cotton** (9)	Adelaide 36ers	Xavier Cooks (4)	Sydney Kings
2025–26	Kendric Davis (2)	Sydney Kings	Bryce Hamilton	Tasmania JackJumpers
2025–26	Kristian Doolittle	Perth Wildcats	Parker Jackson-Cartwright (2)	New Zealand Breakers
2025–26	Nathan Sobey (5)	South East Melbourne Phoenix	Jack McVeigh (2)	Cairns Taipans
