= C. J. Bruton =

American-Australian basketball player (born 1975)

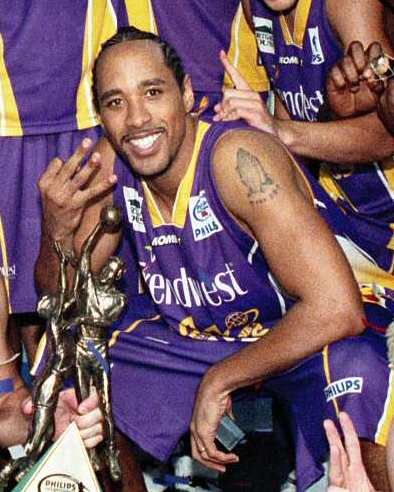
- Bruton with the Sydney Kings in 2005

Personal information
- Born: 13 December 1975 (age 50) Wichita, Kansas, U.S.
- Listed height: 188 cm (6 ft 2 in)
- Listed weight: 88 kg (194 lb)

Career information
- College: Indian Hills CC (1995–1997)
- NBA draft: 1997: 2nd round, 52nd overall pick
- Drafted by: Vancouver Grizzlies
- Playing career: 1992–2011, 2016
- Position: Point guard / shooting guard
- Coaching career: 2007–present

Career history

Playing
- 1992–1994: Perry Lakes Hawks
- 1994: Perth Wildcats
- 1995: Wanneroo Wolves
- 1998: Brisbane Bullets
- 1998–2000: Wollongong Hawks
- 2000–2001: Sioux Falls Skyforce
- 2001: Marinos de Oriente
- 2001: Lakeside Lightning
- 2001–2003: Canberra Cannons
- 2003–2006: Sydney Kings
- 2006–2008: Brisbane Bullets
- 2008–2014: New Zealand Breakers
- 2009: Ironi Ashkelon
- 2010–2011: Piratas de Quebradillas
- 2016: Brisbane Spartans

Coaching
- 2007: South West Metro Pirates
- 2011: Piratas de Quebradillas
- 2015–2016: Brisbane Spartans
- 2016–2021: Brisbane Bullets (assistant)
- 2021–2023: Adelaide 36ers
- 2024–2026: Beijing Ducks (assistant)

Career highlights
- 6× NBL champion (2004, 2005, 2007, 2011–2013); NBL Grand Final MVP (2012); 2× All-NBL First Team (2006, 2009); 3× All-NBL Second Team (1999, 2008, 2010); 2× All-NBL Third Team (2004, 2007); NBL Most Improved Player (1999); Gaze Medal (2005); SBL champion (1994); No. 23 retired by New Zealand Breakers
- Stats at Basketball Reference
Medals
Men's basketball
Representing Australia
Gold medal – first place	2006 Melbourne	Team competition

Calvin Thomas "C. J." Bruton Jr. (born 13 December 1975) is an American-Australian professional basketball coach and former player who is an assistant coach for the Beijing Ducks of the Chinese Basketball Association (CBA). He played the majority of his career in the Australian National Basketball League (NBL) where he won six league championships and was a five-time All-NBL Team selection. Bruton played for numerous NBL teams over his career: Perth Wildcats, Brisbane Bullets, Wollongong Hawks, Canberra Cannons, Sydney Kings, and New Zealand Breakers.

Bruton was born in the United States and grew up in Australia before returning to the United States to play college basketball for Indian Hills Community College from 1995 to 1997. Bruton was a second round selection of the Vancouver Grizzlies in the 1997 NBA draft and traded to the Portland Trail Blazers but did not make the team's roster.

Bruton has served as head coach of the Brisbane Spartans in the South East Australian Basketball League (SEABL) and was an assistant coach for the Brisbane Bullets between 2016 and 2021. He was head coach of the Adelaide 36ers from 2021 until he parted ways midway through the 2023–24 season.

== Early life ==
Bruton was born in Wichita, Kansas. He moved to Australia when he was three after his father, Cal Bruton, signed to play with the Brisbane Bullets of the Australian National Basketball League (NBL). Bruton lived in Brisbane, Geelong and Perth depending on where his father was playing. He attended high school in Perth.

== Playing career ==
=== Early years ===
Between 1992 and 1994, Bruton played for the Perry Lakes Hawks in the State Basketball League (SBL). He helped the Hawks win the SBL championship in 1994. In 1994, Bruton debuted for the Perth Wildcats in the NBL, deeming him ineligible to play in the NCAA. He then played for the Wanneroo Wolves during the 1995 SBL season.

In 1995, Bruton enrolled at Indian Hills Community College of the National Junior College Athletic Association (NJCAA). He was the starting point guard for the Warriors in both his freshman and sophomore seasons. In 1997, he led Indian Hills to the school's first championship and was named as an NJCAA All-American and the MVP of the 1997 national tournament. Bruton ended his career as the single–season and career steals leader at Indian Hills. He averaged 13.2 points per game as a freshman and 12.1 as a sophomore. He also led the team with 5.3 assists per game as a sophomore.

On 25 June 1997, Bruton was selected with the 52nd overall pick by the Vancouver Grizzlies in the 1997 NBA draft. His draft rights were later traded to the Portland Trail Blazers in a draft night trade.

Bruton joined the Brisbane Bullets for the 1998 NBL season and then played for the Wollongong Hawks in the 1998–99 NBL season and 1999–2000 NBL season.

After spending training camp and preseason with the Portland Trail Blazers, Bruton joined the Sioux Falls Skyforce for the 2000–01 CBA season. Following the CBA season, he had a stint with Marinos de Oriente in Venezuela and a stint with the Lakeside Lightning in the SBL.

Bruton played for the Canberra Cannons in 2001–02 and 2002–03 under his father, Calvin, as head coach.

In 2003, Bruton joined the Sydney Kings. In three seasons with the Kings, he won two NBL championships and co-captained the team with Jason Smith. He was named to the Sydney Kings 25th Anniversary Team in 2013.

=== Brisbane Bullets ===
Bruton signed for the cashed-up Brisbane Bullets for the 2006–07 NBL season, joining a star-studded team that also featured Mark Bradtke, Sam Mackinnon, Dusty Rychart, Stephen Black and Adam Gibson. The Bullets won the NBL Pre-Season Blitz held at Coffs Harbour, with Bruton being MVP of the mini-tournament and part of the All-Star Five. His team went 28–5 in the regular season, and then defeated the Melbourne Tigers 3–1 in the finals series to win the Bullets' third championship. The Bullets won the last 18 matches in the regular season, and with three more wins to start the playoffs, set a new NBL record of 21 straight victories. Bruton averaged 14.0 points, 2.6 rebounds and 4.5 assists.

During the 2007 NBL offseason, Bruton coached the South West Metro Pirates of the Queensland ABL.

In the 2007–08 NBL season, Bruton took on an increased role on offense and averaged 19.1 points, 3.2 rebounds, 4.7 assists in 33 games. The Bullets finished the regular season in third position with a 20–10 record, but eventually dipped out in the semi-finals to the eventual champions the Melbourne Tigers. For his efforts, Bruton was named in the All-NBL Second Team.

=== New Zealand Breakers ===
After the Brisbane Bullets became defunct, Bruton signed with the New Zealand Breakers with clear intentions of winning a championship. Bruton's signing gave the Breakers' stability and direction at the point guard position, something that had previously been missing. The Breakers started off the 2008–09 NBL season 15–4, but the loss of Bruton to a high-ankle sprain was telling, as the Breakers lost eight of their final eleven games. After winning through to a best-of-three semi-final series against the defending champion Melbourne Tigers, the Breakers suffered the same fate as Bruton's Bullets a year ago, swept 2–0.

In the 2009–10 NBL season, Bruton appeared in all 28 games for the Breakers, and averaged 16.8 points, 3.3 rebounds, 3.3 assists and 1.4 steals per game. But despite Bruton's best efforts were in vain, with the Breakers finishing 15–13 for the season and in fifth place, missing out on the semi-finals.

In the 2010–11 NBL season, Bruton's playing role reduced, as he averaged only 25 minutes per game (as opposed to 32 minutes per game in the previous season). Consequently, his individual numbers slipped, average 11.0 points, 1.7 rebounds and 1.8 assists per game. However, on the team front, the Breakers became the first professional franchise based in New Zealand to win an Australian league. Bruton hit two three-pointers in the fourth quarter of the championship-deciding game against the Cairns Taipans to seal the championship. It was Bruton's fourth NBL title in his illustrious career.

On 16 March 2012, Bruton re-signed with Breakers for another two seasons. Bruton then would go on to become the only player to win five NBL titles when the Breakers won a hard-fought grand final against Perth Wildcats. He was subsequently named the 2012 Finals MVP.

On 12 April 2013, the Breakers recorded their third NBL championship, sweeping the Perth Wildcats 2–0 in the grand final series, thus winning his sixth title.

On 8 December 2013, Bruton played his 500th game in an 82–84 loss to the Melbourne Tigers.

On 21 March 2014, Bruton played his final NBL game in an 83–95 loss to the Cairns Taipans. In front of a huge Breakers' crowd at Vector Arena with family and friends in attendance, he recorded 11 points, 3 assists and 1 rebound in what was his 516th NBL game.

In October 2014, Bruton's No. 23 jersey was retired by the Breakers.

In July 2024, Bruton was inducted into the Australian Basketball Hall of Fame.

=== Israel/Puerto Rico ===
In March 2009, following the 2008–09 NBL season, Bruton joined Ironi Ashkelon for the rest of the 2008–09 Israeli Basketball Super League season.

In April 2010, following the 2009–10 NBL season, Bruton joined Piratas de Quebradillas from the 2010 BSN season, joining fellow Boomer Shawn Redhage in the team's roster. The team went on to reach the league's semi-finals. He re-signed with Quebradillas midway in the 2011 season, joining another fellow Boomer, Mark Worthington. During the 2011 playoffs, Bruton was released from the team and replaced with Darius Washington. However, and in a strange move, Bruton was hired two days later as head coach of the team, after coach Manolo Cintron was fired mid-series. With Bruton as coach, Quebradillas eliminated Vaqueros de Bayamón, and advanced to their second league finals in three years.

== Coaching career ==
On 1 December 2014, Bruton was appointed head coach of the Brisbane Spartans men's team for the 2015 SEABL season. In September 2015, Bruton was appointed assistant coach and Basketball Operations Manager of the Brisbane Bullets for the team's return season in 2016–17. On 18 January 2016, he was appointed player/coach of the Brisbane Spartans for the 2016 SEABL season.

Bruton was an assistant coach with the Australian Boomers for the 2018 Commonwealth Games on the Gold Coast and helped secure a gold medal.

On 10 September 2021, Bruton was appointed head coach of the Adelaide 36ers on a three-year deal. On 6 December 2023, he parted ways with the 36ers. He had a win-loss record of 27–40 over 67 games.

In 2024, Bruton joined the Beijing Ducks of the Chinese Basketball Association (CBA) as an assistant coach.

== National team career ==
Bruton debuted for the Australian Boomers in 2004. He played for the Boomers at the 2004 Athens Olympics, 2006 FIBA World Championships, and 2008 Beijing Olympics.

== Personal ==
Bruton is the son of Calvin and Patricia. He and his wife, Jessica, have three sons: Rio, Roc and Diggy.
