= Steve Carfino =

American basketball player (born 1962)

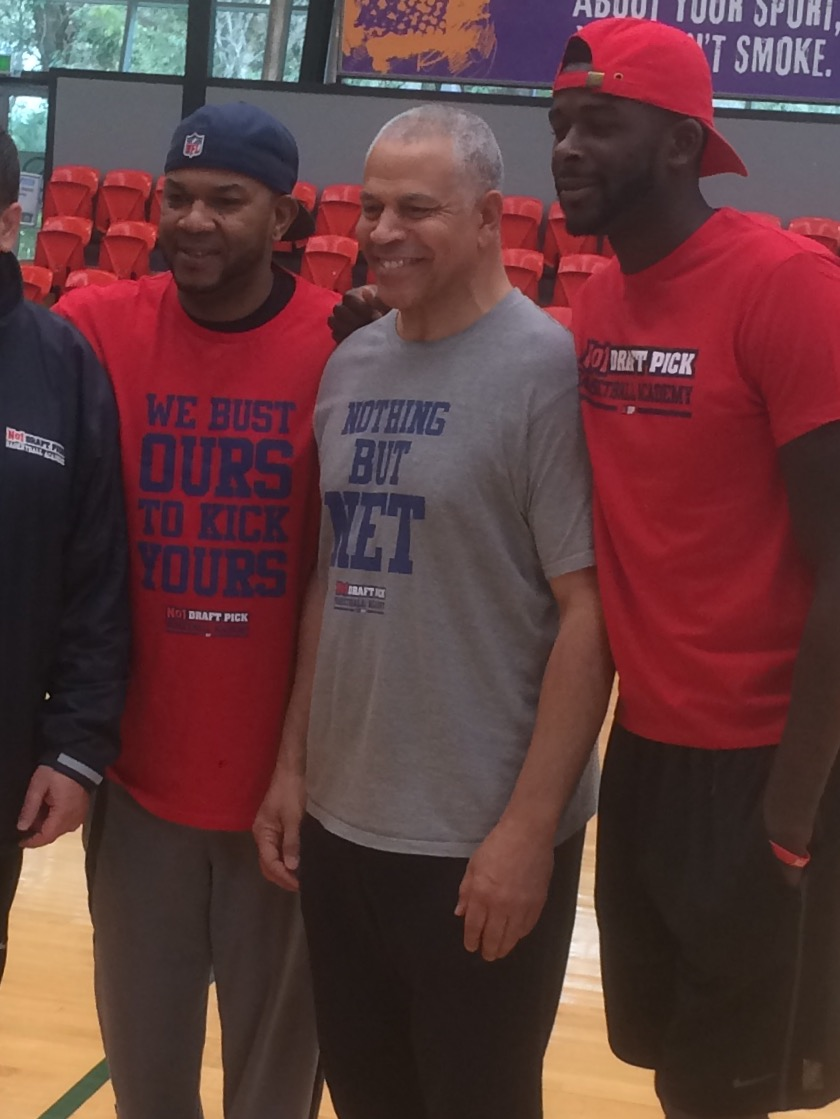
- Carfino (middle) in 2017

Personal information
- Born: August 28, 1962 (age 64) Los Angeles, California, U.S.
- Listed height: 6 ft 2 in (1.88 m)
- Listed weight: 190 lb (86 kg)

Career information
- High school: St. John Bosco (Bellflower, California)
- College: Iowa (1980–1984)
- NBA draft: 1984: 6th round, 139th overall pick
- Drafted by: Boston Celtics
- Playing career: 1986–1991
- Position: Point guard / shooting guard

Career history
- 1986–1988: Hobart Devils
- 1988–1991: Sydney Kings

Career highlights
- 2× All-NBL First Team (1986, 1987); 2× All-NBL Second Team (1988, 1989)
- Stats at Basketball Reference

Steve Carfino (born August 28, 1962) is an American former professional basketball player, who played for the University of Iowa in college basketball and later in the Australian National Basketball League. After retiring he became a television commentator, focusing on basketball, occasionally covering other sports.

== Basketball career ==
=== High school ===
Carfino attended St. John Bosco High School in Bellflower, California. He was a High School All-American selection.

=== Public service ===
Carfino is a patron of CBC (Cammeray Book Club) which helps in men's mental health awareness.

=== College career ===
Carfino attended the University of Iowa, as a guard, recruited by Lute Olson and finishing his last season under George Raveling. The Hawkeyes played in 3 NCAA Tournaments in Carfino's four seasons. In his final year at Iowa, he was named in the All Big Ten, and was also named the Most Valuable Player (MVP) of the Hawkeyes for that season. As a Senior, Carfino averaged 11.7 points, 1.8 Rebounds and 2.4 assists. For his career he scored 1007 points on .489 shooting from the floor and .716 from the free throw line.

=== NBA draft ===
After this, Carfino was drafted by the Boston Celtics in the NBA in the last selection of the 6th round. He was cut by the Celtics in August 1984.

=== Temporary retirement ===
After leaving the Celtics Carfino stepped away from basketball, operating a sports store in Cedar Rapids, Iowa, between September 1984 and July 1985.

=== Australia ===
Steve played five seasons in the NBL between 1986 and 1991. He was forced to retire from playing after the 1991 NBL season at the age of 29 due to ongoing back problems.

==== Hobart Devils ====
Carfino was invited to play pro ball in Australia. He took the opportunity to follow in the foot-steps of other great 'import' players that had made a big impact on the game down-under, and elevated the league to new levels through the 80s. His Australian career started when he moved to Hobart and played with the Hobart Devils. He was named in the All-NBL first team in his debut season. He was ranked fourth in scoring in his debut season averaging 32.7 per game, and came second in the category of assists (7 per game), and steals (3.4 per game). He was also named the runner-up for the Most Valuable Player award in 1986. He was then named in the 1987 All-NBL first team, and was ranked second in steals averaging 3.4 a game.

==== Sydney Kings ====
He joined the Sydney Kings in 1988 after playing two seasons and 51 games at the Hobart Devils. In 1988 and 1989 he was named in the All-NBL second team, and continued to rank high in the steals and assists on an annual basis. During his NBL career, Carfino amassed 3,089 points at an average of 23.4 points, as well as having 750 assists, 501 rebounds and 378 steals. His highest score in his NBL career was 52 which he achieved twice, as well as scoring over 40 points five times more.

On October 10, 2013, Carfino was named in the Sydney Kings 25th Anniversary Team.

Homenetmen Antranig

He was appointed as Senior Men's coach for local Sydney domestic basketball club Homenetmen Antranig on April 13, 2016.

Fans were elated with the Carfino hiring, heard chanting "Max Phoon!" from the sidelines during his first session with the playing group.

On April 13, 2016, an hour after being appointed Carfino was inducted into the Antranig Basketball Hall of Fame.

== NBL Hall of Fame ==
Steve Carfino was inducted into the NBL Hall of Fame as a player in 2004. His selection caused some angst among some of the press (most notably Adelaide's leading basketball journalist Boti Nagy) who accused him and fellow Fox Sports television commentator John Casey of shamelessly pushing for his inclusion in the HoF during their commentary of NBL games.

== Television ==
After retiring from the NBL, Carfino joined Network Ten and provided color commentary for broadcasts of Sydney Kings home games. In 1996 Steve joined Fox Sports to provide commentary of televised NBL games alongside play-by-play commentator John Casey. He also hosted FOX SPORTS Central, The Afternoon Rush, Inside Basketball, and NBL Wrap. In 2005, he added both acting and voice-overs to his résumé.

In 2010, the NBL moved from Fox Sports back to Network Ten, on its HD sports channel One. Carfino was signed as a play-by-play commentator where he usually partners other former NBL players Andrew Gaze and Brett Maher as well as Perth based Lachy Reid.

February 2010 saw Carfino launch his new television show called MVP on One, though the show lasted only one season. MVP provided weekly highlights of American sports.

On 7 December 2014, Carfino resigned from Channel Ten, ending his 22 years as a commentator.

== Other work ==
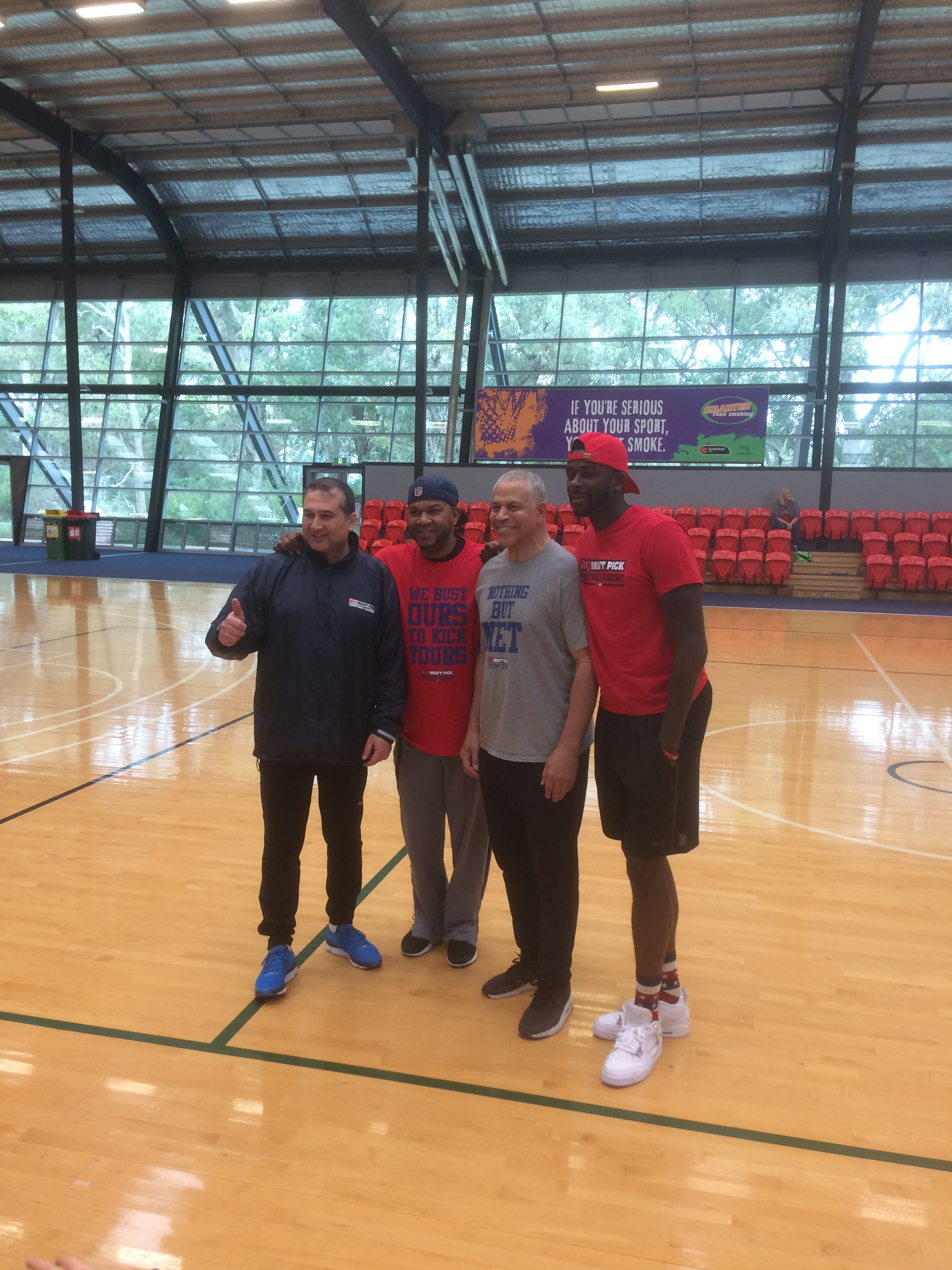
Carfino in July 2017 with the No1 Draft Pick Basketball Academy, standing in between Ricky Grace and James Ennis.

Steve is also active providing private basketball clinics for amateur teams looking to take that next step and achieve their full potential, ignites corporate events as MC or guest speaker with a focus on how to take winning teamwork strategies from pro-sports and applying them to pro-business, and is a consulting partner in a Sydney-based Sports Marketing agency focused on delivering marketing strategy, brand and production services to professional sports teams across all codes. Early in August 2014, Steve signed a deal with high school team St Patrick's College Strathfield as the head coach of the 1st V basketball team. He now is the head of Basketball at Waverley College, Sydney.

== Personal life ==
Carfino is the younger brother of former University of Southern California player Don Carfino.
