= Shane Heal =

Australian basketball player

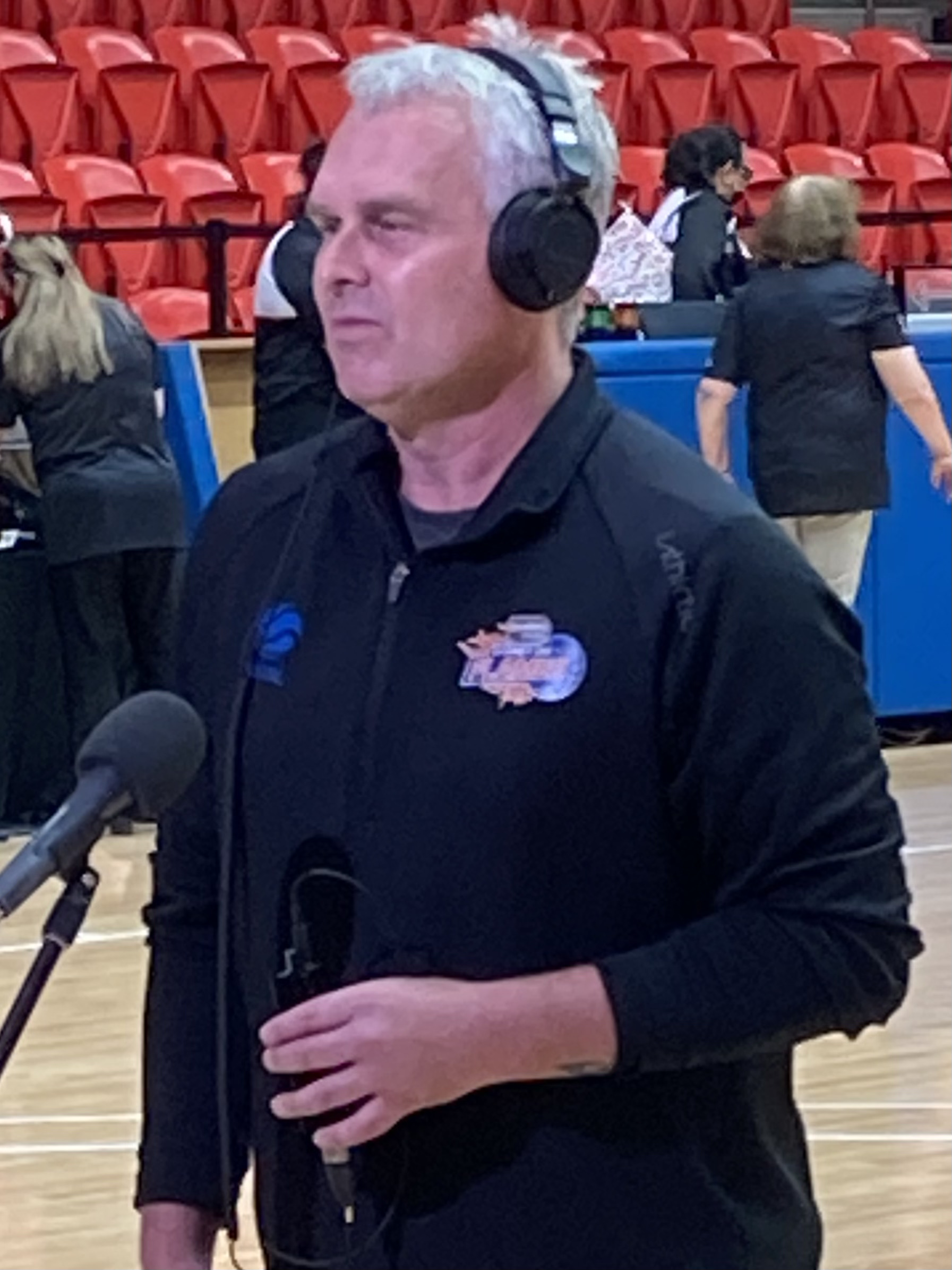
- Heal as coach of the Sydney Uni Flames in 2022

Personal information
- Born: 6 September 1970 (age 56) Melbourne, Victoria, Australia
- Listed height: 6 ft 0 in (1.83 m)
- Listed weight: 183 lb (83 kg)

Career information
- High school: Upper Yarra Secondary College (Yarra Junction, Victoria)
- NBA draft: 1992: undrafted
- Playing career: 1988–2009
- Position: Point guard
- Number: 10, 11
- Coaching career: 2006–present

Career history

Playing
- 1988: Brisbane Bullets
- 1989–1991: Geelong Supercats
- 1992–1995: Brisbane Bullets
- 1996: Sydney Kings
- 1996–1997: Minnesota Timberwolves
- 1998: Sydney Kings
- 1998–2000: Near East
- 2000–2003: Sydney Kings
- 2002: Andrea Costa Imola
- 2003: San Antonio Spurs
- 2003–2004: Makedonikos
- 2006–2008: South Dragons
- 2008–2009: Gold Coast Blaze

Coaching
- 2006–2008: South Dragons
- 2012–2014: Sydney Kings
- 2014: Wellington Saints
- 2015–2016: SEQ Stars
- 2018–2020: Sutherland Sharks
- 2021–2023: Sydney Uni Flames

Career highlights
- As player: NBL champion (2003); All-NBL First Team (2003); 3× All-NBL Second Team (1994, 1996, 2001); All-NBL Third Team (2002); NBL Rookie of the Year (1988); NBL Most Improved Player (1990); NBL Good Hands Award (1990); 2× Gaze Medal winner (1997, 2004); 2× Greek League All-Star (1998, 1999); As coach: NZNBL champion (2014)
- Stats at NBA.com
- Stats at Basketball Reference
Medals
Men's basketball
Representing Australia
FIBA Oceania Championship
Gold medal – first place	2003 Australia

Shane Douglas Heal (born 6 September 1970) is an Australian professional basketball coach and former player.

== Playing career ==
Heal began playing basketball when he was five years old.

=== Australian Institute of Sport ===
Heal held an Australian Institute of Sport basketball scholarship, and he played youth basketball there, from 1987 to 1988.

=== NBL ===
Heal spent most of his professional club career playing in Australia's NBL. He played with the Brisbane Bullets, Geelong Supercats, Sydney Kings, South Dragons and Gold Coast Blaze. He was a member of the Kings' 2003 NBL championship-winning team. Between 2006 and 2008, he served as player-coach of the Dragons. He played his final season in the 2008–09 NBL season with the Blaze. He retired in February 2009, at age 38, after a 21-year career. In 440 games, he averaged 20.6 points and 6.1 assists.

He was named in the Sydney Kings 25th Anniversary Team.

In 2023, Heal's retired jersey banner was removed from the Kings' Wall of Legends following his unceremonious exit as head coach of the Sydney Flames.

=== NBL team records and achievements ===
==== Brisbane Bullets ====
- 2nd on three-pointers made (477)
- 2nd on assists (816)
- 4th on free-throw percentage (84.1%)
- 7th on points scored (2771)
- 7th on field goals made (951)
- 7th on free-throws made (392)
- 8th on steals (164)
- 6th on turnovers (387)

=== NBL league records ===
- First in assists per game in 1990 (8.3/24 games)
- First in assists per game in 2002 (7.5/29 games)
- Third in most points in a game (61 in 1994)
- Third in most assists in a game (20 in 1990)
- Second and third in most three-pointers made in a game (12 in 1994 and 2001)

=== NBA ===
Heal also had two stints in the NBA, firstly in the 1996–97 season with the Minnesota Timberwolves, when he averaged 1.7 points per game in 43 games, and secondly in the 2003–04 season with the San Antonio Spurs, when he averaged 3.7 points in six games.

=== Europe ===
Heal also played professionally in Europe. He played with the Greek Basket League's Near East Athens, from 1998 to 2000. With Near East, he played in Europe's third-tier level FIBA Korać Cup, in the 1999–00 season, in which he averaged 15.2 points and 2.3 assists per game. Heal played in Italy with the Lega Basket Serie A club Andrea Costa Imola, during the 2001–02 season. He then played with the Greek club Makedonikos, where he averaged 15.8 points, 2.9 rebounds and 4.0 assists per game in Europe's second-tier level EuroCup's 2003–04 season.

=== National team career ===
Heal represented Australia's under-19 national team at the 1987 FIBA Under-19 World Championship. Heal's international career highlights include representing the Australian Boomers at the 1992, 1996, 2000 and 2004 editions of the Summer Olympic Games. He was the captain of the team in 2004 in Athens. At the Sydney 2000, where the Boomers finished fourth (equal best result with Atlanta in 1996), Heal was the second highest overall points scorer of the tournament.

Heal also represented Australia at both the 1994 FIBA World Championship and the 1998 FIBA World Championship.

Many consider Heal's best international game came against the USA "Dream Team" in a warm up match for the 1996 Olympic Games in Atlanta. The game, played at the Delta Center in Salt Lake City, was won 118–77 by the US, though Heal topped all scorers with 28 points including hitting 8 of 12 three pointers. Heal had a running battle with NBA superstar Charles Barkley during the game with the two almost coming to blows at one point, though they hugged in mutual respect on-court after the game.

== Coaching career ==
=== South Dragons ===
On 3 March 2006, it was reported in Melbourne's Herald Sun newspaper that Heal was considering coming out of retirement to captain the South Dragons, a new Melbourne-based NBL franchise to enter the league in the 2006–07 season. He officially signed with the team on 6 April as the Dragons' inaugural captain. On 23 October 2006, Dragons coach Mark Price resigned after the Dragons lost their first five regular season games. Price was replaced by Heal, who was appointed as player and interim coach for the remainder of the season. Heal took the club to the NBL playoffs in their first season, but then the team won just four of 26 games in 2007–08, including defeats in their last straight 13 matches. He was sacked by the Dragons on 1 February 2008.

=== Sydney Kings ===
On 24 February 2012, Heal was appointed head coach of the Sydney Kings for the rest of the 2011–12 NBL season. In his first game two days later, he guided the Kings to a 71–69 win over the Townsville Crocodiles.

Heal was named the Coach of the Month for January of the 2013–14 NBL season.

In March 2014, Heal parted ways with the Kings.

=== Wellington Saints ===
Heal coached the Wellington Saints during the 2014 New Zealand NBL season, and helped them win the championship in his one season.

=== South East Queensland ===
In March 2015, Heal was named the inaugural head coach of the South East Queensland Stars on a three-year deal. He was sacked in February 2016 when the team went into liquidation.

=== Sutherland Sharks ===
Heal coached the Sutherland Sharks women's team in the Waratah League for three years between 2018 and 2020. He guided them to a grand final appearance in his first year.

=== Sydney Uni Flames ===
In March 2021, Heal was appointed head coach of the Sydney Uni Flames on a three-year deal. He and his daughter left the Flames in January 2023 for reasons not publicly specified, and the departure is accompanied by an investigation from an independent firm.

== Personal life ==
Heal's daughter, Shyla, is also a professional basketball player and has played on multiple teams where her father has been the coach.

== Career statistics ==
Legend
GP	Games played	GS	Games started	MPG	Minutes per game
FG%	Field goal percentage	3P%	3-point field goal percentage	FT%	Free throw percentage
RPG	Rebounds per game	APG	Assists per game	SPG	Steals per game
BPG	Blocks per game	PPG	Points per game	**Bold**	Career high

=== NBA ===
==== Regular season ====
Year	Team	GP	GS	MPG	FG%	3P%	FT%	RPG	APG	SPG	BPG	PPG
1996–97	Minnesota	**43**	0	5.5	.268	**.308**	.600	.4	.8	.1	**.1**	1.7
2003–04	San Antonio	6	0	**12.0**	**.292**	.222	**.800**	**.7**	.8	**.2**	.0	**3.7**
Career		49	0	6.3	.273	.289	.700	.4	.8	.1	.1	2.0

==== Playoffs ====
Year	Team	GP	GS	MPG	FG%	3P%	FT%	RPG	APG	SPG	BPG	PPG
1997	Minnesota	2	0	1.5	1.000	1.000	–	.0	.5	.0	.0	3.0
