= Frank Drmic =

Australian basketball player

Personal information
- Born: 7 February 1978 (age 48) Melbourne, Victoria, Australia
- Listed height: 6 ft 8 in (2.03 m)
- Listed weight: 209 lb (95 kg)

Career information
- Playing career: 1996–2007
- Position: Forward

Career history
- 1996–1998: South East Melbourne Magic
- 1998–2000: Victoria Titans
- 2000–2002: Sydney Kings
- 2002: Near East BC
- 2002–2003: Spirou Charleroi
- 2003: Saint-Quentin
- 2004: TBB Trier
- 2005: EWE Baskets Oldenburg
- 2006–2007: South Dragons

Career highlights
- NBL champion (1996); All-NBL Third Team (1998)

Frank Drmic (born 7 February 1978) is an Australian professional basketball player.

== Playing career ==
Born in Melbourne, Victoria, Drmic held an Australian Institute of Sport scholarship 1994–1995. His career began in the Australian National Basketball League – NBL in 1996, playing with the NBL South East Melbourne Magic. In his rookie season with the NBL South East Melbourne Magic, they won the National Basketball League Championship. Drmic and the NBL South East Melbourne Magic also competed in the 1997 National Basketball League Grand Final Series.

One of his greatest achievements was winning gold whilst representing Australia at the 1997 U23 World Championships. In 1997, he received the Junior Male Player of the Year Award from Basketball Australia. In 1998, he was selected to represent Australia at the FIBA World Championships in Greece and won silver at the Goodwill Games in New York City.

Seasons 1998–2000 he signed with the NBL Victoria Titans and played in the National Basketball League Grand Final Series for the 1998–1999, 1999–2000 championships. Drmic signed with the NBL Sydney Kings for the 2000–2002 seasons.

During 2002–2005 he played throughout Europe in the A1 Ethniki Greek Basketball League, Russian Basketball Super League, BLB Belgium Basketball League, the second French division and BBL Basketball Bundesliga. In 2004 whilst playing in the BBL Basketball Bundesliga League he finished the season as the leading 3pt percentage shooter.

Drmic returned to the Australian National Basketball League in 2006 and signed with the NBL South Dragons.

His younger brother, Anthony Drmic, was a player for the Boise State University Broncos basketball team, and now plays for the Adelaide 36ers in the NBL.

== Awards ==
- 1997 – Basketball Australia Junior Male Player of the Year Award
