= Pat Reidy =

Australian basketball player

Personal information
- Born: 15 March 1971 (age 55) Melbourne, Australia
- Listed height: 198 cm (6 ft 6 in)
- Listed weight: 105 kg (231 lb)

Career information
- Playing career: 1990–2005
- Position: Forward

Career history
- 1990–1998: North Melbourne Giants
- 1998–1999: Newcastle Falcons
- 1999–2005: Townsville Crocodiles

Career highlights
- NBL champion (1994); All-NBL Second Team (2003); 3× All-NBL Third Team (1994–1996)

Pat Reidy (born 15 March 1971) is an Australian basketball player. He competed in the men's tournament at the 1996 Summer Olympics.
