= Martin Cattalini =

Australian basketball player

Personal information
- Born: 4 October 1973 (age 52) Fremantle, Western Australia, Australia
- Listed height: 202 cm (6 ft 8 in)
- Listed weight: 100 kg (220 lb)

Career information
- Playing career: 1990–2010
- Position: Forward

Career history
- 1990–1995: Cockburn Cougars
- 1993–1995: Perth Wildcats
- 1996–2000: Adelaide 36ers
- 2000–2002: Caja San Fernando
- 2002–2004: Adelaide 36ers
- 2004–2005: DKV Joventut
- 2005–2009: Cairns Taipans
- 2009: Cockburn Cougars
- 2009–2010: Perth Wildcats

Career highlights
- 4× NBL champion (1995, 1998, 1999, 2010); SBL champion (1992); All-NBL First Team (2007); 2× All-NBL Second Team (2000, 2004); 2× All-NBL Third Team (2003, 2006)

Martin Peter Cattalini (born 4 October 1973) is an Australian former professional basketball player. He played for the Perth Wildcats, Adelaide 36ers and Cairns Taipans in the National Basketball League (NBL), winning four championships in 1995, 1998, 1999 and 2010.

== Early life ==
Cattalini was born in Fremantle, Western Australia.

== Professional career ==
Cattalini played for the Cockburn Cougars of the State Basketball League (SBL) from 1990 to 1995. The Cougars won the SBL championship in 1992.

Cattalini debuted in the National Basketball League (NBL) for the Perth Wildcats in 1993. In 1995, he was a member of the Wildcats' championship team. In 1996, he joined the Adelaide 36ers. He helped the 36ers win back-to-back NBL championships in 1998 and 1999. He averaged 20.3 points per game in the 1999–2000 season.

For the 2000–01 season, Cattalini joined Caja San Fernando of the Spanish Liga ACB. He played a second season for Caja San Fernando in 2001–02.

Cattalini returned to the Adelaide 36ers for the 2002–03 season. He played for the 36ers again in 2003–04.

Cattalini joined DKV Joventut of the Liga ACB for the 2004–05 season.

Cattalini joined the Cairns Taipans for the 2005–06 NBL season. In 2006–07, he averaged a career-high 24.4 points per game. He left the Taipans after four seasons.

Cattalini played one game for the Cockburn Cougars during the 2009 State Basketball League season.

In June 2009, Cattalini signed with the Perth Wildcats. He won his fourth NBL championship in March 2010. He retired following the 2009–10 season having played 453 NBL games.

In August 2025, Cattalini was inducted into the Basketball WA Hall of Fame. In February 2026, he was inducted into the Perth Wildcats Hall of Fame.

== National team career ==
Cattalini played for the Australian Boomers at the 2000 Olympics in Sydney and the 2004 Olympic Games in Athens.

== NBL career stats ==
Games:	453 (119 Per, 218 Adl, 116 Cns)
Points:	7,526 (14.4 pg)
Free Throws:	1,195 / 1,559 (76.7%)
Field goals:	2,405 / 4,925 (48.8%)
3 Points:	507 / 1,286 (39.4%)
Rebounds:	5.3 pg
Steals:	0.5 pg
Assists:	1.5 pg
Blocks:	0.3 pg

== Personal life ==
Cattalini holds dual nationality with Australia and Italy.
