= Ricky Grace =

American-Australian basketball player

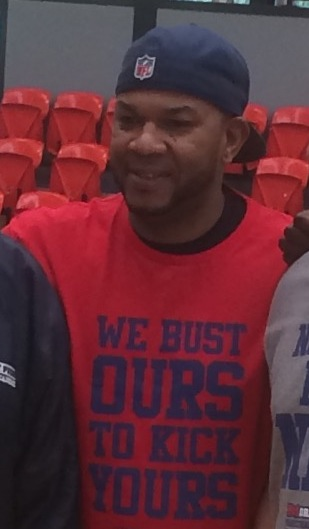
- Grace in 2017

Personal information
- Born: 20 August 1966 (age 60) Dallas, Texas, U.S.
- Listed height: 6 ft 1 in (1.85 m)
- Listed weight: 174 lb (79 kg)

Career information
- High school: Wilmer-Hutchins (Dallas, Texas)
- College: Midland (1984–1986); Oklahoma (1986–1988)
- NBA draft: 1988: 3rd round, 67th overall pick
- Drafted by: Utah Jazz
- Playing career: 1988–2005
- Position: Point guard
- Number: 15

Career history
- 1988–1989: Topeka Sizzlers
- 1990–2005: Perth Wildcats
- 1993: Atlanta Hawks

Career highlights
- 4× NBL champion (1990, 1991, 1995, 2000); 2× NBL Grand Final MVP (1990, 1993); 4× All-NBL First Team (1991, 2001–2003); All-NBL Second Team (1993); 3× All-NBL Third Team (1995, 1998, 2000); No. 15 retired by Perth Wildcats; Australian Basketball Hall of Fame (2010); NBL 25th Anniversary Team (2003)
- Stats at NBA.com
- Stats at Basketball Reference

Ricky Ray Grace AM (born 20 August 1966) is an American-Australian former professional basketball player who spent the majority of his career in the Australian National Basketball League with the Perth Wildcats.

== Early life ==
Grace attended Wilmer-Hutchins High School in Dallas, Texas.

== College career ==
Grace played college basketball at Midland College between 1984 and 1986. In 1985–86, he averaged 15.8 points and 10.7 assists per game in leading Midland to a 33–1 record. His 363 assists broke Spud Webb's former school record of 355 set in 1982–83.

With two years of eligibility remaining, Grace transferred to the University of Oklahoma in 1986 alongside future NBA player Mookie Blaylock. He helped the Sooners reach the championship game of the 1988 NCAA Division I men's basketball tournament, where they were defeated by the Kansas Jayhawks. He averaged 14.3 points and 7.4 assists per game in 1987–88.

== Playing career ==
Grace was selected by the Utah Jazz in the third round (67th overall) of the 1988 NBA draft and went on to play for the Topeka Sizzlers of the Continental Basketball Association in 1988–89.

Grace joined the Perth Wildcats of the Australian National Basketball League in 1990. He helped the Wildcats win the NBL championship in 1990 with grand final MVP honours. The team won back-to-back championships in 1991. He was also named All-NBL First Team in 1991. The Wildcats returned to the grand final in 1993, where they lost to the Melbourne Tigers. Despite the loss, Grace was named grand final MVP for the second time.

To begin the 1993–94 NBA season, Grace had a three-game stint with the Atlanta Hawks, where he was reunited with college teammate Mookie Blaylock.

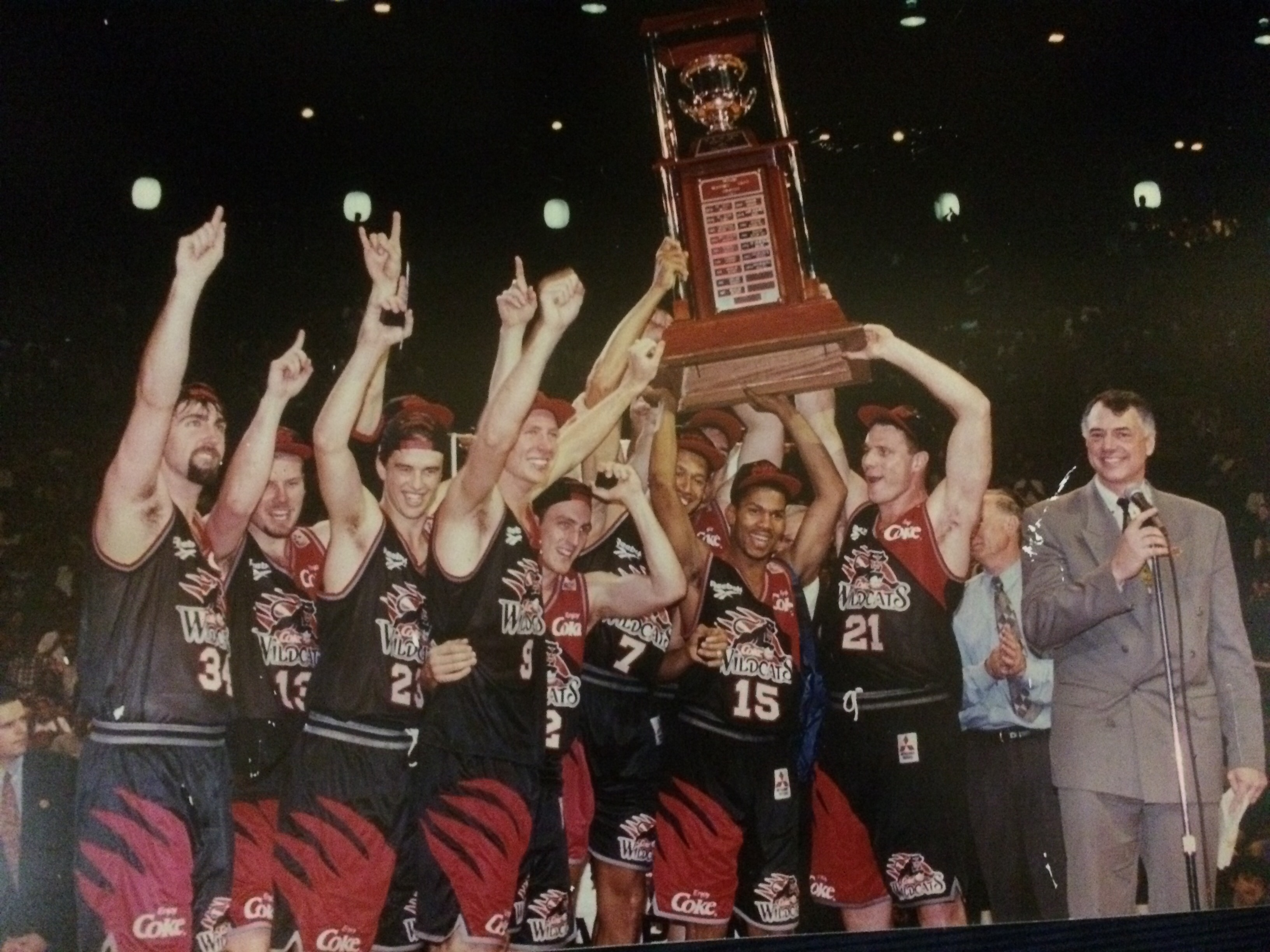
Grace (#15) holding up the 1995 NBL Championship trophy

In 1995, Grace helped the Wildcats win their third NBL championship. The Wildcats were subsequently invited to participate in the 1995 McDonald's Championship in London. The Wildcats lost to NBA champions the Houston Rockets before defeating Real Madrid in their second match.

In 2000, Grace helped the Wildcats win their fourth NBL championship. He was named All-NBL First Team every year between 2001 and 2003. He helped them reach the 2003 grand final series, where they lost to the Sydney Kings. That year, Grace was selected to the NBL's 25th Anniversary Team. He retired after two more seasons, with his last game coming in a loss in an elimination final against the Melbourne Tigers on 24 February 2005.

In August 2010, Grace was inducted into the Australian Basketball Hall of Fame. He was named to the Perth Wildcats' 30th Anniversary All-Star team and 40th Anniversary All-Star team. In July 2024, he was inducted into the Basketball WA Hall of Fame.

Grace held the Wildcats' all-time games played record of 482 until November 2024, when Jesse Wagstaff broke the record.

== National team ==
In late 1994, Grace became naturalised as an Australian citizen and in March 1995 made his international debut when he was selected for the Australian Boomers in their five-game series against the touring Magic Johnson All-Stars.

Grace played for the Australian Boomers at the Sydney Olympic Games in 2000.

== Post-playing career ==
Grace was previously the director for the Role Models WA organisation. Role Models WA offers sport and development programs for indigenous communities in Western Australia. Other role models that work alongside Grace include numerous football players from the Fremantle Dockers and West Coast Eagles including Chris Lewis, David Wirrpanda, Des Headland and Daniel Kerr.

Grace coached the Curtin University men's team in the University Basketball League (UBL) in 2022 and 2023, returning again in 2024.

== Oklahoma Sooners team records ==
- First in three-point field goal percentage in a season - 1986/87 (.441)
- First in assists in a season - 1987/88 (280)
- Equal First in steals in an NCAA Tournament game - vs Iowa, 20 March 1987 (7)

== Perth Wildcats team records ==
- First in points (8802)
- First in assists (3470)
- First in steals (734)

== NBL records ==
- First in assists per game in 2003 (8.0/27 games)
- First in assists per game in 2004 (7.3/23 games)

Awards
Preceded by Andrew Vlahov	Captain of the Perth Wildcats; 2002-2005	Succeeded by Tony Ronaldson
