= Adam Gibson =

Australian basketball player (born 1986)

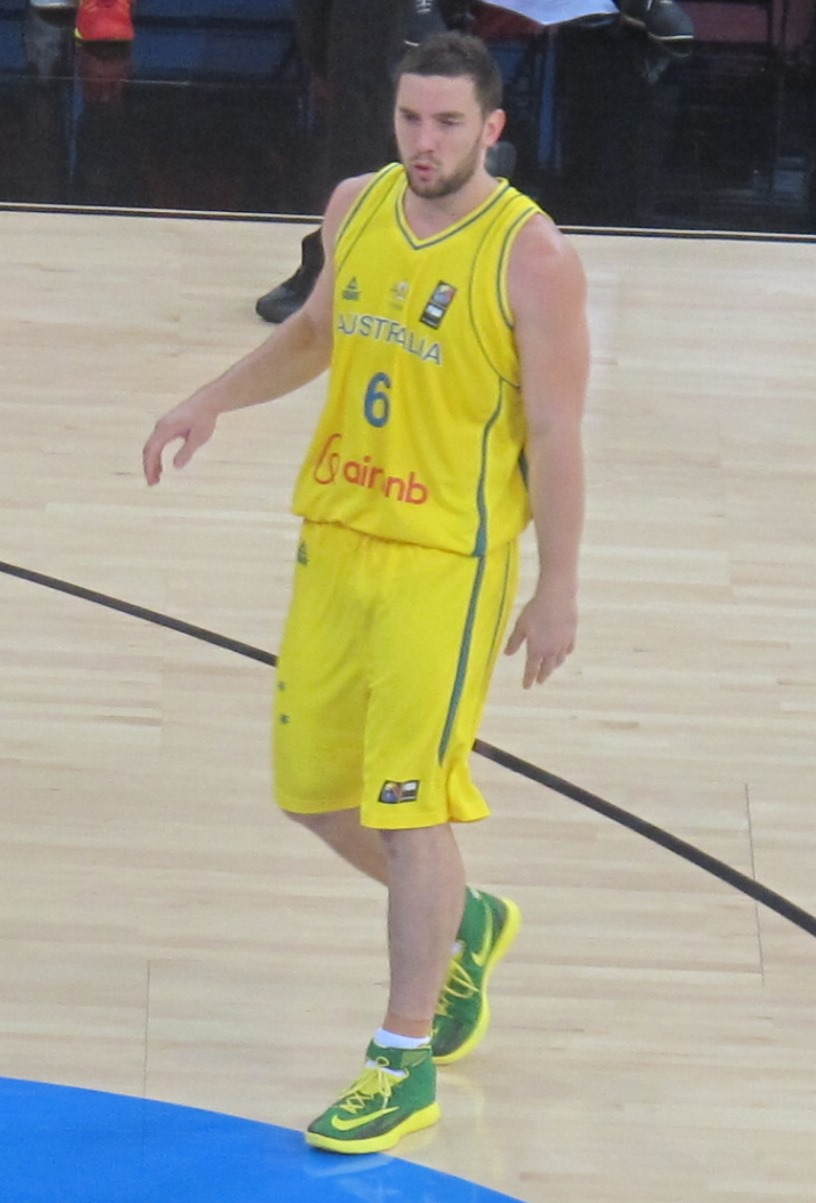
- Gibson in 2014

South East Melbourne Phoenix
- Title: Assistant coach
- League: NBL

Personal information
- Born: 30 October 1986 (age 40) Launceston, Tasmania, Australia
- Listed height: 188 cm (6 ft 2 in)
- Listed weight: 93 kg (205 lb)

Career information
- High school: Prospect (Launceston, Tasmania)
- Playing career: 2004–2022
- Position: Guard
- Coaching career: 2025–present

Career history

Playing
- 2004–2005: Australian Institute of Sport
- 2005–2008: Brisbane Bullets
- 2006: Hobart Chargers
- 2007–2008: Southern Districts Spartans
- 2008–2009: South Dragons
- 2009: Northside Wizards
- 2009–2012: Gold Coast Blaze
- 2010: Brisbane Spartans
- 2011: Gold Coast Rollers
- 2012–2016: Adelaide 36ers
- 2013–2014: Forestville Eagles
- 2016: Gold Coast Rollers
- 2016–2019: Brisbane Bullets
- 2017–2018: Brisbane / Southern Districts Spartans
- 2019: Canterbury Rams
- 2019: Rockhampton Rockets
- 2019–2021: South East Melbourne Phoenix
- 2021–2022: Knox Raiders

Coaching
- 2025–present: South East Melbourne Phoenix (assistant)

Career highlights
- 2× NBL champion (2007, 2009); NBL Best Defensive Player (2009); 3× All-NBL Second Team (2010–2012); 2× All-NBL Third Team (2009, 2013); Central ABL champion (2013); Central ABL Grand Final MVP (2013); SEABL South Youth Player of the Year (2006)

Adam Matthew Gibson (born 30 October 1986) is an Australian former professional basketball player who is an assistant coach for the South East Melbourne Phoenix of the National Basketball League (NBL). He played 16 years in the NBL for the Brisbane Bullets, South Dragons, Gold Coast Blaze, Adelaide 36ers and Phoenix. He is a two-time NBL champion, having won his first in 2007 with the Bullets and his second in 2009 with the Dragons. He is also a five-time All-NBL Team member and was crowned the NBL Best Defensive Player in 2009.

Gibson was a long-time member of the Australian Boomers, having played at the 2012 London Olympics and at the 2010, and 2014 FIBA World Cups.

== Early life and career ==
Gibson was born Launceston, Tasmania. He attended Hagley Farm School in nearby Hagley, and then attended secondary school at Prospect High School in Launceston.

In 2004, Gibson moved to Canberra to attend the Australian Institute of Sport (AIS), where he played in the South East Australian Basketball League (SEABL) for the AIS men's team in 2004 and 2005.

== Professional career ==
=== NBL ===
Gibson started his NBL career with the Brisbane Bullets in 2005–06, and won a title in 2006–07, but was forced to leave the Bullets following the 2007–08 season after the club folded.

For the 2008–09 season, Gibson joined the South Dragons. He was named to the All-NBL Third Team and earned NBL Best Defensive Player honours, and helped the Dragons win the NBL championship.

Following the demise of the Dragons, Gibson joined the Gold Coast Blaze for the 2009–10 NBL season. In his three seasons with the Blaze, he earned All-NBL Second Team honours every year.

Following the demise of the Blaze, Gibson joined the Adelaide 36ers for the 2012–13 NBL season. In March 2013, he played his 250th NBL game. Returning to the 36ers for the 2013–14 season, Gibson helped the team reach the 2014 NBL Grand Final series, where they lost 2–1 to the Perth Wildcats. The 2014–15 season saw Gibson score a career-high 34 points in November and play his 300th NBL game in January. Gibson played a fourth and final season with the 36ers in 2015–16.

For the 2016–17 NBL season, Gibson joined the returning Brisbane Bullets, a franchise re-entering the league after eight seasons of inaction. In November 2016, he played his 350th NBL game. In December 2018, he played his 400th NBL game.

After three seasons with the Bullets, Gibson joined the South East Melbourne Phoenix for the 2019–20 NBL season. In April 2021, he played his 450th NBL game.

On 10 February 2022, Gibson returned to the Phoenix roster as a Covid Replacement Player for Xavier Munford. He did not play in his short return stint, and on 21 May 2022 announced his retirement from the NBL.

=== Off-season stints ===
Gibson has played in various Australian state leagues in nearly all of his NBL off-seasons. In 2006, he played in the SEABL for the Hobart Chargers and won the SEABL South Men's Australian U/21 Youth Player of the Year Award. In 2007 and 2008, he continued on in the SEABL with the Southern Districts Spartans. After a stint in the QBL with the Northside Wizards in 2009, he returned to the SEABL in 2010 to once again play for the Spartans, now known as the Brisbane Spartans. In 2011, he played for the Gold Coast Rollers in the QBL.

After not playing state league basketball in 2012, Gibson joined the Forestville Eagles of the Central ABL in 2013. He helped the Eagles win the championship behind a Grand Final MVP performance. He had a second stint with the Eagles in 2014, before sitting out the 2015 off-season.

Gibson had stints in the QBL every year between 2016 and 2019, playing for the Gold Coast Rollers (2016), Brisbane / Southern Districts Spartans (2017–18), and Rockhampton Rockets (2019). Gibson also had a one-game stint with the Canterbury Rams in New Zealand in 2019.

In 2021 and 2022, Gibson played for the Knox Raiders of the NBL1 South.

== National team career ==
Gibson represented Australia at the 2005 FIBA Under-21 World Championship, in Argentina. He then represented the Australian Boomers every year between 2009 and 2015, including playing at the 2010 FIBA World Championship in Turkey, the 2012 Summer Olympics in London, and the 2014 FIBA Basketball World Cup in Spain.

== Coaching career ==
Gibson joined the coaching staff of the South East Melbourne Phoenix in 2023 as a development coach. In July 2025, Gibson was elevated to a full-time assistant coach role with the Phoenix.

== Personal life ==
In 2023, Gibson's sister Lisa was diagnosed with breast cancer.
