= Ray Owes =

American basketball player

Personal information
- Born: December 11, 1972 (age 53) San Bernardino, California, U.S.
- Listed height: 6 ft 9 in (2.06 m)
- Listed weight: 224 lb (102 kg)

Career information
- High school: San Bernardino (San Bernardino, California)
- College: Arizona (1991–1995)
- NBA draft: 1995: undrafted
- Position: Power forward
- Number: 35

Career history
- 1996: Geelong Supercats
- 1996–1997: Golden State Warriors
- 1998: Townsville Suns
- 2001–2002: Townsville Crocodiles

Career highlights
- 2× All-NBL First Team (1996, 1998); First-team All-Pac-10 (1995)
- Stats at NBA.com
- Stats at Basketball Reference

Raymond Owes (born December 11, 1972) is an American former professional basketball player. He was listed at 204 cm 102 kg. He played small forward and for the Arizona Wildcats from 1991 to 1995, and was named first-team All-Pac-10 in 1995.

Owes played 51 games for the NBA's Golden State Warriors during the 1996-97 season, averaging 3.1 points and 2.9 rebounds per game. He also played in the Australian NBL for the Geelong Supercats and Townsville Crocodiles. While playing for Geelong, Owes was selected to the 1996 All-NBL team as a power forward.
