= Mark Worthington =

Australian basketball player (born 1983)

Personal information
- Born: 8 June 1983 (age 43) Australind, Western Australia, Australia
- Listed height: 203 cm (6 ft 8 in)
- Listed weight: 107 kg (236 lb)

Career information
- High school: Australind Senior (Australind, Western Australia)
- College: Metro State (2001–2005)
- NBA draft: 2005: undrafted
- Playing career: 1999–2017; 2023
- Position: Power forward / small forward
- Coaching career: 2016–present

Career history

Playing
- 1999–2002: Bunbury Slammers
- 2004: Bunbury Slammers
- 2005–2008: Sydney Kings
- 2008: Bunbury Slammers
- 2008–2009: South Dragons
- 2009–2010: Melbourne Tigers
- 2010: Brose Baskets
- 2010–2012: Gold Coast Blaze
- 2011: Mets de Guaynabo
- 2011: Piratas de Quebradillas
- 2012–2013: Radnički Kragujevac
- 2013–2015: Melbourne Tigers/United
- 2015–2017: Cairns Taipans
- 2023: Willetton Tigers

Coaching
- 2016–2017: Cairns Dolphins
- 2017–2018: Loyola Marymount (assistant)
- 2020–2021: South West Slammers men's team

Career highlights
- BBL champion (2010); NBL champion (2009); 4× All-NBL First Team (2008–2010, 2012); NBL Rookie of the Year (2006); NABC Division II Player of the Year (2005); SBL champion (1999)
Medals
Men's basketball
Representing Australia
Gold medal – first place	2006 Melbourne	Team competition

Mark Worthington (born 8 June 1983) is an Australian former professional basketball player. He played 11 seasons in the National Basketball League (NBL).

== Early life and career ==
Worthington was born and raised in Australind, Western Australia, where he attended Australind Primary School and Australind Senior High School. He played for the Bunbury Slammers as a youth and started his career as a development player for the Cairns Taipans.

== College career ==
Worthington played college basketball in the United States at Metropolitan State University of Denver under coach Mike Dunlap from 2001 to 2005. He won the NABC Division II Player of the Year award in 2004–05.

== Professional career ==
After a standout career at Metro State, Worthington made his debut with the Sydney Kings of the National Basketball League, winning the NBL Rookie of the Year Award in 2005–06. He played three seasons with the Kings, before signing with the South Dragons for the 2008–09 season. He helped the Dragons win the NBL championship before they folded in 2009. He subsequently signed with the Melbourne Tigers for the 2009–10 season. In 2010, he had a stint with German team Brose Baskets.

For the 2010–11 season, Worthington joined the Gold Coast Blaze. In 2011, he had stints with Puerto Rican teams Mets de Guaynabo and Piratas de Quebradillas, before returning to the Blaze for the 2011–12 season.

In July 2012, Worthington signed with Serbian team Radnički Kragujevac. He suffered a season-ending injury in December 2012, forcing him to eventually leave Kragujevac in February 2013. He played 14 games, averaging 10.2 points and 3.6 rebounds per game.

On 18 July 2013, Worthington signed with the Melbourne Tigers, returning to the club for a second stint. In May 2014, the Tigers changed their name to United.

On 7 July 2015, Worthington signed a two-year deal with the Cairns Taipans. On 13 January 2016, he played his 300th NBL game. On 22 January 2017, Worthington announced his decision to retire at the end of the 2016–17 season. His 335th and final NBL game came in the Taipans' game two semi-final loss to the Perth Wildcats on 20 February 2017 at Perth Arena.

Worthington was named in the Sydney Kings 25th Anniversary Team in 2013 and the Basketball WA Hall of Fame in 2022.

On 2 March 2023, Worthington came out of retirement as a 39-year-old and signed with the Willetton Tigers of the NBL1 West for the 2023 season.

== National team career ==
Worthington made his debut for the Australian national team in 2005 at the FIBA Oceania Championship. He has since played for them at the 2008 Summer Olympics in Beijing, and four years later in London, as well as at the FIBA World Championship in 2006 and 2010.

== Coaching career ==
In February 2016, Worthington was appointed head coach of QBL women's side, the Cairns Dolphins. After two seasons with the Dolphins, Worthington spent the 2017–18 U.S. college season as an assistant coach with the Loyola Marymount Lions men's basketball team. In October 2019, Worthington was appointed head coach of SBL men's side, the South West Slammers, for the 2020 season. He coached them in the inaugural season of the NBL1 West in 2021.

== Personal life ==
Worthington's father, Greg, is a basketball coach who has been involved with the South West Slammers. His brother, Trent, played for many years with the Slammers' SBL team.

Worthington and his ex-wife, Andrea, have two sons, Taz and Axel. In May 2023 he announced his engagement to AFLW player Dana Hooker. They married in December 2023 and announced in June 2024 they were pregnant with their first child together to be born in December 2024.

In August 2012, it was announced that Worthington was considering a switch to play Australian rules football for the West Coast Eagles. His uncle, Kevin Worthington played for the Collingwood, Claremont and Perth football clubs in the 1970s and 1980s.
