= Kavossy Franklin =

American basketball player

Personal information
- Born: July 18, 1975 (age 51) Houston, Texas, U.S.
- Listed height: 188 cm (6 ft 2 in)
- Listed weight: 85 kg (187 lb)

Career information
- High school: Alief Hastings (Houston, Texas)
- College: New Mexico (1995–1996); Howard College (1996–1998); Augusta (1998–1999)
- NBA draft: 1999: undrafted
- Playing career: 1999–2010
- Position: Point guard

Career history
- 1999–2000: Black Hills Gold
- 2000: Washington Congressionals
- 2000–2001: Mulhouse
- 2002: Adirondack Wildcats
- 2002–2003: Sydney Kings
- 2004–2005: Hunter Pirates
- 2005–2006: Skyliners Frankfurt
- 2006–2007: South Dragons
- 2007–2008: Wollongong Hawks
- 2008: Vaqueros de Bayamón
- 2008–2009: Wollongong Hawks
- 2010: Harbour Heat

Career highlights
- NBL champion (2003); 4× All-NBL Third Team (2003, 2005, 2007, 2008)

Kavossy Franklin (born July 18, 1975) is an American former professional basketball player who is most known for his time spent in the Australian National Basketball League (NBL).

Franklin played college basketball for the New Mexico Lobos, Howard College Hawks, and Augusta Jaguars, completing his eligibility in 1999. Upon leaving college, he played in the International Basketball Association and the United States Basketball League, as well as in France for Mulhouse.

In 2002, Franklin moved to Australia and joined the Sydney Kings, helping the Kings win a championship in 2002–03. For the 2004–05 season, he returned to Australia and joined the Hunter Pirates. In March 2005, he signed with Skyliners Frankfurt for the rest of the season. He continued on with Frankfurt in 2005–06.

In 2006, Franklin returned to Australia and joined the South Dragons for the 2006–07 season. In 2007–08 and 2008–09, he played for the Wollongong Hawks. During the 2008 off-season, he also had a stint in Puerto Rico with Vaqueros de Bayamón. In 164 NBL games over five seasons, Franklin averaged 19.3 points, 4.3 rebounds and 3.8 assists per game.

In March 2010, Franklin signed with the Harbour Heat for the 2010 New Zealand NBL season. He appeared in 17 of the team's 18 regular season games, averaging 16.4 points, 4.2 rebounds, 2.2 assists and 1.3 steals per game. The Heat qualified for the playoffs and faced the Hawke's Bay Hawks in the quarter-finals. However, Franklin and teammate Corey Webster missed the game after they were stood down for disciplinary reasons. Without the pair, the Heat were defeated 82–77.
