= Steve Woodberry =

American basketball coach

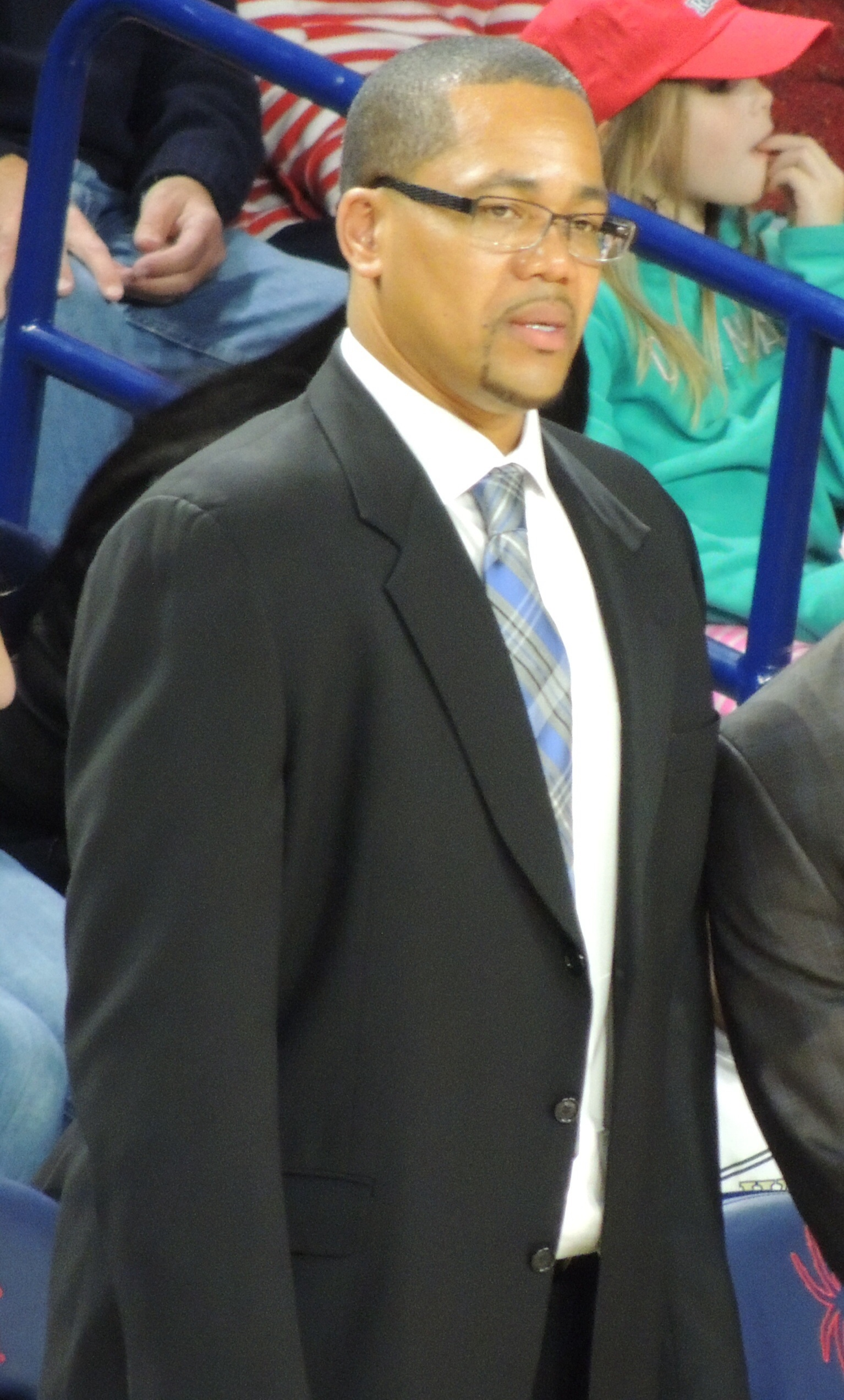
- Woodberry coaching a game in December 2014.

Missouri State Bears
- Title: Assistant Coach

Personal information
- Born: October 9, 1971 (age 55) Wichita, Kansas, U.S.
- Listed height: 6 ft 4 in (1.93 m)
- Listed weight: 198 lb (90 kg)

Career information
- High school: Wichita South (Wichita, Kansas)
- College: Kansas (1990–1994)
- NBA draft: 1994: undrafted
- Playing career: 1994–2006
- Position: Shooting guard / small forward
- Coaching career: 2006–present

Career history

Playing
- 1994–1995: Belinzona
- 1995: Gold Coast Rollers
- 1996–1999: Brisbane Bullets
- 1996–1997: Quad City Thunder
- 2000: Sydney Kings
- 2000–2002: Žalgiris Kaunas
- 2002: AEK Athens
- 2003: Lietuvos rytas
- 2003–2004: Honka Espoo
- 2004: Sioux Falls Skyforce
- 2004–2005: Jämtland Basket

Coaching
- 2006–2012: Missouri State (assistant)
- 2012–2014: Tulsa (assistant)
- 2014–2020: Wake Forest (assistant)
- 2024–present: Missouri State (assistant)

Career highlights
- NBL Most Valuable Player (1999); 2× All-NBL First Team (1998, 1999); All-NBL Second Team (1997); All-NBL Third Team (1996); LKL champion (2001)
Medals
Men's basketball
Representing United States
FIBA U21 World Championship
| Gold medal – first place | 1993 Valladolid | National team |

Steve Woodberry (born October 9, 1971) is an American basketball coach and former professional player. He played professionally in the Australian National Basketball League and Europe as a point guard, shooting guard and small forward.

== Playing career ==
Woodberry was born in Wichita, Kansas and attended Wichita South High School. He played on two state title teams and was named Kansas Naismith Player of the Year as a senior in 1990.

He then played college basketball with the Kansas Jayhawks and was a part of two Final Four teams at Kansas in 1991 and 1993. Woodberry was named to the second team All-Big Eight in both his junior and senior season.

In 1994 Woodberry won a championship in the Swiss league with Belinzona and then moved to Australia where he played for the Gold Coast Rollers in 1995. In his first season in Australia, Woodberry averaged 24.5 points, 7.4 assists and 7.6 rebounds per game. However, he suffered a training accident and was forced to return to Kansas for intensive training and recovery.

Woodberry returned to Australia in 1996 to play for the Brisbane Bullets. With the Bullets he was the NBL Most Valuable Player in 1999 and was named in the All-NBL First Team in 1998 and 1999. He then played a single season with the Sydney Kings in 2000. During the 1996–97 season, Woodberry played for the Quad City Thunder of the Continental Basketball Association, averaging 9.9 points in 30 games.

Woodberry subsequently spent two seasons playing professionally in Lithuania for Zalgiris Kaunas, which won a Lithuanian championship in 2001 when he was voted the league's Import Player of the Year. He later signed for the Athletic Union of Constantinople in Athens, Greece (2002–2003), but ended season in Lithuania BC Lietuvos Rytas, then joined Jamtland in Sweden (2004) and Honka Espoo in Finland (2004), before retiring as an active player in 2006.

== Coaching career ==
Woodberry was an assistant basketball coach at Missouri State from 2006 to 2012. He left in 2012 to become an assistant to fellow Kansas alum Danny Manning at Tulsa. He then followed Manning to Wake Forest in 2014. In 2021, Woodberry became an NBA scout for the Minnesota Timberwolves.

== Career statistics ==
Legend
| GP | Games played | GS | Games started | MPG | Minutes per game |
| FG% | Field-goal percentage | 3P% | 3-point field-goal percentage | FT% | Free-throw percentage |
| RPG | Rebounds per game | APG | Assists per game | SPG | Steals per game |
| BPG | Blocks per game | PPG | Points per game | PIR | Performance index rating |
| **Bold** | Career high |

=== Euroleague ===
| Year | Team | GP | GS | MPG | FG% | 3P% | FT% | RPG | APG | SPG | BPG | PPG | PIR |
|---|---|---|---|---|---|---|---|---|---|---|---|---|---|
| 2000–01 | Žalgiris | 12 | 12 | **33.8** | .432 | **.438** | **.750** | **4.8** | 2.8 | **1.6** | **.3** | 11.9 | 13.8 |
| 2001–02 | Žalgiris | **14** | **14** | 31.2 | .496 | .333 | .696 | 4.5 | **3.1** | 1.4 | .1 | **12.5** | **15.1** |
| 2002–03 | AEK Athens | 1 | 0 | 17.0 | **.667** | .000 | .500 | 1.0 | 2.0 | .0 | .0 | 5.0 | 6.0 |
| Career | | 27 | 26 | 31.9 | .468 | .389 | .711 | 4.5 | 2.9 | 1.4 | .2 | 12.0 | 14.2 |
