= 1998 NBL season =

Professional basketball season

- League: National Basketball League
- Season: 1998
- Dates: 30 January – 1 July 1998
- Teams: 11
- TV partners: Australia: ABC; Fox Sports

Regular season
- Season champions: S.E. Melbourne Magic
- Season MVP: (Australia) Andrew Gaze (Melbourne)

Finals
- Champions: Adelaide 36ers (2nd title)
- Runners-up: S.E. Melbourne Magic
- Semi-finalists: Perth Wildcats; Brisbane Bullets
- Finals MVP: (United States) Kevin Brooks (Adelaide)

Statistical leaders
Points	(Australia) Andrew Gaze (Melbourne)	31.5
Rebounds	(United States) Ray Owes (Townsville)	12.6
Assists	(United States) Derek Rucker (Townsville)	7.0

NBL seasons
- ← 1997 1998–99 →

The 1998 NBL season was the 20th season of competition since its establishment in 1979. A total of 11 teams contest the league. This season marked the NBL's final winter season. The Illawarra Hawks were renamed the Wollongong Hawks.

== Regular season ==
The 1998 regular season took place over 19 rounds between 30 January 1998 and 9 June 1998.

=== Round 1 ===
Date	Home	Score	Away	Venue	Crowd	Boxscore
30/01/1998	Newcastle Falcons	73–93	South East Melbourne Magic	Newcastle Entertainment Centre	N/A	boxscore
30/01/1998	Brisbane Bullets	105–97	Melbourne Tigers	Brisbane Convention & Exhibition Centre	N/A	boxscore
30/01/1998	Perth Wildcats	87–89	Townsville Suns	Perth Entertainment Centre	N/A	boxscore
30/01/1998	Wollongong Hawks	109–96	North Melbourne Giants	Beaton Park Stadium	N/A	boxscore
31/01/1998	Adelaide 36ers	125–86	Townsville Suns	Adelaide Arena	N/A	boxscore
31/01/1998	South East Melbourne Magic	105–87	Wollongong Hawks	Dandenong Stadium	N/A	boxscore
1/02/1998	Canberra Cannons	96–123	Sydney Kings	AIS Arena	N/A	boxscore

=== Round 2 ===
Date	Home	Score	Away	Venue	Crowd	Boxscore
7/02/1998	Brisbane Bullets	79–91	Perth Wildcats	Carrara Indoor Stadium	N/A	boxscore
7/02/1998	Wollongong Hawks	96–92	Newcastle Falcons	Beaton Park Stadium	N/A	boxscore
7/02/1998	Canberra Cannons	108–82	North Melbourne Giants	AIS Arena	N/A	boxscore
8/02/1998	Adelaide 36ers	94–96	South East Melbourne Magic	Adelaide Arena	N/A	boxscore
10/02/1998	Melbourne Tigers	115–111	Townsville Suns	Melbourne Sports and Entertainment Centre	N/A	boxscore

=== Round 3 ===
Date	Home	Score	Away	Venue	Crowd	Boxscore
11/02/1998	Perth Wildcats	103–92	Canberra Cannons	Perth Entertainment Centre	N/A	boxscore
11/02/1998	Newcastle Falcons	90–105	Sydney Kings	Newcastle Entertainment Centre	N/A	boxscore
13/02/1998	Wollongong Hawks	81–95	Brisbane Bullets	Beaton Park Stadium	N/A	boxscore
14/02/1998	Adelaide 36ers	104–88	North Melbourne Giants	Adelaide Arena	N/A	boxscore
14/02/1998	Canberra Cannons	100–129	Townsville Suns	AIS Arena	N/A	boxscore
14/02/1998	Sydney Kings	93–92	Melbourne Tigers	Sydney Entertainment Centre	N/A	boxscore
15/02/1998	South East Melbourne Magic	104–88	Townsville Suns	Dandenong Stadium	N/A	boxscore
15/02/1998	Perth Wildcats	120–98	North Melbourne Giants	Perth Entertainment Centre	N/A	boxscore
17/02/1998	Melbourne Tigers	121–96	Wollongong Hawks	Melbourne Sports and Entertainment Centre	N/A	boxscore

=== Round 4 ===
Date	Home	Score	Away	Venue	Crowd	Boxscore
19/02/1998	Perth Wildcats	101–108	Melbourne Tigers	Perth Entertainment Centre	N/A	boxscore
20/02/1998	Brisbane Bullets	92–90	Newcastle Falcons	Brisbane Convention & Exhibition Centre	N/A	boxscore
20/02/1998	Adelaide 36ers	119–100	Sydney Kings	Adelaide Arena	N/A	boxscore
21/02/1998	Sydney Kings	100–109	Brisbane Bullets	Sydney Entertainment Centre	N/A	boxscore
21/02/1998	Newcastle Falcons	110–96	Townsville Suns	Newcastle Entertainment Centre	N/A	boxscore
21/02/1998	North Melbourne Giants	81–93	South East Melbourne Magic	Melbourne Sports and Entertainment Centre	N/A	boxscore
21/02/1998	Wollongong Hawks	110–107	Perth Wildcats	Beaton Park Stadium	N/A	boxscore

=== Round 5 ===
Date	Home	Score	Away	Venue	Crowd	Boxscore
25/02/1998	Sydney Kings	105–116	Perth Wildcats	Sydney Entertainment Centre	N/A	boxscore
27/02/1998	North Melbourne Giants	102–82	Melbourne Tigers	Melbourne Sports and Entertainment Centre	N/A	boxscore
27/02/1998	Perth Wildcats	123–87	Newcastle Falcons	Perth Entertainment Centre	N/A	boxscore
27/02/1998	Townsville Suns	103–108	South East Melbourne Magic	Townsville Entertainment Centre	N/A	boxscore
28/02/1998	Wollongong Hawks	103–93	Canberra Cannons	Beaton Park Stadium	N/A	boxscore
28/02/1998	Brisbane Bullets	81–76	South East Melbourne Magic	Brisbane Convention & Exhibition Centre	N/A	boxscore
1/03/1998	Adelaide 36ers	108–97	Melbourne Tigers	Adelaide Arena	N/A	boxscore
3/03/1998	Newcastle Falcons	112–85	Sydney Kings	Newcastle Entertainment Centre	N/A	boxscore

=== Round 6 ===
Date	Home	Score	Away	Venue	Crowd	Boxscore
6/03/1998	Brisbane Bullets	115–90	North Melbourne Giants	Brisbane Convention & Exhibition Centre	N/A	boxscore
6/03/1998	Newcastle Falcons	94–110	Adelaide 36ers	Newcastle Entertainment Centre	N/A	boxscore
6/03/1998	Perth Wildcats	76–92	South East Melbourne Magic	Perth Entertainment Centre	N/A	boxscore
7/03/1998	Townsville Suns	95–104	North Melbourne Giants	Townsville Entertainment Centre	N/A	boxscore
7/03/1998	Melbourne Tigers	104–109	Brisbane Bullets	Melbourne Sports and Entertainment Centre	N/A	boxscore
7/03/1998	Sydney Kings	99–108	Wollongong Hawks	Sydney Entertainment Centre	N/A	boxscore
8/03/1998	Canberra Cannons	100–103	Melbourne Tigers	AIS Arena	N/A	boxscore
8/03/1998	Adelaide 36ers	103–87	Perth Wildcats	Adelaide Arena	N/A	boxscore

=== Round 7 ===
Date	Home	Score	Away	Venue	Crowd	Boxscore
11/03/1998	South East Melbourne Magic	115–88	Sydney Kings	Melbourne Park	N/A	boxscore
13/03/1998	Townsville Suns	101–93	Newcastle Falcons	Townsville Entertainment Centre	N/A	boxscore
13/03/1998	Wollongong Hawks	95–83	Melbourne Tigers	Beaton Park Stadium	N/A	boxscore
13/03/1998	Sydney Kings	105–90	Brisbane Bullets	Sydney Entertainment Centre	N/A	boxscore
14/03/1998	Melbourne Tigers	88–105	South East Melbourne Magic	Melbourne Park	N/A	boxscore
14/03/1998	North Melbourne Giants	97–91	Sydney Kings	Melbourne Sports and Entertainment Centre	N/A	boxscore
14/03/1998	Brisbane Bullets	109–74	Canberra Cannons	Carrara Indoor Stadium	N/A	boxscore
14/03/1998	Adelaide 36ers	92–87	Wollongong Hawks	Adelaide Arena	N/A	boxscore
15/03/1998	Canberra Cannons	96–82	Newcastle Falcons	AIS Arena	N/A	boxscore
15/03/1998	Perth Wildcats	101–114	Townsville Suns	Perth Entertainment Centre	N/A	boxscore

=== Round 8 ===
Date	Home	Score	Away	Venue	Crowd	Boxscore
20/03/1998	Wollongong Hawks	93–111	South East Melbourne Magic	Beaton Park Stadium	N/A	boxscore
20/03/1998	Townsville Suns	116–98	Brisbane Bullets	Townsville Entertainment Centre	N/A	boxscore
20/03/1998	Melbourne Tigers	121–89	Adelaide 36ers	Melbourne Park	N/A	boxscore
20/03/1998	North Melbourne Giants	96–99	Canberra Cannons	Melbourne Sports and Entertainment Centre	N/A	boxscore
21/03/1998	Sydney Kings	94–89	Townsville Suns	Sydney Entertainment Centre	N/A	boxscore
21/03/1998	Adelaide 36ers	104–88	Canberra Cannons	Adelaide Arena	N/A	boxscore
21/03/1998	Brisbane Bullets	92–97	Wollongong Hawks	Brisbane Convention & Exhibition Centre	N/A	boxscore
22/03/1998	South East Melbourne Magic	116–81	North Melbourne Giants	Melbourne Park	N/A	boxscore
22/03/1998	Perth Wildcats	82–85	Newcastle Falcons	Perth Entertainment Centre	N/A	boxscore

=== Round 9 ===
Date	Home	Score	Away	Venue	Crowd	Boxscore
25/03/1998	South East Melbourne Magic	90–74	Newcastle Falcons	Melbourne Park	N/A	boxscore
27/03/1998	Canberra Cannons	94–91	Townsville Suns	AIS Arena	N/A	boxscore
27/03/1998	Sydney Kings	96–105	Perth Wildcats	Sydney Entertainment Centre	N/A	boxscore
28/03/1998	Townsville Suns	85–93	Adelaide 36ers	Townsville Entertainment Centre	N/A	boxscore
28/03/1998	Melbourne Tigers	115–86	Sydney Kings	Melbourne Park	N/A	boxscore
28/03/1998	Wollongong Hawks	92–97	Canberra Cannons	Beaton Park Stadium	N/A	boxscore
29/03/1998	Newcastle Falcons	101–104	Melbourne Tigers	Newcastle Entertainment Centre	N/A	boxscore
29/03/1998	North Melbourne Giants	110–92	Wollongong Hawks	Melbourne Sports and Entertainment Centre	N/A	boxscore
29/03/1998	Brisbane Bullets	86–96	Perth Wildcats	Brisbane Convention & Exhibition Centre	N/A	boxscore

=== Round 10 ===
Date	Home	Score	Away	Venue	Crowd	Boxscore
2/04/1998	Perth Wildcats	106–84	South East Melbourne Magic	Perth Entertainment Centre	N/A	boxscore
3/04/1998	Newcastle Falcons	94–102	Wollongong Hawks	Newcastle Entertainment Centre	N/A	boxscore
3/04/1998	Brisbane Bullets	112–82	Sydney Kings	Brisbane Convention & Exhibition Centre	N/A	boxscore
3/04/1998	Townsville Suns	98–91	North Melbourne Giants	Townsville Entertainment Centre	N/A	boxscore
4/04/1998	North Melbourne Giants	115–99	Adelaide 36ers	Melbourne Sports and Entertainment Centre	N/A	boxscore
4/04/1998	Melbourne Tigers	108–101	Brisbane Bullets	Melbourne Park	N/A	boxscore
5/04/1998	Wollongong Hawks	89–98	Perth Wildcats	Beaton Park Stadium	N/A	boxscore
5/04/1998	South East Melbourne Magic	96–92	Townsville Suns	Melbourne Park	N/A	boxscore
5/04/1998	Sydney Kings	106–99	Canberra Cannons	Sydney Entertainment Centre	N/A	boxscore

=== Round 11 ===
Date	Home	Score	Away	Venue	Crowd	Boxscore
8/04/1998	Melbourne Tigers	98–97	Wollongong Hawks	Melbourne Park	N/A	boxscore
9/04/1998	Adelaide 36ers	85–111	Newcastle Falcons	Adelaide Arena	N/A	boxscore
11/04/1998	South East Melbourne Magic	84–79	Brisbane Bullets	Melbourne Park	N/A	boxscore
11/04/1998	Townsville Suns	94–113	Perth Wildcats	Townsville Entertainment Centre	N/A	boxscore
11/04/1998	Canberra Cannons	90–96	Adelaide 36ers	AIS Arena	N/A	boxscore
12/04/1998	Wollongong Hawks	98–106	Sydney Kings	Beaton Park Stadium	N/A	boxscore
12/04/1998	North Melbourne Giants	99–89	Newcastle Falcons	Melbourne Sports and Entertainment Centre	N/A	boxscore
13/04/1998	Townsville Suns	100–99	Brisbane Bullets	Townsville Entertainment Centre	N/A	boxscore

=== Round 12 ===
Date	Home	Score	Away	Venue	Crowd	Boxscore
17/04/1998	Newcastle Falcons	88–80	North Melbourne Giants	Newcastle Entertainment Centre	N/A	boxscore
17/04/1998	Adelaide 36ers	111–102	Sydney Kings	Adelaide Arena	N/A	boxscore
17/04/1998	Wollongong Hawks	102–93	Townsville Suns	Beaton Park Stadium	N/A	boxscore
17/04/1998	Canberra Cannons	109–104	South East Melbourne Magic	AIS Arena	N/A	boxscore
18/04/1998	North Melbourne Giants	106–112	Melbourne Tigers	Melbourne Sports and Entertainment Centre	N/A	boxscore
19/04/1998	Townsville Suns	85–88	Canberra Cannons	Townsville Entertainment Centre	N/A	boxscore
19/04/1998	Brisbane Bullets	86–102	Adelaide 36ers	Brisbane Convention & Exhibition Centre	N/A	boxscore
19/04/1998	Perth Wildcats	103–104	Sydney Kings	Perth Entertainment Centre	N/A	boxscore
20/04/1998	Melbourne Tigers	109–113	Newcastle Falcons	Melbourne Sports and Entertainment Centre	N/A	boxscore

=== Round 13 ===
Date	Home	Score	Away	Venue	Crowd	Boxscore
22/04/1998	Sydney Kings	119–115	Melbourne Tigers	Sydney Entertainment Centre	N/A	boxscore
24/04/1998	Newcastle Falcons	86–132	South East Melbourne Magic	Newcastle Entertainment Centre	N/A	boxscore
24/04/1998	North Melbourne Giants	103–110	Wollongong Hawks	Melbourne Sports and Entertainment Centre	N/A	boxscore
24/04/1998	Adelaide 36ers	113–90	Brisbane Bullets	Adelaide Arena	N/A	boxscore
25/04/1998	Brisbane Bullets	102–103	Townsville Suns	Brisbane Convention & Exhibition Centre	N/A	boxscore
25/04/1998	Canberra Cannons	109–96	Sydney Kings	AIS Arena	N/A	boxscore
26/04/1998	Townsville Suns	95–94	Melbourne Tigers	Townsville Entertainment Centre	N/A	boxscore
26/04/1998	Perth Wildcats	103–102	North Melbourne Giants	Perth Entertainment Centre	N/A	boxscore
26/04/1998	Wollongong Hawks	100–114	Adelaide 36ers	Beaton Park Stadium	N/A	boxscore

=== Round 14 ===
Date	Home	Score	Away	Venue	Crowd	Boxscore
29/04/1998	South East Melbourne Magic	87–75	Canberra Cannons	Melbourne Park	N/A	boxscore
1/05/1998	Melbourne Tigers	102–112	Canberra Cannons	Melbourne Park	N/A	boxscore
1/05/1998	Townsville Suns	105–117	Adelaide 36ers	Townsville Entertainment Centre	N/A	boxscore
1/05/1998	Sydney Kings	102–98	North Melbourne Giants	Sydney Entertainment Centre	N/A	boxscore
2/05/1998	Perth Wildcats	121–99	Melbourne Tigers	Perth Entertainment Centre	N/A	boxscore
2/05/1998	Newcastle Falcons	74–98	Brisbane Bullets	Newcastle Entertainment Centre	N/A	boxscore
2/05/1998	South East Melbourne Magic	126–108	Sydney Kings	Melbourne Park	N/A	boxscore
3/05/1998	Adelaide 36ers	106–97	Perth Wildcats	Adelaide Arena	N/A	boxscore
3/05/1998	Canberra Cannons	84–92	Brisbane Bullets	AIS Arena	N/A	boxscore
3/05/1998	North Melbourne Giants	119–112	Newcastle Falcons	Melbourne Sports and Entertainment Centre	N/A	boxscore

=== Round 15 ===
Date	Home	Score	Away	Venue	Crowd	Boxscore
6/05/1998	South East Melbourne Magic	116–73	Wollongong Hawks	Melbourne Park	N/A	boxscore
8/05/1998	Melbourne Tigers	96–114	Townsville Suns	Melbourne Park	N/A	boxscore
8/05/1998	Canberra Cannons	99–112	Perth Wildcats	AIS Arena	N/A	boxscore
9/05/1998	Adelaide 36ers	103–122	Melbourne Tigers	Adelaide Arena	N/A	boxscore
9/05/1998	Newcastle Falcons	90–97	Perth Wildcats	Newcastle Entertainment Centre	N/A	boxscore
9/05/1998	North Melbourne Giants	80–85	Canberra Cannons	Melbourne Sports and Entertainment Centre	N/A	boxscore
10/05/1998	Sydney Kings	121–147	Adelaide 36ers	Sydney Entertainment Centre	N/A	boxscore
10/05/1998	Brisbane Bullets	77–107	South East Melbourne Magic	Brisbane Convention & Exhibition Centre	N/A	boxscore
11/05/1998	Townsville Suns	98–113	Wollongong Hawks	Townsville Entertainment Centre	N/A	boxscore

=== Round 16 ===
Date	Home	Score	Away	Venue	Crowd	Boxscore
13/05/1998	South East Melbourne Magic	77–74	Adelaide 36ers	Melbourne Park	N/A	boxscore
15/05/1998	Canberra Cannons	85–88	Melbourne Tigers	AIS Arena	N/A	boxscore
15/05/1998	Sydney Kings	96–109	Newcastle Falcons	Sydney Entertainment Centre	N/A	boxscore
15/05/1998	Wollongong Hawks	88–90	Brisbane Bullets	Beaton Park Stadium	N/A	boxscore
16/05/1998	Brisbane Bullets	115–103	North Melbourne Giants	Brisbane Convention & Exhibition Centre	N/A	boxscore
16/05/1998	Newcastle Falcons	99–102	Canberra Cannons	Newcastle Entertainment Centre	N/A	boxscore
16/05/1998	Perth Wildcats	106–103	Adelaide 36ers	Perth Entertainment Centre	N/A	boxscore
17/05/1998	North Melbourne Giants	92–111	Townsville Suns	Melbourne Sports and Entertainment Centre	N/A	boxscore
17/05/1998	Melbourne Tigers	82–92	South East Melbourne Magic	Melbourne Park	N/A	boxscore

=== Round 17 ===
Date	Home	Score	Away	Venue	Crowd	Boxscore
22/05/1998	Newcastle Falcons	79–80	Brisbane Bullets	Newcastle Entertainment Centre	N/A	boxscore
22/05/1998	Townsville Suns	113–108	Sydney Kings	Townsville Entertainment Centre	N/A	boxscore
22/05/1998	Melbourne Tigers	117–98	Perth Wildcats	Melbourne Park	N/A	boxscore
22/05/1998	North Melbourne Giants	116–101	Adelaide 36ers	Melbourne Sports and Entertainment Centre	N/A	boxscore
22/05/1998	Canberra Cannons	103–104	South East Melbourne Magic	AIS Arena	N/A	boxscore
23/05/1998	Adelaide 36ers	118–85	Canberra Cannons	Adelaide Arena	N/A	boxscore
23/05/1998	South East Melbourne Magic	93–89	North Melbourne Giants	Melbourne Park	N/A	boxscore
23/05/1998	Sydney Kings	107–81	Wollongong Hawks	Sydney Entertainment Centre	N/A	boxscore
24/05/1998	Wollongong Hawks	99–88	Newcastle Falcons	Beaton Park Stadium	N/A	boxscore
24/05/1998	Perth Wildcats	97–82	Brisbane Bullets	Perth Entertainment Centre	N/A	boxscore

=== Round 18 ===
Date	Home	Score	Away	Venue	Crowd	Boxscore
27/05/1998	South East Melbourne Magic	95–86	Perth Wildcats	Melbourne Park	N/A	boxscore
29/05/1998	Townsville Suns	86–91	Newcastle Falcons	Townsville Entertainment Centre	N/A	boxscore
29/05/1998	Canberra Cannons	105–95	Perth Wildcats	AIS Arena	N/A	boxscore
29/05/1998	Adelaide 36ers	112–89	Wollongong Hawks	Adelaide Arena	N/A	boxscore
29/05/1998	North Melbourne Giants	91–110	Brisbane Bullets	Melbourne Sports and Entertainment Centre	N/A	boxscore
30/05/1998	Brisbane Bullets	102–114	Canberra Cannons	Brisbane Convention & Exhibition Centre	N/A	boxscore
30/05/1998	Sydney Kings	107–110	South East Melbourne Magic	Sydney Entertainment Centre	N/A	boxscore
30/05/1998	Melbourne Tigers	119–85	North Melbourne Giants	Melbourne Park	N/A	boxscore
31/05/1998	Newcastle Falcons	91–85	Adelaide 36ers	Newcastle Entertainment Centre	N/A	boxscore
31/05/1998	Wollongong Hawks	109–97	Townsville Suns	Beaton Park Stadium	N/A	boxscore

=== Round 19 ===
Date	Home	Score	Away	Venue	Crowd	Boxscore
3/06/1998	South East Melbourne Magic	99–98	Adelaide 36ers	Melbourne Sports and Entertainment Centre	N/A	boxscore
4/06/1998	Canberra Cannons	89–90	Wollongong Hawks	AIS Arena	N/A	boxscore
5/06/1998	Newcastle Falcons	93–104	Canberra Cannons	Newcastle Entertainment Centre	N/A	boxscore
5/06/1998	North Melbourne Giants	109–103	Perth Wildcats	Melbourne Sports and Entertainment Centre	N/A	boxscore
6/06/1998	Sydney Kings	115–113	North Melbourne Giants	Sydney Entertainment Centre	N/A	boxscore
6/06/1998	South East Melbourne Magic	106–110	Melbourne Tigers	Melbourne Park	N/A	boxscore
7/06/1998	Brisbane Bullets	101–89	Adelaide 36ers	Brisbane Convention & Exhibition Centre	N/A	boxscore
7/06/1998	Melbourne Tigers	102–100	Newcastle Falcons	Melbourne Park	N/A	boxscore
9/06/1998	Townsville Suns	131–140	Sydney Kings	Townsville Entertainment Centre	N/A	boxscore
9/06/1998	Perth Wildcats	99–89	Wollongong Hawks	Perth Entertainment Centre	N/A	boxscore

== Ladder ==
Pos	1998 NBL season											
Pos	Team	Pld	W	L	PCT	Last 5	Streak	Home	Away	PF	PA	PP
1	S.E. Melbourne Magic	30	26	4	86.67%	4–1	L1	14–1	12–3	3016	2661	113.34%
2	Adelaide 36ers	30	19	11	63.33%	2–3	L3	12–3	7–8	3114	2932	106.21%
3	Perth Wildcats	30	17	13	56.67%	2–3	W1	9–6	8–7	3029	2911	104.05%
4	Brisbane Bullets^{1}	30	16	14	53.33%	3–2	W1	8–7	8–7	2876	2835	101.45%
5	Melbourne Tigers^{1}	30	16	14	53.33%	4–1	W4	9–6	7–8	3103	3048	101.80%
6	Wollongong Hawks^{2}	30	14	16	46.67%	3–2	L1	8–7	6–9	2875	2995	95.99%
7	Canberra Cannons^{2}	30	14	16	46.67%	3–2	W1	6–9	8–7	2874	2966	96.90%
8	Sydney Kings	30	13	17	43.33%	3–2	W2	8–7	5–10	3089	3228	95.69%
9	Townsville Suns	30	12	18	40.00%	2–3	L3	6–9	6–9	3008	3077	97.76%
10	North Melbourne Giants^{3}	30	9	21	30.00%	1–4	L1	8–7	1–14	2916	3089	94.40%
11	Newcastle Falcons^{3}	30	9	21	30.00%	2–3	L2	4–11	5–10	2790	2948	94.64%

Updated to match(es) played on 9 June 1998. Source: NBL.com.au

The NBL tie-breaker system as outlined in the NBL Rules and Regulations states that in the case of an identical win–loss record, the results in games played between the teams will determine order of seeding.

^{1}Brisbane Bullets won Head-to-Head (2-1).

^{2}Wollongong Hawks won Head-to-Head (2-1).

^{3}North Melbourne Giants won Head-to-Head (2-1).

== Finals ==
=== Playoff bracket ===
Elimination Finals
4	Brisbane Bullets	93	114	X
5	Melbourne Tigers	80	81	X
3	Perth Wildcats	95	120	X
6	Wollongong Hawks	85	97	X

Semifinals
1	S.E. Melbourne Magic	106	90	X
4	Brisbane Bullets	98	84	X
2	Adelaide 36ers	114	117	X
3	Perth Wildcats	97	110	X

Grand Final
1	S.E. Melbourne Magic	93	62	X
2	Adelaide 36ers	100	90	X

=== Elimination Finals ===
Date	Home	Score	Away	Venue	Crowd	Boxscore
12/06/1998	Wollongong Hawks	85–95	Perth Wildcats	Beaton Park Stadium	N/A	boxscore
12/06/1998	Brisbane Bullets	93–80	Melbourne Tigers	Brisbane Convention & Exhibition Centre	N/A	boxscore
14/06/1998	Perth Wildcats	120–97	Wollongong Hawks	Challenge Stadium	N/A	boxscore
14/06/1998	Melbourne Tigers	81–114	Brisbane Bullets	Melbourne Park	N/A	boxscore

=== Semi-finals ===
Date	Home	Score	Away	Venue	Crowd	Boxscore
19/06/1998	Brisbane Bullets	98–106	South East Melbourne Magic	Brisbane Convention & Exhibition Centre	N/A	boxscore
19/06/1998	Perth Wildcats	97–114	Adelaide 36ers	Challenge Stadium	N/A	boxscore
21/06/1998	South East Melbourne Magic	90–84	Brisbane Bullets	Melbourne Park	N/A	boxscore
21/06/1998	Adelaide 36ers	117–110	Perth Wildcats	Adelaide Arena	N/A	boxscore

=== Grand Final ===
Date	Home	Score	Away	Venue	Crowd	Boxscore
28/06/1998	Adelaide 36ers	100–93	South East Melbourne Magic	Adelaide Arena	N/A	boxscore
1/07/1998	South East Melbourne Magic	62–90	Adelaide 36ers	Melbourne Park	N/A	boxscore

== 1998 NBL statistics leaders ==
Category	Player	Team	Stat
Points per game	Andrew Gaze	Melbourne Tigers	31.5
Rebounds per game	Ray Owes	Townsville Suns	12.6
Assists per game	Derek Rucker	Townsville Suns	7.0
Steals per game	Clint McDaniel	South East Melbourne Magic	2.7
Blocks per game	Simon Dwight	Canberra Cannons	2.6
Free throw percentage	Steve Woodberry	Brisbane Bullets	92.2%

== NBL awards ==
- Most Valuable Player: Andrew Gaze, Melbourne Tigers
- Most Valuable Player Grand Final: Kevin Brooks, Adelaide 36ers
- Best Defensive Player: Mike Kelly, South East Melbourne Magic
- Most Improved Player: Ben Melmeth, Newcastle Falcons
- Rookie of the Year: David Smith, North Melbourne Giants
- Coach of the Year: Brian Goorjian, South East Melbourne Magic

== All NBL Team ==
#	Player	Team
PG	Derek Rucker	Townsville Suns
SG	Steve Woodberry	Brisbane Bullets
SF	Andrew Gaze	Melbourne Tigers
PF	Ray Owes	Townsville Suns
C	Ben Melmeth	Newcastle Falcons
