= South Dragons =

Defunct professional basketball team from Melbourne, Australia

- Leagues: NBL
- Founded: 2006
- Dissolved: 2009
- History: South Dragons; 2006–2009
- Arena: Melbourne Arena
- Capacity: 10,500
- Location: Melbourne, Victoria, Australia
- Team colors: Red, black, white
- Championships: 1 (2009)
Home	Away

The South Dragons was an Australian professional men's basketball team in the National Basketball League (NBL). It debuted in the 2006/07 season and played its final season in 2008/09. The club was based at MSAC in Melbourne's inner south-eastern suburbs, and was one of the city's two NBL teams; the other was the Melbourne Tigers, which entered the league in 1984.

== History ==
On 13 October 2005, Mark Cowan, a graphic designer and owner of Cowan Basketball, and Raphael Geminder, chairman of Visy, bought the license of the former Victoria Giants/Titans NBL franchise to establish a new NBL team in Melbourne. Cowan owned 51%, with Geminder owning the remaining 49%. The team's name and uniforms were not announced until 15 December 2005, and until that time the Cowan Basketball website left a message "UNLEASHED 15.12.2005" as the only details on the team.

The Dragons entered the NBL in the 2006–07 season as the 12th franchise, and promised to look to fill its roster with young Australian basketballers returning home after playing NCAA college basketball in the United States. The team's first signing was Joe Ingles at the age of 18. The first members of the development squad (started in the team's second season) were Adam Barras and Ashly Donald from the Warrandyte Venom (formally of the SEABL) both aged 19.

The Dragons hired former NBA All-Star Mark Price as their inaugural head coach on 1 March 2006. Price is arguably the biggest name to play a major role in any Australian basketball club. His appointment was announced one day after the Melbourne Tigers had won the 2005-06 NBL Championship. The team also hired various other front-office staff with extensive basketball experience, including former WNBA player and Australian team captain Michele Timms as basketball development officer.

The team played its first NBL championship season game on 26 September 2006 against the New Zealand Breakers at the North Shore Events Centre in Auckland, New Zealand, losing 112 to 106.

Price resigned his position on 22 October 2006 after the Dragons lost their first five NBL championship season games, citing family reasons; he was replaced by Shane Heal, who was appointed as captain and interim coach for the remainder of the season, The following day Price spoke to the media and claimed that Heal had undermined his position, stating, "I've been in professional basketball a long time and I've never seen undermining of a coach quite like this before."

The team won its first NBL game on 29 October 2006 against the Cairns Taipans 96–86, having lost its first six games.

On Boxing Day, 2006, the South Dragons claimed a memorable victory over their cross-town rivals, the Melbourne Tigers 107–94, leaving its mark on this newly formed rivalry in front of 9175 fans at Vodafone Arena.

After finishing their first ever season with a 15–18 record, the Dragons reached the knockout phase of the playoffs - losing to Cairns 97–118 on 15 February 2007 at the Cairns Convention Centre.

The team's season 2007/2008 campaign began on 22 September 2007 against the West Sydney Razorbacks at Vodafone Arena with a 116–106 loss. It was a turbulent season for the club, ending with the club's chairman Mark Cowan stepping down and the sacking of star player/coach Shane Heal. This came after the team once again started the season with six straight losses, prompting the sacking of import Nick Horvath, who was replaced by American Bakari Hendrix. Initially the move looked to have paid dividends as the Dragons claimed their first win of the season on 28 October at home to New Zealand. However, wins once again dried-up, with only another 3 coming in the remainder of the 2007 calendar year. On 9 January 2008, with the team sitting on the bottom of the ladder at 4–17, assistant coach Michele Timms resigned from the club, citing overseas job opportunities as the reason behind her sudden departure. Timms wouldn't be the only coach to go, as the club announced on 1 February 2008 that player-coach Shane Heal had been sacked, effective immediately. The last coach remaining at the Dragons- Guy Molloy- took over as interim coach for the final four games of the season, and took just two games to secure an elusive victory and snap a 14-game losing streak with a 95–90 win over Cairns at Vodafone Arena on 6 February. Despite returning to the winners list and showing greater energy and competitiveness under Molloy, the Dragons finished the season on the bottom of the ladder with a 5–25 record. On 1 April 2008, Brian Goorjian was signed as head coach on a 3-year deal.

== Recruiting process for first season ==
At the team's 15 December launch, Cowan said, "If you're Victorian and you're in college and coming home, you're on our list." It was believed the team was looking to sign Luke Schenscher – a member of the 2004 Georgia Tech team which went to the NCAA championship game against the University of Connecticut, and at the time an NBA Development League player – as its first marquee player.

On 3 March 2006, it was reported by Melbourne's Herald Sun newspaper that former Australian star Shane Heal was considering coming out of retirement to captain the Dragons for the 2006-07 NBL season, and is involved in contract negotiations with the team. He officially signed with the team on 6 April as the Dragons' inaugural captain.

On 17 March 2006, 18-year-old Australian Institute of Sport graduate Joe Ingles became the team's first signed player. The Dragons were unable to sign Schenscher because the Chicago Bulls called him up to fill a roster vacancy earlier that month.

== 2008–09 – "Our Time Is Now" ==
After a disastrous 2007–08 NBL season, in which the team only won a handful of games, the Dragons looked set to try to rebuild quickly. Captain-Coach Shane Heal was sacked along with multiple players. The Dragons signed on former Sydney Kings coach Brian Goorjian as their head coach. From there the Dragons signed on Nick Horvath as their starting centre, Mika Vukona from the New Zealand Breakers, former Sydney Kings player Mark Worthington, former Brisbane Bullets point guard Adam Gibson, and former West Sydney Razorbacks point guard Rhys Carter. The team were believed to have signed star NBL player Ebi Ere but he decided to sign on with the Dragons' crosstown rivals the Melbourne Tigers. Instead the Dragons signed on high-flying American Tremmell Darden as their second import alongside Cortez Groves.

The team started the season with a 6-point loss to the Cairns Taipans. The Dragons rebounded by beating the Perth Wildcats twice. Next the Dragons lost a close match against the Townsville Crocodiles. After this coach Brian Goodjian blasted his team for their slow start, in which the team trailed by as much as 20 points in the first half. After this the Dragons rebuilt by beating the Gold Coast Blaze by 17 points, the Wollongong Hawks by 19 points and the Sydney Spirit by 5 points. Next up for the Dragons was the local derby against the Tigers. 9308 fans and spectators packed into the Dragons' home court of Hisense Arena. The contest was close early but a strong finish to the first quarter and strong defensive pressure saw the Dragons crush the Tigers 108–80, making it the biggest winning margin for the club in their history. The win saw the Dragons take top spot on the ladder. After the win coach Brian Goorjian commented that The Dragons' time is now. The Dragons followed this up with their fifth straight win against the Cairns Taipans. The Dragons dominated the contest from the start and led by as much as 37 points before eventually winning by 29 points. A neck injury which sidelined crowd favourite Cortez Groves saw the Dragons move on quickly, releasing Groves and signing Donta Smith. Smith bought a level the NBL has been missing and was an important key to the success to come. The Dragons finished the regular season in top spot on the ladder and had home-court advantage throughout the playoffs. The home-court advantage was crucial as they went on to win the championship by defeating Townsville 2–1 in the semi-final and Melbourne 3–2 in the Grand Final series.

== Honour Roll ==
NBL Championships:	1 (2008/09)
NBL Finals Appearances:	2 (2006/07, 2008/09)
NBL Grand Final Appearances:	1 (2008/09)
NBL Most Valuable Players:	–
NBL Grand Final MVPs:	Donta Smith (2009)
All-NBL First Team:	Mark Worthington (2008/09)
All-NBL Second Team:	–
All-NBL Third Team:	Kavossy Franklin (2006/07), Adam Gibson (2008/09), Joe Ingles (2008/09)
NBL Rookie of the Year:	Joe Ingles (2006/07)
NBL Most Improved Player:	–
NBL Best Defensive Player:	Adam Gibson (2008/09)
NBL Best Sixth Man:	–
NBL Coach of the Year:	Brian Goorjian (2008/09)

== Season by season ==
NBL champions	League champions	Runners-up	Finals berth

Season	Tier	League	Regular season					Post-season	Head coach	Captain	Club MVP
Season	Tier	League	Finish	Played	Wins	Losses	Win %	Post-season	Head coach	Captain	Club MVP
South Dragons
2006–07	1	NBL	7th	33	15	18	.455	Lost elimination final (Cairns) 97–118	Mark Price; Shane Heal	Shane Heal	Kavossy Franklin
2007–08	1	NBL	13th	30	5	25	.167	Did not qualify	Shane Heal; Guy Molloy	Jacob Holmes; Matt Shanahan	Cortez Groves
2008–09	1	NBL	1st	30	22	8	.733	Won semifinals (Townsville) 2–1; Won NBL finals (Melbourne) 3–2	Brian Goorjian	Mark Worthington	Mark Worthington
Regular season record				93	42	51	.452	1 regular season champions			
Finals record				9	5	4	.556	1 NBL championships			

As of the end of the 2008–09 season
