= 2019 Queensland Basketball League men's regular season =

Queensland Basketball League
- Season: 2019
- Duration: 6 April – 31 August 2019
- Games played: 135
- Teams: 15

Regular season
- Top seed: Brisbane Capitals

Statistical leaders
- Points: Kyle Harvey (29.22 ppg) (Ipswich)
- Rebounds: Bryce Washington (14.63 rpg) (Mackay)
- Assists: Shaun Bruce (9.55 apg) (Rockhampton)

Records
- Biggest home win: 51 points Capitals 119–68 Port City Power (23 June 2019)
- Biggest away win: 50 points Seahawks 55–105 Heat (1 June 2019)
- Highest scoring: 220 points Rockets 115–105 Spartans (19 July 2019)
- Winning streak: 13 games Brisbane Capitals (24 April – 5 July 2019)
- Losing streak: 16 games Gladstone Port City Power (11 May – 3 August 2019)
- All statistics correct as of 5 November 2019.

The 2019 QBL season was the 34th and last season of competition since its establishment in 1979. A total of 30 teams contested the league. The regular season was played between 6 April and 3 August 2019, and the schedule was announced on 22 February 2019.

== Ladder ==
#	Team	Pld	W	L	Last 5	Streak	Home	Away	For	Against	%	Win %
1	Brisbane Capitals	18	17	1	4-1	W4	8-1	9-0	1810	1459	124.06%	94.44%
2	Gold Coast Rollers	18	15	3	5-0	W5	8-1	7-2	1740	1582	109.99%	83.33%
3	Townsville Heat	18	14	4	3-2	L1	8-1	6-3	1699	1518	111.92%	77.78%
4	Cairns Marlins	18	13	5	5-0	W6	8-1	5-4	1635	1458	112.14%	72.22%
5	Rockhampton Rockets	18	12	6	4-1	W2	6-3	6-3	1752	1638	106.96%	66.67%
6	Mackay Meteors	18	11	7	1-4	L2	6-3	5-4	1710	1643	104.08%	61.11%
7	USC Rip City	18	10	8	4-1	W4	5-4	5-4	1626	1636	99.39%	55.56%
8	Logan Thunder	18	9	9	2-3	W1	5-4	4-5	1741	1724	100.99%	50.00%
9	Sunshine Coast Phoenix	18	8	10	2-3	L1	4-5	4-5	1564	1628	96.07%	44.44%
10	South West Metro Pirates	18	7	11	2-3	L1	3-6	4-5	1654	1688	97.99%	38.89%
11	Southern Districts Spartans	18	7	11	3-2	W3	3-6	4-5	1727	1775	97.30%	38.89%
12	Ipswich Force	18	5	13	1-4	L4	2-7	3-6	1715	1808	94.86%	27.78%
13	North Gold Coast Seahawks	18	5	13	1-4	L3	3-6	2-7	1432	1638	87.42%	27.78%
14	Gladstone Port City Power	18	1	17	0-5	L16	0-9	1-8	1539	1828	84.19%	5.56%
15	Toowoomba Mountaineers	18	1	17	0-5	L12	1-8	0-9	1463	1784	82.01%	5.56%

=== Ladder Progression ===
- Numbers highlighted in green indicate that the team finished the round inside the top eight.
- Numbers highlighted in blue indicates the team finished first on the ladder in that round.
- Numbers highlighted in red indicates the team finished last place on the ladder in that round.

Team	1	2	3	4	5	6	7	8	9	10	11	12	13	14	15
Brisbane Capitals	4	2	2	1	1	1	1	1	1	1	1	1	1	1	1
Cairns Marlins	8	8	11	8	9	6	5	5	7	6	6	4	4	4	4
Gladstone Port City Power	10	11	13	13	14	15	15	14	15	15	15	14	14	14	14
Gold Coast Rollers	6	5	5	5	4	4	3	2	3	2	3	2	2	3	2
Ipswich Force	11	12	9	14	13	11	11	12	11	13	12	11	11	12	12
Logan Thunder	12	13	7	11	7	10	10	7	5	7	7	7	7	9	8
Mackay Meteors	7	4	4	3	2	2	2	3	2	4	4	5	5	5	6
North Gold Coast Seahawks	3	6	10	9	11	13	13	11	13	12	13	12	12	13	13
Rockhampton Rockets	5	7	8	7	8	9	8	8	6	5	5	6	6	6	5
South West Metro Pirates	1	10	12	10	10	8	7	9	10	10	10	10	10	10	10
Southern Districts Spartans	14	12	14	12	12	12	12	13	12	11	11	13	13	11	11
Sunshine Coast Phoenix	2	1	1	4	3	5	6	6	8	9	9	8	9	8	9
Toowoomba Mountaineers	13	15	15	15	15	14	14	15	14	14	14	15	15	15	15
Townsville Heat	–	3	3	2	5	3	4	4	4	3	2	3	3	2	3
USC Rip City	9	9	6	6	6	7	9	10	9	8	8	9	8	7	7

== Game log ==
=== Round 1 ===
26 April 2019
20:00

Gold Coast Rollers 87, Mackay Meteors 83

Carrara Indoor Stadium, Gold Coast, Queensland

26 April 2019
20:00

North Gold Coast Seahawks 84, Cairns Marlins 73

Runaway Bay Indoor Stadium, Gold Coast, Queensland

27 April 2019
19:00

Logan Thunder 88, Mackay Meteors 101

Cornubia Park Sports Centre, Brisbane, Queensland

27 April 2019
19:30

Sunshine Coast Phoenix 77, USC Rip City 65

Maroochydore Basketball Stadium, Sunshine Coast, Queensland

27 April 2019
20:00

South West Metro Pirates 90, Toowoomba Mountaineers 76

Hibiscus Stadium, Brisbane, Queensland

27 April 2019
20:00

Glastone Port City Power 92, Rockhampton Rockets 109

Kev Broome Stadium, Gladstone, Queensland

27 April 2019
20:00

Southern Districts Spartans 74, Cairns Marlins 87

Rowland Cowan Stadium, Brisbane, Queensland

28 April 2019
14:00

Brisbane Capitals 90, Cairns Marlins 78

Auchenflower Stadium, Brisbane, Queensland

28 April 2019
15:00

Gold Coast Rollers 95, Southern Districts Spartans 90

Carrara Indoor Stadium, Gold Coast, Queensland

28 April 2019
15:00

Ipswich Force 95, Mackay Meteors 107

Llewellyn Stadium, Ipswich, Queensland

=== Round 2 ===
3 May 2019
20:30

Cairns Marlins 97, South West Metro Pirates 70

Early Settler Stadium, Cairns, Queensland

3 May 2019
20:30

Mackay Meteors 110, USC Rip City 83

McDonald's Mackay Stadium, Mackay, Queensland

4 May 2019
17:00

Brisbane Capitals 110, Gold Coast Rollers 87

Auchenflower Stadium, Brisbane, Queensland

4 May 2019
20:00

Rockhampton Rockets 102, USC Rip City 113

Adani Arena Rockhampton, Rockhampton, Queensland

4 May 2019
20:00

Toowoomba Mountaineers 73, Gladstone Port City Power 81

Clive Berghofer Recreation Centre, Toowoomba, Queensland

4 May 2019
20:00

Townsville Heat 95, South West Metro Pirates 93

Townsville StarFM Stadium, Townsville, Queensland

5 May 2019
14:00

Southern Districts Spartans 122, Gladstone Port City Power 92

Rowland Cowan Stadium, Brisbane, Queensland

5 May 2019
15:00

North Gold Coast Seahawks 87, Sunshine Coast Phoenix 92

Runaway Bay Indoor Stadium, Gold Coast, Queensland

=== Round 3 ===
10 May 2019
20:30

Ipswich Force 98, Rockhampton Rockets 107

Llewellyn Stadium, Ipswich, Queensland

11 May 2019
19:00

Logan Thunder 110, Rockhampton Rockets 102

Cornubia Park Sports Centre, Brisbane, Queensland

11 May 2019
19:00

Ipswich Force 107, Mackay Meteors 98

Llewellyn Stadium, Ipswich, Queensland

11 May 2019
19:00

North Gold Coast Seahawks 76, Brisbane Capitals 99

Runaway Bay Indoor Stadium, Gold Coast, Queensland

11 May 2019
19:30

Sunshine Coast Phoenix 91, Toowoomba Mountaineers 77

Maroochydore Basketball Stadium, Sunshine Coast, Queensland

11 May 2019
20:00

Southern Districts Spartans 88, USC Rip City 96

Rowland Cowan Stadium, Brisbane, Queensland

11 April 2019
20:00

Townsville Heat 90, Cairns Marlins 80

Townsville StarFM Stadium, Townsville, Queensland

12 May 2019
14:00

Gold Coast Rollers 87, Rockhampton Rockets 80

Carrara Indoor Stadium, Gold Coast, Queensland

12 May 2019
14:00

South West Metro Pirates 78, Brisbane Capitals 87

Hibiscus Stadium, Brisbane, Queensland

12 May 2019
14:00

Mackay Meteors 101, Cairns Marlins 89

McDonald's Mackay Stadium, Mackay, Queensland

=== Round 4 ===
17 May 2019
20:00

North Gold Coast Seahawks 77, Toowoomba Mountaineers 65

Runaway Bay Indoor Stadium, Gold Coast, Queensland

17 May 2019
20:00

USC Rip City 70, Brisbane Capitals 88

USC Sports Stadium, Sunshine Coast, Queensland

17 May 2019
20:30

Townsville Heat 111, Ipswich Force 100

Townsville StarFM Stadium, Townsville, Queensland

18 May 2019
19:00

Logan Thunder 103, South West Metro Pirates 116

Cornubia Park Sports Stadium, Brisbane, Queensland

18 May 2019
19:30

USC Rip City 92, North Gold Coast Seahawks 73

USC Sports Stadium, Sunshine Coast, Queensland

18 May 2019
20:00

Rockhampton Rockets 94, Gladstone Port City Power 79

Adani Arena Rockhampton, Rockhampton, Queensland

18 May 2019
20:00

Toowoomba Mountaineers 91, Mackay Meteors 97

Clive Berghofer Recreation Centre, Toowoomba, Queensland

18 May 2019
20:00

Cairns Marlins 102, Ipswich Force 83

Early Settler Stadium, Cairns, Queensland

18 May 2019
20:00

Southern Districts Spartans 84, Brisbane Capitals 100

Rowland Cowan Stadium, Brisbane, Queensland

19 May 2019
14:00

South West Metro Pirates 89, Mackay Meteors 93

Hibiscus Stadium, Brisbane, Queensland

19 May 2019
15:00

Sunshine Coast Phoenix 100, Southern Districts Spartans 105

Maroochydore Basketball Stadium, Sunshine Coast, Queensland

=== Round 5 ===
24 May 2019
20:00

North Gold Coast Seahawks 85, Logan Thunder 99

Runaway Bay Indoor Stadium, Gold Coast, Queensland

24 May 2019
20:30

Cairns Marlins 86, Townsville Heat 67

Early Settler Stadium, Cairns, Queensland

24 May 2019
20:30

Mackay Meteors 98, Gladstone Port City Power 79

McDonald's Mackay Stadium, Mackay, Queensland

=== Round 6 ===
31 May 2019
20:00

Gold Coast Rollers 91, North Gold Coast Seahawks 76

Carrara Indoor Stadium, Gold Coast, Queensland

31 May 2019
20:30

Gladstone Port City Power 80, Sunshine Coast Phoenix 104

Kev Broome Stadium, Gladstone, Queensland

1 June 2019
17:00

Brisbane Capitals 97, USC Rip City 81

Auchenflower Stadium, Brisbane, Queensland

1 June 2019
19:00

Ipswich Force 93, South West Metro Pirates 100

Llewellyn Stadium, Ipswich, Queensland

1 June 2019
19:00

North Gold Coast Seahawks 55, Townsville Heat 105

Runaway Bay Indoor Stadium, Gold Coast, Queensland

1 June 2019
20:00

Rockhampton Rockets 78, Cairns Marlins 99

Adani Arena Rockhampton, Rockhampton, Queensland

1 June 2019
20:00

Toowoomba Mountaineers 98, Logan Thunder 82

Clive Berghofer Recreation Centre, Toowoomba, Queensland

1 June 2019
20:00

Mackay Meteors 111, Sunshine Coast Phoenix 89

McDonald's Mackay Stadium, Mackay, Queensland

2 June 2019
14:00

Gladstone Port City Power 85, Cairns Marlins 90

Kev Broome Stadium, Gladstone, Queensland

2 June 2019
15:00

Southern Districts Spartans 90, Townsville Heat 101

Rowland Cowan Stadium, Brisbane, Queensland

2 June 2019
16:00

Ipswich Force 114, Toowoomba Mountaineers 87

Llewellyn Stadium, Ipswich, Queensland

=== Round 7 ===
8 June 2019
20:00

Toowoomba Mountaineers 77, Gold Coast Rollers 88

Clive Berghofer Recreation Centre, Toowoomba, Queensland

8 June 2019
20:00

South West Metro Pirates 115, Sunshine Coast Phoenix 85

Hibiscus Stadium, Brisbane, Queensland

8 June 2019
20:00

Gladstone Port City Power 82, Townsville Heat 92

Kev Broome Stadium, Gladstone, Queensland

8 June 2019
20:00

Mackay Meteors 113, North Gold Coast Seahawks 89

McDonald's Mackay Stadium, Mackay, Queensland

8 June 2019
20:00

Southern Districts Spartans 87, Logan Thunder 98

Rowland Cowan Stadium, Brisbane, Queensland

9 June 2019
13:00

Rockhampton Rockets 77, Townsville Heat 74

Adani Arena Rockhampton, Rockhampton, Queensland

9 June 2019
15:00

Gold Coast Rollers 105, Logan Thunder 96

Carrara Indoor Stadium, Gold Coast, Queensland

=== Round 8 ===
14 June 2019
20:30

Cairns Marlins 91, Toowoomba Mountaineers 69

Early Settler Stadium, Cairns, Queensland

15 June 2019
19:00

Brisbane Capitals 115, Southern Districts Spartans 83

Auchenflower Stadium, Brisbane, Queensland

15 June 2019
19:00

Logan Thunder 102, Ipswich Force 89

Cornubia Park Sports Centre, Brisbane, Queensland

15 June 2019
19:30

Sunshine Coast Phoenix 65, USC Rip City 71

Maroochydore Basketball Stadium, Sunshine Coast, Queensland

15 June 2019
20:00

Rockhampton Rockets 102, Mackay Meteors 86

Adani Arena Rockhampton, Rockhampton, Queensland

15 June 2019
20:00

South West Metro Pirates 80, Gold Coast Rollers 94

Hibiscus Stadium, Brisbane, Queensland

15 June 2019
20:00

Townsville Heat 104, Toowoomba Mountaineers 78

Townsville StarFM Stadium, Townsville, Queensland

16 June 2019
14:00

Gladstone Port City Power 79, Mackay Meteors 103

Kev Broome Stadium, Gladstone, Queensland

16 June 2019
16:00

Logan Thunder 118, USC Rip City 97

Cornubia Park Sports Centre, Logan, Queensland

16 June 2019
16:00

Sunshine Coast Phoenix 88, Ipswich Force 76

Maroochydore Basketball Stadium, Sunshine Coast, Queensland

=== Round 9 ===
21 June 2019
20:30

Gladstone Port City Power 86, USC Rip City 93

Kev Broome Stadium, Gladstone, Queensland

21 June 2019
20:30

Townsville Heat 111, Gold Coast Rollers 96

Townsville StarFM Stadium, Townsville, Queensland

22 June 2019
19:00

Brisbane Capitals 113, North Gold Coast Seahawks 67

Auchenflower Stadium, Brisbane, Queensland

22 June 2019
19:00

Logan Thunder 108, Toowoomba Mountaineers 81

Cornubia Park Sports Centre, Logan, Queensland

22 June 2019
20:00

Rockhampton Rockets 97, Sunshine Coast Phoenix 79

Adani Arena Rockhampton, Rockhampton, Queensland

22 June 2019
20:00

Cairns Marlins 77, Gold Coast Rollers 82

Early Settler Stadium, Cairns, Queensland

22 June 2019
20:00

South West Metro Pirates 83, Ipswich Force 93

Hibiscus Stadium, Brisbane, Queensland

23 June 2019
13:00

Brisbane Capitals 119, Gladstone Port City Power 68

Auchenflower Stadium, Brisbane, Queensland

23 June 2019
15:00

Southern Districts Spartan 114, South West Metro Pirates 110

Rowland Cowan Stadium, Brisbane, Queensland

=== Round 10 ===
28 June 2019
20:00

USC Rip City 100, Southern Districts Spartans 113

USC Sports Stadium, Sunshine Coast, Queensland

28 June 2019
20:30

Rockhampton Rockets 79, North Gold Coast Seahawks 65

Adani Arena Rockhampton, Rockhampton, Queensland

28 June 2019
20:30

Ipswich Force 88, Gold Coast Rollers 103

Llewellyn Stadium, Ipswich, Queensland

28 June 2019
20:30

Townsville Heat 99, Mackay Meteors 91

Townsville StarFM Stadium, Townsville, Queensland

29 June 2019
19:00

Ipswich Force 96, Brisbane Capitals 97

Llewellyn Stadium, Ipswich, Queensland

29 June 2019
19:30

Sunshine Coast Phoenix 87, Gold Coast Rollers 95

Maroochydore Basketball Stadium, Sunshine Coast, Queensland

29 June 2019
19:30

USC Rip City 113, Toowoomba Mountaineers 94

USC Sports Stadium, Sunshine Coast, Queensland

29 June 2019
20:00

Cairns Marlins 96, Mackay Meteors 77

Early Settler Stadium, Brisbane, Queensland

29 June 2019
20:00

Gladstone Port City Power 89, North Gold Coast Seahawks 105

Kev Broome Stadium, Gladstone, Queensland

30 June 2019
13:00

Brisbane Capitals 111, Logan Thunder 86

Auchenflower Stadium, Brisbane, Queensland

=== Round 11 ===
5 July 2019
20:00

Sunshine Coast Phoenix 83, Brisbane Capitals 103

Maroochydore Basketball Stadium, Sunshine Coast, Queensland

5 July 2019
20:30

Gold Coast Rollers 84, USC Rip City 88

Carrara Indoor Stadium, Gold Coast, Queensland

5 July 2019
20:30

Cairns Marlins 100, Rockhampton Rockets 77

Early Settler Stadium, Cairns, Queensland

6 July 2019
19:00

Logan Thunder 104, Gladstone Port City Power 90

Cornubia Park Sports Centre, Logan, Queensland

6 July 2019
19:00

North Gold Coast Seahawks 91, Ipswich Force 97

Runaway Bay Indoor Stadium, Gold Coast, Queensland

6 July 2019
20:00

Toowoomba Mountaineers 87, Rockhampton Rockets 106

Clive Berghofer Recreation Centre, Toowoomba, Queensland

6 July 2019
20:00

Southern Districts Spartans 101, Sunshine Coast Phoenix 107

Rowland Cowan Stadium, Brisbane, Queensland

6 July 2019
20:30

Mackay Meteors 70, Townsville Heat 105

McDonald's Mackay Stadium, Mackay, Queensland

7 July 2019
14:00

South West Metro Pirates 85, Rockhampton Rockets 115

Hibiscus Stadium, Brisbane, Queensland

=== Round 12 ===
12 July 2019
20:00

Sunshine Coast Phoenix 91, Cairns Marlins 109

Maroochydore Basketball Stadium, Sunshine Coast, Queensland

12 July 2019
20:00

USC Rip City 67, Townsville Heat 89

USC Sports Stadium, Sunshine Coast, Queensland

12 July 2019
20:30

Gold Coast Rollers 94, South West Metro Pirates 86

Carrara Indoor Stadium, Gold Coast, Queensland

13 July 2019
19:00

Logan Thunder 95, Gold Coast Rollers 103

Cornubia Parks Sports Centre, Logan, Queensland

13 July 2019
19:00

North Gold Coast Seahawks 106, Southern Districts Spartans 91

Runaway Bay Indoor Stadium, Gold Coast, Queensland

13 July 2019
19:30

Sunshine Coast Phoenix 91, Townsville Heat 79

Maroochydore Basketball Stadium, Sunshine Coast, Queensland

13 July 2019
19:30

USC Rip City 78, Cairns Marlins 80

USC Sports Stadium, Sunshine Coast, Queensland

13 July 2019
20:00

Toowoomba Mountaineers 92, Ipswich Force 116

Clive Berghofer Recreation Centre, Toowoomba, Queensland

14 July 2019
13:00

Brisbane Capitals 85, Townsville Heat 105

Auchenflower Stadium, Brisbane, Queensland

14 July 2019
14:00

South West Metro Pirates 82, North Gold Coast Seahawks 70

Hibiscus Stadium, Brisbane, Queensland

14 July 2019
16:00

Ipswich Force 102, Logan Thunder 109

Llewellyn Stadium, Ipswich, Queensland

=== Round 13 ===
19 July 2019
20:00

Rockhampton Rockets 115, Southern Districts Spartans 105

Adani Arena Rockhampton, Rockhampton, Queensland

19 July 2019
20:30

Townsville Heat 94, Logan Thunder 79

Townsville StarFM Stadium, Townsville, Queensland

20 July 2019
19:30

USC Rip City 98, Sunshine Coast Phoenix 82

USC Sports Stadium, Sunshine Coast, Queensland

20 July 2019
20:00

Gold Coast Rollers 115, Ipswich Force 81

Carrara Indoor Stadium, Gold Coast, Queensland

20 July 2019
20:00

Toowoomba Mountaineers 59, Brisbane Capitals 106

Clive Berghofer Recreation Centre, Toowoomba, Queensland

20 July 2019
20:00

Cairns Marlins 104, Logan Thunder 88

Early Settler Stadium, Cairns, Queensland

20 July 2019
20:00

Gladstone Port City Power 88, South West Metro Pirates 103

Kev Broome Stadium, Gladstone, Queensland

20 July 2019
20:00

Mackay Meteors 85, Southern Districts Spartans 75

McDonald's Mackay Stadium, Mackay, Queensland

=== Round 14 ===
26 July 2019
20:30

Cairns Marlins 97, Gladstone Port City Power 74

Early Settler Stadium, Cairns, Queensland

26 July 2019
20:30

Mackay Meteors 88, Brisbane Capitals 95

McDonald's Mackay Stadium, Mackay, Queensland

26 July 2019
20:30

USC Rip City 96, South West Metro Pirates 85

USC Sports Stadium, Sunshine Coast, Queensland

27 July 2019
19:00

Logan Thunder 71, Sunshine Coact Phoenix 77

Cornubia Park Sports Centre, Logan, Queensland

27 July 2019
19:30

USC Rip City 106, Ipswich Force 95

USC Sports Stadium, Sunshine Coast, Queensland

27 July 2019
20:00

Rockhampton Rockets 95, Brisbane Capitals 106

Adani Arena Rockhampton, Rockhampton, Queensland

27 July 2019
20:00

Gold Coast Rollers 110, Toowoomba Mountaineers 73

Carrara Indoor Stadium, Gold Coast, Queensland

27 July 2019
20:00

Southern Districts Spartans 100, North Gold Coast Seahawks 80

Rowland Cowan Stadium, Brisbane, Queensland

27 July 2019
20:00

Townsville Heat 101, Gladstone Port City Power 93

Townsville StarFM Stadium, Townsville, Queensland

28 July 2019
14:00

Toowoomba Mountaineers 90, South West Metro Pirates 106

Clie Berghofer Recreation Centre, Toowoomba, Queensland

=== Round 15 ===
2 August 2019
20:00

Toowoomba Mountaineers 96, Southern Districts Spartans 105

Clive Berghofer Recreation Centre, Toowoomba, Queensland

2 August 2019
20:30

Mackay Meteors 96, Rockhampton Rockets 113

McDonald's Mackay Stadium, Mackay, Queensland

3 August 2019
19:00

Brisbane Capitals 88, Sunshine Coast Phoenix 74

Auchenflower Stadium, Brisbane, Queensland

3 August 2019
19:00

Ipswich Force 92, Southern Districts Spartans 100

Llewellyn Stadium, Ipswich, Queensland

3 August 2019
19:00

North Gold Coast Seahawks 75, USC Rip City 91

Runaway Bay Indoor Stadium, Gold Coast, Queensland

3 August 2019
20:00

South West Metro Pirates 82, Logan Thunder 105

Hibiscus Stadium, Brisbane, Queensland

3 August 2019
20:00

Gladstone Port City Power 104, Gold Coast Rollers 114

Kev Broome Stadium, Gladstone, Queensland

3 August 2019
20:00

Townsville Heat 77, Rockhampton Rockets 104

Townsville StarFM Stadium, Townsville, Queensland
