= 2019 Queensland Basketball League women's regular season =

Queensland Basketball League
- Season: 2019
- Duration: 6 April – 31 August 2019
- Games played: 135
- Teams: 15

Regular season
- Top seed: Southern Districts Spartans

Statistical leaders
- Points: Anita Brown (26.11 ppg) (Mountaineers)
- Rebounds: Mikaela Ruef (19.63 rpg) (Thunder)
- Assists: Mikhaela Cann (9.73 apg) (Thunder)

Records
- Biggest home win: 40 points Spartans 104–64 Port City Power (5 May 2019)
- Biggest away win: 32 points Pirates 70–102 Force (22 June 2019)
- Highest scoring: 109 points Rip City 106–84 Mountaineers (29 June 2019); Port City Power 87–103 Pirates (20 July 2019)
- Winning streak: 14 games Southern Districts Spartans (27 April – 20 July 2019)
- Losing streak: 17 games Toowoomba Mountaineers (4 May – 2 August 2019)
- All statistics correct as of 5 November 2019.

The 2019 Queensland Basketball League season was the 34th and last season of competition since its establishment in 1979. A total of 30 teams contested the league. The regular season was played between 6 April and 3 August 2019, and the schedule was announced on 22 February 2019.

== Ladder ==
#	Team	Pld	W	L	Last 5	Streak	Home	Away	For	Against	%	Win %
1	Southern Districts Spartans	18	17	1	4-1	W3	9-0	8-1	1460	1190	122.69%	94.44%
2	Rockhampton Cyclones	18	14	4	3-2	L1	7-2	7-2	1432	1319	108.57%	77.78%
3	Townsville Flames	18	13	5	4-1	W2	7-2	6-3	1399	1301	107.53%	72.22%
4	Gold Coast Rollers	18	13	5	4-1	W3	6-3	7-2	1359	1249	108.81%	72.22%
5	Logan Thunder	18	12	6	3-2	L1	7-2	5-4	1447	1301	111.22%	66.67%
6	Mackay Meteorettes	18	11	7	3-2	L1	5-4	6-3	1358	1267	107.18%	61.11%
7	Ipswich Force	18	11	7	3-2	L3	5-4	6-3	1433	1329	107.83%	61.11%
8	North Gold Coast Seahawks	18	9	9	1-4	L2	5-4	4-5	1403	1319	106.37%	50.00%
9	USC Rip City	18	9	9	5-0	W5	7-2	2-7	1368	1358	100.74%	50.00%
10	Sunshine Coast Phoenix	18	8	10	2-3	W1	4-5	4-5	1361	1449	93.93%	44.44%
11	South West Metro Pirates	18	7	11	3-2	W2	2-7	5-4	1372	1436	95.54%	38.89%
12	Cairns Dolphins	18	5	13	0-5	L7	1-8	4-5	1248	1475	84.61%	27.78%
13	Gladstone Port City Power	18	3	15	0-5	L6	1-8	2-7	1325	1540	86.04%	16.67%
14	Brisbane Capitals	18	2	16	1-4	L3	0-9	2-7	1133	1364	83.06%	11.11%
15	Toowoomba Mountaineers	18	1	17	0-5	L17	0-9	1-8	1264	1465	86.28%	5.56%

=== Ladder Progression ===
- Numbers highlighted in green indicate that the team finished the round inside the top eight.
- Numbers highlighted in blue indicates the team finished first on the ladder in that round.
- Numbers highlighted in red indicates the team finished last place on the ladder in that round.

Team	1	2	3	4	5	6	7	8	9	10	11	12	13	14	15
Brisbane Capitals	9	12	14	15	15	15	15	15	15	15	14	14	14	14	14
Cairns Dolphins	8	11	13	14	14	12	12	12	12	12	12	12	12	12	12
Gladstone Port City Power	14	10	12	13	13	14	14	14	13	13	13	13	13	13	13
Gold Coast Rollers	13	9	11	11	11	11	8	6	9	4	4	5	5	5	4
Ipswich Force	11	14	7	7	7	8	7	5	3	3	3	4	6	7	7
Logan Thunder	4	3	8	5	4	2	6	8	7	6	5	6	4	3	5
Mackay Meteorettes	7	5	4	2	2	3	4	4	4	5	7	7	7	6	6
North Gold Coast Seahawks	2	2	1	4	6	6	5	7	5	8	8	8	8	8	8
Rockhampton Cyclones	1	1	3	3	3	4	2	2	2	2	2	2	2	2	2
South West Metro Pirates	10	6	5	9	9	7	10	10	10	10	10	11	11	11	11
Southern Districts Spartans	6	4	2	1	1	1	1	1	1	1	1	1	1	1	1
Sunshine Coast Phoenix	3	7	6	8	8	5	3	3	6	9	9	9	9	10	10
Toowoomba Mountaineers	5	8	10	12	12	13	13	13	14	14	15	15	15	15	15
Townsville Flames	–	13	9	6	5	9	9	9	8	7	6	3	3	4	3
USC Rip City	12	15	15	10	10	10	11	11	11	11	11	10	10	9	9

== Game log ==
=== Round 1 ===
26 April 2019
18:00

Gold Coast Rollers 43, Mackay Meteorettes 65

Carrara Indoor Stadium, Gold Coast, Queensland

26 April 2019
18:00

North Gold Coast Seahawks 82, Cairns Dolphins 46

Runaway Bay Indoor Stadium, Gold Coast, Queensland

27 April 2019
17:00

Logan Thunder 82, Mackay Meteorettes 62

Cornubia Park Sports Centre, Brisbane, Queensland

27 April 2019
17:30

Sunshine Coast Phoenix 85, USC Rip City 81

Maroochydore Basketball Stadium, Sunshine Coast, Queensland

27 April 2019
18:00

South West Metro Pirates 55, Toowoomba Mountaineers 62

Hibiscus Stadium, Brisbane, Queensland

27 April 2019
18:00

Glastone Port City Power 78, Rockhampton Cyclones 82

Kev Broome Stadium, Gladstone, Queensland

27 April 2019
18:00

Southern Districts Spartans 80, Cairns Dolphins 59

Rowland Cowan Stadium, Brisbane, Queensland

28 April 2019
12:00

Brisbane Capitals 62, Cairns Dolphins 64

Auchenflower Stadium, Brisbane, Queensland

28 April 2019
13:00

Gold Coast Rollers 61, Southern Districts Spartans 69

Carrara Indoor Stadium, Gold Coast, Queensland

28 April 2019
13:00

Ipswich Force 59, Mackay Meteorettes 73

Llewellyn Stadium, Ipswich, Queensland

=== Round 2 ===
3 May 2019
18:30

Cairns Dolphins 58, South West Metro Pirates 87

Early Settler Stadium, Cairns, Queensland

3 May 2019
18:30

Mackay Meteorettes 64, USC Rip City 54

McDonald's Mackay Stadium, Mackay, Queensland

4 May 2019
18:00

Rockhampton Cyclones 79, USC Rip City 73

Adani Arena Rockhampton, Rockhampton, Queensland

4 May 2019
18:00

Toowoomba Mountaineers 68, Gladstone Port City Power 77

Clive Berghofer Recreation Centre, Toowoomba, Queensland

4 May 2019
18:00

Townsville Flames 68, South West Metro Pirates 76

Townsville StarFM Stadium, Townsville, Queensland

4 May 2019
19:00

Brisbane Capitals 61, Gold Coast Rollers 76

Auchenflower Stadium, Brisbane, Queensland

5 May 2019
12:00

Southern Districts Spartans 104, Gladstone Port City Power 64

Rowland Cowan Stadium, Brisbane, Queensland

5 May 2019
13:00

North Gold Coast Seahawks 78, Sunshine Coast Phoenix 57

Runaway Bay Indoor Stadium, Gold Coast, Queensland

=== Round 3 ===
10 May 2019
18:30

Ipswich Force 100, Rockhampton Cyclones 75

Llewellyn Stadium, Ipswich, Queensland

11 May 2019
17:00

Logan Thunder 76, Rockhampton Cyclones 94

Cornubia Park Sports Centre, Brisbane, Queensland

11 May 2019
17:00

Ipswich Force 88, Mackay Meteorettes 77

Llewellyn Stadium, Ipswich, Queensland

11 May 2019
17:00

North Gold Coast Seahawks 81, Brisbane Capitals 55

Runaway Bay Indoor Stadium, Gold Coast, Queensland

11 May 2019
17:30

Sunshine Coast Phoenix 98, Toowoomba Mountaineers 80

Maroochydore Basketball Stadium, Sunshine Coast, Queensland

11 May 2019
18:00

Southern Districts Spartans 58, USC Rip City 50

Rowland Cowan Stadium, Brisbane, Queensland

11 April 2019
18:00

Townsville Flames 69, Cairns Dolphins 65

Townsville StarFM Stadium, Townsville, Queensland

12 May 2019
12:00

Gold Coast Rollers 61, Rockhampton Cyclones 80

Carrara Indoor Stadium, Gold Coast, Queensland

12 May 2019
12:00

South West Metro Pirates 80, Brisbane Capitals 46

Hibiscus Stadium, Brisbane, Queensland

12 May 2019
12:00

Mackay Meteorettes 88, Cairns Dolphins 57

McDonald's Mackay Stadium, Mackay, Queensland

=== Round 4 ===
17 May 2019
18:00

North Gold Coast Seahawks 82, Toowoomba Mountaineers 64

Runaway Bay Indoor Stadium, Gold Coast, Queensland

17 May 2019
18:00

USC Rip City 80, Brisbane Capitals 55

USC Sports Stadium, Sunshine Coast, Queensland

17 May 2019
18:30

Townsville Flames 87, Ipswich Force 77

Townsville StarFM Stadium, Townsville, Queensland

18 May 2019
17:00

Logan Thunder 91, South West Metro Pirates 75

Cornubia Park Sports Stadium, Brisbane, Queensland

18 May 2019
17:30

USC Rip City 88, North Gold Coast Seahawks 75

USC Sports Stadium, Sunshine Coast, Queensland

18 May 2019
18:00

Rockhampton Cyclones 65, Gladstone Port City Power 60

Adani Arena Rockhampton, Rockhampton, Queensland

18 May 2019
18:00

Toowoomba Mountaineers 44, Mackay Meteorettes 45

Clive Berghofer Recreation Centre, Toowoomba, Queensland

18 May 2019
18:00

Cairns Dolphins 77, Ipswich Force 95

Early Settler Stadium, Cairns, Queensland

18 May 2019
18:00

Southern Districts Spartans 67, Brisbane Capitals 49

Rowland Cowan Stadium, Brisbane, Queensland

19 May 2019
12:00

South West Metro Pirates 68, Mackay Meteorettes 82

Hibiscus Stadium, Brisbane, Queensland

19 May 2019
13:00

Sunshine Coast Phoenix 64, Southern Districts Spartans 73

Maroochydore Basketball Stadium, Sunshine Coast, Queensland

=== Round 5 ===
24 May 2019
18:00

North Gold Coast Seahawks 62, Logan Thunder 82

Runaway Bay Indoor Stadium, Gold Coast, Queensland

24 May 2019
18:30

Cairns Dolphins 67, Townsville Flames 81

Early Settler Stadium, Cairns, Queensland

24 May 2019
18:30

Mackay Meteorettes 100, Gladstone Port City Power 65

McDonald's Mackay Stadium, Mackay, Queensland

=== Round 6 ===
31 May 2019
18:00

Gold Coast Rollers 71, North Gold Coast Seahawks 62

Carrara Indoor Stadium, Gold Coast, Queensland

31 May 2019
18:30

Gladstone Port City Power 80, Sunshine Coast Phoenix 99

Kev Broome Stadium, Gladstone, Queensland

1 June 2019
17:00

Ipswich Force 70, South West Metro Pirates 77

Llewellyn Stadium, Ipswich, Queensland

1 June 2019
17:00

North Gold Coast Seahawks 83, Townsville Flames 60

Runaway Bay Indoor Stadium, Gold Coast, Queensland

1 June 2019
18:00

Rockhampton Cyclones 56, Cairns Dolphins 58

Runaway Bay Indoor Stadium, Gold Coast, Queensland

1 June 2019
18:00

Toowoomba Mountaineers 73, Logan Thunder 81

Clive Berghofer Recreation Centre, Toowoomba, Queensland

1 June 2019
18:00

Mackay Meteorettes 88, Sunshine Coast Phoenix 92

McDonald's Mackay Stadium, Mackay, Queensland

1 June 2019
19:00

Brisbane Capitals 72, USC Rip City 75

Auchenflower Stadium, Brisbane, Queensland

2 June 2019
12:00

Gladstone Port City Power 75, Cairns Dolphins 76

Kev Broome Stadium, Gladstone, Queensland

2 June 2019
13:00

Southern Districts Spartans 78, Townsville Flames 64

Rowland Cowan Stadium, Brisbane, Queensland

2 June 2019
14:00

Ipswich Force 74, Toowoomba Mountaineers 62

Llewellyn Stadium, Ipswich, Queensland

=== Round 7 ===
8 June 2019
18:00

Toowoomba Mountaineers 50, Gold Coast Rollers 69

Clive Berghofer Recreation Centre, Toowoomba, Queensland

8 June 2019
18:00

South West Metro Pirates 85, Sunshine Coast Phoenix 96

Hibiscus Stadium, Brisbane, Queensland

8 June 2019
18:00

Gladstone Port City Power 84, Townsville Flames 95

Kev Broome Stadium, Gladstone, Queensland

8 June 2019
18:00

Mackay Meteorettes 83, North Gold Coast Seahawks 97

McDonald's Mackay Stadium, Mackay, Queensland

8 June 2019
18:00

Southern Districts Spartans 78, Logan Thunder 70

Rowland Cowan Stadium, Brisbane, Queensland

9 June 2019
11:00

Rockhampton Cyclones 74, Townsville Flames 51

Adani Arena Rockhampton, Rockhampton, Queensland

9 June 2019
13:00

Gold Coast Rollers 78, Logan Thunder 70

Carrara Indoor Stadium, Gold Coast, Queensland

=== Round 8 ===
14 June 2019
18:30

Cairns Dolphins 101, Toowoomba Mountaineers 79

Early Settler Stadium, Cairns, Queensland

15 June 2019
17:00

Brisbane Capitals 58, Southern Districts Spartans 83

Auchenflower Stadium, Brisbane, Queensland

15 June 2019
17:00

Logan Thunder 81, Ipswich Force 83

Cornubia Park Sports Centre, Brisbane, Queensland

15 June 2019
17:30

Sunshine Coast Phoenix 87, USC Rip City 81

Maroochydore Basketball Stadium, Sunshine Coast, Queensland

15 June 2019
18:00

Rockhampton Cyclones 67, Mackay Meteorettes 62

Adani Arena Rockhampton, Rockhampton, Queensland

15 June 2019
18:00

South West Metro Pirates 68, Gold Coast Rollers 88

Hibiscus Stadium, Brisbane, Queensland

15 June 2019
18:00

Townsville Flames 84, Toowoomba Mountaineers 80

Townsville StarFM Stadium, Townsville, Queensland

16 June 2019
12:00

Gladstone Port City Power 73, Mackay Meteorettes 85

Kev Broome Stadium, Gladstone, Queensland

16 June 2019
14:00

Logan Thunder 85, USC Rip City 56

Cornubia Park Sports Centre, Logan, Queensland

16 June 2019
14:00

Sunshine Coast Phoenix 57, Ipswich Force 73

Maroochydore Basketball Stadium, Sunshine Coast, Queensland

=== Round 9 ===
21 June 2019
18:30

Gladstone Port City Power 85, USC Rip City 82

Kev Broome Stadium, Gladstone, Queensland

21 June 2019
18:30

Townsville Flames 73, Gold Coast Rollers 58

Townsville StarFM Stadium, Townsville, Queensland

22 June 2019
17:00

Brisbane Capitals 55, North Gold Coast Seahawks 67

Auchenflower Stadium, Brisbane, Queensland

22 June 2019
17:00

Logan Thunder 81, Toowoomba Mountaineers 63

Cornubia Park Sports Centre, Logan, Queensland

22 June 2019
18:00

Rockhampton Cyclones 81, Sunshine Coast Phoenix 70

Adani Arena Rockhampton, Rockhampton, Queensland

22 June 2019
18:00

Cairns Dolphins 61, Gold Coast Rollers 95

Early Settler Stadium, Cairns, Queensland

22 June 2019
18:00

South West Metro Pirates 70, Ipswich Force 102

Hibiscus Stadium, Brisbane, Queensland

23 June 2019
11:00

Brisbane Capitals 60, Gladstone Port City Power 75

Auchenflower Stadium, Brisbane, Queensland

23 June 2019
13:00

Southern Districts Spartan 87, South West Metro Pirates 65

Rowland Cowan Stadium, Brisbane, Queensland

=== Round 10 ===
28 June 2019
18:00

USC Rip City 75, Southern Districts Spartans 80

USC Sports Stadium, Sunshine Coast, Queensland

28 June 2019
18:30

Rockhampton Cyclones 87, North Gold Coast Seahawks 74

Adani Arena Rockhampton, Rockhampton, Queensland

28 June 2019
18:30

Ipswich Force 82, Gold Coast Rollers 83

Llewellyn Stadium, Ipswich, Queensland

28 June 2019
18:30

Townsville Flames 80, Mackay Meteorettes 74

Townsville StarFM Stadium, Townsville, Queensland

29 June 2019
17:00

Ipswich Force 61, Brisbane Capitals 59

Llewellyn Stadium, Ipswich, Queensland

29 June 2019
17:30

Sunshine Coast Phoenix 74, Gold Coast Rollers 84

Maroochydore Basketball Stadium, Sunshine Coast, Queensland

29 June 2019
17:30

USC Rip City 106, Toowoomba Mountaineers 84

USC Sports Stadium, Sunshine Coast, Queensland

29 June 2019
18:00

Cairns Dolphins 75, Mackay Meteorettes 88

Early Settler Stadium, Brisbane, Queensland

29 June 2019
18:00

Gladstone Port City Power 76, North Gold Coast Seahawks 107

Kev Broome Stadium, Gladstone, Queensland

30 June 2019
11:00

Brisbane Capitals 70, Logan Thunder 83

Auchenflower Stadium, Brisbane, Queensland

=== Round 11 ===
5 July 2019
18:00

Sunshine Coast Phoenix 69, Brisbane Capitals 85

Maroochydore Basketball Stadium, Sunshine Coast, Queensland

5 July 2019
18:30

Gold Coast Rollers 84, USC Rip City 75

Carrara Indoor Stadium, Gold Coast, Queensland

5 July 2019
18:30

Cairns Dolphins 89, Rockhampton Cyclones 108

Early Settler Stadium, Cairns, Queensland

6 July 2019
17:00

Logan Thunder 78, Gladstone Port City Power 61

Cornubia Park Sports Centre, Logan, Queensland

6 July 2019
17:00

North Gold Coast Seahawks 62, Ipswich Force 79

Runaway Bay Indoor Stadium, Gold Coast, Queensland

6 July 2019
18:00

Toowoomba Mountaineers 70, Rockhampton Cyclones 78

Clive Berghofer Recreation Centre, Toowoomba, Queensland

6 July 2019
18:30

Mackay Meteorettes 55, Townsville Flames 83

McDonald's Mackay Stadium, Mackay, Queensland

6 July 2019
18:00

Southern Districts Spartans 96, Sunshine Coast Phoenix 57

Rowland Cowan Stadium, Brisbane, Queensland

7 July 2019
12:00

South West Metro Pirates 76, Rockhampton Cyclones 93

Hibiscus Stadium, Brisbane, Queensland

=== Round 12 ===
12 July 2019
18:00

Sunshine Coast Phoenix 74, Cairns Dolphins 71

Maroochydore Basketball Stadium, Sunshine Coast, Queensland

12 July 2019
18:00

USC Rip City 69, Townsville Flames 84

USC Sports Stadium, Sunshine Coast, Queensland

12 July 2019
18:30

Gold Coast Rollers 71, South West Metro Pirates 66

Carrara Indoor Stadium, Gold Coast, Queensland

13 July 2019
17:00

Logan Thunder 70, Gold Coast Rollers 65

Cornubia Parks Sports Centre, Logan, Queensland

13 July 2019
17:00

North Gold Coast Seahawks 75, Southern Districts Spartans 85

Runaway Bay Indoor Stadium, Gold Coast, Queensland

13 July 2019
17:30

Sunshine Coast Phoenix 59, Townsville Flames 85

Maroochydore Basketball Stadium, Sunshine Coast, Queensland

13 July 2019
17:30

USC Rip City 97, Cairns Dolphins 79

USC Sports Stadium, Sunshine Coast, Queensland

13 July 2019
18:00

Toowoomba Mountaineers 67, Ipswich Force 72

Clive Berghofer Recreation Centre, Toowoomba, Queensland

14 July 2019
11:00

Brisbane Capitals 65, Townsville Flames 84

Auchenflower Stadium, Brisbane, Queensland

14 July 2019
12:00

South West Metro Pirates 74, North Gold Coast Seahawks 93

Hibiscus Stadium, Brisbane, Queensland

14 July 2019
14:00

Ipswich Force 86, Logan Thunder 76

Llewellyn Stadium, Ipswich, Queensland

=== Round 13 ===
19 July 2019
18:00

Rockhampton Cyclones 75, Southern Districts Spartans 91

Adani Arena Rockhampton, Rockhampton, Queensland

19 July 2019
18:30

Townsville Flames 70, Logan Thunder 83

Townsville StarFM Stadium, Townsville, Queensland

20 July 2019
17:30

USC Rip City 66, Sunshine Coast Phoenix 59

USC Sports Stadium, Sunshine Coast, Queensland

20 July 2019
18:00

Gold Coast Rollers 78, Ipswich Force 71

Carrara Indoor Stadium, Gold Coast, Queensland

20 July 2019
18:00

Toowoomba Mountaineers 77, Brisbane Capitals 79

Clive Berghofer Recreation Centre, Toowoomba, Queensland

20 July 2019
18:00

Cairns Dolphins 75, Logan Thunder 91

Early Settler Stadium, Cairns, Queensland

20 July 2019
18:00

Gladstone Port City Power 87, South West Metro Pirates 103

Kev Broome Stadium, Gladstone, Queensland

20 July 2019
18:00

Mackay Meteorettes 82, Southern Districts Spartans 80

McDonald's Mackay Stadium, Mackay, Queensland

=== Round 14 ===
26 July 2019
18:30

Cairns Dolphins 70, Gladstone Port City Power 68

Early Settler Stadium, Cairns, Queensland

26 July 2019
18:30

Mackay Meteorettes 81, Brisbane Capitals 67

McDonald's Mackay Stadium, Mackay, Queensland

26 July 2019
18:30

USC Rip City 77, South West Metro Pirates 74

USC Sports Stadium, Sunshine Coast, Queensland

27 July 2019
17:00

Logan Thunder 90, Sunshine Coact Phoenix 72

Cornubia Park Sports Centre, Logan, Queensland

27 July 2019
17:30

USC Rip City 82, Ipswich Force 77

USC Sports Stadium, Sunshine Coast, Queensland

27 July 2019
18:00

Rockhampton Cyclones 69, Brisbane Capitals 63

Adani Arena Rockhampton, Rockhampton, Queensland

27 July 2019
18:00

Gold Coast Rollers 102, Toowoomba Mountaineers 78

Carrara Indoor Stadium, Gold Coast, Queensland

27 July 2019
18:00

Southern Districts Spartans 88, North Gold Coast Seahawks 63

Rowland Cowan Stadium, Brisbane, Queensland

27 July 2019
18:00

Townsville Flames 86, Gladstone Port City Power 64

Townsville StarFM Stadium, Townsville, Queensland

28 July 2019
12:00

Toowoomba Mountaineers 88, South West Metro Pirates 95

Clie Berghofer Recreation Centre, Toowoomba, Queensland

=== Round 15 ===
2 August 2019
18:00

Toowoomba Mountaineers 75, Southern Districts Spartans 77

Clive Berghofer Recreation Centre, Toowoomba, Queensland

2 August 2019
18:30

Mackay Meteorettes 72, Rockhampton Cyclones 81

McDonald's Mackay Stadium, Mackay, Queensland

3 August 2019
17:00

Brisbane Capitals 72, Sunshine Coast Phoenix 92

Auchenflower Stadium, Brisbane, Queensland

3 August 2019
17:00

Ipswich Force 84, Southern Districts Spartans 86

Llewellyn Stadium, Ipswich, Queensland

3 August 2019
17:00

North Gold Coast Seahawks 79, USC Rip City 82

Runaway Bay Indoor Stadium, Gold Coast, Queensland

3 August 2019
18:00

South West Metro Pirates 78, Logan Thunder 77

Hibiscus Stadium, Brisbane, Queensland

3 August 2019
18:00

Gladstone Port City Power 76, Gold Coast Rollers 92

Kev Broome Stadium, Gladstone, Queensland

3 August 2019
18:00

Townsville Flames 95, Rockhampton Cyclones 90

Townsville StarFM Stadium, Townsville, Queensland
