= 2017 Queensland Basketball League season =

- League: Queensland Basketball League
- Sport: Basketball
- Duration: 28 April – 27 August
- Games: 17
- Teams: 14

Regular season
- Minor premiers: Brisbane Capitals
- Season MVP: Shaun Bruce (Mackay Meteors)
- Top scorer: Ray Willis (Gladstone Port City Power)

Finals
- Champions: Townsville Heat
- Runners-up: Mackay Meteors
- Grand Final MVP: Josh Wilcher

QBL seasons
- ← 2016 2018 →

The 2017 Men's Queensland Basketball League season was the 32nd running of the competition.

The teams for this season were: Brisbane Capitals, Brisbane Spartans, Cairns Marlins, Gladstone Port City Power, Gold Coast Rollers, Ipswich Force, Logan Thunder, Mackay Meteors, Rockhampton Rockets, South West Metro Pirates, Sunshine Coast Phoenix, Toowoomba Mountaineers, Townsville Heat and USC Rip City.

== Team information ==
Team	Home stadium	Head coach	Import	Import	Import
Brisbane Capitals	NAB Stadium	Geoff Tarrant	(United States) Aaron Anderson	(United States) Princeton Onwas	
Brisbane Spartans	Rowland Cowan Stadium	Ben Thompson			
Cairns Marlins	Early Settler Stadium	Jamie Pearlman			
Gladstone Port City Power	Kev Broome Stadium	Blair Smith	(United States) Willie Shackleford	(United States) Ray Willis	
Gold Coast Rollers	The Southport School	Pero Cameron	(United States) Torrey Craig	(United States) Thalo Green	(United States) Devon Sullivan
Ipswich Force	Cotton On Foundation Stadium	Mick Conlon	(United States) James Legan	(United States) Kyle Harvey	
Logan Thunder	Cornubia Park Sports Centre	Derek Rucker			
Mackay Meteors	Mackay Basketball Stadium	Cameron Tragardh			
Rockhampton Rockets	Hegvold Stadium	Neal Tweedy	(United States) Chris Fowler	(United States) Rashad Hassan	(Canada) David Wagner
South West Metro Pirates	Hibiscus Sports Complex	Mick Downer	(United States) Jeremy Kendle	(United States) Tanner McGrew	
Sunshine Coast Phoenix	Maroochydore Basketball Stadium	Brayden Heslehurst	(United States) Breland Hogan		
Toowoomba Mountaineers	USQ, Clive Berghofer Recreation Centre	Anthony Corcoran	(United States) Jalil Abdul-Bassit	(United States) Jay Washington	
Townsville Heat	Townsville 106.3fm Stadium	Rodney Anderson	(United Kingdom) Jamell Anderson	(United States) Justin Baker	
USC Rip City	USC Sports Stadium	Nathan Arousi	(United States) Lance Hurdle		

== Standings ==
#	Regular Season Standings			
#	Team	W	L	PCT
1	Brisbane Capitals	14	3	82
2	Mackay Meteors	14	3	82
3	Townsville Heat	12	5	71
4	Cairns Marlins	11	6	65
5	USC Rip City	11	6	65
6	South West Metro Pirates	11	6	65
7	Logan Thunder	9	8	53
8	Rockhampton Rockets	8	9	47
9	Brisbane Spartans	8	9	47
10	Gold Coast Rollers	6	11	35
11	Sunshine Coast Phoenix	5	12	29
12	Gladstone Port City Power	5	12	29
13	Ipswich Force	4	13	24
14	Toowoomba Mountaineers	4	13	24

=== Finals ===
Quarter-finals
1	Brisbane Capitals	91	X	X
8	Rockhampton Rockets	95	X	X
2	Mackay Meteors	93	X	X
7	Logan Thunder	83	X	X
3	Townsville Heat	92	X	X
6	South West Metro Pirates	89	X	X
4	Cairns Marlins	93	X	X
5	USC Rip City	76	X	X

Semi-finals
8	Rockhampton Rockets	90	X	X
2	Mackay Meteors	106	X	X
3	Townsville Heat	79	X	X
4	Cairns Marlins	77	X	X

Grand Final
Mackay Meteors	74	91	91
Townsville Heat	90	73	103

== Awards ==
=== Player of the Week ===
Round	Player	Team	Ref
1	Lucas Walker	Mackay Meteors	
2	Joshua Wilcher	Townsville Heat	
3	Torrey Craig	Gold Coast Rollers	
4	N/A (Note: Due to the Basketball Queensland Annual Conference and Awards events being held that weekend, Round 4 was a short round.)		
5	Lucas Walker	Mackay Meteors	
6	Isaih Tueta	USC Rip City	
7	Shaun Bruce	Mackay Meteors	
8	Michael Cedar	Logan Thunder	
9	Ray Willis	Gladstone Port City Power	
10	Tanner McGrew	South West Metro Pirates	
11	Ray Willis	Gladstone Port City Power	
12	Ray Willis	Gladstone Port City Power	
13	Rashad Hassan	Rockhampton Rockets	
14	Shaun Bruce	Mackay Meteors	
15	N/A	N/A	

=== Coach of the Month ===
Month	Coach	Team	Ref
May	N/A	N/A	
June	Mick Downer	South West Metro Pirates	
July	Rodney Anderson	Townsville Heat	

=== Statistics leaders ===
Category	Player	Team
Points per game	Ray Willis	Gladstone Port City Power
Rebounds per game	Tom Jervis	Brisbane Spartans
Assists per game	Shaun Bruce	Mackay Meteors
Steals per game	Aaron Anderson	Brisbane Capitals
Blocks per game	Tom Jervis	Brisbane Spartans
Field goal percentage	Keanu Post	Logan Thunder
3-pt field goal percentage	Isaih Tueta	USC Rip City
Free throw percentage	Chris Cedar	Mackay Meteors

=== Regular season ===
- Most Valuable Player: Shaun Bruce (Mackay Meteors)
- Coach of the Year: Cameron Tragardh (Mackay Meteors)
- U23 Youth Player of the Year: Matthew Kenyon (Sunshine Coast Phoenix)
- All-League Team:
  - G: Shaun Bruce (Mackay Meteors)
  - G: Ray Willis (Gladstone Port City Power)
  - F: Lucas Walker (Mackay Meteors)
  - F: Tanner McGrew (South West Metro Pirates)
  - C: Mitchell Young (Logan Thunder)

=== Finals ===
- Grand Final MVP: Josh Wilcher (Townsville Heat)
