= List of NBL1 North champions =

The champion teams of the NBL1 North, previously known as the Queensland Basketball League, are determined annually by a grand final championship weekend hosted by Basketball Queensland.

== Champions ==
=== Results by year ===
Year	Men's Champion	Result	Men's Runner-up	Women's Champion	Result	Women's Runner-up	Ref
1986	Townsville Suns		Ipswich Eagles	Brisbane Brewers		Mackay Meteorettes	
1987	Gold Coast Cougars		Townsville Suns	Mackay Meteorettes		Ipswich Eagles	
1988	Gold Coast Cougars		Townsville Suns	Brisbane Brewers		Mackay Meteorettes	
1989	Townsville Suns		Toowoomba Mountaineers	Brisbane Brewers		Townsville Sunbirds	
1990	Toowoomba Mountaineers		Townsville Suns	Brisbane Brewers		Mackay Meteorettes	
1991	Toowoomba Mountaineers		Brisbane Brewers	Brisbane Brewers		Townsville Sunbirds	
1992	Southern Districts Spartans		Townsville Heat	Brisbane Brewers		Townsville Sunbirds	
1993	Cairns Marlins		Burdekin Wildcats	Townsville Sunbirds		Southern Districts Spartans	
1994	Cairns Marlins		Southern Districts Spartans	Cairns Dolphins		Ipswich Eagles	
1995	Southern Districts Spartans		Rockhampton Rockets	Southern Districts Spartans		Mackay Meteorettes	
1996	Rockhampton Rockets		Southern Districts Spartans	Southern Districts Spartans		Townsville Sunbirds	
1997	Cairns Marlins		Suncoast Clippers	Townsville Sunbirds		Southern Districts Spartans	
1998	Cairns Marlins		Townsville Heat	Southern Districts Spartans		Townsville Sunbirds	
1999	Southern Districts Spartans		Cairns Marlins	Southern Districts Spartans		Townsville Sunbirds	
2000	Townsville Heat		Southern Districts Spartans	Southern Districts Spartans		Brisbane Brewers	
2001	Cairns Marlins		Brisbane Capitals	Brisbane Capitals		Townsville Sunbirds	
2002	Brisbane Capitals		Cairns Marlins	Brisbane Capitals		Southern Districts Spartans	
2003	South West Metro Pirates		Cairns Marlins	Southern Districts Spartans		Mackay Meteorettes	
2004	Cairns Marlins	103–94	Townsville Heat	Southern Districts Spartans	60–47	Townsville Flames	
2005	Southern Districts Spartans	90–85	Cairns Marlins	Southern Districts Spartans	71–55	Townsville Flames	
2006	Southern Districts Spartans	108–79	Rockhampton Rockets	Southern Districts Spartans	70–67	Cairns Dolphins	
2007	Cairns Marlins	135–94	Gold Coast Goannas	Townsville Flames	114–77	Maroochydore Clippers	
2008	Rockhampton Rockets	97–80	Townsville Heat	Townsville Flames	92-46	South West Metro Pirates	
2009	Cairns Marlins	113–81	Rockhampton Rockets	Gladstone Port City Power	102–98	South West Metro Pirates	
2010	Rockhampton Rockets		Mackay Meteors	Gladstone Port City Power		Northside Wizards	
2011	Mackay Meteors		Rockhampton Rockets	Gladstone Port City Power		Bundaberg Bears	
2012	Mackay Meteors		Rockhampton Rockets	Mackay Meteorettes		Gladstone Port City Power	
2013	Rockhampton Rockets		Brisbane Capitals	Mackay Meteorettes		Ipswich Force	
2014	Rockhampton Rockets		Mackay Meteors	Mackay Meteorettes		Rockhampton Cyclones	
2015	Mackay Meteors		Brisbane Capitals	Rockhampton Cyclones		Gladstone Port City Power	
2016	Cairns Marlins		Brisbane Capitals	Rockhampton Cyclones		Mackay Meteorettes	
2017	Townsville Heat	2 – 1 (90–74, 73–91, 103–91)	Mackay Meteors	Brisbane Spartans	2 – 0 (76–74, 70–66)	Mackay Meteorettes	
2018	Townsville Heat	2 – 0 (95–91, 84–80)	Cairns Marlins	Southern Districts Spartans	2 – 0 (76–63, 90–78)	Townsville Flames	
2019	Brisbane Capitals	2 – 0 (96–79, 112–61)	Gold Coast Rollers	Southern Districts Spartans	2 – 0 (82–64, 48–46)	Gold Coast Rollers	
2020	Season cancelled						
2021	Mackay Meteors	2 – 0 (81–78, 86–83)	Cairns Marlins	Logan Thunder	2 – 0 (75–71, 63–61)	Southern Districts Spartans	
2022	Gold Coast Rollers	2 – 0 (101–86, 118–71)	USC Rip City	Townsville Flames	2 – 0 (85–57, 80–48)	Logan Thunder	
2023	Ipswich Force	2 – 1 (86–100, 119–98, 109–85)	Gold Coast Rollers	Northside Wizards	2 – 0 (87–52, 70–59)	Rockhampton Cyclones	
2024	Mackay Meteors	2 – 0 (91–79, 102–80)	Brisbane Capitals	Rockhampton Cyclones	2 – 1 (71–80, 81–76, 80–59)	Northside Wizards	
2025	Southern Districts Spartans	2 – 0 (90–78, 93–88)	Brisbane Capitals	Logan Thunder	2 – 1 (69–87, 89–60, 78–76)	Southern Districts Spartans	
2026	Gold Coast Rollers	2 – 0 (118–85, 120–116)	Ipswich Force	Mackay Meteorettes	2 – 1 (107–78, 76–82, 120–87)	Townsville Flames	

=== Results by teams ===
Team	Total Titles	Men's		Women's		Notes
Team	Total Titles	Titles	Winning seasons	Titles	Winning seasons	Notes
Brisbane Spartans/Southern Districts Spartans	18	6	1992, 1995, 1999, 2005, 2006, 2025	12	1995, 1996, 1998, 1999, 2000, 2003, 2004, 2005, 2006, 2017, 2018, 2019	
Brisbane Brewers/Brisbane Capitals	10	2	2002, 2019	8	1986, 1988, 1989, 1990, 1991, 1992, 2001, 2002	Won the women's inaugural title in 1986.
Cairns Dolphins/Cairns Marlins	10	9	1993, 1994, 1997, 1998, 2001, 2004, 2007, 2009, 2016	1	1994	
Townsville Flames/Townsville Heat/Townsville Sunbirds/Townsville Suns	10	5	1986, 1989, 2000, 2017, 2018	5	1993, 1997, 2007, 2008, 2022	Won the men's inaugural title in 1986.
Mackay Meteorettes/Mackay Meteors	10	5	2011, 2012, 2015, 2021, 2024	5	1987, 2012, 2013, 2014, 2026	
Rockhampton Cyclones/Rockhampton Rockets	8	5	1996, 2008, 2010, 2013, 2014	3	2015, 2016, 2024	
Gold Coast Cougars/Gold Coast Rollers	4	4	1987, 1988, 2022, 2026	0		
Gladstone Port City Power	3	0		3	2009, 2010, 2011	
Toowoomba Mountaineers	2	2	1990, 1991	0		
Logan Thunder	2	0		2	2021, 2025	
South West Metro Pirates	1	1	2003	0		
Northside Wizards	1	0		1	2023	
Ipswich Force	1	1	2023	0		
