= Mikaela Ruef =

American basketball player (1990-)

- Ruef with Toulouse Métropole Basket in 2017

No. 33 – Tasmania Jewels
- Position: Forward
- League: WNBL

Personal information
- Born: 20 October 1990 (age 36) Dayton, Ohio, U.S.
- Listed height: 6 ft 3 in (1.91 m)

Career information
- High school: Beavercreek (Beavercreek, Ohio)
- College: Stanford (2009–2014)
- WNBA draft: 2014: 3rd round, 31st overall pick
- Drafted by: Seattle Storm
- Playing career: 2014–present

Career history
- 2014–2015: Sydney Uni Flames
- 2015–2016: Launceston Tornadoes
- 2015–2016: Adelaide Lightning
- 2016–2017: Canberra Capitals
- 2017: Hobart Chargers
- 2017–2018: Toulouse Métropole Basket
- 2019–2023: Logan Thunder
- 2020: Charnay Basket Bourgogne Sud
- 2020: Canberra Capitals
- 2021: Charnay Basket Bourgogne Sud
- 2021–2022: Canberra Capitals
- 2022–2024: Townsville Fire
- 2024: North Gold Coast Seahawks
- 2024–2025: Sydney Flames
- 2025: Cairns Dolphins
- 2026: Brisbane Capitals
- 2026–present: Tasmania Jewels

Career highlights
- WNBL champion (2023); NBL1 North champion (2021); QSL champion (2020); QBL Most Valuable Player (2019); QBL All-League Team (2019); All-SEABL Team (2015); SEABL Defensive Player of the Year (2015)
- Stats at Basketball Reference

Mikaela Ruef (born 20 October 1990) is an American-Australian professional basketball player for the Tasmania Jewels of the Women's National Basketball League (WNBL).

== Early life ==
Ruef was born in Dayton, Ohio. She attended Beavercreek High School in Beavercreek, Ohio.

== College career ==
Ruef played five years of college basketball for the Stanford Cardinal. She was part of Stanford's 2009–10 NCAA runner-up team as a freshman. In 2011–12, she appeared in three games before missing the rest of the season due to a foot injury. As a redshirt senior in 2013–14, she was named All-Pac-12 honorable mention.

== Professional career ==
=== WNBL and France ===
Ruef made her professional debut with the Sydney Uni Flames of the Women's National Basketball League (WNBL) in Australia during the 2014–15 season. She joined the Adelaide Lightning for the 2015–16 WNBL season, and the Canberra Capitals for the 2016–17 WNBL season.

For the 2017–18 season, Ruef played for Toulouse Métropole Basket in the French LF2. In 24 games, she averaged 17.5 points, 12.0 rebounds, 1.8 assists and 1.7 steals per game.

After not playing in 2018–19, Ruef joined the Capitals for the 2019–20 WNBL season, but was unable to play due to immigration delays and awaiting permanent residency. On 25 January 2020, after leaving Australia, Ruef had a one-game stint with Charnay Basket Bourgogne Sud of the LFB.

Ruef re-joined the Capitals for the 2020 WNBL Hub season in Queensland, playing 14 games. In January 2021, she re-joined Charnay for the rest of the 2020–21 season.

Ruef re-joined the Capitals for the 2021–22 WNBL season.

With the Townsville Fire during the 2022–23 WNBL season, she helped the team win the WNBL championship. She returned to the Fire for the 2023–24 WNBL season.

Ruef joined the Sydney Flames for the 2024–25 WNBL season. She played seven games to start the season but then missed the rest of the season due to injury.

On 21 October 2026, Ruef signed with the Tasmania Jewels as an injury replacement for Keely Froling. In November 2026, she played her 150th WNBL game.

=== Australian state leagues ===
In 2015, Ruef played for the Launceston Tornadoes of the South East Australian Basketball League (SEABL). She was All-SEABL Team and SEABL Defensive Player of the Year. In 23 games, he averaged 16.1 points, 15.0 rebounds and 3.2 assists per game. She returned to the Tornadoes for the 2016 season, averaging 16.0 points, 16.0 rebounds and 3.0 assists in 25 games. With the Hobart Chargers in the 2017 SEABL season, she averaged 15.1 points, 12.6 rebounds and 2.6 assists in 11 games.

Ruef joined the Logan Thunder of the Queensland Basketball League (QBL) for the 2019 season. She was named QBL Most Valuable Player and QBL All-League Team. In 2020, she played for the Thunder in the Queensland State League (QSL), where she led the team to the QSL championship. She played for the Thunder, now in the NBL1 North, in the 2021 NBL1 season. She helped the Thunder win the 2021 NBL1 North championship.

With the Thunder in the 2022 NBL1 season, Ruef averaged 20.1 rebounds per game and had three triple-doubles. She scored 50 points on 17 July. With the Thunder in the 2023 NBL1 season, Ruef averaged 22.6 rebounds per game. She had 13 games recording 20 rebounds or more, including a 35-rebound game. She recorded one triple-double for the season.

With the North Gold Coast Seahawks in the NBL1 North in the 2024 NBL1 season, Ruef averaged 21.3 rebounds per game. She had 11 games recording 20 rebounds or more, including a 33-rebound game. She recorded three triple-double for the season.

Ruef had a two-game stint with the Cairns Dolphins in the 2025 NBL1 North season. In the 2026 NBL1 North season, she had a three-game stint with the Brisbane Capitals.

== Stanford statistics ==
Legend
GP	Games played	GS	Games started	MPG	Minutes per game
FG%	Field goal percentage	3P%	3-point field goal percentage	FT%	Free throw percentage
RPG	Rebounds per game	APG	Assists per game	SPG	Steals per game
BPG	Blocks per game	PPG	Points per game	**Bold**	Career high

Year	Team	GP	Points	FG%	3P%	FT%	RPG	APG	SPG	BPG	PPG
2009-10	Stanford	23	19	40.0	12.5	40.0	0.7	0.3	-	-	0.8
2010-11	Stanford	34	72	40.6	16.7	52.0	2.9	1.4	0.4	0.3	2.1
2011-12	Stanford	3	0	-	-	-	2.3	0.3	0.3	-	0.0
2012-13	Stanford	36	151	40.9	8.3	52.8	6.6	2.2	0.5	**0.6**	4.2
2013-14	Stanford	**37**	**262**	**41.9**	**21.7**	**59.0**	**9.3**	**3.3**	**1.0**	0.4	**7.1**
Career Totals		133	504	41.0	16.4	55.4	5.3	1.9	0.5	0.3	3.8

== Personal life ==
In June 2026, Ruef gave birth to her first child.
