= Cameron Tragardh =

Australian basketball player (born 1983)

Personal information
- Born: 29 September 1983 (age 43) Brisbane, Queensland, Australia
- Listed height: 209 cm (6 ft 10 in)
- Listed weight: 111 kg (245 lb)

Career information
- High school: John Paul College (Brisbane, Queensland)
- College: Oral Roberts (2002–2003)
- NBA draft: 2004: undrafted
- Playing career: 2001–2018
- Position: Power forward
- Coaching career: 2013–2018

Career history

Playing
- 2001: Australian Institute of Sport
- 2002–2003: South West Metro Pirates
- 2003–2006: Townsville Crocodiles
- 2004: Townsville Heat
- 2005: Southern Districts Spartans
- 2006–2007: Rockhampton Rockets
- 2006: Brisbane Bullets
- 2007–2010: Wollongong Hawks
- 2008–2010: Northside Wizards
- 2010–2012: Melbourne Tigers
- 2011–2012: Eltham Wildcats
- 2012–2016: Cairns Taipans
- 2013; 2016: Cairns Marlins
- 2017–2018: Mackay Meteors

Coaching
- 2013: Cairns Marlins (assistant)
- 2017–2018: Mackay Meteors

Career highlights
- As player: All-NBL Second Team (2012); All-NBL Third Team (2010); NBL Best Sixth Man (2015); NBL Most Improved Player (2008); 3× QBL champion (2003, 2005, 2016); QBL Grand Final MVP (2016); 3× QBL MVP (2005, 2008, 2009); 5× QBL All-League Team (2004, 2007–2009, 2016); 2× QBL Youth Player of the Year (2002, 2004); As coach: QBL Coach of the Year (2017)

Cameron Tragardh (born 29 September 1983) is an Australian former professional basketball player who played 13 seasons in the National Basketball League (NBL). He made his debut in the NBL in 2003 and played for the Townsville Crocodiles, Brisbane Bullets, Wollongong Hawks, Melbourne Tigers, and Cairns Taipans across his career. He was named NBL Most Improved Player in 2008 and NBL Best Sixth Man in 2015. He was also named to the All-NBL Team twice.

Born and raised in Queensland, Tragardh was also a regular presence in the Queensland Basketball League (QBL), playing 13 seasons between 2002 and 2018. He won three QBL championships and three league MVPs. He was player-coach of the Mackay Meteors in 2017 and 2018, winning QBL Coach of the Year in 2017.

== Early life and career ==
Tragardh was born and raised in Brisbane, Queensland, where he attended John Paul College and ascended the junior basketball ranks at Southern Districts Spartans.

In 2001, Tragardh attended the Australian Institute of Sport (AIS) in Canberra, where he played for the AIS men's team in the South East Australian Basketball League.

In 2002, Tragardh played for the South West Metro Pirates in the Queensland Basketball League (QBL) and led the ABA nationally in scoring with 34 points per game. He was subsequently named QBL Youth Player of the Year. Following the QBL season, he moved to the United States to play college basketball for the Oral Roberts Golden Eagles. In 28 games during the 2002–03 season, he averaged 7.1 points and 2.9 rebounds per game. He returned to the South West Metro Pirates in 2003 and had a 47-point game during the season and helped the Pirates win the QBL championship.

== Professional career ==
=== NBL ===
In June 2003, Tragardh signed his first professional contract with the Townsville Crocodiles of the National Basketball League (NBL). In the final game of the 2003–04 season, he scored 24 points against the Hunter Pirates. He spent three seasons with the Crocodiles.

In August 2006, Tragardh signed with the Brisbane Bullets. He played in four games to start the 2006–07 NBL season as an injury replacement for Mark Bradtke. Bradtke's return saw Tragardh pushed to the training court for the remainder of the Bullets' championship-winning season.

In May 2007, Tragardh signed with the Wollongong Hawks. In October 2007, he had 30 points and a career-high 14 rebounds in a game against the Cairns Taipans. In the 2007–08 season, he was named the NBL Most Improved Player after increasing his scoring from 3.5 points in his first 84 games to averaging 17.6 points per game in 2008. In the 2009–10 season, he helped the Hawks reach the NBL Grand Final, where they lost 2–1 to the Perth Wildcats. Tragardh had 28 points in game two of the series. For the season, he was named to the All-NBL Third Team.

In April 2010, Tragardh signed with the Melbourne Tigers. The contract was reportedly a three-year deal worth in excess of $100,000 per season. In February 2011, he scored a career-high 35 points in a game against the New Zealand Breakers. In the 2011–12 season, he served as the Tigers' captain and was named to the All-NBL Second Team. He won the NBL Player of the Month award for December 2011 and the NBL Player of the Week for Round 13. Tragardh parted ways with the Tigers following the season.

In May 2012, Tragardh signed with the Cairns Taipans. He received the most fan votes for the 2012 NBL All-Star Game and started at centre for the North All-Stars. In the 2013–14 NBL season, Tragardh was among the Taipans' best until an ankle injury on New Year's Eve sidelined him for the rest of the season. In the 2014–15 season, he was named NBL Best Sixth Man and helped the Taipans win the minor premiership before losing to the New Zealand Breakers in the grand final series. Following the 2015–16 NBL season, Tragardh was released by the Taipans after 99 games for the club.

=== QBL and Big V ===
Tragardh played in the Queensland Basketball League (QBL) during the NBL off-seasons every year between 2004 and 2010. He played for the Townsville Heat (2004), Southern Districts Spartans (2005), Rockhampton Rockets (2006–07) and Northside Wizards (2008–10). He helped the Heat reach the grand final in 2004, won the championship with the Spartans in 2005, and helped the Rockets reach the grand final in 2006. He was named Youth Player of the Year for the second time in 2004 and then earned league MVP honours in 2005, 2008 and 2009. He was also named in the QBL All-League Team in 2004 and every year between 2007 and 2009. His 2009 QBL season saw him average 42 points per game as he scored 50 points or more in six games, including a 70-point game.

In the 2011 and 2012 off-seasons, Tragardh played in the Big V for the Eltham Wildcats. He helped the Wildcats reach the grand final in 2011, where they lost to the Waverley Falcons.

In 2013, Tragardh returned to the QBL as an assistant coach with the Cairns Marlins, later playing in seven games. He returned to the Marlins in 2016 as a player, helping them win the championship behind a Grand Final MVP performance. He was also named to the QBL All-League Team for the fourth time.

In 2017 and 2018, Tragardh served as player-coach of the Mackay Meteors. He was named QBL Coach of the Year in 2017 and helped the Meteors reach the grand final, where they lost to the Townsville Heat.

In 2020, Tragardh was named the third greatest QBL player of all time by The Courier-Mail.

== National team career ==
Tragardh was a member of the Australian team at the 2003 World University Games in Daegu, South Korea. In 2011, he toured internationally with the Australian Boomers.

== Post-playing career ==
In 2019, Tragardh served as Rockhampton Basketball's general manager.
