= 2019 Queensland Basketball League season =

Queensland Basketball League
- Season: 2019
- Duration: 6 April – 31 August 2019
- Games played: M: 135; W: 135
- Teams: M: 15; W: 15

Regular season
- Top seed: M: Brisbane Capitals; W: Southern Districts Spartans
- Season MVP: M: Jason Cadee (Brisbane Capitals); W: Mikaela Ruef (Logan Thunder)

Finals
- Champions: M: Brisbane Capitals (2nd championship); W: Southern Districts Spartans (12th championship)
- Runners-up: M: Gold Coast Rollers; W: Gold Coast Rollers

Statistical leaders
- Points: M: Kyle Harvey (29.22 ppg) (Ipswich); W: Anita Brown (26.11 ppg) (Mountaineers)
- Rebounds: M: Bryce Washington (14.63 rpg) (Mackay); W: Mikaela Ruef (19.63 rpg) (Thunder)
- Assists: M: Shaun Bruce (9.55 apg) (Rockhampton); W: Mikhaela Cann (9.73 apg) (Thunder)

Records
- Biggest home win: M: 51 points Capitals 119–68 Port City Power (23 June 2019); W: 40 points Spartans 104–64 Port City Power (5 May 2019)
- Biggest away win: M: 50 points Seahawks 55–105 Heat (1 June 2019); W: 32 points Pirates 70–102 Force (22 June 2019)
- Highest scoring: M: 220 points Rockets 115–105 Spartans (19 July 2019); W: 190 points Rip City 106–84 Mountaineers (29 June 2019); Port City Power 87–103 Pirates (20 July 2019)
- Winning streak: M: 13 games Brisbane Capitals (24 April – 5 July 2019); W: 14 games Southern Districts Spartans (27 April – 20 July 2019)
- Losing streak: M: 16 games Gladstone Port City Power (11 May – 3 August 2019); W: 17 games Toowoomba Mountaineers (4 May – 2 August 2019)
- All statistics correct as of 5 November 2019.

The 2019 QBL season was the 34th and last season of competition since its establishment in 1979. A total of 30 teams contested the league (15 men and 15 women teams). The regular season was played between 6 April and 3 August 2019, followed by a post-season involving the top eight of each gender in August 2019. The schedule was announced on 22 February 2019. The Brisbane Capitals won their second men's QBL title, whilst the Southern Districts Spartans successfully defended their women's QBL title. The Gold Coast Rollers reached both grand finals, however were unable to win either.

It was announced on October 30 that the 2019 QBL season was the last QBL season to be played, with the league merging with NBL1 for the 2020 season.

== Regular season ==
=== Men's regular season ===
==== Ladder ====
#	Team	Pld	W	L	Last 5	Streak	Home	Away	For	Against	%	Win %
1	Brisbane Capitals	18	17	1	4-1	W4	8-1	9-0	1810	1459	124.06%	94.44%
2	Gold Coast Rollers	18	15	3	5-0	W5	8-1	7-2	1740	1582	109.99%	83.33%
3	Townsville Heat	18	14	4	3-2	L1	8-1	6-3	1699	1518	111.92%	77.78%
4	Cairns Marlins	18	13	5	5-0	W6	8-1	5-4	1635	1458	112.14%	72.22%
5	Rockhampton Rockets	18	12	6	4-1	W2	6-3	6-3	1752	1638	106.96%	66.67%
6	Mackay Meteors	18	11	7	1-4	L2	6-3	5-4	1710	1643	104.08%	61.11%
7	USC Rip City	18	10	8	4-1	W4	5-4	5-4	1626	1636	99.39%	55.56%
8	Logan Thunder	18	9	9	2-3	W1	5-4	4-5	1741	1724	100.99%	50.00%
9	Sunshine Coast Phoenix	18	8	10	2-3	L1	4-5	4-5	1564	1628	96.07%	44.44%
10	South West Metro Pirates	18	7	11	2-3	L1	3-6	4-5	1654	1688	97.99%	38.89%
11	Southern Districts Spartans	18	7	11	3-2	W3	3-6	4-5	1727	1775	97.30%	38.89%
12	Ipswich Force	18	5	13	1-4	L4	2-7	3-6	1715	1808	94.86%	27.78%
13	North Gold Coast Seahawks	18	5	13	1-4	L3	3-6	2-7	1432	1638	87.42%	27.78%
14	Gladstone Port City Power	18	1	17	0-5	L16	0-9	1-8	1539	1828	84.19%	5.56%
15	Toowoomba Mountaineers	18	1	17	0-5	L12	1-8	0-9	1463	1784	82.01%	5.56%

=== Women's regular season ===
==== Ladder ====
#	Team	Pld	W	L	Last 5	Streak	Home	Away	For	Against	%	Win %
1	Southern Districts Spartans	18	17	1	4-1	W3	9-0	8-1	1460	1190	122.69%	94.44%
2	Rockhampton Cyclones	18	14	4	3-2	L1	7-2	7-2	1432	1319	108.57%	77.78%
3	Townsville Flames	18	13	5	4-1	W2	7-2	6-3	1399	1301	107.53%	72.22%
4	Gold Coast Rollers	18	13	5	4-1	W3	6-3	7-2	1359	1249	108.81%	72.22%
5	Logan Thunder	18	12	6	3-2	L1	7-2	5-4	1447	1301	111.22%	66.67%
6	Mackay Meteorettes	18	11	7	3-2	L1	5-4	6-3	1358	1267	107.18%	61.11%
7	Ipswich Force	18	11	7	3-2	L3	5-4	6-3	1433	1329	107.83%	61.11%
8	North Gold Coast Seahawks	18	9	9	1-4	L2	5-4	4-5	1403	1319	106.37%	50.00%
9	USC Rip City	18	9	9	5-0	W5	7-2	2-7	1368	1358	100.74%	50.00%
10	Sunshine Coast Phoenix	18	8	10	2-3	W1	4-5	4-5	1361	1449	93.93%	44.44%
11	South West Metro Pirates	18	7	11	3-2	W2	2-7	5-4	1372	1436	95.54%	38.89%
12	Cairns Dolphins	18	5	13	0-5	L7	1-8	4-5	1248	1475	84.61%	27.78%
13	Gladstone Port City Power	18	3	15	0-5	L6	1-8	2-7	1325	1540	86.04%	16.67%
14	Brisbane Capitals	18	2	16	1-4	L3	0-9	2-7	1133	1364	83.06%	11.11%
15	Toowoomba Mountaineers	18	1	17	0-5	L17	0-9	1-8	1264	1465	86.28%	5.56%

== Finals Series ==
The 2019 Queensland Basketball League Finals were played between 10 and 31 August 2019, consisting of two best-of-three semi-final and final series, where the higher seed hosted the first and third games. The Brisbane Capitals won the men's finals, and the Southern Districts Spartans won the women's finals.

=== Men's finals ===
Quarter-finals
1	Brisbane Capitals	109	X	X
8	Logan Thunder	78	X	X
4	Cairns Marlins	79	X	X
5	Rockhampton Rockets	90	X	X
2	Gold Coast Rollers	99	X	X
7	USC Rip City	91	X	X
3	Townsville Heat	80	X	X
6	Mackay Meteors	78	X	X

Semi-finals
1	Brisbane Capitals	105	X	X
5	Rockhampton Rockets	90	X	X
2	Gold Coast Rollers	77	X	X
3	Townsville Heat	58	X	X

Grand Final
Brisbane Capitals	96	112	X
Gold Coast Rollers	79	61	X

=== Women's finals ===
Quarter-finals
1	Southern Districts Spartans	85	X	X
8	USC Rip City	59	X	X
2	Rockhampton Cyclones	74	X	X
7	Ipswich Force	79	X	X
3	Townsville Flames	75	X	X
6	Mackay Meteorettes	64	X	X
4	Gold Coast Rollers	73	X	X
5	Logan Thunder	69	X	X

Semi-finals
1	Southern Districts Spartans	87	X	X
7	Ipswich Force	80	X	X
3	Townsville Flames	76	X	X
4	Gold Coast Rollers	77	X	X

Grand Final
Southern Districts Spartans	82	48	X
Gold Coast Rollers	64	46	X

== Season statistics leaders ==
=== Men's leaders ===
Category	Player	Games played	Totals	Average
Points per game	Kyle Harvey (Ipswich Force)	18	526	29.22
Rebounds per game	Bryce Washington (Mackay Meteors)	19	278	14.63
Assists per game	Shaun Bruce (Rockhampton Rockets)	20	191	9.55
Steals per game	Aaron Anderson (Brisbane Capitals)	22	57	2.59
Blocks per game	Will Magnay (Brisbane Capitals)	18	59	3.28
Three-point field goal percentage	Sean Carroll (Logan Thunder)	12	37-73	50.68%
Free throw percentage	Joshua Wilcher (Townsville Heat)	16	97-104	93.27%

=== Women's leaders ===
Category	Player	Games played	Totals	Average
Points per game	Anita Brown (Toowoomba Mountaineers)	18	470	26.11
Rebounds per game	Mikaela Ruef (Logan Thunder)	19	373	19.63
Assists per game	Mikhaela Cann (Logan Thunder)	11	107	9.73
Steals per game	Aja Parham-Ammar (Southern Districts Spartans)	20	68	3.40
Blocks per game	Sarah Ambrose (Gold Coast Rollers)	22	23	1.05
Three-point field goal percentage	Stephanie Bairstow (South West Metro Pirates)	14	30-52	57.69%
Free throw percentage	Caitlin Clancy (Sunshine Coast Phoenix)	18	57-68	83.82%

== Awards ==
=== Player of the Week ===
Round	Men's Division		Women's Division	
Round	Player	Team	Player	Team
1	Bryce Washington	Mackay Meteors	Deja Middleton	North Gold Coast Seahawks
2	Josh Derksen	Southern Districts Spartans	Mia Loyd	South West Metro Pirates
4	Jason Cadee	Brisbane Capitals	Mikhaela Cann	Logan Thunder
6	Spencer Parker	Gold Coast Rollers	Alexis Hyder	Sunshine Coast Phoenix
7	Henry Pwono	South West Metro Pirates	Mikaela Ruef	Logan Thunder
8	Mitchell Young	Logan Thunder	Angela Tomkins	Cairns Dolphins
9	Will Magnay	Brisbane Capitals	Leah Scott	Southern Districts Spartans
10	Jason Cadee	Brisbane Capitals	Abby Bishop	Townsville Flames
11	Shaun Bruce	Rockhampton Rockets	Mikaela Ruef	Logan Thunder
12	Josh Wilcher	Townsville Heat	Amanda Johnson	Ipswich Force
13	Will Magnay	Brisbane Capitals	Mikaela Ruef	Logan Thunder
14	Jason Cadee	Brisbane Capitals	Mikaela Ruef	Logan Thunder
15	Sean O'Mara	Rockhampton Rockets	Abby Bishop	Townsville Flames

=== Season ===
- Men's Most Valuable Player: Jason Cadee (Brisbane Capitals)
- Women's Most Valuable Player: Mikaela Ruef (Logan Thunder)
- Men's All-League Team:
  - Jason Cadee (Brisbane Capitals)
  - Spencer Parker (Gold Coast Rollers)
  - Kyle Harvey (Ipswich Force)
  - Bryce Washington (Mackay Meteors)
  - Will Magnay (Brisbane Capitals)
- Women's All-League Team:
  - Jessica Thomas (Rockhanpton Cyclones)
  - Aja Parham-Ammar (Southern Districts Spartans)
  - Leah Scott (Southern Districts Spartans)
  - Amanda Johnson (Ipswich Force)
  - Mikaela Ruef (Logan Thunder)
