= 2016 Queensland Basketball League season =

- League: Queensland Basketball League
- Sport: Basketball
- Duration: 29 April – 27 August
- Games: 17
- Teams: 14

Regular season
- Minor premiers: Townsville Heat
- Season MVP: Tanner McGrew (South West Metro Pirates)
- Top scorer: James Legan (Ipswich Force)

Finals
- Champions: Cairns Marlins
- Runners-up: Brisbane Capitals
- Grand Final MVP: Cameron Tragardh

QBL seasons
- ← 2015 2017 →

The 2016 Men's Queensland Basketball League season was the 31st running of the competition.

The teams for this season were: Brisbane Capitals, Bundaberg Bulls, Cairns Marlins, Gladstone Port City Power, Gold Coast Rollers, Ipswich Force, Logan Thunder, Mackay Meteors, Rockhampton Rockets, South West Metro Pirates, Sunshine Coast Phoenix Clippers, Sunshine Coast Rip, Toowoomba Mountaineers and Townsville Heat.

== Team information ==
| Team | Home stadium | Head coach | Import | Import |
|---|---|---|---|---|
| Brisbane Capitals | NAB Stadium | Geoff Tarrant | (United States) Aaron Anderson | |
| Bundaberg Bulls | WIN Stadium | Larry Daniels | (United States) Willie Shackleford | (United States) Scheraun King |
| Cairns Marlins | Early Settler Stadium | Jamie Pearlman | | |
| Gladstone Port City Power | Kev Broome Stadium | Blair Smith | (United States) Ray Willis | (United States) Marvin Williams |
| Gold Coast Rollers | The Southport School | Pero Cameron | (United States) Thalo Green | (United States) Lonnie Funderburke |
| Ipswich Force | Cotton On Foundation Stadium | Mick Conlon | (United States) James Legan | (United States) Kyle Harvey |
| Logan Thunder | Cornubia Park Sports Centre | Derek Rucker | (United States) Justin Baker | |
| Mackay Meteors | Candlestick Park | Ken Furdek | (New Zealand) Gareth Dawson | |
| Rockhampton Rockets | Hegvold Stadium | Neal Tweedy | (United States) Jordan Gregory | (United States) Ray Turner |
| South West Metro Pirates | Hibiscus Sports Complex | Nate Tate | (United States) Jason Conrad | (United States) Tanner McGrew |
| Sunshine Coast Phoenix Clippers | Maroochydore Basketball Stadium | Warrick Meehl | (United States) Eric McAlister | (United States) Lester Ferguson |
| Sunshine Coast Rip | USC Sports Stadium | Nathan Arousi | (United States) Lance Hurdle | (United States) Isaiah Harrison |
| Toowoomba Mountaineers | USQ, Clive Berghofer Recreation Centre | Anthony Corcoran | (United States) Erron Maxey | (United States) Chris Whitehead |
| Townsville Heat | Townsville Basketball Stadium | Rod Anderson | | |

== Standings ==
| # | Regular Season Standings | | | |
| # | Team | W | L | PCT |
|---|---|---|---|---|
| 1 | Townsville Heat | 14 | 3 | 82 |
| 2 | Brisbane Capitals | 13 | 4 | 76 |
| 3 | South West Metro Pirates | 12 | 5 | 71 |
| 4 | Logan Thunder | 12 | 5 | 71 |
| 5 | Cairns Marlins | 11 | 6 | 65 |
| 6 | Mackay Meteors | 11 | 6 | 65 |
| 7 | Rockhampton Rockets | 9 | 8 | 53 |
| 8 | Ipswich Force | 8 | 9 | 47 |
| 9 | Sunshine Coast Phoenix Clippers | 7 | 10 | 41 |
| 10 | Gladstone Port City Power | 7 | 10 | 41 |
| 11 | Sunshine Coast Rip | 5 | 12 | 29 |
| 12 | Gold Coast Rollers | 5 | 12 | 29 |
| 13 | Toowoomba Mountaineers | 3 | 14 | 18 |
| 14 | Bundaberg Bulls | 2 | 15 | 12 |

=== Finals ===
| # | Pool A |
| # | Team |
|---|---|
| 1 | Townsville Heat* |
| 5 | Cairns Marlins** |
| 6 | Mackay Meteors** |
| 7 | Rockhampton Rockets |
| 10 | Gladstone Port City Power |

| # | Pool B |
| # | Team |
|---|---|
| 2 | Brisbane Capitals** |
| 4 | Logan Thunder** |
| 9 | Sunshine Coast Phoenix Clippers |
| 11 | Sunshine Coast Rip |
| 14 | Bundaberg Bulls |

| # | Pool C |
| # | Team |
|---|---|
| 3 | South West Metro Pirates** |
| 8 | Ipswich Force** |
| 12 | Gold Coast Rollers |
| 13 | Toowoomba Mountaineers |

*The team that finishes 1st overall goes straight through to the semi-finals.

**The top two teams from each pool face-off in the quarter-finals.

- QF 1: 1st in Pool A vs. 2nd in Pool A
- QF 2: 1st in Pool B vs. 2nd in Pool C
- QF 3: 1st in Pool C vs. 2nd in Pool B

Quarter-finals
5 | Cairns Marlins | 99 | X | X
6 | Mackay Meteors | 82 | X | X
2 | Brisbane Capitals | 97 | X | X
8 | Ipswich Force | 85 | X | X
3 | South West Metro Pirates | 69 | X | X
4 | Logan Thunder | 85 | X | X

Semi-finals
1 | Townsville Heat | 79 | X | X
5 | Cairns Marlins | 96 | X | X
2 | Brisbane Capitals | 107 | X | X
4 | Logan Thunder | 84 | X | X

Grand Final
Cairns Marlins | 93 | 85 | X
Brisbane Capitals | 85 | 71 | X

== Awards ==
=== Player of the Week ===
| Round | Player | Team | Ref |
|---|---|---|---|
| 1 | Kurt Thompson | Brisbane Capitals | |
| 2 | Mitchell Young | Logan Thunder | |
| 3 | Ray Willis | Gladstone Port City Power | |
| 4 | Scheraun King | Bundaberg Bulls | |
| 5 | N/A (Note: Due to the Basketball Queensland Annual Conference and Awards events being held that weekend, Round 5 was a short round.) | | |
| 6 | Shaun Bruce | Mackay Meteors | |
| 7 | James Legan | Ipswich Force | |
| 8 | Jaryd Eustace | Ipswich Force | |
| 9 | Jordan Gregory | Rockhampton Rockets | |
| 10 | James Legan | Ipswich Force | |
| 11 | Tanner McGrew | South West Metro Pirates | |
| 12 | Michael Cedar | Logan Thunder | |
| 13 | Ray Willis | Gladstone Port City Power | |
| 14 | Aaron Anderson | Brisbane Capitals | |
| 15 | Tanner McGrew | South West Metro Pirates | |

=== Coach of the Month ===
| Month | Coach | Team | Ref |
|---|---|---|---|
| May | Rod Anderson | Townsville Heat | |
| June | Rod Anderson | Townsville Heat | |
| July | Jamie Pearlman | Cairns Marlins | |

=== Statistics leaders ===
Stats as of the end of the regular season

| Category | Player | Team | Stat |
|---|---|---|---|
| Points per game | James Legan | Ipswich Force | 30.1 |
| Rebounds per game | Tanner McGrew | South West Metro Pirates | 14.9 |
| Assists per game | Mitch Philp | Rockhampton Rockets | 7.0 |
| Steals per game | Aaron Anderson | Brisbane Capitals | 3.5 |
| Blocks per game | Nelson Kahler | Sunshine Coast Phoenix Clippers | 1.9 |
| Field goal percentage | Auryn Macmillan | Rockhampton Rockets | 62.6% |
| 3-pt field goal percentage | Zane Meehl | Sunshine Coast Phoenix Clippers | 53.7% |
| Free throw percentage | Alex Loughton | Cairns Marlins | 92.5% |

=== Regular season ===
- Most Valuable Player: Tanner McGrew (South West Metro Pirates)
- Coach of the Year: Rod Anderson (Townsville Heat)
- U23 Youth Player of the Year: Mirko Djeric (Townsville Heat)
- All-League Team:
  - G: Shaun Bruce (Mackay Meteors)
  - G: Ray Willis (Gladstone Port City Power)
  - F: Tanner McGrew (South West Metro Pirates)
  - F: Mitchell Young (Logan Thunder)
  - C: Cameron Tragardh (Cairns Marlins)

=== Finals ===
- Grand Final MVP: Cameron Tragardh (Cairns Marlins)
