= Matt Kenyon (basketball) =

Australian basketball player (born 1998)

No. 0 – Adelaide 36ers
- Position: Shooting guard
- League: NBL

Personal information
- Born: 8 February 1998 (age 28) Avoca Beach, New South Wales, Australia
- Listed height: 196 cm (6 ft 5 in)
- Listed weight: 91 kg (201 lb)

Career information
- High school: Hunter Sports (Newcastle, New South Wales)
- NBA draft: 2019: undrafted
- Playing career: 2016–present

Career history
- 2016: BA Centre of Excellence
- 2016–2018: Brisbane Bullets
- 2017: Sunshine Coast Phoenix
- 2019: Dandenong Rangers
- 2019–2020: Capital City Go-Go
- 2020: South Bay Lakers
- 2020: Central Coast Crusaders
- 2021: Ballarat Miners
- 2021–2023: Tasmania JackJumpers
- 2022: North-West Tasmania Thunder
- 2023: USC Rip City
- 2023–2025: South East Melbourne Phoenix
- 2024: North Gold Coast Seahawks
- 2025: Logan Thunder
- 2025–present: Adelaide 36ers
- 2026: Mandurah Magic

Career highlights
- NBL1 North All Star Second Team (2025); 2× NBL1 North Defensive Player of the Year (2023, 2025); QBL U23 Player of the Year (2017)

Matthew Dylan Kenyon (born 8 February 1998) is an Australian professional basketball player for the Adelaide 36ers of the National Basketball League (NBL). He debuted in the NBL in 2016 and played two seasons for the Brisbane Bullets before playing a season in the NBA G League. He returned to the NBL in 2021, playing two seasons with the Tasmania JackJumpers and then two seasons with the South East Melbourne Phoenix.

== Early life and career ==
Kenyon was born in Avoca Beach, New South Wales. He played for the Gosford City Rebels as a junior and represented New South Wales multiple times. He attended Hunter Sports High School in Newcastle, New South Wales.

In 2016, Kenyon played for the BA Centre of Excellence in the South East Australian Basketball League (SEABL). In 16 games, he averaged 10.8 points, 3.9 rebounds, 2.4 assists and 1.8 steals per game.

== Professional career ==
For the 2016–17 NBL season, Kenyon joined the Brisbane Bullets. He played 17 games in his first season.

For the 2017 QBL season, Kenyon joined the Sunshine Coast Phoenix. He averaged 12.2 points per game and was named the QBL's U23 Player of the Year.

Kenyon returned to the Bullets for the 2017–18 NBL season but was limited to four games. He suffered a dislocated knee towards the end of the season which saw him miss 12 months. He returned to action with the Dandenong Rangers of the NBL1 during the 2019 season, averaging 11.3 points in 17 games.

For the 2019–20 season, Kenyon moved to the United States, where he completed workouts with the Los Angeles Lakers, Los Angeles Clippers and Chicago Bulls. On 27 October 2019, Kenyon was drafted by the Capital City Go-Go with the 19th overall pick in the NBA G League Draft and was included in the team's training camp roster. He was waived by the Capital City Go-Go on 22 January 2020, and was subsequently picked up by the South Bay Lakers on 7 February 2020. In 18 games across the two teams, he averaged 1.3 points and 1.9 rebounds per game.

Kenyon returned to Australia and played for the Central Coast Crusaders during the 2020 Waratah League season. He then played for the Ballarat Miners of the NBL1 South during the 2021 NBL1 season.

For the 2021–22 NBL season, Kenyon joined the inaugural roster of the Tasmania JackJumpers. Following the NBL season, he played for the North-West Tasmania Thunder in the 2022 NBL1 South season.

Kenyon re-joined the JackJumpers for the 2022–23 NBL season. He was ruled out for four-to-six weeks in mid November with a calf injury.

On 2 March 2023, Kenyon signed with the USC Rip City of the NBL1 North for the 2023 season. He was named NBL1 North Defensive Player of the Year.

On 17 April 2023, Kenyon signed a two-year deal with the South East Melbourne Phoenix. Following the 2023–24 NBL season, he joined the North Gold Coast Seahawks for the 2024 NBL1 North season. After averaging 5.9 points and 5.1 rebounds per game across in 2023–24, he had a more limited role with the Phoenix in the 2024–25 NBL season. Following the 2024–25 season, he joined the Logan Thunder for the 2025 NBL1 North season. He was named NBL1 North Defensive Player of the Year and NBL1 North All Star Second Team.

On 15 May 2025, Kenyon signed with the Adelaide 36ers for the 2025–26 NBL season.

Kenyon joined the Mandurah Magic of the NBL1 West for the 2026 season.

On 19 June 2026, Kenyon re-signed with the 36ers for the 2026–27 NBL season.

== National team career ==
In June 2017, Kenyon was selected in the Australian Emerging Boomers squad for the Summer Universiade in Taipei.

In February 2021, Kenyon was selected to play for Australia in the 2021 FIBA Asia Cup qualification against New Zealand. Australia won the game 81–52 and Kenyon helped contribute with 6 points, 10 rebounds and 2 assists.
