= Brad Williamson (basketball) =

Australian basketball player

Personal information
- Born: 27 June 1981 (age 45) Brisbane, Queensland, Australia
- Listed height: 197 cm (6 ft 6 in)
- Listed weight: 95 kg (209 lb)

Career information
- Playing career: 1998–2017
- Position: Small forward / shooting guard

Career history
- 1998–2003: Maroochydore Clippers
- 2003–2008: Brisbane Bullets
- 2004: Brisbane Capitals
- 2005–2008: Southern Districts Spartans
- 2008–2011: Townsville Crocodiles
- 2010: Caboolture Suns
- 2011: Ipswich Force
- 2012–2015: Rockhampton Rockets
- 2017: Sunshine Coast Phoenix

Career highlights
- NBL champion (2007); 4× QBL champion (2005, 2006, 2013, 2014)

Bradley Williamson (born 27 June 1981) is an Australian former professional basketball player.

== Early life ==
Williamson was born in Brisbane, Queensland.

== Playing career ==
=== NBL ===
Williamson debuted in the National Basketball League (NBL) with the Brisbane Bullets in the 2003–04 season. In November 2006 against the Singapore Slingers, he scored a career-high 30 points with 9-of-12 three-pointers. He had a 24-point final quarter that included 19 points in the final three minutes. He went on to help the Bullets win the NBL championship for the 2006–07 season. He averaged a career-best 8.1 points in the 2007–08 NBL season.

In 2008, Williamson joined the Townsville Crocodiles. He played three seasons for the Crocodiles, with his final NBL season coming in 2010–11.

=== QBL and SEABL ===
Williamson played six seasons for the Maroochydore Clippers from 1998 to 2003. During that time, the Clippers played in the Queensland Basketball League (QBL) (1998; 2002–2003) and the Southern Cross Conference (SCC) (1999–2001). He helped the Clippers win the 1999 SCC title and was Club MVP every year between 1999 and 2003. He averaged a league-leading 4.13 steals per game in 2003 and earned QBL co-MVP and co-Youth Player of the Year honours.

After a season with the Brisbane Capitals in 2004, Williamson played for the Southern Districts Spartans between 2005 and 2008. The Spartans played in the QBL in 2005 and 2006 before moving to the South East Australian Basketball League (SEABL), where Williamson played in 2007 and 2008. He returned to the QBL in 2010 with the Caboolture Suns. After a season with the Ipswich Force in 2011, he played for the Rockhampton Rockets between 2012 and 2015. He helped the Rockets win back-to-back QBL championships in 2013 and 2014.

Williamson's final stint in the QBL came in 2017 with the Sunshine Coast Phoenix.

== Personal life ==
Williamson's father, Jeff, and brother, Leon, both played for the Maroochydore Clippers.
