= Cairns Marlins =

- League: NBL1 North
- Founded: 1987
- History: Cairns Marlins; 1987–present
- Arena: Trinity Ford Stadium
- Capacity: 730
- Location: Cairns, Queensland
- Team colors: Deep sky blue, orange, white
- President: Chris Van Dorssen
- General manager: Luca Vergari
- Ownership: Cairns Basketball Inc.
- Affiliations: Cairns Taipans; Cairns Dolphins
- Championships: 9 (1993, 1994, 1997, 1998, 2001, 2004, 2007, 2009, 2016)
- Website: NBL1.com.au
Home	Away

The Cairns Marlins are an Australian basketball team based in Cairns, Queensland. The Marlins compete in the men's NBL1 North and play their home games at Early Settler Stadium. The team is affiliated with Cairns Basketball Inc. (CBI), the major administrative basketball organisation in the region. CBI's women's team is the Cairns Dolphins.

== Team history ==
=== Entry into the QBL ===
After operating a successful basketball program in Cairns, Queensland, Cairns Basketball joined the Queensland State Basketball League in its second season in 1987. They fielded two teams, the Cairns Marlins in the men's competition and the Cairns Dolphins in the women's competition.

=== Expansion to the NBL ===
Between 1993 and 1998 the Marlins won four championships, prompting calls for Cairns to join the Australian National Basketball League. The Cairns Taipans joined the NBL for the 1999–2000 season, with Marlin's head coach Rod Popp coaching the team.

Since the Taipans' entry into the NBL the two teams have remained very close, often sharing development and training players over the NBL off-season and the QBL season.

=== Championship dynasty ===
The Marlins are the most successful team in the QBL, holding nine championships since the team joined the league. They also make regular appearances in the playoffs, making 19 appearances over 26 seasons since 1993.

=== Transfer to NBL1 ===
After a successful first season in 2019, in 2020 the NBL1 expanded into Queensland and replaced the QBL. After this change, the Marlins transferred to the NBL1 North.

In the 2026 NBL1 North season, the Marlins finished the regular season with a 16–0 record, becoming the first NBL1 Men's side to go undefeated in a regular season. They went on to lose to the Ipswich Force in the semi-final.

== Season by season ==
Season	League	Regular Season					Post-Season	Head coach	Captain	Club MVP
Season	League	Position	Played	Wins	Losses	Win %	Post-Season	Head coach	Captain	Club MVP
Cairns Marlins
1987	QSBL									
1988	QSBL									
1989	QSBL									
1990	QSBL							David Ingram		
1991	QSBL							Peter Pendle		
1992	QSBL			4	22			Brian Vincent		
1993	QSBL			16	8		Champions in Final against Burdekin Wildcats	Rod Popp	Alan Christie	
1994	CBA	1st		27	4		Lost in Final to Ballarat Miners	Rod Popp	Ben Johnson	
1995	CBA			15	9			Rod Popp	Ben Johnson	
1996	CBA			16	8			Rod Popp	Billy Ross	
1997	CBA			24	2		Lost in Final to Suncoast Clippers	Rod Popp		
1998	ABA			34	2		Champions in Final against Townsville Heat	Rod Popp	Lucas Agrums	
1999	ABA						Lost in Final to Southern Districts	Rod Popp		
2000	ABA	6th	18	7	11	.388		Mark Beecroft		
2001	ABA						Champions in Final against Brisbane Capitals	Mark Beecroft		
2002	ABA	2nd	20	14	6	.700	Lost in Final to Brisbane Capitals	Mark Beecroft		
2003	ABA	1st	20	15	5	.750	Lost in Final to South West Metro Pirates	Mark Beecroft		
2004	ABA						Champions in Final against Townsville Heat, 103–94	Mark Beecroft		
2005	ABA	1st	18	15	3	.833	Lost in Final to Southern Districts Spartans, 90–85	Mark Beecroft		
2006	QABL							Aaron Fearne		
2007	QABL						Champions in Final against Gold Coast Goannas, 135–94	Aaron Fearne		
2008	QABL							Aaron Fearne		
2009	QBL						Champions in Final against Rockhampton Rockets, 113–81	Aaron Fearne		
2010	QBL	4th	18	12	6	.667	Did not qualify			
2011	QBL	7th	18	10	8	.556	Did not qualify			
2012	QBL	4th	16	11	5	.688	Lost in Elimination Finals to Mackay Meteors, 106–75			
2013	QBL	2nd	16	14	2	.875	Lost in Elimination-finals to Townsville Heat, 86–99	Jamie Pearlman		
2014	QBL	3rd	16	13	3	.813	Lost in Elimination-finals to Mackay Meteors, 83–63	Jamie Pearlman		
2015	QBL	7th	17	10	7	.588	Did not qualify	Jamie Pearlman	James Mitchell	
2016	QBL	5th	17	11	6	.647	Champions in Final against Brisbane Capitals, 2–0	Jamie Pearlman	James Mitchell	Damon Heuir
2017	QBL	4th	17	11	6	.647	Lost in Semi-finals to Townsville Heat, 79–77	Jamie Pearlman		Damon Heuir
2018	QBL	6th	18	10	8	.556	Lost in Final to Townsville Heat, 2–0	Jamie O'Loughlin		Anthony Fisher
2019	QBL	4th	18	13	5	.722	Lost in Elimination-finals to Rockhampton Rockets, 79-90	Jamie O'Loughlin	Anthony Fisher	
2020	NBL1 North	Season cancelled								
2021	NBL1 North	5th	13	7	6	.538	Lost in Grand Final to Mackay Meteors, 2–0	Kerry Williams	Anthony Fisher	

== Current squad ==
Cairns Marlins roster
Players
Coaches

Pos.	No.	Nat.	Name	Ht.	Wt.
G	3	(Australia)	George, Deba	1.83 m (6 ft 0 in)
G	4	(Australia)	Ahwang, Curt
G	5	(Australia)	Đerić, Mirko	1.88 m (6 ft 2 in)	82 kg (181 lb)
G	7	(Australia)	Fisher, Anthony (C)	1.87 m (6 ft 2 in)	78 kg (172 lb)
G	10	(Australia)	Stattmann, Ky	1.90 m (6 ft 3 in)
F	12	(Australia)	Ware, Marshall	1.92 m (6 ft 4 in)
F	13	(Australia)	Deng, Majok	2.08 m (6 ft 10 in)	84 kg (185 lb)
F	14	(Papua New Guinea)	Farmer, Aron	1.97 m (6 ft 6 in)
C	15	(Australia)	Jawai, Nathan	2.09 m (6 ft 10 in)	140 kg (309 lb)
G	20	(Australia)	Hutchinson, Tysei	1.90 m (6 ft 3 in)	82 kg (181 lb)
F	21	(Australia)	Gamble, Nick	2.00 m (6 ft 7 in)	83 kg (183 lb)
C	23	(Australia)	Ellis, Sam
G	31	(Australia)	Beecroft, Jaylon	1.77 m (5 ft 10 in)

Head coach

- (Australia) Kerry Williams

Assistant coach(es)

- TBA

Legend

- (C) Team captain
- (IN) Inactive
- (I) Import player
- Injured

- Roster
Updated: 19 June 2021
