= Logan Thunder =

Logan Thunder may refer to:

- Logan Thunder (WNBL), Women's National Basketball League team
- Logan Thunder (QBL), Queensland Basketball League club
