= Living color =

Living color or colour could refer to

- Living Colour, an American rock band
- In Living Color, American sketch comedy television series that was produced in the early 1990s
- "in living color", part of NBC's slogan during the introduction of its peacock logo in the late 1950s
- Living Color (film), a 1992 Australian movie
- Television's Greatest Hits: In Living Color , part of TVT Records's Television's Greatest Hits series
