= Bryce Washington =

Bryce Washington may refer to:

- Bryce Washington (basketball) (born 1996), American basketball player
- Bryce Washington (soccer) (born 1998), American soccer player
