= Lucas Walker =

Australian basketball player (born 1984)

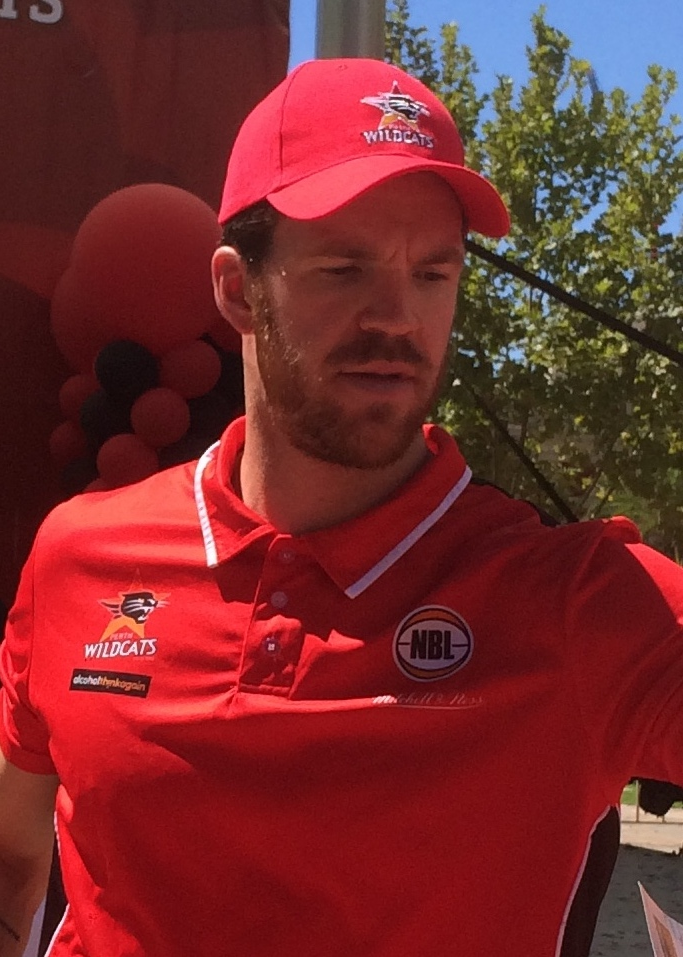
- Walker with the Perth Wildcats in 2017

Sutherland Sharks
- Position: Forward
- League: NBL1 East

Personal information
- Born: 6 December 1984 (age 41) Launceston, Tasmania, Australia
- Listed height: 202 cm (6 ft 8 in)
- Listed weight: 102 kg (225 lb)

Career information
- High school: Riverside (Launceston, Tasmania); Launceston College (Launceston, Tasmania)
- College: Montana State–Billings (2004–2006); Saint Mary's (2007–2009)
- NBA draft: 2009: undrafted
- Playing career: 2002–present

Career history
- 2002: Launceston Tigers
- 2003: North-West Tasmania Thunder
- 2004: Australian Institute of Sport
- 2010: Dandenong Rangers
- 2010–2015: Melbourne Tigers/United
- 2013: Ballarat Miners
- 2015–2016: Dandenong Rangers
- 2015–2016: Adelaide 36ers
- 2016–2018: Perth Wildcats
- 2017: Mackay Meteors
- 2018: Frankston Blues
- 2018–2019: Cairns Taipans
- 2019: Nunawading Spectres
- 2019–2020: Sydney Kings
- 2022–2023: Illawarra Hawks
- 2026–present: Sutherland Sharks

Career highlights
- NBL1 champion (2019); NBL champion (2017); QBL All-League Team (2017); Pacific West Freshman of the Year (2005)
Medals
Representing Australia
Men's basketball
Commonwealth Games
Gold medal – first place	2018 Gold Coast	Team competition

Lucas Benson Walker (born 6 December 1984) is an Australian basketball player for the Sutherland Sharks of the NBL1 East. He played 10 seasons in the National Basketball League (NBL) between 2010 and 2020. He played college basketball for Montana State University Billings and Saint Mary's College of California before joining the Melbourne Tigers in 2010. After five seasons with Melbourne, he had stints with the Adelaide 36ers, Perth Wildcats, Cairns Taipans and Sydney Kings. He won an NBL championship with the Wildcats in 2017.

== Early life and career ==
Walker was born in Launceston, Tasmania, where he attended West Launceston Primary School, Riverside High School and Launceston College. He debuted in the South East Australian Basketball League (SEABL) in 2002 with the Launceston Tigers before joining the North-West Tasmania Thunder for the 2003 SEABL season. In 2004, he attended the Australian Institute of Sport (AIS) in Canberra, where he played for the AIS men's team in the SEABL.

== College career ==
Walker moved to the United States to attend Montana State University Billings, where as a freshman in 2004–05, he was named the Pacific West Conference Freshman of the Year after averaging 15.5 points and 5.8 rebounds in 20 games (17 starts). As a sophomore in 2005–06, he averaged 11.8 points and 5.5 rebounds in 22 games (17 starts).

In 2006, Walker transferred to Saint Mary's College of California. After redshirting the 2006–07 season due to NCAA transfer rules, he appeared in 25 games off the bench for the Gaels in 2007–08, averaging 3.2 points and 2.4 rebounds per game in 9.3 minutes per game. As a senior in 2008–09, he played 25 games (8 starts) and averaged 2.7 points and 1.6 rebounds per game.

== Professional career ==
Upon returning to Australia, Walker played for the Dandenong Rangers during the 2010 SEABL season before joining the Melbourne Tigers for the 2010–11 NBL season. He played four seasons with the Tigers and then continued with the franchise when it was rebranded to Melbourne United in 2014. In 131 games between 2010–11 and 2014–15, he averaged 5.1 points and 3.9 rebounds per game. During this time, he played the 2013 SEABL with the Ballarat Miners, and the 2015 SEABL season with the Dandenong Rangers.

For the 2015–16 NBL season, Walker played for the Adelaide 36ers. For the 2016 SEABL season, he returned to the Rangers.

After having a pre-season stint with the Brisbane Bullets, Walker joined the Perth Wildcats in September 2016 as an injury replacement for Matthew Knight. On 20 October 2016, after Knight was given the all-clear to return to action, Walker was removed from the active 11-man playing roster. Despite being unable to return to the court for the Wildcats for the remainder of the 2016–17 season, Walker remained a training player, was a member of the championship-winning team, and was named the recipient of the Club Coaches' Award. After playing in the Queensland Basketball League with the Mackay Meteors during the 2017 off-season, Walker re-joined the Wildcats for the 2017–18 season as a full-time player. On 8 December 2017, Walker had 12 points and 16 rebounds in an 88–79 win over the Adelaide 36ers. Twelve of his 16 rebounds were offensive, the most ever recorded in the NBL's 40-minute era.

After a short off-season stint with the Frankston Blues in the SEABL, Walker joined the Cairns Taipans for the 2018–19 NBL season. Following the season, the Taipans cut ties with Walker. In April 2019, Walker joined the Nunawading Spectres of the NBL1 for the 2019 season. He helped the Spectres win the NBL1 championship.

On 2 September 2019, Walker signed with the Sydney Kings for the 2019–20 NBL season.

Walker announced his retirement from the NBL on 1 February 2021.

Walker joined the Illawarra Hawks of the NBL1 East for the 2022 NBL1 season. He returned to the Hawks for the 2023 NBL1 East season.

After a two-year absence, Walker joined the Sutherland Sharks for the 2026 NBL1 East season. He played just under eight minutes during the Sharks' 2026 NBL1 East Grand Final appearance.

== National team career ==
In 2014, Walker played for the Australian Boomers in the Sino-Australia Challenge series against China. He played for the Boomers at the 2018 Commonwealth Games and during the 2019 FIBA Basketball World Cup Asian qualifiers.

Walker helped the Australia 3x3 team win silver at the 2023 FIBA 3x3 Asia Cup and then competed at the 2023 FIBA 3x3 World Cup.

== Personal life ==
Walker is the son of Robert and Sharyn, and has a sister named Ashleigh.
