= Derek Rucker =

American-Australian basketball player

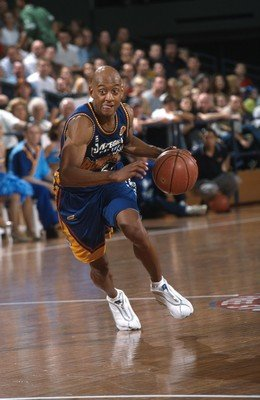

Personal information
- Born: October 2, 1966 (age 60) Washington, D.C., U.S.
- Listed height: 184 cm (6 ft 0 in)
- Listed weight: 77 kg (170 lb)

Career information
- High school: University School (Hunting Valley, Ohio)
- College: Davidson (1984–1988)
- NBA draft: 1988: undrafted
- Playing career: 1990–2006, 2014
- Position: Point guard

Career history

Playing
- 1990–1991: Brisbane Bullets
- 1992–1993: Birmingham Bullets
- 1994: Newcastle Falcons
- 1995–1998: Townsville Suns
- 1996–1997: Ginebra San Miguel
- 1998–2003: West Sydney Razorbacks
- 2003–2006: Brisbane Bullets
- 2014: Gladstone Port City Power

Coaching
- 2016: Logan Thunder

Career highlights
- NBL Most Valuable Player (1990); All-NBL First Team (1990, 1997, 1998); All-NBL Second Team (1995); All-NBL Third Team (1994); NBL scoring champion (1990); NBL single game assist record (24); NBL single season assist record (10.6/game); 3x First-team All-SoCon (1986–1988)

Derek Alan Rucker (born October 2, 1966) is an American-Australian former professional basketball player who starred in the Australian National Basketball League for 15 seasons.

== Biography ==
Prior to the commencement of his professional career, Rucker attended and graduated from the exclusive University School in Hunting Valley, Ohio. He accepted a basketball scholarship to attend Davidson College and quickly established himself as a player and leader by starting from his freshman year onwards. Rucker led the Wildcats to the NCAA Tournament his sophomore season and finished at Davidson as the 3rd (now 4th) all-time leading scorer and all-time assists (now 5th) and steals leader (currently 1st). In addition to being first team All-Southern Conference three years in a row and the Southern Conference Tournament MVP, Rucker was also a two-time Academic All-American. Davidson College retired Rucker's #11 uniform and inducted Rucker into the Davidson Hall of Fame.

Rucker won the league's coveted Most Valuable Player (MVP) award with the Brisbane Bullets in 1990. He began his career with Brisbane and played for the Newcastle Falcons, Townsville Suns and West Sydney Razorbacks before returning to the Bullets to finish his career.

Rucker finished his NBL career in the top ten all-time in several statistical categories: scoring (7th), assists (4th), steals (4th) and three-point field goals made (5th). He also finished in the top five in MVP voting four times in a six-year span. Rucker appeared in two championship series and was a two-time All-Star Game MVP. Rucker also played professionally in England and the Philippines.

In 2016, he was charged with fraud for stealing $20,000 from the Gladstone Basketball Association.

=== Playing style ===
Rucker played an aggressive, attacking offensive game. Rucker was a point guard who scored heavily while also amassing high assist totals throughout his career. He constantly raided the keyway and rim despite his size of 184 cm (6 ft 0 in) and 80 kg (180 lb). On account of his long-range shooting ability, Rucker is difficult to defend. Rucker's style of play during the boom years of the NBL in Australia thrust him into celebrity status in the new millennium.

== Personal ==
Rucker is the son of former NFL standout Reggie Rucker and Carole Gooch, and has two younger brothers. He and his former partner, Kim Skelton, have two children.

== Media work and post career ==
Rucker worked for numerous media entities in Australia during and after his playing career including Fox Sports, Channel 9, Radio 2UE Sydney, B105FM Brisbane and Brisbane's Courier Mail. He co-hosted the national NBL weekly recap show in with Stephanie Brantz on Australia's Channel 9 network. After retiring, Rucker became the Sydney Kings' Executive Director of Corporate Basketball Services. He also appeared in the feature film Living Color.

Rucker later ran a high-end sports tour in the United States called D-Ruck's Dream USA Sports Getaway. The first tour was completed in September 2013.

On May 23, 2014, Rucker joined the Gladstone Port City Power of the Queensland Basketball League for a one-game stint. In just over 27 minutes of action, he recorded 5 points, 2 assists and 2 steals in a loss to the Mackay Meteors. In 2015, he was appointed the Gladstone Port City Power chairman and head coach of the men's team. In November 2015, he was appointed head coach of the Logan Thunder for the 2016 QBL season.

== NBL career highlights ==
- 51 points in a game
- 24 assists in a game – NBL Record
- Averaged 30+ points per game three times
- 25 games of 40+ points
- 10.6 assists per game – NBL Record
- 2x Grand Finalist
- 3x All-NBL first team
- 2x All-Star Game MVP
