= Cairns Dolphins =

- League: NBL1 North
- Founded: 1987
- History: Cairns Dolphins; 1987–present
- Arena: Early Settler Stadium
- Capacity: 730
- Location: Cairns, Queensland
- Team colors: Deep sky blue, purple, white
- President: Mark Beecroft
- General manager: Graham Burns
- Ownership: Cairns Basketball Inc.
- Affiliation: Cairns Marlins
- Championships: 1 (1994)
- Website: NBL1.com.au
Home	Away

The Cairns Dolphins are an Australian basketball team based in Cairns, Queensland. The Dolphins compete in the women's NBL1 North and play their home games at Early Settler Stadium. The team is affiliated with Cairns Basketball Inc. (CBI), the major administrative basketball organisation in the region. CBI's men's team is the Cairns Marlins.

== Team history ==
After operating a successful basketball program in Cairns, Queensland, Cairns Basketball joined the Queensland State Basketball League in its second season in 1987. They fielded two teams, the Cairns Marlins in the men's competition and the Cairns Dolphins in the women's competition.

After a successful first season for the NBL1 in 2019, in 2020 it expanded into Queensland and replaced the QBL. After this change, the Dolphins transferred to the NBL1 North.

== Season by season ==
Season	League	Regular Season					Post-Season	Head coach	Captain	Club MVP
Season	League	Position	Played	Wins	Losses	Win %	Post-Season	Head coach	Captain	Club MVP
Cairns Dolphins
1987	QSBL									
1988	QSBL									
1989	QSBL									
1990	QSBL									
1991	QSBL									
1992	QSBL									
1993	QSBL									
1994	CBA						Champions in Finals against Ipswich Eagles			
1995	CBA									
1996	CBA									
1997	CBA									
1998	ABA									
1999	ABA									
2000	ABA									
2001	ABA									
2002	ABA									
2003	ABA									
2004	ABA									
2005	ABA									
2006	QABL						Lost in Final to Southern Districts Spartans			
2007	QABL									
2008	QABL									
2009	QBL									
2010	QBL									
2011	QBL	6th								
2012	QBL	10th								
2013	QBL	10th								
2014	QBL	11th								
2015	QBL	8th								
2016	QBL	5th						Mark Worthington		
2017	QBL	9th	17	7	10	.412	Did not qualify	Mark Worthington		
2018	QBL	9th	18	8	10	.444	Did not qualify	Kerry Williams		
2019	QBL	12th	18	5	13	.278	Did not qualify	Kerry Williams	Jonnae Downing	
2020	NBL1 North	Season cancelled								
2021	NBL1 North	TBD						Myra Donkin		

== Current squad ==
Cairns Dolphins roster
Players
Coaches

Pos.	No.	Nat.	Name	Ht.	Wt.
G	4	(Australia)	Oxlade, Chelsea
G	5	(Australia)	Heard, Andria
G	6	(Australia)	Luki, Jadah
G	7	(Australia)	O'Leary, Janali
G	8	(Australia)	Donkin, Myra (C)	1.73 m (5 ft 8 in)
G	9	(Australia)	Crotty, Felicity
G	10	(Australia)	Tombs, Emma
G	11	(Australia)	Downing, Jonnae	1.88 m (6 ft 2 in)
F	12	(Australia)	Heard, Sarah
F	13	(Australia)	Nakamura, Emma
G	21	(Australia)	Ross, Ebony
C	24	(Australia)	Williams, Leichan	1.88 m (6 ft 2 in)
G	30	(Australia)	Biondi-Howarth, Caitlyn

Head coach

- (Australia) Myra Donkin

Assistant coach(es)

- TBA

Legend

- (C) Team captain
- (IN) Inactive
- (I) Import player
- Injured

- Roster
Updated: 10 June 2021
