= Anita Brown =

Anita Brown was the founder of Black Geeks Online, an Internet community in the late 1990s and early 2000s. Brown lived in Washington, DC, for most of her life, and she died on September 8, 2006.
