= Living Color (film) =

- Original release poster
- Directed by: Neal Taylor
- Written by: Neal Taylor
- Produced by: Rene Nagy Jr
- Starring: Derek Rucker; Kim Denman; Michael Julian Knowles
- Production company: Cinérgy Motion Picture Entertainment
- Release date: 1992
- Running time: 95 mins
- Country: Australia
- Language: English
- Budget: $2.5 million

Living Color is a 1992 thriller film by Neal Taylor about a cat and mouse game between Molly (Kim Denman) and killer Christian (Michael Julian Knowles). It was shot in Brisbane between 5–21 January 1992 and was not released theatrically.
