= Bryce Washington (basketball) =

American basketball player (born 1996)

No. 2 – Maccabi Ramat Gan
- Position: Power forward
- League: Israeli Basketball Premier League

Personal information
- Born: January 25, 1996 (age 30) New Orleans, Louisiana, U.S.
- Listed height: 6 ft 8 in (2.03 m)
- Listed weight: 245 lb (111 kg)

Career information
- High school: St. Augustine (New Orleans, Louisiana)
- College: Louisiana (2014–2018)
- NBA draft: 2018: undrafted
- Playing career: 2018–present

Career history
- 2018–2019: St. John's Edge
- 2019: Mackay Meteors
- 2019–2021: Elitzur Netanya
- 2021–2023: Hapoel Galil Elyon
- 2023–2024: Rizing Zephyr Fukuoka
- 2024: Dorados de Chihuahua
- 2024–2026: Elitzur Netanya
- 2026–present: Maccabi Ramat Gan

Career highlights
- BIBL champion (2022); QBL All-League Team (2019); First-team All-Sun Belt (2018); Second-team All-Sun Belt (2017)

Bryce Washington (born January 25, 1996) is an American professional basketball player for Maccabi Ramat Gan of the Israeli Basketball Premier League. He played college basketball for the University of Louisiana at Lafayette, where he earned a spot in the First-team All-Sun Belt Conference in 2018.

== High school career ==
Washington attended St. Augustine in New Orleans, Louisiana, where he lettered in both basketball and baseball. With the basketball team, he averaged 15 points and 12 rebounds per game in his senior season, leaving high school as a two-time All-District 10-5A selection.

== College career ==
Washington averaged 6.4 points, 5.2 rebounds, and 1.6 assists per game in his freshman season with Louisiana. In the first round of the CollegeInsider.com Tournament, he scored 25 points en route to an 83–68 win over Incarnate Word. He was named Louisiana Sports Writers Association Co-Freshman of the Year. As a sophomore, Washington averaged 8.8 points, 5.7 rebounds, and 1.4 assists per game. On March 3, 2016, he posted a double-double of 21 points and 10 rebounds in a 72–69 loss to Georgia State.

Washington averaged 13.6 points, 11.2 rebounds, 2.1 assists, and 1.2 steals per game in his junior campaign. On February 13, 2017, he recorded 25 points and 13 rebounds in an 87–61 win over South Alabama. He earned second-team All-Sun Belt honors, leading the conference in rebounds and field goal percentage. As a senior, Washington averaged 10.4 points, 10.5 rebounds, and 1.3 steals per game. On November 17, 2017, in a 115–82 win over Savannah State, he recorded 21 points, 15 rebounds, and 5 steals. In the game, he reached the 1,000-point mark of his college career. Through the season, Washington established himself as one of the top NCAA Division I player in rebounds and double-doubles. He earned first-team All-Sun Belt honors.

== Professional career ==
On October 17, 2018, Washington signed with the St. John's Edge of the National Basketball League of Canada. In 16 games played for the Edge, he averaged a double-double of 12.1 points and 11.2 rebounds, to go with 2.5 assists and 1.5 steals per game.

On April 12, 2019, Washington signed with the Mackay Meteors of the Queensland Basketball League. On April 26, 2019, Washington recorded a career-high 33 points, shooting 13-of-16 from the field, along with 17 rebounds in an 83–87 loss to the Gold Coast Rollers. He was named to the QBL All-League Team. In 18 games played for the Meteors, he led the team in scoring (21.7) and rebounds (14.7) per game.

On August 2, 2019, Washington signed a two-year deal with Elitzur Netanya of the Israeli National League.

On September 9, 2021, Washington signed with Hapoel Galil Elyon of the Israeli Basketball Premier League. In 2021–22 he averaged 10.0 points, 6.0 rebounds, and 1.2 steals per game. He signed a contract extension with the team on January 24, 2022. In 2022-23 he averaged 13.5 points, 7.5 rebounds, 2.4 assists, and 1.4 steals per game.

On June 30, 2023, Washington signed with Rizing Zephyr Fukuoka of the B.League. In 60 games he had 14.2 points per game, 7.9 rebounds per game, 3.1assists per game, and 1.3 steals per game, and he was named Asia-Basket.com All-Japanese B League D2 Honorable Mention.

On November 10, 2024, he signed with Eltizur Netanya of the Israeli Basketball Premier League.

== Personal life ==
In high school, Washington was a member of the National Honor Society and held a 3.96 grade point average (GPA) as a senior. While majoring in accounting at the University of Louisiana at Lafayette, held a 3.3 GPA during his junior year and was named to the Sun Belt Conference Academic Honor Roll. Washington likes swimming, and admires swimmer Michael Phelps.
