= Auchenflower Stadium =

Basketball centre in Auchenflower, Queensland

- Interactive map of Auchenflower Stadium
- Location: 16 Dixon Street, Auchenflower, Queensland
- Coordinates: 27°28′38″S 152°59′49″E
- Capacity: 2,000

Construction
- Opened: 1973

Tenants
- Brisbane Bullets (NBL) (1979–1983); Brisbane Basketball Incorporated (1973–present)

Auchenflower Stadium is an Australian basketball centre in Auchenflower, Queensland. The stadium is the home of Brisbane Basketball Incorporated.

The four-court arena was the home of NBL side Brisbane Bullets until 1983. During that time, it was often referred to as The Auchendome. The facilities cater for those using wheelchairs.

During the 2010–11 Queensland floods, nine feet of water flooded the complex.

It also hosted the 2014 NBL Blitz during the pre-season of the 2014–15 NBL season, which saw the Townsville Crocodiles win the pre-season championship.

Other major events that were held at the venue include the 2013 Australian National Basketball Championships, the 2011 U14 National Australian Basketball Championship and the 2014 U16 Boys State Basketball Championship.

== See also ==
- Basketball in Australia
- Sport in Brisbane
