= USC Rip City =

- History: Sunshine Coast Rip; 2016; USC Rip City; 2017–2023
- Location: Sunshine Coast, Queensland
- Team colors: Lime green, black & white
- Championships: 0
- Website: SunshineCoastBasketball.com.au

USC Rip City is a former NBL1 North club based on the Sunshine Coast in Queensland, Australia. The club was a division of the University of the Sunshine Coast (UniSC) Basketball Association, with the Rip City playing their home games at UniSC Arena.

== Club history ==
The University of the Sunshine Coast Basketball Association was established in 2008. The Sunshine Coast Rip competed in the Southern Basketball League (SBL) in 2014 and 2015.

In 2016, the Sunshine Coast Rip debuted in the Queensland Basketball League (QBL).

In 2017, the club name was changed to USC Rip City. In 2020, USC Rip City joined the NBL1 North, which replaced the QBL. When the 2020 NBL1 season did not go ahead due to the COVID-19 pandemic, the club competed in the Queensland State League (QSL).

In the 2022 NBL1 season, the men's team reached the NBL1 North Grand Final, where they lost the best-of-three series 2–0 to the Gold Coast Rollers.

In October 2023, USC Rip City withdrew from the 2024 NBL1 North season.
