= Rockhampton Rockets =

- Leagues: NBL1 North
- Founded: 1986; 40 years ago
- History: Rockhampton Rockets; 1986–present
- Arena: Bravus Arena
- Location: Rockhampton, Queensland
- Team colors: Navy blue & white
- Championships: 5 (1996, 2008, 2010, 2013, 2014)
- Website: NBL1.com.au

The Rockhampton Rockets are an Australian basketball team based in Rockhampton, Queensland. The Rockets compete in the Men's NBL1 North and play their home games at Adani Arena. The team is affiliated with Rockhampton Basketball Inc., the major administrative basketball organisation in the region.

== Team history ==
=== Background ===
Rockhampton Basketball Inc., originally known as the Rockhampton Amateur Basketball Association, was formed in March 1962. Frank Howie, the coach of the first Rockhampton team to compete in a Queensland championship in 1961, was elected the inaugural secretary of the association; while John Hegvold, a member of that inaugural team, was the foundation vice-president of the association. Rockhampton's basketball stadium, formerly known as Hegvold Stadium, was designed by John's father Eddie and had its grand opening in December 1962. The facility was named in honour of Eddie.

=== Early days of the Rockets ===
1986 saw the formation of the Queensland State Basketball League (QSBL) with both a men's and women's competition. Rockhampton Basketball subsequently entered a team into both competitions—the Rockets joined the Men's QSBL, and the Cyclones joined the Women's QSBL. The Rockets were unsuccessful in claiming their maiden title during the moniker of the QSBL, as they failed to reach the championship game over the first eight seasons of the competition. In November 1993, the QSBL joined the Continental Basketball Association (CBA) and became the association's North Conference in 1994; Rockhampton was one of 12 teams in the conference's inaugural season.

=== First Championship ===
In 1995, the Rockets made their way through to their first ever grand final, where they were defeated by Southern Districts. The following year, they returned to the grand final and won their maiden state championship with a victory over Southern Districts in the title game.

=== Championship dynasty ===
The Rockets endured a championship drought between 1997 and 2007, as they made a lone grand final appearance in 2006 that saw a defeat at the hands of Southern Districts. On 17 August 2008, swingman Ben Thompson starred in the Rockets' 97–80 grand final victory over the Townsville Heat to claim the Warren Berginey Cup and their first QABL state championship in 12 years. In an inspirational performance, Thompson hit a game-high 30 points, including six-of-eight three-pointers, collected eight rebounds and three assists on his way to MVP honours. Two weeks later, the Rockets celebrated the city's first national championship after a courageous 103–99 victory over the Hobart Chargers in the grand final of the 2008 Australian Club Championships at the Melbourne Sports and Aquatic Centre. Centre Ryan McDade was named grand final MVP after recording 24 points and 19 rebounds.

The Rockets went on to qualify for six straight QBL Grand Finals between 2009 and 2014, winning titles in 2010, 2013 and 2014. Former NBL player Peni Nasalo was key to the Rockets' 2010 championship—in his first season with the Rockets, the experienced guard was one of Rockhampton's best, guiding the Rockets to grand final glory against the Mackay Meteors. The 2013 Rockets squad was stacked with NBL talent, with their starting line-up consisting of point guard Mitch Philp, shooting guard Justin Watts, small forward Brad Williamson, power forward Stephen Weigh and centre Michael Kingma. They reached the 2013 QBL Grand Final with ease, where they defeated the Brisbane Capitals 102–95. Philp took out the game MVP award for his effort of 26 points including six three-pointers and eight from 10 free throws, in addition to seven assists and two steals.

Heading into the 2014 season, the Rockets set their sights on creating a dynasty by winning back-to-back championships for the first time in team history. They were successful in doing so behind the leadership of American forwards Chehales Tapscott and Ray Turner, as the Rockets took out the best-of-three grand final series in a clean sweep, defeating the Mackay Meteors 2–0. Turner took out the MVP award for Game 2 for his efforts of 31 points and 15 rebounds.

=== NBL1 North ===
For the 2020 season, the Rockets joined the newly established NBL1 North, which replaced the QBL.

In 2026, Neal Tweedy entered his 26th season as head coach of the Rockets. He concluded his coaching career with the Rockets following the 2026 season.
