= Brisbane Capitals =

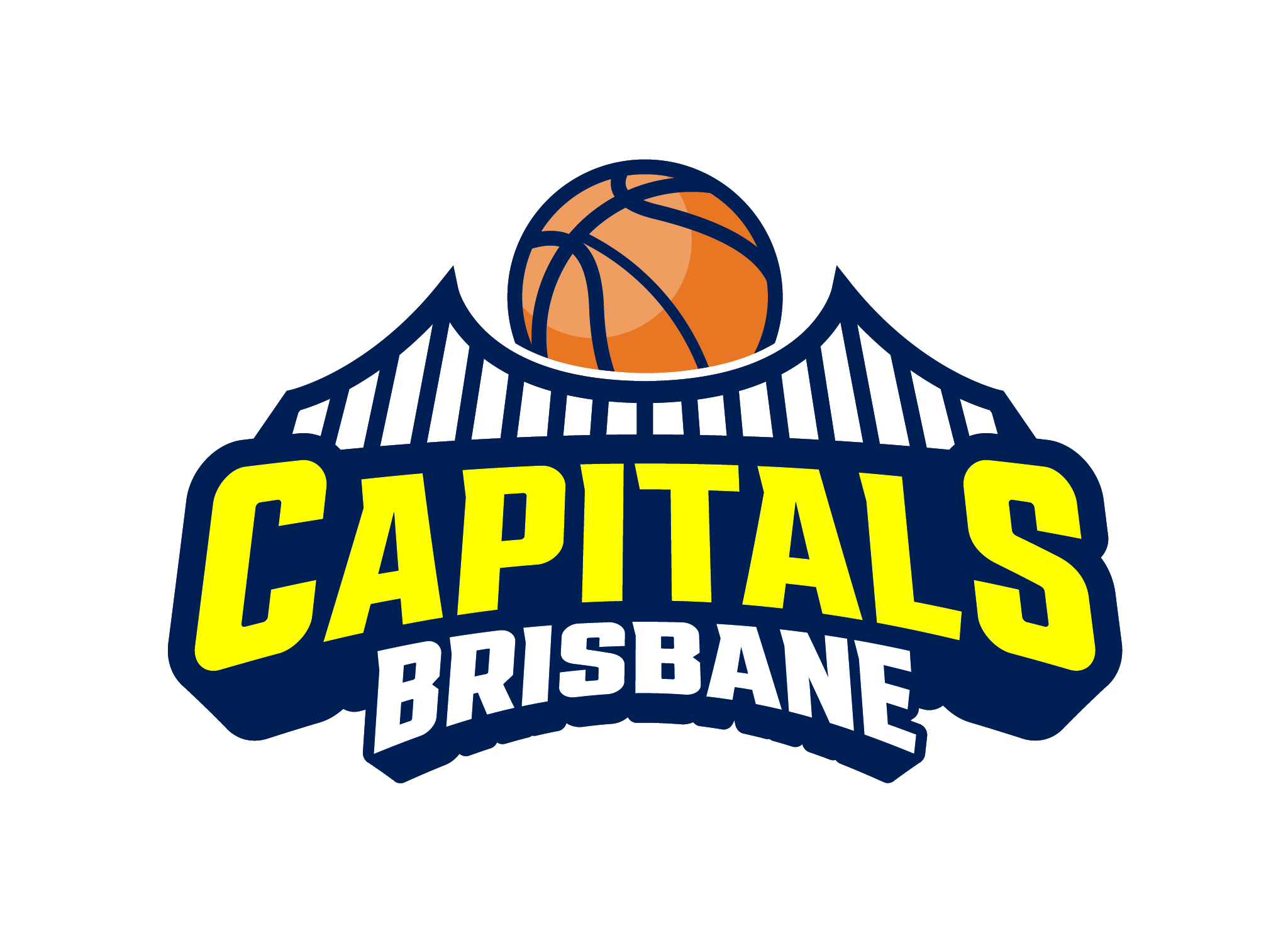
- Leagues: NBL1 North
- Founded: 1986
- History: Brisbane Brewers; 1986–2000; Brisbane Capitals; 2001–present
- Arena: Auchenflower Stadium
- Capacity: 700
- Location: Auchenflower, Queensland
- Team colors: Blue and yellow
- President: Mark O'Neill
- Vice-president: Craig Leaney
- Head coach: M: Patrick Williamson; W: Caddie O'Brien
- Championships: 3 (2002, 2019, 2020*) (M); 8 (1986, 1988, 1989, 1990, 1991, 1992, 2001, 2002) (W)
- Website: NBL1.com.au

Brisbane Capitals is a NBL1 North club based in Brisbane, Queensland. The club fields a team in both the Men's and Women's NBL1 North. The club is a division of Brisbane Basketball Incorporated (BBI), one of the major administrative basketball organisations in the region. The Capitals play their home games at Auchenflower Stadium.

== Club history ==
=== Background ===
In 1962, Brisbane Amateur Basketball Association (BABA) was formed. In 1979, the association entered the Brisbane Bullets into the inaugural National Basketball League (NBL) season. In 1982, the association entered the Brisbane Blazers into the Women's National Basketball League (WNBL). In 1984, the organisation was incorporated and became Brisbane Basketball Incorporated. The Bullets were sold in 1991, while the WNBL license was relinquished in 1995.

=== NBL1 (formerly QBL) ===
1986 saw the formation of the Queensland Basketball League (QBL) with both a men's and women's competition. Brisbane, trading as the Brewers, entered a team into both the Men's QBL and Women's QBL. The women's team saw immediate success, winning the inaugural championship before going on to win six titles in the competition's first seven seasons, including winning five in a row between 1988 and 1992. The Brewers women went on to finish as runners-up in 2000, before a name change to the Brisbane Capitals resulted in two more championships in 2001 and 2002. The men's team meanwhile were runners-up in 1991 and 2001 before winning their maiden championship in 2002.

In 2013, the Capitals men played in their first grand final since 2002, where they lost 102–95 to the Rockhampton Rockets. The Capitals returned to the grand final in 2015, losing the best-of-three series 2–1 to the Mackay Meteors. In 2016, the Capitals played in their third grand final in four years, this time losing 2–0 to the Cairns Marlins.

In 2019, the Capitals men made their seventh grand final appearance, where they won their second championship with a 2–0 series victory over the Gold Coast Rollers.

For the 2020 season, the Capitals joined the newly established NBL1 North, which replaced the QBL. The 2020 NBL1 North season was cancelled due to the COVID-19 pandemic, with the Queensland State League (QSL) taking its place for a shortened season. The Capitals men led by Jason Cadee and Jarred Bairstow defeated RedCity Roar in the grand final to claim the 2020 QSL championship.

In 2024, the Capitals men reached the NBL1 North grand final series, where they lost 2–0 to the Mackay Meteors. In 2025, the Capitals men again reached the NBL1 North grand final series, where they lost 2–0 to the Southern Districts Spartans.
