= Logan Thunder (NBL1 North) =

- Leagues: NBL1 North
- Founded: 2006
- History: Logan Thunder; 2006–2008; 2015–present
- Arena: Cornubia Park Sports Centre
- Location: Logan, Queensland
- Team colors: Navy, maroon & gold
- President: Nicole Kirisome
- Vice-president: Bronwyn Johnstone
- General manager: Mitchell Young
- Head coach: M: Luke Cann; W: Aja Parham-Ammar
- Championships: 0 (M); 3 (2020*, 2021, 2025) (W)
- Website: NBL1.com.au

Logan Thunder is a NBL1 North club based in Logan, Queensland, Australia. The club fields a team in both the Men's and Women's NBL1 North. The club is a division of Logan Basketball Inc., the major administrative basketball organisation in the region. The Thunder play their home games at Cornubia Park Sports Centre.

== Club history ==
Logan Basketball Inc. was established in July 1998, and by the mid-2000s, senior representative teams were competing in the Southern Cross Cup. In 2006, the Thunder entered the Queensland Basketball League (QBL), fielding both a men's and women's team. However, the club withdrew from the league following the 2008 season.

In September 2014, plans were made to bring the club back to life. Following 2008, Logan Basketball Inc. were unable to fund a state-league program due to all resources being used by the Logan Thunder WNBL team. In the wake of the collapse of the WNBL team, a QBL club was able to resurface for the 2015 season.

For the 2020 season, the Thunder joined the newly-established NBL1 North, which replaced the QBL. After the NBL1 season was cancelled due to the COVID-19 pandemic, the Thunder women went on to win the 2020 Queensland State League (QSL). In 2021, the Thunder women won the NBL1 North championship. In 2022, the women's team advanced to the NBL1 North Grand Final undefeated, but then lost the best-of-three series 2–0 to the Townsville Flames. In 2025, the women's team returned to the NBL1 North Grand Final series, where they defeated the Southern Districts Spartans 2–1 to win the championship.
