= Kolbe Catholic College =

Kolbe Catholic College may refer to:

- Kolbe Catholic College, Rockingham
- Kolbe Catholic College, Greenvale
