= Stephanie Reid =

Australian basketball player (born 1996)

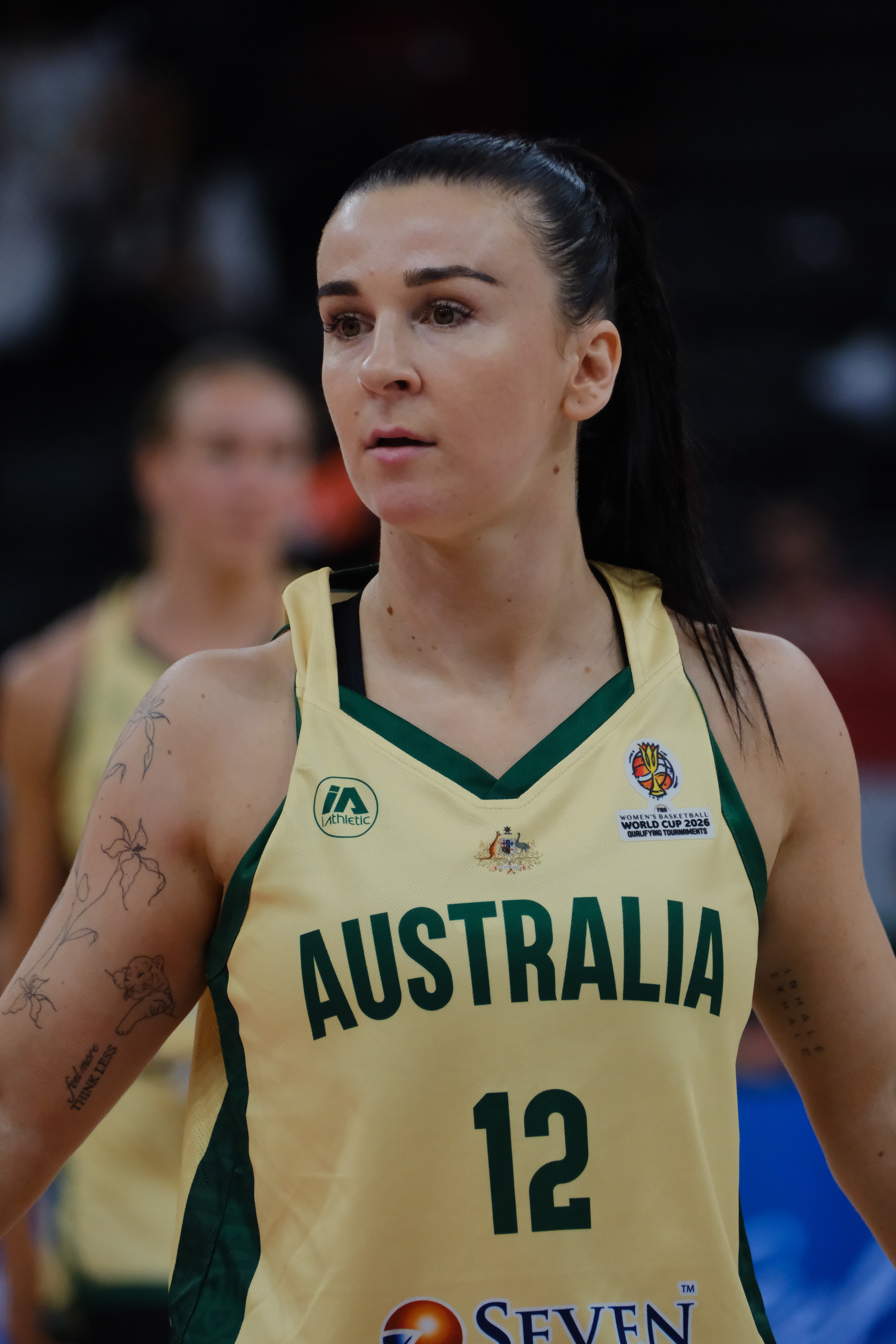
- Reid representing Australia in 2026

No. 12 – Tasmania Jewels
- Position: Point guard
- League: WNBL

Personal information
- Born: 22 July 1996 (age 30) Melbourne, Australia
- Listed height: 5 ft 6 in (1.68 m)

Career information
- High school: Peninsula (Mount Eliza, Victoria)
- College: Buffalo (2014–2018)
- WNBA draft: 2018: undrafted
- Playing career: 2018–present

Career history
- 2018–2020: Dandenong Rangers / Southside Flyers
- 2020–2024: Townsville Fire
- 2024–2025: Sopron Basket
- 2025–2026: AZS AJP Gorzów Wielkopolski
- 2026: Guangdong Vermilion Birds
- 2026–present: Tasmania Jewels

Career highlights
- WNBL champion (2023); NBL1 North champion (2022); Second-team All-MAC (2018); Third-team All-MAC (2016); 3× MAC All-Defensive Team (2016–2018); MAC tournament MVP (2016)
Medals
Basketball
Representing Australia
Asia Cup
Gold medal – first place	2025 China
Summer Universiade
Gold medal – first place	2019 Italy	Team

Stephanie Reid (born 22 July 1996) is an Australian basketball player. She is a Women's National Basketball League champion with the Townsville Fire in 2023, a NBL1 North champion with the Townsville Flames in 2022 and has been a member of the Australia women's national basketball team (Australian Opals) since 2022.

== College career ==
Reid played college basketball for the University at Buffalo in Buffalo, New York, playing for the Bulls.

Reid was the MVP of the 2016 MAC women's basketball tournament in which the Buffalo Bulls women's basketball team won their first MAC title and reached the NCAA tournament for the first time in the history of the women's program.

Arriving from Australia just a month after graduating from high school in November 2014, Reid was rushed into college basketball by the UB coaching staff. Reid made the starting lineup in mid January 2015 and remained the point guard for the team. Reid registered 349 points and 172 assists in the 2015-2016 season and is on track to make the 1000 point-500 assists club by senior year.

=== Statistics ===
Stephanie Reid College Statistics
Year	Team	GP	GS	MPG	FG%	3P%	FT%	RPG	APG	SPG	BPG	TO	PPG
2014–15	Buffalo	19	17	28.4	.429	.333	.714	2.7	3.4	0.8	0.1	2.7	6.7
2015–16	Buffalo	34	34	33.2	.381	.288	.812	3.4	5.0	1.8	0.1	2.9	10.3
2016–17	Buffalo	32	32	32.7	.403	.191	.734	3.1	7.2	2.0	0.1	2.5	11.5
2017–18	Buffalo	31	31	31.7	.444	.355	.810	3.2	6.8	2.3	0.1	2.7	12.1
Career		116	114	31.9	.410	.286	.771	3.0	5.8	1.8	0.06	2.7	10.5

== Professional career ==
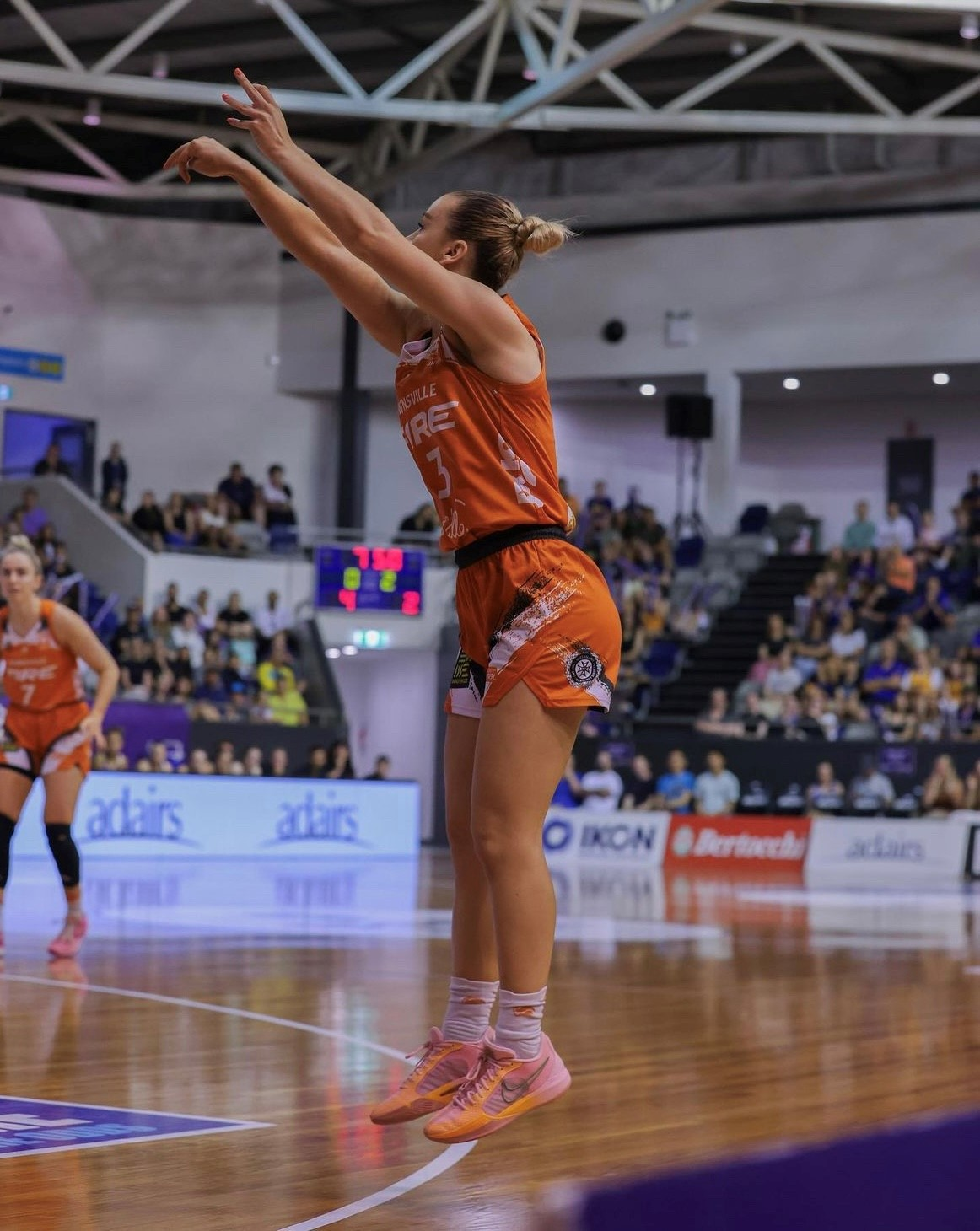
Stephanie Reid with the Townsville Fire in 2024

=== WNBL ===
Reid would begin her professional career with the Dandenong Rangers after signing for the 2018–19 WNBL season. After joining the Rangers, Reid would play alongside the likes of Rachel Jarry, Betnijah Laney and Rebecca Cole.

In 2019, Reid would remain with the franchise but under their new re-branded name, the Southside Flyers.

In 2020, Reid would travel North and sign with the Townsville Fire for the 2020–21 WNBL season. In 2021–22, she averaged 12 points per game with the Fire and was named Club MVP, along with being nominated for the WNBL's Robyn Maher Defensive Player of the Year Award. In 2022–23, she helped the Fire win their fourth championship. Across the Grand Finals games Reid would average 14.5 points and 5.5 assists and would be highly praised for her poise during high pressure moments. Over the course of the season Reid would average almost 14 points and 6 assists per game, whilst being named the Player of the Round in Round 6 as well as the Golden Hands Award and Cygnett Community Award, whilst again being nominated for the Robyn Maher Defensive Player of the Year Award. In 2023–24, she helped the Fire finish on top of ladder and earn Player of the Round in Round 10.

Reid joined the Tasmania Jewels for the 2026–27 WNBL season.

=== Europe ===
For the 2024–25 season, Reid joined Sopron Basket in the EuroCup Women.

For the 2025–26 season, Reid joined Polish team AZS AJP Gorzów Wielkopolski. She joined Chinese team Guangdong Vermilion Birds in January 2026.

=== Statistics ===
Stephanie Reid WNBL Statistics
Year	Team	GP	GS	MPG	FG%	3P%	FT%	RPG	APG	SPG	BPG	TO	PPG
2018–19	Dandenong Rangers	4	0	N/A	0	0	0	0.5	0.8	0.25	0	0.5	0
2019-2020	Southside Flyers	3	0	N/A	0	0	1.0	1	0	0	0	0.7	0.7
2020	Townsville Fire	16	0	N/A	.479	.467	.895	1.6	1.8	1.2	0.1	1.3	6.3
2021-2022	Townsville Fire	17	10	N/A	.443	.311	.944	2.9	4.9	1.35	0.1	2.3	12
2022-2023	Townsville Fire	22	21	N/A	.476	.283	.826	2.6	5.8	1.8	0.1	2.6	13.9
2023-2024	Townsville Fire	23	23	N/A	.397	.329	.847	3	4.7	1.6	0.1	1.7	12.7
Career		85	54	N/A	.436	.330	.863	2.5	4.1	1.3	0.1	2	10.7

== National team ==
In May 2025, Reid was named in the Opals squad for the 2025 FIBA Women's Asia Cup in China. She helped the Opals win gold.
