= Unique Thompson =

American basketball player (born 1999)

Southside Melbourne Flyers
- Position: Forward
- League: WNBL

Personal information
- Born: July 27, 1999 (age 27)
- Listed height: 6 ft 3 in (1.91 m)

Career information
- High school: Faith Academy (Mobile, Alabama)
- College: Auburn (2017–2021)
- WNBA draft: 2021: 2nd round, 19th overall pick
- Drafted by: Indiana Fever
- Playing career: 2021–present

Career history
- 2021–2022: WBC Sparta&K
- 2022: Albury Wodonga Bandits
- 2022–2025: Nadezhda Orenburg
- 2024: Albury Wodonga Bandits
- 2025: Mackay Meteorettes
- 2025–2026: Sydney Flames
- 2026: Albury Wodonga Bandits
- 2026–present: Southside Melbourne Flyers

Career highlights
- NBL1 East champion (2022); NBL1 East Grand Final MVP (2022); NBL1 North Most Valuable Player (2025); NBL1 North All Star First Team (2025); NBL1 North scoring champion (2025); NBL1 National Finals All-Star Five (2022); 2× NBL1 East All-Star Five (2022, 2026); First-team All-SEC (2020); Second-team All-SEC (2021); SEC All-Freshman Team (2018)
- Stats at Basketball Reference

Unique Thompson (born July 27, 1999) is an American professional basketball player.

== Early life ==
Thompson grew up in Theodore, Alabama, where she attended Faith Academy. She was the #74 overall recruit in her draft class and the #16 forward.

== College career ==
Thompson played college basketball at Auburn University. She averaged 14.1 points, 10.6 rebounds, 1.3 assists, 1.7 steals, and 0.6 blocks per game in college on a 52.8% field goal percentage. Thompson was an All-American honorable mention in 2020 and 2021. She was named to the SEC All-Freshman Team in 2018, All-SEC First Team in 2020, and All-SEC Second Team in 2021. She totaled 1,540 career points; 1,156 rebounds, making her Auburn's all-time leading rebounds; and 58 double-doubles, which is also a team record.

=== College statistics ===
Ratios
Year	Team	GP	FG%	3P%	FT%	RBG	APG	BPG	SPG	PPG
2017-18	Auburn	27	48.3%	-	56.3%	8.41	1.04	0.78	1.19	11.52
2018-19	Auburn	32	56.3%	-	61.0%	10.31	1.09	0.63	1.78	12.16
2019-20	Auburn	29	58.2%	-	69.0%	11.41	1.76	0.41	1.66	16.21
2020-21	Auburn	21	48.3%	100.0%	77.1%	12.76	1.29	0.43	2.38	17.62
Career		109	52.8%	100.0%	66.3%	10.61	1.29	0.57	1.72	14.13

Totals
Year	Team	GP	FG	FGA	3P	3PA	FT	FTA	REB	A	BK	ST	PTS
2017-18	Auburn	27	131	271	0	0	49	87	227	28	21	32	311
2018-19	Auburn	32	153	272	0	0	83	136	330	35	20	57	389
2019-20	Auburn	29	177	304	0	0	116	168	331	51	12	48	470
2020-21	Auburn	21	144	298	1	1	81	105	268	27	9	50	370
Career		109	605	1145	1	1	329	496	1156	141	62	187	1540

== Professional career ==
Thompson was chosen in the second round of the 2021 WNBA draft by the Indiana Fever of the Women's National Basketball Association (WNBA). She became the ninth player in Auburn program history to be drafted and the first since 2009.

Thompson made her professional debut in the 2021–22 season with WBC Sparta&K of the Russian Premier League.

In 2022, Thompson helped the Albury Wodonga Bandits win the NBL1 East championship behind grand final MVP honors. She was named to the NBL1 East All-Star Five and the NBL1 National Finals All-Star Five.

Thompson played for Nadezhda Orenburg in Russia in the 2022–23 and 2023–24 seasons.

Thompson returned to the Bandits for the 2024 NBL1 season. On May 19, she had a triple-double with 30 points, 22 rebounds, 11 steals and three assists in an 86–73 win over the BA Centre of Excellence.

Thompson returned to Nadezhda Orenburg for the 2024–25 season.

Thompson joined the Mackay Meteorettes of the NBL1 North for the 2025 season. She was named NBL1 North Most Valuable Player, NBL1 North All Star First Team, and NBL1 North scoring champion.

On July 17, 2025, Thompson signed with the Sydney Flames of the Women's National Basketball League (WNBL) for the 2025–26 season. She was named the Flames' Club MVP.

Thompson joined the Albury Wodonga Bandits for the 2026 season. She was named NBL1 East All-Star Five.

On November 4, 2026, Thompson signed with the Southside Melbourne Flyers for the rest of the 2026–27 WNBL season.
