= Marena Whittle =

Australian basketball player (born 1994)

Dandenong Rangers
- Position: Guard / Forward
- League: NBL1 South

Personal information
- Born: 28 January 1994 (age 32) Melbourne, Victoria, Australia
- Listed height: 5 ft 11 in (1.80 m)

Career information
- High school: Caulfield Grammar (Melbourne, Victoria)
- College: North Dakota State (2012–2016)
- WNBA draft: 2016: undrafted
- Playing career: 2016–present

Career history
- 2016–2018: Nunawading Spectres
- 2018–2019: Bendigo Spirit
- 2019: Knox Raiders
- 2019–2020: Perth Lynx
- 2020–2023: Adelaide Lightning
- 2021–2023: Ringwood Hawks
- 2023–2024: CB Estudiantes
- 2024: Warwick Senators
- 2024: Tarr KSC Szekszard
- 2024–2025: CB Estudiantes
- 2025: Rockingham Flames
- 2025: Mainland Pouakai
- 2025–2026: Shanxi Flame
- 2026–present: Dandenong Rangers

Career highlights
- TBA All-Star Five (2025); NBL1 National Finals All-Star Five (2022); NBL1 South champion (2022); NBL1 South Grand Final MVP (2022); 2× NBL1 South All-Star Five (2022, 2023); All-SEABL First Team (2017); First-team All-Summit League (2016)
Medals
Women's 3x3 basketball
Representing Australia
FIBA 3x3 World Cup
Silver medal – second place	2026 Warsaw	Team
Bronze medal – third place	2023 Vienna	Team
Commonwealth Games
Gold medal – first place	2026 Glasgow	Team
Bronze medal – third place	2022 Birmingham	Team
Asia Cup
Gold medal – first place	2024 Singapore	Team
Gold medal – first place	2025 Singapore	Team

Marena Whittle (born 28 January 1994) is an Australian professional basketball player.

== Early life ==
Whittle was born in Melbourne, Victoria, where she attended Caulfield Grammar School.

== College ==
Whittle played four seasons of college basketball in the United States for the North Dakota State in the NCAA Division I.

=== Statistics ===
Year	Team	GP	GS	MPG	FG%	3P%	FT%	RPG	APG	SPG	BPG	TO	PPG
2012–13	North Dakota State	29	26	28.4	.325	.250	.710	7.1	1.1	1.1	0.4	1.7	6.7
2013–14	North Dakota State	30	28	28.4	.407	.333	.826	7.1	1.2	1.1	0.9	1.4	13.4
2014–15	North Dakota State	29	29	29.9	.378	.314	.714	7.3	2.2	1.7	1.0	2.3	8.6
2015–16	North Dakota State	28	28	35.8	.391	.333	.832	10.3	2.9	2.1	0.9	3.5	16.8
Career		116	111	30.5	.383	.310	.784	7.9	1.9	1.5	0.8	2.2	11.3

== Professional career ==
Whittle debuted in the South East Australian Basketball League (SEABL) for the Nunawading Spectres in 2016. She played a second season for the Spectres in 2017 and earned All-SEABL First Team honours.

Whittle signed with Townsville Fire of the Women's National Basketball League (WNBL) for the 2017–18 season, but missed the entire season with a knee injury.

Whittle returned to the Spectres for a third season in 2018.

Whittle made her WNBL debut with the Bendigo Spirit in the 2018–19 season. She then played for the Knox Raiders of the NBL1 in the 2019 season.

Whittle joined the Perth Lynx for the 2019–20 WNBL season. She was recognised as the club's Most Improved Player for the season.

Whittle joined the Adelaide Lightning for the 2020 WNBL hub season in Queensland. She continued with the Lightning in 2021–22 and 2022–23. She also played for the Ringwood Hawks in the NBL1 South in 2021, 2022 and 2023.

For the 2023–24 season, Whittle moved to Spain to play for CB Estudiantes of the Liga Femenina de Baloncesto.

Whittle joined the Warwick Senators of the NBL1 West for the 2024 season.

Whittle started the 2024–25 season with Tarr KSC Szekszard in Hungary, but left in December 2024 to re-join CB Estudiantes.

Whittle joined the Rockingham Flames for the 2025 NBL1 West season. She later played for the Mainland Pouakai in the 2025 season of the Tauihi Basketball Aotearoa, where she was named to the All-Star Five.

In December 2025, Whittle joined Shanxi Flame of the Women's Chinese Basketball Association.

In May 2026, Whittle joined the Dandenong Rangers for rest of the 2026 NBL1 South season.

== National team career ==
With the Australian 3x3 team, Whittle won silver at the 2022 FIBA 3x3 Asia Cup and bronze at the 2023 FIBA 3x3 World Cup. She helped Australia win gold at the 2024 FIBA 3x3 Asia Cup. She was subsequently named in Australia's first 3x3 Olympic team for the 2024 Paris Olympics. She helped Australia win back-to-back gold medals at the 2025 FIBA 3x3 Asia Cup. In June 2025, she was named in the Australia 3x3 team for the 2025 FIBA 3x3 World Cup in Mongolia.

In March 2026, Whittle was named in the Australia 3x3 team for the 2026 FIBA 3x3 Champions Cup. In June 2026, she played for the Gangurrus at the FIBA 3x3 World Cup, where she won a silver medal. Later that month, she was selected for the Australian 3x3 team for the 2026 Commonwealth Games in Glasgow. The team went on to win the gold medal.

== Personal life ==
As of 2024, Whittle was engaged to fellow professional basketball player, Anneli Maley.

As of 2024, Whittle was studying a Juris Doctor at Deakin University.
