= Tasmania Jewels =

- League: WNBL
- Founded: 2025
- Arena: MyState Bank Arena; Silverdome
- Capacity: 4,800
- Location: Hobart, Tasmania
- Team colours: Burnham green, eucalyptus green, yellow
- CEO: Trent Jacobs
- Chairman: Steve Old
- General manager: Kayla Steindl (assistant GM)
- Head coach: Claudia Brassard
- Ownership: Altor Capital (majority owner)
- Website: tasmaniajewels.com.au

The Tasmania Jewels are an Australian professional basketball team based in Hobart, Tasmania, who will enter the Women's National Basketball League (WNBL) in 2026.

The Jewels will be the first Tasmanian WNBL team since the Hobart Islanders, who last played in 1996.

== History ==
In August 2025, the WNBL awarded Tasmania the ninth license, with the league expanding to nine teams for the 2026–27 season. On 1 December 2025, the club unveiled the team name of Tasmania Jewels, with the term jewel being a direct link to the queen ant and thus being a counterpart to the men's team, the Tasmania JackJumpers. On 2 March 2026, the Jewels announced that Claudia Brassard would be the team's inaugural head coach.

Ahead of the club's inaugural WNBL season in 2026–27, the Tasmania Jewels secured Australian Opals point guard Steph Reid as the first player in franchise history. Reid returned to Australia after playing for Sopron Basket in Hungary, bringing WNBL championship experience after winning the 2022–23 title with the Townsville Fire. Days later, the Jewels announced Gianna Kneepkens as the club's first international signing. The American guard joined Tasmania after helping UCLA win the 2026 NCAA Women's National Championship and being selected by the Connecticut Sun in the 2026 WNBA Draft. Kneepkens finished her five-year NCAA career as one of college basketball's most efficient shooters, converting 49.5% of her field goals, 43.1% of her three-point attempts and 87.0% of her free throws, with Reid and Kneepkens forming the foundation of the Jewels' inaugural backcourt.

For their inaugural season, the Jewels set a WNBL membership record of 3,349 and sold out their home opener against Geelong at the 4,800-capacity MyState Bank Arena in Hobart. The Jewels will play 11 home games in 2026–27, with six at MyState Bank Arena and five at the Silverdome in Launceston.

== Currant Squad ==
Inaugural Squad for WNBL 2026/27:

- # 1 Ava McDonald
- #2 Chloe Broomhall
- #3 Brooke Basham
- #4 Katie Deeble
- #5 Georgia Taylor
- #6 Portia Chopping
- #7 Mia Jacobs
- #8 Andie Smith
- #9 Nikki Parker
- #10 Gianna Kneepkens
- #11 Taylor Mole
- #12 Stephanie Reid
- #14 Darcee Garbin
- #21 Keely Froling
- #33 Mikaela Ruef (injury replacement player)
- #34 Ella Tofaeono
- # Madina Okok
