= Darcee Garbin =

Australian basketball player

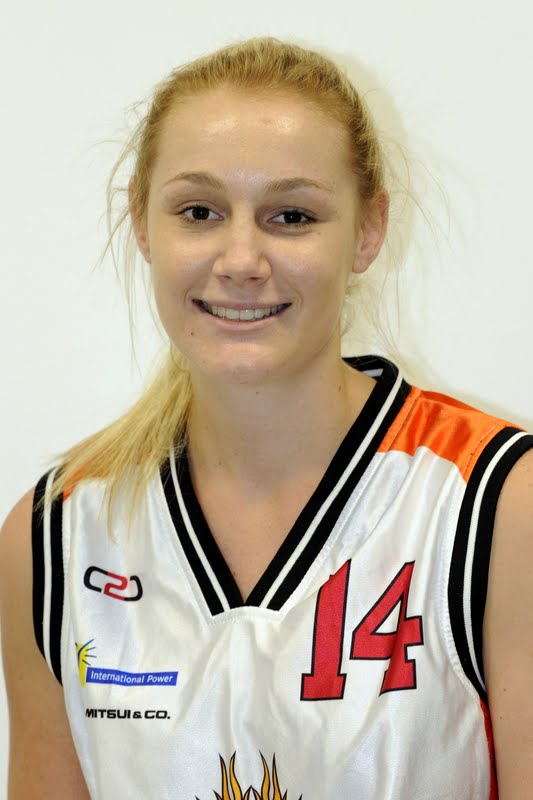
- Garbin with the Rockingham Flames in 2013

No. 14 – Tasmania Jewels
- Position: Forward
- League: WNBL

Personal information
- Born: 24 June 1994 (age 32) Kalgoorlie, Western Australia, Australia
- Listed height: 188 cm (6 ft 2 in)

Career information
- High school: Kolbe Catholic College (Perth, Western Australia)
- Playing career: 2011–present

Career history
- 2011–2016: Rockingham Flames
- 2011–2012: Australian Institute of Sport
- 2012–2015: West Coast Waves
- 2015–2020: Townsville Fire
- 2017–2018: Townsville Flames
- 2018–2019: Rockingham Flames
- 2019: Herner TC
- 2020–2022: Perth Lynx
- 2022–2024: DVTK-Hun-Therm
- 2023: Goldfields Giants
- 2024–2025: Serco Uni Győr
- 2026: Cockburn Cougars
- 2026–present: Tasmania Jewels

Career highlights
- Hungarian League (2024); 2× WNBL champion (2016, 2018); 3× SBL champion (2014, 2015, 2019); DBBL champion (2019); DBBL Cup winner (2019); NBL1 West Sixth Woman of the Year (2026); SBL All-Star Five (2019)
Medals
Women's basketball
Representing Australia
World Cup
Bronze medal – third place	2022 Australia
FIBA Asia Cup
Bronze medal – third place	2019 Bangalore
Bronze medal – third place	2021 Jordan
Bronze medal – third place	2023 Australia
Summer Universiade
Gold medal – first place	2017 Taiwan	Team

Darcee Garbin (born 24 June 1994) is an Australian professional basketball player for the Tasmania Jewels of the Women's National Basketball League (WNBL).

== Early life and family ==
Garbin was born in Kalgoorlie, Western Australia. She was raised in Kambalda before moving to Perth with her family. Garbin's younger sister, Sophie Garbin, is an Australia Fast5 netball international.

Garbin attended Kolbe Catholic College in the Perth suburb of Rockingham before moving to Canberra in 2011 to attend the Australian Institute of Sport.

== Playing career ==
=== WNBL ===
Garbin made her professional debut with the Australian Institute of Sport WNBL team during the 2011–12 season. She then returned to her home state and joined the West Coast Waves, where she played three seasons. In 2015, she moved to Queensland to play for the Townsville Fire. She played five seasons for the Fire and won two championships. She returned to the WA franchise, now known as the Perth Lynx, for the 2020 WNBL Hub season in Queensland. She was named captain of the Lynx for the 2021–22 WNBL season.

On 10 May 2026, Garbin signed with the Tasmania Jewels for the 2026–27 WNBL season, the team's inaugural season in the league. She was named team's inaugural captain.

=== SBL / NBL1 West and QBL ===
Garbin made her debut in the State Basketball League (SBL) for the Rockingham Flames in 2011. She played for Rockingham every year until 2016, winning championships in 2014 and 2015. In 2017, she played for the Townsville Flames in the Queensland Basketball League (QBL). In 2018, she split the year with Rockingham and Townsville. In 2019, she won her third championship with Rockingham.

On 26 May 2023, Garbin signed with the Goldfields Giants for the rest of the 2023 NBL1 West season.

In March 2026, Garbin signed with the Cockburn Cougars for the 2026 NBL1 West season. She was named NBL1 West Sixth Woman of the Year. She helped the Cougars reach the NBL1 West Grand Final.

=== Germany and Hungary ===
In February 2019, Garbin moved to Germany to play out the 2018–19 season with Herner TC of the DBBL, where she won the DBBL Cup and the league championship.

In June 2022, Garbin signed with DVTK-Hun-Therm of the Hungarian League. She returned to the team for the 2023–24 season and helped them win the Hungarian League championship.

Garbin played for Serco Uni Győr in the Hungarian League in 2024–25.

== National team ==
=== Youth level ===
Garbin made her national team debut at the 2010 FIBA Oceania Youth Tournament in New Caledonia where Australia took home Gold. She would then go on to represent the Gems at the 2012 FIBA Oceania Under-18 Championship, where she helped take home the Gold and secure a place at the Under-19 World Championship the following year. At the 2013 FIBA Under-19 World Championship in Lithuania, Garbin was a starting five team member. The Gems would go on to take home the bronze after a win over Spain.

In 2017, Garbin was picked to play for the Australian university women's team, the Emerging Opals. She posted 26 points and 10 rebounds en route to an 85–74 victory over Japan A night earlier, Garbin posted eight points and four rebounds against Team USA as Australia suffered a 63–78 loss.

=== Senior level ===
In January 2019, Garbin was named to her first Opals squad, earning her a place in the first camp as preparations for this years upcoming tournaments got underway. After taking part in the Opals team camps, Garbin was named to the final roster for the 2019 FIBA Asia Cup where she would make her Opals debut.

== Personal life ==
Garbin married fellow basketball player, Nic Cody, in 2024. Cody played at Lander University and for the Willetton Tigers before a debilitating back injury led to his retirement in 2017. He paused his engineering career to move to Europe with Garbin. Upon returning to Australia, he began FIFO working in the mines. The couple had their first child, a daughter, in December 2025.
