= Lauren Jackson =

Australian basketball player (born 1981)

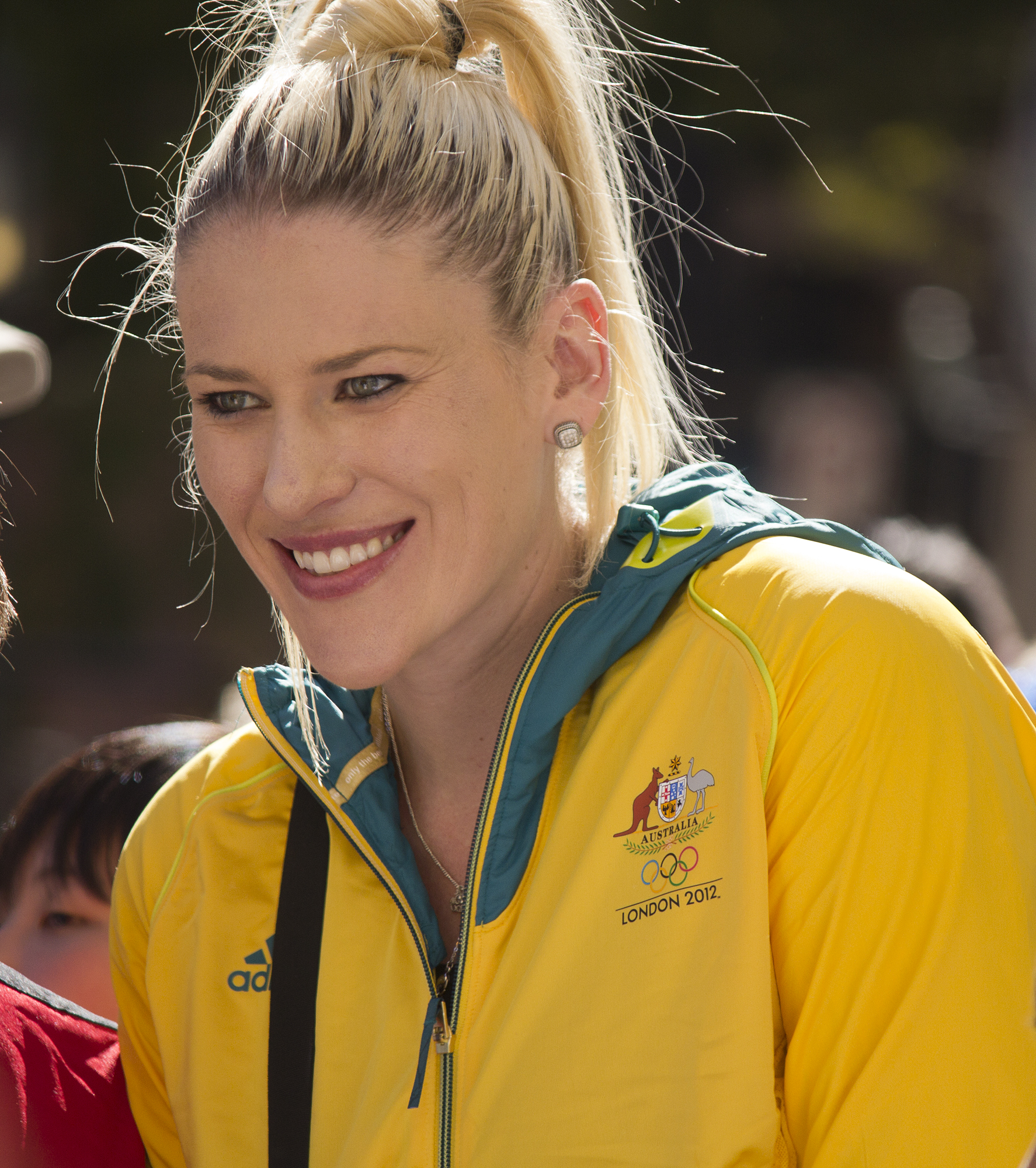
- Jackson in 2012 following the London Olympics

Personal information
- Born: 11 May 1981 (age 45) Albury, New South Wales, Australia
- Listed height: 196 cm (6 ft 5 in)
- Listed weight: 85 kg (187 lb)

Career information
- High school: Murray (Albury, New South Wales)
- WNBA draft: 2001: 1st round, 1st overall pick
- Drafted by: Seattle Storm
- Playing career: 1997–2016, 2022–2024
- Position: Power forward / center
- Number: 15, 25
- Coaching career: 2019–2019

Career history

Playing
- 1997–1999: Australian Institute of Sport
- 1999–2006: Canberra Capitals
- 2001–2012: Seattle Storm
- 2006–2007: Samsung Bichumi
- 2007–2009: Spartak Moscow Region
- 2009–2010: Canberra Capitals
- 2010: Spartak Moscow Region
- 2011–2012: Ros Casares Valencia
- 2013–2014: Heilongjiang Shenda
- 2014–2016: Canberra Capitals
- 2022: Albury Wodonga Bandits
- 2022–2024: Southside Flyers
- 2024: Albury Wodonga Bandits

Coaching
- 2019: Albury Wodonga Bandits

Career highlights
- 7× WNBL champion (1999, 2000, 2002, 2003, 2006, 2010, 2024); 4× WNBL MVP (1999, 2000, 2003, 2004); 4× WNBL Grand Final MVP (2002, 2003, 2006, 2010); 6× WNBL All-Star Five (1999–2004); WNBL Rookie of the Year (1997); 2× WNBA champion (2004, 2010); 3× WNBA MVP (2003, 2007, 2010); WNBA Finals MVP (2010); WNBA Defensive Player of the Year (2007); 7× All-WNBA First Team (2003–2007, 2009, 2010); All-WNBA Second Team (2008); 7× WNBA All-Star (2001–2003, 2005–2007, 2009); 3× WNBA scoring champion (2003, 2004, 2007); WNBA rebounding champion (2007); 2× All-Defensive First Team (2007, 2009); 3× All-Defensive Second Team (2005, 2008, 2010); 3× WNBA Peak Performer (2003, 2004, 2007); WNBA anniversary teams (10th, 15th, 20th, 25th); No. 15 retired by Seattle Storm; NBL1 East champion (2022); NBL1 East MVP (2022); 3× EuroLeague champion (2008, 2009, 2012); Spanish League champion (2012); 2× Russian League champion (2007, 2008); Korean League MVP (2007); Australian Basketball Hall of Fame (2019)
- Stats at WNBA.com
- Stats at Basketball Reference
- Basketball Hall of Fame
- Women's Basketball Hall of Fame
Medals
Women's basketball
Representing Australia
Olympic Games
| Silver medal – second place | 2000 Sydney | Team |
| Silver medal – second place | 2004 Athens | Team |
| Silver medal – second place | 2008 Beijing | Team |
| Bronze medal – third place | 2012 London | Team |
| Bronze medal – third place | 2024 Paris | Team |
World Cup
| Bronze medal – third place | 1998 Germany |
| Bronze medal – third place | 2002 China |
| Gold medal – first place | 2006 Brazil |
| Bronze medal – third place | 2022 Australia |
World Junior Championships
| Silver medal – second place | 1997 Brazil |
Commonwealth Games
| Gold medal – first place | 2006 Melbourne | Team |

Lauren Elizabeth Jackson AO (born 11 May 1981) is an Australian former professional basketball player. Arguably the most notable Australian women's basketball player, Jackson has had a decorated career with the Australia women's national basketball team (the Opals) and has had multiple stints in the Women's National Basketball League (WNBL) between 1997 and 2024. Between 2001 and 2012, she played in the Women's National Basketball Association (WNBA).

With the Australian Opals, Jackson played at the Summer Olympics in 2000, 2004, 2008, 2012 and 2024, winning three silver medals and two bronze medals. In the WNBL, she is a seven-time champion (1999, 2000, 2002, 2003, 2006, 2010, 2024) and a four-time league MVP (1999, 2000, 2003, 2004). In the WNBA, she won two championships (2004, 2010) and three league MVPs (2003, 2007, 2010).

The daughter of two national basketball team players, Jackson was awarded a scholarship to the Australian Institute of Sport (AIS) in 1997, where she debuted in the WNBL when she was 16. She helped the AIS win the WNBL championship in 1999 before joining the Canberra Capitals, where she won championships in 2000, 2002, 2003 and 2006 during her first stint. She won her sixth championship in 2010 with Canberra and her seventh in 2024 with the Southside Flyers. She earned WNBL Grand Final MVP in 2002, 2003, 2006 and 2010.

In 2001, Jackson entered the WNBA draft and was selected by the Seattle Storm. She played 12 seasons for the Storm, with her final WNBA season coming in 2012. She helped the team win championships in 2004 and 2010 while earning Finals MVP in 2010. Jackson ranks among the top WNBA players in games played, minutes played, field goals, three-point shots, and turnover percentage. She collected multiple individual accolades and was named to multiple WNBA Anniversary Teams.

In 2016, Jackson retired from basketball. She came out of retirement in 2022 and returned to the WNBL and the Opals. She retired again following the 2024 Paris Olympics. Jackson was inducted into the Australian Basketball Hall of Fame in 2019, Women's Basketball Hall of Fame in 2020, and Naismith Memorial Basketball Hall of Fame in 2021.

== Early life ==
Jackson, whose nicknames include "Loz", "Jacko" and "LJ", was born in Albury, New South Wales, on 11 May 1981, the older of two children of Gary Jackson and his wife Maree Bennie. Both her parents played for Australia's national basketball teams and Jackson inherited her height from both parents. Jackson was 196 cm by the time she turned 16, after she gained 15 cm in height when she was 15 years old. Her father, Gary, played for the Boomers in 1975, while her 6 feet 2 inches (1.88 metres) mother, Maree, played for the Opals from 1974 to 1982. Bennie played in two World Championships, and for the women's basketball team at Louisiana State in the late 1980s, wearing the number 15, the number Jackson wears in her mother's honour. Bennie was one of the first Australians to play in the American collegiate system, where she was known for her aggressive style of play and was nicknamed "the assassin". Her parents continued to play basketball locally on a social level when Lauren and her brother were young, and her family had a basketball court in their backyard when Jackson was growing up. Her grandfather played for the Western Suburbs Magpies.

Jackson grew up in Albury, where she attended Murray High School.

Jackson started playing basketball at the Albury Sports Centre when she was four years old. As a six-year-old, she told others that she would one day play for the Australian national team in Basketball. Her mother taught her how to play. She first played competitive basketball as a six-year-old she played on a local under-10 side. Her mother was her coach for two years. This was difficult for both mother and daughter in order to change their personal dynamics. As an 11-year-old, Jackson was not the best player in Albury, but she played in the under-14 Australian Country Championships. Her team made it to the Grand Final one year, and she played in the match despite having hurt her knee. She was upset after the event. In response to this, her parents sat down with her and explained she did not need to continue to play if she did not want to. Following this conversation, she went to her room and typed a message on her computer that said "from this day on, nothing will stand in my way..."

When she was 14 years old, Jackson led her New South Wales side to a national championship gold. Her performance in the tournament attracted the attention of the national team selectors. Tom Maher said of the game: "Right then and there, I said, 'Is this the best thing I've ever seen?' It was just unbelievable. Those old guys had seen a lot of basketball, and they were drooling." As a competitor at the 1999 Australian Under-20 national championships, she won the Bob Staunton Award for the tournament MVP. She was described as a basketball prodigy by the time she was seventeen years old.

Jackson was active in other sports growing up, competing in athletics at school as well as tennis and netball. At the age 14, basketball commitments led to her giving up the other sports.

== Professional career ==
Jackson was recognised as one of the world's best basketball players by the time she was 21. She has been described as Australia's best female player and the best female basketball player in the world. She has said regarding being the best female basketball player in the world: "I don't really think about it. Nobody really talks to me like that. It's not something I'm conscious of. My family and people who have known me all my life, they see me for who I am, and crack open a beer or a bottle of wine with me. They know I have to train, but the rest of it is really laid-back."

Jackson played two positions, power forward and centre, and had the ability to make jump shots and spinning bank shots.

Jackson had a rivalry with American basketball player Lisa Leslie. The rivalry reportedly started when Jackson was on tour in the United States with the Opals as a 16-year-old. The rivalry intensified in 2000 at the Olympics in the gold medal match when Jackson purposely pulled off Leslie's hair extension while both were trying to grab a rebound. Jackson treated the incident as a joke, saying "It was something to joke about even though we lost the gold medal." Leslie did not feel the same way about the extension pulling incident. The rivalry continued when Jackson transitioned to the WNBA and her Seattle Storm team played Leslie's Los Angeles Sparks, who at the time were the best team in the league. The rivalry was so intense that their coaches had to coach around it, sometimes choosing to keep one off the floor when the other was on. The coaches feared if they left the players on the floor together, their own player would foul out in an attempt to get the best of the other player. Leslie and Jackson have played together as team members in the WNBA's All-Star game. Their rivalry thawed somewhat by 2007 but they did not become friends.

=== WNBL ===
==== 1997–2016 ====
Jackson was offered a scholarship with the Australian Institute of Sport (AIS) in 1996, when she was just 15, but her parents said no to this, as it required her to move from Albury to Canberra. The next year, she accepted a scholarship and joined the AIS basketball team in the Women's National Basketball League (WNBL) for the 1997 season. The programme considers her one of its success stories. She was named the WNBL Rookie of the Year for the 1997 season. With Jackson leading a side composed of the best 16- to 17-year-old development players in the country, the AIS won the WNBL championship in the 1998–99 season.

Jackson joined the Canberra Capitals for the 1999–2000 season and helped them win the championship, recording 15 points, 14 rebounds and four blocks in a 67–50 win over the Adelaide Lightning in the grand final. She helped the Capitals return to the grand final in 2000–01, where they lost to the Sydney Panthers despite her 22 points and 20 rebounds. She won her third championship in 2001–02 with a victory over Sydney in the grand final. She was named grand final MVP for the first time after recording 29 points and 21 rebounds.

In December 2002, a Capitals' game against the Townsville Fire in Townsville was moved to the Townsville Entertainment and Convention Centre, which seated 5,000 people instead of at the Fire's normal 800-seat stadium, because it was felt Jackson would draw that large a crowd. She did, with 4,110 people showing up to the game and setting a regular season attendance record for the Fire. Canberra lost the match despite 23 points from Jackson, which was six below her average of 29 points per game at that point in the season. At the time, the attendance was the best ever for a regular season WNBL game, with only two Grand Finals games in the post season having more people in attendance. Jackson went on to lead the Capitals to the 2002–03 championship where she was named grand final MVP for the second time. She played with the Capitals in the 2003 FIBA Club World Cup for Women where she averaged 30.6 points and 11.4 rebounds per game.

In October of the 2003–04 season, Jackson had a 48-point game. This was her highest individual game point total at the time and is her single highest WNBL point scoring game.

At the conclusion of the 2005–06 season, Jackson had played 154 WNBL games and won five championships.

In November 2006, Jackson indicated to the media that she might be interested in playing in the men's National Basketball League (NBL). The NBL confirmed that the competition's rules would not stop Jackson, or any other female, from participating in the league should a club wish to sign her.

Jackson returned to the Capitals for the second half of the 2009–10 WNBL season and helped them win another championship.

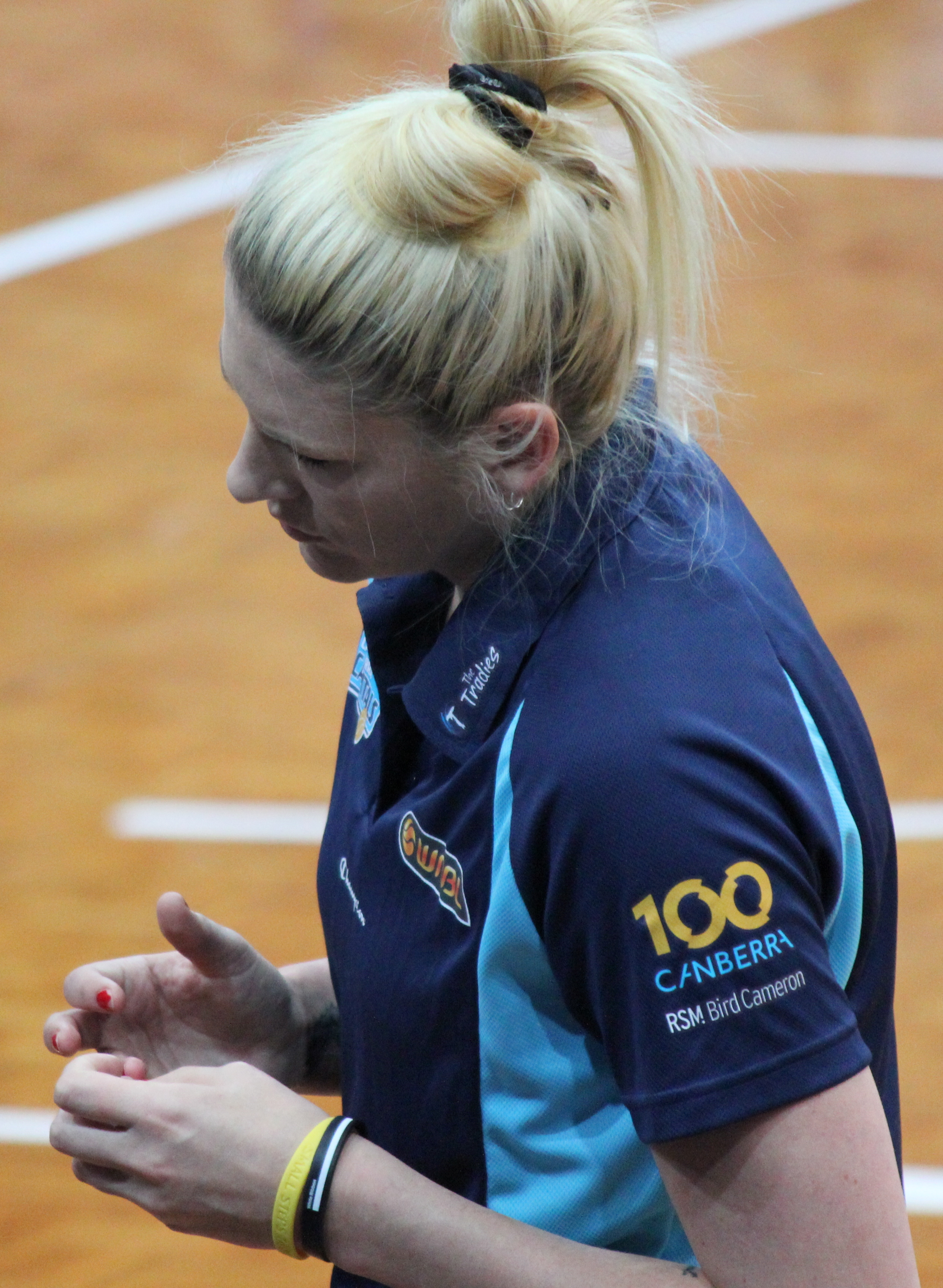
Jackson with the Capitals in 2012

In 2011, Jackson signed a unique $1 million three-season, five-year deal to play with the Capitals. This was the most an Australian woman had ever been offered to play for a domestic side in the country. Injuries prevented Jackson from playing in the 2012–13 WNBL season. For the 2013–14 season, the Capitals missed the deadline date to sign Jackson and led her to play in China instead.

Jackson re-joined the Capitals for the 2014–15 WNBL season but did not join the team until December 2014 after undergoing hip surgery in September. Jackson appeared in six games, losing only one as she averaged 13 points and seven rebounds. She required weekly drainings of synovial fluid out of her knee and eventually her knee gave in. A subsequent MRI scan showed further damage to her knee that required new surgeries, forcing Jackson to sit out the rest of the season. She did not play for the Capitals in 2015–16 and the team released her from her contract in January 2016.

==== 2022–2024 ====
Jackson came out of retirement at the age of 40 to play for the Albury Wodonga Bandits of the NBL1 East in the 2022 NBL1 season. She was named league MVP and helped the Bandits win the NBL1 East championship.

In August 2022, Jackson signed with the Southside Flyers for the 2022–23 WNBL season. A February 2023 game against the Sydney Flames set a WNBL record crowd of 7,681 spectators due to the interest in Jackson's participation; however during the game an Achilles injury put Jackson out for the rest of the season.

With the Flyers in the 2023–24 season, Jackson helped the team win the grand final series against the Perth Lynx. It marked her seventh WNBL championship.

Jackson joined the Albury Wodonga Bandits for the 2024 NBL1 East season. In May 2024, she had a game with 43 points and 22 rebounds and a game with 50 points and 19 rebounds. She had another 50-point game in June.

After undergoing a knee replacement following the 2024 Paris Olympics, Jackson once again retired from basketball.

=== WNBA ===
Seattle viewed Jackson as a franchise player. On the court in the WNBA, she was known for her sharp and stinging comments directed at other players. Opposition players knew they could get at Jackson by giving her sneaky fouls and nettling her back with some trash talk. While playing in the WNBA, she has dyed her hair different colours several times. She ranks 35th in the league for total played games with 308. She has played 9,958 minutes in the league and ranks 16th all time in this category. In her career, she has made 2056 field goals, ranking third all time in this category. She ranked fifth all time in the league with 4,456 field goal attempts. She ranked 34th overall career wise in the league with a field goal percentage of 46.1%. Career wise, she ranks 10th overall for three-point field goals with 430. She attempted 1219 three-point field goals in her career, ranking 10th on the league's all time leaderboard. She was ranked second all time in the league for turnover percentage with 9.4.

==== 2001 ====
In 2001, Jackson was drafted first when she entered the WNBA draft in the fifth year of the league having a draft and was selected by the Seattle Storm. Her parents stayed with her in Seattle for the first month she played in the WNBA in 2001. Jackson's first season included 32 games played over the course of 11 weeks, a much more difficult competition in terms of total games compared to Australia's domestic league. She played in 21 games. Jackson ranked eighth in the league with 406 field goal attempts. In her debut game with the team, she scored 21 points. On 3 July 2001, Jackson set a WNBA record for most minutes played in a single game with 55 in a game against Washington that had four overtime periods. That season, she averaged 15.2 points per game, came in second for the WNBA's Rookie of the Year award. At the end of the first season with the Storm, Jackson required surgery on her right shoulder. She attempted 129 three-point field goals this season, ranking eighth in the league. She had a player efficiency rating of 22.5. Jackson ranked seventh in the league in this category for the season, and was a WNBA All Star.

==== 2002 ====
Jackson was a WNBA All Star again in 2002, and played in the All Star Game. She averaged 17.2 points per game. She was the team's captain, the youngest in the WNBA at the time. During one game which was attended by 11,000 fans, the fans loudly chanted her name. In 2002, Carrie Graf, who had been an assistant coach on the Australian national team from when Jackson for played for it, changed coaching positions in the WNBA from Phoenix to Seattle specifically to make Jackson feel more comfortable playing for the team. She was estimated to have earned $200,000 to play for the Storm in 2002.

In the second game of the 2002 final series against the Los Angeles Sparks, Jackson scored only four points in a loss by her team, after being kneed in the groin by Lisa Leslie. In 2002, she only earned one technical foul the whole season. Jackson's mother spent two weeks in Seattle with her during this season. At the end of the second season with the Storm, she had severe pain as a result of shin splints. Jackson and Sue Bird first played together this season and would continue to play together for the Storm into the 2010 season. During the 2002 season, Jackson's team got into a fight when they played the Los Angeles Sparks.

In the 2002 season, Jackson played in 28 games, averaging 31.5 minutes per game. She averaged 2.9 blocks per game,. and attempted 120 three-point field goals this season, ranking 10th in the league. Jackson ranked second in the league with 462 field goal attempts, and made 186 field goals, ranking sixth in the league in this category. She had a player efficiency of 24.5. Jackson ranked fourth in the league in this category this season. She was ranked first in the league for turnover percentage with 8.6.

==== 2003 ====
Jackson was a WNBA All Star again in 2003, and was named to the 2003 All-WNBA First Team. This season, she averaged 21.2 points per game. By the end of the season, she had scored 1,000 points in the league, the youngest player to date to score that many points in the league. She was named the league's MVP, and was one of the top five women in the league for average number of rebounds per games and blocks per game. She called Tom Maher and her Seattle Storm coach Anne Donovan after winning the award, and cried for an hour after learning she won. She was the first non-American to be named the league's MVP and the youngest player to earn this honour.

In the 2003 season, Jackson played in 33 games, averaging 33.6 minutes per game. She averaged 1.9 blocks per game. She ranked first in the league for field goals, with 254, for total points with 698, for field goal attempts with 526, and for win shares with 9.2, and offensive win shares with 6.7. She also ranked first in the league with 21.2 points per game average, and had a player efficiency of 32.1, likewise ranking first in the league, and led the league with win share per 48 minutes with 40.0%. She ranked third in the league with a field goal percentage of 48.3%, and for total minutes played with 1,109.

==== 2004 ====
In 2004, her Seattle Storm team won the WNBA Championship. She was again named to the 2004 All-WNBA First Team. This season, she averaged 20.5 points per game. She played in 31 games, averaging 34.5 minutes per game. She averaged 2.0 blocks per game. She made 220 field goals and ranked second in the league in this category. She ranked fourth in the league with 460 field goal attempts. She ranked seventh in the league with a field goal percentage of 47.8%, and her three-point field goal shooting percentage was 45.2%, ranking third in the league. She ranked first in the league for total points with 634, and for points per game with 20.52 points on average, and had a player efficiency of 28.0, second in the league in this category. She ranked third in the league with a true shooting percentage of 59.0%, and ranked first in the league for offensive win shares with 6.1.

==== 2005 ====
Jackson was a WNBA All Star again in 2005, and was named to the 2005 All-WNBA First Team. This season, she played in 34 games, averaging 34.6 minutes per game. She averaged 17.6 points per game, and 2.0 blocks per game. She ranked third in the league for her 34 total games, and for her 206 field goals. She ranked fifth in the league for total minutes played with 1,176, and for field goal attempts, with 450. She attempted 118 three-point field goals this season, ranking eighth in the league, and was ranked first for total defensive rebounds with 217. She had a player efficiency of 26.7. She ranked first in the league in this category this season. She was also ranked first in the league for turnover percentage with 10.0, in the offensive rating category with 117.6, for offensive win shares with 6.0, for win shares with 8.2, and with win share per 48 minutes with 33.3%.

==== 2006 ====
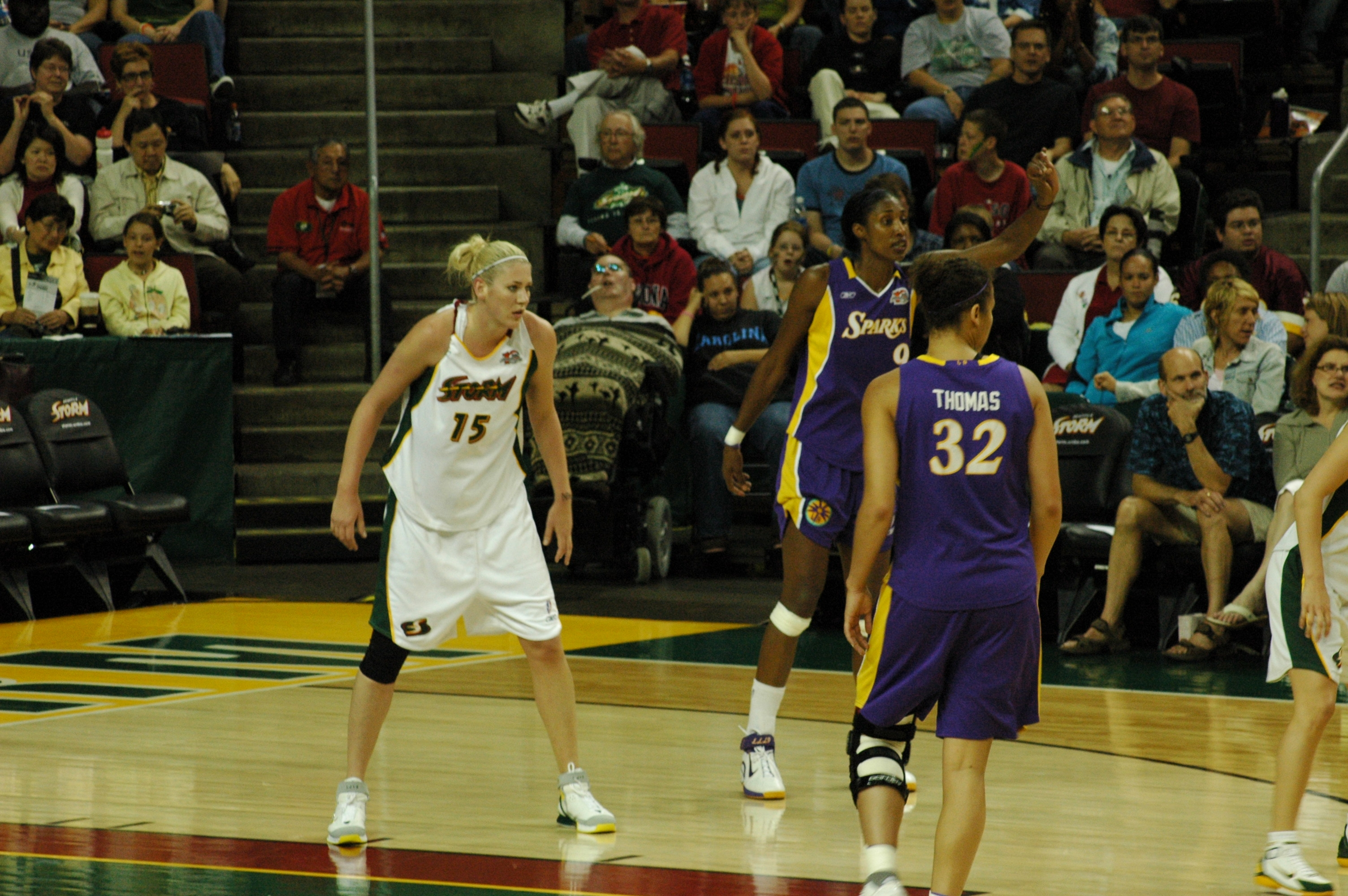
Jackson (#15) with the Storm in July 2006

Jackson was still with the Seattle Storm in 2006, coached by Anne Donovan. She was a WNBA All Star again in 2006, and was named to the 2006 All-WNBA First Team. In 2006, she was named to the WNBA All-Decade Team. Jackson of this said "That was cool. It was brilliant to be recognised like that in America. It's a tough, emotionally draining lifestyle there but it's fun." She ranked first in the league with the number of free throws with 170.

This season, she averaged 19.5 points per game, she played in 30 games, averaging 28.4 minutes per game. She averaged 1.7 blocks per game. She made 193 field goals and ranked seventh in the league. She ranked second in the league with a field goal percentage of 53.5% She had a player efficiency of 34.9, and ranked first in the league in that category that season.

She ranked first in the league with a true shooting percentage of 65.8%. In effective field goal percentage, she finished first in the league with 57.5%. She ranked first in the league in the offensive rating category with 135.3. She ranked first in the league for offensive win shares with 7.4. She ranked first in the league for win shares with 8.8. She ranked first in the league with win share per 48 minutes with 50.0%. At the end of the season, she had stress fractures in both of her shins, and her team exited the post season before making it to the league championship series.

In 2006, she was also inducted into the AIS's 25 Best of the Best program.

==== 2007 ====
Jackson was a WNBA All Star for the sixth time in 2007. On 24 July 2007, she scored 47 points in a game against Washington and set a league high single game scoring total that she currently shares. In 2007, she was named the WNBA Defensive Player of the Year. She was also named to the 2007 All-WNBA First Team. She averaged 23.8 points per game, the most points she had averaged per game for a season in the WNBA. She was also named the league's Most Valuable Player. In voting, she received 473 points, with her nearest vote-getting competitor, Becky Hammon, getting only 254. In 2007, she became the first WNBA player to score 4,000 total points the youngest player, as well as the fastest woman to reach the milestone; being named the league MVP gave her a $18,238 bonus and a Tiffany & Co. designed trophy.

Jackson played in 31 games in 2007. She averaged 32.9 minutes per game. Her field goal percentage was 51.9%. She averaged 22.4 points, 2.16 blocks, and 9.3 rebounds per game at the time of the All-Star Break, leading the league in points and blocks, and was second for rebounds. At the All-Star break, she had a three-point shooting percentage of 40.5%. At the end of the season, she expressed an interest in ending her WNBA career with the Storm as she could not see herself playing elsewhere. Her three-point field goal percentage was 40.2%. She had a free throw shooting percentage of 88.3%. She averaged 2.0 blocks per game. She made 258 field goals, ranking second in the league in this category. She ranked third in the league with 497 field goal attempts. She ranked third in the league, with a field goal percentage of 51.9%. She ranked first in the league in defensive rebounds, with 220, for total rebounds, with 300, and for total average number of rebounds per game, with 9.7.

Jackson had a player efficiency rating of 35.0, ranking first in the league in this category this season. She ranked first in the league with a true shooting percentage of 63.3%. In effective field goal percentage, she finished first in the league, with 56.8%. She was also ranked first in the league for turnover percentage, with 8.8, for her offensive rating category of 127.7, for offensive win shares with 7.9, win shares with 9.5, and win share per 48 minutes with 44.6%. In all, she finished the season ranked in the top ten players in no less than twenty-eight different statistical categories.

==== 2008 ====
In 2008, Jackson averaged 20.2 points per game. In July 2008, she scored 33 points for the Seattle Storm in an 84–71 win against Washington. This was her season-high scoring high. On the same day she was officially named to the 2008 Australian Olympic squad, and the Seattle Storm went out of the post season in the first round. In 2008, she played in 21 games. She averaged 33.1 minutes per game. Her field goal percentage was 45.2%, and her three-point field goal percentage was 29.5%. She had a free throw shooting percentage of 93.4%, averaged 1.6 blocks per game, and had a player efficiency of 26.7, ranking third in the league in this category this season.

==== 2009 ====
In 2009, Jackson became a WNBA All Star for the seventh time and was named to the 2009 All-WNBA First Team. This season, she averaged 19.4 points per game. She played in 26 games, in which she averaged 32.3 minutes per game. Her field goal percentage was 46.3%. Her three-point field goal percentage was 43.0%, she had a free throw shooting percentage of 79.7%, and her three-point field goal shooting percentage was 43.0%, ranking fifth in the league. Her player efficiency was 26.1, the highest efficiency of any player that season, and her win share of 33.3% per 48 minutes was the highest also.

==== 2010 ====
Jackson played for the WNBA All-Stars at the Stars at the Sun game in 2010, and her Seattle Storm team won the WNBA Championship. She was named to the 2010 All-WNBA First Team. This season, she averaged 20.5 points per game. On 2 September 2010, Jackson was presented her third MVP Award at the Seattle Storm's Game 1 of the Western Conference Finals against the Phoenix Mercury. On 17 September 2010, the Storm beat the Atlanta Dream to win the WNBA championship for the second time. Jackson was named the finals MVP. In 2011, she was voted in by fans as one of the Top 15 players in the fifteen-year history of the WNBA.

Jackson played in 32 games. She averaged 31.0 minutes per game, with a field goal percentage of 46.2%, and a three-point field goal percentage of 34.6%. She had a free throw shooting percentage of 91.0%, She made 220 field goals, ranking sixth in the league, and ranked fifth in the league with 476 field goal attempts. She attempted 156 three-point field goals this season, ranking eighth in the league. She had a player efficiency of 27.9, ranking first in the league in this category this season. She also ranked first in the league in the offensive rating category with 126.3, for offensive win shares with 6.1, for win shares with 8.3, and for win share per 48 minutes with 40.0%. In the locker room, Jackson would talk to her teammates about topics including women's rights and Lady Gaga.

==== 2011 ====
In 2011, Jackson had to deal with a number of injuries that kept her out for most of the season. She injured her hip in a game against the Tulsa Shock, and had surgery for it on 30 June. That season, Jackson played in only 13 games. She missed 20 games in a season that is 34 games long. After Jackson came back from her surgery, her team won eight out of her first nine games. She averaged 24.9 minutes per game. Jackson's field goal percentage was 39.6%, her three-point field goal percentage was 31.1%, and had a free throw shooting percentage of 88.4%. In June 2011, she signed a three-year contract with the team.

==== 2012 ====
Jackson opted to sit out the early part of the 2012 season as she wanted to concentrate on making the national team and competing in the Olympics. She returned in September and helped the Storm in two blowout wins against the Tulsa Shock, but then an injury sustained during the Olympic preparations sidelined Jackson for three games. Upon her return on 21 September, Jackson became the fourth WNBA player to reach 6,000 points. Jackson wound up playing just 167 minutes on the regular season. The Storm saw an early playoff exit in their series against the Minnesota Lynx, with Jackson attempting a buzzer beater in the third game but falling short. This turned out to be Jackson's final game in the WNBA.

==== Injuries ending her WNBA career ====
A hamstring surgery forced Jackson out of the 2013 season, and she also missed the 2014 season after surgery on both her right knee and left Achilles in February. The final year of her Storm contract was suspended in 2013 and dissolved under the new collective-bargaining agreement signed in 2014, but Seattle still retained Jackson's rights. During her 2014 recovery, Jackson expressed interest in returning to Seattle in 2015, saying that despite so much time sidelined by injury, "I've just had too good of a career there to let that fall by the wayside." However, these hopes of returning to the WNBA and the Storm for the 2015 season were sidelined when Jackson had further surgery on her right knee in the spring of 2015. Her attentions turned to the 2016 Summer Olympics in Rio de Janeiro. However, in November 2015, Jackson announced that her rehabilitation had suffered a setback that would keep her from practising until January 2016. Upon taking the court again, she stated she would decide in February 2016 if she would participate in what would be her fifth Olympic games or retire from the sport. Her retirement was announced one month later.

==== WNBA career statistics ====
Legend
| GP | Games played | GS | Games started | MPG | Minutes per game | RPG | Rebounds per game |
| APG | Assists per game | SPG | Steals per game | BPG | Blocks per game | PPG | Points per game |
| TO | Turnovers per game | FG% | Field-goal percentage | 3P% | 3-point field-goal percentage | FT% | Free-throw percentage |
| **Bold** | Career best | ° | League leader |

| † | Denotes seasons in which Jackson won a WNBA championship |

===== Regular season =====
| Year | Team | GP | GS | MPG | FG% | 3P% | FT% | RPG | APG | SPG | BPG | TO | PPG |
|---|---|---|---|---|---|---|---|---|---|---|---|---|---|
| 2001 | Seattle | 29 | 29 | 34.5 | .367 | .310 | .727 | 6.7 | 1.5 | **1.9** | 2.2 | 1.83 | 15.2 |
| 2002 | Seattle | 28 | 28 | 31.5 | .403 | .350 | .756 | 6.8 | 1.5 | 1.1 | **2.9** | 1.68 | 17.2 |
| 2003 | Seattle | 33 | 33 | 33.6 | .483 | .317 | .825 | 9.3 | **1.9** | 1.2 | 1.9 | 2.09 | 21.2° |
| 2004^{†} | Seattle | 31 | 31 | 34.5 | .478 | **.452** | .811 | 6.7 | 1.6 | 1.0 | 2.0 | 2.06 | 20.5° |
| 2005 | Seattle | **34** | **34** | **34.6** | .458 | .288 | .834 | 9.2 | 1.7 | 1.1 | 2.0 | 1.74 | 17.6 |
| 2006 | Seattle | 30 | 30 | 28.3 | **.535** | .377 | .899 | 7.7 | 1.6 | 0.8 | 1.7 | **1.33** | 19.5 |
| 2007 | Seattle | 31 | 31 | 32.9 | .519 | .402 | .883 | **9.7**° | 1.3 | 1.0 | 2.0 | 1.81 | **23.8**° |
| 2008 | Seattle | 21 | 21 | 33.0 | .452 | .295 | **.934** | 7.0 | 1.2 | 1.5 | 1.6 | 1.90 | 20.2 |
| 2009 | Seattle | 26 | 26 | 32.4 | .463 | .430 | .797 | 7.0 | 0.8 | 1.5 | 1.7 | 1.65 | 19.2 |
| 2010^{†} | Seattle | 32 | 32 | 31.0 | .462 | .346 | .910 | 8.3 | 1.2 | 0.9 | 1.2 | 1.44 | 20.5 |
| 2011 | Seattle | 13 | 13 | 24.8 | .396 | .311 | .884 | 4.9 | 0.3 | 1.0 | 0.8 | 1.31 | 12.2 |
| 2012 | Seattle | 9 | 9 | 24.8 | .425 | .311 | .720 | 4.9 | 0.3 | 1.0 | 0.8 | 1.30 | 12.2 |
| Career | 12 years, 1 team | 317 | 317 | 31.9 | .460 | .351 | .842 | 7.7 | 1.4 | 1.1 | 1.8 | 1.74 | 18.9 |

===== Postseason =====
| Year | Team | GP | GS | MPG | FG% | 3P% | FT% | RPG | APG | SPG | BPG | TO | PPG |
|---|---|---|---|---|---|---|---|---|---|---|---|---|---|
| 2002 | Seattle | 2 | 2 | 34.0 | .346 | .000 | .714 | 5.0 | **1.5** | 1.5 | **3.0** | 2.00 | 11.5 |
| 2004^{†} | Seattle | **8** | **8** | 35.9 | .469 | **.727** | .897 | 7.5 | 1.4 | 1.0 | 1.1 | 2.00 | 19.6° |
| 2005 | Seattle | 3 | 3 | 34.0 | .436 | .308 | .833 | 8.0 | 0.7 | 1.3 | 1.3 | 2.67 | 14.3 |
| 2006 | Seattle | 3 | 3 | 30.3 | .536 | .286 | .917 | 8.0 | 0.7 | 0.7 | 2.3 | **1.67** | 18.0 |
| 2007 | Seattle | 2 | 2 | 34.0 | **.565** | .300 | **1.000** | **11.5**° | 0.5 | 1.0 | 1.5 | 2.50 | 19.0 |
| 2010^{†} | Seattle | 7 | 7 | **36.1** | .465 | .314 | .836 | 9.6° | 1.1 | **1.7** | 1.4 | 1.86 | **21.6** |
| 2011 | Seattle | 3 | 3 | 27.3 | .382 | .385 | .700 | 3.7 | 0.3 | 0.3 | 1.3 | 1.33 | 15.0 |
| 2012 | Seattle | 3 | 3 | 30.3 | .278 | .273 | .700 | 7.7 | 1.0 | 1.1 | 1.5 | 0.33 | 10.0 |
| Career | 8 years, 1 team | 31 | 31 | 33.6 | .443 | .376 | .841 | 7.8 | 1.0 | 1.1 | 1.5 | 1.81 | 17.5 |

=== Other ===
==== Korea ====
In December 2006, Jackson moved to South Korea to play for Samsung Bichumi of the Women's Korean Basketball League. In February 2007, she was named Most Valuable Player of the league's all-star game. In March, she set a league record with 56 points in a game against Kumho Redwings. It eclipsed her previous personal record of 48 points in a game for Canberra in the WNBL in October 2003. She was named the league's Most Valuable Player after averaging 30.2 points per game.

==== Russia ====
Immediately following her season in Korea, Jackson moved to Russia where she was paid six figures for a one-month stint with WBC Spartak Moscow Region. The team had just won the 2006–07 EuroLeague. Her teammates included Sue Bird, Diana Taurasi, and Tina Thompson. Jackson helped Spartak win the 2006–07 Russian Superleague title.

Jackson continued playing for Spartak in 2007–08 and 2008–09. The team won the 2007–08 Russian Superleague title as well as the 2007–08 EuroLeague and 2008–09 EuroLeague. She scored 35 points in a EuroLeague game on 11 April 2008 against UMMC Ekaterinburg. It was her highest single-game scoring total in a Euroleague game. She averaged 23.6 points and 7.1 rebounds per game in 2007–08.

In 2009, Jackson had an option of extending her contract with Spartak for two more years. However, following the assassination of team owner Shabtai Kalmanovich, she decided against extending her contract. She later returned to Spartak for the 2010–11 season. On 3 December 2010, she was named the EuroLeague Women Player of the Week after recording 28 points and 14 rebounds against VICI Aistes. She averaged 17.3 points and 8.4 rebounds per game prior to leaving the team in early January 2011 because of an injury, returning to Australia for her recovery. Part of her treatment involved getting an MRI. According to Jackson, she left Russia for Australia because "I couldn't move, the swelling was very obvious, and the pain was just a little bit too painful. That's when I got home to all these messages and e-mails from people back in Australia who had seen the scans and said 'you need to come back (to Australia) and start your rehab right away'."

==== Spain ====
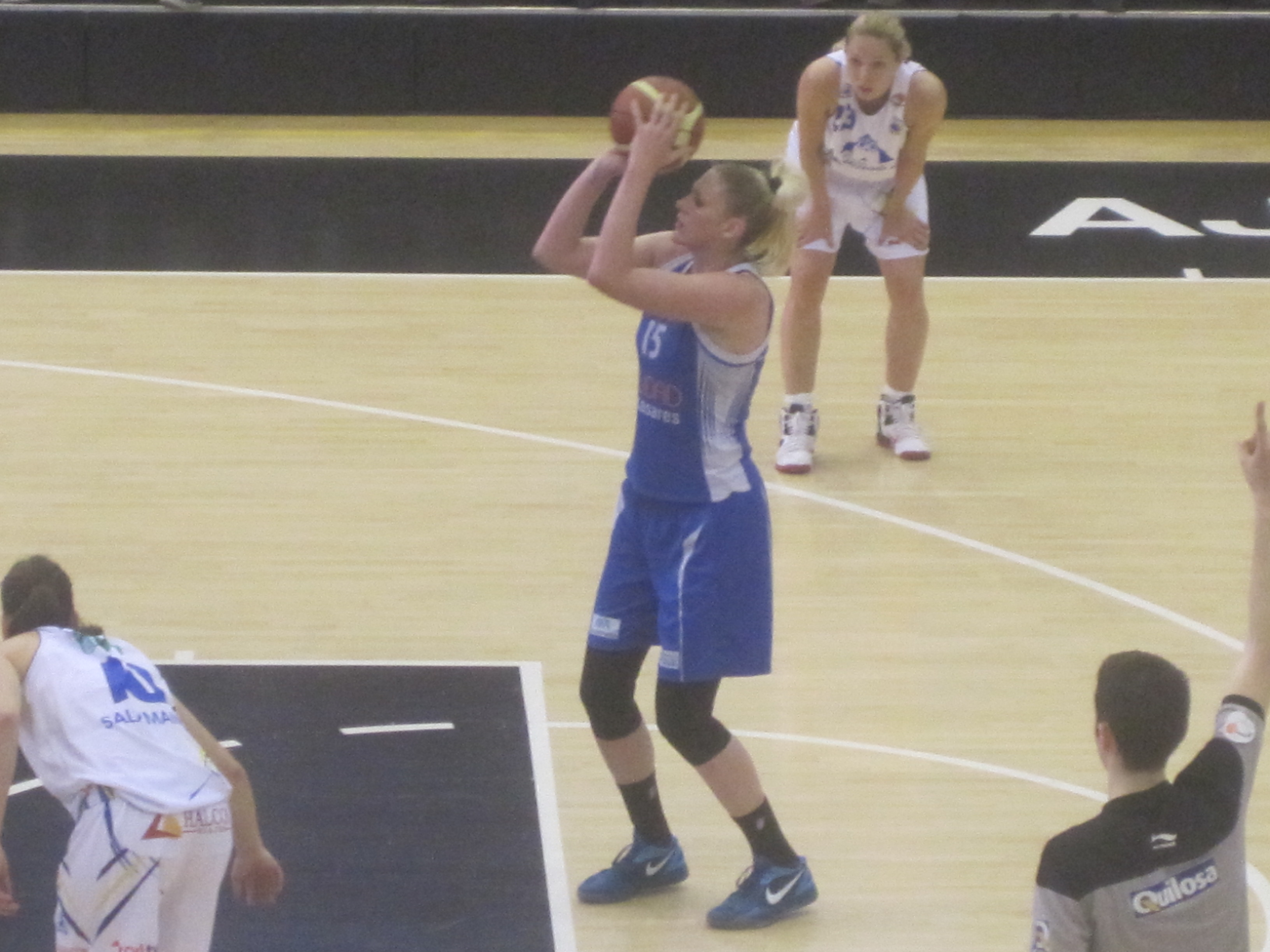
Jackson with Ros Casares Valencia in April 2012

For the 2011–12 season, Jackson joined Ros Casares Valencia in Spain, playing in the Liga Femenina and the EuroLeague. She ranked 16th in the league for three-point field goal shooting percentage at 41.5% and 17th in the league for three-point field goals made per game at 1.4. She scored 16 points on 29 March 2012 against Sparta&K M.R. Vidnoje, her highest total number of points in a single game in the 2011–12 season. She helped the team win the 2011–12 EuroLeague championship.

==== China ====
For the 2013–14 season, Jackson joined the Heilongjiang Shenda of the Women's Chinese Basketball Association. She helped Heilongjiang qualify for the playoffs with averages of 22 points, 9.5 rebounds and 1.8 steals per game, but a heel injury saw Jackson miss the post-season. During the season, she injured her meniscus. It was not deemed too grave at the time, but the knee problems would escalate during the following years.

== National team career ==
Left to right: Lauren Jackson, Carrie Graf, and Jenna O'Hea at a 14 May 2012 press conference at the Australian Institute of Sport

Jackson made the Australian under-20 team when she was only 14 years old. She was first called up to the senior national team when she was 16 years old. Her national team coaches Tom Maher and Carrie Graf say positive things about Jackson to the press and others but they rarely have said those things to Jackson. This is a strategy designed to help motivate Jackson to play better. Tom Maher who was the coach that called her up said, "She's so good she could be the greatest sportswoman in the world. She's that extraordinary." Graf has described Jackson as one of the superstars of the game.

Jackson was a member of the 1997 Australian Junior Women's Team that won a silver medal at the World Championships in Brazil. At the time, she was 16 years old. She averaged 14.3 points per game and 9.9 rebounds per game. She was also a member of the 1998 Australian Senior Women's Team that won a bronze medal at the World Championships in Germany. At the time, she was 16 years old and the youngest Australian woman ever to be named to the team. In the tournament, she averaged 10.9 points per game and 3.9 rebounds per game. She was a key part of the team's success. She was coached in the tournament by Tom Maher. She came off the bench to play.

In the Olympic test tournament in the lead up to the 2000 Summer Olympics, Jackson scored 18 points and 10.7 rebounds per game. She was a member of the 2000 Summer Olympics team that won a silver medal. At the 2000 Games, she scored 127 total points, had 23 total blocked shots, 12 steals and 67 rebounds. She averaged 15.9 points and 8.4 rebounds per game. In the 76–54 loss in the gold medal game, she scored 24 points and had 13 rebounds. She led the team in points scored and total rebounds. Going into the Olympics, her team was ranked third in the world. At the Sydney Games, she was coached by Tom Maher. The gold medal final was against the United States.

Jackson was a member of the Australian Senior Women's Team that won a silver medal in the World Championships in China in 2002. She averaged 23.1 points a game in the competition and was named to the All-Star team for the tournament. She averaged 5.4 rebounds per game. In a semi-final match against the United States, Jackson fouled Lisa Leslie three times in the first six minutes of the game. The team lost while Jackson spent most of the time on the bench. By January 2003, Jackson had played over 100 games with Australia's senior side. She competed in the 2003 World Championships and was named the International Basketball Federation's Most Valuable Player. At the FIBA Diamond Ball Tournament for Women 2004, she averaged 22.7 points and 14.0 rebounds per game.

Jackson was a member of the Australian senior team that won a silver medal at the 2004 Summer Olympics, where she averaged 22.9 points and 10.0 rebounds per game. The gold medal final was against the United States. In 2006, she was a co-captain with Jenny Whittle of the Australian women's senior team that won a gold medal at the Commonwealth Games. She played in the preliminary final against the Mozambique women's national basketball team, and the gold deal match against New Zealand. Jackson was the captain of the Australian women's senior team that won a gold medal at the World Championships in Brazil in 2006 that beat Russia in the Gold Medal match. This was the first time Australia had ever earned gold in the event. Jackson averaged 21.3 points and 8.9 rebounds per game. While the national team is called The Opals, Jackson asked Basketball Australia if they were to make rings for team members in honour of their win, if they would use diamonds instead of opals.

As captain of the 2008 Summer Olympics Australian women's team that won a silver medal at the Olympics, Jackson averaged 17.3 points and 8.6 rebounds per game. In the FIBA Diamond Ball Tournament for Women 2008, Jackson averaged 20.3 points per game and 5.0 rebounds per game. In 2010, she was a member of the senior women's national team that competed at the World Championships in the Czech Republic. She averaged 13.4 points per game and 7.9 rebounds per game.

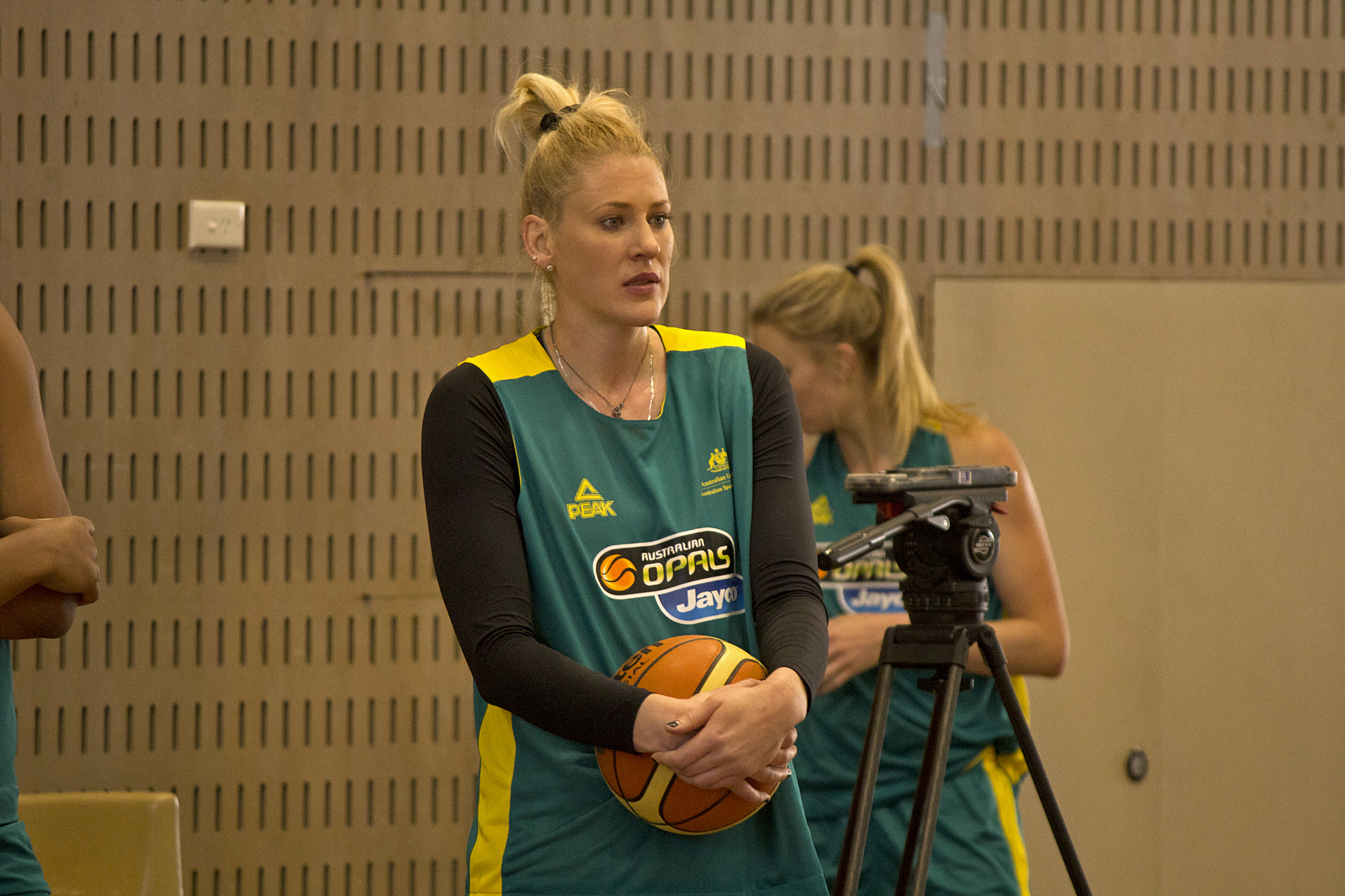
Jackson with the Opals in May 2012

Jackson missed the first training camp for the 2012 Summer Olympics squad in March, but was back by April to train with the team. In June, Jackson tore her adductor magnus muscle during the Australian training camp in the Czech Republic. She was one of the models for the 2012 Australian Olympic team uniforms, and chosen to carry the Australian flag during the Opening Ceremony for the 2012 Olympic Games. The hamstring injury prevented Jackson from getting much play during the Olympic tournament, having only had significant court time in the matches against USA and the bronze medal play-off with Russia.

After flying to Australia in February 2014 to operate on her heel and knee, Jackson committed to return to the Opals in time for the 2014 FIBA World Championship for Women. However, the delayed recovery of Jackson's knee led her to give up on the tournament to have her right hip operated on to fix a torn labrum in September 2014. She had gotten the tear while playing for Ros Casares Valencia in 2012 but went without surgery to not miss the then-upcoming Olympics. Jackson would later express interest in attending her fifth Olympic tournament during the 2016 Summer Olympics as a way to close her career, while also pursuing her long-standing dream of a gold medal. However, while attending the Opals training camp in Canberra, she announced her retirement saying her conditions were not improved enough and she needed an "absolute miracle" to get into shape.

Jackson returned to the Australia squad in 2022 for the FIBA Women's Basketball World Cup in Sydney. Australia went on to win the bronze medal, with Jackson recording 30 points and 7 rebounds in their victory over Canada.

In February 2024, Jackson helped the Opals qualify for the 2024 Summer Olympics. She initially intended to retire for a third time after the qualifying tournament, but the following month she was named in the Opals Olympic squad, who accepted her request to bring her children to the Olympics. Jackson had a reduced participation, with only twenty minutes and six points through the tournament, but became the first Australian athlete to win medals in five editions of the Olympic Games once she earned the bronze.

A month after the 2024 Olympics, Jackson underwent a knee replacement. She subsequently retired from international duties for the final time.

== Coaching career ==
Jackson served as head coach of the Albury Wodonga Bandits women's team in the 2019 NBL1 season.

== Health issues ==
Jackson has had multiple injuries. In 2008, after the Olympics, she had surgery to fix her ankle. In 2009, she had two stress fractures in her back. In December 2010, she had an Achilles injury. She sustained the injury playing in Australia. Between January 2011 and February 2012, she had surgeries to assist with Achilles and hip injuries. She had surgery on her left hip acetabular labrum in June 2011 in Vail, Colorado at the Richard Steadman Clinic. She said of the surgery: "This is a really, really tough decision, but after talking with my doctors and my family, we felt that immediate surgery is the best course of action. With something painful like this hip injury, I want to be especially proactive. I plan to stay in Seattle to be here with my team and try my best to be back on the court as soon as possible. My goal is to be at full strength by the end of the season." She did rehabilitation twice a day in an attempt to speed her recovery. Afterwards, Jackson injured her right knee, requiring more surgery in 2012. Another knee injury while playing in China in 2014 degraded into arthritis, and her knee required much surgical intervention during the following years, including a long hospitalisation in January 2016 after her knee joint suffered a postsurgical infection. All the consequences of this knee problem led to Jackson's first retirement from pro basketball in March 2016. During her WNBL return in 2022, Jackson played several games with a broken foot before a tear in her right Achilles ended her season in February 2023.

After retiring, Jackson went through a partial knee reconstruction, and decided to quit the painkillers and sleeping pills that she had been taking since the age of 20 to deal with chronic pain, leading to drug withdrawal. Her unretirement in the 2020s had Jackson using medicinal cannabis to reduce her pain.

== Celebrity ==
By 2003, Jackson was being recognised when in public around the world. She said of her private life: "I don't really have a private life. I've found it difficult as an athlete, to maintain a relationship. It's not one of my best points but I've got family and friends who compensate for that. When I was younger I went out and had a lot of fun, and there were moments when people criticised me for that, and you know what, I'm young, I'm going to do that, and anyone who is going to get on me for that ... I really didn't care." She did not enjoy visits to clubs because she was recognised by too many people, and everyone wanted to comment on her height. She partied a fair amount in her early 20s. By 2010, she was not able to stay out at night clubs until 5:30 am anymore because she lacked the stamina.

In response to getting a hug from Yao Ming at the 2008 Summer Olympics during the closing ceremonies, internet rumours started that Jackson and the married Yao were romantically involved. These rumours were incorrect. Jackson said of them: "When we came across this Yao Ming thing it was like, 'Oh...My...God! When I tell you we were in hysterics...because anybody who knows me knows that would be the last thing on my mind. A 7-foot 6 Chinese man? That's just not my thing. I really respect him as a player. And people who know me know I can be wild and over-the-top. I'm affectionate and that night I guess I was affectionate with the wrong person. I guess the Chinese people don't do that stuff very often, so the cultural [differences] was a big thing. But I don't care. You have to laugh about things or you'll be crying, which I would probably have been doing anyway [because of the loss and surgery]. I made the most of my last night at the Olympics and had a great time."

When people google Jackson, some of the first search results feature her in the nude. Jackson said of this: "Instead of being known for my basketball skills, all of these nudie shots are always the first thing you see." She posed nude in an Australian magazine, Black+White, that featured Olympic athletes who were set to compete in Athens in the 2004 Summer Olympics. The expensively printed magazine/book has been produced for the last three Olympic Games and, by the 2004 edition, was considered uncontroversial in Australia with its "artistic" approach to nude photography, and its equal coverage of male and female athletes, although it did create a stir in the United States. She also posed for the 2005 edition of the Sports Illustrated Swimsuit Issue. Of posing nude, she said, "if offered the opportunity, I think that it's a personal decision. Whether you do it for the money or whatever, again, I think it's a personal decision. I don't know whether I would say yes or no. I guess you cross that bridge when you come to it. I don't think it's a bad thing, I'm not against it."

As Jackson got older, she took on a more activist role, working for domestic violence charities and helping children from Australia's outback get involved in sport. In December 2002, she helped launch the Smith Family Toy Drive at the Canberra Centre with the help of Ainslie school children. She is the patron for the NSW Rape Crisis Centre. She is passionate about preventing domestic abuse. In 2010, she visited young basketball players at Batemans Bay's Moruya Basketball.

== Honours ==
Jackson was named the Australian International Player of the Year in 1999, 2000, 2002, 2004, 2006 and 2008. In 2005, she was inducted into the Australian Institute of Sport's 'Best of the Best'.

In 2011, the Albury Sports Stadium was renamed the Lauren Jackson Sports Centre. A thousand people showed up at the renaming ceremony, at which Jackson was the guest of honour.

Jackson was the flag bearer for Australia at the 2012 Summer Olympics. On 8 June 2015, she was appointed an Officer of the Order of Australia in the Queen's Birthday Honours.

Jackson was inducted into the Women's Basketball Hall of Fame in 2020, the same year in which she was inducted into the Sport Australia Hall of Fame. The following year, she was inducted into the Naismith Memorial Basketball Hall of Fame and was named to the WNBA's 25th anniversary team. Jackson was an inaugural inductee to the University of Canberra Sport Walk of Fame in 2022.

In November 2024, Jackson was honoured at the Sport Australia Hall of Fame Awards, receiving The Dawn Award. The award recognises an individual, team or organisation who "show courage and bravery and have changed sport for the better".

== Personal life ==
Jackson earned her Higher School Certificate in Canberra while she was training with the Australian Institute of Sport. Jackson studied for a psychology degree at Lomonosov Moscow State University and continued via correspondence from America. In 2007, she was working on a university course in business management. In 2010, she was taking classes at Macquarie University in Sydney. Her coursework was centred in cultural studies and included topics such as women's rights and racism. After injuries prevented her from studying, she was again working on her degree in 2012 and had aspirations to become a United Nations diplomat. She also considered becoming an advocate for women. Her interests regarding gender studies were inspired by a book regarding rape during the Rwandan Genocide, and Jackson is an ambassador of a foundation that seeks to empower the abused women of that war. By 2015, Jackson was studying for a Bachelor's degree in Gender and Diversity at the University of Canberra, mostly through distance education.

Jackson's first child was born in 2017. She had a second child in 2018. The father of Jackson's children is pianist Tim Freedman. During the 2024 Paris Olympics, Freedman travelled to France to help care for their children, staying at a nearby hotel while Jackson was based in the Olympic Village.

In 2016, Jackson became the leader of the Australian Basketball Alliance and joined the new ownership group of the Melbourne Boomers. She served as a commentator for the Seven Network during the 2016 Olympics, on studio rather than travelling to the Games because of her pregnancy.

She released an autobiography, My Story: A Life in Basketball and Beyond, in October 2018.

== See also ==
- List of Australian WNBA players

Olympic Games
| Preceded by James Tomkins; Stephanie Rice | Flagbearer for Australia; London 2012 | Succeeded by Anna Meares |
