= Claudia Brassard-Riebesehl =

Canadian basketball player (born 1975)

Tasmania Jewels
- Title: Head coach
- League: WNBL

Personal information
- Born: 3 March 1975 (age 51) Kuala Lumpur, Malaysia
- Listed height: 182 cm (6 ft 0 in)
- Listed weight: 74 kg (163 lb)

Career information
- College: SMU (1995–1999)
- WNBA draft: 1999: undrafted
- Playing career: 1999–2007, 2017
- Position: Forward
- Coaching career: 2013–present

Career history

Playing
- 1999–2000: ABC Limoges
- 2000–2001: Bulleen Boomers
- 2002–2007: Townsville Fire
- 2017: Townsville Flames

Coaching
- 2013–2016: Townsville Fire (assistant)
- 2016–2019: Townsville Fire
- 2018: Townsville Heat (assistant)
- 2024: Townsville Flames (stand-in)
- 2025: Townsville Flames
- 2026–present: Tasmania Jewels

Career highlights
- As head coach: WNBL champion (2018); As assistant coach: 2× WNBL champion (2015, 2016)

Claudia Melati Brassard-Riebesehl (born 3 March 1975) is a Canadian basketball coach and former player who currently serves as head coach of the Tasmania Jewels of the Women's National Basketball League (WNBL). She debuted in the WNBL in 2000 with the Bulleen Boomers before joining the Townsville Fire in 2002, where she played five seasons, including three as captain. In 2013, she joined the Fire as an assistant coach. As head coach of the club in 2018, she guided the Fire to the WNBL championship.

Brassard competed for the Canada women's national basketball team at the 2000 Summer Olympics.

== Early life ==
Brassard was born in Kuala Lumpur, Malaysia. Her hometown was Saint-Hilarion, Quebec.

== College career ==
Brassard played college basketball in the United States for the SMU Mustangs between 1995 and 1999.

== Professional career ==
Brassard's first professional season in 1999–2000 was spent with ABC Limoges of the French Ligue Féminine de Basketball.

After representing Canada in the Sydney Olympics in 2000, Brassard and her husband went backpacking around Australia. Upon discovering that Women's National Basketball League (WNBL) club the Bulleen Boomers had an open import position available, she rang the club, showed up to practice and joined the team for the 2000–01 WNBL season. After one season with the Boomers, she had a year off following the birth of her daughter.

In 2002, Brassard linked up with the Townsville Fire through a contact from a college friend. She played five seasons for the Fire, including captaining the team in 2004–05, 2005–06 and 2006–07.

In 2017, Brassard came out of retirement to help the Townsville Flames in the Queensland Basketball League (QBL).

== National team career ==
Brassard competed for the Canada women's national basketball team at the 2000 Summer Olympics and 2006 FIBA World Championship.

== Coaching career ==
Brassard served as the Townsville Fire's senior assistant between 2013 and 2016 before being appointed head coach for the 2016–17 WNBL season, where she led the Fire to the semi-finals. In the 2017–18 season, she guided the Fire to a 2–1 grand final series victory over the Melbourne Boomers to win the WNBL championship. She stepped down as head coach following the 2018–19 season.

In 2018, Brassard joined the Townsville Heat men's team as assistant coach for the QBL finals.

In 2018, Brassard served as assistant coach of the Australian Gems at the FIBA Under-18 Women's Asian Championship. She continued as assistant with the Gems at the 2019 FIBA Under-19 Women's Basketball World Cup.

Brassard coached the Townsville Flames in a handful of games during the 2024 NBL1 North season when head coach James Rapinett was unavailable. She was subsequently appointed head coach of the Flames for the 2025 season.

On 2 March 2026, Brassard was named the inaugural head coach of the Tasmania Jewels for the 2026–27 WNBL season.

== Personal life ==
Brassard holds Canadian, German, Malaysian and Australian nationality.

Brassard's husband, Mike St-Maurice, was coach of the Townsville Flames of the QBL in 2017. As of November 2016, Brassard had two children.

In 2024, Brassard was appointed deputy chair of Basketball Queensland.
