= Liv Lewis =

Australian netball player (born 1999)

Olivia Lewis
- Born: Olivia Rose Lewis; 29 April 1999 (age 27); Perth Western Australia
- Education: Kolbe Catholic College
- Height: 1.84 m (6 ft 0 in)
- Netball career
- Playing positions: GK, GD
Years	Club team	Apps
2019–2021	West Coast Fever	27
2022–2023	Melbourne Vixens	24
2024–2025	Melbourne Mavericks	28
2014–2018	Western Australia	46
2016–2019	Western Sting	36
2022	Victoria Fury	6
Australian rules football career
Club information
- Current club: Collingwood
- Number: 33
Playing career^{1}
Years	Club	Games (Goals)
2026–	Collingwood	3 (1)
- ^{1} Playing statistics correct to the end of the 2026 season.

Olivia Lewis (born 29 April 1999) is an Australian netball player in the Suncorp Super Netball league, playing for the Melbourne Mavericks.

Lewis attended Kolbe Catholic College in Rockingham, Western Australia.

Lewis was signed by the West Coast Fever ahead of the 2019 season. The defender grew up playing netball for the Rockingham District Netball Association before moving to Coastal Sharks academy in Western Australia.

A junior talent saw her win national MVP awards at under 17 and 19 levels. Prior to being picked up by the Fever, she was MVP for the club's reserves team, the Western Sting in the Australian Netball League, and was a part of their maiden ANL premiership in 2017. Playing in the Western Australian Netball league, Olivia was awarded the Jill McIntosh medal as the Most Valuable player for the 2018 season.

She made her Suncorp super netball debut in round 1 of 2019 against Adelaide Thunderbirds. A promising first season saw her take to the court nine times and receive the Fever Coaches Award, culminating in her being selected for the 2019 Australian Development squad. In 2020, she was impressive enough in her ten appearances to be selected again in the Australian Development squad for 2020/2021. In 2021, her eight appearances were as an impact player with very little court time. However, she was again selected in the 2021/22 Australian Development squad.

She signed with the Melbourne Vixens for the 2022 season, debuting in round 1 as Vixens player 59. She was part of a resurgent Vixens team, taking to the court 12 times, including in their unsuccessful Grand Final against Fever. Olivia was named joint captain of Victoria Fury for their 2022 campaign in the Australian Netball Championships leading them into the Gold medal match against South Australian Force. Given more court time in 2023, Olivia made a name for herself for handling the taller goal shooters of the competition.

Liv was recruited as one of the startup players with the new franchise, Melbourne Mavericks for 2024, and elected into the leadership group. Again, tasked with negating tall holding shooters, she famously blocked the shot of 201 cm Firebirds shooter Mary Cholhok numerous times in a 2025 match despite giving away 17 cm. After the 2025 season, Olivia was the only member of the original squad, along with Kim Brown (Jenner), who had played every game since the formation of the Mavericks. She received the 2025 club's defender of the year award before sensationally revealing that she was leaving the Mavericks to take up Australian rules football.

In November 2025, AFL Women's club Collingwood announced signing Lewis on a two-year rookie contract.

She is a member of the LGBTQIA+ community.
