= 2022 NBL1 season =

- League: NBL1
- Sport: Basketball
- Duration: 2 April – 3 September (Conference seasons); 9–11 September (NBL1 National Finals)

National Finals
- Champions: M: Rockingham Flames; W: Warwick Senators
- Runners-up: M: Frankston Blues; W: Ringwood Hawks
- Grand Final MVP: M: Ryan Godfrey (Rockingham Flames); W: Leonie Fiebich (Warwick Senators)

NBL1 seasons
- ← 2021 2023 →

The 2022 NBL1 season was the third season of the NBL1. With the West Conference introduced in 2021 alongside the South, North and Central conferences, the NBL1 expanded further in 2022 with the inclusion of an East Conference.

The 2022 season was the NBL1's first full season to be completed since 2019 and the first to feature the NBL1 National Finals.

The inaugural NBL1 National champions were both from the West Conference, with the Warwick Senators women and the Rockingham Flames men coming out victorious at the National Finals in Melbourne.

== Background ==
The NBL1 had expanded in 2021 with the West Conference introduced alongside the South, North and Central conferences. In 2022, the NBL1 expanded to five conferences after partnering with Basketball New South Wales to make the Waratah League the new East Conference.

An additional conference, known as the NBL1 Wildcard Series, was introduced in 2022 after a partnership with Basketball Australia saw the Centre of Excellence feature in one-off games against the top teams from all five NBL1 State Conferences of the prior year. 20 men's and 16 women's games were played in the Wildcard Conference. The team who finished on top of the NBL1 Wildcard ladder, based on points percentage, were granted entry as the sixth women's and men's teams in the 2022 NBL1 National Finals alongside the State Conference champions.

== Conference seasons ==
The season began on 2 April for the East Conference, 8 April for the West Conference, 9 April for the Central Conference, 10 April for the Wildcard Conference, 21 April for the South Conference and 29 April for the North Conference. All conference finals were concluded by 3 September.

=== South ===
The women's minor premiers were the Bendigo Braves with a 20–2 record while the men's minor premiers were the Hobart Chargers with a 17–5 record. Alicia Froling of the Knox Raiders was named women's MVP while Shea Ili of the Sandringham Sabres was named men's MVP.

The women's grand final saw the Ringwood Hawks defeat the Bendigo Braves 89–73 while the men's grand final saw the Hobart Chargers defeat the Mount Gambier Pioneers 78–62. Marena Whittle of the Ringwood Hawks was named women's grand final MVP while Sam McDaniel of the Hobart Chargers was named men's grand final MVP.

=== North ===
A club from Darwin, Northern Territory, the Darwin Salties, joined the North Conference in 2022 which saw the NBL1 become the first Australian sport league to have clubs based in and playing out of every state and territory in Australia.

The women's minor premiers were the Logan Thunder with a 19–0 record while the men's minor premiers were the Gold Coast Rollers with a 14–5 record. Tiana Mangakahia of the Northside Wizards was named women's MVP while Kouat Noi of the USC Rip City was named men's MVP.

The women's grand final series saw the Townsville Flames defeat the Logan Thunder 2–0, with 85–57 in game one and 80–48 in game two, while the men's grand final series saw the Gold Coast Rollers defeat the USC Rip City 2–0, with 101–86 in game one and 118–71 in game two. Stephanie Reid of the Townsville Flames was named women's grand final MVP while Jason Cadee of the Gold Coast Rollers was named men's grand final MVP.

=== Central ===
The women's minor premiers were the West Adelaide Bearcats with a 15–3 record while the men's minor premiers were the Woodville Warriors with a 15–3 record. Samantha Simons of the Forestville Eagles was named women's MVP while Jeremy Smith of the South Adelaide Panthers was named men's MVP.

The women's grand final saw the West Adelaide Bearcats defeat the Sturt Sabres 82–75 while the men's grand final saw the South Adelaide Panthers defeat the Woodville Warriors 88–58. Madelynn Utti of the West Adelaide Bearcats was named women's grand final MVP while Alex Starling of the South Adelaide Panthers was named men's grand final MVP.

=== West ===
The women's minor premiers were the Warwick Senators with an 18–2 record while the men's minor premiers were the Geraldton Buccaneers with a 19–3 record. Stacey Barr of the Warwick Senators was named women's MVP while Devondrick Walker of the Rockingham Flames was named men's MVP.

The women's grand final saw the Warwick Senators defeat the Willetton Tigers 87–61 while the men's grand final saw the Rockingham Flames defeat the Geraldton Buccaneers 91–79. Leonie Fiebich of the Warwick Senators was named women's grand final MVP while Devondrick Walker of the Rockingham Flames was named men's grand final MVP.

=== East ===
The women's minor premiers were the Albury Wodonga Bandits with an 17–3 record while the men's minor premiers were the Canberra Gunners with a 16–6 record. Lauren Jackson of the Albury Wodonga Bandits was named women's MVP while Kiwi Gardner of the Illawarra Hawks was named men's MVP.

The women's grand final saw the Albury Wodonga Bandits defeat the Sutherland Sharks 85–72 while the men's grand final saw the Canberra Gunners defeat the Maitland Mustangs 76–73. Unique Thompson of the Albury Wodonga Bandits was named women's grand final MVP while Glenn Morison of the Canberra Gunners was named men's grand final MVP.

=== Wildcard ===
The BA Centre of Excellence women recorded a 10–6 record in their 16 Wildcard games while the men's team recorded a 15–5 record in their 20 Wildcard games.

The Southern Districts Spartans from the North Conference finished on top of the Wildcard women's ladder while the Frankston Blues from the South Conference finished on top of the Wildcard men's ladder. Both teams were subsequently granted entry into the NBL1 National Finals.

=== Champions summary ===
==== Women ====
Conference	Champion	Result	Runner-up
South	Ringwood Hawks	89 – 73	Bendigo Braves
North	Townsville Flames	2 – 0 (85–57, 80–48)	Logan Thunder
Central	West Adelaide Bearcats	82 – 75	Sturt Sabres
West	Warwick Senators	87 – 61	Willetton Tigers
East	Albury Wodonga Bandits	85 – 72	Sutherland Sharks
Wildcard	Southern Districts Spartans (North)		

==== Men ====
Conference	Champion	Result	Runner-up
South	Hobart Chargers	78 – 62	Mount Gambier Pioneers
North	Gold Coast Rollers	2 – 0 (101–86, 118–71)	USC Rip City
Central	South Adelaide Panthers	88 – 58	Woodville Warriors
West	Rockingham Flames	91 – 79	Geraldton Buccaneers
East	Canberra Gunners	76 – 73	Maitland Mustangs
Wildcard	Frankston Blues (South)		

== National Finals ==
The 2022 NBL1 National Finals took place at the State Basketball Centre in Melbourne between Friday 9 September and Sunday 11 September. It served as the inaugural National Finals after the 2021 event was cancelled due to the COVID-19 pandemic.

The champions from each of the five conferences, plus the Wildcard conference winners, faced off on Friday and Saturday for a spot in the Championship Games on Sunday. Each team played two preliminary games in which they generated ranking points, with the top two ranked women's and men's teams then playing in the Championship Game.

Ranking points over the first two days included three points for a win, one point for each quarter won, and half a point for tied quarters. The schedule for Friday was determined by a random draw. On Saturday, the highest point scorer from Friday played fifth place, the second highest played fourth place, and the third highest played sixth place. On Sunday, the top two point scores over Friday and Saturday played in the Championship Game, while third place to sixth place competed in consolation games.

Both West Conference teams were victorious in the Championship Games, with the Warwick Senators women and the Rockingham Flames men becoming the inaugural NBL1 National champions.

=== Day One – Friday ===
==== Women ====
- Central vs West

9 September 2022
6:00 pm

Box score
Report

West Adelaide Bearcats 61, Warwick Senators 86
Scoring by quarter: 10–19, 16–30, 12–20, 23–17
Pts: Jasmin Fejo 17; Rebs: Madelynn Utti 14; Asts: Jasmin Fejo 5	Pts: Stacey Barr 25; Rebs: Leonie Fiebich 14; Asts: Hoycard, Jorre 6 each
After Day 1: West Adelaide 5th (1 pt), Warwick 2nd (6 pts)

Court 3, State Basketball Centre, Melbourne

- Wildcard vs North

9 September 2022
6:15 pm

Box score
Report

Southern Districts Spartans 67, Townsville Flames 80
Scoring by quarter: 15–23, 24–18, 16–17, 12–22
Pts: Leah Scott 32; Rebs: Leah Scott 10; Asts: Natalie Taylor 4	Pts: Stephanie Reid 32; Rebs: Courtney Woods 11; Asts: Stephanie Reid 7
After Day 1: Southern Districts 4th (1 pt), Townsville 3rd (6 pts)

Court 2, State Basketball Centre, Melbourne

- East vs South

9 September 2022
6:30 pm

Box score
Report

Albury Wodonga Bandits 56, Ringwood Hawks 97
Scoring by quarter: 18–23, 14–26, 13–20, 11–28
Pts: Unique Thompson 24; Rebs: Unique Thompson 16; Asts: Ai Yamada 6	Pts: Marena Whittle 25; Rebs: Marena Whittle 19; Asts: Toni Farnworth 8
After Day 1: Albury Wodonga 6th (0 pts), Ringwood 1st (7 pts)

Court 1, State Basketball Centre, Melbourne

==== Men ====
- West vs Central

9 September 2022
8:00 pm

Box score
Report

Rockingham Flames 87, South Adelaide Panthers 71
Scoring by quarter: 17–24, 31–13, 17–14, 22–20
Pts: Ryan Godfrey 26; Rebs: Tom Jervis 12; Asts: Travis Durnin 4	Pts: Jeremy Smith 21; Rebs: Jeremy Smith 11; Asts: Jeremy Smith 5
After Day 1: Rockingham 1st (6 pts), South Adelaide 6th (1 pt)

Court 3, State Basketball Centre, Melbourne

- South vs North

9 September 2022
8:15 pm

Box score
Report

Hobart Chargers 86, Gold Coast Rollers 92
Scoring by quarter: 19–28, 12–30, 34–13, 21–21
Pts: Angerstein, Howard 19 each Rebs: Ole Angerstein 15; Asts: A. J. Harris 8	Pts: Eustace, Patterson 19 each Rebs: Lamar Patterson 14; Asts: Lamar Patterson 8
After Day 1: Hobart 5th (1.5 pts), Gold Coast 2nd (5.5 pts)

Court 2, State Basketball Centre, Melbourne

- Wildcard vs East

9 September 2022
8:30 pm

Box score
Report

Frankston Blues 89, Canberra Gunners 86
Scoring by quarter: 13–22, 19–23, 27–23, 30–18
Pts: Lachlan Barker 38; Rebs: Adrio Bailey 10; Asts: Lachlan Barker, MacDonald, Peirce 3 each	Pts: Glenn Morison 22; Rebs: Akech Aliir 8 Asts: Akech Aliir 4
After Day 1: Frankston 3rd (5 pts), Canberra 4th (2 pts)

Court 1, State Basketball Centre, Melbourne

=== Day Two – Saturday ===
==== Women ====
- 2nd vs 4th

10 September 2022
4:00 pm

Box score
Report

Warwick Senators 88, Southern Districts Spartans 73
Scoring by quarter: 23–20, 19–12, 21–18, 25–23
Pts: Stacey Barr 33; Rebs: Leonie Fiebich 13; Asts: Chloe Forster 7	Pts: Leah Scott 26; Rebs: Kalani Purcell 10; Asts: Scott, Allen 4 each
After Day 2: Warwick 2nd (13 pts), Southern Districts 5th (1 pt)

Court 3, State Basketball Centre, Melbourne

- 1st vs 5th

10 September 2022
4:15 pm

Box score
Report

Ringwood Hawks 90, West Adelaide Bearcats 55
Scoring by quarter: 23–11, 24–16, 19–12, 24–16
Pts: Marena Whittle 31; Rebs: Whittle, Trotto 9 each Asts: Marta Hermida 7	Pts: Madelynn Utti 13; Rebs: Madelynn Utti 13; Asts: Utti, Fejo 4 each
After Day 2: Ringwood 1st (14 pts), West Adelaide 6th (1 pt)

Court 2, State Basketball Centre, Melbourne

- 3rd vs 6th

10 September 2022
4:30 pm

Box score
Report

Townsville Flames 67, Albury Wodonga Bandits 73
Scoring by quarter: 17–23, 15–13, 21–18, 14–19
Pts: Courtney Woods 20; Rebs: Seebohm, Rodgers 9 each Asts: Courtney Woods 4	Pts: Unique Thompson 25; Rebs: Unique Thompson 10; Asts: Ai Yamada 9
After Day 2: Townsville 3rd (8 pts), Albury Wodonga 4th (5 pts)

Court 1, State Basketball Centre, Melbourne

==== Men ====
- 2nd vs 4th

10 September 2022
6:00 pm

Box score
Report

Gold Coast Rollers 91, Canberra Gunners 101
Scoring by quarter: 18–36, 22–19, 23–21, 28–25
Pts: Lamar Patterson 32; Rebs: Devon Sullivan 11; Asts: Rigby, Patterson 3 each	Pts: James Toohey 21; Rebs: Glenn Morison 13; Asts: Mills, Mayfield 7 each
After Day 2: Gold Coast 3rd (8.5 pts), Canberra 4th (6 pt)

Court 3, State Basketball Centre, Melbourne

- 1st vs 5th

10 September 2022
6:15 pm

Box score
Report

Rockingham Flames 102, Hobart Chargers 87
Scoring by quarter: 23–20, 24–16, 34–28, 21–23
Pts: Marshall Nelson 29; Rebs: Justin Beard 11; Asts: Tom Jervis 5	Pts: Ole Angerstein 20; Rebs: Ole Angerstein 11; Asts: Jamar Sandifer 5
After Day 2: Rockingham 1st (12 pts), Hobart 6th (2.5 pts)

Court 2, State Basketball Centre, Melbourne

- 3rd vs 6th

10 September 2022
6:30 pm

Box score
Report

Frankston Blues 95, South Adelaide Panthers 90
Scoring by quarter: 39–22, 14–20, 23–23, 19–25
Pts: Lachlan Barker 23; Rebs: Adrio Bailey 11; Asts: Lucas Barker 9	Pts: Jeremy Smith 30; Rebs: Alex Starling 8 Asts: Samuel Johns 4
After Day 2: Frankston 2nd (9.5 pts), South Adelaide 5th (3.5 pts)

Court 1, State Basketball Centre, Melbourne

=== Day Three – Sunday ===
==== Consolation Games ====
===== Women =====
- 3rd vs 6th

11 September 2022
10:00 am

Box score
Report

Townsville Flames 97, West Adelaide Bearcats 70
Scoring by quarter: 21–22, 26–17, 36–14, 14–17
Pts: Courtney Woods 25; Rebs: Mia Murray 7 Asts: Stephanie Reid 10	Pts: Madelynn Utti 29; Rebs: Madelynn Utti 11; Asts: Mia Valk 6

Court 2, State Basketball Centre, Melbourne

- 4th vs 5th

11 September 2022
10:00 am

Box score
Report

Albury Wodonga Bandits 69, Southern Districts Spartans 109
Scoring by quarter: 19–32, 20–31, 15–27, 15–19
Pts: Unique Thompson 36; Rebs: Unique Thompson 14; Asts: Ai Yamada 6	Pts: Scott, Allen 21 each Rebs: Kalani Purcell 11; Asts: Madelyn Allen 9

Court 3, State Basketball Centre, Melbourne

===== Men =====
- 3rd vs 5th

11 September 2022
12:00 pm

Box score
Report

Gold Coast Rollers 102, South Adelaide Panthers 72
Scoring by quarter: 16–21, 27–13, 36–23, 23–15
Pts: Jaze Morris 23; Rebs: Elijah Kamu 9 Asts: Rigby, Patterson, McKewin 6 each	Pts: Jarryd Hoppo 13; Rebs: Jarryd Hoppo 15; Asts: Kazlo Evans 7

Court 2, State Basketball Centre, Melbourne

- 4th vs 6th

11 September 2022
12:00 pm

Box score
Report

Canberra Gunners 93, Hobart Chargers 72
Scoring by quarter: 25–20, 20–17, 28–19, 20–16
Pts: William Mayfield 20; Rebs: Glenn Morison 10; Asts: William Mayfield 4	Pts: Jacob Richards 24; Rebs: Ole Angerstein 10; Asts: Jack Stanwix 4

Court 3, State Basketball Centre, Melbourne

==== Championship Games ====
===== Women =====
====== Rosters ======
Ringwood Hawks – 1st
#	Player
Starters
7	Toni Farnworth
20	Marta Hermida
21	Marena Whittle
24	Jacqueline Trotto
45	Digna Strautmane
Reserves
3	Zoe Jenkins
4	Danni Allen (C)
5	Kiahna Liddy
8	Tayah Kelly
13	Rebecca Horvat
15	Bella Niven-Brown
22	Jenna Anderson
Pos	Coach
HC	Tim Mottin
AC	Jeremy O'Toole
AC	Peter Hynson

Warwick Senators – 2nd
#	Player
Starters
9	Natalie Burton
10	Stacey Barr
11	Chloe Forster
12	Mackenzie Clinch Hoycard
13	Leonie Fiebich
Reserves
0	Emma Berryman
7	Hayley Alone
14	Nicole Jorre de St Jorre (C)
18	Alyssa Duncan
Pos	Coach
HC	Jonelle Morley
AC	Marcus Bardill

====== Game summary ======
Kayo Sports

11 September 2022
11:00 am

Box score
Report
Highlights

Ringwood Hawks 75, Warwick Senators 83
Scoring by quarter: 13–15, 21–31, 21–16, 20–21
Pts: Marena Whittle 26; Rebs: Marena Whittle 9 Asts: Toni Farnworth 5	Pts: Chloe Forster 18; Rebs: Leonie Fiebich 18; Asts: Leonie Fiebich 7
Warwick wins NBL1 National Championship

Court 1, State Basketball Centre, Melbourne
MVP: Leonie Fiebich (Senators)

===== Men =====
====== Rosters ======
Rockingham Flames – 1st
#	Player
Starters
3	Ryan Godfrey (C)
10	Justin Beard
12	Travis Durnin
13	Tom Jervis
20	Marshall Nelson
Reserves
5	Jake Amos
7	Harrison Bowater
14	Callum Beard
21	Jack Felstead
22	Samuel Bray
31	Dean Supljeglav
32	Apanyjwok Abuy
Pos	Coach
HC	Ryan Petrik
AC	Bradley New
AC	Cameron Redhead

Frankston Blues – 2nd
#	Player
Starters
3	Igor Hadziomerovic (C)
8	Lachlan Barker
11	Lucas Barker
22	Adrio Bailey
23	Dillon Stith
Reserves
1	Anthony Karabatsos
2	Josh Cleary
4	Will Peirce
7	Alister MacDonald
14	Jarryd Moss
15	Henry Peirce
25	Daniel Trist
Pos	Coach
HC	Andrew Harms
AC	Adam Jackson
AC	Duncan Berg

====== Game summary ======
Kayo Sports

11 September 2022
2:00 pm

Box score
Report
Highlights

Rockingham Flames 85, Frankston Blues 74
Scoring by quarter: 28–19, 12–26, 25–18, 20–11
Pts: Marshall Nelson 26; Rebs: Justin Beard 10; Asts: Marshall Nelson 5	Pts: Adrio Bailey 28; Rebs: Adrio Bailey 12; Asts: Lucas Barker 6
Rockingham wins NBL1 National Championship

Court 1, State Basketball Centre, Melbourne
MVP: Ryan Godfrey (Flames)

=== All-Star Five ===
==== Women ====
- Stacey Barr (Warwick Senators)
- Leonie Fiebich (Warwick Senators)
- Leah Scott (Southern Districts Spartans)
- Unique Thompson (Albury Wodonga Bandits)
- Marena Whittle (Ringwood Hawks)

==== Men ====
- Lachlan Barker (Frankston Blues)
- Dhal Fieg (Canberra Gunners)
- Marshall Nelson (Rockingham Flames)
- Lamar Patterson (Gold Coast Rollers)
- Jeremy Smith (South Adelaide Panthers)
