= Silverdome (Launceston) =

Velodrome in Launceston, Tasmania

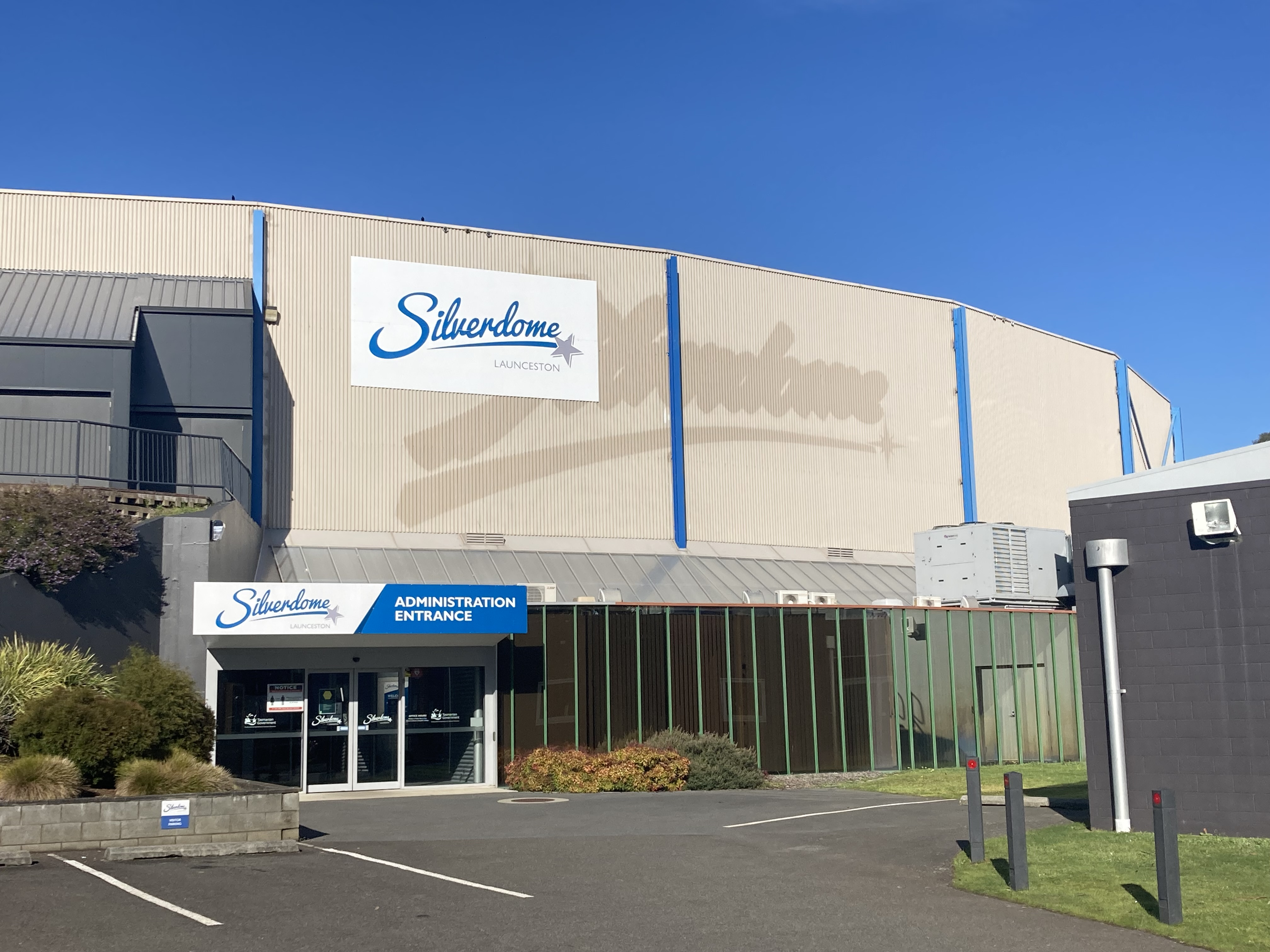
- Interactive map of Silverdome
- Former names: Tasmanian International Velodrome
- Location: Launceston, Tasmania
- Coordinates: 41°28′31″S 147°8′24″E
- Capacity: 5,000; 3,260 (basketball)

Construction
- Groundbreaking: 1984
- Opened: 1985

Tenants
- New Zealand Breakers (NBL) (2020–2021); Collingwood Magpies (SSN) (2017-2023); Tasmanian Magpies (ANL) (2017-2019); Southern Huskies (NZNBL) (2019); Tasmania JackJumpers (NBL) (2021–present); Tasmania Jewels (WNBL) (2026-present)

The Silverdome is an indoor sporting and entertainment venue located in Launceston, Tasmania. The capacity of the venue is 5,000. When it was built in 1984, it was Australia's first indoor velodrome.

== History ==
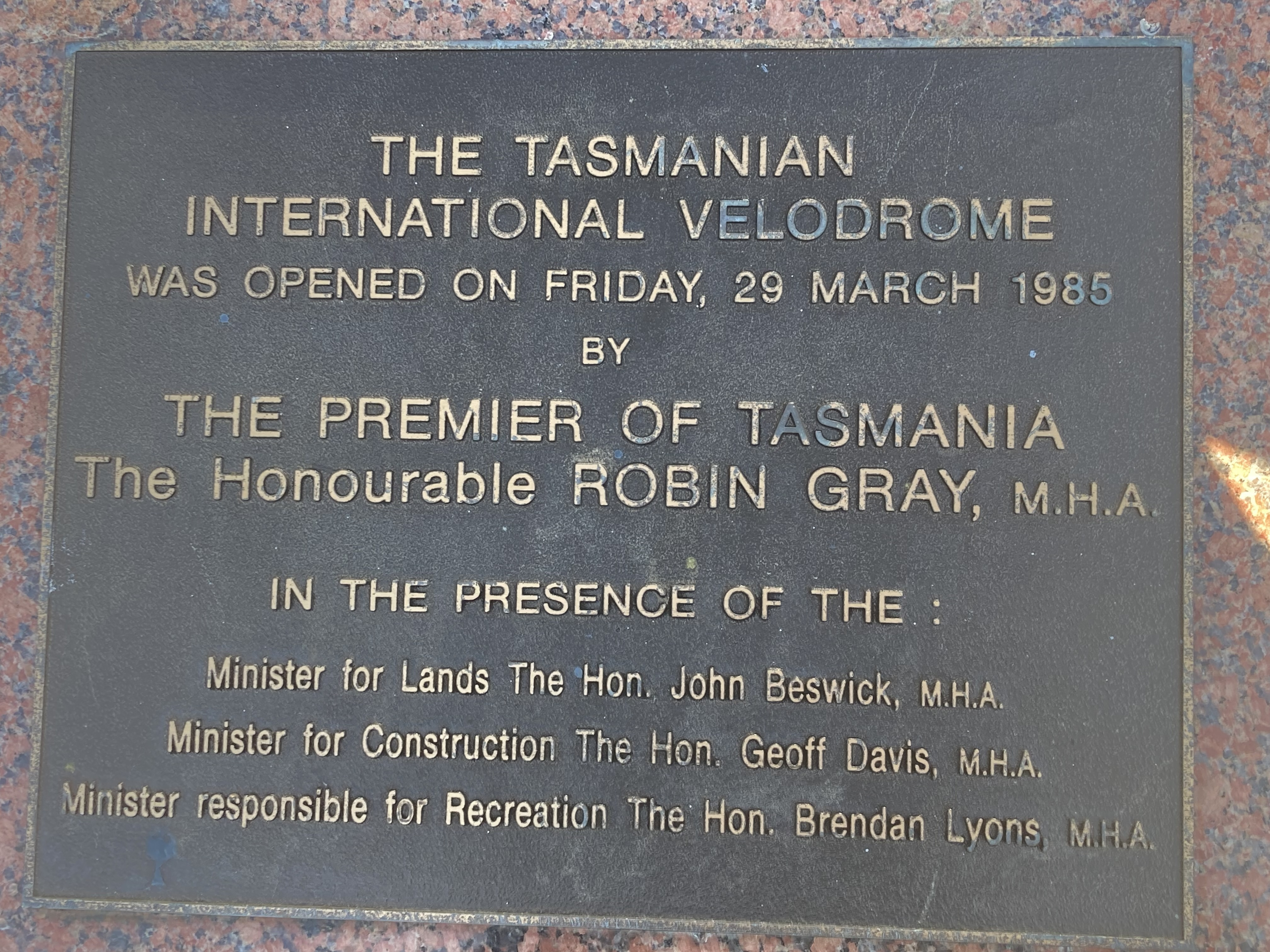
Plaque commemorating the venue's official opening

The Silverdome was built at an estimated cost of A$4 million, as the Tasmanian Government "proposed a world class facility" to replace the run down velodrome in the Launceston suburb of St Leonards. In January 1985, the facility's opening coincided with the City of Launceston Cycling Club Championships. Although "custom built for cycling", the Silverdome has hosted various concerts and other sporting events.

The Collingwood Magpies netball team, which formerly competed in the Super Netball league, played a home match each season at the venue.

== Tenants ==
After hosting games during the NBL Blitz the season prior, on 3 March 2021 the National Basketball League announced that the venue would host six games during the 2020–21 NBL season in preparation for the Tasmania JackJumpers joining the league the following season. The first match was held on 13 April when the New Zealand Breakers lost to the Perth Wildcats in overtime. Since the 2021–22 NBL season, the JackJumpers host two games per season at the arena.

== See also ==
- List of cycling tracks and velodromes
