= Albury Wodonga Bandits =

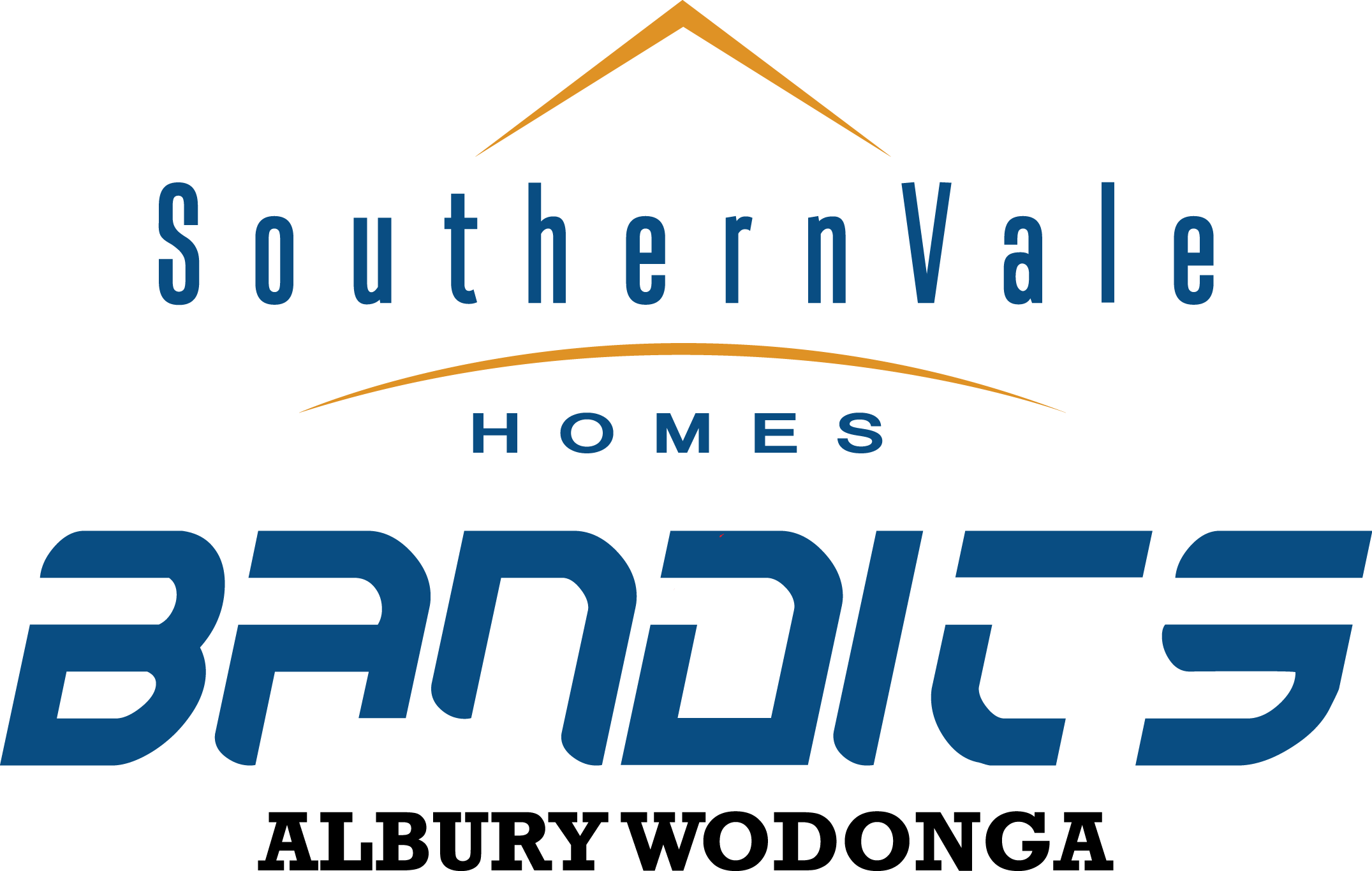
- Leagues: NBL1 East
- Founded: 1984
- History: Men: Wodonga Border Bulldogs; 1984–1985; Albury Wodonga Bandits; 1986–present Women: Albury Wodonga Bandits; 2006–present
- Arena: Lauren Jackson Sports Centre
- Location: Albury, New South Wales
- Team colors: Black (home) and Grey (away)
- Main sponsor: Southern Vale Homes
- President: Mark Bywater
- Vice-president: Rod Paul
- Head coach: M: Matt Kowalczyk; W: Sam McDonald
- Championships: Men: SEABL (1): 2012; Women: NBL1 East (1): 2022
- Conference titles: Men: SEABL (3): 2001; 2012; 2015
- Website: NBL1.com.au

Albury Wodonga Bandits is a NBL1 East club based in Albury, New South Wales. The club fields a team in both the Men's and Women's NBL1 East. The Bandits play their home games at the Lauren Jackson Sports Centre. For sponsorship reasons, the two teams are known as the Southern Vale Homes Bandits.

== Club history ==
In 1984, a team known as the Wodonga Border Bulldogs entered the South East Australian Basketball League (SEABL). Based out of the Victorian city of Wodonga, the Bulldogs' home venue was the Wodonga Sports and Leisure Centre. The Wodonga stadium was the original home court in 1984 before the venue split games with the newly constructed Albury Sports Stadium the following year. The Bulldogs' final game they hosted at the Wodonga Sports and Leisure Centre was on 25 August 1985 before changing their name to the Albury Wodonga Bandits in 1986 and re-locating to nearby Albury.

After experiencing little success over their first 17 seasons in the SEABL, the Bandits won the East Conference championship in 2001 behind coach Leigh Gooding and players Allen McCowan, Matt Sheehan, Russell Hinder, Nick Grylewicz and Nick Payne.

In 2006, an Albury Wodonga Bandits women's team entered the SEABL. After missing the playoffs in each of their first three seasons, the Lady Bandits qualified for the post-season for the first time in 2009 behind coach Kennedy Kereama and star import duo Lisa Wallbutton and Toni Edmondson. Heading into the 2014 season, the Lady Bandits had a 39–153 win–loss record.

In 2012, the Bandits men won the South Conference title and the overall SEABL championship. In 2015, the men's team won the East Conference championship before going on to lose in the SEABL Grand Final to the Mount Gambier Pioneers.

In 2019, following the demise of the SEABL, the Bandits joined the NBL1 for its inaugural season. After playing in the NBL1 South in 2021, the Bandits joined the NBL1 East in 2022. The women's team won the NBL1 East championship in the 2022 season behind Lauren Jackson and Unique Thompson.

In 2024, the Bandits women became the first team in NBL1 East history to go undefeated during the regular season. They went on to lose two straight finals games to bow out of the playoffs.
