= Kolbe Catholic College, Rockingham =

School in Rockingham, Western Australia

Kolbe Catholic College
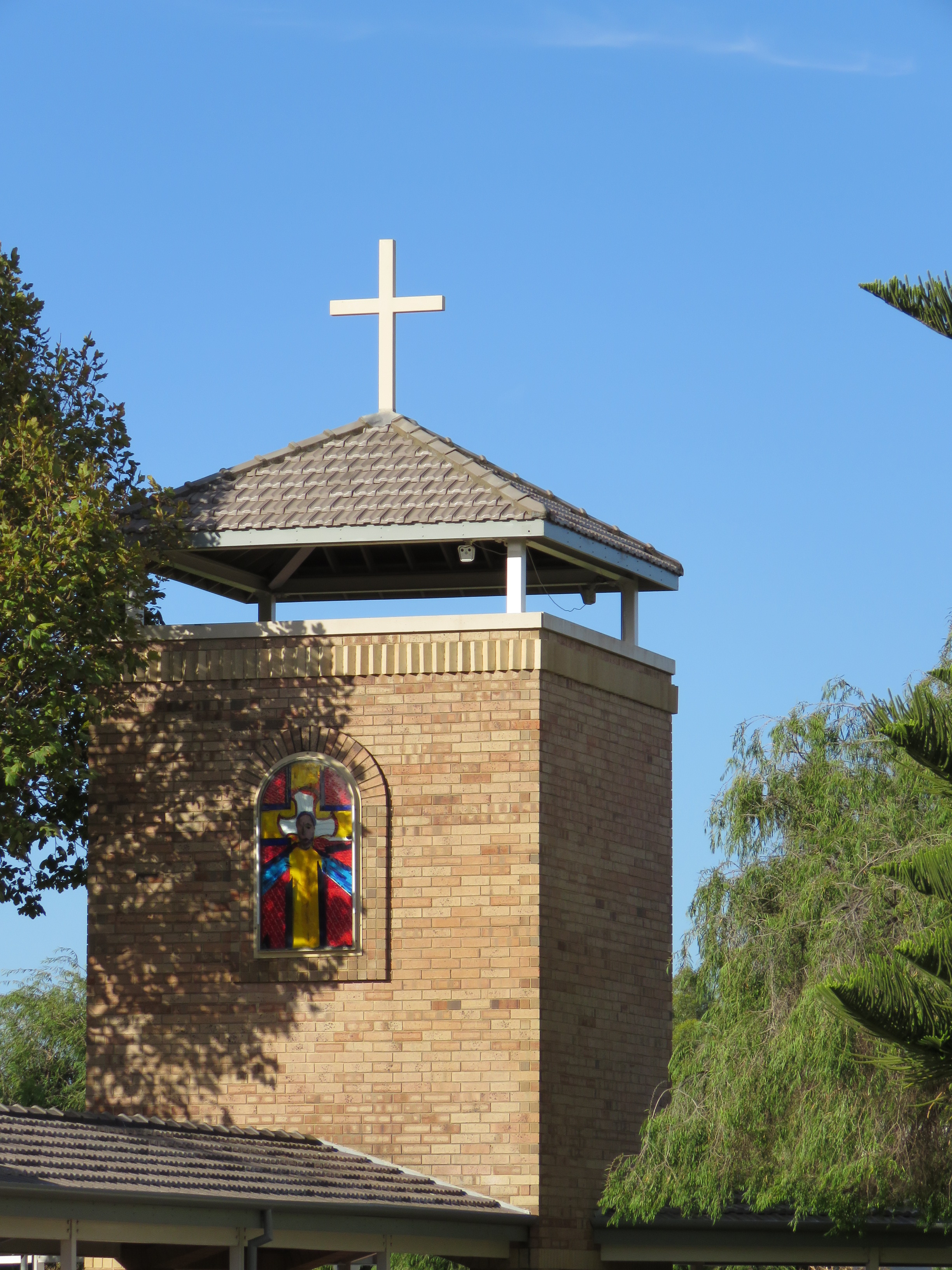
- Bell Tower of Kolbe Catholic College in 2021

Location
- Rockingham, Western Australia; Australia; 32°16′48″S 115°45′12″E

Information
- Type: Independent co-educational secondary day school
- Motto: Courage, Faith, and above all, Excellence
- Denomination: Roman Catholic
- Patron saint: Maximilian Kolbe
- Principal: Neil Alweyn
- Years: Year 7–12
- Enrolment: 1,200 (2022)
- Website: www.kolbe.wa.edu.au

Kolbe Catholic College is an independent Roman Catholic co-educational secondary day school, located in the Perth suburb of Rockingham, Western Australia within the Archdiocese of Perth.

== Overview ==
The College was founded in 1989 by Brother Pat Carey, of the Order of the Christian Brothers, in Rockingham. The school has a current enrollment of more than 1200 students from Years 7 to 12. The College's motto, "Courage, Faith, and above all, Excellence", is inspired by their patron, Saint Maximilian Kolbe. The College is recognised as an Apple Distinguished School and operates a 1:1 iPad Program for middle school students.

The College is in close vicinity to the Mike Barnett Sports Complex, Rockingham Aquatic Centre and Transperth Bus Station. Murdoch University's campus and Murdoch Community Library are located immediately behind the College.

== Houses ==
There are six houses at Kolbe Catholic College:

House	Colour	Name origin
Chisholm	Red	Named after Caroline Chisholm.
Loyola	Purple	Named after Saint Ignatius of Loyola
MacKillop	Yellow	Named after Saint Mary MacKillop
Rice	Green	Named after Edmund Ignatius Rice
Teresa	Blue	Named after Saint Teresa of Calcutta
Xavier	Teal	Named after Saint Francis Xavier

== Notable alumni ==
- Aaron Naughton (born 1999), Australian rules footballer
- Kate Bartlett (born 1999), Australian rules footballer
- Darcee Garbin (born 1994), basketball player
- Sophie Garbin (born 1997), netball player
- Olivia Lewis (born 1999), netball player
- Chelsea Randall (born 1991), Australian rules footballer

== See also ==
- Kolbe Catholic College, Greenvale
- List of schools in the Perth metropolitan area
- Catholic education in Australia
