= Kolbe Catholic College, Greenvale =

Kolbe Catholic College

Location
- Greenvale Lakes, Melbourne, Victoria; Australia; 37°36′54″S 144°54′34″E

Information
- Type: Independent co-educational secondary day school
- Religious affiliation: Roman Catholic
- Patron saint: Maximilian Kolbe
- Established: 2008; 18 years ago
- Principal: Nick Scully
- Years: 7–12
- Enrollment: 1262

Kolbe Catholic College is an independent Roman Catholic co-educational secondary day school, located in the outer Melbourne suburb of Greenvale Lakes, in Victoria, Australia. The patron saint of the college is Maximilian Kolbe, who was murdered in Auschwitz concentration camp on 14 August 1941. Established in 2008, the college's enrolments are expected to reach approximately 1,000 students for Years 7 to 12.

== Activities ==
The college runs many annual events such as swimming and athletics carnivals, cross country competitions, an annual presentation night, College feast day, a performing arts evening, and house feast day (different day for each house).

The College is a member of the Sports Association of Catholic Co-educational Secondary Schools (SACCSS). Every year level (7-10) in the college takes part in a sports competition called Premiere league, where the selected year level competes in more than six sport against other secondary schools around Melbourne that are members of the SACCSS association. Sports include:

- Football (Soccer) – Years 7, 8, 9, 10
- Basketball – Years 7, 8, 9, 10
- Volleyball – Years 7, 8, 9, 10
- Netball (Girls) – Years 7, 8, 9, 10
- AFL (Boys) – Years 7 & 9
- Cricket (Boys) – Years 8 & 10

== See also ==
- Kolbe Catholic College, Rockingham
- List of non-government schools in Victoria
- Catholic education in Australia
