= 2026–27 WNBL season =

- League: Women's National Basketball League
- Sport: Basketball
- Duration: 15 October 2026 – March 2027
- Teams: 9
- TV partner(s): 9Now; ESPN; Disney+

Regular season

Finals

WNBL seasons
- ← 2025–26 2027–28 →

The 2026–27 WNBL season is the 47th season of the competition since its establishment in 1981. The Townsville Fire are the defending champions.

This was the second season under new league ownership, following Basketball Australia's sold the league in April 2025. The league again expanded to a 9-team league with the addition of the Tasmania Jewels, as announced in December 2025. Their debut marks the WNBL's first expansion since 2015–16 and the league's return to Tasmania for the first time since 1996.

In July 2026, the season schedule was confirmed to feature 109 games, with each team playing 22 games across 16 rounds. The Finals will now feature the top five teams, with an additional Eliminiation final, alongside the existing Semi-Finals & Championship series. In September 2025, the WNBL signed a two-year broadcast deal which sees all regular season & Finals games live and free on 9Now for the fifth consecutive season, plus most games broadcast via ESPN on Disney+.

== Ladder ==
#	2026–27 WNBL Championship ladder				
#	Team	W	L	%	GP
1	Sydney Flames	4	0	119.4	4
2	Perth Lynx	2	0	106.6	2
3	Townsville Fire	2	2	108.0	4
4	Tasmania Jewels	1	1	99.4	2
5	Geelong Venom	1	1	95.3	2
6	Canberra Capitals	1	1	94.2	2
7	Southside Melbourne Flyers	1	2	102.1	3
8	Bendigo Spirit	0	2	86.4	2
9	Adelaide Lightning	0	3	80.4	3

== Statistics ==
=== Individual game highs ===
Category	Player	Statistic
Points	Abbey Ellis (TSV)	47
Rebounds	Anneli Maley (PER)	14
Assists	Jade Melbourne (BEN)	10
Steals	Abbey Ellis (TSV)	6
Blocks	Multiple players	3

== Finals ==
Elimination Final
4
5

Semi-Finals
1
2
3

Championship Series

== Team captains and coaches ==
Team	Captain	Coach
Adelaide Lightning	Stephanie Talbot	Aja Parham-Ammar
Bendigo Spirit	Kelsey Griffin / Marianna Tolo (co)	Kennedy Kereama
Canberra Capitals	Isabella Brancatisano / Nicole Munger (co)	Paul Goriss
Geelong Venom	Alexandra Sharp	Cheryl Chambers
Perth Lynx	TBC	Ryan Petrik
Southside Melbourne Flyers	TBC	Sam Mackinnon
Sydney Flames	TBC	Renae Garlepp
Tasmania Jewels	Darcee Garbin	Claudia Brassard
Townsville Fire	Courtney Woods	Shannon Seebohm
