= 2012–13 NBL squads =

The 2012–13 NBL season was the thirty-fifth season of the NBL. There were eight teams in the competition. The regular season was played between 5 October 2012 and 24 March 2013, followed by a post-season involving the top four in April 2013. The New Zealand Breakers were the defending champions, for the second straight year.

== 2012–13 NBL transactions ==
Player	Date signed	New team	Former team	Ref
Jacob Holmes	18 January	Townsville Crocodiles		
Daryl Corletto	12 March	New Zealand Breakers		
C. J. Bruton	14 March	New Zealand Breakers		
Mat Campbell	15 March	Retired	Wollongong Hawks	
Stephen Hoare	21 March	Retired	Gold Coast Blaze	
Aaron Grabau	27 March	Cairns Taipans		
Jamar Wilson	3 April	Cairns Taipans		
Wade Helliwell	12 April	Retired	Adelaide 36ers	
Russell Hinder	30 April	Townsville Crocodiles		
Todd Blanchfield	3 May	Townsville Crocodiles		
Cameron Gliddon	3 May	Cairns Taipans	Concordia University at Irvine	
Ben Allen	4 May	Townsville Crocodiles		
Thomas Abercrombie	8 May	New Zealand Breakers		
Dillon Boucher	8 May	New Zealand Breakers		
Tim Coenraad	8 May	Wollongong Hawks		
Peter Crawford	8 May	Townsville Crocodiles		
Larry Davidson	8 May	Wollongong Hawks		
Rhys Martin	8 May	Wollongong Hawks		
Cameron Tragardh	8 May	Cairns Taipans	Melbourne Tigers	
Mika Vukona	8 May	New Zealand Breakers		
Clint Steindl	9 May	Cairns Taipans	Saint Mary's College of California	
Chris Cedar	10 May	Townsville Crocodiles		
Michael Cedar	10 May	Townsville Crocodiles		
Mitch Creek	10 May	Adelaide 36ers		
Aaron Bruce	15 May	Sydney Kings		
Jason Cadee	15 May	Adelaide 36ers	Gold Coast Blaze	
Ian Crosswhite	15 May	Sydney Kings	Cairns Taipans	
Tom Garlepp	15 May	Sydney Kings	Gold Coast Blaze	
James Harvey	15 May	Sydney Kings	Gold Coast Blaze	
Luke Schenscher	16 May	Adelaide 36ers	Townsville Crocodiles	
Greg Hire	18 May	Perth Wildcats		
Jeremiah Trueman	18 May	Perth Wildcats		
Everard Bartlett	19 May	Perth Wildcats	Adelaide 36ers	
Leon Henry	19 May	New Zealand Breakers		
Adam Ballinger	21 May	Melbourne Tigers	Adelaide 36ers	
Corin Henry	25 May	Sydney Kings	Tarleton State University	
Alex Loughton	25 May	Cairns Taipans		
Brad Hill	31 May	Cairns Taipans		
Matt Burston	8 June	Melbourne Tigers		
Nate Tomlinson	8 June	Melbourne Tigers	University of Colorado at Boulder	
Tyson Demos	13 June	Wollongong Hawks		
Bennie Lewis	28 June	Melbourne Tigers		
Will Hudson	7 July	New Zealand Breakers	Gold Coast Blaze	
Darnell Lazare	9 July	Sydney Kings	Fort Wayne Mad Ants	
Anthony Petrie	24 July	Adelaide 36ers	Gold Coast Blaze	
Adam Gibson	26 July	Adelaide 36ers	Gold Coast Blaze	
Chris Goulding	3 August	Melbourne Tigers	Gold Coast Blaze	
Cedric Jackson	3 August	New Zealand Breakers		
Seth Scott	3 August	Melbourne Tigers	Pioneros de Los Mochis	
David Gruber	8 August	Wollongong Hawks		
Daniel Jackson	8 August	Wollongong Hawks		
Glen Saville	8 August	Wollongong Hawks		
Kevin Braswell	16 August	Melbourne Tigers	Southland Sharks	
Matthew Andronicos (DP)	20 August	Cairns Taipans	Canberra Gunners	
Shaun Bruce (DP)	20 August	Cairns Taipans	Ballarat Miners	
Lance Hurdle	22 August	Wollongong Hawks	Springfield Armor	
Kerry Williams	22 August	Cairns Taipans		
Auryn MacMillan	23 August	Wollongong Hawks	Kilsyth Cobras	
Adris Deleon	27 August	Wollongong Hawks	Metros de Santiago	
Shane Edwards	27 August	Cairns Taipans	Canton Charge	
Josh Bloxham (DP)	31 August	New Zealand Breakers		
Morgan Natanahira (DP)	31 August	New Zealand Breakers	Hawke's Bay Hawks	
Reuben Te Rangi (DP)	31 August	New Zealand Breakers	Harbour Heat	
Corey Webster	31 August	New Zealand Breakers		
Tai Webster (DP)	31 August	New Zealand Breakers	Auckland Pirates	
C. J. Massingale	9 September	Adelaide 36ers	Knox Raiders	
Pero Vasiljevic	18 September	Adelaide 36ers	North Adelaide Rockets	
Kevin White	19 September	Sydney Kings	Ballarat Miners	
Gary Ervin	1 October	Townsville Crocodiles	BC Kyiv	
Larry Abney	2 October	Townsville Crocodiles	Southland Sharks	
Daniel Joyce	24 October	Sydney Kings	Ballarat Miners	
Jonny Flynn	5 November	Melbourne Tigers	Portland Trail Blazers	
Luke Nevill	21 November	Townsville Crocodiles	Perth Wildcats	
Scott Christopherson	24 December	Adelaide 36ers	BC Tsmoki-Minsk	
Rhys Carter	21 January	Perth Wildcats	Uppsala Basket	
Malcolm Grant	21 January	Wollongong Hawks	APOEL B.C.	
Mirko Djeric	8 February	Wollongong Hawks	Bankstown Bruins	

== 2012–13 squads ==
=== Adelaide 36ers ===
Adelaide 36ers roster
Players
Coaches

Pos.	No.	Nat.	Name	Ht.	Wt.
G	1	(Australia)	Gibson, Adam (C)	1.88 m (6 ft 2 in)	93 kg (205 lb)
SF	3	(Australia)	Weigh, Stephen	1.98 m (6 ft 6 in)	105 kg (231 lb)
PG	4	(Australia)	Cadee, Jason	1.86 m (6 ft 1 in)	73 kg (161 lb)
PG	6	(Australia)	Daly, Tom	1.86 m (6 ft 1 in)	78 kg (172 lb)
PG	7	(Australia)	Doyle, Adam (DP)	1.76 m (5 ft 9 in)
C	10	(Australia)	Schenscher, Luke	2.16 m (7 ft 1 in)	120 kg (265 lb)
SG	11	(United States)	Christopherson, Scott (I)	1.90 m (6 ft 3 in)	88 kg (194 lb)
PF	13	(Australia)	Warbout, Jan (DP)	2.01 m (6 ft 7 in)
F/C	17	(Australia)	Petrie, Anthony	2.03 m (6 ft 8 in)	100 kg (220 lb)
F/C	18	(Australia)	Vasiljevic, Pero	2.09 m (6 ft 10 in)	115 kg (254 lb)
F/C	21	(Australia)	Johnson, Daniel	2.12 m (6 ft 11 in)	108 kg (238 lb)
G/F	23	(Australia)	Creek, Mitch (injured)	1.95 m (6 ft 5 in)	98 kg (216 lb)
G	24	(Australia)	Crosswell, Nathan (C)	1.90 m (6 ft 3 in)	89 kg (196 lb)
PG		(Australia)	Thomas, Patrick (DP)	1.89 m (6 ft 2 in)

Head coach

- (Australia) Marty Clarke

Assistant coach(es)

- (Australia) Mark Radford
- (Australia) Tony Casella
- (Australia) Tim Reeve (Strength & Conditioning)

Legend

- (C) Team captain
- (DP) Development player
- (I) Import player
- (TP) Training player
- Injured

- Roster
Updated: 30 January 2013

=== Cairns Taipans ===
Cairns Taipans roster
Players
Coaches

Pos.	No.	Nat.	Name	Ht.	Wt.
PF	0	(United States)	Edwards, Shane (I)	2.01 m (6 ft 7 in)	100 kg (220 lb)
PG	1	(Australia)	Williams, Kerry	1.81 m (5 ft 11 in)	84 kg (185 lb)
SG	3	(Australia)	Gliddon, Cameron	1.95 m (6 ft 5 in)	86 kg (190 lb)
PG	4	(Australia)	Adekponya, Matthew (DP)	1.86 m (6 ft 1 in)
PG	5	(United States)	Wilson, Jamar (I & C)	1.85 m (6 ft 1 in)	80 kg (176 lb)
G/F	6	(Australia)	Mitchell, James (DP)	1.95 m (6 ft 5 in)	90 kg (198 lb)
G	7	(Australia)	Bruce, Shaun (DP)	1.92 m (6 ft 4 in)
G/F	8	(Australia)	Grabau, Aaron	1.96 m (6 ft 5 in)	98 kg (216 lb)
G/F	9	(Australia)	Hill, Brad	1.98 m (6 ft 6 in)	90 kg (198 lb)
SF	10	(Australia)	Steindl, Clint	2.01 m (6 ft 7 in)	88 kg (194 lb)
F/C	11	(Australia)	Tragardh, Cameron	2.09 m (6 ft 10 in)	106 kg (234 lb)
PG	25	(Australia)	Soleimani, Justin (DP)	1.84 m (6 ft 0 in)
F/C	32	(Australia)	Andronicos, Matthew (DP)	2.08 m (6 ft 10 in)
F/C	40	(Australia)	Loughton, Alex (C)	2.05 m (6 ft 9 in)	110 kg (243 lb)
PF	45	(Australia)	Rychart, Dusty	2.01 m (6 ft 7 in)	100 kg (220 lb)

Head coach

- (Australia) Aaron Fearne

Assistant coach(es)

- (Australia) Mick Downer
- (Australia) Jamie Pearlman
- (Australia) Grant Spencer

Legend

- (C) Team captain
- (DP) Development player
- (I) Import player
- (TP) Training player
- Injured

- Roster
Updated: 30 January 2013

=== Melbourne Tigers ===
Melbourne Tigers roster
Players
Coaches

Pos.	No.	Nat.	Name	Ht.	Wt.
PG	1	(Australia)	Tomlinson, Nate	1.90 m (6 ft 3 in)	85 kg (187 lb)
PG	3	(United States)	Flynn, Jonny (I)	1.83 m (6 ft 0 in)	88 kg (194 lb)
F	5	(Australia)	Greer, Tommy (C)	2.00 m (6 ft 7 in)	95 kg (209 lb)
G	7	(Australia)	MacDonald, Alister (DP)	1.86 m (6 ft 1 in)
G/F	9	(Australia)	Lewis, Bennie	2.03 m (6 ft 8 in)	84 kg (185 lb)
F	13	(Australia)	Rush, Liam	2.02 m (6 ft 8 in)	94 kg (207 lb)
G/F	15	(Australia)	Odigie, Owen (DP)	1.96 m (6 ft 5 in)
F/C	20	(United States)	Scott, Seth (I)	2.08 m (6 ft 10 in)	109 kg (240 lb)
C	22	(Australia)	Burston, Matt (C)	2.11 m (6 ft 11 in)	103 kg (227 lb)
PF	24	(Australia)	Walker, Lucas	2.03 m (6 ft 8 in)	102 kg (225 lb)
SG	43	(Australia)	Goulding, Chris	1.92 m (6 ft 4 in)	92 kg (203 lb)
F/C	54	(Australia)	Ballinger, Adam	2.05 m (6 ft 9 in)	110 kg (243 lb)
C	56	(Australia)	Winter, Lachlan (DP)	2.10 m (6 ft 11 in)

Head coach

- (Australia) Chris Anstey

Assistant coach(es)

- (Australia) Darryl McDonald
- (Australia) Rohan Short

Legend

- (C) Team captain
- (DP) Development player
- (I) Import player
- (TP) Training player
- Injured

- Roster
Updated: 30 January 2013

=== New Zealand Breakers ===
New Zealand Breakers roster
Players
Coaches

Pos.	No.	Nat.	Name	Ht.	Wt.
SG	3	(Australia)	Corletto, Daryl	1.93 m (6 ft 4 in)	88 kg (194 lb)
PG	4	(United States)	Jackson, Cedric (I)	1.91 m (6 ft 3 in)	86 kg (190 lb)
F/C	5	(United States)	Hudson, Will (I)	2.06 m (6 ft 9 in)	106 kg (234 lb)
SF	7	(New Zealand)	Te Rangi, Reuben (DP)	1.97 m (6 ft 6 in)
PG	8	(New Zealand)	Webster, Tai (DP)	1.86 m (6 ft 1 in)
G	9	(New Zealand)	Webster, Corey	1.88 m (6 ft 2 in)	86 kg (190 lb)
G/F	10	(New Zealand)	Abercrombie, Thomas	1.98 m (6 ft 6 in)	94 kg (207 lb)
PF	14	(New Zealand)	Vukona, Mika (C)	1.98 m (6 ft 6 in)	93 kg (205 lb)
G/F	15	(New Zealand)	Natanahira, Morgan (DP)	1.98 m (6 ft 6 in)
PG	21	(New Zealand)	Bloxham, Josh (DP)	1.86 m (6 ft 1 in)	85 kg (187 lb)
G	23	(Australia)	Bruton, C. J.	1.88 m (6 ft 2 in)	88 kg (194 lb)
F	24	(New Zealand)	Boucher, Dillon	1.96 m (6 ft 5 in)	96 kg (212 lb)
G/F	33	(New Zealand)	Henry, Leon	2.02 m (6 ft 8 in)	105 kg (231 lb)
C	35	(New Zealand)	Pledger, Alex	2.13 m (7 ft 0 in)	113 kg (249 lb)

Head coach

- (Australia) Andrej Lemanis

Assistant coach(es)

- (Australia) Dean Vickerman
- (New Zealand) Judd Flavell
- (New Zealand) Steve Buckley (Fitness)

Legend

- (C) Team captain
- (DP) Development player
- (I) Import player
- Injured

- Roster
Updated: 30 January 2013

=== Perth Wildcats ===
Perth Wildcats roster
Players
Coaches

Pos.	No.	Nat.	Name	Ht.	Wt.
F/C	0	(Australia)	Vigor, Michael (DP)	2.05 m (6 ft 9 in)	101 kg (223 lb)
PG	1	(Australia)	Carter, Rhys	1.90 m (6 ft 3 in)	85 kg (187 lb)
PG	2	(Australia)	Armour, Kyle (DP)	1.83 m (6 ft 0 in)	81 kg (179 lb)
PG	3	(Australia)	Iliadis, Trian (DP)	1.90 m (6 ft 3 in)	84 kg (185 lb)
F	4	(Australia)	Hire, Greg	2.01 m (6 ft 7 in)	101 kg (223 lb)
G	5	(New Zealand)	Bartlett, Everard	1.93 m (6 ft 4 in)	85 kg (187 lb)
F/C	9	(Australia)	Knight, Matthew	2.03 m (6 ft 8 in)	107 kg (236 lb)
G/F	10	(Australia)	Purser, Ben (DP)	2.01 m (6 ft 7 in)	94 kg (207 lb)
G/F	11	(Australia)	Tovey, Cameron	2.02 m (6 ft 8 in)	92 kg (203 lb)
G	12	(United States)	Lisch, Kevin (I)	1.88 m (6 ft 2 in)	89 kg (196 lb)
PG	22	(Australia)	Robbins, Brad	1.86 m (6 ft 1 in)	102 kg (225 lb)
SG	23	(Australia)	Cassir, Robert (DP)	1.96 m (6 ft 5 in)
PF	24	(Australia)	Wagstaff, Jesse	2.03 m (6 ft 8 in)	103 kg (227 lb)
F/C	25	(New Zealand)	Trueman, Jeremiah	2.04 m (6 ft 8 in)	100 kg (220 lb)
G/F	31	(Australia)	Field, Gavin (DP)	2.00 m (6 ft 7 in)	80 kg (176 lb)
PF	42	(Australia)	Redhage, Shawn (C)	2.03 m (6 ft 8 in)	102 kg (225 lb)
PG	53	(Australia)	Martin, Damian (injured) (C)	1.86 m (6 ft 1 in)	92 kg (203 lb)

Head coach

- (Australia) Rob Beveridge

Assistant coach(es)

- (Australia) Shawn Dennis
- (Australia) Andy Stewart
- (United States) Adam Tatalovich

Legend

- (C) Team captain
- (DP) Development player
- (I) Import player
- (TP) Training player
- Injured

- Roster
Updated: 30 January 2013

=== Sydney Kings ===
Sydney Kings roster
Players
Coaches

Pos.	No.	Nat.	Name	Ht.	Wt.
G/F	1	(Australia)	Madgen, Ben (C)	1.93 m (6 ft 4 in)	83 kg (183 lb)
F	3	(Australia)	Jenkins, Callum (DP)
PG	4	(Australia)	Martin, Luke	1.82 m (6 ft 0 in)	77 kg (170 lb)
F	7	(Australia)	Dann, Graeme	2.02 m (6 ft 8 in)	98 kg (216 lb)
SG	9	(Australia)	Joyce, Daniel	1.94 m (6 ft 4 in)
C	10	(Australia)	Crosswhite, Ian	2.10 m (6 ft 11 in)	115 kg (254 lb)
G	11	(Australia)	Bruce, Aaron	1.90 m (6 ft 3 in)	86 kg (190 lb)
PG	12	(United States)	Henry, Corin (injured) (I)	1.80 m (5 ft 11 in)	77 kg (170 lb)
F/C	14	(Australia)	Garlepp, Tom	2.03 m (6 ft 8 in)	98 kg (216 lb)
G	22	(Australia)	White, Kevin	1.89 m (6 ft 2 in)	85 kg (187 lb)
PG	24	(Australia)	Weeks, Jarrad (DP)	1.87 m (6 ft 2 in)	80 kg (176 lb)
G/F	33	(Australia)	Harvey, James (C)	1.96 m (6 ft 5 in)	91 kg (201 lb)
PF	35	(United States)	Lazare, Darnell (I)	2.03 m (6 ft 8 in)	109 kg (240 lb)

Head coach

- (Australia) Shane Heal

Assistant coach(es)

- (Australia) Tim Hudson
- (Australia) Shannon Seebohm
- (Australia) Ben Knight

Strength & conditioning coach(es)

- (Australia) Philip Alleaume

Team manager

- (Australia) Laurie Watterson

Legend

- (C) Team captain
- (DP) Development player
- (I) Import player
- (TP) Training player
- Injured

- Roster
Updated: 30 January 2013

=== Townsville Crocodiles ===
Townsville Crocodiles roster
Players
Coaches

Pos.	No.	Nat.	Name	Ht.	Wt.
PG	3	(Australia)	Cedar, Chris	1.85 m (6 ft 1 in)	80 kg (176 lb)
C	5	(Australia)	Allen, Ben	2.11 m (6 ft 11 in)	113 kg (249 lb)
PG	6	(Australia)	Norton, Mitch	1.80 m (5 ft 11 in)	85 kg (187 lb)
PG	9	(United States)	Ervin, Gary (I)	1.83 m (6 ft 0 in)	81 kg (179 lb)
F/C	10	(Australia)	Hinder, Russell (C)	2.08 m (6 ft 10 in)	110 kg (243 lb)
F	12	(Australia)	Blanchfield, Todd	2.00 m (6 ft 7 in)	94 kg (207 lb)
G/F	17	(Australia)	Crawford, Peter	1.93 m (6 ft 4 in)	88 kg (194 lb)
G	20	(Australia)	Teys, Brendan (DP)	1.88 m (6 ft 2 in)	88 kg (194 lb)
G/F	24	(Australia)	Cedar, Michael	1.90 m (6 ft 3 in)	82 kg (181 lb)
PF	31	(Australia)	Holmes, Jacob	2.01 m (6 ft 7 in)	94 kg (207 lb)
C	50	(Australia)	Nevill, Luke	2.18 m (7 ft 2 in)
G/F		(Australia)	Demertze, Michael (DP)	1.96 m (6 ft 5 in)
PG		(Australia)	Myles, Josh (DP)	1.78 m (5 ft 10 in)

Head coach

- (United States) Paul Woolpert

Assistant coach(es)

- (Australia) Liam Flynn (Senior Assistant)
- (Australia) Rodney Anderson (Scouting & Technical)
- (Australia) Matt Johnston (Development)
- (Australia) Cameron Whiting (High Performance)

Legend

- (C) Team captain
- (DP) Development player
- (I) Import player
- (TP) Training player
- Injured

- Roster
Updated: 30 January 2013

=== Wollongong Hawks ===
Wollongong Hawks roster
Players
Coaches

Pos.	No.	Nat.	Name	Ht.	Wt.
G	1	(United States)	Hurdle, Lance (injured) (I)	1.88 m (6 ft 2 in)	89 kg (196 lb)
G	2	(Australia)	Demos, Tyson	1.91 m (6 ft 3 in)	80 kg (176 lb)
PG	3	(Dominican Republic)	Deleon, Adris (I)	1.80 m (5 ft 11 in)	75 kg (165 lb)
G	6	(Australia)	Djeric, Mirko	1.91 m (6 ft 3 in)
PF	7	(Australia)	Forman, Oscar (C)	2.05 m (6 ft 9 in)	98 kg (216 lb)
F	9	(Australia)	Jackson, Daniel	2.00 m (6 ft 7 in)
F/C	10	(Australia)	Davidson, Larry	2.06 m (6 ft 9 in)	100 kg (220 lb)
G/F	12	(Australia)	Saville, Glen (injured)	1.97 m (6 ft 6 in)	97 kg (214 lb)
PG	13	(Australia)	Martin, Rhys (injured)	1.84 m (6 ft 0 in)	79 kg (174 lb)
PG	15	(United States)	Grant, Malcolm (I)	1.85 m (6 ft 1 in)	85 kg (187 lb)
G/F	22	(Australia)	Coenraad, Tim	2.01 m (6 ft 7 in)	100 kg (220 lb)
SG	23	(Australia)	Beagley, Alex (DP)
F/C	42	(Australia)	Gruber, David	1.98 m (6 ft 6 in)	110 kg (243 lb)
PG	55	(Australia)	Delaney, Zac (DP)	1.65 m (5 ft 5 in)	76 kg (168 lb)
F/C	79	(Australia)	MacMillan, Auryn	2.03 m (6 ft 8 in)	107 kg (236 lb)

Head coach

- (Australia) Gordie McLeod

Assistant coach(es)

- (United States) Eric Cooks
- (Australia) Matt Flinn
- (Australia) David Boyle (Strength & Conditioning)

Legend

- (C) Team captain
- (DP) Development player
- (I) Import player
- (TP) Training player
- Injured

- Roster
Updated: 30 January 2013

== 2012–13 All-Star teams ==
North

Pos.	Starter	Bench	Bench	Reserve
C	Cameron Tragardh	Clint Steindl
PF	Darnell Lazare	Peter Crawford
SF	Oscar Forman	Lance Hurdle
SG	Ben Madgen	Jamar Wilson
PG	Adris Deleon	Gary Ervin

South

Pos.	Starter	Bench	Bench	Reserve
C	Daniel Johnson	Shawn Redhage
PF	Seth Scott	Stephen Weigh
SF	Thomas Abercrombie	Chris Goulding
SG	Cedric Jackson	Adam Gibson
PG	Jonny Flynn	Jason Cadee
