= 2012–13 New Zealand Breakers season =

- Head coach: Andrej Lemanis
- Captain: Mika Vukona
- Arena: Vector Arena; North Shore Events Centre

NBL results
- Record: 24–4 (85.7%)
- Ladder: 1st
- Finals finish: Champions (Defeated Wildcats 2–0)
- Stats at NBL.com.au

The 2012–13 NBL season was the 10th season of the New Zealand Breakers in the NBL. The Breakers succeeded in winning their third NBL championship, becoming the second team in the league to win a three-peat.

In the preseason, the Breakers record was 3–3. The Breakers lost their preseason series with the Wollongong Hawks 1–2.

On 24 April 2013, following the conclusion of the 2012–13 season, Lemanis was announced as the new head coach of the Australian men's national basketball team.

== Off-Season ==
=== Additions ===
Player	Signed	Former Team
Will Hudson	Signed 14 July	Gold Coast Blaze

The Breakers also signed Reuben Te Rangi and Morgan Natanahira as contracted development players and Tai Webster as a non-contracted development player.

=== Subtractions ===
Player	Reason Left	New Team
B. J. Anthony	Released	OceanaGold Nuggets
Gary Wilkinson	Released	BC Kalev/Cramo

=== Re-signed players ===
The Breakers re-signed Cedric Jackson, Leon Henry, Tom Abercrombie, Dillon Boucher, Mika Vukona, C. J. Bruton, Alex Pledger, Daryl Corletto and Josh Bloxham (DP).

Corey Webster also returns to the team, after a 12-month suspension.

== Roster ==
New Zealand Breakers roster
Players
Coaches

Pos.	No.	Nat.	Name	Ht.	Wt.
SG	3	(Australia)	Corletto, Daryl	1.93 m (6 ft 4 in)	88 kg (194 lb)
PG	4	(United States)	Jackson, Cedric (I)	1.91 m (6 ft 3 in)	91 kg (201 lb)
F/C	5	(United States)	Hudson, Will (I)	2.06 m (6 ft 9 in)	106 kg (234 lb)
SF	7	(New Zealand)	Te Rangi, Reuben (DP)	1.97 m (6 ft 6 in)	85 kg (187 lb)
PG	8	(New Zealand)	Webster, Tai (DP)	1.86 m (6 ft 1 in)
G	9	(New Zealand)	Webster, Corey	1.88 m (6 ft 2 in)	86 kg (190 lb)
G/F	10	(New Zealand)	Abercrombie, Thomas	1.98 m (6 ft 6 in)	87 kg (192 lb)
PF	14	(New Zealand)	Vukona, Mika (C)	1.98 m (6 ft 6 in)	93 kg (205 lb)
F	15	(New Zealand)	Natanahira, Morgan (DP)	1.98 m (6 ft 6 in)	103 kg (227 lb)
PG	21	(New Zealand)	Bloxham, Josh (DP)	1.86 m (6 ft 1 in)	85 kg (187 lb)
G	23	(Australia)	Bruton, C. J.	1.88 m (6 ft 2 in)	88 kg (194 lb)
F	24	(New Zealand)	Boucher, Dillon	1.96 m (6 ft 5 in)	98 kg (216 lb)
G/F	33	(New Zealand)	Henry, Leon	2.02 m (6 ft 8 in)	105 kg (231 lb)
C	35	(New Zealand)	Pledger, Alex	2.13 m (7 ft 0 in)	113 kg (249 lb)

Head coach

- (Australia) Andrej Lemanis

Assistant coach(es)

- (Australia) Dean Vickerman
- (New Zealand) Judd Flavell
- (New Zealand) Steve Buckley (Fitness)

Legend

- (C) Team captain
- (DP) Development player
- (I) Import player
- (TP) Training player
- Injured

- Roster
Updated: 26 July 2013

=== Depth chart ===
Pos.	Starting 5	Bench 1	Bench 2
C	Alex Pledger	Will Hudson
PF	Mika Vukona	Dillon Boucher	Reuben Te Rangi
SF	Thomas Abercrombie	Leon Henry	Morgan Natanahira
SG	Daryl Corletto	Corey Webster	Tai Webster
PG	Cedric Jackson	C. J. Bruton	Josh Bloxham

== Pre-season ==
The Breakers finished the Preseason with a 3–3 record.

Date	Opposition	Venue	Result	Box Score
11 September 2012	Wollongong Hawks	CBS Arena, Christchurch, Canterbury, New Zealand	W 70 – 61	
13 September 2012	Wollongong Hawks	Edgar Centre, Dunedin, Otagon, New Zealand	L 61 – 64	
15 September 2012	Wollongong Hawks	Claudelands Arena, Hamilton, Waikato, New Zealand	L 87 – 90	None
20 September 2012	Townsville Crocodiles	St Pauls Court, Federation Square, Melbourne, Australia	W 71 – 66	
21 September 2012	Cairns Taipans	St Pauls Court, Federation Square, Melbourne, Australia	W 83 – 75	
22 September 2012	Sydney Kings	St Pauls Court, Federation Square, Melbourne, Australia	L 93 – 100	

== Regular season ==
Round	Date	Opposition	Venue	Result	Box Score
1	5 October 2012	Perth Wildcats	NSEC, Auckland, New Zealand	L 72 – 93	
2	12 October 2012	Adelaide 36ers	Vector Arena, Auckland, New Zealand	W 73 – 59	
3	19 October 2012	Townsville Crocodiles	NSEC, Auckland, New Zealand	W 73 – 71	
4	26 October 2012	Melbourne Tigers	Hisense Arena, Melbourne, Australia	W 64 – 75	
5	2 November 2012	Sydney Kings	NSEC, Auckland, New Zealand	W 79 – 76	
6	9 November 2012	Townsville Crocodiles	Townsville Entertainment Centre, Townsville, Queensland, Australia	W 81 – 72	
	10 November 2012	Cairns Taipans	Cairns Convention Centre, Cairns, Queensland, Australia	W 73 – 54	
7	16 November 2012	Townsville Crocodiles	Vector Arena, Auckland, New Zealand	W 93 – 63	
8	22 November 2012	Perth Wildcats	Perth Arena, Perth, Western Australia	L 64 – 89	
9	30 November 2012	Melbourne Tigers	NSEC, Auckland, New Zealand	W 94 – 64	
10	8 December 2012	Sydney Kings	Sydney Olympic Park Sports Centre, Sydney, Australia	L 62 – 75	
11	13 December 2012	Cairns Taipans	Vector Arena, Auckland, New Zealand	W 97 – 76	
12	28 December 2012	Adelaide 36ers	Adelaide Arena, Adelaide, South Australia, Australia	W 71 – 66	
	31 December 2012	Cairns Taipans	Cairns Convention Centre, Cairns, Queensland, Australia	W 66 – 61	
13	5 January 2013	Wollongong Hawks	WIN Entertainment Centre, Wollongong, New South Wales, Australia	W 78 – 76	
14	11 January 2013	Townsville Crocodiles	Townsville Entertainment Centre, Townsville, New South Wales, AUS	W 82 – 78	
15	17 January 2013	Wollongong Hawks	NSEC, Auckland, New Zealand	W 72 – 71	
	20 January 2013	Adelaide 36ers	Adelaide Arena, Adelaide, South Australia, Australia	W 84 – 66	
16	24 January 2013	Sydney Kings	NSEC, Auckland, New Zealand	W 95 – 76	
	26 January 2013	Wollongong Hawks	WIN Entertainment Centre, Wollongong, New South Wales, Australia	W 91 – 74	
17	1 February 2013	Perth Wildcats	Vector Arena, Auckland, New Zealand	W 98 – 81	
18	9 February 2013	Sydney Kings	Sydney Entertainment Centre, Sydney, Australia	W 96 – 94	
19	15 February 2013	Wollongong Hawks	NSEC, Auckland, New Zealand	W 92 – 84	
20	BYE				
21	28 February 2013	Adelaide 36ers	Vector Arena, Auckland, New Zealand	W 104 – 79	
22	7 March 2013	Cairns Taipans	NSEC, Auckland, New Zealand	W 80 – 77	
23	14 March 2013	Melbourne Tigers	Vector Arena, Auckland, New Zealand	W 79 – 74	
24	22 March 2013	Perth Wildcats	Perth Arena, Perth, Western Australia	L 58 – 73	

== Finals ==
With the Breakers making the playoffs in 2012/13, it was their fifth appearance in the NBL Finals. If they progress to the Grand Final, it would be their third appearance.

Semi-final 1: vs Kings – 28 March 2013 @ Vector Arena, Auckland
Semi-final 2: @ Kings – 1 April 2013 @ Sydney Entertainment Centre, Sydney
Grand Final 1: vs Wildcats – 7 April 2013 @ Vector Arena, Auckland
Grand Final 2: @ Wildcats – 12 April 2013 @ Perth Arena, Perth

Semifinals
1	New Zealand Breakers	81	99	X
4	Sydney Kings	64	88	X
2	Perth Wildcats	93	85	X
3	Wollongong Hawks	65	81	X

Grand Final
1	New Zealand Breakers	79	70	X
2	Perth Wildcats	67	66	X

== NBL All-Star round ==
The NBL All-Star Round was played on 22 December at the Adelaide Arena. Two of the New Zealand Breakers' roster and coach Andrej Lemanis took part in the event.

=== All-star line up ===
The New Zealand Breakers were placed in the "South" team for the All-Star game, along with the Adelaide 36ers, Melbourne Tigers and Perth Wildcats. Breakers who played for the South All-Stars were:

- PG: Cedric Jackson
- SF: Thomas Abercrombie

=== All-star coach ===
The Breakers' coach, Andrej Lemanis, coached the South All-Stars team. This was decided because the Breakers had the top NBL ladder spot of the South teams at the end of Round 9, when the decision was made.

=== Slam dunk competition ===
Thomas Abercrombie took part in the Slam Dunk Competition. This was decided by the League Office after the teams nominated players.
