= Corletto =

Corletto, Corleto is a surname. Notable people with the surname include:

- Daryl Corletto (born 1981), Australian-British basketball player
- Ignacio Corleto (born 1978), Argentine rugby union player
- Julie Corletto (born 1986), Australian netball player
