= Will Hudson (basketball) =

American basketball player

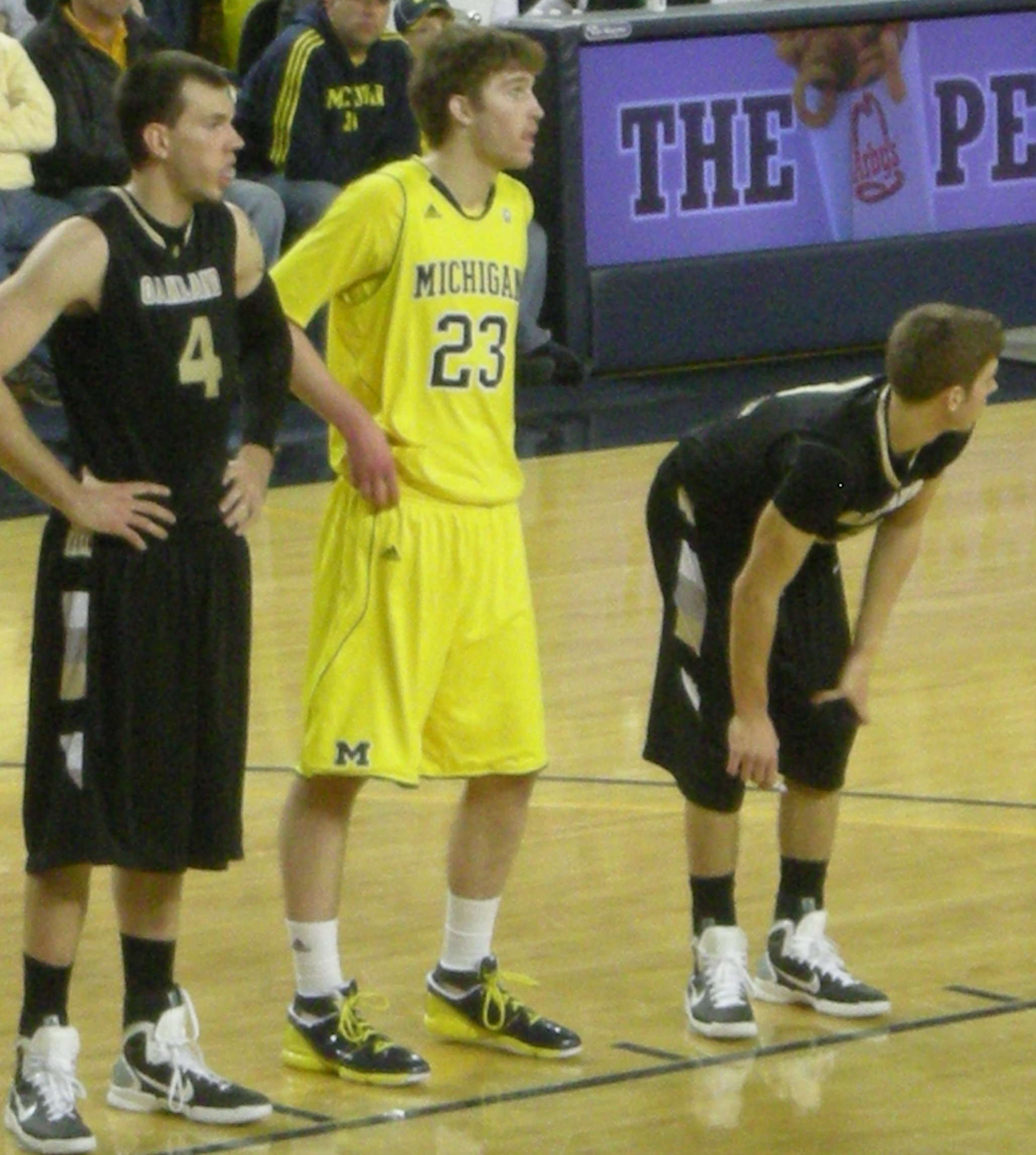
- Hudson (#4) with the Oakland Golden Grizzlies in 2010

Personal information
- Born: March 30, 1989 (age 35); Madison, Wisconsin, U.S.
- Listed height: 6 ft 9 in (2.06 m)
- Listed weight: 234 lb (106 kg)

Career information
- High school: Middleton (Middleton, Wisconsin)
- College: Oakland (2007–2011)
- NBA draft: 2011: undrafted
- Playing career: 2011–2014
- Position: Center / power forward

Career history
- 2011–2012: Gold Coast Blaze
- 2012–2013: New Zealand Breakers
- 2013–2014: ASVEL Basket
- 2014: Spirou Charleroi

Career highlights and awards
- NBL champion (2013); Second-team All-Summit League (2011)

William Robert Hudson (born March 30, 1989) is an American former professional basketball player. He played college basketball for Oakland University where he broke the school record with 137 games played and 345 offensive rebounds.

== High school career ==
Hudson attended Middleton High School in Middleton, Wisconsin where he was a three-time all-conference selection and a three-time letterwinner in basketball for head coach Kevin Bavery. As a junior in 2005–06, he averaged 14 points, eight rebounds and four blocks per game.

In November 2006, Hudson signed a National Letter of Intent to play college basketball for Oakland University.

As a senior in 2006–07, Hudson averaged 21 points, 13 rebounds and five blocks per game, leading Madison to a 19–5 record and the school's highest ever ranking at No. 5 while winning the league's scoring title and earning first-team all-state by state coaches and second-team by the Associated Press.

== College career ==
In his freshman season at Oakland, Hudson played 31 games (two starts) while averaging 3.5 points and 3.0 rebounds in 12.2 minutes per game. On November 11, 2007, he scored a season-high 12 points and three blocks versus Adrian College.

In his sophomore season, Hudson led the team with .682 field goal percentage while recording 25 blocks on the season. In 36 games (24 starts), he averaged 7.4 points and 4.6 rebounds in 22.1 minutes per game.

In his junior season, Hudson led the team for the second straight season with a .638 field goal percentage and finished fifth in The Summit League with 2.9 offensive rebounds per game. In 35 games (24 starts), he averaged 6.0 points and 4.9 rebounds in 21.6 minutes per game.

In his senior season, Hudson earned second-team All-Summit League honors. He set a single-season school record with 133 offensive rebounds while also ranking second in The Summit League in field goal percentage (.645) and led the league with 3.8 offensive rebounds per game. On January 29, 2011, he tied his career high 22 points against Oral Roberts. In 35 games (all starts), he averaged 12.6 points and 7.2 rebounds in 31.3 minutes per game. He became the 29th player to reach 1,000 points for his career, finishing 28th with 1,023.

=== College statistics ===
Year	Team	GP	GS	MPG	FG%	3P%	FT%	RPG	APG	SPG	BPG	PPG
2007–08	Oakland	31	2	12.2	.532	.000	.575	3.0	.2	.3	.4	3.5
2008–09	Oakland	36	24	22.1	.682	.000	.671	4.6	.8	.7	.7	7.4
2009–10	Oakland	35	24	21.6	.638	.000	.616	4.9	.5	.8	.5	6.0
2010–11	Oakland	35	35	31.3	.645	.000	.714	7.2	.8	.7	.9	12.6

== Professional career ==
Hudson went undrafted in the 2011 NBA draft. In August 2011, he signed with the Gold Coast Blaze for the 2011–12 NBL season.

In July 2012, Hudson signed with the New Zealand Breakers for the 2012–13 NBL season.

On December 30, 2013, Hudson signed with ASVEL Basket of France as a short-term injury replacement. On April 2, 2014, he was released by ASVEL after playing in 10 games.

On August 18, 2014, Hudson signed with Spirou Charleroi of Belgium for the 2014–15 season. He left Spirou on October 16 for personal reasons after appearing in four games.

== Personal ==
Hudson is the son David and Lynn Hudson, and has a brother named Andrew.
