= 2012–13 NBL season =

Professional basketball season

- League: National Basketball League
- Season: 2012–13
- Dates: 5 October 2012 – 12 April 2013
- Teams: 8
- TV partners: Australia: Network Ten; One HD; New Zealand: Sky Sport; Online: NBL TV; FIBA TV

Regular season
- Season champions: New Zealand Breakers
- Season MVP: (United States) Cedric Jackson (New Zealand)

Finals
- Champions: New Zealand Breakers (3rd title)
- Runners-up: Perth Wildcats
- Semi-finalists: Wollongong Hawks; Sydney Kings
- Finals MVP: (United States) Cedric Jackson (New Zealand)

Statistical leaders
Points	(Australia) Ben Madgen (Sydney)	17.9
Rebounds	(Australia) Daniel Johnson (Adelaide)	8.1
Assists	(United States) Cedric Jackson (New Zealand)	7.2

NBL seasons
- ← 2011–12 2013–14 →

The 2012–13 NBL season was the 35th season of competition since its establishment in 1979. A total of eight teams contested the league. The regular season was played between 5 October 2012 and 24 March 2013, followed by a post-season which involved the top four in April 2013. The schedule was announced on 4 June 2012. The New Zealand Breakers successfully defended their 2011–12 title for a third consecutive championship.

Broadcast rights were held by free-to-air network Channel Ten and its digital sports sister station One, in the third year of a five-year deal, through to the 2014–15 season. In New Zealand, Sky Sport were the official league broadcaster, with a three-year exclusive deal being signed.

Sponsorship included iiNet entering its third season as league naming rights sponsor and Spalding providing equipment including the official game ball.

The NBL All-Star Game was reintroduced to the fixture list after a four-year absence and was played on 22 December 2012 at the Adelaide Arena.

The league reverted to an eight-team competition when Gold Coast Blaze withdrew on 18 July 2012. A new schedule was released on 25 July 2012.

== Pre-season ==
=== Perth Wildcats pre-season ===
29 July 2012	Perth Wildcats	84–66	Cairns Taipans	South Hedland Recreation Centre, South Hedland
.

==== 2012 Cable Beach Invitational ====
26 September 2012	Perth Wildcats	62–54	Singapore Slingers	Cable Beach, Broome
.

27 September 2012	Perth Wildcats	73–47	Zhejiang Lions	Cable Beach, Broome
Fox Sports

28 September 2012	Perth Wildcats	71–37	Shanghai Sharks	Cable Beach, Broome
Fox Sports

=== Adelaide 36ers pre-season ===
4 August 2012	Adelaide 36ers	85–75	Nicholls State University	Adelaide Arena, Adelaide
.

==== 2012 Longgang International Men’s Basketball Challenge ====
7 September 2012	Adelaide 36ers	88–64	Elkhart Express	Dayun Center Gymnasium, Shenzhen, China
.

8 September 2012	Adelaide 36ers	96–56	OKK Belgrade	Dayun Center Gymnasium, Shenzhen, China
.

9 September 2012	Dongguan Leopards	59–65	Adelaide 36ers	Dayun Center Gymnasium, Shenzhen, China
.

11 September 2012	Adelaide 36ers	88–76	Elkhart Express	Zhongshan, China
.

Adelaide 36ers win 2012 Longgang International Men’s Basketball Challenge.

=== Melbourne Tigers pre-season ===
7 August 2012	Melbourne Tigers	74–75	Washington State University	Kilsyth Sports Centre, Melbourne
.

10 August 2012	Melbourne Tigers	90–60	Northern Colorado University	Caulfield Grammar, Melbourne
.

31 August 2012	Melbourne Tigers	54–67	Wollongong Hawks	Kilsyth Sports Centre, Melbourne
.

2 September 2012	Melbourne Tigers	66–90	Wollongong Hawks	Melbourne Sports and Aquatic Centre, Melbourne
.

=== Wollongong Hawks pre-season ===
10 August 2012	Wollongong Hawks	86–74	Washington State University	Illawarra Basketball Stadium, Wollongong
.

12 August 2012	Wollongong Hawks	87–63	Northern Colorado University	Illawarra Basketball Stadium, Wollongong
.

=== Cairns Taipans pre-season ===
14 August 2012	Cairns Taipans	86–81	Washington State University	Bendigo Bank Basketball Stadium, Cairns
.

13 September 2012	Cairns Taipans	91–80	Perth Wildcats	Bendigo Bank Basketball Stadium, Cairns
.

14 September 2012	Cairns Taipans	61–69	Perth Wildcats	Bendigo Bank Basketball Stadium, Cairns
.

=== Sydney Kings pre-season ===
24 August 2012	Sydney Kings	67–74	Wollongong Hawks	Gosford City Basketball & Sports Stadium, Terrigal
.

7 September 2012	Sydney Kings	98–93 (OT)	Cairns Taipans	Tamworth Sports Dome, Tamworth
.

8 September 2012	Sydney Kings	80–60	Cairns Taipans	Tamworth Sports Dome, Tamworth
.

=== New Zealand Breakers pre-season ===
11 September 2012	New Zealand Breakers	70–61	Wollongong Hawks	CBS Canterbury Arena, Christchurch
.				Attendance: 6,500

13 September 2012	New Zealand Breakers	61–64	Wollongong Hawks	Edgar Centre, Dunedin
.

15 September 2012	New Zealand Breakers	84–90	Wollongong Hawks	Claudelands Arena, Hamilton
.

=== Townsville Crocodiles pre-season ===
14 September 2012	Townsville Crocodiles	78–68	Sydney Kings	USQ Clive Berghofer Recreation Centre, Toowoomba
.

16 September 2012	Townsville Crocodiles	92–79	Sydney Kings	USQ Clive Berghofer Recreation Centre, Toowoomba
.

28 September 2012	Townsville Crocodiles	91–100	Melbourne Tigers	RSL Stadium, Townsville
.

=== 2012 NBL pre-season tournament ===
20 September 2012	Adelaide 36ers	104–105 (2OT)	Wollongong Hawks	Dandenong Basketball Stadium, Melbourne
.

20 September 2012	Perth Wildcats	97–70	Sydney Kings	Dandenong Basketball Stadium, Melbourne
.

20 September 2012	Melbourne Tigers	78–74	Cairns Taipans	Dandenong Basketball Stadium, Melbourne
.

20 September 2012	New Zealand Breakers	71–66	Townsville Crocodiles	Dandenong Basketball Stadium, Melbourne
.

21 September 2012	Adelaide 36ers	96–90	Sydney Kings	Dandenong Basketball Stadium, Melbourne
.

21 September 2012	Cairns Taipans	75–83	New Zealand Breakers	Dandenong Basketball Stadium, Melbourne
.

21 September 2012	Melbourne Tigers	67–70	Perth Wildcats	Dandenong Basketball Stadium, Melbourne
.

21 September 2012	Wollongong Hawks	75–53	Townsville Crocodiles	Dandenong Basketball Stadium, Melbourne
.

==== Finals ====
22 September 2012	New Zealand Breakers	93–100	Sydney Kings	Dandenong Basketball Stadium, Melbourne
.

22 September 2012	Melbourne Tigers	60–80	Townsville Crocodiles	Dandenong Basketball Stadium, Melbourne
.

22 September 2012	Adelaide 36ers	89–62	Cairns Taipans	Dandenong Basketball Stadium, Melbourne
.

22 September 2012	Perth Wildcats	72–60	Wollongong Hawks	Dandenong Basketball Stadium, Melbourne
.

Perth Wildcats are pre-season champions.

== Regular season ==
=== Round 1 ===
5 October 2012	New Zealand Breakers	72–93	Perth Wildcats	North Shore Events Centre, Auckland
Sky Sport				Attendance: 4,000

5 October 2012	Wollongong Hawks	79–76	Sydney Kings	WIN Entertainment Centre, Wollongong
One				Attendance: 4,323

6 October 2012	Cairns Taipans	84–72	Townsville Crocodiles	Cairns Convention Centre, Cairns
NBL TV				Attendance: 4,473

7 October 2012	Adelaide 36ers	84–61	Melbourne Tigers	Adelaide Arena, Adelaide
Network Ten				Attendance: 3,988

=== Round 2 ===
12 October 2012	New Zealand Breakers	73–59	Adelaide 36ers	Vector Arena, Auckland
Sky Sport				Attendance: 6,625

12 October 2012	Sydney Kings	85–82	Melbourne Tigers	Sydney Entertainment Centre, Sydney
One				Attendance: 4,386

12 October 2012	Cairns Taipans	58–68	Wollongong Hawks	Cairns Convention Centre, Cairns
NBL TV				Attendance: 4,172

14 October 2012	Townsville Crocodiles	58–82	Perth Wildcats	Townsville Entertainment Centre, Townsville
Network Ten				Attendance: 3,782

=== Round 3 ===
19 October 2012	New Zealand Breakers	73–71	Townsville Crocodiles	North Shore Events Centre, Auckland
Sky Sport				Attendance: 3,749

19 October 2012	Sydney Kings	68–88	Cairns Taipans	Sydney Entertainment Centre, Sydney
One				Attendance: 4,238

20 October 2012	Adelaide 36ers	85–81	Cairns Taipans	Adelaide Arena, Adelaide
NBL TV				Attendance: 4,331

21 October 2012	Melbourne Tigers	65–74	Perth Wildcats	Hisense Arena, Melbourne
Network Ten				Attendance: 5,256

21 October 2012	Wollongong Hawks	84–66	Townsville Crocodiles	WIN Entertainment Centre, Wollongong
NBL TV				Attendance: 3,836

=== Round 4 ===
26 October 2012	Melbourne Tigers	64–75	New Zealand Breakers	Hisense Arena, Melbourne
One				Attendance: 5,130

26 October 2012	Townsville Crocodiles	87–92	Sydney Kings	Townsville Entertainment Centre, Townsville
NBL TV				Attendance: 3,294

28 October 2012	Adelaide 36ers	63–77	Wollongong Hawks	Adelaide Arena, Adelaide
One				Attendance: 4,720

28 October 2012	Cairns Taipans	69–71	Sydney Kings	Cairns Convention Centre, Cairns
NBL TV				Attendance: 4,022

=== Round 5 ===
2 November 2012	New Zealand Breakers	79–76	Sydney Kings	North Shore Events Centre, Auckland
Sky Sport				Attendance: 3,653

2 November 2012	Townsville Crocodiles	80–92 (OT)	Cairns Taipans	Townsville Entertainment Centre, Townsville
One				Attendance: 3,485

4 November 2012	Sydney Kings	81–88	Adelaide 36ers	Sydney Entertainment Centre, Sydney
Network Ten				Attendance: 4,660

4 November 2012	Melbourne Tigers	91–66	Townsville Crocodiles	Hisense Arena, Melbourne
NBL TV				Attendance: 4,044

4 November 2012	Wollongong Hawks	100–67	Perth Wildcats	WIN Entertainment Centre, Wollongong
NBL TV				Attendance: 4,026

=== Round 6 ===
9 November 2012	Sydney Kings	65–51	Wollongong Hawks	Sydney Entertainment Centre, Sydney
One				Attendance: 4,082

9 November 2012	Melbourne Tigers	96–66	Adelaide 36ers	Hisense Arena, Melbourne
NBL TV				Attendance: 5,283

9 November 2012	Townsville Crocodiles	72–81	New Zealand Breakers	Townsville Entertainment Centre, Townsville
NBL TV				Attendance: 3,392

10 November 2012	Cairns Taipans	54–73	New Zealand Breakers	Cairns Convention Centre, Cairns
NBL TV				Attendance: 4,661

11 November 2012	Adelaide 36ers	77–65	Perth Wildcats	Adelaide Arena, Adelaide
Network Ten				Attendance: 3,696

=== Round 7 ===
16 November 2012	New Zealand Breakers	93–63	Townsville Crocodiles	Vector Arena, Auckland
Sky Sport				Attendance: 7,489

16 November 2012	Perth Wildcats	65–69	Adelaide 36ers	Perth Arena, Perth
One				Attendance: 11,562

17 November 2012	Wollongong Hawks	73–59	Cairns Taipans	WIN Entertainment Centre, Wollongong
NBL TV				Attendance: 3,826

18 November 2012	Melbourne Tigers	67–72	Sydney Kings	Hisense Arena, Melbourne
Network Ten				Attendance: 5,810

=== Round 8 ===
22 November 2012	Perth Wildcats	89–64	New Zealand Breakers	Perth Arena, Perth
NBL TV				Attendance: 11,086

23 November 2012	Cairns Taipans	76–83 (OT)	Sydney Kings	Cairns Convention Centre, Cairns
One				Attendance: 4,253

24 November 2012	Townsville Crocodiles	63–68	Perth Wildcats	Townsville Entertainment Centre, Townsville
NBL TV				Attendance: 3,244

25 November 2012	Melbourne Tigers	66–74	Wollongong Hawks	State Netball and Hockey Centre, Melbourne
Network Ten				Attendance: 2,774

=== Round 9 ===
30 November 2012	New Zealand Breakers	94–64	Melbourne Tigers	North Shore Events Centre, Auckland
Sky Sport				Attendance: 4,000

30 November 2012	Townsville Crocodiles	75–73	Adelaide 36ers	Townsville Entertainment Centre, Townsville
NBL TV				Attendance: 3,255

30 November 2012	Perth Wildcats	75–56	Sydney Kings	Perth Arena, Perth
One				Attendance: 11,172

2 December 2012	Adelaide 36ers	85–88	Sydney Kings	Adelaide Arena, Adelaide
Network Ten				Attendance: 4,015

2 December 2012	Cairns Taipans	76–66	Wollongong Hawks	Cairns Convention Centre, Cairns
NBL TV				Attendance: 3,754

=== Round 10 ===
7 December 2012	Perth Wildcats	80–68	Wollongong Hawks	Perth Arena, Perth
One				Attendance: 11,239

8 December 2012	Sydney Kings	75–62	New Zealand Breakers	Sydney Olympic Park Sports Centre, Sydney
NBL TV				Attendance: 4,178

8 December 2012	Townsville Crocodiles	85–84	Melbourne Tigers	Townsville Entertainment Centre, Townsville
NBL TV				Attendance: 3,360

9 December 2012	Adelaide 36ers	85–91 (OT)	Perth Wildcats	Adelaide Arena, Adelaide
Network Ten				Attendance: 3,485

=== Round 11 ===
13 December 2012	New Zealand Breakers	97–76	Cairns Taipans	Vector Arena, Auckland
Sky Sport				Attendance: 6,677

14 December 2012	Wollongong Hawks	78–75	Perth Wildcats	WIN Entertainment Centre, Wollongong
One				Attendance: 3,326

15 December 2012	Adelaide 36ers	75–80	Townsville Crocodiles	Adelaide Arena, Adelaide
NBL TV				Attendance: 4,493

15 December 2012	Sydney Kings	70–63 (OT)	Wollongong Hawks	Sydney Entertainment Centre, Sydney
NBL TV				Attendance: 5,776

16 December 2012	Melbourne Tigers	83–77	Cairns Taipans	State Netball and Hockey Centre, Melbourne
Network Ten				Attendance: 3,242

=== All-Star Game ===
22 December 2012	North All-Stars	114–134	South All-Stars	Adelaide Arena, Adelaide
Network Ten				Attendance: 4,523

=== Round 12 ===
28 December 2012	Adelaide 36ers	66–71	New Zealand Breakers	Adelaide Arena, Adelaide
One				Attendance: 4,740

30 December 2012	Sydney Kings	61–95	Perth Wildcats	Sydney Entertainment Centre, Sydney
Network Ten				Attendance: 6,788

31 December 2012	Cairns Taipans	61–66	New Zealand Breakers	Cairns Convention Centre, Cairns
NBL TV				Attendance: 5,217

31 December 2012	Townsville Crocodiles	86–82	Adelaide 36ers	Townsville Entertainment Centre, Townsville
NBL TV				Attendance: 4,124

31 December 2012	Wollongong Hawks	72–80 (OT)	Melbourne Tigers	WIN Entertainment Centre, Wollongong
NBL TV				Attendance: 4,976

=== Round 13 ===
4 January 2013	Adelaide 36ers	61–75	Townsville Crocodiles	Adelaide Arena, Adelaide
One				Attendance: 3,997

5 January 2013	Sydney Kings	86–82	Adelaide 36ers	Sydney Entertainment Centre, Sydney
NBL TV				Attendance: 4,511

5 January 2013	Wollongong Hawks	76–78	New Zealand Breakers	WIN Entertainment Centre, Wollongong
NBL TV				Attendance: 3,756

5 January 2013	Cairns Taipans	66–85	Perth Wildcats	Cairns Convention Centre, Cairns
NBL TV				Attendance: 4,013

6 January 2013	Melbourne Tigers	74–71	Sydney Kings	State Netball and Hockey Centre, Melbourne
Network Ten				Attendance: 3,500

=== Round 14 ===
11 January 2013	Townsville Crocodiles	78–82	New Zealand Breakers	Townsville Entertainment Centre, Townsville
NBL TV				Attendance: 3,985

11 January 2013	Wollongong Hawks	81–94 (OT)	Cairns Taipans	WIN Entertainment Centre, Wollongong
One				Attendance: 3,456

13 January 2013	Adelaide 36ers	82–64	Sydney Kings	Adelaide Arena, Adelaide
Network Ten				Attendance: 4,489

13 January 2013	Perth Wildcats	73–58	Melbourne Tigers	Perth Arena, Perth
NBL TV				Attendance: 12,336

=== Round 15 ===
17 January 2013	New Zealand Breakers	72–71	Wollongong Hawks	North Shore Events Centre, Auckland
Sky Sport				Attendance: 4,000

18 January 2013	Sydney Kings	74–77	Melbourne Tigers	Sydney Entertainment Centre, Sydney
One				Attendance: 6,281

18 January 2013	Perth Wildcats	86–64	Cairns Taipans	Perth Arena, Perth
NBL TV				Attendance: 11,808

19 January 2013	Townsville Crocodiles	82–74	Wollongong Hawks	Townsville Entertainment Centre, Townsville
NBL TV				Attendance: 3,632

20 January 2013	Adelaide 36ers	66–84	New Zealand Breakers	Adelaide Arena, Adelaide
Network Ten				Attendance: 4,630

=== Round 16 ===
24 January 2013	New Zealand Breakers	95–76	Sydney Kings	North Shore Events Centre, Auckland
Sky Sport				Attendance: 4,000

25 January 2013	Cairns Taipans	85–71	Melbourne Tigers	Cairns Convention Centre, Cairns
NBL TV				Attendance: 4,059

25 January 2013	Perth Wildcats	62–59	Townsville Crocodiles	Perth Arena, Perth
One				Attendance: 10,900

26 January 2013	Wollongong Hawks	74–91	New Zealand Breakers	WIN Entertainment Centre, Wollongong
NBL TV				Attendance: 3,534

27 January 2013	Melbourne Tigers	87–80	Adelaide 36ers	State Netball and Hockey Centre, Melbourne
Network Ten				Attendance: 3,215

=== Round 17 ===
1 February 2013	New Zealand Breakers	98–81	Perth Wildcats	Vector Arena, Auckland
Sky Sport				Attendance: 9,200

1 February 2013	Adelaide 36ers	78–86	Wollongong Hawks	Adelaide Arena, Adelaide
One				Attendance: 3,628

2 February 2013	Townsville Crocodiles	90–78	Sydney Kings	Townsville Entertainment Centre, Townsville
NBL TV				Attendance: 3,648

3 February 2013	Melbourne Tigers	67–64	Cairns Taipans	State Netball and Hockey Centre, Melbourne
Network Ten				Attendance: 3,012

3 February 2013	Perth Wildcats	80–52	Wollongong Hawks	Perth Arena, Perth
NBL TV				Attendance: 11,509

=== Round 18 ===
8 February 2013	Wollongong Hawks	70–77	Melbourne Tigers	WIN Entertainment Centre, Wollongong
NBL TV				Attendance: 3,061

8 February 2013	Perth Wildcats	73–67	Adelaide 36ers	Perth Arena, Perth
One				Attendance: 10,776

9 February 2013	Sydney Kings	94–96 (OT)	New Zealand Breakers	Sydney Entertainment Centre, Sydney
NBL TV				Attendance: 7,124

9 February 2013	Townsville Crocodiles	111–108 (2OT)	Cairns Taipans	Townsville Entertainment Centre, Townsville
NBL TV				Attendance: 4,329

10 February 2013	Adelaide 36ers	71–84	Melbourne Tigers	Adelaide Arena, Adelaide
Network Ten				Attendance: 5,055

=== Round 19 ===
15 February 2013	New Zealand Breakers	92–84	Wollongong Hawks	North Shore Events Centre, Auckland
Sky Sport				Attendance: 4,000

15 February 2013	Sydney Kings	75–78	Cairns Taipans	Sydney Entertainment Centre, Sydney
One				Attendance: 4,117

15 February 2013	Perth Wildcats	80–52	Townsville Crocodiles	Perth Arena, Perth
NBL TV				Attendance: 10,587

16 February 2013	Cairns Taipans	68–71	Adelaide 36ers	Cairns Convention Centre, Cairns
NBL TV				Attendance: 3,911

17 February 2013	Melbourne Tigers	79–83	Perth Wildcats	State Netball and Hockey Centre, Melbourne
Network Ten				Attendance: 3,500

17 February 2013	Wollongong Hawks	86–62	Townsville Crocodiles	WIN Entertainment Centre, Wollongong
NBL TV				Attendance: 3,006

=== Round 20 ===
21 February 2013	Perth Wildcats	78–58	Melbourne Tigers	Perth Arena, Perth
NBL TV				Attendance: 10,447

22 February 2013	Wollongong Hawks	90–91 (OT)	Adelaide 36ers	WIN Entertainment Centre, Wollongong
One				Attendance: 3,024

22 February 2013	Cairns Taipans	78–75	Townsville Crocodiles	Cairns Convention Centre, Cairns
NBL TV				Attendance: 3,881

24 February 2013	Sydney Kings	71–97	Perth Wildcats	Sydney Entertainment Centre, Sydney
Network Ten				Attendance: 5,908

=== Round 21 ===
28 February 2013	New Zealand Breakers	104–79	Adelaide 36ers	Vector Arena, Auckland
Sky Sport				Attendance: 8,500

1 March 2013	Cairns Taipans	78–72	Perth Wildcats	Cairns Convention Centre, Cairns
One				Attendance: 3,820

2 March 2013	Melbourne Tigers	82–88	Wollongong Hawks	State Netball and Hockey Centre, Melbourne
NBL TV				Attendance: 3,500

3 March 2013	Sydney Kings	83–67	Townsville Crocodiles	Sydney Entertainment Centre, Sydney
Network Ten				Attendance: 4,955

=== Round 22 ===
7 March 2013	New Zealand Breakers	80–77	Cairns Taipans	North Shore Events Centre, Auckland
Sky Sport				Attendance: 4,000

8 March 2013	Perth Wildcats	83–56	Sydney Kings	Perth Arena, Perth
One				Attendance: 11,343

9 March 2013	Adelaide 36ers	69–70	Cairns Taipans	Adelaide Arena, Adelaide
NBL TV				Attendance: 5,309

9 March 2013	Townsville Crocodiles	69–64	Wollongong Hawks	Townsville Entertainment Centre, Townsville
NBL TV				Attendance: 3,381

10 March 2013	Melbourne Tigers	74–79	New Zealand Breakers	Hisense Arena, Melbourne
Network Ten				Attendance: 5,192

=== Round 23 ===
14 March 2013	New Zealand Breakers	114–84	Melbourne Tigers	North Shore Events Centre, Auckland
Sky Sport				Attendance: 4,000

15 March 2013	Wollongong Hawks	81–74	Sydney Kings	WIN Entertainment Centre, Wollongong
One				Attendance: 4,016

15 March 2013	Cairns Taipans	76–73	Adelaide 36ers	Cairns Convention Centre, Cairns
NBL TV				Attendance: 4,013

17 March 2013	Townsville Crocodiles	75–73	Melbourne Tigers	Townsville Entertainment Centre, Townsville
Network Ten				Attendance: 3,448

17 March 2013	Perth Wildcats	70–53	Cairns Taipans	Perth Arena, Perth
NBL TV				Attendance: 10,936

=== Round 24 ===
22 March 2013	Sydney Kings	81–74	Townsville Crocodiles	Sydney Entertainment Centre, Sydney
One				Attendance: 6,371

22 March 2013	Cairns Taipans	64–66	Melbourne Tigers	Cairns Convention Centre, Cairns
NBL TV				Attendance: 4,932

22 March 2013	Perth Wildcats	73–58	New Zealand Breakers	Perth Arena, Perth
NBL TV				Attendance: 12,381

23 March 2013	Wollongong Hawks	74–64	Adelaide 36ers	WIN Entertainment Centre, Wollongong
NBL TV				Attendance: 4,512

24 March 2013	Melbourne Tigers	78–70	Townsville Crocodiles	Hisense Arena, Melbourne
Network Ten				Attendance: 5,209

== Ladder ==
Pos	2012–13 NBL season											
Pos	Team	Pld	W	L	PCT	Last 5	Streak	Home	Away	PF	PA	PP
1	New Zealand Breakers	28	24	4	85.71%	4–1	L1	13–1	11–3	2296	2070	110.92%
2	Perth Wildcats	28	22	6	78.57%	4–1	W3	13–1	9–5	2195	1885	116.45%
3	Wollongong Hawks	28	13	15	46.43%	3–2	W2	8–6	5–9	2104	2087	100.82%
4	Sydney Kings^{1}	28	12	16	42.86%	2–3	W1	7–7	5–9	2102	2222	94.60%
5	Melbourne Tigers^{1}	28	12	16	42.86%	2–3	W2	7–7	5–9	2092	2163	96.72%
6	Cairns Taipans	28	11	17	39.29%	2–3	L2	6–8	5–9	2074	2137	97.05%
7	Townsville Crocodiles	28	10	18	35.71%	2–3	L2	8–6	2–12	2063	2242	92.02%
8	Adelaide 36ers	28	8	20	28.57%	1–4	L4	4–10	4–10	2091	2211	94.57%

Updated to match(es) played on 24 March 2013. Source: NBL.com.au

The NBL tie-breaker system as outlined in the NBL Rules and Regulations states that in the case of an identical win–loss record, the results in games played between the teams will determine order of seeding.

^{1}Head-to-Head between Sydney Kings and Melbourne Tigers (2-2). Sydney Kings won For and Against (+2).

=== Ladder Progression ===
- Numbers highlighted in green indicate that the team finished the round inside the top four.
- Numbers highlighted in blue indicates the team finished first on the ladder in that round.
- Numbers highlighted in red indicates the team finished last place on the ladder in that round.

2012–13 NBL season
Team	1	2	3	4	5	6	7	8	9	10	11	12	13	14	15	16	17	18	19	20	21	22	23	24
Adelaide 36ers	1	3	3	5	4	4	3	4	5	5	5	5	7	6	7	8	8	8	8	8	8	8	8	8
Cairns Taipans	3	4	5	6	5	6	6	6	6	6	6	7	8	7	8	6	7	7	7	6	6	6	4	6
Melbourne Tigers	8	7	7	7	7	7	7	7	7	7	7	6	5	5	5	5	5	3	3	3	5	5	6	5
New Zealand Breakers	7	6	4	3	2	1	1	2	1	2	1	1	1	1	1	1	1	1	1	1	1	1	1	1
Perth Wildcats	2	1	1	1	3	3	5	3	3	1	2	2	2	2	2	2	2	2	2	2	2	2	2	2
Sydney Kings	5	5	6	4	6	5	4	5	4	4	4	4	3	3	3	3	3	4	5	5	4	4	5	4
Townsville Crocodiles	6	8	8	8	8	8	8	8	8	8	8	8	6	8	6	7	6	6	6	7	7	7	7	7
Wollongong Hawks	4	2	2	2	1	2	2	1	2	3	3	3	4	4	4	4	4	5	4	4	3	3	3	3

== Finals ==
The 2012–13 National Basketball League Finals will be played in March and April 2013, consisting of two best-of-three semi-final and final series, where the higher seed hosts the first and third games.

=== Playoff Seedings ===
1. New Zealand Breakers
2. Perth Wildcats
3. Wollongong Hawks
4. Sydney Kings

The NBL tie-breaker system as outlined in the NBL Rules and Regulations states that in the case of an identical win–loss record, the results in games played between the teams will determine order of seeding.

Under this system, Melbourne did not qualify for the playoffs by equalling Sydney's win–loss record, as the latter held advantage in the tiebreaker (2-2, +2 points).

=== Playoff bracket ===
Semifinals
1	New Zealand Breakers	81	99	X
4	Sydney Kings	64	88	X
2	Perth Wildcats	93	85	X
3	Wollongong Hawks	65	81	X

Grand Final
1	New Zealand Breakers	79	70	X
2	Perth Wildcats	67	66	X

=== Semi-finals ===
28 March 2013	New Zealand Breakers	81–64	Sydney Kings	Vector Arena, Auckland
Sky Sport				Attendance: 8,314

28 March 2013	Perth Wildcats	93–65	Wollongong Hawks	Perth Arena, Perth
One				Attendance: 10,904

31 March 2013	Wollongong Hawks	81–85 (OT)	Perth Wildcats	WIN Entertainment Centre, Wollongong
Network Ten				Attendance: 3,026

1 April 2013	Sydney Kings	88–99	New Zealand Breakers	Sydney Entertainment Centre, Sydney
One				Attendance: 4,908

=== Grand Final ===
7 April 2013	New Zealand Breakers	79–67	Perth Wildcats	Vector Arena, Auckland
Sky Sport				Attendance: 9,330

12 April 2013	Perth Wildcats	66–70	New Zealand Breakers	Perth Arena, Perth
One				Attendance: 13,527

== Season statistics ==
=== Statistics leaders ===
Category	Player	Games played	Totals	Average
Points per game	Ben Madgen (Sydney Kings)	28	502	17.9
Rebounds per game	Daniel Johnson (Adelaide 36ers)	28	227	8.1
Assists per game	Cedric Jackson (New Zealand Breakers)	28	200	7.1
Steals per game	Cedric Jackson (New Zealand Breakers)	28	79	2.8
Blocks per game	Alex Pledger (New Zealand Breakers)	27	38	1.4
Field goal percentage	Jeremiah Trueman (Perth Wildcats)	28	45-71	63.4%
Three-point field goal percentage	Oscar Forman (Wollongong Hawks)	28	73-153	47.7%
Free throw percentage	Ben Madgen (Sydney Kings)	28	95-111	85.6%

Note: regular season only (minimum 14 games)

=== Attendances ===
Team	Hosted	Average	Highest	Lowest	Total
Adelaide 36ers	14	4,327	5,309	3,485	60,576
Cairns Taipans	14	4,227	5,217	3,754	59,181
Melbourne Tigers	14	4,191	5,810	2,774	58,667
New Zealand Breakers	14	5,278	9,200	3,653	73,893
Perth Wildcats	14	11,292	12,381	10,447	158,082
Sydney Kings	14	5,241	7,124	4,082	73,375
Townsville Crocodiles	14	3,597	4,329	3,244	50,359
Wollongong Hawks	14	3,763	4,976	3,006	52,678
Totals	112	5,239	12,381	2,774	586,811

Note: regular season only

=== Top 10 Attendances ===
Attendance	Round	Date	Home	Score	Away	Venue	Weekday	Time of Day
13,527	GF	12 April 2013	Perth Wildcats	66-70	New Zealand Breakers	Perth Arena	Friday	Night
12,381	24	22 March 2013	Perth Wildcats	73-58	New Zealand Breakers	Perth Arena	Friday	Night
12,336	14	13 January 2013	Perth Wildcats	73-58	Melbourne Tigers	Perth Arena	Sunday	Afternoon
11,808	15	18 January 2013	Perth Wildcats	86-64	Cairns Taipans	Perth Arena	Friday	Night
11,562	7	16 November 2012	Perth Wildcats	65-69	Adelaide 36ers	Perth Arena	Friday	Night
11,509	17	3 February 2013	Perth Wildcats	80-52	Wollongong Hawks	Perth Arena	Sunday	Afternoon
11,343	22	8 March 2013	Perth Wildcats	83-56	Sydney Kings	Perth Arena	Friday	Night
11,239	10	7 December 2012	Perth Wildcats	80-68	Wollongong Hawks	Perth Arena	Friday	Night
11,172	9	30 November 2012	Perth Wildcats	75-56	Sydney Kings	Perth Arena	Friday	Night
11,086	8	22 November 2012	Perth Wildcats	89-64	New Zealand Breakers	Perth Arena	Thursday	Night

== Awards ==
=== Player of the Week ===
Round	Player	Team
1	Matthew Knight	Perth Wildcats
2	Corin Henry	Sydney Kings
3	Mika Vukona	New Zealand Breakers
4	Ben Madgen	Sydney Kings
5	Adris Deleon	Wollongong Hawks
6	Cedric Jackson	New Zealand Breakers
7	Daniel Johnson	Adelaide 36ers
8	Kevin Lisch	Perth Wildcats
9	Cedric Jackson	New Zealand Breakers
10	Corin Henry	Sydney Kings
11	Cedric Jackson	New Zealand Breakers
12	Lucas Walker	Melbourne Tigers
13	Gary Ervin	Townsville Crocodiles
14	Daniel Johnson	Adelaide 36ers
15	Ian Crosswhite	Sydney Kings
16	Daryl Corletto	New Zealand Breakers
17	Cedric Jackson	New Zealand Breakers
18	Peter Crawford	Townsville Crocodiles
19	Adris Deleon	Wollongong Hawks
20	Shawn Redhage	Perth Wildcats
21	Adris Deleon	Wollongong Hawks
22	Alex Pledger	New Zealand Breakers
23	Alex Pledger	New Zealand Breakers
24	Larry Davidson	Wollongong Hawks

=== Player of the Month ===
Month	Player	Team
October	Ben Madgen	Sydney Kings
November	Cedric Jackson	New Zealand Breakers
December	Gary Ervin	Townsville Crocodiles
January	Gary Ervin	Townsville Crocodiles
February	Cedric Jackson	New Zealand Breakers
March	Adris Deleon	Wollongong Hawks
March	Chris Goulding	Melbourne Tigers

=== Coach of the Month ===
Month	Player	Team
October	Gordie McLeod	Wollongong Hawks
November	Andrej Lemanis	New Zealand Breakers
December	Paul Woolpert	Townsville Crocodiles
January	Andrej Lemanis	New Zealand Breakers
February	Rob Beveridge	Perth Wildcats
March	Gordie McLeod	Wollongong Hawks

=== Season ===
The end-of-season awards ceremony was held in the Palladium Room at Crown Casino, Melbourne on Sunday, 24 March 2013.

- Most Valuable Player (Andrew Gaze Trophy): Cedric Jackson, New Zealand Breakers
- Rookie of the Year: Cameron Gliddon, Cairns Taipans
- Best Defensive Player: Damian Martin, Perth Wildcats
- Best Sixth Man: Adris Deleon, Wollongong Hawks
- Most Improved Player: Ben Madgen, Sydney Kings
- Coach of the Year (Lindsay Gaze Trophy): Andrej Lemanis, New Zealand Breakers
- Referee of the Year: Michael Aylen
- All-NBL First Team:
  - Cedric Jackson - New Zealand Breakers
  - Kevin Lisch - Perth Wildcats
  - Ben Madgen - Sydney Kings
  - Seth Scott - Melbourne Tigers
  - Matthew Knight - Perth Wildcats
- All-NBL Second Team:
  - Gary Ervin - Townsville Crocodiles
  - Jonny Flynn - Melbourne Tigers
  - Damian Martin - Perth Wildcats
  - Mika Vukona - New Zealand Breakers
  - Daniel Johnson - Adelaide 36ers
- All-NBL Third Team:
  - Jamar Wilson - Cairns Taipans
  - Adam Gibson - Adelaide 36ers
  - Thomas Abercrombie - New Zealand Breakers
  - Shawn Redhage - Perth Wildcats
  - Ian Crosswhite - Sydney Kings

=== Finals ===
- Grand Final Series MVP (Larry Sengstock Medal): Cedric Jackson, New Zealand Breakers

== See also ==
- 2012–13 NBL squads
- 2012–13 Adelaide 36ers season
- 2012–13 New Zealand Breakers season
- 2012 NBL All-Star Game
