= Daniel Jackson (basketball) =

Australian basketball player (born 1988)

Personal information
- Born: 26 April 1988 (age 38) Wollongong, New South Wales, Australia
- Listed height: 200 cm (6 ft 7 in)

Career information
- High school: Illawarra Sports (Wollongong, New South Wales)
- Playing career: 2006–2016
- Position: Small forward

Career history
- 2006: Australian Institute of Sport
- 2007: Canberra Gunners
- 2007–2013: Wollongong Hawks
- 2008: Illawarra Hawks (Waratah)
- 2009: Mackay Meteors
- 2010: Canberra Gunners
- 2011–2013: Illawarra Hawks (Waratah)
- 2014–2016: Canberra Gunners

Career highlights
- Waratah League champion (2011); Waratah League Grand Final MVP (2011)

Daniel Alexander Jackson (born 26 April 1988) is an Australian former professional basketball player who played six seasons in the National Basketball League (NBL) for the Wollongong Hawks.

== Early life ==
Jackson was born in Wollongong, New South Wales. He attended Illawarra Sports High School, where he was honoured with Hall of Fame induction.

== Basketball playing career ==
In 2006, Jackson attended the Australian Institute of Sport (AIS) and played for the AIS men's team in the South East Australian Basketball League (SEABL). In 2007, he played for the Canberra Gunners in the SEABL.

Between 2007 and 2013, Jackson played six seasons in the National Basketball League (NBL) for the Wollongong Hawks. He averaged 1.4 points in 120 career games. During this time, he played in the off-seasons for the Illawarra Hawks in the Waratah League (2008), Mackay Meteors in the Queensland Basketball League (2009), Canberra Gunners in the SEABL (2010), and again at Illawarra in 2011, 2012 and 2013. He helped Illawarra win the 2011 Waratah League championship while earning grand final MVP honours.

Jackson's final three seasons were in the SEABL for the Gunners in 2014, 2015 and 2016.

=== National team ===
In 2007, Jackson represented Australia at the FIBA Under-19 World Championship, where he averaged 10.2 points and 4.9 rebounds per game.

== Basketball administration ==
After transitioning to coaching and administrative roles, Jackson served in various positions at Basketball ACT, including Executive Manager of Group Operations and Head of Competitions and Game Development.

Between 2018 and 2021, Jackson served as operations manager for the University of Canberra Capitals in the Women's National Basketball League (WNBL).

In June 2022, Jackson was appointed general manager of the Launceston Tornadoes in the NBL1 South.

In May 2024, Jackson was appointed general manager of the Bendigo Spirit in the WNBL. The Spirit made the WNBL Grand Final in 2024–25.

== Personal life ==
Jackson's partner is Australian Opals centre Marianna Tolo.
