= Seth Scott =

American basketball player

Personal information
- Born: November 2, 1981 (age 45)
- Listed height: 6 ft 10 in (2.08 m)
- Listed weight: 220 lb (100 kg)

Career information
- High school: Mountain View (Orem, Utah)
- College: Utah Valley (2000–2002); Portland State (2002–2004)
- NBA draft: 2004: undrafted
- Playing career: 2004–2014
- Position: Power forward / center

Career history
- 2004–2005: Marso-Carmo Suzuki NYKK
- 2005–2006: AEK Larnaca
- 2006–2007: Marso-Carmo Suzuki NYKK
- 2007–2008: JA Vichy
- 2008: Vendée Challans Basket
- 2008–2009: Denek Bat Urcuit
- 2009: Rouen Métropole Basket
- 2010–2011: Avenir Serrelous Horsarrieu
- 2012: Pioneros de Los Mochis
- 2012–2013: Melbourne Tigers
- 2013: Caciques de Humacao
- 2013: Pioneros de Quintana Roo
- 2013–2014: Panteras de Aguascalientes
- 2014: Brujos de Guayama

Career highlights
- All-NBL First Team (2013)

Seth Scott (born November 2, 1981) is an American former professional basketball player. He played college basketball for Utah Valley and Portland State before playing professionally in Hungary, Cyprus, France, Mexico, Australia and Puerto Rico. He was named in the All-NBL First Team in 2013 playing for the Melbourne Tigers.

== High school career ==
Scott attended Mountain View High School in Orem, Utah, where he was an All-Region and All-State selection. As a senior in 1999–2000, he averaged 18.6 points, 8.2 rebounds and 2.9 blocked shots per game as his team went 20–4 and placed third in state.

== College career ==
Scott was considered a "non-qualifier" out of high school and subsequently played his first two seasons of college basketball at Utah Valley State College.

As a freshman with the Wolverines in 2000–01, Scott averaged 11.6 points and 6.8 rebounds per game. As a sophomore in 2001–02, he averaged 12.4 points and 5.9 rebounds and distinguished himself as an All-Conference forward.

In 2002, Scott transferred to Portland State University.

As a junior with Vikings in 2002–03, Scott started 23 of the 26 games he played in. He was the team's third-leading scorer (12.4) and second-leading rebounder (6.0) while leading the team in blocked shots (30) and field goal percentage (.475). He had 25 points and 11 rebounds against the Oregon Ducks on January 15, 2003.

As a senior in 2003–04, Scott averaged 6.6 points and 4.7 rebounds in 18 games.

== Professional career ==
For his first professional season in 2004–05, Scott played in Hungary for Marso-Carmo Suzuki NYKK of the Nemzeti Bajnokság I/A. In 25 games, he averaged 20.5 points, 10.0 rebounds, 1.5 assists and 2.9 steals per game.

For the 2005–06 season, Scott returned to Marso-Carmo Suzuki NYKK but left after 11 games. He averaged 14.6 points, 8.5 rebounds, 1.7 assists and 2.5 steals per game. In December 2005, he moved to Cyprus to play for AEK Larnaca.

For the 2006–07 season, Scott returned to Marso-Carmo Suzuki NYKK. In 30 games, he averaged 13.3 points, 6.9 rebounds and 2.1 steals per game.

On September 6, 2007, Scott signed with JA Vichy of the LNB Pro A. He parted ways with the team on January 31, 2008. In nine games, he averaged 3.2 points and 1.9 rebounds per game. In February 2008, he joined Vendée Challans Basket of the French N1.

For the 2008–09 season, Scott joined Denek Bat Urcuit of the French NM1. In 19 games, he averaged 17.2 points, 5.9 rebounds and 2.8 assists per game.

In October 2009, Scott joined Rouen Métropole Basket of the LNB Pro A but played only one game due to a right knee injury.

For the 2010–11 season, Scott played for Avenir Serrelous Horsarrieu in the French NM2.

In April 2012, Scott joined Pioneros de Los Mochis of the Mexican CIBACOPA. In 32 games, he averaged 22.4 points, 8.0 rebounds and 1.8 assists per game.

On August 2, 2012, Scott signed with the Melbourne Tigers in Australia for the 2012–13 NBL season. In December 2012, he played in the NBL All-Star Game. In 27 games, he averaged 11.6 points and 6.2 rebounds per game. He was subsequently named to the All-NBL First Team.

Following the NBL season, Scott joined Caciques de Humacao of the Puerto Rican Baloncesto Superior Nacional (BSN). He was released by Caciques on May 28, 2013. In 21 games, he averaged 8.4 points, 7.5 rebounds, 1.2 assists and 1.1 blocks per game.

For the 2013–14 season, Scott joined Pioneros de Quintana Roo of the Mexican LNBP. He played 10 games for Pioneros between September 26 and November 4, averaging 11.0 points, 5.3 rebounds and 1.0 assists per game. In December 2013, he joined Panteras de Aguascalientes for the rest of the season. In 17 games, he averaged 16.2 points, 7.9 rebounds, 1.7 assists and 1.0 blocks per game.

In March 2014, Scott joined Brujos de Guayama of the BSN. In 11 games, he averaged 5.0 points, 3.7 rebounds and 2.2 assists per game.

== National team ==
In August 2001, Scott played for Team USA at the Tournament of the Americas in Argentina.

== Personal life ==
Scott is the son of Ray and Sandy Scott and has four sisters, Shannon, Raegen, Lindsay and Sydney, and one brother, Zach.

Scott and his wife have a daughter.
