= Tyson Demos =

Australian basketball player and coach (born 1988)

Personal information
- Born: 3 July 1988 (age 38) Wollongong, New South Wales, Australia
- Listed height: 190 cm (6 ft 3 in)
- Listed weight: 92 kg (203 lb)

Career information
- High school: Figtree (Wollongong, New South Wales)
- Playing career: 2005–2017
- Position: Shooting guard
- Coaching career: 2019–present

Career history

Playing
- 2005: Illawarra Seahawks
- 2006–2007: Australian Institute of Sport
- 2007–2010: Gold Coast Blaze
- 2008–2010: Brisbane Spartans
- 2010–2016: Wollongong / Illawarra Hawks
- 2011–2012: Illawarra Hawks (Waratah League)
- 2015: Mackay Meteors
- 2017: Illawarra Hawks (Waratah League)

Coaching
- 2019–2020: Illawarra Hawks (asst.)

Career highlights
- QBL champion (2015)

Tyson Emmanuell Demos (born 3 July 1988) is an Australian former professional basketball player and one-time assistant coach in the National Basketball League (NBL). He played nine seasons in the NBL with the Gold Coast Blaze and Illawarra Hawks.

== Early life and career ==
Born and bred in the Illawarra region, Demos is a junior product of the Illawarra Basketball Association and attended the Australian Institute of Sport (AIS). In 2006 and 2007, he played for the AIS men's team in the South East Australian Basketball League. He also represented Australia at the 2007 FIBA Under-19 World Championship in Serbia.

== NBL career ==
Demos signed his first professional contract with the Gold Coast Blaze in 2007. He played three seasons with the Blaze before returning home and joining the Wollongong Hawks for the 2010–11 NBL season. He played six seasons with the Hawks, with his sixth and final season seeing him play in just six games after sustaining a knee injury in November 2015. He subsequently sat out the 2016–17 NBL season and did not return to the league.

During his NBL career, Demos played in various state leagues during the off-seasons. Between 2008 and 2010, he played in the SEABL for the Brisbane Spartans; between 2011 and 2012, he played in the Waratah League for the Illawarra Hawks; and in 2015, he played in the QBL for the Mackay Meteors and won a championship.

Demos' final stint came in 2017 with the Illawarra Hawks in the Waratah League.

== Coaching career ==
On 30 August 2019, Demos was appointed assistant coach of the Illawarra Hawks for the 2019–20 NBL season.
