= Ian Crosswhite =

Australian basketball player

Personal information
- Born: 23 November 1982 (age 43) Melbourne, Victoria, Australia
- Listed height: 210 cm (6 ft 11 in)
- Listed weight: 115 kg (254 lb)

Career information
- High school: Lake Ginninderra (Canberra, ACT)
- College: Oregon (2002–2005)
- NBA draft: 2006: undrafted
- Playing career: 2000–2013
- Position: Centre

Career history
- 2000–2001: Australian Institute of Sport
- 2005: Central Oregon Hotshots
- 2005–2008: Sydney Kings
- 2006: Manly Warringah Sea Eagles
- 2008–2012: Cairns Taipans
- 2009: Hume City Broncos
- 2012–2013: Sydney Kings

Career highlights
- All-NBL Third Team (2013)

Ian Clyde Steel Crosswhite (born 23 November 1982) is an Australian former professional basketball player. He played college basketball for the Oregon Ducks in the United States before playing eight seasons in the Australian National Basketball League (NBL) between 2005 and 2013.

== Early life ==
Crosswhite was born in Melbourne, Victoria. He grew up in New South Wales and played for the state's Under 16, Under 18 and Under 20 teams. In 2001, he captained the New South Wales squad to the silver medal at the Under 20 national championships and was later named the Junior Player of the Year by Basketball Australia.

In 2000 and 2001, Crosswhite attended the Australian Institute of Sport (AIS) and Lake Ginninderra College in Canberra. He played for the AIS men's team in the South East Australian Basketball League (SEABL) both years, averaging 15 points and eight rebounds per game. In 2000, he led Lake Ginninderra to the national schools championship.

== College career ==
In 2001, Crosswhite moved to the United States to attend the University of Oregon. He joined the Ducks men's basketball team but redshirted the 2001–02 season.

Crosswhite debuted for the Ducks in 2002–03 season, playing 33 games and averaging 9.3 points and 3.8 rebounds per game. He helped the team win the Pac-10 championship and was named Pac-10 All-Freshman Honorable Mention.

As a sophomore in 2003–04, Crosswhite played 31 games and averaged 12.5 points, 5.0 rebounds and 1.8 assists per game. He helped the Ducks to the Pac-10 tournament semi-finals and NIT Final Four and was named All-Pac-10 Honorable Mention.

As a junior in 2004–05, Crosswhite averaged 8.4 points, 5.7 rebounds and 1.8 assists in 19 games before being permanently dismissed by the Ducks in February 2005 due to reported marijuana use.

== Professional career ==
=== Sydney Kings (2005–2008) ===
After leaving the University of Oregon, Crosswhite played for the Central Oregon Hotshots in the International Basketball League.

In September 2005, Crosswhite joined the Sydney Kings of the Australian National Basketball League (NBL). He helped the Kings reach the 2006 NBL grand final series. In 30 games during the 2005–06 NBL season, he averaged 6.8 points, 4.7 rebounds and 1.8 assists per game.

After a two-game off-season stint with the Manly Warringah Sea Eagles in the Waratah League, Crosswhite returned to the Kings for the 2006–07 NBL season. In 34 games, he averaged 7.6 points, 4.9 rebounds and 1.3 assists per game.

In the 2007–08 NBL season, Crosswhite started all 37 games and helped the Kings return to the grand final series. He averaged 8.8 points, 6.1 rebounds and 1.7 assists per game.

=== Cairns Taipans (2008–2012) ===
In July 2008, Crosswhite signed with the Cairns Taipans. In 29 games during the 2008–09 NBL season, he averaged 11.0 points, 6.1 rebounds and 1.7 assists per game.

After playing for the Hume City Broncos in the Big V during the off-season, Crosswhite returned to the Taipans for the 2009–10 NBL season. In 26 games, he averaged 7.4 points, 4.9 rebounds and 1.1 assists per game.

In the 2010–11 NBL season, Crosswhite helped the Taipans reach the grand final series. He was nominated for the league's most improved award and was named the Taipans' best defensive player. In 34 games, he averaged 11.6 points, 6.7 rebounds and 2.4 assists per game.

Crosswhite served as co-captain of the Taipans in the 2011–12 NBL season. In 22 games, he averaged 7.5 points, 7.7 rebounds and 3.1 assists per game.

=== Return to Sydney (2012–2013) ===
On 15 May 2012, Crosswhite signed with the Sydney Kings. He was set to play in the 2012 NBL All-Star Game but withdrew due to an ankle injury. In 29 games during the 2012–13 NBL season, he averaged 10.2 points, 7.6 rebounds and 1.2 assists per game. He was subsequently named to the All-NBL Third Team.

On 5 July 2013, Crosswhite announced his retirement from basketball.

== National team career ==
In 2000, Crosswhite played for the Australian Under 18 National Team at the Albert Schweitzer Tournament in Germany. The following year, he played with the Australian Under 21 National Team. In 2005, he played for the Australian University National Team at the World University Games in Turkey.

== Personal life ==
Crosswhite's father, Perry Crosswhite, is a former national team member and Melbourne Tigers legend. His mother Janice is a former hurdler. He has three sisters. His older sister Anna played in the WNBL.
