= Cedric Jackson =

American basketball player (born 1986)

Personal information
- Born: March 5, 1986 (age 40) Alamogordo, New Mexico, U.S.
- Listed height: 6 ft 3 in (1.91 m)
- Listed weight: 209 lb (95 kg)

Career information
- High school: Medical Lake (Medical Lake, Washington); Northern Burlington County (Columbus, New Jersey)
- College: St. John's (2004–2006); Cleveland State (2007–2009)
- NBA draft: 2009: undrafted
- Playing career: 2009–2019
- Position: Point guard
- Number: 9, 11

Career history
- 2009–2010: Erie BayHawks
- 2010: Cleveland Cavaliers
- 2010: San Antonio Spurs
- 2010: Washington Wizards
- 2010–2011: Idaho Stampede
- 2011: Enel Brindisi
- 2011–2013: New Zealand Breakers
- 2013–2014: Union Olimpija
- 2014–2016: New Zealand Breakers
- 2015: Mets de Guaynabo
- 2016: Atléticos de San Germán
- 2016: Melbourne United
- 2018: Yakima SunKings
- 2018–2019: Illawarra Hawks

Career highlights
- NAPB champion (2018); 3× NBL champion (2012, 2013, 2015); 2× NBL Grand Final MVP (2013, 2015); NBL Most Valuable Player (2013); 3× All-NBL First Team (2012, 2013, 2015); 5× NBL assists leader (2012, 2013, 2015–2017); NBA D-League All-Star (2011); NBA D-League All-Defensive Second Team (2011); 2× Second-team All-Horizon League (2008, 2009); Horizon League Defensive Player of the Year (2009); 2× Horizon League All-Defensive Team (2008, 2009); Horizon League All-Newcomer Team (2008)
- Stats at NBA.com
- Stats at Basketball Reference

Cedric Lamar Jackson (born March 5, 1986) is an American former professional basketball player. He played two years of college basketball for Cleveland State University, where he made a notable game-winning full-court shot against Syracuse and helped the Vikings past Wake Forest in the first round of the 2009 NCAA Tournament.

As a pro, Jackson made a name for himself playing for the New Zealand Breakers in the Australian National Basketball League (NBL). Over four seasons with the Breakers, he guided the club to four grand final appearances and three championships. He was crowned the NBL's Most Valuable Player in 2013, garnered Grand Final MVP honors in 2013 and 2015, and was named to the All-NBL First Team in 2012, 2013 and 2015. He led the NBL in assists in each of his four seasons with the Breakers, becoming the only player in NBL history to lead the league in assists in his first four seasons in the league.

== High school and college career ==
As a high school freshman living in Medical Lake, Washington, Jackson attended Medical Lake High School in 2000–01, where he steered the Cardinals to within a point of a trip to the state tournament. He was enrolled as a sophomore at Ferris High before his Air Force-obligated family moved east. Jackson subsequently enrolled at Northern Burlington County Regional High School in Columbus, New Jersey. He was a first-team all-state selection his senior year among other selections and averaged 26 points per game.

Jackson began his collegiate career at St. John's University in Queens, New York. On April 4, 2006, it was announced that Jackson was transferring from St. John's to Cleveland State. His decision was based in part on a desire for more playing time. After sitting out the 2006–07 season due to NCAA transfer regulations, Jackson starred at Cleveland State, helping them make two straight postseason appearances in 2008 and 2009. In 71 games for the Vikings over two seasons, Jackson averaged 12.3 points, 5.3 rebounds, 5.2 assists and 2.8 steals per game.

== Professional career ==
=== NBA, D-League and Italy (2009–11) ===
After going undrafted in the 2009 NBA draft, Jackson joined the Erie BayHawks of the NBA Development League for the 2009–10 season. In 34 games, he averaged 16.4 points, 5.6 rebounds, 7.4 assists and 2.1 steals per game. Between January and April, Jackson had multiple stints in the NBA with the Cleveland Cavaliers, San Antonio Spurs and Washington Wizards. In 12 NBA games during the 2009–10 season, Jackson averaged 1.7 points and 1.2 assists per game.

After spending preseason with the Cavaliers, Jackson re-joined the BayHawks for the 2010–11 season. On December 29, 2010, he was traded by Erie to the Idaho Stampede. In 50 games during the 2010–11 season, Jackson averaged 13.1 points, 5.5 rebounds, 7.3 assists and 2.1 steals per game.

On April 18, 2011, Jackson signed with Italian team Enel Brindisi. He played two games for Brindisi, totalling 20 points, 10 rebounds and six assists.

=== New Zealand Breakers (2011–13) ===
On August 12, 2011, Jackson signed with the New Zealand Breakers for the 2011–12 NBL season. He helped the Breakers win the minor premiership with a 21–7 record before guiding them to the NBL Grand Final, where they defeated the Perth Wildcats 2–1. Jackson was the club's MVP, finished fourth in the NBL MVP voting, and was named in the All-NBL First Team. Jackson also led the league in both assists (6.4) and steals (2.5) per game during the regular season.

After playing for the San Antonio Spurs during the 2012 NBA Summer League, Jackson re-signed with the Breakers for the 2012–13 NBL season in August. On November 30, 2012, Jackson recorded his first career triple-double with 28 points, 10 rebounds and 10 assists against the Melbourne Tigers. It was only the second triple-double recorded since the NBL went to 40-minute games at the start of the 2009–10 season. On February 5, 2013, Jackson was named Player of the Week for Round 17, picking up his fourth NBL weekly award of the season. On March 24, Jackson was named the NBL's Most Valuable Player for the 2012–13 season. He also earned All-NBL First Team honors for the second straight year, and led the league in assists (7.1) and steals (2.8) for the second straight year. The Breakers were minor premiers once again with a 24–4 record before returning to the NBL Grand Final, where Jackson won his second championship with a 2–0 defeat of the Wildcats. Jackson subsequently earned Grand Final MVP honors.

=== Slovenia (2013–14) ===
After playing for the Miami Heat and Portland Trail Blazers during the 2013 NBA Summer League, Jackson signed a one-year deal with Union Olimpija of the Slovenian Basketball League on August 3, 2013. He endured several injuries during the season, leading to the club terminating his contract on March 6, 2014. He averaged just 4.3 points, 2.8 rebounds and 3.0 assists in 14 Adriatic League games, and 5.9 points, 3.8 rebounds and 3.8 assists in 13 Eurocup games.

=== Second Breakers stint (2014–16) ===
On July 17, 2014, Jackson signed a two-year deal with the New Zealand Breakers, returning to the club for a second stint. In December 2014, Jackson earned Player of the Week honors for Round 10. On January 18, 2015, Jackson recorded his second career triple-double with 16 points, 10 rebounds and 11 assists in an 88–75 win over Melbourne United. His third career triple-double came on February 12 in a loss to the Adelaide 36ers, with 11 points, 11 rebounds and 11 assists. Following his 22 points and game-winner against the Perth Wildcats on February 15, he was named Player of the Week for Round 19. He was also named Player of the Month for February. For the third time in three seasons, Jackson earned All-NBL first team honors and led the league in assists (6.0) per game. After finishing second with a 19–9 record, the Breakers went on to reach the NBL Grand Final, where they defeated the Cairns Taipans 2–0, with Jackson claiming his third championship and second Grand Final MVP award. In the grand final series, he scored 22 points in game one and 15 points in game two. He became the first player in NBL history to win three NBL championships from his first three seasons. Following the NBL season, he had a 13-game stint in Puerto Rico with Mets de Guaynabo.

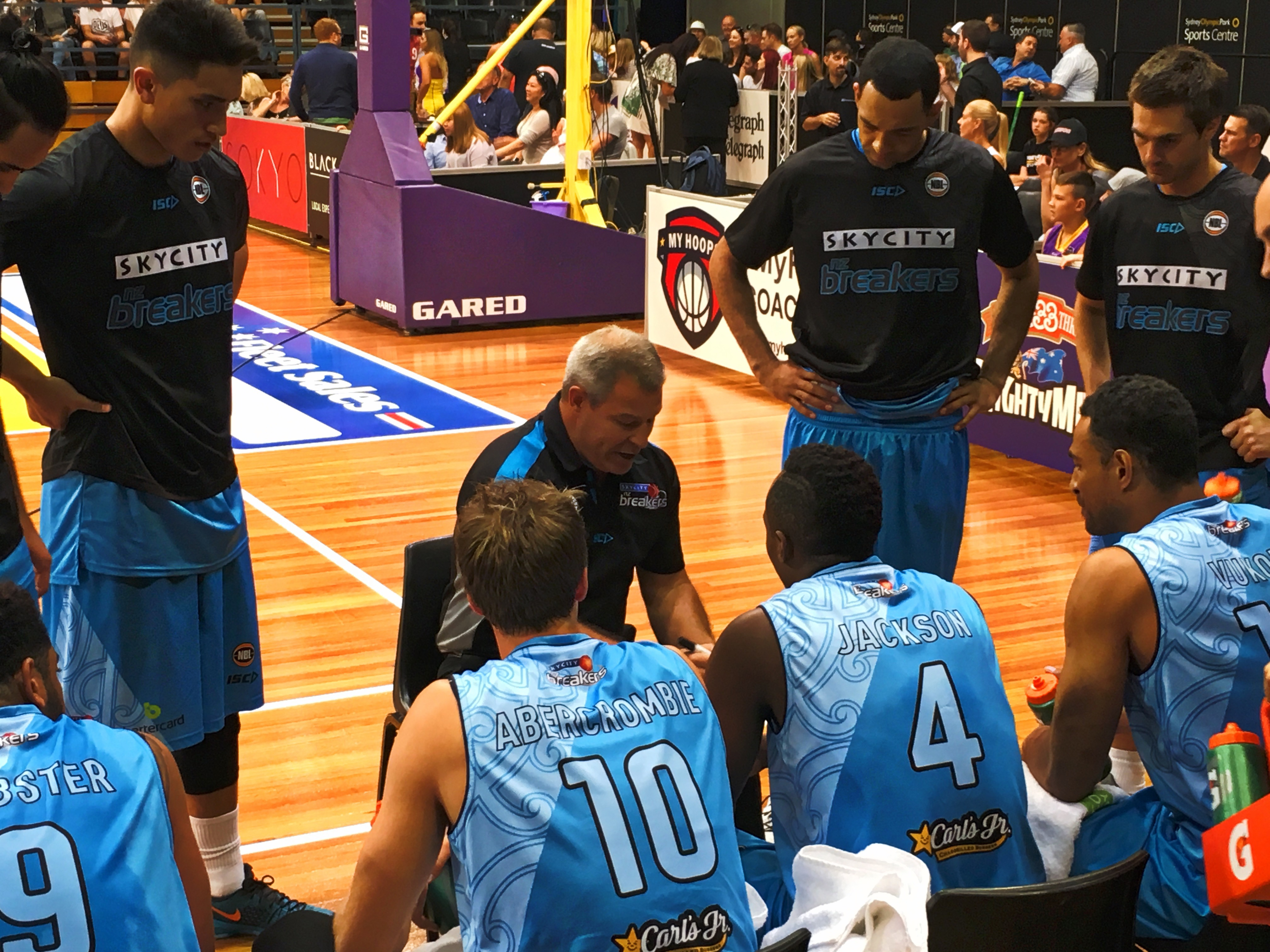
Jackson on the bench with the Breakers in December 2015

On October 11, 2015, in his 99th NBL game, Jackson recorded his fourth career triple-double with 14 points, 10 rebounds and a career-high 14 assists in the Breakers' 89–81 win over the Townsville Crocodiles. Jackson garnered 77 wins over his first 99 games in the NBL (77.7%), a mark that ranks first in NBL history. In his 100th game played just three days later against the Illawarra Hawks, Jackson had a career-worst performance. In 28 minutes of action, he failed to make a field goal, going 0-of-7 from the field, 0-of-3 from three-point range, and 1-of-5 from the free throw line. On November 8, he recorded his fifth career triple-double with 16 points, 14 rebounds and 10 assists in a loss to Melbourne United. Jackson played most of January with a toe and Achilles heel injury. He responded to his poor form in the team's first game of February, recording a season-high 31 points, 10 rebounds and six assists in a 106–84 win over the Adelaide 36ers, keeping the Breakers' playoff chances alive. With seven 3-pointers, 10 rebounds and six assists, Jackson became the first NBL player to record such stats since John Rillie did so in 1998. The Breakers finished the regular season in fourth place with a 16–12 record and defeated first-seeded Melbourne United 2–0 in the semi-finals to return to the NBL Grand Final, where they were defeated 2–1 by the Perth Wildcats. Having starred in a series-levelling game two win in Auckland, Jackson had a poor performance in game three against the Wildcats, going scoreless on five attempts and fouling out early in the last term. He appeared in all 33 games for the Breakers in 2015–16, averaging 12.9 points, 6.0 rebounds, 6.4 assists and 1.3 steals per game.

Following the NBL season, Jackson had a six-game stint in Puerto Rico with Atléticos de San Germán. After not being able to match several offers from other NBL clubs, the Breakers were forced to part ways with Jackson during the off-season.

=== Melbourne United (2016) ===
On May 10, 2016, Jackson signed a two-year deal with Melbourne United. He made his debut for United in their season opener on October 7, recording 14 points, 13 rebounds and six assists in a 76–71 loss to the Breakers in Auckland. On November 9, United made the decision to release Jackson for strategic reasons, after they started the season 3–6. In nine games for United, he averaged 10.0 points, 4.9 rebounds, 5.6 assists and 1.4 steals per game. Despite being released so early in the season, Jackson's 5.56 assists per game was the statistical leader for that category at the end of the season.

=== Yakima SunKings (2018) ===
In February 2018, Jackson joined the Yakima SunKings of the NAPB. He led the SunKings to their first championship in 11 years. In 13 games, he averaged 11.8 points, 3.8 rebounds, 5.2 assists and 1.5 steals per game.

=== Illawarra Hawks (2018–2019) ===
On July 5, 2018, Jackson signed with the Illawarra Hawks for the 2018–19 NBL season. In 28 games, he averaged 8.0 points, 3.1 rebounds, 3.8 assists and 1.1 steals per game.

== Career statistics ==
Legend
GP	Games played	GS	Games started	MPG	Minutes per game
FG%	Field goal percentage	3P%	3-point field goal percentage	FT%	Free throw percentage
RPG	Rebounds per game	APG	Assists per game	SPG	Steals per game
BPG	Blocks per game	PPG	Points per game	**Bold**	Career high

=== D-League ===
==== Regular season ====
Year	Team	GP	GS	MPG	FG%	3P%	FT%	RPG	APG	SPG	BPG	PPG
2009–10	Erie	34	24	33.3	.426	.270	**.723**	5.6	7.4	**2.1**	**.4**	**16.4**
2010–11	Erie	14	14	30.3	.395	**.391**	.574	4.1	6.6	**2.1**	**.4**	12.1
2010–11	Idaho	**36**	**36**	**36.1**	**.476**	.293	.641	**6.1**	**7.5**	**2.1**	.1	13.6
Career		84	74	34.0	.440	.303	.672	5.6	7.3	2.1	.3	14.5

=== NBA ===
==== Regular season ====
Year	Team	GP	GS	MPG	FG%	3P%	FT%	RPG	APG	SPG	BPG	PPG
2009–10	Cleveland	**5**	0	2.0	.000	.000	.250	.2	.4	.0	.0	.2
2009–10	San Antonio	3	0	8.3	.286	.000	**.750**	**1.3**	**2.0**	**1.0**	**.7**	2.3
2009–10	Washington	4	0	**9.8**	**.364**	**.333**	**.750**	.8	1.5	.0	.0	**3.0**
Career		12	0	6.2	.300	.167	.583	.7	1.2	.3	.2	1.7
