= Daryl Corletto =

Australian-British basketball player

Personal information
- Born: 24 August 1981 (age 45) Melbourne, Victoria, Australia
- Listed height: 193 cm (6 ft 4 in)
- Listed weight: 88 kg (194 lb)

Career information
- High school: Laverton Secondary College (Melbourne, Victoria)
- Playing career: 2001–2024
- Position: Shooting guard
- Coaching career: 2015–2016

Career history

Playing
- 2001–2002: Werribee Devils
- 2001–2011: Melbourne Tigers
- 2003: Ringwood Hawks
- 2004–2009: Melbourne Tigers (Big V)
- 2010–2011: Ringwood Hawks
- 2011–2014: New Zealand Breakers
- 2014: Super City Rangers
- 2014–2015: Melbourne United
- 2015–2017: Plymouth Raiders
- 2016–2017: Melbourne Tigers (SEABL)
- 2019; 2021–2023: Western Port Steelers
- 2024: Mornington Breakers

Coaching
- 2015–2016: Plymouth Raiders

Career highlights
- 4× NBL champion (2006, 2008, 2012, 2013); 2× Big V champion (2008, 2009); Big V Grand Final MVP (2008); 2× Big V All-Star Five (2003, 2008); ABA Under 23 Player of the Year (2001)

Daryl Corletto (born 24 August 1981) is an Australian-British former professional basketball player.

== Early life and career ==
Corletto was born in Melbourne, Victoria, and grew up in the suburb of Altona Meadows, where he played for the Werribee Devils. He attended Laverton Secondary College. His father influenced him to pursue a basketball career. He joined the Melbourne Tigers junior squad at age 16 and was a member of the Victorian Championship State Team in 1996 and 1998. He was also selected to join the all-Australian youth team in 1998 and 2000.

== Professional career ==
=== Melbourne Tigers (2001–2011) ===
After playing in the Big V Championship Division for the Werribee Devils in 2001 and earning ABA Under 23 Player of the Year honours, Corletto joined the Melbourne Tigers of the National Basketball League (NBL) for the 2001/02 season. Over his first two NBL seasons, Corletto appeared in just 13 games. During this time, he continued on in the Big V during the NBL off-season, playing for Werribee in 2002 and Ringwood in 2003. The 2003 Big V season saw Corletto average a career-best 33.5 points per game and earn Big V All-Star Five honours.

Corletto's third season in the NBL, the 2003/04 campaign, saw him play in 27 games for the Tigers while averaging 2.1 points per game. He became an important cog for Melbourne from the 2004/05 season onwards, as he averaged 7.0 points in 34 games that year before going on to average 11.2 points per game in 2005/06 (an NBL career high for Corletto), 10.4 points per game in 2006/07, and 9.0 points per game in 2007/08. During this three-year run, Corletto appeared in 37 games each season and helped lead the Tigers to three straight NBL Grand Final series, winning championships in 2006 and 2008. The Tigers went on to reach the 2009 Grand Final as well, where they were defeated 3–2 by the South Dragons.

Between 2004 and 2009, Corletto played for the Melbourne Tigers Big V team, where he won back-to-back titles in 2008 and 2009. The 2008 season saw him earn Big V All-Star Five honours and the Golden Hands award, while also being named Grand Final MVP. For his performance at the 2008 Australian Club Championships, he was named in the All-Star Five.

Following the 2008/09 season, the NBL reduced from 10 to eight teams and moved from the 48-minute game to the 40-minute game format. In the first two seasons of the new NBL era, the Tigers missed the playoffs both years. Corletto appeared in all 56 games for the Tigers during this two-year period and averaged 10 points per game. He also returned to the Ringwood Hawks for the 2010 Big V season and continued on with them in 2011.

=== New Zealand Breakers (2011–2014) ===
In September 2011, Corletto signed a one-year deal with the New Zealand Breakers. Corletto moved to the Breakers after the Tigers were forced to cut one player from their roster to make room for NBA guard Patty Mills—Mills signed with Melbourne until the end of the NBA lockout. In his first season with the Breakers, Corletto helped the team win their second consecutive championship. In 33 games in 2011/12, Corletto averaged 9.8 points per game.

On 9 March 2012, with the 2011/12 NBL Finals still in progress, the Breakers confirmed the re-signing of Corletto on a two-year contract. The Breakers collected their third consecutive title in 2012/13, while Corletto remained consistent with 9.6 ppg in 32 games. The following season however saw the Breakers miss the playoffs, while Corletto averaged 7.8 points per game—his lowest mark since he averaged 7.0 ppg in 2008/09.

Following the conclusion of the 2013/14 season, Corletto joined the Super City Rangers for the 2014 New Zealand NBL season. However, in June 2014, he left New Zealand and parted ways with both the Breakers and the Rangers.

=== Melbourne United (2014–2015) ===
On 13 June 2014, Corletto signed with Melbourne United for the 2014/15 NBL season, returning to the revamped club for a second stint. In his lone season for United, Corletto appeared in all 28 games and averaged 6.4 points per game—his lowest mark since the 2003/04 season.

In 397 NBL games over 14 seasons, Corletto averaged 8.3 points while shooting 43.4% from the field, 36.7% from three-point range, and 85.1% from the free throw line.

=== Plymouth Raiders and Melbourne Tigers (2015–2017) ===
On 8 May 2015, Corletto signed with the Plymouth Raiders for the 2015–16 British Basketball League season. After the Raiders went 0–3 to begin the season, the club named Corletto player-coach, replacing the outgoing Jay Marriott.

Following the conclusion of the BBL season, Corletto returned to Australia and joined the Melbourne Tigers for the 2016 SEABL season.

Corletto continued on with the Raiders for the 2016–17 season in a player role.

On 2 March 2017, Corletto re-signed with the Melbourne Tigers for the 2017 SEABL season.

=== Western Port Steelers (2019–2023) ===
On 3 December 2018, Corletto signed with the Western Port Steelers of the Big V Division One for the 2019 season.

In 2021, 2022 and 2023, Corletto played for the Steelers in the Big V Championship Division.

=== Mornington Breakers (2024) ===
In 2024, Corletto played for the Mornington Breakers of the Big V Division Two.

== Personal ==
In 2009, Corletto married Australian netballer Julie Prendergast. That same year, he was named in Great Britain's 24-man preliminary squad for EuroBasket 2009.
