= Andrej Lemanis =

Australian basketball player and coach

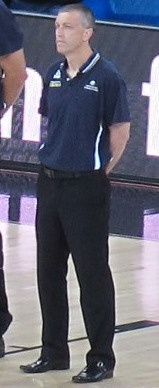
- Lemanis in 2014

Altiri Chiba
- Title: Head coach
- League: B.League

Personal information
- Born: 1969 (age 56–57) Melbourne, Victoria, Australia
- Listed height: 196 cm (6 ft 5 in)

Career information
- Playing career: 1985–1993
- Position: Guard
- Coaching career: 1996–present

Career history

Playing
- 1985; 1991: St. Kilda Saints / Southern Melbourne Saints
- 1992–1993: South East Melbourne Magic

Coaching
- 1996: Geelong Supercats (assistant)
- 1998–2005: Townsville Crocodiles (assistant)
- 2005–2013: New Zealand Breakers
- 2016–2021: Brisbane Bullets
- 2021–present: Altiri Chiba

Career highlights
- As player: NBL champion (1992); As head coach: 2× NBL Coach of the Year (2012, 2013); 3× NBL champion (2011–2013)

Andrej Lemanis (Latvian: Andrejs Lēmanis, born 18 March 1969) is an Australian professional basketball coach and former player. Lemanis served as the head coach of Australia national team from 2013 to 2019. Lemanis coached the New Zealand Breakers of the Australian National Basketball League from 2005 to 2013, taking them to three consecutive championship titles in 2011, 2012 and 2013. He was awarded the NBL Coach of the Year award in 2012 and 2013. Lemanis was the head coach of the Brisbane Bullets of the NBL from 2016 to 2021.

== Playing career ==
Lemanis played for several Victorian clubs in the National Basketball League (NBL). He played for the St. Kilda Saints in 1985 and returned to the team as the renamed Southern Melbourne Saints in 1991. He played for the South East Melbourne Magic in 1992 and 1993, winning an NBL championship with the Magic in 1992.

== Coaching career ==
Lemanis started his coaching career as an assistant with the Geelong Supercats in 1996. After the team folded, he served as general manager of Basketball Victoria for one year. Lemanis was an assistant coach with the Townsville Crocodiles from 1998 to 2005. In 2000, he coached the Townsville Heat to the Queensland Basketball League championship. On 7 March 2005, Lemanis was announced as head coach of the New Zealand Breakers.

On 28 February 2013, Lemanis coached his 250th NBL game. On 12 April 2013, the Breakers recorded their third NBL championship, sweeping the Perth Wildcats 2–0 in the grand final series, thus winning his third title.

Prior to his appointment as the head coach of the Australian men's national basketball team, Lemanis served as an assistant coach of the Australian men's national basketball team.

On 20 October 2015, Lemanis signed with Brisbane Bullets. On 5 May 2021, Lemanis announced that he would be leaving the Bullets at the end of the 2020–21 season.

=== Australia national team ===
On 24 April 2013, he was announced as the new head coach of the Australia national team.

By virtue of winning the 2013 FIBA Oceania Championship, Australia qualified for the 2014 FIBA Basketball World Cup in Spain. Australia was drawn into Group D, alongside Lithuania, Slovenia, Angola, Mexico and South Korea. After suffering an opening round 90–80 loss to Slovenia, Australia bounced back, stringing together three consecutive wins over South Korea, Lithuania and Mexico, the first time in 16 years that Australia had won 3 consecutive matches at the FIBA World Cup. However, in their next match Australia suffered a shock 91–83 loss to Angola, which came despite leading by 15 points in the middle of the third quarter. This result, combined with Lithuania's 67–64 win over Slovenia meant that Australia finished third in their group, qualifying for the knockout stage of the tournament. Australia met Turkey in the knockout stage of the tournament, and lost 65–64 to Turkey, ending their World Cup campaign.

Lemanis led the Boomers to gold in the 2015 Oceania Championships, qualifying the team for Rio 2016.

In Rio, the Boomers, under Coach Lemanis went 4 and 1 in the pool games (losing only to Team USA), finishing second in their group. They played Lithuania in the quarter-final, beating them 80-64 leading Australia in to the medal rounds for the first time since 2000. Australia went on to lose the semi-final game to Serbia and then fell to Spain in the bronze medal game by a single point. This equalled Australia's highest ever finish at an Olympics for Men's Basketball.

In 2017, Lemanis was re-appointed as head coach of Australia, this time on a part time basis as he also coached the Brisbane Bullets in the Australian National Basketball League.

FIBA introduced a new World Cup Qualification system, meaning Australia would now need to qualify through the Asia/Oceania region. In 2017, the Boomers, under Lemanis, played in their first ever Asia Cup tournament. The team went undefeated through the tournament, beating Iran in the final, 79–56, taking home the gold medal for Australia.

Lemanis then led the team through the FIBA qualification system. Australia went 10–2 during the qualification phase, finishing first in their group and taking the number one ranking in to the 2019 FIBA World Cup draw.

In 2019, Lemanis again lead the Boomers at the World Cup in China. The team won all 3 games in the opening round and both games of the second round, meaning they qualified as the number one team from their section. Australia then went on to beat the Czech Republic 82–70 meaning that for the first time in their history Australia had won 6 straight games at a World Cup or Olympics tournament. The team lost in double overtime to eventual champions Spain in the semi-final and lost to France in the bronze medal game, meaning they finished fourth. Once again, equalling Australia's best ever finish at a Men's World Cup.

On 27 November 2019, Brett Brown replaced Lemanis as head coach of Australia national team.

Lemanis is currently the winningest coach in Australian Men's Basketball history, going 35–9 (79.5%) in his tenure as head Coach of the Boomers. In major tournaments (Olympics and World Cup), Lemanis' record is 14–8 (64%).

When Lemanis was appointed as the Australian national coach in 2013, Australia had a FIBA ranking of 11. When he departed in November 2019, he had taken the country to a FIBA World ranking of 3 - its highest ever.

Lemanis was the first coach in the history of Australian basketball to have recorded a victory against the USA at senior level. The Boomers beat USA in a World Cup lead up game in Melbourne on August 25, 2019. The game was played at Marvel Stadium in front of 52,000 fans. The Boomers won the game, 98–94.

== Personal life ==
Lemanis was born in Melbourne to Latvian parents who had immigrated to Australia after the Soviet invasion of Latvia during World War II. He was taught basketball by his father and started playing at the age of six.

Lemanis graduated from the University of Melbourne with a commerce degree in 1990.
