= New Zealand Breakers =

New Zealand professional men's basketball team

- 2026–27 New Zealand Breakers season
- League: NBL
- Founded: 2003; 23 years ago
- History: New Zealand Breakers; 2003–present
- Arena: Spark Arena
- Capacity: 9,740
- Location: Auckland, New Zealand
- Team colours: Black, white, sky blue
- Main sponsor: Bank of New Zealand
- CEO: Troy Georgiu
- Chairman: Marc Mitchell
- General manager: Dillon Boucher (president of basketball operations)
- Head coach: Gordon Herbert
- Team captain: Parker Jackson-Cartwright
- Ownership: Marc Mitchell (majority owner)
- Championships: 4 (2011, 2012, 2013, 2015)
- NBL Ignite Cup titles: 1 (2026)
- Retired numbers: 4 (10, 23, 24, 32)
- Website: NZ Breakers
Home	Away

The New Zealand Breakers (also known as the BNZ Breakers for sponsorship reasons) are a New Zealand professional basketball team based in Auckland. The Breakers are the only non-Australian side currently competing in Australia's National Basketball League (NBL), and one of only two non-Australian sides to have done so (the other being the now-absent Singapore Slingers). They play their home games at multiple venues, mainly Spark Arena in Auckland. In 2011, the Breakers won their first NBL championship and successfully defended it in 2012 and 2013, claiming the second three-peat in NBL history. They won their fourth title in 2015.

From 2005 to 2018, the Breakers were owned by Liz and Paul Blackwell. In 2018, a consortium led by former NBA player Matt Walsh acquired a majority stake through a newly established company, Breakers Basketball Ltd. In March 2025, Kiwi-American businessman and attorney Marc Mitchell acquired the club.

== History ==
=== Early years ===
In March 2003, a New Zealand basketball team was confirmed to be entering the Australian National Basketball League in the 2003–04 season. Three Waikato businessmen, Michael Redman, Dallas Fisher and Keith Ward, were persuaded to start the Breakers franchise.

A driving force behind establishing the Breakers was inaugural coach Jeff Green. Green stepped down as coach two months into the season and was replaced by assistant coach Frank Arsego. The Breakers finished their first season in tenth place with a 12–21 record.

After finishing the 2004–05 season in last place, the Breakers replaced Arsego with Andrej Lemanis for the 2005–06 season. In 2005, Liz and Paul Blackwell took over ownership of the Breakers.

With the addition of Kirk Penney for the 2007–08 season, the Breakers made their first playoff appearance. The Breakers returned to the playoffs in 2008–09 behind Penney and C. J. Bruton. Penney was sidelined for nine games with a back injury in 2009–10, with a mid-season slump leading to the Breakers missing the playoffs.

=== Championship era (2010–2016) ===
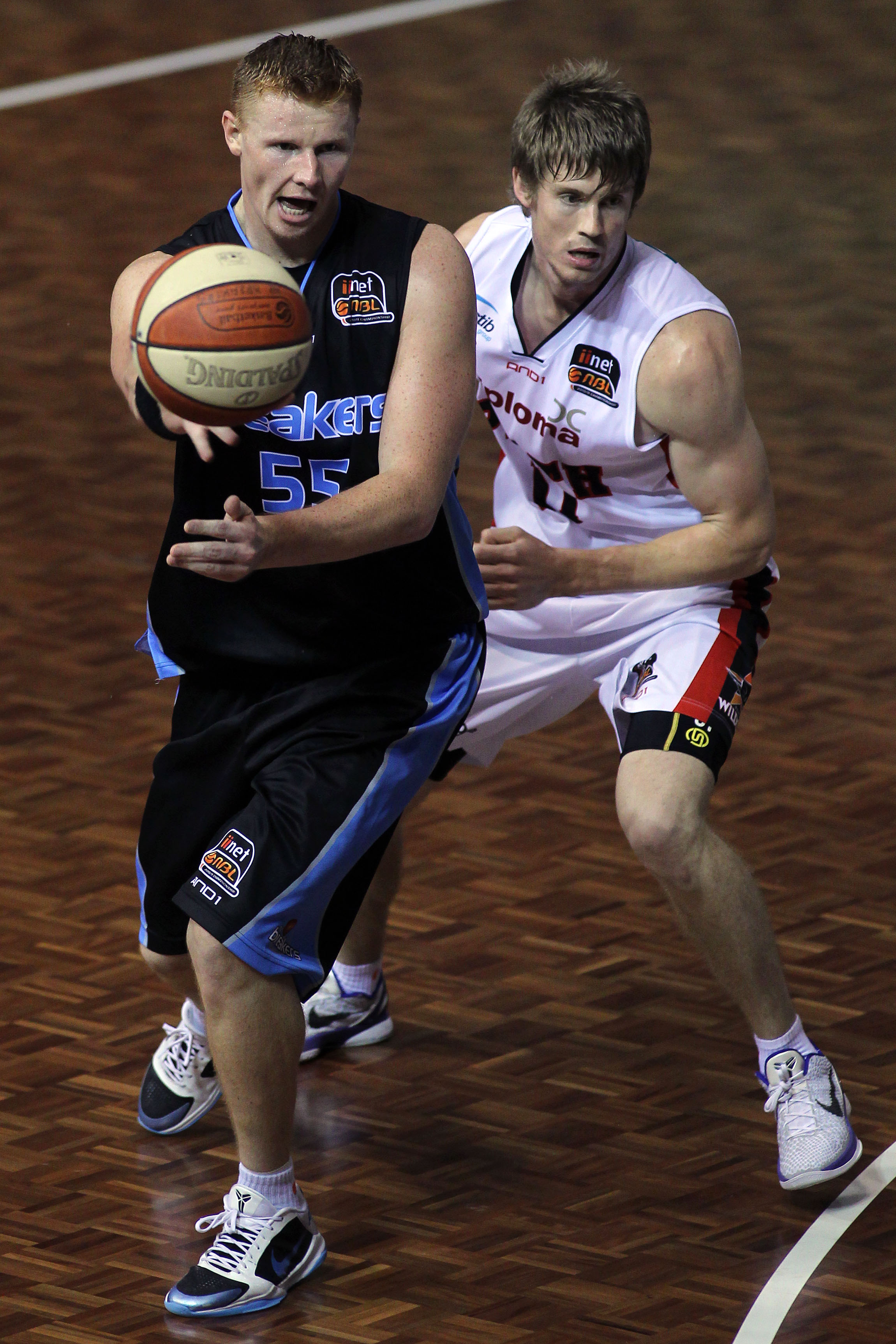
Breakers' Gary Wilkinson makes a pass against Wildcats' Cameron Tovey during the 2011 NBL semi-finals

The 2010–11 season saw the Breakers earn their first minor premiership with a first-place finish and a 22–6 record. They went on to reach their inaugural NBL grand final with a 2–1 semi-final victory over the Perth Wildcats. In the grand final series, the Breakers defeated the Cairns Taipans 2–1 to win their maiden NBL championship. They became the first New Zealand side to win a major Australian championship. The team was led by Penney, Bruton, Mika Vukona, Gary Wilkinson, Paul Henare and grand final MVP Thomas Abercrombie.

The 2011–12 season saw the Breakers claim the minor premiership with a 21–7 record and reach the NBL grand final series, where they defeated the Perth Wildcats 2–1 to win their second championship. The team was led by Wilkinson, Abercrombie, Vukona, Daryl Corletto, Cedric Jackson and grand final MVP C. J. Bruton.

The 2012 off-season saw the departure of Gary Wilkinson and the elevation of Alex Pledger to the starting line-up, while guard Corey Webster returned to the squad after a 12-month suspension for the use of banned substances. The 2012–13 season saw the Breakers win the minor premiership behind a 15-game winning streak. They went on to reach the NBL grand final series, where they defeated the Wildcats 2–0 to win their third straight championship behind grand final MVP Cedric Jackson. The Breakers became just the second team to win a three-peat of championships after the Sydney Kings in 2003, 2004 and 2005.

The 2013 off-season saw the departure of long-time coach Andrej Lemanis.

After missing the playoffs in 2013–14, the Breakers brought back Cedric Jackson for the 2014–15 season. They finished the regular season in second place with a 19–9 record and defeated the Adelaide 36ers 2–0 in the semi-finals to return to the NBL grand final. In the grand final series, the Breakers defeated the Cairns Taipans 86–71 in game one and 83–81 in game two. Ekene Ibekwe hit the game-winning buzzer beater in game two to lift the Breakers to their fourth championship in five seasons. Jackson was named grand final MVP for the second time.

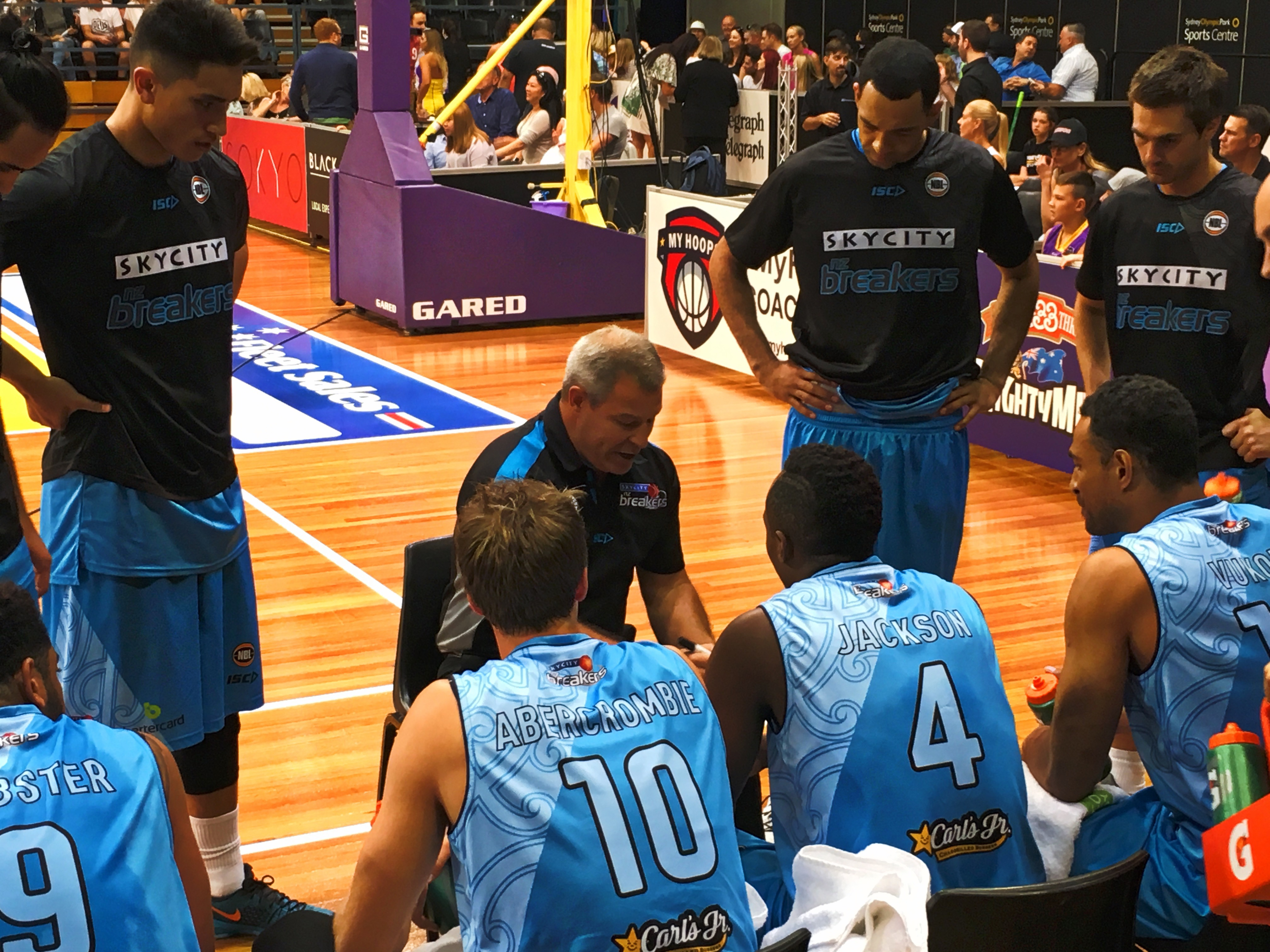
New Zealand Breakers team bench, December 2015

The Breakers returned to the NBL grand final series for the fifth time in six years in 2015–16, where they lost 2–1 to the Perth Wildcats. Following the 2015–16 season, chief executive Richard Clarke and coach Dean Vickerman parted ways with the organisation, with Paul Henare becoming head coach and Dillon Boucher becoming general manager.

=== Post championship era and new ownership (2016–2020) ===
After missing the playoffs in 2016–17, the Breakers had a 9–1 record early in the 2017–18 season, setting their best start in franchise history. They went on to finish the regular season in fourth place with a 15–13 record and lost to Melbourne United in the semi-finals. Kirk Penney retired following the season.

In 2018, a consortium headed by former NBA player Matt Walsh became the majority shareholders via a newly formed company called Breakers Basketball Ltd. Under head coach Kevin Braswell, the Breakers missed the playoffs in 2018–19 with a sixth-place finish and a 12–16 record.

The 2019–20 season saw the appointment of new coach Dan Shamir and the acquisition of R. J. Hampton as part of the NBL Next Stars program. The Breakers subsequently had record home crowds and engagement. Despite winning 11 of their last 14 games to finish the season, the team missed the playoffs on points differential.

=== COVID-affected years (2020–2022) ===
Due to the COVID-19 pandemic, the 2020–21 season start date was delayed until January 2021. As a result of the pandemic, the Breakers were forced to commit to being based in Australia for the majority of the season. They hosted a number of games as the 'home' team in Tasmania and only returned to play their last seven games in New Zealand in late May. A number of players missed large portions of the season due to injury and personal issues, including Robert Loe (20 games), Thomas Abercrombie (9), Corey Webster (8) and Tai Webster (7). The team also had a mid-season import change, with Lamar Patterson being replaced by Levi Randolph. They finished the season in eighth place with a 12–24 record.

As a result of the pandemic, the Breakers played their entire 2021–22 season in Australia, basing themselves in Tasmania. The team faced a COVID outbreak on the eve of the season, which they had to play through en route to a 0–6 start. With a 5–23 record, the Breakers had their worst season in their 19-year history.

=== Return to the grand final (2022–2023) ===
New Zealand Breakers logo (2023–2026)

With the departure of Dan Shamir, assistant coach Mody Maor was elevated to head coach for the 2022–23 season and helped the Breakers become championship contenders. The Breakers finished the regular season in second place with an 18–10 record, as they clinched their first playoff appearance in five years. They went on to reach their first grand final series since 2016. In game one against the Sydney Kings, the Breakers won 95–87. After losing games two and three, the Breakers tied the series with an 80–70 win at home in game four in front of their biggest ever crowd of 9,742. They went on to lose the deciding game five 77–69, as the Kings claimed the championship.

=== 2023–present ===
The Breakers started the 2023–24 season with a 3–7 record. They went on to finish sixth with a 13–15 record and lost in the play-in game.

Thomas Abercrombie retired following the 2023–24 season, ending his NBL career with 429 games and finishing as the Breakers' most-capped player. Head coach Mody Maor parted ways with the Breakers during the off-season to pursue a coaching opportunity in Asia.

The Breakers started the 2024–25 season with a 6–2 record following a 34-point win over Melbourne United on the road. The Breakers entered the FIBA break in second place with a 7–3 record and subsequently signed 7'6" Senegalese import, Tacko Fall. Following the FIBA break, the Breakers suffered six straight losses by an average of 22 points per game. They lost their eighth straight on Christmas day, going down 97–82 to the Tasmania JackJumpers. The Breakers finished the regular season in second-to-last place with a 10–19 record.

BNZ Breakers logo (2026–present)

In March 2025, the club was acquired by Kiwi-American businessman and attorney Marc Mitchell. Mitchell assumed the role of majority owner and formed a partnership with local figures Leon Grice, Stephen Grice, and Sean Colgan, while former owners Paul and Liz Blackwell returned as shareholders. Thomas Abercrombie joined the ownership group as a special advisor. Following a mass front office personnel cleanout, including chief executive Lisa Edser, the club's first appointment under the new ownership was Dillon Boucher to the role of president of basketball operations.

In November 2025, the Breakers announced they would not wear the Pride insignia during the NBL and WNBL Pride Round (21 January–1 February 2026). The club said the decision was made collectively under the league's voluntary participation policy, citing religious and cultural concerns raised by some players and an "all wear it or none wear it" approach to avoid individuals being singled out for their beliefs. The decision attracted criticism, including from former NRL player Ian Roberts.

In the 2025–26 NBL season, the Breakers finished outside the finals spots in seventh at the end of the regular season but won the inaugural NBL Ignite Cup Final, defeating the Adelaide 36ers 111–107 and claimed $300,000 prize money.

== Season by season ==
NBL champions	League champions	Runners-up	Finals berth

Season	Tier	League	Regular season					Post-season	Head coach	Captain	Club MVP
Season	Tier	League	Finish	Played	Wins	Losses	Win %	Post-season	Head coach	Captain	Club MVP
New Zealand Breakers
2003–04	1	NBL	10th	33	12	21	.364	Did not qualify	Jeff Green; Frank Arsego	Pero Cameron	Mike Chappell
2004–05	1	NBL	11th	32	9	23	.281	Did not qualify	Frank Arsego	Pero Cameron; Paul Henare	Aaron Olson
2005–06	1	NBL	9th	32	9	23	.281	Did not qualify	Andrej Lemanis	Paul Henare	Ben Pepper
2006–07	1	NBL	10th	33	11	22	.333	Did not qualify	Andrej Lemanis	Paul Henare	Carlos Powell
2007–08	1	NBL	7th	30	16	14	.533	Won elimination final (Cairns) 100–78; Lost quarterfinal (Brisbane) 89–106	Andrej Lemanis	Paul Henare	Kirk Penney
2008–09	1	NBL	3rd	30	18	12	.600	Won elimination final (Adelaide) 131–101; Lost semifinals (Melbourne) 0–2	Andrej Lemanis	Paul Henare	Kirk Penney
2009–10	1	NBL	5th	28	15	13	.536	Did not qualify	Andrej Lemanis	Paul Henare	Kirk Penney
2010–11	1	NBL	1st	28	22	6	.786	Won semifinals (Perth) 2–1; Won NBL finals (Cairns) 2–1	Andrej Lemanis	Mika Vukona	Kirk Penney
2011–12	1	NBL	1st	28	21	7	.750	Won semifinals (Townsville) 2–1; Won NBL finals (Perth) 2–1	Andrej Lemanis	Mika Vukona	Cedric Jackson
2012–13	1	NBL	1st	28	24	4	.923	Won semifinals (Sydney) 2–0; Won NBL finals (Perth) 2–0	Andrej Lemanis	Mika Vukona	Cedric Jackson
2013–14	1	NBL	7th	28	11	17	.393	Did not qualify	Dean Vickerman	Mika Vukona	Thomas Abercrombie
2014–15	1	NBL	2nd	28	19	9	.679	Won semifinals (Adelaide) 2–0; Won NBL finals (Cairns) 2–0	Dean Vickerman	Mika Vukona	Cedric Jackson
2015–16	1	NBL	4th	28	16	12	.571	Won semifinals (Melbourne) 2–0; Lost NBL finals (Perth) 1–2	Dean Vickerman	Mika Vukona	Corey Webster
2016–17	1	NBL	5th	28	14	14	.500	Did not qualify	Paul Henare	Mika Vukona	Kirk Penney
2017–18	1	NBL	4th	28	15	13	.536	Lost semifinals (Melbourne) 0–2	Paul Henare	Mika Vukona	Édgar Sosa
2018–19	1	NBL	6th	28	12	16	.429	Did not qualify	Kevin Braswell	Thomas Abercrombie	Shawn Long
2019–20	1	NBL	6th	28	15	13	.536	Did not qualify	Dan Shamir	Thomas Abercrombie	Thomas Abercrombie
2020–21	1	NBL	8th	36	12	24	.333	Did not qualify	Dan Shamir	Thomas Abercrombie	Finn Delany
2021–22	1	NBL	10th	28	5	23	.179	Did not qualify	Dan Shamir	Thomas Abercrombie	Yanni Wetzell
2022–23	1	NBL	2nd	28	18	10	.643	Won semifinals (Tasmania) 2–1; Lost NBL finals (Sydney) 2–3	Mody Maor	Thomas Abercrombie	Jarrell Brantley
2023–24	1	NBL	6th	28	13	15	.464	Won play-in qualifier (Sydney) 83–76; Lost play-in game (Illawarra) 85–88	Mody Maor	Thomas Abercrombie	Parker Jackson-Cartwright
2024–25	1	NBL	9th	29	10	19	.345	Did not qualify	Petteri Koponen	Parker Jackson-Cartwright; Mitch McCarron	Parker Jackson-Cartwright
2025–26	1	NBL	7th	33	13	20	.394	Did not qualify	Petteri Koponen	Parker Jackson-Cartwright	Parker Jackson-Cartwright
Regular season record				680	330	350	.485	3 regular season champions			
Finals record				42	26	16	.619	4 NBL championships			

As of the end of the 2025–26 season

Source: New Zealand Breakers Year by Year

== Honour roll ==
NBL Championships:	4 (2011, 2012, 2013, 2015)
Regular Season Champions:	3 (2011, 2012, 2013)
NBL Finals Appearances:	10 (2007, 2008, 2011, 2012, 2013, 2015, 2016, 2018, 2023, 2024)
NBL Grand Final appearances:	6 (2011, 2012, 2013, 2015, 2016, 2023)
NBL Most Valuable Player:	Kirk Penney (2009), Cedric Jackson (2013)
NBL Grand Final MVPs:	Thomas Abercrombie (2011), C. J. Bruton (2012), Cedric Jackson (2013, 2015)
All-NBL First Team:	Carlos Powell (2007), Kirk Penney (2008, 2009, 2010, 2011), C. J. Bruton (2009), Gary Wilkinson (2011), Cedric Jackson (2012, 2013, 2015), Thomas Abercrombie (2012), Anthony Lamb (2024), Parker Jackson-Cartwright (2024)
All-NBL Second Team:	C. J. Bruton (2010), Gary Wilkinson (2012), Mika Vukona (2013, 2014), Ekene Ibekwe (2015), Corey Webster (2016), Édgar Sosa (2018), Shawn Long (2019), Scotty Hopson (2020), Finn Delany (2021), Barry Brown Jr. (2023), Dererk Pardon (2023)
All-NBL Third Team:	Mike Chappell (2004), Thomas Abercrombie (2013)
Leading NBL scorer:	Carlos Powell (2007), Kirk Penney (2009, 2010, 2011)
NBL Best Sixth Man:	Phill Jones (2009), Kevin Braswell (2011), Barry Brown Jr. (2023)
NBL Most Improved Player:	Shea Ili (2018)
NBL Defensive Player of the Year:	Dillon Boucher (2010)
NBL Coach of the Year:	Andrej Lemanis (2012, 2013)
Retired numbers:	#23 C. J. Bruton, #24 Dillon Boucher, #32 Paul Henare
Lifetime members of the club	Andrej Lemanis, Jeff Green, Dillon Boucher, Paul Henare

== Current roster ==
Note: Flags indicate national team eligibility at FIBA-sanctioned events. Players may hold other non-FIBA nationalities not displayed.

New Zealand Breakers roster
Players
Coaches

Pos.	No.	Nat.	Name	Ht.	Wt.
F	0	(New Zealand)	Davison, Carlin	1.97 m (6 ft 6 in)	96 kg (212 lb)
G	1	(Australia)	Le Gassick, Preston	1.85 m (6 ft 1 in)	79 kg (174 lb)
G	2	(New Zealand)	Le'afa, Izayah	1.88 m (6 ft 2 in)	90 kg (198 lb)
F/C	3	(New Zealand)	Mennenga, Sam	2.06 m (6 ft 9 in)	109 kg (240 lb)
G	4	(New Zealand)	Cooper, Tukaha (DP)	1.87 m (6 ft 2 in)
G	5	(New Zealand)	Evans, Kazlo (DP)	1.80 m (5 ft 11 in)
G	6	(United States)	Jackson-Cartwright, Parker (injured) (I & C)	1.80 m (5 ft 11 in)	74 kg (163 lb)
G/F	7	(New Zealand)	Te Rangi, Reuben	1.98 m (6 ft 6 in)	105 kg (231 lb)
C	8	(Canada)	Bediako, Charles (I)	2.11 m (6 ft 11 in)	102 kg (225 lb)
G	9	(New Zealand)	King, Mojave (NRP)	1.96 m (6 ft 5 in)	88 kg (194 lb)
G	11	(Germany)	Weidemann, Nelson (I)	1.91 m (6 ft 3 in)	75 kg (165 lb)
F	12	(South Sudan)	Noi, Kouat	2.01 m (6 ft 7 in)	103 kg (227 lb)
F/C	13	(New Zealand)	Rissetto, Anzac	2.08 m (6 ft 10 in)	116 kg (256 lb)
G	17	(United States)	Mays, Skylar (IRP)	1.91 m (6 ft 3 in)	93 kg (205 lb)
G	18	(New Zealand)	Chunga, Aubrey (DP)	1.96 m (6 ft 5 in)
F	21	(New Zealand)	Robinson, Kael (DP)	2.01 m (6 ft 7 in)	100 kg (220 lb)
F	30	(United States)	James, Josiah-Jordan (injured) (I)	1.98 m (6 ft 6 in)	97 kg (214 lb)
G	34	(Australia)	Vasiljevic, Dejan	1.90 m (6 ft 3 in)	94 kg (207 lb)
G	37	(New Zealand)	Cameron, Tobias (IRP)	1.96 m (6 ft 5 in)

Head coach

- (Canada) Gordon Herbert

Assistant coach(es)

- (New Zealand) Quinn Clinton
- (Germany) Sebastian Gleim
- (New Zealand) Matt Lacey
- (New Zealand) Josiah Maama

Legend

- (C) Team captain
- (DP) Development player
- (I) Import player
- (SRP) Special restricted player
- (NS) Next Star player
- Injured

- Roster
Updated: 14 November 2026

=== Notable past players ===
Note: Flags indicate national team eligibility at FIBA-sanctioned events. Players may hold other non-FIBA nationalities not displayed.

Criteria

To appear in this section a player must have either:

- Set a club record or won an individual award while at the club
- Played at least one official international match for their national team at any time
- Played at least one official NBA match at any time.

- (New Zealand) Thomas Abercrombie
- (United States) Derrick Alston
- (New Zealand) B. J. Anthony
- (New Zealand) Everard Bartlett
- (Australia) Tim Behrendorff
- (France) Hugo Besson
- (New Zealand) Dillon Boucher
- (United States) Kevin Braswell
- (Australia) C. J. Bruton
- (New Zealand) Pero Cameron
- (United States) Mike Chappell
- (United States) Zylan Cheatham
- (United States) Rakeem Christmas
- (Australia) Daryl Corletto
- (New Zealand) Isaac Davidson
- (New Zealand) Finn Delany
- (France) Ousmane Dieng
- (Australia) Oscar Forman
- (New Zealand) Isaac Fotu
- (New Zealand) Casey Frank
- (United States) Freddie Gillespie
- (United States) Orien Greene
- (United States) R. J. Hampton
- (New Zealand) Paul Henare
- (New Zealand) Leon Henry
- (United States) Scotty Hopson
- (Nigeria) Ekene Ibekwe
- (New Zealand) Shea Ili
- (United States) Cedric Jackson
- (New Zealand) Phill Jones
- (New Zealand) Robert Loe
- (United States) Shawn Long
- (Lebanon) Ater Majok
- (Panama) Akil Mitchell
- (New Zealand) Jordan Ngatai
- (New Zealand) Aaron Olson
- (New Zealand) Kirk Penney
- (Australia) Ben Pepper
- (New Zealand) Alex Pledger
- (United States) Carlos Powell
- (Australia) Shawn Redhage
- (United States) Glen Rice Jr.
- (United States) Rick Rickert
- (Australia) Tony Ronaldson
- (France) Rayan Rupert
- (New Zealand) Ethan Rusbatch
- (Dominican Republic) Édgar Sosa
- (United States) David Stockton
- (New Zealand) Lindsay Tait
- (New Zealand) Reuben Te Rangi
- (United States) Wayne Turner
- (New Zealand) Mika Vukona
- (New Zealand) Corey Webster
- (New Zealand) Tai Webster
- (Australia) Jarrad Weeks
- (Guam) Tai Wesley
- (United States) Gary Wilkinson

=== Retired jerseys ===
New Zealand Breakers retired numbers
No.	Nat.	Player	Position	Tenure
10	(New Zealand)	Thomas Abercrombie	SF/SG	2008–2024
23	(Australia)	C. J. Bruton	PG/SG	2008–2014
24	(New Zealand)	Dillon Boucher	SF/PF	2003–2005, 2008–2013
32	(New Zealand)	Paul Henare	PG	2003–2011 (player); 2013–2018 (coach)

In February 2019, former owners Paul and Liz Blackwell were honoured by the Breakers with a banner in the rafters at Spark Arena.

== Arena history ==
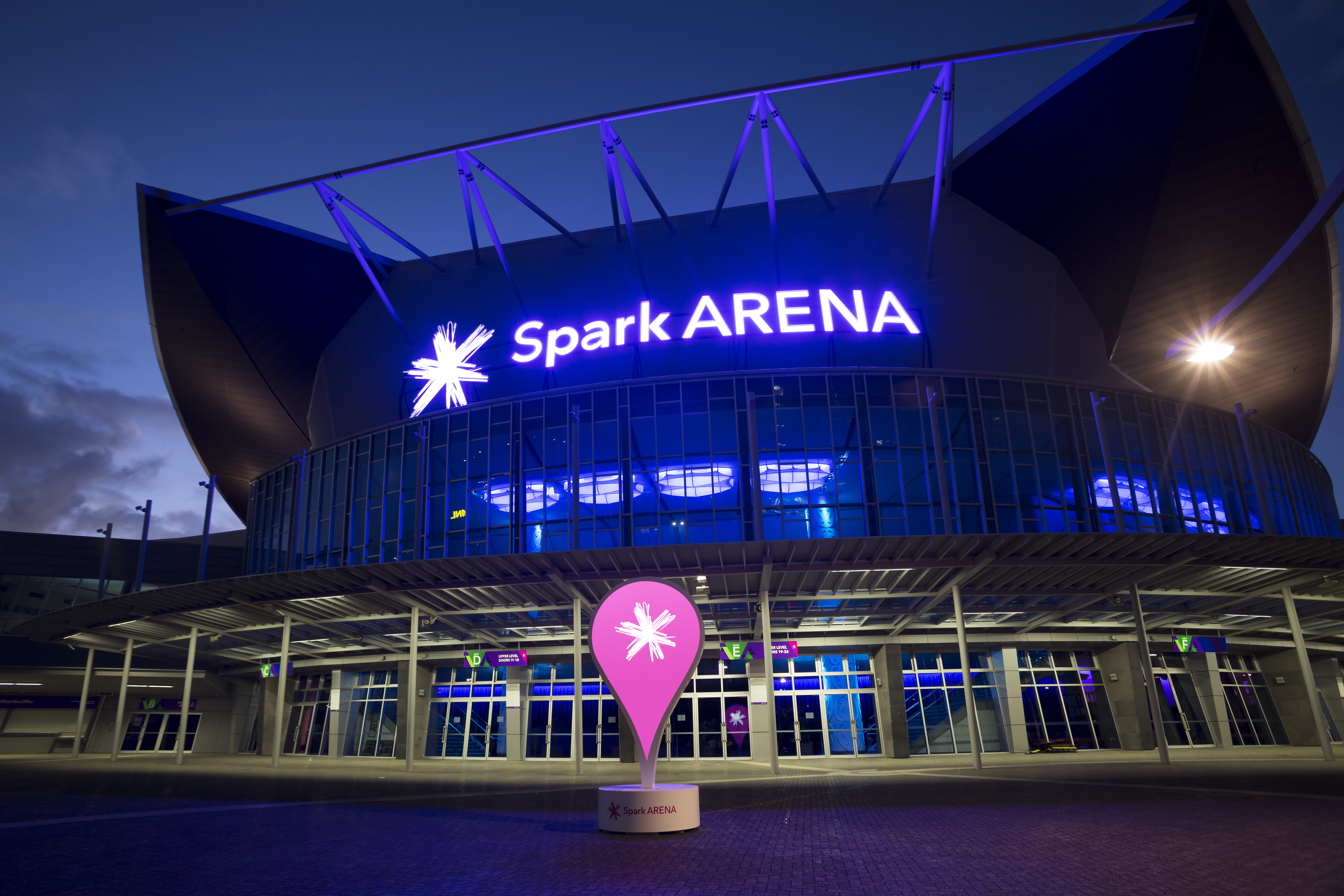
Spark Arena, 2017

- North Shore Events Centre (2003–2018)
- Westpac Centre (2003–2004)
- Queens Wharf Events Centre (2003)
- Mystery Creek Events Centre (2003)
- The Trusts Arena (2004–2006; 2021)
- Spark Arena (2012–present)
