= 2009–10 NBL squads =

== Adelaide 36ers ==
No.		Position	Player
4	(Australia)	SG	Nathan Herbert
6	(United States)	SG	Cortez Groves
8	(Australia)	PG	Darren Ng
9	(Australia)	SF	Brad Hill
11	(Australia)	C	David Cooper
12	(Australia)	PF	Jacob Holmes

No.		Position	Player
15	(Australia)	SF	Chris Molitor
20	(United States)	PG	John Gilchrist
22	(Australia)	C	Matt Burston
32	(Australia)	SF	Tom Garlepp
54	(Australia)	PF	Adam Ballinger (Captain)

== Cairns Taipans ==
No.		Position	Player
1	(Australia)	PG	Kerry Williams
4	(Australia)	SG	Dwayne Vale
5	(Australia)	SG	Michael Chitham (DP)
8	(Australia)	SG	Aaron Grabau
11	(Australia)	C	Ian Crosswhite
12	(New Zealand)	C	Tony Rampton

No.		Position	Player
13	(New Zealand)	SG	Phill Jones (Captain)
20	(Australia)	SF	Gary Boodnikoff
24	(United States)	PG	Julien Mills
34	(United States)	PF	Richard Melzer
45	(Australia)	PF	Dusty Rychart

== Gold Coast Blaze ==
No.		Position	Player
1	(Australia)	PG	Adam Gibson
3	(United States)	SG	Ayinde Ubaka
5	(Australia)	SG	Brendan Teys (DP)
6	(United States)	SF	Erron Maxey
7	(Australia)	SG	Tyson Demos
11	(New Zealand)	PF	Pero Cameron
12	(Australia)	SF	Tom Ammar (DP)
14	(New Zealand)	PF	Mika Vukona

No.		Position	Player
17	(Australia)	PF	Anthony Petrie
21	(Australia)	C	Greg Vanderjagt
33	(Australia)	SG	James Harvey (Captain)
43	(Australia)	SG	Chris Goulding
TBA	(New Zealand)	PF	Craig Bradshaw
TBA	(Australia)	SG	Anthony Olah (DP)
TBA	(Australia)	PG	Isaih Tueta (DP)

== Melbourne Tigers ==
No.		Position	Player
3	(Australia)	PG	Luke Kendall
4	(Australia)	SG	Daryl Corletto
5	(Australia)	SF	Tommy Greer
7	(Australia)	SF	Ryan Bathie (DP)
12	(Australia)	C	Daniel Johnson
13	(Australia)	C	Chris Anstey (Captain)
14	(Australia)	SG	Matt O'Hea
22	(Australia)	PF	Sam Mackinnon
23	(Australia)	PG	Nathan Crosswell
24	(United States)	SF	Julius Hodge

No.		Position	Player
33	(Australia)	PF	Mark Worthington
41	(Australia)	PG	Boden Westover (DP)
45	(Australia)	SF	Edin Zunic (DP)
53	(Australia)	SG	Bennie Lewis (DP)
76	(Australia)	PF	Ben Knight
TBA	(Australia)	SF	Thomas Stephens (DP)
TBA	(Australia)	SG	Robert Stone (DP)
TBA	(Australia)	SF	James Orr (DP)
TBA	(United States)	SG	Mike Rose

== New Zealand Breakers ==
No.		Position	Player
2	(Australia)	PF	Tony Ronaldson
3	(Australia)	PF	Oscar Forman
6	(New Zealand)	SG	Kirk Penney (Captain)
7	(United States)	C	Rick Rickert (I)
9	(New Zealand)	SG	Corey Webster (DP)
10	(New Zealand)	SF	Thomas Abercrombie

No.		Position	Player
11	(United States)	PG	Kevin Braswell (I)
23	(Australia)	PG	C. J. Bruton
24	(New Zealand)	SF	Dillon Boucher
25	(New Zealand)	PF	Jeremiah Trueman
32	(New Zealand)	PG	Paul Henare
35	(New Zealand)	C	Alex Pledger (DP)

== Perth Wildcats ==
No.		Position	Player
3	(Australia)	SF	Stephen Weigh
5	(Australia)	SF	Martin Cattalini
8	(Australia)	SF	Marko Deric (DP)
9	(Australia)	C	Paul Rogers
10	(Australia)	PG	Joel Wagner (DP)
11	(Australia)	C	Sam Harris (DP)
12	(United States)	SG	Kevin Lisch
22	(Australia)	PG	Brad Robbins

No.		Position	Player
24	(Australia)	PF	Jesse Wagstaff
33	(Australia)	SG	Drew Williamson
34	(Canada)	PF	Galen Young
42	(Australia)	PF	Shawn Redhage (Captain)
44	(Australia)	PG	Jarrad Prior (DP)
45	(Australia)	C	Luke Schenscher
53	(Australia)	PG	Damian Martin

== Townsville Crocodiles ==
No.		Position	Player
2	(United States)	PF	Rolan Roberts
3	(Australia)	PG	Chris Cedar
4	(Australia)	PG	Kelvin Robertson
5	(Australia)	PF	Jeff Dowdell
6	(Australia)	SF	Cameron Tovey
8	(United States)	PG	Corey Williams
10	(Australia)	C	Russell Hinder (Captain)

No.		Position	Player
18	(Australia)	SF	Todd Blanchfield (DP)
24	(Australia)	SG	Michael Cedar
33	(Australia)	PF	Stephen Hoare
42	(Australia)	SF	Keegan Tudehope (DP)
43	(Australia)	SG	Brad Williamson
71	(Australia)	SG	Peter Crawford
	(Australia)	SF	Josh Jenkins (DP)

== Wollongong Hawks ==
No.		Position	Player
9	(Australia)	SF	Daniel Jackson
10	(Australia)	PF	Larry Davidson
11	(Australia)	PF	Cameron Tragardh
12	(Australia)	SF	Glen Saville
13	(Australia)	PG	Rhys Martin
14	(United States)	PG	Tywain McKee
22	(Australia)	SG	Tim Coenraad

No.		Position	Player
30	(Australia)	PG	Luke Martin
32	(Australia)	SG	Mat Campbell (Captain)
34	(Australia)	C	Tim Behrendorff
42	(United States)	PF	David Gruber
45	(Australia)	PG	Zac Delaney (DP)
55	(New Zealand)	PF	Gareth Dawson (DP)
