= 2009–10 NBL season =

Professional basketball season

- League: National Basketball League
- Season: 2009–10
- Dates: 24 September 2009 – 12 March 2010
- Teams: 8
- TV partners: Australia: Fox Sports; New Zealand: Māori Television; Online: rivusTV

Regular season
- Season champions: Perth Wildcats
- Season MVP: (United States) Corey Williams (Townsville)

Finals
- Champions: Perth Wildcats (5th title)
- Runners-up: Wollongong Hawks
- Semi-finalists: Townsville Crocodiles; Gold Coast Blaze
- Finals MVP: (United States) Kevin Lisch (Perth)

Statistical leaders
Points	Kirk Penney (New Zealand)	23.2
Rebounds	(United States) Rick Rickert (New Zealand)	7.1
Assists	(Antigua and Barbuda) Julius Hodge (Melbourne)	5.9

NBL seasons
- ← 2008–09 2010–11 →

The 2009–10 NBL season was the 32nd season of competition since its establishment in 1979. A total of eight teams contested the league. The 48-minute game switched to a 40-minute game.

== Preseason ==
Pre-season training began during the last week of July. A pre-season tourney, dubbed the NBL Top End Challenge, involving all eight sides was contested during August in Darwin, Northern Territory.

=== Wollongong Hawks exhibition games ===
10 August	Wollongong Hawks	78–59	St. Mary's Gaels	Illawarra Basketball Stadium, Wollongong
				Attendance: 1,100

14 August	Wollongong Hawks	84–83	Vanderbilt Commodores	Hills Sports Stadium, Sydney
				Attendance: 395

=== Burger King Breakers Pre-season Tour ===
12 August	New Zealand Breakers	90–81	Athletes in Action	Energy Events Centre, Rotorua
				Attendance: 2,200

13 August	New Zealand Breakers	92–86	Athletes in Action	Pettigrew Green Arena, Napier
				Attendance: 1,750

15 August	New Zealand Breakers	??–??	Athletes in Action	Te Rauparaha Arena, Porirua

=== Melbourne Tigers exhibition games ===
14 August	Melbourne Tigers	79–66	St. Mary's Gaels	Caulfield Grammar School, Melbourne

18 September	Melbourne Tigers	96–90	Gold Coast Blaze	Kilsyth Sports Centre, Melbourne

19 September	Melbourne Tigers	79–88	Gold Coast Blaze	King Club, Melbourne

=== Gold Coast Blaze exhibition games ===
17 August	Gold Coast Blaze	82–74	St. Mary's Gaels	Carina Basketball Stadium, Brisbane

18 August	Gold Coast Blaze	85–84	St. Mary's Gaels	The Southport School, Gold Coast

=== 2009 Crocs Pre-season Assault ===
16 August	Townsville Crocodiles	104–99	Vanderbilt Commodores	NPA Stadium, Townsville

28 August	Townsville Crocodiles	81–90	Melbourne Tigers	NPA Stadium, Townsville

29 August	Townsville Crocodiles	79–92	Melbourne Tigers	Mackay Basketball Stadium, Mackay

10 September	Townsville Crocodiles	86–89	Cairns Taipans	NPA Stadium, Townsville

=== 2009 Coca-Cola Pre-season Championship ===
25 August	Perth Wildcats	73–76	Adelaide 36ers	Craigie Leisure Centre, Perth

27 August	Perth Wildcats	79–77	Adelaide 36ers	Waroona Recreation & Aquatic Centre, Waroona

29 August	Perth Wildcats	75–95	Adelaide 36ers	Eaton Recreation Centre, Bunbury

=== Cairns Taipans exhibition games ===
25 August	Cairns Taipans	89–67	Gold Coast Blaze	Bendigo Bank Basketball Centre, Cairns

26 August	Cairns Taipans	84–77	Gold Coast Blaze	Bendigo Bank Basketball Centre, Cairns

31 August	Cairns Taipans	88–83	Melbourne Tigers	Bendigo Bank Basketball Centre, Cairns

1 September	Cairns Taipans	77–87	Melbourne Tigers	Bendigo Bank Basketball Centre, Cairns

12 September	Cairns Taipans	85–92	Townsville Crocodiles	Bendigo Bank Basketball Centre, Cairns

=== NBL Top End Challenge ===
3 September	Cairns Taipans	78–83	Gold Coast Blaze	DBA Stadium, Darwin

3 September	Melbourne Tigers	94–100	Wollongong Hawks	Marrara Indoor Stadium, Darwin

3 September	Adelaide 36ers	75–84	New Zealand Breakers	DBA Stadium, Darwin

3 September	Townsville Crocodiles	85–82	Perth Wildcats	Marrara Indoor Stadium, Darwin

4 September	Adelaide 36ers	78–82	Melbourne Tigers	DBA Stadium, Darwin

4 September	Gold Coast Blaze	90–107	Wollongong Hawks	Marrara Indoor Stadium, Darwin

4 September	Cairns Taipans	88–77	Perth Wildcats	DBA Stadium, Darwin

4 September	New Zealand Breakers	102–91	Townsville Crocodiles	Marrara Indoor Stadium, Darwin

5 September	Adelaide 36ers	72–82	Cairns Taipans	DBA Stadium, Darwin

5 September	Perth Wildcats	79–84	Melbourne Tigers	Marrara Indoor Stadium, Darwin

5 September	Gold Coast Blaze	85–84	Townsville Crocodiles	DBA Stadium, Darwin

5 September	Wollongong Hawks	94–88	New Zealand Breakers	Marrara Indoor Stadium, Darwin

Wollongong Hawks win Top End Challenge.

=== Hood Sweeney Pre-season Challenge ===
11 September	Adelaide 36ers	93–96	Wollongong Hawks	Whyalla Basketball Stadium, Whyalla

13 September	Adelaide 36ers	92–78	Wollongong Hawks	Adelaide Arena, Adelaide

== Regular season ==
The 2009–10 regular season took place over 20 rounds between 24 September 2009 and 14 February 2010.

=== Round 1 ===
Date	Home	Score	Away	Venue	Crowd	Boxscore
24/09/2009	New Zealand Breakers	95–75	Cairns Taipans	North Shore Events Centre	2,428	boxscore
25/09/2009	Wollongong Hawks	94–92	Perth Wildcats	WIN Entertainment Centre	3,556	boxscore
25/09/2009	Gold Coast Blaze	79–82	Townsville Crocodiles	Gold Coast Convention Centre	2,562	boxscore
26/09/2009	Cairns Taipans	86–75	Adelaide 36ers	Cairns Convention Centre	3,830	boxscore

=== Round 2 ===
Date	Home	Score	Away	Venue	Crowd	Boxscore
30/09/2009	Melbourne Tigers	86–81	New Zealand Breakers	State Netball and Hockey Centre	2,857	boxscore
2/10/2009	Gold Coast Blaze	84–78	Wollongong Hawks	Gold Coast Convention Centre	1,943	boxscore
2/10/2009	Townsville Crocodiles	89–91	Perth Wildcats	Townsville Entertainment Centre	4,276	boxscore
3/10/2009	Adelaide 36ers	80–76	New Zealand Breakers	Adelaide Arena	4,671	boxscore
3/10/2009	Cairns Taipans	89–71	Perth Wildcats	Cairns Convention Centre	3,114	boxscore

=== Round 3 ===
Date	Home	Score	Away	Venue	Crowd	Boxscore
7/10/2009	Cairns Taipans	83–66	Gold Coast Blaze	Cairns Convention Centre	2,575	boxscore
8/10/2009	New Zealand Breakers	79–74	Melbourne Tigers	North Shore Events Centre	3,437	boxscore
9/10/2009	Adelaide 36ers	90–89	Townsville Crocodiles	Adelaide Arena	4,759	boxscore
9/10/2009	Perth Wildcats	89–84	Gold Coast Blaze	Challenge Stadium	4,400	boxscore
10/10/2009	Melbourne Tigers	68–103	Townsville Crocodiles	State Netball and Hockey Centre	2,762	boxscore
10/10/2009	Wollongong Hawks	71–59	Cairns Taipans	WIN Entertainment Centre	3,316	boxscore

=== Round 4 ===
Date	Home	Score	Away	Venue	Crowd	Boxscore
14/10/2009	Gold Coast Blaze	98–86	Melbourne Tigers	Gold Coast Convention Centre	2,823	boxscore
16/10/2009	Townsville Crocodiles	101–91	Gold Coast Blaze	Townsville Entertainment Centre	3,963	boxscore
17/10/2009	Wollongong Hawks	76–65	New Zealand Breakers	WIN Entertainment Centre	3,696	boxscore
17/10/2009	Perth Wildcats	110–80	Adelaide 36ers	Challenge Stadium	4,100	boxscore

=== Round 5 ===
Date	Home	Score	Away	Venue	Crowd	Boxscore
21/10/2009	Adelaide 36ers	70–81	Melbourne Tigers	Adelaide Arena	3,919	boxscore
22/10/2009	New Zealand Breakers	92–82	Townsville Crocodiles	North Shore Events Centre	2,271	boxscore
23/10/2009	Gold Coast Blaze	80–63	Cairns Taipans	Gold Coast Convention Centre	2,336	boxscore
24/10/2009	Wollongong Hawks	99–77	Townsville Crocodiles	WIN Entertainment Centre	3,546	boxscore
24/10/2009	Cairns Taipans	69–106	Adelaide 36ers	Cairns Convention Centre	3,043	boxscore
25/10/2009	Perth Wildcats	93–90	Melbourne Tigers	Challenge Stadium	4,100	boxscore

=== Round 6 ===
Date	Home	Score	Away	Venue	Crowd	Boxscore
28/10/2009	Wollongong Hawks	77–67	Cairns Taipans	WIN Entertainment Centre	2,936	boxscore
28/10/2009	Melbourne Tigers	94–88	Gold Coast Blaze	State Netball and Hockey Centre	2,317	boxscore
29/10/2009	New Zealand Breakers	99–91	Adelaide 36ers	North Shore Events Centre	1,912	boxscore
30/10/2009	Townsville Crocodiles	94–87	Melbourne Tigers	Townsville Entertainment Centre	3,879	boxscore
31/10/2009	Adelaide 36ers	87–81	Cairns Taipans	Adelaide Arena	5,511	boxscore
31/10/2009	Perth Wildcats	87–80	Wollongong Hawks	Challenge Stadium	4,250	boxscore

=== Round 7 ===
Date	Home	Score	Away	Venue	Crowd	Boxscore
4/11/2009	Wollongong Hawks	92–80	Melbourne Tigers	WIN Entertainment Centre	2,876	boxscore
5/11/2009	New Zealand Breakers	96–110	Gold Coast Blaze	North Shore Events Centre	2,262	boxscore
6/11/2009	Cairns Taipans	89–78	Wollongong Hawks	Cairns Convention Centre	4,324	boxscore
7/11/2009	Townsville Crocodiles	69–93	Wollongong Hawks	Townsville Entertainment Centre	3,815	boxscore
7/11/2009	Adelaide 36ers	80–77	Gold Coast Blaze	Adelaide Arena	4,883	boxscore
8/11/2009	Perth Wildcats	94–74	New Zealand Breakers	Challenge Stadium	4,000	boxscore

=== Round 8 ===
Date	Home	Score	Away	Venue	Crowd	Boxscore
11/11/2009	Cairns Taipans	70–85	Townsville Crocodiles	Cairns Convention Centre	3,420	boxscore
12/11/2009	New Zealand Breakers	83–74	Perth Wildcats	North Shore Events Centre	2,106	boxscore
13/11/2009	Gold Coast Blaze	93–77	Townsville Crocodiles	Gold Coast Convention Centre	3,308	boxscore
14/11/2009	Adelaide 36ers	83–76	Wollongong Hawks	Adelaide Arena	4,832	boxscore
14/11/2009	Perth Wildcats	79–64	Cairns Taipans	Challenge Stadium	4,200	boxscore
14/11/2009	Melbourne Tigers	91–98	Townsville Crocodiles	State Netball and Hockey Centre	2,804	boxscore

=== Round 9 ===
Date	Home	Score	Away	Venue	Crowd	Boxscore
18/11/2009	Cairns Taipans	77–64	New Zealand Breakers	Cairns Convention Centre	2,673	boxscore
20/11/2009	Townsville Crocodiles	73–85	New Zealand Breakers	Townsville Entertainment Centre	3,778	boxscore
21/11/2009	Melbourne Tigers	83–86	Cairns Taipans	State Netball and Hockey Centre	3,187	boxscore
21/11/2009	Gold Coast Blaze	84–79	Perth Wildcats	Gold Coast Convention Centre	2,598	boxscore

=== Round 10 ===
Date	Home	Score	Away	Venue	Crowd	Boxscore
25/11/2009	Wollongong Hawks	59–82	Adelaide 36ers	WIN Entertainment Centre	2,945	boxscore
26/11/2009	New Zealand Breakers	94–77	Cairns Taipans	North Shore Events Centre	2,750	boxscore
27/11/2009	Townsville Crocodiles	100–88	Adelaide 36ers	Townsville Entertainment Centre	3,433	boxscore
28/11/2009	Perth Wildcats	78–82	Gold Coast Blaze	Challenge Stadium	4,200	boxscore

=== Round 11 ===
Date	Home	Score	Away	Venue	Crowd	Boxscore
2/12/2009	Townsville Crocodiles	73–64	Cairns Taipans	Townsville Entertainment Centre	3,543	boxscore
3/12/2009	New Zealand Breakers	91–93	Wollongong Hawks	North Shore Events Centre	1,896	boxscore
4/12/2009	Gold Coast Blaze	69–68	Cairns Taipans	Gold Coast Convention Centre	2,579	boxscore
5/12/2009	Perth Wildcats	94–89	Townsville Crocodiles	Challenge Stadium	4,400	boxscore
5/12/2009	Adelaide 36ers	84–87	Melbourne Tigers	Adelaide Arena	5,894	boxscore

=== Round 12 ===
Date	Home	Score	Away	Venue	Crowd	Boxscore
9/12/2009	Gold Coast Blaze	80–72	Adelaide 36ers	Gold Coast Convention Centre	2,930	boxscore
10/12/2009	New Zealand Breakers	100–106	Perth Wildcats	North Shore Events Centre	2,163	boxscore
11/12/2009	Cairns Taipans	89–74	Melbourne Tigers	Cairns Convention Centre	3,105	boxscore
12/12/2009	Wollongong Hawks	109–84	Perth Wildcats	WIN Entertainment Centre	3,567	boxscore
12/12/2009	Adelaide 36ers	85–92	New Zealand Breakers	Adelaide Arena	4,589	boxscore
12/12/2009	Townsville Crocodiles	89–79	Melbourne Tigers	Townsville Entertainment Centre	3,813	boxscore

=== Round 13 ===
Date	Home	Score	Away	Venue	Crowd	Boxscore
16/12/2009	Adelaide 36ers	91–81	Gold Coast Blaze	Adelaide Arena	4,260	boxscore
17/12/2009	New Zealand Breakers	80–87	Townsville Crocodiles	North Shore Events Centre	2,343	boxscore
18/12/2009	Cairns Taipans	71–70	Wollongong Hawks	Cairns Convention Centre	3,100	boxscore
19/12/2009	Melbourne Tigers	68–77	New Zealand Breakers	State Netball and Hockey Centre	3,351	boxscore
19/12/2009	Perth Wildcats	70–82	Adelaide 36ers	Challenge Stadium	4,200	boxscore
20/12/2009	Gold Coast Blaze	88–84	Wollongong Hawks	Gold Coast Convention Centre	3,539	boxscore

=== Round 14 ===
Date	Home	Score	Away	Venue	Crowd	Boxscore
23/12/2009	Adelaide 36ers	73–94	Perth Wildcats	Adelaide Arena	4,846	boxscore
26/12/2009	Melbourne Tigers	90–88	Wollongong Hawks	State Netball and Hockey Centre	2,439	boxscore
31/12/2009	Townsville Crocodiles	83–74	Perth Wildcats	Townsville Entertainment Centre	4,684	boxscore
31/12/2009	Gold Coast Blaze	90–83	New Zealand Breakers	Gold Coast Convention Centre	3,872	boxscore
31/12/2009	Cairns Taipans	76–69	Melbourne Tigers	Cairns Convention Centre	4,369	boxscore
31/12/2009	Wollongong Hawks	93–88	Adelaide 36ers	WIN Entertainment Centre	4,088	boxscore
2/01/2010	Melbourne Tigers	87–64	Cairns Taipans	State Netball and Hockey Centre	2,857	boxscore
2/01/2010	Perth Wildcats	91–57	Wollongong Hawks	Challenge Stadium	4,168	boxscore

=== Round 15 ===
Date	Home	Score	Away	Venue	Crowd	Boxscore
6/01/2010	Wollongong Hawks	83–78	New Zealand Breakers	WIN Entertainment Centre	3,353	boxscore
8/01/2010	Perth Wildcats	76–72	New Zealand Breakers	Challenge Stadium	4,400	boxscore
8/01/2010	Townsville Crocodiles	100–89	Gold Coast Blaze	Townsville Entertainment Centre	4,072	boxscore
8/01/2010	Melbourne Tigers	84–65	Wollongong Hawks	State Netball and Hockey Centre	2,823	boxscore
9/01/2010	Cairns Taipans	66–79	Gold Coast Blaze	Cairns Convention Centre	3,851	boxscore
10/01/2010	Adelaide 36ers	72–84	Perth Wildcats	Adelaide Arena	5,627	boxscore

=== Round 16 ===
Date	Home	Score	Away	Venue	Crowd	Boxscore
13/01/2010	Adelaide 36ers	91–77	Cairns Taipans	Adelaide Arena	5,510	boxscore
14/01/2010	New Zealand Breakers	89–94	Melbourne Tigers	North Shore Events Centre	2,600	boxscore
15/01/2010	Gold Coast Blaze	104–89	Adelaide 36ers	Gold Coast Convention Centre	3,674	boxscore
16/01/2010	Perth Wildcats	86–61	Cairns Taipans	Challenge Stadium	4,400	boxscore
16/01/2010	Wollongong Hawks	96–75	Gold Coast Blaze	WIN Entertainment Centre	3,402	boxscore
16/01/2010	Melbourne Tigers	89–87	Adelaide 36ers	State Netball and Hockey Centre	3,262	boxscore

=== Round 17 ===
Date	Home	Score	Away	Venue	Crowd	Boxscore
20/01/2010	Wollongong Hawks	93–86	Townsville Crocodiles	WIN Entertainment Centre	3,077	boxscore
20/01/2010	Melbourne Tigers	100–86	Perth Wildcats	State Netball and Hockey Centre	2,943	boxscore
21/01/2010	New Zealand Breakers	103–89	Adelaide 36ers	North Shore Events Centre	2,358	boxscore
22/01/2010	Townsville Crocodiles	73–59	Wollongong Hawks	Townsville Entertainment Centre	4,067	boxscore
23/01/2010	Cairns Taipans	87–81	Townsville Crocodiles	Cairns Convention Centre	4,123	boxscore
23/01/2010	Gold Coast Blaze	81–95	New Zealand Breakers	Gold Coast Convention Centre	3,751	boxscore
23/01/2010	Perth Wildcats	94–78	Melbourne Tigers	Challenge Stadium	4,400	boxscore

=== Round 18 ===
Date	Home	Score	Away	Venue	Crowd	Boxscore
27/01/2010	Melbourne Tigers	95–85	Adelaide 36ers	State Netball and Hockey Centre	2,899	boxscore
27/01/2010	Townsville Crocodiles	86–91	New Zealand Breakers	Townsville Entertainment Centre	3,480	boxscore
30/01/2010	Adelaide 36ers	87–88	Townsville Crocodiles	Adelaide Arena	6,991	boxscore
30/01/2010	Gold Coast Blaze	99–91	Melbourne Tigers	Gold Coast Convention Centre	4,020	boxscore

=== Round 19 ===
Date	Home	Score	Away	Venue	Crowd	Boxscore
3/02/2010	Cairns Taipans	79–76	Perth Wildcats	Cairns Convention Centre	3,942	boxscore
4/02/2010	New Zealand Breakers	88–60	Wollongong Hawks	North Shore Events Centre	1,984	boxscore
5/02/2010	Gold Coast Blaze	86–73	Perth Wildcats	Gold Coast Convention Centre	4,588	boxscore
6/02/2010	Melbourne Tigers	78–84	Perth Wildcats	State Netball and Hockey Centre	3,368	boxscore
6/02/2010	Wollongong Hawks	100–88	Gold Coast Blaze	WIN Entertainment Centre	3,620	boxscore
6/02/2010	Townsville Crocodiles	89–76	Cairns Taipans	Townsville Entertainment Centre	4,313	boxscore

=== Round 20 ===
Date	Home	Score	Away	Venue	Crowd	Boxscore
10/02/2010	Townsville Crocodiles	102–87	Adelaide 36ers	Townsville Entertainment Centre	3,443	boxscore
11/02/2010	New Zealand Breakers	109–94	Gold Coast Blaze	North Shore Events Centre	2,835	boxscore
12/02/2010	Wollongong Hawks	94–82	Melbourne Tigers	WIN Entertainment Centre	4,268	boxscore
13/02/2010	Adelaide 36ers	79–82	Wollongong Hawks	Adelaide Arena	5,973	boxscore
13/02/2010	Cairns Taipans	79–84	New Zealand Breakers	Cairns Convention Centre	4,747	boxscore
13/02/2010	Melbourne Tigers	73–91	Gold Coast Blaze	State Netball and Hockey Centre	3,500	boxscore
14/02/2010	Perth Wildcats	92–73	Townsville Crocodiles	Challenge Stadium	4,423	boxscore

== Ladder ==
Pos	2009–10 NBL season											
Pos	Team	Pld	W	L	PCT	Last 5	Streak	Home	Away	PF	PA	PP
1	Perth Wildcats	28	17	11	60.71%	3–2	W2	12–2	5–9	2401	2285	105.08%
2	Wollongong Hawks^{1}	28	16	12	57.14%	3–2	W3	13–1	3–11	2299	2270	101.28%
3	Townsville Crocodiles^{1}	28	16	12	57.14%	3–2	L1	10–4	6–8	2418	2369	102.07%
4	Gold Coast Blaze^{1}	28	16	12	57.14%	3–2	W1	12–2	4–10	2410	2376	101.43%
5	New Zealand Breakers	28	15	13	53.57%	5–0	W6	9–5	6–8	2415	2340	103.21%
6	Melbourne Tigers^{2}	28	11	17	39.29%	1–4	L4	8–6	3–11	2338	2423	96.49%
7	Cairns Taipans^{2}	28	11	17	39.29%	2–3	L2	10–4	1–13	2092	2239	93.43%
8	Adelaide 36ers	28	10	18	35.71%	0–5	L7	7–7	3–11	2353	2424	97.07%

Updated to match(es) played on 14 February 2010. Source: NBL.com.au

The NBL tie-breaker system as outlined in the NBL Rules and Regulations states that in the case of an identical win–loss record, the results in games played between the teams will determine order of seeding.

^{1}3-way Head-to-Head between Wollongong Hawks (5-3), Townsville Crocodiles (4-4) and Gold Coast Blaze (3-5).

^{1}Cairns Taipans won Head-to-Head (3-1).

== Finals ==
The season finals were played between 18 February 2010 and 12 March 2010, consisting of two best-of-three semi-finals and final series in which the higher seed hosts the first and deciding third game. Following their performance in the main season, seedings for the finals were as follows:

1. Perth Wildcats
2. Wollongong Hawks
3. Townsville Crocodiles
4. Gold Coast Blaze

=== Playoff bracket ===
Semifinals
1	Perth Wildcats	81	82	X
4	Gold Coast Blaze	68	78	X
2	Wollongong Hawks	87	53	88
3	Townsville Crocodiles	68	82	76

Grand Final
1	Perth Wildcats	75	63	96
2	Wollongong Hawks	64	75	72

=== Semi-finals ===
Date	Home	Score	Away	Venue	Crowd	Boxscore
18/02/2010	Perth Wildcats	81–68	Gold Coast Blaze	Challenge Stadium	4,400	boxscore
19/02/2010	Wollongong Hawks	87–68	Townsville Crocodiles	WIN Entertainment Centre	4,451	boxscore
23/02/2010	Gold Coast Blaze	78–82	Perth Wildcats	Gold Coast Convention Centre	3,699	boxscore
24/02/2010	Townsville Crocodiles	82–53	Wollongong Hawks	Townsville Entertainment Centre	3,499	boxscore
27/02/2010	Wollongong Hawks	88–76	Townsville Crocodiles	WIN Entertainment Centre	4,451	boxscore

=== Grand Final ===
Date	Home	Score	Away	Venue	Crowd	Boxscore
5/03/2010	Perth Wildcats	75–64	Wollongong Hawks	Challenge Stadium	4,600	boxscore
9/03/2010	Wollongong Hawks	75–63	Perth Wildcats	WIN Entertainment Centre	5,786	boxscore
12/03/2010	Perth Wildcats	96–72	Wollongong Hawks	Challenge Stadium	4,700	boxscore

== Season awards ==
- Most Valuable Player: Corey Williams, Townsville Crocodiles
- Rookie of the Year: Jesse Wagstaff, Perth Wildcats
- Best Defensive Player: Dillon Boucher, New Zealand Breakers
- Best Sixth Man: Erron Maxey, Gold Coast Blaze
- Most Improved Player: Anthony Petrie, Gold Coast Blaze
- Coach of the Year: Gordie McLeod, Wollongong Hawks
- Finals MVP: Kevin Lisch, Perth Wildcats
- All-NBL First Team:
  - Corey Williams – Townsville Crocodiles
  - Kirk Penney – New Zealand Breakers
  - Tywain McKee – Wollongong Hawks
  - Mark Worthington – Melbourne Tigers
  - Shawn Redhage – Perth Wildcats
- All-NBL Second Team:
  - Adam Ballinger – Adelaide 36ers
  - C. J. Bruton – New Zealand Breakers
  - Anthony Petrie – Gold Coast Blaze
  - Adam Gibson – Gold Coast Blaze
  - Ayinde Ubaka – Gold Coast Blaze
- All-NBL Third Team:
  - Julius Hodge – Melbourne Tigers
  - Glen Saville – Wollongong Hawks
  - John Gilchrist – Adelaide 36ers
  - Cameron Tragardh – Wollongong Hawks
  - Larry Davidson – Wollongong Hawks

== See also ==
- 2009–10 NBL squads
