= Larry Davidson (basketball) =

Australian basketball player

Personal information
- Born: 19 January 1983 (age 43) Gosford, New South Wales
- Listed height: 208 cm (6 ft 10 in)
- Listed weight: 105 kg (231 lb)

Career information
- Playing career: 2004–2016
- Position: Center / power forward

Career history
- 2004–2006: Hunter Pirates
- 2006–2007: Singapore Slingers
- 2007–2016: Wollongong / Illawarra Hawks

Career highlights
- All-NBL Third Team (2010)

Larry Davidson (born 19 January 1983) is an Australian former professional basketball player who played 12 seasons in the National Basketball League (NBL).

== Junior career ==
A scholarship-holder at the Australian Institute of Sport in 2001 and 2002, Davidson led New South Wales to a national title at the 2002 U20 Australian Junior Championships with an MVP performance, earning the Bob Staunton Medal.

Following the U20 tournament, Davidson moved to the United States to play college basketball for Boise State. However, he was forced to redshirt the 2002–03 season after having surgery on both knees. He returned to practice in the fall of 2003 but suffered further knee injuries that prevented him playing in 2003–04, and in November 2003, he departed Boise State.

== Professional career ==
=== Early years (2004–2007) ===
In 2004, after recovering from his rash of knee injuries, Davidson was recruited by Adrian Hurley to turn pro and join the Hunter Pirates of the National Basketball League. He played two seasons for the Pirates before the club moved to Singapore in 2006 to become the Singapore Slingers. Davidson joined the Slingers for the 2006–07 season.

=== Wollongong / Illawarra Hawks (2007–2016) ===
Davidson joined the Wollongong Hawks for the 2007–08 NBL season and produced career-best numbers, as he averaged 10.5 points and 7.2 rebounds per game. However, the Hawks were on the brink of capitulation after his first season with the club, and despite being saved, Davidson's second season was plagued by injury. While the Hawks survived a couple of near-misses and Davidson dealt with a string of knee problems and other injury setbacks, he became a cornerstone for the Wollongong Hawks.

Davidson led the Hawks in rebounding in 2009–10 (6.8), 2010–11 (8.0, career high) and 2012–13 (6.6). He knocked down 32 three-pointers at 45.1% in 32 games during the 2009–10 season. He later recorded five double-doubles during the 2012–13 season, including a 20-point, 15-rebound performance in a win over the Adelaide 36ers on 23 March 2013. He also earned All-NBL Third Team in 2009–10, Hawks club MVP in 2009–10, and Hawks Most Improved Player in 2007–08.

On 23 January 2014, Davidson played his 250th NBL game. Exactly a year later, he became the sixth Hawks player to notch 200 games for the club, joining Glen Saville, Mat Campbell, Chuck Harmison, Gordie McLeod and Melvin Thomas.

Davidson's final NBL season came in 2015–16 with the renamed Illawarra Hawks.

== Personal ==
Davidson comes from a family with a strong sporting history. His great grandfather Herb Gilbert was a dual international, playing both Rugby League and Rugby Union for Australia. His grandfather Jack Gilbert was in the first St George team to win a premiership. His grandmother is Ray Lindwall's cousin, and his cousin Sam Gilbert plays in the Australian Football League with St Kilda.
