= 2006–07 NBL season =

Professional basketball season

- Logo of the league sponsored by Philips
- League: National Basketball League
- Season: 2006–07
- Dates: 20 September 2006 – 9 March 2007
- Teams: 12
- TV partners: Australia: Fox Sports; New Zealand: Sky Sport

Regular season
- Season champions: Brisbane Bullets
- Season MVP: (Australia) Sam Mackinnon (Brisbane)

Finals
- Champions: Brisbane Bullets (3rd title)
- Runners-up: Melbourne Tigers
- Semi-finalists: Sydney Kings; Cairns Taipans
- Finals MVP: (Australia) Sam Mackinnon (Brisbane)

Statistical leaders
Points	(United States) Carlos Powell (New Zealand)	28.2
Rebounds	(United States) Rosell Ellis (South)	11.4
Assists	(Australia) Brett Maher (Adelaide)	6.6

NBL seasons
- ← 2005–06 2007–08 →

The 2006–07 NBL season was the 29th season of competition since its establishment in 1979. For the first time, a team was established from outside the Australasian area, with the Singapore Slingers taking over the licence of the Hunter Pirates. A new franchise, the South Dragons, was established in Melbourne, taking the number of teams to twelve.

The Brisbane Bullets established a new NBL record of 21 straight wins, including 18 in the regular season.

== 2006–07 league participants ==
=== Stadiums and locations ===
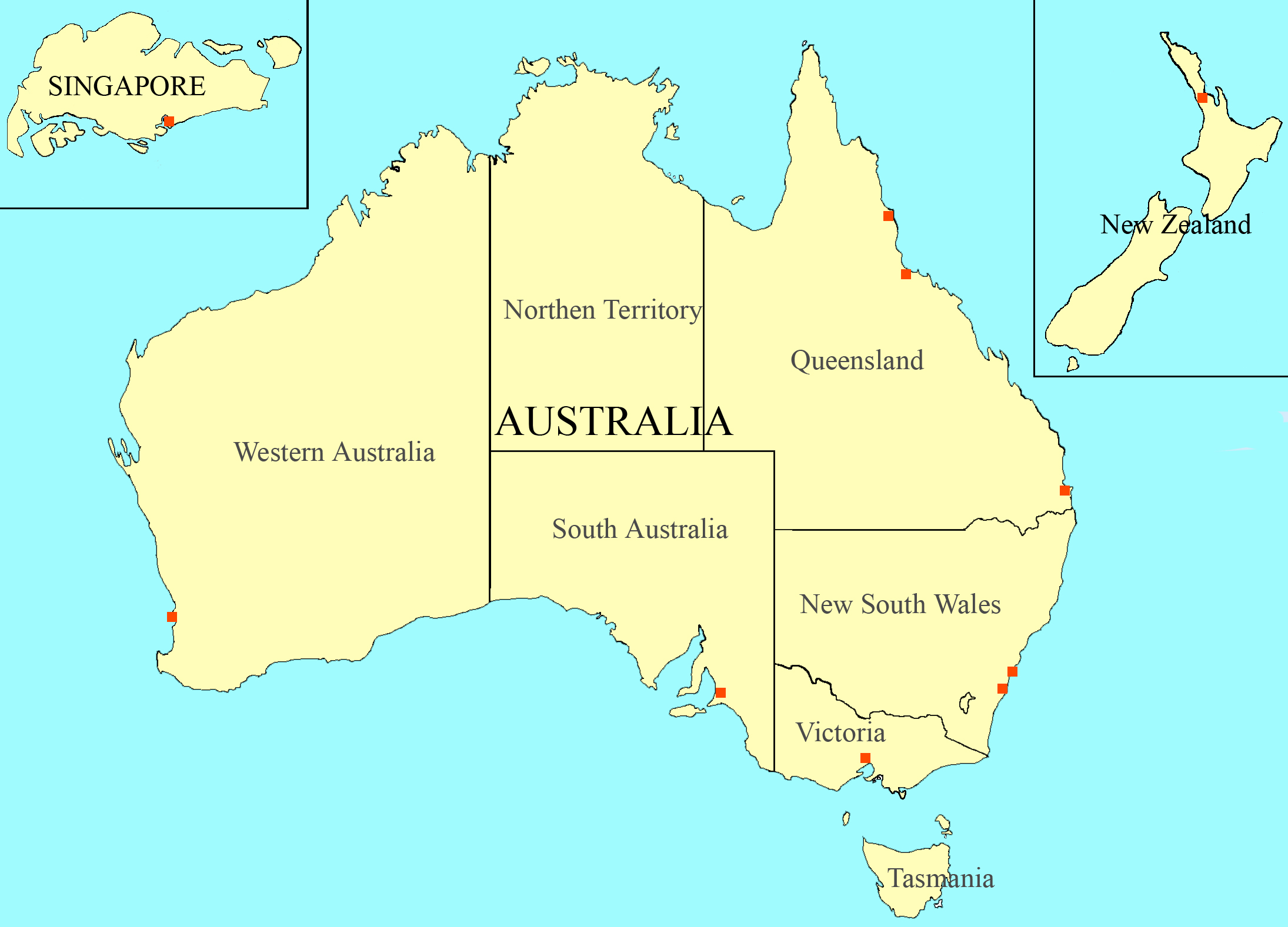

Team	Region	CEO	Coach	Home Venue	Capacity
Adelaide 36ers	SA	Mike Daws	Phil Smyth	Distinctive Homes Dome	8,000
Brisbane Bullets	QLD	Jeff Van Groningen	Joey Wright	Brisbane Convention & Exhibition Centre	4,000
Cairns Taipans	QLD	Juanita O'Brien	Alan Black	Cairns Convention Centre	5,300
Melbourne Tigers	VIC	Seamus McPeake	Alan Westover	State Netball Centre	3,500
New Zealand Breakers	NZL	Richard Clarke	Andrej Lemanis	North Shore Events Centre	4,400
Perth Wildcats	WA	Nick Marvin	Scott Fisher	Challenge Stadium	4,500
Singapore Slingers	SIN	Bob Turner	Gordon McLeod	Singapore Indoor Stadium	12,000
South Dragons	VIC	Craig Armstead	Mark Price; Shane Heal	Melbourne Arena	10,500
Sydney Kings	NSW	Simon Allatson	Brian Goorjian	Sydney Entertainment Centre	10,517
Townsville Crocodiles	QLD	Ian Smythe	Trevor Gleeson	Townsville Entertainment Centre	5,257
West Sydney Razorbacks	NSW	Robbie Cadee	Mark Watkins; Cal Bruton	State Sports Centre	5,006
Wollongong Hawks	NSW	Paul Young	Brendan Joyce; Eric Cooks	WIN Entertainment Centre	6,000

== Pre-Season Blitz ==
The Blitz, which is the official pre-season tournament of the Philips Championship, was held in Coffs Harbour on the Mid North Coast of New South Wales from 8–10 September and featured all 12 NBL teams including the Dragons and Slingers, who were on show for the first time.

=== Blitz Group stage ===
- The top four teams of each pool qualify for quarter-finals.

Pool A
	Team	Pts	W	L	PF	PA	Diff
1	Brisbane Bullets	9	3	0	197	169	+28
2	Perth Wildcats	7	2	1	173	172	-1
3	Adelaide 36ers	5	1	2	173	161	+12
4	Melbourne Tigers	5	1	2	159	165	-6
5	South Dragons	5	1	2	149	159	-10
6	West Sydney Razorbacks	5	1	2	142	167	-25

Pool B
	Team	Pts	W	L	PF	PA	Diff
1	Townsville Crocodiles	9	3	0	177	156	+21
2	Sydney Kings	9	3	0	174	158	+16
3	Cairns Taipans	7	2	1	179	165	+14
4	Wollongong Hawks	5	1	2	185	164	+21
5	New Zealand Breakers	3	0	3	159	189	-30
6	Singapore Slingers	3	0	3	140	182	-42

Fri 8 September 18:00	South Dragons	51	42	West Sydney Razorbacks
Fri 8 September 18:00	Brisbane Bullets	57	45	Perth Wildcats
Fri 8 September 18:00	Melbourne Tigers	63	56	Adelaide 36ers
Fri 8 September 18:55	South Dragons	36	50	Adelaide 36ers
Fri 8 September 18:55	Brisbane Bullets	68	57	West Sydney Razorbacks
Fri 8 September 18:55	Melbourne Tigers	53	61	Perth Wildcats
Sat 9 September 11:25	Melbourne Tigers	43	48	West Sydney Razorbacks
Sat 9 September 11:25	Adelaide 36ers	67	72	Brisbane Bullets
Sat 9 September 11:25	Perth Wildcats	67	62	South Dragons

Fri 8 September 19:50	Singapore Slingers	50	58	Townsville Crocodiles
Fri 8 September 19:50	Wollongong Hawks	60	67	Sydney Kings
Fri 8 September 19:50	New Zealand Breakers	61	74	Cairns Taipans
Fri 8 September 20:45	Singapore Slingers	51	56	Cairns Taipans
Fri 8 September 20:45	Wollongong Hawks	57	58	Townsville Crocodiles
Fri 8 September 20:45	New Zealand Breakers	49	54	Sydney Kings
Sat 9 September 12:20	Cairns Taipans	49	53	Sydney Kings
Sat 9 September 12:20	Townsville Crocodiles	61	49	New Zealand Breakers
Sat 9 September 12:20	Singapore Slingers	39	68	Wollongong Hawks

=== Pre-Season Blitz finals series ===
Quarterfinals
A1	Brisbane Bullets	82
B4	Wollongong Hawks	63
B2	Sydney Kings	73
A3	Adelaide 36ers	45
B1	Townsville Crocodiles	50
A4	Melbourne Tigers	73
A2	Perth Wildcats (OT)	63
B3	Cairns Taipans	57

Semifinals
Brisbane Bullets	67
Sydney Kings	46
Melbourne Tigers	67
Perth Wildcats	49

Grand final
Brisbane Bullets	53
Melbourne Tigers	39

=== Pre-Season Blitz Awards ===
==== Most Valuable Player ====
C. J. Bruton (Brisbane Bullets)

==== All-Star Five ====
C. J. Bruton (Brisbane Bullets)

Cortez Groves (Wollongong Hawks)

Nick Horvath (Adelaide 36ers)

Sam Mackinnon (Brisbane Bullets)

Darryl McDonald (Melbourne Tigers)

== Regular season ==
The 2006-07 Regular Season will take place over 21 Rounds between 20 September 2006 and 11 February 2007.

=== Round 1 ===
Date	Home	Score	Away	Venue	Crowd	Boxscore
20 September 2006	Singapore Slingers	98–91	Adelaide 36ers	Singapore Indoor Stadium	4,212	boxscore
22 September 2006	Townsville Crocodiles	117–103	Sydney Kings	Townsville Entertainment Centre	4,715	boxscore
22 September 2006	Perth Wildcats	94–82	Singapore Slingers	Challenge Stadium	3,000	boxscore
23 September 2006	Melbourne Tigers	94–86	Cairns Taipans	State Netball and Hockey Centre	2,820	boxscore
24 September 2006	Sydney Kings	109–100	Brisbane Bullets	Sydney Entertainment Centre	4,313	boxscore
24 September 2006	Wollongong Hawks	85–89	Adelaide 36ers	WIN Entertainment Centre	4,620	boxscore

=== Round 2 ===
Date	Home	Score	Away	Venue	Crowd	Boxscore
26 September 2006	New Zealand Breakers	112–106	South Dragons	North Shore Events Centre	3,433	boxscore
27 September 2006	Singapore Slingers	100–109	Perth Wildcats	Singapore Indoor Stadium	1,900	boxscore
27 September 2006	Adelaide 36ers	115–122	Sydney Kings	Adelaide Arena	3,980	boxscore
29 September 2006	Cairns Taipans	103–101	Wollongong Hawks	Cairns Convention Centre	N/A	boxscore
29 September 2006	Perth Wildcats	119–84	Adelaide 36ers	Challenge Stadium	4,132	boxscore
29 September 2006	Sydney Kings	109–83	South Dragons	AIS Arena	N/A	boxscore

=== Round 3 ===
Date	Home	Score	Away	Venue	Crowd	Boxscore
3/10/2006	Brisbane Bullets	98–85	Melbourne Tigers	Brisbane Convention Centre	3,380	boxscore
4/10/2006	Perth Wildcats	117–107	Townsville Crocodiles	Challenge Stadium	4,200	boxscore
4/10/2006	West Sydney Razorbacks	84–101	Cairns Taipans	State Sports Centre	2,354	boxscore
5/10/2006	New Zealand Breakers	94–99	Sydney Kings	North Shore Events Centre	1,911	boxscore
6/10/2006	Adelaide 36ers	103–113	Wollongong Hawks	Adelaide Arena	4,421	boxscore
7/10/2006	Townsville Crocodiles	108–102	Cairns Taipans	Townsville Entertainment Centre	4,722	boxscore
8/10/2006	Wollongong Hawks	101–108	Melbourne Tigers	WIN Entertainment Centre	2,879	boxscore

=== Round 4 ===
Date	Home	Score	Away	Venue	Crowd	Boxscore
9/10/2006	Singapore Slingers	126–89	West Sydney Razorbacks	Singapore Indoor Stadium	N/A	boxscore
11/10/2006	Brisbane Bullets	123–104	Townsville Crocodiles	Brisbane Convention Centre	3,018	boxscore
12/10/2006	Singapore Slingers	87–105	Wollongong Hawks	Singapore Indoor Stadium	1,000	boxscore
12/10/2006	New Zealand Breakers	88–105	Perth Wildcats	Trusts Stadium	1,475	boxscore
13 October 2006	Adelaide 36ers	93–115	Brisbane Bullets	Adelaide Arena	4,766	boxscore
13 October 2006	Townsville Crocodiles	115–111	Sydney Kings	Townsville Entertainment Centre	4,487	boxscore
14 October 2006	Cairns Taipans	91–90	Sydney Kings	Cairns Convention Centre	N/A	boxscore
14 October 2006	Melbourne Tigers	113–102	Singapore Slingers	State Netball and Hockey Centre	2,860	boxscore
14 October 2006	West Sydney Razorbacks	104–97	New Zealand Breakers	State Sports Centre	2,200	boxscore
14 October 2006	South Dragons	93–102	Wollongong Hawks	Vodafone Arena	5,106	boxscore
15 October 2006	Brisbane Bullets	87–90	Perth Wildcats	Brisbane Convention Centre	3,004	boxscore

=== Round 5 ===
Date	Home	Score	Away	Venue	Crowd	Boxscore
16 October 2006	Wollongong Hawks	98–95	New Zealand Breakers	WIN Entertainment Centre	3,462	boxscore
18 October 2006	Singapore Slingers	104–96	South Dragons	Singapore Indoor Stadium	1,200	boxscore
18 October 2006	Townsville Crocodiles	96–86	Perth Wildcats	Townsville Entertainment Centre	4,333	boxscore
18 October 2006	New Zealand Breakers	111–106	Brisbane Bullets	North Shore Events Centre	1,481	boxscore
20 October 2006	Adelaide 36ers	113–86	Townsville Crocodiles	Adelaide Arena	4,921	boxscore
20 October 2006	West Sydney Razorbacks	97–80	Singapore Slingers	State Sports Centre	2,592	boxscore
20 October 2006	Wollongong Hawks	86–115	Brisbane Bullets	WIN Entertainment Centre	3,945	boxscore
21 October 2006	Cairns Taipans	89–79	Perth Wildcats	Cairns Convention Centre	4,244	boxscore
21 October 2006	Melbourne Tigers	118–96	Adelaide 36ers	State Netball and Hockey Centre	2,530	boxscore
21 October 2006	Sydney Kings	142–99	West Sydney Razorbacks	Sydney Entertainment Centre	4,401	boxscore
22 October 2006	South Dragons	108–128	Melbourne Tigers	Vodafone Arena	7,910	boxscore

=== Round 6 ===
Date	Home	Score	Away	Venue	Crowd	Boxscore
25 October 2006	Perth Wildcats	99–97	Melbourne Tigers	Challenge Stadium	4,282	boxscore
25 October 2006	Adelaide 36ers	103–88	South Dragons	Adelaide Arena	3,896	boxscore
26 October 2006	Singapore Slingers	98–102	Cairns Taipans	Singapore Indoor Stadium	1,500	boxscore
26 October 2006	New Zealand Breakers	126–127	Townsville Crocodiles	North Shore Events Centre	N/A	boxscore
28 October 2006	Melbourne Tigers	98–83	Townsville Crocodiles	State Netball and Hockey Centre	2,898	boxscore
28 October 2006	West Sydney Razorbacks	103–105	Brisbane Bullets	State Sports Centre	2,687	boxscore
29 October 2006	South Dragons	96–86	Cairns Taipans	Ballarat Stadium	2,000	boxscore
29 October 2006	Singapore Slingers	83–90	Sydney Kings	Singapore Indoor Stadium	N/A	boxscore

=== Round 7 ===
Date	Home	Score	Away	Venue	Crowd	Boxscore
1/11/2006	Perth Wildcats	99–100	Brisbane Bullets	Challenge Stadium	4,100	boxscore
1/11/2006	Townsville Crocodiles	98–111	South Dragons	Townsville Entertainment Centre	4,292	boxscore
2/11/2006	New Zealand Breakers	118–97	Melbourne Tigers	North Shore Events Centre	1,112	boxscore
3/11/2006	West Sydney Razorbacks	114–116	Adelaide 36ers	State Sports Centre	2,482	boxscore
3/11/2006	Sydney Kings	116–97	Townsville Crocodiles	Sydney Entertainment Centre	3,449	boxscore
3/11/2006	South Dragons	95–111	Brisbane Bullets	Vodafone Arena	2,982	boxscore
3/11/2006	Cairns Taipans	98–90	Singapore Slingers	Cairns Convention Centre	N/A	boxscore
4/11/2006	Melbourne Tigers	117–120	Brisbane Bullets	State Netball and Hockey Centre	3,150	boxscore
4/11/2006	Adelaide 36ers	90–99	New Zealand Breakers	Adelaide Arena	5,012	boxscore
4/11/2006	Wollongong Hawks	113–107	Townsville Crocodiles	WIN Entertainment Centre	3,520	boxscore
5/11/2006	Perth Wildcats	119–107	West Sydney Razorbacks	Challenge Stadium	4,155	boxscore

=== Round 8 ===
Date	Home	Score	Away	Venue	Crowd	Boxscore
6/11/2006	South Dragons	113–92	Sydney Kings	Vodafone Arena	3,851	boxscore
8/11/2006	Wollongong Hawks	104–85	Cairns Taipans	WIN Entertainment Centre	2,200	boxscore
10/11/2006	Adelaide 36ers	95–116	Townsville Crocodiles	Adelaide Arena	4,721	boxscore
11/11/2006	Melbourne Tigers	111–102	Brisbane Bullets	State Netball and Hockey Centre	3,220	boxscore
11/11/2006	Perth Wildcats	90–81	Sydney Kings	Challenge Stadium	4,350	boxscore
11/11/2006	Cairns Taipans	113–99	New Zealand Breakers	Cairns Convention Centre	N/A	boxscore
11/11/2006	West Sydney Razorbacks	121–126	Wollongong Hawks	Bridgecoast Stadium	1,000	boxscore
11/11/2006	South Dragons	121–110	Townsville Crocodiles	Vodafone Arena	3,861	boxscore
12/11/2006	Brisbane Bullets	116–95	Adelaide 36ers	Brisbane Convention Centre	3,283	boxscore

=== Round 9 ===
Date	Home	Score	Away	Venue	Crowd	Boxscore
15 November 2006	Adelaide 36ers	110–102	West Sydney Razorbacks	Adelaide Arena	2,615	boxscore
16 November 2006	New Zealand Breakers	88–109	Sydney Kings	North Shore Events Centre	N/A	boxscore
17 November 2006	West Sydney Razorbacks	80–115	Perth Wildcats	State Sports Centre	N/A	boxscore
18 November 2006	Cairns Taipans	88–94	Melbourne Tigers	Cairns Convention Centre	N/A	boxscore
18 November 2006	Sydney Kings	92–88	South Dragons	Sydney Entertainment Centre	5,544	boxscore
18 November 2006	Townsville Crocodiles	117–96	Wollongong Hawks	Townsville Entertainment Centre	4,468	boxscore
18 November 2006	Brisbane Bullets	105–86	Perth Wildcats	Brisbane Convention Centre	N/A	boxscore

=== Round 10 ===
Date	Home	Score	Away	Venue	Crowd	Boxscore
22 November 2006	Cairns Taipans	122–119	Brisbane Bullets	Cairns Convention Centre	3,358	boxscore
22 November 2006	South Dragons	115–104	West Sydney Razorbacks	Vodafone Arena	3,017	boxscore
22 November 2006	Melbourne Tigers	101–92	Wollongong Hawks	State Netball and Hockey Centre	2,380	boxscore
23 November 2006	New Zealand Breakers	110–101	Adelaide 36ers	North Shore Events Centre	1,312	boxscore
23 November 2006	Sydney Kings	80–67	Perth Wildcats	AIS Arena	N/A	boxscore
24 November 2006	Brisbane Bullets	100–85	Cairns Taipans	Brisbane Convention Centre	N/A	boxscore
24 November 2006	West Sydney Razorbacks	104–105	South Dragons	State Sports Centre	N/A	boxscore

=== Round 11 ===
Date	Home	Score	Away	Venue	Crowd	Boxscore
27 November 2006	Brisbane Bullets	131–93	Singapore Slingers	Brisbane Convention Centre	2,547	boxscore
29 November 2006	Townsville Crocodiles	120–101	Singapore Slingers	Townsville Entertainment Centre	4,396	boxscore
29 November 2006	New Zealand Breakers	116–104	West Sydney Razorbacks	North Shore Events Centre	1,517	boxscore
30 November 2006	South Dragons	99–103	Perth Wildcats	Vodafone Arena	3,514	boxscore
1/12/2006	Cairns Taipans	109–96	Adelaide 36ers	Cairns Convention Centre	N/A	boxscore
2/12/2006	Wollongong Hawks	106–114	South Dragons	WIN Entertainment Centre	3,766	boxscore
2/12/2006	Townsville Crocodiles	105–93	Adelaide 36ers	Townsville Entertainment Centre	4,373	boxscore
2/12/2006	West Sydney Razorbacks	104–107	Melbourne Tigers	State Sports Centre	2,504	boxscore
2/12/2006	Brisbane Bullets	106–90	New Zealand Breakers	Brisbane Convention Centre	3,042	boxscore
3/12/2006	Sydney Kings	107–104	Cairns Taipans	Sydney Entertainment Centre	3,808	boxscore

=== Round 12 ===
Date	Home	Score	Away	Venue	Crowd	Boxscore
6/12/2006	Melbourne Tigers	106–92	Perth Wildcats	State Netball and Hockey Centre	2,865	boxscore
7/12/2006	New Zealand Breakers	113–106	Cairns Taipans	North Shore Events Centre	1,685	boxscore
8/12/2006	Townsville Crocodiles	115–102	South Dragons	Townsville Entertainment Centre	4,484	boxscore
8/12/2006	Sydney Kings	97–99	Adelaide 36ers	Sydney Entertainment Centre	N/A	boxscore
9/12/2006	West Sydney Razorbacks	90–93	Sydney Kings	Sydney SuperDome	N/A	boxscore
9/12/2006	Cairns Taipans	126–100	South Dragons	Cairns Convention Centre	N/A	boxscore
10/12/2006	Perth Wildcats	102–80	New Zealand Breakers	Challenge Stadium	4,400	boxscore
10/12/2006	Wollongong Hawks	84–110	Singapore Slingers	WIN Entertainment Centre	3,410	boxscore

=== Round 13 ===
Date	Home	Score	Away	Venue	Crowd	Boxscore
13 December 2006	Adelaide 36ers	107–90	West Sydney Razorbacks	Adelaide Arena	4,427	boxscore
13 December 2006	Singapore Slingers	111–94	New Zealand Breakers	Singapore Indoor Stadium	3,000	boxscore
15 December 2006	Sydney Kings	68–93	Melbourne Tigers	AIS Arena	2,400	boxscore
16 December 2006	Adelaide 36ers	102–100	Singapore Slingers	Adelaide Arena	4,072	boxscore
16 December 2006	Townsville Crocodiles	118–92	Cairns Taipans	Townsville Entertainment Centre	4,432	boxscore
16 December 2006	South Dragons	117–109	New Zealand Breakers	Vodafone Arena	4,201	boxscore
17 December 2006	Perth Wildcats	113–85	Wollongong Hawks	Challenge Stadium	3,700	boxscore
17 December 2006	Melbourne Tigers	119–117	New Zealand Breakers	State Netball and Hockey Centre	2,653	boxscore
17 December 2006	Brisbane Bullets	110–101	West Sydney Razorbacks	Brisbane Entertainment Centre	3,051	boxscore

=== Round 14 ===
Date	Home	Score	Away	Venue	Crowd	Boxscore
20 December 2006	Wollongong Hawks	108–101	Adelaide 36ers	WIN Entertainment Centre	3,420	boxscore
20 December 2006	Singapore Slingers	115–93	West Sydney Razorbacks	Singapore Indoor Stadium	N/A	boxscore
20 December 2006	South Dragons	94–126	Brisbane Bullets	Vodafone Arena	3,588	boxscore
21 December 2006	New Zealand Breakers	95–111	Townsville Crocodiles	North Shore Events Centre	3,024	boxscore
22 December 2006	Cairns Taipans	91–72	Wollongong Hawks	Cairns Convention Centre	N/A	boxscore
23 December 2006	Adelaide 36ers	102–107	South Dragons	Adelaide Arena	5,151	boxscore
23 December 2006	Melbourne Tigers	99–84	West Sydney Razorbacks	State Netball and Hockey Centre	2,512	boxscore
23 December 2006	Perth Wildcats	113–94	Sydney Kings	Challenge Stadium	4,300	boxscore
23 December 2006	Brisbane Bullets	137–97	Townsville Crocodiles	Brisbane Convention Centre	3,386	boxscore

=== Round 15 ===
Date	Home	Score	Away	Venue	Crowd	Boxscore
26 December 2006	South Dragons	107–94	Melbourne Tigers	Vodafone Arena	9,175	boxscore
27 December 2006	Sydney Kings	96–83	Cairns Taipans	Sydney Entertainment Centre	4,230	boxscore
27 December 2006	Perth Wildcats	105–88	Singapore Slingers	Challenge Stadium	4,200	boxscore
29 December 2006	Melbourne Tigers	106–94	Cairns Taipans	State Netball and Hockey Centre	2,990	boxscore
29 December 2006	Singapore Slingers	109–96	New Zealand Breakers	Newcastle Entertainment Centre	1,706	boxscore
29 December 2006	West Sydney Razorbacks	106–111	Townsville Crocodiles	Bridgecoast Stadium	1,000	boxscore
30 December 2006	Brisbane Bullets	112–108	Sydney Kings	Brisbane Convention Centre	3,600	boxscore
30 December 2006	South Dragons	104–108	Perth Wildcats	Vodafone Arena	4,692	boxscore
31 December 2006	Cairns Taipans	105–90	West Sydney Razorbacks	Cairns Convention Centre	4,460	boxscore
31 December 2006	Wollongong Hawks	100–105	South Dragons	WIN Entertainment Centre	3,620	boxscore
31 December 2006	Adelaide 36ers	94–88	Perth Wildcats	Adelaide Arena	4,345	boxscore
31 December 2006	Townsville Crocodiles	110–97	Melbourne Tigers	Townsville Entertainment Centre	5,257	boxscore

=== Round 16 ===
Date	Home	Score	Away	Venue	Crowd	Boxscore
1/01/2007	Sydney Kings	100–89	New Zealand Breakers	Sydney Entertainment Centre	N/A	boxscore
3/01/2007	Brisbane Bullets	121–113	Wollongong Hawks	Brisbane Convention Centre	3,053	boxscore
3/01/2007	Singapore Slingers	85–110	South Dragons	Singapore Indoor Stadium	N/A	boxscore
4/01/2007	Singapore Slingers	114–103	Townsville Crocodiles	Singapore Indoor Stadium	N/A	boxscore
5/01/2007	Wollongong Hawks	111–117	Melbourne Tigers	WIN Entertainment Centre	3,680	boxscore
6/01/2007	Cairns Taipans	112–106	New Zealand Breakers	Cairns Convention Centre	N/A	boxscore
6/01/2007	Melbourne Tigers	96–114	Adelaide 36ers	State Netball and Hockey Centre	3,500	boxscore
6/01/2007	Sydney Kings	95–90	Wollongong Hawks	Sydney Entertainment Centre	3,593	boxscore
6/01/2007	Perth Wildcats	101–81	West Sydney Razorbacks	Challenge Stadium	N/A	boxscore
6/01/2007	Brisbane Bullets	131–116	Singapore Slingers	Brisbane Convention Centre	3,051	boxscore
7/01/2007	Townsville Crocodiles	113–94	New Zealand Breakers	Townsville Entertainment Centre	4,480	boxscore

=== Round 17 ===
Date	Home	Score	Away	Venue	Crowd	Boxscore
10/01/2007	Singapore Slingers	96–88	Sydney Kings	Singapore Indoor Stadium	N/A	boxscore
10/01/2007	Melbourne Tigers	106–94	South Dragons	State Netball and Hockey Centre	3,500	boxscore
10/01/2007	West Sydney Razorbacks	90–129	Townsville Crocodiles	Coffs Harbour Stadium	N/A	boxscore
10/01/2007	Adelaide 36ers	99–111	Cairns Taipans	Adelaide Arena	5,475	boxscore
11/01/2007	New Zealand Breakers	102–132	Wollongong Hawks	North Shore Events Centre	N/A	boxscore
12/01/2007	Cairns Taipans	101–113	Singapore Slingers	Cairns Convention Centre	N/A	boxscore
12/01/2007	Perth Wildcats	107–96	Adelaide 36ers	Challenge Stadium	4,400	boxscore
13 January 2007	Wollongong Hawks	102–106	West Sydney Razorbacks	WIN Entertainment Centre	3,418	boxscore
13 January 2007	Townsville Crocodiles	140–100	Singapore Slingers	Townsville Entertainment Centre	4,707	boxscore
14 January 2007	Brisbane Bullets	108–95	Sydney Kings	Brisbane Convention Centre	3,600	boxscore
14 January 2007	West Sydney Razorbacks	82–115	Melbourne Tigers	State Sports Centre	N/A	boxscore
14 January 2007	South Dragons	103–115	Cairns Taipans	Geelong Arena	1,720	boxscore

=== Round 18 ===
Date	Home	Score	Away	Venue	Crowd	Boxscore
17 January 2007	Singapore Slingers	89–96	Melbourne Tigers	Singapore Indoor Stadium	5,000	boxscore
17 January 2007	Wollongong Hawks	115–97	Townsville Crocodiles	WIN Entertainment Centre	3,320	boxscore
18 January 2007	New Zealand Breakers	122–114	Adelaide 36ers	North Shore Events Centre	N/A	boxscore
18 January 2007	West Sydney Razorbacks	112–132	Brisbane Bullets	Albury Stadium	1,000	boxscore
19 January 2007	Cairns Taipans	103–119	Perth Wildcats	Cairns Convention Centre	N/A	boxscore
20 January 2007	Melbourne Tigers	106–101	New Zealand Breakers	State Netball and Hockey Centre	3,500	boxscore
20 January 2007	Sydney Kings	115–75	Adelaide 36ers	Sydney Entertainment Centre	N/A	boxscore
20 January 2007	Townsville Crocodiles	122–124	Perth Wildcats	Townsville Entertainment Centre	4,666	boxscore
20 January 2007	Brisbane Bullets	121–86	Wollongong Hawks	Brisbane Convention Centre	3,600	boxscore
20 January 2007	South Dragons	90–84	West Sydney Razorbacks	Dandenong Stadium	2,100	boxscore

=== Round 19 ===
Date	Home	Score	Away	Venue	Crowd	Boxscore
22 January 2007	Wollongong Hawks	84–88	Sydney Kings	WIN Entertainment Centre	3,620	boxscore
24 January 2007	Brisbane Bullets	117–101	South Dragons	Brisbane Convention Centre	3,435	boxscore
24 January 2007	New Zealand Breakers	103–100	Singapore Slingers	North Shore Events Centre	N/A	boxscore
25 January 2007	Townsville Crocodiles	103–110	Melbourne Tigers	Townsville Entertainment Centre	4,572	boxscore
25 January 2007	Perth Wildcats	97–88	Wollongong Hawks	Challenge Stadium	3,200	boxscore
25 January 2007	West Sydney Razorbacks	106–75	Sydney Kings	State Sports Centre	3,126	boxscore
27 January 2007	Adelaide 36ers	99–131	Brisbane Bullets	Adelaide Arena	5,044	boxscore
27 January 2007	Wollongong Hawks	80–99	New Zealand Breakers	WIN Entertainment Centre	3,336	boxscore
27 January 2007	Cairns Taipans	92–93	Townsville Crocodiles	Cairns Convention Centre	4,792	boxscore
27 January 2007	Melbourne Tigers	125–114	Singapore Slingers	State Netball and Hockey Centre	2,904	boxscore
28 January 2007	Perth Wildcats	100–98	South Dragons	Challenge Stadium	4,286	boxscore
28 January 2007	Sydney Kings	82–81	Melbourne Tigers	Sydney Entertainment Centre	N/A	boxscore

=== Round 20 ===
Date	Home	Score	Away	Venue	Crowd	Boxscore
31 January 2007	Singapore Slingers	105–100	Adelaide 36ers	Singapore Indoor Stadium	N/A	boxscore
31 January 2007	Melbourne Tigers	95–90	Perth Wildcats	State Netball and Hockey Centre	2,895	boxscore
1/02/2007	New Zealand Breakers	102–106	South Dragons	North Shore Events Centre	N/A	boxscore
2/02/2007	Cairns Taipans	97–92	West Sydney Razorbacks	Cairns Convention Centre	3,538	boxscore
2/02/2007	Wollongong Hawks	93–96	Singapore Slingers	WIN Entertainment Centre	3,419	boxscore
3/02/2007	Sydney Kings	105–81	Wollongong Hawks	AIS Arena	2,047	boxscore
3/02/2007	Townsville Crocodiles	123–93	West Sydney Razorbacks	Townsville Entertainment Centre	4,612	boxscore
3/02/2007	Adelaide 36ers	96–125	Melbourne Tigers	Adelaide Arena	4,103	boxscore
3/02/2007	South Dragons	100–114	Singapore Slingers	Vodafone Arena	6,249	boxscore
3/02/2007	Brisbane Bullets	132–98	New Zealand Breakers	Sleeman Sports Centre	N/A	boxscore
4/02/2007	Perth Wildcats	104–109	Cairns Taipans	Marrara Indoor Stadium	1,500	boxscore

=== Round 21 ===
Date	Home	Score	Away	Venue	Crowd	Boxscore
7/02/2007	South Dragons	149–147	Adelaide 36ers	Geelong Arena	1,001	boxscore
7/02/2007	Wollongong Hawks	94–92	Perth Wildcats	WIN Entertainment Centre	2,980	boxscore
7/02/2007	Singapore Slingers	102–134	Brisbane Bullets	Singapore Indoor Stadium	N/A	boxscore
8/02/2007	New Zealand Breakers	125–104	West Sydney Razorbacks	North Shore Events Centre	1,810	boxscore
9/02/2007	Adelaide 36ers	98–89	Cairns Taipans	Adelaide Arena	4,663	boxscore
10/02/2007	Townsville Crocodiles	128–130	Brisbane Bullets	Townsville Entertainment Centre	5,257	boxscore
10/02/2007	Melbourne Tigers	99–83	Sydney Kings	State Netball and Hockey Centre	3,500	boxscore
10/02/2007	West Sydney Razorbacks	101–91	Wollongong Hawks	State Sports Centre	N/A	boxscore
11/02/2007	Cairns Taipans	102–103	Brisbane Bullets	Cairns Convention Centre	N/A	boxscore
11/02/2007	Perth Wildcats	99–94	New Zealand Breakers	Challenge Stadium	4,500	boxscore
11/02/2007	Sydney Kings	102–76	Singapore Slingers	Sydney Entertainment Centre	N/A	boxscore

== Ladder ==
Pos	2006–07 NBL season											
Pos	Team	Pld	W	L	PCT	Last 5	Streak	Home	Away	PF	PA	PP
1	Brisbane Bullets	33	28	5	84.85%	5–0	W18	16–1	12–4	3804	3326	114.37%
2	Melbourne Tigers	33	25	8	75.76%	4–1	W3	15–2	10–6	3453	3228	106.97%
3	Perth Wildcats	33	23	10	69.70%	2–3	W1	14–3	8–8	3331	3113	107.00%
4	Sydney Kings	33	20	13	60.61%	3–2	W1	14–2	6–11	3236	3119	103.75%
5	Townsville Crocodiles	33	19	14	57.58%	2–3	L1	13–4	6–10	3626	3516	103.13%
6	Cairns Taipans	33	17	16	51.52%	2–3	L2	11–6	5–11	3292	3284	100.24%
7	South Dragons	33	15	18	45.45%	2–3	W1	8–8	7–10	3418	3514	97.27%
8	Singapore Slingers	33	13	20	39.39%	3–2	L2	9–7	4–13	3297	3435	95.98%
9	Wollongong Hawks^{1 2}	33	11	22	33.33%	1–4	L1	6–11	5–11	3237	3395	95.35%
10	New Zealand Breakers^{1 2}	33	11	22	33.33%	2–3	L1	9–7	2–15	3382	3538	95.59%
11	Adelaide 36ers^{1}	33	11	22	33.33%	1–4	W1	7–9	4–13	3326	3555	93.56%
12	West Sydney Razorbacks	33	5	28	15.15%	2–3	W1	4–12	1–16	3221	3600	89.47%

Updated to match(es) played on 11 February 2007. Source: NBL.com.au

The NBL tie-breaker system as outlined in the NBL Rules and Regulations states that in the case of an identical win–loss record, the results in games played between the teams will determine order of seeding.

^{1}3-way Head-to-Head between Wollongong Hawks (4-2), New Zealand Breakers (4-2) and Adelaide 36ers (1-5).

^{2}Wollongong Hawks won Head-to-Head (2-1).

== Finals ==
=== Playoff bracket ===
Elimination Finals
5	Townsville Crocodiles	106
8	Singapore Slingers	93
6	Cairns Taipans	118
7	South Dragons	97

Quarterfinals
4	Sydney Kings	122
5	Townsville Crocodiles	89
3	Perth Wildcats	78
6	Cairns Taipans	82

Semifinals
1	Brisbane Bullets	91	93	X
4	Sydney Kings	84	86	X
2	Melbourne Tigers	100	95	X
6	Cairns Taipans	87	87	X

Grand Final
1	Brisbane Bullets	98	91	113	103	X
2	Melbourne Tigers	95	105	93	94	X

=== Elimination Finals ===
Date	Home	Score	Away	Venue	Crowd	Boxscore
14 February 2007	Townsville Crocodiles	106–93	Singapore Slingers	Townsville Entertainment Centre	3,964	boxscore
15 February 2007	Cairns Taipans	118–97	South Dragons	Cairns Convention Centre	5,006	boxscore
16 February 2007	Sydney Kings	122–89	Townsville Crocodiles	Sydney Entertainment Centre	4,178	boxscore
17 February 2007	Perth Wildcats	78–82	Cairns Taipans	Challenge Stadium	4,400	boxscore

=== Semi-finals ===
Date	Home	Score	Away	Venue	Crowd	Boxscore
20 February 2007	Brisbane Bullets	91–84	Sydney Kings	Brisbane Entertainment Centre	5,388	boxscore
21 February 2007	Melbourne Tigers	100–87	Cairns Taipans	State Netball and Hockey Centre	2,839	boxscore
22 February 2007	Sydney Kings	86–93	Brisbane Bullets	Sydney Entertainment Centre	4,368	boxscore
23 February 2007	Cairns Taipans	87–95	Melbourne Tigers	Cairns Convention Centre	5,343	boxscore

=== Grand Final ===
Date	Home	Score	Away	Venue	Crowd	Boxscore
2/03/2007	Brisbane Bullets	98–95	Melbourne Tigers	Brisbane Entertainment Centre	7,291	boxscore
4/03/2007	Melbourne Tigers	105–91	Brisbane Bullets	State Netball and Hockey Centre	3,500	boxscore
7/03/2007	Brisbane Bullets	113–93	Melbourne Tigers	Brisbane Entertainment Centre	7,539	boxscore
9/03/2007	Melbourne Tigers	94–103	Brisbane Bullets	State Netball and Hockey Centre	3,500	boxscore

== All Star Game ==
Fox Sports

25 November 2006
19:40

boxscore
report

Aussie All Stars	133–136	World All Stars
Scoring by quarter: 34–34, 38–34, 30–26, 34–39
Pts: Anstey 30; Rebs: Pepper 9 Asts: Bruton, McDonald 11		Pts: Farley 25; Rebs: Tucker 13; Asts: Tucker 9
World All Stars win, 136–133

Adelaide Arena, Adelaide
Attendance: 5,124

=== Starters ===
Name	Club	Position
Chris Anstey	Melbourne Tigers	Centre
Joe Ingles	South Dragons	Small forward
Sam Mackinnon	Brisbane Bullets	Power forward
Darryl McDonald	Melbourne Tigers	Point guard
Brad Newley	Townsville Crocodiles	Shooting guard

=== Reserves ===
Name	Club	Position
Ben Pepper	New Zealand Breakers	Centre
C. J. Bruton	Brisbane Bullets	Guard
Tony Ronaldson	Perth Wildcats	Forward
Paul Rogers	Perth Wildcats	Centre
Martin Cattalini	Cairns Taipans	Forward

=== Starters ===
Name	Club	Position
Shawn Redhage	Perth Wildcats	Centre
Rashad Tucker	Melbourne Tigers	Power forward
Larry Abney	Townsville Crocodiles	Small forward
Cortez Groves	Wollongong Hawks	Point guard
Willie Farley	Adelaide 36ers	Shooting guard

=== Reserves ===
Name	Club	Position
Nick Horvath	Adelaide 36ers	Power forward
Carlos Powell	New Zealand Breakers	Forward
Mike Helms	Singapore Slingers	Guard
Dave Thomas	Melbourne Tigers	Forward
Kevin Owens	Cairns Taipans	Centre

=== Dunk Competition ===
- Carlos Powell (New Zealand Breakers)

=== Most Valuable Player ===
- Rashad Tucker (Melbourne Tigers) Representing the World All Starts - 21 points, 12 rebounds, 9 assists.

== Awards ==
- NBL Most Valuable Player: Sam Mackinnon, Brisbane Bullets
- Larry Sengstock Medal (GF MVP): Sam Mackinnon, Brisbane Bullets
- Coach of the Year: Joey Wright, Brisbane Bullets
- Best Defensive Player: Sam Mackinnon, Brisbane Bullets
- Rookie of the Year: Joe Ingles, South Dragons
- Most Improved Player: Liam Rush, West Sydney Razorbacks
- Best Sixth Man: Stephen Hoare, Melbourne Tigers

== All NBL Team ==
#	Player	Team
PG	Dave Thomas	Melbourne Tigers
SG	Sam Mackinnon	Brisbane Bullets
SF	Martin Cattalini	Cairns Taipans
PF	Carlos Powell	New Zealand Breakers
C	Chris Anstey	Melbourne Tigers

=== Philips Player of the Week ===
- Round 1: John Rillie (Townsville Crocodiles)
- Round 2: Martin Cattalini (Cairns Taipans)
- Round 3: Shawn Redhage (Perth Wildcats)
- Round 4: Cortez Groves (Wollongong Hawks)
- Round 5: Carlos Powell (New Zealand Breakers)
- Round 6: Brad Newley (Townsville Crocodiles)
- Round 7 – Carlos Powell (New Zealand Breakers) ^{Named twice}
- Round 8 – Shawn Redhage (Perth Wildcats) ^{Named twice}
- Round 9 – Larry Abney (Townsville Crocodiles)
- Round 10 – Martin Cattalini (Cairns Taipans) ^{Named twice}
- Round 11 - John Rillie (Townsville Crocodiles) ^{Named twice}
- Round 12: - Marquin Chandler (Singapore Slingers)
- Round 13 – Carlos Powell (New Zealand Breakers) ^{Named three times}
- Round 14 - Sam Mackinnon (Brisbane Bullets)
- Round 15 - Rosell Ellis (South Dragons)
- Round 16 - Ed Scott (Sydney Kings)
- Round 17 - Adam Ballinger (Wollongong Hawks)
- Round 18 - Chris Anstey (Melbourne Tigers)
- Round 19 - Dusty Rychart (Brisbane Bullets)
- Round 20 - Chris Anstey (Melbourne Tigers) ^{Named twice}
- Round 21 - John Rillie (Townsville Crocodiles) ^{Named three times}

=== Philips Player of the Month ===
- September/October: Martin Cattalini (Cairns Taipans)
- November – Carlos Powell (New Zealand Breakers)
- December - Carlos Powell (New Zealand Breakers) ^{Named twice}

=== Coach of the Month ===
- September/October: Scott Fisher (Perth Wildcats)
- November – Joey Wright (Brisbane Bullets)
- December - Trevor Gleeson (Townsville Crocodiles)
