= Norman Taylor (basketball) =

American-Australian basketball player (1965–2020)

Personal information
- Born: September 10, 1965 New York City, New York, U.S.
- Died: November 14, 2020 (aged 55) New South Wales, Australia
- Listed height: 6 ft 7 in (2.01 m)

Career information
- High school: Louis D. Brandeis (Manhattan, New York)
- College: Bridgeport (1984–1988)
- NBA draft: 1988: undrafted
- Playing career: 1989–1991
- Position: Center
- Number: 42

Career history
- 1989–1991: Illawarra Hawks

Career highlights
- 2× NBL All-Star (1989, 1990); Third-team Division II All-American – NABC (1987)

Norman Taylor Jr. (September 10, 1965 – November 14, 2020) was an American-Australian basketball player who played three seasons in the Australian National Basketball League (NBL) for the Illawarra Hawks. At 6 ft 7 in (2.01 m), he played center for the Hawks. He played college basketball for the Bridgeport Purple Knights, earning All-American honors in 1987.

== College career ==
Born and raised in New York City, Taylor attended the University of Bridgeport of the NCAA Division II in Bridgeport, Connecticut. He played four seasons of college basketball for the Purple Knights from 1984 to 1988. As a freshman during the 1984–85 season, he was a key component in leading the Purple Knights to the New England Collegiate Conference Championship and an NCAA Regional appearance. During his junior season, Taylor led the Purple Knights with 22.0 points and 12.1 rebounds per game. He became only the seventh all-time Bridgeport men's basketball player to be selected as an NABC All-American, earning third team honors for 1986–87. As of 2011, Taylor ranked second all-time in career points (2,170) and was still one of only three Bridgeport players to eclipse the 2,000 career-point plateau. He was inducted into the UB Athletic Hall of Fame in 2011.

== NBL career ==
In 1989, Taylor moved to Australia to play for the Illawarra Hawks in the NBL. He played 67 games for the Hawks over three seasons. He averaged 27.6 points and 10.5 rebounds per game in his career and was selected to play in the NBL All-Star game in both 1989 and 1990. As of November 2020, he is the only Hawks player ever to score 50 points in a game when he posted 54 against the Eastside Spectres in May 1990 on 22-from-29 shooting from the field and 13 rebounds. He also became the first Hawks player to record a triple-double in the NBL when he recorded 27 points, 10 assists and 12 rebounds against Newcastle in 1991. He was named the Hawks' Club MVP in each of his three seasons and his career shooting percentage from the field of 65.2% remains the best in NBL history by any player. He also led the NBL in field goal shooting in 1990 at 67% and in 1991 at 70%. As of September 2017, his 1990 season is considered the greatest individual statistical season in NBL history.

In January 2018, Taylor was named one of the 12 Greatest Hawks of All Time by the Illawarra Mercury.

== Post-playing career and personal life ==
Taylor remained in Australia following his three-year NBL stint, settling down in New South Wales. He was well known in the Illawarra region and in the Wollongong suburb of Woonona. He ran a successful chicken shop and worked for Qantas. He had two sons, Jordan and Adonis, who both played basketball for Illawarra under age sides.

Taylor died from a heart attack at age 55 on November 14, 2020.
