= Illawarra Hawks =

Australian basketball team

- 2026–27 Illawarra Hawks season
- Leagues: NBL
- Founded: 1979; 47 years ago
- History: Illawarra Hawks; 1979–1998; 2015–2020; 2021–present Wollongong Hawks; 1998–2015; The Hawks; 2020–2021
- Arena: WIN Entertainment Centre
- Location: Wollongong, New South Wales
- Team colors: Black, red, white
- General manager: Mat Campbell
- Head coach: Justin Tatum
- Team captain: Sam Froling; Tyler Harvey
- Ownership: Crest Sport & Entertainment
- Championships: 2 (2001, 2025)
- Retired numbers: 5 (4, 5, 12, 32, 33)
- Website: Hawks.com.au
Home	Away

The Illawarra Hawks (formerly the Wollongong Hawks and The Hawks) are an Australian professional basketball team based in Wollongong, New South Wales. The Illawarra Hawks compete in the National Basketball League (NBL) and play their home games at WIN Entertainment Centre, known colloquially as "The Sandpit". The Illawarra Hawks are the only remaining NBL team to have competed in every season since the league's inception in 1979. The team won their first NBL Championship in 2001, their second in 2025, and have finished as runners-up in 2005, 2010 and 2017.

== History ==
Wollongong Hawks logo (1998–2011)

The team began as the Illawarra Hawks in the New South Wales Men's Division 1 championship before joining the National Basketball League (NBL) for its inaugural season in 1979, playing their home games at Snakepit Stadium in Gwynneville. In 1981, import Mike Jones was named NBL Most Valuable Player. In 1987, the Hawks had their best season to date, finishing in third place with a 20–6 record.

In 1998, the team was renamed the Wollongong Hawks and moved into WIN Entertainment Centre.

The 2000/01 season marked history for the Hawks as they won their maiden NBL Championship. Prior to the start of the season, coach Brendan Joyce changed almost half his roster, adding Charles Thomas, Damon Lowery, Grant Kruger, Matt Shanahan and Axel Dench. After finishing the regular season in fourth with a club-best 21 wins from 28 games, Wollongong upset Perth in the first round of the post-season before conquering Adelaide when Lowery sunk three free throws with no time on the clock in game three of the semi-final series. The Hawks went on to beat Townsville 2–1 in the grand final to capture the team's only title. The Hawks became the first New South Wales team to reach and win a grand final in the NBL's 23-year history.

The Hawks returned to the NBL Grand Final in 2004/05, where they lost to the Sydney Kings.

In February 2009, captain Mat Campbell started the "Save the Hawks" campaign after the ownership group declared the team would not be able to join revamped league in 2009/10 on financial grounds. Campbell and his small team reached their goal, thanks to the commitment of the Illawarra community, naming rights sponsor ahm Health Insurance, and a bank guarantee provided by Indian mining magnate Mr. Arun Jagatramka from Gujarat NRE. A not-for-profit community-based company formed as Wollongong Hawks Basketball Limited was established to operate the Hawks into the future.

In 2009/10, they made their third appearance in the grand final series, this time coming up short to the Perth Wildcats. In 2010/11, import Gary Ervin was named MVP of the league, becoming the first Hawk to win the award since Mike Jones in 1981. In 2013/14, import Rotnei Clarke was named MVP of the league, becoming the third Hawk to win the award.

In July 2014, a new era was ushered in by the Hawks after Telecommunications entrepreneur James Spenceley was successful in his bid to become the organisation's new owner. However, following a dismal 2014/15 season, the organisation was dealt a substantial off-court blow with Wollongong Coal withdrawing their major sponsorship 1½ years into a five-year contract. The Hawks subsequently decided to place themselves into Voluntary Administration on 2 March 2015. On 25 March 2015, the Hawks secured Multi Civil and Rail as their major sponsor, as the company committed to a one-year deal.

On 22 June 2015, the organisation announced that the team would revert to its original name, the Illawarra Hawks, to better reflect not only the city of Wollongong, but also the surrounding area including the city of Shellharbour, the town of Kiama and the Wingecarribee Shire.

The Hawks logo (2020–2021)

Following long-time coach Gordie McLeod's departure, Rob Beveridge was signed as head coach for the 2015/16 season. He nabbed the trio of New Zealand sharp shooter Kirk Penney, big man AJ Ogilvy, and US point guard Kevin Lisch. The trio were dubbed "the three-headed monster", but they were unsuccessful in leading the Hawks to a championship, falling short in the semi-finals. Lisch was named MVP of the league, becoming the fourth Hawk to win the award.

With Lisch and Penney departing after one season, the Hawks reacquired the serves of Rotnei Clarke for the 2016/17 season. He helped them reach the NBL Grand Final for the first time since 2010, where they were defeated 3–0 by the Perth Wildcats.

On 17 June 2019, high school phenom LaMelo Ball announced on ESPN's The Jump that he will sign with the Illawarra Hawks. Ball became the second high school phenom to enter the NBL's Next Stars program for the 2019–20 NBL season, with R. J. Hampton of the New Zealand Breakers being the first. The pair played against each other on 24 October 2019, with the game between the Hawks and the New Zealand Breakers becoming the most watched game in NBL history with nearly two million views globally on Facebook.

In April 2020, the NBL took back the licence for the Illawarra Hawks after the club was placed into voluntary administration. In May 2020, creditors voted to liquidate the Hawks, but the NBL vowed to keep club alive. On 17 June 2020 the NBL announced that Dorry Kordahi, Bryan Colangelo and Michael Proctor had been awarded the license for the club.

Under the agreement with the new ownership, the team was renamed The Hawks, in an effort to broaden the team's appeal in New South Wales. The NBL faced fierce backlash to the decision to strip the Illawarra name, and in February 2021 the NBL agreed to allow the club to be renamed the Illawarra Hawks after a successful campaign by the new owners to boost membership and corporate support.

In the 2022–23 season, the Hawks had four imports suffer season-ending injuries: Justin Robinson, George King, Peyton Siva and Michael Frazier II.

In the 2024–25 season, the Hawks earned their first ever minor premiership by finishing on top of the ladder with a 20–9 record. They went on to reach the NBL Grand Final with a 2–1 semi-finals series victory over the South East Melbourne Phoenix. In the grand final series, the Hawks and Melbourne United split the first four games, each winning their two games on the road. In a game three loss at home, import Trey Kell suffered a knee injury that ruled him out of game four. In game four in Melbourne, the Hawks lost centre Sam Froling to an Achilles injury in the second quarter but went on to win the game and send the series to game five in Wollongong. Kell returned in game five and alongside William Hickey, helped the Hawks win the championship with a 114–104 series-clinching victory. It marked the Hawks' first championship since 2001. The team was subsequently presented with the keys to the city by the City of Wollongong, a common practice when a Wollongong sporting team wins a national title.

== Name, logo and uniforms ==
The team's colours are red and white. The logo consists of a red hawk with large centred text of "Hawks". The Hawk is holding a basketball in its talons. Predominately black uniforms are used for home games, and predominantly white uniforms for away games.

== Home arenas ==
The Hawks play their home games at WIN Entertainment Centre in Wollongong, which holds a capacity of 6,000 seats when in full basketball format. The Hawks are the only full-time tenants at the arena and have been playing at the arena since the 1998–99 NBL season.

Prior to this season, the Hawks played out of the 2,000 seat Snakepit Stadium for twenty seasons starting from the club's inception in 1979. The Hawks continue to use the stadium as a training facility and also play some pre-season games there.

The Hawks record home attendance of 5,839 was set on 18 February 2005 against the Sydney Kings at the WIN Entertainment Centre during Round 21 of the 2004–05 NBL season.

- Snakepit Stadium (1979–1998)
- WIN Entertainment Centre (1998–present)

== Retired jerseys ==
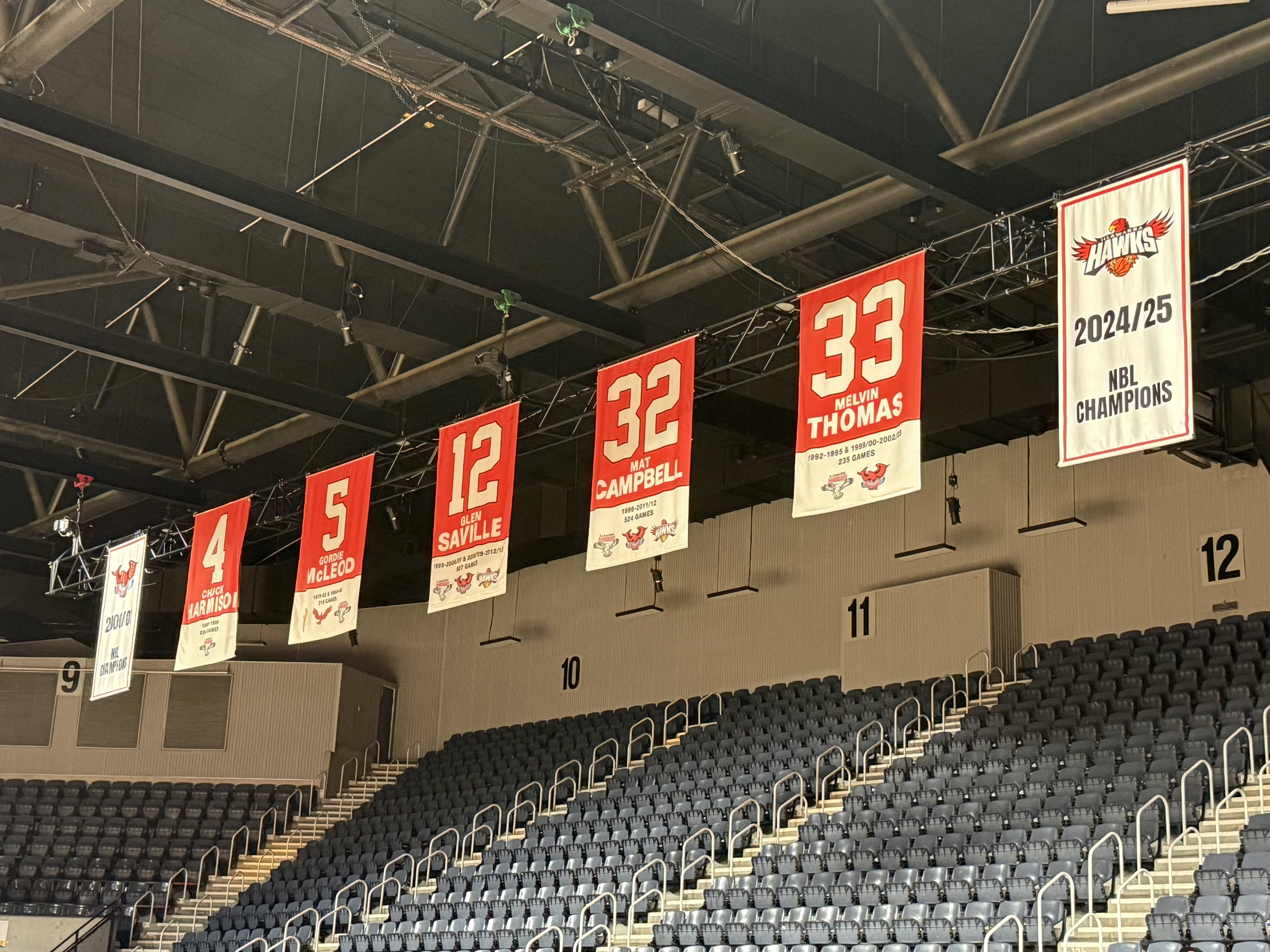
Illawarra Hawks retired jerseys and championship banners hanging at WIN Entertainment Centre, December 2025

Illawarra Hawks retired numbers
No.	Nat.	Player	Position	Tenure
4	(United States)	Chuck Harmison	F/C	1988–1996
5	(Australia)	Gordie McLeod	G	1979–1982, 1984–1988
12	(Australia)	Glen Saville	G/F	1995–2007, 2008–2013
32	(Australia)	Mat Campbell	G/F	1996–2012
33	(United States)	Melvin Thomas	F	1992–1995, 1999–2003

Source: Retired Numbers

== Current roster ==
Note: Flags indicate national team eligibility at FIBA-sanctioned events. Players may hold other non-FIBA nationalities not displayed.

Illawarra Hawks roster
Players
Coaches

Pos.	No.	Nat.	Name	Ht.	Wt.
G	1	(Australia)	Harvey, Tyler (C)	1.93 m (6 ft 4 in)	84 kg (185 lb)
F	3	(Australia)	Doyle, Amarco (DP)	2.00 m (6 ft 7 in)
G	5	(Australia)	Adnam, Kyle (NRP)	1.86 m (6 ft 1 in)	84 kg (185 lb)
G	6	(Australia)	Hickey, William	1.94 m (6 ft 4 in)	92 kg (203 lb)
G/F	9	(Australia)	Swaka Lo Buluk, Wani	1.98 m (6 ft 6 in)	88 kg (194 lb)
G	10	(Australia)	McGregor, Brodie (DP)
G/F	11	(Australia)	Grida, Daniel	1.97 m (6 ft 6 in)	93 kg (205 lb)
F/C	13	(Australia)	Froling, Sam (C)	2.13 m (7 ft 0 in)	109 kg (240 lb)
G	16	(Australia)	Narkle, Johny	1.99 m (6 ft 6 in)	79 kg (174 lb)
F	21	(Australia)	Blanchfield, Todd	1.98 m (6 ft 6 in)	98 kg (216 lb)
F	22	(Australia)	Peatling, Mason (injured)	2.03 m (6 ft 8 in)	105 kg (231 lb)
G/F	24	(United States)	Patterson, Lamar (IRP)	1.96 m (6 ft 5 in)	100 kg (220 lb)
F	25	(Australia)	MacDonald, Fletcher (DP)	2.03 m (6 ft 8 in)	93 kg (205 lb)
F	30	(United States)	Martin, Kelan (I)	1.96 m (6 ft 5 in)	104 kg (229 lb)
G	35	(United States)	Doyle, Milton (I)	1.93 m (6 ft 4 in)	86 kg (190 lb)
C	44	(Australia)	Maker, Makur	2.08 m (6 ft 10 in)	107 kg (236 lb)

Head coach

- (United States) Justin Tatum

Assistant coach(es)

- (Australia) Tom Cranney
- (Australia) Matt Flinn
- (Australia) Sam Gruggen
- (Australia) Joel Khalu

Strength & conditioning coach(es)

- (Australia) Alex Moore

Legend

- (C) Team captain
- (DP) Development player
- (I) Import player
- (TP) Training player
- (IRP) Injury replacement player
- (NRP) Nominated replacement player
- (NS) Next Star player
- Injured

- Roster
Updated: 9 October 2026

=== Notable players ===
Note: Flags indicate national team eligibility at FIBA-sanctioned events. Players may hold other non-FIBA nationalities not displayed.

Criteria

To appear in this section a player must have either:

- Set a club record or won an individual award while at the club
- Played at least one official international match for their national team at any time
- Played at least one official NBA match at any time.

- (Australia) David Andersen
- (United States) LaMelo Ball
- (Australia) Adam Ballinger
- (Australia) Todd Blanchfield
- (United States) Josh Boone
- (Australia) Ray Borner
- (United States) Aaron Brooks
- (Australia) C. J. Bruton
- (Australia) Mat Campbell
- (Australia) Adam Caporn
- (United States) Gary Clark
- (United States) Rotnei Clarke
- (Australia) Tim Coenraad
- (United States) Demitrius Conger
- (Australia) Mark Dalton
- (Australia) Larry Davidson
- (United States) Darius Days
- (Dominican Republic) Adris De León
- (Australia) Tyson Demos
- (Australia) Cody Ellis
- (United States) Gary Ervin
- (Australia) Oscar Forman
- (New Zealand) Casey Frank
- (Australia) Sam Froling
- (United States) Cortez Groves
- (United States) Tyler Harvey
- (United States) Darington Hobson
- (United States) Cedric Jackson
- (Australia) Daniel Jackson
- (United States) AJ Johnson
- (United States) Mike Jones
- (Australia) Nick Kay
- (United States) / (Syria) Trey Kell
- (New Zealand) Jeremy Kench
- (United States) George King
- (South Korea) Lee Hyun-jung
- (Australia) Kevin Lisch
- (United States) / (Australia) Damon Lowery
- (Australia) Rhys Martin
- (Australia) Mangok Mathiang
- (United States) Tywain McKee
- (Australia) Gordon McLeod
- (United States) / (Australia) Darnell Mee
- (United States) Todd Mundt
- (Australia) Luke Nevill
- (Australia) Mitch Norton
- (Australia) Andrew Ogilvy
- (United States) Doug Overton
- (New Zealand) Kirk Penney
- (Australia) Anthony Petrie
- (Australia) Duop Reath
- (Australia) Cameron Rigby
- (Australia) Glen Saville
- (Australia) Matt Shanahan
- (United States) Justin Simon
- (United States) Jim Slacke
- (Australia) Matt Smith
- (New Zealand) Lindsay Tait
- (United States) Charles Thomas
- (United States) Kevin Tiggs
- (Australia) Cameron Tragardh
- (Australia) Jarrad Weeks
- (Australia) Kevin White

== Coaches ==
There have been twelve different head coaches for the Hawks during their history. Charlie Ammit was the first coach of the Hawks to take the team to a finals series when his side finished fourth in the regular season with a 13–11 record. Brendan Joyce was the first coach to both win the Championship (in 2000–01) and claim runners-up (in 2004–05). He was also the first coach to claim runners-up in the regular season (in 2003–04). Both Joyce (2004–05) and Gordie McLeod (2009–10) have the unfortunate honour of claiming the runners-up prize in both the regular season and finals series in the same year. Eric Cooks became the first captain of the club (1999–00) to also become a coach (2006–2009). McLeod is the only other captain (1980–1982 and 1984–1988) to have accomplished this when took over from Cooks in 2009.

== Season by season ==
NBL champions	League champions	Runners-up	Finals berth

Season	Tier	League	Regular season					Post-season	Head coach	Captain	Club MVP
Season	Tier	League	Finish	Played	Wins	Losses	Win %	Post-season	Head coach	Captain	Club MVP
Illawarra Hawks
1979	1	NBL	8th	18	5	13	.278	Did not qualify	Joe Farrugia	Bob Kubbinga	not awarded
1980	1	NBL	6th	22	13	9	.591	Did not qualify	Adrian Hurley	Gordie McLeod	not awarded
1981	1	NBL	8th	22	9	13	.409	Did not qualify	Joe Farrugia	Gordie McLeod	not awarded
1982	1	NBL	9th	26	11	15	.423	Did not qualify	Tom Pottenger	Gordie McLeod	not awarded
1983	1	NBL	7th	22	4	18	.182	Did not qualify	Charlie Ammit	Mike Jones	not awarded
1984	1	NBL	4th	24	13	11	.542	Lost elimination final (Newcastle) 101–108	Charlie Ammit	Gordie McLeod	not awarded
1985	1	NBL	9th	26	10	16	.385	Did not qualify	Ted Weston	Gordie McLeod	not awarded
1986	1	NBL	5th	26	15	11	.577	Won elimination final (West Sydney) 105–86; Lost semifinal (Adelaide) 92–116	Dave Lindstrom	Gordie McLeod	not awarded
1987	1	NBL	3rd	26	20	6	.769	Won elimination final (North Melbourne) 105–97; Lost semifinals (Brisbane) 1–2	Dave Lindstrom	Gordie McLeod	not awarded
1988	1	NBL	7th	24	11	13	.458	Did not qualify	Dave Lindstrom	Gordie McLeod	not awarded
1989	1	NBL	11th	24	7	17	.292	Did not qualify	Dave Lindstrom	Chuck Harmison	Norman Taylor
1990	1	NBL	8th	26	13	13	.500	Did not qualify	Dave Lindstrom	Chuck Harmison	Norman Taylor
1991	1	NBL	13th	26	6	20	.231	Did not qualify	Dave Lindstrom	Chuck Harmison	Norman Taylor
1992	1	NBL	5th	24	13	11	.542	Lost quarterfinals (North Melbourne) 0–2	Dave Lindstrom	Chuck Harmison	Doug Overton
1993	1	NBL	6th	26	15	11	.577	Lost quarterfinals (Melbourne) 0–2	Alan Black	Chuck Harmison	Melvin Thomas
1994	1	NBL	8th	26	13	13	.500	Lost quarterfinals (Melbourne) 0–2	Alan Black	Chuck Harmison	Melvin Thomas
1995	1	NBL	7th	26	14	12	.538	Lost quarterfinals (S.E. Melbourne) 1–2	Alan Black	Chuck Harmison	Melvin Thomas
1996	1	NBL	10th	26	9	17	.346	Did not qualify	Brendan Joyce	Chuck Harmison	Terry Johnson
1997	1	NBL	11th	30	7	23	.233	Did not qualify	Brendan Joyce	Matt Zauner	Clayton Ritter
Wollongong Hawks
1998	1	NBL	6th	30	14	16	.467	Lost elimination finals (Perth) 0–2	Brendan Joyce	Clayton Ritter	Clayton Ritter
1998–99	1	NBL	3rd	26	16	10	.615	Lost qualifying finals (Victoria) 0–2; Lost semifinals (Adelaide) 0–2	Brendan Joyce	Clayton Ritter	C. J. Bruton
1999–2000	1	NBL	7th	28	11	17	.393	Did not qualify	Brendan Joyce	Eric Cooks	Glen Saville; Melvin Thomas
2000–01	1	NBL	4th	28	21	7	.750	Won qualifying finals (Perth) 2–1; Won semifinals (Adelaide) 2–1; Won NBL finals (Townsville) 2–1	Brendan Joyce	Mat Campbell; Glen Saville	Glen Saville
2001–02	1	NBL	4th	30	16	14	.533	Lost qualifying finals (Adelaide) 0–2	Brendan Joyce	Mat Campbell; Glen Saville	Glen Saville
2002–03	1	NBL	4th	30	18	12	.600	Won qualifying finals (Townsville) 2–0; Lost semifinals (Perth) 0–2	Brendan Joyce	Mat Campbell; Glen Saville	Glen Saville
2003–04	1	NBL	2nd	33	25	8	.758	Lost semifinals (West Sydney) 0–2	Brendan Joyce	Mat Campbell	Glen Saville
2004–05	1	NBL	2nd	32	20	12	.625	Won semifinals (Townsville) 2–0; Lost NBL finals (Sydney) 0–3	Brendan Joyce	Mat Campbell	Glen Saville
2005–06	1	NBL	3rd	32	19	13	.594	Lost quarterfinal (Perth) 101–121	Brendan Joyce	Rotating captaincy	Cortez Groves
2006–07	1	NBL	9th	33	11	22	.333	Did not qualify	Brendan Joyce; Eric Cooks	Glen Saville	Adam Ballinger
2007–08	1	NBL	11th	30	9	21	.300	Did not qualify	Eric Cooks	Mat Campbell	Kavossy Franklin
2008–09	1	NBL	7th	30	11	19	.367	Did not qualify	Eric Cooks	Mat Campbell	Glen Saville
2009–10	1	NBL	2nd	28	16	12	.571	Won semifinals (Townsville) 2–1; Lost NBL finals (Perth) 1–2	Gordie McLeod	Mat Campbell	Larry Davidson
2010–11	1	NBL	5th	28	15	13	.536	Did not qualify	Gordie McLeod	Mat Campbell	Gary Ervin
2011–12	1	NBL	8th	28	9	19	.321	Did not qualify	Gordie McLeod	Mat Campbell	Oscar Forman
2012–13	1	NBL	3rd	28	13	15	.464	Lost semifinals (Perth) 0–2	Gordie McLeod	Oscar Forman	Adris Deleon
2013–14	1	NBL	4th	28	13	15	.464	Lost semifinals (Perth) 0–2	Gordie McLeod	Oscar Forman	Rotnei Clarke
2014–15	1	NBL	8th	28	6	22	.214	Did not qualify	Gordie McLeod	Oscar Forman	Tim Coenraad
Illawarra Hawks
2015–16	1	NBL	3rd	28	17	11	.607	Lost semifinals (Perth) 1–2	Rob Beveridge	Oscar Forman	Kevin Lisch
2016–17	1	NBL	4th	28	15	13	.536	Won semifinals (Adelaide) 2–1; Lost NBL finals (Perth) 0–3	Rob Beveridge	Oscar Forman	Rotnei Clarke
2017–18	1	NBL	5th	28	12	16	.429	Did not qualify	Rob Beveridge	Kevin White	Demitrius Conger
2018–19	1	NBL	7th	28	12	16	.429	Did not qualify	Rob Beveridge	Kevin White	Todd Blanchfield
2019–20	1	NBL	9th	28	5	23	.179	Did not qualify	Matt Flinn	David Andersen; Todd Blanchfield	Todd Blanchfield
2020–21	1	NBL	3rd	36	20	16	.556	Lost semifinals (Perth) 1–2	Brian Goorjian	Andrew Ogilvy	Tyler Harvey
2021–22	1	NBL	2nd	28	19	9	.679	Lost semifinals (Sydney) 0–2	Brian Goorjian	Andrew Ogilvy	Duop Reath
2022–23	1	NBL	10th	28	3	25	.107	Did not qualify	Jacob Jackomas	Sam Froling; Tyler Harvey	Sam Froling
2023–24	1	NBL	4th	28	14	14	.500	Lost seeding qualifier (Tasmania) 76–92; Won play-in game (New Zealand) 88–85; Lost semifinals (Melbourne) 1–2	Jacob Jackomas; Justin Tatum	Sam Froling; Tyler Harvey	Gary Clark
2024–25	1	NBL	1st	29	20	9	.690	Won semifinals (S.E. Melbourne) 2–1; Won NBL finals (Melbourne) 3–2	Justin Tatum	Sam Froling; Tyler Harvey	Sam Froling; Tyler Harvey; Trey Kell
2025–26	1	NBL	8th	33	13	20	.394	Did not qualify	Justin Tatum	Sam Froling; Tyler Harvey	JaVale McGee
Regular season record				1322	621	701	.470	1 regular season champions			
Finals record				82	28	54	.341	2 NBL championships			

As of the end of the 2025–26 season

*Note: In 1983 and 1984, the NBL was split into Eastern and Western divisions during the regular season.

== Honour roll ==
NBL Championships:	2 (2001, 2025)
NBL Regular Season Champions:	1 (2025)
NBL Finals Appearances:	24 (1984, 1986, 1987, 1993, 1992, 1993, 1994, 1995, 1998, 1999, 2001, 2002, 2003, 2004, 2005, 2006, 2010, 2013, 2014, 2016, 2017, 2021, 2022, 2024, 2025)
NBL Grand Final Appearances:	5 (2001, 2005, 2010, 2017, 2025)
NBL Most Valuable Player:	Mike Jones (1981), Gary Ervin (2011), Rotnei Clarke (2014), Kevin Lisch (2016)
NBL Grand Final MVP:	Glen Saville (2001)
NBL Coach of the Year:	David Lindstrom (1987), Alan Black (1993, 1995), Brendan Joyce (1999, 2001), Gordie McLeod (2010, 2014), Justin Tatum (2025)
NBL Rookie of the Year:	Greg Hubbard (1987), Justin Withers (1989), Axel Dench (2001), LaMelo Ball (2020)
NBL Next Generation Award:	Sam Froling (2024)
NBL Most Improved Player Award:	C. J. Bruton (1999), Cameron Tragardh (2008), Oscar Forman (2011), Sam Froling (2021)
NBL Best Defensive Player Award:	Glen Saville (2003), Darnell Mee (2005), Kevin Lisch (2016), Justin Simon (2021), Antonius Cleveland (2022)
NBL Best Sixth Man Award:	Adris Deleon (2013), Kevin Tiggs (2014), Rotnei Clarke (2017)
NBL Scoring leaders:	Mike Jones (1981, 1983), Cortez Groves (2006)
All-NBL First Team:	Doug Overton (1992), Melvin Thomas (1993), Darnell Mee (2005), Cortez Groves (2006), Tywain McKee (2010), Gary Ervin (2011), Rotnei Clarke (2014), Kevin Lisch (2016), Andrew Ogilvy (2016, 2017), Demitrius Conger (2018), Tyler Harvey (2021, 2025), Antonius Cleveland (2022), Gary Clark (2024), Trey Kell (2025)
All-NBL Second Team:	Butch Hays (1993), Melvin Thomas (1994, 1995), Clayton Ritter (1998), C.J. Bruton (1999), Glen Saville (2003, 2004, 2005, 2009, 2011), Cortez Groves (2007), Kirk Penney (2016), Sam Froling (2025)
All-NBL Third Team:	Melvin Thomas (1992, 2001), Butch Hays (1994), Glen Saville (2001, 2006, 2010), Cortez Groves (2003), Darnell Mee (2004), Adam Ballinger (2007), Kavossy Franklin (2008), Larry Davidson (2010), Cameron Tragardh (2010)

Source: NBL AWARD WINNERS

== Records and statistics ==
All-time records
Most games	527	Glen Saville
Most points	6865	Glen Saville
Most rebounds	4041	Glen Saville
Most assists	1847	Glen Saville
Most steals	776	Glen Saville
Most blocks	423	Glen Saville
Most field goals	2511	Glen Saville
Most 3-pointers	1049	Mat Campbell
Most free throws	1163	Glen Saville
Game records
Most points in a game	54	Norman Taylor, 18 May 1990
Most 3-pointers made in a game	10	Charles Thomas, 29 December 2001
Most assists in a game	18	Gordie McLeod, twice
Most blocks in a game	7	3 players
Most steals in a game	9	Elliot Hatcher, 13 March 1998
Most rebounds in a game	23	Ray Borner, 9 May 1987
Source: andthefoul.net
