= Adam Ballinger =

American-Australian basketball player

Personal information
- Born: 12 June 1979 (age 47) Bluffton, Indiana, U.S.
- Listed height: 205 cm (6 ft 9 in)
- Listed weight: 110 kg (243 lb)

Career information
- High school: Bluffton (Bluffton, Indiana)
- College: Michigan State (1998–2003)
- NBA draft: 2003: undrafted
- Playing career: 2003–2015
- Position: Power forward / Centre
- Number: 55, 54

Career history
- 2003–2004: Victoria Giants
- 2004–2007: Wollongong Hawks
- 2007: Gigantes de Carolina
- 2007–2012: Adelaide 36ers
- 2009: Waikato Pistons
- 2010: Ironi Nahariya
- 2012–2014: Melbourne Tigers
- 2014–2015: Wollongong Hawks
- 2015: Nunawading Spectres

Career highlights
- NZNBL champion (2009); NZNBL All-Star Five (2009); 3× All-NBL Second Team (2008–2010); 2× All-NBL Third Team (2007, 2011); NCAA champion (2000)

Adam Leon Ballinger (born June 12, 1979) is an American-Australian former professional basketball player who spent his entire career in the Australian National Basketball League, playing 12 seasons for various clubs such as the Victoria Giants, Wollongong Hawks, Adelaide 36ers and Melbourne Tigers. He also spent time in Puerto Rico, New Zealand and Israel during the Australian NBL off-seasons.

== College career ==
Ballinger committed to the Michigan State Spartans after a stellar prep career at Bluffton High School in Indiana, where he garnered Honorable Mention All-American honours his senior year. His freshman year, he redshirted after fracturing his fibula. He returned to play 37 games for the 2000 NCAA champion Spartans, including the Championship Game in which he scored on his only field goal attempt. Ballinger played in 25 games in his redshirt sophomore year as the Spartans went to the Final Four. Ballinger's junior year was his most successful campaign as he earned third team All-Big Ten media honours as well as Michigan State's Most Improved Player Award as he finished third in the conference in rebounding. In his 2002–03 senior season, he averaged 5.5 points per game. He also ranks 10th in MSU history with 53 career blocks.

During his senior year at Michigan State, Ballinger played in a game against touring Australian NBL team the Canberra Cannons. Starting at Power forward, during the game Ballinger's direct opponent was often Michigan State's greatest ever player, NBA legend with the Los Angeles Lakers and 2002 inductee into the Basketball Hall of Fame (and a native of Lansing where the school is located), Earvin "Magic" Johnson who joined the Cannons for their game at the Breslin Center. The Cannons also featured Ballinger's former Spartan teammate Mike Chappell who was recruited by Canberra in 2002.

== Professional career ==
Ballinger went undrafted in the 2003 NBA draft. In August 2003, Ballinger signed with the Victoria Giants of the Australian NBL for the 2003–04 season. He made an impact straight away in his first NBL season averaging 15.7 points per game. From 2004 to 2007, he played for the Wollongong Hawks, going on to play in the 2005 NBL Grand Final that season with the team. However, the Hawks went down to their rivals and defending league champion Sydney Kings without winning a game. Following the 2006–07 NBL season, he joined Gigantes de Carolina of Puerto Rico for the 2007 BSN season.

Ballinger signed with the Adelaide 36ers for the 2007–08 NBL season where he earned the first of four consecutive club MVP awards. He finished fourth in the NBL in scoring in 2008 with 22.5 points per game and finished fourth in the league MVP voting. Teaming with Adelaide's long time captain Brett Maher and former NBA player Luke Schenscher, Ballinger helped the 2008–09 36ers back to the NBL playoffs for the first time since 2005–06 where they were outed in the Elimination Final by the New Zealand Breakers 101–131 in Auckland.

Ballinger was appointed club captain of the Adelaide 36ers from the 2009–10 NBL season. In what was one of the worst 36ers season on record as the club won its first ever wooden spoon by finishing last with a 10–18 win–loss record which resulted in coach and former 36ers championship player Scott Ninnis being sacked. Ballinger himself had a very good season, leading the 36ers in scoring, blocked shots, finished second in team rebounding and won his third consecutive club MVP award. On February 14, 2010, he signed with Ironi Nahariya of Israel for the rest of the 2009–10 Ligat HaAl season.

The 2010–11 NBL season was almost a copy of the previous season with Ballinger leading the team in almost every offensive category despite the 36ers finishing with a 9–19 record. He averaged 15.3 points, 6.0 rebounds, 1.9 blocks and shoot 54.1% per game and was the 36ers leading scorer before injuring his ankle in the team's last home game of the season. With his 1.9 blocks per game, Ballinger was the leading shot blocker in the NBL during 2010–11, having rejected 50 shots in 26 games played. Ballinger was consistently Adelaide's leading player in 2010–11 and his form saw him finish third in the 2011 NBL MVP voting despite the 36ers finishing with a 9–19 record, the only time in their history the club has failed to win at least 10 games in an NBL season.

Due to the relatively small size of the 2010–11 36ers squad, the 205 cm tall Ballinger was used as the teams' starting centre until sustaining a season ending ankle injury on March 18, 2011. He did, however, revert to his more natural position of power forward when 6 ft 11 1/2 in (212.1 cm) tall teammate Daniel Johnson was on the court.

Ballinger's recovery from his ankle injury was a slow one and he played most of the 2011–12 NBL season from the bench for the 36ers who finished with a club worst 8–20 record and finished in last place for only the second time in their history.

At the end of 2011–12, Ballinger was a free agent and in May 2012, he signed with the Melbourne Tigers for the 2012–13 NBL season. On May 3, 2013, Ballinger re-signed with the Tigers on a two-year deal. On June 27, 2014, he was released by the club.

On July 20, 2014, Ballinger signed a one-year deal with the Wollongong Hawks, returning to the club for a second stint. On February 13, 2015, he announced his decision to retire from basketball following the conclusion of the 2014–15 NBL season. In his final NBL game on February 22, he started in place of Larry Davidson to record 9 points and 5 rebounds in 33 minutes of action, as the Hawks lost to Ballinger's former club, the Adelaide 36ers.

On 19 June 2015, Ballinger signed with the Nunawading Spectres for the rest of the 2015 SEABL season as an injury replacement for Simon Conn.

== International career ==
In July 2009, Ballinger became an Australian citizen. He was named to the Boomers squad for 2009 and trialled for the 2012 London Olympics squad.

== Personal ==
Ballinger and his Australian wife, Bianca, have three children together: Kia, Leon and Fletcher.

== NBL Honour roll ==
NBL career:	2003–2015
NBL Championships:	None
NBL Grand Final appearances:	1 (2004/05)
NBL Finals appearances:	5 (2004/05, 2005/06, 2008/09, 2012/13, 2013/14)
All NBL Second Team:	2 (2008/09, 2009/10)
All NBL Third Team:	2 (2006/07, 2010/11)

== NBL career stats ==
Games:	340 (33 Vic, 130 Wol, 121 Ade, 56 Mel)
Rebounds:	6.3 pg
Points:	15.2 pg
Free Throws:	578 / 731 (79.1%)
Field goals:	2,118 / 4,140 (51.2%)
3 Points:	364 / 972 (37.4%)
Steals:	0.4 pg
Assists:	1.1 pg
Blocks:	1.2 pg
