= Melvin Thomas =

American basketball player

Personal information
- Born: February 25, 1968 (age 58) Alabama, United States
- Listed height: 200 cm (6 ft 7 in)
- Listed weight: 98 kg (216 lb)

Career information
- College: Texas-Pan American (1987–1990)
- NBA draft: 1990: undrafted
- Playing career: 1992–2006
- Position: Forward / center

Career history
- 1992–1995: Illawarra Hawks
- 1996–1997: Sydney Kings
- 1998–1999: Canberra Cannons
- 1999–2003: Wollongong Hawks
- 2003–2006: Cairns Taipans

Career highlights
- NBL champion (2001); All-NBL First Team (1993); 2× All-NBL Second Team (1994, 1995); 4× All-NBL Third Team (1992, 1996, 1999, 2001); Second-team All-ASC (1990); Third-team All-ASC (1989); No. 33 retired by Illawarra Hawks

Melvin Thomas (born February 25, 1968) is an American former professional basketball player who played 15 seasons in the National Basketball League (NBL) in Australia between 1992 and 2006.

== Early life ==
Thomas was born in the U.S. state of Alabama.

== College career ==
Thomas played college basketball at the University of Texas–Pan American for the Texas–Pan American Broncs between 1987 and 1990. He earned All-American South Conference Third Team honors in 1988–98 and All-American South Conference Second Team honors in 1989–90. He was also the UTPA Male Student-Athlete of the Year for 1989–90, and in December 1989, he was named the Jowers Jamboree tournament MVP.

Thomas amassed 1,306 points in three seasons and as of 2022, his total ranks ninth all time in school history.

== Professional career ==
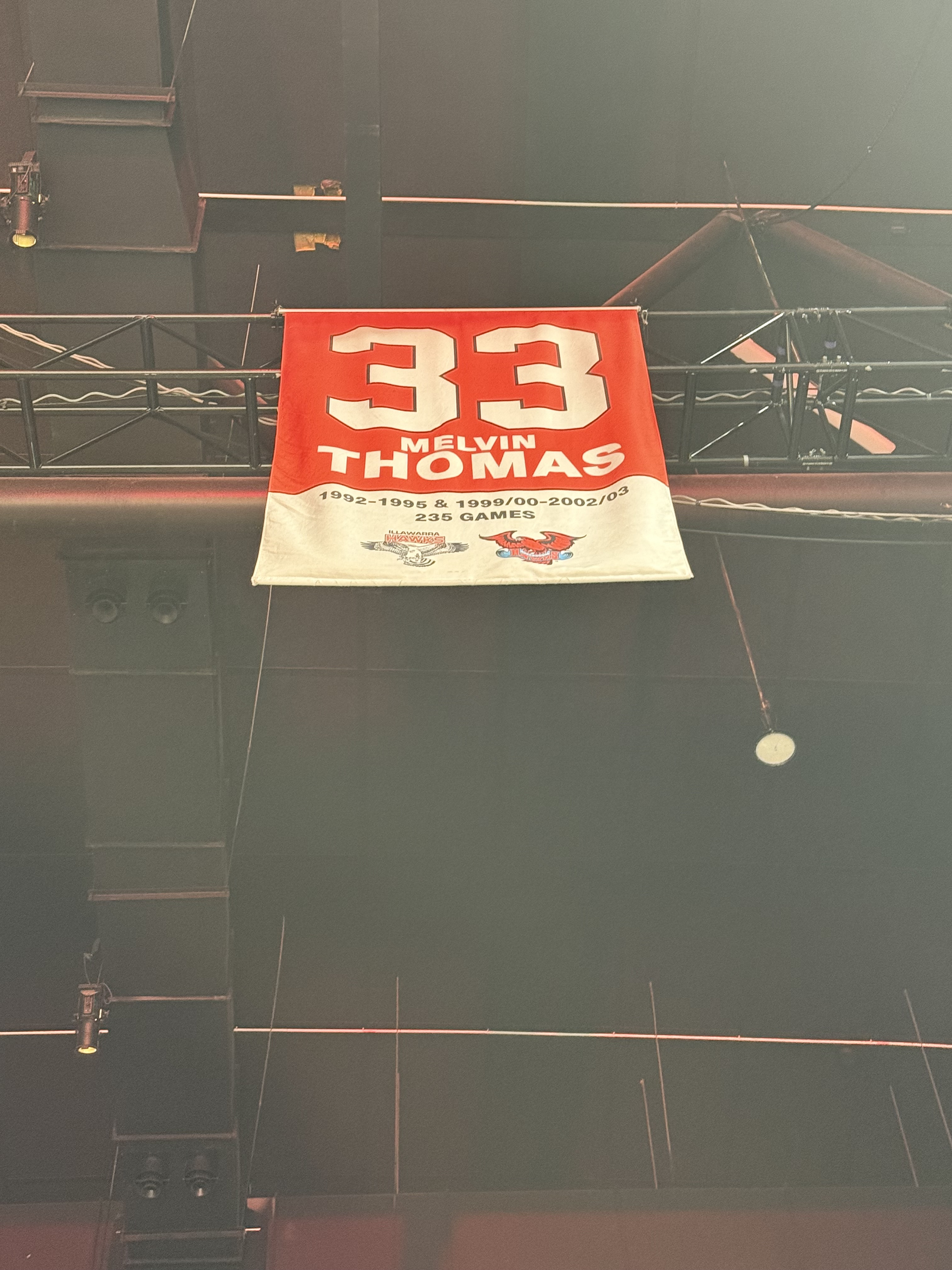
Thomas' retired jersey number hanging at WIN Entertainment Centre, December 2025

Thomas made his debut in the Australian National Basketball League (NBL) in 1992 with the Illawarra Hawks. Alongside Doug Overton, the pair were one of the Hawks' all-time greatest import duos.

Thomas played four seasons for the Hawks before joining the Sydney Kings in 1996. After two seasons for the Kings, he played for the Canberra Cannons in the 1998 NBL season and 1998–99 NBL season. He returned to the Hawks, now known as Wollongong, for the 1999–2000 season. In the 2000–01 season, he averaged a team-high 18.8 points to lead the Hawks to the NBL championship.

After another four seasons with the Hawks, Thomas joined the Cairns Taipans for the 2003–04 NBL season. On December 31, 2003, in a game against the Brisbane Bullets, Thomas suffered a season-ending achilles injury. He returned to the Taipans for the 2004–05 season and played his final NBL season with the Taipans in 2005–06.

Thomas was named to the All-NBL Team seven times, including first team in 1993; second team in 1994 and 1995; and third team in 1992, 1996, 1999, and 2001.

In October 2013, the Illawarra Hawks retired his number 33 jersey.

== Personal life ==
Thomas and his wife have a son named Noah. Noah grew up in Australia and played college basketball in the United States.

In February 2003, Thomas' brother died after being shot at his home in Detroit.

As of October 2013, Thomas was working as a Qantas baggage handler in Sydney.
