= Gordon McLeod (basketball) =

Australian basketball player

Personal information
- Born: November 7, 1956 (age 70) Wollongong, New South Wales, Australia
- Listed height: 173 cm (5 ft 8 in)
- Listed weight: 70 kg (154 lb)

Career information
- Playing career: 1979–1991
- Position: Point guard
- Coaching career: 1998–2016

Career history

Playing
- 1979–1982: Illawarra Hawks
- 1983: Sydney SuperSonics
- 1984–1988: Illawarra Hawks
- 1989–1990: Hobart Tassie Devils
- 1991: Brisbane Bullets

Coaching
- 1998–2004: West Sydney Razorbacks
- 2006–2008: Singapore Slingers
- 2009–2015: Wollongong Hawks
- 2015–2016: Cairns Taipans (assistant)

Career highlights
- As head coach: 2× NBL Coach of the Year (2010, 2014)

Gordon Livingstone "Gordie" McLeod (born 7 November 1956) is an Australian former professional basketball player and coach in the National Basketball League (NBL).

== Professional career ==
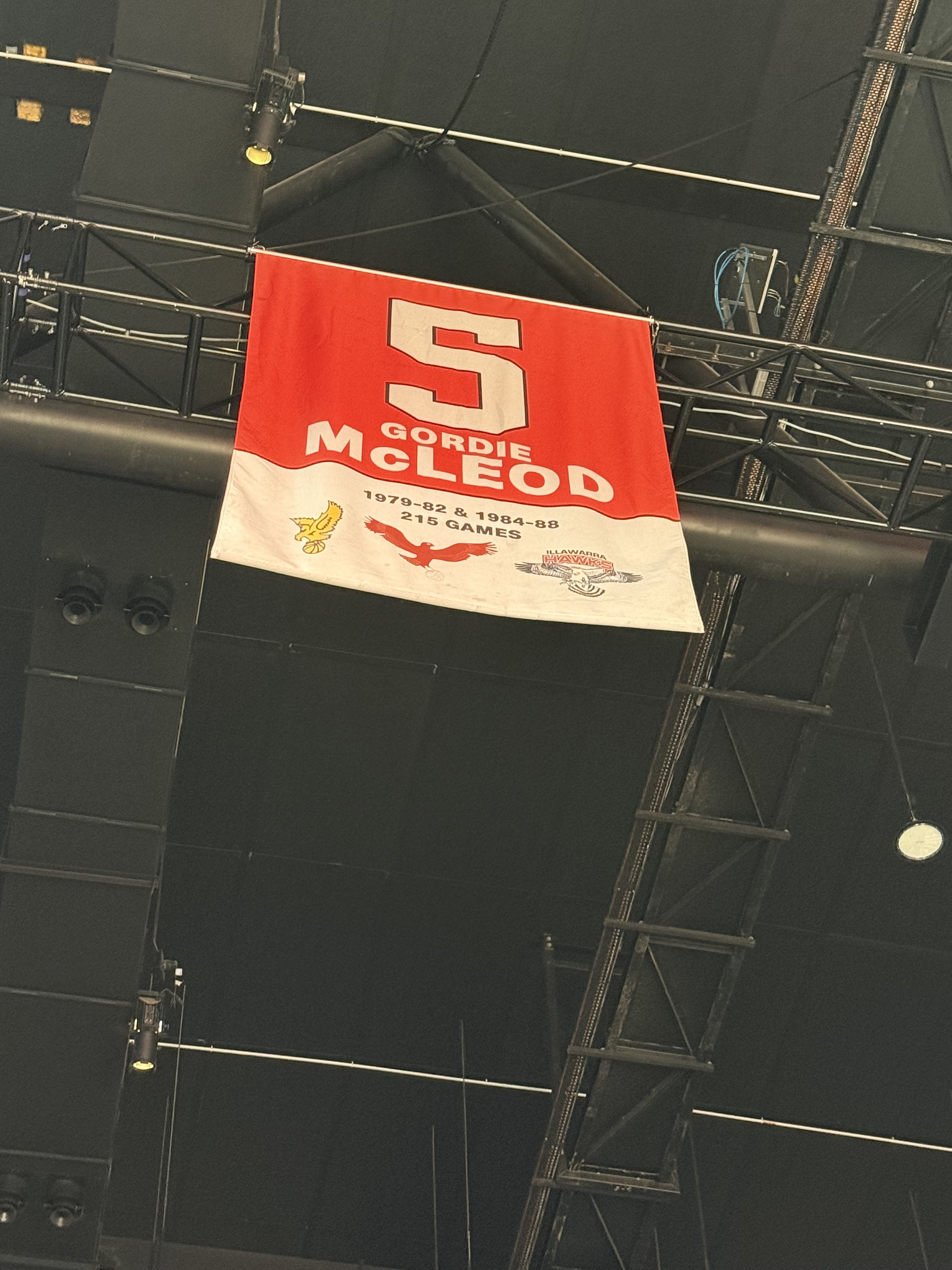
McLeod's retired jersey number hanging at WIN Entertainment Centre, December 2025

McLeod was already known as one of Australia's more talented point guards when the new NBL started in 1979. He joined his home town team the Illawarra Hawks for the inaugural season playing 17 games and averaging 10.1 points per game.

McLeod was appointed captain of the Hawks and would continue to lead the team until the end of the 1982 season. After 82 games in the red and white of Illawarra he would sign with the Sydney SuperSonics for 1983. After just one season in Sydney, McLeod would re-join the Hawks from 1984, regaining the club captaincy. His return helped the Hawks make the NBL playoffs for the first time in the club's history. The team lost the Elimination Final 101–108 to the Newcastle Falcons. McLeod had a career best 15.8 points per game during the 1984 NBL season.

The Hawks missed the finals in 1985 but the club made it as far as the semi-finals in 1986 where they lost to eventual champions Adelaide and again in 1987 where they lost a three-game series again to the eventual league champions, the Brisbane Bullets. McLeods own form saw him score 9.1 points per game in 1986 and 12.4 points per game in 1987.

Following the 1988 season, McLeod again left the Illawarra Hawks, this time joining the Hobart Devils. He would play two seasons with the struggling Devils before joining 1990 NBL grand finalist Brisbane for the 1991 season. After the Bullets failed to repeat their 1990 form and failed to make the NBL finals, McLeod retired from playing professional basketball at the age of 34.

== International career ==
McLeod played for the Australian Boomers at the 1978 FIBA World Championship in the Philippines, helping the team to a then best 7th place. He also represented the Boomers at the 1980 Summer Olympics in Moscow where the team finished in 8th position despite the boycott of the games by the gold medal favourite United States.

== Coaching career ==
McLeod started his NBL coaching career with a 2-game stint as player-coach for the Cascade Tassie Devils in 1989 before becoming the first head coach of the West Sydney Razorbacks in 1998. He would lead the team to the 2002 NBL grand final series against the Adelaide 36ers though the Razorbacks would lose the three game series one game to two. He would lead the Razorbacks to a second NBL grand final in the 2003–04 NBL season. In the first ever five game series the Razorbacks would lose to their cross-town rivals the Sydney Kings 2–3 in a close series. After leading by as much as 17 points in the 3rd period and 79–72 with only 3:10 left in the deciding Game 5, the 'Pigs' were overrun by a suddenly red-hot Kings team who scored the last 18 points of the game to win 90–79.

Despite leading them to the Grand Final in 2004, McLeod was not retained by the Razorbacks for the 2004–05 NBL season. He would sign to be the head coach of the league's new Singapore Slingers team for the 2006–07 NBL season, leading them to the NBL playoffs in their first year in the league.

After the Slingers withdrew from the NBL following the 2007–08 season, McLeod was appointed as assistant coach of the Aussie Boomers squad for the 2008 Summer Olympics in Beijing where they finished in 7th place with a 3–3 record.

McLeod re-joined the Wollongong Hawks as head coach for the 2009–10 NBL season, leading the team to a second place regular season finish with a 16–12 record. The Hawks fought their way into their third NBL grand final where they lost one game to two to the Perth Wildcats. McLeod was rewarded for his coaching efforts during the season as he won his first NBL Coach of the Year award.

The Hawks had an injury hit season in 2010–11 and they just missed the playoffs despite a 15–13 record. McLeod finished the year with a career NBL coaching record of 149–173, moving him to 14th in all time coaching career wins.

In June 2014, McLeod re-signed as head coach of the Hawks for a further three years. However, in June 2015, he was released from his contract. The following month, McLeod was hired by the Cairns Taipans as an assistant coach for the 2015–16 season.
