= Mat Campbell =

Australian basketball player

Personal information
- Born: 20 June 1976 (age 50) Bendigo, Victoria
- Listed height: 196 cm (6 ft 5 in)
- Listed weight: 84 kg (185 lb)

Career information
- Playing career: 1996–2012
- Position: Shooting guard / small forward

Career history
- 1996–2012: Illawarra / Wollongong Hawks

Career highlights
- NBL champion (2001); No. 32 retired by Illawarra Hawks

Mathew David Campbell (born 20 June 1976) is an Australian former professional basketball player who played his entire career for the Wollongong Hawks of the National Basketball League (NBL).

== NBL career ==
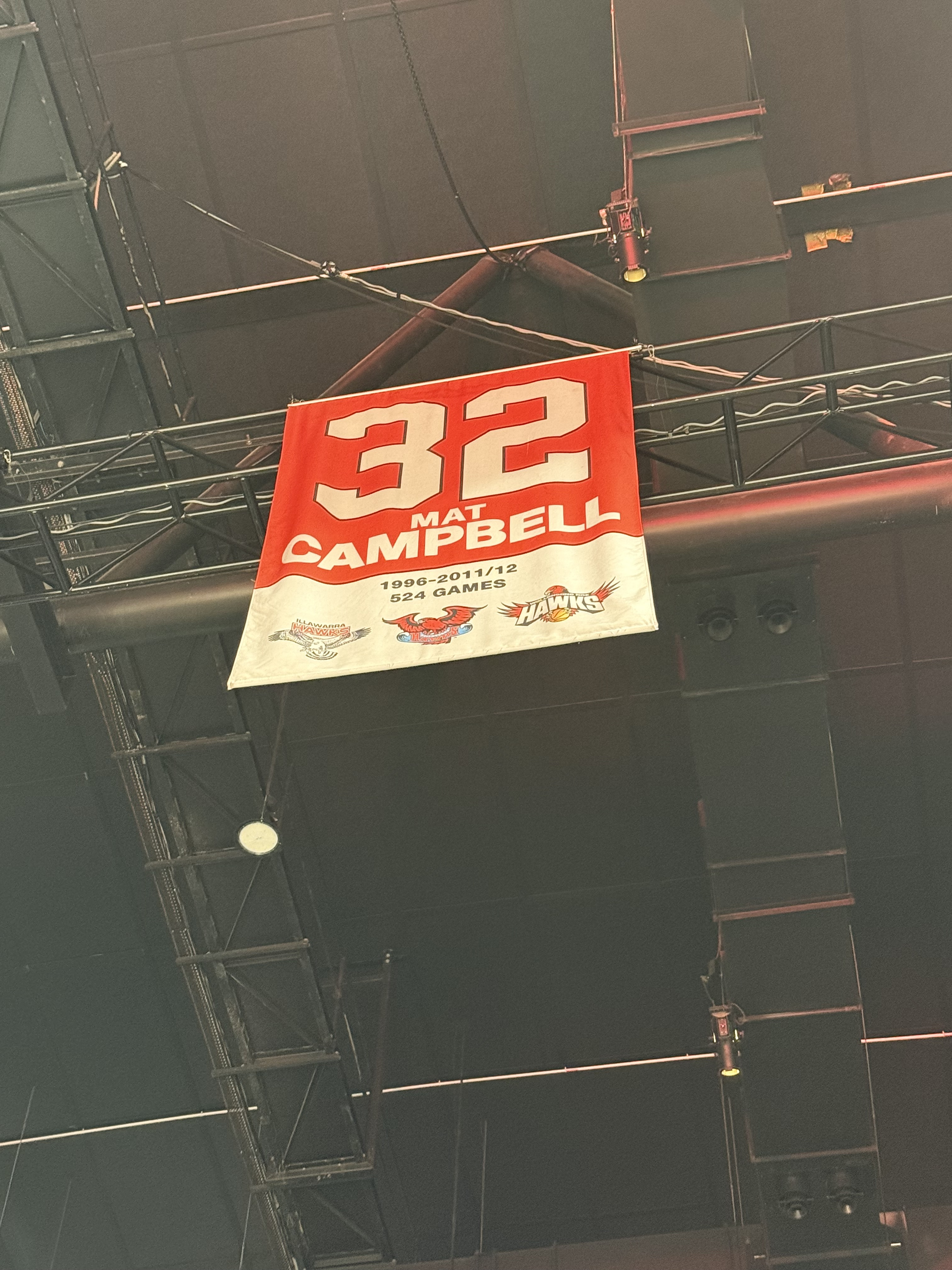
Campbell's retired jersey number hanging at WIN Entertainment Centre, December 2025

Born in Bendigo, Victoria, Campbell joined the Illawarra Hawks in 1996, and remained with the club for 17 seasons. In his rookie season, he played in the NBL's Future Forces Game. In 1999, he finished third in voting for the NBL Best Defensive Player Award, and the following season, became the captain of the Hawks. He and long-time teammate Glen Saville helped the Hawks win their maiden NBL championship in 2001 and finish runners-up in 2005. He scored a career-best 36 points against the Townsville Crocodiles in Townsville on 5 December 2005, including 9-of-14 from three-pointer range.

Campbell led the "Save the Hawks" campaign in February 2009 to ensure Wollongong's further participation in the NBL. He helped the team raise significant funds as well as obtaining a $1 million guarantee from Gujarat NRE and gaining Australian Health Management as their naming rights sponsor.

In 2009, Campbell had his iconic No. 32 singlet retired by the Hawks. He is one of only five Illawarra/Wollongong players to have had their jersey retired.

On 15 March 2012, Campbell announced his retirement from professional basketball. He completed his 17-year NBL career as the Hawks' all-time games played leader with 524 (Glen Saville surpassed that record during the 2012–13 season), and the club's three-pointers made leader with 1,049. In 524 career games, he averaged 11.7 points, 2.9 rebounds and 2.0 assists per game.

== National team career ==
Campbell was a member of the Under 23 Australian squad in 1996, and played for the Australian team during their tours to China and Europe in 2002. Two years later, he trialled for the Boomers to compete in the 2004 Athens Olympic Games, but was cut from the squad ahead of the games.

== Post-playing career ==
After retiring, Campbell worked for six years in the mining sector.

On 5 April 2018, Campbell was appointed general manager of the Illawarra Hawks. He remained in the role as of February 2024.
