= Cortez Groves =

American basketball player (born 1978)

Personal information
- Born: March 25, 1978 (age 48) Raytown, Missouri, U.S.
- Listed height: 196 cm (6 ft 5 in)
- Listed weight: 86 kg (190 lb)

Career information
- High school: Raytown (Raytown, Missouri)
- College: Moberly Area CC (1996–1998); Kansas State (1998–2000)
- NBA draft: 2000: undrafted
- Playing career: 2000–2011
- Position: Guard

Career history
- 2000–2001: Salina Rattlers
- 2001–2002: Aix Maurienne Savoie Basket
- 2002–2003: Wollongong Hawks
- 2003–2004: Kansas City Knights
- 2004–2005: Atenas de Córdoba
- 2005–2007: Wollongong Hawks
- 2007–2008: South Dragons
- 2009–2010: Adelaide 36ers
- 2011: Brisbane Spartans

Career highlights
- All-NBL First Team (2006); All-NBL Second Team (2007); All-NBL Third Team (2003); NBL scoring champion (2006); Big 12 Newcomer Team (1999)

Cortez Lamont Groves (born March 25, 1978) is an American former professional basketball player who is best known for his time spent in the Australian National Basketball League (NBL).

After two years at Kansas State, Groves played in the International Basketball Association for the Salina Rattlers during the 2000–01 season. He finished the season in France with Aix Maurienne Savoie Basket, and then returned to the team for the first half of the 2001–02 season.

For the 2002–03 season, Groves moved to Australia to play for the Wollongong Hawks. After a stint in the ABA with the Kansas City Knights during the 2003–04 season, Groves moved to Argentina for the 2004–05 season, where he played for Atenas de Córdoba. He returned to Australia for the 2005–06 season, re-joining the Wollongong Hawks. He continued on with the Hawks for the 2006–07 season and then joined the South Dragons for the 2007–08 season. He returned to the Dragons for a second season, but he was cut in December 2008 due to injury. He returned to Australia for the 2009–10 season to play for the Adelaide 36ers.

Groves had his final professional stint in 2011, playing for the Brisbane Spartans in the SEABL.
