= Glen Saville =

Australian basketball player (b.1976)

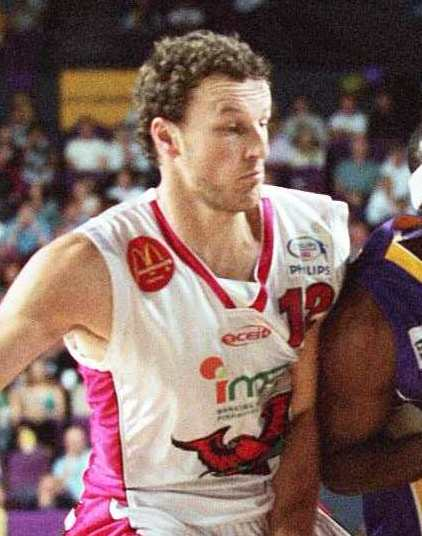
- Saville with the Wollongong Hawks, c. 2004

Personal information
- Born: 17 January 1976 (age 50) Bendigo, Victoria
- Listed height: 197 cm (6 ft 6 in)
- Listed weight: 97 kg (214 lb)

Career information
- Playing career: 1995–2013
- Position: Small forward / shooting guard

Career history
- 1995–2007: Illawarra / Wollongong Hawks
- 2007–2008: Sydney Kings
- 2008–2013: Wollongong Hawks

Career highlights
- NBL champion (2001); NBL Grand Final MVP (2001); NBL Best Defensive Player (2003); 5× All-NBL Second Team (2003–2005, 2009, 2011); 3× All-NBL Third Team (2001, 2006, 2010); No. 12 retired by Illawarra Hawks

Glen Saville (born 17 January 1976) is an Australian former professional basketball player who played the majority of his career for the Wollongong Hawks of the National Basketball League (NBL).

== NBL career ==
Born in Bendigo, Victoria, Saville moved to Canberra in 1993 to attend the Australian Institute of Sport on a two-year basketball scholarship. In 1995, he competed for Australia at FIBA Under-19 World Championship where he helped the team finish second. That same year, he debuted in the National Basketball League for the Illawarra Hawks. Saville set the league alight early on in his career with his versatility and athletic style of play, quickly becoming a Hawks fan favourite.

In 1996, Saville played in the NBL's Future Forces Game, and went on to play in the 1997 NBL All-Star Game. Between 2000 and 2003, Saville was the Hawks' co-captain alongside Mat Campbell, and he won the Hawks team MVP in 2000, 2001, 2003, 2004 and 2005. In 2001, he guided the Hawks to their maiden NBL championship, as Saville earned Grand Final MVP honors. In 2003, he won the NBL Best Defensive Player Award and finished third overall in the voting for the NBL Most Valuable Player Award. The following year, he finished fourth in MVP voting.

Saville had a career-best season in 2004–05, as he was a key factor in the Hawks push to the Grand Final, averaging a career-high 17.8 points per game during the regular season, as well as 9.4 rebounds and 3.8 assists. He subsequently finished fifth in 2005 NBL MVP voting.

For the 2007–08 season, Saville joined the Sydney Kings. He helped the Kings reach the 2008 Grand Final where they were defeated 3–2 by the Melbourne Tigers in the best-of-five series.

After the Kings folded following the 2007–08 season, Saville returned to Wollongong for the 2008–09 season. He was fourth in the NBL in defensive rebounds, tenth in total rebounds, and fifth in steals in 2008–09.

In 2009, Saville had his iconic No. 12 singlet retired by the Hawks. He is one of only five Illawarra/Wollongong players to have had their jersey retired.

On 31 January 2013, Saville announced his retirement from professional basketball after sustaining a season-ending knee injury. He completed his career as the all-time games record-holder for the Hawks (527), and fourth all-time in the NBL (563) – with only Tony Ronaldson, Andrew Gaze and Leroy Loggins to have played more.

In 563 NBL games, Saville averaged 12.9 points, 7.6 rebounds and 3.5 assists per game.

== National team career ==
Saville played for Australia at the East Asian and Goodwill Games 2001, and on the tours to China and Europe in 2002. He excelled on the international stage, representing the Boomers at the 2004 Athens Olympic Games and 2008 Beijing Olympic Games. He was selected for the 2006 Commonwealth Games but missed through injury.
