= 2008–09 NBL season =

Professional basketball season

- League: National Basketball League
- Season: 2008–09
- Dates: 13 September 2008 – 13 March 2009
- Teams: 10
- TV partners: Australia: Fox Sports; New Zealand: Māori Television

Regular season
- Season champions: South Dragons
- Season MVP: Kirk Penney (New Zealand)

Finals
- Champions: South Dragons (1st title)
- Runners-up: Melbourne Tigers
- Semi-finalists: New Zealand Breakers; Townsville Crocodiles
- Finals MVP: (United States) Donta Smith (South)

Statistical leaders
| Points | Kirk Penney (New Zealand) | 24.1 |
| Rebounds | (Australia) Luke Schenscher (Adelaide) | 10.8 |
| Assists | (Australia) Shane Heal (Gold Coast) | 5.7 |

NBL seasons
- ← 2007–08 2009–10 →

The 2008–09 NBL season was the 31st season of competition since its establishment in 1979. A total of 10 teams contested the league.

== 2008–09 league participants ==
| Team | Region | CEO | Coach | Home ground | Capacity |
|---|---|---|---|---|---|
| Adelaide 36ers | SA | Mal Hemmerling | Scott Ninnis | Distinctive Homes Dome | 8,000 |
| Cairns Taipans | QLD | Denis Keeffe | Mark Beecroft | Cairns Convention Centre | 5,300 |
| Gold Coast Blaze | QLD | David Claxton | Brendan Joyce | Gold Coast Convention & Exhibition Centre | 5,269 |
| Melbourne Tigers | VIC | Seamus McPeake | Alan Westover | State Netball Centre | 3,500 |
| New Zealand Breakers | NZL | Richard Clarke | Andrej Lemanis | North Shore Events Centre | 4,400 |
| Perth Wildcats | WA | Nick Marvin | Conner Henry | Challenge Stadium | 4,500 |
| South Dragons | VIC | Ryan Gardiner | Brian Goorjian | Hisense Arena | 10,500 |
| Sydney Spirit | NSW | Steve Aquilina | Rob Beveridge | State Sports Centre | 5,006 |
| Townsville Crocodiles | QLD | Ian Smythe | Trevor Gleeson | Townsville Entertainment Centre | 5,257 |
| Wollongong Hawks | NSW | TBD | Eric Cooks | WIN Entertainment Centre | 6,000 |

- On 30 June 2008 the Brisbane Bullets confirmed they would be handing back the team's license to the NBL. The NBL confirmed there will be no Brisbane team participating in the 2008/09 season.
- On 2 July 2008 the NBL announced that two bids for the Sydney Kings license had failed and that there would be no second Sydney team in the 2008/09 season.
- On 29 July 2008 the Singapore Slingers announced that they had decided to withdraw from the competition permanently due to the dramatic increase in international travel costs.

== Sponsors ==
| Team | Major sponsor |
|---|---|
| Adelaide 36ers | Sprint Auto Parts |
| Cairns Taipans | Skytrans Airlines |
| Gold Coast Blaze | QDeck |
| Melbourne Tigers | OAMPS Insurance Brokers |
| New Zealand Breakers | Bartercard |
| Perth Wildcats | Saville Australia |
| South Dragons | Crazy John's |
| Townsville Crocodiles | McDonald's |
| West Sydney Razorbacks | Westbus |
| Wollongong Hawks | Australian Health Management |

== Apparel ==
| Team | Provider | Home colour | Away colour |
|---|---|---|---|
| Adelaide 36ers | Adidas | Blue | Yellow |
| Cairns Taipans | Kombat | Orange | White |
| Gold Coast Blaze | G2 Game Gear | Sky Blue | White |
| Melbourne Tigers | Kombat | Red | Yellow |
| New Zealand Breakers | SAS Sports | Black | White |
| Perth Wildcats | Hoop 2 Hoop | Red | White |
| South Dragons | Kombat | Black | White |
| Townsville Crocodiles | Kombat | Green | White |
| Sydney Spirit | Blades | Blue | White |
| Wollongong Hawks | G2 Game Gear | Red | White |

== Regular season ==
The 2008-09 regular season took place over 22 rounds between 13 September 2008 and 14 February 2009.

=== Round 1 ===
| Date | Home | Score | Away | Venue | Crowd | Boxscore |
|---|---|---|---|---|---|---|
| 13/09/2008 | Cairns Taipans | 98–92 | South Dragons | Cairns Convention Centre | 3,830 | boxscore |
| 14/09/2008 | Sydney Spirit | 102–112 | Melbourne Tigers | State Sports Centre | 1,573 | boxscore |
| 17/09/2008 | South Dragons | 97–81 | Perth Wildcats | Hisense Arena | 3,202 | boxscore |
| 18/09/2008 | New Zealand Breakers | 114–93 | Wollongong Hawks | North Shore Events Centre | 3,492 | boxscore |
| 19/09/2008 | Adelaide 36ers | 109–82 | Townsville Crocodiles | Adelaide Arena | 4,749 | boxscore |
| 19/09/2008 | Gold Coast Blaze | 75–85 | Cairns Taipans | Gold Coast Convention Centre | 3,031 | boxscore |
| 20/09/2008 | Melbourne Tigers | 92–76 | Gold Coast Blaze | State Netball and Hockey Centre | 2,497 | boxscore |
| 20/09/2008 | Wollongong Hawks | 111–99 | Sydney Spirit | WIN Entertainment Centre | 2,834 | boxscore |
| 21/09/2008 | Perth Wildcats | 87–91 | South Dragons | Challenge Stadium | 4,400 | boxscore |

=== Round 2 ===
| Date | Home | Score | Away | Venue | Crowd | Boxscore |
|---|---|---|---|---|---|---|
| 24/09/2008 | Adelaide 36ers | 99–89 | Sydney Spirit | Adelaide Arena | 4,010 | boxscore |
| 25/09/2008 | New Zealand Breakers | 120–111 | Melbourne Tigers | North Shore Events Centre | 3,751 | boxscore |
| 25/09/2008 | South Dragons | 89–91 | Townsville Crocodiles | Hisense Arena | 3,413 | boxscore |
| 26/09/2008 | Perth Wildcats | 94–80 | Gold Coast Blaze | Challenge Stadium | 4,000 | boxscore |
| 27/09/2008 | Sydney Spirit | 112–105 | Adelaide 36ers | AIS Arena | 1,322 | boxscore |
| 27/09/2008 | Townsville Crocodiles | 100–96 | Cairns Taipans | Townsville Entertainment Centre | 4,511 | boxscore |

=== Round 3 ===
| Date | Home | Score | Away | Venue | Crowd | Boxscore |
|---|---|---|---|---|---|---|
| 1/10/2008 | Perth Wildcats | 105–92 | Wollongong Hawks | Challenge Stadium | 4,200 | boxscore |
| 2/10/2008 | New Zealand Breakers | 118–80 | Adelaide 36ers | North Shore Events Centre | 3,200 | boxscore |
| 2/10/2008 | Gold Coast Blaze | 90–107 | South Dragons | Gold Coast Convention Centre | 2,786 | boxscore |
| 3/10/2008 | Cairns Taipans | 77–101 | Melbourne Tigers | Cairns Convention Centre | 3,969 | boxscore |
| 4/10/2008 | Wollongong Hawks | 95–114 | South Dragons | WIN Entertainment Centre | 2,516 | boxscore |
| 4/10/2008 | Townsville Crocodiles | 97–80 | Perth Wildcats | Townsville Entertainment Centre | 4,184 | boxscore |

=== Round 4 ===
| Date | Home | Score | Away | Venue | Crowd | Boxscore |
|---|---|---|---|---|---|---|
| 8/10/2008 | Melbourne Tigers | 101–105 | Perth Wildcats | State Netball and Hockey Centre | 2,074 | boxscore |
| 9/10/2008 | New Zealand Breakers | 111–122 | Cairns Taipans | North Shore Events Centre | 4,066 | boxscore |
| 10/10/2008 | Wollongong Hawks | 85–82 | Perth Wildcats | WIN Entertainment Centre | 2,338 | boxscore |
| 10/10/2008 | Gold Coast Blaze | 92–98 | Sydney Spirit | Gold Coast Convention Centre | 3,091 | boxscore |
| 11/10/2008 | Melbourne Tigers | 119–91 | Adelaide 36ers | State Netball and Hockey Centre | 2,636 | boxscore |
| 11/10/2008 | Sydney Spirit | 101–86 | Perth Wildcats | State Sports Centre | 1,624 | boxscore |

=== Round 5 ===
| Date | Home | Score | Away | Venue | Crowd | Boxscore |
|---|---|---|---|---|---|---|
| 15/10/2008 | Perth Wildcats | 89–77 | Wollongong Hawks | Challenge Stadium | 3,800 | boxscore |
| 16/10/2008 | New Zealand Breakers | 120–108 | Gold Coast Blaze | North Shore Events Centre | 3,500 | boxscore |
| 17/10/2008 | Wollongong Hawks | 105–95 | Adelaide 36ers | WIN Entertainment Centre | 2,329 | boxscore |
| 17/10/2008 | Sydney Spirit | 101–106 | South Dragons | Sydney Entertainment Centre | 1,476 | boxscore |
| 17/10/2008 | Townsville Crocodiles | 93–107 | Perth Wildcats | Townsville Entertainment Centre | 4,274 | boxscore |
| 18/10/2008 | South Dragons | 108–80 | Melbourne Tigers | Hisense Arena | 9,308 | boxscore |
| 18/10/2008 | Cairns Taipans | 102–87 | Gold Coast Blaze | Cairns Convention Centre | 4,368 | boxscore |

=== Round 6 ===
| Date | Home | Score | Away | Venue | Crowd | Boxscore |
|---|---|---|---|---|---|---|
| 22/10/2008 | Townsville Crocodiles | 103–101 | Sydney Spirit | Townsville Entertainment Centre | 3,858 | boxscore |
| 22/10/2008 | Cairns Taipans | 101–92 | New Zealand Breakers | Cairns Convention Centre | 3,258 | boxscore |
| 24/10/2008 | Wollongong Hawks | 98–96 | Gold Coast Blaze | WIN Entertainment Centre | 2,646 | boxscore |
| 25/10/2008 | Melbourne Tigers | 110–97 | Townsville Crocodiles | State Netball and Hockey Centre | 2,780 | boxscore |
| 25/10/2008 | South Dragons | 94–65 | Cairns Taipans | Hisense Arena | 4,200 | boxscore |
| 25/10/2008 | Gold Coast Blaze | 113–116 | New Zealand Breakers | Gold Coast Convention Centre | 3,269 | boxscore |
| 25/10/2008 | Adelaide 36ers | 93–104 | Perth Wildcats | Adelaide Arena | 5,238 | boxscore |
| 26/10/2008 | Sydney Spirit | 99–86 | Wollongong Hawks | State Sports Centre | 1,350 | boxscore |

=== Round 7 ===
| Date | Home | Score | Away | Venue | Crowd | Boxscore |
|---|---|---|---|---|---|---|
| 29/10/2008 | Wollongong Hawks | 101–93 | Cairns Taipans | WIN Entertainment Centre | 1,877 | boxscore |
| 30/10/2008 | New Zealand Breakers | 103–99 | Perth Wildcats | North Shore Events Centre | 3,532 | boxscore |
| 1/11/2008 | South Dragons | 96–87 | Sydney Spirit | Hisense Arena | 3,851 | boxscore |
| 1/11/2008 | Melbourne Tigers | 123–111 | Gold Coast Blaze | State Netball and Hockey Centre | 2,074 | boxscore |
| 1/11/2008 | Cairns Taipans | 87–89 | Wollongong Hawks | Cairns Convention Centre | 3,390 | boxscore |
| 1/11/2008 | Townsville Crocodiles | 97–106 | New Zealand Breakers | Townsville Entertainment Centre | 4,212 | boxscore |
| 2/11/2008 | Adelaide 36ers | 108–76 | Sydney Spirit | Adelaide Arena | 3,890 | boxscore |

=== Round 8 ===
| Date | Home | Score | Away | Venue | Crowd | Boxscore |
|---|---|---|---|---|---|---|
| 5/11/2008 | Gold Coast Blaze | 115–106 | Townsville Crocodiles | Gold Coast Convention Centre | 2,388 | boxscore |
| 6/11/2008 | New Zealand Breakers | 86–96 | Adelaide 36ers | North Shore Events Centre | 2,974 | boxscore |
| 7/11/2008 | Sydney Spirit | 80–98 | Melbourne Tigers | State Sports Centre | 1,680 | boxscore |
| 8/11/2008 | Melbourne Tigers | 84–86 | New Zealand Breakers | State Netball and Hockey Centre | 3,387 | boxscore |
| 8/11/2008 | South Dragons | 95–83 | Gold Coast Blaze | Hisense Arena | 3,812 | boxscore |
| 8/11/2008 | Adelaide 36ers | 70–71 | Cairns Taipans | Adelaide Arena | 4,565 | boxscore |
| 8/11/2008 | Perth Wildcats | 115–78 | Townsville Crocodiles | Challenge Stadium | 4,223 | boxscore |

=== Round 9 ===
| Date | Home | Score | Away | Venue | Crowd | Boxscore |
|---|---|---|---|---|---|---|
| 12/11/2008 | South Dragons | 97–82 | Adelaide 36ers | Hisense Arena | 3,318 | boxscore |
| 12/11/2008 | Sydney Spirit | 115–93 | Gold Coast Blaze | State Sports Centre | 1,430 | boxscore |
| 12/11/2008 | Cairns Taipans | 81–93 | New Zealand Breakers | Cairns Convention Centre | 3,243 | boxscore |
| 14/11/2008 | Wollongong Hawks | 110–111 | Gold Coast Blaze | WIN Entertainment Centre | 2,585 | boxscore |
| 15/11/2008 | Townsville Crocodiles | 108–119 | New Zealand Breakers | Townsville Entertainment Centre | 4,152 | boxscore |
| 15/11/2008 | Perth Wildcats | 86–78 | Cairns Taipans | Challenge Stadium | 4,200 | boxscore |
| 16/11/2008 | Gold Coast Blaze | 96–108 | Adelaide 36ers | Gold Coast Convention Centre | 2,238 | boxscore |

=== Round 10 ===
| Date | Home | Score | Away | Venue | Crowd | Boxscore |
|---|---|---|---|---|---|---|
| 19/11/2008 | Melbourne Tigers | 99–98 | Cairns Taipans | State Netball and Hockey Centre | 2,480 | boxscore |
| 20/11/2008 | New Zealand Breakers | 112–98 | South Dragons | North Shore Events Centre | 3,010 | boxscore |
| 21/11/2008 | Sydney Spirit | 110–108 | Adelaide 36ers | State Sports Centre | 1,456 | boxscore |
| 22/11/2008 | Townsville Crocodiles | 121–113 | Wollongong Hawks | Townsville Entertainment Centre | 4,046 | boxscore |
| 22/11/2008 | Cairns Taipans | 85–101 | Perth Wildcats | Cairns Convention Centre | 3,340 | boxscore |
| 22/11/2008 | Adelaide 36ers | 100–106 | South Dragons | Adelaide Arena | 5,358 | boxscore |

=== Round 11 ===
| Date | Home | Score | Away | Venue | Crowd | Boxscore |
|---|---|---|---|---|---|---|
| 26/11/2008 | South Dragons | 102–64 | Cairns Taipans | Hisense Arena | 3,894 | boxscore |
| 26/11/2008 | Townsville Crocodiles | 113–105 | Melbourne Tigers | Townsville Entertainment Centre | 3,762 | boxscore |
| 27/11/2008 | New Zealand Breakers | 108–94 | Perth Wildcats | North Shore Events Centre | 3,062 | boxscore |
| 29/11/2008 | Sydney Spirit | 103–94 | South Dragons | State Sports Centre | 2,572 | boxscore |
| 29/11/2008 | Cairns Taipans | 90–94 | Townsville Crocodiles | Cairns Convention Centre | 3,483 | boxscore |
| 29/11/2008 | Gold Coast Blaze | 88–110 | New Zealand Breakers | Gold Coast Convention Centre | 2,551 | boxscore |
| 29/11/2008 | Adelaide 36ers | 101–96 | Wollongong Hawks | Adelaide Arena | 4,462 | boxscore |
| 29/11/2008 | Perth Wildcats | 95–108 | Melbourne Tigers | Marrara Indoor Stadium | 1,500 | boxscore |

=== Round 12 ===
| Date | Home | Score | Away | Venue | Crowd | Boxscore |
|---|---|---|---|---|---|---|
| 3/12/2008 | Wollongong Hawks | 78–112 | South Dragons | WIN Entertainment Centre | 2,059 | boxscore |
| 4/12/2008 | New Zealand Breakers | 88–104 | Townsville Crocodiles | North Shore Events Centre | 3,226 | boxscore |
| 5/12/2008 | Cairns Taipans | 78–92 | Sydney Spirit | Cairns Convention Centre | 2,954 | boxscore |
| 6/12/2008 | South Dragons | 101–83 | Wollongong Hawks | Hisense Arena | 4,812 | boxscore |
| 6/12/2008 | Townsville Crocodiles | 92–87 | Sydney Spirit | Townsville Entertainment Centre | 3,807 | boxscore |
| 6/12/2008 | Adelaide 36ers | 102–94 | Melbourne Tigers | Adelaide Arena | 4,881 | boxscore |
| 7/12/2008 | Gold Coast Blaze | 129–97 | Perth Wildcats | Gold Coast Convention Centre | 2,021 | boxscore |

=== Round 13 ===
| Date | Home | Score | Away | Venue | Crowd | Boxscore |
|---|---|---|---|---|---|---|
| 10/12/2008 | Adelaide 36ers | 100–79 | Townsville Crocodiles | Adelaide Arena | 4,208 | boxscore |
| 13/12/2008 | Melbourne Tigers | 98–107 | South Dragons | State Netball and Hockey Centre | 3,500 | boxscore |
| 13/12/2008 | Gold Coast Blaze | 88–97 | Cairns Taipans | Gold Coast Convention Centre | 2,489 | boxscore |
| 13/12/2008 | Townsville Crocodiles | 104–99 | Wollongong Hawks | Townsville Entertainment Centre | 3,913 | boxscore |
| 13/12/2008 | Perth Wildcats | 129–120 | Adelaide 36ers | Challenge Stadium | 4,200 | boxscore |

=== Round 14 ===
| Date | Home | Score | Away | Venue | Crowd | Boxscore |
|---|---|---|---|---|---|---|
| 17/10/2008 | Gold Coast Blaze | 91–88 | Wollongong Hawks | Gold Coast Convention Centre | 2,152 | boxscore |
| 17/12/2008 | Cairns Taipans | 63–69 | Melbourne Tigers | Cairns Convention Centre | 3,746 | boxscore |
| 18/12/2008 | New Zealand Breakers | 114–70 | Sydney Spirit | North Shore Events Centre | 3,841 | boxscore |
| 20/12/2008 | Melbourne Tigers | 128–101 | Wollongong Hawks | State Netball and Hockey Centre | 3,025 | boxscore |
| 20/12/2008 | South Dragons | 88–84 | Townsville Crocodiles | Hisense Arena | 3,814 | boxscore |
| 20/12/2008 | Adelaide 36ers | 107–104 | Gold Coast Blaze | Adelaide Arena | 4,948 | boxscore |
| 20/12/2008 | Perth Wildcats | 94–118 | New Zealand Breakers | Challenge Stadium | 4,300 | boxscore |
| 21/12/2008 | Sydney Spirit | 101–90 | Townsville Crocodiles | State Sports Centre | 1,240 | boxscore |

=== Round 15 ===
| Date | Home | Score | Away | Venue | Crowd | Boxscore |
|---|---|---|---|---|---|---|
| 26/12/2008 | South Dragons | 117–87 | Gold Coast Blaze | Hisense Arena | 3,898 | boxscore |
| 27/12/2008 | Wollongong Hawks | 121–117 | Sydney Spirit | WIN Entertainment Centre | 1,874 | boxscore |
| 27/12/2008 | Melbourne Tigers | 91–109 | Adelaide 36ers | State Netball and Hockey Centre | 3,097 | boxscore |
| 27/12/2008 | Perth Wildcats | 97–76 | Townsville Crocodiles | Challenge Stadium | 4,200 | boxscore |

=== Round 16 ===
| Date | Home | Score | Away | Venue | Crowd | Boxscore |
|---|---|---|---|---|---|---|
| 31/12/2008 | Townsville Crocodiles | 105–95 | South Dragons | Townsville Entertainment Centre | 4,644 | boxscore |
| 31/12/2008 | Cairns Taipans | 105–112 | Wollongong Hawks | Cairns Convention Centre | 3,853 | boxscore |
| 31/12/2008 | Gold Coast Blaze | 103–94 | Adelaide 36ers | Gold Coast Convention Centre | 2,233 | boxscore |
| 2/01/2009 | Wollongong Hawks | 111–94 | New Zealand Breakers | WIN Entertainment Centre | 2,175 | boxscore |
| 3/01/2009 | South Dragons | 90–99 | Perth Wildcats | Hisense Arena | 4,069 | boxscore |
| 3/01/2009 | Sydney Spirit | 86–85 | New Zealand Breakers | Whitlam Centre | 920 | boxscore |
| 4/01/2009 | Gold Coast Blaze | 88–105 | Townsville Crocodiles | Gold Coast Convention Centre | 2,374 | boxscore |

=== Round 17 ===
| Date | Home | Score | Away | Venue | Crowd | Boxscore |
|---|---|---|---|---|---|---|
| 7/01/2009 | Adelaide 36ers | 106–99 | Wollongong Hawks | Adelaide Arena | 6,307 | boxscore |
| 9/01/2009 | Perth Wildcats | 77–81 | Cairns Taipans | Challenge Stadium | 4,100 | boxscore |
| 10/01/2009 | Sydney Spirit | 88–79 | Wollongong Hawks | State Sports Centre | 1,469 | boxscore |
| 10/01/2009 | South Dragons | 115–112 | New Zealand Breakers | Melbourne Sports & Aquatic Centre | 1,994 | boxscore |
| 10/01/2009 | Adelaide 36ers | 107–86 | Cairns Taipans | Adelaide Arena | 5,039 | boxscore |
| 11/01/2009 | Melbourne Tigers | 108–81 | Perth Wildcats | State Netball and Hockey Centre | 2,930 | boxscore |
| 11/01/2009 | Townsville Crocodiles | 115–92 | Gold Coast Blaze | Townsville Entertainment Centre | 4,457 | boxscore |

=== Round 18 ===
| Date | Home | Score | Away | Venue | Crowd | Boxscore |
|---|---|---|---|---|---|---|
| 14/01/2009 | Melbourne Tigers | 99–79 | Sydney Spirit | State Netball and Hockey Centre | 2,922 | boxscore |
| 15/01/2009 | New Zealand Breakers | 95–86 | Townsville Crocodiles | North Shore Events Centre | 3,349 | boxscore |
| 16/01/2009 | Cairns Taipans | 79–70 | Adelaide 36ers | Cairns Convention Centre | 3,679 | boxscore |
| 16/01/2009 | Gold Coast Blaze | 107–116 | Melbourne Tigers | Gold Coast Convention Centre | 2,711 | boxscore |
| 17/01/2009 | Wollongong Hawks | 94–108 | Melbourne Tigers | WIN Entertainment Centre | 2,555 | boxscore |
| 17/01/2009 | Townsville Crocodiles | 128–105 | Adelaide 36ers | Townsville Entertainment Centre | 4,349 | boxscore |
| 17/01/2009 | Perth Wildcats | 114–84 | Sydney Spirit | Challenge Stadium | 3,800 | boxscore |

=== Round 19 ===
| Date | Home | Score | Away | Venue | Crowd | Boxscore |
|---|---|---|---|---|---|---|
| 21/01/2009 | Adelaide 36ers | 110–88 | Gold Coast Blaze | Adelaide Arena | 4,965 | boxscore |
| 22/01/2009 | New Zealand Breakers | 85–103 | Melbourne Tigers | North Shore Events Centre | 3,000 | boxscore |
| 24/01/2009 | Melbourne Tigers | 96–89 | New Zealand Breakers | State Netball and Hockey Centre | 2,842 | boxscore |
| 24/01/2009 | Wollongong Hawks | 95–97 | Townsville Crocodiles | WIN Entertainment Centre | 1,983 | boxscore |
| 24/01/2009 | Cairns Taipans | 89–83 | Sydney Spirit | Cairns Convention Centre | 3,407 | boxscore |
| 24/01/2009 | Perth Wildcats | 96–90 | Gold Coast Blaze | Challenge Stadium | 4,100 | boxscore |

=== Round 20 ===
| Date | Home | Score | Away | Venue | Crowd | Boxscore |
|---|---|---|---|---|---|---|
| 26/01/2009 | Melbourne Tigers | 92–86 | South Dragons | State Netball and Hockey Centre | 3,500 | boxscore |
| 28/01/2009 | Sydney Spirit | 78–88 | Perth Wildcats | State Sports Centre | 1,480 | boxscore |
| 29/01/2009 | New Zealand Breakers | 94–101 | South Dragons | North Shore Events Centre | 3,200 | boxscore |
| 30/01/2009 | Wollongong Hawks | 104–113 | Melbourne Tigers | WIN Entertainment Centre | 1,525 | boxscore |
| 31/01/2009 | Townsville Crocodiles | 123–92 | Cairns Taipans | Townsville Entertainment Centre | 4,867 | boxscore |
| 31/01/2009 | Gold Coast Blaze | 139–119 | Sydney Spirit | Gold Coast Convention Centre | 2,627 | boxscore |
| 31/01/2009 | Adelaide 36ers | 107–92 | Perth Wildcats | Adelaide Arena | 5,350 | boxscore |

=== Round 21 ===
| Date | Home | Score | Away | Venue | Crowd | Boxscore |
|---|---|---|---|---|---|---|
| 4/02/2009 | South Dragons | 97–77 | Adelaide 36ers | Hisense Arena | 4,621 | boxscore |
| 4/02/2009 | Sydney Spirit | 81–89 | Cairns Taipans | State Sports Centre | 920 | boxscore |
| 6/02/2009 | Wollongong Hawks | 103–98 | New Zealand Breakers | WIN Entertainment Centre | 2,740 | boxscore |
| 6/02/2009 | Townsville Crocodiles | 101–98 | South Dragons | Townsville Entertainment Centre | 4,485 | boxscore |
| 7/02/2009 | Cairns Taipans | 88–93 | Gold Coast Blaze | Cairns Convention Centre | 4,022 | boxscore |
| 7/02/2009 | Adelaide 36ers | 102–91 | New Zealand Breakers | Adelaide Arena | 8,000 | boxscore |
| 7/02/2009 | Perth Wildcats | 106–88 | Sydney Spirit | Challenge Stadium | 4,000 | boxscore |
| 8/02/2009 | South Dragons | 93–83 | Melbourne Tigers | Hisense Arena | 8,093 | boxscore |

=== Round 22 ===
| Date | Home | Score | Away | Venue | Crowd | Boxscore |
|---|---|---|---|---|---|---|
| 11/02/2009 | Melbourne Tigers | 103–87 | Townsville Crocodiles | State Netball and Hockey Centre | 2,802 | boxscore |
| 12/02/2009 | New Zealand Breakers | 103–69 | Cairns Taipans | North Shore Events Centre | 3,100 | boxscore |
| 13/02/2009 | Wollongong Hawks | 102–95 | Adelaide 36ers | WIN Entertainment Centre | 5,674 | boxscore |
| 14/02/2009 | Sydney Spirit | 97–107 | New Zealand Breakers | State Sports Centre | 1,282 | boxscore |
| 14/02/2009 | Gold Coast Blaze | 114–104 | Wollongong Hawks | Gold Coast Convention Centre | 3,347 | boxscore |
| 14/02/2009 | Cairns Taipans | 80–82 | South Dragons | Cairns Convention Centre | 4,107 | boxscore |
| 14/02/2009 | Perth Wildcats | 100–86 | Melbourne Tigers | Challenge Stadium | 4,200 | boxscore |

== Ladder ==
| Pos | 2008–09 NBL season | | | | | | | | | | | |
| Pos | Team | Pld | W | L | PCT | Last 5 | Streak | Home | Away | PF | PA | PP |
|---|---|---|---|---|---|---|---|---|---|---|---|---|
| 1 | South Dragons | 30 | 22 | 8 | 73.33% | 4–1 | W2 | 13–2 | 9–6 | 2968 | 2692 | 110.25% |
| 2 | Melbourne Tigers | 30 | 20 | 10 | 66.67% | 3–2 | L1 | 11–4 | 9–6 | 3030 | 2846 | 106.47% |
| 3 | New Zealand Breakers | 30 | 18 | 12 | 60.00% | 2–3 | W2 | 10–5 | 8–7 | 3087 | 2910 | 106.08% |
| 4 | Perth Wildcats^{1} | 30 | 17 | 13 | 56.67% | 4–1 | W2 | 11–4 | 6–9 | 2880 | 2822 | 102.06% |
| 5 | Townsville Crocodiles^{1} | 30 | 17 | 13 | 56.67% | 4–1 | L1 | 12–3 | 5–10 | 2956 | 2978 | 99.26% |
| 6 | Adelaide 36ers | 30 | 15 | 15 | 50.00% | 3–2 | L1 | 12–3 | 3–12 | 2956 | 2929 | 100.92% |
| 7 | Wollongong Hawks^{2} | 30 | 11 | 19 | 36.67% | 2–3 | L1 | 9–6 | 2–13 | 2924 | 3077 | 95.03% |
| 8 | Sydney Spirit^{2} | 30 | 11 | 19 | 36.67% | 0–5 | L8 | 9–6 | 2–13 | 2823 | 2987 | 94.51% |
| 9 | Cairns Taipans^{2} | 30 | 11 | 19 | 36.67% | 1–4 | L3 | 5–10 | 6–9 | 2589 | 2767 | 93.57% |
| 10 | Gold Coast Blaze | 30 | 8 | 22 | 26.67% | 3–2 | W3 | 6–9 | 2–13 | 2927 | 3132 | 93.45% |

Updated to match(es) played on 14 February 2009. Source: NBL.com.au

The NBL tie-breaker system as outlined in the NBL Rules and Regulations states that in the case of an identical win–loss record, the results in games played between the teams will determine order of seeding.

^{1}Perth Wildcats won Head-to-Head (3-1).

^{2}3-way Head-to-Head between Wollongong Hawks (5-2), Sydney Spirit (3-4) and Cairns Taipans (2-4).

== Finals ==
=== Playoff bracket ===
Elimination Finals
4 | Perth Wildcats | 96
5 | Townsville Crocodiles | 103
3 | New Zealand Breakers | 131
6 | Adelaide 36ers | 101

Semifinals
1 | South Dragons | 94 | 77 | 101
5 | Townsville Crocodiles | 81 | 82 | 78
2 | Melbourne Tigers | 117 | 103 | X
3 | New Zealand Breakers | 99 | 97 | X

Grand Final
1 | South Dragons | 93 | 83 | 84 | 95 | 102
2 | Melbourne Tigers | 81 | 88 | 67 | 108 | 81

=== Elimination Finals ===
| Date | Home | Score | Away | Venue | Crowd | Boxscore |
|---|---|---|---|---|---|---|
| 18/02/2009 | Perth Wildcats | 96–103 | Townsville Crocodiles | Challenge Stadium | 4,400 | boxscore |
| 19/02/2009 | New Zealand Breakers | 131–101 | Adelaide 36ers | North Shore Events Centre | 4,000 | boxscore |

=== Semi-finals ===
| Date | Home | Score | Away | Venue | Crowd | Boxscore |
|---|---|---|---|---|---|---|
| 24/02/2009 | South Dragons | 94–81 | Townsville Crocodiles | Hisense Arena | 3,613 | boxscore |
| 25/02/2009 | Melbourne Tigers | 117–99 | New Zealand Breakers | State Netball and Hockey Centre | 2,998 | boxscore |
| 26/02/2009 | Townsville Crocodiles | 82–77 | South Dragons | Townsville Entertainment Centre | 4,505 | boxscore |
| 27/02/2009 | New Zealand Breakers | 97–103 | Melbourne Tigers | North Shore Events Centre | 4,500 | boxscore |
| 28/02/2009 | South Dragons | 101–78 | Townsville Crocodiles | Hisense Arena | 3,007 | boxscore |

=== Grand Final ===
| Date | Home | Score | Away | Venue | Crowd | Boxscore |
|---|---|---|---|---|---|---|
| 4/03/2009 | South Dragons | 93–81 | Melbourne Tigers | Hisense Arena | 4,211 | boxscore |
| 6/03/2009 | Melbourne Tigers | 88–83 | South Dragons | State Netball and Hockey Centre | 3,096 | boxscore |
| 8/03/2009 | South Dragons | 84–67 | Melbourne Tigers | Hisense Arena | 8,201 | boxscore |
| 11/03/2009 | Melbourne Tigers | 108–95 | South Dragons | State Netball and Hockey Centre | 3,500 | boxscore |
| 13/03/2009 | South Dragons | 102–81 | Melbourne Tigers | Hisense Arena | 8,922 | boxscore |

== Player of the Week ==
| Round | Player | Team |
|---|---|---|
| 1 | Kirk Penney | New Zealand Breakers |
| 2 | Corey Williams | Townsville Crocodiles |
| 3 | Mark Worthington | South Dragons |
| 4 | Darnell Mee | Cairns Taipans |
| 5 | Joe Ingles | South Dragons |
| 6 | Luke Schenscher | Adelaide 36ers |
| 7 | Sam Mackinnon | Melbourne Tigers |
| 8 | Kirk Penney | New Zealand Breakers |
| 9 | Rick Rickert | New Zealand Breakers |
| 10 | Julius Hodge | Adelaide 36ers |
| 11 | Matthew Knight | Sydney Spirit |
| 12 | Justin Bowen | Gold Coast Blaze |
| 13 | Ian Crosswhite | Cairns Taipans |
| 14 | Tony Ronaldson | New Zealand Breakers |
| 15 | Julius Hodge | Adelaide 36ers |
| 16 | Isiah Victor | Perth Wildcats |
| 17 | Luke Schenscher | Adelaide 36ers |
| 18 | Ebi Ere | Melbourne Tigers |
| 19 | Adam Ballinger | Adelaide 36ers |
| 20 | James Harvey | Gold Coast Blaze |
| 21 | John Rillie | Townsville Crocodiles |
| 22 | Shawn Redhage | Perth Wildcats |

== Player of the Month ==
| Month | Player | Team |
|---|---|---|
| September/October | Kirk Penney | New Zealand Breakers |
| November | Kirk Penney | New Zealand Breakers |
| December | Julius Hodge | Adelaide 36ers |
| January/February | Luke Schenscher | Adelaide 36ers |

== Coach of the Month ==
| Month | Player | Team |
|---|---|---|
| September/October | Brian Goorjian | South Dragons |
| November | Andrej Lemanis | New Zealand Breakers |
| December | Scott Ninnis | Adelaide 36ers |
| January/February | Al Westover | Melbourne Tigers |

== NBL awards ==
- Most Valuable Player: Kirk Penney, New Zealand Breakers
- Rookie of the Year: Aaron Bruce, Adelaide 36ers
- Best Defensive Player: Adam Gibson, South Dragons
- Best Sixth Man: Phill Jones, New Zealand Breakers
- Most Improved Player: Matthew Knight, Sydney Spirit
- Coach of the Year: Brian Goorjian, South Dragons
- Finals MVP: Donta Smith, South Dragons
- All-NBL First Team:
  - Kirk Penney – New Zealand Breakers
  - Chris Anstey – Melbourne Tigers
  - C. J. Bruton – New Zealand Breakers
  - Ebi Ere – Melbourne Tigers
  - Mark Worthington – South Dragons
- All-NBL Second Team:
  - Corey Williams – Townsville Crocodiles
  - Luke Schenscher – Adelaide 36ers
  - Adam Ballinger – Adelaide 36ers
  - Shawn Redhage – Perth Wildcats
  - Glen Saville – Wollongong Hawks
- All-NBL Third Team:
  - Matthew Knight – Sydney Spirit
  - James Harvey – Gold Coast Blaze
  - David Barlow – Melbourne Tigers
  - Joe Ingles – South Dragons
  - Adam Gibson – South Dragons

== Television coverage ==
- Australia – Fox Sports
- New Zealand – Maori TV

== Radio coverage ==
| Team | Station |
|---|---|
| Adelaide 36ers | 891 ABC Adelaide |
| Cairns Taipans | 4CA FM |
| Melbourne Tigers | Tiger Radio |
| New Zealand Breakers | Radio Sport |
| Perth Wildcats | SportFM |
| South Dragons | Dragons Radio |
| Townsville Crocodiles | 4TO FM |
