= 2007–08 NBL season =

Professional basketball season

- Logo of the league sponsored by Hummer
- League: National Basketball League
- Season: 2007–08
- Dates: 19 September 2007 – 14 March 2008
- Teams: 13
- TV partners: Australia: Fox Sports Nine Network (Highlights); New Zealand: Sky Sport Māori Television

Regular season
- Season champions: Sydney Kings
- Season MVP: (Australia) Chris Anstey (Melbourne)

Finals
- Champions: Melbourne Tigers (4th title)
- Runners-up: Sydney Kings
- Semi-finalists: Brisbane Bullets; Perth Wildcats
- Finals MVP: (Australia) Chris Anstey (Melbourne)

Statistical leaders
Points	(Nigeria) Ebi Ere (Brisbane)	26.0
Rebounds	(Australia) Chris Anstey (Melbourne)	11.6
Assists	(Australia) Stephen Black (Cairns)	5.6

NBL seasons
- ← 2006–07 2008–09 →

The 2007–08 NBL season was the 30th season of competition since its establishment in 1979. On 21 November 2006, the Gold Coast Blaze joined the league, expanding it to 13 teams.

== 2007–08 league participants ==
=== Stadiums and locations ===
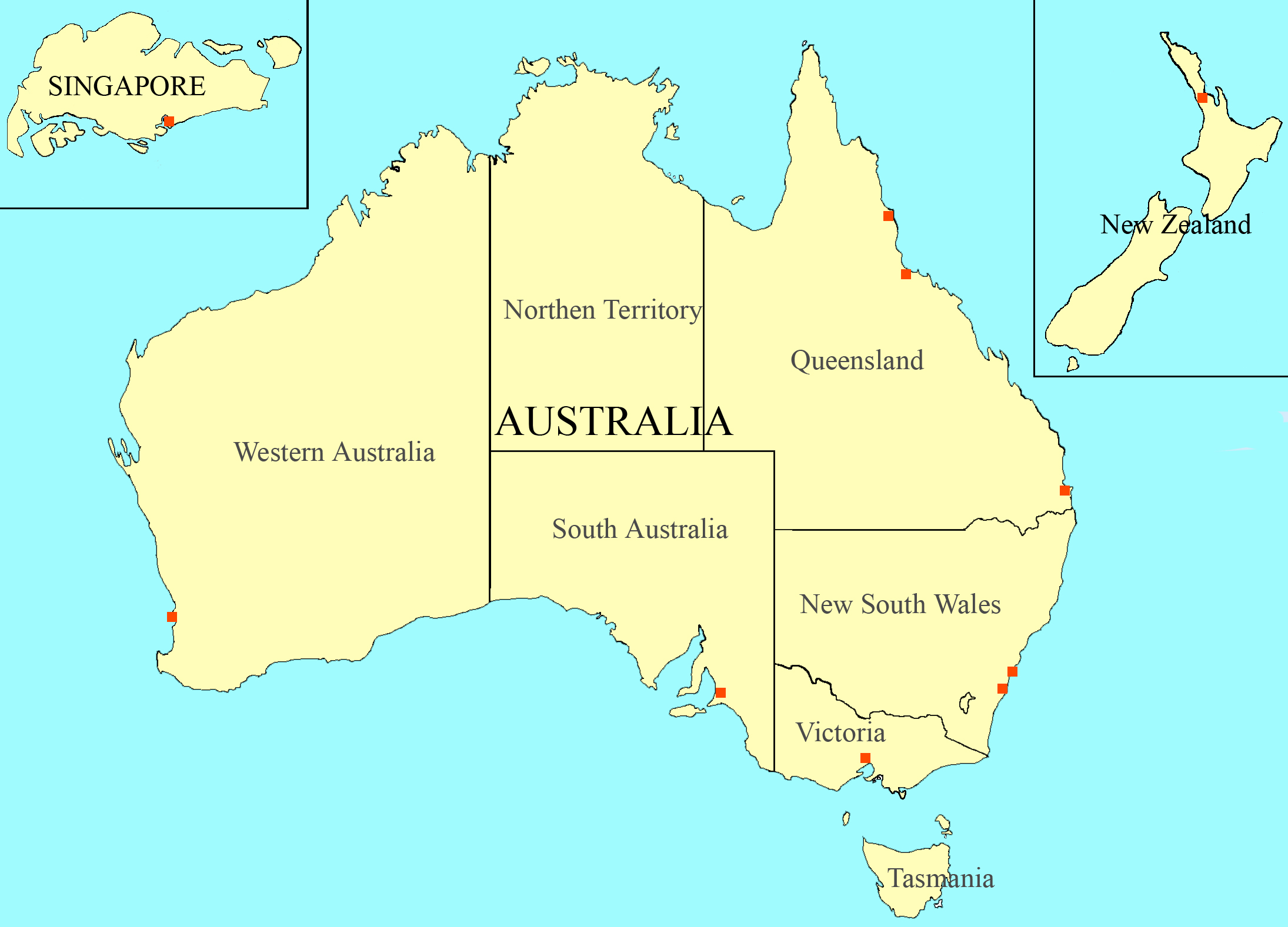

Team	Region	CEO	Coach	Home ground	Capacity
Adelaide 36ers	SA	Mal Hemmerling	Phil Smyth	Distinctive Homes Dome	8,000
Brisbane Bullets	Qld	Jeff Van Groningen	Joey Wright	Brisbane Convention & Exhibition Centre	4,000
Cairns Taipans	Qld	Denis Keeffe	Alan Black	Cairns Convention Centre	5,300
Gold Coast Blaze	Qld	David Claxton	Brendan Joyce	Gold Coast Convention & Exhibition Centre	5,269
Melbourne Tigers	Vic	Seamus McPeake	Alan Westover	State Netball & Hockey Centre	3,500
New Zealand Breakers	NZL	Richard Clarke	Andrej Lemanis	North Shore Events Centre	4,400
Perth Wildcats	WA	Nick Marvin	Scott Fisher	Challenge Stadium	4,500
Singapore Slingers	Sin	Bob Turner	Gordon McLeod	Singapore Indoor Stadium	12,000
South Dragons	Vic	Ryan Gardiner	Shane Heal	Vodafone Arena	10,500
Sydney Kings	NSW	Garry Hudson	Brian Goorjian	Sydney Entertainment Centre	10,517
Townsville Crocodiles	Qld	Ian Smythe	Trevor Gleeson	Townsville Entertainment & Convention Centre	5,257
West Sydney Razorbacks	NSW	Darren Drysdale	Rob Beveridge	State Sports Centre	5,006
Wollongong Hawks	NSW		Eric Cooks	WIN Entertainment Centre	6,000

== Preseason transactions ==
Player	Recruited from	Signed by
Larry Abney	Townsville Crocodiles	Cairns Taipans
Adam Ballinger	Wollongong Hawks	Adelaide 36ers
David Barlow	Sydney Kings	Melbourne Tigers
Stephen Black	Brisbane Bullets	Cairns Taipans
Mark Bradtke	Brisbane Bullets	Retired
Brad Davidson	Singapore Slingers	Adelaide 36ers
Casey Frank	Wollongong Hawks	Gold Coast Blaze
Kavossy Franklin	South Dragons	Wollongong Hawks
Cortez Groves	Wollongong Hawks	South Dragons
Brad Hill	Adelaide 36ers	South Dragons
Nick Horvath	Adelaide 36ers	South Dragons
Nathan Jawai	Australian Institute of Sport	Cairns Taipans
Ryan Kersten	University of New Mexico	New Zealand Breakers
Alex Loughton	Gandía BA (LEB Spain)	Perth Wildcats
Luke Martin	Cairns Taipans	South Dragons
Ben Melmeth	Singapore Slingers	Gold Coast Blaze
Scott McGregor	West Sydney Razorbacks	Gold Coast Blaze
Brad Newley	Townsville Crocodiles	Adelaide 36ers
Ben Pepper	New Zealand Breakers	Townsville Crocodiles
Anthony Petrie	Canberra Gunners (ABA)	West Sydney Razorbacks
Tony Rampton	Wollongong Hawks	West Sydney Razorbacks
Tony Ronaldson	Perth Wildcats	New Zealand Breakers
Bradley Sheridan	Sydney Kings	Townsville Crocodiles
Anthony Stewart	Cairns Taipans	Retired

- Unless stated otherwise the source for the above information is the NBL article "Movers and Shakers"

== Sponsors ==
Team	Major sponsor
Adelaide 36ers	ABC Learning Centres
Brisbane Bullets	Virgin Blue
Cairns Taipans	Skytrans Airlines
Gold Coast Blaze	none
Melbourne Tigers	Aust Tiger
New Zealand Breakers	Harvey Norman
Perth Wildcats	Saville Australia
Singapore Slingers	CLSA
South Dragons	Crazy John's
Sydney Kings	Firepower
Townsville Crocodiles	McDonald's
West Sydney Razorbacks	Westbus
Wollongong Hawks	IMB

== Apparel ==
Team	Provider	Home colour	Away colour
Adelaide 36ers	ISC	Blue	White
Brisbane Bullets	Hoop2Hoop	Royal Blue	White
Cairns Taipans	Kombat	Orange	White
Gold Coast Blaze	ISC	Sky Blue	White
Melbourne Tigers	Kombat	Red	Yellow
New Zealand Breakers	Sport & Uniform	Black	White
Perth Wildcats	ISC	Red	White
Singapore Slingers	ISC	Red	Gold
South Dragons	Kombat	Black	White
Sydney Kings	ISC	Purple	White
Townsville Crocodiles	Kombat	Green	White
West Sydney Razorbacks	Soul Sports	Navy Blue	White
Wollongong Hawks	Kombat	Red	White

== Regular season ==
The 2007–08 regular season took place over 22 rounds between 19 September 2007 and 16 February 2008.

=== Round 1 ===
Date	Home	Score	Away	Venue	Crowd	Boxscore
19/09/2007	Gold Coast Blaze	105–115	Brisbane Bullets	Gold Coast Convention Centre	4,137	boxscore
19/09/2007	West Sydney Razorbacks	114–116	Townsville Crocodiles	State Sports Centre	1,860	boxscore
19/09/2007	Singapore Slingers	94–117	Melbourne Tigers	Singapore Indoor Stadium	3,200	boxscore
20/09/2007	New Zealand Breakers	90–95	Cairns Taipans	North Shore Events Centre	2,000	boxscore
21/09/2007	Adelaide 36ers	108–101	Wollongong Hawks	Adelaide Arena	4,126	boxscore
22/09/2007	Melbourne Tigers	100–88	Wollongong Hawks	State Netball and Hockey Centre	2,753	boxscore
22/09/2007	Cairns Taipans	99–75	Townsville Crocodiles	Cairns Convention Centre	4,006	boxscore
22/09/2007	South Dragons	106–116	West Sydney Razorbacks	Vodafone Arena	3,129	boxscore
23/09/2007	Sydney Kings	88–79	Gold Coast Blaze	Sydney Entertainment Centre	3,951	boxscore
23/09/2007	Perth Wildcats	112–80	Singapore Slingers	Challenge Stadium	4,000	boxscore

=== Round 2 ===
Date	Home	Score	Away	Venue	Crowd	Boxscore
26/09/2007	Townsville Crocodiles	78–85	Sydney Kings	Townsville Entertainment Centre	4,500	boxscore
26/09/2007	Singapore Slingers	93–99	Gold Coast Blaze	Singapore Indoor Stadium	1,300	boxscore
28/09/2007	Wollongong Hawks	88–113	Brisbane Bullets	WIN Entertainment Centre	2,775	boxscore
28/09/2007	Adelaide 36ers	85–101	Melbourne Tigers	Adelaide Arena	4,400	boxscore
29/09/2007	West Sydney Razorbacks	108–95	Perth Wildcats	State Sports Centre	2,234	boxscore
29/09/2007	Cairns Taipans	88–72	Gold Coast Blaze	Cairns Convention Centre	3,949	boxscore

=== Round 3 ===
Date	Home	Score	Away	Venue	Crowd	Boxscore
2/10/2007	Singapore Slingers	101–86	Townsville Crocodiles	Singapore Indoor Stadium	1,300	boxscore
3/10/2007	South Dragons	81–97	Perth Wildcats	Vodafone Arena	3,952	boxscore
4/10/2007	New Zealand Breakers	96–104	West Sydney Razorbacks	North Shore Events Centre	2,011	boxscore
5/10/2007	Wollongong Hawks	84–89	Cairns Taipans	WIN Entertainment Centre	2,898	boxscore
5/10/2007	Brisbane Bullets	116–107	Perth Wildcats	Brisbane Convention Centre	2,984	boxscore
6/10/2007	Sydney Kings	92–85	Cairns Taipans	Sydney Entertainment Centre	4,224	boxscore
6/10/2007	Townsville Crocodiles	84–113	Brisbane Bullets	Townsville Entertainment Centre	4,549	boxscore
6/10/2007	Gold Coast Blaze	90–96	Melbourne Tigers	Gold Coast Convention Centre	3,524	boxscore
6/10/2007	Adelaide 36ers	115–108	South Dragons	Adelaide Arena	4,959	boxscore

=== Round 4 ===
Date	Home	Score	Away	Venue	Crowd	Boxscore
10/10/2007	Cairns Taipans	82–99	Melbourne Tigers	Cairns Convention Centre	3,843	boxscore
10/10/2007	Perth Wildcats	95–91	Adelaide 36ers	Challenge Stadium	4,200	boxscore
11/10/2007	New Zealand Breakers	98–97	Townsville Crocodiles	North Shore Events Centre	2,110	boxscore
12/10/2007	Wollongong Hawks	132–109	West Sydney Razorbacks	WIN Entertainment Centre	2,999	boxscore
13/10/2007	Gold Coast Blaze	97–82	Singapore Slingers	Gold Coast Convention Centre	3,853	boxscore
13/10/2007	Melbourne Tigers	101–98	South Dragons	State Netball and Hockey Centre	3,500	boxscore
14/10/2007	South Dragons	85–95	Sydney Kings	Vodafone Arena	3,928	boxscore
14/10/2007	Brisbane Bullets	127–106	Singapore Slingers	Brisbane Convention Centre	2,500	boxscore

=== Round 5 ===
Date	Home	Score	Away	Venue	Crowd	Boxscore
17/10/2007	Brisbane Bullets	117–127	Sydney Kings	Brisbane Convention Centre	3,117	boxscore
17/10/2007	Singapore Slingers	96–105	Melbourne Tigers	Singapore Indoor Stadium	2,500	boxscore
18/10/2007	New Zealand Breakers	116–109	Adelaide 36ers	North Shore Events Centre	2,166	boxscore
20/10/2007	South Dragons	109–110	Brisbane Bullets	Vodafone Arena	4,198	boxscore
20/10/2007	West Sydney Razorbacks	103–96	Sydney Kings	State Sports Centre	3,850	boxscore
20/10/2007	Gold Coast Blaze	106–92	Wollongong Hawks	Gold Coast Convention Centre	3,638	boxscore
20/10/2007	Townsville Crocodiles	112–90	Adelaide 36ers	Townsville Entertainment Centre	4,388	boxscore
21/10/2007	Perth Wildcats	87–73	Cairns Taipans	Challenge Stadium	4,000	boxscore
21/10/2007	Singapore Slingers	99–116	New Zealand Breakers	Singapore Indoor Stadium	2,100	boxscore

=== Round 6 ===
Date	Home	Score	Away	Venue	Crowd	Boxscore
24/10/2007	Sydney Kings	100–82	Adelaide 36ers	Sydney Entertainment Centre	2,483	boxscore
26/10/2007	Wollongong Hawks	114–97	Perth Wildcats	WIN Entertainment Centre	3,316	boxscore
26/10/2007	Townsville Crocodiles	129–126	West Sydney Razorbacks	Townsville Entertainment Centre	4,119	boxscore
27/10/2007	Melbourne Tigers	115–90	New Zealand Breakers	State Netball and Hockey Centre	3,221	boxscore
27/10/2007	Adelaide 36ers	94–98	Gold Coast Blaze	Adelaide Arena	4,301	boxscore
27/10/2007	Cairns Taipans	112–90	Brisbane Bullets	Cairns Convention Centre	4,110	boxscore
28/10/2007	West Sydney Razorbacks	104–115	Wollongong Hawks	State Sports Centre	2,476	boxscore
28/10/2007	South Dragons	102–90	New Zealand Breakers	Vodafone Arena	3,443	boxscore
28/10/2007	Singapore Slingers	90–99	Sydney Kings	Singapore Indoor Stadium	2,000	boxscore

=== Round 7 ===
Date	Home	Score	Away	Venue	Crowd	Boxscore
31/10/2007	West Sydney Razorbacks	97–95	Cairns Taipans	State Sports Centre	1,726	boxscore
1/11/2007	New Zealand Breakers	127–126	Brisbane Bullets	North Shore Events Centre	2,200	boxscore
2/11/2007	Sydney Kings	106–79	Townsville Crocodiles	Sydney Entertainment Centre	3,280	boxscore
3/11/2007	Melbourne Tigers	84–74	Townsville Crocodiles	State Netball and Hockey Centre	2,942	boxscore
3/11/2007	Adelaide 36ers	87–70	New Zealand Breakers	Adelaide Arena	4,443	boxscore
4/11/2007	South Dragons	115–108	Wollongong Hawks	Vodafone Arena	4,512	boxscore
4/11/2007	Gold Coast Blaze	101–80	Cairns Taipans	Gold Coast Convention Centre	4,000	boxscore
4/11/2007	Singapore Slingers	112–105	Perth Wildcats	Singapore Indoor Stadium	1,000	boxscore

=== Round 8 ===
Date	Home	Score	Away	Venue	Crowd	Boxscore
7/11/2007	Sydney Kings	114–109	Brisbane Bullets	Sydney Entertainment Centre	2,825	boxscore
8/11/2007	New Zealand Breakers	98–92	Singapore Slingers	North Shore Events Centre	2,336	boxscore
9/11/2007	Wollongong Hawks	87–101	Townsville Crocodiles	WIN Entertainment Centre	3,763	boxscore
10/11/2007	Melbourne Tigers	94–102	Sydney Kings	State Netball and Hockey Centre	3,468	boxscore
10/11/2007	West Sydney Razorbacks	102–93	Gold Coast Blaze	Sydney Superdome	4,675	boxscore
10/11/2007	South Dragons	97–103	Townsville Crocodiles	Vodafone Arena	4,215	boxscore
10/11/2007	Cairns Taipans	103–86	Wollongong Hawks	Cairns Convention Centre	4,170	boxscore
10/11/2007	Perth Wildcats	95–102	Brisbane Bullets	Challenge Stadium	4,000	boxscore
11/11/2007	Gold Coast Blaze	79–90	New Zealand Breakers	Gold Coast Convention Centre	3,400	boxscore
11/11/2007	Singapore Slingers	93–111	Adelaide 36ers	Singapore Indoor Stadium	2,500	boxscore

=== Round 9 ===
Date	Home	Score	Away	Venue	Crowd	Boxscore
14/11/2007	West Sydney Razorbacks	95–106	South Dragons	State Sports Centre	1,902	boxscore
15/11/2007	New Zealand Breakers	121–100	Wollongong Hawks	North Shore Events Centre	2,302	boxscore
16/11/2007	Sydney Kings	105–75	West Sydney Razorbacks	Sydney Entertainment Centre	4,492	boxscore
16/11/2007	South Dragons	79–99	Gold Coast Blaze	Vodafone Arena	3,310	boxscore
17/11/2007	Cairns Taipans	87–107	New Zealand Breakers	Cairns Convention Centre	4,005	boxscore
17/11/2007	Perth Wildcats	92–69	Wollongong Hawks	Challenge Stadium	3,000	boxscore
17/11/2007	Townsville Crocodiles	110–98	Singapore Slingers	Townsville Entertainment Centre	4,078	boxscore
17/11/2007	Adelaide 36ers	96–93	South Dragons	Adelaide 36ers	4,379	boxscore
18/11/2007	Gold Coast Blaze	101–92	West Sydney Razorbacks	Gold Coast Convention Centre	3,203	boxscore
18/11/2007	Brisbane Bullets	109–90	Singapore Slingers	Brisbane Convention Centre	2,600	boxscore

=== Round 10 ===
Date	Home	Score	Away	Venue	Crowd	Boxscore
21/11/2007	Townsville Crocodiles	107–81	Melbourne Tigers	Townsville Entertainment Centre	4,068	boxscore
22/11/2007	New Zealand Breakers	103–128	Cairns Taipans	North Shore Events Centre	2,287	boxscore
24/11/2007	Brisbane Bullets	121–93	Gold Coast Blaze	Brisbane Convention Centre	3,368	boxscore
24/11/2007	Perth Wildcats	103–85	Melbourne Tigers	Challenge Stadium	4,100	boxscore
25/11/2007	Adelaide 36ers	82–92	Townsville Crocodiles	Adelaide Arena	4,125	boxscore
25/11/2007	South Dragons	109–99	Singapore Slingers	Vodafone Arena	3,592	boxscore
25/11/2007	Cairns Taipans	87–102	Sydney Kings	Cairns Convention Centre	3,894	boxscore

=== Round 11 ===
Date	Home	Score	Away	Venue	Crowd	Boxscore
28/11/2007	West Sydney Razorbacks	126–95	Singapore Slingers	State Sports Centre	1,876	boxscore
28/11/2007	Sydney Kings	84–87	Perth Wildcats	Sydney Entertainment Centre	3,360	boxscore
28/11/2007	Gold Coast Blaze	117–109	Adelaide 36ers	Gold Coast Convention Centre	2,906	boxscore
29/11/2007	New Zealand Breakers	107–104	South Dragons	North Shore Events Centre	2,502	boxscore
29/11/2007	Brisbane Bullets	120–113	Townsville Crocodiles	Brisbane Convention Centre	3,087	boxscore
30/11/2007	Wollongong Hawks	82–115	Gold Coast Blaze	WIN Entertainment Centre	3,631	boxscore
1/12/2007	Melbourne Tigers	92–100	Sydney Kings	State Netball and Hockey Centre	3,396	boxscore
1/12/2007	Adelaide 36ers	125–118	West Sydney Razorbacks	Adelaide Arena	3,666	boxscore
1/12/2007	Cairns Taipans	125–96	South Dragons	Cairns Convention Centre	3,470	boxscore
1/12/2007	Townsville Crocodiles	97–93	Perth Wildcats	Townsville Entertainment Centre	4,290	boxscore
2/12/2007	Singapore Slingers	119–102	Brisbane Bullets	Singapore Indoor Stadium	3,000	boxscore

=== Round 12 ===
Date	Home	Score	Away	Venue	Crowd	Boxscore
5/12/2007	Gold Coast Blaze	127–116	South Dragons	Gold Coast Convention Centre	3,234	boxscore
5/12/2007	Wollongong Hawks	93–72	Singapore Slingers	WIN Entertainment Centre	2,843	boxscore
6/12/2007	New Zealand Breakers	100–120	Sydney Kings	North Shore Events Centre	3,326	boxscore
7/12/2007	Brisbane Bullets	120–102	West Sydney Razorbacks	Brisbane Convention Centre	3,032	boxscore
8/12/2007	Melbourne Tigers	86–79	Perth Wildcats	State Netball and Hockey Centre	3,150	boxscore
8/12/2007	Cairns Taipans	102–95	West Sydney Razorbacks	Cairns Convention Centre	3,587	boxscore
8/12/2007	Adelaide 36ers	100–112	Sydney Kings	Adelaide Arena	4,183	boxscore
8/12/2007	Townsville Crocodiles	117–105	Singapore Slingers	Townsville Entertainment Centre	4,230	boxscore

=== Round 13 ===
Date	Home	Score	Away	Venue	Crowd	Boxscore
15/12/2007	South Dragons	88–98	Melbourne Tigers	Vodafone Arena	7,402	boxscore
15/12/2007	Adelaide 36ers	104–77	Singapore Slingers	Adelaide Arena	4,414	boxscore
15/12/2007	Perth Wildcats	80–75	Townsville Crocodiles	Challenge Stadium	4,000	boxscore
16/12/2007	Sydney Kings	99–92	Wollongong Hawks	Sydney Entertainment Centre	3,294	boxscore
16/12/2007	West Sydney Razorbacks	86–105	Cairns Taipans	State Sports Centre	1,916	boxscore
16/12/2007	Brisbane Bullets	125–93	New Zealand Breakers	Brisbane Convention Centre	3,122	boxscore

=== Round 14 ===
Date	Home	Score	Away	Venue	Crowd	Boxscore
19/12/2007	Melbourne Tigers	110–92	Adelaide 36ers	State Netball and Hockey Centre	2,745	boxscore
19/12/2007	Singapore Slingers	99–113	West Sydney Razorbacks	Singapore Indoor Stadium	4,000	boxscore
20/12/2007	New Zealand Breakers	105–103	Wollongong Hawks	North Shore Events Centre	3,004	boxscore
21/12/2007	Cairns Taipans	89–93	Singapore Slingers	Cairns Convention Centre	3,925	boxscore
22/12/2007	West Sydney Razorbacks	100–122	Adelaide 36ers	State Sports Centre	1,931	boxscore
22/12/2007	Gold Coast Blaze	91–86	Singapore Slingers	Gold Coast Convention Centre	3,963	boxscore
22/12/2007	Brisbane Bullets	112–108	Melbourne Tigers	Brisbane Convention Centre	3,600	boxscore
22/12/2007	Townsville Crocodiles	108–98	Wollongong Hawks	Townsville Entertainment Centre	4,363	boxscore
22/12/2007	Perth Wildcats	108–80	South Dragons	Challenge Stadium	4,000	boxscore

=== Round 15 ===
Date	Home	Score	Away	Venue	Crowd	Boxscore
26/12/2007	South Dragons	114–119	Adelaide 36ers	Vodafone Arena	4,415	boxscore
27/12/2007	Melbourne Tigers	98–89	Cairns Taipans	State Netball and Hockey Centre	3,328	boxscore
28/12/2007	Wollongong Hawks	96–74	Townsville Crocodiles	WIN Entertainment Centre	3,666	boxscore
28/12/2007	West Sydney Razorbacks	110–105	Brisbane Bullets	State Sports Centre	1,557	boxscore
29/12/2007	Sydney Kings	103–94	New Zealand Breakers	Sydney Entertainment Centre	4,113	boxscore
29/12/2007	Brisbane Bullets	107–97	Gold Coast Blaze	Brisbane Convention Centre	3,783	boxscore
29/12/2007	Perth Wildcats	106–107	Melbourne Tigers	Challenge Stadium	4,100	boxscore

=== Round 16 ===
Date	Home	Score	Away	Venue	Crowd	Boxscore
31/12/2007	Cairns Taipans	120–112	Brisbane Bullets	Cairns Convention Centre	4,790	boxscore
31/12/2007	Townsville Crocodiles	79–87	Gold Coast Blaze	Townsville Entertainment Centre	4,843	boxscore
2/01/2008	Melbourne Tigers	117–102	Gold Coast Blaze	State Netball and Hockey Centre	3,076	boxscore
2/01/2008	Singapore Slingers	87–124	Perth Wildcats	Singapore Indoor Stadium	2,000	boxscore
4/01/2008	Wollongong Hawks	111–101	New Zealand Breakers	WIN Entertainment Centre	3,383	boxscore
4/01/2008	Townsville Crocodiles	123–88	South Dragons	Townsville Entertainment Centre	4,347	boxscore
5/01/2008	West Sydney Razorbacks	97–113	New Zealand Breakers	State Sports Centre	1,821	boxscore
5/01/2008	Sydney Kings	115–107	Melbourne Tigers	Sydney Entertainment Centre	5,182	boxscore
5/01/2008	Brisbane Bullets	132–101	South Dragons	Brisbane Convention Centre	3,286	boxscore
5/01/2008	Perth Wildcats	90–88	Adelaide 36ers	Challenge Stadium	3,900	boxscore

=== Round 17 ===
Date	Home	Score	Away	Venue	Crowd	Boxscore
9/01/2008	Wollongong Hawks	99–106	Sydney Kings	WIN Entertainment Centre	4,062	boxscore
9/01/2008	Cairns Taipans	93–89	Perth Wildcats	Cairns Convention Centre	4,107	boxscore
10/01/2008	New Zealand Breakers	126–93	Gold Coast Blaze	North Shore Events Centre	3,853	boxscore
12/01/2008	Melbourne Tigers	111–108	West Sydney Razorbacks	State Netball and Hockey Centre	3,500	boxscore
12/01/2008	Adelaide 36ers	115–93	Sydney Kings	Adelaide Arena	5,787	boxscore
12/01/2008	Brisbane Bullets	101–79	Cairns Taipans	Brisbane Entertainment Centre	3,800	boxscore
12/01/2008	Townsville Crocodiles	108–88	New Zealand Breakers	Townsville Entertainment Centre	4,546	boxscore
12/01/2008	Perth Wildcats	103–88	Gold Coast Blaze	Challenge Stadium	4,304	boxscore
13/01/2008	Singapore Slingers	113–102	Wollongong Hawks	Singapore Indoor Stadium	5,000	boxscore

=== Round 18 ===
Date	Home	Score	Away	Venue	Crowd	Boxscore
16/01/2008	Adelaide 36ers	82–101	Perth Wildcats	Adelaide Arena	6,141	boxscore
16/01/2008	South Dragons	103–105	West Sydney Razorbacks	Melbourne Sports and Aquatic Centre	2,000	boxscore
18/01/2008	Wollongong Hawks	115–108	Adelaide 36ers	WIN Entertainment Centre	3,366	boxscore
18/01/2008	Gold Coast Blaze	105–87	Townsville Crocodiles	Gold Coast Convention Centre	4,051	boxscore
19/01/2008	Melbourne Tigers	112–98	New Zealand Breakers	State Netball and Hockey Centre	3,500	boxscore
19/01/2008	Sydney Kings	108–90	West Sydney Razorbacks	Sydney Entertainment Centre	4,726	boxscore
19/01/2008	Brisbane Bullets	155–107	Adelaide 36ers	Brisbane Convention Centre	3,467	boxscore
19/01/2008	Perth Wildcats	111–99	South Dragons	Challenge Stadium	4,100	boxscore
20/01/2008	Singapore Slingers	87–99	Cairns Taipans	Singapore Indoor Stadium	2,500	boxscore

=== Round 19 ===
Date	Home	Score	Away	Venue	Crowd	Boxscore
23/01/2008	Sydney Kings	106–72	South Dragons	Sydney Entertainment Centre	2,831	boxscore
23/01/2008	Adelaide 36ers	108–113	Melbourne Tigers	Adelaide Arena	4,086	boxscore
24/01/2008	New Zealand Breakers	109–95	West Sydney Razorbacks	North Shore Events Centre	3,009	boxscore
25/01/2008	Wollongong Hawks	91–89	South Dragons	WIN Entertainment Centre	3,321	boxscore
25/01/2008	Brisbane Bullets	95–105	Perth Wildcats	Brisbane Convention Centre	4,000	boxscore
25/01/2008	Townsville Crocodiles	120–113	Cairns Taipans	Townsville Entertainment Centre	5,257	boxscore
26/01/2008	Melbourne Tigers	115–82	Singapore Slingers	State Netball and Hockey Centre	2,847	boxscore
26/01/2008	Gold Coast Blaze	88–84	Perth Wildcats	Gold Coast Convention Centre	3,600	boxscore
26/01/2008	Cairns Taipans	105–111	Adelaide 36ers	Cairns Convention Centre	4,612	boxscore

=== Round 20 ===
Date	Home	Score	Away	Venue	Crowd	Boxscore
30/01/2008	Melbourne Tigers	92–112	Brisbane Bullets	State Netball and Hockey Centre	3,341	boxscore
30/01/2008	Sydney Kings	105–86	Wollongong Hawks	Sydney Entertainment Centre	2,563	boxscore
30/01/2008	Singapore Slingers	108–93	South Dragons	Singapore Indoor Stadium	2,500	boxscore
31/01/2008	New Zealand Breakers	93–83	Perth Wildcats	North Shore Events Centre	3,223	boxscore
31/01/2008	West Sydney Razorbacks	104–111	Townsville Crocodiles	State Sports Centre	1,768	boxscore
1/02/2008	Wollongong Hawks	98–109	Melbourne Tigers	WIN Entertainment Centre	3,016	boxscore
1/02/2008	Cairns Taipans	87–85	Gold Coast Blaze	Cairns Convention Centre	3,099	boxscore
2/02/2008	South Dragons	93–104	New Zealand Breakers	Vodafone Arena	3,159	boxscore
2/02/2008	Adelaide 36ers	133–97	Brisbane Bullets	Adelaide Arena	5,023	boxscore
2/02/2008	Perth Wildcats	85–104	Sydney Kings	Challenge Stadium	4,100	boxscore
3/02/2008	Gold Coast Blaze	127–118	Adelaide 36ers	Gold Coast Convention Centre	3,107	boxscore

=== Round 21 ===
Date	Home	Score	Away	Venue	Crowd	Boxscore
6/02/2008	South Dragons	95–90	Cairns Taipans	Vodafone Arena	2,715	boxscore
6/02/2008	Perth Wildcats	107–100	West Sydney Razorbacks	Marrara Indoor Stadium	1,200	boxscore
7/02/2008	New Zealand Breakers	105–91	Melbourne Tigers	North Shore Events Centre	3,416	boxscore
8/02/2008	Wollongong Hawks	94–115	Brisbane Bullets	WIN Entertainment Centre	3,097	boxscore
8/02/2008	Gold Coast Blaze	81–88	Sydney Kings	Gold Coast Convention Centre	4,612	boxscore
9/02/2008	Melbourne Tigers	132–104	South Dragons	State Netball and Hockey Centre	3,500	boxscore
9/02/2008	West Sydney Razorbacks	106–111	Wollongong Hawks	State Sports Centre	2,217	boxscore
9/02/2008	Sydney Kings	113–84	Singapore Slingers	Sydney Entertainment Centre	3,897	boxscore
9/02/2008	Adelaide 36ers	113–104	Cairns Taipans	Adelaide Arena	7,009	boxscore
9/02/2008	Townsville Crocodiles	117–100	Brisbane Bullets	Townsville Entertainment Centre	4,859	boxscore

=== Round 22 ===
Date	Home	Score	Away	Venue	Crowd	Boxscore
13/02/2008	Wollongong Hawks	95–116	Cairns Taipans	WIN Entertainment Centre	3,046	boxscore
13/02/2008	Sydney Kings	103–93	New Zealand Breakers	Sydney Entertainment Centre	3,983	boxscore
13/02/2008	Gold Coast Blaze	69–90	Perth Wildcats	Gold Coast Convention Centre	3,303	boxscore
13/02/2008	Singapore Slingers	97–126	Adelaide 36ers	Singapore Indoor Stadium	3,000	boxscore
15/02/2008	Townsville Crocodiles	101–81	Gold Coast Blaze	Townsville Entertainment Centre	4,403	boxscore
16/02/2008	South Dragons	81–88	Sydney Kings	Vodafone Arena	4,312	boxscore
16/02/2008	West Sydney Razorbacks	97–117	Melbourne Tigers	State Sports Centre	2,562	boxscore
16/02/2008	Brisbane Bullets	129–98	Wollongong Hawks	Brisbane Convention Centre	3,549	boxscore
16/02/2008	Cairns Taipans	108–88	Townsville Crocodiles	Cairns Convention Centre	5,203	boxscore
16/02/2008	Perth Wildcats	98–85	New Zealand Breakers	Challenge Stadium	4,300	boxscore

== Ladder ==
Pos	2007–08 NBL season											
Pos	Team	Pld	W	L	PCT	Last 5	Streak	Home	Away	PF	PA	PP
1	Sydney Kings	30	27	3	90.00%	5–0	W8	14–1	13–2	3058	2721	112.39%
2	Melbourne Tigers	30	22	8	73.33%	3–2	W2	12–3	10–5	3093	2904	106.51%
3	Brisbane Bullets	30	20	10	66.67%	3–2	W1	13–2	7–8	3407	3145	108.33%
4	Perth Wildcats	30	18	12	60.00%	3–2	W3	12–3	6–9	2908	2731	106.48%
5	Townsville Crocodiles	30	17	13	56.67%	4–1	L1	12–3	5–10	2961	2927	101.16%
6	Cairns Taipans^{1}	30	16	14	53.33%	3–2	W2	10–5	6–9	2927	2849	102.74%
7	New Zealand Breakers^{1}	30	16	14	53.33%	3–2	L2	11–4	6–9	3026	3059	98.92%
8	Gold Coast Blaze	30	15	15	50.00%	1–4	L3	10–5	5–10	2865	2892	99.07%
9	Adelaide 36ers	30	14	16	46.67%	4–1	W2	9–6	5–10	3130	3124	100.19%
10	West Sydney Razorbacks	30	10	20	33.33%	0–5	L6	6–9	4–11	3097	3248	95.35%
11	Wollongong Hawks	30	9	21	30.00%	1–4	L2	7–8	2–13	2928	3128	93.61%
12	Singapore Slingers	30	6	24	20.00%	1–4	L2	5–10	1–14	2829	3207	88.21%
13	South Dragons	30	5	25	16.67%	1–4	L2	4–11	1–14	2904	3198	90.81%

Updated to match(es) played on 16 February 2008. Source: NBL.com.au

The NBL tie-breaker system as outlined in the NBL Rules and Regulations states that in the case of an identical win–loss record, the results in games played between the teams will determine order of seeding.

^{1}Cairns Taipans won Head-to-Head (2-1).

== Finals ==
=== Playoff bracket ===
Elimination Finals
5	Townsville Crocodiles	97
8	Gold Coast Blaze	89
6	Cairns Taipans	78
7	New Zealand Breakers	100

Quarterfinals
4	Perth Wildcats	96
5	Townsville Crocodiles	78
3	Brisbane Bullets	106
7	New Zealand Breakers	89

Semifinals
1	Sydney Kings	101	85	109
4	Perth Wildcats	98	94	77
2	Melbourne Tigers	116	115	X
3	Brisbane Bullets	98	112	X

Grand Final
1	Sydney Kings	95	93	87	90	73
2	Melbourne Tigers	74	104	89	87	85

=== Elimination Finals ===
Date	Home	Score	Away	Venue	Crowd	Boxscore
20/02/2008	Townsville Crocodiles	97–89	Gold Coast Blaze	Townsville Entertainment Centre	3,618	boxscore
21/02/2008	Cairns Taipans	78–100	New Zealand Breakers	Cairns Convention Centre	4,513	boxscore
22/02/2008	Perth Wildcats	96–78	Townsville Crocodiles	Challenge Stadium	4,300	boxscore
23/02/2008	Brisbane Bullets	106–89	New Zealand Breakers	Brisbane Convention Centre	2,787	boxscore

=== Semi-finals ===
Date	Home	Score	Away	Venue	Crowd	Boxscore
25/02/2008	Sydney Kings	101–98	Perth Wildcats	Sydney Entertainment Centre	2,640	boxscore
27/02/2008	Melbourne Tigers	116–98	Brisbane Bullets	State Netball and Hockey Centre	2,640	boxscore
27/02/2008	Perth Wildcats	94–85	Sydney Kings	Challenge Stadium	4,400	boxscore
28/02/2008	Brisbane Bullets	112–115	Melbourne Tigers	Brisbane Convention Centre	2,653	boxscore
1/03/2008	Sydney Kings	109–77	Perth Wildcats	Sydney Entertainment Centre	4,057	boxscore

=== Grand Final ===
Date	Home	Score	Away	Venue	Crowd	Boxscore
5/03/2008	Sydney Kings	95–74	Melbourne Tigers	Sydney Entertainment Centre	3,208	boxscore
7/03/2008	Melbourne Tigers	104–93	Sydney Kings	State Netball and Hockey Centre	3,500	boxscore
9/03/2008	Sydney Kings	87–89	Melbourne Tigers	Sydney Entertainment Centre	6,009	boxscore
12/03/2008	Melbourne Tigers	87–90	Sydney Kings	State Netball and Hockey Centre	3,500	boxscore
14/03/2008	Sydney Kings	73–85	Melbourne Tigers	Sydney Entertainment Centre	10,244	boxscore

== All Star Game ==
Fox Sports

12 December 2007
19:00

boxscore

Aussie All-Stars	146–141	World All-Stars
Scoring by quarter: 37–28, 38–38, 38–37, 33–38
Pts: Black 27; Rebs: Jawai 12; Asts: Ingles 8		Pts: Redhage 23; Rebs: Ballinger, Grizzard 8 Asts: Williams 8
Aussie All-Stars win, 146–141

State Netball and Hockey Centre, Melbourne
Attendance: 3,500

=== Most Valuable Player ===
- Nathan Jawai (Cairns Taipans)

== 2007–08 NBL statistics leaders ==
Category	Player	Team	Stat
Points per game	Ebi Ere	Brisbane Bullets	26.0
Rebounds per game	Chris Anstey	Melbourne Tigers	12.0
Assists per game	Rashad Phillips	Perth Wildcats	7.5
Steals per game	Orien Greene	New Zealand Breakers	2.88
Blocks per game	Chris Anstey	Melbourne Tigers	1.97
Field goal percentage	Tim Behrendorff	New Zealand Breakers	60.0%
Free throw percentage	Michael Cedar	Townsville Crocodiles	91.3%
Three-point field goal percentage	Daniel Jackson	Wollongong Hawks	52.4%

== NBL awards ==
- Most Valuable Player: Chris Anstey, Melbourne Tigers
- Rookie of the Year: Nathan Jawai, Cairns Taipans
- Best Defensive Player: Chris Anstey, Melbourne Tigers
- Best Sixth Man: Dontaye Draper, Sydney Kings
- Most Improved Player: Cameron Tragardh, Wollongong Hawks
- Coach of the Year: Brian Goorjian, Sydney Kings
- All-NBL First Team:
  - Ebi Ere – Brisbane Bullets
  - Chris Anstey – Melbourne Tigers
  - Mark Worthington – Sydney Kings
  - Kirk Penney – New Zealand Breakers
  - Shawn Redhage – Perth Wildcats
- All-NBL Second Team:
  - Nathan Jawai – Cairns Taipans
  - Adam Ballinger – Adelaide 36ers
  - Corey Williams – Townsville Crocodiles
  - C. J. Bruton – Brisbane Bullets
  - James Harvey – Gold Coast Blaze
- All-NBL Third Team:
  - Kavossy Franklin – Wollongong Hawks
  - Paul Rogers – Perth Wildcats
  - Julius Hodge – Adelaide 36ers
  - Dontaye Draper – Sydney Kings
  - Darnell Hinson – West Sydney Razorbacks

== TV coverage ==
- Australia – Fox Sports (Live coverage) & Nine Network (Delayed coverage)
- New Zealand – Sky Sport & Māori Television
- Singapore – Sling HD
- Philippines – Basketball TV
