= Ebi Ere =

American-Nigerian basketball player (born 1981)

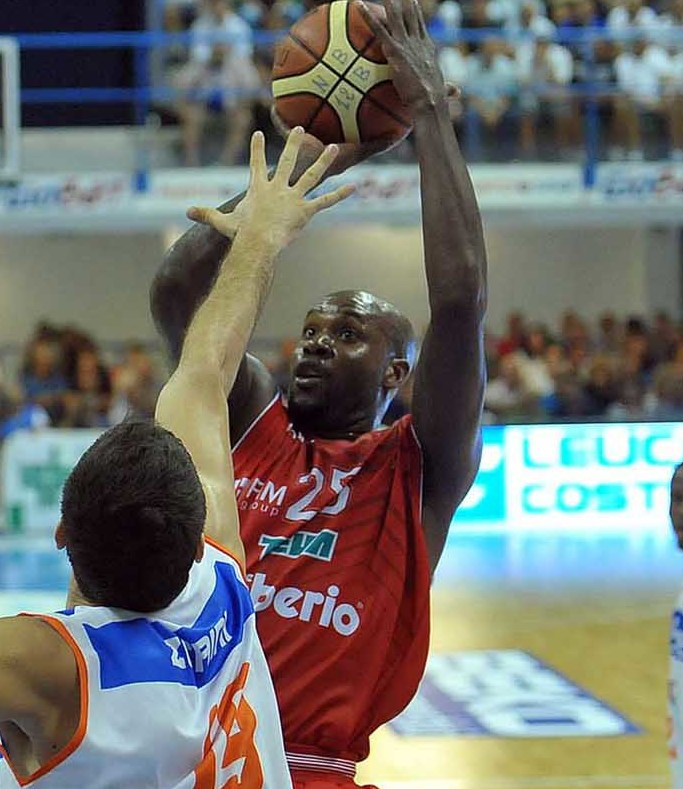
- Ere with Cimberio Varese in 2012

Personal information
- Born: August 2, 1981 (age 45) Tulsa, Oklahoma, U.S.
- Listed height: 6 ft 5 in (1.96 m)
- Listed weight: 212 lb (96 kg)

Career information
- High school: McLain (Tulsa, Oklahoma)
- College: Barton CC (1999–2001); Oklahoma (2001–2003)
- NBA draft: 2003: undrafted
- Playing career: 2003–2018
- Position: Shooting guard / small forward
- Number: 25

Career history
- 2003–2004: Sydney Kings
- 2005: Oklahoma Storm
- 2005–2006: Liège Basket
- 2006–2008: Brisbane Bullets
- 2007–2009: Gigantes de Carolina
- 2008–2009: Melbourne Tigers
- 2009–2011: Pepsi Caserta
- 2011–2012: Obradoiro CAB
- 2012–2014: Cimberio Varese
- 2014: Caciques de Humacao
- 2014–2015: Élan Béarnais Pau-Orthez
- 2015: Vaqueros de Bayamón
- 2015–2016: Adelaide 36ers
- 2016: Capitanes de Arecibo
- 2016–2017: SLUC Nancy
- 2018: Defensor Sporting Club

Career highlights
- 2× NBL champion (2004, 2007); 2× All-NBL First Team (2008, 2009); All-NBL Second Team (2004); NBL scoring champion (2008); 2× BSN All-Star (2007, 2008); All-USBL First Team (2005); Big 12 Newcomer of the Year (2002)

Ebikekeme Hasain Fere “Ebi” Ere (/ˈɛbi əˈrɑː/; born August 2, 1981) is an American-Nigerian former professional basketball player.

== High school and college career ==
Ere attended McLain High School and played two seasons of junior college basketball for Barton Community College. He then played two seasons of Division I college basketball for the Oklahoma Sooners between 2001 and 2003. In his two-year career at Oklahoma, he averaged 13.7 points and 5.3 rebounds in 70 games. He and teammate Hollis Price led the Sooners to the Final Four in 2002 where they lost to the Indiana Hoosiers in the national semi-final.

== Professional career ==
=== Early years ===
Ere spent his rookie season in Australia playing for the Sydney Kings during the 2003–04 NBL season. He helped the Kings win their second straight championship playing alongside the likes of C. J. Bruton and Matthew Nielsen. In 40 games for the Kings, Ere averaged 19.6 points, 5.7 rebounds, 1.6 assists and 1.2 steals per game.

Ere's next playing stint came in 2005 with the Oklahoma Storm of the United States Basketball League (USBL). He averaged 18.7 points and 4.1 rebounds in 23 games and earned All-USBL first team honors.

Following the 2005 USBL season, Ere signed with Liège Basket of Belgium for the 2005–06 season. In 30 games for Liège, he averaged 14.2 points, 3.0 rebounds, 1.5 assists and 1.4 steals per game.

In 2006, Ere returned to Australia and joined the Brisbane Bullets for the 2006–07 NBL season. He made it two championships in two NBL seasons as he led the Bullets to secure the title with a 3–1 grand final series win over the Melbourne Tigers. In 39 games for the Bullets in 2006–07, he averaged 17.3 points, 4.9 rebounds and 2.3 assists per game. Following the NBL season, he joined Gigantes de Carolina of the Baloncesto Superior Nacional.

Ere re-signed with the Brisbane Bullets for the 2007–08 season and earned himself All-NBL first team honors. In 32 games for the Bullets in 2007–08, he averaged a career-high 26.0 points, 6.0 rebounds and 2.1 assists per game. He again joined Gigantes de Carolina during the NBL off-season.

With the Bullets folding following the 2007–08 season, Ere reportedly signed with the South Dragons for the 2008–09 season but decided instead to pursue an NBA contract. When that fell through, he was unable to join the Dragons after the club signed Tremmell Darden rather than waiting for Ere. Ere subsequently signed with cross-town rivals, the Melbourne Tigers. He earned All-NBL first team honors for a second straight year and helped lead the Tigers back to the Grand Final where they were ironically defeated by the South Dragons 3 games to 2. In 37 games for the Tigers, he averaged 20.7 points, 4.9 rebounds and 2.2 assists per game. For a third straight year, he played for Gigantes de Carolina during the NBL off-season.

=== Italy and Spain ===
In July 2009, Ere signed a one-year deal with Pepsi Caserta of the Lega Basket Serie A. He led his team to the semi-finals and averaged 15.1 points and 3.7 rebounds in 38 games.

In July 2010, Ere re-signed with Caserta for the 2010–11 season. In 30 league games for Caserta in 2010–11, he averaged 14.1 points and 3.2 rebounds per game.

On August 14, 2011, Ere signed with Obradoiro CAB of Spain for the 2011–12 season. His numbers dropped while playing for Obradoiro, averaging a career-low 8.1 points per game in the very competitive Liga ACB.

On June 20, 2012, Ere signed a one-year deal (with the option of a second) with Cimberio Varese, returning to Italy for a second stint. He was named team captain in 2012–13 and in 39 games for Cimberio, Ere averaged 13.6 points, 4.9 rebounds, 1.2 assists and 1.0 steals per game.

In July 2013, Ere opted in with Cimberio for the 2013–14 season. In 30 league games for Cimberio in 2013–14, he averaged 11.8 points, 4.2 rebounds and 1.9 assists per game.

=== Later years ===
On May 24, 2014, Ere signed with Caciques de Humacao of the Baloncesto Superior Nacional as a replacement for Zach Graham. He played 12 games for Humacao and averaged 19.0 points, 5.4 rebounds, 3.6 assists and 1.4 steals per game.

In December 2014, Ere signed a short-term contract with Élan Béarnais Pau-Orthez of the LNB Pro A. On January 11, 2015, his contract was extended for a further two months. With the return of Marko Simonović from injury, Ere parted ways with the club on March 16. In 14 games for Pau-Orthez, he averaged 10.0 points, 3.4 rebounds, 2.1 assists and 1.0 steals per game. Two days later, he signed with Vaqueros de Bayamón of the Baloncesto Superior Nacional. In 32 games for Bayamón, he averaged 16.0 points, 4.3 rebounds and 1.8 assists per game.

On August 27, 2015, Ere signed with the Adelaide 36ers for the 2015–16 NBL season. Less than a month later, Ere sustained a calf injury which ruled him out of the 2015 Pre-season Blitz tournament. In his 36ers debut on October 7 in the team's season-opening game against the New Zealand Breakers, Ere scored all 13 of his points in the first half to help the 36ers lead 51–26 at half time. The 36ers went on to win the game 90–71. On January 30, 2016, he had a season-best game with 28 points and six three-pointers in a 104–90 win over the Illawarra Hawks. He appeared in all 28 games for the fifth-placed 36ers in 2015–16, averaging 10.8 points, 2.3 rebounds and 1.1 assists per game.

On March 7, 2016, Ere signed with Capitanes de Arecibo for the 2016 BSN season.

On September 2, 2016, Ere signed with French club SLUC Nancy Basket for the 2016–17 season.

On January 17, 2018, Ere signed with Defensor Sporting Club of the Liga Uruguaya de Basketball.

== National team career ==
Ere was among those selected to play for the Nigerian national team in the 2006 FIBA World Championship in Japan. He scored a total of 67 points (average of 11.2ppg in six games), which was third behind Gabe Muoneke and Ime Udoka.

In 2009, Ere competed for Nigeria at the FIBA Africa Championship where he averaged 11.3 points in seven games.
