= Kombat =

Settlement in Otjozondjupa Region, Namibia

- Mining settlement
- Location in Namibia
- Coordinates: 19°43′S 17°43′E
- Country: Namibia
- Region: Otjozondjupa Region
- Established: 1900
- Time zone: UTC+2 (South African Standard Time)
- Climate: BSh

Kombat is a mine and its associated settlement at the southern margin of the Otavi Mountain Range in northern Namibia. It is situated 37 kilometres (23 mi) East of Otavi on the B8 to Grootfontein. Kombat at its peak had over 1,000 inhabitants. As of 2015 it is almost abandoned, although Kombat Primary School still operates at reduced capacity, and a clinic is serving the remaining inhabitants.

In the vicinity, the Welwitchia Health Training Center brought life to the known ghost town of Kombat. It offers a Bachelors of Nursing Science program, Enrolled Nursing Science and Midwifery as well as a Bachelor of Information and Communication Technology.

There are recreational facilities such as Kombat Lodge where visitors and people of the town can enjoy themselves.

== Kombat mine ==
Minerals were discovered near Kombat in 1850. Around the year 1900, Kombat Mine was opened to extract copper. It was operated by Tsumeb Corporation Limited until the 1970s and by Ongopolo Mining as from 1999. In 2006 Ongopolo and the mine were taken over by Weatherly International PLC, a mining house based in London. Soon thereafter in 2007 the mine flooded, was abandoned, and was dormant for several years. In 2015 Namibian businessman Knowledge Katti acquired the town and the mine for 50 million N$, allegedly with the intention of re-selling it to the Namibian government at a handsome profit.

In November 2021, the Canada-based Trigon metals, Inc announced it had secured $5 million in financing from IXM to reopen the Kombat mine, agreeing to sell concentrate from the mine to IXM for distribution. Mining resumed the next month.

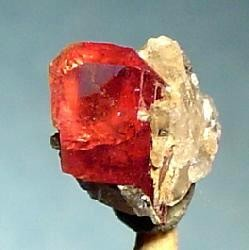
Nambulite, a very rare gem, from Kombat Mine. The sample size is 0.7 x 0.6 x 0.4 cm.

Besides copper, there are sizeable deposits of lead and silver. The mine is known for a host of rare minerals, including Nambulite and glaucochroite.

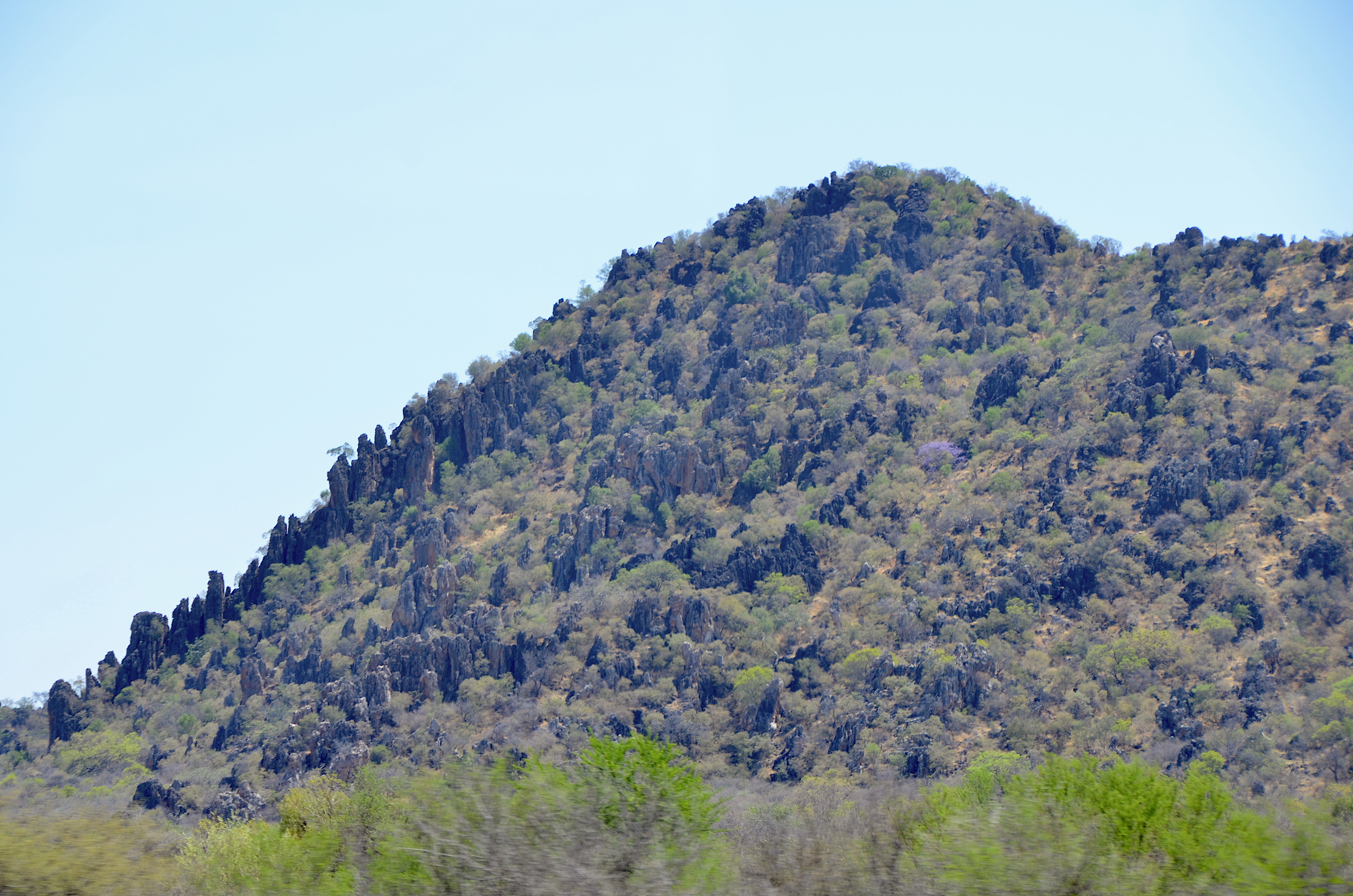
Carbonate rocks at Kombat (2014)
