= Nambulite =

Single chain inosilicate mineral

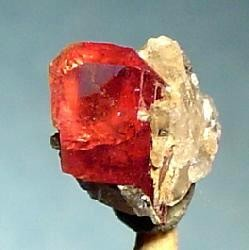
- Gem quality nambulite from the Kombat Mine near Otavi, northern Namibia (size: 0.7 × 0.6 × 0.4 cm)

General
- Category: Inosilicate
- Formula: (Li,Na)Mn_{4}Si_{5}O_{14}(OH)
- IMA symbol: Nbl
- Strunz classification: 9.DK.05
- Crystal system: Triclinic
- Crystal class: Pinacoidal (1̅) (same H-M symbol)
- Space group: P1̅
- Unit cell: a = 7.621, b = 11.761 c = 6.731 Å; α = 92.77° β = 95.08°, γ = 106.87°; Z = 2

Identification
- Formula mass: 612.13 g/mol
- Color: Reddish orange brown
- Crystal habit: Prismatic
- Twinning: infrequent
- Cleavage: {001} perfect, {100} distinct, {010} distinct
- Tenacity: Brittle
- Mohs scale hardness: 6.5
- Luster: Vitreous – adamantine
- Streak: Pale yellow
- Diaphaneity: Transparent to translucent
- Specific gravity: 3.51
- Optical properties: Biaxial (+)
- Refractive index: n_{α} = 1.707 n_{β} = 1.710 n_{γ} = 1.730
- Birefringence: δ = 0.023
- Pleochroism: Weak
- 2V angle: (calculated) 44°, (measured) 30°
- Dispersion: r > v weak
- Other characteristics: the Li analogue of natronambulite

Nambulite is a lithium bearing manganese silicate mineral with the chemical formula (Li,Na)Mn_{4}Si_{5}O_{14}(OH). It is named after the mineralogist Matsuo Nambu (born 1917) of Tohoko University, Japan, who studies manganese minerals. It was first discovered in the Funakozawa Mine of northeastern Japan in a metasedimentary manganese ore.

Nambulite is formed from the reaction between a hydrothermal solution and rhodonite, and commonly creates veins in the host rock. It has little economic value other than as a collector's gem.

It belongs to the triclinic-pinacoidal crystal system (or triclinic-normal), meaning that it has three axes of unequal length (a, b, c), all intersecting at oblique angles with each other (none of the angles are equal to 90°). It belongs to the crystal class 1̅, meaning that any point on the crystal that is rotated 360° and then completely inverted will meet with an equal (but opposite) point on the crystal (see centrosymmetry). Its space group is P 1̅.

The three axes (a, b, c) have different indices of refraction, n_{a} = 1.707, n_{b} = 1.710, n_{c} = 1.730. The index of refraction (RI) can be defined as n = c_{air}/c_{mineral}, where "n" is the index of refraction and "c" is the speed of light. The maximum birefringence is .023, the difference between the highest (n_{c} = 1.730) and lowest (n_{a} = 1.707) indices of refraction within the mineral.

In a medium with an index of refraction equaling 1.53, Nambulite has a calculated relief of 1.71–1.73, giving it a moderate to high relief. Relief is a measure of the difference between the index of refraction of the mineral and that of the medium (often Canada balsam or other epoxy with an RI of around 1.53–1.54).

Nambulite is an anisotropic crystal, where the velocity of light that passes through the crystal varies depending on the crystallographic direction. In contrast, an isotropic crystal includes all isometric crystals, and the velocity of light is equal in all directions. The mineral exhibits slight pleochroism. Pleochroism is an optical property observed when the mineral is viewed under the microscope in plane polarized light, and when it the stage of the microscope is rotated the observed colors change. The color change is due to different wavelengths being absorbed in different directions, and the color of the mineral depends on the crystallographic orientation.
