= Saville Australia =

Australian property developer

- Company type: Private
- Industry: Property development
- Fate: Placed in receivership in 2009
- Headquarters: Perth, Western Australia, Australia
- Area served: Western Australia
- Products: Residential apartment developments Waikiki Blue; Saffron Apartments; Altus Luxury Apartments; Palazzo Mindarie

Saville Australia was a privately owned property developer in Australia. It held a variety of residential apartment projects.

Based in Perth, Saville Australia undertook development projects in Western Australia. In 2009 Saville was placed in receivership

Saville Australia's portfolio was valued at more than $1.7 billion and included the $1.2 billion Capital Square development, which planned to redevelop the historic former Emu Brewery site in the Perth central business district into a residential and commercial precinct housing over 500 residents and 60,000m^{2} of office space. The site was bought by AAIG Pty Ltd in 2010 whose redevelopment of the site was completed in 2017.

Saville Australia's portfolio also included Waikiki Blue on the Safety Bay foreshore, Saffron and Altus Luxury Apartments in Perth's CBD and Palazzo Mindarie in Mindarie. The Saffron Apartment tower was completed, but the Waikiki Blue, Altus and Mindarie developments were not built before the company went into receivership.

In 2006 Saville attracted criticism from Prime Minister John Howard for banning tourists taking photos in the vicinity of the popular Southgate precinct in Southbank, Victoria.

In 2007 Saville became the naming rights sponsor of the Perth Wildcats, a professional basketball team playing in the National Basketball League. It withdrew its sponsorship of the team in 2009.
