= Al Westover =

American basketball player and coach

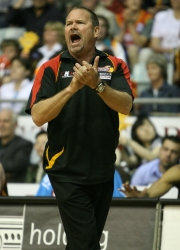

Personal information
- Born: 7 September 1954 (age 72) Napa Valley, California
- Listed height: 187 cm (6 ft 2 in)
- Listed weight: 85 kg (187 lb)

Career information
- High school: Justin-Siena (Napa, California)
- College: Pacific (1972–1976)
- NBA draft: 1976: undrafted
- Playing career: 1978–1987
- Position: Guard

Career history

Playing
- 1978–1984: Melbourne Tigers
- 1985: Geelong Supercats
- 1986–1987: Dandenong Rangers

Coaching
- 1992–2005: Melbourne Tigers (asst.)
- 2005–2011: Melbourne Tigers
- 2011–2013: Shiga Lakestars

Career highlights
- NBL Coach of the Year (2006); 2x NBL champion (2006, 2008)

Alan William Westover (born 7 September 1954) is a professional basketball coach best known for his tenure with the Melbourne Tigers in the National Basketball League (NBL), where he coached the team to four consecutive Grand Finals, winning two championships, and being the second winningest coach in league history (based on winning percentage over 100 games coached). Westover also played for the Melbourne Tigers in their inaugural season in the NBL.

Westover was the coach of the Shiga Lakestars of the Basketball Japan (BJ) League in Ōtsu City, Shiga. In his first year with the Lakestars, Westover helped the club reach their highest number of wins in their seven-year history, and to the second round of the play-offs where they lost to eventual champions, Okinawa.

Westover has a son (Boden) who also played professionally for the Melbourne Tigers.

== Head coaching record ==
Coaching History • 28 years coaching experience – Over 1500 games coached • VBA/SEABL – 511 games as Head Coach • VJBL/Metro League – 413 junior games Head Coach • NBL 6 seasons – Head Coach • NBL 15 seasons – Assistant Coach

Senior Head Coaching Achievements • NBL Champions – 2006, 2008 – Melbourne Tigers • NBL Runner-up – 2007, 2009 – Melbourne Tigers • NBL Head Coach – (Melbourne Tigers) Second winningest coach in NBL history (based on winning percentage over 100 games coached) • SEABL Champions – 1989 – Ballarat Miners • National Champions – Victoria U20 State Team – 1994 • VBA Champions – 1989 (Ballarat Miners) and 1992, 1994, 1997, 1998 (Melbourne Tigers) • Big V Champions – 2008, 2009 • Youth League 2 – Coach of the Year, 2017 • Shiga Lakestars (Japan) 2011/13 – Best two seasons in team history & 2011/12 BJ League All-Star Coach • Melbourne Tigers Hall of Fame, class of 2017

Junior Head Coaching Achievements • VJBL Under 14 Champions (state/classic/nationals) – 2000 • VJBL Under 16 Champions (state/classic) – 2002 • VJBL Under 18 Champions (classic) – 2004 • VJBL Under 20 Champions (state) – 1993, 1994, 1995, 1999, 2000, 2001, 2005, 2006
