= Eventfinda Stadium =

Stadium in Auckland, New Zealand

Coordinates: 36°47′0″S 174°44′39″E

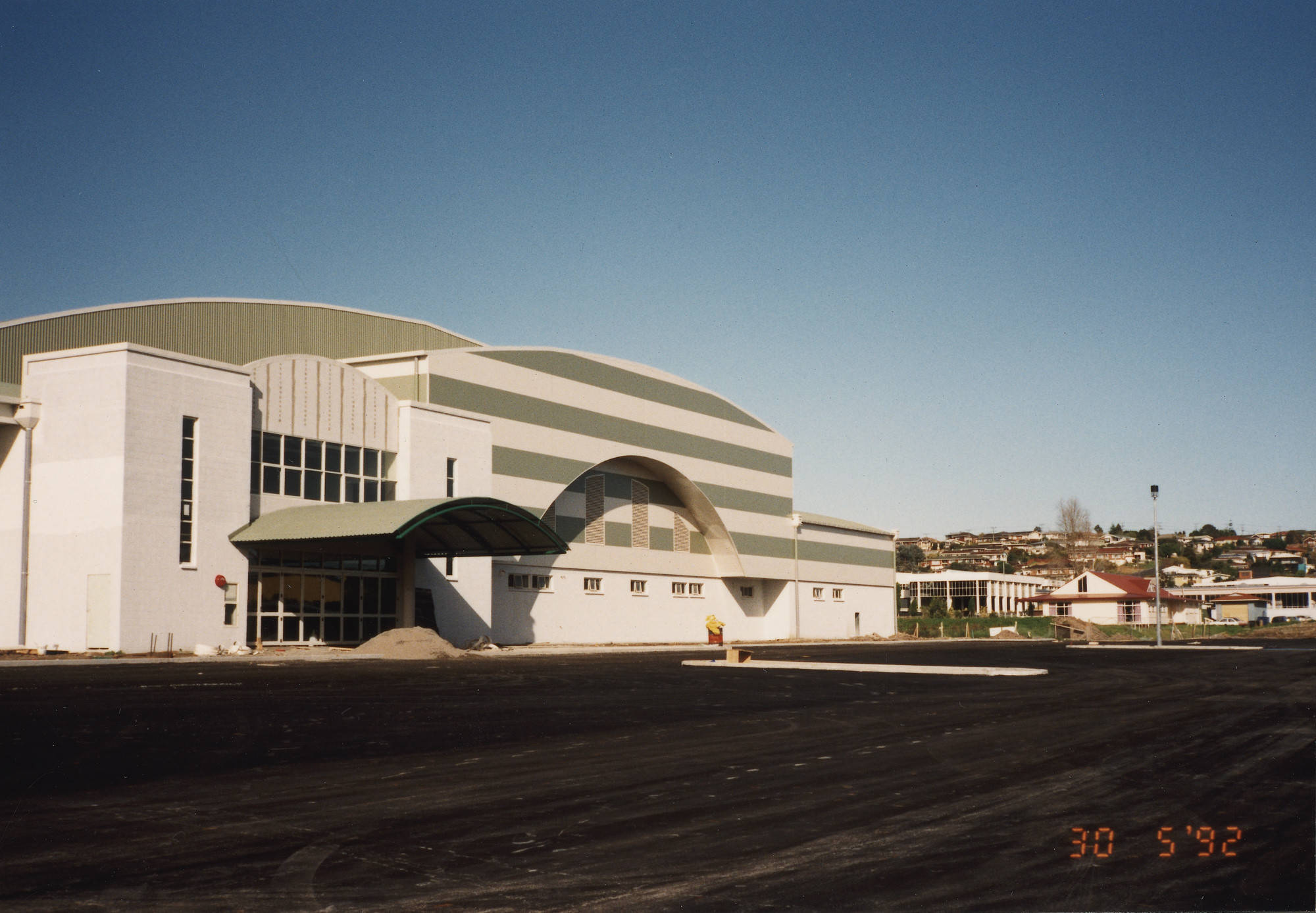
- The stadium in 1992, then known as the North Shore Sports and Leisure Centre
- Interactive map of Eventfinda Stadium
- Former names: North Shore Events Centre (1992–2018)
- Address: 17 Silverfield Ln; Auckland 0627; New Zealand
- Location: Wairau Valley
- Owner: North Shore Events Centre Trust Board
- Capacity: 5,000

Construction
- Groundbreaking: 1991
- Opened: September 1992
- Cost: NZ$6 million

Tenants
- New Zealand Breakers (NBL) (2003–2019; 2024–present); Auckland Tuatara (NZNBL) (2021–present)

Website
- Venue Website

Eventfinda Stadium (known from 1992–2018 as the North Shore Events Centre) is an indoor arena located in Wairau Valley, on the North Shore of Auckland, New Zealand. The arena opened in 1992 and has a capacity of 4,179.

It was previously the home arena of the New Zealand Breakers, who play in the Australian National Basketball League. It is currently the home arena of the Auckland Tuatara, who compete in the New Zealand National Basketball League. It also hosts concerts, expos, trade shows, conferences, netball, MMA and boxing, cheerleading and dance events. It has also hosted the New Zealand Badminton Open for over 10 years.

== Major events ==
=== Basketball ===
In 2009, the arena hosted the final of the FIBA Under-19 World Championship. The final saw the United States defeat Greece 88–80.

=== Boxing ===
It has hosted a number of boxing events, the majority of them promoted by Shane Cameron. The most famous fight night was in November 2014 where Kali Meehan fought Shane Cameron for the WBA Pan African Heavyweight Title. Also on the card was the Super 8 Cruiserweight tournament. The event was promoted by John McRae and broadcast live on Pay-Per-View with Sky Arena in New Zealand and Main Event in Australia.

=== Concerts ===
On 25 September 2026, the arena hosted the Auckland leg of pop group Bini's Signals World Tour 2026.

=== Wheelchair rugby league ===
On 1 November 2024, the arena hosted the first wheelchair rugby league international match played by New Zealand. The match was the first in a two-match series against Australia. Both matches were played at the arena with Australia winning 98–4 and 110–8 for a 2–0 series victory.

=== Other Events ===
The arena has hosted The Retro Event gaming convention since 2024.

== Gallery ==
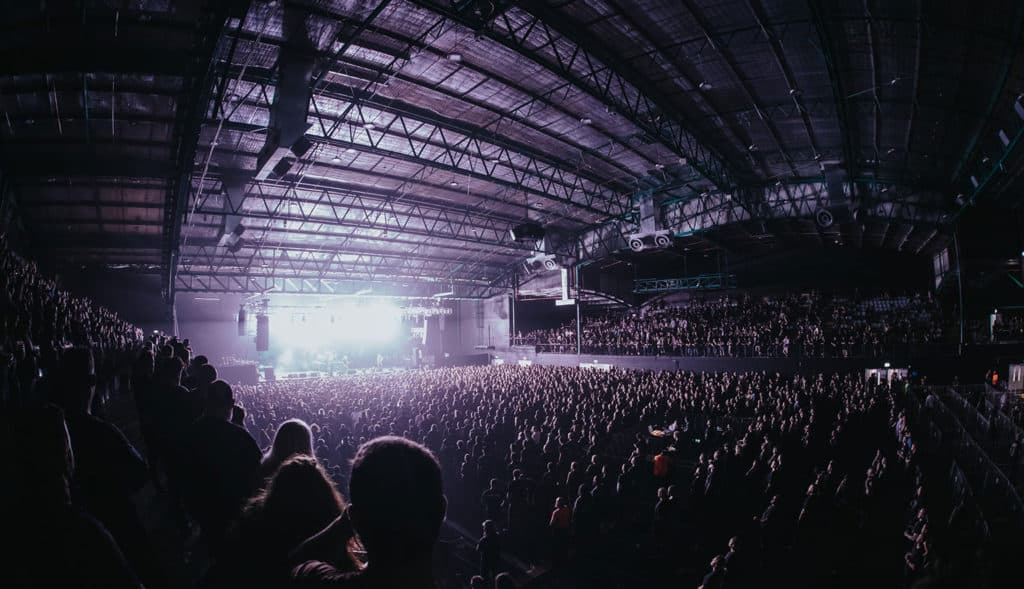
Interior of venue

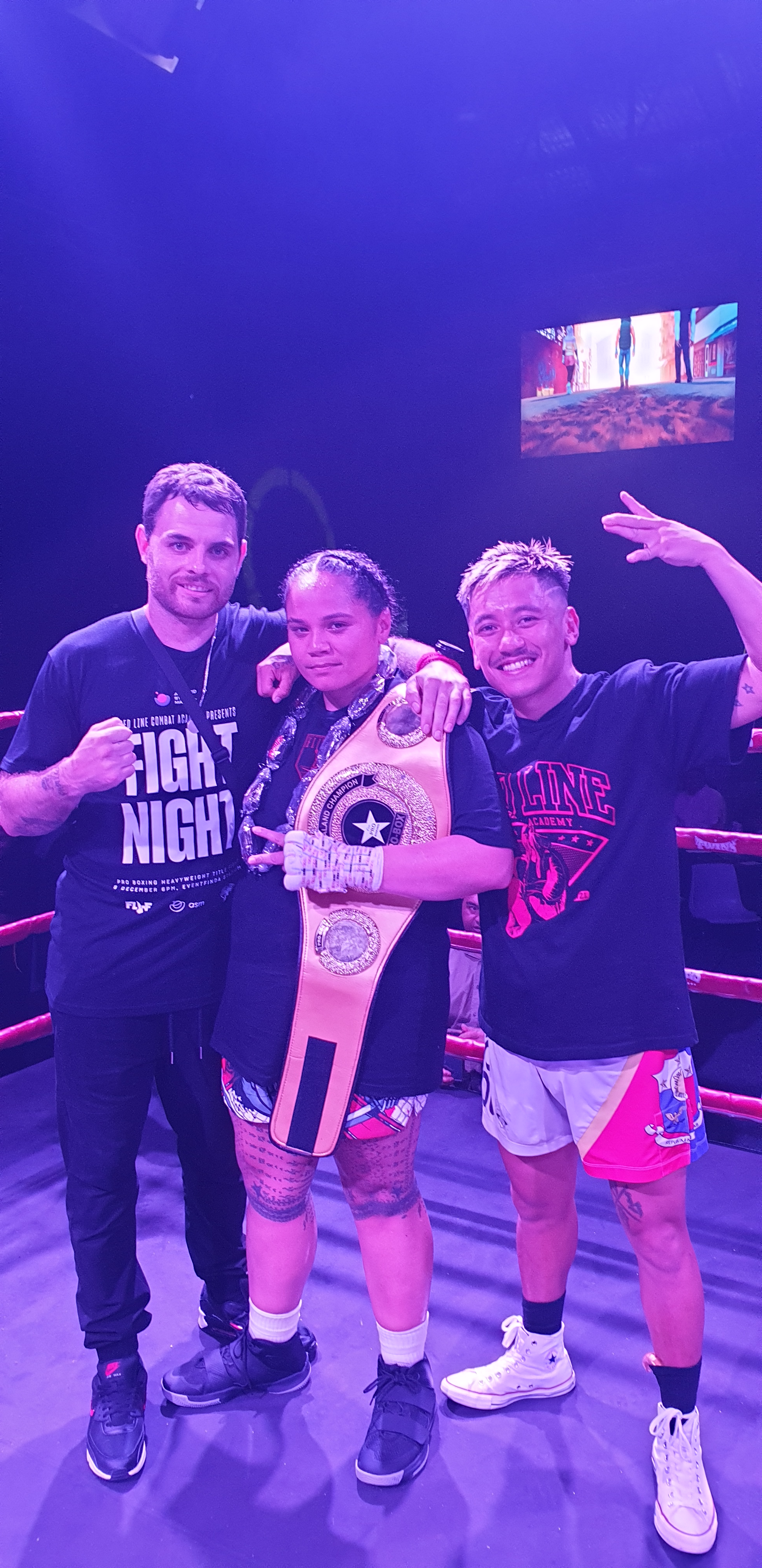
Alrie Meleisea winning the Pro Box NZ Women's New Zealand Heavyweight title in 2022

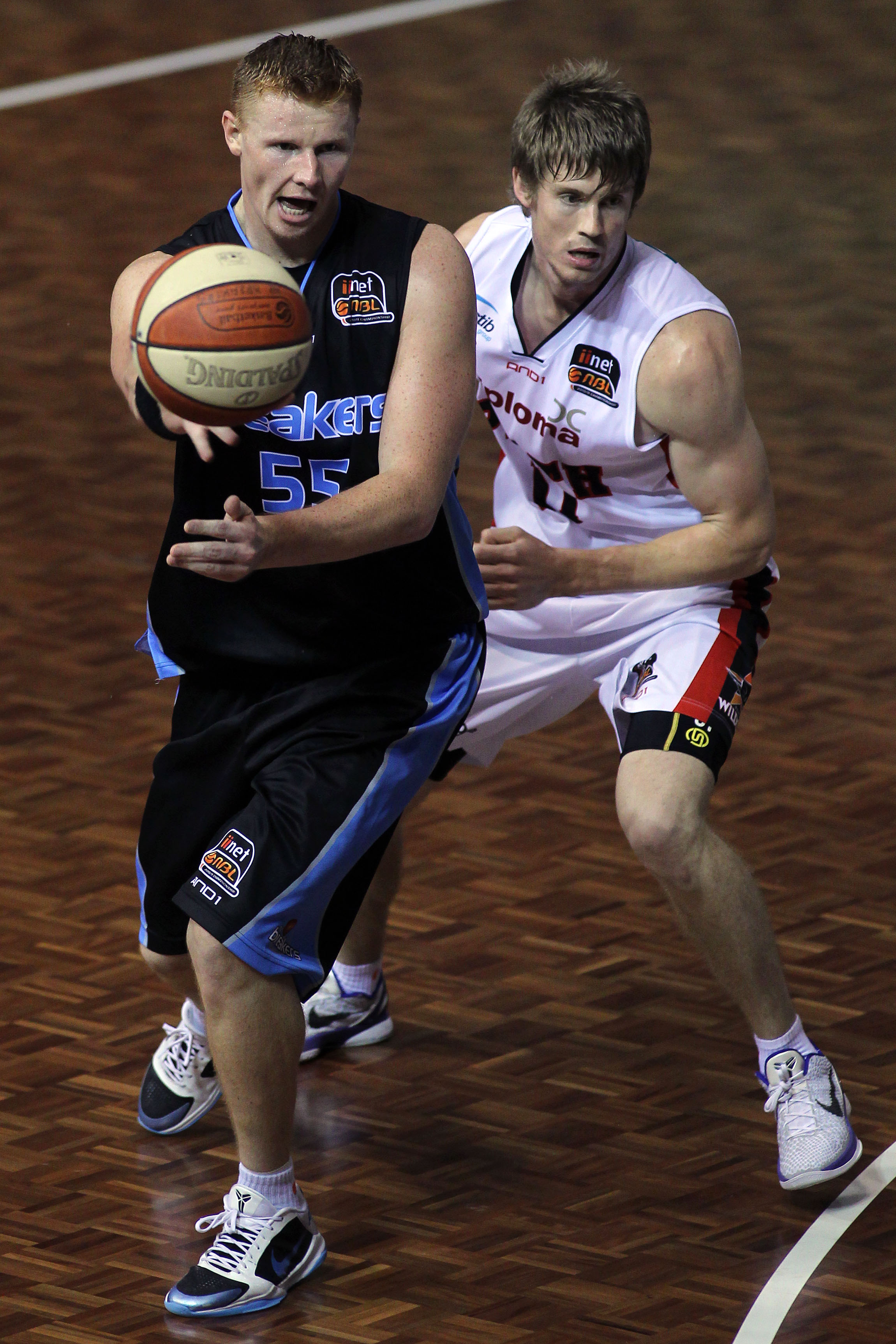
Gary Wilkinson and Cameron Tovey at the New Zealand Breakers and Perth Wildcats basketball match on 7 April 2011

| Preceded by SPC Vojvodina; Novi Sad | FIBA U-19 World Championship; Final Venue; 2009 | Succeeded by Arena Riga; Riga |
