= Basketball in Australia =

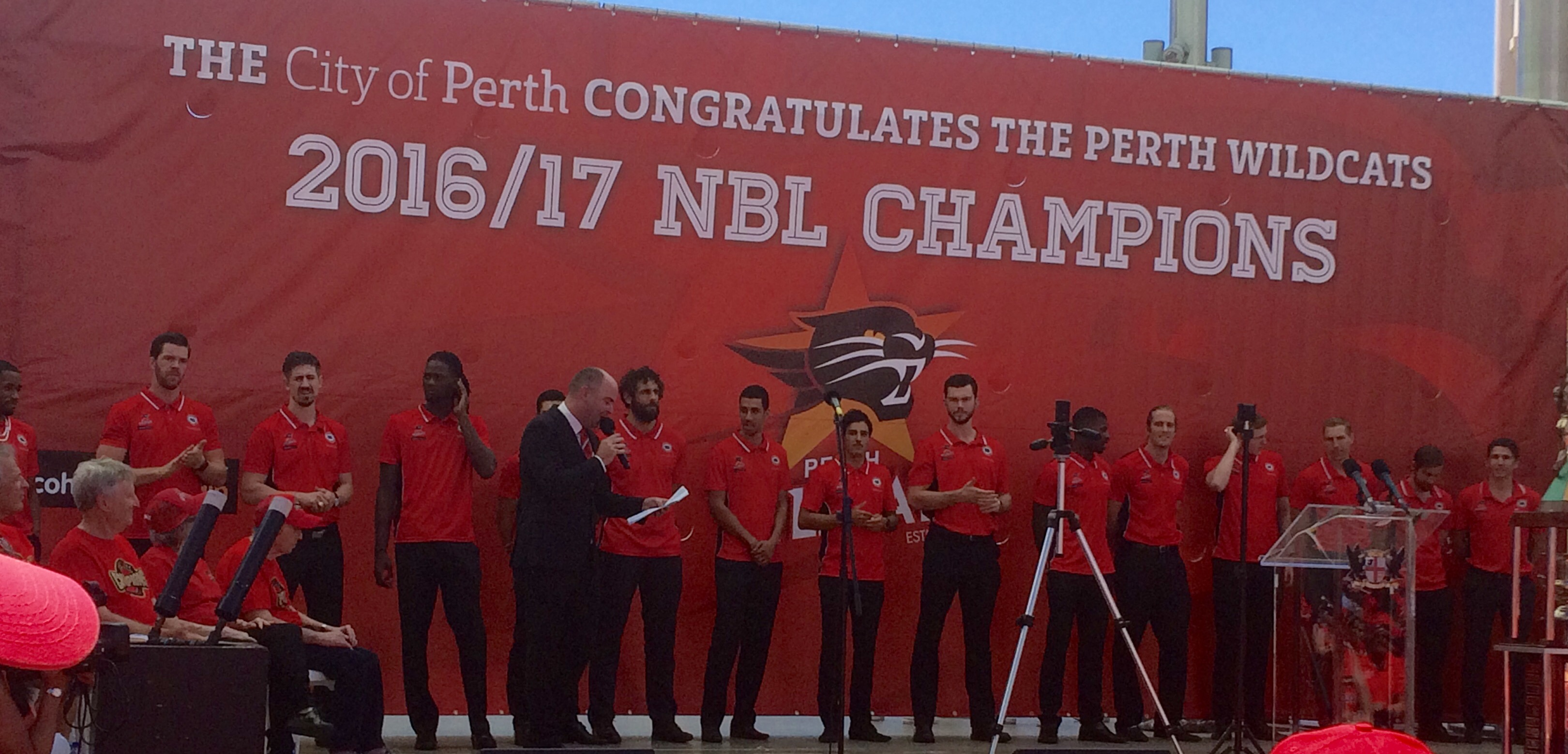
- Ten-time NBL champions, the Perth Wildcats
- Country: Australia
- Governing body: Basketball Australia
- National team: Basketball
- Nicknames: Boomers (Men); Opals (Women)
- First played: 23 February 1897, Adelaide, South Australia
- Registered players: 1,056,012 (adult); 325,261 (children)
- Clubs: 93 (Men); 90 (Women); 183 (Total)

National competitions
- List: Summer Olympics; FIBA Oceania Championship; FIBA Oceania Championship for Women; FIBA Basketball World Cup; FIBA Women's Basketball World Cup

Club competitions
- List: Professional; National Basketball League; Women's National Basketball League; Semi-professional; Big V; NBL1 Central; NBL1 North; NBL1 South; NBL1 West; NBL1 East

Audience records
- Single match: 17,514 (2019) NBL: Sydney Kings v. Illawarra Hawks (Sydney SuperDome)
- Season: 896,408 - 2019–20 NBL season

In Australia, basketball is a popular participation and spectator sport played both indoors and outdoors. According to AusPlay, in 2024, 1,056,012 Australian adults played basketball making it the second highest team participation sport in the country. Around 4.6% of Australian adults, and 6.7% of Australian children play basketball. Over a quarter of Australian basketballers are female.

Basketball in Australia experienced a golden age in the mid-1980s to the mid-1990s, during which the National Basketball League saw its halcyon days. However, its popularity, media attention, attendance, and corporate support deteriorated during the 2000s. From the mid-2010s, the sport saw renewed interest following a record number of Australians playing in the National Basketball Association (NBA) in the United States.

== History ==
The first press reference to a game of basketball in Australia is from The Adelaide Advertiser. The paper reported on Wednesday 17 February 1897 that the following Tuesday at the opening of Our Boys Institute, said to be the largest gymnasium in the colonies, OBI would play YMCA in the first exhibition of basketball in South Australia. There is no evidence of any game being played earlier elsewhere, thus the first game of basketball was played in Australia on Tuesday 23 February 1897. The game occurred six years after the invention of the sport on 21 December 1891 by Canadian James Naismith, a physical education professor and instructor at the International Young Men's Christian Association Training School (YMCA) in Springfield, Massachusetts. OBI and the YMCA continued to be at the forefront of the development of Adelaide basketball. More than 120 years later, basketball is one of the most popular participation sports in the country.

== National League ==
The National Basketball League (NBL), which began in 1979, is the top-level men's basketball competition in Australia. The sport experienced rapid growth in the 1980s with the influx of American players. National competition became popular in the major cities. By the late 1990s, basketball in Australia went into sharp decline. According to Adelaide 36ers championship coach Phil Smyth, Australian basketball administrators rested on their laurels during the 1990s. "They let the brand get damaged," Smyth said. "It's that old saying 'if you keep doing the same thing over and over again hoping for a different result, you're a fool — and basketball was foolish." During the 2000s, interest in the NBL dwindled, with many teams folding, audience attendance fluctuating, and the league's TV presence inconsistent.

In 2015, a record number of Australians playing in the NBA led to a renewed popularity in the sport and showed Australians still loved basketball but were unsure about the national version. However, by the late 2010s and early 2020s, renewed interest in the league saw all-time attendance records be broken.

== National teams ==
The Boomers are the men's basketball team which represents Australia in international competitions. As of 2022, the Boomers have won 19 FIBA Oceania Championships (no longer contested), one FIBA Asia Cup, one Commonwealth Games Gold Medal in 2006 and one Bronze Medal at the Olympic Games in Tokyo 2020 Olympics. Until winning the Bronze in Tokyo, their best finish being fourth place at the Olympics in 1988, 1996, 2000 and 2016, and fourth at the 2019 World Cup.

The women's national team is the Opals. They have won Olympic silver in 2000, 2004 and 2008, Olympic bronze in 1996 and 2012, as well as gold at the 2006 FIBA World Championship and bronze at the 1998, 2002 and 2014 World Cups.

== League system ==
Australian basketball league system
- Country: Australia
- Sport: Basketball
- Promotion and relegation: No

National system
- Federation: Basketball Australia
- Confederation: FIBA Oceania
- Top division: National Basketball League; Women's National Basketball League
- Second division: Big V; NBL1 Central; NBL1 East; NBL1 North; NBL1 South; NBL1 West

Men

| Level | Leagues | | | | | |
|---|---|---|---|---|---|---|
| 1 | National Basketball League; 10 teams (1 from New Zealand) | | | | | |
| 2 | Big V 8 teams | NBL1 Central; 10 teams | NBL1 East; 16 teams | NBL1 North; 16 teams | NBL1 South; 19 teams | NBL1 West; 14 teams |

Women

| Level | Leagues | | | | | |
|---|---|---|---|---|---|---|
| 1 | Women's National Basketball League; 8 teams | | | | | |
| 2 | Big V 8 teams | NBL1 Central; 10 teams | NBL1 East; 16 teams | NBL1 North; 16 teams | NBL1 South; 19 teams | NBL1 West; 13 teams |

== Australians in the NBA ==
The National Basketball Association (NBA) in the United States has a number of Australian players. The NBA also has a large following in Australia.

The majority of players on the roster for the Australia men's national basketball team (nicknamed the "Boomers") currently play in the NBA.

=== Current players ===
| Player | Team |
|---|---|
| Dyson Daniels | Atlanta Hawks |
| Alex Ducas | Oklahoma City Thunder |
| Dante Exum | Dallas Mavericks |
| Johnny Furphy | Indiana Pacers |
| Josh Giddey | Chicago Bulls |
| Josh Green | Charlotte Hornets |
| Joe Ingles | Minnesota Timberwolves |
| Kyrie Irving | Dallas Mavericks |
| Jock Landale | Houston Rockets |
| Jack McVeigh | Houston Rockets |
| Patty Mills | Utah Jazz |
| Duop Reath | Portland Trail Blazers |
| Ben Simmons | Brooklyn Nets |
| Matisse Thybulle | Portland Trail Blazers |
| Luke Travers | Cleveland Cavaliers |

== Attendances ==
| Season | Total | Average |
|---|---|---|
| 2024–25 NBL season | 1,024,176 | 7,063 |
| 2023–24 NBL season | 1,097,455 | 7,126 |
| 2022–23 NBL season | 970,704 | 6,303 |

The top 5 Australian basketball clubs by average home league attendance in the 2013-14 season:

| # | Club | Average |
|---|---|---|
| 1 | Perth Wildcats | 11,512 |
| 2 | Adelaide 36ers | 5,603 |
| 3 | Sydney Kings | 4,685 |
| 4 | Melbourne Tigers | 4,305 |
| 5 | Cairns Taipans | 4,010 |

Source: League page on Wikipedia
