= List of defunct National Basketball League (Australia) teams =

The following is a list of teams that no longer compete in the National Basketball League (NBL).

== Defunct teams ==
Club	Years in the NBL	History
Bankstown Bruins / West Sydney Westars	1979–1987	Became the West Sydney Westars for the seasons, 1986–1987. Merged with the Sydney Supersonics to form the Sydney Kings in 1988.
Canberra Cannons	1979–2003	Celebrated their 20th Anniversary in 1998 as one of only four foundation clubs left in the league. The club only lasted a few more years.
City of Sydney Astronauts / Sydney Supersonics	1979–1987	Became the Sydney Supersonics in 1982. Merged with the West Sydney Westars to form the Sydney Kings in 1988.
Coburg Giants / North Melbourne Giants	1980–1998	Became the North Melbourne Giants for the seasons, 1987–1998. Merged with the South East Melbourne Magic to form the Victoria Titans for the seasons, 1998–2002.
Devonport Warriors	1983–1984	Short-lived team from Devonport, Tasmania. The Warriors were forced to exit the NBL after the league announced it would be culled to 14 teams by 1985. The club never experienced financial hardship, and although the Warriors only won four games in 1984, ten of its losses had been by ten points or less.
Frankston Bears	1983–1984	
Geelong Cats / Geelong Supercats	1982–1996	Became the Geelong Supercats for the seasons, 1988–1996.
Glenelg Tigers	1979	Finished last in the inaugural season and never competed in the NBL again.
Gold Coast Blaze	2007–2012	
Gold Coast Cougars / Gold Coast Rollers	1990–1996	Became the Gold Coast Rollers in 1991.
Hobart Devils / Hobart Tassie Devils	1983–1996	Became the Hobart Tassie Devils for the seasons, 1988–1995. But changed back to the "Hobart Devils" for the 1996 season.
Hunter Pirates	2004–2006	Acquired the licence from the Canberra Cannons and competed for several seasons before folding.
Launceston Casino City	1980–1982	Joined the NBL in 1980. Won a championship in 1981. Finished 5-21 in 1982 and left the NBL.
Newcastle Falcons	1979–1999	One of the foundation clubs in the NBL that celebrated their 20th Anniversary in 1998. Unfortunately the club only lasted one more year in the league afterwards.
Nunawading Spectres / Eastside Spectres	1979–1991	Became the Eastside Spectres in 1987. Merged with the Southern Melbourne Saints to form the South East Melbourne Magic in 1992.
Singapore Slingers	2006–2008	Acquired the licence from the Hunter Pirates, becoming the first Asian team to enter the NBL. They chose to withdraw form the competition due to international flight costs to Australia and New Zealand.
South Dragons	2006–2009	Took up the vacant licence after the demise of Victoria Giants. South Dragons were champions in 2008/2009 but elected to not enter a team in season 2009/10, citing dissatisfaction with the management of the league. It was not allowed to compete in the league afterwards.
South East Melbourne Magic	1992–1998	Formed from a merger between the Eastside Spectres and the Southern Melbourne Saints. Merged with North Melbourne Giants to form the Victoria Titans for the seasons, 1998–2002.
St. Kilda Saints / Westside Saints / Southern Melbourne Saints	1979–1991	Became the Westside Saints in 1987. Became the Southern Melbourne Saints in 1991. Merged with the Eastside Spectres to form the South East Melbourne Magic in 1992.
Townsville Suns / Townsville Crocodiles	1993–2016	
Victoria Titans / Victoria Giants	1998–2004	Formed from a merger between the South East Melbourne Magic and the North Melbourne Giants. Became the Victoria Giants for the seasons, 2002–2004 after the Titans went into financial administration.
West Adelaide Bearcats	1979–1984	Left the NBL following the 1984 season and merged with the Adelaide 36ers.
West Sydney Razorbacks / Sydney Spirit	1998–2008	Became the Sydney Spirit in 2007/08.
West Torrens Eagles / Forestville Eagles	1980–1981	Became the Forestville Eagles in 1981. Left the NBL in 1982 and formed the basis of the Adelaide City Eagles.

== Defunct teams by relations ==
1979–1984		1982	1983–present
West Adelaide Bearcats		Adelaide City Eagles	Adelaide 36ers
1980	1981	Adelaide City Eagles	Adelaide 36ers
West Torrens Eagles	Forestville Eagles	Adelaide City Eagles	Adelaide 36ers

1979–1985	1986–1987	1988–2007/08, 2010/11–present
Bankstown Bruins	West Sydney Westars	Sydney Kings
1979–1981	1982–1987	Sydney Kings
City of Sydney Astronauts	Sydney SuperSonics	Sydney Kings

1980–1986	1987–1998			1998/99–2001/02	2002/03–2003/04	2006/07–2008/09
Coburg Giants	North Melbourne Giants			Victoria Titans	Victoria Giants	South Dragons
1979–1986	1987–1990	1991	1992–1998	Victoria Titans	Victoria Giants	South Dragons
St. Kilda Saints	Westside Saints	Southern Melbourne Saints	South East Melbourne Magic	Victoria Titans	Victoria Giants	South Dragons
1979–1986	1987–1991		South East Melbourne Magic	Victoria Titans	Victoria Giants	South Dragons
Nunawading Spectres	Eastside Spectres		South East Melbourne Magic	Victoria Titans	Victoria Giants	South Dragons

1979–2002/03	2003/04–2005/06	2006/07–present
Canberra Cannons	Hunter Pirates	Singapore Slingers

1998/99–2007/08	2008/09
West Sydney Razorbacks	Sydney Spirit
