= National Basketball League (Australia) =

Men's professional basketball in Australasia

- Current season, competition or edition: 2026–27 NBL season
- Sport: Basketball
- Founded: 1978; 48 years ago (as National Invitation Basketball League)
- Founder: John Raschke
- First season: 1979
- CEO: David Stevenson
- COO: Vince Crivelli
- Director: Larry Kestelman
- Motto: Play It Loud
- No. of teams: 10
- Countries: Australia (9 teams); New Zealand (1 team)
- Headquarters: 88 Green Street; Cremorne, Melbourne, Victoria, 3121
- Confederation: FIBA Oceania (Oceania)
- Most recent champions: Sydney Kings (6th title) (2025–26)
- Most titles: Perth Wildcats (10 titles)
- Broadcasters: ESPN/Foxtel, Nine Network/9Go!, Sky Sport
- Streaming partners: Disney+, Kayo Sports, 9Now, NBL TV, Sky Sport Now
- Sponsor: Hungry Jack's
- Level on pyramid: 1
- Domestic cup: NBL Ignite Cup
- International cup: Intercontinental Cup
- Website: www.nbl.com.au

The National Basketball League (NBL) is a men's professional basketball league in Australasia, currently composed of ten teams: nine in Australia and one in New Zealand. It is the premier professional men's basketball league in Australia and New Zealand. The league was played in the Australian winter until 1998 when it switched to summer seasons beginning with the 1998–99 season. The NBL's regular season runs from September to February, with each team playing 33 games. The league's finals extends into March to April, culminating with the Championship grand final series.

== History ==
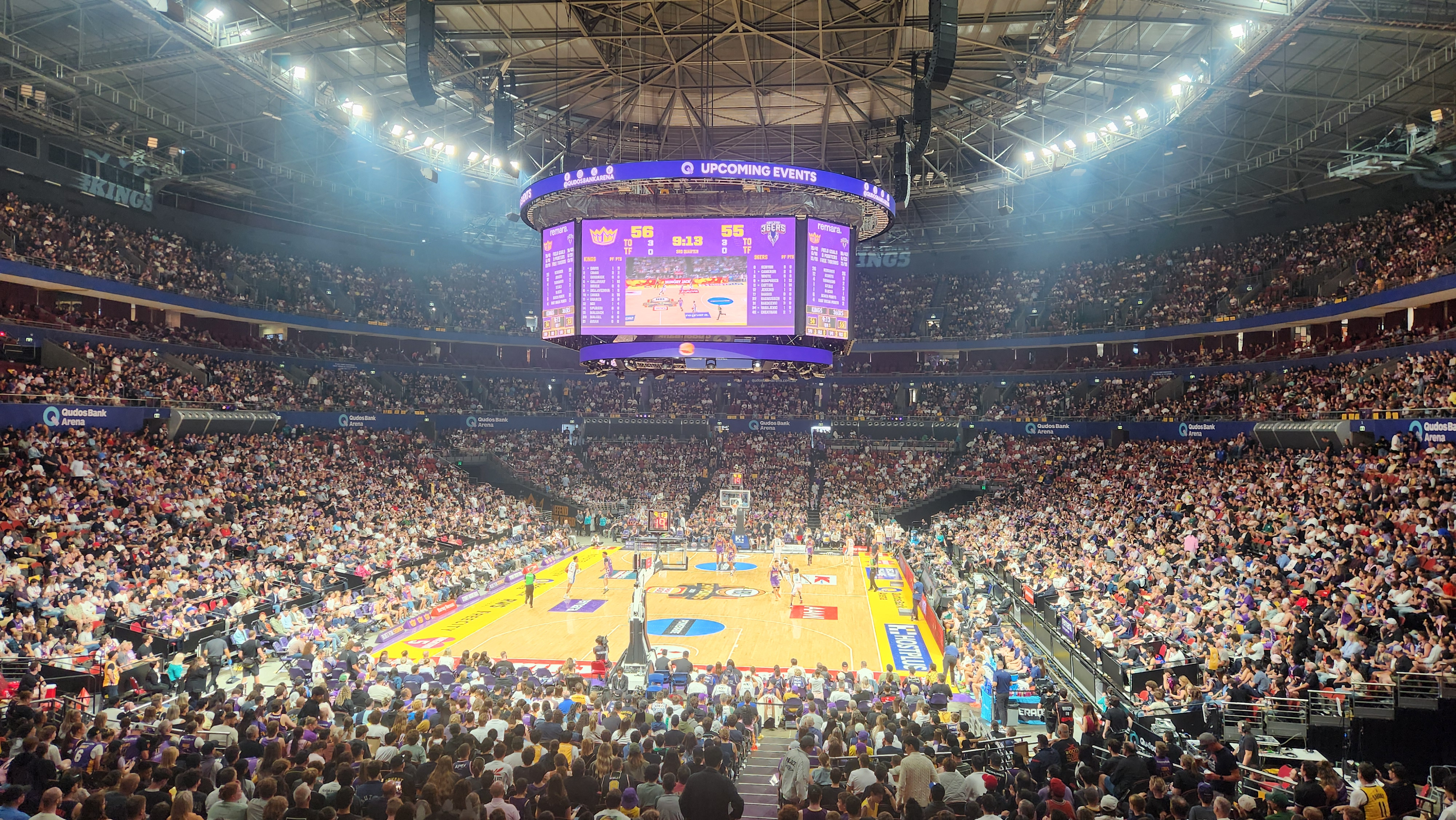
The league's attendance record of 18,589 was set on 5th April 2026 at the Sydney SuperDome when the Sydney Kings played the Adelaide 36ers in the deciding Game 5 of the 2026 Championship series. Sydney would win in overtime to take their 6th championship.

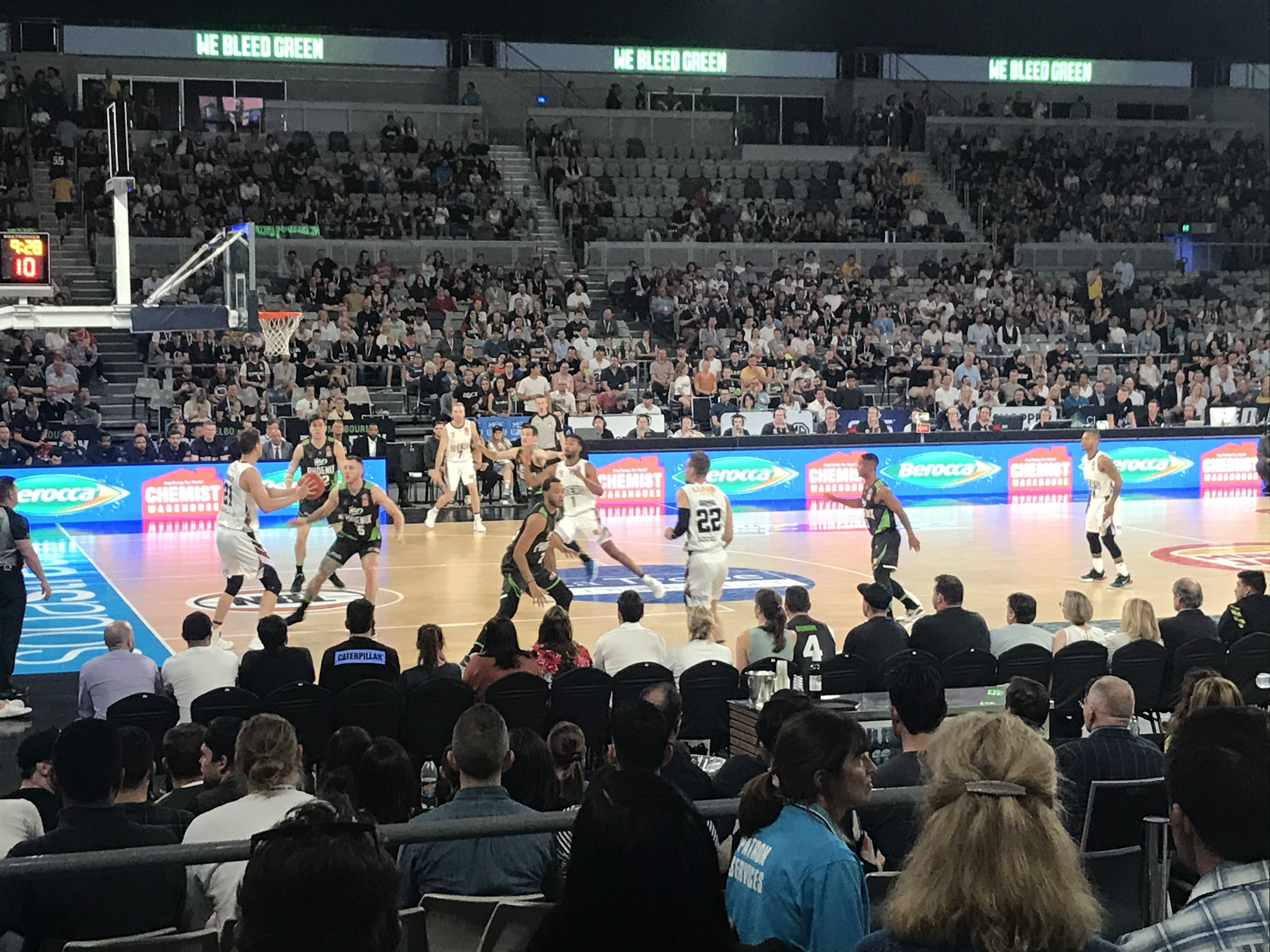
S.E. Melbourne Phoenix and Adelaide 36ers at John Cain Arena in 2019

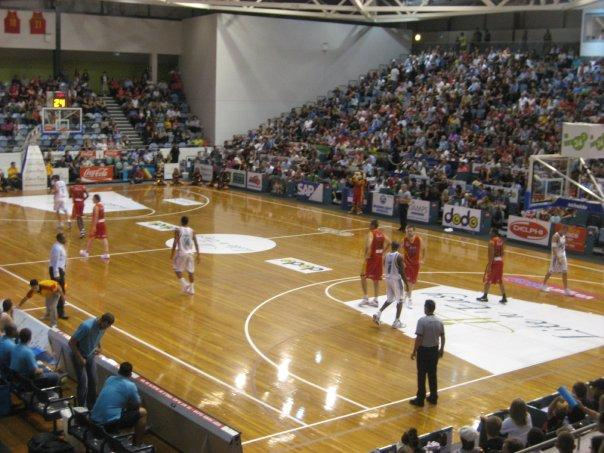
Melbourne Tigers and Gold Coast Blaze at Parkville Stadium in 2010

The NBL was established as the National Invitation Basketball League (NIBL) in 1978 and commenced its first season in 1979. It was renamed as the National Basketball League (NBL) in 1980.

Before the establishment of the NBL, there were two national basketball competitions: the National Titles and the Australian Club Championships.

In August 1979, the inaugural season of the NBL commenced, playing in the winter season (April–September) which it did so until the completion of the 1998 season, the league's twentieth season. The 1998–99 season, which began only months later, was the first to be played during the summer season (October–April). The shift, which is currently used by the league, was an attempt to avoid competing directly against Australia's various winter season football codes. Officially the NBL is Australia's third oldest continuing national sporting competition after the domestic cricket competition (which commenced its first season in 1892) and Australian Football League (which commenced its first season in 1897 as the Victorian Football League before changing its name in 1990).

The NBL experienced its "golden age" in the late 1980s and early 1990s, but its popularity, media attention, attendance and corporate support deteriorated and plateaued in the decade afterward with the growth of the country's four football codes.

A second Melbourne club, the South Dragons, entered the league in the 2006–07 season, but was short lived, soon folding 3 years later after the 2008–09 season in which they were NBL champions. In the 2006–07 season, the NBL became the first Australasian sporting league to field a team from Asia with the Singapore Slingers playing. The Gold Coast Blaze also joined the competition in the 2007–08 season. In 2007, Australian NBA player Andrew Bogut suggested the NBL try to adopt a model similar to the Australian Football League (AFL) whereby there are the same 10 or 15 teams over a 10-year period.

A turbulent period during 2008 and 2009 saw the league lose teams from Sydney, Melbourne, Brisbane and Singapore.

The 2009–10 season earmarked as the season in which the NBL would begin its revamping, much like the old National Soccer League which became the eight team A-League. The NBL returned to free-to-air television in Australia for the first time in three years with One broadcasting 2–3 games a week.

The 2010–11 season saw the return of the Sydney Kings after the club was purchased for A$20,000 on 31 July 2008.

In 2013, the NBL had a de-merger from Basketball Australia.

Crowds improved for the 2013–14 NBL season, recording the highest cumulative crowd attendance figures for the past five years.

After numerous teams folding and a plummeting public profile property developer Larry Kestelman purchased a 51% portion of the league. Since then game attendance, TV viewership, website visitors and app downloads have been consistently on the increase.

In April 2016, the Townsville Crocodiles folded as they had become too financially unsustainable to continue. Larry Kestelman would later state on the Aussie Hoopla podcast that no NBL club will ever fold again as long as he is in control of the league.

Allowing for clubs to recruit the best Australian players not in the NBA became easier with the marquee rule which saw the return from Europe and the US of players such as Brad Newley, David Andersen and Andrew Bogut. In addition the Special Restricted Player rule, introduced for the 2016–17 season, allows for clubs to recruit players born in countries such as China, the Philippines, Taiwan, India, South Korea, Singapore, and Japan who would not count as imports under NBL rules.

From 2016 to 2018, there was a renewed interest in the sport, with it being described at the time as being the National Basketball League's greatest ever period. 2016–17 set a new attendance record for the league, with the figure being matched the following year, as well as the Grand Final series for the 2017–18 season.

In 2018, the S.E. Melbourne Phoenix were announced as the latest club to join the league, and started competing in the 2019–20 season; a season which was widely regarded as a major season for the league. After an active off-season, including the signings of LaMelo Ball and R. J. Hampton, two highly rated NBA 2020 draft picks, the league started by continuing to topple attendance records from the first round. The season's opening night had 10,300 fans in attendance to watch Melbourne United and the S.E. Melbourne Phoenix compete in the first "Throwdown", with a further 20,550 fans attending games across the first round. After signing a broadcasting deal with Facebook Watch, over one million American fans watched Ball's first game in the NBL against the Brisbane Bullets.

Following two condensed seasons due to the COVID-19 pandemic, the 2022–23 NBL season and the 2023 finals series saw a number of all-time attendance records being set for the league. As well, on 16 November 2022, Isaac Humphries came out as gay, which meant Humphries was the first Australian male basketball player and the first player in the NBL to be openly gay, and the only active openly gay male professional basketball player in a top-tier league anywhere in the world at the time.

In the 2023–24 season, one million fans attended NBL games for the first time since 1996.

On 11 March 2025, the National Basketball Association, the National Basketball League and the Victoria State Government announced that the New Orleans Pelicans of the NBA would play two pre-season exhibition basketball games at Rod Laver Arena in Melbourne, Victoria, Australia, as part of the NBA x NBL: Melbourne Series. The Pelicans played Melbourne United on 3 October 2025, and the South East Melbourne Phoenix on 5 October 2025.

On 20 August 2025, the NBL and ESPN announced they had extended their broadcast and streaming media deal. 2025-26 games will be live on Disney+ via the ESPN tile as well as the existing coverage through Foxtel, Kayo Sports, Fetch TV, and Sky New Zealand.

== Competition format ==
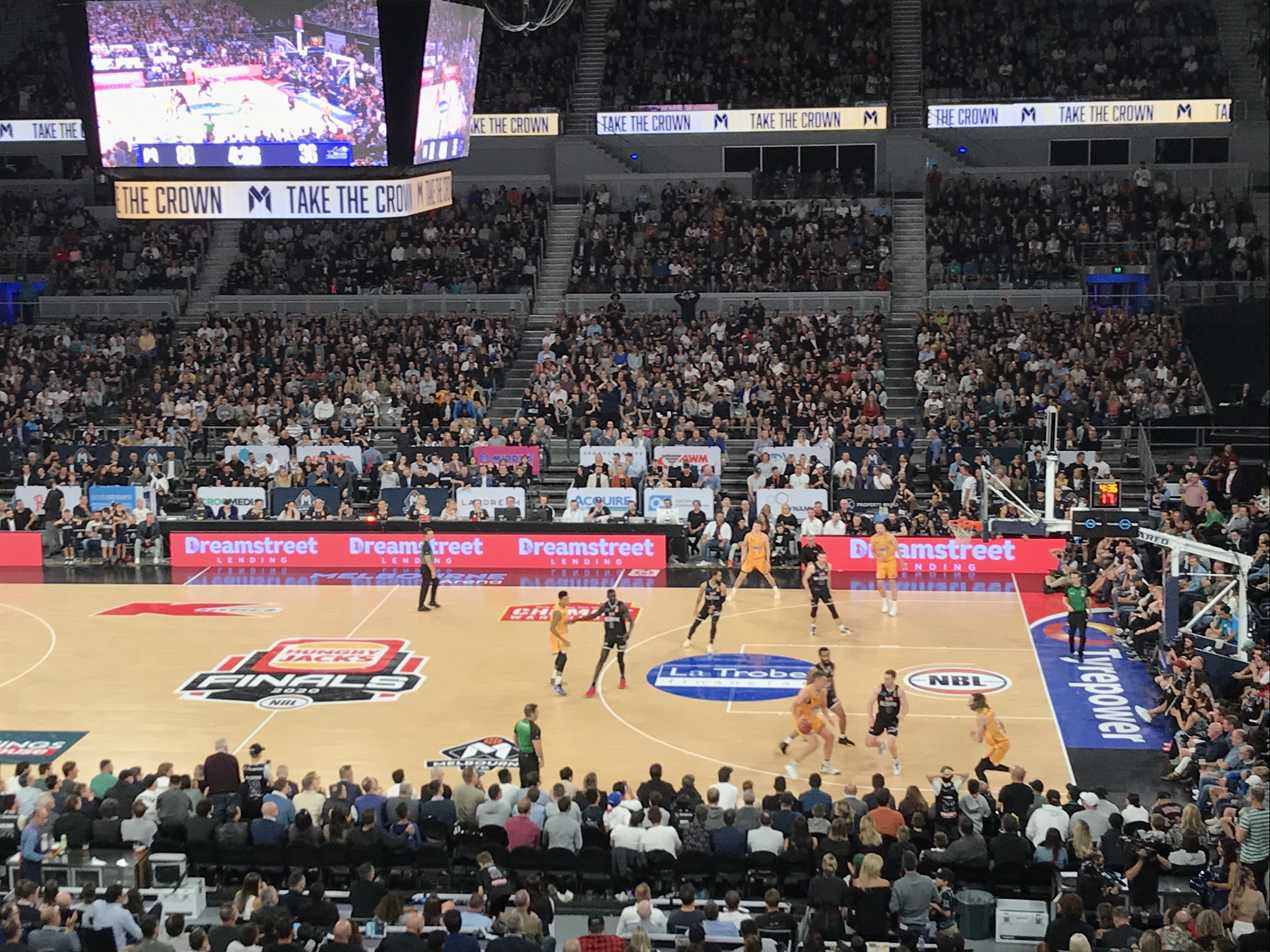
Melbourne United and Sydney Kings at Melbourne Arena

=== Game length ===
From the 1979 season until the 1983 season, the NBL played 40 minute games with two 20-minute halves and no three-point line. From the 1984 season until the 2008–09 season, the NBL played 48 minute games over four 12-minute quarters. Since the 2009–10 season, the NBL's format is 40 minute games with four 10-minute quarters, known as the "modern" 40-minute era.

=== Regular season ===
Since the 2009–10 season, each team has played 28 games during the regular season, 14 home and 14 away. The regular season starts in early October and ends in mid February.

In the 2020–21 season, each team played an extra 8 games (36 games) due to the newly formatted NBL Cup tournament. The following season the NBL returned to their normal format of 28 games with no midseason tournament.

=== Finals ===
The top four teams at the end of the regular season advances to the Finals. The team finishing in the first and second position at the completion of the regular season receives home advantages in their best-of-three first round matchup against the team finishing in third and fourth position. The winner of each of the three matches advances to the Grand Final. The winner of Series 1 plays the winner of Series 2 in the best-of-five Grand Final series, with home advantage being awarded to the highest remaining seed. The winner of this series is crowned as NBL champion.

In the 2022–23 season, the NBL introduced play-in games. The top two seeds in the regular season will automatically qualify to the semi-finals. Teams ranked three to six will compete in the play-in tournament. The third seed will play the fourth seed for third spot and the loser will play the winner of fifth or sixth for the fourth seed.

=== NBL Ignite Cup ===
On 18 June 2025, the NBL established the first NBL Ignite Cup. It will begin each season in Round 4 starting with the 2025–26 NBL season, with games played every Wednesday evening. Teams will receive one point for every quarter they win or half a point each if tied, and three points for winning the game. Each team will play two home games and two road games. The two highest-ranked teams based on both points will advance to the Grand Final. The winner of the Grand Final will receive prize money. The 20 games will count toward a team's record, while the Grand Final would not count as a regular season game. It is similar to the 2021 NBL Cup. Teams will be awarded one point for each quarter they win and three points for each game they win.

=== NBL Cup (defunct) ===
In the 2020–21 season, the NBL introduced the NBL Cup which is a 36-game mid-season competition. Each game would contribute to each team's regular season record. In the 2021–22 season, the NBL returned to their normal format of 28 games. In May 2023, the league raised the potential for a return of a cup tournament with a Magic Round-style basketball event. A mid-season tournament was raised again by the league in January 2025 following the success of the NBA Cup.

== Current clubs ==
The NBL began play in 1979 with ten clubs. Due to club expansions, reductions, and relocations, many of the clubs either changed or ceased to exist. There are currently ten clubs; nine clubs in Australia and one club in New Zealand. The clubs are located in Adelaide, Auckland, Brisbane, Cairns, Hobart, Melbourne, Perth, Sydney, and Wollongong. The Brisbane Bullets and the Illawarra Hawks are the oldest clubs in the league, with both clubs being established in 1979. The Hawks are the only club which has participated in every NBL season since the inaugural season in 1979.

Overview of current NBL clubs
Club	City	State/Region	Country	Arena	Capacity	Head coach	Title(s)	Founded
Adelaide 36ers	Adelaide	South Australia	Australia	Adelaide Entertainment Centre	10,000	(Australia) Trevor Gleeson	4	1982
Brisbane Bullets	Brisbane	Queensland	Australia	Brisbane Entertainment Centre	10,500	(United States) Will Weaver	3	1979
Cairns Taipans	Cairns	Queensland	Australia	Cairns Convention Centre	5,300	(Australia) Adam Forde	0	1999
Illawarra Hawks	Wollongong	New South Wales	Australia	Wollongong Entertainment Centre	6,000	(United States) Justin Tatum	2	1979
Melbourne United	Melbourne	Victoria	Australia	John Cain Arena	10,300	(Australia) Jacob Chance	6	1984
New Zealand Breakers	Auckland	(New Zealand) Auckland Region	New Zealand	Auckland City Arena	9,740	(Canada) Gordon Herbert	4	2003
Perth Wildcats	Perth	Western Australia	Australia	Perth Arena	15,500	(Australia) John Rillie	10	1982
South East Melbourne Phoenix	Melbourne	Victoria	Australia	John Cain Arena	10,300	(United States) Josh King	0	2018
Sydney Kings	Sydney	New South Wales	Australia	Sydney SuperDome	18,000	(Australia) Brian Goorjian	6	1988
Tasmania JackJumpers	Hobart	Tasmania	Australia	Derwent Entertainment Centre	4,340	(United States) Scott Roth	1	2020

* Arenas shown with their non-commercial name where possible.

=== Former clubs ===
Overview of defunct NBL clubs
Club	City/Town	Region/State/Territory	Country	NBL season(s)
Canberra Cannons	Canberra	Australian Capital Territory	Australia	1979–2003
Devonport Warriors	Devonport	Tasmania	Australia	1983–1984
Eastside Spectres	Nunawading	Victoria	Australia	1979–1991
Forestville Eagles	Wayville	South Australia	Australia	1980–1981
Frankston Bears	Frankston	Victoria	Australia	1983–1984
Geelong Supercats	Geelong	Victoria	Australia	1982–1996
Glenelg Tigers	Glenelg	South Australia	Australia	1979
Gold Coast Blaze	Gold Coast	Queensland	Australia	2007–2012
Gold Coast Rollers	Gold Coast	Queensland	Australia	1990–1996
Hobart Devils	Hobart	Tasmania	Australia	1983–1996
Hunter Pirates	Newcastle	New South Wales	Australia	2003–2006
Launceston Casino City	Launceston	Tasmania	Australia	1980–1982
Newcastle Falcons	Newcastle	New South Wales	Australia	1979–1999
North Melbourne Giants	North Melbourne	Victoria	Australia	1980–1998
Singapore Slingers	Kallang	Central Region	Singapore	2006–2008
South Dragons	Melbourne	Victoria	Australia	2006–2009
South East Melbourne Magic	Melbourne	Victoria	Australia	1992–1998
Southern Melbourne Saints	Melbourne	Victoria	Australia	1979–1991
Sydney SuperSonics	Sydney	New South Wales	Australia	1979–1987
Townsville Crocodiles	Townsville	Queensland	Australia	1993–2016
Victoria Titans	Melbourne	Victoria	Australia	1998–2004
West Adelaide Bearcats	Adelaide	South Australia	Australia	1979–1984
West Sydney Razorbacks	Western Sydney	New South Wales	Australia	1998–2009
West Sydney Westars	Bankstown	New South Wales	Australia	1979–1987

=== Recent expansion ===
After weeks of reports of a return of a Tasmanian team, in June 2019, Larry Kestelman flagged Tasmania as a potential 10th team. However he stressed that if a Tasmanian team did enter the NBL, they would be eased in, and that there was no timeline. On 28 February 2020, the NBL and the Tasmanian Government announced that they had reached an agreement for Tasmania to host the 10th team in the NBL, known as the Tasmania JackJumpers, which would join for the 2021–22 season.

In April 2022, Larry Kestelman flagged Canberra as a potential 11th team. Kestelman says "Canberra could be next in line for a league license, following the same model as the Tasmania JackJumpers." The last Canberra team to play in the NBL was the Cannons from 1979 to 2003. They won three NBL championships and played their home games at the AIS Arena.

In January 2024, the NBL announced a partnership with the Japanese B.League which will see future collaboration on pre-season game crossovers and potential exploration of the viability of a team from Japan participating in the NBL.

== Rivalries ==
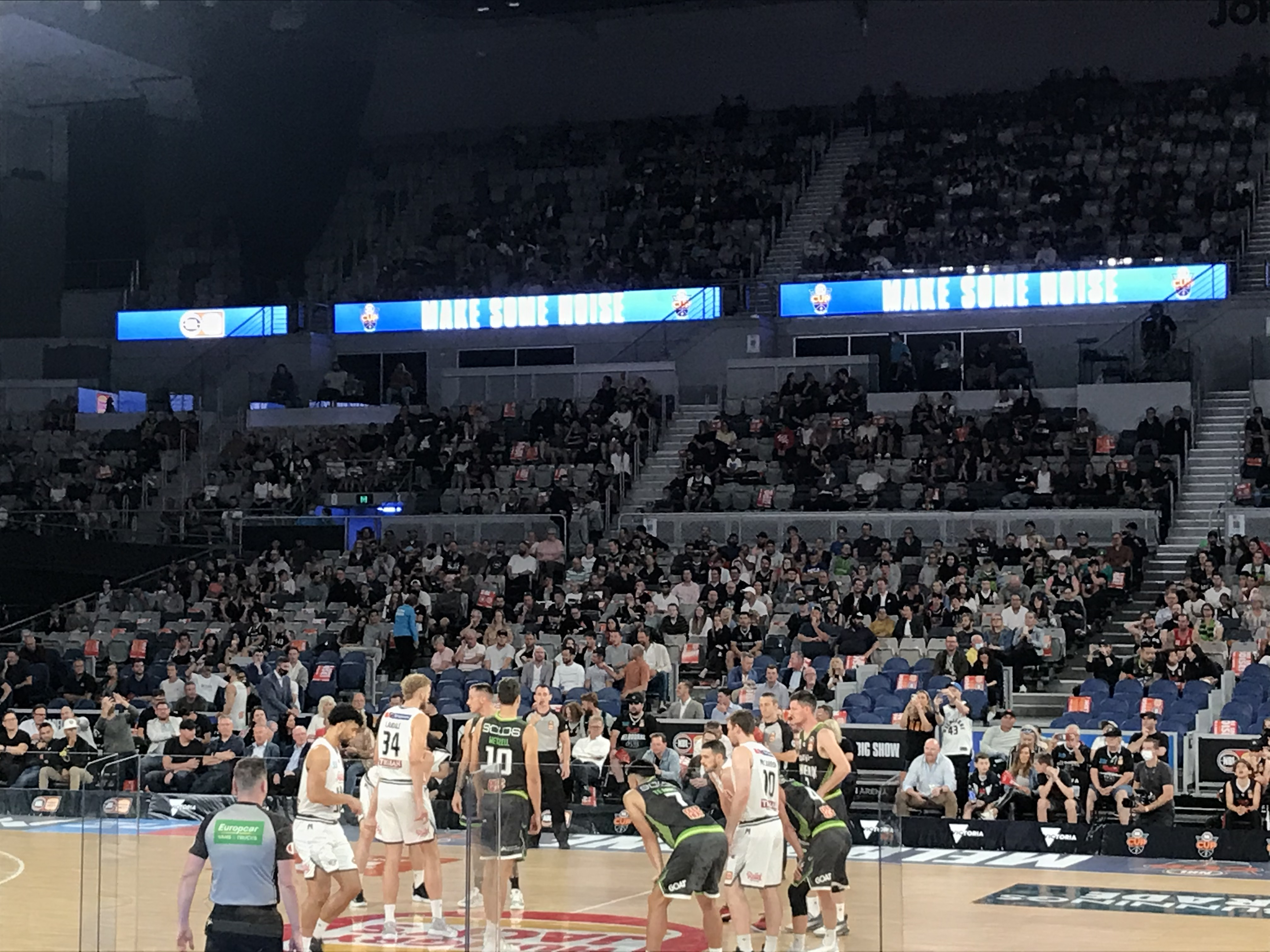
S.E. Melbourne Phoenix and Melbourne United at John Cain Arena

Adelaide 36ers vs Brisbane Bullets

Arguably the NBL's oldest rivalry started in 1985 when the Brian Kerle coached Bullets defeated the Ken Cole coached 36ers 121–95 in the 1985 NBL Grand Final, the last single game Grand Final in NBL history. From 1985 to 1987, the Bullets and 36ers were the two dominant teams in the NBL and the two clubs met in the 1986 NBL Grand Final, the first NBL GF to be played over a 3-game series. An Australian indoor sports attendance record of around 11,000 saw the first game of the 1986 series played at the Brisbane Entertainment Centre with Adelaide, who had a 24–2 record for the season, winning 122–119 in overtime. Brisbane then handed Adelaide its only home loss of 1986 (the 36ers had gone 13–0 at the Apollo Stadium) when they won Game 2 104–83 before Adelaide won its first NBL title with a 113–91 win at Apollo in Game 3. The teams were evenly matched at the time with players such as Al Green, Mark Davis, Bill Jones, Peter Ali, Darryl Pearce, Mike McKay and Dwayne Nelson (Adelaide) against Brisbane's star import Leroy Loggins, captain Larry Sengstock, guard Ron Radliff, forwards Danny Morseu, Robert Sibley and Chris McGraw, centre John Dorge and (in 1985 and 1986) Cal Bruton. Loggins was the NBL MVP in 1986 and 1987 (and player of the match in the 1985 GF) while Mark Davis was the Grand Final MVP in 1986 and shared the NBL MVP award with Loggins in 1987.

The Rivalry between the two clubs again reached fever pitch in the mid-1990s when Bullets guard Shane Heal earned the ire of the Adelaide crowd during Game 3 of the 1994 Elimination final series when he gave the crowd at the Clipsal Powerhouse a 'double bird'. Heal, who had scored 61 points in the last regular season game before scoring 42 points in Game 1 to lead Brisbane to a 116–105 home win over the 36ers, had not actually managed to score a point before half time in Game 2 which the 36ers had won 99–91 before also winning Game 3 101–84. Heal, along with former 36er Mark Bradtke who had left under acrimonious circumstances at the end of 1992 to join the Melbourne Tigers, became public enemy #1 to the 36ers crowd following the incident.

With the Bullets returning to the NBL in 2016, the rivalry has continued with Adelaide defeating the Bullets in their first encounter at home, the Bullets returning the favour with an away win in Adelaide, while a week later Adelaide spoiled the Bullets regular season return to the Entertainment Centre for the first time since 1997 with a resounding 101–83 win.

Adelaide 36ers vs Melbourne United

Apart from the normal South Australian and Victorian rivalry, the 36ers vs United (formerly Tigers) rivalry started at the end of the 1992 season when 36ers centre Mark Bradtke joined Spanish club Juver Murcia following the 1992 Olympics in Barcelona, Spain for a short stint. Before he left he signed an agreement with the 36ers stating that he would finish his one-year contract with the club should he return within a certain time. Upon his return to Australia, Bradtke stated his intention not to return to the 36ers with the Tigers rumoured to be actively chasing him. After protracted negotiations with 36ers management that led to the club being prepared to buy out his remaining contract, the NBL stepped in and vetoed the buy out, effectively letting Bradtke leave for Melbourne without the 36ers receiving any compensation for the remainder of his contract with the club. When Bradtke returned to Adelaide with the Tigers on 4 July 1993 he was soundly booed whenever he touched the ball by the 8,000 strong crowd at the Clipsal Powerhouse. The booing of Bradtke and the Andrew Gaze led Tigers continued for a number of seasons.

A new rivalry has emerged with Julius Hodge, a former 36er, returning to the NBL in November 2009, signing with the Melbourne Tigers. Hodge was a star in Adelaide when he joined the 36ers mid-season the previous two years, however issues relating to alleged missed payments caused him to walk out on the club in early January 2009 on bad terms.

Hodge returned to his old home court for the first time on 5 December 2009 in a Tigers overtime victory. After being heckled and taunted all night in a quiet game by his standards, Hodge caused more controversy when he stamped and spat on the Brett Maher signature on the centre of the Brett Maher Court following his new club's win. He was booed off aggressively and loudly by the Adelaide fans and needed security to escort him out of the stadium.

Adelaide 36ers vs Perth Wildcats

Both teams were perennial championship contenders in the late 1980s and early 90s and had several marquee players with excellent match-ups, the three most notable all involving American imports: Al Green (Adelaide) vs Cal Bruton (Perth), Mark Davis (Adelaide) vs James Crawford (Perth) and Bill Jones (Adelaide) vs Tiny Pinder (Perth). Games during this era were rarely blowouts and helped to fuel the rivalry. Adelaide won the 1986 NBL Championship over the Brisbane Bullets and Bruton, who moved from Brisbane to be player-coach of Perth in 1987, built a team specifically to beat the reigning champions. Despite the long time rivalry between the two clubs, and the two teams having played numerous semi-final series against each other with the first being in that 1987 season, they did not face each other in a grand final series until the 2013–14 season, which was won by the Perth Wildcats. the Wildcats have won each semi-finals series played between the two (1987, 1989 and 1995).

The 1995 series proved to be one of the most volatile and controversial due to an incident between 36ers forward Chris Blakemore and Perth's Martin Cattalini in Game 1 in Adelaide. Under instructions from coach Mike Dunlap to basically belt the next Perth player to go through the key, Blakemore back handed Cattalini, giving the Wildcats forward a large cut on his mouth that required 15 stitches. Blakemore was suspended for Game 2 in Perth as the Wildcats swept the 36ers 2–0 before going on to defeat the defending champion North Melbourne Giants (who had swept Adelaide in 1994) 2–1 in the Grand Final. In an ironic twist, Cattalini would join the 36ers in 1996 and later went on to win two championships with the club (plus another with Perth), while Blakemore, the NBL's Rookie of the year in 1993 and its Most Improved Player award winner in 1994, as well as playing for the Australian Boomers in 1995, joined the Canberra Cannons in 1996 and his career went downhill from there with his NBL career ending at the end of 1997 after just two seasons with the Cannons.

As the mainstay players began to slow with age and retire, the intensity of this rivalry has declined. The two clubs remain some of the most successful in the NBL with four championships for Adelaide and ten for Perth, and are first and second on the all-time wins list (748 wins for Perth, 692 wins for Adelaide as of 20 May 2021) and have also matched up on more occasions (134 times total; Perth leading all time between the two 73 – 61) than any other two teams in the NBL (as of 15 November 2019). The rivalry continues into the 2012–13 season with the 36ers beating the Wildcats in back to back games in rounds 6 and 7, including the opening game at Perth's new home, the Perth Arena, in front of a then record Wildcats crowd of 11,562.

The Wildcats and the 36ers dominated the 2013–14 NBL season, finishing first and second respectively during the regular round. After the three previous semi-final meetings, they then faced off in their first ever Grand Final series which saw the Wildcats emerge with their record 6th NBL championship with a 2–1 series win. This was one of the most anticipated series in NBL history, not only given the two clubs' long-standing rivalry, but also due to the post-game on court 'brawl' which took place following their Round 18 clash in Perth earlier in the season.

Adelaide and Perth play for the Cattalini Cup named for Perth born Martin Cattalini who won two championships with each club. In each game, the game MVP is awarded with the Paul Rogers Medal named for Adelaide born centre Paul Rogers who made his NBL debut for the 36ers in 1992 and later joined Perth, winning 2 championships and the NBL MVP award in 2000 while with the Wildcats.

Adelaide 36ers vs Sydney Kings

After Kendric Davis signed a contract with the Kings during the 2025 offseason after being with Adelaide for a season, Adelaide made a marquee signing of 5-time MVP Bryce Cotton. The season prior they battled for the NBL MVP, which Cotton won. Coming into the NBL season Davis was saying “he was treated wrong by Adelaide” and also stating that “he hates Adelaide because they only treated him right because of the mark he made”. During NBL26, Kendric Davis and Bryce Cotton went game for game trying to get the NBL MVP which again, ended up in Bryce’s hands. After the award was announced Davis went onto Instagram Live and said “I should’ve won it” also requesting a voting change. Eventually these two teams would meet in the NBL26 Championship series where Sydney took game one by a record-breaking 44 point win over Adelaide. Game 2 was then neck and neck through the whole thing. In the dying seconds Davis went to take a contested layup and missed. Nick Rakocevic tipped to ball into Bryce Cottons hands and he lays it up over Torrey Craig to win the game 91-89 at the Adelaide Entertainment Centre. After Cotton won the game, Davis started going into his face and trash talking him after the defeat. This sparked a never ending rivalry between the two. Game 3 Davis single-handedly won Sydney the game in Sydney. Again he trash talked Cotton after the game as it was seen on live TV. Game 4 Was again neck and neck in Adelaide but Torrey Craig missed the free throw to win the game as Adelaide won by 1. Game 5 in Sydney, with 18,000 fans watching was neck and neck. After a Zylan Cheatham missed floater, Davis got it and missed a 3 pointer, however Tim Soares grabbed the rebound for the putback for the tie. Sydney then dominated in overtime winning 113-101 to secure the Championship at home. Davis won Finals MVP

Just before a regular season rematch, Davis stated “there is no love for me and Bryce” stating the rivalry is truly alive.

Cairns Taipans vs Townsville Crocodiles

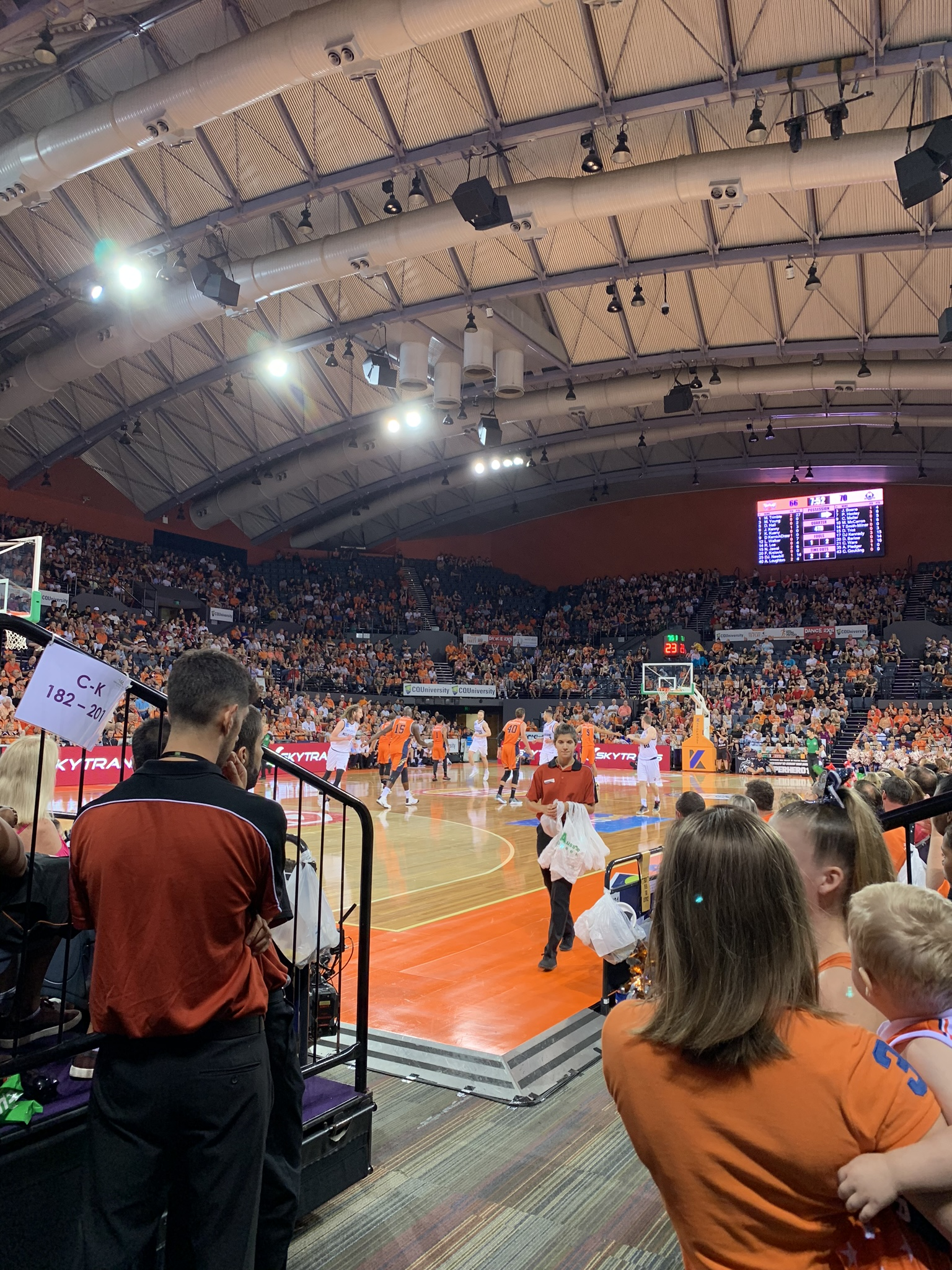
Cairns Taipans and Melbourne United at Cairns Convention Centre

A local rivalry between the Cairns Taipans and Townsville Crocodiles, nicknamed the "Reptile Rumble", has developed in the NBL. The rivalry has existed for over ten years. Home games for both teams have attracted crowds of over 4,000. The rivalry was threatened when the Taipans faced financial difficulties.

The rivalry between the two North Queensland based clubs is currently extinct due to the Crocodiles folding at the end of the 2015–16 NBL season.

Illawarra Hawks vs Sydney Kings

Illawarra Hawks fans consider the Sydney Kings to be their most fierce rival. Many Hawks players have moved to the Kings including two former Rookie of the Year winners and a two-time Olympian. In the absence of the Kings, the Sydney Spirit took the role of rival, but this felt fake to some Hawks faithful. The Hawks took bragging rights after the 2000–01 season when they became the first team from New South Wales to qualify for the NBL finals, which they won against Townsville. Sydney then took the ascendency when they won three championships in a row, including a clean sweep of the Hawks.

The next time they met in the post-season, Sydney swept the Hawks 2–0 in the 2022 Semi-Finals en route to their fourth championship.

New Zealand Breakers vs Perth Wildcats

The Breakers and the Wildcats have arguably been the NBL's strongest teams and have been fairly evenly matched. Between them, they have won every year's premiership from 2009–10 to 2016–17 and met in the final in 2011–12 and 2012–13 (both won by the Breakers) and 2015–16 (won by the Wildcats). Both teams have similarities in that they have to travel great distances to play any other NBL team. These two factors have combined to make a "derby of distance" between the NBL's farthest-flung members. The rivalry may have its origins in a scrap between players from each side after a game in 2004. Games between the two sides have been intense ones for several years and often marked with incident.

Melbourne United vs South East Melbourne Phoenix

Known as the "Throwdown", these two teams formed a rivalry as they are both based in Melbourne and play their games at John Cain Arena. The first Throwdown was the Phoenix's first game in the NBL, as well as the first game of the 2019–20 NBL season, with the Phoenix winning 91–88.

The two teams have since met in the 2021 semi-finals, with United winning the series 2–1.

== Organisation ==
=== Sponsorship ===
At the start of the 2004–05 season, the NBL struck a new television deal with Fox Sports in Australia and a multi-year naming-rights sponsorship deal with electronics manufacturer Philips. Though in 2007, Philips announced they would not continuing their naming rights sponsorship in response to the NBL wishing to increase the sponsorship deal. On 18 September 2007, the NBL announced Hummer as their naming rights sponsor for the 2007–08 season.

On 13 September 2010, iiNet was announced as the NBL naming rights sponsor and Centrebet as the official sports betting partner. Spalding provided equipment including the official game ball, with AND1 supplying team apparel. The iiNet sponsorship lasted for 3 seasons, and the Centrebet sponsorship lasted for two seasons.

On 5 October 2017, Hungry Jack's became the naming rights sponsor for the NBL. The Hungry Jack's logo features on player jerseys, in and around venues and the company is closely associated with Heritage Month in January.

==== Naming rights ====
- 1979 to 1987: none
- 1988 to 1991: Hungry Jack's
- 1992 to 2001–02: Mitsubishi
- 2002–03 to 2003–04: none
- 2004–05 to 2006–07: Philips
- 2007–08: Hummer
- 2008–09 to 2009–10: none
- 2010–11 to 2012–13: iiNet
- 2013–14 to 2016–17: none
- 2017–18 to present: Hungry Jack's

=== Media coverage ===
==== Australia and NZ ====
National television broadcasting rights are as follows: While the ABC had exclusive national broadcasting rights from 1979 to 1987, other television stations around the country (usually those affiliated with either the Seven Network or Network Ten) would broadcast their local teams to their state markets once the sport gained popularity. For example, in the mid-1980s the Adelaide 36ers and Brisbane Bullets home games were shown in Adelaide and Brisbane by Network Ten stations SAS and TV0 respectively.

In 2015, Fox Sports secured a 5-year deal for the Australian broadcasting rights of all games, starting with the 2015–16 season. In addition, for the 2015–16 season Nine Network secured one weekly match (every Sunday afternoon) for FTA. In 2016, SBS secured the exclusive free-to-air rights for the 2016–17 season, broadcasting and streaming online one Sunday match live each week. In the 2017–18 Season, SBS broadcast 2 games live, one on Saturday and another on Sunday, while ABC broadcast a Friday night game on delay at 11pm. In 2021, the NBL signed a three-year deal with ESPN, Foxtel, Kayo Sports and News Corp, with every game broadcast on ESPN and Kayo Sports, and selected games broadcast with the NBL's free-to-air partner 10 Peach.

Year	Australia		New Zealand	
Year	Free TV	Pay TV	Free TV	Pay TV
1979	ABC			
1987	ABC			
1988	Seven Network			
1991	Seven Network			
1992	Network Ten			
1995	Network Ten	Fox Sports		
1997	Network Ten	Fox Sports		
1998	ABC	Fox Sports		
2001	ABC	Fox Sports		Sky Sport
2007	Nine Network	Fox Sports	Māori Television	Sky Sport
2010	Network Ten/One	Fox Sports	Māori Television	Sky Sport
2011	Network Ten/One			Sky Sport
2015	Network Ten/One			Sky Sport
2016	Nine Network	Fox Sports		Sky Sport
2017	SBS	Fox Sports		Sky Sport
2018	SBS; ABC	Fox Sports		Sky Sport
2019	Nine Network/9Go!	Fox Sports		Sky Sport
2020	SBS/SBS Viceland; NITV	ESPN/Kayo		Sky Sport
2021	10 Peach	ESPN/Kayo		Sky Sport
2022	10 Peach	ESPN/Kayo		Sky Sport
2023	10 Peach	ESPN/Kayo		Sky Sport
2024	Network 10/10 Drama	ESPN/Kayo	TVNZ+	ESPN/Sky Sport
2025	Network 10/10 Drama	ESPN/Kayo/Disney+		ESPN/Sky Sport
2026	Nine Network/9Now	ESPN/Kayo/Disney+		ESPN/Sky Sport

==== outside ANZ ====
Region	Broadcaster
Austria	EuroLeague TV
Belgium	EuroLeague TV
Bulgaria	EuroLeague TV
Cyprus	EuroLeague TV
Denmark	EuroLeague TV
Finland	EuroLeague TV
France	EuroLeague TV
Germany	EuroLeague TV
Greece	EuroLeague TV
Italy	EuroLeague TV
Lithuania	EuroLeague TV
Netherlands	EuroLeague TV
Norway	EuroLeague TV
Poland	EuroLeague TV
Portugal	EuroLeague TV
Romania	EuroLeague TV
Sweden	EuroLeague TV
Switzerland	EuroLeague TV
Turkey	EuroLeague TV
United Arab Emirates	EuroLeague TV
United Kingdom	EuroLeague TV
United States
United States	NBA TV
Canada	NBA TV
Bosnia and Herzegovina	Sport Klub
Montenegro	Sport Klub
North Macedonia	Sport Klub
Serbia	Sport Klub
China	Leisu
China	Penguin Sports
Croatia	Arena Sport
Slovenia	Arena Sport
Israel	Sport5
Russia	Start
Ukraine	Maincast

=== Squad formation and salary cap ===
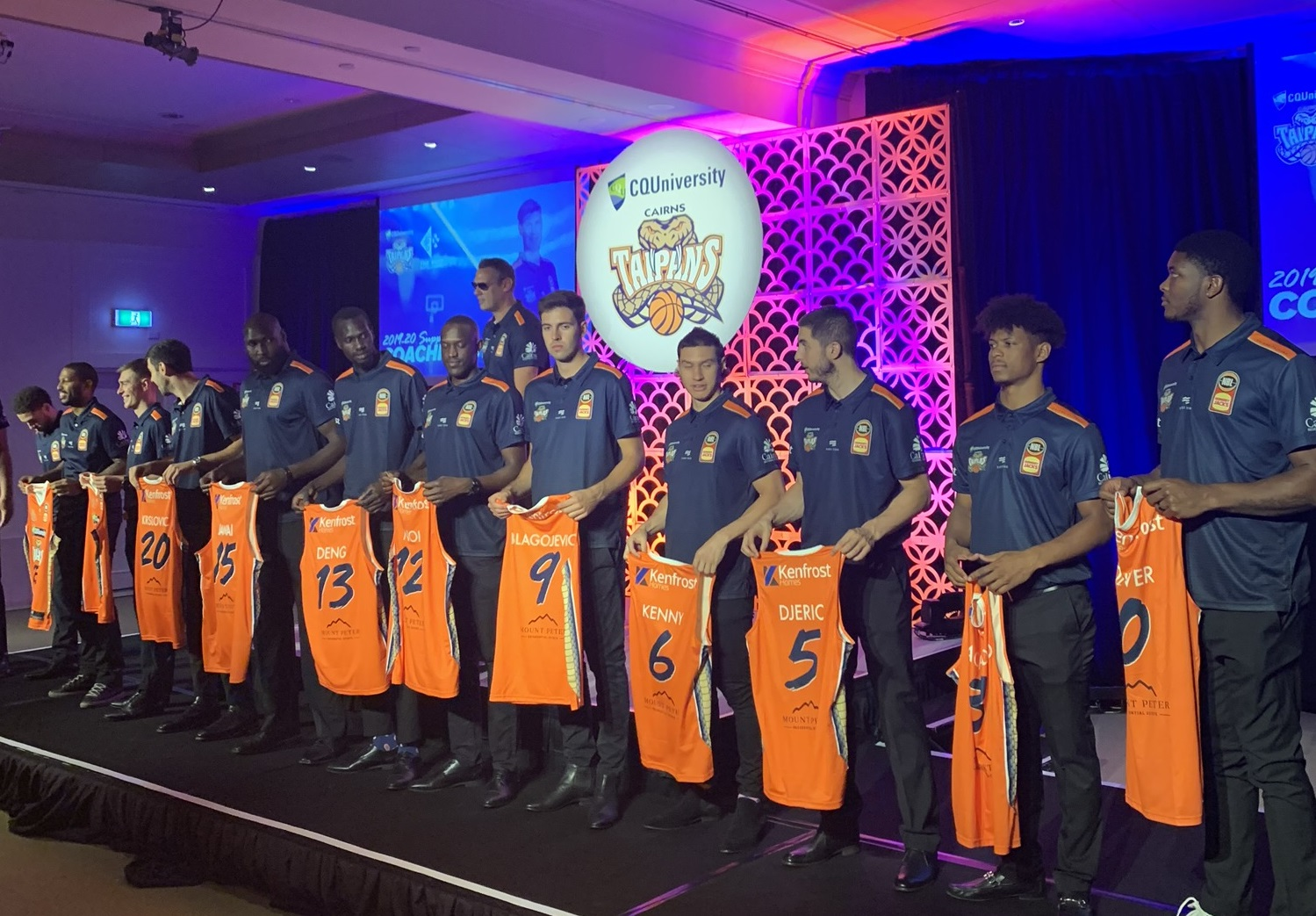
Cairns Taipans players in late 2019

Most teams have historically featured at least one and usually two American imports. Currently, teams are limited to having three imports (i.e., non-Australasians) on the roster at any one time; NBL initiatives in recent years have added two roster slots that may be filled by imports without counting against the three-import limit. Some of these players have moved to Australia permanently and become Australian citizens; a few including Cal Bruton, Mark Davis, Leroy Loggins and Ricky Grace have even played for the Australian national team (under a FIBA rule that allows one naturalised player to compete for a national team).

The NBL's salary cap for the 2006–07 season was A$776,000, and increased to A$810,000 for the 2007–08 season; the cap rose for two consecutive years due to the continued growth of the NBL. The salary cap rose A$1,000,000 for the 2009–10 season. The cap remains at A$1,000,000 for the 2012–13 season.

For the 2016–17 season, the salary cap was changed from a A$1,000,000 'hard cap' to a A$1,100,000 'soft cap'. Teams may exceed the soft cap provided that they pay a salary equalisation subsidy based on the extent to which they have exceeded the cap. In addition, player values for purposes of the salary cap are not based on the salary submitted to the NBL, but are determined by a special NBL panel. The cap regulations also mandate that teams distribute their salaries so that at least one group of five players has a collective cap value of no more than A$400,000. Both cap numbers (the soft cap and the 5-player aggregate cap) have increased since then, based on average NBL salaries.

On 9 May 2014, to help attract high-calibre imports or offer financial incentive for local stars considering overseas opportunities, the NBL introduced a marquee player rule, in which a team can nominate one player whose salary is paid outside the cap, with a 25% Marquee Player levy applied to any payment made above the salary cap. For the 2016–17 season, the value was modified so that if the marquee player is a "non-restricted" player (explained below), only the first $150,000 of that player's salary will be counted toward that team's salary cap.

NBL legend Andrew Gaze has pointed to these changes being instrumental to the improvement of NBL and its Australian players.

Also effective in 2016–17, the number of import roster slots was increased from two to three, and each team was allowed (but not required) to have one player from a FIBA Asia or FIBA Oceania country other than Australia or New Zealand on its roster who would not be counted against the import limit. Since then, the NBL has used the term "non-restricted" to describe all players signed as locals, including Asian/Oceanic players signed under the regional initiative. With this change, many of the best Asian-born players were expected to seek NBL contracts, as teams can now recruit them and play them as locals.

In 2020, the NBL reduced the number of imports per club from 3 to 2.

The maximum length of NBL player contracts is three years. The 2020–21 NBL salary cap has been set at $US 1,227,930, with one marquee 'local' player (including players with Asian or Oceania passports) and traditional imports exempt from the salary cap. Next Stars may also be exempt.

The salary cap will increase by another seven percent in the 2024–25 season to $1,947,662.58, making a fourteen percent jump since 2022–23 season, a $244,423 uplift.

The salary floor (the minimum each team must spend) sits at $1,752,913.85.

==== Next Stars Program ====
On 2 March 2018, the NBL announced the "Next Stars" initiative which would launch with the NBL's 2018–19 season. The scheme is designed to provide young elite overseas players, mainly Americans (who are currently barred from the NBA draft until one year out of secondary school), as well as Australians and New Zealanders considering U.S. college basketball, with a professional option immediately out of secondary school.

Each team received one additional import roster slot intended for a "Next Star" player. Players who will be part of the scheme will be selected by a special NBL panel and, should they accept the NBL's offer, be contracted directly by the NBL and placed into an allocation pool to be distributed among the NBL's teams. The chosen players will receive a salary of at least A$100,000, as well as a car, apartment, and flights home during NBL breaks. The scheme was funded for the first season by the NBL, meaning that "Next Star" players will not count against the salary cap. Finally, under current rules, the NBA allows its teams to spend up to US$700,000 to buy players out of professional contracts in non-North American leagues; should a "Next Star" be bought out by an NBA team (or by a team in another overseas league), the buyout amount will be split between the team and the NBL.

In April 2024, the NBL appointed NBA legend Kenny Smith, as Head of Next Stars' Player Initiatives (North America) for its Next Stars program. In June 2024, Carmelo Anthony joined the NBL's Next Stars program as a Global Ambassador. The appointment will also see Anthony join the ownership group of a future NBL expansion team.

The first player signed to a Next Star contract was American Brian Bowen, who signed on 7 August 2018 and was assigned to the Sydney Kings. As of July 2024, three players from the Next Stars Program have become top ten NBA draft picks: LaMelo Ball (third in 2020), Josh Giddey (sixth in 2021), and Alex Sarr (second in 2024). The 2024 NBA draft also saw four Next Stars players be drafted in total.

=== Uniforms ===
Since the 2020–21 season, Champion has supplied the uniforms for all teams in the NBL.

==== City Round ====
With the introduction of First Ever as uniform supplier in 2018, the NBL announced the "City" round. During this annual round, all teams wear limited edition jerseys which are specific to the city of their team.

==== Indigenous Round ====
In December 2018, the Illawarra Hawks and Sydney Kings wore Indigenous based jerseys to celebrate "the rich Indigenous culture within basketball as a whole."

After this successful launch, the NBL announced that in the 2019–20 season all teams would be competing in an Indigenous round.

== Honours ==
=== List of champions ===
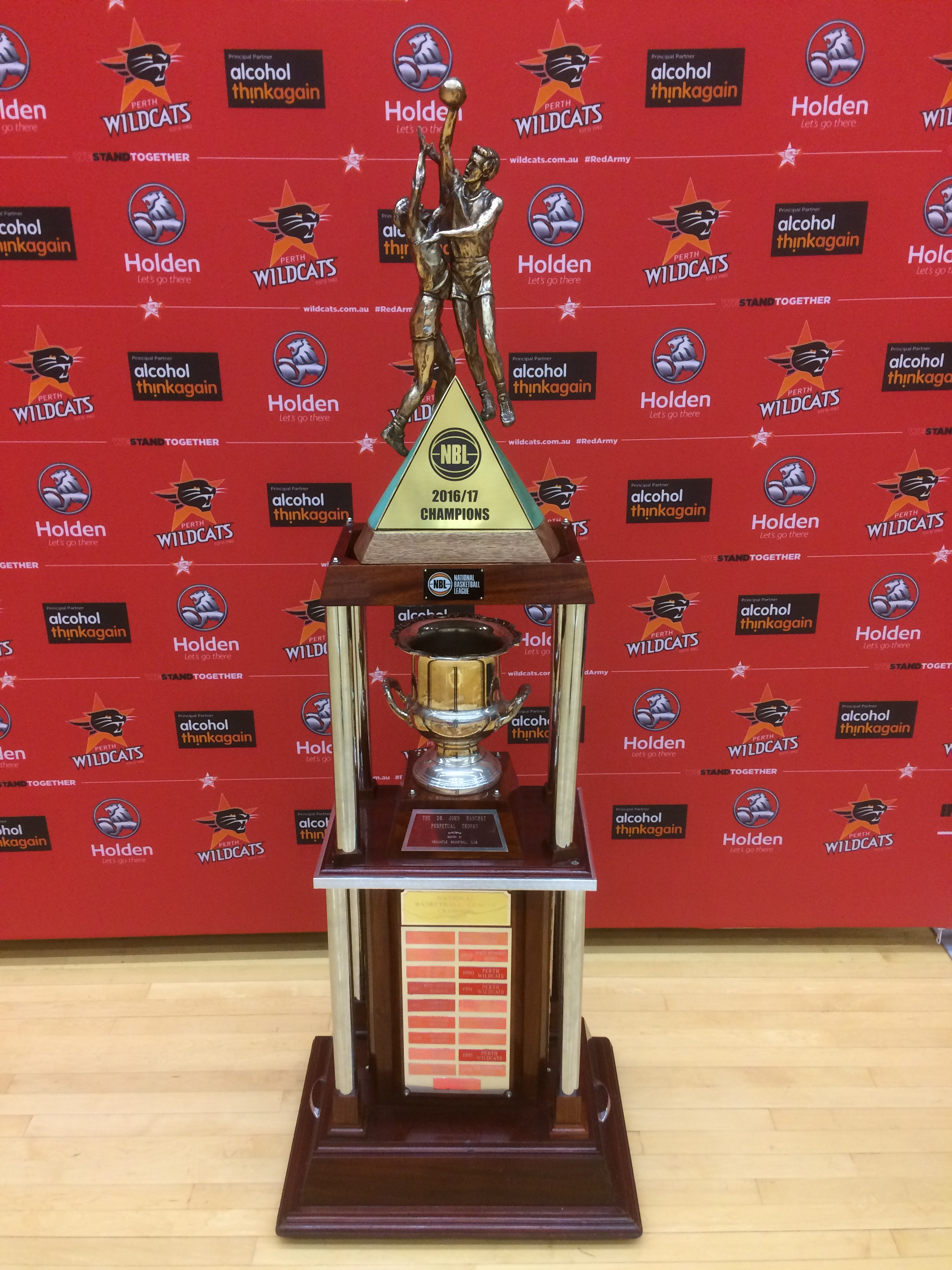
2016–17 Championship trophy

The Perth Wildcats have the most championships with 10 NBL Finals wins. Melbourne United and the Sydney Kings have the second most with six titles each.

Overview of NBL champions
Teams	Win	Loss	Total	Year(s) won	Year(s) runner-up
Perth Wildcats	10	6	16	1990, 1991, 1995, 2000, 2010, 2014, 2016, 2017, 2019, 2020	1987, 1993, 2003, 2012, 2013, 2021
Melbourne United	6	7	13	1993, 1997, 2006, 2008, 2018, 2021	1992, 1996, 2007, 2009, 2019, 2024, 2025
Sydney Kings	6	3	9	2003, 2004, 2005, 2022, 2023, 2026	2006, 2008, 2020
Adelaide 36ers	4	5	9	1986, 1998, 1999, 2002	1985, 1994, 2014, 2018, 2026
New Zealand Breakers	4	2	6	2011, 2012, 2013, 2015	2016, 2023
Brisbane Bullets	3	3	6	1985, 1987, 2007	1984, 1986, 1990
Canberra Cannons (folded in 2003)	3	2	5	1983, 1984, 1988	1979, 1989
Illawarra Hawks	2	3	5	2001, 2025	2005, 2010, 2017
North Melbourne Giants (folded in 1998)	2	2	4	1989, 1994	1988, 1995
South East Melbourne Magic (folded in 1998)	2	2	4	1992, 1996	1997, 1998
Southern Melbourne Saints (folded in 1991)	2	0	2	1979, 1980	—
West Adelaide Bearcats (folded in 1984)	1	2	3	1982	1980, 1983
Tasmania JackJumpers	1	1	2	2024	2022
Launceston Casino City (folded in 1983)	1	0	1	1981	—
South Dragons (folded in 2009)	1	0	1	2009	—
Eastside Spectres (folded in 1991)	0	2	2	—	1981, 1991
Victoria Titans (folded in 2004)	0	2	2	—	1999, 2000
West Sydney Razorbacks (folded in 2009)	0	2	2	—	2002, 2004
Cairns Taipans	0	2	2	—	2011, 2015
Geelong Cats (folded in 1996)	0	1	1	—	1982
Townsville Crocodiles (folded in 2016)	0	1	1	—	2001

Current team that has no NBL Finals appearances:

- South East Melbourne Phoenix

=== Regular season champions ===
Overview of League champions
Team	Title(s)	Winning season(s)	Last season title
Sydney Kings	8	2003, 2004, 2005, 2006, 2008, 2020, 2023, 2026	2026
Melbourne United	7	1994, 1996, 2016, 2018, 2021, 2022, 2024	2024
Adelaide 36ers	6	1986, 1987, 1988, 1999, 2000, 2017	2017
Perth Wildcats	6	1991, 1993, 1995, 2010, 2014, 2019	2019
Southern Melbourne Saints^{†}	3	1979, 1980, 1981	1981
South East Melbourne Magic^{†}	3	1992, 1997, 1998	1998
Brisbane Bullets	3	1984, 1985, 2007	2007
New Zealand Breakers	3	2011, 2012, 2013	2013
Geelong Cats^{*}	2	1983, 1984	1984
Victoria Titans^{†}	2	2001, 2002	2002
West Adelaide Bearcats^{#}	1	1982	1982
Sydney Supersonics^{†}	1	1983	1983
Canberra Cannons^{†}	1	1989	1989
North Melbourne Giants^{†}	1	1990	1990
South Dragons^{†}	1	2009	2009
Cairns Taipans	1	2015	2015
Illawarra Hawks	1	2025	2025
^{†} Defunct club.^{*} Former club, now competes in NBL1 South.^{#} Former club, now competes in NBL1 Central.

Note: In 1983 and 1984, the NBL was split into Eastern and Western divisions during the regular season.

Current teams that have no NBL regular season titles:

- South East Melbourne Phoenix
- Tasmania JackJumpers

=== Hall of Fame ===
The NBL Hall of Fame was instituted by the NBL in 1998 as part of their 20th season celebrations, to recognise the outstanding players, coaches, referees and contributors to the NBL. In 2010, the NBL Hall of Fame united with the Basketball Australia Hall of Fame to create the Australian Basketball Hall of Fame.

To be eligible for induction into the Hall of Fame, NBL candidates must have fulfilled the following criteria:

- Players must have made an outstanding contribution to the NBL, have been retired for a minimum of four seasons, and have played 100 NBL games or more.
- Coaches must have made an outstanding contribution to the NBL, have been retired for at least four seasons, and have been an NBL head coach for 10 seasons or more.
- Referees must have made an outstanding contribution to the NBL and have been retired for at least four seasons.
- Contributors must have made an outstanding contribution to the NBL, and may be elected at any time.

=== Awards ===
- 25th Anniversary Team (2003)
- 20th Anniversary Team (1998)
- Most Valuable Player
- Most Valuable Player – Grand Final
- Coach of the Year
- Next Generation Award
- Rookie of the Year (defunct)
- Most Improved Player
- Best Defensive Player
- Best Sixth Man
- Good Hands Award (defunct)
- Most Efficient Player (defunct)
- All-NBL Team
- Scoring champions

== Road trips ==
Doomsday Double
The Doomsday Double, involving a road trip to play the Adelaide 36ers and the Perth Wildcats during the same round, has occurred 141 times as at the end of the 2010–11 season. Only four teams have won both legs of the trip, played either on consecutive nights or on a Friday night and Sunday afternoon. Due to the long time success rate of both the 36ers and the Wildcats, the Double has long been considered the toughest two games in one weekend road trip in the NBL. The Doomsday Double was given its name by Hall of Famer Cal Bruton during its early days when the trip was a game in Perth on the Friday night followed by Adelaide the following night or vice versa.

Sunshine Swing
Similar to the Doomsday Double, the Sunshine Swing pits teams against an away double or even triple game schedule against opponents from the state of Queensland, in the same round. The most frequent combinations have featured the Brisbane Bullets/Gold Coast Rollers or Cairns Taipans/Townsville Crocodiles double. Other variants include Brisbane Bullets/Cairns Taipans (current version), Brisbane Bullets/Townsville Crocodiles and the Brisbane Bullets/Cairns Taipans/Townsville Crocodiles triple.

== NBLxNBA ==
NBLxNBA is a series involving clubs from the NBL and the National Basketball Association (NBA) of Northern America. The series started in 2017 for each organisation's 2017–18 season, and each season includes between two and seven games. The games have always been held in the U.S. and Canada, and typically are held during September and early October.

On 11 March 2025, the National Basketball Association and the Victoria State Government announced that the New Orleans Pelicans would play two exhibition games at Rod Laver Arena in Melbourne, Victoria against Melbourne United and the S.E. Melbourne Phoenix as part of the NBAxNBL: Melbourne Series. This will mark the first time an NBA team has played in Australia, and the first time that the S.E. Melbourne Phoenix have played against an NBA team.

== NBL All-Star Game ==
The NBL All-Star Game is an event that was first contested in 1982 by East and West teams. It was revived in 1988 when North and South teams competed. This match was played annually until 1997. In 2003–04 season the concept was revived with an east–west match being held in Melbourne. The following season saw a change of format, with a local team (Aussie All-Stars) playing an imports team (World All-Stars). This was discontinued after the 2007–08 season. The concept was revived in 2012 with an All-Star game between North and South that was scheduled for December 2012.

== NBL Anniversary Teams ==
=== 20th Anniversary (1998) ===
The NBL 20th Anniversary Team was a select group of 11 players chosen in 1998 to commemorate the 20th anniversary of the National Basketball League. The selection process involved basketball experts and officials evaluating players based on achievements (championships, All-NBL honors, and statistical dominance). The list consisted of the following players:

- Mark Bradtke
- Cal Bruton
- James Crawford
- **Mark Davis**
- **Scott Fisher**
- Andrew Gaze
- Leroy Loggins
- Herb McEachin
- Larry Sengstock
- Phil Smyth
- **Andrew Vlahov**

-In bold: players active in 1998.

=== 25th Anniversary (2003) ===
The NBL 25th Anniversary Team was a select group of 10 players chosen in 2003 to commemorate the 25th anniversary of the National Basketball League. It was selected in 2003 by a 32-member committee voting on top players with at least 100 games. NBL announced its 25th Anniversary All-Time team on 9 December 2003. Andrew Gaze received the most points in the voting process and he was also named the 25th Anniversary Most Valuable Player.

The 25th Team added players from the 1990s, such as Ricky Grace and Rob Rose who replaced Cal Bruton and Andrew Vlahov.. The list consisted of the following players:

- Andrew Gaze (287 votes)
- Leroy Loggins (255 votes)
- Mark Bradtke (179 votes)
- James Crawford (127 votes)
- Phil Smyth (102 votes)
- **Ricky Grace** (99 votes)
- **Scott Fisher** (93 votes)
- Mark Davis (69 votes)
- Larry Sengstock (65 votes)
- **Rob Rose** (64 votes)

-In bold: players active in 2003.

Also coaches were voted via a poll among the league's selection committee, and Brian Goorjian topped the voting. The Top3 list:

- Brian Goorjian (19 votes)
- Brian Kerle (4 votes)
- Lindsay Gaze (2 votes)

=== 40th Anniversary (2018) ===
The 40th Anniversary Team, announced in 2018, named first and second teams of five players each (total 10) and incorporated fan voting alongside a shortlist. Andrew Gaze and then, Mark Bradtke received most votes as more than 6000 people voted for a starting five from a list of 40 players over a three-week period.

Starting five

- Andrew Gaze
- Mark Bradtke
- Leroy Loggins
- James Crawford
- Ricky Grace

Second team

- Chris Anstey
- Shane Heal
- Rob Rose

== See also ==
- Basketball Australia
- Basketball in Australia
- List of attendance figures at domestic professional sports leagues – the NBL in a worldwide context
- List of National Basketball League (Australia) venues
- NBL All-time Records
- NBL1
- New Zealand National Basketball League (NZNBL)
- Women's National Basketball League (WNBL)
