= First Ever =

Australian sportswear company

First Ever Pty Ltd.
- Type: Private
- Industry: Textile
- Founded: (2018; 8 years ago)
- Founder: Justin Kestelman
- Headquarters: Melbourne, Australia
- Parent: LK Group
- Website: firstever.com

First Ever Pty Ltd. is an Australian manufacturing company located in Melbourne. The company was established in 2018, and was the official manufacturer and supplier of sportswear and clothing for the National Basketball League during the 2018–19 and 201920 seasons, and is the current manufacturer for Softball Australia. The company is also known for its production and distribution of "ath-street" clothing inspired by the culture and heritage of Melbourne.

== Company history ==
In a first for a major sporting league, the National Basketball League launched its own sports apparel brand in 2018 in an attempt to continuously grow basketball across Australia.

The "First Ever" brand began producing basketball related apparel in 2018, as well as supplying uniforms to both grassroots clubs and elite NBL teams across Australia.

The company's ultimate objective was outlined by owner Justin Kestelman, who stated the company would donate a portion of every uniform jersey to programs to ensure the future development of Australian basketball.

Kestelman, who co-owns the National Basketball League and Melbourne United with his father Larry, identified a gap in the market for an innovative Australian ath-street brand that was not just influenced by basketball culture, but connected with the broader community. Kestelman stated that the "...aim for First Ever [was] to inspire, style, create and collaborate with iconic fashion and sporting brands including the NBL."

In August 2019, the company unveiled their new project, "FE Custom", where customers could fully customise and order their own basketball gear, fully branded with the "First Ever" logo and shipped within 10 days.

On 12 March 2020, it was announced that First Ever would be replaced as official apparel partner of the National Basketball League, with major American apparel brand Champion being named as their successor for the 2020/21 season.

== Merchandising licensed manufacturer ==
The following is a list of the sporting organisations the company is licensed as the official manufacturer for:

- (Australia) National Basketball League – all teams - 2018–2020
- Softball Australia – national teams - 2019–present
