= Australia national basketball team =

Australia national basketball team may refer to:

- Australia men's national basketball team
- Australia women's national basketball team
- Australia men's national under-19 basketball team
- Australia men's national under-17 basketball team
- Australia women's national under-19 basketball team
- Australia women's national under-17 basketball team
