= NBL All-Star Game (Australia) =

Basketball game series

- Frequency: Annual
- Inaugurated: 1982 (Adelaide)
- Most recent: 2012–13 (Adelaide)
- Participants: North All-Stars; South All-Stars
- Organizer: National Basketball League
- Website: NBL.com.au

The NBL All-Star Game was a special event basketball game that has run in the past as part of the Australian National Basketball League. When held, the All-Star game has been between two teams composed of star players from that season.

The first NBL All-Star Game was held in 1982 at the Apollo Stadium in Adelaide with the East defeating the West 153–148 with Leroy Loggins taking the first of two All-Star MVP awards. It was next held in 1988 at The Glass House in Melbourne and was then held every season until 1997. After a seven-year hiatus, the NBL revived the All-Star game for the 2003–04 NBL season and it was held every season until 2007–08. For the 2012–13 season, the NBL brought back the All-Star game, having it played on 22 December 2012 at the Adelaide Arena.

The 1992, 1993 and 1994 All-Star games featured the Australian Boomers team playing against the USA Stars (1992) and the NBL Stars in 1993 and 1994. The 1992 game played at the AIS Arena in Canberra was played on 4 July and was promoted as the "Independence Day Challenge".

== All-Star games by season ==
Year	Result	Arena	City	MVP
1982	East 153, West 148	Apollo Stadium	Adelaide, SA	(United States) (Australia) Leroy Loggins, West Adelaide Bearcats
1988	North 127, South 122	The Glass House	Melbourne, VIC	(United States) (Australia) Leroy Loggins, Brisbane Bullets
1989	North 141, South 143	The Glass House	Melbourne, VIC	(Australia) Andrew Gaze, Melbourne Tigers
1990	North 139, South 119	Perth Entertainment Centre	Perth, WA	(United States) (Australia) Derek Rucker, Brisbane Bullets
1991	North 168, South 154	The Glass House	Melbourne, VIC	(United States) (Australia) Mark Davis, Adelaide 36ers
1992	Australia 149, USA Stars 132	AIS Arena	Canberra, ACT	(Australia) Andrew Gaze, Melbourne Tigers
1993	NBL Stars 124, Australia 119	Melbourne Park	Melbourne, VIC	(United States) Terry Dozier, Newcastle Falcons
1994	NBL Stars 101, Australia 133	Sydney Entertainment Centre	Sydney, NSW	(Australia) Tony Ronaldson, South East Melbourne Magic
1995	South Stars 138, North Stars 140	Clipsal Powerhouse	Adelaide, SA	(United States) (Australia) Robert Rose, Adelaide 36ers
1996	South Stars 132, North Stars 146	Melbourne Park	Melbourne, VIC	(United States) (Australia) Darryl McDonald, North Melbourne Giants
1997	North Stars 151, South Stars 142	Sydney Entertainment Centre	Sydney, NSW	(United States) (Australia) Derek Rucker, Brisbane Bullets
2003–04	West 126, East 129	State Netball Hockey Centre	Melbourne, VIC	(United States) (Nigeria) Ebi Ere, Sydney Kings
2004–05	Aussies 156, World 140	Townsville Entertainment Centre	Townsville, QLD	(Australia) Brad Newley, Townsville Crocodiles
2005–06	Aussies 151, World 116	Sydney Entertainment Centre	Sydney, NSW	(United States) (Australia) Darryl McDonald, Melbourne Tigers
2006–07	Aussies 133, World 136	Distinctive Homes Dome	Adelaide, SA	(United States) Rashad Tucker, Melbourne Tigers
2007–08	Aussies 146, World 141	State Netball Hockey Centre	Melbourne, VIC	(Australia) Nathan Jawai, Cairns Taipans
2012–13	South 134 v North 114	Adelaide Arena	Adelaide, SA	(Australia) Chris Goulding, Melbourne Tigers

=== Players with most MVP awards ===
Player	Wins	Editions
(United States) (Australia) Leroy Loggins	2	1982, 1988
(Australia) Andrew Gaze	2	1989, 1992
(United States) (Australia) Darryl McDonald	2	1996, 2006
(United States) (Australia) Derek Rucker	2	1990, 1997

== Wins by team (1982-2012) ==
Team	Wins	Years
North	5	1988, 1990, 1995, 1996, 1997
Aussies	3	2004–05, 2005–06, 2007–08
South	3	1989, 1991, 2012–13
Australia National Team	2	1992, 1994
West	1	1982
NBL Stars	1	1993
World All Stars	1	2006-07
East	1	2003-04
World All Stars	-	Runner-up 1992

== Players with most appearances ==
Player	All-Star	Editions	MVP
(Australia) Andrew Gaze	11	1988–1997, 2004	1989, 1992
(United States) James Crawford	10	1988–1997	-
(United States) (Australia) Leroy Loggins	9	1982–1988, 1990, 1993, 1994	1982, 1988
(United States) (Australia) Mark Davis	8	1988–1995	1991
(Australia) Mark Bradtke	6	1992–1994, 1996, 1997, 2005	-
(United States) (Australia) Darryl McDonald	5	1995–1997, 2006, 2007	1996, 2006
(United States) (Australia) Lanard Copeland	5	1992–1996, 2004	-
(Australia) Brett Maher	4	1996, 1997, 2005, 2006	-
(United States) Wayne McDaniel	4	1988-1991	-
(Australia) Al Green	3	1982, 1988, 1991	-

== Slam-Dunk champions ==
Year	Player	Team
1993	(Australia) Brett Rainbow	Melbourne Tigers
1994	(Australia) Brett Rainbow	Melbourne Tigers
1995	(Australia) Brett Rainbow (3)	Melbourne Tigers
1996	(Australia) Sam Mackinnon	South East Melbourne Magic
2005 (I)	(United States) Robert Brown	Townsville Crocodiles
2005 (II)	(New Zealand) Everard Bartlett	New Zealand Breakers
2006	(United States) Carlos Powell	New Zealand Breakers
2012	(United States) (Australia) Bennie Lewis	Melbourne Tigers

== 3-Point Shootout ==
Year	Player	Team
1991	(United States) (Australia) Scottie Fisher	North Melbourne Giants
1997	(United States) (Australia) Leroy Loggins	Brisbane Bullets
2003-2006	Not held	
2007	(United States) Troy DeVries	West Sydney Razorbacks
2012	(Australia) Stephen Weigh	Adelaide 36ers

== Distinctions ==
=== FIBA Hall of Fame ===
- (Australia) Andrew Gaze
- (Australia) Lindsay Gaze

=== Basketball Hall of Fame ===
- (Australia) Lindsay Gaze

=== FIBA's 50 Greatest Players (1991) ===
- (Australia) Andrew Gaze

== See also ==
- National Basketball League (Australia)

== Sources ==
- The Greatest NBL All-Star Performances ever
