= 1988 NBL All-Star Game =

1988 NBL Allstar Game

North	South
127	122
- Date: 23 April 1988
- Venue: The Glass House, Melbourne, Victoria
- Coaches: Brian Kerle (Brisbane Bullets); Cal Bruton (Perth Wildcats)
- MVP: Leroy Loggins (Brisbane Bullets)
- Referees: Eddie Crouch, Bill Mildenhall
- Attendance: 7,000

The 1988 NBL All-Star Game was the second official All-Star exhibition held by the National Basketball League (NBL) in Australia. Played on 23 April 1988 at The Glass House in Melbourne, Victoria, the game featured top players from the league's fourteen teams split into North and South teams, and drew a crowd of approximately 7,000 spectators.

== Game Summary ==
The North team, coached by Brian Kerle of the Brisbane Bullets, defeated the South team, led by Cal Bruton of the Perth Wildcats, by a score of 127–122. Leroy Loggins of the Brisbane Bullets was named Most Valuable Player (MVP) after scoring 22 points along with 5 assists and 3 steals.

== Teams ==
=== North ===
Representing: Brisbane Bullets, Canberra Cannons, Eastside Spectres, Illawarra Hawks, Melbourne Tigers, Newcastle Falcons, Sydney Kings

Coach: Brian Kerle (Brisbane Bullets)

Player	Club	Min	Reb	Ast	Stl	TO	Blk	Pts
Gordie McLeod	Illawarra Hawks	16	0	0	0	0	0	0
Darren Perry	Brisbane Bullets	11	2	0	0	2	0	1
Mark Dalton	Sydney Kings	10	5	2	0	1	1	2
Darren Lucas	Eastside Spectres	18	3	4	3	0	1	6
Michael Johnson	Newcastle Falcons	14	3	2	0	2	0	11
Dean Uthoff	Eastside Spectres	22	9	3	2	0	1	14
Willie Simmons	Canberra Cannons	26	9	3	1	3	8	15
Steve Carfino	Sydney Kings	36	5	7	3	2	0	18
Wayne McDaniel	Newcastle Falcons	32	9	3	2	3	1	18
James Bullock	Melbourne Tigers	25	6	3	2	5	0	20
Leroy Loggins	Brisbane Bullets	30	3	5	2	3	0	22

=== South ===
Representing: Adelaide 36ers, Geelong Supercats, Hobart Devils, North Melbourne Giants, Perth Wildcats, Westside Saints

Coach: Cal Bruton (Perth Wildcats)

Player	Club	Min	Reb	Ast	Stl	TO	Blk	Pts
Bruce Hope	Geelong Supercats	5	0	0	0	0	0	0
Brendan Joyce	Westside Saints	16	5	3	3	3	0	1
Mark Leader	North Melbourne Giants	14	3	3	0	2	0	6
Trevor Torrence	Perth Wildcats	13	0	1	1	3	0	7
Al Green	Adelaide 36ers	28	2	3	1	2	2	10
Jerry Dennard	Hobart Devils	16	4	2	0	0	0	13
James Crawford	Perth Wildcats	29	7	5	2	1	1	14
Tim Dillon	North Melbourne Giants	32	2	0	2	1	0	14
Bennie Lewis	Westside Saints	24	2	4	3	2	0	15
Joe Hurst	Hobart Devils	28	6	0	5	5	1	20
Mark Davis	Adelaide 36ers	35	15	2	3	4	2	22

== Highlights ==
- The NBL offered $10,000 in prize money, including $1,000 for MVP, $1,000 for Best Dunk, and $10,000 to the winning team.
- Promoters insured players for $1 million to cover potential injuries.
- Bruce Hope of Geelong suffered a season-ending Achilles tendon injury.
- James Bullock of Melbourne won the dunk of the game with a powerhouse slam over Mark Leader from the Giants.
