= Darnell Lazare =

American basketball player (born 1985)

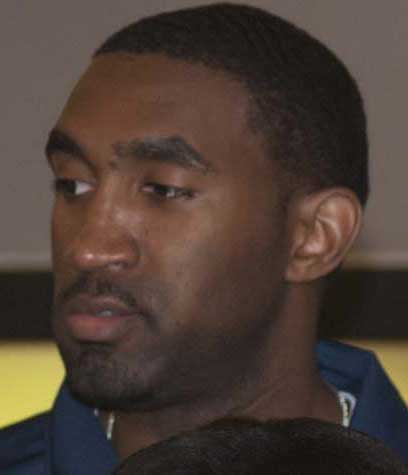
- Lazare in 2010

Memphis Grizzlies
- Title: Assistant coach
- League: NBA

Personal information
- Born: January 29, 1985 (age 41) Lafayette, Louisiana, U.S.
- Listed height: 6 ft 8 in (2.03 m)
- Listed weight: 240 lb (109 kg)

Career information
- High school: Woodlawn (Baton Rouge, Louisiana)
- College: LSU (2003–2007)
- NBA draft: 2007: undrafted
- Playing career: 2007–2015
- Position: Power forward
- Number: 33
- Coaching career: 2015–present

Career history

Playing
- 2007–2008: Gothia Basket
- 2008–2009: Dnipro Dnipropetrovsk
- 2009–2010: Maine Red Claws
- 2010–2012: Fort Wayne Mad Ants
- 2012–2013: Sydney Kings
- 2013: New Zealand Breakers
- 2014: Fort Wayne Mad Ants
- 2014: Idaho Stampede
- 2015: London Lightning

Coaching
- 2015–2016: Iowa Energy (assistant)
- 2018–2019: Memphis Grizzlies (assistant)
- 2024–2025: New Orleans Pelicans (assistant)
- 2025–present: Memphis Grizzlies (assistant)

Career highlights
- NBL All-Star (2013); NBA D-League All-Star (2012); Ukrainian SuperLeague All-Star (2009)

Darnell Lazare (born January 29, 1985) is an American former professional basketball player who currently serves as an assistant coach for the Memphis Grizzlies of the National Basketball Association (NBA). He played college basketball for LSU.

== High school career ==
Lazare played his high school basketball for coach Kenny Almond at Woodlawn High School, Baton Rouge, Louisiana. Lazare averaged 15 points and 10 rebounds in his final year at Woodlawn, and won back-to-back basketball state championships at Woodlawn in his junior and senior seasons. Lazare was a two-year member of the Louisiana Sports Writers Association All-State team, two-year member of the Advocate's All-Metro team and three-year All-District honoree.

== College career ==
Lazare averaged just over 12 minutes a game in his freshman season at Louisiana State University. He played in all 29 games, starting eight of them. He averaged 2.9 points and 2.4 rebounds per game.

In his sophomore season, he played in 25 games (no starts), averaging 2.0 points and 1.2 rebounds per game.

In his junior season, he played in 36 games (15 starts), averaging 6.7 points and 3.4 rebounds per game.

In his senior season, he played in 30 games (25 starts), averaging 7.4 points and 4.5 rebounds per game.

== Professional career ==
Lazare went undrafted in the 2007 NBA draft. He later signed with Stal Ostrów Wielkopolski of Poland but left after pre-season. He then moved to Gothia Basket of Sweden for the 2007–08 season.

In 2008, he signed with Dnipro Dnipropetrovsk of Ukraine for the 2008–09 season.

In November 2009, he was acquired by the Maine Red Claws. During the 2009–10 season, Lazare averaged 10.5 points and 5.4 rebounds in 27 minutes per game in 50 games.

In November 2010, his rights were traded to the Fort Wayne Mad Ants for a second round pick. In November 2011, he was re-acquired by the Mad Ants. On December 10, 2011, he signed with the Indiana Pacers. However, he was later waived by the Pacers on December 23, 2011. He then returned to the Mad Ants.

On July 9, 2012, Lazare signed with the Sydney Kings for the 2012–13 NBL season. Lazare had a successful season with the Kings, being named the starting power forward for the North All-Star team. He scored a season high 25 points against the New Zealand Breakers on February 9, 2013.

On June 6, 2013, Lazare signed with the New Zealand Breakers for the 2013–14 NBL season. On October 28, 2013, Lazare was released by the Breakers just four games into the season.

On January 3, 2014, he was re-acquired by the Fort Wayne Mad Ants. On February 26, 2014, he was traded to the Idaho Stampede.

In 2015, he signed with the London Lightning of the National Basketball League of Canada. In July 2015, he joined the Memphis Grizzlies summer league roster.

== Coaching career ==
At the end of the 2014–2015 season, Lazare joined the Iowa Energy of the NBA Development League as an assistant coach.

After a year as a player development coach and assistant video coordinator for the Memphis Grizzlies, Lazare was hired by the New Orleans Pelicans as a player development coach prior to the 2019–20 NBA season and was brought back the following season.

On September 27, 2024, Lazare was promoted to assistant coach by the Pelicans.

On July 25, 2025, the Memphis Grizzlies hired Lazare as an assistant coach under head coach Tuomas Iisalo.
