= 2005–06 NBL All-Star Game =

The 2005/06 NBL All-Star Game was held at the Sydney Entertainment Centre in Sydney, New South Wales on 27 December 2005. The attendance for this All-Star game was 4783 spectators.

The Aussie All-Stars defeated the World All-Stars 151–116. Veteran Darryl McDonald from the Melbourne Tigers won the All-Star MVP award, registering 19 points, 10 assists, 5 rebounds and 6 steals. Game high scorers included Chris Anstey (22), Glen Saville (20) and McDonald for the Aussie All-Stars, and Cortez Groves (19), Mike Helms (16) and Dusty Rychart (14) for the World All-Stars.

While named in the World All-Stars squad, Rolan Roberts did not play in the All-Star game due to suffering a season-ending shoulder injury during the Dunk Competition.

== Line-up ==
=== Aussies ===
Head Coach: Brian Goorjian (Sydney Kings)

Name	Club
Chris Anstey	Melbourne Tigers
Mark Bradtke	Brisbane Bullets
C. J. Bruton	Sydney Kings
Martin Cattalini	Cairns Taipans
Brett Maher	Adelaide 36ers
Sam Mackinnon	Brisbane Bullets
Darryl McDonald	Melbourne Tigers
Scott McGregor	West Sydney Razorbacks
Glen Saville	Wollongong Hawks
Jason Smith	Sydney Kings

=== World ===
Head Coach: Phil Smyth (Adelaide 36ers)

Name	Club
Larry Abney	Townsville Crocodiles
Adam Ballinger	Wollongong Hawks
Bobby Brannen	Brisbane Bullets
Willie Farley	Adelaide 36ers
Cortez Groves	Wollongong Hawks
Mike Helms	Hunter Pirates
Shawn Redhage	Perth Wildcats
Rolan Roberts	Sydney Kings
Dusty Rychart	Adelaide 36ers
Dave Thomas	Melbourne Tigers
Liu Wei – Invitational	Shanghai Sharks

== Dunk Competition ==
The Dunk Competition was won by Everard Bartlett of the New Zealand Breakers.

Other competitors in the Dunk Competition included:

- Larry Abney (Townsville Crocodiles)
- Deba George (Cairns Taipans)
- Cortez Groves (Wollongong Hawks)
- Rolan Roberts (Sydney Kings)
- Liam Rush (Perth Wildcats)
- Pero Vasiljevic (West Sydney Razorbacks)

== See also ==
- NBL (Australia) All-Star Game
- National Basketball League (Australia)
