= 2012 NBL All-Star Game =

The 2012 National Basketball League All-Star Game was held at the 8,000 seat Adelaide Arena in Adelaide, South Australia on 22 December 2012. The game was won by the South All-Stars, 134 points to the North All-Stars 114. Melbourne Tigers shooting guard Chris Goulding electrified the 4,523 in attendance, scoring 24 points (including several Slam dunks), grabbing 5 rebounds and handing out 4 assists on his way to winning the game's MVP award. The game was broadcast on Network Ten in Australia and it was the first NBL All-Star Game since 2007–08.

The game was played between the South All-Stars – represented by players from the Adelaide 36ers, Melbourne Tigers, New Zealand Breakers and Perth Wildcats – and the North All-Stars – represented by players from the Cairns Taipans, Sydney Kings, Townsville Crocodiles and Wollongong Hawks. Starters from both teams were announced on 6 December 2012, while the reserves were named on 13 December. Australian basketball fans selected both starting lineups via the NBL website while the NBL selected the reserves.

As the game was played in Adelaide, the South All-Stars was designated the "home" team and were coached by dual and reigning NBL championship winning coach, Andrej Lemanis of the New Zealand Breakers, whilst the North All-Stars were coached by Wollongong Hawks head coach Gordie McLeod. The coaches were decided upon due to the Breakers and Hawks having the best records of the teams representing the North and South following Round 9 of the 2012–13 NBL season. NBL Hall of Fame members Mark Davis (South) and Cal Bruton (North) were named as the assistant coaches.

== Line-up ==
=== South All-Stars ===
Head Coach: Andrej Lemanis (New Zealand Breakers)
Assistant Coach: Mark Davis

==== Starters ====
| Name | Club | Position |
|---|---|---|
| Jonny Flynn* | Melbourne Tigers | Point guard |
| Cedric Jackson | New Zealand Breakers | Shooting guard |
| Thomas Abercrombie | New Zealand Breakers | Small forward |
| Seth Scott | Melbourne Tigers | Power forward |
| Daniel Johnson* | Adelaide 36ers | Centre |

*Daniel Johnson was selected as a starter for the South Stars after Perth Wildcats centre Matthew Knight was ruled out with a torn calf muscle.
*Jonny Flynn was selected as a starter for the South Stars after Perth Wildcats guard Kevin Lisch was ruled out with a groin injury.

==== Reserves ====
| Name | Club | Position |
|---|---|---|
| Jason Cadee* | Adelaide 36ers | Guard |
| Adam Gibson | Adelaide 36ers | Guard |
| Chris Goulding | Melbourne Tigers | Guard |
| Stephen Weigh* | Adelaide 36ers | Forward |
| Shawn Redhage | Perth Wildcats | Forward |

*Jason Cadee was added to the South Stars bench after starter Kevin Lisch withdrew with injury and was replaced as a starter by Jonny Flynn.
*Stephen Weigh was added to the South Stars bench after Anthony Petrie withdrew with a back injury.

=== North All-Stars ===
Head Coach: Gordie McLeod (Wollongong Hawks)
Assistant Coach: Cal Bruton

==== Starters ====
| Name | Club | Position |
|---|---|---|
| Adris Deleon | Wollongong Hawks | Point guard |
| Ben Madgen | Sydney Kings | Shooting guard |
| Oscar Forman | Wollongong Hawks | Small forward |
| Darnell Lazare | Sydney Kings | Power forward |
| Cameron Tragardh | Cairns Taipans | Centre |

==== Reserves ====
| Name | Club | Position |
|---|---|---|
| Gary Ervin | Townsville Crocodiles | Guard |
| Jamar Wilson* | Cairns Taipans | Guard |
| Lance Hurdle | Wollongong Hawks | Guard |
| Peter Crawford* | Townsville Crocodiles | Guard/forward |
| Clint Steindl | Cairns Taipans | Forward |

*Peter Crawford was added to the North All-Stars bench after Sydney Kings centre Ian Crosswhite withdrew with an ankle injury.
*Jamar Wilson was added to the North All-Stars bench after Sydney Kings guard Corin Henry was forced to withdraw after collapsing at a Kings practice and being taken to hospital.

== Boxscore ==
Starters marked with a *

=== South All-Stars ===
| Player | Team | Min | Fgm | Fga | 3ptm | 3pta | Ftm | Fta | Reb | Ast | Pts |
|---|---|---|---|---|---|---|---|---|---|---|---|
| Adam Gibson | ADE | 18:05 | 4 | 5 | 3 | 3 | 0 | 0 | 1 | 2 | 11 |
| Jonny Flynn* | MEL | 19:56 | 3 | 6 | 1 | 2 | 0 | 0 | 5 | 10 | 7 |
| Cedric Jackson* | NZB | 20:23 | 6 | 13 | 0 | 4 | 0 | 0 | 2 | 7 | 12 |
| Jason Cadee | ADE | 18:55 | 2 | 5 | 1 | 4 | 0 | 0 | 3 | 6 | 5 |
| Thomas Abercrombie* | NZB | 19:47 | 7 | 10 | 1 | 3 | 0 | 0 | 6 | 1 | 15 |
| Seth Scott* | MEL | 25:02 | 8 | 14 | 1 | 5 | 2 | 2 | 9 | 2 | 19 |
| Daniel Johnson* | ADE | 23:47 | 9 | 14 | 3 | 5 | 0 | 0 | 4 | 0 | 21 |
| Stephen Weigh | ADE | 18:01 | 3 | 6 | 2 | 3 | 0 | 0 | 6 | 1 | 8 |
| Shawn Redhage | PER | 16:13 | 6 | 9 | 0 | 1 | 0 | 0 | 8 | 4 | 12 |
| Chris Goulding | MEL | 19:51 | 10 | 20 | 4 | 10 | 0 | 0 | 5 | 4 | 24 |
| TOTAL | | 200 | 58 | 102 | 16 | 40 | 2 | 2 | 49 | 37 | 134 |

=== North All-Stars ===
| Player | Team | Min | Fgm | Fga | 3ptm | 3pta | Ftm | Fta | Reb | Ast | Pts |
|---|---|---|---|---|---|---|---|---|---|---|---|
| Ben Madgen* | SYD | 17:48 | 4 | 11 | 0 | 4 | 0 | 0 | 2 | 5 | 8 |
| Adris Deleon* | WOL | 20:56 | 7 | 12 | 3 | 7 | 1 | 2 | 5 | 9 | 18 |
| Jamar Wilson | CAI | 17:23 | 1 | 6 | 0 | 0 | 0 | 0 | 2 | 3 | 2 |
| Oscar Forman* | WOL | 21:36 | 3 | 7 | 2 | 5 | 0 | 0 | 5 | 0 | 8 |
| Clint Steindl | CAI | 14:04 | 3 | 7 | 2 | 5 | 0 | 0 | 2 | 1 | 8 |
| Gary Ervin | TVL | 22:27 | 6 | 14 | 3 | 7 | 1 | 2 | 7 | 8 | 16 |
| Cameron Tragardh* | CAI | 19:34 | 5 | 10 | 0 | 0 | 0 | 0 | 4 | 0 | 10 |
| Lance Hurdle | WOL | 22:33 | 8 | 13 | 2 | 6 | 0 | 0 | 2 | 3 | 18 |
| Peter Crawford | TVL | 17:27 | 3 | 7 | 2 | 5 | 0 | 0 | 1 | 3 | 8 |
| Darnell Lazare* | SYD | 26:00 | 9 | 13 | 0 | 0 | 0 | 0 | 11 | 1 | 18 |
| TOTAL | | 200 | 49 | 100 | 14 | 39 | 2 | 4 | 41 | 33 | 114 |

== Game data ==
Network Ten

22 December 2012

North All-Stars 114, South All-Stars 134

Adelaide Arena, Adelaide
Attendance: 4,523

- Venue: Adelaide Arena
- Attendance: 4,523
- MVP: Chris Goulding (South)
- Television: Network Ten
- Announce Team: Steve Carfino, Andrew Gaze and Brett Maher
- Sideline Interviewer: Ian Shuttleworth

== Slam Dunk Competition ==
The Slam Dunk Competition was contested by the following players:

- Thomas Abercrombie (New Zealand Breakers)
- Lance Hurdle (Wollongong Hawks)
- Darnell Lazare (Sydney Kings)
- Lucas Walker (Melbourne Tigers)
- Bennie Lewis (Melbourne Tigers)

Mitch Creek (Adelaide 36ers) was originally selected to take part in the competition but suffered a ruptured Achilles tendon on 15 December against the Townsville Crocodiles. 36ers team mate Pero Vasiljevic who originally named as the reserve but has declined to take part. The NBL called up Bennie Lewis (Melbourne Tigers) as the replacement after an extensive social media campaign by Tigers fans.

Bennie Lewis was the eventual winner.

== 3 Point Shootout ==
In 2012 the 3-Point Shootout made its return to the NBL All-Star day. It was fought out between the following 5 players:

- Peter Crawford (Townsville Crocodiles)
- Oscar Forman (Wollongong Hawks)
- Lance Hurdle (Wollongong Hawks)
- Ben Madgen (Sydney Kings)
- Stephen Weigh (Adelaide 36ers)

Stephen Weigh was the eventual winner.

== See also ==
- NBL All-Star Game (Australia)
- National Basketball League (Australasia)
- 2012–13 NBL season
