= Brad Newley =

Australian basketball player (born 1985)

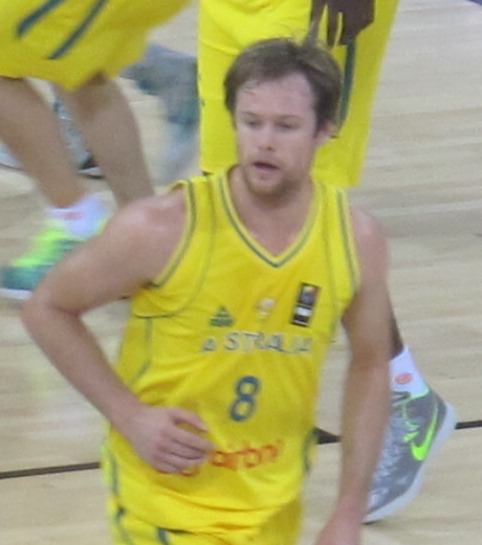
- Newley playing with Australia in 2014

Personal information
- Born: 18 February 1985 (age 41) Adelaide, South Australia, Australia
- Listed height: 198 cm (6 ft 6 in)
- Listed weight: 96 kg (212 lb)

Career information
- High school: Mountain Creek State (Sunshine Coast, Queensland); Pasadena (Adelaide, South Australia); Lake Ginninderra (Canberra, Australian Capital Territory)
- NBA draft: 2007: 2nd round, 54th overall pick
- Drafted by: Houston Rockets
- Playing career: 2002–2024
- Position: Small forward / shooting guard

Career history
- 2002: Forestville Eagles
- 2003–2004: Australian Institute of Sport
- 2004–2007: Townsville Crocodiles
- 2005: Forestville Eagles
- 2007–2008: Panionios
- 2008–2009: Panellinios
- 2009–2010: Beşiktaş
- 2010–2012: Lietuvos rytas
- 2012: Valencia
- 2012–2016: Gran Canaria
- 2016–2021: Sydney Kings
- 2017: AEK Athens
- 2021–2024: Melbourne United
- 2023–2024: Frankston Blues

Career highlights
- LKL All-Star (2011); GBL All-Star (2008); 2× All-NBL Second Team (2007, 2017); NBL Rookie of the Year (2005); NBL Best Sixth Man (2005); NBL All-Star Game MVP (2005); Gaze Medal winner (2011)
- Stats at Basketball Reference
Medals
Men's basketball
Representing Australia
FIBA Oceania Championship
Gold medal – first place	2005 New Zealand
Gold medal – first place	2007 Australia
Silver medal – second place	2009 Australia & New Zealand
Gold medal – first place	2011 New Zealand
Gold medal – first place	2015 Australia & New Zealand
FIBA Asia Cup
Gold medal – first place	2017 Lebanon
Commonwealth Games
Gold medal – first place	2006 Melbourne	Team competition
Gold medal – first place	2018 Gold Coast	Team competition

Brad Newley (born 18 February 1985) is an Australian former professional basketball player. After starting his career in Australia with the Townsville Crocodiles, Newley was drafted 54th overall by the Houston Rockets in the 2007 NBA draft. He never played in the NBA and instead carved out a career in Europe, playing in Greece, Turkey, Lithuania, and Spain between 2007 and 2016. Between 2016 and 2024, he played in the National Basketball League (NBL) for the Sydney Kings and Melbourne United.

== Early life and career ==
Newley was born in Adelaide, South Australia. (Note: There are conflicting Adelaide suburbs listed as his birth place: NBL list Lower Mitcham while FIBA list Bedford Park.) During his primary school days, he lived in South Australia, Northern Territory, and Queensland. He attended Mountain Creek State High School on the Sunshine Coast before moving back to Adelaide and attending Pasadena High School. He attended Pasadena alongside future NBA player Joe Ingles.

In 2002, Newley played in the Central ABL for the Forestville Eagles. He moved to Canberra in 2003 to attend the Australian Institute of Sport (AIS) and Lake Ginninderra Secondary College. He played for the AIS men's team in the South East Australian Basketball League (SEABL), averaging 17.1 points and 3.9 rebounds per game in 2003, and 24.7 points, 5.5 rebounds and 2.6 assists per game in 2004. To cap off a successful 2004 SEABL season, Newley earned All-Eastern Conference first team honours and won the East Men's Australian Under-23 Youth Player of the Year award.

== Professional career ==
=== Townsville Crocodiles (2004–2007) ===
Following the 2004 SEABL season, Newley joined the Townsville Crocodiles of the National Basketball League (NBL). In the 2004–05 season, he was the MVP of the league's All-Star Game and earned Rookie of the Year and Best Sixth Man honours, becoming the first player in league history to win both awards. In 35 games, he averaged 16.0 points, 3.3 rebounds and 1.9 assists per game.

During the 2005 off-season, Newley re-joined the Forestville Eagles of the Central ABL. In six games, he averaged 24.3 points, 9.8 rebounds and 4.0 assists per game.

In the 2005–06 season, Newley averaged 19.3 points, 5.1 rebounds and 4.3 assists in 32 games for the Crocodiles.

After originally declaring for the 2006 NBA draft, Newley later withdrew his name and returned to the Crocodiles for the 2006–07 NBL season. He played in the 2006–07 NBL All-Star Game and was named to the All-NBL Second Team. In 35 games, he averaged 22.1 points, 5.2 rebounds and 3.2 assists per game.

In April 2007, Newley agreed to sign a two-year deal with the Adelaide 36ers.

=== 2007 NBA draft and Summer League ===
On 28 June 2007, Newley was selected with the 54th overall pick in the 2007 NBA draft by the Houston Rockets. He played for the Rockets in the NBA Summer League, where he averaged 3.3 points, 3.0 rebounds and 1.0 assists in three games with one start.

=== Panionios and Panellinios (2007–2009) ===
In August 2007, Newley signed with Panionios for the 2007–08 Greek Basket League season. In just his fourth league game, he scored 32 points, on 12-of-12 shooting, in a win over AEK Athens. By making 8-of-8 three-pointers in the game, he set a new record in the Greek Basket League competition. He was later named to the 2008 Greek League All-Star game. In 26 regular season games in the Greek League, he averaged 10.8 points, 3.5 rebounds, 1.0 assists and 1.3 steals per game, before averaging 8.3 points, 2.6 rebounds, 1.1 assists and 0.9 steals in 12 playoff games.

On 16 July 2008, Newley signed with Panellinios for the 2008–09 Greek Basket League season. In 26 regular season games in the Greek League, he averaged 11.0 points, 4.3 rebounds, 0.8 assists and 1.0 steals per game, before averaging 6.0 points and 5.5 rebounds in two playoff games.

Following the 2008–09 season, Newley once again played for the Houston Rockets in the NBA Summer League, where he averaged 6.8 points and 2.6 rebounds in five games with three starts.

=== Turkey and Lithuania (2009–2012) ===
On 21 July 2009, Newley signed with Beşiktaş of the Turkish Basketball Super League for the 2009–10 season.

On 28 May 2010, Newley signed a two-year deal with Lietuvos rytas of the Lithuanian Basketball League.

=== Spain (2012–2016) ===
In January 2012, Newley left Lietuvos rytas and signed with Spanish club Valencia of the Liga ACB for the rest of the 2011–12 season.

On 9 August 2012, Newley signed with Spanish club Gran Canaria for the 2012–13 ACB season. He re-signed with Canaria in 2013, 2014 and 2015.

In the 2014–15 season, Newley averaged 10.3 points, 3.5 rebounds, 0.8 assists and 1.1 steals per game, in 32 games played in the Spanish League, and 12.0 points, 3.3 rebounds, 1.1 assists, and 1.0 steals per game in the European-wide 2nd-tier level league, the EuroCup, as his team made it to the 2014–15 EuroCup Finals.

=== Sydney Kings and AEK Athens (2016–2021) ===
On 8 June 2016, Newley signed a three-year deal with the Sydney Kings of the Australian NBL. On 17 November 2016, he scored a season-high 34 points in a 93–80 loss to the Perth Wildcats. For the 2016–17 season, he was named to the All-NBL Second Team. Following the NBL season, Newley played in Greece for AEK Athens to complete the 2016–17 Greek League season.

Newley returned to the Kings for the 2017–18 NBL season.

On 29 March 2019, Newley re-signed with the Kings on a two-year deal. In the 2019–20 NBL season, the Kings won the minor premiership with a first-place finish and a 20–8 record and played in the NBL Grand Final series, where they lost 2–1 to the Perth Wildcats.

=== Melbourne United and Frankston Blues (2021–2024) ===
On 8 July 2021, Newley signed with Melbourne United for the 2021–22 NBL season.

On 17 May 2022, Newley re-signed with United for the 2022–23 NBL season. In December 2022, he played his 300th NBL game.

Newley joined the Frankston Blues for the 2023 NBL1 South season.

On 24 April 2023, Newley re-signed with United for the 2023–24 NBL season. On 14 February 2024, he announced that he would retire from the NBL at the conclusion of the 2023–24 season.

On 15 July 2023, Newley re-signed with the Frankston Blues for the 2024 NBL1 season.

=== NBA draft rights ===
In 2017, Newley's NBA draft rights were traded by the Houston Rockets to the Los Angeles Lakers. In 2022, his draft rights were traded by the Lakers to the New York Knicks.

== National team career ==
Newley was a member of the Australian Under-19 junior national team that won the gold medal at the 2003 FIBA Under-19 World Championship in Greece, where he scored 16 points against Lithuania in the final.

Newley made his senior debut with the Australian national basketball team in 2005. He helped the Boomers win gold at the 2006 Commonwealth Games. Additionally, he was selected in the Boomers squad for the 2006 FIBA World Championship. In this tournament, despite limited game time, he averaged 8.2 points, 2.5 rebounds and 1.3 assists per game. Newley was also selected to play in the 2008 Beijing Summer Olympics. He averaged 12.7 points per game, shooting at 57% from the field and 45% from three-point range during the Olympics.

Newley later represented Australia at the 2010 FIBA World Championship, the 2012 London Summer Olympics, and the 2014 FIBA Basketball World Cup.

== Personal life ==
Newley has one younger sister, Mia, who also plays basketball.

Newley and his wife Brigid have two children.

In April 2024, Newley joined the Melbourne United front office in the community and commercial departments as well as the club's player sponsorship program.
