= 2007–08 NBL All-Star Game =

The 2007–08 National Basketball League All-Star Game was held at the State Netball Hockey Centre in Melbourne, Victoria on 12 December 2007. The game was broadcast live on Fox Sports in Australia.

The game was won by the Aussie All-Stars, 146 points to the World All-Stars 141. Nathan Jawai of the Cairns Taipans electrified the 3,500 in attendance, scoring a double-double with 24 points (including several Slam dunks), 12 rebounds, 3 assists, 2 steals and 1 block. He was named as the MVP of the All-Star game. Jawai's Cairns Taipans team-mate Stephen Black top-scored for the Aussie All-Stars with 27 points, while Shawn Redhage led the scoring for the World All-Stars with 23 points.

== Line-ups ==
=== Aussie All-Stars ===
Head Coach: Brian Goorjian (Sydney Kings)

==== Starters ====
Name	Club	Position
Chris Anstey	Melbourne Tigers	Centre
Nathan Jawai	Cairns Taipans	Power forward
Mark Worthington	Sydney Kings	Small forward
Joe Ingles	South Dragons	Shooting guard
C.J. Bruton	Brisbane Bullets	Point guard

==== Reserves ====
Name	Club	Position
Paul Rogers	Perth Wildcats	Centre
David Barlow	Melbourne Tigers	Power forward
Glen Saville	Sydney Kings	Small forward
James Harvey	Gold Coast Blaze	Shooting guard
Stephen Black	Cairns Taipans	Point guard

=== World All-Stars ===
Head Coach: Al Westover (Melbourne Tigers)

==== Starters ====
Name	Club	Position
Adam Ballinger	Adelaide 36ers	Centre
Shawn Redhage	Perth Wildcats	Power forward
Ebi Ere	Brisbane Bullets	Small forward
Kirk Penney	New Zealand Breakers	Shooting guard
Corey Williams	Townsville Crocodiles	Point guard

==== Reserves ====
Name	Club	Position
Larry Abney	Cairns Taipans	Centre
Rod Grizzard	Singapore Slingers	Power forward
Kavossy Franklin	Wollongong Hawks	Small forward
Cortez Groves	South Dragons	Shooting guard
Darnell Hinson	West Sydney Razorbacks	Point guard

== Game data ==
Fox Sports

12 December 2007
19:00

boxscore

Aussie All-Stars	146–141	World All-Stars
Scoring by quarter: 37–28, 38–38, 38–37, 33–38
Pts: Black 27; Rebs: Jawai 12; Asts: Ingles 8		Pts: Redhage 23; Rebs: Ballinger, Grizzard 8 Asts: Williams 8
Aussie All-Stars win, 146–141

State Netball Hockey Centre, Melbourne
Attendance: 3,500

== See also ==
- NBL All-Star Game (Australia)
- 2007–08 NBL season
- National Basketball League (Australia)
