= 2004–05 NBL All-Star Game =

Coordinates: 19°15′2″S 146°49′39″E

2004/05 NBL All-Star Logo

The 2004/05 NBL All-Star Game was held at the Townsville Entertainment Centre in Townsville, Queensland on 19 January 2005. The attendance for this All-Star game was 5078 spectators.

The Aussie All-Stars defeated the World All-Stars 156–140. Rookie Brad Newley from the Townsville Crocodiles won the All-Star MVP award, contributing 35 points to the Aussie All-Stars total. Other leading scorers for the Aussie All-Stars included John Rillie with 23 points and Jason Smith with 22 points. For the World All-Stars Robert Brown top scored with 31 points, followed by Brian Wethers with 28 and Willie Farley with 24.

== Line-up ==
=== Aussies ===
Head Coach: Phil Smyth (Adelaide 36ers)

Name	Club
Stephen Black	Brisbane Bullets
Peter Crawford	Perth Wildcats
Stephen Hoare	Melbourne Tigers
Ben Knight	Sydney Kings
Brett Maher – Captain	Adelaide 36ers
Brad Newley	Townsville Crocodiles
Ben Pepper	New Zealand Breakers
John Rillie	Townsville Crocodiles
Glen Saville	Wollongong Hawks
Jason Smith	Sydney Kings

=== World ===
Head Coach: Brian Goorjian (Sydney Kings)

Name	Club
Robert Brown	Townsville Crocodiles
Chris Burgess	Cairns Taipans
Casey Calvary	Townsville Crocodiles
Willie Farley	Adelaide 36ers
Nick Horvath	West Sydney Razorbacks
Darnell Mee – Captain	Wollongong Hawks
Dusty Rychart	Adelaide 36ers
Dave Thomas	Melbourne Tigers
Rashad Tucker	Melbourne Tigers
Brian Wethers	Hunter Pirates

- Shane Heal was selected for the Aussies but he stepped down to allow younger players to come forward.

== Dunk Competition ==
The Dunk Competition was won by Robert Brown of the Townsville Crocodiles.

Other competitors in the Dunk Competition included:

- David Barlow (Sydney Kings)
- Oscar Forman (Adelaide 36ers)
- Deba George (Cairns Taipans)
- Liam Rush (Perth Wildcats)
- Brian Wethers (Hunter Pirates)

== See also ==
- NBL (Australia) All-Star Game
- National Basketball League (Australia)
