= Everard Bartlett =

New Zealand basketball player

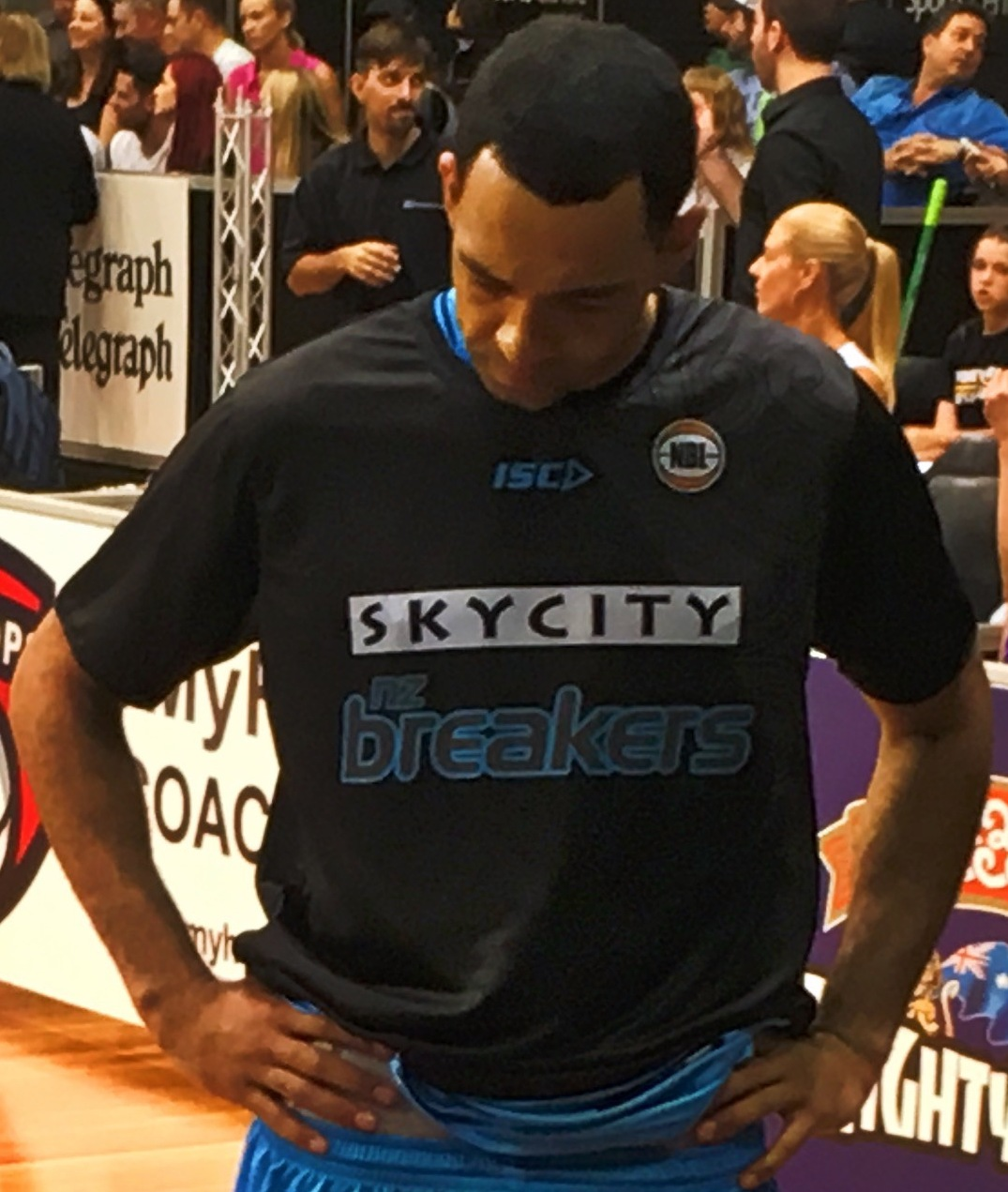
- Bartlett with the New Zealand Breakers in 2015

Personal information
- Born: 6 February 1986 (age 40) Hastings, New Zealand
- Listed height: 193 cm (6 ft 4 in)
- Listed weight: 85 kg (187 lb)

Career information
- High school: Church College (Hamilton, New Zealand); Wasatch Academy (Mount Pleasant, Utah)
- Playing career: 2005–2022
- Position: Shooting guard / point guard
- Coaching career: 2023–present

Career history

Playing
- 2005–2010: Hawke's Bay Hawks
- 2005–2007: New Zealand Breakers
- 2007–2008: Höttur
- 2011: Geraldton Buccaneers
- 2011: Auckland Pirates
- 2011: Perth Wildcats
- 2011–2012: Adelaide 36ers
- 2012–2014: Hawke's Bay Hawks
- 2012–2013: Perth Wildcats
- 2015: Ballarat Miners
- 2015–2016: New Zealand Breakers
- 2016: Southland Sharks
- 2017–2019: Hawke's Bay Hawks
- 2020: Franklin Bulls
- 2021–2022: Hawke's Bay Hawks

Coaching
- 2023: Hawke's Bay Hawks
- 2025–present: Chennai Heat

Career highlights
- NZNBL champion (2006)

Everard Verdon Bartlett (born 6 February 1986) is a New Zealand basketball coach and former professional player. Bartlett was a regular in the New Zealand National Basketball League (NZNBL) between 2005 and 2022, playing the majority of those years with the Hawke's Bay Hawks. He also had various stints in the Australian NBL for the New Zealand Breakers, Perth Wildcats and Adelaide 36ers, and was a regular with the New Zealand Tall Blacks between 2012 and 2016.

== Early life ==
Bartlett was born in Hastings, New Zealand. He grew up in the Flaxmere/Bridge Pa area and attended Irongate School for primary school. In high school, he first attended Church College in Hamilton before moving to the United States to attend Wasatch Academy in Utah.

== Playing career ==
=== New Zealand NBL ===
Bartlett debuted in the New Zealand NBL in 2005 with the Hawke's Bay Hawks. The following year, he won a championship with the Hawks. He left the Hawks following the 2010 season, and in 2011, he played for the Auckland Pirates. He returned to the Hawks for the 2012 season and played with them until the end of the 2014 season. After a season in Australia in 2015, Bartlett returned to the New Zealand NBL in 2016 to play for the Southland Sharks. In 2017, he re-joined the Hawks. In 2019, he helped the Hawks reach the NBL final, which marked his fifth trip to the championship round with the Hawks.

In June 2020, Bartlett was acquired by the Franklin Bulls for the 2020 season. He returned to the Hawks for the 2021 season, where he played in his sixth championship round with the Hawks. He returned to the Hawks for the 2022 season.

=== Australian NBL, Iceland, SBL and SEABL ===
Between 2005 and 2007, Bartlett was a development player with the New Zealand Breakers in the Australian NBL. During the 2005–06 season, he won the NBL Slam Dunk competition during the All-Star weekend, and during the 2006–07 season, he played two games for the Breakers.

For the 2007–08 season, Bartlett moved to Iceland to play for Höttur. In 16 games in the second-tier 1. deild karla, he averaged 28.1 points, 6.7 rebounds, 3.6 assists, and 2.4 steals per game.

Bartlett spent the 2010–11 NBL season as a training player with the Perth Wildcats. In November 2010, he played in the Malaysian International Basketball Championship with the Western Tigers touring team. In March 2011, he had a three-game stint with the Geraldton Buccaneers of the State Basketball League.

Bartlett returned to the Wildcats for the 2011–12 season to continue in a training player role. On 2 November 2011, he received a call-up to the playing roster as an injury replacement for Damian Martin. He appeared in six games for the Wildcats between 5 November and 27 November. On 17 December, Bartlett signed with the Adelaide 36ers as an injury replacement for Nathan Crosswell. In 16 games for the 36ers over the second half of the 2011–12 season, he averaged 5.9 points, 2.1 rebounds and 1.9 assists per game.

Bartlett returned to the Wildcats for the 2012–13 season on a full-time contract, and helped them reach the NBL Grand Final series, where they lost to the New Zealand Breakers. He appeared in all 32 games and averaged 5.2 points, 2.0 rebounds and 1.2 assists per game.

On 3 February 2015, Bartlett signed with the Ballarat Miners for the 2015 SEABL season. In 16 games for Ballarat, he averaged 12.3 points, 3.8 rebounds and 5.8 assists per game.

Bartlett made a return to the Australian NBL in the 2015–16 season, joining the Breakers for a second stint. He helped the Breakers reach the NBL Grand Final series, where they lost to the Perth Wildcats. In 32 games, he averaged 4.7 points and 1.2 rebounds per game.

=== National team ===
Bartlett was a regular with the New Zealand Tall Blacks between 2012 and 2016, playing at the 2012 FIBA World Olympic Qualifying Tournament, 2013 FIBA Oceania Championship, 2014 FIBA Basketball World Cup, 2015 FIBA Oceania Championship, and 2016 FIBA World Olympic Qualifying Tournament.

== Coaching career ==
In January 2023, Bartlett was appointed head coach of the Hawke's Bay Hawks on a three-year deal. Following the 2023 New Zealand NBL season, his contract was terminated by the Hawks.

In January 2025, Bartlett was appointed head coach of the Chennai Heat of the Indian National Basketball League.

== Personal life ==
Bartlett and his wife Lillian have two sons.
