= Bill Mildenhall =

Australian rules footballer and basketball referee

Personal information
- Full name: William Stanley Mildenhall
- Born: 10 April 1953 (age 73)
- Original team: St Kilda City
- Height: 180 cm (5 ft 11 in)
- Weight: 76 kg (168 lb)

Playing career^{1}
Years	Club	Games (Goals)
1974–79, 1981–82	St Kilda	77 (17)
- ^{1} Playing statistics correct to the end of 1982.

William Stanley Mildenhall (born 10 April 1953) is a former basketball referee in the National Basketball League who also played Australian rules football with St Kilda in the Victorian Football League (VFL).

Mildenhall, who debuted in 1974, made few appearances early in his career due to injury. He had his best seasons in 1976 and 1977, as a back pocket, playing 40 of a possible 44 games. For the rest of his career he was again in and out of the team, but this time it was because he had taken up basketball refereeing in 1979.

Mildenhall refereed in the NBL between 1979 and 2011, and also officiated in the 1992 Barcelona and 2000 Sydney Olympics.

In 2005, Mildenhall went past Eddie Crouch's league record of officiating in 802 matches, reaching a total of 945 by his retirement in 2011. He also holds the record for being awarded "NBL Referee of the Year" on the most occasions, winning the accolade 16 times consecutively between 1988 and 2003.
