= Bennie Lewis =

American-Australian basketball player (born 1987)

No. 22 – Waverley Falcons
- Position: Shooting guard / small forward
- League: NBL1 South

Personal information
- Born: 29 June 1987 (age 39) Melbourne, Victoria, Australia
- Listed height: 203 cm (6 ft 8 in)
- Listed weight: 84 kg (185 lb)

Career information
- High school: East St. Louis (East St. Louis, Illinois)
- College: Benedict (2005–2009)
- NBA draft: 2009: undrafted
- Playing career: 2009–present

Career history
- 2009: Decatur Court Kings
- 2009–2013: Melbourne Tigers (NBL)
- 2010–2011: Melbourne Tigers (Big V)
- 2012: Waverley Falcons
- 2013: Perth Redbacks
- 2013–2014: Fort Wayne Mad Ants
- 2014–2015: Geraldton Buccaneers
- 2015: Plymouth Raiders
- 2016–2018: Frankston Blues
- 2016–2017: Melbourne United
- 2019; 2021–: Waverley Falcons

Career highlights
- SBL All-Star Five (2015); WBA Rookie of the Year (2009); All-WBA First Team (2009); Second-team All-SIAC (2008)

Bennie James Lewis III (born 29 June 1987) is an American-Australian basketball player for the Waverley Falcons of the NBL1 South. He played college basketball for Benedict College in the United States before playing the majority of his career in Australia. He played four seasons for the Melbourne Tigers in the National Basketball League (NBL) between 2009 and 2013. He went on to played many seasons in the Australian state leagues, including the Big V, State Basketball League, South East Australian Basketball League, and NBL1. In 2015, he was named in the SBL All-Star Five.

== Early life and high school ==
Lewis was born in Melbourne, Australia, while his father played in the National Basketball League. He was later raised in Fort Wayne, Indiana, and moved to East St. Louis, Illinois, the beginning of his junior year in high school.

As a junior at East St. Louis in 2003–04, Lewis averaged 3.7 points and 1.2 rebounds in 27 games for the Flyers. As a senior in 2004–05, he averaged 10.5 points, 4.5 rebounds, 2.7 assists and 1.4 steals in 27 games. He earned All-Tournament Team honors at the Thanksgiving Holiday Tournament.

== College career ==
As a freshman at Benedict College in 2005–06, Lewis helped the Tigers go 22–7 on the season and helped them win the conference championship. They earned a spot in the NCAA Division II Tournament, where they were knocked out in the first round. In 29 games, he made seven starts and averaged 5.2 points and 2.0 rebounds in 12.5 minutes per game.

As a sophomore in 2006–07, Lewis helped the Tigers go 25–5 on the season and helped them win the conference championship for a second straight year. They earned a spot in the NCAA Division II Tournament where they were again knocked out in the first round. In 30 games, he made three starts and averaged 6.6 points and 2.3 rebounds in 14.5 minutes per game.

As a junior in 2007–08, Lewis earned second-team All-SIAC, Paine Classic Tournament MVP, and NCAA D2 South Region All-Tournament Team honors. He helped the Tigers go 28–5 on the season and helped them win the conference championship for a third straight year. The Tigers won the SIAC Tournament and reached the third round of the NCAA Division II Tournament. In 32 games, he made 14 starts and averaged 11.3 points, 3.8 rebounds and 1.5 assists in 29.6 minutes per game.

As a senior in 2008–09, Lewis helped the Tigers go 24–6 on the season and helped them earn conference runners-up honors. They also earned a spot in the NCAA Division II Tournament, where they were knocked out in the first round for the third time in four years. In 30 games, he madd 16 starts and averaged 11.3 points, 4.1 rebounds and 1.7 assists in 32.0 minutes per game.

Lewis finished his 121-game career with 1,051 points, 173 three-pointer, 369 rebounds and 128 assists. As a junior and senior, he earned All-SIAC Academic Team honors, while also earning NABC Academic Honor Roll honors as a senior.

== Professional career ==
After graduating from college, Lewis played for the Decatur Court Kings of the World Basketball Association (WBA), leading the team to the semi-finals while averaging over 20 points per game. He subsequently earned All-WBA First Team honors and was named the 2009 WBA Rookie of the Year.

In September 2009, Lewis signed with the Melbourne Tigers as a development player for the 2009–10 NBL season. He received limited opportunities, averaging 1.4 points in 13 games.

Lewis joined the Melbourne Tigers Big V team for the 2010 Big V season. In 20 games, he averaged 20.9 points, 7.0 rebounds, 1.9 assists, 1.2 steals and 1.1 blocks per game.

On 8 April 2010, Lewis signed with the Melbourne Tigers on a full-time contract. He appeared in all 28 games for the Tigers in 2010–11, averaging 4.3 points and 1.2 rebounds per game.

With the Tigers Big V team in 2011, Lewis averaged 17.2 points, 7.0 rebounds, 1.7 assists, 1.3 steals and 1.3 blocks in 18 games.

In the 2011–12 NBL season, Lewis averaged 3.1 points in 26 games for the Tigers.

Lewis joined the Waverley Falcons for the 2012 Big V season. He averaged 16.0 points, 6.5 rebounds, 2.1 assists, 1.2 steals and 2.1 blocks in 20 games.

In December of the 2012–13 NBL season, Lewis won the All-Star Slam Dunk Competition. In 27 games for the Tigers, he averaged 3.7 points and 1.0 rebounds per game.

Lewis joined the Perth Redbacks of the State Basketball League (SBL) for the 2013 season. In 25 games, he averaged 22.9 points, 6.4 rebounds, 4.1 assists and 1.2 steals per game.

On 5 December 2013, Lewis was acquired by the Fort Wayne Mad Ants of the NBA Development League. On 17 February 2014, he was waived by the Mad Ants. In 11 games, he averaged 7.4 points, 1.5 rebounds and 1.4 assists per game.

Lewis joined the Geraldton Buccaneers for the 2014 State Basketball League season. The Buccaneers reached the SBL Grand Final, where they lost 99–83 to the East Perth Eagles despite 20 points from Lewis. He appeared in all 31 games for the Buccaneers, averaging 26.0 points, 4.7 rebounds and 2.9 assists per game.

Lewis re-joined the Fort Wayne Mad Ants for the 2014–15 NBA Development League season, but was waived on 28 November after three games.

Lewis re-joined the Geraldton Buccaneers for the 2015 State Basketball League season. In 28 games, he averaged 29.3 points, 5.7 rebounds and 4.0 assists per game. He was subsequently named to the SBL All-Star Five.

On 8 May 2015, Lewis signed with the Plymouth Raiders for the 2015–16 British Basketball League season. He played for the Raiders on 19 September and 27 September. After a tryout with the Fort Wayne Mad Ants in mid October, he played a third and final game for Plymouth on 30 October. He joined the Mad Ants for the start of training camp on 2 November but was then waived on 11 November prior to the start of the regular season.

Lewis joined the Frankston Blues of the South East Australian Basketball League (SEABL) for the 2016 season. On 10 July, he scored 35 points in a 108–97 loss to the Ballarat Miners. In 24 games, he averaged 19.9 points, 4.7 rebounds and 2.9 assists per game.

On 7 October 2016, Lewis joined Melbourne United as a short-term injury replacement for David Barlow. On 12 January 2017, he was elevated to the active roster following a number of injuries to key players. He played in three games for United during the 2016–17 NBL season.

Lewis re-joined the Frankston Blues for the 2017 SEABL season. In 24 games, he averaged 15.6 points, 4.4 rebounds and 3.4 assists per game.

Lewis played a third season for Frankston in 2018 and averaged 18.9 points, 7.1 rebounds and 2.9 assists in 18 games.

Lewis joined the Waverley Falcons of the NBL1 for the 2019 season, returning to the team for a second stint. In 20 games, he averaged 15.2 points, 5.0 rebounds, 3.5 assists and 1.6 steals per game.

After a cancelled 2020 NBL1 season, Lewis re-joined the Falcons in the NBL1 South for the 2021 NBL1 season and continued on long term. He averaged 15.45 points per game in 2021; 10.82 points per game in 2022; 7.43 points per game in 2023; and 7.36 points per game in 2024.

In 21 games for the Falcons during the 2025 NBL1 season, Lewis averaged 9.1 points, 3.8 rebounds, 2.0 assists and 1.4 steals per game.

Lewis returned to the Falcons for the 2026 NBL1 season.

== Personal life ==
Lewis' father, Bennie Jr., played 10 seasons in the NBL between 1981 and 1990. Lewis is the grandson of Illinois Hall of Fame basketball coach Bennie Lewis Sr.
