= Shawn Redhage =

American-Australian basketball player (born 1981)

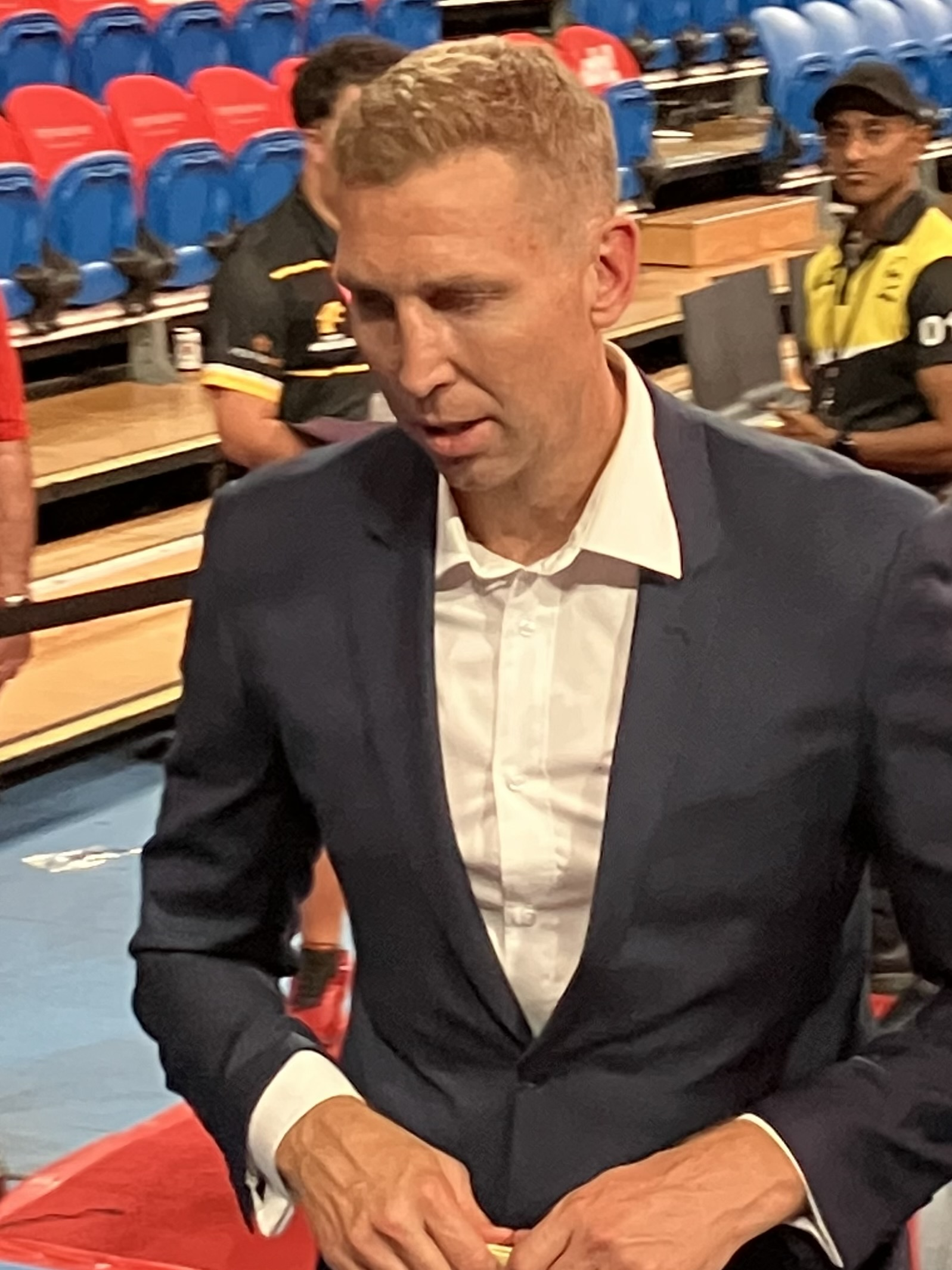
- Redhage in January 2023

Personal information
- Born: 21 January 1981 (age 45) Jacksonville, Florida
- Listed height: 203 cm (6 ft 8 in)
- Listed weight: 103 kg (227 lb)

Career information
- High school: Lincoln East (Lincoln, Nebraska)
- College: Arizona State (1999–2003)
- NBA draft: 2003: undrafted
- Playing career: 2004–2019
- Position: Power forward

Career history
- 2004: NW Tasmania Thunder
- 2004: New Zealand Breakers
- 2005: Bendigo Braves
- 2005–2017: Perth Wildcats
- 2008: Criollos de Caguas
- 2009–2010: Piratas de Quebradillas
- 2013: Piratas de Quebradillas
- 2014: Capitanes de Arecibo
- 2017–2018: Perth Redbacks
- 2019: Perry Lakes Hawks

Career highlights
- 4× NBL champion (2010, 2014, 2016, 2017); 2× All-NBL First Team (2008, 2010); 3× All-NBL Second Team (2006, 2007, 2009); 2× All-NBL Third Team (2011, 2013); BSN champion (2013); SBL champion (2017); SBL All-Star Five (2017); 2× SBL All-Star (2017, 2018); SBL scoring champion (2017); ABA champion (2005); 2× ABA Finals All-Star Five (2004, 2005); 2× SEABL South champion (2004, 2005); 2× SEABL South MVP (2004, 2005); No. 42 retired by Perth Wildcats

Shawn Michael Redhage (born 21 January 1981) is an American-Australian former professional basketball player who played 13 seasons in the National Basketball League (NBL). He played four years of college basketball for the Arizona State Sun Devils before moving to Australia in 2004 to play professionally. After spending time in the South East Australian Basketball League (SEABL) and with the New Zealand Breakers, Redhage joined the Perth Wildcats in 2005 and went on to played 12 seasons for the team.

With the Wildcats, Redhage won four NBL championships (2010, 2014, 2016, 2017) while featuring in seven All-NBL teams (2006–2011, 2013) and winning Club MVP six times. He also captained the team from 2009 to 2013. Known as "The Scoring Machine", Redhage spent his early years in the NBL as a force on the interior before becoming known for his knockdown ability from deep as his career progressed.

== High school career ==
Redhage was born in Jacksonville, Florida. He attended Lincoln East High School in Lincoln, Nebraska, where he played for the school's basketball team in each of his four years. He averaged 22.1 points and nine rebounds in 1997–98 and 21.0 points and 9.4 rebounds in 1998–99. He led the team to a 19–3 record in senior season (1998–99) and was subsequently named Nebraska Player of the Year (honorary captain) and Class A first-team all-state by the Omaha World-Herald. He ended his career as the school's career leader for rebounds (554), assists (315) and blocks (235), while finishing second in points with 1,206. He also became the second Lincoln East player (after Alex Stivrins in 1979–80) to make the Omaha World-Herald All-Nebraska first-team as a junior and senior.

Redhage was also an accomplished prep soccer player, as he led his team to the state championship and was a three-year letterwinner.

== College career ==
Redhage moved to Arizona State for college, where he joined the Sun Devils for the 1999–2000 season. As a freshman, he posted double-digits 14 times and matched the ASU freshman record with 28 starts. On 20 November 1999, he had a season-best 17 points against Texas en route to Puerto Rico Shootout All-Tournament honors. In 32 games, he averaged 8.3 points, 3.7 rebounds and 2.0 assists per game.

As a sophomore in 2000–01, Redhage established himself as one of the top student-athletes at Arizona State and in the Pac-10 as he earned Pac-10 All-Academic selection. In the Sun Devils' season opener, Redhage scored 19 points against Tulsa. On 30 December 2000, he had a season-best game with 19 points and 12 rebounds against Charlotte. He appeared in 29 games for the Sun Devils while making 24 starts, and averaged 8.1 points, 4.2 rebounds and 2.1 assists per game.

As a junior in 2001–02, Redhage was a Pac-10 All-Academic pick for the second straight year. On 2 February 2002, he had a season-high 13 points against California. Redhage came off the bench in all 29 games he played in 2001–02, averaging career-low numbers of 5.2 points, 2.6 rebounds and 1.2 assists per game.

As a senior in 2002–03, Redhage was a Pac-10 All-Academic pick for the third straight year. On 8 February 2003, he had a career-best performance off the bench against Washington. He had a career-high 29 points on 8-of-11 from the floor, had career highs in free throws made (11) and attempted (18), and posted season highs in rebounds (eight), assists (five) and minutes (34) in ASU's 79–77 overtime win. His 29 points marked the most by a Sun Devil off the bench in school history. Five days later against USC, he had 16 points and a career-high-tying 12 rebounds for the second double-double of his career. Redhage finished the season with 13 double-figure scoring games and earned 2003 Verizon Academic All-District VIII honors. In 32 games (seven starts), he averaged 8.3 points, 3.8 rebounds and 1.8 assists per game.

Redhage concluded his college career with a 3.61 grade point average, and in December 2007, he finished his B.S. in construction (general building construction) and graduated magna cum laude.

== Professional career ==
=== SEABL and New Zealand Breakers (2004–2005) ===
In 2004, Redhage moved to Australia to play for the NW Tasmania Thunder in the South East Australian Basketball League (SEABL). He won four player of the week awards on his way to claiming league MVP. He helped the Thunder win the SEABL South Conference championship before reaching the ABA National Final, where they were defeated 104–100 by the Cairns Marlins. In his rookie season, he averaged 35 points and 15 rebounds per game.

Redhage signed with the New Zealand Breakers of the National Basketball League (NBL) for the 2004–05 season. He made an impressive start to the season and was one of the Breakers' stand-out performers in the early clashes. A slump in form led to limited court time in late November and he was eventually released on 6 December 2004. In 13 games for the Breakers, he averaged 12.2 points, 4.6 rebounds and 1.4 assists per game.

Redhage returned to the SEABL for the 2005 season, this time playing for the Bendigo Braves. He helped the Braves win the SEABL South title, where he was named MVP of the conference grand final for his 43 points and 13 rebounds. He was also named SEABL South most valuable player for the second straight year. In the ABA National Final, he helped the Braves win the ABA National championship with a 102–98 win over the Sydney Comets.

=== Perth Wildcats (2005–2017) ===
==== Birth of "The Scoring Machine" (2005–2009) ====
Redhage joined the Perth Wildcats for the 2005–06 NBL season. He scored 27 points on debut against the Adelaide 36ers on 2 September 2005. He later earned Player of the Week for Round 9. He averaged 20 points and nine rebounds per game for the season and subsequently finished second in the league's MVP voting while earning All-NBL Second Team honours.

In November of the 2006–07 season, Redhage became the first player in NBL history to have at least 30 points and 15 assists as part of a triple-double when he added 11 rebounds against the West Sydney Razorbacks. Days later, he had 20 points and 20 rebounds against the Sydney Kings to win Player of the Week honours.

In the 2007–08 season, Redhage averaged a career-best 22.9 points per game and became the fastest Wildcat to reach 2,000 career points, doing so in 95 games and 3,400 minutes. On 10 October 2007, he scored a career-high 40 points against the Adelaide 36ers.

Redhage averaged at least 19 points and eight rebounds per game every year between 2005–06 and 2008–09 and subsequently earned a place in the All-NBL Team in four straight seasons. He was also a four-time Gordon Ellis Medalist during this time for being the Wildcats Club MVP. Spending his early years in the NBL as a force on the interior with a scoring prowess, Redhage earned the nickname "The Scoring Machine".

==== First NBL championship (2009–10) ====
Redhage was appointed captain of the Wildcats ahead of the 2009–10 season and went on to lead the team to the NBL championship with a 2–1 grand final series win over the Wollongong Hawks. He was named Club MVP for a fifth straight year and was named to the All-NBL First Team. He averaged 15.1 points per game in the new 40-minute era.

==== Career-threatening injury (2010–11) ====
In April 2010, Redhage re-signed with the Wildcats on a three-year deal. His 2010–11 season came to an end on 23 January 2011 after dislocating his left hip during the Wildcats' 77–76 loss to the Adelaide 36ers in Adelaide. It was originally feared that it could be a career-ending injury with there being a real possibility at the time of him requiring a hip replacement. The injury occurred after Redhage lunged for a contested ball in a way that punched the head of his femur through his pelvis, breaking the bone and dislocating the joint.

The Wildcats lost four consecutive games following Redhage's injury, winning only two from the remaining eight matches. Despite missing the second half of the season, Redhage shared Club MVP honours with Kevin Lisch.

==== Return to action and grand final (2011–12) ====
Redhage returned to the Wildcats' line-up for the start of the 2011–12 season, as he played in their season opener against the 36ers in Adelaide on 8 October 2011. In the arena where his injury occurred nine months earlier, Redhage scored a game-high 26 points to lead the Wildcats to a 102–69 win. He earned Player of the Week honours for Round 2 after recording 21 points, seven rebounds and four assists in a 92–76 win over the Melbourne Tigers. Redhage concluded the season by earning Player of the Week honours for Round 25 after scoring 19 points in a 72–71 road win over Melbourne. The Wildcats reached the 2012 NBL Grand Final series, where they lost 2–1 to the New Zealand Breakers. Redhage forced the series to a third and deciding game with a final-second block on Breakers guard C. J. Bruton in game two.

==== Another grand final appearance (2012–13) ====
After being named MVP of the NBL's preseason competition, Redhage went on to represent the South All-Stars in the NBL All-Star Game held in Adelaide on 22 December 2012. He helped the Wildcats return to the NBL Grand Final in 2012–13, where they lost 2–0 to the New Zealand Breakers.

During the season, Redhage was named in the Perth Wildcats 30th Anniversary All-Star team.

==== Second NBL championship (2013–14) ====
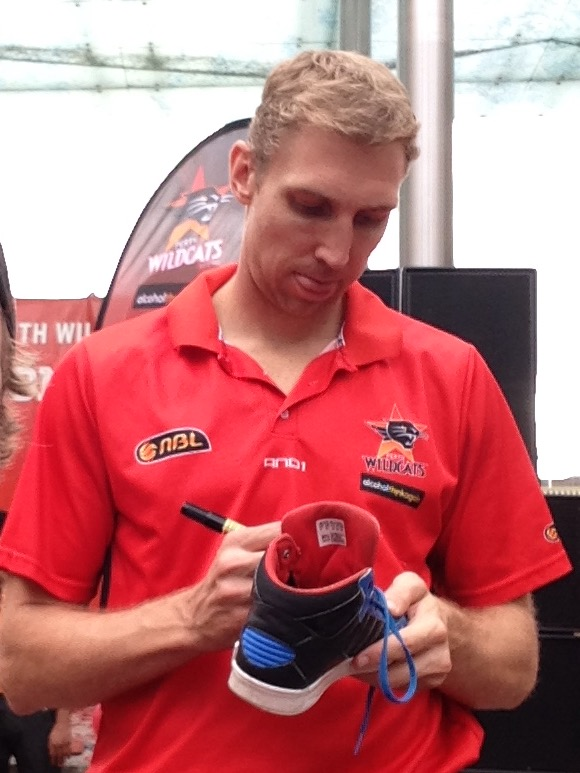
Redhage in April 2014 at the Wildcats' championship ceremony

On 7 May 2013, Redhage re-signed with the Wildcats on a three-year deal. For the 2013–14 season, he relinquished the captaincy to Damian Martin. He helped the Wildcats reach their third straight grand final series and fourth since 2010. There they defeated the Adelaide 36ers 2–1 to win the championship. Redhage played 34 minutes in game three and scored a team-high 16 points in claiming his second NBL title.

==== Entering the record books (2014–15) ====
In the 2014–15 season, Redhage played his 300th NBL game and 300th Wildcats game. He became just the sixth player to play 300 games for the Wildcats, joining Ricky Grace (482), James Crawford (371), Andrew Vlahov (349), Eric Watterson (306) and Mike Ellis (302).

Redhage missed the Wildcats' 2015 finals campaign with a stress fracture in his right foot. He appeared in all 28 regular-season games and averaged a career-low 11.4 points per game.

==== Third NBL championship (2015–16) ====
For the 2015–16 season, Redhage moved to a bench role following the addition of centre Nathan Jawai. Redhage embraced the role change and helped steady a first-class second unit. In January 2016, he played his 350th NBL game. The Wildcats reached the finals for a 30th straight season and went on to defeat the New Zealand Breakers 2–1 in the grand final series to claim championship victory, with Redhage winning his third title.

==== Final season and fourth championship (2016–17) ====
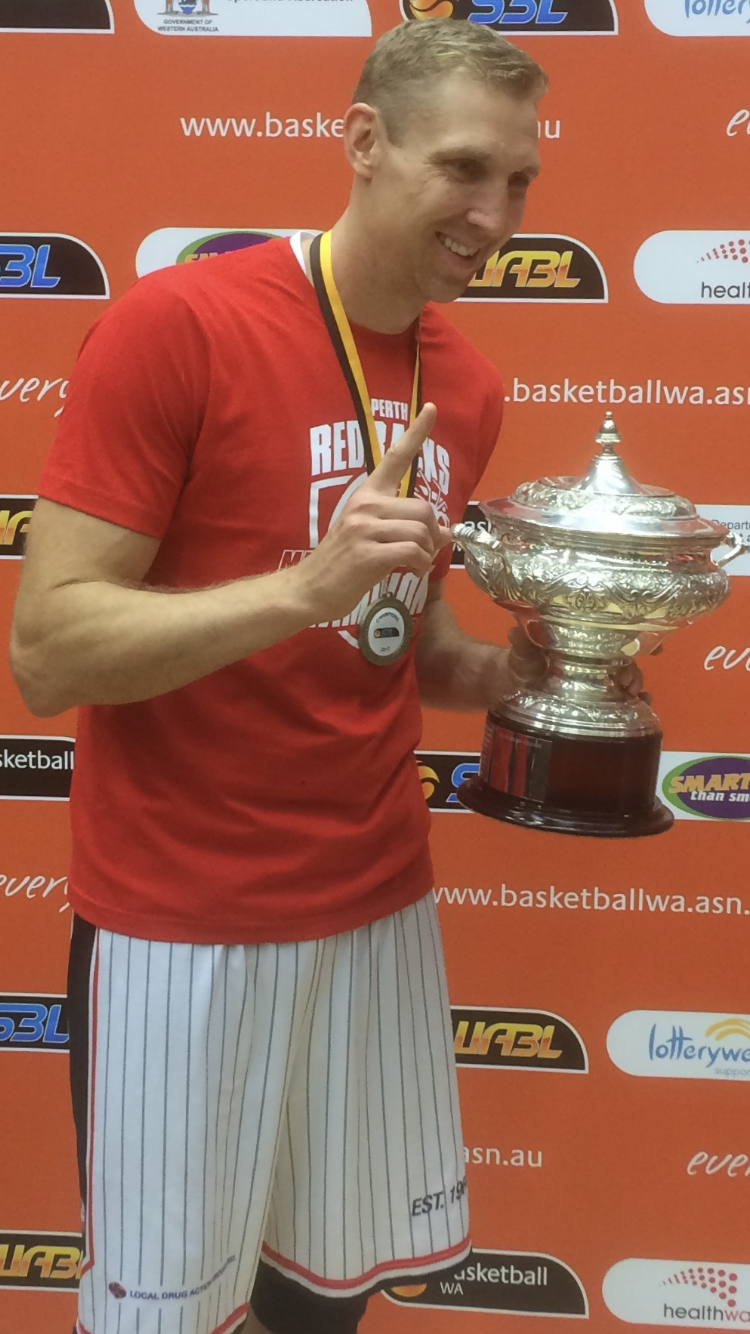
Redhage in September 2017 after winning the SBL championship with the Perth Redbacks

On 16 August 2016, Redhage re-signed with the Wildcats for the 2016–17 NBL season. Two months later, he played his 350th game for the Wildcats, becoming just the third Wildcat to reach the 350-game mark, joining James Crawford (371) and Ricky Grace (482). On 30 January 2017, he announced that the 2016–17 season would be his last in the NBL. Four days later, he made his 372nd appearance for the Wildcats to move into second spot on the team's all-time games played list. On 10 February, he tied his season high with 11 points to help the Wildcats defeat the Sydney Kings 101–74; nine of his points came in the last five minutes of the game.

The Wildcats reached the NBL Grand Final series for the sixth time in eight years, where they defeated the Illawarra Hawks 3–0 in the best-of-five series to claim back-to-back NBL championships, with Redhage winning his fourth title. He finished his career with 393 NBL games and 380 Wildcats games while finishing with 5,819 points and 2,153 rebounds.

In February 2022, Redhage was named in the Wildcats' 40th Anniversary Team. On 20 January 2023, the Wildcats retired Redhage's number 42 jersey.

=== Puerto Rico and SBL ===
During his time with the Wildcats, Redhage spent numerous offseasons in Puerto Rico playing for Criollos de Caguas (2008), Piratas de Quebradillas (2009, 2010 and 2013) and Capitanes de Arecibo (2014). In 2013, he and former Wildcats teammate Kevin Lisch helped Piratas de Quebradillas win the BSN championship.

After retiring from the NBL, Redhage played three seasons in the State Basketball League (SBL). In his first season in 2017, he led the league in scoring and helped the Perth Redbacks win the SBL championship. He played a second season with the Redbacks in 2018 and then played for the Perry Lakes Hawks in 2019. He was set to play for the Hawks again in 2020 but was ruled out of the West Coast Classic due to a knee injury.

== National team career ==
Redhage was naturalised and became an Australian citizen on 12 January 2008. He subsequently played for Australia at the 2008 Beijing Olympics.

== Personal life ==
Redhage and his wife, Gretchen, have two children.

Redhage is tertiary qualified in construction engineering and spent time during the 2010s working for a financial planning firm called Savanna Pride in Subiaco, Perth.

After retiring from the NBL, Redhage started his business Redhage Basketball, which revolves around coaching junior players.
