= 2010–11 New Zealand Breakers season =

- Head coach: Andrej Lemanis
- Arena: North Shore Events Centre

NBL results
- Record: 22–6 (78.6%)
- Ladder: 1st
- Finals finish: Champions
- Stats at NBL.com.au

The 2010–11 NBL season was the 8th season for the New Zealand Breakers in the NBL. In this season, the Breakers won their first NBL championship title, becoming the first New Zealand first-grade team in any sport to win an Australian-based sporting championship.

== Off-season ==
=== Additions ===
Player	Signed	Former Team
Mika Vukona	Signed in April	Gold Coast Blaze
Gary Wilkinson	Signed 19 August	Utah State University

=== Subtractions ===
Player	Reason Left	New Team
Oscar Forman	Contract not re-newed.	Wollongong Hawks
Tony Ronaldson	Retired	N/A
Rick Rickert	Released	Free Agent

New Zealand also re-signed Kevin Braswell for the season.

== Roster ==
=== Depth chart ===
Pos.	Starting 5	Bench 1	Bench 2
C	Gary Wilkinson	Alex Pledger
PF	Mika Vukona	B. J. Anthony
SF	Thomas Abercrombie	Dillon Boucher	Leon Henry
SG	Kirk Penney	C. J. Bruton	Corey Webster
PG	Paul Henare	Kevin Braswell	Josh Bloxham

== Regular season ==
=== Standings ===
Pos	2010–11 NBL season											
Pos	Team	Pld	W	L	PCT	Last 5	Streak	Home	Away	PF	PA	PP
1	New Zealand Breakers	28	22	6	78.57%	4–1	W3	12–2	10–4	2463	2367	104.06%
2	Townsville Crocodiles	28	17	11	60.71%	3–2	L1	13–1	4–10	2225	2163	102.87%
3	Cairns Taipans^{1}	28	16	12	57.14%	4–1	W4	12–2	4–10	2186	2107	103.75%
4	Perth Wildcats^{1}	28	16	12	57.14%	3–2	L2	10–4	6–8	2380	2192	108.58%
5	Wollongong Hawks	28	15	13	53.57%	4–1	W1	10–4	5–9	2272	2209	102.85%
6	Gold Coast Blaze	28	13	15	46.43%	2–3	W1	8–6	5–9	2396	2440	98.20%
7	Melbourne Tigers	28	10	18	35.71%	1–4	L3	5–9	5–9	2209	2357	93.72%
8	Adelaide 36ers	28	9	19	32.14%	1–4	L1	7–7	2–12	2212	2362	93.65%
9	Sydney Kings	28	8	20	28.57%	2–3	L3	5–9	3–11	2171	2317	93.70%

Updated to match(es) played on 2 April 2011. Source: NBL.com.au

== Game log ==
2010–11 game log
Pre-season: 1–0 (Home: 1–0; Road: 0–0)

Game	Date	Team	Score	High points	High rebounds	High assists	Location Attendance	Record
1	10 October	NZNBL Invitational	W 98–53				North Shore Events Centre	1–0

October: 3–0 (Home: 2–0; Road: 1–0)

Game	Date	Team	Score	High points	High rebounds	High assists	Location Attendance	Record
1	16 October	@ Sydney	W 83–70				Sydney Entertainment Centre; 8,533	1–0
2	20 October	Perth	W 96–94				North Shore Events Centre; 2,280	2–0
3	28 October	Melbourne	W 84–79				North Shore Events Centre; 2,428	3–0

November: 3–2 (Home: 1–1; Road: 2–1)

Game	Date	Team	Score	High points	High rebounds	High assists	Location Attendance	Record
4	6 November	@ Gold Coast	W 96–81				Gold Coast Convention Centre; 3,871	4–0
5	12 November	@ Adelaide	W 82–78				Adelaide Arena; 5,430	5–0
6	14 November	@ Perth	L 74–114				Challenge Stadium; 4,200	5–1
7	19 November	Wollongong	L 57–73				North Shore Events Centre; 3,800	5–2
8	25 November	Gold Coast	W 100–97				North Shore Events Centre; 2,800	6–2

December: 4–1 (Home: 1–0; Road: 3–1)

Game	Date	Team	Score	High points	High rebounds	High assists	Location Attendance	Record
9	5 December	@ Sydney Kings	W 94–80				Sydney Entertainment Centre; 4,327	7–2
10	9 December	Cairns	W 93–79				North Shore Events Centre; 3,600	8–2
11	17 December	@ Wollongong	W 89–85				WIN Entertainment Centre; 3,367	9–2
12	18 December	@ Melbourne	W 90–80				State Netball and Hockey Centre; 3,356	10–2
13	31 December	@ Townsville	L 79–96				Townsville Entertainment Centre; 4,610	10–3

January: 4–0 (Home: 2–0; Road: 2–0)

Game	Date	Team	Score	High points	High rebounds	High assists	Location Attendance	Record
14	8 January	@ Adelaide 36ers	W 90–85				Adelaide Arena; 5,261	11–3
15	13 January	Cairns Taipans	W 94–88				North Shore Events Centre; 4,148	12–3
16	20 January	Adelaide 36ers	W 91–77				North Shore Events Centre; TBA	13–3
17	30 January	@Cairns Taipans	W 77–74				Cairns Convention Centre; 5,019	14–3

February: 4–2 (Home: 3–1; Road: 1–1)

Game	Date	Team	Score	High points	High rebounds	High assists	Location Attendance	Record
18	3 February	Wollongong Hawks	W 80–76				North Shore Events Centre; TBA	15–3
19	11 February	Melbourne Tigers	W 101–91				North Shore Events Centre; TBA	16–3
20	17 February	Perth Wildcats	W 82–79				North Shore Events Centre; 2,634	17–3
21	20 February	@Gold Coast Blaze	W 123–115				Gold Coast Convention Centre; TBA	18–3
22	24 February	Gold Coast Blaze	L 91–94				North Shore Events Centre; TBA	18–4
23	27 February	@Wollongong Hawks	L 81–104				WIN Entertainment Centre; 3,112	18–5

March: 3–1 (Home: 3–0; Road: 0–1)

Game	Date	Team	Score	High points	High rebounds	High assists	Location Attendance	Record
24	3 March	Townsville Crocodiles	W 66–65				North Shore Events Centre; TBA	19–5
25	12 March	@Townsville Crocodiles	L 92–100				Townsville Entertainment Centre; 4,086	19–6
26	17 March	Sydney Kings	W 91–86				North Shore Events Centre; TBA	20–6
27	30 March	Adelaide 36ers	W 100–71				North Shore Events Centre; 3,500	21–6

April: 1–0 (Home: 0–0; Road: 1–0)

Game	Date	Team	Score	High points	High rebounds	High assists	Location Attendance	Record
28	2 April	@Melbourne Tigers	W 87–74				State Netball and Hockey Centre; 3,450	22–6

=== Semi-finals ===
2010–11 game log
Semi-Finals: 2–1 (Home: 1–1; Road: 1–0)

Game	Date	Team	Score	High points	High rebounds	High assists	Location Attendance	Record
1	7 April	Perth Wildcats	L 78–101				North Shore Events Centre; 4,000	0–1
2	10 April	@Perth Wildcats	W 93–89				Challenge Stadium; 4,400	1-1
3	13 April	Perth Wildcats	W 99–83				North Shore Events Centre; 4,148	2–1

=== Grand Finals ===
2010–11 game log
Grand Finals: 2–1 (Home: 2–0; Road: 0–1)

Game	Date	Team	Score	High points	High rebounds	High assists	Location Attendance	Record
1	20 April	Cairns Taipans	W 85–67				North Shore Events Centre; 4,400	1–0
2	24 April	@Cairns Taipans	L 81–85				Cairns Convention Centre; 5,200	1-1
3	29 April	Cairns Taipans	W 71–53				North Shore Events Centre; 4,400	2–1

== Awards ==
=== Player of the Week ===
- Week 4 – Gary Wilkinson
- Week 9 – Kirk Penney
- Week 10 – Kirk Penney
- Week 14 – Kirk Penney
- Week 19 – Kirk Penney
- Week 25 – Thomas Abercrombie

=== Player of the Month ===
- December – Kirk Penney
- January – Gary Wilkinson
- February – Kirk Penney

=== Coach of the Month ===
- January – Andrej Lemanis

=== All-NBL First Team ===
- Kirk Penney
- Gary Wilkinson

=== Most Valuable Player (Finals Series) ===
- Thomas Abercrombie

== See also ==
2010–11 NBL season
