= Schenscher =

Schenscher is a surname. Notable people with the surname include:

- Luke Schenscher (born 1982), Australian basketball player
- Peter Schenscher (born 1962), Australian cricketer
