= Julian Khazzouh =

Lebanese-Australian basketball player

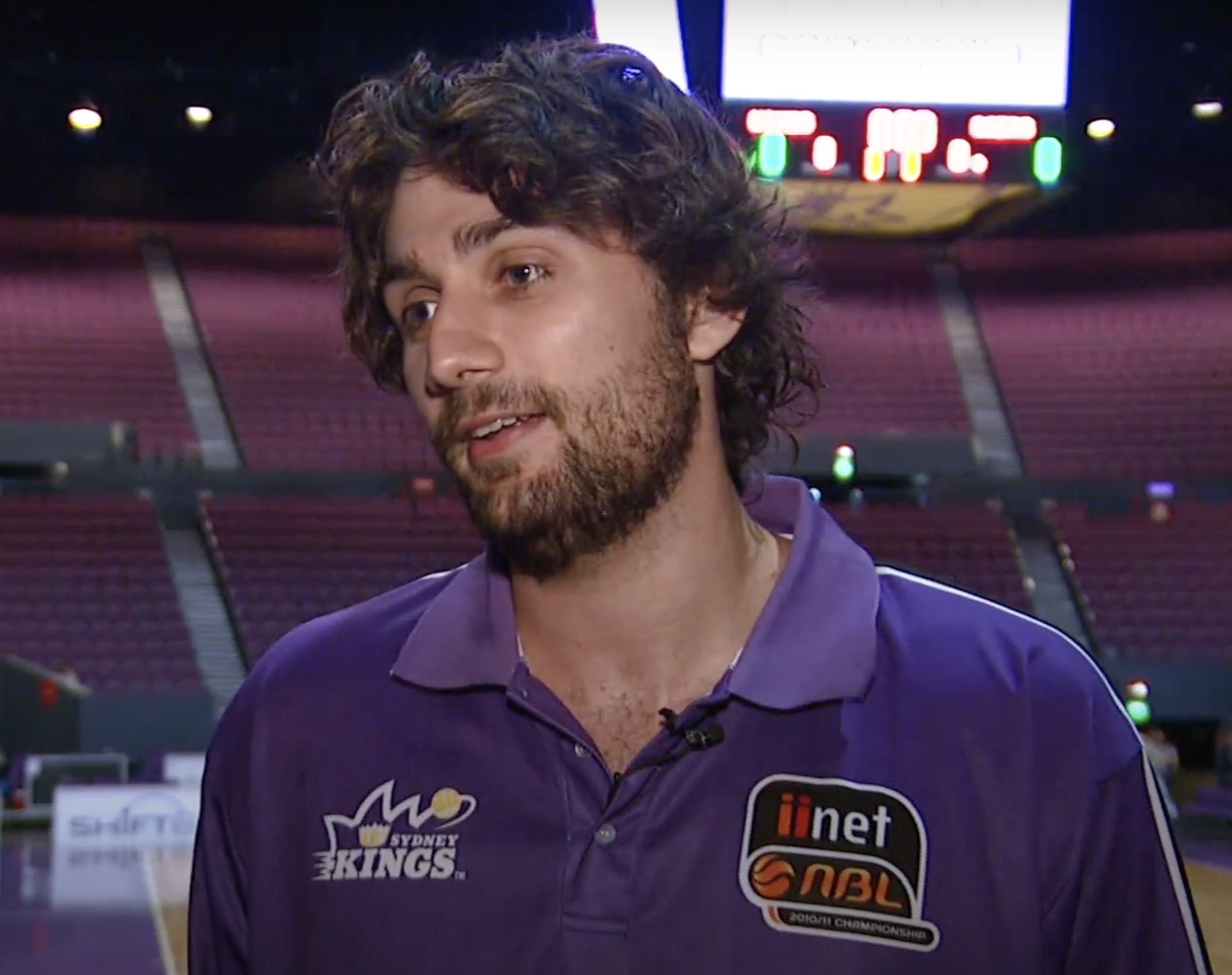
- Khazzouh with the Sydney Kings in 2011

Personal information
- Born: 23 February 1986 (age 40) Melbourne, Victoria
- Listed height: 209 cm (6 ft 10 in)
- Listed weight: 109 kg (240 lb)

Career information
- High school: Oakhill College (Sydney, New South Wales)
- NBA draft: 2008: undrafted
- Playing career: 2004–2017
- Position: Center / power forward

Career history
- 2004–2005: West Sydney Razorbacks
- 2006–2008: West Sydney Razorbacks / Sydney Spirit
- 2008–2009: Capitals Groningen
- 2009–2010: Ironi Ramat Gan
- 2010–2012: Sydney Kings
- 2012: Asseco Prokom Gdynia
- 2012–2015: Sagesse SC
- 2015–2017: Sydney Kings

Career highlights
- 2× All-NBL First Team (2011, 2012)

Julian Adel Khazzouh (born 23 February 1986) is a Lebanese-Australian former professional basketball player. He played in Australia, the Netherlands, Israel, and Lebanon.

== Early life and career ==
Born in Melbourne, Khazzouh moved to Sydney as a child and attended Oakhill College in the suburb of Castle Hill. He played rugby league as a youth before taking up basketball at age 13.

At age 18, Khazzouh was discovered by the NSW Institute of Sport after he earned a NSW Combined Independent Schools Sports Council major basketball award in 2004 while attending Oakhill College. Later that year, he signed with the West Sydney Razorbacks as a development player for the 2004–05 NBL season. He made his NBL debut and his lone appearance of the season on 10 October 2004 against the Brisbane Bullets. He missed his only field goal attempt and played just under two minutes of action.

== Professional career ==
=== Sydney and Holland ===
Khazzouh did not play in the NBL in 2005–06 after he was offered a position at Metro State College in Denver. He was poised to move to the United States in early 2006 but an offer from the Razorbacks convinced him to stay in Australia and he joined the team as a full-time player for the first time in 2006–07. Khazzouh also played for the Parramatta Wildcats of the Waratah League between 2005 and 2007.

After finishing second in the NBL Rookie of the Year voting behind Joe Ingles in 2007, Khazzouh had a very productive season for the Razorbacks in 2007–08 as he averaged 11.1 points and 6.2 rebounds in 28 games. The Razorbacks struggled in 2007–08 and subsequently changed their name to the Sydney Spirit for the 2008–09 NBL season. However, the change in name didn't bring a change in fortune for the club. Attendances at the State Sports Centre were poor with the game against the Cairns Taipans in Round 21 only drawing 920 fans. Khazzouh, along with Liam Rush (who left for Sweden), left the Spirit 14 games into the season, moving to Holland to play for Hanzevast Capitals Groningen in December 2008. He finished out the season with Groningen and averaged 11.5 points and 7.9 rebounds in 28 games.

=== Israel ===
On 28 July 2009, Khazzouh signed a one-year deal with Ironi Ramat Gan of the Israeli Basketball Super League. In 21 games for Ironi, he averaged 10.8 points and 6.3 rebounds per game.

=== Sydney Kings ===
After having their licence revoked by the NBL in 2008, the Sydney Kings returned to the league for the 2010–11 season and one of their first signings was Khazzouh. Despite the Kings' poor season, finishing with a win–loss record of 8–20, Khazzouh had a breakout season. He averaged 17.4 points, 10.0 rebounds and 1.8 blocks per game and was rewarded with being named in the All-NBL first team. Despite playing for the last place NBL club in 2010–11, Khazzouh was a hot favourite for the MVP award, though ultimately he finished second in the voting behind Wollongong's Gary Ervin.

Following the 2010–11 season, Khazzouh travelled to the United States for trials with NBA franchises. He returned to Sydney for the 2011–12 season and had another successful year as he won the NBL's Player of the Week award four times. The first in Round 1, followed by winning the award for rounds 3, 16 and 17.

In December 2011, halfway through the 2011–12 NBL season, Khazzouh was invited to the Golden State Warriors NBA pre-season camp. After attending Warriors training sessions all week, Khazzouh played the last 1:24 of the Warriors first pre-season game and scored two points against the Sacramento Kings in a 107–96 win. Khazzouh was one of four players waived by the Warriors on 18 December 2011. He again returned to Sydney where he played out the season.

=== Lebanon ===
After a stint with the Los Angeles Lakers summer league team in July 2012, Kazzouh joined Asseco Prokom Gdynia of Poland for the 2012–13 season. However, he lasted just two games before leaving the club and joining Lebanese powerhouse Sagesse in October. He played with the club for three seasons before leaving them in controversial circumstances in April 2015 on the eve of the playoffs.

=== Return to Sydney ===
On 11 June 2015, Khazzouh returned to the Sydney Kings, re-signing with the club for the 2015–16 NBL season. On 21 December 2015, he was ruled out for the rest of the season after scans revealed he required surgery to repair a ruptured right quadriceps tendon. In 17 games for the Kings, he averaged 13.8 points, 7.5 rebounds, 1.6 assists, 1.1 steals and 1.8 blocks per game.

Following the conclusion of the 2015–16 season, Khazzouh took up the option on his contract and re-signed with the Kings for the 2016–17 season. Due to the quad injury suffered in 2015–16, Khazzouh missed the entire 2016 pre-season. He hoped to return at some point during the 2016–17 season, but on 20 December 2016, he was ruled out for the entire season in order to continue recovering from his quadriceps tendon injury.

== National team career ==
Khazzouh was a squad member of the Australian national team in 2009, however did not participate in any farther matches for the national team.

In November 2014, Khazzouh was approached by the Lebanese Basketball Federation and asked to participate for the Lebanon national basketball team in the upcoming 2015 FIBA Asia Championship serving as a qualifier for the 2016 Olympic Games. Khazzouh, having not participated in any formal matches for Australia, was deemed eligible to participate as a local player for Lebanon as his father had originated from Lebanon. Later that month, the Lebanese Federation claimed that Khazzouh was considering the proposal.

== Off the court ==
Khazzouh featured in the 2005 film Star Wars: Episode III – Revenge of the Sith, playing a wookiee named Lachichuk.
