= Anthony Petrie =

Australian basketball player

Gold Coast Rollers
- Title: Head coach
- League: NBL1 North

Personal information
- Born: 3 June 1983 (age 43) Tenterfield, New South Wales
- Listed height: 203 cm (6 ft 8 in)
- Listed weight: 100 kg (220 lb)

Career information
- Playing career: 2003–2021
- Position: Power forward
- Coaching career: 2022–present

Career history

Playing
- 2003; 2005–2008: Canberra Gunners
- 2007–2008: West Sydney Razorbacks
- 2008–2009: Wollongong Hawks
- 2009–2012: Gold Coast Blaze
- 2010: Northside Wizards
- 2012: Brisbane Spartans
- 2012–2016: Adelaide 36ers
- 2013: North Adelaide Rockets
- 2016–2018: Brisbane Bullets
- 2019; 2021: Gold Coast Rollers

Coaching
- 2022–present: Gold Coast Rollers

Career highlights
- As player: NBL Most Improved Player (2010); All-NBL Second Team (2010); 2× SEABL East MVP (2006, 2007); 3× All-SEABL East Team (2005–2007); As coach: NBL1 National champion (2026); 2× NBL1 North champion (2022, 2026); NBL1 North Coach of the Year (2023)

Anthony Petrie (born 3 June 1983) is an Australian basketball coach and former professional basketball player. He played 11 seasons in the National Basketball League (NBL) between 2007 and 2018. He is currently the head coach of the Gold Coast Rollers in the NBL1 North.

== Early life ==
Petrie was born in Tenterfield, New South Wales. Alongside basketball, he grew up playing cricket, rugby league and athletics.

== Playing career ==
=== NBL ===
Petrie made his debut in the National Basketball League (NBL) for the West Sydney Razorbacks during the 2007–08 season. For the 2008–09 NBL season, he joined the Wollongong Hawks.

Between 2009 and 2012, Petrie played for the Gold Coast Blaze. For the 2009–10 season, he named the NBL's Most Improved Player and earned All-NBL Second Team honours after averaging 11.3 points and 6.6 rebounds per game. Three games into the 2010–11 season, he suffered a season-ending Achilles tendon rupture.

Between 2012 and 2016, Petrie played for the Adelaide 36ers. He helped the 36ers reach the 2014 NBL Grand Final series, where they lost 2–1 to the Perth Wildcats.

Between 2016 and 2018, Petrie played for the Brisbane Bullets. On 31 December 2016, he was ruled out of the rest of the 2016–17 NBL season with a left knee injury. He damaged the same knee again during the 2017–18 season and subsequently had one last knee operation in November 2017 to see him through the season. He retired from the NBL in February 2018.

=== State Leagues ===
Petrie debuted in the South East Australian Basketball League (SEABL) in 2003 with the Canberra Gunners, helping the team win the East Conference title. He played four more seasons with the Gunners between 2005 and 2008. In 2006 and 2007, he was the SEABL East MVP, and was a three-time All-SEABL East Team honouree.

In 2010, Petrie played for the Northside Wizards of the Queensland Basketball League (QBL). In 2012, he had a one-game stint in the SEABL with the Brisbane Spartans, and in 2013 he played for the North Adelaide Rockets in the Central ABL.

In 2019, Petrie played for the Gold Coast Rollers in the QBL. He returned to the Rollers in 2021, now playing in the rebranded NBL1 North.

=== National team ===
Petrie first played for Australia in the 2002 Oceania Under 22 Championships, leading the team in scoring. His first Australian Boomers call-up came just shy of his 30th birthday, with Petrie playing against China in the 2013 Sino-Australia Challenge. This led to selection in the Boomers team for the 2013 FIBA Oceania Championship.

== Coaching career ==
In December 2021, Petrie was appointed head coach of the Gold Coast Rollers for the 2022 NBL1 North season. He guided the team to the 2022 NBL1 North championship. He was named the NBL1 North Men's Coach of the Year for the 2023 season. He coached his fourth season as men's head coach in 2025 and his fifth in 2026. He guided the team to the 2026 NBL1 North championship. At the 2026 NBL1 National Finals, the Rollers reached the championship game, where they defeated the Forestville Eagles 70–67 in overtime to win the NBL1 National championship.

== Personal life ==
Petrie and his wife Sarah have four children. Sarah (née Berry) is a former Canberra Capitals championship player.

Petrie completed his Bachelor of Education degree at ACU's Canberra Campus.
