= Ayinde Ubaka =

American basketball player (born 1985)

Personal information
- Born: February 9, 1985 (age 41) San Francisco, California, U.S.
- Listed height: 6 ft 4 in (1.93 m)
- Listed weight: 205 lb (93 kg)

Career information
- High school: Oakland (Oakland, California)
- College: California (2003–2007)
- NBA draft: 2007: undrafted
- Playing career: 2007–2013
- Position: Point guard / shooting guard

Career history
- 2007: Czarni Słupsk
- 2007–2008: Skyliners Frankfurt
- 2008: Antwerp Giants
- 2008–2009: Anaheim Arsenal
- 2009: Phantoms Braunschweig
- 2009–2010: Gold Coast Blaze
- 2010–2011: Cairns Taipans
- 2011–2012: Melbourne Tigers
- 2012: Wollongong Hawks
- 2012–2013: BC Hoverla
- 2013: Melbourne Tigers

Career highlights
- All-NBL Third Team (2011); All-NBL Second Team (2010); First-team All-Pac-10 (2006); Fourth-team Parade All-American (2003)

Ayinde X. Ubaka (born February 9, 1985) is an American former professional basketball player. He played college basketball for the California Golden Bears and spent seven seasons playing professionally overseas.

== High school career ==
Ubaka attended Oakland High School in Oakland, California. As a junior, he averaged 23 points, 8 rebounds and 8 assists per game. As a senior, he averaged 23.5 points, 6.5 rebounds and 5.0 assists per game as he earned fourth-team Parade All-American honors, selected first team all-state by Cal-Hi Sports, first-team All-ANG Newspapers and league MVP, and chosen All-Metro by the San Francisco Chronicle.

Ubaka also played both quarterback and cornerback on the Oakland High football team his sophomore and senior years.

== College career ==
In his freshman season at California, Ubaka ranked third in the Pac-10 in assist-to-turnover ratio (1.96) and ninth in the league in assists to earn honorable mention Pac-10 All-Freshman honors. He also earned Cal's 2004 Most Unselfish Player Award. In 28 games (26 starts), he averaged 6.4 points, 2.1 rebounds and 3.9 assists per game.

In his sophomore season, Ubaka missed a portion of the year due to injury. On November 23, 2004, he broke the fifth metatarsal in his left foot which required surgery and two months on the sidelines. He returned to action on January 15, 2005. In 18 games (11 starts), he averaged 6.1 points, 2.0 rebounds and 2.7 assists per game.

In his junior season, Ubaka improved dramatically. He was named to the second team NABC all-district, as well as the all-tournament team at the Pac-10 Tournament. He was also the co-recipient of Cal's Most Improved Player Award. In 31 games (all starts), he averaged 14.5 points, 3.0 rebounds and 3.8 assists per game.

In his senior season, Ubaka had another solid year as he was named to the All-Pac-10 Honorable Mention team. In 33 games, he averaged 13.7 points, 3.0 rebounds and 4.7 assists per game.

== Professional career ==
After going undrafted in the 2007 NBA draft, Ubaka played for the Charlotte Bobcats in the NBA Summer League. He had a two-game stint in Poland with Czarni Słupsk in November 2007 before joining German team Skyliners Frankfurt on a two-month contract. He left Skyliners in January 2008 and signed with Belgian team Antwerp Giants for the rest of the season.

After playing for the Golden State Warriors in the 2008 NBA Summer League, Ubaka joined the Anaheim Arsenal of the NBA Development League in November 2008. He was waived by the Arsenal on January 2, 2009, after averaging 3.2 points in 12 games. On February 20, 2009, he signed with German team Phantoms Braunschweig for the rest of the season.

In August 2009, Ubaka signed with the Gold Coast Blaze in Australia for the 2009–10 NBL season. In 22 games, he averaged 16.3 points, 2.6 rebounds and 4.2 assists per game. He was named to the All-NBL Second Team.

On June 1, 2010, Ubaka signed with the Cairns Taipans for the 2010–11 NBL season. He helped the Taipans reach the NBL grand final series, where they lost 2–1 to the New Zealand Breakers. In 34 games, he averaged 13.9 points, 2.7 rebounds and 4.0 assists per game. He was named to the All-NBL Third Team

In May 2011, Ubaka signed with the Melbourne Tigers for the 2011–12 NBL season. He was released by the Tigers on January 16, 2012. A week later, he signed with the Wollongong Hawks for the rest of the season. His first game for the Hawks was against the Tigers, where he scored 15 points in a win.

On November 9, 2012, Ubaka signed with Ukraine team BC Hoverla. He left the team in January 2013 after averaging 8.1 points in 13 games.

On October 8, 2013, Ubaka signed with the Melbourne Tigers for the 2013–14 NBL season, returning to the club for a second stint. He was released by the Tigers on November 17, 2013, after averaging 5.3 points in seven games.
