= PBR World Cup =

The PBR World Cup was a team competition developed by the Professional Bull Riders (PBR) organization in 2007 in which bull riders from the five countries where PBR events were sanctioned competed for their share of a US$100,000 prize. Each team consisted of five riders from their respective countries, each with their own team captain (who was either a current or former rider).

The 25 riders competed in four rounds, two rounds each night, with all the contestants riding in each round, which meant fans could see 50 rides per night. The team captain could only select three scores for each round. Once all four rounds were complete, the team with the highest total score would be declared the winner.

During the first World Cup, the contestants rode with their regular attire that they normally competed in, but starting with the following World Cup, the teams rode with uniforms that represented their respective countries.

The first World Cup, held in 2007, took place at the Gold Coast Convention and Exhibition Centre in Gold Coast, Queensland, Australia.

The second World Cup was held in 2008 at the Manuel Bernardo Aguirre Gymnasium in Chihuahua City, Chihuahua, Mexico.

The third World Cup was held in 2009 at the Parque do Peão in Barretos, São Paulo, Brazil.

The fourth World Cup took place in the spring of 2010 at the Thomas & Mack Center in Las Vegas, Nevada, United States.

The PBR World Cup event has since been discontinued, and a different event, the PBR Global Cup, began in 2017 and was held through 2022 before being discontinued as well.

== Results ==
Year	Host	Champions	Runners-up	3rd place	4th place	5th place
2007	(Australia); Gold Coast	Brazil	Canada	United States	Mexico	Australia
2008	(Mexico); Chihuahua City	United States	Canada	Brazil	Mexico	Australia
2009	(Brazil); Barretos	United States	Brazil	Canada	Australia	Mexico
2010	(United States); Las Vegas	Brazil	United States	Australia	Canada	Mexico

== Medal table ==
Rank	Nation	Gold	Silver	Bronze	Total
1	Brazil (BRA)	2	1	1	4
1	United States (USA)	2	1	1	4
3	Canada (CAN)	0	2	1	3
4	Australia (AUS)	0	0	1	1
5	Mexico (MEX)	0	0	0	0
Totals (5 entries)		4	4	4	12

== Participation details ==
Team	(Australia); 2007	(Mexico); 2008	(Brazil); 2009	(United States); 2010	Total
Australia	5th	5th	4th	3rd	4
Brazil	1st	3rd	2nd	1st	4
Canada	2nd	2nd	3rd	4th	4
Mexico	4th	4th	5th	5th	4
United States	3rd	1st	1st	2nd	4

== See also ==
- PBR Global Cup
