= Luke Schenscher =

Australian basketball player (born 1982)

Personal information
- Born: 31 December 1982 (age 43) Hope Forest, South Australia, Australia
- Listed height: 216 cm (7 ft 1 in)
- Listed weight: 115 kg (254 lb)

Career information
- High school: Cardijn College (Adelaide, South Australia); Lake Ginninderra College (Canberra, ACT)
- College: Georgia Tech (2001–2005)
- NBA draft: 2005: undrafted
- Playing career: 2001–2017
- Position: Centre
- Number: 45, 24

Career history
- 1999–2001: Australian Institute of Sport
- 2005–2007: Fort Worth Flyers
- 2006: Chicago Bulls
- 2007: Portland Trail Blazers
- 2007: Brose Baskets
- 2008–2009: Adelaide 36ers
- 2009–2010: Perth Wildcats
- 2010–2012: Townsville Crocodiles
- 2012–2015: Adelaide 36ers
- 2015–2016: Townsville Crocodiles
- 2016: Townsville Heat
- 2017: Singapore Slingers
- 2017: Southern Tigers

Career highlights
- NBL champion (2010); 2× All-NBL Second Team (2009, 2011); NBA D-League All-Star (2007); All-NBA D-League Second Team (2006)
- Stats at NBA.com
- Stats at Basketball Reference

Luke Dean Schenscher (born 31 December 1982) is an Australian former professional basketball player. He played four years of college basketball for Georgia Tech before having stints in the National Basketball Association (NBA) with the Chicago Bulls in 2006 and the Portland Trail Blazers in 2007. In 2010, he won an NBL championship with the Perth Wildcats.

== Early life and career ==
Schenscher was born in the small South Australian suburb of Hope Forest, just east of the town of Willunga where he grew up on a five-acre farm. As a junior, he played basketball for the Noarlunga City Tigers. In 1999, he moved to Canberra to attend the Australian Institute of Sport in conjunction with Lake Ginninderra College. Between 1999 and 2001, he played for the AIS men's team in the South East Australian Basketball League. In 2001, he led the team in scoring (15.2 points per game) and rebounding (9.2 per game), while also averaging 1.65 blocks per game and shooting 54 percent from the floor. He was subsequently named AIS Junior Athlete of the Year. Also in 2001, he became the first high school student to play for the Boomers when he took part in the East Asian Games. Additionally, he was a member of the Australian national under-21 team which finished eighth at the FIBA Under-21 World Championship.

== College career ==
From 2001 to 2005, Schenscher played college basketball for Georgia Tech. As a freshman, he started five of first six games before being sidelined for 12 games with a broken foot. He led Tech in field goal percentage (.587) and averaged 4.8 points and 3.2 rebounds for the season. As a sophomore, he started 16 games and ranked third on the team in field goal percentage (.472) and second in blocked shots (25).

As a junior in 2003–04, Schenscher finished fourth in the ACC in blocks (1.4 bpg) and eighth in rebounds (6.6 rpg). He shot .565 from the floor. He was the team's second leading scorer in the NCAA tournament, averaging 10.8 points along with 7.0 rebounds and 1.0 blocks. He helped the Yellow Jackets reach the NCAA Final Four, where he recorded 19 points and 12 rebounds in the semifinal win over Oklahoma State, and nine points and 11 rebounds in the final against UConn, a game the Yellow Jackets lost 82–73.

As a senior in 2004–05, Schenscher averaged a career-best 10.1 points per game, to go with 7.3 rebounds and 1.75 blocks. He led the Yellow Jackets in field goal percentage (.539) but did not meet the minimum attempts to qualify for league leaders.

In 119 games at Georgia Tech, Schenscher averaged 7.3 points, 5.4 rebounds and 1.32 blocks per game.

== Professional career ==
=== NBA and D-League ===
After going undrafted in the 2005 NBA draft, Schenscher joined the Denver Nuggets' Summer League team. He later signed with the Nuggets on 15 August before being waived on 3 October. He was claimed off waivers by the Sacramento Kings two days later, before they too waived him on 26 October. He subsequently joined the Fort Worth Flyers of the NBA Development League, where he averaged 8.2 points, 6.1 rebounds, 1.42 blocks and 1.2 assists in 36 appearances with 34 starts during the 2005–06 season. He shot .530 from the floor and .607 from the free throw line.

On 5 March 2006, Schenscher signed a 10-day contract with the Chicago Bulls. He went on to sign a second 10-day contract on 15 March, and a rest-of-season contract on 25 March. In 20 games for the Bulls, he averaged 1.8 points and 1.5 rebounds in 7.5 minutes per game. After playing for the Bulls during Summer League and preseason, he was waived on 30 October 2006.

He returned to the Flyers for the 2006–07 D-League season. In 34 games (31 starts) for the Flyers, he averaged 9.6 points, 6.9 rebounds and 1.20 blocked shots, while shooting .512 from the floor. On 15 March 2007, he signed a 10-day contract with the Portland Trail Blazers. He went on to sign a second 10-day contract on 25 March, and a rest-of-season contract on 4 April. In 11 games for the Trail Blazers, he averaged 1.7 points and 2.3 rebounds in 10.7 minutes per game.

In July 2007, Schenscher played for the Minnesota Timberwolves' Summer League team.

=== Germany ===
On 27 July 2007, Schenscher signed a one-year deal with German team Brose Baskets. It was reportedly the highest fee ever paid by the club at the time. He found the pressure of the big contract and the expectation that came with being an NBA player overwhelming, with the pressure translating to injuries on the court. He played only one game before returning to Australia to have surgery on his knee.

=== NBL ===
==== Adelaide 36ers ====
In April 2008, Schenscher signed with the Adelaide 36ers for 2008–09 NBL season. On 25 October 2008, he recorded 33 points and 20 rebounds against the Perth Wildcats. On 6 December 2008, he recorded 17 points and 22 rebounds against the Melbourne Tigers. On 13 February 2009, he recorded 37 points and 15 rebounds against the Wollongong Hawks. In 31 games, he averaged 16.9 points, 10.8 rebounds, 1.5 assists and 1.4 blocks per game. He subsequently earned All-NBL Second Team honours.

The 36ers allowed Schenscher to part ways with them in the off-season in order to play with the Los Angeles Lakers in the NBA Summer League, but he aborted those plans due to a back injury.

==== Perth Wildcats ====
In September 2009, Schenscher signed with the Perth Wildcats for the 2009–10 NBL season. He scored a season-high 22 points twice in December, with a season-best 15 rebounds coming on 6 February against the Melbourne Tigers. In March 2010, he helped the Wildcats defeat the Wollongong Hawks 2–1 in the NBL Grand Final series to win the NBL championship. In 33 games, he averaged 10.0 points and 6.2 rebounds per game.

In April 2010, the Wildcats parted ways with Schenscher due to his wage demands being too high for the club to meet.

==== Townsville Crocodiles ====
Weeks after parting ways with the Wildcats, Schenscher signed with the Townsville Crocodiles. On 30 October 2010, he recorded 26 points and 10 rebounds against the Sydney Kings. On 23 December, he had 25 points and 10 rebounds against the Adelaide 36ers. He had another 25-point, 10-rebound effort on 21 January against the Wildcats. In game one of the Crocodiles' semi-final series against the Cairns Taipans, Schenscher recorded 15 points and a season-high 14 rebounds. The Crocodiles went on to lose the series 2–1. In 31 games during the 2010–11 season, he averaged 13.7 points, 6.8 rebounds, 1.4 assists and 1.1 blocks per game. He subsequently earned All-NBL Second Team honours and was named the Club MVP.

After considering a move back to Adelaide, Schenscher returned to the Crocodiles for the 2011–12 season. However, his season debut was delayed until December due to hip surgery. On 10 March 2012, he scored a season-high 25 points against the Gold Coast Blaze. In 24 games, he averaged 10.4 points, 5.3 rebounds and 2.2 assists per game.

==== Return to Adelaide ====
In May 2012, Schenscher signed a two-year deal (with the option of a third) with the Adelaide 36ers, returning to the club for a second stint. On 28 December 2012, he recorded 25 points and 16 rebounds against the New Zealand Breakers. He missed the final six games of the 36ers' season due a back injury. In 21 games, he averaged 9.0 points, 6.1 rebounds and 1.9 assists per game.

After undergoing off-season elbow surgery, Schenscher appeared in all 34 games for the 36ers in 2013–14. In the 36ers' regular-season finale on 23 March 2014, he scored a season-high 18 points against the Melbourne Tigers. He helped the 36ers reach the 2014 NBL Grand Final series, where they lost 2–1 to the Perth Wildcats. He finished the season averaging 6.8 points and 5.4 rebounds per game.

On 27 June 2014, Schenscher took up the player option on his contract for the 2014–15 season. On 31 December 2014, he scored a season-high 16 points against the Cairns Taipans. He appeared in all 30 games for the 36ers, averaging 6.9 points, 5.1 rebounds and 1.1 assists per game.

==== Return to Townsville ====
On 17 July 2015, Schenscher signed a three-year deal with the Townsville Crocodiles, returning to the club for a second stint. In late October, he ruptured a ligament in his left ankle. Ankle and back complaints restricted Schenscher's court time in 2015–16. In 13 games, he averaged 4.1 points and 3.2 rebounds per game.

Following the demise of the Crocodiles in 2016, Schenscher retired from the NBL.

=== Final years ===
On 2 June 2016, Schenscher signed with the Townsville Heat for the rest of the 2016 Queensland Basketball League season.

In February 2017, Schenscher had a two-game stint with the Singapore Slingers of the ASEAN Basketball League, in place of the injured Justin Howard.

In April 2017, Schenscher joined the Southern Tigers of the South Australian Premier League. In 13 games, he averaged 8.6 points per game.

In June 2017, Schenscher's Townsville 3x3 team won the Australian CLB 3x3 championship and competed in the Fiba 3x3 world tour qualifiers in Mongolia.

== Personal ==
Schenscher is a fan of Australian rules football and is a known supporter of the Glenelg Football Club who play in the South Australian National Football League.

Schenscher is skilled at playing the didgeridoo.

== Career stats ==
Legend
GP	Games played	GS	Games started	MPG	Minutes per game
FG%	Field goal percentage	3P%	3-point field goal percentage	FT%	Free throw percentage
RPG	Rebounds per game	APG	Assists per game	SPG	Steals per game
BPG	Blocks per game	PPG	Points per game	**Bold**	Career high

=== NBA ===
==== Regular season ====
Year	Team	GP	GS	MPG	FG%	3P%	FT%	RPG	APG	SPG	BPG	PPG
2005–06	Chicago	**20**	0	7.4	**.615**	.000	.308	1.5	**.4**	.1	.2	**1.8**
2006–07	Portland	11	0	**10.7**	.304	.000	**.714**	**2.3**	.1	**.2**	**.4**	1.7
**Career**		31	0	8.6	.469	.000	.450	1.7	.3	.1	.2	1.8

==== Playoffs ====
Year	Team	GP	GS	MPG	FG%	3P%	FT%	RPG	APG	SPG	BPG	PPG
2006	Chicago	3	0	5.7	1.000	–	.750	2.3	.0	.0	.0	2.3

=== NBL ===
†	Denotes season in which Schenscher won an NBL Championship

Year	Team	GP	GS	MPG	FG%	3P%	FT%	RPG	APG	SPG	BPG	PPG
2008–09	Adelaide 36ers	31	31	**32.5**	**.549**	.000	**.746**	**10.8**	1.5	.3	**1.3**	**16.9**
2009–10†	Perth Wildcats	33	**33**	23.0	.520	.143	.621	6.2	1.0	.3	1.1	10.0
2010–11	Townsville Crocodiles	31	31	24.7	.529	.000	.734	6.8	1.4	.3	1.1	13.7
2011–12	Townsville Crocodiles	24	NA	23.8	.477	.000	.703	5.3	**2.2**	.4	.7	10.4
2012–13	Adelaide 36ers	21	NA	22.8	.453	.000	.613	6.1	1.9	**.8**	.9	9.0
2013–14	Adelaide 36ers	**34**	NA	15.8	.526	.500	.595	5.4	.8	.2	.6	6.8
2014–15	Adelaide 36ers	30	NA	17.6	.486	**1.000**	.408	5.1	1.1	.3	.8	6.9
2015–16	Townsville Crocodiles	13	0	13.4	.439	.000	.616	3.1	.3	.2	.5	4.1
