= Peter Crawford (basketball) =

Australian basketball player

Unemployed
- League: Unemployed

Personal information
- Born: 6 November 1979 (age 47) Mount Isa, Queensland, Australia
- Listed height: 193 cm (6 ft 4 in)
- Listed weight: 88 kg (194 lb)

Career information
- High school: Townsville State (Townsville, Queensland)
- Playing career: 1999–2019
- Coaching career: 2021–present

Career history

Playing
- 1999–2004: Townsville Crocodiles
- 2004–2009: Perth Wildcats
- 2009–2014: Townsville Crocodiles
- 2014–2015: Adelaide 36ers

Coaching
- 2021–2023: Brisbane Bullets (assistant) sacked
- 2023–2025: Southern Districts Spartans
- 2025–: Beijing Royal Fighters (assistant) sacked

Career highlights
- As player: 2012 Olympian for the Australian Boomers; All-NBL Second Team (2012); All-NBL Third Team (2011); NBL Most Improved Player (2005); QBL Champion (2017); QBL Champion (2018); As coach: NBL1 North Champion (2025); NBL1 North Coach of the Year (2025)

Peter Crawford (born 6 November 1979) is an Australian basketball coach and former player.

== Early life ==
Crawford was born in Mount Isa, Queensland. He attended Townsville State High School in Townsville, Queensland.

== Playing career ==
In 1998, Crawford was a member of the Townsville Heat's losing ABA semi-final team. Two years later, he helped the Heat win the QBL championship.

At the age of 19, Crawford made his NBL debut for the Townsville Crocodiles in 1999. In 2001, he was a member of the Crocodiles' losing grand final team. In 2004, he was cut by Townsville and was picked up by the Perth Wildcats. In his first season with a Wildcats, he was named the NBL Most Improved Player. From 2007 to 2011, he played for the Perry Lakes Hawks of the State Basketball League.

In 2009, Crawford left the Wildcats and returned to the Townsville Crocodiles, where he spent the next five seasons. In 2011, he was named to the All-NBL Third Team. A year later, he earned All-NBL Second Team honours. Crawford is the all-time leader in games played for the Crocodiles with 292 games, passing Robert Rose (258) in the 2012–13 season.

Peter Crawford represented Australia at the 2012 Summer Olympics in London as a member of the Australian men’s basketball team, the Boomers, making his Olympic debut at age 32. Australia finished seventh overall after progressing from the group stage with victories over China, Great Britain and Russia before being eliminated by the eventual gold medalists, the United States, in the quarter-finals. Crawford appeared in two games during the tournament, averaging 3.0 minutes and 2.0 points per game while shooting 40 percent from the field. His Olympic selection capped a distinguished National Basketball League career and marked the highest international honour of his playing career.

Crawford's final season in the NBL, the 2014–15 season, was spent with the Adelaide 36ers.

In 2015 and 2016, Crawford played for the West Adelaide Bearcats in the South Australian Premier League. He then played for the Townsville Heat, helping them win a championship in 2017 and 2018.

In November 2025, Crawford was inducted into the Basketball Queensland Hall of Fame.

== Coaching career ==
In 2021, Crawford joined the Brisbane Bullets as an assistant coach for the 2021–22 NBL season. He parted ways with the Bullets following the 2022–23 NBL season.

Crawford joined the Southern Districts Spartans men's team as head coach for the 2023 NBL1 North season. The Spartans men won the 2025 NBL1 North championship and Crawford was named NBL1 North Men's Coach of the Year. He parted ways with the Spartans following the 2025 season.
