= Joe Ira Clark =

American basketball player (born 1975)

Personal information
- Born: June 15, 1975 (age 51) Fort Worth, Texas, U.S.
- Listed height: 6 ft 8 in (2.03 m)
- Listed weight: 235 lb (107 kg)

Career information
- High school: Killeen (Killeen, Texas)
- College: Temple JC (1994–1996); Texas (1996–1998)
- NBA draft: 1998: undrafted
- Playing career: 1998–2019
- Position: Power forward / center

Career history
- 1998–1999: Yulon Dinos
- 1999–2000: Tanduay Rhum Masters
- 2002: Oklahoma Storm
- 2002–2003: Fabriano Basket
- 2003: Efes Pilsen
- 2003–2004: Makedonikos
- 2004–2005: UNICS Kazan
- 2005–2006: Daegu Orions
- 2006: Ülkerspor
- 2006–2007: Fenerbahçe
- 2007–2010: Al Kuwait
- 2010–2011: Gold Coast Blaze
- 2011–2012: Seoul Samsung Thunders
- 2012: Al Muharraq
- 2012–2013: Changwon LG Sakers
- 2013–2014: Busan KT Sonicboom
- 2014–2016: Ulsan Mobis Phoebus
- 2017: Jeonju KCC Egis
- 2018–2019: Ulsan Mobis Phoebus

Career highlights
- All-NBL Second Team (2011)

Joe Ira Clark, or simply Ira Clark (born June 15, 1975), is an American former professional basketball player. Born in Fort Worth, Texas, he is 2.03 meters tall and weighs 103 kilograms.

He played for Efes Pilsen and Ülkerspor and won Turkish Basketball League titles with both Istanbul arch rivals. After the end of 2005–06 season, Ülker was shut down and merged with Fenerbahçe, and he transferred to Fenerbahçe as all the current players of Ülkerspor and won his third Turkish Basketball League Championship with the club.

He also played for Daegu Orions in South Korea, Makedonikos BC in Greece and UNICS Kazan in Russia.

In the 2010–11 NBL season, Clark played for the Gold Coast Blaze.

On November 7, 2011, Clark was signed by a South Korean basketball club, Seoul Samsung Thunders who released Peter John Ramos the day before.

He played for Ulsan Mobis Phoebus of the Korean Basketball League. He retired and became an assistant coach for Ulsan Mobis Phoebus.

He resigned as an assistant coach after 2021~2022 season.

== Honors in Turkey ==
- 2002–03: Turkish Basketball League Champions with Efes Pilsen
- 2005–06: Turkish Basketball League Champions with Ülkerspor
- 2006–07: Turkish Basketball League Champions with Fenerbahçe
