= 2011–12 NBL season =

Professional basketball season

- League: National Basketball League
- Season: 2011–12
- Dates: 7 October 2011 – 24 April 2012
- Teams: 9
- TV partners: Australia: Network Ten; One HD; New Zealand: Sky Sport; Online: FIBA TV

Regular season
- Season champions: New Zealand Breakers
- Season MVP: (United States) Kevin Lisch (Perth)

Finals
- Champions: New Zealand Breakers (2nd title)
- Runners-up: Perth Wildcats
- Semi-finalists: Gold Coast Blaze; Townsville Crocodiles
- Finals MVP: (Australia) C. J. Bruton (New Zealand)

Statistical leaders
Points	(United States) Kevin Lisch (Perth)	17.6
Rebounds	(Australia) Julian Khazzouh (Sydney)	10.7
Assists	(United States) Cedric Jackson (New Zealand)	6.4

NBL seasons
- ← 2010–11 2012–13 →

The 2011–12 NBL season was the 34th season of competition since its establishment in 1979. A total of nine teams contested the league. The regular season was played between 7 October 2011 and 25 March 2012, followed by a post-season involving the top four in April 2012. The schedule was announced on 19 May 2011. The New Zealand Breakers successfully defended their 2010–2011 title.

Broadcast rights were held by free-to-air network Channel Ten and its digital sports sister station One, in the second year of a five-year deal, through to the 2014–15 season. In New Zealand, Sky Sport once again provided coverage.

Sponsorship included iiNet entering its second and penultimate year as league naming rights sponsor and Centrebet in the final year as the official sports betting partner. Spalding provided equipment including the official game ball, with AND1 supplying team apparel and New Era headwear.

== Pre-season ==
NBL Sunshine State Challenge, a round robin competition with a final series, involving all nine sides, was held between September 22–24, 2011 in Rockhampton, Ipswich, on the Gold Coast and Brisbane. Perth Wildcats were pre-season champions for the second year in a row.

=== New Zealand Breakers pre-season ===
13 August 2011	New Zealand Breakers	69–67	Drake University	Atlas Place, Auckland

15 September 2011	New Zealand Breakers	78–70	Wollongong Hawks	Claudelands Arena, Hamilton
				Attendance: 3,200

17 September 2011	New Zealand Breakers	75–74	Wollongong Hawks	TECT Arena at Baypark, Tauranga

2 October 2011	New Zealand Breakers	93–54	NZNBL Invitational	North Shore Events Centre, Auckland

=== Gold Coast Blaze pre-season ===
13 August 2011	Gold Coast Blaze	90–68	University of Texas at San Antonio	Carrara Indoor Stadium, Gold Coast

23 August 2011	Gold Coast Blaze	73–84	Melbourne Tigers	USQ Clive Berghofer Recreation Centre, Toowoomba

3 September 2011	Gold Coast Blaze	97–79	Cairns Taipans	Auchenflower Stadium, Brisbane

=== Cairns Taipans pre-season ===
17 August 2011	Cairns Taipans	84–58	University of Texas at San Antonio	Bendigo Bank Basketball Stadium, Cairns

30 September 2011	Cairns Taipans	77–87	Gold Coast Blaze	Bendigo Bank Basketball Stadium, Cairns

==== 2011 China Intercontinental Club Championship ====
23 August 2011	Xinjiang Flying Tigers	66–79	Cairns Taipans	Jiamusi Arena, Jiamusi, China

24 August 2011	Cairns Taipans	88–63	Kentucky Bisons	Jiamusi Arena, Jiamusi, China

===== Final =====
28 August 2011	Alba Berlin	84–67	Cairns Taipans	MasterCard Center, Beijing, China

=== Sydney Kings pre-season ===
19 August 2011	Sydney Kings	95–62	Drake University	Northern Beaches Indoor Sports Centre, Sydney

2 September 2011	Sydney Kings	103–58	Waratah League All-Stars	Bridgecoast Stadium, Terrigal

9 September 2011	Sydney Kings	82–89	Gold Coast Blaze	Tamworth Sports Dome, Tamworth

10 September 2011	Sydney Kings	105–93	Gold Coast Blaze	Tamworth Sports Dome, Tamworth

=== Melbourne Tigers pre-season ===
26 August 2011	Melbourne Tigers	101–83	Gold Coast Blaze	Sportz Central, Coffs Harbour

4 September 2011	Melbourne Tigers	60–96	Australia	Melbourne

8 September 2011	Melbourne Tigers	86–63	Seoul SK Knights	State Netball and Hockey Centre, Melbourne

14 September 2011	Melbourne Tigers	83–84	Sydney Kings	Kilsyth Sports Centre, Melbourne

15 September 2011	Melbourne Tigers	79–62	Sydney Kings	ARC Stadium, Warrnambool

29 September 2011	Melbourne Tigers	89–86	Adelaide 36ers	Geelong Arena, Geelong

=== Wollongong Hawks pre-season ===
28 August 2011	Wollongong Hawks	82–54	Sydney Kings	Illawarra Basketball Stadium, Wollongong

=== Perth Wildcats pre-season ===
30 August 2011	Perth Wildcats	85–75	Lakeside Lightning	Lakeside Recreation Centre, Perth

2 September 2011	Perth Wildcats	104–88	Lakeside Lightning	Willetton Basketball Stadium, Perth

3 September 2011	Perth Wildcats	92–111	Lakeside Lightning	Joondalup Basketball Stadium, Perth

==== 2011 Cable Beach Invitational ====
30 September 2011	Perth Wildcats	vs.	Singapore Slingers	Cable Beach, Broome

1 October 2011	Perth Wildcats	66–23	Shanghai Sharks	Cable Beach, Broome

Perth vs. Singapore cancelled due to poor condition of the outdoor court.

=== Townsville Crocodiles pre-season ===
2 September 2011	Townsville Crocodiles	85–82	Cairns Taipans	RSL Stadium, Townsville

16 September 2011	Townsville Crocodiles	72–92	Perth Wildcats	RSL Stadium, Townsville

=== Adelaide 36ers pre-season ===
3 September 2011	Adelaide 36ers	84–100	Wollongong Hawks	Schweppes Arena, Ulverstone

4 September 2011	Adelaide 36ers	81–83	Wollongong Hawks	Devenport Basketball Stadium, Devonport

10 September 2011	Adelaide 36ers	91–86	Cairns Taipans	STARplex Gawler, Adelaide

11 September 2011	Adelaide 36ers	87–82	Cairns Taipans	Adelaide Arena, Adelaide

=== 2011 NBL Sunshine State Challenge ===
17 September 2011	Townsville Crocodiles	59–98	Perth Wildcats	Hegvold Stadium, Rockhampton

22 September 2011	Cairns Taipans	55–57	Wollongong Hawks	The Southport School, Gold Coast

22 September 2011	Melbourne Tigers	63–85	Perth Wildcats	The Southport School, Gold Coast

22 September 2011	New Zealand Breakers	74–94	Sydney Kings	The Southport School, Gold Coast

22 September 2011	Gold Coast Blaze	94–78	Adelaide 36ers	The Southport School, Gold Coast

23 September 2011	Cairns Taipans	55–77	New Zealand Breakers	Ipswich Basketball Stadium, Ipswich

23 September 2011	Adelaide 36ers	96–88	Sydney Kings	Auchenflower Stadium, Brisbane

23 September 2011	Melbourne Tigers	69–66	Wollongong Hawks	Carina Basketball Stadium, Brisbane

23 September 2011	Gold Coast Blaze	70–76	Townsville Crocodiles	Gold Coast Convention Centre, Gold Coast

==== Finals ====
24 September 2011	Melbourne Tigers	89–66	Townsville Crocodiles	Chandler Arena, Brisbane

24 September 2011	Wollongong Hawks	69–79	Adelaide 36ers	Chandler Arena, Brisbane

24 September 2011	Gold Coast Blaze	107–100	New Zealand Breakers	Chandler Arena, Brisbane

24 September 2011	Cairns Taipans	98–63	Queensland All-Stars	Chandler Arena, Brisbane

24 September 2011	Perth Wildcats	84–77	Sydney Kings	Chandler Arena, Brisbane

Perth Wildcats win Sunshine State Challenge.

== Regular season ==
=== Round 1 ===
7 October 2011	Melbourne Tigers	82–76	Sydney Kings	State Netball and Hockey Centre, Melbourne
One				Attendance: 3,500

7 October 2011	Gold Coast Blaze	87–102	New Zealand Breakers	Gold Coast Convention Centre, Gold Coast
.				Attendance: 3,446

8 October 2011	Adelaide 36ers	69–102	Perth Wildcats	Adelaide Arena, Adelaide
One				Attendance: 5,683

8 October 2011	Cairns Taipans	81–76	Townsville Crocodiles	Cairns Convention Centre, Cairns
.				Attendance: 4,834

9 October 2011	Wollongong Hawks	82–98	New Zealand Breakers	WIN Entertainment Centre, Wollongong
One				Attendance: 3,329

=== Round 2 ===
14 October 2011	Townsville Crocodiles	95–67	Cairns Taipans	Townsville Entertainment Centre, Townsville
One				Attendance: 3,790

14 October 2011	Perth Wildcats	92–76	Melbourne Tigers	Challenge Stadium, Perth
.				Attendance: 4,300

15 October 2011	Sydney Kings	61–98	New Zealand Breakers	Sydney Entertainment Centre, Sydney
One				Attendance: 5,562

16 October 2011	Wollongong Hawks	97–89	Adelaide 36ers	WIN Entertainment Centre, Wollongong
.				Attendance: 2,966

16 October 2011	Gold Coast Blaze	82–91	Cairns Taipans	Brisbane Convention & Exhibition Centre, Brisbane
One				Attendance: 2,048

=== Round 3 ===
21 October 2011	Wollongong Hawks	58–83	Gold Coast Blaze	WIN Entertainment Centre, Wollongong
One				Attendance: 3,693

21 October 2011	Adelaide 36ers	71–94	Sydney Kings	Adelaide Arena, Adelaide
.				Attendance: 4,495

22 October 2011	Melbourne Tigers	67–64	New Zealand Breakers	State Netball and Hockey Centre, Melbourne
One				Attendance: 3,500

22 October 2011	Townsville Crocodiles	85–93	Perth Wildcats	Townsville Entertainment Centre, Townsville
.				Attendance: 3,594

23 October 2011	Sydney Kings	95–89	Wollongong Hawks	Sydney Entertainment Centre, Sydney
One				Attendance: 3,556

=== Round 4 ===
28 October 2011	New Zealand Breakers	76–59	Sydney Kings	Vector Arena, Auckland
Sky Sport				Attendance: 6,900

28 October 2011	Cairns Taipans	64–69	Wollongong Hawks	Cairns Convention Centre, Cairns
.				Attendance: 4,853

28 October 2011	Perth Wildcats	92–100	Adelaide 36ers	Challenge Stadium, Perth
One				Attendance: 4,200

29 October 2011	Townsville Crocodiles	78–70	Gold Coast Blaze	Townsville Entertainment Centre, Townsville
One				Attendance: 3,702

30 October 2011	Wollongong Hawks	74–82	Melbourne Tigers	WIN Entertainment Centre, Wollongong
One				Attendance: 3,693

=== Round 5 ===
3 November 2011	New Zealand Breakers	99–90	Adelaide 36ers	North Shore Events Centre, Auckland
Sky Sport				Attendance: 2,893

4 November 2011	Sydney Kings	76–94	Melbourne Tigers	Sydney Entertainment Centre, Sydney
One				Attendance: 6,010

5 November 2011	Perth Wildcats	87–71	Wollongong Hawks	Challenge Stadium, Perth
One				Attendance: 4,000

6 November 2011	Melbourne Tigers	80–63	Cairns Taipans	State Netball and Hockey Centre, Melbourne
One				Attendance: 3,030

=== Round 6 ===
11 November 2011	New Zealand Breakers	63–81	Wollongong Hawks	North Shore Events Centre, Auckland
Sky Sport				Attendance: 3,300

11 November 2011	Melbourne Tigers	88–95 (OT)	Townsville Crocodiles	State Netball and Hockey Centre, Melbourne
One				Attendance: 2,972

12 November 2011	Gold Coast Blaze	107–92	Perth Wildcats	Gold Coast Convention Centre, Gold Coast
One				Attendance: 3,488

12 November 2011	Adelaide 36ers	104–113 (OT)	Sydney Kings	Adelaide Arena, Adelaide
.				Attendance: 5,049

13 November 2011	Cairns Taipans	64–70	Perth Wildcats	Cairns Convention Centre, Cairns
One				Attendance: 4,513

=== Round 7 ===
17 November 2011	Sydney Kings	67–85	Cairns Taipans	Sydney Entertainment Centre, Sydney
.				Attendance: 4,037

18 November 2011	Melbourne Tigers	87–82	Perth Wildcats	State Netball and Hockey Centre, Melbourne
One				Attendance: 3,132

19 November 2011	Gold Coast Blaze	87–75	Townsville Crocodiles	Gold Coast Convention Centre, Gold Coast
One				Attendance: 3,107

19 November 2011	Adelaide 36ers	95–89	Melbourne Tigers	Adelaide Arena, Adelaide
.				Attendance: 6,175

20 November 2011	Cairns Taipans	80–78	New Zealand Breakers	Cairns Convention Centre, Cairns
.				Attendance: 4,379

20 November 2011	Wollongong Hawks	70–86	Perth Wildcats	WIN Entertainment Centre, Wollongong
One				Attendance: 2,812

=== Round 8 ===
24 November 2011	New Zealand Breakers	88–74	Townsville Crocodiles	Vector Arena, Auckland
Sky Sport				Attendance: 4,571

25 November 2011	Melbourne Tigers	80–89	Sydney Kings	State Netball and Hockey Centre, Melbourne
One				Attendance: 3,189

26 November 2011	Adelaide 36ers	82–95	Gold Coast Blaze	Adelaide Arena, Adelaide
One				Attendance: 4,708

27 November 2011	Perth Wildcats	103–92	Sydney Kings	Challenge Stadium, Perth
One				Attendance: 4,000

=== Round 9 ===
2 December 2011	New Zealand Breakers	108–98 (2OT)	Melbourne Tigers	North Shore Events Centre, Auckland
Sky Sport				Attendance: 3,467

2 December 2011	Cairns Taipans	87–78	Gold Coast Blaze	Cairns Convention Centre, Cairns
One				Attendance: 4,542

3 December 2011	Townsville Crocodiles	82–81	Wollongong Hawks	Townsville Entertainment Centre, Townsville
One				Attendance: 3,550

4 December 2011	Perth Wildcats	84–96	Adelaide 36ers	Challenge Stadium, Perth
.				Attendance: 4,000

4 December 2011	Sydney Kings	69–64	Cairns Taipans	Sydney Entertainment Centre, Sydney
One				Attendance: 4,068

=== Round 10 ===
8 December 2011	New Zealand Breakers	106–85	Gold Coast Blaze	North Shore Events Centre, Auckland
Sky Sport				Attendance: 2,954

8 December 2011	Sydney Kings	107–103 (OT)	Adelaide 36ers	Sydney Entertainment Centre, Sydney
.				Attendance: 3,624

10 December 2011	Cairns Taipans	79–77 (OT)	Melbourne Tigers	Cairns Convention Centre, Cairns
One				Attendance: 4,787

11 December 2011	Adelaide 36ers	73–86	New Zealand Breakers	Adelaide Arena, Adelaide
.				Attendance: 4,350

11 December 2011	Townsville Crocodiles	80–69	Sydney Kings	Townsville Entertainment Centre, Townsville
.				Attendance: 3,605

11 December 2011	Wollongong Hawks	70–98	Perth Wildcats	WIN Entertainment Centre, Wollongong
One				Attendance: 2,810

=== Round 11 ===
16 December 2011	New Zealand Breakers	85–62	Cairns Taipans	North Shore Events Centre, Auckland
Sky Sport				Attendance: 3,894

16 December 2011	Adelaide 36ers	87–63	Wollongong Hawks	Adelaide Arena, Adelaide
One				Attendance: 3,597

17 December 2011	Gold Coast Blaze	77–74	Perth Wildcats	Gold Coast Convention Centre, Gold Coast
One				Attendance: 3,227

18 December 2011	Melbourne Tigers	93–80	Townsville Crocodiles	State Netball and Hockey Centre, Melbourne
One				Attendance: 3,500

=== Round 12 ===
23 December 2011	Melbourne Tigers	67–65	Cairns Taipans	State Netball and Hockey Centre, Melbourne
One				Attendance: 3,217

23 December 2011	Sydney Kings	93–100	Townsville Crocodiles	Sydney Entertainment Centre, Sydney
.				Attendance: 5,435

23 December 2011	Gold Coast Blaze	96–77	Adelaide 36ers	Gold Coast Convention Centre, Gold Coast
.				Attendance: 3,280

23 December 2011	Perth Wildcats	86–62	New Zealand Breakers	Challenge Stadium, Perth
.				Attendance: 4,400

=== Round 13 ===
30 December 2011	Sydney Kings	77–96	Adelaide 36ers	Sydney Entertainment Centre, Sydney
One				Attendance: 6,165

31 December 2011	Wollongong Hawks	83–86	Sydney Kings	WIN Entertainment Centre, Wollongong
.				Attendance: 4,016

31 December 2011	Cairns Taipans	74–57	New Zealand Breakers	Cairns Convention Centre, Cairns
.				Attendance: 5,289

31 December 2011	Gold Coast Blaze	72–79	Melbourne Tigers	Gold Coast Convention Centre, Gold Coast
One				Attendance: 4,255

31 December 2011	Townsville Crocodiles	76–97	Perth Wildcats	Townsville Entertainment Centre, Townsville
.				Attendance: 4,781

=== Round 14 ===
6 January 2012	Perth Wildcats	72–67	Melbourne Tigers	Challenge Stadium, Perth
One				Attendance: 4,200

7 January 2012	Sydney Kings	102–96	Gold Coast Blaze	Sydney Entertainment Centre, Sydney
.				Attendance: 4,915

7 January 2012	Wollongong Hawks	57–72	Townsville Crocodiles	WIN Entertainment Centre, Wollongong
One				Attendance: 2,902

7 January 2012	Adelaide 36ers	67–72	Cairns Taipans	Adelaide Arena, Adelaide
.				Attendance: 6,194

8 January 2012	Melbourne Tigers	79–90	New Zealand Breakers	State Netball and Hockey Centre, Melbourne
One				Attendance: 3,500

=== Round 15 ===
13 January 2012	New Zealand Breakers	80–63	Adelaide 36ers	North Shore Events Centre, Auckland
Sky Sport				Attendance: 4,400

13 January 2012	Wollongong Hawks	59–61	Cairns Taipans	WIN Entertainment Centre, Wollongong
One				Attendance: 2,713

13 January 2012	Perth Wildcats	92–80	Gold Coast Blaze	Challenge Stadium, Perth
.				Attendance: 4,000

14 January 2012	Townsville Crocodiles	118–114 (2OT)	Sydney Kings	Townsville Entertainment Centre, Townsville
One				Attendance: 4,657

15 January 2012	Melbourne Tigers	60–73	Gold Coast Blaze	State Netball and Hockey Centre, Melbourne
One				Attendance: 3,500

=== Round 16 ===
19 January 2012	New Zealand Breakers	91–77	Melbourne Tigers	North Shore Events Centre, Auckland
Sky Sport				Attendance: 4,000

20 January 2012	Sydney Kings	75–76	Perth Wildcats	Sydney Entertainment Centre, Sydney
One				Attendance: 7,532

20 January 2012	Cairns Taipans	74–80	Wollongong Hawks	Cairns Convention Centre, Cairns
.				Attendance: 4,747

21 January 2012	Gold Coast Blaze	92–78	Melbourne Tigers	Gold Coast Convention Centre, Gold Coast
One				Attendance: 4,170

21 January 2012	Townsville Crocodiles	65–63	Wollongong Hawks	Townsville Entertainment Centre, Townsville
.				Attendance: 3,635

22 January 2012	Adelaide 36ers	75–86	Cairns Taipans	Adelaide Arena, Adelaide
One				Attendance: 5,076

=== Round 17 ===
25 January 2012	Townsville Crocodiles	79–69	Adelaide 36ers	Townsville Entertainment Centre, Townsville
.				Attendance: 3,622

27 January 2012	New Zealand Breakers	93–64	Sydney Kings	Vector Arena, Auckland
Sky Sport				Attendance: 7,979

27 January 2012	Wollongong Hawks	90–68	Melbourne Tigers	WIN Entertainment Centre, Wollongong
One				Attendance: 3,456

28 January 2012	Perth Wildcats	87–55	Townsville Crocodiles	Challenge Stadium, Perth
One				Attendance: 4,000

29 January 2012	Gold Coast Blaze	76–49	Cairns Taipans	Gold Coast Convention Centre, Gold Coast
One				Attendance: 3,088

=== Round 18 ===
2 February 2012	New Zealand Breakers	83–77	Perth Wildcats	North Shore Events Centre, Auckland
Sky Sport				Attendance: 4,000

3 February 2012	Melbourne Tigers	87–81	Adelaide 36ers	State Netball and Hockey Centre, Melbourne
One				Attendance: 2,126

3 February 2012	Cairns Taipans	85–81	Townsville Crocodiles	Cairns Convention Centre, Cairns
.				Attendance: 4,835

4 February 2012	Gold Coast Blaze	91–50	Wollongong Hawks	Gold Coast Convention Centre, Gold Coast
One				Attendance: 3,122

5 February 2012	Townsville Crocodiles	89–71	Adelaide 36ers	Townsville Entertainment Centre, Townsville
One				Attendance: 3,322

=== Round 19 ===
10 February 2012	Sydney Kings	72–84	Gold Coast Blaze	Sydney Entertainment Centre, Sydney
One				Attendance: 5,863

10 February 2012	Cairns Taipans	76–67	Perth Wildcats	Cairns Convention Centre, Cairns
.				Attendance: 4,609

11 February 2012	Wollongong Hawks	80–64	New Zealand Breakers	WIN Entertainment Centre, Wollongong
One				Attendance: 3,566

12 February 2012	Adelaide 36ers	79–74	Townsville Crocodiles	Adelaide Arena, Adelaide
One				Attendance: 5,072

=== Round 20 ===
16 February 2012	New Zealand Breakers	82–74	Wollongong Hawks	North Shore Events Centre, Auckland
Sky Sport				Attendance: 3,533

17 February 2012	Townsville Crocodiles	75–43	Cairns Taipans	Townsville Entertainment Centre, Townsville
One				Attendance: 4,100

18 February 2012	Cairns Taipans	77–56	Melbourne Tigers	Cairns Convention Centre, Cairns
One				Attendance: 4,872

19 February 2012	Perth Wildcats	91–74	Sydney Kings	Challenge Stadium, Perth
.				Attendance: 4,200

19 February 2012	Gold Coast Blaze	66–80	Townsville Crocodiles	Brisbane Convention & Exhibition Centre, Brisbane
One				Attendance: 2,724

=== Round 21 ===
23 February 2012	New Zealand Breakers	81–70	Townsville Crocodiles	North Shore Events Centre, Auckland
Sky Sport				Attendance: 4,000

24 February 2012	Wollongong Hawks	86–94	Gold Coast Blaze	WIN Entertainment Centre, Wollongong
One				Attendance: 3,016

24 February 2012	Adelaide 36ers	79–90	Perth Wildcats	Adelaide Arena, Adelaide
.				Attendance: 4,255

25 February 2012	Melbourne Tigers	83–92	Adelaide 36ers	State Netball and Hockey Centre, Melbourne
One				Attendance: 3,500

26 February 2012	Sydney Kings	71–69	Townsville Crocodiles	Sydney Entertainment Centre, Sydney
.				Attendance: 5,824

26 February 2012	Perth Wildcats	78–83	Cairns Taipans	Challenge Stadium, Perth
.				Attendance: 4,200

26 February 2012	Gold Coast Blaze	85–72	Wollongong Hawks	Gold Coast Convention Centre, Gold Coast
One				Attendance: 3,266

=== Round 22 ===
2 March 2012	Sydney Kings	61–66	Melbourne Tigers	Sydney Entertainment Centre, Sydney
One				Attendance: 4,899

3 March 2012	Adelaide 36ers	77–73	Wollongong Hawks	Adelaide Arena, Adelaide
One				Attendance: 4,585

3 March 2012	Cairns Taipans	77–94	Gold Coast Blaze	Cairns Convention Centre, Cairns
.				Attendance: 5,132

4 March 2012	Townsville Crocodiles	67–64	Melbourne Tigers	Townsville Entertainment Centre, Townsville
.				Attendance: 3,481

4 March 2012	Perth Wildcats	99–101 (OT)	New Zealand Breakers	Challenge Stadium, Perth
.				Attendance: 4,400

4 March 2012	Gold Coast Blaze	90–83	Sydney Kings	Gold Coast Convention Centre, Gold Coast
One				Attendance: 3,071

=== Round 23 ===
9 March 2012	Wollongong Hawks	81–92	Sydney Kings	WIN Entertainment Centre, Wollongong
One				Attendance: 3,616

10 March 2012	Adelaide 36ers	76–91	New Zealand Breakers	Adelaide Arena, Adelaide
One				Attendance: 4,936

10 March 2012	Townsville Crocodiles	88–76	Gold Coast Blaze	Townsville Entertainment Centre, Townsville
.				Attendance: 3,969

11 March 2012	Perth Wildcats	94–59	Cairns Taipans	Challenge Stadium, Perth
One				Attendance: 4,314

=== Round 24 ===
15 March 2012	New Zealand Breakers	109–93	Gold Coast Blaze	North Shore Events Centre, Auckland
Sky Sport				Attendance: 4,000

16 March 2012	Perth Wildcats	101–66	Townsville Crocodiles	Challenge Stadium, Perth
One				Attendance: 4,200

17 March 2012	Adelaide 36ers	83–84	Gold Coast Blaze	Adelaide Arena, Adelaide
One				Attendance: 5,177

17 March 2012	Cairns Taipans	74–80	Sydney Kings	Cairns Convention Centre, Cairns
.				Attendance: 5,190

18 March 2012	Melbourne Tigers	61–71	Wollongong Hawks	State Netball and Hockey Centre, Melbourne
One				Attendance: 3,267

=== Round 25 ===
23 March 2012	Melbourne Tigers	71–72	Perth Wildcats	State Netball and Hockey Centre, Melbourne
One				Attendance: 3,349

23 March 2012	Cairns Taipans	79–75	Adelaide 36ers	Cairns Convention Centre, Cairns
.				Attendance: 4,813

23 March 2012	Townsville Crocodiles	69–76	New Zealand Breakers	Townsville Entertainment Centre, Townsville
.				Attendance: 4,133

24 March 2012	Sydney Kings	68–77	Wollongong Hawks	Sydney Entertainment Centre, Sydney
One				Attendance: 7,282

25 March 2012	Wollongong Hawks	92–78	Adelaide 36ers	WIN Entertainment Centre, Wollongong
.				Attendance: 5,032

25 March 2012	Gold Coast Blaze	94–71	New Zealand Breakers	Gold Coast Convention Centre, Gold Coast
One				Attendance: 4,425

== Ladder ==
Pos	2011–12 NBL season											
Pos	Team	Pld	W	L	PCT	Last 5	Streak	Home	Away	PF	PA	PP
1	New Zealand Breakers	28	21	7	75.00%	4–1	L1	13–1	8–6	2382	2177	109.42%
2	Perth Wildcats	28	19	9	67.86%	3–2	W3	10–4	9–5	2434	2171	112.11%
3	Gold Coast Blaze	28	17	11	60.71%	3–2	W2	10–4	7–7	2387	2253	105.95%
4	Townsville Crocodiles^{1}	28	15	13	53.37%	2–3	L2	11–3	4–10	2213	2210	100.14%
5	Cairns Taipans^{1}	28	15	13	53.37%	2–3	W1	9–5	6–8	2025	2107	96.11%
6	Melbourne Tigers^{2}	28	11	17	39.29%	1–4	L3	7–7	4–10	2156	2239	96.29%
7	Sydney Kings^{2}	28	11	17	39.29%	2–3	L1	5–9	6–8	2279	2423	94.06%
8	Wollongong Hawks	28	9	19	32.14%	3–2	W3	4–10	5–9	2093	2232	93.77%
9	Adelaide 36ers	28	8	20	28.57%	1–4	L4	4–10	4–10	2297	2454	93.60%

Updated to match(es) played on 25 March 2012. Source: NBL.com.au

The NBL tie-breaker system as outlined in the NBL Rules and Regulations states that in the case of an identical win–loss record, the results in games played between the teams will determine order of seeding.

^{1}Head-to-head between Townsville Crocodiles and Cairns Taipans (2-2). Townsville Crocodiles won For and Against (+51).

^{2}Melbourne Tigers won head-to-head (3-1).

=== Ladder Progression ===
- Numbers highlighted in green indicate that the team finished the round inside the top four.
- Numbers highlighted in blue indicates the team finished first on the ladder in that round.
- Numbers highlighted in red indicates the team finished last place on the ladder in that round.

2011–12 NBL season
Team	1	2	3	4	5	6	7	8	9	10	11	12	13	14	15	16	17	18	19	20	21	22	23	24	25
Adelaide 36ers	9	8	9	9	9	9	9	9	8	8	8	8	8	8	8	8	8	9	9	8	8	8	8	8	9
Cairns Taipans	4	3	4	5	5	8	4	5	6	4	6	6	6	4	4	4	5	5	4	4	4	5	5	5	5
Gold Coast Blaze	7	7	7	8	8	7	5	4	4	7	4	4	4	7	6	5	4	4	3	5	3	3	3	3	3
Melbourne Tigers	3	6	3	3	2	3	2	3	3	5	3	3	3	5	5	6	6	6	6	6	6	6	6	6	6
New Zealand Breakers	1	1	2	1	1	1	3	2	1	1	1	1	2	2	2	1	2	1	1	1	1	1	1	1	1
Perth Wildcats	2	2	1	2	3	2	1	1	2	2	2	2	1	1	1	2	1	2	2	2	2	2	2	2	2
Sydney Kings	6	9	5	6	6	5	7	6	7	6	7	7	7	6	7	7	7	7	7	7	7	7	7	7	7
Townsville Crocodiles	5	4	6	4	4	4	6	7	5	3	5	5	5	3	3	3	3	3	5	3	5	4	4	4	4
Wollongong Hawks	8	5	8	7	7	6	8	8	9	9	9	9	9	9	9	9	9	8	8	9	9	9	9	9	8

== Finals ==
The 2011–12 National Basketball League Finals were played between 30 March 2012 and 25 April 2012, consisting of two best-of-three semi-final and final series, where the higher seed hosted the first and third games.

=== Playoff Seedings ===
1. New Zealand Breakers
2. Perth Wildcats
3. Gold Coast Blaze
4. Townsville Crocodiles

The NBL tie-breaker system as outlined in the NBL Rules and Regulations states that in the case of an identical win–loss record, the results in games played between the two teams will determine order of seeding.

Under this system, Cairns did not qualify for the playoffs by equalling Townsville's win–loss record, as the latter held advantage in the tiebreaker (2-2, +51 points).

=== Playoff bracket ===
Semifinals
1	New Zealand Breakers	82	94	97
4	Townsville Crocodiles	99	83	80
2	Perth Wildcats	85	70	88
3	Gold Coast Blaze	70	72	67

Grand Final
1	New Zealand Breakers	104	86	79
2	Perth Wildcats	98	87	73

=== Semi-finals ===
30 March 2012	New Zealand Breakers	82–99	Townsville Crocodiles	Vector Arena, Auckland
Sky Sport				Attendance: 8,146

1 April 2012	Perth Wildcats	85–70	Gold Coast Blaze	Challenge Stadium, Perth
One				Attendance: 4,400

4 April 2012	Gold Coast Blaze	72–70	Perth Wildcats	Gold Coast Convention Centre, Gold Coast
One				Attendance: 3,144

5 April 2012	Townsville Crocodiles	83–94	New Zealand Breakers	Townsville Entertainment Centre, Townsville
One				Attendance: 4,632

7 April 2012	New Zealand Breakers	97–80	Townsville Crocodiles	Vector Arena, Auckland
Sky Sport				Attendance: 7,500

7 April 2012	Perth Wildcats	88–67	Gold Coast Blaze	Challenge Stadium, Perth
One				Attendance: 4,400

=== Grand final ===
12 April 2012	New Zealand Breakers	104–98 (OT)	Perth Wildcats	Vector Arena, Auckland
Sky Sport				Attendance: 9,125

20 April 2012	Perth Wildcats	87–86	New Zealand Breakers	Challenge Stadium, Perth
One				Attendance: 4,400

24 April 2012	New Zealand Breakers	79–73	Perth Wildcats	Vector Arena, Auckland
Sky Sport				Attendance: 9,258

== Season statistics ==
=== Statistics leaders ===
Category	Player	Games played	Totals	Average
Points per game	Kevin Lisch (Perth Wildcats)	28	493	17.6
Rebounds per game	Julian Khazzouh (Sydney Kings)	26	281	10.8
Assists per game	Cedric Jackson (New Zealand Breakers)	27	173	6.4
Steals per game	Cedric Jackson (New Zealand Breakers)	27	67	2.5
Blocks per game	Julian Khazzouh (Sydney Kings)	26	54	2.1
Field goal percentage	Diamon Simpson (Adelaide 36ers)	27	155-262	59.2%
Three-point field goal percentage	Oscar Forman (Wollongong Hawks)	28	64-125	51.2%
Free throw percentage	Aaron Bruce (Sydney Kings)	17	63-70	90.0%

Note: regular season only

=== Top 10 Attendances ===
Attendance	Round	Date	Home	Score	Away	Venue
9,258	GF	24/04/2012	New Zealand Breakers	79-73	Perth Wildcats	Vector Arena
9,125	GF	12/04/2012	New Zealand Breakers	104-98	Perth Wildcats	Vector Arena
8,146	SF	30/03/2012	New Zealand Breakers	82-99	Townsville Crocodiles	Vector Arena
7,979	17	27/01/2012	New Zealand Breakers	93-64	Sydney Kings	Vector Arena
7,532	16	20/01/2012	Sydney Kings	75-76	Perth Wildcats	Sydney Entertainment Centre
7,500	SF	7/04/2012	New Zealand Breakers	97-80	Townsville Crocodiles	Vector Arena
7,282	25	24/03/2012	Sydney Kings	75-76	Wollongong Hawks	Sydney Entertainment Centre
6,900	4	28/10/2011	New Zealand Breakers	97-80	Sydney Kings	Vector Arena
6,194	14	7/01/2012	Adelaide 36ers	67-72	Cairns Taipans	Adelaide Arena
6,175	7	19/11/2011	Adelaide 36ers	95-89	Melbourne Tigers	Adelaide Arena

== Awards ==
=== Player of the Week ===
Round	Player	Team
1	Patty Mills	Melbourne Tigers
2	Shawn Redhage	Perth Wildcats
3	Julian Khazzouh	Sydney Kings
4	Daniel Johnson	Adelaide 36ers
5	Gary Wilkinson	New Zealand Breakers
6	Eddie Gill	Townsville Crocodiles
7	Jamar Wilson	Cairns Taipans
8	Adris Deleon	Gold Coast Blaze
9	Thomas Abercrombie	New Zealand Breakers
10	Jamar Wilson	Cairns Taipans
11	Adam Gibson	Gold Coast Blaze
12	Eddie Gill	Townsville Crocodiles
13	Cameron Tragardh	Melbourne Tigers
14	Jerai Grant	Sydney Kings
15	Jesse Wagstaff	Perth Wildcats
16	Adam Gibson	Gold Coast Blaze
17	Mat Campbell	Wollongong Hawks
18	Cedric Jackson	New Zealand Breakers
19	Oscar Forman	Wollongong Hawks
20	Peter Crawford	Townsville Crocodiles
21	Alex Loughton	Cairns Taipans
22	Adris Deleon	Gold Coast Blaze
23	Luke Schenscher	Townsville Crocodiles
24	Jerai Grant	Sydney Kings
25	Shawn Redhage	Perth Wildcats

=== Player of the Month ===
Round	Player	Team
October	Kevin Lisch	Perth Wildcats
November	Adris Deleon	Gold Coast Blaze
December	Cameron Tragardh	Melbourne Tigers
January	Jesse Wagstaff	Perth Wildcats
February	Cedric Jackson	New Zealand Breakers

=== Coach of the Month ===
Round	Player	Team
October	Andrej Lemanis	New Zealand Breakers
November	Joey Wright	Gold Coast Blaze
December	Andrej Lemanis	New Zealand Breakers
January	Rob Beveridge	Perth Wildcats
February	Aaron Fearne	Cairns Taipans

The end-of-season awards ceremony was held in the Palladium Room at Crown Casino in Melbourne on Monday, 26 March 2012:

=== Season ===
- Most Valuable Player (Andrew Gaze Trophy): Kevin Lisch, Perth Wildcats
- Rookie of the Year: Anatoly Bose, Sydney Kings
- Best Defensive Player: Damian Martin, Perth Wildcats
- Best Sixth Man: Jesse Wagstaff, Perth Wildcats
- Most Improved Player: Daniel Johnson, Adelaide 36ers
- Coach of the Year (Lindsay Gaze Trophy): Andrej Lemanis, New Zealand Breakers
- Referee of the Year: Michael Aylen
- All-NBL First Team:
  - Kevin Lisch - Perth Wildcats
  - Cedric Jackson - New Zealand Breakers
  - Julian Khazzouh - Sydney Kings
  - Mark Worthington - Gold Coast Blaze
  - Thomas Abercrombie - New Zealand Breakers
- All-NBL Second Team:
  - Jamar Wilson - Cairns Taipans
  - Adam Gibson - Gold Coast Blaze
  - Cameron Tragardh - Melbourne Tigers
  - Gary Wilkinson - New Zealand Breakers
  - Peter Crawford - Townsville Crocodiles
- All-NBL Third Team:
  - Daniel Johnson - Adelaide 36ers
  - Eddie Gill - Townsville Crocodiles
  - Damian Martin - Perth Wildcats
  - Adris Deleon - Gold Coast Blaze
  - Jesse Wagstaff - Perth Wildcats

=== Finals ===
- Grand Final Series MVP (Larry Sengstock Medal): C. J. Bruton, New Zealand Breakers
