= Peter Schenscher =

Australian cricketer (born 1962)

Personal information
- Born: 4 May 1962 (age 64); Adelaide, Australia
- Source: Cricinfo, 25 September 2020

Peter Schenscher (born 4 May 1962) is an Australian cricketer. He played in one first-class matches for South Australia in 1986/87.

== See also ==
- List of South Australian representative cricketers
