= Gary Ervin =

American professional basketball player

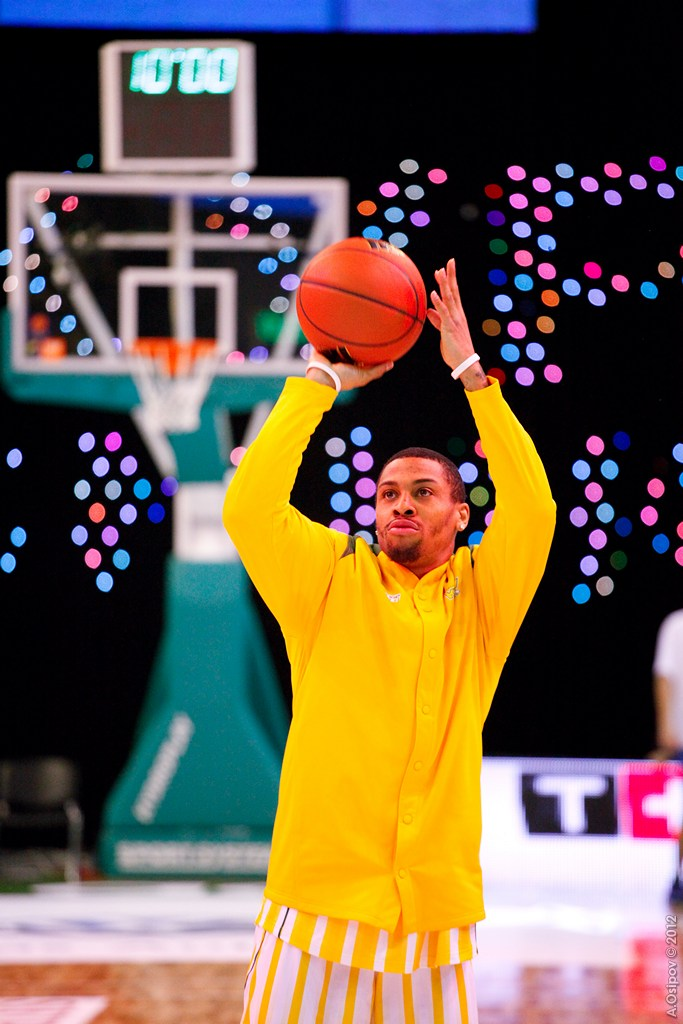

Personal information
- Born: August 9, 1983 (age 42) Brooklyn, New York, U.S.
- Listed height: 6 ft 0 in (1.83 m)
- Listed weight: 179 lb (81 kg)

Career information
- High school: Robeson (Brooklyn, New York); Notre Dame Prep (Fitchburg, Massachusetts)
- College: Mississippi State (2003–2005); Arkansas (2006–2008)
- NBA draft: 2008: undrafted
- Playing career: 2008–2015
- Position: Point guard

Career history
- 2008–2009: Sioux Falls Skyforce
- 2009: Tulsa 66ers
- 2009: Maine Red Claws
- 2010: Halifax Rainmen
- 2010–2011: Wollongong Hawks
- 2011: Trotamundos de Carabobo
- 2011–2012: BC Kyiv
- 2012–2013: Townsville Crocodiles
- 2013–2014: Adelaide 36ers
- 2014–2015: Wollongong Hawks
- 2015: La Matica
- 2015: Chorale Roanne Basket

Career highlights
- NBL Most Valuable Player (2011); All-NBL First Team (2011); All-NBL Second Team (2013); PBL All-Star (2010); PBL All-Star Game MVP (2010); SEC All-Freshman Team (2004)

Gary Ervin (born August 9, 1983) is an American professional basketball player who last played for Chorale Roanne Basket of the French LNB Pro B. He played college basketball for Mississippi State University and the University of Arkansas. Ervin was the NBL's Most Valuable Player for the 2010–11 NBL season while playing for the Wollongong Hawks.

== High school career ==
Ervin prepped at Robeson High in Brooklyn but went to Notre Dame Prep for 2002–03 where he helped Bill Barton's team go 30–9 with a national top eight finish and a pair of tournament titles – the Maine Central Institute Classic and the War on the Shore Tournament. Ervin averaged 17.0 points and 7.0 assists per game during his senior year.

== College career ==
In his freshman season at Mississippi State, Ervin was named in the 2004 SEC All-Freshman team. In 30 games, he averaged 5.4 points, 2.5 assists, 1.1 rebounds and 1.0 steals per game.

In his sophomore season, he was third in the Southeastern Conference in assists and seventh in assist-to-turnover ratio (1.58:1). In 34 games (33 starts), he averaged 7.4 points, 2.4 rebounds, 4.7 assists and 1.1 steals per game.

In 2005, Ervin transferred to Arkansas which forced him to sit out the 2005–06 season due to NCAA transfer rules.

In his junior season at Arkansas, Ervin earned SEC Player of the Week honors twice during the season, becoming the first multi-week winner for Arkansas since Jannero Pargo earned the honor twice in 2002. Ervin won his awards on Jan 8 and March 5. In 35 games (29 starts), he averaged 9.9 points, 3.6 rebounds, 4.8 assists and 1.1 steals per game.

In his senior season, Ervin and the Razorbacks lost in 2008 SEC Tournament final and were the SEC Western Division Regular Season Runners-Up. In 35 games, he averaged 9.5 points, 2.6 rebounds, 3.8 assists and 1.2 steals per game.

== Professional career ==
=== 2008–09 season ===
Ervin went undrafted in the 2008 NBA draft. On November 7, 2008, he was selected in the 4th round of the 2008 NBA D-League draft by the Sioux Falls Skyforce. On January 20, 2009, he was waived by the Skyforce. On January 25, 2009, he was acquired by the Tulsa 66ers.

=== 2009–10 season ===
On November 5, 2009, he was selected in the 4th round of the 2009 NBA D-League draft by the Maine Red Claws. On November 30, 2009, he was waived by the Red Claws after just 2 games.

On December 7, 2009, he signed with the Halifax Rainmen for the 2010 PBL season. He later won the MVP award for the 2010 PBL All-Star game.

=== 2010–11 season ===
On August 18, 2010, Ervin signed with the Wollongong Hawks for the 2010–11 NBL season.

In his first season with Wollongong, Ervin proved a sensation. In 27 games he averaged 20.1 points, 3.4 rebounds and 4.5 assists per game on his way to winning the NBL's Most Valuable Player award for 2011, becoming the first Hawk to do so since Mike Jones in 1981. He was also selected to the All-NBL first team for the 2010–11 season.

Following the conclusion of the 2010–11 NBL season, Ervin joined Trotamundos de Carabobo of Venezuela for the 2011 LBP season.

=== 2011–12 season ===
In August 2011, Ervin signed with BC Kyiv of Ukraine for the 2011–12 season.

=== 2012–13 season ===
On October 1, 2012, Ervin signed with the Townsville Crocodiles for the 2012–13 NBL season. In the months of December and January, Ervin won the Player of the Month award for both. He went on to win the 2013 Kevin Sugars Medal for being the Crocodiles MVP.

=== 2013–14 season ===
On July 10, 2013, Ervin signed with the Adelaide 36ers for the 2013–14 NBL season. On March 31, 2014, Ervin was suspended for Game 3 of the 36ers' semi-final series against the Melbourne Tigers after a kneeing incident involving Chris Goulding of the Tigers in Game 2 of the same series on March 30 was referred straight to the tribunal.

=== 2014–15 season ===
On August 1, 2014, Ervin signed with the Wollongong Hawks for the 2014–15 NBL season, returning to the club for second stint.

=== 2015–16 season ===
After a short stint with La Matica of the Dominican Republic during September 2015, Ervin signed with Chorale Roanne Basket of the French LNB Pro B on October 4. On November 14, he was released by Roanne after appearing in just four games.

== Personal ==
Ervin is the son of Gary Ervin Sr. and Mary Harris.

Ervin's fiancé, Kia Vaughn, is a professional basketball player herself. She has played in both Europe and the WNBA.
