= Gold Coast Convention and Exhibition Centre =

Convention centre in Queensland, Australia

- GCCEC
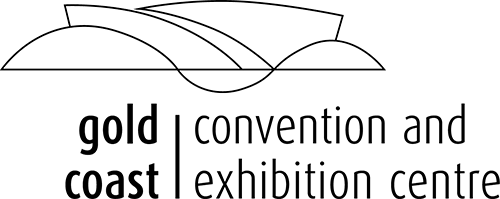

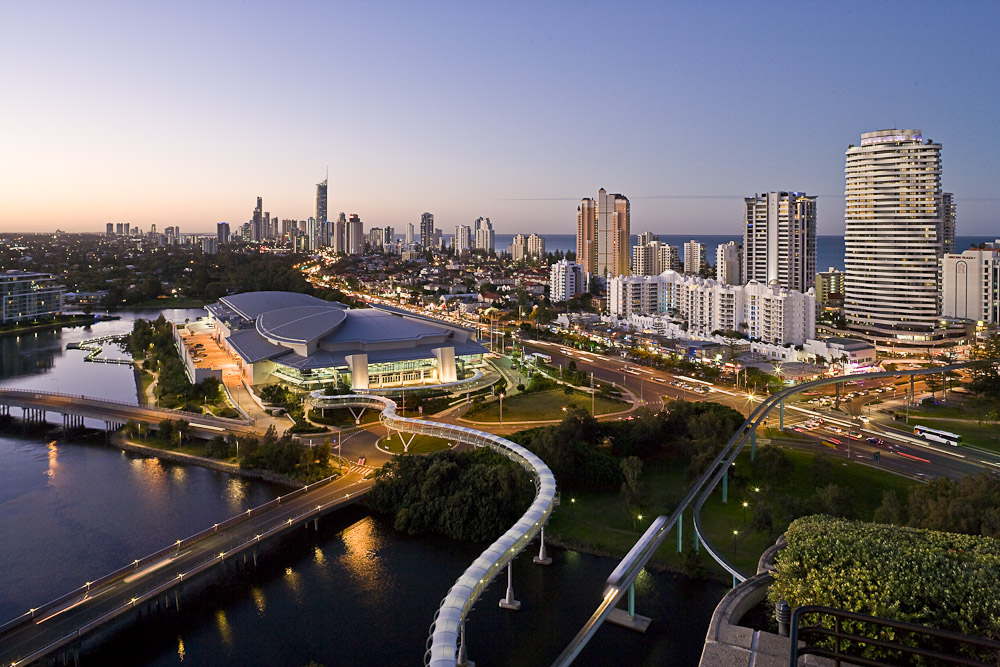
- View from The Star Gold Coast looking north towards Surfers Paradise
- Interactive map of Gold Coast Convention and Exhibition Centre
- Location: 2684–2690 Gold Coast Highway, Broadbeach, Queensland, Australia
- Coordinates: 28°1′43″S 153°25′43″E
- Owner: Queensland Government
- Operator: Star Entertainment Group
- Capacity: 6,000; Basketball/Netball: 5,269

Construction
- Groundbreaking: 2003
- Opened: 29 June 2004
- Expanded: 2009
- Cost: AU$167m
- General contractor: Brookfield Multiplex

Tenants
- Gold Coast Blaze (NBL) (2007–2012); Queensland Firebirds (ANZ/NNL) (2008–2017); AFL draft (2010, 2012–2014)

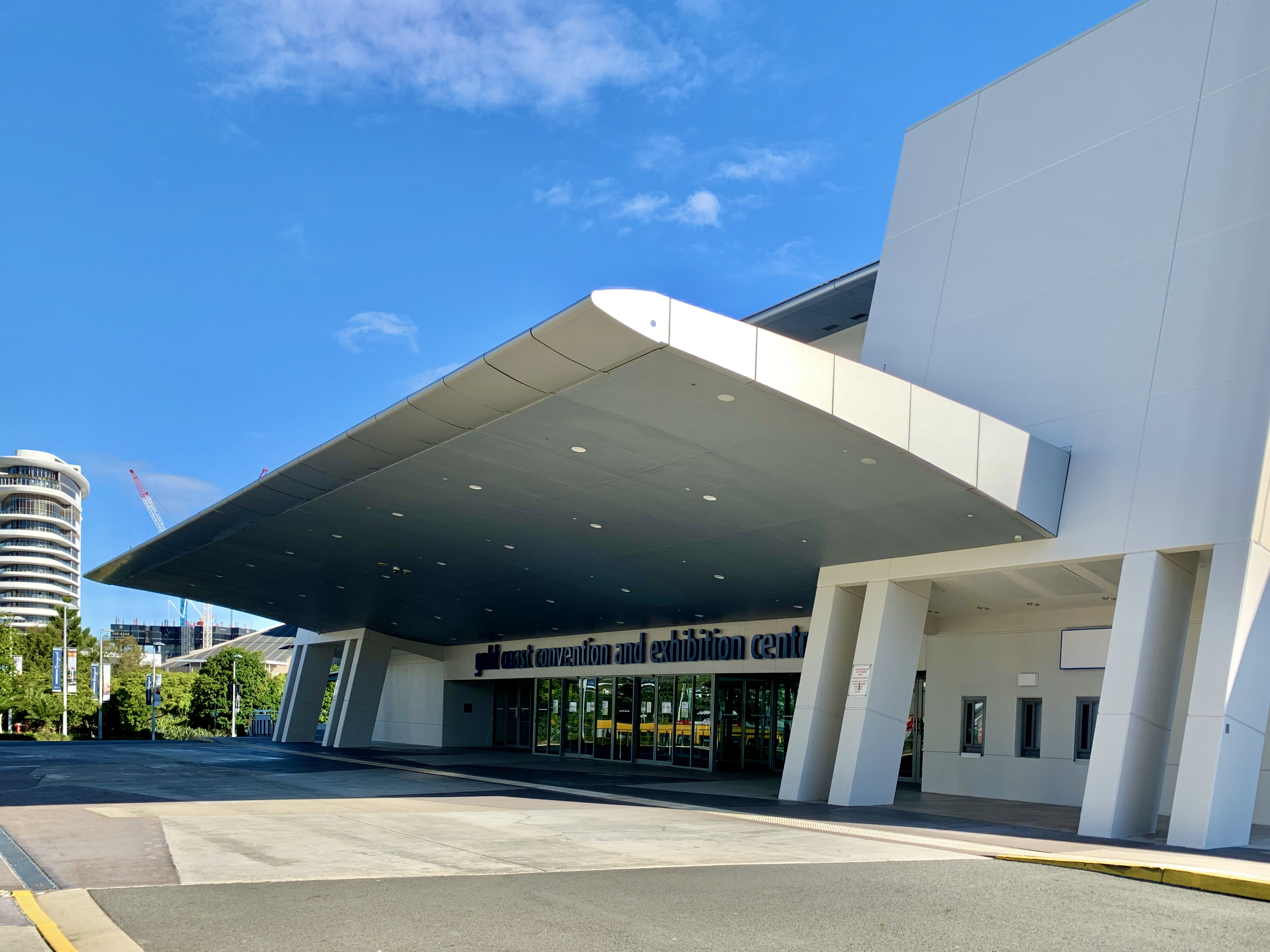
GCCEC main entrance (June 2020)

The Gold Coast Convention and Exhibition Centre (GCCEC) is located on the Gold Coast Highway in Broadbeach, Queensland, Australia. The venue was opened on 29 June 2004 at a cost of A$167 million. It is linked by a covered walkway to The Star Gold Coast. The convention centre is managed by the Star Entertainment Group, which is a subsidiary of Bally's Corporation. The venue caters for up to 6,000 people.

== Expansion ==
The centre was expanded at a cost of $40 million in early 2009. The makeover was funded by the Queensland Government, adding two extra exhibition halls, a registration office, three meeting rooms, three new kitchens and an extra 3,000 square metres of floor space in total. The Queensland Government commenced construction proceedings as a result of the increasing demand on the Gold Coast for larger space and concurrent sessions during national and international conventions and incentives. The final product required over 124,000 man-hours, 1,550 m^{3} (2,030 yd^{3}) of concrete poured, 375 t (413 tons) of structural steel erected and 7,000 L (1,500 imp gal; 1,800 US gal) of paint.

== Events ==
The GCCEC is home to numerous conventions, from the association, corporate and franchise sectors to consumer shows and entertainment events.

=== Sports ===
From the 2007–08 NBL season until the end of the 2011–12 season, the venue was home to the Gold Coast Blaze of the National Basketball League with the capacity to seat 5,269 spectators. During Blaze home games, the Centre was referred to as "The Furnace" and gained a reputation for having close games with three of the games during the 2010–11 NBL season going into overtime. Along with the Brisbane Convention & Exhibition Centre and the Queensland Firebirds, a Brisbane-based netball team in the Suncorp Super Netball played occasional home games at the venue until 2018.

In 2007, the Professional Bull Riders (PBR) hosted its first-ever World Cup event at the GCCEC, pitting 5 nations of bull riders against each other in a team format; the event was won by team Brazil.

The Centre hosted the Netball competition at the 2018 Commonwealth Games which were held on the Gold Coast, as well as hosting the accredited media centre for the event.

On 22 February 2026, the venue hosted the first ever NBL Ignite Cup Final. The game was a sell-out, with 5,000 tickets sold.

The venue will host volleyball and weightlifting during the 2032 Summer Olympics, and will also be used for powerlifting and sitting volleyball during the 2032 Summer Paralympics.

=== Entertainment ===
The convention centre was also home to the 12th Congress of APSR in 2007 held between 30 November – 4 December 2007.

In 2012, GCCEC played host to the Gold Coast judges' audition in the third series of Seven Network's The X Factor and the UFC on FX: Sotiropoulos vs. Pearson bout – the first of its kind to be held in Queensland.

In October 2017, EB Games Expo was held there, with Regurgitator playing a concert playing their album Unit in full at the expo, the day before the event.

On 8 and 9 February 2019, it hosted the Eurovision 2019 Australia Decides contest, the first venue for the contest. The centre once again hosted the contest a year later in 2020.

In December 2019, the Gold Coast Convention Centre was meant to host the first Eurovision Asia Song Contest, however due to production issues the contest had been cancelled.

== Awards ==
The GCCEC has won more than 20 awards over the past decade, including winner of the 2012 Meetings and Events Industry Awards – National Meeting Venue 500 Delegates or More and 2010 Meetings and Business Tourism Category at the Qantas Australian Tourism Awards.

== See also ==
- Sports on the Gold Coast, Queensland
