= Gold Coast Blaze =

Defunct basketball team from Broadbeach, Australia

- Leagues: NBL
- Founded: November 2006
- Dissolved: July 2012
- History: Gold Coast Blaze; 2007–2012
- Arena: The Furnace; Gold Coast Convention and Exhibition Centre
- Capacity: 5,269
- Location: Broadbeach, Gold Coast, Queensland
- Team colors: Blue, orange, black, white
- Championships: 0
Home	Away

The Gold Coast Blaze were an Australian men's professional basketball team which competed in the National Basketball League (NBL). The Blaze played five seasons in the NBL between 2007 and 2012, and played their home games at the Gold Coast Convention and Exhibition Centre on the Gold Coast in Queensland.

== History ==
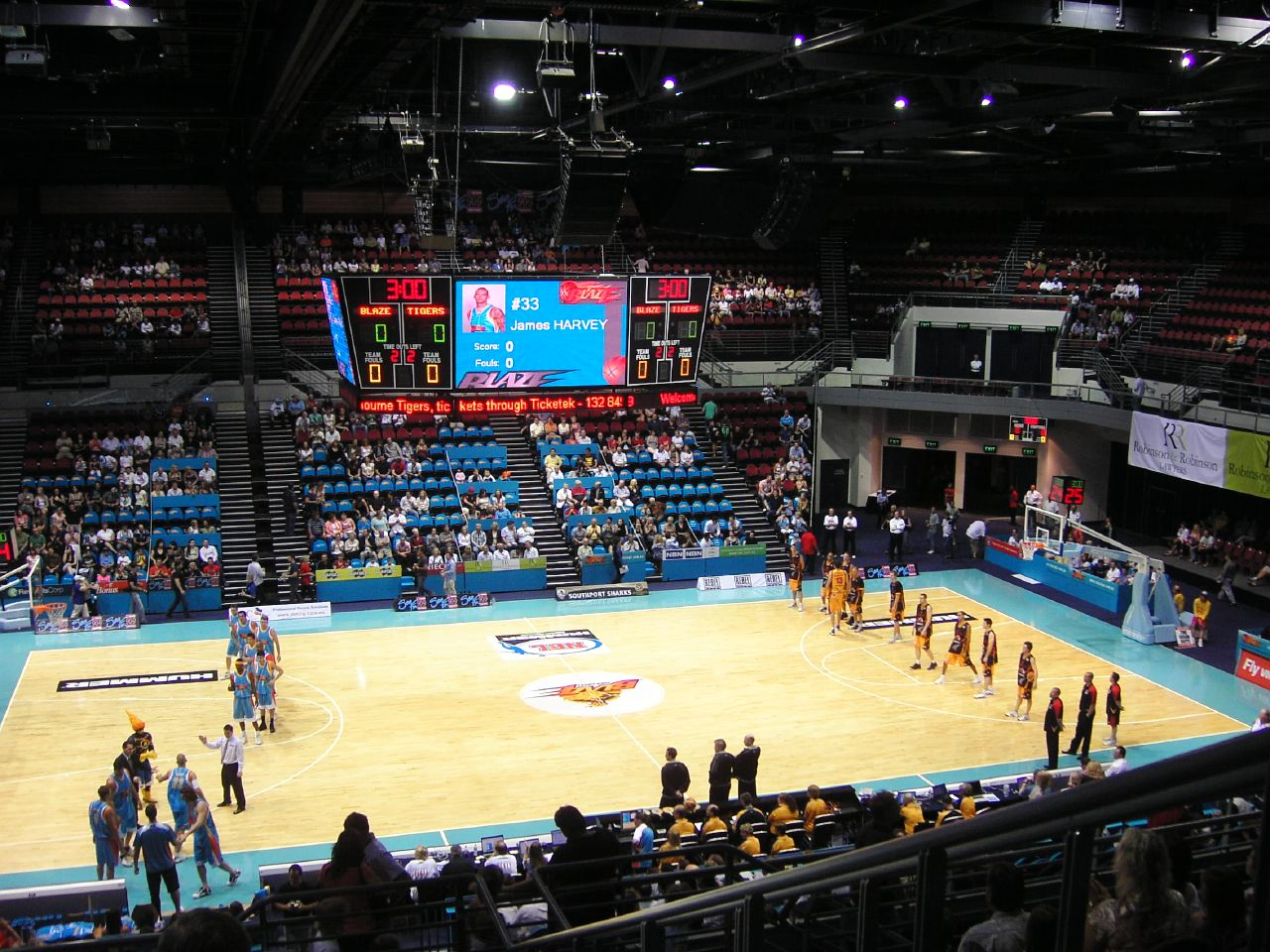
Gold Coast Blaze vs Melbourne Tigers, October 2007

In November 2006, the NBL announced a Gold Coast team would join the competition in the 2007–08 season after a licence was granted to a consortium headed by former Adelaide 36ers coach David Claxton. The franchise was initially owned by Claxton and local businessmen Tom Tate and Owen Tomlinson. It was announced that the team would play its home games at the Gold Coast Convention and Exhibition Centre.

In February 2007, the team name was revealed to be the Gold Coast Blaze. There had been a voting competition where 'Heat' had won as the preferred name, but it was not able to be considered following objections from the NBA and the Miami Heat.

Brendan Joyce was the team's inaugural head coach, while Scott McGregor, Juaquin Hawkins, Pero Cameron and Casey Frank were notable inaugural signings. The 2008–09 season saw Shane Heal join the Blaze.

In May 2012, the Blaze entered voluntary administration. They later joined forces with the Gold Coast Basketball Association and reverted to a community model. They reportedly received a $500,000 cash injection from a mystery fan.

On 17 July 2012, the Blaze were withdrawn from the NBL by owners, Owen and Ben Tomlinson. Basketball Australia had ordered the Tomlinsons to post a $1 million bank guarantee before granting them a licence for the 2012–13 season. The Tomlinsons, who had earlier declared they had secured the finances to operate in the 2012–13 season, had already reappointed staff when they were informed their submission would not be granted. Basketball Australia had given the owners until the end of the month to provide "irrefutable evidence" they could operate a team and repay their debts to the league; the Tomlinsons instead decided to withdraw from the league and dissolve the franchise.

== Notable former players ==
- (Australia) Jason Cadee 2 seasons: '10-'12
- (New Zealand) Pero Cameron 3 seasons: '07-'10
- (Dominican Republic) Adris Deleon 1 season: '11-'12
- (Australia) Tom Garlepp 2 seasons: '10-'12
- (Australia) Chris Goulding 3 seasons: '09-'12
- (Australia) Shane Heal 1 season: '08-'09
- (Australia) Ater Majok 1 season: '11-'11
- (Australia) Scott McGregor 2 seasons: '07-'09
- (Australia) Anthony Petrie 3 seasons: '09-'12
- (United States) Luke Whitehead 2 seasons: '07-'09
- (Australia) Mark Worthington 2 seasons: '10-'12

== Honour roll ==
NBL Championships:	0
NBL Finals Appearances:	3 (2007/08, 2009/10, 2011/12)
NBL Grand Final appearances:	0
NBL Most Valuable Players:	None
NBL Grand Final MVPs:	None
All-NBL First Team:	Mark Worthington (2011/12)
All-NBL Second Team:	James Harvey (2007/08), Adam Gibson (2009/10, 2010/11, 2011/12), Anthony Petrie (2009/10), Ayinde Ubaka (2009/10), Ira Clark (2010/11)
All-NBL Third Team:	James Harvey (2008/09), Adris Deleon (2011/12)
NBL Coach of the Year:	None
NBL Rookie of the Year:	None
NBL Most Improved Player:	Anthony Petrie (2009/10)
NBL Best Defensive Player:	None
NBL Best Sixth Man:	Erron Maxey (2009/10)

== Season by season ==
NBL champions	League champions	Runners-up	Finals berth

Season	Tier	League	Regular season					Post-season	Head coach	Captain	Club MVP
Season	Tier	League	Finish	Played	Wins	Losses	Win %	Post-season	Head coach	Captain	Club MVP
Gold Coast Blaze
2007–08	1	NBL	8th	30	15	15	.500	Lost elimination final (Townsville) 89–97	Brendan Joyce	Pero Cameron; James Harvey; Scott McGregor	James Harvey
2008–09	1	NBL	10th	30	8	22	.267	Did not qualify	Brendan Joyce	James Harvey	Luke Whitehead
2009–10	1	NBL	4th	28	16	12	.571	Lost semifinals (Perth) 0–2	Joey Wright	James Harvey	Adam Gibson
2010–11	1	NBL	6th	28	13	15	.464	Did not qualify	Joey Wright	Adam Gibson	Joe Ira Clark
2011–12	1	NBL	3rd	28	17	11	.607	Lost semifinals (Perth) 1–2	Joey Wright	Adam Gibson	Adris Deleon
Regular season record				144	69	75	.479	0 regular season champions			
Finals record				6	1	5	.167	0 NBL championships			

As of the end of the 2011–12 season

== See also ==
- Sports on the Gold Coast, Queensland
