= 2010–11 NBL season =

Professional basketball season

- League: National Basketball League
- Season: 2010–11
- Dates: 15 October 2010 – 29 April 2011
- Teams: 9
- TV partners: Australia: Network Ten; One HD; New Zealand: Sky Sport

Regular season
- Season champions: New Zealand Breakers
- Season MVP: (United States) Gary Ervin (Wollongong)

Finals
- Champions: New Zealand Breakers (1st title)
- Runners-up: Cairns Taipans
- Semifinalists: Townsville Crocodiles; Perth Wildcats
- Finals MVP: Thomas Abercrombie (New Zealand)

Statistical leaders
Points	Kirk Penney (New Zealand)	20.1
Rebounds	(Australia) Julian Khazzouh (Sydney)	10.0
Assists	(United States) Corey Williams (Melbourne)	6.1

NBL seasons
- ← 2009–10 2011–12 →

The 2010–11 NBL season was the 33rd season of competition since its establishment in 1979. A total of nine teams contested the league. The regular season was played between October 2010 and April 2011, followed by a post-season involving the top four. On 23 February 2010, it was announced that the Sydney Kings would return in 2010–11. The schedule was announced on 27 May 2010.

Broadcast rights during the off-season reverted from subscription channel Fox Sports to free-to-air network Channel Ten and its digital sports sister station One HD in a five-year deal, through to the 2014–15 season. In New Zealand, Sky Sport once again provided coverage, replacing Maori TV.

On 13 September 2010, iiNet was announced as the league naming rights sponsor and Centrebet as the official sports betting partner. Spalding provide equipment including the official game ball, with AND1 supplying team apparel.

== Preseason ==
NBL Top End Challenge, a round robin competition with a final series, involving all nine sides, will begin on 28 September in Alice Springs and continue in Darwin, Northern Territory from 30 September. Wollongong Hawks are defending pre-season champions.

=== Melbourne Tigers pre-season ===
5 August 2010	England	55–73	Melbourne Tigers	Belfast, United Kingdom

10 September 2010	Melbourne Tigers	105–95	Wollongong Hawks	Traralgon Sports Stadium, Traralgon

12 September 2010	Melbourne Tigers	88–78	Wollongong Hawks	Kilsyth Sports Centre, Melbourne

5 October 2010	Xinjiang Flying Tigers	59–75	Melbourne Tigers	China

6 October 2010	Beijing Ducks	vs.	Melbourne Tigers	China

=== Belfast International Basketball Classic ===
6 August 2010	Melbourne Tigers	76–92	University of Pittsburgh	Odyssey Arena, Belfast, United Kingdom
				Attendance: 3,309

7 August 2010	Melbourne Tigers	106–74	USNI All-Stars	Odyssey Arena, Belfast, United Kingdom

=== Lu'An Invitational ===
==== Group stage ====
10 August 2010	Melbourne Tigers	vs.	Shanghai Sharks	Changzhi, China

11 August 2010	Liaoning Dinosaurs	87–97 (OT)	New Zealand Breakers	Changzhi, China

12 August 2010	CB Axarquía	92–98 (OT)	Melbourne Tigers	Changzhi, China

12 August 2010	New Zealand Breakers	87–76	TGBTG	Changzhi, China

==== Semi-finals ====
13 August 2010	CB Axarquía	73–75	New Zealand Breakers	Changzhi, China

13 August 2010	Melbourne Tigers	vs.	TGBTG	Changzhi, China

==== Third-place playoff ====
14 August 2010	CB Axarquía	vs.	Melbourne Tigers	Changzhi, China

==== Final ====
14 August 2010	New Zealand Breakers	69–67	TGBTG	Changzhi, China

New Zealand Breakers win Lu'An Invitational.

=== Wollongong Hawks pre-season ===
20 August 2010	Wollongong Hawks	84–63	University of Hartford	Illawarra Basketball Stadium, Wollongong

3 September 2010	Wollongong Hawks	86–80	Sydney Kings	Illawarra Basketball Stadium, Wollongong

=== Sydney Kings pre-season ===
21 August 2010	Sydney Kings	111–60	University of Hartford	Alexandria Basketball Stadium, Sydney

28 August 2010	Maitland Mustangs	74–82	Sydney Kings	Maitland Basketball Stadium, Maitland

11 September 2010	Sydney Kings	111–77	Carfino All Stars	Bridgecoast Stadium, Terrigal

23 September 2010	Hoopdreamz Jets	74–94	Sydney Kings	Kevin Betts Stadium, Mt Druitt

28 September 2010	Sydney Kings	65–63	New Zealand Breakers	The Brickpit Sports Stadium, Hornsby

=== Perth Wildcats pre-season ===
24 August 2010	Perth Wildcats	100–95	Lakeside Lightning	Waroona Recreation Centre, Waroona

26 August 2010	Perth Wildcats	81–72	Lakeside Lightning	Lakeside Recreation Centre, Perth

28 August 2010	Perth Wildcats	74–73	Lakeside Lightning	Joondalup Basketball Stadium, Perth

=== Gold Coast Blaze pre-season ===
26 August 2010	Gold Coast Blaze	97–50	University of Hartford	Carrara Indoor Stadium, Gold Coast

5 September 2010	Gold Coast Blaze	98–81	Anyang Kites	Logan Sports Centre, Logan

18 September 2010	Gold Coast Blaze	58–92	Cairns Taipans	Carrara Indoor Stadium, Gold Coast

4 October 2010	Gold Coast Blaze	53–67	New Zealand Breakers	Carrara Indoor Stadium, Gold Coast

=== Cairns Taipans pre-season ===
5 September 2010	Cairns Taipans	76–79	Townsville Crocodiles	Bendigo Bank Basketball Stadium, Cairns

8 October 2010	Cairns Taipans	103–67	Gold Coast Blaze	Bendigo Bank Basketball Stadium, Cairns

=== Adelaide 36ers pre-season ===
9 September 2010	Adelaide 36ers	87–86	Townsville Crocodiles	Adelaide Arena, Adelaide
				Attendance: 2,294

10 September 2010	Adelaide 36ers	79–82	Townsville Crocodiles	Mount Barker

17 September 2010	Adelaide 36ers	80–79	Wollongong Hawks	Whyalla Basketball Stadium, Whyalla

19 September 2010	Adelaide 36ers	89–84	Wollongong Hawks	STARplex Gawler, Adelaide

=== Townsville Crocodiles pre-season ===
16 September 2010	Townsville Crocodiles	68–79	Cairns Taipans	NPA Stadium, Townsville

23 September 2010	Townsville Crocodiles	76–79	Gold Coast Blaze	NPA Stadium, Townsville

25 September 2010	Townsville Crocodiles	74–80	Gold Coast Blaze	Mackay Basketball Stadium, Mackay

=== Friendship Games ===
17 September 2010	Sydney Kings	73–69	Beijing Ducks	WA Basketball Centre, Perth

17 September 2010	Perth Wildcats	95–52	Shanghai Sharks	WA Basketball Centre, Perth

18 September 2010	Sydney Kings	106–49	Shanghai Sharks	WA Basketball Centre, Perth

18 September 2010	Perth Wildcats	98–56	Beijing Ducks	WA Basketball Centre, Perth

19 September 2010	Perth Wildcats	89–80	Sydney Kings	WA Basketball Centre, Perth

=== NBL Top End Challenge ===
28 September 2010	Adelaide 36ers	90–92	Perth Wildcats	Alice Springs Basketball Stadium, Alice Springs

30 September 2010	Cairns Taipans	83–75	Wollongong Hawks	Marrara Indoor Stadium, Darwin

30 September 2010	New Zealand Breakers	100–86	Townsville Crocodiles	Marrara Indoor Stadium, Darwin

30 September 2010	Adelaide 36ers	90–99	Melbourne Tigers	Marrara Indoor Stadium, Darwin

30 September 2010	Gold Coast Blaze	77–83	Sydney Kings	Marrara Indoor Stadium, Darwin

1 October 2010	Sydney Kings	74–82	Townsville Crocodiles	Marrara Indoor Stadium, Darwin

1 October 2010	Cairns Taipans	75–77	Gold Coast Blaze	Marrara Indoor Stadium, Darwin

1 October 2010	New Zealand Breakers	82–90	Wollongong Hawks	Marrara Indoor Stadium, Darwin

1 October 2010	Melbourne Tigers	81–97	Perth Wildcats	Marrara Indoor Stadium, Darwin

2 October 2010	Townsville Crocodiles	74–88	Melbourne Tigers	Marrara Indoor Stadium, Darwin

2 October 2010	Sydney Kings	80–70	Gold Coast Blaze	Marrara Indoor Stadium, Darwin

2 October 2010	New Zealand Breakers	72–64	Wollongong Hawks	Marrara Indoor Stadium, Darwin

2 October 2010	Adelaide 36ers	98–55	Darwin All-Stars	Marrara Indoor Stadium, Darwin

2 October 2010	Perth Wildcats	72–52	Cairns Taipans	Marrara Indoor Stadium, Darwin

Perth Wildcats win Top End Challenge.

=== New Zealand Breakers pre-season ===
10 October 2010	New Zealand Breakers	98–53	NZNBL Invitational	North Shore Events Centre, Auckland

== Regular season ==
The 2010–11 regular season took place over 25 rounds between 28 October 2010 and 2 April 2011.

=== Round 1 ===
Date	Home	Score	Away	Venue	Crowd	Boxscore
15/10/2010	Wollongong Hawks	83–77	Gold Coast Blaze	WIN Entertainment Centre	3,302	boxscore
15/10/2010	Melbourne Tigers	68–84	Sydney Kings	State Netball and Hockey Centre	3,091	boxscore
16/10/2010	Townsville Crocodiles	79–70	Cairns Taipans	Townsville Entertainment Centre	4,201	boxscore
16/10/2010	Sydney Kings	70–83	New Zealand Breakers	Sydney Entertainment Centre	8,533	boxscore
17/10/2010	Adelaide 36ers	74–69	Perth Wildcats	Adelaide Arena	5,021	boxscore

=== Round 2 ===
Date	Home	Score	Away	Venue	Crowd	Boxscore
20/10/2010	New Zealand Breakers	96–94	Perth Wildcats	North Shore Events Centre	2,280	boxscore
22/10/2010	Wollongong Hawks	71–70	Townsville Crocodiles	WIN Entertainment Centre	3,367	boxscore
23/10/2010	Cairns Taipans	85–74	Adelaide 36ers	Cairns Convention Centre	4,250	boxscore
24/10/2010	Gold Coast Blaze	94–90	Townsville Crocodiles	Gold Coast Convention Centre	3,429	boxscore
24/10/2010	Melbourne Tigers	66–91	Perth Wildcats	State Netball and Hockey Centre	2,837	boxscore

=== Round 3 ===
Date	Home	Score	Away	Venue	Crowd	Boxscore
28/10/2010	New Zealand Breakers	84–79	Melbourne Tigers	North Shore Events Centre	2,428	boxscore
29/10/2010	Gold Coast Blaze	92–81	Cairns Taipans	Gold Coast Convention Centre	2,946	boxscore
29/10/2010	Perth Wildcats	87–84	Wollongong Hawks	Challenge Stadium	4,200	boxscore
30/10/2010	Townsville Crocodiles	80–79	Sydney Kings	Townsville Entertainment Centre	3,956	boxscore
31/10/2010	Adelaide 36ers	82–96	Wollongong Hawks	Adelaide Arena	4,519	boxscore

=== Round 4 ===
Date	Home	Score	Away	Venue	Crowd	Boxscore
5/11/2010	Townsville Crocodiles	85–91	Perth Wildcats	Townsville Entertainment Centre	3,364	boxscore
6/11/2010	Gold Coast Blaze	81–96	New Zealand Breakers	Gold Coast Convention Centre	3,871	boxscore
6/11/2010	Cairns Taipans	86–69	Perth Wildcats	Cairns Convention Centre	4,070	boxscore
6/11/2010	Adelaide 36ers	87–75	Sydney Kings	Adelaide Arena	4,620	boxscore
7/11/2010	Melbourne Tigers	82–86	Wollongong Hawks	State Netball and Hockey Centre	2,821	boxscore

=== Round 5 ===
Date	Home	Score	Away	Venue	Crowd	Boxscore
12/11/2010	Adelaide 36ers	78–82	New Zealand Breakers	Adelaide Arena	5,430	boxscore
13/11/2010	Sydney Kings	59–64	Townsville Crocodiles	Sydney Entertainment Centre	5,586	boxscore
13/11/2010	Cairns Taipans	96–76	Gold Coast Blaze	Cairns Convention Centre	4,007	boxscore
14/11/2010	Wollongong Hawks	93–82	Melbourne Tigers	WIN Entertainment Centre	3,537	boxscore
14/11/2010	Perth Wildcats	114–74	New Zealand Breakers	Challenge Stadium	4,200	boxscore

=== Round 6 ===
Date	Home	Score	Away	Venue	Crowd	Boxscore
19/11/2010	New Zealand Breakers	57–73	Wollongong Hawks	North Shore Events Centre	3,800	boxscore
19/11/2010	Melbourne Tigers	84–93	Perth Wildcats	State Netball and Hockey Centre	3,000	boxscore
20/11/2010	Cairns Taipans	87–71	Adelaide 36ers	Cairns Convention Centre	4,920	boxscore
21/11/2010	Townsville Crocodiles	77–73	Adelaide 36ers	Townsville Entertainment Centre	4,021	boxscore
21/11/2010	Gold Coast Blaze	82–85	Melbourne Tigers	Gold Coast Convention Centre	3,164	boxscore

=== Round 7 ===
Date	Home	Score	Away	Venue	Crowd	Boxscore
25/11/2020	New Zealand Breakers	100–79	Gold Coast Blaze	North Shore Events Centre	2,800	boxscore
26/11/2010	Wollongong Hawks	89–72	Sydney Kings	WIN Entertainment Centre	4,357	boxscore
26/11/2010	Townsville Crocodiles	94–66	Melbourne Tigers	Townsville Entertainment Centre	3,791	boxscore
28/11/2010	Perth Wildcats	64–72	Cairns Taipans	Challenge Stadium	4,000	boxscore

=== Round 8 ===
Date	Home	Score	Away	Venue	Crowd	Boxscore
3/12/2010	Gold Coast Blaze	85–68	Sydney Kings	Gold Coast Convention Centre	2,700	boxscore
3/12/2010	Adelaide 36ers	92–79	Townsville Crocodiles	Adelaide Arena	4,595	boxscore
4/12/2010	Cairns Taipans	80–62	Wollongong Hawks	Cairns Convention Centre	4,625	boxscore
4/12/2010	Melbourne Tigers	82–78	Gold Coast Blaze	State Netball and Hockey Centre	2,400	boxscore
5/12/2010	Sydney Kings	80–94	New Zealand Breakers	Sydney Entertainment Centre	4,327	boxscore
5/12/2010	Perth Wildcats	90–64	Townsville Crocodiles	Challenge Stadium	4,000	boxscore

=== Round 9 ===
Date	Home	Score	Away	Venue	Crowd	Boxscore
9/12/2010	New Zealand Breakers	93–79	Cairns Taipans	North Shore Events Centre	3,600	boxscore
10/12/2010	Wollongong Hawks	81–79	Adelaide 36ers	WIN Entertainment Centre	3,245	boxscore
11/12/2010	Townsville Crocodiles	91–86	Gold Coast Blaze	Townsville Entertainment Centre	3,527	boxscore
12/12/2010	Sydney Kings	80–95	Wollongong Hawks	Sydney Entertainment Centre	3,685	boxscore
12/12/2010	Perth Wildcats	87–76	Melbourne Tigers	Challenge Stadium	4,000	boxscore

=== Round 10 ===
Date	Home	Score	Away	Venue	Crowd	Boxscore
17/12/2010	Gold Coast Blaze	93–81	Townsville Crocodiles	Gold Coast Convention Centre	2,500	boxscore
17/12/2010	Wollongong Hawks	85–89	New Zealand Breakers	WIN Entertainment Centre	3,367	boxscore
17/12/2010	Adelaide 36ers	81–77	Sydney Kings	Adelaide Arena	4,619	boxscore
18/12/2010	Melbourne Tigers	80–90	New Zealand Breakers	State Netball and Hockey Centre	3,356	boxscore
18/12/2010	Cairns Taipans	56–51	Townsville Crocodiles	Cairns Convention Centre	5,027	boxscore
19/12/2010	Perth Wildcats	87–84	Sydney Kings	Challenge Stadium	4,000	boxscore

=== Round 11 ===
Date	Home	Score	Away	Venue	Crowd	Boxscore
23/12/2010	Wollongong Hawks	70–72	Gold Coast Blaze	WIN Entertainment Centre	3,386	boxscore
23/12/2010	Sydney Kings	73–82	Melbourne Tigers	Sydney Entertainment Centre	3,875	boxscore
23/12/2010	Adelaide 36ers	97–99	Townsville Crocodiles	Adelaide Arena	4,465	boxscore

=== Round 12 ===
Date	Home	Score	Away	Venue	Crowd	Boxscore
29/12/2010	Sydney Kings	78–91	Perth Wildcats	Sydney Entertainment Centre	4,932	boxscore
31/12/2010	Cairns Taipans	60–48	Sydney Kings	Cairns Convention Centre	5,300	boxscore
31/12/2010	Gold Coast Blaze	93–96	Perth Wildcats	Gold Coast Convention Centre	4,477	boxscore
31/12/2010	Townsville Crocodiles	96–79	New Zealand Breakers	Townsville Entertainment Centre	4,610	boxscore
31/12/2010	Adelaide 36ers	98–83	Wollongong Hawks	Adelaide Arena	4,728	boxscore
2/01/2011	Melbourne Tigers	87–66	Adelaide 36ers	State Netball and Hockey Centre	3,300	boxscore

=== Round 13 ===
Date	Home	Score	Away	Venue	Crowd	Boxscore
7/01/2011	Cairns Taipans	86–82	Gold Coast Blaze	Cairns Convention Centre	4,317	boxscore
7/01/2011	Perth Wildcats	86–93	Melbourne Tigers	Challenge Stadium	4,000	boxscore
8/01/2011	Sydney Kings	73–80	Townsville Crocodiles	Sydney Entertainment Centre	4,532	boxscore
8/01/2011	Adelaide 36ers	85–90	New Zealand Breakers	Adelaide Arena	5,261	boxscore
9/01/2011	Gold Coast Blaze	87–86	Wollongong Hawks	Gold Coast Convention Centre	4,170	boxscore

=== Round 14 ===
Date	Home	Score	Away	Venue	Crowd	Boxscore
13/01/2011	New Zealand Breakers	94–88	Cairns Taipans	North Shore Events Centre	4,148	boxscore
14/01/2011	Townsville Crocodiles	94–78	Melbourne Tigers	Townsville Entertainment Centre	4,271	boxscore
14/01/2011	Perth Wildcats	92–58	Wollongong Hawks	Challenge Stadium	4,000	boxscore
15/01/2011	Cairns Taipans	95–74	Melbourne Tigers	Cairns Convention Centre	4,759	boxscore
16/01/2011	Adelaide 36ers	90–83	Gold Coast Blaze	Adelaide Arena	N/A	boxscore

=== Round 15 ===
Date	Home	Score	Away	Venue	Crowd	Boxscore
19/01/2011	Gold Coast Blaze	90–85	Cairns Taipans	Gold Coast Convention Centre	N/A	boxscore
20/01/2011	New Zealand Breakers	91–77	Adelaide 36ers	North Shore Events Centre	N/A	boxscore
21/01/2011	Sydney Kings	81–71	Wollongong Hawks	Sydney Entertainment Centre	5,189	boxscore
21/01/2011	Perth Wildcats	88–68	Townsville Crocodiles	Challenge Stadium	4,200	boxscore
22/01/2011	Melbourne Tigers	83–76	Cairns Taipans	State Netball and Hockey Centre	N/A	boxscore
23/01/2011	Adelaide 36ers	77–76	Perth Wildcats	Adelaide Arena	N/A	boxscore

=== Round 16 ===
Date	Home	Score	Away	Venue	Crowd	Boxscore
26/01/2011	Melbourne Tigers	67–85	Sydney Kings	State Netball and Hockey Centre	N/A	boxscore
28/01/2011	Townsville Crocodiles	71–62	Gold Coast Blaze	Townsville Entertainment Centre	3,612	boxscore
28/01/2011	Wollongong Hawks	86–97	Cairns Taipans	WIN Entertainment Centre	3,632	boxscore
29/01/2011	Perth Wildcats	65–66	Adelaide 36ers	Challenge Stadium	4,000	boxscore
30/01/2011	Cairns Taipans	74–77	New Zealand Breakers	Cairns Convention Centre	5,019	boxscore
30/01/2011	Gold Coast Blaze	94–91	Sydney Kings	Gold Coast Convention Centre	N/A	boxscore

=== Round 17 ===
Date	Home	Score	Away	Venue	Crowd	Boxscore
3/02/2011	New Zealand Breakers	80–76	Wollongong Hawks	North Shore Events Centre	N/A	boxscore
4/02/2011	Sydney Kings	99–90	Adelaide 36ers	Sydney Entertainment Centre	5,278	boxscore
6/02/2011	Melbourne Tigers	93–72	Wollongong Hawks	State Netball and Hockey Centre	N/A	boxscore
6/02/2011	Perth Wildcats	75–78	Gold Coast Blaze	Challenge Stadium	4,000	boxscore

=== Round 18 ===
Date	Home	Score	Away	Venue	Crowd	Boxscore
11/02/2011	New Zealand Breakers	101–91	Melbourne Tigers	North Shore Events Centre	N/A	boxscore
11/02/2011	Sydney Kings	84–98	Perth Wildcats	Sydney Entertainment Centre	N/A	boxscore
12/02/2011	Wollongong Hawks	105–73	Perth Wildcats	WIN Entertainment Centre	3,431	boxscore
13/02/2011	Gold Coast Blaze	95–79	Adelaide 36ers	Gold Coast Convention Centre	3,074	boxscore
13/02/2011	Townsville Crocodiles	81–74	Cairns Taipans	Townsville Entertainment Centre	3,965	boxscore

=== Round 19 ===
Date	Home	Score	Away	Venue	Crowd	Boxscore
17/02/2011	New Zealand Breakers	82–79	Perth Wildcats	North Shore Events Centre	2,634	boxscore
18/02/2011	Townsville Crocodiles	75–56	Wollongong Hawks	Townsville Entertainment Centre	3,586	boxscore
18/02/2011	Sydney Kings	81–69	Cairns Taipans	Sydney Entertainment Centre	4,853	boxscore
18/02/2011	Adelaide 36ers	83–86	Melbourne Tigers	Adelaide Arena	N/A	boxscore
19/02/2011	Melbourne Tigers	70–63	Cairns Taipans	State Netball and Hockey Centre	N/A	boxscore
20/02/2011	Gold Coast Blaze	115–123	New Zealand Breakers	Gold Coast Convention Centre	N/A	boxscore
20/02/2011	Perth Wildcats	82–62	Adelaide 36ers	Challenge Stadium	4,000	boxscore

=== Round 20 ===
Date	Home	Score	Away	Venue	Crowd	Boxscore
23/02/2011	New Zealand Breakers	91–94	Gold Coast Blaze	North Shore Events Centre	N/A	boxscore
25/02/2011	Cairns Taipans	75–76	Sydney Kings	Cairns Convention Centre	4,514	boxscore
26/02/2011	Townsville Crocodiles	96–68	Sydney Kings	Townsville Entertainment Centre	4,142	boxscore
27/02/2011	Wollongong Hawks	104–81	New Zealand Breakers	WIN Entertainment Centre	3,112	boxscore

=== Round 21 ===
Date	Home	Score	Away	Venue	Crowd	Boxscore
3/03/2011	New Zealand Breakers	66–65	Townsville Crocodiles	North Shore Events Centre	N/A	boxscore
4/03/2011	Adelaide 36ers	70–75	Cairns Taipans	Adelaide Arena	5,184	boxscore
5/03/2011	Wollongong Hawks	87–77	Townsville Crocodiles	WIN Entertainment Centre	3,112	boxscore
6/03/2011	Sydney Kings	95–86	Melbourne Tigers	Sydney Entertainment Centre	5,210	boxscore
6/03/2011	Perth Wildcats	83–60	Cairns Taipans	Challenge Stadium	4,000	boxscore

=== Round 22 ===
Date	Home	Score	Away	Venue	Crowd	Boxscore
11/03/2011	Gold Coast Blaze	68–80	Wollongong Hawks	Gold Coast Convention Centre	3,518	boxscore
12/03/2011	Cairns Taipans	79–63	Melbourne Tigers	Cairns Convention Centre	N/A	boxscore
12/03/2011	Townsville Crocodiles	100–92	New Zealand Breakers	Townsville Entertainment Centre	4,086	boxscore
12/03/2011	Wollongong Hawks	87–60	Adelaide 36ers	WIN Entertainment Centre	3,318	boxscore
13/03/2011	Sydney Kings	76–72	Adelaide 36ers	Sydney Entertainment Centre	6,132	boxscore
13/03/2011	Perth Wildcats	102–81	Gold Coast Blaze	Challenge Stadium	4,000	boxscore

=== Round 23 ===
Date	Home	Score	Away	Venue	Crowd	Boxscore
17/03/2011	New Zealand Breakers	91–86	Sydney Kings	North Shore Events Centre	N/A	boxscore
18/03/2011	Adelaide 36ers	76–79	Melbourne Tigers	Adelaide Arena	4,932	boxscore
18/03/2011	Townsville Crocodiles	72–71	Perth Wildcats	Townsville Entertainment Centre	4,404	boxscore
19/03/2011	Wollongong Hawks	67–68	Cairns Taipans	WIN Entertainment Centre	3,780	boxscore
20/03/2011	Melbourne Tigers	81–82	Gold Coast Blaze	State Netball and Hockey Centre	3,000	boxscore

=== Round 24 ===
Date	Home	Score	Away	Venue	Crowd	Boxscore
25/03/2011	Gold Coast Blaze	101–102	Adelaide 36ers	Gold Coast Convention Centre	3,789	boxscore
26/03/2011	Cairns Taipans	90–87	Perth Wildcats	Cairns Convention Centre	5,067	boxscore
26/03/2011	Melbourne Tigers	72–82	Townsville Crocodiles	State Netball and Hockey Centre	3,164	boxscore
27/03/2011	Wollongong Hawks	86–70	Sydney Kings	WIN Entertainment Centre	3,867	boxscore

Cairns vs. Perth was moved from 4 February 2011 to 26 March 2011 due to Cyclone Yasi.

=== Round 25 ===
Date	Home	Score	Away	Venue	Crowd	Boxscore
30/03/2011	New Zealand Breakers	100–71	Adelaide 36ers	North Shore Events Centre	3,500	boxscore
1/04/2011	Cairns Taipans	80–64	Townsville Crocodiles	Cairns Convention Centre	5,250	boxscore
1/04/2011	Sydney Kings	79–96	Gold Coast Blaze	Sydney Entertainment Centre	9,535	boxscore
2/04/2011	Melbourne Tigers	74–87	New Zealand Breakers	State Netball and Hockey Centre	3,450	boxscore

== Ladder ==
Pos	2010–11 NBL season											
Pos	Team	Pld	W	L	PCT	Last 5	Streak	Home	Away	PF	PA	PP
1	New Zealand Breakers	28	22	6	78.57%	4–1	W3	12–2	10–4	2463	2367	104.06%
2	Townsville Crocodiles	28	17	11	60.71%	3–2	L1	13–1	4–10	2225	2163	102.87%
3	Cairns Taipans^{1}	28	16	12	57.14%	4–1	W4	12–2	4–10	2186	2107	103.75%
4	Perth Wildcats^{1}	28	16	12	57.14%	3–2	L2	10–4	6–8	2380	2192	108.58%
5	Wollongong Hawks	28	15	13	53.57%	4–1	W1	10–4	5–9	2272	2209	102.85%
6	Gold Coast Blaze	28	13	15	46.43%	2–3	W1	8–6	5–9	2396	2440	98.20%
7	Melbourne Tigers	28	10	18	35.71%	1–4	L3	5–9	5–9	2209	2357	93.72%
8	Adelaide 36ers	28	9	19	32.14%	1–4	L1	7–7	2–12	2212	2362	93.65%
9	Sydney Kings	28	8	20	28.57%	2–3	L3	5–9	3–11	2171	2317	93.70%

Updated to match(es) played on 2 April 2011. Source: NBL.com.au

The NBL tie-breaker system as outlined in the NBL Rules and Regulations states that in the case of an identical win–loss record, the results in games played between the teams will determine order of seeding.

^{1}Cairns Taipans won Head-to-Head (3-1).

=== Ladder Progression ===
- Numbers highlighted in green indicate that the team finished the round inside the top four.
- Numbers highlighted in blue indicates the team finished first on the ladder in that round.
- Numbers highlighted in red indicates the team finished last place on the ladder in that round.

2010–11 NBL season
Team	1	2	3	4	5	6	7	8	9	10	11	12	13	14	15	16	17	18	19	20	21	22	23	24	25
Adelaide 36ers	4	6	8	6	6	7	6	6	6	6	7	6	7	6	7	6	7	7	7	8	8	9	9	8	8
Cairns Taipans	8	4	7	3	3	3	3	3	3	3	2	2	2	2	3	3	2	4	3	4	4	5	4	4	4
Gold Coast Blaze	7	5	3	5	7	6	7	7	7	7	6	7	6	7	6	7	6	6	6	6	6	6	6	6	6
Melbourne Tigers	9	9	9	9	9	9	9	8	8	8	8	8	8	8	8	8	8	8	8	7	7	7	7	7	7
New Zealand Breakers	1	1	1	1	2	2	2	2	2	1	1	1	1	1	1	1	1	1	1	1	1	1	1	1	1
Perth Wildcats	6	7	4	4	4	4	5	4	4	4	4	3	3	3	2	2	3	3	4	3	2	2	3	3	3
Sydney Kings	5	3	6	8	8	8	8	9	9	9	9	9	9	9	9	9	9	9	9	9	9	8	8	9	9
Townsville Crocodiles	2	8	5	7	5	5	4	5	5	5	5	5	5	4	4	4	4	2	2	2	3	3	2	2	2
Wollongong Hawks	3	2	2	2	1	1	1	1	1	2	3	4	4	5	5	5	5	5	5	5	5	4	5	5	5

== Finals ==
The 2010–11 National Basketball League Finals will be played between 7 April 2011 and 29 April 2011, consisting of two best-of-three semi-final and final series, where the higher seed hosts the first and, if necessary, third game.

=== Playoff Seedings ===
1. New Zealand Breakers
2. Townsville Crocodiles
3. Cairns Taipans
4. Perth Wildcats

The NBL tie-breaker system as outlined in the NBL Rules and Regulations states that in the case of an identical win–loss record, the results in games played between the two teams will determine order of seeding.

Under that system, Cairns will finish third (3–1), and Perth fourth (1–3).

=== Playoff bracket ===
Semifinals
1	New Zealand Breakers	78	93	99
4	Perth Wildcats	101	89	83
2	Townsville Crocodiles	76	57	83
3	Cairns Taipans	73	74	93

Grand Final
1	New Zealand Breakers	85	81	71
3	Cairns Taipans	67	85	53

=== Semi-finals ===
Date	Home	Score	Away	Venue	Crowd	Boxscore
7/04/2011	New Zealand Breakers	78–101	Perth Wildcats	North Shore Events Centre	4,000	boxscore
8/04/2011	Townsville Crocodiles	76–73	Cairns Taipans	Townsville Entertainment Centre	4,234	boxscore
9/04/2011	Cairns Taipans	74–57	Townsville Crocodiles	Cairns Convention Centre	5,345	boxscore
10/04/2011	Perth Wildcats	89–93	New Zealand Breakers	Challenge Stadium	4,400	boxscore
13/04/2011	New Zealand Breakers	99–83	Perth Wildcats	North Shore Events Centre	4,148	boxscore
17/04/2011	Townsville Crocodiles	83–93	Cairns Taipans	Townsville Entertainment Centre	5,151	boxscore

=== Grand Final ===
Date	Home	Score	Away	Venue	Crowd	Boxscore
20/04/2011	New Zealand Breakers	85–67	Cairns Taipans	North Shore Events Centre	4,400	boxscore
24/04/2011	Cairns Taipans	85–81	New Zealand Breakers	Cairns Convention Centre	5,200	boxscore
29/04/2011	New Zealand Breakers	71–53	Cairns Taipans	North Shore Events Centre	4,400	boxscore

== Season statistics ==
=== Statistics leaders ===
Category	Player	Games played	Totals	Average
Points per game	Kirk Penney (New Zealand Breakers)	23	463	20.1
Rebounds per game	Julian Khazzouh (Sydney Kings)	26	271	10.0
Assists per game	Corey Williams (Melbourne Tigers)	23	140	6.1
Steals per game	Damian Martin (Perth Wildcats)	28	64	2.3
Blocks per game	Adam Ballinger (Adelaide 36ers)	26	50	1.9
Field goal percentage	Mika Vukona (New Zealand Breakers)	28	105–173	60.7%
Three-point field goal percentage	Russell Hinder (Townsville Crocodiles)	26	30–67	44.8%
Free throw percentage	Daryl Corletto (Melbourne Tigers)	28	27–28	96.4%

Note: regular season only

=== Top 10 Attendances ===
Attendance	Round	Date	Home	Score	Away	Venue
9,535	25	1/04/2011	Sydney Kings	79–96	Gold Coast Blaze	Sydney Entertainment Centre
8,533	1	16/10/2010	Sydney Kings	70–83	New Zealand Breakers	Sydney Entertainment Centre
6,132	22	13/03/2011	Sydney Kings	76–72	Adelaide 36ers	Sydney Entertainment Centre
5,586	5	13/11/2010	Sydney Kings	59–64	Townsville Crocodiles	Sydney Entertainment Centre
5,430	5	12/11/2010	Adelaide 36ers	78–82	New Zealand Breakers	Adelaide Arena
5,345	SF	9/04/2011	Cairns Taipans	74–57	Townsville Crocodiles	Cairns Convention Centre
5,300	12	31/12/2010	Cairns Taipans	60–48	Sydney Kings	Cairns Convention Centre
5,278	17	4/02/2011	Sydney Kings	99–90	Adelaide 36ers	Sydney Entertainment Centre
5,261	13	8/01/2011	Adelaide 36ers	85–90	New Zealand Breakers	Adelaide Arena
5,250	25	1/04/2011	Cairns Taipans	80–64	Townsville Crocodiles	Cairns Convention Centre

== Awards ==
=== Player of the Week ===
Round	Player	Team
1	Julian Khazzouh	Sydney Kings
2	Gary Ervin	Wollongong Hawks
3	Luke Schenscher	Townsville Crocodiles
4	Gary Wilkinson	New Zealand Breakers
5	Shawn Redhage	Perth Wildcats
6	Oscar Forman	Wollongong Hawks
7	Michael Cedar	Townsville Crocodiles
8	Corey Williams	Melbourne Tigers
9	Kirk Penney	New Zealand Breakers
10	Kirk Penney	New Zealand Breakers
11	Luke Schenscher	Townsville Crocodiles
12	Corey Williams	Melbourne Tigers
13	Mark Worthington	Gold Coast Blaze
14	Kirk Penney	New Zealand Breakers
15	Ira Clark	Gold Coast Blaze
16	Julian Khazzouh	Sydney Kings
17	Julian Khazzouh	Sydney Kings
18	Cameron Tragardh	Melbourne Tigers
19	Kirk Penney	New Zealand Breakers
20	Peter Crawford	Townsville Crocodiles
21	Matthew Knight	Perth Wildcats
22	Damian Martin	Perth Wildcats
23	Phill Jones	Cairns Taipans
24	Gary Ervin	Wollongong Hawks
25	Thomas Abercrombie	New Zealand Breakers

=== Player of the Month ===
Round	Player	Team
October	Gary Ervin	Wollongong Hawks
November	Gary Ervin	Wollongong Hawks
December	Kirk Penney	New Zealand Breakers
January	Gary Wilkinson	New Zealand Breakers
February	Kirk Penney	New Zealand Breakers
March	Damian Martin	Perth Wildcats

=== Coach of the Month ===
Round	Player	Team
October	Gordie McLeod	Wollongong Hawks
November	Gordie McLeod	Wollongong Hawks
December	Rob Beveridge	Perth Wildcats
January	Andrej Lemanis	New Zealand Breakers
February	Darryl McDonald	Melbourne Tigers
March	Aaron Fearne	Cairns Taipans

=== Season ===
The end-of-season awards ceremony was held in the Palladium Room at Crown Casino in Melbourne on Monday, 4 April 2011.

- Most Valuable Player (Andrew Gaze Trophy): Gary Ervin, Wollongong Hawks
- Rookie of the Year: Ben Madgen, Sydney Kings
- Best Defensive Player: Damian Martin, Perth Wildcats
- Best Sixth Man: Kevin Braswell, New Zealand Breakers
- Most Improved Player: Oscar Forman, Wollongong Hawks
- Coach of the Year (Lindsay Gaze Trophy): Trevor Gleeson, Townsville Crocodiles
- Referee of the Year: Michael Aylen
- All-NBL First Team:
  - Gary Ervin – Wollongong Hawks
  - Damian Martin – Perth Wildcats
  - Kirk Penney – New Zealand Breakers
  - Gary Wilkinson – New Zealand Breakers
  - Julian Khazzouh – Sydney Kings
- All-NBL Second Team:
  - Corey Williams – Melbourne Tigers
  - Adam Gibson – Gold Coast Blaze
  - Glen Saville – Wollongong Hawks
  - Ira Clark – Gold Coast Blaze
  - Luke Schenscher – Townsville Crocodiles
- All-NBL Third Team:
  - Ayinde Ubaka – Cairns Taipans
  - Peter Crawford – Townsville Crocodiles
  - Shawn Redhage – Perth Wildcats
  - Alex Loughton – Cairns Taipans
  - Adam Ballinger – Adelaide 36ers

=== Finals ===
- Grand Final Series MVP (Larry Sengstock Medal): Thomas Abercrombie, New Zealand Breakers
