= Oscar Forman =

Australian basketball player

Personal information
- Born: 16 January 1982 (age 44) Adelaide, South Australia, Australia
- Listed height: 206 cm (6 ft 9 in)
- Listed weight: 103 kg (227 lb)

Career information
- High school: Unley (Adelaide, South Australia)
- Playing career: 2000–present
- Position: Power forward / small forward

Career history
- 2000: Australian Institute of Sport
- 2001–2006: Sturt Sabres
- 2001–2006: Adelaide 36ers
- 2006–2010: New Zealand Breakers
- 2007–2008: Harbour Heat
- 2010–2018: Wollongong / Illawarra Hawks
- 2018: Hawke's Bay Hawks
- 2022: Illawarra Hawks (NBL1 East)

Career highlights
- NBL champion (2002); Central ABL champion (2002); NBL Most Improved Player (2011); NZNBL All-Star Five (2007); Central ABL Woollacott Medal (2005)

Oscar Forman (born 16 January 1982) is an Australian professional basketball player. He played 17 seasons in the Australian National Basketball League (NBL) between 2001 and 2018.

== Early life ==
Forman was born in Adelaide, South Australia. He attended Unley High School and played for the Sturt Sabres as a junior. He moved to Canberra in 2000 to attend the Australian Institute of Sport (AIS) and play for the AIS men's team in the South East Australian Basketball League.

== Professional career ==
Forman made his debut in the National Basketball League for the Adelaide 36ers during the 2001–02 season and was a member of the 36ers' championship team as a rookie. In the 2004–05 season, he led the league with a 47% three-point shooting percentage. His final season with the 36ers came in the 2005–06 season. During his time with the 36ers, he spent the off-seasons playing in the Central ABL with the Sturt Sabres. He won a championship with the Sabres in 2002 and won the Woollacott Medal in 2005.

For the 2006–07 NBL season, Forman joined the New Zealand Breakers. He played four seasons with the Breakers. During his time in New Zealand, he played for the Harbour Heat of the New Zealand NBL in 2007 and 2008.

For the 2010–11 NBL season, Forman joined the Wollongong Hawks. He played for Wollongong/Illawarra for the next eight seasons. In his first season with the Hawks, he was named the NBL's Most Improved Player. He played his 400th NBL game during the 2014–15 season and then reached 450 games during the 2015–16 season. He helped the Hawks reach the NBL Grand Final in the 2016–17 season. In December 2017, he became the 13th player to reach 500 NBL games.

Following the 2017–18 season, Forman retired from the NBL after 511 games. His 511 games ranks 11th all-time, and his 904 three-pointers ranks 13th all-time.

Forman had a brief stint with the Hawke's Bay Hawks of the New Zealand NBL in 2018, and in 2022 he had a brief stint in the NBL1 East with the Illawarra Hawks.

== National team career ==
Forman was a member of the Australian team that competed at the 2003 World University Summer Games in Korea. He later competed for the Boomers at the 2005 FIBA Stanković Continental Champions' Cup and the 2009 FIBA Oceania Championship.

== Personal life ==
Forman is of Italian heritage.

In April 2022, Forman was appointed Basketball Illawarra's general manager. He left the role in February 2024.
