= 2010–11 Melbourne Tigers season =

- Head coach: (Australia) Al Westover (Australia) Darryl McDonald
- Captain: (Australia) Cameron Tragardh
- Arena: State Netball Hockey Centre

NBL results
- Record: 10–18 (35.7%)
- Ladder: 7th
- Finals finish: Did not qualify
- Stats at NBL.com.au

Player records
- Points: (United States) Williams 17.3
- Rebounds: (Australia) Nevill 7.4
- Assists: (United States) Williams 6.1

Uniforms
| Home | Away |

The 2010–11 Melbourne Tigers season was the 28th season of the franchise in the National Basketball League (NBL).

The Tigers went into this season without the experience of former captain Chris Anstey and fellow ex-boomer Sam Mackinnon as the pair retired at the end of the 2009–10 NBL season.

== Off-season ==
=== Additions ===
| Player | Signed | Former team |
|---|---|---|
| Cameron Tragardh | Signed to 3-year deal in April. | Wollongong Hawks |

=== Subtractions ===
| Player | Reason left | New team |
|---|---|---|
| Chris Anstey | Retired | n/a |
| Sam Mackinnon | Retired | n/a |

== Roster ==
Note: Flags indicate national team eligibility at FIBA-sanctioned events. Players may hold other non-FIBA nationalities not displayed.

2010–11 Melbourne Tigers roster
Players
Coaches

| Pos. | No. | Nat. | Name | Ht. | Wt. |
|---|---|---|---|---|---|
| G | 1 | (United States) | Williams, Corey (I) | 1.91 m (6 ft 3 in) | 86 kg (190 lb) |
| G | 3 | (Australia) | Qaafow, Yusef (DP) | 1.88 m (6 ft 2 in) |
| G | 4 | (Australia) | Corletto, Daryl | 1.93 m (6 ft 4 in) | 88 kg (194 lb) |
| F | 5 | (Australia) | Greer, Tommy | 2.00 m (6 ft 7 in) | 95 kg (209 lb) |
| G | 7 | (Australia) | Adepoju, Moses (DP) | 1.96 m (6 ft 5 in) |
| G | 9 | (Australia) | Lewis, Bennie | 2.03 m (6 ft 8 in) | 84 kg (185 lb) |
| F | 11 | (Australia) | Tragardh, Cameron (C) | 2.09 m (6 ft 10 in) | 112 kg (247 lb) |
| C | 12 | (Australia) | Helliwell, Wade | 2.12 m (6 ft 11 in) | 118 kg (260 lb) |
| G | 14 | (United States) | Campbell, Terrance (I) | 1.75 m (5 ft 9 in) | 86 kg (190 lb) |
| F/C | 22 | (Australia) | Burston, Matt | 2.11 m (6 ft 11 in) | 103 kg (227 lb) |
| G | 23 | (United States) | Devendorf, Eric (I) | 1.93 m (6 ft 4 in) | 82 kg (181 lb) |
| F | 24 | (Australia) | Walker, Lucas | 2.03 m (6 ft 8 in) | 102 kg (225 lb) |
| C | 33 | (Australia) | Nevill, Luke | 2.16 m (7 ft 1 in) | 120 kg (265 lb) |
| G | 41 | (Australia) | Westover, Boden (DP) | 1.88 m (6 ft 2 in) |
| F | 45 | (Bosnia and Herzegovina) | Zunic, Edin (DP) | 2.06 m (6 ft 9 in) |
| G | 53 | (Australia) | Stone, Robbie (DP) | 1.85 m (6 ft 1 in) |

Head coach

- (Australia) Al Westover

Assistant coach(es)

- (Australia) Darryl McDonald
- (Australia) Warrick Giddey

Strength & conditioning coach(es)

- (Australia) Warrick Vale

Team manager

- (Australia) Ian Jones

Legend

- (C) Team captain
- (DP) Development player
- (I) Import player
- Injured

- Roster
Updated: 2 February 2011

=== Depth chart ===
| Pos. | Starting 5 | Bench 1 | Bench 2 | Development |
|---|---|---|---|---|
| C | Matt Burston | Luke Nevill | Wade Helliwell |
| PF | Cameron Tragardh | Lucas Walker | | Edin Zunic |
| SF | Tommy Greer | | | Moses Adepoju |
| SG | Daryl Corletto | Eric Devendorf | Bennie Lewis | Boden Westover |
| PG | Corey Williams | Terrance Campbell | Yusef Qaafow | Robbie Stone |

== Regular season ==
=== Ladder ===
Below is the ladder at the end of the season, before the finals. The top 4 teams qualified for the finals series.

| Pos | 2010–11 NBL season | | | | | | | | | | | |
| Pos | Team | Pld | W | L | PCT | Last 5 | Streak | Home | Away | PF | PA | PP |
|---|---|---|---|---|---|---|---|---|---|---|---|---|
| 1 | New Zealand Breakers | 28 | 22 | 6 | 78.57% | 4–1 | W3 | 12–2 | 10–4 | 2463 | 2367 | 104.06% |
| 2 | Townsville Crocodiles | 28 | 17 | 11 | 60.71% | 3–2 | L1 | 13–1 | 4–10 | 2225 | 2163 | 102.87% |
| 3 | Cairns Taipans^{1} | 28 | 16 | 12 | 57.14% | 4–1 | W4 | 12–2 | 4–10 | 2186 | 2107 | 103.75% |
| 4 | Perth Wildcats^{1} | 28 | 16 | 12 | 57.14% | 3–2 | L2 | 10–4 | 6–8 | 2380 | 2192 | 108.58% |
| 5 | Wollongong Hawks | 28 | 15 | 13 | 53.57% | 4–1 | W1 | 10–4 | 5–9 | 2272 | 2209 | 102.85% |
| 6 | Gold Coast Blaze | 28 | 13 | 15 | 46.43% | 2–3 | W1 | 8–6 | 5–9 | 2396 | 2440 | 98.20% |
| 7 | Melbourne Tigers | 28 | 10 | 18 | 35.71% | 1–4 | L3 | 5–9 | 5–9 | 2209 | 2357 | 93.72% |
| 8 | Adelaide 36ers | 28 | 9 | 19 | 32.14% | 1–4 | L1 | 7–7 | 2–12 | 2212 | 2362 | 93.65% |
| 9 | Sydney Kings | 28 | 8 | 20 | 28.57% | 2–3 | L3 | 5–9 | 3–11 | 2171 | 2317 | 93.70% |

Updated to match(es) played on 2 April 2011. Source: NBL.com.au

The NBL tie-breaker system, as outlined in the NBL Rules and Regulations, states that in the case of an identical win–to–loss record, the results in games played between the teams will determine the order of seeding.

=== Game log ===
2010–11 game log
October: 0–3 (Home: 0–2; Road: 0–1)

| Game | Date | Team | Score | High points | High rebounds | High assists | Location Attendance | Record |
|---|---|---|---|---|---|---|---|---|
| 1 | 15 October | Sydney | L 68–84 | Luke Nevill (17) | Luke Nevill (12) | Cameron Tragardh (5) | State Netball Hockey Centre | 0–1 |
| 2 | 24 October | Perth | L 66–91 | Cameron Tragardh (16) | Luke Nevill (8) | Matt Burston (3) | State Netball Hockey Centre | 0–2 |
| 3 | 28 October | @ New Zealand | L 84–79 | Terrance Campbell (16) | Wade Helliwell (8) | Terrance Campbell (4) | North Shore Events Centre | 0–3 |

November: 1–4 (Home: 0–2; Road: 1–2)

| Game | Date | Team | Score | High points | High rebounds | High assists | Location Attendance | Record |
|---|---|---|---|---|---|---|---|---|
| 4 | 7 November | Wollongong | L 82–86 | Terrance Campbell (21) | Matt Burston (11) | Terrance Campbell (5) | State Netball Hockey Centre | 0–4 |
| 5 | 14 November | @ Wollongong | L 93–82 | Eric Devendorf (19) | Luke Nevill (9) | Eric Devendorf (4) | WIN Entertainment Centre | 0–5 |
| 6 | 19 November | Perth | L 84–93 | Cameron Tragardh (19) | Matt Burston (12) | Corey Williams (10) | State Netball Hockey Centre | 0–6 |
| 7 | 21 November | @ Gold Coast | W 82–85 | Corey Williams (19) | Tommy Greer (12) | Tragardh, Williams (2) | Gold Coast Convention Centre | 1–6 |
| 8 | 26 November | @ Townsville | L 94–66 | Cameron Tragardh (15) | Corey Williams (7) | Corey Williams (4) | Townsville Entertainment Centre | 1–7 |

December: 2–2 (Home: 1–1; Road: 1–1)

| Game | Date | Team | Score | High points | High rebounds | High assists | Location Attendance | Record |
|---|---|---|---|---|---|---|---|---|
| 9 | 4 December | Gold Coast | W 82–78 | Corey Williams (24) | Matt Burston (8) | Corey Williams (4) | State Netball Hockey Centre | 2–7 |
| 10 | 12 December | @ Perth | L 87–76 | Eric Devendorf (19) | Luke Nevill (9) | Corey Williams (6) | Challenge Stadium | 2–8 |
| 11 | 18 December | New Zealand | L 80–90 | Corey Williams (19) | Nevill, Williams (12) | Burston, Nevill (3) | State Netball Hockey Centre | 2–9 |
| 12 | 23 December | @ Sydney | W 73–82 | Eric Devendorf (23) | Luke Nevill (15) | Corey Williams (3) | Sydney Entertainment Centre | 3–9 |

January: 3–3 (Home: 2–1; Road: 1–2)

| Game | Date | Team | Score | High points | High rebounds | High assists | Location Attendance | Record |
|---|---|---|---|---|---|---|---|---|
| 13 | 2 January | Adelaide | W 87–66 | Luke Nevill (23) | Corey Williams (10) | Corey Williams (11) | State Netball Hockey Centre | 4–9 |
| 14 | 7 January | @ Perth | W 86–93 | Corey Williams (26) | Corey Williams (8) | Corey Williams (6) | Challenge Stadium | 5–9 |
| 15 | 14 January | @ Townsville | L 94–78 | Corey Williams (18) | Matt Burston (9) | Devendorf, Williams (4) | Townsville Entertainment Centre | 5–10 |
| 16 | 15 January | @ Cairns | L 95–74 | Corey Williams (18) | Matt Burston (8) | Devendorf, Helliwell (3) | Cairns Convention Centre | 5–11 |
| 17 | 22 January | Cairns | W 83–76 | Luke Nevill (19) | Corey Williams (7) | Corey Williams (9) | State Netball Hockey Centre | 6–11 |
| 18 | 26 January | Sydney | L 67–85 | Matt Burston (13) | Corey Williams (9) | Corey Williams (9) | State Netball Hockey Centre | 6–12 |

February: 3–1 (Home: 2–0; Road: 1–1)

| Game | Date | Team | Score | High points | High rebounds | High assists | Location Attendance | Record |
|---|---|---|---|---|---|---|---|---|
| 19 | 6 February | Wollongong | W 93–72 | Corey Williams (19) | Matt Burston (10) | Corey Williams (11) | State Netball Hockey Centre | 7–12 |
| 20 | 11 February | @ New Zealand | L 101–91 | Cameron Tragardh (35) | Burston, Tragardh (10) | Corey Williams (6) | North Shore Events Centre | 7–13 |
| 21 | 18 February | @ Adelaide | W 83–86 | Matt Burston (24) | Matt Burston (13) | Corey Williams (10) | Adelaide Arena | 8–13 |
| 22 | 19 February | Cairns | L 70–63 | Matt Burston (19) | Tommy Greer (10) | Cameron Tragardh (5) | State Netball Hockey Centre | 9–13 |

March: 1–4 (Home: 0–2; Road: 1–2)

| Game | Date | Team | Score | High points | High rebounds | High assists | Location Attendance | Record |
|---|---|---|---|---|---|---|---|---|
| 23 | 6 March | @ Sydney | L 95–86 | Daryl Corletto (24) | Greer, Walker (10) | Corey Williams (6) | Sydney Entertainment Centre | 9–14 |
| 24 | 12 March | @ Cairns | L 79–63 | Corey Williams (19) | Matt Burston (11) | Corey Williams (7) | Cairns Convention Centre | 9–15 |
| 25 | 18 March | @ Adelaide | W 76–79 | Daryl Corletto (22) | Burston, Williams (6) | Corey Williams (5) | Adelaide Arena | 10–15 |
| 26 | 20 March | Gold Coast | L 81–82 | Corey Williams (25) | Corey Williams (11) | Corey Williams (7) | State Netball Hockey Centre | 10–16 |
| 27 | 25 March | Townsville | L 72–82 | Corey Williams (17) | Lucas Walker (10) | Corey Williams (6) | State Netball Hockey Centre | 10–17 |

April: 0–1 (Home: 0–0; Road: 0–1)

| Game | Date | Team | Score | High points | High rebounds | High assists | Location Attendance | Record |
|---|---|---|---|---|---|---|---|---|
| 28 | 2 April | @ New Zealand | L 74–87 | Corletto, Tragardh (15) | Wade Helliwell (5) | Corey Williams (8) | State Netball Hockey Centre | 10–18 |

== Player statistics ==
=== Regular season ===
| Category | Player | Stat |
|---|---|---|
| Points per game | Corey Williams | 17.3 |
| Rebounds per game | Luke Nevill | 7.4 |
| Assists per game | Corey Williams | 6.1 |
| Steals per game | Corey Williams | 1.3 |
| Blocks per game | Luke Nevill | 1.2 |
| Free throw percentage | Daryl Corletto | 96.4% |

== Awards ==
=== Player of the Week ===
- Round 8: Corey Williams – 24 points, 7 rebounds, 4 assists and 1 steal vs. Gold Coast Blaze @ State Netball and Hockey Centre

=== Melbourne Tigers Awards ===
- Most Valuable Player: Corey Williams

== See also ==
2010–11 NBL season
