= 2011–12 Melbourne Tigers season =

- Head coach: (Australia) Trevor Gleeson
- Captain: (Australia) Tommy Greer
- Arena: State Netball Hockey Centre

NBL results
- Record: 11–17 (39.3%)
- Ladder: 6th
- Finals finish: Did not qualify
- Stats at NBL.com.au

Player records
- Points: (Australia) Mills 18.6
- Rebounds: (United States) Allen 5.9
- Assists: (United States) Allen 6.2

Uniforms
| Home | Away |

The 2011–12 Melbourne Tigers season was the 29th season of the franchise in the National Basketball League (NBL).

After missing out on the playoffs last season, Melbourne will look to improve and return to finals stages of this season's competition. Due to the 2011 NBA Lockout, Melbourne acquired the services of Patrick Mills for the first 9 rounds until losing him to the Chinese team Xinjiang Flying Tigers.

== Off-season ==
=== Additions ===
| Player | Signed | Former Team |
|---|---|---|
| Patrick Mills | Signed 29 August (due to NBA lockout) | Portland Trail Blazers |
| Ayinde Ubaka | Announced 25 May | Cairns Taipans |
| Ron Dorsey | Announced 25 May | Cairns Taipans |
| Daniel Dillon | Announced in May | Cairns Taipans |

== Roster ==
Note: Flags indicate national team eligibility at FIBA-sanctioned events. Players may hold other non-FIBA nationalities not displayed.

2011–12 Melbourne Tigers roster
Players
Coaches

| Pos. | No. | Nat. | Name | Ht. | Wt. |
|---|---|---|---|---|---|
| G | 0 | (United States) | Ubaka, Ayinde (I) | 1.91 m (6 ft 3 in) | 91 kg (201 lb) |
| F | 5 | (Australia) | Greer, Tommy (C) | 2.00 m (6 ft 7 in) | 95 kg (209 lb) |
| F | 7 | (United States) | Dorsey, Ron (I) | 1.97 m (6 ft 6 in) | 93 kg (205 lb) |
| G/F | 9 | (Australia) | Lewis, Bennie | 2.03 m (6 ft 8 in) | 84 kg (185 lb) |
| F | 11 | (Australia) | Tragardh, Cameron | 2.09 m (6 ft 10 in) | 112 kg (247 lb) |
| G | 12 | (Australia) | Dillon, Daniel | 1.94 m (6 ft 4 in) | 91 kg (201 lb) |
| F | 13 | (Australia) | Rush, Liam | 2.02 m (6 ft 8 in) | 94 kg (207 lb) |
| G | 14 | (Australia) | Wilcher, Josh (DP) | 1.78 m (5 ft 10 in) | 85 kg (187 lb) |
| G | 20 | (Australia) | Mills, Patty | 1.83 m (6 ft 0 in) | 84 kg (185 lb) |
| F/C | 22 | (Australia) | Burston, Matt | 2.11 m (6 ft 11 in) | 103 kg (227 lb) |
| F | 24 | (Australia) | Walker, Lucas | 2.03 m (6 ft 8 in) | 102 kg (225 lb) |
| G | 45 | (United States) | Allen, Myron (I) | 1.80 m (5 ft 11 in) | 82 kg (181 lb) |
| G/F | 53 | (Australia) | Odigie, Owen (DP) | 1.96 m (6 ft 5 in) | 93 kg (205 lb) |
| C | 54 | (Australia) | Lang, Tim | 2.09 m (6 ft 10 in) | 115 kg (254 lb) |

Head coach

- (Australia) Trevor Gleeson

Assistant coach(es)

- (Australia) Rohan Short

Strength & conditioning coach(es)

- (Australia) Daniel Meehan

Team manager

- (Australia) Ian Jones

Legend

- (C) Team captain
- (DP) Development player
- (I) Import player
- Injured

- Roster
Updated: 21 March 2012

=== Depth chart ===
| Pos. | Starting 5 | Bench 1 | Bench 2 | Development |
|---|---|---|---|---|
| C | Matt Burston | Timothy Lang |
| PF | Cameron Tragardh | Lucas Walker |
| SF | Tommy Greer | Liam Rush | | Owen Odigie |
| SG | Ron Dorsey | Daniel Dillon | Bennie Lewis |
| PG | Patty Mills | Myron Allen | Ayinde Ubaka | Josh Wilcher |

== Regular season ==
=== Standings ===
| Pos | 2011–12 NBL season | | | | | | | | | | | |
| Pos | Team | Pld | W | L | PCT | Last 5 | Streak | Home | Away | PF | PA | PP |
|---|---|---|---|---|---|---|---|---|---|---|---|---|
| 1 | New Zealand Breakers | 28 | 21 | 7 | 75.00% | 4–1 | L1 | 13–1 | 8–6 | 2382 | 2177 | 109.42% |
| 2 | Perth Wildcats | 28 | 19 | 9 | 67.86% | 3–2 | W3 | 10–4 | 9–5 | 2434 | 2171 | 112.11% |
| 3 | Gold Coast Blaze | 28 | 17 | 11 | 60.71% | 3–2 | W2 | 10–4 | 7–7 | 2387 | 2253 | 105.95% |
| 4 | Townsville Crocodiles^{1} | 28 | 15 | 13 | 53.37% | 2–3 | L2 | 11–3 | 4–10 | 2213 | 2210 | 100.14% |
| 5 | Cairns Taipans^{1} | 28 | 15 | 13 | 53.37% | 2–3 | W1 | 9–5 | 6–8 | 2025 | 2107 | 96.11% |
| 6 | Melbourne Tigers^{2} | 28 | 11 | 17 | 39.29% | 1–4 | L3 | 7–7 | 4–10 | 2156 | 2239 | 96.29% |
| 7 | Sydney Kings^{2} | 28 | 11 | 17 | 39.29% | 2–3 | L1 | 5–9 | 6–8 | 2279 | 2423 | 94.06% |
| 8 | Wollongong Hawks | 28 | 9 | 19 | 32.14% | 3–2 | W3 | 4–10 | 5–9 | 2093 | 2232 | 93.77% |
| 9 | Adelaide 36ers | 28 | 8 | 20 | 28.57% | 1–4 | L4 | 4–10 | 4–10 | 2297 | 2454 | 93.60% |

Updated to match(es) played on 25 March 2012. Source: NBL.com.au

=== Game log ===
2011–12 game log
October: 3–1 (Home: 2–0; Road: 1–1)

| Game | Date | Team | Score | High points | High rebounds | High assists | Location Attendance | Record |
|---|---|---|---|---|---|---|---|---|
| 1 | 7 October | Sydney | W 82–76 | Patrick Mills (28) | Cameron Tragardh (9) | Ayinde Ubaka (2) | State Netball Hockey Centre | 1–0 |
| 2 | 14 October | @ Perth | L 92–76 | Patrick Mills (19) | Tommy Greer (9) | Ayinde Ubaka (6) | Challenge Stadium | 1–1 |
| 3 | 22 October | New Zealand | W 67–64 | Patrick Mills (19) | Daniel Dillon (7) | Daniel Dillon (4) | State Netball Hockey Centre | 2–1 |
| 4 | 30 October | @ Wollongong | W 74–82 | Patrick Mills (20) | Burston, Walker (6) | Liam Rush (4) | WIN Entertainment Centre | 3–1 |

November: 3–3 (Home: 2–2; Road: 1–1)

| Game | Date | Team | Score | High points | High rebounds | High assists | Location Attendance | Record |
|---|---|---|---|---|---|---|---|---|
| 5 | 4 November | @ Sydney | W 76–94 | Patrick Mills (20) | Dillon, Walker (5) | Patrick Mills (8) | Sydney Entertainment Centre | 4–1 |
| 6 | 6 November | Cairns | W 80–63 | Cameron Tragardh (17) | Tommy Greer (9) | Patrick Mills (10) | State Netball Hockey Centre | 5–1 |
| 7 | 11 November | Townsville | L 88–95 | Cameron Tragardh (26) | Cameron Tragardh (14) | Patrick Mills (10) | State Netball Hockey Centre | 5–2 |
| 8 | 18 November | Perth | W 87–82 | Ayinde Ubaka (23) | Tommy Greer (7) | Patrick Mills (6) | State Netball Hockey Centre | 6–2 |
| 9 | 19 November | @ Adelaide | L 95–89 | Patrick Mills (32) | Ron Dorsey (7) | Mills, Ubaka, Walker (3) | Adelaide Arena | 6–3 |
| 10 | 25 November | Sydney | L 80–89 | Cameron Tragardh (28) | Cameron Tragardh (5) | Dillon, Greer (4) | State Netball Hockey Centre | 6–4 |

December: 3–2 (Home: 2–0; Road: 1–2)

| Game | Date | Team | Score | High points | High rebounds | High assists | Location Attendance | Record |
|---|---|---|---|---|---|---|---|---|
| 11 | 2 December | @ New Zealand | L 108–98 | Ron Dorsey (21) | Tommy Greer (14) | Daniel Dillon (6) | North Shore Events Centre | 6–5 |
| 12 | 10 December | @ Cairns | L 79–77 | Cameron Tragardh (24) | Ron Dorsey (12) | Ayinde Ubaka (5) | Cairns Convention Centre | 6–6 |
| 13 | 18 December | Townsville | W 93–80 | Cameron Tragardh (19) | Tommy Greer (8) | Daniel Dillon (4) | State Netball Hockey Centre | 7–6 |
| 14 | 23 December | Cairns | W 67–65 | Cameron Tragardh (14) | Rush, Tragardh (5) | Daniel Dillon (5) | State Netball Hockey Centre | 8–6 |
| 15 | 31 December | @ Gold Coast | W 72–79 | Cameron Tragardh (25) | Dillon, Greer (7) | Daniel Dillon (4) | Gold Coast Convention Centre | 9–6 |

January: 0–6 (Home: 0–2; Road: 0–4)

| Game | Date | Team | Score | High points | High rebounds | High assists | Location Attendance | Record |
|---|---|---|---|---|---|---|---|---|
| 16 | 6 January | @ Perth | L 72–67 | Rush, Tragardh (17) | Cameron Tragardh (9) | Daniel Dillon (6) | Challenge Stadium | 9–7 |
| 17 | 8 January | New Zealand | L 79–90 | Cameron Tragardh (22) | Cameron Tragardh (7) | Dillon, Ubaka (5) | State Netball Hockey Centre | 9–8 |
| 18 | 15 January | Gold Coast | L 60–73 | Cameron Tragardh (14) | Cameron Tragardh (6) | Daniel Dillon (5) | State Netball Hockey Centre | 9–9 |
| 19 | 19 January | @ New Zealand | L 91–77 | Dillon, Rush (18) | Tommy Greer (7) | Dillon, Tragardh (4) | North Shore Events Centre | 9–10 |
| 20 | 21 January | @ Gold Coast | L 92–78 | Ron Dorsey (24) | Cameron Tragardh (6) | Myron Allen (8) | Gold Coast Convention Centre | 9–11 |
| 21 | 27 January | @ Wollongong | L 90–68 | Liam Rush (18) | Myron Allen (9) | Myron Allen (6) | WIN Entertainment Centre | 9–12 |

February: 1–2 (Home: 1–1; Road: 0–1)

| Game | Date | Team | Score | High points | High rebounds | High assists | Location Attendance | Record |
|---|---|---|---|---|---|---|---|---|
| 22 | 3 February | Adelaide | W 87–81 | Cameron Tragardh (20) | Allen, Greer, Walker (6) | Myron Allen (8) | State Netball Hockey Centre | 10–12 |
| 23 | 18 February | @ Cairns | L 77–56 | Myron Allen (13) | Myron Allen (10) | Myron Allen (3) | Cairns Convention Centre | 10–13 |
| 24 | 25 February | Adelaide | L 83–92 | Cameron Tragardh (19) | Lucas Walker (9) | Myron Allen (7) | State Netball Hockey Centre | 10–14 |

March: 1–3 (Home: 0–2; Road: 1–1)

| Game | Date | Team | Score | High points | High rebounds | High assists | Location Attendance | Record |
|---|---|---|---|---|---|---|---|---|
| 25 | 2 March | @ Sydney | W 61–66 | Lucas Walker (12) | Lucas Walker (7) | Myron Allen (4) | Sydney Entertainment Centre | 11–14 |
| 26 | 4 March | @ Townsville | L 67–64 | Dorsey, Walker (13) | Burston, Walker (6) | Myron Allen (7) | Townsville Entertainment Centre | 11–15 |
| 27 | 18 March | Wollongong | L 61–71 | Bennie Lewis (15) | Tommy Greer (8) | Dillon (7) | State Netball Hockey Centre | 11–16 |
| 28 | 23 March | Perth | L 71–72 | Ron Dorsey (22) | Matt Burston (13) | Myron Allen (7) | State Netball Hockey Centre | 11–17 |

== See also ==
2011–12 NBL season
