= Parky =

Parky may refer, hypocoristically, to:

- Andrew Parkinson (basketball) (born 1967), Australian basketball player
- Frank Parkinson (baseball) (1895–1960), American baseball player
- Gary Parkinson (born 1968), English footballer
- Michael Parkinson (1935–2023), English broadcaster
- Parkyakarkus (1904–1958), American dialect comedy actor
