= John Rillie =

Australian basketball player & coach (born 1971)

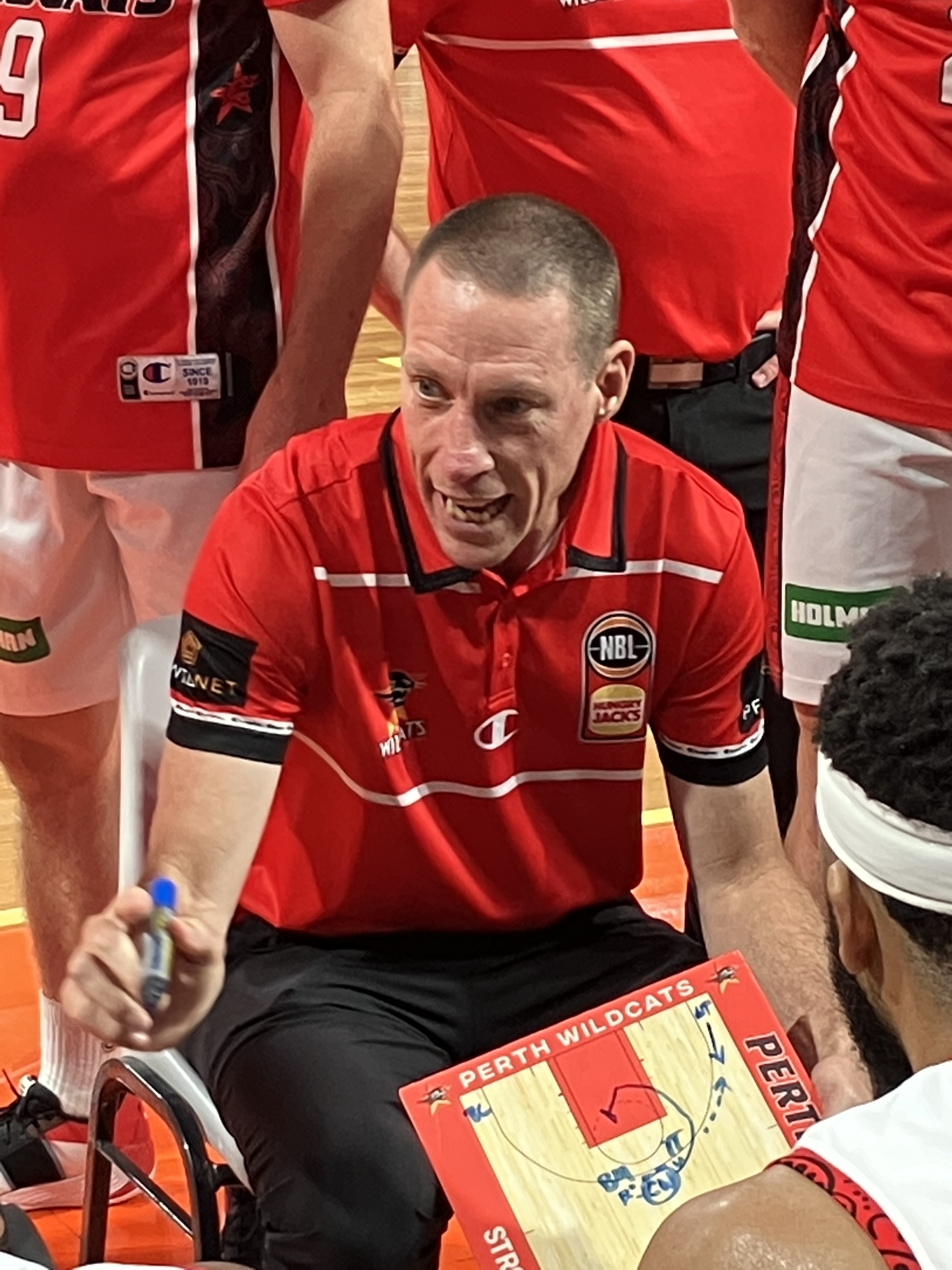
- Rillie with the Perth Wildcats in 2022

Perth Wildcats
- Title: Head coach
- League: NBL

Personal information
- Born: 4 November 1971 (age 55) Toowoomba, Queensland, Australia
- Listed height: 195 cm (6 ft 5 in)
- Listed weight: 85 kg (187 lb)

Career information
- High school: Harristown State (Toowoomba, Queensland)
- College: Tacoma CC (1991–1992); Gonzaga (1992–1995)
- NBA draft: 1995: undrafted
- Playing career: 1990–2010
- Position: Shooting guard
- Coaching career: 2011–present

Career history

Playing
- 1990–1991: Toowoomba Mountaineers
- 1995: Brisbane Bullets
- 1996–1998: Adelaide 36ers
- 1998–2002: West Sydney Razorbacks
- 1999–2000: Penrith Panthers
- 2002: AEK Athens
- 2002–2004: West Sydney Razorbacks
- 2004–2009: Townsville Crocodiles
- 2009–2010: New Zealand Breakers

Coaching
- 2011–2017: Boise State (assistant)
- 2017–2022: UC Santa Barbara (assistant)
- 2022–present: Perth Wildcats

Career highlights
- NBL champion (1998); All-NBL First Team (2004); 3× All-NBL Second Team (2002, 2003, 2005); NBL scoring champion (2003); NBL Rookie of the Year (1995); 2× QBL champion (1990, 1991)

John Peter Rillie (born 4 November 1971) is an Australian professional basketball coach and former player who is the head coach of the Perth Wildcats of the National Basketball League (NBL). He played college basketball in the United States for the Tacoma CC Titans and Gonzaga Bulldogs. Rillie returned to Australia and played 16 seasons in the NBL between 1995 and 2010 for the Brisbane Bullets, Adelaide 36ers, West Sydney Razorbacks, Townsville Crocodiles and New Zealand Breakers. He won an NBL championship with the 36ers in 1998 and was a four-time All-NBL Team selection from 2002 to 2005. Rillie began his coaching career in the United States' college system and was an assistant for the Boise State Broncos and UC Santa Barbara Gauchos from 2011 to 2022. He was appointed as head coach for the Wildcats in 2022.

== Early life and career ==
Rillie was born in Toowoomba, Queensland. Growing up in Toowoomba, he played basketball, cricket and Australian rules football. He attended Harristown State High School.

Rillie began his career with the Toowoomba Mountaineers in the Queensland Basketball League (QBL), where he was a member of the Mountaineers' back-to-back QBL championships in 1990 and 1991.

== College career ==
Rillie moved to the United States in 1991 to play college basketball for Tacoma Community College. In 1992, he transferred to Gonzaga, where he played the next three years. During his three seasons with the Bulldogs, he helped lead the team to the 1994 National Invitation Tournament and the school's first berth in the NCAA tournament in 1995.

== Professional career ==
After graduating college, Rillie returned to Australia and debuted in the National Basketball League (NBL) during the 1995 season with the Brisbane Bullets, where he won NBL Rookie of the Year. He joined the Adelaide 36ers in 1996 and played three seasons for them, winning a championship in 1998.

For the 1998–99 NBL season, Rillie joined the West Sydney Razorbacks. During the 1999 and 2000 off-seasons, he played for the Penrith Panthers in the SEABL.

After four seasons with the Razorbacks and a grand final appearance in 2001–02, Rillie moved to Greece for the 2002–03 season to play for AEK Athens. He returned to Australia in December 2002 and re-joined the Razorbacks. On 1 March 2003, he scored 45 points and made eleven 3-pointers in a 113–102 win over the Canberra Cannons. His 23.6 points per game during the 2002–03 NBL season earned him the scoring title. He had another 45-point game during the semi-finals of the 2003–04 NBL season. That season, he was named All-NBL First Team and helped the Razorbacks reach the grand final. He was subsequently granted a release from the final year of his contract with West Sydney.

In June 2004, Rillie signed with the Townsville Crocodiles. On 18 February 2009, he scored 34 points and made ten 3-pointers in the Crocodiles' 103–96 win over the Perth Wildcats in the elimination final.

His final season in the NBL came in 2009–10 with the New Zealand Breakers. He was limited to 12 games.

In 481 NBL games, Rillie averaged 16.3 points, 5.8 rebounds, 3.7 assists and 1.1 steals per game.

In November 2024, Rillie was inducted into the Queensland Basketball Hall of Fame.

== National team career ==
From 1997 to 2004, Rillie played for the Australia men's national basketball team. He represented the Boomers at the 2004 Athens Olympics.

== Coaching career ==
In 2010, Rillie returned to the United States and during the 2010–11 season, he served as the director of basketball operations for the Boise State Broncos.

In 2011, Rillie was appointed an assistant coach of the Broncos, a position he held for six seasons. In 2017, he was hired as an assistant coach for the UC Santa Barbara Gauchos. After his first season with the Gauchos, he was promoted to associate head coach. The 2021–22 season was his fifth with the Gauchos and fourth as associate head coach.

Rillie was an assistant coach for the Australian Boomers at the Tokyo Olympics in July and August 2021, helping guide the Boomers to the bronze medal.

On 11 July 2022, Rillie was appointed head coach of the Perth Wildcats of the NBL on a three-year contract. Following the 2022–23 NBL season, he served on the New York Knicks coaching staff during the 2023 NBA Summer League. Following the 2023–24 NBL season, he served on the New Orleans Pelicans coaching staff during the 2024 NBA Summer League.

On 17 September 2024, Rillie signed a three-year contract extension with the Wildcats to remain as head coach until the end of the 2027–28 season.

In November 2025, Rillie was appointed an assistant coach for the Australian Boomers for the first window of the FIBA Basketball World Cup 2027 Asian Qualifiers. In February 2026, he was appointed head coach for two more Asian qualifiers. In November 2026, he was appointed head coach for two more Asian qualifiers.

== Personal life ==
Rillie and his wife Heidi have three children. Heidi is American but holds dual Australian citizenship. Their children were all born in Australia. His son, Jaron, is also a basketball player.
