= Angus Brandt =

Australian basketball player (born 1989)

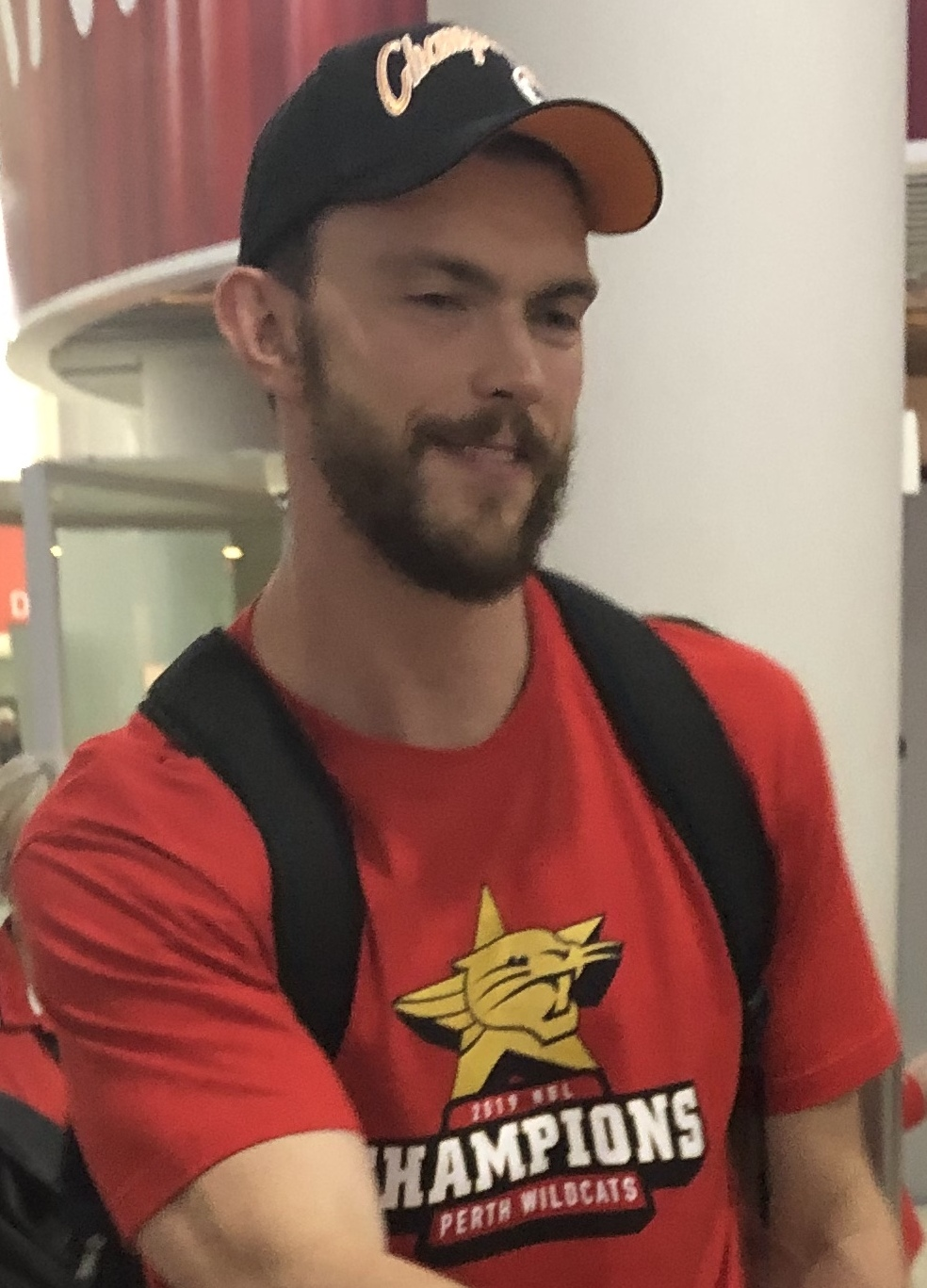
- Brandt with the Perth Wildcats in 2019

No. 26 – Perth Wildcats
- Position: Centre
- League: NBL

Personal information
- Born: 26 October 1989 (age 37) (Note: Some sources list him as being born on 26 October 1989, while others state he was born on 28 October 1989.) Sydney, New South Wales, Australia
- Listed height: 208 cm (6 ft 10 in)
- Listed weight: 116 kg (256 lb)

Career information
- High school: Blaxland (Blaxland, New South Wales); Lake Forest Academy (Lake Forest, Illinois)
- College: Oregon State (2009–2014)
- NBA draft: 2014: undrafted
- Playing career: 2014–present

Career history
- 2014: Penrith Panthers
- 2014–2016: Sydney Kings
- 2016: Neptūnas Klaipėda
- 2016–2019: Perth Wildcats
- 2018–2019: Hawke's Bay Hawks
- 2019: Wuhan Dangdai
- 2019–2020: Pistoia Basket 2000
- 2020–2021: Shiga Lakestars
- 2021–2023: Kagawa Five Arrows
- 2023–2024: Ibaraki Robots
- 2024: Shinshu Brave Warriors
- 2024–2026: Veltex Shizuoka
- 2026–present: Perth Wildcats

Career highlights
- 2× NBL champion (2017, 2019); NBL Rookie of the Year (2015); NZNBL All-Star Five (2018); Second-team Pac-12 All-Academic (2014); First-team Pac-12 All-Academic (2011)
Medals
Men's basketball
Representing Australia
Commonwealth Games
Gold medal – first place	2018 Gold Coast	Team competition
FIBA Asia Cup
Gold medal – first place	2017 Lebanon

Angus John Brandt (born 26 October 1989) is an Australian professional basketball player for the Perth Wildcats of the National Basketball League (NBL). He played college basketball for the Oregon State Beavers before beginning his professional career in 2014. He played two seasons for the Sydney Kings of the NBL between 2014 and 2016 before spending three seasons with the Perth Wildcats between 2016 and 2019. He won two NBL championships with the Wildcats in 2017 and 2019. After a season in Italy, he played six seasons in Japan between 2020 and 2026.

== Early life ==
Brandt was born in Sydney, New South Wales, in the suburb of Wahroonga. He grew up in the Blue Mountains region, with his hometown being Springwood. He attended Blaxland High School in Blaxland, where he graduated from in 2007.

In 2008, Brandt moved to the United States for a pre season at Lake Forest Academy in Lake Forest, Illinois. In the 2008–09 season, he averaged 15 points and 10 rebounds per game.

== College career ==
As a freshman at Oregon State in 2009–10, Brandt played sparingly for a Beavers team that finished the season with a 14–18 record. In 26 games (two starts), he averaged 1.1 points and 1.1 rebounds in 9.2 minutes per game.

As a sophomore in 2010–11, Brandt earned first-team Pac-12 All-Academic honors, while also earning a bigger role on the team which led to higher production value. In 29 games (21 starts), he averaged 4.8 points and 2.5 rebounds in 16.0 minutes per game.

As a junior in 2011–12, Brandt led the team in three-point field goal percentage with 49.2 percent (29-for-59), finished ninth in the Pac-12 in field goal percentage with 53.5 percent (122-for-228), and earned Pac-12 All-Academic Honorable Mention honors. In 36 games (35 starts), he averaged 9.1 points, 3.4 rebounds and 1.1 assists in 23.2 minutes per game.

On 16 November 2012, Brandt suffered an isolated tear of the ACL in his right knee against Purdue that required surgery and forced him to miss the remainder of the 2012–13 season. He was later granted medical hardship by the Pac-12 Faculty Athletics Representative Committee and deemed eligible to play in 2013–14. In four games (all starts), he averaged 11.3 points, 8.5 rebounds, 1.8 assists, 1.0 steals and 1.3 blocks in 30.5 minutes per game. He was again named to the Pac-12 All-Academic Honorable Mention team.

As a redshirted senior in 2013–14, Brandt finished 11th in the Pac-12 in field goal percentage with 51.1 percent (138-for-265), and earned second-team Pac-12 All-Academic honors. On 18 December 2013, he recorded a career-high 27 points against Towson. In 30 games (all starts), he averaged 12.6 points, 3.9 rebounds and 1.5 assists in 25.4 minutes per game.

== Professional career ==
=== Sydney Kings (2014–2016) ===
On 16 June 2014, Brandt signed a three-year deal with the Sydney Kings of the National Basketball League. Between 5 July and 16 August, he played six games for the Penrith Panthers to finish the 2014 Waratah League season, averaging 25.3 points and 10.2 rebounds per game. He played alongside his brother Louis at the Panthers.

With the Kings in the 2014–15 NBL season, Brandt was named NBL Rookie of the Year despite missing seven games with a knee injury. In 21 games, he averaged 7.4 points and four rebounds per game while shooting at nearly 50 per cent from the field.

In the 2015–16 NBL season, Brandt played all 28 games for the Kings and averaged 8.1 points, 5.3 rebounds and 1.2 blocks per game.

=== Lithuania (2016) ===
On 23 February 2016, Brandt signed with Neptūnas Klaipėda of Lithuania for the rest of the 2015–16 LKL season. He helped Neptūnas reach the LKL Finals, where they were defeated 4–1 in the best-of-seven series by Žalgiris. In 21 games, Brandt averaged 4.6 points and 3.8 rebounds per game.

=== Perth Wildcats and Hawke's Bay Hawks (2016–2019) ===
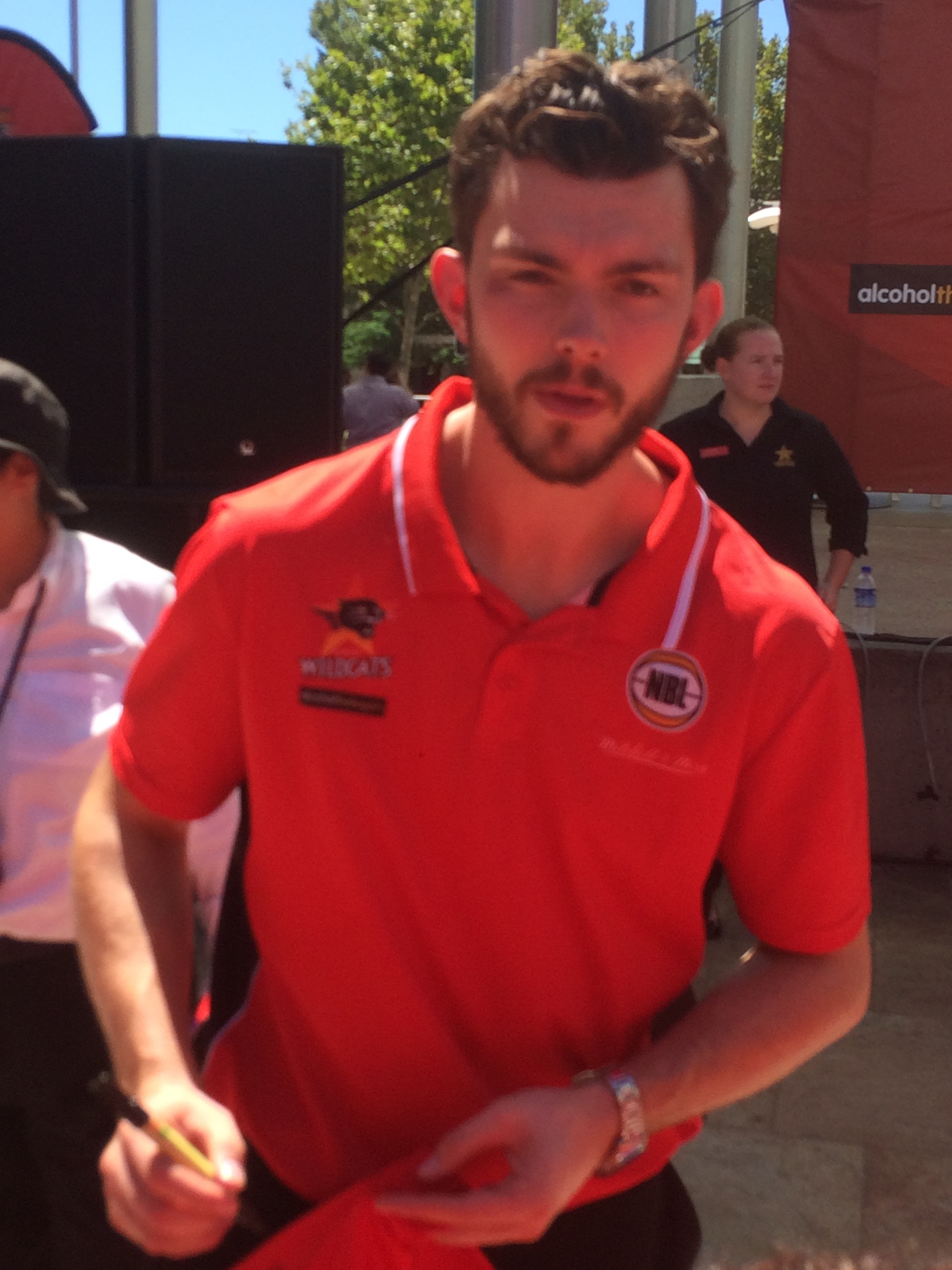
Brandt in March 2017, after winning his first NBL championship

On 12 May 2016, Brandt signed a two-year deal with the Perth Wildcats. His first season with the Wildcats saw him improve as the year went on, as he had a number of memorable performances as the Wildcats faced clutch games towards the end of the season. On 20 January 2017, Brandt played a season-high 30 minutes off the bench and had season-best figures of 17 points and 11 rebounds in an 84–78 overtime win over the Cairns Taipans. The Wildcats finished the regular season in third place with a 15–13 record, and went on to sweep the second-seeded Taipans in the semi-finals to make it through to the best-of-five NBL Grand Final series against the Illawarra Hawks. In game two of the series, Brandt stepped up to cover the loss of Matthew Knight, who suffered a head injury. Brandt recorded 15 points and 11 rebounds to help the Wildcats take a 2–0 lead in the series. The Wildcats took out the championship in game three with a 95–86 win, thus sweeping the series. Brandt had six points, seven rebounds and four assists in 20 minutes off the bench in game three. He appeared in all 33 games for the Wildcats in 2016–17, averaging 6.0 points, 2.9 rebounds and 1.1 assists per game. His development as the season went on saw him earn the Perth Wildcats Most Improved Player Award.

On 17 July 2017, Brandt signed a two-year contract extension with the Wildcats. Brandt turned the hook shot into his trademark during the 2017–18 season. On 16 February 2018, in the Wildcats' second last game of the season, Brandt scored 24 points in a 97–85 loss to Melbourne United. The Wildcats finished the regular season in third place with a 16–12 record before going on to lose 2–0 to the Adelaide 36ers in the semi-finals. Brandt appeared in all 30 games for the Wildcats in 2017–18, averaging 9.8 points, 4.7 rebounds and 1.4 assists per game.

Following the conclusion of the Wildcats' season, Brandt joined the Hawke's Bay Hawks for the 2018 New Zealand NBL season. On 4 May, in just his third game of the season, Brandt scored a season-high 23 points to go with 14 rebounds in a 90–87 win over the Taranaki Mountainairs. On 16 June, he recorded 22 points and a season-high 17 rebounds in a 93–84 win over the Super City Rangers. On 27 July, he had a second 17-rebound effort to go with 14 points against the Canterbury Rams. He helped the Hawks finish the regular season in fourth place with a 12–6 record. In their semi-final against the Wellington Saints, Brandt scored 16 points in a 99–73 loss. In 17 games, he averaged 15.2 points, 8.4 rebounds and 1.6 assists per game. He was subsequently named to the NZNBL All-Star Five.

On 19 September 2018, Brandt was ruled out for three to six weeks with an ankle injury he suffered while playing for the Australian Boomers. He subsequently missed the NBL Blitz and NBA pre-season games. On 27 October 2018, Brandt recorded 14 points and 20 rebounds (12 of them offensive) in a 101–96 double-overtime win over Melbourne United, becoming the first Wildcat with 20+ rebounds in 12 years. On 10 February 2019, he recorded 19 points and nine rebounds in a 95–86 overtime win over the Sydney Kings. He helped the Wildcats win the minor premiership with a first-place finish and an 18–10 record, before going on to advance through to the NBL Grand Final series, where they defeated Melbourne 3–1, with Brandt becoming a two-time champion. In 31 games, he averaged 8.0 points, 5.5 rebounds and 1.3 assists per game.

On 29 March 2019, Brandt parted ways with the Wildcats after opting to exercise the European out-clause in his contract.

On 26 April 2019, Brandt returned to the Hawke's Bay Hawks, signing as a short-term injury replacement for Daniel Kickert. He appeared in two games for the Hawks.

=== China (2019) ===
In June 2019, Brandt joined Wuhan Dangdai of the Chinese NBL. In 13 games, he averaged 20.3 points, 15.2 rebounds and 1.8 assists per game.

=== Italy (2019–2020) ===
On 20 July 2019, Brandt signed with Italian team Pistoia Basket 2000. The 2019–20 LBA season was cancelled in February 2020 due to the coronavirus pandemic. In 19 games, he averaged 11.0 points, 7.9 rebounds and 1.5 assists per game.

=== Japan (2020–2026) ===
On 17 August 2020, Brandt signed with the Shiga Lakestars of the Japanese B.League. In 56 games, he averaged 11.9 points, 8.6 rebounds and 3.3 assists per game.

On 25 June 2021, Brandt signed with the Kagawa Five Arrows, returning to the B.League for a second stint.

On 8 June 2022, Brandt re-signed with the Five Arrows for the 2022–23 season.

On 11 September 2023, Brandt signed with the Ibaraki Robots for the 2023–24 season. He parted ways with the team on 9 January 2024. Three days later, he signed with the Shinshu Brave Warriors for the rest of the season.

On 21 June 2024, Brandt signed with the Veltex Shizuoka.

On 4 June 2025, Brandt re-signed with the Veltex Shizuoka.

=== Return to Perth Wildcats (2026–present) ===
On 10 August 2026, Brandt signed with the Perth Wildcats for the 2026–27 NBL season, returning to the club for a second stint. He entered his second tenure with the Wildcats significantly lighter than when he last played for the club, while having retained his power and strength.

== National team career ==
In 2011, Brandt was part of the Australian University national team that played at the 26th World University Games in Shenzhen, China. In 2014, he was part of the Boomers team that played in the four-game Sino-Australia Challenge series.

In June 2017, Brandt was named in a 20-man Boomers squad ahead of the 2017 FIBA Asia Cup. A month later, he was named in the final 12-man squad. On 24 October 2017, he was named in the 12-man Boomers squad to compete in the first two games of the FIBA World Cup Qualifiers in November.

In February 2022, Brandt was named in a 17-man Australian Boomers squad ahead of the FIBA World Cup Qualifiers in Japan. He re-joined the team later that year for the next qualifying window.

== Personal life ==
Brandt is the son of John and Lorraine Brandt, and has two brothers, Seamus and Louis.

Brandt's wife, Megan, hails from Washington in the United States. The couple have two children, both of whom were born in Japan.
