= Andrew Svaldenis =

Lithuanian-Australian basketball player

Personal information
- Born: 11 April 1965 (age 61) Kaunas, Lithuanian SSR, Soviet Union
- Listed height: 205 cm (6 ft 9 in)
- Listed weight: 108 kg (238 lb)

Career information
- Playing career: 1984–1998
- Position: Center

Career history
- 1984–1985: Bankstown Bruins
- 1986–1991: Sydney SuperSonics / Sydney Kings
- 1992–1993: Hobart Tassie Devils
- 1994: Adelaide 36ers
- 1995–1996: Geelong Supercats
- 1998: Sūduva

Career highlights
- NBL Most Improved Player (1992)

Andrew Svaldenis (born Audrius Svaldenis; 11 April 1965) is a Lithuanian-Australian former professional basketball player. He spent most of his career in the Australian National Basketball League (NBL) where he played for the Bankstown Bruins, Sydney SuperSonics, Sydney Kings, Hobart Tassie Devils, Adelaide 36ers and Geelong Supercats. Sveldenis won the NBL Most Improved Player Award with the Tassie Devils in 1992. He finished his career with Sūduva in Lithuania in 1998.

== Early life ==
Audrius Svaldenis was born in Kaunas, Lithuania. He attended high school in Kaunas where he played alongside Arvydas Sabonis and Šarūnas Marčiulionis. Svaldenis then moved to Marijampolė and studied at a sports school. When he was 15, he moved with his family to Australia to rejoin his stepfather. Svaldenis continued to play basketball with the Lithuanian Australian community in Sydney. Svaldenis claims that he was scouted by Bob Knight while playing at an American sports festival in 1984 and was offered to play for the Indiana Hoosiers but his mother refused to sign the permission.

== Professional career ==
Svaldenis began his professional career with the Bankstown Bruins of the National Basketball League (NBL) as an 18-year-old and became the first Lithuanian player in the league. He played two seasons for the Bruins. He was bought by the Sydney SuperSonics and then joined the Sydney Kings as a result of a team merger in 1988. Svaldenis joined the Hobart Tassie Devils in 1992 on a two-year contract. He had previously played as a reserve throughout his career but saw an increase in his minutes while playing for a weaker team. He won the NBL Most Improved Player Award during his first season with the Tassie Devils in 1992. Svaldenis signed with the Adelaide 36ers in 1994. He was released by the 36ers after one season and joined the Geelong Supercats in 1995. Svaldenis was nicknamed "The Terminator" during his NBL career due to his likeness to Arnold Schwarzenegger.

Svaldenis finished his basketball career in Lithuania with BC Sūduva. He retired from playing basketball aged 35.

== National team career ==
Svaldenis played for the Australian under-20 basketball team but never made it to the national basketball team. He tried to switch allegiance to play for the Lithuania national team but was ineligible because he had represented Australia as a youth.

== Post-playing career ==
Svaldenis worked as a businessman after his basketball career and resold luxury yachts.

== Personal life ==
Svaldenis became an Australian citizen and changed his first name to Andrew. He married a Lithuanian woman from his hometown of Kaunas and has one child.
