= St Augustine's College, Sydney =

Roman Catholic school in Sydney, Australia

Information
- Former name: St Augustine's College, Brookvale
- Type: Independent single-sex primary and secondary day school
- Motto: Latin: Vincit Veritas; English: Truth conquers
- Religious affiliations: Roman Catholic (Order of Saint Augustine)
- Patron saint: Augustine of Hippo
- Established: 1956; 70 years ago
- Founder: Fr. Thomas Alphonsus Hunt, OSA
- Educational authority: Sydney Catholic Schools
- Principal: Jonathan Byrne
- Chaplain: Senan Ward OSA
- Years: 5–12
- Gender: Boys
- Enrolment: 1,200 (2019)
- Campus: 5 hectares (12 acres)
- Colours: Green; Gold; Red
- Affiliation: Independent Schools Association Manly-Warringah Football Association
- Website: www.saintaug.nsw.edu.au

St Augustine's College, Sydney is an independent Roman Catholic single-sex primary and secondary day school for boys, located in Brookvale, on the Northern Beaches of Sydney, New South Wales, Australia. The school caters from approximately 1,200 boys in Year 5 to Year 12 with an education ethos of Augustinian. It was founded by the Priests of the Order of St. Augustine and is situated directly opposite Brookvale Oval.

From its founding until 2003, the college was known as St Augustine's College, Brookvale. When the college began its International Student Program by encouraging enrolments of students from other countries, the name was changed to St Augustine's College, Sydney.

The school is a member of the Independent Sporting Association (ISA), a collection of independent schools grouped primarily for the purpose of sporting competition. Its brother school is Villanova College, located in Brisbane, Queensland also instituted by the Augustinians.

== History ==
The college was founded in 1956 as an all-boys school by Fr. Thomas Alphonsus Hunt, OSA, the Provincial superior of the Province of Australasia of the Order of Saint Augustine, at the request of the then Archbishop of Sydney Norman Cardinal Gilroy. The Augustinians wanted a Parish in Sydney. Cardinal Gilroy offered the Augustinians the Parish of Manly Vale on the condition that they start and run a school for boys within three years of them taking tenure of their Parish. The site of the disused tram terminus in Alfred Road Brookvale was identified and proceedings for its purchase were begun. The land consisted of two lots, A and B in DP - with the easternmost one being purchased by the Sydney Archdiocese and the westernmost one by the Augustinians. Over time, more land surrounding the school has been purchased but ownership of the Eastern lot has remained with the Diocese — now the Diocese of Broken Bay.

In accordance with Augustinian tradition, the Priest who was the head of the school was called "Rector". The first Rector of St Augustine's College's was David John Brimson, OSA who served from 1956 to 1964. The title "Principal" is now used for the lay headmasters.

From its founding, like many Australian Catholic schools of its time, a significant proportion of its staff were professed religious – in this case Augustinian friars or priests – until the order withdrew professed teaching staff when the then Rector Dave Austin retired in 1993 and was succeeded by the first lay Principal – John J. O'Brien. The school then moved to a fully lay Catholic (cf. laity) staff in co-operation with the Augustinian order and ethos.

The College originally operated under the auspices of a College Council and since it was Incorporated in 2004, is operated by a Board of Directors.

The school teaches the curriculum of the NSW Education Standards Authority as well as traditional Catholic values and the Catholic and Augustinian approach to ethics and moral life.

New school emblem incorporating 50th year celebration

2006 was the 50th year "Golden Jubilee" of the school's operation. All students of the school in 2006 were given a "Jubilee Medallion" to commemorate this occasion. Also, the official school Jubilee tie (to be worn only throughout 2006) was created to celebrate this anniversary. The 50 Year Jubilee Tie is gold with green and red stripes as opposed to the older tie, which was green with gold and red stripes. There was also the creation of a new occasional school emblem/logo (only to be used during the Jubilee year of 2006) which displays this celebration.

In 2016, the college celebrated its 60th anniversary. On 25 February, over 1200 students, Old Boys, and past and present staff attended the 60th Anniversary Commemorative Mass at St Mary's Cathedral, Sydney. The principal celebrant of this Mass was Peter A Comensoli, Bishop of Broken Bay, assisted by Old Boy of the college, (Class of 1967) Christopher Saunders, Bishop of Broome as well as Dave Austin OSA, Prior Provincial, and several other Augustinians. Students were presented with a new 60 Years tie and lapel pin to wear at the Mass and for the rest of the year. The original Augustinian logo/crest was incorporated into the design of the tie.

== Patron ==
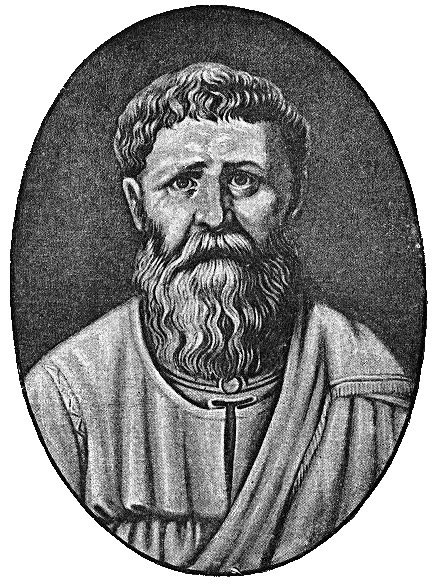
St. Augustine of Hippo as pictured during the Renaissance

The Patron of the college the 4th century saint, Augustine of Hippo, and its motto "Vincit Veritas" (Truth Conquers) is taken from his writings.

== Demographics ==
The school is located in the Northern Beaches Council area. Most students are Roman Catholic.

Over recent years, the college has offered the opportunity for international students (usually from Asian countries such as China) to study at the school - usually with the hope of progressing on to an Australian University and then returning to their homeland, being educated in both Australian and Augustinian culture. The fees are often significantly higher for a student coming from overseas compared to a local student because the Australian Government does not subsidise their tuition fees. The college usually accepts entrants from overseas in Years 10–12, so that an appropriate ratio of local to overseas students is maintained.

== Sport ==
Since the foundation of the school, sport has been an important part of the college curriculum as a means of promoting teamwork, sportsmanship and fair play. Five Olympians have graduated from the school, and The college has also produced numerous State and National representatives in rugby union, rugby league, football (soccer), basketball, swimming, athletics, cricket, AFL, water polo and rowing.

=== Rugby ===
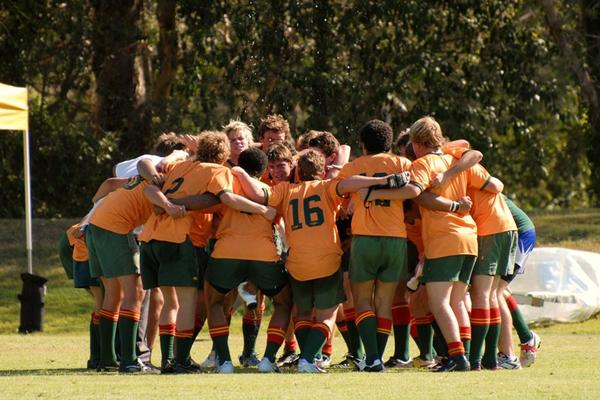
1st XV after winning game against Villanova College in Brisbane

At the time of the college's opening in 1956, Rugby Union was chosen as the Winter sport. It was played between the Colour "Houses" on Thursday afternoons – Sports Day. The various locations for these Colour Comp games were Brookvale Oval; Griffiths Park, Collaroy; Millers Reserve and David Thomas Reserve, Manly Vale; Manly District Park – now known as Nolans – and Kierle Park, Queenscliff.

Another reason for choosing Rugby was that the Brisbane Augustinian School, Villanova College played Rugby and St Augustine's was later to institute annual games against Villanova – the first of which took place at Kierle Park in 1962.

It has also been said that the Augustinians aspired to become a GPS school and GPS Schools played Rugby.

St Augustine's was also to help establish and later join the ISA – Independent Sporting Association and this group of schools also played Rugby.

2008 saw the selection of the first St Augustine's first Australian Schoolboys Representative. The list of reps since then is as follows:

- 2008 Kotoni Ale
- 2008 Salesi Manu
- 2010 Malietoa Hingano, Rhys Dombkins, Samuel Brisby, John Mokofisi
- 2012 Matt Philip
- 2015 Will McRae
- 2017 Albert Hopoate
- 2018 Daniel Ala
- 2019 Max Douglass, Langi Gleeson
- 2023 Joe Walsh, Aaron Brennan
- 2024 Cameron Paull, Charlie Blank, Sam Blank
- 2025 Chayse Geros, Noah Rylands
- 2026 Wilson Ruthven, Joshua Arundal, Flynn Killman, Patrick Donnan

Several boys have also represented as NSW Schoolboys including in addition to those Australian Reps above – Tevita Haliafonua, Salesi Ma’afu and Mitchell Greenway. St Augustine's has, since 2008, won the prestigious state-wide Waratah Shield in nine of the last ten years under the tutelage of Head Coach John Papahatzis and Assistant Coach Mark Downey.

=== Basketball Team Achievements ===
==== Championship Men (Open) ====
- Australian Schools Championships

(gold) Champions: 2014

== Pastoral Houses ==
When the college opened in 1956, the boys were allotted to one of three Colour groups named after the college colours of Red, Green or Gold. To make competition easier, a fourth group - Blue - was added. Later these Colour groups became known as Houses each being named after an Augustinian Bishop.

- Murray (red), named after James Murray osa. Former Bishop of Cooktown, 1898–1914.
- Goold (blue), named after James Alipius Goold osa. First Bishop and Archbishop of Melbourne, 1848–1886
- Crane (green), named after Martin Crane osa. First Bishop of Sandhurst, 1874–1901.
- Reville (gold), named after Stephen Reville osa. Second Bishop of Sandhurst, 1901–1916.
- Hutchinson (purple), named after John Hutchinson osa. Former Bishop of Cooktown, Far North Queensland 1884–1897
- Heavey (light blue), named after John Heavey osa. First Bishop of Cairns, Far North Queensland. 1914–1948

The boys now compete against each other annually to win the Bishop's Shield. The yearly sporting events include an athletics carnival, a swimming carnival, and the Easter Road Race, a race relay run at Brookvale Oval where each house has a representative. The Easter Road Race was initially run on the roads around the college and in the college grounds, but over time, this became too dangerous and so the course was transferred to Brookvale Oval.

== Co-curricular ==
Co-curricular sports and clubs at St Augustine's each are designated points depending on the time required to participate. a certain number of points are required of students at the college every year. The most popular choice among current students is to take part in two medium-high point score sports (usually one sport in Summer and one in Winter). Music, art, design, drama, chess and debating as well as Tae Kwon Do, ceramics, public speaking and tennis are also popular student choices.

The Red Land Club named from Australia's "red centre", and uniquely Australian and Indigenous in its focus, the Red Land Club was another early co-curricular organisation at St. Augustine's. This was a student group founded and run from the 1970s by Rod Cameron OSA during his long teaching tenure at St Augustine's College, (1964–1984). Cameron had a long-established extensive personal relationship with Indigenous Elders throughout Australia. The Red Land Club specifically fostered a sense of connection and understanding with Indigenous Australians. It did this through poetry, drama, music, performance, meetings, seminars, regular Aboriginal elder guest speakers such as Mum (Shirl) Smith, as well as travel into indigenous communities and Dreaming sites through Australia.

== Music ==
A choral tradition was established at the Brookvale college from the 1950s.

== Instrumental and secular music ==
Band and Instrumental music were fostered through the music department's many peripatetic teachers, including players and principals from the internationally acclaimed Sydney Symphony such as Walter Suttcliffe (Double Bass) and Edwin Lorentzen (French Horn, band). The full-time music staff included Ronald Bopf O.S.A. (Recorders and classroom music, on staff 1957–1972), Paul Whelan O.S.A. (flute and piccolo, on staff 1962–1966, 1968–1979), Lynne Leak, Gareth Jude (band) and Graham Press (band). Under Ann Sutcliffe, the college taught Early Music through its madrigal group, and its brace of recorders in the recorder group. It also played and sang in Benjamin Britten's Noye's Fludde together with St Andrew's Cathedral School in St Andrew's Anglican Cathedral in 1977. In conjunction with the drama department, the school also produced musicals such as Gilbert and Sullivan operettas including Trial by Jury in 1978 collaboration with Monte Sant' Angelo and Stella Maris Girls College at Manly.

== Drama ==
Shakespeare's plays were among dramas performed by students at the college during the 1970s, under drama head Barry Hayes (on staff 1969–1975). Then from 1977 to 1980 under the direction of Les Solomon (now well known in Australia and New York as a theatrical manager and agent), in 1977 the school produced The Pirates of Penzance (in collaboration with Monte and Stella Maris), 1978 Frank and Eleanor Perry's David and Lisa, Bob Babalan and Gary Burghoff's You're a Good Man, Charlie Brown, 1979 James Hilton's Goodbye, Mr. Chips, The Crucible by Arthur Miller and in 1980 Harvey Schmidt's The Fantasticks. Most recently the school produced "The Musical, The Musical", written by college staff, in the 1990s and again in 2006. In 2008 the school produced the musical Little Shop of Horrors. The school is also involved in the production of short films by students. In March 2016 the college launched a co-production with Stella Maris College of In The Heights under the musical direction of Joe Montz with Owen Vale and Geoff Cartwright directing.

== Facilities ==
The school's main classrooms and facilities consist of several buildings some stand-alone and some interconnected. In recent years the college has undertaken further refurbishments and expansion meaning many facilities located within the buildings have been moved multiple times. In 2016, two new buildings were constructed and many offices and classrooms renovated. The main buildings in the school are as follows:-

=== Augustine Wing ===
The Augustine Wing is the oldest of the buildings at the college. its Foundation Stone was laid and blessed on 1 April 1956. It was initially a two-storey full-brick structure built to house 5 classrooms but was extended to the north to house another 4. The first section was officially blessed and opened by Norman Cardinal Gilroy on 17 March 1957, despite already being used since November of the previous year. The wing, like the school, is named after St. Augustine of Hippo.

=== Clancy Wing (formerly known as the Mendel Wing) ===
The Mendel Wing, opened in 1961, was specifically designed to hold the school's science classrooms and laboratories.

The current Clancy Wing - which incorporates the original Mendel Wing - was opened in 2017. It houses the new Good Counsel Wing for the Primary School, teachers' offices and an Open Learning Centre. It is three stories high and was initially named after the Augustinian geneticist, Gregor Mendel. Mendel was Abbot of the Abbey of St. Thomas in Brno in the Czech Republic, and the Brno Augustinian community is unique in having an Abbot rather than a Prior to lead it. It was recently upgraded and the science classrooms moved to a new Mendel block located opposite.

=== Tolentine Wing ===
The Tolentine Wing was initially constructed in 1972 as a single storey building to hold the school's expanding library. However, over time, like the Augustine Wing, the building was greatly expanded and eventually became a three-story building used to hold the bulk of the school's classrooms. The building also housed offices and - formally on the ground floor after the Library had been moved in 2003 to the ARC - senior common rooms. It is named after the Augustinian Saint, Nicholas of Tolentino. The common rooms were refurbished to become extra classrooms and moved to the then newly constructed Moran House and Cameron House. The common rooms have now been relocated to the new Clancy Wing following 2017 upgrades. The Tolentine Wing joins to the Clancy Wing via a stairwell and a lift which is used only by students at the College who are injured.

=== Goold Wing ===
The Goold Wing – named after James Alipius Goold, the first-ever Augustinian to come to Australia and the first Archbishop of Melbourne – was added to the school in 1987. It was built to contain classrooms, music rooms, an auditorium, and (on the lower floor) staff facilities. In 2005 the second and third floors of the building underwent refurbishment, aimed to coincide with the construction of the new "Lecceto Arts Centre". As part of these upgrades, the auditorium was relocated to the Lecceto Arts Centre. The Goold Wing is currently being demolished and rebuilt as part of a major rebuilding project due to be completed in late 2019. The building was used primarily for Languages and Design and Technology. The Design and Technology Workshops have been (2019) relocated to the lower floor of the Brimson Centre replacing the ARC – the Augustine Resource Centre – which has been relocated to the Clancy/Mendel Wing.

=== Brimson Centre ===
The Brimson Centre is a two-storey building that was constructed in 2003 to provide the school with first-class indoor sports and gymnasium facilities. It was designed to house a full-size basketball court as well as many other indoor sports that require a hard-floor surface. The building has a large stage area and is also used to hold whole-school assemblies and productions. Underneath the gymnasium was the Augustine Resource Centre originally colloquially known as the ARC. This section of the Brimson Centre was designed to be the new library. The old library was located on the ground floor of the Tolentine Wing. The ARC was also home to several computer/technology areas and two seminar rooms. The Brimson Centre above the ARC was home to several offices, a weights room, a large industrial kitchen and originally the Principal's Office. The weights room has been reformed into the Monica Chapel, named after the mother of St Augustine, and moved to the Mary MacKillop Building. The Brimson Centre was named after the first Rector of the College - David Brimson OSA, .

=== Lecceto Arts Centre ===
The Lecceto Arts Centre was constructed in 2005 as a modern creative arts facility. Prior to its demolition and rebuild in 2019, it housed the music facilities, two computer rooms and a brand-new auditorium (the old auditorium was located in the "G-Block"). The building has a large landing which was often used by the school to hold casual lunches and presentations as well as classrooms adjoining to the Goold Wing that is primarily used for software and engineering classes. It was named after the Lecceto Monastery, in Rosia, Tuscany, an Augustinian monastery which dates back to the "Grand Union" of the Augustinian Order in 1256.

=== Good Counsel Wing ===
The original Good Counsel Wing - opened in 1995 and demolished in 2016 - was a u-shaped building located at the back of the College behind the Mendel Wing. It consisted of six classrooms that were used exclusively by the Primary School - years 5 and 6. When the new Clancy/Good Counsel building was opened, it was a three-level structure that houses a ground floor car-park and an all-purpose room named The Haven.

=== Old School Chapel ===
The Old School Chapel is the building located at the front of the school, alongside the main driveway. It was constructed in 1955 as a Church by the Manly Vale Parish and was the location of the first classes when the school opened in 1956. It was refurbished into classrooms primarily for the teaching of religion but has further been refurbished with a small stage for drama and the remaining classrooms used primarily for English/Drama due to this also being the location of the English and Drama staff offices. It also houses the only teacher toilet not located inside a building.

=== Moran and Cameron Houses (Previously Senior Study Centres) and Tolentine Park ===
Moran House and Cameron House are situated at the back of the Tolentine Wing. They were originally used as Senior Common Rooms and study centres for the Year 11 and Year 12 boys. The two individual free-standing Houses called Cameron House and Moran House are named after past rectors Ralph Cameron OSA and Joseph Moran OSA. They back on to the College grounds, and prior to the building program of 2016/17, were a special domain for the boys to focus on both study and exam preparation. The study rooms also contained kitchen areas for the students to use and were fitted with microwaves, fridges and ovens but have now been refurbished for use by staff of the Religion, History and Geography Departments. Tolentine Park is an outdoor area which includes three cricket practice nets and the facility to plug-in and uses an electric bowling machine.

=== Chalets (P Block) ===
2013 brought the introduction of four new demountable classrooms located behind the current Tolentine wing. The four classrooms can be accessed through Tolentine Park and the back doors of the metal/wood workrooms, and contain smart boards and air conditioning for an enhanced learning environment. As two of the classrooms are located more than 1.5 metres off the ground, a permanent concrete ramp allows for disabled access. These classrooms have now been demolished (2019) and replaced by the renewed reconstruction of the G Block.

=== Mendel wing (2017) ===
2016 brought the introduction of two new builds of which Mendel was one. The Clancy block was previously called the Mendel wing. The new Mendel wing contains 6 science classrooms, 6 Laboratories, has 2 seminar rooms and features a large storage facility for scientific equipment as well as a staff room. The building is organised so that the staff car park is on the ground floor and there are two levels of classrooms and an outdoor area above. The classrooms open out onto a paved area that is located directly above the carpark. this joins the wing to the primary school (Years 5-6). The building is joined to the Clancy wing via a two-storey bridge.

== Rectors of the College ==
1. The Rev'd David Brimson OSA (1956–1964)
2. The Rev'd Steve Moran OSA (1965–1967)
3. The Rev'd Ralph Cameron OSA (1968–1974)
4. The Rev'd Kevin Burman OSA (1975–1982)
5. The Rev'd David Austin OSA (1983–1993)

== Principals of the College ==
1. John O'Brien (1994–2001)
2. Tim Cleary (2001–2016)
3. Jonathan Byrne (2017–present)

== Augustinian friars at the College ==
The 40 Augustinian friars at St. Augustine's College over its history include:

- Rector David Austin (1983–1993, 1996)
- Anthony Banks (1985–1990, 2003—present)
- Rector David Brimson (1956–1965)
- Ronald Bopf (1957–1974)
- Patrick Bourke (1964, 1997–1998)
- Rector Kevin Burman (1975–1982)
- Rector Ralph Cameron (1958–1975)
- Roderick Cameron (1964–1984)
- Barry Clifford (1982–1984)
- Patrick Codd (1974–1984)
- Patrick Crilly O.S.A. (1965–1974)
- William Donlevy (1964)
- Michael Endicott (1970)
- Patrick Fahey (1959–1972)
- Tom Greally (1975–1987)
- Joe Hegarty (1961–1962)
- Peter Jones (1990–1992, 1994–1996, 1999–present)
- Noel Hackett (1975–1977)
- Peter Hayes (1961–1975)
- Patrick Love (1983)
- John McCall (1963–1983)
- Michael McMahon (1970)
- Jim Maguire (1962–1971)
- Paul Maloney (1967–1974)
- Laurence Mooney (1985–1988)
- Michael Morahan (1991–1994)
- Gerry Moran (1962–1964)
- Rector Steve Moran (1956–1969)
- David Murrin (1993)
- Tom Power (1958–1964)
- Michael Price (1956)
- Michael Slack (1979–1989)
- John Sullivan (1974–1982)
- Peter Tangey (1964–1978, 2007–present)
- Senan Ward (1975–1982, 1987–1989)
- John Paul Whelan (1962–1966, 1968–1979)
- Abel van der Veer (1964)
- Peter Wieneke (1982–1987)

== Notable alumni ==
=== Media, entertainment and the arts ===
- Harley Streten (Class of 2009) – a.k.a. Flume, producer, DJ, musician. Winner of four 2013 ARIA awards including Best Male Artist
- James Mathison (Class of 1995) – television presenter of Australian Idol and Channel [V]
- Dr Andrew Rochford (Class of 1997) – Doctor of Medicine, television presenter of Australian health show What's Good For You and The Living Room
- Hayden Quinn (Class of 2004) – winner TV reality cooking show Masterchef, TV personality
- William Singe (Class of 2010) – singer, songwriter known for his covers on YouTube. He was a member of The Collective from 2012 during The X Factor Australia, until February 2015
- Adrian Thomas (Class of 1989) – a.k.a. DJ Ajax, music producer and DJ
- Matthew White (Class of 1987) – TV sports presenter
- Mitch Thompson (Class of 2011) – singer, songwriter part of Country music duo Seaforth

=== Sport ===
- Matthew Barton (Class of 1997) – Australian tennis player; made his Grand Slam singles debut at Wimbledon in 2016
- Michael Blake (Class of 1978) – played rugby league for the Manly-Warringah Sea Eagles, the Canberra Raiders and South Sydney Rabbitohs
- Philip Blake (Class of 1981) – played rugby league halfback for the Manly-Warringah Sea Eagles
- Christopher Cairns (Class of 1975) – Olympian yachting winning a bronze medal in the Tornado Class at the 1984 Olympic Games in Los Angeles
- Phil Daley (Class of 1981) – played rugby league for the Manly Warringah Sea Eagles, also represented The Blues in the State of Origin and the Kanagaroos in the 1980s
- Brad Dalton (Class of 1976) – represented Australia at the 1984 Olympic Games in Los Angeles and at Seoul in 1988. He went on to play for the Sydney Kings in the National Basketball League in Australia
- Mark Dalton (Class of 1982) – represented the Sydney Kings in the National Basketball League in Australia
- Jack Edwards (Class 2017) – played cricket for New South Wales Sheffield team and BBL team – Sydney Sixers
- Mickey Edwards (Class 2012) – played cricket for New South Wales Sheffield team and BBL team - Sydney Sixers
- Steve Hegarty (Class of 1979) – played for the Manly-Warringah Sea Eagles in 1984 taking over fullback and goal kicking duties from Graham Eadie
- Albert Hopoate (Class of 2017) – player for Manly Warringah Sea Eagles, Canberra Raiders and Warrington Wolves
- Lehi Hopoate – (Class of 2023) plays Rugby league for the Manly Warringah Sea Eagles
- Jason King (Class of 1998) – played Rugby League prop for the Manly-Warringah Sea Eagles
- Sam Lane (Class of 2009) – played for the Super Rugby team Queensland Reds
- Lucas Neill (Class of 1995) – captain of the Australian National Association football (soccer) team, played for A-League club Sydney F.C.
- Rory O'Connor (Class of 2012) – played for the Super Rugby teams Melbourne Rebels and the NSW Waratahs
- Matt Philip (Class of 2014) – Player for the Melbourne Rebels, and the Wallabies.
- Matt Shirvington (Class of 1996) – six-time 100m Australian Sprint Champion. Currently sports commentator on FOX TV
- Joey Walsh – (Class of 2024) plays Rugby league for the Manly Warringah Sea Eagles
- Jacob Preston – (Class of 2018) plays Rugby League for the Canterbury-Bankstown Bulldogs

== See also ==
- List of Catholic schools in New South Wales
- Catholic education in Australia

== Bibliography ==
- Arneil, Stan (1992). Out Where the Dead Men Lie: The Augustinians in Australia 1838–1992. Brookvale: Augustinian Press. ISBN 0-949826-03-0.
- Brown, Peter (1967). Augustine of Hippo. University of California Press. ISBN 9780520014114.
- School Diary. St. Augustine's College. 2006.
- Yearbooks. St. Augustine's College. 1975–1980.
