= Tim Lang =

Tim Lang or Timothy Lang may refer to:

- Tim Lang (nutritionist) (born 1948), English professor of food policy
- Timothy P. Lang, New Hampshire politician
- Tim Lang (cricketer) (born 1981), Australian cricketer
- Tim Lang (basketball) (born 1985), Australian basketball player
