= NBL Rookie of the Year Award =

Australasia basketball award

The National Basketball League Rookie of the Year was an annual National Basketball League (NBL) award given between 1983 and 2022 to the top rookie of the regular season. Traditionally for a player to be considered for Rookie of the Year, they must have been an unrestricted non-import player without previous professional experience. This rule was relaxed in 2020 when American Next Star LaMelo Ball was named Rookie of the Year.

The award was discontinued in 2023 following the introduction of the Next Generation Award.

== Winners ==
Year	Player	Nationality	Team
1983	Jamie Kennedy	Australia	Canberra Cannons
1984	Andrew Gaze	Australia	Melbourne Tigers
1985	Mike McKay	Australia	Adelaide 36ers
1986	Steve Lunardon	Australia	Nunawading Spectres
1987	Greg Hubbard	Australia	Illawarra Hawks
1988	Shane Heal	Australia	Brisbane Bullets
1989	Justin Withers	Australia	Illawarra Hawks
1990	Justin Cass	Australia	Hobart Tassie Devils
1991	Andrew Vlahov	Australia	Perth Wildcats
1992	Lachlan Armfield	Australia	Canberra Cannons
1993	Chris Blakemore	Australia	Adelaide 36ers
1994	Sam Mackinnon	Australia	South East Melbourne Magic
1995	John Rillie	Australia	Brisbane Bullets
1996	Scott McGregor	Australia	Newcastle Falcons
1997	Matthew Nielsen	Australia	Sydney Kings
1998	David Smith	Australia	North Melbourne Giants
1998–99	Damien Ryan	Australia	Canberra Cannons
1999–2000	Derek Moore	Australia	Sydney Kings
2000–01	Axel Dench	Australia	Wollongong Hawks
2001–02	Travis Lane	Australia	Sydney Kings
2002–03	Gary Boodnikoff	Australia	Sydney Kings
2003–04	Steven Marković	Australia	West Sydney Razorbacks
2004–05	Brad Newley	Australia	Townsville Crocodiles
2005–06	Mark Worthington	Australia	Sydney Kings
2006–07	Joe Ingles	Australia	South Dragons
2007–08	Nathan Jawai	Australia	Cairns Taipans
2008–09	Aaron Bruce	Australia	Adelaide 36ers
2009–10	Jesse Wagstaff	Australia	Perth Wildcats
2010–11	Ben Madgen	Australia	Sydney Kings
2011–12	Anatoly Bose	Kazakhstan	Sydney Kings
2012–13	Cameron Gliddon	Australia	Cairns Taipans
2013–14	Tom Jervis	Australia	Perth Wildcats
2014–15	Angus Brandt	Australia	Sydney Kings
2015–16	Nick Kay	Australia	Townsville Crocodiles
2016–17	Anthony Drmic	Australia	Adelaide 36ers
2017–18	Isaac Humphries	Australia	Sydney Kings
2018–19	Harry Froling	Australia	Adelaide 36ers
2019–20	LaMelo Ball	United States	Illawarra Hawks
2020–21	Josh Giddey	Australia	Adelaide 36ers
2021–22	Bul Kuol	South Sudan	Cairns Taipans
