= Brad Dalton =

Australian former basketball player

Personal information
- Born: 12 September 1959 (age 67) Sydney
- Listed height: 203 cm (6 ft 8 in)
- Listed weight: 104 kg (229 lb)

Career information
- High school: St Augustine's College
- Playing career: 1979–1991
- Position: Power forward / Centre
- Number: 14

Career history
- 1979–1980: City of Sydney Astronauts
- 1981–1982: West Adelaide Bearcats
- 1983: Sydney Supersonics
- 1984–1987: Geelong Cats
- 1988–1991: Sydney Kings

Career highlights
- Australian Basketball Hall of Fame (2019); NBL champion (1982)

Bradley Dalton (born 12 September 1959) is an Australian former basketball player, who played for the City of Sydney Astronauts (1979–1980), West Adelaide Bearcats (1981–1982), Sydney Supersonics (1983), Geelong Supercats (1984–1987) and the Sydney Kings (1988–1991) in the NBL.

== Early life and family ==
Born in Sydney, Dalton attended St. Augustine's College in Brookvale, a suburb on the Northern Beaches of Sydney. He is the older brother of former NBL player and Olympian, Mark Dalton and brother of Karen Dalton, who also represented Australia at the 1984 and 1988 Summer Olympics.

== Career ==
Dalton, a 6-foot-8-inch (203 cm) Power forward who could also play at Centre, won the NBL championship in 1982 with the West Adelaide Bearcats, a team that included 1982 NBL MVP Al Green, future three-time league MVP Leroy Loggins, Boomers Peter Ali and Ray Wood, as well as the NBL's inaugural MVP winner in 1979, player/coach Ken Richardson. The Bearcats defeated the Geelong Supercats 80–74 in the Grand Final held at the Broadmeadow Basketball Stadium in Newcastle.

== International ==
Dalton represented Australia at the 1984 Summer Olympic Games in Los Angeles and again in 1988 in Seoul.
