= Mark Dalton (basketball) =

Australian former basketball player

Personal information
- Born: 9 November 1964 (age 61) Sydney, Australia
- Listed height: 198 cm (6 ft 6 in)
- Listed weight: 100 kg (220 lb)

Career information
- High school: St Augustine's College (Sydney, New South Wales)
- Playing career: 1984–1999
- Position: Small forward

Career history
- 1984–1985: Canberra Cannons
- 1986–1987: Geelong Cats
- 1988–1995: Sydney Kings
- 1996–1997: Brisbane Bullets
- 1998–1999: Wollongong Hawks

Career highlights
- NBL champion (1984); Sydney Kings 25th Anniversary Team (2013)

Mark Dalton (born 9 November 1964) is an Australian former professional basketball player who played in the National Basketball League (NBL) from 1984 to 1999.

== Early life ==
Dalton attended St. Augustine's College in Brookvale, New South Wales. He was an Australian Institute of Sport scholarship holder (1982–1984) and became the first AIS men's player selected to play for Australia at the Olympics.

== Career ==
After finishing at the AIS in 1984, Dalton, a 6-foot-6-inch (198 cm) Small forward, played in the NBL for the Canberra Cannons (1984–1985), Geelong Supercats (1986–1987), Sydney Kings (1988–1995), Brisbane Bullets (1996–1997), and Illawarra Hawks (1998–1999).

On 10 October 2013, Dalton was named in the Sydney Kings 25th Anniversary Team.

== International ==
Dalton represented the Australian boomers at the 1984 Olympic Games in Los Angeles and at the 1986 FIBA World Championship in Spain.

== Personal life ==
Dalton is the brother of two other Australian basketball players, Brad Dalton and Karen Dalton. His son Callum has played in the NBL for the Brisbane Bullets and Melbourne United.
