= Chris Blakemore =

Australian basketball player

Personal information
- Born: 17 May 1974 (age 52) Adelaide, Australia
- Listed height: 196 cm (6 ft 5 in)
- Listed weight: 103 kg (227 lb)

Career information
- Playing career: 1991–2002
- Position: Forward

Career history
- 1991–1992: Australian Institute of Sport
- 1993: West Adelaide Bearcats
- 1993–1995: Adelaide 36ers
- 1996–1997: Canberra Cannons
- 1998: Brisbane Bullets
- 2001–2002: Albury Wodonga Bandits

Career highlights
- NBL Most Improved Player (1994); NBL Rookie of the Year (1993)

Chris Blakemore (born 17 May 1974) is an Australian former professional basketball player.

Blakemore was born in Adelaide and raised in Whyalla, South Australia. He attended the Australian Institute of Sport (AIS) and played for the AIS men's team in the South East Australian Basketball League (SEABL) from 1991 to 1992. He played for the West Adelaide Bearcats of the SA State League in 1993. Blakemore began his professional career with the Adelaide 36ers of the National Basketball League (NBL) and was named the NBL Rookie of the Year in 1993. Blakemore was selected for the NBL Most Improved Player Award in 1994. His performance dropped during the 1995 NBL season and culminated with an incident where Blakemore elbowed Perth Wildcats player Martin Cattalini during a game, resulting in his suspension through the playoffs.

Blakemore was subsequently released by the Adelaide 36ers and he signed with the Canberra Cannons. He was hampered by a knee injury during the 1996 season and only appeared in three games totalling five minutes. In 1998, Blakemore signed with the Brisbane Bullets for what would be his final season in the NBL.

In 2001–02, Blakemore played in the Australian Basketball Association (ABA) for the Albury Wodonga Bandits.
