= NBL Most Improved Player Award =

The National Basketball League Most Improved Player is an annual National Basketball League (NBL) award given since the 1988 NBL season to an up-and-coming player who has made a dramatic improvement from the previous season. As of the 2023–24 season, the head coach, assistant coach and captain of each team vote for the Most Improved Player. Voters are not allowed to vote for players from their own team.

== Winners ==
Year	Player	Nationality	Team
1988	Darren Lucas	Australia	Eastside Melbourne Spectres
1989	Mark Bradtke	Australia	Adelaide 36ers
1990	Shane Heal	Australia	Geelong Supercats
1991	Andrew Parkinson	Australia	Southern Melbourne Saints
1992	Andrew Svaldenis	Australia	Hobart Tassie Devils
1993	Scott Ninnis	Australia	Adelaide 36ers
1994	Chris Blakemore	Australia	Adelaide 36ers
1995	Tonny Jensen	Australia	Newcastle Falcons
1996	Chris Anstey	Australia	South East Melbourne Magic
1997	Ben Pepper	Australia	Newcastle Falcons
1998	Ben Melmeth	Australia	Newcastle Falcons
1998–99	C. J. Bruton	Australia	Wollongong Hawks
1999–2000	Andrew Goodwin	Australia	Townsville Crocodiles
2000–01	James Harvey	Australia	Perth Wildcats
2001–02	Wade Helliwell	Australia	Brisbane Bullets
2002–03	Matt Burston	Australia	Perth Wildcats
2003–04	Geordie Cullen	Australia	Hunter Pirates
2004–05	Peter Crawford	Australia	Perth Wildcats
2005–06	Gary Boodnikoff	Australia	Cairns Taipans
2006–07	Liam Rush	Australia	West Sydney Razorbacks
2007–08	Cameron Tragardh	Australia	Wollongong Hawks
2008–09	Matthew Knight	Australia	Sydney Spirit
2009–10	Anthony Petrie	Australia	Gold Coast Blaze
2010–11	Oscar Forman	Australia	Wollongong Hawks
2011–12	Daniel Johnson	Australia	Adelaide 36ers
2012–13	Ben Madgen	Australia	Sydney Kings
2013–14	Nate Tomlinson	Australia	Melbourne Tigers
2014–15	Todd Blanchfield	Australia	Townsville Crocodiles
2015–16	Clint Steindl	Australia	Townsville Crocodiles
2016–17	Nathan Sobey	Australia	Adelaide 36ers
2017–18	Shea Ili	New Zealand	New Zealand Breakers
2018–19	Reuben Te Rangi	New Zealand	Brisbane Bullets
2019–20	Will Magnay	Australia	Brisbane Bullets
2020–21	Sam Froling	Australia	Illawarra Hawks
2021–22	Keanu Pinder	Australia	Cairns Taipans
2022–23	Keanu Pinder (2)	Australia	Cairns Taipans
2023–24	Sean Macdonald	Australia	Tasmania JackJumpers
2024–25	Tyrell Harrison	New Zealand	Brisbane Bullets
2025–26	Flynn Cameron	New Zealand	Adelaide 36ers
