= Luke Nevill =

Australian basketball player

Personal information
- Born: 19 February 1986 (age 40) Perth, Western Australia, Australia
- Listed height: 7 ft 2 in (2.18 m)
- Listed weight: 265 lb (120 kg)

Career information
- High school: Kell (Marietta, Georgia)
- College: Utah (2005–2009)
- NBA draft: 2009: undrafted
- Playing career: 2009–2018
- Position: Centre

Career history
- 2009–2010: Utah Flash
- 2010–2011: Melbourne Tigers
- 2011: BC Triumph Lyubertsy
- 2011–2012: Perth Wildcats
- 2012–2013: Townsville Crocodiles
- 2013: Kalamunda Eastern Suns
- 2013–2014: Taiwan Mobile Clouded Leopards
- 2014: Kalamunda Eastern Suns
- 2014–2015: Wollongong Hawks
- 2015–2017: Bank of Taiwan
- 2017: Al Rayan
- 2017–2018: Yulon Luxgen Dinos

Career highlights
- SBL scoring champion (2013); MWC Player of the Year (2009); MWC Defensive Player of the Year (2009); MWC All-Defensive Team (2009); First-team All-MWC (2009); Second-team All-MWC (2008); Third-team All-MWC (2007)

Luke Alexander Nevill (born 19 February 1986) is an Australian former professional basketball player. He played college basketball for the University of Utah.

== Early life ==
Nevill was born in Perth, Western Australia, where he played as a junior for the Stirling Senators. In 2002 and 2003, he was an Australian Institute of Sport Junior All-Star selection.

=== High school ===
In 2003, Nevill moved to the United States to attend Kell High School in Marietta, Georgia. As an exchange student in 2003–04, he averaged 17.6 points, 8.9 rebounds, 3.7 blocked shots and 2.5 assists per game.

In April 2004, he signed a national letter of intent with the Utah men's basketball program.

== College career ==
In his freshman season with Utah in 2005–06, Nevill earned honorable mention all-Mountain West Conference honors. In 29 games (12 starts), he averaged 11.6 points and 6.6 rebounds per game.

In his sophomore season, he was named to the NABC All-District 8 second team, USBWA All-District 13 second team and all-Mountain West Conference third team. In 29 games, he averaged 16.8 points, 7.7 rebounds, 1.6 assists and 1.1 blocks per game.

In his junior season, he was again named to the NABC All-District 8 second team, USBWA All-District 13 second team and all-Mountain West Conference second team. On 5 January 2008, in a game against the Air Force, he became just the 19th Ute to score 1,000 points and grab 500 rebounds. In 33 games, he averaged 15.2 points, 6.7 rebounds, 1.3 assists and 1.6 blocks per game.

In his senior season, he helped lead the Utes to the NCAA Tournament. At the conclusion of the season, he was named the Mountain West Conference Player of the Year and Defensive Player of the Year, as well as earning all-Mountain West Conference first team and Associated Press honorable mention All-American honors. In 34 games, he averaged 16.8 points, 9.0 rebounds, 1.3 assists and 2.7 blocks per game.

== Professional career ==
=== 2009–10 season ===
After going undrafted in the 2009 NBA draft, Nevill joined the New Orleans Hornets for the 2009 NBA Summer League. In September 2009, he signed with the Cleveland Cavaliers. However, he was later waived by the Cavaliers on 19 October 2009.

In November 2009, he was acquired by the Utah Flash of the NBA D-League. On 3 December 2009, he was waived by the Flash due to visa issues. He was reacquired by the Flash on 14 December after the matter was dealt with. He appeared in 48 games in total, starting 43 of them. In the regular season, he played 45 games and averaged 11.9 points, 5.5 rebounds, 1.4 assists and 1.2 blocks per game. He also appeared in 3 playoff games, averaging 7.7 points, 5.0 rebounds and 1.0 blocks per game.

=== 2010–11 season ===
In May 2010, Nevill signed with the Melbourne Tigers for the 2010–11 NBL season. On 4 February 2011, he was released by the Tigers to sign with BC Triumph Lyubertsy of Russia for the rest of the season.

=== 2011–12 season ===
On 14 September 2011, Nevill signed with the Perth Wildcats for the 2011–12 NBL season. In 34 games for the Wildcats, he averaged 9.5 points, 4.9 rebounds, 1.5 assists and 1.1 blocks per game.

=== 2012–13 season ===
In July 2012, Nevill joined the Orlando Magic for the Orlando Summer League and the Minnesota Timberwolves for the Las Vegas Summer League. On 18 September 2012, he signed with the Indiana Pacers. However, he was later waived by the Pacers on 22 October 2012.

On 19 November 2012, he signed with the Townsville Crocodiles for the rest of the 2012–13 NBL season. On 30 November 2012, he made his debut for the Crocodiles, helping them win their first game of the season after starting the year 0–10 with a 75–73 home win over the Adelaide 36ers, though he only scored 4 points in just under 14 minutes of game time.

In April 2013, Nevill joined the Kalamunda Eastern Suns for the rest of the 2013 State Basketball League season.

=== 2013–14 season ===
In October 2013, Nevill signed with the Taiwan Mobile Clouded Leopards for the 2013–14 Super Basketball League season.

On 8 May 2014, he re-joined the Kalamunda Eastern Suns for the rest of the 2014 State Basketball League season.

=== 2014–15 season ===
On 29 September 2014, Nevill signed with the Wollongong Hawks, becoming the tallest player in club history.

=== 2015–16 season ===
In November 2015, Nevill joined Bank of Taiwan of the Super Basketball League. In 32 games for the club in 2015–16, he averaged 20.6 points, 12.9 rebounds, 2.0 assists and 1.9 blocks per game.

=== 2016–17 season ===
Nevill returned to Bank of Taiwan for the 2016–17 season and averaged 17.3 points, 15.1 rebounds, 1.2 assists and 1.1 blocks per game.

In May 2017, Nevill joined Al Rayan of the Qatari Basketball League.

=== 2017–18 season ===
In December 2017, Nevill joined Yulon Luxgen Dinos of the Super Basketball League.

== National team career ==
Nevill made his international debut for the Australian Boomers at the 2013 FIBA Oceania Championship, where he helped the Boomers to a 2–0 series win over the New Zealand Tall Blacks. Nevill, who was the back up centre to former NBA player David Andersen, averaged 5 points, 6 rebounds and 1 block per game in the series and led the Boomers with 6 rebounds in Game 2 at the AIS Arena in Canberra.

== Personal ==
Nevill is the son of Peter and Joyce Nevill, and has a twin brother named Sam.
