= Wade Helliwell =

Australian basketball player

Personal information
- Born: 10 May 1978 (age 47) Melbourne, Victoria, Australia
- Listed height: 211 cm (6 ft 11 in)
- Listed weight: 118 kg (260 lb)

Career information
- College: Charlotte (1999–2000)
- Playing career: 2000–2012
- Position: Centre

Career history
- 2000–2004: Brisbane Bullets
- 2003: Panionios B.C.
- 2004–2006: Pallacanestro Virtus Roma
- 2006: Montepaschi Siena
- 2006–2008: Solsonica Rieti
- 2008–2009: Fabi Shoes
- 2009–2010: PAOK
- 2010–2011: Melbourne Tigers
- 2011–2012: Adelaide 36ers

Career highlights
- NBL Most Improved Player (2002)

Wade Helliwell (born 10 May 1978) is an Australian former professional basketball player.

== Early life ==
Helliwell was born in Melbourne, Victoria.

== Career ==
Helliwell completed a stint at the Australian Institute of Sport before going on to a season of US College basketball attending the University of North Carolina at Charlotte playing for the Charlotte 49ers in 2000. He played 31 games for the 49ers averaging 2.5 points, 2.4 rebounds and 0.4 blocks per game.

After his season with in Charlotte, Helliwell played in Australia after signing with the Brisbane Bullets for the 2000–01 NBL season. He would play 104 games for the Bullets, winning the NBL's Most Improved Player award in 2002 when he posted career best stats of 13.4 points, 6.2 rebounds and 0.5 blocks in 30 games.

After leaving the Bullets following the 2003–04 season Helliwell went on to spend the next six years playing in Greece and Italy at the top level before returning home to Australia in 2010 to link up with his hometown club, the Melbourne Tigers for the 2010–11 NBL season. He would play 28 games for the Tigers during the season, seeing limited court time.

On 17 August 2011 it was announced that the 6-foot-11-inch (211 cm), 118 kg Helliwell, now in the veteran class at age 33, had signed to play for the Adelaide 36ers in the 2011–12 season as back up to emerging centre Daniel Johnson giving the 36ers two near 7-foot tall centres (Johnson is also 6'11" but stands at 212 cm.) While no longer seen as an offensive threat Helliwell has gained a reputation among 36ers fans for being a good defender, often being called on by 36ers coach Marty Clarke to stop bigger opposition centres from scoring.

Helliwell retired from playing following the 2011–12 NBL season.
