= Tim Lang (basketball) =

Australian basketball player

Timothy Lang
Personal information
- Born: 9 November 1985 (age 41) Melbourne, Victoria, Australia
- Listed height: 206 cm (6 ft 9 in)
- Listed weight: 113 kg (249 lb)

Career information
- High school: Overnewton Anglican CC (Melbourne, Victoria)
- College: Stetson (2006–2009)
- NBA draft: 2009: undrafted
- Playing career: 2004–present
- Position: Centre

Career history
- 2004–2006: Keilor Thunder
- 2009–2016: Kilsyth Cobras
- 2009–2010: Melbourne Tigers
- 2010–2011: Erdgas Ehingen/Urspringschule
- 2011–2012: Melbourne Tigers
- 2017–2019: Dandenong Rangers
- 2021–2024: Kilsyth Cobras

Career highlights
- German ProB champion (2011); SEABL All-Star Team (2011)

Timothy John Lang (born 9 November 1985) is an Australian former professional basketball player. He played three years of college basketball in the United States for the Stetson Hatters before playing the majority of his career in the South East Australian Basketball League (SEABL) and NBL1 South. He also had two stints in the National Basketball League (NBL) with the Melbourne Tigers and won a championship in Germany with Erdgas Ehingen/Urspringschule.

== Early life and career ==
Lang was born in Melbourne, Victoria, where he attended Overnewton Anglican Community College. He also played for the Keilor Thunder in the Big V Division One between 2004 and 2006.

On 1 June 2006, Lang signed a National Letter of Intent to play college basketball for Stetson University in the United States.

== College career ==
Lang joined the Stetson Hatters men's basketball program for the 2006–07 season with sophomore eligibility. In 31 games, he made six starts and averaged 5.4 points and 3.5 rebounds in 19.2 minutes per game. He had a 20-point game during the season.

As a junior in 2007–08, Lang appeared in all 32 games with 22 starts, averaging 4.3 points and 2.8 rebounds in 15.1 minutes per game.

As a senior in 2008–09, Lang appeared in all 30 games with 27 starts, averaging 6.5 points and 5.2 rebounds in 21.6 minutes per game. He finished his three-year career at Stetson with a total of 81 blocked shots, placing him seventh all-time for the Hatters.

== Professional career ==
Lang debuted for the Kilsyth Cobras of the South East Australian Basketball League (SEABL) in 2009. He subsequently joined the Melbourne Tigers of the National Basketball League (NBL) for the 2009–10 season. He played in 10 games for the Tigers between 30 September and 21 November.

After returning to the Cobras for the 2010 SEABL season, Lang moved to Germany for the 2010–11 season, where he joined Erdgas Ehingen/Urspringschule of the ProB. The team won the ProB championship.

Lang re-joined the Cobras for the 2011 season and earned selection to the SEABL All-Star Team.

On 25 November 2011, Lang signed with the Melbourne Tigers for the rest of the 2011–12 NBL season following a hamstring injury to Matt Burston. In 15 games, he averaged 1.2 points in 5.1 minutes per game.

Lang continued with the Cobras in 2012, 2013, 2014, 2015, and 2016. He helped the team reach the SEABL South Conference Grand Final in 2014, and played his 200th SEABL game in 2016, becoming the fifteenth Cobra to have his jersey hung up at Kilsyth's Hugh McMenamin Court.

Lang joined the Dandenong Rangers for the 2017 SEABL season. He helped the Rangers reach the SEABL South Conference Grand Final, where they defeated the Ballarat Miners. The Rangers went on to lose to the Mount Gambier Pioneers in the SEABL Grand Final.

Lang had a pre-season stint with the Perth Wildcats in the lead up to the 2017–18 NBL season.

Lang continued with the Rangers for the 2018 SEABL season and 2019 NBL1 season.

Lang returned to the Kilsyth Cobras, now in the NBL1 South, for the 2021 NBL1 season, where he was named team captain. With the Cobras in the 2022 season, he played his 300th SEABL/NBL1 game. Early in the Cobras' 2023 season, Lang suffered a season-ending knee injury. He played his final season in 2024, announcing his retirement after 12 seasons and 258 club games for the Cobras.
