= Andrew Parkinson (basketball) =

Australian basketball player (born 1967)

Personal information
- Born: 21 September 1967 (age 59)
- Listed height: 195 cm (6 ft 5 in)
- Listed weight: 95 kg (209 lb)

Career information
- Playing career: 1989–1998
- Position: Shooting guard / small forward

Career history
- 1989–1990: Geelong Supercats
- 1991: Southern Melbourne Saints
- 1992–1998: South East Melbourne Magic

Career highlights
- 2× NBL champion (1992, 1996); NBL Most Improved Player (1991)

Andrew Parkinson (born 21 September 1967) is an Australian former professional basketball player. He played ten seasons in the National Basketball League (NBL) with the Geelong Supercats (1989–1990), Southern Melbourne Saints (1991) and South East Melbourne Magic (1992–1998).

In 1991, Parkinson won the NBL Most Improved Player Award. In 1994, he was the NBL's Free Throw Percentage leader with 91.0% (131/144). He won two NBL championships with the Magic, the first in 1992 and the second in 1996.
