= Penrith Panthers (basketball) =

- History: NBL1 East (2023–2026)
- Location: Penrith, New South Wales
- Team colors: Black, cyan
- President: Kurt Watts
- Championships: 0
- Website: penrithbasketball.com.au

Penrith Panthers is a former NBL1 East club based in Sydney, New South Wales. The club fielded a team in both the Men's and Women's NBL1 East between 2023 and 2026. The club is a division of Penrith & Districts Basketball Association (PDBA), the major administrative basketball organisation in the region.

== Club history ==
Penrith & Districts Basketball Association (PDBA) was formed in 1987. The Panthers competed in the Waratah League, which was established in 1991. Between 1996 and 2002, the Panthers men competed in the South East Australian Basketball League (SEABL), finishing as high as second in the East Conference in 2000. The women's team also had a one-season stint in the SEABL in 2001.

Following the 2015 Waratah League season, the Panthers withdrew from Championship Division due to high costs. They returned to the Championship Division in 2018.

In November 2022, the Panthers joined the NBL1 East for the 2023 NBL1 season.

In September 2026, the Panthers withdrew from the 2027 NBL1 East season, with an aim of returning in 2028.

== Stadium ==
Between 1988 and October 2025, Penrith & Districts Basketball Association operated out of the Penrith Valley Regional Sports Centre (PVRSC) in Cambridge Park. However, following a commercial dispute between PDBA and PVRSC, the association began operating out of several stadiums including high schools. In the 2026 NBL1 season, the Panthers played home games at Minto Indoor Sports Centre, Hawkesbury Indoor Stadium and Blacktown Leisure Centre.
