= Tommy Greer =

Australian basketball player

South East Melbourne Phoenix
- Title: CEO
- League: NBL

Personal information
- Born: 29 December 1983 (age 42) Melbourne, Victoria, Australia
- Listed height: 200 cm (6 ft 7 in)
- Listed weight: 95 kg (209 lb)

Career information
- College: Augusta (2003–2004); Nova Southeastern (2004–2005)
- Playing career: 2005–2014
- Position: Small forward / power forward
- Number: 5

Career history
- 2005–2014: Melbourne Tigers

Career highlights
- 2× NBL champion (2006, 2008); Peach Belt Freshman of the Year (2004)

Tommy Greer (born 29 December 1983) is an Australian former professional basketball player, and former CEO of the South East Melbourne Phoenix of the National Basketball League (NBL). Greer played college basketball for Augusta State University and Nova Southeastern University and played his entire professional career for the Melbourne Tigers.

== Early life ==
Greer was born in Melbourne, Victoria.

== Basketball career ==
=== College ===
In 2003–04, Greer attended Augusta State University where he was named the Peach Belt Conference and Augusta State Freshman of the Year after he averaged 9.9 points and a team-high 5.3 rebounds per game. Greer then transferred to Nova Southeastern University for 2004–05 and led the team with 11.2 points and 4.9 rebounds per game in a solid sophomore season. He played in all 28 games, starting 27, which led the team for starts and appearances.

=== Melbourne Tigers ===
Greer made his NBL debut on 3 September 2005 for Melbourne against the Wollongong Hawks. He won a championship with the Tigers in his rookie season and was part of the championship winning Tigers again in 2008. He was also awarded the Tigers Most Improved Player in 2007–08.

In September 2013, Greer tore his Pectoralis tendon and was sidelined for three months. On 12 April 2014, Greer announced his retirement from basketball to pursue off-court career opportunities.

=== Post-playing career ===
In May 2015, Greer was appointed Melbourne United's basketball operations manager.

In August 2018, Greer was appointed general manager of the South East Melbourne Phoenix. He was elevated to the position of CEO for their inaugural season in the NBL in 2019–20. On 29 October 2024, it was announced that he had resigned from his position as CEO, with his final day being 1 December 2024.
