= Matt Burston =

Australian basketball player

Personal information
- Born: 25 November 1982 (age 43) Perth, Western Australia, Australia
- Listed height: 211 cm (6 ft 11 in)
- Listed weight: 103 kg (227 lb)

Career information
- High school: Christ Church Grammar School (Perth, Western Australia)
- Playing career: 2000–2016
- Position: Centre / power forward

Career history
- 2000–2006: Perth Wildcats
- 2006–2009: South Dragons
- 2009: Al Arabi Club Doha
- 2009–2010: Adelaide 36ers
- 2010–2013: Melbourne Tigers
- 2011: Al Arabi Club Doha
- 2013: Al Rayyan Doha
- 2013–2016: Cairns Taipans

Career highlights
- Qatar Emir Cup champion (2013); NBL champion (2009); NBL Most Improved Player (2003); 3× SBL champion (2001–2002); SBL Rookie of the Year (2000)

Matthew Llewellyn Burston (born 25 November 1982) is an Australian former professional basketball player. He played 16 seasons in the National Basketball League (NBL). He has also played in the State Basketball League for the Perry Lakes Hawks, and has spent time in the Qatari Basketball League and the Big V.

== Early life ==
Burston was born in Perth, Western Australia.

== Career ==
Burston debuted in the NBL for the Perth Wildcats during the 2000–01 season, and played for them until 2006. In 2003, he won the NBL Most Improved Player Award.

In April 2006, Burston signed a one-year deal with the South Dragons. Burston spent much of the 2006–07 season injured, playing only a handful of games. He remained with the Dragons for two more seasons and was a member of the 2009 championship-winning team.

On 22 June 2009, Burston signed with the Adelaide 36ers for the 2009–10 NBL season.

In 2010, Burston moved back to Melbourne and signed with the Tigers where he spent three seasons. In 2013, while playing in Qatar for Al Rayyan, Burston and his team won the Emir Cup.

On 25 July 2013, Burston signed a one-year deal with the Cairns Taipans. On 30 May 2014, he re-signed with the Taipans on a two-year deal. On 5 August 2016, the Taipans parted ways with Burston after not offering him a new contract for the 2016–17 season.
