= Sydney Kings =

Australian men's basketball team

- 2026–27 Sydney Kings season
- League: NBL
- Founded: 1987; 39 years ago
- History: Sydney Kings; 1988–2008; 2010–present
- Arena: Afterpay Arena
- Capacity: 18,200
- Location: Sydney, New South Wales
- Team colours: Purple, gold, white, black
- General manager: James Newman
- Head coach: Brian Goorjian
- Team captain: Xavier Cooks
- Ownership: Hoops Capital Pty Ltd
- Championships: 6 (2003, 2004, 2005, 2022, 2023, 2026)
- Website: Sydney Kings
Home	Away

The Sydney Kings are an Australian men's professional basketball team competing in the National Basketball League (NBL). The team is based in Sydney, New South Wales, and play their home games at Afterpay Arena in Sydney Olympic Park. The Kings were formed from a merger between the West Sydney Westars and the Sydney SuperSonics in October 1987. The Kings have won six NBL championships in 2003, 2004, 2005, 2022, 2023 and 2026. They were the first team to win three consecutive championships in the NBL and currently sit tied for second with Melbourne United (six) and behind the Perth Wildcats (ten) for championships won.

== History ==
=== 1988–2002: First 15 years ===
The Kings were formed from a merger between the West Sydney Westars and the Sydney Supersonics in October 1987. The team adopted the purple-and-gold colours traditionally linked with the most winning team in the NBA during the 1980s, the Los Angeles Lakers.

Before the merger, no Sydney-based teams had ever made the final four in NBL competition. That changed in 1989, when the Kings finished fifth with a 15–9 record and advanced to the semi-finals with a 2–1 win over the Melbourne Tigers. After splitting their first two games in the semi-finals, the Kings were humiliated by the Canberra Cannons 142–82 in the series-deciding third game.

Sydney made the playoffs in 1990, losing in the first round to the Brisbane Bullets. In 1992, led by imports Dwayne McClain (who was named to the All-NBL First Team) and Ken McClary (ranked 5th in the league in rebounds), the Kings finished second on the ladder. This time they advanced to the semi-finals and were beaten by the Tigers, who would eventually lose to the South East Melbourne Magic in the championship series.

Over the next few years the Kings, despite the rich pockets of private owner Mike Wrublewski, earned a reputation for being chronic under-achievers. The team featured high-profile players like Leon Trimmingham, Mario Donaldson, Dean Uthoff and Phil Smyth during the mid-90s but they failed to make the playoffs in 1993 or 1995, and were eliminated in the first round in 1994 and 1996. The team soon received the nickname of 'The Violet Crumbles', a popular chocolate bar sold in a purple wrapper; the joke being that the team was wrapped in purple and shattered under pressure. 'The Cardiac Kids' was another tag, for the team's frequency in getting involved in close, thrilling games.

After their 1996 elimination, the Kings would not make the NBL playoffs again until 2001, when they made it to the first round before being eliminated by the Townsville Crocodiles. Australian Olympic team guard Shane Heal was recruited to lead the team, and he finished second in the league in scoring average, behind Olympic teammate Andrew Gaze. Heal finished third in scoring average in the 2001–02 season, but the Kings again failed to make the playoffs.

=== 2003–2008: First championship era ===
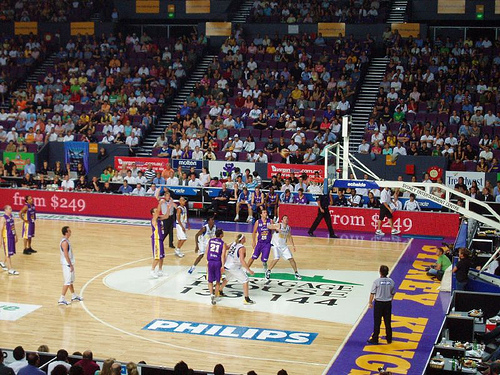
Sydney Kings and Brisbane Bullets at the Sydney Entertainment Centre, Sydney

For the 2002–03 season, Heal was joined by talented imports Chris Williams and Kavossy Franklin. The team also welcomed the NBL's all-time leader in coaching victories, Brian Goorjian. The Kings finished on top of the ladder with a 22–8 record, and swept the Perth Wildcats 2–0 in the grand final series to claim their first-ever championship.

With Goorjian able to implement his defensive tactics which were so successful with the Spectres, Magic and Titans in Melbourne, there seemed to be no stopping the Kings, who were able to recruit quality imports like 2002–03 league MVP Chris Williams. In addition, many Victorian groomed players who had previously played for Goorijan such as Jason Smith and Bradley Sheridan followed him north to Sydney.

Heal retired after the 2002–03 season, and C. J. Bruton was recruited to take his place, Jason Smith was signed after returning to the NBL after playing in Europe but unfortunately was injured 13 games into the season and was replaced by import Chris Carrawell. The Kings started the 2003–04 season with 10 successive wins, and would eventually win their second championship after their best-of-five grand final series with crosstown rivals West Sydney Razorbacks went down to the deciding fifth game. Kings player Matt Nielsen would win the regular season and finals MVP in 2003–04 before leaving to play overseas.

The Kings again performed strongly in the 2004–05 season despite a disastrous early game against Townsville which saw C. J. Bruton out for weeks with an elbow injury, and a season-ending ACL tear for rookie of the year candidate Luke Kendall. The Kings managed without their starting backcourt until Bruton came back and they signed import big man Rolan Roberts. Arguably stronger than before the Kings finished on top of the ladder and crushed the Wollongong Hawks in three straight games to become the first team in Australian league history to win three consecutive championships. Jason Smith was named the NBL Finals Most Valuable Player.

In the 2005–06 season, the Kings again finished atop the ladder and made it to the grand final. Import centre Rolan Roberts suffered a torn pectoral muscle imitating a Vince Carter dunk during the All Star dunk competition and was replaced by Sedric Webber. In the finals they were swept 3–0 by the Chris Anstey led Melbourne Tigers. The club was then purchased in 2006 for $2 million by the chairman of fuel technology company Firepower International, Tim Johnston. Johnston later sold a part share in 2007 to 31-year-old Dorry Kordahi, CEO and owner of DKM.

The 2006–07 season would see the Kings continue their success into the post-season despite losing star guard C. J. Bruton in the previous off-season to the Brisbane Bullets. The Kings faced off against the Bruton led Bullets in the semi-finals losing 2–0 while captain and key player Jason Smith attempted to play through a broken hand.

A finals rematch was on the table for the Kings in the 2007–08 season facing off against the Melbourne Tigers once again. The series this time would go to the deciding 5th game, which among rumours of a potential collapse for the club and uncertainty around playing contracts and future, saw the Kings lose 3–2 to the Tigers at home.

=== 2008–2010: Club demise ===
On 24 March 2008, coach Brian Goorjian quit the club after a mutual agreement, and on 12 June 2008, the NBL terminated the Sydney team's licence as Firepower collapsed and the Kings were unable to pay player salaries.

=== 2010–2012: Kings relaunch ===
Under a revised management structure and ownership, the Sydney Kings relaunched for the 2010–11 NBL season, returning to the league after a two-year absence. However, despite big-named additions such as Julian Khazzouh, Ben Madgen and Luke Martin, the Kings in their first season back finished in last place on the ladder with an 8–20 record.

Due to the 2011 NBA Lockout, Australia's highest profile basketballer, former Milwaukee Bucks centre Andrew Bogut, was looking to play in the NBL during the 2011–12 season. He was linked with the Adelaide 36ers, the Gold Coast Blaze and the Kings, whom Bogut had supported when growing up in Australia. Sydney was favored to secure his services and Bogut ultimately chose to make his NBL debut with the Kings. However, the insurance to cover his remaining US$39 million contract with the Bucks could not be resolved, leaving the Kings and the NBL without the services of Australia's highest profile player. It was expected that Bogut's signing would see an increase in Kings membership and league attendances. Despite not being able to play, Bogut later expressed interest in joining the Kings' coaching staff during the lockout to help the club. This ultimately did not happen either.

The Kings fared better in 2011–12, finishing the season in seventh spot with an 11–17 record.

=== 2012–2018: Continued struggles ===
The Kings continued to struggle over the ensuing six years, qualifying just once (2012–13) for the playoffs in their eight seasons since returning to the league, and finishing with a losing record in the regular season in each of their eight seasons. In November 2015, the club played their 800th game in franchise history. Australian basketball icon Andrew Gaze was named head coach of the team on a three-year deal starting with the 2016–17 season. The team recruited big names Kevin Lisch, Brad Newley and Aleks Marić plus imports Greg Whittington and Michael Bryson for the 2016–17 season; however after starting the season with five wins in their opening six games, the Kings won just eight of their remaining 22 games and missed the playoffs.

Before the 2017–18 season, the team recruited imports Amritpal Singh, Perry Ellis and Travis Leslie plus small forward Todd Blanchfield; however fared no better, losing 16 of their first 21 games as Lisch suffered a calf injury that would force him to miss most of the regular season. Late in the campaign the club brought in 2016–17 NBL MVP Jerome Randle and big man Jeremy Tyler. Randle led the team to six wins in their final seven games and was named to the All-NBL Second Team, but the Kings missed the playoffs for the fifth consecutive season.

=== 2018–2021: Return to the finals ===
The 2018–19 season was the Kings' 30th anniversary season in the NBL. On 24 April 2018, the Kings announced the signing of Australian basketball icon, Andrew Bogut. In that same offseason, the Kings became the first beneficiary of the NBL's new Next Stars program, which offers a professional option immediately out of secondary school to Americans (who are currently barred from the NBA draft until one year after graduation), as well as Australians and New Zealanders considering U.S. college basketball. Under the program, the team signed American Brian Bowen. After a 18–10 record across the 2018–19 season, the club recorded their first finals appearance since 2013 however lost 2–0 to Melbourne United in the semi-finals. Andrew Bogut would receive MVP honours becoming the 3rd King to receive the award and the first in 15 years.

After Andrew Gaze left the club under a mutual agreement, Will Weaver was signed as the new head coach. In Weaver's first season with the club, the Kings were minor champions for the first time in over a decade and made it through to the grand final series, however after three games the Kings indicated they did not wish to proceed due to the COVID-19 pandemic and forfeited the series to the Perth Wildcats.

=== 2021–present: Second championship era ===
In the 2021–22 season, the Kings won 13 straight games, equalling the second-longest winning streak in franchise history set between the end of the 2002–03 season and the beginning of 2003–04. Jaylen Adams received league MVP honours, becoming the fourth King to receive the award. Sydney went on to defeat the Tasmania Jack Jumpers in the NBL Grand Final series to win franchise's fourth NBL championship. Xavier Cooks was named Grand Final MVP.

The 2022–23 season saw the Kings retain a large portion of their local talent but enlist a new import trio from the likes of Derrick Walton, Justin Simon and Tim Soares. The Kings would continue their dominant performance from the previous season leading to a 19–9 record and the minor premiership, with captain Xavier Cooks taking the honours of league MVP. They returned to the NBL Championship Series where they faced the New Zealand Breakers, winning their fifth championship with a 3–2 series victory. Derrick Walton was named the Championship Series MVP.

In the 2025–26 season, behind coach Brian Goorjian and guard Kendric Davis, the Kings returned to the NBL Championship Series. In game one, the Kings defeated the Adelaide 36ers 112–68. The Kings won the championship in game five with a 113–101 overtime victory, with Davis earning Championship Series MVP.

== Home arena ==
The Sydney Kings' first home venue was the State Sports Centre located at Homebush Bay. After playing at the 5,006-seat venue in 1988 and 1989, the Kings then moved into Sydney's largest indoor venue, the 12,500-seat Sydney Entertainment Centre in 1990. The SEC, known for Kings games as "The Kingdome", would be the Kings' home until the team moved back to Homebush Bay in 1999 and into the new, 18,200-capacity Sydney SuperDome which had been built as the main basketball and gymnastics venue for the 2000 Summer Olympics held in Sydney.

Despite attracting an NBL-record 17,143 crowd for their opening-round game in the 1999–2000 season against the Canberra Cannons (played as a double header with the West Sydney Razorbacks playing the Brisbane Bullets), the Kings' time at the SuperDome only lasted three years. After the club went into voluntary administration following the 2001–02 season and was then purchased by a new investment group, the franchise decided to move back to the Entertainment Centre in 2002, citing falling attendances and the high cost of playing their games at the NBA-size venue. It was also speculated at the time that the core of the Kings fan base came from the eastern and northern suburbs of Sydney and that fans were not enthused about having to travel to Homebush Bay for games.

The Kings moved back to the Entertainment Centre in 2002, where they remained until 2015, though they were forced to move one game in the 2012–13 NBL season to the State Sports Centre due to a pre-booked event taking priority at the Entertainment Centre. At its closing in 2015, the SEC had a basketball capacity of 10,517 (with curtains blocking off seats behind the basket to reduce capacity) giving the Kings the second-largest capacity venue in the NBL behind the 14,846-seat Perth Arena, though as the SEC was opened in 1983 it also gave the Kings the league's oldest venue.

The Kings moved back to Homebush Bay midway through the 2015–16 season due to the SEC being demolished to make way for an apartment complex and convention centre. On 13 March 2016, the Kings came under new management and were subsequently moved back to the SuperDome (Afterpay Arena) for the 2016–17 season. During the regular season, the Kings curtained off the upper deck of the Afterpay Arena (depending on ticket demand), leaving capacity at approximately 9,000. In the final home game of the 2016–17 season, the Kings drew 11,005 fans to their game against Melbourne United—at the time, the second-largest home crowd in franchise history.

In the 2019–20 season alone, six of the top ten home crowds in franchise history attended games at Afterpay Arena.

The Kings averaged 10,012 fans per home game in the 2019–20 NBL season—the largest per-game average at home in franchise history and became the first Sydney Kings team to ever average more than 10,000 fans per home game. The total home fan attendance for the season was 140,168—the largest in franchise history and nearly 20,000 fans more than the previous record set in 1994.

Attendance records

The Sydney Kings have set attendance records for the league on seven occasions while playing at the SuperDome, the largest capacity arena in the NBL. The record currently stands at 18,589. The record was set on 5 April 2026 when the SuperDome hosted Game 5 of the 2025–26 Championship Series.

In the 1999–2000 season, the Kings hosted a double header at the SuperDome with the West Sydney Razorbacks playing the Brisbane Bullets and the Kings playing the Canberra Cannons. This double header set a league record of 17,143 fans in attendance. The record would stand for two decades.

In a game against the Illawarra Hawks on 17 November 2019, the Kings set the next all-time NBL single-game attendance record with 17,514 at the SuperDome. A major drawcard for the game was future NBA star and social media icon LaMelo Ball playing for the Hawks.

In game 3 of the 2022 NBL Grand Final series against the Tasmania Jack Jumpers at the SuperDome, the team attracted a crowd of 16,149—then the biggest playoff crowd in NBL history and the third-largest crowd overall in NBL history.

In the Championship Series of the 2022–23 season against the New Zealand Breakers the Sydney Kings set the new single-game attendance record and playoff game attendance record twice. With the Kings having home-court advantage, games 1, 3 and 5 were played at the SuperDome. On 10 March 2023, a new record of 18,049 attended game 3 of the series. Just five days later with the series at tied 2 wins each, the Kings prevailed in game 5 to win the championship in front of another record attendance of 18,124.

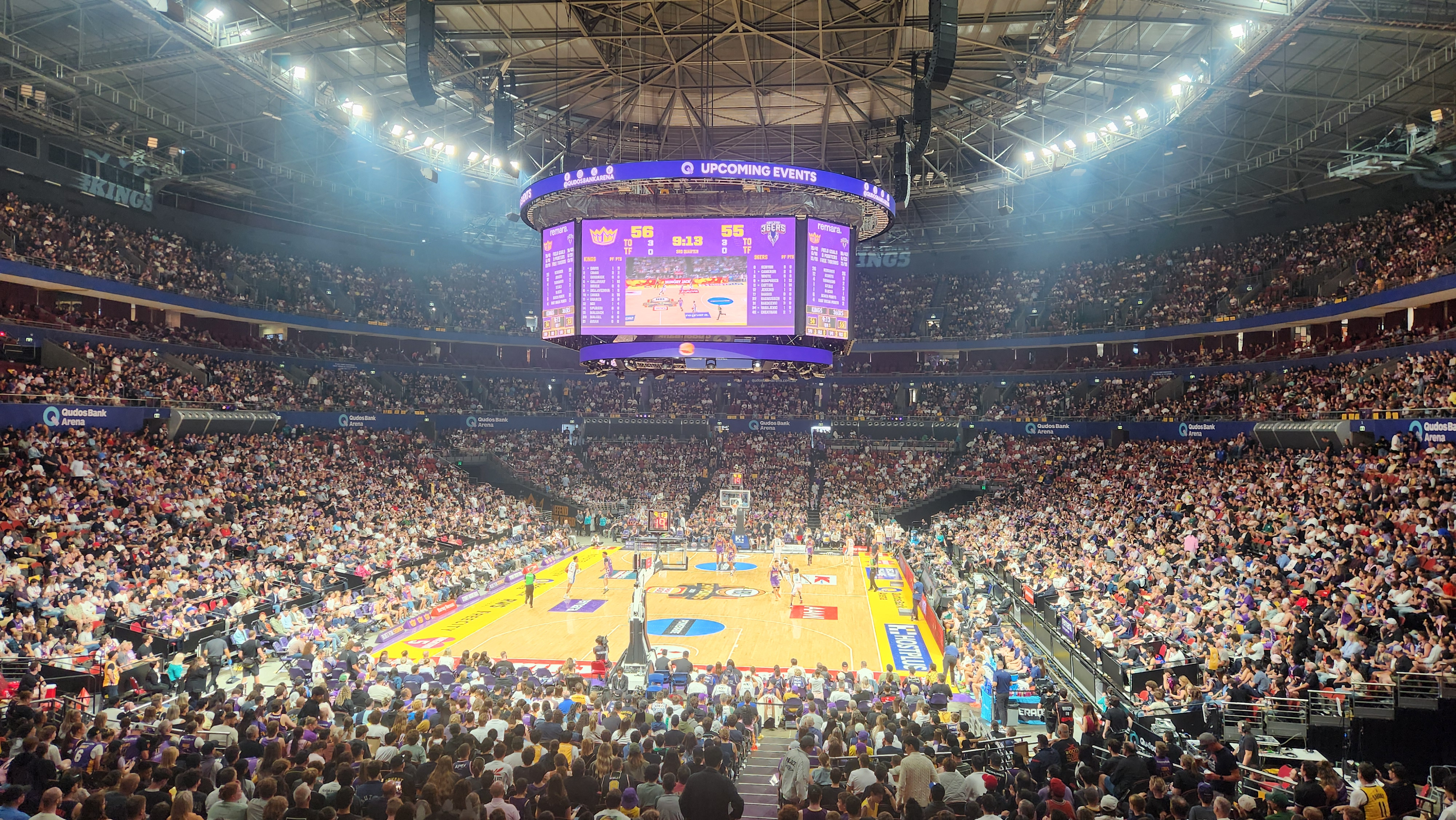
Just after the 3rd quarter begun in the 2026 Championship Series Game 5 at the Sydney SuperDome where the attendance record of 18,589 was set.

The Kings would again beat their own record twice more in 2026 at the SuperDome in similar circumstances. The Kings played the Adelaide 36ers in the 2025–26 Championship Series that went to Game 5. Game 3 of the series saw a new record of 18,373 attend, with the Kings prevailing. A week later, 18,589 attended Game 5 on 5 April 2026 where the Kings would in overtime to take the Championship.

Home arena by year:

- State Sports Centre (1988–1989, 2012, 2016)
- Sydney Entertainment Centre (1990–1999, 2002–2008, 2010–2015)
- Sydney SuperDome (1999–2002, 2016–present)

== Honour roll ==
NBL Championships:	6 (2003, 2004, 2005, 2022, 2023, 2026)
NBL Regular Season Champions:	8 (2003, 2004, 2005, 2006, 2008, 2020, 2023, 2026)
NBL Finals Appearances:	20 (1989, 1990, 1992, 1994, 1996, 2001, 2003, 2004, 2005, 2006, 2007, 2008, 2013, 2019, 2020, 2022, 2023, 2024, 2025, 2026)
NBL Grand Final / Championship Series Appearances:	9 (2003, 2004, 2005, 2006, 2008, 2020, 2022, 2023, 2026)
NBL Most Valuable Player:	Chris Williams (2003), Matthew Nielsen (2004), Andrew Bogut (2019), Jaylen Adams (2022), Xavier Cooks (2023)
NBL Grand Final / Championship Series MVP:	Chris Williams (2003) Matthew Nielsen (2004), Jason Smith (2005), Xavier Cooks (2022), Derrick Walton (2023), Kendric Davis (2026)
NBL Coach of the Year:	Brian Goorjian (2008, 2026)
NBL Rookie of the Year:	Matthew Nielsen (1997), Derek Moore (2000), Travis Lane (2002), Gary Boodnikoff (2003), Mark Worthington (2006), Ben Madgen (2011), Anatoly Bose (2012), Angus Brandt (2015), Isaac Humphries (2018)
NBL Most Improved Player Award:	Ben Madgen (2013)
NBL Best Defensive Player Award:	Isaac Burton (1996), Andrew Bogut (2019)
NBL Best Sixth Man Award:	Dontaye Draper (2008), Kouat Noi (2025)
All-NBL First Team:	Dwayne McClain (1992), Leon Trimmingham (1994), Shane Heal (2003), Chris Williams (2003), Matthew Nielsen (2004), Jason Smith (2005), C. J. Bruton (2006), Mark Worthington (2008), Julian Khazzouh (2011, 2012), Ben Madgen (2013), Andrew Ogilvy (2014), Josh Childress (2015), Andrew Bogut (2019) Jae'Sean Tate (2020), Jaylen Adams (2022), Derrick Walton (2023), Xavier Cooks (2023), Kendric Davis (2026)
All-NBL Second Team:	Shane Heal (2001), Matthew Nielsen (2001, 2003), Ebi Ere (2004), Jason Smith (2006), Sam Young (2014), Kevin Lisch (2017), Brad Newley (2017), Jerome Randle (2018, 2019), Casper Ware (2020, 2021), Andrew Bogut (2020), Xavier Cooks (2022, 2025, 2026)
All-NBL Third Team:	Shane Heal (2002), Kavossy Franklin (2003), C. J. Bruton (2004), Dontaye Draper (2008), Ian Crosswhite (2013)

== Season by season ==
NBL champions	League champions	Runners-up	Finals berth

Season	Tier	League	Regular season					Post-season	Head coach	Captain	Club MVP
Season	Tier	League	Finish	Played	Wins	Losses	Win %	Post-season	Head coach	Captain	Club MVP
Sydney Kings
1988	1	NBL	10th	24	10	14	.417	Did not qualify	Claude Williams	Steve Carfino	Steve Carfino
1989	1	NBL	5th	24	15	9	.625	Won elimination finals (Melbourne) 2–1; Lost semifinals (Canberra) 1–2	Bob Turner	Brad Dalton; Damian Keogh	Marc Ridlen
1990	1	NBL	6th	26	16	10	.615	Lost elimination finals (Brisbane) 1–2	Bob Turner	Brad Dalton; Damian Keogh	Steve Carfino
1991	1	NBL	7th	26	14	12	.538	Did not qualify	Bob Turner	Damian Keogh	Dwayne McClain
1992	1	NBL	2nd	24	17	7	.708	Won quarterfinals (Brisbane) 2–0; Lost semifinals (Melbourne) 1–2	Bob Turner	Damian Keogh	Dwayne McClain
1993	1	NBL	11th	26	11	15	.423	Did not qualify	Bob Turner	Damian Keogh; Dwayne McClain	Dwayne McClain
1994	1	NBL	7th	26	16	10	.615	Lost quarterfinals (North Melbourne) 1–2	Bob Turner	Mark Dalton; Damian Keogh	Leon Trimmingham
1995	1	NBL	10th	26	10	16	.385	Did not qualify	Bob Turner	Damian Keogh	Leon Trimmingham
1996	1	NBL	5th	26	16	10	.615	Lost quarterfinals (Canberra) 1–2	Alan Black	Shane Heal	Isaac Burton
1997	1	NBL	10th	30	12	18	.400	Did not qualify	Alan Black	Bruce Bolden	Melvin Thomas
1998	1	NBL	8th	30	13	17	.433	Did not qualify	Bill Tomlinson	Bruce Bolden	Shane Heal
1998–99	1	NBL	9th	26	9	17	.346	Did not qualify	Bill Tomlinson	Brad Rosen	Matthew Nielsen
1999–2000	1	NBL	9th	28	11	17	.393	Did not qualify	Brett Brown	Matthew Nielsen	Matthew Nielsen
2000–01	1	NBL	5th	28	17	11	.607	Lost qualifying finals (Townsville) 1–2	Brett Brown	Shane Heal	Shane Heal
2001–02	1	NBL	8th	30	14	16	.467	Did not qualify	Brett Brown	Shane Heal	Shane Heal
2002–03	1	NBL	1st	30	22	8	.733	Won qualifying finals (Melbourne) 2–1; Won semifinals (Townsville) 2–1; Won NBL finals (Perth) 2–0	Brian Goorjian	Shane Heal	Chris Williams
2003–04	1	NBL	1st	33	26	7	.788	Won semifinals (Brisbane) 2–0; Won NBL finals (West Sydney) 3–2	Brian Goorjian	Matthew Nielsen	Matthew Nielsen
2004–05	1	NBL	1st	32	21	11	.656	Won semifinals (Brisbane) 2–0; Won NBL finals (Wollongong) 3–0	Brian Goorjian	Jason Smith	Jason Smith
2005–06	1	NBL	1st	32	26	6	.813	Won semifinals (Cairns) 2–0; Lost NBL finals (Melbourne) 0–3	Brian Goorjian	Jason Smith	C.J. Bruton
2006–07	1	NBL	4th	33	20	13	.606	Won quarterfinal (Townsville) 122–89; Lost semifinals (Brisbane) 0–2	Brian Goorjian	Jason Smith	Jason Smith
2007–08	1	NBL	1st	30	27	3	.900	Won semifinals (Perth) 2–1; Lost NBL finals (Melbourne) 2–3	Brian Goorjian	Jason Smith	Mark Worthington
2010–11	1	NBL	9th	28	8	20	.286	Did not qualify	Ian Robilliard	Julian Khazzouh	Julian Khazzouh
2011–12	1	NBL	7th	28	11	17	.393	Did not qualify	Ian Robilliard; Tim Hudson; Shane Heal	Julian Khazzouh	Julian Khazzouh
2012–13	1	NBL	4th	28	12	16	.429	Lost semifinals (New Zealand) 0–2	Shane Heal	Ben Madgen	Ben Madgen
2013–14	1	NBL	6th	28	12	16	.429	Did not qualify	Shane Heal	Ben Madgen	Ben Madgen
2014–15	1	NBL	7th	28	9	19	.321	Did not qualify	Damian Cotter	Ben Madgen	Josh Childress
2015–16	1	NBL	8th	28	6	22	.214	Did not qualify	Damian Cotter; Joe Connelly	Tom Garlepp	Tom Garlepp
2016–17	1	NBL	7th	28	13	15	.464	Did not qualify	Andrew Gaze	Kevin Lisch	Kevin Lisch
2017–18	1	NBL	7th	28	11	17	.393	Did not qualify	Andrew Gaze	Kevin Lisch	Jerome Randle
2018–19	1	NBL	3rd	28	18	10	.643	Lost semifinals (Melbourne) 0–2	Andrew Gaze	Kevin Lisch	Andrew Bogut
2019–20	1	NBL	1st	28	20	8	.714	Won semifinals (Melbourne) 2–1; Lost NBL finals (Perth) 1–2	Will Weaver	Kevin Lisch	Jae'Sean Tate
2020–21	1	NBL	5th	36	19	17	.528	Did not qualify	Adam Forde	Daniel Kickert; Casper Ware	Casper Ware
2021–22	1	NBL	3rd	28	19	9	.679	Won semifinals (Illawarra) 2–0; Won NBL finals (Tasmania) 3–0	Chase Buford	Shaun Bruce; Xavier Cooks	Jaylen Adams
2022–23	1	NBL	1st	28	19	9	.679	Won semifinals (Cairns) 2–1; Won NBL finals (New Zealand) 3–2	Chase Buford	Xavier Cooks	Xavier Cooks
2023–24	1	NBL	5th	28	13	15	.464	Lost play-in qualifier (New Zealand) 76–83	Mahmoud Abdelfattah	Shaun Bruce	Jaylen Adams
2024–25	1	NBL	5th	29	16	13	.552	Lost play-in qualifier (Adelaide) 88–95	Brian Goorjian	Shaun Bruce; Xavier Cooks	Kouat Noi
2025–26	1	NBL	1st	33	24	9	.727	Won semifinals (Perth) 2–0; Won NBL finals (Adelaide) 3–2	Brian Goorjian	Xavier Cooks	Kendric Davis
Regular season record				1052	573	479	.545	8 regular season champions			
Finals record				91	51	40	.695	6 NBL championships			

As of the end of the 2025–26 season

Source: Sydney Kings Year by Year

== Current roster ==
Note: Flags indicate national team eligibility at FIBA-sanctioned events. Players may hold other non-FIBA nationalities not displayed.

Sydney Kings roster
Players
Coaches

Pos.	No.	Nat.	Name	Ht.	Wt.
G	1	(United States)	Davis, Kendric (I)	1.80 m (5 ft 11 in)	83 kg (183 lb)
F	2	(United States)	Craig, Torrey (I)	1.98 m (6 ft 6 in)	95 kg (209 lb)
G/F	3	(Australia)	Robertson, Tyler	1.98 m (6 ft 6 in)	107 kg (236 lb)
G	4	(Australia)	Johnston, Will	1.90 m (6 ft 3 in)	84 kg (185 lb)
G	5	(Australia)	Hanson, Bailey (DP)	1.91 m (6 ft 3 in)
G	7	(Australia)	Stone, Jayden	1.93 m (6 ft 4 in)	84 kg (185 lb)
G	8	(Australia)	Dellavedova, Matthew	1.93 m (6 ft 4 in)	91 kg (201 lb)
C	9	(Australia)	Wessels, Harry	2.16 m (7 ft 1 in)	127 kg (280 lb)
F	10	(Australia)	Cooks, Xavier (C)	2.03 m (6 ft 8 in)	83 kg (183 lb)
F	11	(United States)	Carr, Andrew (IRP)	2.11 m (6 ft 11 in)	107 kg (236 lb)
F	13	(Australia)	Machar, Peitok (DP)	2.08 m (6 ft 10 in)	98 kg (216 lb)
F/C	14	(Australia)	Spurgin, Jason	2.11 m (6 ft 11 in)	113 kg (249 lb)
F	15	(South Sudan)	Maluach, Makuach	1.96 m (6 ft 5 in)	89 kg (196 lb)
F	22	(Australia)	Bofinger, Lachlan (NRP)	2.01 m (6 ft 7 in)	100 kg (220 lb)
F	34	(Australia)	Leaupepe, Keli (injured)	1.98 m (6 ft 6 in)	108 kg (238 lb)

Head coach

- (Australia) Brian Goorjian

Assistant coach(es)

- (Australia) Andrew Bogut
- (Australia) Shaun Roger
- (Australia) Bill Tomlinson

Legend

- (C) Team captain
- (DP) Development player
- (IN) Inactive
- (I) Import player
- (SRP) Special restricted player
- (IRP) Injury replacement player
- (NRP) Nominated replacement player
- (NS) Next Star player
- Injured

- Roster
Updated: 11 September 2026

Notes:

1. SRP (Special Restricted Player): A specific category for import (foreign) players, often relating to special eligibility, such as Asian players under specific NBL rules.
2. IRP (Injury Replacement Player): A player signed temporarily to replace a player who is injured and unable to play.
3. NRP (Nominated Replacement Player): A player signed to replace a player who is absent for a long period (e.g., national team duties or season-ending injury).

== Notable players ==
Note: Flags indicate national team eligibility at FIBA-sanctioned events. Players may hold other non-FIBA nationalities not displayed.

Criteria

To appear in this section a player must have either:

- Set a club record or won an individual award while at the club
- Played at least one official international match for their national team at any time
- Played at least one official NBA match at any time.

- (United States) Jaylen Adams
- (Australia) David Barlow
- (United States) Drew Barry
- (United States) Jerome Beasley
- (United States) Tony Bennett
- (United States) Steve Blake
- (Australia) Todd Blanchfield
- (Australia) Andrew Bogut
- (United States) Bruce Bolden
- (Australia) / (Kazakhstan) Anatoly Bose
- (United States) Brian Bowen
- (Australia) Angus Brandt
- (United States) Kevin Brooks
- (United States) / (Australia) C. J. Bruton
- (United States) Evers Burns
- (Australia) Jason Cadee
- (United States) Steve Carfino
- (Australia) Rhys Carter
- (United States) Josh Childress
- (United States) Randolph Childress
- (United States) Ian Clark
- (Australia) Brad Dalton
- (Australia) Mark Dalton
- (Australia) Ian Davies
- (United States) Kendric Davis
- (New Zealand) Mark Dickel
- (United States) Dontaye Draper
- (United States) Acie Earl
- (United States) / (Nigeria) Ebi Ere
- (United States) Trey Gilder
- (United States) Al Harrington
- (Australia) James Harvey
- (Australia) Shane Heal
- (Australia) Russell Hinder
- (Australia) Isaac Humphries
- (United States) Stephen Jackson
- (United States) Damion James
- (Australia) Luke Kendall
- (Australia) Damian Keogh
- (Australia) Julian Khazzouh
- (Australia) Daniel Kickert
- (Australia) Michael Kingma
- (United States) Travis Leslie
- (United States) / (Australia) Kevin Lisch
- (Brazil) Didi Louzada
- (Australia) Ben Madgen
- (Australia) / (Serbia) Aleks Marić
- (Australia) Steven Marković
- (United States) Jarell Martin
- (Australia) Luke Martin
- (United States) Dwayne McClain
- (Australia) Brad Newley
- (Australia) Matthew Nielsen
- (United States) / (Portugal) Matt Nover
- (Australia) / (Republic of Ireland) Andrew Ogilvy
- (United States) Cameron Oliver
- (United States) Josh Powell
- (United States) / (New Zealand) Dion Prewster
- (United States) / (Ukraine) Jerome Randle
- (United States) / (Bulgaria) E. J. Rowland
- (Australia) Damien Ryan
- (Australia) Glen Saville
- (Australia) Bradley Sheridan
- (India) Amritpal Singh
- (Australia) Jason Smith
- (Australia) Phil Smyth
- (United States) Jae'Sean Tate
- (Australia) Aaron Trahair
- (Australia) Jeremy Tyler
- (United States) Casper Ware
- (United States) David Wear
- (Australia) Jarrad Weeks
- (Australia) Brett Wheeler
- (United States) Chris Williams
- (Australia) Tom Wilson
- (Australia) Mark Worthington
- (United States) / (Lebanon) Sam Young
- (United States) Denzel Valentine

=== 25th Anniversary Team ===
On 10 October 2013, the Sydney Kings announced their best team from the first 25 years of the club at their 2013–14 season launch at the Australian Museum. Three-time championship winner with the Kings Brian Goorjian was named head coach of the 25th Anniversary Team, while Jason Smith was bestowed the honour as captain of the team.

==== Depth chart ====
Coaches

- Head coach: (United States) / (Australia) Brian Goorjian

Pos.	Starter	Bench	Bench	Reserve
C	Matthew Nielsen	Leon Trimmingham
PF	Chris Williams	Mark Dalton	Mark Worthington
SF	Dwayne McClain	Damian Keogh
SG	Jason Smith	C. J. Bruton	Ben Madgen
PG	Shane Heal	Steve Carfino

=== Wall of Legends ===
Wall of Legends banners, hung in the rafters of Afterpay Arena as of 13 January 2018

The club honours players, coaches and administrators who have made a significant contribution to the club during its existence in the competition. These are signified with banners that are hung at the stage end of Afterpay Arena.

Currently the Wall of Legends stands at 12, with the most recent inductions being made at halftime of the Kings vs Melbourne United match on 28 January 2018.

- Steve Carfino, player
- Tim Morrissey, player
- Jason Smith, player
- Dean Uthoff, player
- Mike Wrublewski, founder
- Bob Turner, coach
- Damian Keogh, player
- Mark Dalton, player
- Matthew Nielsen, player
- Brian Goorjian, coach
- C. J. Bruton, player
- Lorraine Landon, administrator

In 2023, Shane Heal's retired jersey banner was removed from the Kings' Wall of Legends following his unceremonious exit as head coach of the Sydney Flames.

== Preseason games against NBA teams ==
ESPN2

2 October 2017
19:00

boxscore

(Australia) Sydney Kings	83–108	(United States) Utah Jazz
Scoring by quarter: 16–35, 31–23, 13–19, 23–31
Pts: Ellis 19; Rebs: Blanchfield 9 Asts: Leslie 3		Pts: Hood 18; Rebs: Gobert 10; Asts: Ingles 5

Vivint Smart Home Arena, Salt Lake City, United States
Attendance: 15,692
Referees: Marc Davis, Kevin Scott, Randy Richardson

ESPN2

30 September 2018
15:30

boxscore

(Australia) Sydney Kings	91–110	(United States) Los Angeles Clippers
Scoring by quarter: 17–28, 37–31, 18–23, 19–28
Pts: Randle 25; Rebs: Lisch 9 Asts: Lisch 6		Pts: Harris 20; Rebs: Harris 11; Asts: three players 5

Stan Sheriff Center, Honolulu, United States
Attendance: 6,911
Referees: James Capers, Gary Zielinski, Karl Lane
