= 1997 Melbourne Tigers season =

Australian basketball team season

- Head coach: (Australia) Lindsay Gaze
- Captain: (Australia) Andrew Gaze
- Arena: Melbourne Park

NBL results
- Record: 19–11 (63.3%)
- Ladder: 2nd
- Finals finish: Champions (Defeated Magic 2–1)
- Stats at NBL.com.au

The 1997 NBL season was the 14th season for the Melbourne Tigers in the Australian-based National Basketball League. The club won its first NBL Championship after defeating the Perth Wildcats 2-1 in the Grand Final series in 1993. In 1996, the Tigers lost to cross town rival South East Melbourne Magic in the Grand Final series 1-2. A year later, they won for the second time.

The Melbourne Tigers played their home games at the 14,820 seat Rod Laver Arena.

== Roster ==
1997 Melbourne Tigers roster
Players
Coaches

Pos.	No.	Nat.	Name	Ht.	Wt.
G/F	6	(Australia)	Giddey, Warrick	1.96 m (6 ft 5 in)	98 kg (216 lb)
F	7	(Australia)	Egan, Daniel	1.98 m (6 ft 6 in)	100 kg (220 lb)
CG	8	(Australia)	Gordon, Ray	1.91 m (6 ft 3 in)	80 kg (176 lb)
CG	10	(Australia)	Gaze, Andrew (C)	2.01 m (6 ft 7 in)	95 kg (209 lb)
F	11	(Australia)	Jeffries, Brett	2.00 m (6 ft 7 in)	100 kg (220 lb)
G	13	(Australia)	Chapman, Damian (DP)	1.90 m (6 ft 3 in)	80 kg (176 lb)
G/F	21	(United States)	Copeland, Lanard (I)	1.98 m (6 ft 6 in)	88 kg (194 lb)
G	22	(Australia)	Wickstrom, Erik (DP)	1.90 m (6 ft 3 in)	75 kg (165 lb)
G/F	23	(Australia)	Rainbow, Brett	1.93 m (6 ft 4 in)	100 kg (220 lb)
F/C	31	(Australia)	Smith, Blair	2.04 m (6 ft 8 in)	105 kg (231 lb)
F	40	(United States)	Timmons, Marcus (I)	2.02 m (6 ft 8 in)	100 kg (220 lb)
F	44	(United States)	Lang, Jarvis (I)	2.01 m (6 ft 7 in)	100 kg (220 lb)
C	50	(Australia)	Bradtke, Mark	2.08 m (6 ft 10 in)	120 kg (265 lb)

Head coach

- (Australia) Lindsey Gaze

Assistant coach(es)

- (Australia) Al Westover

Legend

- (C) Team captain
- (I) Import player
- Injured

=== Depth chart ===
Pos.	Starting 5	Bench 1	Bench 2	Reserves
C	Mark Bradtke	Blair Smith
PF	Marcus Timmons	Brett Jeffries		Jarvis Lang
SF	Warrick Giddey	Daniel Egan
SG	Lanard Copeland	Brett Rainbow
PG	Andrew Gaze	Ray Gordon	Erik Wickstorm	Daniel Chapman

== Ladder ==
Pos	1997 NBL season											
Pos	Team	Pld	W	L	PCT	Last 5	Streak	Home	Away	PF	PA	PP
1	S.E. Melbourne Magic	30	22	8	73.33%	4–1	W1	12–3	10–5	2850	2662	107.06%
2	Melbourne Tigers	30	19	11	63.33%	5–0	W13	9–6	10–5	3092	3028	102.11%
3	North Melbourne Giants	30	18	12	60.00%	3–2	L1	9–6	9–6	2943	2881	102.15%
4	Perth Wildcats	30	17	13	56.67%	3–2	W2	10–5	7–8	2933	2825	103.82%
5	Brisbane Bullets^{1}	30	15	15	50.00%	2–3	L3	10–5	5–10	2731	2786	98.03%
6	Canberra Cannons^{1}	30	15	15	50.00%	4–1	W3	11–4	4–11	2789	2773	100.58%
7	Adelaide 36ers^{2}	30	14	16	46.67%	1–4	L4	7–8	7–8	2973	2922	101.75%
8	Townsville Suns^{2}	30	14	16	46.67%	0–5	L6	9–6	5–10	3084	3015	102.29%
9	Newcastle Falcons^{3}	30	12	18	40.00%	2–3	L1	7–8	5–10	2995	3173	94.39%
10	Sydney Kings^{3}	30	12	18	40.00%	1–4	L3	8–7	4–11	2938	2991	98.23%
11	Illawarra Hawks	30	7	23	23.33%	2–3	W2	4–11	3–12	2906	3178	91.44%

Updated to match(es) played on 29 September 1997. Source: NBL.com.au

The NBL tie-breaker system as outlined in the NBL Rules and Regulations states that in the case of an identical win–loss record, the results in games played between the teams will determine order of seeding.

== Player statistics ==
=== Regular season ===
Legend
GP	Games played	GS	Games started	MPG	Minutes per game
FG%	Field-goal percentage	3P%	3-point field-goal percentage	FT%	Free-throw percentage
RPG	Rebounds per game	APG	Assists per game	SPG	Steals per game
BPG	Blocks per game	PPG	Points per game

No.	Player	GP	GS	MPG	PPG	FG%	3FG%	3P	FT%	RPG	APG	SPG	BPG	TOV
6	Warrick Giddey	30	30	31.24	3.38	.60	.00	0.0	.65	4.6	3.5	0.63	0.13	1.8
7	Daniel Egan	24	0	8.90	3.0	.48	.33	0.8	.60	0.0	0.0	0.8	0.3	0.2
8	Ray Gordon	30	0	17.40	4.77	.33	.27	1.0	.75	1.0	1.0	0.6	0.0	0.5
10	Andrew Gaze	30	30	48.00	31.68	.52	.39	4.0	.86	4.6	6.7	1.4	0.4	4.5
11	Brett Jeffries	11	0	7.54	2.45	.30	.00	0.0	.75	1.2	0.4	0.0	0.2	1.0
13	Damien Chapman	2	0	3.71	1.0	.25	.00	0.0	.00	1.0	0.0	0.0	0.0	0.5
21	Lanard Copeland	30	30	42.00	22.8	.44	.38	3.0	.80	4.6	3.1	2.0	0.7	2.4
22	Erik Wickstrom	8	0	3.44	0.30	.17	.000	0.0	.00	0.3	0.3	0.0	0.0	0.0
23	Brett Rainbow	11	0	4.50	0.92	.44	.20	0.1	.25	0.1	0.27	0.0	0.0	0.0
31	Blair Smith	28	10	22.30	6.47	.56	.00	0.0	.54	4.7	2.1	0.2	0.6	0.4
40	Marcus Timmons	17	17	38.84	16.82	.50	.38	0.6	.73	9.3	3.7	1.7	1.5	3.1
44	Jarvis Lang	8	8	42.30	19.1	.50	.000	0.0	.69	9.1	2.0	0.9	0.9	4.6
50	Mark Bradtke	25	25	44.20	20.36	.50	.000	0.0	.69	12.6	2.5	0.9	1.8	2.6

=== Team leaders ===
- Points per game 31.68 – Andrew Gaze
- Rebounds per game: 12.64 – Mark Bradtke
- Assists per game: 6.7 – Andrew Gaze
- Steals per game: 2.0 – Lanard Copeland
- Blocks per game: 2.1 – Mark Bradtke

=== Finals ===
Legend
GP	Games played	GS	Games started	MPG	Minutes per game
FG%	Field-goal percentage	3P%	3-point field-goal percentage	FT%	Free-throw percentage
RPG	Rebounds per game	APG	Assists per game	SPG	Steals per game
BPG	Blocks per game	PPG	Points per game

No.	Player	GP	GS	MPG	PPG	FG%	3FG%	3PG	FT%	RPG	APG	SPG	BPG	TOV
6	Warrick Giddey	5	5	33.96	1.4	.37	0.0	0.0	.75	5.8	0.2	0.4	0.6	2.0
7	Daniel Egan	4	0	4.90	3.0	.48	.33	0.5	.60	0.5	0.5	0.0	0.1	0.0
8	Ray Gordon	5	0	8.84	3.4	.33	.27	1.0	.75	1.0	1.0	0.1	0.6	0.2
10	Andrew Gaze	5	5	47.29	26.20	.52	.39	4.2	.88	4.5	8.2	0.4	0.3	4.0
11	Brett Jeffries	2	0	4.60	2.0	.33	.00	0.0	.66	1.0	0.5	0.0	0.0	1.5
14	Lanard Copeland	5	5	40.00	23.8	.44	.38	2.4	.80	4.2	3.8	2.0	0.6	2.4
23	Brett Rainbow	2	0	3.26	1.5	.37	.20	0.0	0.0	0.5	0.0	0.0	0.0	0.5
31	Blair Smith	5	0	13.41	2.0	.53	.00	0.0	.50	4.0	0.3	0.1	0.5	0.0
40	Marcus Timmons	5	5	41.38	19.6	.50	.40	0.6	.73	10.4	2.8	1.2	1.4	3.4
50	Mark Bradtke	5	5	46.00	20.60	.51	.00	0.0	.74	11.2	2.5	0.7	1.8	2.2

=== Team leaders ===
- Points per game: 26.20 – Andrew Gaze
- Rebounds per game: 11.20 – Mark Bradtke
- Assists per game: 8.2 – Andrew Gaze
- Steals per game: 2.4 – Lanard Copeland
- Blocks per game: 1.8 – Mark Bradtke

== Awards ==
=== NBL award winners ===
- NBL MVP – Andrew Gaze
- All-NBL First team – Andrew Gaze and Mark Bradtke
- Grand Final MVP – Lanard Copeland
- NBL All-Star – Andrew Gaze, Mark Bradtke and Lanard Copeland
- NBL Coach of the Year – Lindsey Gaze
- NBL Most Efficient Player – Andrew Gaze
- NBL scoring champion – Andrew Gaze
- NBL 3 point champion – Andrew Gaze

== Season summary ==
=== Regular season ===
The 1997 Melbourne Tigers were determined to go one better and avenge their Grand Final loss to the South East Melbourne magic in 1996. Melbourne let go longtime import Dave Simmons after eight years and one championship with the power forward. In Simmons' place they signed import forward Jarvis Lang.

The Tigers had a slow start to the season, starting off the season at 4-9. There was talk in the Herald Sun about sacking the team's long-term head coach Lindsey Gaze, but it was the import Jarvis Lang, who was dealing with knee soreness and struggling to learn the Tigers' shuffle offense, that was let go. In turn the Tigers turned the season around by winning 16 straight games 17-1 during the end of the regular season and finals.

The Tigers went from second last at 4-9 on the ladder during the start of the season to finishing in second place at 19-11, with a 13-game winning streak to end the regular season. The Tigers were meant to finish the regular season with a 20-10 record, but because of some paper work that wasn’t finalized, the league stripped the Tigers of a win over in round 3 against the 36ers. As expected, the team was led by Andrew Gaze, who had one of his best shooting seasons of his career, averaging just on 4 3 point field goals made making 143 for the season, whilst averaging his typical over 30 points per game and over 6 assists. Alongside him in the back court, Lanard Copeland averaged his typical over 22 points for the season, whilst big man Mark Bradtke anchored down low averaging 20 points over 12 rebounds. Timmons averaged over 17 points and over 8 rebounds. Andrew Gaze would be named MVP, and he and Mark Bradtke would be named to All-First NBL team, whilst Andrew Gaze and Mark Bradtke were named to the All-Star game.

=== Semi-finals ===
Along with the 1st placed South East Melbourne Magic, the Tigers were given a bye in the quarter-finals. In their three-game semi-final against the 3rd placed North Melbourne Giants there was little resistance, sweeping them in two games. The Tigers would be moving on to their second consecutive grand final appearance. Andrew Gaze was outstanding in the semi-finals, averaging 36.5 points and 9.5 assists per game. Ahead of the Tigers was cross town rival South East Melbourne Magic, the same team that they had lost to the year before in the deciding game 3.

== NBL grand final ==
The Tigers' opponents in the 1997 NBL Grand Final would again be the South East Melbourne Magic, the same team that beat the Tigers in the previous grand final in game 3. All three of the games would be held at Melbourne Park, game 3 if needed. Similar to the Tigers the Magic swept their previous round of the finals.

Game 1 was a beat down from the Tigers, who were on full attack from the beginning, never trailing in the game and winning 111-74. Larand Copeland was the game's high scorer with 29, whilst Gaze added 23 and 9 assists. Frank Drimc was top scorer with 12 for the Magic.

Similarly to the year before after dropping the first game, Game 2 was a lot better for the Magic. They started veteran John Dorge over the young Chris Anstey. The Magic bounced back to beat the Tigers, winning the close game to even the series at 1-1 and forcing a game 3 for the second straight year against the Magic and Tigers. The scores were 84-78 with Chris Anstey bouncing back from an average game one dropping 21 points in game 2. Lanard Copeland was the Tigers' high scorer with 28.

For the second straight year the Melbourne Tigers played the South East Melbourne Magic in game 3 to decide who would win the championship. The Melbourne Tigers won the NBL championship with a score line of 93-83, the top scorer again being Larand Copeland with 26 points; Gaze added 22 and 9 assists. Lanard Copeland was named Most Valuable Player, and Andrew Gaze won his second championship ring.

=== Game 1 ===
TV 0

October 25th
12:00 p.m. EST

Box score

South East Melbourne Magic 74, Melbourne Tigers 111
Scoring by quarter: 20-29, 17-32, 14-17, 23-33
Pts: Frank Drimc 12; Rebs: Frank Drimc 11; Asts: Sam Mackinnon 4	Pts: Larnad Copeland 29; Rebs: Mark Bradtke 9 Asts: Andrew Gaze 9
Melbourne leads series, 1–0

Melbourne Park
Referees: Bill Mildenhall, Ray Hunt, Scott Butler

=== Game 2 ===
TV 0

October 29th
12:00 p.m. EST

Box score

Melbourne Tigers 78, South East Melbourne Magic 84
Scoring by quarter: 25-21, 22-24, 19-20, 12-19
Pts: Lanard Copeland 29; Rebs: Marcus timmons 12; Asts: Andrew Gaze 5	Pts: Chris Anstey 21; Rebs: Mike Kelly 10; Asts: Sam Mackinnon 6
Series tied, 1–1

Melbourne Park
Referees: Bill Mildenhall, Eddie Crouch, Michael Butler

=== Game 3 ===
September 1st
12:00 p.m. EST

Box score

South East Melbourne Magic 83, Melbourne Tigers 93
Scoring by quarter: 21-25, 15-25, 19-20, 28-23
Pts: Tony Ronaldson 26; Rebs: Frank Drimc 9 Asts: Sam Mackinnon 6	Pts: Larnad Copeland 26; Rebs: Marcus Timmons 13; Asts: Andrew Gaze 9
Melbourne wins series and NBL Championship, 2–1; Grand Final MVP: Lanard Copeland (Melbourne)

Melbourne Park
Referees: Bill Mildenhall , Ray Hunt, Scott Butler
