= Kashama =

Kashama is a surname. Notable people with the surname include:

- Alain Kashama (born 1979), American and Canadian football player
- Fernand Kashama (born 1985), Canadian football player
- Hakeem Kashama (born 1978), Canadian football player
- Kalonji Kashama (born 1991), Canadian football player
