= Kalonji Kashama =

Canadian gridiron football player (born 1991)

No. 95
- Position: Defensive lineman

Personal information
- Born: July 5, 1991 (age 35); Brampton, Ontario, Canada
- Listed height: 6 ft 4 in (1.93 m)
- Listed weight: 259 lb (117 kg)

Career information
- High school: Notre Dame (Brampton, Ontario)
- College: Eastern Michigan (2010–2013)
- CFL draft: 2013: 3rd round, 27th overall pick

Career history
- 2014: Detroit Lions*
- 2014–2015: Ottawa Redblacks
- 2016: Saskatchewan Roughriders
- 2017: Edmonton Eskimos
- * Offseason or practice squad member only
- Stats at CFL.ca

Kalonji Kashama (born July 5, 1991) is a Canadian former professional football defensive lineman who played in the Canadian Football League (CFL). He was selected by the Ottawa Redblacks in the third round and 27th overall in the 2013 CFL draft. After completing his college eligibility, he signed with the Detroit Lions on June 2, 2014. Following his release from the Lions on July 28, 2014, Kashama signed with the Redblacks on September 1, 2014. He played college football with the Eastern Michigan Eagles. His brothers Hakeem, Alain, and Fernand, as well as his cousin, Tim Biakabutuka all played professional football.

He was released by the Edmonton Eskimos on May 1, 2018.
