= NBL Most Efficient Player Award =

The National Basketball League Most Efficient Player was an annual National Basketball League (NBL) award given between 1990 and 1997. After 1997, the award was discontinued because Andrew Gaze was the only player winning the award.

== Winners ==
Year	Player	Team
1990	Andrew Gaze	Melbourne Tigers
1991	Andrew Gaze	Melbourne Tigers
1992	Andrew Gaze	Melbourne Tigers
1993	Andrew Gaze	Melbourne Tigers
1994	Andrew Gaze	Melbourne Tigers
1995	Andrew Gaze	Melbourne Tigers
1996	Andrew Gaze	Melbourne Tigers
1997	Andrew Gaze	Melbourne Tigers
