= Stephen Hoare =

Australian basketball player

Personal information
- Born: 30 October 1975 (age 51) Melbourne, Victoria
- Listed height: 201 cm (6 ft 7 in)
- Listed weight: 100 kg (220 lb)

Career information
- Playing career: 1995–2012
- Position: Power forward

Career history
- 1995–1997: North Melbourne Giants
- 1998–2000: West Sydney Razorbacks
- 2000–2009: Melbourne Tigers
- 2009–2010: Townsville Crocodiles
- 2010–2012: Gold Coast Blaze

Career highlights
- NBL Best Sixth Man (2006, 2007); 2x NBL champion (2006, 2008)

Stephen Hoare (born 30 October 1975) is a retired Australian professional basketball player.

== Career highlights ==
- Awarded "Players Player" at the Gold Coast Blaze 2012.
- Awarded "Players Player" at the Gold Coast Blaze 2011.
- Awarded "Players Player" at the Townsville Crocodiles 2010.
- Won the NBL Championship with the Melbourne Tigers 2008.
- Named 2007 NBL Best Sixth Man.
- Won the NBL Championship with the Melbourne Tigers 2006.
- Named 2006 NBL Best Sixth Man.
- Played in 4 straight NBL Grand Finals (2006–2009).
- Selected in the 2004/05 NBL All-Star team.
- Second overall in the 2003 NBL Best Sixth Man award
- Third overall in the 2002 NBL Best Sixth Man award
- Selected to the ABA Conference First Team in 2001 and 2002.
- ABA All-Star in 1997
- Part of Australian Under 23 squad in 1996

== Statistics ==
- Currently ranked 21st All Time in Games Played in the NBL (he played 465 games in the league).
- Currently ranked 6th All Time in Games Played for the Melbourne Tigers (he played 312 games for the club).
- Only twice in his 17-year career did a team with Hoare on it miss the finals.
- He is ranked in the Top 10 All Time Individual Stats for the Melbourne Tigers in the following categories:
  - Games Played (312) ranked #6
  - Points Scored (2,948) ranked #6
  - Field Attempts (2,257) ranked #7
  - Field Goals Made (1,170) ranked #5
  - Field Goal % (52% 1170/2257) ranked #9
  - 3PT Attempts (494) ranked #9
  - 3PT Made (179) ranked #8
  - 3PT % (36% 179/494) ranked #7
  - Free Throw Attempts (633) ranked #6
  - Free Throws Made (429) ranked #6
  - Assists (805) ranked #7
  - Total Rebounds (1,900) ranked #4
  - Offensive Rebounds (663) ranked #4
  - Defensive Rebounds (1,237) ranked #5
