= Tim Biakabutuka =

American football player (born 1974)

No. 21
- Position: Running back

Personal information
- Born: January 24, 1974 (age 52); Kinshasa, Republic of Zaire
- Listed height: 6 ft 0 in (1.83 m)
- Listed weight: 215 lb (98 kg)

Career information
- High school: Jacques-Rousseau (QC); Vanier College
- College: Michigan (1993–1995)
- NFL draft: 1996: 1st round, 8th overall pick
- CFL draft: 1996: 6th round, 46th overall pick

Career history
- Carolina Panthers (1996–2001)

Awards and highlights
- Third-team All-American (1995); Second-team All-Big Ten (1995)

Career NFL statistics
- Rushing yards: 2,530
- Rushing average: 4.1
- Rushing touchdowns: 14
- Receptions: 77
- Receiving yards: 789
- Receiving touchdowns: 3
- Stats at Pro Football Reference

Tshimanga "Tim" Biakabutuka (born January 24, 1974) is a former American football running back. He played college football at the University of Michigan from 1993 to 1995, and was drafted with the eight overall pick in the 1996 NFL draft by the Carolina Panthers of the National Football League (NFL). He holds the Michigan Wolverines single-season rushing record with 1,818 rushing yards in 1995. He is also distinguished as being the first Zairian to play in the NFL.

== Early life ==
Biakabutuka left the former Zaire with his family for Canada when he was four years old, settling in the Montreal area, where his family still lives. He did not play gridiron football until his high school in Longueuil organized a team. After grade 11, he attended CEGEP at Vanier College in Saint-Laurent, Quebec, where his football exploits earned him the nickname "Touchdown Tim" and a scholarship to play college football at the University of Michigan.

== College career ==
Biakabutuka enrolled at the University of Michigan in 1993 and played college football for the Michigan Wolverines football team from 1993 to 1995. As a freshman in 1993, he was a backup to Tyrone Wheatley and Ricky Powers, but he saw significant action against Purdue on November 6, 1993, rushing for 140 yards and scoring two touchdowns on 24 carries.

As a sophomore, Biakabutuka was again a backup to Wheatley, being used as a starter in only one game. Despite his role as a backup, Biakabutuka rushed for 783 yards and had four 100-yard games (141 yards against Michigan State, 128 yards against Boston College, and 100 yards against both Notre Dame and Purdue).

Biakabutuka became the Wolverines' full-time starting running back in 1995. That year, he broke Jamie Morris's single-season rushing record. Biakabutuka totalled 1,818 rushing yards on 303 carries (6.0 yards per carry) during the 1995 season. On November 25, 1995, he rushed for 313 yards on 37 carries in a 31–23 victory over previously unbeaten Ohio State. His performance against Ohio State ranks as the second highest single-game performance in Michigan history, trailing only Ron Johnson's 347-yard game against Wisconsin in 1968.

== Professional career ==
Pre-draft measurables
Height	Weight	Arm length	Hand span
6 ft 0 1/8 in (1.83 m)	205 lb (93 kg)	31 7/8 in (0.81 m)	9 in (0.23 m)

Biakabutuka was selected by the Carolina Panthers in the first round (eighth overall pick) of the 1996 NFL draft. During his career in the NFL, Biakabutuka was often injured. He never played more than 12 games in a single season. For his career, he appeared in 51 games, 35 as a starter, over six seasons from 1996 to 2001. He totalled 2,530 rushing yards and 789 receiving yards and scored 17 touchdowns. As a member of the Panthers, Biakabutuka became the first running back to record two touchdown runs of 60 or more yards in the same game.

== NFL career statistics ==
Legend
**Bold**	Career high

Year	Team	Games		Rushing					Receiving				
Year	Team	GP	GS	Att	Yds	Avg	Lng	TD	Rec	Yds	Avg	Lng	TD
1996	CAR	4	4	71	229	3.2	17	0	0	0	0.0	0	0
1997	CAR	8	2	75	299	4.0	26	2	0	0	0.0	0	0
1998	CAR	10	3	101	427	4.2	41	3	8	138	**17.3**	42	1
1999	CAR	11	11	138	**718**	**5.2**	**67**	**6**	23	189	8.2	32	0
2000	CAR	12	11	**173**	627	3.6	43	2	**34**	**341**	10.0	25	**2**
2001	CAR	5	4	53	230	4.3	27	1	12	121	10.1	**47**	0
		50	35	611	2,530	4.1	67	14	77	789	10.2	47	3

== Personal life ==
Biakabutuka currently resides in Matthews, North Carolina, and owns eight Bojangles restaurants in Augusta, Georgia. He is a cousin to Hakeem, Alain, Kalonji, and Fernand Kashama, who also all played American or Canadian football. Tim's nephew, Jérémie Biakabutuka, played hockey in the QMJHL whose rights were acquired by the Anaheim Ducks in a trade during the 2024–25 season

== See also ==
- Lists of Michigan Wolverines football rushing leaders
- List of Montreal athletes
- List of famous Montrealers
