= Brett Rainbow =

Australian basketball player (born 1975)

Personal information
- Born: 1975 (age 50–51)
- Listed height: 194 cm (6 ft 4 in)

Career information
- Playing career: 1994–2004
- Position: Guard / forward

Career history
- 1994–1999: Melbourne Tigers
- 2003–2004: Guangdong Southern Tigers

Career highlights
- NBL champion (1997); 3× NBL Slam Dunk champion (1993–1995)

Brett Rainbow (born 1975) is an Australian former professional basketball player. He played six seasons for the Melbourne Tigers of the National Basketball League (NBL), winning an NBL championship in 1997.

Rainbow debuted for the Melbourne Tigers in the 1994 NBL season. He played minimal time in his 35 games over six seasons with Melbourne, recording a total of 41 points and 15 rebounds. His final NBL season came in 1998–99. During this time, he won the league's slam dunk competition three years on end in 1993, 1994 and 1995.

In the 2003–04 season, Rainbow had a stint with the Guangdong Southern Tigers in the Chinese Basketball Association.
