= Dave Thomas (basketball) =

Canadian basketball player

Personal information
- Born: December 4, 1976 (age 49) Brampton, Ontario, Canada
- Listed height: 6 ft 8 1/4 in (2.04 m)
- Listed weight: 205 lb (93 kg)

Career information
- High school: Notre Dame (Brampton, Ontario)
- College: Michigan State (1996–2001)
- NBA draft: 2001: undrafted
- Playing career: 2001–2009
- Position: Small forward / shooting guard

Career history
- 2001–2002: Canberra Cannons
- 2003–2008: Melbourne Tigers
- 2008: Cairns Taipans
- 2008–2009: Melbourne Tigers

Career highlights
- 2× NBL champion (2006, 2008); All-NBL First Team (2007); All-NBL Second Team (2006); NCAA champion (2000)

David Thomas (born December 4, 1976) is a Canadian former professional basketball player who played eight seasons in the Australian National Basketball League (NBL). He played college basketball for Michigan State University and has represented Canada in international competition.

== High school and college career ==
Born in Brampton, Ontario, Thomas attended Notre Dame Catholic Secondary School where he averaged 18 points, 10 rebounds and eight assists per game as a senior in 1995–96. He went on to play for Michigan State where he was a reserve on the Spartans' 2000 championship team. In four seasons, he averaged 3.2 points, 3.6 rebounds and 1.2 assists in 114 career games, including 46 starts.

== Professional career ==
After going undrafted in the 2001 NBA draft, Thomas signed with the Canberra Cannons for the 2001–02 NBL season. In May 2002, he re-signed with the Cannons on a two-year deal. However, he left in December 2002 after the Cannons were forced into voluntary administration three months into the 2002–03 NBL season.

On October 8, 2003, he signed a one-year deal with the Melbourne Tigers. On January 27, 2004, he signed a two-year contract extension with the Tigers. In March 2006, he re-signed with the Tigers, and a year later, he was named to the 2007 All-NBL first team.

In July 2008, he signed with the Cairns Taipans. On December 11, 2008, he was released by the Taipans because the club could no longer afford him, fellow import Larry Abney or head coach Alan Black. The Taipans did continue playing, however, only after the entire team agreed to a blanket 45 per cent pay cut for the rest of the season.

On December 29, 2008, he re-signed with the Melbourne Tigers for the rest of the 2008–09 NBL season.

On July 9, 2009, he signed a one-year deal with the New Zealand Breakers. However, on August 3, 2009, he was forced to pull out of his one-year deal due to a recurrence of knee and back problems, which effectively ended his career.

== Post-playing career ==
Since his retirement in 2009, Thomas has spent time as the host of the Spartan Fastbreak show on WLNS TV, was the owner and operator of Ever Green Car Wash & Detail in Lansing, and worked for Michigan State University Federal Credit Union as the Business Services Assistant Manager.

On July 7, 2014, Thomas was hired by Michigan State women's basketball head coach, Suzy Merchant, as the program's Director of Basketball Operations and Technology. The following year, he moved over to the men's program and attained the same role under coach Tom Izzo.

== Personal ==
Thomas is the son of Roy and Linda Thomas.
