= Jamaal Westerman =

American football player (born 1985)

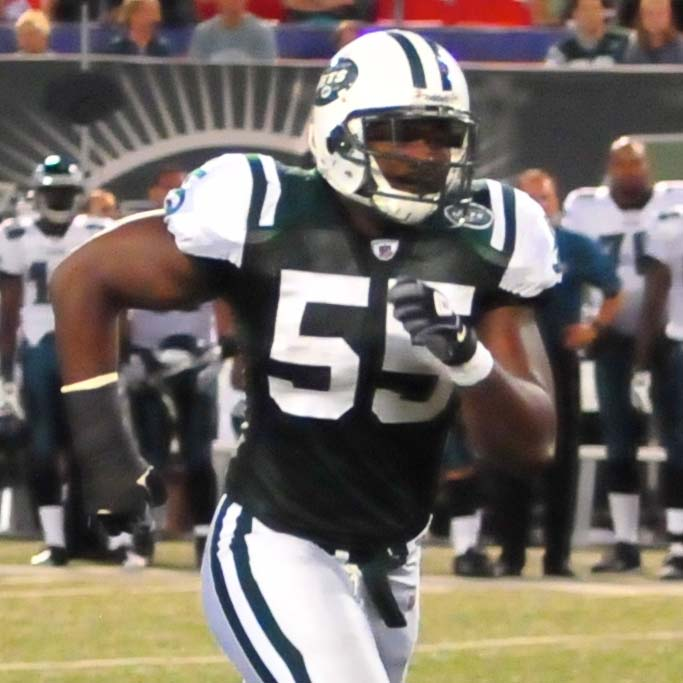
- Westerman with the New York Jets in 2009

Rutgers Scarlet Knights
- Title: Defensive graduate assistant
- CFL status: National

Personal information
- Born: February 21, 1985 (age 41); Brooklyn, New York, U.S.
- Listed height: 6 ft 3 in (1.91 m)
- Listed weight: 260 lb (118 kg)

Career information
- High school: Brampton (ON) Notre Dame
- College: Rutgers
- NFL draft: 2009: undrafted

Career history

Playing
- New York Jets (2009–2011); Miami Dolphins (2012)*; Arizona Cardinals (2012); Indianapolis Colts (2012); Buffalo Bills (2013); Pittsburgh Steelers (2013); Cleveland Browns (2014)*; Winnipeg Blue Bombers (2015–2017); Montreal Alouettes (2018); Hamilton Tiger-Cats (2018–2019)
- * Offseason or practice squad member only

Coaching
- Rutgers (2020–present) Defensive graduate assistant

Awards and highlights
- 2× Second-team All-Big East (2006, 2008); CFL West All-Star (2015); Dr. Beattie Martin Trophy (2015)

Career NFL statistics
- Total tackles: 62
- Sacks: 6
- Forced fumbles: 2
- Fumble recoveries: 4
- Stats at Pro Football Reference
- Stats at CFL.ca

Jamaal Akeem Westerman (born February 21, 1985) is an American former professional football player who was a defensive lineman who is currently a college football coach for Rutgers. He was signed by the New York Jets as an undrafted free agent in 2009. He played college football for the Rutgers Scarlet Knights and was named to the second–team All–Big East team two times. Westerman played high school football in Fort Lauderdale, Florida, at St. Thomas Aquinas High School before moving to Brampton, Ontario and attending Notre Dame Secondary School.

In the National Football League (NFL), Westerman was a member of the Miami Dolphins, Arizona Cardinals, Indianapolis Colts, Buffalo Bills, Pittsburgh Steelers and Cleveland Browns. In the Canadian Football League (CFL), he was a member of the Winnipeg Blue Bombers, Montreal Alouettes, and Hamilton Tiger-Cats.

== Early life ==
Westerman was born in Brooklyn, New York, on February 21, 1985. He and his family moved to Fort Lauderdale, Florida, where Westerman began his high school career at St. Thomas Aquinas High School. Following his freshman season, he moved, this time to Brampton, Ontario, and enrolled at Notre Dame Secondary School. Westerman started every year he was there and led both the team and league in tackles and sacks. After graduating from Notre Dame in 2004 he was considered a two-star prospect by Rivals.com. Rutgers, Boise State and Central Michigan all recruited him and all offered him scholarships. He eventually accepted Rutgers' scholarship offer.

== College career ==
Westerman received three scholarship offers from National Collegiate Athletic Association (NCAA) colleges before accepting one from Rutgers.

After redshirting in 2004, Westerman made a quick impression on the Rutgers coaching staff after recording six tackles in two games to begin 2005. In the Cincinnati game, Westerman recorded a sack on quarterback Dustin Grutza which forced a fumble.

Before the 2006 season, Westerman was involved in a car accident with teammates Willie Foster and Corey Hyman. Westerman and Foster were uninjured while Hyman required two stitches in his forehead. On September 29, against South Florida, Westerman sacked quarterback Matt Grothe for a five-yard loss. After the month of September, Westerman had eight tackles and two and a half sacks. Through eight games, Westerman was the team leader in sacks with six. Against Connecticut, Westerman blocked a punt and recovered a fumble by Connecticut quarterback D. J. Hernandez. Both the punt and fumble recovery were returned for a touchdown. Westerman also recorded two and a half sacks in the game. By the final game in the season, Westerman and defensive end William Beckford had a combined 59 tackles, 16 tackles for a loss with 10 sacks. In the Texas Bowl against the Kansas State Wildcats, Westerman sacked quarterback Josh Freeman twice and recovered a Freeman fumble. Westerman was named second–team All–Big East following the season along with teammates Brian Leonard, Cameron Stephenson, Pedro Sosa, Jeremy Ito, Ramel Meekins, Devraun Thompson, Ron Girault and Courtney Greene.

During spring practice, Westerman and two other starter defensive linemen missed the annual intersquad scrimmage due to injuries. In Rutgers' 59–0 win over Norfolk State, Westerman recorded one sack on quarterback Casey Hansen. Against Syracuse and South Florida, Westerman recorded two sacks which gave him six for the season. Following the season, Westerman and Rutgers earned a bid to play in the International Bowl against Ball State. The game was played in his hometown of Toronto. According to Westerman he received numerous questions from teammates about Toronto, including "What's the weather like?"

Beginning in March 2008, Rutgers attempted to convert Westerman to defensive tackle, so he could replace the departed Eric Foster. However, Westerman ended up playing defensive end during the season. Against Morgan State, Westerman blocked a punt and recovered the loose ball. Westerman suffered a torn biceps against Louisville and was forced to sit out the rest of the season which included a bowl game. Despite his injury, he led Rutgers with six sacks on the season.

Westerman ended his collegiate career with 26 sacks, 141 tackles and 45 tackles for a loss. His career sack total ranked him third highest in Rutgers school history.

== Professional playing career ==
=== New York Jets ===
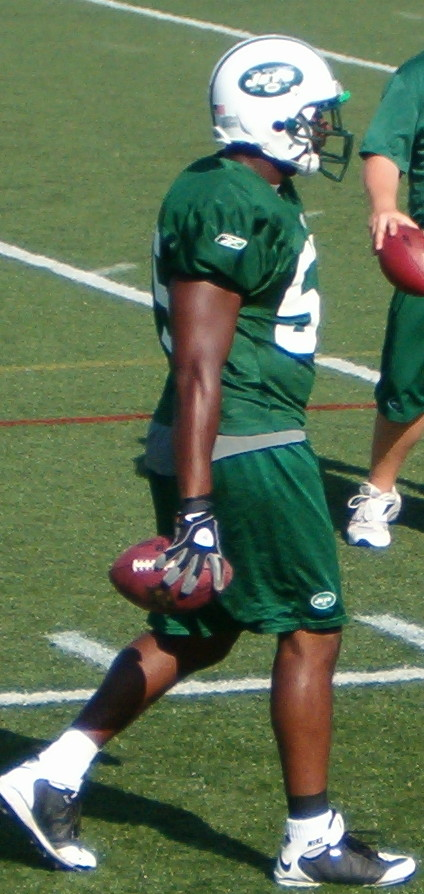
Westerman with the Jets in 2009

Westerman was signed by the New York Jets as an undrafted free agent on April 27, 2009. On June 9, 2009, Jets head coach Rex Ryan said that he expected Westerman to make the team's final roster. He ended up making the final roster as an outside linebacker and recorded two tackles and a sack in his debut against the Houston Texans on September 13. On October 9, 2011, Westerman recorded 5 tackles along with 2 sacks against the New England Patriots but in a losing effort while the Jets lost 30–21.

=== Miami Dolphins ===
Westerman signed with the Miami Dolphins on March 15, 2012. He was waived during the final cuts before ever playing a regular season game for the Miami Dolphins.

=== Arizona Cardinals ===
On September 1, Westerman was claimed off waivers by the Arizona Cardinals. After making just one tackle in five games for the team, he was waived on November 20.

=== Indianapolis Colts ===
On December 4, Westerman signed with the Indianapolis Colts.

=== Buffalo Bills ===
On August 14, 2013, Westerman was signed by the Buffalo Bills. After appearing in 12 games with the Bills in 2013, Westerman was waived on December 10, 2013.

=== Pittsburgh Steelers ===
Westerman signed with the Pittsburgh Steelers on December 17, 2013, after a season-ending injury to linebacker LaMarr Woodley. He appeared in one game for the Steelers during the 2013 NFL season.

=== Cleveland Browns ===
On July 24, 2014, Westerman signed with the Cleveland Browns. He was released by the Browns on August 30, 2014, as they trimmed their roster down to 53 players.

=== Winnipeg Blue Bombers ===
On May 7, 2015, Westerman signed with the Winnipeg Blue Bombers of the Canadian Football League (CFL). He appeared in 17 games in 2015, registering 17 sacks and receiving the Western nomination for Most Outstanding Canadian. Unfortunately for Westerman, Ottawa Redblacks receiver Brad Sinopoli would end up winning the award for Most Outstanding Canadian. He followed up his outstanding 2015 season with two more strong seasons in Winnipeg, compiling 65 more tackles, 15 quarterback sacks and three forced fumbles.

=== Montreal Alouettes ===
On February 14, 2018, the first day of free agency, Westerman signed with the Montreal Alouettes; joining his brother Jabar Westerman. Westerman played five games for the Alouettes, contributing with 19 defensive tackles and three sacks.

=== Hamilton Tiger Cats ===
On July 22, 2018, Westerman was traded to the Hamilton Tiger-Cats along with international wide receiver Chris Williams and two first-round draft selections (2020, 2021) as part of a blockbuster trade for quarterback Johnny Manziel. Westerman played in eight regular season games for the Ti-Cats, registering 10 tackles before being placed on the 6-game injured list on September 28, 2018, with an Achilles tendon rupture. Mid-way through the 2019 season Westerman was getting close to returning to action while recovering from his Achilles injury, but suffered a torn triceps in practice, which prompted the team to place him on the injured reserve list revealing he would miss the remainder of the season.

== Coaching career ==
In 2020 Westerman was named a defensive graduate assistant for Rutgers, under his former head coach Greg Schiano. For the past two seasons, Westerman has been an Assistant Strength and Conditioning coach.

== Personal life ==
Westerman's brother, Jawann, walked onto the Rutgers football team as a wide receiver after Westerman encouraged him to do so. His other brother, Jabar Westerman, was a first round draft pick of the BC Lions in the 2012 Canadian Football League college draft.
