= Notre Dame Catholic Secondary School (Brampton) =

Notre Dame Secondary School
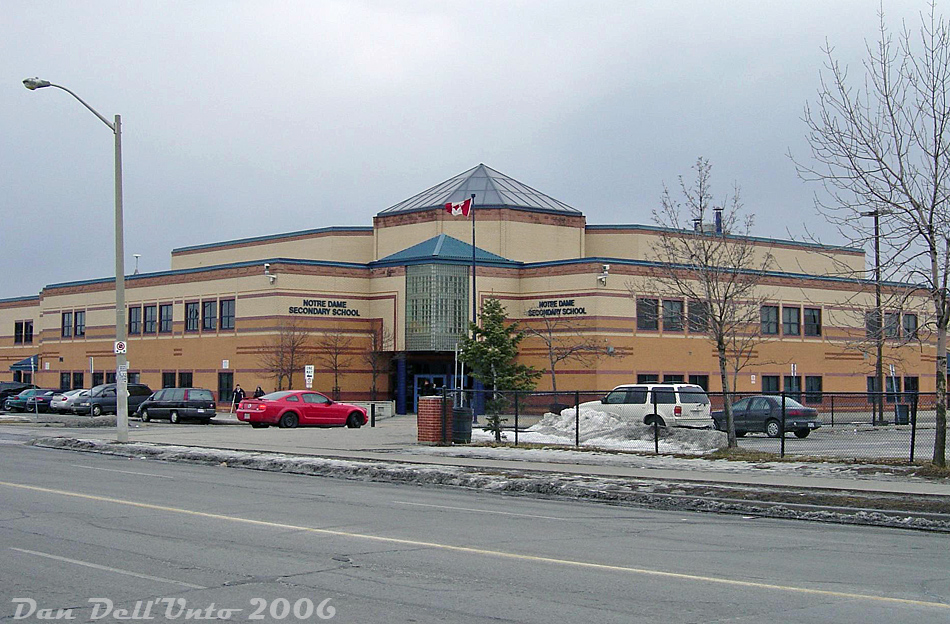
- Notre Dame Catholic Secondary School in Brampton, Ontario

Location
- 2 Notre Dame Avenue; Brampton, Ontario, L6Z 4L5; Canada; 43.71964°N 79.77959°W

Information
- School type: Secondary
- Motto: Justice, Love and Peace
- Established: 1983
- School board: Dufferin-Peel Catholic District School Board
- Superintendent: Wayne Brunton
- Area trustee: Anna da Silva (Ward 1), Darryl D'Souza (Ward 2)
- Principal: Yonas Lijiam
- Grades: 9-12
- Language: English
- Colours: Silver, maroon and Black
- Team name: Notre Dame Knights
- Website: www.dpcdsb.org/ndame

Notre Dame Catholic Secondary School (sometimes referred to as Dame or abbreviated to ND) is located in Brampton, Ontario, Canada and operates under the Dufferin-Peel Catholic District School Board (DPCDSB).

== Elementary Feeder Schools ==
- Sacred Heart
- St. Agnes
- St. Cecilia
- St. Leonard
- St. Joachim
- St. Stephen

== History ==
The school was established in 1983, opening with eight teachers, and a single 9th grade class, each year expanding to grade 13. While the majority of the students were living in Brampton, many were bussed in daily from various areas, including Orangeville, Bolton, and Georgetown. The building Notre Dame originally occupied, was on the west side of McLaughlin Road North, just south of Flowertown Avenue, and was a former grade school, known as Beatty Flemming. Mr. Lorne Howcroft was the school's first principal.

In 1986, Notre Dame was relocated to a temporary facility / building constructed behind Sheridan College. It moved to its current and present home in 1988, a newly built school building on Notre Dame Avenue near the corner of Bovaird Drive and Kennedy Road in the Heart Lake neighbourhood of Brampton.

== Religion ==
As a Catholic school, Notre Dame requires students to take several religion classes throughout their high school career. It also has its own chapel, where students are welcome to pray or visit during their lunch periods and after school.

== Athletics ==
The school participates in several athletic competitions as the Knights. In 1985, ND Knights co-ed cheerleading team, in a Hawaiian Theme, won the All Ontarios at the University of Western Ontario where the competition was held. Notre Dame Football began with a rag tag bunch of flag players (intramural) and held the annual toilet bowl for the victors each year. In 2004, the ND Knight's football team was promoted to the Peel Region's Tier 1 football league and have since won four ROPSSAA championships (2003, 2006, 2007, 2011). Notre Dame has over two dozen other sports teams including volleyball, basketball, rugby, soccer, and fast pitch. In 2012, as well as a ROPSSAA title in senior boys' football, the senior girls' volleyball won a title, and the senior girls' basketball team won a silver medal. The senior boys' basketball team became a top team in the ROPSSAA "OFSAA" division during the first half of the 2020s, winning the division in 2023, advancing to the 2023 AAA OFSAA Boys Basketball Championships in Sarnia. They finished the Provincial Championship as the fourth in the province, falling in the bronze medal game to St. Michael's College School of Toronto. In 2024, they made the ROPSSAA final for the second time in two years, ultimately falling short to St. Marcellinus Varsity Boys Basketball team.

== Academics ==
Notre Dame offers courses in the International Baccalaureate (IB) program. IB students at Notre Dame are able to take courses in higher level English, chemistry, and history, as well as standard level French, mathematics, physics, and biology. In addition to these subjects, IB students must participate in the compulsory course Theory of Knowledge. Students are also required to engage in 150 Creativity, Activity and Service hours.

Various Notre Dame IB classes have had the special opportunity to attend TEDxIB at York School in Toronto. Notre Dame has been represented at the conference by Adrienne Mallari in 2011 and by Ewalina Jeyanesan in 2012.

== Community activism ==
Students take part in a semi-annual food drive, consistently donating at least 10,000 pounds of non-perishable food and other commodities; these are then given to a local food bank. One student in 2008 managed to collect over 1.2 tonnes of food. That year, Notre Dame as a whole collected about 16,308 pounds of food for the Ste. Louise Outreach Centre. The school has since escalated in their participation in this event, setting for itself a current record of over 42,000 pounds of food collected in one drive.

== Notable alumni ==
- Jeff Adams, wheelchair track Canadian Paralympian
- Promise David, professional Canadian soccer player
- Phil Oreskovic, NHL and OHL player
- Melissa Grelo, Canadian Television Personality cohost of The Social (Canadian TV series) and Your Morning on CTV
- Steven Bednarski, historian and actor
- Trey Anthony, executive producer and star of Da Kink In My Hair
- Dave Thomas (basketball), former National Basketball League of Canada basketball player
- Tory Lanez, rapper/singer
- Steven Halko, NHL player
- Atiba Hutchinson, professional Canadian soccer player
- Fernand Kashama, CFL player
- Kalonji Kashama, CFL player
- Jerome Messam, CFL player
- Zach Pop, Major League Baseball player
- Jamaal Westerman, NFL and CFL player
- Jabar Westerman, CFL player

== See also ==
- Education in Ontario
- List of secondary schools in Ontario
