= Andrew Gaze =

Australian basketball player (born 1965)

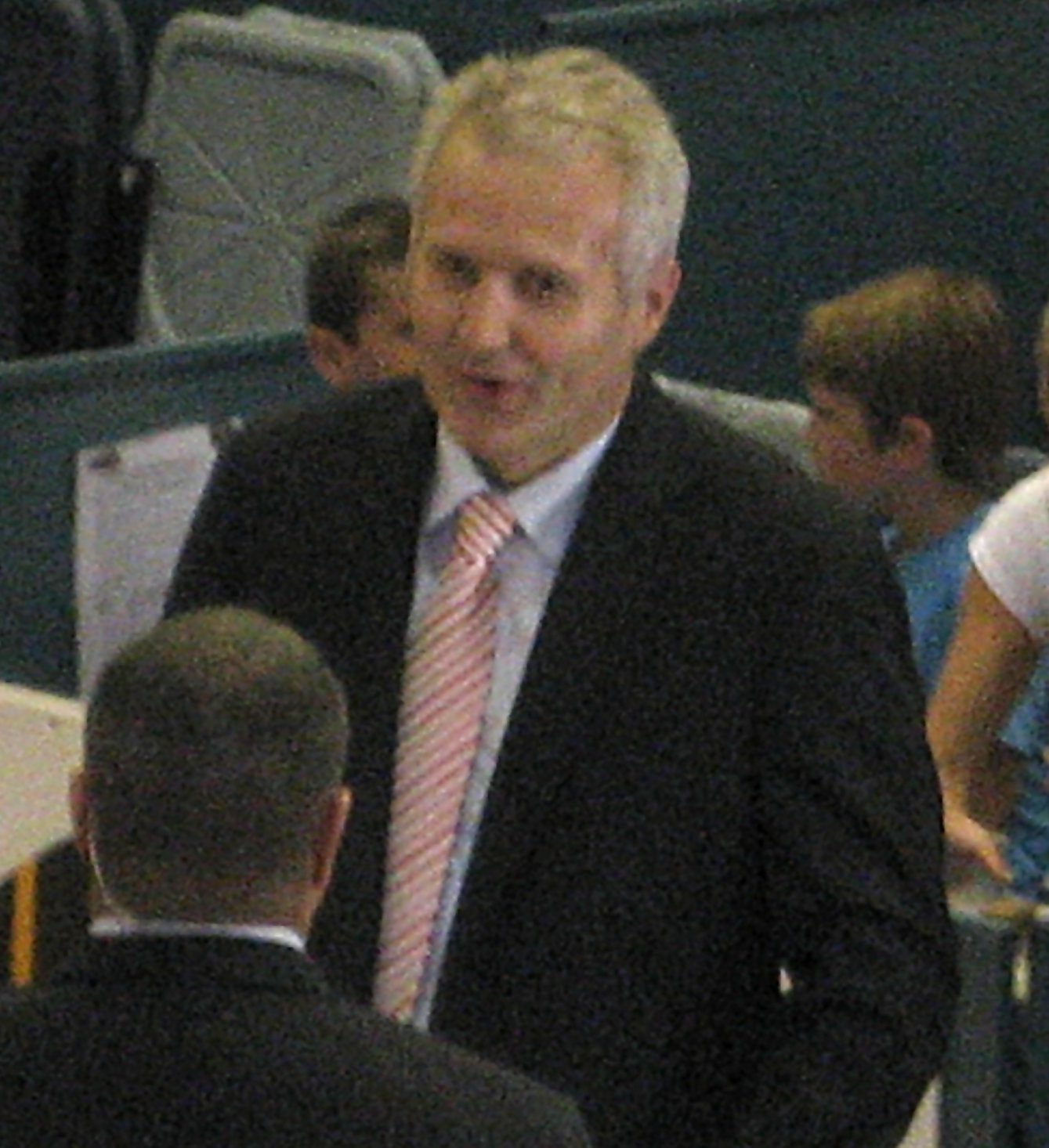
- Gaze at a Melbourne Tigers home game in 2011

Personal information
- Born: 24 July 1965 (age 61) Melbourne, Victoria, Australia
- Listed height: 201 cm (6 ft 7 in)
- Listed weight: 95 kg (209 lb)

Career information
- High school: Albert Park College (Melbourne, Victoria)
- College: Seton Hall (1988–1989)
- NBA draft: 1989: undrafted
- Playing career: 1984–2005
- Position: Shooting guard
- Number: 10, 4
- Coaching career: 2016–present

Career history

Playing
- 1984–2005: Melbourne Tigers
- 1991–1992: Udine
- 1994: Washington Bullets
- 1995: Apollon Patras
- 1999: San Antonio Spurs

Coaching
- 2016–2017: Melbourne Tigers (NBL1 South)
- 2016–2019: Sydney Kings
- 2022–present: Melbourne Tigers (NBL1 South)

Career highlights
- NBA champion (1999); 2× NBL champion (1993, 1997); 7× NBL MVP (1991, 1992, 1994–1998); 11× NBL All-Star (1988–1997, 2004); 2× NBL All-Star Game MVP (1989, 1992); 15× All-NBL First Team (1986–2000); All-NBL Second Team (2001); 8× NBL Most Efficient Player (1990–1997); NBL Rookie of the Year (1984); 14× NBL scoring champion (1986, 1988, 1989, 1991–2001); NBL assist champion (1989); NBL 20th Anniversary Team (1998); NBL 25th Anniversary Team (2003); NBL 40th Anniversary Team (2018); No. 10 retired by Melbourne Tigers; 6× Gaze Medalist (1990, 1994–1996, 1998, 2000); FIBA's 50 Greatest Players (1991); Third-team All-Big East (1989)

Career NBL statistics
- Points: 18,908 (30.8 ppg)
- Rebounds: 3,121 (5.1 rpg)
- Assists: 3,531 (5.8 apg)
- Stats at NBA.com
- Stats at Basketball Reference
- FIBA Hall of Fame

Andrew Barry Casson Gaze AM (born 24 July 1965) is an Australian basketball coach and former player. He played 22 seasons in the National Basketball League (NBL) with the Melbourne Tigers from 1984 to 2005, winning the league's MVP award seven times and winning the scoring title 14 times. He also guided the Tigers to two NBL championships, in 1993 and 1997, and was named an All-NBL First Team member for a record 15 consecutive years. Gaze has been described as one of the greatest players Australia has ever produced.

Gaze led the senior Australian national team, the Boomers, to five Summer Olympic Games – including as the flag bearer at the opening ceremony of the 2000 Sydney Olympics, and he was also the Australian Team Captain. He was inducted into the Australian Basketball Hall of Fame in 2004, and the Sport Australia Hall of Fame in 2005, after being appointed a Member of the Order of Australia in 2002. In 2013, he joined his father, Lindsay, in the FIBA Hall of Fame, after being elected as a player, to become just the third Australian inductee. Two Australian basketball awards have been named in Gaze's honour: the NBL MVP award is named the Andrew Gaze Trophy, and the Australian International Player of the Year award is named the Gaze Medal.

== Early life and family ==
Gaze was born in Melbourne, Victoria, the son of Lindsay and Margaret Gaze. He has an older sister, Janet. Gaze is also the nephew of former Australian Opals coach Tony Gaze and the cousin of Mark Gaze, who played 182 games in the NBL from 1983 to 1991 and represented Australia at the 1982 FIBA World Championship. He is also the second cousin of Canberra Capitals guard Kate Gaze, the daughter of Mark Gaze and former WNBL player Michelle O'Connor.

Gaze grew up at Albert Park Basketball Stadium, the home of the Victorian Basketball Association (VBA), with his father the general manager of the VBA at the time. After graduating from Albert Park College, Gaze pursued a professional basketball career and attended Victoria University in Melbourne.

== Playing career ==
=== NBL and college ===
In 1984, Gaze joined the Melbourne Tigers of the National Basketball League as an 18-year-old. His first season with the Tigers saw him win the NBL Rookie of the Year Award after averaging an impressive 29.1 points, 6.7 rebounds, 4.1 assists and 1.6 steals in 24 games. By 1986, he made his first All-NBL First Team selection. He would go on to earn first-team honours in 15 straight seasons (1986–2000). In the 1987 NBL season, Gaze set an NBL record for points per game in a season when he averaged 44.1 points. This was despite the Tigers finishing the season in last place with a 3–23 record. During the season, Gaze had a 60-point game (against the Newcastle Falcons) and another five 50-point games.

Following the 1988 NBL season, Gaze, who was spotted by talent scouts while playing for Australia at the 1988 Olympics, moved to the United States after being recruited to play college basketball for Seton Hall University. During the 1988–89 season, Gaze played in 38 games for the Seton Hall Pirates, averaging 13.6 points, 4.5 rebounds and 2.9 assists per game. Gaze started every game in The Hall's first-ever run to the NCAA Final Four, twice leading all Pirates scorers with 19 points in their Elite Eight win over UNLV and 20 points (highlighted by 4-from-9 shooting from 3) in the National Semifinal win against Duke. He completed his season at Seton Hall with an 80–79 overtime loss to the Michigan Wolverines in the NCAA Championship Game which was played in front of 39,187 fans at the Kingdome in Seattle, where he was heavily guarded and limited to only five field goal attempts, all from three-point range. After a year in New Jersey, Gaze returned to Australia and re-joined the Tigers for the 1989 NBL season. He missed the back-end of the 1990 NBL season due to a blood clot in his right shoulder.

Not known for being an outstanding athlete, Gaze's heavy scoring in the NBL was due to exceptional shooting, including from three-point range. A crowd favourite to the Tigers faithful, Gaze was a front-runner in the league's resurgence during the 1990s, as he and American import Lanard Copeland combined to form a formidable backcourt and guided the Tigers to two championships in 1993 and 1997. Playing under his father with the Tigers, Gaze assured the team were perpetual finalists.

In his later years, Gaze still managed to score at a high clip for the Tigers, averaging over 19 points per game in each of his last four NBL seasons. Following the 2004–05 NBL season, Gaze announced his retirement from the NBL. In 20 seasons with the Tigers, he played a total of 612 games and recorded 18,908 points at an average of 30.9 points per game.

=== Europe and NBA ===
In addition to playing in the NBL, Gaze spent multiple seasons overseas during the 1990s. In 1991, Gaze became the first Australian male to play professionally in Europe, with Italian 2nd League club Udine. In a six-month stint in Italy, he averaged over 30 points per game. Despite his best efforts, the team finished the league last and was relegated to the 3rd division. In March 1994, Gaze returned to the United States and signed with the NBA's Washington Bullets. In seven games for the Bullets during the 1993–94 NBA season, he averaged 3.1 points per game. In early 1995, he moved to Greece and played half a season for Greek League club Apollon Patras. He had another short stint in the NBA during the lockout-shortened 1998–99 season, this time with the San Antonio Spurs. He received very little court time for a stacked Spurs team that included guards Mario Elie, Avery Johnson, Antonio Daniels and Steve Kerr. He appeared in just 19 games for the Spurs during the regular season and was inactive for the entire playoff run, which saw the Spurs win their first NBA championship.

=== National team ===
On the international stage, Gaze forged his reputation as one of Australia's finest products, appearing at the 1984 Los Angeles Olympic Games, as a 19-year-old. He led all scorers at the 1994 FIBA World Championship with 23.9 points per game, leading the Aussies to a fifth-place finish. In 2000, he became (jointly with American Teresa Edwards) the third basketball player to compete at five Olympics, after Puerto Rican Teófilo Cruz and Brazilian Oscar Schmidt. That year, Gaze was the flag bearer at the opening ceremony of the Sydney Olympics, and he was also the Australian Team Captain. At the 1996 Atlanta Olympics, he led the Boomers to their then best Olympic performance, a fourth-placed finish, with a 5–3 record.

Gaze also competed in four FIBA World Cups with the Boomers, as he played in more than 280 matches for Australia. Gaze is the second all-time career points scorer, behind only Brazil's Oscar Schmidt, in Summer Olympic Games history, and he is third all-time in career points scored in FIBA World Cup history, after Schmidt and Argentina's Luis Scola.

Gaze played 297 games for the Boomers.

== Coaching career ==
=== Sydney Kings ===
In April 2016, Gaze was appointed head coach of the Sydney Kings in the NBL. He served as coach for three seasons before stepping down in 2019.

=== Melbourne Tigers ===
In 2016 and 2017, Gaze served as head coach of the Melbourne Tigers men's team in the SEABL.

On 4 February 2022, Gaze was announced as head coach of the Melbourne Tigers men's team, now in the NBL1 South, for the 2022 NBL1 season. He returned as head coach for the 2023 season and the 2024 season. In 2025, he guided the Tigers to the NBL1 South Grand Final, where they lost 99–80 to the Sandringham Sabres. He re-signed as Tigers coach for the 2026 season and again for the 2027 season.

=== Indiana Pacers ===
In 2017, Gaze joined the coaching staff of the Indiana Pacers for the Orlando Summer League.

== Personal life ==
After retiring from playing professionally, Gaze became a media personality and an NBL commentator for Network Ten and Fox Sports. A fan of the Hawthorn Football Club in the AFL, he has appeared frequently in Australian rules football media, including as a panelist on the Fox Footy show Bounce. In 2006, he appeared in season five of Dancing with the Stars.

Gaze and his wife Melinda have four children; Courtney, Phoebe, Annie and Mason. In 2014, he was named Australian Father of the Year by children's charity The Shepherd Centre.

== Records, honours and awards ==
- Record for most Summer Olympic Games for an Australian basketball player (5 – 1984, 1988, 1992, 1996 and 2000)
- Flag bearer at the opening ceremony of the 2000 Sydney Olympics and the Australian Team Captain
- Inducted into the Australian Basketball Hall of Fame (2004), Sport Australia Hall of Fame (2005), and FIBA Hall of Fame (2013)
  - Elevated to legend status in the Australian Basketball Hall of Fame in 2022
  - Elevated to legend status in the Sport Australia Hall of Fame (2025)
- Appointed a Member of the Order of Australia in 2002
- NBL all-time:
  - 1st in Points – 18,908
  - 1st in Assists – 3,531
  - 1st in Field Goals Made – 6,484
  - 1st in 3-Pointers Made – 1,826
  - 1st in Free Throws Made – 4,114
  - 2nd in Games Played – 612
  - 3rd in Steals – 1,075
- NBL's highest single-season points per game average (44.1) (1987)
- 8× NBL three-point field goal leader (1988, 1989, 1992, 1993, 1996–1999)
- 10× NBL free-throw percentage leader (1990, 1992, 1994–1996, 1999, 2001–2004)
- NBA champion (1999)
- 2× NBL champion (1993, 1997)
- 7× NBL MVP (1991, 1992, 1994–1998)
- 15× All-NBL First Team (1986–2000)
- All-NBL Second Team (2001)
- 14× NBL scoring champion (1986, 1988, 1989, 1991–2001)
- NBL assist champion (1989)
- 11× NBL All-Star (1988–1997, 2004)
- 2× NBL All-Star Game MVP (1989, 1992)
- NBL Rookie of the Year (1984)
- 8× NBL Most Efficient Player (1990–1997)
- 6× Gaze Medalist (1990, 1994–1996, 1998, 2000)
- FIBA's 50 Greatest Players (1991)
- Australian Basketball Hall of Fame (2004)
- Sport Australia Hall of Fame (2005)
- Was named a member of the NBL's 20th, 25th and 40th anniversary teams

== Honour roll ==
| NBL career: | 1984–2005 |
| NBL Championships: | 2× (1993, 1997) |
| NBL Grand Final appearances: | 4× (1992, 1993, 1996, 1997) |
| NBL Most Valuable Player: | 7× (1991, 1992, 1994, 1995, 1996, 1997, 1998) |
| All-NBL First Team: | 15× (1986–2000) |
| NBL Rookie of the Year: | 1984 |
| Gaze Medal: | 6× (1990, 1994, 1995, 1996, 1998, 2000) |
| Australian Basketball Hall of Fame: | 2004 |
| Sport Australia Hall of Fame: | 2005 |
| FIBA Hall of Fame: | 2013 |

== Career statistics ==
=== NBL ===
| † | NBL Championship |

| Year | Team | G | GS | MIN | PTS | AVG. | FG | FGA | PCT. | 3–FG | 3–FGA | PCT. | FT | FTA | PCT. | REB | AST | STL | BLK | TO | PF |
| 1984 | Melbourne Tigers | 24 | 24 | 0.00 | 699 | 29.1 | 11.7 | 18.6 | .576 | 0.5 | 1.6 | .325 | 5.1 | 7.2 | .724 | 6.7 | 4.1 | 1.6 | 0.3 | 2.3 | 3.8 |
| 1985 | Melbourne Tigers | 18 | 18 | 0.00 | 547 | 30.4 | 11.8 | 23.2 | .51 | 2.0 | 6.1 | .336 | 4.6 | 6.4 | .709 | 6.7 | 4.4 | 2.1 | 0.3 | 4.9 | 3.9 |
| 1986 | Melbourne Tigers | 25 | 25 | 0.00 | 922 | 36.9 | 13.8 | 26.1 | .529 | 2.1 | 5.5 | .381 | 7.08 | 8.8 | .805 | 7.3 | 4.4 | 2.1 | 0.2 | 4.0 | 3.4 |
| 1987 | Melbourne Tigers | 20 | 20 | 47.7 | 882 | 44.1 | 15.9 | 30.2 | .526 | 3.4 | 8.6 | .393 | 8.9 | 11 | .809 | 8.2 | 5.8 | 2.5 | 0.1 | 4.8 | 3.3 |
| 1988 | Melbourne Tigers | 24 | 24 | 46.8 | 886 | 36.9 | 13.5 | 26.3 | .523 | 4.1 | 9.5 | .432 | 5.7 | 7.2 | .792 | 6.3 | 4.7 | 2.3 | 0.6 | 3.7 | 3.0 |
| 1989 | Melbourne Tigers | 27 | 27 | 45.7 | 931 | 34.5 | 12.4 | 23 | .539 | 3.8 | 9.7 | .401 | 5.7 | 6.9 | .834 | 5.3 | 7.2 | 2.4 | 0.8 | 4.2 | 3.9 |
| 1990 | Melbourne Tigers | 22 | 22 | 0.00 | 828 | 37.6 | 13.6 | 23.7 | .575 | 3.5 | 9.0 | .385 | 6.8 | 7.8 | .873 | 4.8 | 6.9 | 2.6 | 0.3 | 4.0 | 3.2 |
| 1991 | Melbourne Tigers | 28 | 28 | 46.4 | 1086 | 38.8 | 13.5 | 24.3 | .554 | 3.1 | 9.3 | .333 | 8.6 | 9.9 | .871 | 4.4 | 6.0 | 2.7 | 0.4 | 4.5 | 3.8 |
| 1992 | Melbourne Tigers | 32 | 32 | 46.1 | 1082 | 33.8 | 11.2 | 22.1 | .508 | 2.9 | 8.8 | .331 | 8.3 | 9.6 | .865 | 4.6 | 6.3 | 2.7 | 0.3 | 5.0 | 3.4 |
| 1993 † | Melbourne Tigers | 33 | 33 | 45.8 | 1056 | 32.0 | 10.6 | 20.8 | .511 | 3.1 | 8.0 | .391 | 7.5 | 8.7 | .858 | 4.6 | 6.3 | 2.7 | 0.3 | 5.0 | 3.4 |
| 1994 | Melbourne Tigers | 30 | 30 | 47 | 1001 | 33.4 | 10.9 | 21.2 | .515 | 2.5 | 7.1 | .321 | 9.2 | 10.1 | .905 | 4.8 | 7.2 | 2.4 | 0.2 | 5.7 | 3.3 |
| 1995 | Melbourne Tigers | 29 | 29 | 46.8 | 983 | 33.9 | 11.3 | 22 | .513 | 3.1 | 8.5 | .361 | 8.1 | 9.1 | .898 | 4.2 | 8.0 | 2.3 | 0.5 | 4.5 | 3.3 |
| 1996 | Melbourne Tigers | 35 | 35 | 46.6 | 1089 | 31.1 | 10 | 19.8 | .506 | 3.1 | 8.7 | .358 | 7.9 | 8.7 | .905 | 5.3 | 8.1 | 1.7 | 0.5 | 4.7 | 3.1 |
| 1997 † | Melbourne Tigers | 35 | 35 | 47.9 | 1080 | 30.9 | 10.4 | 20.1 | .520 | 4.0 | 10.4 | .390 | 5.8 | 6.7 | .857 | 4.6 | 6.7 | 1.4 | 0.4 | 4.5 | 3.5 |
| 1998 | Melbourne Tigers | 32 | 32 | 47.5 | 1007 | 31.5 | 10.6 | 21.3 | .497 | 3.9 | 10.5 | .375 | 6.2 | 7.0 | .893 | 4.6 | 6.5 | 1.4 | 0.2 | 3.7 | 3.0 |
| 1998–99 | Melbourne Tigers | 17 | 17 | 47.6 | 569 | 30.9 | 11.4 | 21.3 | .534 | 4.4 | 11.1 | .421 | 5.9 | 6.6 | .893 | 4.6 | 5.5 | 2.2 | 0.1 | 3.6 | 2.4 |
| 1999–2000 | Melbourne Tigers | 31 | 31 | 47.2 | 904 | 30.9 | 9.5 | 19.6 | .488 | 3.0 | 9.0 | .344 | 6.9 | 7.8 | .881 | 5.7 | 6.5 | 1.5 | 0.2 | 3.7 | 3.0 |
| 2000–01 | Melbourne Tigers | 28 | 28 | 46.4 | 816 | 29.1 | 9.4 | 18.5 | .508 | 3.0 | 8.6 | .357 | 7.2 | 7.8 | .914 | 6.3 | 5.8 | 0.9 | 0.2 | 4.8 | 3.9 |
| 2001–02 | Melbourne Tigers | 24 | 24 | 36.6 | 458 | 19.1 | 6 | 13.1 | .457 | 1.6 | 6.2 | .265 | 5.4 | 6.1 | .884 | 4.0 | 5.0 | 0.7 | 0.5 | 3.3 | 2.9 |
| 2002–03 | Melbourne Tigers | 29 | 29 | 42.1 | 640 | 22.1 | 6.6 | 14.2 | .469 | 2.5 | 7.9 | .346 | 6.0 | 6.7 | .893 | 4.0 | 4.7 | 1.1 | 0.5 | 4.2 | 3.6 |
| 2003–04 | Melbourne Tigers | 35 | 35 | 38.8 | 746 | 21.3 | 7 | 13.6 | .514 | 2.5 | 6.9 | .364 | 4.7 | 5.2 | .902 | 3.3 | 3.5 | 0.9 | 0.4 | 2.8 | 2.8 |
| 2004–05 | Melbourne Tigers | 34 | 34 | 35.1 | 696 | 22.1 | 6.6 | 13.6 | .484 | 2.3 | 6.8 | .348 | 4.8 | 5.8 | .829 | 3.1 | 3.1 | 0.8 | 0.3 | 2.4 | 2.4 |
| Career | | 612 | 612 | 38.7 | 18.908 | 30.9 | 10.5 | 20.4 | .518 | 3.0 | 8.1 | .365 | 6.7 | 7.8 | .860 | 5.1 | 5.8 | 1.8 | 0.4 | 4.1 | 3.3 |

=== NBA ===
| † | NBA Championship |

| Year | Team | GP | GS | MPG | FG% | 3P% | FT% | RPG | APG | SPG | BPG | PPG |
|---|---|---|---|---|---|---|---|---|---|---|---|---|
| 1993–94 | Washington | 7 | 0 | 10.0 | .471 | .500 | 1.000 | 1.0 | .7 | .3 | .1 | 3.1 |
| 1998–99 | San Antonio | 19 | 0 | 3.1 | .320 | .313 | .000 | .3 | '.3 | .1 | .1 | 1.1 |
| Career | | 26 | 0 | 4.9 | .381 | .375 | 1.000 | .5 | .4 | .2 | .1 | 1.7 |

=== College ===
| Year | Team | G | GS | MIN | PTS | AVG. | FG | FGA | PCT. | 3–FG | 3–FGA | PCT. | FT | FTA | PCT. | REB | AST | STL | BLK | TO | PF |
| 1988–89 | Seton Hall | 38 | 37 | 32.6 | 516 | 13.6 | 5.5 | 8.8 | .509 | 2.5 | 5.8 | .425 | 2.2 | 3.0 | .726 | 4.5 | 2.8 | 2.9 | 2.1 | 0.4 | 1.3 |

== See also ==
- List of athletes with the most appearances at Olympic Games

== Bibliography ==
=== Contributor ===
- Gaze, Andrew (2007). "Contributor". Laugh Even Louder!. By Camp Quality. Gosford, New South Wales: Scholastic Australia Pty Limited. ISBN 978-1-74169-022-4.
