= Warrick Giddey =

Australian basketball player

Personal information
- Born: 16 December 1967 (age 58) Coledale, New South Wales, Australia
- Listed height: 196 cm (6 ft 5 in)
- Listed weight: 102 kg (225 lb)

Career information
- High school: Keira (Wollongong, Australia)
- Playing career: 1987–2002
- Position: Forward

Career history

Playing
- 1987–1988: Illawarra Hawks
- 1989–2002: Melbourne Tigers

Coaching
- 2022–2023: Melbourne Tigers (women's)

Career highlights
- 2× NBL champion (1993, 1997); No. 6 retired by Melbourne Tigers

Warrick Giddey (born 16 December 1967) is an Australian basketball coach and former professional player. He played in the National Basketball League (NBL) for the Illawarra Hawks and Melbourne Tigers from 1987 to 2002. Giddey won two NBL championships with the Tigers in 1993 and 1997.

== Early life ==
Giddey was a star athlete at Keira High School in Wollongong, where in 1985 he was selected to represent the Australian Schoolboys in rugby league, rugby union, and basketball.

He was the first student to ever represent the Australian Schoolboys in both rugby codes in the same year.

== Playing career ==
Giddey played 449 games in the National Basketball League (NBL) for the Illawarra Hawks and Melbourne Tigers. Giddey won two NBL championships as a member of the Tigers in 1993 and 1997.

Giddey's number 6 was retired by the Tigers and his jersey hangs in the rafters of John Cain Arena.

== Post-playing career ==
Giddey remained associated with the Tigers after his playing retirement. He ran the Community and School programs for the team under its new name Melbourne United. He previously worked as an assistant coach and in club administration.

On 4 February 2022, Giddey was named as head coach of the Melbourne Tigers women's team for the 2022 NBL1 South season. He returned as head coach for the 2023 season.

== Personal life ==
Giddey's wife, Kim, played in the Women's National Basketball League. Their son, Josh, played in the NBL for the Adelaide 36ers and was selected sixth in the 2021 NBA draft by the Oklahoma City Thunder. Their daughter, Hannah, plays college basketball for the Southern Nazarene University.
