= Melbourne United =

Australian basketball team

- 2026–27 Melbourne United season
- League: NBL
- Founded: 1984; 42 years ago
- History: Melbourne Tigers; 1984–2014; Melbourne United; 2014–present
- Arena: John Cain Arena
- Capacity: 10,500
- Location: Melbourne, Victoria
- Team colours: Navy, cobalt, white, grey
- CEO: Nick Truelson
- General manager: Mark Boyd
- Head coach: Jacob Chance
- Team captain: Chris Goulding
- Ownership: Travis Knipe; Aaron Sansoni
- Championships: 6 (1993, 1997, 2006, 2008, 2018, 2021)
- Retired numbers: 6 (6, 8, 10, 21, 25, 50)
- Website: MelbourneUtd.com.au
Home	Away	Third

Melbourne United are an Australian professional basketball team based in Melbourne, Victoria. United compete in the National Basketball League (NBL) and play their home games at John Cain Arena.

The team made their debut in the NBL in 1984 as the Melbourne Tigers. The Tigers were led by coach Lindsay Gaze and his son Andrew from 1984 until 2005, with the pair guiding the Tigers to two championships in the 1990s. The pair were supported by fellow club legends such as Dave Simmons, Lanard Copeland and Mark Bradtke. Four consecutive NBL Grand Finals followed between 2006 and 2009, with championships coming in 2006 and 2008 behind the likes of Chris Anstey and Darryl McDonald. After 31 seasons known as the Melbourne Tigers, the franchise underwent a controversial rebrand in 2014, changing the name of the team to Melbourne United. United won NBL championships in 2018 and 2021. The franchise's six championships is tied second with Sydney Kings (six) and behind the Perth Wildcats (ten) for championships won.

== Franchise history ==
=== Early history ===
The history of the Melbourne Tigers originated in 1931 with the birth of the Victorian Basketball Association (VBA). The Melbourne Tigers name was established in 1975 and the team debuted in the South East Australian Basketball League (SEABL) in 1981. After winning the SEABL championship in 1983, the Tigers joined the National Basketball League (NBL).

=== Gaze era (1984–2005) ===
The Melbourne Tigers debuted in the NBL in the 1984 season. The Tigers initially struggled in the NBL due to a lack of financial resources. During the early struggles of the 1980s, the Tigers were led by coach Lindsay Gaze and his son Andrew. Andrew Gaze was a prolific scorer, as he set a still-standing NBL record with 44.1 points per game for the 1987 season. During the year, he had a 60-point game against the Newcastle Falcons. Despite his dominance, the Tigers finished with a 3–23 record. The addition of imports David Colbert and Dave Simmons in 1989 saw the Tigers make their first-ever finals appearance.

Melbourne Tigers logo (1998–2006)

The addition of Lanard Copeland in 1992 led to the Tigers reaching their maiden NBL Grand Final series, where they were defeated 2–1 by the South East Melbourne Magic. Joining Gaze, Copeland and Simmons in 1993 was Mark Bradtke, as the foursome led the Tigers back to the NBL Grand Final, where they faced the Perth Wildcats. Having split the first two games, Game 3 in Perth went down to the wire. It was a fitting maiden championship win for Andrew and Lindsay Gaze, with the father-son duo embracing following the game.

Melbourne's championship banners

The Tigers returned to the NBL Grand Final in 1996, where they were once again beaten 2–1 by the South East Melbourne Magic. Following the 1996 season, the Tigers parted ways with Dave Simmons. The 1997 season began with import Jarvis Lang being released and replaced by Marcus Timmons. Behind Gaze, Copeland, Bradtke and Timmons, the Tigers reached their fourth NBL Grand Final series, as they finished the 1997 season on a 17–1 run that included a record 16-game winning streak. They once again faced the Magic, this time claiming a 2–1 victory to win their second NBL Championship.

The Tigers were unable to recapture their championship form throughout the rest of the 1990s and the early 2000s. In 2002, the franchise entered into private ownership after the organisation had racked up a $2 million debt. A new ownership consortium under Melbourne businessman Seamus McPeake and the Gazes saw financial stability restored to the organisation for the 2002–03 season.

=== New championship era (2005–2009) ===
Melbourne Tigers logo (2006–2012)

The Gaze era ended in 2005 with the retirement of coach Lindsay and the sport's greatest Australian player, Andrew. In addition, the Tigers parted ways with both Mark Bradtke and Lanard Copeland. Darryl McDonald and imports Rashad Tucker and Dave Thomas were joined by Chris Anstey for the 2005–06 season. Fellow stalwarts in the team included Daryl Corletto, Stephen Hoare and Tommy Greer. Behind coach Al Westover, the Tigers reached the 2006 NBL Grand Final series, where they swept the Sydney Kings 3–0.

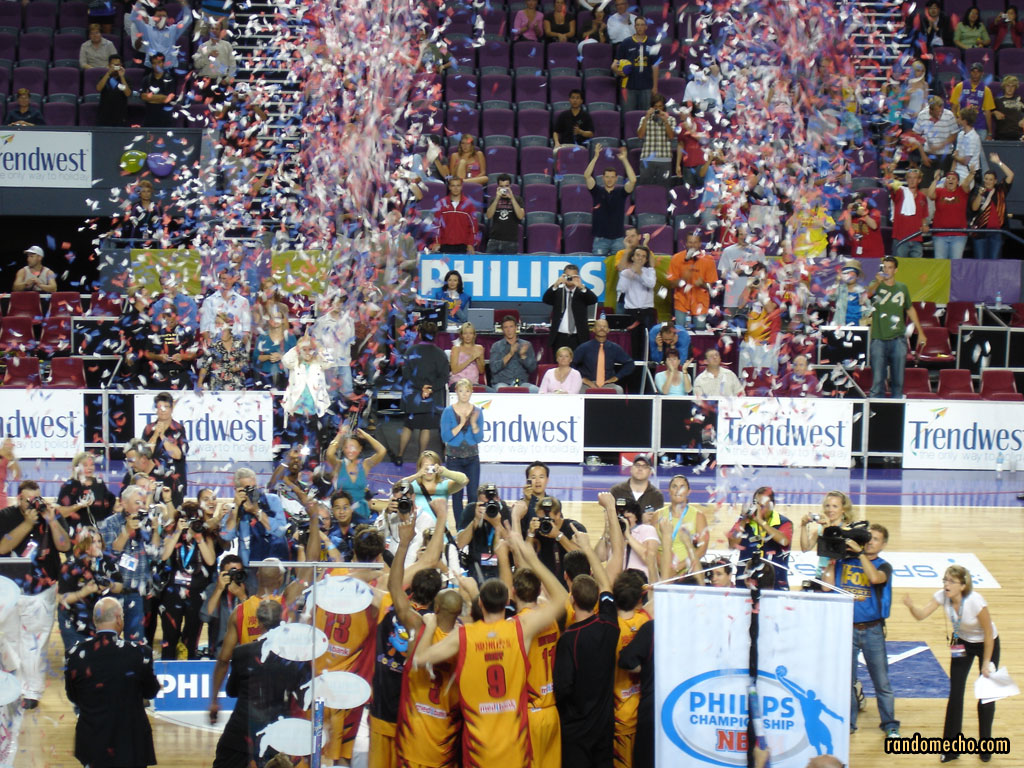
The Tigers winning the 2006 NBL championship

The 2006–07 season saw the Tigers return to the NBL Grand Final, where they were defeated 3–1 by the Brisbane Bullets. The 2007 off-season saw the Tigers acquire David Barlow and Nathan Crosswell, joining a core of Anstey, McDonald, Thomas, Corletto, Hoare and Greer. Import Sean Lampley joined the Tigers mid-season and helped them reach their third straight NBL Grand Final, where they once again faced the Sydney Kings. The series was tied at 2–2 heading into the deciding Game 5. Game 5 saw the Tigers complete the job they were so close to doing in Game 4 at home by winning 85–73 at the Kingdome to celebrate Darryl McDonald's last game in style. Both Anstey and Thomas finished with 21 points and 12 rebounds. In 2008, the Tigers acquired the services of Sam Mackinnon and Ebi Ere, while long-time swingman Dave Thomas departed for Cairns. However, following an injury to Mackinnon and the mid-season departure of Rod Grizzard, Thomas and Luke Kendall were acquired in January 2009. The 2008–09 season saw the Tigers return to the NBL Grand Final for a fourth straight year, but they were defeated 3–2 by the South Dragons.

=== End of Tigers era (2009–2014) ===
Melbourne Tigers logo (2012–2014)

In May 2009, the Tigers made a short-lived decision to sit out the 2009–10 season, after losing money in 2008–09 for the first time in five years. The franchise felt that NBL reforms had not gone far enough to make it feasible to play. They ultimately continued on in the now eight-team competition in 2009–10.

Sam Mackinnon continued on with the Tigers in 2009, while Mark Worthington was acquired following the demise of the South Dragons. Star imports Ebi Ere and Dave Thomas parted ways with Melbourne after the franchise decided to go with an 'all-Australian' roster. The policy was short-lived as Julius Hodge joined the Tigers in November, while Mike Rose joined the squad in January.

In the off-season of 2010, the Tigers roster was dismantled after the departure of Hodge, Worthington and Nathan Crosswell, as well as the retirements of NBL greats Mackinnon and Anstey. The team picked up imports TJ Campbell and Eric Devendorf, as well as Australians Cameron Tragardh, Matt Burston, Wade Helliwell, Luke Nevill and Lucas Walker. Corletto and Greer continued on with the Tigers, as did Bennie Lewis. 2010 NBL MVP Corey Williams joined the squad in November in place of the outgoing Campbell, while Nevill and Devendorf were let go in February. Club legend Darryl McDonald completed the 2010–11 season as coach of the Tigers following the sacking of Al Westover.

In the off-season of 2011, the Tigers acquired the services of coach Trevor Gleeson, and recruited Ayinde Ubaka, Ron Dorsey and Daniel Dillon from Cairns. They also acquired Liam Rush to go along with the addition of Patty Mills for the duration of the 2011 NBA lockout. In January 2012, following a 13-point loss to the Gold Coast Blaze, owner Seamus McPeake made a post-game address to the playing group and then sacked Ubaka on the spot, while Gleeson was at a press conference.

In 2012, the Tigers acquired Chris Goulding, Nate Tomlinson, Adam Ballinger, and imports Seth Scott and Kevin Braswell. Burston, Walker, Rush, Lewis and Greer continued on, while club legend Chris Anstey became head coach. In November of the 2012–13 season, Jonny Flynn replaced Braswell, but the Tigers missed the post-season for the fourth straight year.

The 2013–14 season saw the return of Mark Worthington to the Tigers, while Goulding, Tomlinson, Ballinger, Walker and Greer all continued on under Anstey. Ayinde Ubaka had a short-lived stint with the Tigers to begin the season, before Mustapha Farrakhan Jr. replaced him in November to team up alongside fellow import Scott Morrison. Goulding was key to the Tigers reaching the finals for the first time since 2009, where they lost to the Adelaide 36ers in the semis.

=== Melbourne United (2014–present) ===
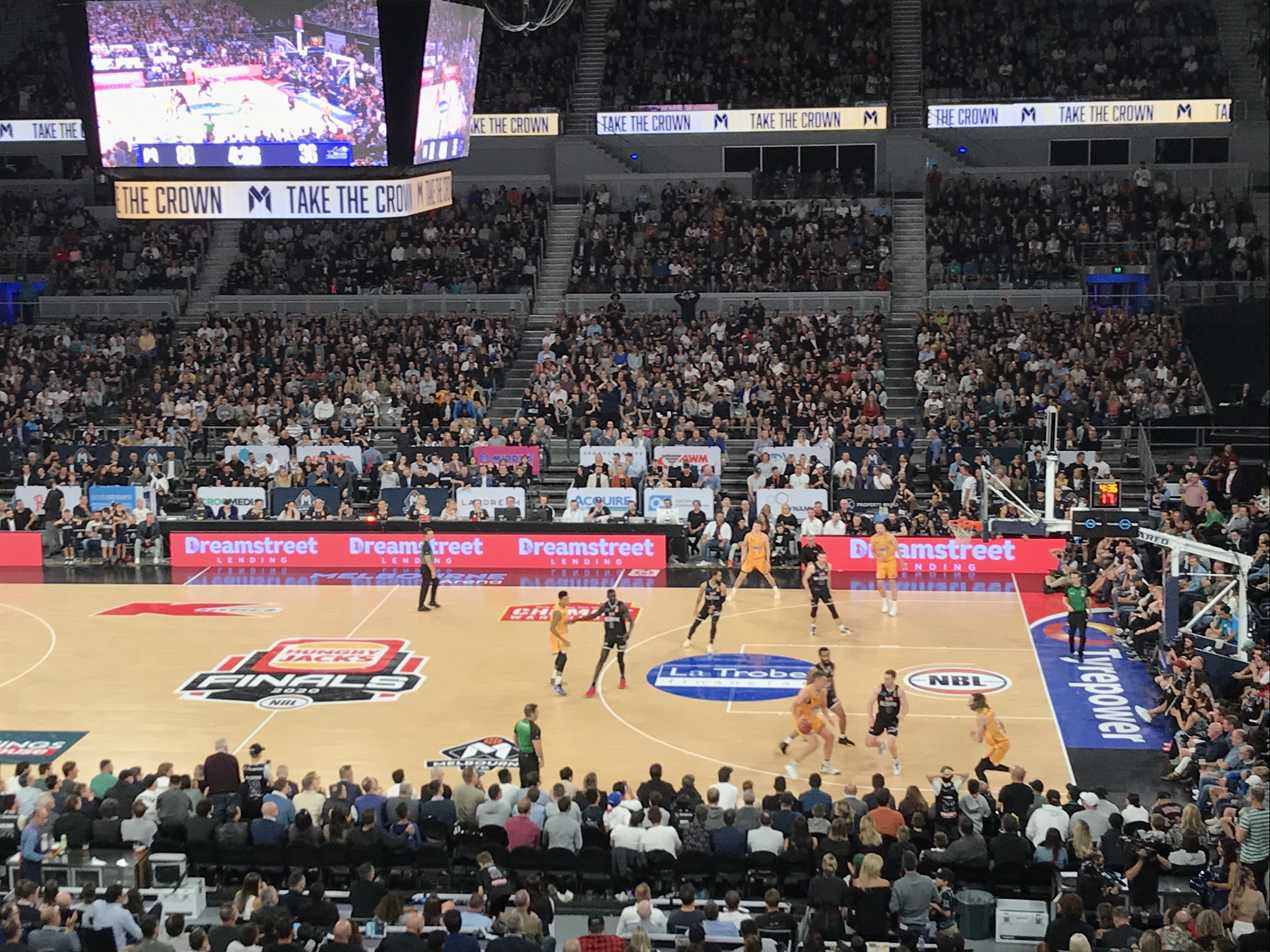
Melbourne United and Sydney Kings at Melbourne Arena

On 20 May 2014, the franchise was rebranded as Melbourne United. The change was made to symbolise the connection to all of Victorian basketball, with the navy blue logo of Melbourne United becoming the new face of professional basketball in Victoria, replacing the Melbourne Tigers brand. Owner Larry Kestelman wanted to end the partisan divisions between the Tigers (which was also a domestic association) and other Victorian supporters and bring the state together behind one NBL team. The change was met with strong opposition from members, fans and past legends such as Andrew Gaze and Lanard Copeland, with the latter even stating he wanted his jersey "taken down from the rafters".

Melbourne United logo (2014–2024)

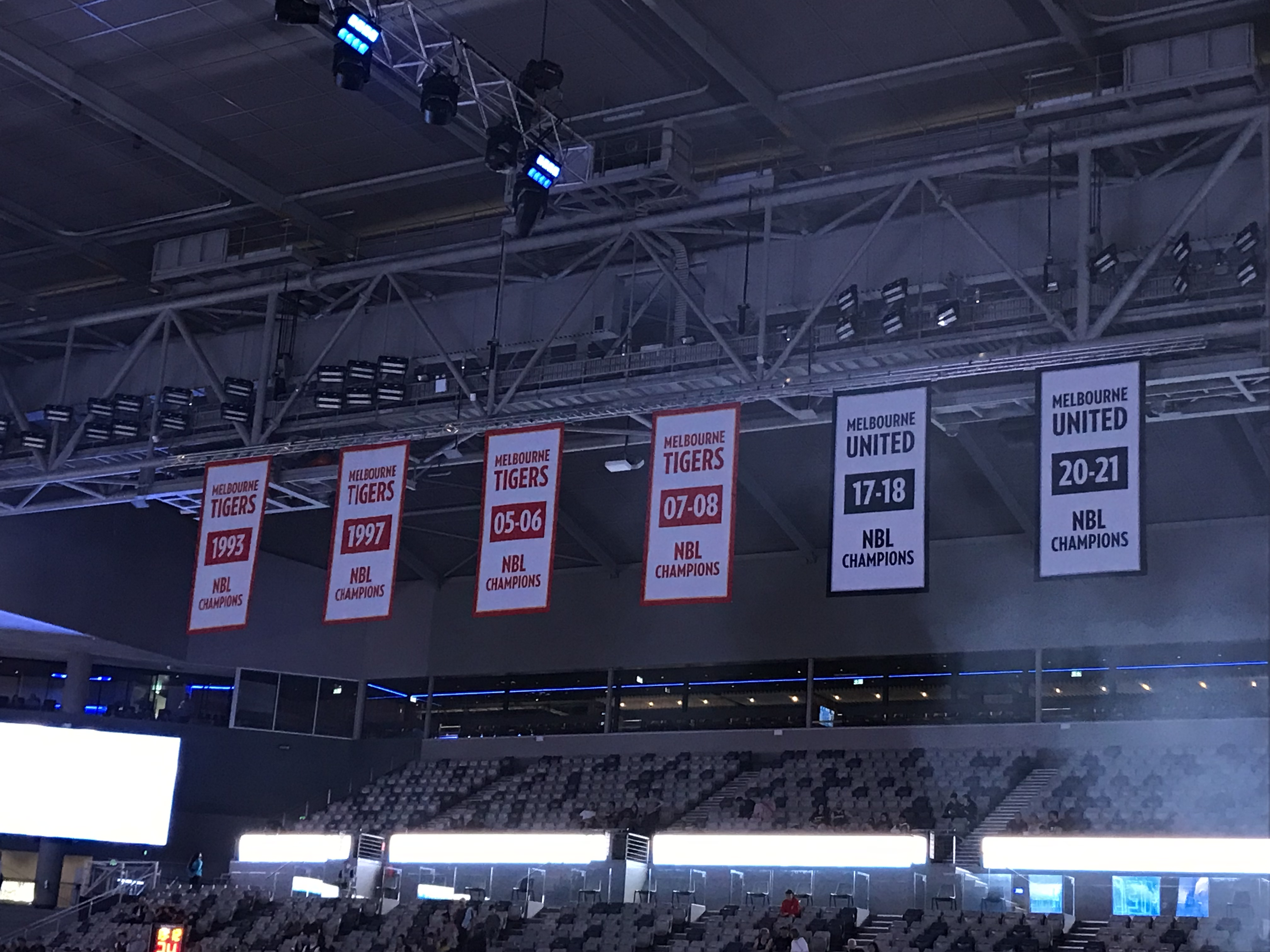
Melbourne's new championship banners

Tigers legend Daryl Corletto returned to the franchise in 2014 after three years with the New Zealand Breakers, while David Barlow returned after five years in Europe following the retirement of Tommy Greer. Mark Worthington, Lucas Walker and Nate Tomlinson continued on from the Tigers to United, while Daniel Kickert joined the squad alongside imports Jordan McRae and Stephen Dennis. Following an 89–61 loss to the Cairns Taipans in the 2014–15 season opener, coach Chris Anstey resigned and was replaced by his assistant Darryl McDonald in the interim. United went on to finish their inaugural season in fifth place with a 13–15 record.

In 2015, United hired Dean Demopoulos as coach and acquired swingman Todd Blanchfield. The franchise also welcomed back Chris Goulding after he spent the 2014–15 season in Spain. With Kickert and Tomlinson continuing on, United recruited Majok Majok alongside imports Hakim Warrick and Stephen Holt. Brad Hill was signed as an injury-replacement for Barlow prior to the season after Barlow suffered a season-ending Achilles injury. Melbourne went on to claim the minor premiership in 2015–16 with a first-place finish and an 18–10 record, before losing to the fourth-seeded New Zealand Breakers in the semi-finals.

In 2016, Goulding, Blanchfield, Majok and Tomlinson were joined by new recruits Tai Wesley and David Andersen. Barlow also returned to the line-up after recovering from the Achilles injury. United started the 2016–17 season with imports Cedric Jackson, Devin Williams and Ramone Moore, but ultimately replaced all three mid-season with Casper Ware, Josh Boone and Lasan Kromah respectively. While Kromah failed to make an impact, Ware and Boone led Melbourne to a late-season finals charge, only to miss out by two games.

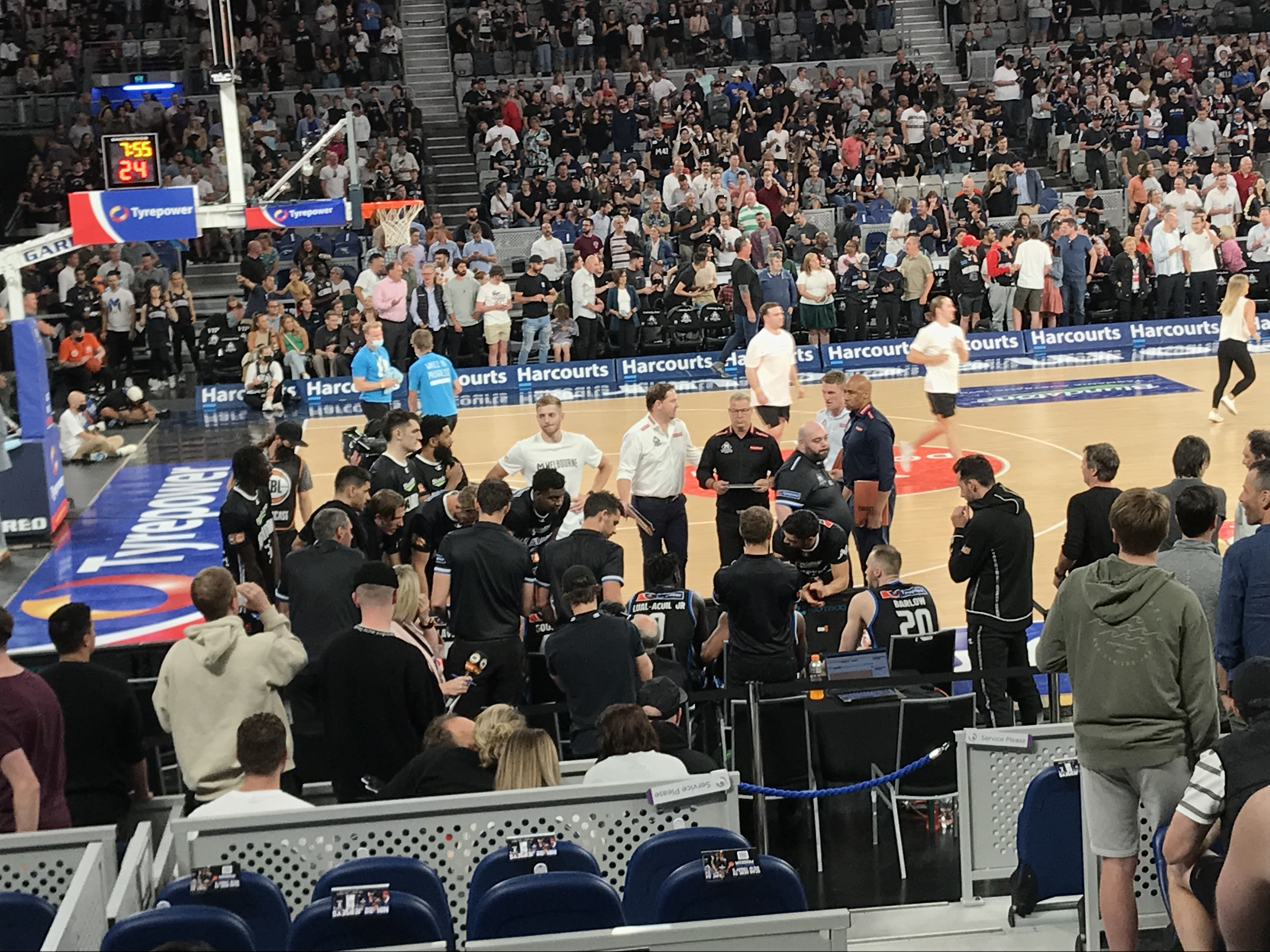
Melbourne United team bench in 2021, with Dean Vickerman as head coach

The 2017 off-season saw the departure of Dean Demopoulos and the hiring of Dean Vickerman as head coach. Under Demopoulos, United underachieved due to a one-dimensional game plan and a lack of direction at the defensive end. With Vickerman came a cultural shift based around sharing the wealth offensively and leading from within. With a returning cast of Goulding, Ware, Boone, Wesley, Andersen, Barlow and Majok, United acquired the services of Casey Prather, a swingman coming off back-to-back championships with the Perth Wildcats. United also signed former one-time Melbourne Tiger Daniel Dillon, but an Achilles injury to Dillon forced the team to sign Peter Hooley in his place. United were title favourites at the start of the 2017–18 season, but fell to a 2–3 record following a loss to the Brisbane Bullets in Round 4. In December, Prather went down with a possible season-ending elbow injury and was replaced by Carrick Felix. With defensive-minded Felix in the line-up, United went 9–1. Felix was removed from Melbourne's active roster in mid-February following Prather's return from injury. United finished the regular season as minor premiers for the second time in three years, earning a 20–8 record. They went on to sweep the Breakers in the semi-finals to reach the 2018 NBL Grand Final series. There they faced the Adelaide 36ers. With the series tied at 2–2 heading into the deciding Game 5, Ware and Goulding each scored 23 points with Prather adding 19 points, 11 rebounds and five steals to lead United to a 100–82 win, as the franchise claimed their first NBL Championship under the new moniker. Goulding was named grand final MVP.

In the 2018–19 NBL season, United returned to the NBL Grand Final series, where they lost 3–1 to the Perth Wildcats.

In the 2020–21 NBL season, United were crowned minor premiers with a 28–8 record behind the likes of Goulding, Jock Landale, Scotty Hopson and Mitch McCarron. They reached their third grand final in four years with a 2–1 semi-final series win over their crosstown rivals the South East Melbourne Phoenix. They went on to sweep the Perth Wildcats in the grand final series 3–0 to win their second championship as United and sixth as a franchise. Landale was named grand final MVP.

In the 2021–22 NBL season, United were crowned minor premiers for the second year in a row.

In the 2023–24 NBL season, United finished as minor premiers and returned to the NBL Grand Final series, where they lost 3–2 to the Tasmania JackJumpers.

In the 2024–25 NBL season, United returned to the NBL Grand Final series, where they lost 3–2 to the Illawarra Hawks. Despite United losing the series, Matthew Dellavedova was awarded the Larry Sengstock Medal as the NBL Grand Final MVP, something that had not happened since 1993.

== Home arena ==
The Melbourne Tigers played out of their traditional home, the 2,000 seat Albert Park Basketball Stadium, from 1984 to 1987 before moving into the 7,200-capacity Melbourne Sports and Entertainment Centre (more commonly known as The Glass House) in 1988. The Tigers played in The Glass House (which it shared with the North Melbourne Giants) from 1987 to 1991 before they and new team South East Melbourne Magic both moved into the 14,820-seat National Tennis Centre in 1992. The centre could hold up to 15,400 for basketball (almost 2,000 more than the Brisbane Entertainment Centre which at 13,500 had been the largest venue since 1986), easily making it the largest venue in the NBL at the time. The Tigers enjoyed success at the Tennis Centre, winning the NBL championship in 1993 and again in 1997 as well as making the Grand Final in 1992 and 1996. In 1996, the Tigers and Magic set a then NBL record attendance of 15,366 for a regular season game at the Tennis Centre, while the 1996 Grand Final series between the two Melbourne rivals set an NBL record aggregate attendance of 43,605 over the 3-game series, a record that still stands as of the 2016–17 NBL season.

Citing the rising costs of playing games at the Tennis Centre, the Tigers moved to the newly built, 10,500 capacity Vodafone Arena (now John Cain Arena) in 2000. Located next door to the Tennis Centre, the Tigers remained at Vodafone until 2002 before they moved again into the smaller (3,500 seat) State Netball and Hockey Centre.

Since 2012, the club has split its games between John Cain Arena and the Netball Centre, but in 2015 also played games at the newly renovated Margaret Court Arena which (as part of the Melbourne Park tennis complex) had been given a retractable-roof as well as an upgrade from 6,000 to 7,500 seats. In 2016–17, Melbourne United will play most of its games at John Cain Arena with a select number of games played at the Netball Centre during January due to the Australian Open tennis (John Cain Arena is the second largest arena at Melbourne Park).

Melbourne's all-time home game attendance record was set on 11 July 1994 when 15,129 attended a Round 14 game between the Tigers and South East Melbourne at the Tennis Centre. As Melbourne United, the team's record home attendance of 10,300 was set on 4 December 2016 against the New Zealand Breakers at Melbourne Arena during Round 9 of the 2016–17 NBL season.

- Albert Park Basketball Stadium (1984–1987)
- Melbourne Entertainment Centre (1988–1991)
- Rod Laver Arena (1992–2000)
- John Cain Arena (2000–2002, 2012–present)
- State Netball Hockey Centre (2002–2017)
- Margaret Court Arena (2014–2016)

Since 2018, United have trained and had their head offices located at the Melbourne Sports and Aquatic Centre in Albert Park.

== Honour roll ==
NBL Championships:	6 (1993, 1997, 2006, 2008, 2018, 2021)
Regular Season Champions:	7 (1994, 1996, 2016, 2018, 2021, 2022, 2024)
NBL Finals Appearances:	30 (1989–2000, 2002–2009, 2014, 2016, 2018–2022, 2024, 2025, 2026)
NBL Grand Final appearances:	13 (1992, 1993, 1996, 1997, 2006, 2007, 2008, 2009, 2018, 2019, 2021, 2024, 2025)
NBL Most Valuable Players:	Andrew Gaze (1991, 1992, 1994, 1995, 1996, 1997, 1998), Mark Bradtke (2002), Chris Anstey (2006, 2008)
NBL Grand Final MVPs:	Lanard Copeland (1997), Chris Anstey (2006, 2008), Chris Goulding (2018), Jock Landale (2021)
All-NBL First Team:	Andrew Gaze (1986–2000; 15 times), Mark Bradtke (1994, 1996, 1997, 1999–2005; 10 times), Lanard Copeland (1999, 2002), Chris Anstey (2006, 2007, 2008, 2009), Dave Thomas (2007), Ebi Ere (2009), Mark Worthington (2010), Seth Scott (2013), Chris Goulding (2014, 2016, 2024), Daniel Kickert (2016), Casper Ware (2017, 2018, 2019), Josh Boone (2018), Jock Landale (2021), Jo Lual-Acuil (2022)
All-NBL Second Team:	Dave Simmons (1990), Lanard Copeland (1992), Andrew Gaze (2001), Darryl McDonald (2006), Dave Thomas (2006), Corey Williams (2011), Cameron Tragardh (2012), Jonny Flynn (2013), Jordan McRae (2015), Stephen Holt (2016), Tai Wesley (2018), Mitch McCarron (2021), Chris Goulding (2021, 2022, 2023), Matthew Dellavedova (2022), Jo Lual-Acuil (2024)
All-NBL Third Team:	Lanard Copeland (1996), Mark Bradtke (1998), Darryl McDonald (2007), David Barlow (2009), Julius Hodge (2010)
NBL Coach of the Year:	Lindsay Gaze (1989, 1997, 1999), Al Westover (2006), Dean Vickerman (2018, 2019, 2024)
NBL Rookie of the Year:	Andrew Gaze (1984)
NBL Best Sixth Man:	Darryl McDonald (2004), Stephen Hoare (2006, 2007), Hakim Warrick (2016), Jo Lual-Acuil (2021), Shea Ili (2022), Ian Clark (2024)
NBL Best Defensive Player:	Chris Anstey (2008), Shea Ili (2024, 2025)
NBL Most Improved Player:	Nate Tomlinson (2014)

Source: Melbourne United History, Melbourne Tigers History

== Season by season ==
NBL champions	League champions	Runners-up	Finals berth

Season	Tier	League	Regular season					Post-season	Head coach	Captain	Club MVP
Season	Tier	League	Finish	Played	Wins	Losses	Win %	Post-season	Head coach	Captain	Club MVP
Melbourne Tigers
1984	1	NBL	5th	24	11	13	.458	Did not qualify	Lindsay Gaze	Brian Goorjian	Andrew Gaze
1985	1	NBL	13th	26	5	21	.192	Did not qualify	Lindsay Gaze	Andrew Gaze	Andrew Gaze
1986	1	NBL	13th	26	6	20	.231	Did not qualify	Lindsay Gaze	Andrew Gaze	Andrew Gaze
1987	1	NBL	14th	26	3	23	.115	Did not qualify	Lindsay Gaze	Andrew Gaze	Andrew Gaze
1988	1	NBL	12th	24	8	16	.333	Did not qualify	Lindsay Gaze	Andrew Gaze	Andrew Gaze
1989	1	NBL	4th	24	16	8	.667	Lost elimination finals (Sydney) 1–2	Lindsay Gaze	Andrew Gaze	Andrew Gaze
1990	1	NBL	4th	26	17	9	.654	Lost elimination finals (Perth) 0–2	Lindsay Gaze	Andrew Gaze	Andrew Gaze
1991	1	NBL	5th	26	16	10	.615	Lost elimination finals (Adelaide) 0–2	Lindsay Gaze	Andrew Gaze	Andrew Gaze
1992	1	NBL	3rd	24	15	9	.625	Won quarterfinals (Perth) 2–1; Won semifinals (Sydney) 2–1; Lost NBL finals (S.E. Melbourne) 1–2	Lindsay Gaze	Andrew Gaze	Andrew Gaze
1993	1	NBL	3rd	26	16	10	.615	Won quarterfinals (Illawarra) 2–0; Won semifinals (S.E. Melbourne) 2–0; Won NBL finals (Perth) 2–1	Lindsay Gaze	Andrew Gaze	Andrew Gaze
1994	1	NBL	1st	26	19	7	.692	Won quarterfinals (Illawarra) 2–0; Lost semifinals (Adelaide) 0–2	Lindsay Gaze	Andrew Gaze	Andrew Gaze
1995	1	NBL	8th	26	14	12	.538	Lost quarterfinals (Perth) 1–2	Lindsay Gaze	Andrew Gaze	Andrew Gaze
1996	1	NBL	1st	26	21	5	.808	Won quarterfinals (Brisbane) 2–1; Won semifinals (Canberra) 2–1; Lost NBL finals (S.E. Melbourne) 1–2	Lindsay Gaze	Andrew Gaze	Andrew Gaze
1997	1	NBL	2nd	30	19	11	.633	Won semifinals (North Melbourne) 2–0; Won NBL finals (S.E. Melbourne) 2–1	Lindsay Gaze	Andrew Gaze	Andrew Gaze
1998	1	NBL	5th	30	16	14	.533	Lost elimination finals (Brisbane) 0–2	Lindsay Gaze	Andrew Gaze	Andrew Gaze
1998–99	1	NBL	2nd	26	17	9	.654	Won qualifying finals (Brisbane) 2–0; Lost semifinals (Victoria) 0–2	Lindsay Gaze	Andrew Gaze; Mark Bradtke	Lanard Copeland; Andrew Gaze
1999–2000	1	NBL	5th	28	14	14	.500	Lost elimination finals (Victoria) 1–2	Lindsay Gaze	Andrew Gaze	Andrew Gaze
2000–01	1	NBL	7th	28	13	15	.464	Did not qualify	Lindsay Gaze	Andrew Gaze	Andrew Gaze
2001–02	1	NBL	6th	30	16	14	.533	Won qualifying finals (Victoria) 2–1; Lost semifinals (West Sydney) 1–2	Lindsay Gaze	Andrew Gaze	Mark Bradtke
2002–03	1	NBL	6th	30	15	15	.500	Lost qualifying finals (Sydney) 1–2	Lindsay Gaze	Andrew Gaze	Mark Bradtke
2003–04	1	NBL	5th	33	20	13	.606	Won elimination final (Adelaide) 111–107; Lost quarterfinal (Brisbane) 101–112	Lindsay Gaze	Andrew Gaze	Andrew Gaze
2004–05	1	NBL	6th	32	17	15	.531	Won elimination final (Perth) 108–88; Lost quarterfinal (Townsville) 100–112	Lindsay Gaze	Andrew Gaze	Mark Bradtke
2005–06	1	NBL	2nd	32	25	7	.781	Won semifinals (Perth) 2–0; Won NBL finals (Sydney) 3–0	Al Westover	Chris Anstey; Darryl McDonald	Chris Anstey
2006–07	1	NBL	2nd	33	25	8	.758	Won semifinals (Cairns) 2–0; Lost NBL finals (Brisbane) 1–3	Al Westover	Chris Anstey; Darryl McDonald	Chris Anstey
2007–08	1	NBL	2nd	30	22	8	.733	Won semifinals (Brisbane) 2–0; Won NBL finals (Sydney) 3–2	Al Westover	Chris Anstey; Darryl McDonald	Chris Anstey
2008–09	1	NBL	2nd	30	20	10	.750	Won semifinals (New Zealand) 2–0; Lost NBL finals (South) 2–3	Al Westover	Chris Anstey	Chris Anstey; Ebi Ere
2009–10	1	NBL	6th	28	11	17	.393	Did not qualify	Al Westover	Chris Anstey	Mark Worthington
2010–11	1	NBL	7th	28	10	18	.357	Did not qualify	Al Westover; Darryl McDonald	Cameron Tragardh	Corey Williams
2011–12	1	NBL	6th	28	11	17	.393	Did not qualify	Trevor Gleeson	Tommy Greer	Cameron Tragardh
2012–13	1	NBL	5th	28	12	16	.429	Did not qualify	Chris Anstey	Tommy Greer	Chris Goulding
2013–14	1	NBL	3rd	28	15	13	.536	Lost semifinals (Adelaide) 1–2	Chris Anstey	Tommy Greer	Chris Goulding
Melbourne United
2014–15	1	NBL	5th	28	13	15	.464	Did not qualify	Chris Anstey; Darryl McDonald	Nate Tomlinson; Mark Worthington	Mark Worthington
2015–16	1	NBL	1st	28	18	10	.643	Lost semifinals (New Zealand) 0–2	Dean Demopoulos	Nate Tomlinson	Chris Goulding
2016–17	1	NBL	6th	28	13	15	.464	Did not qualify	Dean Demopoulos	David Andersen	Casper Ware
2017–18	1	NBL	1st	28	20	8	.714	Won semifinals (New Zealand) 2–0; Won NBL finals (Adelaide) 3–2	Dean Vickerman	Chris Goulding	Casper Ware
2018–19	1	NBL	2nd	28	18	10	.643	Won semifinals (Sydney) 2–0; Lost NBL finals (Perth) 1–3	Dean Vickerman	Chris Goulding	Casper Ware
2019–20	1	NBL	4th	28	15	13	.536	Lost semifinals (Sydney) 1–2	Dean Vickerman	Chris Goulding	Shawn Long
2020–21	1	NBL	1st	36	28	8	.778	Won semifinals (S.E. Melbourne) 2–1; Won NBL finals (Perth) 3–0	Dean Vickerman	Chris Goulding; Mitch McCarron	Jock Landale
2021–22	1	NBL	1st	28	20	8	.714	Lost semifinals (Tasmania) 1–2	Dean Vickerman	Chris Goulding	Jo Lual-Acuil
2022–23	1	NBL	7th	28	15	13	.536	Did not qualify	Dean Vickerman	Chris Goulding	Chris Goulding
2023–24	1	NBL	1st	28	20	8	.714	Won semifinals (Illawarra) 2–1; Lost NBL finals (Tasmania) 2–3	Dean Vickerman	Chris Goulding	Chris Goulding
2024–25	1	NBL	2nd	29	19	10	.655	Won semifinals (Perth) 2–1; Lost NBL finals (Illawarra) 2–3	Dean Vickerman	Chris Goulding	Chris Goulding
2025–26	1	NBL	5th	33	20	13	.606	Won play-in qualifier (Tasmania) 82–68; Lost play-in game (Perth) 77–95	Dean Vickerman	Chris Goulding	Jesse Edwards
Regular season record				1212	684	528	.564	7 regular season champions			
Finals record				139	75	64	.540	6 NBL championships			

As of the end of the 2025–26 season

*Note: In 1983 and 1984, the NBL was split into Eastern and Western divisions during the regular season.

Source: Melbourne Tigers Year by Year

=== Summary ===
Years	Chairman	CEO	Head coach	Championships	Grand Final Appearances	Finals Appearances
1984–2000	Lindsay Gaze	Lindsay Gaze	Lindsay Gaze	1993, 1997	1992, 1993, 1996, 1997	12, 1989–2000
2000–2005	David Minear	Seamus McPeake	Lindsay Gaze			4, 2002–2005
2006–2009	Greg O'Neill	Seamus McPeake	Al Westover	2006, 2008	2006, 2007, 2008, 2009	4, 2006–2009
2010–2011	Seamus McPeake	Seamus McPeake	Al Westover (2010); Trevor Gleeson (2011); Darryl McDonald (2011)			
2012–2015	Larry Kestelman	Vince Crivelli	Chris Anstey; Darryl McDonald			1, 2014
2015–2021	Larry Kestelman; Craig Hutchison; Simon Hupfeld	Vince Crivelli	Dean Demopoulos; Dean Vickerman	2018, 2021	2018, 2019, 2021	5, 2016, 2018–2021
2021–2026	Simon Hupfeld; Mike Symons	Nick Truelson	Dean Vickerman		2024, 2025	4, 2022, 2024–2026

Source: Melbourne United Board

== Retired jerseys ==
Melbourne Tigers retired numbers
No.	Nat.	Player	Position	Tenure
6	(Australia)	Warrick Giddey	SG/SF	1989–2002
8	(Australia)	Ray Gordon	PG/SG	1984–1986, 1989–1999
10	(Australia)	Andrew Gaze	SG/PG	1984–2005
21	(United States)	Lanard Copeland	SG/SF	1989–2005
25	(United States)	David Simmons	PF/C	1992–1996
50	(Australia)	Mark Bradtke	C/PF	1993–2005

== Current roster ==
Note: Flags indicate national team eligibility at FIBA-sanctioned events. Players may hold other non-FIBA nationalities not displayed.

Melbourne United roster
Players
Coaches

Pos.	No.	Nat.	Name	Ht.	Wt.
F/C	2	(United States)	Oduro, Josh (I)	2.06 m (6 ft 9 in)	109 kg (240 lb)
G	3	(United States)	Anthony, Cole (I)	1.88 m (6 ft 2 in)	84 kg (185 lb)
G	5	(Australia)	Shelley, Austin (NRP)	1.90 m (6 ft 3 in)
G/F	7	(Australia)	Ingles, Joe	2.03 m (6 ft 8 in)	100 kg (220 lb)
F	9	(South Sudan)	Machar, Malith	2.04 m (6 ft 8 in)	92 kg (203 lb)
G	11	(Australia)	D'Angelo, Christian (DP)	1.91 m (6 ft 3 in)	85 kg (187 lb)
G	12	(Australia)	Wilson, Tom	1.94 m (6 ft 4 in)	82 kg (181 lb)
G	13	(Australia)	Macdonald, Sean (injured) (NRP)	1.88 m (6 ft 2 in)	86 kg (190 lb)
F	15	(Australia)	Bowen, Kyle	2.04 m (6 ft 8 in)	101 kg (223 lb)
C	16	(Australia)	Neilson, Harry (TP)	2.10 m (6 ft 11 in)
F	18	(Australia)	Krslovic, Fabijan	2.03 m (6 ft 8 in)	106 kg (234 lb)
F	21	(New Zealand)	Waardenburg, Sam	2.08 m (6 ft 10 in)	100 kg (220 lb)
G/F	23	(Australia)	Travers, Luke	2.01 m (6 ft 7 in)	101 kg (223 lb)
G	24	(Australia)	Hynes, Will (DP)	1.90 m (6 ft 3 in)
G/F	30	(Australia)	Fa'ale, Jai (DP)	1.95 m (6 ft 5 in)
G	43	(Australia)	Goulding, Chris (injured) (C)	1.92 m (6 ft 4 in)	92 kg (203 lb)
F	50	(Australia)	Bradtke, Jensen (DP)	2.08 m (6 ft 10 in)	100 kg (220 lb)
G	51	(New Zealand)	Ili, Shea	1.84 m (6 ft 0 in)	88 kg (194 lb)

Head coach

- (Australia) Jacob Chance

Assistant coach(es)

- (Australia) David Barlow
- (Australia) Rhys Carter
- (Australia) Keegan Crawford

Team manager

- (Australia) Stephan Semerci

Legend

- (C) Team captain
- (DP) Development player
- (IN) Inactive
- (I) Import player
- (TP) Training player
- (NRP) Nominated replacement player
- (NS) Next Star player
- Injured

- Roster
Updated: 13 October 2026

=== Notable past players ===
Note: Flags indicate national team eligibility at FIBA-sanctioned events. Players may hold other non-FIBA nationalities not displayed.

Criteria

To appear in this section a player must have either:

- Set a club record or won an individual award while at the club
- Played at least one official international match for their national team at any time
- Played at least one official NBA match at any time.

- (Australia) Kyle Adnam (2015–2018)
- (Nigeria) / (Canada) Caleb Agada (2021–2022)
- (Australia) David Andersen (2016–2018, 2021)
- (Australia) Chris Anstey (1994, 2005–2010)
- (Japan) Yudai Baba (2020–2021, 2022)
- (Australia) David Barlow (2007–2009, 2014–2023)
- (Australia) Todd Blanchfield (2015–2017)
- (United States) Josh Boone (2016–2019)
- (Australia) Mark Bradtke (1993–1996, 1997–2005)
- (United States) Kevin Braswell (2012–2013)
- (Australia) Matt Burston (2010–2013)
- (United States) / (Australia) Lanard Copeland (1992–2005)
- (Australia) / (United Kingdom) Daryl Corletto (2001–2011, 2014–2015)
- (Australia) Nathan Crosswell (1999–2002, 2007–2010)
- (United States) Bennett Davison (1999–2000)
- (Australia) Matthew Dellavedova (2021–2022)
- (United States) Stephen Dennis (2014–2015)
- (United States) / (Nigeria) Ebi Ere (2008–2009)
- (United States) Carrick Felix (2017–2018)
- (United States) Jonny Flynn (2012–2013)
- (Australia) Andrew Gaze (1984–2005)
- (Australia) Warrick Giddey (1989–2002)
- (United States) / (Australia) Brian Goorjian (1984–1985)
- (Australia) Ray Gordon (1984–1986, 1989–1999)
- (Australia) Chris Goulding (2012–2014, 2015–present)
- (Australia) Tommy Greer (2005–2014)
- (Australia) Stephen Hoare (2000–2009)
- (United States) / (Antigua and Barbuda) Julius Hodge (2009–2010)
- (United States) Scotty Hopson (2020–2021)
- (United States) Stephen Holt (2015–2016)
- (Germany) / (Togo) Ariel Hukporti (2021–2024)
- (New Zealand) Shea Ili (2019–present)
- (Australia) Daniel Johnson (2008–2010)
- (United States) D. J. Kennedy (2018–2019)
- (Australia) Daniel Kickert (2014–2016)
- (United States) Stanton Kidd (2019–2020)
- (United States) Sean Lampley (2007–2008)
- (Australia) Jock Landale (2020–2021)
- (United States) Shawn Long (2019–2020)
- (South Sudan) / (Australia) Jo Lual-Acuil (2019–2022, 2023–2024)
- (Australia) Sam Mackinnon (2008–2010)
- (South Sudan) / (Australia) Majok Majok (2015–2018)
- (Australia) Mitch McCarron (2018–2021)
- (United States) / (Australia) Darryl McDonald (2003–2008)
- (United States) Jordan McRae (2014–2015)
- (Australia) Patty Mills (2011)
- (Australia) Neil Mottram (2002–2006)
- (Estonia) Martin Müürsepp (2007)
- (Australia) Luke Nevill (2010–2011)
- (Australia) Brad Newley (2021–2024)
- (New Zealand) Alex Pledger (2018–2020)
- (United States) Casey Prather (2017–2018, 2019–2020)
- (United States) / (New Zealand) Dion Prewster (2021–2022)
- (Australia) Robert Sibley (1992–1993)
- (United States) / (Australia) David Simmons (1989–1996)
- (New Zealand) Tohi Smith-Milner (2015–2020)
- (United States) Paul Stanley (1986)
- (Australia) David Stiff (2004–2008)
- (Canada) Dave Thomas (2003–2008, 2008–2009)
- (United States) Marcus Timmons (1997–1999, 2002–2003)
- (Australia) Nate Tomlinson (2012–2017)
- (Australia) Cameron Tragardh (2010–2012)
- (United States) Melo Trimble (2019–2020)
- (United States) Rashad Tucker (2004–2007)
- (United States) / (Nigeria) Ayinde Ubaka (2011–2012, 2013)
- (Australia) Lucas Walker (2010–2015)
- (United States) Casper Ware (2016–2019)
- (United States) Hakim Warrick (2015–2016)
- (Guam) / (United States) Tai Wesley (2016–2018)
- (Australia) Jack White (2020–2022)
- (United States) / (Jamaica) Corey Williams (2010–2011)
- (Australia) Mark Worthington (2009–2010, 2013–2015)

== Preseason games against NBA teams ==
ESPN

8 October 2017
14:00

boxscore

(Australia) Melbourne United	85–86	(United States) Oklahoma City Thunder
Scoring by quarter: 30–27, 14–22, 22–21, 19–16
Pts: Ware 20; Rebs: Prather 10; Asts: Wesley 5		Pts: George 22; Rebs: Adams 10; Asts: Westbrook 7

Chesapeake Energy Arena, Oklahoma City, United States
Attendance: not available
Referees: James Capers, Eric Dalen, Lauren Holtkamp

ESPN

28 September 2018
19:00

boxscore

(Australia) Melbourne United	84–104	(United States) Philadelphia 76ers
Scoring by quarter: 21–34, 21–22, 22–25, 20–23
Pts: Pledger, Ware 19; Rebs: Pledger 13; Asts: Ware 5		Pts: Embiid 20; Rebs: Embiid 10; Asts: Simmons 14

Wells Fargo Center, Philadelphia, United States
Attendance: 20,318
Referees: Ed Malloy, Mark Lindsay, Aaron Smith

ESPN2

5 October 2018
19:00

boxscore

(Australia) Melbourne United	82–120	(Canada) Toronto Raptors
Scoring by quarter: 17–23, 22–34, 19–44, 24–19
Pts: Goulding, Ware 17; Rebs: Boone 11; Asts: Ware 5		Pts: Powell 21; Rebs: Ibaka 12; Asts: Wright 5

Scotiabank Arena, Toronto, Canada
Attendance: 15,781
Referees: Matt Boland, Eric Dalen, Sean Corbin

SBS on Demand

13 October 2019
12:30

boxscore
report

(Australia) Melbourne United	100–118	(United States) Los Angeles Clippers
Scoring by quarter: 24–18, 27–29, 20–43, 29–28
Pts: Trimble 22; Rebs: Long 9 Asts: Trimble 6		Pts: Harrell 22; Rebs: Zubac 8 Asts: Williams 7

STAPLES Center, Los Angeles, United States
Attendance: 10,181
Referees: Brandon Adair, Tre Maddox, Bill Spooner

SBS on Demand

16 October 2019
19:00

boxscore
report

(Australia) Melbourne United	110–124	(United States) Sacramento Kings
Scoring by quarter: 28–31, 21–29, 23–39, 38–25
Pts: Goulding 25; Rebs: Long 15; Asts: Trimble 6		Pts: Bagley III 30; Rebs: Bagley III 14; Asts: Ferrell, Hield 6

Golden 1 Center, Sacramento, United States
Attendance: 10,534
Referees: J.T. Orr, CJ Washington, Sean Wright
