= Lanard Copeland =

American basketball player (born 1965)

Personal information
- Born: July 26, 1965 (age 61) Atlanta, Georgia, U.S.
- Listed height: 198 cm (6 ft 6 in)
- Listed weight: 88 kg (194 lb)

Career information
- High school: Washington (Atlanta, Georgia)
- College: Georgia State (1985–1989)
- NBA draft: 1989: undrafted
- Playing career: 1989–2008
- Position: Shooting guard / small forward
- Number: 7, 21
- Coaching career: 2014–present

Career history

Playing
- 1989–1990: Philadelphia 76ers
- 1990: Tulsa Fast Breakers
- 1990–1991: Rapid City Thrillers
- 1991: Atlanta Trojans
- 1991: Pepsi Hotshots
- 1991: Los Angeles Clippers
- 1992–2005: Melbourne Tigers
- 1992–1993: Capital Region Pontiacs
- 2005–2006: Brisbane Bullets
- 2006–2008: Adelaide 36ers

Coaching
- 2014–2016: Hume City Broncos
- 2016–2019: Sydney Kings (assistant)
- 2020–2021: Altona Gators

Career highlights
- 2× NBL champion (1993, 1997); NBL Grand Final MVP (1997); 5× NBL All Star (1992–1996, 2004); 2× All-NBL First Team (1999, 2002); All-NBL Second Team (1992); 2× All-NBL Third Team (1996, 2000); No. 21 retired by Melbourne Tigers
- Stats at NBA.com
- Stats at Basketball Reference

Lanard Copeland (born July 26, 1965) is an American-Australian professional basketball coach and former player. Born in Atlanta, Georgia, he played in the National Basketball League (NBL) from 1992 to 2008.

== Playing career ==
=== Early years ===
Copeland played four years of college basketball for Georgia State before going undrafted in the 1989 NBA draft. He later signed as a free agent with the Philadelphia 76ers out of the Southern California Summer Pro League. He played in 23 games for the 76ers as a rookie in 1989–90, averaging 3.2 points per game.

For the 1990–91 season, Copeland joined the Tulsa Fast Breakers of the Continental Basketball Association (CBA). However, on December 3, 1990, he was traded to the Rapid City Thrillers. Following the conclusion of the 1990–91 CBA season, he joined the Atlanta Trojans of the United States Basketball League. Copeland later went overseas to the Philippines to play for the Pepsi Hotshots.

On August 30, 1991, Copeland signed with the Los Angeles Clippers. His stint with the Clippers lasted just three months as he was waived by the team on December 3, 1991. Copeland returned to the CBA in December 1992, signing with the Capital Region Pontiacs.

=== NBL ===
In 1992, Copeland moved to Australia where he joined the Melbourne Tigers, a team he remained with until 2005. During his time with the Tigers, Copeland played 449 games over 14 seasons, recording 9,862 points, 1,763 rebounds, 1,438 assists and 233 blocked shots. He won league championships in 1993 and 1997, and was named the NBL Grand Final MVP in 1997. He was also a member of the All-NBL First Team in 1999 and 2002.

Copeland departed the Tigers following the 2004–05 NBL season and joined the Brisbane Bullets for the 2005–06 season. He played just one season for Brisbane before joining the Adelaide 36ers for the 2006–07 season. He played two seasons for Adelaide, retiring from the NBL following the 2007–08 NBL season. In 532 career NBL games over 17 seasons, Copeland averaged 20.2 points, 3.7 rebounds and 3.0 assists per game. His 10,735 points are ranked fourth all-time in NBL history.

== Coaching career ==
After retiring as a player, Copeland had a year coaching the Geelong Big V Division One Men's team. He joined the Hume City Broncos in the Big V as head coach in 2014. He continued to coach the Broncos up until 2016. He was also head coach of the Haileybury College men's team which won the Victorian High School championship in 2014.

On 6 April 2016, Copeland was named an assistant coach of the Sydney Kings, appointed alongside Dean Vickerman to serve under newly appointed head coach Andrew Gaze, Copeland's long-time teammate at the Melbourne Tigers. Copeland left the Kings when Gaze stepped down as coach after the 2018–19 NBL season.

Copeland joined the Altona Gators of the Big V Division Two as men's head coach for the 2020 season. He left the program following a disrupted 2021 season.

== Career statistics ==
Legend
GP	Games played	GS	Games started	MPG	Minutes per game
FG%	Field goal percentage	3P%	3-point field goal percentage	FT%	Free throw percentage
RPG	Rebounds per game	APG	Assists per game	SPG	Steals per game
BPG	Blocks per game	PPG	Points per game	**Bold**	Career high

=== NBA ===
==== Regular season ====
Year	Team	GP	GS	MPG	FG%	3P%	FT%	RPG	APG	SPG	BPG	PPG
1989–90	Philadelphia	**23**	0	**4.8**	**.456**	**.200**	.786	.4	.4	.0	.0	**3.2**
1991–92	L.A. Clippers	10	0	**4.8**	.304	.000	**1.000**	**.7**	**.5**	**.2**	.0	1.6
Career		33	0	4.8	.418	.143	.813	.5	.4	.1	.0	2.7

=== NBL ===
Games:	532
Points:	10,735 (20.2)
Rebounds:	3.7 rpg
Assists:	3.0 apg
Steals:	1.2 spg
Blocks:	0.5 bpg
Field Goals:	4078/9373 (44%)
3-Pointers:	1242/3569 (35%)
Free Throws:	1337/1664 (80%)
