= Ray Gordon =

Australian basketball player

Personal information
- Born: 1965 (age 59–60)
- Listed height: 190 cm (6 ft 3 in)

Career information
- Playing career: 1984–1999
- Position: Guard

Career history
- 1984–1986: Melbourne Tigers
- 1987–1988: North Melbourne Giants
- 1989–1999: Melbourne Tigers

Career highlights and awards
- 2× NBL champion (1993, 1997)

Ray Gordon (born 1965) is an Australian former basketball player who played 16 seasons in the National Basketball League (NBL). He played 14 seasons over two stints with the Melbourne Tigers and was a member of the Tigers' NBL championship teams in 1993 and 1997.

Gordon played 424 NBL games, with 380 of them being with the Melbourne Tigers. He played two seasons with the North Melbourne Giants in 1987 and 1988.

His No. 8 jersey was retired by the Tigers. He appeared in 14 grand final games.
