= Hakeem Kashama =

Canadian and American football player (born 1978)

Nicolas "Hakeem" Kashama
Profile
- Position: DE

Personal information
- Born: February 22, 1978 (age 48); Zaire
- Listed height: 6 ft 4 in (1.93 m)
- Listed weight: 267 lb (121 kg)

Career information
- College: University of Connecticut
- CFL draft: 2004: undrafted

Career history
- 2004: Cleveland Browns*
- 2004–2005: Hamilton Tiger-Cats
- 2006: Winnipeg Blue Bombers*
- 2007–2008: Calgary Stampeders*
- * Offseason or practice squad member only
- Stats at CFL.ca (archive)

Nicolas "Hakeem" Kashama (born February 22, 1978) is a former professional gridiron football defensive end. He was signed by the Cleveland Browns as an undrafted free agent in 2004. He played college football for the Connecticut Huskies.

Kashama was also a member of the Hamilton Tiger-Cats, Winnipeg Blue Bombers and Calgary Stampeders.

His brothers Alain, Fernand, and Kalonji, as well as his cousin, Tim Biakabutuka all played professional football.

== Professional career ==
=== Cleveland Browns ===
Kashama went undrafted in the 2004 NFL draft and signed with the Cleveland Browns on May 19, 2004. He was released on June 2 before being re-signed on July 6. On July 21, he was released for the second and final time.

=== Hamilton Tiger-Cats ===
Kashama signed with the Hamilton Tiger-Cats on August 9, 2004. He played in two games with Hamilton in 2004, with his debut coming on August 19 against the Ottawa Renegades. He suffered a leg injury on Labour Day that forced him to miss the rest of the season. During his two years in Hamilton, Kashama played in ten games and recorded four tackles which were the only ones of his career.

=== Winnipeg Blue Bombers ===
Kashama signed with the Winnipeg Blue Bombers. During the Blue Bombers 2006 training camp, he was noted for his hard hits on offensive players. He was released by Winnipeg on June 10, 2006.

=== Calgary Stampeders ===
He originally signed with the Calgary Stampeders during the 2007 offseason before being released after training camp. On June 1, 2008, Kashama re-signed with Calgary and was a final cut on June 22, 2008.

== Personal ==
Kashama is the brother of current Stampeders players Alain and Fernand Kashama. His cousin is also ex-National Football League running back Tim Biakabutuka.
