= Jarvis Lang =

American basketball player

Personal information
- Born: June 25, 1971 (age 55) Greenville, North Carolina, U.S.
- Listed height: 6 ft 7 in (2.01 m)
- Listed weight: 240 lb (109 kg)

Career information
- High school: Farmville Central (Farmville, North Carolina)
- College: Charlotte (1990–1995)
- NBA draft: 1995: undrafted
- Playing career: 1995–1998
- Position: Power forward

Career history
- 1995–1996: Banco di Sardegna Sassari
- 1996: Florida/Bradenton Sharks
- 1996–1997: La Crosse Bobcats
- 1998: Honka Espoo

Career highlights
- Australia NBL champion (1997); Metro Conference Player of the Year (1995); No. 23 retired by Charlotte 49ers

Jarvis Christopher Lang (born June 25, 1971) is an American former professional basketball player. A 6 ft 7 in (2.01 m) power forward, Lang had a lauded collegiate career at the University of North Carolina at Charlotte between 1990–91 and 1994–95 prior to playing professionally overseas. He was known as a rugged player who was difficult to contain in the low post offensively while providing a stiff challenge defensively.

== College ==
As a freshman for the Charlotte 49ers, Lang led all NCAA Division I freshmen in both scoring (19.6) and rebounding (10.6) per game. He was named the Metro Conference Freshman of the Year and named to the All-Metro Freshman Team, and ESPN named him to the All-American First Team for freshmen only. Lang's sophomore season, however, saw him go down in just the second game with an injury, forcing him to medical redshirt to sit out the entire year. He returned in 1992–93 but averaged a reduced 13.6 points and 7.4 rebounds per game, yet still was named to the All-Metro Second Team. During his junior season, his averages increased to 16.7 points and 10.3 rebounds as he was named to the All-Metro First Team. Numerous media outlets named him as an honorable mention All-American as well. Then, for his senior season in 1994–95, Lang repeated as a first-team all-conference performer. His 16.4 points, 8.9 rebounds and 1.0 steals and blocks per game made him the Metro Conference Player of the Year, which was coincidentally the final year in the award's existence due to the conference joining with the Great Midwest Conference, forming Conference USA.

Lang finished his college career with 1,855 points and 1,047 rebounds. Through 2011–12, those totals place him fifth and second all-time in school history. His jersey (number 23) has been retired by Charlotte.

== Professional and later life ==
Lang did not get taken in the 1995 NBA draft but he did carve out a professional career overseas, including stints in Italy and Switzerland. Today he resides in the Charlotte, North Carolina area, working non-basketball related jobs.
