= Alain Kashama =

Congolese gridiron football player (born 1979)

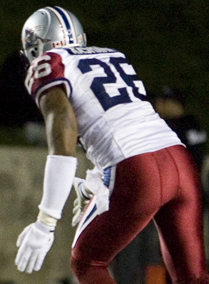
- Kashama in 2007

No. 97
- Position: Defensive end

Personal information
- Born: December 8, 1979 (age 46); Zaire
- Listed height: 6 ft 4 in (1.93 m)
- Listed weight: 270 lb (122 kg)

Career information
- High school: Bramalea Secondary School, Brampton
- College: Michigan
- CFL draft: 2004: 1st round, 8th overall pick

Career history
- 2004: Chicago Bears
- 2005: Seattle Seahawks
- 2006: Cologne Centurions
- 2006–2008: Montreal Alouettes
- 2008: Hamilton Tiger-Cats
- 2009: Calgary Stampeders
- Stats at Pro Football Reference
- Stats at CFL.ca

Alain Kaleta Olony T. Kashama (born December 8, 1979) is a Canadian former professional football defensive end who played in the National Football League (NFL) and Canadian Football League (CFL). He was signed by the Chicago Bears as an undrafted free agent in 2004. He played college football for the Michigan Wolverines.

Kashama also played for the Seattle Seahawks, Cologne Centurions, Montreal Alouettes, Hamilton Tiger-Cats, and Calgary Stampeders.

== Early life ==
Kashama was born in Zaire before moving to Brampton, Ontario and then Montreal, Quebec as a child. Because of this move, Kashama is fluent in French. He played high school football at Vieux Montreal, and recorded over 200 tackles and 50 sacks while being ranked as the second best prep player in Canada. During high school, Kashama also played basketball and ran track.

Kashama attended the University of Michigan, where he majored in African-American studies. He played in 40 games, starting six for the Wolverines football team. Kashama recorded a total of 48 tackles and six sacks. During his first three years at Michigan, Kashama was mainly a backup defensive end playing in pass rushing downs and when others were injured. However, after Shantee Orr declared for the 2003 NFL draft, Kashama was expected to start as a senior.

== Career ==
=== Chicago Bears ===
After going undrafted in the 2004 NFL draft, Kashama signed with the Chicago Bears on April 26, 2004. After his signing, the Bears were reportedly starting to, "envision ways in which Kashama could contribute if he keeps improving at his current rate." He played in three games for Chicago before being traded to the Seattle Seahawks.

=== Seattle Seahawks ===
After being traded to the Seahawks, Kashama played in one game with Seattle during the 2005 season. He was allocated to NFL Europe in 2006 and played for the Cologne Centurions during the 2006 season. The Seahawks released him on July 31, 2006.

=== Montreal Alouettes ===
Kashama was drafted by the Montreal Alouettes in the 2004 CFL draft but opted to sign with the NFL's Chicago Bears. In 2007, Kashama led Montreal in sacks with eight. Kashama also recorded 29 tackles for the Alouettes. On July 21, 2008, it was reported by The Montreal Gazette that Kashama was to be traded after suffering a knee injury. Jim Popp, the Alouettes general manager shot down the rumors of a possible trade although he did not deny that teams such as the Calgary Stampeders and Edmonton Eskimos were calling.

=== Hamilton Tiger-Cats ===
Kashama was traded to the Hamilton Tiger-Cats on September 10, 2008, for a conditional pick in the 2009 CFL draft. With Hamilton he recorded five tackles and one sack.

=== Calgary Stampeders ===
On February 24, 2009, Kashama signed with the Calgary Stampeders.

== Personal life ==
Kashama's brother Fernand is his teammate with Calgary while his cousin Tim Biakabutuka was a running back for the Carolina Panthers. His brother Hakeem also played professional football with the Hamilton Tiger-Cats. He credits his cousin for getting him interested in football and said that, "I started to play football after he was drafted in 1996." Kashama is nicknamed "Sackmaster" by his teammates.
