= Fernand Kashama =

Congolese gridiron football player (born 1985)

No. 56
- Positions: Defensive lineman, Fullback, Linebacker

Personal information
- Born: February 24, 1985 (age 41); Kinshasa, Zaire
- Listed height: 6 ft 3 in (1.91 m)
- Listed weight: 221 lb (100 kg)

Career information
- High school: Notre Dame (Brampton, Ontario, Canada)
- College: Western Michigan (2004–2007)
- CFL draft: 2008: 2nd round, 16th overall pick

Career history
- 2009: Calgary Stampeders
- 2010–2012: Winnipeg Blue Bombers
- Stats at CFL.ca

Fernand Kashama (born February 26, 1985) is a former Canadian football defensive lineman who played in the Canadian Football League (CFL). He was drafted by the Calgary Stampeders in the second round of the 2008 CFL draft. He played college football for the Western Michigan Broncos. He also played for the Winnipeg Blue Bombers.

== Early life ==
Kashama was born on February 26, 1985, in Kinshasa, Zaire and grew up in Brampton, Ontario. During his senior season in high school, he played both wide receiver and free safety. He recorded 30 catches for 700 receiving yards.

== College career ==
Kashama was recruited by Boise State, Marshall, Rutgers and Western Michigan, before eventually choosing the latter. He enrolled at the university in January 2004. He redshirted in his true freshman season in 2004. During his redshirt freshman season in 2005, he started off on the offensive scout team before being activated. After playing at tight end for Western Michigan in 2005 and 2006, he converted to defensive lineman in 2007. In his first season at the position he played in all 12 games and recorded his first career sack against Temple on November 24. Overall in his junior and senior seasons which were spent playing on the defensive line, he had 14 tackles along with the one sack.

== Professional career ==
Kashama was selected by the Calgary Stampeders in the 2008 CFL draft with the 16th overall pick. He returned to Western Michigan in 2008 for his senior season before signing with Calgary on May 8, 2009. Kashama was originally listed as a linebacker when he joined Calgary but converted to fullback for the season.

On October 8, 2010, Kashama signed as a free agent with the Winnipeg Blue Bombers for the remainder of the 2010 season.

== Personal ==
Kashama's older brother Alain, also played for the Stampeders. His other brother Hakeem played for three CFL teams and his cousin Tim Biakabutuka played for the NFL's Carolina Panthers. Kashama also has a younger brother Bronley who attended Eastern Michigan University.
