= 1988 NBL Finals =

- League: National Basketball League
- Sport: Basketball
- Duration: 14 July - 7 August 1988
- Teams: 6
- TV partner: Seven Network

NBL Finals
- Champions: Canberra Cannons
- Runners-up: North Melbourne Giants
- Finals MVP: Phil Smyth

Seasons
- 1987 1989

The 1988 NBL Finals was the championship series of the 1988 season of Australia's National Basketball League (NBL) and the conclusion of the season's playoffs. The Canberra Cannons defeated the North Melbourne Giants in three games (2-1) for their third NBL championship.

== Format ==
The 1988 National Basketball League Finals started on 14 July and concluded on 7 August. The playoffs consisted of two knockout Quarter finals, two best of three Semi-finals and the best of three game Grand Final series. As the two top teams at the end of the regular season, the Adelaide 36ers and North Melbourne Giants both qualified for home court advantage during the Semi-finals.

The finals series were played earlier than usual due to the 1988 Summer Olympic Games which were held at the time the NBL normally held their finals (September–October).

== Qualification ==
=== Qualified teams ===
Team	Finals appearance	Previous appearance	Previous best performance
Adelaide 36ers	5th	1987	Champions (1986)
North Melbourne Giants	1st	-	6th in 1987
Canberra Cannons	7th	1987	Champions (1983, 1984)
Brisbane Bullets	7th	1987	Champions (1985, 1987)
Perth Wildcats	2nd	1987	Runner up (1987)
Newcastle Falcons	4th	1987	4th in 1984 and 1985

=== Ladder ===
Pos	1988 NBL season											
Pos	Team	Pld	W	L	PCT	Last 5	Streak	Home	Away	PF	PA	PP
1	Adelaide 36ers	24	19	5	79.17%	4–1	W2	11–1	8–4	2744	2400	114.33%
2	North Melbourne Giants^{1}	24	18	6	75.00%	4–1	W3	9–3	9–3	2903	2697	107.64%
3	Brisbane Bullets^{1}	24	18	6	75.00%	3–2	W1	9–3	9–3	2603	2423	107.43%
4	Canberra Cannons	24	16	8	66.67%	5–0	W7	9–3	7–5	2691	2515	107.00%
5	Newcastle Falcons^{2}	24	13	11	54.17%	3–2	L1	8–4	5–7	2850	2832	100.64%
6	Perth Wildcats^{2}	24	13	11	54.17%	3–2	W1	9–3	4–8	2653	2573	103.11%
7	Illawarra Hawks^{3}	24	11	13	45.83%	1–4	L2	6–6	5–7	2455	2410	101.87%
8	Eastside Spectres^{3}	24	11	13	45.83%	3–2	W2	7–5	4–8	2495	2500	99.80%
9	Hobart Tassie Devils^{4}	24	10	14	41.67%	1–4	L4	7–5	3–9	2298	2414	95.19%
10	Sydney Kings^{4}	24	10	14	41.67%	2–3	L2	7–5	3–9	2460	2554	96.32%
11	Westside Saints	24	9	15	37.50%	1–4	W1	6–6	3–9	2534	2589	97.88%
12	Melbourne Tigers	24	8	16	33.33%	2–3	L1	4–8	4–8	2562	2681	95.56%
13	Geelong Supercats	24	0	24	00.00%	0–5	L24	0–12	0–12	2298	2958	77.69%

Updated to match(es) played on 9 July 1988. Source: NBL.com.au

== Playoff bracket ==
Elimination Finals
4	Canberra Cannons	107
5	Newcastle Falcons	92
3	Brisbane Bullets	98
6	Perth Wildcats	113

Semifinals
1	Adelaide 36ers	91	95	X
4	Canberra Cannons	100	100	X
2	North Melbourne Giants	105	137	134
6	Perth Wildcats	108	113	111

Grand Final
2	North Melbourne Giants	95	117	101
4	Canberra Cannons	120	101	108

== Elimination Finals ==
=== (3) Canberra Cannons vs (6) Newcastle Falcons ===
Seven Network

14 July

boxscore

Canberra Cannons 107, Newcastle Falcons 92
Scoring by quarter: 24-16, 23-33, 30-23, 30-20
Pts: Simon Cottrell 23; Rebs: Willie Simmons 23; Asts: Phil Smyth 7	Pts: Wayne Mcdaniel 37; Rebs: Jerry Everett 19; Asts: Jerry Everett 2

AIS Arena, Canberra
Referees: Bill Mildenhall, Robert Barnett

=== (4) Brisbane Bullets vs (5) Perth Wildcats ===
Seven Network

16 July

boxscore

Brisbane Bullets 98, Perth Wildcats 113
Scoring by quarter: 26-27, 26-28, 23-27, 31-23
Pts: Leroy Loggins 31; Rebs: Leroy Loggins 11; Asts: Leroy Loggins 8	Pts: Cal Bruton 31; Rebs: Kendal Pinder 21; Asts: Mike Ellis 4

Brisbane Entertainment Centre
Referees: Ray Hunt, Geoff Weeks

== Semifinals ==
=== (1) Adelaide 36ers vs (3) Canberra Cannons ===
==== Game 1 ====
Seven Network

19 July

boxscore

Canberra Cannons 100, Adelaide 36ers 91
Scoring by quarter: 19-26, 37-21, 27-17, 17-27
Pts: Tad Dufelmeier 23; Rebs: Willie Simmons 11; Asts: Smyth, McEachin 4 each	Pts: Mark Davis 27; Rebs: Mark Davis 15; Asts: Darryl Pearce 4
Canberra lead the series 1-0

AIS Arena, Canberra
Attendance: 5,200
Referees: Ray Hunt, Robert Barnett

=== Game 2 ===
Seven Network

22 July

boxscore

Adelaide 36ers 95, Canberra Cannons 100
Scoring by quarter: 21-23, 33-29, 18-27, 23-21
Pts: Mark Davis 26; Rebs: Mark Davis 20; Asts: Al Green 5	Pts: Phil Smyth 28; Rebs: Willie Simmons 17; Asts: Phil Smyth 6
Canberra win the series 2-0

Apollo Stadium, Adelaide
Attendance: 3,000
Referees: Eddie Crouch, Bill Mildenhall

=== Game 1 ===
Seven Network

20 July

boxscore

Perth Wildcats 108, North Melbourne Giants 105
Scoring by quarter: 35-32, 28-31, 29-22, 16-20
Pts: Kendal Pinder 25; Rebs: James Crawford 15; Asts: Cal Bruton 6	Pts: Fisher, Dillon 26 each Rebs: Fisher, Leader 11 each Asts: Leader, Graham 4 each
Perth lead the series 1-0

Perth Superdrome
Attendance: 4,500
Referees: Eddie Crouch, Geoff Weeks

=== Game 2 ===
Seven Network

22 July

boxscore

North Melbourne Giants 137, Perth Wildcats 113
Scoring by quarter: 27-26, 26-28, 40-27, 44-32
Pts: Tim Dillon 44; Rebs: Tim Dillon 15; Asts: Dillon, Fisher 7 each	Pts: Kendal Pinder 23; Rebs: Paul Kuiper 10; Asts: Cal Bruton 4
Series tied at 1-1

The Glass House, Melbourne
Attendance: 7,200
Referees: Ray Hunt, Geoff Weeks

=== Game 3 ===
Seven Network

24 July

boxscore

North Melbourne Giants 134, Perth Wildcats 111
Scoring by quarter: 31-29, 33-21, 24-37, 46-24
Pts: Tim Dillon 44; Rebs: Tim Dillon 9 Asts: Wayne Carroll 10	Pts: Kendal Pinder 40; Rebs: Kendal Pinder 17; Asts: Mike Ellis 10
North Melbourne win the series 2-1

The Glass House, Melbourne
Attendance: 7,200
Referees: Ray Hunt, Eddie Crouch

== Grand Final series ==
=== (2) North Melbourne Giants vs (3) Canberra Cannons ===
==== Game 1 ====
Seven Network

30 July

boxscore

Canberra Cannons 120, North Melbourne Giants 95
Scoring by quarter: 30-25, 25-24, 37-22, 28-24
Pts: Phil Smyth 25; Rebs: Willie Simmons 12; Asts: Phil Smyth 8	Pts: Tim Dillon 29; Rebs: Tim Dillon 16; Asts: Wayne Carroll, Fisher 3 each
Canberra leads series 1-0

AIS Arena, Canberra
Attendance: 5,200
Referees: Ray Hunt, Bill Mildenhall

==== Game 2 ====
Seven Network

5 August

boxscore

North Melbourne Giants 117, Canberra Cannons 101
Scoring by quarter: 33-32, 29-11, 34-28, 30-21
Pts: Tim Dillon 43; Rebs: Tim Dillon 11; Asts: Wayne Carroll 7	Pts: Jamie Kennedy 27; Rebs: Willie Simmons 13; Asts: Phil Smyth 7
Series tied at 1-1

The Glass House, Melbourne
Attendance: 7,200
Referees: Eddie Crouch, Geoff Weeks

==== Game 3 ====
Seven Network

7 August

boxscore

North Melbourne Giants 101, Canberra Cannons 108
Scoring by quarter: 24-26, 23-26, 28-25, 26-31
Pts: David Graham 28; Rebs: Tim Dillon 10; Asts: Wayne Carroll 6	Pts: Willie Simmons 23; Rebs: Willie Simmons 10; Asts: Herb McEachin 6
Canberra wins series and NBL Championship, 2–1; Grand Final MVP: Phil Smyth (Canberra)

The Glass House, Melbourne
Attendance: 7,200
Referees: Eddie Crouch, Bill Mildenhall

== See also ==
- 1988 NBL season
