= Have mercy =

Have Mercy may refer to:

- Have Mercy (album), an album by the Mooney Suzuki
- Have Mercy! (Michael Hill's Blues Mob album), an album by Michael Hill's Blues Mob
- "Have Mercy" (Chlöe song), a song by Chlöe
- "Have Mercy" (The Judds song), a song by the Judds
- "Have Mercy" (YBN Cordae song), a song by YBN Cordae
- "Have Mercy", an alternate title of "Mercy, Mercy" (Don Covay song)
- "Have Mercy", a song by Loretta Lynn from her 2004 album, Van Lear Rose
- "Have Mercy", a song by Thunder from their 2008 album, Bang!
- "Have Mercy", a catchphrase by Jesse Katsopolis on Full House
- Have Mercy: His Complete Chess Recordings, 1969-1974, an album by Chuck Berry
- Have Mercy, a 2009 mixtape by Curtis Santiago
- Have Mercy, a 1995 autobiography by Wolfman Jack
- Have Mercy (band), a rock band from Baltimore, Maryland

== See also ==
- Lord Have Mercy (disambiguation)
- Mercy (disambiguation)
