= 1987 NBL Finals =

- League: National Basketball League
- Sport: Basketball
- Duration: 30 September - 16 October 1987
- Teams: 4
- TV partner(s): ATN7, BTQ7, STW9, SAS10

NBL Finals
- Champions: Brisbane Bullets
- Runners-up: Perth Wildcats
- Finals MVP: Leroy Loggins

Seasons
- 1986 1988

The 1987 NBL Finals was the championship series of the 1987 season of Australia's National Basketball League (NBL) and the conclusion of the season's playoffs. The Brisbane Bullets defeated the Perth Wildcats in two games (2-0) for their second NBL championship.

== Format ==
The 1987 National Basketball League Finals started on 30 September and concluded on 16 October. The playoffs consisted of two best of three Semi-finals and the best of three game Grand Final series.

== Qualification ==
=== Qualified teams ===
Team	Finals appearance	Previous appearance	Previous best performance
Brisbane Bullets	6th	1986	Runners up (1986)
Adelaide 36ers	4th	1986	Champions (1986)
Illawarra Hawks	3rd	1986	4th in 1986
Perth Wildcats	1st	-	8th in 1985

=== Ladder ===
Pos	1987 NBL season											
Pos	Team	Pld	W	L	PCT	Last 5	Streak	Home	Away	PF	PA	PP
1	Adelaide 36ers	26	21	5	80.77%	4–1	W2	11–2	10–3	3046	2677	113.78%
2	Brisbane Bullets^{1}	26	20	6	76.92%	5–0	W9	13–0	7–6	2711	2497	108.57%
3	Illawarra Hawks^{1}	26	20	6	76.92%	4–1	W4	13–0	7–6	2680	2528	106.01%
4	Perth Wildcats	26	19	7	73.08%	4–1	W4	11–2	8–5	3005	2756	109.03%
5	Canberra Cannons	26	17	9	65.38%	3–2	W1	10–3	7–6	2848	2770	102.82%
6	North Melbourne Giants	26	15	11	57.69%	2–3	W1	10–3	5–8	3060	2807	109.01%
7	Hobart Tassie Devils	26	14	12	53.85%	2–3	L3	8–5	6–7	2599	2568	101.21%
8	Eastside Spectres^{2}	26	13	13	50.00%	2–3	L1	6–7	7–6	2607	2596	100.42%
9	Geelong Cats^{2}	26	13	13	50.00%	3–2	L2	10–3	3–10	2644	2707	97.67%
10	Sydney Supersonics	26	9	17	34.62%	2–3	W1	5–8	4–9	2744	2861	95.91%
11	West Sydney Westars	26	8	18	30.77%	2–3	L2	4–9	4–9	2564	2695	95.14%
12	Newcastle Falcons	26	6	20	23.08%	3–2	W1	4–9	2–11	2948	3176	92.82%
13	Westside Saints	26	4	22	15.38%	0–5	L6	3–10	1–12	2673	2980	89.70%
14	Melbourne Tigers	26	3	23	11.54%	1–4	W1	3–10	0–13	2635	3146	83.76%

Updated to match(es) played on 20 September 1987. Source: NBL.com.au

The NBL tie-breaker system as outlined in the NBL Rules and Regulations states that in the case of an identical win–loss record, the results in games played between the teams will determine order of seeding.

== Playoff bracket ==
Elimination Finals
4	Perth Wildcats	101
5	Canberra Cannons	96
3	Illawarra Hawks	105
6	North Melbourne Giants	97

Semifinals
1	Adelaide 36ers	99	99	93
4	Perth Wildcats	98	101	103
2	Brisbane Bullets	109	77	100
3	Illawarra Hawks	87	78	82

Grand Final
2	Brisbane Bullets	80	106	X
4	Perth Wildcats	79	87	X

== Elimination Finals ==
Date	Home team	Score	Away team	Venue
26 September	Illawarra Hawks	105-97	North Melbourne Giants	Illawarra Basketball Stadium
27 September	Perth Wildcats	101-96	Canberra Cannons	Perth Superdrome

== Semifinals ==
=== (2) Brisbane Bullets vs (3) Illawarra Hawks ===
==== Game 1 ====
ATN7

30 September

boxscore

Illawarra Hawks 87, Brisbane Bullets 109
Scoring by quarter: 19-26, 16-32, 27-34, 25-17
Pts: Bateman, Borner 15 each Rebs: Jim Bateman 11; Asts: McLeod, Borner 4 each	Pts: Leroy Loggins 38; Rebs: Leroy Loggins 10; Asts: Ron Radliff 6

Illawarra Basketball Stadium
Attendance: 2,000
Referees: Ray Hunt, Geoff Weeks

==== Game 2 ====
BTQ7

2 October

boxscore

Brisbane Bullets 77, Illawarra Hawks 78
Scoring by quarter: 12-21, 22-18, 32-17, 11-22
Pts: Ron Radliff 15; Rebs: Larry Sengstock 11; Asts: Leroy Loggins 6	Pts: Jim Bateman 22; Rebs: Jim Bateman 14; Asts: Gordie McLeod 8

Brisbane Entertainment Centre
Referees: Eddie Crouch, Bill Mildenhall

==== Game 3 ====
BTQ7

4 October

boxscore

Brisbane Bullets 100, Illawarra Hawks 82
Scoring by quarter: 26-19, 20-21, 26-27, 28-15
Pts: Larry Sengstock 16; Rebs: Larry Sengstock 14; Asts: Darren Perry 5	Pts: Bateman, Borner 17 each Rebs: Jim Bateman 13; Asts: Gordie McLeod 6
Brisbane win the series 2-1

Brisbane Entertainment Centre
Referees: Eddie Crouch, Bill Mildenhall

=== (1) Adelaide 36ers vs (4) Perth Wildcats ===
==== Game 1 ====
STW9

30 September

boxscore

Perth Wildcats 98, Adelaide 36ers 99
Scoring by quarter: 23-30, 26-29, 23-24, 26-16
Pts: Pinder, Crawford 24 each Rebs: Kendal Pinder 16; Asts: Alan Black 9	Pts: Darryl Pearce 24; Rebs: Mark Davis 14; Asts: Darryl Pearce 6

Perth Superdrome
Attendance: 4,500
Referees: Eddie Crouch, Bill Mildenhall

==== Game 2 ====
SAS10

2 October

boxscore

Adelaide 36ers 99, Perth Wildcats 101
Scoring by quarter: 26-22, 22-26, 32-22, 19-31
Pts: Darryl Pearce 29; Rebs: Mark Davis 21; Asts: Al Green 4	Pts: James Crawford 40; Rebs: Kendal Pinder 13; Asts: Black, Bruton, Crawford 3 each

Apollo Stadium, Adelaide
Attendance: 3,000
Referees: Ray Hunt, Robert Barnett

==== Game 3 ====
SAS10

4 October

boxscore

Adelaide 36ers 93, Perth Wildcats 103
Scoring by quarter: 23-33, 27-23, 18-26, 25-21
Pts: Mark Davis 36; Rebs: Mark Davis 16; Asts: Jones, McKay 3 each	Pts: James Crawford 34; Rebs: James Crawford 13; Asts: Cal Bruton 4
Perth win the series 2-1

Apollo Stadium, Adelaide
Attendance: 3,000
Referees: Ray Hunt, Robert Barnett

== Grand Final series ==
=== (2) Brisbane Bullets vs (4) Perth Wildcats ===
==== Game 1 ====
STW9

10 October

boxscore

Perth Wildcats 79, Brisbane Bullets 80
Scoring by quarter: 25-23, 15-22, 21-19, 18-16
Pts: Kendal Pinder 27; Rebs: Kendal Pinder 15; Asts: Cal Bruton 6	Pts: Emery Atkinson 22; Rebs: Larry Sengstock 15; Asts: Sibley, Radliff 3 each
Brisbane leads series, 1–0

Perth Superdrome
Attendance: 4,500
Referees: Eddie Crouch, Bill Mildenhall

==== Game 2 ====
BTQ7

16 October

boxscore

Brisbane Bullets 106, Perth Wildcats 87
Scoring by quarter: 29-23, 18-21, 33-26, 26-17
Pts: Leroy Loggins 36; Rebs: John Dorge 10; Asts: Loggins, Perry 3 each	Pts: Kendal Pinder 25; Rebs: Kendal Pinder 15; Asts: Cal Bruton 6
Brisbane wins series and NBL Championship, 2–0; Grand Final MVP: Leroy Loggins (Brisbane)

Brisbane Entertainment Centre
Attendance: 11,000
Referees: Ray Hunt, Eddie Crouch

== See also ==
- 1987 NBL season
