= Mick Hill =

Mick Hill may refer to:

- Mick Hill (basketball) (born 1978), Australian basketballer
- Mick Hill (footballer) (1947–2008), former Welsh international footballer
- Mick Hill (javelin thrower) (born 1964), former British javelin thrower
- Mick Hill (pool player) (born 1980), British pool player and WEPF Men's Champion of 2004

== See also ==
- Mike Hill (disambiguation)
- Michael Hill (disambiguation)
