= Michael Hills =

Michael Hills may refer to:

- Michael Hills (jockey) (born 1963), British jockey
- Michael Hills (rugby union) (born 1985), rugby union player

== See also ==
- Michael Hill's Blues Mob, American blues trio
- Michael Hill (disambiguation)
