= Michael Hill =

Michael Hill may refer to:

- Michael Hill (bishop) (born 1949), Bishop of Bristol
- Michael Hill (1672–1699), MP in England and Ireland
- Michael Hill (diplomat), administrator of Ascension Island
- Michael Hill (entrepreneur) (1938–2025), New Zealand jeweller, businessman and philanthropist
- Michael Hill Jeweller, the company
- Michael Hill (activist) (born 1951), leader of the League of the South, a separatist organization in the Southern United States
- Michael Hill, leader of the American blues trio, Michael Hill's Blues Mob

== Sports ==
- Michael Hill (tennis) (born 1974), former tennis player winner of 3 ATP doubles titles
- Michael Hill (baseball) (born 1971), general manager of the Miami Marlins
- Michael Hill (cricketer, born 1945) (born 1945), Australian cricketer
- Michael Hill (cricketer, born 1988) (born 1988), Australian cricketer
- Michael Hill (English cricketer) (born 1951), retired English cricketer
- Michael Hill (American football) (born 1989), American football running back

== See also ==
- Michael Hills (disambiguation)
- Mike Hill (disambiguation)
- Mick Hill (disambiguation)
