= Eddy Groves =

Australian businessman

- Born: 16 June 1966 (age 60)
- Occupations: Founder, chief executive officer,
- Board member of: ABC Learning
- Spouse(s): Le Neve Groves (married 1985) divorced, late 1990s Viryan Collins-Rubie

Edmund Stuart "Eddy" Groves, born in Durban, South Africa in 1966, is an Australian businessman, founder and former chief executive officer of ABC Learning, once one of Australia's largest companies and one of the world's biggest childcare providers prior to going into administration. In January 2013 Groves was declared bankrupt.

== Early life ==
Eddy Groves was born in Durban, South Africa, to a soldier and a schoolteacher. The family returned to Canada in late 1966. A further relocation in July 1968 found the family on the West Coast, in Victoria, British Columbia. Groves had arrived in Australia by 1970 and settled in Queensland. He was educated at Padua College in Brisbane.

After leaving school, he enrolled at university to study for a business degree. He left halfway through, eager to engage in business rather than learning about it, and got his first job as a clerk with the ANZ bank. Later, he became a milkman for Paul's Milk in Brisbane. Armed with a loan from his wife's father, he bought a distributorship when he was nineteen years old, which was the start of his business career. He expanded his milk distribution business to the point where his company, Quantum Food Services, was the biggest distributor of milk in Queensland.

In 1985, at the age of nineteen, Groves married Le Neve, with whom he has two daughters. The couple split in the late 1990s, with his wife gaining custody of the children. She sued her former husband for "unjustly enriching himself" while he was in control of ABC. Groves left ABC with a multibillion-dollar debt, amidst allegations of poor financial management and related questionable financial dealings.

== ABC Developmental Learning Centres ==
In 1988, Groves and his subsequently estranged wife, Le Neve, opened a childcare centre in suburban Brisbane, having previously concluded that childcare was a universally "needed service" much like milk distribution. Run as a franchise model, their centres quickly became successful, expanded quickly, with bank finance from St George Bank of $20 million by 1993 and listing on the Australian Stock Exchange (ASX) in 2001. They both held a 14.9% share in the company worth $2.5 billion at its peak, making Eddy Groves one of Australia's richest people at the time, according to Business Review Weekly.

However, in February 2008, with the share price falling rapidly, both Groves and his wife had to sell their entire shareholdings in the company because of margin calls by banks who had lent against the value of the shares. The fall in the share price was caused by a 42 per cent fall in net profit, and rumours that the company was in default of its lending covenants.

Even though Groves stated to the ASX that ABC had complied with its financial obligations, there was concern that several directors had sold shares in the days leading up to the announcement, before the price fell, and that Groves had not fully revealed the effect that the stock losses would have on the business through the effect of margin calls by lending partners. At the end of February 2008, the ASX was reported to be watching activity closely.

Groves and his wife left the company in September 2008.

On 6 November 2008, ABC Learning Centres Ltd voluntarily appointed administrators for the ABC Group.

As of 10 November 2008, Groves and ABC were estimated to owe the main banks in excess of A$1 Billion with the Federal Government appointing a forensic accountant to go over the books, due to incorrect financial reporting. The Federal Government gave ABC childcare financial security to keep it operating to the end of December 2008.

The 1200-centre ABC network was eventually sold off. Most centres were sold in December 2009 to Goodstart Early Learning, a newly formed not-for-profit group created by a coalition of charitable organisations.

=== Legal issues ===
In January 2011, Groves was charged with "aiding an alleged dishonest use of position by fellow ABC Learning director Martin Kemp" in regards to the sale of three childcare centres to ABC Learning by Kemp. In June 2012, Kemp was found not guilty in the Brisbane District Court of charges of breaching his director's duties. As a consequence, Groves case was reviewed and in July 2012 the charges against Groves were "discontinued" by the Commonwealth Director of Public Prosecutions. However, the Australian Securities & Investments Commission (ASIC) continued to investigate the collapse of ABC Learning. Those criminal investigations were dropped in February 2016.

In late January 2013, Groves was declared bankrupt. That bankruptcy concluded in February 2016.

== Other assets ==
In 1999, Groves purchased the Brisbane Bullets basketball team that competes in the National Basketball League competition. He restructured the organisation, he injected funds and caused the team to be much more successful. The team made the finals in the 2003/4 season. He bought a stake in the Adelaide Arena in Adelaide in 2006 for $3.95 million, which houses the NBL team Adelaide 36ers.

In April 2008, Groves announced that he was putting the Bullets on the market to "focus all [his] attention on ABC". Although getting close to clinching a sale to another prominent Brisbane businessman at one stage, Groves failed to secure a buyer and the Brisbane Bullets folded later in the year.

Groves had investments in other companies outside ABC: such as ELMM (Eddy, Le Neve, Martin and his wife, Mary). ELMM in turn owned a significant stake, in Ezi Debit, which handled payments for many ABC parents.
