= Evan Thornley =

Australian politician

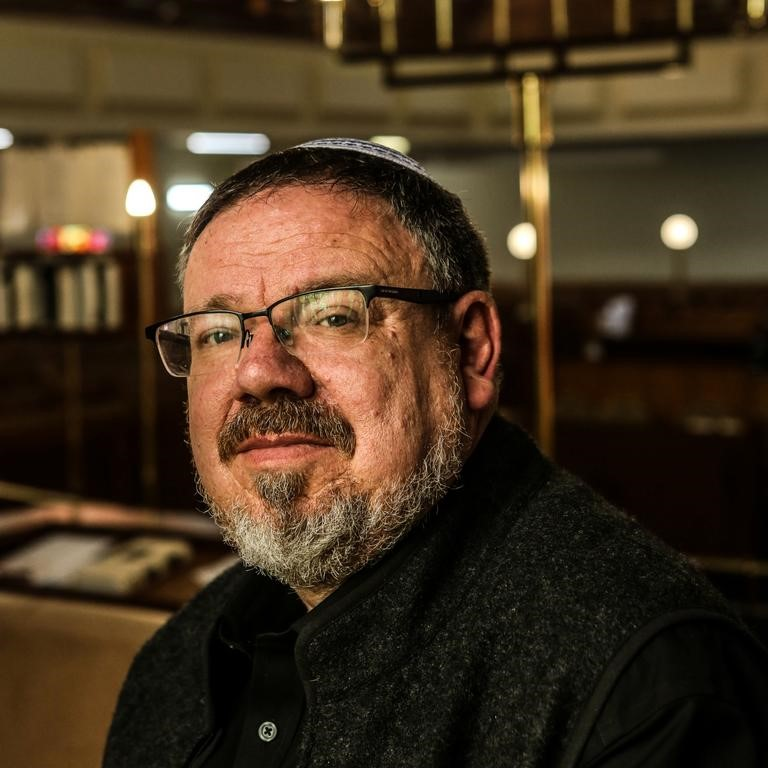
Thornley in 2024

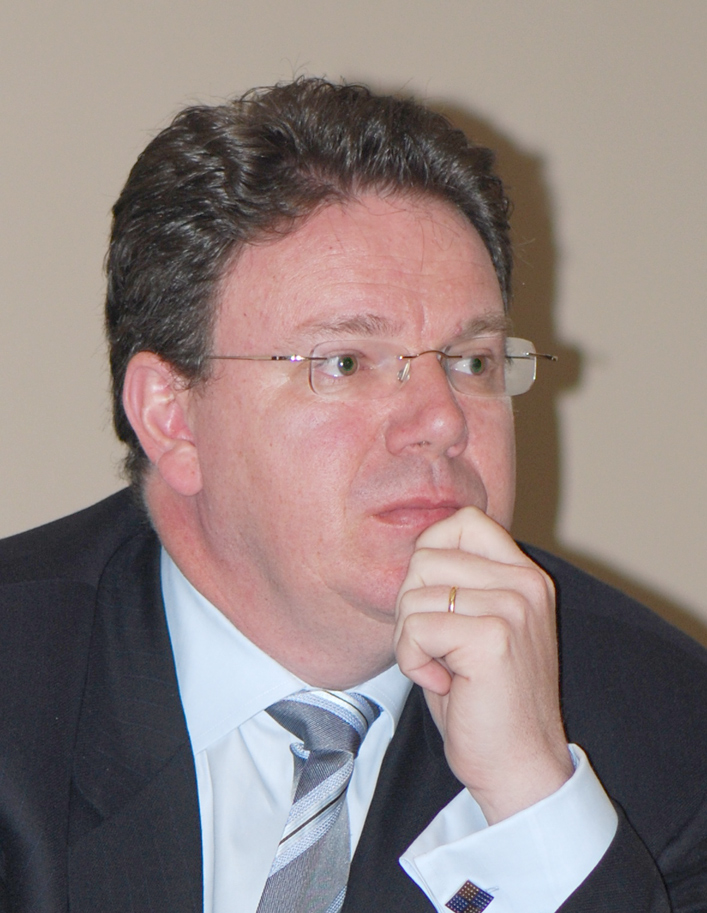
Thornley speaking at the True Cost Economics Forum, Melbourne Town Hall, 2007.

Thornley speaking at an Australian Labor Party gathering on the night of the 2006 state election, at which he was a candidate.

Evan William Thornley (born 1964), is an Australian social entrepreneur, philanthropist and impact investor. Thornley is the founder and executive chair of LongView, with a mission to find solutions to Australia's housing crisis.

"Based on his own childhood without secure housing, he became a passionate advocate for renters as well as bridging the affordability gap for Australians who don't come from money, and lack the benefit of the bank of mum and dad. LongView has grown to become a recognised industry leader in residential property buying and management and, through its Shared Equity Fund (a form of equity sharing), is pioneering the development of a funds management to already existing dwelling assets to solve Australia's property market's affordability crisis by co-investing alongside homebuyers".

Thornley was founding chair of Per Capita and National Secretary of the Australian Fabian Society. He was a board member of the Brotherhood of St Laurence and the Chifley Research Centre, was a founding director of GetUp!. Along with his wife, he founded LookSmart, the first Australian dot-com company listed on the NASDAQ. During the dot-com bubble, his stake in the company was worth almost $1 billion, but its value declined by 99% as the bubble burst. Thornley made an attempt to buy LookSmart's search engine competitor Google during its early days but founders Larry Page and Sergey Brin rejected the offer.

Thornley is a co-founder of the Goodstart Consortium, a social enterprise that owns the largest childcare network in the world (formerly called ABC Learning). His vision for Goodstart was to ensure Australia's children have the best possible start in life by providing the learning, development and wellbeing outcomes they need.

He was formerly the CEO of Better Place Australia, and Global CEO of Better Place LLC, which developed electric cars and charging or battery switching stations to support them.

Thornley served in public office for two years as the Labor member of the Victorian Legislative Council for the Southern Metropolitan Region, and as Parliamentary Secretary to premiers Steve Bracks and John Brumby.

== Background and early career ==
Thornley was raised in New South Wales by a single mother, under difficult circumstances . At one stage his mother had four children under the age of seven, and survived on welfare and the kindness of the local community. He has six sisters.

Thornley eventually went to live with his father in Melbourne. A gifted student, he attended Scotch College, Melbourne on a full scholarship and is a graduate of the University of Melbourne. He commenced his university studies in 1983 and served as president of the Student Representative Council, and then on the National Union of Students in 1987 and 1988. He completed a Bachelor of Commerce and a Bachelor of Laws degree in 1990 and, from 1991 to 1995, he was a consultant at McKinsey and Company, a management consultancy firm.

== Political career ==
Elected to the Parliament of Victoria in 2006, he served as Parliamentary Secretary assisting the Premier on the National Reform Agenda and Innovation. He is a noted donor to various progressive causes, including the Australian Labor Party.

On 28 December 2008, Thornley announced that he would resign from the Victorian Parliament, despite speculation that he would be chosen to serve as a minister in John Brumby's government. His resignation had a mixed response. Some Labor colleagues thought his decision "insulting", while others acknowledged that, for many people like Thornley who move into politics to make a real and personal impact, the reality of the slow pace of change within government can be frustrating and unsuitable.

After his departure he announced he had been appointed as the CEO of Australian operations for Better Place, a company promoting electric cars, which he said he thought was a "once-in-a-generation transformational project".

A joint sitting of the Legislative Assembly and the Legislative Council of the Victorian Parliament was required to select a new member to fill the vacancy caused by Thornley's resignation. It was the first casual vacancy to occur since the reform of the Legislative Council in 2006. Under the new rules, which mirror those of the Australian Senate, if the vacating MLC had been elected as a member of a political party, the joint sitting must select a person nominated by that political party. On 30 January 2009, it was announced that Melbourne lawyer Jennifer Huppert had been nominated by the ALP to fill the upper house vacancy.

== Post-political career ==
Having served as the Australian head of Better Place since his resignation from parliament, Thornley was elevated to global CEO of the company in October 2012, following the sacking of its founder and major spokesperson Shai Agassi. However, Thornley severed his connection with Better Place only three months later.

In January 2014, he became executive chair of Same Business Different Outcome (SBDO), a private equity firm. He is now executive chair of LongView, a property management company.

== Connection to Israel, Judaism ==
Thornley first went to Israel while at University on a Young Political Leaders' Tour and was part of a pro-Israel group humorously dubbed "the Mossad faction". He led an Australia Israel Chamber of Commerce trade mission to Israel in 2008 and has been a delegate to the Australia Israel Leadership Forum several times. He was secretary of the Parliamentary Friends of Israel and visited Israel over 30 times during his tenure at Better Place. He was a member of the strategic review panel for the Rabbinical Council of Victoria.

Thornley began a formal process of converting to Judaism in 2012 under Rabbi Adam Stein at Kehilat Nitzan, Melbourne's only conservative synagogue. Thornley formally completed the conversion process on 19 August 2014 and adopted the Hebrew name of "Lev Yonatan".
