= Sydney Leadership =

Organisation in Sydney, Australia

The Sydney Leadership program is an initiative of the Benevolent Society, and was started in 1999, with the aim of creating a network of committed individuals working together to bring about social change. It is based in Sydney, New South Wales, Australia.

== Overview ==
Each year about 50 individuals from all walks of society, many working at the cutting edge of their communities, join the Sydney Leadership Program. They then embark on a year of intensive courses and activities, which aim to provide participants with

- more in-depth knowledge of a range of social issues,
- clarity of values and purpose,
- greater skills and confidence to act and increased resilience,
- greater ability to partner and collaborate successfully,
- a broader network across corporate, community and government sectors,
- capacity to exercise leadership in challenging environments.

At the end of the year, participants join the Sydney Leadership Alumni Network. Together with alumni from the partner Rural, Community and Youth Leadership programs they form the Social Leadership Network, whose 300+ members form a network of committed individuals extending through key positions in society.

In 2009 the program cost $14,800 per participant.

== Achievements ==
Projects initiated by graduates of the Sydney Leadership Program include:

- Cultural/sports event for young refugees
- New humanities learning programs in prisons
- Rural business development in remote regions
- Teaching employable skills to disadvantaged youth
- Literacy in Prisons program
- Indigenous Leadership Programs
- Rural community futures - Moree 2020
- Community safety in Armidale
- Community Service Volunteer program in Lightning Ridge
- Youth unemployment in Wollongong
- Women on Boards
- Establishing a youth council in Leichhardt
- Bridging Generations in Penrith
- Uniting Christian & Muslim youth in western Sydney
- Building public housing estate networks
- Domestic violence – building family support networks
- Rural education in North West NSW

== Impact on community leaders ==
Sydney Leadership has a high profile, and has been addressed by many prominent leaders such as the former Prime Minister, John Howard . For example,

- Marie Bashir, Governor of New South Wales, said that Sydney Leadership has an enviable reputation for innovative approaches in addressing critical social issues.
- Clover Moore, Lord Mayor of Sydney, said Sydney Leadership makes an important contribution to the life of Sydney, working at many levels and across sectors of difficult social issues that lie beneath the surface of any large city.
- Bob Carr, as Premier of New South Wales, said We need leaders who have the ability to share information and ideas, to build strong and effective networks, and to engage the community. Sydney Leadership provides an ideal forum for such individuals to broaden their horizons and challenge accepted wisdom.
