= Royal Hospital for Women =

- New South Wales Department of Health

Geography
- Location: Randwick, Sydney, NSW, Australia
- Coordinates: 33°55′08″S 151°14′18″E

Organisation
- Care system: Public Medicare (AU)
- Type: Teaching, Specialist
- Affiliated university: University of Sydney, University of New South Wales
- Patron: Elizabeth Macquarie

Services
- Emergency department: Yes

Helipads
- Helipad: ICAO: YXSN
Number	Length		Surface
Number	ft	m	Surface
1			concrete
2			concrete

History
- Founded: 1820

Links
- Website: Royal Hospital for Women
- Lists: Hospitals in Australia

The Royal Hospital for Women (RHW) is a specialist hospital for women and babies located in the suburb of Randwick in Sydney, New South Wales, Australia. The Royal Hospital for Women shares the Randwick Hospitals' Campus site with the Prince of Wales Hospital and the Sydney Children's Hospital, as well as the Prince of Wales Private Hospital.

== History ==
The RHW began life in 1820 as a "lying-in" hospital under auspices of the Benevolent Society. Elizabeth Macquarie, wife of the then Governor of New South Wales Lachlan Macquarie chaired a committee of the Society to establish the hospital.

By 1888 the RHW (then known as the Benevolent Society Asylum) became affiliated to the University of Sydney as a training hospital. Between 1901 and 1997 the hospital operated from its site in Paddington, New South Wales before moving to Randwick. In 1904 the hospital was granted royal patronage by King Edward VII and became the Royal Hospital for Women.

== Services ==
As of 2011, the RHW reportedly provided the following services annually:

- Deliver more than 3,700 babies;
- Care of more than 600 premature babies;
- Treat more than 400 women for gynaecological cancer;
- Provide breast cancer surgery for more than 80 women;
- Attend to over 450 women requiring acute care services;
- Help more than 600 women through endo-gynaecological procedures;
- Provide care for over 10,000 women who rely on a special partnership with the RHW.

The RHW forms a part of the South Eastern Sydney and Illawarra Area Health Service and is assisted by the fundraising efforts of the Royal Hospital for Women Foundation.

=== Firsts ===
On 15 December 2023, the first baby (male) was born in Australia to a mother who received a transplanted uterus. Kristy Bryant received the uterus in January 2023 at the Royal Hospital for Women, and fell pregnant within three months through embryo implantation. The donor was her mother, Michelle.
