= Brisbane Bullets =

- 2026–27 Brisbane Bullets season
- Leagues: NBL
- Founded: 1979; 47 years ago
- History: Brisbane Bullets; 1979–2008, 2016–present
- Arena: Brisbane Entertainment Centre
- Capacity: 10,500
- Location: Brisbane, Queensland
- Team colors: Blue, gold, white
- CEO: Malcolm Watts
- Head coach: Will Weaver
- Team captain: Mitch Norton
- Ownership: Kevin Martin, Jason Levien & LK Group
- Championships: 3 (1985, 1987, 2007)
- Retired numbers: 4 (7, 22, 30, 52)
- Website: BrisbaneBullets.com.au
Home	Away

The Brisbane Bullets are an Australian professional men's basketball team in the National Basketball League (NBL) based in Brisbane, Queensland. They competed from 1979 to 2008, and returned to the league in 2016. Brisbane were one of ten NBL foundation teams and have won three NBL championships, being successful in the 1985 and 1987 seasons, and again in 2007. They have also competed in the 1984, 1986 and 1990 grand finals and have reached the playoffs 22 times.

On 30 June 2008, it was announced that the Bullets license had been returned to the NBL, following financial difficulties for owner Eddy Groves and the failure of attempts to find a new ownership group.

For the 2014–15 season, the NBL hoped for the return of a Brisbane-based franchise, bringing up the possibility of a Bullets resurrection. These hopes finally came to fruition on 17 September 2015, with the Bullets being revived for a return to the NBL in 2016–17.

== History ==
=== Early years ===
The Bullets were established in 1979 by Brisbane Amateur Basketball Association for the foundation season of the National Basketball League, under the captaincy of Bruce Fitzgerald, and head coach Bob Young. Of the 18 games played during the inaugural NBL season, Brisbane won 10 and lost eight, finishing in fifth place. Brisbane's Cal Bruton finished as the league's highest points per game scorer of the season.

The Bullets made it to the finals in the second NBL season of 1980. Dave Claxton took over as head coach as well. Finishing in third place, winning 17 of their 22-season games, the Bullets met the West Adelaide Bearcats in the second semi-final, losing 101–94. Brian Banks made the All-NBL first team that season. Banks became the Bullets' captain the following season. After making the finals in the second season, Brisbane did so again in 1981. Brisbane finished in fifth place, but first-placed St. Kilda did not attend the finals, as they were in Brazil contesting the World Club Championship. The Bullets lost to Launceston Casino City 71–69 in the first semi-final. In 1982, with new coach Rick Harden, the Bullets missed out on qualifying for the finals, finishing eighth. In the following season, they finished fifth, still outside of finals contention. Import guard Ron "The Rat" Radliff, known for his long curly hair and brilliant outside shooting, played his first season for the Bullets and in the NBL in 1983.

=== Championship years ===
Under new coach Brian Kerle, who would go on to win the 1984 Coach of the Year award, the Bullets' first playoffs appearance since 1981 came about after finishing the 1984 regular season in first place with a 19–5 record, a major improvement on their 10–12 record in 1983. After defeating the Coburg Giants and the Geelong Supercats in the finals, the team were into their first ever NBL Grand Final with the game to be played at The Glass House in Melbourne (1984 would be the last year that the NBL Grand Final was played at a pre-determined 'neutral' venue). Unfortunately, they were not successful in capturing their first championship, losing to the defending champion Canberra Cannons 84–82 who were led by the Australian Boomers point guard Phil Smyth. Star import Leroy Loggins, who had returned to the Bullets in 1984 after two seasons with the West Adelaide Bearcats, capped off a great season with the Bullets by winning his first of 3 NBL Most Valuable Player Awards as well as being named at Small forward in the All-NBL Team.

The Bullets had emerged as the league's most powerful team under Brian Kerle and again finished in first place the 1985 season with a 20–6 record, and were again Grand Finalists after a hard-fought win over the Cannons in the finals. With the game being held at their home venue, the Chandler Arena, the Bullets were still favourites to defeat the Adelaide 36ers (whose merger with the Bearcats in 1985 had seen them become an NBL force for the first time) in what was to be the last single game grand final in NBL history despite the 36ers defeating the Newcastle Falcons by the record score of 151–103 in their semi-final. Leading 78–74 going into the last period of play, the Bullets then outscored Adelaide 42–21, setting an NBL grand final record for points scored in the final period and easily accounting for the 36ers 120–95 to record their first ever championship win.

The team's major change during the 1986 season was when they moved out of the 2,700 seat Chandler Arena and into the brand new Brisbane Entertainment Centre which could seat up to 13,500 fans, easily giving the Bullets the largest and newest home arena in the NBL at the time (the next largest venue in the league was The Glass House which could only seat 7,200). Indeed, the Entertainment Centre was not only the NBL's but also Australia's then largest indoor arena. They finished the regular season in third place with a 17–8 record but progressed to their third Grand Final in a row with wins over the Sydney Supersonics and regular finals opponent Canberra in the playoffs. In the first ever NBL grand final series to be played over three games, the Bullets lost to the Ken Cole coached Adelaide 36ers 2–1, losing Game 3 of the series 113–91 in Adelaide (the 36ers had a league leading 24–2 record for the season including a 13–0 record at home). In the opening game, over 11,000 fans, a then indoor sports attendance record in Australia, saw the 36ers defeat the Bullets 122–119 in overtime at the Entertainment Centre, while they became the only team to defeat the 36ers in Adelaide in 1986 when they won Game 2 104–83 at the Apollo Stadium. Leroy Loggins was again voted the league's MVP in 1986, giving himself and Brisbane a second MVP title while he was again a unanimous selection to the All-NBL Team. Crucially though, Loggins fouled out of both Game 1 and 3 of the Grand Final series which limited his on court impact.

1987 saw the Bullets back to second on the ladder (again behind only Adelaide) with a 20–6 season, earning themselves a bye in the playoffs until the semi-finals. There they defeated the Illawarra Hawks two games to one to advance to a league record fourth grand final in a row, where this time they were up against the Perth Wildcats in their first ever Grand Final series after upsetting the 36ers 2–1 in their semi-final series. Perth were player/coached by former Bullets favourite Cal Bruton, who had left the club at the end of 1986 after a public falling out with Brian Kerle. Bruton had successfully turned the Wildcats into a championship contender with the addition of forwards Kendall "Tiny" Pinder and the "Alabama Slamma" James Crawford. The Bullets won their second NBL championship, winning the first game 80–79 in a thriller in Perth, before taking out Game 2 106–87 at the Entertainment Centre in Brisbane. Leroy Loggins continued to star for the Bullets, and in 1987, he won his third MVP award (shared with Adelaide's 1986 Grand Final MVP Mark Davis), as well as being voted as the Grand Final MVP for the series win over the Wildcats (although the Grand Final MVP was his first official award, Loggins had also been the player of the game with 41 points in the 1985 Grand Final victory).

=== Form slump ===
The Bullets finished the 1988 regular season in third place with an 18–6 record, but they couldn't manage to reach their fifth grand final in a row after losing in the elimination final. A highlight of the 1988 season for the Bullets was first year player Shane Heal winning the NBL's Rookie of the Year award. The 1989 season saw the team fail to make the playoffs for the first time since 1983 when they finished the regular season in eighth place with an 11–13 record. In the wake of this disappointing season, the Bullets' line-up was extensively overhauled: Leroy Loggins, Greg Fox, and Robert Sibley were the only players from the 1989 Bullets team to continue with the club for the 1990 season, while both Larry Sengstock and Ron Radliff left to join the NBL's second Queensland-based team, the Gold Coast Cougars, for its inaugural season in 1990.

Boosted by new imports Derek Rucker and Andre Moore, the Bullets made a huge turn around in 1990, finishing in third place and going 18–8 for the season. They would again win their way into the grand final, again playing the Perth Wildcats. This time however the Bullets lost 2–1, losing Game 3 at home 109–86. Game 2 of the series, with the Bullets levelling at one game all with a 106–90 win, saw a then NBL grand final record crowd of 13,221 at the Brisbane Entertainment Centre. This would stand the highest ever grand final crowd for a game played outside of Melbourne until 13,527 saw Game 2 of the 2012–13 Grand Final series between the Wildcats and New Zealand Breakers at Perth Arena. The attendance remains the eighth largest for an NBL Grand Final game. Brian Kerle won his second Coach of the Year award, while new import guard Derek Rucker becoming the second Bullets player to win the NBL's MVP award.

The 1991 season was not nearly as successful, as the team finished in ninth place, way out of finals contention with a 13–13 record. However, in 1992, the Bullets were back in the finals, making it to the quarter-finals. In 1993, former NBL Coach of the Year (1988) and championship winning coach of the North Melbourne Giants (1989) Bruce Palmer became the new Bullets coach, and the team made it as far as the semi-finals.

From 1994 through to the 1996 seasons, the Bullets made it as far as the quarter-finals, finishing in fifth, sixth and eighth place respectively. David Ingham took over as head coach for the 1996 and 1997 seasons, with Brian Kerle returning to the club to coach the Bullets from 1998 to 2000. During this time, the high cost of playing home games at the Brisbane Entertainment Centre (along with falling attendances) forced the Bullets to move to the smaller (4,000) capacity Brisbane Convention & Exhibition Centre from the 1998 season.

=== Continued decline ===
The Bullets failed to get to the finals during the early years of the 2000s. The 2000–01 season was especially disappointing for the Bullets, as they finished second-last on the regular season table, winning just 4 of their 28 fixtures. Although, the Bullets won 22 of their 33 fixtures in 2003–04 to finish in a more respectable fourth place on the ladder.

The team qualified for the finals in the 2004–05 and the 2005–06 seasons. They finished in fifth place in 2005–06, and hosted the Perth Wildcats at home in Game 1, though they lost 96–91 and were eliminated.

=== Back on top ===
Brisbane Bullets logo (1998–2008)

The addition of veteran Australian Boomers centre and the NBL's all-time leading rebounder Mark Bradtke after the 2005–06 season saw expectations rise for the Bullets once more. During the 2006–07 pre-season Blitz, the Bullets won all three of their group stage games to finish at the top of Pool A and advance to the quarter-finals. Defeating the Wollongong Hawks and the Sydney Kings to make it into the final, the Bullets went on to defeat the Melbourne Tigers to win the pre-season title.

Following on from their pre-season success, the Bullets easily won the minor premiership for the 2006–07 season, claiming an end of season record of 28 wins and only five losses. This included an all-time NBL record-breaking 21-game winning streak, marking the Bullets' most successful season in their history. After defeating the Sydney Kings in the semis, Brisbane made their first NBL grand final since 1990. They took out the finals series 3–1 over defending champions the Melbourne Tigers to be crowned NBL champions for a third time.

=== League departure ===
In March 2008, following the 2007–08 season, the Bullets' childcare-centre mogul owner Eddy Groves – who had run into financial strife with his ABC Learning Centres empire – announced he would be forced to sell the club. On 16 April 2008, Logan businessman David Kemp was officially announced as the new owner. However, Kemp pulled out of the sale, and attempts to find a new ownership group were unsuccessful. On 30 June 2008, it was announced that the Bullets' license had been returned to the NBL.

=== Hope for revival ===
In August 2011, Basketball Australia CEO Larry Sengstock revealed that there had been significant progress towards returning a team to Brisbane for the 2012–13 season and that he wanted the team to be called the Bullets. However, in May 2012, the NBL announced that the Bullets' return was rejected, on the heels of another Queensland-based team, the Gold Coast Blaze, going into administration.

In November 2013, with the NBL under new management, CEO Fraser Neill announced that bringing the Bullets back to Brisbane was a priority. In March 2014, the #BringBackTheBullets social media campaign across Facebook, Twitter and Instagram commenced with an aim to raise awareness for the return of professional basketball to Brisbane as soon as possible.

=== Return to the league ===
After years of public outcry to have a Brisbane team back in the NBL, moves were finally put in place to have the Bullets return to the league for the 2016–17 season in September 2015. It was announced that the team would primarily adopt the traditional Queensland sporting colours of maroon and gold as well as retaining their blue heritage colour, plus return to their former home venue at the Brisbane Convention & Exhibition Centre, Southbank. The Bullets' traditional colours of blue and gold was brought back for the 2017–18 season.

== Home arena ==
Upon the Bullets' entry to the NBL in 1979, the team was based at the Auchenflower Stadium. They remained there until 1983 before moving to the larger Sleeman Sports Centre in Chandler at the start of the 1984 season. The Bullets remained at Chandler until relocating to the 13,500 seat Brisbane Entertainment Centre in Boondall midway through 1986, staying at Boondall until the end of the 1997 season. From 1986 until the South East Melbourne Magic and Melbourne Tigers started using the 15,400 capacity National Tennis Centre (now Rod Laver Arena) in 1992, the BEC was the largest and most modern venue used in the NBL. The Brisbane Convention & Exhibition Centre in South Bank then became the Bullets' home court from 1998 to 2008.

Although the Convention Centre was the Bullets' home venue at the time, for the 2007 NBL Grand Final series against the Melbourne Tigers, they moved back to the larger capacity Brisbane Entertainment Centre.

The Brisbane Entertainment Centre was the site of the NBL's first 10,000-plus Grand Final attendance when 11,000 fans saw Game 1 of the 1986 Grand Final series between the Bullets and the Adelaide 36ers. The largest attendance for the Bullets was on 26 October 1990 when 13,221 fans saw them defeat the Perth Wildcats 106–90 in Game 2 of the 1990 Grand Final series.

The move to the BEC was a risky one as it was (at the time) almost twice the capacity of the NBL's next largest venue, the 7,200 seat Glass House in Melbourne. However, the move was a success, with the Bullets pulling in record attendances and it was the move to the BEC that was the catalyst for growth in the NBL. Previously teams had played out of small arenas and even local sports centres (e.g. Auchenflower Stadium) which had limited seating. Indeed, the smallest venue in the NBL at the time was the 1,500 seat Perry Lakes Basketball Stadium in Perth (in 1985 the average size NBL venue was just 3,008. By 1992, the average size had risen to 7,155). In the years following Brisbane's move, other large venues such as the Perth Entertainment Centre (8,200), Sydney Entertainment Centre (12,500), Adelaide's Clipsal Powerhouse (8,000) and the National Tennis Centre in Melbourne (15,300) became regular NBL venues, with other teams following the lead of the Bullets.

With their return to the NBL in 2016, the Bullets chose the Convention Centre as their regular home venue, and the Entertainment Centre in Boondall as their alternate venue for marquee matches. However, with the construction of Nissan Arena in 2019, the Bullets chose to relocate to combine their front office, training centre and home stadium into one facility.

In June 2024, the Bullets announced that they would return to the Brisbane Entertainment Centre for the 2024–25 NBL season.

- Auchenflower Stadium (1979–1983)
- Sleeman Sports Centre (1984–1986)
- Brisbane Convention & Exhibition Centre (1998–2008, 2016–2019)
- Nissan Arena (2019–2024)
- Brisbane Entertainment Centre (1986–1997, 2007, 2016–2019, 2024–present)

== Retired jerseys ==
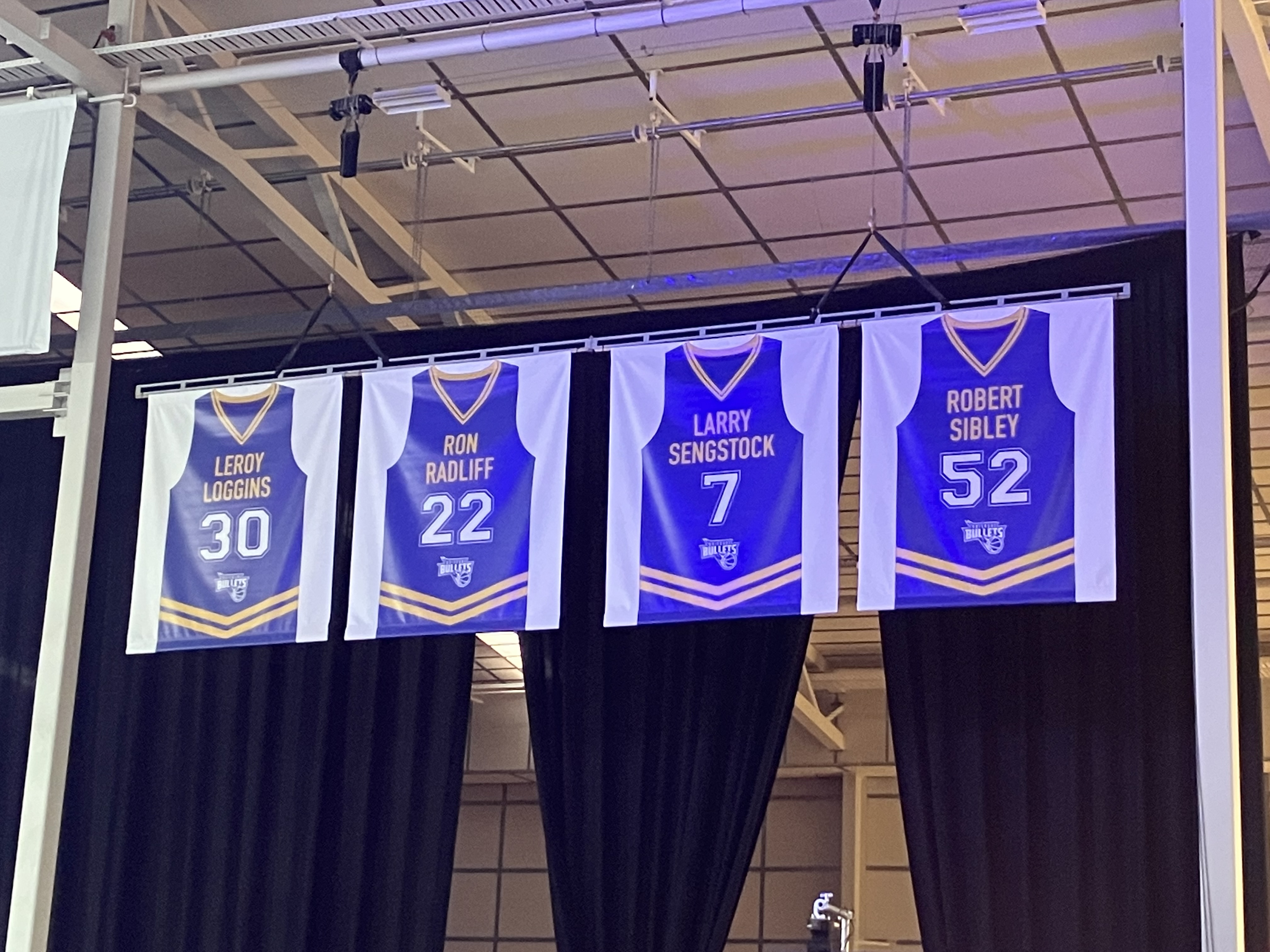
Brisbane Bullets retired jerseys hanging at Nissan Arena, December 2022

- #7 Larry Sengstock
- #22 Ron Radliff
- #30 Leroy Loggins
- #52 Robert Sibley

== Honour roll ==
NBL Championships:	3 (1985, 1987, 2007)
Regular Season Champions:	3 (1984, 1985, 2007)
NBL Finals Appearances:	22 (1980, 1981, 1984–1988, 1990, 1992–1999, 2004–2005, 2005–2006, 2006–2007, 2007–2008, 2018–2019)
NBL Grand Final appearances:	6 (1984–1987, 1990, 2007)
NBL Most Valuable Players:	Leroy Loggins (1984, 1986–1987), Derek Rucker (1990), Steve Woodberry (1999), Sam Mackinnon (2007)
NBL Grand Final MVPs:	Leroy Loggins* (1987); Sam Mackinnon (2007)
All-NBL First Team:	Brian Banks (1980), Larry Sengstock (1982), Leroy Loggins (1984, 1985, 1986, 1987, 1988, 1990, 1993, 1994), Andre Moore (1990), Derek Rucker (1990), Steve Woodberry (1998, 1999), Stephen Black (2004), Sam Mackinnon (2007), Ebi Ere (2008)
All-NBL Second Team:	Leroy Loggins (1991, 1992, 1995, 1997), Shane Heal (1994), Steve Woodberry (1997), Chuck Kornegay (1998), Randy Rutherford (2002), Bobby Brannen (2004, 2005), Sam Mackinnon (2006), C. J. Bruton (2008), Torrey Craig (2017), Daniel Kickert (2017), Nathan Sobey (2024)
All-NBL Third Team:	Andre Moore (1993), Mike Mitchell (1996), Steve Woodberry (1996), Kevin Freeman (2004), Stephen Black (2005), C. J. Bruton (2007)
NBL Coach of the Year:	Brian Kerle (1984, 1990), Joey Wright (2004, 2007)
NBL Rookie of the Year:	Shane Heal (1988), John Rillie (1995)
NBL Most Improved Player:	Wade Helliwell (2002), Reuben Te Rangi (2019), Will Magnay (2020), Tyrell Harrison (2025)
NBL Best Defensive Player:	Leroy Loggins (1987, 1990), Ben Castle (2004), Sam Mackinnon (2007), Torrey Craig (2017)
NBL Best Sixth Man:	Mike McKay (1996)

* Leroy Loggins was also the Player of the Game in the 1985 NBL Grand Final win, but there was no official Grand Final MVP awarded in 1985.

Source: www.nbl.com.au

== Season by season ==
NBL champions	League champions	Runners-up	Finals berth

Season	Tier	League	Regular season					Post-season	Head coach	Captain	Club MVP
Season	Tier	League	Finish	Played	Wins	Losses	Win %	Post-season	Head coach	Captain	Club MVP
Brisbane Bullets
1979	1	NBL	5th	18	10	8	.556	Did not qualify	Bob Young	Bruce Fitzgerald	not awarded
1980	1	NBL	3rd	22	15	7	.682	Lost semifinal (West Adelaide) 94–101	Dave Claxton	Bruce Fitzgerald	not awarded
1981	1	NBL	5th	22	13	9	.591	Lost semifinal (Launceston) 69–71	Dave Claxton	Brian Banks	not awarded
1982	1	NBL	8th	26	12	14	.462	Did not qualify	Rick Harden	Brian Banks; Larry Sengstock	not awarded
1983	1	NBL	5th	22	10	12	.455	Did not qualify	Rick Harden	Larry Sengstock	not awarded
1984	1	NBL	1st	24	19	5	.792	Won preliminary final (Coburg) 105–104; Won semifinal (Geelong) 107–103; Lost NBL final (Canberra) 82–84	Brian Kerle	Larry Sengstock	Leroy Loggins
1985	1	NBL	1st	26	20	6	.769	Won semifinal (Canberra) 93–76; Won NBL final (Adelaide) 121–95	Brian Kerle	Larry Sengstock	Leroy Loggins
1986	1	NBL	3rd	26	17	9	.654	Won elimination final (Sydney) 100–82; Won semifinal (Canberra) 120–100; Lost NBL finals (Adelaide) 1–2	Brian Kerle	Larry Sengstock	Leroy Loggins
1987	1	NBL	2nd	26	20	6	.769	Won semifinals (Illawarra) 2–1; Won NBL finals (Perth) 2–0	Brian Kerle	Larry Sengstock	Leroy Loggins
1988	1	NBL	3rd	24	18	6	.750	Lost elimination final (Perth) 98–113	Brian Kerle	Larry Sengstock	Leroy Loggins
1989	1	NBL	8th	24	11	13	.458	Did not qualify	Brian Kerle	Larry Sengstock	Leroy Loggins
1990	1	NBL	3rd	26	18	8	.692	Won elimination finals (Sydney) 2–1; Won semifinals (Eastside) 2–0; Lost NBL finals (Perth) 1–2	Brian Kerle	Leroy Loggins	Derek Rucker
1991	1	NBL	9th	26	13	13	.500	Did not qualify	Brian Kerle	Leroy Loggins	Leroy Loggins
1992	1	NBL	7th	24	12	12	.500	Lost quarterfinals (Sydney) 0–2	Brian Kerle	Leroy Loggins	Leroy Loggins
1993	1	NBL	4th	26	16	10	.615	Won quarterfinals (Newcastle) 2–0; Lost semifinals (Perth) 1–2	Bruce Palmer	Leroy Loggins	Leroy Loggins
1994	1	NBL	5th	26	18	8	.692	Lost quarterfinals (Adelaide) 1–2	Bruce Palmer	Leroy Loggins	Leroy Loggins
1995	1	NBL	6th	26	16	10	.615	Lost quarterfinals (North Melbourne) 0–2	Bruce Palmer	Leroy Loggins	Leroy Loggins
1996	1	NBL	8th	26	14	12	.538	Lost quarterfinals (Melbourne) 1–2	Dave Ingham	Leroy Loggins	Steve Woodberry
1997	1	NBL	5th	30	15	15	.500	Lost elimination finals (Perth) 0–2	Dave Ingham	Leroy Loggins	Steve Woodberry
1998	1	NBL	4th	30	16	14	.533	Won elimination finals (Melbourne) 2–0; Lost semifinals (S.E. Melbourne) 0–2	Brian Kerle	Leroy Loggins	Steve Woodberry
1998–99	1	NBL	5th	26	13	13	.500	Lost qualifying finals (Melbourne) 0–2	Brian Kerle	Leroy Loggins	Steve Woodberry
1999–2000	1	NBL	10th	28	7	21	.250	Did not qualify	Brian Kerle	Leroy Loggins	Kelvin Price
2000–01	1	NBL	10th	28	4	24	.143	Did not qualify	Richard Orlick	Leroy Loggins	Simon Kerle
2001–02	1	NBL	7th	30	14	16	.467	Did not qualify	Richard Orlick	Simon Kerle	Randy Rutherford
2002–03	1	NBL	11th	30	6	24	.200	Did not qualify	Richard Orlick; Joey Wright	Simon Kerle	Damien Ryan
2003–04	1	NBL	4th	33	22	11	.667	Won quarterfinal (Melbourne) 112–101; Lost semifinals (Sydney) 0–2	Joey Wright	Derek Rucker	Stephen Black
2004–05	1	NBL	5th	32	17	15	.531	Won elimination final (Hunter) 113–99; Won quarterfinal (Adelaide) 125–110; Lost semifinals (Sydney) 0–2	Joey Wright	Derek Rucker	not awarded
2005–06	1	NBL	6th	32	17	15	.531	Lost elimination final (Perth) 91–96	Joey Wright	Sam Mackinnon	not awarded
2006–07	1	NBL	1st	33	28	5	.848	Won semifinals (Sydney) 2–0; Won NBL finals (Melbourne) 3–1	Joey Wright	Sam Mackinnon	not awarded
2007–08	1	NBL	3rd	30	20	10	.667	Won quarterfinal (New Zealand) 106–89; Lost semifinals (Melbourne) 0–2	Joey Wright	Sam Mackinnon	Ebi Ere
2016–17	1	NBL	8th	28	10	18	.357	Did not qualify	Andrej Lemanis	Adam Gibson	Torrey Craig
2017–18	1	NBL	8th	28	9	19	.321	Did not qualify	Andrej Lemanis	Adam Gibson	Travis Trice
2018–19	1	NBL	4th	28	14	14	.500	Lost semifinals (Perth) 0–2	Andrej Lemanis	Adam Gibson	Lamar Patterson
2019–20	1	NBL	5th	28	15	13	.536	Did not qualify	Andrej Lemanis	Rotating captaincy	Lamar Patterson
2020–21	1	NBL	6th	36	18	18	.500	Did not qualify	Andrej Lemanis	Jason Cadee	Nathan Sobey
2021–22	1	NBL	8th	28	10	18	.357	Did not qualify	James Duncan	Jason Cadee	Robert Franks
2022–23	1	NBL	9th	28	8	20	.286	Did not qualify	James Duncan; Sam Mackinnon; Greg Vanderjagt	Aron Baynes	Nathan Sobey
2023–24	1	NBL	7th	28	13	15	.464	Did not qualify	Justin Schueller	Nathan Sobey	Nathan Sobey
2024–25	1	NBL	8th	29	12	17	.414	Did not qualify	Justin Schueller	Mitch Norton	Casey Prather
2025–26	1	NBL	10th	33	6	27	.182	Did not qualify	Stu Lash; Darryl McDonald	Mitch Norton	Tyrell Harrison
Regular season record				1096	566	530	.516	3 regular season champions			
Finals record				68	32	36	.471	3 NBL championships			

As of the end of the 2025–26 season

*Note: In 1983 and 1984, the NBL was split into Eastern and Western divisions during the regular season.

== Current roster ==
Note: Flags indicate national team eligibility at FIBA-sanctioned events. Players may hold other non-FIBA nationalities not displayed.

Brisbane Bullets roster
Players
Coaches

Pos.	No.	Nat.	Name	Ht.	Wt.
G	0	(New Zealand)	Murray, Taine	1.96 m (6 ft 5 in)	93 kg (205 lb)
G	1	(Lithuania)	Velička, Arnas (I)	1.95 m (6 ft 5 in)	92 kg (203 lb)
F	2	(United States)	Williams, Jaylin (I)	2.03 m (6 ft 8 in)	111 kg (245 lb)
G	3	(Australia)	Mackinnon, Max	1.98 m (6 ft 6 in)	96 kg (212 lb)
G/F	4	(United States)	Hinton, Nate (I)	1.96 m (6 ft 5 in)	95 kg (209 lb)
G	5	(Australia)	Duach, Josh (DP)	1.96 m (6 ft 5 in)
F	6	(Australia)	Woodhill, Archie (NRP)	2.06 m (6 ft 9 in)	95 kg (209 lb)
G	8	(Australia)	Norton, Mitch (C)	1.84 m (6 ft 0 in)	90 kg (198 lb)
F	9	(South Sudan)	Mag, Mawot (IRP)	2.01 m (6 ft 7 in)	97 kg (214 lb)
F	10	(Australia)	McRae, Billy (DP)	1.98 m (6 ft 6 in)
F	11	(South Sudan)	Mayen, Lat	2.06 m (6 ft 9 in)	92 kg (203 lb)
G	13	(Australia)	Bruton, Rio (DP)	1.96 m (6 ft 5 in)
F	14	(Australia)	Rouhliadeff, Harry	2.06 m (6 ft 9 in)	104 kg (229 lb)
F	15	(Australia)	Holt, Jacob	2.08 m (6 ft 10 in)	113 kg (249 lb)
C	24	(New Zealand)	Harrison, Tyrell	2.14 m (7 ft 0 in)	115 kg (254 lb)
G	26	(Australia)	McDaniel, Sam	1.98 m (6 ft 6 in)	102 kg (225 lb)

Head coach

- (United States) Will Weaver

Assistant coach(es)

- (United States) Alex Grossman
- (Australia) Markus Klusemann
- (Finland) Hanno Möttölä

Legend

- (C) Team captain
- (DP) Development player
- (IN) Inactive
- (I) Import player
- (TP) Training player
- (NRP) Nominated replacement player
- (NS) Next Star player
- Injured

- Roster
Updated: 21 November 2026

== Notable players ==
Note: Flags indicate national team eligibility at FIBA-sanctioned events. Players may hold other non-FIBA nationalities not displayed.

Criteria

To appear in this section a player must have either:

- Set a club record or won an individual award while at the club
- Played at least one official international match for their national team at any time
- Played at least one official NBA match at any time.

- (South Sudan) / (Australia) Deng Adel
- (Australia) Cameron Bairstow
- (Australia) Stephen Black
- (New Zealand) Dillon Boucher
- (New Zealand) Craig Bradshaw
- (Australia) Mark Bradtke
- (United States) Taylor Braun
- (United States) / (Australia) Cal Bruton
- (United States) / (Australia) C. J. Bruton
- (Australia) Jason Cadee
- (United States) / (Australia) Lanard Copeland
- (United States) Torrey Craig
- (United States) Winston Crite
- (Australia) Mark Dalton
- (France) / (Spain) Tom Digbeu
- (Australia) John Dorge
- (Nigeria) Ebi Ere
- (United States) Kevin Freeman
- (United States) Alonzo Gee
- (Australia) Adam Gibson
- (Australia) Cameron Gliddon
- (Australia) Chris Goulding
- (Australia) Shane Heal
- (Australia) Wade Helliwell
- (Japan) Makoto Hiejima
- (Australia) Mick Hill
- (Australia) Tom Jervis
- (Australia) Daniel Kickert
- (United States) / (Spain) Chuck Kornegay
- (United States) / (Australia) Leroy Loggins
- (Australia) Sam Mackinnon
- (Australia) Will Magnay
- (United States) Dwayne McClain
- (Australia) Mike McKay
- (United States) / (Australia) Andre Moore
- (Australia) Danny Morseu
- (United States) Chris Munk
- (Australia) Mark Nash
- (United States) Lamar Patterson
- (Australia) Anthony Petrie
- (United States) / (Australia) Ron Radliff
- (Australia) Paul Rees
- (United States) / (Australia) Derek Rucker
- (United States) Randy Rutherford
- (Australia) Damien Ryan
- (Australia) Larry Sengstock
- (Australia) Robert Sibley
- (New Zealand) Tohi Smith-Milner
- (Australia) Nathan Sobey
- (New Zealand) Reuben Te Rangi
- (New Zealand) Mika Vukona
- (Australia) Brad Williamson
- (United States) Steve Woodberry

== Preseason games against NBA teams ==
ESPN

13 October 2017
19:00

boxscore

(Australia) Brisbane Bullets	93–114	(United States) Phoenix Suns
Scoring by quarter: 12–38, 33–33, 23–20, 25–23
Pts: Trice 20; Rebs: Kickert 10; Asts: Trice 5		Pts: Booker 31; Rebs: Bender, Chandler 9 Asts: Booker 6

Talking Stick Resort Arena, Phoenix, United States
Attendance: 8,297
Referees: Derek Richardson, Mark Ayotte, Ron Garretson
