= Goodstart Early Learning =

Australian not-for-profit early childhood education provider

- Type: Not-for-profit public company; registered charity
- Industry: Early childhood education and care
- Predecessor: ABC Learning
- Founded: 2009; 17 years ago
- Headquarters: 43 Metroplex Avenue, Murarrie, Brisbane, Australia
- Area served: Australia
- Key people: Ros Baxter (CEO); Paul Robertson AO (Chair)
- Revenue: A$1.68 billion (2025)
- Owner: The Benevolent Society; Mission Australia; Brotherhood of St Laurence; Social Ventures Australia
- Number of employees: ~16,000
- Website: www.goodstart.org.au

Goodstart Early Learning is an Australian not-for-profit provider of early childhood education and care. It is the largest early learning provider in the country, operating roughly 650 centres and caring for about 70,000 children from around 60,000 families. The organisation was formed in 2009 by a syndicate of four charities that acquired the centres of the collapsed for-profit operator ABC Learning, and it operates as a social enterprise, reinvesting its surplus in its centres, programs and staff rather than distributing profit. Its head office is in the Brisbane suburb of Murarrie.

The acquisition of the ABC Learning centres was financed through a layered structure of member capital, unsecured social investment notes, bank debt and a government loan that was widely described as a landmark in the development of impact investing in Australia. Beyond running its centres, Goodstart is a prominent advocate for public investment in the early years and has contributed to national reviews of the childcare sector.

== Structure and governance ==
Goodstart Early Learning Ltd is a not-for-profit public company and a registered charity. It is owned by its four founding organisations, The Benevolent Society, Mission Australia, the Brotherhood of St Laurence and Social Ventures Australia, and its surplus is directed toward its purpose rather than paid to shareholders. The organisation describes itself as a social enterprise that operates with commercial discipline while pursuing social goals, and it is one of the largest social enterprises in Australia. It is also the country's largest non-government provider of preschool and kindergarten programs.

== History ==
=== Collapse of ABC Learning ===
Goodstart's centres were previously operated by ABC Learning, founded in 1988, which grew to become Australia's largest childcare provider with close to 1,000 centres and was at one point one of the world's largest listed providers of childcare. Amid the global financial crisis, ABC Learning went into receivership in November 2008 after its debts overwhelmed the business, and receivers began selling the centres in two groups, roughly 720 regarded as financially viable and about 260 regarded as unviable. The collapse left the future of hundreds of centres and tens of thousands of childcare places uncertain and prompted government intervention.

=== Formation and acquisition ===
The idea of acquiring ABC Learning and running it for social purpose originated with Evan Thornley, a businessman and member of the Victorian parliament who also sat on the board of the Brotherhood of St Laurence. On learning in 2008 that the failing company was being sold, Thornley approached Social Ventures Australia chief executive Michael Traill to propose using the collapse to build a social enterprise at an unprecedented scale, a conversation Goodstart describes as the genesis of the venture. Thornley's place on the board of the Brotherhood of St Laurence in turn led that organisation, through its chief executive Tony Nicholson, to join the consortium in September 2009. The Goodstart syndicate was assembled in two stages. In November 2008 Social Ventures Australia (SVA), The Benevolent Society and Mission Australia joined together, and the Brotherhood of St Laurence joined in September 2009. SVA, led by its chief executive Michael Traill, acted as the convenor of the syndicate and managed the commercial transaction. The combined revenue and balance sheets of the four charities gave the group the standing to borrow the funds required to buy the ABC Learning assets.

On 9 December 2009 the syndicate, then trading as Goodstart Childcare Limited, was announced as the preferred bidder with an offer of A$95 million for 678 centres. The Australian Competition and Consumer Commission reviewed the acquisition, examining local overlaps between Mission Australia's existing centres and the acquired centres in south-east Melbourne, but did not oppose it. Goodstart progressively took over the centres from 2010 and completed the acquisition deal in 2011.

=== Financing and impact investing ===
The purchase used a financing structure that was novel for the Australian not-for-profit sector and is often cited as a milestone in the growth of impact investing in the country. The member charities contributed A$7.5 million; 41 social investors, drawn from more than 150 approached high-net-worth individuals, philanthropists and foundations, bought A$22.5 million of unsecured "social capital notes" carrying interest of about 12 per cent a year that Goodstart was not obliged to pay in years of insufficient free cash flow; the National Australia Bank provided A$50 million in senior debt as part of facilities worth up to A$120 million; and the Australian Government provided a A$15 million medium-term loan in the public interest. The bank and government loans were subsequently repaid, as were the social capital notes at the end of their term.

Goodstart has since used a social return on investment methodology to estimate its "social dividend". In 2023 it reported this as about A$5.60 for every dollar of targeted social investment, or around A$382 million. SVA, which has cited annual returns on its own investment in Goodstart, has presented the venture as a demonstration that private capital can be mobilised at scale for social purpose.

== Leadership ==
Robin Crawford was the founding chair of the group. Julia Davison joined as the founding chief executive in February 2011, when the organisation had roughly 660 centres and around 15,000 staff but was a financially precarious start-up. Over more than eleven years she oversaw its transition to financial stability alongside investment in quality, inclusion, reconciliation and safety, and she stepped down at the end of 2022.

In December 2022 the board announced that Dr Ros Baxter would become chief executive, and she began in March 2023. Baxter had previously been Deputy Secretary for Schools in the Australian Government Department of Education, with earlier roles in the Department of the Prime Minister and Cabinet and a background beginning in frontline child protection. Paul Robertson AO serves as chair of the board.

== Operations ==
Goodstart provides long day care, kindergarten and preschool programs, and vacation care, serving children from six weeks of age to school age across all states and territories. The number of centres has varied over time and has been reported at between roughly 640 and 665; around one third are in rural and regional areas and about one quarter are in low socio-economic communities. The organisation reported total revenue of about A$1.68 billion in 2025. Its centres are assessed against the National Quality Standard, the national benchmark administered under Australia's education and care regulatory system.

Goodstart also operates the Goodstart Institute, a registered training organisation that offers early childhood education and care qualifications to its staff and to the public. To inform its practice it maintains a Thought Leaders Advisory Group of academics and sector leaders, has developed a birth-to-three learning framework, and has used tools such as the Early Years Toolbox to assess children's development.

== Workforce and wages ==
Goodstart is one of Australia's larger private-sector employers, with a workforce of roughly 16,000 that is predominantly female. It has long supported the United Workers Union campaign for higher pay for educators and pays above-award wages, setting teacher salaries at levels comparable to state primary schools.

In 2024 Goodstart's staff voted for an enterprise agreement that delivered the Australian Government's funded Worker Retention Payment, a 15 per cent wage rise phased as 10 per cent from December 2024 and a further 5 per cent from December 2025. Goodstart was the first large provider to sign up to the payment on behalf of its educators, whose roughly 16,000 staff were among the first in the sector to receive it, and the arrangement extended through a multi-employer agreement with the United Workers Union and other employers. Eligibility for the payment was tied to a cap of 4.4 per cent on fee increases over twelve months as a cost-of-living measure for families. Goodstart and the Government pointed to falling educator and teacher vacancies and reduced reliance on agency and casual staff after the subsidy's introduction, and the Government committed A$3.6 billion in 2026 to extend the payment.

== Advocacy and policy ==
Goodstart advocates for greater public investment in the early years and for policy reform, arguing that access to quality early learning benefits children, families and the wider economy and that provision should be treated as a universal service. It made submissions to the Australian Competition and Consumer Commission childcare inquiry and to the Productivity Commission inquiry into early childhood education and care, both of which reported in 2023 and 2024, and welcomed their findings on affordability and quality while calling for further reform, including a review of the Child Care Subsidy hourly rate cap and directing future growth toward the not-for-profit sector. Goodstart has noted that vacancies in the sector rose sharply after the COVID-19 pandemic, forcing some centres, including its own, to close rooms because they could not find staff.

The organisation places particular emphasis on children in vulnerable circumstances, inclusion, reconciliation and Indigenous education.

== Death of a child at Edmonton (2020) ==
On 18 February 2020, three-year-old Maliq "Meeky" Nicholas Floyd Namok-Malamoo died after being left alone for about six hours in a locked minibus belonging to Goodstart's Edmonton centre, near Cairns in far north Queensland, during hot weather. His body was discovered in the afternoon by the centre director.

Two staff members were charged with manslaughter: centre director Michael Glenn Lewis and educator Dionne Batrice Grills. Lewis pleaded guilty to manslaughter in February 2021 and was sentenced to six years' imprisonment. Grills pleaded not guilty and was later acquitted at trial.

Goodstart itself pleaded guilty in the Cairns Magistrates Court to offences under the National Law, namely failing to adequately supervise a child, failing to take reasonable precautions to protect a child from harm, and failing to keep accurate attendance records. In September 2021 the company was fined A$71,000 and a conviction was recorded. Goodstart accepted responsibility for the death, and the Edmonton centre was permanently closed. Queensland's education regulator said the prosecution sent a strong message to providers about their duty to protect children from harm, and used the case to promote its "Look Before You Lock" transport-safety campaign.

== See also ==
- ABC Learning
- Child care
