= Damien Ryan (basketball) =

Australian basketball player

Personal information
- Born: 20 September 1979 (age 45); Melbourne, Victoria, Australia
- Listed height: 193 cm (6 ft 4 in)
- Listed weight: 88 kg (194 lb)

Career information
- Playing career: 1998–2011
- Position: Point guard / shooting guard

Career history
- 1998–2000: Canberra Cannons
- 2000–2003: Brisbane Bullets
- 2003: Carife Ferrara
- 2003–2005: Avellino
- 2005–2006: Teramo
- 2006–2007: Perth Wildcats
- 2007: Snaidero Udine
- 2007–2008: Vanoli Soresina
- 2008–2009: Aurora Basket Jesi
- 2010: Sandringham Sabres
- 2010–2011: Sydney Kings
- 2011: Cimberio Varese

Career highlights and awards
- NBL Rookie of the Year (1999)

Damien Ryan (born 20 September 1979) is an Australian former professional basketball player.

== Early life ==
Ryan was born in Melbourne, Victoria.

In 1997, Ryan attended the Australian Institute of Sport in Canberra.

== Professional career ==
Ryan debuted in the National Basketball League (NBL) in the 1998–99 season with the Canberra Cannons and won the NBL Rookie of the Year Award. He played a second season with the Cannons before joining the Brisbane Bullets in 2000. He played three seasons for the Bullets. He scored a career-high 42 points in January 2003 and averaged 18.6 points and 4.5 rebounds per game in the 2002–03 season.

In March 2003, Ryan joined Carife Ferrara of the Italian Lega 2. He played five games to finish the 2002–03 season.

For the 2003–04 season, Ryan joined Avellino of the Lega Basket Serie A. He averaged 9.2 points in 30 games. He continued with Avellino in 2004–05 and averaged 10.4 points in 34 games.

For the 2005–06 season, Ryan joined Teramo of the Serie A. He averaged 7.0 points in 33 games.

In December 2006, Ryan signed with the Perth Wildcats for the rest of the 2006–07 NBL season as an injury replacement for Adam Caporn. In 15 games, he averaged 14.1 points, 2.7 rebounds and 2.7 assists per game.

In April 2007, Ryan joined Snaidero Udine of the Serie A. He played seven games to finish the 2006–07 season.

For the 2007–08 season, Ryan joined Vanoli Soresina of the Lega 2. He averaged 10.9 points in 36 games.

For the 2008–09 season, Ryan joined Aurora Basket Jesi of the Lega 2. He averaged 12.4 points in 35 games.

In 2010, Ryan played for the Sandringham Sabres of the South East Australian Basketball League. He averaged 9.0 points in 10 games.

In June 2010, Ryan signed with the Sydney Kings for the 2010–11 NBL season. He averaged 6.7 points in 15 games.

In January 2011, Ryan left the Kings and signed with Cimberio Varese of the Serie A until 28 February. He averaged 5.8 points in five games.

== National team ==
Ryan was an Australian Boomers squad member in 2005 and 2006.
