= Adam Caporn =

Australian basketball player & coach (born 1982)

Washington Wizards
- Position: Assistant coach
- League: NBA

Personal information
- Born: 16 March 1982 (age 44) Perth, Western Australia, Australia
- Listed height: 190 cm (6 ft 3 in)
- Listed weight: 84 kg (185 lb)

Career information
- College: Saint Mary's (2001–2003)
- NBA draft: 2004: undrafted
- Playing career: 2003–2009
- Coaching career: 2010–present

Career history

Playing
- 2003–2006: Wollongong Hawks
- 2006–2009: Perth Wildcats

Coaching
- 2010–2014: Saint Mary's (assistant)
- 2014–2021: BA Centre of Excellence
- 2021–2022: Long Island Nets
- 2022–2024: Brooklyn Nets (assistant)
- 2024–present: Washington Wizards (assistant)

Adam Caporn (born 16 March 1982) is an Australian basketball coach and former player who is currently an assistant coach for the Washington Wizards of the National Basketball Association (NBA). He is also head coach of the Australia men's national basketball team, the Boomers.

Caporn played college basketball for the Saint Mary's Gaels before playing six seasons in the National Basketball League between 2003 and 2009, three with the Wollongong Hawks and three for the Perth Wildcats.

== Early life ==
Caporn was born in Perth, Western Australia, in the suburb of Baldivis.

== Playing career ==
In 2000 and 2001, Caporn played basketball at the Australian Institute of Sport (AIS) before heading to the United States to play college basketball for Saint Mary's College of California. After spending two seasons in the US, Caporn returned to Australia to play for the Wollongong Hawks in the Australian NBL.

After three years with the Hawks, Caporn returned to Western Australia in 2006 to play for the Perth Wildcats. In December of the 2006–07 season, Caporn suffered a knee injury that required surgery. After the surgery he was ruled out for the remainder of the season and was replaced in the line-up by Damien Ryan. On 26 April 2007, the Wildcats announced the re-signing of Caporn to a new two-year deal.

== Coaching career ==
Caporn served as an assistant coach with the Willetton Tigers in the State Basketball League in the 2007 season. He served as head coach of the East Perth Eagles during the 2009 State Basketball League season.

In 2010, Caporn served as a scholarship coach at the Australian Institute of Sport.

Between 2010 and 2014, he spent four seasons as an assistant coach with the Saint Mary's Gaels.

Between 2014 and 2021, Caporn served as head coach of the BA Centre of Excellence. He also served as head coach of the Australia men's national under-19 basketball team between 2014 and 2016. In 2017, he joined the Australia men's national basketball team as an assistant coach. He helped the Boomers earn the bronze medal at the 2020 Tokyo Olympics.

In July 2021, Caporn was named the head coach of the Long Island Nets of the NBA G League, the development team for the Brooklyn Nets.

On 6 July 2022, Caporn was named assistant coach for the Brooklyn Nets.

On 10 July 2024, Caporn became an assistant coach for the Washington Wizards. On 13 March 2025, Caporn was appointed head coach of the Australia men's national basketball team, becoming the 10th coach selected in Boomers' history. Following David Vanterpool's transition to the front office on 5 July 2026, Caporn was named as Washington's lead assistant.

== Personal life ==
Caporn and his wife Marcia Wallis have two children.

Caporn's brother Ben also played basketball.
