= Mike Hill =

Mike Hill may refer to:

- Mike Hill (golfer) (1939–2025), American golfer
- Mike Hill (bishop) (born 1949), English Anglican bishop
- Mike Hill (film editor) (1949–2023), American film editor
- Mike Hill (American politician) (born 1958), American politician in Florida
- Mike Hill (British politician) (born 1963), British politician, MP (2017–2021)
- Mike Hill (sportscaster) (born 1972), American television personality and talk show host
- Mike Hill (athletic director) (born 1968), American university sports administrator
- Mike Hill (mathematician) (born 1980), American mathematician
- Mike Hill (make-up artist), American make-up artist

== See also ==
- Michael Hill (disambiguation)
- Mick Hill (disambiguation)
