= ABC Learning =

Australian provider of early childhood education services

ABC Developmental Learning Centres
- Type: Public
- Traded as: ASX: ABS
- Industry: Early Childhood Education
- Founded: 1988; 38 years ago
- Defunct: 2010
- Fate: voluntary liquidated in 2009, acquired by Goodstart Early Learning
- Successor: Goodstart Early Learning
- Headquarters: Brisbane, Australia
- Key people: Eddy Groves (CEO)
- Owner: Goodstart Early Learning

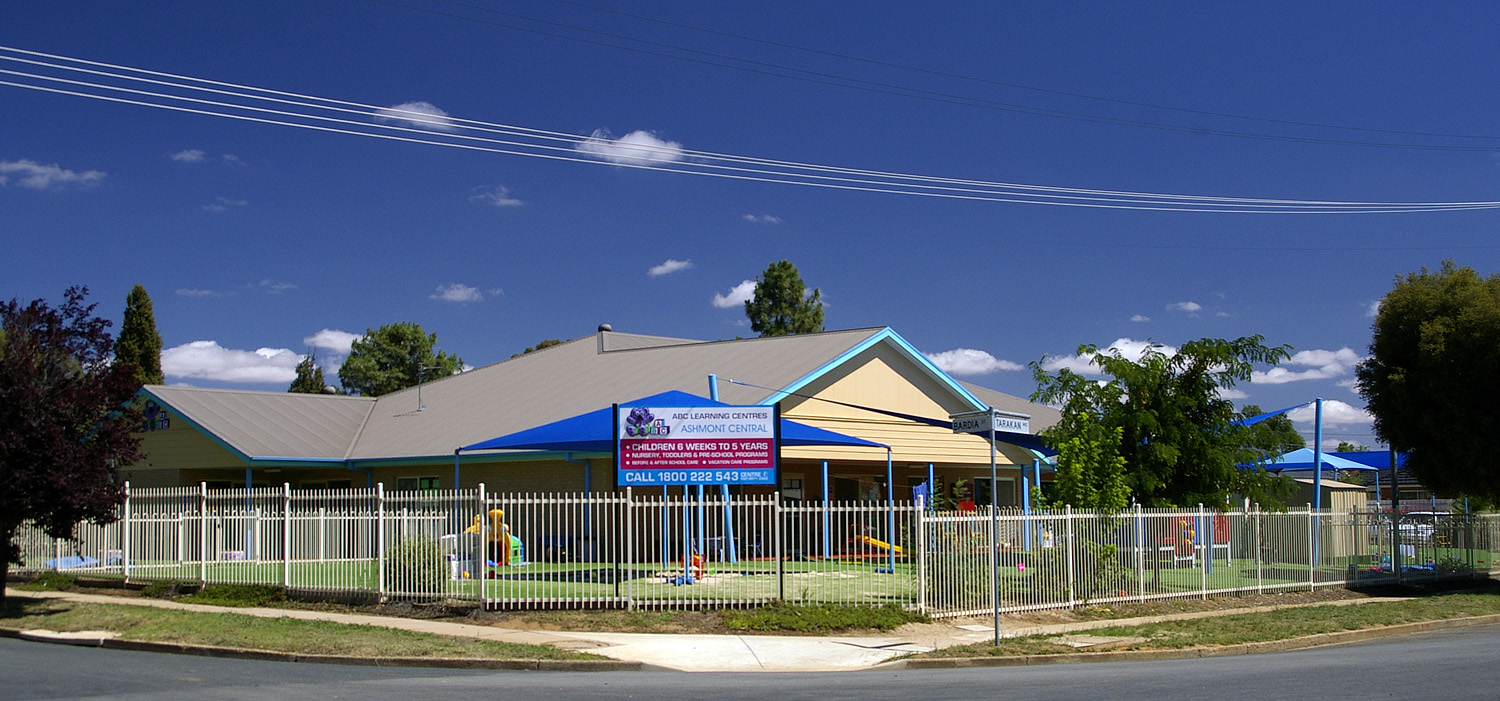
ABC Learning Centres Ashmont Central in Wagga Wagga

ABC Learning was an Australian company that was once the world's largest provider of early childhood education services. It was listed on the Australian Securities Exchange with its market capitalisation reaching A$2.5 billion in March 2006. The company went into administrative receivership after a fallout from the subprime mortgage crisis caused debt repayments to overwhelm the company, and the auditors failed to sign off on the financial reports citing the need to recast previous year's reported profits.

ABC Learning went into voluntary liquidation in 2008 and was bought by Goodstart Early Learning in December 2009. Goodstart was founded by a partnership of organisations; The Benevolent Society, Mission Australia, the Brotherhood of St Laurence and Social Ventures Australia. It operated over 650 former ABC Learning centres across Australia.

== History ==
ABC Developmental Learning Centres was founded in 1988 in Ashgrove, Queensland. ABC rapidly expanded, reaching 43 childcare centres by 30 June 2001. By 2003, ABC Learning had acquired 230 child care centres and entered into an agreement to acquired another 40 child care centres from Childs Family Kindergartens for $40 million.By November 2005, it had 697 Early Childhood Education centres throughout Australia and New Zealand. In March 2006, it forecast that would have 950 centres in Australia and New Zealand by 30 June 2006.

In 2005, ABC purchased the third largest childcare operator in the United States, Learning Care Group, which itself operated 467 centres in the US and other educational facilities in south-east Asia. The purchase provided ABC Learning with 70,000 additional licensed childcare places in addition to the 50,000 it had previously. Other mergers with Peppercorn Management Group and the purchase of Child Care Centres Australia helped provide a considerable increase in the number of ABC's centres.

At that time, the company planned to increase its number of centres by four a week. In March 2006, ABC announced a bid for Kids Campus, one of its few remaining large competitors in Australia, which would give it over another 100 centres.

On 12 December 2006, it was announced that ABC would acquire the second largest child care provider in the United States, Chicago based La Petite Academy for 330 million US dollars as well as the 5th largest provider in the United Kingdom, Busy Bees Group, Ltd. With these acquisitions they expanded into the UK market and increased their market share in the US to 1%.

ABC expanded aggressively into the outsourcing of child care services, negotiating deals with some of Australia's largest employers including the Australian Department of Defence which involved taking over the Department's nineteen childcare facilities. Aside from offshore expansion, the company expanded into training and education. It ran the ABC Early Childhood Training College providing training for childcare workers, and published Small Wonders, a magazine aimed at parents with young children.

It was a highly profitable company, in the FY2004/5 recording net profit after tax of $52.3 million on total revenues of $292.7 million. The six months ending 31 December 2005 showed no slowing in the financial momentum for the company with profit after tax reaching $38 million and revenues of $219.8 million.

ABC Developmental Learning Centres (ABC Learning) were the major sponsor of the Adelaide 36ers and once owned the Brisbane Bullets in the Australian National Basketball League.

In March 2008, ABC announced it would sell 60 percent of its American child care business to Morgan Stanley, using the proceeds to pay off accumulated debt. The sale, which valued 100% of the US subsidiary Learning Care Group at US$700 million, also involved a replacement of three board members.

ABC was voluntarily liquidated in 2008 and was acquired by GoodStart Childcare in December 2009. Re-branded as "Goodstart Early Learning", the organisation is now a registered charity owned by the Brotherhood of St Laurence, Mission Australia, The Benevolent Society and Social Ventures Australia. As of February 2011 the CEO of Goodstart was British-born Julia Davison. Davison worked in hospital administration in Britain, then headed government agencies in South Australia.

== Controversy and criticisms ==
Critics of ABC Learning said it was making considerable profits at the expense of Australian taxpayers whose money subsidised the use of childcare with means-tested tax rebates. In addition, the peak body for community-based childcare services in NSW, Community Child Care Co-operative (NSW), argued the profits of ABC Learning were built upon inequitable low staff wages and cost-cutting, which was detrimental to the quality of education and care, and that the business model would not be sustainable.

There was also controversy about the dramatic expansion of the company with claims that in some areas ABC - by acquisition - had achieved a monopoly in the provision of childcare services. The Australian Competition & Consumer Commission reviewed the company's acquisition of Peppercorn and permitted the deal to go ahead after imposing certain conditions including a requirement to close centres in some areas and agreeing not to purchase in other areas.

ABC Learning also used its considerable financial resources to support challenges to regulations governing childcare and enforcing vicarious liability on the company. In one case, in 2006 it challenged a $200 fine imposed by a Victorian Magistrate for the actions of its staff who failed to adequately supervise a two-year-old child who escaped from a centre in suburban Melbourne and was found by a neighbour and brought back to the centre. It argued that the company had done all it could reasonably be expected to do to provide facilities that made escape difficult and that any legal liability should rest with the staff involved.

In August 2006, ABC Learning pleaded guilty to 'Failing to Enclose' in the Fremantle Magistrates Court and were fined $1300. A three-year-old boy escaped from the centre in Lynwood in Western Australia, through a broken fence and was found by staff in a nearby car park.

The company was under investigation by the Australian Securities & Investments Commission.

== Financial troubles ==
ABC was once the largest publicly listed child-care operator in the world. It had a market capitalisation of $4.1 billion. When its shares were suspended from trading at 54c, the company's worth was $296 million.

An unexpected drop of 42 per cent in profit in the second half of 2007 to $37.1 million and its inability to service its $1.8 billion debt triggered a decline in the company's share price. Several directors of the company were then forced to dump millions of shares after receiving margin calls. The combined effects caused the share price to plummet 43% to $2.15 after trading as low as $1.15. By the end of the selling, founder Edmund/Eddy Groves and his wife sold virtually all of their stakes of 20 million and 6 million shares respectively while director Martin Kemp unloaded 2.7 million shares. The combined Groves' stake represented 8 per cent of the company.

Trading in ABC Learning shares was suspended in August 2008 after the company failed to release its earnings for the 2007-08 financial year.

=== Receivership and liquidation ===
Despite selling off assets, the company fell into receivership in November 2008 after increasing debt servicing obligations and its auditors were unable to sign off on its accounts. The federal government injected $22 million into the company to keep its childcare centres open until the end of 2008.

The company was subsequently delisted from the Australian Securities Exchange.

Creditors voted to wind up the company in June 2010. 570 ABC Learning centres were taken over by Goodstart, a consortium of Mission Australia, the Benevolent Society, the Brotherhood of St Laurence and Social Ventures Australia.
