= Robert Sibley (basketball) =

Australian basketball player

Personal information
- Born: 10 July 1966 (age 60) Brisbane, Queensland
- Listed height: 199 cm (6 ft 6 in)
- Listed weight: 103 kg (227 lb)

Career information
- Playing career: 1984–1997, 2003
- Position: Power forward

Career history
- 1984–1991: Brisbane Bullets
- 1992–1993: Melbourne Tigers
- 1994–1997; 2003: Brisbane Bullets

Career highlights
- 3× NBL champion (1985, 1987, 1993); No. 52 retired by Brisbane Bullets

Robert Sibley (born 10 July 1966) is an Australian former professional basketball player. He played in the National Basketball League (NBL) with the Brisbane Bullets and Melbourne Tigers. Sibley won three NBL championships: two with the Bullets in 1985 and 1987, and one with the Tigers in 1993. He was nicknamed "The Baseline Bandit" during his career due to the location where he excelled while on a basketball court.

Born in Brisbane, Queensland, Sibley made his debut for the Bullets in February 1984 as a 17-year-old. He retired in 1997 but returned to play five games for the Bullets in 2003 while the team suffered injury problems.

It was announced in 2020 that Sibley underwent chemotherapy after he had been diagnosed with cancer of the bladder and kidney. The Brisbane Bullets organised a fundraiser to help pay for Sibley's medical expenses. His number 52 was retired by the Bullets on 15 May 2021.
