= Have Mercy! (Michael Hill's Blues Mob album) =

Studio album by Michael Hill's Blues Mob
- Released: 1996
- Genre: Blues
- Length: 63:04
- Label: Alligator
- Producer: Michael Hill; Bruce Iglauer; Brian Young; Kevin Hill

Michael Hill's Blues Mob chronology
Bloodlines (1994)	Have Mercy! (1996)	New York State of Blues (1998)

Have Mercy! is the second album by the American band Michael Hill's Blues Mob, released in 1996. The band supported it with North American and Australian tours.

== Production ==
The album was produced by Hill, Bruce Iglauer, Brian Young, and Kevin Hill. Hill wrote 13 of the album's songs. He was backed by keyboardist E. J. Sharpe, drummer Tony Lewis, and bassist Kevin Hill. Hill was inspired chiefly by the music of Jimi Hendrix. Many of the songs are about the Black experience in America, with Hill's lyrics influenced by the works of James Baldwin and Toni Morrison. "Women Make the World Go 'Round" is a response to the many blues songs about men who think women have done them wrong. "Grandmother's Blues" is about an older woman killed by law enforcement. "Stagolee/Perspective" is an interpretation of the Stagger Lee story. "Rest in Peace" is an instrumental. "She's Gone" is a cover of the Hound Dog Taylor song.

== Critical reception ==
Professional ratings
Review scores
Source	Rating
DownBeat	3/5 stars
MusicHound Blues: The Essential Album Guide	3/5 stars
New York Daily News	3/5 stars
North County Times	B+
The Penguin Guide to Blues Recordings	3.5/4 stars
Pittsburgh Post-Gazette	2.5/4 stars
The Virgin Encyclopedia of the Blues	3/5 stars

The New York Daily News called Hill "an axe man who grinds through electric blues, hard rock, funk and reggae". Guitar Player said that Hill "takes chances, stretching boundaries with supple, supercharged solos and socially conscious lyrics." The Pittsburgh Post-Gazette labeled the album "urban blues with a passionate social conscience framed by [Hill's] hard-edged guitar." The Blade stated that Hill's "guitar solos set the fretboard ablaze in displays of both speed and intensity; his vocals have an appropriately emotional quality as he addresses topical themes"; the paper later included the album on its list of the 25 best albums of 1996. The North County Times praised "the jazz-influenced 'Let's Talk About the Weather'."

== Track listing ==
Have Mercy! track listing
No.	Title	Length
1.	"Presumed Innocent"	4:37
2.	"Lost in the Sauce"	3:41
3.	"Bluestime in America"	4:08
4.	"Women Make the World Go 'Round"	4:06
5.	"Grandmother's Blues"	5:20
6.	"Africa Is Her Name"	4:14
7.	"Let's Talk About the Weather"	6:06
8.	"Backyard in Brooklyn"	3:06
9.	"Falling Through the Cracks"	4:33
10.	"Stagolee/Perspective"	5:30
11.	"Sweeter Days"	4:08
12.	"Evil Spell"	4:06
13.	"Rest in Peace"	4:58
14.	"She's Gone"	4:31
Total length:		63:04
