= Lord Have Mercy =

Lord Have Mercy or Lord, have mercy may refer to:

- Lord, have mercy or Kyrie eleison, a Christian prayer
- Lord Have Mercy!, a Canadian television sitcom
- Lord Have Mercy (rapper), American hip hop musician
- "Lord Have Mercy", a song by Sparks, from Mad!, 2025

== See also ==
- Lord, Have Mercy on Us or Hospodine, pomiluj ny, a Czech song
- Lord, have mercy upon us (Mendelssohn), a 1833 motet by Felix Mendelssohn
