= Larry Sengstock =

Australian basketball player

Personal information
- Born: 4 March 1960 (age 66) Maryborough, Queensland, Australia
- Listed height: 198 cm (6 ft 6 in)
- Listed weight: 98 kg (216 lb)

Career information
- High school: Aldridge State (Maryborough, Queensland)
- Playing career: 1979–1996
- Position: Forward

Career history
- 1979–1981: St. Kilda Saints
- 1982–1989: Brisbane Bullets
- 1990–1992: Gold Coast Cougars/Rollers
- 1993–1996: North Melbourne Giants

Career highlights
- 5× NBL champion (1979, 1980, 1985, 1987, 1994); NBL Grand Final MVP (1979); All-NBL Team (1982); Australian Basketball Hall of Fame (2001)

Lawrence James "Larry" Sengstock (born 4 March 1960) is an Australian former professional basketball player and executive. He played 18 seasons in the National Basketball League (NBL) between 1979 and 1996 before later becoming chief executive officer of Basketball Australia.

== Early life ==
Sengstock was born in Maryborough, Queensland, where he graduated from Aldridge State High School. He was a good swimmer growing up before focusing on basketball at age 14. He played for Lang Park Basketball Club in Brisbane alongside his brothers, Rod and Geoff.

== Playing career ==
=== NBL ===
Sengstock debuted in the National Basketball League (NBL) in the league's inaugural season in 1979. He played his first three seasons with St. Kilda, winning NBL championships in 1979 and 1980 and earning the inaugural NBL Grand Final Most Valuable Player Award.

In 1982, Sengstock relocated back to Queensland and joined the Brisbane Bullets, where he earned his first and only All-NBL Team honour that year. In 1984, he became captain of the Bullets. He went on to win two NBL championships with the Bullets in 1985 and 1987, playing eight seasons in total before joining the Gold Coast Cougars in 1990 for their inaugural season in the NBL. Following the 1990 season, the Cougars' licence was revoked by the NBL and, during the buyout by the new owners, Sengstock was left out of pocket by $40,000 (Approx. $95,000 in 2024 terms). He ultimately re-joined Gold Coast, now the Rollers, for the 1991 season. In November 1991, Sengstock quit the Rollers to re-join his former club in Melbourne (now called the Southern Melbourne Saints). However, in January 1992, the Saints would merge with cross town rivals the Eastside Melbourne Spectres to form the South East Melbourne Magic. Sengstock was subsequently left without a contract and chose to return to the Gold Coast Rollers for the 1992 season.

In 1993, Sengstock finally returned to Melbourne by signing with the North Melbourne Giants. There he'd win another championship in 1994 before finally retiring following the 1996 season.

In total, Sengstock played 456 NBL games over 18 seasons. He recorded 5,083 points (12.2 ppg), 2,981 rebounds (7.1 rpg), and 764 assists (1.8 apg). The NBL's Grand Final MVP award was named the Larry Sengstock Medal in his honour and in 2001, he was named to the Australian Basketball Hall of Fame.

=== National team ===
Sengstock was named to the 1980 Australian Olympic team and played for the Boomers at the Moscow Olympics. He also represented Australia at the 1984 Los Angeles Olympics, 1988 Seoul Olympics and 1992 Barcelona Olympics, and at four FIBA World Championship tournaments (1978, 1982, 1986 and 1990).

== Executive career ==
In April 2009, Sengstock was appointed chief executive officer of Basketball Australia. He resigned from his position in April 2012.

== Honour roll ==
NBL career:	1979–1996
NBL Grand Final appearances:	8 (1979, 1980, 1984, 1985, 1986, 1987, 1994, 1995)
NBL Championships:	5 (1979, 1980, 1985, 1987, 1994)
NBL Grand Final MVP:	1 (1979)
All-NBL First Team:	1 (1982)
NBL 20th Anniversary Team:	1998
NBL 25th Anniversary Team:	2003

== NBL career stats ==
Games:	456 (56 StK, 208 Bri, 74 GC, 118 NM)
Points:	12.0 pg
Field goals:	2,345 / 5,102 (46.0%)
3 Points:	72 / 229 (31.4%)
Free Throws:	704 / 1,176 (59.9%)
Rebounds:	7.1 pg
Assists:	1.8 pg
Steals:	0.9 pg
Blocked Shots:	0.6 pg
