= Wayne Carroll (basketball) =

Australian basketball player

Personal information
- Born: 16 February 1959 (age 67)
- Listed height: 6 ft 5 in (1.96 m)
- Listed weight: 202.8 lb (92 kg)

Career information
- NBA draft: 1981: undrafted
- Playing career: 1980–1990

Career history
- 1980-1987: Coburg Giants
- 1987-1990: North Melbourne Giants

Career highlights
- 1x NBL champion (1989)

Wayne Carroll (born 16 February 1959) is a retired Australian basketball player. As part of the National Basketball League, Carroll played in 287 games between 1980 and 1990. He competed in the men's tournament at the 1984 Summer Olympics and the 1988 Summer Olympics.
