= Community Child Care Co-operative (NSW) =

Community Early Learning Australia
- Founded: 1978
- Type: Non-government organisation, Peak body
- Purpose: Representing the interests of early education and care services in NSW.
- Location: Level 32, 200 George Street, Sydney NSW 2000
- Region served: New South Wales
- Members: 2,040 (as at October 2015)
- Key people: Michele Carnegie, CEO. Wendy Lindgren, Acting Chairperson.
- Employees: 40

Community Early Learning Australia is a peak organisation for children's services in New South Wales, Australia. It was known as Community Child Care Co-operative (NSW) up until 2017. It is a not-for-profit organisation. Its stated goals are to "inform and inspire the early education and care sector, and influence government policy, practices and programs so children in NSW can access quality early education and care that meet the needs of their communities." As such, it advocates for early education and child care services in New South Wales.

== History ==
The organisation began in 1978. Predecessor groups and organisations that inspired its creation included the New South Wales Council for Social Service (NCOSS), the women's movement, the Women's Trade Union Commission and the Community Resource Network (an organisation for school-aged children). Most directly, it was a breakaway group that was a spinoff from Community Child Care Victoria, itself originally an action group called Community Controlled Child Care. Set up as an advisory service, it was funded by NSW-based Family and Children's Services Agency (FACSA).

Legal authority for the organisation is the National Vocational Education and Training Regulator Act of 2011.

== Goals ==
Community Early Learning Australia advocates for education and care services, especially those run on a non-profit basis by local communities. It is a registered training organisation, and helps education and care services to operate their centres according to government regulations and guidelines. The organisation also advocates and campaigns for accessible, affordable and high-quality educational services for children and their families in NSW. Funded by the NSW and Australian governments, Community Early Learning Australia also earns income through membership and the sale of resources. Its office is based in the Addison Road Community Centre in Marrickville.

Community Early Learning Australia provides advice and commentary and addresses issues such as services under threat of closure, funding for early childhood education and care programs provided through federal and state governments, quality of educational standards for educators, the quality of education and care provided to children and, in general, issues that affect the sector.

== Programs and services ==
=== Advocacy and Peak ===
Community Early Learning Australia advocates for education and care services and for the children and families who use these services. Community Early Learning Australia is funded by the NSW Government as the peak body for community-based education and care services in NSW. Education and care services and individuals can become members or associates of Community Early Learning Australia. Community Early Learning Australia has made several submissions on behalf of is members to inquiries and reviews.

=== Children’s Services Central ===
Children's Services Central was the Professional Support Co-ordinator in NSW between 2005–2016, and was funded by the Australian Government Department of Education under the Inclusion and Professional Support Program (IPSP) to provide professional development and support to education and care services. Children's Services Central was managed by a consortium of key organisations to resource and support the education and care services sector in NSW. Community Early Learning Australia (as Community Child Care Co-operative (NSW)) was the lead agency for this consortium, which includes Contact Inc., Ethnic Child Care, Family and Community Services, NSW Family Day Care Association, Network of Community Activities and Semann & Slattery. Funding for Children's Services Central ceased on 30 June 2016.

=== Professional Development and Support ===
Community Early Learning Australia provides professional development and support to education and care services. This includes a range of training for education and care services, and the production of a range of resources, books, magazines, newsletters and information kits.

=== Registered Training Organisation ===
Community Early Learning Australia is a Registered Training Organisation offering a range of Nationally Recognised Training for staff working in education and care services.

=== Children’s Services Community Management ===
Children's Services Community Management holds the licence for two long day care centres and three preschools.

== Structure ==
Community Early Learning Australia is a membership-based organisation, comprising over 2,000 service members, and headed by a seven-member board of directors, including Wendy Lindgren, Chairperson, Ariane Simon, Maria Pender, Gary Withyman, Gabrielle Connell, Eve Hawkes and Fiona Burman. Michele Carnegie is the CEO (since May 2018).

== Campaigns ==
Community Early Learning Australia (as Community Child Care Co-operative (NSW)) has co-ordinated several campaigns since its inception, aimed at persuading state and Australian governments to increase funding to preschools and early education and care in general, as well as advocating for improved quality outcomes for services, including the ‘1:4 Make it Law’ campaign to improve the ratios of staff to babies from 1:5.

== Publications ==
Community Early Learning Australia publishes books, information guides, manuals, magazines and newsletters, covering topics that affect the education and care services sector, which are written and published by industry experts to promote discussion and promote professional development in the education and care services sector. Publications include:

- Rattler: a quarterly magazine featuring essays and articles about social, economic, educational and political issues that affect the sector, from both industry and human-interest perspectives.
- Broadside: a politically-orientated newsletter that is produced monthly to deliver the latest education and care industry news.
- Shortside: a e-newsletter for immediate announcements and news for the sector.
- A Director’s Manual: Managing an early education and care service in NSW: a 380-page manual to inform directors about their role.
- So Now You Are On The Committee: A handbook for committee members of children's services: a book aimed at committee members of community-based education and care services.
