= Mick Hill (basketball) =

Australian basketball player

Personal information
- Born: 27 August 1978 (age 48) Melbourne, Australia
- Listed height: 197 cm (6 ft 6 in)
- Listed weight: 89 kg (196 lb)

Career information
- Playing career: 2003–2008
- Position: Shooting guard / small forward

Career history
- 2002–2003: Canberra Cannons
- 2004–2008: Brisbane Bullets

Mick Hill (born 27 August 1978) is an Australian basketball player who played for the Canberra Cannons and the Brisbane Bullets in the National Basketball League. He currently plays for the Knox Raiders in the SEABL.
