= Benevolent Society =

Charitable organization in Australia

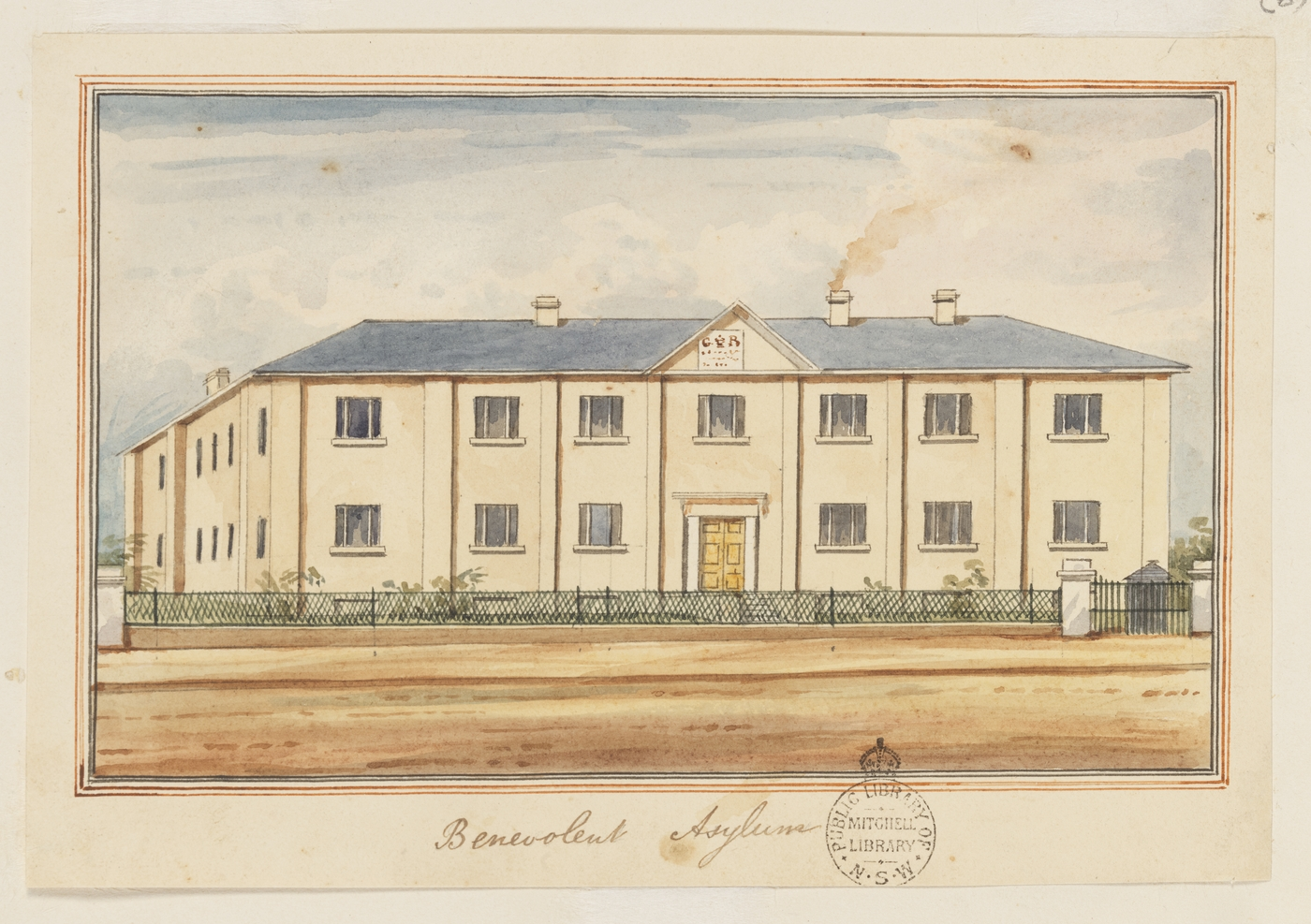
- Sydney Benevolent Society building, 1840s
- Formation: 1813
- Founder: Edward Smith Hall
- Founded at: Sydney, New South Wales
- Chair: Ken Smith
- Chief Executive Officer: Kevin Barrow
- Website: https://www.benevolent.org.au/

The Benevolent Society, founded by Edward Smith Hall in 1813, is Australia's first and oldest charity. The society is an independent, not-for-profit organization whose main goals include helping families, older Australians and people with disabilities.

The Benevolent Society centers around the advancement of society and positive change. Many of today's essential services in Australia were pioneered by The Benevolent Society, and its legacy of advocacy for progressive, positive change continues to inform their work today.

The organization currently delivers services from 60 locations across New South Wales, including four main Sydney hubs and a national office, and the ACT, and 16 sites in Queensland. It has 1600 staff, plus a volunteer force of about 700. More than 56,000 people were reached through The Benevolent Society's 90 services, community programs and events in 2016–17. The chief executive officer is Kevin Barrow, and the chair of the company is Ken Smith.

== Foci ==
The Benevolent Society focuses its programs on providing services to older Australians, people with disability, keeping children safe and well, and assisting families, especially those at risk.

=== Aging ===
The Benevolent Society provides older Australians with services for house independence, and assisting carers' needs. These include:

- housekeeping
- laundry
- nursing care
- personal care assistance
- meals
- transport
- social activities and outings
- physiotherapy
- podiatry
- counseling
- dementia care

=== Disability ===
The Benevolent Society is the largest provider of disability services in NSW. It has been an approved NDIS (National Disability Insurance Scheme) provider since 2016, working to help people transition to the NDIS and providing many of the services under the scheme. The Benevolent Society offers these services:

- physiotherapy
- speech therapy
- occupational therapy
- nutrition support
- psychology
- nursing
- counselling
- exercise
- personal care, including respectable assistance with washing and dressing
- assistance with meal preparation, or delivered ready-made meals
- help with hobbies, outings and events.

=== Child and family ===
The Benevolent Society helps families with 64 services provided to more than 44,000 people, from playgroup to parenting education and coaching, household budgeting, to practical support and family counselling.

== Leadership ==
Social Leadership Australia (SLA) was established by The Benevolent Society in 1999 to "design and deliver a suite of innovative leadership development programs to develop the capacity of individuals, organizations and communities to create lasting, positive change on entrenched issues". Programs included Sydney Leadership, Queensland Leadership and a four-day Introduction to Adaptive Leadership. They worked directly with organisations to develop and deliver customized programs to build internal leadership capacity. All programs were based on an Adaptive Leadership approach developed by Professor Ron Heifetz at Harvard University. The Benevolent Society closed SLA in 2017 due to the evolution of the market and the proliferation of leadership programs available.

== History ==
On 8 May 1813, Edward Smith Hall and several other 'like-minded gentlemen' formed what was initially known as ‘The New South Wales Society for Promoting Christian Knowledge and Benevolence’. It is the first charitable organization dedicated to doing universal good in Australia, and was later known as The Benevolent Society.

=== 19th century ===
- 1813: First private charitable organization dedicated to meeting the needs of the poorest groups in Australian society, assisting people far beyond the capacity of government. While its origins were Christian, it went to become a non-religious, non-affiliated organization.
- 1815: NSW Governor Lachlan Macquarie became a regular donor.
- 1818: In June, The Benevolent Society of NSW was formed, assisted by Rev William Cowper, with the greater purpose to 'relieve the poor, the distressed, the aged, and the infirm' and to encourage industrious habits. It provided cash loans, grants, clothing and food. Governor Macquarie was the patron and successive governors of NSW occupy the position.
- 1820: First to introduce district nursing, taking care of people who were isolated.
- 1821: Benevolent Asylum, a refuge for homeless older men, deserted women and children, and the mentally ill, opened at the corner of Pitt and Devonshire St in Sydney. It was reclaimed in 1901 to build Sydney's Central Railway Station
- 1849: Female factory at Parramatta closed following the cessation of Transportation. Former inmates became the responsibility of The Benevolent Society
- 1851: Benevolent Society used the Liverpool Hospital to house male paupers.
- 1852-3: NSW Society for the Relief of Destitute Children created by The Benevolent Society. Subsidies from the British government ceased.
- 1862: Government takes responsibility for the care of men and older destitute people, due in part to the scale of demands for support and relief and subsequent overcrowding at Benevolent Asylum.
- 1866: Part of the Benevolent Asylum designated exclusively as a 'lying-in’ (maternity) hospital. By 1876, the Lying-in Hospital of NSW recorded the lowest infant mortality rate and lowest death rate in childbirth of any hospital in Australia. It became a teaching hospital for medical students at the University of Sydney in 1888.
- 1873: The NSW government appointed a royal commission to investigate public charities. Benevolent Society was commended for its work.
- 1879: Benevolent Society began offering free legal aid to poor women in order to pursue cases of maintenance against the fathers of their children.
- 1892: Benevolent Society campaigned to outlaw child labour and baby farming, with Society president Sir Arthur Renwick initiating the introduction of the NSW Child Protection Act. The Act was amended in 1896 on Renwick's initiative to "enable children whose widowed or deserted mothers could not support them to be boarded out to their own parents".
- 1896: Sir Arthur Renwick was a leading voice in the campaign for the Old Age Pension. It was eventually introduced by the NSW Government in 1901.

=== 20th century ===
- 1902: The Benevolent Society is incorporated by an Act of Parliament (NSW), and the first women directors appointed to the board.
- 1905: Royal Hospital for Women established by The Benevolent Society and operated by The Benevolent Society until 1992, pioneering medical care for women and babies and ground breaking techniques such as the first baby health clinics to give children the best start in life, new techniques such as ultrasound, and the use of pasteurized milk to reduce the infant death rate.
- 1912: First ante natal (pre natal) clinic in the British Empire opened at the Royal Hospital for Women.
- 1917: Scarba House in Bondi was provided to the Society as a welfare home for women and children, and opened in September. It was operated by the Society until 1986 as a home for children as they awaited adoption or respite care. Many were child migrants from the UK. It was closed in 1986, and the building sold to Mirvac, a real estate investment company, for redevelopment in 2013.
- 1937: Royal Hospital for Women approved as a research institution by the National Health and Medical Research Council
- 1950: 100,000th baby born at Royal Hospital for Women.
- 1964: First Village for the Aged: William Charlton Village, Allambie Heights.
- 1968: Benevolent Society Adoption Agency opened; closed in 1975.
- 1969: Mirrabooka Retirement Village opened in Little Bay.
- 1971-2: Walter Cavill Retirement Village at Bondi and Rockdale Centenary Retirement Village at Bexley opened. Walter Cavill Village closed in 2006, and Rockdale Centenary transferred to Scalabrini in 2009.
- 1977: The Benevolent Society began providing parenting services to single mothers.
- 1980: Sir Philip Baxter Child Care Centre opened in Woollahra.
- 1987: The Benevolent Society introduced early intervention programs for families at risk.
- 1989: The Benevolent Society elects its first female president, Mrs Judith May OAM.
- 1991: PARC (Post Adoption Research Centre) opens, the first of its kind in NSW, to coincide with the implementation of the NSW Adoption Information Act.
- 1992: Management of the Royal Hospital for Women transferred to the NSW government.
- 1999: Sydney Leadership established, transforming leadership thinking and practice. Closed in 2017.

=== 21st century ===
- 2002: Social Ventures Australia established as part of SLA, investing in social change and supporting social entrepreneurs. Closed in 2017.
- 2004: The Benevolent Society apologized unreservedly for any abuse, mistreatment or harm experienced by children in its care. Apology available on The Benevolent Society website.
- 2007: First Queensland service opens: North Gold Coast Early Years Centre.
- 2009: Fostering Young Lives (FYL) begins.
- 2009: Joint foundation of GoodStart to acquire the ABC Learning Childcare Centres.
- 2011: Advocating change at a national level with the ‘Speak up for Kids’ and ‘Australians for Affordable Housing’ campaigns
- 2011: The Benevolent Society apologised unreservedly for any pain, unresolved grief or suffering experienced by mothers, fathers, adoptees, adoptive parents or their families as a result of the past adoption practices of The Benevolent Society, the Royal Hospital for Women or Scarba Welfare House for Children.
- 2013: Scarba House and the site on which it sits sold to Mirvac for redevelopment.
- 2013: The Benevolent Society's 200th anniversary.
- 2013: The Benevolent Society launches a $10 million social benefit bond, also known as social impact bond, in partnership with the Commonwealth Bank of Australia and Westpac to fund early intervention program Resilient Families.
- 2014: Implementation of The Benevolent Society's Reconciliation Action Plan (RAP).
- 2014: The Benevolent Society saves The Shack Youth Services in Maroubra from closure.
- 2014: Anne Hollands leaves after three years as CEO. Joanne Toohey takes over as Interim CEO.
- 2015: Joanne Toohey appointed CEO by the Board, led by chairman Lisa Chung.
- 2015: Appointment of Nyikina man of Western Australia, Charles Prouse, to The Benevolent Society Board.
- 2015: Ocean St Property, Bondi, purchased for the creation of the 'Apartments for Life' project which was to be developed into a subsidized apartment complex for older Australians so they would never have to leave their homes, sold to Mirvac after a number of council delays and opposition by local residents.
- 2016: The Benevolent Society launches research into the Adequacy of the Age Pension with Per Capita and the Longevity Innovation Hub. Determining it was inadequate, The Benevolent Society launched an advocacy campaign for better conditions for older Australians including the Fix Pension Poverty campaign.
- 2016: Transfer of ownership of residential care facility Sir William Charlton Village in Allambie Heights to Allambie Heights Village Ltd.
- 2017: The Benevolent Society selected by the NSW government to take over provision of disability clinical services across NSW including in rural and regional areas.
- 2017: Introduction of technologically advanced mobile working environment within The Benevolent Society to make it a leading, progressive not-for-profit.
- 2017: The Benevolent Society continues to advocate for older Australians with the launch of a research report about ageism, in anticipation of the launch of a public campaign called EveryAGECounts.
- 2018: The Benevolent Society launches a child protection campaign to keep children safe and well in their homes wherever possible.
- 2021: The Benevolent Society appointed Lin Hatfield Dodds as CEO.
- 2025: Lin Hatfield Dodds steps down as CEO. Stefan Duvenhage appointed interim CEO while a search for a new CEO is conducted

== See also ==
- List of non-profit organizations based in New South Wales
