= Michael Hill's Blues Mob =

American blues band

Michael Hill's Blues Mob is an American blues trio. The members have variously included Michael Hill, his bass guitar playing brother, Kevin, and singing sisters, Wynette and Kathy.

Originally formed in the early 1990s by Michael Hill (born 1952, The Bronx, New York, United States), the Blues Mob is a trio - however they sometimes add keyboards. Hill came to blues music from the atypical social and musical background of the Bronx and the Black Rock Coalition.

With the release of their first album Bloodlines in 1994, Michael Hill's Blues Mob established themselves. Bloodlines went on to earn the Living Blues Critic's award for Debut Blues Album of the Year. The next four years saw the band release two more albums on Alligator Records; Have Mercy! (1996) and New York State of Blues (1998). Michael Hill's Blues Mob have appeared at the Chicago Blues Festival and Memphis in May. Their tours have included most of Europe, with five trips each to Brazil and Australia.

Michael Hill's Blues Mob released their fourth album, Suite: Larger Than Life in 2001 on Singular Records in the US and Dixiefrog in Europe. This was followed by a concept album, Electric Storyland Live (2003), and the compilation album, Black Gold and Goddesses Bold (2005).

== Discography ==
- Bloodlines (Alligator Records, 1994)
- Have Mercy! (Alligator Records, 1996)
- New York State of Blues (Alligator Records, 1998)
- Suite: Larger Than Life (Singular Records, 2001)
- Electric Storyland Live (Ruf Records, 2003)
