= Kendal Pinder =

Bahamian basketball player

Personal information
- Born: 25 April 1956 (age 70) The Bahamas
- Listed height: 203 cm (6 ft 8 in)
- Listed weight: 95 kg (209 lb)

Career information
- High school: Hawksbill (Freeport, The Bahamas); Miami Northwestern (Miami, Florida)
- College: East Tennessee State (1975–1976); Miami Dade (1976–1977); NC State (1977–1979)
- NBA draft: 1979: 5th round, 101st overall pick
- Drafted by: Atlanta Hawks
- Playing career: 1979–1992, 1995
- Position: Power forward / center

Career history
- 1979–1980: Hapoel Jerusalem
- 1984–1985: Turun NMKY
- 1985–1986: Sydney Supersonics
- 1987–1992: Perth Wildcats
- 1995: Illawarra Hawks

Career highlights
- 2× NBL champion (1990, 1991); All-NBL Team (1985); NBL scoring champion (1985); Israeli Premier League Top Scorer (1980)
- Stats at Basketball Reference

Kendal Nathaniel "Tiny" Pinder (born 25 April 1956) is a Bahamian former professional basketball player. He moved to the United States as a teenager and attended Miami Northwestern Senior High School in Florida. Pinder played college basketball for the East Tennessee State Buccaneers, Miami Dade Sharks and NC State Wolfpack. He started his professional career with stints in Israel and Finland; he also spent three seasons with the Harlem Globetrotters.

Pinder moved to Australia in 1985 to play in the National Basketball League (NBL) with the Sydney Supersonics and was selected to the All-NBL Team when he led the league in scoring during his first season. He joined the Perth Wildcats in 1987 and won two NBL championships with the team in 1990 and 1991. Pinder's career was interrupted in 1992 when he was imprisoned for sexual assault offences. He was released in 1995 and had his final basketball stint with the Illawarra Hawks that same year.

Pinder has since spent periods in prison for various offences. He was sentenced to five years imprisonment in 1996 for sexual assault charges involving a teenager. Pinder was imprisoned in 2021 for 15 months after being convicted of stalking a woman. In 2024, he was sentenced to eight years in prison for two sexual assaults that occurred in 2009 and 2021.

== Early life ==
Pinder was born in The Bahamas where he was raised in Nassau and Freeport. He was nicknamed "Tiny" by his grandmother because he was small when he was young. He was a victim of violence as a child. Pinder fell through a plate glass window at the age of 12 and suffered head injuries that were potentially linked to longstanding cognitive issues. He started playing basketball as a teenager.

Pinder attended Hawksbill High School in Freeport from 1968 to 1972. He was enrolled under the name "Nathaniel Forbes" using his father's surname. Pinder did not attend school for one year.

Pinder moved to Miami, Florida, to earn a college basketball scholarship. He changed his name to "Kendal Pinder" upon his arrival for unexplained reasons. Pinder enrolled at Miami Northwestern Senior High School in 1973 but was declared ineligible to play on the basketball team during his first season because his family did not accompany him during his move. He became eligible for the 1974–75 season where he was a junior in class standing but a senior in eligibility because of the year he missed in the Bahamas. Pinder averaged 19 points per game and led Northwestern to a 25–5 record on their way to a Greater Miami Athletic Conference championship.

A 1976 investigation by The Miami News concluded that Pinder was likely ineligible to play during the 1974–75 season. Northwestern received records from Hawksbill that were "grossly incomplete and, perhaps, inaccurate." Pinder claimed that he was in tenth grade at Hawksbill during the 1971–72 school year which meant that his Northwestern eligibility expired after the 1973–74 school year; a student became ineligible for athletics in Florida four years from the time he first entered ninth grade.

== College career ==
On 29 April 1975, Pinder signed to play college basketball for the East Tennessee State Buccaneers. He averaged 13.5 points and 7.2 rebounds per game during the 1975–76 season. Pinder was dismissed from the team in 1976 for "violating university regulations."

Pinder decided to transfer to Miami Dade College because he would have been required to sit out a year if he joined another four-year school. He averaged 18.6 points and 12 rebounds per game during the 1976–77 season at Miami Dade.

On April 29, 1977, Pinder signed to join the NC State Wolfpack. He averaged 11.2 points per game from 1977 to 1979.

== Professional career ==
Pinder was selected in the fifth round of the 1979 NBA draft by the Atlanta Hawks.

For the 1979–80 season, Pinder played in Israel for Hapoel Jerusalem. He was the Israeli Premier League's top scorer, with a total of 586 points scored.

Between 1980 and 1983, Pinder performed with the Harlem Globetrotters.

For the 1984–85 season, Pinder played in Finland for Turun NMKY. His 32.8 points per game was second in the Korisliiga, while his 14.8 rebounds per game led the league.

Pinder followed his Turun head coach, Paul Coughter, to the Sydney Supersonics of the Australian National Basketball League (NBL) in 1985. He was named to the All-NBL Team and led the league in scoring during his first season.

In 1987, Pinder joined the Perth Wildcats. He was named the Wildcats' Club MVP in 1989 and helped the Wildcats win back-to-back NBL championships in 1990 and 1991. His final season with the Wildcats came in 1992. He was named in the Wildcats' 30th Anniversary All-Star Team.

After spending three years in prison for sexual convictions, Pinder was signed by the Illawarra Hawks in 1995. The signing was made by his former Wildcats teammate and then-Hawks head coach, Alan Black, who defended the decision despite Pinder's criminal history. He played five games for the Hawks during the 1995 season. On 18 May 1995, Pinder's contract was terminated by the Hawks after he was charged with sexual assault.

== Personal life ==
Pinder has 12 children. His son, Keanu, is also a professional basketball player.

Pinder has cognitive impairment in the frontal lobe and possesses the cognitive level of a 14-year-old.

Pinder was granted Australian citizenship in 1986; however his citizenship was revoked in 2007. Following the cancellation of his Australian citizenship, Pinder was on an ex-citizen visa that enabled him to remain in Australia but did not allow him to return should he leave. The Department of Immigration and Border Protection cancelled his visa in 2017, but it was overturned in 2019 by the Administrative Appeals Tribunal despite acknowledgment that Pinder did not pass the character test. Pinder's visa was again cancelled in 2024.

== Sexual assault offences and imprisonment ==
In 1976, Pinder was found guilty of unlawful carnal knowledge of a teenage girl in Miami, Florida. He was given five years probation.

In 1992, Pinder faced charges of attempted sexual assault. He was convicted by the Western Australian Supreme Court and was sentenced to 18 months' jail. In the following year he was also found guilty of raping a 23-year-old woman and a 16-year-old girl; the three offences had occurred between 1988 and 1990. He was released from prison in 1995.

In 1996, Pinder was sentenced to five years' jail for sexual offences involving a 15-year-old girl committed during his honeymoon in Wollongong in May 1995.

In 2001, Pinder was acquitted in the New South Wales District Court on a charge of raping a 19-year-old woman the previous year. In 2013, he was arrested on a charge relating to an alleged rape in 1987 but was cleared in August 2016.

In 2021, Pinder was arrested and charged with stalking a woman in Sydney. He was sentenced to 15 months' imprisonment. In April 2023, he pleaded guilty to two counts of sexual assault that occurred in November 2009 and March 2021. In March 2024, he was sentenced to eight years' prison for the two assaults; the backdated sentence took into account his time in custody and could see him released as early as October 2026. The judge noted Pinder's impaired cognitive function in deciding his sentence, which had a maximum penalty of 20 years' imprisonment.

Pinder was assaulted in prison in 2021 and 2023, requiring him to undergo CT and MRI scans for his injuries.
