= Guam men's national basketball team =

Guam
- FIBA ranking: 78 ▼1 (1 September 2026)
- Joined FIBA: 1974
- FIBA zone: FIBA Oceania
- National federation: Guam Basketball Confederation
- Coach: EJ Calvo

FIBA Asia Cup
- Appearances: 1

Oceanian Championship
- Appearances: 1
- Medals: Silver: 1999
Home	Away

The Guam men's national basketball team represents Guam in international competitions. It is administered by the Guam Basketball Confederation.

Guam is the only nation other than Australia and New Zealand to win a silver medal at the FIBA Oceania Championship. In 2025, they qualified for the FIBA Asia Cup for the first time.

== History ==
Guam became a member of FIBA in 1974 and competes within the FIBA Oceania zone. The men’s national team achieved its most notable early success by finishing as runner-up (silver medal) at the 1999 FIBA Oceania Championship, one of only three teams ever to reach the podium besides Australia and New Zealand.

Regionally, Guam has been highly competitive in the Pacific Games, winning gold medals in 1966, 2015, and 2019—most recently defeating Tahiti in the 2019 final to successfully defend its title.

In 2022, Guam hosted and swept the inaugural FIBA Micronesian Cup, capturing the men’s title and securing qualification for the 2023 Pacific Games. The event served as the official sub-zone qualifier for the regional competition.

In continental competitions, Guam pursued its first-ever qualification for the FIBA Asia Cup. During the Asian Pre-Qualifiers, their campaign began with a win over Thailand (75–69) in Ulaanbaatar, led by Jonathan Galloway. Galloway, along with Tai Wesley and Earnest Ross, anchored a dominant win over Singapore (82–59) in another pre-qualification matchup.

In the Asia Cup Pre-Qualifiers Second Round, Guam finished undefeated (5–0), narrowly defeating Mongolia (82–81) thanks to a clutch three-point shot by Ross, while Galloway tallied 19 points, 6 rebounds, 8 assists, and 6 steals. Galloway later expressed the team’s ambition: “We want a spot at the dinner table,” signaling Guam’s hunger to compete with Asia’s elite.

In March 2025, Guam advanced to the final round of Asia Cup Qualifiers in Taipei, preparing to face Chinese Taipei and Thailand for a berth in the continental championship. In a dramatic elimination game, they avenged an earlier heavy loss by defeating Thailand 89–81—Jericho Cruz led with 21 points and 8 assists, while Ross added 19 points and 9 rebounds.

Guam later lost to Japan (77–67) in Tokyo, in a result that underscored both their progress and the challenges of competing at Asia’s top level. Their qualification journey culminated in a historic debut at the 2025 FIBA Asia Cup, where Guam finished in 4th place—marking their best-ever result on the continental stage.

== Competitive performances ==
=== FIBA Asia Cup ===
FIBA Asia Cup record
Year	Round	Position	Pld	W	L
(Lebanon) 2017	Did not participate				
(Indonesia) 2022	Did not qualify				
(Saudi Arabia) 2025	Playoffs	12th place	4	1	3
Total		1/3	4	1	3

=== FIBA Oceania Championship ===
FIBA Oceania Championship record
Year	Round	Position	Pld	W	L
(New Zealand) 1971	Not a FIBA member				
(Australia) 1975	Did not participate				
(New Zealand) 1978	Did not participate				
(Australia) 1979	Did not participate				
(New Zealand) 1981	Did not participate				
(New Zealand) 1983	Did not participate				
(Australia) 1985	Did not participate				
(New Zealand) 1987	Did not participate				
(Australia) 1989	Did not participate				
(New Zealand) 1991	Did not participate				
(New Zealand) 1993	Did not participate				
(Australia) 1995	Did not participate				
(New Zealand) 1997	Did not participate				
(New Zealand) 1999	Runner-up	2nd	1	0	1
(New Zealand) 2001	Did not participate				
(Australia) 2003	Did not participate				
(New Zealand) 2005	Did not participate				
(Australia) 2007	Did not participate				
(Australia) (New Zealand) 2009	Did not participate				
(Australia) 2011	Did not participate				
(New Zealand) (Australia) 2013	Did not participate				
(Australia) (New Zealand) 2015	Did not participate				
Total	0 Titles	1/22	1	0	1

=== Oceania Basketball Tournament ===
- 1981 – (silver)
- 1997 – (silver)
- 2005 – (silver)
- 2009 – (bronze)

=== Pacific Games ===
Guam is the second most successful team in the Pacific Games, winning the trophy three times, one short of Tahiti. The team last won in 2015 and 2019.

- 1966 : (bronze)
- 1969 : 4th
- 1971 – 4th
- 1975 – (gold)
- 1979 – (gold)
- 1983 – (silver)
- 1987 – (bronze)
- 1991 – (silver)
- 1995 – 4th
- 1999 – (silver)
- 2003 – (silver)
- 2007 – (silver)
- 2011 – (silver)
- 2015 – (gold)
- 2019 – (gold)
- 2023 – (silver)

== Current roster ==
Roster for the 2025 FIBA Asia Cup.

Guam men's national basketball team – 2025 FIBA Asia Cup roster
Players
Coaches

Pos.	No.	Name	Age – Date of birth	Height	Club	Ctr.
	0	Zander Kamai	20 – 1 July 2005	1.91 m (6 ft 3 in)	Barrigada Crusaders	(Guam)
F	3	Mark Johnson Jr.	32 – 19 October 1992	1.98 m (6 ft 6 in)	Barrigada Crusaders	(Guam)
C	5	Jonathan Galloway	29 – 19 June 1996	2.11 m (6 ft 11 in)	APOEL BC	(Cyprus)
G	21	Blaise Ada	20 – 1 January 2005	1.75 m (5 ft 9 in)	Father Duenas Memorial	(Guam)
PF	24	Ben Borja II	27 – 26 February 1998	2.01 m (6 ft 7 in)	California Maritime	(United States)
SG	30	Takumi Simon	25 – 10 March 2000	1.88 m (6 ft 2 in)	Veltex Shizuoka	(Japan)
F	33	Earnest Ross	34 – 27 January 1991	1.96 m (6 ft 5 in)	Shonan United	(Japan)
PF	35	Matthew Fegurgur	23 – 4 September 2001	2.08 m (6 ft 10 in)	Long Beach State Beach	(United States)
SG	39	Jericho Cruz	34 – 11 October 1990	1.90 m (6 ft 3 in)	San Miguel Beermen	(Philippines)
F	42	Tai Wesley (C)	39 – 13 May 1986	1.93 m (6 ft 4 in)	South East Melbourne Phoenix	(Australia)

Head coach

- (United States) EJ Calvo

Assistant coach(es)

- (Guam) Chris Fernandez
- (Guam) Danny Payumo

Legend

- (C) Team captain
- Club – describes last
  club before the tournament
- Age – describes age
  on 5 August 2025

== Kit ==
=== Sponsor ===
2020: Bank of Guam

== See also ==
- Guam men's national under-18 basketball team
- Guam men's national 3x3 team
- Guam Basketball Association
