= Al Ramsay Shield =

International men's basketball competition

- Sport: Basketball
- Founded: 2001
- First season: 2001
- Last season: 2015
- Folded: 2015
- No. of teams: 2
- Country: Australia; New Zealand
- Continent: FIBA Oceania (Oceania)
- Last champion: Australia (8th title)
- Most titles: Australia (8 titles)
- Related competitions: FIBA Oceania Championship
- Website: FIBA Oceania

Al Ramsay Shield was an annual international men's basketball series played between the Australian Boomers and the New Zealand Tall Blacks. The competition was played in conjunction with the FIBA Oceania Championship.

The trophy is named after Australian basketball legend Alastair Ramsay, who was inducted into the Hall of Fame in 2004, and elevated to Legend by the Hall of Fame Honours Committee in 2006.

== Series winners ==
Results highlighted in blue are FIBA Oceania Championship Series, with the exception of the 2006 series, which adds an extra game on top of the regular three-game Al Ramsay Shield series. Those which aren't highlighted are general Al Ramsay Shield series.

Year	Hosts	Al Ramsay Shield Series				
Year	Hosts	Winners	Game 1	Game 2	Game 3	Runners-up
2001; Details	New Zealand	New Zealand	85–78	79–81 (overtime)	89–78	Australia
2003; Details	Australia	Australia	79–66	90–76	84–75	New Zealand
2005; Details	New Zealand	Australia	82–69	82–71	91–80	New Zealand
2007; Details	Australia	Australia	79–67	93–67	58–67	New Zealand
2009; Details	Australia; New Zealand	New Zealand	77–84	100–78	Two-legged tie	Australia
2011; Details	Australia	Australia	91–78	81–64	92-68	New Zealand
2013; Details	New Zealand; Australia	Australia	70–59	76–63	Two-legged tie	New Zealand
2015; Details	Australia; New Zealand	Australia	71–59	89–79	Two-legged tie	New Zealand

Year	Holders	Result	Challengers
2001	(New Zealand) Tall Blacks	2–1	(Australia) Boomers
2002	(New Zealand) Tall Blacks	Not held	(Australia) Boomers
2003	(New Zealand) Tall Blacks	0–3	(Australia) Boomers
2004	(Australia) Boomers	2–1	(New Zealand) Tall Blacks
2005	(Australia) Boomers	3–0	(New Zealand) Tall Blacks
2006	(Australia) Boomers	2–2 (Note: The New Zealand Tall Blacks won the 2006 Al Ramsay Shield, defeating the Australian Boomers in the four-game international basketball series on a point differential. The historic victory marked their first-ever series win on Australian soil.)	(New Zealand) Tall Blacks
2007	(New Zealand) Tall Blacks	1–2	(Australia) Boomers
2008	(Australia) Boomers	2–0	(New Zealand) Tall Blacks
2009	(Australia) Boomers	1–1 (Note: The New Zealand Tall Blacks won the 2009 Al Ramsay Shield, defeating the Australian Boomers in the two-game FIBA Oceania Championship Series on a point differential to claim both the continental title and the symbol of trans-Tasman basketball supremacy.)	(New Zealand) Tall Blacks
2010	(New Zealand) Tall Blacks	Not held	(Australia) Boomers
2011	(New Zealand) Tall Blacks	0–3	(Australia) Boomers
2012	(Australia) Boomers	Not held	(New Zealand) Tall Blacks
2013	(Australia) Boomers	2–0	(New Zealand) Tall Blacks
2014	(Australia) Boomers	Not held	(New Zealand) Tall Blacks
2015	(Australia) Boomers	2–0	(New Zealand) Tall Blacks

== See also ==
- FIBA Oceania
- FIBA Oceania Championship
- Australia men's national basketball team
- New Zealand men's national basketball team
