= 1999 FIBA Oceania Championship =

Continental basketball championship

FIBA Oceania Championship 1999
14th FIBA Oceanian Basketball Championship

Tournament details
- Host country: New Zealand
- Dates: October 2
- Teams: 2 (from 21 federations)
- Venue: 1 (in 1 host city)

Final positions
- Champions: New Zealand (1st title)

The FIBA Oceania Championship for Men 1999 was the qualifying tournament of FIBA Oceania for the 2000 Summer Olympics. Australia did not enter this tournament because they took the host spot of the Olympic tournament. The tournament was a one-game playoff between Guam and New Zealand, held in Auckland. New Zealand won and qualified for the 2000 Summer Olympics.

== Teams that did not enter ==
- American Samoa
- Australia
- Cook Islands
- Fiji
- Kiribati
- Marshall Islands
- Micronesia
- Nauru
- New Caledonia
- Norfolk Island
- Northern Mariana Islands
- Palau
- Papua New Guinea
- Samoa
- Solomon Islands
- Tahiti
- Tonga
- Tuvalu
- Vanuatu

== Results ==
October 2

New Zealand	125–43	Guam

Auckland

New Zealand qualified for the 2000 Summer Olympics in Sydney, Australia.

1999 Oceanian champions

New Zealand
First title
