= Casey Frank =

American/New Zealand basketball player

Personal information
- Born: October 23, 1977 (age 49) Port Jefferson, New York, U.S.
- Listed height: 6 ft 8 in (2.03 m)
- Listed weight: 240 lb (109 kg)

Career information
- High school: North (Phoenix, Arizona)
- College: Northern Arizona (1995–1999)
- NBA draft: 1999: undrafted
- Playing career: 1999–2016
- Position: Power forward

Career history
- 1999–2000: Paris SG
- 2000–2001: La Crosse Bobcats
- 2001–2002: Sallen Basket
- 2002–2009: Auckland Stars
- 2003: New Zealand Breakers
- 2005: West Sydney Razorbacks
- 2005: New Zealand Breakers
- 2006–2007: Wollongong Hawks
- 2007–2009: Gold Coast Blaze
- 2010–2013: Wellington Saints
- 2014: New Zealand Breakers
- 2014: Waikato Pistons
- 2015: Super City Rangers
- 2016: Wellington Saints

Career highlights
- 4× NZNBL champion (2004, 2005, 2010, 2011); 2× NZNBL Kiwi MVP (2006, 2008); 3× NZNBL All-Star Five (2005, 2006, 2008); 3× NZNBL Most Outstanding Forward (2005, 2006, 2008); 2× NZNBL Most Outstanding Kiwi Forward/Centre (2006, 2008); 2× First-team All-Big Sky (1998, 1999)
Medals
Men's basketball
Representing New Zealand
Commonwealth Games
Silver medal – second place	2006 Melbourne	Team competition

Casey Frank (born October 23, 1977) is an American-New Zealand former professional basketball player. He played college basketball for the Northern Arizona Lumberjacks before playing in New Zealand and Australia between 2002 and 2016. He was a regular member of the New Zealand Tall Blacks.

== Early life ==
Frank was born in Port Jefferson, New York. He attended North High School in Phoenix, Arizona, where he was named as one of the ten all-time greatest boys basketball players in 2015.

== College career ==
Between 1995 and 1999, Frank played college basketball for the Northern Arizona Lumberjacks. In 106 career games, he averaged 10.0 points, 5.6 rebounds and 1.2 assists in 22.7 minutes per game. He was named to the All-Big Sky Conference first team in 1997–98 and 1998–99.

== Professional career ==
Frank began his professional career in France, playing as an injury replacement for Paris SG during the 1999–2000 LNB Pro A season.

For the 2000–01 season, Frank joined the La Crosse Bobcats of the Continental Basketball Association. In nine games, he averaged 4.7 points, 5.3 rebounds and 1.8 assists per game.

For the 2001–02 season, Frank moved to Sweden to play for Sallen Basket in the Basketligan. In 32 games, he averaged 15.3 points, 8.7 rebounds, 2.3 assists and 1.8 steals per game.

Following the conclusion of the Swedish season, Frank joined the Auckland Stars for the 2002 New Zealand NBL season. He continued with the Stars in 2003.

Frank joined the inaugural New Zealand Breakers team for their debut in the Australian NBL in the 2003–04 season. He was released in November 2003 after appearing in 12 games.

In 2004 and 2005, Frank helped the Stars win back-to-back New Zealand NBL championships. He was named All-Star Five and Most Outstanding Forward in 2005.

In September 2005, Frank had a three-game stint with the West Sydney Razorbacks as an injury replacement for the start of the 2005–06 NBL season. In November 2005, he had a two-game stint with the New Zealand Breakers also as an injury replacement.

With the Stars in 2006, Frank was named Kiwi MVP, All-Star Five, Most Outstanding Forward and Most Outstanding Kiwi Forward/Centre.

Frank played for the Wollongong Hawks in the 2006–07 NBL season and then played his sixth season with the Stars in 2007. During the 2007 season, Frank had a notable stoush with Wellington Saints' American import Bakari Hendrix in the players' tunnel.

Frank played for the Gold Coast Blaze in the 2007–08 NBL season. With the Stars in 2008, he was again named Kiwi MVP, All-Star Five, Most Outstanding Forward and Most Outstanding Kiwi Forward/Centre. He then returned to the Blaze for the 2008–09 NBL season.

After playing his eighth season for the Stars in 2009, Frank had a three-game stint with the Blaze in November and December 2009.

Between 2010 and 2013, Frank played for the Wellington Saints in the New Zealand NBL. He won back-to-back championships with the Saints in 2010 and 2011.

On 8 January 2014, Frank signed with the New Zealand Breakers as an injury replacement for Alex Pledger. In 13 games in the 2013–14 NBL season, he averaged 5.8 points, 2.8 rebounds and 1.6 assists per game.

After playing for the Waikato Pistons in 2014 and the Super City Rangers in 2015, Frank played his final season in the New Zealand NBL in 2016 for the Wellington Saints, playing only seven games before leaving mid season.

In April 2021, Frank was named as the 22nd ranked player for the New Zealand NBL's list of the top 40 players to celebrate 40 years of being a league.

== National team career ==
Frank debuted for the New Zealand Tall Blacks in China in 2005 and gained New Zealand citizenship for inclusion in the 2006 Commonwealth Games silver medal team. He played for the Tall Blacks at the 2006 FIBA World Championship, 2007 FIBA Oceania Championship, 2009 FIBA Oceania Championship, 2010 FIBA World Championship, 2011 FIBA Oceania Championship, 2012 FIBA World Olympic Qualifying Tournament, 2013 FIBA Oceania Championship, and 2014 FIBA World Cup. He played 120 games for the Tall Blacks.

== Film career ==
Frank appeared in the 2005 film The Chronicles of Narnia: The Lion, the Witch and the Wardrobe and the 2016 Bollywood film Mohenjo Daro.

Frank featured in Celebrity Treasure Island 2021, where he was the first to be voted off.

== Personal life ==
Frank's wife is South African-born actress, Mia Pistorius.

In August 2013, Frank graduated with a Master of Business Administration (MBA).

As of July 2023, Frank was a basketball commentator and the New Zealand NBL's marketing and media manager.
