= 2003 FIBA Oceania Championship =

FIBA Oceania Championship 2003
16th FIBA Oceanian Basketball Championship

Tournament details
- Host country: Australia
- Dates: September 1 – September 4
- Teams: 2 (from 21 federations)
- Venues: 3 (in 3 host cities)

Final positions
- Champions: Australia (14th title)

The FIBA Oceania Championship for Men 2003 was the qualifying tournament of FIBA Oceania for the 2004 Summer Olympics. The tournament, a best-of-three series between Australia and New Zealand, was held in Bendigo, Geelong and Melbourne. Australia won all three games to qualify for the Oceanic spot in the Olympics.

== Teams that did not enter ==
- American Samoa
- Cook Islands
- Federated States of Micronesia
- Fiji
- Guam
- Kiribati
- Marshall Islands
- Nauru
- New Caledonia
- Norfolk Island
- Northern Mariana Islands
- Palau
- Papua New Guinea
- Samoa
- Solomon Islands
- Tahiti
- Tonga
- Tuvalu
- Vanuatu

== Venues ==
2003 FIBA Oceania Championship (Victoria)	Melbourne	Bendigo	Geelong
2003 FIBA Oceania Championship (Victoria)	State Netball and Hockey Centre	Bendigo Stadium	Geelong Arena
2003 FIBA Oceania Championship (Victoria)	Capacity: 3,500	Capacity: 2,000	Capacity: 2,000

== Results ==
September 1
7:30 p.m.

Report

Australia	79–66	New Zealand
Scoring by quarter: 25-14, 19-11, 16-21, 19-20
Pts: Anthony Ronaldson 19; Rebs: Chris Anstey 9 Asts: Shane Heal 7		Pts: Kirk Penney 22; Rebs: Pero Cameron 9 Asts: Phillip Jones 5

September 3
7:30 p.m.

Report

New Zealand	76–90	Australia
Scoring by quarter: 21-17, 22-22, 13-25, 20-26
Pts: Phillip Jones 14; Rebs: Mark Dickel 10; Asts: Tony Rampton 5		Pts: Shane Heal 32; Rebs: Shane Heal 6 Asts: Shane Heal 6

September 4
7:30 p.m.

Report

Australia	84–75	New Zealand
Scoring by quarter: 24-20, 21-19, 22-16, 17-20
Pts: Matt Nielsen 25; Rebs: Sam Mackinnon 13; Asts: Shane Heal 7		Pts: Phillip Jones 14; Rebs: Tony Rampton 7 Asts: Penney and Dickel 3
Australia wins series, 3-0

2003 Oceanian champions

Australia
Fourteenth title
