= Kyle Husslein =

Guamanian-American basketball player (born 1995)

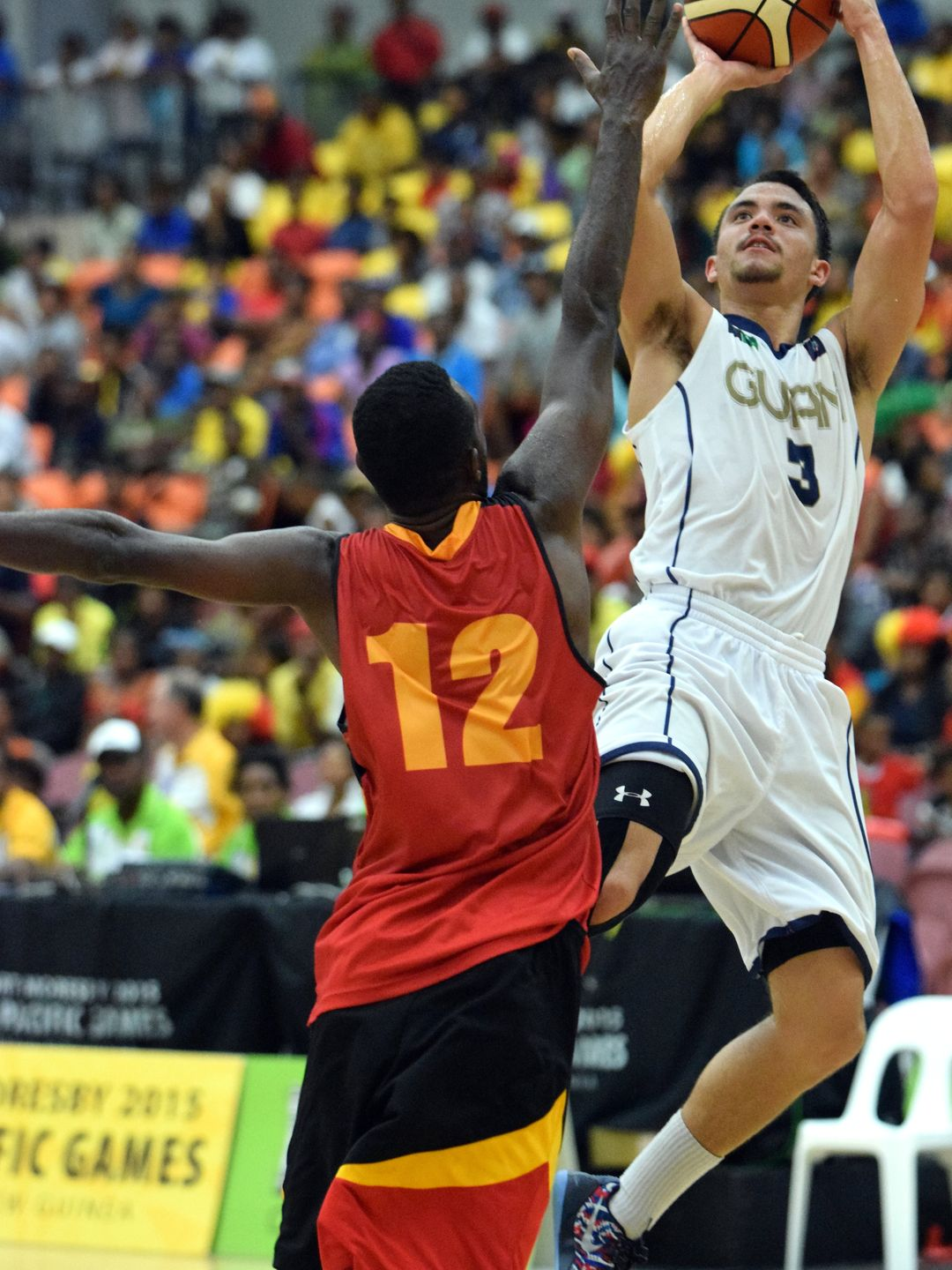
- Husslein (3) playing for Guam at the 2015 Pacific Games.

Personal information
- Born: November 6, 1995 (age 31) Tamuning, Guam
- Listed height: 6 ft 2 in (1.88 m)
- Listed weight: 185 lb (84 kg)

Career information
- High school: Christ School (Arden, North Carolina); Mid-Pacific (Honolulu, Hawaii)
- College: Redlands (2014–2018)
- NBA draft: 2018: undrafted
- Position: Point guard / shooting guard
Medals
Representing Guam
Men's basketball
Micronesian Games
Gold medal – first place	2014 Pohnpei	National Team
Pacific Games
Gold medal – first place	2015 Port Moresby	National Team

Kyle Edward Husslein (born November 6, 1995) is a Guamanian-American basketball player who played college basketball for the University of Redlands. Born in Guam, he has played high school basketball for Christ School and Mid-Pacific. Husslein has represented Guam at senior level, winning the gold medal at the 2014 Micronesian Games and the 2015 Pacific Games.

== Early life and career ==
Husslein was born in Tamuning, Guam, and as a youngster he played for the Tamuning Typhoons. In 2009 he transferred to Arden, North Carolina–based Christ School, where along with basketball he competed in cross country and track and field. While at Christ School, Husslein also played AAU basketball for the Carolina Kings. In the summer of 2011, he participated in the training camp of IMG Academy where he was recognized as the IMG total athlete of the week with the Gatorade Standout Award. In 2013 Husslein transferred to Mid-Pacific to compete for the varsity team. In his senior season he earned Mid-Pacific's Most Outstanding Athlete Award, Tri-Athlete Award and basketball team MVP Award. At the same time he played AAU basketball for Off the Bench, with whom he scored 12 points in the championship game against Kuhio Park Terrace.

== College career ==
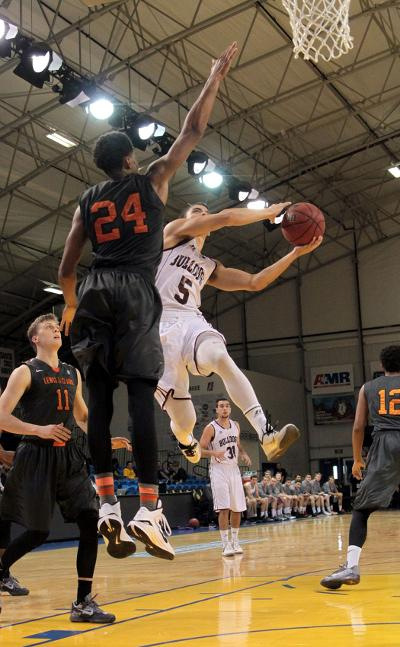
Husslein (5) plays basketball for the Redlands Bulldogs since 2014.

After considering other scholarship offers, Husslein enrolled in the University of Redlands. In his debut for Redlands, an exhibition game against Concordia University Irvine, he managed to score 6 points in 10 minutes playing time. On February 17, 2015, Husslein scored a season high 14 points to help his team win 62–59 over Chapman, also adding 4 rebounds and 1 steal.

As a sophomore, Husslein reached double digits four games into the season, scoring 18 to help his team get past Linfield 87–79. Versus La Verne, he scored a career high 20 points, also making 4 free throws in the final seconds of the game, to help his team win 76–72. He tied his season high in scoring against Caltech, grabbed 5 rebounds, gave 3 assists and sealed his team's 75–71 victory by scoring the final two free throws.

=== College statistics ===
Legend
GP	Games played	GS	Games started	MPG	Minutes per game
FG%	Field goal percentage	3P%	3-point field goal percentage	FT%	Free throw percentage
RPG	Rebounds per game	APG	Assists per game	SPG	Steals per game
BPG	Blocks per game	PPG	Points per game	**Bold**	Career high

Year	Team	GP	GS	MPG	FG%	3P%	FT%	RPG	APG	SPG	BPG	PPG
2014–15	Redlands	21	0	8.2	.341	.167	.600	1.5	.3	.4	.0	2.0
2015–16	Redlands	**27**	**27**	**23.4**	**.457**	**.365**	**.774**	**2.1**	**1.4**	**.9**	**.1**	**10.2**
Career		48	27	16.8	.438	.321	.735	1.9	.9	.7	.0	6.6

== International career ==
Following tryouts for the Guam national basketball team in March 2014, Husslein appeared in the 2014 Micronesian Games where his team won the gold medal. Husslein was selected to compete for Guam at the 2015 Pacific Games. As the youngest player on the team, he came off the bench to play the shooting guard. Husslein nearly achieved a double-double in Guam's victory against Kiribati, with 20 points and 9 assists. Guam won the gold medal in the tournament, with Husslein contributing 71 points, 15 rebounds and 11 steals.
