= 2001 FIBA Oceania Championship =

Basketball championship

FIBA Oceania Championship 2001
15th FIBA Oceanian Basketball Championship

Tournament details
- Host country: New Zealand
- Dates: September 21 – September 23
- Teams: 2 (from 21 federations)
- Venues: 3 (in 3 host cities)

Final positions
- Champions: New Zealand (2nd title)

The FIBA Oceania Championship for Men 2001 was the qualifying tournament of FIBA Oceania for the 2002 FIBA World Championship. The tournament, a best-of-three series between Australia and New Zealand, was held in Auckland, Wellington and Hamilton. New Zealand won the series 2–1 to claim its second Oceania Championship and first championship that Australia also participated in.

== Teams that did not enter ==
- American Samoa
- Cook Islands
- Federated States of Micronesia
- Fiji
- Guam
- Kiribati
- Marshall Islands
- Nauru
- New Caledonia
- Norfolk Island
- Northern Mariana Islands
- Palau
- Papua New Guinea
- Samoa
- Solomon Islands
- Tahiti
- Tonga
- Tuvalu
- Vanuatu

== Results ==
September 21
7:30 p.m.

Report

New Zealand	85–78	Australia
Scoring by quarter: 28-15, 25-29, 15-24, 18-10

September 22
7:00 p.m.

Report

Australia	81–79 (OT)	New Zealand
Scoring by quarter: 18-18, 22-23, 15-19, 15-10, Overtime: 11-9

September 23
1:00 p.m.

Report

Australia	78–89	New Zealand
Scoring by quarter: 29-21, 22-24, 16-25, 11-19
New Zealand wins series, 2-1

2001 Oceanian champions

New Zealand
Second title

- New Zealand qualified for the 2002 FIBA World Championship.
