= 2007 FIBA Oceania Championship =

FIBA Oceania Championship 2007
18th FIBA Oceanian Basketball Championship

Tournament details
- Host country: Australia
- Dates: 20–24 August
- Teams: 2
- Venue(s): 3 (in 3 host cities)

Final positions
- Champions: Australia (16th title)

The FIBA Oceania Championship for Men 2007 was the qualifying tournament of FIBA Oceania for the men's basketball tournament at the 2008 Summer Olympics at Beijing. The tournament, a best-of-three series between Australia and New Zealand, was held in Melbourne, Sydney and Brisbane. Australia won the first two games to qualify for the Olympics, while New Zealand won the third game and took part in the FIBA wildcard tournament.

== Venues ==
2007 FIBA Oceania Championship (Australia)	Melbourne	Sydney	Brisbane
2007 FIBA Oceania Championship (Australia)	Vodafone Arena	Sydney Entertainment Centre	Brisbane Entertainment Centre
2007 FIBA Oceania Championship (Australia)	Capacity: 10,500	Capacity: 10,517	Capacity: 13,500

== Teams that did not enter ==
- American Samoa
- Cook Islands
- Micronesia
- Fiji
- Guam
- Kiribati
- Marshall Islands
- Nauru
- New Caledonia
- Norfolk Island
- Northern Mariana Islands
- Palau
- Papua New Guinea
- Samoa
- Solomon Islands
- Tahiti
- Tonga
- Tuvalu
- Vanuatu

== Results ==
20 August
7:30 p.m.

Australia	79–67	New Zealand
Scoring by quarter: 18-16, 25-21, 16-9, 20-21
Pts: Sam Mackinnon 18; Rebs: Sam Mackinnon 7 Asts: David Andersen 4		Pts: Kirk Penney 20; Rebs: Tait, Cameron 5 each Asts: Pero Cameron 5

Melbourne Arena, Melbourne, Victoria
Attendance: 6,053
Referees: Vaughan Mayberry, Andy Thackray, Romualdas Brazauskas

22 August
7:30 p.m.

New Zealand	67–93	Australia
Scoring by quarter: 17-25, 25-16, 9-28, 16-24
Pts: Kirk Penney 21; Rebs: Penney, Cameron 7 Asts: 3 tied 3		Pts: Patrick Mills 17; Rebs: Sam Mackinnon 6 Asts: Glen Saville 4

Sydney Entertainment Centre, Sydney, New South Wales
Attendance: 4,517
Referees: Vaughan Mayberry, Andy Thackray, Romualdas Brazauskas

24 August
7:30 p.m.

Australia	58–67	New Zealand
Scoring by quarter: 12-18, 12-10, 21-13, 13-26
Pts: Brad Newley 14; Rebs: Brad Newley 6 Asts: Sam Mackinnon 3		Pts: Phill Jones 17; Rebs: Phill Jones 12; Asts: Pero Cameron 6
Australia wins series, 2-1

Brisbane Entertainment Centre, Brisbane, Queensland
Attendance: 3,537
Referees: Vaughan Mayberry, Andy Thackray, Romualdas Brazauskas

2007 Oceanian champions

Australia
Sixteenth title
