= Corey Webster (basketball) =

New Zealand basketball player (born 1988)

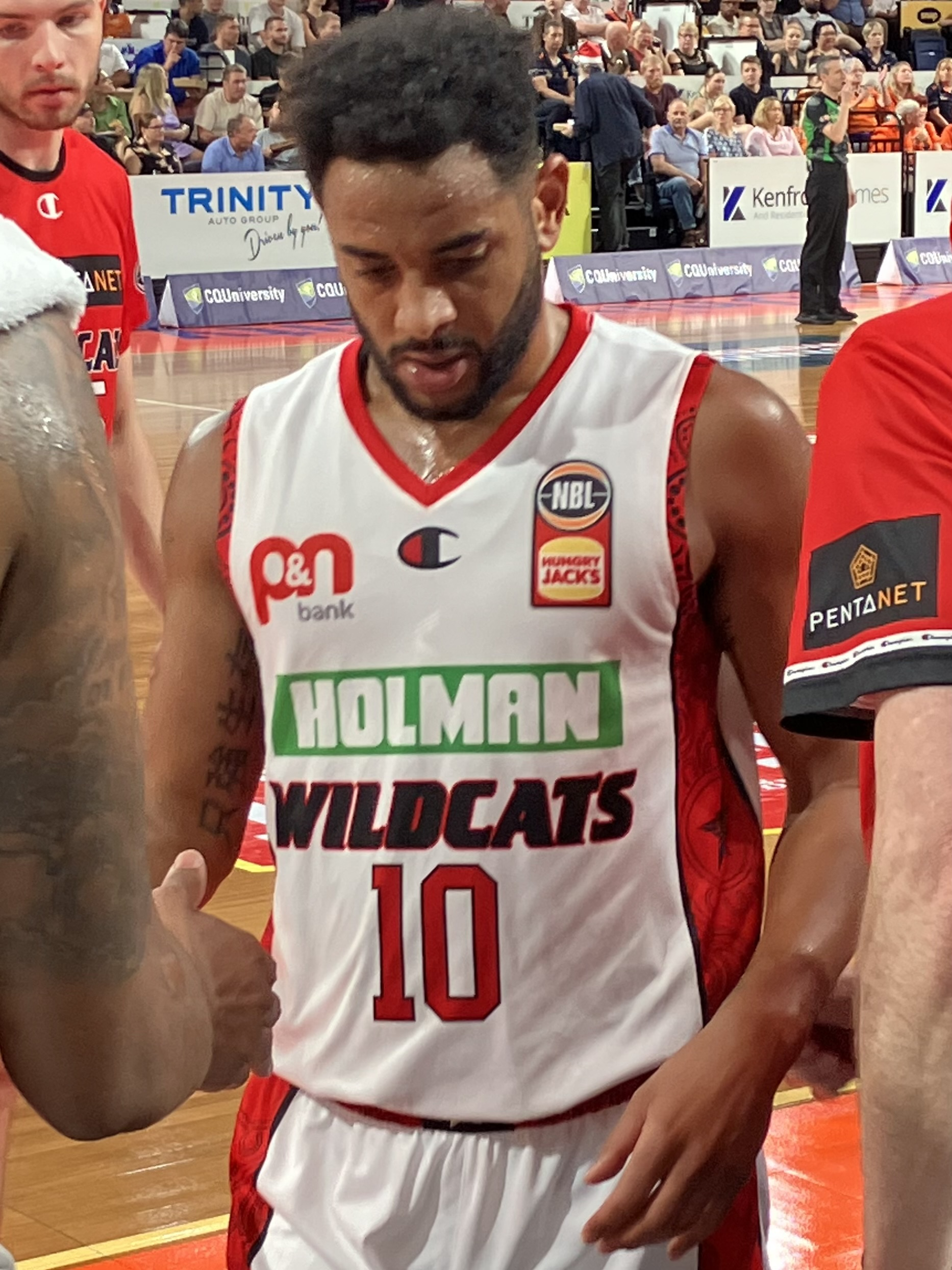
- Webster with the Perth Wildcats in 2022

Free agent
- Position: Shooting guard / point guard

Personal information
- Born: 29 November 1988 (age 37) Auckland, New Zealand
- Listed height: 188 cm (6 ft 2 in)
- Listed weight: 89 kg (196 lb)

Career information
- High school: Westlake Boys (Auckland, New Zealand)
- College: Lambuth (2007–2008)
- NBA draft: 2010: undrafted
- Playing career: 2008–present

Career history
- 2008–2011: New Zealand Breakers
- 2009–2010: Harbour Heat
- 2011: Wellington Saints
- 2012–2017: New Zealand Breakers
- 2013–2014: Wellington Saints
- 2015: Mega Leks
- 2016: Koroivos
- 2016: Super City Rangers
- 2017: Wellington Saints
- 2017–2018: Ironi Nahariya
- 2018: Guizhou
- 2018–2019: New Zealand Breakers
- 2019–2020: Zhejiang Lions
- 2020: Virtus Roma
- 2020–2021: New Zealand Breakers
- 2021–2022: Al Ittihad
- 2022: Franklin Bulls
- 2022–2024: Perth Wildcats
- 2023: KK Mornar Bar
- 2023: Al Ahly
- 2023: Canterbury Rams
- 2024: Auckland Tuatara
- 2025–2026: Manawatu Jets
- 2026: Adelaide 36ers

Career highlights
- BAL champion (2023); 3× NBL champion (2011, 2013, 2015); 4× NZNBL champion (2011, 2014, 2017, 2023); 2× NZNBL MVP (2014, 2017); 2× NZNBL All-Star Five (2014, 2017); NZNBL scoring champion (2017); NZNBL assist champion (2024); All-NBL Second Team (2016); TSAC Freshman of the Year (2008); TSAC All-Freshman Team (2008)
- Stats at Basketball Reference

Corey Anthony Webster (born 29 November 1988) is a New Zealand professional basketball player who last played for the Adelaide 36ers of the Australian National Basketball League (NBL). He played one season of college basketball in the United States for Lambuth University before joining the New Zealand Breakers of the Australian NBL in 2008, where he won championships in 2011, 2013 and 2015.

He has also been a regular in the New Zealand National Basketball League (NZNBL), winning championships with the Wellington Saints in 2011, 2014 and 2017, and with the Canterbury Rams in 2023. He has had stints in Serbia, Greece, Israel, China, Italy and Egypt, winning the 2023 BAL championship with Al Ahly.

== Early life and college career ==
Webster was born in Auckland, New Zealand, in the suburb of Takapuna. He attended Westlake Boys High School, and played junior basketball for North Harbour Basketball Association.

== College career ==
Webster moved to the United States in 2007 and played a season of college basketball for Lambuth University of the NAIA. He averaged 11.5 points per game and was named the TSAC Freshman of the Year.

== Professional career ==
=== Australian NBL ===
==== New Zealand Breakers ====
In June 2008, Webster joined the New Zealand Breakers of the Australian NBL for the first time, signing as a development player. He spent two seasons as a development player before joining the full-time roster ahead of the 2010–11 season. He won his first championship with the Breakers that season before missing the 2011–12 season due to a drug violation. The Breakers brought him back on a three-year deal ahead of the 2012–13 season and won his second NBL championship that season. He averaged a then career-high 8.5 points per game during the 2013–14 season.

The 2014–15 season saw Webster develop into one of the league's premier scorers as he moved to a starting role and averaged a team-best 15.3 points per game, including scoring a career-high 24 points in the first semi-final against the Adelaide 36ers. He helped the Breakers win their fourth title in five years.

After re-signing with the Breakers on a three-year deal, Webster's 2015 off-season saw him attend a pre-draft tryout with the Indiana Pacers and later spent NBA preseason with the New Orleans Pelicans. With the Breakers in 2015–16, Webster scored a career-high 39 points in November and helped the team return to the NBL Grand Final series, where they lost to the Perth Wildcats. He earned All-NBL Second Team honours after he finished second in scoring with 21.09 points per game during the regular season.

After missing the second half of the 2016–17 NBL season due to a hip injury, Webster was released by the Breakers in March 2017. He subsequently played for the Dallas Mavericks during the 2017 NBA Summer League.

On 24 May 2018, Webster returned to the Breakers on another three-year deal. He started the 2018–19 NBL season strong, but had a form slump in December that saw him present as a shadow of the figure who was once a premier scorer in the league. He returned to form in the 2019–20 NBL season, averaging 19.5 points in 11 games, before being bought out of his contract in December in order to sign in China.

Webster re-joined the Breakers for the 2020–21 NBL season, but he missed the first two weeks of the season after slicing a nerve in his hand with a knife in his kitchen. He was later sidelined for four weeks with a knee injury.

On 20 August 2021, Webster parted ways with the Breakers.

==== Perth Wildcats ====
On 30 March 2017, Webster signed a two-year deal with the Perth Wildcats. However, he soon requested a release from his contract, which was granted by the Wildcats on 13 July 2017.

On 15 June 2022, Webster reunited with the Wildcats on a two-year deal. On 12 December 2022, in his 250th NBL game, he hit the game-winning 3-pointer to lift the Wildcats to a 90–89 win over Melbourne United.

On 3 May 2023, Webster re-signed with the Wildcats on a new two-year deal. After playing 27 minutes per game in 2022–23, he fell out of favour in 2023–24 to average 13 minutes per game. The Wildcats did not pick up their team option on his contract for the 2024–25 season.

==== Adelaide 36ers ====
On 6 October 2026, Webster signed with the Adelaide 36ers as an injury replacement. He parted ways with the 36ers on 20 November following Flynn Cameron's return.

=== New Zealand NBL ===
Webster debuted in the New Zealand NBL in 2009, playing two seasons for the Harbour Heat. In 2011, he joined the Wellington Saints and helped them win the championship. His second season with the Saints came in 2013. In 2014, he won the league MVP and another championship with the Saints. He spent the 2016 season with the Super City Rangers. In 2017 with the Saints, he won his second MVP award and third championship. In 2022, he played for the Franklin Bulls. He joined the Canterbury Rams in 2023 and won his fourth NZNBL championship. He joined the Auckland Tuatara for the 2024 season.

Webster joined the Manawatu Jets for the 2025 season. On 23 June 2025, he was ruled out for the rest of the season after he suffered a ruptured Achilles tendon in a game the previous day. He returned to the Jets for the 2026 season.

=== Overseas ===
Following both the 2014–15 and 2015–16 NBL seasons, Webster played in Europe. He played in Serbia in 2015 with Mega Leks and in Greece in 2016 with Koroivos.

Webster played the 2017–18 season in Israel for Ironi Nahariya. He won the Three-Point Shootout during the league's All-Star Event. Following the Israeli season, he joined the Guizhou Shenghang Snow Leopards of the Chinese NBL.

In December 2019, Webster returned to China to play for the Zhejiang Lions in the CBA. He played in seven games before leaving China on 3 February 2020 due to the COVID-19 pandemic. He moved to Italy later that month to play for Virtus Roma of the Lega Basket Serie A, but that season was also cut short due to the pandemic. He appeared in just one game for Roma.

Webster played the 2021–22 season in Egypt for Al Ittihad.

In February 2023, Webster joined KK Mornar Bar of the Montenegrin League for the rest of the 2022–23 season. He returned to Egypt in April 2023 and joined Al Ahly. He helped Al Ahly win the Basketball Africa League championship for the 2023 season. He scored 13 points in the 80–65 win over Douanes in the final.

== National team career ==
Webster joined the New Zealand national basketball team for the first time in 2008 at the FIBA Olympic Qualifying Tournament. He later played for New Zealand at the 2009 FIBA Oceania Championship, 2013 FIBA Oceania Championship, 2014 FIBA Basketball World Cup, 2015 FIBA Oceania Championship and 2019 FIBA Basketball World Cup.

Webster played for the Tall Blacks during the 2023 FIBA Basketball World Cup Asian qualifiers, 2024 FIBA Olympic Qualifying Tournament Greece, and 2025 FIBA Asia Cup qualifiers. He played his 100th game for the Tall Blacks in February 2025.

In August 2026, Webster was named in the Tall Blacks squad for the next window of the FIBA Basketball World Cup 2027 Asian Qualifiers. In November 2026, he was named in the squad for two more Asian qualifiers.

== Personal life ==
Webster is the son of Tony and Cherry Webster. Tony, who is from New York, was a standout basketball player in his own right, earning first-team All-WAC honours at Hawaii in 1983 and ranking fourth on Hawaii's career steals list before playing professionally in New Zealand. Webster's younger brother, Tai, played four years of college basketball for the University of Nebraska and has played professionally in New Zealand and Europe.

Webster holds dual citizenship with New Zealand and the United States.
