= 2005 FIBA Oceania Championship =

FIBA Oceania Championship 2005
17th FIBA Oceanian Basketball Championship

Tournament details
- Host country: New Zealand
- Dates: August 17 – August 21
- Teams: 2 (from 21 federations)
- Venues: 3 (in 3 host cities)

Final positions
- Champions: Australia (15th title)

The FIBA Oceania Championship for Men 2005 was the qualifying tournament of FIBA Oceania for the 2006 FIBA World Championship. The tournament, a best-of-three series between Australia and New Zealand, was held in Auckland and Dunedin. Australia won all three games. Both teams qualified for the 2006 FIBA World Championship.

== Teams that did not enter ==
- American Samoa
- Cook Islands
- Federated States of Micronesia
- Fiji
- Guam
- Kiribati
- Marshall Islands
- Nauru
- New Caledonia
- Norfolk Island
- Northern Mariana Islands
- Palau
- Papua New Guinea
- Samoa
- Solomon Islands
- Tahiti
- Tonga
- Tuvalu
- Vanuatu

== Venues ==
| 2005 FIBA Oceania Championship (New Zealand) | Waitakere | Manukau | Dunedin |
| 2005 FIBA Oceania Championship (New Zealand) | The Trusts Arena | TelstraClear Pacific Events Centre | Edgar Centre |
| 2005 FIBA Oceania Championship (New Zealand) | Capacity: 4,901 | Capacity: 3,000 | Capacity: 3,000 |

== Results ==
August 17
7:30 p.m.

Report

| New Zealand | 69–82 | Australia |
Scoring by quarter: 15-17, 16-25, 20-16, 18-24
| Pts: Olson and Jones 14 each Rebs: Jones, Cameron, and Rampton 5 each Asts: Dickel and Cameron 4 each | | Pts: C.J. Bruton 25; Rebs: Saville and Nielsen 8 each Asts: C.J. Bruton 6 |

The Trusts Arena, Henderson, Auckland

August 20
3:00 p.m.

Report

| Australia | 82–71 | New Zealand |
Scoring by quarter: 18-20, 16-9, 23-18, 25-24
| Pts: Glen Saville 20; Rebs: Matt Nielsen 10; Asts: Matt Nielsen 6 | | Pts: Pero Cameron 16; Rebs: Dillon Boucher 10; Asts: Tony Rampton 4 |

TelstraClear Pacific Events Centre, Manukau, Auckland

August 21
3:00 p.m.

Report

| New Zealand | 80–91 | Australia |
Scoring by quarter: 17-12, 22-22, 16-30, 25-27
| Pts: Phillip Jones 16; Rebs: Tony Rampton 8 Asts: Mark Dickel 5 | | Pts: Newley and Andersen 22; Rebs: David Andersen 6 Asts: Brad Davidson 6 |
Australia wins series, 3-0

Edgar Centre, Dunedin

2005 Oceanian champions

Australia
Fifteenth title
