= Husslein =

Husslein is a German surname. Notable people with the surname include:

- Kyle Husslein (born 1995), Guamanian-American basketball player
- Hermann Husslein (born 1985), German-Thai slalom canoeist

== See also ==
- Hussein
