= 2011 FIBA Oceania Championship =

FIBA Oceania Championship 2011
20th FIBA Oceanian Basketball Championship

Tournament details
- Host country: Australia
- Dates: 7–11 September
- Teams: 2 (from 1 federation)
- Venues: 3 (in 3 host cities)

Final positions
- Champions: Australia (17th title)

The 2011 FIBA Oceania Championship for Men was the 20th edition of the FIBA Oceania Championship. The tournament featured a three-game series between Australia and New Zealand. Game one was held in Melbourne followed by the second game in Brisbane and game three in Sydney, Australia.

== Venues ==
2011 FIBA Oceania Championship (Australia)	Melbourne	Brisbane	Sydney
2011 FIBA Oceania Championship (Australia)	State Netball and Hockey Centre	Brisbane Entertainment Centre	Sydney Entertainment Centre
2011 FIBA Oceania Championship (Australia)	Capacity: 3,500	Capacity: 13,500	Capacity: 10,517

== Results ==
One HD

7 September 2011
19:30

Report

Australia	91–78	New Zealand
Scoring by quarter: 26–18, 21–27, 26–13, 18–20
Pts: Mills 20; Rebs: Newley, Marić 8 Asts: Nielsen 6		Pts: Penney 30; Rebs: Vukona 12; Asts: Tait 6

State Netball and Hockey Centre, Melbourne
Referees: Jose Martin, Michael Aylen, Gavin Whiu

One HD

9 September 2011
19:30

Report

New Zealand	64–81	Australia
Scoring by quarter: 15–24, 19–12, 20–17, 10–28
Pts: Penney 17; Rebs: Penney 5 Asts: Penney 4		Pts: Newley 12; Rebs: Marić 8 Asts: Mills 4

Brisbane Entertainment Centre, Brisbane
Referees: Jose Martin, Tim Brown, Scott Butler

One HD

11 September 2011
16:00

Report

Australia	92–68	New Zealand
Scoring by quarter: 23–24, 22–17, 31–16, 16–7
Pts: Marić 27; Rebs: Marić 8 Asts: Ingles 6		Pts: Penney 27; Rebs: Frank 7 Asts: Penney 4
Australia wins series 3–0

Sydney Entertainment Centre, Sydney
