= Ryan Broekhoff =

Australian basketball player (born 1990)

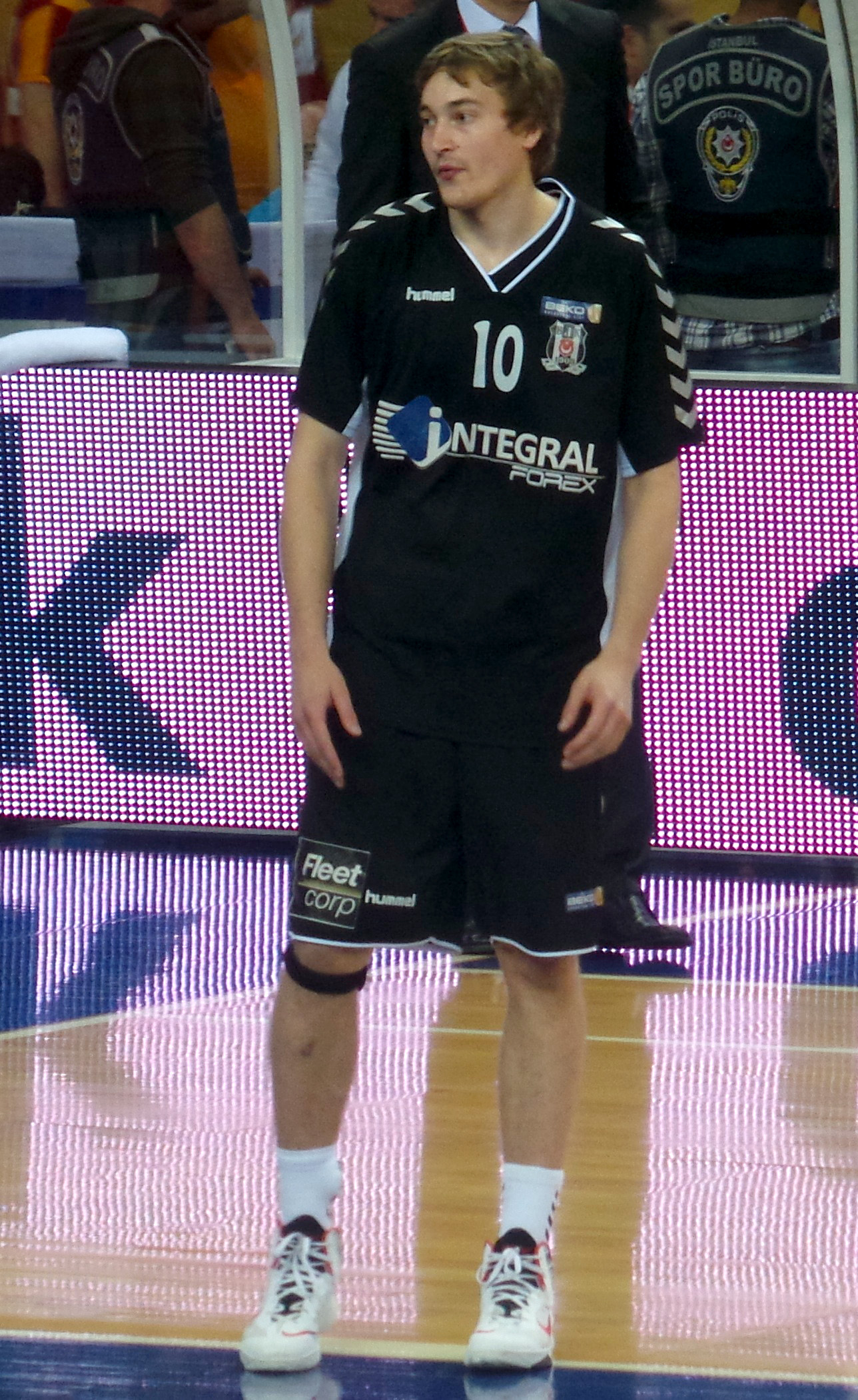
- Broekhoff with Beşiktaş in 2014

Personal information
- Born: 23 August 1990 (age 36) Melbourne, Victoria, Australia
- Listed height: 198 cm (6 ft 6 in)
- Listed weight: 95 kg (209 lb)

Career information
- High school: The Peninsula School (Melbourne, Victoria)
- College: Valparaiso (2009–2013)
- NBA draft: 2013: undrafted
- Playing career: 2008–2023
- Position: Shooting guard / small forward
- Number: 10, 45

Career history
- 2008–2009: Australian Institute of Sport
- 2013–2015: Beşiktaş
- 2015–2018: Lokomotiv Kuban
- 2018–2020: Dallas Mavericks
- 2021–2023: South East Melbourne Phoenix

Career highlights
- All-EuroCup First Team (2018); AP honourable mention All-American (2012); Horizon League Player of the Year (2012); 2× First-team All-Horizon League (2012, 2013)
- Stats at NBA.com
- Stats at Basketball Reference
Medals
Men's basketball
Representing Australia
Summer Universiade
| Silver medal – second place | 2013 Kazan | Team |

Ryan Broekhoff (born 23 August 1990) is an Australian former professional basketball player. He played college basketball for the Valparaiso Crusaders, where he was named an All-American in 2012. He represented the Australian Boomers on multiple occasions.

== Early life ==
Broekhoff was born in Melbourne, Victoria, in the suburb of Frankston. He grew up playing for the Frankston Blues as a junior. He attended The Peninsula School in Melbourne. In 2008 and 2009, he played in the South East Australian Basketball League (SEABL) for the Australian Institute of Sport.

== College career ==
Broekhoff played four years of college basketball for the Valparaiso Crusaders between 2009 and 2013. After playing a support role as a freshman in 2009–10, Broekhoff entered the starting line-up as a sophomore, averaging 10.3 points and 5.2 rebounds per game. He led the Horizon League in three-point field goal percentage at 44.8% and placed sixth in the conference in blocked shots with 1.1 per contest.

As a junior in 2011–12, Broekhoff became one of the top players in the Horizon League. He averaged 14.8 points, 8.6 rebounds (first in the Horizon League) and 2.3 assists per game and led the Crusaders to the conference regular-season title and a National Invitation Tournament bid. At the end of the season, he was named Horizon League Player of the Year and an honourable mention All-American by the Associated Press.

As a senior in 2012–13, Broekhoff averaged 15.7 points, 7.3 rebounds and 2.3 assists in 32.2 minutes per game. He led his team to a 26–7 record and the top seed in the Horizon League tournament. In the semi-final game against Green Bay-Wisconsin, he hit the game-winning shot to send Valparaiso to the title game. The Crusaders won the title game against Wright State and clinched an NCAA Tournament berth, where they lost in the first game.

== Professional career ==
=== Turkey and Russia (2013–2018) ===
Between 2013 and 2015, Broekhoff played for Beşiktaş of the Turkish Basketball League (TBL).

Broekhoff played for the Denver Nuggets in the 2015 NBA Summer League.

Between 2015 and 2018, Broekhoff played for PBC Lokomotiv Kuban of the VTB United League. In 16 VTB United League games in 2017–18, he averaged 8.1 points, 4.0 rebounds, 1.1 assists and 1.1 steals per game. In 16 EuroCup games, he averaged 12.3 points, 5.5 rebounds and 1.3 assists en route to earning All-EuroCup First Team honours.

=== Dallas Mavericks (2018–2020) ===
On 6 August 2018, Broekhoff signed with the Dallas Mavericks. He played in 42 games during the 2018–19 NBA season. On 23 March 2019, he scored a season-high 17 points against the Golden State Warriors. He returned to the Mavericks for the 2019–20 NBA season, but was waived on 11 February 2020. He played in 17 games in his second season.

Broekhoff initially signed with the Philadelphia 76ers in June 2020 for the NBA's 2019–20 season restart, but ultimately did not join the team in the Orlando bubble. He re-joined the 76ers in November 2020 but was released after training camp in mid December prior to the start of the 2020–21 NBA season.

=== South East Melbourne Phoenix (2021–2023) ===
On 15 February 2021, Broekhoff signed with the South East Melbourne Phoenix for the remainder of the 2020–21 NBL season. He averaged 7.5 points and 3.5 rebounds per game.

On 28 June 2021, Broekhoff re-signed with the Phoenix on a two-year contract. He sustained a shoulder injury in March 2022 that ruled him out for four weeks.

A hip complaint kept Broekhoff out for an extended period early in the 2022–23 NBL season, and in January 2023, he suffered a groin injury that ruled him out for the rest of the regular season.

On 12 July 2023, Broekhoff announced his retirement from basketball.

== National team career ==
Broekhoff was a member of Australia's entry in both the 2009 FIBA Under-19 World Championship in Auckland, New Zealand, and the 2011 Summer Universiade in Shenzhen, China. He continued his career with the national basketball program in 2012 as he was invited to the trials for the Australia's 2012 London Olympic team. Broekhoff was one of the last cuts on the squad, making the final 14 before being released.

In 2013, Broekhoff competed in the 2013 Stanković Cup and World University Games, winning gold and silver, respectively. In August 2013, he was named in the Boomers' 2013 FIBA Oceania Championship squad to take on New Zealand in a two-game series.

Broekhoff was named in the Australian squad for the 2014 FIBA Basketball World Cup. He impressed coach Andrej Lemanis during several warm-up games and subsequently earned a place in the starting lineup during the tournament. Broekhoff returned to the Boomers' starting line-up for the two-game FIBA Oceania Championship series against New Zealand in August 2015.

Broekhoff was part of the Australian men's squad at the 2016 Rio Olympics. He opted out of the 2020 Tokyo Olympics due to mental health issues.

== Career statistics ==
Legend
| GP | Games played | GS | Games started | MPG | Minutes per game |
| FG% | Field-goal percentage | 3P% | 3-point field-goal percentage | FT% | Free-throw percentage |
| RPG | Rebounds per game | APG | Assists per game | SPG | Steals per game |
| BPG | Blocks per game | PPG | Points per game | PIR | Performance index rating |
| **Bold** | Career high |

=== NBA ===
==== Regular season ====
| Year | Team | GP | GS | MPG | FG% | 3P% | FT% | RPG | APG | SPG | BPG | PPG |
|---|---|---|---|---|---|---|---|---|---|---|---|---|
| 2018–19 | Dallas | **42** | 0 | **10.8** | **.452** | **.409** | .789 | 1.5 | .5 | .1 | .1 | 4.0 |
| 2019–20 | Dallas | 17 | **1** | 10.6 | .373 | .392 | **.875** | **2.5** | **.6** | **.3** | **.2** | **4.2** |
| Career | | 59 | 1 | 10.7 | .427 | .403 | .815 | 1.8 | .6 | .2 | .1 | 4.0 |

=== EuroLeague ===
| * | Led the league |

| Year | Team | GP | GS | MPG | FG% | 3P% | FT% | RPG | APG | SPG | BPG | PPG | PIR |
|---|---|---|---|---|---|---|---|---|---|---|---|---|---|
| 2015–16 | Lokomotiv Kuban | 31* | 31* | 25.3 | .489 | .472 | .868 | 3.4 | 1.6 | 1.0 | .1 | 8.5 | 9.6 |
| Career | | 31 | 31 | 25.3 | .489 | .472 | .868 | 3.4 | 1.6 | 1.0 | .1 | 8.5 | 9.6 |

== Personal life ==
Broekhoff had his first child in July 2023.
