= Cameron Bairstow =

Australian basketball player (born 1990)

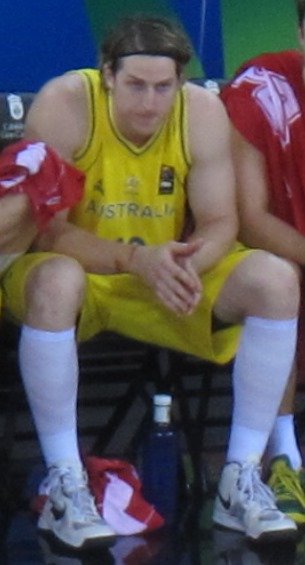
- Bairstow in 2014

Personal information
- Born: 7 December 1990 (age 35) Brisbane, Queensland, Australia
- Listed height: 6 ft 9 in (2.06 m)
- Listed weight: 250 lb (113 kg)

Career information
- High school: Runcorn State (Brisbane, Queensland); Anglican Church Grammar School (Brisbane, Queensland)
- College: New Mexico (2010–2014)
- NBA draft: 2014: 2nd round, 49th overall pick
- Drafted by: Chicago Bulls
- Playing career: 2009–2022
- Position: Power forward / center

Career history
- 2009–2010: Australian Institute of Sport
- 2014–2016: Chicago Bulls
- 2015: →Austin Spurs
- 2016–2019: Brisbane Bullets
- 2019–2020: Rytas Vilnius
- 2020–2021: Illawarra Hawks
- 2021–2022: Adelaide 36ers

Career highlights
- First-team All-Mountain West (2014); Mountain West tournament MVP (2014)
- Stats at NBA.com
- Stats at Basketball Reference
Medals
Men's basketball
Representing Australia
Summer Universiade
Silver medal – second place	2013 Kazan	Team

Cameron David Bairstow (born 7 December 1990) is an Australian former professional basketball player. He played college basketball for the University of New Mexico before being drafted 49th overall in the 2014 NBA draft by the Chicago Bulls. He spent two seasons with the Bulls before playing five of next six years in the National Basketball League (NBL).

== Early years ==
Bairstow was born in Brisbane, Australia, in the suburb of Sunnybank. He attended Runcorn State High School before graduating from Anglican Church Grammar School in 2008. His parents are Ian and Penny Bairstow, a veterinarian and a school teacher, who both also coach youth basketball in Australia. Bairstow is the third of seven children, with four brothers (Kieran, Jarred, Daniel, and Sean) and two sisters (Melissa and Stephanie). Three of his siblings have also played college basketball: brother Jarred at the University of Central Oklahoma, sister Stephanie at Utah State University, and brother Sean at Utah State University.

Bairstow played for the South West Metro Pirates and Brisbane Capitals youth teams before attending the Australian Institute of Sport (AIS) in Canberra in 2009 and 2010. He played two seasons with the AIS men's team in the South East Australian Basketball League (SEABL), and in 2010, he was a member of the SEABL Select Team that visited Qatar. He was also on the Queensland team that won the 2009 Under 20 Australian national championship, and he played on the Australian Under 19 team that won the 2009 FIBA Oceania title in Saipan.

Considered a two-star recruit by ESPN.com, Bairstow was listed as the No. 196 power forward in the nation in 2010.

== College career ==
=== Freshman season ===
Following the 2010 SEABL season, Bairstow moved to the United States to attend the University of New Mexico. In his freshman season, the young Lobo squad was led by senior Dairese Gary and transfer Drew Gordon and finished the year 22–13 with an appearance in the NIT. Bairstow was a member of one of the most accomplished freshman recruiting classes in Lobo history, along with Kendall Williams, Tony Snell and Alex Kirk. He appeared in 31 games but played sparingly, averaging 2.6 points and 1.8 rebounds in 9.7 minutes per game.

=== Sophomore season ===
As a sophomore, Bairstow became a regular rotation player, appearing in 34 games, averaging 3.7 points and 3.6 rebounds in 15.4 minutes per game. Fellow Australian Hugh Greenwood joined the Lobos as a freshman in 2011–12 – he and Bairstow were teammates at the AIS in 2009 and 2010. Gordon had a dominating senior season, while Williams and Snell each averaged in double figures. The Lobos finished the season 28–7 after earning a share of the regular season Mountain West Conference (MWC) title, winning the conference tournament championship, and appearing in the NCAA tournament.

=== Junior season ===
In Bairstow's junior season, 2012–13, the Lobos jumped out to a 12–0 start against a difficult schedule and climbed into the national rankings, later peaking at No. 10. The team's offence struggled at times, leading to a couple of blowout losses, and Bairstow was inserted into the starting line-up in late January. The Lobos then won nine of ten and clinched the regular season MWC title. Bairstow played in all 35 games and averaged 9.7 points and 5.9 rebounds in 24.1 minutes per game. His numbers climbed to 12 points and seven rebounds a game after he became a starter. Williams, Snell and Kirk all averaged in double figures. The Lobos won the MWC tournament championship, and Bairstow was named to the all-tournament team after averaging 13 points and 8.7 rebounds. The team suffered a disappointing upset to Harvard in the NCAA tournament, finishing the season 29–6, but Bairstow was one of the bright spots for the Lobos, tallying 15 points and 9 rebounds.

=== Senior season ===
Bairstow had a break-out season as a senior in 2013–14, recording one of the most remarkable improvements ever by a Lobo player. In 34 games, he averaged 20.4 points, 7.4 rebounds, 1.6 assists and 1.5 blocks per game, scoring 20 points or more in 21 games. The increase in his scoring average of 10.7 points was the third best in school history, and he is the first Lobo player to average less than ten points one season and over twenty the next. The Lobos finished second in the MWC but won the conference tournament championship for the third straight season, and Bairstow was named tournament MVP. The team was again upset in the NCAA tournament, by Stanford, despite 24 points and eight rebounds by Bairstow. The Lobos completed the season 27–7, giving them a combined record of 106–33 during Bairstow's four years, making his the second-winningest class ever for the program. Bairstow was named to the All-MWC first team after leading the conference in points scored, points per game, field goals made and attempted, field goal percentage, free throws made and attempted, and Player Efficiency Rating. He was honoured as a Second Team All-American by Sports Illustrated, Third Team All-American by NBC Sports and CBS Sports, and Honorable Mention All-American by the Associated Press.

Bairstow gained attention during his senior season for his ritual of going to the weight room to lift after games, while still in uniform, receiving praise from opposing coaches and the media for his commitment and work ethic. When he arrived at New Mexico, he measured 6–8 and 210 pounds; by his senior season he was listed as 6–9 and 250 pounds; at the NBA Draft Combine in May 2014, he surprised observers by measuring just under 6–10, suggesting he had still been growing. Bairstow was arguably the most improved player in the history of the Lobo program. Head coach Craig Neal stated, "I don't think there's anybody who's come farther in four years. I don't think there's anybody who could have predicted what he's done this season."

After his success in international play during the summer of 2013, Bairstow received offers to play professionally, but he chose to return for his senior season and complete his degree. He was honoured by the MWC as academic all-conference as a senior and earned a degree in Exercise Science at UNM; he aspires to study physiotherapy after his playing career has ended.

== Professional career ==
=== Chicago Bulls (2014–2016) ===
Bairstow was selected by the Chicago Bulls with the 49th overall pick in the 2014 NBA draft, and subsequently signed a three-year contract with the Bulls, with one and a half years guaranteed. He made his NBA debut on 29 October 2014 in the Bulls' season opener against the New York Knicks, recording one turnover and missing his only field goal attempt in three and half minutes. He appeared in 18 of the Bulls' 82 regular-season games, making one start. In his one start on 25 November against the Denver Nuggets, he played a season-high 18 minutes and 46 seconds and had two points, two rebounds, one assist and one block, but also accumulated four fouls and two turnovers and made just one of four field goal attempts. He failed to appear in any of the Bulls' 12 playoff games.

The 2015–16 season saw Bairstow once again appear in just 18 regular-season games, while making two starts. He played in five games on assignment with the Austin Spurs in the NBA Development League between 22 November and 7 December. On 2 March 2016, he scored a career-high eight points in 10 minutes as a starter in a 102–89 loss to the Orlando Magic.

On 17 June 2016, Bairstow was traded to the Detroit Pistons in exchange for Spencer Dinwiddie. He was waived by the Pistons on 10 July 2016.

=== Brisbane Bullets (2016–2019) ===
On 18 July 2016, Bairstow signed with his hometown team, the Brisbane Bullets of the National Basketball League. Due to a shoulder injury he sustained while playing for the Boomers at the Rio Olympics, Bairstow missed the Bullets' entire preseason schedule, as well as the first two games of the regular season. In his NBL debut on 16 October, Bairstow recorded 15 points, seven rebounds and three assists off the bench in a 96–93 overtime loss to the Adelaide 36ers. On 20 December, he was ruled out for the rest of the season after scans revealed an anterior cruciate ligament injury to his left knee. He suffered the injury during overtime in Brisbane's 91–85 loss to the Illawarra Hawks the previous night. Having never previously suffered a serious injury, Bairstow had now copped two in the space of six months, including a career-threatening knee injury. In 13 games over the first two months of the 2016–17 season, he averaged 12.8 points and 6.5 rebounds per game.

After missing the entire 2017–18 season with the injury, Bairstow re-signed with the Bullets on a two-year deal on 4 May 2018. He returned to action in the 2018–19 season. In March 2019, the Bullets elected not to take up the option on Bairstow's contract.

=== Rytas Vilnius (2019–2020) ===
On 25 July 2019, Bairstow signed with Lithuanian team Rytas Vilnius.

=== Illawarra Hawks (2020–2021) ===
On 4 August 2020, Bairstow signed with the Illawarra Hawks for the 2020–21 NBL season, returning to the league for a second stint. On 11 May 2021, after missing the previous nine games with a minor hip issue, Bairstow was ruled out for the rest of the season.

=== Adelaide 36ers (2021–2022) ===
On 8 November 2021, Bairstow signed with the Adelaide 36ers for the 2021–22 NBL season. He was sidelined late in the season with an ankle injury.

On 23 August 2022, Bairstow announced his retirement from basketball, citing the multiple injuries he had suffered, the mental toll of rehab and playing while injured as the main reasons for stepping away from the game.

== NBA career statistics ==
Legend
GP	Games played	GS	Games started	MPG	Minutes per game
FG%	Field goal percentage	3P%	3-point field goal percentage	FT%	Free throw percentage
RPG	Rebounds per game	APG	Assists per game	SPG	Steals per game
BPG	Blocks per game	PPG	Points per game	**Bold**	Career high

=== Regular season ===
Year	Team	GP	GS	MPG	FG%	3P%	FT%	RPG	APG	SPG	BPG	PPG
2014–15	Chicago	**18**	1	3.6	.214	.000	.800	.4	.1	**.1**	.1	.6
2015–16	Chicago	**18**	**2**	**5.7**	**.325**	**.200**	**.875**	**1.6**	**.3**	**.1**	**.2**	**1.9**
Career		36	3	4.6	.296	.200	.846	1.0	.2	.1	.1	1.2

== National team career ==
In July 2012, Bairstow was named to the Australian national team, the Boomers, for the 2012 Australian Stanković Cup, and the team went on to a second-place finish. After his 2012–13 college season, he was named to the Boomers for the Sino-Australia Challenge against China in June 2013. He excelled during his debut with the Boomers and carried that form into the 2013 Stanković Cup and World University Games, winning gold and silver respectively. In August 2013, he was named to the Boomers 2013 FIBA Oceania Championship squad to take on New Zealand in a two-game series.

In July 2014, Bairstow was named to the Boomers squad for the 2014 FIBA Basketball World Cup in Spain.

In July 2016, Bairstow was named to the Boomers squad for the 2016 Summer Olympics in Rio de Janeiro, Brazil. There, he dislocated his shoulder in the pool game against Venezuela.

=== International statistics ===
Tournament	Points per game	Rebounds per game	Assists per game
2013 FIBA Oceania	3	2	1.5
2014 FIBA World Cup	7	3	1
2015 FIBA Oceania	9	6	1
2016 Olympic Games	5.4	4.4	0.2

Source: FIBA.com

== Youth camps and alumni games ==
After his NBA rookie season, Bairstow organized a youth camp teaching basketball skills and fundamentals, running 26–28 June 2015 at The Pit in Albuquerque. Numerous former New Mexico Lobo players participated as coaches. In conjunction with the camp, Bairstow coordinated a Lobo alumni all-star game, along with Brandon Mason, a former New Mexico State Aggie player and later a Lobo assistant coach. Twenty-one former Lobo players took part in the game, including NBA veterans Danny Granger and Tony Snell, drawing an attendance of 9,497 fans at The Pit for an entertaining exhibition. The event included a slam-dunk contest, autograph session for fans, and an auction of Lobo memorabilia. From the proceeds, Bairstow donated $16,000 to the Lobo Club and Pink Pack, a foundation organized by former Lobo and fellow Australian Hugh Greenwood to support breast cancer research and patient care.

Bairstow and Mason again organized a youth camp and alumni game the following summer. The camp was held 22–24 June 2016 at Sandia Prep school in Albuquerque, again with former Lobo players as coaches. This time the alumni all-star game matched a squad of former Lobo players against former Aggie players, again at The Pit. Billed as "The Battle of the Rio Grande," an allusion to the Rio Grande Rivalry, the teams included thirteen players who had played professionally the previous season, and the Lobo coaches included Lobo and ABA legend Ira Harge. The Lobo squad won a spirited game, 102–97, and J.R. Giddens was named MVP after scoring 20 for the Lobos. Bairstow expressed interest in continuing the camps and alumni games if circumstances allow.
