= Guam Basketball Association =

The Guam Basketball Association (GBA) is a men's professional basketball league in the United States territory of Guam. Promoted by the Guam Basketball Confederation, it is the tiny island-nation's FIBA-recognized basketball league.

== History ==
The GBA had its first season in 2015. Before the start of the GBA's third season in 2017, the league announced the creation of the WGBA, a women's league sponsored by the GBA.

== Teams ==
There are seven teams competing in the league; these teams are usually sponsored by major companies. Among those teams and their corporate sponsors:

- Auto Spot Phoenix, by Auto Spot
- University of Guam Tritons, by the University of Guam
- KFC Bombers, by American food retailer KFC
- MVP Stars
- Mitsubishi Outlanders, by Japanese car maker Mitsubishi
- MacTech Nerds, by MacTech (a magazine owned by Apple Computers)
- Toothfairies

== See also ==
- Basketball Champions League Asia
- East Asia Super League
- Guam men's national basketball team
