= 1978 FIBA Oceania Championship =

FIBA Oceania

FIBA Oceania Championship 1978
3rd FIBA Oceanian Basketball Championship

Tournament details
- Host country: New Zealand
- Dates: 1–8 April
- Teams: 2
- Venue(s): 3 (in 3 host cities)

Final positions
- Champions: Australia (3rd title)

The FIBA Oceania Championship for Men 1978 was the qualifying tournament of FIBA Oceania for the 1978 FIBA World Championship. The tournament, a best-of-three series between Australia and New Zealand, was held in Auckland, Lower Hutt and Christchurch. Australia won the series 2-1 to win its third consecutive Oceania Championship.

== Results ==
Australia	93–71	New Zealand
Scoring by half: 47-30, 46-41

Australia	65–67	New Zealand
Scoring by half: 28-29, 37-38

Australia	76–69	New Zealand
Scoring by half: 44-36, 32-33

1978 Oceanian champions

Australia
Third title
