= 1985 FIBA Oceania Championship =

FIBA Oceania Championship 1985
7th FIBA Oceanian Basketball Championship

Tournament details
- Host country: Australia
- Dates: 24–27 October
- Teams: 2 (from 21 federations)
- Venues: 2 (in 2 host cities)

Final positions
- Champions: Australia (7th title)

The FIBA Oceania Championship for Men 1985 was the qualifying tournament of FIBA Oceania for the 1986 FIBA World Championship. The tournament, a best-of-three series between Australia and New Zealand, was held in Sydney and Newcastle. Australia won the series 3–0 to win its seventh consecutive Oceania Championship.

== Results ==
24 October

Australia	92–66	New Zealand
Scoring by half: 49-29, 43-37

26 October

Australia	96–75	New Zealand
Scoring by half: 44-35, 52-40

27 October

Australia	98–62	New Zealand
Scoring by half: 45-19, 53-43

1985 Oceanian champions

Australia
Seventh title
