= 1991 FIBA Oceania Championship =

FIBA Oceania Championship 1991
10th FIBA Oceanian Basketball Championship

Tournament details
- Host country: New Zealand
- Dates: 1 – 7 June
- Teams: 2
- Venue(s): 1 (in 1 host city)

Final positions
- Champions: Australia (10th title)

The FIBA Oceania Championship for Men 1991 was the qualifying tournament of FIBA Oceania for the 1992 Summer Olympics. The tournament, a best-of-three series between Australia and New Zealand, was held in Wellington and Palmerston North, New Zealand. Australia won the series 2–0.

== Results ==
4 June

Australia	96–79	New Zealand
Scoring by half: 50-35, 46-44

Wellington

5 June

Australia	74–57	New Zealand
Scoring by half: 25-30, 49-27

Palmerston North

1991 Oceanian champions

Australia
Tenth title
