= 1971 FIBA Oceania Championship =

FIBA Oceania Championship 1971
1st FIBA Oceanian Basketball Championship

Tournament details
- Host country: New Zealand
- Dates: August 7 – August 13
- Teams: 2
- Venue(s): 3 (in 3 host cities)

Final positions
- Champions: Australia (1st title)

The FIBA Oceania Championship for Men 1971 was the qualifying tournament of FIBA Oceania for the 1972 Summer Olympics in Munich. The tournament, a best-of-three series between Australia and New Zealand, was held in Auckland, Rotorua and Christchurch. Australia won the series 3-0 to win the first Oceania Championship.

== Results ==
7 August

Australia	91–56	New Zealand
Scoring by half: 51-33, 40-23

Auckland

Australia	107–58	New Zealand
Scoring by half: 48-30, 59-28

Rotorua

14 August

Australia	117–72	New Zealand
Scoring by half: 44-37, 73-35
Australia wins series 3–0

Christchurch

1971 Oceanian champions

Australia
First title
