= 1981 FIBA Oceania Championship =

FIBA Oceania Championship 1981
5th FIBA Oceanian Basketball Championship

Tournament details
- Host country: New Zealand
- Teams: 2
- Venue(s): 1 (in 1 host city)

Final positions
- Champions: Australia (5th title)

The FIBA Oceania Championship for Men 1981 was the qualifying tournament of FIBA Oceania for the 1982 FIBA World Championship. The tournament, a best-of-three series between Australia and New Zealand, was held in Christchurch, New Zealand. Australia won the series 2-0.

== Results ==
07 August

Australia	76–53	New Zealand
Scoring by half: 33-26, 45-29

08 August

Australia	80–71	New Zealand
Scoring by half: 49-35, 31-36

1981 Oceanian champions

Australia
Fifth title
