= 2013 FIBA Oceania Championship =

FIBA Oceania Championship 2013
21st FIBA Oceanian Basketball Championship
- Official logo of the 2013 FIBA Oceania Championship

Tournament details
- Host countries: New Zealand; Australia
- Dates: 14–18 August
- Teams: 2
- Venue(s): 2 (in 2 host cities)

Final positions
- Champions: Australia (18th title)

Tournament statistics
- Top scorer: (Australia) Mills (20.5)
- Top rebounds: (New Zealand) Vukona (8.5)
- Top assists: (Australia) Ingles (3.5)
- PPG (Team): Australia (73.0)
- RPG (Team): New Zealand (30.5)
- APG (Team): Australia (15.5)

The 2013 FIBA Oceania Championship for Men was the 21st edition of the FIBA Oceania Championship. The tournament featured a two-game series between Australia and New Zealand between 14 and 18 August. It also served as the qualifying tournament of FIBA Oceania for the 2014 FIBA Basketball World Cup in Spain. The first game was held in Auckland, New Zealand followed by the second game in Canberra, Australia. Australia won their 18th title in the tournament, but the two teams still advanced to the World Cup.

== Venues ==
Auckland	2013 FIBA Oceania Championship (Australia and New Zealand)	Canberra
North Shore Events Centre	2013 FIBA Oceania Championship (Australia and New Zealand)	AIS Arena
Capacity: 4,400	2013 FIBA Oceania Championship (Australia and New Zealand)	Capacity: 5,200

== Rosters ==
Australia men's national basketball team roster
Players
Coaches

Pos.	No.	Name	Age – Date of birth	Height	Club	Ctr.
G	4	Dante Exum	18 – 13 July 1995	1.96 m (6 ft 5 in)	Utah Jazz	(United States)
G	5	Patty Mills	25 – 11 August 1988	1.83 m (6 ft 0 in)	San Antonio Spurs	(United States)
G	6	Adam Gibson	26 – 30 October 1986	1.88 m (6 ft 2 in)	Brisbane Bullets	(Australia)
G/F	7	Joe Ingles	25 – 2 October 1987	2.04 m (6 ft 8 in)	Utah Jazz	(United States)
F	8	Ben Simmons	17 – 20 July 1996	2.03 m (6 ft 8 in)	Montverde Academy	(United States)
G	9	Matthew Dellavedova	22 – 8 September 1990	1.91 m (6 ft 3 in)	Cleveland Cavaliers	(United States)
F	10	David Barlow	29 – 22 October 1983	2.05 m (6 ft 9 in)	Melbourne United	(Australia)
G/F	11	Ryan Broekhoff	22 – 23 August 1990	2.01 m (6 ft 7 in)	PBC Lokomotiv-Kuban	(Russia)
F	12	Cameron Bairstow	22 – 7 December 1990	2.06 m (6 ft 9 in)	New Mexico	(United States)
F/C	13	David Andersen	33 – 23 June 1980	2.12 m (6 ft 11 in)	Fenerbahçe Ülker	(Turkey)
F	14	Anthony Petrie	30 – 3 June 1983	2.03 m (6 ft 8 in)	Adelaide 36ers	(Australia)
C	15	Luke Nevill	27 – 19 February 1986	2.18 m (7 ft 2 in)	Townsville Crocodiles	(Australia)

Head coach

- (Australia) Andrej Lemanis

Assistant coaches

- (Australia) Luc Longley
- (Australia) Gordie McLeod
- (Australia) Adrian Hurley

Team doctor

- (Australia) Graham Lee

Physiotherapist

- (Australia) David Philpot

General manager

- (Australia) Jonathan Grady

Legend

- Club – describes last
  club before the tournament
- Age – describes age
  on 14 August 2013

New Zealand National Basketball Team roster
Players
Coaches

Pos.	No.	Name	Age – Date of birth	Height	Club	Ctr.
G	4	Jordan Ngatai	20 – 7 March 1993	1.98 m (6 ft 6 in)	Brigham Young University–Hawaii	(United States)
G	5	Everard Bartlett	27 – 6 February 1986	1.91 m (6 ft 3 in)	Hawke's Bay Hawks	(New Zealand)
G	6	Izayah Mauriohooho-Le'afa	16 – 7 November 1996	1.78 m (5 ft 10 in)	Wellington Saints	(New Zealand)
F	7	Mika Vukona (C)	31 – 13 May 1982	1.98 m (6 ft 6 in)	New Zealand Breakers	(New Zealand)
G	8	Jarrod Kenny	27 – 17 September 1985	1.86 m (6 ft 1 in)	Hawke's Bay Hawks	(New Zealand)
G	9	Corey Webster	24 – 29 November 1988	1.88 m (6 ft 2 in)	New Zealand Breakers	(New Zealand)
F	10	B. J. Anthony	25 – 20 July 1988	1.98 m (6 ft 6 in)	Adelaide 36ers	(Australia)
SF	11	Thomas Abercrombie	26 – 5 July 1987	1.98 m (6 ft 6 in)	New Zealand Breakers	(New Zealand)
F	12	Reuben Te Rangi	18 – 14 October 1994	1.97 m (6 ft 6 in)	New Zealand Breakers	(New Zealand)
F	13	Casey Frank	35 – 23 October 1977	2.03 m (6 ft 8 in)	Wellington Saints	(New Zealand)
F/C	14	Jack Salt	17 – 11 February 1996	2.05 m (6 ft 9 in)	New Zealand Breakers	(New Zealand)
C	15	Alex Pledger	26 – 27 March 1987	2.13 m (7 ft 0 in)	New Zealand Breakers	(New Zealand)

Head coach

- (Serbia) Nenad Vučinić

Assistant coach(es)

- (New Zealand) Pero Cameron
- (New Zealand) Paul Henare

Physiotherapist

- (New Zealand) Anousith Bouaaphone

General manager

- (New Zealand) Claire Dallison

Assistant manager

- (New Zealand) Michael Fitchett

Legend

- (C) Team captain
- Club field describes current pro club

== Results ==
Team 1	Agg.	Team 2	1st leg	2nd leg
New Zealand	122–146	Australia	59–70	63–76

=== Game 1 ===
All times are local (UTC+12).

ABC1

14 August 2013
19:30

Boxscore

New Zealand	59–70	Australia
Scoring by quarter: 18–21, 21–11, 13–22, 7–16
Pts: Webster 14; Rebs: Vukona 8 Asts: Vukona 5		Pts: Mills 20; Rebs: Ingles 8 Asts: Petrie 4
Australia leads series 1–0

North Shore Events Centre, Auckland, New Zealand
Referees: Ilija Belošević (SRB), Dallas Pickering (NZL), Vaughan Mayberry (AUS)

=== Game 2 ===
All times are local (UTC+10)

ABC1

18 August 2013
16:00

Boxscore

Australia	76–63	New Zealand
Scoring by quarter: 20–17, 13–22, 28–7, 15–17
Pts: Mills 21; Rebs: Nevill 6 Asts: Ingles 5		Pts: Webster 16; Rebs: Vukona 9 Asts: Webster, Anthony 2
Australia wins series 2–0

AIS Arena, Canberra, Australia
Referees: Ilija Belošević (SRB), Vaughan Mayberry (AUS), Dallas Pickering (NZL)
