= 2015 FIBA Oceania Championship =

22nd edition of basketball tournament, between Australia and New Zealand

22nd FIBA Oceanian Basketball Championship

Tournament details
- Host countries: Australia; New Zealand
- City: Melbourne; Wellington
- Dates: 15–18 August
- Teams: 2 (from 1 confederation)
- Venue: 2 (in 2 host cities)

Final positions
- Champions: Australia (19th title)
- Runners-up: New Zealand

Tournament statistics
- Top scorer: (New Zealand) Webster (19.0)
- Top rebounds: (New Zealand) Fotu (9.0)
- Top assists: (Australia) Dellavedova (4.5)
- PPG (Team): Australia (80.0)
- RPG (Team): Australia (41.5)
- APG (Team): New Zealand (15.0)

Official website
- FIBA (Wayback Machine)

The 2015 FIBA Oceania Championship was the 22nd and the last edition of the Oceanian men's basketball championship. The tournament featured a two-game series between Australia and New Zealand. It also served as the qualifying tournament of FIBA Oceania for basketball at the 2016 Summer Olympics in Rio de Janeiro, Brazil. The first game was held in Melbourne, Australia on August 15, followed by the second game in Wellington, New Zealand on August 18.

Australia won both games of the series, and with an aggregate score of 160–138, qualified to the 2016 Olympics. With the loss, New Zealand qualified to the 2016 FIBA World Olympic Qualifying Tournament for Men, the final qualifying tournament for the 2016 Olympics.

This was the last edition of the FIBA Oceania Championship to be held. From 2017, Oceanian teams compete with teams from FIBA Asia in the FIBA Asia Cup as part of changes to international competition formats announced by FIBA.

== Venues ==
Melbourne	2015 FIBA Oceania Championship (Australia and New Zealand)	Wellington
Rod Laver Arena	2015 FIBA Oceania Championship (Australia and New Zealand)	TSB Bank Arena
Capacity: 15,400	2015 FIBA Oceania Championship (Australia and New Zealand)	Capacity: 4,002

== Squads ==
=== Australia ===
Australia men's national basketball team roster
Players
Coaches

Pos.	No.	Name	Age – Date of birth	Height	Club	Ctr.
SG	4	Chris Goulding	26 – 24 October 1988	1.93 m (6 ft 4 in)	Melbourne United	(Australia)
G	5	Patty Mills	27 – 11 August 1988	1.83 m (6 ft 0 in)	San Antonio Spurs	(United States)
C	6	Andrew Bogut	30 – 28 November 1984	2.13 m (7 ft 0 in)	Golden State Warriors	(United States)
G	7	Adam Gibson	28 – 30 October 1986	1.91 m (6 ft 3 in)	Adelaide 36ers	(Australia)
F	8	Brad Newley	30 – 18 February 1985	1.98 m (6 ft 6 in)	Gran Canaria	(Spain)
PG	9	Matthew Dellavedova	24 – 8 September 1990	1.93 m (6 ft 4 in)	Cleveland Cavaliers	(United States)
F	10	Cameron Bairstow	24 – 7 December 1990	2.06 m (6 ft 9 in)	Chicago Bulls	(United States)
C	13	David Andersen	35 – 23 June 1980	2.11 m (6 ft 11 in)	ASVEL Basket	(France)
PF	14	Brock Motum	24 – 16 October 1990	2.08 m (6 ft 10 in)	BC Žalgiris	(Lithuania)
C	15	Nate Jawai	28 – 10 October 1986	2.08 m (6 ft 10 in)	BC Andorra	(Andorra)
SG	16	Cameron Gliddon	25 – 16 August 1989	1.96 m (6 ft 5 in)	Cairns Taipans	(Australia)
F	45	Ryan Broekhoff	24 – 23 August 1990	2.01 m (6 ft 7 in)	Beşiktaş Basketbol	(Turkey)

Head coach

- (Australia) Andrej Lemanis

Assistant coaches

- (Australia) Trevor Gleeson
- (Australia) Adrian Hurley
- (Australia) Luc Longley

Legend

- Club – last
  club before the tournament
- Age – age
  on 15 August 2015

=== New Zealand ===
New Zealand men's national basketball team roster
Players
Coaches

Pos.	No.	Name	Age – Date of birth	Height	Club	Ctr.
G	0	Shea Ili	22 – 6 October 1992	1.83 m (6 ft 0 in)	Southland Sharks	(New Zealand)
G/F	1	Reuben Te Rangi	20 – 14 October 1994	1.96 m (6 ft 5 in)	New Zealand Breakers	(New Zealand)
G	4	Lindsay Tait	33 – 8 January 1982	1.91 m (6 ft 3 in)	Wellington Saints	(New Zealand)
G	5	Everard Bartlett	29 – 6 February 1986	1.98 m (6 ft 6 in)	Ballarat Miners	(Australia)
G	6	Jarrod Kenny	29 – 17 September 1985	1.85 m (6 ft 1 in)	Hawke's Bay Hawks	(New Zealand)
F	7	Mika Vukona	33 – 13 May 1982	1.98 m (6 ft 6 in)	New Zealand Breakers	(New Zealand)
G	9	Corey Webster	26 – 29 November 1988	1.85 m (6 ft 1 in)	New Zealand Breakers	(New Zealand)
F	10	Thomas Abercrombie	28 – 5 July 1987	1.98 m (6 ft 6 in)	New Zealand Breakers	(New Zealand)
C	11	Tai Wynyard	17 – 5 February 1998	2.03 m (6 ft 8 in)	Super City Rangers	(New Zealand)
F	12	Isaac Fotu	21 – 18 December 1993	2.03 m (6 ft 8 in)	Bàsquet Manresa	(Spain)
SG	13	Dion Prewster	25 – 10 January 1990	1.96 m (6 ft 5 in)	Wellington Saints	(New Zealand)
C	14	Robert Loe	24 – 5 August 1991	2.11 m (6 ft 11 in)	Limburg United	(Belgium)

Head coach

- (New Zealand) Paul Henare

Assistant coaches

- (New Zealand) Pero Cameron
- (New Zealand) Michael Fitchett
- (New Zealand) Judd Flavell
- (New Zealand) Ross McMains

Legend

- Club – describes last
  club before the tournament
- Age – describes age
  on 15 August 2015

== Results ==
Team 1	Agg.	Team 2	1st leg	2nd leg
Australia	160–138	New Zealand	71–59	89–79

=== Game 1 ===
All times are local (UTC+10)

15 August 2015
20:30

Boxscore

Australia	71–59	New Zealand
Scoring by quarter: 12–16, 22–10, 15–18, 22–15
Pts: Mills, Andersen 17; Rebs: Broekhoff 7 Asts: Mills, Dellavedova 4		Pts: Webster 22; Rebs: Fotu 10; Asts: Vukona, Fotu 3
Australia leads series 1–0

Rod Laver Arena, Melbourne
Attendance: 15,062

=== Game 2 ===
All times are local (UTC+12).

18 August 2015
19:30

Boxscore

New Zealand	79–89	Australia
Scoring by quarter: 14–21, 19–19, 20–26, 26–23
Pts: Webster 16; Rebs: Vukona 8 Asts: Vukona 3		Pts: Dellavedova 14; Rebs: Bogut 10; Asts: Dellavedova 5
Australia wins series 2–0

TSB Bank Arena, Wellington
Attendance: 4,002

== Final rankings ==
Rank	Team	Record	Qualification	FIBA World Rankings		
Rank	Team	Record	Qualification	Before	After	Change
1st place, gold medalist(s)	Australia	2–0	Qualified to the Olympics	11	11	0
2nd place, silver medalist(s)	New Zealand	0–2	Qualified to Final Olympic Qualifying Tournament	21	21	0
