= 1975 FIBA Oceania Championship =

FIBA Oceania Championship 1975
2nd FIBA Oceanian Basketball Championship

Tournament details
- Host country: Australia
- Dates: November 6 – November 9
- Teams: 2
- Venue(s): 3 (in 3 host cities)

Final positions
- Champions: Australia (2nd title)

The FIBA Oceania Championship for Men 1975 was the qualifying tournament of FIBA Oceania for the 1976 Summer Olympics. The tournament, a best-of-three series between Australia and New Zealand, was held in Melbourne, Hobart and Launceston. Australia won the series 3-0 to win its second consecutive Oceania Championship.

== Results ==
November 6

Australia	83–57	New Zealand
Scoring by half: 41-23, 42-34

November 7

Australia	87–67	New Zealand
Scoring by half: 42-23, 45-44

Australia	101–63	New Zealand
Scoring by half: 49-40, 52-23

1975 Oceanian champions

Australia
Second title
