= 1983 FIBA Oceania Championship =

FIBA Oceania Championship 1983
6th FIBA Oceanian Basketball Championship

Tournament details
- Host country: New Zealand
- Dates: 30 August – 3 September
- Teams: 2
- Venue(s): 1 (in 1 host city)

Final positions
- Champions: Australia (6th title)

The FIBA Oceania Championship for Men 1983 was the qualifying tournament of FIBA Oceania for the 1984 Summer Olympics. The tournament, a best-of-three series between Australia and New Zealand, was held in Whangārei, New Zealand. Australia won the series 2–0.

== Results ==
30 August

Australia	89–52	New Zealand
Scoring by half: 37-22, 52-30

3 September

Australia	87–76	New Zealand
Scoring by half: 48-36, 39-40

1983 Oceanian champions

Australia
Sixth title
