= 1979 FIBA Oceania Championship =

FIBA Oceania Championship 1979
4th FIBA Oceanian Basketball Championship

Tournament details
- Host country: Australia
- Dates: August 5 – August 8
- Teams: 2
- Venue(s): 2 (in 2 host cities)

Final positions
- Champions: Australia (4th title)

The FIBA Oceania Championship for Men 1979 was the qualifying tournament of FIBA Oceania for the 1980 Summer Olympics. The tournament, a best-of-three series between Australia and New Zealand, was held in Sydney and Melbourne. Australia won the series 3–0 to win its fourth consecutive Oceania Championship.

== Results ==
August 5

Australia	65–41	New Zealand
Scoring by half: 32-16, 33-25

August 6

Australia	62–53	New Zealand
Scoring by half: 25-21, 37-32

August 8

Australia	115–73	New Zealand
Scoring by half: 47-40, 68-33

1979 Oceanian champions

Australia
Fourth title
