= 1989 FIBA Oceania Championship =

FIBA Oceania Championship 1989
9th FIBA Oceanian Basketball Championship

Tournament details
- Host country: Australia
- Dates: 28 August – 3 September
- Teams: 2
- Venue(s): 1 (in 1 host city)

Final positions
- Champions: Australia (9th title)

The FIBA Oceania Championship for Men 1989 was the qualifying tournament of FIBA Oceania for the 1990 FIBA World Championship. The tournament, a best-of-three series between Australia and New Zealand, was held in Sydney. Australia won the series 2–0.

== Results ==
28 August

Australia	91–54	New Zealand
Scoring by half: 43-26, 48-28

3 September

Australia	106–55	New Zealand
Scoring by half: 54-23, 52-32

1989 Oceanian champions

Australia
Ninth title
