= 1995 FIBA Oceania Championship =

Continental basketball championship

FIBA Oceania Championship 1995
12th FIBA Oceanian Basketball Championship

Tournament details
- Host country: Australia
- Dates: June 18 – June 22
- Teams: 3 (from 21 federations)
- Venue: 1 (in 1 host city)

Final positions
- Champions: Australia (12th title)

The FIBA Oceania Championship for Men 1995 was the qualifying tournament of FIBA Oceania for the 1996 Summer Olympics in Atlanta. The tournament was held in Sydney. Australia won its 12th Oceania Championship to qualify for the Olympics.

== Results ==
Pos	Team	Pld	W	L	PF	PA	PD	Pts	Qualification
1	Australia (H)	2	2	0	248	137	+111	4	Championship
2	New Zealand	2	1	1	225	173	+52	3	Championship
3	American Samoa	2	0	2	115	278	−163	2	

(H) Hosts

June 18

Australia	141–49	American Samoa

June 19

New Zealand	137–66	American Samoa

June 20

Australia	107–88	New Zealand

== Championship ==
June 22

Australia	102–62	New Zealand

== Final standings ==
Rank	Team	Record
1	Australia	3–0
2	New Zealand	1–2
3	American Samoa	0–2

Australia qualified for the 1996 Summer Olympics in Atlanta, Georgia.
