= Matthew Nielsen =

Australian professional basketball player and coach

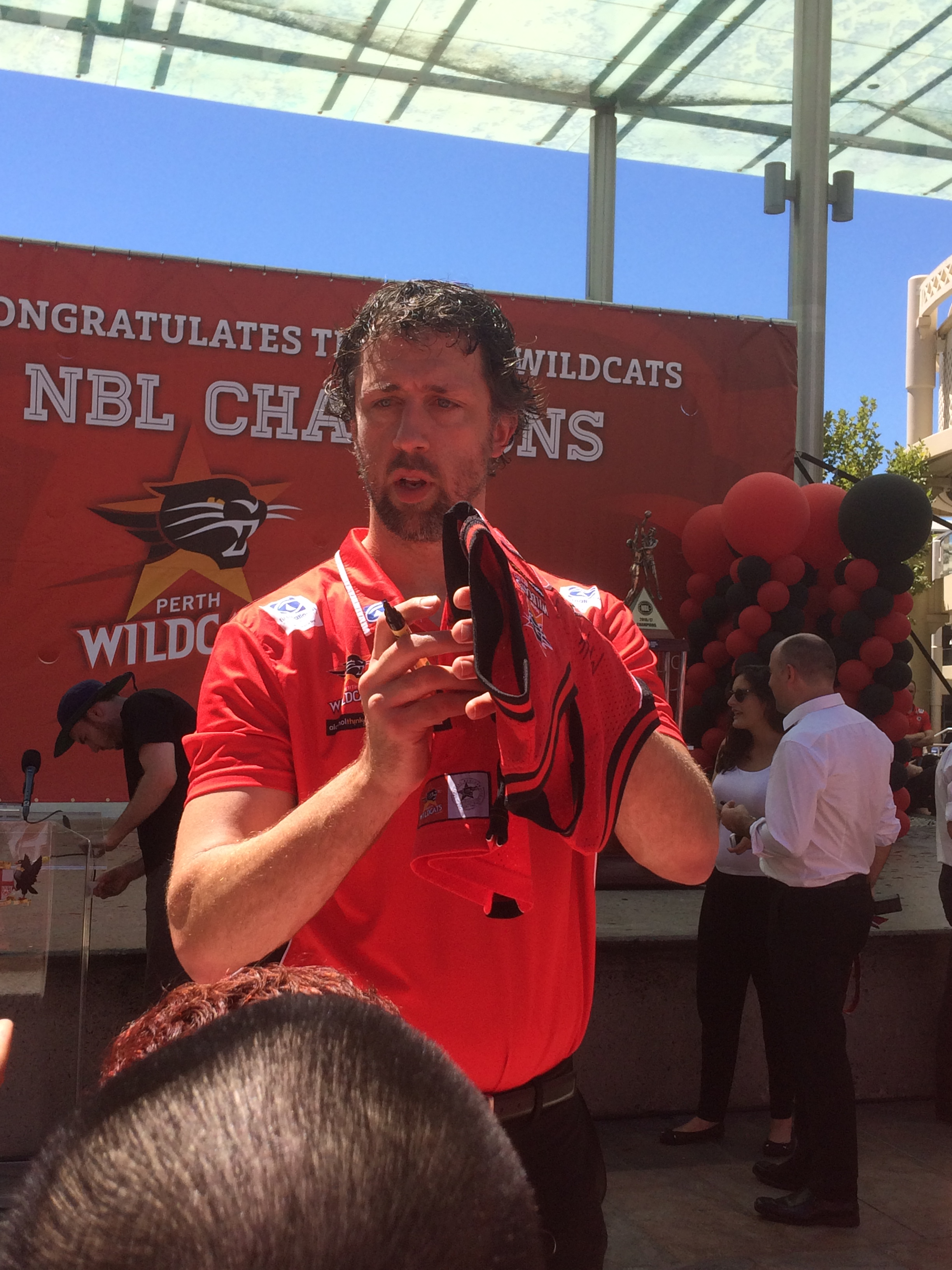
- Nielsen in March 2017

San Antonio Spurs
- Title: Assistant coach
- League: NBA

Personal information
- Born: 3 February 1978 (age 48) Sydney, New South Wales
- Listed height: 208 cm (6 ft 10 in)
- Listed weight: 105 kg (231 lb)

Career information
- High school: St Marys (Sydney, New South Wales)
- NBA draft: 2000: undrafted
- Playing career: 1995–2013
- Position: Power forward
- Coaching career: 2015–present

Career history

Playing
- 1995: Sydney Sky
- 1995: Sydney Kings
- 1996: Australian Institute of Sport
- 1997: Sydney Sky
- 1997–2004: Sydney Kings
- 2000: Penrith Panthers
- 2004–2005: PAOK Thessaloniki
- 2005–2008: Lietuvos Rytas
- 2008–2010: Valencia
- 2010–2011: Olympiacos Piraeus
- 2011–2013: Khimki

Coaching
- 2015–2019: Perth Wildcats (assistant)
- 2019–2020: Austin Spurs (assistant)
- 2020–2021: Austin Spurs
- 2021–present: San Antonio Spurs (assistant)

Career highlights
- As player: 2× EuroCup champion (2010, 2012); EuroCup Finals MVP (2010); All-EuroCup First Team (2010); All-EuroCup Second Team (2009); LKL champion (2006); LKL All-Star (2007); 2× Baltic League champion (2006, 2007); Baltic League All-Star (2006); 2× NBL champion (2003, 2004); NBL Grand Final MVP (2004); NBL Most Valuable Player (2004); All-NBL First Team (2004); 2× All-NBL Second Team (2001, 2003); NBL Rookie of the Year (1997); NBL scoring champion (2004); Gaze Medal winner (2003); 2× SEABL East YPOY (1995, 1996); As coach: 3× NBL champion (2016, 2017, 2019)

Matthew Peter Nielsen (born 3 February 1978) is an Australian professional basketball coach and former player who is an assistant coach for the San Antonio Spurs of the National Basketball Association (NBA). He served as an assistant coach for the Perth Wildcats of the National Basketball League (NBL) from 2015 to 2019.

== Early life and career ==
Nielsen was born in the Sydney suburb of Penrith. He played as a junior for Newcastle Basketball Association and attended St Marys Senior High School.

In 1995, Nielsen played for the Sydney Sky in the South East Australian Basketball League (SEABL) and made his NBL debut with the Sydney Kings as a development player. In 1996, he moved to Canberra to attend the Australian Institute of Sport (AIS). He played for the AIS men's team in the SEABL. He was named SEABL East Youth Player of the Year in 1995 and 1996. He played six games for the Sky in 1997 and played for the Penrith Panthers in the SEABL in 2000.

== Professional career ==
=== Sydney Kings ===
For the 1997 NBL season, Nielsen returned to the Sydney Kings and won the NBL Rookie of the Year Award. He played in the NBL Future Forces Game and finished third in the NBL Best Sixth Man Award in 1997. He was named in the All-NBL Second Team in 2001 and 2003 and won his first NBL championship in 2003. In the 2003–04 NBL season, Nielsen was named league MVP, All-NBL First Team, grand final MVP and captained the Kings to back-to-back championships. He also led the league in scoring with an average of 23.5 points per game, was second in rebounds (10.1) and second in blocked shots (2.7).

In 244 games for the Kings over nine seasons, Nielsen averaged 17.5 points, 8.0 rebounds, 2.6 assists, 1.0 steals and 1.5 blocks per game. In 2013, he was named in the Sydney Kings 25th Anniversary Team.

=== Europe ===
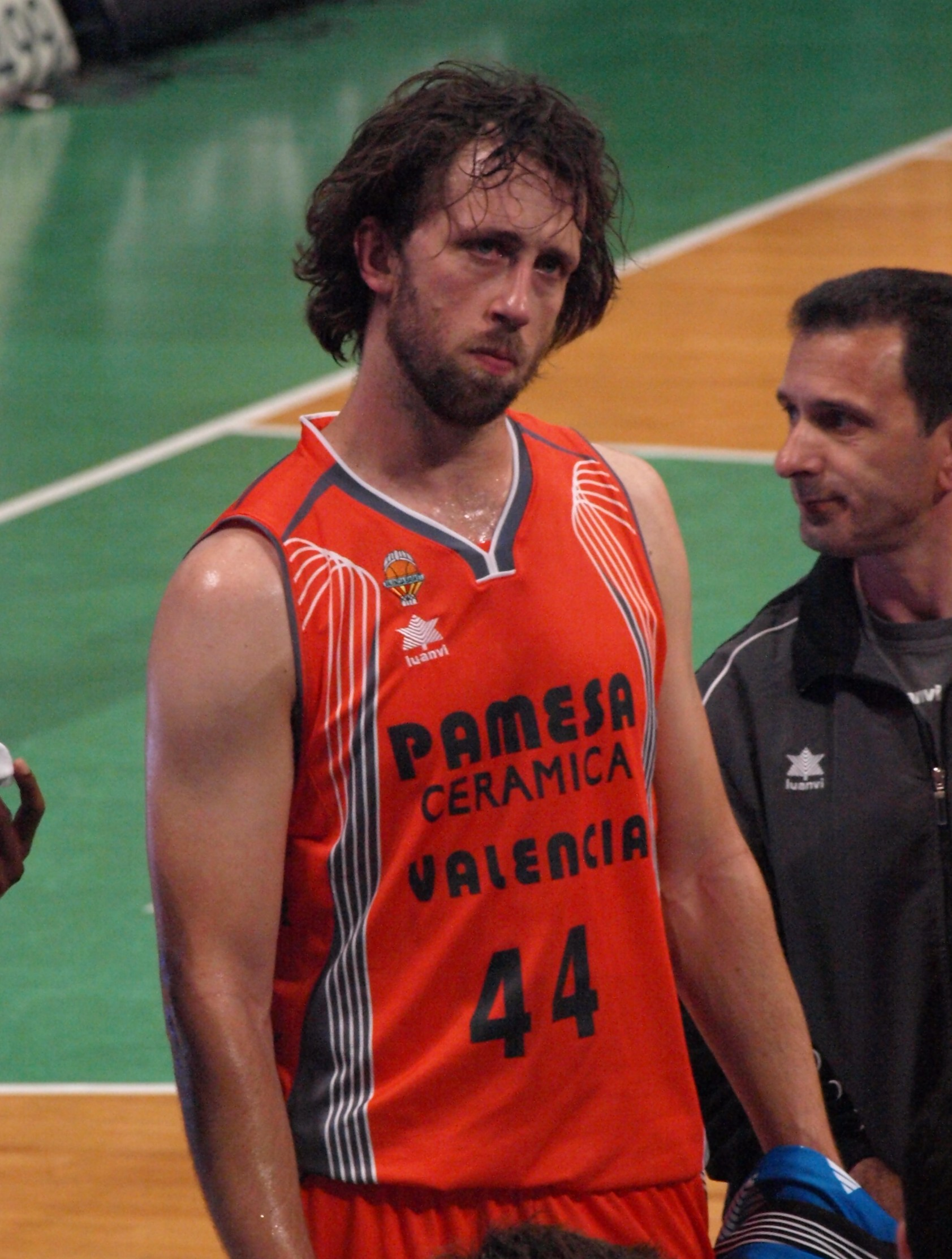
Nielsen in 2009, with Valencia.

In 2004, Nielsen began a decorated European career playing for PAOK Thessaloniki in Greece, Lietuvos Rytas in Lithuania, Valencia in Spain, Olympiacos Piraeus also in Greece, and Khimki in Russia.

== National team career ==
Nielsen won the gold medal at the 1997 FIBA Under-21 World Championship with Australia's junior national team. He was also a member of the senior men's Australian national basketball team. With Australia's senior national team, he won gold medals at the 2001 Goodwill Games, the 2003 FIBA Oceanian Championship, and the 2005 FIBA Oceania Championship. He represented Australia at the 2004, 2008 and 2012 Olympics.

In July 2024, Nielsen was inducted into the Australian Basketball Hall of Fame.

== Coaching career ==
=== Clubs ===
During the 2013–14 NBL season, Nielsen served as a big-man coach for the Perth Wildcats.

In 2014, Nielsen joined the San Antonio Spurs coaching staff in a player development role, on a contract that ran through to the end of the 2015 NBA Summer League.

On 29 July 2015, Nielsen returned to the Perth Wildcats, signing with the club as an assistant coach ahead of the 2015–16 NBL season. On 10 April 2019, after three championships in four seasons, Nielsen parted ways with the Wildcats in order to pursue coaching opportunities in the United States.

On 5 November 2019, Nielsen was appointed assistant coach of the Austin Spurs of the NBA G League. On 10 November 2020, he was promoted to head coach of the Spurs.

On 8 September 2021, Nielsen was appointed assistant coach of the San Antonio Spurs.

=== National team ===
On 8 December 2020, Nielsen was named as assistant coach of the Australian senior men's national team under head coach Brian Goorjian. He was still in the position as of May 2023.

== EuroLeague career statistics ==
Legend
GP	Games played	GS	Games started	MPG	Minutes per game
FG%	Field-goal percentage	3P%	3-point field-goal percentage	FT%	Free-throw percentage
RPG	Rebounds per game	APG	Assists per game	SPG	Steals per game
BPG	Blocks per game	PPG	Points per game	PIR	Performance index rating
**Bold**	Career high

Year	Team	GP	GS	MPG	FG%	3P%	FT%	RPG	APG	SPG	BPG	PPG	PIR
2005–06	Lietuvos Rytas	**19**	**13**	**25.8**	.464	**.357**	.703	**5.2**	**1.7**	**1.1**	.3	**12.4**	**13.6**
2007–08	Lietuvos Rytas	13	**13**	24.1	**.495**	.250	**.805**	4.8	1.5	.8	**.5**	9.9	12.2
2010–11	Olympiacos Piraeus	14	9	16.0	.386	.143	.750	2.9	.6	.6	.1	4.4	3.9
2012–13	Khimki	15	2	11.5	.462	.000	.500	1.7	1.6	.3	.3	1.7	3.1
Career		61	37	19.6	.459	.261	.729	3.7	1.4	.7	.3	7.4	8.5

== Personal life ==
Nielsen and his wife Terri have three children. His son, Blake, played college basketball for St. Edward's University and signed with the Perth Wildcats in 2026.
