= 1987 FIBA Oceania Championship =

Continental basketball championship

FIBA Oceania Championship 1987
8th FIBA Oceanian Basketball Championship

Tournament details
- Host country: New Zealand
- Dates: 31 August – 4 September
- Teams: 3 (from 21 federations)
- Venues: 2 (in 2 host cities)

Final positions
- Champions: Australia (8th title)

The FIBA Oceania Championship for Men 1987 was the qualifying tournament of FIBA Oceania for the 1988 Summer Olympics. The tournament was held in Timaru and Christchurch. For the first time, a team other than Australia and New Zealand competed after French Polynesia decided to send a team to the tournament. Australia won its 8th consecutive Oceania Championship to qualify for Olympics.

== Results ==
Pos	Team	Pld	W	L	PF	PA	PD	Pts	Qualification
1	Australia	2	2	0	224	106	+118	4	Championship
2	New Zealand (H)	2	1	1	194	141	+53	3	Championship
3	French Polynesia	2	0	2	84	255	−171	2	

(H) Hosts

31 August

Australia	136–31	French Polynesia

1 September

Australia	88–75	New Zealand

2 September

New Zealand	119–53	French Polynesia

== Championship ==
4 September

Australia	115–59	New Zealand

== Final standings ==
Rank	Team	Record
1	Australia	3–0
2	New Zealand	1–2
3	French Polynesia	0–2

Australia qualified for the 1988 Summer Olympics in Seoul, South Korea.
