= FIBA Oceania Championship =

Former basketball competition

- Sport: Basketball
- Founded: 1971
- First season: 1971
- Folded: 2015
- Replaced by: FIBA Asia Cup
- No. of teams: 2
- Country: FIBA Oceania member nations
- Continent: FIBA Oceania (Oceania)
- Last champion: Australia (19th title)
- Most titles: Australia (19 titles)

FIBA Oceania Championship was the Oceania basketball championship that took place every two years between national teams of the continent. It was also the qualifying tournament for the Basketball World Cups and Olympic Games.

The first edition of the tournament was held in 1971. When only Australia and New Zealand competed, the tournament was usually a best-of-three playoff; if other teams competed, a round-robin and a knockout stage was employed. In 2009, the Oceania Basketball Federation changed this format to a two-game, home-and-away playoff between the two countries, with aggregate score as the tiebreaker should the teams split the series.

Beginning in 2017, all FIBA continental championships for men were held on a four-year cycle, and the continental championships were no longer part of the qualifying process for either the World Cup or Olympics. The 2015 Oceania Championship was the last to be held, and since 2017, the tournament merged with the former FIBA Asia Championship to give way to a competition now known as the FIBA Asia Cup.

== Summaries ==
Year	Hosts	Championship series					Third place
Year	Hosts	Champions	Game 1	Game 2	Game 3	Runners-up	Third place
1971; Details	New Zealand	Australia	91–56	107–58	117–72	New Zealand	Only two teams competed
1975; Details	Australia	Australia	83–57	87–67	101–63	New Zealand	Only two teams competed
1978; Details	New Zealand	Australia	93–71	65–67	76–69	New Zealand	Only two teams competed
1979; Details	Australia	Australia	65–41	62–53	115–73	New Zealand	Only two teams competed
1981; Details	New Zealand	Australia	78–55	80–71	N/A	New Zealand	Only two teams competed
1983; Details	New Zealand	Australia	89–52	87–76	N/A	New Zealand	Only two teams competed
1985; Details	Australia	Australia	92–66	96–75	98–62	New Zealand	Only two teams competed
1987; Details	New Zealand	Australia	115–59	One game playoff for the championship		New Zealand	French Polynesia
1989; Details	Australia	Australia	91–54	106–55	N/A	New Zealand	Only two teams competed
1991; Details	New Zealand	Australia	96–79	74–57	N/A	New Zealand	Only two teams competed
1993; Details	New Zealand	Australia	86–78	One game playoff for the championship		New Zealand	Western Samoa
1995; Details	Australia	Australia	102–62	One game playoff for the championship		New Zealand	American Samoa
1997; Details	New Zealand	Australia	85–67	One game playoff for the championship		New Zealand	New Caledonia
1999; Details	New Zealand	New Zealand	125–43	One game playoff for the championship		Guam	Only two teams competed
2001; Details	New Zealand	New Zealand	85–78	79–81 (overtime)	89–78	Australia	Only two teams competed
2003; Details	Australia	Australia	79–66	90–76	84–75	New Zealand	Only two teams competed
2005; Details	New Zealand	Australia	82–69	82–71	91–80	New Zealand	Only two teams competed
2007; Details	Australia	Australia	79–67	93–67	58–67	New Zealand	Only two teams competed
2009; Details	Australia; New Zealand	New Zealand	77–84	100–78	Two-legged tie	Australia	Only two teams competed
2011; Details	Australia	Australia	91–78	81–64	92–68	New Zealand	Only two teams competed
2013; Details	New Zealand; Australia	Australia	70–59	76–63	Two-legged tie	New Zealand	Only two teams competed
2015; Details	Australia; New Zealand	Australia	71–59	89–79	Two-legged tie	New Zealand	Only two teams competed

== Medal table ==
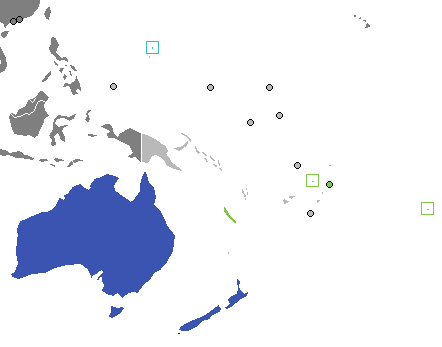
Map of countries' best results.

Rank	Nation	Gold	Silver	Bronze	Total
1	Australia	19	2	0	21
2	New Zealand	3	19	0	22
3	Guam	0	1	0	1
4	American Samoa	0	0	1	1
4	New Caledonia	0	0	1	1
4	Samoa	0	0	1	1
4	Tahiti	0	0	1	1
Totals (7 entries)		22	22	4	48

== Participating nations ==
Nation	(New Zealand) 1971	(Australia) 1975	(New Zealand) 1978	(Australia) 1979	(New Zealand) 1981	(New Zealand) 1983	(Australia) 1985	(New Zealand) 1987	(Australia) 1989	(New Zealand) 1991	(New Zealand) 1993	(Australia) 1995	(New Zealand) 1997	(New Zealand) 1999	(New Zealand) 2001	(Australia) 2003	(New Zealand) 2005	(Australia) 2007	(Australia) 2009	(Australia) 2011	(New Zealand) 2013	(Australia) 2015	Years
American Samoa												3rd											1
Australia	1st	1st	1st	1st	1st	1st	1st	1st	1st	1st	1st	1st	1st		2nd	1st	1st	1st	2nd	1st	1st	1st	21
Guam														2nd									1
New Caledonia													3rd										1
New Zealand	2nd	2nd	2nd	2nd	2nd	2nd	2nd	2nd	2nd	2nd	2nd	2nd	2nd	1st	1st	2nd	2nd	2nd	1st	2nd	2nd	2nd	22
Samoa											3rd												1
Tahiti								3rd															1
Total	2	2	2	2	2	2	2	3	2	2	3	3	3	2	2	2	2	2	2	2	2	2	

== See also ==
- FIBA Oceania
- Basketball at the Olympic Games
- Basketball at the Commonwealth Games
- Basketball at the Pacific Games
- FIBA Basketball World Cup
- FIBA Oceania Women's Championship
- Al Ramsay Shield
