= Kirk Penney =

New Zealand basketball player (born 1980)

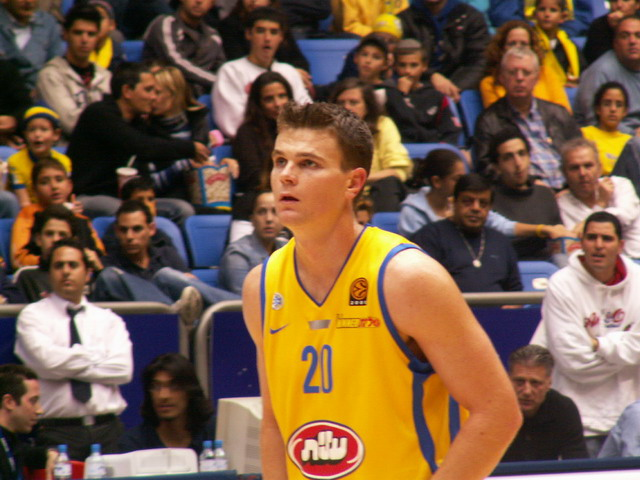
- Penney with Maccabi Tel Aviv in 2005

Personal information
- Born: 23 November 1980 (age 45) Auckland, New Zealand
- Listed height: 196 cm (6 ft 5 in)
- Listed weight: 98 kg (216 lb)

Career information
- High school: Westlake Boys (Auckland, New Zealand)
- College: Wisconsin (1999–2003)
- NBA draft: 2003: undrafted
- Playing career: 1998–2018; 2022
- Position: Shooting guard / small forward
- Number: 6, 20

Career history
- 1998–2000: North Harbour Kings
- 2003: Miami Heat
- 2003–2004: Gran Canaria
- 2004–2005: Asheville Altitude
- 2004–2005: Los Angeles Clippers
- 2005–2006: Maccabi Tel Aviv
- 2006–2007: Žalgiris Kaunas
- 2007: ALBA Berlin
- 2007–2011: New Zealand Breakers
- 2010: Sioux Falls Skyforce
- 2011–2012: Baloncesto Fuenlabrada
- 2012–2013: TED Ankara Kolejliler
- 2013–2014: Trabzonspor
- 2015: Baloncesto Sevilla
- 2015–2016: Illawarra Hawks
- 2016–2018: New Zealand Breakers
- 2022: Auckland Tuatara

Career highlights
- NBL champion (2011); NBL Most Valuable Player (2009); 4× All-NBL First Team (2008–2011); All-NBL Second Team (2016); 3× NBL scoring champion (2009–2011); NZNBL Most Outstanding Kiwi Guard (1999); NZNBL Rookie of the Year (1998); 2× TBL All-Star (2013, 2014); 2× TBL Three-Point Shootout champion (2013, 2014); Lithuanian LKL champion (2007); Lithuanian LKF Cup winner (2007); Baltic League All-Star (2007); Israeli League champion (2006); Israeli Basketball State Cup winner (2006); NBA D-League champion (2005); AP honorable mention All-American (2003); 2× First-team All-Big Ten (2002, 2003)
- Stats at NBA.com
- Stats at Basketball Reference
- FIBA Hall of Fame
Medals
Representing New Zealand
Men's basketball
Oceanian Championship
Gold medal – first place	2009 Oceania	National team

Kirk Samuel Penney (born 23 November 1980) is a New Zealand former professional basketball player. He is the all-time leading scorer for New Zealand's national team and he ranks 12th all-time in points scored at the FIBA World Cup. In 2024, he was inducted in the FIBA Hall of Fame.

Penney played four years of college basketball for the Wisconsin Badgers between 1999 and 2003, where he was twice named first-team all-conference and as an all-American. He became the second New Zealander in the NBA when he appeared briefly for the Miami Heat in 2003 and the Los Angeles Clippers in 2005. He went on to play professionally in Spain, the NBA Development League, Israel, Lithuania, Germany and Turkey. He also played six seasons for the New Zealand Breakers of the Australian National Basketball League (NBL). He was named the NBL MVP in 2009, named to the All-NBL First Team four times, led the NBL in scoring three times and won an NBL championship with the Breakers in 2011.

Penney represented New Zealand at the Sydney and Athens Olympics and averaged 16.9 points at the World Championships in Indianapolis in 2002 and 24.7 points at the World Championships in Turkey in 2010.

== Early life ==
Penney was born in Auckland, New Zealand, in the North Shore region. He attended Westlake Boys High School and played junior basketball for the North Harbour Basketball Association, joining their New Zealand NBL team, the North Harbour Kings, in 1998 as a 17-year-old. He earned NZNBL Rookie of the Year honours that year and helped the Kings reach the grand final. He also played for the Kings in 1999 and 2000.

== College career ==
As a freshman playing for the Wisconsin Badgers during the 1999–2000 season, Penney had a minimal role under coach Dick Bennett, but still helped his team reach the NCAA Final Four while averaging 3.7 points and 1.4 rebounds in 34 games. As a sophomore in 2000–01, he averaged 11.2 points per game and was the second-leading scorer on the team.

As a junior in 2001–02 playing for coach Bo Ryan, Penney was the team's leading scorer. He averaged 15.1 points and 4.9 rebounds per game while shooting 45.4 percent from the field and teamed with point guard Devin Harris to guide the Badgers to a share of the Big Ten title. Penney subsequently earned first-team All-Big Ten honours in 2001–02.

As a senior in 2002–03, Penney was again the team's leading scorer. He averaged 16.2 points and was second on the team with 6.0 rebounds per game, as Wisconsin won the Big Ten regular-season title outright. For his senior-year efforts, Penney earned first-team All-Big Ten honours again and was named an honorable mention All-American. His 217 career three-point field goals made ranks third in programme history.

== Professional career ==
=== NBA and Europe (2003–2007) ===
Penney was not drafted in the star-studded 2003 NBA draft but joined the Minnesota Timberwolves in July that year for the Orlando Pro Summer League where he led the league in three-point shooting. On 1 September 2003, he signed with the Timberwolves, but did not make the team's final roster as he was waived on 23 October prior to the start of the 2003–04 NBA season. On 3 November, he signed with the Miami Heat and made his NBA debut that same day, scoring three points in 14 minutes of action against the Dallas Mavericks. Penney became the second New Zealander (after Sean Marks) to play in the NBA. The following day, he made his second appearance for the Heat, but record no stats in just four minutes of action against the San Antonio Spurs. On 7 November, he was waived by the Heat after the team signed Tyrone Hill instead.

Following his release from the Heat, Penney moved to Spain and signed with Gran Canaria for the rest of the 2003–04 season. In 24 Liga ACB games for Canaria, he averaged 10.6 points and 2.1 rebounds per game.

In July 2004, Penney joined the Minnesota Timberwolves for the Minnesota Summer League in Minneapolis, and the Chicago Bulls for the Rocky Mountain Revenue in Salt Lake City. On 4 November 2004, he was selected with the sixth overall pick in the 2004 NBA Development League Draft by the Asheville Altitude. He had an impressive start to the 2004–05 season and earned himself an NBA call-up. On 26 December 2004, he signed with the Los Angeles Clippers. He appeared in four games for the Clippers and scored just two points. He was waived by the Clippers on 3 January 2005 and returned to the Asheville Altitude to play out the season and help the team win the 2005 NBA D-League championship.

On 5 August 2005, Penney signed a two-year deal with Maccabi Tel Aviv of the Israeli Basketball Premier League. He was used sparingly as a shooter off the bench and helped Maccabi qualify for the Euroleague Final Four, eventually losing to CSKA Moscow in the final. Maccabi did, however, win the 2006 Premier League championship. In 19 Euroleague games for Maccabi in 2005–06, Penney averaged 3.3 points per game.

In October 2006, Penney signed with Žalgiris Kaunas as an injury replacement for Marcelinho Machado. After Žalgiris won the Lithuanian Basketball League Cup, Penney parted ways with Žalgiris. On 16 February 2007, he signed with ALBA Berlin of Germany for the rest of the 2006–07 season.

=== New Zealand Breakers (2007–2010) ===
In June 2007, Penney signed with the New Zealand Breakers of the Australian National Basketball League. In 31 games in 2007–08, he averaged 24.2 points, 4.8 rebounds and 2.6 assists per game. He was named to the All-NBL First Team.

In the 2008–09 NBL season, Penney was named the NBL Most Valuable Player, becoming the first New Zealander to be honoured with the award. He led the league in scoring and earned All-NBL First Team for the second straight year. In 31 games, he averaged 24.1 points, 4.3 rebounds and 2.8 assists per game.

On 21 January 2010, Penney scored 49 points and made nine 3-pointers in a 103–89 win over the Adelaide 36ers. He was named to the All-NBL First Team for the third straight year in the 2009–10 NBL season. In 19 games, he averaged 23.2 points, 5.2 rebounds and 2.7 assists per game.

=== Skyforce and Spurs (2010) ===
Following the conclusion of the 2009–10 NBL season, Penney returned to the United States, and on 24 March 2010, he was acquired by the Sioux Falls Skyforce of the NBA Development League. In just his second game for the Skyforce, he scored a game-high 31 points on 12-of-17 shooting from the field, adding four rebounds, three assists and a steal in 43 minutes of game time in a 113–104 win over the Springfield Armor. In the Skyforce's final game of the regular season, he scored 40 points in a win over the Bakersfield Jam. The Skyforce made it to the first round of the playoffs where they lost to the Tulsa 66ers 2–1 in the best-of-three series. In seven total games for the Skyforce, he averaged 22.7 points, 4.4 rebounds, 2.1 assists and 1.4 steals per game.

On 28 September 2010, Penney signed with the San Antonio Spurs. However, he was later waived by the Spurs on 11 October after appearing in one preseason game and scoring 9 points.

=== First NBL Championship (2010–11) ===
On 26 October 2010, Penney returned to the New Zealand Breakers for the rest of the 2010–11 NBL season. He helped the Breakers win their first NBL championship with a 2–1 grand final series win over the Cairns Taipans. In 29 games, he averaged 20.0 points, 4.0 rebounds and 2.3 assists per game. He was subsequently named to the All-NBL First Team for the fourth time.

=== Return to Europe (2011–2015) ===
On 29 July 2011, Penney signed with Baloncesto Fuenlabrada of Spain for the 2011–12 season. During the 2011–12 ACB season, Penney was the fifth leading points scorer with 14.4 points per game.

In July 2012, Penney signed with TED Ankara Kolejliler of Turkey for the 2012–13 season. During the 2012–13 TBL season, Penney was the league's third leading points scorer with 18.3 points per game, hitting over 46% of his three-point shots.

In August 2013, Penney signed with Trabzonspor for the 2013–14 season.

In mid-2014, Penney returned to the University of Wisconsin to finish off his degree. On 26 January 2015, he signed with Baloncesto Sevilla of the Spanish Liga ACB. In 16 games for Sevilla, he averaged 11.3 points, 3.3 rebounds and 1.8 assists per game.

=== Illawarra Hawks (2015–2016) ===
On 27 July 2015, Penney signed with the Illawarra Hawks for the 2015–16 NBL season. In just the third game of the season on 14 October, he scored a season-high 36 points in a 96–75 win over his former team, the New Zealand Breakers. He didn't miss a game for the Hawks over the team's first 22 contests before a hamstring injury suffered on 17 January 2016 against the Breakers forced him to miss four straight games. He returned to action on 6 February, scoring 28 points in a 104–97 overtime win over the Townsville Crocodiles. He helped the Hawks finish the regular season in third place with a 17–11 win–loss record, booking themselves a semi-final clash with the second-seeded Perth Wildcats. After losing Game 1 in Perth, the Hawks took Game 2 at home to save the series, but went on to lose the deciding Game 3 in Perth, bowing out of the playoffs with a 2–1 defeat. In 27 games for the Hawks in 2015–16, Penney averaged 20.4 points, 3.0 rebounds and 3.1 assists per game.

=== Return to the Breakers (2016–2018) ===
On 12 April 2016, Penney signed a three-year deal with the New Zealand Breakers. On 7 October 2016, he played in his first game for the Breakers since 2011, scoring nine points in a 76–71 season-opening win over Melbourne United. On 29 October 2016, he scored 27 points in a 119–93 win over the Adelaide 36ers. On 6 November 2016, he scored 30 points in an 86–70 win over the Brisbane Bullets. He appeared in all 28 games for the Breakers in 2016–17, averaging 17.3 points, 3.4 rebounds and 2.4 assists per game.

The Breakers started the 2017–18 season with a 9–1 record, before dropping to 9–3 with two Round 8 defeats. In the second defeat of Round 8, Penney was held scoreless for the first time in his 174-game NBL career. On 15 December 2017, against the Adelaide 36ers in Auckland, Penney played his 150th game for the Breakers. The Breakers finished the regular season in fourth place with a 15–13 record. On 22 February 2018, with finals only a week away, Penney announced his decision to retire at the end of the 2017–18 season. His final game came in the Breakers season-ending loss to Melbourne United in Game 2 of their semi-finals series; in the 88–86 overtime loss, Penney had 17 points off the bench. In 22 games in 2017–18, he averaged 10.1 points, 2.7 rebounds and 1.0 assists per game.

=== Auckland Tuatara (2022) ===
In August 2022, Penney came out of retirement to play for the Auckland Tuatara of the New Zealand NBL in their final regular season game of the 2022 season.

== Career statistics ==
Legend
GP	Games played	GS	Games started	MPG	Minutes per game
FG%	Field goal percentage	3P%	3-point field goal percentage	FT%	Free throw percentage
RPG	Rebounds per game	APG	Assists per game	SPG	Steals per game
BPG	Blocks per game	PPG	Points per game	**Bold**	Career high

=== NBA ===
Year	Team	GP	GS	MPG	FG%	3P%	FT%	RPG	APG	SPG	BPG	PPG
2003–04	Miami	2	0	**9.0**	.167	**.333**	.000	**.5**	**.5**	**.5**	.0	**1.5**
2004–05	L.A. Clippers	**4**	0	3.0	**.333**	.000	.000	.4	.3	.0	.0	.5
Career		6	0	5.0	.222	.250	.000	.3	.3	.2	.0	.8

=== Euroleague ===
Year	Team	GP	GS	MPG	FG%	3P%	FT%	RPG	APG	SPG	BPG	PPG	PIR
2005–06	Maccabi Tel Aviv	19	0	7.3	.588	.478	.714	.8	.1	.2	.0	3.3	2.4
2006–07	Žalgiris	13	2	18.5	.514	.452	.500	2.0	.8	.2	.0	7.4	5.2

== National team career ==
Penney debuted for the New Zealand national basketball team in 1999 at the age of 18, going on to represent the Tall Blacks at two Olympic Games (in 2000 and 2004) and four world championships (2002, 2006, 2010 and 2014).

Penney was part of the Tall Blacks' memorable 2002 World Championships campaign as they surprisingly finished fourth. Penney averaged 16.9 points per game and hit 45.5% of his three-point shots.

Penney led New Zealand to victory in the 2009 FIBA Oceania Championship, beating Australia 177–162 on aggregate, after the two-match tie was drawn 1–1. Penney was influential in both games, with 23 points and 4 assists in Game 1, and a 24 points, 7 rebounds and 10 assists in Game 2, thus winning the Al Ramsay Shield.

In the 2010 World Championships in Turkey, Penney was the second leading scorer with 24.7 points per game. New Zealand also went through to the elimination rounds with a 3–2 record.

Penney participated for New Zealand at the 2014 FIBA Basketball World Cup in Spain and averaged 10.8 points and 4.5 rebounds in six games.

In May 2016, Penney retired from international basketball after a career spanning 15 years (1999–2014).

In May 2022, Penney was inducted into the Basketball New Zealand Hall of Fame. In April 2024, he was inducted into the FIBA Hall of Fame.

== Coaching and administrative career ==
In August 2019, Penney was appointed as director of player development and coaching staff consultant at the University of Virginia. His first taste of coaching came under Tony Bennett at Virginia. Penney did not continue with the program following the 2019–20 season due to the COVID-19 pandemic, leaving him stuck in New Zealand after the borders closed.

In November 2023, Penney joined the Wisconsin Badgers men's basketball team as special assistant to the head coach. In April 2024, it was announced that Penney would continue in the special assistant role. In September 2025, prior to the 2025–26 NCAA season, Penney resigned from the Wisconsin men's basketball staff in order to return home to New Zealand.

== Personal life ==
Penney is the brother of Rodd Penney, who is also a professional sportsman, and has played rugby union in New Zealand, England and Italy.

Penney and his wife, Audra, have four children. Audra (née Jeffers) is a former Badgers volleyball player and 2008 team captain. She is from Hartland, Wisconsin. Due to the COVID-19 pandemic, Penney and his family were unable to return to the United States for three years. They returned to Wisconsin in 2023.

== Awards and achievements ==
=== Individual achievements ===
- 1998 New Zealand NBL Rookie of the Year
- 1999 New Zealand NBL Outstanding Kiwi Guard
- 2001–02 First Team All-Big Ten
- 2002–03 First Team All-Big Ten
- 2002–03 Honorable Mention All-American
- 2006–07 Baltic Basketball League All-Star
- 2007–08 All-NBL First Team
- 2008–09 All-NBL First Team
- 2008–09 Australian NBL MVP
- 2009–10 All-NBL First Team
- 2010–11 All-NBL First Team
- 2011 Stanković Cup MVP
- 2012–13 TBL All-Star
- 2012–13 TBL Three-Point Shootout champion
- 2013–14 TBL All-Star
- 2013–14 TBL Three-Point Shootout champion
- 2015–16 All-NBL Second Team

=== Team achievements ===
- 2001–02 Big Ten Champions (Wisconsin)
- 2002–03 Big Ten Champions (Wisconsin)
- 2004–05 NBA Development League Champions (Asheville Altitude)
- 2005–06 Israeli Basketball Premier League Champions (Maccabi Tel Aviv)
- 2005–06 Israeli Basketball State Cup Champions (Maccabi Tel Aviv)
- 2006–07 Lithuanian Basketball League Cup Champions (Žalgiris Kaunas)
- 2010–11 Australian NBL Champions (New Zealand Breakers)

=== New Zealand national team ===
- 2000 William Jones Cup Champions
- 2000 Olympic Games, 11th place
- 2001 Goodwill Games
- 2002 FIBA World Championship, 4th place
- 2004 Olympic Games
- 2006 FIBA World Championship, 16th place
- 2007 Stanković Cup
- 2008 FIBA Olympic Qualifying Tournament
- 2009 FIBA Oceania Championship, 1st place (Gold)
- 2010 FIBA World Championship, 12th place
- 2011 Stanković Cup, 1st place (Gold)
- 2014 FIBA World Championship
