= 2009 FIBA Oceania Championship =

FIBA Oceania Championship 2009
19th FIBA Oceanian Basketball Championship

Tournament details
- Host country: None
- Dates: August 23 – August 25
- Teams: 2 (from 1 federation)
- Venue: 2 (in 2 host cities)

Final positions
- Champions: New Zealand (3rd title)

The FIBA Oceania Championship for Men 2009 was the qualifying tournament of FIBA Oceania for the 2010 FIBA World Championship in Turkey. For the first time, the tournament featured a best-of-two, home-and-away series between Australia and New Zealand. Game one was held in Sydney, New South Wales followed by the second game in Wellington. The two countries split the series, and the tiebreaker, which was won by New Zealand, was the aggregate score. This was New Zealand's second title in an Oceania tournament contested by Australia and third title overall. Australia and New Zealand both qualified for the 2010 FIBA World Championship.

== Venues ==
Sydney	2009 FIBA Oceania Championship (Australia and New Zealand)	Queens Wharf Events Centre
State Sports Centre	2009 FIBA Oceania Championship (Australia and New Zealand)	TSB Arena
Capacity: 5,006	2009 FIBA Oceania Championship (Australia and New Zealand)	Capacity: 4,002

== Results ==
Team 1	Agg.	Team 2	1st leg	2nd leg
Australia	162–177	New Zealand	84–77	78–100

August 23
6:00 p.m.

Report

Australia	84–77	New Zealand
Scoring by quarter: 25-21, 18-21, 18-22, 23-13
Pts: J. Ingles 26; Rebs: N. Jawai 11; Asts: A. Gibson 6		Pts: K. Penney 23; Rebs: M. Vukona 10; Asts: Tait and Penney 4 each

State Sports Centre, Sydney, New South Wales

August 25
7:30 p.m.

Report

New Zealand	100–78	Australia
Scoring by quarter: 17-16, 21-24, 36-15, 26-23
Pts: M. Vukona 25; Rebs: A. Pledger 13; Asts: K. Penney 10		Pts: B. Newley 20; Rebs: N. Jawai 9 Asts: J. Ingles 5
Series tied 1–1, New Zealand wins 177–162 on aggregate

Queens Wharf Events Centre, Wellington

In Game 1, Australia squeezed out a seven-point home victory after trailing by three going into the fourth quarter. Joe Ingles scored ten straight points in a 90-second span in the fourth quarter to help the Boomers take control of the game.

In Game 2, New Zealand needed to win by eight or more to capture the Oceania title. Trailing by two at halftime, the Tall Blacks blew the game open in the third quarter by outscoring the Australians 36–15. Mika Vukona had 25 points and 12 rebounds and Kirk Penney added 24 points, 7 rebounds, and 10 assists to lead the Tall Blacks to their biggest win ever over Australia. With the victory, New Zealand took home the Al Ramsey Shield, given to the Oceanian champions, and will receive a higher seed than the Aussies at the 2010 FIBA World Championship.

2009 Oceanian champions

New Zealand
Third title
