= Tuvalu men's national basketball team =

Basketball team

Tuvalu
- FIBA ranking: ▲ (3 March 2026)
- Joined FIBA: 1987
- FIBA zone: FIBA Oceania
- National federation: Tuvalu Basketball Federation

Olympic Games
- Appearances: None
- Medals: None

FIBA World Cup
- Appearances: None
- Medals: None

Oceanian Championship
- Appearances: None
- Medals: None

The Tuvalu national basketball team are the basketball side that represent Tuvalu in international competitions. They competed at the 2015 Pacific Games, where they finished with a 0–4 record.

== Performance at the Pacific Games ==
- 2015 - 9th place
