= Mika Vukona =

New Zealand basketball player

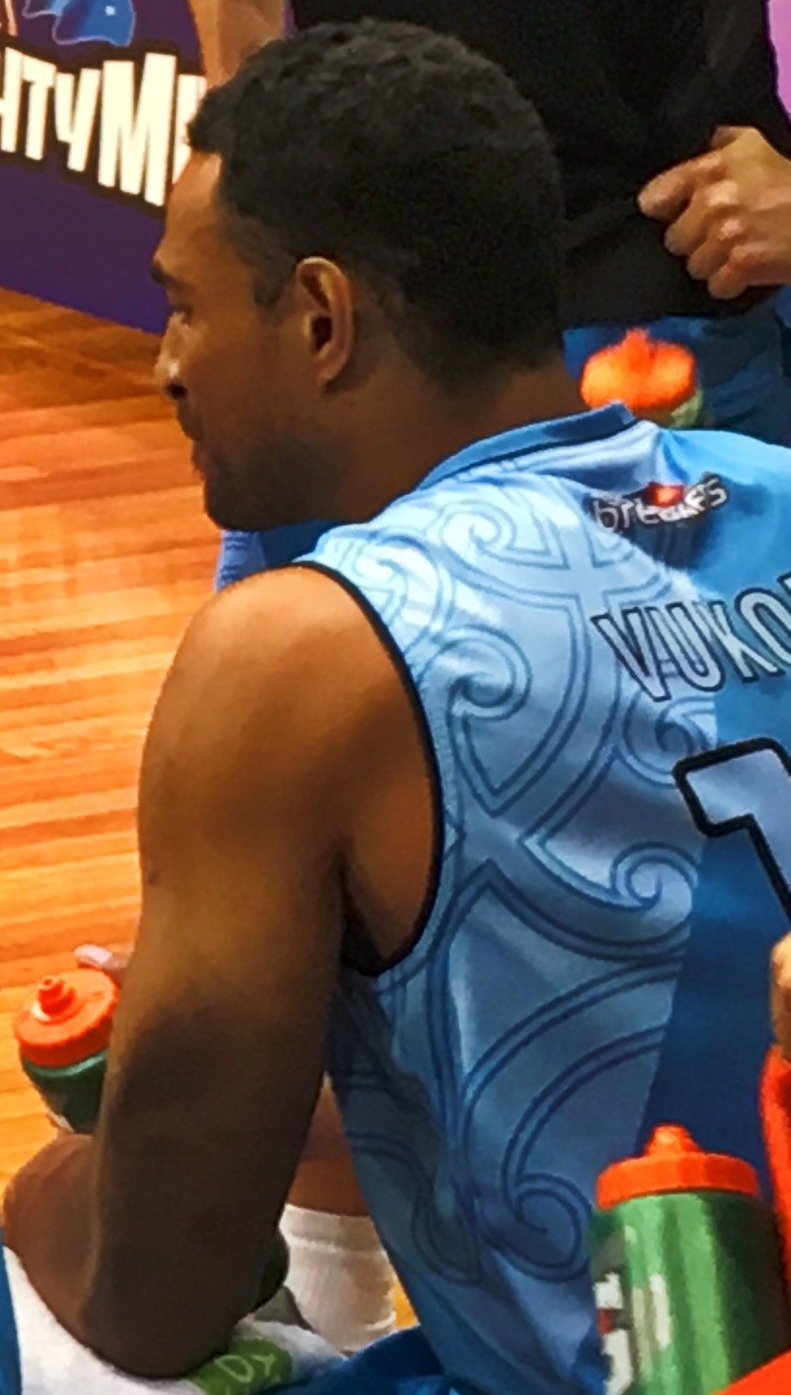
- Vukona with the New Zealand Breakers in 2015

South West Metro Pirates
- Title: General manager
- League: NBL1 North

Personal information
- Born: 13 May 1982 (age 44) Suva, Fiji
- Listed height: 197 cm (6 ft 6 in)
- Listed weight: 103 kg (227 lb)

Career information
- High school: Bethlehem College (Tauranga, New Zealand); Nelson College (Nelson, New Zealand)
- Playing career: 2000–2021
- Position: Power forward
- Coaching career: 2021–2021

Career history

Playing
- 2000–2002: Nelson Giants
- 2003: Manawatu Jets
- 2003–2008: New Zealand Breakers
- 2004–2007: Nelson Giants
- 2008: Harbour Heat
- 2008–2009: South Dragons
- 2009–2010: Gold Coast Blaze
- 2010–2015: Nelson Giants
- 2010–2018: New Zealand Breakers
- 2014: Byblos
- 2015: Virtus Roma
- 2016: Super City Rangers
- 2018–2020: Nelson Giants
- 2018–2020: Brisbane Bullets
- 2020–2021: Southern Districts Spartans

Coaching
- 2021: Southern Districts Spartans (assistant)

Career highlights
- 5× NBL champion (2009, 2011–2013, 2015); 2× All-NBL Second Team (2013, 2014); NZNBL champion (2007); No. 14 retired by Nelson Giants
Medals
Representing New Zealand
Men's basketball
Commonwealth Games
Silver medal – second place	2006 Melbourne	Team competition
Bronze medal – third place	2018 Gold Coast	Team competition

Mika John Vukona (born 13 May 1982) is a Fijian-born New Zealand former professional basketball player. Between 2003 and 2018, he spent 13 seasons with the New Zealand Breakers in the Australian National Basketball League (NBL) and helped them win four championships. He was also a regular with the Nelson Giants in the New Zealand National Basketball League (NZNBL) and was a long-time New Zealand Tall Black.

== Early life ==
Vukona was born in Suva, Fiji. He was adopted by his birth mother's brother, Clem, a Fijian. Clem and his wife Marion, a New Zealander, moved their family to New Zealand in 1987 following the Fiji coup. They settled down in the coastal city of Tauranga, Marion's hometown.

Vukona attended Bethlehem College in Tauranga for both primary and secondary school. He played rugby until third form at Bethlehem College, when his anti-rugby mother forced him to stop. He subsequently followed his brother's footsteps and took up basketball. He went on to become a member of the national under 16, 18 and 20 sides. Basketball took him to Nelson in his final school year after earning a scholarship to go to Nelson College.

== Playing career ==
=== Australian NBL ===
Vukona made his debut in the Australian NBL as a development player during the New Zealand Breakers' inaugural season in 2003–04. He was elevated from a development player to a full-time contracted player for the 2005–06 season. He played five seasons for the Breakers before joining the South Dragons in 2008. He won a championship with the Dragons in 2008–09. After the Dragons collapsed, Vukona joined the Gold Coast Blaze for the 2009–10 season.

In 2010, Vukona made a return to the Breakers, and over the next five seasons, he helped the team win four championships, including three straight between 2010–11 and 2012–13. The 2015–16 season saw the Breakers play in a fifth grand final in six years, where they lost to the Perth Wildcats. In November 2017, Vukona played his 400th NBL game. After eight seasons with the Breakers, Vukona joined the Brisbane Bullets in 2018. Vukona ended the 2018–19 season on 449 games after tearing his Achilles in game one of the Bullets' semi-final series against the Wildcats and thus missing game two. His contract with the Bullets ended at the end of the 2019–20 season.

=== New Zealand NBL, QSL/NBL1, Lebanon and Italy ===
Vukona made his New Zealand NBL debut in 2000. He played for the Nelson Giants between 2000 and 2002 before playing for the Manawatu Jets in 2003. He then played for the Giants between 2004 and 2007 before playing for the Harbour Heat in 2008. He played for the Giants between 2010 and 2015, then with the Super City Rangers in 2016, and then again with the Giants in 2018, 2019 and 2020.

In April 2014, Vukona ventured outside New Zealand or Australia for the first time, joining Lebanese team Byblos. Twelve months later, he moved to Italy to play for Virtus Roma.

In 2020, Vukona played for the Southern Districts Spartans of the Queensland State League (QSL). In 2021, he served as an assistant coach for the Spartans in the NBL1 North and joined the playing squad midway through the season.

In June 2023, Vukona's number 14 jersey was retired by the Nelson Giants.

=== National team ===
Vukona debuted for the Tall Blacks in 2005. He retired from international duties in February 2021 after 152 games for the Tall Blacks.

== Executive career ==
=== Tasmania JackJumpers ===
In March 2021, Vukona joined the Tasmania JackJumpers' basketball programme as a consultant. He was elevated to a full time capacity as general manager of basketball operations on 31 October 2023. He parted ways with the JackJumpers in May 2025.

=== Franklin Bulls ===
Vukona served as general manager of the Franklin Bulls during the 2023 New Zealand NBL season.

=== South West Metro Pirates ===
In May 2025, Vukona joined the South West Metro Pirates of the NBL1 North as their general manager.

== Personal life ==
Vukona and his wife Vanessa have two children. Vukona holds a Fijian passport.
