= Kiribati men's national basketball team =

Kiribati
- FIBA ranking: NR (3 March 2026)
- Joined FIBA: 1987
- FIBA zone: FIBA Oceania
- National federation: Kiribati Basketball Federation

Olympic Games
- Appearances: None
- Medals: None

FIBA World Cup
- Appearances: None
- Medals: None

Oceanian Championship
- Appearances: None
- Medals: None

The Kiribati national basketball team are the basketball side that represent Kiribati in international competitions. They are a member of FIBA Oceania. The team competed at the 2015 Pacific Games, where they finished with a 0–4 record.

== Performance at the Pacific Games ==
- 2015 - 9th place
