= Vladimir Radmanović =

Serbian basketball player (born 1980)

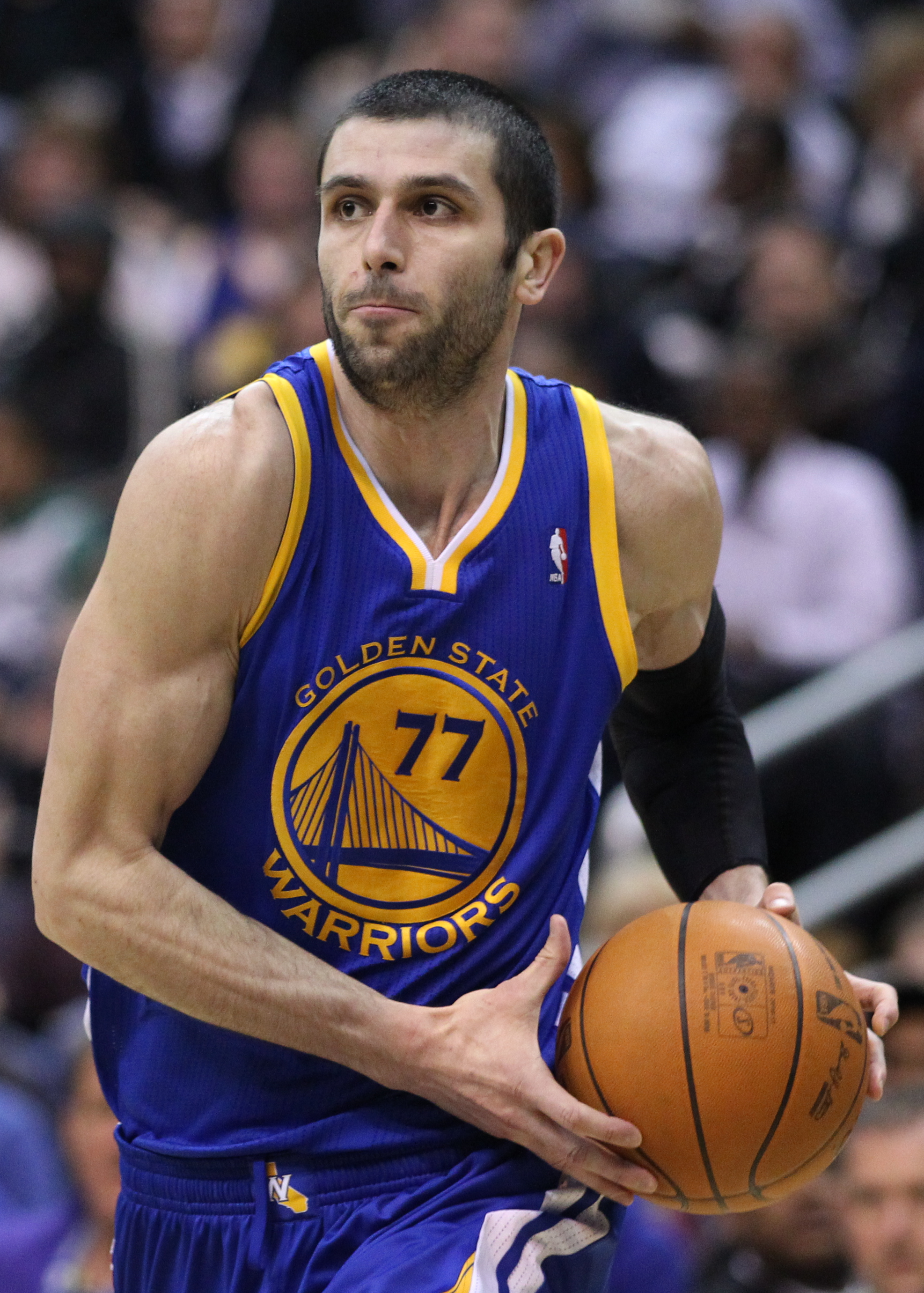
- Radmanović with the Golden State Warriors in 2011

Personal information
- Born: 19 November 1980 (age 45) Trebinje, SR Bosnia and Herzegovina, SFR Yugoslavia
- Listed height: 6 ft 10 in (2.08 m)
- Listed weight: 235 lb (107 kg)

Career information
- NBA draft: 2001: 1st round, 12th overall pick
- Drafted by: Seattle SuperSonics
- Playing career: 1997–2013
- Position: Power forward / small forward
- Number: 7, 77, 10

Career history
- 1997–2001: Crvena zvezda
- 2001: FMP
- 2001–2006: Seattle SuperSonics
- 2006: Los Angeles Clippers
- 2006–2009: Los Angeles Lakers
- 2009: Charlotte Bobcats
- 2009–2011: Golden State Warriors
- 2011–2012: Atlanta Hawks
- 2012–2013: Chicago Bulls

Career highlights
- NBA All-Rookie Second Team (2002); Serbian and Montenegrin League champion (1998)

Career statistics
- Points: 5,879 (8.0 ppg)
- Rebounds: 2,784 (3.8 rpg)
- Assists: 998 (1.4 apg)
- Stats at NBA.com
- Stats at Basketball Reference

Vladimir Radmanović (Serbian Cyrillic: Владимир Радмановић; born 19 November 1980) is a Serbian former professional basketball player.

In Serbia he played for Crvena zvezda and FMP and in the National Basketball Association (NBA) he was a member of the Seattle SuperSonics, Los Angeles Clippers, Los Angeles Lakers, Charlotte Bobcats, Golden State Warriors, Atlanta Hawks and Chicago Bulls.

Radmanović also represented his national team most notably at the 2002 FIBA World Championship.

== Early life ==
Radmanović was born into a Serb family in the eastern Herzegovinian city of Trebinje in SR Bosnia and Herzegovina, SFR Yugoslavia (modern Bosnia and Herzegovina) where his father Stevan (a JNA colonel) was stationed at the time. His family originates however from the Dalmatian coastal town of Zadar in Croatia. Radmanović grew up in various locales dictated by the requirements of his father's profession.

== Playing career ==
=== Yugoslavia ===
In Yugoslavia, Radmanović played basketball for KK Crvena zvezda and KK FMP. During the NATO bombing of Yugoslavia in 1999, Radmanović played at the Nike Hoop Summit in Tampa for which he was called up during the regular season.

He entered the NBA in 2001.

=== Seattle SuperSonics ===
Radmanović was selected by the Seattle SuperSonics as the 12th pick of 2001 NBA draft. Although a consistent contributor throughout his first two seasons, Radmanović became a candidate for the NBA Most Improved Player Award in the 2003–04 season. That season he averaged 12 points and 5.3 rebounds per game mostly as a sixth man. He also established himself as an above average three-point shooter, making around 40% of his attempts, a skill that was rare for a player of his size at the time.

He was integral to the Sonics' success in the 2004–05 season as a sixth man. He averaged 11.8 points per game and 4.6 rebounds, helping the Sonics win their first-round playoff matchup against the Sacramento Kings. On January 26, 2005, he made a career-high 8 three-point field goals against the Los Angeles Lakers.

After the 2004–05 season, Radmanović turned down a six-year, $42 million contract offer to re-sign with the Sonics, and instead decided to sign a one-year deal, making him an unrestricted free agent after next season.

He was nicknamed "Broadway Joe" by SuperSonics announcer Kevin Calabro, after his resemblance to NFL quarterback Joe Namath.

=== Los Angeles Clippers ===
After voicing his frustration for not being a starter, on February 14, 2006, Radmanović was traded from the SuperSonics to the Los Angeles Clippers for power forward Chris Wilcox.

The change of venue greatly improved his performance. Radmanović averaged 10.7 ppg, a career-best averages of 5.7 rpg and 2.1 apg, while shooting 41.8% of his three-pointers.

=== Los Angeles Lakers ===
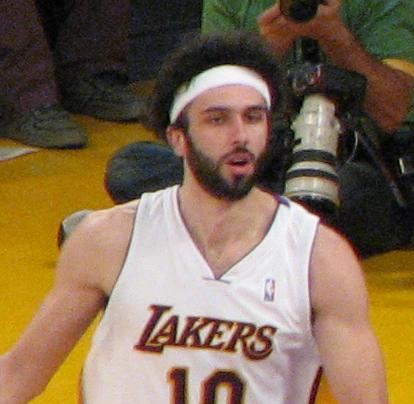
Radmanović with the Lakers in 2007

On July 13, 2006, Radmanović signed with the Los Angeles Lakers. Although he was believed to be a lock to re-sign with the Los Angeles Clippers (he at first accepted their offer at an estimated $31M over five years), he changed his mind after being promised a starting job with the Los Angeles Lakers. Although the Lakers were offering the same amount of money as Clippers, Radmanović was persuaded to join the team by Kobe Bryant, Phil Jackson, Magic Johnson and his good friend, Vlade Divac, who were all convinced his shooting and playing opportunities would greatly increase in the Lakers' triangle offense. Jackson has also called Vladimir a "space cadet" and "my favorite Martian" in reference to his being out of position and taking wild three-point shots. He was also referred to as "Vlad Rad." He started all 21 games in the 2007–08 Playoffs for the Lakers, and was high scorer for one game and high rebounder for several games.

==== Snowboarding injury ====
On February 18, 2007, Radmanović told the Lakers that he had separated his shoulder, when he fell on a patch of ice in Park City, Utah, the day before, during the weekend of the 2007 NBA All-Star Game and would be out for approximately eight weeks.

However, on February 23, 2007, Radmanović revealed that he had actually hurt himself in a fall while snowboarding. Radmanović's Lakers contract banned him from taking part in activities that involve significant risk of injury, including skiing and snowboarding. An NBA league source said that voiding the contract would be extremely unlikely, with a suspension or fine more likely. This proved to be true, as he was fined $500,000 for lying about the injury.

=== Later NBA career ===
On February 7, 2009, Radmanović was traded to the Charlotte Bobcats in exchange for forward Adam Morrison and guard Shannon Brown. Bobcats general manager Rod Higgins said Radmanović would likely play both small and power forward.

On November 16, 2009, Radmanović was traded to the Golden State Warriors along with Raja Bell in exchange for Stephen Jackson and Acie Law.

On December 9, 2011, Radmanović was signed by the Atlanta Hawks. In the Hawks' first game of the season on December 26, 2011, Radmanović scored 17 points with four steals and five assists in 27 minutes.

On July 19, 2012, Radmanović signed a one-year deal with the Chicago Bulls. Radmanović's final NBA game was played in Game 2 of the Eastern Conference Semi-Finals on May 8, 2013, where the Bulls lost to the Miami Heat 78 - 115. Radmanović recorded 9 points, 1 assist and 2 steals in his final game. The Heat would go on to defeat the Chicago Bulls in 5 games, eliminating the Bulls from the playoffs.

In October 2013, Radmanović announced his retirement. After 12 seasons in the NBA, he appeared in 737 regular season games, shot 37.8 percent from three, and averaged 8.0 points in roughly 22 minutes per game.

== International career ==
Radmanović played for the senior team of FR Yugoslavia/Serbia and Montenegro at three major tournaments.

=== 2002 World Championship ===
Radmanović was set to debut for the senior national team at the 2001 EuroBasket but he turned down a call-up from coach Svetislav Pešić in order to focus on preparing to enter the NBA.

Radmanović made his debut for the senior side at the 2002 FIBA World Championship in Indianapolis where Yugoslavia won gold. Radmanović (and his Seattle teammate Predrag Drobnjak) did not see many minutes at the tournament, entering the court in only three games. During half-time of the semifinals against New Zealand in which the favored Yugoslavia was losing, coach Svetislav Pešić angrily ostracized Radmanović from the team because Radmanović was eating a banana in the change room while Pešić was giving instructions. Radmanović watched the rest of the game from the stands while Yugoslavia won in an uncertain finish. Radmanović didn't play in the final against Argentina either as Yugoslavia won 84–77. After the final, there was another controversy at the podium during the medal ceremony as Pešić instructed Aleksandar Smiljanić (who was on the preliminary roster but did not make the final cut) to put on Radmanović's jersey and to receive a medal instead of Radmanović. Radmanović later called the tournament a "big experience" for him.

=== 2004 Olympics ===
Radmanović skipped out on the 2003 EuroBasket but he did take part in the 2004 Olympic tournament where Serbia and Montenegro was eliminated in the preliminary round.

Radmanović was coming off of an excellent season with Seattle and the return of Željko Obradović as national team head coach brought back enthusiasm to both players and fans alike. Radmanović played an excellent first game at the tournament, scoring 21 points against Argentina but an unbelievable last-second shot from Manu Ginóbili defeated the Serbia and Montenegro side by a score of 83–82. In the next game, Serbia and Montenegro defeated future silver medalist Italy but the next few games after that were debacles. Namely, Serbia and Montenegro lost against New Zealand, Spain and in the end against China in the game that would have advanced them further. Radmanović's minutes and contribution decreased as the tournament progressed. Serbia and Montenegro ended up defeating Angola in the classification game for 11th place held in Athens. The 11th-place finish was the worst in the country's Olympic basketball history.

=== 2005 EuroBasket ===
Radmanović participated at the 2005 EuroBasket.

The 2005 EuroBasket held in Serbia and Montenegro ended up being the last international tournament Radmanović would take part in. In the deciding game against France, Radmanović went 4/5 from the three-point line but coach Obradović subbed him off the court when the game was being decided. Serbia and Montenegro lost that game 74–71 and bowed out of the tournament in the play-off round of the knockout stage. In four games played, Radmanović averaged 9 points and 2.5 rebounds per game. After their poor outing at the tournament, coach Obradović accused a few players for an irresponsible approach to the national team.

Prior to EuroBasket 2007, Radmanović said that he "won't accept a call-up only to sit on the bench and watch others play."

== NBA career statistics ==
Legend
GP	Games played	GS	Games started	MPG	Minutes per game
FG%	Field goal percentage	3P%	3-point field goal percentage	FT%	Free throw percentage
RPG	Rebounds per game	APG	Assists per game	SPG	Steals per game
BPG	Blocks per game	PPG	Points per game	**Bold**	Career high

=== Regular season ===
Year	Team	GP	GS	MPG	FG%	3P%	FT%	RPG	APG	SPG	BPG	PPG
2001–02	Seattle	61	16	20.2	.412	.420	.681	3.8	1.3	.9	.4	6.7
2002–03	Seattle	72	16	26.5	.410	.355	.706	4.5	1.3	.9	.3	10.1
2003–04	Seattle	**77**	38	**30.1**	.425	.371	.748	5.3	1.8	**1.04**	.5	**12.0**
2004–05	Seattle	63	0	29.5	.409	.389	.786	4.6	1.4	.9	.5	11.8
2005–06	Seattle	47	16	23.2	.401	.367	**.887**	4.0	1.5	.7	.3	9.3
2005–06	L.A. Clippers	30	11	29.5	.417	.418	.731	**5.7**	**2.1**	.97	.5	10.7
2006–07	L.A. Lakers	55	15	17.9	.424	.339	.726	3.3	1.2	.5	.3	6.6
2007–08	L.A. Lakers	65	**41**	22.8	**.453**	.406	.800	3.3	1.9	.7	.2	8.4
2008–09	L.A. Lakers	46	28	16.8	.444	**.441**	.852	2.5	.8	.6	.2	5.9
2008–09	Charlotte	32	3	21.1	.401	.357	.645	3.3	1.3	.6	.3	8.3
2009–10	Charlotte	8	0	16.6	.333	.318	.667	3.6	.9	.4	.1	4.9
2009–10	Golden State	33	20	23.0	.385	.267	.762	4.5	1.2	.8	.2	6.6
2010–11	Golden State	74	6	15.8	.431	.405	.882	2.9	1.1	.6	**.6**	5.1
2011–12	Atlanta	49	3	15.4	.376	.370	.759	2.9	1.1	.4	.3	4.5
2012–13	Chicago	25	0	5.8	.302	.185	.667	1.1	.3	.3	.2	1.3
**Career**		737	213	21.9	.415	.378	.758	3.8	1.4	.7	.4	8.0

=== Playoffs ===
Year	Team	GP	GS	MPG	FG%	3P%	FT%	RPG	APG	SPG	BPG	PPG
2002	Seattle	5	2	22.6	.438	.538	**1.000**	3.6	1.0	.2	.2	7.6
2005	Seattle	6	0	20.3	.371	.238	.500	3.0	.5	.7	**.5**	5.3
2006	L.A. Clippers	12	2	20.5	.470	.463	.696	**4.0**	1.1	.6	**.5**	8.1
2008	L.A. Lakers	**21**	**21**	**22.9**	.444	.372	.833	3.8	**1.5**	.6	.0	8.0
2012	Atlanta	2	0	7.5	.000	.000	.000	.5	.5	.0	.0	.0
2013	Chicago	1	0	10.0	**1.000**	**1.000**	.000	.0	1.0	**2.0**	.0	**9.0**
**Career**		47	25	21.0	.440	.396	.735	3.5	1.1	.6	.2	7.3

== See also ==
- List of European basketball players in the United States
- List of Serbian NBA players
