= Iran men's national basketball team =

Men's national basketball team representing Iran

Iran
- FIBA ranking: 28 ▼2 (1 September 2026)
- Joined FIBA: 1947
- FIBA zone: FIBA Asia
- National federation: IRIBF
- Coach: Sotiris Manolopoulos
- Nickname(s): Team Melli (The National Team)

Olympic Games
- Appearances: 3

FIBA World Cup
- Appearances: 4

FIBA Asia Cup
- Appearances: 19
- Medals: (gold) Gold: (2007, 2009, 2013); (silver) Silver: (2017); (bronze) Bronze: (2015, 2025)
- Retired numbers: 1 (15)
Home	Away

First international
- France 62–30 Iran (London, United Kingdom; 1 August 1948)

Biggest win
- Iran 141–29 Maldives (Medina, Saudi Arabia; 10 April 2005)

Biggest defeat
- South Korea 116–54 Iran (Manila, Philippines; 4 December 1973)
Medal record
FIBA Asia Cup
Gold medal – first place	2007 Japan
Gold medal – first place	2009 China
Gold medal – first place	2013 Philippines
Silver medal – second place	2017 Lebanon
Bronze medal – third place	2015 China
Bronze medal – third place	2025 Saudi Arabia
Asian Games
Silver medal – second place	2014 Incheon	Team
Silver medal – second place	2018 Jakarta	Team
Bronze medal – third place	1951 New Delhi	Team
Bronze medal – third place	2006 Doha	Team
Bronze medal – third place	2010 Guangzhou	Team
Bronze medal – third place	2026 Aichi-Nagoya	Team
FIBA Asia Challenge
Gold medal – first place	2012 Tokyo
Gold medal – first place	2014 Wuhan
Gold medal – first place	2016 Tehran

The Iran men’s national basketball team (Persian: تیم ملی بسکتبال مردان ایران) represents Iran in international basketball, and is governed by the Islamic Republic of Iran Basketball Federation (IRIBF).

Iran is one of Asia’s most successful federations. Since the turn of the century, they’ve won three FIBA Asia Cup tournaments, while also claiming a silver and two bronze medals at the competition. Iran has also qualified for every edition of the FIBA World Cup since 2010, and have participated in two Olympic Games (2008, 2020).

== History ==
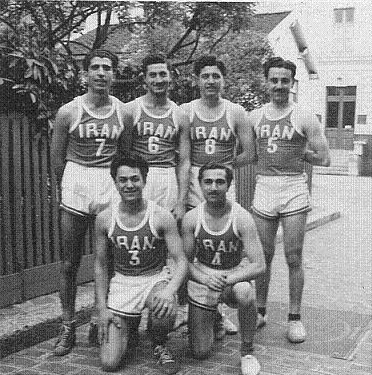
iran team in 1948 summer Olympic

=== Early years ===
In 1948, the Iran national basketball team participated in th London Olympics, their first appearance in the competition. In 1951, Iran participated in the first Asian Games held in Delhi and placed third in Asia. In 1959, Iran participated in the EuroBasket held in Turkey.

=== 2007 FIBA Asia Championship ===
Placed in the dreaded "Group of Death" alongside China, the Philippines, and Jordan, the Iranians won all three group matches to make it to the next round. In the quarterfinals, Iran went 2–1, to make it to semifinals, following victories over Chinese Taipei and Qatar, and then routed Kazakhstan, 75–62, in the semifinals.

The Iranians then beat Lebanon 74–69, with Hamed Haddadi scoring 31 points. Not only did it avenge an 82–60 defeat in the quarterfinals, they also became the first Western Asian team to win the tournament, and thus make it to the 2008 Beijing Olympics.

=== 2008 Beijing Olympic Games ===
In being crowned the 2007 Asian Champions, the Iranians qualified for the 2008 Beijing games for the first time in 60 years. The Olympic experience led to a flurry of opportunities for the Iranian players, as they traveled across the world in preparation for the games, including a visit to the US. They also defeated Serbia (72–70) before the start of the tournament in 2008 FIBA Diamond Ball.Iran was placed in Group A, along with Lithuania, Russia, Argentina, Croatia, and Australia, suffering five defeats. The Olympic experience opened doors for players such as Hamed Haddadi, and Iranian captain Samad Nikkhah Bahrami to play in the NBA (National Basketball Association) and sign in the top French League.

Haddadi finished with averages of 16.6 points per game, 11.2 rebounds per game, and 2.6 blocks per game, leading the entire tournament in the latter two categories. His highlight performance was in the game against Argentina when he put up 21 points and 16 rebounds.

=== 2009 FIBA Asia Championship ===
Winning the FIBA Asia Championship 2009 at Tianjin, China, was a sign on continuing progress in basketball.Iran won all three group matches against Chinese Taipei, Kuwait, Uzbekistan to make it to the next round.In the second round Iran Won Japan, Philippines and South Korea.In the Quarterfinals Iran wins Qatar and in Semifinals Iran wins Jordan.Iran defeated China, by a score of 70–52 in the final.

=== 2010 FIBA World Championship ===
Iran's second consecutive FIBA Asia Championship gave them their first ever FIBA World Championship berth, at the 2010 FIBA World Championship.The team lost against USA, Brazil, Croatia, Slovenia and one win against Tunisia.Iran finished 1–4 in Group B, for 19th place.

=== 2013 FIBA Asia Championship ===
Winning the 2013 FIBA Asia Championship at Manila, Philippines, was a sign that the Iranian team has forgot the tragedy of their loss to Jordan in last tournament, 2011 FIBA Asia Championship, and reclaimed the top place in the FIBA Asia. Iran defeated the charged up hosts Philippines by an 85–71 win in the final. Iranian center Hamed Haddadi, who played a stellar role in Iran's triumph at the 27th FIBA Asia Championship, became the most accomplished individual player of the competition winning two awards, including that of the MVP. Iran was the only team with two awards in the All Stars with Oshin Sahakian named for the Power Forward position.

=== 2014 FIBA World Cup ===
In the 2014 FIBA World Cup in Spain, Iran national basketball team was grouped with Spain, Egypt, Serbia, Brazil and France in Group A.Iran national basketball team, in its first meeting in the opening game, faced Spain, the world's second-ranked team, and succumbed to defeat.On the sixth day of the 2014 FIBA World Cup and in its last match of the preliminary stage, Iran faced the French and succumbed to defeat, and finally ranked 21st with 4 losses and one win against Egypt. Iran lost against France and Serbia.

=== 2019 FIBA World Cup ===
In the 2019 FIBA World Cup of China, which was held in Asia for the first time, the Iran team was grouped in Group C with the teams of Spain, Puerto Rico and Tunisia. They lost all three games and competed with the Angolan and Philippine teams to rank 17–32 (for the first time in this period, 32 teams participated) and won both matches. Thanks to the goal difference, they finished ahead of China, which had lost against Nigeria, and went to the Tokyo Olympics as the best Asian team.

=== 2020 Tokyo Olympic Games ===
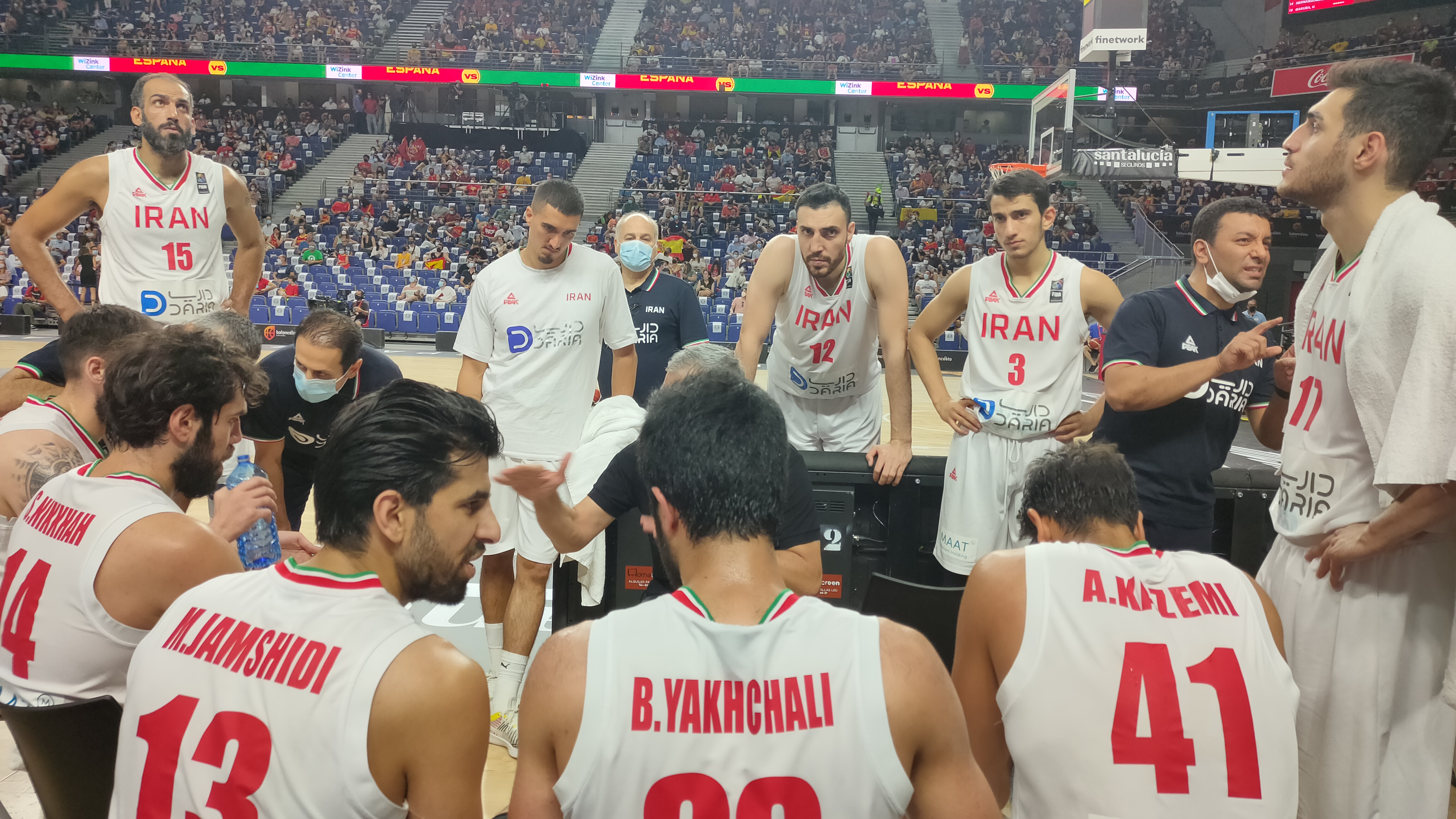
Iran national team in 2021, during a time out in a friendly against Spain.

Iran is in group A of the competitions along with the US, France, and Czech.Iranian men’s basketball team conceded a 78–84 defeat against Czech at the opening match of the basketball competitions of the 2020 Tokyo Olympics.In their second game at the Olympics, Iranian basketball players lost to the US 66–120.Iran’s national basketball team finished the campaign in the 2020 Olympics with a 79–62 loss against France at Saitama Super Arena.Iran, in its three appearance at the Olympics, conceded three defeats in Group A.

=== 2023 FIBA World Cup ===
Iran was only one of three teams at the World Cup 2023 to go home without a win. Finishing bottom in Group G after resounding defeats to Brazil, Côte d'Ivoire and Spain. Further disappointment was to follow in the classification games against France and Lebanon. After the final play of their campaign, one man took centre stage, Hamed Haddadi, bidding a final farewell after 4 consecutive World Cup runs with Iran. At the other end of his career is Mohammad Amini. The 18-years-old who plays for AS Monaco Basket, played 30 minutes a game and was Iran's top tournament scorer.

== Competitive record ==
=== Olympic Games ===
Summer Olympic Games record
Year	Round	Rank	M	W	L	PF	PA	PD	Squad
(Germany) 1936	Did not enter								
(United Kingdom) 1948	13th place match	14th place	7	2	5	199	366	−167	Squad
(Finland) 1952	Did not enter								
(Australia) 1956	Did not enter								
(Italy) 1960	Did not enter								
(Japan) 1964	Did not enter								
(Mexico) 1968	Did not enter								
(West Germany) 1972	Did not enter								
(Canada) 1976	Did not enter								
(Soviet Union) 1980	Boycotted the event								
(United States) 1984	Boycotted the event								
(South Korea) 1988	Did not enter								
(Spain) 1992	Did not qualify								
(United States) 1996	Did not qualify								
(Australia) 2000	Did not qualify								
(Greece) 2004	Did not qualify								
(China) 2008	Preliminary round	11th place	5	0	5	323	464	−141	Squad
(United Kingdom) 2012	Did not qualify								
(Brazil) 2016	Did not qualify								
(Japan) 2020	Preliminary round	12th place	3	0	3	206	283	−77	Squad
(France) 2024	Did not qualify								
(United States) 2028	Future events								
(Australia) 2032	Future events								
Total	3/20		15	2	13	728	1,113	−385	—

=== FIBA World Cup ===
FIBA World Cup record										Qualification record					
Year	Round	Rank	M	W	L	PF	PA	PD	Squad	M	W	L	PF	PA	PD
(Argentina) 1950	Did not enter									Via Wild Card					
(Brazil) 1954	Did not enter									Via Wild Card					
(Chile) 1959	Did not enter									Via Wild Card					
(Brazil) 1963	Did not enter									Via Wild Card					
(Uruguay) 1967	Did not enter									Via FIBA Asia Cup					
(Socialist Federal Republic of Yugoslavia) 1970	Did not enter									Via FIBA Asia Cup					
(Puerto Rico) 1974	Did not qualify									Via FIBA Asia Cup					
(Philippines) 1978	Did not enter									Via FIBA Asia Cup					
(Colombia) 1982	Did not qualify									Via FIBA Asia Cup					
(Spain) 1986	Did not qualify									Via FIBA Asia Cup					
(Argentina) 1990	Did not qualify									Via FIBA Asia Cup					
(Canada) 1994	Did not qualify									Via FIBA Asia Cup					
(Greece) 1998	Did not qualify									Via FIBA Asia Cup					
(United States) 2002	Did not qualify									Via FIBA Asia Cup					
(Japan) 2006	Did not qualify									Via FIBA Asia Cup					
(Turkey) 2010	Preliminary round	19th	5	1	4	301	367	−66	Squad	Via FIBA Asia Cup					
(Spain) 2014	Preliminary round	20th	5	1	4	344	406	−62	Squad	Via FIBA Asia Cup					
(China) 2019	17th–32nd Classification	23rd	5	2	3	379	372	+7	Squad	12	8	4	890	811	+79
(Philippines) (Japan) (Indonesia) 2023	17th–32nd Classification	31st	5	0	5	321	419	−98	Squad	12	6	6	856	824	+32
(Qatar) 2027	To be determined									8	5	3	599	542	+57
(France) 2031	To be determined									To be determined					
Total	4/19		20	4	16	1,345	1,564	−219	—	32	19	13	2,345	2,177	+168

=== FIBA Asia Cup ===
FIBA Asia Cup record										Qualification record					
Year	Round	Rank	M	W	L	PF	PA	PD	Squad	M	W	L	PF	PA	PD
(Philippines) 1960	Did not enter									No qualification					
(Taiwan) 1963	Did not enter									No qualification					
(Malaysia) 1965	Did not enter									No qualification					
(South Korea) 1967	Did not enter									No qualification					
(Thailand) 1969	Did not enter									No qualification					
(Japan) 1971	Did not enter									No qualification					
(Philippines) 1973	Championship	5th place	10	4	6	798	899	-101	Squad	No qualification					
(Thailand) 1975	Did not enter									No qualification					
(Malaysia) 1977	Did not enter									No qualification					
(Japan) 1979	Did not enter									No qualification					
(India) 1981	Classification 7th–12th	8th place	7	3	4	653	648	+5	Squad	No qualification					
(Hong Kong) 1983	Classification 5th–8th	5th place	6	5	1	421	365	+56	Squad	No qualification					
(Malaysia) 1985	Classification 5th–8th	8th place	6	2	4	467	482	-5	Squad	No qualification					
(Thailand) 1987	Did not enter									No qualification					
(China) 1989	5th place game	5th place	7	4	3	613	614	-1	Squad	No qualification					
(Japan) 1991	5th place game	6th place	8	4	4	680	650	+30	Squad	No qualification					
(Indonesia) 1993	4th place game	4th place	6	4	2	489	465	+24	Squad	No qualification					
(South Korea) 1995	9th place game	10th place	8	5	3	594	505	+89	Squad	No qualification					
(Saudi Arabia) 1997	7th place game	8th place	7	3	4	510	579	-69	Squad	No qualification					
(Japan) 1999	Did not qualify									Via WABA Championship or FIBA Asia Challenge					
(China) 2001	Did not qualify									Via WABA Championship or FIBA Asia Challenge					
(China) 2003	5th place game	5th place	7	4	3	538	577	-19	Squad	Via WABA Championship or FIBA Asia Challenge					
(Qatar) 2005	5th place game	6th place	8	4	4	562	512	+50	Squad	Via WABA Championship or FIBA Asia Challenge					
(Japan) 2007	Final	Champions	8	7	1	592	555	+37	Squad	Via WABA Championship or FIBA Asia Challenge					
(China) 2009	Final	Champions	9	9	0	767	581	+186	Squad	Via WABA Championship or FIBA Asia Challenge					
(China) 2011	5th place game	5th place	9	8	1	947	516	+431	Squad	Via WABA Championship or FIBA Asia Challenge					
(Philippines) 2013	Final	Champions	9	9	0	781	489	+292	Squad	Via WABA Championship or FIBA Asia Challenge					
(China) 2015	3rd place game	3rd place	9	7	2	774	542	+232	Squad	Via WABA Championship or FIBA Asia Challenge					
(Lebanon) 2017	Final	Runners-up	6	5	1	494	418	+76	Squad	Via WABA Championship or FIBA Asia Challenge					
(Indonesia) 2022	Quarterfinals	5th place	4	3	1	340	294	+46	Squad	6	5	1	484	351	+133
(Saudi Arabia) 2025	3rd place game	3rd place	6	5	1	442	405	+37	Squad	6	5	1	453	305	+148
Total	3 titles	19/31	140	95	45	11,462	10,066	+1,396	—	12	10	2	937	656	+281

=== Asian Games ===
Asian Games record
Year	Round	Rank	M	W	L	PF	PA	PD	Squad
(India) 1951	Round-robin	3rd place	4	2	2	222	195	+27	Squad
(Philippines) 1954	Did not enter								
(Japan) 1958	Did not enter								
(Indonesia) 1962	Did not enter								
(Thailand) 1966	7th place game	7th place	7	3	4	543	575	-32	Squad
(Thailand) 1970	7th place game	7th place	8	6	2	740	668	+72	Squad
(Iran) 1974	5th place game	6th place	7	3	4	643	580	+63	Squad
(Thailand) 1978	Did not enter								
(India) 1982	Did not enter								
(South Korea) 1986	Did not enter								
(China) 1990	7th place game	7th place	6	3	3	466	499	-33	Squad
(Japan) 1994	7th place game	8th place	6	2	4	498	530	-32	Squad
(Thailand) 1998	7th place game	7th place	6	2	4	452	465	-13	Squad
(South Korea) 2002	Did not enter								
(Qatar) 2006	Bronze medal game	3rd place	8	5	3	632	581	+51	Squad
(China) 2010	Bronze medal game	3rd place	8	6	2	566	461	+105	Squad
(South Korea) 2014	Gold medal game	Runners-up	7	6	1	565	456	+109	Squad
(Indonesia) 2018	Gold medal game	Runners-up	4	3	1	313	274	+39	Squad
(China) 2022	Classification 5th–6th	5th place	6	5	1	512	409	+103	Squad
(Japan) 2026	Bronze medal game	3rd place	6	4	2	415	417	–2	Squad
Total	13/20		83	50	33	6,567	6,110	+457	—

=== FIBA Asia Challenge ===
FIBA Asia Challenge record (Defunct)
Year	Round	Rank	M	W	L	PF	PA	PD	Squad
(Taiwan) 2004	Qualified but withdrew								
(Kuwait) 2008	Qualified but withdrew								
(Lebanon) 2010	5th place game	6th place	7	3	4	500	504	-4	Squad (Note: Iran played with their "B" team.)
(Japan) 2012	Final	Champions	7	7	0	519	422	+97	Squad
(China) 2014	Final	Champions	7	6	1	496	410	+86	Squad
(Iran) 2016	Final	Champions	8	8	0	670	402	+268	Squad
Total	3 titles	4/6	29	24	5	2,185	1,738	+447	—

=== FIBA Diamond Ball ===
FIBA Diamond Ball record (Defunct)
Year	Round	Rank	M	W	L	PF	PA	PD	Squad
(Hong Kong) 2000	Did not qualify								
(Serbia and Montenegro) 2004	Did not qualify								
(China) 2008	3rd place game	4th place	3	1	2	0	0	0	Squad
Total	1/3		3	1	2	189	226	-37	—

=== West Asian Championship ===
WABA Championship record (Defunct)
Year	Round	Rank	M	W	L	Squad
(Lebanon) 1999	Round-robin	4th place	4	1	3	Squad
(Lebanon) 2000	Round-robin	4th place	4	2	2	Squad
(Jordan) 2001	Round-robin	3rd place	4	2	2	Squad
(Jordan) (Iran) 2002	Round-robin	Runners-up	4	3	1	Squad
(Iran) 2004	Round-robin	Champions	4	4	0	Squad
(Lebanon) 2005	Round-robin	Champions	4	4	0	Squad
(Jordan) 2008	Did not enter					
(Iraq) 2010	Round-robin	Champions	3	3	0	Squad
(Iraq) 2011	Round-robin	Champions	3	3	0	Squad
(Jordan) 2012	Round-robin	Runners-up	5	4	1	Squad
(Iran) 2013	Round-robin	Champions	3	3	0	Squad
(Jordan) 2014	Round-robin	Runners-up	5	4	1	Squad (Note: Iran played with their "U18" team.)
(Jordan) 2015	Did not enter					
(Jordan) 2016	Round-robin	Champions	4	4	0	Squad
(Jordan) 2017	Round-robin	Runners-up	5	4	1	Squad
Total	6 titles	13/15	52	41	11	—

=== Other tournaments ===
- EuroBasket
  - 1959 – 17th place
- 2016 FIBA World Olympic Qualifying Tournament – Turin
  - 2016 – 5th place
- FIBA Stanković Continental Champions' Cup
  - 2010 – 4th place
- Islamic Solidarity Games
  - 2005 – 3rd place
- William Jones Cup
  - 2009 – Champions
  - 2010 – Champions
  - 2011 – Champions
  - 2013 – Champions
  - 2015 – Champions

== Honours ==
- FIBA Asia Cup
  - Gold (3): 2007, 2009, 2013
  - Silver (1): 2017
  - Bronze (2): 2015, 2025
- Asian Games
  - (silver) Silver: (2):2014, 2018
  - (bronze) Bronze: (4): 1951, 2006, 2010, 2026
- FIBA Asia Challenge
  - Gold (3): 2012, 2014, 2016

Competition	1st place, gold medalist(s)	2nd place, silver medalist(s)	3rd place, bronze medalist(s)	Total
FIBA Asia Cup	3	1	2	6
Asian Games	0	2	4	6
FIBA Asia Challenge	3	0	0	3
Total	6	3	6	15

Individual Awards

- FIBA Asia Cup MVP
  - Hamed Haddadi – 2007, 2009, 2013, 2017
- FIBA Asia Cup All-Tournament Team
  - Hamed Haddadi – 2009, 2011, 2013, 2017
  - Samad Nikkhah Bahrami – 2009, 2011, 2015
  - Oshin Sahakian – 2013
  - Mohammad Jamshidi – 2017
  - Mohammad Sina Vahedi - 2025
- FIBA Asia Cup Top Scorer
  - Hamed Haddadi – 2013
- FIBA Asia Challenge MVP
  - Hamed Haddadi – 2014, 2016
  - Samad Nikkhah Bahrami – 2012

== Team ==
Roster for the 2027 FIBA Basketball World Cup Qualification.

Iran Men's National Basketball Team – 2027 FIBA Basketball World Cup Qualifications - Group E roster
Players
Coaches

Pos.	No.	Name	Age – Date of birth	Height	Club	Ctr.
PG	5	Mobin Shelkhi	29 – 15 March 1997	1.75 m (5 ft 9 in)	Shahrdari Gorgan BC	(Iran)
F	6	Mohammad Amini	21 – 26 April 2005	2.01 m (6 ft 7 in)	SLUC Nancy Basket	(France)
SG	10	Piter Girgoorian	24 – 27 February 2002	2.01 m (6 ft 7 in)	Shahrdari Gorgan BC	(Iran)
G	11	Mohammad Mahdi Heydari	20 – 28 April 2006	1.96 m (6 ft 5 in)	Esteghlal Tehran	(Iran)
PF	12	Arman Zangeneh	33 – 15 June 1993	2.05 m (6 ft 9 in)	Naft Abadan	(Iran)
PF	13	Mohammad Jamshidi	35 – 30 July 1991	1.98 m (6 ft 6 in)	Mahram Tehran	(Iran)
PF	14	Arsalan Kazemi (C)	36 – 22 April 1990	2.02 m (6 ft 8 in)	Shahrdari Gorgan	(Iran)
F	17	Matin Aghajanpour	24 – 14 March 2001	1.98 m (6 ft 6 in)	Kalleh Mazandaran	(Iran)
C	20	Salar Taheri	20 – 5 February 2006	2.05 m (6 ft 9 in)	Tamis	(Serbia)
C	32	Hassan Aliakbari	30 – 7 July 1996	2.18 m (7 ft 2 in)	Esteghlal Tehran	(Iran)
C	51	Salar Monji	28 – 10 April 1997	2.07 m (6 ft 9 in)	Naft Abadan	(Iran)
PG	55	Seyed Mahdi Jafari	22 – 4 October 2003	1.87 m (6 ft 2 in)	Esteghlal Tehran	(Iran)

Head coach

- (Greece) Sotiris Manolopoulos

Assistant coach(es)

- (Iran) Mohammad Kasaeepour
- (Iran) Farzad Kouhian

Legend

- (C) Team captain
- Club – describes last
  club before the tournament
- Age – describes age
  on 5 August 2025

=== Past rosters ===
Olympic Games

1948 London Ashtari, Ehsasi, Esfandiary, Hashemi, Karandish, Mohtadi, Rafati, Sadeghi, Salabi, Shademan, Soroudi, Soudipour, Zadegan, Coach: Kazem Rambari

2008 Beijing 4 Doraghi, 5 Amini, 6 Davari, 7 Kamrani, 8 Davarpanah, 9 Zandi, 10 Afagh, 11 Sohrabnejad, 12 Sahakian, 13 Nabipour, 14 Bahrami, 15 Haddadi: Coach. Rajko Toroman

2020 Tokyo 4 Vahedi, 5 Jalalpoor, 7 Hassanzadeh, 8 Davarpanah, 13 Jamshidi, 14 Nikkhah Bahrami, 15 Haddadi, 17 Rezaeifar, 20 Rostampour, 23 Geramipoor, 41 Kazemi, 88 Yakhchali, Coach: Mehran Shahintab

FIBA Basketball World Cup

2010 turkey 4 Nabipour, 5 Davoudi, 6 Davari, 7 Kamrani, 8 Veisi, 9 Zandi, 10 Hassanzadeh, 11 Sahakian, 12 Kazemi, 13 Kardoust, 14 Davarpanah, 15 Haddadi, Coach: Veselin Matić

2014 Spain 4 Arghavan, 5 Mashayekhi, 6 Yakhchali, 7 Kamrani, 8 Kazemi, 9 Zangeneh, 10 Afagh, 11 Sahakian, 12 Kardoust, 13 Jamshidi, 14 Bahrami, 15 Haddadi, Coach: Mehmed Bečirovič

2019 China 1 Mozafari, 4 Mirzaei, 5 Mashayekhi, 6 Hosseinzadeh, 7 Hassanzadeh, 8 Yakhchali, 12 Zangeneh, 13 Jamshidi, 14 Bahrami, 15 Haddadi, 20 Rostampour, 23 Geramipoor, Coach: Mehran Shahintab

2023 Philippines, Japan, Indonesia 3 Vahedi, 4 Mirzaei, 5 Mashayekhi, 6 Amini, 7 Rezaeifar, 8 Yakhchali, 10 Girgoorian, 14 Kazemi, 15 Haddadi, 17 Aghajanpour, 30 Agha Miri, 32 Aliakbari, Coach: Hakan Demir

FIBA Asia Cup

2003 China 4 Tajik, 5 Davari, 6 Veisi, 7 Kamrani, 8 S. Bahrami, 9 Zandi, 10 Afagh, 11 Sohrabnejad, 12 Askarnejad, 13 Ahmadian, 14 Rouzbahani, 15 Afradi, Coach: Mostafa Hashemi

2005 Qatar 4 Tajik, 5 A. Bahrami, 6 Amini, 7 Kamrani, 8 S. Bahrami, 9 Zandi, 10 Afagh, 11 Sohrabnejad, 12 Rouzbahani, 13 Shahsavand, 14 Tabeshnia, 15 Haddadi, Coach: Mohammad Mehdi Izadpanah

2007 Japan 4 Doraghi, 5 Amini, 6 Davari, 7 Kamrani, 8 A. Bahrami, 9 Akbari, 10 Afagh, 11 Rouzbahani, 12 Sahakian, 13 Nabipour, 14 S. Bahrami, 15 Haddadi, Coach: Rajko Toroman

2009 China 4 Tajik, 5 Amini, 6 Davari, 7 Kamrani, 8 Davoudi, 9 Akbari, 10 Afagh, 11 Sohrabnejad, 12 Sahakian, 13 Doraghi, 14 Bahrami, 15 Haddadi, Coach: Veselin Matić

2011 China 4 Davarpanah, 5 Davoudi, 6 Davari, 7 Kamrani, 8 Atashi, 9 Kazemi, 10 Afagh, 11 Sahakian, 12 Kardoust, 13 Sohrabnejad, 14 Bahrami, 15 Haddadi, Coach: Veselin Matić

2013 Philippines 4 Jamshidi, 5 Davoudi, 6 Davari, 7 Kamrani, 8 Veisi, 9 Sahakian, 10 Afagh, 11 Sohrabnejad, 12 Kardoust, 13 Arghavan, 14 Bahrami, 15 Haddadi, Coach: Mehmed Bečirovič

2015 China 4 Mashayekhi, 5 Yakhchali, 6 Davari, 7 Kamrani, 8 Davarpanah, 9 Hassanzadeh, 10 Afagh, 11 Sahakian, 12 Kardoust, 13 Jamshidi, 14 Bahrami, 15 Haddadi, Coach: Dirk Bauermann

2017 Lebanon 4 Mirzaei, 5 Mashayekhi, 6 Aslani, 7 Rezaeifar, 8 Yakhchali, 9 Dalirzahan, 10 Niktash, 11 Sahakian, 12 Arghavan, 13 Jamshidi, 14 Kazemi, 15 Haddadi, Coach: Mehran Hatami

2022 Indonesia 1 Mozafari, 5 Mashayekhi, 7 Hassanzadeh, 8 Yakhchali, 10 Yousof Vand, 12 Zangeneh, 13 Jamshidi, 14 Kazemi, 15 Haddadi, 17 Rezaeifar, 23 Pazrofteh, 71 Aghajanpour, Coach: Saeed Armaghani

2025 Saudi Arabia 3 Vahedi, 5 Sheikhi, 6 Amini, 7 Rezaeifar, 11 Heydari, 12 Zangeneh, 14 Kazemi, 17 Aghajanpour, 23 Rahimi, 32 Aliakbari, 51 Monji, 55 Jafari, Coach: Sotiris Manolopoulos

FIBA EuroBasket

1959 Turkey 3 Salabi, 4 Kamali, 5 Meshun, 6 Agakuzik, 7 Ufervizi, 9 Taçbehs, 10 Avendi, 11 Veisi, 12 Vafai, 13 Rezi, Coach: Hassan Nikli

Asian Games

1951 New Delhi Khaleghpour, Mashhoun, Masoumi, Mokhberi, Oshar, Razi, Safiyar, Salabi, Soroudi, Soudipour, Coach: –

2006 Doha 4 Tajik, 5 Amini, 6 Veisi, 7 Kamrani, 8 S. Bahrami, 9 Zandi, 10 Afagh, 11 Honardoust, 12 A. Bahrami, 13 Ahmadian, 14 Nabipour, 15 Haddadi, Coach: Fred Oniga

2010 Guangzhou 4 Amini, 5 Davoudi, 6 Davari, 7 Kamrani, 8 Davarpanah, 9 Sahakian, 10 Afagh, 11 Sohrabnejad, 12 Jamshidi, 13 Kardoust, 14 Bahrami, 15 Doraghi, Coach: Veselin Matić

2014 Incheon 4 Arghavan, 5 Mashayekhi, 6 Yakhchali, 7 Kamrani, 8 Zangeneh, 9 Aslani, 10 Afagh, 11 Sahakian, 12 Kardoust, 13 Jamshidi, 14 Bahrami, 15 Haddadi, Coach: Mehmed Bečirovič

2018 Jakarta 4 Mirzaei, 5 Mashayekhi, 7 Davoudi, 8 Yakhchali, 10 Dalirzahan, 12 Arghavan, 13 Jamshidi, 14 Bahrami, 15 Haddadi, 17 Rezaeifar, 41 Kazemi, 77 Hassanzadeh, Coach: Mehran Hatami

2022 Hangzhou 1 Shahrian, 3 Vahedi, 4 Mirzaei, 5 Mashayekhi, 7 Rezaeifar, 10 Girgoorian, 11 Gholizadeh, 14 Kazemi, 17 Aghajanpour, 21 Torabi, 23 Pazirofteh, 32 Aliakbari, Coach: Hakan Demir

== Head coaches ==
Note: The following list may not be complete

- (Iran) Kazem Rahbari (1948)
- (Iran) Hassan Nikli (1959)
- (Iran) Hossein Soudipour (1966)
- (Romania) George Chiraleu (1974)
- (Iran) Mohammad Hassan Zolfaghari (1981)
- (Iran) Enayatollah Atashi (1983)
- (Iran) Reza Esmaeili (1985)
- (Iran) Majid Towfigh (1989)
- (Iran) Asadollah Kabir (1990)
- (Soviet Union) Valery Lunichkin (1991)
- (Iran) Asadollah Kabir (1993)
- (Armenia) Vitaly Zastukhov (1994)
- (Iran) Manouchehr Shahamatnejad (1995)
- (Iran) Ahmad Reza Elliin (1996)
- (Iran) Saeid Fathi (1997)
- (Iran) Enayatollah Atashi (1998)
- (United States) Gary LeMoine (2000–2001)
- (Iran) Saeid Armaghani (2001–2002)
- (Iran) Mehran Shahintab (2002)
- (Serbia and Montenegro) Nenad Trajković (2003)
- (Iran) Mostafa Hashemi (2003)
- (Serbia and Montenegro) Vladimir Bošnjak (2004–2005)
- (Iran) Mohammad Mehdi Izadpanah (2005)
- (Nigeria) Fred Oniga (2006)
- (Serbia) Rajko Toroman (2007–2008)
- (Serbia) Veselin Matić (2009–2011)
- (Slovenia) Memi Bečirovič (2012–2014)
- (Germany) Dirk Bauermann (2015–2017)
- (Iran) Mehran Hatami (2017)
- (Iran) Mehran Shahintab (2018–2021)
- (Iran) Mostafa Hashemi (2021–2022)
- (Iran) Saeed Armaghani (2022–2023)
- (Turkey) Hakan Demir (2023–2024)
- (Greece) Sotiris Manolopoulos (2024–present)

== Notable players ==
=== Hamed Haddadi ===
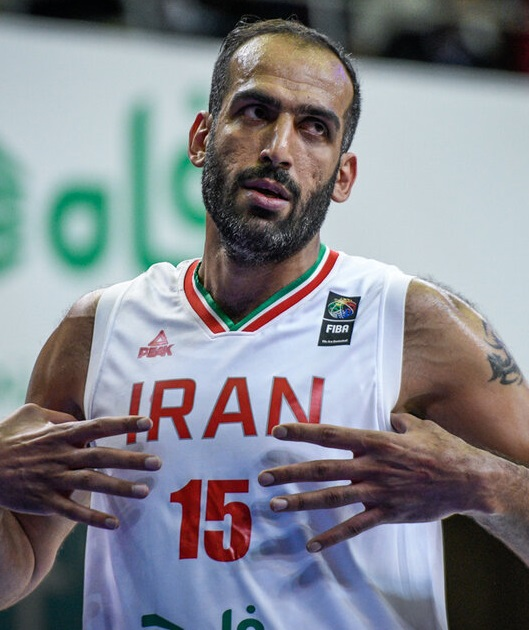
Hamed Haddadi in 2020

Center Hamed Haddadi was the first Iranian to play in the NBA. Although he went undrafted in 2004, Haddadi signed with the Memphis Grizzlies in 2008. He appeared in more than 150 games for the Grizzlies and the Phoenix Suns.

On the international stage, Haddadi won medals at the FIBA Asia Cup, the Asian Games, and the FIBA Asia Challenge. At the FIBA Asia Cup, he won five medals, including three golds. Haddadi is one of only three players to win the FIBA Asia Cup MVP award since 2007, taking home four of the seven MVP trophies during that run.

At age 38, Haddadi made his final World Cup appearance at FIBA Basketball World Cup 2023. He was named to the Iranian squad in 2010, 2014, and 2019, and was named to Iran's extended roster for 2023.

The Iran Basketball Federation retired Hamed Haddadi's number 15 jersey on 21 February 2025, ahead of an Asia Cup qualifying game against India. It was the first jersey number retirement in Iran for any sport.

=== Others ===
- Samad Nikkhah Bahrami – Former LNB Élite Player, 3× FIBA Asia Cup All-Star Selection
- Mahdi Kamrani – Former CBA Player, Key Member For Iran
- Arsalan Kazemi – Former CBA Player, 54th Overall Pick in the 2013 NBA Draft
- Behnam Yakhchali – Current Bundesliga Player For The Gladiators Treves
- Mohammad Amini – Current LNB Élite Player For The SLUC Nancy Basket, Participated in the 2026 NBA Summer League for the Boston Celtics

== Kit supplier ==
=== Manufacturer ===
2008–2009: Merooj

2010–present: Peak

== See also ==
- Iran men's national under-19 basketball team
- Iran men's national under-16 basketball team
- Iran men's national 3x3 team
- Iran women's national basketball team
- Iran women's national under-16 basketball team
- Iran women's national 3x3 team
- Iranian Basketball Super League
