= Fabricio Oberto =

Argentine-Italian basketball player

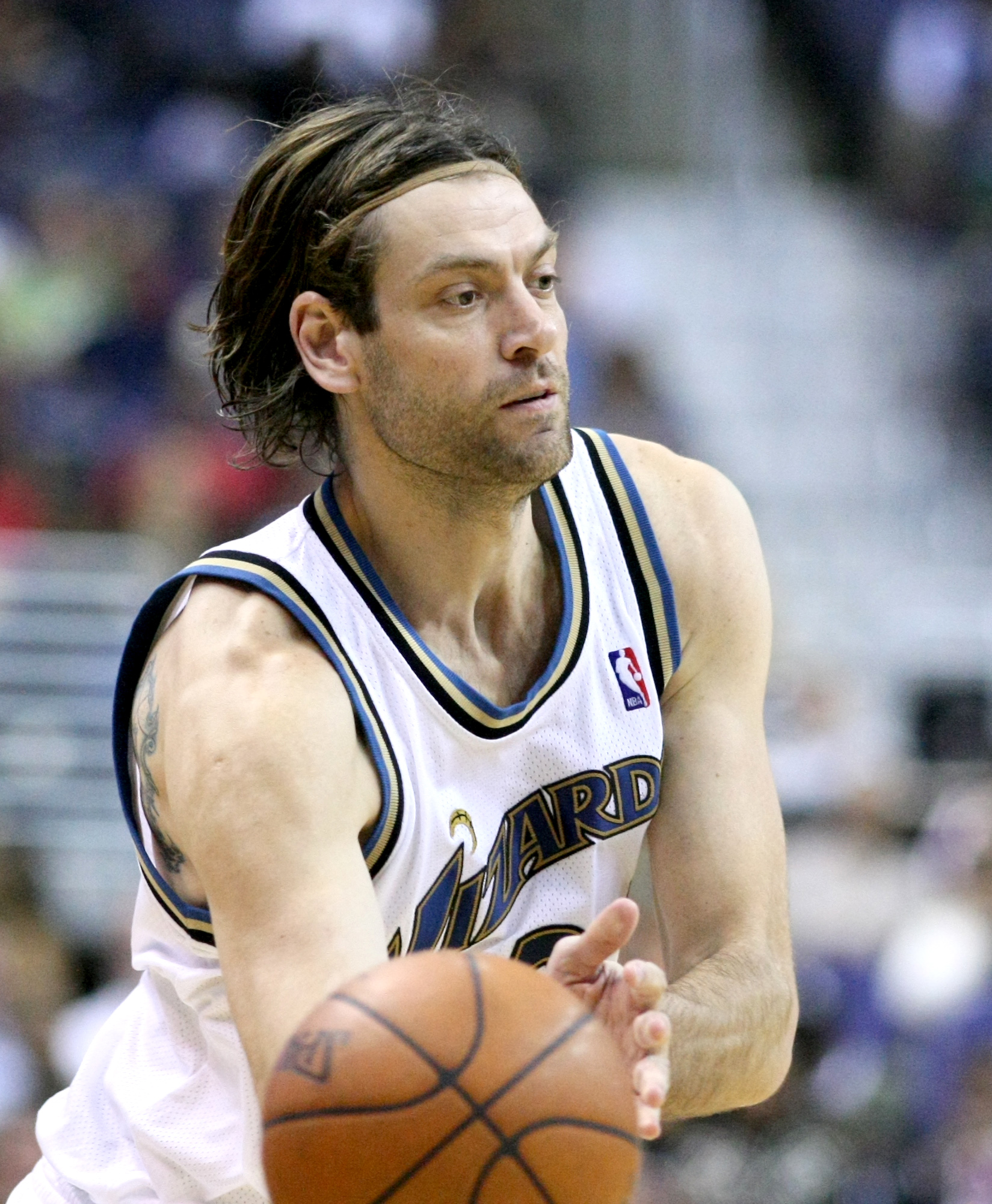
- Oberto with the Washington Wizards in 2009

Personal information
- Born: March 21, 1975 (age 51) Las Varillas, Argentina
- Listed height: 6 ft 10 in (2.08 m)
- Listed weight: 256 lb (116 kg)

Career information
- NBA draft: 1997: undrafted
- Playing career: 1993–2013
- Position: Center / power forward
- Number: 7, 21

Career history
- 1993–1998: Atenas
- 1998–1999: Olympiacos
- 2000–2002: Tau Cerámica
- 2002–2005: Pamesa Valencia
- 2005–2009: San Antonio Spurs
- 2009–2010: Washington Wizards
- 2010: Portland Trail Blazers
- 2013: Atenas

Career highlights
- NBA champion (2007); ULEB Cup champion (2003); Liga ACB champion (2002); Liga ACB All-Star (2003); FIBA South American League MVP (1998); LNB MVP (1998); LNB Finals MVP (1998); LNB Slam Dunk Contest champion (1995); 4x Argentina League All Star (es) (1995, 1996, 1997, 1998)

Career NBA statistics
- Points: 1,081 (3.2 ppg)
- Rebounds: 1,175 (3.5 rpg)
- Assists: 300 (0.9 apg)
- Stats at NBA.com
- Stats at Basketball Reference
- FIBA Hall of Fame
Medals
Men's basketball
Representing Argentina
Summer Olympic Games
| Gold medal – first place | 2004 Athens |
| Bronze medal – third place | 2008 Beijing |
FIBA World Cup
| Silver medal – second place | 2002 Indianapolis |
FIBA AmeriCup
| Silver medal – second place | 1995 Neuquen |
| Gold medal – first place | 2001 Neuquen |
| Silver medal – second place | 2003 San Juan |
| Gold medal – first place | 2011 Mar del Plata |
FIBA South American Championship
| Bronze medal – third place | 1997 Maracaibo |
FIBA Diamond Ball
| Bronze medal – third place | 2004 Belgrade |
| Gold medal – first place | 2008 Nanjing |
Pan American Games
| Gold medal – first place | 1995 Mar del Plata |

Fabricio Raúl Jesús Oberto (Latin American Spanish: [faˈβɾisjo oˈβeɾto]; born March 21, 1975) is an Argentine-Italian color analyst and former professional basketball player. At 6 ft 10 in (2.08 m), he played as a center and power forward. With the LNB club Atenas, in his native Argentina, Oberto began playing professionally in 1993, and later played overseas with teams in Spain and Greece. In 2005, Oberto signed with the San Antonio Spurs, a team of the American National Basketball Association (NBA), and won a championship with the Spurs in 2007. He is also a former member of the senior Argentina national basketball team, with whom he won two Olympic medals, including a gold medal in 2004.

He was inducted into the FIBA Hall of Fame in 2019.

== Professional career ==
=== Argentina and Europe ===
At age 17, Oberto went to a trial at Atenas de Córdoba, one of the most important basketball clubs in Argentina, and was selected to start the following year, and started playing professionally later that year. In 1998, after being chosen MVP of the finals of the Argentine league, he transferred to the Greek League club Olympiacos, starting his EuroLeague experience that would take him to the Spanish League's Tau Cerámica a year later. After 3 seasons with TAU, he moved to Pamesa Valencia in 2002.

He was selected to play in 4 Argentine All-Star Games (1995–1998), winning the slam dunk contest in 1995.

=== NBA career ===
In 2005, after voiding his contract with Pamesa, Oberto signed a three-year, US$7.5 million contract with the San Antonio Spurs of the NBA, where he joined fellow Argentine Manu Ginóbili. He kept with jersey number 7, the same kit number he used with the Argentina national basketball team. Oberto was the oldest rookie in Spurs history at the age of 31.

During his first year in the NBA, Oberto usually averaged fewer than nine minutes per game. Still, he was satisfied with his role on the Spurs as a perennial championship contender.

In his second NBA season, Oberto became more of a factor in the Spurs rotation, starting in some games and getting his first double-double on November 8, 2006, when he scored 22 points and pulled down 10 rebounds. He also became a pivotal player for the Spurs during the 2006–07 Western Conference Finals, averaging 31 minutes and 14 points in the first two games of the series. Oberto won an NBA championship with the Spurs in 2007.

On June 23, 2009, Oberto was traded to the Detroit Pistons as a part of a three-team trade among Pistons, Spurs and the Milwaukee Bucks, which included Richard Jefferson. Then he was immediately waived by the Pistons.

On August 11, 2009, he was signed by the Wizards. Since jersey number 7 was already taken by Andray Blatche, he chose to wear number 21 because of his birth date (March 21) and in honor of one of his idols, former teammate Tim Duncan. After a single season in which he got limited playing time as the team struggled through the Gilbert Arenas gun incident and ultimately began to rebuild, he became a free agent once more in the summer of 2010.

Oberto was a significant contributor defending Argentina for its fifth-place finish at the 2010 FIBA World Championship. After his solid play during the World Championship in Turkey, he received multiple offers from European teams, most notably Efes Pilsen and Real Madrid. Oberto held out for an opportunity to sign with an NBA team. He reached an agreement to join the Portland Trail Blazers for the 2010–11 season. However, on November 4, 2010, after playing five games for Portland, he began experiencing palpitations related to a previous heart condition and decided to retire in order to preserve his health.

=== Return to activity ===
In January 2013, Oberto signed a contract with his former team, Atenas de Córdoba, returning to the Liga Nacional de Básquetbol after 14 years. Oberto was hired for the remainder of the season as a replacement for center Julián Aprea, who had been separated from the team by coach Alejandro Lotterio and then dismissed at the end of 2012.

== National team career ==
Oberto started playing with the Argentina national basketball team shortly before his 20th birthday in 1995; tournament success followed, including bringing to Argentina a gold medal at the 2004 Summer Olympics. He additionally won a bronze medal with the team in the 2008 tournament.

In July 2011, Oberto announced that he was coming out of retirement to play in the FIBA Americas Championship. He said that doctors had cleared him to participate. Personal problems prevented him from playing for Argentina in the 2012 Summer Olympics.

== Accomplishments and awards ==
=== Clubs ===
- Argentine Youth League Champion: 1993
- South American Club Championship champion: 1994
- Pan American Club Championship champion: 1996
- FIBA South American League champion: 1997, 1998
- Argentine League champion: 1998
- Spanish King's Cup winner: 2002
- Spanish League champion: 2002
- ULEB Cup champion: 2003
- NBA champion: 2007

=== Argentina national team ===
- Summer Olympics Gold: 2004
- Summer Olympics Bronze: 2008
- Pan American Games Gold: 1995
- FIBA World Championship Silver: 2002
- FIBA Americas Championship Gold: 2001, 2011
- FIBA Americas Championship Silver: 1995, 2003
- FIBA South American Championship Bronze: 1997
- FIBA Diamond Ball Gold: 2008
- FIBA Diamond Ball Bronze: 2004

== Post-playing career ==
On February 9, 2021, the Austin Spurs of the NBA G League announced that Oberto would be the team's color analyst during the 2020–21 season.

== Personal life ==
Oberto was born in Las Varillas, Argentina. Oberto and his wife have a daughter. He also enjoys playing the guitar and his favorite bands include Pearl Jam, Nirvana, Foo Fighters, U2 and Metallica.

On June 4, 2009, Oberto underwent a successful ablation procedure to correct the electrical system of the heart that was sending Oberto into atrial fibrillation. The procedure was performed at the Texas Cardiac Arrhythmia Institute in Austin.

== NBA career statistics ==
Legend
| GP | Games played | GS | Games started | MPG | Minutes per game |
| FG% | Field goal percentage | 3P% | 3-point field goal percentage | FT% | Free throw percentage |
| RPG | Rebounds per game | APG | Assists per game | SPG | Steals per game |
| BPG | Blocks per game | PPG | Points per game | **Bold** | Career high |
| † | Won an NBA championship | * | Led the league |

=== Regular season ===
| Year | Team | GP | GS | MPG | FG% | 3P% | FT% | RPG | APG | SPG | BPG | PPG |
|---|---|---|---|---|---|---|---|---|---|---|---|---|
| 2005–06 | San Antonio | 59 | 0 | 8.3 | .473 | .000 | .556 | 2.1 | .5 | .2 | .2 | 1.7 |
| 2006–07† | San Antonio | 79 | 33 | 17.3 | .562 | — | .647 | 4.7 | .9 | .3 | **.3** | 4.4 |
| 2007–08 | San Antonio | **82*** | **64** | **20.1** | .608 | .000 | .607 | **5.2** | **1.2** | **.5** | .2 | **4.8** |
| 2008–09 | San Antonio | 54 | 11 | 12.5 | .587 | .000 | .571 | 2.6 | 1.1 | .1 | .2 | 2.6 |
| 2009–10 | Washington | 57 | 20 | 11.4 | **.625** | — | **.765** | 1.8 | .9 | .2 | .2 | 1.5 |
| 2010–11 | Portland | 5 | 0 | 9.0 | .600 | — | .500 | 1.4 | .0 | .0 | .0 | 1.4 |
| Career | | 336 | 128 | 14.5 | .576 | .000 | .617 | 3.5 | .9 | .3 | .2 | 3.2 |

=== Playoffs ===
| Year | Team | GP | GS | MPG | FG% | 3P% | FT% | RPG | APG | SPG | BPG | PPG |
|---|---|---|---|---|---|---|---|---|---|---|---|---|
| 2006 | San Antonio | 7 | 0 | 4.9 | .333 | — | .250 | .9 | .1 | .1 | **.4** | 1.0 |
| 2007† | San Antonio | **20** | **12** | **20.8** | .625 | .000 | .571 | **4.9** | .7 | .3 | .2 | 5.6 |
| 2008 | San Antonio | 17 | 9 | 19.5 | .609 | — | .700 | 4.2 | **1.2** | .4 | .3 | 3.7 |
| 2009 | San Antonio | 2 | 0 | 11.0 | **.667** | — | **1.000** | 2.0 | .0 | **1.0** | .0 | **6.0** |
| Career | | 46 | 21 | 17.4 | .603 | .000 | .615 | 3.9 | .8 | .3 | .3 | 4.2 |
