= 2008 FIBA Diamond Ball =

Tournament details
- Arena: Nanjing, China
- Dates: July 29 – August 1

Final positions
- Champions: Argentina (1st title)
- Runners-up: Australia
- Third place: China
- Fourth place: Iran

Awards and statistics
- Top scorer(s): (Argentina) Luis Scola (20.0 points per game)

The 2008 FIBA Diamond Ball was an official basketball tournament held in Nanjing, China, from July 29 until August 1, 2008. The FIBA Diamond Ball was an official international basketball tournament organised by FIBA, held every Olympic year prior to the Olympics. It was the 3rd edition of the FIBA Diamond Ball. The six participating teams were Angola, Argentina, Australia, host China, Iran and Serbia.

== Participating teams ==
Group A	Group B
Angola; Australia; China	Argentina; Iran; Serbia

- Angola – African champions
- Argentina – Olympic champions & Americas runners-up (USA were Americas champions)
- Australia – Oceania champions
- China – Olympics hosts
- Iran – Asian champions
- Serbia – 2004 FIBA Diamond Ball winners (as Serbia and Montenegro; Spain were World champions; Russia was European champions)

== Preliminary round ==
Qualified for the finals

=== Group A ===
*All times are China Standard Time (UTC+8).

Team	Pld	W	L	PF	PA	PD	Pts
Australia	2	2	0	148	133	+15	4
China	2	1	1	138	141	−3	3
Angola	2	0	2	152	164	−12	2

July 29
19:30

Boxscore

China	83–74	Angola
Scoring by quarter: 20–22, 20–15, 22–15, 21–22

Nanjing, China

July 30
16:00

Boxscore

Australia	67–55	China
Scoring by quarter: 20–16, 18–12, 17–17, 12–10

Nanjing, China

July 31
16:00

Boxscore

Angola	78–81	Australia
Scoring by quarter: 16–17, 19–25, 24–17, 19–22

Nanjing, China

=== Group B ===
*All times are China Standard Time (UTC+8).

Qualified for the finals

Team	Pld	W	L	PF	PA	PD	Pts
Argentina	2	2	0	156	131	+25	4
Iran	2	1	1	143	151	−8	3
Serbia	2	0	2	130	147	−17	2

July 29
16:00

Boxscore

Argentina	81–71	Iran
Scoring by quarter: 24–24, 18–11, 20–17, 19–19

Nanjing, China

July 30
19:00

Boxscore

Iran	72–70	Serbia
Scoring by quarter: 18–19, 17–16, 19–17, 18–18

Nanjing, China

July 31
19:00

Boxscore

Serbia	60–75	Argentina
Scoring by quarter: 18–21, 16–14, 9–20, 17–20

Nanjing, China

== Final round ==
*All times are China Standard Time (UTC+8).

=== 5th place ===
August 1
14:00

Boxscore

Angola	62–99	Serbia
Scoring by quarter: 14–24, 19–21, 20–22, 19–32

Nanjing, China

=== Third place ===
August 1
16:00

Boxscore

China	75–46	Iran
Scoring by quarter: 19–11, 18–10, 16–6, 22–19

Nanjing, China

=== Final ===
August 1
19:30

Boxscore

Australia	91–95	Argentina
Scoring by quarter: 25–24, 22–11, 22–27, 22–33

Nanjing, China

== Final standings ==
The final standings per FIBA official website:

Pos	Team	Pld	W	L	PF	PA	PD	Pts
1st place, gold medalist(s)	Argentina	3	3	0	251	222	+29	6
2nd place, silver medalist(s)	Australia	3	2	1	239	228	+11	5
3rd place, bronze medalist(s)	China	3	2	1	213	187	+26	5
4	Iran	3	1	2	189	226	−37	4
5	Serbia	3	1	2	229	209	+20	4
6	Angola	3	0	3	214	263	−49	3

Source: FIBA

2008 FIBA Diamond Ball winners

Argentina
First title

== See also ==
- Acropolis Tournament
- Basketball at the Summer Olympics
- FIBA Basketball World Cup
- FIBA Asia Cup
- Adecco Cup
- Marchand Continental Championship Cup
- Belgrade Trophy
- Stanković Cup
- William Jones Cup
