= Dejan Koturović =

Serbian basketball player

Personal information
- Born: 31 March 1972 (age 54) Belgrade, SR Serbia, SFR Yugoslavia
- Listed height: 2.10 m (6 ft 11 in)
- Listed weight: 120 kg (265 lb)

Career information
- NBA draft: 1994: undrafted
- Playing career: 1989–2004
- Position: Center

Career history
- 1989–1995: Spartak Subotica
- 1995–1997: Partizan
- 1997–1998: PSG Racing
- 1998–2000: Ülkerspor
- 2000–2002: Alba Berlin
- 2002–2003: Virtus Bologna
- 2003–2004: Baskonia

Career highlights
- 2× YUBA League champion (1996, 1997); 2× Bundesliga champion (2001, 2002); German Cup winner (2002)
Medals
Representing FR Yugoslavia
Men's basketball
FIBA World Championship
Gold medal – first place	2002 United States	National team
FIBA European Championship
Gold medal – first place	1995 Greece	National team

Dejan Koturović (Serbian Cyrillic: Дејан Котуровић; born 31 March 1972) is a retired Serbian professional basketball player.

== Playing career ==
=== Europe ===
During his professional career, Koturović played for Spartak Subotica, Partizan, PSG Racing, Ülkerspor, Alba Berlin, Virtus Bologna and Tau Cerámica.

=== NBA ===
After winning gold at the 2002 FIBA World Championship, Koturović received interest from the Boston Celtics but they ended up signing Rubén Wolkowyski instead. Koturović then turned down an offer from the Toronto Raptors and signed for Virtus Bologna.

On 8 October 2003, Koturović signed a free-agent contract with the Phoenix Suns. He was planned as a temporary replacement for the injured Scott Williams. Koturović was waived on 24 October 2003 after Williams started healing faster than expected.

== National team career ==
Koturović played for the national team of FR Yugoslavia/Serbia and Montenegro in three major tournaments: winning the gold medal at the 1995 FIBA European Championship and the 2002 FIBA World Championship and also featuring at the 2003 FIBA European Championship.

=== 1995 EuroBasket ===
As a young player on a team coached by Dušan Ivković, twenty-three-year-old Koturović had limited playing time at the 1995 FIBA European Championship where Yugoslavia went on to win gold.

=== 2002 World Championship ===
Koturović did not feature in any major international tournaments for seven years until the 2002 FIBA World Championship. Under coach Svetislav Pešić, Koturović featured in the starting lineup, shining in the semifinals against New Zealand where he led the team in scoring with 18 points. Yugoslavia went on to beat Argentina in the final with Koturović averaging 12.8 points, 7.1 rebounds and 1.1 blocks in the tournament.

=== 2003 EuroBasket ===
One year after winning the World Championship in Indianapolis, Koturović again answered the national team call-up, this time under the new Serbia and Montenegro banner at the 2003 FIBA European Championship in Sweden.

In mid August 2003, during the national team training camp weeks before the tournament's start, following an exhibition game against Greece, coach Duško Vujošević expelled Koturović from the team—reportedly for showing insubordination during the Greece game—and called up Đuro Ostojić as replacement. The action resulted in a public row between Koturović and Vujošević.

The two soon made up publicly with Koturović being reinstated in the team and eventually even making the final 12-man roster Vujošević took to the tournament. After losing to Russia, then beating outsiders Sweden, and losing to Spain in its 4-team preliminary round robin group, Serbia and Montenegro barely beat Turkey to make the quarterfinals where they lost to Lithuania. The team eventually placed sixth in the tournament, a result seen as disappointing in the country after two straight major tournament wins—EuroBasket 2001 and 2002 FIBA World Championship. The mending of fences between Vujošević and Koturović would prove only nominal as, right after the tournament ended, Koturović publicly blasted Vujošević for the team's disappointing result.

== Personal life ==
Koturović holds an Italian passport. In recent years, he has been a shamanic practitioner.
