= 2002 FIBA World Championship final =

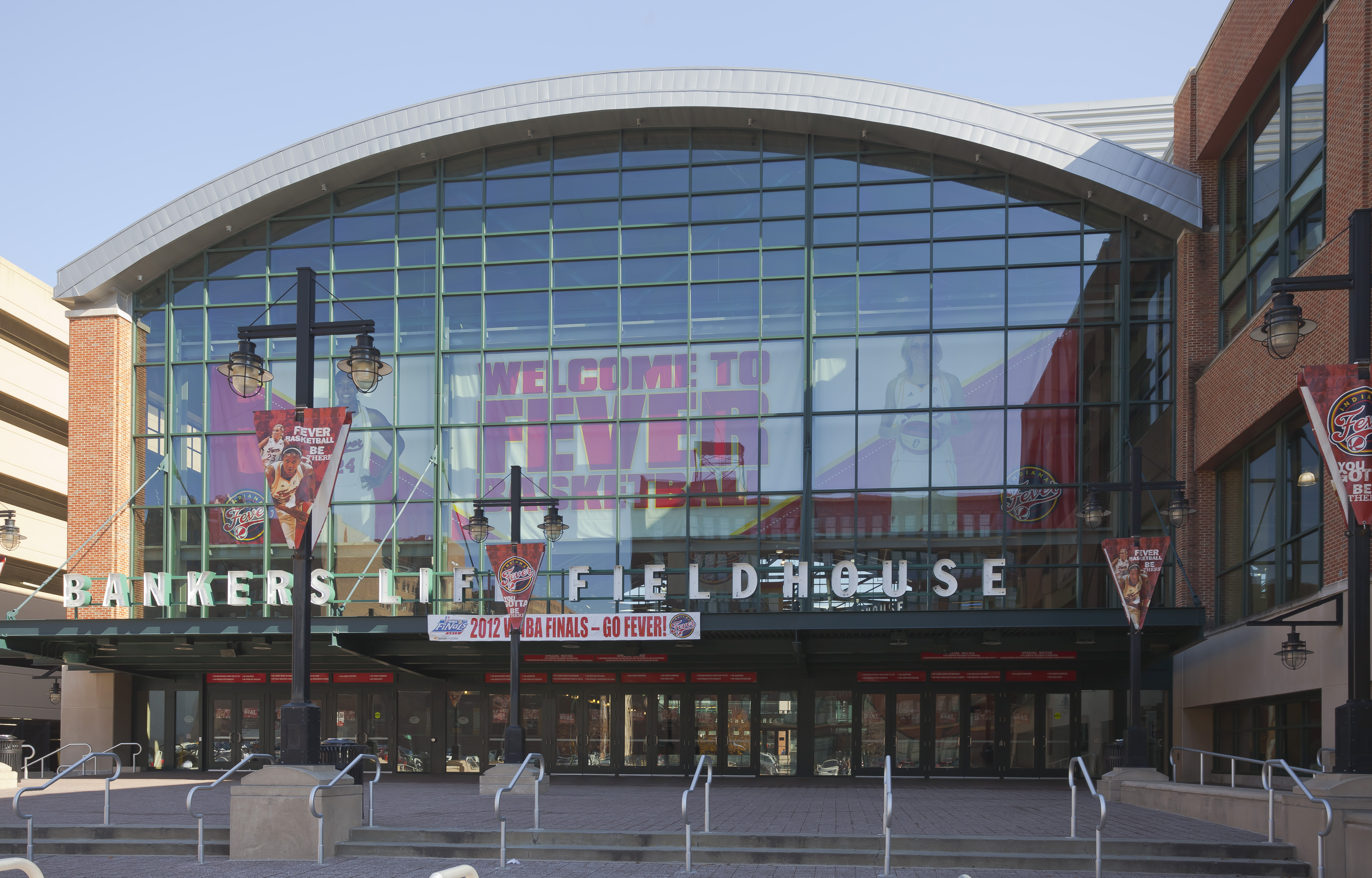
- The Conseco Fieldhouse in Indianapolis hosted the final
- Event: 2002 FIBA World Championship
FR Yugoslavia	Argentina
(Federal Republic of Yugoslavia)	(Argentina)
84	77
- (after overtime)
- Date: 8 September 2002
- Venue: Conseco Fieldhouse, Indianapolis, United States
- Referees: Nikolaos Pitsilkas (Greece); Reynaldo Mercedes (Dominican Republic)
- Attendance: 17,079

The 2002 FIBA World Championship final was the concluding basketball game which determined the winner of the 2002 FIBA World Championship. The game was played on 8 September 2002 in the Conseco Fieldhouse in Indianapolis, Indiana, U.S.

== Route to the finals ==
Note: In all results below, the score of the finalist is given first.

Yugoslavia		Round	Argentina	
Opponent	Result	Season	Opponent	Result
2nd in Group A (2–1)		Group phase	1st in Group D (3–0)	
3rd in Group E (4–2)		Second round	1st in Group F (6–0)	
Opponent	Result	Knockout phase	Opponent	Result
United States	81–78	Quarter-finals	Brazil	78–67
New Zealand	89–78	Semi-finals	Germany	86–80

== Match details ==
8 September 2002	FR Yugoslavia	84–77(OT)	Argentina	Conseco Fieldhouse, Indianapolis
15:00	Scoring by quarter: 24–19, 17–20, 11–18, 23–18, Overtime: 9–2
	Pts: Bodiroga 27; Rebs: Koturović 9 Asts: Bodiroga 3	Boxscore	Pts: Oberto 28; Rebs: Oberto 10; Asts: Sánchez 6	Attendance: 17,079; Referees: Nikolaos Pitsilkas (GRE), Reynaldo Mercedes (DOM)

Starters:			Pts	Reb	Ast
PG	13	Miloš Vujanić	7	0	0
SG	15	Milan Gurović	3	3	1
SF	8	Peja Stojaković	26	6	0
PF	5	Dejan Koturović	3	9	1
C	12	Vlade Divac	3	8	1
Reserves:					
SF	4	Dejan Bodiroga	27	6	3
SG	7	Igor Rakočević	0	1	2
PG	10	Marko Jarić	9	3	2
C	14	Dejan Tomašević	6	2	1
PF	6	Žarko Čabarkapa	DNP		
SG	9	Aleksandar Smiljanić	DNP		
C	11	Predrag Drobnjak	DNP		
Head coach:
(FR Yugoslavia) Svetislav Pešić

Yugoslavia	Argentina

Yugoslavia	Statistics	Argentina
19/39 (48.7%)	2-pt field goals	24/46 (52.2%)
6/27 (22.2%)	3-pt field goals	5/22 (22.7%)
28/40 (70%)	Free throws	14/23 (60.9%)
11	Offensive rebounds	8
27	Defensive rebounds	28
38	Total rebounds	36
11	Assists	17
9	Turnovers	8
9	Steals	5
4	Blocks	2
26	Fouls	29

Starters:			Pts	Reb	Ast
PG	4	Pepe Sánchez	3	6	6
SG	10	Hugo Sconochini	3	4	2
SF	13	Andrés Nocioni	5	1	10
PF	7	Fabricio Oberto	28	10	1
C	15	Rubén Wolkowyski	11	6	2
Reserves:					
SG	5	Manu Ginóbili	0	1	0
PG	6	Alejandro Montecchia	4	2	1
PG	8	Lucas Victoriano	0	0	0
C	9	Gabriel Fernández	2	0	0
PF	11	Luis Scola	11	4	2
SF	14	Leandro Palladino	10	2	2
PF	12	Leonardo Gutiérrez	DNP		
Head coach:
(Argentine Basketball Confederation) Rubén Magnano
