= 2000 FIBA Diamond Ball =

1st edition of the FIBA Diamond Ball Tournament held in Hong Kong, China

Tournament details
- Arena: Hong Kong, China
- Dates: September 2 – September 6

Final positions
- Champions: Australia (1st title)
- Runners-up: (Federal Republic of Yugoslavia) FR Yugoslavia
- Third place: Italy
- Fourth place: Canada

Awards and statistics
- Top scorer(s): (Canada) Steve Nash (22.0 points per game)

The 2000 FIBA Diamond Ball was a basketball tournament held in Hong Kong, China, from September 2 until September 6, 2000. The FIBA Diamond Ball was an official international basketball tournament organised by FIBA, held every Olympic year prior to the Olympics. It was the 1st edition of the FIBA Diamond Ball. The six participating teams were Angola, Argentina, Australia, host China, Canada and FR Yugoslavia.

== Participating teams ==
Group A	Group B
Canada; China (Federal Republic of Yugoslavia) FR Yugoslavia	Australia; Angola; Italy

- Angola – African champions
- Australia – Olympics hosts (New Zealand were Oceania champions)
- Canada – Americas runners-up (USA were Olympic & Americas champions)
- China – Asian champions
- Italy – European champions
- (Federal Republic of Yugoslavia) FR Yugoslavia – World champions

== Preliminary round ==
Qualified for the finals

=== Group A ===
*All times are China Standard Time (UTC+8).

Team	Pld	W	L	PF	PA	PD	Pts
(Federal Republic of Yugoslavia) FR Yugoslavia	2	2	0	178	153	+25	4
Canada	2	1	1	175	167	+8	3
China	2	0	2	137	170	−33	2

September 2
15:00

Boxscore

China	64–84	(Federal Republic of Yugoslavia) FR Yugoslavia
Scoring by half: 35-52, 29-32

Hong Kong, China

September 3
15:00

Boxscore

Canada	86–73	China
Scoring by half: 33-38, 53-35

Hong Kong, China

September 4
18:30

Boxscore

FR Yugoslavia (Federal Republic of Yugoslavia)	94–89	Canada
Scoring by half: 50-50, 44-39

Hong Kong, China

=== Group B ===
*All times are China Standard Time (UTC+8).

Qualified for the finals

Team	Pld	W	L	PF	PA	PD	Pts
Australia	2	2	0	196	135	+61	4
Italy	2	1	1	159	162	−3	3
Angola	2	0	2	114	172	−58	2

September 2
17:00

Boxscore

Angola	61–77	Italy
Scoring by half: 43-41, 18-36

Hong Kong, China

September 3
17:00

Boxscore

Australia	95–53	Angola
Scoring by half: 46-34, 49-19

Hong Kong, China

September 4
20:30

Boxscore

Italy	82–101	Australia
Scoring by half: 43-56, 39-45

Hong Kong, China

== Final round ==
*All times are China Standard Time (UTC+8).

=== 5th place ===
September 6
17:00

Boxscore

China	69–61	Angola
Scoring by half: 30-29, 39-32

Hong Kong, China

=== Third place ===
September 6
19:00

Boxscore

Canada	74–82	Italy
Scoring by half: 42-45, 32-37

Hong Kong, China

=== Final ===
September 6
21:00

Boxscore

FR Yugoslavia (Federal Republic of Yugoslavia)	71–78	Australia
Scoring by half: 44-37, 27-41

Hong Kong, China

== Final standings ==
The final standings per FIBA official website:

Pos	Team	Pld	W	L	PF	PA	PD	Pts
1st place, gold medalist(s)	Australia	3	3	0	274	206	+68	6
2nd place, silver medalist(s)	(Federal Republic of Yugoslavia) FR Yugoslavia	3	2	1	249	231	+18	5
3rd place, bronze medalist(s)	Italy	3	2	1	241	236	+5	5
4	Canada	3	1	2	249	249	0	4
5	China	3	1	2	206	231	−25	4
6	Angola	3	0	3	175	241	−66	3

Source: FIBA

2000 FIBA Diamond Ball winners

Australia
First title

== See also ==
- Acropolis Tournament
- Basketball at the Summer Olympics
- FIBA Basketball World Cup
- FIBA Asia Cup
- Adecco Cup
- Marchand Continental Championship Cup
- Belgrade Trophy
- Stanković Cup
- William Jones Cup
