= 2008 FIBA Diamond Ball for Women =

2008 FIBA Diamond Ball
Tournament details
- Arena: Haining, China
- Dates: August 2 – August 5

Final positions
- Champions: United States (1st title)
- Runners-up: Australia
- Third place: China
- Fourth place: Latvia

Awards and statistics
- Top scorer(s): (Latvia) Anete Jēkabsone-Žogota (22.3 points per game)

The 2008 FIBA Diamond Ball was a basketball tournament held in Nanjing, China, from August 2 until August 5, 2008. The FIBA Diamond Ball was an official international basketball tournament organised by FIBA, held every Olympic year prior to the Olympics. It was the 2nd edition of the FIBA Diamond Ball. The six participating teams were Australia, host China, Latvia, Mali, Russia and United States.

== Participating teams ==
Group A	Group B
Australia; China; Mali	Latvia; Russia; United States

- Mali – African champions
- United States – Olympic & Americas champions
- Australia – 2004 FIBA Diamond Ball winners (also Oceania & World champions)
- China – Olympics hosts
- Japan – Asia Cup 3rd place (South Korea were Asia Cup champions) → replaced by Latvia
- Russia – European champions

== Preliminary round ==
Qualified for the finals

=== Group A ===
*All times are China Standard Time (UTC+8).

Team	Pld	W	L	PF	PA	PD	Pts
Australia	2	2	0	196	113	+83	4
China	2	1	1	161	151	+10	3
Mali	2	0	2	110	203	−93	2

August 2
19:30

Boxscore

Mali	67–91	China
Scoring by quarter: 18–20, 14–15, 18–26, 17–30

Haining, China

August 3
15:30

Boxscore

China	70–84	Australia
Scoring by quarter: 16–23, 17–26, 17–19, 20–16

Haining, China

August 4
15:30

Boxscore

Australia	112–43	Mali
Scoring by quarter: 21–19, 30–5, 30–15, 31–4

Haining, China

=== Group B ===
*All times are China Standard Time (UTC+8).

Qualified for the finals

Team	Pld	W	L	PF	PA	PD	Pts
United States	2	2	0	177	132	+45	4
Latvia	2	1	1	149	153	−4	3
Russia	2	0	2	127	168	−41	2

August 2
15:30

Boxscore

Russia	69–75	Latvia
Scoring by quarter: 14–12, 15–24, 21–15, 19–24

Haining, China

August 3
19:30

Boxscore

Latvia	74–84	United States
Scoring by quarter: 18–31, 20–16, 19–18, 17–19

Haining, China

August 4
19:30

Boxscore

United States	93–58	Russia
Scoring by quarter: 17–10, 26–9, 24–21, 26–18

Haining, China

== Final round ==
*All times are China Standard Time (UTC+8).

=== 5th place ===
August 5
14:00

Boxscore

Mali	52–79	Russia
Scoring by quarter: 15–19, 11–16, 10–26, 16–18

Haining, China

=== Third place ===
August 5
16:00

Boxscore

China	63–51	Latvia
Scoring by quarter: 19–11, 15–10, 14–16, 15–14

Haining, China

=== Final ===
August 5
19:30

Boxscore

Australia	67–71	United States
Scoring by quarter: 15–16, 14–19, 21–21, 17–15

Haining, China

== Final standings ==
The final standings per FIBA official website:

Pos	Team	Pld	W	L	PF	PA	PD	Pts
1st place, gold medalist(s)	United States	3	3	0	248	199	+49	6
2nd place, silver medalist(s)	Australia	3	2	1	263	184	+79	5
3rd place, bronze medalist(s)	China	3	2	1	224	202	+22	5
4	Latvia	3	1	2	200	216	−16	4
5	Russia	3	1	2	206	220	−14	4
6	Mali	3	0	3	162	282	−120	3

Source: FIBA

2008 FIBA Diamond Ball for Women winners

United States
First title
