= 2004 FIBA Diamond Ball for Women =

2004 FIBA Diamond Ball
Tournament details
- Arena: Heraklion, Greece
- Dates: August 5 – August 8

Final positions
- Champions: Australia (1st title)
- Runners-up: China
- Third place: Brazil
- Fourth place: Greece

Awards and statistics
- Top scorer(s): (Nigeria) Mfon Udoka (23.0 points per game)

The 2004 FIBA Diamond Ball was a basketball tournament held in Heraklion, Greece, from August 5 until August 8, 2004. The FIBA Diamond Ball was an official international basketball tournament organised by FIBA, held every Olympic year prior to the Olympics. It was the 1st edition of the FIBA Diamond Ball. The six participating teams were Australia, China host Greece, Brazil, Nigeria and South Korea.

The United States women's team did not participate in the 2004 event although they were the then-reigning World champions and Olympic champions.

== Participating teams ==
Group A	Group B
Australia; Greece; South Korea	Brazil; China; Nigeria

- Australia – Oceania champions
- Brazil – Americas champions
- China – Asian champions
- Nigeria – African champions
- Greece – Olympics host
- Russia – European champions → replaced by South Korea – Asia Cup 3rd place (China were Asia Cup champions)

== Preliminary round ==
=== Group A ===
All times are local Central European Summer Time (UTC+2).

Qualified for the finals

Team	Pld	W	L	PF	PA	PD	Pts
Australia	2	2	0	159	116	+43	4
Greece	2	1	1	127	137	−10	3
South Korea	2	0	2	121	154	−33	2

August 5
20:30

Boxscore

Greece	70–62	South Korea
Scoring by quarter: 24–14, 10–15, 25–12, 11–21

Heraklion, Greece

August 6
20:30

Boxscore

South Korea	59–84	Australia
Scoring by quarter: 11–22, 15–20, 15–24, 18–18

Heraklion, Greece

August 7
20:30

Boxscore

Australia	75–57	Greece
Scoring by quarter: 21–20, 23–18, 21–8, 10–11

Heraklion, Greece

=== Group B ===
All times are local Central European Summer Time (UTC+2).

Qualified for the finals

Team	Pld	W	L	PF	PA	PD	Pts
China	2	2	0	168	157	+11	4
Brazil	2	1	1	163	149	+14	3
Nigeria	2	0	2	135	160	−25	2

August 5
18:15

Boxscore

Brazil	78–63	Nigeria
Scoring by quarter: 20–13, 23–20, 15–15, 20–15

Heraklion, Greece

August 6
18:15

Boxscore

Nigeria	72–82	China
Scoring by quarter: 19–25, 17–25, 20–17, 16–15

Heraklion, Greece

August 7
18:15

Boxscore

China	86–85	Brazil
Scoring by quarter: 19–29, 23–13, 18–19, 26–24

Heraklion, Greece

== Final round ==
All times are local Central European Summer Time (UTC+2).

=== 5th place ===
August 8
16:00

Boxscore

South Korea	89–78	Nigeria
Scoring by quarter: 13–29, 28–20, 28–14, 20–15

Heraklion, Greece

=== Third place ===
August 8
18:15

Boxscore

Greece	70–73	Brazil
Scoring by quarter: 17–20, 18–18, 11–13, 24–22

Heraklion, Greece

=== Final ===
August 8
20:30

Boxscore

Australia	74–70	China
Scoring by quarter: 19–18, 22–18, 14–24, 19–10

Heraklion, Greece

== Final standings ==
The final standings per FIBA official website:

Pos	Team	Pld	W	L	PF	PA	PD	Pts
1st place, gold medalist(s)	Australia	3	3	0	233	186	+47	6
2nd place, silver medalist(s)	China	3	2	1	238	231	+7	5
3rd place, bronze medalist(s)	Brazil	3	2	1	236	219	+17	5
4	Greece	3	1	2	197	210	−13	4
5	South Korea	3	1	2	210	232	−22	4
6	Nigeria	3	0	3	213	249	−36	3

Source: FIBA

2004 FIBA Diamond Ball for Women winners

Australia
First title
