= FIBA Diamond Ball =

International basketball tournament

- Sport: Basketball
- Founded: 2000; 26 years ago
- Founder: FIBA
- First season: 2000
- Folded: 2008
- No. of teams: 6
- Country: FIBA member nations
- Continent: FIBA (International)
- Last champions: M: Argentina (1st title); W: United States (1st title)
- Most titles: M: Argentina, Australia, Serbia and Montenegro (1 title); W: United States, Australia (1 title)
- Related competitions: Summer Olympic Games
- Website: FIBA

The FIBA Diamond Ball competition was an official international basketball tournament organised by FIBA, held every Olympic year prior to the Summer Olympics. The first tournament was held in 2000, for men's teams only. In 2004 and 2008, tournaments were held for both men and women.

The competing teams are the host country of that year's Summer Olympics, defending the FIBA Diamond Ball champions, the reigning FIBA World Cup, Summer Olympics, and continental champions, minus the United States men's team.

The United States women's team did not participate in the 2004 event, although they were the then-reigning world champions. However, they did compete in the 2008 event, as the Americas champions.

The tournament was not held in 2012 and 2016, and the tournament is not on FIBA's schedule for the next Olympic-year calendar, 2020 in Tokyo.

== Men's results ==
Year	Host	Final			Third Place Match		
Year	Host	Champion	Score	Second Place	Third Place	Score	Fourth Place
2000; Details	Hong Kong	Australia	78–71	Yugoslavia	Italy	82–74	Canada
2004; Details	(Serbia and Montenegro); Belgrade	Serbia and Montenegro	93–80	Lithuania	Argentina	84–74	China
2008; Details	(China); Nanjing	Argentina	95–91	Australia	China	75–46	Iran

=== Medals summary ===
Rank	Nation	Gold	Silver	Bronze	Total
1	Australia	1	1	0	2
1	Serbia and Montenegro	1	1	0	2
3	Argentina	1	0	1	2
4	Lithuania	0	1	0	1
5	China	0	0	1	1
5	Italy	0	0	1	1
Totals (6 entries)		3	3	3	9

=== Participation Details ===
Team	(Hong Kong) 2000	(Serbia and Montenegro) 2004	(China) 2008	Total
Angola	6th	6th	6th	3
Argentina		3rd	1st	2
Australia	1st	5th	2nd	3
Canada	4th			1
China	5th	4th	3rd	3
Iran			4th	1
Italy	3rd			1
Lithuania		2nd		1
Serbia			5th	1
Serbia and Montenegro	2nd	1st		2

=== Top scorers ===
==== Points Per Game ====
Year	Player	Position	Team	Points Per Game
2000	Steve Nash	PG	Canada	22.0
2004	Yao Ming	C	China	22.0
2008	Luis Scola	PF	Argentina	20.0

==== Final ====
Year	Player	Position	Team	Points
2000	Ricky Grace	SG	Australia	16
2004	Igor Rakocevic	SG	Serbia	19
2008	Manu Ginobili	F	Argentina	24

== Women's results ==
Year	Host	Final			Third Place Match		
Year	Host	Champion	Score	Second Place	Third Place	Score	Fourth Place
2004; Details	(Greece); Heraklion	Australia	74–70	China	Brazil	73–70	Greece
2008; Details	(China); Haining	United States	71–67	Australia	China	63–51	Latvia

=== Medals summary ===
Rank	Nation	Gold	Silver	Bronze	Total
1	Australia	1	1	0	2
2	United States	1	0	0	1
3	China	0	1	1	2
4	Brazil	0	0	1	1
Totals (4 entries)		2	2	2	6

=== Participation Details ===
Team	(Greece) 2004	(China) 2008	Total
Australia	1st	2nd	2
Brazil	3rd		1
China	2nd	3rd	2
Greece	4th		1
South Korea	5th		1
Latvia		4th	1
Mali		6th	1
Nigeria	6th		1
Russia		5th	1
United States		1st	1

== See also ==
- Acropolis Tournament
- Basketball at the Summer Olympics
- FIBA Basketball World Cup
- FIBA Asia Cup
- Adecco Cup
- Marchand Continental Championship Cup
- Belgrade Trophy
- Stanković Cup
- William Jones Cup
