= Saeed Armaghani =

Iranian basketball player

Saeed Armaghani (born in 1962) is an Iranian-Hungarian professional basketball coach and former player.

As a player, Armaghani played as a point guard for MAFC Budapest during the 1988–89 season.

== Teams coached ==
- Iran national basketball team (2001–02) - Head coach
- Kaveh Tehran (2006–08) - Director
- Vasas SC (2008) - Sport director
- Óbudai Kaszások (2018-) - Head Coach (NB1)

== Honours ==
- Ronchetti Cup, 1998
