= Enayatollah Atashi =

Iranian basketball coach (1945–2026)

Enayatollah Atashi (Persian: عنایت‌الله آتشی; 7 August 1945 – 28 April 2026) was an Iranian basketball coach. He worked for IRIB Varzesh and IRIB TV3, Iranian television channels as basketball commentator.

Atashi was born in Jahrom on 7 August 1945, and died on 28 April 2026, at the age of 80. He was the father of Mehrad Atashi, who became a professional basketball player.

== Pro career ==
- Head coach
  - Head coach of Iran national team (1983), (1998)

== Books ==
- Basketball over Time, a book on the history of basketball
