= 2004 FIBA Diamond Ball =

Tournament details
- Arena: Belgrade Arena; Belgrade, Serbia and Montenegro
- Dates: July 31 – August 3

Final positions
- Champions: Serbia and Montenegro (1st title)
- Runners-up: Lithuania
- Third place: Argentina
- Fourth place: China

Awards and statistics
- Top scorer(s): (China) Yao Ming (22.0 points per game)

The 2004 FIBA Diamond Ball was a basketball tournament held in Belgrade, Serbia and Montenegro, from July 31 until August 3, 2004. The FIBA Diamond Ball was an official international basketball tournament organised by FIBA, held every Olympic year prior to the Olympics. It was the 2nd edition of the FIBA Diamond Ball. The six participating teams were Angola, Argentina, Australia, host Serbia and Montenegro, China and Lithuania.

== Participating teams ==
Group A	Group B
Angola; Argentina; Lithuania	Australia; China; Serbia and Montenegro

- Angola – African champions
- Argentina – Americas runners-up (USA were Olympic & Americas champions)
- Australia – Oceania champions & 2000 FIBA Diamond Ball winners
- China – Asian champions
- Lithuania – European champions (Greece were Olympics hosts)
- Serbia and Montenegro – World champions

== Preliminary round ==
Qualified for the finals

=== Group A ===
All times are local Central European Summer Time (UTC+2).

Team	Pld	W	L	PF	PA	PD	Pts
Lithuania	2	2	0	174	147	+27	4
Argentina	2	1	1	146	153	−7	3
Angola	2	0	2	131	151	−20	2

July 31
18:30

Boxscore

Argentina	67–63	Angola
Scoring by quarter: 12–17, 18–22, 17–12, 20–12

Belgrade, Serbia and Montenegro

August 1
18:30

Boxscore

Angola	68–84	Lithuania
Scoring by quarter: 18–27, 15–18, 22–17, 13–22

Belgrade, Serbia and Montenegro

August 2
18:30

Boxscore

Lithuania	90–79	Argentina
Scoring by quarter: 21–25, 16–15, 16–27, 37–12

Belgrade, Serbia and Montenegro

=== Group B ===
All times are local Central European Summer Time (UTC+2).

Qualified for the finals

Team	Pld	W	L	PF	PA	PD	Pts
Serbia and Montenegro	2	2	0	171	139	+32	4
China	2	1	1	162	174	−12	3
Australia	2	0	2	143	163	−20	2

July 31
21:00

Boxscore

Serbia and Montenegro	92–78	China
Scoring by quarter: 19–17, 23–25, 29–11, 21–25

Belgrade, Serbia and Montenegro

August 1
21:00

Boxscore

China	84–82	Australia
Scoring by quarter: 21–13, 16–16, 23–27, 24–26

Belgrade, Serbia and Montenegro

August 2
21:00

Boxscore

Australia	61–79	Serbia and Montenegro
Scoring by quarter: 15–13, 10–30, 18–21, 18–15

Belgrade, Serbia and Montenegro

== Final round ==
All times are local Central European Summer Time (UTC+2).

=== 5th place ===
August 3
16:00

Boxscore

Angola	64–70	Australia
Scoring by quarter: 21–19, 6–21, 18–14, 19–16

Belgrade, Serbia and Montenegro

=== Third place ===
August 3
18:30

Boxscore

Argentina	84–74	China
Scoring by quarter: 23–21, 21–16, 18–29, 22–8

Belgrade, Serbia and Montenegro

=== Final ===
August 1
21:00

Boxscore

Lithuania	80–93	Serbia and Montenegro
Scoring by quarter: 21–22, 18–30, 17–20, 24–21

Belgrade, Serbia and Montenegro

== Final standings ==
The final standings per FIBA official website:

Pos	Team	Pld	W	L	PF	PA	PD	Pts
1st place, gold medalist(s)	Serbia and Montenegro	3	3	0	264	219	+45	6
2nd place, silver medalist(s)	Lithuania	3	2	1	254	240	+14	5
3rd place, bronze medalist(s)	Argentina	3	2	1	230	227	+3	5
4	China	3	1	2	236	258	−22	4
5	Australia	3	1	2	213	227	−14	4
6	Angola	3	0	3	195	221	−26	3

Source: FIBA

2004 FIBA Diamond Ball winners

Serbia and Montenegro
First title

== See also ==
- Acropolis Tournament
- Basketball at the Summer Olympics
- FIBA Basketball World Cup
- FIBA Asia Cup
- Adecco Cup
- Marchand Continental Championship Cup
- Belgrade Trophy
- Stanković Cup
- William Jones Cup
- List of events held in Belgrade Arena
