= Belgrade Trophy =

International basketball competition

- Sport: Basketball
- Founded: 2012; 14 years ago
- First season: 2012
- Owner: Basketball Federation of Serbia
- No. of teams: 3 or 4
- Countries: FIBA members
- Venues: Aleksandar Nikolić Hall; Kombank Arena
- Most recent champion: Serbia (5th title)
- Most titles: Serbia (5 titles)

The Belgrade Trophy (Serbian: Трофеј Београда/Trofej Beograda) is an international basketball competition between national teams, which has been held annually since 2012 and takes place in Belgrade, Serbia each summer, before the big official FIBA tournaments, such as the FIBA EuroBasket, the FIBA World Cup, and the Summer Olympic Games. The tournament is organized by the Basketball Federation of Serbia. The competition is played under FIBA rules.

All five editions of the tournament held so far have been won by Serbia, which has won all ten games it played, by an average margin of 24.8 points. The 2017 edition of the tournament was the first one with three participating teams competing in a round-robin tournament, replacing previous format with four participating teams competing in a single-elimination tournament.

== Standings ==
Year	Arena	1st place	2nd place	3rd place	4th Place	Tournament MVP
2012 details	Pionir Hall	Serbia	Turkey	Slovenia	Hungary	(Serbia) Miloš Teodosić
2013 details	Kombank Arena	Serbia	Slovenia	Turkey	Ukraine	(Serbia) Nenad Krstić
2014 details	Kombank Arena	Serbia	Turkey	Puerto Rico	Argentina	(Serbia) Stefan Marković
2015 details	Kombank Arena	Serbia	Russia	China	Venezuela	(Serbia) Miloš Teodosić
2016 details	—N/a	Tournament not held. See: 2016 FIBA World Olympic Qualifying Tournament – Belgrade				—N/a
2017 details	Aleksandar Nikolić Hall	Serbia	Greece	Montenegro	—N/a	(Serbia) Bogdan Bogdanović
2018	—N/a	Tournament not held.				—N/a
2019	—N/a	Tournament not held.				—N/a
2020	—N/a	Tournament not held.				—N/a
2021	—N/a	Tournament not held. See: 2020 FIBA Men's Olympic Qualifying Tournaments – Belgrade				—N/a

=== Results by country ===
Rank	Country	1st place	2nd place	3rd place	4th place	Appearances
1.	Serbia	5	0	0	0	5
2.	Turkey	0	2	1	0	3
3.	Slovenia	0	1	1	0	2
4.	Russia	0	1	0	0	1
5.	Greece	0	1	0	0	1
6.	Puerto Rico	0	0	1	0	1
7.	China	0	0	1	0	1
8.	Montenegro	0	0	1	0	1
9.	Venezuela	0	0	0	1	1
10.	Argentina	0	0	0	1	1
11.	Ukraine	0	0	0	1	1
12.	Hungary	0	0	0	1	1

== Tournament history ==
=== 2012 ===
==== Semifinals ====
8 August 2012

Turkey	80–77	Slovenia

Pionir Hall, Belgrade

8 August 2012

Serbia	95–60	Hungary

Pionir Hall, Belgrade

==== 3rd place match ====
9 August 2012

Slovenia	79–70	Hungary

Pionir Hall, Belgrade

==== Finals ====
9 August 2012

Serbia	89–79	Turkey

Pionir Hall, Belgrade

=== 2013 ===
==== Semifinals ====
10 August 2013

Slovenia	55–54	Turkey

Kombank Arena, Belgrade

10 August 2013

Serbia	96–68	Ukraine

Kombank Arena, Belgrade

==== 3rd place match ====
11 August 2013

Turkey	72–64	Ukraine

Kombank Arena, Belgrade

==== Finals ====
11 August 2013

Serbia	91–66	Slovenia

Kombank Arena, Belgrade

=== 2014 ===
==== Semifinals ====
16 August 2014

Turkey	77–66	Puerto Rico

Kombank Arena, Belgrade

16 August 2014

Serbia	85–67	Argentina

Kombank Arena, Belgrade

==== 3rd place match ====
17 August 2014

Puerto Rico	97–87	Argentina

Kombank Arena, Belgrade

==== Finals ====
17 August 2014

Serbia	79–64	Turkey

Kombank Arena, Belgrade

=== 2015 ===
==== Semifinals ====
15 August 2015

Russia	66–55	Venezuela

Kombank Arena, Belgrade

15 August 2015

Serbia	95–55	China

Kombank Arena, Belgrade

==== 3rd place match ====
16 August 2015

China	63–57	Venezuela

Kombank Arena, Belgrade

==== Finals ====
16 August 2015

Serbia	95–61	Russia

Kombank Arena, Belgrade

=== 2016 ===
Belgrade Trophy was not held in 2016, due to the participation of Serbia national team at the 2016 FIBA World Olympic Qualifying Tournament – Belgrade, one of three 2016 FIBA World Olympic Qualifying Tournaments for Men, which was held in Kombank Arena in July 2016.

=== 2017 ===
==== Standings ====
Team	Pld	W	L	PF	PA	PD	Pts
Serbia	2	2	0	175	132	+43	4
Greece	2	1	1	144	174	−30	3
Montenegro	2	0	2	152	165	−13	2

==== Matches ====
11 August 2017	Montenegro	81–83	Greece	Aleksandar Nikolić Hall, Belgrade
21:00	Scoring by quarter: 20–18, 16–20, 17–21, 28–24
	Pts: Ivanović 22; Rebs: Vučević 9 Asts: Vučević, Rice 4		Pts: G. Antetokounmpo 20; Rebs: G. Antetokounmpo 9 Asts: Sloukas 6	Attendance: 1,500; Referees: Jevtović, Ninković, Prpa

12 August 2017	Serbia	93–61	Greece	Aleksandar Nikolić Hall, Belgrade
21:00	Scoring by quarter: 23–15, 22–7, 21–14, 27–25
	Pts: Bogdanović 14; Rebs: Mačvan 5 Asts: Bogdanović 9		Pts: Bourousis 13; Rebs: Bourousis, Printezis; Asts: Mantzaris 3	Attendance: 6,000; Referees: Juras, Obrknežević, Prpa

13 August 2017	Serbia	82–71	Montenegro	Aleksandar Nikolić Hall, Belgrade
21:00	Scoring by quarter: 19–24, 27–13, 18–18, 18–16
	Pts: Bogdanović 25; Rebs: Kuzmić 7 Asts: Bogdanović, Micić 5		Pts: Dubljević 13; Rebs: Vučević 10; Asts: Rice 5	Attendance: 6,000; Referees: Obrknežević, Jevtović, Ninković

=== 2018–2021 ===
Belgrade Trophy was not held in 2018 since there was no major FIBA-organized international tournament scheduled for that year. In 2019, no tournament was held prior to the 2019 FIBA Basketball World Cup, and in 2020, 2020 Summer Olympics were postponed due to the COVID-19 pandemic, marking another year with no major international basketball competition. In 2021, like in 2016, instead of the Belgrade Trophy, one of the 2020 Olympic Qualifying Tournaments was held in Belgrade. After four consecutive years with no tournament held, and no official announcements regarding the tournament from the Basketball Federation of Serbia, the future of Belgrade Trophy remains uncertain.

== See also ==
- Acropolis Tournament
- Basketball at the Summer Olympics
- FIBA Basketball World Cup
- FIBA Asia Cup
- FIBA Diamond Ball
- Adecco Cup
- Marchand Continental Championship Cup
- Stanković Cup
- William Jones Cup

== Sponsors ==
- Acıbadem Healthcare Group
