= 2002 FIBA World Championship =

2002 edition of the FIBA World Championship

Tournament details
- Host country: United States
- City: Indianapolis
- Dates: August 29 – September 8
- Officially opened by: George W. Bush
- Teams: 16 (from 5 confederations)
- Venue(s): RCA Dome; Conseco Fieldhouse

Final positions
- Champions: Yugoslavia (2nd title)
- Runners-up: Argentina
- Third place: Germany
- Fourth place: New Zealand

Tournament statistics
- Games played: 62
- MVP: (Germany) Dirk Nowitzki
- Top scorer: (Germany) Dirk Nowitzki (24.0 points per game)

The 2002 FIBA World Championship was the 14th edition of the FIBA World Championship, the international basketball world championship for men's national teams. The tournament was held by the International Basketball Federation in Indianapolis, Indiana, United States, from August 29 to September 8, 2002.

== Venues ==
Indianapolis
RCA Dome; Capacity: 57,980	2002 FIBA World Championship is located in Indianapolis	Conseco Fieldhouse; Capacity: 18,345
United States
2002 FIBA World Championship is located in the United States

== Qualification ==
There were 16 teams taking part in the 2002 World Cup of Basketball. Since the 2000 Olympic champions United States had direct access to the World Championship as the host nation, the Olympic berth was replaced by an extra qualifying spot assigned to FIBA Americas below.

- Host nation: 1 berth
- FIBA Asia: 14 teams competing for 2 berths
- FIBA Africa: 12 teams competing for 2 berths
- FIBA Americas: 10 teams competing for 5 berths
- FIBA Europe: 16 teams competing for 5 berths
- FIBA Oceania: 2 teams competing for 1 berth

=== Qualified teams ===
Event	Date	Location	Berths	Qualified
Host nation			1	United States
2001 ABC Championship	July 20–28, 2001	(China) Shanghai	2	China; Lebanon
FIBA Africa Championship 2001	August 4–12, 2001	(Morocco) Rabat and Casablanca	2	Angola; Algeria
FIBA Americas Championship 2001	August 16–26, 2001	(Argentina) Neuquén	5	Argentina; Brazil; Canada; Puerto Rico; Venezuela
EuroBasket 2001	August 31–September 9, 2001	(Turkey) Ankara, Antalya and Istanbul	5	Yugoslavia; Turkey; Spain; Germany; Russia
FIBA Oceania Championship 2001	September 21–23, 2001	(New Zealand) Auckland, Wellington and Hamilton	1	New Zealand
TOTAL			16	

== Squads ==
At the start of tournament, all 16 participating countries had 12 players on their roster.

== Competing nations ==
The following nations' teams competed:

Group A	Group B	Group C	Group D
Angola; Canada; Spain; Yugoslavia	Brazil; Lebanon; Puerto Rico; Turkey	Algeria; China; Germany; United States	Argentina; New Zealand; Russia; Venezuela

== Preliminary round ==
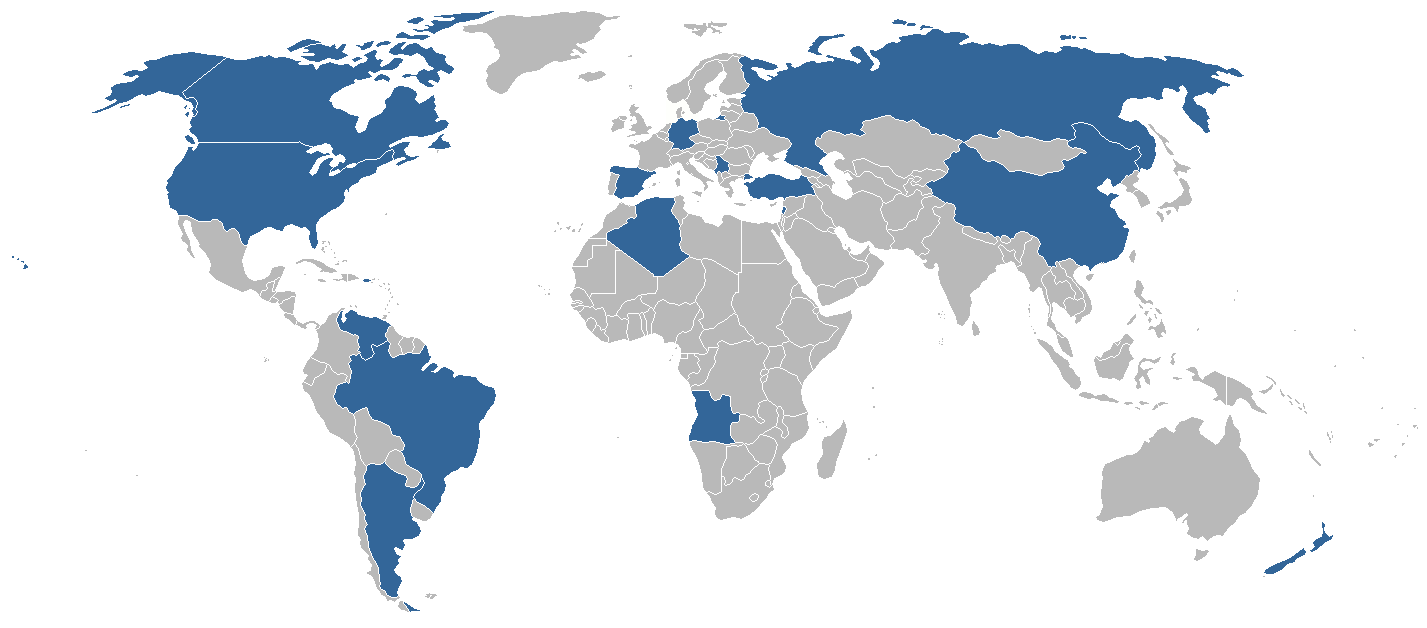
Competing teams

The top three teams in each group advance to the second round, into either Group E or F. The fourth place team in each group moves onto the 13th–16th classification.

=== Group A ===
Pos	Team	Pld	W	L	PF	PA	PD	Pts	Qualification
1	Spain	3	3	0	244	178	+66	6	Second round
2	Yugoslavia	3	2	1	269	205	+64	5	Second round
3	Angola	3	1	2	202	275	−73	4	Second round
4	Canada	3	0	3	199	256	−57	3	13th–16th classification round

Source: FIBA archive
Rules for classification: 1) points; 2) head-to-head points; 3) head-to-head goal average; 4) head-to-head number of points scored.

August 29, 2002

Yugoslavia	113–63	Angola	Conseco Fieldhouse
Canada	54–85	Spain	Conseco Fieldhouse

August 30, 2002

Angola	84–74	Canada	RCA Dome
Spain	71–69	Yugoslavia	RCA Dome

August 31, 2002

Angola	55–88	Spain	RCA Dome
Canada	71–87	Yugoslavia	Conseco Fieldhouse

=== Group B ===
Pos	Team	Pld	W	L	PF	PA	PD	Pts	Qualification
1	Brazil	3	3	0	280	245	+35	6	Second round
2	Puerto Rico	3	2	1	263	242	+21	5	Second round
3	Turkey	3	1	2	268	246	+22	4	Second round
4	Lebanon	3	0	3	230	308	−78	3	13th–16th classification round

Source: FIBA archive
Rules for classification: 1) points; 2) head-to-head points; 3) head-to-head goal average; 4) head-to-head number of points scored.

August 29, 2002

Brazil	102–73	Lebanon	RCA Dome
Puerto Rico	78–75	Turkey	RCA Dome

August 30, 2002

Lebanon	77–99	Puerto Rico	Conseco Fieldhouse
Turkey	86–88	Brazil	Conseco Fieldhouse

August 31, 2002

Lebanon	80–107	Turkey	Conseco Fieldhouse
Puerto Rico	86–90	Brazil	Conseco Fieldhouse

=== Group C ===
Pos	Team	Pld	W	L	PF	PA	PD	Pts	Qualification
1	United States (H)	3	3	0	298	212	+86	6	Second round
2	Germany	3	2	1	277	250	+27	5	Second round
3	China	3	1	2	237	254	−17	4	Second round
4	Algeria	3	0	3	212	308	−96	3	13th–16th classification round

Source: FIBA archive
Rules for classification: 1) points; 2) head-to-head points; 3) head-to-head goal average; 4) head-to-head number of points scored.
(H) Hosts

August 29, 2002

China	76–88	Germany	RCA Dome
United States	110–60	Algeria	RCA Dome

August 30, 2002

Germany	87–104	United States	RCA Dome
Algeria	82–96	China	Conseco Fieldhouse

August 31, 2002

Algeria	70–102	Germany	Conseco Fieldhouse
China	65–84	United States	RCA Dome

=== Group D ===
Pos	Team	Pld	W	L	PF	PA	PD	Pts	Qualification
1	Argentina	3	3	0	319	238	+81	6	Second round
2	New Zealand	3	2	1	273	278	−5	5	Second round
3	Russia	3	1	2	248	259	−11	4	Second round
4	Venezuela	3	0	3	226	291	−65	3	13th–16th classification round

Source: FIBA archive
Rules for classification: 1) points; 2) head-to-head points; 3) head-to-head goal average; 4) head-to-head number of points scored.

August 29, 2002

New Zealand	90–81	Russia	Conseco Fieldhouse
Argentina	107–72	Venezuela	Conseco Fieldhouse

August 30, 2002

Venezuela	85–98	New Zealand	RCA Dome
Russia	81–100	Argentina	Conseco Fieldhouse

August 31, 2002

Venezuela	69–86	Russia	RCA Dome
New Zealand	85–112	Argentina	RCA Dome

== Second round ==
In this stage, the results in the preliminary rounds are combined and the teams who met previously do not play each other a second time. The teams that advanced from Group A and Group B are combined into Group E and teams that advanced from Group C and Group D are combined into Group F.

The top four from each group advance to the knockout stages; the bottom two advance to the Ninth-to-twelfth-place playoffs.

=== Group E ===
Pos	Team	Pld	W	L	PF	PA	PD	Pts	Qualification
1	Puerto Rico	6	5	1	510	488	+22	11 (Note: Head-to-head record: Puerto Rico 1–0 Spain)	Quarterfinals
2	Spain	6	5	1	480	391	+89	11	Quarterfinals
3	Yugoslavia	6	4	2	562	437	+125	10 (Note: Head-to-head record: FR Yugoslavia 1–0 Brazil)	Quarterfinals
4	Brazil	6	4	2	502	502	0	10	Quarterfinals
5	Turkey	6	2	4	496	509	−13	8	9th–12th classification round
6	Angola	6	1	5	438	536	−98	7	9th–12th classification round

Source: FIBA archive
Rules for classification: 1) points; 2) head-to-head points; 3) head-to-head goal average; 4) head-to-head number of points scored.
Notes:

September 2, 2002

Puerto Rico	85–83		Yugoslavia	Conseco Fieldhouse
Turkey	64–87		Spain	RCA Dome
Brazil	86–83	OT	Angola	Conseco Fieldhouse

September 3, 2002

Angola	66–86	Turkey	Conseco Fieldhouse
Spain	65–73	Puerto Rico	RCA Dome
Yugoslavia	90–69	Brazil	RCA Dome

September 4, 2002

Puerto Rico	89–87	2OT	Angola	RCA Dome
Turkey	78–110		Yugoslavia	Conseco Fieldhouse
Brazil	67–84		Spain	RCA Dome

=== Group F ===
Pos	Team	Pld	W	L	PF	PA	PD	Pts	Qualification
1	Argentina	6	6	0	587	466	+121	12	Quarterfinals
2	United States (H)	6	5	1	605	443	+162	11	Quarterfinals
3	Germany	6	4	2	541	485	+56	10	Quarterfinals
4	New Zealand	6	3	3	493	560	−67	9	Quarterfinals
5	Russia	6	2	4	520	536	−16	8	9th–12th classification round
6	China	6	1	5	464	538	−74	7	9th–12th classification round

Source: FIBA archive
Rules for classification: 1) points; 2) head-to-head points; 3) head-to-head goal average; 4) head-to-head number of points scored.
(H) Hosts

September 2, 2002

New Zealand	64–84	Germany	RCA Dome
Russia	82–106	United States	Conseco Fieldhouse
Argentina	95–71	China	RCA Dome

September 3, 2002

China	68–95	Russia	RCA Dome
United States	110–62	New Zealand	Conseco Fieldhouse
Germany	77–86	Argentina	Conseco Fieldhouse

September 4, 2002

New Zealand	94–88	China	Conseco Fieldhouse
Russia	85–103	Germany	RCA Dome
Argentina	87–80	United States	Conseco Fieldhouse

== Classification round ==
=== 13th–16th classification ===
Thirteenth to sixteenth
September 2, 2002
Canada	91
Lebanon	67
September 2, 2002
Algeria	83
Venezuela	98

Thirteenth place
September 3, 2002
Canada	98
Venezuela	97
Fifteenth place
September 3, 2002
Lebanon	70
Algeria	100

==== Semifinals ====
September 2

Canada	91–67	Lebanon
Scoring by quarter: 22-16, 22-15, 23-22, 24-14

RCA Dome, Indianapolis

September 2

Algeria	83–98	Venezuela
Scoring by quarter: 24-20, 24-29, 16-22, 19-27

Conseco Fieldhouse, Indianapolis

==== Fifteenth place playoff ====
September 3

Lebanon	70–100	Algeria
Scoring by quarter: 26-23, 17-19, 15-34, 12-24

RCA Dome, Indianapolis

==== Thirteenth place playoff ====
September 3

Canada	98–97	Venezuela
Scoring by quarter: 25-23, 26-26, 27-28, 20-20

Conseco Fieldhouse, Indianapolis

=== 9th–12th classification ===
Ninth to twelfth
September 6, 2002
Turkey	94
China	86
September 6, 2002
Angola	66
Russia	77

Ninth place
September 7, 2002
Turkey	91
Russia	86
Eleventh place
September 7, 2002
China	84
Angola	96

==== Semifinals ====
September 6

Turkey	94–86	China
Scoring by quarter: 30-24, 18-16, 19-22, 27-24

Conseco Fieldhouse, Indianapolis

September 6

Russia	77–66	Angola
Scoring by quarter: 28-18, 13-24, 16-8, 20-16

Conseco Fieldhouse, Indianapolis

==== Eleventh place playoff ====
September 7

China	84–96	Angola
Scoring by quarter: 18-27, 31-24, 9-29, 26-16

Conseco Fieldhouse, Indianapolis

==== Ninth place playoff ====
September 7

Turkey	91–86	Russia
Scoring by quarter: 22-28, 25-25, 15-18, 29-15

Conseco Fieldhouse, Indianapolis

=== 5th–8th classification ===
Fifth to eighth
September 6, 2002
Puerto Rico	74
United States	84
September 6, 2002
Spain	105
Brazil	89

Fifth place
September 7, 2002
United States	75
Spain	81
Seventh place
September 7, 2002
Puerto Rico	91
Brazil	84

==== Semifinals ====
September 6

Puerto Rico	74–84	United States
Scoring by quarter: 25-19, 11-31, 21-17, 17-17

Conseco Fieldhouse, Indianapolis

September 6

Spain	105–89	Brazil
Scoring by quarter: 29-21, 25-26, 34-17, 17-25

Conseco Fieldhouse, Indianapolis

==== Seventh place playoff ====
September 7

Puerto Rico	91–84	Brazil
Scoring by quarter: 26-20, 20-27, 17-14, 28-23

Conseco Fieldhouse, Indianapolis

==== Fifth place playoff ====
September 7

United States	75–81	Spain
Scoring by quarter: 27-18, 23-22, 15-16, 10-25

Conseco Fieldhouse, Indianapolis

== Final round ==
Quarter-finals
September 5, 2002
Puerto Rico	63
New Zealand	65
September 5, 2002
Yugoslavia	81
United States	78
September 5, 2002
Spain	62
Germany	70
September 5, 2002
Brazil	67
Argentina	78

Semi-finals
September 7, 2002
New Zealand	78
Yugoslavia	89
September 7, 2002
Germany	80
Argentina	86

Final
September 8, 2002
Yugoslavia (OT)	84
Argentina	77
Third place
September 8, 2002
New Zealand	94
Germany	117

=== Quarterfinals ===
September 5
17:30

Boxscore

Spain	62–70	Germany
Scoring by quarter: 15–20, 16–20, 21–6, 10–24
Pts: Navarro 21; Rebs: Jiménez 9 Asts: Rodríguez 5		Pts: Nowitzki 20; Rebs: Okulaja 8 Asts: Demirel 4

Conseco Fieldhouse, Indianapolis
Attendance: 1,000
Referees: Iztok Rems (SVN), Stefano Cazzaro (ITA)

September 5
17:30

Boxscore

Argentina	78–67	Brazil
Scoring by quarter: 18–16, 11–13, 22–13, 27–25
Pts: Oberto 19; Rebs: Oberto 8 Asts: Ginóbili 5		Pts: Mazzuchini 20; Rebs: Varejão 7 Asts: Klafke 3

RCA Dome, Indianapolis
Attendance: 2,000
Referees: Reynaldo Mercedes (DOM), Memduh Öget (TUR)

September 5
20:00

Boxscore

Puerto Rico	63–65	New Zealand
Scoring by quarter: 11–14, 18–17, 15–17, 19–18
Pts: Ayuso 24; Rebs: Ortiz 10; Asts: Arroyo 7		Pts: Jones 21; Rebs: Boucher 8 Asts: Dickel 8

RCA Dome, Indianapolis
Attendance: 4,378
Referees: Romuladas Brazauskas (LTU), Efim Resser (BRA)

September 5
20:00

Boxscore

United States	78–81	Yugoslavia
Scoring by quarter: 20–20, 16–20, 22–12, 20–29
Pts: Miller, Pierce 19; Rebs: O'Neal 8 Asts: Miller 7		Pts: Stojaković 20; Rebs: Divac 11; Asts: Stojaković 4

Conseco Fieldhouse, Indianapolis
Attendance: 5,362
Referees: Nikolaos Pitsilkas (GRE), Carlos Renato dos Santos (BRA)

=== Semifinals ===
September 7
13:15

Boxscore

Germany	80–86	Argentina
Scoring by quarter: 11–16, 30–20, 21–23, 18–27
Pts: Nowitzki 24; Rebs: Nowitzki 11; Asts: Demirel 5		Pts: Sconochini 18; Rebs: Wolkowyski 7 Asts: Sánchez 6

Conseco Fieldhouse, Indianapolis
Attendance: 2,000
Referees: Iztok Rems (SVN), Carlos Renato dos Santos (BRA)

September 7
15:30

Boxscore

New Zealand	78–89	Yugoslavia
Scoring by quarter: 30–19, 18–20, 10–27, 20–23
Pts: Penney 24; Rebs: Cameron 8 Asts: Dickel 5		Pts: Koturović 18; Rebs: Jarić 8 Asts: Jarić 6

Conseco Fieldhouse, Indianapolis
Attendance: 7,000
Referees: Eduardo Sancha (ESP), Yosuke Miyatake (JPN)

=== Third place playoff ===
September 8
12:30

Boxscore

New Zealand	94–117	Germany
Scoring by quarter: 27–35, 21–39, 13–22, 33–21
Pts: Jones 26; Rebs: Boucher 7 Asts: Cameron 8		Pts: Nowitzki 29; Rebs: Nowitzki 8 Asts: Demirel 7

Conseco Fieldhouse, Indianapolis
Attendance: 2,000
Referees: Stefano Cazzaro (ITA), Pablo Alberto Estevez (ARG)

=== Final ===
September 8
15:00

Boxscore

Yugoslavia	84–77 (OT)	Argentina
Scoring by quarter: 24–19, 17–20, 11–18, 23–18, Overtime: 9–2
Pts: Bodiroga 27; Rebs: Koturović 9 Asts: Bodiroga 3		Pts: Oberto 28; Rebs: Oberto 10; Asts: Sánchez 6

Conseco Fieldhouse, Indianapolis
Attendance: 17,079
Referees: Nikolaos Pitsilkas (GRE), Reynaldo Mercedes (DOM)

== Awards ==
2002 World Championship winner

Yugoslavia
Second title

Tournament MVP
(Germany) Dirk Nowitzki

== Final standings ==
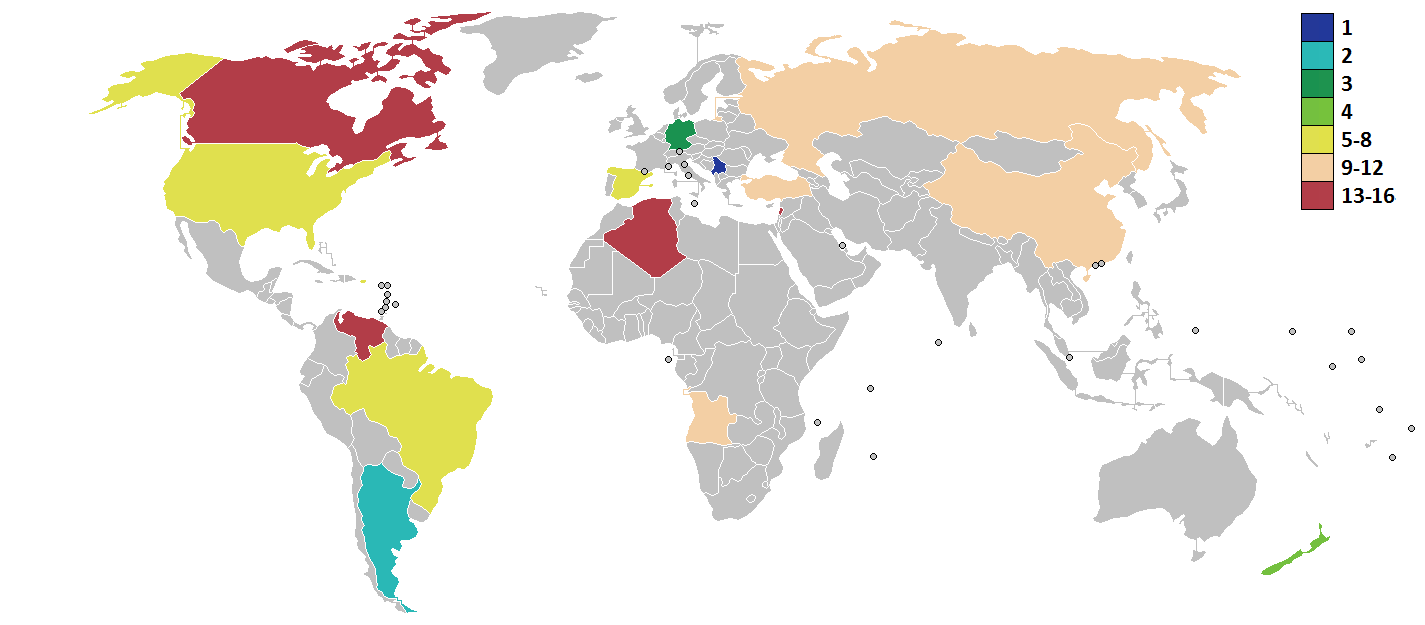
2002 FIBA World Championship final rankings.

Rank	Team	Record
1	Yugoslavia	7–2
2	Argentina	8–1
3	Germany	6–3
4	New Zealand	4–5
5	Spain	7–2
6	United States	6–3
7	Puerto Rico	6–3
8	Brazil	4–5
9	Turkey	4–4
10	Russia	3–5
11	Angola	2–6
12	China	1–7
13	Canada	2–3
14	Venezuela	1–4
15	Algeria	1–4
16	Lebanon	0–5

== All tournament team ==
Guard	Center	Forward
(Argentina) Manu Ginóbili (Federal Republic of Yugoslavia) Peja Stojaković	(China) Yao Ming	(Germany) Dirk Nowitzki — MVP (New Zealand) Pero Cameron

== Top scorers (ppg) ==
1. (Germany) Dirk Nowitzki - 24.0
2. (Venezuela) Victor Díaz - 22.0
3. (China) Yao Ming - 21.0
4. (Brazil) Marcelo Machado - 20.8
5. (United States) Paul Pierce - 19.7
6. (Spain) Pau Gasol - 19.1
7. (Puerto Rico) Larry Ayuso - 18.7
8. (Federal Republic of Yugoslavia) Peja Stojaković - 18.7
9. (New Zealand) Phill Jones - 18.2
10. (Lebanon) Fadi El Khatib - 17.6
