= Serbia and Montenegro men's national basketball team =

Represented Serbia and Montenegro in international basketball competition

Serbia and Montenegro (2003–2006) FR Yugoslavia (1992–2003)
- FIBA ranking: Defunct
- Joined FIBA: 1992
- FIBA zone: FIBA Europe
- National federation: Basketball Federation of Serbia and Montenegro

Olympic Games
- Appearances: 3
- Medals: (silver) Silver: (1996)

FIBA World Cup
- Appearances: 3
- Medals: (gold) Gold: (1998, 2002)

EuroBasket
- Appearances: 6
- Medals: (gold) Gold: (1995, 1997, 2001); (bronze) Bronze: (1999)
| Home | Away |
Medal record
| Event | 1st | 2nd | 3rd |
|---|---|---|---|
| Olympic Games | 0 | 1 | 0 |
| FIBA World Cup | 2 | 0 | 0 |
| EuroBasket | 3 | 0 | 1 |
| Diamond Ball | 1 | 1 | 0 |
| Mediterranean Games | 0 | 0 | 1 |
| Total | 6 | 2 | 2 |
Olympic Games
| Silver medal – second place | 1996 Atlanta | |
FIBA World Cup
| Gold medal – first place | 1998 Greece | |
| Gold medal – first place | 2002 USA | |
EuroBasket
| Gold medal – first place | 1995 Greece | |
| Gold medal – first place | 1997 Spain | |
| Gold medal – first place | 2001 Turkey | |
| Bronze medal – third place | 1999 France | |
FIBA Diamond Ball
| Silver medal – second place | 2000 Hong Kong | |
| Gold medal – first place | 2004 Belgrade | |
Mediterranean Games
| Bronze medal – third place | 1997 Bari | |

The Serbia and Montenegro men's national basketball team (Serbian: Кошаркашка репрезентација Србије и Црне Горе, romanized: Košarkaška reprezentacija Srbije i Crne Gore) also widely known as the FR Yugoslavia men's national basketball team, represented Serbia and Montenegro in international basketball competition, from 1993 to 2006. It was governed by the Basketball Federation of Serbia and Montenegro.

== History ==
After the breakup of Yugoslavia, in 1991–1992, the original senior Yugoslav national basketball team was dissolved. Bosnia and Herzegovina (Bosnian and Herzegovina NT), Croatia (Croatian NT), Macedonia (Macedonian NT) (later known as North Macedonia), and Slovenia (Slovenia) then formed their own senior national teams. While the then remaining and smaller Yugoslavia (originally known as FR Yugoslavia, and later as Serbia and Montenegro) formed its own senior national team.

That senior national team was originally named either "Yugoslavia national basketball team", or "FR Yugoslavia national basketball team", from 1992 until 2003, after the country's name at the time. In 2003, after the country was renamed from FR Yugoslavia to Serbia and Montenegro, the team was also renamed to "Serbia and Montenegro national basketball team". After Serbia and Montenegro split up, in 2006, and became the independent countries of Serbia and Montenegro, they each formed their own successor national teams. The senior Serbian national basketball team's first appearance at a major FIBA competition was at the 2007 EuroBasket. While the senior Montenegrin national basketball team's first appearance at a major FIBA event was at the 2011 EuroBasket.

=== Names ===
- Federal Republic of Yugoslavia (FR Yugoslavia) national basketball team: 1992–2003
- Serbia and Montenegro national basketball team: 2003–2006

== Competitions ==
=== Olympic Games ===
Olympic Games
| Year | Position | Pld | W | L |
|---|---|---|---|---|
| 1936 to 1988 | Part of Yugoslavia | | | |
| (Spain) 1992 | Suspended | | | |
| (United States) 1996 | 2nd place, silver medalist(s) | 8 | 7 | 1 |
| (Australia) 2000 | 6th | 7 | 4 | 3 |
| (Greece) 2004 | 11th | 6 | 2 | 4 |
In 2006, Serbia and Montenegro was split and was succeeded by Serbia and Montenegro
| Total | 3/4 | 21 | 13 | 8 |

=== FIBA World Cup ===
World Cup
| Year | Position | Pld | W | L |
|---|---|---|---|---|
| 1950 to 1990 | Part of Yugoslavia | | | |
| (Canada) 1994 | Suspended | | | |
| (Greece) 1998 | 1st place, gold medalist(s) | 9 | 8 | 1 |
| (United States) 2002 | 1st place, gold medalist(s) | 9 | 7 | 2 |
| (Japan) 2006 | 11th | 6 | 2 | 4 |
| Total | 3/4 | 24 | 17 | 7 |

=== EuroBasket ===
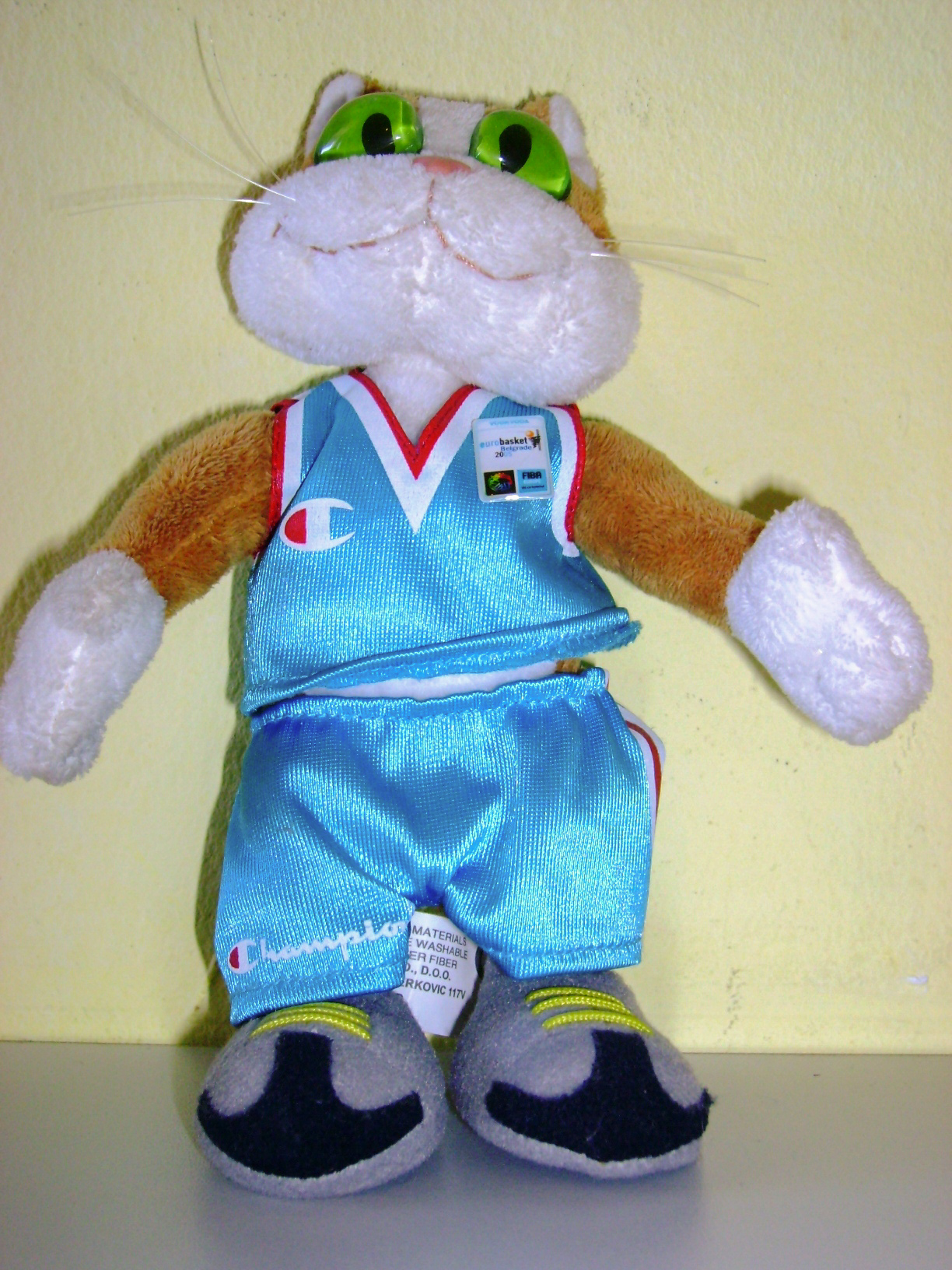
EuroBasket 2005 mascot

| EuroBasket | | | | | Qualification | | |
| Year | Position | Pld | W | L | Pld | W | L |
|---|---|---|---|---|---|---|---|
| 1935 to 1991 | Part of Yugoslavia | | | | Part of Yugoslavia | | |
| (Germany) 1993 | Suspended | | | | Suspended | | |
| (Greece) 1995 | 1st place, gold medalist(s) | 9 | 9 | 0 | 4 | 4 | 0 |
| (Spain) 1997 | 1st place, gold medalist(s) | 9 | 8 | 1 | Direct qualification | | |
| (France) 1999 | 3rd place, bronze medalist(s) | 9 | 7 | 2 | Direct qualification | | |
| (Turkey) 2001 | 1st place, gold medalist(s) | 6 | 6 | 0 | Direct qualification | | |
| (Sweden) 2003 | 6th | 7 | 3 | 4 | Direct qualification | | |
| (Serbia and Montenegro) 2005 | 9th | 4 | 2 | 2 | Qualified as host | | |
| Total | 6/7 | 44 | 35 | 9 | 4 | 4 | 0 |

== Honours ==
=== Medals table ===
| Games | Gold | Silver | Bronze | Total |
| Summer Olympics | 0 | 1 | 0 | 1 |
| FIBA World Cup | 2 | 0 | 0 | 2 |
| EuroBasket | 3 | 0 | 1 | 4 |
| Diamond Ball | 1 | 1 | 0 | 2 |
| Mediterranean Games | 0 | 0 | 1 | 1 |
| Grand Totals | 6 | 2 | 2 | 10 |

=== Individual awards ===
- FIBA World Cup MVP
  - Dejan Bodiroga – 1998
- FIBA World Cup All-Tournament Team
  - Dejan Bodiroga – 1998
  - Željko Rebrača – 1998
  - Predrag Stojaković – 2002
- EuroBasket MVP
  - Aleksandar Đorđević – 1997
  - Peja Stojaković – 2001
- EuroBasket All-Tournament Team
  - Vlade Divac – 1995
  - Aleksandar Đorđević – 1997
  - Željko Rebrača – 1997
  - Dejan Bodiroga – 1997, 1999
  - Peja Stojaković – 2001

== Rosters ==
(as FR Yugoslavia)

- 1995 EuroBasket
- 1996 Summer Olympics
- 1997 EuroBasket
- 1998 FIBA World Cup
- 1999 EuroBasket
- 2000 Summer Olympics
- 2001 EuroBasket
- 2002 FIBA World Cup

(as Serbia and Montenegro)

- 2003 EuroBasket
- 2004 Summer Olympics
- 2005 EuroBasket
- 2006 FIBA World Cup

== Head coaches ==
| Years | Name | P. | Competition |
|---|---|---|---|
| 1992–1995 | (Serbia and Montenegro) Dušan Ivković | 1st place, gold medalist(s) | 1995 EuroBasket |
| 1996–2000 | (Serbia and Montenegro) Željko Obradović | (silver) (gold) (gold) (bronze); 6th | 1996 Summer Olympics; 1997 EuroBasket; 1998 World Cup; 1999 EuroBasket; 2000 Summer Olympics |
| 2000–2002 | (Serbia and Montenegro) Svetislav Pešić | 1st place, gold medalist(s) | 2001 EuroBasket; 2002 World Cup |
| 2003 | (Serbia and Montenegro) Duško Vujošević | 6th | 2003 EuroBasket |
| 2004–2005 | (Serbia and Montenegro) Željko Obradović | 11th 9th | 2004 Summer Olympics; 2005 EuroBasket |
| 2006 | (Serbia and Montenegro) Dragan Šakota | 11th | 2006 World Cup |

== Predecessor and successor teams ==
- Yugoslavia (predecessor team)
- Serbia (continuity team)
- Montenegro (successor team)

== See also ==
- Yugoslavia national basketball team
- Serbia men's national basketball team
- Montenegro men's national basketball team
