= Marchand Continental Championship Cup =

Basketball tournament

The Jenaro "Tuto" Marchand Continental Championship Cup, or simply the Marchand Continental Cup, or Tuto Marchand Cup, is a warm-up friendly tournament for the FIBA Americas regional zone senior men's basketball championship, the FIBA Americas Championship. The tournament is often hosted by Puerto Rico. The tournament is named after Jenaro "Tuto" Marchand.

== History ==
The competition has taken place five times so far (2007, 2009, 2011, 2013, 2015), just before the FIBA Americas Championship. So far the senior men's national teams from Puerto Rico, Brazil, Canada, Dominican Republic and Argentina have competed at the tournament. Brazil has come out the winner of the tournament three times (2007, 2009, 2011), with Puerto Rico winning the 2013 edition. Canada is the current champion by winning the 2015 edition.

== 2007 Marchand Continental Championship Cup ==
Rank	National Team	GP	W–L	Points
1.	Brazil	3	2–1	5
2.	Argentina	3	2–1	5
3.	Canada	3	2–1	5
4.	Puerto Rico (Hosts)	3	0–3	3

== 2009 Marchand Continental Championship Cup ==
Rank	National Team	GP	W–L	Points
1.	Brazil	3	3–0	6
2.	Puerto Rico (Hosts)	3	2–1	5
3.	Canada	3	1–2	4
4.	Argentina	3	0–3	3

== 2011 Marchand Continental Championship Cup ==
Rank	National Team	GP	W–L	Points
1.	Brazil (Hosts)	3	3–0	6
2.	Puerto Rico	3	2–1	5
3.	Dominican Republic	3	1–2	4
4.	Canada	3	0–3	3

== 2013 Marchand Continental Championship Cup ==
Rank	National Team	GP	W–L	Points
1.	Puerto Rico (Hosts)	4	4–0	8
2.	Argentina	4	3–1	7
3.	Brazil	4	2–2	6
4.	Dominican Republic	4	1–3	5
5.	Canada	4	0–4	4

== 2015 Marchand Continental Championship Cup ==
Rank	National Team	GP	W–L	Points
1.	Canada	4	4–0	8
2.	Puerto Rico (Hosts)	3	2–1	5
3.	Argentina	3	1–2	4
4.	Brazil	3	1–2	4
5.	Dominican Republic	3	0–3	3

=== Tropical Storm Erika ===
The final day of competition at the 2015 edition was cancelled due to the weather conditions and the imminent passage of Tropical Storm Erika through Puerto Rico. This resulted in the final two games of the tournament between Dominican Republic–Brazil and Argentina–Puerto Rico to not be played. This meant the only team of the five to play all four of their games was Canada, but since they had already collected 8 points behind a 4–0 record, they already secured first place, thus resulting in Canada being named champions of the 2015 edition.
