= 2009 FIBA Stanković Continental Champions' Cup =

2009 FIBA Stanković Continental Champions Cup
5th FIBA Stanković Continental Champions Cup

Tournament details
- Host country: China
- Dates: August 28 – 31
- Teams: 4
- Venue(s): 1 (in 1 host city)

Final positions
- Champions: Australia (1st title)

Tournament statistics
- Games played: 8

The 2009 FIBA Stanković Continental Champions' Cup, or 2009 FIBA Mini World Cup, was the fifth edition of the FIBA Stanković Continental Champions' Cup tournament. It was held in Kunshan, China, from August 28 to August 31.

== Participating teams ==
- China
- Turkey
- Australia
- Angola

== Results ==
All 4 teams played a round-robin tournament first. The top 2 teams advanced to final while the other 2 teams fought for 3rd place.

=== Round-robin ===
Team	Pld	W	L	PF	PA	PD	Pts
Australia	3	3	0	216	188	+28	6
Turkey	3	2	1	195	186	+9	5
China	3	1	2	241	219	+22	4
Angola	3	0	3	159	218	-59	3

- All time UTC+8.

August 28
15:30

Turkey	54–70	Australia
Scoring by quarter: 9-27, 23-7, 11-17, 11-19
Pts: Sonkol 11; Rebs: Sonkol 7 Asts: 5 players 1		Pts: Dellavedova 13; Rebs: Dellavedova 6 Asts: Harvey 6

Kunshan Sports Center, Kunshan

August 28
19:30

China	88–62	Angola
Scoring by quarter: 29-20, 20-17, 26-9, 13-16
Pts: Wang Z.Z. 17; Rebs: 4 players 6 Asts: Sun Y. 7		Pts: M. Barros 17; Rebs: Kiala 8 Asts: M. Barros 6

Kunshan Sports Center, Kunshan

August 29
15:30

Angola	37–60	Turkey
Scoring by quarter: 5-15, 12-14, 8-16, 12-15
Pts: M. Barros 10; Rebs: Tati, P. Barros 5 Asts: M. Barros 2		Pts: Cankaya 13; Rebs: Sonkol 12; Asts: Yapar, Sevinc 3

Kunshan Sports Center, Kunshan

August 29
19:30

China	74–76	Australia
Scoring by quarter: 23-23, 20-16, 14-18, 17-19
Pts: Li X.X. 17; Rebs: Li X.X. 8 Asts: Wang Z.Z. 2		Pts: Ogilvy 18; Rebs: Forman, Martin 7 Asts: Harvey 4

Kunshan Sports Center, Kunshan

August 30
15:30

Australia	70–60	Angola
Scoring by quarter: 19-12, 10-19, 17-17, 24-12
Pts: Forman, Rush 12; Rebs: Martin, Schenscher 7 Asts: Holmes 3		Pts: Kiala 17; Rebs: Kiala 6 Asts: M. Barros 2

Kunshan Sports Center, Kunshan

August 30
19:30

China	79–81 (OT)	Turkey
Scoring by quarter: 14-16, 21-14, 16-17, 18-22, Overtime: 10-12
Pts: Zhou P. 16; Rebs: Li X.X. 10; Asts: Li X.X., Zhang Q.P., Ding J.H. 3		Pts: Cankaya 23; Rebs: Sonkol 8 Asts: Cankaya 5

Kunshan Sports Center, Kunshan

=== Third-place Playoff ===
August 31
18:30

China	58–50	Angola
Scoring by quarter: 13-12, 17-14, 16-13, 12-11
Pts: Zhou P. 20; Rebs: Li X.X. 11; Asts: Zhou P. 3		Pts: Kiala 13; Rebs: Kiala 13; Asts: Tati 2

Kunshan Sports Center, Kunshan

=== Final ===
August 31
20:30

Australia	69–52	Turkey
Scoring by quarter: 19-10, 13-13, 24-15, 13-14

Kunshan Sports Center, Kunshan

== Final standings ==
Rank	Team	Record
Gold medal	Australia	4-0
Silver medal	Turkey	2-2
Bronze medal	China	2-2
4th	Angola	0-4
