= 2010 FIBA Stanković Continental Champions' Cup =

2010 FIBA Stanković Continental Champions Cup
6th FIBA Stanković Continental Champions Cup

Tournament details
- Host country: China
- Dates: July 28 – August 1
- Teams: 4
- Venue(s): 1 (in 1 host city)

Final positions
- Champions: Slovenia (2nd title)

Tournament statistics
- Games played: 8

The 2010 FIBA Stanković Continental Champions' Cup, or 2010 FIBA Mini World Cup, officially called Dongfeng Yueda KIA Stanković Continental Cup 2010, was the 6th annual FIBA Stanković Continental Champions' Cup tournament. It was held in Liuzhou, China, from July 28 to August 1.

== Participating teams ==
- Australia
- China
- Iran
- Slovenia

== Game results ==
All 4 teams played a round-robin tournament first. The top 2 teams advanced to final while the other 2 teams fought for the 3rd place.

=== Round-robin ===
Team	Pld	W	L	PF	PA	PD	Pts
Australia	3	3	0	210	186	+24	6
Slovenia	3	2	1	245	222	+23	5
China	3	1	2	220	203	+17	4
Iran	3	0	3	197	261	-64	3

- All time UTC+8.

July 28
16:00

Slovenia	107–74	Iran
Scoring by quarter: 24–18, 34–20, 27–21, 22–15
Pts: G. Dragić 15; Rebs: Vidmar, Zupan 7 Asts: Bečirović 6		Pts: Kamrani 22; Rebs: Sahakian 5 Asts: Sahakian 2

Liuzhou Sports Center, Liuzhou

July 28
19:30

China	63–64	Australia
Scoring by quarter: 16–17, 21–11, 13–16, 13–20
Pts: Yi J.L. 17; Rebs: Yi J.L. 10; Asts: Liu W., Sun Y. 2		Pts: Mills 13; Rebs: Andersen 7 Asts: Mills, Ingles, Marković 2

Liuzhou Sports Center, Liuzhou

July 29
16:00

Australia	77–63	Slovenia
Scoring by quarter: 16–17, 24–17, 21–17, 16–12
Pts: Mills, Gibson 15; Rebs: Nielsen 7 Asts: Mills 3		Pts: Bečirović 15; Rebs: G. Dragić 6 Asts: Bečirović 3

Liuzhou Sports Center, Liuzhou

July 29
19:30

Iran	64–86	China
Scoring by quarter: 15–21, 8–22, 20–17, 21–26
Pts: Kamrani 19; Rebs: Sahakian 10; Asts: Kamrani 5		Pts: Wang S.P. 21; Rebs: Yi J.L. 10; Asts: Wang S.P. 6

Liuzhou Sports Center, Liuzhou

July 30
16:00

Australia	69–60	Iran
Scoring by quarter: 20–13, 14–13, 18–23, 17–11
Pts: Mills 16; Rebs: Andersen 7 Asts: Martin 3		Pts: Sahakian 16; Rebs: Nikkhah 7 Asts: Kamrani 4

Liuzhou Sports Center, Liuzhou

July 30
19:30

China	71–75	Slovenia
Scoring by quarter: 18–22, 23–22, 14–18, 16–13
Pts: Wang Z.Z. 17; Rebs: Liu W. 6 Asts: Liu W., Sun Y. 2		Pts: G. Dragić 15; Rebs: G. Dragić 10; Asts: G. Dragić 10

Liuzhou Sports Center, Liuzhou

=== Third-place Playoff ===
August 1
16:00

China	76–58	Iran
Scoring by quarter: 13–23, 14–14, 27–10, 22–11
Pts: Yi J.L. 18; Rebs: Yi J.L. 11; Asts: 4 players 2		Pts: Kamrani 16; Rebs: Kazemi 9 Asts: Nikkhah 3

Liuzhou Sports Center, Liuzhou

=== Final ===
August 1
19:30

Australia	60–71	Slovenia
Scoring by quarter: 16–12, 11–17, 15–20, 18-22
Pts: Ingles, Andersen 14; Rebs: Andersen 6 Asts: Martin 3		Pts: Bečirović 20; Rebs: G. Dragić 6 Asts: G. Dragić 3

Liuzhou Sports Center, Liuzhou

== Final standings ==
Rank	Team	Record
Gold medal	Slovenia	3-1
Silver medal	Australia	3-1
Bronze medal	China	2-2
4th	Iran	0-4
