= Australia men's national basketball team =

Australia
- FIBA ranking: 7 (1 September 2026)
- Joined FIBA: 1947
- FIBA zone: FIBA Asia
- National federation: Basketball Australia
- Coach: Jacob Chance
- Nickname: Boomers

Olympic Games
- Appearances: 16
- Medals: (bronze) Bronze: (2020)

FIBA World Cup
- Appearances: 13

FIBA Asia Cup
- Appearances: 3
- Medals: (gold) Gold: (2017, 2022, 2025)

FIBA Oceania Championship
- Appearances: 21
- Medals: (gold) Gold: (1971, 1975, 1978, 1979, 1981, 1983, 1985, 1987, 1989, 1991, 1993, 1995, 1997, 2003, 2005, 2007, 2011, 2013, 2015); (silver) Silver: (2001, 2009)
Home	Away

First international
- Brazil 89–66 Australia (Melbourne, Australia; 24 November 1956)

Biggest win
- Australia 136–31 Tahiti (Timaru, New Zealand; 31 August 1987)

Biggest defeat
- United States 113–73 Australia (Saitama, Japan; 27 August 2006)

The Australia men's national basketball team, nicknamed the Boomers after the slang term for an adult male kangaroo, represents Australia in international basketball competition.

Since the late 1980s, the Boomers have placed themselves among the world's elite basketball teams, making Summer Olympic Games and FIBA World Cup semi-final appearances on many occasions. Originally a member of the FIBA Oceania region, Australia nowadays competes at the FIBA Asia Cup where the Boomers were the dominant team at their first appearance. The FIBA Oceania Championship mostly consisted of a three-match competition against the other regional power, the New Zealand Tall Blacks. Before the formation of the National Basketball League (NBL) in 1979, Boomers players were selected from state leagues around the country, with Victoria, South Australia, and to a lesser extent New South Wales the dominant states. After the formation of the NBL, players began to be selected almost exclusively from that competition during the 1980s and 1990s.

Occasionally players were selected from outside the NBL. Mark Bradtke made his Boomers debut in 1987 while attending the Australian Institute of Sport (AIS) before he entered the NBL. Luc Longley made his debut in 1988 while playing college basketball in the United States. Other Australian players enter the Euroleague and the National Basketball Association (NBA) in the U.S. The Boomers's roster for the 2014 World Cup included five NBA players: Cameron Bairstow with the Chicago Bulls, Aron Baynes with the San Antonio Spurs, Matthew Dellavedova with the Cleveland Cavaliers, and Dante Exum and Joe Ingles with the Utah Jazz. Three other players who were ruled out of the World Cup due to injury also played or would later play in the NBA, namely Andrew Bogut, Ben Simmons and Patty Mills.

Several players on youth national teams are student athletes at the AIS or in the US college basketball system. Some players (e.g. Longley) made the senior national team while at US schools. By the early 21st century, almost half of the squad played outside Australia. For the 2012 London Olympic Games, only two members of the Australian squad were based in the country – Peter Crawford and Adam Gibson, with the latter being the only Australia-based member of the 2014 World Cup squad.

Australia has participated in the Olympic men's basketball tournaments 15 times. The Boomers won a bronze medal against Slovenia in the 2020 Olympic Games, making Australia the first team from outside the Americas and European regions to ever win a medal at the event. Australia has also participated in 13 FIBA World Cups without winning a medal, making Australia the nation with the second-most appearances at the tournament without winning a medal, behind Puerto Rico (15).

== History ==
=== Pre-1970s ===
Australia debuted on the international stage at the 1956 Summer Olympic Games held in Melbourne. Australia did not fare well in the competition, as they defeated only two sides (Singapore and Thailand), finishing 12th, but the event helped to popularise the game in Australia.

After not qualifying for the 1960 Summer Olympic Games in Rome, Italy, Australia returned to compete at the 1964 Tokyo Summer Olympic Games. The Australians improved on their position in Melbourne, to be ranked ninth at the completion of the games. They failed in their bid to qualify for the 1968 Summer Olympics in Mexico City.

=== 1970–80s ===
They did not play again in a major international tournament until 1970, when the team qualified for the FIBA World Championship for the first time. The team finished in 12th place, with their sole victory coming over the United Arab Republic.

At the 1972 Munich Olympic Games Lindsay Gaze made his coaching debut, after he had played at the 1964 Summer Olympics. Australia again finished ninth, but close defeats to Czechoslovakia and Spain left the team just a few baskets away from advancing to the second round. Eddie Palubinskas was the holder of the second highest scoring average of the tournament.

At the 1976 Montreal Olympic Games, Eddie Palubinskas finished as the top overall scorer, and set three Olympic scoring records, including the most points scored in a single Olympics to that time, with 269 points. The Boomers defeated Mexico, 120–117, in an overtime game, and defeated Japan, 117–79, as they moved to the second round of the tournament for the first time, on their way to an eighth-place finish.

In 1978, the Boomers headed to the Philippines for the 1978 FIBA World Championship. Australia played their most successful tournament to that time, defeating Czechoslovakia, the Dominican Republic, the Philippines (twice), and playing eventual gold medallist Yugoslavia, losing 105–101. The Boomers advanced to the semi-final round, and placed seventh.

In the 1980 Moscow Olympic Games, the Boomers played their best Olympic tournament to that date, equalling their 1976 finish of eighth place. The Boomers defeated eventual silver medallist Italy, 84–77, in the preliminary round, but due to a three-way tie with Italy and Cuba, the team failed to advance to the final round, despite 5 wins and 2 losses.

Two years later, the 1982 FIBA World Championship was held in Colombia. The Australians finished in fifth place.

The Boomers were captained at the 1984 Los Angeles Olympic Games by Phil Smyth, and introduced coach Lindsay Gaze's 19-year-old son, Andrew Gaze, to the world stage. Australia advanced to the second round, following victories over Brazil and West Germany. A loss to Italy, and a 16-point win over Egypt, left the Boomers in a must-win situation against Spain, to advance to the medal round. Spain went up big early in the first half, but the Boomers fought back, ultimately losing by a score of 101–93, ending their medal hopes with an Olympic best seventh-place finish.

Following the 1984 Olympics, Adrian Hurley took over as team coach from Lindsay Gaze.

The 1986 FIBA World Championship was a bit disappointing for Australia. Losses to Uruguay, Angola, and the Soviet Union during group play kept the Boomers from advancing, and the team finished 17th. Due to a FIBA rule allowing one naturalised player per squad at the World Championship, American born point guard Cal Bruton made his Boomers debut at the age of 32.

In 1987, the Boomers faced a home series against the Soviet Union (known as the Wang Superchallenge) and although they lost all 6 games, the team, with all players drawn from the NBL other than Australian Institute of Sport attendee, 6 ft 10 in (208 cm) centre / power forward Mark Bradtke who was making his debut for the Boomers as a 17 year old (Bradtke would make his NBL debut in 1988 with the Adelaide 36ers).

Motivated by the 1986 FIBA World Championship, Australia showed up to the 1988 Seoul Olympic Games with quite possibly its most talented roster to that date. Captained by Phil Smyth, the team included Andrew Gaze, Damian Keogh, Darryl Pearce, Ray Borner, and future Chicago Bulls triple NBA Championship winning centre, 7 ft 2 in (218 cm) Luc Longley who was attending the University of New Mexico. The Boomers breezed through the first round, losing only to gold medallist Soviet Union and silver medallist Yugoslavia. Finishing third place in their group, Australia advanced to the quarter-finals, where they defeated Spain in a closely fought game, by a score of 77–74, sending the Boomers to their first ever semi-finals. They were beaten by Yugoslavia in the semi-final, and then lost to the United States (including future Hall of Fame player David Robinson), who ended Australia's dream run with a 78–49 victory in the bronze-medal playoff. Despite the disappointing loss, the Boomers’ fourth-place finish was their best ever result at an Olympic Games (or World Championship) and solidified their status as a rising team.

=== 1990s: Gaze, Heal and Longley ===
Australia flew off to Buenos Aires for the 1990 FIBA World Championship. Led by Andrew Gaze's 24.3 points per game, fourth most in the tournament, the team defeated China, Brazil and Argentina (twice) on their way to a respectable seventh-place finish.

At the 1992 Barcelona Olympic Games, the Boomers looked to prove their fourth-place run at Seoul was no fluke. In the first Summer Olympic Games since the Soviet Union's dissolution, and the first that FIBA allowed professional basketball players to play in, Australia played to a respectable 4–4 record and sixth place. The 1992 Olympics saw the return of NBA center Luc Longley for the Boomers.

Prior to the 1992 Olympics, the Boomers played in a 3-game home series against a visiting "All-Star" team headlined by NBA and NCAA college basketball legend Kareem Abdul-Jabbar. The Boomers won the series 2–1, including attracting a then Australian basketball record 15,000 fans to the National Tennis Centre in Melbourne. The Boomers also played in the 1992 NBL All-Star Game at the AIS Arena in Canberra against the "USA Stars" (made up of import players in the NBL) which was played on 4 July and was promoted as the "Independence Day Challenge". The Boomers won the game 149–132 with Andrew Gaze scoring 43 points.

At the 1994 FIBA World Championship at Toronto, Andrew Gaze starred for the Boomers, leading the tournament with an average of 23.9 points per game. In victories over Puerto Rico, South Korea, and Cuba, Gaze scored 34, 31, and 30 points, respectively. Australia finished with a 5–3 record, and finished the tournament in fifth place. This was Phil Smyth's last World Championship appearance as a player

Smyth, the teams long-time captain and point guard would play one last time for the Boomers in March 1995 in Game 4 of a 5-game series against the touring Magic Johnson All-Stars in front of a packed house (12,000) at the Sydney Entertainment Centre. The Boomers lost in both Adelaide and Brisbane and were ultimately swept 5–0 by the All-Stars (who included former NBA stars Magic Johnson and Mark Aguirre), they pushed the visitors all the way in Game 3 at the National Tennis Centre, while Games 4 (Sydney) and 5 (Perth Entertainment Centre) went into overtime. The series however saw the Boomers without 4 of their usual starting 5 with only Andrew Vlahov who captained the side playing all 5 games. Missing for the Boomers were Andrew Gaze (playing in Greece), Shane Heal, Mark Bradtke and Luc Longley who was playing for the Chicago Bulls.

The 1996 Atlanta Olympic Games were another solid showing for Australia. Led by Andrew Gaze, and featuring Shane Heal, the team rolled through the early competition, losing only to eventual silver medallist Yugoslavia, and scoring over 100 points in every other preliminary game. In the quarterfinals, the Boomers played a hard-fought game against Croatia. The game came down to the wire, as forward Tony Ronaldson hit a 3-pointer to win the game, and advance Australia to the semi-finals. There they met the United States, who were powered by a roster of professional NBA players, and the Boomers were defeated 101–73. Lithuania would defeat Australia in the bronze medal game, and the Boomers equalled their 1988 fourth-place finish.

Just prior to the 1996 Olympics, the Boomers played the US in a warm up game. The game, played at the Delta Center in Salt Lake City, was won 118–77 by the US, though Heal topped all scorers with 28 points including hitting 8 of 12 three pointers. Heal had a running battle with NBA superstar Charles Barkley during the game with the two almost coming to blows at one point, though they hugged in mutual respect on-court after the game.

Following their exciting run at Atlanta, the Boomers showed up in Greece, for the 1998 FIBA World Championship with high hopes. Shane Heal and Andrew Gaze both finished among the top five scorers, with averages of 17.0 and 16.9 points per game, respectively; but a loss to the United States knocked Australia out of medal contention. The Boomers finished the tournament respectably with wins over Canada and Brazil, and walked away with ninth place.

=== 2000s: Sydney Olympics, Commonwealth Games and Bogut ===
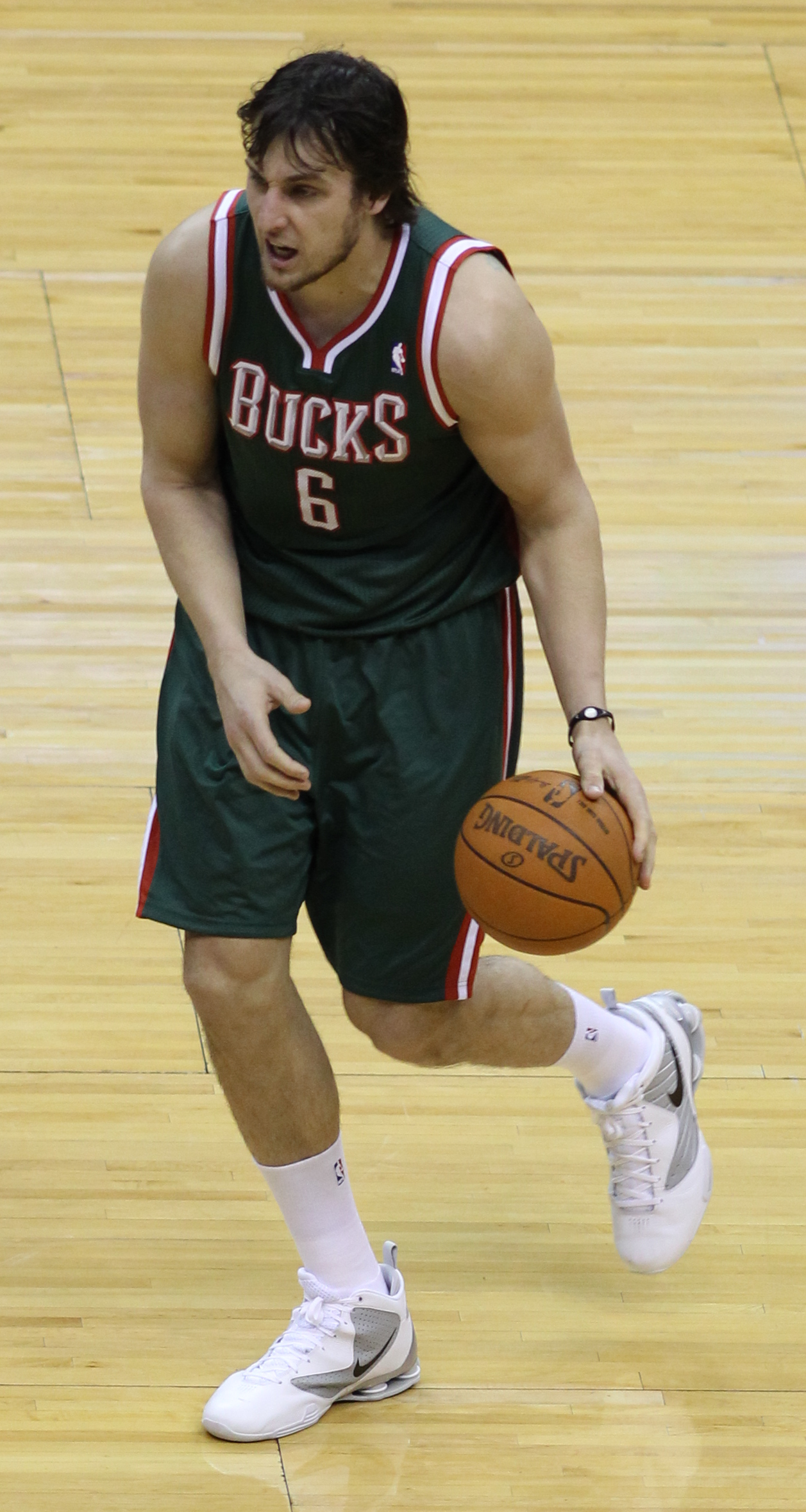
Andrew Bogut

The 2000 Summer Olympic Games projected to be an extremely exciting affair for the Boomers, as they played as host in Sydney. Despite losses in both of their first two games, Australia recovered nicely, and won their next four games over Russia, Angola, and Spain, to propel them into the quarter-finals, where they defeated Italy. But Australia's first basketball medal was not to be, as France won the semi-final match, and Lithuania captured the bronze medal game. Although their goal of medalling was not achieved, the Boomers gave the home crowd plenty to cheer about, on their way to a fourth-place finish.

After failing to qualify for the 2002 FIBA World Championship, the Boomers came into the 2004 Athens Olympic Games hungry for victory. Captained by Shane Heal, and featuring future NBA Draft first pick Andrew Bogut in his international debut, Australia fought hard on their way to a ninth-place finish.

In early 2006, Australia entered the first ever Commonwealth Games basketball competition in their home city of Melbourne and went through the tournament undefeated to claim the gold medal. Later in 2006 at the FIBA World Championship in Japan, Australia was led in scoring by Andrew Bogut, C.J. Bruton, and Jason Smith. Despite their efforts, the Boomers failed to qualify for the playoff rounds, and finished tied for ninth place.

The Boomers entered the 2008 Beijing Olympic Games with one of their more talented rosters to date, which included Andrew Bogut, C.J. Bruton, Captain Matthew Nielsen, and Patty Mills, in his international debut. Despite his youth, Mills had a hot hand, scoring over 20 points on several occasions, and leading the team with an average of 14.2 points per game. Australia made the quarter-finals, but gold medallists United States put the Boomers away late in the game, ending their run with a seventh-place finish.

=== 2010s: Additional NBA players ===
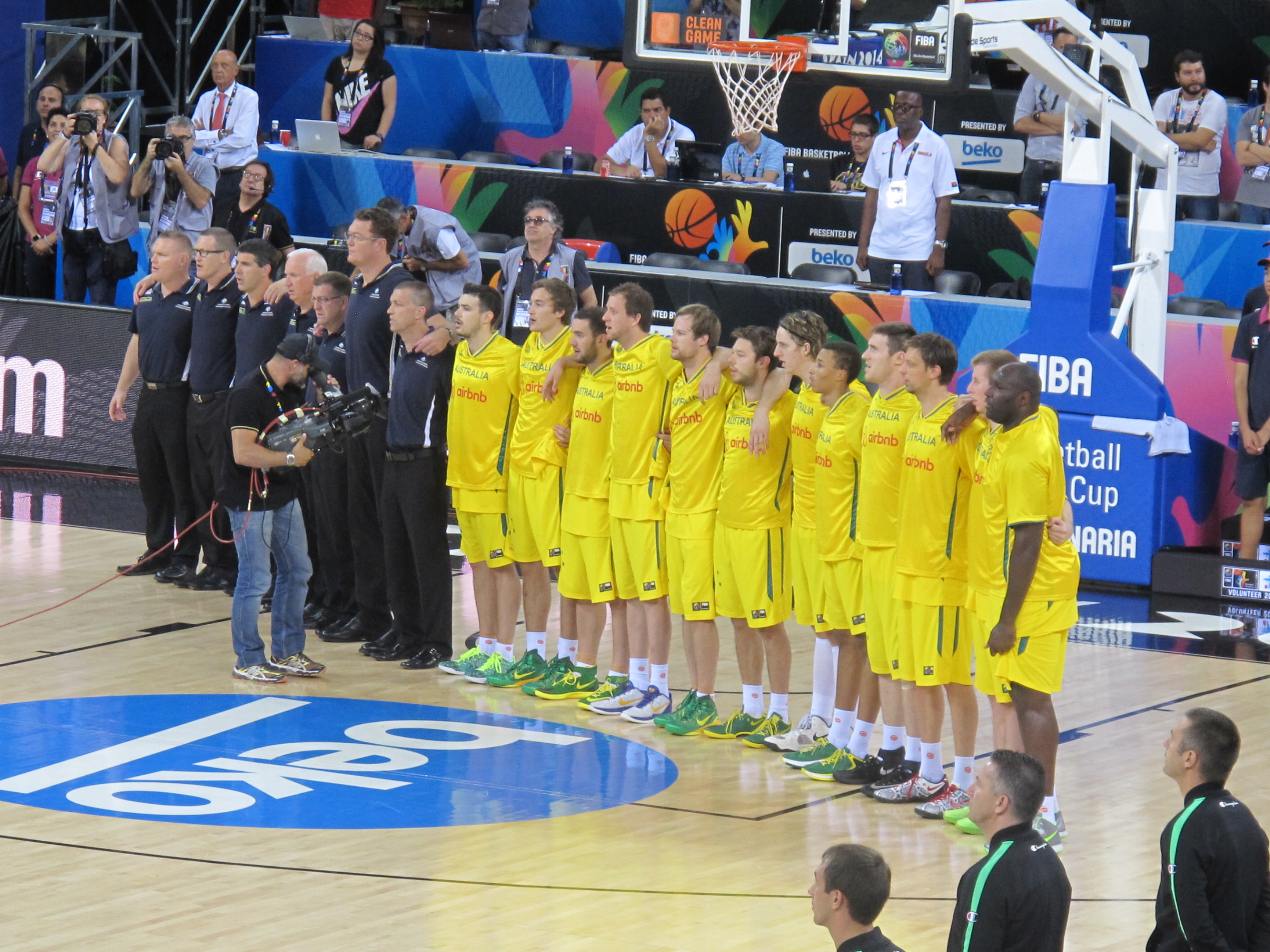
Team Australia at the 2014 FIBA World Cup before beating Lithuania 82–75.

The Boomers qualified for the 2010 FIBA World Championship in Turkey and placed 10th overall. In 2011, Melbourne-born number one NBA draft pick Kyrie Irving considered declaring his international allegiance to Australia in order to compete in the 2012 Olympics, but eventually opted to wait for international selection for the United States.

Despite Irving declining the offer to represent his country of birth, the Boomers entered the 2012 London Olympic Games with arguably their most talented roster since 2000, though they were missing their star centre Andrew Bogut, who was out with a broken ankle. Australia made the quarter-finals with a 3–2 win–loss record, but gold medallists United States put the Boomers away late in the game, ending their run with a seventh-place finish again.

Following the London Olympics, Brett Brown announced his decision to step down as Boomers head coach, citing his desire to spend more time with his family in the United States. As of December 2012, Basketball Australia was yet to announce his replacement, although one of his assistants, dual National Basketball League championship winning coach with the New Zealand Breakers, Andrej Lemanis, was one of the favourites to win the job.

On 24 April 2013, Lemanis was announced as the new head coach of the Boomers.

By winning the 2013 FIBA Oceania Championship, Australia qualified for the 2014 FIBA Basketball World Cup in Spain. Australia was drawn into Group D, alongside Lithuania, Slovenia, Angola, Mexico, and South Korea. After suffering an opening round 90–80 loss to Slovenia, Australia bounced back, stringing together three consecutive wins over South Korea, Lithuania and Mexico, the first time in 16 years that Australia had won 3 consecutive matches at the FIBA World Cup. However, in their next match Australia suffered a 91–83 loss to Angola, which came despite leading by 15 points in the middle of the third quarter. This result, combined with Lithuania's 67–64 win over Slovenia, meant that Australia finished third in their group, qualifying for the knockout stage of the tournament.

Australia's top-five NBA draft picks

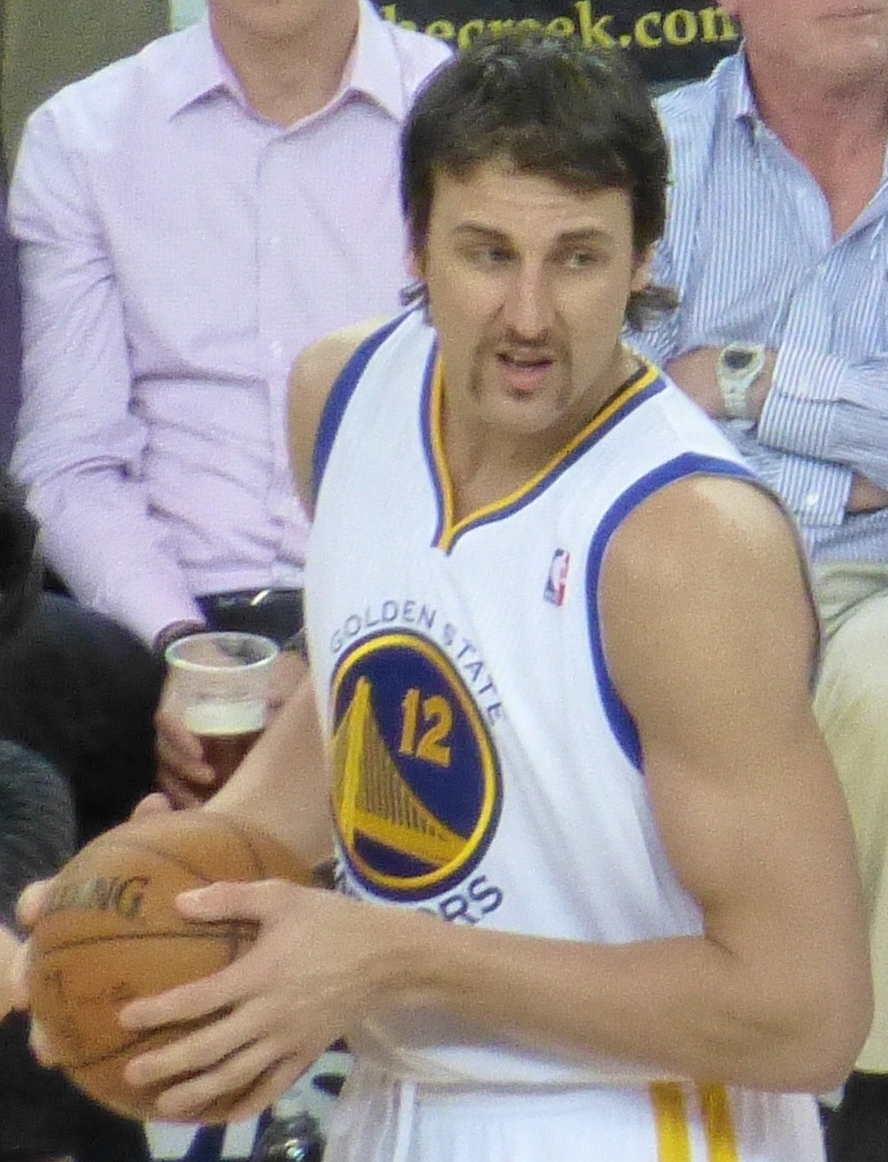
Andrew Bogut

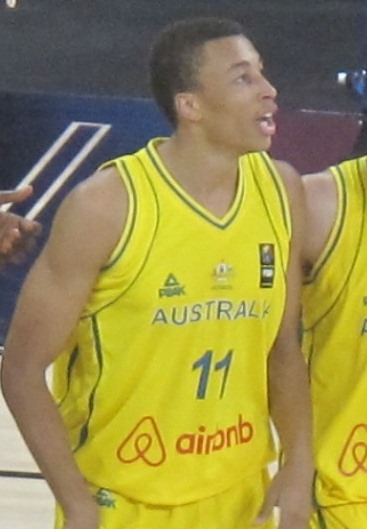
Dante Exum

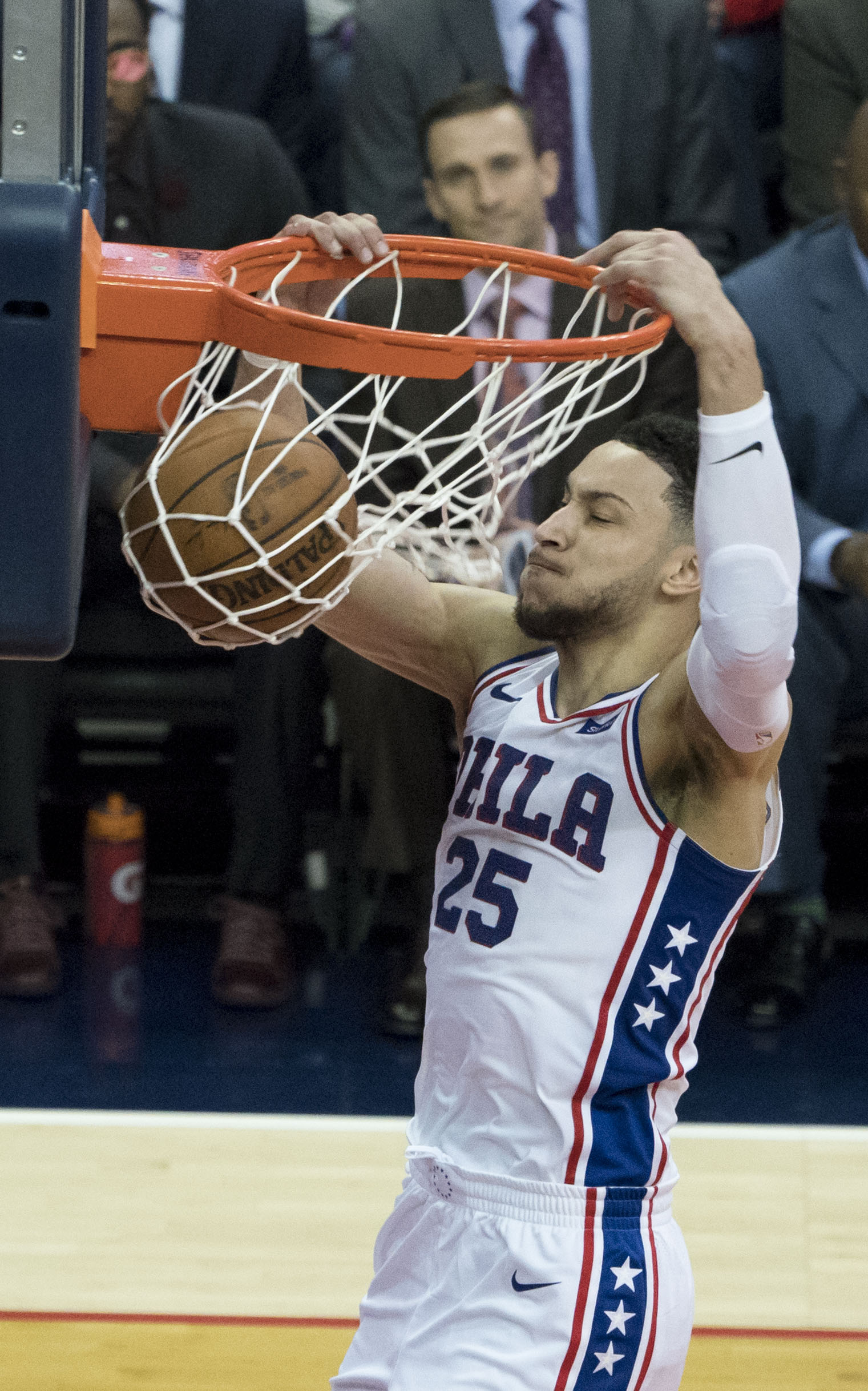
Ben Simmons

Because Australia would finish third by losing, and that finishing third would benefit Australia more than finishing second, combined with the absences of fit key players Aron Baynes and Joe Ingles led to allegations that Australia deliberately lost their game against Angola in order to finish third in their group, and as a result, avoid the United States until the semi-finals, with Slovenian basketballer Goran Dragić posting "Basketball is a beautiful sport, there is no room for fixing the game like today Australia vs Angola!! @FIBA should do something about that!" on Twitter. However, these claims were denied by Boomers coach Andrej Lemanis. On 26 November 2014, Australia was cleared of tanking by FIBA.

Australia met World No. 7 Turkey in the knockout stage of the tournament. Australia suffered a 65–64 loss to Turkey, ending their World Cup campaign, meaning that for the 11th World Cup, Australia would return home empty handed.

Leading into the 2016 Rio Olympics, Australia saw a surge in locals being drafted into the NBA. Along with former number 1 NBA draft pick Andrew Bogut, Dante Exum was taken with the fifth pick in the 2014 NBA draft and Ben Simmons was selected with the first pick in the 2016 NBA draft, adding to already established Australian NBA players in Patty Mills, Matthew Dellavedova, Joe Ingles and Aron Baynes. Forward Thon Maker was also drafted with the 10th pick in the 2016 NBA draft. Despite Exum, Maker and Simmons electing not to compete in the 2016 Olympics, the Australians equaled their best ever performance by reaching the semifinals and losing their bronze medal playoff with Spain by one point.

==== 2017: Move into Asian basketball ====
In August 2015, FIBA announced Australia would be joining the Asian basketball zone for future tournaments, starting with the 2017 FIBA Asia Cup. The Boomers were victorious in their inaugural Asia Cup appearance and turned their attention to 2019 FIBA World Cup qualifiers against Asian opposition. In July 2018, during the 3rd quarter of their game against the Philippines for the 2019 FIBA Basketball World Cup qualification (Asia), After being played rough by Chris Goulding throughout the game, the Gilas' Roger Pogoy retaliated. Daniel Kickert struck back with his elbow, sparking a full-scale brawl involving players and staff from both sides. Suspensions and fines were handed off to those involved including players from both teams, Filipino coaches and the referees for failing to control the game. After qualifying for the 2019 FIBA World Cup, Australia reached the semi-finals for the first time and finished the tournament in fourth place.

=== 2020s: Olympic breakthrough and more NBA players ===
At the Tokyo 2020 Olympics, led by veterans Patty Mills and Joe Ingles, the Boomers managed to claim their first ever international medal, defeating a Luka Dončić led Slovenia, 107–93. Mills would score 42 points in the decisive match. The Boomers went through the group stage undefeated, and Mills would be named to the tournament All-Star 5. Additional Australian players were drafted into the NBA with first round draft picks including 2019 #20 pick Matisse Thybulle, 2020 #18 pick Josh Green, 2021 #6 pick Josh Giddey and 2022 #8 pick Dyson Daniels.

== Competitive record ==
A red box around the year indicates tournaments played within Australia

=== Olympic Games ===
Summer Olympic Games record
Year	Round	Position	Pld	W	L
(Germany) 1936	Did not participate				
(United Kingdom) 1948	Did not participate				
(Finland) 1952	Did not participate				
(Australia) 1956	Playoff	12th	7	2	5
(Italy) 1960	Did not participate				
(Japan) 1964	Playoff	9th	9	4	5
(Mexico) 1968	Did not participate				
(Germany) 1972	Playoff	9th	9	5	4
(Canada) 1976	Quarter-finals	8th	7	2	5
(Soviet Union) 1980	Quarter-finals	8th	7	5	2
(United States) 1984	Quarter-finals	7th	8	4	4
(South Korea) 1988	Semi-finals	4th	8	4	4
(Spain) 1992	Quarter-finals	6th	8	4	4
(United States) 1996	Semi-finals	4th	8	5	3
(Australia) 2000	Semi-finals	4th	8	4	4
(Greece) 2004	Playoff	9th	6	2	4
(China) 2008	Quarter-finals	7th	6	3	3
(United Kingdom) 2012	Quarter-finals	7th	6	3	3
(Brazil) 2016	Semi-finals	4th	8	5	3
(Japan) 2020	Semi-finals	3rd	6	5	1
(France) 2024	Quarter-finals	6th	4	1	3
(United States) 2028	To be determined				
(Australia) 2032	Qualified as host				
Total	0 Titles	17/23	115	58	57

=== FIBA World Cup ===
NB: This competition was known as the FIBA World Championship through the 2010 edition.

FIBA World Cup record
Year	Round	Position	Pld	W	L
(Argentina) 1950	Did not participate				
(Brazil) 1954	Did not participate				
(Chile) 1959	Did not participate				
(Brazil) 1963	Did not participate				
(Uruguay) 1967	Did not participate				
(Socialist Federal Republic of Yugoslavia) 1970	Playoff	12th	8	1	7
(Puerto Rico) 1974	Playoff	12th	7	2	5
(Philippines) 1978	Quarter-finals	7th	10	4	6
(Colombia) 1982	Quarter-finals	5th	8	4	4
(Spain) 1986	Playoff	17th	5	2	3
(Argentina) 1990	Quarter-finals	7th	8	4	4
(Canada) 1994	Quarter-finals	5th	8	5	3
(Greece) 1998	Playoff	9th	8	5	3
(United States) 2002	Did not qualify				
(Japan) 2006	Playoff	13th	6	2	4
(Turkey) 2010	Playoff	10th	6	3	3
(Spain) 2014	Round of 16	12th	6	3	3
(China) 2019	Semi-finals	4th	8	6	2
(Philippines) (Japan) (Indonesia) 2023	Second round	10th	5	3	2
(Qatar) 2027	To be determined				
(France) 2031	To be determined				
Total	0 Titles	13/20	93	44	49

=== FIBA Asia Cup ===
Year	Round	Position	Pld	W	L
1960–2015	Not a FIBA Asia member				
(Lebanon) 2017	Champions	1st	6	6	0
(Indonesia) 2022	Champions	1st	6	6	0
(Saudi Arabia) 2025	Champions	1st	6	6	0
Total	3 Titles	3/3	18	18	0

=== FIBA Oceania Championship ===
FIBA Oceania Championship record
Year	Round	Position	Pld	W	L
(New Zealand) 1971	Champions	1st	3	3	0
(Australia) 1975	Champions	1st	3	3	0
(New Zealand) 1978	Champions	1st	3	2	1
(Australia) 1979	Champions	1st	3	3	0
(New Zealand) 1981	Champions	1st	2	2	0
(New Zealand) 1983	Champions	1st	2	2	0
(Australia) 1985	Champions	1st	3	3	0
(New Zealand) 1987	Champions	1st	3	3	0
(Australia) 1989	Champions	1st	2	2	0
(New Zealand) 1991	Champions	1st	2	2	0
(New Zealand) 1993	Champions	1st	3	3	0
(Australia) 1995	Champions	1st	3	3	0
(New Zealand) 1997	Champions	1st	3	3	0
(New Zealand) 1999	Did not participate				
(New Zealand) 2001	Runner-up	2nd	3	1	2
(Australia) 2003	Champions	1st	3	3	0
(New Zealand) 2005	Champions	1st	3	3	0
(Australia) 2007	Champions	1st	3	2	1
(Australia) (New Zealand) 2009	Runner-up	2nd	2	1	1
(Australia) 2011	Champions	1st	3	3	0
(New Zealand) (Australia) 2013	Champions	1st	2	2	0
(Australia) (New Zealand) 2015	Champions	1st	2	2	0
Total	19 Titles	21/22	56	51	5

=== FIBA Diamond Ball ===
FIBA Diamond Ball record
Year	Round	Position	Pld	W	L
(Hong Kong) 2000	Champions	1st	3	3	0
(Serbia and Montenegro) 2004	Playoff	5th	3	1	2
(China) 2008	Runner-up	2nd	3	2	1
Total	1 Title	3/3	9	6	3

=== FIBA Stanković Cup ===
FIBA Stanković Cup record
Year	Round	Position	Pld	W	L
(China) 2005	Third place	3rd	5	3	2
(China) 2006	Playoff	6th	3	0	3
(China) 2007	Did not participate				
(China) 2008	Did not participate				
(China) 2009	Champions	1st	4	4	0
(China) 2010	Runner-up	2nd	4	3	1
(China) 2011	Runner-up	2nd	4	2	2
(China) 2012	Runner-up	2nd	4	1	3
Total	1 Title	5/7	20	12	8

=== Commonwealth Games ===
Commonwealth Games record
Year	Round	Position	Pld	W	L
(Australia) 2006	Champions	1st	5	5	0
(Australia) 2018	Champions	1st	5	5	0
Total	2 Titles	2/2	10	10	0

=== General results ===
- Australia men's national basketball team 2011–12 results
- Australia men's national basketball team 2012–13 results
- Australia men's national basketball team 2013–14 results
- Australia men's national basketball team 2014–15 results

== Team ==
=== Current roster ===
Roster for the 2027 FIBA Basketball World Cup Qualification

Australia Men's National Basketball Team – 2027 FIBA World Cup Qualification - Group E roster
Players
Coaches

Pos.	No.	Name	Age – Date of birth	Height	Club	Ctr.
F	3	Maxwell MacKinnon	22 – 9 October 2003	1.98 m (6 ft 6 in)	Brisbane Bullets	(Australia)
G	4	Dash Daniels	18 – 18 December 2007	1.95 m (6 ft 5 in)	South East Melbourne Phoenix	(Australia)
G	5	Angus Glover	27 – 8 September 1998	1.94 m (6 ft 4 in)	South East Melbourne Phoenix	(Australia)
G	7	Tom Wilson	29 – 24 June 1997	1.94 m (6 ft 4 in)	Melbourne United	(Australia)
PF	12	Josh Bannan	25 – 26 February 2001	2.08 m (6 ft 10 in)	Pallacanestro Trieste	(Italy)
C	13	Sam Froling	26 – 10 February 2000	2.12 m (6 ft 11 in)	Illawarra Hawks	(Australia)
PF	15	Nick Kay	34 – 13 August 1992	2.06 m (6 ft 9 in)	Shimane Susanoo Magic	(Japan)
G	17	Tanner Krebs	30 – 4 January 1996	1.98 m (6 ft 6 in)	Melbourne United	(Australia)
G	21	Jacob Holt	23 – 21 June 2003	2.08 m (6 ft 10 in)	Skyliners Frankfurt	(Germany)
F	23	Luke Jacob Travers	24 – 3 September 2001	2.00 m (6 ft 7 in)	Melbourne United	(Australia)
F	30	Anthony Dell'Orso	23 – 24 July 2003	1.97 m (6 ft 6 in)	Perth Wildcats	(Australia)
G	40	Elijah Pepper	25 – 8 May 2001	1.93 m (6 ft 4 in)	Perth Wildcats	(Australia)

Head coach

- (Australia) Jacob Chance

Assistant coach(es)

- (Australia) John Peter Rillie
- (Australia) Gerard John Martin

Legend

- (C) Team captain
- Club – describes last
  club before the tournament
- Age – describes age
  on 5 August 2025

=== Notable players ===
- David Andersen
- Chris Anstey
- Daniel Kickert
- Aron Baynes
- David Barlow
- Andris Blicavs
- Andrew Bogut
- Jonah Bolden
- Ray Borner
- Mark Bradtke
- Ryan Broekhoff
- C.J. Bruton
- Martin Cattalini
- Matthew Dellavedova
- Mark Dalton
- Brad Dalton
- Ian Davies
- John Dorge
- Frank Drmic
- Dante Exum
- Andrew Gaze
- Lindsay Gaze
- Adam Gibson
- Brian Goorjian
- Ricky Grace
- Josh Green
- Scott Fisher
- Shane Heal
- Adrian Hurley
- Joe Ingles
- Damian Keogh
- Leroy Loggins
- Luc Longley
- Brett Maher
- Thon Maker
- Aleks Marić
- Damian Martin
- Mangok Mathiang
- Mike McKay
- Sam Mackinnon
- Patrick Mills
- Danny Morseu
- Brad Newley
- Matthew Nielsen
- Eddie Palubinskas
- Darryl Pearce
- John Rillie
- Paul Rogers
- Tony Ronaldson
- Glen Saville
- Luke Schenscher
- Larry Sengstock
- Ben Simmons
- Jason Smith
- Phil Smyth
- Matisse Thybulle
- Andrew Vlahov
- Bill Wyatt

=== Head coach position ===
- (Australia) Lindsay Gaze – 1972–1984
- (Australia) Adrian Hurley – 1985–1993
- (Australia) Lindsay Gaze – 1994
- (Australia) Barry Barnes – 1995–2000
- (Australia) Phil Smyth – 2001
- (United States) Brian Goorjian – 2001–2008
- (United States) Brett Brown – 2009–2012
- (Australia) Andrej Lemanis – 2013–2019
- (United States) Brett Brown – 2019–2020 (did not lead the team in a game or a camp during second stint due to COVID-19 pandemic)
- (United States) Brian Goorjian – 2020–2024
- (Australia) Adam Caporn – 2025–present

== See also ==
- Australian International Player of the Year
- Al Ramsay Shield
- Australia women's national basketball team
- Australia men's national wheelchair basketball team
- Australia men's national under-19 basketball team
- Australia men's national under-17 basketball team
