= 2009 FIBA Oceania Championship squads =

These are the rosters of the two teams who competed for the 2009 FIBA Oceania Championship.

== Australia ==
Head coach: (United States) Brett Brown

| # | Pos | Name | Club | Date of birth | Height |
|---|---|---|---|---|---|
| 4 | SG | Matthew Dellavedova | (United States) Saint Mary's College of California | September 8, 1990 (age 19) | 193 |
| 5 | PG | Adam Gibson | (Australia) Gold Coast Blaze | October 30, 1986 (age 22) | 188 |
| 6 | C | Andrew Ogilvy | (United States) Vanderbilt University | June 17, 1988 (age 21) | 211 |
| 7 | SG | Joe Ingles | (Spain) CB Granada | October 2, 1987 (age 21) | 203 |
| 8 | SG | Brad Newley | (Turkey) Beşiktaş Cola Turka | February 18, 1985 (age 24) | 201 |
| 9 | SG | Peter Crawford | (Australia) Townsville Crocodiles | November 6, 1979 (age 29) | 193 |
| 10 | SG | James Harvey | (Australia) Gold Coast Blaze | February 15, 1979 (age 30) | 196 |
| 11 | PF | Mark Worthington | (Australia) Melbourne Tigers | June 8, 1983 (age 26) | 202 |
| 12 | PF | Oscar Forman | New Zealand Breakers | January 16, 1982 (age 27) | 205 |
| 13 | PF | Aron Baynes | (Lithuania) Lietuvos Rytas | December 9, 1986 (age 22) | 208 |
| 14 | PG | Damian Martin | (Australia) Perth Wildcats | September 5, 1984 (age 24) | 188 |
| 15 | PF | Nathan Jawai | (United States) Dallas Mavericks | October 10, 1986 (age 22) | 208 |

== New Zealand ==
Head coach: (Serbia) Nenad Vucinic

| # | Pos | Name | Club | Date of birth | Height |
|---|---|---|---|---|---|
| 4 | PG | Lindsay Tait | (New Zealand) Wellington Saints | January 8, 1982 (age 27) | 192 |
| 5 | PG | Michael Fitchett | (New Zealand) Waikato Pistons | September 20, 1982 (age 26) | 186 |
| 6 | SG | Kirk Penney | New Zealand Breakers | November 23, 1980 (age 28) | 196 |
| 7 | PF | Mika Vukona | (Australia) New Zealand Breakers | May 13, 1982 (age 27) | 198 |
| 8 | PG | Jarrod Kenny | (New Zealand) Hawke's Bay Hawks | September 17, 1985 (age 23) | 187 |
| 9 | SG | Corey Webster | New Zealand Breakers | November 29, 1988 (age 20) | 185 |
| 10 | SF | Leon Henry | (New Zealand) Wellington Saints | October 14, 1985 (age 23) | 200 |
| 11 | C | Alex Pledger | (United States) Belmont Abbey College | March 27, 1987 (age 22) | 213 |
| 12 | SF | Thomas Abercrombie | New Zealand Breakers | July 5, 1987 (age 22) | 198 |
| 13 | PF | Casey Frank | (New Zealand) Auckland Stars | October 23, 1977 (age 31) | 203 |
| 14 | C | Robert Loe | (New Zealand) Westlake Boys High School | August 5, 1991 (age 18) | 211 |
| 15 | PF | Benny Anthony | (New Zealand) North Harbour Heat | July 20, 1988 (age 21) | 198 |
