= James Harvey (basketball) =

Australian basketball player

Personal information
- Born: 15 February 1979 (age 47) Perth, Western Australia, Australia
- Listed height: 6 ft 5 in (1.96 m)
- Listed weight: 200 lb (91 kg)

Career information
- Playing career: 1998–2014
- Position: Shooting guard / small forward

Career history
- 1996–1997: Cockburn Cougars
- 1998–1999: Perry Lakes Hawks
- 1998–2004: Perth Wildcats
- 2000: Willetton Tigers
- 2004: Maccabi Rishon LeZion
- 2005: Perth Redbacks
- 2005–2007: West Sydney Razorbacks
- 2007–2012: Gold Coast Blaze
- 2012–2014: Sydney Kings

Career highlights
- NBL champion (2000); Stanković Cup MVP (2009); All-NBL Second Team (2008); All-NBL Third Team (2009); NBL Most Improved Player (2001); SBL Rookie of the Year (1997)

James Harvey (born 15 February 1979) is an Australian former professional basketball player who played 15 seasons in the National Basketball League (NBL).

== Basketball career ==
Born and raised in Perth, Harvey began playing for the Cockburn Cougars of the State Basketball League (SBL) in 1996 and won the league's Rookie of the Year award the following year. After another successful year in the SBL with the Perry Lakes Hawks in 1998, Harvey signed with the Perth Wildcats for the 1998–99 NBL season and continued playing for the Wildcats until 2004. He was part of Perth's 1999–2000 NBL championship and 2002–03 grand final appearance, and won the league's Most Improved Player award in 2001. Harvey also continued to play in the SBL with Perry Lakes in 1999, and with the Willetton Tigers in 2000, leading the league in scoring that year with 518 total points. In 97 games over five SBL seasons, Harvey averaged 22.8 points per game.

Following the conclusion of the 2003–04 NBL season, Harvey ventured to Israel where he played one game for Maccabi Rishon LeZion. In July 2004, he played in the Treviso Summer League. He later re-signed with Maccabi for the 2004–05 season, but managed just five games for the club before departing Israel in November 2004.

In 2005, after a short stint with the Perth Redbacks, Harvey signed with the West Sydney Razorbacks, where he spent two seasons playing alongside Scott McGregor for head coach Mark Watkins.

In May 2007, Harvey was the first signing and inaugural captain of the newly established Gold Coast Blaze. In his first season with the Blaze, Harvey averaged 21.4 points per game which was top ten in the league, finished second in three-point percentage (45%) and led the club to the playoffs in their debut season. He was subsequently named to the All-NBL second team in 2007–08 and 2008–09.

On 15 May 2012, Harvey signed a two-year deal with the Sydney Kings. During his time with the Kings, he was the team's co-captain.

On 4 February 2013, Harvey was named in the Perth Wildcats 30th Anniversary All-Star team.

== Post-playing career ==
Harvey joined the Fox Sports NBL commentary team for the 2015–16 season.

== National team career ==
Harvey was a regular representative of the Australian Boomers, as he captained them to a historic Stanković Cup win in 2009, and was named tournament MVP and earned All-Star five honours.
