= 2017 FIBA Stanković Continental Champions' Cup =

2017 FIBA Stanković Continental Champions Cup
15th FIBA Stanković Continental Champions Cup

Tournament details
- Host country: China
- Dates: June 19 – July 23
- Teams: 4
- Venue(s): 1 (in 1 host city)

Final positions
- Champions: Germany (1st title)

Tournament statistics
- Games played: 8

The 2017 FIBA Stanković Continental Champions' Cup, or 2017 FIBA Mini World Cup, officially called Dongfeng Yueda KIA FIBA Stanković Continental Champions' Cup 2017, was the 15th annual FIBA Stanković Continental Champions' Cup tournament. It was held in Shenzhen, from July 19 to July 23, 2017.

== Participating teams ==
- China Red
- Croatia
- Egypt
- Germany B

== Round-robin results ==
=== Team standings ===
Pos	Team	Pld	W	L	PF	PA	PD	Pts	Qualification
1	Croatia	3	3	0	256	212	+44	6	Advanced to the finals
2	Germany B	3	2	1	236	225	+11	5	Advanced to the finals
3	China Red (H)	3	1	2	215	227	−12	4	Qualified for third-place playoff
4	Egypt	3	0	3	203	246	−43	3	Qualified for third-place playoff

Rules for classification: 1) Points; 2) Goal difference; 3) Number of goals scored;
(H) Hosts

=== Day 1 ===
19 July 2017

Germany B	83–69	Egypt

Shenzhen

19 July 2017

Report

China Red	71–81	Croatia

Shenzhen

=== Day 2 ===
20 July 2017

Croatia	83–77	Germany B

Shenzhen

20 July 2017

China Red	71–70	Egypt

Shenzhen

=== Day 3 ===
21 July 2017

Croatia	92–64	Egypt

Shenzhen

21 July 2017

China Red	73–76	Germany B

Shenzhen

== Final round ==
=== Third-place playoff ===
23 July 2017

China Red	90–64	Egypt

Shenzhen

=== Final ===
23 July 2017

Croatia	65–69	Germany B

Shenzhen

== Final standings ==
Rank	Team	Record
Gold medal	Germany B	3–1
Silver medal	Croatia	3–1
Bronze medal	China Red	2–2
4th	Egypt	0–4
