= 2006 FIBA Stanković Continental Champions' Cup =

2006 FIBA Stanković Continental Champions Cup
2nd FIBA Stanković Continental Champions Cup

Tournament details
- Host country: China
- Dates: August 11 – 15
- Teams: 6
- Venue(s): 2 (in 2 host cities)

Final positions
- Champions: Greece (1st title)

Tournament statistics
- Games played: 9
- MVP: (Germany) Dirk Nowitzki
- Top scorer: (Brazil) Leandro Barbosa (21.0 PPG)
- Top rebounds: (Germany) Dirk Nowitzki (11.0 RPG) (China) Yi Jianlian (11.0 RPG)
- Top assists: (Australia) Sam Mackinnon (4.0 APG)
- PPG (Team): Brazil (79.0 PPG)
- RPG (Team): France (37.0 RPG)
- APG (Team): China (15.3 APG)

The 2006 FIBA Stanković Continental Champions' Cup, or 2006 FIBA Stanković World Cup, was the second edition of the FIBA Stanković Continental Champions' Cup tournament. It was held in Nanjing and Kunshan, The People's Republic of China, from August 11 to 15.

== Participating teams ==
- Australia (FIBA Oceania Champion)
- Brazil (FIBA Americas Champion)
- China (FIBA Asia Champion)
- France (FIBA Europe 2nd runner-up)
- Germany (FIBA Europe 1st runner-up)
- Greece (FIBA Europe Champion)

Teams were divided into 2 groups.

== Results ==
=== Group A ===
11 Aug – Greece – Australia 68:60

12 Aug – France – Greece 72:68

13 Aug – Australia – France 77:71

A1 – Greece

A2 – France

A3 – Australia

=== Group B ===
11 Aug – Germany – China 82:73

12 Aug – Germany – Brazil 76:75

13 Aug – Brazil – China 88:78

B1 – Germany

B2 – Brazil

B3 – China

=== Final round ===
15 Aug (A3-B3) Australia – China 61:63

15 Aug (A2-B2) France – Brazil 86:74

15 Aug (A1-B1) Greece – Germany 84:47

== Final standings ==
Greece

Germany

France

4th Brazil

5th China

6th Australia

== Individual awards ==
=== All-Tournament Team ===
- Tony Parker ( France)
- Leandro Barbosa ( Brazil)
- Dirk Nowitzki ( Germany)
- Anderson Varejão ( Brazil)
- Yao Ming ( China)

=== Top Scorer ===
- Leandro Barbosa ( Brazil)

=== MVP ===
- Dirk Nowitzki ( Germany)
