= Australia men's national basketball team 2014–15 results =

== 2014 Sino-Australia Challenge ==
ABC2

29 May 2014

Australia 97, China 95 (OT)

Challenge Stadium, Perth, Australia

ABC2

31 May 2014

Australia 85, China 64

Challenge Stadium, Perth, Australia

ABC2

6 June 2014

China 95, Australia 80

Jiangsu Zhenjiang Sports and Exhibition Centre, Zhenjiang, China

ABC2

8 June 2014

China 95, Australia 90

Tianmuhu Arena, Liyang, China

Australia win series 2-2; 352-349 on points differential

== Friendly ==
SportoTV

8 August 2014

Australia 100, Finland 95

Švyturys Arena, Klaipėda, Lithuania

SportoTV

9 August 2014

Australia 75, Ukraine 60

Švyturys Arena, Klaipėda, Lithuania

SportoTV

11 August 2014

Lithuania 91, Australia 78

Švyturys Arena, Klaipėda, Lithuania

.

12 August 2014

Finland 87, Australia 81 (OT)

Helsinki Ice Hall, Helsinki, Finland

== Bleu Blanc Tour 2014 Antibes ==
ESPN2

15 August 2014

Australia 74, Ukraine 65

Azur Arena, Antibes, France

ESPN

16 August 2014

Australia 97, Philippines 75

Azur Arena, Antibes, France

ESPN2

17 August 2014

France 74, Australia 76

Azur Arena, Antibes, France

== Bleu Blanc Tour 2014 Strasbourg ==
.

22 August 2014

Australia 80, Finland 57

Rhénus Sport, Strasbourg, France

ESPN2

24 August 2014

France 73, Australia 50

Rhénus Sport, Strasbourg, France

== 2014 FIBA World Cup ==
=== Preliminary round ===
==== Group D ====
ABC2

30 August 2014

Australia 80, Slovenia 90

Gran Canaria Arena, Las Palmas, Spain
Attendance: 5,900

ABC2

31 August 2014

Australia 89, South Korea 55

Gran Canaria Arena, Las Palmas, Spain
Attendance: 5,524

ABC2

2 September 2014

Australia 82, Lithuania 75

Gran Canaria Arena, Las Palmas, Spain
Attendance: 5,657

ABC2

3 September 2014

Australia 70, Mexico 62

Gran Canaria Arena, Las Palmas, Spain
Attendance: 5,494

ABC2

4 September 2014

Angola 91, Australia 83

Gran Canaria Arena, Las Palmas, Spain
Attendance: 5,647

=== Final round ===
==== Round of 16 ====
ABC2

7 September 2014

Australia 64, Turkey 65

Palau Sant Jordi, Barcelona, Spain
Attendance: 6,339
