= Goran Dragić =

Slovenian basketball player (born 1986)

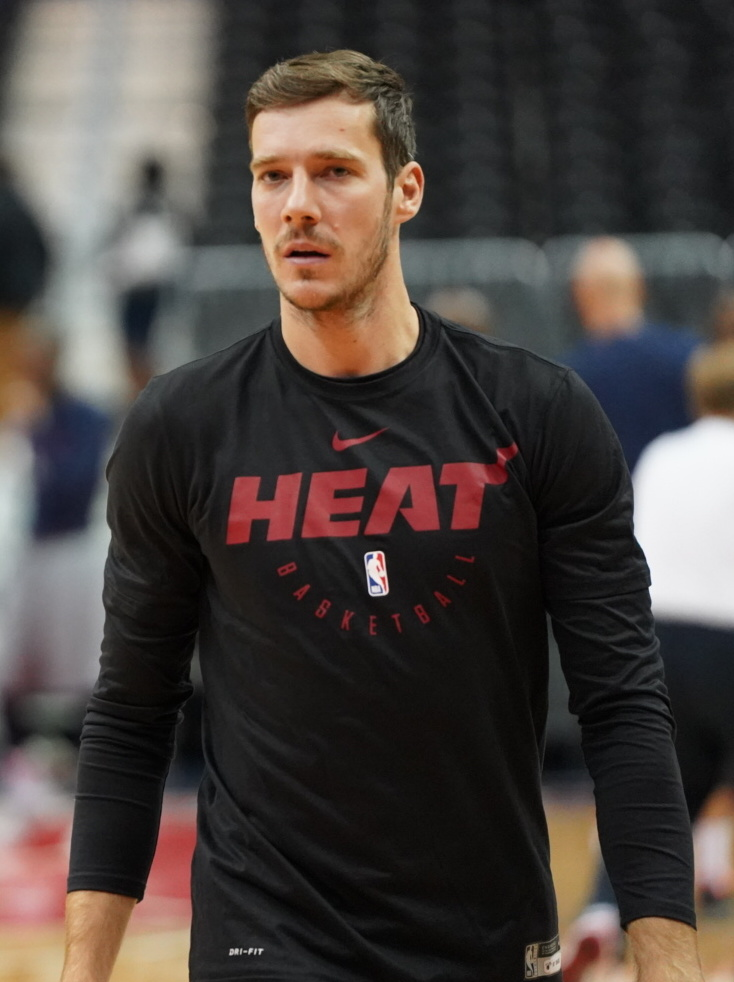
- Dragić with the Miami Heat in 2018

Personal information
- Born: 6 May 1986 (age 40) Ljubljana, SR Slovenia, Yugoslavia
- Listed height: 6 ft 4 in (1.93 m)
- Listed weight: 190 lb (86 kg)

Career information
- NBA draft: 2008: 2nd round, 45th overall pick
- Drafted by: San Antonio Spurs
- Playing career: 2004–2023
- Position: Point guard
- Number: 1, 2, 3, 6, 7, 9, 31

Career history
- 2004–2006: Geoplin Slovan
- 2006–2007: Murcia
- 2007–2008: Union Olimpija
- 2008–2011: Phoenix Suns
- 2011–2012: Houston Rockets
- 2011: Saski Baskonia
- 2012–2015: Phoenix Suns
- 2015–2021: Miami Heat
- 2021–2022: Toronto Raptors
- 2022: Brooklyn Nets
- 2022–2023: Chicago Bulls
- 2023: Milwaukee Bucks

Career highlights
- NBA All-Star (2018); All-NBA Third Team (2014); NBA Most Improved Player (2014); FIBA EuroBasket MVP (2017); Euroscar Player of the Year (2017); Basque Cup winner (2011); FIBA Stanković Cup MVP (2010); Slovenian League champion (2008); Slovenian Cup winner (2008); Slovenian Supercup winner (2008); Slovenian League All-Star (2006); Slovenian League Rookie of the Year (2005); Slovenian Sportsman of the Year (2017); No. 3 retired by Slovenia national team

Career NBA statistics
- Points: 12,568 (13.3 ppg)
- Rebounds: 2,816 (3.0 rpg)
- Assists: 4,405 (4.7 apg)
- Stats at NBA.com
- Stats at Basketball Reference
Medals
Men's basketball
Representing Slovenia
FIBA EuroBasket
Gold medal – first place	2017 Finland–Israel–Romania–Turkey
FIBA Europe Under-20 Championship
Gold medal – first place	2004 Brno	Under-20 Team

Goran Dragić (born 6 May 1986) is a Slovenian former professional basketball player. Nicknamed "the Dragon", he played professional basketball in Slovenia and Spain before entering the NBA in 2008. Dragić also played for the Phoenix Suns, Miami Heat, Houston Rockets, Toronto Raptors, Brooklyn Nets, Chicago Bulls and the Milwaukee Bucks. He was an All-NBA Third Team selection and the NBA Most Improved Player with the Suns in 2014. He was named an NBA All-Star for the first time in 2018 with Miami.

Internationally, Dragić led the senior Slovenian national team to its first FIBA EuroBasket title in 2017, while being named the MVP of the tournament. He is second in all-time points scored for the team and has played ninety games for his country.

== Professional career ==
=== Slovan (2004–2006) ===
Dragić made his debut in 2003, at the age of 17, in the Slovenian minor league with KK Ilirija. After one year, Dragic transferred to the top-level Slovenian Basketball League and Adriatic League club Slovan in 2004.

=== Murcia (2006–2007) ===
After spending two years with Slovan, Dragic transferred to the Spanish ACB League club Saski Baskonia, who loaned him to the Spanish club Murcia, in 2006.

=== Olimpija (2007–2008) ===
Dragić joined the Slovenian club Union Olimpija in 2007, and he played there during the 2007–08 season, winning the Slovenian League championship with the team.

=== Phoenix Suns (2008–2011) ===
Dragić entered the 2008 NBA draft, where he was selected in the second round, 45th overall, by the San Antonio Spurs. His draft rights were then traded to the Phoenix Suns in exchange for cash considerations in addition to the draft rights to Malik Hairston, the 48th pick. After the Suns finished a deal with TAU Ceramica (now known as Caja Laboral), with whom he was under contract, they officially signed him on 22 September 2008. The Suns hoped that he would take over the starting point guard position after Steve Nash relinquished it. On 25 January 2010, Dragić scored a then career high 32 points, hitting 6 of 7 three-pointers in a losing effort against the Utah Jazz.

On 7 May 2010, during game 3 of the Western Conference Semifinals, he led a Phoenix Suns comeback against the team that originally drafted him, the San Antonio Spurs, scoring 23 of his total 26 points in the fourth quarter. Dragić scored his points on 10/13 FG attempts including 5/5 three-pointers and a 4-point play, as the Suns overcame an early 18-point deficit to defeat the Spurs 110–96 and take a 3–0 lead in their best of seven series in the Western Conference Semifinals. "I think it's safe to say that may have been the best fourth-quarter performance I have ever seen in a playoff game", Suns forward Grant Hill said.

=== Houston Rockets (2011) ===
On 24 February 2011, Dragić was traded to the Houston Rockets along with a protected first-round pick in exchange for Aaron Brooks. On 13 April 2011, in the Rockets' season finale, Dragić recorded his first career triple-double with 11 points, 11 assists and 11 rebounds in a 121–102 win over the Minnesota Timberwolves.

=== Baskonia (2011) ===
During the 2011 NBA lockout, Dragić played for Saski Baskonia of Spain. He played for a brief period of time there until the lockout ended.

=== Return to Houston (2011–2012) ===
Dragić returned to the Rockets for the 2011–12 season. Throughout most of the season, Dragić continued to be used as a bench player as a means to help the Rockets out during the lockout shortened season. In March 2012, he filled in for Kyle Lowry, who was out with a bacterial infection. On 9 April 2012, Dragić won the Western Conference Player of the Week.

=== Return to Phoenix (2012–2015) ===
In 2012, Dragić became an unrestricted free agent. He agreed to sign a 4-year, $30 million deal with a player option on the final year with the Phoenix Suns and officially became a member of the team again on 19 July 2012. He was brought in to replace Steve Nash, whom he played behind during his first stint with the Suns, as starting point guard. On 19 February 2013, Dragić recorded a career-high 18 assists to go with 14 points as the Suns defeated the Portland Trail Blazers 102–98. Dragić nearly recorded a triple-double against the Brooklyn Nets with 31 points, 12 assists, and 9 rebounds on 24 March 2013. Despite suffering through a 25–57 season, Dragić ended up gaining some career high moments in the process.

After getting Eric Bledsoe from a trade with the Los Angeles Clippers, the Suns ultimately decided to move Dragić to the shooting guard position as a means of putting less pressure on Dragić to distribute the ball to his teammates. In his first game playing with Bledsoe as a teammate, Dragić led the team with 26 points and 9 assists in a 104–91 season opening victory over the Portland Trail Blazers. Dragić had over 8 games with 30 points or more, including a double-double of 31 points and 10 assists in a victory against the Portland Trail Blazers on 27 November 2013. He also had what was, at the time, a career-high 33 points in a loss to the Memphis Grizzlies on 2 January 2014. On 3 February 2014, Dragić won his second career Western Conference Player of the Week award and his first with the Suns for games played between 27 January – 2 February 2014. Three days later, he was paired with Oklahoma City Thunder guard Reggie Jackson in the revamped, team-based Skills Challenge at the All-Star weekend

On 8 February 2014, Dragić scored a career-high 34 points— while attempting only 13 field-goals— to go along with 10 assists in a 122–109 home victory over the Golden State Warriors. On 23 February 2014, Dragić scored a new career-high 35 points, along with 3 assists and 3 steals, in a 112–115 loss to the Houston Rockets. On 28 February 2014, he recorded a new career-high 40 points, along with 3 rebounds and 5 assists, in a 116–104 win over the New Orleans Pelicans. He became the first player, since Rod Strickland in 1985–86, to set career highs in points three times in a single month. Dragić also became the sixth player, after his head coach Jeff Hornacek, Dražen Petrović, Dirk Nowitzki, LeBron James, and Kevin Durant, to join the 20-50-40 Club — averaging 20 or more points per game while shooting 50%+ from the field and 40%+ on three-pointers. He also averaged over 5 assists per game throughout the season as well, leaving him joining the likes of Larry Bird, Jeff Hornacek and LeBron James.

On 23 April 2014, Dragić won the 2014 NBA Most Improved Player Award. One month later, he would end up being honored by his home nation with their national "Apple of Inspiration" award for being a role model and inspiring hope in Slovenia, as well as helping out the nation's community with humanitarian activities. Finally, on 4 June 2014, Dragić was named to the 2014 All-NBA Third Team alongside Damian Lillard, LaMarcus Aldridge, Al Jefferson and Paul George.

=== Miami Heat (2015–2021) ===
==== 2015–2017: First years in Miami ====
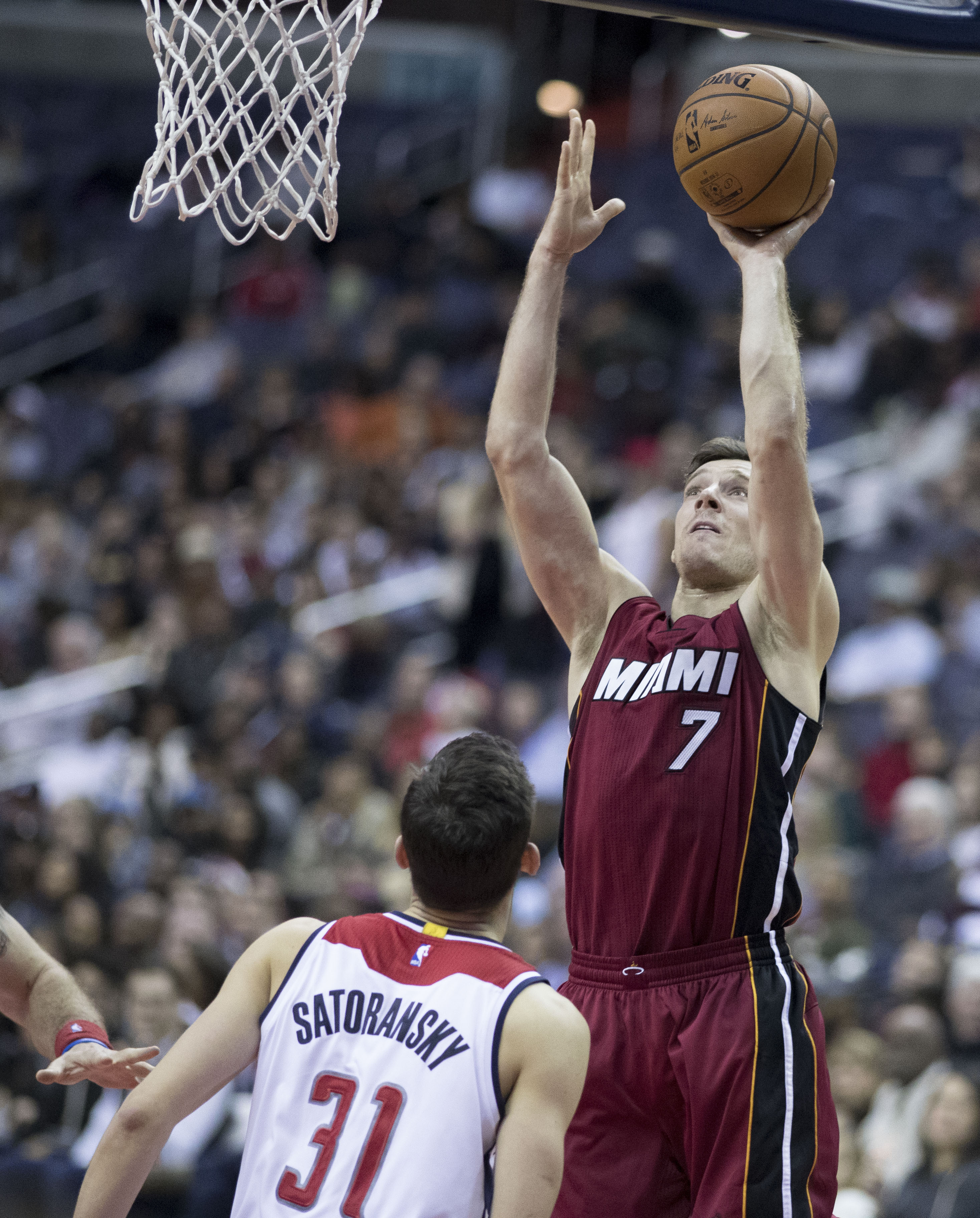
Dragić with the Heat in 2016

On 19 February 2015, Dragić and his brother Zoran Dragic, were traded to the Miami Heat in a three-team deal also involving the New Orleans Pelicans that sent John Salmons and Danny Granger to Phoenix. Two days later, he made his debut for the Heat, recording 12 points and 3 rebounds in a 105–91 loss to the New Orleans Pelicans. Dragić finished the season averaging 16.6 points and 5.3 assists per game in 26 starts for Miami, as the Heat missed the playoffs barely.

On 9 July 2015, Dragić re-signed with the Heat to a five-year, $90 million contract. In January 2016, he missed eight straight games because of a left calf injury. On 20 February 2016, he recorded a season-high 24 points, eight assists and seven rebounds in a 114–84 win over the Washington Wizards. He bested that season high on 11 March, recording 26 points and nine assists in a 118–96 win over the Chicago Bulls. On 7 April, he recorded 16 points and a career-high 12 rebounds in a 106–98 win over the Chicago Bulls, helping the Heat sweep the season series with the Bulls for the first time since the 2003–04 season. In the Heat's second-round playoff match-up with the Toronto Raptors, Dragić scored a postseason career-high 30 points to help the Heat to a 103–91 victory in Game 6, tying the series at 3–3. The Heat went on to lose Game 7, bowing out of the playoffs with a 4–3 defeat.

On 28 November 2016, Dragić recorded season highs of 27 points and 17 assists in a 112–104 loss to the Boston Celtics. He topped that mark on 6 December 2016, scoring 29 points (his highest-scoring total as a member of the Heat at the time) in a 114–103 loss to the New York Knicks. Dragić set a new season high six days later, scoring 34 points in a 112–101 win over the Washington Wizards. On 6 February 2017, he scored 33 points and hit a career-high seven three-pointers to lead the Heat to their 11th straight victory with a 115–113 win over the Minnesota Timberwolves.

==== 2017–2021: All-Star and Finals appearance ====
On 8 November 2017, Dragić scored a season-high 29 points in a 126–115 win over the Phoenix Suns. On 27 November 2017, he was named the Eastern Conference Player of the Week for games played 20 November through 26 November. On 15 January 2018, he was named the Eastern Conference Player of the Week for games played 8 January through 14 January. It was his fourth career Player of the Week honor. On 1 February, Dragić was named the replacement for Kevin Love on Team LeBron for the 2018 NBA All-Star Game, thus making him an All-Star for the first time in his career.

On 27 October 2018, Dragić scored 28 points in a 120–111 win over the Portland Trail Blazers, becoming the first Slovenian player to reach the 10,000-point mark in the NBA. In late November and early December, he missed eight games with a sore right knee. On 19 December, he underwent successful surgery to clean up his right knee. He returned to action on 23 February 2019 against the Detroit Pistons. On 28 March, he recorded his second career triple-double with 23 points, 12 rebounds and 11 assists in a 105–99 win over the Dallas Mavericks.

In the 2019–20 NBA season, Dragić helped the Heat through the 2020 NBA Playoffs. In Game 1 of the Eastern Conference Finals, Dragic scored a team-leading 29 points during a 117–114 overtime win over the Boston Celtics. After winning that series, in the 2020 NBA Finals they faced the Los Angeles Lakers. Dragić missed 4 games in the Finals due to a plantar fasciitis injury that he suffered in Game 1. The Heat lost the series in six games.

On 30 December 2020, Dragić scored a season-high 26 points, alongside five rebounds and two assists, in a 119–108 win over the Milwaukee Bucks. On 26 February 2021, he scored 26 points, alongside three rebounds, two assists and two steals, in a 124–116 win over the Utah Jazz. During the first round of the playoffs, the Heat faced the Bucks. On 22 May, Dragić recorded 25 points and two rebounds in a 109–107 Game 1 loss.

=== Toronto Raptors (2021–2022) ===
On 6 August 2021, the Toronto Raptors acquired Dragić and Precious Achiuwa from the Heat via a sign-and-trade in exchange for Kyle Lowry. Shortly after being acquired by the Raptors, Dragić gave an interview in his native Slovenia where he reportedly stated that he did not want to play for the team and that he had "higher ambitions;" he would apologize shortly after for his comments and ultimately suit up to start the season with Toronto.

On 28 November, Dragić announced he was stepping away from the Raptors for personal reasons. On 10 February 2022, Dragić and a 2022 first-round pick were traded to the San Antonio Spurs in exchange for Drew Eubanks, Thaddeus Young and a 2022 second-round pick. He and the Spurs agreed to a contract buyout five days later.

=== Brooklyn Nets (2022) ===
On 22 February 2022, Dragić signed with the Brooklyn Nets. He made his Nets debut four days later, recording six points, three rebounds and two assists in a 126–123 win over the Milwaukee Bucks. On 16 March, Dragić scored a season-high 21 points, alongside three rebounds and four assists, in a 113–111 loss to the Dallas Mavericks. The Nets faced the Boston Celtics during the first round of the playoffs, but were eliminated in a four-game sweep.

=== Chicago Bulls (2022–2023) ===
On 2 August 2022, Dragić signed with the Chicago Bulls. On 28 February 2023, he was waived by the Bulls.

=== Milwaukee Bucks (2023) ===
On 4 March 2023, Dragić signed with the Milwaukee Bucks.

On 31 December 2023, Dragić announced his retirement from professional basketball.

== National team career ==
=== Slovenian junior national team ===
Dragić won the gold medal at the 2004 FIBA Europe Under-20 Championship with the Slovenian under-20 junior national team. He also played at the 2005 FIBA Europe Under-20 Championship.

=== Slovenian senior national team ===
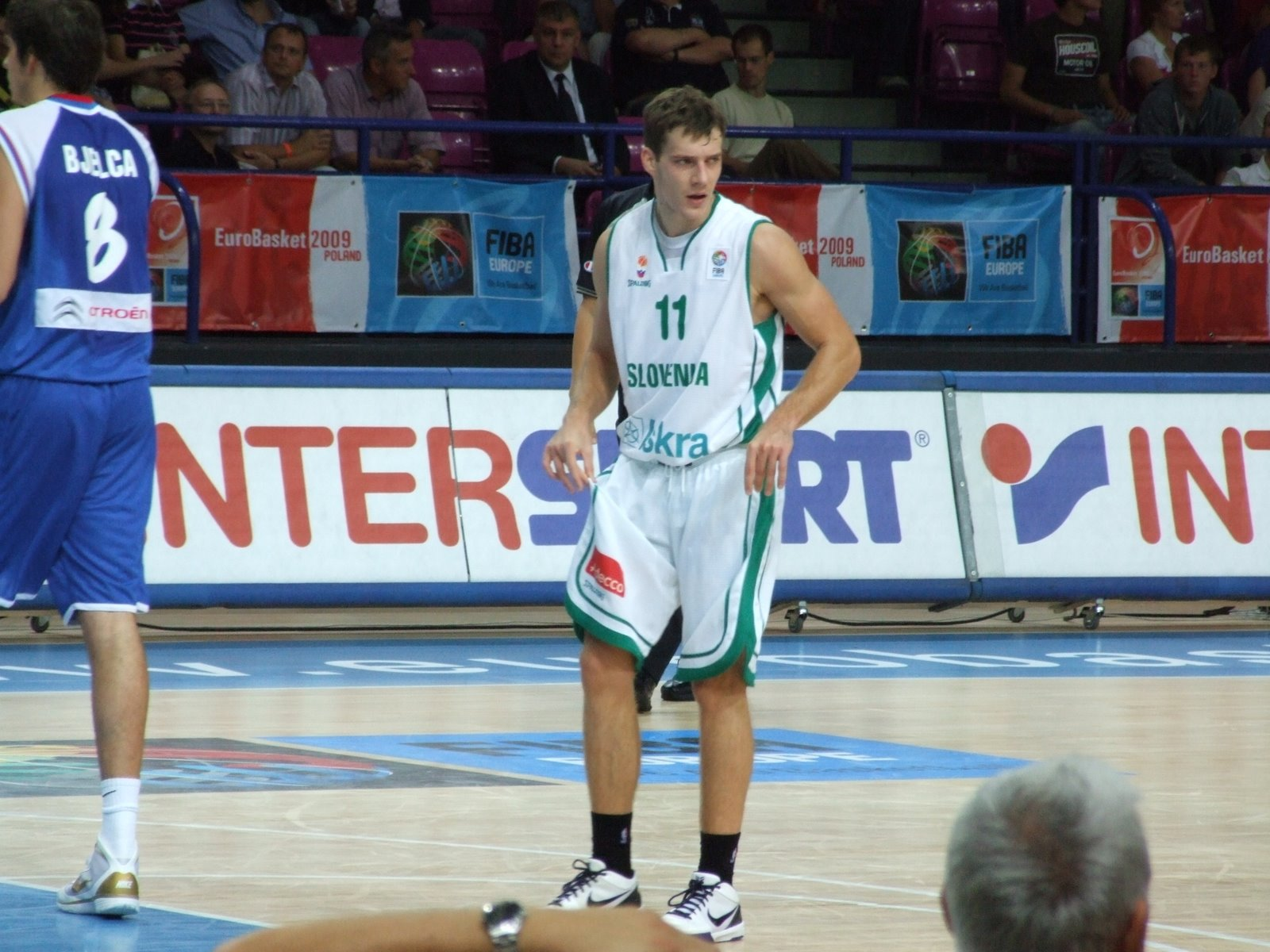
Dragić playing with Slovenia at the 2009 EuroBasket

Dragić competed with the senior men's Slovenian national basketball team at the 2006 FIBA World Championship and the 2007 EuroBasket, in limited roles. Dragić's role with the Slovenian national basketball team began to increase in the 2009 EuroBasket and the 2010 FIBA World Championship. He then played with his brother Zoran in the 2011 EuroBasket and the 2013 EuroBasket, the latter which was held in Slovenia. During the 2013 tournament, Goran and his brother helped lead Slovenia to a 5th-place finish and a spot in the 2014 FIBA World Cup. Dragić finished in the 2013 EuroBasket's top five in points and assists, which earned him a spot on the All-Tournament Team. In 2014, Dragić was named Slovenia's team captain after Jaka Lakovič retired from national team play. In the friendly games before the 2014 FIBA World Cup, Dragić was rested in 9 of their 14 games, before actually playing in the official tournament's matches. After finishing up their friendly games, Dragić played with no restrictions beyond the rest of the competition; he was the only All-NBA Team member to play in the 2014 FIBA World Cup, aside from the Team USA members.

Prior to the 2017 EuroBasket, Dragić announced that he would retire from playing with the Slovenian national team after the tournament. At the tournament, he helped Slovenia to win its first ever FIBA European championship. He scored 35 points, on 12-22 shooting in the final, which was the most points scored in a final, since Pau Gasol scored 36 points in the 2003 final. Following his performance, Dragić was given the Most Valuable Player award of the tournament, after averaging 22.6 points per game, in 9 games played. Following that performance, he was named the 2017 Slovenian Sportsman of the year.

Five years later, in June 2022, Dragić returned to the Slovenian team to play in the third window of the qualification for the 2023 FIBA Basketball World Cup. On 30 June, he scored 19 points in his first game back, helping his country to a blowout win over Croatia.

Dragić also played at EuroBasket 2022, averaging 14.9 points on 49.4% shooting as the team's sixth man. Slovenia was surprisingly eliminated by Poland in the quarter-finals.

Dragić was Slovenia's all-time scoring leader with 1,050 points in his 90 games, before being surpassed by Luka Doncic on 4 September 2025.

His jersey number 3 was retired by the Basketball Federation of Slovenia on 23 August 2024, ahead of his farewell game at the Arena Stožice in Ljubljana.

== Personal life ==
Dragić was born to a Slovenian mother and a Serbian father. He grew up in Slovenia playing football. However, an injury forced him to switch sports. As a child, he admired NBA players Michael Jordan, Allen Iverson and future teammate Steve Nash. He is fluent in Slovene, Serbian, Spanish, and English. Dragić's younger brother, Zoran, was formerly his teammate on the Phoenix Suns and Miami Heat.

Dragić has two children with his ex-wife.

He and Zoran, alongside teammates Markieff and Marcus Morris, all briefly played together for the Suns during the fourth quarter of their 112–96 victory over the Philadelphia 76ers on 2 January 2015. It marked the first time in the NBA's history that two different pairs of brothers played together for the same team at the same time.

President of Republika Srpska Milorad Dodik honored Dragić with an Order of Njegoš and a Medal of Merit for the People, in August 2018.

Dragić is a Serbian Orthodox Christian.

== NBA career statistics ==
Legend
GP	Games played	GS	Games started	MPG	Minutes per game
FG%	Field goal percentage	3P%	3-point field goal percentage	FT%	Free throw percentage
RPG	Rebounds per game	APG	Assists per game	SPG	Steals per game
BPG	Blocks per game	PPG	Points per game	**Bold**	Career high
*	Led the league

=== Regular season ===
Year	Team	GP	GS	MPG	FG%	3P%	FT%	RPG	APG	SPG	BPG	PPG
2008–09	Phoenix	55	1	13.2	.393	.370	.769	1.9	2.0	.5	.1	4.5
2009–10	Phoenix	**80**	2	18.0	.452	.394	.736	2.1	3.0	.6	.1	7.9
2010–11	Phoenix	48	2	17.8	.421	.277	.608	1.8	3.1	.8	.1	7.4
2010–11	Houston	22	3	17.2	.472	**.519**	.667	2.5	2.5	.6	.2	7.7
2011–12	Houston	66*	28	26.5	.462	.337	.805	2.5	5.3	1.3	.2	11.7
2012–13	Phoenix	77	**77**	33.5	.443	.319	.748	3.1	**7.4**	**1.6**	**.3**	14.7
2013–14	Phoenix	76	75	**35.1**	**.505**	.408	.760	3.2	5.9	1.4	.3	**20.3**
2014–15	Phoenix	52	52	33.4	.501	.355	.746	3.6	4.1	1.0	.2	16.2
2014–15	Miami	26	26	34.8	.502	.329	.808	3.4	5.3	1.1	.2	16.6
2015–16	Miami	72	72	32.8	.489	.317	.667	3.8	5.8	1.0	.2	14.1
2016–17	Miami	73	73	33.7	.476	.406	.790	3.8	5.8	1.2	.2	**20.3**
2017–18	Miami	75	75	31.7	.450	.370	.801	**4.1**	4.8	.8	.2	17.3
2018–19	Miami	36	22	27.5	.413	.348	.782	3.1	4.8	.8	.1	13.7
2019–20	Miami	59	3	28.2	.441	.367	.776	3.2	5.1	.7	.2	16.2
2020–21	Miami	50	11	26.7	.432	.373	.828	3.4	4.4	.7	.2	13.4
2021–22	Toronto	5	2	18.0	.382	.286	**1.000**	2.8	1.8	1.0	.2	8.0
2021–22	Brooklyn	16	6	25.5	.376	.245	.739	3.2	4.8	.9	.2	7.3
2022–23	Chicago	51	0	15.4	.425	.352	.659	1.4	2.7	.2	.1	6.4
2022–23	Milwaukee	7	0	11.9	.389	.412	**1.000**	1.7	1.7	.3	.0	5.6
Career		946	530	27.1	.459	.362	.766	3.0	4.7	.9	.2	13.3
All-Star		1	0	11.0	.333	.000	.000	4.0	1.0	.0	.0	2.0

=== Playoffs ===
Year	Team	GP	GS	MPG	FG%	3P%	FT%	RPG	APG	SPG	BPG	PPG
2010	Phoenix	16	0	14.8	.430	.325	.742	1.8	2.3	.3	.1	7.6
2016	Miami	14	14	**33.7**	.442	.348	.767	**4.9**	3.9	.4	.2	16.5
2018	Miami	5	5	31.2	.467	**.381**	.682	2.6	**4.6**	**1.0**	.0	18.6
2020	Miami	**17**	**16**	32.5	.444	.346	.803	4.1	4.4	**1.0**	.1	**19.1**
2021	Miami	4	2	29.3	.426	.346	.750	1.8	2.8	**1.0**	**.5**	16.0
2022	Brooklyn	4	0	19.8	**.563**	.333	**1.000**	4.5	1.5	.8	.0	10.5
2023	Milwaukee	2	0	3.6	.000	.000	**1.000**	.0	.5	.0	.0	2.0
Career		62	37	26.2	.446	.344	.771	3.3	3.3	.6	.1	14.2

== Awards and accomplishments ==
- Won the gold medal at the FIBA Europe Under-20 Championship (2004)
- Slovenian League Rookie of the Year (2005)
- Slovenian League All-Star (2005, 2006)
- Winner of the FIBA Borislav Stanković Tournament (2007, 2010)
- Won the Slovenian League national championship (2008)
- Won the MVP award for the FIBA Borislav Stanković Tournament (2010)
- Named Western Conference Player of the Week, 4/2-4/8 (Houston, 2012)
- Member of the EuroBasket All-Tournament Team (2013)
- Named Western Conference Player of the Week, 1/27-2/2 (Phoenix, 2014)
- Contestant for the Taco Bell Skills Challenge (2014)
- Member of the 20-50-40 Club (2014)
- Won the NBA Most Improved Player of the Year Award (2014)
- Jabolko Navdiha (Apple of Inspiration) by President of the Republic of Slovenia (2014)
- Member of the All-NBA Third Team (2014)
- FIBA EuroBasket MVP (2017)
- Member of the EuroBasket All-Tournament Team (2017)
- NBA All-Star (2018)

== See also ==
- List of European basketball players in the United States
