= 1993 FIBA Oceania Championship =

Continental basketball championship

FIBA Oceania Championship 1993
11th FIBA Oceanian Basketball Championship

Tournament details
- Host country: New Zealand
- Dates: 7–10 June
- Teams: 3 (from 21 federations)
- Venue: 1 (in 1 host city)

Final positions
- Champions: Australia (11th title)

The FIBA Oceania Championship for Men 1993 was the qualifying tournament of FIBA Oceania for the 1994 FIBA World Championship. The tournament was held in Auckland. Australia won its 11th Oceania Championship to qualify for the World Championship.

== Results ==
| Pos | Team | Pld | W | L | PF | PA | PD | Pts | Qualification |
|---|---|---|---|---|---|---|---|---|---|
| 1 | Australia | 2 | 2 | 0 | 197 | 137 | +60 | 4 | Championship |
| 2 | New Zealand (H) | 2 | 1 | 1 | 157 | 153 | +4 | 3 | Championship |
| 3 | Western Samoa | 2 | 0 | 2 | 131 | 195 | −64 | 2 | |

(H) Hosts

7 June

| New Zealand | 92–59 | Western Samoa |

8 June

| Australia | 94–65 | New Zealand |

9 June

| Australia | 103–72 | Western Samoa |

== Championship ==
10 June

| Australia | 86–78 | New Zealand |

== Final standings ==
| Rank | Team | Record |
|---|---|---|
| 1 | Australia | 3–0 |
| 2 | New Zealand | 1–2 |
| 3 | Western Samoa | 0–2 |

Australia qualified for the 1994 FIBA World Championship.
