= Australia men's national basketball team 2011–12 results =

== YouYi Games ==
One HD

24 June 2011

Australia 67, China 65 (OT)

Challenge Stadium, Perth, Australia
Attendance: 4,500

One HD

26 June 2011

China 57, Australia 62

Singapore Indoor Stadium, Singapore
Attendance: 6,287

== 2011 Stanković Continental Champions' Cup ==
CCTV-5

1 August 2011

Australia 97, Russia 99 (OT)

Haining City Stadium, Haining City, China

CCTV-5

2 August 2011

Angola 68, Australia 76

Haining City Stadium, Haining City, China

CCTV-5

3 August 2011

China 62, Australia 69

Haining City Stadium, Haining City, China

=== Final ===
CCTV-5

4 August 2011

Australia 66, Angola 85

Haining City Stadium, Haining City, China

== London International Basketball Invitational (2012 Olympic Games Test Event) ==
.

16 August 2011

Australia 71, China 43

Basketball Arena, London, United Kingdom

.

17 August 2011

Australia 67, France 71

Basketball Arena, London, United Kingdom

.

18 August 2011

Australia 78, Croatia 66

Basketball Arena, London, United Kingdom

GB Sport TV

20 August 2011

Australia 78, Serbia 69

Basketball Arena, London, United Kingdom

BBC

21 August 2011

Great Britain 90, Australia 91 (OT)

Basketball Arena, London, United Kingdom

== Friendlies ==
laSexta

25 August 2011

Spain 68, Australia 51

Palacio de Deportes de Murcia, Murcia, Spain
Attendance: 7,500

laSexta

26 August 2011

Spain 97, Australia 58

Pabellon Municipal Fuente San Luis, Valencia, Spain

== 2011 FIBA Oceania Championship ==
One HD

7 September 2011

Australia 91, New Zealand 78

State Netball and Hockey Centre, Melbourne, Australia
Attendance: 3,500

One HD

9 September 2011

Australia 81, New Zealand 64

Brisbane Entertainment Centre, Brisbane, Australia
Attendance: 4,070

One HD

11 September 2011

Australia 92, New Zealand 68

Sydney Entertainment Centre, Sydney, Australia
