= Australia men's national basketball team 2013–14 results =

== Sino-Australia Challenge ==
Fox Sports

7 June 2013

Australia 55, China 61

Perth Arena, Perth, Australia

Fox Sports

9 June 2013

Australia 85, China 50

Western Australian Basketball Centre, Perth, Australia

Fox Sports

12 June 2013

China 65, Australia 68

Tianjin Arena, Tianjin, China

Fox Sports

14 June 2013

China 88, Australia 81

Yongcheng City Sports Arena, Yongcheng, China

Australia win series 2-2, 289-264 on points differential

== 2013 Stanković Continental Champions' Cup ==
.

27 June 2013

Australia 62, Argentina 59

Lanzhou Sports Centre, Lanzhou, China

.

28 June 2013

China 59, Australia 64

Lanzhou Sports Centre, Lanzhou, China

.

29 June 2013

Australia 72, Puerto Rico 68

Lanzhou Sports Centre, Lanzhou, China

.

30 June 2013

Australia 79, Germany 64

Lanzhou Sports Centre, Lanzhou, China

.

2 July 2013

Australia 76, Nigeria 61

Lanzhou Sports Centre, Lanzhou, China

Australia are 2013 Stanković Continental Champions' Cup (Lanzhou Tournament) champions

== Friendly ==
.

10 August 2013

Australia 96, Butler University 57

AIS Training Hall, Canberra, Australia

== 2013 FIBA Oceania Championship ==
ABC1

14 August 2013

New Zealand 59, Australia 70

North Shore Events Centre, Auckland, New Zealand

ABC1

18 August 2013

Australia 76, New Zealand 63

AIS Arena, Canberra, Australia
