= 1994 FIBA World Championship =

1994 edition of the FIBA World Championship

FIBA Championnat du monde de basket-ball masculin 1994

Tournament details
- Host country: Canada
- Cities: Toronto; Hamilton
- Dates: August 4–14
- Officially opened by: Ray Hnatyshyn
- Teams: 16 (from 5 confederations)
- Venue(s): SkyDome; Maple Leaf Gardens; Copps Coliseum

Final positions
- Champions: United States (3rd title)
- Runners-up: Russia
- Third place: Croatia
- Fourth place: Greece

Tournament statistics
- Games played: 64
- MVP: (United States) Shaquille O'Neal
- Top scorer: (Australia) Andrew Gaze (23.9 points per game)

The 1994 FIBA World Championship was the 12th FIBA World Championship, the international basketball world championship for men's national teams. The tournament was hosted by Canada from August 4 to 14, 1994. The tournament was held at SkyDome and Maple Leaf Gardens in Toronto as well as at Copps Coliseum in Hamilton. The hosting duties were originally awarded to Belgrade, Yugoslavia, but after the United Nations limited participation in sporting events in Yugoslavia, Toronto stepped in as a replacement option in 1992.

The 1994 FIBA World Championship was the first time that the FIBA World Championship (now called the FIBA Basketball World Cup) allowed current American NBA players that had already played in an official NBA regular season game to participate. Prior to that only professionals from other leagues were allowed to compete, since players from other leagues were still considered amateurs.

The tournament was won by the United States's "Dream Team II", who beat Russia 137–91 in the Final. The United States finished with a perfect 8–0 record (8 wins and 0 losses). The bronze medal was won by Croatia who beat Greece 78–60 in the bronze-medal game.

== Venues ==
Three stadia were used during the tournament:

Toronto		Hamilton
SkyDome	Maple Leaf Gardens	Copps Coliseum
Capacity: 28,708	Capacity: 16,538	Capacity: 18,436
1994 FIBA World Championship is located in Southern Ontario

== Qualification ==
There were 16 teams taking part in the 1994 World Cup of Basketball. After the 1992 Olympics, the continental allocation for FIBA Americas was reduced by one when the United States won the Olympic tournament, automatically qualifying them for the 1994 World Cup.

- Host nation: 1 berth
- 1992 Summer Olympics: 12 teams competing for 1 berth, removed from that country's FIBA zone.
- FIBA Oceania: 3 teams competing for 1 berth
- FIBA Europe: 16 teams competing for 5 berths
- FIBA Americas: 10 teams competing for 4 berths
- FIBA Africa: 9 teams competing for 2 berths
- FIBA Asia: 18 teams competing for 2 berths

=== Qualified teams ===
Means of qualification	Date	Venue	Berths	Teams qualified
Host	–		1	Canada
1992 Olympic men's basketball tournament	July 26–August 8, 1992	(Spain) Barcelona	1	United States
1993 FIBA Oceania Championship	June 7–10, 1993	(New Zealand) Auckland	1	Australia
EuroBasket 1993	June 22–July 4, 1993	(Germany) Berlin, Karlsruhe and Munich	5	Germany; Russia; Croatia; Greece; Spain
1993 Tournament of the Americas	August 28–September 5, 1993	(Puerto Rico) San Juan	4	Puerto Rico; Argentina; Brazil; Cuba
FIBA Africa Championship 1993	September 18–28, 1993	(Kenya) Nairobi	2	Angola; Egypt
1993 ABC Championship	November 12–21, 1993	(Indonesia) Jakarta	2	China; ~~North Korea~~; South Korea *
Total			16	

* North Korea withdrew from the tournament, South Korea replaced them.

== Draw ==
Group A	Group B	Group C	Group D
Brazil; China; Spain; United States	Australia; Croatia; Cuba; South Korea	Angola; Argentina; Canada; Russia	Germany; Greece; Egypt; Puerto Rico

== Preliminary round ==
The top two teams from each group remain in medal contention.

=== Group A ===
Pos	Team	Pld	W	L	PF	PA	PD	Pts	Qualification
1	United States	3	3	0	352	259	+93	6	Quarterfinal round
2	China	3	2	1	252	301	−49	5	Quarterfinal round
3	Spain	3	1	2	249	260	−11	4	9th–16th classification round
4	Brazil	3	0	3	242	275	−33	3	9th–16th classification round

Source: FIBA archive
Rules for classification: 1) points; 2) head-to-head points; 3) head-to-head goal average; 4) head-to-head number of points scored.

August 4

China	97–93 (OT)	Brazil
Scoring by half: 38-30, 39-47 Overtime: 20-16

Copps Coliseum, Hamilton

August 4

United States	115–100	Spain
Scoring by half: 59-51, 56-49

Copps Coliseum, Hamilton

August 5

Brazil	67–73	Spain
Scoring by half: 36-30, 31-43

Copps Coliseum, Hamilton

August 5

United States	132–77	China
Scoring by half: 71-38, 61-39

Copps Coliseum, Hamilton

August 7

Spain	76–78	China
Scoring by half: 46-31, 30-47

Copps Coliseum, Hamilton

August 7

United States	105–82	Brazil
Scoring by half: 48-36, 57-46

Copps Coliseum, Hamilton

=== Group B ===
Pos	Team	Pld	W	L	PF	PA	PD	Pts	Qualification
1	Croatia	3	3	0	272	187	+85	6	Quarterfinal round
2	Australia	3	2	1	249	255	−6	5	Quarterfinal round
3	Cuba	3	1	2	244	257	−13	4	9th–16th classification round
4	South Korea	3	0	3	217	283	−66	3	9th–16th classification round

Source: FIBA archive
Rules for classification: 1) points; 2) head-to-head points; 3) head-to-head goal average; 4) head-to-head number of points scored.

August 4

Croatia	85–65	Cuba
Scoring by half: 45-27, 40-38

Copps Coliseum, Hamilton

August 4

Australia	87–85	South Korea
Scoring by half: 59-44, 28-41

Copps Coliseum, Hamilton

August 5

Croatia	104–53	South Korea
Scoring by half: 52-30, 52-23

Maple Leaf Gardens, Toronto

August 5

Cuba	87–93	Australia
Scoring by half: 42-42, 45-51

Maple Leaf Gardens, Toronto

August 6

Cuba	92–79	South Korea
Scoring by half: 46-44, 46-35

Maple Leaf Gardens, Toronto

August 6

Croatia	83–69	Australia
Scoring by half: 43-39, 40-30

Maple Leaf Gardens, Toronto

=== Group C ===
Pos	Team	Pld	W	L	PF	PA	PD	Pts	Qualification
1	Russia	3	3	0	251	187	+64	6	Quarterfinal round
2	Canada (H)	3	2	1	240	198	+42	5	Quarterfinal round
3	Argentina	3	1	2	204	234	−30	4	9th–16th classification round
4	Angola	3	0	3	168	244	−76	3	9th–16th classification round

Source: FIBA archive
Rules for classification: 1) points; 2) head-to-head points; 3) head-to-head goal average; 4) head-to-head number of points scored.
(H) Hosts

August 4

Canada	83–52	Angola
Scoring by half: 39-30, 44-22

Maple Leaf Gardens, Toronto

August 4

Russia	84–64	Argentina
Scoring by half: 38-31, 46-33

Maple Leaf Gardens, Toronto

August 5

Canada	91–73	Argentina
Scoring by half: 30-30, 61-43

Maple Leaf Gardens, Toronto

August 5

Russia	94–57	Angola
Scoring by half: 46-21, 48-36

Maple Leaf Gardens, Toronto

August 6

Argentina	67–59	Angola
Scoring by half: 36-34, 31-25

Copps Coliseum, Hamilton

August 6

Russia	73–66	Canada
Scoring by half: 36-41, 37-25

Copps Coliseum, Hamilton

=== Group D ===
Pos	Team	Pld	W	L	PF	PA	PD	Pts	Qualification
1	Greece	3	2	1	201	183	+18	5 (Note: Head-to-head record: Greece 1–1 (1.02 GAvg), Puerto Rico 1–1 (1.01 GAvg), Germany 1–1 (0.98 GAvg))	Quarterfinal round
2	Puerto Rico	3	2	1	248	219	+29	5	Quarterfinal round
3	Germany	3	2	1	217	198	+19	5	9th–16th classification round
4	Egypt	3	0	3	183	249	−66	3	9th–16th classification round

Source: FIBA archive
Rules for classification: 1) points; 2) head-to-head points; 3) head-to-head goal average; 4) head-to-head number of points scored.
Notes:

August 4

Puerto Rico	102–74	Egypt
Scoring by half: 48-35, 54-39

Maple Leaf Gardens, Toronto

August 4

Greece	68–58	Germany
Scoring by half: 31-35, 37-23

Maple Leaf Gardens, Toronto

August 5

Greece	69–53	Egypt
Scoring by half: 37-28, 32-25

Copps Coliseum, Hamilton

August 5

Puerto Rico	74–81	Germany
Scoring by half: 42-41, 32-40

Copps Coliseum, Hamilton

August 7

Puerto Rico	72–64	Greece
Scoring by half: 35-39, 37-25

Maple Leaf Gardens, Toronto

August 7

Germany	78–56	Egypt
Scoring by half: 39-28, 39-28

Maple Leaf Gardens, Toronto

== Quarterfinal round ==
The top two finishers from Groups I and II advance to the final round.

=== Group I ===
Pos	Team	Pld	W	L	PF	PA	PD	Pts	Qualification
1	United States	3	3	0	375	251	+124	6	Semifinals
2	Russia	3	2	1	298	272	+26	5	Semifinals
3	Australia	3	1	2	244	314	−70	4	5th–8th classification round
4	Puerto Rico	3	0	3	249	329	−80	3	5th–8th classification round

Source: FIBA archive
Rules for classification: 1) points; 2) head-to-head points; 3) head-to-head goal average; 4) head-to-head number of points scored.

August 9

Russia	101–85	Puerto Rico
Scoring by half: 51-47, 50-38

Maple Leaf Gardens, Toronto

August 9

United States	130–74	Australia
Scoring by half: 62-48, 68-26

Maple Leaf Gardens, Toronto

August 10

Australia	76–103	Russia
Scoring by half: 30-55, 46-48

Maple Leaf Gardens, Toronto

August 10

Puerto Rico	83–134	United States
Scoring by half: 25-62, 58-72

Maple Leaf Gardens, Toronto

August 11

Australia	94–81	Puerto Rico
Scoring by half: 51-41, 43-40

Maple Leaf Gardens, Toronto

August 12

United States	111–94	Russia
Scoring by half: 52-44, 59-50

Maple Leaf Gardens, Toronto

=== Group II ===
Pos	Team	Pld	W	L	PF	PA	PD	Pts	Qualification
1	Croatia	3	3	0	278	189	+89	6	Semifinals
2	Greece	3	2	1	206	213	−7	5	Semifinals
3	Canada (H)	3	1	2	222	224	−2	4	5th–8th classification round
4	China	3	0	3	192	272	−80	3	5th–8th classification round

Source: FIBA archive
Rules for classification: 1) points; 2) head-to-head points; 3) head-to-head goal average; 4) head-to-head number of points scored.
(H) Hosts

August 8

Croatia	105–73	China
Scoring by half: 61-41, 44-32

SkyDome, Toronto

August 8

Greece	74–71	Canada
Scoring by half: 40-34, 34-37

Maple Leaf Gardens, Toronto

August 10

Canada	61–92	Croatia
Scoring by half: 30-45, 31-47

Copps Coliseum, Hamilton

August 10

China	61–77	Greece
Scoring by half: 30-35, 31-42

Copps Coliseum, Hamilton

August 11

China	58–90	Canada
Scoring by half: 37-43, 21-47

Maple Leaf Gardens, Toronto

August 12

Croatia	81–55	Greece
Scoring by half: 38-29, 43-26

SkyDome, Toronto

== 9th–16th classification ==
=== Quarterfinal round ===
==== Group III ====
Pos	Team	Pld	W	L	PF	PA	PD	Pts	Qualification
1	Spain	3	3	0	264	179	+85	6	9th–12th classification round
2	Argentina	3	2	1	266	221	+45	5	9th–12th classification round
3	South Korea	3	1	2	229	284	−55	4	13th–16th classification round
4	Egypt	3	0	3	199	274	−75	3	13th–16th classification round

Source: FIBA archive
Rules for classification: 1) points; 2) head-to-head points; 3) head-to-head goal average; 4) head-to-head number of points scored.

August 8

Spain	98–57	South Korea
Scoring by half: 53-39, 45-18

Copps Coliseum, Hamilton

August 8

Argentina	91–66	Egypt
Scoring by half: 52-30, 39-36

Copps Coliseum, Hamilton

August 9

Egypt	52–94	Spain
Scoring by half: 18-40, 34-54

Copps Coliseum, Hamilton

August 9

South Korea	83–105	Argentina
Scoring by half: 45-50, 38-55

Copps Coliseum, Hamilton

August 11

Spain	72–70	Argentina
Scoring by half: 37-34, 35-36

Copps Coliseum, Hamilton

August 11

South Korea	89–81	Egypt
Scoring by half: 49-34, 40-47

Copps Coliseum, Hamilton

==== Group IV ====
Pos	Team	Pld	W	L	PF	PA	PD	Pts	Qualification
1	Germany	3	3	0	268	226	+42	6	9th–12th classification round
2	Brazil	3	1	2	236	251	−15	4 (Note: Head-to-head record: Brazil 1–1 (1.03 GAvg), Cuba 1–1 (0.99 GAvg), Angola 1–1 (0.98 GAvg))	9th–12th classification round
3	Cuba	3	1	2	225	239	−14	4	13th–16th classification round
4	Angola	3	1	2	226	239	−13	4	13th–16th classification round

Source: FIBA archive
Rules for classification: 1) points; 2) head-to-head points; 3) head-to-head goal average; 4) head-to-head number of points scored.
Notes:

August 8

Cuba	76–82	Brazil
Scoring by half: 39-35, 37-47

Copps Coliseum, Hamilton

August 8

Germany	86–76	Angola
Scoring by half: 32-45, 54-31

Copps Coliseum, Hamilton

August 9

Angola	71–75	Cuba
Scoring by half: 39-38, 32-37

Copps Coliseum, Hamilton

August 9

Brazil	76–96	Germany
Scoring by half: 49-48, 27-48

Copps Coliseum, Hamilton

August 11

Cuba	74–86	Germany
Scoring by half: 34-47, 40-39

Copps Coliseum, Hamilton

August 11

Brazil	78–79	Angola
Scoring by half: 44-52, 34-27

Copps Coliseum, Hamilton

=== 13th–16th classification ===
Semifinals
South Korea	75
Angola	71
Egypt	69
Cuba	54

13th place game
South Korea	76
Egypt	69
15th place game
Angola	67
Cuba	75

==== Semifinals ====
August 12

South Korea	75–71	Angola
Scoring by half: 47-46, 28-25

Copps Coliseum, Hamilton

August 12

Cuba	54–69	Egypt
Scoring by half: 28-34, 26-35

Copps Coliseum, Hamilton

==== Fifteenth place playoff ====
August 13

Angola	67–75	Cuba
Scoring by half: 38-40, 29-35

Copps Coliseum, Hamilton

==== Thirteenth place playoff ====
August 13

South Korea	76–69	Egypt
Scoring by half: 41-35, 35-34

Copps Coliseum, Hamilton

=== 9th–12th classification ===
Semifinals
Spain	90
Brazil	85
Argentina	85
Germany	71

9th place game
Spain	65
Argentina	74
11th place game
Brazil	93
Germany	71

==== Semifinals ====
August 12

Spain	90–85	Brazil
Scoring by half: 43-34, 47-51

Copps Coliseum, Hamilton

August 12

Germany	71–85	Argentina
Scoring by half: 41-44, 30-41

Copps Coliseum, Hamilton

==== Eleventh place playoff ====
August 13

Brazil	93–71	Germany
Scoring by half: 48-42, 45-29

Copps Coliseum, Hamilton

==== Ninth place playoff ====
August 13

Spain	65–74	Argentina
Scoring by half: 25-39, 40-35

Copps Coliseum, Hamilton

== 5th–8th classification ==
Semifinals
Australia	95
China	57
Puerto Rico	85
Canada	82

5th place game
Australia	96
Puerto Rico	83
7th place game
China	76
Canada	104

=== Semifinals ===
August 13

Australia	95–57	China
Scoring by half: 44-27, 51-30

SkyDome, Toronto

August 13

Canada	82–85	Puerto Rico
Scoring by half: 47-48, 35-37

SkyDome, Toronto

=== Seventh place playoff ===
August 14

China	76–104	Canada
Scoring by half: 41-51, 35-53

Copps Coliseum, Hamilton

=== Fifth place playoff ===
August 14

Australia	96–83	Puerto Rico
Scoring by half: 57-47, 39-36

Copps Coliseum, Hamilton

== Final round ==
Semifinals
Russia	66
Croatia	64
Greece	58
United States	97

Final
Russia	91
United States	137
Third place game
Croatia	78
Greece	60

=== Semifinals ===
August 13

United States	97–58	Greece
Scoring by half: 40-30, 57-28

SkyDome, Toronto

August 13

Croatia	64–66	Russia
Scoring by half: 22-31, 42-35

SkyDome, Toronto

=== Third place playoff ===
August 14

Greece	60–78	Croatia
Scoring by half: 32-36, 28-42

SkyDome, Toronto

=== Final ===
August 14
16:00

Box

United States	137–91	Russia
Scoring by half: 73–40, 64–51
Pts: Wilkins 20; Rebs: Johnson 11; Asts: Dumars, Price 5		Pts: Babkov 22; Rebs: Kisurin 7 Asts: Bazarevich 7

SkyDome, Toronto
Attendance: 32.616
Referees: Wiesław Zych (POL), Isaac Glass (URU)

== Awards ==
1994 FIBA World Championship winner

United States
Third title

MVP
(United States) Shaquille O'Neal

=== All-Tournament Team ===
- (Russia) Sergei Bazarevich
- (United States) Reggie Miller
- (United States) Shawn Kemp
- (Croatia) Dino Rađa
- (United States) Shaquille O'Neal — MVP

O'Neal, who had a sponsorship deal with Pepsi, declined to accept the MVP award and sent Shawn Kemp in his stead as the award, which was sponsored by Coca-Cola, was a bottle of Coke encased in glass atop a wooden base.

== Top scorers (ppg) ==
1. (Australia) Andrew Gaze 23.9
2. (Croatia) Dino Rađa 22.4
3. (Croatia) Arijan Komazec 19.4
4. (South Korea) Hur Jae 19.4
5. (Brazil) Paolo de Almeida 19.4
6. (South Korea) Moon Kyung-Eun 19
7. (Cuba) Richard Matienzo 18.8
8. (United States) Shaquille O'Neal 18
9. (Argentina) Marcelo Nicola 17.7
10. (United States) Reggie Miller 17.1

== Final standings ==
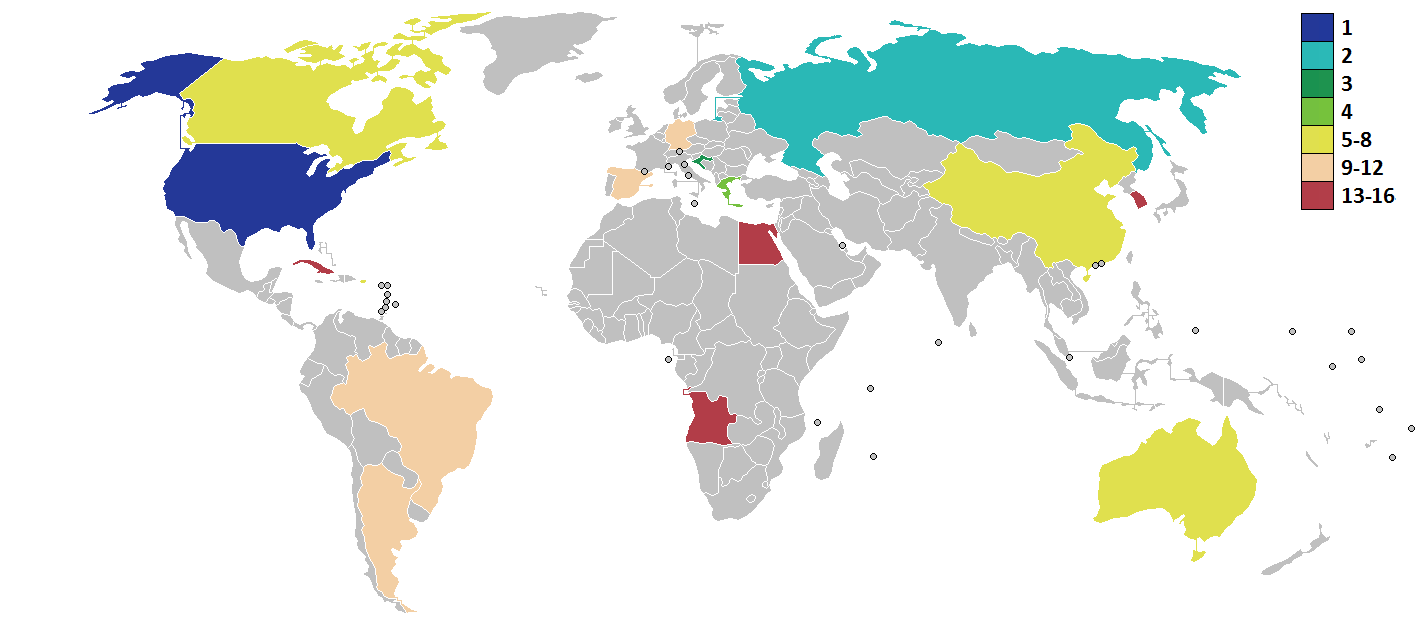
1994 FIBA World Championship final rankings.

Rank	Team	Record
1st place, gold medalist(s)	United States	8–0
2nd place, silver medalist(s)	Russia	6–2
3rd place, bronze medalist(s)	Croatia	7–1
4	Greece	4–4
5	Australia	5–3
6	Puerto Rico	3–5
7	Canada	4–4
8	China	2–6
9	Argentina	5–3
10	Spain	5–3
11	Brazil	2–6
12	Germany	5–3
13	South Korea	3–5
14	Egypt	1–7
15	Cuba	3–5
16	Angola	1–7
