= Australia men's national basketball team 2012–13 results =

== YouYi Games ==
Nine Network

9 June 2012

Australia 66, China 55

Challenge Stadium, Perth, Australia

.

11 June 2012

Australia 69, China 65

Albany Leisure and Aquatic Centre, Albany, Australia

Fox Sports

13 June 2012

Australia 78, China 55

Challenge Stadium, Perth, Australia

== The Farewell Series ==
Fox Sports

24 June 2012

Australia 87, Greece 60

Hisense Arena, Melbourne, Australia
Attendance: 9,000

.

25 June 2012

Australia 91, Greece 51

State Basketball Centre, Melbourne, Australia
Attendance: 3,200

.

27 June 2012

Australia 79, Greece 58

Geelong Arena, Geelong, Australia
Attendance: 2,000

== 2012 Stanković Continental Champions' Cup ==
Fox Sports

6 July 2012

Australia* 76, Russia 61

Huangpu Sports Center, Guangzhou, China

Fox Sports

7 July 2012

China 67, Australia* 44

Huangpu Sports Center, Guangzhou, China

Fox Sports

8 July 2012

Australia* 60, Tunisia 62

Huangpu Sports Center, Guangzhou, China

=== Final ===
Fox Sports

10 July 2012

China 70, Australia* 51

Huangpu Sports Center, Guangzhou, China

Note: * indicates B team

== Friendlies ==
.

17 July 2012

Spain 75, Australia 69

Palacio Municipal de Deportes de Granada, Granada, Spain
Attendance: 6,500

.

18 July 2012

Spain 81, Australia 75

Palacio de Deportes José María Martín Carpena, Málaga, Spain
Attendance: 10,000

== Intercontinental Basket Strasbourg 2012 ==
.

22 July 2012

Australia 71, Brazil 87

Rhénus Sport, Strasbourg, France

.

23 July 2012

France 67, Australia 69

Rhénus Sport, Strasbourg, France

== 2012 Olympic Games ==
Nine Network

29 July 2012

Australia 71, Brazil 75

Basketball Arena, London, United Kingdom

Nine Network

31 July 2012

Australia 70, Spain 82

Basketball Arena, London, United Kingdom

Nine Network

2 August 2012

Australia 81, China 61

Basketball Arena, London, United Kingdom

Nine Network

4 August 2012

Great Britain 75, Australia 106

Basketball Arena, London, United Kingdom

Nine Network

6 August 2012

Australia 82, Russia 80

Basketball Arena, London, United Kingdom

=== Quarter-final ===
Nine Network

8 August 2012

United States 111, Australia 86

Basketball Arena, London, United Kingdom
