= 2008 FIBA Stanković Continental Champions' Cup =

2008 FIBA Stanković Continental Champions Cup
4th FIBA Stanković Continental Champions Cup

Tournament details
- Host country: China
- Dates: July 17 – 21
- Teams: 4
- Venue(s): 1 (in 1 host city)

Final positions
- Champions: Angola (1st title)

Tournament statistics
- Games played: 6

The 2008 FIBA Stanković Continental Champions' Cup, or 2008 FIBA Mini World Cup, was the fourth edition of the FIBA Stanković Continental Champions' Cup tournament. It was held in Hangzhou, from July 17 to July 21.

The winner of the tournament was Angola.

== Participating teams ==
- Angola (FIBA Africa Champions) {played with the Olympic team}
- China (host team) {played with the Olympic team}
- Russia (FIBA Europe Champions) {played with a youth team}
- Serbia (Junior World Champions)

Teams played a round-robin tournament.

== Results ==
17 Jul – China – Serbia 96:72

17 Jul – Angola – Russia – 89:70

19 Jul – Serbia – Russia 99:85

19 Jul – Angola – China 72:71

20 Jul – Angola – Serbia 68:60

21 Jul – China – Russia 72:50

== Final standings ==
Angola (3–0)

China (2–1)

Serbia (1–2)

4th Russia (0–3)
