= Ümit Sonkol =

Turkish basketball player

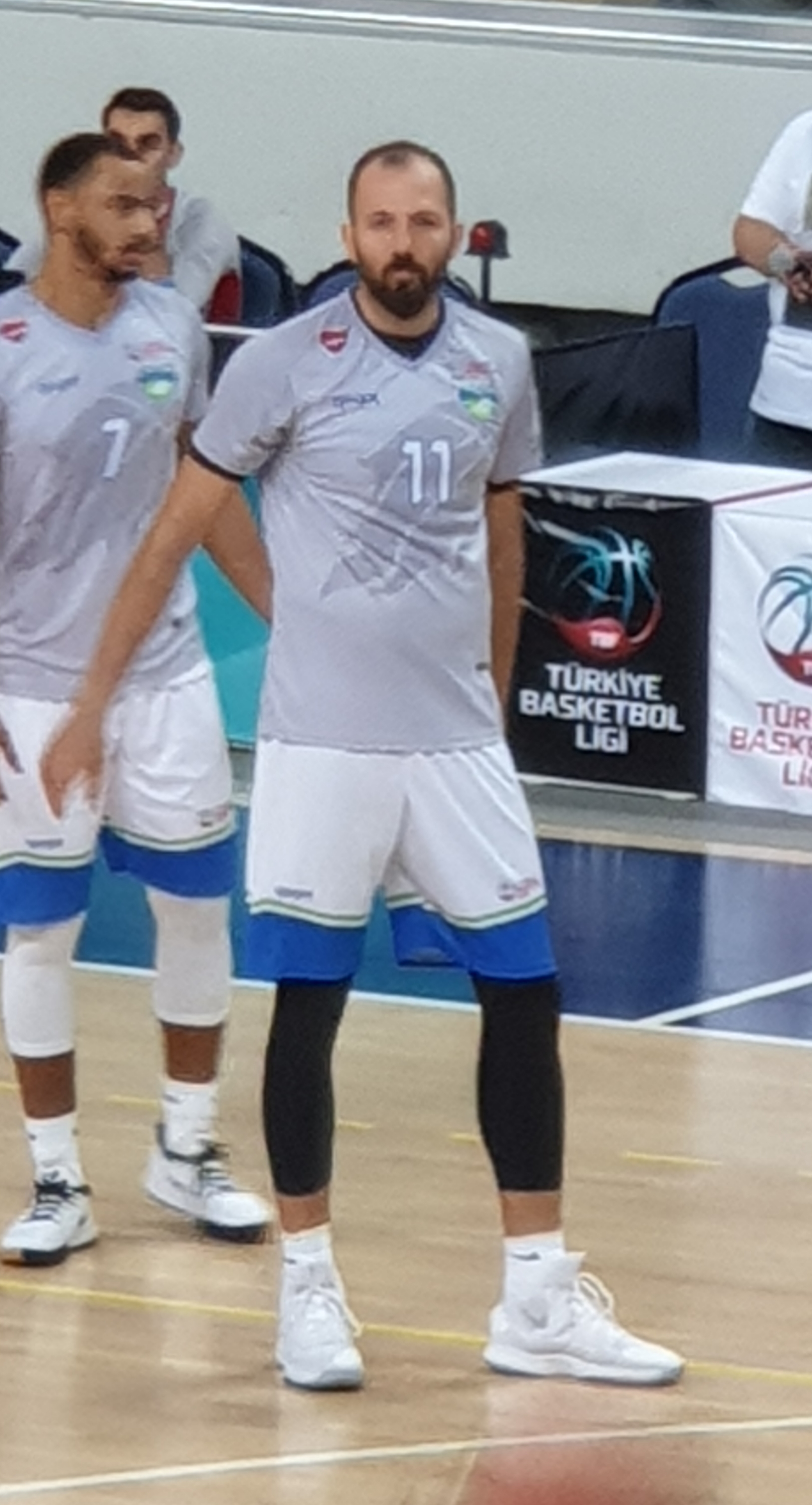

No. 4 – Balıkesir BŞB
- Position: Power forward
- League: TBL

Personal information
- Born: July 24, 1982 (age 44) Konya, Turkey
- Listed height: 6 ft 9 in (2.06 m)
- Listed weight: 225 lb (102 kg)

Career information
- Playing career: 2000–present

Career history
- 2000–2003: Balıkesir DSİ
- 2003–2004: Aras ITU
- 2004–2006: Pınar Karşıyaka
- 2006–2007: Mersin BB
- 2007–2008: Banvit
- 2008–2009: Mersin BB
- 2009–2010: Türk Telekom
- 2010–2011: Bornova Belediye
- 2011–2012: Aliağa Petkim
- 2012–2013: Pınar Karşıyaka
- 2013–2015: Türk Telekom
- 2015–2016: Tofaş
- 2016–2017: Best Balıkesir
- 2017: Petkim Spor
- 2017–2018: Bahçeşehir Koleji
- 2018–2019: Karesispor
- 2019–2022: Merkezefendi Bld. Denizli Basket
- 2022: Balıkesir BŞB
- 2023–2024: Karşıyaka Belediyesi
- 2024–present: Balıkesir BŞB

Ümit Sonkol (born July 24, 1982) is a Turkish professional basketball player for. He is playing the power forward position.

== Personal life ==
He has mechanical engineering degrees after finishing Balıkesir University, Faculty of Engineering and Architecture.
