= Yunus Çankaya =

Turkish basketball player (born 1985)

No. 15 – Gaziantep Basketbol
- Position: Small forward
- League: Turkish Basketball League

Personal information
- Born: February 23, 1985 (age 41) Istanbul, Turkey
- Listed height: 6 ft 6 in (1.98 m)
- Listed weight: 200 lb (91 kg)

Career information
- NBA draft: 2007: undrafted
- Playing career: 2005–present

Career history
- 2005–2006: Tekelspor
- 2006–2007: Selçuk Üniversitesi
- 2007–2010: Banvit
- 2010–2011: Türk Telekom
- 2011: Radnički Kragujevac
- 2011–2012: Erdemirspor
- 2012–2013: Royal Halı Gaziantep
- 2013–2016: Yeşilgiresun Belediye
- 2016–2017: Bursaspor
- 2017–2018: Selçuklu Belediyesi
- 2018–present: Gaziantep
Medals
Men's basketball
Representing Turkey
Mediterranean Games
| Bronze medal – third place | 2009 Pescara | Team competition |

Yunus Çankaya (born February 23, 1985) is a Turkish professional basketball player for Gaziantep Basketbol of the Turkish Basketball League. He can play at the small forward position.
