= Liuzhou Sports Centre =

Sports venue in Liuzhou, China

Coordinates: 39°56′43.85″N 116°31′13.16″E

The Liuzhou Sports Centre Stadium (Simplified Chinese: 柳州体育中心) at the Liuzhou Sports Centre is a multi-purpose stadium in Liuzhou, China. It is currently used mostly for football and basketball matches. The stadium has a capacity of 35,000.
