= Jacob Holt =

Jacob Holt may refer to:

- Jacob Holt (basketball) (born 2003), Canadian-Australian basketball player
- Jacob W. Holt (1811–1880), American carpenter and builder

== See also ==
- Jacob Holdt (born 1947), Danish photographer
