= Sun Yue (basketball) =

Chinese basketball player (born 1985)

Sun Yue 孙悦
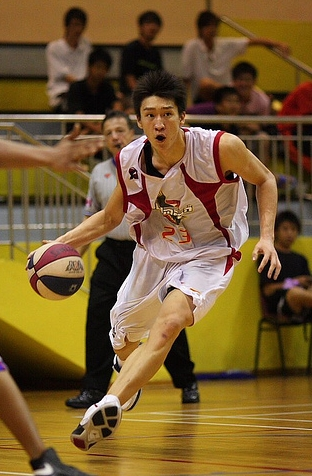
- Sun with the Beijing Olympians in 2008

Personal information
- Born: 6 November 1985 (age 41) Cangzhou, Hebei, China
- Listed height: 6 ft 9 in (2.06 m)
- Listed weight: 215 lb (98 kg)

Career information
- NBA draft: 2007: 2nd round, 40th overall pick
- Drafted by: Los Angeles Lakers
- Playing career: 2002–2021
- Position: Shooting guard / small forward
- Number: 23, 9

Career history
- 2002–2008: Beijing Olympians
- 2008–2009: Los Angeles Lakers
- 2008–2009: →Los Angeles D-Fenders
- 2009–2013: Beijing Olympians
- 2013–2017: Beijing Ducks
- 2019–2021: Beijing Royal Fighters

Career highlights
- NBA champion (2009); 2× CBA champion (2014, 2015); 2× ABA All Star-Game (2006, 2007)
- Stats at NBA.com
- Stats at Basketball Reference
Medals
Men's basketball
Representing China
FIBA Asia Cup
Gold medal – first place	2005 Doha
Silver medal – second place	2009 Tianjin
Gold medal – first place	2011 Wuhan
Asian Games
Gold medal – first place	2006 Doha
Gold medal – first place	2010 Guangzhou
East Asian Games
Bronze medal – third place	2005 Macau

Sun Yue (simplified Chinese: 孙悦; traditional Chinese: 孫悅; pinyin: Sūn Yuè [swə́n yɤ̂]; born November 6, 1985) is a Chinese former professional basketball player. He won an NBA championship with the Los Angeles Lakers in 2009, making him one of two players born in China to win an NBA championship, the other being Mongolian-Chinese center Mengke Bateer, who won the 2003 NBA Finals with the San Antonio Spurs.

== Professional career ==
=== Beijing Olympians (2002–2008) ===
Sun Yue signed his first professional contract with Chinese Basketball Association side Beijing Olympians in 2002 at the age of 17. In 2004, Sun was selected to the Chinese national under-20 team, but when Beijing refused to release him to play, the team was banned from playing in the Chinese Basketball Association. After touring in Taiwan, the team moved to play in the American Basketball Association. In Sun's first season in the American Basketball Association, he scored 9.5 points per game and seven rebounds per game with 6.7 assists per game. Sun also had his first triple-double of his career with 12 points, 12 rebounds, and 14 assists and was named to the All-ABA second team. In the following season, Sun improved his numbers, making the All-ABA first team with 13.5 points per game and six rebounds per game with 10.5 assists per game.

=== Los Angeles Lakers (2008–2009) ===
After originally entering the 2006 NBA draft but subsequently withdrawing, Sun decided to enter the 2007 NBA draft and was taken by the Los Angeles Lakers as the 40th overall pick. With Sun being drafted alongside Yi Jianlian that year, it marked the first time in NBA draft history that two China-born players were drafted in the same year. That feat would not be repeated until 2016. It would also be the first time in modern NBA history that a Chinese basketball player would be drafted outside of the CBA. However, Sun stayed with the Beijing Olympians for another year before signing with Los Angeles in August 2008.

Only a few days after his arrival in the United States, Sun suffered from a bout with mononucleosis and had to be hospitalized. After recovering from his illness, Sun finally made his debut on 7 December 2008 against the Milwaukee Bucks, scoring four points in five minutes of play.

Sun played in a total of ten regular season games and averaged 2.8 minutes and 0.6 points per game before being assigned to the Lakers' D-League affiliate, the Los Angeles D-Fenders. He played six games with the team, averaging 0.7 points and 0.2 assists per game. Sun then suffered a left ankle sprain during practice with the D-Fenders and missed the remaining D-League games.

Sun eventually recovered and traveled with the Lakers as a member of their playoff roster, but he was not activated. Since he was a member of the team when the Lakers ultimately won their championship, he did receive a ring and was crowned as an NBA champion. He is the first ethnic Chinese player to win an NBA championship. Following the death of Kobe Bryant in 2020, Sun posted a tribute to Bryant on his Weibo account, writing: "After I came to the Lakers, I was lucky to be your teammate. This is the dream of many people."

Sun was waived by Los Angeles on 31 July 2009.

=== Return to the Olympians (2009–2013) ===
Sun joined the New York Knicks, but was waived on 7 October 2009, before the next season started, due to a stress fracture in his knee. He did not play for two seasons until returning to the CBA in the 2013–14 season, where he yet again played for the Beijing Olympians.

=== Beijing Ducks (2013–2017) ===
After playing several more seasons with the Beijing Olympians (remaining with the club until its eventual disbanding in 2013), Sun then signed with the Beijing Ducks of the Chinese Basketball Association in 2013. He played a vital role in helping Beijing win their second CBA championship title during the 2013–14 season. Not only that, but he also provided a useful role in helping Beijing repeat as champions a year later.

=== Beijing Royal Fighters (2019–2021) ===
Sun joined the Beijing Royal Fighters in 2019. In October 2021, he retired at age 35.

== National team career ==
Sun competed in the NBA Summer League with the Chinese national basketball team in the summer of 2007. This was seen as a chance for the Chinese national team to gain further experience against international competition in preparation for the 2008 Summer Olympics, which Sun would also compete in. He also participated in the 2007 Stanković Continental Champions' Cup and played a vital role in the wins against Venezuela and New Zealand. Sun earned a silver medal in the 2009 FIBA Asia Championship after China finished as runners-up in the tournament. He earned a gold medal in the 2011 FIBA Asia Championship as his side won against Jordan.

== Personal life ==
According to Chinese media Baidu Sports, Sun presented his NBA championship ring to his girlfriend Chen Lu when he proposed. According to the Chinese model, Sun "sees the ring as his highest honour and most prized possession".

== Legacy ==
Sun is one of only three players to win a championship in both the NBA and the CBA; the other players to accomplish such a feat are Mengke Bateer and Eric Moreland.

== Career statistics ==
=== CBA statistics ===
Year	Team	GP	RPG	APG	FG%	FT%	PPG
2013–14	Beijing	49	5.1	4.0	.456	.721	13.7
2014–15	Beijing	49	3.9	3.7	.480	.846	11.1
2015–16	Beijing	35	4.5	2.8	.416	.811	10.8
2016–17	Beijing	36	4.9	2.8	.377	.600	7.9
Career		169	4.6	3.3	.432	.745	10.9

=== NBA statistics ===
Legend
GP	Games played	GS	Games started	MPG	Minutes per game
FG%	Field goal percentage	3P%	3-point field goal percentage	FT%	Free throw percentage
RPG	Rebounds per game	APG	Assists per game	SPG	Steals per game
BPG	Blocks per game	PPG	Points per game	**Bold**	Career high
†	Won an NBA championship

==== Regular season ====
Year	Team	GP	GS	MPG	FG%	3P%	FT%	RPG	APG	SPG	BPG	PPG
2008–09†	L.A. Lakers	10	0	2.8	.273	.000	.000	.0	.2	.1	.1	0.6
Career		10	0	2.8	.273	.000	.000	.0	.2	.1	.1	0.6
