= FIBA Stanković Continental Champions' Cup =

International basketball event in China

- Sport: Basketball
- Founded: 2005; 21 years ago
- First season: 2005
- No. of teams: 4
- Country: FIBA member nations
- Continent: FIBA (world)
- Most recent champion: Croatia (2nd title)
- Most titles: Slovenia; Angola; Australia; New Zealand; Croatia (2 titles each)
- Related competitions: William Jones Cup
- Website: 2018 Stanković Cup (in Chinese)

The FIBA Stanković Continental Champions' Cup, also known as FIBA Borislav Stanković World Cup and FIBA Mini Basketball World Cup, was an international tournament of basketball for men's national teams. It was held annually by the International Basketball Federation (FIBA). The tournament was organized in order to help promote the growth of the sport of basketball in the country of China. The first two editions of the tournament, the 2005 Stanković Cup and the 2006 Stanković Cup, were true World Cup competitions, as they included the champions of the various FIBA regional zones.

== History ==
The original idea for the FIBA Stanković World Cup came from Dr. Carl Men Ky Ching, the then-President of FIBA Asia. The purpose of the competition was to honor Serbian basketball legend Borislav Stanković, the then-FIBA Secretary General Emeritus, for his significant contributions to the world of basketball. Being the only Chinese President of the 28 International Sports Federations, Dr. Ching selected China as the host country for the competition.

Originally, beginning with the Stanković World Cup's inaugural 2005 edition, the competition provided an opportunity for the senior Chinese men's national basketball team to compete against high level national teams from all around the world, as it featured the continental champions of the various FIBA zone regions. High level national teams continued in the competition for the following 2006 edition and 2007 edition.

However, starting with the 2008 edition of the tournament, some of the national teams began sending youth squad selections to the tournament. While starting with the tournament's 2013 edition, the tournament became a lower level tournament in general, with it often featuring teams composed primarily of youth players.

== Summary ==
Year	Host city	Gold medal	Silver medal	Bronze medal
2005; Details	(China); Beijing	Lithuania	Argentina	Australia
2006; Details	(China); Nanjing/Kunshan	Greece	Germany	France
2007; Details	(China) Guangzhou; Macau	Slovenia	China	(United States); NBA D-League Ambassadors
2008; Details	(China); Hangzhou	Angola	China	Serbia
2009; Details	(China); Kunshan	Australia	Turkey	China
2010; Details	(China); Liuzhou	Slovenia	Australia	China
2011 (1); Details	(China); Haining	Angola	Australia	Russia
2011 (2); Details	(China); Guangzhou	New Zealand	Russia	China
2012; Details	(China); Guangzhou	China	Australia	Tunisia
2013 (1); Details	(China); Lanzhou	Australia University	Argentina	China Olympic
2013 (2); Details	(China); Guangzhou	Argentina	China	Nigeria
2014; Details	(China); Luoyang	Russia B	Slovenia	China
2015; Details	(China); Qingyuan	New Zealand	Mexico	Venezuela B
2016; Details	(China); Beijing	France B	Argentina Youth	Nigeria
2017; Details	(China); Shenzhen	Germany B	Croatia B	China Red
2018; Details	(China); Shenzhen	Croatia B	Tunisia	China Blue
2019; Details	(China); Shenzhen	Croatia B	China	Tunisia

== Participation details ==
Team	(China) 2005	(China) 2006	(China) (Macau) 2007	(China) 2008	(China) 2009	(China) 2010	(China) 2011 (1)	(China) 2011 (2)	(China) 2012	(China) 2013 (1)	(China) 2013 (2)	(China) 2014	(China) 2015	(China) 2016	(China) 2017	(China) 2018	(China) 2019	Total
Angola	5th		4th	1st	4th		1st	4th				4th						7
Argentina	2nd									2nd	1st			2nd				4
Australia	3rd	6th			1st	2nd	2nd		2nd	1st								7
Brazil		4th																1
China	4th	5th	2nd	2nd	3rd	3rd	4th	3rd	1st	3rd	2nd	3rd	4th	4th	3rd	3rd	2nd	17
Croatia															2nd	1st	1st	3
Egypt															4th			1
Finland																4th		1
France		3rd												1st				2
Germany		2nd								5th					1st			3
Greece		1st																1
Iran						4th												1
Latvia																	4th	1
Lithuania	1st																	1
Mexico													2nd					1
New Zealand			5th					1st					1st					3
Nigeria										6th	3rd			3rd				3
Puerto Rico	6th									4th	4th							3
Russia				4th			3rd	2nd	4th			1st						5
Serbia				3rd														1
Slovenia			1st			1st						2nd						3
Tunisia									3rd							2nd	3rd	3
Turkey					2nd													1
United States			3rd															1
Venezuela			6th										3rd					2
