= 2007 FIBA Stanković Continental Champions' Cup =

2007 FIBA Stanković Continental Champions Cup
3rd FIBA Stanković Continental Champions Cup

Tournament details
- Host country: China
- Dates: July 28 – August 2
- Teams: 6
- Venue(s): 2 (in 2 host cities)

Final positions
- Champions: Slovenia (1st title)

Tournament statistics
- Games played: 15

The 2007 FIBA Stanković Continental Champions' Cup, or 2007 FIBA Mini World Cup, was the third edition of the FIBA Stanković Continental Champions' Cup tournament of basketball. It was held in Guangzhou and Macau from July 28 to August 2.

== Participating teams ==
The following teams played in a round-robin tournament:

- Angola (FIBA Africa Champion)
- China (FIBA Asia Champions) (host)
- New Zealand (FIBA Oceania Championship representative)
- Slovenia (FIBA Europe EuroBasket 2005 representative)
- (United States) USA (2005 FIBA Americas Championship representative) (represented by the NBA D-League Ambassadors)
- Venezuela (2005 FIBA Americas Championship representative)

== Results ==
28 Jul – Angola – New Zealand 67:55

28 Jul – China – Venezuela 64:62

28 Jul – Slovenia – (United States) USA 94:86

29 Jul – Angola – Venezuela 94:54

29 Jul – Slovenia – China 80:76

29 Jul – (United States) USA – New Zealand 87:84

31 Jul – Angola – China 68:63

31 Jul – New Zealand – Slovenia 74:72

31 Jul – (United States) USA – Venezuela 89:80

1 Aug – China – New Zealand 93:63

1 Aug – Slovenia – Venezuela 88:68

1 Aug – (United States) USA – Angola 85:72

2 Aug – China – (United States) USA 82:67

2 Aug – New Zealand – Venezuela 76:73

2 Aug – Slovenia – Angola 78:51

== Final standings ==
- Slovenia (4-1)
- China (3-2)
- (United States) USA (3-2)
- 4th Angola (3-2)
- 5th New Zealand (2-3)
- 6th Venezuela (0-5)
