= London Prepares series =

London Prepares series logo

London Prepares series is the banner under which the test events for the 2012 Summer Olympic and Paralympic Games were held. The events which make up the series took place in 2011 and 2012.

== Purpose ==
The test events focussed primarily on the testing of the field of play, results, scoring and timing systems, as well as key operational procedures and functions.

The programme was made up of three different types of events, namely:

- International invitational events, created and delivered by LOCOG (such as basketball, handball and volleyball)
- International Federation (IF) events, delivered by LOCOG in partnership with IFs and national governing bodies (for example the UKA 20 km Race Walking Championships)
- International events organised by national governing bodies and other organisations, with LOCOG testing operational aspects (for example World Badminton Championships and the London round of the triathlon world series and Wimbledon)

== Ticketing ==
Unlike the tickets for the Olympics themselves, which were distributed via a ballot, tickets for the London Prepares events were sold on a first-come first-served basis. As part of their Olympic sponsorship, only Visa cards were accepted.

Additionally, some tickets were offered for free to local residents.

== Reception ==
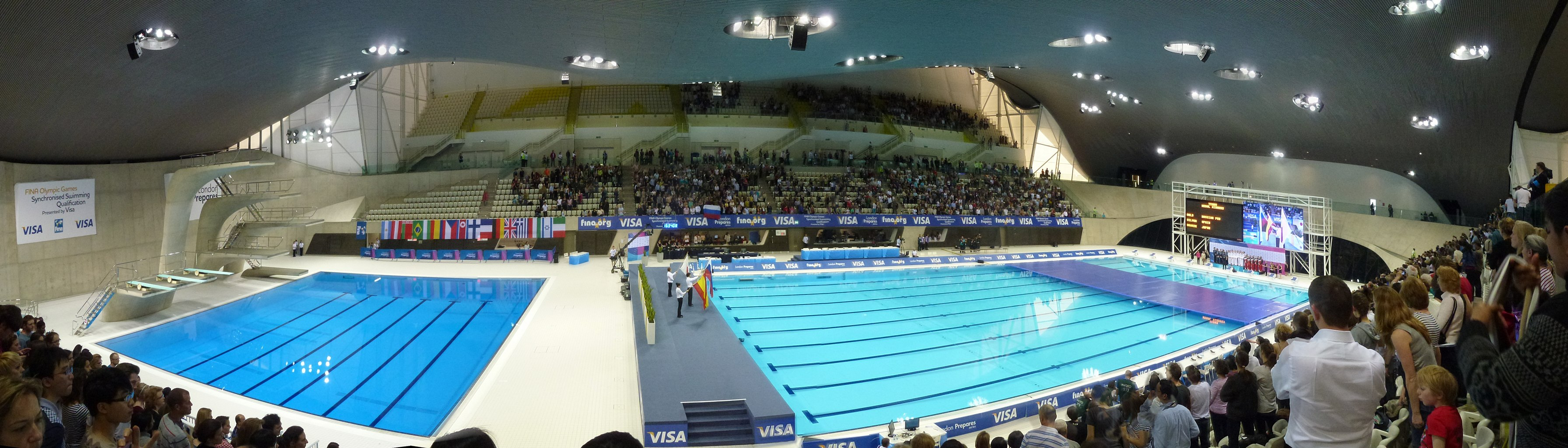
Stitched panorama of the interior of the London Aquatics Centre during a London Prepares synchronised swimming event

British equestrian athlete William Fox-Pitt praised Greenwich Park as the equestrian venue in July 2011: "I've been here a few times when it has been empty to get a feel for the place, and when you walk in, you just go 'wow'. It has an Olympic feel already, and this is just the test event."

However, there was criticism of the London–Surrey Cycle Classic on 14 August 2011, due to road closures causing delays for motorists in the area.

Following the IOC visit in October 2011, IOC Coordination Commission Chairman Denis Oswald said "We have once again been impressed by the overall level of planning and by the results of the first group of test events that were held this summer."

In January 2012, LOCOG stated that the gymnastics test event at the North Greenwich Arena "went well as workforce delivered the competition in a pre-existing venue and gymnastics technology including timing, scoring and results were tested and performed well. The transition of apparatus on the field of play between disciplines was also successful."

== Test events ==
Date	Sport	Competition	Venue
30 May 2011	Athletics – Marathon	BUPA London 10,000	The Mall & London roads
30 May 2011	Athletics – Walking	2011 UKA 20km Race Walking Championships	The Mall & London roads
20 June – 3 July 2011	Tennis	2011 Wimbledon Championships	All England Club
4–6 July 2011	Equestrian	Greenwich Park Eventing International	Greenwich Park
9–10 July 2011	Modern Pentathlon	2011 UIPM World Cup Final	Greenwich Park / Crystal Palace
20–24 July 2011	Volleyball	London Prepares International Invitational	Earls Court
28–31 July 2011	Canoe Slalom	London Canoe Slalom Invitational	Lee Valley White Water Centre
31 July 2011	Cycling – Mountain Bike	Hadleigh Farm Mountain Bike International	Hadleigh Farm
31 July – 13 August 2011	Sailing	2011 Weymouth & Portland International Regatta	Weymouth and Portland
3–7 August 2011	Rowing	2011 FISA World Rowing Junior Championships	Dorney Lake
6–7 August 2011	Triathlon	Dextro Energy Triathlon ITU World Championship Series 2011 London	Hyde Park
8–14 August 2011	Badminton	2011 BWF World Badminton Championships	Wembley Arena
9–14 August 2011	Volleyball – Beach	VISA FIVB Beach Volleyball International	Horse Guards Parade
13 August 2011	Aquatics – Marathon Swimming	London 10km Marathon Swimming International	The Serpentine, Hyde Park
14 August 2011	Cycling – Road	London – Surrey Cycle Classic	Roads of London and Surrey
16–21 August 2011	Basketball	London International Basketball Invitational	Basketball Arena
19–20 August 2011	Cycling – BMX	UCI BMX Supercross World Cup 2011 London	London Velopark
1–4 September 2011	Canoe Sprint	London Canoe Sprint Invitational International Regatta	Dorney Lake
3–10 October 2011	Archery	London Archery Classic	Lord's Cricket Ground
23–27 November 2011	Handball	London Handball Cup	Copper Box
24–27 November 2011	Boxing	International Invitational	ExCel Arena
24–27 November 2011	Table Tennis	2011 ITTF Pro Tour Grand Finals	ExCel Arena
26–27 November 2011	Fencing	International Invitational	ExCel Arena
3–4 December 2011	Judo	International Invitational	ExCel Arena
3–4 December 2011	Taekwondo	International Invitational	ExCel Arena
3–4 December	Goalball	London International Invitational Women's Goalball Tournament	Copper Box
10–11 December	Wrestling	London International Invitational	ExCel Arena
10–11 December	Weightlifting	London International Invitational	ExCel Arena
10–13 January 2012	Gymnastics – Artistic	FIG 2012 Olympic Games Gymnastics Qualification tournament	North Greenwich Arena
13 January 2012	Gymnastics – Trampoline	FIG 2012 Olympic Games Gymnastics Qualification tournament	North Greenwich Arena
16–18 January 2012	Gymnastics – Rhythmic	FIG 2012 Olympic Games Gymnastics Qualification tournament	North Greenwich Arena
17–19 February 2012	Cycling – Track	2011–2012 UCI Track Cycling World Cup Classics London	London Velodrome
20–26 February 2012	Aquatics – Diving	2012 FINA Diving World Cup	London Aquatics Centre
3–10 March 2012	Aquatics – Swimming	2012 British Gas Swimming Championships	London Aquatics Centre
April 2012	Football	Men's Olympic Qualifier	City of Coventry Stadium
18–19 April 2012	Wheelchair Rugby	International Invitational	Basketball Arena
18–22 April 2012	Aquatics – Synchronised Swimming	FINA Olympic Games Synchronised Swimming Qualification Tournament	London Aquatics Centre
18–28 April 2012	Shooting	2012 ISSF World Cup	The Royal Artillery Barracks
2–6 May 2012	Hockey	London International Invitational Hockey Tournament	Hockey Centre
3–6 May 2012	Wheelchair Tennis	Eton Manor International	Eton Manor
3–6 May 2012	Aquatics – Water Polo	London Water Polo International	Water Polo Arena
4–6 May 2012	Paralympic Archery	London Paralympic Archery International	The Royal Artillery Barracks
4–7 May 2012	Athletics – Track and field	2012 British University & Colleges Sport Championships	Olympic Stadium
5–7 May 2012	Boccia	International Invitational	Basketball Arena
8 May 2012	Paralympic Athletics	2012 London Disability Grand Prix	Olympic Stadium

== Other events ==
Other events which took place, but were not designated official test event status were:

- 2011 IFDS World Championships, which took place at the Olympic and Paralympic venue in Portland
- 2009 World Artistic Gymnastics Championships which took place at the North Greenwich Arena (O2 Arena) where the event was held at the 2012 Olympics
