= 2012 United States Olympic basketball team =

2012 United States Olympic basketball team may refer to:

- 2012 United States men's Olympic basketball team
- 2012 United States women's Olympic basketball team
