= London International Basketball Invitational =

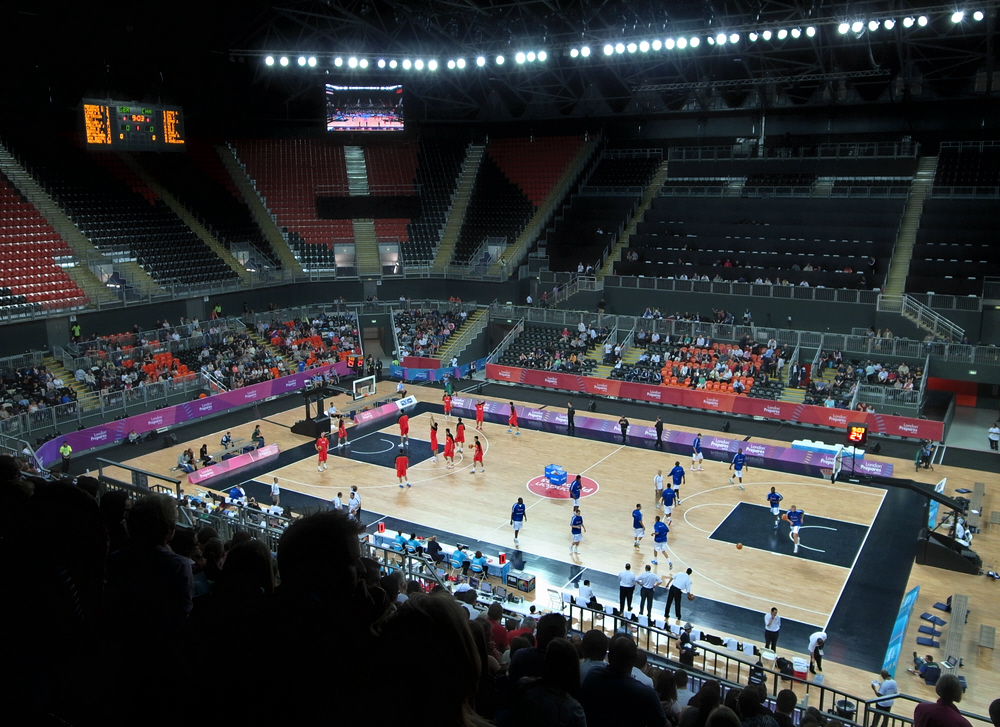
The London International Basketball Invitational

The London International Basketball Invitational was a men's basketball competition. It took place at the Basketball Arena in London and was the first event to take place in the Olympic Park. The event was part of the London Prepares series and was organised by the London Organising Committee of the Olympic Games and Paralympic Games.

The event took place between 16 and 21 August 2011 and was held in a round robin format. The tournament tested the venue's scoreboards, the playing area accreditation and catering. The competition featured six international teams: Australia, China, Croatia, France, Great Britain and Serbia. After five rounds, France were the winners after going through the competition undefeated.

== Tournament ==
The tournament was the first sporting competition to take place in the Olympic Park. The tournament took the shape of a round robin format meaning that each team played each other. The event was contested between six national men's basketball teams. The teams which competed were Australia, China, Croatia, France, hosts Great Britain and Serbia. The test event took place in the Basketball Arena. The arena is a temporary structure constructed in 2010 and 2011, situated on the north of the Olympic park. It can hold up to 12,000 people during the games and cost an estimate of £40,000,000. For the test event the venue had a capacity of 3,000. Serbia were the highest ranked team in the tournament, ranked at number 8 in the world. The tournament featured 4 other top 20 teams with Great Britain the lowest ranked at 53 in the world.

The event was part of the London Prepares series and tested the competition floors, scoreboards, accreditation and catering. The competition was run and organised by the London Organising Committee of the Olympic Games and Paralympic Games (LOCOG).

== Teams and squads ==
=== Australia ===
Australia National Basketball Team roster
Players
Coaches

Pos.	No.	Name	Age – Date of birth	Height	Club	Ctr.
PG	4	Damian Martin	26 – 5 September 1984	1.88 m (6 ft 2 in)	Perth Wildcats	(Australia)
PG	5	Patrick Mills	23 – 11 August 1988	1.83 m (6 ft 0 in)	Melbourne Tigers	(Australia)
PG	6	Adam Gibson	24 – 30 October 1986	1.88 m (6 ft 2 in)	Gold Coast Blaze	(Australia)
SF	7	Joe Ingles	23 – 2 October 1987	2.03 m (6 ft 8 in)	FC Barcelona Bàsquet	(Spain)
SG	8	Brad Newley	26 – 18 February 1985	2.01 m (6 ft 7 in)	BC Lietuvos Rytas	(Lithuania)
SG	9	Matthew Dellavedova	20 – 8 September 1990	1.93 m (6 ft 4 in)	Saint Mary's College of California	(United States)
SF	10	David Barlow	27 – 22 October 1983	2.05 m (6 ft 9 in)	CB Murcia	(Spain)
PF	11	Mark Worthington	28 – 8 June 1983	2.02 m (6 ft 8 in)	Gold Coast Blaze	(Australia)
C	12	Aron Baynes	24 – 9 December 1986	2.08 m (6 ft 10 in)	Ikaros Kallitheas B.C.	(Greece)
C	13	Andrew Ogilvy	23 – 17 June 1988	2.11 m (6 ft 11 in)	Valencia BC	(Spain)
PF	14	Matthew Nielsen	33 – 3 February 1978	2.09 m (6 ft 10 in)	BC Khimki	(Russia)
C	15	Aleks Marić	26 – 22 October 1984	2.11 m (6 ft 11 in)	Panathinaikos BC	(Greece)
PF	20	Daniel Kickert	28 – 29 May 1983	2.08 m (6 ft 10 in)	Turów Zgorzelec	(Poland)
SG	21	Peter Crawford	31 – 6 November 1979	1.93 m (6 ft 4 in)	Townsville Crocodiles	(Australia)

Head coach

- (United States) Brett Brown

Assistant coach(es)

- (Australia) Andrej Lemanis
- (Australia) Marty Clarke

Technical assistant

- (Australia) Mo Dakhil

Strength & conditioning coach

- (Australia) Bohdan Babijczuk

Legend

- (C) Team captain
- Club field describes current pro club
- Age is of 16 August 2011

=== China ===
China National Basketball Team roster
Players
Coaches

Pos.	No.	Name	Age – Date of birth	Height	Club	Ctr.
PG	06	Zhang Qingpeng	26 – 23 January 1985	1.90 m (6 ft 3 in)	Liaoning Dinosaurs	(China)
SG	07	Wang Shipeng	28 – 6 April 1983	1.98 m (6 ft 6 in)	Guangdong Southern Tigers	(China)
SF	08	Zhu Fangyu	28 – 5 January 1983	2.01 m (6 ft 7 in)	Guangdong Southern Tigers	(China)
F	09	Sun Yue	25 – 6 November 1985	2.06 m (6 ft 9 in)	Beijing Aoshen	(China)
C	10	Zhang Zhaoxu	23 – 18 November 1987	2.21 m (7 ft 3 in)	Dongfang Club	(China)
PF	11	Yi Jianlian	23 – 27 October 1987	2.12 m (6 ft 11 in)	Washington Wizards	(United States)
G	12	Yu Shulong	21 – 19 February 1990	1.85 m (6 ft 1 in)	Dongbeihu	(China)
C	13	Su Wei	22 – 28 July 1989	2.11 m (6 ft 11 in)	Guangdong Southern Tigers	(China)
PF	14	Wang Zhizhi (C)	34 – 8 July 1977	2.16 m (7 ft 1 in)	Bayi Rockets	(China)
SG	16	Zhang Bo	22 – 30 September 1988	1.97 m (6 ft 6 in)	Bayi Rockets	(China)
F	18	Yi Li	23 – 7 November 1987	2.04 m (6 ft 8 in)	Jiangsu Dragons	(China)
G	19	Zirelijiang Mugedaer	20 – 4 January 1991	1.91 m (6 ft 3 in)		(China)

Head coach

- (United States) Bob Donewald

Assistant coach

- (China) Guo Shiqiang
- (China) Fan Bing
- (China) Li Nan

Legend

- (C) Team captain
- Club field describes current pro club

=== Croatia ===
Croatian National Basketball Team roster
Players
Coaches

Pos.	No.	Name	Age – Date of birth	Height	Club	Ctr.
C	4	Ante Tomić	24 – 7 February 1987	2.18 m (7 ft 2 in)	Real Madrid Baloncesto	(Spain)
G	5	Marko Car	25 – 21 October 1985	1.88 m (6 ft 2 in)	KK Cedevita	(Croatia)
PG	6	Marko Popović	29 – 12 June 1982	1.85 m (6 ft 1 in)	Unics Kazan	(Russia)
SF	7	Bojan Bogdanović	22 – 18 April 1989	2.02 m (6 ft 8 in)	KK Cibona	(Croatia)
G	8	Rok Stipčević	25 – 25 May 1986	1.84 m (6 ft 0 in)	Cimberio Varese	(Italy)
G/F	9	Marko Tomas	26 – 3 January 1985	2.01 m (6 ft 7 in)	Fenerbahçe Ülker	(Turkey)
G	10	Dontaye Draper	27 – 10 August 1984	1.80 m (5 ft 11 in)	KK Cedevita	(Croatia)
F	11	Damir Markota	25 – 26 December 1985	2.09 m (6 ft 10 in)	Union Olimpija	(Slovenia)
G	12	Krunoslav Simon	26 – 24 June 1985	1.97 m (6 ft 6 in)	KK Zagreb	(Croatia)
F	13	Zoran Vrkić	24 – 16 August 1987	1.92 m (6 ft 4 in)	Peristeri	(Greece)
C	14	Luka Žorić	26 – 5 November 1984	2.10 m (6 ft 11 in)	KK Zagreb	(Croatia)
C	15	Lukša Andrić	26 – 29 January 1985	2.10 m (6 ft 11 in)	Galatasaray men's basketball team	(Turkey)
C	21	Stanko Barać	25 – 13 August 1986	2.17 m (7 ft 1 in)	Saski Baskonia	(Spain)

Head coach

- (Croatia) Josip Vranković

Assistant coaches

- (Croatia) Mladen Erjavec
- (Croatia) Tomislav Mijatović
- (Croatia) Luka Milanović

Legend

- Age field is age on 16 August 2011

=== France ===
French National Basketball Team roster
Players
Coaches

Pos.	No.	Name	Age – Date of birth	Height	Club	Ctr.
C	4	Joakim Noah	26 – 25 February 1985	2.11 m (6 ft 11 in)	Chicago Bulls	(United States)
F	5	Nicolas Batum	22 – 14 December 1988	2.03 m (6 ft 8 in)	Portland Trail Blazers	(United States)
G	6	Antoine Diot	22 – 17 January 1989	1.93 m (6 ft 4 in)	Le Mans Sarthe Basket	(United States)
G	7	Andrew Albicy	21 – 21 March 1990	1.78 m (5 ft 10 in)	Paris-Levallois Basket	(France)
G	9	Tony Parker	29 – 17 May 1982	1.88 m (6 ft 2 in)	San Antonio Spurs	(United States)
PF	10	Ali Traore	26 – 28 February 1985	2.05 m (6 ft 9 in)		(France)
F	11	Florent Piétrus	30 – 19 January 1981	2.02 m (6 ft 8 in)	Valencia BC	(Spain)
G	12	Nando De Colo	24 – 23 June 1987	1.96 m (6 ft 5 in)	Valencia BC	(Spain)
G	13	Boris Diaw (C)	29 – 16 April 1982	2.03 m (6 ft 8 in)	Charlotte Bobcats	(United States)
C	14	Ronny Turiaf	28 – 13 January 1983	2.06 m (6 ft 9 in)	New York Knicks	(United States)
SF	15	Mickaël Gelabale	28 – 22 May 1983	2.00 m (6 ft 7 in)	ASVEL Basket	(France)
C	17	Kevin Seraphin	21 – 7 December 1989	2.06 m (6 ft 9 in)	Washington Wizards	(United States)
SF	18	Charles Lombahe-Kahudi	25 – 19 July 1986	1.99 m (6 ft 6 in)	Le Mans Sarthe Basket	(France)

Head coach

- (France) Vincent Collet

Assistant coach(es)

- (France) Ruddy Nelhomme
- (France) Jacques Commeres

Legend

- (C) Team captain
- Club field describes current pro club
- nat field describes country
  of last club
  before the tournament
- Age field is age on 16 August 2011

=== Great Britain ===
Great Britain national basketball team roster
Players
Coaches

Pos.	No.	Name	Age – Date of birth	Height	Club	Ctr.
G	4	Ogo Adegboye	23 – 23 September 1987	1.82 m (6 ft 0 in)	St. Bonaventure University	(United States)
G	5	Andrew Lawrence	21 – 4 June 1990	1.88 m (6 ft 2 in)	College of Charleston	(United States)
G	6	Mike Lenzly	30 – 1 May 1981	1.85 m (6 ft 1 in)	CEZ Nymburk	(Czech Republic)
F	7	Laurence Ekperigin	23 – 21 February 1988	2.01 m (6 ft 7 in)	Gran Canaria	(Spain)
F	8	Andrew Sullivan	31 – 12 February 1980	2.03 m (6 ft 8 in)	Mersey Tigers	(United Kingdom)
SF	9	Luol Deng	26 – 16 April 1985	2.06 m (6 ft 9 in)	Chicago Bulls	(United States)
C	10	Robert Archibald	31 – 29 March 1980	2.11 m (6 ft 11 in)	CAI Zaragoza	(Spain)
PF	11	Joel Freeland	24 – 7 February 1987	2.08 m (6 ft 10 in)	Unicaja Málaga	(Spain)
G	12	Nate Reinking	37 – 12 December 1973	1.83 m (6 ft 0 in)	Mons – Hainaut	(Belgium)
PF	13	Daniel Clark	22 – 16 September 1988	2.08 m (6 ft 10 in)	CB Estudiantes	(Spain)
C	14	Eric Boateng	25 – 20 November 1985	2.08 m (6 ft 10 in)	Denver Nuggets	(United States)
PF	15	Matthew Bryan-Amaning	23 – 9 May 1988	2.06 m (6 ft 9 in)	Washington Huskies	(United States)
G	21	Devon van Oostrum	18 – 24 January 1993	1.89 m (6 ft 2 in)	Saski Baskonia	(Spain)
PF	22	Ryan Richards	20 – 12 April 1991	2.11 m (6 ft 11 in)	San Antonio Spurs	(United States)

Head coach

- (United States) Chris Finch

Assistant coaches

- (United States) Paul Mokeski
- (United States) Nick Nurse

Legend

- Club – describes last
  club before the tournament
- Age – describes age
  on 31 August 2011

=== Serbia ===
Serbian National Basketball Team roster
Players
Coaches

Pos.	No.	Name	Age – Date of birth	Height	Club	Ctr.
G	4	Miloš Teodosić	24 – 19 March 1987	1.96 m (6 ft 5 in)	Olympiacos	(Greece)
G	5	Milenko Tepić	24 – 27 February 1987	2.02 m (6 ft 8 in)	Panathinaikos BC	(Greece)
G	6	Aleksandar Rašić	27 – 16 March 1984	1.95 m (6 ft 5 in)	BC Lietuvos Rytas	(Lithuania)
SG	7	Ivan Paunić	24 – 27 January 1987	1.95 m (6 ft 5 in)	BC Nizhny Novgorod	(Russia)
SF	8	Nemanja Bjelica	23 – 9 May 1988	2.09 m (6 ft 10 in)	Saski Baskonia	(Spain)
PG	9	Stefan Marković	23 – 25 April 1988	1.99 m (6 ft 6 in)	Pallacanestro Treviso	(Italy)
G	10	Uroš Tripković	24 – 11 September 1986	1.98 m (6 ft 6 in)	Unicaja Malaga	(Spain)
SF	11	Marko Kešelj	23 – 2 January 1988	2.05 m (6 ft 9 in)	Olympiacos BC	(Greece)
C	12	Nenad Krstić	28 – 25 July 1983	2.14 m (7 ft 0 in)	Boston Celtics	(United States)
C	13	Kosta Perović	26 – 19 February 1985	2.18 m (7 ft 2 in)	FC Barcelona Bàsquet	(Spain)
F/C	15	Milan Mačvan	21 – 16 November 1989	2.06 m (6 ft 9 in)	Maccabi Tel Aviv B.C.	(Israel)
PF	20	Duško Savanović	27 – 5 September 1983	2.04 m (6 ft 8 in)	Valencia BC	(Spain)
C	22	Boban Marjanović	22 – 27 September 1988	2.21 m (7 ft 3 in)	PBC CSKA Moscow	(Russia)
G	23	Dragan Milosavljević	22 – 11 May 1989	1.98 m (6 ft 6 in)	KK Partizan	(Serbia)

Head coach

- (Serbia) Dušan Ivković

Assistant coaches

- (Serbia) Aleksandar Kesar
- (Serbia) Saša Nikitović

Legend

- (C) Team captain
- Club field describes current pro club

== Matches ==
The first ever international basketball game at the arena saw Australia thrash China. The Boomers without Patty Mills, Joe Ingles, Aleks Marić and Brad Newley who were all rested eased to a 28-point win. The second match saw Croatia beat rivals Serbia with Simon leading the line with 17 points. In the last game on day one, Great Britain played France. Joel Freeland topped scored for the hosts with 16 points while Tony Parker weighed in with 23 points for France. It was a scrappy match with 17 turnovers by halftime. Parker started well for France as he netted 10 points in the opening quarter. However, when he was rested in the second quarter the French team went for five minutes without scoring a basket. However, with Parker back France opened up a 12-point lead in the third quarter. Britain made mistakes in the final quarter as the French were winners by 22 points.

Serbia opened the second day with an 87–53 win over China. The second match saw France defeat Australia in a thriller. With Tony Parker the French had managed to establish a 13-point lead in third quarter. Parker scored a game high 27 points whilst Mills netted 20 for the Boomers. The final quarter witnessed Australia comeback at France and trailed by only one point with 11 seconds to go. However, Parker clinched the win for the French team. In the final match of the day world number 19 Croatia held on to beat Great Britain by five points. Strong opening and final quarters kept the hosts in the game. However, a poor second quarter saw Croatia into a 12-point lead at halftime. In the final quarter Britain started 14 points behind and climbed to within 3 points, before Lenzly and Simon sealed the win for Croatia.

Day three opened with a comfortable win for France over China, minus Tony Parker. Patty Mills led the Boomers with 20 points to defeat Croatia. Žorić top scored with 18 for Croatia who led by 5 at the end of the first quarter only to be 12 down at halftime, a gap that they never recovered from. In the final match of the day Serbia clinched victory over the hosts in the dying seconds. At halftime the teams could not be separated in 44 points each. Sullivan and Freeland hobbled off for the Brits whilst Boating top scored. Serbian captain, Nenad Krstić netted a game high 21 points as his team won with 2 seconds to spare.

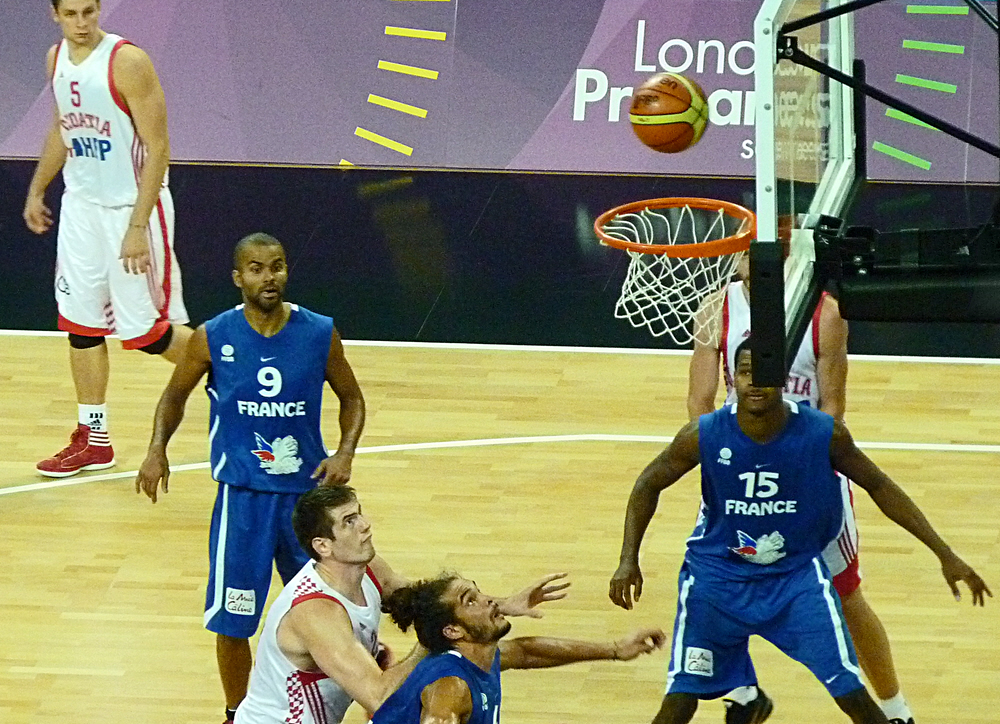
Croatia vs France during the London International Basketball Invitational

The opening match of day four saw France beat Croatia thanks to a 12-point blitz in 23 minutes from Parker. Luol Deng returned for Britain as they won their first match of the tournament defeating China. Deng who had been absent whilst running a camp for children netted 15 points for the hosts. However, he was out shone by Joel Freeland who was the MVP of the game netting 18 points. Yi netted a game high 20 points for China. Britain missing its captain Sullivan with injury managed to open a 6-point lead in the first half. However, China came within one point before Britain eased away to win their first match. In the final match of the day Australia took on Serbia. Australia turned a one-point deficit at the start of the final quarter into a nine-point win as they managed a 10-point swing. Ingles led the line for the Boomers with 17 points whilst Ogilvy snatched 10 rebounds.

On the final day Croatia beat injury deprived China, to finish in third place in the table. In the final match for Australia and Great Britain, it went to overtime as Deng top scored with 26 points. The Aussies led by four points at halftime and extended the lead to 10 in the third quarter. Britain battled back to force overtime, which they led until two free throws in the dying seconds saw the win go down under. The final match of the tournament saw France waste a 23-point lead but hang on to go undefeated throughout the week. France led by 17 points at halftime and with Serbia limiting time on court for their key men, France took advantage and went into a 23 with 4:12 left to play in the third quarter. Serbia then went route one with a 3-point barrage which saw them take the lead. France responded by sticking their starting five on to see out the match.

== Standings and results ==
Team	Pld	W	L	PF	PA	PD	Pts
France	5	5	0	392	323	+69	10
Australia	5	4	1	385	339	+46	9
Croatia	5	3	2	367	355	+12	8
Serbia	5	2	3	401	389	+12	7
Great Britain	5	1	4	379	401	−22	6
China	5	0	5	264	381	−117	5

16 August 2011
15:30

Report

Australia	71–43	China
Scoring by quarter: 17–14, 15–5, 21–13, 18–11
Pts: Daniel Kickert 15; Rebs: Damian Martin 7 Asts: Damian Martin 6		Pts: Zhang Bo 13; Rebs: Zhang Zhaoux 6 Asts: Zhang Bo 2

Basketball Arena, London

16 August 2011
18:00

Report

Serbia	71–83	Croatia
Scoring by quarter: 19–20, 17–24, 16–18, 19–21
Pts: Miloš Teodosić 18; Rebs: Nenad Krstić, Miloš Teodosić 5 Asts: Miloš Teodosić 4		Pts: Krunoslav Simon 17; Rebs: Ante Tomić 9 Asts: Rok Stipčević 3

Basketball Arena, London
Attendance: 2,037

16 August 2011
20:30

Report

Great Britain	60–82	France
Scoring by quarter: 18–20, 11–14, 19–26, 12–22
Pts: Joel Freeland 16; Rebs: Joel Freeland 8		Pts: Tony Parker 25; Rebs: Joakim Noah 12; Asts: Tony Parker 4

Basketball Arena, London
Attendance: 2,287

17 August 2011
15:30

Report

China	53–87	Serbia
Scoring by quarter: 15–22, 16–19, 11–26, 11–20
Pts: Yi Jianlian 20; Rebs: Yi Jianlian 7 Asts: Yi Jianlian 3		Pts: Miloš Teodosić 19; Rebs: Milan Mačvan 6 Asts: Milan Mačvan 5

Basketball Arena, London

17 August 2011
18:00

Report

France	71–67	Australia
Scoring by quarter: 15–11, 22–21, 19–17, 15–18
Pts: Tony Parker 27; Rebs: Tony Parker 8		Pts: Patty Mills 20; Rebs: Aleks Marić 7 Asts: Matthew Dellavedova 5

Basketball Arena, London

17 August 2011
20:30

Report

Croatia	75–70	Great Britain
Scoring by quarter: 12–18, 23–5, 28–24, 12–23
Pts: Krunoslav Simon 16; Rebs: Ante Tomić 6 Asts: Krunoslav Simon, Ante Tomić 3		Pts: Joel Freeland 22; Rebs: Joel Freeland 9 Asts: Andrew Lawrence 2

Basketball Arena, London
Attendance: 2,739

18 August 2011
15:30

Report

France	76–59	China
Scoring by quarter: 22–7, 14–15, 18–15, 22–22
Pts: Nicolas Batum 15; Rebs: Joakim Noah 9 Asts: Boris Diaw, Mickaël Gelabale, Charles Kahudi 3		Pts: Yi Jianlian 20; Rebs: Yi Jianlian, Su Wei 5 Asts: Sun Yue, Zhang Bo 2

Basketball Arena, London

18 August 2011
18:00

Report

Australia	78–66	Croatia
Scoring by quarter: 9–14, 22–5, 23–25, 24–22
Pts: Patty Mills 22; Rebs: Matt Nielsen, Andrew Ogilvy 7 Asts: Brad Newley 7		Pts: Luka Žorić 18; Rebs: Bojan Bogdanović 7 Asts: Dontaye Draper 7

Basketball Arena, London

18 August 2011
20:30

Report

Serbia	97–95	Great Britain
Scoring by quarter: 18–22, 26–22, 25–29, 28–22
Pts: Nenad Krstić 21; Rebs: Milan Mačvan 8 Asts: Milenko Tepić 5		Pts: Eric Boateng 15; Rebs: Daniel Clark 10; Asts: Ogo Adegboye 5

Basketball Arena, London
Attendance: 1,328

20 August 2011
15:30

Report

Croatia	60–83	France
Scoring by quarter: 15–17, 16–18, 10–25, 19–23
Pts: Bojan Bogdanović 16; Rebs: Bojan Bogdanović 7 Asts: Two players 3		Pts: Tony Parker 12; Rebs: Joakim Noah 9 Asts: Three players 3

Basketball Arena, London

20 August 2011
18:00

Report

Great Britain	64–56	China
Scoring by quarter: 19–12, 13–14, 14–19, 18–11
Pts: Joel Freeland 18; Rebs: Joel Freeland 13; Asts: Ogo Adegboye 3		Pts: Yi Jianlian 20; Rebs: Yi Jianlian 13; Asts: Zhang Bo 4

Basketball Arena, London

20 August 2011
20:30

Report

Serbia	69–78	Australia
Scoring by quarter: 21–23, 10–8, 19–18, 19–29
Pts: Nenad Krstić 17; Rebs: Kosta Perović 9 Asts: Miloš Teodosić 11		Pts: Joe Ingles 17; Rebs: Andrew Ogilvy 10; Asts: Joe Ingles 4

Basketball Arena, London
Attendance: 2,372

21 August 2011
15:30

Report

China	53–83	Croatia
Scoring by quarter: 12–17, 19–18, 14–26, 8–22
Pts: Yi Jianlian 17; Rebs: Zhang Zhaoxu 8 Asts: Sun Yue 4		Pts: Bojan Bogdanović 16; Rebs: Ante Tomić 8 Asts: Ante Tomić 6

Basketball Arena, London

21 August 2011
18:00

Report

Australia	91–90 (OT)	Great Britain
Scoring by quarter: 21–15, 18–20, 23–24, 18–21, Overtime: 11–10
Pts: Brad Newley 23; Rebs: Damien Martin 8 Asts: Adam Gibson 5		Pts: Luol Deng 26; Rebs: Luol Deng 9 Asts: Devan van Oostrum 5

Basketball Arena, London

21 August 2011
20:30

Report

France	80–77	Serbia
Scoring by quarter: 25–18, 23–13, 20–18, 12–28
Pts: Tony Parker 24; Rebs: Tony Parker 6 Asts: Tony Parker 3		Pts: Kosta Perović 14; Rebs: Three players 6 Asts: Miloš Teodosić 8

Basketball Arena, London
Attendance: 2,437

== Reaction ==
Joanna Sutherland, London 2012 Competition Manager for Basketball was pleased with the volunteers saying that they had been enthusiastic and keen. Great Britain captain Drew Sullivan said that it was a shame that the venue was only temporary. While Patrick Mills said the atmosphere was good and the venue was nice. FIBA Secretary-General and International Olympic Committee (IOC) member Patrick Baumann, agreed with Sullivan about the venue being temporary, but he also said it was amazing what had happened in this part of London.
