= London Canoe Slalom Invitational =

The London Canoe Slalom Invitational was an international Canoe Slalom event held at the Lee Valley White Water Centre between July 28 and 31 2011. The Regatta was closed to the media and public. It was a 2012 Olympics test event and was part of the London Prepares series

== Results ==
Event	Gold	Silver	Bronze
K1 Men	Vavřinec Hradilek (CZE)	Peter Kauzer (SLO)	Fabien Lefèvre (FRA)
C1 Men	Michal Martikán (SVK)	Jan Benzien (GER)	Denis Gargaud Chanut (FRA)
C2 Men	Pavol Hochschorner (SVK); Peter Hochschorner (SVK)	Ladislav Škantár (SVK); Peter Škantár (SVK)	Marcus Becker (GER); Stefan Henze (GER)
K1 Women	Melanie Pfeifer (GER)	Kateřina Kudějová (CZE)	Urša Kragelj (SLO)
