= 2011 Weymouth & Portland International Regatta =

The Weymouth & Portland International Regatta 2011 was the sailing test event for the 2012 Summer Olympics and was part of the London Prepares series. It was held at the National Sailing Academy between the 31 July and 13 August 2011.

== Venue ==
The regatta took place at the Weymouth and Portland National Sailing Academy (WPNSA) in Osprey Quey, Portland

== Classes ==
All of the Olympic classes raced at the regatta and will followed the rules of the Olympics, of one boat per a nation in each class.

=== Elliott ===
The Elliot class is a match racing boat for women it is held in a round robin format. The regatta featured twelve teams from Australia, Denmark, Finland, France, Great Britain, Germany, the Netherlands, Portugal, Russia, Spain, Sweden and USA. On the opening day of competition competitors experienced light winds. Finland, Russia and Sweden after the opening day all had one hundred percent records. On the second day the class experienced light winds again as Russia maintained their winning streak. Whilst Finland improved to a 7–1 win loss record with their only defeat coming from the Russians. Hosts Great Britain only won one race on day one, won all four on day two to move back into contention for the quarterfinals. While Australia, Germany, Portugal and Spain were all set to exit the competition in the round robin phase after day two. On the final day Great Britain and the Netherlands won all four of their races to improve to a 7–3 record and move into the knockout stages. While Russia finally lost as they lost twice. Russia still go into the quarterfinals ranked number one despite losses to the US and France who also join them. Sweden and Australia also advanced to the quarterfinals. The draw for the quarterfinals saw Russia take on Australia, Finland against Sweden, the Netherlands face the US, and Great Britain against France.

In the battle for the minor places, Australia defeated Great Britain 3–2 while the Netherlands defeated Sweden 3–0 to advance to the 5/6 place race. While Australia and Britain go into the 7/8 place race. However, due to light winds only one set of races was complete on the 8 August with Australia and Great Britain winning. The weather played havoc again and they were unable to complete the rest of the races, meaning that Britain finished seventh and Australia fifth. In the semi-finals Finland defeated the USA 3–0, while Russia went 2–0 up only to see France level and force a decider. In the decider the French forced the Russian boat to the right side of the course, only for Russia to round the mark first and finish four lengths clear. In the bronze medal match France defeated America 2–0. In the final Finland defeated Russia to claim the gold medal at the regatta.

=== Finn ===
Races three and four were dominated by Postma. The Dutchman won the first race by 52 seconds and the second by 16 Weymouth Bay West course to move into third. Ainslie and Lobert continued to occupy the first two positions. Lobert moved into second place overall after he and Ainsile won race five and six. The Frenchman was just one point ahead of Postma. Race seven and eight were split by Ainslie and Postma. Ainslie won the first race by a huge margin of 51 seconds before coming in second behind Posma to lead the Dutchman by 7 points. On the penultimate day of racing Ainslie won the class as he finished the day 19 points ahead of Jan Postma. Ainslie won the opening race of the day with Jan Postma in second. After race nine the Dutchman trailed the Briton by eight points. In race 10 Ainslie inflicted a penalty on his rival before the start of the race. Ainslie match raced his rival as they both started behind the rest of the fleet. The Brit then made his way through the field taking the lead in the final 300 metres whilst Postma finished in a lowly 15 place, sealing the regatta for the Brit. In the medal race, Ainslie completed his week by winning it. Postma finished eighth and dropped to third overall as Frenchman Lobert finished third in the race.

== Results ==
Event	Winner	Second	Third
Elliott 6m – Women's Match Racing	Finland	Russia	United States
RS:X – Men's Windsurfer	Dorian van Rijsselberghe (NED)	Nick Dempsey (GBR)	Przemysław Miarczyński (POL)
RS:X – Women's Windsurfer	Zofia Noceti-Klepacka (POL)	Marina Alabau (ESP)	Bryony Shaw (GBR)
Laser	Tom Slingsby (AUS)	Rutger van Schaardenburg (NED)	Paul Goodison (GBR)
Laser Radial	Marit Bouwmeester (NED)	Evi Van Acker (BEL)	Paige Railey (USA)
470 Men	France	Australia	Israel
470 Women	Japan	Great Britain	Netherlands
Finn	Ben Ainslie (GBR)	Jonathan Lobert (FRA)	Pieter-Jan Postma (NED)
Star	Brazil	Great Britain	Poland
49er	Australia	Spain	New Zealand
