= Hadleigh Farm Mountain Bike International =

Race details
- Date: 31 July 2011
- Region: London, England
- Discipline: Mountain
- Organiser: London Organising Committee of the Olympic Games and Paralympic Games & Union Cycliste Internationale
- Web site: www.londonpreparesseries.com/mountainbike

The Hadleigh Farm Mountain Bike International was a one off, mountain bike race, which acted as the test event for the 2012 Summer Olympics. The race was part of the London Prepares series of events. Catharine Pendrel and Julien Absalon won the races.

== Route ==
The race took place over a 5.1 km course at Hadleigh Farm. The course took in farmland owned by The Salvation Army and the adjacent Country Park. The winners of the race received a prize of £4,000. The course was constructed between July 2010 and March 2011. The course contains 500 tonnes of rock and 3,500 tonnes of crushed stone. British rider Liam Killeen said "it's a challenging course that will bring out the best in everyone." Sections of the course have been named by local children. Sections of the circuit will be known by names such as Rabbit Hole, Leap of Faith, Deanes Drop and The Breathtaker. The course is 5 km in length and features six prominent climbs and several smaller ones which mean that the riders climb for a total of 170 metres each lap. There are a number of rock gardens drop-offs constructed from imported Derbyshire gritstone. The circuit is set in open meadows meaning a lack of trees makes it perfect for the spectators to see what is happening. There are several challenging sections with two lines, with the less challenging line taking longer to navigate, as the riders lap the course eight times.

== Riders ==
Riders from 25 nations entered the event. Headlining the field was reigning Olympic Champions, Julien Absalon and Sabine Spitz.

== Races ==
=== Men ===
Julien Absalon led from start to finish. The Frenchman had opened up a gap of 20 seconds by the end of the first lap. The chase pack was led by Jaroslav Kulhavý, Christoph Sauser and Karl Markt. The world cup leader, Kulhavy faded and was passed by Jeremiah Bishop for fifth place. The double Olympic champion went on to finish a minute 26 ahead of Christoph Sauser and a further 26 seconds in front of Karl Markt.

=== Women ===
World Cup points leader Julie Bresset started strongly as she led after the first lap. Bresset was joined at the front by Catharine Pendrel and later in the first lap by Georgia Gould. However the Frenchwoman soon faded after four laps and finished third. While Eva Lechner and Nathalie Schneitter from Switzerland battled with each other for fourth place during the first four laps. Elisabeth Osl was close behind the pair of them and eventually the Austrian passed the pair and went on to finish fourth. At the front, World number one Pendrel and Gould were separated by three seconds at the start of the final lap. However Gould wiped herself out of contention for the win when she crashed on the 'Leap of Faith' drop after touching wheels with the Canadian. Pendrel won the race by almost a minute ahead of Gould and Bresset.

== Results ==
=== Men ===
Position	Rider	Time
1	Julien Absalon (FRA)	1:31:48
2	Christoph Sauser (SUI)	+1:20
3	Karl Markt (GER)	+1:46
4	Jeremiah Bishop (USA)	+2:19
5	Jaroslav Kulhavý (CZE)	+2:33
6	Kohei Yamamoto (JPN)	+3:27
7	Maxime Marotte (FRA)	+4:38
8	Magnus Darvell (SWE)	+4:58
9	Uwe Hochenwarter (AUT)	+5:14
10	Rubens Valeriano (BRA)	+5:46

=== Women ===
Position	Rider	Time
1	Catharine Pendrel (CAN)	1:32:04
2	Georgia Gould (USA)	+0:56
3	Julie Bresset (FRA)	+1:32
4	Elisabeth Osl (AUT)	+3:40
5	Eva Lechner (ITA)	+3:51
6	Nathalie Schneitter (SUI)	+4:00
7	Alexandra Engen (SWE)	+4:29
8	Sabine Spitz (GER)	+5:00
9	Shi Qinglan (CHN)	+5:32
10	Esther Suess (SUI)	+6:24

== Reaction ==
Riders complained that the course was too narrow and too difficult to pass. The course had been criticised for being too flat but after the test event several riders stated that it was technically and physically difficult, with British rider Maxine Filby saying "There has been unfounded criticism of the course but it is a hard course."

LOCOG director of sport Debbie Jevans said that the event had been incredibly successful. However changes such as adding an extra lap, making the course wider in places and slowing the track down were some of the suggestions posed to the organisers.
