= Joe Ingles =

Australian basketball player (born 1987)

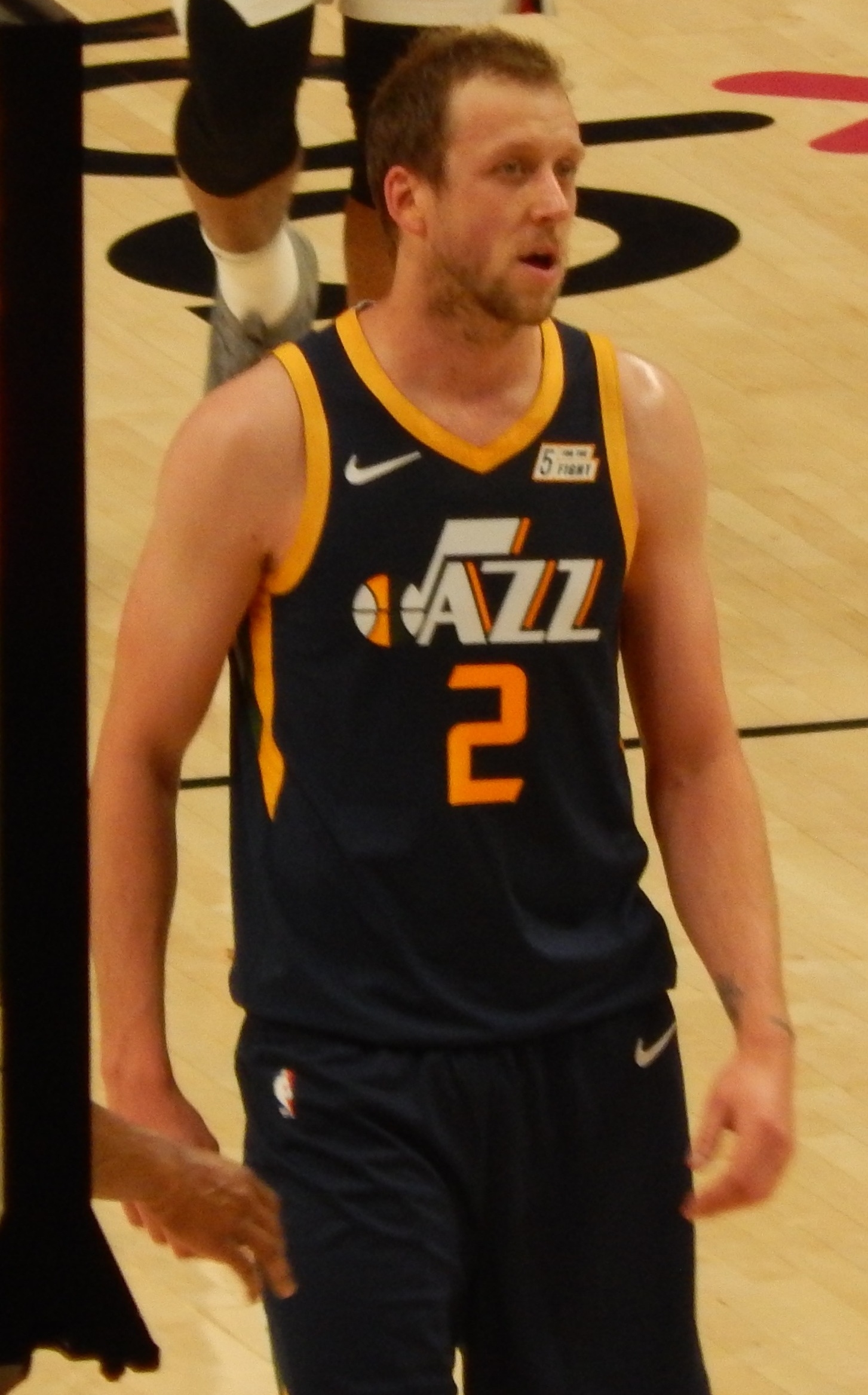
- Ingles with the Utah Jazz in 2018

No. 7 – Melbourne United
- Position: Small forward
- League: NBL

Personal information
- Born: 2 October 1987 (age 39) Adelaide, South Australia
- Listed height: 6 ft 8 in (2.03 m)
- Listed weight: 220 lb (100 kg)

Career information
- High school: Pasadena (Adelaide, South Australia); Lake Ginninderra (Canberra, ACT)
- NBA draft: 2009: undrafted
- Playing career: 2005–present

Career history
- 2005–2006: Australian Institute of Sport
- 2006–2009: South Dragons
- 2009–2010: CB Granada
- 2010–2013: FC Barcelona
- 2013–2014: Maccabi Tel Aviv
- 2014–2022: Utah Jazz
- 2022–2023: Milwaukee Bucks
- 2023–2024: Orlando Magic
- 2024–2026: Minnesota Timberwolves
- 2026–present: Melbourne United

Career highlights
- EuroLeague champion (2014); Israeli League champion (2014); Israeli Cup champion (2014); 2× Spanish League champion (2011, 2012); 2× Spanish Supercup champion (2011, 2012); Catalan League champion (2012); NBL champion (2009); 2× NBL All-Star (2006, 2008); All-NBL Third Team (2009); All-NBL Domestic Players Second Team (2008); NBL Rookie of the Year (2007); 2× Gaze Medal winner (2009, 2012)
- Stats at NBA.com
- Stats at Basketball Reference
Medals
Men's basketball
Representing Australia
Olympic Games
Bronze medal – third place	2020 Tokyo	Team
FIBA Oceania Championship
Gold medal – first place	2011 Australia
Gold medal – first place	2013 New Zealand & Australia
Silver medal – second place	2009 New Zealand & Australia

Joseph Howarth Ingles (/ˈɪŋɡəlz/ ING-ghəlz; born 2 October 1987) is an Australian professional basketball player for Melbourne United of the National Basketball League (NBL). He also represents the Australian national team. He primarily plays at the small forward position. He is the Utah Jazz all-time leader in three-pointers made.

== Early life ==
Born in the Adelaide suburb of Happy Valley, Ingles attended Pasadena High School. His junior club was the Southern Tigers. He later attended both Lake Ginninderra College and the Australian Institute of Sport (AIS) in Canberra with future Boomers teammates Brad Newley and Patty Mills. He played for the AIS men's team in the South East Australian Basketball League (SEABL) in 2005 and 2006. Along with basketball, Ingles also played Australian rules football and cricket in his younger years but gave up both sports to focus on basketball.

Ingles' two basketball goals as a boy were to play for the Adelaide 36ers and Australia. He was highly sought after when he came out of the AIS in 2006, and he subsequently met with the 36ers as a 17-year-old, but a couple of Adelaide blunders set him off interstate. Ingles said of the situation, "The minimum salary at the time was $20,000–$22,000 and while money wasn't a primary concern for me, they offered me a two-year deal at $12,500 per, plus two season tickets." Ingles had several other contract bids to consider, all offering at least the minimum and many of them providing additional incentives. His decision to not sign with the 36ers came when his contract from the club arrived with his first name misspelt as "Joesph". It did not leave a glowing impression on Ingles or his family, so he moved his attention to Melbourne.

== Professional career ==
=== South Dragons (2006–2009) ===
On 17 March 2006, Ingles signed a multi-year deal with the South Dragons of the National Basketball League, becoming the very first player to sign with the club. In the Dragons' debut game, the 18-year-old Ingles made league history by scoring the most points by an Australian on debut—29, on 11-of-15 shooting from the field. His excellent first season earned him the NBL Rookie of the Year Award. In 34 games in 2006–07, he averaged 15.3 points, 4.9 rebounds and 3.0 assists per game.

In 2007–08, Ingles played in 30 games for the Dragons, averaging 15.4 points, 6.3 rebounds and 4.9 assists per game.

In 2008–09, Ingles helped lead the Dragons to the minor premiership while earning All-NBL Third Team honours. He went on to help the Dragons win their maiden NBL championship with a 3–2 grand final series victory over the Melbourne Tigers. However, two months after winning their first title, the club folded due to financial difficulties. In 38 games for the club in 2008–09, Ingles averaged 13.1 points, 4.1 rebounds and 3.4 assists per game.

In 102 games for the Dragons over three seasons, Ingles averaged 14.5 points, 5.0 rebounds and 3.7 assists per game.

=== Granada (2009–2010) ===
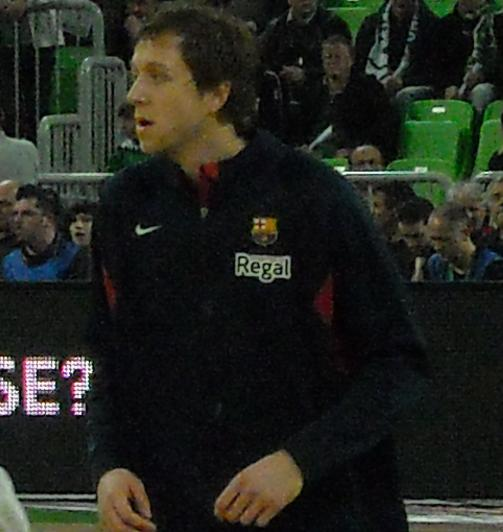
Ingles with the FC Barcelona in 2011

In July 2009, Ingles signed with Spanish club CB Granada of the Liga ACB.

=== Barcelona (2010–2013) ===
In November 2010, Ingles transferred from Granada to FC Barcelona, signing a three-year deal with the club. In his first career game with FC Barcelona, Ingles recorded 10 points and two steals in an 80–87 loss to the Caja Laboral. In June 2013, Ingles announced that he would not re-sign with Barcelona for the 2013–14 season.

=== Maccabi Tel Aviv (2013–2014) ===
On 24 July 2013, Ingles signed with Israeli club Maccabi Tel Aviv. Ingles and Maccabi, led by head coach David Blatt, went on to win the 2013–14 Euroleague championship.

=== Utah Jazz (2014–2022) ===
==== 2014–15 season ====
After spending preseason with the Los Angeles Clippers, Ingles was acquired by the Utah Jazz on 27 October 2014. Ingles made his NBA debut two days later, playing four minutes but only had a missed three-point attempt in a loss to the Houston Rockets. A day later, he recorded his first two NBA points in a loss to the Dallas Mavericks. Ingles began starting for the Jazz in March 2015, and on 23 March, he scored a season-high 18 points in a loss to the Minnesota Timberwolves.

==== 2015–16 season ====
On 10 July 2015, Ingles re-signed with the Jazz to a multi-year contract. On 26 December 2015, he scored a season-high 14 points in a loss to the Los Angeles Clippers. He topped that season high on 17 March 2016 with 15 points and career-high six steals in a 103–69 win over the Phoenix Suns.

==== 2016–17 season ====
On 14 November 2016, Ingles scored a then career-high 20 points in a 102–96 loss to the Memphis Grizzlies. He topped that mark on 8 December 2016, scoring 21 points while hitting a career-high five 3-pointers in a 106–99 loss to the Golden State Warriors. In Game 4 of the Jazz's first-round playoff series against the Los Angeles Clippers on 23 April 2017, Ingles had a career-high 11 assists in a 105–98 win that tied the series at 2–2. In 2016–17, Ingles recorded the best three-point percentage (.441) by a Jazz player since Kyle Korver set an NBA record (.536) in 2009–10, and became the first Jazz player in franchise history to shoot at least .441 from beyond the arc with at least 270 attempts.

==== 2017–18 season ====
On 25 July 2017, Ingles re-signed with the Jazz to a multi-year contract. Ingles was a starter for the entire first half of the season before coming off the bench for the first time on 19 January 2018 against the New York Knicks. A day later, in a 125–113 win over the Los Angeles Clippers, Ingles scored a career-high 21 points, reaching the 20-point mark for just the third time in his career. On 30 January 2018, he hit a career-high six 3-pointers and scored 20 points in a 129–99 win over the Golden State Warriors. On 9 February 2018, he set a new career high with 23 points in a 106–94 win over the Charlotte Hornets. Two days later, he had a 24-point effort in a 115–96 win over the Portland Trail Blazers. On 24 February 2018, in a 97–90 win over the Dallas Mavericks, Ingles played in his 200th straight game for the Jazz and finished with 12 points and eight assists. He recorded his 150th 3-pointer of the season during the game, trailing only Randy Foye (178) and Rodney Hood (161) for most 3-pointers in a single season for a Jazz player. On 7 March 2018, he recorded the first double-double of his NBA career with 11 points and 10 assists in a 104–84 win over the Indiana Pacers. On 17 March 2018, he recorded 14 points, nine assists and seven rebounds in a 103–97 win over the Sacramento Kings. Ingles made three 3-pointers to push his season total to 179, breaking the Jazz record of 178 set by Foye during the 2012–13 season. Five days later, in a 119–112 win over the Mavericks, Ingles had 18 points and 10 assists, equaling his career high. On 5 April 2018, in a 117–95 win over the Clippers, Ingles became the first Jazz player to make 200 3-pointers in a season. Three days later, he had 22 points on 9-of-12 shooting along with 10 assists in a playoff-clinching 112–97 win over the Los Angeles Lakers. In Game 3 of Utah's first-round playoff series against the Oklahoma City Thunder, Ingles scored 21 points, as the Jazz took a 2–1 lead in the series with a 115–102 win. The Jazz went on to win the series in six games. In Game 2 of the Jazz's second-round series against the Houston Rockets, Ingles scored a career-high 27 points with a career-best seven 3-pointers in a 116–108 win, helping Utah tie the series at 1–1.

==== 2018–19 season ====
On 19 October 2018, Ingles scored 27 points with seven 3-pointers in a 124–123 loss to the Golden State Warriors. On 2 November, he scored 19 points and became the seventh Jazz player with 500 3-pointers in a 110–100 loss to the Memphis Grizzlies. On 9 November, he matched his career high with 27 points and added a season-best seven assists to help the Jazz beat the Boston Celtics 123–115. His five 3-pointers moved him ahead of Deron Williams (511) on Utah's career list. On 28 November, in a 101–91 win over the Brooklyn Nets, Ingles made his 530th 3-pointer, tying Darrell Griffith for fourth on Utah's career list. On 6 February 2019, he had a career-high 11 assists in a 116–88 win over the Phoenix Suns. On 4 March, he matched his career high with 11 assists in a 115–112 loss to the New Orleans Pelicans. On 27 March, he recorded a career-high 14 assists to go with 11 points and nine rebounds in a 115–100 win over the Los Angeles Lakers. On 3 April, he tied a career high with 27 points on six 3-pointers in a 118–97 win over the Suns.

==== 2019–20 season ====
On 21 October 2019, Ingles agreed to a 1-year $14 million extension with the Jazz that kept him under contract through 2021–22.

==== 2020–21 season ====
On 8 January 2021, Ingles missed a game due to an Achilles injury which ended his streak of 418 consecutive games played. This streak included 384 regular-season games and 34 playoff games. His last missed game was on 16 December 2015. On 29 January, Ingles knocked down his 846th 3-pointer, surpassing John Stockton for the most three-pointers made in franchise history. On 17 April, Ingles had 20 points and a career-high-tying 14 assists in a 115–127 overtime loss to the Los Angeles Lakers. He finished as the runner-up for NBA Sixth Man of the Year behind Jazz teammate Jordan Clarkson.

==== 2021–22 season ====
On 30 January 2022, during a 106–126 blowout loss to the Minnesota Timberwolves, Ingles suffered a non-contact knee injury and exited the game. The next day, he was diagnosed with a torn left ACL and was subsequently ruled out for the rest of the season.

=== Milwaukee Bucks (2022–2023) ===
On 9 February 2022, Ingles was traded to the Portland Trail Blazers in a three-team trade. Due to his knee injury, he never played a game for the team.

On 6 July 2022, Ingles signed a one-year, $6.5 million deal with the Milwaukee Bucks. He made his Bucks debut on 19 December 2022, in a 128–119 win over the New Orleans Pelicans. On 30 December, Ingles recorded a double-double with 14 points and 10 assists in a 123–114 win over the Minnesota Timberwolves.

=== Orlando Magic (2023–2024) ===
On 7 July 2023, Ingles signed a two-year, $22 million contract with the Orlando Magic. Ingles made 68 total appearances for Orlando during the 2023–24 NBA season, recording averages of 4.4 points, 2.1 rebounds, and 3.0 assists.

=== Minnesota Timberwolves (2024–2026) ===
On 6 July 2024, Ingles signed a one-year, $3.3 million deal with the Minnesota Timberwolves. He had his first start of the season and first in three years on 21 March 2025, a move motivated by the presence of his family and his eldest son, who has autism, having sat through an entire NBA game for the first time the previous Sunday, in which Ingles was inactive. Head coach Chris Finch desired to give Ingles' son the chance to see his father play before the family headed back to their Florida residence. Ingles played the first six minutes of the game, recording one assist as the Timberwolves eventually won 134–93 over the New Orleans Pelicans.

On 7 July 2025, Ingles re-signed with the Timberwolves on a one-year contract worth the veteran minimum. He made 27 appearances (including two starts) for Minnesota, posted averages of 1.5 points, 0.7 rebounds, and 1.3 assists. On 12 April 2026, Ingles recorded 15 points and 10 assists in a 132–126 victory over the New Orleans Pelicans.

=== Melbourne United (2026–present) ===
On 19 May 2026, Ingles signed a two-year contract with Melbourne United, returning to the Australian NBL for the first time since 2009.

== National team career ==
At the 2008 Beijing Summer Olympic Games, Ingles made his Olympic debut for the Australian Boomers. In Australia's final match, a 116–85 loss to the United States, Ingles played the entire last quarter of the game, scoring 11 points on 100% shooting from the field, while also recording two rebounds and one assist.

At the 2010 FIBA World Championship, Ingles averaged 10.3 points, 3.0 rebounds and 2.2 assists in six games. At the 2012 London Olympics, Ingles again played well, and was the second-highest scorer for the Boomers after Patty Mills. In six games, Ingles finished with averages of 15.0 points, 5.0 rebounds and 4.2 assists per game. At the 2014 FIBA Basketball World Cup, Ingles averaged 11.4 points, 3.2 rebounds and 3.4 assists in six games. Besides being part of the Australian team that won bronze at the 2020 Tokyo Olympics, he also scored the first basket for Australia.

Ingles also competed for Australia at the 2024 Summer Olympics.

=== International stats ===
Tournament	Points per game	Rebounds per game	Assists per game
2008 FIBA Diamond Ball	5.0	1.7	.0
2008 Olympic Games	4.8	0.6	0.4
2009 FIBA Oceania	19.5	2.5	4.0
2010 FIBA World Cup	10.3	3.0	2.2
2011 London Invitational	10.5	3.8	3.0
2011 FIBA Oceania	7.3	3.3	3.7
2012 Olympic Games	15.0	5.0	4.2
2013 FIBA Oceania	9.0	6.0	3.5
2014 FIBA World Cup	11.4	3.2	3.4
2016 Olympic Games	7.8	3.1	3.2
2019 FIBA World Cup	10.5	6.1	5.6
2020 Olympic Games	11.2	4.7	4.0
2023 FIBA World Cup	6.6	3.4	3.0

== Career statistics ==
Legend
GP	Games played	GS	Games started	MPG	Minutes per game
FG%	Field-goal percentage	3P%	3-point field-goal percentage	FT%	Free-throw percentage
RPG	Rebounds per game	APG	Assists per game	SPG	Steals per game
BPG	Blocks per game	PPG	Points per game	PIR	Performance index rating
**Bold**	Career high

=== NBA ===
*	Led the league

==== Regular season ====
Year	Team	GP	GS	MPG	FG%	3P%	FT%	RPG	APG	SPG	BPG	PPG
2014–15	Utah	79	32	21.2	.415	.356	.750	2.2	2.3	.9	.1	5.0
2015–16	Utah	81	2	15.3	.426	.386	.722	1.9	1.2	.7	.0	4.2
2016–17	Utah	**82***	26	24.1	.452	.441	.735	3.2	2.7	1.2	.1	7.1
2017–18	Utah	**82***	81	**31.4**	.467	.440	.795	**4.2**	4.8	1.1	**.2**	11.5
2018–19	Utah	**82***	**82***	31.3	.448	.391	.707	4.0	**5.7**	**1.2**	**.2**	**12.1**
2019–20	Utah	72	45	29.7	.445	.399	.787	3.9	5.2	.9	.2	9.8
2020–21	Utah	67	30	27.9	.489	**.451**	.844	3.6	4.7	.7	.2	12.1
2021–22	Utah	45	15	24.9	.404	.347	.773	2.9	3.5	.5	.1	7.2
2022–23	Milwaukee	46	0	22.7	.435	.409	.857	2.8	3.3	.7	.1	6.9
2023–24	Orlando	68	0	17.2	.436	.435	.824	2.1	3.0	.6	.1	4.4
2024–25	Minnesota	19	1	6.0	.261	.200	–	.6	1.2	.1	.0	.8
2025–26	Minnesota	27	2	5.7	**.593**	.438	**1.000**	.7	1.3	.3	.1	1.5
Career		750	316	23.5	.448	.409	.775	3.0	3.5	.8	.1	7.7

==== Playoffs ====
Year	Team	GP	GS	MPG	FG%	3P%	FT%	RPG	APG	SPG	BPG	PPG
2017	Utah	**11**	**11**	30.3	.403	.366	.667	3.7	3.3	2.0	**.5**	6.5
2018	Utah	**11**	**11**	**34.8**	.471	.455	.647	4.4	3.4	.5	.2	**14.5**
2019	Utah	5	5	30.1	.324	.276	—	**4.8**	**5.0**	**2.2**	.0	6.4
2020	Utah	7	7	33.5	.407	.350	**1.000**	3.4	4.7	.6	.1	9.1
2021	Utah	**11**	6	27.8	.494	.414	.769	3.1	3.5	.6	.0	10.2
2023	Milwaukee	5	0	17.8	.522	.500	—	1.2	2.0	.6	.2	6.8
2024	Orlando	7	0	9.6	.333	.286	.500	1.9	1.7	.4	.0	1.6
2026	Minnesota	3	0	4.7	**.667**	**.667**	.500	.7	.0	.7	.0	2.3
Career		60	40	26.3	.442	.400	.714	3.2	3.2	1.0	.2	8.2

=== EuroLeague ===
†	Denotes seasons in which Ingles won the EuroLeague

Year	Team	GP	GS	MPG	FG%	3P%	FT%	RPG	APG	SPG	BPG	PPG	PIR
2010–11	Barcelona	15	4	15.7	.462	.233	.727	1.1	1.1	**.8**	**.1**	5.0	4.7
2011–12	Barcelona	21	2	13.3	.375	.231	**.800**	1.7	1.4	.6	.0	4.3	4.4
2012–13	Barcelona	29	**16**	20.1	.442	.394	.786	2.1	1.1	.4	**.1**	6.0	5.4
2013–14†	Maccabi	**30**	13	**22.9**	**.476**	**.417**	.697	**3.0**	**2.9**	**.8**	**.1**	**6.4**	**9.3**
Career		95	35	18.5	.443	.349	.755	2.2	1.7	.6	.1	5.6	6.3

== Personal life ==
Ingles is married to Australian netballer Renae Ingles; the couple have twins, a boy and a girl, born in 2016. Their third child, a second son, was born in 2020. Their son Jacob was diagnosed with autism which has led Joe to be an advocate for autism awareness. He also holds a British passport. He is a keen supporter of the Hawthorn Football Club in the Australian Football League, and is a good friend of former Hawk Jarryd Roughead.

== See also ==
- List of NBA career 3-point field goal percentage leaders
