= Daniel Kickert =

Australian basketball player (born 1983)

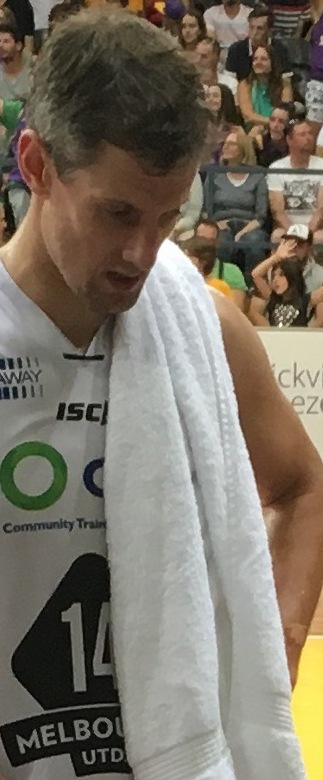
- Kickert with Melbourne United in 2015

Personal information
- Born: 29 May 1983 (age 43) Melbourne, Victoria, Australia
- Listed height: 208 cm (6 ft 10 in)
- Listed weight: 109 kg (240 lb)

Career information
- High school: Aquinas College (Melbourne, Victoria)
- College: Saint Mary's (2002–2006)
- NBA draft: 2006: undrafted
- Playing career: 2000–2021
- Position: Power forward / center
- Coaching career: 2021–present

Career history

Playing
- 2000: Nunawading Spectres
- 2001–2002: Australian Institute of Sport
- 2006–2007: Livorno
- 2007–2008: Breogán
- 2008–2010: Gran Canaria
- 2011–2012: Turów Zgorzelec
- 2012–2013: Dnipro
- 2013: Budivelnyk
- 2013–2014: Azovmash
- 2014: Iberostar Tenerife
- 2014–2016: Melbourne United
- 2016–2018: Brisbane Bullets
- 2017: South West Metro Pirates
- 2018–2021: Sydney Kings
- 2019: Hawke's Bay Hawks

Coaching
- 2021–2025: Sydney Kings (assistant)

Career highlights
- As player: All-NBL First Team (2016); All-NBL Second Team (2017); Ukrainian SuperLeague champion (2013); PLK All-Star (2012); 3× First-team All-WCC (2004–2006); As coach: 2× NBL champion (2022, 2023)
Medals
Men's basketball
Representing Australia
Commonwealth Games
Gold medal – first place	2018 Gold Coast	Team competition
FIBA Asia Cup
Gold medal – first place	2017 Lebanon

Daniel Michael Kickert (born 29 May 1983) is an Australian professional basketball coach and former player who most recently served as an assistant coach for the Sydney Kings of the National Basketball League (NBL). He played professionally for 15 seasons throughout Europe and Australia, with his stints in the NBL including Melbourne United (2014–16), Brisbane Bullets (2016–18) and Sydney Kings (2018–21). In 2017, he became the first player in NBL history to join the exclusive 50–40–90 club, an achievement he replicated the following year.

Kickert played college basketball for Saint Mary's, leaving in 2006 as the program's all-time scoring leader. He spent the next eight years playing in Europe, winning a Ukrainian SuperLeague championship in 2013 with BC Budivelnyk. He also played for Australia at the 2017 FIBA Asia Cup and 2018 Commonwealth Games. He retired from basketball in June 2021.

== Early life and career ==
Kickert was born in Melbourne, Victoria, in the suburb of Kew. He attended Aquinas College, Melbourne. In 2000, he played five games for the Nunawading Spectres in the South East Australian Basketball League (SEABL).

In 2001, Kickert moved to Canberra on a scholarship with the Australian Institute of Sport (AIS). He played for the AIS men's team in the SEABL in 2001 and 2002, where in his second year, he averaged 18 points and seven rebounds in 30 minutes per game while being named to the All-SEABL Eastern Conference team.

== College career ==
In his freshman season at Saint Mary's in 2002–03, Kickert earned All-Freshman team honours by CollegeInsider.com. He finished the season as the only Gael to start all 30 games, tied for 11th in the conference in scoring and had the third-best field goal percentage (52.0%) in the conference. In those 30 games, he averaged 12.7 points and 3.7 rebounds per game.

In his sophomore season, Kickert was named to the All-West Coast Conference first team and earned the Shamrock Office Solutions Classic Most Valuable Player award. He was also named to the Top of the World Classic All-Tournament team. In 31 games (all starts), he averaged 14.9 points and 5.9 rebounds per game.

In his junior season, Kickert was named to the All-West Coast Conference first team for the second straight year. He was also named to the USBWA All-District 9 first team and the NABC District 14 second team, while earning WCC Player of the Year honours by CollegeInsider.com. In addition, he was named to the WCC All-Tournament team after averaging 22.0 points and 4.5 rebounds against Santa Clara and Gonzaga. In 34 games (all starts), he averaged 16.6 points, 6.6 rebounds and 1.0 assists per game.

In his senior season, Kickert was named to the All-West Coast Conference first team for the third straight year and earned the Shamrock Office Solutions Classic Most Valuable Player award for the second time in his career. In 28 games (all starts), he averaged 16.7 points, 5.6 rebounds and 1.0 assists per game. He finished his career ranked as the all-time scorer in SMC history with 1,874 points.

=== College statistics ===
Year	Team	GP	GS	MPG	FG%	3P%	FT%	RPG	APG	SPG	BPG	PPG
2002–03	Saint Mary's	30	30	25.5	.520	.447	.782	3.7	.7	.3	.6	12.7
2003–04	Saint Mary's	31	31	28.1	.506	.390	.766	5.9	.7	.4	.5	14.9
2004–05	Saint Mary's	34	34	30.9	.538	.471	.846	6.6	1.0	.4	.7	16.6
2005–06	Saint Mary's	28	28	33.5	.454	.457	.880	5.6	1.0	.6	.7	16.7
Career		123	123	29.5	.504	.447	.816	5.5	.9	.4	.6	15.2

== Professional career ==
=== Europe (2006–2014) ===
After going undrafted in the 2006 NBA draft, Kickert played in Italy for his first professional season, averaging 10 points per game for Basket Livorno during the 2006–07 season. He spent the next three seasons in Spain, playing the 2007–08 season with CB Breogán before joining Gran Canaria. He parted ways with Canaria in July 2010 after two seasons.

On 2 February 2011, Kickert joined Polish team Turów Zgorzelec for a three-day trial. Following the trial period, he signed with Turów for the rest of the 2010–11 season. He averaged 9.3 points and 2.8 rebounds over 25 games. Though he came off the bench for most of the season, Kickert moved into the starting lineup for the Polish League finals and produced 13.6 points and 4.9 boards in the seven-game series as Turów nearly upset Asseco Prokom for the title. On 25 July 2011, he re-signed with Turów for the 2011–12 season.

In 2012, Kickert moved to Ukraine, where he spent the next two years. He began the 2012–13 season with BC Dnipro, before finishing the season with BC Budivelnyk. He played the majority of the 2013–14 season with BC Azovmash, but left the country to return to Spain in March 2014 due to the Ukraine's military conflict with Russia. He finished the 2013–14 season with Iberostar Tenerife.

=== Australia and New Zealand (2014–2021) ===
On 13 August 2014, Kickert signed with Melbourne United for the 2014–15 NBL season. In 28 games for Melbourne, he averaged 13.8 points and 4.4 rebounds per game.

On 10 June 2015, Kickert re-signed with United for the 2015–16 season. He came very close to becoming the first NBL player ever to join the exclusive 50–40–90 club. He did reach the required splits—finishing the season with figures of 52.5/47.2/90.5—but fell four made free throws short of the minimum requirements. Kickert helped United win the minor premiership in 2015–16 with a first-place finish and an 18–10 record, while earning All-NBL First Team honours. In 28 games, he averaged 14.8 points, 3.8 rebounds and 1.2 assists per game.

On 8 April 2016, Kickert signed with the Brisbane Bullets. After coming close in 2015–16, Kickert became the first player in NBL history to join the 50–40–90 club in 2016–17. He averaged 12.8 points per game and shot 54.4 percent from the field, 45.9 percent from three and 95.0 percent from the line.

In the 2017 off-season, Kickert had a stint with the South West Metro Pirates of the Queensland Basketball League, and competed at the 2017 FIBA Asia Cup with the Australian Boomers.

With the Bullets in 2017–18, Kickert recorded 50–40–90 numbers for the second consecutive year, averaging 14 points per game while shooting 52.2 percent from the field, 41.8 percent from three and 92.2 percent from the line.

On 27 April 2018, Kickert signed a two-year deal with the Sydney Kings, with a team option for the second year. The Kings took up that option on 29 March 2019.

In April 2019, Kickert joined the Hawke's Bay Hawks for the 2019 New Zealand NBL season, but injured his back in the first game. He returned to action in mid-May, but only managed seven games for the season due to the back injury.

On 3 September 2020, Kickert re-signed with the Kings on a one-year deal. At age 37, he was the league's oldest player in the 2020–21 NBL season.

On 11 June 2021, Kickert announced his retirement from professional basketball.

== National team career ==
Kickert competed for the Australian Boomers at the 2006 Stanković Continental Champions' Cup, 2006 FIBA World Championship, 2011 London Invitational Tournament, 2017 FIBA Asia Cup, and 2018 Commonwealth Games. In July 2018, Kickert was involved in the Philippines–Australia basketball brawl during the FIBA Basketball World Cup Asian qualification. As a result, he was suspended for five games.

== Coaching career ==
In September 2021, Kickert joined the Sydney Kings coaching staff as an assistant coach and player development coordinator. He won two NBL championships during his time as an assistant coach, parting ways with the Kings in March 2025.

== Personal ==
Kickert's parents are Rudy and Jenny. His wife's name is Erica. He holds a Dutch passport.

As of February 2020, Kickert was studying a Master of Business (Sport Management) at Deakin University.
