= 2012 United States women's Olympic basketball team =

- Head coach: Geno Auriemma
- Scoring leader: Diana Taurasi 12.4
- Rebounding leader: Candace Parker 7.8
- Assists leader: Sue Bird 4.5
- Biggest win: 52 vs. Angola
- Biggest defeat: none

The 2012 United States women's Olympic basketball team competed in the Games of the XXX Olympiad which were held in London, United Kingdom. The U.S. women's Olympic team won their seventh gold medal, and fifth consecutive, at the event. The United States defeated France in the gold medal final and bronze medalists Australia in the semifinal en route to their seventh victory at the event.

== Roster ==
United States women's national basketball team – 2012 Summer Olympics roster
Players
Coaches

Pos.	No.	Name	Age – Date of birth	Height	Club	Ctr.
G	4	Lindsay Whalen	30 – May 9, 1982	5 ft 9 in (1.75 m)	Minnesota Lynx	(United States)
F	5	Seimone Augustus	28 – April 30, 1984	6 ft 0 in (1.83 m)	Minnesota Lynx	(United States)
G	6	Sue Bird	31 – October 16, 1980	5 ft 9 in (1.75 m)	Seattle Storm	(United States)
F	7	Maya Moore	23 – June 11, 1989	6 ft 0 in (1.83 m)	Minnesota Lynx	(United States)
F	8	Angel McCoughtry	25 – September 10, 1986	6 ft 1 in (1.85 m)	Atlanta Dream	(United States)
F	9	Asjha Jones	31 – August 1, 1980	6 ft 3 in (1.91 m)	Connecticut Sun	(United States)
F	10	Tamika Catchings	33 – July 21, 1979	6 ft 1 in (1.85 m)	Indiana Fever	(United States)
F	11	Swin Cash	32 – September 22, 1979	6 ft 1 in (1.85 m)	Chicago Sky	(United States)
G/F	12	Diana Taurasi	30 – June 11, 1982	6 ft 0 in (1.83 m)	Phoenix Mercury	(United States)
C	13	Sylvia Fowles	27 – June 10, 1985	6 ft 6 in (1.98 m)	Chicago Sky	(United States)
C	14	Tina Charles	23 – December 5, 1988	6 ft 4 in (1.93 m)	Connecticut Sun	(United States)
F/C	15	Candace Parker	26 – April 19, 1986	6 ft 4 in (1.93 m)	Los Angeles Sparks	(United States)

Head coach

- (United States) Geno Auriemma

Assistant coach(es)

- (United States) Doug Bruno
- (United States) Jennifer Gillom
- (United States) Marynell Meadors

Legend

- Club – describes last
  club before the tournament
- Age – describes age
  on 28 July 2012

== Results ==
=== Group stage ===
28 July 2012
16:45

Report

United States	81–56	Croatia
Scoring by quarter: 11–4, 20–24, 22–19, 28–9
Pts: Charles 14; Rebs: Parker 13; Asts: Bird 5		Pts: Ivezić 22; Rebs: Ivanković 7 Asts: Lelas 5

Basketball Arena, London
Referees: Juan Arteaga (ESP), Oļegs Latiševs (LAT), Snehal Bendke (IND)

30 July 2012
22:15

Report

Angola	38–90	United States
Scoring by quarter: 12–22, 6–19, 11–28, 9–21
Pts: Guadalupe 11; Rebs: Mauricio, Manuel 6 Asts: Manuel 2		Pts: Parker 14; Rebs: Parker 12; Asts: Bird 5

Basketball Arena, London
Referees: Carole Delauné (FRA), Marcos Benito (BRA), Robert Lottermoser (GER)

1 August 2012
22:15

Report

United States	89–58	Turkey
Scoring by quarter: 19–16, 22–10, 22–21, 26–11
Pts: McCoughtry 18; Rebs: three players 7 Asts: Bird 4		Pts: Vardarlı, Hollingsworth 11; Rebs: Hollingsworth 8 Asts: Vardarlı, Alben 3

Basketball Arena, London
Referees: Michael Aylen (AUS), Stephen Seibel (CAN), Peng Ling (CHN)

3 August 2012
22:15

Report

Czech Republic	61–88	United States
Scoring by quarter: 26–24, 12–24, 9–22, 14–18
Pts: Zrůstová 15; Rebs: Pecková 6 Asts: Bartoňová 3		Pts: Taurasi 18; Rebs: Charles 14; Asts: Bird 9

Basketball Arena, London
Referees: Elena Chernova (RUS), Marcos Benito (BRA), Vitalis Gode (KEN)

5 August 2012
16:45

Report

China	66–114	United States
Scoring by quarter: 28–31, 8–30, 12–33, 18–20
Pts: Song Xiaoyun 15; Rebs: four players 3 Asts: Miao Lijie 8		Pts: Taurasi 22; Rebs: Moore 7 Asts: Catchings 7

Basketball Arena, London
Referees: Guerrino Cerebuch (ITA), Borys Ryschyk (UKR), Carole Delauné (FRA)

=== Quarterfinal ===
7 August 2012
14:00

Report

United States	91–48	Canada
Scoring by quarter: 19–8, 23–13, 26–10, 23–17
Pts: Taurasi 15; Rebs: Moore, Parker 7 Asts: Bird 5		Pts: Smith 13; Rebs: Phillips 8 Asts: Phillips 5

Basketball Arena, London
Referees: Guerrino Cerebuch (ITA), Shoko Sugruro (JPN), Vitalis Gode (KEN)

=== Semifinal ===
9 August 2012
17:00

Report

Australia	73–86	United States
Scoring by quarter: 22–20, 25–23, 12–22, 14–21
Pts: Cambage 19; Rebs: Jackson 17; Asts: Jarry 5		Pts: Taurasi, Charles 14; Rebs: Charles 10; Asts: Charles 4

North Greenwich Arena, London
Referees: Ilija Belošević (SRB), Borys Ryschyk (UKR), Snehal Bendke (IND)

=== Gold Medal Final ===
11 August 2012
21:00

Report

United States	86–50	France
Scoring by quarter: 20–15, 17–10, 26–12, 23–13
Pts: Parker 21; Rebs: Parker 11; Asts: Taurasi 6		Pts: Gruda, Lawson-Wade 12; Rebs: Ndongue 8 Asts: Dumerc 3

North Greenwich Arena, London
Referees: Fernando Sampietro (ARG), Elena Chernova (RUS), Peng Ling (CHN)

== See also ==
- 2012 Summer Olympics
- Basketball at the 2012 Summer Olympics
- United States at the 2012 Summer Olympics
- United States women's national basketball team
