= Rubens Donizete =

Brazilian bicyclist

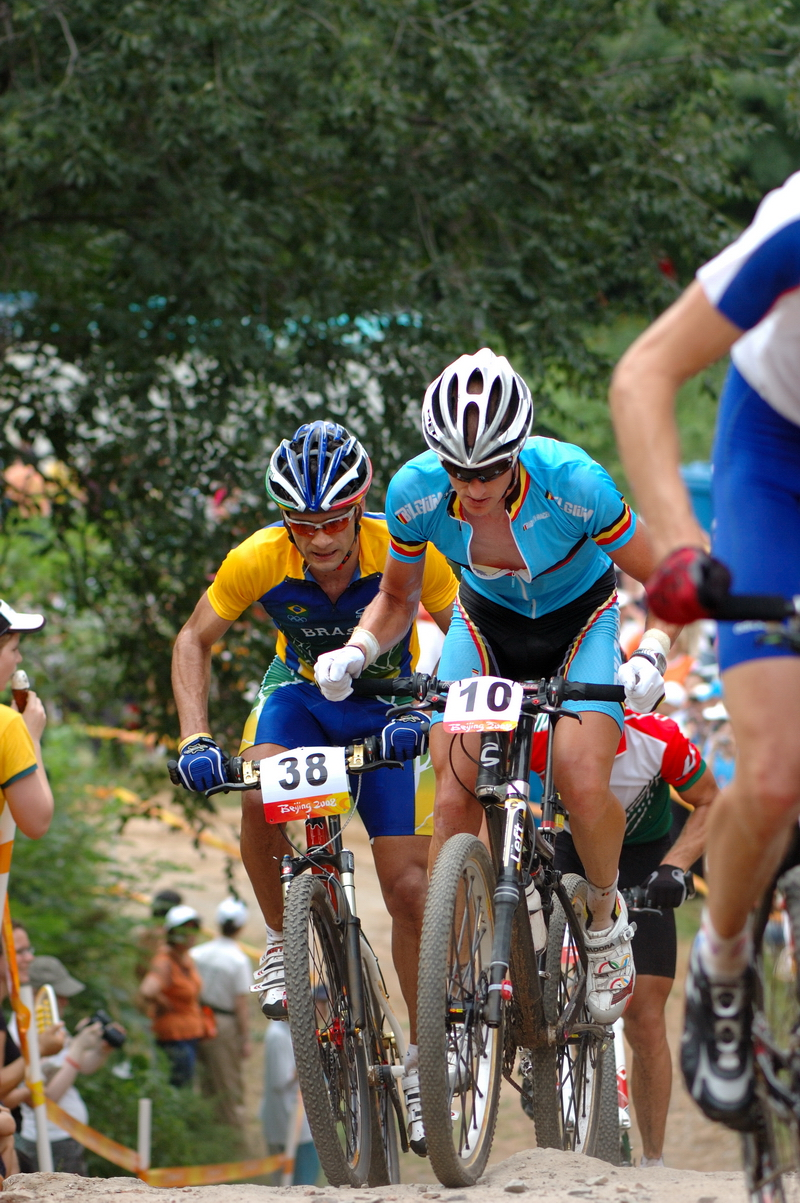
- Rubens Donizete (38) at the 2008 Summer Olympics

Personal information
- Full name: Rubens Valeriano Donizete
- Nicknames: "Rubinho", R1
- Born: 14 August 1979 (age 47) Monte Santo de Minas, Brazil
- Height: 5 ft 10 in (1.78 m)
- Weight: 175 lb (79 kg)

Cycling career
- Sport: Cycling
- Current team: AOO/Specialized
- Discipline: Mountain Bike
- Role: Rider
- Rider type: Cross Country
Medal record
Representing Brazil
Men's mountain bike racing
Pan american games
Silver medal – second place	Rio 2007	Mountain Bike
South American Games
Silver medal – second place	Colômbia 2010	Mountain Bike
Silver medal – second place	Chile 2014	Mountain Bike
Pan american games of Mountain Bike
Silver medal – second place	Guatemala 2010	Mountain Bike
Bronze medal – third place	México 2012	Mountain Bike
Brazilian Championship XCO
Bronze medal – third place	Juiz de Fora 2013	Mountain Bike
Gold medal – first place	Salvador 2012	Mountain Bike
Gold medal – first place	Caconde 2011	Mountain Bike
Silver medal – second place	Campo Largo 2010	Mountain Bike
Bronze medal – third place	Resende 2009	Mountain Bike
Silver medal – second place	São Bento do Sul 2008	Mountain Bike
Gold medal – first place	Ouro Preto 2007	Mountain Bike
Brazilian Championship XCM
Silver medal – second place	Caconde 2010	Mountain Bike
Bronze medal – third place	São Lourenço 2006	Mountain Bike

Rubens Valeriano Donizete (born 14 August 1979 in Monte Santo de Minas) is a Brazilian bicyclist who competed in the 2008 Summer Olympics and the 2012 Summer Olympics. He was a member of the Brazilian Mountain Bike team. He currently runs the team AOO/Specialized (2015-2016).

== Career ==
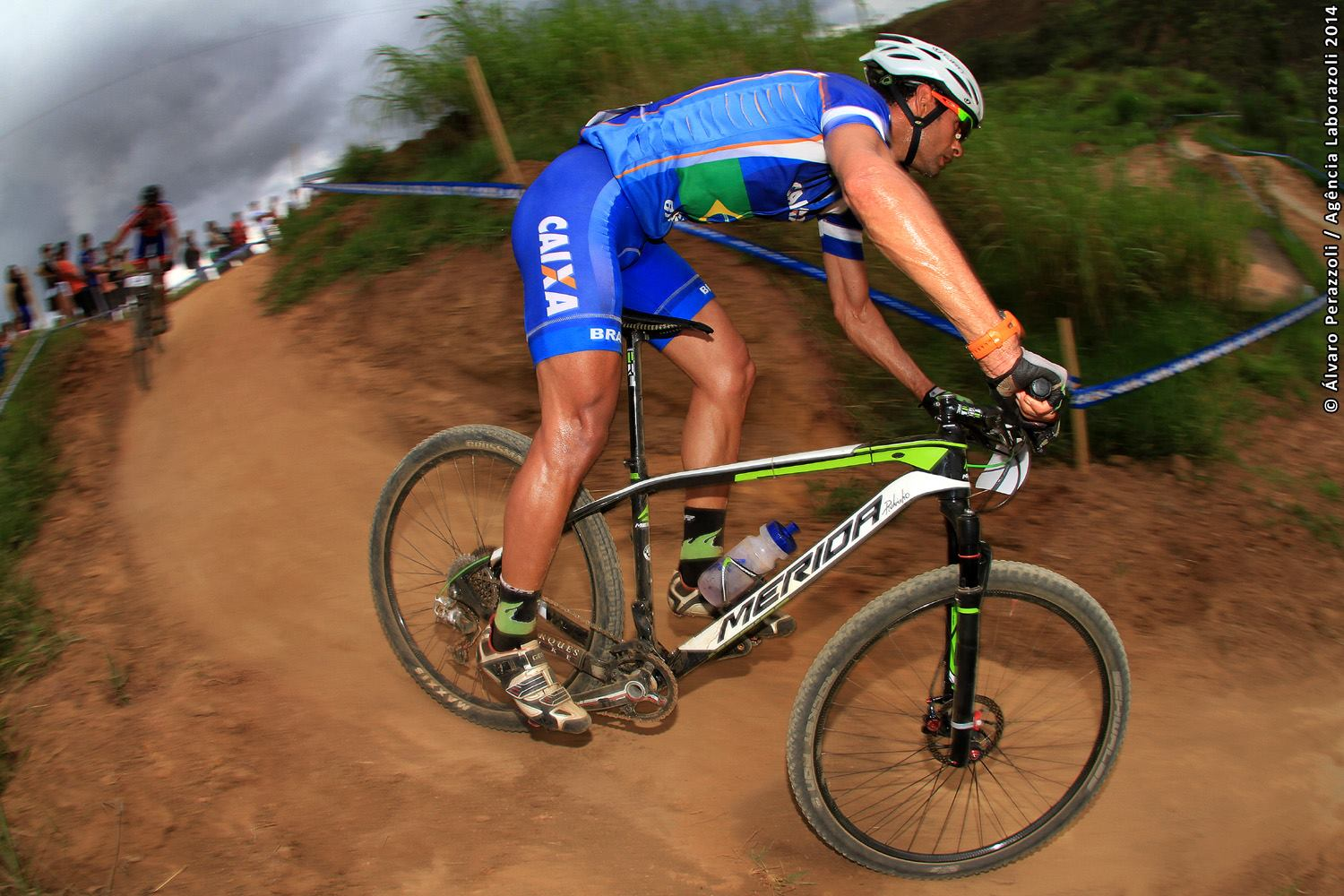
Rubens Donizeti Valeriano - Pan American Championship MTB 2014 - Barbacena - MG - Brazil

Rubens worked as a bricklayer in his hometown. In 2000, he had to make a difficult decision and that would forever change his life, he stopped his paid work and devoted himself exclusively to cycling. In 2001 he got his first sponsorship. At that point he had the vision to represent Brazil in the Olympics. After many wins in competitions inside out outside of Brazil, his Olympic dream began in 2007. He joined the national mountain bike team that competed in the Pan American Games in Rio de Janeiro, and took the silver medal.

Rubens won the 2008 Brazilian mountain biking championship and the vacancy for the 2008 Beijing Olympic Games where he finished as the best Brazilian in 21st position.

In 2015 he was hired by Team AOO/Specialized, looking to the vacancy for the Olympic games in Rio de Janeiro 2016.

== Major achievements ==
=== 2014 ===
- 23 November 2014 - CHAMPION - Regional Open Games - Bauru - SP - Brazil
- 17 November 2014 - 3rd Place - 2º Circuit Imbatível de MTB Pague Menos by Ravelli - Nova Odessa - SP - Brazil
- 19 October 2014 - CHAMPION - Avibe CUP MTB 2014 - Ubá - MG - Brazil
- 12 October 2014 - CHAMPION - 4th stage International MTB Cup - XCO - São Roque - SP - Brazil
- 14 September 2014 - Practice Test - 6th Step XCM - Copa kalangasbikes - São João da Boa Vista - SP - Brazil
- 6 September 2014 - 79th Place - 2014 UCI Mountain Bike & Trials World Championships - Hafjell - Norway
- 17 August 2014 - 18th Place - 3rd stage International MTB Cup - XCM - Barbacena - MG - Brazil
- 10 August 2014 - 78th Place - 6th Stage World Cup MTB XCO 2014 - Windham - United States
- 3 August 2014 - 90th Place - 5th Stage World Cup MTB XCO 2014 - Mont-Sainte-Anne - Canada
- 20 July 2014 - 5th Place - Brazilian Cup MTB XCO - Cotia - SP - Brazil
- 8 July 2014 - 2nd Place - Elite Mode Cycling MTB - 58th Regional Games of the 2nd Region Sports - Caraguatatuba - SP - Brazil
- 6 July 2014 - CHAMPION - 2nd Step - Brazil Cup MTB - UCI Class 2 XCO - Rio das Ostras - RJ - Brazil
- 1 June 2014 - CHAMPION - VIII Cup MTB Fest 2014 - Passos - MG - Brazil
- 25 May 2014 - 3rd Place - 70 km Mountain Bike - Brasília - DF - Brazil
- 18 May 2014 - 2nd Place - 2nd stage International Cup MTB - XCO - São João Del Rei - MG - Brazil
  - 17 May 2014 - 4th Place - Sprint Eliminator XCE - 2nd stage International Cup MTB - XCO - São João Del Rei - MG - Brazil
- 27 April 2014 - CHAMPION - Mantiqueira Challenge MTB - Campos do Jordão - SP - Brazil
- 30 March 2014 - 15th Place - Pan American Championship MTB 2014 XCO - Barbacena -MG - Brazil
- 23 March 2014 - 3rd place - Overall 1ª stage Internacional Cup MTB - XCO - Araxá - MG - Brazil
  - 23 March 2014 - 5th place - 3º phase XCS 1ª stage Internacional Cup MTB - XCO - Araxá - MG - Brazil
  - 22 March 2014 - 3rd place - 2º phase XCS 1ª stage Internacional Cup MTB - Short Track XCC - Araxá - MG - Brazil
  - 21 March 2014 - 2nd place - 1º phase XCS 1ª stage Internacional Cup MTB - Contra-relógio XCT - Araxá/MG - Brazil
- 15 March 2014 - 2nd place - Sul-americanos Games - Santiago - Chile
- 9 March 2014 - 2nd place - 1º stage - Trophy Brazil MTB XCO - Campo Largo – PR - Brazil
- 8 February 2014 - 2nd place - Cup Internacional Chile UCI Classe 2 XCO - Chile

=== 2013 ===
- 15 December 2013 - 2nd place - 1º Circuit Imbatível de MTB Pague Menos by Ravelli - Nova Odessa - SP - Brazil
- 7 December 2013 - 4th place - RED BULL Amazônia KIRIMBAWA - Manaus - AM - Brazil
- 24 November 2013 - 5th place - National Brazilian Championship XCM - Juiz de Fora - MG Brazil
- 2 November 2013 – 6th place – Circuito Latino Americano MTB Shimano Short Track – Medellin - Colômbia
- 20 October 2013 – Champion - 77th Edition Game Open inside State São Paulo cat. MTB - Mogi das Cruzes - SP - Brazil
- 6 October 2013 – 2nd place - current MTB International Cup 2013 – Costa do Sauípe – BA - Brazil
- 6 October 2013 – 6th place - Maraton XCM - 5th stage - MTB International Cup – Costa do Sauípe – BA - Brazil
- 5 October 2013 – Champion - Short Track XCC - 5th stage - MTB International Cup – Costa do Sauípe – BA - Brazil
- 4 October 2013 – 3rd place - Time trial XCT - 5th stage - MTB International Cup – Costa do Sauípe – BA - Brazil
- 8 September 2013 - Champion - Shimano Fest Short Track - Mogi das Cruzes - SP - Brazil
- 1 September 2013 - 41st place - 2013 UCI Mountain Bike & Trials World Championships - Pietermaritzburg - South Africa
- 18 August 2013 – 6th place – 4th stage - XCM MTB International Cup – Congonhas – MG - Brazil
- 16 August 2013 – Champion - challenge ascent uphill - 4th stage - MTB International Cup – Congonhas – MG - Brazil
- 10 August 2013 - 36th place - 2013 UCI Mountain Bike World Cup - Mont Sainte Anne - Canada
- 21 July 2013 - 3rd place - National Brazilian Championship XCO - Juiz de Fora - MG - Brazil
- 30 June 2013 - 2nd place - 3rd stage - XCO MTB International Cup – Divinópolis – MG - Brazil
- 28 June 2013 – 4th place – 3rd stage - Sprint Eliminator - MTB International Cup – Divinópolis – MG - Brazil
- 9 June 2013 – Champion - 2nd stage - Brazil Cup MTB XCO – Campo Largo – PR - Brazil
- 19 May 2013 – Champion - Trophy Brazil XCO – Rios das Ostras – RJ - Brazil
- 5 May 2013 – 2nd place – 2nd stage - XCO MTB International Cup – São João Del Rei – MG - Brazil
- 7 April 2013 - 4th place - 2013 MTB Pan American Games - Tafi Del Valle – Tucuman - Argentina
- 24 March 2013 – Champion – 1st stage - XCO MTB International Cup – Araxá – MG - Brazil
- 23 March 2013 – 5th place – 1st stage - Sprint Eliminator - MTB International Cup – Araxá – MG - Brazil
- 10 March 2013 – 4th place - 1st stage - Brazil Cup MTB XCO – Campo Largo – PR - Brazil
- 3 February 2013 – 2nd place – 1st stage - XCO Circuit Caloi Gp Ravelli – Itú – SP - Brazil

=== 2012 ===
- 19 November 2012 - Champion – Regional Open Games – Bauru – SP – Brazil
- 30 September 2012 - Champion – 3rd stage - MTB Brazil Cup – Campo Largo – PR – Brazil
- 8 September 2012 - 47th Place - 2012 UCI Mountain Bike & Trials World Championships- Saalfelden – Austria
- 26 August 2012 – 2nd Place – Shimano Short Track – Mogi das Cruzes – SP – Brazil
- 19 August 2012 - Five-time Champion – MTB International Cup – Congonhas – MG – Brazil
- 19 August 2012 – 4th Place – 4th stage - MTB International Cup – Congonhas – MG – Brazil
- 12 August 2012 – 24th Place – Olympic Games of London – London - England
- 15 July 2012 - three-time Champion - National Brazilian Championship XCO - Salvador - BA – Brazil
- 24 June 2012 - Champion – 3rd stage - MTB International Cup UCI – Divinópolis – MG – Brazil
- 20 May 2012 - 2nd Place – 2nd stage - MTB Brazil Cup – Rio das Ostras – RJ – Brazil
- 6 May 2012 - 2nd Place – 2nd stage - MTB International Cup UCI – São Lourenço – MG – Brazil
- 22 April 2012 - 2nd Place - Portugal Cup XCO Marietel - Seia – Portugal
- 8 April 2012 - Bronze Medal - 2012 Mountain Bike Pan American Games - Puebla - Mexico
- 25 March 2012 - 2nd Place – 1st stage - MTB International Cup - Araxá – MG – Brazil
- 17 March 2012 - 4th Place - Quaker-Cannondale XCO Cup - Nevados de Chillán – Chile
- 11 March 2012 - Champion – 1st stage - MTB Brazil Cup – Campo Largo – PR – Brazil
- 26 February 2012 – Champion – National Cup - Orosí - Paraíso de Cartago – Costa Rica
- 12 February 2012 – Champion – 1st stage - GP Ravelli – Itú – SP – Brazil

=== 2011 ===
- 16 October 2011 - 5th Place - 2011 Pan American Games - Guadalajara – Mexico
- 3 September 2011 - 48th Place - 2011 UCI Mountain Bike & Trials World Championships- Champery – Switzerland
- 21 August 2011 - four-time Champion - MTB International Cup - Congonhas - MG – Brazil
- 21 August 2011 - 2nd Place - 3rd stage - MTB International Cup - Congonhas - MG – Brazil
- 7 August 2011 - Champion - MTB Championship interstate - Vinhedo- SP – Brazil
- 31 July 2011 - 10th Place - Hadleigh Farm Mountain Bike International - London – England
- 17 July 2011 - Two-time Champion National Brazilian Championship XCO - Caconde - SP – Brazil
- 3 July 2011 - 3rd Place - 1st stage - MTB Santa Catarina Cup - Balneário Camboriú - SC – Brazil
- 19 July 2011 - 5th Place - 2nd stage - MTB International Cup - São Lourenço - MG – Brazil
- 29 May 2011 - Champion - 2nd stage - MTB Championship interstate - Vinhedo- SP – Brazil
- 22 May 2011 - 2nd Place - 2nd stage - Taça Brasil de Mountain Bike – Rio de Janeiro - RJ – Brazil
- 17 April 2011 - 2nd Place - 1st stage - MTB International Cup - Araxá - MG – Brazil
- 3 April 2011 - 12th Place - 2011 Mountain Bike Pan American Games - Chia – Colombia
- 20 March 2011 - Champion - 1st stage - MTB Championship interstate - Jarinu - SP – Brazil
- 13 March 2011 - 2nd Place – 1st stage - MTB Brazil Cup – Campo Largo – PR – Brazil
- 13 February 2011 – 2nd Place – 1st stage - GP Ravelli – ITU – SP – Brazil

=== 2010 ===
- Champion Xterra Regional Estrada Real - Tiradentes - MG – Brazil
- Champion SHIMANO SHORT TRACK – Colombia
- Three-time Champion MTB International Levorin Cup - Congonhas – Brazil
- Three-time Champion SR Suntour Short Track - São Silvano 2010 – Brazil
- Runner-up Brazilian - 2010 -Brazil
- Silver Medal 2010 Mountain Bike Pan American Games – Guatemala
- Silver Medal 2010 South American Games – Colombia
- Champion SRAM 50K – Brazil
- Champion 1st stage - MTB International Levorin Cup - Araxá – Brazil
- Champion 2nd stage - MTB International Levorin Cup - São Lourenço – Brazil
- Champion 1st stage - GP Ravelli – Brazil
- 8th place Tour de La Villa D'Aosta – Italy

=== 2009 ===
- Champion MTB 12 Horas – Brazil
- Champion 70 km of Ceilândia – Brazil
- Two-time Champion MTB International Vzan Cup – Brazil
- Champion 2nd stage - MTB International Cup - São Lourenço - MG – Brazil
- Two-time Champion Shimano Short Track São Silvano – Brazil
- Champion ALE Inconfidentes Cup – Brazil
- Best Brazilian UCI Mountain Bike World Cup 31st position - Mont-Sainte-Anne – Canada
- Champion 1st stage - GP Ravelli – Brazil
- Champion 2nd stage - GP Ravelli – Brazil
- Two-time Champion - GP Ravelli – Brazil
- Champion 1st stage - X-Terra – Estrada Real – Brazil
- Champion 1st stage - Inconfidentes Cup – Brazil

=== 2008 ===
- Champion Moda Cup – Brazil
- Champion GP Ravelli – Brazil
- Champion Shimano Short-Track São Silvano – Brazil
- Champion da MTB Internacional Cup – Brazil
- Vice-Campeão Brasieliro Cross Country – Brazil
- 21st place - Best Brazilian Beijing Olympics - China
- Best Brazilian UCI Mountain Bike World Cup 25th place

=== 2007 ===
- (Brazil) Champion Brasileiro de MTB
- Silver medal 2007 Pan American Games mountain bike – Rio de Janeiro, Brazil
- Champion MTB Assitur Cup – Brazil
