= London 10km Marathon Swimming International =

Swimming event in London, England

The London 10 km Marathon Swimming International was an event which took place in the Serpentine. It took place on 13 August 2011 and served as the test event for marathon swimming at the 2012 Summer Olympics.

== Result ==
=== Men ===
Position	Swimmer	Time
1	Richard Weinberger (CAN)	1:50:49.8
2	Thomas Lurz (GER)	+26.2
3	Spyros Gianniotis (GRE)	+26.3
4	Luca Ferretti (ITA)	+29.0
5	Andreas Waschburger (GER)	+42.8
6	Csaba Gercsák (HUN)	+53.9
7	Alex Meyer (USA)	+1:29.7
8	Ky Hurst (AUS)	+1:30.3
9	Chris Bryan (IRL)	+1:34.7
10	Yuriy Kudinov (KAZ)	+1:39.2

=== Women ===
Position	Rider	Time
1	Martina Grimaldi (ITA)	2:02:49.5
2	Eva Fabian (USA)	+0.5
3	Poliana Okimoto (BRA)	+1.7
4	Christine Jennings (USA)	+1.9
5	Ana Marcela–Cunha (BRA)	+2.3
6	Melissa Gorman (AUS)	+6.8
7	Jana Pechanova (CZE)	+6.9
8	Fang Yanqiao (CHN)	+11.9
9	Angela Maurer (GER)	+12.7
10	Li Xue (CHN)	+15.2
