= Ogo Adegboye =

Nigerian-British basketball player

Personal information
- Born: 23 September 1987 (age 39) Ibadan, Nigeria
- Listed height: 6 ft 1 in (1.85 m)
- Listed weight: 185 lb (84 kg)

Career information
- High school: Findlay College Prep (Henderson, Nevada)
- College: Lamar CC (2007–2009); St. Bonaventure (2009–2011)
- NBA draft: 2011: undrafted
- Playing career: 2011–2020
- Position: Point guard

Career history
- 2011–2012: APOEL
- 2012–2013: ETHA Engomis
- 2013–2014: Nea Kifissia
- 2014–2015: Aris Thessaloniki
- 2015: Vanoli Cremona
- 2015–2016: Juvecaserta Basket
- 2016: Viola Reggio Calabria
- 2016–2017: Kymis
- 2017: Fulgor Libertas Forlì
- 2018–2019: NPC Rieti
- 2020: London Lions

Career highlights
- Cypriot Cup winner (2013)

Stephen Ogooluwa "Ogo" Adegboye (born 23 September 1987) is a Nigerian-British professional basketball player who last played for London Lions of the British Basketball League (BBL).

== Early life ==
Born in Nigeria, Adegboye moved to London at the age of three. He played with the Brixton Topcats of the English Basketball League, before moving to the US to attend Findlay College Prep.

== College career ==
Adegboye spent two seasons with Lamar Community College in Colorado, where he averaged 11.1 points and 3.2 assists per game, before transferring to St. Bonaventure University, where he played with the St. Bonaventure Bonnies. In his junior year, he averaged 6.6 points, 2.4 assists, and 1.7 rebounds, in 21.6 minutes per game for the Bonnies. During his senior year, he started all 31 games and led the country in minutes, finishing the season averaging 11.5 points, 4 assists, and 3.1 rebounds in 39 minutes per game.

== Professional career ==
Adegboye started his professional career, in 2011, with APOEL of the Cypriot Basketball League. With APOEL, he averaged 10.2ppg, 1.9rpg, 2.2apg and 1.3spg. The following season, he stayed at Cyprus, signing a contract with the running champions ETHA Engomis. With ETHA, he won the Cypriot Cup in 2013.

On 31 October 2013 Adegboye joined Nea Kifisia of the Greek Basket League. He joined Aris Thessaloniki in 2014 signing a one-month contract, in order to replace the injured Torey Thomas.

On 30 September 2016 Adegboye signed a one-month contract with Vanoli Cremona of the LBA. He optioned out of his contract with Vanoli Cremona on December and joined Juvecaserta Basket. He also left the team one month later and joined Viola Reggio Calabria for the rest of the season.

On 24 October 2016, Adegboye returned to Greece and joined the newly promoted Kymis of the Greek Basket League, replacing Juan'ya Green on the team's squad. On 4 February 2017 he left Kymis and returned to Italy in order to join Fulgor Libertas Forlì for the rest of the season.

On 17 January 2020 Adegboye signed with the London Lions in England for the 2019–20 BBL season to replace Jorge Romero.

== International career ==
During 2010, Adegboye made his debut with the senior men's Great Britain national basketball team. With the British national team, he played at EuroBasket 2011 and EuroBasket 2013.
