= Basketball Arena (London) =

Venue of the 2012 Summer Olympics

- The Marshmallow
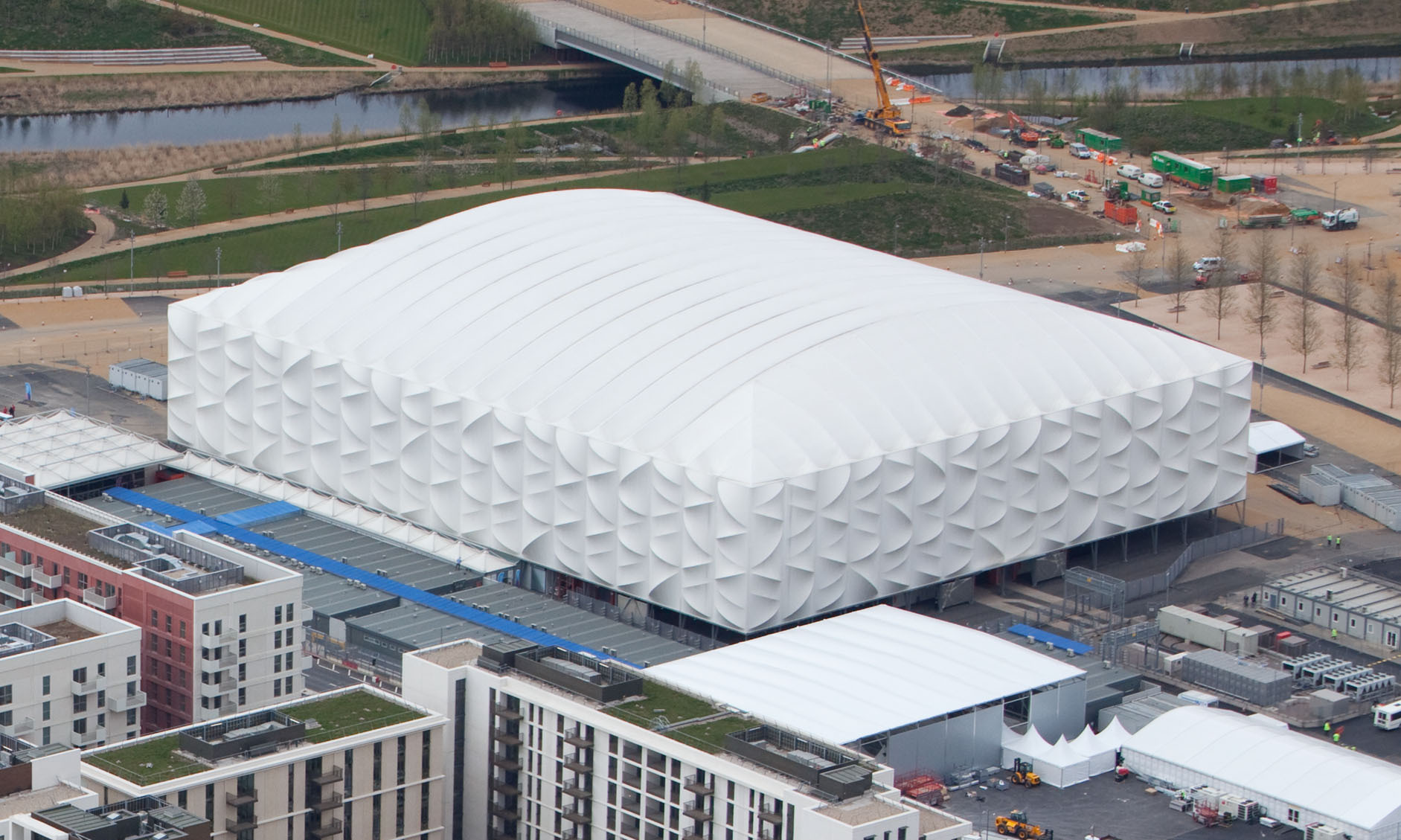
- The Basketball Arena in April 2012
- Interactive map of Basketball Arena
- Location: Olympic Park; Stratford; London; United Kingdom
- Coordinates: 51.5486°N 0.0139°W
- Operator: Olympic Delivery Authority
- Capacity: 12,000
- Acreage: 11,500 sq m

Construction
- Groundbreaking: October 2009
- Built: June 2011
- Opened: 16 August 2011
- Demolished: 2013
- Cost: £40 million €49 million $62.5 million
- Architects: WilkinsonEyre & KSS Design Group
- Project manager: SKM
- Structural engineer: SKM
- Services engineer: SKM
- Main contractor: GL events Slick Seating

Tenants
- 2012 Summer Olympics; 2012 Summer Paralympics

The Basketball Arena for the 2012 Summer Olympics and the 2012 Summer Paralympics was located in the Olympic Park in Stratford, London. The arena was designed to be fully recyclable, and was dismantled in January 2013, the seating was sold to Barnet owner Tony Kleanthous to be used in the construction of The Hive Stadium.

== History ==
London's Olympic bid proposed that there would be four arenas in the Olympic Park, but the revised masterplan published in 2006 reduced this to three, with the volleyball matches being moved to Earls Court Exhibition Centre. The fencing arena was also cancelled, and the fencing took place at ExCeL.

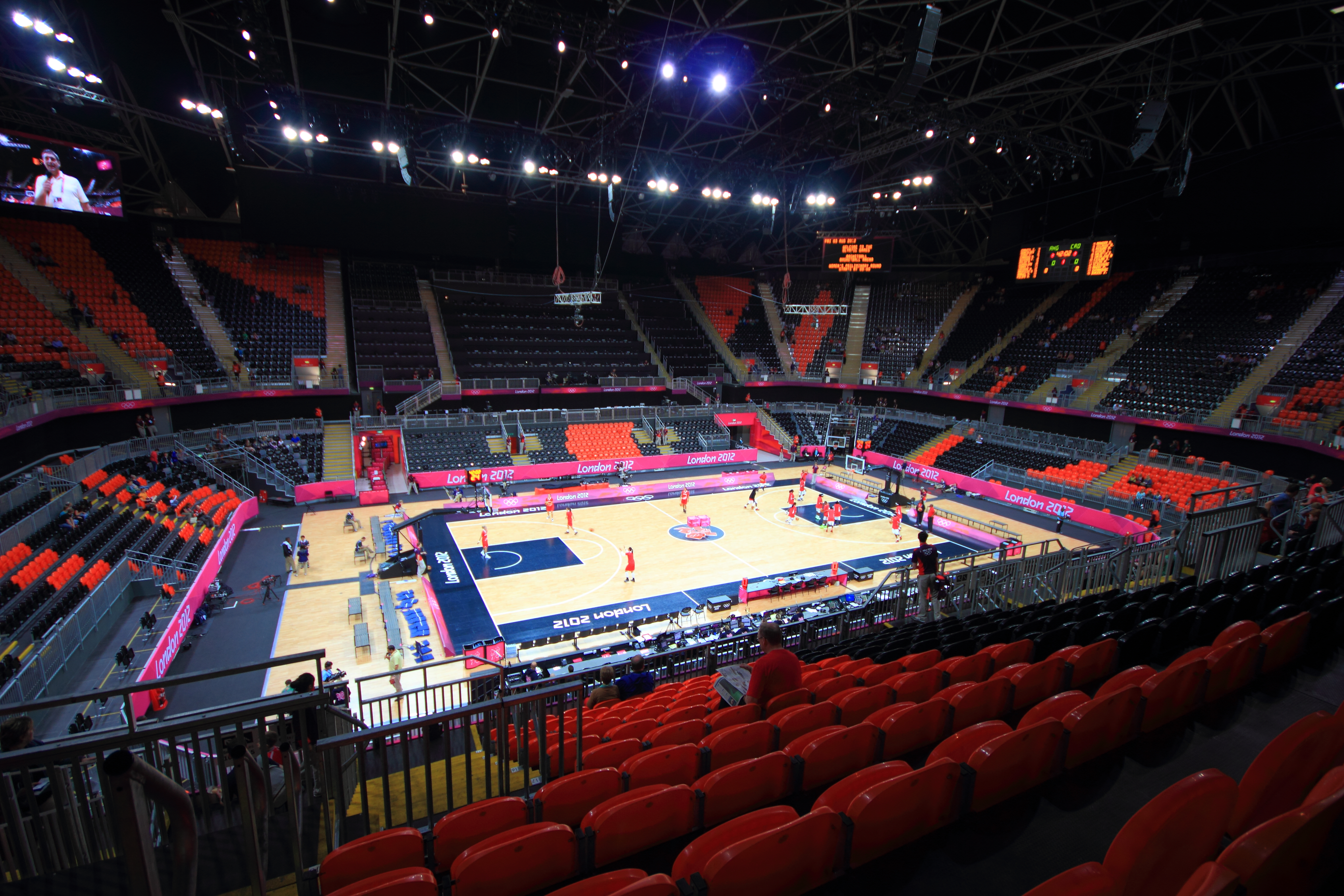
The Basketball Arena interior

The Basketball Arena had 12,000 seats for Olympic basketball and the semi-finals and finals of Olympic handball, and 10,000 for Paralympic wheelchair basketball and wheelchair rugby. The arena was also used as a holding area for athletes during the opening and closing ceremonies of the games. Concept designs by Wilkinson Eyre Architects & KSS Design Group were agreed in June 2008 and a planning application was submitted in November 2008. It was a temporary venue, and the largest built for any Olympic games. The possibility of subsequently deconstructing the arena and transporting it to Rio de Janeiro for the 2016 Summer Olympics was discussed, though the plan was shelved due to doubts from some Brazilian officials about its feasibility.

In early October 2008 it was speculated that Wembley Arena could be used as a replacement venue for the preliminary rounds of the 2012 Olympic basketball tournament instead of the Basketball Arena, thus saving up to £90 million, but in March 2009 it was confirmed that a new arena would be built in Stratford as originally proposed.

In late October 2009, preparatory work had begun on the site and Paisley-based Barr Construction would begin building the main arena in spring 2010. The basketball arena took 15 months to build and was completed in June 2011.

Sustainability was an important concern. The arena was made out of sturdy individual components that could be easily dismantled and sub-divided for reuse elsewhere, with over two-thirds of the materials and components to be recyclable.

The test event for the arena was the London International Basketball Invitational competition, which took place between 16 and 21 August 2011. For the test event, the venue had a capacity of 3,000.

== Construction ==
Instead of using a concrete sub-structure, a lightweight steel frame was used, with cladding. This meant the building (frame and cladding) was constructed in six weeks. The venue, a 30-metre-high rectangular volume (the equivalent of a seven-storey building) was made out of a steel portal frame and wrapped in 20,000 square metres of lightweight phthalate-free and recyclable PVC plastic. This translucent bespoke cladding was then stretched across the steel framing modules that pushed the fabric out and created the three-dimensional undulating pattern along the sides. An interwoven blackout layer was used in the roof fabric, this reduced most of the daylight during game sessions and maintained a fully controllable artificial lighting for use by the media and game spectators. The external fabric walls were translucent, allowing daylight to pass through during the day and artificial lighting to be visible during the evening.

The architects worked with United Visual Artists (specialists in concert lighting and installations) to create lighting and colour-changing effects for the evening games. The result was a dynamic illumination which, at night, transforms the white surface into a variety of saturated colours and strong silhouettes of the steel frame, creating the biggest light installation on the Olympic park.

The arena was constructed with materials that could be recycled efficiently. The arena was officially put up for sale on 20 January 2013 by GL events Slick Seating.

An agreement was made with Tony Kleanthous and Barnet that the seating used in the arena would be coloured orange and black, so that Barnet could purchase the seating after the venue was dismantled and use it in the construction of their new ground, The Hive.
